= 2021–22 Coppa Italia Serie C =

Tournament details
- Country: Italy
- Dates: 19 August 2021 – 6 April 2022
- Teams: 60

Final positions
- Champions: Padova
- Runners-up: Südtirol

Tournament statistics
- Matches played: 62
- Goals scored: 154 (2.48 per match)
- Top goal scorer(s): Nicolás Bubas; Mattia Minesso (4 goals each)

The 2021–22 Coppa Italia Serie C was the 49th season of the Coppa Italia Serie C, the cup competition for Serie C clubs.

Juventus U23 were the defending champions having won their first title in June 2020 against Ternana, with a 2–1 final score in the final.

The 2020–21 season was not held due to the COVID-19 pandemic.

== Participating teams ==
=== Group A (20 teams) ===
- AlbinoLeffe
- FeralpiSalò
- Fiorenzuola
- Giana Erminio
- Juventus U23
- Lecco
- Legnago
- Mantova
- Padova
- Pergolettese
- Piacenza
- Pro Patria
- Pro Sesto
- Pro Vercelli
- Renate
- Seregno
- Südtirol
- Trento
- Triestina
- Virtus Verona

=== Group B (20 teams) ===
- Ancona-Matelica
- Carrarese
- Cesena
- Fermana
- Grosseto
- Gubbio
- Imolese
- Lucchese
- Modena
- Montevarchi
- Olbia
- Pescara
- Pistoiese
- Pontedera
- Reggiana
- Siena
- Teramo
- Virtus Entella
- Vis Pesaro
- Viterbese

=== Group C (20 teams) ===
- ACR Messina
- Avellino
- Bari
- Campobasso
- Catania
- Catanzaro
- Fidelis Andria
- Foggia
- Juve Stabia
- Latina
- Monopoli
- Monterosi
- Paganese
- Palermo
- Picerno
- Potenza
- Taranto
- Turris
- Vibonese
- Virtus Francavilla

== Format and seeding ==
The 60 teams in the 2021–22 Serie C entered the competition at various stages, as follows:

- First phase (one-legged fixtures)
  - First round (one-legged): it is contested by the 56 teams who do not participate in the Coppa Italia.
  - Second round (one-legged): it is contested by the 28 winners of the first round and the four teams that participate in Coppa Italia.
- Second phase
  - Round of 16 (one-legged): it is contested by the 16 winners of the second round.
  - Quarter-finals (one-legged)
  - Semi-finals (two-legged)
- Final (two-legged)

== Round dates ==
The schedule of each rounds were announced on 27 July 2021.

Phase	Round	First leg	Second leg
First stage	First round	19 August & 21–22 August 2021	
First stage	Second round	8 September & 14–16 September 2021	
Final stage	Round of 16	3 November 2021	
Final stage	Quarter-finals	24 November 2021	
Final stage	Semi-finals	15 December 2021; 18 January 2022	19 January 2022; 2 March 2022
Final stage	Final	9 March 2022	6 April 2022

== First round ==
The draw was made on 9 August 2021.

=== Group 1 ===
21 August 2021	Pro Vercelli	0–0 (a.e.t.) (3–2 p)	Pergolettese	Vercelli
16:00 CEST		Report		Stadium: Silvio Piola; Attendance: 197; Referee: Andrea Calzavara
	Penalties
	Belardinelli (penalty scored); Bunino (penalty scored); Macchioni (penalty missed); Silenzi (penalty missed); Iotti (penalty scored)		(penalty scored) Varas; (penalty missed) Villa; (penalty scored) Arini; (penalty missed) Guiu; (penalty missed) Morello

21 August 2021	Virtus Verona	2–2 (a.e.t.) (4–5 p)	Giana Erminio	Verona
17:00 CEST	De Rigo 11'; Carlevaris 105'	Report	Ferrari 67'; Corti 105+3' (pen.)	Stadium: Mario Gavagnin-Sinibaldo Nocini; Referee: Aleksandar Djurdjevic
	Penalties
	Arma (penalty missed); Lonardi (penalty missed); Carlevaris (penalty missed); Vesentini (penalty scored); Metlika (penalty scored); Zugaro (penalty scored); Tronchin (penalty missed); Cella (penalty scored); Daffara (penalty missed)		(penalty missed) Pinto; (penalty scored) Magri; (penalty missed) Ferrari; (penalty missed) D'Ausilio; (penalty scored) Corti; (penalty scored) Perico; (penalty missed) Messaggi; (penalty scored) Cazzola; (penalty scored) Bonalumi

21 August 2021	FeralpiSalò	3–0 (awd.)	Pro Patria	Salò
18:00 CEST		Report	Stanzani 9'	Stadium: Lino Turina; Attendance: 200; Referee: Luigi Catanoso
Note: FeralpiSalò were awarded a 3–0 win due to Pro Patria fielding an ineligible player. Match originally ended with Pro Patria winning 1–0.

21 August 2021	Renate	1–3	Seregno	Meda
18:00 CEST	Possenti 7'	Report	Cernigoi 14', 38'; Scognamiglio 65'	Stadium: Città di Meda; Referee: Giuseppe Mucera

21 August 2021	Triestina	0–1	Trento	Trieste
18:30 CEST		Report	Belcastro 56' (pen.)	Stadium: Nereo Rocco; Attendance: 1,600; Referee: Roberto Lovison

22 August 2021	AlbinoLeffe	2–1	Lecco	Gorgonzola
17:30 CEST	Cori 42'; Tomaselli 45+2'	Report	Iocolano 21'	Stadium: Città di Gorgonzola; Attendance: 159; Referee: Francesco Burlando

22 August 2021	Pro Sesto	2–3 (a.e.t.)	Juventus U23	Sesto San Giovanni
18:00 CEST	Grandi 1'; Marchesi 16'	Report	Sersanti 33'; Cudrig 40'; Miretti 107' (pen.)	Stadium: Breda; Referee: Gioele Iacobellis

=== Group 2 ===
21 August 2021	Legnago	3–0 (awd.)	Lucchese	Legnago
17:30 CEST		Report	Gibilterra 62'; Nanni 70'; Semprini 82' (pen.)	Stadium: Mario Sandrini; Referee: Abdoulaye Diop
Note: Legnago were awarded a 3–0 win due to Lucchese fielding an ineligible player. Match originally ended with Lucchese winning 3–0.

21 August 2021	Vis Pesaro	0–1	Modena	Pesaro
18:00 CEST		Report	Pergreffi 83'	Stadium: Tonino Benelli; Referee: Francesco D'Eusanio

21 August 2021	Pontedera	1–3	Mantova	Pontedera
18:00 CEST	Barba 43'	Report	Rosso 22'; Guccione 48'; Zappa 61'	Stadium: Ettore Mannucci; Attendance: 200; Referee: Domenico Mirabella

21 August 2021	Virtus Entella	1–0	Fiorenzuola	Chiavari
21:00 CEST	Paolucci 78' (pen.)	Report		Stadium: Comunale di Chiavari; Attendance: 300; Referee: Simone Gauzolino

22 August 2021	Piacenza	1–0	Reggiana	Piacenza
17:30 CEST	Bobb 67'	Report		Stadium: Leonardo Garilli; Attendance: 1,000; Referee: Tommaso Zamagni

22 August 2021	Imolese	2–1	Carrarese	Imola
18:00 CEST	Stanco 6'; Rota 87' (o.g.)	Report	Figoli 70'	Stadium: Romeo Galli; Referee: Valerio Pezzopane

22 August 2021	Cesena	3–1	Pistoiese	Cesena
20:45 CEST	Zecca 6'; Bortolussi 36'; Caturano 67'	Report	Šabotić 75'	Stadium: Orogel Stadium-Dino Manuzzi; Attendance: 824; Referee: Enrico Gigliotti
Note: Tie reversed from the original draw.

=== Group 3 ===
19 August 2021	Pescara	2–0	Olbia	Pescara
20:45 CEST	Galano 71'; Cancellotti 77'	Report		Stadium: Adriatico; Attendance: 1,000; Referee: Domenico Leone

21 August 2021	Teramo	2–0	Monterosi	Teramo
17:30 CEST	Birligea 19', 39'	Report		Stadium: Gaetano Bonolis; Attendance: 289; Referee: Andrea Zanotti

21 August 2021	Ancona-Matelica	1–1 (a.e.t.) (3–2 p)	Montevarchi	Ancona
18:00 CEST	Rolfini 22'	Report	Barranca 38'	Stadium: Del Conero; Attendance: 807; Referee: Luca Zucchetti
	Penalties
	Iotti (penalty missed); Maurizii (penalty scored); Sereni (penalty scored); Faggioli (penalty scored)		(penalty scored) Lischi; (penalty missed) Amatucci; (penalty missed) Martinelli; (penalty scored) Mercati; (penalty missed) Bassano

21 August 2021	Siena	1–1 (a.e.t.) (3–2 p)	Fermana	Siena
18:00 CEST	Guberti 61'	Report	Marchi 33' (pen.)	Stadium: Artemio Franchi; Attendance: 638; Referee: Giorgio Di Cicco
	Penalties
	Terigi (penalty scored); Marcellusi (penalty scored); Farcas (penalty missed); Varela (penalty scored)		(penalty scored) Capece; (penalty missed) Rovaglia; (penalty scored) Pistolesi; (penalty missed) Sperotto

21 August 2021	Viterbese	2–1	Gubbio	Viterbo
21:00 CEST	Calcagni 35'; Capanni 87'	Report	Mangni 75'	Stadium: Enrico Rocchi; Attendance: 500; Referee: Enrico Gemelli

21 August 2021	Grosseto	2–1	Campobasso	Grosseto
21:00 CEST	Moscati 22', 45'	Report	Vitali 88'	Stadium: Carlo Zecchini; Attendance: 500; Referee: Mario Perri

22 August 2021	Turris	1–0	Latina	Torre del Greco
20:00 CEST	Leonetti 24'	Report		Stadium: Amerigo Liguori; Referee: Leonardo Mastrodomenico

=== Group 4 ===
21 August 2021	Vibonese	0–1 (a.e.t.)	Catania	Vibo Valentia
17:30 CEST		Report	Reginaldo 100' (pen.)	Stadium: Luigi Razza; Attendance: 500; Referee: Alberto Ruben Arena

21 August 2021	Palermo	4–1	Picerno	Palermo
17:30 CEST	Lancini 12'; Floriano 15' (pen.); Luperini 53'; Fella 84'	Report	De Ciancio 21'	Stadium: Renzo Barbera; Attendance: 2,119; Referee: Andrea Ancora

21 August 2021	Foggia	2–0	Paganese	Foggia
21:00 CEST	Merkaj 5'; Merola 78'	Report		Stadium: Pino Zaccheria; Attendance: 2,500; Referee: Daniele Virgilio

21 August 2021	Bari	0–1	Fidelis Andria	Bari
21:00 CEST		Report	Bubas 38' (pen.)	Stadium: San Nicola; Attendance: 2,407; Referee: Davide Di Marco

21 August 2021	Juve Stabia	2–3	ACR Messina	Castellammare di Stabia
21:00 CEST	Fantoni 24' (o.g.); Panico 38'	Report	Simonetti 5'; Adorante 45+1'; Damian 80'	Stadium: Romeo Menti; Attendance: 500; Referee: Valerio Crezzini

21 August 2021	Monopoli	1–1 (a.e.t.) (4–2 p)	Potenza	Monopoli
21:00 CEST	Starita 30' (pen.)	Report	Gigli 60'	Stadium: Vito Simone Veneziani; Referee: Simone Taricone
	Penalties
	Mercadante (penalty scored); Arena (penalty scored); Langella (penalty scored); Starita (penalty scored)		(penalty missed) Coccia; (penalty scored) Zenuni; (penalty scored) Salvemini; (penalty missed) Volpe

22 August 2021	Virtus Francavilla	2–0	Taranto	Francavilla Fontana
21:00 CEST	Maiorino 54', 66'	Report		Stadium: Giovanni Paolo II; Attendance: 1,000; Referee: Simone Galipò

== Second round ==
The round is contested by the winners of the previous round and the four teams that participated in the 2021–22 Coppa Italia.

=== Group A ===
15 September 2021	Südtirol	4–1	Giana Erminio	Bolzano
16:30 CEST	Candellone 14', 89'; Odogwu 60'; Tait 67'	Report	D'Ausilio 34'	Stadium: Druso; Referee: Marco Emmanuele

15 September 2021	Juventus U23	3–2	FeralpiSalò	Alessandria
16:30 CEST	Soulé 45+3', 59'; Compagnon 67'	Report	Spagnoli 45+1'; Luppi 88'	Stadium: Giuseppe Moccagatta; Attendance: 50; Referee: Daniele Virgilio

15 September 2021	Trento	0–0 (a.e.t.) (3–1 p)	Seregno	Salò
18:30 CEST		Report		Stadium: Lino Turina; Referee: Marco Acanfora
	Penalties
	Ruffo Luci (penalty missed); Caporali (penalty missed); Simonti (penalty scored); Izzillo (penalty scored); Belcastro (penalty scored)		(penalty missed) D'Andrea; (penalty missed) Cocco; (penalty scored) Marino; (penalty missed) Solcia

15 September 2021	Pro Vercelli	2–2 (a.e.t.) (2–4 p)	AlbinoLeffe	Vercelli
20:00 CEST	Bunino 10'; Della Morte 48'	Report	Poletti 43'; Piccoli 61'	Stadium: Silvio Piola; Referee: Luca Zucchetti
	Penalties
	Bruzzaniti (penalty scored); Iezzi (penalty missed); Sangiorgi (penalty scored); Silenzi (penalty missed)		(penalty scored) Genevier; (penalty scored) Piccoli; (penalty scored) Nichetti; (penalty scored) Riva

=== Group B ===
8 September 2021	Piacenza	2–1	Mantova	Fiorenzuola d'Arda
20:30 CEST	Tafa 84'; Parisi 88'	Report	Bertini 35'	Stadium: Comunale di Fiorenzuola d'Arda; Attendance: 350; Referee: Valerio Crezzini

14 September 2021	Padova	1–0	Legnago	Padua
20:00 CEST	Bifulco 41'	Report		Stadium: Euganeo; Referee: Mattia Caldera

15 September 2021	Modena	4–0	Imolese	Modena
15:00 CEST	Azzi 11'; Minesso 14'; Baroni 48'; Bonfanti 56'	Report		Stadium: Alberto Braglia; Attendance: 607; Referee: Stefano Nicolini

15 September 2021	Cesena	1–2	Virtus Entella	Cesena
20:30 CEST	Pierini 65'	Report	Morosini 46'; Magrassi 90+3'	Stadium: Orogel Stadium-Dino Manuzzi; Attendance: 564; Referee: Adalberto Fiero

=== Group C ===
15 September 2021	Avellino	0–1	Ancona-Matelica	Avellino
17:00 CEST		Report	Iannoni 34'	Stadium: Partenio; Attendance: 319; Referee: Marco Saia

15 September 2021	Viterbese	3–1	Turris	Viterbo
18:00 CEST	Simonelli 31'; Longo 33' (o.g.); Murilo 76'	Report	Finardi 46'	Stadium: Enrico Rocchi; Referee: Gioele Iacobellis

15 September 2021	Pescara	2–0	Grosseto	Pescara
20:30 CEST	Zappella 40'; D'Ursi 51'	Report		Stadium: Adriatico; Attendance: 635; Referee: Simone Taricone

16 September 2021	Teramo	1–0	Siena	Teramo
15:00 CEST	Birligea 48'	Report		Stadium: Gaetano Bonolis; Attendance: 209; Referee: Dario Madonia

=== Group D ===
15 September 2021	Palermo	2–1	Monopoli	Palermo
15:00 CEST	Fella 20' (pen.); Valente 25'	Report	Grandolfo 60'	Stadium: Renzo Barbera; Attendance: 1,008; Referee: Giuseppe Collu

15 September 2021	Catanzaro	1–0	Catania	Catanzaro
17:30 CEST	Monterisi 90+1'	Report		Stadium: Nicola Ceravolo; Attendance: Giorgio Vergaro; Referee: 620

15 September 2021	Fidelis Andria	2–1 (a.e.t.)	Virtus Francavilla	Andria
17:30 CEST	Bubas 89'; Di Noia 117'	Report	Enyan 67'	Stadium: Degli Ulivi; Referee: Francesco Carrione

15 September 2021	Foggia	2–0	ACR Messina	Foggia
17:30 CEST	Di Grazia 27'; Curcio 33' (pen.)	Report		Stadium: Pino Zaccheria; Attendance: 2,000; Referee: Claudio Petrella

== Round of 16 ==
3 November 2021	AlbinoLeffe	2–2 (a.e.t.) (8–7 p)	Trento	Gorgonzola
14:30 CET	Ravasio 85'; Tomaselli 115'	Report	Barbuti 48'; Scorza 120+1'	Stadium: Città di Gorgonzola; Attendance: 100; Referee: Mario Perri
	Penalties
	De Felice (penalty scored); Tomaselli (penalty missed); Nichetti (penalty scored); Muzio (penalty scored); Ravasio (penalty scored); Marchetti (penalty scored); Saltarelli (penalty missed); Gușu (penalty scored); Concas (penalty scored); Miculi (penalty scored)		(penalty scored) Nunes; (penalty missed) Carini; (penalty scored) Chinellato; (penalty scored) Ruffo Luci; (penalty scored) Vianni; (penalty scored) Pattarello; (penalty missed) Scorza; (penalty scored) Seno; (penalty scored) Trainotti; (penalty missed) Simonti

3 November 2021	Catanzaro	1–0	Palermo	Catanzaro
14:30 CET	Curiale 68'	Report		Stadium: Nicola Ceravolo; Attendance: 423; Referee: Matteo Centi

3 November 2021	Padova	2–1 (a.e.t.)	Virtus Entella	Padua
15:00 CET	Bifulco 64'; Chiricò 105'	Report	Capello 63'	Stadium: Euganeo; Attendance: 100; Referee: Niccolò Turrini

3 November 2021	Modena	4–4 (a.e.t.) (3–4 p)	Piacenza	Modena
15:00 CET	Silvestri 20'; Minesso 37' (pen.), 50', 99'	Report	Simonetti 7'; Dubickas 62'; Parisi 65'; Narciso 105+1' (o.g.)	Stadium: Alberto Braglia; Referee: Michele Delrio
	Penalties
	Minesso (penalty scored); Renzetti (penalty scored); Castiglia (penalty missed); Mosti (penalty missed); Di Paola (penalty scored)		Marino (penalty scored); Dubickas (penalty scored); Rabbi (penalty missed); Suljić (penalty scored); Armini (penalty scored)

3 November 2021	Ancona-Matelica	0–1	Viterbese	Ancona
15:00 CET		Report	Iuliano 55'	Stadium: Del Conero; Attendance: 307; Referee: William Villa

3 November 2021	Südtirol	2–1	Juventus U23	Bolzano
17:00 CET	Odogwu 34'; Candellone 41'	Report	Nicolussi Caviglia 62'	Stadium: Druso; Referee: Antonino Costanza

3 November 2021	Teramo	1–0	Pescara	Teramo
20:30 CET	Viero 51'	Report		Stadium: Gaetano Bonolis; Attendance: 1,140; Referee: Andrea Bordin

3 November 2021	Foggia	2–3	Fidelis Andria	Foggia
20:30 CET	Garofalo 45+3', 70'	Report	Bubas 33'; Di Piazza 58', 79' (pen.)	Stadium: Pino Zaccheria; Attendance: 1,000; Referee: Luca Angelucci

== Quarter-finals ==
24 November 2021	Fidelis Andria	1–0	Piacenza	Andria
14:30 CET	Bubas 25'	Report		Stadium: Degli Ulivi; Referee: Ermes Fabrizio Cavaliere

24 November 2021	AlbinoLeffe	0–1	Catanzaro	Gorgonzola
14:30 CET		Report	Cinelli 5'	Stadium: Città di Gorgonzola; Attendance: 500; Referee: Luca Cherchi

24 November 2021	Padova	1–0	Viterbese	Padua
15:00 CET	Biasci 11'	Report		Stadium: Euganeo; Attendance: 262; Referee: Filippo Giaccaglia

24 November 2021	Teramo	0–3	Südtirol	Teramo
17:30 CET		Report	Voltan 6'; Vinetot 42'; Rover 71'	Stadium: Gaetano Bonolis; Attendance: 435; Referee: Eugenio Scarpa

== Semi-finals ==
=== First leg ===
15 December 2021	Padova	1–1	Catanzaro	Padua
15:30 CET	Kirwan 9'	Report	Verna 15'	Stadium: Euganeo; Attendance: 364; Referee: Marco Ricci

18 January 2022	Fidelis Andria	0–4	Südtirol	Andria
15:00 CET		Report	Casiraghi 12' (pen.); Odogwu 36'; Fink 69'; Nunzella 76' (o.g.)	Stadium: Degli Ulivi; Referee: Adalberto Fiero

=== Second leg ===
19 January 2022	Catanzaro	0–1	Padova	Catanzaro
15:30 CET		Report	Bifulco 9'	Stadium: Nicola Ceravolo; Attendance: 1,492; Referee: Marco Acanfora

2 March 2022	Südtirol	3–1	Fidelis Andria	Bolzano
16:30 CET	Fischnaller 39', 57'; Eklu 42'	Report	Ortisi 33'	Stadium: Druso; Referee: Mattia Pascarella

== Final ==
=== First leg ===
9 March 2022	Padova	0–0	Südtirol	Padua
18:50 CET		Report		Stadium: Euganeo; Attendance: 626; Referee: Daniele Perenzoni

=== Second leg ===
6 April 2022	Südtirol	0–1	Padova	Bolzano
20:00 CEST		Report	Jelenič 64'	Stadium: Druso; Referee: Ermanno Feliciano

== Bracket (from second round) ==
Second Round
Padova	1
Legnago	0
Cesena	1
Virtus Entella	2
Avellino	0
Ancona-Matelica	1
Viterbese	3
Turris	1
Pro Vercelli	2 (2)
AlbinoLeffe (p)	2 (4)
Trento (p)	0 (3)
Seregno	0 (1)
Catanzaro	1
Catania	0
Palermo	2
Monopoli	1
Foggia	2
ACR Messina	0
Fidelis Andria (a.e.t.)	2
Virtus Francavilla	1
Modena	4
Imolese	0
Piacenza	2
Mantova	1
Teramo	1
Siena	0
Pescara	2
Grosseto	0
Südtirol	4
Giana Erminio	1
Juventus U23	3
FeralpiSalò	2

Round of 16
Padova (a.e.t.)	2
Virtus Entella	1
Ancona-Matelica	0
Viterbese	1
AlbinoLeffe (p)	2 (8)
Trento	2 (7)
Catanzaro	1
Palermo	0
Foggia	2
Fidelis Andria	3
Modena	4 (3)
Piacenza (p)	4 (4)
Teramo	1
Pescara	0
Südtirol	2
Juventus U23	1

Quarter-finals
Padova	1
Viterbese	0
AlbinoLeffe	0
Catanzaro	1
Fidelis Andria	1
Piacenza	0
Teramo	0
Südtirol	3

Semi-finals
Padova	1	1	2
Catanzaro	1	0	1
Fidelis Andria	0	1	1
Südtirol	4	3	7

Final
Padova	0	1	1
Südtirol	0	0	0

== Goalscorers ==
Statistics include the goals scored by Pro Patria and Lucchese against FeralpiSalò and Legnago, for a total of 154 goals.

Rank	Player	Club	Goals
1	(Argentina) Nicolás Bubas	Fidelis Andria	4
1	(Italy) Mattia Minesso	Modena	4
3	(Italy) Alfredo Bifulco	Padova	3
3	(Romania) Daniel Birligea	Teramo	3
3	(Italy) Leonardo Candellone	Südtirol	3
3	(Italy) Raphael Odogwu	Südtirol	3
7	(Italy) Iacopo Cernigoi	Seregno	2
7	(Italy) Matteo Di Piazza	Fidelis Andria	2
7	(Italy) Giuseppe Fella	Palermo	2
7	(Italy) Manuel Fischnaller	Südtirol	2
7	(Italy) Vincenzo Garofalo	Foggia	2
7	(Italy) Pasquale Maiorino	Virtus Francavilla	2
7	(Italy) Filippo Moscati	Grosseto	2
7	(Italy) Tino Parisi	Piacenza	2
7	(Argentina) Matías Soulé	Juventus U23	2
7	(Italy) Giacomo Tomaselli	AlbinoLeffe	2
17	109 players		1

=== Own goals ===
Player	Club	Opponents
(Italy) Nicholas Fantoni	ACR Messina	Juve Stabia
(Italy) Fabio Longo	Turris	Viterbese
(Italy) Antonio Narciso	Modena	Piacenza
(Italy) Leonardo Nunzella	Fidelis Andria	Südtirol
(Greece) Arensi Rota	Carrarese	Imolese
