= 2025–26 US Città di Pontedera season =

Italian football club 2025-36 season

US Città di Pontedera
2025–26 season
- Manager: Leonardo Menichini
- Stadium: Stadio Ettore Mannucci
- Serie C Group B: 16th
- Coppa Italia Serie C: First round

The 2025–26 season is the 114th in the history of Unione Sportiva Città di Pontedera and the club’s fifth consecutive season in Serie C of Italian football. In addition to the domestic league, Pontedera competes in the Coppa Italia Serie C. The season began on 17 August 2025.

== Squad ==
=== Transfers In ===
Pos.	Player	Transferred from	Fee	Date	Source
DF	(Italy) Edoardo Vona	(Italy) Latina	Undisclosed	1 July 2025	
DF	(Italy) Francesco Corradini	(Italy) Sassuolo U20	Loan	17 July 2025	
DF	(Italy) Ousmane Gueye	(Italy) Torino U20	Loan	18 July 2025	
DF	(Italy) Lapo Paolieri	(Italy) Empoli FC	Undisclosed	18 July 2025	
MF	(Italy) Matteo Polizzi	(Italy) Perugia	Loan	24 July 2025	
DF	(Italy) Luciano Ballan	(Italy) Legnago Salus	Undisclosed	28 July 2025	
MF	(Italy) Riccardo Bassanini	(Italy) Pisa	Loan	29 July 2025	
FW	(Portugal) Herculano Nabian	(Italy) Empoli FC	Loan	7 August 2025	
GK	(Italy) Valerio Biagini	(Italy) Empoli FC	Undisclosed	8 August 2025	
DF	(Italy) Lorenzo Beghetto	(Italy) ChievoVerona	Free	19 August 2025	
MF	(Italy) Matteo Manfredonia	(Italy) Clodiense	Free	20 August 2025	
FW	(Italy) Giuseppe Battimelli	(Italy) Bologna U20	Loan	30 August 2025	
MF	(Italy) Filippo Faggi	(Italy) Bari	Loan	1 September 2025	

=== Transfers Out ===
Pos.	Player	Transferred to	Fee	Date	Source
DF	(Italy) Andrea Moretti	(Italy) Triestina	Loan return	30 June 2025	
FW	(Italy) Mirco Lipari	(Italy) FC Lumezzane	Loan return	30 June 2025	
GK	(Italy) Elia Tantalocchi	(Italy) Sampdoria	Loan return	30 June 2025	
DF	(Italy) Riccardo Martinelli	(Italy) Piacenza	Free	20 July 2025	
MF	(Belgium) Kenneth Van Ransbeeck	(Italy) Heraclea	Free	25 July 2025	
MF	(Italy) Niccolò Pietra	(Italy) Carpi	Free	28 August 2025	

== Friendlies ==
10 August 2025	Sampdoria	1–0	Pontedera
17:00	Cuni 7'

== Competitions ==
=== Overall record ===
Competition	First match	Last match	Starting round	Final position	Record							
Competition	First match	Last match	Starting round	Final position	Pld	W	D	L	GF	GA	GD	Win %
Serie C	23 August 2025	26 April 2026	Matchday 1		5	1	1	3	3	10	−7	20.00
Coppa Italia Serie C	17 August 2025		First round	First round	1	0	1	0	0	0	+0	0.00
Total					6	1	2	3	3	10	−7	16.67

Last updated: 19 September 2025
Source: Competitions

=== Serie C ===
Group B

==== Results summary ====
Overall								Home						Away					
Pld	W	D	L	GF	GA	GD	Pts	W	D	L	GF	GA	GD	W	D	L	GF	GA	GD
5	1	1	3	3	9	−6	4	1	0	2	2	7	−5	0	1	1	1	2	−1

Last updated: 19 September 2025.

==== Results by round ====
Round	1	2	3	4	5	6
Ground	A	H	A	H	H	A
Result	L	L	D	W	L	
Position	16	19	19	16	16	

Updated to match(es) played on 19 September 2025. Source:
A = Away; H = Home; W = Win; D = Draw; L = Loss

==== Matches ====
The draw was conducted on 28 July 2025.

23 August 2025 1	Torres	1–0	Pontedera	Sassari
17:30	Zecca 30'			Stadium: Stadio Vanni Sanna; Attendance: 3,228; Referee: Michele Pasculli

29 August 2025 2	Pontedera	0–3	Arezzo	Pontedera
21:00 UTC+2			Tavernelli 8'; Chierico 30'; Chiosa (yellow card) 45+1' (yellow-red card) 61'; Varela Djamanca 88'	Stadium: Stadio Ettore Mannucci; Attendance: 1,154; Referee: Francesco Burlando

7 September 2025 3	Pineto	1–1	Pontedera	Pineto
17:30 UTC+2	Postiglione 85'		Corradini (yellow card) 8' (yellow-red card) 28'; Polizzi 62'	Stadium: Stadio Mimmo Pavone-Alessandro Mariani; Referee: Leonardo Leorsini

13 September 2025 4	Pontedera	2–1	Rimini	Pontedera
17:30 UTC+2	Ladinetti 71' (pen.); Vitali 89'		Bellodi 90+4'	Stadium: Stadio Ettore Mannucci; Attendance: 486; Referee: Davide Galiffi

19 September 2025 5	Pontedera	0–4	Campobasso	Pontedera
20:42 UTC+2			Leonetti 6'; Magnaghi 9'; Pierno 30'; Bifulco 68'	Stadium: Stadio Ettore Mannucci; Referee: David Kovacevic

23 September 2025 6	Ternana	v	Pontedera	Terni
18:30 UTC+2				Stadium: Stadio Libero Liberati

=== Coppa Italia Serie C ===
17 August 2025 First round	Perugia	0–0 (5–4 p)	Pontedera	Perugia
18:00 UTC+2				Stadium: Stadio Renato Curi; Referee: Gerardo Simone Caruso
