= Federico Moretti (footballer, born 1994) =

Italian footballer

Personal information
- Date of birth: 16 September 1994 (age 32)
- Place of birth: Teramo, Italy
- Height: 1.79 m (5 ft 10 in)
- Position: Forward

Team information
- Current team: Ars et Labor

Senior career*
Years	Team	Apps	(Gls)
2012–2013	Milazzo	2	(0)
2013–2014	Riccione	30	(0)
2014–2018	San Nicolò	125	(28)
2018–2019	SN Notaresco	35	(4)
2019–2021	Matelica	58	(15)
2021–2023	Ancona	63	(12)
2023–2024	Brindisi	14	(0)
2024	Ancona	10	(0)
2024–2025	Sambenedettese	25	(5)
2025	Union Clodiense Chioggia	6	(1)
2025–	Ars et Labor		
- * Club domestic league appearances and goals as of 12 October 2025

Federico Moretti (born 16 September 1994) is an Italian professional footballer who plays as a forward for Eccellenza club Ars et Labor.

== Club career ==
Born in Teramo, Moretti started his career with Serie C2 club Milazzo.

In 2019, he joined Matelica Calcio. On 27 June 2021, he renew his contract with the club, under the new name Ancona-Matelica.

On 26 August 2023, Moretti signed a two-year contract with Brindisi.

On 4 January 2024, he returned to Ancona.
