= 2021–22 Serie C =

Serie C
- Season: 2021–22
- Dates: Regular season: 28 August 2021 – 24 April 2022; Play-offs and play-outs: 1 May 2022 – 12 June 2022
- Promoted: Südtirol; Modena; Bari; Palermo (via play-off)
- Relegated: Seregno; Giana Erminio; Legnago; Teramo (excluded); Pistoiese; Grosseto; Campobasso (excluded); Paganese; Vibonese; Catania (excluded)
- Matches: 1,102
- Goals: 2,583 (2.34 per match)
- Top goalscorer: Matteo Brunori (25+4 goals)
- Biggest home win: Feralpisalò 6–0 Pergolettese (27 November 2021); Cesena 6–0 Carrarese (14 April 2022)
- Biggest away win: Pontedera 0–5 Ancona-Matelica (22 January 2022)
- Highest scoring: Paganese 4–4 ACR Messina (28 August 2021); Campobasso 4–4 Catania (6 November 2021); Picerno 5–3 Paganese (11 December 2021); Virtus Francavilla 4–4 Campobasso (3 April 2022); Foggia 2–6 Catanzaro (11 April 2022)
- Longest winning run: Modena (9–20, 23–24) (14 matches)
- Longest unbeaten run: Südtirol (1–28) (28 matches)
- Longest winless run: Giana Erminio (7–20, 23) (15 matches)
- Longest losing run: Siena (15–20) (6 matches)
- Highest attendance: 35,037; Palermo 1–0 Feralpisalò (29 May 2022)
- Lowest attendance: 80; Juventus U23 0–1 Giana Erminio (29 September 2021)
- Total attendance: 2,027,508
- Average attendance: 1,711

The 2021–22 Serie C was the 63rd season of the Serie C, the third tier of the Italian football league system, organized by the Lega Pro.

== Changes ==
The league is composed by 60 teams, divided into three different groups. On 31 May 2021, the league committee decreed the three groups would be split horizontally in geographical terms, from north to south. The group composition was decided and formalized by the committee on 9 August.

The following teams have changed division since the 2020–21 season:

=== To Serie C ===
Relegated from Serie B

- Reggiana
- Pescara
- Virtus Entella

Promoted from Serie D

- Seregno (Group B winners)
- Trento (Group C winners)
- Fiorenzuola (Group D winners)
- Montevarchi (Group E winners)
- Campobasso (Group F winners)
- Monterosi (Group G winners)
- Taranto (Group H winners)
- ACR Messina (Group I winners)
- Picerno (Group H play-off winners, admitted)
- Fidelis Andria (Group H 3rd place, repechage)
- Latina (Group G runners-up, repechage)
- Siena (Group E 5th place, repechage)

=== From Serie C ===
Promoted to Serie B

- Como (Group A winners)
- Perugia (Group B winners)
- Ternana (Group C winners)
- Alessandria (play-off winners)

Relegated to Serie D

- Novara (excluded) (Note: Club admitted to Serie D via Article 52 of N.O.I.F.)
- Livorno (subsequently disbanded) (Note: Club admitted to Eccellenza Tuscany via Article 52 of N.O.I.F.)
- Sambenedettese (excluded) (Note: Club admitted to Serie D via Article 52 of N.O.I.F.)
- Carpi (excluded)
- Fano
- Ravenna
- Arezzo
- Casertana (excluded) (Note: Club admitted to Serie D by the Regional Administrative Court of Lazio)
- Bisceglie
- Cavese
- Trapani (excluded and subsequently disbanded) (Note: Succeeded by Serie D club Dattilo, which was renamed to FC Trapani 1905 and acquired the original club logo)

=== Vacancies ===
On 6 July 2021, the Lega Pro football league announced Serie D Group A winners Gozzano had renounced on their promotion right, thus automatically creating a vacancy in the league.

On 9 July 2021, the Co.Vi.So.C. rejected league application of Carpi, Casertana, Novara, Paganese and Sambenedettese. All these clubs successively requested being admitted on appeal; in case that is denied, they would still have the opportunity for a further appeal at the Italian National Olympic Committee level. On 26 July 2021 the Italian National Olympic Committee admitted Paganese's reclaim.

== Events ==
On 9 April 2022, Catania was excluded from the league with immediate effect due to financial issues, with only four games left for them to play till the end of the regular season; all of the club's results were subsequently expunged.

== Group A (North) ==
=== Stadia and locations ===
10 teams from Lombardy, 3 teams from Veneto, 2 teams from Emilia-Romagna, 2 teams from Piedmont, 2 teams from Trentino-Alto Adige/Südtirol and 1 team from Friuli -Venezia Giulia.

Location of teams in 2021–22 Serie C (Group A)
Location of teams in 2021–22 Serie C (Group A) (Lombardy)

Club	City	Stadium	Capacity
AlbinoLeffe	Albino and Leffe	AlbinoLeffe Stadium (Zanica); Città di Gorgonzola (Note: Until matchday 19.) (Gorgonzola)	1,791; 3,766
Feralpisalò	Salò and Lonato del Garda	Lino Turina	2,364
Fiorenzuola	Fiorenzuola d'Arda	Comunale di Fiorenzuola d'Arda	4,000
Giana Erminio	Gorgonzola	Città di Gorgonzola	3,766
Juventus U23	Turin	Giuseppe Moccagatta (Alessandria)	5,926
Lecco	Lecco	Rigamonti-Ceppi	4,997
Legnago	Legnago	Mario Sandrini	2,152
Mantova	Mantua	Danilo Martelli	14,884
Padova	Padua	Euganeo	32,420
Pergolettese	Crema	Giuseppe Voltini	4,095
Piacenza	Piacenza	Leonardo Garilli	21,668
Pro Patria	Busto Arsizio	Carlo Speroni	5,000
Pro Sesto	Sesto San Giovanni	Breda	4,501
Pro Vercelli	Vercelli	Silvio Piola	5,505
Renate	Renate	Città di Meda (Meda)	2,500
Seregno	Seregno	Ferruccio; Carlo Speroni (Note: Until matchday 3.) (Busto Arsizio)	3,700; 5,000
Südtirol	Bolzano	Druso	2,800
Trento	Trento	Briamasco; Lino Turina (Salò)	4,200; 2,364
Triestina	Trieste	Nereo Rocco	26,500
Virtus Verona	Verona	Mario Gavagnin-Sinibaldo Nocini	1,500

=== Table ===
Pos	Team	Pld	W	D	L	GF	GA	GD	Pts	Qualification
1	Südtirol (C, P)	38	27	9	2	49	9	+40	90	Promotion to Serie B. Qualification for the Supercoppa di Serie C
2	Padova	38	25	10	3	60	26	+34	85	Qualification for the promotion play-offs
3	Feralpisalò	38	20	9	9	56	29	+27	69	Qualification for the promotion play-offs
4	Renate	38	18	8	12	59	43	+16	62	Qualification for the promotion play-offs
5	Triestina	38	15	10	13	41	41	0	55 (Note: Triestina (5th placed) 9 points; Lecco 4 (-1); Pro Vercelli 4 (-2). (LEC-PVE 0-0; LEC-TRI 2-0; PVE-LEC 1-0; TRI-LEC 2-0; TRI-PVE 4-2; PVE-TRI 1-2). Lecco qualifies as sixth-placed due to higher head-to-head goal difference over Pro Vercelli.)	Qualification for the promotion play-offs
6	Lecco	38	16	7	15	51	42	+9	55	Qualification for the promotion play-offs
7	Pro Vercelli	38	14	13	11	41	40	+1	55	Qualification for the promotion play-offs
8	Juventus U23	38	15	9	14	43	43	0	54	Qualification for the promotion play-offs
9	Piacenza	38	12	14	12	44	46	−2	50	Qualification for the promotion play-offs
10	Pergolettese (Note: 1 point deducted due to financial irregularities.)	38	12	11	15	42	55	−13	46	Qualification for the promotion play-offs
11	Pro Patria	38	10	15	13	38	45	−7	45 (Note: Pro Patria qualifies to playoffs due to head-to-head matches: Pro Patria 7; Albinoleffe 6; Virtus Verona 2. (ALB-VVE 0-0; VVE-PPA 0-2; VVE-ALB 0-0; PPA-VVE 1-0; ALB-PPA 1-1; PPA-ALB 1-2))	Qualification for the promotion play-offs
12	AlbinoLeffe	38	10	15	13	42	43	−1	45	
13	Virtus Verona	38	9	18	11	35	38	−3	45	
14	Fiorenzuola	38	11	10	17	33	48	−15	43	
15	Mantova	38	9	15	14	37	42	−5	42 (Note: Mantova escapes relegation playoffs due to head-to-head advantage over Trento. (Trento-Mantova 2-2; Mantova-Trento 1-0))	
16	Trento (O)	38	9	15	14	31	36	−5	42	Qualification for the relegation play-outs
17	Pro Sesto (O)	38	8	14	16	33	46	−13	38	Qualification for the relegation play-outs
18	Seregno (R)	38	7	13	18	41	55	−14	34 (Note: Seregno placed above Giana Erminio due to head-to-head advantage (Seregno-Giana Erminio 2-0; Giana Erminio-Seregno 0-0).)	Qualification for the relegation play-outs
19	Giana Erminio (R)	38	6	16	16	25	41	−16	34	Qualification for the relegation play-outs
20	Legnago (R)	38	7	9	22	32	65	−33	30	Relegation to Serie D

Source: Lega Pro, Soccerway (in English)
Rules for classification: 1) Points; 2) Head-to-head points; 3) Head-to-head goal difference; 4) Goal difference; 5) Goals scored; 6) Lower goals against; 7) Wins; 8) Lower losses; 9) Away wins; 10) Lower home losses.
(C) Champions; (O) Play-off winners; (P) Promoted; (R) Relegated

== Group B (Centre) ==
=== Stadia and locations ===
7 teams from Tuscany, 4 teams from Emilia-Romagna, 3 teams from Marche, 2 teams from Abruzzo, 1 team from Lazio, 1 team from Liguria, 1 team from Sardinia and 1 team from Umbria.

Location of teams in 2021–22 Serie C (Group B)
Location of teams in 2021–22 Serie C (Group B) (Tuscany)

Club	City	Stadium	Capacity
Ancona-Matelica	Ancona	Del Conero	23,976
Carrarese	Carrara	Dei Marmi	9,500
Cesena	Cesena	Orogel Stadium-Dino Manuzzi	20,194
Fermana	Fermo	Bruno Recchioni	8,850
Grosseto	Grosseto	Carlo Zecchini	9,988
Gubbio	Gubbio	Pietro Barbetti	4,939
Imolese	Imola	Romeo Galli	4,000
Lucchese	Lucca	Porta Elisa	12,800
Modena	Modena	Alberto Braglia	21,151
Montevarchi	Montevarchi	Gastone Brilli Peri; Ettore Mannucci (Note: Until matchday 23.) (Pontedera)	4,500; 2,700
Olbia	Olbia	Bruno Nespoli	4,000
Pescara	Pescara	Adriatico – Giovanni Cornacchia	20,515
Pistoiese	Pistoia	Marcello Melani	13,195
Pontedera	Pontedera	Ettore Mannucci	2,700
Reggiana	Reggio Emilia	Mapei Stadium – Città del Tricolore	21,515
Siena	Siena	Artemio Franchi	15,373
Teramo	Teramo	Gaetano Bonolis	7,498
Virtus Entella	Chiavari	Comunale di Chiavari	5,587
Vis Pesaro	Pesaro	Tonino Benelli	4,898
Viterbese	Viterbo	Enrico Rocchi	5,460

=== Table ===
Pos	Team	Pld	W	D	L	GF	GA	GD	Pts	Qualification
1	Modena (C, P)	38	27	7	4	69	25	+44	88	Promotion to Serie B. Qualification for the Supercoppa di Serie C
2	Reggiana	38	25	11	2	72	26	+46	86	Qualification for the promotion play-offs
3	Cesena	38	18	13	7	53	31	+22	67	Qualification for the promotion play-offs
4	Virtus Entella	38	19	8	11	62	40	+22	65 (Note: Virtus Entella qualifies as fourth-placed due to goal difference, as head-to-head matches against Pescara ended in two draws (ENT-PES 2-2; PES-ENT 0-0).)	Qualification for the promotion play-offs
5	Pescara	38	17	14	7	56	41	+15	65	Qualification for the promotion play-offs
6	Ancona-Matelica	38	16	9	13	61	50	+11	57	Qualification for the promotion play-offs
7	Gubbio	38	12	16	10	53	44	+9	52	Qualification for the promotion play-offs
8	Lucchese	38	12	14	12	39	39	0	50	Qualification for the promotion play-offs
9	Olbia	38	11	13	14	44	47	−3	46	Qualification for the promotion play-offs
10	Carrarese	38	10	15	13	39	55	−16	45 (Note: Carrarese qualifies to playoffs as having achieved more points in head-to-head matches against Vis Pesaro and Montevarchi. Carrarese 6 points; Vis Pesaro 5; Montevarchi 3. (CAR-MON 2-2; VPE-CAR 0-0; MON-CAR 1-1; CAR-VPE 4-1; MON-VPE 1-1; VPE-MON 2-0))	Qualification for the promotion play-offs
11	Vis Pesaro	38	11	12	15	35	56	−21	45	
12	Montevarchi	38	12	9	17	41	55	−14	45	
13	Siena	38	10	14	14	40	41	−1	44	
14	Pontedera	38	11	10	17	38	56	−18	43	
15	Teramo (D)	38	10	12	16	36	57	−21	42	Excluded
16	Viterbese (O)	38	8	15	15	44	51	−7	39	Qualification for the relegation play-outs
17	Imolese (Note: Imolese were originally deducted 2 points due to irregularities in the club takeover. The deduction was successively revoked on appeal.) (O)	38	8	13	17	42	56	−14	37	Qualification for the relegation play-outs
18	Pistoiese (R)	38	8	12	18	40	59	−19	36	Qualification for the relegation play-outs
19	Fermana	38	7	14	17	31	49	−18	35	Readmitted
20	Grosseto (R)	38	5	15	18	30	47	−17	30	Relegation to Serie D

Source: Lega Pro, Soccerway (in English)
Rules for classification: 1) Points; 2) Head-to-head points; 3) Head-to-head goal difference; 4) Goal difference; 5) Goals scored; 6) Lower goals against; 7) Wins; 8) Lower losses; 9) Away wins; 10) Lower home losses.
(C) Champions; (D) Disqualified; (O) Play-off winners; (P) Promoted; (R) Relegated

== Group C (South) ==
=== Stadia and locations ===
6 teams from Apulia, 4 teams from Campania, 3 teams from Sicily, 2 teams from Basilicata, 2 teams from Calabria, 2 teams from Lazio and 1 team from Molise.

Location of teams in 2021–22 Serie C (Group C)
Location of teams in 2021–22 Serie C (Group C) (South)

Club	City	Stadium	Capacity
ACR Messina	Messina	San Filippo-Franco Scoglio; Luigi Razza (Vibo Valentia)	38,722; 6,000
Avellino	Avellino	Partenio-Adriano Lombardi	26,308
Bari	Bari	San Nicola	58,270
Campobasso	Campobasso	Nuovo Romagnoli	25,000
Catania	Catania	Angelo Massimino	20,016
Catanzaro	Catanzaro	Nicola Ceravolo	14,650
Fidelis Andria	Andria	Degli Ulivi	9,140
Foggia	Foggia	Pino Zaccheria	25,085
Juve Stabia	Castellammare di Stabia	Romeo Menti	7,642
Latina	Latina	Domenico Francioni	9,398
Monopoli	Monopoli	Vito Simone Veneziani	6,880
Monterosi	Monterosi	Enrico Rocchi (Viterbo)	5,460
Paganese	Pagani	Marcello Torre	5,093
Palermo	Palermo	Renzo Barbera	36,365
Picerno	Picerno	Donato Curcio; Alfredo Viviani (Note: Until matchday 6.) (Potenza)	1,500; 4,977
Potenza	Potenza	Alfredo Viviani	4,977
Taranto	Taranto	Erasmo Iacovone	26,884
Turris	Torre del Greco	Amerigo Liguori	3,566
Vibonese	Vibo Valentia	Luigi Razza	6,000
Virtus Francavilla	Francavilla Fontana	Giovanni Paolo II	2,137

=== Table ===
Pos	Team	Pld	W	D	L	GF	GA	GD	Pts	Qualification
1	Bari (C, P)	36	22	9	5	52	26	+26	75	Promotion to Serie B. Qualification for the Supercoppa di Serie C
2	Catanzaro	36	19	10	7	57	26	+31	67	Qualification for the promotion play-offs
3	Palermo (O, P)	36	18	12	6	64	33	+31	66	Qualification for the promotion play-offs
4	Avellino	36	17	13	6	45	26	+19	64	Qualification for the promotion play-offs
5	Monopoli	36	17	8	11	38	31	+7	59	Qualification for the promotion play-offs
6	Virtus Francavilla	36	16	8	12	48	38	+10	56	Qualification for the promotion play-offs
7	Foggia (Note: Foggia were deducted 2 points due to administrative irregularities in the club's ownership change procedure. The point deduction was reversed on appeal on 22 April 2022.)	36	13	15	8	62	51	+11	54	Qualification for the promotion play-offs
8	Turris	36	16	4	16	52	49	+3	52	Qualification for the promotion play-offs
9	Monterosi	36	13	12	11	40	38	+2	51	Qualification for the promotion play-offs
10	Picerno	36	14	8	14	41	45	−4	50	Qualification for the promotion play-offs
11	Juve Stabia (Note: 2 points deducted due to irregularities in the payment of the salaries.)	36	13	12	11	44	36	+8	49	
12	Latina	36	12	9	15	37	42	−5	45	
13	Campobasso (D)	36	11	11	14	51	62	−11	44	Excluded
14	ACR Messina	36	10	9	17	40	57	−17	39 (Note: ACR Messina is 14th placed due to head-to-head advantage over Taranto: Taranto-ACR Messina 0-0; ACR Messina-Taranto 3-1.)	
15	Taranto	36	8	15	13	31	40	−9	39	
16	Potenza	36	8	13	15	37	51	−14	37	
17	Fidelis Andria (O)	36	6	12	18	26	45	−19	30	Qualification for the relegation play-outs
18	Paganese (R)	36	6	8	22	36	69	−33	26	Qualification for the relegation play-outs
19	Vibonese (Note: Automatically relegated for having more than eight points of distance from 16th-placed team Potenza.) (R)	36	3	12	21	24	60	−36	21	Relegation to Serie D
20	Catania (Note: Excluded due to financial issues. Before that, they were deducted 4 points due to unpaid salaries.) (D)	0	0	0	0	0	0	0	0	Excluded

Source: Lega Pro, Soccerway (in English)
Rules for classification: 1) Points; 2) Head-to-head points; 3) Head-to-head goal difference; 4) Goal difference; 5) Goals scored; 6) Lower goals against; 7) Wins; 8) Lower losses; 9) Away wins; 10) Lower home losses.
(C) Champions; (D) Disqualified; (O) Play-off winners; (P) Promoted; (R) Relegated

== Promotion play-offs ==
As Padova and Südtirol, respectively winners and runners-up of the 2021–22 Coppa Italia Serie C, concluded the season in the first two spots from Group A, an additional spot in the national phase of the playoffs will be handed to the fourth-placed team from Group A itself.

Due to the exclusion of Catania, points for teams from Group C will be multiplied by a fixed coefficient of 1.05555556 in order to determine the best-placed team among different groups in the playoff rounds.

=== First round ===
Matches were played on 1 May 2022.

Team 1	Score	Team 2
Lecco	0–2	Pro Patria
Pro Vercelli	0–0	Pergolettese
Juventus U23	0–0	Piacenza
Pescara	2–2	Carrarese
Ancona-Matelica	0–2	Olbia
Gubbio	1–0	Lucchese
Monopoli	1–1	Picerno
Virtus Francavilla	2–2	Monterosi
Foggia	2–0	Turris

=== Second round ===
Matches were played on 4 May 2022.

Team 1	Score	Team 2
Triestina	2–1	Pro Patria
Pro Vercelli	0–1	Juventus U23
Virtus Entella	1–1	Olbia
Pescara	2–2	Gubbio
Avellino	1–2	Foggia
Monopoli	1–0	Virtus Francavilla

=== Third round ===
The first legs were played on 8 May 2022 and the second legs were played on 12 May 2022.

Team 1	Agg.	Team 2	1st leg	2nd leg
Pescara	4–5	Feralpisalò	3–3	1–2
Monopoli	4–2	Cesena	1–2	3–0
Triestina	2–3	Palermo	1–2	1–1
Juventus U23	2–1	Renate	1–1	1–0
Foggia	2–2	Virtus Entella	1–0	1–2

=== Quarter-finals ===
The first legs were played on 17 May 2022 and the second legs were played on 20 and 21 May 2022.

Team 1	Agg.	Team 2	1st leg	2nd leg
Juventus U23	1–1	Padova	0–1	1–0
Feralpisalò	3–1	Reggiana	1–0	2–1
Monopoli	1–3	Catanzaro	1–2	0–1
Virtus Entella	3–4	Palermo	1–2	2–2

=== Final Four ===
The semi-finals legs were played on 25 and 29 May 2022 and the final legs were played on 5 and 12 June 2022.

Semi-finals
2	Catanzaro	0	1	1
2	Padova	0	2	2
3	Feralpisalò	0	0	0
3	Palermo	3	1	4

Final
2	Padova	0	0	0
3	Palermo	1	1	2

Palermo promoted to Serie B.

== Relegation play-outs ==
The first legs were played on 7 May 2022 and the second legs were played on 14 and 15 May 2022.

Team 1	Agg.	Team 2	1st leg	2nd leg
Giana Erminio	2–4	Trento	2–3	0–1
Seregno	2–2	Pro Sesto	1–1	1–1
Fermana	1–2	Viterbese	1–0	0–2
Pistoiese	2–2	Imolese	2–1	0–1
Paganese	1–1	Fidelis Andria	1–0	0–1

== Top goalscorers ==
Rank	Player	Club	Goals
1	(Italy) Matteo Brunori^{1}	Palermo	29
2	(Italy) Luca Moro	Catania	21
3	(Italy) Alex Rolfini	Ancona-Matelica	18
3	(Italy) Luca Zamparo	Reggiana	18
5	(Italy) Mirco Antenucci	Bari	17
5	(Argentina) Franco Ferrari	Pescara	17
5	(Italy) Vito Leonetti	Turris	17
8	(Italy) Simone Magnaghi	Pontedera	16
8	(Italy) Tommy Maistrello	Renate	16
10	(Italy) Alessio Curcio^{2}	Foggia	15
10	(Italy) Alexis Ferrante	Foggia	15
10	(Italy) Eric Lanini	Reggiana	15
10	(Italy) Jacopo Manconi	AlbinoLeffe	15

Note

^{1} Player scored 4 goals in the play-offs.
^{2} Player scored 2 goals in the play-offs.
