= Marcello Sereni =

Italian footballer

Personal information
- Date of birth: 24 July 1996 (age 30)
- Place of birth: Modena, Italy
- Height: 1.75 m (5 ft 9 in)
- Position: Winger

Team information
- Current team: Teramo

Youth career
- Sassuolo

Senior career*
Years	Team	Apps	(Gls)
2015–2016	Sassuolo	0	(0)
2015–2016	→ Parma (loan)	23	(1)
2016	Castelvetro Calcio	9	(0)
2016–2018	Correggese	45	(7)
2018–2020	Mezzolara	66	(21)
2020–2021	Ravenna	32	(5)
2021–2022	Ancona-Matelica	36	(11)
2022–2023	Rimini	13	(1)
2023	→ Fiorenzuola (loan)	15	(1)
2023–2024	Pro Sesto	25	(1)
2024–2025	Carpi	11	(0)
2025	→ L'Aquila (loan)	12	(7)
2025–	Teramo	0	(0)
- * Club domestic league appearances and goals as of 4 May 2025

Marcello Sereni (born 24 July 1996) is an Italian professional footballer who plays as a winger for Serie D club Teramo.

== Club career ==
Sereni was formed on Sassuolo youth system. For the 2015–16 season, he was loaned to Parma, and made his senior debut in Serie D.

In 2016, he left Sassuolo and signed for Castelvetro Calcio on Serie D.

After five seasons in Serie D, on 8 September 2020, he signed with Serie C club Ravenna. Sereni made his professional debut on 27 September 2020 against Südtirol.

He played one season for Ravenna. On 1 August 2021, he joined Ancona-Matelica.

On 12 July 2022, he moved to Rimini. On 18 January 2023, Sereni was loaned to Fiorenzuola for the rest of the season.
