= Viero =

Viero is a surname. Notable people with the surname include:

- Federico Viero (born 1999), Italian professional footballer
- Teodoro Viero (1740–1819), Italian printmaker
