= Alfredo Bifulco =

Italian footballer (born 1997)

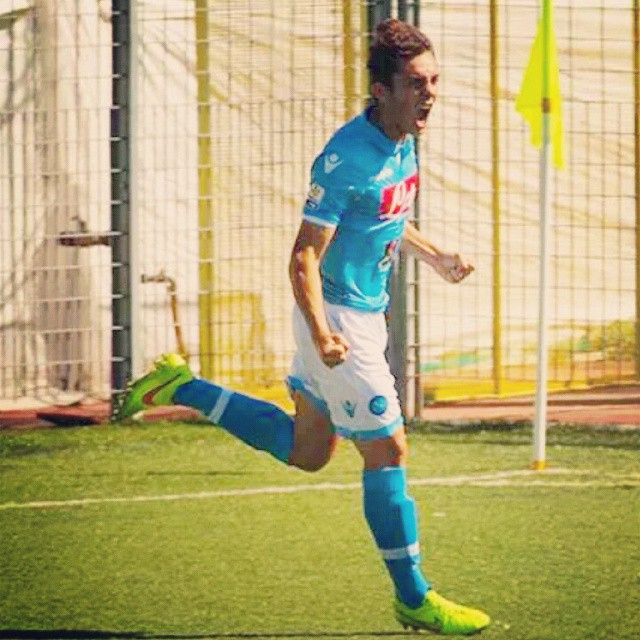

Personal information
- Full name: Alfredo Bifulco
- Date of birth: 19 January 1997 (age 29)
- Place of birth: Ottaviano, Italy
- Height: 1.73 m (5 ft 8 in)
- Position: Midfielder

Team information
- Current team: Campobasso
- Number: 14

Senior career*
Years	Team	Apps	(Gls)
2015–2020	Napoli	0	(0)
2015–2016	→ Rimini (loan)	18	(1)
2016–2017	→ Carpi (loan)	20	(3)
2017–2018	→ Pro Vercelli (loan)	29	(4)
2018–2019	→ Ternana (loan)	33	(5)
2019–2020	→ Juve Stabia (loan)	26	(2)
2020–2023	Padova	41	(9)
2023–2024	Taranto	48	(9)
2024–2025	Trapani	19	(3)
2025–	Campobasso	50	(16)

International career^{‡}
2013–2014	Italy U17	2	(0)
2014–2015	Italy U18	6	(4)
2015–2016	Italy U19	11	(1)
2016–2018	Italy U20	6	(0)
Medal record
Men's football
Representing Italy
FIFA U-20 World Cup
Third place	2017 South Korea
- * Club domestic league appearances and goals as of 30 April 2026 ‡ National team caps and goals as of 27 March 2018

Alfredo Bifulco (born 19 January 1997) is an Italian footballer who plays as a midfielder for Serie C Group B club Campobasso.

== Club career ==
=== Napoli ===
Born in Ottaviano, Bifulco was a youth exponent of Napoli.

==== Loan to Rimini ====
On 6 August 2015, Bifulco was signed by Serie C side Rimini on a season-long loan deal. Five weeks later, on 13 September, he made his professional debut in Serie C for Rimini as a starter, he was replaced by Pasquale Mazzocchi in 60th minute of a 1–0 home defeat against SPAL. On 2 April 2016, Bifulco scored his first professional goal for the club, as a substitute, in the 75th minute of a 1–1 away draw against Teramo. Bifulco also helped the club to avoid relegation in Serie D winning the play-out 4–2 on aggregate against L'Aquila, playing both matches as a substitute. He ended his season-long loan to Rimini with 20 appearances, including six of them as a starter, and scoring one goal, however he never played an entire match for the club during the season.

==== Loan to Carpi ====
On 28 July 2016, Bifulco was signed by Serie B side Carpi on a season-long loan deal. On 13 August he made his debut for Carpi as a substitute replacing Matteo Fedele in the 46th minute of a 2–1 away defeat in the third round of Coppa Italia. On 27 August, Bifulco made his debut in Serie B and he scored his first goal for Carpi in the 58th minute of a 2–0 away win over Vicenza, he was replaced by Kevin Lasagna in the 67th minute. On 22 October he scored his second goal in the 77th minute of a 3–1 away defeat against SPAL. On 17 December, Bifulco scored his third goal, as a substitute, in the 89th minute of a 2–1 away win over Salernitana. On 30 December he played his first entire match for Carpi, a 2–1 away defeat against Novara. Bifulco ended his loan to Carpi with 21 appearances and 3 goals.

==== Loan to Pro Vercelli ====
On 12 August 2017, Bifulco was signed by Serie B side Pro Vercelli on a season-long loan deal. On 26 August he made his debut for Pro Vercelli as a substitute replacing Filippo Berra in the 69th minute of a 2–0 home defeat against Frosinone. On 25 September he scored his first goal for Pro Vercelli in the 20th minute of a 2–1 away defeat against Palermo. On 21 October he played his first entire match for the club, a 0–0 home draw against Carpi. On 25 November, Bifulco scored his second goal in the 65th minute of a 1–1 home draw against Virtus Entella. On 27 January 2018 he scored his third goal, as a substitute, in the 93rd minute of a 2–0 home win over Ascoli. Bifulco ended his loan to Pro Vercelli with 29 appearances, 4 goals and 2 assists, but the team was relegated in Serie C.

==== Loan to Ternana ====
On 18 August 2018, Bifulco was loaned to Serie C club Ternana on a season-long loan deal. On 30 September he made his Serie C debut for Ternana as a substitute replacing Marino Defendi in the 85th minute of a 0–0 away draw against Vis Pesaro. On 14 October he played his first match as a starter for Ternana, a 2–0 away win over Virtus Verona, he was replaced Francesco Nicastro after 53 minutes. On 4 December he played his first entire match for the team, a 3–0 home win over Rimini. Eight days later, on 12 December, Bifulco scored his first goal for Ternana, as a substitute, in the 77th minute of a 2–1 away defeat against Südtirol. Four more days later, on 16 December he scored twice in a 3–3 home draw against Giana Erminio. Bifulco ended his season-long loan to Ternana with 32 appearances, 5 goals and 2 assists.

==== Loan to Juve Stabia ====
On 2 September 2019, Bifulco joined to newly promoted club Juve Stabia on loan for the 2019–20 season. Three weeks later, on 28 September he made his debut for the club as a starter in a 1–0 home defeat against Cittadella, he was replaced by Luigi Canotto in the 69th minute. On 13 December he played his first entire match for Juve Stabia, a 3–2 away win over ChievoVerona. One week later, on 21 December he scored his first goal for the club in the first minute of a 2–0 home win over Venezia, On 8 March 2020, Bifulco scored his second goal for Juve Stabia, as a substitute, in the 73rd minute of a 3–1 home win over Spezia. Bifulco ended his season-long loan to Juve Stabia with 26 appearances, 2 goals and 2 assist, however the club was relegated in Serie C.

=== Padova ===
On 29 September 2020, he moved to Serie C club Padova on a permanent basis and signed a three-year contract. On 4 October, Bifulco made his league debut for Padova as a substitute replacing Ronaldo for the last 5 minutes of a 1–1 away draw against Fano. Three days later, on 7 October, he played his first match as a starter and he also scored his first goal for Padova in the 36th minute of a 3–1 home win over Mantova, he was replaced by Enej Jelenič in the 61st minute. Four more days later, on 11 October, he scored his second goal for the club in the second minute of a 1–0 away win over Fermana. He became Padova's first-choice early in the season. On 15 November he scored his third goal for Padova in the 20th minute of a 3–0 home win over Matelica.

=== Taranto ===
On 12 January 2023, Bifulco was signed by Serie C club Taranto on a permanent deal.

=== Trapani ===
On 22 July 2024, Bifulco joined Trapani.

== Honours ==
Italy U20

- FIFA U-20 World Cup third place: 2017

== Career statistics ==
=== Club ===
As of 12 January 2023

Club	Season	League			Cup		Europe		Other		Total	
Club	Season	League	Apps	Goals	Apps	Goals	Apps	Goals	Apps	Goals	Apps	Goals
Rimini (loan)	2015–16	Serie C	18	1	0	0	—		2 (Note: All appearance(s) in Serie C play-out.)	0	20	1
Carpi (loan)	2016–17	Serie B	20	3	1	0	—		—		21	3
Pro Vercelli (loan)	2017–18	Serie B	29	4	0	0	—		—		29	4
Ternana (loan)	2018–19	Serie C	33	5	0	0	—		—		33	5
Juve Stabia (loan)	2019–20	Serie B	26	2	0	0	—		—		26	2
Padova	2020–21	Serie C	26	5	0	0	—		5 (Note: All appearance(s) in Serie C play-off.)	0	31	5
Padova	2021–22	Serie C	23	4	8	3	—		4	0	35	7
Padova	2022–23	Serie C	0	0	3	1	—		—		3	1
Total			49	9	11	4	—		9	0	69	13
Taranto	2022–23	Serie C	0	0	0	0	—		0	0	0	0
Career total			175	24	12	4	—		11	0	199	28
