= Emanuele Maurizii =

Italian footballer (born 2001)

Personal information
- Date of birth: 2 February 2001 (age 25)
- Place of birth: Sant'Omero, Italy
- Height: 1.75 m (5 ft 9 in)
- Position: Left back

Team information
- Current team: Club Milano

Youth career
- –2016: Alba Adriatica
- 2016–2020: Ascoli

Senior career*
Years	Team	Apps	(Gls)
2020–2022	Ascoli	0	(0)
2020–2021	→ Matelica (loan)	12	(0)
2021–2022	→ Ancona-Matelica (loan)	15	(0)
2022–2024	Pro Sesto	66	(1)
2024–2025	Ascoli	14	(0)
2025–	Club Milano	21	(0)
- * Club domestic league appearances and goals as of 25 June 2026

Emanuele Maurizii (born 2 February 2001) is an Italian professional footballer who plays as a left back for Serie D club Club Milano.

== Club career ==
Born in Sant'Omero, Maurizii initially played in the Ascoli youth sector. In 2020, he was promoted to the first team.

For the 2020–21 he was loaned to Serie C club Matelica. He played 12 league matches.

On 27 July 2021, he joined Ancona-Matelica on loan.

On 25 July 2022, Maurizii signed with Pro Sesto.

On 13 August 2024, Maurizii returned to Ascoli on a one-season deal.
