= Moscati =

Moscati is an Italian surname. Notable people with the surname include:

- Giuseppe Moscati (1880-1927), Italian doctor and Catholic saint
- Filippo Moscati (born 1992), Italian football player
- Italo Moscati (born 1937), Italian writer, film director, and screenwriter
- Marco Moscati (born 1992), Italian football player
- Pietro Moscati (1739-1824), Italian doctor and politician
- Sabatino Moscati, (1922-1997), Italian archaeologist and linguist
- Vincent Moscati, American online nosebleed-stakes poker player and live low-midstakes poker player with 8 Circuit rings
