= Sangiorgi =

Sangiorgi is a surname. Notable people with the surname include:

- Alessandro Sangiorgi (born 1999), Italian footballer
- Davide Sangiorgi, Italian computer scientist
- Giovanni Battista Sangiorgi (1784–1877), Italian painter
- Giuliano Sangiorgi (born 1979), Italian singer, songwriter and composer
- Pierluigi Sangiorgi (born 1968), Italian equestrian
