= Nicolás Bubas =

Argentine footballer

Personal information
- Full name: Sergio Nicolás Bubas
- Date of birth: 23 April 1989 (age 37)
- Place of birth: Esquel, Argentina
- Height: 1.79 m (5 ft 10 in)
- Position: Forward

Team information
- Current team: Manfredonia
- Number: 13

Youth career
- CAI

Senior career*
Years	Team	Apps	(Gls)
2009–2012	CAI	95	(16)
2012–2013	Racing de Córdoba	25	(8)
2013–2014	Real Potosí	35	(9)
2014	Metropolitanos	17	(1)
2015	Nacional Potosí	20	(6)
2015–2017	San Marcos de Arica	19	(2)
2017–2020	Vibonese	104	(32)
2020–2021	Juve Stabia	13	(1)
2021	→ Cavese (loan)	18	(7)
2021–2022	Fidelis Andria	31	(4)
2022–2023	Cavese	28	(8)
2023–2024	Gelbison	32	(5)
2024–	Manfredonia	5	(0)
- * Club domestic league appearances and goals as of 17 November 2024

Sergio Nicolás Bubas (born 23 April 1989), known as Nicolás Bubas, is an Argentine footballer who plays as a forward for Italian Serie D club Manfredonia. He also holds Italian citizenship.

== Career ==
In October 2020, he joined Juve Stabia. On 3 January 2021, he was loaned to Cavese.

On 11 August 2021, he signed with Fidelis Andria.

On 25 August 2022, Bubas returned to Cavese, now in Serie D.

== Career statistics ==
As of match played 14 May 2022

Appearances and goals by club, season and competition
Club	Season	League			National Cup		Continental		Other		Total	
Club	Season	Division	Apps	Goals	Apps	Goals	Apps	Goals	Apps	Goals	Apps	Goals
CAI	2008–09	Primera Nacional	20	2	—		—		—		20	2
CAI	2009–10	Primera Nacional	20	0	—		—		—		20	0
CAI	2010–11	Primera Nacional	28	7	—		—		—		28	7
CAI	2011–12	Torneo Argentino A	27	7	—		—		—		27	7
CAI	Total		95	16	0	0	0	0	0	0	95	16
Racing de Córdoba	2012–13	Torneo Federal A	25	8	1	1	—		—		26	9
Real Potosí	2013–14	Bolivian Primera División	35	9	—		2 (Note: Appearance(s) in Copa Sudamericana)	1	—		37	10
Metropolitanos	2014–15	Venezuelan Primera División	17	1	—		—		—		17	1
Nacional Potosí	2014–15	Bolivian Primera División	20	6	—		—		—		20	6
San Marcos de Arica	2015–16	Chilean Primera División	19	2	2	0	—		—		21	2
Vibonese	2016–17	Lega Pro	13	2	0	0	—		2 (Note: Appearance(s) in Relegation Playoffs)	2	15	4
Vibonese	2017–18	Serie D	32	15	—		—		5 (Note: Appearance(s) in Promotion Playoffs)	2	37	17
Vibonese	2018–19	Serie C	33	6	0	0	—		—		33	6
Vibonese	2019–20	Serie C	26	9	—		—		—		26	9
Vibonese	Total		104	32	0	0	0	0	7	4	111	36
Juve Stabia	2020–21	Serie C	13	1	—		—		—		13	1
Cavese (loan)	2020–21	Serie C	18	7	—		—		—		18	7
Fidelis Andria	2021–22	Serie C	33	4	—		—		2	0	35	4
Career total			379	86	3	1	2	1	9	4	393	92
