= Olger Merkaj =

Albanian footballer

Personal information
- Date of birth: 23 July 1997 (age 29)
- Place of birth: Vlorë, Albania
- Height: 1.82 m (6 ft 0 in)
- Positions: Right winger; forward

Team information
- Current team: Castellanzese
- Number: 9

Youth career
- 2012–2016: Sampdoria

Senior career*
Years	Team	Apps	(Gls)
2016–2017	Sampdoria	0	(0)
2016–2017	→ Tuttocuoio (loan)	11	(2)
2017	Casale	16	(2)
2017–2019	Chieri	48	(11)
2019–2020	US Breno	20	(7)
2020–2021	Bra	37	(18)
2021–2022	Foggia	17	(2)
2022	Campobasso	16	(1)
2022	Trapani	10	(2)
2022–2023	Luparense	13	(1)
2023	Derthona	14	(2)
2023–2024	Vado	22	(7)
2024	Fiorenzuola	10	(1)
2025	Vado	17	(2)
2025–	Castellanzese	29	(0)
- * Club domestic league appearances and goals as of 2 August 2026

Olger Merkaj (born 23 July 1997) is an Albanian professional footballer who plays as a right winger or forward for Italian Serie D club Castellanzese.

== Club career ==
=== Early life and youth career ===
Merkaj was born in Vlorë, Albania and moved to Italy aged 8. He started his youth career at Sampdoria in 2012.

=== Tuttocuoio ===
On 26 June 2016 Merkaj was loaned to Lega Pro side Tuttocuoio. He made it his club debut on 31 July 2016 in the 2015–16 Coppa Italia match against Casertana coming on as a substitute in the 83rd minute in place of Irakli Shekiladze.

=== Chieri ===
On 2 December 2017 Casale announced that Merkaj moved to fellow Serie D side Chieri. Four days later Merkaj debuted for Chieri with a goal in the Coppa Italia Serie D 3 round against Unione Sanremo. Merkaj's goal came in the 31st minute, 4 minutes after the opening goal of the match scored by Unione Sanremo and served to end the match in the 1–1, where then advanced in the penalty shoot-out where Merkaj's side was defeated 4–2.

=== Foggia ===
On 9 July 2021, he signed with Serie C club Foggia.

=== Campobasso ===
On 21 January 2022, he moved to Campobasso.

=== Trapani ===
On 14 September 2022, he joined Trapani.

=== Luparense ===
On 5 December 2022, Merkaj left Trapani to join Luparense.

== International career ==
Merkaj received his first international call up at the Albania national under-17 football team by coach Džemal Mustedanagić for the 2014 UEFA European Under-17 Championship elite round. However, due to health problems he was sent to a hospital in Czech Republic and was unable to participate in the tournament. He was visited at hospital by 4 Captains of all Group 4 youth national teams, Keidi Bare of Albania U17, Ryan Ledson of England U17, Filippo Romagna of Italy U17 and David Záleský of Czech Republic U17.

Following a good season with Tuttocuoio in the 2016–17 Lega Pro's first-half he received his first call-up at the Albania national under-21 football team by coach Alban Bushi for a gathering from 21 to 28 January 2017.

== Career statistics ==
=== Club ===
As of match played 24 April 2022

Club statistics
Club	Season	League			National cup		Other		Total	
Club	Season	Division	Apps	Goals	Apps	Goals	Apps	Goals	Apps	Goals
Tuttocuoio	2016–17	Lega Pro	10	2	1	0	1 (Note: Appearance(s) in Relegation Playoffs)	0	12	2
Casale	2017–18	Serie D	16	2	—		—		16	2
Chieri	2017–18	Serie D	17	6	—		2 (Note: Appearance(s) in Promotion Playoffs)	0	19	6
Chieri	2018–19	Serie D	31	5	1	0	—		32	5
Chieri	Total		48	11	1	0	2	0	51	11
US Breno	2019–20	Serie D	20	7	—		—		20	7
Bra	2020–21	Serie D	37	18	—		1	0	38	18
Foggia	2021–22	Serie C	17	2	—		—		17	2
Campobasso	2021–22	Serie C	16	1	—		—		16	1
Career total			164	43	2	0	4	0	170	43
