= Luca Villa =

Italian footballer

Personal information
- Date of birth: 14 November 1999 (age 27)
- Place of birth: Segrate, Italy
- Height: 1.72 m (5 ft 8 in)
- Position: Left back

Team information
- Current team: Salernitana
- Number: 14

Youth career
- –2015: Monza
- 2015–2016: Renate

Senior career*
Years	Team	Apps	(Gls)
2016–2017	Renate	0	(0)
2017–2023	Pergolettese	167	(6)
2023–2025	Padova	65	(5)
2025–	Salernitana	34	(2)
- * Club domestic league appearances and goals as of 1 May 2026

Luca Villa (born 14 November 1999) is an Italian professional footballer who plays as a left back for Serie C Group C club Salernitana.

== Club career ==
Born in Segrate, Villa started his career in Monza and Renate youth system. He was promoted to Renate first team for the 2016–17 season.

He joined Serie D club Pergolettese in 2017, and won the promotion in 2018–19 Serie D season. Villa was named the captain team in 2020, and played his 100 match for Pergolettese on 25 November 2020 against Pro Vercelli.

On 14 June 2023 he joined Padova.

== Honours ==
Pergolettese

- Serie D (Group D): 2018–19
