= Raphael Odogwu =

Italianfootballer

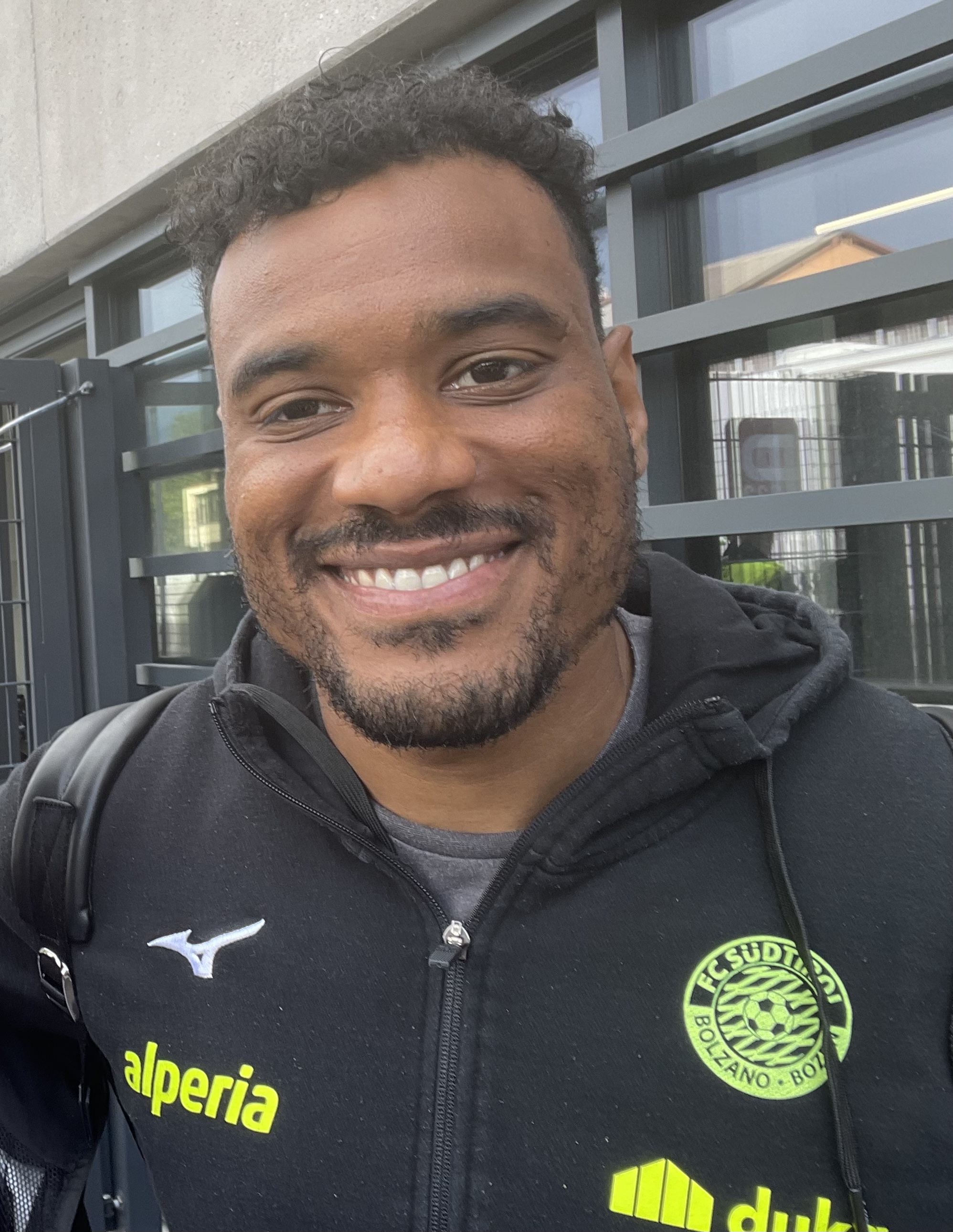

Personal information
- Full name: Raphael Chidi Odogwu
- Date of birth: 28 January 1991 (age 35)
- Place of birth: Verona, Italy
- Height: 1.88 m (6 ft 2 in)
- Position: Striker

Team information
- Current team: Treviso
- Number: 91

Senior career*
Years	Team	Apps	(Gls)
2007–2014	Virtus Verona	162	(31)
2014–2015	Real Vicenza	12	(0)
2015	Renate	16	(0)
2015–2016	Altovicentino	30	(17)
2016–2019	Arzignano	79	(35)
2019–2020	Virtus Verona	27	(8)
2020–2026	Südtirol	178	(31)
2026–	Treviso	1	(1)
- * Club domestic league appearances and goals as of 23 August 2026

Raphael Chidi Odogwu (born 28 January 1991) is an Italian professional footballer who plays as a forward for Serie C Group A club Treviso.

== Club career ==
Raphael Chidi Odogwu started his professional career with his childhood club Virtus Verona. He later had stints with Real Vicenza, Renate, Altovicentino, and Arzignano before returning to Virtus Verona in 2019. On 24 July 2020 he signed a 2-year contract with Südtirol where he is still playing (2026).

== Career statistics ==
As of match played on 21 October 2023

Club statistics
Club	Season	League			National Cup		Other		Total	
Club	Season	Division	Apps	Goals	Apps	Goals	Apps	Goals	Apps	Goals
Virtus Verona	2013–14	Lega Pro Seconda Divisione	30	4	0	0	—		30	4
Real Vicenza	2014–15	Lega Pro	12	0	0	0	2 (Note: Appearances in the Coppa Italia Lega Pro)	0	14	0
Renate	2014–15	Lega Pro	16	0	0	0	1	0	17	0
Altovicentino	2015–16	Serie D	30	17	0	0	1 (Note: Appearance in the 2015–16 Serie D Promotion play-offs)	0	31	17
Union ArzignanoChiampo	2016–17	Serie D	17	6	0	0	—		17	6
Union ArzignanoChiampo	2017–18	Serie D	31	16	0	0	3 (Note: Two appearances in the 2017–18 Serie D Promotion play-offs and One appearance in the Coppa Italia Serie D)	3	34	19
Union ArzignanoChiampo	2018–19	Serie D	31	13	0	0	2 (Note: Appearances in the Coppa Italia Serie D)	0	33	13
Union ArzignanoChiampo	Total		79	35	0	0	5	3	84	38
Virtus Verona	2019–20	Serie C	27	8	0	0	3 (Note: Appearances in the Coppa Italia Serie C)	1	30	9
Südtirol	2020–21	Serie C	12	1	1	0	4 (Note: Appearances in the 2020–21 Serie C Promotion play-offs)	1	17	2
Südtirol	2021–22	Serie C	32	5	1	0	7	3	40	8
Südtirol	2022–23	Serie B	37	9	1	0	3 (Note: Appearances in the 2022–23 Serie B Promotion play-offs)	0	41	9
Südtirol	2023–24	Serie B	9	3	1	0	—		10	3
Südtirol	Total		90	18	4	0	14	4	108	22
Career totals			284	82	4	0	26	8	314	90

== Personal life ==
Odogwu was born in Italy to a Nigerian father and an Italian mother. His father is from the Igbo tribe.
