= Hannes Fink =

Italian footballer

Personal information
- Date of birth: 6 October 1989 (age 37)
- Place of birth: Bolzano, Italy
- Height: 1.85 m (6 ft 1 in)
- Position: Midfielder

Youth career
- Südtirol

Senior career*
Years	Team	Apps	(Gls)
2007–2022	Südtirol	291	(15)
- * Club domestic league appearances and goals as of 10 May 2022

Hannes Fink (born 6 October 1989) is an Italian former footballer who played his whole career for Südtirol.

== Career ==
A midfielder, Fink started his career with Italian fourth division side Südtirol, where he received interest from the Italian second division, helping them achieve promotion to the Italian third division. He played a total fifteen years for Südtirol, and retired by the end of the 2021–22 Serie C season, following his team's first ever promotion to Serie B.
