= Alessandro Faggioli =

Italian football player (born 2000)

Personal information
- Date of birth: 2 February 2000 (age 26)
- Place of birth: Penne, Italy
- Height: 1.80 m (5 ft 11 in)
- Position: Forward

Team information
- Current team: Sambenedettese
- Number: 7

Youth career
- –2019: Teramo

Senior career*
Years	Team	Apps	(Gls)
2017–2020	Pescara	0	(0)
2017–2018	→ Teramo	4	(0)
2019	→ Cerignola (loan)	3	(0)
2019–2020	→ San Nicolò Notaresco (loan)	13	(0)
2020–2021	Castelnuovo Vomano	26	(4)
2021–2022	Ancona-Matelica	36	(14)
2022–2024	Virtus Entella	53	(7)
2024	→ Arzignano (loan)	14	(2)
2024	Campobasso	1	(0)
2024–2025	Cerignola	10	(0)
2025–2026	Triestina	32	(5)
2026–	Sambenedettese	0	(0)
- * Club domestic league appearances and goals as of 30 April 2026

Alessandro Faggioli (born 2 February 2000) is an Italian footballer who plays as a forward for Serie C Group B club Sambenedettese.

== Club career ==
He made his Serie C debut for Teramo on 27 August 2017 in a game against Mestre.

On 8 July 2021, he signed with Ancona-Matelica.

On 21 July 2022, Faggioli moved to Virtus Entella.

On 31 January 2024, Faggioli was loaned by Arzignano.

On 18 July 2024, he signed a 3-years deal for Campobasso. However, on 30 August 2024, he returned to Cerignola for two seasons.
