= Filippo Carini =

Italian footballer

Personal information
- Date of birth: 26 September 1990 (age 36)
- Place of birth: Valsamoggia, Italy
- Height: 1.90 m (6 ft 3 in)
- Position: Defender

Team information
- Current team: Mestre

Youth career
- –2010: Modena

Senior career*
Years	Team	Apps	(Gls)
2010–2014	Modena	39	(2)
2013	→ Pisa (loan)	13	(0)
2013–2014	→ Padova (loan)	29	(0)
2014–2015	Lecce	7	(0)
2015	L'Aquila	9	(0)
2015–2017	Mantova	51	(2)
2017	Forlì	16	(0)
2017–2018	Paganese	28	(1)
2018–2021	Imolese	98	(1)
2021–2023	Trento	39	(2)
2023–	Mestre	8	(1)
- * Club domestic league appearances and goals as of 24 September 2023

Filippo Carini (born 26 September 1990) is an Italian footballer who plays as a defender for Serie D club Mestre.

== Club career ==
He made his Serie B debut for Modena on 28 August 2010 in a game against Ascoli.

In July 2018, he signed a one-year contract with Imolese.

On 29 July 2021, he joined Trento. On 30 January 2023, Carini's contract with Trento was terminated by mutual consent.
