= Carlo Caporali =

Italian footballer (born 1994)

Personal information
- Date of birth: 27 April 1994 (age 32)
- Place of birth: Vicenza, Italy
- Height: 1.85 m (6 ft 1 in)
- Position: Midfielder

Team information
- Current team: Caratese
- Number: 17

Youth career
- Padova

Senior career*
Years	Team	Apps	(Gls)
2011–2012	Montecchio Maggiore	30	(2)
2013–2015	Real Vicenza	39	(2)
2015–2016	Este	37	(5)
2016–2017	AltoVicentino	32	(2)
2017–2019	Campodarsego	67	(7)
2019–2022	Trento	66	(5)
2022–2023	Sant'Angelo	20	(0)
2023	Ponte San Pietro	16	(0)
2023–	Caratese	2	(0)
- * Club domestic league appearances and goals as of 20 December 2023

Carlo Caporali (born 27 April 1994) is an Italian professional footballer who plays as an attacking midfielder for Serie D club Caratese.

== Club career ==
Born in Vicenza, Caporali made his senior debut for Serie D club Montecchio Maggiore on 2011–12 season.

On 3 September 2015, he signed for Este.

In July 2017, he joined Serie D club Campodarsego.

On 9 July 2019, he signed for Trento.

On 15 September 2022, Caporali moved to Sant'Angelo in Serie D.
