= Luca Belcastro (footballer) =

Italian footballer

Personal information
- Date of birth: 23 April 1991 (age 35)
- Place of birth: Locri, Italy
- Height: 1.83 m (6 ft 0 in)
- Position: Midfielder

Team information
- Current team: Progresso

Youth career
- Juventus

Senior career*
Years	Team	Apps	(Gls)
2011–2015	Carrarese	103	(15)
2015–2017	Viterbese	35	(5)
2017–2020	Imolese	73	(24)
2020–2023	Trento	88	(18)
2023	Arzignano	14	(1)
2023–2024	Cjarlins Muzane	30	(6)
2024–2025	Ancona	27	(2)
2025–	Progresso	13	(2)
- * Club domestic league appearances and goals as of 28 February 2026

Luca Belcastro (born 23 April 1991) is an Italian professional footballer who plays as a midfielder for Serie D club Progresso.

== Club career ==
Born in Locri, Belcastro was formed in Juventus Primavera.

On 14 July 2011, he left Juventus and joined to Carrarese. He made his Serie C debut on 21 September 2011 against Cremonese.

On 22 July 2017, he signed for Imolese. He played for three seasons in the club, and won the promotion to Serie C in 2017–18 Serie D season.

On 3 October 2020, he joined Serie D club Trento as a free agent. He won the promotion to Serie C on his first season.

On 4 January 2023, Belcastro moved to Arzignano.

== Honours ==
Viterbese

- Serie D: 2015–16
