= Arensi Rota =

Greek footballer

Personal information
- Date of birth: 7 December 1995 (age 30)
- Place of birth: Korçë, Albania
- Height: 1.78 m (5 ft 10 in)
- Position: Defender

Team information
- Current team: Sanremese
- Number: 97

Youth career
- –2014: Aris

Senior career*
Years	Team	Apps	(Gls)
2014–2016	Panargiakos		
2016–2017	Panegialios	28	(0)
2017–2020	Monopoli	85	(0)
2020–2022	Carrarese	32	(1)
2022–2024	Alessandria	66	(1)
2024–2025	Chania	10	(0)
2025–2026	Cassino	9	(0)
2026–	Sanremese	14	(2)
- * Club domestic league appearances and goals as of 25 June 2026

Arensi Rota (born 7 December 1995) is a Greek professional footballer who plays as a defender for Italian Serie D club Sanremese.

== Club career ==
On 25 August 2022, Rota signed a two-year contract with Alessandria.
