= Matteo Figoli =

Italian footballer

Personal information
- Date of birth: 17 December 2000 (age 25)
- Place of birth: Sarzana, Italy
- Height: 1.80 m (5 ft 11 in)
- Position: Midfielder

Team information
- Current team: Carpi
- Number: 5

Youth career
- Spezia

Senior career*
Years	Team	Apps	(Gls)
2018–2022	Spezia	0	(0)
2019–2020	→ Pianese (loan)	16	(1)
2020–2021	→ Pergolettese (loan)	23	(1)
2021–2022	→ Carrarese (loan)	30	(3)
2022–2024	Pergolettese	58	(2)
2024–	Carpi	68	(3)
- * Club domestic league appearances and goals as of 30 April 2026

Matteo Figoli (born 17 December 2000) is an Italian professional footballer who plays as a midfielder for Serie C Group A club Carpi.

== Club career ==
Born in Sarzana, Figoli starter his career in Spezia youth sector. He was promoted to the first team in 2018.

On 19 July 2019, he was loaned to Serie C club Pianese. He made his professional debut on 25 August 2019 against Pro Vercelli.

On 17 August 2020, he joined Pergolettese on loan.

For the 2021–22 season, he was loaned to Carrarese.

On 19 July 2022, Figoli returned to Pergolettese on a two-year contract.

On 12 July 2024, Figoli signed a two-year contract with Carpi.
