= Mattia De Rigo =

Italian footballer

Personal information
- Date of birth: 13 March 2001 (age 25)
- Place of birth: Italy
- Position: Forward

Team information
- Current team: Chievo Sona

Youth career
- –2018: Vicenza
- 2018: → Virtus Entella (loan)
- 2018–2021: Virtus Entella
- 2020: → Torino (loan)

Senior career*
Years	Team	Apps	(Gls)
2018–2022	Virtus Entella	1	(0)
2020–2022	→ Virtus Verona (loan)	18	(0)
2022–	Chievo Sona	1	(0)
- * Club domestic league appearances and goals as of 18 September 2022

Mattia De Rigo (born 13 March 2001) is an Italian professional footballer who plays as a forward for Serie D club Chievo Sona.

== Career ==
De Rigo joined to Virtus Entella in 2018. On 31 January 2020, as a youth, he was loaned to Torino. He made his Serie C debut, as a late substitute, on 23 December 2018 against Juventus U23.

For the 2020–21 season, he was loaned to Virtus Verona. On 25 July 2021, the loan was extended one year.

== Honours ==
Virtus Entella

- Serie C: 2018–19 (Group A)
