= Ruggero Riva =

Italian footballer

Personal information
- Date of birth: 24 July 1990 (age 36)
- Place of birth: Ponte San Pietro, Italy
- Height: 1.83 m (6 ft 0 in)
- Position: Defender

Team information
- Current team: Franciacorta

Youth career
- –2007: Tritium

Senior career*
Years	Team	Apps	(Gls)
2007–2013	Tritium	133	(1)
2013–2016	Renate	78	(1)
2016–2019	Monza	90	(0)
2019–2022	AlbinoLeffe	76	(0)
- * Club domestic league appearances and goals as of 24 April 2022

Ruggero Riva (born 24 July 1990) is an Italian professional football player who plays for Serie D club Franciacorta.

== Club career ==
On 15 January 2019, he signed with AlbinoLeffe.

On 1 July 2022, Riva joined Serie D club Franciacorta.

== Honours ==
=== Club ===
Tritium Calcio

- Serie D: 2009–10
- Lega Pro Seconda Divisione: 2010–11

Monza

- Serie D: 2016–17
