= Gabriele Gibilterra =

Italian footballer

Personal information
- Date of birth: 1 January 2000 (age 26)
- Place of birth: Syracuse, Italy
- Height: 1.71 m (5 ft 7 in)
- Position: Winger

Team information
- Current team: Cjarlins Muzane

Youth career
- –2019: Genoa
- 2019: → SPAL (loan)

Senior career*
| Years | Team | Apps | (Gls) |
| 2018–2019 | Genoa | 0 | (0) |
| 2018–2019 | → Albissola (loan) | 5 | (0) |
| 2019–2020 | Foggia | 11 | (1) |
| 2020–2021 | Robur Siena | 13 | (0) |
| 2021–2022 | Lucchese | 11 | (0) |
| 2022 | Termoli | 4 | (1) |
| 2023 | Arzachena | 14 | (3) |
| 2023–2023 | Ghiviborgo | 16 | (1) |
| 2024– | Cjarlins Muzane | 0 | (0) |
- * Club domestic league appearances and goals as of 20 December 2023

Gabriele Gibilterra (born 1 January 2000) is an Italian professional footballer who plays as a winger for Serie D club Cjarlins Muzane.

== Club career ==
Born in Syracuse, Gibilterra started his career in Genoa youth system. For the 2018–19 season, he was loaned to Serie C club Albissola. He made his professional debut on 14 October 2018 against Piacenza.

On 5 October 2019, he signed with Serie D club Foggia as a free agent.

After one season, on 29 October 2020 he joined Serie D club Robur Siena.

On 12 August 2021, he returned to Serie C and signed with Lucchese.
