= Marco Simonelli =

Italian footballer

Personal information
- Date of birth: 28 February 2000 (age 26)
- Place of birth: Rome, Italy
- Height: 1.77 m (5 ft 10 in)
- Position: Midfielder

Team information
- Current team: Ostia Mare
- Number: 20

Youth career
- –2016: Savio Calcio
- 2016–2019: → Frosinone (loan)

Senior career*
Years	Team	Apps	(Gls)
2019–2023	Viterbese	60	(4)
2022	→ Fermana (loan)	6	(0)
2023	Flaminia	10	(0)
2023–	Ostia Mare	13	(2)
- * Club domestic league appearances and goals as of 20 December 2023

Marco Simonelli (born 28 February 2000) is an Italian professional footballer who plays as a midfielder for Serie D club Ostia Mare.

== Club career ==
Formed in Savio Calcio youth sector, Simonelli joined to Serie C club Viterbese in 2019. He extended his contract with the club in March 2020.

On 31 January 2022, Simonelli was loaned to Fermana.

On 20 January 2023, Simonelli moved to Serie D club Flaminia.
