= Kevin Varas =

Ecuadorian footballer (born 1993)

Personal information
- Full name: Jonnathan Kevin Varas Marcillo
- Date of birth: 26 May 1993 (age 33)
- Place of birth: Guayaquil, Ecuador
- Height: 1.70 m (5 ft 7 in)
- Position: Midfielder

Team information
- Current team: Padova
- Number: 7

Youth career
- Darfo Boario

Senior career*
| Years | Team | Apps | (Gls) |
| 2011–2012 | Darfo Boario | 48 | (6) |
| 2012–2015 | AC Vallecamonica | ? | (27) |
| 2015–2017 | Lumezzane | 81 | (5) |
| 2017–2018 | Teramo | 30 | (1) |
| 2018–2019 | AC Rezzato | 32 | (4) |
| 2019–2020 | Pro Vercelli | 21 | (2) |
| 2020–2023 | Pergolettese | 108 | (22) |
| 2023– | Padova | 103 | (14) |
- * Club domestic league appearances and goals as of 13 May 2026

Jonnathan Kevin Varas Marcillo (born 26 May 1993) is an Ecuadorian professional footballer who plays as a midfielder for Serie B club Padova.

== Club career ==
Formed on Darfo Boario youth system, Varas made his senior debut for the first team in 2011–12 Serie D season.

On 4 August 2020, he joined Serie C club Pergolettese.

On 11 July 2023, Varas signed a two-year contract with Padova.
