= Mauro Semprini =

Italian footballer

Personal information
- Date of birth: 15 April 1998 (age 28)
- Place of birth: Rome, Italy
- Height: 1.85 m (6 ft 1 in)
- Position: Forward

Team information
- Current team: Sambenedettese
- Number: 19

Youth career
- –2015: Lupa Roma
- 2015–2018: Virtus Entella

Senior career*
Years	Team	Apps	(Gls)
2018–2019	Ponsacco	34	(7)
2019–2021	Pontedera	46	(6)
2020–2021	→ Südtirol (loan)	6	(0)
2021–2023	Lucchese	44	(9)
2023	Taranto	10	(0)
2023–2024	Fermana	21	(1)
2024–2025	Siena	19	(3)
2025–2026	Villa Valle	20	(8)
2026–	Sambenedettese	5	(0)
- * Club domestic league appearances and goals as of 30 April 2026

Mauro Semprini (born 15 April 1998) is an Italian professional footballer who plays as a forward for Serie C Group B club Sambenedettese.

== Club career ==
Born in Rome, Semprini finished his formation in Virtus Entella youth sector.

On 3 August 2018, he joined Serie D club Ponsacco.

On 13 July 2019, he signed with Serie C club Pontedera. Semprini made his professional debut on 24 August 2019 against Carrrarese.

On 16 August 2020, he was loaned to Südtirol. His loan ended on 16 January 2021.

He left Pontedera for the 2021–22 season. On 9 August 2021 he joined Serie C club Lucchese.

On 12 January 2023, Semprini moved to Taranto.
