= Marco Piccoli =

Italian footballer

Personal information
- Date of birth: 30 October 2001 (age 25)
- Place of birth: Bergamo, Italy
- Height: 1.78 m (5 ft 10 in)
- Position: Midfielder

Team information
- Current team: Sambenedettese
- Number: 6

Youth career
- –2020: AlbinoLeffe

Senior career*
Years	Team	Apps	(Gls)
2020–2024	AlbinoLeffe	110	(2)
2024–2025	Rimini	42	(3)
2025–	Sambenedettese	20	(1)
- * Club domestic league appearances and goals as of 30 April 2026

Marco Piccoli (born 30 October 2001) is an Italian professional footballer who plays as a midfielder for Serie C Group B club Sambenedettese.

== Club career ==
On 3 September 2024, Piccoli signed a two-season contract with Rimini.
