= Federico Simonti =

Italian footballer (born 2000)

Personal information
- Date of birth: 14 June 2000 (age 26)
- Place of birth: Bagno a Ripoli, Italy
- Height: 1.87 m (6 ft 2 in)
- Position: Left back

Team information
- Current team: Sangiovannese

Youth career
- –2021: Fiorentina

Senior career*
Years	Team	Apps	(Gls)
2020–2021	Fiorentina	0	(0)
2020–2021	→ Pistoiese (loan)	31	(0)
2021–2023	Trento	37	(1)
2023–	Sangiovannese	12	(0)
- * Club domestic league appearances and goals as of 20 December 2023

Federico Simonti (born 14 June 2000) is an Italian professional footballer who plays as a left back for Serie D club Sangiovannese.

== Club career ==
Born in Bagno a Ripoli, Simonti started his career in Fiorentina Primavera. He was the captain of the team, and won two Coppa Italia Primavera.

On 28 August 2020, he was loaned to Serie C club Pistoiese. He made his professional debut on 27 September 2020 against Alessandria.

On 20 July 2021, he left Fiorentina and signed with Serie C club Trento. On 1 September 2023, Simonti's contract with Trento was terminated by mutual consent.
