= Alessandro Corti =

Italian footballer (born 2000)

Personal information
- Date of birth: 21 June 2000 (age 26)
- Place of birth: Sesto San Giovanni, Italy
- Height: 1.87 m (6 ft 2 in)
- Position: Forward

Youth career
- –2018: Giana Erminio

Senior career*
Years	Team	Apps	(Gls)
2018–2022	Giana Erminio	64	(9)
2018–2019	→ Villa Valle (loan)	39	(7)
2022–2023	Pergolettese	6	(0)
2023–2024	Olbia	24	(0)
- * Club domestic league appearances and goals as of 28 January 2024

Alessandro Corti (born 21 June 2000) is an Italian professional footballer who plays as a forward.

== Club career ==
Formed on Giana Erminio youth system, Corti was loaned to Serie D club Villa Valle for the 2018–19 season. He made his debut with the first team and Serie C on 22 January 2020 against Renate.

On 20 July 2021, he renewed his contract with the club.

On 16 July 2022, Corti signed a two-year contract with Pergolettese.

On 30 January 2023, Corti moved to Olbia on a 1.5-year deal. Corti left Olbia by mutual consent on 1 February 2024.
