= Giacomo Tomaselli =

Italian footballer (born 1999)

Personal information
- Date of birth: 25 July 1999 (age 27)
- Place of birth: Borgosesia, Italy
- Height: 1.75 m (5 ft 9 in)
- Position: Winger

Team information
- Current team: Latina
- Number: 70

Youth career
- –2016: Borgosesia

Senior career*
Years	Team	Apps	(Gls)
2016–2018	Borgosesia	65	(9)
2018–2020	Monza	15	(0)
2019–2020	→ Gozzano (loan)	26	(1)
2020–2023	AlbinoLeffe	85	(6)
2023–2025	Entella	53	(5)
2025	→ Feralpisalò (loan)	4	(0)
2025–2026	Pergolettese	17	(0)
2026–	Latina	13	(0)
- * Club domestic league appearances and goals as of 1 May 2026

Giacomo Tomaselli (born 25 July 1999) is an Italian professional footballer who plays as a winger for Serie C Group B club Latina.

== Career ==
On 24 January 2018, Tomaselli joined Serie C club Monza from Borgosesia. On 9 July 2019, he moved to Gozzano on loan. On 11 August 2020, AlbinoLeffe announced the signing of Tomaselli on a permanent deal.

On 30 January 2023, Tomaselli signed with Entella.
