= Dion Ruffo Luci =

Italian footballer (born 2001)

Personal information
- Date of birth: 12 July 2001 (age 25)
- Place of birth: Bologna, Italy
- Height: 1.79 m (5 ft 10 in)
- Position: Midfielder

Team information
- Current team: US Corticella

Senior career*
Years	Team	Apps	(Gls)
2020–2023	Bologna	1	(0)
2021–2023	→ Trento (loan)	33	(1)
2023	→ Turris (loan)	4	(1)
2023	Rimini	0	(0)
2023–	US Corticella	0	(0)
- * Club domestic league appearances and goals as of 21:08, 2 October 2023 (UTC)

Dion Ruffo Luci (born 12 July 2001) is an Italian professional footballer who plays midfielder for Serie D club US Corticella.

== Club career ==
Ruffo Luci made his professional debut with Bologna in a 2–2 Serie A tie with Parma on 12 July 2020.

On 26 July 2021, he was loaned to Trento on a two-year loan.

On 31 January 2023, Ruffo Luci moved on a new loan to Turris.

On 2 August 2023, Ruffo Luci signed with Rimini for one year, with an optional second year.

On 2 October 2023, Ruffo Luci signed for Serie D club US Corticella.
