= Simone Bonalumi =

Italian footballer

Personal information
- Date of birth: 23 December 1994 (age 31)
- Place of birth: Sesto San Giovanni, Italy
- Height: 1.93 m (6 ft 4 in)
- Position: Centre back

Senior career*
Years	Team	Apps	(Gls)
2012–2013	Base 96		
2013–2019	Giana Erminio	173	(7)
2019–2020	Arzignano Valchiampo	17	(2)
2020–2022	Giana Erminio	61	(1)
2022	Gelbison	14	(1)
- * Club domestic league appearances and goals as of 23 December 2022

Simone Bonalumi (born 23 December 1994) is an Italian professional footballer who plays as a centre back.

== Club career ==
Bonalumi started his career in Eccellenza club Base 96, and in 2013–14 season he joined to Serie D club Giana Erminio. He won the promotion with his new club at the first season, and made his Serie C debut on 5 September 2014 against Lumezzane.

On 30 August 2019, he joined to Arzignano Valchiampo.

After one season, Bonalumi returned to Giana Erminio.

On 25 July 2022, Bonalumi signed with Gelbison, freshly promoted to Serie C. His contract with Gelbison was terminated by mutual consent on 21 December 2022.
