= Alex Rolfini =

Italian footballer (born 1996)

Personal information
- Date of birth: 1 September 1996 (age 30)
- Place of birth: Portomaggiore, Italy
- Height: 1.80 m (5 ft 11 in)
- Position: Forward

Team information
- Current team: Alcione
- Number: 14

Senior career*
Years	Team	Apps	(Gls)
2014–2015	Portuense	32	(16)
2015–2016	Virtus Castelfranco	34	(15)
2016–2020	Carpi	0	(0)
2016–2017	→ Carrarese (loan)	24	(2)
2017–2018	→ Fano (loan)	18	(2)
2018–2019	→ Gozzano (loan)	32	(2)
2019–2020	→ Fermana (loan)	8	(0)
2020	→ Fano (loan)	4	(0)
2020–2021	Legnago Salus	29	(3)
2021–2022	Ancona-Matelica	37	(18)
2022–2025	Vicenza	80	(21)
2025–2026	Catania	16	(0)
2026–	Alcione	0	(0)
- * Club domestic league appearances and goals as of 23 August 2026

Alex Rolfini (born 1 September 1996) is an Italian professional footballer who plays as a forward for Serie C Group A club Alcione.

== Club career ==
He made his Serie C debut for Carrarese on 28 August 2016 in a game against Giana Erminio.

On 2 September 2019, he was loaned to Fermana. On 24 January 2020, he moved on another loan to Fano.

On 7 September 2020 he signed with Legnago Salus.

On 13 July 2021, he moved to Ancona-Matelica.

On 10 July 2025, Rolfini signed a contract with Catania in Serie C.
