= Tino Parisi =

Italian footballer

Personal information
- Full name: Agatino Parisi
- Date of birth: 14 June 1995 (age 31)
- Place of birth: Syracuse, Italy
- Height: 1.75 m (5 ft 9 in)
- Position: Centre back

Team information
- Current team: Ragusa
- Number: 15

Youth career
- –2012: Catania

Senior career*
| Years | Team | Apps | (Gls) |
| 2012–2017 | Catania | 46 | (0) |
| 2012–2014 | → Akragas (loan) | | |
| 2017–2018 | Siracusa | 32 | (4) |
| 2018–2021 | Livorno | 37 | (2) |
| 2019 | → Siracusa (loan) | 11 | (0) |
| 2019–2020 | → Sicula Leonzio (loan) | 24 | (0) |
| 2021–2023 | Piacenza | 60 | (1) |
| 2023–2024 | Modica | | |
| 2024– | Ragusa | 12 | (0) |
- * Club domestic league appearances and goals as of 17 November 2024

Agatino "Tino" Parisi (born 14 June 1995) is an Italian footballer who plays as a centre back for Serie D club Ragusa.

== Club career ==
He made his Serie B debut for Catania on 12 October 2014 in a game against Bari.

On 7 June 2018, he returned to Serie B after three seasons in Serie C, signing with Livorno.

On 17 January 2019, he returned to Siracusa on loan until the end of the 2018–19 season.

On 20 July 2019, he joined Sicula Leonzio on loan.

On 25 June 2021, he joined Piacenza on a two-year contract.

On 22 November 2023, Parisi signed with Modica in the fifth-tier Eccellenza.
