= Stadio Gaetano Bonolis =

Coordinates: 42°39′27″N 13°41′56″E

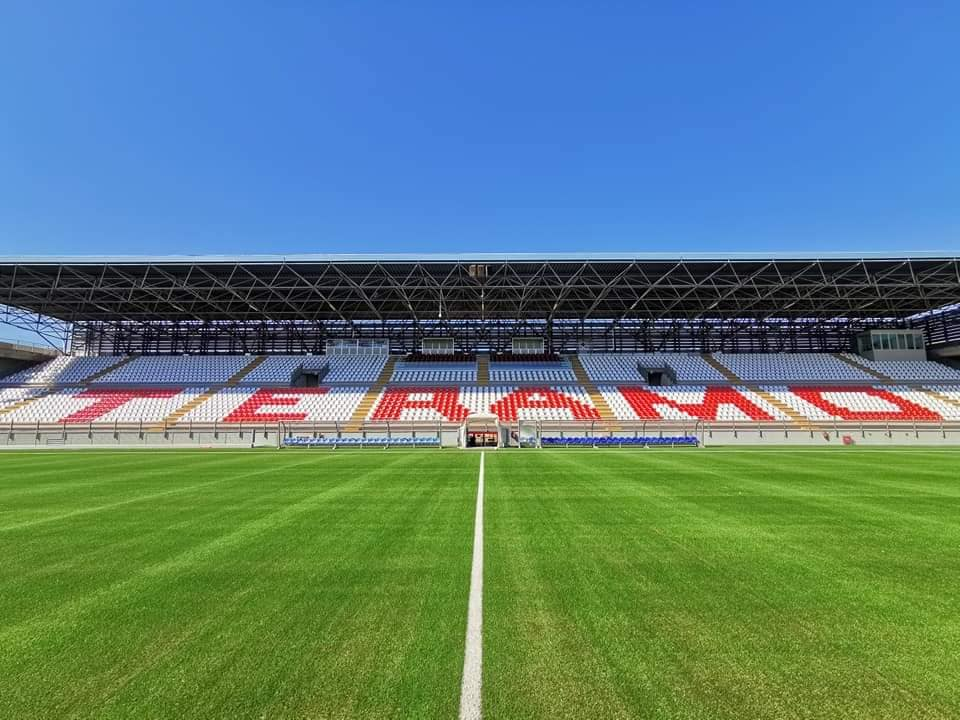
- Bonolis tribuna
- Interactive map of Stadio Gaetano Bonolis
- Location: Teramo, Italy
- Owner: Municipality of Teramo
- Capacity: 7,498 (22,000 for concerts)
- Surface: Grass

Construction
- Opened: 2008

Tenant
- Teramo

Stadio Gaetano Bonolis (also known as Stadio di Piano d'Accio) is a multi-use stadium in Piano d'Accio frazione, in Teramo, Italy. It is currently used mostly for football matches and concerts. It is the home ground of Teramo Calcio. The stadium capacity is 7,498.

The stadium is named after Gaetano Bonolis, a medical doctor of the club as a posthumous honour.
