= Filippo Moscati =

Italian footballer

Personal information
- Date of birth: 19 September 1992 (age 34)
- Place of birth: Livorno, Italy
- Height: 1.81 m (5 ft 11 in)
- Position: Forward

Team information
- Current team: Pro Livorno Sorgenti

Youth career
- 2010–2012: Livorno

Senior career*
Years	Team	Apps	(Gls)
2010–2012	Livorno	0	(0)
2012–2013	Gavorrano	19	(1)
2013–2015	Pro Patria	22	(0)
2015	Fortis Juventus	17	(5)
2015–2018	Gavorrano	95	(23)
2018–2019	Aglianese	21	(7)
2019–2022	Grosseto	83	(22)
2022–	Pro Livorno Sorgenti	0	(0)
- * Club domestic league appearances and goals as of 23 April 2022

Filippo Moscati (born 19 September 1992) is an Italian footballer who plays as a forward for Pro Livorno Sorgenti.

== Club career ==
He played his first game for Livorno on 1 December 2010 in a Coppa Italia game against Bari.

He made his Serie C debut for Pro Patria on 1 September 2013 in a game against Cremonese.

In June 2019, Moscati joined Grosseto.
