= Sebastiano Finardi =

Italian footballer

Personal information
- Date of birth: 20 February 2001 (age 25)
- Place of birth: Milan, Italy
- Height: 1.77 m (5 ft 10 in)
- Position: Midfielder

Team information
- Current team: Ponte San Pietro

Youth career
- Atalanta

Senior career*
Years	Team	Apps	(Gls)
2020–2023	Atalanta	0	(0)
2021	→ Giana Erminio (loan)	19	(1)
2021–2023	→ Turris (loan)	34	(0)
2023–	Ponte San Pietro	2	(0)

International career^{‡}
2016	Italy U-15	9	(0)
2016–2017	Italy U-16	12	(0)
- * Club domestic league appearances and goals as of 2 May 2021 ‡ National team caps and goals as of 20 December 2023

Sebastiano Finardi (born 20 February 2001) is an Italian professional footballer who plays as a midfielder for Serie D club Ponte San Pietro.

== Club career ==
Born in Milan, Finardi started his career in the Atalanta youth system. On 9 September 2020, he was loaned to Serie C club Giana Erminio.

On 26 August 2021, he was loaned to Turris in Serie C.

Finardi rejoined Turris on another season-long loan on 15 July 2022.

== International career ==
Finardi was youth international for Italy on U-15 and U-16 teams between 2016 and 2017.
