= US Sambenedettese =

Italian football club

Sambenedettese
- Full name: Unione Sportiva; Sambenedettese S.r.l.
- Nickname: Samb
- Founded: 1923; 103 years ago 1994; 32 years ago (refounded as Sambenedettese Calcio); 2006; 20 years ago (refounded); 2009; 17 years ago (refounded); 2013; 13 years ago (refounded); 2021; 5 years ago (refounded); 2023; 3 years ago (refounded)
- Ground: Stadio Riviera delle Palme, San Benedetto del Tronto
- Capacity: 13,708
- Chairman: Vittorio Massi
- Manager: Roberto Boscaglia
- League: Serie C Group B
- 2025–26: Serie C Group B, 16th of 20
- Website: https://www.ussambenedettese.it/
Home colours	Away colours	Third colours

U.S. Sambenedettese S.r.l. is an Italian association football club, based in San Benedetto del Tronto, Marche. Sambenedettese currently plays in Serie C Group B.

== History ==
=== Foundation ===
The original club was founded in 1923 as U.S. Sambenedettese.

In 1956, the club was first promoted to Serie B, a division where they spent a total of 21 seasons (the last time of which was in 1989). In the 1980s, they also had a young Walter Zenga as a goalkeeper in their stint in the Italian second division.

In 1994, the club went bankrupt and was successively forced to restart from Eccellenza. In 2000, the club was acquired by Luciano Gaucci and eventually won promotion back to professionalism in 2001 and then to Serie C1 just a year later.

In 2009, the club was forced to restart again from Eccellenza, this time as U.S. Sambenedettese 1923.

In 2012–13 season, Sambenedettese won Group F of Serie D, but it was not promoted to Lega Pro Seconda Divisione as it was excluded by Federal Council's decision for incomplete documentation of submission to the league. The company behind the club also changed the name to U.S. Sambenedettese 1923 S.r.l. at that time. Refounded as A.S.D. Sambenedettese Calcio, the club restarted from Eccellenza Marche and promptly won promotion to Serie D. On 4 August 2015, Franco Fedeli acquired the then-Serie D club, and in 2016 Sambenedettese were promoted back to Lega Pro as the Group F winner of 2015–16 Serie D. The club was known as S.S.D. Sambenedettese ARL at that time. At the start of 2016–17 season the company behind the club changed the name to S.S. Sambenedettese S.r.l. (P.IVA 02177180441), but marketing as S.S. Sambenedettese Calcio. In 2020, the club was sold by Franco Fedeli to Italian-Argentine entrepreneur and Bangor City F.C. owner Domenico Serafino. However, less than a year later, after Serafino failed to comply with several financial requirements, the club was declared bankrupt.

The club's naming rights were then acquired by entrepreneur Roberto Renzi and was refounded as A.S. Sambenedettese. After repaying all debts, the newly reformed club was formally accepted by the Italian Football Federation, this way maintaining their spot in the Serie C league. The club was however excluded from Serie C due to financial irregularities and successively admitted to Serie D following a successful appeal and the payment of a league membership fee.

In 2023, Sambenedettese were also excluded from Serie D, and the club's naming rights were assigned to fellow Serie D club Porto d'Ascoli, who restarted under the new denomination of U.S. Sambenedettese. In 2025, the club was promoted back to Serie C.

== Success ==
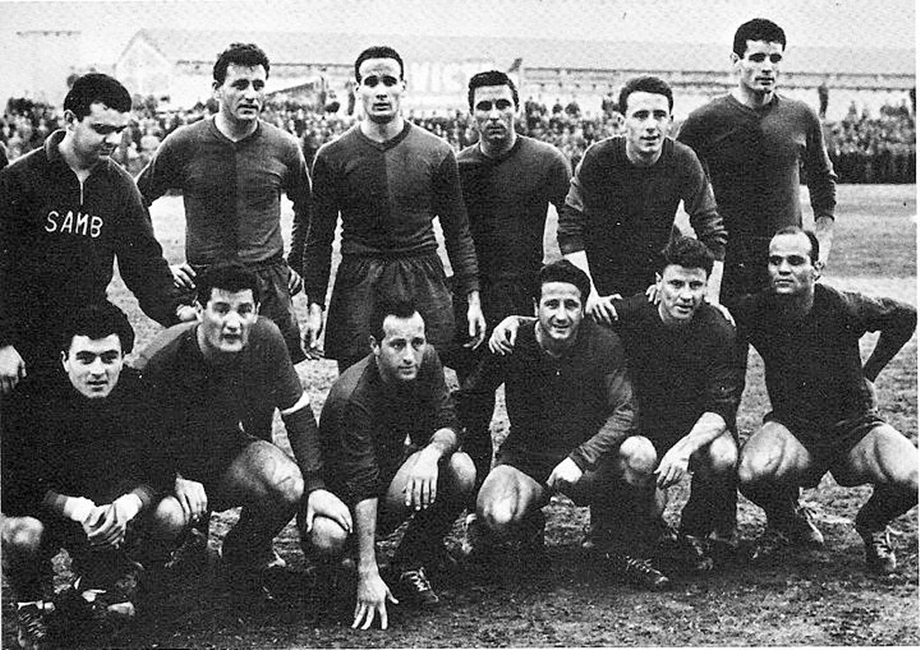
The formation of the Società Sportiva Sambenedettese 1955-1956, which achieved the first "historic" promotion to Serie B.

Despite coming from a small town of about 50,000 inhabitants, Sambenedettese has achieved results far exceeding expectations. By the late 1940s, Sambenedettese had come close to promotion to Serie B several times. From 1955, they played 21 seasons in 1956–57 Serie B, the only football team on the Adriatic coast to compete in such a major championship, the only one from Venice to Bari. At the regional level in those years, Sambenedettese was known as the Queen of the Marche, as the other Marche football teams were competing in lower leagues, Ascoli was playing local championships, and Ancona was in Serie C.

During those years, Sambenedettese challenged teams like Juventus, Napoli, and Bologna in the Coppa Italia. They were the first team from the Marche to host Juventus in a match 1960–61 Coppa Italia that drew the attention of thousands of fans to the small, old Fratelli Ballarin Stadium.

== Players ==
=== First team squad ===
As of 30 August 2026

Note: Flags indicate national team as defined under FIFA eligibility rules; some limited exceptions apply. Players may hold more than one non-FIFA nationality.

No.	Pos.	Nation	Player
1	GK	ITA	Giovanni Cultraro
4	DF	ITA	Alessio Zini
5	DF	ITA	Mirko Chelli
6	MF	ITA	Marco Piccoli
7	FW	ITA	Alessandro Faggioli
8	MF	EST	Georgi Tunjov
9	FW	ITA	Lorenzo Sgarbi (on loan from Napoli)
10	FW	ITA	Pasquale Marranzino
11	FW	ITA	Davide Pio Stabile (on loan from Virtus Entella)
12	GK	LTU	Titas Krapikas
14	MF	ITA	Elia Plicco (on loan from Parma)
15	DF	ITA	Nicolò Gigli
17	DF	ITA	Leonardo Pezzola
18	MF	ITA	Kevin Candellori
19	FW	ITA	Mauro Semprini

No.	Pos.	Nation	Player
21	MF	ITA	Francesco Perrotta
22	GK	ITA	Tommaso Orsini
27	FW	ITA	Gabriele Gigante
28	FW	GEQ	José Machín
29	DF	ITA	Agostino Camigliano
30	MF	ITA	Simone Nicoli
37	MF	GUI	Moussa Touré
38	MF	SUI	Leo Buljan
47	FW	ESP	Amadou Konate
81	GK	ITA	Alberto Barraco
90	DF	ITA	Simone Kosijer
97	MF	ITA	Alessandro Maspero
—	MF	ITA	Mathias Margarita
—	FW	ITA	Nazareno Battista

=== Out on loan ===
Note: Flags indicate national team as defined under FIFA eligibility rules; some limited exceptions apply. Players may hold more than one non-FIFA nationality.

No.	Pos.	Nation	Player
—	GK	ITA	Matteo Grillo (at Maceratese until 30 June 2027)
—	GK	ITA	Edoardo Zagaglia (at Atletico Ascoli until 30 June 2027)
—	DF	ITA	Federico Chiatante (at Virtus Francavilla until 30 June 2027)

No.	Pos.	Nation	Player
—	MF	ITA	Marco Biagiotti (at Virtus Francavilla until 30 June 2027)
—	MF	ITA	Riccardo Bongelli (at Triestina until 30 June 2027)
—	FW	GUI	Nouhan Touré (at Teramo until 30 June 2027)

== Colors and badge ==
Sambenedettese fans about to invade the pitch in Ascoli during the 1970 derby.

The team's colors are red and blue.

== Rivalries ==
The main rivalry is with Ascoli. They are in the same province – Province of Ascoli Piceno.

== Honours ==
- Coppa Italia Serie C
  - Winners: 1991–92
