= Vito Leonetti =

Italian footballer

Personal information
- Date of birth: 16 March 1994 (age 32)
- Place of birth: Bari, Italy
- Height: 1.79 m (5 ft 10 in)
- Position: Forward

Team information
- Current team: Casarano
- Number: 46

Youth career
- Fidelis Andria
- 2011–2013: Bari

Senior career*
Years	Team	Apps	(Gls)
2012–2016	Bari	2	(0)
2012–2013	→ Agnonese (loan)	32	(9)
2015	→ Savoia (loan)	13	(0)
2015–2016	→ Akragas (loan)	24	(2)
2016–2017	Lumezzane	12	(1)
2017	→ Reggina (loan)	15	(2)
2017–2019	Vastese	63	(37)
2019–2021	Matelica	60	(27)
2021–2023	Turris	63	(24)
2023–2025	Cerignola	27	(2)
2024–2025	→ Team Altamura (loan)	26	(12)
2025–2026	Campobasso	17	(5)
2026–	Casarano	14	(3)
- * Club domestic league appearances and goals as of 1 May 2026

Vito Leonetti (born 16 March 1994) is an Italian professional footballer who plays as a forward for Serie C Group C club Casarano.

== Club career ==
Leonetti finished his youth formation at Bari, and was subsequently loaned to lowly Olympia Agnonese. After scoring nine goals with the side in Serie D, he returned to Biancorossi and made his professional debut on 8 September coming on as a second-half substitute in a 2–3 loss at Siena.

On 29 June 2021, he signed a two-year contract with Turris.
