= US Fiorenzuola 1922 SS =

Italian football club

Fiorenzuola
- Full name: Unione Sportiva Fiorenzuola 1922
- Nicknames: Rossoneri (Red and Blacks)
- Founded: 1922
- Ground: Stadio Comunale, Fiorenzuola d'Arda, Italy
- Capacity: 4,000
- Chairman: Luigi Pinalli
- Manager: Vincenzo Cammaroto
- League: Serie D
- 2023–24: Serie C Group A, 18th of 20 (relegated)
Home colours	Away colours

Unione Sportiva Fiorenzuola 1922 Società Sportiva is an Italian association football club from Fiorenzuola d'Arda, province of Piacenza, Emilia-Romagna. The club currently plays in Serie D.

== History ==
In its history, Fiorenzuola mostly played in amateur and lower professional leagues, except for a brief stint in the 1990s when the club reached Serie C1 and narrowly missed promotion to Serie B, after losing the 1995 promotion playoff final to Pistoiese on penalty shoot-outs. Also in 1995, Fiorenzuola made a great exploit in the Coppa Italia, being defeated 2–1 at home by Inter after having previously eliminated Brescia and Torino. In the following years, Fiorenzuola started a slow decline which brought the club down to the Eccellenza. The club currently plays in Serie D.

== Colors and badge ==
The team's colors are red and black.

== Stadium ==
Fiorenzuola play their home matches at the Stadio Comunale, also known as Velodrome Attilio Pavesi.

== Current squad ==
As of 9 October 2024

Note: Flags indicate national team as defined under FIFA eligibility rules; some limited exceptions apply. Players may hold more than one non-FIFA nationality.

No.	Pos.	Nation	Player
1	GK	ITA	Vittorio Gilli
3	DF	ITA	Edoardo Ghibaudo
4	DF	ITA	Sebastiano Finardi
5	DF	ITA	Matteo Ronchi
7	FW	ITA	Matteo Oboe
8	MF	ITA	Gian Piero Lauciello
9	FW	ITA	Matteo Gozzerini
10	MF	ITA	Niccolo Sette
11	FW	ALB	Olger Merkaj
16	MF	ITA	Jacopo Mosole
17	MF	ITA	Lorenzo Gavioli
18	MF	ITA	Cristian Lori
19	MF	ITA	Matteo Sementa

No.	Pos.	Nation	Player
20	FW	ITA	Gianluca Concari
21	MF	ITA	Salvatore Tringali
22	GK	ITA	Filippo Ansaldi
23	DF	ITA	Loris Fontana
26	MF	ITA	Michele Postiglioni
30	MF	ITA	Giordano Trovade
32	DF	ROU	Alex Bran
33	DF	ITA	Gabriele De Simone
37	DF	SVK	Filip Nagy
70	MF	ITA	Diego Binelli
80	MF	ITA	Orso Maria De Ponti
81	DF	ITA	Lorenzo Niccolai
96	MF	ITA	Alessandro Valenti (on loan from Novara Primavera)

== Notable former managers ==
- (Italy) Alberto Cavasin
- (Italy) Massimo Ficcadenti
- (Italy) Stefano Pioli

== Honours ==
Eccellenza Emilia-Romagna

- Winners: 2007–2008, 2013–2014 (Group A)
