= Federico Viero =

Italian footballer

Personal information
- Date of birth: 10 March 1999 (age 27)
- Place of birth: Parma, Italy
- Height: 1.80 m (5 ft 11 in)
- Position: Midfielder

Team information
- Current team: Giulianova

Youth career
- –2015: Parma
- 2015–2019: Sassuolo

Senior career*
Years	Team	Apps	(Gls)
2019–2022	Teramo	50	(2)
2022–2025	Legnago	55	(1)
2025	Treviso	16	(0)
2025–2026	Pineto	14	(0)
2026–	Giulianova	0	(0)
- * Club domestic league appearances and goals as of 30 April 2026

Federico Viero (born 10 March 1999) is an Italian professional footballer who plays as a midfielder for Serie D club Giulianova.

== Career ==
Born in Parma, Viero started his career in local club Parma youth sector. In 2015 he joined to Sassuolo Primavera.

On 5 July 2019, he signed with Serie C club Teramo. Viero made his professional debut on 25 August 2019 against Catanzaro.
