= Alessandro Sangiorgi =

Italian footballer (born 1999)

Personal information
- Date of birth: 12 November 1999 (age 27)
- Place of birth: Melzo, Italy
- Height: 1.72 m (5 ft 8 in)
- Position: Midfielder

Team information
- Current team: Real Calepina
- Number: 5

Youth career
- Pro Vercelli

Senior career*
Years	Team	Apps	(Gls)
2018–2022	Pro Vercelli	25	(0)
2021	→ Chieri (loan)	15	(0)
2022	Fermana	6	(0)
2022–2023	Pinerolo	32	(0)
2023–	Real Calepina	19	(0)
- * Club domestic league appearances and goals as of 20 December 2023

Alessandro Sangiorgi (born 12 November 1999) is an Italian professional footballer who plays as a midfielder for Serie D club Rovatovertovese.

== Club career ==
Formed in Pro Vercelli youth system, Sangiorgi made his first debut team for Serie C on 6 October 2018 against Carrarese. He missed the next season because an injury.

On 20 February 2021, he joined Serie D club Chieri, on loan for the rest of the season.

On 31 January 2022, he signed a contract until 30 June 2024 with Fermana.
