= Stadio Ettore Mannucci =

Football stadium in Pisa province, Italy

Coordinates: 43°40′09″N 10°38′39″E

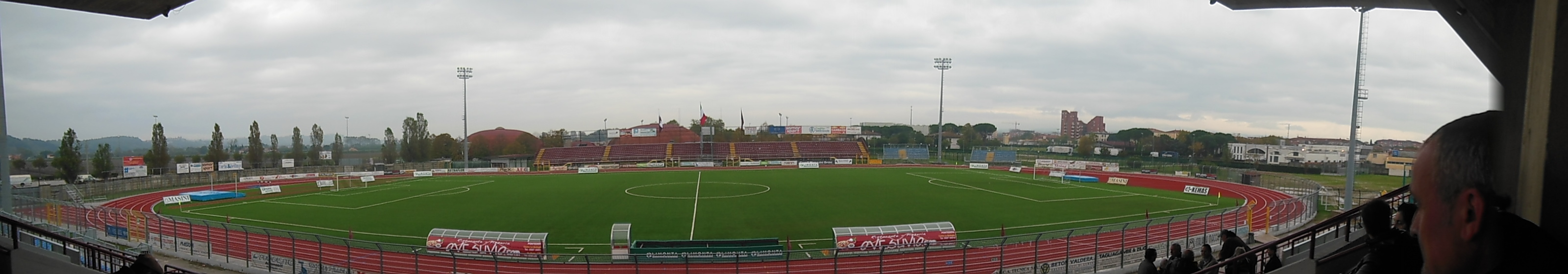
- Interactive map of Stadio Ettore Mannucci
- Location: Pontedera, Italy
- Capacity: 5,014

Tenant
- U.S. Pontedera 1912

Stadio Ettore Mannucci is an arena in Pontedera, Italy. It is primarily used for football, and is the home to Serie D club Pontedera. The stadium holds 5,014 spectators.

During the 2022–23 Serie C season, the stadium is also serving as the home venue of Monterosi.
