= Calcio Padova =

Italian football club

Padova
- Full name: Calcio Padova SpA
- Nicknames: I Biancoscudati (The White-Shielded); The Patavini (The Patavins)
- Founded: 29 January 1910; 116 years ago as ACP; 2014; 12 years ago, as SSDB Padova then Calcio Padova
- Stadium: Stadio Comunale Euganeo
- Capacity: 32,420
- Owner(s): Acciaierie Venete S.p.A. (68,25%); Francesco Peghin (25%); HGB s.r.l. (3,75%); Luca Destro (2,25%); Giampaolo Salot (0,75%)
- President: Francesco Peghin
- Head coach: Antonio Calabro
- League: Serie B
- 2025–26: Serie B, 10th of 20
- Website: padovacalcio.it
Home colours	Away colours

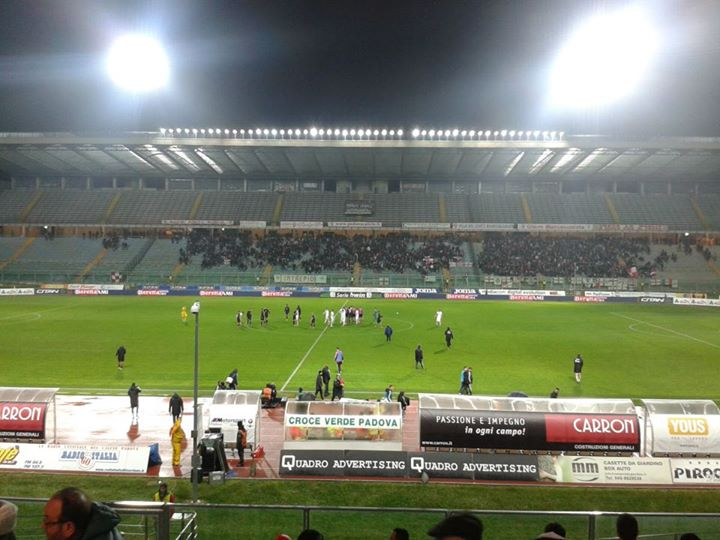
Calcio Padova Stadium Stadio Euganeo

Calcio Padova, commonly referred to as Padova, is an Italian football club based in Padua, Veneto. Founded in 1910, Padova currently play in Serie B, having last been in Serie A in 1996. The team's official colours are white and red.

The team was refounded in 2014 after the sports title was awarded to Biancoscudati Padova for the 2014–15 Serie D season as a phoenix club. The old holder of the title was in the process of liquidation after it was expelled from 2014–15 Lega Pro. The original Padova was renamed Football Padova in order to allow the new iteration of Padova to use the original name of the club, Calcio Padova in 2015.

== History ==
In the 1940s, the team was coached by Béla Guttmann. Padova's golden days were the late 1950s, when the team managed by Nereo Rocco, reached the heights of third place in 1958 thanks to the wing wizardry of Kurt Hamrin. Forwards Sergio Brighenti and Aurelio Milani would star as Padova remained a force in Serie A, before relegation in 1962. The rest of the 1960s would see the club in Serie B before going into a serious decline ahead of a 1980s revival.

The revival would see Padova return to Serie B in the early 1980s, and within a decade they would be serious promotion contenders. A play-off win over Cesena in 1994 saw the club return to Serie A after 32 years. After a dire start to the 1994–95 season, Padova looked like fulfilling most experts' predictions of a swift return to Serie B. They nonetheless found their form in the second half of the year and when they recorded a 1–0 win away to Juventus, they were six points clear of the drop zone. However, they eventually ended up contesting the relegation play-off against Genoa, due to a late Inter Milan goal assisted by a Rubén Sosa corner, which they won on penalties.

There would be no such luck the following year, as Padova were relegated, with further relegations in 1998 and 1999. Since 2001, they have resided in Serie C1 and Lega Pro Prima Divisione. The team returned in Serie B at the end of the 2008–2009 season.

In total, Calcio Padova participated in 11 Prima Divisione/Divisione Nazionale championships between 1914–15 and 1928–29 (best place being 3rd in 1922–23) and 16 Serie A championships between 1929–30 and 1995–96 (best place being 3rd in 1957–58); in Coppa Italia, the best place was runner-up in 1967. Padova won a Coppa Italia Serie C in 1980, and played also 34 Serie B championships (won in 1947–48) and 29 Serie C1/C2/Lega Pro Prima Divisione championships (won in 1936–37, 1980–81 and 2000–01). Padova finished runner-up the Anglo-Italian Cup of 1983.

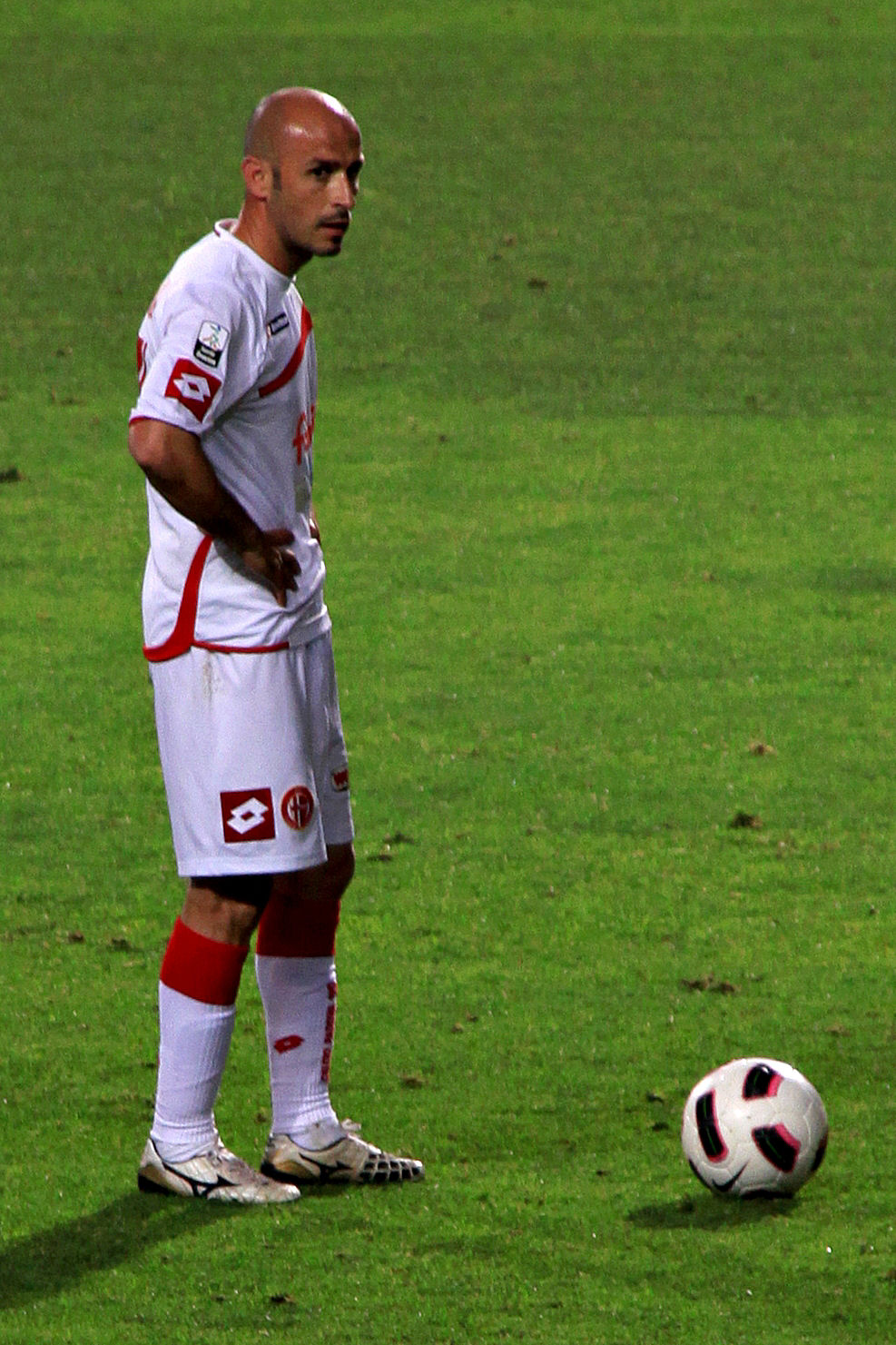
Vincenzo Italiano, former captain of Padova.

In the 2013–14 Serie B season, Padova were relegated after finishing 20th, and on 15 July 2014, the team did not sign up to the 2014–15 Lega Pro championship. In April 2015, the company was put into liquidation.

=== Biancoscudati Padova ===
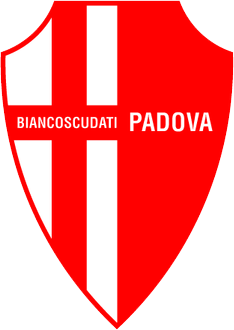
The logo used in the 2014–15 season.

The club was founded in the summer of 2014, with the name Società Sportiva Dilettantistica a r.l. Biancoscudati Padova, after the non-inclusion of Calcio Padova in Lega Pro and Serie D.

The first official match was Biancoscudati Padova-Castellana (2–0), valid for the Coppa Italia Serie D, played 24 August 2014.

On 19 April 2015, by virtue of a 2–1 away victory against Legnago, the team secured promotion to Lega Pro.

On 5 June 2015, changed its name to Biancoscudati Padova Spa.

On 6 July 2015, changed its name to Calcio Padova Spa, after the old Calcio Padova changed its name to Football Padova Spa – società in liquidazione.

== Recent seasons ==
Season	Division	Tier	Pos	Pl	W	D	L	+	-	P	Cup	Note
2016–17	Lega Pro (Group B)	III	4	38	19	9	10	50	31	66	1st round	Eliminated in the Promotion play-offs 1/16-finals to AlbinoLeffe
2017–18	Serie C (Group B)	III	↑ 1	34	17	12	5	44	27	63	2nd round	Promoted to Serie B
2018–19	Serie B	II	↓ 18	36	5	16	15	36	49	31	3rd round	Relegated to Serie C
2019–20	Serie C (Group B)	III	5	26	13	5	8	35	19	44	2nd round	Eliminated in the Promotion play-offs 1/8-finals to Juventus U23
2020–21	Serie C (Group B)	III	2	38	24	7	7	68	26	79	3rd round	Lost the Promotion play-offs final to Alessandria
2021–22	Serie C (Group A)	III	2	38	25	10	3	60	26	85	Prelim. round	Lost the Promotion play-offs final to Palermo
2022–23	Serie C (Group A)	III	5	38	15	14	9	47	40	59	Prelim. round	Eliminated in the Promotion play-offs 1/16-finals to Virtus Verona
2023–24	Serie C (Group A)	III	2	38	21	14	3	55	28	77	–	Eliminated in the Promotion play-offs quarterfinals to Vicenza
2024–25	Serie C (Group A)	III	↑ 1	38	26	8	4	65	24	86	Prelim. round	Promoted to Serie B
2025–26	Serie B	II	10	38	12	10	16	39	49	46	Prelim. round	

== Players ==
=== First team squad ===
As of 8 September 2026

Note: Flags indicate national team as defined under FIFA eligibility rules; some limited exceptions apply. Players may hold more than one non-FIFA nationality.

No.	Pos.	Nation	Player
1	GK	POR	Louis Mouquet
3	DF	ITA	Antonio Barreca
5	DF	ITA	Matteo Lovato
6	MF	ITA	Giovanni Giunti
7	MF	ECU	Kevin Varas (vice-captain)
8	MF	ITA	Pietro Fusi
9	FW	ITA	Luca Moro
10	FW	ITA	Gianluca Caprari
11	FW	ITA	Alessandro Seghetti
12	GK	ITA	Simone Scaglia
14	MF	ITA	Marco Pompetti
15	FW	ITA	Kevin Lasagna
17	MF	ITA	Alessandro Capelli
18	DF	ITA	Enrico Silletti
20	FW	ITA	Mattia Bortolussi

No.	Pos.	Nation	Player
21	MF	ITA	Emanuele Zuelli
22	GK	ITA	Alessandro Sorrentino
23	MF	ITA	Francesco Di Mariano
24	DF	ITA	Lorenzo Carissoni
25	MF	ITA	Nicolas Galazzi (on loan from Monza)
27	DF	ITA	Alessandro Dellavalle (on loan from Torino)
32	DF	ITA	Filippo Sgarbi
34	DF	ITA	Matteo Cocchi (on loan from Inter Milan)
58	DF	ITA	Christian Pastina
72	DF	ITA	Carlo Faedo
74	MF	ITA	Diego Marcolini
90	FW	ITA	Gabriele Artistico
92	FW	ITA	Cristian Buonaiuto
98	MF	ITA	Luca Zanimacchia

=== Out on loan ===
Note: Flags indicate national team as defined under FIFA eligibility rules; some limited exceptions apply. Players may hold more than one non-FIFA nationality.

No.	Pos.	Nation	Player
—	GK	ITA	Pablo Mangiaracina-Lopez (at Lavarian Mortean Esperia until 30 June 2027)
—	DF	ITA	Andrea Antonello (at Luparense until 30 June 2027)
—	DF	ITA	Tommaso Bordoni (at Lecco until 30 June 2027)

No.	Pos.	Nation	Player
—	MF	ITA	Luigi Castegnaro (at Arzignano Valchiampo until 30 June 2027)
—	MF	ITA	Mattia Penta (at Arzignano Valchiampo until 30 June 2027)
—	MF	ITA	Francesco Tumiatti (at Mestre until 30 June 2027)

== Coaching staff ==
As of 28 August 2026

Position	Name
Head coach	(Italy) Antonio Calabro
Assistant coach	(Italy) Vincenzo Melidona
Goalkeeping coach	(Italy) Adriano Zancopè
Match analyst	(Italy) Salvatore De Mauro
Athletic trainers	(Italy) Donatello Matarangolo (Italy) Francesco Delmorgine (Italy) Matteo Zambello
Team manager	(Italy) Rudy Ravaioli (Italy) Andrea Bonfanti
Accompanying manager	(Italy) Rosario Ferrigno
Head of Medicine	(Italy) Dr. Luigi Munari
Doctor	(Italy) Dr. Alberto Rigon (Italy) Dr. Renzo Scaggiante
Physiotherapists	(Italy) Felice Zuin (Italy) Paolo Garolla (Italy) Marco Giulio Cosaro (Italy) Francesco De Checchi
Nutritionist	(Italy) Diego Campaci
Orthopedic consultant	(Italy) Giorgio Franceschi

== Honours ==
- Serie B
  - Winners: 1947–48 (group B)
- Serie C
  - Winners: 1936–37 (group C), 2017–18 (group B), 2024-25 (group A)
- Serie C2
  - Winners: 1980–81 (group B), 2000–01 (group A)
- Serie D
  - Winners: 2014–15 (group C)
- Coppa Italia Serie C
  - Winners: 1979–80, 2021–22
- Supercoppa di Serie C
  - Winners: 2018

== Divisional movements ==
Series	Years	Last	Promotions	Relegations
A	16	1995–96	–	▼5 (1930, 1934, 1952, 1962, 1996)
B	38	2018–19	▲4 (1932, 1948, 1955, 1994)	▼6 (1935, 1969, 1985, 1998, 2014✟, 2019, 2019)
C +C2	34 +4	2024–25	▲5 (1937, 1983, 1987, 2009, 2018) ▲2 (1981 C2, 2001 C2)	▼2 (1979 C1, 1999 C1)
92 out of 93 years of professional football in Italy since 1929
Founding member of the Football League’s First Division in 1921
D	1	2014–15	▲1 (2015)	never
