= SS Matelica Calcio 1921 =

Italian football club

Matelica
- Full name: Societa Sportiva Matelica Calcio 1921 SrL
- Nicknames: Biancorossi (White and reds)
- Founded: 1921; 104 years ago 2021; 4 years ago (refounded)
- Ground: Giovanni Paolo II
- Capacity: 1200
- Chairman: Sabrina Orlandi
- Manager: Lorenzo Ciattaglia
- League: Promozione Marche (Group B)
- 2022–23: Promozione Marche B, 5th
- Website: http://www.ssmatelicacalcio.com/
Home colours	Away colours	Third colours

Società Sportiva Matelica Calcio 1921, commonly referred to as Matelica, is an Italian football club founded in 1921 and based in Matelica, Marche. Currently, it plays in Italy's Promozione.

== History ==
=== Foundation ===
The club was founded in 1921.

=== Serie D ===
In the season 2012–13, the team was promoted for the first time, from Eccellenza Marche to Serie D.

In the 2019–20 season, Matelica was promoted to Serie C for the first time in the club's history.

=== Serie C, merger with Anconitana and restart from amateur leagues ===
In June 2021, Matelica owner Mauro Canil and Anconitana announced their intention to merge the two clubs. The resulting entity was named "Ancona-Matelica" and was based in the city of Ancona, with the aim to have its name changed to "Ancona" by 2022, pending approval by the Italian Football Federation.

In July 2021, the merger finally took place; as part of the process, all logos and naming rights of Matelica were given away to Prima Categoria club G.S. Corrado Fabiani Matelica, chaired by Sabrina Orlandi, Mauro Canil's wife.

== Colors and badge ==
The team's colours are white and red.

== Presidential history ==
- ... (1921-1937)
- Riccardo Acqualagna (1937-1939)
- ... (1939-1944)
- Inactive (1944-1946)
- Achille Roversi (1946-1948)
- Inactive (1948-1950)
- Isidoro Belluco (1950-1952)
- Mellito Papi (1952-1953)
- Galliano Boldrini (1953-1957)
- ... (1957-1960)
- Giuseppe Ottalina (1960-1961)
- Emilio Acqualagna (1961-1963)
- Giuseppe Baldini (1963-1967)
- ... (1967-1970)
- Emilio Acqualagna (1970-1972)
- Giuseppe Baldini (1972-1973)
- Emilio Acqualagna (1973-1976)
- Renato Brancaleoni (1976-1980)
- Giuseppe Vico (1980-1981)
- Pietro Mataloni (1981-1982)
- Oreste Cesari (1982-1988)
- Gino Marcella (1988-1990)
- Pietro Lucernoni (1990-1995)
- Ezio Scalamonti (1995-1997)
- Silvano Passero (1997-2010)
- Mauro Canil (2010-)

== Honours ==
- Serie D: 1

2019-20

- Coppa Italia Serie D: 1

2018-19

- Eccellenza: 1

2012-13

- Promozione: 1

2011-12

- Prima Categoria: 4

1970-71, 1972-73, 1989-90, 2010-11

- Seconda Categoria: 1

1983-84

- Coppa Italia Promozione Marche: 1

2011-12
