= SSC Ancona ASD =

Italian football club

Ancona
- Full name: Società Sportiva Calcistica Ancona; Associazione Sportiva Dilettantistica
- Nicknames: I Dorici (The Dorians); I Biancorossi (The Red and Whites)
- Founded: 2021
- Ground: Stadio del Conero, Ancona, Italy
- Capacity: 23,967
- Chairman: Vincenzo Guerini
- Manager: Massimo Gadda
- League: Serie D
- 2024–25: Serie D Group F, 6th of 18
- Website: https://www.usancona.com/
Home colours	Away colours	Third colours

Società Sportiva Calcistica Ancona, commonly referred to as Ancona, is an Italian football club based in Ancona, Marche, currently playing in Serie D.

The club is the heir of the defunct former Serie A club Ancona, with whom it shares its official historical logo. The history of football in Ancona dates back to 1905, when the original club was founded.

== History ==
Ancona has a long history of football clubs sharing the same red and white colours and a similar logo. Originally, the club was named Anconitana, but its name was changed in the 1980s to reflect the city of Ancona. Reaching the final of the 1994 Coppa Italia and spending two seasons in the Serie A, eleven years apart, the original club was refounded after a 2004 relegation from the top flight in last place. This came after the club had loaded up on experienced players of high profile, such as Mário Jardel, Dario Hübner and Eusebio Di Francesco, without success. Six years later, the club was refounded again, demoting it from the second to the fourth tier. In 2017, a third bankruptcy led to the refounded club dropping out of the professional leagues.

The most recent club was founded in 2021 as the merger of Serie C club S.S. Matelica Calcio 1921, from the city of Matelica, with Ancona-based Eccellenza club Anconitana.

As part of the merger, all logos and naming rights of Matelica were given away to Prima Categoria club G.S. Corrado Fabiani Matelica, formally owned by chairman Mauro Canil's wife and which is now to be legally considered the heir of Matelica itself, whereas, as part of the merger, Anconitana brought the original footballing logo, as well as the rights to use the Stadio del Conero in the city of Ancona. The new club's board will be the same as Matelica's, with Mauro Canil as majority shareholder and chairman, whereas Anconitana's original owner Stefano Marconi will be linked to Ancona-Matelica as the club's official main sponsor for the following five years. The club board stated their aim to have the official name changed to just "Ancona" by 2022, pending approval by the Italian Football Federation.

On 30 March 2022, Malaysian billionaire entrepreneur Tony Tiong, nephew of Tiong Hiew King, was announced as the new majority shareholder, after having acquired 95% of the club's shares. By the end of the season, the club changed its denomination to Unione Sportiva Ancona, thus severing its association with Matelica altogether. After two seasons, the club was excluded again from Serie C after the ownership failed to comply with the financial and legal requirements in time and then restarted from Serie D with the denomination of SSC Ancona ASD by means of Article 52 of NOIF.

== Colors and badge ==
The team's colors are white and red.

== Stadium ==
Ancona play their home matches at the 25,000-capacity Stadio del Conero, located in the city of Ancona.
