= 2019–20 SSD Palermo season =

Palermo
2019–20 season
- President: Dario Mirri
- Manager: Rosario Pergolizzi
- Stadium: Renzo Barbera
- Serie D/I: Winners (promoted to Serie C)
- Coppa Italia Serie D: Preliminary round
- Top goalscorer: League: Giovanni Ricciardo (9); All: Giovanni Ricciardo (9)
- Highest home attendance: 19,726 vs Licata (20 October 2019, Serie D)
- Lowest home attendance: 2,800 vs Biancavilla (11 September 2019, Coppa Italia Serie D)
- Average home league attendance: 15,936
Home colours	Away colours	Third colours
- All statistics correct as of 19 June 2020.

The 2019–20 season was Società Sportiva Dilettantistica Palermo's 1st season in Serie D, the fourth-highest division of Italian football, in their history, after the exclusion of the club from Serie B in summer 2019. However, this was the second time that Palermo participated in the fourth division: in the 1987–88 season the sicilian club played in Serie C2, after a year passed outside of any football league, because of bankruptcy in 1986.

== Season review ==
Following Palermo's exclusion from Serie B, a phoenix club was established under the Article 52 of N.O.I.F. regulations, with Mayor of Palermo Leoluca Orlando responsible to choose the next ownership. On 24 July 2019, Mayor Orlando confirmed six declarations of interests had been presented on that regard; those included offers by Massimo Ferrero (Sampdoria owner and chairman), Lebanese-Swiss-English fund Zurich Capital Funds, fashion multinational company Capri srl, and a joint one by Dario Mirri (Palermo-based marketing entrepreneur, and nephew of historical club chairman Renzo Barbera) and Tony DiPiazza (Sicilian-American real estate mogul).

The next day, Orlando announced to have chosen "Hera Hora srl", the joint Mirri-DiPiazza proposal, as the new owners.

Under the new conditions, Hera Hora srl will control 90% of the new club, with a 10% to be specifically dedicated for a supporters' trust as specifically requested by the City of Palermo. Regarding Hera Hora srl (the controlling company of the new club), Mirri will personally control 10% of it, Damir srl (Mirri's main business company) 50%, and DiPiazza 40%. The new owners will also be supported by Rinaldo Sagramola, former Palermo managing director during the early Zamparini years (2004–2012), who will serve again in such role. As stated in their business plan, the new ownership plans to bring Palermo back to Serie A within three years, organize a women's football section (by means of acquisition and integration of an already existing local team), relaunch the youth system also through a collaboration with the minor local teams, open a club museum and build a new training centre nearby the stadium area.

On 3 August 2019, as part of the inaugural press conference, the club announced the new managerial staff, featuring Renzo Castagnini (former Sagramola collaborator) as sporting director and Rosario Pergolizzi (former Palermo youth coach) as head coach; the youth sector will instead be managed by Rosario Argento (former Palermo youth chief in the 2000s) and Leandro Rinaudo (a Palermo native and former club player).

== Players ==
=== Squad information ===
Players and squad numbers last updated on 1 February 2020.
Appearances and goals are counted for domestic leagues (Serie A, Serie B and Serie D), national cups (Coppa Italia and Coppa Italia Serie D) and international cup (UEFA Cup) and correct as of 1 March 2020.
Note: Flags indicate national team as has been defined under FIFA eligibility rules. Players may hold more than one non-FIFA nationality.

No.	Name	Nat	Position(s)	Date of birth (age)	Signed in	Contract ends	Signed from	Transfer Fee	Apps.	Goals
Goalkeepers
1	Alberto Pelagotti	(Italy)	GK	9 March 1989 (age 37)	2019	2020	(Italy) Arezzo	Free	25	–16
12	Gabriele Corallo	(Italy)	GK	1 September 2001 (age 25)	2019	2020	(Italy) Trapani	Free	-	-
22	Mattia Fallani (Note: On loan.)	(Italy)	GK	31 March 2001 (age 25)	2019	2020	(Italy) SPAL	Free	4	–1
Defenders
3	Lorenzo Bechini	(Italy)	LB	19 June 2001 (age 25)	2019	2020	(Italy) Sassuolo	Free	-	-
4	Andrea Accardi	(Italy)	CB / RB / LB	30 July 1995 (age 31)	2019	2020	(Italy) Palermo (Note: Accardi played for Unione Sportiva Città di Palermo until the exclusion of the club from Serie B, then he was signed by the new phoenix club admitted to Serie D.)	Free	26	0
15	Bubacarr Marong	(Italy)	CB	10 January 2000 (age 26)	2019	2020	(Italy) Parmonval	Free	-	-
19	Edoardo Lancini	(Italy)	CB	10 April 1994 (age 32)	2019	2020	(Italy) Brescia	Free	24	2
23	Masimiliano Doda	(Albania)	RB	17 November 2000 (age 25)	2019	2020	(Italy) Sampdoria	Free	22	1
24	Roberto Crivello	(Italy)	LB / CB	14 September 1991 (age 35)	2019	2020	(Italy) Spezia	Free	23	0
27	Francesco Vaccaro	(Italy)	LB	1 April 1999 (age 27)	2019	2020	(Italy) Altamura	Free	21	0
54	Manuel Peretti	(Italy)	CB / RB	7 March 2000 (age 26)	2019	2020	(Italy) Hellas Verona	Free	15	1
Midfielders
5	Danilo Ambro	(Italy)	CM	16 January 1999 (age 27)	2019	2020	(Italy) Feralpisalò	Free	18	1
6	Alessandro Martinelli	(Switzerland)	CM	30 May 1993 (age 33)	2019	2020	(Italy) Brescia	Free	25	1
7	Gianmarco Corsino	(Italy)	RWB	20 July 1991 (age 35)	2019	2020	(Italy) Marsala	Free	1	0
8	Malaury Martin	(France)	CM	25 August 1988 (age 38)	2019	2020	(Scotland) Hearts	Free	24	1
10	Andrea Rizzo Pinna	(Italy)	CM / AM	13 January 2000 (age 26)	2019	2020	(Italy) Atalanta	Undisclosed	3	0
20	Luigi Mendola	(Italy)	CM	30 September 2000 (age 26)	2019	2020	(Italy) Vibonese	Free	-	-
26	Juan Mauri	(Argentina)	CM	29 December 1988 (age 37)	2019	2020	(Italy) Lucchese	Free	16	1
33	Christian Langella	(Italy)	CM	7 April 2000 (age 26)	2019	2020	(Italy) Pisa	Free	25	3
73	Erdis Kraja	(Italy)	CM	7 July 2000 (age 26)	2019	2020	(Italy) Atalanta	Free	21	3
Forwards
9	Giovanni Ricciardo	(Italy)	CF	17 December 1986 (age 39)	2019	2020	(Italy) Cesena	Free	20	9
11	Mario Santana (C)	(Argentina)	RW / LW / SS	23 December 1981 (age 44)	2019	2020	(Italy) Pro Patria	Free	119	9
17	Andrea Ferrante	(Italy)	RW	26 January 2001 (age 25)	2019	2020	(Italy) Savio	Free	1	0
21	Raimondo Lucera	(Italy)	SS	30 November 2000 (age 25)	2019	2020	(Italy) Youth Sector (Note: Lucera last played for Youth Sector of Unione Sportiva Città di Palermo before signing for S.S.D. Palermo.)	Free	8	1
75	Mattia Felici	(Italy)	SS / RW	17 April 2001 (age 25)	2019	2020	(Italy) Lecce	Free	25	4
Players transferred in during the season
14	Luca Ficarrotta	(Italy)	RW	30 August 1990 (age 36)	2019	2020	(Italy) Marsala	€35,000	17	2
32	Ferdinando Sforzini	(Italy)	CF	4 December 1984 (age 41)	2019	2020	(Italy) Cavese	Free	14	5
30	Andrea Silipo	(Italy)	RW	17 April 2001 (age 25)	2020	2020	(Italy) Roma	Free	9	2
25	Roberto Floriano	(Italy)	LW	14 August 1986 (age 40)	2020	2020	(Italy) Bari	Free	8	6
18	Lorenzo Lucca	(Italy)	CF	10 September 2000 (age 26)	2020	2020	(Italy) Torino	Undisclosed	3	1
42	Christian Cangemi (Note: Aggregated from Youth Sector during the season.)	(Italy)	DF	7 June 2002 (age 24)	2020	2020	(Italy) Youth Sector	N/A	-	-
72	Salvatore Florio	(Italy)	MF	28 October 2002 (age 23)	2020	2020	(Italy) Youth Sector	N/A	-	-

Name	Signed to	Transfer Fee	Notes
Players transferred out during the season
Lorenzo Bechini	(Italy) Sassuolo	Free	End of loan

== Transfers ==
=== Summer 2019 ===
==== Pre-dissolution ====
===== In =====
Date	Pos.	Player	Age	Moving from	Fee	Notes	Source
1 July 2019	DF	(Belgium) Corentin Fiore	24	(Italy) Imolese	Free	End of loan	
1 July 2019	MF	(France) Eddy Gnahoré	25	(France) Amiens	Free	End of loan	
1 July 2019	FW	(Hungary) Norbert Balogh	23	(Cyprus) APOEL	Free	End of loan	
1 July 2019	FW	(Guinea-Bissau) Carlos Embalo	24	(Italy) Cosenza	Free	End of loan	

===== Out =====
Date	Pos.	Player	Age	Moving to	Fee	Notes	Source
7 June 2019	GK	(Croatia) Josip Posavec	23	(Croatia) Hajduk Split	€400,000	Option to buy exercised	
30 June 2019	GK	(Italy) Fabrizio Alastra	21	(Italy) Parma	Free	Contract expiration	
30 June 2019	GK	(Italy) Alberto Pomini	38	(Italy) Venezia	Free	Contract expiration	
30 June 2019	DF	(Norway) Haitam Aleesami	27	(France) Amiens	Free	Contract expiration	
30 June 2019	DF	(Italy) Andrea Rispoli	30	(Italy) Lecce	Free	Contract expiration	
30 June 2019	MF	(Bosnia and Herzegovina) Mato Jajalo	31	(Italy) Udinese	Free	Contract expiration	
1 July 2019	GK	(Italy) Lorenzo Avogadri	17	(Italy) Atalanta	Free	End of loan	
1 July 2019	MF	(Switzerland) Nicolas Haas	23	(Italy) Atalanta	Free	End of loan	
1 July 2019	FW	(Uruguay) César Falletti	26	(Italy) Bologna	Free	End of loan	
1 July 2019	FW	(Romania) George Pușcaș	23	(Italy) Internazionale	Free	Option to buy not exercised	
1 July 2019	MF	(France) Eddy Gnahoré	25	(France) Amiens	€2.5M	Option to buy exercised	
12 July 2019	GK	(Italy) Alberto Brignoli	27	(Italy) Empoli	Free	Released for dissolution of club	
12 July 2019	DF	(Italy) Roberto Pirrello	23	(Italy) Empoli	Free	Released for dissolution of club	
12 July 2019	FW	(Italy) Kevin Cannavò	19	(Italy) Empoli	Free	Released for dissolution of club	
12 July 2019	FW	(Italy) Stefano Moreo	26	(Italy) Empoli	Free	Released for dissolution of club	
12 July 2019	DF	(Italy) Andrea Accardi	23	(Italy) Palermo	Free	Released for dissolution of club	
12 July 2019	DF	(Italy) Giuseppe Bellusci	29	(Italy) Monza	Free	Released for dissolution of club	
12 July 2019	DF	(Belgium) Corentin Fiore	24	(Belgium) Cercle Brugge	Free	Released for dissolution of club	
12 July 2019	DF	(Norway) Niklas Gunnarsson	28	(Norway) Sarpsborg	Free	Released for dissolution of club	
12 July 2019	DF	(Italy) Andrea Ingegneri	27	(Italy) Modena	Free	Released for dissolution of club	
12 July 2019	DF	(Italy) Antonio Mazzotta	29	(Italy) Crotone	Free	Released for dissolution of club	
12 July 2019	DF	(Serbia) Slobodan Rajković	30	Unattached	Free	Released for dissolution of club	
12 July 2019	DF	(Italy) Alessandro Salvi	31	(Italy) Frosinone	Free	Released for dissolution of club	
12 July 2019	DF	(Poland) Przemysław Szymiński	25	(Italy) Frosinone	Free	Released for dissolution of club	
12 July 2019	MF	(Bulgaria) Ivaylo Chochev	26	(Italy) Pescara	Free	Released for dissolution of club	
12 July 2019	MF	(Italy) Luca Fiordilino	22	(Italy) Venezia	Free	Released for dissolution of club	
12 July 2019	MF	(Italy) Antonino Gallo	19	(Italy) Lecce	Free	Released for dissolution of club	
12 July 2019	FW	(Italy) Simone Lo Faso	21	(Italy) Lecce	Free	Released for dissolution of club	
12 July 2019	MF	(Poland) Radosław Murawski	25	(Turkey) Denizlispor	Free	Released for dissolution of club	
12 July 2019	MF	(Italy) Simone Santoro	19	(Italy) Teramo	Free	Released for dissolution of club	
12 July 2019	FW	(Hungary) Norbert Balogh	23	(England) Hull City	Free	Released for dissolution of club	
12 July 2019	FW	(Guinea-Bissau) Carlos Embalo	24	(Belgium) Eupen	Free	Released for dissolution of club	
12 July 2019	FW	(North Macedonia) Ilija Nestorovski	29	(Italy) Udinese	Free	Released for dissolution of club	
12 July 2019	FW	(North Macedonia) Aleksandar Trajkovski	26	(Spain) Mallorca	Free	Released for dissolution of club	

===== Other acquisitions =====
Date	Pos.	Player	Age	Moving from	Fee	Notes	Source
1 July 2019	MF	(Italy) Marco Toscano	21	(Italy) Trapani	Free	End of loan	

===== Other disposals =====
Date	Pos.	Player	Age	Moving to	Fee	Notes	Source
24 June 2019	MF	(Italy) Marco Toscano	21	(Italy) Virtus Entella	Undisclosed	Permanent deal	

Total expenditure: €0

Total revenue: €2,900,000

Net income: ▲€2,900,000

==== New club ====
===== In =====
Date	Pos.	Player	Age	Moving from	Fee	Notes	Source
4 August 2019	FW	(Italy) Giovanni Ricciardo	32	(Italy) Cesena	Free	Permanent deal	
6 August 2019	FW	(Argentina) Mario Santana	37	(Italy) Pro Patria	Free	Permanent deal	
7 August 2019	FW	(Italy) Raimondo Lucera	18	(Italy) Palermo Youth Sector	Free	Permanent deal	
7 August 2019	DF	(Italy) Manuel Peretti	19	(Italy) Hellas Verona	Free	On loan until 30 June 2020	
8 August 2019	MF	(Italy) Danilo Ambro	20	(Italy) Feralpisalò	Free	Permanent deal	
8 August 2019	MF	(Italy) Luigi Mendola	18	(Italy) Vibonese	Free	On loan until 30 June 2020	
10 August 2019	DF	(Italy) Andrea Accardi	24	(Italy) Palermo	Free	Permanent deal	
10 August 2019	DF	(Albania) Masimiliano Doda	18	(Italy) Sampdoria	Free	Permanent deal	
10 August 2019	DF	(Italy) Francesco Vaccaro	20	(Italy) Altamura	Free	Permanent deal	
10 August 2019	GK	(Italy) Mattia Fallani	18	(Italy) SPAL	Free	On loan until 30 June 2020	
10 August 2019	GK	(Italy) Alberto Pelagotti	30	(Italy) Arezzo	Free	Permanent deal	
10 August 2019	MF	(Italy) Erdis Kraja	19	(Italy) Atalanta	Free	On loan until 30 June 2020	
10 August 2019	MF	(Italy) Andrea Rizzo Pinna	19	(Italy) Atalanta	Undisclosed	Permanent deal	
12 August 2019	MF	(Italy) Christian Langella	19	(Italy) Pisa	Free	On loan until 30 June 2020	
14 August 2019	DF	(Italy) Edoardo Lancini	25	(Italy) Brescia	Free	Permanent deal	
14 August 2019	MF	(Switzerland) Alessandro Martinelli	26	(Italy) Brescia	Free	Permanent deal	
15 August 2019	MF	(Argentina) Juan Mauri	30	(Italy) Lucchese	Free	Permanent deal	
21 August 2019	DF	(Italy) Lorenzo Bechini	18	(Italy) Sassuolo	Free	On loan until 30 June 2020	
21 August 2019	FW	(Italy) Mattia Felici	18	(Italy) Lecce	Free	On loan until 30 June 2020	
23 August 2019	DF	(Italy) Roberto Crivello	27	(Italy) Spezia	Free	Permanent deal	
25 August 2019	MF	(France) Malaury Martin	31	(Scotland) Hearts	Free	Permanent deal	
31 August 2019	GK	(Italy) Gabriele Corallo	17	(Italy) Trapani	Free	Permanent deal	
31 August 2019	MF	(Italy) Gianmarco Corsino	28	(Italy) Marsala	Free	Permanent deal	
31 August 2019	FW	(Italy) Andrea Ferrante	18	(Italy) Savio	Free	Permanent deal	
31 August 2019	DF	(Italy) Bubacarr Marong	19	(Italy) Parmonval	Free	Permanent deal	
6 September 2019	FW	(Italy) Luca Ficarrotta	29	(Italy) Marsala	€35,000	Permanent deal	

=== Post-summer transfers ===
Date	Pos.	Player	Age	Moving from	Fee	Notes	Source
18 September 2019	FW	(Italy) Ferdinando Sforzini	34	(Italy) Cavese	Free	Permanent deal	

=== Winter 2020 ===
==== In ====
Date	Pos.	Player	Age	Moving from	Fee	Notes	Source
30 December 2019	FW	(Italy) Andrea Silipo	18	(Italy) Roma	Free	On loan until 30 June 2020	
5 January 2020	FW	(Italy) Roberto Floriano	33	(Italy) Bari	Free	Permanent deal	
31 January 2020	FW	(Italy) Lorenzo Lucca	19	(Italy) Torino	Undisclosed	Permanent deal	

==== Out ====
Date	Pos.	Player	Age	Moving to	Fee	Notes	Source
31 January 2020	DF	(Italy) Lorenzo Bechini	18	(Italy) Sassuolo	Free	Released, early end of loan	

Total expenditure: €35,000

Total revenue: €0

Net income: ▼€35,000

== Pre-season and friendlies ==
17 August 2019 Friendly	Palermo (Italy)	5–0 (Note: Match was played in two halves of 40 and 35 minutes.)	(Italy) Supergiovane Castelbuono	Petralia Sottana
17:30 CEST (UTC+02:00)	Langella; Martinelli; Rizzo Pinna; Ricciardo	Report		Stadium: Comunale Pietro Sorrentino; Referee: Gianluca Li Vigni

22 August 2019 Friendly	Palermo (Italy)	6–0	(Italy) Lascari	Petralia Sottana
17:30 CEST (UTC+02:00)	Santana; Ricciardo; Martinelli; Felici	Report		Stadium: Comunale Pietro Sorrentino

26 August 2019 Friendly	Palermo (Italy)	6–0 (Note: Pelagotti and Fallani played for both teams.)	(Italy) Rosanero Legends	Palermo
20:30 CEST (UTC+02:00)	Mendola; Ricciardo; Lucera; Kraja	Report		Stadium: Renzo Barbera; Referee: Rosario Abisso

28 August 2019 Friendly	Palermo (Italy)	3–1	(Italy) Geraci	Palermo
15:00 CEST (UTC+02:00)	Ricciardo; Mar (o.g.); Jadel (o.g.)	Report	(pen.) Tarantino	Stadium: University sports center (CUS)

== Competitions ==
=== Overall ===
Competition	First match	Last match	Starting round	Final position	Record							
Competition	First match	Last match	Starting round	Final position	Pld	W	D	L	GF	GA	GD	Win %
Serie D	1 September 2019	1 March 2020	Matchday 1	Winners	26	20	3	3	47	16	+31	76.92
Coppa Italia Serie D	11 September 2019		Preliminary round	Preliminary round	1	0	1	0	1	1	+0	0.00
Total					27	20	4	3	48	17	+31	74.07

Source: Incontri Palermo 2019/20

=== Serie D ===
==== League table ====
Pos	Team	Pld	W	D	L	GF	GA	GD	Pts	Promotion, qualification or relegation
1	Palermo (P)	26	20	3	3	47	16	+31	63	Promotion to Serie C
2	Savoia	26	16	8	2	41	15	+26	56	
3	Giugliano	26	14	5	7	40	26	+14	47	
4	FC Messina	26	13	7	6	37	20	+17	46	
5	Troina	26	15	1	10	30	28	+2	46	

(P) Promoted

==== Results summary ====
Overall								Home						Away					
Pld	W	D	L	GF	GA	GD	Pts	W	D	L	GF	GA	GD	W	D	L	GF	GA	GD
26	20	3	3	47	16	+31	63	11	1	2	32	10	+22	9	2	1	15	6	+9

Source: Competitive matches

==== Results by round ====
Round	1	2	3	4	5	6	7	8	9	10	11	12	13	14	15	16	17	18	19	20	21	22	23	24	25	26	27	28	29	30	31	32	33	34
Ground	A	H	A	H	A	H	A	H	A	H	H	A	H	A	H	A	H	H	A	H	A	H	A	H	A	H	A	A	H	A	H	A	H	A
Result	W	W	W	W	W	W	W	W	W	W	L	D	W	W	L	W	D	W	D	W	W	W	W	W	L	W	C	C	C	C	C	C	C	C
Position	5	2	2	2	1	1	1	1	1	1	1	1	1	1	1	1	1	1	1	1	1	1	1	1	1	1	–	–	–	–	–	–	–	–

Source: Competitive matches
A = Away; H = Home; W = Win; D = Draw; L = Loss; C = Cancelled

=== Matches ===
==== Serie D - Group I ====
1 September 2019 1	Marsala	0–1	Palermo	Marsala
15:00 CEST (UTC+02:00)	Manfré (yellow card) 6'; Montuori (yellow card) 34'; Ficarrotta (yellow card) 42'	Report	(yellow card) 6' Lancini; (penalty missed) 36' Ricciardo; (yellow card) 77' Accardi; 82' Lucera	Stadium: Antonino Lombardo Angotta; Attendance: 6,000; Referee: Claudio Campobasso

8 September 2019 2	Palermo	3–2	San Tommaso	Palermo
15:00 CEST (UTC+02:00)	Ricciardo 7', 25'; Kraja 22'	Report	(yellow card) 64' Colarusso; 70' Tedesco; 90+4' (o.g.) Accardi	Stadium: Renzo Barbera; Attendance: 16,735; Referee: Leonardo Tesi

15 September 2019 3	Roccella	0–2	Palermo	Locri
15:00 CEST (UTC+02:00)	Mbaye (yellow card) 31'	Report	19' Doda; (yellow card) 40' Lancini; (yellow card) 65' Martinelli; 70' Ambro	Stadium: Comunale Barone Giuseppe Raffaele Macrì; Referee: Simone Taricone

22 September 2019 4	Palermo	3–1	Marina di Ragusa	Palermo
15:00 CEST (UTC+02:00)	Ricciardo 6'; Santana 51'; Kraja 52'; Crivello (yellow card) 78'	Report	11' Mistretta; (yellow card) 31' Carnemolla; (yellow card) 58' Baldeh	Stadium: Renzo Barbera; Attendance: 16,377; Referee: Giorgio Vergaro

29 September 2019 5	FC Messina	0–1	Palermo	Messina
15:00 CEST (UTC+02:00)	Melillo (yellow card) 80'	Report	58' Ficarrotta; (yellow card) 89' Martinelli	Stadium: San Filippo-Franco Scoglio; Attendance: 2,500; Referee: Luca De Angeli

6 October 2019 6	Palermo	4–1	Cittanovese	Palermo
15:00 CEST (UTC+02:00)	Ricciardo 2', 30' (pen.); Lancini 24'; Martinelli (yellow card) 51'; Sforzini 77'	Report	34' Giorgiò; (yellow card) 42' Cianci; (yellow card) 90+1' García	Stadium: Renzo Barbera; Attendance: 15,556; Referee: Roberto Lovison

13 October 2019 7	Biancavilla	1–2	Palermo	Biancavilla
15:00 CEST (UTC+02:00)	Crivello 1' (o.g.); Viglianisi (yellow card) 23'; Scoppetta (yellow card) 38'	Report	3' Ricciardo; 5' Santana; (yellow card) 30' Langella; (yellow card) 40' Vaccaro; (yellow card) 47' Felici; (yellow card) 58' Pelagotti; (yellow card) 78' Lancini	Stadium: Orazio Raiti; Referee: Mario Perri

20 October 2019 8	Palermo	2–1	Licata	Palermo
15:00 CEST (UTC+02:00)	Felici 28' (yellow card) 33'; Santana 30'; Lancini (yellow card) 82'; Peretti (yellow card) 90+4'	Report	(yellow card) 7' Doda; (yellow card) 15' (goal) 23' Maltese; (yellow card) 90+1' Diaby	Stadium: Renzo Barbera; Attendance: 19,726; Referee: Niccolò Turrini

27 October 2019 9	Nola	0–1	Palermo	Nola
14:30 CET (UTC+01:00)	Cardone (yellow card) 33'; Guarro (yellow card) 36'; Catavere (red card) 76'; Gargiulo (yellow card) 79'; Mileto (yellow card) 82'	Report	55' Lancini; (yellow card) 62' Martin; (yellow card) 73' Mauri; (yellow card) 90+1' Lucera	Stadium: Sporting Club; Attendance: 1,000; Referee: Francesco Lipizer

3 November 2019 10	Palermo	6–0	Corigliano	Palermo
14:30 CET (UTC+01:00)	Ficarrotta 8'; Martin 39'; Ricciardo 56' (pen.), 61'; Martinelli 75'; Doda (yellow card) 89'; Sforzini 90+2'	Report	(yellow card) 45' Proto	Stadium: Renzo Barbera; Attendance: 15,323; Referee: Maurizio Barbiero

10 November 2019 11	Palermo	0–1	Savoia	Palermo
14:30 CET (UTC+01:00)	Martin (yellow card) 9'; Vaccaro (yellow card) 45'; Ficarrotta (red card) 70'; Langella (yellow card) 84'; Lucera (yellow card) 89'	Report	(yellow card) 29' Cerone; (yellow card) 40' Dionisi; (yellow card) 45' Gatto; (yellow card) 61' Oyewale; 76' Diakité	Stadium: Renzo Barbera; Attendance: 17,049; Referee: Andrea Calzavara

17 November 2019 12	Palmese	0–0	Palermo	Palmi
14:30 CET (UTC+01:00)	Granata (yellow card) 21'; Bruno (yellow card) 70'; Misale (yellow card) 76'; Licastro (yellow card) 90+3'; Militano (yellow card)	Report	(yellow card) 22' Vaccaro; (yellow card) 72' Rizzo Pinna; (yellow card) 82' Lancini	Stadium: Giuseppe Lopresti; Attendance: 750; Referee: Marco Sicurello

24 November 2019 13	Palermo	1–0	ACR Messina	Palermo
14:30 CET (UTC+01:00)	Felici (yellow card) 44' (goal) 64'; Accardi (yellow card) 45+1'	Report	(yellow card) 50' Avella; (yellow card) 52' Orlando; (yellow card) 75' Ott Vale	Stadium: Renzo Barbera; Attendance: 14,941; Referee: Andrea Ancora

1 December 2019 14	Giugliano	0–1	Palermo	Mugnano di Napoli
14:30 CET (UTC+01:00)	Liccardo (yellow card) 25'; Mennella (yellow card) 82'	Report	(yellow card) 16' Martin; 36' Felici; (yellow card) 52' Vaccaro	Stadium: Alberto Vallefuoco; Attendance: 2,400; Referee: Emanuele Bracaccini

8 December 2019 15	Palermo	1–3	Acireale	Palermo
14:30 CET (UTC+01:00)	Doda (yellow card) 13'; Kraja 56'; Vaccaro (yellow card) 64'; Lancini (yellow card) 66' (yellow-red card) 82'	Report	(yellow card) 30' Cannino; 33' De Felice; 51' (yellow card) 88' Savanarola; 85' Rizzo; (yellow card) Rao	Stadium: Renzo Barbera; Attendance: 15,407; Referee: Valerio Crezzini

15 December 2019 16	Castrovillari	0–1	Palermo	Castrovillari
14:30 CET (UTC+01:00)	De Pace (yellow card) 45'; Cangemi (yellow card) 64'	Report	(yellow card) 22' Felici; 30' (pen.) (yellow card) 61' Ricciardo	Stadium: Polisportivo Mimmo Rende; Attendance: 1,200; Referee: Carlo Rinaldi

22 December 2019 17	Palermo	0–0	Troina	Palermo
14:30 CET (UTC+01:00)	Ricciardo (penalty missed) 24'; Vaccaro (yellow card) 38'; Ficarrotta (yellow card) 85'; Crivello (yellow card) 89'; Sforzini (penalty missed) 90+1'; Lancini (yellow card) 90+4'	Report	(yellow card) 17' De Santis; (yellow card) 55' Fernández; (yellow card) 71' Calandra; (yellow card) 88' Saba	Stadium: Renzo Barbera; Attendance: 14,455; Referee: Gabriele Restaldo

5 January 2020 18	Palermo	3–1	Marsala	Palermo
14:30 CET (UTC+01:00)	Mauri 45+4' (pen.); Pelagotti (yellow card) 50'; Langella 73' (yellow card) 80'; Silipo 90+3' (yellow card) 90+4'	Report	(yellow card) 30' Gallo; 51' (pen.) (yellow card) 90+1' Balistreri; (yellow card) 82' Candiano	Stadium: Renzo Barbera; Attendance: 14,845; Referee: Leonardo Tesi

11 January 2020 19	San Tommaso	1–1	Palermo	Pratola Serra
14:30 CET (UTC+01:00)	Alleruzzo (yellow card) 39' (goal) 86'	Report	46' Langella; (yellow card) 47' Floriano; (red card) 89' Vaccaro	Stadium: Comunale Modestino De Cicco; Referee: Mattia Ubaldi

19 January 2020 20	Palermo	1–0	Roccella	Palermo
14:30 CET (UTC+01:00)	Peretti (yellow card) 17'; Langella (yellow card) 48'; Lancini (yellow card) 53'; Floriano 67' (pen.); Martinelli (yellow card) 71'	Report	(yellow card) 16' Liviera; (yellow card) 65' (yellow-red card) 77' Mbaye; (penalty missed) 71' Khoris	Stadium: Renzo Barbera; Attendance: 14,603; Referee: Bogdan Nicolae Sfira

26 January 2020 21	Marina di Ragusa	0–1	Palermo	Ragusa
14:30 CET (UTC+01:00)	Mauro (yellow card) 28'; Puglisi (yellow card) 34'	Report	(yellow card) 43' Mauri; (yellow card) 50' Peretti; 52' Sforzini; (yellow card) 88' Martinelli	Stadium: Aldo Campo; Attendance: 3,000; Referee: Andrea Calzavara

2 February 2020 22	Palermo	2–0	FC Messina	Palermo
15:00 CET (UTC+01:00)	Sforzini 35', 90' (yellow card) 81'; Kraja (yellow card) 49'; Accardi (yellow card) 75'; Ficarrotta (yellow card) 90+4'	Report	(yellow card) 34' Brunetti; (yellow card) 90+1' A. Marchetti; (yellow card) D. Marchetti	Stadium: Renzo Barbera; Attendance: 16,998; Referee: Dario Di Francesco

9 February 2020 23	Cittanovese	2–4	Palermo	Cittanova
15:00 CET (UTC+01:00)	Giaimo 3'; Cianci (yellow card) 30'; Tripicchio 70' (pen.); Kacorri (yellow card) 74'; Biondo (yellow card) 86'; Mazzone (yellow card) 90+1'; Lavilla (yellow card)	Report	31' (pen.), 90+8' Floriano; 47' Langella; (yellow card) 49' (yellow-red card) 83' Lancini; (yellow card) 67' Martinelli; 87' Peretti	Stadium: Comunale Morreale-Proto; Referee: Ettore Longo

16 February 2020 24	Palermo	2–0	Biancavilla	Palermo
15:00 CET (UTC+01:00)	Pelagotti (yellow card) 56'; Silipo 73'; Lucca 78'; Mauri (yellow card) 82'	Report	(yellow card) 34' Guarnera	Stadium: Renzo Barbera; Attendance: 16,441; Referee: Simone Taricone

23 February 2020 25	Licata	2–0	Palermo	Licata
15:00 CET (UTC+01:00)	Daniello 10' (yellow card) 11'; Diaby (yellow card) 45+1'; Maltese (yellow card) 56'; Convitto 80'	Report	(yellow card) 36' Crivello; (yellow card) 45' Mauri	Stadium: Dino Liotta; Referee: Valerio Crezzini

1 March 2020 26	Palermo	4–0	Nola	Palermo
15:00 CET (UTC+01:00)	Felici 17'; Floriano 32', 76', 84'	Report		Stadium: Renzo Barbera; Attendance: 14,653; Referee: Adolfo Baratta

27	Corigliano	Cancelled	Palermo
Note: Match was initially scheduled for 8 March and it was meant to be played behind closed doors due to concerns over the coronavirus pandemic, but on 5 March it was postponed. On 9 March all sports events in Italy were suspended until 3 April due to a pandemic of COVID-19 in Europe and suspension was extended over time until 20 May, as Serie D was definitely suspended and match was cancelled.

28	Savoia	Cancelled	Palermo
Note: Match was initially scheduled for 22 March and it was meant to be played behind closed doors due to concerns over the coronavirus pandemic, but it was postponed because on 9 March all sports events in Italy were suspended until 3 April due to a pandemic of COVID-19 in Europe. Suspension was extended over time until 20 May, as Serie D was definitely suspended and match was cancelled.

29	Palermo	Cancelled	Palmese
Note: Match was initially scheduled for 29 March and it was meant to be played behind closed doors due to concerns over the coronavirus pandemic, but it was postponed because on 9 March all sports events in Italy were suspended until 3 April due to a pandemic of COVID-19 in Europe. Suspension was extended over time until 20 May, as Serie D was definitely suspended and match was cancelled.

30	ACR Messina	Cancelled	Palermo
Note: Match was initially scheduled for 5 April, but it was postponed because on 1 April all sports events in Italy were suspended until 13 April due to a pandemic of COVID-19 in Europe. Suspension was extended over time until 20 May, as Serie D was definitely suspended and match was cancelled.

31	Palermo	Cancelled	Giugliano
Note: Match was initially scheduled for 9 April, but it was postponed because on 1 April all sports events in Italy were suspended until 13 April due to a pandemic of COVID-19 in Europe. Suspension was extended over time until 20 May, as Serie D was definitely suspended and match was cancelled.

32	Acireale	Cancelled	Palermo
Note: Match was initially scheduled for 19 April, but it was postponed because on 10 April all sports events in Italy were suspended until 4 May due to a pandemic of COVID-19 in Europe. On 2 May suspension was extended until 18 May, but on 20 May Serie D was definitely suspended and match was cancelled.

33	Palermo	Cancelled	Castrovillari
Note: Match was initially scheduled for 26 April, but it was postponed because on 10 April all sports events in Italy were suspended until 4 May due to a pandemic of COVID-19 in Europe. On 2 May suspension was extended until 18 May, but on 20 May Serie D was definitely suspended and match was cancelled.

34	Troina	Cancelled	Palermo
Note: Match was initially scheduled for 3 May, but it was postponed because on 10 April all sports events in Italy were suspended until 4 May due to a pandemic of COVID-19 in Europe. On 2 May suspension was extended until 18 May, but on 20 May Serie D was definitely suspended and match was cancelled.

=== Coppa Italia Serie D ===
11 September 2019 Preliminary round	Palermo	1–1 (2–4 p)	Biancavilla	Palermo
16:00 CEST (UTC+02:00)	Santana 47'	Report	20' Marcellino; (yellow card) 26' Lo Presti; (yellow card) 30' Yoboua; (yellow card) 89' (yellow-red card) 90+7' Maimone; (yellow card) 90+6' Viglianisi	Stadium: Renzo Barbera; Attendance: 2,800; Referee: Ignazio Crescenti
	Penalties
	Santana (penalty scored); Peretti (penalty scored); Mauri (penalty missed); Crivello (penalty missed)		(penalty scored) Amaya; (penalty scored) Viglianisi; (penalty scored) Maiorano; (penalty scored) Bonaccorsi

=== Appearances and goals ===
As of 1 March 2020

No.	Pos	Nat	Player	Total		Serie D		Coppa Italia Serie D	
No.	Pos	Nat	Player	Apps	Goals	Apps	Goals	Apps	Goals
Goalkeepers
1	GK	(Italy) ITA	Alberto Pelagotti	25	-16	25	-16	0	0
12	GK	(Italy) ITA	Gabriele Corallo	0	0	0	0	0	0
22	GK	(Italy) ITA	Mattia Fallani	4	-1	3	0	1	-1
Defenders
3	DF	(Italy) ITA	Lorenzo Bechini	0	0	0	0	0	0
4	DF	(Italy) ITA	Andrea Accardi	17	0	16	0	1	0
15	DF	(Italy) ITA	Bubacarr Marong	0	0	0	0	0	0
19	DF	(Italy) ITA	Edoardo Lancini	24	2	23	2	1	0
23	DF	(Albania) ALB	Masimiliano Doda	22	1	21	1	1	0
24	DF	(Italy) ITA	Roberto Crivello	23	0	22	0	1	0
27	DF	(Italy) ITA	Francesco Vaccaro	21	0	20	0	1	0
42	DF	(Italy) ITA	Christian Cangemi	0	0	0	0	0	0
54	DF	(Italy) ITA	Manuel Peretti	15	1	14	1	1	0
Midfielders
5	MF	(Italy) ITA	Danilo Ambro	18	1	17	1	1	0
6	MF	(Switzerland) SUI	Alessandro Martinelli	25	1	24	1	1	0
7	MF	(Italy) ITA	Gianmarco Corsino	1	0	0	0	1	0
8	MF	(France) FRA	Malaury Martin	24	1	24	1	0	0
10	MF	(Italy) ITA	Andrea Rizzo Pinna	3	0	2	0	1	0
20	MF	(Italy) ITA	Luigi Mendola	0	0	0	0	0	0
26	MF	(Argentina) ARG	Juan Mauri	16	1	15	1	1	0
33	MF	(Italy) ITA	Christian Langella	25	3	24	3	1	0
72	MF	(Italy) ITA	Salvatore Florio	0	0	0	0	0	0
73	MF	(Italy) ITA	Erdis Kraja	21	3	21	3	0	0
Forwards
9	FW	(Italy) ITA	Giovanni Ricciardo	20	9	20	9	0	0
11	FW	(Argentina) ARG	Mario Santana	13	4	12	3	1	1
14	FW	(Italy) ITA	Luca Ficarrotta	17	2	16	2	1	0
17	FW	(Italy) ITA	Andrea Ferrante	1	0	1	0	0	0
18	FW	(Italy) ITA	Lorenzo Lucca	3	1	3	1	0	0
21	FW	(Italy) ITA	Raimondo Lucera	8	1	7	1	1	0
25	FW	(Italy) ITA	Roberto Floriano	8	6	8	6	0	0
30	FW	(Italy) ITA	Andrea Silipo	9	2	9	2	0	0
32	FW	(Italy) ITA	Ferdinando Sforzini	14	5	14	5	0	0
75	FW	(Italy) ITA	Mattia Felici	25	4	25	4	0	0

=== Goalscorers ===
As of 1 March 2020

Rank	No.	Pos	Nat	Name	Serie D	Coppa Italia Serie D	Total
1	9	FW	(Italy)	Giovanni Ricciardo	9		9
2	25	FW	(Italy)	Roberto Floriano	6		6
3	32	FW	(Italy)	Ferdinando Sforzini	5		5
4	75	FW	(Italy)	Mattia Felici	4		4
4	11	FW	(Argentina)	Mario Santana	3	1	4
6	73	MF	(Italy)	Erdis Kraja	3		3
6	23	MF	(Italy)	Christian Langella	3		3
8	14	FW	(Italy)	Luca Ficarrotta	2		2
8	19	DF	(Italy)	Edoardo Lancini	2		2
8	30	FW	(Italy)	Andrea Silipo	2		2
11	5	MF	(Italy)	Danilo Ambro	1		1
11	23	DF	(Albania)	Masimiliano Doda	1		1
11	18	FW	(Italy)	Lorenzo Lucca	1		1
11	21	FW	(Italy)	Raimondo Lucera	1		1
11	8	MF	(France)	Malaury Martin	1		1
11	6	MF	(Switzerland)	Alessandro Martinelli	1		1
11	26	MF	(Argentina)	Juan Mauri	1		1
11	54	DF	(Italy)	Manuel Peretti	1		1
Own goal							0
Totals					47	1	48

=== Clean sheets ===
As of 1 March 2020

Rank	No.	Pos	Nat	Name	Serie D	Coppa Italia Serie D	Total
1	1	GK	(Italy)	Alberto Pelagotti	14 (Note: Weeks: 1, 3, 5, 9-10, 13-14, 16-17, 20-22, 24, 26.)		14
2	22	GK	(Italy)	Mattia Fallani	3 (Note: Weeks: 10-12.)		3
Totals					15 (Note: Pelagotti and Fallani both played on matchdays 10 and 11, so the statistics Totals refers to clean sheets kept by the team.)	0	15

=== Disciplinary record ===
As of 1 March 2020

No.	Pos	Nat	Name	Serie D			Coppa Italia Serie D			Total		
No.	Pos	Nat	Name	Yellow card	(yellow card) (yellow-red card)	Red card	Yellow card	(yellow card) (yellow-red card)	Red card	Yellow card	(yellow card) (yellow-red card)	Red card
27	DF	(Italy)	Francesco Vaccaro	6		1				6	0	1
14	FW	(Italy)	Luca Ficarrotta	2		1				2	0	1
19	DF	(Italy)	Edoardo Lancini	7	2					7	2	0
6	MF	(Switzerland)	Alessandro Martinelli	6						6	0	0
75	FW	(Italy)	Mattia Felici	4						4	0	0
26	MF	(Argentina)	Juan Mauri	4						4	0	0
4	DF	(Italy)	Andrea Accardi	3						3	0	0
24	DF	(Italy)	Roberto Crivello	3						3	0	0
33	MF	(Italy)	Christian Langella	3						3	0	0
8	MF	(France)	Malaury Martin	3						3	0	0
1	GK	(Italy)	Alberto Pelagotti	3						3	0	0
54	DF	(Italy)	Manuel Peretti	3						3	0	0
23	DF	(Albania)	Masimiliano Doda	2						2	0	0
21	FW	(Italy)	Raimondo Lucera	2						2	0	0
25	FW	(Italy)	Roberto Floriano	1						1	0	0
73	MF	(Italy)	Erdis Kraja	1						1	0	0
9	FW	(Italy)	Giovanni Ricciardo	1						1	0	0
10	MF	(Italy)	Andrea Rizzo Pinna	1						1	0	0
32	FW	(Italy)	Ferdinando Sforzini	1						1	0	0
30	FW	(Italy)	Andrea Silipo	1						1	0	0
Totals				57	2	2	0	0	0	57	2	2

=== Attendances ===
As of 1 March 2020.

	Matches	Attendances	Average	Highest	Lowest
Serie D	14	223,109	15,936	19,726	14,455
Coppa Italia Serie D	1	2,800	2,800	2,800	2,800
Total	15	225,909	15,061	19,726	2,800
