= Balistreri =

Balistreri is a surname. Notable people with the surname include:

- Frank Balistreri, American businessman
- John Balistreri (born 1962), American ceramic artist
- Pietro Balistreri (born 1986), American football player
- Rosa Balistreri (1927–1990), Italian singer
