= Bruno Merci =

Italian footballer

Personal information
- Full name: Bruno Merci
- Date of birth: 4 July 2002 (age 24)
- Place of birth: Verona
- Position: Forward

Youth career
- 2012-2018: Messina
- 2018-2020: Chievo Verona

Senior career*
Years	Team	Apps	(Gls)
2020-2021	Ambrosiana	20	
2021	San Martino	11	(1)
- * Club domestic league appearances and goals

Bruno Merci (born 4 July 2002) is an Italian former player who play as a forward.

== Career ==
Bruno Merci commenced his career within the youth ranks of FC Messina, subsequently transferring in 2013 to the esteemed academy of Chievo.

Over the following years, he ascended through various youth divisions, progressing from the Under-17 squad to the Primavera team. During the 2019/2020 season, he represented Chievo's Under-17 side before advancing to the Under-19s, continuing his athletic and technical development.

In 2020, Merci made a significant move to Ambrosiana, where he featured in numerous matches. By August 2021, he transitioned to San Martino, a club in Serie D, with an assessed market value of €10,000. Throughout his career, he has participated in an array of competitions, including Serie D, Primavera, and the prestigious Coppa Primavera.

== Music career ==
Bruno Merci is currently showcasing his musical talents as a participant in the live stages of X Factor Italia, where he performs as part of the band "The Foolz."
