= Ignacio Lores =

Uruguayan footballer (born 1991)

Personal information
- Full name: Ignacio Lores Varela
- Date of birth: 26 April 1991 (age 35)
- Place of birth: Montevideo, Uruguay
- Height: 1.82 m (5 ft 11 1/2 in)
- Position: Winger

Team information
- Current team: Athletic Club Palermo

Youth career
- 2007–2009: Defensor Sporting

Senior career*
Years	Team	Apps	(Gls)
2009–2011	Defensor Sporting	10	(0)
2011–2015	Palermo	12	(0)
2012	→ Botev Vratsa (loan)	8	(0)
2013	→ CSKA Sofia (loan)	13	(1)
2014	→ Bari (loan)	8	(0)
2014–2015	→ Vicenza (loan)	15	(1)
2015	→ Varese (loan)	5	(0)
2015–2017	Pisa	53	(8)
2017–2018	Ascoli	35	(3)
2018–2019	Peñarol	31	(4)
2020	Wanderers	10	(1)
2020–2021	Nacional	17	(0)
2021–2022	Siena	17	(4)
2022–2023	Cittadella	44	(0)
2023–2024	Avellino	18	(0)
2024	Taranto	8	(0)
2025–	Athletic Club Palermo	19	(1)

International career
2011	Uruguay U20	6	(1)
- * Club domestic league appearances and goals as of 19 April 2026

Ignacio Lores Varela (born 26 April 1991) is a Uruguayan footballer, currently playing for Serie D club Athletic Club Palermo. He is a former Uruguay U20 international. Lores also holds Spanish passport.

== Career ==
Lores started his football career with Defensor Sporting, making his debut in the Uruguayan Primera División during the 2009–10 season. He made a total of 10 league appearances with the Montevideo-based club.

=== Palermo ===
On 9 July 2011, Lores signed a five-year deal with Italian side Palermo for €2.8 million. He was given the number 26 jersey. Lores made his Serie A debut in a 3–1 home win against Bologna on 5 November, coming on as a first-half substitute, replacing the injured Abel Hernández early in the first half. Ignacio started his first Serie A match for Palermo in a 0–0 draw against Parma at the Stadio Ennio Tardini on 4 December.

==== Loans to Botev Vratsa and CSKA Sofia ====
On 29 August 2012, he moved on loan to Bulgarian A PFG team Botev Vratsa. After eight appearances, on 1 February 2013, Lores was loaned out to another A PFG club CSKA Sofia for one and a half years. On 31 March, in a 3–0 home victory over Minyor Pernik, Lores assisted Martin Kamburov for the first goal in a game and later netted his first goal, scoring CSKA's second. He finished the season with 20 appearances and one goal in the league, scored in the 19th day, and two appearances in the domestic cup.

==== Return to Palermo and Serie B loans ====
He returned to Palermo for the 2013–14 season and played his first game on 11 August 2013, in the second round of the Italian Cup, which he won 2–1 against Cremonese.

However, in January 2014, he moved on loan to Serie B side Bari, making eight appearances in total. On 12 September 2014, he was loaned out to another Serie B club, Vicenza, for the full 2014–15 season.

He then signed for Pisa, winning a promotion to Serie B from Lega Pro under coach Gennaro Ivan Gattuso. In July 2017, he left Pisa after two seasons to join another Serie B club, Ascoli.

=== Peñarol ===
In July 2018, he returned to Uruguay, signing with Peñarol.

=== Nacional ===
After playing the Torneo Apertura with Montevideo Wanderers F.C., he signed with Club Nacional de Football until the end of the season 2020-2021.

=== Siena ===
His contract with Siena was terminated by mutual consent on 25 January 2022.

=== Cittadella, Taranto and amateur football ===
On 25 January 2022, he joined Serie B club Cittadella.

On 29 August 2024, Lores signed a two-season contract with Taranto. He, however, announced his retirement just two months after joining Taranto, on 28 October.

On 25 July 2025, Lores came out of retirement to join Serie D club Athletic Club Palermo.

== International career ==
He has been capped by the Uruguay national under-20 football team at the 2011 FIFA U-20 World Cup.

In May 2011, he won the Suwon Cup with Uruguay's National Under-20 team, playing all three games and scoring one goal – the first in the National – in the second game against Nigeria, which ended 2–2.
