= Marong (surname) =

Marong is a Gambian surname. Notable people with the surname include:

- Bubacarr Marong (born 2000), Gambian footballer
- Edrissa Marong (1996/7–2023), Gambian long-distance runner
- Nuha Marong (born 1993), Spanish-born Gambian footballer
- Ousman Marong (born 1999), Gambian footballer
