= Francesco Vaccaro =

Francesco Vaccaro may refer to:

- Francesco Vaccaro (painter) (c. 1636–1675), Bolognese painter and engraver of the Baroque period
- Francesco Vaccaro (footballer) (born 1999), Italian footballer
