= 2004–05 US Città di Palermo season =

Season of football team

U.S. Città di Palermo played the season 2004–05 in the Serie A league. It was the first time Palermo entered the top division since 1973.

== Review and events ==
Palermo returned to Serie A in 2004 as Serie B champions. Francesco Guidolin was confirmed at the helm of the rosanero and a number of valuable signings were made in the summer market: among them, Andrea Barzagli, Cristian Zaccardo, Simone Barone (all three then part of the Italian squad that won the 2006 FIFA World Cup) and Argentines Mariano González and Ernesto Farías. The team was widely expected to be a candidate for a mid-table place because of the high quality of its roster. All these events provoked a notable excitement among the local fanbase, leading to a sale of over 30,000 season tickets which caused each Stadio Renzo Barbera seat to be assigned to a season ticket holder.

Palermo enjoyed a great start and quickly entered into the race for a UEFA Cup spot, ending the first half of the season in fifth place, only three points behind fourth-placed Inter. For a while the team appeared also capable to fight for a place in the next Champions' League, but failed in do so and Udinese eventually gained the last of the four available spots. Palermo ended in sixth place with 53 points, nine behind Udinese and eight behind fifth-placed Sampdoria. After the final match, Guidolin tended his resignations, and Luigi Delneri was quickly appointed at his place.

In the Coppa Italia tournament, the rosanero reached the round of 16 after having defeated Salernitana 3–2 on aggregate. The return match notably marked the only two goals by Argentine striker Ernesto Farías, who failed to impress in the Italian top league and was sold to River Plate in the January transfer window. In order to replace him, Davide Possanzini was signed from AlbinoLeffe. Palermo then went on to be defeated 4–1 on aggregate by AC Milan.

== 2004-05 squad ==
No.	Pos	Nat	Player	Total		Serie A		Coppa Italia	
No.	Pos	Nat	Player	Apps	Goals	Apps	Goals	Apps	Goals
99	GK	(Italy) ITA	Guardalben	37	-41	37	-41	0	0
11	DF	(Italy) ITA	Grosso	38	1	36	1	2	0
21	DF	(Italy) ITA	Biava	32	0	29	0	3	0
43	DF	(Italy) ITA	Barzagli	40	0	37	0	3	0
2	DF	(Italy) ITA	Zaccardo	37	2	35	2	2	0
5	MF	(Italy) ITA	Corini	37	0	35	0	2	0
8	MF	(Italy) ITA	Barone	38	2	35	2	3	0
10	MF	(Italy) ITA	Zauli	28	4	27	4	1	0
18	MF	(Argentina) ARG	Santana	33	3	30	3	3	0
90	MF	(Italy) ITA	Brienza	37	11	33	10	4	1
9	FW	(Italy) ITA	Toni	36	21	35	20	1	1
1	GK	(Italy) ITA	Santoni	5	-9	1	-3	4	-6
6	DF	(Italy) ITA	Terlizzi	19	1	15	1	4	0
25	DF	(Sierra Leone) SLE	Conteh	15	0	14	0	1	0
4	MF	(Italy) ITA	Morrone	27	0	23	0	4	0
19	MF	(Argentina) ARG	Gonzalez	25	2	21	2	4	0
20	MF	(Italy) ITA	Raimondi	17	0	14	0	3	0
22	MF	(Italy) ITA	Mutarelli	26	1	24	1	2	0
84	GK	(Italy) ITA	Comi	0	0	0	0	0	0
13	DF	(Italy) ITA	Accardi	3	0	1	0	2	0
81	DF	(Italy) ITA	Ferri	9	0	7	0	2	0
14	FW	(Italy) ITA	Possanzini	2	0	2	0	0	0
26	FW	(Italy) ITA	Balistreri	3	0	2	0	1	0
Players sold or loaned out during the January transfer market:
30	DF	(Brazil) BRA	da Silva	3	0	1	0	2	0
46	MF	(Italy) ITA	Gasbarroni	9	0	9	0	0	0
7	FW	(Argentina) ARG	Farias	16	2	13	0	3	2

=== January transfer market bids ===
In

14	FW	ITA	Davide Possanzini (from AlbinoLeffe)

Out

30	DF	BRA	Adriano Pereira da Silva (loaned to Atalanta)
46	MF	ITA	Andrea Gasbarroni (to Sampdoria)
7	FW	ARG	Ernesto Farías (to River Plate)

== Results ==
=== Serie A ===
Pos	Team	Pld	W	D	L	GF	GA	GD	Pts	Qualification or relegation
4	Udinese	38	17	11	10	56	40	+16	62	Qualification to Champions League third qualifying round
5	Sampdoria	38	17	10	11	42	29	+13	61	Qualification to UEFA Cup first round
6	Palermo	38	12	17	9	48	44	+4	53	Qualification to UEFA Cup first round
7	Messina	38	12	12	14	44	52	−8	48	
8	Roma (Note: Roma gained entry to the 2005–06 UEFA Cup as 2004–05 Coppa Italia runners-up: champions Internazionale qualified to the 2005–06 UEFA Champions League.)	38	11	12	15	55	58	−3	45	Qualification to UEFA Cup first round

Source: 2004–05 Serie A, RSSSF.com, Soccerway
Rules for classification: 1) Points; 2) Head-to-head points; 3) Head-to-head goal difference; 4) Goal difference; 5) Goals scored; 6) Draw. (Note: Head-to-head record is used only after all the matches between the teams in question have been played).

==== Matches ====
12 September 2004 1	Palermo	1–0	Siena	Palermo
15.00		Report		Stadium: Renzo Barbera

18 September 2004 2	Inter Milan	1–1	Palermo	Milan
20.30		Report

22 September 2004 3	Palermo	0–0	Fiorentina	Palermo
20.30		Report		Stadium: Renzo Barbera

25 September 2004 4	Juventus	1–1	Palermo	Turin
20.30		Report

3 October 2004 5	Palermo	1–0	Bologna	Palermo
15.00		Report		Stadium: Renzo Barbera

17 October 2004 6	Lecce	2–0	Palermo	Lecco
15.00		Report

24 October 2004 7	AS Roma	1–1	Palermo	Rome
15.00		Report		Stadium: Olimpico

27 October 2004 8	Palermo	1–2	Livorno	Palermo
20.30		Report		Stadium: Renzo Barbera

31 October 2004 9	Udinese	1–0	Palermo	Udine
20.30		Report

7 November 2004 10	Palermo	1–1	Parma	Palermo
15.00		Report		Stadium: Renzo Barbera

11 November 2004 11	Messina	0–0	Palermo	Messina
20.30		Report

14 November 2004 12	Palermo	2–0	Sampdoria	Palermo
15.00		Report		Stadium: Renzo Barbera

28 November 2004 13	Brescia	0–2	Palermo	Brescia
15.00

5 December 2004 14	Palermo	1–0	Atalanta	Palermo
15.00				Stadium: Renzo Barbera

12 December 2004 15	Chievo	2–1	Palermo	Verona
15.00

19 December 2004 16	Palermo	3–0	Cagliari	Palermo
20.30				Stadium: Renzo Barbera

6 January 2005 17	Reggina	1–0	Palermo
15.00

9 January 2005 18	Palermo	0–0	AC Milan	Palermo
20.30				Stadium: Renzo Barbera

16 January 2005 19	Lazio	1–3	Palermo
15.00

23 January 2005 20	Siena	0–0	Palermo
15.00

30 January 2005 21	Palermo	0–2	Inter Milan	Palermo
20.30				Stadium: Renzo Barbera

2 February 2005 22	Fiorentina	1–2	Palermo
20.30

5 February 2005 23	Palermo	1–0	Juventus	Palermo
20.30				Stadium: Renzo Barbera

13 February 2005 24	Bologna	1–1	Palermo	Bologna
15.00				Stadium: Stadio Renato Dall'Ara

20 February 2005 25	Palermo	3–2	Lecce	Palermo
15.00				Stadium: Renzo Barbera

27 February 2005 26	Palermo	2–0	AS Roma	Palermo
15.00				Stadium: Renzo Barbera

6 March 2005 27	Livorno	2–2	Palermo	Livorno
20.30

13 March 2005 28	Palermo	1–5	Udinese	Palermo
15.00				Stadium: Renzo Barbera

20 March 2005 29	Parma	3–3	Palermo	Parma
15.00				Stadium: Il Tardini

10 April 2005 30	Palermo	2–1	Messina	Palermo
15.00				Stadium: Renzo Barbera

16 April 2005 31	Sampdoria	1–0	Palermo	Genova
20.30

20 April 2005 32	Palermo	3–3	Brescia	Palermo
20.30				Stadium: Renzo Barbera

24 April 2005 33	Atalanta	1–0	Palermo	Bergamo
15.00

1 May 2005 34	Palermo	2–2	Chievo	Palermo
20.30		Report		Stadium: Renzo Barbera

8 May 2005 35	Cagliari	0–0	Palermo	Cagliari
15.00		Report

15 May 2005 36	Palermo	1–1	Reggina	Palermo
15.00		Report		Stadium: Renzo Barbera

20 May 2005 37	AC Milan	3–3	Palermo	Milan
20.30		Report

29 May 2005 38	Palermo	3–3	Lazio	Palermo
15.00		Report		Stadium: Renzo Barbera

=== Coppa Italia ===
Date and time	Opponent team	Home/Away	Result
Sep 15, 2004 – 20.30	Salernitana	A	1-2
Sep 28, 2004 – 18.00	Salernitana	H	2-0
Nov 20, 2004 – 21.00	AC Milan	H	1-2
Jan 12, 2005 – 21.00	AC Milan	A	0-2
