= Juan Mauri =

Argentine-Italian footballer

Personal information
- Full name: Juan Alberto Mauri
- Date of birth: 29 December 1988 (age 37)
- Place of birth: Realicó, Argentina
- Height: 1.80 m (5 ft 11 in)
- Position: Midfielder

Youth career
- Olimpo

Senior career*
Years	Team	Apps	(Gls)
2009–2013	Olimpo	14	(0)
2013–2014	Ferro Carril Oeste	11	(0)
2014	Gimnasia y Tiro	13	(0)
2015	Club General Belgrano	5	(0)
2015	Club Tiro Federal Bahía Blanca	13	(0)
2015–2018	AC Milan	0	(0)
2015–2016	→ Akragas (loan)	19	(0)
2016–2017	→ Paganese (loan)	17	(0)
2018–2019	Lucchese	31	(0)
2019–2020	Palermo	15	(1)
- * Club domestic league appearances and goals as of 21:43, 1 March 2020 (UTC)

Juan Alberto Mauri (born 29 December 1988) is an Argentine professional footballer who plays as a midfielder. He also holds Italian citizenship.

== Club career ==
He made his Primera B Nacional debut for Olimpo on 24 October 2009 in a game against All Boys.

In August 2019, after playing a single Serie C season for Lucchese, Mauri joined Serie D club Palermo as a free agent.

== Personal life ==
His younger brother José Mauri is also a football player. Juan signed a four-year contract with Milan shortly after José in a "package deal" as they were represented by the same agent, but never appeared for Milan, even on the bench, before his contract was bought out three years later, in the summer of 2018.

== Career statistics ==
=== Club ===
As of 1 March 2020

Appearances and goals by club, season and competition
Club	Season	League			National cup		Other		Total	
Club	Season	Division	Apps	Goals	Apps	Goals	Apps	Goals	Apps	Goals
Olimpo	2009–10	Primera B Nacional	4	0	—		—		4	0
Olimpo	2010–11	Primera División	2	0	—		—		2	0
Olimpo	2011–12	Primera División	8	0	0	0	—		8	0
Olimpo	Total		14	0	0	0	0	0	14	0
Ferro Carril Oeste	2012–13	Primera B Nacional	11	0	0	0	—		11	0
Gimnasia y Tiro	2013–14	Torneo Argentino A	13	0	1	0	—		14	0
General Belgrano	2014	Torneo Federal A	5	0	2	0	—		7	0
Tiro Federal	2015	Torneo Federal A	13	0	—		—		13	0
Milan	2017–18	Serie A	0	0	0	0	—		0	0
Akragas (loan)	2015–16	Lega Pro	19	0	5	0	—		24	0
Paganese (loan)	2016–17	Lega Pro	17	0	0	0	1 (Note: All appearance(s) in promotion play-offs.)	0	18	0
Lucchese	2018–19	Serie C	31	0	0	0	4 (Note: All appearance(s) in relegation play-outs.)	0	35	0
Palermo	2019–20	Serie D	15	1	1	0	—		16	1
Career total			138	1	9	0	5	0	152	1
