= Velodromo Paolo Borsellino =

Stadium in Palermo, Italy

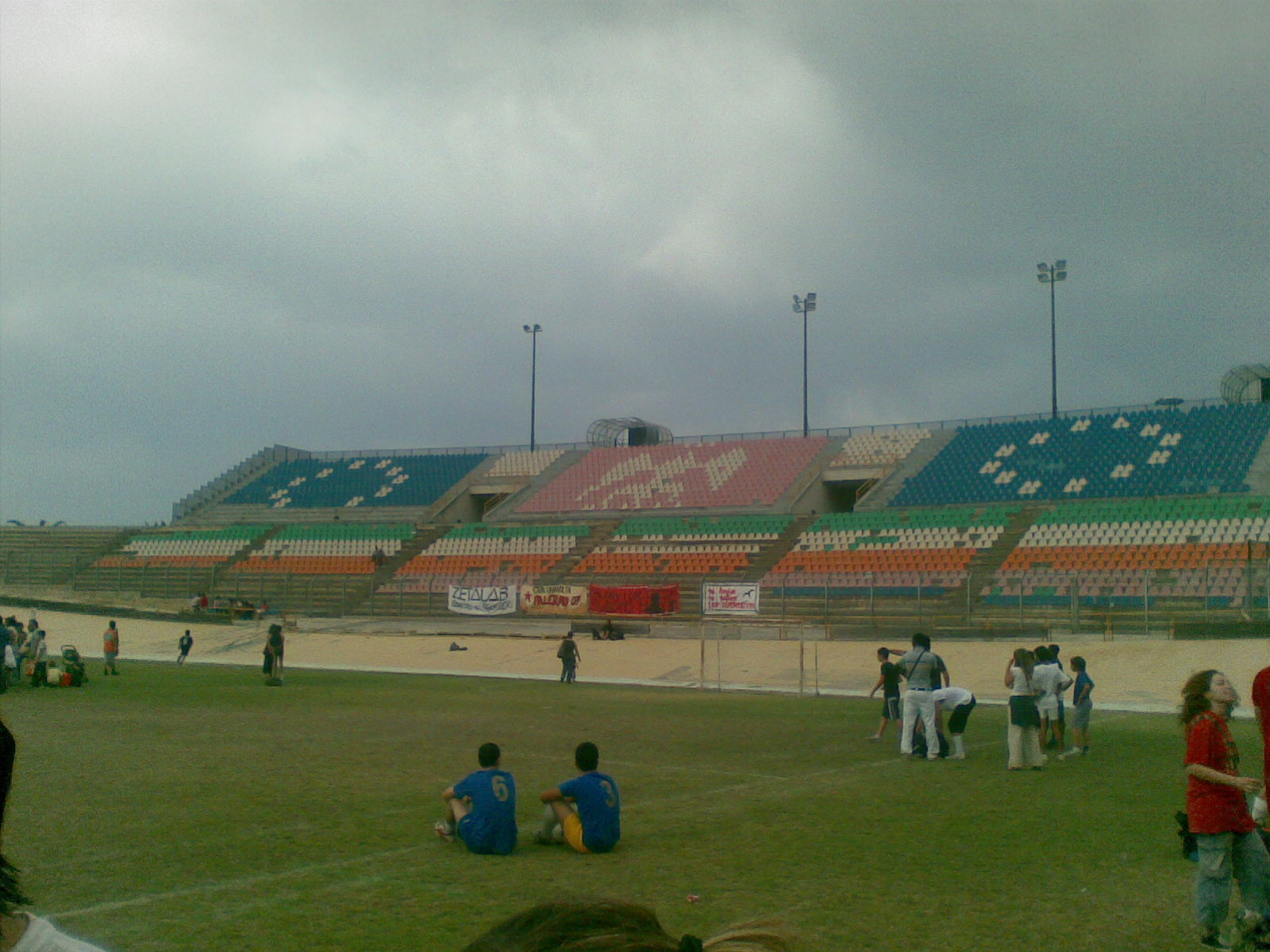
- Interactive map of Velodromo Paolo Borsellino
- Full name: Velodromo Paolo Borsellino
- Location: Palermo, Italy
- Coordinates: 38.17316°N 13.31337°E
- Owner: Municipality of Palermo
- Capacity: 11,155 (football, rugby) 30,000 (concerts, end-stage)
- Surface: Grass
- Field size: 100 x 60 m

Construction
- Opened: 1991

Tenants
- SSD Athletic Club Palermo (Association football); Sharks Palermo (American football); Palermo Rugby 2005 (Rugby football)

Velodromo Paolo Borsellino is a multi-use stadium in Palermo, Italy, located in the ZEN neighbourhood of the city, and currently home to local American football club Sharks Palermo and rugby football club Palermo Rugby 2005. It is named after Palermo magistrate and Mafia victim Paolo Borsellino.

The venue, initially thought as a velodrome which could also serve as a multi-use stadium, was completed in 1991, and hosted the 1994 UCI Track Cycling World Championships held in Palermo. The venue was successively used by association football club U.S. Città di Palermo in the late 1990s due to the unavailability of their home venue, Stadio La Favorita. The venue was successively used by others Palermo-based football club, ASD Fincantieri Palermo, during the 2003–04 season in the Serie D, and SSD Athletic Club Palermo, from the 2025–26 season. It was also used by the Palermo under-19 team until 2007.

In 2007, Palermo announced plans to build a new stadium in the city, suggesting the possibility of demolishing the "Velodromo" and creating a new football-only venue in its place. The issue is still under discussion.

== Velodromo Borsellino as a music venue ==
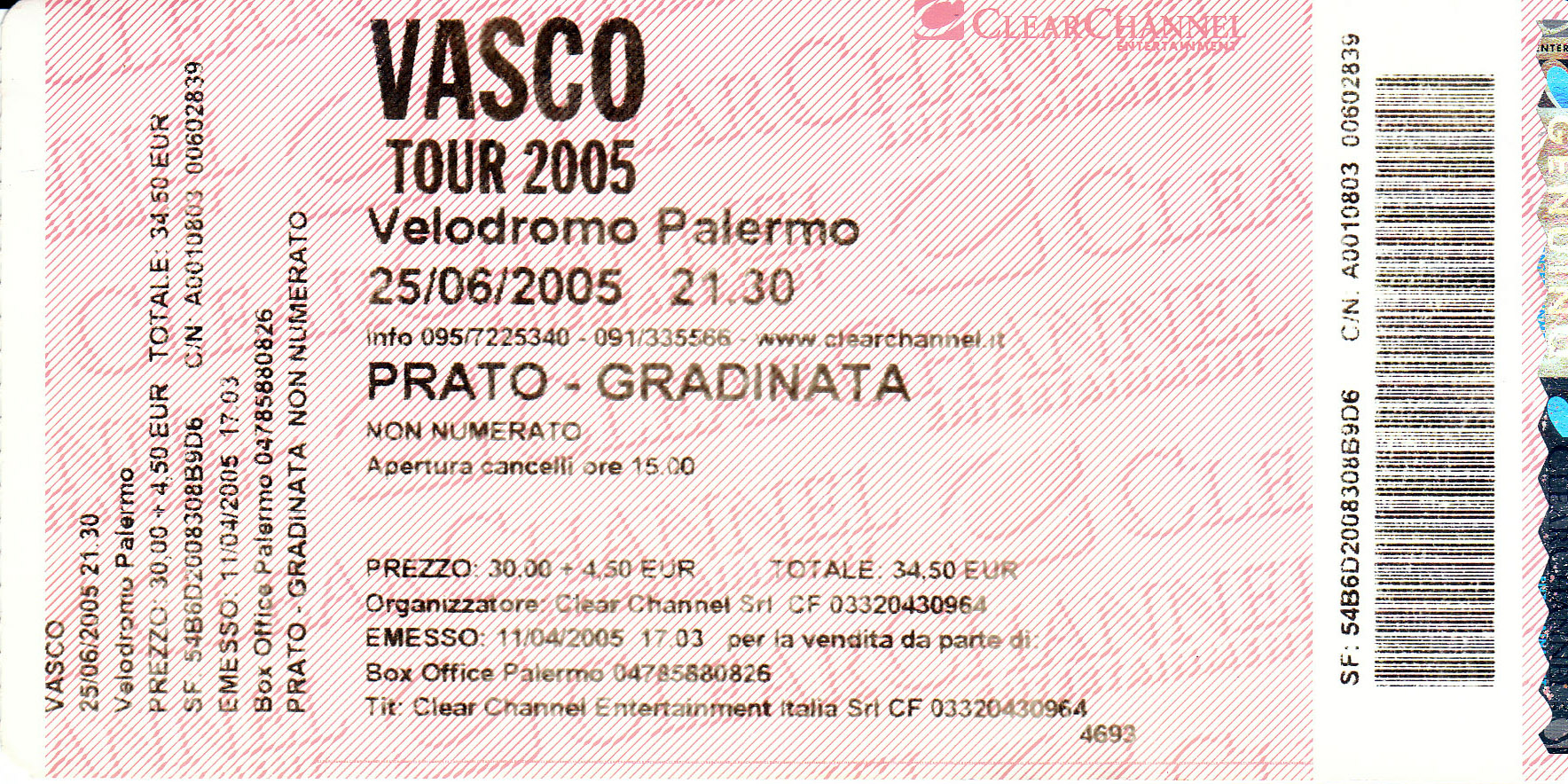
General admission ticket stub for a Vasco Rossi concert at the Velodromo Borsellino in 2005

Because of the unavailability of Palermo's main stadium, Stadio La Favorita, to host open-air concerts, the Velodromo Borsellino was, until 2013, Palermo's primary venue for large concerts. Over the years, however, neglect by the local council due to lack of finances, as well as vandalism, have made this venue unsafe for public events.

During its days as a concert venue, the Velodromo Borsellino had a maximum capacity of 30,000, including general admission on the field.

== See also ==
- List of cycling tracks and velodromes

Preceded by Vikingskipet Olympic Arena; Hamar	UCI Track Cycling World Championships; Venue; 1994	Succeeded by Velódromo Luis Carlos Galán; Bogotá
