= Christian Langella =

Italian footballer (born 2000)

Personal information
- Date of birth: 7 April 2000 (age 26)
- Place of birth: Livorno, Italy
- Height: 1.78 m (5 ft 10 in)
- Position: Midfielder

Team information
- Current team: Perugia
- Number: 33

Youth career
- –2017: Empoli
- 2016–2017: → Lucchese (loan)
- 2017: → Pisa (loan)

Senior career*
Years	Team	Apps	(Gls)
2017–2022	Pisa	1	(0)
2018–2019	→ Bari (loan)	25	(3)
2019–2020	→ Palermo (loan)	24	(3)
2020–2021	→ Renate (loan)	0	(0)
2021–2022	→ Monopoli (loan)	32	(0)
2022–2023	Cerignola	33	(2)
2023–2025	Rimini	69	(1)
2025–2026	Cosenza	34	(2)
2026–	Perugia	2	(0)
- * Club domestic league appearances and goals as of 30 August 2026

Christian Langella (born 7 April 2000) is an Italian professional footballer who plays as a midfielder for Serie C Group B club Perugia.

== Club career ==
Having been part of Pisa youth set-up, he Langella made his debuts in Serie C on the 23 December 2017 in the 2–0 win against Olbia.

Having already been in loan with the S.S.C. Bari for the 2018–19 Serie D, he joined another side from that division the next season: the Palermo, where he impressed and played a central role in Palermo's ascension to Serie C.

On 4 September 2020, he moved on a new loan to Renate.

On 5 August 2021, he went on a new loan to Monopoli.

On 2 August 2022, Langella signed with Cerignola, newly promoted into Serie C.

On 18 August 2023, Langella moved to Rimini on a two-year contract.

== Career statistics ==
=== Club ===
As of 2 June 2021

Appearances and goals by club, season and competition
Club	Season	League			National cup		Other		Total	
Club	Season	Division	Apps	Goals	Apps	Goals	Apps	Goals	Apps	Goals
Pisa	2017–18	Serie C	1	0	0	0	0	0	1	0
Bari (loan)	2018–19	Serie D	25	3	1	0	2	0	28	3
Palermo (loan)	2019–20	Serie D	24	3	1	0	—		25	3
Renate (loan)	2020–21	Serie C	0	0	0	0	0	0	0	0
Monopoli (loan)	2021–22	Serie C	0	0	0	0	—		0	0
Career total			50	6	2	0	2	0	54	6
