= Andrea Tripicchio =

Italian footballer

Personal information
- Date of birth: 10 January 1996 (age 30)
- Place of birth: Cosenza, Italy
- Height: 1.78 m (5 ft 10 in)
- Position: Forward

Team information
- Current team: Castrumfavara

Youth career
- Crotone

Senior career*
Years	Team	Apps	(Gls)
2013–2019	Crotone	2	(0)
2016–2017	→ Reggina (loan)	11	(2)
2017–2018	→ Casertana (loan)	14	(0)
2019–2020	Cittanovese	25	(10)
2020–2021	Gladiator	11	(0)
2021	Città di Sant'Agata	18	(4)
2021–2022	Castrovillari	36	(12)
2022	Grosseto	17	(2)
2022–2023	Afragolese	17	(2)
2023–2024	San Marzano	5	(0)
2024	Acireale	5	(1)
2024–2025	Afragolese		
2025–	Castrumfavara	16	(3)
- * Club domestic league appearances and goals as of 18 January 2026

Andrea Tripicchio (born 10 January 1996) is an Italian professional footballer who plays as a forward for Serie D club Castrumfavara.

== Club career ==
=== Crotone ===
Born in Cosenza, Tripicchio finished his graduation in Crotone's youth system, and made his first-team debut on 24 August 2013, coming on as a late substitute in a 2–5 loss at Siena. On 17 January 2014 he signed a professional deal, running until 2017.

==== Loan to Reggina ====
On 11 August 2016, Tripicchio was signed by Serie C side Reggina on a season-long loan deal. On 20 November, Tripicchio made his Serie C debut for Reggina in a 2–2 home draw against Taranto, he scored his first professional goal in the 48th minute and he was replaced by Fabio Oggiano in the 86th minute. On 27 November he played his first entire match for Reggina, a 1–1 away draw against Catanzaro. On 7 May 2017 he scored his second goal, as a substitute, in the 86th minute of a 4–3 home win over Paganese. Tripicchio ended his loan to Reggiana with 11 appearances, 2 goals and 1 assist.

==== Loan to Casertana ====
On 20 July 2017, Tripicchio was loaned to Serie C club Casertana on a season-long loan. On 30 July he made his debut for Casertana in a 2–0 away defeat against Matera in the first round of Coppa Italia, he played the entire match. On 26 August, Tripicchio made his Serie C debut for Casertana as a substitute replacing Ivan Rajcic in the 74th minute of a 2–1 away defeat against Catanzaro. Tripicchio ended his season-long loan to Casertana with 15 appearances, 14 as a substitute.

=== Cittanovese ===
On 12 August 2019, Tripicchi joined to Serie D club Cittanovese on a free-transfer.

== Career statistics ==
=== Club ===
As of 5 July 2018

Club	Season	League			Cup		Europe		Other		Total	
Club	Season	League	Apps	Goals	Apps	Goals	Apps	Goals	Apps	Goals	Apps	Goals
Crotone	2013–14	Serie B	2	0	0	0	—		—		2	0
Crotone	2014–15	Serie B	0	0	0	0	—		—		0	0
Crotone	2015–16	Serie B	0	0	0	0	—		—		0	0
Reggina (loan)	2016–17	Serie C	11	2	0	0	—		—		11	2
Casertana (loan)	2017–18	Serie C	14	0	1	0	—		—		15	0
Career total			27	2	1	0	—		—		28	2
