= Masimiliano Doda =

Albanian football player

Personal information
- Date of birth: 17 November 2000 (age 25)
- Place of birth: Mirditë, Albania
- Height: 1.80 m (5 ft 11 in)
- Position: Right back

Team information
- Current team: Dukla Prague
- Number: 4

Youth career
- –2019: Sampdoria

Senior career*
Years	Team	Apps	(Gls)
2019–2024	Palermo	41	(1)
2023	→ Imolese (loan)	2	(0)
2024–	Dukla Prague	13	(1)
- * Club domestic league appearances and goals as of 17 June 2025

Masimiliano Doda (born 17 November 2000) is an Albanian professional footballer who plays as a right-back for Dukla Prague.

== Club career ==
A Sampdoria youth product, Doda was released from the Blucerchiati in 2019 without making a senior appearance. He successively signed for the then-Serie D club Palermo on a free transfer, being part of the Rosanero in their first season following the club's bankruptcy of June 2019.

After playing 21 games in the 2019–20 Serie D season that was cut short due to the COVID-19 pandemic in Italy, he signed a three-year professional contract with Palermo in July 2020 following the club's promotion to Serie C.

On 17 January 2023, after making no appearances for the Rosanero in the first half of the 2022–23 Serie B campaign, Doda was loaned out to Serie C side Imolese until the end of the season. He returned to Palermo by the end of the season and was excluded from the first team for the remainder of his contract, only making some spare appearances for the Under-19 team before its expiration on 30 June 2024.

On 17 July 2024, Doda signed a one-year deal with Dukla Prague with a contract extension option.

== International career ==
Doda is a youth international for Albania. He received his first call-up for the Albania U21 national team in June 2021.

== Personal life ==
Doda is the son of an Albanian former football defender who successively relocated to Genoa for work with his family. He has a younger brother, Armelo, who was a youth player for Sampdoria.

== Career statistics ==
=== Club ===
As of 1 September 2022

Appearances and goals by club, season and competition
Club	Season	League			National cup		Other		Total	
Club	Season	Division	Apps	Goals	Apps	Goals	Apps	Goals	Apps	Goals
Palermo	2019–20	Serie D	21	1	1	0	—		22	1
Palermo	2020–21	Serie C	8	0	—		4 (Note: All appearance(s) in promotion play-offs.)	0	12	0
Palermo	2021–22	Serie C	12	0	1	0	—		13	0
Palermo	2022–23	Serie B	0	0	1	0	—		1	0
Total			41	1	3	0	4	0	48	1
Career total			41	1	3	0	4	0	48	1
