= Andrea Silipo =

Italian football player (born 2001)

Personal information
- Date of birth: 17 April 2001 (age 25)
- Place of birth: Rome, Italy
- Height: 1.70 m (5 ft 7 in)
- Position: Right winger

Team information
- Current team: Ascoli
- Number: 7

Youth career
- –2019: Roma

Senior career*
Years	Team	Apps	(Gls)
2019–2020	Roma	0	(0)
2020	→ Palermo (loan)	9	(2)
2020–2023	Palermo	42	(3)
2022–2023	→ Juve Stabia (loan)	29	(5)
2023–2024	Monterosi	31	(3)
2024–	Ascoli	73	(8)
- * Club domestic league appearances and goals as of 20 September 2026

Andrea Silipo (born 17 April 2001) is an Italian professional footballer who plays as a right winger for Serie B club Ascoli.

== Club career ==
A Roma youth product, he was signed on loan by then-Serie D club Palermo on 30 December 2019, effective from the January 2020 transfer window.

Silipo consistently played in the second half of the 2019–20 Serie D season that was cut short due to the COVID-19 pandemic in Italy, with his performances leading Palermo to sign him permanently following the club's promotion to Serie C; he signed a four-year deal, with an option for Roma to buy him back within two years.

On 26 August 2022, after two Serie C campaigns which saw him primarily used as a backup, Silipo was loaned out to Serie C club Juve Stabia.

On 11 August 2023, Palermo announced the sale of Silipo to Serie C club Monterosi on a permanent transfer.

After a season with Monterosi that eventually ended with relegation, Silipo was signed by newly-relegated Serie C club Ascoli on 6 August 2024.

== Career statistics ==
=== Club ===
As of 12 June 2022

Appearances and goals by club, season and competition
Club	Season	League			National cup		Other		Total	
Club	Season	Division	Apps	Goals	Apps	Goals	Apps	Goals	Apps	Goals
Palermo	2019–20 (loan)	Serie D	9	2	0	0	—		9	2
Palermo	2020–21	Serie C	21	1	—		4 (Note: All appearance(s) in promotion play-offs.)	0	25	1
Palermo	2021–22	Serie C	21	2	3	0	4	0	28	2
Palermo	Total		51	5	3	0	8	0	62	5
Career total			51	5	3	0	8	0	62	5
