= Edoardo Lancini =

Italian footballer (born 1994)

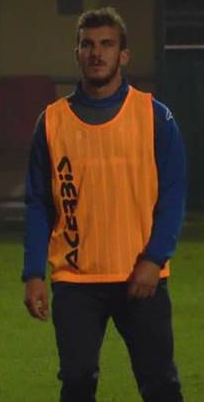

Personal information
- Date of birth: 10 April 1994 (age 32)
- Place of birth: Chiari, Italy
- Height: 1.88 m (6 ft 2 in)
- Position: Centre back

Team information
- Current team: Reggina
- Number: 79

Youth career
- –2014: Brescia

Senior career*
Years	Team	Apps	(Gls)
2014–2019	Brescia	65	(1)
2017	→ Novara (loan)	13	(1)
2019–2023	Palermo	76	(4)
2023–2024	Virtus Entella	6	(0)
2024–2025	Novara	27	(1)
2025	Pescara	8	(2)
2025–2026	Campobasso	28	(2)
2026–	Reggina	0	(0)
- * Club domestic league appearances and goals as of 30 April 2026

Edoardo Lancini (born 10 April 1994) is an Italian footballer who plays as a centre back for Serie D club Reggina.

== Club career ==
Lancini is a youth exponent from Brescia Calcio. He made his debut on 10 May 2014 against Reggina Calcio in a Serie B game. He came in as a 33rd-minute substitute for Valerio Di Cesare in a 0–1 away win.

He joined Palermo in August 2019, being part of the squad that won promotion from Serie D to Serie C in 2020, and then to Serie B in 2022. After a single Serie B season with scarce appearances in the first team, Lancini left Palermo in June 2023 and was subsequently signed by Serie C club Virtus Entella.

== Career statistics ==
=== Club ===
As of 1 September 2022

Appearances and goals by club, season and competition
Club	Season	League			National cup		Other		Total	
Club	Season	Division	Apps	Goals	Apps	Goals	Apps	Goals	Apps	Goals
Brescia	2013–14	Serie B	2	0	0	0	—		2	0
Brescia	2014–15	Serie B	11	0	0	0	—		11	0
Brescia	2015–16	Serie B	23	1	0	0	—		23	1
Brescia	2016–17	Serie B	9	0	0	0	—		9	0
Brescia	2017–18	Serie B	17	0	1	0	—		18	0
Brescia	2018–19	Serie B	3	0	2	0	—		5	0
Brescia	Total		65	1	3	0	0	0	68	1
Novara (loan)	2016–17	Serie B	13	1	0	0	—		13	1
Palermo	2019–20	Serie D	23	2	1	0	—		24	2
Palermo	2020–21	Serie C	13	1	—		4 (Note: All appearance(s) in promotion play-offs.)	0	17	1
Palermo	2021–22	Serie C	26	1	2	1	7	0	35	2
Palermo	2022–23	Serie B	2	0	1	0	—		3	0
Palermo	Total		64	4	4	1	11	0	79	5
Career total			142	6	7	1	11	0	160	7
