= Ezequiel Melillo (footballer, born 1993) =

Argentine professional footballer

Personal information
- Full name: Ezequiel Alejandro Melillo
- Date of birth: 5 August 1993 (age 33)
- Place of birth: San Isidro, Argentina
- Height: 1.76 m (5 ft 9 in)
- Position: Attacking midfielder

Team information
- Current team: Fasano

Youth career
- Boca Juniors
- 2004–2005: River Plate
- Tigre

Senior career*
Years	Team	Apps	(Gls)
- San Basilio Palestrina
2013–2015	Racing Club	3	(0)
2015	→ Unión Mar del Plata (loan)	10	(0)
2016–2018	Troina	32	(10)
2018–2019	Vibonese	28	(0)
2019–2020	FC Messina	10	(0)
2020	Savoia	4	(0)
2021	Fasano	18	(5)
2021–2023	Francavilla	61	(12)
2023	Nardò	4	(0)
2023	San Marzano	8	(0)
2023–	Fasano	1	(0)
- * Club domestic league appearances and goals as of 7 January 2024

Ezequiel Alejandro Melillo (born 5 August 1993) is an Argentine professional footballer who plays as an attacking midfielder for Italian Serie D club Fasano.

== Career ==
Melillo played for the youth system of Boca Juniors, before spending time with the academies of River Plate and Tigre. Melillo applied for Italian citizenship at the age of fifteen, while playing five-a-side football in Bari. He went back to Argentina months later, but returned to Italy after agreeing terms of San Basilio Palestrina. He won promotion from the Eccellenza in his time there, as he also had a trial at Napoli. A return to his homeland came again, as the midfielder played for Racing Club of the Primera División from 2013. Appearances in the 2013–14 campaign against Colón, Estudiantes and Godoy Cruz came.

In 2015, Melillo was loaned to Primera B Nacional's Unión Mar del Plata. Ten matches followed as they suffered relegation, he was notably sent off during his final encounter on 8 November 2015 versus Guillermo Brown. 2016 saw Melillo sign for Eccellenza Sicily side Troina. They, in 2016–17, won a place in the 2017–18 Serie D; where he appeared fifteen times and scored once. On 27 July 2018, Serie C outfit Vibonese signed Melillo. His opening appearances arrived in the succeeding September in fixtures with Bisceglie, Trapani and Catanzaro. Ahead of 2019–20, Melillo joined FC Messina of Serie D.

After ten appearances for Messina, Melillo headed across Serie D to Savoia; who he'd appear three times for. In February 2021, Melillo joined league rivals Fasano.

== Personal life ==
Melillo was born in Argentina, though his father was born in Salerno, Italy.

== Career statistics ==
As of 6 February 2021.

Appearances and goals by club, season and competition
Club	Season	League			Cup		League Cup		Continental		Other		Total	
Club	Season	Division	Apps	Goals	Apps	Goals	Apps	Goals	Apps	Goals	Apps	Goals	Apps	Goals
Racing Club	2013–14	Primera División	3	0	0	0	—		0	0	0	0	3	0
Racing Club	2014	Primera División	0	0	0	0	—		—		0	0	0	0
Racing Club	2015	Primera División	0	0	0	0	—		0	0	0	0	0	0
Racing Club	Total		3	0	0	0	—		0	0	0	0	3	0
Unión Mar del Plata (loan)	2015	Primera B Nacional	10	0	0	0	—		—		0	0	10	0
Troina	2016–17	Eccellenza Sicily	19	9	0	0	0	0	—		0	0	19	9
Troina	2017–18	Serie D	13	1	0	0	0	0	—		0	0	13	1
Troina	Total		42	10	0	0	—		0	0	0	0	45	10
Vibonese	2018–19	Serie C	28	0	0	0	0	0	—		0	0	28	0
FC Messina	2019–20	Serie D	10	0	0	0	0	0	—		0	0	10	0
Savoia	2020–21	Serie D	3	0	0	0	0	0	—		0	0	3	0
Fasano	2020–21	Serie D	7	3	0	0	0	0	—		0	0	7	3
Career total			48	3	0	0	0	0	0	0	0	0	98	13
