= Erdis Kraja =

Italian-born Albanian footballer (born 2000)

Personal information
- Date of birth: 7 July 2000 (age 26)
- Place of birth: Chiari, Italy
- Height: 1.82 m (6 ft 0 in)
- Position: Midfielder

Team information
- Current team: Pescara

Youth career
- Atalanta

Senior career*
Years	Team	Apps	(Gls)
2019–2025	Atalanta	0	(0)
2019–2020	→ Palermo (loan)	21	(3)
2020–2021	→ Grosseto (loan)	32	(0)
2021–2022	→ Lecco (loan)	33	(3)
2022–2023	→ Pescara (loan)	29	(1)
2023–2024	→ Ascoli (loan)	5	(0)
2024–2025	Atalanta U23	5	(1)
2025–	Pescara	9	(0)
2026	→ Pineto (loan)	8	(0)

International career^{‡}
2016	Albania U17	3	(0)
2020–2022	Albania U21	5	(0)
- * Club domestic league appearances and goals as of 30 April 2026 ‡ National team caps and goals as of 13 June 2022

Erdis Kraja (born 7 July 2000) is a professional footballer who plays as a midfielder for Serie C Group B club Pescara. Born in Italy, Kraja represents Albania at international level.

== Club career ==
On 12 September 2020, he joined Serie C club Grosseto on loan.

On 27 July 2021, he was loaned to Serie C club Lecco.

On 4 August 2022, Kraja moved on a new loan to Pescara.

On 20 July 2023, Kraja moved on a new loan to Ascoli.

On 28 January 2025, Kraja returned to Pescara on a permanent basis.

== International career ==
Kraja represents Albania at international youth level.

== Career statistics ==
=== Club ===
As of 19 May 2021

Appearances and goals by club, season and competition
Club	Season	League			National cup		Other		Total	
Club	Season	Division	Apps	Goals	Apps	Goals	Apps	Goals	Apps	Goals
Palermo (loan)	2019–20	Serie D	21	3	0	0	—		21	3
Grosseto (loan)	2020–21	Serie C	32	0	—		2 (Note: All appearance(s) in promotion play-offs.)	0	34	0
Lecco (loan)	2021–22	Serie C	31	3	0	0	1 (Note: All appearance(s) in Serie C Cup.)	0	32	3
Career total			84	6	0	0	3	0	87	6
