= Mario Santana =

Argentine footballer

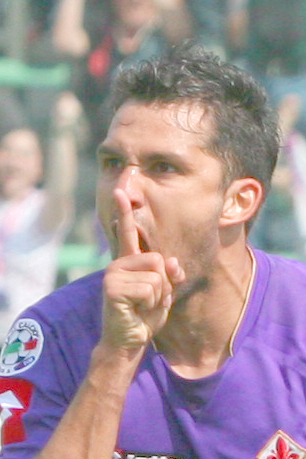
- Santana playing for Fiorentina in 2008

Personal information
- Full name: Mario Alberto Santana
- Date of birth: 23 December 1981 (age 44)
- Place of birth: Comodoro Rivadavia, Argentina
- Height: 1.80 m (5 ft 11 in)
- Position: Winger

Senior career*
Years	Team	Apps	(Gls)
1999–2001	San Lorenzo	33	(2)
2002	Venezia	4	(0)
2002–2006	Palermo	91	(4)
2003–2004	→ Chievo (loan)	28	(3)
2006–2011	Fiorentina	108	(15)
2011–2013	Napoli	8	(0)
2012	→ Cesena (loan)	16	(3)
2012–2013	→ Torino (loan)	27	(4)
2013–2016	Genoa	6	(0)
2014	→ Olhanense (loan)	3	(0)
2015	→ Frosinone (loan)	12	(1)
2016–2019	Pro Patria	99	(32)
2019–2021	Palermo	32	(5)
2023	Athletic Club Palermo	5	(0)

International career
2004–2005	Argentina	7	(1)

Managerial career
- 2026–: Palermo Calcio Popolare
- * Club domestic league appearances and goals as of 26 May 2021

Mario Alberto Santana (born 23 December 1981) is an Argentine football coach and former professional player, in the role of winger, currently working as the head coach of amateur club Palermo Calcio Popolare.

== Club career ==
=== Early career ===
Santana started his career in his native country with San Lorenzo. After his contract with San Lorenzo expired, he decided to try his luck in European football, moving to Italy in January 2002 for Serie A team Venezia, then relegated at the end of the season. He then followed his chairman Maurizio Zamparini to Serie B team Palermo, where he showed high qualities in his role.

In 2003, he was then loaned to Serie A side A.C. ChievoVerona (along with Stefano Morrone with Eugenio Corini moved to opposite direction), becoming one of the most interesting wingers in the Italian top division, and being first capped for the Argentina national football team in a friendly match against Japan on 18 August 2004. He then returned to Palermo, which was just promoted to Serie A at the time, for the following season.

=== Fiorentina ===
In May 2006, he was signed by la viola for €6.5 million (€5 million plus 50% of Parravicini) to prepare for 2006–07 UEFA Champions League 3rd qualifying round. But due to 2006 Serie A scandal, Fiorentina finished 9th and did not qualify for any European competitions.

In the 2009–10 season, La Viola signed Marco Marchionni, making Santana first became a backup player, likes the first group stage of 2009–10 UEFA Champions League match against Lyon, substituted Marchionni in the 72 minutes. He started the third group stage match, as Marchionni was rested. In the 4th match, he lost his starting place again to Marchionni. He substituted Juan Vargas in the 77th minute of that match. In the last two matches of the group stage, Santana played a new role as an attacking midfielder as Adrian Mutu was rested.

In the league, Santana was moved to left midfield position (rotated with Vargas), attacking midfielder, second striker (when Mutu was unavailable and later the coach preferred Jovetić) or right midfielder when Marchionni was rested.

Santana initially had a better chance to play after Martin Jørgensen left in January 2010.

On 14 February 2010, Santana was injured on the league match against Sampdoria, missed the Champions League match against Bayern Munich.

In April 2010, Santana was injured and expected to be out for 5 months after clash with opponent goalkeeper in a club friendly against San Miniato Basso.

=== Napoli and loans to Cesena and Torino ===
On 12 July 2011, Santana finally agreed to sign with Napoli over Cesena, leaving Fiorentina after five years. He moved on loan to A.C. Cesena on 31 January 2012.

On 12 July 2012, Santana was loaned out to newly promoted Torino F.C. for the 2012–2013 Serie A campaign.

=== Genoa, later years and return to Palermo ===
On 19 July 2013, Santana completed a move from Napoli to Genoa. In the January 2014 transfer window, he left Italy after 12 years competing in Serie A, signing a loan deal with Olhanense in Portugal.

He left Frosinone in January 2016 to sign a permanent deal with Lega Pro club Pro Patria, staying at the club also after the club's relegation to Serie D the following season. On 22 June 2018, after Pro Patria won the Serie D title, he signed a contract extension until 2019. He left Pro Patria by the end of the 2018–19 season.

In August 2019, he became the first signing of the refounded Palermo, who will restart from Serie D, thus marking his return with the Rosanero after thirteen years. He was also named team captain for the club's 2019–20 season.

On 27 September 2020, following his appearance in Palermo's first game of the 2020–21 Serie C season against Teramo, Santana became the first player in the club's history to have played in four different leagues (from Serie A to Serie D). A month later, he was sidelined after having contracted COVID-19.

On 3 March 2021, he scored the winning goal in a 1–0 away win at Catania in the Sicilian derby, which also was his first goal of the season; with this goal, he also became the first player to have ever scored at least one goal in the top four Italian divisions for Palermo.

On 14 July 2023, after two years in a coaching capacity at Palermo, Santana returned to active football as a player for Eccellenza Sicily club Athletic Club Palermo. He left the club just four months later, after appearing sparingly with the first team. In January 2024, he switched to futsal, joining Serie A2 team Palermo C5.

== Coaching career ==
On 18 June 2021, Palermo announced Santana's retirement from active football, and his subsequent appointment as a youth team coach. On 16 January 2022, new Palermo first team head coach Silvio Baldini announced Santana will be part of his coaching staff until the end of the season. Following Baldini's departure and the hiring of Eugenio Corini (a former Palermo captain during Santana's first period with the Rosanero) as new head coach, Santana was confirmed as a first-team technical collaborator.

On 20 February 2026, Santana was unveiled as the new head coach of Palermo-based amateur Prima Categoria team Palermo Calcio Popolare.

== International career ==
He also played for Argentina at the Confederations Cup 2005 and has been frequently capped for the 2006 World Cup qualification matches.

== Personal life ==
Santana acquired his Italian nationality through marriage to his first wife, Italian-Argentinian volleyball player Antonella Moltrasio. His nationality was granted in February 2008. He had two children from his first marriage. He successively remarried with a woman from Palermo, with whom he had two more children.

== Career statistics ==
=== Club ===
As of 26 May 2021

Appearances and goals by club, season and competition
Club	Season	League			National cup		Continental		Other		Total	
Club	Season	Division	Apps	Goals	Apps	Goals	Apps	Goals	Apps	Goals	Apps	Goals
San Lorenzo	1999–2000	Primera División	4	1	—		—		—		4	1
San Lorenzo	2000–01	Primera División	17	1	—		?+3	?+0	—		20+	1+
San Lorenzo	2001–02	Primera División	12	0	—		?	?	—		12+	0+
San Lorenzo	Total		33	2	0	0	14	1	0	0	47	3
Venezia	2001–02	Serie A	4	0	0	0	—		—		4	0
Palermo	2002–03	Serie B	33	1	0	0	—		—		33	1
Palermo	2004–05	Serie A	30	3	3	0	—		—		33	3
Palermo	2005–06	Serie A	28	0	3	0	9 (Note: All appearance(s) in UEFA Cup.)	1	—		40	1
ChievoVerona (loan)	2003–04	Serie A	28	3	1	0	—		—		29	3
Fiorentina	2006–07	Serie A	8	1	1	1	—		—		9	2
Fiorentina	2007–08	Serie A	26	6	0	0	8	0	—		34	6
Fiorentina	2008–09	Serie A	20	1	1	0	8 (Note: All appearance(s) in UEFA Champions League.)	0	—		29	1
Fiorentina	2009–10	Serie A	26	3	4	0	5	1	—		35	4
Fiorentina	2010–11	Serie A	28	4	2	1	—		—		30	5
Fiorentina	Total		108	15	8	2	21	1	0	0	137	18
Napoli	2011–12	Serie A	8	0	0	0	3	0	—		11	0
Cesena (loan)	2011–12	Serie A	16	3	0	0	—		—		16	3
Torino (loan)	2012–13	Serie A	27	4	1	0	—		—		28	4
Genoa	2013–14	Serie A	6	0	1	0	—		—		7	0
Olhanense (loan)	2013–14	Primeira Liga	3	0	0	0	—		—		3	0
Frosinone (loan)	2014–15	Serie B	12	1	0	0	—		—		12	1
Pro Patria	2015–16	Lega Pro	16	3	—		—		—		16	3
Pro Patria	2016–17	Serie D	28	12	2	0	—		0	0	30	12
Pro Patria	2017–18	Serie D	27	15	1	0	—		3	1	31	16
Pro Patria	2018–19	Serie C	28	2	2	1	—		1 (Note: All appearance(s) in promotion play-offs.)	0	31	3
Pro Patria	Total		99	32	5	1	0	0	4	1	108	34
Palermo	2019–20	Serie D	12	3	1	1	—		—		13	4
Palermo	2020–21	Serie C	20	2	—		—		4	0	24	2
Palermo	Palermo total		123	9	7	1	9	1	4	0	143	11
Career total			467	69	23	4	47	3	8	1	545	77

=== International goals ===
No.	Date	Venue	Opponent	Score	Result	Competition	Ref.
1	18 August 2004	Shizuoka Stadium, Fukuroi Japan	Japan	1–2	1–2	Friendly	
