= Ferdinando Sforzini =

Italian footballer (born 1984)

Personal information
- Date of birth: 4 December 1984 (age 41)
- Place of birth: Tivoli, Italy
- Height: 1.94 m (6 ft 4 1/2 in)
- Position: Forward

Youth career
- 2001–2003: Napoli
- 2002–2003: → Lazio (loan)

Senior career*
Years	Team	Apps	(Gls)
2003–2005	Sassuolo	38	(9)
2005–2011	Udinese	0	(0)
2005–2006	→ Verona (loan)	35	(5)
2006–2007	→ Modena (loan)	30	(5)
2007–2008	→ Vicenza (loan)	14	(2)
2008	→ Ravenna (loan)	21	(9)
2008–2009	→ Grosseto (loan)	18	(3)
2009	→ Avellino (loan)	12	(7)
2009–2010	→ Bari (loan)	8	(0)
2010–2011	→ CFR Cluj (loan)	3	(0)
2011	→ Grosseto (loan)	20	(8)
2011–2013	Grosseto	58	(30)
2013–2014	Pescara	30	(2)
2014–2015	Latina	20	(4)
2015	Entella	19	(6)
2016	Pavia	11	(3)
2016–2018	Viterbese Castrense	9	(1)
2018–2019	Avellino	29	(11)
2019	Cavese	1	(0)
2019–2020	Palermo	14	(5)
2020–2021	Campobasso	6	(1)
2021–2022	Grosseto	0	(0)
Total		396	(111)
- * Club domestic league appearances and goals

Ferdinando Sforzini (born 4 December 1984), commonly known by the nickname Nandogoal, is an Italian former professional footballer who plays as a forward.

== Career ==
=== Early career ===
A tall forward, Sforzini started his career off with the youth system of Napoli and was loaned out to Lazio from Napoli's youth system in 2002.

Ferdinando Sforzini graduated from Lazio youth system in 2003 and immediately sold, to Sassuolo.

At Sassuolo he impressed, scoring 10 goals in 29 appearances in 2004–05 Serie C2 season.

=== Udinese ===
After impressing with U.S. Sassuolo Calcio, he was transferred to Serie A club Udinese Calcio in June 2005.

Ferdinandos Sforzini remained at Udine for 2 months, but loaned out to Serie B side Verona in order to gain more experience in August 2005. In his season with Verona, Ferdinando Sforzini managed 5 goals in 35 Serie B appearances, which mainly as a substitutes player, but also made 16 league starts.

For the 2006–2007 season, Udinese opted to again loan out the player in July 2006, however this time, it was to Modena, another Serie B club. With Modena, Ferdinandos Sforzini scored 5 goals again, in 30 league appearances (started 17 times). On 1 July 2006 Sforzini returned to Udinese, however, he again was loaned out soon later.

In July 2007, Ferdinandos Sforzini transferred to Vicenza for yet another Serie B season. With the club, Ferdinandos Sforzini made 14 league appearances (half of them as starting XI) in his six-month stay, scoring 2 goals. For the second half of the 2007–2008 season, Udinese loaned out the 23-year-old Sforzini to Ravenna, a club struggling to avoid relegation from the Serie B. In the latter half of the season, Ferdinandos Sforzini scored an impressive 9 goals in 21 league appearances for Ravenna Calcio, but it was not enough to save them from relegation.

Ferdinandos Sforzini was again loaned out into the Serie B – this time with Grosseto. In his six-month loan period with Grosseto, Sforzini was a regular starter at the start of season, appearing 18 times (10 of them as starter) and scoring 3 goals in Serie B. In January 2009, he swapped places with Alessandro Pellicori of Avellino. With relegation frightening Avellino Sforzini impressed, hitting good form and scoring 7 goals in just 12 Serie B appearances.

After hitting good form with Avellino, Sforzini returned to Udinese on 1 July 2009, and received the call-up to the pre-season camp. But he was loaned out again, this time to Serie B champion A.S. Bari, the Serie A newcomer. He was the starting forward along with Vitaly Kutuzov in the opening match of Serie A, a shocking 1–1 draw with defending champion Internazionale. But in the next Serie A match the coach Giampiero Ventura preferred Riccardo Meggiorini as starting forward to partner with Kutuzov.

Sforzini was further hit by left leg injury soon after, At first he would be rested a month but hit by flu in November. Sforzini then trained separately for ongoing injury.

After Kutuzov's out of season injury, Bari signed José Ignacio Castillo, and Sforzini was call-up by Ventura several time to as an extra cover for their starting forwards Barreto, Meggiorini and Castillo. He played his return match on 30 January 2010, substituted Castillo at the second half. He made a further 5 Serie A appearances as substitute.

On 1 July 2010, Sforzini returned to Udinese again, and played for Udinese B team (composite of players that pending loan) in pre-season friendlies.

=== CFR Cluj loan ===
On 25 August 2010, he was loaned to Romanian side CFR Cluj. He made his debut in Liga I 10 September 2010 against Rapid București in a 2–0 defeat, replacing Cristian Bud eight minutes from the end of the game. On 15 September made his debut in the Champions League in Cluj- Basel (2-1), replacing Lacina Traoré as a substitute

Scored the first goal for Cluj on 27 October 2010 won the encounter against the Targu Mures (2-0 final), valid for the knockout stages of the Cupa României. However, after the sacking of Italian manager Andrea Mandorlini in September 2010, Sforzini lost his place in the side and he returned to Udinese Calcio at the start of the January window.

During the 2011 January winter transfer market he was transferred to Italian Serie B team U.S. Grosseto on loan with option to sign permanently.

=== Grosseto ===
After scoring 8 goals in 20 games on loan at U.S. Grosseto in Serie B, Sforzini's move was made permanent leaving Udinese Calcio after a 6-year spell at the club. His form in his 2 seasons in Grosseto was impressive, in his first season he scored 21 goals in 40 appearances in all competitions with 20 of those coming in Serie B in the 2011/12 season. He finished 3rd top scorer in Serie B behind Ciro Immobile (28 goals for Pescara) and Marco Sau (21 goals for Juve Stabia).

On 10 August 2012, Grosseto were provisionally relegated, by the Disciplinary Commission set up for Scommessopoli scandal investigations, to Lega Pro Prima Divisione because of their involvement in Scommessopoli scandal. Furthermore, the president of Grosseto was at the time suspended from all football activities for five years.

However, on 22 August 2012, Grosseto and its president were acquitted by the Court of justice, eliminating the verdict of the first instance and so re-instated back to Serie B for the following 2012/13 season.

His start to the 2012/13 season saw him score 11 goals in his first 21 Serie B appearances before his form attracted interest of Serie A club Pescara in the January transfer window.

=== Pescara ===
On 31 January 2013, Sforzini transferred to Serie A side Pescara for €400,000 plus Grosseto received Gastón Brugman and Danilo Soddimo on season long loan's from Pescara as part of the transfer.

In his first half season he made 10 appearances im Serie A, without scoring a goal. He could not help Pescara escape from relegation to Serie B. During the 2013–14 season, Sforzini scored just 2 goals in 20 Serie B games.

=== Latina ===
On 1 September 2014 he was signed by fellow Serie B club U.S. Latina Calcio.

=== Entella ===
On 2 February 2015 he was swapped with Gianluca Litteri of Entella.

=== Later career ===
In 2018–19, he was a regular for Avellino, guiding the team to win the Serie D title.

After a mere ten days with Serie C club Cavese in August 2019, he rescinded on 30 August 2019 and joined Serie D club Palermo two weeks later.

On 9 September 2020 he joined Serie D club Campobasso.

== Career statistics ==
=== Club ===
As of 23 January 2021

Appearances and goals by club, season and competition
Club	Season	League			National cup		Continental		Other		Total	
Club	Season	Division	Apps	Goals	Apps	Goals	Apps	Goals	Apps	Goals	Apps	Goals
Sassuolo	2003–04	Serie C2	9	0	4 (Note: All appearance(s) in Coppa Italia Serie C.)	0	—		1 (Note: All appearance(s) in relegation play-outs.)	0	14	0
Sassuolo	2004–05	Serie C2	29	9	4	0	—		2 (Note: All appearance(s) in promotion play-offs.)	0	35	9
Sassuolo	Total		38	9	8	0	0	0	3	0	49	9
Hellas Verona (loan)	2005–06	Serie B	35	5	0	0	—		—		35	5
Modena (loan)	2006–07	Serie B	30	5	3	0	—		—		33	5
Vicenza (loan)	2007–08	Serie B	14	2	2	0	—		—		16	2
Ravenna (loan)	2007–08	Serie B	21	9	0	0	—		—		21	9
Grosseto (loan)	2008–09	Serie B	18	3	2	2	—		0	0	20	5
Avellino (loan)	2008–09	Serie B	12	7	0	0	—		—		12	7
Bari (loan)	2009–10	Serie A	8	0	1	0	—		—		9	0
Cluj (loan)	2010–11	Liga I	3	0	2	1	2	0	0	0	7	1
Grosseto	2010–11 (loan)	Serie B	20	8	0	0	—		—		20	8
Grosseto	2011–12	Serie B	38	20	2	1	—		—		40	21
Grosseto	2012–13	Serie B	20	10	1	1	—		—		21	11
Grosseto	Grosseto total		96	41	5	4	0	0	0	0	101	45
Pescara	2012–13	Serie A	10	0	0	0	—		—		10	0
Pescara	2013–14	Serie B	20	2	1	0	—		—		21	2
Pescara	Total		30	2	1	0	0	0	0	0	31	2
Latina	2014–15	Serie B	20	4	0	0	—		—		20	4
Virtus Entella	2014–15	Serie B	15	6	0	0	—		2	0	17	6
Virtus Entella	2015–16	Serie B	4	0	0	0	—		—		4	0
Virtus Entella	Total		19	6	0	0	0	0	2	0	21	6
Pavia	2015–16	Lega Pro	11	3	0	0	—		—		11	3
Viterbese	2016–17	Lega Pro	9	1	1	1	—		0	0	10	2
Viterbese	2017–18	Serie C	0	0	0	0	—		0	0	0	0
Viterbese	Total		9	1	1	1	0	0	0	0	10	2
Avellino	2018–19	Serie D	29	11	1	0	—		1+3	0	34	11
Avellino	Avellino total		41	18	1	0	0	0	4	0	46	18
Cavese	2019–20	Serie C	1	0	0	0	—		—		1	0
Palermo	2019–20	Serie D	14	5	0	0	—		—		14	5
Campobasso	2020–21	Serie D	6	1	—		—		—		6	1
Career total			396	104	24	6	2	0	9	0	431	117

== Personal career ==
During his stay in Grosseto, Sforzini was given the nickname Nandogoal and also taglia gole [cutthroat], nicknamed for his traditional goal celebration. He is a product of the famous Napoli youth academy.
