= Manuel Peretti =

Italian footballer (born 2000)

Personal information
- Date of birth: 7 March 2000 (age 26)
- Place of birth: Verona, Italy
- Height: 1.92 m (6 ft 4 in)
- Position: Centre-back

Team information
- Current team: Cavese
- Number: 25

Youth career
- –2019: Hellas Verona

Senior career*
Years	Team	Apps	(Gls)
2019–2020	Hellas Verona	0	(0)
2019–2020	→ Palermo (loan)	14	(1)
2020–	Palermo	22	(0)
2022	→ Grosseto (loan)	6	(0)
2023	→ Recanatese (loan)	15	(0)
2023–2024	Recanatese	27	(0)
2024–	Cavese	33	(1)
- * Club domestic league appearances and goals as of 1 May 2026

Manuel Peretti (born 7 March 2000) is an Italian professional footballer who plays as a centre-back for Serie C Group C club Cavese.

== Club career ==
A Hellas Verona youth product, he was signed on loan by then-Serie D side Palermo in August 2019 as one of the first acquisitions by the refounded Rosanero club.

Peretti played 14 games for the Rosanero in the 2019–20 Serie D season that was cut short due to the COVID-19 pandemic in Italy. Palermo successively signed him permanently following the club's promotion to Serie C, with a buy-back option for Hellas Verona.

On 31 January 2022, he was loaned out to Serie C club Grosseto until the end of the 2021–22 season.

On 4 January 2023, he was loaned out to Serie C club Recanatese until the end of the 2022–23 season. He was permanently signed by Recanatese on 12 July 2023.

On 13 August 2024, Peretti joined Cavese.

== Career statistics ==
=== Club ===
As of 31 January 2022

Appearances and goals by club, season and competition
Club	Season	League			National cup		Other		Total	
Club	Season	Division	Apps	Goals	Apps	Goals	Apps	Goals	Apps	Goals
Palermo	2019–20 (loan)	Serie D	14	1	1	0	—		15	1
Palermo	2020–21	Serie C	16	0	—		2 (Note: All appearance(s) in promotion play-offs.)	0	18	0
Palermo	2021–22	Serie C	6	0	0	0	—		1	0
Palermo	Total		36	1	1	0	2	0	39	1
Career total			36	1	1	0	2	0	39	1
