= Ibrahime Mbaye =

Senegalese football player

Personal information
- Date of birth: 30 June 1997 (age 29)
- Place of birth: Thiaroye, Senegal
- Height: 1.92 m (6 ft 4 in)
- Position: Defender

Team information
- Current team: Enna

Youth career
- 2015–2017: Crotone

Senior career*
Years	Team	Apps	(Gls)
2017–2018	Crotone	0	(0)
2017–2018	→ Viterbese (loan)	2	(0)
2018	Lavagnese	0	(0)
2018–2019	Castiadas	5	(0)
2019–2020	Roccella	20	(1)
2020–2021	Troina	27	(1)
2021	Casale	1	(0)
2021–2022	Troina	15	(0)
2022–2023	Locri	28	(1)
2023–2024	Ragusa	27	(0)
2024	Enna	12	(0)
2024–2025	Licata	14	(2)
2025	Modica		
2025–	Enna	9	(0)
- * Club domestic league appearances and goals as of 11 January 2026

Ibrahime Mbaye (born 30 June 1997) is a Senegalese football player who plays for Italian Serie D club Enna.

== Club career ==
He made his Serie C debut for Viterbese on 30 December 2017 in a game against Arzachena.

On 1 October 2018, he joined Serie D club Lavagnese.
