= Stefano Maiorano =

Italian footballer

Personal information
- Date of birth: 30 August 1986 (age 40)
- Place of birth: Campagna, Italy
- Height: 1.83 m (6 ft 0 in)
- Position: Midfielder

Team information
- Current team: Calcio Biancavilla

Senior career*
Years	Team	Apps	(Gls)
2004–2009	Sorrento	105	(4)
2009–2010	Cavese	28	(1)
2010–2011	Forza e Coraggio	20	(0)
2011–2012	Ancona	28	(1)
2012–2014	Messina	46	(1)
2014–2015	Catanzaro	19	(1)
2015–2016	Juve Stabia	22	(0)
2016–2017	Paganese	17	(1)
2017	Taranto	13	(0)
2017	Messina	10	(0)
2018	Audace Cerignola	11	(0)
2018–2019	Latina	24	(1)
2019–	Calcio Biancavilla	22	(0)
- * Club domestic league appearances and goals as of 11 February 2018

Stefano Maiorano (born 30 August 1986, in Campagna) is an Italian football midfielder who currently plays for ASD Calcio Biancavilla.

== Appearances on Italian Series ==
Serie C1 : 47 Apps, 2 Goals

Serie C2 : 20 Apps

Serie D : 38 Apps, 2 Goals

Total : 105 Apps, 4 Goals
