= Frank Balistreri =

American entrepreneur

- Occupation: CEO of iMOS Consulting
- Years active: 1978–present
- Known for: Apple Employee #142; Founder, SigForms; Founder, iMOS Consulting

Frank Balistreri is a Silicon Valley–based entrepreneur and business owner, founder of digital forms company SigForms, and founder and CEO of automotive sales and marketing company iMOS Consulting.

== Career and businesses ==
Balistreri was hired as Apple Employee No. 142 in 1978, working on the Apple II by developing Apple's first service and parts organizations. Balistreri and Burrell Smith, who was then a Service Technician at Apple, designed the first software to track failures and compile service issues on the Apple II. In 1979, Balistreri left to join Moore Business Forms Inc, a provider of various forms for business applications. Balistreri designed hundreds of forms and systems for Moore and their partner ASK Computer Systems. Using his experience from these companies, Balistreri left Moore in 1984 to start his first company, SigForms.

=== SigForms ===
SigForms was a company focused on creating both paper and electronic forms for business and software applications, and Balistreri was successfully able to develop relationships with software giants such as Oracle, Adobe, Lotus, JetForm and StreamServe Inc. By cultivating these relationships Balistreri was able to quickly grow his company, and in 1999 was named Silicon Valley's 9th fastest growing private company. The most notable distribution of SigForms products occurred when their forms were bundled with Lotus Development's cc:Mail 7 (distributed to 13 million users) and with Adobe Exchange (distributed to 3 million users). Both these forms were featured in major PC-related publications (the Lotus forms on the cover of PC Week, the Adobe forms in PC Magazine). This success led to the purchase of SigForms by StreamServe in 1999 (StreamServe was then acquired by Open Text in 2010).

=== iMOS ===
After leaving SigForms in 1999, Balistreri retired for several years. During his retirement, Balistreri started a small business that manufactured and sold two minibike models, The Flee and Jonny Freestyle. In 2003, Balistreri saw a need for professional technical services in the automotive industry, since more customers were using the internet to locate car dealerships. Balistreri left retirement and founded iMOS, a business specializing in designing and maintaining websites for automobile dealerships.
