= Fabio Oggiano =

Italian footballer

Personal information
- Date of birth: 8 July 1987 (age 39)
- Place of birth: Sassari, Italy
- Height: 1.70 m (5 ft 7 in)
- Position: Forward

Team information
- Current team: Ragusa
- Number: 11

Senior career*
Years	Team	Apps	(Gls)
2004–2006	Alghero	15	(3)
2006–2007	Arzachena		
2007–2008	Olmedo		
2008–2012	Porto Torres		
2012–2013	Forlì	28	(3)
2013–2014	Terracina	28	(15)
2014	Olbia	13	(9)
2014–2015	Viterbese	25	(6)
2015–2017	Reggina	32	(7)
2017	→ Lumezzane (loan)	14	(0)
2017–2018	Cavese	20	(2)
2018–2020	Taranto	53	(9)
2020–2021	Albalonga	19	(4)
2021	Messina	4	(0)
2021–2022	Gelbison	28	(3)
2022	Nola	8	(1)
2022–2023	Palmese	12	(1)
2023	Ragusa	6	(1)
- * Club domestic league appearances and goals as of 17 December 2023

Fabio Oggiano (born 8 July 1987) is an Italian footballer who plays as a forward for Ragusa in the Serie D.

== Club career ==
On 3 July 2018, he joined Serie D club Taranto.

Oggiano joined to Serie D club Messina on 15 April 2021.

On 27 July 2022, Oggiano signed with Nola in Serie D.
