= Francisco García (footballer, born 1988) =

Paraguayan footballer

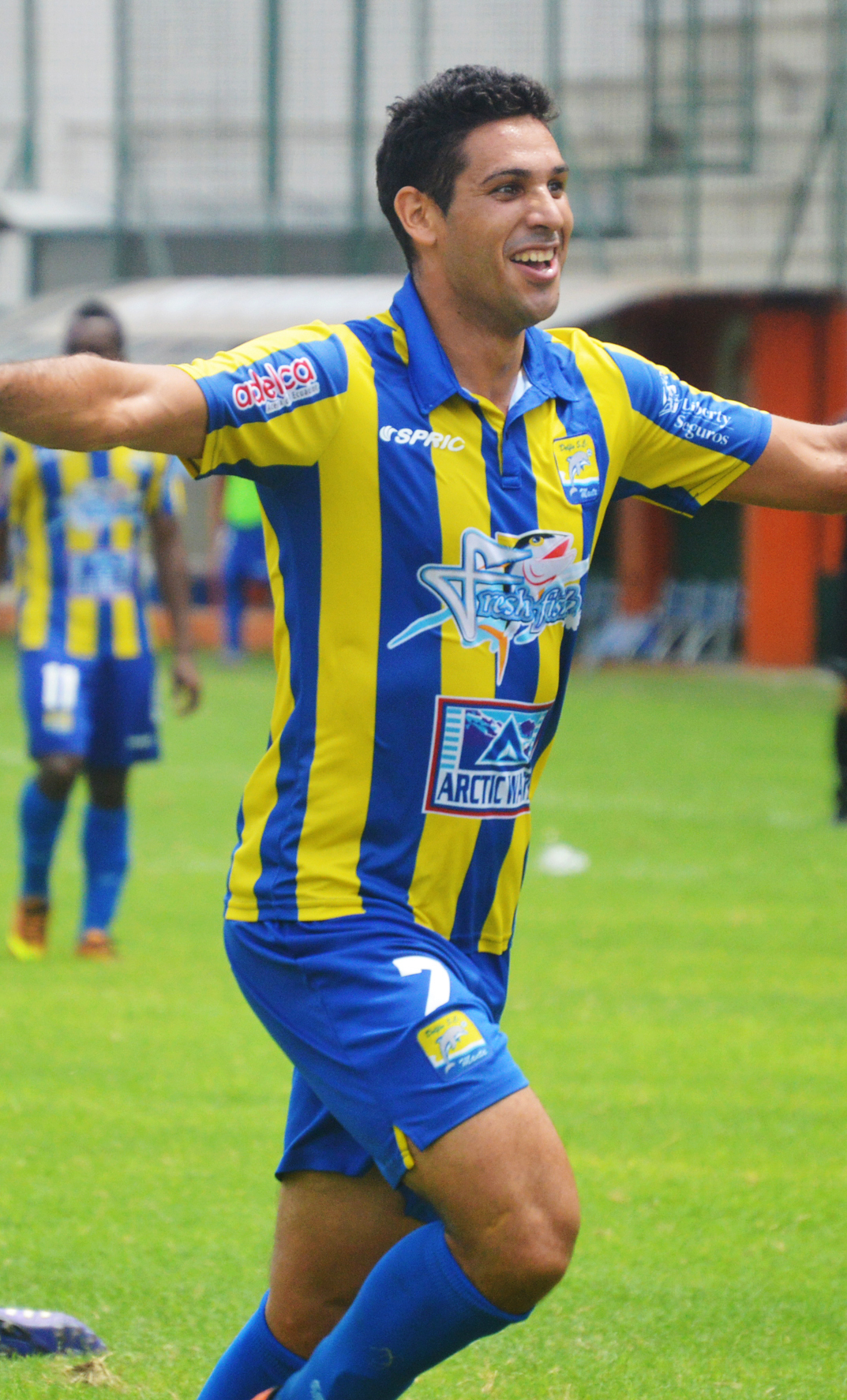

Personal information
- Full name: Francisco Javier García Brítez
- Date of birth: 25 November 1988 (age 37)
- Place of birth: San Lorenzo, Paraguay
- Height: 1.86 m (6 ft 1 in)
- Position: Forward

Team information
- Current team: ASD Montello

Senior career*
Years	Team	Apps	(Gls)
2008	Cerro Porteño	8	(0)
2009–2010	Rubio Ñu	34	(1)
2010	Cerro Porteño	1	(0)
2011	3 de Febrero	4	(0)
2011–2012	Sport Colombia		
2012–2013	Deportivo Capiatá		
2014	Delfín	36	(6)
2016	Colón	26	(4)
2017	Técnico Universitario	35	(3)
2018	Leones	8	(0)
2019	Martín Ledesma		
2019	Calcio Cittanovese	10	(2)
2020–	ASD Montello	0	(0)
- * Club domestic league appearances and goals as of 10:28, 27 August 2020 (UTC)

Francisco Javier García Brítez (born 25 November 1988) is a Paraguayan footballer who plays as a forward for ASD Montello.

== Career ==
García's career began in Paraguay with Cerro Porteño, with the forward making eight appearances in the 2008 Paraguayan Primera División season. Rubio Ñu signed García in 2009. Thirty-four matches and one goal, versus ex-club Cerro Porteño on 31 October 2009, followed across two seasons. He rejoined Cerro Porteño in 2010, before moving to 3 de Febrero in 2011. García then featured in the Paraguayan División Intermedia for both Sport Colombia and Deportivo Capiatá between 2011 and 2012. 2014 saw García sign for Ecuador's Delfín. He scored six goals in Serie B that year, which included his first over UT Cotopaxi.

Two years later, in 2016, García returned to the second tier in Ecuador with Colón. Having featured twenty-six times, García joined Técnico Universitario in 2017. He had scored on two occasions for Colón against them in the previous year, while his first goal for Técnico Universitario arrived on 8 April versus Colón; in a season which ended as champions. In 2018, García switched Ecuador for Colombia by agreeing to play for Leones of Categoría Primera A. He made his debut during a home defeat to Alianza Petrolera in July, which was the first of eight overall fixtures as Leones were relegated; he was subsequently released.

In August 2019, following a stint with Martín Ledesma, it was confirmed that García had joined Italian Serie D club Calcio Cittanovese. He scored two goals in ten appearances for them. Ahead of January 2020, García signed for Eccellenza Veneto side ASD Montello.

== Personal life ==
Whilst in Italian football with ASD Montello, García ran into serious financial difficulties due to the COVID-19 pandemic.

== Career statistics ==
As of 27 August 2020.

Club statistics
Club	Season	League			Cup		Continental		Other		Total	
Club	Season	Division	Apps	Goals	Apps	Goals	Apps	Goals	Apps	Goals	Apps	Goals
Cerro Porteño	2008	Primera División	8	0	—		0	0	0	0	8	0
Rubio Ñu	2009	Primera División	25	1	—		—		0	0	25	1
Rubio Ñu	2010	Primera División	9	0	—		—		0	0	9	0
Rubio Ñu	Total		34	1	—		—		0	0	34	1
Cerro Porteño	2010	Primera División	1	0	—		—		0	0	1	0
3 de Febrero	2011	Primera División	4	0	—		—		0	0	4	0
Delfín	2014	Serie B	36	6	—		—		0	0	36	6
Colón	2016	Serie B	26	4	—		—		0	0	26	4
Técnico Universitario	2017	Serie B	35	3	—		—		1 (Note: Appearance(s) in the Serie B play-offs)	0	36	3
Leones	2018	Categoría Primera A	8	0	3	0	—		0	0	11	0
Calcio Cittanovese	2019–20	Serie D	10	2	0	0	—		0	0	10	2
ASD Montello	2019–20	Eccellenza Veneto	0	0	0	0	—		0	0	0	0
Career total			162	16	3	0	0	0	1	0	166	16

== Honours ==
Técnico Universitario

- Serie B: 2017
