= SSD Athletic Club Palermo =

Italian football club

Athletic Club Palermo
- Full name: Società Sportiva Dilettantistica Athletic Club Palermo
- Nicknames: Nerobiancorosa (Black, white and pink)
- Founded: 21 August 2012; 14 years ago as Resuttana San Lorenzo
- Ground: Velodromo Paolo Borsellino, Palermo, Italy
- Capacity: 11,155
- Chairman: Gaetano Conte
- Head coach: Emanuele Ferraro
- League: Serie D Group I
- 2025–26: Serie D Group I, 4 of 18
- Website: www.athleticclubpalermo.it
| Home colours | Away colours |

Società Sportiva Dilettantistica Athletic Club Palermo (pronounced [aˈtlɛːtik ˈklab paˈlɛrmo, - ˈklɛb -]), commonly known as Athletic Club or Athletic Palermo, is an Italian football club based in Palermo, Sicily, who compete in Serie D, the fourth tier of the Italian football league system.

== History ==
Founded on 21 August 2012 as Resuttana San Lorenzo to represent the namesake neighbourhood, part of Palermo's sixth municipality, the club began its journey in the Terza Categoria division. It gradually progressed through the amateur regional leagues of Sicily, finally reaching Eccellenza in 2022. In 2023, the club was renamed Athletic Club Palermo, aiming to establish itself as the city's second-biggest club. Adopting black and pink as official colours, they became known as 'nerorosa', in contrast to Palermo FC's 'rosanero' nickname. At the start of the 2023–24 season, its first in Eccellenza Sicily, the club signed former Palermo and ACF Fiorentina player Mario Santana. However, Santana's tenure at the club ended in December 2023 with his retirement from football. The team's first season in the fifth tier proved challenging but ultimately successful, as the nerorosa managed to avoid relegation despite losing their last match against league leaders Akragas.

In the 2024–25 season, Athletic Club Palermo began with ambitions to climb further, signing multiple professional players, including several former Palermo members, for their Eccellenza Sicily campaign. Notable signings included Antonio Di Gaudio, Roberto Crivello and Antonio Mazzotta. On 6 April 2025, the club achieved promotion to Serie D after securing the Eccellenza title with one match left. The following season, the club transitioned into an SSD, formalizing its new organizational structure on 16 July 2025, which includes palermitano footballer Antonino La Gumina as part of the board.

== Colours and badge ==
Logo used during the 2023–24 season.

The first club logo, when its name was Resuttana San Lorenzo, featured a stylized eagle, drawn in modern black-and-white lines, inside a circle with pink accents and the club name. In 2023, the club changed its name and modified its logo to include the new name. However, in July 2024, the club updated its logo once again, unveiling a new design dominated by black and pink and incorporating the letters "ACP," representing the club's name.

=== Shirt sponsors and manufacturers ===
| Period | Kit manufacturer | Shirt sponsor |
|---|---|---|
| 2024– | Zeus Sport | Escort Advisor |

== Stadium ==
The Athletic Club plays its home matches at the Comunale Salvatore Favazza of Terrasini, in the metropolitan city of Palermo, with approximately 1,500 The club has, however, stated in various occurrences the intention to relocate to the Velodromo Paolo Borsellino, in which they started training in 2024.

On 11 September 2025, the club was formally granted permission to play its home games at the Velodromo, effective immediately.

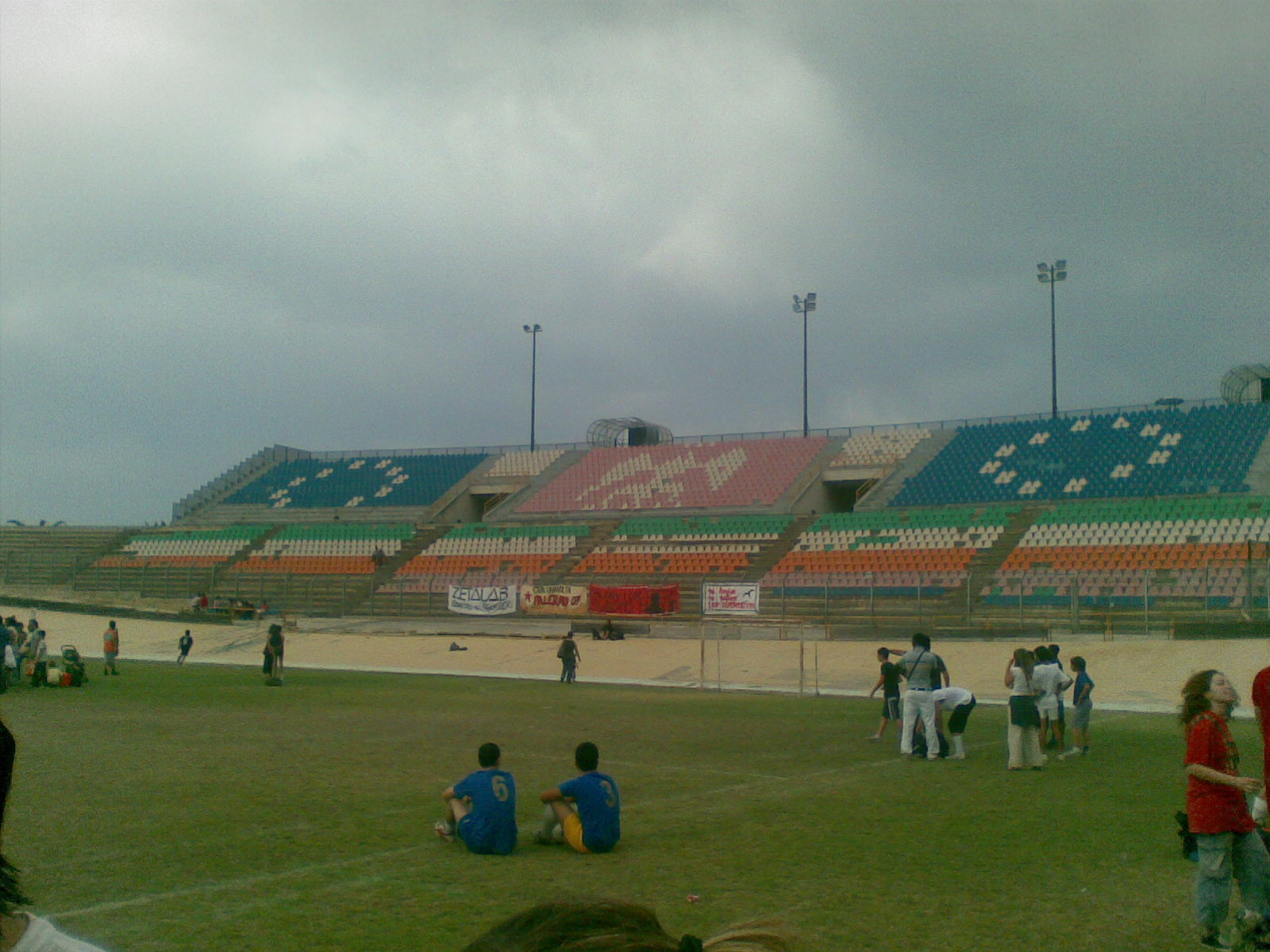
The Borsellino Stadium where Athletic plays

== Coaching staff ==
=== Managerial history ===
The following is a list of SSD Athletic Club Palermo managers throughout history.

| Name | Nationality | Years |
|---|---|---|
| Filippo Raciti | (Italy) | 202?–2025 |
| Emanuele Ferraro | (Italy) | 2025– |

=== Club personnel ===
As of 13 September 2025

| Position | Name |
|---|---|
| Head coach | (Italy) Emanuele Ferraro |
| Assistant coach | (Italy) Antonino Cucchiara |
| Goalkeeper coach | (Italy) Francesco Lima |
| Fitness coach | (Italy) Antonino Romagnolo |
| Physiotherapist | (Italy) Nahuel Basilone |
| Chief doctor | (Italy) Luigi Infantino |
