= Antonio Mazzotta =

Italian footballer (born 1989)

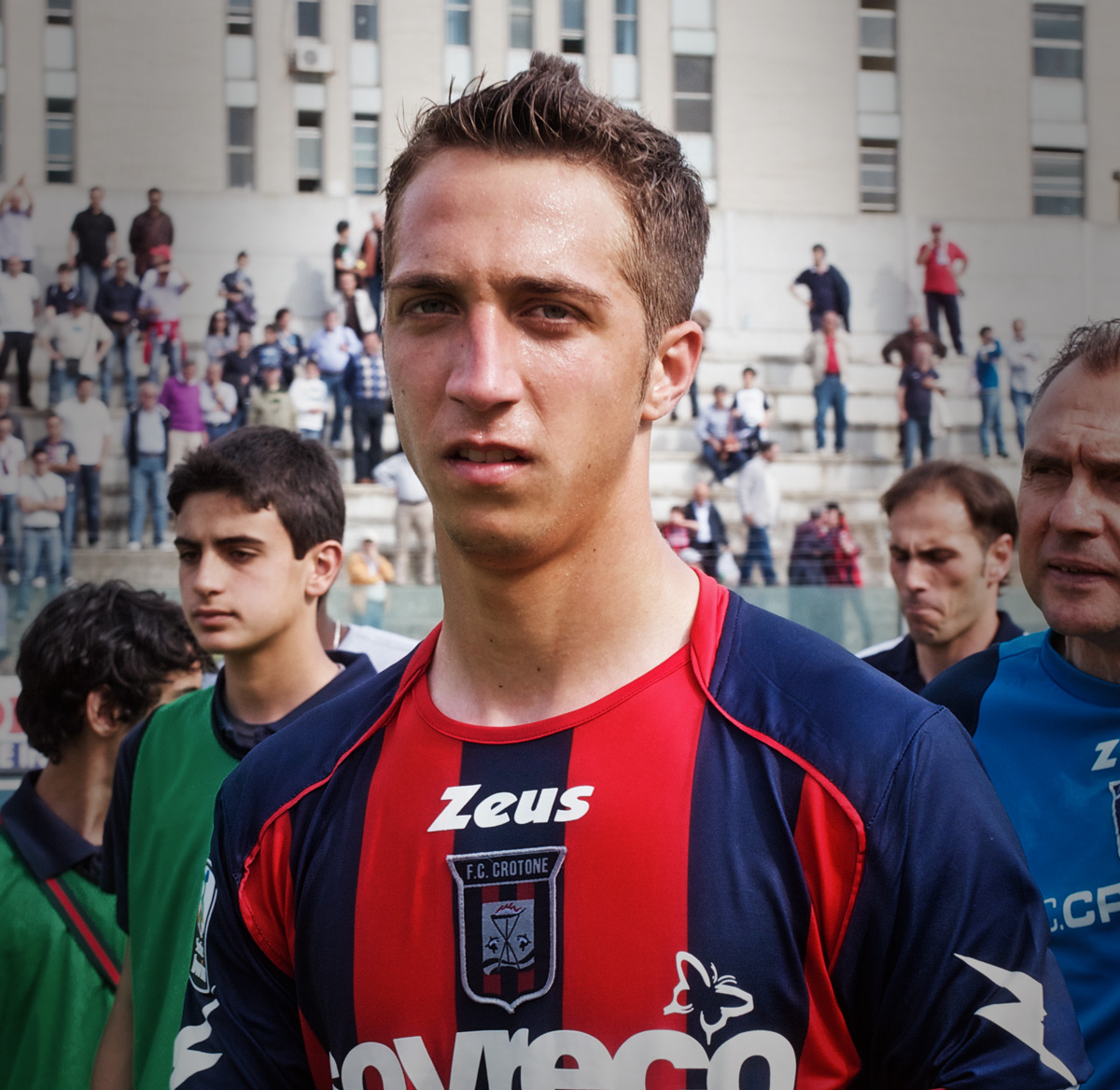

Personal information
- Full name: Antonio Mazzotta
- Date of birth: 2 August 1989 (age 37)
- Place of birth: Palermo, Italy
- Height: 1.83 m (6 ft 0 in)
- Position: Left back

Team information
- Current team: Athletic Club Palermo
- Number: 7

Youth career
- –2005: Fortitudo Golden Boys
- 2005–2006: Kamarat
- 2006–2009: Palermo

Senior career*
Years	Team	Apps	(Gls)
2009–2011	Lecce	20	(0)
2010–2011	→ Pescara (loan)	12	(0)
2011–2014	Crotone	112	(1)
2014–2016	Cesena	21	(0)
2015	→ Catania (loan)	19	(0)
2016	→ Pescara (loan)	10	(0)
2016–2018	Pescara	29	(0)
2016–2017	→ Frosinone (loan)	31	(1)
2018–2019	Palermo	11	(1)
2019–2021	Crotone	34	(2)
2021–2023	Bari	42	(0)
2023–2024	Catania	15	(0)
2024–	Athletic Club Palermo	49	(7)

International career
2009–2010	Italy U20	7	(1)
2010–2011	Italy U21	2	(0)
- * Club domestic league appearances and goals as of 19 May 2023

Antonio Mazzotta (born 2 August 1989) is an Italian professional footballer who plays as a defender for Serie D club Athletic Club Palermo.

== Club career ==
Mazzotta started his career at Eccellenza Sicily amateurs Kamarat and then joined his hometown club Palermo in 2006. In August 2009, he was loaned to Lecce who had recently relegated to Serie B. Mazzotta made his debut six days later in a 2–6 loss to Sampdoria at Coppa Italia. After winning the 2009–10 Serie B title and therefore ensuring a place in the 2010–11 Serie A, Lecce used its option to buy half of Mazzotta's transfer rights from Palermo and sent the player out on loan to Serie B club Pescara.

In January 2011, he left Pescara due to lack of first-team opportunities to join fellow Serie B club Crotone, again on loan from Lecce and Palermo. The loan is extended for another year. On 22 June 2012, Lecce announced from their website that they had acquired Mazzotta's full transfer rights.

He successively moved back to his hometown club Palermo for the 2018–19 Serie B campaign. Following Palermo's exclusion from the Serie B, he was released with all other players in July 2019.

On 19 August 2019, he returned on a one-year deal to Crotone.

On 4 August 2021, he signed a two-year contract with Bari in Serie C.

On 21 July 2023, Mazzotta returned to Catania.

After being released by the end of the season, Mazzotta signed for Eccellenza Sicily amateurs Athletic Club Palermo on 14 September 2024.

== International career ==
Mazzotta represented Italy at Under-20 level and was part of the Italian squad at the 2009 FIFA U-20 World Cup held in Egypt, playing a total of four games during the competition, also scoring a goal in the quarter-finals against Hungary.

On 11 August 2010, he made his debut with the Italy U-21 team in a friendly match against Denmark.

== Honours ==
Bari

- Serie C: 2021–22 (Group C)
