= Bubacarr Marong =

Italian football player (born 2000)

Personal information
- Date of birth: 10 January 2000 (age 26)
- Place of birth: Sanchaba, Serekunda, The Gambia
- Height: 1.90 m (6 ft 3 in)
- Position: Centre-back

Team information
- Current team: ASD Castrumfavara

Youth career
- 2017–2018: Parmonval

Senior career*
Years	Team	Apps	(Gls)
2018–2019	Parmonval	30	(0)
2019–2024	Palermo	13	(0)
2022–2023	→ Gelbison (loan)	13	(0)
2024–2025	Taranto	5	(0)
2026–	ASD Castrumfavara	0	(0)
- * Club domestic league appearances and goals as of 26 September 2026

Bubacarr Marong (born 10 January 2000) is a Gambian footballer who plays as a centre-back for ASD Castrumfavara.

== Club career ==
Marong reached Italy in 2017 as a refugee from his native Gambia, reaching the Sicilian coast of Trapani after having spent months in Libya to save enough money to pay for the sailing trip. He was then relocated to Palermo, where he was noticed by Salvatore Tedesco, a former footballer and brother of Giacomo and Giovanni Tedesco, as well as Paolo Calafiore, head coach of Eccellenza amateurs Parmonval, based in the Palermo neighbourhood of Mondello, who eventually signed him, and with whom he played 30 games.

In 2019, following Palermo's exclusion from professional football and the club being readmitted to Serie D under a new property, he was signed by the Rosanero for the 2019–20 season, during which he however failed in making his debut; despite that, he was confirmed by Palermo for the club's upcoming Serie C season.

On 11 April 2021, Marong finally made his debut on a Rosanero shirt under head coach Giacomo Filippi, playing the full 90 minutes in a 2020–21 Serie C league game against Vibonese. He was subsequently featured consistently for the ending part of the season, including all of the four promotion playoff games; his performances won him a new four-year professional contract, which he signed in August 2021.

On 29 July 2022, he was loaned out to newly-promoted Serie C club Gelbison.

After the loan deal with Gelbison ended, Marong returned to Palermo and was included as part of the Primavera Under-19 squad for the season. After making only a handful of appearances for the Under-19 team, Marong left Palermo on 30 June 2024 following the expiration of his contract.

On 27 August 2024, Marong signed a one-year contract for Serie C club Taranto. He was released in 2025, following the club's exclusion from the Serie C league due to repeated financial and administrative irregularities.

== Career statistics ==
=== Club ===
As of 23 December 2021

Appearances and goals by club, season and competition
Club	Season	League			National cup		Other		Total	
Club	Season	Division	Apps	Goals	Apps	Goals	Apps	Goals	Apps	Goals
Palermo	2019–20	Serie D	0	0	0	0	—		0	0
Palermo	2020–21	Serie C	5	0	—		4 (Note: All appearance(s) in promotion play-offs.)	0	9	0
Palermo	2021–22	Serie C	4	0	3	0	0	0	7	0
Palermo	Total		9	0	3	0	4	0	16	0
Career total			9	0	3	0	4	0	16	0
