= Pietro Balistreri =

Italian football player

Personal information
- Date of birth: 14 January 1986 (age 40)
- Place of birth: Palermo, Italy
- Height: 1.83 m (6 ft 0 in)
- Position: Striker

Team information
- Current team: ASD Don Carlo Misilmeri

Youth career
- Palermo

Senior career*
Years	Team	Apps	(Gls)
2004–2008	Palermo	2	(0)
2005	Pisa (loan)	14	(2)
2006	Melfi (loan)	0	(0)
2006	Cremonese (loan)	11	(0)
2007	Gela (loan)	9	(0)
2007–2008	Castelnuovo (loan)	21	(5)
2008–2010	Monopoli	54	(16)
2010–2012	Ternana	8	(0)
2011	Campobasso	36	(20)
2012	Perugia	4	(2)
2012–2013	Foligno	34	(9)
2013–2014	Taranto	31	(12)
2014–2015	Torres	17	(3)
2015	Reggina (loan)	12	(1)
2015–2016	Gubbio	13	(4)
2016	Foligno	15	(3)
2016–2017	Taranto	11	(1)
2017	Nardò	13	(1)
2017	Campobasso	17	(6)
2018–2020	Marsala	51	(15)
2020	FC Messina	3	(0)
2020–2021	Atletico Terme Fiuggi	2	(0)
2021	ASD Troina	18	(4)
2021	Sancataldese Calcio	13	(1)
2022	ASD Don Carlo Misilmeri		

International career
2004–2005	Italy U-19	2	(1)
- * Club domestic league appearances and goals as of 22:25, 14 January 2022 (UTC)

Pietro Balistreri (born 14 January 1986, in Palermo) is an Italian football player currently playing for ASD Don Carlo Misilmeri of Eccellenza.

== Career ==
A Palermo youth product, he played two Serie A games for the Rosanero during the 2004–05 season. He successively moved to Serie C1's Pisa in 2005 and spent his entire career playing for several teams in the lower divisions of Italian football.
