= Francesco Vaccaro (footballer) =

Italian footballer

Personal information
- Date of birth: 1 April 1999 (age 27)
- Place of birth: Pescara, Italy
- Height: 1.78 m (5 ft 10 in)
- Position: Left back

Team information
- Current team: Acireale
- Number: 27

Youth career
- ASD Poggio degli Ulivi
- 2015–2016: Virtus Lanciano
- 2016–2017: Bari

Senior career*
Years	Team	Apps	(Gls)
2017–2018	Bari	0	(0)
2017–2018	→ Potenza (loan)	5	(1)
2018–2019	Team Altamura	31	(0)
2019–2020	Palermo	20	(0)
2020–2021	Pontedera	27	(0)
2021–2022	Mantova	8	(0)
2022	Avezzano	12	(0)
2022–2023	Chieti	14	(1)
2023–2024	Acireale	25	(0)
2024–2025	CastrumFavara		
2025–2026	Savoia	16	(1)
2026–	Acireale		
- * Club domestic league appearances and goals as of 3 May 2026

Francesco Vaccaro (born 1 April 1999) is an Italian professional footballer who plays as a left back for Eccellenza club Acireale.

== Club career ==
Vaccaro started his career in Virtus Lanciano academy and Bari between 2016 and 2017. He made his professional debut for Serie D club Potenza on 2017–18 season.

On 9 August 2019, he joined to Palermo.

On 1 September 2021, Vaccaro signed for Mantova.

Since 9 September 2022 he is a player of Avezzano, Serie D club.
