= SSD FC Messina =

Association Football Club in Messina, Sicily

Football Club Messina
- Full name: Football Club Messina; S.r.l.
- Nickname: Giallorossi (Yellow-and-red)
- Founded: 1969 (as Camaro)
- Dissolved: 2021
- Ground: San Filippo-Franco Scoglio, Messina, Italy
- Capacity: 38,730
- 2021–22: Serie D/I (excluded during season)
Home colours	Away colours

Football Club Messina was an Italian football club based in Messina, Sicily, formerly known as S.S.D. Città di Messina and U.S.D. Camaro Messina, and disbanded in 2021.

== History ==
=== Foundation ===
The club is the direct heir of U.S.D. Camaro Messina, an amateur football club from the Messina neighbourhood of Camaro that was founded in 1969.

=== Città di Messina ===
In 2010 the club was renamed to S.S.D. Città di Messina.

In the season 2011–12 the team was promoted from Eccellenza Sicily Group B to Serie D after playoffs.

However, they were then relegated twice, and won two straight promotion in 2017 from 2016–17 Promozione Sicily and 2018 from 2017–18 Eccellenza Sicily to find themselves back to Serie D for the 2018–19 Serie D, at the same level with the historical main team in the city, ACR Messina. The club escaped relegation in 2019 after winning a playoff against Locri.

=== Football Club Messina ===
In the summer of 2019, the club was acquired by supermarket entrepreneur Rocco Arena, who was also the owner of Spanish club CF Independiente Alicante (heir of Alicante CF).

On 13 July 2019, the Italian Football Federation approved a change name request for the club, which was renamed Football Club Messina.

In the 2020–21 Serie D season, FC Messina ended in second place, behind crosstown rivals ACR Messina. They later won the Serie D Girone I playoffs, defeating Acireale in the semifinal and Gelbison in the final, thus ensuring them the right to be admitted to Serie C in case of a league vacancy.

In July 2021, following Serie D Girone A champions Gozzano's withdrawal, FC Messina applied to be readmitted to Serie C. However, the request to be readmitted was denied by the Lega Pro committee, and successively also on appeal, due to the club's inability to provide a valid surety in time.

The 2021–22 Serie D campaign saw club owner Rocco Arena relinquishing from investing in the club during the season. In December the club released most of its players and failed to show up at two consecutive league games, thus being excluded from the league with immediate effect.

== Colors and badge ==
Its colors are yellow and red. They usually play with blue kit, to avoid getting confused with the principal team of the city, ACR Messina.

== Stadium ==
The club originally played its home games in the old stadium of the city, the 11,900 seater Stadio Giovanni Celeste.

In 2018 the club announced their relocation to the newly rebranded "Despar Stadium" in the outskirts of the city, a football field owned by local amateur football club Camaro. However, as the stadium did not meet the minimum requirements to host Serie D games, Città di Messina used the city's main venue Stadio San Filippo as its home for the beginning of the season.
