= 2020–21 Palermo FC season =

Palermo
2020–21 season
- President: Dario Mirri
- Manager: Roberto Boscaglia (until 27 February 2021); Giacomo Filippi (from 27 February 2021, as caretaker)
- Stadium: Renzo Barbera
- Serie C: 7th (Group C)
- Play-offs: First national round
- Top goalscorer: League: Lorenzo Lucca (13); All: Lorenzo Lucca (13)
- Average home league attendance: 0
- Biggest win: 3–0 vs Monopoli
- Biggest defeat: 0–2 vs Teramo; 0–2 vs Avellino; 0–2 vs Foggia; 2–4 vs Juve Stabia
| Home colours | Away colours | 120th anniversary colours |

The 2020–21 season was Palermo Football Club's first season in Serie C, the third tier of Italian football, following promotion from Serie D during the 2019–20 season. Palermo returned to the third division after 19 years, having last played in Serie C1 in 2000–01.

== Staff ==
Management Staff

- Chairman: Dario Mirri
- CEO: Rinaldo Sagramola
- General Secretary: Giuseppe Li Vigni
- Sporting Director: Renzo Castagnini
- Youth Teams Manager: Rosario Argento, then Leandro Rinaudo
- Team Manager & Press Officer: Andrea Siracusa
- Event Manager: Antonino Lentini
- Security Officer: Francesco Meli
- Marketing Manager: Gaetano Lombardo
- Merchandising Manager: Riccardo Montesanto
- Social Media Manager: Marco Sirchia

Technical Staff

- Head coach: Roberto Boscaglia (until 27 February 2021), then Giacomo Filippi (from 27 February 2021)
- Assistant Head coach: Giacomo Filippi (until 27 February 2021), then Fabio Levacovich (from 10 March 2021)
- Assistant coach: Emanuele Lupo
- Goalkeeper coach: Michele Marotta
- Personal trainers: Marco Nastasi, Marco Petrucci

== Players ==
=== Squad information ===
Players and squad numbers last updated on 24 April 2021.
Appearances and goals include domestic leagues (Serie A, Serie B, Serie C and Serie D), national and league cups (Coppa Italia and Coppa Italia Serie D), international cup (UEFA Cup) and other competitions (Promotion play-offs) and correct as of 26 May 2021.
Note: Flags indicate national team as has been defined under FIFA eligibility rules. Players may hold more than one non-FIFA nationality.

| No. | Name | Nat | Position(s) | Date of birth (age) | Signed in | Contract ends | Signed from | Transfer Fee | Apps. | Goals |
Goalkeepers
| 1 | Alberto Pelagotti | (Italy) | GK | 9 March 1989 (age 37) | 2019 | 2022 | (Italy) Arezzo | Free | 65 | –57 |
| 12 | Mattia Fallani (Note: On loan.) | (Italy) | GK | 31 March 2001 (age 25) | 2019 | 2021 | (Italy) SPAL | Free | 4 | –1 |
Defenders
| 2 | Masimiliano Doda | (Albania) | RB / RWB | 17 November 2000 (age 25) | 2019 | 2024 | (Italy) Sampdoria | Undisclosed | 34 | 1 |
| 3 | Niccolò Corrado | (Italy) | LB | 19 March 2000 (age 26) | 2020 | 2021 | (Italy) Inter | Free | 7 | 0 |
| 4 | Andrea Accardi | (Italy) | CB / RB / LB / RWB | 30 July 1995 (age 31) | 2019 | 2022 | (Italy) Palermo (Note: Accardi played for Unione Sportiva Città di Palermo until the exclusion of the club from Serie B, then he was signed by the new phoenix club admitted to Serie D in 2019.) | N/A | 59 | 0 |
| 6 | Roberto Crivello | (Italy) | LB / CB | 14 September 1991 (age 35) | 2019 | 2024 | (Italy) Spezia | Free | 47 | 0 |
| 13 | Edoardo Lancini | (Italy) | CB | 10 April 1994 (age 32) | 2019 | 2022 | (Italy) Brescia | Free | 41 | 3 |
| 15 | Ivan Marconi | (Italy) | CB | 25 October 1989 (age 37) | 2020 | 2022 | (Italy) Monza | Undisclosed | 29 | 1 |
| 16 | Manuel Peretti | (Italy) | CB | 7 March 2000 (age 26) | 2019 | 2022 | (Italy) Hellas Verona | Undisclosed | 33 | 1 |
| 24 | Michele Somma | (Italy) | CB | 16 March 1995 (age 31) | 2020 | 2023 | (Spain) Deportivo La Coruña | Free | 21 | 1 |
| 26 | Bubacarr Marong | (The Gambia) | CB | 10 January 2000 (age 26) | 2019 | 2022 | (Italy) Parmonval | Free | 9 | 0 |
| 29 | Alberto Almici | (Italy) | RB / RWB | 11 January 1993 (age 33) | 2020 | 2023 | (Italy) Hellas Verona | Free | 19 | 1 |
Midfielders
| 5 | Andrea Palazzi | (Italy) | CM / CB | 24 February 1996 (age 30) | 2020 | 2021 | (Italy) Monza | Free | 24 | 0 |
| 8 | Malaury Martin | (France) | CM | 25 August 1988 (age 38) | 2019 | 2021 | (Scotland) Hearts | Free | 36 | 1 |
| 18 | Francesco De Rose | (Italy) | CM | 21 June 1987 (age 39) | 2021 | 2022 | (Italy) Reggina | Undisclosed | 21 | 0 |
| 19 | Moses Odjer | (Ghana) | CM | 17 August 1996 (age 30) | 2020 | 2022 | (Italy) Trapani | Free | 26 | 0 |
| 21 | Jérémie Broh | (Italy) | CM | 21 March 1997 (age 29) | 2020 | 2023 | (Italy) Sassuolo | Undisclosed | 28 | 0 |
| 27 | Gregorio Luperini | (Italy) | CM / AM | 10 February 1994 (age 32) | 2020 | 2023 | (Italy) Trapani | Free | 33 | 6 |
Forwards
| 7 | Roberto Floriano | (Italy) | LW | 14 August 1986 (age 40) | 2020 | 2022 | (Italy) Bari | Free | 40 | 12 |
| 9 | Andrea Saraniti | (Italy) | CF | 23 July 1988 (age 38) | 2020 | 2022 | (Italy) Lecce | Undisclosed | 31 | 5 |
| 10 | Andrea Silipo | (Italy) | RW | 17 April 2001 (age 25) | 2020 | 2024 | (Italy) Roma | Undisclosed | 34 | 3 |
| 11 | Mario Santana (C) | (Argentina) | SS / AM / RWB / LWB | 23 December 1981 (age 44) | 2019 | 2021 | (Italy) Pro Patria | Free | 143 | 11 |
| 14 | Nicola Valente | (Italy) | RW / LW / RWB / LWB | 6 October 1991 (age 35) | 2020 | 2022 | (Italy) Carrarese | Free | 35 | 6 |
| 17 | Lorenzo Lucca | (Italy) | CF | 10 September 2000 (age 26) | 2020 | 2024 | (Italy) Torino | Undisclosed | 30 | 14 |
| 20 | Mamadou Kanouté | (Senegal) | LW / RW | 7 October 1993 (age 33) | 2020 | 2022 | (Italy) Catanzaro | Undisclosed | 35 | 1 |
| 23 | Nicola Rauti | (Italy) | LW / RW / CF / AM | 17 April 2000 (age 26) | 2020 | 2021 | (Italy) Torino | Free | 34 | 4 |
Other players
| 22 | Marco Matranga | (Italy) | GK | 10 September 2002 (age 24) | 2020 | | (Italy) Youth Sector | N/A | - | - |
| 22/25/30 | Giorgio Faraone | (Italy) | GK | 12 October 2002 (age 24) | 2020 | | (Italy) Youth Sector | N/A | - | - |
| 25 | Christian Cangemi | (Italy) | RB / CB | 7 June 2002 (age 24) | 2020 | | (Italy) Youth Sector | N/A | - | - |
| 18 | Salvatore Florio | (Italy) | CM | 28 October 2002 (age 24) | 2020 | | (Italy) Youth Sector | N/A | - | - |

== Transfers ==
=== Summer 2020 ===
==== In ====
| Date | Pos. | Player | Age | Moving from | Fee | Notes | Source |
|---|---|---|---|---|---|---|---|
| 16 July 2020 | FW | (Italy) Andrea Silipo | 19 | (Italy) Roma | Undisclosed | Redemption after loan with an option for future pay-back for €0.5M within two years | |
| 13 August 2020 | FW | (Italy) Andrea Saraniti | 32 | (Italy) Lecce | Undisclosed | Permanent deal | |
| 13 August 2020 | FW | (Italy) Nicola Valente | 28 | (Italy) Carrarese | Free | Permanent deal | |
| 20 August 2020 | DF | (Italy) Ivan Marconi | 30 | (Italy) Monza | Undisclosed | Permanent deal | |
| 21 August 2020 | DF | (Italy) Manuel Peretti | 20 | (Italy) Hellas Verona | Undisclosed | Redemption after loan with an option for future pay-back for €0.3M within two years | |
| 3 September 2020 | DF | (Italy) Niccolò Corrado | 20 | (Italy) Inter | Free | On loan until 30 June 2021 with an option to buy and counter-option | |
| 5 September 2020 | MF | (Italy) Andrea Palazzi | 24 | (Italy) Monza | Free | On loan until 30 June 2021 | |
| 19 September 2020 | MF | (Ghana) Moses Odjer | 24 | (Italy) Trapani | Free | Permanent deal | |
| 24 September 2020 | FW | (Senegal) Mamadou Kanouté | 26 | (Italy) Catanzaro | Undisclosed | Permanent deal | |
| 25 September 2020 | MF | (Italy) Jérémie Broh | 23 | (Italy) Sassuolo | Undisclosed | Permanent deal | |
| 28 September 2020 | FW | (Italy) Nicola Rauti | 20 | (Italy) Torino | Free | On loan until 30 June 2021 | |
| 30 September 2020 | DF | (Italy) Michele Somma | 25 | (Spain) Deportivo La Coruña | Free | Permanent deal | |

==== Out ====
| Date | Pos. | Player | Age | Moving to | Fee | Notes | Source |
|---|---|---|---|---|---|---|---|
| 30 June 2020 | MF | (Italy) Erdis Kraja | 19 | (Italy) Atalanta | Free | End of loan | |
| 30 June 2020 | MF | (Italy) Christian Langella | 20 | (Italy) Pisa | Free | End of loan | |
| 30 June 2020 | MF | (Italy) Luigi Mendola | 19 | (Italy) Vibonese | Free | End of loan | |
| 30 June 2020 | FW | (Italy) Mattia Felici | 19 | (Italy) Lecce | Free | End of loan | |
| 1 July 2020 | GK | (Italy) Gabriele Corallo | 18 | (Italy) Vigor Lamezia | Free | Contract expired | |
| 1 July 2020 | DF | (Italy) Francesco Vaccaro | 21 | (Italy) Pontedera | Free | Contract expired | |
| 1 July 2020 | MF | (Italy) Danilo Ambro | 21 | (Italy) Vibonese | Free | Contract expired | |
| 1 July 2020 | MF | (Italy) Giammarco Corsino | 28 | (Italy) Resuttana San Lorenzo | Free | Contract expired | |
| 1 July 2020 | MF | (Argentina) Juan Mauri | 31 | Unattached | Free | Contract expired | |
| 1 July 2020 | MF | (Italy) Andrea Rizzo Pinna | 20 | Unattached | Free | Contract expired | |
| 1 July 2020 | FW | (Italy) Andrea Ferrante | 19 | Unattached | Free | Contract expired | |
| 1 July 2020 | FW | (Italy) Luca Ficarrotta | 29 | (Italy) Città di Sant'Agata | Free | Contract expired | |
| 1 July 2020 | FW | (Italy) Raimondo Lucera | 19 | (Italy) Acireale | Free | Contract expired | |
| 1 July 2020 | FW | (Italy) Giovanni Ricciardo | 33 | (Italy) Seregno | Free | Contract expired | |
| 1 July 2020 | FW | (Italy) Ferdinando Sforzini | 35 | (Italy) Campobasso | Free | Contract expired | |
| 7 September 2020 | MF | (Switzerland) Alessandro Martinelli | 27 | Retired | —N/a | Health issues | |

=== Post-summer transfers ===
==== In ====
| Date | Pos. | Player | Age | Moving from | Fee | Notes | Source |
|---|---|---|---|---|---|---|---|
| 6 October 2020 | MF | (Italy) Gregorio Luperini | 26 | (Italy) Trapani | Free | Permanent deal | |
| 13 October 2020 | DF | (Italy) Alberto Almici | 27 | (Italy) Hellas Verona | Free | Permanent deal | |

=== Winter 2021 ===
==== In ====
| Date | Pos. | Player | Age | Moving from | Fee | Notes | Source |
|---|---|---|---|---|---|---|---|
| 23 January 2021 | MF | (Italy) Francesco De Rose | 33 | (Italy) Reggina | Undisclosed | Permanent deal | |

==== Out ====
| Date | Pos. | Player | Age | Moving to | Fee | Notes | Source |
|---|---|---|---|---|---|---|---|
| 7 January 2021 | DF | (Italy) Christian Cangemi | 18 | (Italy) FC Messina | Free | Out on loan until 30 June 2021 | |

Total expenditure: Undisclosed

Total revenue: €0

Net income: Unknown ▼

== Competitions ==
=== Overall ===
| Competition | First match | Last match | Starting round | Final position | Record | | | | | | | |
| Competition | First match | Last match | Starting round | Final position | Pld | W | D | L | GF | GA | GD | Win % |
|---|---|---|---|---|---|---|---|---|---|---|---|---|
| Serie C | 27 September 2020 | 2 May 2021 | Matchday 1 | 7th | 36 | 14 | 11 | 11 | 44 | 40 | +4 | 38.89 |
| Play-offs | 9 May 2021 | 26 May 2021 | First preliminary round | First national round | 4 | 3 | 0 | 1 | 5 | 1 | +4 | 75.00 |
| Total | | | | | 40 | 17 | 11 | 12 | 49 | 41 | +8 | 42.50 |

Source: Competitive matches

=== Serie C Group C ===
==== League table ====
| Pos | Team | Pld | W | D | L | GF | GA | GD | Pts | Qualification |
|---|---|---|---|---|---|---|---|---|---|---|
| 5 | Juve Stabia | 36 | 18 | 7 | 11 | 51 | 39 | +12 | 61 | Qualification to the promotion play-offs |
| 6 | Catania (Note: Catania have 2 points deducted due to financial irregularities.) | 36 | 17 | 10 | 9 | 50 | 38 | +12 | 59 | Qualification to the promotion play-offs |
| 7 | Palermo | 36 | 14 | 11 | 11 | 44 | 40 | +4 | 53 | Qualification to the promotion play-offs |
| 8 | Teramo | 36 | 13 | 13 | 10 | 38 | 34 | +4 | 52 | Qualification to the promotion play-offs |
| 9 | Foggia | 36 | 14 | 9 | 13 | 36 | 39 | −3 | 51 | Qualification to the promotion play-offs |

Source: Lega Pro (in Italian), Soccerway (in English)
Rules for classification: 1) Points; 2) Head-to-head points; 3) Head-to-head goal difference; 4) Goal difference; 5) Goals scored; 6) Lower goals against; 7) Wins; 8) Lower losses; 9) Away wins; 10) Lower home losses.

==== Results summary ====
| Overall | | | | | | | | Home | | | | | | Away | | | | | |
| Pld | W | D | L | GF | GA | GD | Pts | W | D | L | GF | GA | GD | W | D | L | GF | GA | GD |
|---|---|---|---|---|---|---|---|---|---|---|---|---|---|---|---|---|---|---|---|
| 36 | 14 | 11 | 11 | 44 | 40 | +4 | 53 | 7 | 6 | 5 | 26 | 22 | +4 | 7 | 5 | 6 | 18 | 18 | 0 |

Source: Competitive matches

==== Results by round ====
| Round | 1 | 2 | 3 | 4 | 5 | 6 | 7 | 8 | 9 | 10 | 11 | 12 | 13 | 14 | 15 | 16 | 17 | 18 | 19 | 20 | 21 | 22 | 23 | 24 | 25 | 26 | 27 | 28 | 29 | 30 | 31 | 32 | 33 | 34 | 35 | 36 | 37 | 38 |
|---|---|---|---|---|---|---|---|---|---|---|---|---|---|---|---|---|---|---|---|---|---|---|---|---|---|---|---|---|---|---|---|---|---|---|---|---|---|---|
| Ground | A | H (Note: Played between rounds 11 and 12.) | A | H | A | H (Note: Played between rounds 12 and 13.) | A (Note: Played between rounds 8 and 9.) | H (Note: Played between rounds 13 and 14.) | H | A | H | A | H | A | H | A | H | A | H | H | A | H | A | H | A | H | A | A | H | A | H | A (Note: Played between rounds 34 and 35.) | H (Note: Played between rounds 35 and 36.) | A | H | A | H | A |
| Result | L | W | D | L | L | L | D | D | D | W | W | C | W | L | W | D | D | W | L | D | D | D | L | W | W | L | L | W | L | W | C | L | W | W | D | D | W | W |
| Position | 18 | 19 | 15 | 17 | 19 | 18 | 18 | 19 | 19 | 17 | 11 | 12 | 10 | 11 | 10 | 10 | 10 | 9 | 9 | 9 | 9 | 10 | 11 | 8 | 8 | 9 | 9 | 9 | 10 | 9 | 9 | 10 | 10 | 9 | 9 | 9 | 8 | 7 |

Source: Palermo matches 2020/21
A = Away; H = Home; W = Win; D = Draw; L = Loss; C = Cancelled

Note

In order to preserve chronological evolvements, any postponed matches are not included to the round at which they were originally scheduled, but added to the full round they were played immediately afterwards.

==== Matches ====
| 27 September 2020 1 | Teramo | 2–0 | Palermo | Teramo |
| 15:00 CEST (UTC+02:00) | Tentardini (yellow card) 34'; Santoro 57'; Di Francesco 80' | Report | Saraniti (yellow card) 38' | Stadium: Gaetano Bonolis; Attendance: 308; Referee: Valerio Maranesi |

| 18 November 2020 2 | Palermo | 1–0 | Potenza | Palermo |
| 15:00 CET (UTC+01:00) | Crivello (yellow card) 53'; Luperini 86'; Pelagotti (yellow card) 89'; Lucca (yellow card) 90+3' | Report | Viteritti (yellow card) 20'; Marcone (yellow card) 66'; Ricci (yellow card) 90+5' | Stadium: Renzo Barbera; Attendance: 0 Referee: Paolo Bitonti |
Note: On 3 October match was postponed from its original date of 4 October due to two confirmed cases of COVID-19 at Potenza and scheduled for 29 October. On 26 October match was postponed a second time due to many confirmed cases diagnosed at Palermo in the previous week.

| 7 October 2020 3 | Ternana | 0–0 | Palermo | Terni |
| 15:00 CEST (UTC+02:00) | Furlan (yellow card) 25'; Falletti (yellow card) 40' | Report | Lancini (yellow card) 12' | Stadium: Libero Liberati; Attendance: 0 Referee: Matteo Gualtieri |

| 11 October 2020 4 | Palermo | 0–2 | Avellino | Palermo |
| 15:00 CEST (UTC+02:00) | Odjer (yellow card) 15'; Luperini (yellow card) 31'; Lancini (yellow card) 31' | Report | D'Angelo 20'; Fella 57'; Aloi (yellow card) 62'; Ciancio (yellow card) 67'; Tito (yellow card) 76' | Stadium: Renzo Barbera; Attendance: 0 Referee: Matteo Marcenaro |

| 18 October 2020 5 | Bisceglie | 2–1 | Palermo | Bisceglie |
| 15:00 CEST (UTC+02:00) | Maimone 18', (yellow card) 21'; Vitale (yellow card) 30'; Mansour 33'; Pelliccia (yellow card) 55'; Cittadino (yellow card) 79'; Spurio (yellow card) | Report | Odjer (yellow card) 50'; Santana (yellow card) 67'; Silipo (yellow card) 78'; Luperini 87' | Stadium: Gustavo Ventura; Attendance: 303; Referee: Marco Ricci |

| 25 November 2020 6 | Palermo | 0–1 | Turris | Palermo |
| 15:00 CET (UTC+01:00) | Rauti (yellow card) 35'; Saraniti (yellow card) 57'; Odjer (yellow card) 72' | Report | Lorenzini (yellow card) 35'; Rainone (yellow card) 64'; Abagnale (yellow card) 72'; Esempio (yellow card) 81'; Romano (yellow card) 81'; Pandolfi 90+5', (yellow card) 90+5'; Lonoce (yellow card) | Stadium: Renzo Barbera; Attendance: 0 Referee: Simone Galipò |
Note: A few minutes before the kick-off match was postponed from its original date of 21 October due to 10 confirmed cases of COVID-19 at Palermo.

| 4 November 2020 7 | Catanzaro | 1–1 | Palermo | Catanzaro |
| 17:30 CET (UTC+01:00) | Contessa (yellow card) 21'; Riccardi (yellow card) 25'; Fazio (yellow card) 62'; Evacuo 74' (pen.); Curiale (yellow card) 86' | Report | Broh (yellow card) 30' (yellow-red card) 48'; Rauti (yellow card) 42'; Crivello (red card) 71'; Odjer (yellow card) 77'; Evacuo 88' (o.g.); Lucca (yellow card) | Stadium: Nicola Ceravolo; Attendance: 0 Referee: Daniele Perenzoni |
Note: On 22 October match was postponed from its original date of 25 October due to many confirmed cases of COVID-19 diagnosed at Palermo in the previous days.

| 2 December 2020 8 | Palermo | 3–3 | Viterbese | Palermo |
| 15:00 CET (UTC+01:00) | Crivello (yellow card) 33'; Almici (yellow card) 42'; Saraniti (yellow card) 51', (goal) 76'; Lucca 57', 90+1'; Marconi (yellow card) 80' | Report | Bensaja (yellow card) 36'; Simonelli 65'; Mbende (yellow card) 66', (goal) 81'; Tounkara 68', (yellow card) 84'; Ferrani (yellow card) 78' | Stadium: Renzo Barbera; Attendance: 0 Referee: Mario Cascone |
Note: On 28 October match was postponed from its original date of 1 November because Palermo had less than 13 eligible players of the first squad, including at least one goalkeeper, due to many confirmed cases of COVID-19 diagnosed in the previous week.

| 9 November 2020 9 | Palermo | 1–1 | Catania | Palermo |
| 21:00 CET (UTC+01:00) | Kanouté 15'; Odjer (yellow card) 30'; Almici (yellow card) 42'; Palazzi (yellow card) 52'; Pelagotti (yellow card) 61'; Rauti (yellow card) 90+4' | Report | Pinto (yellow card) 32'; Pecorino (yellow card) 66', (goal) 80'; Welbeck (yellow card) 82' | Stadium: Renzo Barbera; Attendance: 0 Referee: Luca Zufferli |

| 12 November 2020 10 | Juve Stabia | 1–2 | Palermo | Castellammare di Stabia |
| 15:00 CET (UTC+01:00) | Garattoni (yellow card) 75'; Bubas (yellow card) 80'; Allievi (yellow card) 90+1'; Mastalli 90+6' (pen.) | Report | Saraniti 5'; Palazzi (yellow card) 45+1'; Broh (yellow card) 58'; Odjer (yellow card) 61'; Floriano 73'; Accardi (yellow card) 78'; Corrado (yellow card) 90+5' | Stadium: Romeo Menti; Attendance: 0 Referee: Luigi Carella |

| 15 November 2020 11 | Palermo | 2–1 | Paganese | Palermo |
| 15:00 CET (UTC+01:00) | Rauti 11'; Saraniti 33'; Lucca (yellow card) 77' | Report | Schiavino (yellow card) 36', (goal) 52'; Cigagna (yellow card) 45' | Stadium: Renzo Barbera; Attendance: 0 Referee: Fabio Natilla |

| 22 November 2020 12 | Trapani | Cancelled | Palermo | Erice |
| | | | | Stadium: Polisportivo Provinciale |
Note: Match was cancelled due to the exclusion of Trapani from league.

| 29 November 2020 13 | Palermo | 3–0 | Monopoli | Palermo |
| 15:00 CET (UTC+01:00) | Pelagotti (yellow card) 3'; Saraniti (yellow card) 5', (goal) 75'; Almici 20' (pen.), (yellow card) 51'; Marconi 23'; Somma (yellow card) 80' | Report | Paolucci (yellow card) 9' | Stadium: Renzo Barbera; Attendance: 0 Referee: Mario Vigile |

| 6 December 2020 14 | Foggia | 2–0 | Palermo | Foggia |
| 14:00 CET (UTC+01:00) | D'Andrea 17'; Rocca 36'; Kalombo (yellow card) 81'; Dell'Agnello (yellow card) 89'; Salvi (yellow card) 90+2' | Report | Saraniti (yellow card) 50'; Lucca (yellow card) 64' | Stadium: Pino Zaccheria; Attendance: 0 Referee: Luca Angelucci |

| 13 December 2020 15 | Palermo | 2–0 | Casertana | Palermo |
| 14:30 CET (UTC+01:00) | Rauti 19'; Palazzi (yellow card) 28'; Odjer (yellow card) 29'; Marconi (yellow card) 50' (red card) 75'; Lucca 71'; Luperini (yellow card) 73'; Doda (yellow card) 78' | Report | Origlia (yellow card) 30'; Buschiazzo (red card) 75' | Stadium: Renzo Barbera; Attendance: 0 Referee: Francesco Cosso |

| 20 December 2020 16 | Vibonese | 0–0 | Palermo | Vibo Valentia |
| 15:00 CET (UTC+01:00) | Redolfi (yellow card) 43'; Statella (yellow card) 55' (yellow-red card) 61' | Report | Saraniti (yellow card) 87' | Stadium: Luigi Razza; Attendance: 0 Referee: Gino Garofalo |

| 23 December 2020 17 | Palermo | 1–1 | Bari | Palermo |
| 15:00 CET (UTC+01:00) | Saraniti (yellow card) 60'; Odjer (yellow card) 70'; Lucca 88'; Crivello (yellow card) 90'; Fallani (yellow card) | Report | Antenucci (yellow card) 31'; D'Ursi 45' | Stadium: Renzo Barbera; Attendance: 0 Referee: Ermanno Feliciani |

| 9 January 2021 18 | Cavese | 0–1 | Palermo | Cava de' Tirreni |
| 14:30 CET (UTC+01:00) | Russotto (yellow card) 21'; Matera (yellow card) 39' (yellow-red card) 87'; Marzupio (yellow card) 74' | Report | Martin (yellow card) 17'; Lucca (penalty missed) 40'; Valente (yellow card) 62'; Palazzi (yellow card) 64'; Lancini (yellow card) 85'; Rauti 90+2', (yellow card) 90+3' | Stadium: Simonetta Lamberti; Attendance: 0 Referee: Valerio Maranesi |

| 17 January 2021 19 | Palermo | 1–2 | Virtus Francavilla | Palermo |
| 12:30 CET (UTC+01:00) | Valente 37' | Report | Castorani 67'; Nunzella (yellow card) 68'; Ciccone 87' | Stadium: Renzo Barbera; Attendance: 0 Referee: Nicolò Marini |

| 24 January 2021 20 | Palermo | 1–1 | Teramo | Palermo |
| 12:30 CET (UTC+01:00) | Lucca 30'; Luperini (yellow card) 54'; Valente (yellow card) 80' | Report | Bombagi (yellow card) 14'; Birligea 20'; Soprano (yellow card) 31'; Tentardini (yellow card) 42'; Viero (yellow card) 64'; Ilari (yellow card) 70' | Stadium: Renzo Barbera; Attendance: 0 Referee: Eduart Pashuku |

| 30 January 2021 21 | Potenza | 0–0 | Palermo | Potenza |
| 12:30 CET (UTC+01:00) | | Report | Kanouté (yellow card) 59'; Rauti (yellow card) 63'; De Rose (yellow card) 69' | Stadium: Alfredo Viviani; Attendance: 0 Referee: Francesco Carrione |

| 3 February 2021 22 | Palermo | 1–1 | Ternana | Palermo |
| 15:00 CET (UTC+01:00) | Lucca 46', (yellow card) 81'; Valente (yellow card) 49'; Odjer (yellow card) 55'; Luperini (yellow card) 72'; De Rose (yellow card) 90+2' | Report | Furlan (yellow card) 44'; Falletti 73' | Stadium: Renzo Barbera; Attendance: 0 Referee: Paride Tremolada |

| 7 February 2021 23 | Avellino | 1–0 | Palermo | Avellino |
| 15:00 CET (UTC+01:00) | Carriero (yellow card) 15'; Illanes (yellow card) 18'; Silvestri 50' | Report | De Rose (yellow card) 83' | Stadium: Partenio-Adriano Lombardi; Attendance: 0 Referee: Matteo Gualtieri |

| 13 February 2021 24 | Palermo | 3–1 | Bisceglie | Palermo |
| 14:30 CET (UTC+01:00) | Lucca 14', 84', (yellow card) 41'; De Rose (yellow card) 28'; Luperini 37', (yellow card) 80'; Rauti (yellow card) 62'; Marconi (yellow card) 87' | Report | Rocco 7', (yellow card) 45+1'; Cittadino (yellow card) 10'; Altobello (yellow card) 45'; Giron (yellow card) 81' | Stadium: Renzo Barbera; Attendance: 0 Referee: Andrea Bordin |

| 17 February 2021 25 | Turris | 1–2 | Palermo | Torre del Greco |
| 15:00 CET (UTC+01:00) | Di Nunzio (yellow card) 35'; Romano (yellow card) 36', (goal) 45'; Persano (yellow card) 64'; Rainone (red card) 90+5' | Report | Lucca 17', 48'; Martin (yellow card) 41'; Accardi (yellow card) 61' | Stadium: Amerigo Liguori; Attendance: 0 Referee: Paolo Bitonti |

| 21 February 2021 26 | Palermo | 1–2 | Catanzaro | Palermo |
| 12:30 CET (UTC+01:00) | Floriano (yellow card) 25', (goal) 31'; Palazzi (yellow card) 79'; Saraniti (yellow card) 84' (red card) 90+2' | Report | Verna 27'; Riccardi (yellow card) 29'; Corapi (yellow card) 61'; Martinelli 80'; Carlini (yellow card) 84' | Stadium: Renzo Barbera; Attendance: 0 Referee: Alessandro Di Graci |

| 27 February 2021 27 | Viterbese | 1–0 | Palermo | Viterbo |
| 12:30 CET (UTC+01:00) | Murilo (yellow card) 24' (penalty missed) 59'; Baschirotto (yellow card) 43'; Adopo 45+3', (yellow card) 78'; Bensaja (yellow card) 87'; Porru (yellow card) 90' | Report | Marconi (yellow card) 31'; Almici (yellow card) 57' (yellow-red card) 58'; Luperini (yellow card) 75'; Odjer (yellow card) 79' (red card) 79' | Stadium: Enrico Rocchi; Attendance: 0 Referee: Adalberto Fiero |

| 3 March 2021 28 | Catania | 0–1 | Palermo | Catania |
| 20:30 CET (UTC+01:00) | Sarao (yellow card) 30'; Sales (yellow card) 38'; Pinto (yellow card) 52' | Report | Marconi (yellow card) 30' (yellow-red card) 35'; Santana 60', (yellow card) 61'; Pelagotti (yellow card) 70'; Accardi (yellow card) 72' | Stadium: Angelo Massimino; Attendance: 0 Referee: Matteo Marcenaro |

| 7 March 2021 29 | Palermo | 2–4 | Juve Stabia | Palermo |
| 15:00 CET (UTC+01:00) | Luperini 6', 83'; Peretti (yellow card) 24'; Accardi (yellow card) 28'; Rauti (yellow card) 90+2'; Lucca (red card) 90+5' | Report | Berardocco (yellow card) 19', (goal) 27'; Fantacci (yellow card) 32', (goal) 48'; Marotta 67', 71'; Bovo (yellow card) 90+5' | Stadium: Renzo Barbera; Attendance: 0 Referee: Cristian Cudini |

| 13 March 2021 30 | Paganese | 0–1 | Palermo | Pagani |
| 20:30 CET (UTC+01:00) | Raffini (yellow card) 15'; Onescu (yellow card) 55'; Gaeta (yellow card) 67'; Bonavolontà (yellow card) 88'; Diop (yellow card) 90+1' | Report | De Rose (yellow card) 33'; Santana (yellow card) 59'; Floriano 60' | Stadium: Marcello Torre; Attendance: 0 Referee: Claudio Panettella |

| 17 March 2021 31 | Palermo | Cancelled | Trapani | Palermo |
| | | | | Stadium: Renzo Barbera |
Note: Match was cancelled due to the exclusion of Trapani from league.

| 7 April 2021 32 | Monopoli | 2–1 | Palermo | Monopoli |
| 15:00 CEST (UTC+02:00) | Vassallo (yellow card) 82'; De Paoli 88'; Viteritti 90+3'; Tazzer (yellow card) | Report | Somma 29', (yellow card) 37'; Marconi (yellow card) 57'; Odjer (yellow card) | Stadium: Vito Simone Veneziani; Attendance: 0 Referee: Francesco Luciani |
Note: On 18 March match was postponed from its original date of 20 March due to the outbreak of COVID-19 cases at Monopoli in the previous days.

| 14 April 2021 33 | Palermo | 1–0 | Foggia | Palermo |
| 15:00 CEST (UTC+02:00) | Rauti (yellow card) 30'; Luperini (yellow card) 38'; Kanoute (yellow card) 51'; De Rose (yellow card) 79'; Valente 81'; Peretti (yellow card) 90+4' | Report | Anelli (yellow card) 39'; Gavazzi (yellow card) 47' | Stadium: Renzo Barbera; Attendance: 0 Referee: Federico Longo |
Note: On 26 March match was postponed from its original date of 29 March due to the outbreak of COVID-19 cases at Foggia in the previous days.

| 3 April 2021 34 | Casertana | 2–3 | Palermo | Caserta |
| 13:00 CEST (UTC+02:00) | Cuppone (yellow card) 25', (goal) 43'; Varešanović (yellow card) 54'; Avella (yellow card) 87'; Buschiazzo 90+1' | Report | Lucca 2', 13', 45+1'; Luperini (yellow card) 32'; Odjer (yellow card) 37'; Martin (yellow card) 76'; Kanoute (penalty missed) 88'; Almici (red card) 89' | Stadium: Alberto Pinto; Attendance: 0 Referee: Valerio Maranesi |

| 10 April 2021 35 | Palermo | 0–0 | Vibonese | Palermo |
| 15:00 CEST (UTC+02:00) | Somma (yellow card) 78'; Accardi (yellow card) 90+3' | Report | Ciotti (yellow card) 79' | Stadium: Renzo Barbera; Attendance: 0 Referee: Marco Emmanuele |

| 18 April 2021 36 | Bari | 2–2 | Palermo | Bari |
| 15:00 CEST (UTC+02:00) | Candellone (yellow card) 26'; Di Cesare (yellow card) 30'; De Risio (yellow card) 52'; Mercurio 75'; Perrotta 90' | Report | Floriano 31' (pen.); Marconi (yellow card) 39'; Accardi (yellow card) 40'; Santana 55'; Lancini (yellow card) 74' | Stadium: San Nicola; Attendance: 0 Referee: Francesco Cosso |

| 25 April 2021 37 | Palermo | 3–2 | Cavese | Palermo |
| 17:30 CEST (UTC+02:00) | Lancini 26'; Valente 31'; Santana (yellow card) 78'; Rauti 82'; Accardi (yellow card) 86' | Report | Bubas 9'; Pompetti (yellow card) 24'; Cuccurullo (yellow card) 47'; Matera 76'; Scoppa (yellow card) 78' (yellow-red card) 90+3'; De Vito (yellow card) 90'; De Rosa (yellow card) 90+1' | Stadium: Renzo Barbera; Attendance: 0 Referee: Michele Delrio |

| 2 May 2021 38 | Virtus Francavilla | 1–3 | Palermo | Francavilla Fontana |
| 20:30 CEST (UTC+02:00) | Di Cosmo (yellow card) 18'; Nunzella 21'; Celli (yellow card) 56' | Report | Floriano (yellow card) 20'; Valente 30', 41'; Silipo 60' | Stadium: Giovanni Paolo II; Attendance: 0 Referee: Valerio Crezzini |

=== Play-offs ===
| 9 May 2021 First preliminary round | Palermo | 2–0 | Teramo | Palermo |
| 15:30 CEST (UTC+02:00) | Floriano 9' (pen.); Luperini (yellow card) 37', (goal) 44' | Report | Lásik (yellow card) 8'; Birligea (yellow card) 29'; Bombagi (yellow card) 90'; Pedro Ferreira (yellow card) | Stadium: Renzo Barbera; Attendance: 0 Referee: Nicolò Marini |

| 19 May 2021 Second preliminary round | Juve Stabia | 0–2 | Palermo | Castellammare di Stabia |
| 17:30 CEST (UTC+02:00) | Troest (yellow card) 12'; Elizalde (yellow card) 59'; Marotta (yellow card) 90+4' | Report | Valente 18'; Luperini (yellow card) 42'; Doda (yellow card) 62'; Saraniti 66' | Stadium: Romeo Menti; Attendance: 0 Referee: Marco Ricci |

==== First national round ====
| 23 May 2021 First leg | Palermo | 1–0 | Avellino | Palermo |
| 17:30 CEST (UTC+02:00) | De Rose (yellow card) 23'; Saraniti (yellow card) 31'; Marconi (yellow card) 35'; Floriano 87' (pen.) | Report | Ciancio (yellow card) 23'; Laezza (yellow card) 45'; Carriero (yellow card) 77'; Dossena (yellow card) 85'; Baraye (red card) | Stadium: Renzo Barbera; Attendance: 0 Referee: Matteo Gualtieri |

| 26 May 2021 Second leg | Avellino | 1–0 (1–1 agg.) | Palermo | Avellino |
| 20:45 CEST (UTC+02:00) | D'Angelo 33'; Aloi (yellow card) 42'; Fella (yellow card) | Report | Marconi (yellow card) 88' | Stadium: Partenio-Adriano Lombardi; Attendance: 0 Referee: Luca Zufferli |
Note: Avellino advanced due to higher-placed finish.

=== Appearances and goals ===
| No. | Pos | Nat | Player | Total | | Serie C | | Play-offs | |
| No. | Pos | Nat | Player | Apps | Goals | Apps | Goals | Apps | Goals |
Goalkeepers
| 1 | GK | (Italy) ITA | Alberto Pelagotti | 40 | -41 | 36 | -40 | 4 | -1 |
| 12 | GK | (Italy) ITA | Mattia Fallani | 0 | 0 | 0 | 0 | 0 | 0 |
| 22 | GK | (Italy) ITA | Marco Matranga | 0 | 0 | 0 | 0 | 0 | 0 |
| 22/25/30 | GK | (Italy) ITA | Giorgio Faraone | 0 | 0 | 0 | 0 | 0 | 0 |
Defenders
| 2 | DF | (Albania) ALB | Masimiliano Doda | 12 | 0 | 8 | 0 | 4 | 0 |
| 3 | DF | (Italy) ITA | Niccolò Corrado | 7 | 0 | 7 | 0 | 0 | 0 |
| 4 | DF | (Italy) ITA | Andrea Accardi | 33 | 0 | 29 | 0 | 4 | 0 |
| 6 | DF | (Italy) ITA | Roberto Crivello | 24 | 0 | 24 | 0 | 0 | 0 |
| 13 | DF | (Italy) ITA | Edoardo Lancini | 17 | 1 | 13 | 1 | 4 | 0 |
| 15 | DF | (Italy) ITA | Ivan Marconi | 29 | 1 | 25 | 1 | 4 | 0 |
| 16 | DF | (Italy) ITA | Manuel Peretti | 18 | 0 | 16 | 0 | 2 | 0 |
| 24 | DF | (Italy) ITA | Michele Somma | 21 | 1 | 21 | 1 | 0 | 0 |
| 25 | DF | (Italy) ITA | Christian Cangemi | 0 | 0 | 0 | 0 | 0 | 0 |
| 26 | DF | (The Gambia) GAM | Bubacarr Marong | 9 | 0 | 5 | 0 | 4 | 0 |
| 29 | DF | (Italy) ITA | Alberto Almici | 19 | 1 | 18 | 1 | 1 | 0 |
Midfielders
| 5 | MF | (Italy) ITA | Andrea Palazzi | 24 | 0 | 24 | 0 | 0 | 0 |
| 8 | MF | (France) FRA | Malaury Martin | 12 | 0 | 12 | 0 | 0 | 0 |
| 18 | MF | (Italy) ITA | Salvatore Florio | 0 | 0 | 0 | 0 | 0 | 0 |
| 18 | MF | (Italy) ITA | Francesco De Rose | 21 | 0 | 17 | 0 | 4 | 0 |
| 19 | MF | (Ghana) GHA | Moses Odjer | 26 | 0 | 26 | 0 | 0 | 0 |
| 21 | MF | (Italy) ITA | Jérémie Broh | 28 | 0 | 26 | 0 | 2 | 0 |
| 27 | MF | (Italy) ITA | Gregorio Luperini | 33 | 6 | 30 | 5 | 3 | 1 |
Forwards
| 7 | FW | (Italy) ITA | Roberto Floriano | 32 | 6 | 28 | 4 | 4 | 2 |
| 9 | FW | (Italy) ITA | Andrea Saraniti | 31 | 5 | 27 | 4 | 4 | 1 |
| 10 | FW | (Italy) ITA | Andrea Silipo | 25 | 1 | 21 | 1 | 4 | 0 |
| 11 | FW | (Argentina) ARG | Mario Santana | 24 | 2 | 20 | 2 | 4 | 0 |
| 14 | FW | (Italy) ITA | Nicola Valente | 35 | 6 | 31 | 5 | 4 | 1 |
| 17 | FW | (Italy) ITA | Lorenzo Lucca | 27 | 13 | 27 | 13 | 0 | 0 |
| 20 | FW | (Senegal) SEN | Mamadou Kanouté | 35 | 1 | 31 | 1 | 4 | 0 |
| 23 | FW | (Italy) ITA | Nicola Rauti | 34 | 4 | 33 | 4 | 1 | 0 |

=== Goalscorers ===
| Rank | No. | Pos | Nat | Name | Serie C | Play-offs | Total |
|---|---|---|---|---|---|---|---|
| 1 | 17 | FW | (Italy) | Lorenzo Lucca | 13 | | 13 |
| 2 | 7 | FW | (Italy) | Roberto Floriano | 4 | 2 | 6 |
| 2 | 27 | MF | (Italy) | Gregorio Luperini | 5 | 1 | 6 |
| 2 | 14 | FW | (Italy) | Nicola Valente | 5 | 1 | 6 |
| 5 | 9 | FW | (Italy) | Andrea Saraniti | 4 | 1 | 5 |
| 6 | 23 | FW | (Italy) | Nicola Rauti | 4 | | 4 |
| 7 | 11 | FW | (Argentina) | Mario Santana | 2 | | 2 |
| 8 | 29 | DF | (Italy) | Alberto Almici | 1 | | 1 |
| 8 | 20 | FW | (Senegal) | Mamadou Kanouté | 1 | | 1 |
| 8 | 13 | DF | (Italy) | Edoardo Lancini | 1 | | 1 |
| 8 | 15 | DF | (Italy) | Ivan Marconi | 1 | | 1 |
| 8 | 10 | FW | (Italy) | Andrea Silipo | 1 | | 1 |
| 8 | 24 | DF | (Italy) | Michele Somma | 1 | | 1 |
| Own goals | | | | | 1 (Note: Catanzaro 1–1 Palermo.) | | 1 |
| Totals | | | | | 44 | 5 | 49 |

=== Clean sheets ===
| Rank | No. | Pos | Nat | Name | Serie C | Play-offs | Total |
|---|---|---|---|---|---|---|---|
| 1 | 1 | GK | (Italy) | Alberto Pelagotti | 11 (Note: Rounds: 2–3, 13, 15–16, 18, 21, 28, 30, 33, 35.) | 3 (Note: First preliminary round, Second preliminary round, First leg of first national round.) | 14 |
| Totals | | | | | 11 | 3 | 14 |

=== Disciplinary record ===
| No. | Pos | Nat | Name | Serie C | | | Play-offs | | | Total | | |
| No. | Pos | Nat | Name | Yellow card | (yellow card) (yellow-red card) | Red card | Yellow card | (yellow card) (yellow-red card) | Red card | Yellow card | (yellow card) (yellow-red card) | Red card |
| 15 | DF | (Italy) | Ivan Marconi | 6 | 1 | 1 | 2 | | | 8 | 1 | 1 |
| 29 | DF | (Italy) | Alberto Almici | 3 | 1 | 1 | | | | 3 | 1 | 1 |
| 19 | MF | (Ghana) | Moses Odjer | 12 | | 1 | | | | 12 | 0 | 1 |
| 9 | FW | (Italy) | Andrea Saraniti | 8 | | 1 | 1 | | | 9 | 0 | 1 |
| 17 | FW | (Italy) | Lorenzo Lucca | 6 | | 1 | | | | 6 | 0 | 1 |
| 6 | DF | (Italy) | Roberto Crivello | 3 | | 1 | | | | 3 | 0 | 1 |
| 21 | MF | (Italy) | Jérémie Broh | 1 | 1 | | | | | 1 | 1 | 0 |
| 27 | MF | (Italy) | Gregorio Luperini | 8 | | | 2 | | | 10 | 0 | 0 |
| 23 | FW | (Italy) | Nicola Rauti | 8 | | | | | | 8 | 0 | 0 |
| 4 | DF | (Italy) | Andrea Accardi | 7 | | | | | | 7 | 0 | 0 |
| 18 | MF | (Italy) | Francesco De Rose | 6 | | | 1 | | | 7 | 0 | 0 |
| 5 | MF | (Italy) | Andrea Palazzi | 5 | | | | | | 5 | 0 | 0 |
| 13 | DF | (Italy) | Edoardo Lancini | 4 | | | | | | 4 | 0 | 0 |
| 1 | GK | (Italy) | Alberto Pelagotti | 4 | | | | | | 4 | 0 | 0 |
| 11 | FW | (Argentina) | Mario Santana | 4 | | | | | | 4 | 0 | 0 |
| 8 | MF | (France) | Malaury Martin | 3 | | | | | | 3 | 0 | 0 |
| 24 | DF | (Italy) | Michele Somma | 3 | | | | | | 3 | 0 | 0 |
| 14 | FW | (Italy) | Nicola Valente | 3 | | | | | | 3 | 0 | 0 |
| 2 | DF | (Albania) | Masimiliano Doda | 1 | | | 1 | | | 2 | 0 | 0 |
| 7 | FW | (Italy) | Roberto Floriano | 2 | | | | | | 2 | 0 | 0 |
| 20 | FW | (Senegal) | Mamadou Kanouté | 2 | | | | | | 2 | 0 | 0 |
| 16 | DF | (Italy) | Manuel Peretti | 2 | | | | | | 2 | 0 | 0 |
| 3 | DF | (Italy) | Niccolò Corrado | 1 | | | | | | 1 | 0 | 0 |
| 12 | GK | (Italy) | Mattia Fallani | 1 | | | | | | 1 | 0 | 0 |
| 10 | FW | (Italy) | Andrea Silipo | 1 | | | | | | 1 | 0 | 0 |
| Totals | | | | 104 | 3 | 6 | 7 | 0 | 0 | 111 | 3 | 6 |
