= Lorenzo Lucca =

Italian footballer (born 2000)

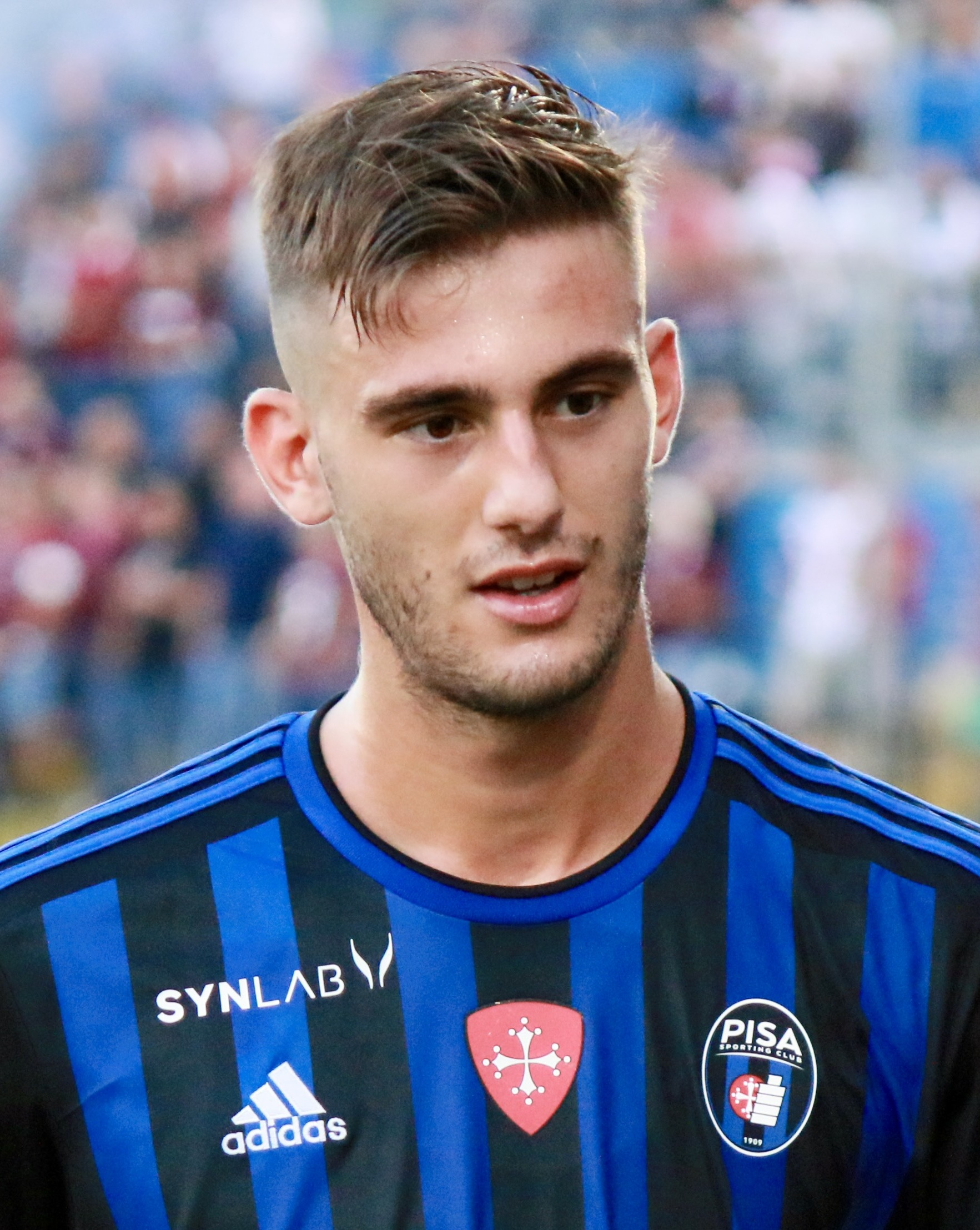
- Lucca with Pisa in 2021

Personal information
- Date of birth: 10 September 2000 (age 26)
- Place of birth: Moncalieri, Italy
- Height: 2.01 m (6 ft 7 in)
- Position: Striker

Team information
- Current team: Napoli
- Number: 20

Youth career
- 2005–2008: CBS Scuola Calcio
- 2008–2015: Torino
- 2015–2016: Chieri

Senior career*
Years	Team	Apps	(Gls)
2016–2017	Chieri	0	(0)
2016–2017	→ Atletico Torino (loan)	10	(2)
2017–2018	Vicenza	3	(0)
2018–2020	Torino	0	(0)
2018–2019	→ Brescia (loan)	0	(0)
2020–2021	Palermo	30	(14)
2021–2024	Pisa	30	(6)
2022–2023	→ Ajax (loan)	14	(2)
2022–2023	→ Jong Ajax (loan)	14	(6)
2023–2024	→ Udinese (loan)	37	(8)
2024–2026	Udinese	33	(12)
2025–2026	→ Napoli (loan)	16	(1)
2026–	Napoli	3	(0)
2026	→ Nottingham Forest (loan)	4	(1)

International career^{‡}
2021–2022	Italy U21	6	(2)
2024–	Italy	5	(0)
- * Club domestic league appearances and goals as of 5 September 2026 ‡ National team caps and goals as of 9 June 2025

Lorenzo Lucca (Italian pronunciation: [loˈrɛn.t͡so ˈluk.ka]; born 10 September 2000) is an Italian professional footballer who plays as a striker for Serie A club Napoli and the Italy national team.

== Club career ==
=== Early career ===
Born in Moncalieri, Lucca began playing youth football as a kid for CBS Scuola Calcio, a local team in Turin, and then moved to the Torino youth academy at age eight. He later moved to Chieri, a club in the province of Turin, but was discarded and allowed to join Atletico Torino. With Atletico Torino, he made his senior debut at age 16 in the Italian sixth-tier (Promozione), scoring two goals.

The following season, Lucca was signed by Vicenza, with whom he made his professional debut in 2018 at the age of 17 during a Serie C league game against Sambenedettese. Lucca was recalled by Torino in 2018 and loaned to Brescia. After scoring 16 goals in 18 games for the Brescia primavera youth side, he was called back at Torino in 2019 and played for the Toro primavera side for the first half of the 2019–20 season.

=== Palermo ===
On 31 January 2020, Lucca left Torino to join Palermo in Serie D on a free transfer. He only played three games for the Rosanero as part of the 2019–20 Serie D season which ended in promotion to Serie C for the club, also due to the league halt following the COVID-19 outbreak in the country. In July 2020, Lucca signed his first professional contract, penning a four-year deal with the Rosanero. For the 2020–21 Serie C season, Lucca started as a understudy to Andrea Saraniti, but soon broke into the first team and became the team topscorer by February, breaking the ten-goal threshold after scoring a brace against Turris.

=== Pisa ===
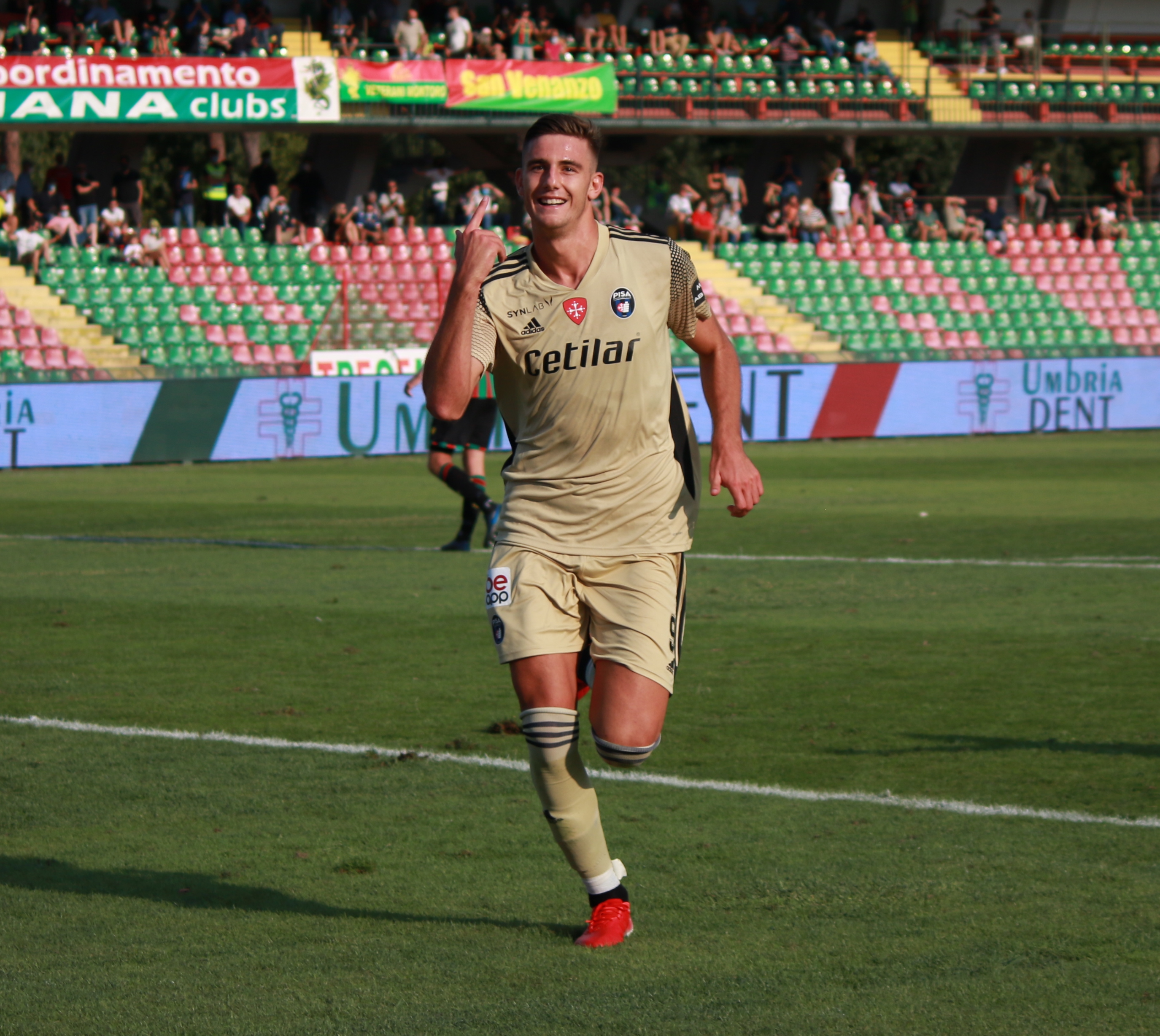
Lucca running towards fans after scoring against Ternana

On 21 July 2021, Lucca joined Serie B club Pisa, penning a five-year deal with the Neroazzurri. He made his debut for Pisa against SPAL and scored his first two goals for the club in a 2–0 victory against Alessandria. After bagging six goals in the first seven matches of the season, he stopped scoring, marking his season tally at six goals in 34 Serie B matches.

==== Loan to Ajax ====
On 5 August 2022, Eredivisie champions Ajax announced to have signed Lucca from Pisa, on a loan deal with an option to buy. He became the first Italian player in Ajax's history. He scored his first goal for the club on 6 November 2022, scoring against PSV Eindhoven in a 2–1 loss in the Eredivisie. After the loan with the Dutch club expired, he returned to Pisa.

=== Udinese ===
On 7 July 2023, Lucca joined fellow Italian side Udinese Calcio on a one-year loan. After a season as a regular for Udinese, on 13 June 2024, the club announced it had signed the player permanently. On 21 February 2025, he scored his tenth Serie A goal of the 2024–25 season in a 1–0 away win over Lecce. However, he sparked controversy by taking the penalty from the team's captain, Florian Thauvin, without his teammates' consent. Shortly after, he was substituted in the first half by coach Kosta Runjaić.

==== Loan to Napoli ====
On 18 July 2025, Lucca officially joined fellow Serie A club Napoli on loan for a fee of €9,000,000 with an obligation to buy for €26,000,000. Later that year, on 22 September, he netted his first goal in a 3–2 win over his former club Pisa.

==== Loan to Nottingham Forest ====
On 23 January 2026, Lucca joined Napoli from Udinese on a permanent basis. Immediately after, he signed for Premier League club Nottingham Forest on loan from Napoli for the remainder of the season with an option to buy. On 6 February, he scored his first and only goal for the club on his debut in a 3–1 loss against Leeds United On 10 June 2026, Nottingham Forest said the player would return to his home club at the end of the loan.

== International career ==
On 7 September 2021, Lucca made his debut with the Italy U21 squad, playing as a substitute in the qualifying match and won 1–0 against Montenegro. In March 2024, he was called up to the senior Italy squad for a friendly against Ecuador but had to withdraw through injury. On 14 October 2024, Lucca made his senior debut in a 2024–25 UEFA Nations League match against Israel, which ended in a 4–1 victory for the Italians.

== Career statistics ==
=== Club ===
As of match played 9 September 2026

Appearances and goals by club, season and competition
Club	Season	League			National cup (Note: Includes Coppa Italia, KNVB Cup)		Europe		Other		Total	
Club	Season	Division	Apps	Goals	Apps	Goals	Apps	Goals	Apps	Goals	Apps	Goals
Atletico Torino (loan)	2016–17	Promozione	10	2	—		—		—		10	2
Vicenza	2017–18	Serie C	3	0	—		—		0	0	3	0
Palermo	2019–20	Serie D	3	1	0	0	—		—		3	1
Palermo	2020–21	Serie C	27	13	0	0	—		0	0	27	13
Palermo	Total		30	14	0	0	—		0	0	30	14
Pisa	2021–22	Serie B	30	6	1	0	—		4 (Note: Appearances in Serie B promotion play-offs)	0	35	6
Ajax (loan)	2022–23	Eredivisie	14	2	1	0	1 (Note: Appearance(s) in UEFA Europa League)	0	—		16	2
Udinese (loan)	2023–24	Serie A	37	8	2	1	—		—		39	9
Udinese	2024–25	Serie A	33	12	3	2	—		—		36	14
Udinese	Udinese total		70	20	5	3	—		—		75	23
Napoli (loan)	2025–26	Serie A	16	1	1	1	5 (Note: Appearances in UEFA Champions League)	0	1 (Note: Appearance in Supercoppa Italiana)	0	23	2
Napoli	2026–27	Serie A	3	0	0	0	1	0	—		4	0
Napoli	Napoli total		19	1	1	1	6	0	1	0	27	2
Nottingham Forest (loan)	2025–26	Premier League	4	1	—		5	0	—		9	1
Career total			178	45	8	4	12	0	5	0	203	49

=== International ===
As of match played 9 June 2025

Appearances and goals by national team and year
National team	Year	Apps	Goals
Italy	2024	1	0
Italy	2025	4	0
Total		5	0

== Honours ==
Napoli

- Supercoppa Italiana: 2025–26
