= Edoardo Scanagatta =

Italian footballer (born 2002)

Personal information
- Date of birth: 6 April 2002 (age 24)
- Place of birth: Vicenza, Italy
- Height: 1.84 m (6 ft 0 in)
- Position: Defender

Team information
- Current team: Sammaurese

Youth career
- Atalanta

Senior career*
Years	Team	Apps	(Gls)
2021–2022	Atalanta	0	(0)
2021–2022	→ Paganese (loan)	25	(0)
2022–2023	Giugliano	10	(0)
2023	Mestre	7	(0)
2023–	Sammaurese	16	(0)

International career^{‡}
2018	Italy U17	1	(0)
- * Club domestic league appearances and goals as of 20 December 2023 ‡ National team caps and goals as of 6 August 2021

Edoardo Scanagatta (born 6 April 2002) is an Italian professional footballer who plays as a defender for Serie D club Sammaurese.

== Club career ==
On 16 July 2022, Scanagatta signed a two-year contract with Giugliano. On 30 January 2023, his contract with Giugliano was terminated by mutual consent. Two days later, Scanagatta joined Serie D club Mestre.
