= Luperini =

Luperini may refer to:

- Luperini (beetle), a tribe of leaf beetles
- Fabiana Luperini (born 1974), Italian cyclist
- Gregorio Luperini (born 1994), Italian footballer
