= Nunzio Brandi =

Italian footballer

Personal information
- Date of birth: 10 May 2001 (age 25)
- Place of birth: Naples, Italy
- Height: 1.84 m (6 ft 0 in)
- Position: Midfielder

Team information
- Current team: Mestre
- Number: 5

Youth career
- Hellas Verona

Senior career*
Years	Team	Apps	(Gls)
2020–2022	Hellas Verona	0	(0)
2020–2021	→ Turris (loan)	11	(0)
2021–2022	→ Lucchese (loan)	16	(0)
2022–2023	Taranto	5	(0)
2023–2025	Imolese	48	(5)
2025–2026	Legnago	31	(14)
2026–	Mestre	0	(0)
- * Club domestic league appearances and goals as of 9 November 2026

Nunzio Brandi (born 10 May 2001) is an Italian footballer who plays as a midfielder for Italian Serie D club Mestre.

== Club career ==
Born in Naples, Brandi was formed in Hellas Verona youth sector. He was promoted to the first team in the 2020–21 season.

On 1 September 2020, he was loaned to Serie C club Turris. Brandi made his professional debut on 4 October 2020 against Virtus Francavilla.

The next season, on 20 August 2021 he was loaned to Lucchese.
