= Abagnale (surname) =

Abagnale is an Italian surname. Notable people with the surname include:

- Alessandro Abagnale (born 1998), Italian footballer
- Frank Abagnale (born 1948), American security consultant
- Giovanni Abagnale (born 1995), Italian rower

== See also ==
- Abbagnale
