= Francesco Di Nunzio =

Italian professional footballer

Personal information
- Date of birth: 8 November 1985 (age 41)
- Place of birth: Rome, Italy
- Height: 1.90 m (6 ft 3 in)
- Position: Centre back

Team information
- Current team: Afragolese

Youth career
- Vicenza

Senior career*
Years	Team	Apps	(Gls)
2004–2006	Ferentino	37	(0)
2006–2009	Cassino	70	(0)
2009–2013	Sorrento	100	(3)
2013–2014	Juve Stabia	22	(0)
2014	Savoia	22	(0)
2015–2016	Melfi	15	(0)
2016	Cosenza	13	(0)
2016–2017	Südtirol	36	(0)
2017–2018	Catanzaro	26	(0)
2018–2023	Turris	127	(1)
2023–	Afragolese	0	(0)
- * Club domestic league appearances and goals as of 23 April 2023

Francesco Di Nunzio (born 8 November 1985) is an Italian professional footballer who plays for Afragolese, as a central defender.

== Club career ==
After appearing for Lega Pro sides, Di Nunzio joined Serie B club S.S. Juve Stabia on 14 July 2013. He appeared in more than 100 matches for his previous club, Sorrento Calcio.

On 31 August Di Nunzio made his division debut, starting in a 1–2 home loss against Spezia Calcio.

On 5 September 2018, he joined a Serie D club Turris.
