= Nicola Rauti =

Italian footballer (born 2000)

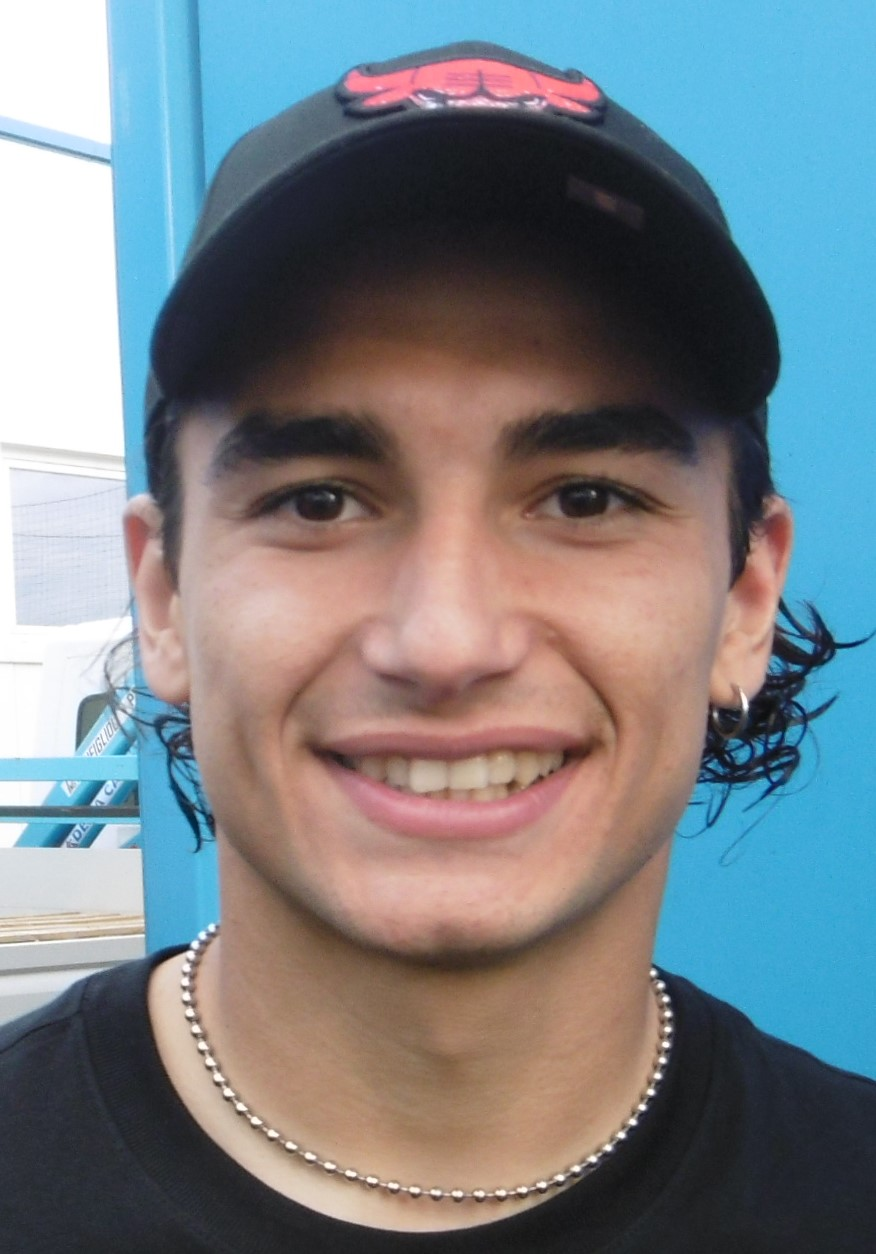
- Nicola Rauti in 2023

Personal information
- Date of birth: 17 April 2000 (age 26)
- Place of birth: Legnano, Italy
- Height: 1.80 m (5 ft 11 in)
- Position: Forward

Team information
- Current team: Vicenza

Youth career
- Inter Milan
- –2015: Novara
- 2015–2020: Torino

Senior career*
Years	Team	Apps	(Gls)
2019–	Torino	0	(0)
2020	→ Monza (loan)	5	(1)
2020–2021	→ Palermo (loan)	34	(4)
2021–2022	→ Pescara (loan)	29	(5)
2022–2023	→ SPAL (loan)	17	(0)
2023–2024	→ Südtirol (loan)	24	(1)
2024–2025	→ Vicenza (loan)	37	(8)
2025–2026	→ Vicenza (loan)	34	(10)

International career
2017	Italy U17	2	(0)
2018	Italy U18	3	(1)
2018	Italy U19	4	(1)
- * Club domestic league appearances and goals as of 29 April 2026

Nicola Rauti (born 17 April 2000) is an Italian professional footballer who plays as a forward for Vicenza.

== Club career ==
=== Torino ===
==== Loan to Monza ====
On 3 January 2020, Serie C side Monza announced the signing of Rauti on loan from Torino until the end of the season. On 12 January 2019, Rauti made his professional debut against Novara. Coming on as a substitute on the 91st minute, Rauti scored two minutes later from his first touch of the game; Monza won 3–0.

==== Loan to Palermo ====
On 28 September 2020, Rauti joined Palermo on loan.

==== Loan to SPAL ====
On 3 July 2022, Rauti joined SPAL on loan with an option to buy.

==== Loan to Südtirol ====
On 7 July 2023, he joined Südtirol on loan.

==== Loan to Vicenza ====
On 20 July 2024, Rauti moved on loan to Vicenza, with an option to buy.

== Career statistics ==
=== Club ===
As of 26 May 2021

Appearances and goals by club, season and competition
Club	Season	League			Coppa Italia		Other		Total	
Club	Season	Division	Apps	Goals	Apps	Goals	Apps	Goals	Apps	Goals
Monza (loan)	2019–20	Serie C	5	1	0	0	0	0	5	1
Palermo (loan)	2020–21	Serie C	33	4	—		1 (Note: Appearance(s) in Serie C promotion play-offs)	0	34	4
Career total			38	5	0	0	1	0	39	5

== Honours ==
Torino

- Coppa Italia Primavera: 2017–18
- Supercoppa Primavera: 2018

Monza

- Serie C Group A: 2019–20

Italy U18

- Mediterranean Games runner-up: 2018
