= Francesco De Rose =

Italian football player

Personal information
- Date of birth: 21 June 1987 (age 39)
- Place of birth: Cosenza, Italy
- Height: 1.69 m (5 ft 7 in)
- Position: Midfielder

Senior career*
Years	Team	Apps	(Gls)
2005–2006	San Fili	?	(0)
2006–2010	Cosenza	138	(2)
2011–2014	Reggina	52	(0)
2012–2013	→ Lecce (loan)	25	(4)
2014	→ Lecce (loan)	5	(0)
2014–2015	Barletta	31	(2)
2015–2017	Matera	62	(3)
2017–2018	Casertana	32	(4)
2018–2019	Südtirol	36	(0)
2019–2021	Reggina	32	(0)
2021–2022	Palermo	51	(0)
2022–2024	Cesena	65	(1)
2024–2026	Catania	20	(0)
- * Club domestic league appearances and goals as of 26 April 2026

Francesco De Rose (born 21 June 1987) is an Italian professional footballer who plays as a midfielder.

== Club career ==
De Rose began his career in 2005–2006 with the shirt of San Fili Calcio 1926, team of San Fili in the province of Cosenza. From the following season he moved to Cosenza, which at the time played the Serie D 2006-2007 . He remained in the team of his birth city until 2010, winning the promotion in the Lega Pro First Division 2009-2010 after the first place in the Lega Pro Second Division 2008–2009.

In January 2011 he was bought by Reggina, with whom he competed in the second part of the 2010-2011 Serie B championship and the entire 2011-2012 Serie B season. Just in 2010-2011 touches the promotion with the amaranth: in fact disputes the play-offs, but the team is eliminated from Novara; De Rose takes both semifinal challenges against the Piedmontese players.

In September 2012 he changed team once again, moving to Lecce (Lega Pro First Division 2012–2013) with the formula of the loan with the right of redemption. At the end of the season it is not redeemed by the Pugliese, thus returning to Reggina. Play only the first half of the 2013–14 season, since on January 20, 2014, returns to dress the shirt of Lecce, moving with the formula of the loan with the right of redemption. [6] At the end of the season, return to dress the shirt of amaranth.

On 28 August 2014 it passes to definitive title to the Barletta.

On 27 July 2015, after having been released because of the failure of the Pugliese club, he was hired by Matera. [8] On 1 June 2016 renews with the biancazzurra team until 2019.

On 17 July 2019 he returned to Reggina on a 2-year contract. After winning promotion on his first season back at Reggina and playing the first half of the 2020–21 Serie B season with the Calabrians, he left in January 2021 to join Serie C's Palermo. In the 2021–22 Serie C season, he captained the Rosanero into winning promotion to Serie B as playoff winners.

On 12 August 2022, De Rose left Palermo to join Serie C promotion hopefuls Cesena on a two-year contract, reuniting with his former manager Domenico Toscano.

Following Cesena's promotion to Serie B, on 30 August 2024 De Rose moved to Catania.

== Career statistics ==
=== Club ===
As of 12 June 2022

Appearances and goals by club, season and competition
Club	Season	League			National cup		Other		Total	
Club	Season	Division	Apps	Goals	Apps	Goals	Apps	Goals	Apps	Goals
San Fili	2005–06	Promozione	?	0	—		—		?	0
Cosenza	2006–07	Serie D	30	0	0	0	0	0	30	0
Cosenza	2007–08	Serie D	29	0	0	0	2	0	31	0
Cosenza	2008–09	Lega Pro Seconda Divisione	30	0	3	0	2	0	35	0
Cosenza	2009–10	Lega Pro Prima Divisione	28	0	2+4	0	—		34	0
Cosenza	2010–11	Lega Pro Prima Divisione	21	2	2+3	0	—		26	2
Cosenza	Total		138	2	14	0	4	0	156	2
Reggina	2010–11	Serie B	15	0	0	0	2 (Note: All appearance(s) in promotion play-offs.)	0	17	0
Reggina	2011–12	Serie B	23	0	2	0	—		25	0
Reggina	2013–14	Serie B	14	0	3	0	—		17	0
Lecce (loan)	2012–13	Lega Pro Prima Divisione	25	4	2	0	2	0	29	4
Lecce (loan)	2013–14	Lega Pro Prima Divisione	5	0	0	0	2	0	7	0
Lecce (loan)	Total		30	4	2	0	4	0	36	4
Barletta	2014–15	Lega Pro	31	2	0	0	—		31	2
Matera	2015–16	Lega Pro	31	1	1	0	—		32	1
Matera	2016–17	Lega Pro	31	2	2+6	0	2	0	41	2
Matera	Total		62	3	9	0	2	0	73	3
Casertana	2017–18	Serie C	32	4	0	0	2	0	34	4
Südtirol	2018–19	Serie C	36	0	3	0	2	0	41	0
Reggina	2019–20	Serie C	23	0	2	0	—		25	0
Reggina	2020–21	Serie B	9	0	1	0	—		10	0
Reggina	Reggina total		84	0	8	0	2	0	94	0
Palermo	2020–21	Serie C	17	0	—		4	0	21	0
Palermo	2021–22	Serie C	34	0	3	0	7	0	44	0
Palermo	Total		51	0	3	0	11	0	65	0
Career total			464+	15	39	0	27	0	530+	15
