= Mamadou Kanouté =

Senegalese footballer (born 1993)

Personal information
- Full name: Mamadou Yaye Kanouté
- Date of birth: 7 October 1993 (age 33)
- Place of birth: Dakar, Senegal
- Height: 1.74 m (5 ft 8 1/2 in)
- Position: Forward

Team information
- Current team: Picerno
- Number: 7

Youth career
- –2011: Tor di Quinto

Senior career*
Years	Team	Apps	(Gls)
2011–2018	Benevento	29	(0)
2012–2013	→ Valle d'Aosta (loan)	24	(1)
2015–2016	→ Ischia (loan)	27	(7)
2016–2017	→ Juve Stabia (loan)	31	(7)
2018	→ Pro Vercelli (loan)	8	(0)
2018–2020	Catanzaro	48	(10)
2020–2021	Palermo	31	(1)
2021–2023	Avellino	57	(5)
2023–2024	Taranto	37	(13)
2024–2026	Trapani	20	(2)
2025–2026	→ Perugia (loan)	25	(4)
2026	→ Picerno (loan)	10	(0)
2026–	Picerno	0	(0)
- * Club domestic league appearances and goals as of 28 August 2026

Mamadou Yaye Kanouté (born 7 October 1993) is a Senegalese professional footballer who plays as a forward for Serie C Group C club Picerno.

== Career ==
=== Serie C ===
==== Benevento ====
He made his Serie C debut for Benevento on 23 October 2011 in a game against Pisa.

==== Loan to Ischia ====
On 30 July 2015, he was loaned to Lega Pro club Ischia along with Antonio Porcino.

==== Taranto ====
In the summer of 2023, Kanouté is made official as Serie C Group C club Taranto's new player. In Taranto he lived one of his best seasons as a footballer, becoming the team's top scorer in that season under head coach Ezio Capuano.

=== Trapani ===
Following his impressive season at Taranto, in July 2024, ambitious Serie C club Trapani signed Kanouté by activating a buyout clause on his contract with the Apulians. On 2 February 2025, Kanouté was sent to Perugia on loan, with an obligation to buy in case of Perugia's promotion to Serie B.

== Career statistics ==
=== Club ===
As of 26 May 2021

Appearances and goals by club, season and competition
Club	Season	League			National cup		Other		Total	
Club	Season	Division	Apps	Goals	Apps	Goals	Apps	Goals	Apps	Goals
Benevento	2011–12	Lega Pro Prima Divisione	13	0	2	0	—		15	0
Benevento	2013–14	Lega Pro Prima Divisione	1	0	1	0	0	0	2	0
Benevento	2014–15	Lega Pro	13	0	2+1	0	—		16	0
Benevento	2017–18	Serie A	2	0	0	0	—		2	0
Benevento	Total		29	0	6	0	0	0	35	0
Vallée d'Aoste (loan)	2012–13	Lega Pro Seconda Divisione	24	1	2	1	0	0	26	2
Ischia (loan)	2015–16	Lega Pro	27	7	2	1	2 (Note: All appearance(s) in relegation play-outs.)	1	31	9
Juve Stabia (loan)	2016–17	Lega Pro	31	7	1+1	0	1 (Note: All appearance(s) in promotion play-offs.)	0	34	7
Pro Vercelli (loan)	2017–18	Serie B	8	0	0	0	—		8	0
Catanzaro	2018–19	Serie C	22	4	1	0	1	0	24	4
Catanzaro	2019–20	Serie C	26	6	2+2	1+0	2	0	32	7
Catanzaro	Total		48	10	5	1	3	0	56	11
Palermo	2020–21	Serie C	31	1	—		4	0	35	1
Avellino	2021–22	Serie C	0	0	0	0	—		0	0
Career total			198	26	17	3	10	1	225	30
