= Michele Somma =

Italian footballer (born 1995)

Personal information
- Date of birth: 16 March 1995 (age 31)
- Place of birth: Salerno, Italy
- Height: 1.82 m (6 ft 0 in)
- Position: Centre back

Team information
- Current team: Piacenza
- Number: 15

Youth career
- 2009–2012: Juventus
- 2012–2014: Roma

Senior career*
Years	Team	Apps	(Gls)
2014–2015	Roma	1	(0)
2015	→ Empoli (loan)	1	(0)
2015–2018	Brescia	60	(0)
2018–2020	Deportivo La Coruña	24	(2)
2020–2022	Palermo	27	(1)
2022–2023	Catania	24	(1)
2023–	Piacenza	0	(0)

International career^{‡}
2010	Italy U16	3	(0)
2013	Italy U18	3	(0)
2013–2014	Italy U19	13	(0)
2014–2015	Italy U20	9	(1)
2015–2016	Italy U21	2	(0)
- * Club domestic league appearances and goals as of 20 December 2023 ‡ National team caps and goals as of 10 November 2016

Michele Somma (born 16 March 1995) is an Italian footballer who plays as a central defender for Serie D Group B club Piacenza.

== Club career ==
Somma joined Brescia Calcio in a temporary deal on 10 July 2015. On 1 February 2016, Roma signed Ismail H'Maidat from Brescia for €3.15 million, with Somma (for €1.8 million) and Emanuele Ndoj (for €1.2 million) moved to opposite direction.

In August 2018 he signed for Deportivo La Coruña in Spain, playing two seasons in the Segunda División league. He left Spain for Serie C club Palermo in the summer of 2020.

On 1 September 2022, Palermo announced to have terminated Somma's contracted by mutual consent. A few days later, Somma signed for Serie D regional rivals Catania on a free transfer.

On 15 December 2023, Somma joined Serie D club Piacenza until the end of the season, with an option for the 2024–25 season.

== International career ==
Somma has represented Italy from under-16 to under-20 level. He featured in their 2014 UEFA European Under-19 Championship qualifying campaign.

On 12 August 2015, he made his debut with Italy U21 side, in a friendly match against Hungary.

== Career statistics ==
=== Club ===
As of match played 16 April 2023

Appearances and goals by club, season and competition
Club	Season	League			National cup (Note: Includes Coppa Italia, Copa del Rey)		Other		Total	
Club	Season	Division	Apps	Goals	Apps	Goals	Apps	Goals	Apps	Goals
Roma	2014–15	Serie A	1	0	0	0	—		1	0
Empoli (loan)	2014–15	Serie A	1	0	0	0	—		1	0
Brescia (loan)	2015–16	Serie B	6	0	2	0	—		8	0
Brescia	2016–17	Serie B	18	0	1	0	—		19	0
Brescia	2017–18	Serie B	36	0	2	0	—		38	0
Brescia	Total		60	0	5	0	0	0	65	0
Deportivo La Coruña	2018–19	Segunda División	10	1	1	0	3 (Note: Appearances in Segunda División play-offs)	0	14	1
Deportivo La Coruña	2019–20	Segunda División	14	1	1	0	—		15	1
Deportivo La Coruña	Total		24	2	2	0	3	0	29	2
Palermo	2020–21	Serie C	21	1	—		0	0	21	1
Palermo	2021–22	Serie C	6	0	0	0	1 (Note: Appearances in Serie C play-offs)	0	7	0
Palermo	2022–23	Serie B	0	0	1	0	0	0	1	0
Palermo	Total		27	1	1	0	1	0	29	1
Catania	2022–23	Serie D	24	1	—		0	0	24	1
Catania	Career total		137	4	8	0	4	0	149	4

== Personal life ==
He is the son of football coach Mario Somma.
