= Nicola Valente =

Italian footballer

Personal information
- Date of birth: 6 October 1991 (age 35)
- Place of birth: Zevio, Italy
- Height: 1.70 m (5 ft 7 in)
- Position: Winger

Team information
- Current team: Mestre
- Number: 30

Senior career*
Years	Team	Apps	(Gls)
2010–2015	Legnago	144	(32)
2015–2016	Pordenone	18	(1)
2016–2017	Siracusa	32	(6)
2017–2018	Sambenedettese	32	(1)
2018–2020	Carrarese	59	(8)
2020–2024	Palermo	103	(15)
2024–2025	Padova	22	(1)
2025–2026	Siracusa	31	(1)
2026–	Mestre	0	(0)
- * Club domestic league appearances and goals as of 10 November 2026

Nicola Valente (born 6 October 1991) is an Italian footballer who plays as a winger for Italian Serie D club Mestre.

== Club career ==
Valente started his career with Serie D club Legnago, with whom he played five seasons as an amateur from 2010 to 2015. In 2015, he moved to Serie C club Pordenone, with whom he made his debut as a professional player.

On 13 August 2020 he joined Palermo. With the Sicilians, he immediately took on a leading role, being a regular in both Serie C seasons, the last of which culminating with promotion to Serie B. He subsequently agreed to extend his contract with Palermo for one more season, thus ensuring himself the opportunity to debut in the Italian second division at 30.

In March 2023, after another season as a regular for the Rosanero on his Serie B debut, Valente agreed upon another one-year contract extension with Palermo.

On 1 February 2024, Valente left Palermo to join Serie C club Padova. He signed a contract with Padova until 30 June 2026.

After winning promotion to Serie B with Padova, on 29 August 2025, Valente returned to Sicily, signing for Serie C club Siracusa.

== Career statistics ==
=== Club ===
As of 1 February 2024

Appearances and goals by club, season and competition
Club	Season	League			National cup		Other		Total	
Club	Season	Division	Apps	Goals	Apps	Goals	Apps	Goals	Apps	Goals
Legnago	2010–11	Serie D	29	2	?	0	—		29+	2
Legnago	2011–12	Serie D	18	5	1	0	2+	0	21+	5
Legnago	2012–13	Serie D	32	9	1	0	—		33	9
Legnago	2013–14	Serie D	33	9	?	0	—		33+	9
Legnago	2014–15	Serie D	32	7	1	1	—		33	8
Legnago	Total		144	32	3+	1	2+	0	149+	33
Pordenone	2015–16	Lega Pro	18	1	2	0	3 (Note: All appearance(s) in promotion play-offs.)	0	23	1
Siracusa	2016–17	Lega Pro	32	6	2	0	1	0	35	6
Sambenedettese	2017–18	Serie C	32	1	2+2	1+2	4	0	40	4
Carrarese	2018–19	Serie C	34	2	1+2	0+1	4	1	41	4
Carrarese	2019–20	Serie C	25	6	2	1	2	1	29	8
Carrarese	Total		59	8	5	2	6	2	70	12
Palermo	2020–21	Serie C	31	5	—		4	1	35	6
Palermo	2021–22	Serie C	30	7	2	1	8	0	40	8
Palermo	2022–23	Serie B	32	3	1	0	—		33	3
Palermo	2023–24	Serie B	10	0	1	0	—		11	0
Palermo	Total		103	15	4	1	12	1	119	17
Career total			388	63	20+	7	28+	3	436+	73
