= Antonio Romano (footballer, born 1996) =

Italian footballer (born 1996)

Personal information
- Date of birth: 23 March 1996 (age 30)
- Place of birth: Cercola, Italy
- Height: 1.80 m (5 ft 11 in)
- Position: Midfielder

Youth career
- Napoli

Senior career*
Years	Team	Apps	(Gls)
2015–2019	Napoli	0	(0)
2015–2016	→ Santarcangelo (loan)	21	(0)
2016–2017	→ Prato (loan)	23	(4)
2017	→ Carpi (loan)	3	(0)
2018–2019	→ Casertana (loan)	42	(1)
2019–2020	Pianese	2	(0)
2020–2021	Turris	33	(6)
2021–2022	Pistoiese	20	(1)
2022	→ Imolese (loan)	13	(2)
2022–2024	Taranto	51	(4)
2024–2026	Giugliano	19	(0)

International career
2012	Italy U-16	4	(0)
2012	Italy U-17	5	(0)
2013–2014	Italy U-18	6	(0)
- * Club domestic league appearances and goals as of 1 May 2026

Antonio Romano (born 23 March 1996) is an Italian professional footballer who plays as a midfielder.

== Club career ==
Romano made his professional debut in the Lega Pro for Santarcangelo on 17 January 2016 in a game against Arezzo. On 29 January 2018, he joins Casertana on loan.

On 23 November 2019, he signed with Serie C club Pianese.

On 12 July 2020 he joined Turris.

On 26 August 2021, he moved to Pistoiese. On 31 January 2022, Romano was loaned to Imolese until 30 June 2023, with an option to buy.

On 18 August 2022, Romano moved to Taranto on a permanent basis.

On 19 January 2024, Romano signed a two-year contract with Giugliano.

== International career ==
Romano represented the Italy national under-17 football team at the 2013 FIFA U-17 World Cup.
