= Giordano Trovade =

Italian footballer (born 1998)

Personal information
- Date of birth: 23 May 1998 (age 28)
- Place of birth: Este, Italy
- Height: 1.75 m (5 ft 9 in)
- Position: Midfielder

Team information
- Current team: Mestre
- Number: 23

Youth career
- –2014: Padova
- 2014–2017: Bologna

Senior career*
Years	Team	Apps	(Gls)
2017–2019	Bologna	0	(0)
2018	→ Mosta (loan)	5	(1)
2018–2019	→ Ravenna (loan)	23	(1)
2019–2020	Südtirol	14	(0)
2020	Bisceglie	7	(0)
2020–2021	Campodarsego	21	(3)
2021	Follonica Gavorrano	13	(1)
2021–2022	Pianese	18	(2)
2022–2024	Prato	63	(4)
2024–2025	Fiorenzuola	14	(1)
2025–	Mestre	43	(1)
- * Club domestic league appearances and goals as of 10 November 2026

Giordano Trovade (born 23 May 1998) is an Italian professional footballer who plays as a midfielder for Serie D club Mestre.

== Club career ==
He made his Serie C debut for Ravenna on 26 September 2018 in a game against Triestina.

On 14 July 2019, he joined Serie C club Südtirol on a one-year contract.

On 24 January 2020, he moved to Bisceglie.
