= Moses Odjer =

Ghanaian footballer

Personal information
- Full name: Moses Odjer
- Date of birth: 16 August 1996 (age 30)
- Place of birth: Tema, Ghana
- Height: 1.71 m (5 ft 7 in)
- Position: Central midfielder

Team information
- Current team: Siena
- Number: 37

Youth career
- Tema Youth

Senior career*
Years	Team	Apps	(Gls)
2012–2014	Tema Youth	14	(1)
2014–2015	Catania	11	(0)
2015–2020	Salernitana	103	(1)
2020	Trapani	11	(0)
2020–2022	Palermo	52	(0)
2022–2024	Foggia	46	(0)
2024–2025	Pianese	20	(2)
2025	Ascoli	12	(1)
2025–2026	Livorno	26	(0)
2026–	Siena	0	(0)

International career
2013	Ghana U20	10	(2)
- * Club domestic league appearances and goals as of 30 April 2026

Moses Odjer (born 17 August 1996) is a Ghanaian professional footballer who plays as a central midfielder for Serie D club Siena.

== Club career ==
Odjer started playing for local Tema Youth, and made his senior debuts for the club in 2012, aged only 16. On 26 August 2014 he signed a five-year deal with Italian side Calcio Catania, freshly relegated to Serie B.

Odjer played his first match as a professional on 29 November 2014, replacing injured Alexis Rolín in a 0–1 away loss against Ternana Calcio.

In summer 2015 Odjer left for Salernitana on loan, with an option to sign him outright. On 22 June 2016 Salernitana excised the option.

On 23 January 2020, he moved to Serie B club Trapani.

On 19 September 2020, he joined Serie C powerhouse Palermo on a free transfer.

He left Palermo in June 2022 as his contract was not extended following the Rosanero's promotion to Serie B in the 2021–22 Serie C playoff tournament. He successively signed a two-year contract for Foggia, another Serie C club.

In August 2024, Odjer joined Pianese.

== Career statistics ==
=== Club ===
As of 12 June 2022

Appearances and goals by club, season and competition
Club	Season	League			National cup		Other		Total	
Club	Season	Division	Apps	Goals	Apps	Goals	Apps	Goals	Apps	Goals
Tema Youth	2012–13	Ghana Premier League	14	1	?	?	—		14+	1+
Tema Youth	2013–14	Division One League	?	?	?	?	?	?	?	?
Tema Youth	Total		14+	1+	?	?	?	?	14+	1+
Catania	2014–15	Serie B	11	0	0	0	—		11	0
Catania	2015–16	Lega Pro	0	0	2	0	—		2	0
Catania	Total		11	0	2	0	0	0	13	0
Salernitana	2015–16 (loan)	Serie B	26	1	1	0	2 (Note: All appearance(s) in relegation play-outs.)	0	29	1
Salernitana	2016–17	Serie B	26	0	1	0	—		27	0
Salernitana	2017–18	Serie B	25	0	2	0	—		27	0
Salernitana	2018–19	Serie B	15	0	2	1	2	0	19	1
Salernitana	2019–20	Serie B	11	0	0	0	—		11	0
Salernitana	Total		103	1	6	1	4	0	113	2
Trapani	2019–20	Serie B	11	0	0	0	—		11	0
Palermo	2020–21	Serie C	26	0	—		0	0	26	0
Palermo	2021–22	Serie C	27	0	3	0	4 (Note: All appearance(s) in promotion play-offs.)	0	34	0
Palermo	Total		53	0	3	0	4	0	60	0
Career total			192+	2+	11+	1+	8+	0+	211+	3+
