= Jérémie Broh =

Italian footballer

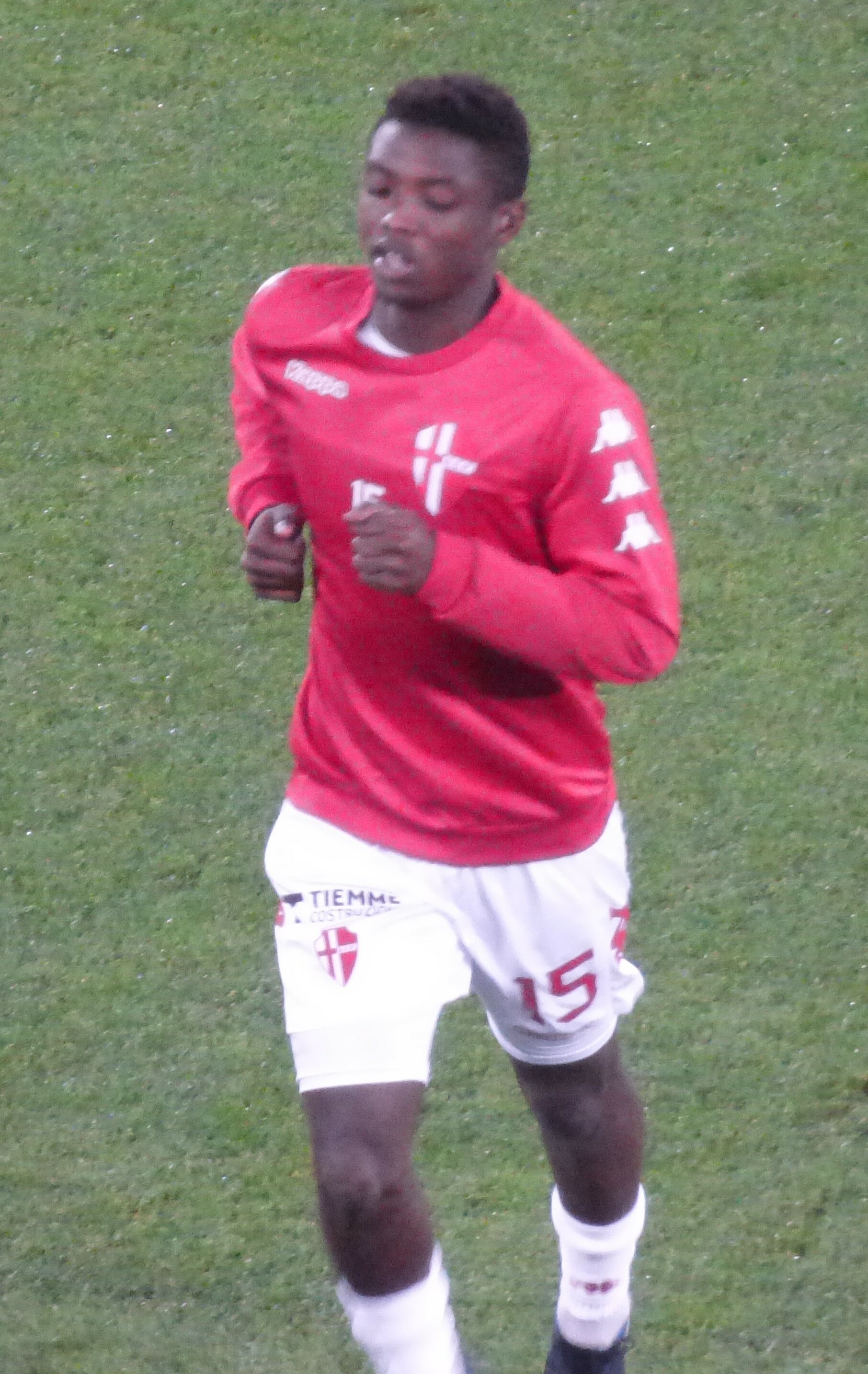
- Broh in 2018

Personal information
- Full name: Jérémie Delphin Broh Tonye
- Date of birth: 21 March 1997 (age 29)
- Place of birth: Parma, Italy
- Height: 1.80 m (5 ft 11 in)
- Position: Midfielder

Team information
- Current team: Giugliano
- Number: 6

Youth career
- Coopnordest
- 2007–2015: Parma
- 2015–2016: Sassuolo

Senior career*
Years	Team	Apps	(Gls)
2015	Parma	1	(0)
2016–2020	Sassuolo	0	(0)
2016–2017	→ Pordenone (loan)	9	(0)
2017–2018	→ Südtirol (loan)	37	(0)
2018–2019	→ Padova (loan)	17	(0)
2019–2020	→ Cosenza (loan)	18	(1)
2020–2024	Palermo	56	(0)
2021–2022	→ Südtirol (loan)	36	(4)
2023–2024	→ Südtirol (loan)	17	(0)
2024–2025	Padova	6	(0)
2025–2026	Perugia	23	(0)
2026–	Giugliano	9	(0)

International career
2014	Italy U18	2	(0)
- * Club domestic league appearances and goals as of 1 May 2026

Jérémie Delphin Broh Tonye (born 21 March 1997) is an Italian professional footballer who plays as a midfielder for Serie C Group C club Giugliano.

== Club career ==
Broh made his Serie A debut for Parma on 18 May 2015 in a game against Fiorentina.

On 30 July 2019, he joined Cosenza on loan.

On 25 September 2020 he signed a three-year contract with Palermo.

On 31 August 2021, he was loaned to Südtirol. After winning promotion to Serie B with Südtirol, Broh returned to Palermo, being named part of the first team squad for the 2022–23 Serie B season.

On 11 August 2023, Broh returned to Südtirol on another loan.

On 30 August 2024, Broh returned to Padova on a two-year deal.

== Career statistics ==
=== Club ===
As of 26 May 2021

Appearances and goals by club, season and competition
Club	Season	League			National cup		Other		Total	
Club	Season	Division	Apps	Goals	Apps	Goals	Apps	Goals	Apps	Goals
Parma	2014–15	Serie A	1	0	0	0	—		1	0
Sassuolo	2015–16	Serie A	0	0	0	0	—		0	0
Pordenone (loan)	2016–17	Lega Pro	9	0	1+1	0	—		11	0
Südtirol (loan)	2016–17	Lega Pro	12	0	0	0	—		12	0
Südtirol (loan)	2017–18	Serie C	25	0	2	0	4 (Note: All appearance(s) in promotion play-offs.)	0	31	0
Südtirol (loan)	Total		37	0	2	0	4	0	43	0
Padova (loan)	2018–19	Serie B	17	0	1	0	—		18	0
Cosenza (loan)	2019–20	Serie B	18	1	1	0	—		19	1
Palermo	2020–21	Serie C	26	0	—		2	0	28	0
Südtirol (loan)	2021–22	Serie C	0	0	0	0	—		0	0
Career total			108	1	6	0	6	0	120	1
