= Niccolò Corrado =

Italian footballer (born 2000)

Personal information
- Date of birth: 19 March 2000 (age 26)
- Place of birth: Florence, Italy
- Height: 1.79 m (5 ft 10 in)
- Position: Left-back

Team information
- Current team: Empoli (on loan from Frosinone)
- Number: 91

Youth career
- Robur Scandicci
- –2016: Prato
- 2016–2019: Inter Milan

Senior career*
Years	Team	Apps	(Gls)
2019–2022	Inter Milan	0	(0)
2019–2020	→ Arezzo (loan)	20	(1)
2020–2021	→ Palermo (loan)	7	(0)
2021–2022	→ Feralpisalò (loan)	34	(1)
2022–2024	Ternana	53	(1)
2024	→ Modena (loan)	17	(0)
2024–2025	Brescia	36	(1)
2025–	Frosinone	16	(3)
2026–	→ Empoli (loan)	4	(0)

International career
2016–2017	Italy U17	5	(0)
2017–2018	Italy U18	13	(1)
2018–2019	Italy U19	7	(0)
- * Club domestic league appearances and goals as of 20 September 2026

Niccolò Corrado (born 19 March 2000) is an Italian professional footballer who plays as a left-back for Serie B club Empoli, on loan from Frosinone.

== Club career ==
=== Inter Milan ===
He joined the Inter Milan youth academy in the summer of 2016 from Prato.

From the 2017–18 season, he began playing for Inter Milab's Under-19 squad.

==== Loan to Arezzo ====
On 21 August 2019, Corrado was loaned to Serie C club Arezzo on a season-long loan deal. Ten days later, on 31 August, he made his professional debut in Serie C for Arezzo in a 1–0 away defeat against Pianese, he was replaced by Samuele Sereni after 55 minutes. Three more weeks later, on 19 October, he played his first entire match for the club, a 1–1 home draw against Alessandria. On 25 November, Corrado scored his first professional goal in the 55th minute of a 3–1 home win over Novara. Corrado ended his season-long loan to Arezzo with 20 appearances, all as a starter, and 1 goal. Arezzo reach the play-off, however the club was elibimated by Robur Siena in the first round but he had not been called up for the match.

==== Loan to Palermo ====
On 3 September 2020, Corrado was loaned to Serie C club Palermo on a season-long loan deal. Three weeks later, on 27 September, he made his debut for the club as a substitute replacing Roberto Crivello in the 63rd minute of a 2–0 away defeat against Teramo. On 9 November he played his first entire match for Palermo, a 1–1 home draw against Catania. Corrado ended his season-long loan to Palermo with only 7 appearances, 4 of them as a starter, all in the first part of the loan, during the season he remained an unused substitute 11 times. Corrado also helped the club to reach the play-off; however, Palermo was eliminated by Avellino 1–1 on aggregate in the round of 16, and he remained on the bench for both matches.

==== Loan to Feralpisalò ====
On 21 July 2021, Corrado was signed by Serie C side Feralpisalò on a season-long loan deal.

=== Ternana ===
On 5 July 2022, Corrado joined Ternana on a permanent deal. On 9 January 2024, Corrado was loaned by Modena for the rest of the season.

=== Brescia ===
On 8 July 2024, Corrado signed a four-year contract with Brescia. Brescia went bankrupt at the end of the 2024–25 season, making him a free agent.

=== Frosinone ===
On 17 July 2025, Corrado joined Frosinone in Serie B, with a three-year contract.

== International career ==
He was first called up to represent his country in 2016 for Under-17 squad friendlies.

He was selected for the 2019 UEFA European Under-19 Championship squad and made two late substitute appearances as Italy was eliminated at the group stage.

== Career statistics ==
=== Club ===
As of 29 May 2022

Club	Season	League			National cup		Europe		Other		Total	
Club	Season	League	Apps	Goals	Apps	Goals	Apps	Goals	Apps	Goals	Apps	Goals
Arezzo (loan)	2019–20	Serie C	20	1	1	0	—		—		21	1
Palermo (loan)	2020–21	Serie C	7	0	0	0	—		—		7	0
Feralpisalò (loan)	2021–22	Serie C	34	1	2	0	—		6 (Note: All appearance(s) in Serie C play-offs.)	0	42	1
Career total			61	2	2	0	—		6	0	70	2

== Honours ==
=== Club ===
Inter Primavera

- Campionato Primavera 1: 2017–18
- Supercoppa Primavera: 2018
- Torneo di Viareggio: 2018
