= Abbagnale =

Abbagnale (Italian pronunciation: [abbaɲˈɲale]) is an Italian surname. Notable people with the surname include:

- Agostino Abbagnale (born 1966), Italian rower
- Carmine Abbagnale (born 1962), Italian rower
- Giuseppe Abbagnale (born 1959), Italian rower
- Vincenzo Abbagnale (born 1993), Italian rower

== See also ==
- Abagnale (surname)
