= Domenico Giampà =

Italian footballer (born 1977)

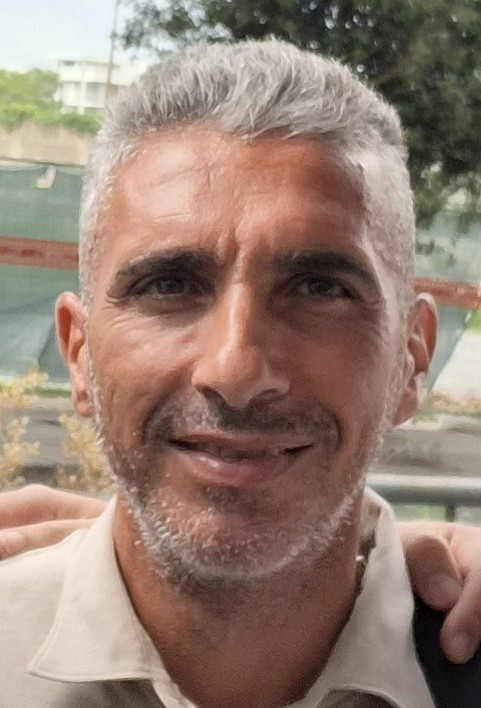
- Giampà in Nola, 2025

Personal information
- Date of birth: February 15, 1977 (age 49)
- Place of birth: Girifalco, Italy
- Height: 1.68 m (5 ft 6 in)
- Position: Midfielder

Youth career
- Catanzaro

Senior career*
Years	Team	Apps	(Gls)
1994–1996	Catanzaro	3	(0)
1996–1998	Crotone	64	(0)
1998–1999	Lucchese	28	(0)
1999–2002	Crotone	99	(7)
2002–2004	Ternana	54	(1)
2004–2005	Messina	62	(5)
2005–2007	Ascoli	20	(0)
2007–2008	Modena	32	(0)
2008	Salernitana	11	(0)
2009–2011	Modena	45	(3)
2012	Catanzaro	14	(3)
2012–2013	Como	26	(3)
2013	Paganese	9	(0)
2014	Vigor Lamezia	15	(0)
2015–2016	Catanzaro	17	(1)
Total		499	(23)

Managerial career
- 2017–2018: Roccella
- 2021–2022: Sant'Agata
- 2022–2023: Paganese
- 2023: San Marzano
- 2024–2025: Gelbison
- 2025–2026: Nola
- 2026–: Turris
- * Club domestic league appearances and goals

Domenico Giampà (born 15 February 1977) is an Italian football coach and former footballer. He is currently as a head coach for Italian Serie D club Turris.

== Playing career ==
A versatile central midfielder, Giampà started his career with Catanzaro. In 2004 he won his first Serie A promotion with Sicilian club Messina, doing his top flight debut in the following 2004–05 Serie A season.

Giampà successively made nationwide news after sustaining a serious injury during a Serie A game against Lecce, during which he got a severe leg injury while crashing against a billboard that required to be sutured with a total of 147 stitches.

In January 2006 he moved to another Serie A club, Ascoli.

Giampà retired from active football in 2016 following two seasons back at Catanzaro.

== Coaching career ==
In 2017–18, Giampà served as head coach of Calabrian amateurs Roccella. Successively he became a youth coach at Catanzaro for the 2019–20 season.

On 8 January 2021 he moved back to Sicily, becoming the new head coach of Serie D club Sant'Agata.
