= Nicolò Verzeni =

Italian footballer

Personal information
- Date of birth: 6 February 2002 (age 24)
- Place of birth: Clusone, Italy
- Height: 1.79 m (5 ft 10 in)
- Position: Right-back

Team information
- Current team: Mestre
- Number: 28

Youth career
- –2020: Inter Milan
- 2020–2021: Brescia

Senior career*
Years	Team	Apps	(Gls)
2020–2021	Brescia	5	(0)
2021–2023	Pergolettese	22	(0)
2023–2025	Breno	60	(10)
2025–2026	Legnago	35	(5)
2026–	Mestre	0	(0)
- * Club domestic league appearances and goals as of 6 November 2026

Nicolò Verzeni (born 6 February 2002) is an Italian footballer who plays as a right-back for Serie D club Mestre.

== Club career ==
Verzeni made his senior debut for Brescia on 28 October 2020 in a Coppa Italia game against Perugia. He made his Serie B debut on 8 December 2020, starting in a game against Cremonese.

On 21 December 2020 he signed his first professional contract with Brescia.

On 14 July 2021, he joined Serie C club Pergolettese.
