= Andrea Palazzi =

Italian footballer (born 1996)

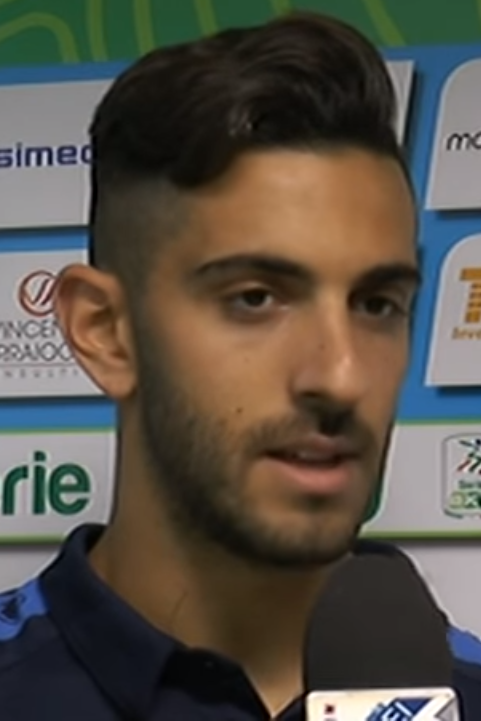
- Palazzi with Pescara in 2018

Personal information
- Date of birth: 24 February 1996 (age 30)
- Place of birth: Milan, Italy
- Height: 1.78 m (5 ft 10 in)
- Position: Midfielder

Team information
- Current team: Pro Palazzolo

Youth career
- 2006–2014: Inter Milan

Senior career*
Years	Team	Apps	(Gls)
2014–2020	Inter Milan	0	(0)
2015–2016	→ Livorno (loan)	11	(0)
2016–2017	→ Pro Vercelli (loan)	30	(1)
2017–2019	→ Pescara (loan)	13	(0)
2019–2020	→ Monza (loan)	19	(4)
2020–2021	Monza	0	(0)
2020–2021	→ Palermo (loan)	24	(0)
2021–2022	Alessandria	6	(0)
2022–2023	Feralpisalò	24	(0)
2023–2024	Pro Sesto	20	(0)
2024–2025	Pro Patria	17	(0)
2025–	Pro Palazzolo	0	(0)

International career
2013	Italy U17	13	(0)
2013–2014	Italy U18	6	(0)
2014–2015	Italy U19	6	(0)
2015–2016	Italy U20	9	(1)
- * Club domestic league appearances and goals as of 25 April 2025

Andrea Palazzi (born 24 February 1996) is an Italian professional footballer who plays as a midfielder for Serie D club Pro Palazzolo. He began his youth career at Inter Milan aged 10, and was rated by Inter fans as a promising holding midfielder.

== Club career ==
=== Inter Milan ===
Palazzi made his professional debut on 6 November 2014, replacing Zdravko Kuzmanović for the last 7 minutes of a 1–1 draw at AS Saint-Étienne in the group stages of the UEFA Europa League.

==== Loan to Livorno ====
On 3 July 2015, Palazzi was signed by Livorno on a season-long loan. On 16 August he made his debut for Livorno in the third round of the Coppa Italia in a 2–0 away defeat against Carpi after extra time, he was replaced by Gianmario Comi in the 73rd minute. On 16 September, Palazzi made his Serie B debut as a substitute replacing Cristian Pasquato in the 82nd minute in a 3–1 home win over Brescia. On 17 October, Palazzi played his first match as a starter in Serie B, he was replaced by Mattia Aramu in the 46th minute of a 3–0 away defeat against Crotone. On 2 April 2016, he was handed a straight red card in a Serie B match against Vicenza. Palazzi ended his loan at Livorno with 12 appearances and 1 assist, but he never played an entire 90 minute match.

==== Loan to Pro Vercelli ====
On 7 July 2016, Palazzi was signed by Pro Vercelli on a season-long loan with an option to buy. On 7 August he made his debut for Pro Vercelli in the second round of Coppa Italia, in a 3–1 home win over Reggina. On 13 August, Palazzi played in the third round of the Coppa Italia in a 4–1 away defeat against Torino. On 27 August he made his Serie B debut for Pro Vercelli in a 1–1 home draw against Ascoli, he was replaced by Daniele Altobelli in the 77th minute. On 4 September he played his first full match for Pro Vercelli, a 1–1 away draw against Trapani. On 17 December Palazzi scored his first for Pro Vercelli in the 72nd minute of a 3–1 home win over SPAL. On 12 March 2017 he was sent off for a second yellow card in the 70th minute of a 0–0 away draw against Novara. Palazzi ended his season-long loan at Pro Vercelli with 32 appearances, 1 goal and 1 assist.

==== Loan to Pescara ====
On 1 July 2017, Palazzi was signed by the Serie B side Pescara with a season-long loan. On 27 August he made his debut for Pescara in Serie B as a substitute, replacing Mamadou Coulibaly in the 46th minute of a 5–1 home win over Foggia. On 14 October he played his first match as a starter for Pescara, a 1–0 away win over Parma, he was replaced by Luca Valzania in the 66th minute. On 21 October, Palazzi played his first full match for Pescara, a 2–1 home win over Avellino. Palazzi ended his loan to Pescara with only 9 appearances.

On 7 July 2018 his loan was extended for another season. On 5 August he played his first match of the season as a substitute replacing Ledian Memushaj in the 99th minute of a match won 4–3 at penalties after a 2–2 home draw against Pordenone in the second round of Coppa Italia. One week later he played in the third round in a 1–0 away defeat against ChievoVerona. On 27 October he played his first match in Serie B as a substitute replacing Manuel Marras in the 63rd minute of a 1–0 home defeat against Cittadella. In January 2019 his loan to Pescara was interrupted and Palazzi returned to Inter with only 6 appearances, but only 1 as a starter.

==== Loan to Monza ====
On 14 January 2019, Palazzi was loaned to Serie C club Monza with an 18-month loan deal. Five days later, on 19 January, he made his debut in Serie C as a substitute replacing Filippo Lora in the 64th minute and he scored his first goal for Monza and the winning goal in the 84th minute of a 1–0 home win over Virtus Verona. Three days later he played his first entire match for Monza, a 0–0 away draw against Renate.

=== Monza ===
==== Loan to Palermo ====
After being bought outright from Monza following their promotion to the Serie B, on 5 September 2020, Palazzi was sent on a one-year loan to newly promoted Serie C side Palermo.

=== Alessandria ===
Palazzi was sold to Alessandria on a permanent deal on 31 August 2021.

=== Feralpisalò ===
On 21 July 2022, Palazzi joined Feralpisalò for a term of one year, with an option to extend for two more years.

=== Pro Sesto ===
On 28 September 2023, Palazzi signed with Pro Sesto.

== Career statistics ==
=== Club ===
As of match played 26 May 2021

Appearances and goals by club, season and competition
Club	Season	League			National Cup (Note: Includes Coppa Italia)		Continental		Other		Total	
Club	Season	Division	Apps	Goals	Apps	Goals	Apps	Goals	Apps	Goals	Apps	Goals
Inter Milan	2014–15	Serie A	0	0	0	0	1 (Note: Appearance in UEFA Europa League)	0	—		1	0
Livorno (loan)	2015–16	Serie B	11	0	1	0	—		—		12	0
Pro Vercelli (loan)	2016–17	Serie B	30	1	2	0	—		—		32	1
Pescara (loan)	2017–18	Serie B	9	0	0	0	—		—		9	0
Pescara (loan)	2018–19	Serie B	4	0	2	0	—		—		6	0
Pescara (loan)	Total		13	0	2	0	0	0	0	0	15	0
Monza (loan)	2018–19	Serie C	14	3	0	0	—		3 (Note: Six appearances in Coppa Italia Serie C, three appearances in Serie C promotion play-offs)	0	23	3
Monza	2019–20	Serie C	5	1	1	0	—		1 (Note: Appearance in Serie C promotion play-offs)	0	7	1
Monza	Total		19	4	1	0	0	0	3	0	30	4
Palermo (loan)	2020–21	Serie C	24	0	—		—		0	0	24	0
Career total			97	5	6	0	1	0	3	0	114	5

== Honours ==
Inter

- Torneo di Viareggio: 2015

Monza

- Serie C Group A: 2019–20

Italy U17

- UEFA European Under-17 Championship runner-up:2013
