= Mattia Fallani =

Italian footballer

Personal information
- Date of birth: 31 March 2001 (age 25)
- Place of birth: Florence, Italy
- Height: 1.80 m (5 ft 11 in)
- Position: Goalkeeper

Team information
- Current team: Albalonga

Youth career
- –2018: Fiorentina
- 2018–2019: SPAL

Senior career*
| Years | Team | Apps | (Gls) |
| 2019–2021 | → Palermo (loan) | 3 | (0) |
| 2021–2022 | Grosseto | 1 | (0) |
| 2022–2023 | Recanatese | 29 | (0) |
| 2023–2024 | Renate | 26 | (0) |
| 2024–2025 | Turris | 2 | (0) |
| 2025–2026 | Taranto | | |
| 2026– | Albalonga | 4 | (0) |
- * Club domestic league appearances and goals as of 1 March 2026

Mattia Fallani (born 31 March 2001) is an Italian professional footballer who plays as a goalkeeper for Serie D club Albalonga.

== Club career ==
=== Youth club ===
Raised in Fiorentina first and in SPAL after, he never made his debut in the first team.

=== Palermo ===
On 9 August 2019, he joined Palermo, on loan. He made his debut with rosanero jersey on 11 September 2019, as a starter, in the Preliminary Round match of the Coppa Italia Serie D, lost 5-3 on penalties against Biancavilla. He concludes his only season with the rosanero, totaling four appearances between league and cup.

=== Grosseto ===
On 13 August 2021, he signed with Grosseto.

=== Recanatese ===
In July 2022, he moved to Recanatese.

== Career statistics ==
=== Club ===
As of 23 April 2022

Appearances and goals by club, season and competition
| Club | Season | League | | | National cup | | Other | | Total | |
| Club | Season | Division | Apps | Goals | Apps | Goals | Apps | Goals | Apps | Goals |
|---|---|---|---|---|---|---|---|---|---|---|
| Palermo (loan) | 2019–20 | Serie D | 3 | 0 | 1 | 0 | — | | 4 | 0 |
| Palermo (loan) | 2020–21 | Serie C | 0 | 0 | — | | 0 | 0 | 0 | 0 |
| Palermo (loan) | Total | | 3 | 0 | 1 | 0 | 0 | 0 | 4 | 0 |
| Grosseto | 2021–22 | Serie C | 1 | 0 | 1 | 0 | — | | 2 | 0 |
| Recanatese | 2022–23 | Serie C | 0 | 0 | 0 | 0 | — | | 0 | 0 |
| Career total | | | 4 | 0 | 2 | 0 | 0 | 0 | 6 | 0 |
