= Gregorio Luperini =

Italian footballer

Personal information
- Date of birth: 10 February 1994 (age 32)
- Place of birth: Pisa, Italy
- Height: 1.86 m (6 ft 1 in)
- Position: Midfielder

Team information
- Current team: Pistoiese
- Number: 17

Youth career
- Sampdoria

Senior career*
Years	Team	Apps	(Gls)
2013–2014	Sampdoria	0	(0)
2013–2014	→ Pontedera (loan)	9	(0)
2014–2015	Pontedera	31	(5)
2015–2016	Juventus	0	(0)
2015–2016	→ Pro Vercelli (loan)	2	(0)
2016	→ Pontedera (loan)	17	(0)
2016–2017	Cremonese	0	(0)
2016–2017	→ Pistoiese (loan)	24	(1)
2017–2019	Pistoiese	69	(15)
2019–2020	Trapani	30	(5)
2020–2022	Palermo	63	(9)
2022–2023	Perugia	35	(5)
2023–2024	Ternana	34	(4)
2024–2026	Catania	16	(0)
2026	→ Livorno (loan)	16	(0)
2026–	Pistoiese	0	(0)

International career
2010–2011	Italy U17	11	(1)
2011	Italy U18	3	(0)
- * Club domestic league appearances and goals as of 30 August 2026

Gregorio Luperini (born 10 February 1994) is an Italian professional footballer who plays as a midfielder for Serie D club Pistoiese.

== Club career ==
Born in Pisa, Tuscany, Luperini moved to Genoa for Serie A club Sampdoria at young age. In 2013, he was signed by Lega Pro club Pontedera in a temporary deal. on 2 July 2014 he was signed by Pontedera on a free transfer.

On 15 July 2015 Luperini was signed by defending Serie A champions Juventus for €100,000 transfer fee. He signed a 3-year contract. Luperini was immediately left for Serie B club Pro Vercelli. In January 2016 Luperini returned to Pontedera .

In July 2016, Luperini was signed by another third-tier club, Cremonese. He received the number 14 shirt of the first team. Luperini made his competitive debut for the club in the third round of Italian Cup, as a substitute of Simone Pesce.

However, on 31 August Luperini left for another Lega Pro club Pistoiese in another loan. He changed to wear no.17 shirt for Pistoiese.

On 17 July 2019, he signed a two-year contract with Serie B club Trapani. After playing a full season with Trapani, he was released for free following the club's exclusion from professional football. Shortly thereafter, he joined Serie C club Palermo on a free transfer.

After two seasons with Palermo, the last of which ended with the Rosanero achieving promotion to Serie B through playoffs, on 18 August 2022 Luperini transferred to Perugia, reuniting with his former Trapani coach Fabrizio Castori.

On 22 August 2023, Luperini signed a three-year contract with Ternana. After a single season with Ternana ended in relegation, on 19 July 2024 Luperini left Ternana to join Serie C club Catania on a three-year contract.

== Career statistics ==
=== Club ===
As of 12 June 2022

Appearances and goals by club, season and competition
Club	Season	League			National cup		Other		Total	
Club	Season	Division	Apps	Goals	Apps	Goals	Apps	Goals	Apps	Goals
Pontedera (loan)	2013–14	Lega Pro Prima Divisione	9	0	1	0	0	0	10	0
Pontedera (loan)	2014–15	Lega Pro	31	5	2+4	1+2	—		37	8
Pro Vercelli (loan)	2015–16	Serie B	2	0	0	0	—		2	0
Pontedera (loan)	2015–16	Lega Pro	17	0	0	0	—		17	0
Pontedera (loan)	Pontedera total		57	5	7	3	0	0	64	8
Cremonese	2016–17	Lega Pro	0	0	1	0	—		1	0
Pistoiese	2016–17 (loan)	Lega Pro	24	1	0	0	—		24	1
Pistoiese	2017–18	Serie C	34	5	0	0	1 (Note: All appearance(s) in promotion play-offs.)	0	35	5
Pistoiese	2018–19	Serie C	35	10	1+1	0+1	—		37	11
Pistoiese	Total		93	16	2	1	1	0	96	17
Trapani	2019–20	Serie B	30	5	2	0	—		32	5
Palermo	2020–21	Serie C	30	5	—		3	1	33	6
Palermo	2021–22	Serie C	33	4	3	1	8	2	44	7
Palermo	Total		63	9	3	1	11	3	77	13
Career total			245	35	15	5	12	3	272	43
