= Salvatore Aloi =

Italian footballer (born 1996)

Personal information
- Date of birth: 11 November 1996 (age 30)
- Place of birth: Melito di Porto Salvo, Italy
- Height: 1.75 m (5 ft 9 in)
- Position: Midfielder

Team information
- Current team: Catania
- Number: 4

Youth career
- –2014: Reggina

Senior career*
Years	Team	Apps	(Gls)
2014–2015	Reggina	0	(0)
2014–2015	→ Trapani (loan)	1	(0)
2015–2020	Trapani	52	(4)
2015–2016	→ Akragas (loan)	22	(0)
2016–2017	→ Lupa Roma (loan)	25	(0)
2020–2022	Avellino	62	(6)
2022–2024	Pescara	59	(3)
2024–2025	Ternana	27	(3)
2025–	Catania	5	(1)
- * Club domestic league appearances and goals as of 6 November 2025

Salvatore Aloi (born 11 November 1996) is an Italian professional footballer who plays as a midfielder for Serie C Group C club Catania.

== Club career ==
He made his Serie B debut for Trapani on 22 May 2015 in a game against Pro Vercelli.

On 15 September 2020, he joined Avellino on a 2-year contract.

On 18 August 2022, Aloi moved to Pescara.

On 23 July 2024, Aloi signed a two-season contract with Ternana.
