= Marco Soprano =

Italian footballer

Personal information
- Date of birth: 25 January 1996 (age 30)
- Place of birth: Venice, Italy
- Height: 1.89 m (6 ft 2 in)
- Position: Centre back

Team information
- Current team: Mestre
- Number: 6

Youth career
- –2015: Genoa

Senior career*
| Years | Team | Apps | (Gls) |
| 2015–2019 | Genoa | 0 | (0) |
| 2015–2016 | → Cosenza (loan) | 0 | (0) |
| 2016–2017 | → Bassano (loan) | 5 | (0) |
| 2017–2018 | → Fano (loan) | 13 | (0) |
| 2018–2019 | → Fermana (loan) | 32 | (0) |
| 2019–2022 | Teramo | 56 | (2) |
| 2022 | Trapani | 9 | (0) |
| 2022–2024 | Casertana | 32 | (1) |
| 2024– | Mestre | 55 | (5) |

International career
| 2011–2012 | Italy U16 | 2 | (0) |
- * Club domestic league appearances and goals as of 10 November 2026

Marco Soprano (born 25 January 1996) is an Italian footballer who plays as a centre back for Italian Serie D club Mestre.

== Club career ==
He made his Serie C debut for Bassano on 30 April 2016 in a game against Padova.

On 25 June 2019, he signed a 3-year contract with Teramo.

== International career ==
Soprano played two matches for Italy U16 between 2011 and 2012.
