= Leonardo Nunzella =

Italian footballer

Personal information
- Date of birth: 4 June 1992 (age 34)
- Place of birth: Brindisi, Italy
- Height: 1.74 m (5 ft 8 1/2 in)
- Position: Defender

Team information
- Current team: Brindisi
- Number: 21

Youth career
- –2010: Brindisi
- 2010–2012: Lecce

Senior career*
Years	Team	Apps	(Gls)
2009–2010	Brindisi	1	(0)
2012–2014	Lecce	4	(0)
2012–2013	→ Paganese (loan)	27	(0)
2014–2016	Virtus Lanciano	12	(0)
2015–2016	→ Catania (loan)	33	(2)
2016–2017	Parma	31	(0)
2017–2018	Pordenone	20	(0)
2019–2021	Virtus Francavilla	78	(4)
2021–2022	Fidelis Andria	22	(0)
2022–2024	Alessandria	64	(1)
2024–	Brindisi	11	(0)
- * Club domestic league appearances and goals as of 17 November 2024

Leonardo Nunzella (born 4 June 1992) is an Italian footballer who plays as a defender for Serie D club Brindisi.

== Career ==
He made his Serie C debut for Paganese on 9 September 2012 in a game against Sorrento.

On 3 January 2019, he joined Virtus Francavilla on a free transfer.

On 17 August 2021 he signed with Fidelis Andria.

On 1 September 2022, Nunzella joined Alessandria on a one-year contract.
