= Andrea Saraniti =

Italian footballer (born 1988)

Personal information
- Date of birth: 23 July 1988 (age 38)
- Place of birth: Palermo, Italy
- Height: 1.86 m (6 ft 1 in)
- Position: Forward

Senior career*
Years	Team	Apps	(Gls)
2006–2008	Akragas	36	(13)
2008–2009	Andrano	29	(6)
2009	Sorrento	7	(2)
2010	Sangiustese	7	(1)
2010–2011	Messina	3	(0)
2011–2012	Ragusa	25	(24)
2012–2013	Città di Messina	33	(14)
2013–2014	Akragas	33	(20)
2014–2015	Viterbese	25	(12)
2015–2017	Vibonese	64	(14)
2017–2018	Virtus Francavilla	20	(9)
2018–2020	Lecce	16	(5)
2018–2019	→ Viterbese (loan)	13	(1)
2019–2020	→ Vicenza (loan)	22	(3)
2020–2021	Palermo	27	(4)
2021–2022	Taranto	30	(10)
2022–2023	Casarano	22	(8)
2023	Lamezia Terme	5	(4)
2023–2024	Team Altamura	24	(7)
2024–2025	Casarano	29	(8)
- * Club domestic league appearances and goals as of 4 May 2025

Andrea Saraniti (born 23 July 1988) is an Italian footballer who plays as a striker.

== Club career ==
On 30 August 2019, Saraniti joined Vicenza on loan. On 13 August 2020, he joined Palermo.

On 2 August 2022, Saraniti signed with Casarano in Serie D.

== Career statistics ==
As of 20 July 2022

Appearances and goals by club, season and competition
Club	Season	League			National cup		Other		Total	
Club	Season	Division	Apps	Goals	Apps	Goals	Apps	Goals	Apps	Goals
Akragas	2006–07	Eccellenza	14	3			—		14+	3+
Akragas	2007–08	Eccellenza	22	10			1	0	23+	10+
Akragas	Total		36	13						
Adrano	2008–09	Serie D	29	6	1+	1		0	30+	7
Sorrento	2009–10	Lega Pro Prima Divisione	7	2	3	0	—		10	2
Sangiustese	2009–10	Lega Pro Seconda Divisione	7	1	—		—		7	1
Messina	2010–11	Serie D	3	0	—		—		3	0
Ragusa	2011–12	Eccellenza	25	24	1	0	—		26	24
Città di Messina	2012–13	Serie D	33	14	2+	1	0	0	35+	15
Akragas	2013–14	Serie D	33	20	6	4	5	1	44	25
Viterbese	2014–15	Serie D	25	12	2	0	3	1	30	13
Vibonese	2015–16	Serie D	32	7	2	1	1	0	35	8
Vibonese	2016–17	Lega Pro	32	7	3	2	1 (Note: All appearance(s) in relegation play-outs.)	0	36	9
Vibonese	Total		64	14	5	3	2	0	71	17
Virtus Francavilla	2017–18	Serie C	20	9	2	0	—		22	9
Lecce	2017–18	Serie C	13	5	0	0	2 (Note: All appearance(s) in Supercoppa di Serie C.)	0	15	5
Lecce	2018–19	Serie B	3	0	2	0	—		5	0
Lecce	Total		16	5	2	0	2	0	20	5
Viterbese (loan)	2018–19	Serie C	13	1	0	0	0	0	13	1
Vicenza (loan)	2019–20	Serie C	22	3	3	0	—		25	3
Palermo	2020–21	Serie C	27	4	—		4 (Note: All appearance(s) in promotion play-offs.)	1	31	5
Taranto	2021–22	Serie C	30	10	0	0	—		30	10
Career total			360	128	27+	9+	17+	3	434+	150+
