= Alessandro Abagnale =

Italian footballer (born 1998)

Personal information
- Date of birth: 21 September 1998 (age 28)
- Place of birth: Vico Equense, Italy
- Position: Goalkeeper

Team information
- Current team: Nuova Antoniana 2019

Youth career
- –2014: Genoa
- 2013–2014: → Juve Stabia (loan)
- 2014–2016: Carpi

Senior career*
| Years | Team | Apps | (Gls) |
| 2016–2017 | Turris | 45 | (0) |
| 2017–2019 | Audace Cerignola | 58 | (0) |
| 2019–2020 | AlbinoLeffe | 14 | (0) |
| 2020–2022 | Turris | 35 | (0) |
| 2024– | Nuova Antoniana 2019 | 1+ | (0) |
- * Club domestic league appearances and goals as of 4 April 2025

Alessandro Abagnale (born 21 September 1998) is an Italian footballer who plays as a goalkeeper for Seconda Categoria team Nuova Antoniana 2019.

== Career ==
=== Early career ===
Abagnale played in the youth academies of Juve Stabia, Genoa, and Carpi before beginning his senior career with Turris in 2016. In April 2016, he was called into the LND Under-18 camp, taking part in a friendly against Bologna's Under-19s. He would make more than 50 appearances for Turris across two seasons in Serie D, before joining Audace Cerignola in July 2017.

=== AlbinoLeffe ===
In September 2019, Abagnale joined Serie C club AlbinoLeffe. He made his professional debut for the club on 10 November 2019, keeping a clean sheet in a 1–0 victory over Pontedera. He would make a total of 14 appearances for the club during the 2019–20 season, as AlbinoLeffe finished 7th in Serie C's Girone A.

=== Turris ===
In August 2020, Abagnale returned to Turris, who had been promoted to the Italian third tier after the 2019–20 campaign. Abagnale became the team's starting goalkeeper, making 33 league appearances as Turris finished 14th in their first season back in Serie C. However, he would make just two appearances during the 2021–22 season and was released in July 2022.

== Career statistics ==
=== Club ===
As of match played 1 May 2022

Appearances and goals by club, season and competition
| Club | Season | League | | | Cup | | Other | | Total | |
| Club | Season | Division | Apps | Goals | Apps | Goals | Apps | Goals | Apps | Goals |
|---|---|---|---|---|---|---|---|---|---|---|
| AlbinoLeffe | 2019–20 | Serie C | 14 | 0 | — | | — | | 14 | 0 |
| AlbinoLeffe | Total | | 14 | 0 | — | | — | | 14 | 0 |
| Turris | 2020–21 | Serie C | 33 | 0 | — | | — | | 33 | 0 |
| Turris | 2021–22 | Serie C | 2 | 0 | — | | — | | 2 | 0 |
| Turris | Total | | 35 | 0 | — | | — | | 35 | 0 |
| Career total | | | 49 | 0 | — | | — | | 49 | 0 |
