= Danilo Gaeta =

Italian footballer (born 1999)

Personal information
- Date of birth: 9 March 1999 (age 27)
- Place of birth: Avellino, Italy
- Height: 1.75 m (5 ft 9 in)
- Position: Midfielder

Team information
- Current team: Nuova Sondrio
- Number: 35

Youth career
- Avellino
- –2018: Salernitana

Senior career*
Years	Team	Apps	(Gls)
2018–2019	Salernitana	2	(0)
2018–2019	→ Paganese (loan)	31	(1)
2019–2021	Paganese	55	(1)
2021–2022	Fidelis Andria	24	(2)
2022	Cavese	7	(0)
2022–2023	Casarano	15	(0)
2023–2024	Vibonese	27	(5)
2024	Angri	12	(0)
2025	Matera	5	(0)
2025–	Nuova Sondrio	12	(0)
- * Club domestic league appearances and goals as of 22 February 2026

Danilo Gaeta (born 9 March 1999) is an Italian footballer who plays as a midfielder for Serie D club Nuova Sondrio.

== Career ==
He made his Serie B debut for Salernitana on 12 May 2018 in a game against Foggia.

On 1 July 2018, he joined Serie C club Paganese on a one-year loan. On 31 July 2019, he returned to Paganese on a permanent basis, signing a 3-year contract.

On 11 August 2021, he moved to Fidelis Andria.

On 16 August 2022, Gaeta signed with Cavese in Serie D.
