= Leonardo Di Cosmo =

Italian football player

Personal information
- Date of birth: 31 October 1998 (age 28)
- Place of birth: Andria, Italy
- Height: 1.78 m (5 ft 10 in)
- Position: Midfielder

Team information
- Current team: Pianese
- Number: 37

Youth career
- –2017: Fidelis Andria
- 2016–2017: → Bisceglie (loan)

Senior career*
Years	Team	Apps	(Gls)
2017–2018	Fidelis Andria	14	(0)
2018–2023	Virtus Entella	40	(1)
2019–2020	→ Virtus Francavilla (loan)	19	(3)
2020–2021	→ Virtus Francavilla (loan)	25	(1)
2023–2025	Trento	76	(0)
2025–2026	Novara	24	(0)
2026–	Pianese	5	(0)
- * Club domestic league appearances and goals as of 26 September 2026

Leonardo Di Cosmo (born 31 October 1998) is an Italian football player who plays as a midfielder for Serie C Group B club Pianese.

== Career ==
=== Fidelis Andria ===
On 18 November 2017, Di Cosmo made his professional debut, in Serie C, for Fidelis Andria, as a substitute replacing Francesco De Giorgi in the 81st minute of a 5–1 away win over Akragas. On 30 December he played his first match as a starter for Fidelis Andria, a 2–0 home win over Siracusa, he was replaced by Felipe Curcio in the 58th minute. On 25 February 2018 he played his first entire match, a 1–0 away win over Paganese.

=== Virtus Entella ===
==== Loans to Virtus Francavilla ====
On 9 July 2019, he joined Virtus Francavilla on loan.

After appearing on the bench for Entella in the second game of the 2020–21 Serie B season, on 5 October 2020 he returned to Virtus Francavilla on another loan.

=== Trento ===
On 10 January 2023, Di Cosmo signed a 2.5-year contract with Trento.

== Career statistics ==
As of match played 9 April 2022

Appearances and goals by club, season and competition
Club	Season	League			National Cup		Other		Total	
Club	Season	Division	Apps	Goals	Apps	Goals	Apps	Goals	Apps	Goals
Fidelis Andria	2017–18	Serie C	14	0	—		—		14	0
Virtus Entella	2018–19	Serie C	9	0	0	0	—		9	0
Virtus Entella	2020–21	Serie B	0	0	—		—		0	0
Virtus Entella	2021–22	Serie C	25	1	—		—		25	1
Virtus Entella	Total		34	1	0	0	0	0	34	1
Virtus Francavilla (loan)	2019–20	Serie C	19	3	0	0	1 (Note: Appearance(s) in Promotion Playoffs)	0	20	3
Virtus Francavilla (loan)	2020–21	Serie C	25	1	—		—		25	1
Virtus Francavilla (loan)	Total		44	4	0	0	1	0	45	4
Career total			92	5	0	0	1	0	79	5
