= AC Mestre =

Italian football club

Mestre
- Full name: Associazione Calcio Mestre
- Nicknames: l'Arancioneri (The Orange & Blacks); Il Piccolo Torino (Little Torino)
- Founded: 1927; 99 years ago as, Unione Sportiva Mestrina; 1980; 46 years ago as, Associazione Calcio Mestre; 1987; 39 years ago as, Calcio Venezia-Mestre (merged); 1991; 35 years ago as, Calcio Malcontenta-Mestrina (merged); 1993; 33 years ago as, Mestre Calcio (relocated); 2003; 23 years ago as, Associazione Sportiva Mestre (refounded); 2015; 11 years ago as, Associazione Calcio Mestre (relocated)
- Ground: Stadio Francesco Baracca, Mestre, Venice, Italy
- Capacity: 2,000
- Chairman: Stefano Serena
- Manager: Gianni D'Amore
- League: Serie D
- 2025–26: Serie D/C, 6th
- Website: www.acmestre1929.it
Home colours	Away colours

Associazione Calcio Mestre is an Italian association football club located in Mestre, Venice, Veneto. It currently plays in Serie D, the fourth tier of the Italian league system. Its colours are orange and black.

== History ==
The club was founded in 1927 as Unione Sportiva Mestrina. The club made their first Serie C appearance in 1938, winning the league in 1946 and subsequently taking part to the 1946–47 Serie B season, on what it was the highest moment in the club's history.

In the following years, Mestrina played mostly around Serie C and Serie D level. In 1980 the club was renamed to Associazione Calcio Mestre, and played in the Serie C1 and Serie C2 leagues on a regular basis.

In 1987 the club was acquired by Maurizio Zamparini, who had already bought Venezia, in order to merge the two clubs together under a new denomination of Venezia-Mestre Calcio and a choice of team colours that combined Mestre's orange and black with Venezia's black and green. In 1989, following the club's change of name to Venezia 1907 (thus excluding any past reference to Mestre altogether) and the club's decision to move out of the Mestre-based Stadio Francesco Baracca in 1991, attempts were made to refound the original Mestre club, with Eccellenza club Malcontenta moving to the Venice suburb and changing its denomination to Malcontenta-Mestrina and finally back to Mestre Calcio.

In 1995, Mestre Calcio returned to Serie D, and won a second consecutive promotion the next year, thus bringing Mestre back to professionalism already in 1996. The club were relegated in 2003 and went bankrupt afterwards. The club resumed activity from Terza Categoria and reached Prima Categoria in 2010. A minor club in town, called Mestrina F.C., were playing in Eccellenza at the time; due to a number of legal loopholes, the two clubs merged in 2015 to acquire the footballing rights of Mogliano-based club Union Pro, who were playing in Serie D at the time. Through all this, Mestre managed to return to Serie D for the 2015–16 season, and won promotion to Serie C in 2017 under head coach Mauro Zironelli.

After the 2017–18 Serie C season, Mestre attempted to enroll in the next championship at the last minute. However, anticipated new financial backers walked away from the club, citing concerns over infrastructure. After the Serie C registration was rejected, Mestre had no better option but to play the 2018–19 season in Eccellenza.

Mestre were immediately promoted back to Serie D on their first Eccellenza season, winning the national playoff tournament in 2019.

== Players ==
As of 6 November 2026

Note: Flags indicate national team as defined under FIFA eligibility rules; some limited exceptions apply. Players may hold more than one non-FIFA nationality.

No.	Pos.	Nation	Player
1	GK	KOS	Leonard Kolgecaj
2	DF	ALB	Davide Avdullari
3	DF	ITA	Bruno De Pace
4	MF	ITA	Enrico Sabba
5	MF	ITA	Nunzio Brandi
6	DF	ITA	Marco Soprano
7	MF	ITA	Edoardo Dalla Nora
8	MF	ITA	Manuel Garavini
9	FW	ITA	Michele Trombetta
10	FW	ARG	Pablo Banegas
11	FW	ITA	Pierpaolo Longo
12	GK	LTU	Modestas Sinskas
20	DF	FRA	Ludovic Legal

No.	Pos.	Nation	Player
21	MF	MNE	Luka Vlahovic
23	MF	ITA	Giordano Trovade
26	MF	ITA	Mattia Bozza
28	DF	ITA	Nicolò Verzeni
30	FW	ITA	Nicola Valente
40	DF	ITA	Marco Mudadu
56	DF	ITA	Nicolò Greco
70	FW	NGR	Taiwo Olonisakin
77	MF	ITA	Francesco Tumiatti
—	MF	BRA	Ronaldo Pompeu
