= Santo D'Angelo =

Italian footballer

Personal information
- Date of birth: 5 October 1995 (age 31)
- Place of birth: Palermo, Italy
- Height: 1.84 m (6 ft 0 in)
- Position: Midfielder

Team information
- Current team: Latina
- Number: 27

Senior career*
Years	Team	Apps	(Gls)
2012–2013	Atletico Campofranco	20	(2)
2013–2014	Noto	25	(2)
2014–2017	Matera	9	(0)
2016–2017	→ Fondi (loan)	32	(0)
2017–2019	Sicula Leonzio	63	(9)
2019–2020	Livorno	1	(0)
2020	→ Potenza (loan)	11	(0)
2020–2022	Avellino	49	(11)
2022–2023	Reggiana	25	(0)
2023–2026	Avellino	31	(3)
2024	→ Crotone (loan)	7	(1)
2024–2025	→ Campobasso (loan)	33	(1)
2026–	Latina	5	(0)
- * Club domestic league appearances and goals as of 1 May 2026

Santo D'Angelo, also known as Sonny D'Angelo (born 5 October 1995) is an Italian professional footballer who plays as a midfielder for Serie C Group B club Latina.

== Career ==
D'Angelo spent the first two seasons of his senior career in the fifth and fourth tier (Eccellenza and Serie D) before joining Serie C club Matera.

He made his professional Serie C debut for Matera on 26 September 2015, in a game against Casertana.

He stayed in Serie C for 5 seasons.

On 8 July 2019, D'Angelo signed for Serie B club Livorno.

He made his Serie B debut for Livorno on 29 September 2019, as a 67th minute substitute for Andrea Luci, in a game against Salernitana.

On 10 January 2020, D'Angelo joined Serie C club Potenza on loan with an option to buy.

On 25 September 2020, he signed a two-year contract with Avellino.

On 26 January 2022, D'Angelo moved to Reggiana.

On 3 January 2023, he returned to Avellino on a two-and-a-half-year deal.

On 1 February 2024, D'Angelo was loaned to Crotone.

On 20 July 2024, he joined Campobasso on loan.
