= SS Turris Calcio =

Italian football club

Turris
- Full name: Società Sportiva; Turris Calcio
- Nicknames: Torresi, Corallini
- Founded: 1944; 2003 (refounded); 2014 (refounded)
- Ground: Stadio Amerigo Liguori, Torre del Greco, Italy
- Capacity: 5,300
- Chairman: Antonio Colantonio
- Manager: Domenico Giampà
- League: Serie D Group H
- 2024–25: Serie C Group C, 19th of 20 (relegated)
| Home colours | Away colours |

S.S. Turris Calcio, commonly known as Turris, is an Italian football club based in Torre del Greco, Campania. The club was founded in 1944 as F.C. Turris 1944 and refounded in 2004 and then 2012. The nicknames of the team are Torresi and Corallini.

Turris were promoted to Serie C in 2019–20 as champions of Serie D, following the early conclusion of the league due to the COVID-19 pandemic.

== History ==
=== From 1944 to 2012 ===
==== F.C. Turris 1944 ====
Former FC Turris logo

F.C. Turris 1944 was founded in 1944 and refounded in 2004. In the past, the club played many seasons in Serie C.

==== Serie D 2010–11 ====
In the 2010–11 season, Turris were the losing finalists of Coppa Italia Serie D. Since the winner, Perugia, were promoted to Lega Pro Seconda Divisione as the division winner, Turris qualified for the semi-finals of the national promotion playoffs. Turris defeated SandonàJesolo in the semifinals but lost 3–1 on penalties, after a scoreless game, to Rimini in the final and remained in Serie D.

=== The transfer to Nola, Neapolis' relocation, and refoundation ===
In the summer of 2012, the club's membership of Serie D was transferred to Real Hyria Nola in the city of Nola. Until the end of the 2013–14 season, the main football club of the city was F.C. Torre Neapolis 1944, as President Mario Moxedano relocated the former F.C. Neapolis Mugnano to the city from Mugnano di Napoli. In the summer of 2014, Moxedano moved Mugnano di Napoli again, refounding F.C. Neapolis. Turris was refounded as a relocation of FC Miano (Eccellenza league) in the same year, and then renamed Associazione Polisportiva Turris Calcio A.S.D.. They won the Eccellenza the year after and returned to Serie D.

=== From 2017 and return to professional football ===
In 2017, Turris was acquired by Antonio Colantonio, who promised to supporters that he would take the team back to professional football within three years.

In 2018, the club was renamed ASD Turris Calcio.

In 2019–20, Turris won promotion to Serie C, returning to professional football for the first time since Serie C2 2000-2001 and to the third level of Italian football for the first time since the Serie C1 1997-1998 season.

For the 2021–22 season, the club has been renamed SS Turris Calcio.

== Colors and badge ==
The club's colours are red with white lightning bolts on the front.

== Current squad ==
As of 22 July 2025

Note: Flags indicate national team as defined under FIFA eligibility rules; some limited exceptions apply. Players may hold more than one non-FIFA nationality.

| No. | Pos. | Nation | Player |
|---|---|---|---|
| 1 | GK | ITA | Simone Luliano |
| 4 | MF | ITA | Fabio Castellano |
| 6 | DF | FRA | Hamed Dramé |
| 7 | FW | SWE | Emmanuel Tannor |
| 8 | MF | ITA | Biagio Morrone |
| 10 | FW | ITA | Luca Giannone |
| 13 | DF | ITA | Luca Ricci |
| 15 | DF | SEN | Maissa Ndiaye (on loan from Cremonese) |

| No. | Pos. | Nation | Player |
|---|---|---|---|
| 22 | GK | ITA | Mattia Fallani |
| 27 | MF | ITA | Mattia Porro |
| 29 | FW | ITA | Marcello Trotta |
| 30 | DF | ITA | Francesco Desiato |
| 35 | DF | ITA | Davide Lonati |
| 36 | MF | ITA | Bruno Sabatino |
| 66 | DF | FRA | Jordan Boli |
| 99 | MF | ITA | Samuel Pugliese |

== Notable former managers ==
- (Italy) Adriano Lombardi
