= 2018–19 Brescia Calcio season =

Brescia Calcio
2018–19 season
- Chairman: Massimo Cellino
- Head coach: Eugenio Corini
- Stadium: Stadio Mario Rigamonti
- Serie B: 1st
- Coppa Italia: Third round
- Top goalscorer: League: Alfredo Donnarumma (25); All: Alfredo Donnarumma (27)
- Average home league attendance: 8,197
Home colours	Away colours	Third colours

The 2018–19 season is Brescia Calcio's 109th in existence and eighth consecutive season in Serie B, the second tier of Italian football.

David Suazo was appointed manager of the club in June 2018 . He was let go on September 18 after three league matches. He was replaced by Eugenio Corini.

On May 1, 2019, Brescia were promoted to Serie A for the 2019–20 season.

== Players ==
=== Squad information ===
Players and squad numbers last updated on 2 February 2019. Appearances include league matches only.
Note: Flags indicate national team as has been defined under FIFA eligibility rules. Players may hold more than one non-FIFA nationality.

No.	Name	Nat	Position(s)	Date of birth (age)	Signed in	Contract ends	Signed from	Transfer Fee	Apps.	Goals
Goalkeepers
1	Enrico Alfonso	(Italy)	GK	4 May 1988 (age 38)	2018	2021	(Italy) Cittadella	N/A	26	0
12	Paolo Bastianello	(Italy)	GK	4 February 1998 (age 28)	2018		(Italy) Avellino	N/A	0	0
12	Lorenzo Andrenacci	(Italy)	GK	2 January 1995 (age 31)	2014	2019	(Italy) Milan	N/A	9	0
Defenders
2	Stefano Sabelli	(Italy)	RB	13 January 1993 (age 33)	2018	2021	(Italy) Bari	N/A	25	0
3	Aleš Matějů	(Czech Republic)	RB	3 June 1996 (age 30)	2018	2019	(England) Brighton	Loan	19	0
5	Daniele Gastaldello	(Italy)	CB	25 June 1983 (age 43)	2017	2019	(Italy) Bologna	N/A	53	3
15	Andrea Cistana	(Italy)	CB	1 August 1997 (age 29)	2016	2021	(Italy) Youth Sector	N/A	27	0
16	Felipe Curcio	(Brazil)	LB	6 August 1993 (age 33)	2018	2020	(Italy) Fidelis Andria	N/A	32	0
18	Simone Romagnoli	(Italy)	CB	9 February 1990 (age 36)	2018	2019	(Italy) Empoli	Loan	31	2
19	Edoardo Lancini	(Italy)	CB	10 April 1994 (age 32)	2013		(Italy) Youth Sector	N/A	64	1
26	Bruno Martella	(Italy)	LB	14 August 1992 (age 34)	2019	2019	(Italy) Crotone	Loan	23	2
29	Alessandro Semprini	(Italy)	RB	24 February 1998 (age 28)	2017	2021	(Italy) Youth Sector	N/A	6	0
31	Luigi Carillo	(Italy)	CB	8 August 1996 (age 30)	2018	2019	(Italy) Genoa	Loan	0	0
Midfielders
4	Sandro Tonali	(Italy)	DM	8 May 2000 (age 26)	2017	2021	(Italy) Youth sector	N/A	51	5
6	Emanuele Ndoj	(Albania)	CM	20 November 1996 (age 29)	2016	2022	(Italy) Roma	N/A	66	4
7	Nikolas Špalek	(Slovakia)	AM	12 February 1997 (age 29)	2018	2021	(Slovakia) Žilina	N/A	43	4
8	Alessandro Martinelli	(Switzerland)	CM	30 May 1993 (age 33)	2017		(Italy) Sampdoria	N/A	114	2
14	Jacopo Dall'Oglio	(Italy)	DM	2 April 1992 (age 34)	2015	2021	(Italy) Reggina	N/A	64	3
22	Leonardo Morosini	(Italy)	AM	13 October 1995 (age 30)	2018	2022	(Italy) Genoa	N/A	102	18
Forwards
9	Alfredo Donnarumma	(Italy)	ST	30 November 1990 (age 35)	2018	2022	(Italy) Empoli	N/A	34	27
11	Ernesto Torregrossa	(Italy)	ST	28 June 1992 (age 34)	2016	2021	(Italy) Verona	N/A	31	13

== Pre-season and friendlies ==
18 July 2018 Friendly	Brescia (Italy)	10-1	(Italy) Rappresentativa Locale	Darfo Boario Terme
19:00 CEST		Report	Stefani	Stadium: Comunale di Darfo Boario Terme

22 July 2018 Friendly	Brescia (Italy)	6–2	(Italy) Dilettanti Camnuni	Darfo Boario Terme
19:00 CEST				Stadium: Comunale di Darfo Boario Terme

25 July 2018 Friendly	Brescia (Italy)	2–1	(Italy) Rezzato	Darfo Boario Terme
18:30 CEST				Stadium: Comunale di Darfo Boario Terme

9 August 2018 Friendly	Brescia (Italy)	4–1	(Italy) Ciliverghe	Brescia
17:00 CEST				Stadium: Centro Sportivo San Filippo

== Competitions ==
=== Serie B ===
==== League table ====
Pos	Team	Pld	W	D	L	GF	GA	GD	Pts	Promotion, qualification or relegation
1	Brescia (C, P)	36	18	13	5	69	42	+27	67	Promotion to Serie A
2	Lecce (P)	36	19	9	8	66	45	+21	66	Promotion to Serie A
3	Benevento	36	17	9	10	61	45	+16	60	Qualification to promotion play-offs semi-finals
4	Pescara	36	14	13	9	50	46	+4	55	Qualification to promotion play-offs semi-finals
5	Hellas Verona (O, P)	36	13	13	10	49	46	+3	52	Qualification to promotion play-offs preliminary round

Source: Lega Serie B
Rules for classification: 1) Points; 2) Head-to-head points; 3) Head-to-head goal difference; 4) Goal difference; 5) Goals scored; 6) Draw.
(C) Champions; (O) Play-off winners; (P) Promoted

==== Results summary ====
Overall								Home						Away					
Pld	W	D	L	GF	GA	GD	Pts	W	D	L	GF	GA	GD	W	D	L	GF	GA	GD
36	18	13	5	66	42	+24	67	13	3	2	36	19	+17	5	10	3	30	23	+7

Last updated: 11 May 2019.
Source: Competitive matches

==== Results by round ====
Round	1	2	3	4	5	6	7	8	9	10	11	12	13	14	15	16	17	18	19	20	21	22	23	24	25	26	27	28	29	30	31	32	33	34	35	36	37	38
Ground	H	A	H	A	H	A	H	A	H	-	A	H	A	H	A	H	A	H	A	A	H	A	H	A	H	A	H	A	-	H	A	H	A	H	A	H	A	H
Result	D	L	D	D	W	D	W	D	W	-	D	W	L	W	W	W	D	W	D	W	D	W	W	D	W	D	L	W	-	W	D	W	W	W	L	W	D	L
Position	6	15	15	14	8	10	9	10	6	8	8	6	8	5	4	2	3	2	2	2	2	1	1	1	1	1	1	1	1	1	1	1	1	1	1	1	1	1

Updated to match(es) played on 11 May 2019. Source: Competitive matches
A = Away; H = Home; W = Win; D = Draw; L = Loss

==== Matches ====
24 August 2018 1	Brescia	1–1	Perugia	Brescia
21:00 CEST (UTC+02:00)	Bisoli 43'	Report	Vido 90+3'	Stadium: Stadio Mario Rigamonti; Referee: Ivano Pezzuto

1 September 2018 2	Spezia	3–2	Brescia	La Spezia
18:00 CEST (UTC+02:00)	Pierini 6', 17'; Gyasi 74'	Report	Donnarumma 1'; Morosini 20'	Stadium: Stadio Alberto Picco; Referee: Luca Massimi

15 September 2018 3	Brescia	1–1	Pescara	Brescia
15:00 CEST (UTC+02:00)	Morosini 82'	Report	Monachello 89'	Stadium: Stadio Mario Rigamonti; Referee: Marco Serra

22 September 2018 4	Carpi	1–1	Brescia	Carpi
15:00 CEST (UTC+02:00)	Arrighini 28'	Report	Frascatore 13' (o.g.)	Stadium: Stadio Sandro Cabassi; Referee: Fabio Piscopo

25 September 2018 5	Brescia	2–1	Palermo	Brescia
21:00 CEST (UTC+02:00)	Donnarumma 27', 29'	Report	Moreo 86'	Stadium: Stadio Mario Rigamonti; Referee: Marco Piccinini

29 September 2018 6	Crotone	2–2	Brescia	Crotone
21:00 CEST (UTC+02:00)	Budimir 56', 90+6'	Report	Donnarumma 11' (pen.); Dall'Oglio 71'	Stadium: Stadio Ezio Scida

7 October 2018 7	Brescia	4–1	Padova	Brescia
15:00 CEST (UTC+02:00)	Tremolada 61'; Donnarumma 72', 86' (pen.), 89'	Report	Cappelletti 16'	Stadium: Stadio Mario Rigamonti; Referee: Antonio Rapuano

20 October 2018 8	Cittadella	2–2	Brescia	Cittadella
15:00 CEST (UTC+02:00)	Finotto 13'; Cistana 35' (o.g.)	Report	Morosini 50', 69'	Stadium: Stadio Pier Cesare Tombolato; Referee: Lorenzo Illuzzi

27 October 2018 9	Brescia	1–0	Cosenza	Brescia
15:00 CEST (UTC+02:00)	Torregrossa 66'	Report		Stadium: Stadio Mario Rigamonti; Referee: Alessandro Prontera

10	bye

3 November 2018 11	Foggia	2–2	Brescia	Foggia
15:00 CEST (UTC+02:00)	Mazzeo 6'; Gerbo 52'	Report	Torregrossa 14'; Tremolada 83'	Stadium: Stadio Pino Zaccheria; Referee: Valerio Marini

11 November 2018 12	Brescia	4–2	Hellas Verona	Brescia
15:00 CEST (UTC+02:00)	Donnarumma 38', 56'; Tonali 43'; Torregrossa 69'	Report	Caracciolo 51'; Pazzini 80'	Stadium: Stadio Mario Rigamonti; Referee: Davide Ghersini

24 November 2018 13	Venezia	2–1	Brescia	Venice
15:00 CEST (UTC+02:00)	Di Mariano 14', 37'	Report	Donnarumma 90+2'	Stadium: Stadio Pier Luigi Penzo; Referee: Luigi Pillitteri

2 December 2018 14	Brescia	2–0	Livorno	Brescia
15:00 CEST (UTC+02:00)	Torregrossa 35', 58'	Report		Stadium: Stadio Mario Rigamonti; Referee: Daniele Minelli

10 December 2018 15	Salernitana	1–3	Brescia	Salerno
21:00 CEST (UTC+02:00)	Di Tacchio 90'	Report	Donnarumma 5', 9', 32'	Stadium: Stadio Arechi; Referee: Fabio Piscopo

16 December 2018 16	Brescia	2–1	Lecce	Brescia
21:00 CEST (UTC+02:00)	Donnarumma 49'; Gastaldello 90+2'	Report	La Mantia 25'	Stadium: Stadio Mario Rigamonti; Referee: Francesco Fourneau

21 December 2018 17	Ascoli	1–1	Brescia	Ascoli Piceno
21:00 CEST (UTC+02:00)	Rosseti 75'	Report	Bisoli 90+4'	Stadium: Stadio Cino e Lillo Del Duca; Referee: Luigi Nasca

26 December 2018 18	Brescia	3–2	Cremonese	Brescia
15:00 CEST (UTC+02:00)	Špalek 22'; Bisoli 42'; Ndoj 90'	Report	Piccolo 53', 78' (pen.)	Stadium: Stadio Mario Rigamonti; Referee: Lorenzo Maggioni

30 December 2018 19	Benevento	1–1	Brescia	Benevento
16:00 CEST (UTC+02:00)	Cistana 79' (o.g.)	Report	Torregrossa 73'	Stadium: Stadio Ciro Vigorito; Referee: Antonio Rapuano

19 January 2019 20	Perugia	0–2	Brescia	Perugia
15:00 CEST (UTC+02:00)		Report	Torregrossa 5'; Donnarumma 76'	Stadium: Stadio Renato Curi; Referee: Antonio Giua

27 January 2019 21	Brescia	4–4	Spezia	Brescia
18:00 CEST (UTC+02:00)	Tonali 24'; Donnarumma 45+2', 55', 77' (pen.)	Report	Mora 1'; Bidaoui 40', 48'; Okereke 64' (pen.)	Stadium: Stadio Mario Rigamonti; Referee: Aleandro Di Paolo

3 February 2019 22	Pescara	1–5	Brescia	Pescara
21:00 CEST (UTC+02:00)	Monachello 58'	Report	Donnarumma 21' (pen.); Romagnoli 32'; Bisoli 38'; Torregrossa 56' (pen.), 90+4'	Stadium: Stadio Giovanni Cornacchia; Referee: Gianluca Aureliano

9 February 2019 23	Brescia	3–1	Carpi	Brescia
18:00 CEST (UTC+02:00)	Donnarumma 18' (pen.), 90+1'; Ndoj 37'	Report	Rolando 22'	Stadium: Stadio Mario Rigamonti; Referee: Lorenzo Illuzzi

24	Palermo	1–1	Brescia	Palermo
	Nestorovski 79'	Report	Tremolada 90+2'	Stadium: Stadio Renzo Barbera; Referee: Juan Luca Sacchi

25	Brescia	2–0	Crotone	Brescia
	Molina 80' (o.g.); Donnarumma 90+5'	Report		Stadium: Stadio Mario Rigamonti; Referee: Riccardo Ros

26 February 2019 26	Padova	1–1	Brescia	Padova
	Mazzocca 57'	Report	Ndoj 77'	Stadium: Stadio Euganeo; Referee: Niccolo' Baroni

2 March 2019 27	Brescia	0–1	Cittadella	Brescia
		Report	Finotto 11'	Stadium: Stadio Mario Rigamonti; Referee: Davide Ghersini

9 March 2019 28	Cosenza	2–3	Brescia	Cosenza
	Bruccini 18'; Embaló 27'	Report	Špalek 53'; Donnarumma 75' (pen.); Bisoli 90+4'	Stadium: Stadio San Vito; Referee: Federico Dionisi

29	bye

30 March 2019 30	Brescia	2–1	Foggia	Brescia
	Martella 32'; Donnarumma 65'	Report	Galano 5'	Stadium: Stadio Mario Rigamonti; Referee: Daniele Minelli

2 April 2019 31	Hellas Verona	2–2	Brescia	Verona
	Faraoni 14', 60'	Report	Torregrossa 19'; Martella 43'	Stadium: Stadio Marcantonio Bentegodi; Referee: Francesco Fourneau

5 April 2019 32	Brescia	2–0	Venezia	Brescia
	Torregrossa 44'; Tonali 80'	Report		Stadium: Stadio Mario Rigamonti; Referee: Luca Massimi

15 April 2019 33	Livorno	0–1	Brescia	Livorno
21:00 CEST (UTC+02:00)		Report	Romagnoli 89'	Stadium: Stadio Armando Picchi; Referee: Livio Marinelli

22 April 2019 34	Brescia	3–0	Salernitana	Brescia
18:00 CEST (UTC+02:00)	Tremolada 3'; Torregrossa 37'; Donnarumma 59' (pen.)	Report		Stadium: Stadio Mario Rigamonti; Referee: Ivano Pezzuto

28 April 2019 35	Lecce	1–0	Brescia	Lecce
21:00 CEST (UTC+02:00)	Tabanelli 80'	Report		Stadium: Stadio Via del Mare; Referee: Marco Piccinini

1 May 2019 36	Brescia	1–0	Ascoli	Brescia
18:00 CEST (UTC+02:00)	Dessena 36'	Report		Stadium: Stadio Mario Rigamonti; Referee: Niccolo' Baroni

4 May 2019 37	Cremonese	0–0	Brescia	Cremona
15:00 CEST (UTC+02:00)		Report		Stadium: Stadio Giovanni Zini; Referee: Luigi Nasca

11 May 2019 38	Brescia	2–3	Benevento	Brescia
15:00 CEST (UTC+02:00)	Di Chiara 4' (o.g.); Bisoli 30'	Report	Armenteros 9', 52'; Insigne 36'	Stadium: Stadio Mario Rigamonti; Referee: Luigi Pillitteri

=== Coppa Italia ===
5 August 2018 Second round	Brescia	1–1 (a.e.t.) (4–1 p)	Pro Vercelli	Brescia
	Donnarumma 47'		90+4' Berra	Stadium: Stadio Mario Rigamonti

12 August 2018 Third round	Brescia	2–2 (a.e.t.) (4–5 p)	Novara Calcio	Brescia
	Donnarumma 10'; Torregrossa 49' (pen.)	Report	71' (pen.) Schiavi; 81' Sciaudone	Stadium: Stadio Mario Rigamonti

== Statistics ==
=== Appearances and goals ===
No.	Pos	Nat	Player	Total		Serie B		Coppa Italia	
No.	Pos	Nat	Player	Apps	Goals	Apps	Goals	Apps	Goals
Goalkeepers
1	GK	(Italy) ITA	Enrico Alfonso	32	0	30	0	2	0
22	GK	(Italy) ITA	Lorenzo Andrenacci	7	0	7	0	0	0
Defenders
2	DF	(Italy) ITA	Stefano Sabelli	30	0	29	0	1	0
3	DF	(Czech Republic) CZE	Aleš Matějů	23	0	22	0	1	0
5	DF	(Italy) ITA	Daniele Gastaldello	19	1	19	1	0	0
15	DF	(Italy) ITA	Andrea Cistana	32	0	30	0	2	0
16	DF	(Brazil) BRA	Felipe Curcio	17	0	15	0	2	0
18	DF	(Italy) ITA	Simone Romagnoli	35	2	35	2	0	0
19	DF	(Italy) ITA	Edoardo Lancini	5	0	3	0	2	0
26	DF	(Italy) ITA	Bruno Martella	10	2	10	2	0	0
29	DF	(Italy) ITA	Alessandro Semprini	6	0	6	0	0	0
	DF	(Italy) ITA	Biagio Meccariello	1	0	0	0	1	0
	DF	(Italy) ITA	Ivan Rondanini	1	0	0	0	1	0
Midfielders
4	MF	(Italy) ITA	Sandro Tonali	34	3	34	3	0	0
6	MF	(Albania) ALB	Emanuele Ndoj	30	3	28	3	2	0
7	MF	(Slovakia) SVK	Nikolas Špalek	29	2	28	2	1	0
8	MF	(Switzerland) SUI	Alessandro Martinelli	15	0	14	0	1	0
14	MF	(Italy) ITA	Jacopo Dall'Oglio	18	1	17	1	1	0
23	MF	(Italy) ITA	Leonardo Morosini	27	4	25	4	2	0
24	MF	(Italy) ITA	Mattia Viviani	8	0	6	0	2	0
25	MF	(Italy) ITA	Dimitri Bisoli	37	6	35	6	2	0
27	MF	(Italy) ITA	Daniele Dessena	11	1	11	1	0	0
32	MF	(Italy) ITA	Luca Tremolada	20	4	18	4	2	0
Forwards
9	FW	(Italy) ITA	Alfredo Donnarumma	34	27	32	25	2	2
11	FW	(Italy) ITA	Ernesto Torregrossa	31	13	29	12	2	1
20	FW	(Spain) ESP	Alejandro Rodríguez	6	0	6	0	0	0
21	FW	(Italy) ITA	Matteo Cortesi	3	0	3	0	0	0
	FW	(Argentina) ARG	Franco Ferrari	5	0	4	0	1	0

Last updated: 11 May 2019
Source: Competitions

=== Goalscorers ===
Rank	No.	Pos	Nat	Name	Serie B	Coppa Italia	Total
1	9	FW	(Italy)	Alfredo Donnarumma	25	2	27
2	11	FW	(Italy)	Ernesto Torregrossa	12	1	13
3	25	MF	(Italy)	Dimitri Bisoli	6	0	6
4	23	MF	(Italy)	Leonardo Morosini	4	0	4
5	6	MF	(Albania)	Emanuele Ndoj	3	0	3
5	4	MF	(Italy)	Sandro Tonali	3	0	3
5	32	MF	(Italy)	Luca Tremolada	4	0	4
8	7	MF	(Slovakia)	Nikolas Špalek	2	0	2
8	18	DF	(Italy)	Simone Romagnoli	2	0	2
8	26	DF	(Italy)	Bruno Martella	2	0	2
11	5	DF	(Italy)	Daniele Gastaldello	1	0	1
11	14	MF	(Italy)	Jacopo Dall'Oglio	1	0	1
11	27	MF	(Italy)	Daniele Dessena	1	0	1

=== Clean sheets ===
Rank	No.	Pos	Nat	Name	Serie B	Coppa Italia	Total
1	1	GK	(Italy)	Enrico Alfonso	5	0	5
1	22	GK	(Italy)	Lorenzo Andrenacci	2	0	2

=== Disciplinary record ===
No.	Pos	Nat	Name	Serie B			Coppa Italia			Total		
No.	Pos	Nat	Name	Booked	(yellow card) (yellow-red card)	Sent off (straight red)	Booked	(yellow card) (yellow-red card)	Sent off (straight red)	Booked	(yellow card) (yellow-red card)	Sent off (straight red)
22	GK	(Italy)	Lorenzo Andrenacci	1	0	0	0	0	0	1	0	0
2	DF	(Italy)	Stefano Sabelli	9	0	0	0	0	0	9	0	0
3	DF	(Czech Republic)	Aleš Matějů	3	0	0	0	0	0	3	0	0
5	DF	(Italy)	Daniele Gastaldello	1	0	1	0	0	0	1	0	1
15	DF	(Italy)	Andrea Cistana	6	0	0	0	0	0	6	0	0
16	DF	(Brazil)	Felipe Curcio	0	1	0	0	0	0	0	1	0
18	DF	(Italy)	Simone Romagnoli	8	0	0	0	0	0	8	0	0
19	DF	(Italy)	Edoardo Lancini	1	0	0	1	0	0	2	0	0
29	DF	(Italy)	Alessandro Semprini	3	0	0	0	0	0	3	0	0
4	MF	(Italy)	Sandro Tonali	11	0	0	0	0	0	11	0	0
6	MF	(Albania)	Emanuele Ndoj	11	0	0	0	0	0	11	0	0
7	MF	(Slovakia)	Nikolas Špalek	3	0	0	0	0	0	3	0	0
8	MF	(Italy)	Alessandro Martinelli	1	0	0	0	0	0	1	0	0
14	MF	(Italy)	Jacopo Dall'Oglio	3	0	0	0	0	0	3	0	0
24	MF	(Italy)	Mattia Viviani	1	0	0	0	0	0	1	0	0
25	MF	(Italy)	Dimitri Bisoli	4	0	0	1	0	0	5	0	0
27	MF	(Italy)	Daniele Dessena	2	0	0	0	0	0	2	0	0
32	MF	(Italy)	Luca Tremolada	1	0	0	0	0	0	1	0	0
11	FW	(Italy)	Ernesto Torregrossa	6	0	0	0	0	0	6	0	0
