= 2021–22 Palermo FC season =

Palermo
2021–22 season
- President: Dario Mirri
- Manager: Giacomo Filippi (until 24 December 2021); Silvio Baldini (from 24 December 2021)
- Stadium: Renzo Barbera
- Serie C: 3rd
- Play-offs: Winners – Promoted to Serie B
- Coppa Italia Serie C: Round of 16
- Top goalscorer: League: Matteo Brunori (25); All: Matteo Brunori (29)
- Highest home attendance: 35,037 (v Feralpisalò, 29 May)
- Lowest home attendance: 1,008 (v Monopoli, 15 September)
- Average home league attendance: 5,758
- Biggest win: 5–0 (v Turris, 19 February)
- Biggest defeat: 0–3 (v Turris, 17 October); 1–4 (v Foggia, 15 February)
Home colours	Away colours	Third colours

The 2021–22 season was Palermo Football Club's 14th season in the third tier of Italian football and the third season – second in a row – in the unified Serie C. In addition to the domestic league, Palermo participated in this season's edition of the Coppa Italia Serie C after 20 years.

Match legend:

- (H) – Home
- (A) – Away
- (N) – Neutral
- (Y) – Yellow cards
- (R) – Red cards

Win	Draw	Loss	Canceled

== Players ==
=== First team squad ===
Sources: Palermo F.C., Soccerway

Note: Flags indicate national team as defined under FIFA eligibility rules; some limited exceptions apply. Players may hold more than one non-FIFA nationality.

No.	Pos.	Nation	Player
1	GK	ITA	Alberto Pelagotti
3	DF	FRA	Maxime Giron
4	DF	ITA	Andrea Accardi
5	DF	GAM	Bubacarr Marong
6	DF	ITA	Roberto Crivello
7	FW	ITA	Roberto Floriano
9	FW	ITA	Matteo Brunori
10	FW	ITA	Andrea Silipo
11	MF	ITA	Jacopo Dall'Oglio
12	GK	ITA	Samuele Massolo
15	DF	ITA	Ivan Marconi
16	DF	ITA	Michele Somma
17	MF	ITA	Gregorio Luperini

No.	Pos.	Nation	Player
19	MF	GHA	Moses Odjer
20	MF	ITA	Francesco De Rose (Captain)
21	MF	ITA	Samuele Damiani
23	FW	ITA	Giuseppe Fella
25	DF	ITA	Alessio Buttaro
27	FW	ITA	Edoardo Soleri
29	DF	ITA	Alberto Almici
30	MF	ITA	Nicola Valente
33	DF	ITA	Marco Perrotta
54	DF	ITA	Manuel Peretti
75	FW	ITA	Mattia Felici
77	DF	ALB	Masimiliano Doda
79	DF	ITA	Edoardo Lancini

=== Youth sector ===
Players joined First squad during the season.

Note: Flags indicate national team as defined under FIFA eligibility rules; some limited exceptions apply. Players may hold more than one non-FIFA nationality.

No.	Pos.	Nation	Player
13	GK	ITA	Giovanni Grotta
16	DF	ITA	Carlo Mannina
22	GK	ITA	Giuseppe Misseri

No.	Pos.	Nation	Player
31	FW	ITA	Giacomo Corona
36	DF	ITA	Enrico Mauthe
65	MF	CIV	Aziz Toure

== Transfers ==
=== In ===
Date	Pos.	Name	From	Type	Fee	Ref.
Summer 2021
1 July 2021	DF	(France) Maxime Giron	Unattached (Note: Previous club: Bisceglie.)	Free transfer		
17 July 2021	GK	(Italy) Samuele Massolo	Unattached (Note: Previous club: Fermana.)	Free transfer		
17 July 2021	DF	(Italy) Alessio Buttaro	(Italy) Roma	Permanent	Undisclosed	
17 July 2021	FW	(Italy) Edoardo Soleri	(Italy) Padova	Loan with an option to buy	Free	
23 July 2021	FW	(Italy) Giuseppe Fella	(Italy) Salernitana	Loan with an option to buy	Free	
9 August 2021	FW	(Italy) Matteo Brunori	(Italy) Juventus	Loan	Free	
13 August 2021	MF	(Italy) Jacopo Dall'Oglio	Unattached (Note: Previous club: Catania.)	Free transfer		
31 August 2021	DF	(Italy) Marco Perrotta	(Italy) Bari	Loan	Free	
Winter 2022
5 January 2022	FW	(Italy) Mattia Felici	(Italy) Lecce	Loan with an option to buy and counter-option	Free	
21 January 2022	MF	(Italy) Samuele Damiani	(Italy) Empoli	Loan with an option to buy	Free	
Other acquisitions
30 July 2021	DF	(Italy) Christian Cangemi	(Italy) FC Messina	End of loan	Free	
28 January 2022	MF	(Ivory Coast) Aziz Toure	(Italy) Napoli	End of loan	Free	

=== Out ===
Date	Pos.	Name	To	Type	Fee	Ref.
Summer 2021
18 June 2021	FW	(Argentina) Mario Santana	Unattached	Retirement		
30 June 2021	GK	(Italy) Mattia Fallani	(Italy) SPAL	End of loan	Free	
30 June 2021	DF	(Italy) Niccolò Corrado	(Italy) Inter Milan	End of loan	Free	
30 June 2021	MF	(Italy) Andrea Palazzi	(Italy) Monza	End of loan	Free	
30 June 2021	FW	(Italy) Nicola Rauti	(Italy) Torino	End of loan	Free	
30 June 2021	MF	(France) Malaury Martin	Unattached (Note: Joined Casale after release.)	End of contract		
21 July 2021	FW	(Italy) Lorenzo Lucca	(Italy) Pisa	Permanent	€2.3M	
28 July 2021	FW	(Italy) Andrea Saraniti	Unattached (Note: Joined Taranto after release.)	Released		
12 August 2021	FW	(Senegal) Mamadou Kanouté	(Italy) Avellino	Permanent	Undisclosed	
31 August 2021	MF	(Italy) Jérémie Broh	(Italy) Südtirol	Loan with an option to buy	Free	
Winter 2022
25 January 2022	DF	(Italy) Alberto Almici	(Italy) SPAL	Permanent	Undisclosed	
31 January 2022	DF	(Italy) Manuel Peretti	(Italy) Grosseto	Loan	Free	
Other disposals
30 June 2021	GK	(Italy) Marco Matranga	Unattached	End of contract		
30 June 2021	DF	(Italy) Christian Cangemi	Unattached (Note: Joined Castelnuovo Vomano after release.)	End of contract		
30 June 2021	MF	(Italy) Salvatore Florio	Unattached (Note: Joined Casarano after release.)	End of contract		
10 August 2021	GK	(Italy) Giorgio Faraone	Unattached (Note: Joined Città di Sant'Agata after release.)	Released		
31 August 2021	MF	(Ivory Coast) Aziz Toure	(Italy) Napoli	Loan	Free	
17 December 2021	DF	(Italy) Carlo Mannina	Unattached (Note: Joined Poggibonsi after release.)	Released		

== Pre-season and friendlies ==
During pre-season Palermo played four friendlies: against Potenza and Monopoli, Serie C Group C clubs, against Salernitana, Serie A club, and against Enna, Eccellenza club. One week before the first official match, Palermo's players composed two teams, Rosa (Pink) and Nero (Black), which faced each other at Stadio Renzo Barbera. It was the first match played in Palermo with attendance since 1 March 2020. Match was played in two halves of 40 minutes each. On January Palermo played a friendly against the sicilian Eccellenza club Oratorio S. Ciro e Giorgio from Marineo, profiting by the long Christmas break due to the postponement of matchdays 21 and 22. On April Palermo played the last friendly of the season against Palermo U-19, in order to celebrate the 2nd place reached by Youth sector in the promotion play-offs for Campionato Primavera 2. This match replaces the canceled Serie C game against Catania due to the exclusion of the other sicilian club from league.

Date	Opponents	Result	Scorers	Att.
25 July 2021	Potenza	3–0 (A)	De Rose 30', Luperini (2) 49', 67'	600
29 July 2021	Monopoli	1–0 (N)	Valente 9'	
1 August 2021	Salernitana	1–2 (N)	Silipo 75' (pen.)	
8 August 2021	Enna	1–1 (A)	Lancini 48'	
14 August 2021	Rosa v Nero	2–0 (H)	Odjer 15', Brunori 35'	500
20 January 2022	Oratorio S. Ciro e Giorgio	6–0 (A)	Floriano 11', Fella 21', Silipo 45', Luperini 62', Di Maria 82' (o.g.), Valente 84'	
16 April 2022	Palermo U-19	8–1 (H)	Brunori (2) 13' (pen.), 45+5', Crivello 19', Silipo 26', Floriano 34', Soleri (2) 58', 63', Damiani 72'	1,000

== Competitions ==
=== Overview ===
League statistics include the away loss against Catania on 12 December 2021.

Competition	First match	Last match	Starting round	Final position	Record							
Competition	First match	Last match	Starting round	Final position	Pld	W	D	L	GF	GA	GD	Win %
Serie C Group C	29 August 2021	24 April 2022	Matchday 1	3rd	37	18	12	7	64	35	+29	48.65
Promotion play-offs	8 May 2022	12 June 2022	Third round	Winners	8	6	2	0	13	5	+8	75.00
Coppa Italia Serie C	21 August 2021	3 November 2021	First Round	Round of 16	3	2	0	1	6	3	+3	66.67
Total					48	26	14	8	83	43	+40	54.17

Source: Palermo matches 2021/22

=== Serie C Group C ===
==== League table ====
Pos	Team	Pld	W	D	L	GF	GA	GD	Pts	Qualification
1	Bari (C, P)	36	22	9	5	52	26	+26	75	Promotion to Serie B. Qualification for the Supercoppa di Serie C
2	Catanzaro	36	19	10	7	57	26	+31	67	Qualification for the promotion play-offs
3	Palermo (O, P)	36	18	12	6	64	33	+31	66	Qualification for the promotion play-offs
4	Avellino	36	17	13	6	45	26	+19	64	Qualification for the promotion play-offs
5	Monopoli	36	17	8	11	38	31	+7	59	Qualification for the promotion play-offs

Source: Lega Pro, Soccerway (in English)
Rules for classification: 1) Points; 2) Head-to-head points; 3) Head-to-head goal difference; 4) Goal difference; 5) Goals scored; 6) Lower goals against; 7) Wins; 8) Lower losses; 9) Away wins; 10) Lower home losses.
(C) Champions; (O) Play-off winners; (P) Promoted

==== Matches ====
Day	Date	Opponents	Result	Scorers	Y–R	Att.	League position
1	29 August 2021	Latina	2–0 (H)	Floriano 33' (pen.), Soleri 90+4' (pen.)	1–0	6,091	3rd
2	4 September 2021	ACR Messina	1–1 (A)	Soleri 65'	4–0	304	4th
3	11 September 2021	Taranto	1–3 (A)	Almici 62'	2–1	4,300	9th
4	19 September 2021	Catanzaro	0–0 (H)		4–0	2,500	10th
5	26 September 2021	Monterosi	1–1 (A)	Brunori 22'	2–0	323	12th
6	29 September 2021	Campobasso	3–1 (H)	Silipo 3', Valente 5', Brunori 80'	3–1	2,500	9th
7	4 October 2021	Juve Stabia	0–0 (A)		1–1	1,500	10th
8	10 October 2021	Foggia	3–0 (H)	Floriano 4', Brunori 20', Soleri 86' (pen.)	5–0	4,762	3rd
9	17 October 2021	Turris	0–3 (A)		4–0	1,027	7th
10	20 October 2021	Virtus Francavilla	1–0 (H)	Brunori 58'	2–1	5,192	6th
11	24 October 2021	Vibonese	3–1 (A)	Fella (2) 50', 60', Soleri 85'	3–0	350	3rd
12	31 October 2021	Avellino	1–1 (H)	Lancini 14'	3–1	7,689	4th
13	7 November 2021	Fidelis Andria	2–0 (A)	Brunori 27', Almici 63'	4–0	1,516	3rd
14	14 November 2021	Potenza	2–0 (H)	Fella 51', Silipo 90+4	2–0	7,401	2nd
15	20 November 2021	Paganese	3–0 (H)	Fella 38', Soleri 80', Brunori 83'	1–0	6,673	2nd
16	28 November 2021	Picerno	0–1 (A)		1–1	645	3rd
17	5 December 2021	Monopoli	2–1 (H)	Valente 24', Brunori 88'	3–0	6,407	2nd
18	12 December 2021	Catania	0–2 (A)		3–2	9,239	3rd
19	19 December 2021	Bari	0–0 (H)		4–0	10,249	4th
20	22 December 2021	Latina	0–1 (A)		3–2	928	5th
23	24 January 2022	Catanzaro	0–0 (A)		2–0	2,154	6th
24	30 January 2022	Monterosi	2–0 (H)	Damiani 56', Felici 86'	4–0	4,748	6th
21	2 February 2022	ACR Messina	2–2 (H)	Brunori 13', Valente 41'	2–0	5,068	7th
25	6 February 2022	Campobasso	2–2 (A)	Brunori (2) 17', 86'	3–0	2,500	7th
26	12 February 2022	Juve Stabia	3–1 (H)	Brunori (2) 7', 49', Giron 25'	3–1	4,628	6th
27	15 February 2022	Foggia	1–4 (A)	Brunori 24'	1–0	4,000	6th
28	19 February 2022	Turris	5–0 (H)	Sbraga 10' (o.g.), Floriano 43', Brunori 52', Luperini 56', Soleri 90'	4–0	4,598	5th
29	26 February 2022	Virtus Francavilla	1–2 (A)	Brunori 73' (pen.)	1–0	1,000	6th
30	5 March 2022	Vibonese	3–0 (H)	Valente 51', Brunori 81', Soleri 84'	3–0	4,259	6th
31	13 March 2022	Avellino	2–1 (A)	Brunori 15', Valente 49'	3–0	3,000	6th
32	16 March 2022	Fidelis Andria	1–1 (H)	Luperini 85'	2–0	11,402	6th
33	20 March 2022	Potenza	2–2 (A)	Soleri 78', Brunori 90' (pen.)	2–0	1,411	6th
34	27 March 2022	Paganese	2–2 (A)	Brunori 45+1' (pen.), Valente 55'	1–1	950	6th
22	30 March 2022	Taranto	5–2 (H)	Luperini (2) 3', 69', Brunori (2) 35', 41', Soleri 90+1'	3–0	4,203	5th
35	3 April 2022	Picerno	4–0 (H)	Brunori (2) 36', 47', Floriano 64', Soleri 81'	1–0	5,271	5th
36	9 April 2022	Monopoli	2–0 (A)	Valente 19', Brunori 77'	3–0	1,003	2nd
37	16 April 2022	Catania	(H)				4th
38	24 April 2022	Bari	2–0 (A)	Floriano 25', Brunori 58' (pen.)	3–0	25,872	3rd

=== Promotion play-offs ===
Round	Date	Opponents	Result	Scorers	Y–R	Att.
Third round - First leg	8 May 2022	Triestina	2–1 (A)	Floriano (2) 41', 45+4'	3–0	7,178
Third round - Second leg	12 May 2022	Triestina	1–1 (H)	Luperini 90+6'	3–0	31,801
Quarter-finals - First leg	17 May 2022	Virtus Entella	2–1 (A)	Luperini 46', Brunori 53' (pen.)	4–0	4,486
Quarter-finals - Second leg	21 May 2022	Virtus Entella	2–2 (H)	Soleri 78', Fella 83'	4–0	33,024
Semi-finals - First leg	25 May 2022	Feralpisalò	3–0 (A)	Brunori 43', Floriano 45+2', Soleri 86'	3–0	2,198
Semi-finals - Second leg	29 May 2022	Feralpisalò	1–0 (H)	Brunori 45+2'	0–0	35,037
Final - First leg	5 June 2022	Padova	1–0 (A)	Floriano 10'	2–0	13,117
Final - Second leg	12 June 2022	Padova	1–0 (H)	Brunori 25' (pen.)	2–0	34,010

=== Coppa Italia Serie C ===
Round	Date	Opponents	Result	Scorers	Y–R	Att.
First Round	21 August 2021	Picerno	4–1 (H)	Lancini 12', Floriano 15' (pen.), Luperini 53', Fella 84'	0–0	2,119
Second Round	15 September 2021	Monopoli	2–1 (H)	Fella 20' (pen.), Valente 25'	4–0	1,008
Round of 16	3 November 2021	Catanzaro	0–1 (A)		0–0	423

== Statistics ==
=== Appearances, goals and disciplinary record ===
Sources: Lega Pro, Soccerway, Tuttocalciatori.net, Aic.football

Second yellow cards are counted as straight red cards.

Statistics in round brackets include the away match against Catania on 12 December 2021.

No.	Pos.	Name	Serie C				Play-offs				Coppa Italia Serie C				Total			
No.	Pos.	Name		Goal	Yellow card	Red card		Goal	Yellow card	Red card		Goal	Yellow card	Red card		Goal	Yellow card	Red card
1	GK	(Italy) Alberto Pelagotti	30 (31)	0	1	1	0	0	1	0	1	0	0	0	31 (32)	0	2	1
3	DF	(France) Maxime Giron	27	1	5	1	7	0	1	0	1	0	0	0	35	1	6	1
4	DF	(Italy) Andrea Accardi	15 (16)	0	3 (4)	0	1	0	0	0	0	0	0	0	16 (17)	0	3 (4)	0
5	DF	(The Gambia) Bubacarr Marong	4	0	1	0	0	0	0	0	3	0	0	0	7	0	1	0
6	DF	(Italy) Roberto Crivello	16 (17)	0	2	0	6	0	1	0	1	0	0	0	23 (24)	0	3	0
7	FW	(Italy) Roberto Floriano	28 (29)	5	2	0	7	4	0	0	3	1	0	0	38 (39)	10	2	0
9	FW	(Italy) Matteo Brunori	36 (37)	25	4	0	8	4	1	0	3	0	0	0	47 (48)	29	5	0
10	FW	(Italy) Andrea Silipo	21 (22)	2	3	0	4	0	0	0	3	0	0	0	28 (29)	2	3	0
11	MF	(Italy) Jacopo Dall'Oglio	29 (30)	0	11	0	5	0	3	0	3	0	1	0	37 (38)	0	15	0
12	GK	(Italy) Samuele Massolo	7	0	0	0	8	0	1	0	2	0	0	0	17	0	1	0
13	GK	(Italy) Giovanni Grotta	0	0	0	0	0	0	0	0	0	0	0	0	0	0	0	0
15	DF	(Italy) Ivan Marconi	24 (25)	0	7	1	8	0	1	0	2	0	1	0	34 (35)	0	9	1
16	DF	(Italy) Carlo Mannina	0	0	0	0	0	0	0	0	0	0	0	0	0	0	0	0
16	DF	(Italy) Michele Somma	6	0	1	0	1	0	0	0	0	0	0	0	7	0	1	0
17	MF	(Italy) Gregorio Luperini	33 (34)	4	5	0 (1)	8	2	0	0	3	1	0	0	44 (45)	7	5	0 (1)
19	MF	(Ghana) Moses Odjer	27 (28)	0	4	2	4	0	1	0	3	0	1	0	34 (35)	0	6	2
20	MF	(Italy) Francesco De Rose	34 (35)	0	12 (13)	0	7	0	3	0	3	0	0	0	44 (45)	0	15 (16)	0
21	MF	(Italy) Samuele Damiani	15	1	1	0	6	0	2	0	0	0	0	0	21	1	3	0
22	GK	(Italy) Giuseppe Misseri	0	0	0	0	0	0	0	0	0	0	0	0	0	0	0	0
23	FW	(Italy) Giuseppe Fella	27 (28)	4	2	0	5	1	0	0	2	2	0	0	34 (35)	7	2	0
25	DF	(Italy) Alessio Buttaro	21 (22)	0	2	2	8	0	1	0	2	0	1	0	31 (32)	0	4	2
27	FW	(Italy) Edoardo Soleri	35 (36)	10	5 (6)	0	8	2	0	0	3	0	0	0	46 (47)	12	5 (6)	0
29	DF	(Italy) Alberto Almici	14 (15)	2	3	0 (1)	0	0	0	0	2	0	0	0	16 (17)	2	3	0 (1)
30	MF	(Italy) Nicola Valente	30 (31)	7	4	0	8	0	1	0	2	1	0	0	40 (41)	8	5	0
31	FW	(Italy) Giacomo Corona	2	0	0	0	0	0	0	0	0	0	0	0	2	0	0	0
33	DF	(Italy) Marco Perrotta	24	0	5	1	3	0	1	0	1	0	0	0	28	0	6	1
36	DF	(Italy) Enrico Mauthe	1	0	0	0	0	0	0	0	0	0	0	0	1	0	0	0
54	DF	(Italy) Manuel Peretti	6	0	0	0	0	0	0	0	1	0	0	0	7	0	0	0
65	MF	(Ivory Coast) Aziz Toure	0	0	0	0	0	0	0	0	0	0	0	0	0	0	0	0
75	FW	(Italy) Mattia Felici	11	1	1	0	0	0	0	0	0	0	0	0	11	1	1	0
77	DF	(Albania) Masimiliano Doda	12	0	1	1	0	0	0	0	1	0	0	0	13	0	1	1
79	DF	(Italy) Edoardo Lancini	26	1	8	1	7	0	3	0	2	1	0	0	35	2	11	1
Own goals			—	1	—			0	—			0	—			1	—	
Totals			—	64	93 (96)	10 (12)	—	13	21	0	—	6	4	0	—	83	118 (121)	10 (12)

=== Goals conceded and clean sheets ===
Name	Serie C		Play-offs		Coppa Italia Serie C		Total	
Name	GC	CS	GC	CS	GC	CS	GC	CS
(Italy) Alberto Pelagotti	29 (31)	13	0	0	1	0	30 (32)	13
(Italy) Samuele Massolo	4	4	5	4	2	0	11	8
Totals	33 (35)	16 (Note: Since Massolo kept a clean sheet against Latina on matchday 20 but Pelagotti conceded a goal in the same match, the statistics Totals refers to clean sheets kept by the team.)	5	4	3	0	41 (43)	20

=== Attendances ===
	Matches	Attendances	Average	Highest	Lowest
Serie C	18	103,641	5,758	11,402	2,500
Play-offs	4	133,872	33,468	35,037	31,801
Coppa Italia Serie C	2	3,127	1,564	2,119	1,008
Totals	24	240,640	10,027	35,037	1,008
