= Samuele Massolo =

Italian footballer

Personal information
- Date of birth: 4 May 1996 (age 30)
- Place of birth: La Spezia, Italy
- Height: 1.85 m (6 ft 1 in)
- Position: Goalkeeper

Team information
- Current team: Sampdoria
- Number: 96

Youth career
- –2016: Sampdoria

Senior career*
Years	Team	Apps	(Gls)
2015–2017	Sampdoria	0	(0)
2016–2017	→ Sanremese (loan)	32	(0)
2017–2020	Virtus Entella	18	(0)
2020	Sambenedettese	7	(0)
2020–2021	Fermana	2	(0)
2021–2023	Palermo	15	(0)
2023–2026	Vicenza	6	(0)
2026–	Sampdoria	0	(0)
- * Club domestic league appearances and goals as of 19 September 2026

Samuele Massolo (born 4 May 1996) is an Italian professional footballer who plays as a goalkeeper for Serie B club Sampdoria.

== Career ==
Massolo started his career with Sampdoria, where he was part of their youth system and was also handed a first-team number during the 2014–15 season.

He was successively loaned out to Serie D amateurs Sanremese, with whom he made his senior debut as a player, marking a total 32 appearances and keeping 12 clean sheets during his stay at the club. His quality appearances won him interest from Serie B club Virtus Entella, who signed him permanently.

In January 2020, Massolo was signed by Serie C side Sambenedettese on a permanent deal. After being released by Sambenedettese, he joined Serie C club Fermana in October 2020;

In July 2021, Massolo signed for Serie C fallen giants Palermo, his signing being explicitly requested by head coach Giacomo Filippi, who had worked with him during his days as Roberto Boscaglia's assistant at Virtus Entella. Originally signed as an understudy to first choice goalkeeper Alberto Pelagotti, he started being occasionally featured in the starting lineup under new head coach Silvio Baldini, who then promoted him as the first choice goalkeeper for the promotion playoffs, which Palermo eventually won.

On 7 September 2022, he signed a contract extension until 30 June 2024.

On 18 July 2023, after a single Serie B season as a reserve to Mirko Pigliacelli and no first-team appearances, Massolo left Palermo on a permanent transfer to join Serie C club Vicenza.

On 1 September 2026, Massolo returned to his first club Sampdoria on a two-season contract, with an option for a third season.

== Career statistics ==
=== Club ===
As of 10 May 2024

Appearances and goals by club, season and competition
Club	Season	League			National cup		Other		Total	
Club	Season	Division	Apps	Goals	Apps	Goals	Apps	Goals	Apps	Goals
Sanremese	2016–17	Serie D	34	0	1	0	—		35	0
Virtus Entella	2017–18	Serie B	0	0	0	0	0	0	0	0
Virtus Entella	2018–19	Serie C	15	0	0	0	2 (Note: All appearance(s) in Supercoppa di Serie C.)	0	17	0
Virtus Entella	2019–20	Serie B	0	0	0	0	—		0	0
Virtus Entella	Total		15	0	0	0	2	0	17	0
Sambenedettese (loan)	2019–20	Serie C	7	0	0	0	0	0	7	0
Fermana	2020–21	Serie C	2	0	0	0	0	0	2	0
Palermo	2021–22	Serie C	7	0	2	0	8 (Note: All appearance(s) in promotion play-offs.)	0	17	0
Palermo	2022–23	Serie B	0	0	0	0	0	0	0	0
Palermo	Total		7	0	2	0	8	0	17	0
Vicenza	2023–24	Serie C	3	0	2	0	0	0	5	0
Career total			68	0	5	0	10	0	83	0
