= Enrico Mauthe =

Italian footballer (born 2004)

Personal information
- Full name: Enrico Mauthe Von Degerfeld
- Date of birth: 27 April 2004 (age 22)
- Place of birth: Palermo, Italy
- Height: 1.86 m (6 ft 1 in)
- Positions: Central midfielder; central defender

Youth career
- –2015: Calcio Sicilia
- 2015–2017: Terzo Tempo
- 2017–2018: Palermo
- 2018–2019: Empoli
- 2019–: Palermo

Senior career*
Years	Team	Apps	(Gls)
2021–2023	Palermo	1	(0)
2022–2023	→ Sambenedettese (loan)	23	(0)
2023–2024	Arconatese	34	(3)
2024	Arzignano	0	(0)
2024–2025	Ravenna	6	(0)
- * Club domestic league appearances and goals as of 4 May 2025

Enrico Mauthe Von Degerfeld (born 27 April 2004) is an Italian professional footballer who plays as a defender.

== Club career ==
=== Palermo ===
Born in Palermo, he starts playing football in CEI and Calcio Sicilia. In 2015 he moved to Terzo Tempo, a well-known football school in the Sicilian capital, and then moved to Palermo on 21 September 2017. The following year he moved to Empoli, where he played for a year, and later returned to Palermo.

In the summer of 2021, he was called up by Giacomo Filippi to be part of the first team squad, later making his senior debut on 20 November 2021 during a home Serie C league game against Paganese.

=== Later years ===
On 2 September 2022, Mauthe was loaned out to Serie D fallen giants Sambenedettese until the end of the season. Seven days after his arrival, Mauthe made his debut for the Samb in 0–2 loss against Cynthialbalonga.

He immediately became a key player in Sambenedettese's defence, playing fourteen games straight until the Serie D 0–0 draw against Vastogirardi in which he suffered muscle aches.

After being released by Palermo, he joined Serie D club Arconatese, with whom he played the 2023–24 season. On 22 July 2024, Mauthe signed for Serie C club Arzignano.

== Career statistics ==
=== Club ===
As of 30 January 2023

Appearances and goals by club, season and competition
Club	Season	League			National cup		Other		Total	
Club	Season	Division	Apps	Goals	Apps	Goals	Apps	Goals	Apps	Goals
Palermo	2021–22	Serie C	1	0	0	0	0	0	1	0
Sambenedettese	2022–23	Serie D	14	0	0	0	0	0	14	0
Career total			15	0	0	0	0	0	15	0
