= Alessandro Romairone =

Italian footballer (born 1999)

Personal information
- Date of birth: 5 December 1999 (age 26)
- Place of birth: Vercelli, Italy
- Height: 1.80 m (5 ft 11 in)
- Position: Forward

Team information
- Current team: Gozzano
- Number: 18

Youth career
- –2016: Pro Vercelli
- 2016–2018: Sassuolo
- 2017–2018: → Genoa (loan)

Senior career*
Years	Team	Apps	(Gls)
2018–2019	Carpi	1	(0)
2019–2021	Pro Vercelli	29	(0)
2021–2023	Derthona	65	(15)
2023	Sambenedettese	12	(1)
2023–2024	Grosseto	18	(4)
2024	Prato	13	(1)
2025	Pro Vercelli	14	(0)
2025–2026	Biellese	14	(0)
2026–	Gozzano	13	(4)
- * Club domestic league appearances and goals as of 25 June 2026

Alessandro Romairone (born 5 December 1999) is an Italian footballer who plays as a forward for Serie D club Gozzano.

== Club career ==
Romairone made his professional debut in the Serie B for Carpi on 19 January 2019 against Foggia, coming in as a substitute for Alessio Sabbione in the 86th minute.

On 2 September 2019, he signed with Serie C club Pro Vercelli.

On 30 October 2021, he moved to Derthona in Serie D.

== Family ==
He is the son of former footballer Giancarlo Romairone.
