= Jacopo Dall'Oglio =

Italian footballer

Personal information
- Date of birth: 2 April 1992 (age 34)
- Place of birth: Milazzo, Italy
- Height: 1.83 m (6 ft 0 in)
- Position: Midfielder

Team information
- Current team: Milazzo
- Number: 23

Youth career
- Reggina

Senior career*
Years	Team	Apps	(Gls)
2011–2015	Reggina	52	(2)
2011–2012	→ Pavia (loan)	11	(0)
2012–2013	→ Barletta (loan)	8	(1)
2015–2019	Brescia	64	(3)
2019–2021	Catania	42	(6)
2021–2022	Palermo	29	(0)
2022–2024	Avellino	33	(3)
2024–2025	Reggina	14	(1)
2025–	Milazzo	11	(1)
- * Club domestic league appearances and goals as of 25 January 2026

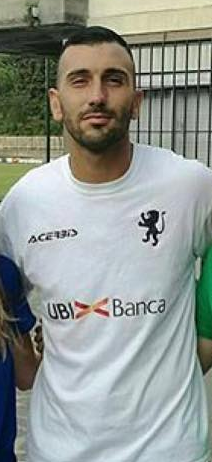
Dall'Oglio in 2017

Jacopo Dall'Oglio (born 2 April 1992) is an Italian footballer who plays for Serie D club Milazzo.

== Biography ==
Born in Milazzo, Sicily, Dall'Oglio started his career at another side of the Strait of Messina. In 2011, he was signed by Pavia. On 7 July 2012 Dall'Oglio was signed by Barletta. He followed Reggina relegated to 2014–15 Lega Pro. The club was excluded from the professional leagues in July 2015.

On 10 July 2015 Dall'Oglio was signed by Brescia. He wore no.31 shirt for Brescia in 2015–16 Serie B.

On 24 July 2019 he signed a 3-year contract with Serie C club Catania.

He then left Catania for Sicilian rivals Palermo, being part of the squad that won promotion to Serie B following the 2021–22 season. On 27 July 2022, he left Palermo to join Serie C side Avellino.

== Career statistics ==
=== Club ===
As of 12 June 2022

Appearances and goals by club, season and competition
Club	Season	League			National cup		Other		Total	
Club	Season	Division	Apps	Goals	Apps	Goals	Apps	Goals	Apps	Goals
Reggina	2010–11	Serie B	1	0	0	0	—		1	0
Reggina	2013–14	Serie B	36	1	2	0	—		38	1
Reggina	2014–15	Lega Pro	15	1	1	0	0	0	16	1
Reggina	Total		52	2	3	0	0	0	55	2
Pavia (loan)	2011–12	Lega Pro Prima Divisione	11	0	3	0	0	0	14	0
Barletta (loan)	2012–13	Lega Pro Prima Divisione	8	1	1	0	2 (Note: All appearance(s) in relegation play-outs.)	0	11	1
Brescia	2015–16	Serie B	23	1	2	0	—		25	1
Brescia	2016–17	Serie B	12	1	0	0	—		12	1
Brescia	2017–18	Serie B	12	0	0	0	—		12	0
Brescia	2018–19	Serie B	17	1	1	0	—		18	1
Brescia	Total		64	3	3	0	0	0	67	3
Catania	2019–20	Serie C	17	1	1+3	0	0	0	21	1
Catania	2020–21	Serie C	25	5	0	0	1 (Note: All appearance(s) in promotion play-offs.)	0	26	5
Catania	Total		42	6	4	0	1	0	47	6
Palermo	2021–22	Serie C	29	0	3	0	5	0	37	0
Career total			206	12	17	0	8	0	231	12
