= Maxime Giron =

French footballer (born 1994)

Personal information
- Full name: Maxime Françoise Jean Giron
- Date of birth: 15 September 1994 (age 32)
- Place of birth: Gonesse, France
- Height: 1.85 m (6 ft 1 in)
- Position: Defender

Youth career
- ASM Omnisports
- –2012: Clermont Foot

Senior career*
Years	Team	Apps	(Gls)
2012–2013	Montichiari	15	(0)
2013	Portugalete	0	(0)
2013–2014	Selargius	12	(1)
2014–2015	Chieti	33	(2)
2015–2017	Avellino	11	(0)
2016	→ Melfi (loan)	15	(2)
2016–2017	→ Reggiana (loan)	14	(1)
2017	→ Juve Stabia (loan)	7	(0)
2017–2018	Bisceglie	28	(1)
2018–2019	Potenza	18	(0)
2019	→ Bisceglie (loan)	13	(0)
2020	Modena	1	(0)
2020–2021	Bisceglie	33	(0)
2021–2022	Palermo	27	(1)
2022–2025	Crotone	81	(4)
2025–2026	Trapani	15	(1)
2026	Foggia	14	(0)
- * Club domestic league appearances and goals as of 1 May 2026

Maxime Françoise Jean Giron (born 15 September 1994) is a French professional footballer who plays as a defender.

== Club career ==
He made his Serie B debut for Avellino on 6 September 2015 in a game against Salernitana.

On 25 January 2019, he returned to Bisceglie.

On 9 January 2020, he signed with Serie C club Modena until the end of the 2019–20 season. After one more season with Bisceglie ending with relegation, Giron successively spent the 2021–22 season with Palermo, being part of the lineup that won promotion to Serie B through playoffs.

On 27 July 2022, he successively left Palermo to join recently-relegated Serie C club Crotone.

On 18 January 2026, he joined Foggia.

== Career statistics ==
=== Club ===
As of 12 June 2022

Appearances and goals by club, season and competition
Club	Season	League			National cup		Other		Total	
Club	Season	Division	Apps	Goals	Apps	Goals	Apps	Goals	Apps	Goals
Montichiari	2012–13	Serie D	15	0	0	0	—		15	0
Portugalete	2013–14	Tercera División	0	0	—		—		0	0
Selargius	2013–14	Serie D	12	1	—		1	0	13	1
Chieti	2014–15	Serie D	33	2	1	0	—		34	2
Avellino	2015–16	Serie B	11	0	0	0	—		11	0
Melfi (loan)	2015–16	Lega Pro	15	2	0	0	1 (Note: All appearance(s) in relegation play-outs.)	0	16	2
Reggiana (loan)	2016–17	Lega Pro	14	1	1+2	0	—		17	1
Juve Stabia (loan)	2016–17	Lega Pro	7	0	0	0	0	0	7	0
Bisceglie	2017–18	Serie C	28	1	2	0	—		30	1
Potenza	2018–19	Serie C	18	0	1	0	—		19	0
Bisceglie (loan)	2018–19	Serie C	13	0	0	0	4	0	17	0
Modena	2019–20	Serie C	1	0	0	0	—		1	0
Bisceglie	2020–21	Serie C	33	0	—		2	0	35	0
Bisceglie	Bisceglie total		74	1	2	0	6	0	82	1
Palermo	2021–22	Serie C	27	1	1	0	7 (Note: All appearance(s) in promotion play-offs.)	0	35	1
Career total			227	8	8	0	15	0	250	8
