= Marco Perrotta =

Italian footballer

Personal information
- Date of birth: 14 February 1994 (age 32)
- Place of birth: Campobasso, Italy
- Height: 1.84 m (6 ft 0 in)
- Position: Defender

Team information
- Current team: Catania
- Number: 5

Youth career
- –2011: Pescara

Senior career*
Years	Team	Apps	(Gls)
2011–2014	Pescara	1	(0)
2012–2014	→ Paganese (loan)	36	(0)
2014–2016	Teramo	63	(3)
2016–2019	Pescara	50	(0)
2016–2017	→ Avellino (loan)	24	(1)
2019–2023	Bari	48	(3)
2021–2022	→ Palermo (loan)	24	(0)
2022–2023	→ Pro Vercelli (loan)	30	(2)
2023–2026	Padova	74	(4)
2026–	Catania	2	(0)
- * Club domestic league appearances and goals as of 29 August 2026

Marco Perrotta (born 14 February 1994) is an Italian footballer who plays as a defender for Serie C Group C club Catania.

== Club career ==
On 1 September 2022, Perrotta joined Pro Vercelli on loan.

On 26 August 2023, Perrota signed a two-year contract with Padova.

== Career statistics ==
=== Club ===
As of 12 June 2022

Appearances and goals by club, season and competition
Club	Season	League			National cup		Other		Total	
Club	Season	Division	Apps	Goals	Apps	Goals	Apps	Goals	Apps	Goals
Pescara	2010–11	Serie B	1	0	0	0	—		1	0
Pescara	2011–12	Serie B	0	0	0	0	—		0	0
Pescara	2012–13	Serie A	0	0	0	0	—		0	0
Paganese (loan)	2012–13	Lega Pro Prima Divisione	10	0	0	0	—		10	0
Paganese (loan)	2013–14	Lega Pro Prima Divisione	26	0	1	0	—		27	0
Paganese (loan)	Total		36	0	1	0	0	0	37	0
Teramo	2014–15	Lega Pro	35	2	1+1	0	2 (Note: All appearance(s) in Supercoppa di Lega Pro.)	0	39	2
Teramo	2015–16	Lega Pro	28	1	3	0	—		31	1
Teramo	Total		63	3	5	0	2	0	70	3
Pescara	2017–18	Serie B	32	0	2	0	—		34	0
Pescara	2018–19	Serie B	18	0	1	0	0	0	19	0
Pescara	Pescara total		51	0	3	0	0	0	54	0
Avellino (loan)	2016–17	Serie B	24	1	1	0	—		25	1
Bari	2019–20	Serie C	28	2	1	0	2 (Note: All appearance(s) in promotion play-offs.)	0	31	2
Bari	2020–21	Serie C	20	1	2	0	1	0	23	1
Bari	Total		48	3	3	0	3	0	54	3
Palermo (loan)	2021–22	Serie C	24	0	1	0	3	0	28	0
Career total			246	7	14	0	8	0	268	7
