= Roberto Floriano =

Italian footballer

Personal information
- Date of birth: 14 August 1986 (age 40)
- Place of birth: Albstadt, West Germany
- Height: 1.71 m (5 ft 7 1/2 in)
- Position: Forward

Team information
- Current team: Caravaggio (sporting director)

Youth career
- FV 07 Albstadt
- 1998–2005: Internazionale
- 2002–2003: → Legnano (loan)

Senior career*
Years	Team	Apps	(Gls)
2005–2006	Seregno	28	(1)
2006–2010	Colognese	104	(32)
2010–2012	Tritium	37	(6)
2012	Alessandria	11	(0)
2012	Botev Vratsa	3	(0)
2013	Pistoiese 1921	13	(8)
2013–2014	Mantova	33	(19)
2014	Barletta	18	(6)
2015	Pisa	18	(3)
2015–2016	Foggia	22	(3)
2016–2017	Carrarese	29	(11)
2017–2018	Foggia	20	(5)
2018–2020	Bari	37	(13)
2020–2023	Palermo	80	(15)
2023	Sangiuliano City	15	(0)
2023–2024	Desenzano	21	(2)
- * Club domestic league appearances and goals as of 6 January 2023

Roberto Floriano (born 14 August 1986) is an Italian retired footballer who played as a forward, and the current sporting director of Caravaggio.

== Playing career ==
=== Youth career ===
Born in Albstadt, Baden-Württemberg, Floriano moved back to Italy at young age. He played for Lombardy side Legnano and in July 2003 returned to Internazionale. In 2003–04 season he was promoted to Berretti under-20 team (B team of under-20). He also played once for Azzurri in a training match, which he borrowed to Italy national team against Inter Berretti, partnered with Bernardo Corradi. In 2004–05 season he remained at Berretti and scored 5 goals in regular season and twice more in playoffs. The team losing to Juventus 3–4 aggregate in the finals. That season he also played a few matches for the U-20 A team: Primavera, scored his only goal in Inter Primavera 5–0 Verona Primavera. He was released at the end of season.

=== Serie D ===
From 2005–06 to 2009–10 he played in Serie D (Italian fifth level until 2014). Despite called non-professional level, the players could receive some compensation and the amount was regulated by FIGC. He played for Seregno and then moved to Colognese. He scored 10 league goals in 2009–10 season (in Serie D Group B).

=== Serie C ===
In July 2010 he was signed by 2010 Serie D Group B champion Tritium. He played 23 times in 2010–11 Lega Pro Seconda Divisione (Group A), scored 5 goals. The team won the champion and promoted to Italian third level, in which he played 14 times, scoring also one goal. On 26 January 2012 he moved to Alessandria, in Lega Pro Seconda Divisione. After playing 3 matches with Bulgarian Botev Vratsa which he had joined in the summer of 2012, in January 2013 he moved to Pistoiese, in Serie D.

In July 2013 he was signed by Lega Pro Seconda Divisione club Mantova F.C. On 10 January 2014 he signed a new contract which last until 30 June 2017. He scored 19 goals as the joint-second topscorer of the whole division. The club also qualified as the 8th of Group A for the next season, a unified Serie C since it was split into two divisions in 1978.

In July 2014 he was signed by Lega Pro Prima Divisione club Barletta.

On 2 January 2015 he has been presented as a new player of A.C. Pisa 1909. The player signed a contract that will keep him under the leaning tower of Pisa until 30 June 2018.

On 27 June 2015 he was signed by Foggia for an undisclosed fee. But in the following year, he left for Carrarese on a temporary deal.

In June 2018 he was signed for SSC Bari in Serie D (forth division) and during the regular season he scored 12 goals, being instrumental in the club's immediate promotion to Serie C. He left Bari in January 2020 to join another phoenix club, Palermo, being part of the Rosanero winning campaign that led them to Serie C. He was subsequently confirmed also in the two following Serie C seasons for the Sicilians.

During the 2021–22 Serie C season, Floriano turned out to be instrumental during Palermo's successful promotion playoff campaign, scoring several deciding goals, including the winning one in the first leg final against Padova. On 14 July 2022, Palermo formally extended Floriano's contract for one more year, thus giving him the chance to play again in the Serie B at the age of 36.

On 6 January 2023, Floriano joined Serie C side Sangiuliano City on a permanent deal, signing a contract until June 2024.

On 21 July 2023, Floriano signed for Serie D amateurs Desenzano.

== Post-playing career ==
Floriano retired from active football by the end of the 2023–24 season in order to become the new sporting director of Serie D club Caravaggio.

== Career statistics ==
=== Club ===
As of 12 June 2022

Appearances and goals by club, season and competition
Club	Season	League			National cup		Other		Total	
Club	Season	Division	Apps	Goals	Apps	Goals	Apps	Goals	Apps	Goals
Seregno	2005–06	Serie D	28	1	—		—		28	1
Colognese	2006–07	Serie D	17	6	?	0	—		17+	6
Colognese	2007–08	Serie D	26	5	2	2	?	0	28+	7
Colognese	2008–09	Serie D	32	11	1+	1	2	0	35+	12
Colognese	2009–10	Serie D	29	10	?	0	—		29+	10
Colognese	Total		104	32	3+	3	2+	0	109+	35
Tritium	2010–11	Lega Pro Seconda Divisione	23	5	5	1	2	0	30	6
Tritium	2011–12	Lega Pro Prima Divisione	14	1	1+(1+)	0+1	—		16+	2
Tritium	Total		37	6	7+	2	2	0	46+	8
Alessandria	2011–12	Lega Pro Seconda Divisione	11	0	—		—		11	0
Botev Vratsa	2012–13	Parva liga	3	0	?	0	—		3+	0
Pistoiese	2012–13	Serie D	13	8	—		3	2	16	10
Mantova	2013–14	Lega Pro Seconda Divisione	33	19	1	0	—		34	19
Barletta	2014–15	Lega Pro	18	6	2	2	—		20	8
Pisa	2014–15	Lega Pro	18	3	0	0	—		18	3
Foggia	2015–16	Lega Pro	22	3	2+5	3+2	2 (Note: All appearance(s) in promotion play-offs.)	0	31	8
Carrarese	2016–17	Lega Pro	29	11	1	0	2 (Note: All appearance(s) in relegation play-outs.)	0	32	11
Foggia	2017–18	Serie B	20	5	1	0	—		21	5
Foggia	Foggia total		42	8	8	5	2	0	52	13
Bari	2018–19	Serie D	28	13	1	0	2	0	31	3
Bari	2019–20	Serie C	9	0	1	0	—		10	0
Bari	Total		37	13	2	0	2	0	41	13
Palermo	2019–20	Serie D	8	6	0	0	—		8	6
Palermo	2020–21	Serie C	28	4	—		4	2	32	6
Palermo	2021–22	Serie C	28	5	3	1	7	4	38	10
Palermo	Total		64	15	3	1	11	6	78	22
Career total			437	122	27+	13	24+	8	488+	143

== Honours ==
- Lega Pro Seconda Divisione: 2010
