= Giuseppe Fella =

Italian footballer

Personal information
- Date of birth: 11 August 1993 (age 33)
- Place of birth: Montebelluna, Italy
- Height: 1.77 m (5 ft 10 in)
- Position: Forward

Team information
- Current team: Cavese
- Number: 10

Youth career
- –2011: Cavese
- 2011–2012: Cittadella
- 2012: Avellino

Senior career*
Years	Team	Apps	(Gls)
2013	Campobasso	16	(3)
2013–2014	Brindisi	30	(5)
2014–2015	Melfi	37	(5)
2015–2016	Bassano	2	(0)
2016	Siena	8	(0)
2016	Siracusa	0	(0)
2016–2017	Nocerina	27	(5)
2017–2019	Cavese	63	(22)
2019–2020	Monopoli	28	(17)
2020–2022	Salernitana	0	(0)
2020–2021	→ Avellino (loan)	34	(9)
2021–2022	→ Palermo (loan)	32	(5)
2022–2025	Palermo	0	(0)
2022–2023	→ Monopoli (loan)	36	(2)
2023–2024	→ Latina (loan)	33	(5)
2024–2025	→ Cavese (loan)	29	(11)
2025–	Cavese	29	(2)
- * Club domestic league appearances and goals as of 1 May 2026

Giuseppe Fella (born 11 August 1993) is an Italian professional footballer who plays as a forward for Serie C Group C club Cavese.

== Career ==
Fella started playing football in Cittadella Youth Sector. In January 2013, he moved to Campobasso where he scored three goals in 16 appearances. In the summer of 2013, he moved to Serie D side Brindisi scoring five goals in 30 appearances. In 2014, Fella re-joined to play in Serie C for Melfi, scoring five goals and five assists. Fella moved to Bassano in 2015, and in January 2016, he moved to Siena 1904, scoring no goals in both teams. In the summer of 2016, Fella returned to Serie D, joining Nocerina, making six goals. In 2017, Fella moved to Cavese, making in the 2017–18 season 13 goals leading his side to promotion play-offs which were won by beating Taranto. On 3 August 2018, Serie C announced that Cavese would be promoted to Serie C. Fella made in the 2018–19 season, 11 goals in 30 appearances. In 2019, he moved to Monopoli, and he scored 16 goals in 26 appearances in the 2019–20 season who was curtailed due to the COVID-19 pandemic in Italy. After this season, Salernitana bought him. However, Salernitana loaned him to Avellino where he scored nine goals in 34 appearances. Fella was loaned to Palermo on 23 July 2021, with a conditional obligation to buy.

After Palermo won promotion to Serie B after winning the playoff tournament, Fella was signed permanently as part of an automatic buy clause. On 31 August 2022, he was loaned out to Serie C club Monopoli.

On 1 August 2023, he joined Latina. On 27 July 2024, he was loaned out to Serie C club Cavese, with an obligation to buy.

His contract with Palermo expired on 30 June 2025.

== Career statistics ==
=== Club ===
As of 12 June 2022

Appearances and goals by club, season and competition
Club	Season	League			National Cup		Other		Total	
Club	Season	Division	Apps	Goals	Apps	Goals	Apps	Goals	Apps	Goals
Campobasso	2012–13	Lega Pro Seconda Divisione	16	3	—		—		16	3
Brindisi	2013–14	Serie D	30	5	2	0	—		32	5
Melfi	2014–15	Lega Pro	37	5	2	0	—		39	5
Bassano	2015–16	Lega Pro	2	0	2+2	0	—		6	0
Siena	2015–16	Lega Pro	8	0	2	1	—		10	1
Siracusa	2016–17	Lega Pro	0	0	0	0	—		0	0
Nocerina	2016–17	Serie D	27	5	1	0	2	1	30	6
Cavese	2017–18	Serie D	32	11	2	0	2	2	36	13
Cavese	2018–19	Serie C	31	11	2	0	—		33	11
Cavese	Total		63	22	4	0	2	2	69	24
Monopoli	2019–20	Serie C	28	17	1	0	1 (Note: All appearance(s) in promotion play-offs.)	0	30	17
Avellino (loan)	2020–21	Serie C	34	9	—		5	0	39	9
Palermo (loan)	2021–22	Serie C	27	4	2	2	5	1	34	7
Career total			272	70	18	3	15	4	305	77
