= Simone Romagnoli =

Italian footballer (born 1990)

Personal information
- Date of birth: 9 February 1990 (age 36)
- Place of birth: Cremona, Italy
- Height: 1.94 m (6 ft 4 in)
- Position: Centre-back

Team information
- Current team: Empoli
- Number: 6

Youth career
- 1997–2007: Cremonese
- 2007–2010: AC Milan

Senior career*
Years	Team	Apps	(Gls)
2010–2011	AC Milan	0	(0)
2010–2011	→ Foggia (loan)	23	(3)
2011–2013	Pescara	35	(0)
2013	→ Spezia (loan)	14	(0)
2013–2018	Carpi	127	(5)
2017–2018	→ Empoli (loan)	20	(0)
2018–2022	Empoli	81	(3)
2018	→ Bologna (loan)	8	(0)
2018–2019	→ Brescia (loan)	35	(2)
2022–2023	Parma	6	(0)
2023	Lecce	7	(0)
2023–2025	Frosinone	33	(1)
2024–2025	→ Sampdoria (loan)	11	(0)
2025–2026	Sampdoria	0	(0)
2026–	Empoli	4	(0)

International career
2012–2013	Italy U21	6	(0)
- * Club domestic league appearances and goals as of 22 August 2026

Simone Romagnoli (born 9 February 1990) is an Italian professional footballer who plays as a centre-back for Serie B club Empoli.

== Club career ==
=== Early career ===
Born in Cremona, Romagnoli joined Milan from Cremonese in January 2007, shortly before turning 17. Throughout his time in the club's youth system, he has been a member of the under-17 squad who won the Campionato Nazionale Allievi in 2007, as well as the captain of the under-20 side who won the Coppa Italia Primavera in 2010, 25 years after their last success.

During the 2009–10 season, Romagnoli also started being selected for the first-team. In particular, he was named on the bench for a league match against Palermo, though he did not come on.

=== Foggia ===
In order to gain some first team experience, Romagnoli was loaned out to Prima Divisione club Foggia for the 2010–11 season. He made his official debut for the club in the first game of the Coppa Italia Lega Pro group stage against L'Aquila — which Foggia won 2–1 – on 14 August 2010. The next week, in the first league game of the season, he also scored his maiden goal with a header from a corner.

=== Pescara ===
On 8 July 2011, after the end of the loan to the Foggia, he moved from Milan to the Serie B team Pescara on a co-ownership deal.

=== Parma ===
On 24 June 2022, Romagnoli signed with Parma.

=== Lecce ===
On 31 January 2023, Romagnoli joined Lecce in Serie A.

=== Sampdoria ===
On 21 July 2024, Romagnoli moved to Sampdoria on loan with an obligation to buy in July 2025.

=== Return to Empoli ===
On 28 January 2026, he returned to Empoli.

== International career ==
He made his debut with the Italy U-21 team on 4 June 2012, in a match against Republic of Ireland.

== Career statistics ==
=== Club ===
As of match played 24 November 2024

Appearances and goals by club, season and competition
Club	Season	League			National Cup (Note: Includes Coppa Italia)		Europe		Other		Total	
Club	Season	Division	Apps	Goals	Apps	Goals	Apps	Goals	Apps	Goals	Apps	Goals
Foggia (loan)	2010–11	Lega Pro 1	23	3	0	0	—		—		23	3
Pescara	2011–12	Serie B	28	0	1	0	—		—		29	0
Pescara	2012–13	Serie A	7	0	1	0	—		—		8	0
Pescara	Total		35	0	2	0	—		—		37	0
Spezia (loan)	2012–13	Serie B	14	0	—		—		—		14	0
Carpi	2013–14	Serie B	32	2	1	0	—		—		33	2
Carpi	2014–15	Serie B	32	3	1	0	—		—		33	3
Carpi	2015–16	Serie A	30	0	3	0	—		—		33	0
Carpi	2016–17	Serie B	33	0	2	0	—		5 (Note: Appearance(s) in Serie B play-off)	0	40	0
Carpi	Total		127	5	7	0	—		5	0	139	5
Empoli (loan)	2017–18	Serie B	20	0	1	0	—		—		21	0
Bologna (loan)	2017–18	Serie A	8	0	—		—		—		8	0
Brescia (loan)	2018–19	Serie B	35	2	0	0	—		—		35	2
Empoli	2019–20	Serie B	31	0	1	0	—		1	0	33	0
Empoli	2020–21	Serie B	31	1	0	0	—		—		31	1
Empoli	2021–22	Serie A	19	2	3	0	—		—		22	2
Empoli	Total		81	3	4	0	—		1	0	86	3
Parma	2022–23	Serie B	6	0	1	0	—		—		7	0
Lecce	2022–23	Serie A	7	0	—		—		—		7	0
Frosinone	2023–24	Serie A	33	1	1	0	—		—		34	1
Sampdoria (loan)	2024–25	Serie B	11	0	2	0	—		—		13	0
Career total			400	14	18	0	—		6	0	424	14

== Honours ==
Pescara

- Serie B: 2011–12

Carpi

- Serie B: 2014–15

Brescia

- Serie B: 2018–19

Empoli

- Serie B: 2020–21
