= Luigi Carillo =

Italian footballer

Personal information
- Date of birth: 8 August 1996 (age 30)
- Place of birth: Naples, Italy
- Height: 1.88 m (6 ft 2 in)
- Position: Centre-back

Team information
- Current team: Latina
- Number: 33

Youth career
- –2014: Juve Stabia

Senior career*
Years	Team	Apps	(Gls)
2014–2016	Juve Stabia	11	(0)
2014–2015	→ Catania (loan)	1	(0)
2016–2017	Akragas	17	(0)
2017–2018	Pescara	0	(0)
2017	→ Paganese (loan)	15	(0)
2017–2018	→ Pisa (loan)	18	(1)
2018–2021	Genoa	0	(0)
2018–2019	→ Brescia (loan)	0	(0)
2019	→ Salernitana (loan)	0	(0)
2019–2020	→ Sambenedettese (loan)	16	(0)
2020–2021	→ Casertana (loan)	33	(6)
2021–2022	ACR Messina	31	(0)
2022–2023	Novara	31	(1)
2023–2025	Foggia	37	(0)
2025–2026	Sorrento	17	(0)
2026–	Latina	10	(0)
- * Club domestic league appearances and goals as of 1 May 2026

Luigi Carillo (born 8 August 1996) is an Italian professional footballer who plays as a centre-back for Serie C Group B club Latina.

== Career ==
He made his Serie B debut for Juve Stabia on 30 May 2014 in a game against Carpi. On 6 July 2018, Carillo signed with Serie A club Genoa.

On 17 August 2018, Carillo joined Serie B side Brescia on loan until 30 June 2019.

On 12 July 2019, Carillo joined Serie B club Salernitana on loan until 30 June 2020.

On 29 August 2019, after appearing just once on the bench for Salernitana, he was recalled from loan and sent on a different loan to Serie C club Sambenedettese instead.

On 16 September 2020 he joined Casertana on loan.

On 18 August 2021 he signed a two-year contract with ACR Messina.

On 26 July 2022, Carillo moved to Novara on a two-year deal.

On 30 August 2023, Carillo joined Foggia on a two-year contract.

On 9 January 2025, he joined Sorrento on permanent basis.
