= Stadio Alfredo d'Albertas =

Football stadium in Gozzano, Italy

- Stadio di Monterosso, Stadio del Marchese
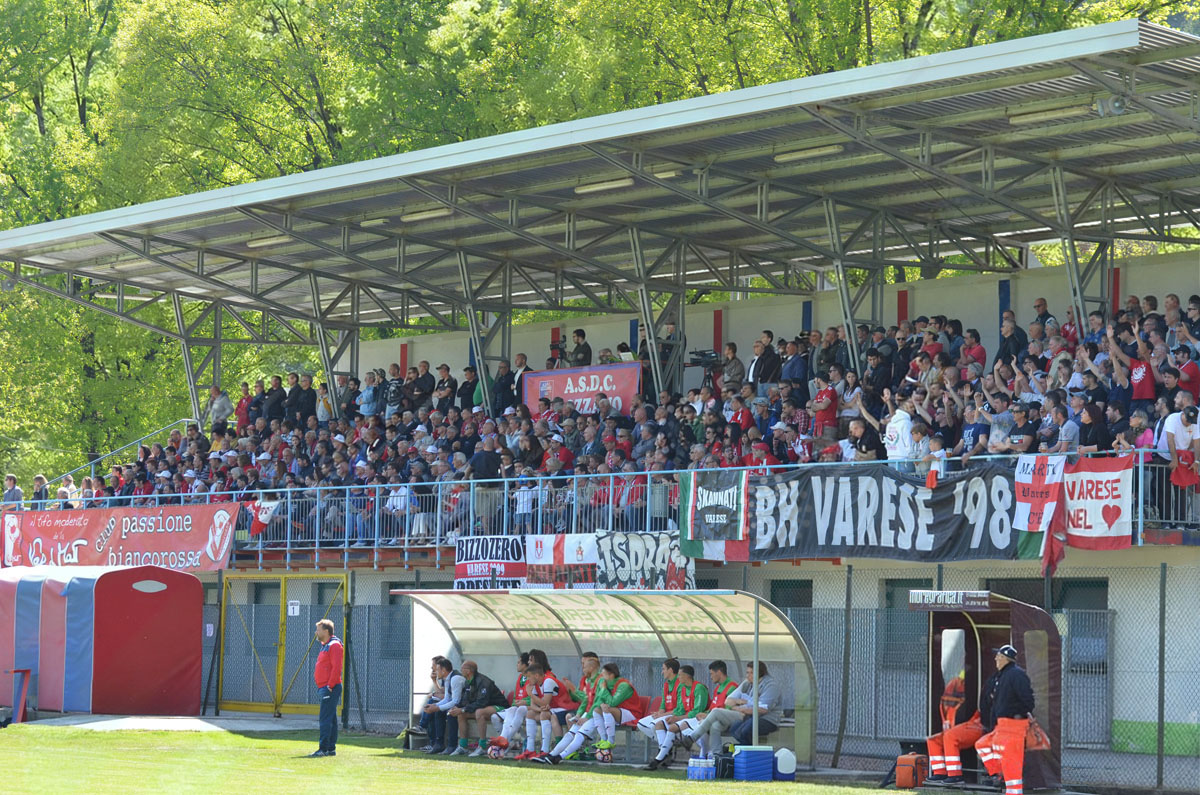
- The grandstand during a football match
- Interactive map of Stadio Alfredo d'Albertas
- Full name: Stadio comunale alla memoria del Marchese Alfredo d'Albertas
- Location: Via Madonna di Luzzara 3, I-28024 Gozzano (NO), Italy
- Coordinates: 45.757459°N 8.418694°E
- Owner: Comune di Gozzano
- Operator: A.C. Gozzano
- Capacity: 1,526
- Surface: Grass
- Scoreboard: none
- Field size: 105x65

Construction
- Groundbreaking: 1950
- Opened: 1950
- Renovated: 2018-2019
- Architect: Paolo Preti
- Structural engineer: Giuseppe Russo

Tenant
- A.C. Gozzano

The Stadio Alfredo d'Albertas is a football stadium in Gozzano, Italy, currently in use by the team A.C. Gozzano.

Constructed around 1950, and originally named Stadio di Monterosso (taking its name from the neighbourhood in which it stands), the stadium was renamed in May 1994 after A.C. Gozzano's longest-serving president (H.E. marquis Alfredo d’Albertas, 1916 – 1992).

Originally, the stadium could accommodate up to 400 spectators: however, in some circumstances (as the security regulations have allowed it) the attendance at the stadium has exceeded even 1,000 spectators, with people staying even outside the bleachers.

Between 2018 and 2019, following the first promotion of A.C. Gozzano in Serie C, the stadium was completely renovated, building up two new side stands; for safety reasons and according to the championship criteria, the maximum capacity has been set at 1,526 all-seating places.

Because of the rebuilding, A.C. Gozzano was forced to play its home games throughout the 2018–19 season (and the beginning of the 2019-20 one, too) at the Stadio Silvio Piola (Vercelli), heading back to "d'Albertas" stadium on 15 September 2019.

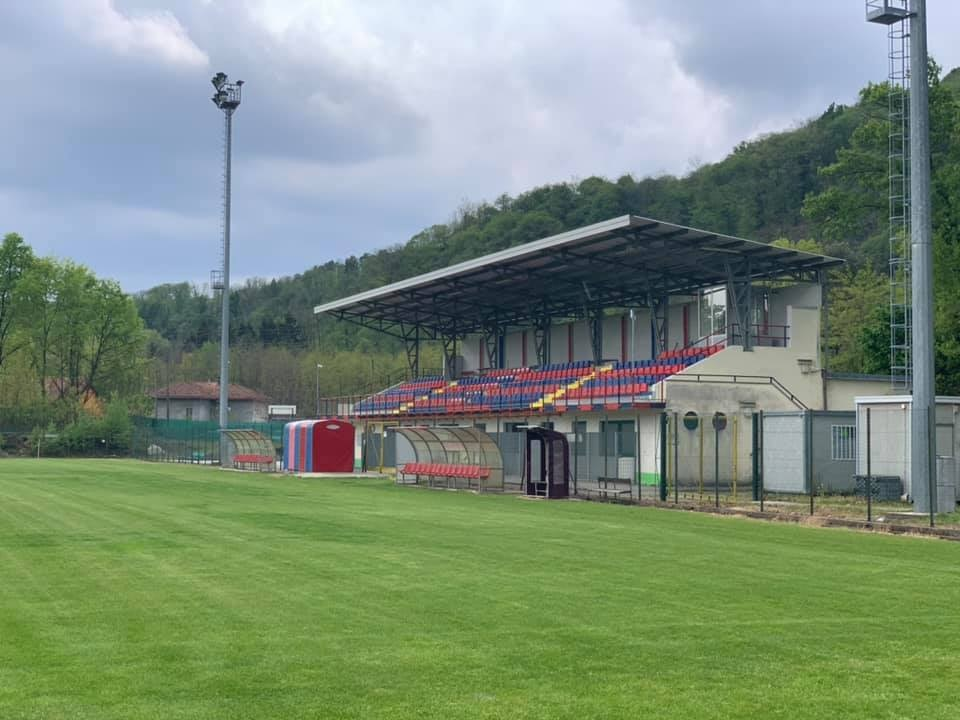
Grandstand

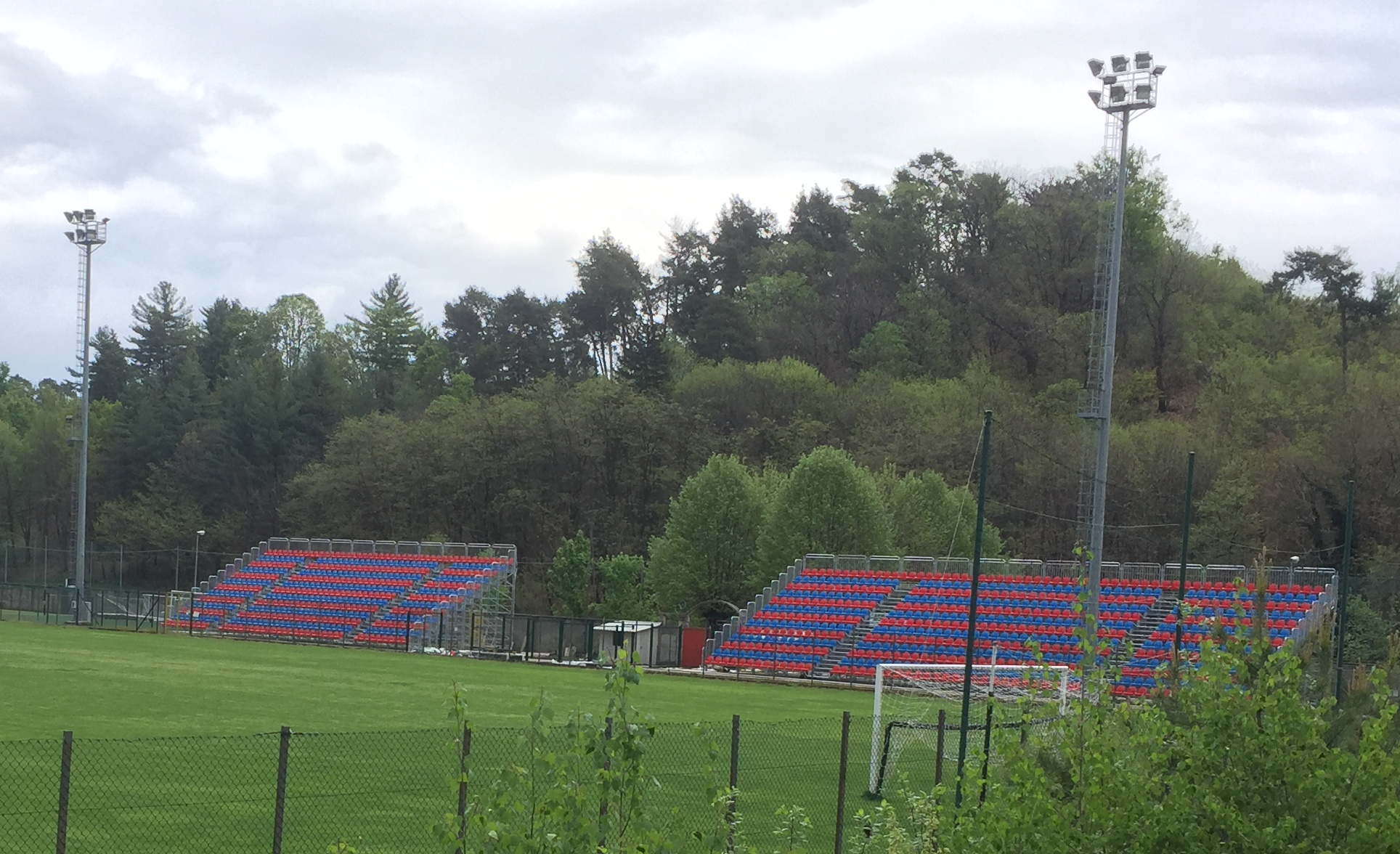
Side stands

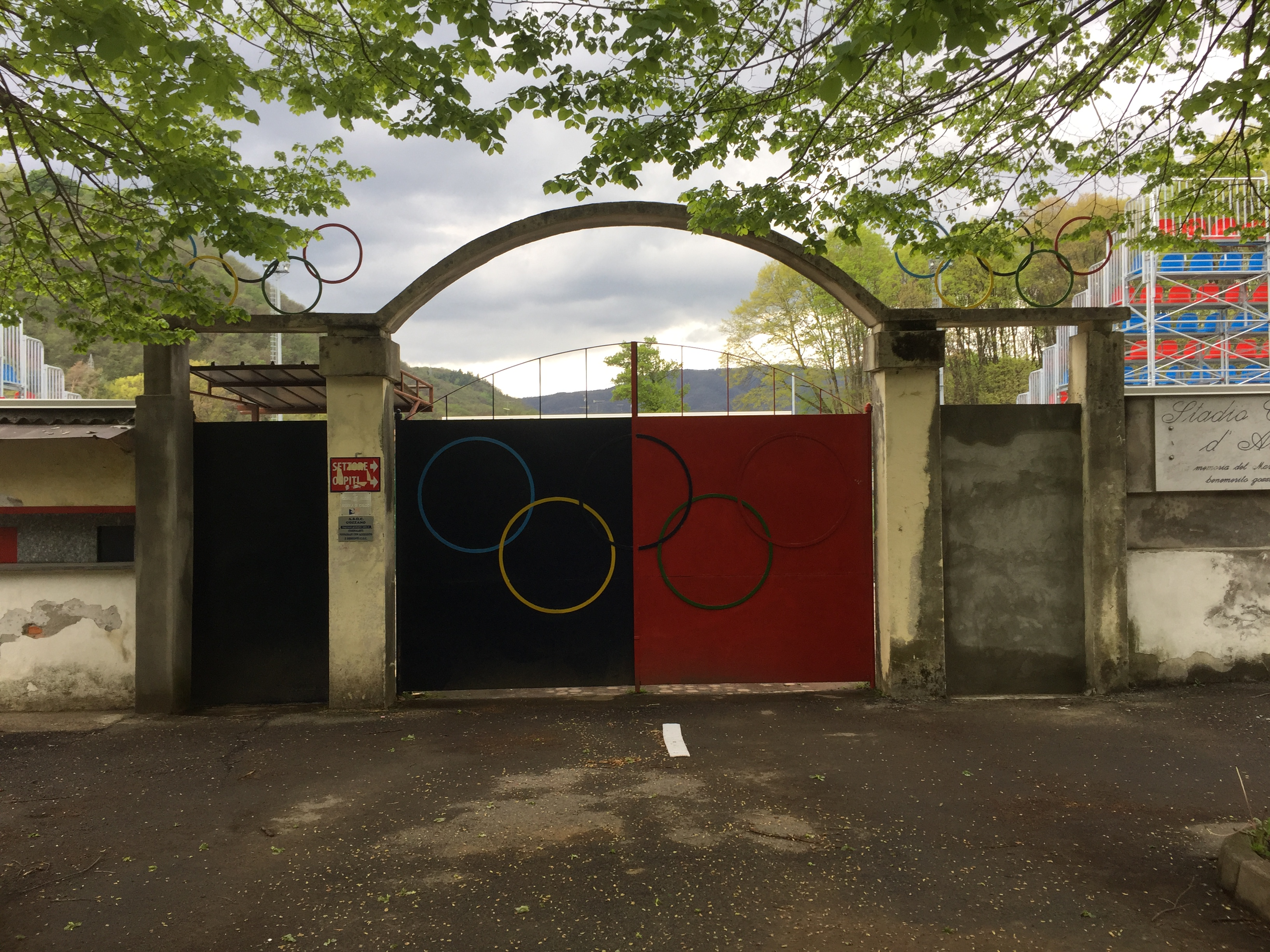
Main entrance gate

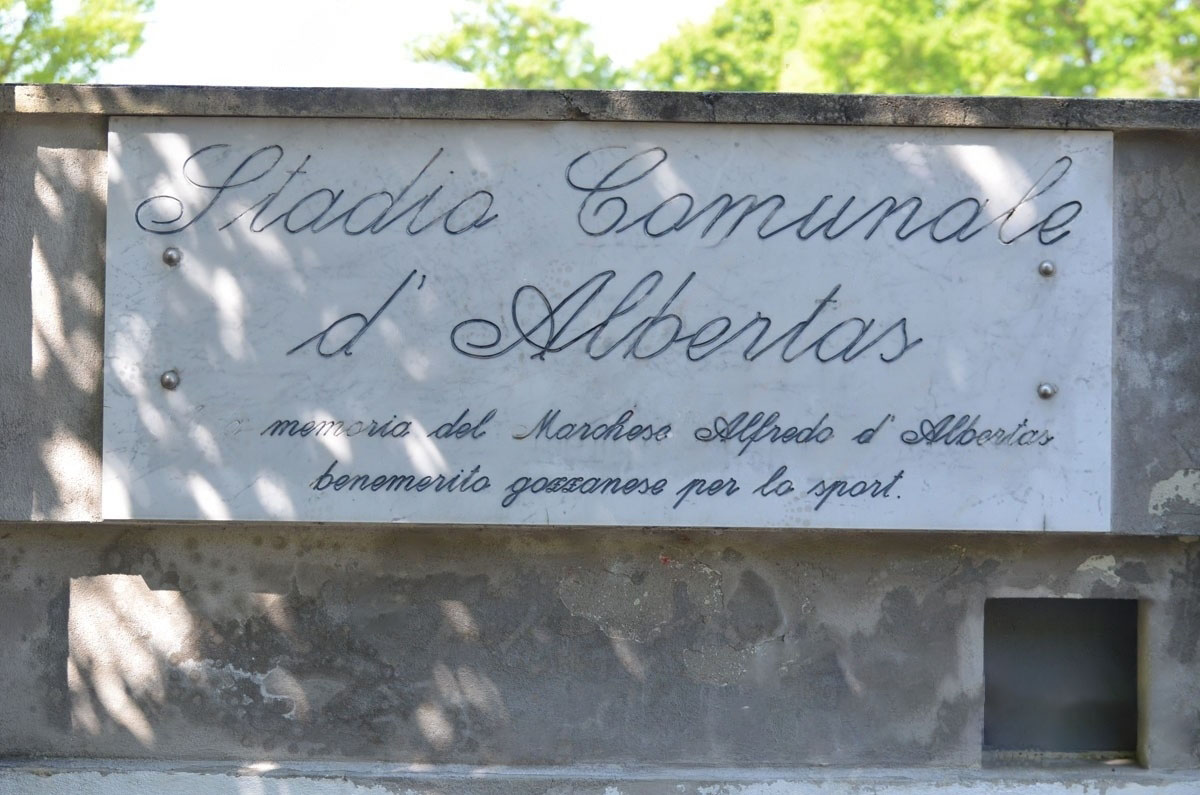
Dedication plaque

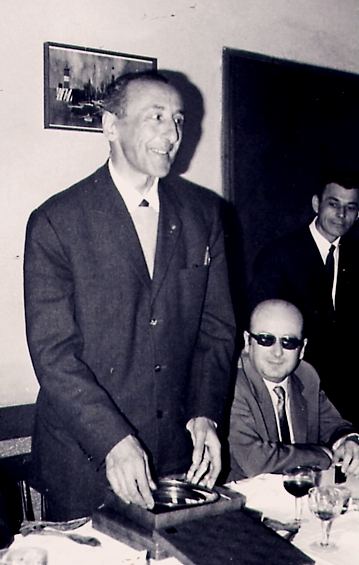
Marquis Alfredo d'Albertas
