= Felipe Curcio =

Association football player (born 1993)

Personal information
- Full name: Felipe Castaldo Curcio
- Date of birth: 6 August 1993 (age 33)
- Place of birth: Jundiaí, Brazil
- Height: 1.85 m (6 ft 1 in)
- Position: Defender

Team information
- Current team: Rudeš
- Number: 27

Youth career
- –2012: Atlético Paranaense

Senior career*
Years	Team	Apps	(Gls)
2013	Cianorte		
2013–2014	Foggia	6	(0)
2015	Lupa Roma	11	(0)
2015–2016	Martina Franca	19	(1)
2016–2018	Fidelis Andria	44	(4)
2018–2020	Brescia	33	(0)
2020–2021	Salernitana	9	(0)
2020–2021	→ Padova (loan)	33	(2)
2021–2023	Padova	33	(0)
2023–2024	Livorno	17	(1)
2024–2026	Koper	34	(4)
2026–	Rudeš	7	(0)
- * Club domestic league appearances and goals as of 2 November 2026

Felipe Castaldo Curcio (born 6 August 1993) is a Brazilian professional footballer who plays as a defender for Croatian Football League club Rudeš. He also holds Italian citizenship.

== Career ==
Curcio made his Serie C debut for Foggia on 21 September 2014 in a game against Benevento.

On 23 January 2020, he signed a contract with Salernitana until the end of the 2019–20 season with an option to extend it for two more seasons. On 5 October 2020, he was loaned to Padova.
