= Leonardo Morosini =

Italian footballer (born 1995)

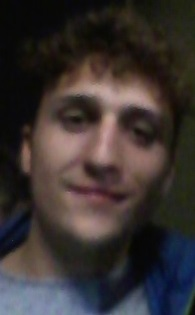

Personal information
- Date of birth: 13 October 1995 (age 31)
- Place of birth: Ponte San Pietro, Italy
- Height: 1.80 m (5 ft 11 in)
- Position: Attacking midfielder

Team information
- Current team: Carpi

Youth career
- 2003–2008: Internazionale
- 2008–2009: AlbinoLeffe
- 2009–2013: Brescia

Senior career*
Years	Team	Apps	(Gls)
2014–2017	Brescia	77	(14)
2017–2018	Genoa	4	(0)
2017–2018	→ Avellino (loan)	10	(3)
2018–2020	Brescia	29	(4)
2020	→ Ascoli (loan)	19	(6)
2020–2023	Virtus Entella	61	(10)
2023–2024	Carrarese	19	(2)
2024–2026	Novara	53	(6)
2026–	Carpi	0	(0)

International career
2015–2016	Italy U20	3	(1)
2016	Italy U21	1	(0)
- * Club domestic league appearances and goals as of 30 April 2026

Leonardo Morosini (born 13 October 1995) is an Italian footballer who plays as an attacking midfielder for Serie C Group A club Carpi.

== Club career ==
=== Brescia ===
Morosini was a youth exponent from Brescia Calcio. He made his senior debut for the club on 10 May 2014 against Reggina Calcio in a Serie B game.

=== Genoa ===
On 5 January 2017, Morosini signed for Serie A side Genoa. He will wear the number 32 jersey.

=== Return to Brescia ===
On 26 June 2018, he returned to Brescia, signing a 4-year contract.

==== Loan to Ascoli ====
On 16 January 2020, he was loaned to Serie B club Ascoli until the end of the 2019–20 season.

=== Entella ===
On 1 October 2020, he moved to Virtus Entella.

=== Novara ===
On 22 July 2024, Morosini signed a two-season contract with Novara.

== International career ==
He made his debut with the Italy U21 team on 11 October 2016, in the last 2017 European U21 Championship qualification match against Lithuania in Kaunas.

== Honours ==
Brescia

- Serie B: 2018–19

Individual

- Serie B Footballer of the Year: 2015–16
