= Andrea Sbraga =

Italian footballer (born 1992)

Personal information
- Date of birth: 14 January 1992 (age 34)
- Place of birth: Rome, Italy
- Height: 1.92 m (6 ft 4 in)
- Position: Centre back

Team information
- Current team: Foligno
- Number: 26

Youth career
- –2011: Atletico Roma
- 2011–2012: Lazio

Senior career*
Years	Team	Apps	(Gls)
2012–2014	Lazio	0	(0)
2012–2013	→ Pisa (loan)	25	(0)
2013–2014	→ Salernitana (loan)	8	(0)
2014	→ Carrarese (loan)	11	(0)
2014–2016	Carrarese	47	(1)
2016–2017	Padova	32	(1)
2017–2018	Siena	32	(1)
2018–2021	Novara	57	(1)
2021	Arezzo	19	(1)
2021–2023	Avellino	3	(1)
2022	→ Turris (loan)	8	(0)
2023–2024	Potenza	44	(1)
2024–2025	Pro Vercelli	13	(0)
2025–	Foligno	18	(2)
- * Club domestic league appearances and goals as of 22 February 2026

Andrea Sbraga (born 14 January 1992) is an Italian professional footballer who plays as a centre back for Serie D club Foligno.

== Club career ==
On 15 July 2021 Sbraga joined Avellino. On 27 January 2022, he moved to Turris on loan. Sbraga's contract with Avellino was terminated by mutual consent on 31 January 2023.

On 7 February 2023, Sbraga signed with Potenza.

On 30 August 2024, Sbraga moved to Pro Vercelli.
