= AC Gozzano =

Italian football team based in Gozzano (NO)

Gozzano
- Full name: A.S.D.C. Gozzano
- Nicknames: Rossoblù (red-blues); Cusiani; Guzon; Malgascìtt; Juventina; Rubinettai (tap-makers)
- Founded: 1920
- Ground: Stadio Alfredo d'Albertas, Gozzano
- Capacity: 1,526
- Chairman: Fabrizio Leonardi; Marilena Fornara Allesina (honorary)
- Manager: Vinicio Espinal
- League: Serie D Group A
- 2023–24: Serie D Group A, 12th of 20
- Website: http://www.acgozzano.it
Home colours	Away colours	Third colours

A.S.D.C. Gozzano also known as Associazione Sportiva Dilettantistica Calcio Gozzano, Associazione Calcio Gozzano, or simply Gozzano, is an Italian association football club, based in Gozzano, Piedmont. Gozzano currently plays in Serie D.

== History ==
The club was founded on the 1 April 1920 as Club Sportivo Juventus, and later adopted the current name. It became member of the FIGC (Italian Football Federation) in 1924.

After playing consistently for many decades in the amateur league of Piedmont, in the 1978–79 season the team was promoted to Serie D for the first time; it then reached the category again in 2010–11 and 2014–15 seasons.

After more than 9 decades spent competing in the Italian amateur leagues, in the 2017–18 season the club won the A group of Serie D, and was promoted to the Serie C, reaching a professional championship for the first time in its history. It was then relegated to Serie D in the 2019–20 season.

== Colors and badge ==
The team's historic colors are red and blue.

From 1985 to 1995 the players wore red and white halved shirts derived from the colours of the town emblem (which is also pictured into the club badge).

== Stadiums ==
Since the 1950s, A.C. Gozzano's home stadium is Stadio Alfredo d'Albertas on 3 Via Madonna di Luzzara, Monterosso. Totally renovated and upgraded in 2019 after "cusiani" team's first promotion to Serie C, the stadium is named after the club's longest serving president (H.E. marquis Alfredo d’Albertas, 1916 – 1992) and has a seating capacity of approx 1,500.

As the stadium wasn't ready to use for the 2018–19 season, Gozzano used Stadio Silvio Piola on 5 Via Massaua, Vercelli as the venue for most part of its home games (both in 2018-19 Serie C and 2018–19 Coppa Italia Serie C).

The club also used Stadio Silvio Piola of Novara for the opening match of 2018–19 Serie C.

After a couple more official matches played in Vercelli at the beginning of 2019–20 season, Gozzano headed back to "d'Albertas" stadium on September 15, 2019.
