= Giacomo Filippi =

Italian footballer and coach

Personal information
- Date of birth: 27 October 1975 (age 51)
- Place of birth: Partinico, Italy
- Height: 1.89 m (6 ft 2 in)
- Position: Left back

Senior career*
Years	Team	Apps	(Gls)
1993–1995	Partinico Audace		
1995–1996	Messina		
1996	Ternana	2	(0)
1996–1997	Fano	10	(0)
1997–1999	Marsala	32	(1)
1999–2002	Treviso	73	(1)
2002–2004	Taranto	53	(5)
2004–2005	Foggia	25	(0)
2005–2006	Gela	31	(1)
2006–2007	Teramo	14	(0)
2007–2008	Valle del Giovenco	26	(0)
2008–2009	Vigor Lamezia	26	(0)
2009–2013	Trapani	105	(8)

Managerial career
- 2021: Palermo
- 2022: Viterbese
- 2024: Recanatese
- * Club domestic league appearances and goals

Giacomo Filippi (born 27 October 1975) is an Italian football coach and former defender.

== Playing career ==
Filippi started his career with his hometown amateur club, Partinico Audace. In 1996, he moved into professionalism with then-Serie C2 club Ternana. In 1999, he was signed by Serie B club Treviso, playing three seasons as a regular for the Venetians (two of which were in the Italian second division).

He successively spent a number of seasons with different teams at Serie C1 and Serie C2 level until joining Trapani of Serie D in 2009; with Trapani, he won three promotions, all the way up to Serie B, as team captain under the management of Roberto Boscaglia. He retired in 2013, after winning promotion to Serie B.

== Coaching career ==
After retiring as a player, he accepted to stay at Trapani as a youth coach for the Allievi team. In 2015, he was called by his former manager Roberto Boscaglia as his assistant at Brescia.

Successively, Filippi followed Boscaglia on all of his later coaching jobs at Novara, Brescia for a second time, Virtus Entella and, in 2020, Palermo.

On 27 February 2021, Filippi was promoted to head coach of Palermo after the Rosanero board decided to sack Boscaglia from his role. Under his tenure in the second half of the 2020–21 Serie C season, results significantly improved and Palermo manage to qualify to the promotion playoffs, from where they were eliminated in the third round by third-placed Avellino. These positive results led Palermo to confirm that Filippi was also in charge of the first team for the following 2021–22 Serie C season. He was dismissed from his position on 24 December 2021, following a 0–2 loss against Latina that left Palermo in fifth place, eleven points behind league leaders Bari.

On 1 July 2022, Filippi was announced as the new head coach of Serie C club Viterbese, signing a one-year deal with the club. He was dismissed on 14 November 2022 following a negative start of the season.

On 15 February 2024, Filippi was hired as the new head coach of Serie C club Recanatese. He was confirmed in charge of the club also for the following season, despite having suffered relegation to Serie D in the end, but was eventually dismissed on 5 November 2024 after a dismal start in the club's 2024–25 Serie D campaign.

== Managerial statistics ==
As of match played 22 December 2021

Managerial record by team and tenure
Team	Nat	From	To	Record								Ref
Team	Nat	From	To	G	W	D	L	GF	GA	GD	Win %	Ref
Palermo	(Italy)	27 February 2021	24 December 2021	36	20	8	8	53	31	+22	55.56	
Viterbese	(Italy)	1 July 2022	14 November 2022	15	4	5	6	18	22	−4	26.67	
Career Total				51	24	13	14	71	53	+18	47.06	—
