= 2019–20 Serie C =

Serie C
- Season: 2019–20
- Dates: 24 August 2019 – 22 July 2020
- Champions: Monza; Vicenza; Reggina
- Promoted: Monza; Vicenza; Reggina; Reggio Audace
- Relegated: Siena (bankruptcy); Pianese; Gozzano; Arzignano; Rimini; Sicula Leonzio (bankruptcy); Rende; Rieti; Picerno (match-fixing)
- Matches: 868
- Goals: 2,017 (2.32 per match)
- Top goalscorer: Mirco Antenucci (21 goals)
- Biggest home win: Padova 6–1 Fano (1 September 2019); Casertana 6–1 Rieti (14 September 2019); Viterbese 6–1 Rende (19 October 2019); Vibonese 5–0 Catania (20 October 2019); Südtirol 5–0 Arzignano (2 February 2020)
- Biggest away win: Sicula Leonzio 2–7 Vibonese (1 December 2019)
- Highest scoring: Avellino 3–6 Catania (25 August 2019); Sicula Leonzio 2–7 Vibonese (1 December 2019)
- Longest winning run: 11 games Reggina
- Longest unbeaten run: 25 games Bari
- Longest winless run: 22 games Olbia
- Longest losing run: 8 games Fano
- Highest attendance: 16,092; Reggina 1–1 Bari (26 January 2020)
- Lowest attendance: 40; Pianese 2–2 AlbinoLeffe (26 January 2020) (Note: Starting 8 March 2020, due to the coronavirus pandemic in Italy, all matches have been played behind closed doors.)
- Total attendance: 2,252,566
- Average attendance: 2,740

The 2019–20 Serie C was the 61st season of the Serie C, the third tier of the Italian football league system, organized by the Lega Pro. The season was scheduled to run from 24 August 2019 to 26 April 2020, however, on 9 March 2020, the Italian government halted the league until 3 April 2020 due to the COVID-19 pandemic in Italy. Serie C did not resume play on this date. On 18 May, it was announced that Italian football would be suspended until 14 June.

On 8 June, the Italian Football Federation formally declared Monza, Vicenza, and Reggina as champions of their respective groups, thus awarding them promotion to Serie B, while also confirming the promotion and relegations playoff will take place as planned, based on the league standings by the time of the regular season suspension.

== Teams ==
The league was contested by 60 teams.

=== Relegated from Serie B ===
- Padova
- Carpi

Venezia was readmitted in Serie B after the bankruptcy of Palermo.

=== Promoted from Serie D ===
- Lecco (Girone A winners)
- Como (Girone B winners)
- Arzignano Valchiampo (Girone C winners)
- Pergolettese (Girone D winners)
- Pianese (Girone E winners)
- Cesena (Girone F winners)
- Avellino (Girone G winners)
- Picerno (Girone H winners)
- Bari (Girone I winners)

=== Readmissions ===
Following the disbandment of Arzachena, Lucchese and Siracusa and the failure of Albissola to register for the league, four relegated clubs were readmitted as members of Serie C.

- Virtus Verona
- Fano
- Paganese
- Bisceglie

=== Repechages ===
Following the bankruptcy of Foggia (relegated from Serie B) and Palermo, FIGC chose two historic big clubs from Serie D to fill the vacancies.

- Modena
- Reggio Audace

=== Bisceglie readmission and Audace Cerignola case ===
On 12 July, the FIGC additionally excluded Arzachena from Serie C, but Bisceglie were not initially readmitted and were awaiting the result of court proceedings, along with Audace Cerignola. As a result, one vacancy remained in Group C that had not been filled, due to a lack of valid applications for Serie C readmissions.

On 23 July, the Court of the CONI overturned the original decision from the FIGC by declaring both Bisceglie and Audace Cerignola's readmission requests as valid, thus creating uncertainty on the new format and even opening doors to a potential 21-team Group C.

On 25 July, the FIGC readmitted Bisceglie to Serie C, whereas, in spite of the ruling by the Court of the CONI, Audace Cerignola's request was rejected due to alleged stadium irregularities. On August 5, however, CONI once again overturned the FIGC's decision not to admit Audace Cerignola to Serie C.

On 10 September, Lazio's Regional Administrative Tribunal denied Audace Cerignola's appeal for readmission, by suspending the measures for which CONI had used to readmit the club into Serie C. A new hearing was set for February 11, 2020, at which time a repecheage would no longer be possible, which effectively left the club in Serie D.

=== COVID-19 pandemic suspension ===
On 9 March 2020, the Lega Pro committee announced the suspension of the league due to the COVID-19 pandemic in Italy.

On 8 May 2020, the league committee formally proposed the Italian Football Federation to end the season altogether and award promotion to the three league toppers (Monza, Vicenza and Reggina), plus Carpi for having the highest point-per-game ratio among all other teams by the time of the suspension, and block all relegations to Serie D. This proposal was however rejected by the Italian Football Federation on 20 May, as they objected the Serie C season will have to end as planned, with 20 August as the formal deadline to complete it.

On 8 June, the Italian Football Federation formally declared the end of the Serie C regular season; Monza, Vicenza and Reggina were awarded promotion to Serie B, while Gozzano, Rimini and Rieti were relegated to Serie D. Promotion and relegation playoffs will take place as planned, albeit on a voluntary basis.

Following the deliberation from the Italian Football Federation, Pontedera, Arezzo, Modena, Pro Patria, Piacenza and Vibonese announced they would not take part to the promotion playoffs.

== Stadia and locations ==
=== Group A (North & Central West) ===
8 teams from Lombardy, 6 teams from Tuscany, 5 teams from Piedmont and 1 team from Sardinia.

Location of teams in Serie C (Group A) 2019–20
Location of teams in 2019–20 Serie C (Group A) (Lombardy)

Club	City	Stadium	Capacity
AlbinoLeffe	Albino and Leffe	Città di Gorgonzola (Gorgonzola)	3,766
Alessandria	Alessandria	Giuseppe Moccagatta	5,827
Arezzo	Arezzo	Città di Arezzo	13,128
Carrarese	Carrara	Dei Marmi	9,500
Como	Como	Giuseppe Sinigaglia	13,602
Giana Erminio	Gorgonzola	Città di Gorgonzola	3,766
Gozzano	Gozzano	Stadio Alfredo d'Albertas	1,510
Juventus U23	Turin	Giuseppe Moccagatta (Alessandria)	5,827
Lecco	Lecco	Rigamonti-Ceppi	4,997
Monza	Monza	Brianteo	18,568
Novara	Novara	Silvio Piola (Novara)	17,875
Olbia	Olbia	Bruno Nespoli	3,200
Pergolettese	Crema	Giuseppe Voltini	4,100
Pianese	Piancastagnaio	Carlo Zecchini (Grosseto)	9,779
Pistoiese	Pistoia	Marcello Melani	13,195
Pontedera	Pontedera	Ettore Mannucci	2,700
Pro Patria	Busto Arsizio	Carlo Speroni	4,627
Pro Vercelli	Vercelli	Silvio Piola (Vercelli)	5,500
Renate	Renate	Città di Meda (Meda)	2,900
Siena	Siena	Montepaschi Arena	15,373

=== Group B (North & Central East) ===
8 teams from Emilia-Romagna, 4 teams from Marche, 4 teams from Veneto, 1 team from Friuli-Venezia Giulia, 1 team from Lombardy, 1 team from Trentino-Alto Adige and 1 team from Umbria.

Location of teams in Serie C (Group B) 2019–20

Club	City	Stadium	Capacity
Arzignano	Arzignano	Romeo Menti (Vicenza)	13,173
Carpi	Carpi	Sandro Cabassi	5,550
Cesena	Cesena	Dino Manuzzi	20,194
Fano	Fano	Raffaele Mancini	8,800
FeralpiSalò	Salò	Lino Turina	2,364
Fermana	Fermo	Bruno Recchioni	8,920
Gubbio	Gubbio	Pietro Barbetti	4,939
Imolese	Imola	Romeo Galli	4,000
Modena	Modena	Alberto Braglia	21,092
Padova	Padua	Euganeo	32,420
Piacenza	Piacenza	Leonardo Garilli	21,668
Ravenna	Ravenna	Bruno Benelli	12,020
Reggio Audace	Reggio Emilia	Mapei Stadium – Città del Tricolore	21,584
Rimini	Rimini	Romeo Neri	7,442
Sambenedettese	San Benedetto del Tronto	Riviera delle Palme	13,705
Südtirol	Bolzano/Bozen	Druso	3,500
Triestina	Trieste	Nereo Rocco	32,454
Vicenza	Vicenza	Romeo Menti	13,173
Virtus Verona	Verona	Gavagnin Nocini	1,200
Vis Pesaro	Pesaro	Tonino Benelli	4,898

=== Group C (Center & South) ===
4 teams from Apulia, 4 teams from Calabria, 4 teams from Campania, 2 teams from Basilicata, 2 teams from Lazio, 2 teams from Sicily, 1 from Abruzzo and 1 from Umbria.

Location of teams in Serie C (Group C) 2019–20
Location of teams in 2019–20 Serie C (Group C) (Campania)

Club	City	Stadium	Capacity
Avellino	Avellino	Partenio-Adriano Lombardi	10,215
Bari	Bari	San Nicola	58,270
Bisceglie	Bisceglie	Gustavo Ventura	5,000
Casertana	Caserta	Alberto Pinto	12,000
Catania	Catania	Angelo Massimino	20,266
Catanzaro	Catanzaro	Nicola Ceravolo	14,650
Cavese	Cava de' Tirreni	Simonetta Lamberti	5,000
Monopoli	Monopoli	Vito Simone Veneziani	6,880
Paganese	Pagani	Marcello Torre	5,093
Picerno	Picerno	Alfredo Viviani (Potenza)	4,977
Potenza	Potenza	Alfredo Viviani	4,977
Reggina	Reggio Calabria	Oreste Granillo	27,454
Rende	Rende	Marco Lorenzon	5,000
Rieti	Rieti	Manlio Scopigno	10,163
Sicula Leonzio	Lentini	Angelino Nobile	2,500
Teramo	Teramo	Gaetano Bonolis	7,498
Ternana	Terni	Libero Liberati	17,460
Vibonese	Vibo Valentia	Luigi Razza	6,500
Virtus Francavilla	Francavilla Fontana	Giovanni Paolo II	2,000
Viterbese Castrense	Viterbo	Enrico Rocchi	5,460

== League tables ==
=== Group A (North & Central West) ===
Pos	Team	Pld	W	D	L	GF	GA	GD	Pts	Qualification
1	Monza (C, P)	27	18	7	2	53	18	+35	61	Promotion to Serie B
2	Carrarese	27	12	9	6	47	36	+11	45	Qualification to the promotion play-offs
3	Renate	27	11	10	6	34	22	+12	43	Qualification to the promotion play-offs
4	Pontedera (Note: Following the deliberation from the Italian Football Federation, Pontedera announced they would not take part to the promotion playoffs.)	27	11	9	7	38	35	+3	42	
5	Alessandria	27	10	10	7	34	30	+4	40	Qualification to the promotion play-offs
6	Robur Siena (Note: 1 point deduction for administral irregularities.) (D, R)	27	10	10	7	32	30	+2	39	Club dissolved
7	Novara	26	10	8	8	35	29	+6	38	Qualification to the promotion play-offs
8	AlbinoLeffe	27	10	9	8	29	24	+5	39	Qualification to the promotion play-offs
9	Arezzo (Note: Following the deliberation from the Italian Football Federation, Arezzo announced they would not take part to the promotion playoffs.)	27	8	13	6	33	28	+5	37	
10	Juventus U23	27	8	12	7	30	34	−4	36	Qualification to the promotion play-offs
11	Pro Patria (Note: Pro Patria qualified to the promotion play-offs because Coppa Italia Serie C winner Juventus U23 played in their Group. However, following the deliberation from the Italian Football Federation, Pro Patria announced they would not take part.)	26	7	11	8	32	30	+2	32	
12	Pistoiese	27	6	15	6	24	22	+2	33	
13	Como	26	7	11	8	28	25	+3	32	
14	Pro Vercelli	26	7	10	9	27	28	−1	31	
15	Lecco	26	7	7	12	27	42	−15	28	
16	Pergolettese (O)	27	6	9	12	21	36	−15	27	Qualification to the relegation play-offs
17	Giana Erminio	26	6	8	12	28	44	−16	26	Readmitted
18	Olbia (O)	27	5	10	12	28	44	−16	25	Qualification to the relegation play-offs
19	Pianese (R)	27	4	12	11	23	30	−7	24	Qualification to the relegation play-offs
20	Gozzano (R)	27	4	10	13	22	38	−16	22	Relegation to Serie D

Source: Lega Pro
Rules for classification: 1) Final score; 2) Head-to-head points; 3) Head-to-head goal difference; 4) Goal per game difference; 5) Goals per game scored; 6) Lower goals per game against; 7) Draw.

Final score is calculated according to the formula $Pts + (HPpg \times Nhg) + (APpg \times Nag)$, where:

- $Pts$ is points;
- $HPpg$ is home points per game;
- $Nhg$ is number of home games left to play;
- $APpg$ is away points per game;
- $Nag$ is number of away games left to play.
  (C) Champions; (D) Disqualified; (O) Play-off winners; (P) Promoted; (R) Relegated
  Notes:

=== Group B (North & Central East) ===
Pos	Team	Pld	W	D	L	GF	GA	GD	Pts	Qualification
1	L.R. Vicenza (C, P)	27	18	7	2	41	12	+29	61	Promotion to Serie B
2	Reggio Audace (O, P)	27	15	10	2	45	25	+20	55	Qualification to the promotion play-offs
3	Carpi	26	16	5	5	44	21	+23	53	Qualification to the promotion play-offs
4	Südtirol	27	15	3	9	43	24	+19	48	Qualification to the promotion play-offs
5	Padova	26	13	5	8	35	19	+16	44	Qualification to the promotion play-offs
6	Feralpisalò	26	12	8	6	34	31	+3	44	Qualification to the promotion play-offs
7	Piacenza (Note: Following the deliberation from the Italian Football Federation, Piacenza announced they would not take part to the promotion playoffs.)	26	10	11	5	32	24	+8	41	
8	Triestina	27	12	4	11	36	32	+4	40	Qualification to the promotion play-offs
9	Modena (Note: Following the deliberation from the Italian Football Federation, Modena announced they would not take part to the promotion playoffs.)	27	11	7	9	29	25	+4	40	
10	Sambenedettese	26	9	6	11	31	31	0	33	Qualification to the promotion play-offs
11	Fermana	27	8	9	10	22	33	−11	33	
12	Virtus Verona	27	8	8	11	33	35	−2	32	
13	Cesena	27	7	9	11	33	42	−9	30	
14	Vis Pesaro	27	7	7	13	22	37	−15	28	
15	Gubbio	27	5	13	9	23	31	−8	28	
16	Ravenna	27	7	6	14	25	41	−16	27	Readmitted
17	Imolese (O)	27	4	11	12	20	35	−15	23	Qualification to the relegation play-offs
18	Arzignano (R)	26	4	10	12	18	32	−14	22	Qualification to the relegation play-offs
19	Fano (O)	27	5	6	16	24	42	−18	21	Qualification to the relegation play-offs
20	Rimini (R)	27	4	9	14	24	42	−18	21	Relegation to Serie D

Source: Lega Pro
Rules for classification: 1) Final score; 2) Head-to-head points; 3) Head-to-head goal difference; 4) Goal per game difference; 5) Goals per game scored; 6) Lower goals per game against; 7) Draw.

Final score is calculated according to the formula $Pts + (HPpg \times Nhg) + (APpg \times Nag)$, where:

- $Pts$ is points;
- $HPpg$ is home points per game;
- $Nhg$ is number of home games left to play;
- $APpg$ is away points per game;
- $Nag$ is number of away games left to play.
  (C) Champions; (O) Play-off winners; (P) Promoted; (R) Relegated
  Notes:

=== Group C (Center & South) ===
Pos	Team	Pld	W	D	L	GF	GA	GD	Pts	Qualification
1	Reggina (C, P)	30	21	6	3	54	19	+35	69	Promotion to Serie B
2	Bari	30	16	12	2	54	24	+30	60	Qualification to the promotion play-offs
3	Monopoli	30	18	3	9	40	22	+18	57	Qualification to the promotion play-offs
4	Potenza	30	16	8	6	36	23	+13	56	Qualification to the promotion play-offs
5	Ternana	30	14	9	7	38	29	+9	51	Qualification to the promotion play-offs
6	Catania (Note: 2 points deduction for administral irregularities.)	30	13	8	9	39	38	+1	45	Qualification to the promotion play-offs
7	Catanzaro	30	12	7	11	41	36	+5	43	Qualification to the promotion play-offs
8	Teramo	30	11	8	11	29	31	−2	41	Qualification to the promotion play-offs
9	Virtus Francavilla	30	10	10	10	39	36	+3	40	Qualification to the promotion play-offs
10	Avellino	30	11	7	12	34	38	−4	40	Qualification to the promotion play-offs
11	Vibonese	30	9	12	9	48	37	+11	39	
12	Viterbese Castrense	30	11	6	13	37	38	−1	39	
13	Cavese	30	9	11	10	24	36	−12	38	
14	Paganese	30	8	12	10	35	34	+1	36	
15	Casertana (Note: 2 points deduction for administral irregularities.)	30	8	14	8	37	35	+2	36	
16	Sicula Leonzio (O, D, R)	30	7	8	15	31	46	−15	29	Club dissolved
17	Bisceglie	30	3	11	16	21	40	−19	20	Readmitted
18	Rende (R)	30	3	9	18	19	50	−31	18	Qualification to the relegation play-offs
19	Rieti (Note: 5 points deduction for administral irregularities.) (R)	30	5	5	20	29	64	−35	15	Relegation to Serie D
20	Picerno (Note: Picerno were originally the 16th-placed team and won the play-out over Rende, but were placed at the bottom of the league table for fixing the match against Bitonto during the 2018–19 Serie D on 5 May 2019, relegating them to Serie D.) (O, D, R)	30	8	8	14	29	38	−9	32	Relegation to Serie D

Source: Lega Pro
Rules for classification: 1) Final score; 2) Head-to-head points; 3) Head-to-head goal difference; 4) Goal per game difference; 5) Goals per game scored; 6) Lower goals per game against; 7) Draw.

Final score is calculated according to the formula $Pts + (HPpg \times Nhg) + (APpg \times Nag)$, where:

- $Pts$ is points;
- $HPpg$ is home points per game;
- $Nhg$ is number of home games left to play;
- $APpg$ is away points per game;
- $Nag$ is number of away games left to play.
  (C) Champions; (D) Disqualified; (O) Play-off winners; (P) Promoted; (R) Relegated
  Notes:

== Promotion play-offs ==
=== First round ===
If tied, higher-placed team advances.

Team 1	Score	Team 2
Alessandria	Cancelled	Pro Patria
Robur Siena	Cancelled	Arezzo
Novara	0–0	AlbinoLeffe
Padova	0–0	Sambenedettese
Feralpisalò	Cancelled	Modena
Piacenza	Cancelled	Triestina
Ternana	0–0	Avellino
Catania	3–2	Virtus Francavilla
Catanzaro	0–0	Teramo

=== Second round ===
If tied, higher-placed team advances.

Team 1	Score	Team 2
Pontedera	Cancelled	Novara
Alessandria	3–2	Robur Siena
Südtirol	0–1	Triestina
Padova	1–0	Feralpisalò
Potenza	1–1	Catanzaro
Ternana	1–1	Catania

=== Third round ===
If tied, higher-placed team advances.

Team 1	Score	Team 2
Renate	1–2	Novara
Juventus U23	2–0	Padova
Carpi	2–2	Alessandria
Monopoli	0–1	Ternana
Potenza	1–0	Triestina

=== Fourth round ===
If tied, higher-placed team advances.

Team 1	Score	Team 2
Carrarese	2–2	Juventus U23
Reggio Audace	0–0	Potenza
Carpi	1–2	Novara
Bari	1–1	Ternana

=== Final four ===
If tied after regular time, winner is decided by extra-time and eventually penalty shoot-out.

Semifinals
Reggio Emilia, 17 July 2020
Reggio Audace	2
Novara	1
Bari, 17 July 2020
Bari (a.e.t.)	2
Carrarese	1

Final
Reggio Emilia, 22 July 2020
Reggio Audace	1
Bari	0

Reggio Audace promoted to Serie B.

== Relegation play-outs ==
Higher-placed team plays at home for second leg. If tied on aggregate, lower-placed team is relegated.

Team 1	Agg.	Team 2	1st leg	2nd leg
Pianese	3–3	Pergolettese	0–0	3–3
Olbia	2–1	Giana Erminio	1–0	1–1
Fano	3–0	Ravenna	2–0	1–0
Arzignano	1–2	Imolese	1–2	0–0
Rende	1–3	Picerno	1–0	0–3
Bisceglie	0–2	Sicula Leonzio	0–1	0–1

== Top goalscorers ==
As of 22 July 2020

Rank	Player	Club	Goals
1	(Italy) Mirco Antenucci^{1}	Bari	21
2	(Italy) Giuseppe Fella	Monopoli	17
2	(Italy) Saveriano Infantino^{1}	Carrarese	17
4	(Italy) Tommaso Biasci^{2}	Carpi	16
5	(Italy) Simone Corazza	Reggina	14
6	(Italy) Daniele Paponi	Piacenza	13
7	(Argentina) Germán Denis	Reggina	12
7	(Italy) Umberto Eusepi^{3}	Alessandria	12
9	(Italy) Aniello Cutolo	Arezzo	11
9	(Italy) Francesco Galuppini	Renate	11
9	(Sierra Leone) Augustus Kargbo^{2}	Reggio Audace	11
9	(Argentina) Facundo Lescano	Sicula Leonzio	11
9	(Italy) Leonardo Pérez	Virtus Francavilla	11
9	(Argentina) Federico Vázquez^{1}	Virtus Francavilla	11
9	(Italy) Emanuele Santaniello	Picerno	11
9	(Italy) Simone Simeri^{1}	Bari	11

Note

^{1}Player scored 1 goal in the play-offs.
^{2}Player scored 2 goals in the play-offs.
^{3}Player scored 3 goals in the play-offs.
