= Antonio Zaccariello =

Italian footballer (born 1999)

Personal information
- Date of birth: 28 March 1999 (age 27)
- Place of birth: Italy
- Position: Midfielder

Team information
- Current team: RG Ticino

Youth career
- –2017: Reggio Audace (Note: Reggiana changed its name to Reggio Audace in 2018.)

Senior career*
| Years | Team | Apps | (Gls) |
| 2017–2019 | Reggio Audace | 8 | (0) |
| 2018–2019 | → Fiorenzuola (loan) | 18 | (0) |
| 2019–2022 | Fiorenzuola | 55 | (3) |
| 2022 | Desenzano Calvina | 11 | (1) |
| 2022–2023 | Brusaporto | 32 | (1) |
| 2023– | RG Ticino | 10 | (0) |
- * Club domestic league appearances and goals as of 20 December 2023

Antonio Zaccariello (born 28 March 1999) is an Italian professional footballer who plays as a midfielder for Serie D club RG Ticino.

== Club career ==
In December 2018, Zaccariello joined to Fiorenzuola on loan. He renewed his contract on 26 August 2021. On 31 January 2022, the contract between Zaccariello and Fiorenzuola was terminated by mutual consent.

On 2 February 2022, Zaccariello signed with Serie D club Desenzano Calvina.
