= Inter Milan league record by opponent =

== Overall ==
Only official matches included (Serie A, Italian Cup, Italian Super Cup, UEFA Champions League & UEFA Cup) matches

| Team | Matches | Wins | Wins % | Draws | Draws % | Losses | Losses % | For | Against | For & Against Ratio |
|---|---|---|---|---|---|---|---|---|---|---|
| Atalanta | 113 | 65 | 57.5% | 26 | 23% | 22 | 19.5% | 201 | 99 | 2.03 |
| Bari | 64 | 34 | 53.1% | 15 | 23.5% | 15 | 23.4% | 123 | 63 | 1.95 |
| Bologna | 162 | 78 | 48.1% | 37 | 22.9% | 47 | 29% | 248 | 191 | 1.3 |
| Brescia | 68 | 41 | 60.29% | 20 | 29.42% | 7 | 10.29% | 150 | 51 | 2.94 |
| Cagliari | 72 | 35 | 48.6% | 25 | 34.7% | 12 | 16.7% | 126 | 71 | 1.77 |
| Catania | 30 | 22 | 73.4% | 4 | 13.3% | 4 | 13.3% | 71 | 25 | 2.88 |
| Chievo | 16 | 9 | 56.25% | 5 | 31.25% | 2 | 12.5% | 30 | 20 | 1.5 |
| Fiorentina | 157 | 62 | 39.5% | 52 | 33.1% | 43 | 27.4% | 235 | 194 | 1.21 |
| Fiorenzuola | 1 | 1 | 100% | 0 | 0% | 0 | 0% | 2 | 1 | 2 |
| Genoa | 121 | 54 | 44.6% | 32 | 26.5% | 35 | 28.9% | 202 | 161 | 1.25 |
| Juventus | 212 | 67 | 31.6% | 53 | 25% | 92 | 43.4% | 266 | 302 | 0.88 |
| Lazio | 154 | 63 | 40.9% | 56 | 36.4% | 35 | 22.7% | 243 | 165 | 1.47 |
| Lecce | 30 | 22 | 73.3% | 5 | 16.7% | 3 | 10% | 69 | 17 | 4.05 |
| Livorno | 41 | 23 | 56.1% | 10 | 24.4% | 8 | 19.5% | 81 | 45 | 1.8 |
| Milan | 202 | 71 | 35.3% | 61 | 30.4% | 70 | 34.3% | 278 | 271 | 1.03 |
| Napoli | 141 | 68 | 48.2% | 34 | 24.1% | 39 | 27.7% | 221 | 149 | 1.48 |
| Palermo | 49 | 26 | 53.1% | 18 | 36.7% | 5 | 10.2% | 98 | 44 | 2.22 |
| Parma | 49 | 20 | 40.8% | 15 | 30.6% | 14 | 28.6% | 66 | 60 | 1.1 |
| Reggina | 23 | 17 | 73.9% | 6 | 21.8% | 1 | 4.3% | 54 | 10 | 5.4 |
| Roma | 182 | 82 | 45.1% | 48 | 26.3% | 52 | 28.6% | 295 | 233 | 1.27 |
| Sampdoria | 121 | 61 | 50.4% | 40 | 33.1% | 20 | 16.5% | 205 | 110 | 1.87 |
| Siena | 14 | 10 | 71.4% | 4 | 28.6% | 0 | 0% | 29 | 12 | 2.4 |
| Torino | 177 | 73 | 41.2% | 51 | 28.9% | 53 | 29.9% | 259 | 208 | 1.25 |
| Udinese | 88 | 43 | 48.9% | 29 | 32.9% | 16 | 18.2% | 140 | 87 | 1.6 |
| INTER | 2289 | 1048 | 45.8% | 648 | 28.3% | 593 | 25.9% | 3696 | 2592 | 1.4 |

* Updated after Milan match on 14 November 2010

== Atalanta B.C. ==
Most goals in a match

* More than 7 goals in single match

- 9 goals on 25 March 1990 Inter 7-2 Atalanta
- 7 goals on 31 May 2009 Inter 4-3 Atalanta

Atalanta B.C. biggest wins

* Two or more goals difference, OR Atalanta scored three or above

- Inter 0-3 Atalanta on 22 February 1948
- Atalanta 3-1 Inter on 15 October 1967
- Inter 1-3 Atalanta on 12 January 1986
- Atalanta 3-1 Inter on 18 January 2009

F.C. Internazionale Milano biggest wins

* Four or more goals difference, OR Inter scored five or above

- Atalanta 2-5 Ambrosiana Inter on 31 January 1943
- Inter 4-0 Atalanta on 8 May 1949
- Inter 4-0 Atalanta on 23 September 1951
- Atalanta 1-5 Inter on 25 September 1960
- Inter 6-0 Atalanta on 27 August 1961
- Atalanta 0-5 Inter on 2 October 1966
- Atalanta 0-4 Inter on 20 April 1969
- Inter 7-2 Atalanta on 25 March 1990
- Inter 4-0 Atalanta on 14 March 1998
- Inter 4-3 Atalanta on 31 May 2009

The following table lists the history of meetings between Inter and Atalanta, updated to the most recent match of 24 April 2010.

| | Matches | Wins | Draw | Losses | For | Against |
| Serie A | 102 | 58 | 24 | 20 | 182 | 93 |
| Italian Cup | 9 | 6 | 1 | 2 | 17 | 6 |
| UEFA Cup | 2 | 1 | 1 | 0 | 2 | 0 |
| Total | 113 | 65 | 26 | 22 | 201 | 99 |

== A.S. Bari ==
The following table lists the history of meetings between Inter and Bari, updated to the most recent match of 22 September 2010.

| | Matches | Wins | Draw | Losses | For | Against |
| Serie A | 61 | 33 | 16 | 12 | 119 | 60 |
| Italian Cup | 4 | 1 | 0 | 3 | 6 | 5 |
| Total | 65 | 34 | 16 | 15 | 125 | 65 |

== Bologna F.C. 1909 ==
The following table lists the history of meetings between Inter and Bologna, updated to the most recent match of 30 August 2010.

| | Matches | Wins | Draw | Losses | For | Against |
| Serie A | 144 | 66 | 34 | 43 | 216 | 174 |
| Italian Cup | 18 | 11 | 3 | 4 | 32 | 17 |
| Total | 162 | 78 | 37 | 47 | 248 | 191 |

== Cagliari Calcio ==
The following table lists the history of meetings between Inter and Cagliari, updated to the most recent match of 17 October 2010.

| | Matches | Wins | Draw | Losses | For | Against |
| Serie A | 63 | 30 | 23 | 10 | 103 | 57 |
| Italian Cup | 7 | 4 | 2 | 1 | 18 | 11 |
| UEFA Cup | 2 | 1 | 0 | 1 | 5 | 3 |
| Total | 72 | 35 | 25 | 12 | 126 | 71 |

== Brescia Calcio ==
The following table lists the history of meetings between Inter and Brescia, updated to the most recent match of 6 November 2010 .

| | Matches | Wins | Draw | Losses | For | Against |
| Serie A | 61 | 37 | 18 | 6 | 129 | 42 |
| Italian Cup | 7 | 4 | 2 | 1 | 21 | 9 |
| Total | 68 | 41 | 20 | 7 | 150 | 51 |

== Calcio Catania ==
The following table lists the history of meetings between Inter and Catania, updated to the most recent match of 12 March 2010.

| | Matches | Wins | Draw | Losses | For | Against |
| Serie A | 26 | 19 | 3 | 4 | 59 | 23 |
| Italian Cup | 4 | 3 | 1 | 0 | 12 | 2 |
| Total | 30 | 22 | 4 | 4 | 71 | 25 |

== A.C. ChievoVerona ==
The following table lists the history of meetings between Inter and Chievo, updated to the most recent match of 9 May 2010.

| | Matches | Wins | Draw | Losses | For | Against |
| Serie A | 16 | 9 | 5 | 2 | 30 | 20 |
| Total | 16 | 9 | 5 | 2 | 30 | 20 |

== ACF Fiorentina ==
The following table lists the history of meetings between Inter and Fiorentina, updated to the most recent match of 13 April 2010.

| | Matches | Wins | Draw | Losses | For | Against |
| Serie A | 146 | 59 | 49 | 38 | 222 | 178 |
| Italian Cup | 11 | 3 | 3 | 5 | 13 | 16 |
| Total | 157 | 62 | 52 | 43 | 235 | 194 |

== U.S. Fiorenzuola 1922 ==
The following table lists the history of meetings between Inter and Fiorenzuola, updated to the most recent match of 25 October 1995.

| | Matches | Wins | Draw | Losses | For | Against |
| Italian Cup | 1 | 1 | 0 | 0 | 2 | 1 |
| Total | 1 | 1 | 0 | 0 | 2 | 1 |

== Genoa C.F.C. ==
The following table lists the history of meetings between Inter and Genoa, updated to the most recent match of 29 October 2010.

| | Matches | Wins | Draw | Losses | For | Against |
| Serie A | 116 | 49 | 32 | 35 | 187 | 157 |
| Italian Cup | 6 | 6 | 0 | 0 | 16 | 4 |
| Total | 122 | 55 | 32 | 35 | 203 | 161 |

== Juventus F.C. ==
Most goals in a match

* More than 7 goals in single match

- 10 goals on 10 June 1961 Juventus 9-1 Inter
- 9 goals on 14 December 1913 Juventus 7-2 Inter
- 8 goals on 17 January 1932 Juventus 6-2 Ambrosiana Inter
- 8 goals on 19 June 1975 Inter 2-6 Juventus in Coppa Italia
- 7 goals on 26 November 1911 Inter 6-1 Juventus
- 7 goals on 4 January 1913 Inter 6-1 Juventus

F.C. Internazionale Milano biggest wins

* Four or more goals difference, OR Inter scored five or above

- Inter 6-1 Juventus on 26 November 1911
- Inter 6-1 Juventus on 4 January 1913
- Ambrosiana Inter 4-0 Juventus on 17 November 1935
- Ambrosiana Inter 5-0 Juventus on 16 October 1938
- Ambrosiana Inter 4-0 Juventus on 17 September 1939
- Inter 6-0 Juventus on 4 April 1954
- Inter 4-0 Juventus on 11 November 1979
- Inter 4-0 Juventus on 11 November 1984

Juventus F.C. biggest wins

* Four or more goals difference, OR Juventus scored five or above

- Juventus 7-2 Inter on 14 December 1913
- Juventus 6-2 Ambrosiana Inter on 17 January 1932
- Juventus 4-0 Ambrosiana Inter on 17 May 1942
- Juventus 5-1 Inter on 3 March 1957
- Juventus 9-1 Inter on 10 June 1961
- Inter 2-6 Juventus on 19 June 1975 in Coppa Italia

The following table lists the history of meetings between Inter and Juventus, updated to the most recent match of 3 October 2010.

| | Matches | Wins | Draw | Losses | For | Against |
| Serie A | 182 | 56 | 46 | 80 | 230 | 259 |
| Italian Cup | 29 | 10 | 7 | 12 | 35 | 43 |
| Italian Supercup | 1 | 1 | 0 | 0 | 1 | 0 |
| Total | 212 | 67 | 53 | 92 | 266 | 302 |

== S.S. Lazio ==
Most goals in a match

* More than 7 goals in single match

- 9 goals on 18 March 1934 Inter 8-1 Lazio
- 8 goals on 18 October 1998 Inter 3-5 Lazio
- 7 goals on 22 September 1957 Inter 5-2 Lazio
- 7 goals on 5 March 1961 Inter 7-0 Lazio
- 7 goals on 8 September 2000 Inter 3-4 Lazio in Supercoppa Italiana
- 7 goals on 13 May 2007 Inter 4-3 Lazio

SS Lazio biggest wins

* Three or more goals difference, OR Lazio scored four or above

- Lazio 4-2 Ambrosiana Inter on 2 June 1935
- Lazio 4-1 Inter on 14 May 1995
- Lazio 3-0 Inter on 22 February 1998
- Inter 3-5 Lazio on 18 October 1998
- Lazio 4-3 Inter on 8 September 2000 in Supercoppa Italiana
- Lazio 4-2 Inter on 5 May 2002

F.C. Internazionale Milano biggest wins

* Four or more goals difference, OR Inter scored five or above

- Ambrosiana Inter 8-1 Lazio on 18 March 1934
- Ambrosiana Inter 4-0 Lazio on 19 May 1940
- Inter 5-2 Lazio on 22 September 1957
- Inter 4-0 Lazio on 7 June 1959
- Inter 7-0 Lazio on 5 March 1961
- Inter 4-0 Lazio on 19 November 1978
- Inter 5-2 Lazio on 27 January 1999 in Coppa Italia

The following table lists the history of meetings between Inter and Lazio, updated to the most recent match of 2 May 2010.

| | Matches | Wins | Draw | Losses | For | Against |
| Serie A | 136 | 56 | 51 | 29 | 218 | 146 |
| Italian Cup | 15 | 6 | 5 | 4 | 18 | 3 |
| Italian Supercup | 2 | 0 | 0 | 2 | 4 | 6 |
| UEFA Cup | 1 | 1 | 0 | 0 | 3 | 0 |
| Total | 154 | 63 | 56 | 35 | 243 | 165 |

== U.S. Lecce ==
Most goals in a match

* More than 6 goals in single match

- 6 goals on 27 September 1997 Lecce 1-5 Inter
- 6 goals on 21 November 1999 Inter 6-0 Lecce

U.S. Lecce biggest wins

- Lecce 1-0 Inter on 26 March 2000
- Inter 1-0 Lecce on 11 December 2000
- Lecce 2-1 Inter on 2 May 2004

F.C. Internazionale Milano biggest wins

* Four or more goals difference, OR Inter scored five or above

- Inter 5-0 Lecce on 20 January 1991
- Lecce 1-5 Inter on 27 September 1997
- Inter 5-0 Lecce on 15 February 1998
- Inter 6-0 Lecce on 21 November 1999

The following table lists the history of meetings between Inter and Lecce, updated to the most recent match of 10 November 2010.

| | Matches | Wins | Draw | Losses | For | Against |
| Serie A | 27 | 21 | 3 | 3 | 65 | 15 |
| Italian Cup | 4 | 1 | 3 | 0 | 5 | 3 |
| Total | 31 | 22 | 6 | 3 | 70 | 18 |

== A.S. Livorno Calcio ==
Most goals in a match

* More than 7 goals in single match

- 8 goals on 23 February 1930 Inter 6-2 Livorno
- 6 goals on 24 February 1935 Inter 5-1 Livorno
- 6 goals on 7 March 1943 Livorno 4-2 Ambrosiana Inter

A.S. Livorno Calcio biggest wins

* Three or more goals difference, OR Livorno scored four or above

- Livorno 3-0 Inter on 2 March 1923
- Livorno 3-0 Ambrosiana Inter on 29 March 1942
- Livorno 4-2 Ambrosiana Inter on 7 March 1943

F.C. Internazionale Milano biggest wins

* Four or more goals difference, OR Inter scored five or above

- Inter 4-0 Livorno on 18 November 1923
- Ambrosiana Inter 6-2 Livorno on 23 February 1930
- Ambrosiana Inter 5-1 Livorno on 24 February 1935
- Inter 5-0 Livorno on 16 October 2005

The following table lists the history of meetings between Inter and Livorno, updated to the most recent match of 24 March 2010.

| | Matches | Wins | Draw | Losses | For | Against |
| Serie A | 39 | 21 | 10 | 8 | 79 | 45 |
| Italian Cup | 2 | 2 | 0 | 0 | 2 | 0 |
| Total | 41 | 23 | 10 | 8 | 81 | 45 |

== A.C. Milan ==
Most goals in a match

* More than 7 goals in single match

- 11 goals on 6 November 1949 Inter 6-5 Milan
- 9 goals on 3 April 1910 Inter 3-6 Milan
- 9 goals on 6 November 1932 Inter 5-4 Milan
- 8 goals on 6 February 1949 Inter 4-4 Milan
- 8 goals on 27 March 1960 Milan 5-3 Inter
- 7 goals on 22 February 1914 Inter 5-2 Milan
- 7 goals on 28 March 1965 Inter 5-2 Milan
- 7 goals on 28 October 2006 Milan 3-4 Inter

AC Milan biggest wins

* Four or more goals difference, OR Milan scored five or above

- Inter 3-6 Milan on 3 April 1910
- Milan 5-3 Inter on 27 March 1960
- Milan 8-0 Inter on 8 January 1998 in Coppa Italia
- Inter 0-6 Milan on 11 May 2001

F.C. Internazionale Milano biggest wins

* Four or more goals difference, OR Inter scored five or above

- Milan 0-5 Inter on 6 February 1910
- Inter 5-1 Milan on 17 February 1910
- Inter 5-2 Milan on 22 February 1914
- Ambrosiana Inter 5-4 Milan on 6 November 1932
- Inter 6-5 Milan on 6 November 1949
- Inter 5-2 Milan on 28 March 1965
- Inter 4-0 Milan on 2 April 1967
- Milan 1-5 Inter on 24 March 1974
- Milan 0-4 Inter on 29 August 2009

The following table lists the history of meetings between Inter and Milan, updated to the most recent derby of 14 November 2010.

| | Matches | Wins | Draws | Losses | For | Against |
| Serie A | 174 | 64 | 52 | 59 | 255 | 236 |
| Italian Cup | 23 | 7 | 7 | 9 | 22 | 32 |
| Champions League | 4 | 0 | 2 | 2 | 1 | 4 |
| Totals | 202 | 70 | 61 | 70 | 278 | 272 |

== S.S.C. Napoli ==
Most goals in a match

* More than 6 goals in single match

- 11 goals on 19 December 1926 Inter 9-2 Napoli
- 9 goals on 20 January 1929 Ambrosiana Inter 8-1 Napoli
- 8 goals on 29 June 1933 Ambrosiana Inter 3-5 Napoli
- 7 goals on 11 October 1931 Ambrosiana Inter 6-1 Napoli
- 7 goals on 8 October 1950 Inter 4-3 Napoli
- 7 goals on 10 February 1980 Napoli 3-4 Inter

S.S.C. Napoli biggest wins

* Three or more goals difference OR Napoli scored than four goals

- Ambrosiana Inter 3-5 Napoli on 29 June 1933

F.C. Internazionale Milano biggest wins

* Four or more goals difference, OR Inter scored five or above

- Inter 9-2 Napoli on 19 December 1926
- Ambrosiana Inter 8-1 Napoli on 20 January 1929
- Ambrosiana Inter 6-1 Napoli on 11 October 1931
- Ambrosiana Inter 5-1 Napoli on 21 December 1941
- Inter 5-1 Napoli on 5 October 1952
- Napoli 1-5 Inter 17 February 1963
- Inter 4-0 Napoli on 11 February 1996

The following table lists the history of meetings between Inter and Napoli, updated to the most recent match of 14 February 2010.

| | Matches | Wins | Draw | Losses | For | Against |
| Serie A | 134 | 64 | 31 | 39 | 210 | 143 |
| Italian Cup | 7 | 4 | 3 | 0 | 11 | 6 |
| Total | 141 | 68 | 34 | 39 | 221 | 149 |

== U.S. Città di Palermo ==
Most goals in a match

* More than 7 goals in single match

- 8 goals on 29 October 2009 Inter 5-3 Palermo

U.S. Città di Palermo biggest wins

* Two or more goals difference, OR Palermo scored three or above

- Palermo 4-2 Inter on 20 November 1949
- Palermo 3-2 Inter on 10 September 2005

F.C. Internazionale Milano biggest wins

* Four or more goals difference, OR Inter scored five or above

- Ambrosiana Inter 5-1 Palermo on 8 January 1933
- Ambrosiana Inter 4-0 Palermo on 13 October 1935
- Inter 5-0 Palermo on 10 February 1952
- Inter 4-0 Palermo on 3 January 1954
- Inter 4-0 Palermo on 10 February 1963

The following table lists the history of meetings between Inter and Palermo, updated to the most recent match of 19 September 2010.

| | Matches | Wins | Draw | Losses | For | Against |
| Serie A | 46 | 25 | 18 | 4 | 96 | 41 |
| Italian Cup | 2 | 1 | 0 | 1 | 2 | 2 |
| Total | 49 | 26 | 18 | 5 | 98 | 43 |

== Parma F.C. ==
Most goals in a match

* More than 6 goals in single match

- 7 goals on 29 November 2000 Parma 6-1 Inter in Coppa Italia
- 6 goals on 19 September 1999 Inter 5-1 Parma

Parma F.C. biggest wins

* Three or more goals difference OR Parma scored than four goals

- Parma 6-1 Inter on 29 November 2000 in Coppa Italia

F.C. Internazionale Milano biggest wins

* Four or more goals difference, OR Inter scored five or above

- Inter 5-1 Parma on 19 September 1999

The following table lists the history of meetings between Inter and Parma, updated to the most recent match of 10 February 2010 .

| | Matches | Wins | Draw | Losses | For | Against |
| Serie A | 38 | 15 | 12 | 11 | 51 | 45 |
| Italian Cup | 10 | 4 | 3 | 3 | 12 | 14 |
| UEFA Cup Playoff | 1 | 1 | 0 | 0 | 3 | 1 |
| Total | 49 | 20 | 15 | 14 | 66 | 60 |

== Reggina Calcio ==
Most goals in a match

* More than 6 goals in single match

- 6 goals on 29 August 1971 Inter 6-0 Reggina in Coppa Italia
- 6 goals on 22 November 2003 Inter 6-0 Reggina

Reggina Calcio biggest wins

- Reggina 2-1 Inter on 1 October 2000

F.C. Internazionale Milano biggest wins

* Four or more goals difference, OR Inter scored five or above

- Inter 6-0 Reggina on 29 August 1971 in Coppa Italia
- Inter 6-0 Reggina on 22 November 2003
- Reggina 0-4 Inter on 18 December 2005
- Inter 4-0 Reggina on 22 April 2006

The following table lists the history of meetings between Inter and Reggina, updated to the most recent match of 22 March 2009.

| | Matches | Wins | Draw | Losses | For | Against |
| Serie A | 18 | 12 | 5 | 1 | 35 | 7 |
| Italian Cup | 6 | 5 | 1 | 0 | 19 | 3 |
| Total | 24 | 17 | 6 | 1 | 54 | 10 |

== A.S.Roma ==
Most goals in a match

* More than 7 goals in single match

- 9 goals on 2 May 1999 Roma 4-5 Inter
- 8 goals on 21 January 1968 Roma 2-6 Inter
- 8 goals on 9 May 2007 Roma 6-2 Inter Coppa Italia
- 7 goals on 7 April 1935 Roma 3-4 Ambrosiana Inter
- 7 goals on 12 May 1985 Roma 4-3 Inter
- 7 goals on 26 August 2006 Inter 4-3 Roma in Supercoppa Italiana

AS Roma biggest wins

* Four or more goals difference, OR Roma scored five or above

- Roma 6-0 Ambrosiana Inter on 31 May 1942
- Roma 6-2 Inter on 9 May 2007 in Coppa Italia

F.C. Internazionale Milano biggest wins

* Four or more goals difference, OR Inter scored five or above

- Ambrosiana Inter 6-0 Roma on 27 April 1930
- Ambrosiana Inter 5-0 Roma on 31 May 1931
- Ambrosiana Inter 5-1 Roma on 23 February 1936
- Ambrosiana Inter 5-1 Roma on 5 January 1941
- Inter 6-0 Roma on 22 October 1950
- Roma 2-6 Inter on 21 January 1968
- Roma 4-5 Inter on 2 May 1999

The following table lists the history of meetings between Inter and Roma, updated to the most recent match of 25 September 2010.

| | Matches | Wins | Draw | Losses | For | Against |
| Serie A | 156 | 69 | 45 | 45 | 257 | 201 |
| Italian Cup | 17 | 10 | 2 | 5 | 27 | 24 |
| Italian Supercup | 4 | 2 | 1 | 1 | 9 | 7 |
| UEFA Cup | 2 | 1 | 0 | 1 | 2 | 1 |
| Total | 182 | 82 | 48 | 52 | 295 | 233 |

== U.C. Sampdoria ==
Most goals in a match

* More than 7 goals in single match

- 8 goals on 25 March 1956 Inter 7-1 Sampdoria
- 8 goals on 9 January 1972 Inter 4-4 Sampdoria
- 7 goals on 16 June 1957 Inter 6-1 Sampdoria
- 7 goals on 15 December 1996 Inter 3-4 Sampdoria

U.C. Sampdoria biggest wins

* Four or more goals difference, OR Sampdoria scored five or above

- Sampdoria 4-0 Inter on 22 September 1991
- Sampdoria 4-0 Inter on 21 March 1999

F.C. Internazionale Milano biggest wins

* Four or more goals difference, OR Inter scored five or above

- Sampdoria 1-5 Inter on 6 July 1947
- Sampdoria 0-4 Inter on 9 January 1949
- Inter 5-1 Sampdoria on 5 November 1950
- Sampdoria 0-4 Inter on 18 March 1951
- Inter 7-1 Sampdoria on 25 March 1956
- Inter 6-1 Sampdoria on 16 June 1957
- Inter 5-1 Sampdoria on 23 November 1958
- Inter 4-0 Sampdoria on 18 November 1962
- Sampdoria 1-5 Inter on 1 March 1964
- Sampdoria 0-5 Inter on 19 December 1965
- Sampdoria 0-5 Inter on 26 April 1970
- Sampdoria 0-4 Inter on 13 April 2014

The following table lists the history of meetings between Inter and Sampdoria, updated to the most recent match of 24 October 2010.

| | Matches | Wins | Draw | Losses | For | Against |
| Serie A | 109 | 57 | 35 | 17 | 194 | 102 |
| Italian Cup | 11 | 3 | 5 | 3 | 9 | 8 |
| Italian Supercup | 1 | 1 | 0 | 0 | 2 | o |
| Total | 121 | 61 | 40 | 20 | 205 | 110 |

== A.C. Siena ==
Most goals in a match

* More than 6 goals in single match

- 7 goals on 9 January 2010 Inter 4-3 Siena

A.C. Siena biggest wins

* one or more goals difference

- None

F.C. Internazionale Milano biggest wins

* Four or more goals difference, OR Inter scored five or above

- Inter 4-0 Siena on 1 February 2004

The following table lists the history of meetings between Inter and Siena, updated to the most recent match of 16 May 2010.

| | Matches | Wins | Draw | Losses | For | Against |
| Serie A | 14 | 10 | 4 | 0 | 29 | 12 |
| Total | 14 | 10 | 4 | 0 | 29 | 12 |

== Torino F.C. ==
Most goals in a match

* More than 7 goals in single match

- 12 goals on 7 March 1920 Torino 6-6 Inter
- 10 goals on 12 January 1941 Torino 5-5 Ambrosiana Inter
- 9 goals on 10 April 1910 Inter 7-2 Torino
- 8 goals on 14 July 1946 Inter 6-2 Torino
- 7 goals on 29 March 1925 Inter 2-5 Torino
- 7 goals on 16 May 1926 Inter 3-4 Torino
- 7 goals on 30 March 1947 Torino 5-2 Inter

Torino F.C. biggest wins

* Four or more goals difference, OR Torino scored five or above

- Torino 6-0 Inter on 12 November 1921
- Torino 6-0 Ambrosiana Inter on 19 October 1930
- Torino 5-2 Inter on 30 March 1947

F.C. Internazionale Milano biggest wins

* Four or more goals difference, OR Inter scored five or above

- Inter 7-2 Torino on 10 April 1910
- Ambrosiana Inter 5-1 Torino on 16 April 1933
- Ambrosiana Inter 4-0 Torino on 26 May 1935
- Ambrosiana Inter 4-0 Torino on 26 April 1936
- Ambrosiana Inter 5-1 Torino on 24 March 1940
- Inter 6-2 Torino on 14 July 1946
- Torino 0-5 Inter on 28 December 1958
- Inter 4-0 Torino on 17 October 1965
- Inter 4-0 Torino on 1 October 1995
- Inter 4-0 Torino on 9 December 2007

The following table lists the history of meetings between Inter and Torino, updated to the most recent match of 1 February 2009.

| | Matches | Wins | Draw | Losses | For | Against |
| Serie A | 162 | 68 | 49 | 45 | 246 | 191 |
| Italian Cup | 15 | 5 | 2 | 8 | 13 | 17 |
| Total | 177 | 73 | 51 | 53 | 259 | 208 |

== Udinese Calcio ==
Most goals in a match

* More than 7 goals in single match

- 7 goals on 21 March 1951 Inter 6-1 Udinese
- 7 goals on 29 April 1990 Udinese 4-3 Inter

Udinese Calcio biggest wins

* Three or more goals difference, OR Udinese scored four or above

- Udinese 4-3 Inter on 29 April 1990
- Udinese 3-0 Inter on 9 April 2000
- Udinese 3-0 Inter on 21 October 2000

F.C. Internazionale Milano biggest wins

* Four or more goals difference, OR Inter scored five or above

- Inter 6-1 Udinese on 21 March 1951
- Inter 5-0 Udinese on 1 February 1959
- Udinese 0-6 Inter on 9 October 1960

The following table lists the history of meetings between Inter and Udinese, updated to the most recent match of 11 September 2010.

| | Matches | Wins | Draw | Losses | For | Against |
| Serie A | 77 | 38 | 24 | 15 | 124 | 76 |
| Italian Cup | 11 | 5 | 5 | 1 | 16 | 11 |
| Total | 88 | 43 | 29 | 16 | 140 | 87 |

INTER Archivio
