= 2020–21 Reggina 1914 season =

Reggina
2020–21 season
- President: Luca Gallo
- Manager: Domenico Toscano (until 14 December); Marco Baroni (from 15 December)
- Stadium: Stadio Oreste Granillo
- Serie B: 14th
- Coppa Italia: Third round
- Top goalscorer: Michael Folorunsho (6)
- All statistics correct as of 21 March 2021.

The 2020-21 season will be Reggina 1914's 106th season in existence. After five seasons in the third tier of Italian football, Reggina return to Serie B. They will also participate in this season's Coppa Italia.

== First-team squad ==
As of 1 February 2021

| Squad no. | Name | Nationality | Position(s) | Date of birth | Signed from | Apps | Goals |
Goalkeepers
| 1 | Enrico Guarna | (Italy) | GK | 11 August 1985 (age 41) | (Italy) Monza | 29 | 0 |
| 12 | Alessandro Plizzari | (Italy) | GK | 12 March 2000 (age 26) | (Italy) Milan | 0 | 0 |
| 88 | Nícolas | (Brazil) | GK | 12 May 1988 (age 38) | (Italy) Udinese | 0 | 0 |
Defenders
| 3 | Thiago Cionek | (Poland) | CB | 21 May 1986 (age 40) | (Italy) S.P.A.L. | 0 | 0 |
| 4 | Dimitrios Stavropoulos | (Greece) | CB | 1 May 1997 (age 29) | (Greece) Panionios | 0 | 0 |
| 6 | Giuseppe Loiacono | (Italy) | CB | 6 October 1991 (age 35) | (Italy) Foggia | 29 | 2 |
| 13 | Marco Rossi | (Italy) | CB | 30 September 1987 (age 39) | (Italy) Siena | 31 | 0 |
| 17 | Gianluca Di Chiara | (Italy) | LB | 26 December 1993 (age 32) | (Italy) Perugia | 0 | 0 |
| 24 | Enrico Del Prato | (Italy) | RB/DM | 10 November 1999 (age 27) | (Italy) Atalanta | 0 | 0 |
| 31 | Daniele Gasparetto | (Italy) | CB | 6 April 1988 (age 38) | (Italy) Ternana | 27 | 0 |
| 32 | Christian Dalle Mura | (Italy) | CB | 2 February 2002 (age 24) | (Italy) Fiorentina | 0 | 0 |
| 33 | Ivan Lakićević | (Serbia) | RB | 27 July 1993 (age 33) | (Italy) Genoa | 0 | 0 |
| 94 | Daniele Liotti | (Italy) | LB/LM | 8 June 1994 (age 32) | (Italy) Pisa | 10 | 1 |
Midfielders
| 2 | Kingsley Michael | (Nigeria) | CM | 26 August 1999 (age 27) | (Italy) Bologna | 0 | 0 |
| 8 | Lorenzo Crisetig | (Italy) | DM/CM | 20 January 1993 (age 33) | Unattached | 0 | 0 |
| 14 | Gabriele Rolando | (Italy) | LM/RM | 2 April 1995 (age 31) | (Italy) Sampdoria | 24 | 1 |
| 15 | Nicolò Bianchi | (Italy) | CM | 24 February 1992 (age 34) | (Italy) Vicenza | 30 | 1 |
| 25 | Marco Crimi | (Italy) | DM | 17 March 1990 (age 36) | (Italy) Virtus Entella | 0 | 0 |
| 26 | Luca Chierico | (Italy) | DM/CM | 26 September 2001 (age 25) | (Italy) Genoa | 0 | 0 |
| 90 | Michael Folorunsho | (Italy) | AM/CM | 7 February 1998 (age 28) | (Italy) Napoli | 0 | 0 |
| 91 | Ricardo Faty | (Senegal) | DM | 4 August 1986 (age 40) | (Turkey) Ankaragücü | 0 | 0 |
| 92 | Mario Šitum | (Croatia) | RM/RW | 4 April 1992 (age 34) | (Turkey) Kayserispor | 0 | 0 |
| 99 | Rigoberto Rivas | (Honduras) | AM/CF/RW | 31 July 1998 (age 28) | (Italy) Inter | 16 | 2 |
Forwards
| 7 | Jérémy Ménez | (France) | CF/RW | 7 May 1987 (age 39) | Unattached | 0 | 0 |
| 9 | Orji Okwonkwo | (Nigeria) | RW/LW/CF | 19 January 1998 (age 28) | (Italy) Bologna | 0 | 0 |
| 10 | Nicola Bellomo | (Italy) | AM/SS | 18 February 1991 (age 35) | (Italy) Salernitana | 44 | 8 |
| 11 | Elia Petrelli | (Italy) | CF | 15 August 2001 (age 25) | (Italy) Genoa | 0 | 0 |
| 19 | Germán Denis | (Argentina) | CF | 10 September 1981 (age 45) | (Peru) Universitario | 23 | 12 |
| 20 | Simone Edera | (Italy) | RW | 9 January 1997 (age 29) | (Italy) Torino | 0 | 0 |
| 21 | Nikola Vasic | (Sweden) | CF | 4 October 1991 (age 35) | (Sweden) Akropolis | 0 | 0 |
| 30 | Adriano Montalto | (Italy) | CF | 6 April 1988 (age 38) | (Italy) Bari | 0 | 0 |

== Transfers and loans ==
=== Transfers in ===
| Entry date | Position | No. | Player | From club | Fee | Ref. |
|---|---|---|---|---|---|---|
| 23 June 2020 | FW | 7 | (France) Jérémy Ménez | Unattached | Free | |
| 25 July 2020 | FW | 18 | (Northern Ireland) Kyle Lafferty | Unattached | Free | |
| 19 August 2020 | MF | 8 | (Italy) Lorenzo Crisetig | Unattached | Free | |
| 24 August 2020 | DF | 4 | (Greece) Dimitrios Stavropoulos | (Greece) Panionios | Free | |
| 16 September 2020 | MF | 91 | (Senegal) Ricardo Faty | Unnattached | Free | |
| 28 September 2020 | DF | 3 | (Poland) Thiago Cionek | (Italy) S.P.A.L. | Free | |
| 2 October 2020 | FW | | (Sweden) Nikola Vasic | (Sweden) Akropolis | Undisclosed | |
| 3 October 2020 | FW | | (Croatia) Mario Situm | (Turkey) Kayserispor | Free | |
| 5 October 2020 | MF | | (Italy) Andrea Marcucci | (Italy) Imolese | Undisclosed | |
| 14 January 2021 | GK | | (Brazil) Nícolas | (Italy) Udinese | Undisclosed | |
| 19 January 2021 | DF | 33 | (Serbia) Ivan Lakićević | (Italy) Genoa C.F.C. | Free | |
| 26 January 2021 | FW | 30 | (Italy) Adriano Montalto | (Italy) Bari | Undisclosed | |
| 29 January 2021 | MF | 25 | (Italy) Marco Crimi | (Italy) Virtus Entella | Undisclosed | |
| Total | | | | | N/A | |

=== Loans in ===
| Start date | End date | Position | No. | Player | To club | Fee | Ref. |
|---|---|---|---|---|---|---|---|
| 20 August 2020 | 6 January 2021 | MF | | (Italy) Lorenzo Peli | (Italy) Atalanta | None | |
| 21 August 2020 | 30 June 2021 | GK | | (Italy) Alessandro Plizzari | (Italy) Milan | None | |
| 11 September 2020 | 30 June 2021 | MF | | (Italy) Enrico Del Prato | (Italy) Atalanta | None | |
| 16 September 2020 | 30 June 2021 | MF | | (Italy) Michael Folorunsho | (Italy) Napoli | None | |
| 17 September 2020 | 30 June 2021 | FW | | (France) Gabriel Charpentier | (Italy) Genoa | None | |
| 23 September 2020 | 30 June 2022 | DF | | (Italy) Gianluca Di Chiara | (Italy) Perugia | None | |
| 12 January 2021 | 30 June 2021 | MF | | (Romania) Claudiu Micovschi | (Italy) Genoa | None | |
| 22 January 2021 | 30 June 2021 | DF | 32 | (Italy) Christian Dalle Mura | (Italy) Fiorentina | None | |
| 30 January 2021 | 30 June 2021 | FW | 20 | (Italy) Simone Edera | (Italy) Torino | None | |
| 31 January 2021 | 30 June 2021 | FW | 11 | (Italy) Elia Petrelli | (Italy) Genoa | None | |
| 1 February 2021 | 30 June 2021 | MF | 2 | (Nigeria) Kingsley Michael | (Italy) Bologna | None | |

=== Transfers out ===
| Exit date | Position | No. | Player | To club | Fee | Ref. |
|---|---|---|---|---|---|---|
| 27 August 2020 | MF | | (Slovenia) Urban Zibert | Mantova | Free | |
| 4 September 2020 | FW | 18 | (Italy) Simone Corazza | Alessandria | Undisclosed | |
| 15 September 2020 | FW | 36 | (Italy) Manuel Sarao | Catania | Undisclosed | |
| 17 September 2020 | FW | 23 | (Brazil) Reginaldo | Catania | Undisclosed | |
| 21 September 2020 | FW | 24 | (France) Abdou Doumbia | Carrarese | Undisclosed | |
| 22 September 2020 | DF | 9 | (Italy) Edoardo Blondett | Alessandria | Undisclosed | |
| 22 September 2020 | MF | 37 | (Denmark) Matti Lund Nielsen | Pro Vercelli | Undisclosed | |
| 28 September 2020 | MF | | (Greece) Dimitrios Sounas | Perugia | Undisclosed | |
| 30 September 2020 | DF | | (Italy) Davide Bertoncini | Como | Undisclosed | |
| 12 January 2021 | FW | | (Northern Ireland) Kyle Lafferty | Unattached | Released by mutual consent | |
| 23 January 2021 | MF | | (Italy) Francesco De Rose | Palermo | Undisclosed | |

=== Loans out ===
| Start date | End date | Position | No. | Player | To club | Fee | Ref. |
|---|---|---|---|---|---|---|---|
| 4 September 2020 | 30 June 2021 | MF | 21 | (Italy) Lorenzo Paolucci | (Italy) Monopoli | None | |
| 4 September 2020 | 30 June 2021 | DF | 33 | (Italy) Matteo Rubin | (Italy) Alessandria | None | |
| 26 September 2020 | 30 June 2021 | DF | | (Italy) Paolo Marchi | (Italy) Ravenna | None | |
| 29 September 2020 | 30 June 2021 | DF | | (Italy) Desiderio Garufo | (Italy) Catanzaro | None | |
| 14 January 2021 | 30 June 2021 | MF | | (Morocco) Hachim Mastour | (Italy) Carpi | None | |
| 21 January 2021 | 30 June 2021 | MF | | (Italy) Gabriele Rolando | (Italy) Bari | None | |
| 29 January 2021 | 30 June 2022 | MF | | (Italy) Andrea Marcucci | (Italy) Virtus Entella | None | |

== Pre-season friendlies ==
Reggina began the first part of pre-season training on July 20 at Centro sportivo Sant'Agata in Reggio Calabria. A squad of 27 players were named for the training camp.

| 12 September 2020 Friendly | Benevento (Italy) | 2–1 | (Italy) Reggina | Benevento, Italy |
| 19:00 CEST | Moncini 56'; Improta 61' | Report | Loiacono 54' | Stadium: Stadio Ciro Vigorito |

== Competitions ==
=== Overview ===
| Competition | First match | Last match | Starting round | Record | | | | | | | |
| Competition | First match | Last match | Starting round | Pld | W | D | L | GF | GA | GD | Win % |
|---|---|---|---|---|---|---|---|---|---|---|---|
| Serie B | 26 September 2020 | May 2021 | Matchday 1 | 30 | 9 | 10 | 11 | 29 | 34 | −5 | 30.00 |
| Coppa Italia | 30 September 2020 | 27 October 2020 | Second round | 2 | 1 | 0 | 1 | 1 | 2 | −1 | 50.00 |
| Total | | | | 32 | 10 | 10 | 12 | 30 | 36 | −6 | 31.25 |

Last updated: 21 March 2021
Source: Competitions

=== Serie B ===
==== League table ====
| Pos | Team | Pld | W | D | L | GF | GA | GD | Pts |
|---|---|---|---|---|---|---|---|---|---|
| 9 | SPAL | 38 | 14 | 14 | 10 | 44 | 42 | +2 | 56 (Note: Head-to-head points: Brescia 9, Chievo 5, SPAL 2.) |
| 10 | Frosinone | 38 | 12 | 14 | 12 | 38 | 42 | −4 | 50 (Note: Frosinone finished ahead of Reggina on head-to-head points: Frosinone 1–1 Reggina, Reggina 0–4 Frosinone.) |
| 11 | Reggina | 38 | 12 | 14 | 12 | 42 | 45 | −3 | 50 |
| 12 | Vicenza | 38 | 11 | 15 | 12 | 48 | 53 | −5 | 48 (Note: Head-to-head points: Vicenza 8, Cremonese 4, Pisa 3.) |
| 13 | Cremonese | 38 | 12 | 12 | 14 | 46 | 44 | +2 | 48 |

Source: Lega Serie B (in Italian), Soccerway (in English)
Rules for classification: 1) Points; 2) Head-to-head points; 3) Head-to-head goal difference; 4) Goal difference; 5) Goals scored; 6) Draw.

==== Results summary ====
| Overall | | | | | | | | Home | | | | | | Away | | | | | |
| Pld | W | D | L | GF | GA | GD | Pts | W | D | L | GF | GA | GD | W | D | L | GF | GA | GD |
|---|---|---|---|---|---|---|---|---|---|---|---|---|---|---|---|---|---|---|---|
| 31 | 10 | 10 | 11 | 31 | 34 | −3 | 40 | 6 | 3 | 6 | 13 | 15 | −2 | 4 | 7 | 5 | 18 | 19 | −1 |

Last updated: 21 March 2021.

==== Results by round ====
| Round | 1 | 2 | 3 | 4 | 5 | 6 | 7 | 8 | 9 | 10 | 11 | 12 | 13 | 14 | 15 | 16 | 17 | 18 | 19 | 20 | 21 | 22 | 23 | 24 | 25 | 26 | 27 | 28 | 29 | 30 | 31 | 32 | 33 | 34 | 35 | 36 | 37 | 38 |
|---|---|---|---|---|---|---|---|---|---|---|---|---|---|---|---|---|---|---|---|---|---|---|---|---|---|---|---|---|---|---|---|---|---|---|---|---|---|---|
| Ground | A | H | A | H | A | H | A | H | A | H | A | H | H | A | A | H | A | H | A | H | A | H | A | H | A | H | A | H | A | H | A | A | H | H | A | H | A | H |
| Result | D | W | D | D | D | L | L | L | L | W | L | L | L | D | W | W | L | L | D | D | W | W | D | W | W | L | D | W | L | D | W | | | | | | | |
| Position | 8 | 3 | 5 | 7 | 7 | 9 | 14 | 15 | 16 | 13 | 15 | 16 | 18 | 18 | 16 | 13 | 14 | 14 | 15 | 15 | 16 | 14 | 13 | 13 | 12 | 12 | 12 | 12 | 11 | 12 | 12 | | | | | | | |

Updated to match(es) played on 2 April 2021. Source:
A = Away; H = Home; W = Win; D = Draw; L = Loss

==== Matches ====
League fixtures were announced on 9 September 2020.

| 26 September 2020 1 | Salernitana | 1–1 | Reggina | Salerno |
| 14:00 CEST | Tutino (yellow card) 33'; Veseli (yellow card) 56'; Migliorini (yellow card) 82'; Casasola 84'; Schiavone (yellow card) 89' | Report | Loiacono (yellow card) 53'; Rossi (yellow card) 62'; Ménez 83' | Stadium: Stadio Arechi; Referee: Michael Fabbri |

| 3 October 2020 2 | Reggina | 3–1 | Pescara | Reggio Calabria |
| 16:15 CEST | Rossi (yellow card) 17'; Liotti 23', 27'; Bellomo (yellow card) 31'; Ménez 44' | Report | Galano (penalty missed) 18'; Memushaj (yellow card) 32'; Maistro 70' | Stadium: Stadio Oreste Granillo; Referee: Valerio Marini |

| 17 October 2020 3 | Virtus Entella | 1–1 | Reggina | Chiavari |
| 14:00 CEST | Brunori (yellow card) 32'; Crimi (yellow card) 45' (yellow-red card) 61'; De Col (yellow card) 76'; Mancosu 90' (pen.) | Report | Ménez (yellow card) 21'; Rossi (yellow card) 33'; Crisetig 51'; Folorunsho (yellow card) 59' | Stadium: Stadio Aldo Gastaldi; Attendance: 500; Referee: Luca Pairetto |

| 20 October 2020 4 | Reggina | 0–0 | Cosenza | Reggio Calabria |
| 15:00 CEST | Denis (penalty missed) 38'; Liotti (yellow card) 53'; Ménez (yellow card) 68'; Crisetig (yellow card) 77'; Folorunsho (yellow card) 88' | Report | Idda (yellow card) 24'; Tiritiello (yellow card) 33' (yellow-red card) 35'; Báez (yellow card) 54'; Ba (yellow card) 86' | Stadium: Stadio Oreste Granillo; Attendance: 952; Referee: Riccardo Ros |

| 24 October 2020 5 | Pordenone | 2–2 | Reggina | Pordenone |
| 14:00 CEST | Diaw 49'; Ciurria 69'; Misuraca (yellow card) 74' | Report | Liotti 13'; Bellomo (yellow card) 41'; Rolando (yellow card) 47'; Cionek (yellow card) 52'; Di Chiara (yellow card) 75'; Folorunsho 90' | Stadium: Stadio Guido Teghil; Referee: Eugenio Abbattista |

| 1 November 2020 6 | Reggina | 0–1 | S.P.A.L. | Reggio Calabria |
| 15:00 CET | Loiacono (yellow card) 12'; Ménez (red card) 23'; Bellomo (yellow card) 33'; Denis (penalty missed) 61' | Report | Castro 31' (red card) 90+2'; Valoti (yellow card) 37'; Tomović (yellow card) 60'; Esposito (yellow card) 69'; Sala (yellow card) 89' | Stadium: Stadio Oreste Granillo; Attendance: 0 Referee: Giovanni Ayroldi |

| 7 November 2020 7 | Empoli | 3–0 | Reggina | Empoli |
| 16:00 CET | Terzić (yellow card) 20'; Mancuso 46'; Matos 58'; Olivieri 81'; Cambiaso (yellow card) 88' | Report | Crisetig (yellow card) 22'; Bianchi (yellow card) 34'; Del Prato (yellow card) 37'; Folorunsho (yellow card) 47' | Stadium: Stadio Carlo Castellani; Attendance: 0 Referee: Giampaolo Calvarese |

| 22 November 2020 8 | Reggina | 1–2 | Pisa | Reggio Calabria |
| 21:00 CET | Criserig (yellow card) 19' (yellow-red card) 46'; Šitum 22'; Ménez (yellow card) 35'; Cionek (yellow card) 43'; Folorunsho (yellow card) 56'; Plizzari (yellow card) 90+1'; Rossi (yellow card) 90+1' | Report | Birindelli (yellow card) 45+1'; De Vitis (yellow card) 61'; Siega (yellow card) 74'; Masucci 86'; Sibilli 90+1', (yellow card) 90+2' | Stadium: Stadio Oreste Granillo; Attendance: 0 Referee: Piere Giacomelli |

| 28 November 2020 9 | Monza | 1–0 | Reggina | Monza |
| 16:00 CEST | Gytkjær (yellow card) 8'; Boateng (yellow card) 44', (penalty missed); Barberis (yellow card) 52'; Mota 54'; Bellusci (yellow card) 80' | Report | Folorunsho (yellow card) 45+1' (yellow-red card) 47'; Plizzari (yellow card) 56'; Del Prato (yellow card) 90+2' | Stadium: Stadio Brianteo; Attendance: 0 Referee: Ivan Robilotta |

| 5 December 2020 10 | Reggina | 2–1 | Brescia | Reggio Calabria |
| 15:30 CET | Šitum (yellow card) 1'; Crisetig (yellow card) 42', (goal) 51'; Denis 55'; Di Chiara (yellow card) 90+6' | Report | Torregrossa (yellow card) 3'; van de Looi (yellow card) 39'; Ragusa 58'; Łabojko (yellow card) 68'; Ayé (yellow card) 90+6'; Sabello (yellow card) 90+6' | Stadium: Stadio Oreste Granillo; Attendance: 0 Referee: Francesco Fourneau |

| 11 December 2020 11 | Chievo | 3–0 | Reggina | Verona |
| 21:00 CET | Margiotta 25', 57'; Palmiero (yellow card) 37'; Cotali (yellow card) 69' (yellow-red card) 90+2'; Rigione 76' | Report | Bellomo (yellow card) 29'; Del Prato (yellow card) 45+1'; Laffert (yellow card) 56'; Rivas (yellow card) 63' | Stadium: Stadio Marcantonio Bentegodi; Attendance: 0 Referee: Giovanni Ayroldi |

| 14 December 2020 12 | Reggina | 1–2 | Venezia | Reggio Calabria |
| 15:30 CET | Lafferty 11', (yellow card) 38'; Di Chiara (yellow card) 41'; Rolando (yellow card) 56'; Liotti (yellow card) 72'; Bellomo (yellow card) 87' | Report | Cremonesi (yellow card) 59'; Aramu 76'; Bocalon 83', (yellow card) 84'; Di Mariano (yellow card) 85' | Stadium: Stadio Oreste Granillo; Attendance: 0 Referee: Fabio Maresca |

| 19 December 2020 13 | Reggina | 1–3 | Cittadella | Reggio Calabria |
| 21:30 CET | Liotti 21', (red card) 58'; De Rose (yellow card) 57'; Stavropoulos (yellow card) 81' | Report | Tsadjout 40' (pen.); Proia 53'; Donnarumma (yellow card) 60'; Perticone (yellow card) 65'; Branca 70' | Stadium: Stadio Oreste Granillo; Attendance: 0 Referee: Luca Massimi |

| 22 December 2020 14 | Vicenza | 1–1 | Reggina | Vicenza |
| 19:00 CET | Barlocco (yellow card) 33'; Longo (yellow card) 52' (yellow-red card) 66', (goal) 59'; Cinelli (yellow card) 61'; Padella (yellow card) 90' | Report | Loiacono (yellow card) 36'; Bianchi 44'; Crisetig (yellow card) 55'; Bellomo (yellow card) 58' | Stadium: Stadio Romeo Menti; Attendance: 0 Referee: Gianluca Aureliano |

| 27 December 2020 15 | Reggiana | 0–1 | Reggina | Reggio Emilia |
| 12:30 CET | | Report | Stavropoulos (yellow card) 77' (yellow-red card) 86'; Bellomo 88' | Stadium: Mapei Stadium – Città del Tricolore; Attendance: 0 Referee: Daniele Amabile |

| 30 December 2020 16 | Reggina | 1–0 | Cremonese | Reggio Calabria |
| 15:00 CET | Del Prato (yellow card) 29'; Folorunsho 45+1'; Rivas (yellow card) 81' | Report | Valer (yellow card) 45'; Strizzolo (yellow card) 76' (yellow-red card) 76' | Stadium: Stadio Oreste Granillo; Attendance: 0 Referee: Maurizio Mariani |

| 4 January 2021 17 | Ascoli | 2–1 | Reggina | Ascoli Piceno |
| 17:00 CET | Brosco (yellow card) 26'; Cangiano 83', (yellow card) 90+3'; Kragl (yellow card) 87', (goal) 90+1' | Report | Liotti 19'; De Rose (yellow card) 62' | Stadium: Stadio Cino e Lillo Del Duca; Attendance: 0 Referee: Davide Ghersini |

| 16 January 2021 18 | Reggina | 0–1 | Lecce | Reggio Calabria |
| 16:00 CET | Ménez (penalty missed); Šitum (yellow card) 70' | Report | Stępiński 28'; Coda (yellow card) 45+2' (yellow-red card) 67'; Henderson (yellow card) 54'; Tachtsidis (yellow card) 58'; Listkowski (yellow card) 63'; Gabriel (yellow card) 90+1' | Stadium: Stadio Oreste Granillo; Attendance: 0 Referee: Manuel Volpi |

| 23 January 2021 19 | Frosinone | 1–1 | Reggina | Frosinone |
| 14:00 CET | Szymiński (yellow card) 16'; Rohdén (yellow card) 58'; Zampano (yellow card) 65'; Tabanelli 84' (pen.) | Report | Folorunsho 29'; Crisetig (yellow card) 33'; Ménez (yellow card) 59'; Di Chiara (yellow card) 71'; Lakićević (yellow card) 83' | Stadium: Stadio Benito Stirpe; Attendance: 0 Referee: Marco Serra |

| 1 February 2021 20 | Reggina | 0–0 | Salernitana | Reggio Calabria |
| 21:00 CET | Montalto (yellow card) 43'; Nícolas (yellow card) 50'; Loiacono (yellow card) 86' | Report | Gondo (yellow card) 45+1'; Di Tacchio (yellow card) 47'; Đurić (penalty missed); Coulibaly (yellow card) 55'; Kiyine (yellow card) 78'; Bogdan (yellow card) 90+2' | Stadium: Stadio Oreste Granillo; Attendance: 0 Referee: Rosario Abisso |

| 6 February 2021 21 | Pescara | 0–2 | Reggina | Pescara |
| 14:00 CET | Dessena (yellow card) 9'; Maistro (yellow card) 10'; Rigoni (yellow card) 32'; Busellato (yellow card) 85' | Report | Di Chiara (yellow card) 39'; Lakićević (yellow card) 45+1'; Denis 73'; Montalto 79'; Ménez (yellow card) 83'; Dalle Mura (yellow card) 90+5' | Stadium: Stadio Adriatico; Attendance: 0 Referee: Fabio Maresca |

| 10 February 2021 22 | Reggina | 1–0 | Virtus Entella | Reggio Calabria |
| 19:00 CET | Montalto (yellow card) 8', (goal) 12' (pen.); Okwonkwo (yellow card) 75'; Crimi (yellow card) 83'; Di Chiara (yellow card) 90+1' | Report | Chiosa (yellow card) 15' | Stadium: Stadio Oreste Granillo; Attendance: 0 Referee: Davide Massa |

| 15 February 2021 23 | Cosenza | 2–2 | Reggina | Cosenza |
| 21:00 CET | Schiavi (yellow card) 7'; Trotta 39'; Tremolada (yellow card) 46'; Carretta (yellow card) 55', (goal) 84' (pen.); Ba (yellow card) 74' | Report | Ménez 9' (pen.); Di Chiara (yellow card) 12'; Folorunsho 22'; Rivas (yellow card) 43'; Crisetig (yellow card) 70' | Stadium: Stadio San Vito-Gigi Marulla; Attendance: 0 Referee: Livio Marinelli |

| 21 February 2021 24 | Reggina | 1–0 | Pordenone | Reggio Calabria |
| 15:00 CET | Edera (yellow card) 30'; Folorunsho 63'; Nícolas (yellow card) 90+5' | Report | Magnino (yellow card) 34'; Scavone (yellow card) 45+1' | Stadium: Stadio Oreste Granillo; Attendance: 0 Referee: Simone Sozza |

| 27 February 2021 25 | SPAL | 1–4 | Reggina | Ferrera |
| 14:00 CET | Mora (yellow card) 6' (yellow-red card) 8'; Esposito 53'; Sernicola (yellow card) 65' | Report | Rivas 16', 49', (yellow card) 45+1'; Montalto 19', (yellow card) 28'; Crimi (yellow card) 37'; Folorunsho 67'; Crisetig (yellow card) 82' | Stadium: Stadio Paolo Mazza; Attendance: 0 Referee: Alessandro Prontera |

| 2 March 2021 26 | Reggina | 0–3 | Empoli | Reggio Calabria |
| 19:00 CET | | Report | 23' Olivieri; 54' Mancuso; (yellow card) 57' Štulac; (yellow card) 59' Brignoli; (yellow card) 86', (goal) 90' Ryder Matos | Stadium: Stadio Oreste Granillo; Referee: Paolo Valeri |

| 6 March 2021 27 | Pisa | 0–0 | Reggina | Pisa |
| 14:00 CET | Caracciolo (yellow card) 60' | Report | | Stadium: Arena Garibaldi; Referee: Matteo Marchetti |

| 13 March 2021 28 | Reggina | 1–0 | Monza | Reggio Calabria |
| 14:00 CET | Crimi (yellow card) 35'; Lakićević (yellow card) 42'; Rivas 55'; Thiago Cionek (yellow card) 59' | Report | (yellow card) 23' Bellusci; (yellow card) 60' Scozzarella; (yellow card) 87' Donati; (yellow card) 90+2' Paletta | Stadium: Stadio Oreste Granillo; Referee: Davide Ghersini |

| 16 March 2021 29 | Brescia | 1–0 | Reggina | Brescia |
| 19:00 CET | van de Looi 46' | Report | (yellow card) 71' Ménez; (yellow card) 74' Stavropoulos; (yellow card) 87' Loiacono | Stadium: Stadio Mario Rigamonti; Attendance: 0 Referee: Francesco Meraviglia |

| 21 March 2021 30 | Reggina | 1–1 | Chievo | Reggio Calabria |
| 15:00 CET | Montalto (yellow card) 11'; Crisetig (yellow card) 34'; Dalle Mura (yellow card) 40'; Denis 88' | Report | 46' Đorđević; (yellow card) 80' Šemper; (yellow card) 84' Cotali | Stadium: Stadio Oreste Granillo; Attendance: 0 Referee: Daniele Paterna |

| 2 April 2021 31 | Venezia | 0–2 | Reggina | Venice |
| 19:00 CEST | Aramu (yellow card) 74' | Report | (yellow card) 28' Okwonkwo; (yellow card) 45+1', (goal) 52' Di Chiara; (yellow card) 56' Lakićević; 67' Šitum | Stadium: Stadio Pier Luigi Penzo; Attendance: 0 Referee: Matteo Gariglio |

| 5 April 2021 32 | Cittadella | v | Reggina | Cittadella |
| 15:00 CEST | | Report | | Stadium: Stadio Pier Cesare Tombolato |

=== Coppa Italia ===
The draw for the tournament was held on 8 September 2020. Reggina will enter in the second round.

| 30 September 2020 Second round | Reggina | 1–0 | Teramo | Reggio Calabria |
| 14:00 CEST | 34'; Folorunsho (yellow card) 70' | Report | Ilari (yellow card) 17'; Viero (yellow card) 55' | Stadium: Stadio Oreste Granillo; Referee: Alberto Santoro |

| 27 October 2020 Third round | Bologna | 2–0 | Reggina | Bologna |
| 15:00 CET | Sansone (yellow card) 57'; Vignato 70'; Michael (yellow card) 71'; Orsolini 73' | Report | Lafferty (yellow card) 16'; Stavropoulos (yellow card) 47'; De Rose (yellow card) 71' | Stadium: Stadio Renato Dall'Ara; Referee: Gianluca Manganiello |

== Squad statistics ==
=== Appearances ===
Players with no appearances not included in the list.

As of match played 2 April 2021

| No. | Pos. | Nat. | Name | Serie B | | Coppa Italia | | Total | |
| No. | Pos. | Nat. | Name | Apps | Starts | Apps | Starts | Apps | Starts |
|---|---|---|---|---|---|---|---|---|---|
| 1 | GK | (Italy) | Enrico Guarna | 8 | 8 | 1 | 1 | 9 | 9 |
| 12 | GK | (Italy) | Alessandro Plizzari | 10 | 9 | 0 | 0 | 10 | 9 |
| 88 | GK | (Brazil) | Nícolas | 14 | 14 | 0 | 0 | 14 | 14 |
| 2 | MF | (Nigeria) | Kingsley Michael | 3 | 2 | 0 | 0 | 3 | 2 |
| 3 | DF | (Poland) | Thiago Cionek | 25 | 22 | 1 | 0 | 26 | 22 |
| 4 | DF | (Greece) | Dimitrios Stavropoulos | 14 | 12 | 1 | 1 | 15 | 13 |
| 6 | DF | (Italy) | Giuseppe Loiacono | 28 | 23 | 0 | 0 | 28 | 23 |
| 7 | FW | (France) | Jérémy Ménez | 15 | 11 | 0 | 0 | 15 | 11 |
| 8 | MF | (Italy) | Lorenzo Crisetig | 28 | 26 | 1 | 0 | 29 | 26 |
| 9 | FW | (Nigeria) | Orji Okwonkwo | 9 | 4 | 0 | 0 | 9 | 4 |
| 10 | FW | (Italy) | Nicola Bellomo | 26 | 15 | 1 | 0 | 27 | 15 |
| 13 | DF | (Italy) | Marco Rossi | 7 | 6 | 0 | 0 | 7 | 6 |
| 15 | MF | (Italy) | Nicolò Bianchi | 30 | 21 | 1 | 1 | 31 | 22 |
| 17 | DF | (Italy) | Gianluca Di Chiara | 27 | 21 | 1 | 1 | 28 | 22 |
| 19 | FW | (Argentina) | Germán Denis | 23 | 8 | 1 | 0 | 24 | 8 |
| 20 | FW | (Italy) | Simone Edera | 10 | 9 | 0 | 0 | 10 | 9 |
| 21 | FW | (Sweden) | Nikola Vasic | 8 | 1 | 0 | 0 | 8 | 1 |
| 23 | MF | (Romania) | Claudiu Micovschi | 6 | 3 | 0 | 0 | 6 | 3 |
| 24 | MF | (Italy) | Enrico Del Prato | 21 | 20 | 1 | 1 | 22 | 21 |
| 25 | MF | (Italy) | Marco Crimi | 11 | 10 | 0 | 0 | 11 | 10 |
| 30 | MF | (Italy) | Adriano Montalto | 10 | 6 | 0 | 0 | 10 | 6 |
| 31 | DF | (Italy) | Daniele Gasparetto | 4 | 3 | 0 | 0 | 4 | 3 |
| 32 | DF | (Italy) | Christian Dalle Mura | 5 | 1 | 0 | 0 | 5 | 1 |
| 33 | DF | (Serbia) | Ivan Lakićević | 8 | 8 | 0 | 0 | 8 | 8 |
| 90 | MF | (Italy) | Michael Folorunsho | 25 | 17 | 1 | 1 | 26 | 18 |
| 91 | MF | (Senegal) | Ricardo Faty | 3 | 0 | 1 | 1 | 4 | 1 |
| 92 | FW | (Croatia) | Mario Šitum | 17 | 10 | 0 | 0 | 17 | 10 |
| 94 | DF | (Italy) | Daniele Liotti | 23 | 16 | 1 | 1 | 24 | 17 |
| 99 | MF | (Honduras) | Rigoberto Rivas | 21 | 17 | 0 | 0 | 21 | 17 |
Players transferred out during the season
| 11 | MF | (Morocco) | Hachim Mastour | 9 | 0 | 2 | 2 | 11 | 2 |
| 14 | DF | (Italy) | Gabriele Rolando | 11 | 8 | 2 | 0 | 13 | 8 |
| 18 | FW | (Northern Ireland) | Kyle Lafferty | 9 | 4 | 2 | 2 | 11 | 6 |
| 20 | MF | (Italy) | Francesco De Rose | 9 | 5 | 1 | 1 | 10 | 6 |
| 44 | MF | (Italy) | Lorenzo Peli | 1 | 0 | 1 | 1 | 2 | 1 |
| 77 | GK | (Italy) | Alessandro Faroni | 0 | 0 | 1 | 1 | 1 | 1 |

=== Goalscorers ===
As of 2 April 2021

| Rank | No. | Pos | Nat | Name | Serie B | Coppa Italia | Total |
|---|---|---|---|---|---|---|---|
| 1 | 90 | MF | (Italy) | Michael Folorunsho | 6 | 0 | 6 |
| 2 | 94 | DF | (Italy) | Daniele Liotti | 5 | 0 | 5 |
| 3 | 7 | FW | (France) | Jérémy Ménez | 3 | 0 | 3 |
| 3 | 19 | FW | (Argentina) | Germán Denis | 3 | 0 | 3 |
| 3 | 30 | MF | (Italy) | Adriano Montalto | 3 | 0 | 3 |
| 3 | 99 | MF | (Honduras) | Rigoberto Rivas | 3 | 0 | 3 |
| 7 | 8 | MF | (Italy) | Lorenzo Crisetig | 2 | 0 | 2 |
| 8 | 10 | MF | (Italy) | Nicola Bellomo | 1 | 0 | 1 |
| 8 | 15 | FW | (Italy) | Nicolò Bianchi | 1 | 0 | 1 |
| 8 | 19 | FW | (Northern Ireland) | Kyle Lafferty | 1 | 0 | 1 |
| 8 | 92 | MF | (Croatia) | Mario Šitum | 2 | 0 | 2 |
| 8 | 17 | DF | (Italy) | Gianluca Di Chiara | 1 | 1 | 2 |
| Totals | | | | | 29 | 1 | 30 |

=== Disciplinary record ===
As of match played 2 April 2021

| No. | Pos. | Name | Serie B | | | Coppa Italia | | | Total | | |
| No. | Pos. | Name | Yellow card | (yellow card) (yellow-red card) | Red card | Yellow card | (yellow card) (yellow-red card) | Red card | Yellow card | (yellow card) (yellow-red card) | Red card |
|---|---|---|---|---|---|---|---|---|---|---|---|
| 1 | GK | (Italy) Enrico Guarna | 1 | 0 | 0 | 0 | 0 | 0 | 0 | 1 | 0 |
| 3 | DF | (Poland) Thiago Cionek | 3 | 0 | 0 | 0 | 0 | 0 | 3 | 0 | 0 |
| 5 | DF | (Greece) Dimitrios Stavropoulos | 2 | 1 | 0 | 1 | 0 | 0 | 2 | 1 | 0 |
| 6 | DF | (Italy) Giuseppe Loiacono | 5 | 0 | 0 | 0 | 0 | 0 | 5 | 0 | 0 |
| 7 | FW | (France) Jérémy Ménez | 6 | 0 | 1 | 0 | 0 | 0 | 6 | 0 | 1 |
| 8 | MF | (Italy) Lorenzo Crisetig | 8 | 1 | 0 | 0 | 0 | 0 | 8 | 1 | 0 |
| 9 | FW | (Nigeria) Orji Okwonkwo | 2 | 0 | 0 | 0 | 0 | 0 | 2 | 0 | 0 |
| 10 | MF | (Italy) Nicola Bellomo | 6 | 0 | 0 | 0 | 0 | 0 | 6 | 0 | 0 |
| 12 | GK | (Italy) Alessandro Plizzari | 1 | 0 | 0 | 0 | 0 | 0 | 2 | 0 | 0 |
| 13 | DF | (Italy) Marco Rossi | 4 | 0 | 0 | 0 | 0 | 0 | 4 | 0 | 0 |
| 14 | DF | (Italy) Gabriele Rolando | 2 | 0 | 0 | 0 | 0 | 0 | 2 | 0 | 0 |
| 15 | MF | (Italy) Nicolò Bianchi | 1 | 0 | 0 | 0 | 0 | 0 | 1 | 0 | 0 |
| 17 | DF | (Italy) Gianluca Di Chiara | 8 | 0 | 0 | 0 | 0 | 0 | 8 | 0 | 0 |
| 19 | FW | (Northern Ireland) Kyle Lafferty | 2 | 0 | 0 | 1 | 0 | 0 | 3 | 0 | 0 |
| 20 | FW | (Italy) Simone Edera | 1 | 0 | 0 | 0 | 0 | 0 | 1 | 0 | 0 |
| 20 | MF | (Italy) Francesco De Rose | 2 | 0 | 0 | 1 | 0 | 0 | 3 | 0 | 0 |
| 24 | DF | (Italy) Enrico Del Prato | 4 | 0 | 0 | 0 | 0 | 0 | 4 | 0 | 0 |
| 25 | MF | (Italy) Marco Crimi | 3 | 0 | 0 | 0 | 0 | 0 | 3 | 0 | 0 |
| 30 | MF | (Italy) Adriano Montalto | 4 | 0 | 0 | 0 | 0 | 0 | 4 | 0 | 0 |
| 32 | DF | (Italy) Christian Dalle Mura | 2 | 0 | 0 | 0 | 0 | 0 | 2 | 0 | 0 |
| 33 | DF | (Serbia) Ivan Lakićević | 4 | 0 | 0 | 0 | 0 | 0 | 4 | 0 | 0 |
| 88 | GK | (Brazil) Nícolas | 2 | 0 | 0 | 0 | 0 | 0 | 2 | 0 | 0 |
| 90 | MF | (Italy) Michael Folorunsho | 4 | 1 | 0 | 1 | 0 | 0 | 5 | 1 | 0 |
| 92 | FW | (Croatia) Mario Šitum | 2 | 0 | 0 | 0 | 0 | 0 | 2 | 0 | 0 |
| 94 | DF | (Italy) Daniele Liotti | 2 | 0 | 1 | 0 | 0 | 0 | 2 | 0 | 1 |
| 99 | MF | (Honduras) Rigoberto Rivas | 4 | 0 | 0 | 0 | 0 | 0 | 4 | 0 | 0 |
