= 2021–22 Reggina 1914 season =

Reggina
2021–22 season
- President: Luca Gallo
- Manager: Alfredo Aglietti
- Stadium: Stadio Oreste Granillo
- Serie B: Pre-season
- Coppa Italia: First round
- Highest home attendance: 5,825
- Lowest home attendance: 5,005
- All statistics correct as of 6 September 2021.

The 2021-22 season will be Reggina 1914's 107th season in existence. It will be their second consecutive season in Serie B. They will also participate in this season's Coppa Italia.

== First-team squad ==
As of 16 July 2021

| No. | Player | Nationality | Date of birth | Signed from | Apps | Goals |
Goalkeepers
Defenders
| 3 | Thiago Cionek | (Poland) | 21 May 1986 (age 40) | S.P.A.L. | 30 | 1 |
| 4 | Dimitrios Stavropoulos | (Greece) | 1 May 1997 (age 29) | (Greece) Panionios | 22 | 0 |
| 6 | Giuseppe Loiacono | (Italy) | 6 October 1991 (age 34) | Foggia | 59 | 2 |
| 13 | Vasco Regini | (Italy) | 9 September 1990 (age 36) | Sampdoria | 0 | 0 |
| 17 | Gianluca Di Chiara | (Italy) | 26 December 1993 (age 32) | Perugia | 35 | 2 |
| 27 | Claud Adjapong | (Italy) | 6 May 1998 (age 28) | Sassuolo | 0 | 0 |
| 33 | Ivan Lakićević | (Serbia) | 27 July 1993 (age 33) | Genoa | 11 | 0 |
| 77 | Damiano Franco | (Italy) | 22 February 2002 (age 24) | Lazio | 0 | 0 |
| 94 | Daniele Liotti | (Italy) | 8 June 1994 (age 32) | Pisa | 41 | 6 |
Midfielders
| 5 | Lorenzo Gavioli | (Italy) | 7 January 2000 (age 26) | Inter Milan | 0 | 0 |
| 8 | Lorenzo Crisetig | (Italy) | 20 January 1993 (age 33) | Unattached | 36 | 2 |
| 11 | Federico Ricci | (Italy) | 27 May 1994 (age 32) | Sassuolo | 0 | 0 |
| 15 | Nicolò Bianchi | (Italy) | 24 February 1992 (age 34) | Vicenza | 69 | 3 |
| 25 | Marco Crimi | (Italy) | 17 March 1990 (age 36) | Virtus Entella | 16 | 0 |
| 91 | Ricardo Faty | (Senegal) | 4 August 1986 (age 40) | (Turkey) Ankaragücü | 5 | 0 |
| 92 | Mario Šitum | (Croatia) | 4 April 1992 (age 34) | (Turkey) Kayserispor | 21 | 2 |
| 99 | Rigoberto Rivas | (Honduras) | 31 July 1998 (age 28) | Inter | 44 | 7 |
Forwards
| 7 | Jérémy Ménez | (France) | 7 May 1987 (age 39) | Unattached | 18 | 3 |
| 10 | Nicola Bellomo | (Italy) | 18 February 1991 (age 35) | Salernitana | 78 | 9 |
| 19 | Germán Denis | (Argentina) | 10 September 1981 (age 45) | (Peru) Universitario | 56 | 16 |
| 30 | Adriano Montalto | (Italy) | 6 April 1988 (age 38) | Bari | 16 | 6 |

== Transfers and loans ==
=== Transfers in ===
| Entry date | Position | No. | Player | From club | Fee | Ref. |
|---|---|---|---|---|---|---|
| 30 June 2021 | MF | 99 | (Honduras) Rigoberto Rivas | Inter | €350,000 | |
| 13 July 2021 | FW | 11 | (Italy) Federico Ricci | Sassuolo | | |
| 13 July 2021 | DF | 13 | (Italy) Vasco Regini | Sampdoria | | |
| 15 July 2021 | DF | 22 | (Italy) Damiano Franco | Lazio | | |
| 15 July 2021 | DF | | (Italy) Gaetano Ungaro | Unattached | Free | |
| 16 July 2021 | MF | 21 | (Tunisia) Karim Laribi | Hellas Verona | Undisclosed | |
| 28 July 2021 | MF | 56 | (Finland) Përparim Hetemaj | Benevento | Free | |
| 18 August 2021 | FW | 16 | (Bulgaria) Andrey Galabinov | Spezia | Free | |

=== Loans in ===
| Start date | End date | Position | No. | Player | From club | Fee | Ref. |
|---|---|---|---|---|---|---|---|
| 30 June 2021 | 30 June 2022 | MF | 5 | (Italy) Lorenzo Gavioli | Inter | | |
| 13 July 2021 | 30 June 2022 | GK | 12 | (Italy) Alessandro Micai | Salernitana | | |
| 13 July 2021 | 30 June 2022 | GK | 63 | (Italy) Stefano Turati | Sassuolo | | |
| 17 August 2021 | 30 June 2022 | FW | 93 | (Italy) Marco Tumminello | Atalanta | | |

=== Transfers out ===
| Exit date | Position | No. | Player | To club | Fee | Ref. |
|---|---|---|---|---|---|---|
| 26 June 2021 | DF | | (Italy) Paolo Marchi | Piacenza | Free | |
| 30 June 2021 | MF | | (Italy) Lorenzo Paolucci | (Belgium) Union SG | Undisclosed | |
| 6 July 2021 | GK | | (Italy) Enrico Guarna | Ascoli | Free | |
| 28 July 2021 | MF | | (Italy) Gabriele Rolando | Catanzaro | | |
| 25 August 2021 | DF | | (Italy) Daniele Gasparetto | Legnago Salus | | |
| 31 August 2021 | DF | | (Italy) Matteo Rubin | Vis Pesaro | Free | |
| 31 August 2021 | MF | 25 | (Italy) Marco Crimi | Triestina | | |
| 31 August 2021 | DF | | (Italy) Marco Rossi | Seregno Calcio | | |

=== Loans out ===
| Start date | End date | Position | No. | Player | To club | Fee | Ref. |
|---|---|---|---|---|---|---|---|
| 7 July 2021 | 30 June 2022 | GK | | (Italy) Alessandro Farroni | Vis Pesaro | None | |
| 16 July 2021 | 31 December 2021 | MF | | (Sweden) Nikola Vasic | (Sweden) Vasalunds IF | None | |

== Pre-season and friendlies ==
Reggina began preparations for the new season on July 10 with medical testing at Centro sportivo Sant'Agata in Reggio Calabria. A squad of 23 players began training in Sarnano on July 14.

Results list Reggina's goal tally first.

| Date | Opponent | Venue | Result | Scorers | Attendance |
|---|---|---|---|---|---|
| 21 July 2021 | Foligno | Neutral | 4–1 | Ricci (2), Bezzon, Laribi | 0 |
| 29 July 2021 | Benevento | Neutral | 1–3 | Bellomo | 0 |
| 6 August 2021 | Reggiomediterranea | Neutral | 8–0 | Rivas, Denis (3), Bezzon (2), Bellomo, Provazza | 0 |
| 11 August 2021 | Vibonese | Away | 2–0 | Rivas, Šitum | 0 |
| 4 September 2021 | FC Lamezia Terme | Away | 2–0 | Montalto, Loiacono | 0 |

== Competitions ==
=== Overview ===
| Competition | First match | Last match | Starting round | Record | | | | | | | |
| Competition | First match | Last match | Starting round | Pld | W | D | L | GF | GA | GD | Win % |
|---|---|---|---|---|---|---|---|---|---|---|---|
| Serie B | 22 August 2021 | May 2022 | Matchday 1 | | | | | — | | | |
| Coppa Italia | 16 August 2021 | 16 August 2021 | First round | 1 | 0 | 0 | 1 | 0 | 2 | −2 | 0.00 |
| Total | | | | 1 | 0 | 0 | 1 | 0 | 2 | −2 | 0.00 |

Last updated: 20 August 2021
Source: Competitions

=== Serie B ===
==== League table ====
| Pos | Team | Pld | W | D | L | GF | GA | GD | Pts | Promotion, qualification or relegation |
|---|---|---|---|---|---|---|---|---|---|---|
| 12 | Parma | 38 | 11 | 16 | 11 | 48 | 43 | +5 | 49 | |
| 13 | Como | 38 | 11 | 14 | 13 | 49 | 54 | −5 | 47 | |
| 14 | Reggina (Note: Reggina were deducted 2 points for administrative irregularities.) | 38 | 13 | 9 | 16 | 31 | 49 | −18 | 46 | |
| 15 | SPAL | 38 | 9 | 15 | 14 | 46 | 54 | −8 | 42 | |
| 16 | Cosenza (O) | 38 | 8 | 11 | 19 | 36 | 59 | −23 | 35 | Qualification for relegation play-out |

Source: Lega Serie B (in Italian), Soccerway (in English)
Rules for classification: 1) Points; 2) Head-to-head points; 3) Head-to-head goal difference; 4) Goal difference; 5) Goals scored; 6) Draw.
(O) Play-off winners

==== Results summary ====
| Overall | | | | | | | | Home | | | | | | Away | | | | | |
| Pld | W | D | L | GF | GA | GD | Pts | W | D | L | GF | GA | GD | W | D | L | GF | GA | GD |
|---|---|---|---|---|---|---|---|---|---|---|---|---|---|---|---|---|---|---|---|
| 18 | 6 | 5 | 7 | 16 | 24 | −8 | 23 | 3 | 2 | 4 | 9 | 13 | −4 | 3 | 3 | 3 | 7 | 11 | −4 |

Last updated: 18 December 2021.

==== Results by round ====
| Round | 1 | 2 | 3 | 4 | 5 | 6 | 7 | 8 | 9 | 10 | 11 | 12 | 13 | 14 | 15 | 16 | 17 | 18 | 19 | 20 | 21 | 22 | 23 | 24 | 25 | 26 | 27 | 28 | 29 | 30 | 31 | 32 | 33 | 34 | 35 | 36 | 37 | 38 |
|---|---|---|---|---|---|---|---|---|---|---|---|---|---|---|---|---|---|---|---|---|---|---|---|---|---|---|---|---|---|---|---|---|---|---|---|---|---|---|
| Ground | H | H | A | H | A | H | A | A | H | A | H | A | H | A | H | A | H | A | H | A | | | | | | | | | | | | | | | | | | |
| Result | D | W | D | W | D | D | L | W | W | W | L | W | L | L | L | L | L | D | | | | | | | | | | | | | | | | | | | | |
| Position | 13 | 7 | 8 | 7 | 6 | 8 | 10 | 8 | 3 | 5 | 4 | 4 | 6 | 9 | 11 | 12 | 13 | 14 | | | | | | | | | | | | | | | | | | | | |

Updated to match(es) played on 18 December 2021. Source:
A = Away; H = Home; W = Win; D = Draw; L = Loss

==== Matches ====
| 22 August 2021 1 | Reggina | 0 - 0 | Monza | Reggio Calabria |
| 18:00 CET | Bianchi (yellow card) 65'; Laribi (yellow card) 76'; Cionek (yellow card) 90+2' | Report | Pedro Pereira (yellow card) 73'; Sampirisi (red card) 80'; Barillà (yellow card) 87'; Bellusci (yellow card) 88' | Stadium: Stadio Oreste Granillo; Attendance: 5,825; Referee: (Italy) Antonio Giua |

| 29 August 2021 2 | Reggina | 3 - 2 | Ternana | Reggio Calabria |
| 20:30 CET | Hetemaj (yellow card) 19'; Crisetig (yellow card) 21'; Ménez (yellow card) 45' (yellow-red card) 59' (goal) 50'; Stavropoulos (yellow card) 56'; Galabinov 65' (pen.); Rivas 69' | Report | Agazzi (yellow card) 7' (yellow-red card) 25'; Falletti (yellow card) 24' (goal) 42'; Boden (yellow card) 75'; Mazzocchi 79'; Proietti (red card) 90+4' | Stadium: Stadio Oreste Granillo; Attendance: 5,005; Referee: (Italy) Antonio Di Martino |

| 11 September 2021 3 | Crotone | 1 - 1 | Reggina | Crotone |
| 18:30 CET | Estévez (yellow card) 16'; Ahmad Benali 58'; Visentin (yellow card) 81' | Report | Di Chiara (yellow card) 22'; Crisetig (yellow card) 35'; Galabinov 43'; Hetemaj (yellow card) 77'; Stavropoulos (yellow card) 83' | Stadium: Stadio Ezio Scida; Attendance: 2,220; Referee: (Italy) Michael Fabbri |

| 18 September 2021 4 | Reggina | 2 - 1 | SPAL | Reggio Calabria |
| 14:00 CET | Hetemaj 16'; Montalto 68' | Report | Salvatore Esposito 36' (pen.); Capradossi (yellow card) 43'; Viviani (yellow card) 49'; Vicari (yellow card) 60'; Crociata (yellow card) 70' | Stadium: Stadio Oreste Granillo; Attendance: 4,773; Referee: (Italy) Niccolo Baroni |

| 21 September 2021 5 | Pordenone | 1 - 1 | Reggina | Lignano Sabbiadoro |
| 20:30 CET | Zammarini (yellow card) 28'; Magnino 43'; El Kaouakibi (yellow card) 44'; Camporese (yellow card) 67'; Chrzanowski (red card) 90+3' | Report | Rivas (yellow card) 29'; Lakićević (yellow card) 80'; Galabinov 85' | Stadium: Stadio Guido Teghil; Attendance: 815; Referee: (Italy) Francesco Meraviglia |

| 25 September 2021 6 | Reggina | 0 - 0 | Frosinone | Reggio Calabria |
| 16:15 CET | Rivas (yellow card) 36'; Crisetig (yellow card) 42'; Regini (yellow card) 57' | Report | Gatti (yellow card) 23'; Ricci (yellow card) 34'; Boloca (yellow card) 43'; Garritano (yellow card) 69'; Novakovich (yellow card) 90+1' | Stadium: Stadio Oreste Granillo; Attendance: 5,034; Referee: (Italy) Simone Sozza |

| 2 October 2021 7 | Pisa | 2 - 0 | Reggina | Pisa |
| 16:15 CET | Cionek 6' (o.g.); Lucca 68' (pen.); Sibilli (yellow card) 71'; Caracciolo (yellow card) 90+3' | Report | Micai (red card) 64'; Crisetig (yellow card) 80'; Di Chiara (yellow card) 90+1' | Stadium: Arena Garibaldi – Stadio Romeo Anconetani; Attendance: 5,029; Referee: (Italy) Andrea Colombo |

| 16 October 2021 8 | Vicenza | 0 - 1 | Reggina | Ferrara |
| 14:00 CET | Longo (yellow card) 22'; Diaw (yellow card) 23'; Pasini (yellow card) 56'; Meggiorini (yellow card) 86' | Report | Bianchi (yellow card) 17'; Galabinov 31' | Stadium: Stadio Paolo Mazza; Attendance: 5,251; Referee: (Italy) Matteo Gariglio |

| 24 October 2021 9 | Reggina | 2 - 1 | Parma | Reggio Calabria |
| 16:15 CET | Ménez 14' (yellow card) 55'; Bellomo (yellow card) 32'; Cionek (yellow card) 43'; Di Chiara (yellow card) 61'; Stavropoulos (yellow card) 65'; Galabinov 72' (pen.) | Report | Schiattarella (yellow card) 7'; Man (yellow card) 40'; Vázquez (yellow card) 41' (goal) 82'; Jurić (yellow card) 71'; Mihăilă (yellow card) 75' | Stadium: Stadio Oreste Granillo; Attendance: 8,693; Referee: (Italy) Luca Zufferli |

| 28 October 2021 10 | Perugia | 0 - 2 | Reggina | Perugia |
| 20:30 CET | Ryder Matos (yellow card) 36'; Kouan (yellow card) 57'; Burrai (yellow card) 71' | Report | Galabinov 5'; Bellomo (yellow card) 32' (goal) 45'; Crisetig (yellow card) 57'; Ricci (yellow card) 90+2' | Stadium: Stadio Renato Curi; Attendance: 4,223; Referee: (Italy) Giacomo Campione |

=== Coppa Italia ===
Results list Reggina's goal tally first.

| Date | Round | Opponent | Venue | Result | Scorers | Attendance |
|---|---|---|---|---|---|---|
| 16 August 2021 | First round | Salernitana | Away | 2–0 | | 2,476 |

== Squad statistics ==
=== Appearances ===
| No. | Pos | Nat | Player | Total | | Serie B | | Coppa Italia | |
| No. | Pos | Nat | Player | Apps | Goals | Apps | Goals | Apps | Goals |
Goalkeepers
| 12 | GK | (Italy) ITA | Alessandro Micai | 3 | 0 | 2 | 0 | 1 | 0 |
Defenders
| 3 | DF | (Poland) POL | Thiago Cionek | 3 | 0 | 2 | 0 | 1 | 0 |
| 4 | DF | (Greece) GRE | Dimitrios Stavropoulos | 3 | 0 | 2 | 0 | 1 | 0 |
| 17 | DF | (Italy) ITA | Gianluca Di Chiara | 3 | 0 | 2 | 0 | 1 | 0 |
| 27 | DF | (Italy) ITA | Claud Adjapong | 1 | 0 | 0 | 0 | 0+1 | 0 |
| 33 | DF | (Serbia) SRB | Ivan Lakićević | 3 | 0 | 2 | 0 | 1 | 0 |
| 94 | DF | (Italy) ITA | Daniele Liotti | 1 | 0 | 0+1 | 0 | 0 | 0 |
Midfielders
| 8 | MF | (Italy) ITA | Lorenzo Crisetig | 3 | 0 | 2 | 0 | 1 | 0 |
| 10 | MF | (Italy) ITA | Nicola Bellomo | 3 | 0 | 0+2 | 0 | 0+1 | 0 |
| 11 | MF | (Italy) ITA | Federico Ricci | 3 | 0 | 2 | 0 | 1 | 0 |
| 15 | MF | (Italy) ITA | Nicolò Bianchi | 3 | 0 | 1+1 | 0 | 0+1 | 0 |
| 21 | MF | (Tunisia) TUN | Karim Laribi | 3 | 0 | 1+1 | 0 | 1 | 0 |
| 56 | MF | (Finland) FIN | Përparim Hetemaj | 2 | 0 | 1 | 0 | 1 | 0 |
| 92 | MF | (Croatia) CRO | Mario Šitum | 1 | 0 | 0+1 | 0 | 0 | 0 |
| 99 | MF | (Honduras) HON | Rigoberto Rivas | 3 | 1 | 2 | 1 | 1 | 0 |
Forwards
| 7 | FW | (France) FRA | Jérémy Ménez | 3 | 1 | 1+1 | 1 | 0+1 | 0 |
| 16 | FW | (Bulgaria) BUL | Andrey Galabinov | 2 | 1 | 1+1 | 1 | 0 | 0 |
| 19 | FW | (Argentina) ARG | Germán Denis | 1 | 0 | 0 | 0 | 0+1 | 0 |
| 30 | FW | (Italy) ITA | Adriano Montalto | 3 | 0 | 1+1 | 0 | 1 | 0 |

Source: Competitions

Last updated: 29 August 2021
