= 2022–23 Reggina 1914 season =

Reggina
2022–23 season
- Owner: Felice Saladini
- Manager: Filippo Inzaghi
- Stadium: Stadio Oreste Granillo
- Serie B: 7th
- Coppa Italia: Round of 64
- Top goalscorer: League: Giovanni Fabbian (8); All: Giovanni Fabbian (8)
Away colours

The 2022–23 season was the 109th in the history of Reggina 1914 and their third consecutive season in the second division. The club participated in Serie B and Coppa Italia.

== Players ==
Note: Flags indicate national team as defined under FIFA eligibility rules; some limited exceptions apply. Players may hold more than one non-FIFA nationality.

No.	Pos.	Nation	Player
1	GK	ITA	Nikita Contini (on loan from Napoli)
3	DF	POL	Thiago Cionek
6	DF	ITA	Giuseppe Loiacono
7	FW	FRA	Jérémy Ménez
8	MF	ITA	Lorenzo Crisetig (Captain)
9	FW	ITA	Gabriele Gori (on loan from Fiorentina)
11	FW	ITA	Emanuele Cicerelli (on loan from Lazio)
12	GK	ITA	Tomasso Aglietti
13	DF	ITA	Devid Eugene Bouah
14	MF	ITA	Giovanni Fabbian (on loan from Inter)
16	FW	BUL	Andrey Galabinov
17	DF	ITA	Gianluca Di Chiara
19	FW	SVK	David Strelec (on loan from Spezia)

No.	Pos.	Nation	Player
20	MF	BRA	Hernani (on loan from Parma)
21	MF	ITA	Federico Ricci
22	GK	ITA	Simone Colombi
23	DF	ITA	Michele Camporese
24	DF	ITA	Emanuele Terranova
25	MF	ITA	Alessandro Lombardi
27	MF	ITA	Niccolò Pierozzi (on loan from Fiorentina)
28	DF	SWE	Riccardo Gagliolo
31	FW	ITA	Luigi Canotto (on loan from Frosinone)
37	MF	SLO	Žan Majer
38	MF	FRA	Warren Bondo (on loan from Monza)
94	DF	ITA	Daniele Liotti
99	MF	HON	Rigoberto Rivas

=== Other players under contract ===
As of 31 January 2022

Note: Flags indicate national team as defined under FIFA eligibility rules; some limited exceptions apply. Players may hold more than one non-FIFA nationality.

No.	Pos.	Nation	Player
10	MF	NGR	Joel Obi

=== Out on loan ===
Note: Flags indicate national team as defined under FIFA eligibility rules; some limited exceptions apply. Players may hold more than one non-FIFA nationality.

No.	Pos.	Nation	Player
—	DF	ITA	Damiano Franco (at Siena until 30 June 2023)
—	MF	ITA	Federico Giraudo (at Cittadella until 30 June 2024)
—	MF	MAR	Yassine Ejjaki (at Mantova until 30 June 2023)
—	MF	ITA	Lorenzo Gavioli (at Pro Patria until 30 June 2023)
—	FW	ITA	Adriano Montalto (at Reggiana until 30 June 2023)

No.	Pos.	Nation	Player
—	FW	ITA	Ottavio Gabriele Garau (at Vis Pesaro until 30 June 2023)
—	FW	ITA	Giuseppe Monteleone (at Lamezia Terme until 30 June 2023)
—	FW	ITA	Alessandro Provazza (at Vis Pesaro until 30 June 2023)
—	FW	PAR	Federico Santander (at Guaraní until 30 June 2023)

== Pre-season and friendlies ==
Win Draw Loss

26 July 2022 Friendly	Lamezia Terme (Italy)	0–12	(Italy) Reggina
19:00 CEST (UTC+2)

30 July 2022 Trofeo Angelo Iervolino	Reggina (Italy)	1–0	(Turkey) Adana Demirspor	Salerno
CEST (UTC+2)	Liotti 15'			Stadium: Stadio Arechi; Referee: Livio Marinelli

30 July 2022 Trofeo Angelo Iervolino	Salernitana (Italy)	1–0	(Italy) Reggina	Salerno
CEST (UTC+2)	Kristoffersen 10'			Stadium: Stadio Arechi; Referee: Livio Marinelli

22 December 2022 Friendly	Reggina (Italy)	0–2	(Italy) Inter Milan	Reggio Calabria
18:00 CEST (UTC+2)		Report		Stadium: Stadio Oreste Granillo

== Competitions ==
=== Overall record ===
Competition	First match	Last match	Starting round	Final position	Record							
Competition	First match	Last match	Starting round	Final position	Pld	W	D	L	GF	GA	GD	Win %
Serie B	12 August 2022	19 May 2023	Matchday 1	7th	38	17	4	17	49	45	+4	44.74
Promotion play-offs	26 May 2023		Preliminary round	Preliminary round	1	0	0	1	0	1	−1	0.00
Coppa Italia	5 August 2022		Round of 64	Round of 64	1	0	0	1	0	1	−1	0.00
Total					40	17	4	19	49	47	+2	42.50

Source: Soccerway

=== Serie B ===
==== League table ====
Pos	Team	Pld	W	D	L	GF	GA	GD	Pts	Promotion, qualification or relegation
5	Cagliari (O, P)	38	15	15	8	50	34	+16	60 (Note: Parma finished ahead of Cagliari on head-to-head points: Cagliari 1–1 Parma, Parma 2–1 Cagliari.)	Qualification for promotion play-offs preliminary round
6	Südtirol	38	14	16	8	38	34	+4	58	Qualification for promotion play-offs preliminary round
7	Reggina (Note: Reggina were deducted five points for failing to pay taxes and player salaries on time. The deduction was initially seven points; later relegated to Serie D after enduring serious financial difficulties for several years. Brescia was readmitted into Serie B.) (E)	38	17	4	17	49	45	+4	50	Revival in Serie D
8	Venezia	38	13	10	15	51	50	+1	49	Qualification for promotion play-offs preliminary round
9	Palermo	38	11	16	11	48	49	−1	49	

Source: Soccerway (in English)
Rules for classification: 1) Points; 2) Head-to-head points; 3) Head-to-head goal difference; 4) Goal difference; 5) Goals scored; 6) Draw.
(E) Eliminated; (O) Play-off winners; (P) Promoted

==== Results summary ====
Overall								Home						Away					
Pld	W	D	L	GF	GA	GD	Pts	W	D	L	GF	GA	GD	W	D	L	GF	GA	GD
38	17	4	17	49	45	+4	55	10	2	7	28	22	+6	7	2	10	21	23	−2

Source: Serie B

==== Results by round ====
Round	1	2	3	4	5	6	7	8	9	10	11	12	13	14	15	16	17	18	19	20	21	22	23	24	25	26	27	28	29	30	31	32	33	34	35	36	37	38
Ground	A	A	H	H	A	H	A	H	A	H	A	H	A	H	A	H	A	H	A	H	H	A	A	H	A	H	A	H	A	H	A	H	A	H	A	H	A	H
Result	W	L	W	W	W	W	L	W	L	L	D	W	W	D	W	L	W	D	W	L	W	L	L	L	L	W	L	L	W	L	L	W	D	L	L	W	L	W
Position	1	7	3	1	1	1	1	1	2	4	4	2	2	2	2	2	2	2	2	2	2	3	3	4	5	4	5	6	6	7	8	5	5	8	8	11	10	7

Source: Serie B
A = Away; H = Home; W = Win; D = Draw; L = Loss

==== Matches ====
The league fixtures were announced on 15 July 2022.

13 August 2022 1	SPAL	1–3	Reggina	Ferrara
20:45 CEST (UTC+2)	Viviani (yellow card) 62'; La Mantia 79'; Dickmann (yellow card) 88'; Murgia (yellow card) 90+4'	Report	Fabbian (yellow card) 18'; Crisetig 45+3'; Pierozzi (yellow card) 47'; Ménez 52'; Rivas 67'	Stadium: Stadio Paolo Mazza; Attendance: 7,489; Referee: (Italy) Daniele Perenzoni

21 August 2022 2	Ternana	1–0	Reggina	Terni
20:45 CEST (UTC+2)	Di Tacchio (yellow card) 16'; Partipilo 26'; Celli (yellow card) 76'	Report	Cionek (yellow card) 19'	Stadium: Stadio Libero Liberati; Attendance: 5,320; Referee: (Italy) Francesco Meraviglia

28 August 2022 3	Reggina	4–0	Südtirol	Reggio Calabria
20:45 CEST (UTC+2)	Crisetig (yellow card) 10'; Fabbian 35' (yellow card) 50'; Majer 45+1'; Pierozzi 61'; Lombardi 70'	Report	Odogwu (yellow card) 6'; Curto (yellow card) 12' (red card) 24'; Pompetti (yellow card) 69'; Mazzocchi (yellow card) 84'	Stadium: Stadio Oreste Granillo; Attendance: 11,504; Referee: (Italy) Daniele Rutella

3 September 2022 4	Reggina	3–0	Palermo	Reggio Calabria
14:00 CEST (UTC+2)	Fabbian 7'; Pierozzi (yellow card) 19'; Di Chiara (yellow card) 29'; Canotto (yellow card) 39'; Ménez 58'; Cionek (red card) 63'; Liotti 73'	Report	Bettella (yellow card) 66' (yellow-red card) 84'	Stadium: Stadio Oreste Granillo; Attendance: 13,013; Referee: (Italy) Luca Massimi

10 September 2022 5	Pisa	0–1	Reggina	Pisa
14:00 CEST (UTC+2)	Masucci (yellow card) 56'; Barba (yellow card) 79'; Mastinu (yellow card) 81'	Report	Canotto 28'; Pierozzi (yellow card) 70'; Colombi (yellow card) 74'	Stadium: Arena Garibaldi – Stadio Romeo Anconetani; Attendance: 7,337; Referee: (Italy) Marco Serra

17 September 2022 6	Reggina	3–0	Cittadella	Reggio Calabria
14:00 CEST (UTC+2)	Fabbian (yellow card) 15' (goal) 58'; Gagliolo 22' (yellow card) 85'; Crisetig (yellow card) 54'; Gori 88'	Report	Donnarumma (yellow card) 21'; Carriero (yellow card) 49'; Frare (yellow card) 78'; Mamadou Tounkara (yellow card) 85'	Stadium: Stadio Oreste Granillo; Attendance: 9,197; Referee: (Italy) Lorenzo Maggioni

1 October 2022 7	Modena	1–0	Reggina	Modena
14:00 CET (UTC+1)	Pergreffi (yellow card) 32'; Gerli (yellow card) 56'; Armellino (yellow card) 62'; Diaw 65'	Report	Pierozzi (yellow card) 33'; Loiacono (yellow card) 58'; Gagliolo (yellow card) 60'	Stadium: Stadio Alberto Braglia; Attendance: 10,718; Referee: (Italy) Matteo Marcenaro

8 October 2022 8	Reggina	3–0	Cosenza	Reggio Calabria
16:15 CET (UTC+1)	Rivas 9'; Ménez 52'; Pierozzi 62'	Report	D'Urso (yellow card) 16'; Rispoli (yellow card) 55'; Butić (yellow card) 76'; Martino (red card) 88'	Stadium: Stadio Oreste Granillo; Attendance: 15,417; Referee: (Italy) Paolo Valeri

15 October 2022 9	Parma	2–0	Reggina	Parma
14:00 CET (UTC+1)	Coulibaly (yellow card) 15'; Oosterwolde (yellow card) 45+1' (goal) 51'; Valenti 74'	Report	Majer (yellow card) 73'	Stadium: Stadio Ennio Tardini; Attendance: 12,146; Referee: (Italy) Michael Fabbri

22 October 2022 10	Reggina	2–3	Perugia	Reggio Calabria
14:00 CET (UTC+1)	Majer (yellow card) 11'; Cionek (yellow card) 60'; Gori 80'; Fabbian 87'	Report	Melchiorri 18' 62' (pen.); Paz (yellow card) 32'; Santoro (yellow card) 51' (yellow-red card) 55'; Di Serio 73'; Casasola (yellow card) 90+1'	Stadium: Stadio Oreste Granillo; Attendance: 8,974; Referee: (Italy) Francesco Meraviglia

29 October 2022 11	Cagliari	1–1	Reggina	Cagliari
14:00 CET (UTC+1)	Lapadula 3' (yellow card) 90+2'; Di Pardo (yellow card) 45+2'; Viola (yellow card) 54'	Report	Hernani (yellow card) 2'; Gagliolo 24' (yellow card) 62'; Obi (yellow card) 83'	Stadium: Unipol Domus; Attendance: 11,225; Referee: (Italy) Federico La Penna

7 November 2022 12	Reggina	2–1	Genoa	Reggio Calabria
20:30 CET (UTC+1)	Canotto 15'; Hernani 54' (pen.); Rivas (yellow card) 57'; Ravaglia (yellow card) 83'	Report	Aramu 33'; Sabelli (yellow card) 40'; Bani (yellow card) 40'; Guðmundsson (yellow card) 58'; Yalçın (yellow card) 81'; Strootman (yellow card) 89'; Frendrup (yellow card) 90'	Stadium: Stadio Oreste Granillo; Attendance: 14,005; Referee: (Italy) Fabio Maresca

12 November 2022 13	Venezia	1–2	Reggina	Venice
14:00 CET (UTC+1)	Pohjanpalo 10'; Haps (yellow card) 73'	Report	Canotto 55' (yellow card) 57'; Liotti (yellow card) 73'; Hernani 76'; Ménez (yellow card) 87'	Stadium: Stadio Pier Luigi Penzo; Attendance: 4,013; Referee: (Italy) Matteo Marcenaro

27 November 2022 14	Reggina	2–2	Benevento	Reggio Calabria
12:30 CET (UTC+1)	Hernani 21' (pen.); Canotto 36'; Fabbian (yellow card) 78'; Ravaglia (yellow card) 84'; Majer (yellow card) 86'; Cionek (yellow card) 90+2'; Camporese (yellow card) 90+3'	Report	Leverbe (yellow card) 49'; Karić (yellow card) 55'; Improta 59'; Acampora 82' (yellow card) 90+3'	Stadium: Stadio Oreste Granillo; Attendance: 8,377; Referee: (Italy) Luca Zufferli

4 December 2022 15	Brescia	0–2	Reggina	Brescia
15:00 CET (UTC+1)	Papetti (yellow card) 38'; van de Looi (yellow card) 47'; Adorni (yellow card) 54'	Report	Fabbian 3'; Ménez 11'; Gagliolo (yellow card) 12'; Hernani (yellow card) 77'	Stadium: Stadio Mario Rigamonti; Attendance: 4,822; Referee: (Italy) Davide Ghersini

8 December 2022 16	Reggina	0–3	Frosinone	Reggio Calabria
15:00 CET (UTC+1)	Ménez (yellow card) 30'	Report	Mulattieri 34'; Insigne (yellow card) 43' (goal) 50'; Szymiński 68'; Turati (yellow card) 70'; Borrelli (yellow card) 87'	Stadium: Stadio Oreste Granillo; Attendance: 14,648; Referee: (Italy) Maurizio Mariani

11 December 2022 17	Como	0–1	Reggina	Como
15:00 CET (UTC+1)	Vignali (yellow card) 38'; Bellemo (yellow card) 77'; Cutrone (yellow card) 90+8'	Report	Ménez (yellow card) 67'; Hernani 78' (pen.); Gagliolo (yellow card) 90+1'; Colombi (yellow card) 90+8'	Stadium: Stadio Giuseppe Sinigaglia; Attendance: 5,207; Referee: (Italy) Ivano Pezzuto

17 December 2022 18	Reggina	0–0	Bari	Reggio Calabria
20:30 CET (UTC+1)	Majer (yellow card) 26'	Report	Di Cesare (yellow card) 24'; Bellomo (yellow card) 45+5'; Maita (yellow card) 49'; Pucino (yellow card) 70'	Stadium: Stadio Oreste Granillo; Attendance: 15,657; Referee: (Italy) Michael Fabbri

26 December 2022 19	Ascoli	–	Reggina	Ascoli Piceno
15:00 CET (UTC+1)				Stadium: Stadio Cino e Lillo Del Duca

==== Promotion play-offs ====
26 May 2023 Preliminary round	Südtirol	1–0	Reggina	Bolzano
20:30 CEST (UTC+2)	Casiraghi 89'	Report		Stadium: Druso; Attendance: 5,419; Referee: Antonio Rapuano

=== Coppa Italia ===
5 August 2022 Round of 64	Sampdoria	1–0	Reggina	Genoa
21:15 CEST (UTC+2)	Sabiri 66' (pen.)	Report	Fabbian (yellow card) 17'; Giraudo (yellow card) 53'; Cionek (yellow card) 59'; Canotto (yellow card) 85'; Cicerelli (penalty missed) 89'; Gagliolo (yellow card) 90+7'	Stadium: Stadio Luigi Ferraris; Referee: Maria Sole Ferrieri Caputi
