= Dalle Mura =

Dalle Mura is an Italian surname. Notable people with the surname include:

- Christian Dalle Mura (born 2002), Italian footballer
- Sauro Dalle Mura (1926–2017), Italian politician
