= Matteo Ardemagni =

Italian football forward

Personal information
- Full name: Matteo Carlo Ardemagni
- Date of birth: 26 March 1987 (age 39)
- Place of birth: Milan, Italy
- Height: 1.85 m (6 ft 1 in)
- Position: Striker

Team information
- Current team: Civitanovese

Senior career*
Years	Team	Apps	(Gls)
2005–2008	Milan	0	(0)
2006–2007	→ Perugia (loan)	12	(0)
2007	→ Pizzighettone (loan)	12	(0)
2007–2008	→ Pro Patria (loan)	20	(2)
2008–2009	Triestina	24	(1)
2009–2010	Cittadella	39	(22)
2010–2016	Atalanta	16	(1)
2011	→ Padova (loan)	22	(3)
2012–2013	→ Modena (loan)	56	(28)
2013–2014	→ Chievo (loan)	2	(0)
2014	→ Carpi (loan)	16	(4)
2014–2015	→ Spezia (loan)	8	(0)
2015–2016	→ Perugia (loan)	53	(17)
2016–2018	Avellino	59	(20)
2018–2020	Ascoli	36	(11)
2020–2022	Frosinone	12	(0)
2021	→ Reggiana (loan)	16	(1)
2022–2023	Siena	15	(3)
2023–2024	Chieti	18	(0)
2024–2026	Pavia	9	(0)
2026–	Civitanovese		

International career
2004	Italy U-18	2	(0)
2005–2006	Italy U-19	4	(0)
- * Club domestic league appearances and goals as of 11 January 2026

Matteo Carlo Ardemagni (born 26 March 1987) is an Italian footballer who plays as a forward for Eccellenza club Civitanovese.

== Career ==
=== Milan ===
A product of Milan's youth team, he has made a few appearances as a substitute for their Serie A team. He was then sent on loan to various Serie C1 teams, namely Perugia, Pizzighettone and Pro Patria, before being ultimately sold to Serie B side Triestina in July 2008 in a co-ownership agreement with the alabardati, for €5,000. In June 2009 Triestina bought him outright for another €50,000.

=== Cittadella ===
In summer 2009 Ardemagni left for Cittadella in a temporary deal as its flagship striker Riccardo Meggiorini left for Bari (via Inter Milan and Genoa). Ardemagni was the team top-scorer in 2009–10 season with 22 goals.

=== Atalanta ===
In June 2010, Cittadella bought him in a co-ownership deal, for €100,000, but on 13 July 2010 he was sold to fellow Serie B side Atalanta for €3.55 million (€1.45 million to Triestina, €2.1 million to Cittadella, as well as cost extra €200,000 to Atalanta) which were recently relegated from Serie A. It was reported that Chievo also made a bid to Triestina but Atalanta agreed a deal with Cittadella. He signed a 4-year contract. As part of the deal, Cittadella signed Manolo Gabbiadini and Daniele Gasparetto in a co-ownership deal for a small fee of €500 each on 13 July.

In January 2011 he was loaned to Padova. He returned to Serie B again in January 2012, for Modena. Circa 2012 Ardemagni also signed a new 5-year contract with Atalanta, however he was loaned to Modena, Cheivo and Carpi in 2012–13 and 2013–14 season.

On 9 August 2014 he was signed by Spezia on a temporary deal. On 2 February 2015 he was signed by Perugia. The loan was extended on 14 July.

=== Avellino ===
On 31 August 2016 Ardemagni was signed by Avellino in a definitive deal on a three-year contract.

=== Ascoli ===
On 16 August 2018 he was signed by Ascoli on a three-year deal.

=== Frosinone ===
On 27 January 2020 he moved to Frosinone. On 12 January 2021 he joined Reggiana on loan.

=== Siena ===
On 31 January 2022, Ardemagni signed with Siena.

== Career statistics ==
As of Match played 3 April 2022

Appearances and goals by club, season and competition
Club	Season	League			Cup		Other		Total	
Club	Season	Division	Apps	Goals	Apps	Goals	Apps	Goals	Apps	Goals
Triestina	2008–09	Serie B	24	1	0	0	0	0	24	1
Cittadella	2009–10	Serie B	39	22	1	0	0	0	40	22
Atalanta	2010–11	Serie B	16	1	1	1	0	0	17	2
Atalanta	2011–12	Serie A	0	0	0	0	0	0	0	0
Atalanta	Total		16	1	1	1	0	0	17	2
Padova (loan)	2010–11	Serie B	22	3	0	0	0	0	22	3
Modena (loan)	2011–12	Serie B	20	5	0	0	0	0	20	5
Modena (loan)	2012–13	Serie B	39	23	2	2	0	0	41	25
Modena (loan)	Total		59	28	2	2	0	0	61	30
Chievo (loan)	2013–14	Serie A	2	0	1	1	0	0	3	1
Carpi (loan)	2013–14	Serie B	16	4	0	0	0	0	16	4
Spezia (loan)	2014–15	Serie B	8	0	2	0	0	0	10	0
Perugia (loan)	2014–15	Serie B	17	6	0	0	0	0	17	6
Perugia (loan)	2015–16	Serie B	36	11	2	2	0	0	38	13
Perugia (loan)	Total		53	17	2	2	0	0	55	19
Avellino	2016–17	Serie B	35	13	0	0	0	0	35	13
Avellino	2017–18	Serie B	24	6	1	0	0	0	25	6
Avellino	Total		59	19	1	0	0	0	60	19
Ascoli	2018–19	Serie B	18	8	3	1	0	0	21	9
Ascoli	2019–20	Serie B	18	3	0	0	0	0	18	3
Ascoli	Total		36	11	3	1	0	0	39	12
Frosinone	2019–20	Serie B	11	0	0	0	0	0	11	0
Frosinone	2020–21	Serie B	1	0	1	0	0	0	2	0
Frosinone	Total		12	0	1	0	0	0	13	0
Reggiana (loan)	2020–21	Serie B	16	1	0	0	0	0	16	1
Siena	2021–22	Serie C	12	1	0	0	0	0	12	1
Career totals			374	108	14	7	0	0	388	115
