= Kingsley Michael =

Nigerian footballer (born 1999)

Personal information
- Full name: Kingsley Dogo Michael
- Date of birth: 26 August 1999 (age 27)
- Place of birth: Owerri, Nigeria
- Height: 1.76 m (5 ft 9 in)
- Position: Midfielder

Team information
- Current team: DSV Leoben
- Number: 14

Youth career
- –2017: Abuja
- 2017–2018: Bologna

Senior career*
Years	Team	Apps	(Gls)
2018–2023	Bologna	3	(0)
2018–2019	→ Perugia (loan)	25	(1)
2019–2020	→ Cremonese (loan)	10	(0)
2021	→ Reggina (loan)	3	(0)
2022–2023	→ SV Ried (loan)	13	(0)
2023–	DSV Leoben	16	(0)

International career^{‡}
2015	Nigeria U17	7	(1)
2021–	Nigeria	1	(0)
- * Club domestic league appearances and goals as of 26 May 2024 ‡ National team caps and goals as of 7 September 2021

Kingsley Dogo Michael (born 26 August 1999) is a Nigerian footballer who plays as a midfielder for Austrian club DSV Leoben and the Nigeria national team

== Club career ==
He joined Italian club Bologna on 29 August 2017 and was assigned to their Under-19 team. At the end of the 2017–18 Serie A season he made some bench appearances for Bologna's senior squad, but did not see any time on the field.

On 15 August 2018, he joined Serie B club Perugia on a season-long loan. He made his Serie B debut for Perugia on 24 August 2018 in a game against Brescia as a 79th-minute substitute for Raffaele Bianco.

He made his Serie A debut for Bologna on the opening day of the 2019–20 season, he started the game against Verona on 25 August 2019.

On 2 September 2019, Michael joined Cremonese on loan until 30 June 2020.

On 1 February 2021, Michael moved to Serie B side Reggina, on a loan deal until the end of the season.

On 9 August 2022, Michael was loaned to SV Ried in Austria. On 2 May 2023, the loan was terminated early.

== International ==
He represented Nigeria national under-17 football team at the 2015 African U-17 Championship, where Nigeria finished 4th, and 2015 FIFA U-17 World Cup, which Nigeria won. Michael scored a goal in the 3–0 quarterfinal victory over Brazil, but did not appear in the semifinal or final.

He made his debut for the Nigeria national football team on 7 September 2021 in a World Cup qualifier against Cape Verde, a 2–1 away victory. He started the game and played the whole match.

== Career statistics ==
=== Club ===
As of match played 23 August 2023

Appearances and goals by club, season and competition
Club	Season	League			National Cup (Note: Includes Coppa Italia, Austrian Cup)		Europe		Other		Total	
Club	Season	Division	Apps	Goals	Apps	Goals	Apps	Goals	Apps	Goals	Apps	Goals
Perugia (loan)	2018–19	Serie B	25	1	0	0	—		—		25	1
Bologna	2019–20	Serie A	1	0	1	0	—		—		2	0
Bologna	2020–21	Serie A	0	0	1	0	—		—		1	0
Bologna	2021–22	Serie A	2	0	0	0	—		—		2	0
Bologna	Total		3	0	2	0	—		—		5	0
Cremonese (loan)	2019–20	Serie B	10	0	0	0	—		—		10	0
Reggina (loan)	2020–21	Serie B	3	0	0	0	—		—		3	0
SV Ried (loan)	2022–23	Austrian Bundesliga	13	0	1	0	—		—		14	0
DSV Leoben	2023–24	Austrian 2. Liga	16	0	3	0	—		—		19	0
Career total			70	1	6	0	—		—		76	1
