= Thiago Cionek =

Polish footballer (born 1986)

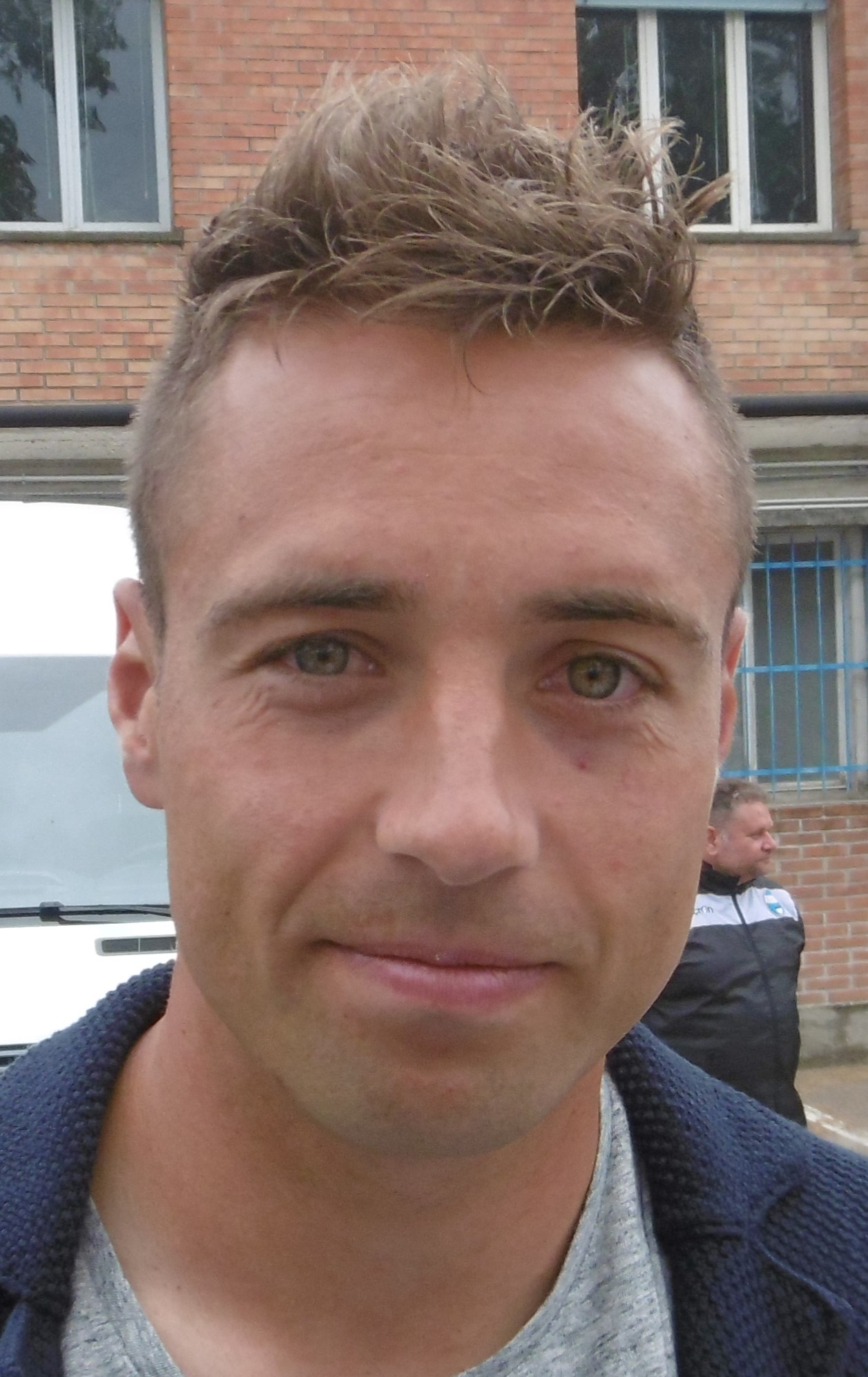
- Cionek in 2018

Personal information
- Full name: Thiago Rangel Cionek
- Date of birth: 21 April 1986 (age 40)
- Place of birth: Curitiba, Brazil
- Height: 1.84 m (6 ft 0 in)
- Position: Centre-back

Team information
- Current team: Cavese
- Number: 26

Youth career
- Vila Hauer EC

Senior career*
Years	Team	Apps	(Gls)
2005–2006	Cuiabá		
2006–2007	Bragança	2	(1)
2007–2008	CRB	1	(0)
2008–2012	Jagiellonia Białystok	91	(3)
2012–2014	Padova	31	(0)
2013–2014	→ Modena (loan)	33	(1)
2014–2016	Modena	51	(1)
2016–2018	Palermo	50	(1)
2018–2020	SPAL	74	(1)
2020–2023	Reggina	88	(1)
2023–2025	Avellino	37	(2)
2025–	Cavese	28	(1)

International career
2014–2018	Poland	21	(0)
- * Club domestic league appearances and goals as of 1 May 2026

Thiago Rangel Cionek (Polish pronunciation: [ˈtjaɡɔ ˈtɕɔnɛk], Brazilian Portuguese: [tʃiˈagu ˈtʃonek(i)]; born 21 April 1986) is a professional footballer who plays as a centre-back for Serie C Group C club Cavese. Born in Brazil, he played for the Poland national team.

== Club career ==
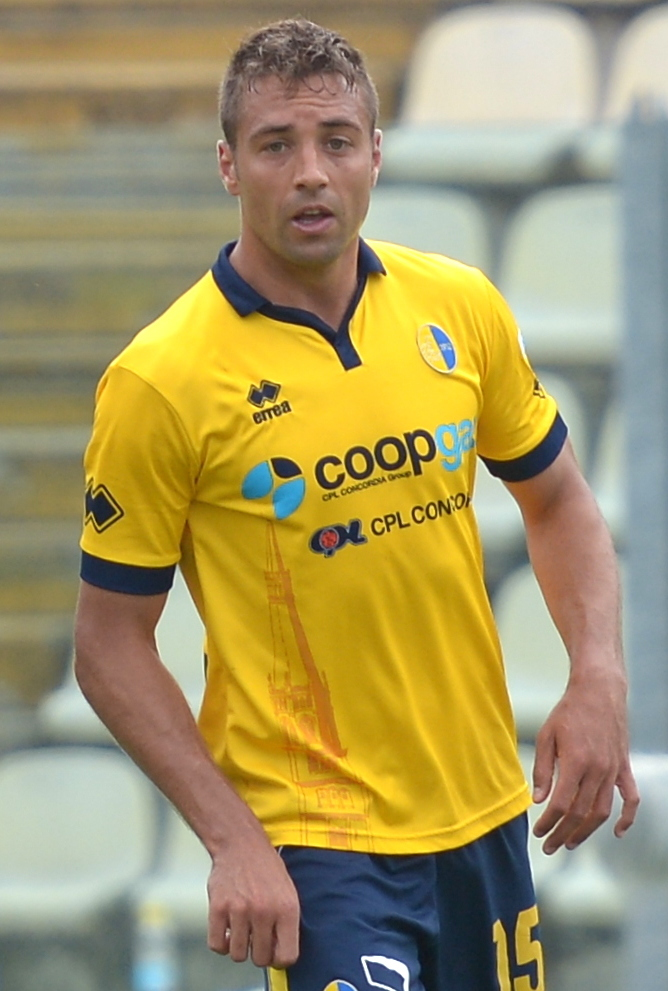
Cionek with Modena in 2015

Born in Curitiba, Paraná, Cionek began his career with local side Cuiabá Esporte Clube. He moved to Europe for a brief spell at Portugal's GD Bragança before returning to Brazil with Clube de Regatas Brasil. In 2008, Cionek returned to Europe, playing four seasons with Jagiellonia Białystok in his ancestral Poland. With Jagiellonia Białystok, he won the 2009–10 Polish Cup and the 2010 Polish Super Cup.

He then spent a year in Serie B with Padova, before signing for another club from the same division, Modena, on 2 September 2013. On 11 January 2016, he joined his third Italian club, Palermo of Serie A. Two years later, with his contract was due to expire at the end of the season, he was sold to SPAL of the same league on a 2 1/2-year contract.

On 28 September 2020, he signed a three-year contract with Serie B club Reggina.

On 9 August 2023, Serie C side Avellino announced the signing of Cionek on a two-year contract.

== International career ==
While having been born and raised in Curitiba, Brazil, Cionek's family is of Polish descent and he therefore applied for Polish citizenship, which he received in October 2011. Cionek made his international debut for the Poland national team, on 13 May 2014, starting in a goalless friendly draw against Germany in Hamburg. Cionek then was called up by Poland's national team to play in the 2016 European Championship in France.

In May 2018, he was named in Poland's preliminary 35-man squad for the 2018 FIFA World Cup in Russia. On 19 June, in Poland's initial World Cup match against Senegal, Cionek scored an own goal that opened a 2–1 loss.

== Career statistics ==
=== Club ===
As of match played 4 April 2026

Appearances and goals by club, season and competition
Club	Season	League			National cup (Note: Includes Polish Cup, Coppa Italia)		Europe		Other		Total	
Club	Season	Division	Apps	Goals	Apps	Goals	Apps	Goals	Apps	Goals	Apps	Goals
Jagiellonia Białystok	2008–09	Ekstraklasa	12	1	2	1	—		5 (Note: Five appearances in Ekstraklasa Cup)	0	19	2
Jagiellonia Białystok	2009–10	Ekstraklasa	27	1	5	0	—		—		32	1
Jagiellonia Białystok	2010–11	Ekstraklasa	21	0	3	0	1 (Note: Appearance(s) in UEFA Europa League)	0	1 (Note: Appearance in Polish Super Cup)	0	26	0
Jagiellonia Białystok	2011–12	Ekstraklasa	29	1	1	0	2	0	—		32	1
Jagiellonia Białystok	2012–13	Ekstraklasa	2	0	0	0	—		—		2	0
Jagiellonia Białystok	Total		91	3	11	1	3	0	6	0	111	4
Padova	2012–13	Serie B	30	0	0	0	—		—		30	0
Padova	2013–14	Serie B	1	0	2	0	—		—		3	0
Padova	Total		31	0	2	0	—		—		33	0
Modena (loan)	2013–14	Serie B	30	1	0	0	—		3 (Note: Appearance(s) in Serie B promotion play-offs)	0	33	1
Modena	2014–15	Serie B	34	1	3	0	—		2 (Note: Appearances in Serie B relegation play-out)	0	39	1
Modena	2015–16	Serie B	15	0	2	0	—		—		17	0
Modena	Total		81	2	5	0	—		3	0	89	2
Palermo	2015–16	Serie A	5	0	0	0	—		—		5	0
Palermo	2016–17	Serie A	29	0	1	0	—		—		30	0
Palermo	2017–18	Serie B	16	1	2	0	—		—		18	1
Palermo	Total		50	1	3	0	—		—		53	1
SPAL	2017–18	Serie A	15	1	0	0	—		—		15	1
SPAL	2018–19	Serie A	31	0	2	0	—		—		33	0
SPAL	2019–20	Serie A	28	0	2	1	—		—		30	1
SPAL	Total		74	1	4	1	—		—		78	2
Reggina	2020–21	Serie B	29	1	1	0	—		—		30	1
Reggina	2021–22	Serie B	27	0	1	0	—		—		28	0
Reggina	2022–23	Serie B	31	0	1	0	—		1	0	33	0
Reggina	Total		87	1	3	0	—		1	0	91	1
Avellino	2023–24	Serie C	27	1	—		—		4 (Note: Three appearances in Serie C promotion play-offs, one appearance in Coppa Italia Serie C)	0	31	1
Avellino	2024–25	Serie C	9	1	—		—		3 (Note: Two appearances in Coppa Italia Serie C, one appearance in Supercoppa di Serie C)	0	12	1
Avellino	Total		36	2	—		—		7	0	43	2
Cavese	2025–26	Serie C	28	1	—		—		0	0	28	1
Career total			478	11	28	2	3	0	17	0	526	13

=== International ===
Appearances and goals by national team and year
National team	Year	Apps	Goals
Poland	2014	2	0
Poland	2015	2	0
Poland	2016	6	0
Poland	2017	6	0
Poland	2018	5	0
Total		21	0

== Honours ==
Jagiellonia Białystok

- Polish Cup: 2009–10
- Polish Super Cup: 2010

Avellino

- Serie C Group C: 2024–25
