= Lorenzo Peli =

Italian footballer (born 2000)

Personal information
- Date of birth: 24 January 2000 (age 26)
- Place of birth: Seriate, Italy
- Height: 1.72 m (5 ft 8 in)
- Position: Right winger

Team information
- Current team: Pianese
- Number: 5

Youth career
- –2019: Atalanta

Senior career*
| Years | Team | Apps | (Gls) |
| 2018–2025 | Atalanta | 0 | (0) |
| 2019–2020 | → Como (loan) | 18 | (0) |
| 2020–2021 | → Reggina (loan) | 1 | (0) |
| 2021–2022 | → Como (loan) | 15 | (0) |
| 2022–2023 | → Novara (loan) | 15 | (0) |
| 2023 | → Pontedera (loan) | 13 | (4) |
| 2023–2024 | → Ancona (loan) | 13 | (2) |
| 2024 | → Pontedera (loan) | 15 | (3) |
| 2024–2025 | → Atalanta U23 | 2 | (0) |
| 2025– | Pianese | 23 | (0) |

International career
| 2017–2018 | Italy U18 | 7 | (0) |
- * Club domestic league appearances and goals as of 30 April 2026

Lorenzo Peli (born 24 January 2000) is an Italian professional footballer who plays for Serie C Group B club Pianese.

== Club career ==
=== Atalanta ===
Peli is a product of Atalanta youth teams and started playing and won the title for their Under-19 squad in the 2018–19 season.

In the 2017–18 and 2018–19 seasons he was called up to the senior squad on several occasions, but did not make any appearances.

==== Loan to Como ====
He joined the newly-promoted Serie C club Como on loan in July 2019.

He made his professional Serie C debut for Como in September 2019 in a game against Renate. He substituted Alessandro Gabrielloni in the 81st minute.

==== Loan to Reggina ====
In August 2020 he went to Reggina (newly promoted to Serie B) on loan.

==== Return to Como ====
In January 2021 he returned to Como on loan. The loan was extended on 16 July 2021.

==== Loans to Novara and Pontedera ====
On 15 July 2022, Peli joined Novara on loan. The loan was terminated early on 31 January 2023. On the same day, Peli was loaned to Pontedera in Serie C.

==== Loan to Ancona ====
On 17 August 2023, Peli was loaned by Ancona.

== International ==
In 2017 and 2018, he played several friendlies for the Italy national under-18 football team.
