= Yassine Ejjaki =

Footballer (born 1999)

Personal information
- Date of birth: 15 May 1999 (age 27)
- Place of birth: Cremona, Italy
- Height: 1.72 m (5 ft 8 in)
- Position: Midfielder

Team information
- Current team: Aversa
- Number: 5

Youth career
- –2019: Sampdoria

Senior career*
Years	Team	Apps	(Gls)
2019–2022	Vis Pesaro	39	(1)
2021–2022	→ Reggina (loan)	4	(0)
2022–2023	Reggina	0	(0)
2022–2023	→ Mantova (loan)	6	(0)
2023–	Ragusa	34	(4)

International career^{‡}
2017	Morocco U17	4	(0)
2018	Morocco U20	2	(0)
- * Club domestic league appearances and goals as of 8 October 2023 ‡ National team caps and goals as of 1 August 2018

Yassine Ejjaki (Arabic: ياسين الجاكي; born 15 May 1999) is a footballer who plays for Serie D club Ragusa. Born in Italy, he represented Morocco internationally on junior level.

== Club career ==
On 31 August 2021, Ejjaki joined Reggina in Serie B on loan, with a conditional obligation to buy.

He made his Serie B debut for Reggina on 18 April 2022 in a game against Lecce.

Reggina acquired his rights at the end of the loan. On 1 September 2022, Ejjaki was loaned by Reggina to Mantova.
