= Sauro Dalle Mura =

Italian politician (1926 - 2017)

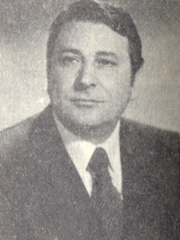
Sauro Dalle Mura

Sauro Dalle Mura (24 November 1926 – 21 May 2017) was an Italian politician.

Dalle Mura was a member of the Italian Socialist Party who served as mayor of his hometown of Carrara from 1967 to 1976, when he was elected to the Senate. He stepped down from the Senate in 1979.

Dalle Mura had two children. His son Emilio was a basketball player in Carrara and later became a physical education teacher until his death in November 2000, aged 49. His daughter was Franca. Dalle Mura died at the age of 90 on 21 May 2017.
