= Dimitrios Stavropoulos =

Greek footballer

Dimitris Stavropoulos
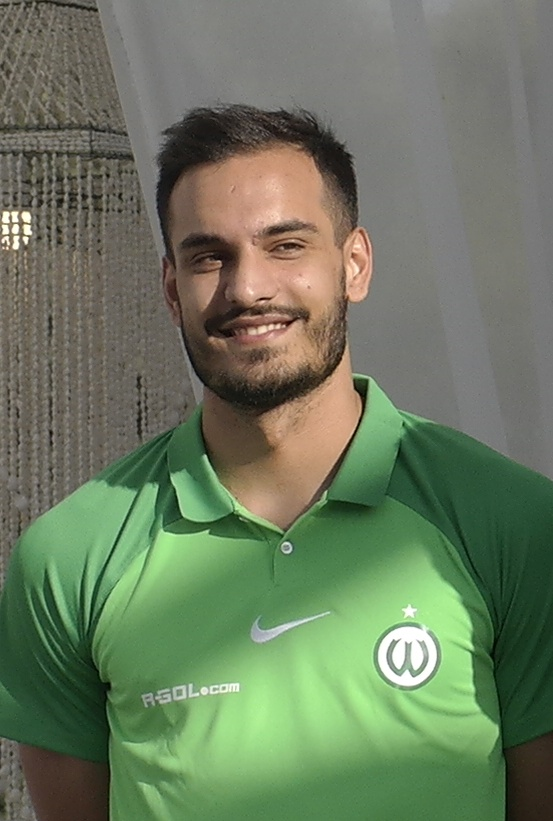
- Stavropoulos with Warta Poznań in 2023

Personal information
- Full name: Dimitrios Stavropoulos
- Date of birth: 1 May 1997 (age 29)
- Place of birth: Athens, Greece
- Height: 1.91 m (6 ft 3 in)
- Position: Centre-back

Team information
- Current team: Atromitos
- Number: 4

Youth career
- –2013: Olympiacos
- 2013–2016: Panionios

Senior career*
Years	Team	Apps	(Gls)
2016–2020	Panionios	59	(3)
2020–2022	Reggina	39	(0)
2022–2024	Warta Poznań	56	(3)
2024–	Atromitos	57	(2)
- * Club domestic league appearances and goals as of 19 September 2026

Dimitrios Stavropoulos (Greek: Δημήτριος Σταυρόπουλος; born 1 May 1997) is a Greek professional footballer who plays as a centre-back for Super League club Atromitos.

== Club career ==
On 24 August 2020, Stavropoulos joined Serie B club Reggina.

On 5 July 2022, Stavropoulos signed for Warta Poznań. On 15 July 2022, he made his Ekstraklasa debut in a 1–0 away loss against Raków Częstochowa. He left the club as a free agent at the end of the 2023–24 season.

On 12 August 2024, Stavropoulos returned to Greece to join Super League Greece club Atromitos on a deal until June 2026.

== Career statistics ==
As of 15 May 2026

Appearances and goals by club, season and competition
Club	Season	League			National cup (Note: Includes Greek Cup, Coppa Italia, Polish Cup)		Continental		Other		Total	
Club	Season	Division	Apps	Goals	Apps	Goals	Apps	Goals	Apps	Goals	Apps	Goals
Panionios	2016–17	Super League Greece	1	0	1	0	—		—		2	0
Panionios	2017–18	Super League Greece	10	0	6	0	1 (Note: Appearance in UEFA Europa League)	0	—		17	0
Panionios	2018–19	Super League Greece	17	2	6	1	—		—		23	3
Panionios	2019–20	Super League Greece	31	1	3	0	—		—		34	1
Panionios	Total		59	3	16	1	1	0	—		76	4
Reggina	2020–21	Serie B	20	0	2	0	—		—		22	0
Reggina	2021–22	Serie B	19	0	1	0	—		—		20	0
Reggina	Total		39	0	3	0	—		—		42	0
Warta Poznań	2022–23	Ekstraklasa	31	2	2	1	—		—		33	3
Warta Poznań	2023–24	Ekstraklasa	25	1	2	0	—		—		27	1
Warta Poznań	Total		56	3	4	1	—		—		60	4
Atromitos	2024–25	Super League Greece	18	0	3	0	—		—		21	0
Atromitos	2025–26	Super League Greece	33	2	5	0	—		—		38	2
Atromitos	Total		51	2	8	0	—		—		59	2
Career total			205	8	31	2	1	0	0	0	237	10
