= Lorenzo Gavioli =

Italian association football player

Personal information
- Date of birth: 7 January 2000 (age 26)
- Place of birth: Ferrara, Italy
- Height: 1.82 m (6 ft 0 in)
- Position: Midfielder

Team information
- Current team: Gozzano
- Number: 19

Youth career
- –2019: Inter Milan

Senior career*
| Years | Team | Apps | (Gls) |
| 2019–2022 | Inter Milan | 0 | (0) |
| 2019–2020 | → Venezia (loan) | 0 | (0) |
| 2020 | → Ravenna (loan) | 6 | (0) |
| 2020–2021 | → Feralpisalò (loan) | 25 | (1) |
| 2021–2022 | → Reggina (loan) | 1 | (0) |
| 2022 | → Renate (loan) | 12 | (1) |
| 2022–2023 | Reggina | 0 | (0) |
| 2022–2023 | → Pro Patria (loan) | 22 | (0) |
| 2023–2024 | Ancona | 10 | (0) |
| 2024 | Monterosi | 17 | (0) |
| 2024–2025 | Fiorenzuola | 25 | (0) |
| 2025–2026 | Campodarsego | 11 | (0) |
| 2026– | Gozzano | 8 | (0) |

International career
| 2015 | Italy U15 | 7 | (0) |
| 2015–2016 | Italy U16 | 13 | (1) |
| 2016 | Italy U17 | 5 | (0) |
| 2017–2018 | Italy U18 | 11 | (1) |
| 2018–2019 | Italy U19 | 15 | (0) |
| 2019 | Italy U20 | 1 | (0) |
- * Club domestic league appearances and goals as of 25 June 2026

Lorenzo Gavioli (born 7 January 2000) is an Italian footballer who plays as a midfielder for Serie D club Gozzano.

== Club career ==
=== Inter ===
Born in Ferrara, Gavioli is a youth exponent of Inter.

==== Loan to Venezia and Ravenna ====
On 18 July 2019, Gavioli was loaned to Serie B club Venezia on a season-long loan deal with an option to buy. One month later, on 17 August, he made his professional debut for Venezia as a substitute replacing Mattia Aramu in the 86th minute of a 3–1 away defeat against Parma in the third round of Coppa Italia. However that cup appearance remained his only game for Venezia, as he remained on the bench in every league and cups matches and in January 2020 his loan was interrupted and he returned to Inter.

On 15 January 2020, Gavioli joined Serie C club Ravenna on loan until the end of the season. Four days later, on 19 January, he made his Serie C debut for Ravenna as a substitute replacing Filippo Lora in the 46th minute of a 1–1 home draw against Fano. Three more days later, on 22 January, Gavioli played his first match as a starter for the club, a 1–0 home win over Fermana, he was replaced by Filippo Lora in the 84th minute. On 30 June he played his first entire match for the club, a 2–0 away defeat against Fano. Gavioli ended his loan to Ravenna with 8 appearances, however Ravenna was relegated to Serie D.

==== Loan to Feralpisalò ====
On 28 August 2020, Gavioli was signed by Serie C side Feralpisalò on a season-long loan deal. On 23 September he made his debut for the club as a starter in a 1–0 home win over Pineto in the first round of Coppa Italia, he was replaced by Tommaso Morosini in the 61st minute. Four days later, on 27 September, he made his league debut as a starter in a 2–1 home win over Arezzo, he was replaced by Tommaso Morosini after 57 minutes. Two weeks later, on 11 October, he scored his first professional goal, as a substitute, in the 95th minute of a 4–2 away win over Cesena. Gavioli ended his loan to FeralpiSalò with 28 appearances, 1 goal and 1 assist, he also helped the club to reach the play-off, but the club was eliminated 1–1 on aggregate by Alessandria in the quarter-finals.

==== Loans to Reggina and Renate ====
On 30 June 2021, Gavioli joined to Serie B club Reggina on loan with an obligation to buy. He made only one appearance in the first half of the season for Reggina, and on 25 January 2022 he moved on loan to Serie C club Renate.

=== Reggina ===
At the end of the 2021–22 season, Reggina purchased his rights as per the loan agreement. On 25 August 2022, Gavioli was loaned by Reggina to Pro Patria.

=== Ancona ===
On 31 August 2023, Gavioli signed with Ancona.

== Career statistics ==
=== Club ===
As of 24 April 2022

| Club | Season | League | | | Cup | | Europe | | Other | | Total | |
| Club | Season | League | Apps | Goals | Apps | Goals | Apps | Goals | Apps | Goals | Apps | Goals |
|---|---|---|---|---|---|---|---|---|---|---|---|---|
| Venezia (loan) | 2019–20 | Serie B | 0 | 0 | 1 | 0 | — | | — | | 1 | 0 |
| Ravenna (loan) | 2019–20 | Serie C | 6 | 0 | — | | — | | 2 (Note: All appearance(s) in Serie C play-out.) | 0 | 8 | 0 |
| Feralpisalò (loan) | 2020–21 | Serie C | 25 | 1 | 1 | 0 | | | 2 (Note: All appearance(s) in Serie C play-off.) | 0 | 28 | 1 |
| Reggina (loan) | 2021–22 | Serie B | 1 | 0 | 0 | 0 | — | | — | | 1 | 0 |
| Renate (loan) | 2021–22 | Serie C | 12 | 1 | 0 | 0 | — | | — | | 12 | 1 |
| Career total | | | 44 | 2 | 2 | 0 | — | | 4 | 0 | 50 | 2 |

== Honours ==
=== Club ===
Inter Primavera

- Torneo di Viareggio: 2018
- Supercoppa Primavera: 2018
- Campionato Primavera 1: 2017–18
