= Marco Rossi (footballer, born 1987) =

Italian footballer

Personal information
- Date of birth: 30 September 1987 (age 39)
- Place of birth: Parma, Italy
- Height: 1.88 m (6 ft 2 in)
- Position: Centre back

Team information
- Current team: Akragas

Youth career
- Parma

Senior career*
Years	Team	Apps	(Gls)
2005–2011	Parma	49	(2)
2007	→ Modena (loan)	18	(0)
2009–2010	→ Sampdoria (loan)	20	(1)
2010–2011	→ Bari (loan)	30	(0)
2011–2012	Cesena	21	(0)
2014–2016	Perugia	36	(0)
2015	→ Varese (loan)	13	(0)
2016–2018	Wellington Phoenix	39	(0)
2018–2019	Robur Siena	27	(1)
2019–2021	Reggina	35	(0)
2021–2022	Seregno	27	(1)
2022–2023	Brindisi	2	(0)
2023–	Akragas	0	(0)

International career
2004–2005	Italy U17	4	(0)
2005–2006	Italy U19	8	(0)
2005–2007	Italy U20	3	(0)
2007	Italy U21	3	(0)
- * Club domestic league appearances and goals as of 7 May 2023

Marco Rossi (Italian pronunciation: [ˈmarko ˈrossi]; born 30 September 1987) is an Italian footballer who plays as a defender for Serie D club Akragas.

== Club career ==
In July 2009, Parma exchanged Rossi with Antonio Mirante of Sampdoria, signing a season-long loan. On 24 June 2011, he was signed by Cesena in a co-ownership deal for €2 million after he spent a year with Bari. After the deal, Alberto Galuppo returned to Parma in July 2011 for €1 million.

In June 2012, the co-ownership was renewed. However, due to Rossi's involvement in the 2011 Italian football scandal, Parma gave up the remaining 50% registration rights for free. Rossi was banned for one year and eight months; thus, Cesena terminated his contract.

On 31 March 2014, Rossi was signed by Perugia. In January 2015, he was signed by Varese in a temporary deal.

On 9 August 2016, it was announced that Rossi signed for the A-League club Wellington Phoenix. After playing for the Phoenix for two seasons for 38 games including 37 starts, Rossi left the club at the end of his contract.

In July 2018, Rossi moved to Robur Siena in Serie C.

On 16 July 2019, he signed with Reggina.

On 31 August 2021, he was transferred to Seregno.
