= Daniele Gasparetto =

Italian footballer (born 1988)

Personal information
- Date of birth: 6 April 1988 (age 38)
- Place of birth: Montebelluna, Italy
- Height: 1.95 m (6 ft 5 in)
- Position: Defender

Team information
- Current team: ASD Sant'Agostino

Youth career
- –2005: Montebelluna
- 2004–2005: → Atalanta (loan)
- 2005–2007: Atalanta

Senior career*
Years	Team	Apps	(Gls)
2007–2010	Atalanta	0	(0)
2007–2008	→ Legnano (loan)	28	(0)
2008–2009	→ Modena (loan)	13	(1)
2009–2010	→ Padova (loan)	6	(0)
2010–2014	Cittadella	87	(7)
2014–2017	SPAL	79	(2)
2017–2019	Ternana	41	(2)
2019–2021	Reggina	28	(0)
2021–2023	Legnago Salus	51	(2)
2023–	ASD Sant'Agostino		

International career
2005	Italy U18	2	(0)
2006–2007	Italy U19	12	(0)
2007–2008	Italy U20	2	(0)
- * Club domestic league appearances and goals as of 7 May 2023

Daniele Gasparetto (born 6 April 1988) is an Italian footballer who plays as a defender for ASD Sant'Agostino.

== Club career ==
=== Atalanta ===
Born in Montebelluna, Veneto, Gasparetto spent his early career with hometown club Montebelluna until 2004. In 2007, he graduated from Primavera under-19 team of Atalanta BC and loaned to Serie C1 side Legnano.

In July 2008 he left for Serie B club Modena. In the next season he left for Serie B newcomer Padova.

=== Cittadella ===
In July 2010 he left for fellow Serie B team Cittadella along with Manolo Gabbiadini in co-ownership deal, for €500, as part of the deal that newly relegated Atalanta signed striker Matteo Ardemagni from Cittadella.

Coach Claudio Foscarini did not use the same starting line-up for the first few matches of the season. He started the first 2 matches of the season, the 2–0 won against Verona in 2010–11 Coppa Italia. and a 0–2 lost to Serie B newcomer PortoSummaga in the opening league match. In round 2, he lost his starting place to Andrea Manucci (who absent in round 1 and the cup) but in round 3, Gasparetto started in that lost 0–2 to Novara, as Francesco Scardina was absent. Eventually Gasparetto started 17 times in the league. In June 2011 the club bought Gasparetto outright and sold Gabbiadini back to Atalanta.

=== Reggina ===
On 31 January 2019 he signed a 2.5-year contract with Reggina.

=== Legnago ===
On 25 August 2021, he joined to Serie C club Legnago Salus.

== International career ==
Gasparetto capped for Azzurrini in 2007 UEFA European Under-19 Football Championship elite qualification. In February 2010, he was called up by Pierluigi Casiraghi to Italy U21 team for a training camp along with a few new faces, likes Giulio Donati. However, Gasparetto did not receive a call-up to the match in March 2010.
