= Ivan Lakićević =

Serbian footballer

Personal information
- Date of birth: 27 July 1993 (age 33)
- Place of birth: Belgrade, FR Yugoslavia
- Height: 1.80 m (5 ft 11 in)
- Position: Right-back

Team information
- Current team: Grafičar
- Number: 33

Youth career
- 1998–2001: FK Novi Beograd
- 2001–2011: Red Star Belgrade

Senior career*
Years	Team	Apps	(Gls)
2011–2015	Donji Srem	85	(2)
2015–2018	Vojvodina	87	(0)
2018–2021	Genoa	0	(0)
2019–2020	→ Venezia (loan)	18	(0)
2021–2022	Reggina	30	(0)
2023–2024	Železničar Pančevo	32	(2)
2024–2025	Novi Pazar	17	(2)
2025-	Grafičar	20	(0)

International career^{‡}
2011	Serbia U19	1	(0)
- * Club domestic league appearances and goals as of 14 May 2026 ‡ National team caps and goals as of 13 November 2023

Ivan "Mogli" Lakićević (Serbian Cyrillic: Иван Лакићевић; born 27 July 1993) is a Serbian footballer who plays as a right-back for Grafičar.

== Club career ==
He was playing for young categories of Red Star Belgrade. He was a member of Donji Srem from 2011 to 2015. In June 2015, Lakićević joined Vojvodina.

=== Genoa ===
On 2 July 2018, Lakićević signed with Italian Serie A club Genoa.

On 24 July 2019, Lakićević joined Serie B club Venezia on loan until 30 June 2020.

=== Reggina ===
On 19 January 2021, he signed a 1.5-year contract with Serie B club Reggina.

== Personal life ==
He is also known as "Mogli" (Mowgli) by a character from The Jungle Book. He is a big fan of R'n'R and heavy metal music.
