= Adriano Montalto =

Italian footballer (born 1988)

Personal information
- Date of birth: 6 April 1988 (age 38)
- Place of birth: Erice, Italy
- Height: 1.85 m (6 ft 1 in)
- Position: Forward

Team information
- Current team: Pistoiese

Senior career*
Years	Team	Apps	(Gls)
2007–2008	Messina	0	(0)
2007–2008	→ Scafatese (loan)	19	(1)
2008–2009	Lecco	26	(4)
2010–2011	Salernitana	12	(3)
2011–2012	Siracusa	15	(4)
2012	Ascoli	2	(0)
2012–2013	Latina	3	(0)
2013	→ Ascoli (loan)	5	(1)
2013–2014	Grosseto	13	(1)
2014–2015	Martina	37	(14)
2015–2016	Trapani	30	(3)
2016–2017	Juve Stabia	5	(1)
2017–2018	Ternana	34	(20)
2018–2020	Cremonese	12	(2)
2019–2020	→ Venezia (loan)	19	(3)
2020–2021	Bari	12	(4)
2021–2023	Reggina	47	(11)
2022–2023	→ Reggiana (loan)	22	(9)
2023	Reggiana	0	(0)
2023–2024	Casertana	27	(12)
2024–2025	Catania	17	(2)
2025	Reggina	7	(1)
2025–	Pistoiese	5	(0)
- * Club domestic league appearances and goals as of 28 February 2026

Adriano Montalto (born 6 April 1988) is an Italian footballer who plays for Serie D club Pistoiese.

== Biography ==
Born in Erice, Sicily, Montalto began his career with Messina. In summer 2007, he was signed by Serie C2 club Scafatese on a temporary deal. Montalto became a free agent after Messina's bankruptcy in July 2008. Montalto became a player of the third-tier club Lecco in 2008–09 Lega Pro Prima Divisione. Montalto did not play any game in the first half of the 2009–10 season. He was signed by Serie B club Salernitana in January 2010 in a 3 1/2-year contract. He wore no.11 shirt for the first team. However, he did not play any game in 2009–10 Serie B. The club was relegated to the third tier in 2010, where Montalto had played 12 times. In 2011, Salernitana went bankrupt. Montalto joined another third-tier club Siracusa in summer 2011. Montalto made 10 starts for the club until January 2012, when he was signed by Serie B club Ascoli.

On 24 August 2012 Montalto returned to the third tier for Latina. The club won promotion to Serie B at the end of season while Ascoli relegated from Serie B. Ascoli also re-signed Montalto on 22 January 2013 in temporary deal, with Andrea Giallombardo moved to Latina from Ascoli Piceno also in temporary deal.

On 2 September 2013, Montalto was signed by the third-tier club Grosseto, with Marco Crimi moving in the opposite direction in a temporary deal. On 10 January 2014 Montalto left for Lega Pro Seconda Divisione (4th tier) club Martina, which the club had to finish 8th or above in order to avoid relegation to Serie D, as the second division of Lega Pro would merge with the prime division of Lega Pro at the end of 2013–14 season, making the first three tier of Italian football were professional leagues only.

In 2015, he was signed by Trapani in a 1-year deal (with optional further years).

On 25 August 2016 he was signed by Juve Stabia.

On 28 August 2019, he joined Venezia on a season-long loan.

On 5 October 2020 he signed a two-year contract with Bari.

On 26 January 2021, he moved to Serie B club Reggina on a 1.5-year contract. On 1 September 2022, Montalto joined Reggiana on loan, with Reggiana holding an obligation to buy his rights in case of promotion to Serie B.

On 8 September 2023, Montalto joined Casertana.

On 28 August 2024, Montalto signed a two-season contract with Catania.
