= Nicolò Bianchi =

Italian footballer

Personal information
- Date of birth: 24 February 1992 (age 34)
- Place of birth: Como, Italy
- Height: 1.85 m (6 ft 1 in)
- Position: Midfielder

Youth career
- –2011: Novara

Senior career*
Years	Team	Apps	(Gls)
2011–2016	Novara	29	(1)
2011	→ Foggia (loan)	4	(0)
2012	→ Giulianova (loan)	12	(0)
2012–2013	→ Alessandria (loan)	18	(0)
2013–2014	→ Monza (loan)	6	(0)
2015–2016	→ Cremonese (loan)	30	(1)
2016–2018	Bassano	49	(4)
2018–2019	Vicenza	34	(4)
2019–2022	Reggina	97	(4)
2022–2023	Cesena	31	(0)
2023–2025	Padova	39	(3)
2025–2026	Arzignano	27	(0)
- * Club domestic league appearances and goals as of 30 April 2026

Nicolò Bianchi (born 24 February 1992) is an Italian professional footballer who plays as a midfielder.

== Career ==
Bianchi spent the first nine seasons of his senior career in the third-tier Serie C.

On 12 July 2019, he signed a two-year contract with Reggina. At the end of the 2019–20 season, Reggina were promoted to Serie B. Bianchi made his Serie B debut for Reggina on 26 September 2020, in a game against Salernitana, as a starter. On 14 June 2021, it was announced that he extended his contract with Reggina for another two years.

On 12 July 2022, Bianchi signed a two-year contract with Cesena.

On 28 August 2023, he moved to Padova on a two-year contract.
