= Christian Dalle Mura =

Italian footballer (born 2002)

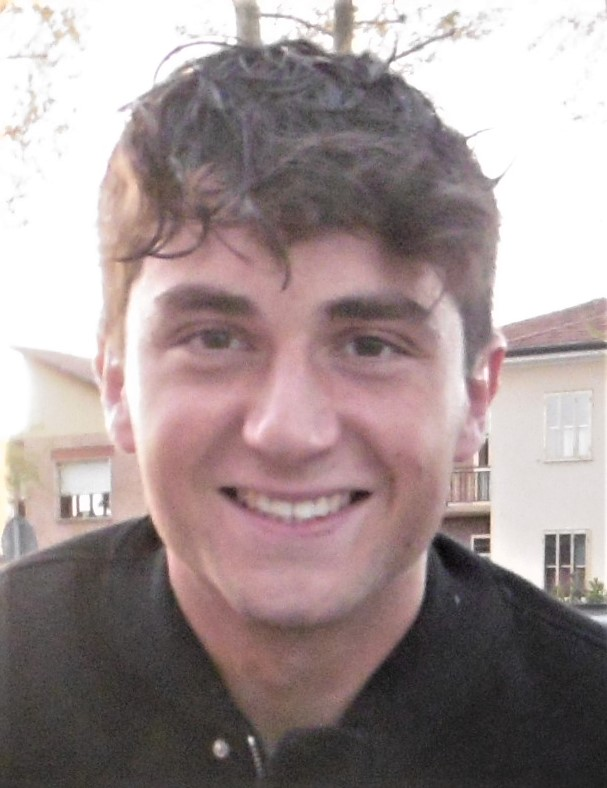

Personal information
- Full name: Christian Dalle Mura
- Date of birth: 2 February 2002 (age 24)
- Place of birth: Pietrasanta, Italy
- Height: 1.85 m (6 ft 1 in)
- Position: Centre-back

Team information
- Current team: Benevento

Youth career
- –2020: Fiorentina

Senior career*
Years	Team	Apps	(Gls)
2020–2024	Fiorentina	1	(0)
2021	→ Reggina (loan)	9	(0)
2021–2022	→ Cremonese (loan)	0	(0)
2022	→ Pordenone (loan)	17	(0)
2022–2023	→ SPAL (loan)	27	(0)
2024	→ Ternana (loan)	12	(0)
2024–2026	Cosenza	32	(0)
2026	Juve Stabia	15	(0)
2026–	Benevento	0	(0)

International career^{‡}
2018–2019	Italy U17	16	(0)
2019–2020	Italy U18	5	(1)
2020	Italy U19	1	(0)
2020–2022	Italy U20	4	(0)
- * Club domestic league appearances and goals as of 10 May 2026 ‡ National team caps and goals as of 30 June 2022

Christian Dalle Mura (born 2 February 2002) is an Italian professional footballer who plays as a centre-back for Serie B club Benevento.

== Club career ==
=== Fiorentina ===
Dalle Mura started his youth career at Juventus club in Viareggio in northern Tuscany. While there, he was spotted by Alberto Bernardeschi, father of Juventus and former Fiorentina winger Federico Bernardeschi, and had a successful trial with Fiorentina and immediately joined their youth team.

Dalle Mura was called up to the Fiorentina senior side for the first time when the club travelled to reigning champions Juventus on 2 February 2020, his 18th birthday. He did not feature as Fiorentina fell to a 0–3 defeat. He made his professional debut for Fiorentina as a last-minute substitute in the club's 3–1 victory over SPAL in the Serie A on 2 August 2020.

==== Loan to Reggina ====
On 22 January 2021, Dalle Mura joined Serie B side Reggina on loan for the remainder of the season.

==== Loan to Cremonese and Pordenone ====
On 20 August 2021, he went on loan to Cremonese in Serie B. Not finding space, on 4 January 2022, he returned to Fiorentina. On 6 January 2022, he joined Serie B club Pordenone on loan until the end of the season.

==== Loan to SPAL ====
On 30 June 2022, he went to Serie B side SPAL on loan until the end of the season.

==== Loan to Ternana ====
On 31 January 2024, Dalle Mura joined Serie B club Ternana on loan for the remainder of the season.

=== Cosenza ===
On 12 July 2024, Dalle Mura signed a three-season contract with Cosenza.

=== Juve Stabia ===
On 14 January 2026, Dalle Mura moved to Juve Stabia in Serie B on a one-and-a-half-year contract.

== International career ==
Dalle Mura was a member of the Italy U17 squad that finished as runners-up at the 2019 UEFA European Under-17 Championship. He started in the final on 19 May 2019 and picked up a yellow card as Italy fell 2–4 to the Netherlands at Tallaght Stadium in Dublin.

== Career statistics ==
As of match played 2 August 2020.

Appearances and goals by club, season and competition
Club	Season	League			Coppa Italia		Europe		Other		Total	
Club	Season	Division	Apps	Goals	Apps	Goals	Apps	Goals	Apps	Goals	Apps	Goals
Fiorentina	2019–20	Serie A	1	0	0	0	—				1	0
Fiorentina	2020–21	Serie A	0	0	0	0	—				0	0
Career total			1	0	0	0	0	0	0	0	1	0
