= Marco Crimi =

Italian footballer

Personal information
- Date of birth: 17 March 1990 (age 36)
- Place of birth: Messina, Italy
- Height: 1.78 m (5 ft 10 in)
- Position: Defensive midfielder

Team information
- Current team: Team Altamura
- Number: 8

Youth career
- Messina

Senior career*
Years	Team	Apps	(Gls)
2008–2009	Igea Virtus	25	(3)
2009–2011	Bari	3	(0)
2011	→ Grosseto (loan)	17	(0)
2011–2014	Grosseto	63	(0)
2013–2014	→ Latina (loan)	31	(2)
2014–2015	Latina	39	(2)
2015–2016	Bologna	1	(0)
2016	→ Carpi (loan)	19	(0)
2016–2017	Carpi	21	(1)
2017	→ Cesena (loan)	18	(2)
2017	Cesena	1	(0)
2017–2021	Virtus Entella	59	(2)
2018–2019	→ Spezia (loan)	22	(2)
2021	Reggina	16	(0)
2021–2023	Triestina	50	(3)
2023–2025	Trapani	35	(2)
2025	Messina	14	(1)
2025–	Team Altamura	21	(0)

International career
2011–2013	Italy U21	13	(0)
- * Club domestic league appearances and goals as of 1 May 2026

Marco Crimi (born 17 March 1990) is an Italian professional footballer who plays as a midfielder for Serie C Group C club Team Altamura. Earlier in his career, he played as a defensive midfielder, and a right-back. He is a former Italy under-21 international.

== Club career ==
Crimi was born in Messina, and started his career with hometown club Messina before joining Igea Virtus as a free agent. His form earned him a move to Serie A side Bari.

=== Bari ===
Crimi joined Serie A side Bari in 2009. He made his Bari debut in the Coppa Italia on 28 October 2010, in a 3–1 win against Torino. On 10 November 2010, he made his Serie A debut, replacing Alessandro Gazzi as a substitute in a match against ChievoVerona.

=== Grosseto ===
He earned a subsequent loan move to Grosseto on 31 January 2011. He made his debut in Serie B on 5 February 2011, in Grosseto's 1–0 loss to Novara. On 23 June 2011, Grosseto bought out 50% of his rights in a co-ownership deal, for a fee of €300,000. The co-ownership deal was renewed in June 2012.

After becoming a regular starter at Grosseto, Crimi was frozen out of the first team along with teammates Yaw Asante, Davis Curiale and Giovanni Formiconi all being in a car involved in an accident where the driver had been drink driving.

In June 2013, Grosseto acquired Crimi outright from Bari.

=== Latina ===
On 3 September 2013, Crimi joined Serie B side Latina on loan. His impressive form in the heart of the midfield, led Latina to an impressive 3rd-place finish in Serie B, after helping beat his former club Bari in two legs in the Serie B play-offs semi-final. Latina were undone 4–2 on aggregate by Cesena in the two legged final for promotion to Serie A.

In June 2014, Latina excised the option to sign Crimi outright.

=== Bologna ===
Crimi joined Bologna on 20 August 2015 for a €730,000 fee, with Daniele Paponi moving in the opposite direction for free. Crimi signed a reported three-year contract, worth €250,000 a year.

=== Carpi ===
On 4 January 2016, Serie A side Carpi had reached an agreement for the loan of Crimi until the end of the season, with a buyout option.

On 21 June 2016, Carpi announced that they had activated the buyout clause to sign Crimi on a two-year deal, for a fee of €500,000.

=== Cesena ===
On 31 January 2017, Crimi joined Cesena on a temporary deal, with an obligation to buy.

=== Virtus Entella ===
On 31 August 2017, Crimi was sold to fellow Serie B club Virtus Entella.

=== Reggina ===
On 29 January 2021 he joined Reggina on a one-and-a-half-year contract.

=== Triestina ===
On 31 August 2021, he moved to Triestina.

=== Trapani ===
After two Serie C seasons with Triestina, on 28 September 2023, Crimi joined Serie D club Trapani on a free transfer.

== International career ==
On 4 November 2011, he received his first call-up to the Italy U-21 squad by Ciro Ferrara for the double engagement with Turkey and Hungary in the qualifiers for the UEFA European Under-21 Championship. Becoming the first player in the history of Grosseto to play in the Under-21s.

On 27 May 2013, he was included in the 23-man squad for the European Under-21 Championship in Israel, where Italy finished in second place with Spain beating Italy 4–2 in the final on 18 June. Crimi made 3 appearances in the tournament.

== Honours ==
Italy U21

- 2013 UEFA European Under-21 Championship Runner-up
