= Gianluca Di Chiara =

Italian footballer (born 1993)

Personal information
- Date of birth: 26 December 1993 (age 32)
- Place of birth: Palermo, Italy
- Height: 1.85 m (6 ft 1 in)
- Position: Defender

Youth career
- 2003–2007: Parma
- 2007–2011: Reggiana

Senior career*
Years	Team	Apps	(Gls)
2010–2011	Reggiana	1	(0)
2011–2014	Palermo	0	(0)
2012–2013	→ Pavia (loan)	29	(1)
2013–2014	→ Latina (loan)	3	(0)
2014–2017	Catanzaro	24	(0)
2015	→ Lecce (loan)	8	(1)
2015–2016	→ Foggia (loan)	32	(0)
2016–2017	→ Perugia (loan)	40	(1)
2017	Perugia	0	(0)
2017–2020	Benevento	32	(0)
2018	→ Carpi (loan)	10	(0)
2019–2020	→ Perugia (loan)	24	(1)
2020–2022	Perugia	0	(0)
2020–2022	→ Reggina (loan)	66	(2)
2022–2023	Reggina	32	(0)
2023–2025	Parma	25	(0)
2025	Frosinone	4	(0)
2025–2026	Catanzaro	13	(0)
2026	Arezzo	5	(0)

International career
2011–2012	Italy U19	1	(0)
- * Club domestic league appearances and goals as of 30 April 2026

Gianluca Di Chiara (born 26 December 1993) is an Italian professional footballer who plays as a defender.

== Club career ==
=== Reggiana ===
Born in Palermo, Sicily, Di Chiara started his career at Emilian club Parma, and then Reggiana. He was a member of Reggiana's Allievi under-17 team in 2009–10 season. He made his first team debut in 2010–11 Coppa Italia Lega Pro and league debut in the last round of 2010–11 Lega Pro Prima Divisione.

=== Palermo ===
On 29 June 2011, his hometown club Palermo signed Di Chiara in co-ownership deal for €140,000 in a three-year contract. Di Chiara received call-up from Italy national under-19 football team during his stay with Palermo. In June 2012 Palermo bought Di Chiara outright for another €200,000, as well as adding two more year to the contract.

On 26 June 2012, he was signed by Pavia in a temporary deal which Pavia received €25,466 as premi di valorizzazione. On 9 July 2013, Di Chiara and Dario Maltese were signed by Latina.

=== Catanzaro ===
On 15 January 2014, Di Chiara was signed by Catanzaro in a temporary deal. On 22 July 2014, Catanzaro signed Di Chiara outright. On 22 January 2015, Di Chiara and Scuffia were signed by fellow Lega Pro club Lecce in temporary deals, with an option to purchase.

On 3 August 2015, he was signed by Foggia in a temporary deal. On 10 August 2016, Di Chiara left for Serie B club Perugia.

=== Benevento ===
==== Loan to Perugia ====
On 16 July 2019, he returned to Perugia on loan with an obligation to buy.

=== Reggina ===
On 23 September 2020, he joined Reggina on a two-year loan. On 12 August 2022, Di Chiara returned to Reggina on a permanent basis and signed a multi-year contract.

=== Parma ===
On 31 August 2023, Di Chiara signed a two-year contract with Parma. In 2024 he is promoted to Serie A with his team.

=== Frosinone ===
On 3 February 2025, Di Chiara moved to Serie B club Frosinone.

== Honours ==
Parma

- Serie B: 2023–24
