= Daniele Liotti (footballer) =

Italian footballer (born 1994)

Personal information
- Date of birth: 8 June 1994 (age 32)
- Place of birth: Vibo Valentia, Italy
- Height: 1.80 m (5 ft 11 in)
- Positions: Left-back; left midfielder

Team information
- Current team: Treviso
- Number: 94

Youth career
- Catanzaro
- Catania

Senior career*
Years	Team	Apps	(Gls)
2010–2011	Catanzaro	5	(0)
2012–2013	Cosenza	17	(0)
2013–2014	Brindisi	30	(0)
2014–2017	Juve Stabia	46	(1)
2017	→ Feralpisalò (loan)	9	(0)
2017–2018	Siracusa	27	(5)
2018–2020	Pisa	18	(0)
2020–2023	Reggina	80	(7)
2022	→ Cosenza (loan)	20	(2)
2024–2025	Avellino	32	(3)
2025	Trapani	5	(0)
2025–2026	Casertana	31	(2)
2026–	Treviso	0	(0)
- * Club domestic league appearances and goals as of 23 August 2026

Daniele Liotti (born 8 June 1994) is an Italian professional footballer who plays as a left-back and left-midfielder for Serie C Group A club Treviso.

== Club career ==
On 9 January 2020, Liotti signed a contract with Reggina until June 2022. On 11 January 2022, he returned to Cosenza on loan until the end of the season.
