= Giuseppe Loiacono =

Italian footballer

Personal information
- Date of birth: 6 October 1991 (age 35)
- Place of birth: Bari, Italy
- Height: 1.82 m (6 ft 0 in)
- Position: Defender

Team information
- Current team: Potenza
- Number: 6

Youth career
- –2010: Bari

Senior career*
Years	Team	Apps	(Gls)
2010–2011	Vigor Trani	32	(0)
2011–2012	Paganese	18	(0)
2012–2019	Foggia	191	(8)
2019–2023	Reggina	87	(2)
2023–2024	Crotone	33	(1)
2024–2026	Ternana	34	(0)
2026–	Potenza	7	(0)
- * Club domestic league appearances and goals as of 1 May 2026

Giuseppe Loiacono (born 6 October 1991) is an Italian professional footballer who plays as a defender for Serie C Group C club Potenza.

== Club career ==
Loiacono started his youth career with hometown club Bari. In 2010, he left Bari and joined Vigor Trani, where he remained until 2011. Paganese signed him in the same year. Loiacono would later transfer to Foggia in 2012.

He made his Serie C debut for Foggia on 30 August 2014, in a game against Martina Franca.

On 30 July 2019, Loiacono signed a three-year contract with Reggina.

On 31 August 2023, he joined Crotone on a two-year contract.

On 24 July 2024, Loiacono moved to Ternana on a two-year deal.
