= Stadio Oreste Granillo =

Football stadium in Reggio Calabria, Italy

Coordinates: 38°5′34″N 15°38′7″E

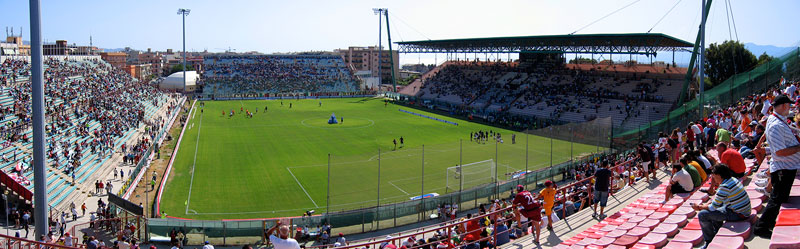
- Interactive map of Stadio Oreste Granillo
- Location: Reggio Calabria, Italy
- Owner: Municipality of Reggio Calabria
- Operator: LFA Reggio Calabria
- Capacity: 27,543
- Surface: Grass; 105m x 68m

Construction
- Groundbreaking: 1999
- Opened: 1999

Tenants
- AS Reggina 1914; Italy national football team (selected matches)

The Stadio Oreste Granillo is a football stadium in Reggio Calabria, Italy. It is the home of AS Reggina 1914. The stadium was built in 1999 on the foundations of Comunale and holds 27,763. It is named after former Reggina president Oreste Granillo (1926–1997) who led the club to Serie B for the first time and became mayor of the city.

== History ==
The stadium was first built in 1932, then known as the Stadio Michele Bianchi. Then-Reggina president Giuseppe Vilardi was behind its construction. For years it was the only stadium in the city and changed names many times, mainly known as the Comunale.

Many renovations have been made on the structure, with the cover over the grandstand being built in the 60's and the Curva Nord, where Reggina fans stand today being built in the 80s'. The curva was not part of the original structure.

In order to accommodate a growing number of fans, coinciding with the success achieved by Reggina, the stadium was substantially renovated. In 1997, the old structure was demolished and two years later the new Stadio Oreste Granillo was completed, completely rebuilt on the same surface where the Michele Bianchi was first constructed, almost 70 years earlier.

== Location ==
The stadium is located in the south of the city, only 1.8 km from the nearby railway station, Reggio Calabria Centrale. Upon leaving the station (Piazza Garibaldi), travel right along via Barlaam until you reach the entrance of the Calopinace bridge. From there, travel right along via Galileo Galilei which leads directly to the Granillo.

Those travelling from the Reggio Calabria Airport, can take advantage of the 102 bus line which, starting from the airport itself, leads straight to the station.

== International matches ==
Two international matches of the Italy national football team have taken place at the stadium:

Date	Opponent	Score	Stage	Attendance
26 April 2000	Portugal	2–0	Friendly	23,199
11 October 2003	Azerbaijan	4–0	UEFA Euro 2004 qualifying match	22,100
