= 2017–18 SPAL season =

SPAL
2017–18 season
- President: Walter Mattioli
- Manager: Leonardo Semplici
- Stadium: Stadio Paolo Mazza
- Serie A: 17th
- Coppa Italia: Fourth round
- Top goalscorer: League: Mirco Antenucci (11); All: Mirco Antenucci (11)
- Highest home attendance: 13,135 vs Juventus (17 March 2018, Serie A)
- Lowest home attendance: 4,000 vs Renate (12 August 2017, Coppa Italia)
- Average home league attendance: 12,067
Home colours	Away colours	Third colours

The 2017–18 season was SPAL's first season in the top-flight of Italian football since 1968. The team were promoted as champions of Serie B.

The club finished just above the relegation places, in 17th, securing a second season of Serie A football for the 2018–19 campaign; SPAL were eliminated in the fourth round of the Coppa Italia.

== Players ==
=== Squad information ===
As of 1 February 2018

Note: Flags indicate national team as defined under FIFA eligibility rules; some limited exceptions apply. Players may hold more than one non-FIFA nationality.

No.	Pos.	Nation	Player
1	GK	SEN	Alfred Gomis (on loan from Torino)
4	DF	POL	Thiago Cionek
5	DF	CRO	Lorenco Šimić (on loan from Sampdoria)
7	FW	ITA	Mirco Antenucci (captain)
9	FW	ITA	Federico Bonazzoli (on loan from Sampdoria)
10	FW	ITA	Sergio Floccari
12	DF	SWE	Pa Konate
14	MF	ITA	Federico Mattiello (on loan from Juventus)
15	DF	FIN	Sauli Väisänen
17	GK	ITA	Giacomo Poluzzi
18	MF	ITA	Eros Schiavon
19	MF	SVN	Jasmin Kurtić (on loan from Atalanta)
21	DF	POL	Bartosz Salamon (on loan from Cagliari)
22	FW	ITA	Marco Borriello

No.	Pos.	Nation	Player
23	DF	ITA	Francesco Vicari
24	MF	ITA	Mattia Vitale (on loan from Juventus)
25	MF	BRA	Everton Luiz
27	DF	BRA	Felipe
28	MF	ITA	Pasquale Schiattarella
29	MF	ITA	Manuel Lazzari
33	DF	ITA	Filippo Costa
43	FW	ITA	Alberto Paloschi (on loan from Atalanta)
77	MF	ITA	Federico Viviani (on loan from Hellas Verona)
85	DF	SEN	Boukary Dramé
88	MF	ITA	Alberto Grassi (on loan from Napoli)
92	GK	ITA	Gabriele Marchegiani
97	GK	ITA	Alex Meret (on loan from Udinese)

== Transfers ==
=== In ===
Date	Pos.	Player	Age	Moving from	Fee	Notes	Source
3 July 2017	DF	(Brazil) Felipe	32	(Italy) Udinese	Undisclosed		
21 July 2017	DF	(Finland) Sauli Väisänen	23	(Sweden) AIK	Undisclosed		
27 July 2017	DF	(Sweden) Pa Konate	23	(Sweden) Malmö FF	Undisclosed		
19 August 2017	FW	(Italy) Marco Borriello	35	(Italy) Cagliari	Undisclosed		
13 January 2018	DF	(Senegal) Boukary Dramé	32	(Italy) Atalanta	Undisclosed		
13 January 2018	DF	(Poland) Thiago Cionek	31	(Italy) Palermo	Undisclosed		
19 January 2018	MF	(Brazil) Everton Luiz	29	(Serbia) Partizan	Undisclosed		

==== Loans in ====
Date	Pos.	Player	Age	Moving from	Fee	Notes	Source
3 July 2017	MF	(Italy) Federico Mattiello	21	(Italy) Juventus	Loan		
3 July 2017	DF	(Greece) Marios Oikonomou	24	(Italy) Bologna	Loan	Loan with an obligation to buy	
3 July 2017	MF	(Italy) Luca Rizzo	25	(Italy) Bologna	Loan	Loan with an option to buy	
7 July 2017	FW	(Italy) Alberto Paloschi	27	(Italy) Atalanta	Loan	Loan with an option to buy	
7 July 2017	MF	(Italy) Federico Viviani	25	(Italy) Hellas Verona	Loan	Loan with an option to buy	
8 July 2017	GK	(Senegal) Alfred Gomis	23	(Italy) Torino	Loan		
27 July 2017	MF	(Italy) Alberto Grassi	22	(Italy) Napoli	Loan	Loan with an option to buy	
1 August 2017	GK	(Italy) Alex Meret	20	(Italy) Udinese	Loan	Second consecutive loan	
19 August 2017	DF	(Poland) Bartosz Salamon	26	(Italy) Cagliari	Loan	Loan with an option to buy	
22 August 2017	FW	(Italy) Federico Bonazzoli	20	(Italy) Sampdoria	Loan	Loan with an option to buy	
11 January 2018	MF	(Slovenia) Jasmin Kurtić	29	(Italy) Atalanta	Loan	Loan with an obligation to buy	

=== Out ===
Date	Pos.	Player	Age	Moving to	Fee	Notes	Source
11 January 2018	DF	(Greece) Marios Oikonomou	25	(Italy) Bologna	Loan return		
13 January 2018	MF	(Italy) Luca Rizzo	25	(Italy) Bologna	Loan return		

==== Loans out ====
Date	Pos.	Player	Age	Moving to	Fee	Notes	Source

== Competitions ==
=== Serie A ===
==== League table ====
Pos	Team	Pld	W	D	L	GF	GA	GD	Pts	Qualification or relegation
15	Bologna	38	11	6	21	40	52	−12	39	
16	Cagliari	38	11	6	21	33	61	−28	39	
17	SPAL	38	8	14	16	39	59	−20	38	
18	Crotone (R)	38	9	8	21	40	66	−26	35	Relegation to Serie B
19	Hellas Verona (R)	38	7	4	27	30	78	−48	25	Relegation to Serie B

Source: Serie A, Soccerway
Rules for classification: 1) Points; 2) Head-to-head points; 3) Head-to-head goal difference; 4) Goal difference; 5) Goals scored; 6) Draw.
(R) Relegated

==== Results summary ====
Overall								Home						Away					
Pld	W	D	L	GF	GA	GD	Pts	W	D	L	GF	GA	GD	W	D	L	GF	GA	GD
38	8	14	16	39	59	−20	38	5	8	6	22	29	−7	3	6	10	17	30	−13

Last updated: 20 May 2018.
Source: Competitive matches

==== Results by round ====
Round	1	2	3	4	5	6	7	8	9	10	11	12	13	14	15	16	17	18	19	20	21	22	23	24	25	26	27	28	29	30	31	32	33	34	35	36	37	38
Ground	A	H	A	H	A	H	H	A	H	A	H	A	H	A	A	H	A	H	A	H	A	H	A	H	A	A	H	A	H	A	H	A	H	H	A	H	A	H
Result	D	W	L	L	L	L	D	L	L	L	W	D	D	L	L	D	W	D	L	L	D	D	L	L	L	W	W	D	D	D	D	D	D	L	W	W	L	W
Position	13	7	8	14	14	14	15	18	19	19	17	16	17	17	18	18	17	17	17	17	18	18	18	18	18	18	17	18	17	17	17	17	17	18	17	14	17	17

Updated to match(es) played on 20 May 2018. Source: Competitive matches
A = Away; H = Home; W = Win; D = Draw; L = Loss

==== Matches ====
20 August 2017 1	Lazio	0–0	SPAL	Rome
20:45 CEST (UTC+02:00)	Luis Alberto (yellow card) 28'; Wallace (yellow card) 51'	Report	Borriello (yellow card) 75'; Viviani (yellow card) 90'	Stadium: Stadio Olimpico; Attendance: 25,000; Referee: Rosario Abisso

27 August 2017 2	SPAL	3–2	Udinese	Ferrara
20:45 CEST (UTC+02:00)	Borriello 25'; Lazzari 53'; Väisänen (yellow card) 76'; Viviani (yellow card) 85'; Salamon (yellow card) 90+1'; Rizzo 90+4'	Report	Nuytinck 72'; Pezzella (yellow card) 75'; Théréau 87' (pen.)	Stadium: Stadio Paolo Mazza; Attendance: 10,354; Referee: Paolo Valeri

10 September 2017 3	Internazionale	2–0	SPAL	Milan
12:30 CEST (UTC+02:00)	Icardi 27' (pen.); D'Ambrosio (yellow card) 30'; Gagliardini (yellow card) 58'; Perišić 87'	Report	Vicari (yellow card) 22'; Mora (yellow card) 45+3'	Stadium: San Siro; Attendance: 57,235; Referee: Claudio Gavillucci

17 September 2017 4	SPAL	0–2	Cagliari	Ferrara
15:00 CEST (UTC+02:00)	Mora (yellow card) 90+2'	Report	João Pedro (yellow card) 11', (goal) 68'; Barella 17', (yellow card) 78'; Capuano (yellow card) 60'	Stadium: Stadio Paolo Mazza; Attendance: 10,979; Referee: Eugenio Abbattista

20 September 2017 5	Milan	2–0	SPAL	Milan
20:45 CEST (UTC+02:00)	Rodríguez 26' (pen.); Kessié 61' (pen.); Romagnoli (yellow card) 89'	Report	Schiattarella (yellow card) 66'; Schiavon (yellow card) 88'	Stadium: San Siro; Attendance: 45,343; Referee: Rosario Abisso

23 September 2017 6	SPAL	2–3	Napoli	Ferrara
18:00 CEST (UTC+02:00)	Schiattarella 13', (yellow card) 67'; Salamon (yellow card) 39'; Viviani (yellow card) 53', (goal) 78'	Report	Insigne (yellow card) 9', (goal) 14'; Callejón 71'; Ghoulam 83'	Stadium: Stadio Paolo Mazza; Attendance: 12,650; Referee: Maurizio Mariani

1 October 2017 7	SPAL	1–1	Crotone	Ferrara
15:00 CEST (UTC+02:00)	Paloschi 39'; Felipe (yellow card) 84'; Schiattarella (yellow card) 88'	Report	Rohdén (yellow card) 35'; Nwankwo 59'	Stadium: Stadio Paolo Mazza; Attendance: 11,187; Referee: Paolo Mazzoleni

15 October 2017 8	Bologna	2–1	SPAL	Bologna
15:00 CEST (UTC+02:00)	Masina (yellow card) 26'; Poli 30'; Salamon 49' (o.g.); Pulgar (yellow card) 55'	Report	Borriello (yellow card) 70'; Antenucci 88'; Costa (yellow card) 90+1'	Stadium: Stadio Renato Dall'Ara; Attendance: 24,074; Referee: Marco Guida

22 October 2017 9	SPAL	0–1	Sassuolo	Ferrara
15:00 CEST (UTC+02:00)	Borriello (yellow card) 18'; Schiattarella (yellow card) 64'; Viviani (yellow card) 76'	Report	Politano 1'; Peluso (yellow card) 10'; Duncan (yellow card) 38'; Sensi (yellow card) 49'; Cassata (red card) 90'	Stadium: Stadio Paolo Mazza; Attendance: 10,338; Referee: Michael Fabbri

25 October 2017 10	Juventus	4–1	SPAL	Turin
20:45 CEST (UTC+02:00)	Bernardeschi 14'; Dybala 22'; Rugani (yellow card) 37'; Higuaín 65'; Cuadrado 70'	Report	Paloschi 34'	Stadium: Allianz Stadium; Attendance: 38,539; Referee: Fabrizio Pasqua

29 October 2017 11	SPAL	1–0	Genoa	Ferrara
15:00 CET (UTC+01:00)	Schiattarella (yellow card) 30'; Antenucci 56'; Felipe (yellow card) 59'; Borriello (yellow card) 87'; Schiavon (yellow card) 88'	Report	Pandev (yellow card) 73'; Rossettini (yellow card) 81'; Izzo (yellow card) 85'	Stadium: Stadio Paolo Mazza; Attendance: 12,100; Referee: Daniele Orsato

5 November 2017 12	Atalanta	1–1	SPAL	Bergamo
18:00 CET (UTC+01:00)	Cristante 23'; Freuler (red card) 69'	Report	Felipe (yellow card) 61'; Rizzo 63'; Mattiello (yellow card) 88'	Stadium: Stadio Atleti Azzurri d'Italia; Attendance: 17,042; Referee: Daniele Chiffi

19 November 2017 13	SPAL	1–1	Fiorentina	Ferrara
15:00 CET (UTC+01:00)	Borriello (yellow card) 40'; Paloschi 42'; Oikonomou (yellow card) 75' (yellow-red card) 90+1'; Viviani (yellow card) 90+2'	Report	Pezzella (yellow card) 28'; Benassi (yellow card) 60'; Sánchez (yellow card) 66'; Chiesa 80'	Stadium: Stadio Paolo Mazza; Attendance: 12,124; Referee: Gianpaolo Calvarese

25 November 2017 14	Chievo	2–1	SPAL	Verona
18:00 CET (UTC+01:00)	Inglese 66', 81'	Report	Cesar 17' (o.g.); Mora (yellow card) 81'	Stadium: Stadio Marc'Antonio Bentegodi; Attendance: 10,000; Referee: Ivano Pezzuto

1 December 2017 15	Roma	3–1	SPAL	Rome
18:30 CET (UTC+01:00)	Džeko 19'; Gonalons (yellow card) 22'; Strootman 32'; Pellegrini 53'	Report	Felipe (red card) 9'; Viviani 55'; Grassi (yellow card) 65'; Schiavon (yellow card) 83'	Stadium: Stadio Olimpico; Attendance: 35,609; Referee: Rosario Abisso

10 December 2017 16	SPAL	2–2	Hellas Verona	Ferrara
15:00 CET (UTC+01:00)	Viviani (yellow card) 13'; Borriello (yellow card) 53'; Salamon (yellow card) 82'; Paloschi 86'; Antenucci 88' (pen.)	Report	Büchel (yellow card) 22'; Cerci 55' (pen.); Cáceres 69', (yellow card) 90+2'	Stadium: Stadio Paolo Mazza; Attendance: 10,851; Referee: Gianluca Rocchi

17 December 2017 17	Benevento	1–2	SPAL	Benevento
18:00 CET (UTC+01:00)	Chibsah (yellow card) 37'; Letizia (yellow card) 51'; Cremonesi 59' (o.g.)	Report	Schiattarella (yellow card) 46'; Mattiello (yellow card) 58'; Floccari 64', 73'; Cremonesi (yellow card) 86'	Stadium: Stadio Ciro Vigorito; Attendance: 10,312; Referee: Fabrizio Pasqua

23 December 2017 18	SPAL	2–2	Torino	Ferrara
15:00 CET (UTC+01:00)	Cremonesi (yellow card) 23'; Vicari (yellow card) 38'; Viviani 42'; Schiattarella (yellow card) 45+2'; Antenucci 69' (pen.); Mora (yellow card) 90+2'	Report	Iago Falque 1', 10'; De Silvestri (yellow card) 35'; Nkoulou (yellow card) 62'	Stadium: Stadio Paolo Mazza; Attendance: 12,522; Referee: Paolo Valeri

30 December 2017 19	Sampdoria	2–0	SPAL	Genoa
15:00 CET (UTC+01:00)	Barreto (yellow card) 15'; Ramírez (yellow card) 39'; Sala (yellow card) 65'; Quagliarella 90+2' (pen.), 90+4'	Report	Viviani (yellow card) 13'; Vicari (yellow card) 72'; Schiattarella (yellow card) 77'; Mora (yellow card) 84'	Stadium: Stadio Luigi Ferraris; Attendance: 19,583; Referee: Luca Pairetto

6 January 2018 20	SPAL	2–5	Lazio	Ferrara
15:00 CET (UTC+01:00)	Antenucci 8' (pen.), 30'; Mattiello (yellow card) 40'; Vicari (yellow card) 75'	Report	Luis Alberto 5'; Immobile 19', 26', 41', 50'; Radu (yellow card) 53'; Milinković-Savić (yellow card) 54'; Luiz Felipe (yellow card) 71'	Stadium: Stadio Paolo Mazza; Attendance: 12,057; Referee: Paolo Tagliavento

21 January 2018 21	Udinese	1–1	SPAL	Udine
15:00 CET (UTC+01:00)	Samir 11'; Pezzella (yellow card) 42'; Danilo (yellow card) 82'	Report	Felipe (yellow card) 13'; Kurtić (yellow card) 45+4'; Floccari 49'; Viviani (yellow card) 58'	Stadium: Dacia Arena; Attendance: 17,944; Referee: Daniele Doveri

28 January 2018 22	SPAL	1–1	Internazionale	Ferrara
12:30 CET (UTC+01:00)	Paloschi 90', (yellow card) 90+3'	Report	Vicari 48' (o.g.)	Stadium: Stadio Paolo Mazza; Attendance: 13,098; Referee: Piero Giacomelli

4 February 2018 23	Cagliari	2–0	SPAL	Cagliari
15:00 CET (UTC+01:00)	Cigarini (yellow card) 9', (goal) 34'; Barella (yellow card) 17'; João Pedro (yellow card) 25'; Sau 78', (yellow card) 85'; Castán (yellow card) 90+1'	Report	Mattiello (yellow card) 8'; Vicari (yellow card) 58'	Stadium: Sardegna Arena; Attendance: 15,986; Referee: Davide Massa

10 February 2018 24	SPAL	0–4	Milan	Ferrara
15:00 CET (UTC+01:00)	Šimić (yellow card) 30'; Mattiello (yellow card) 51'; Schiattarella (yellow card) 70'	Report	Cutrone 2', 65'; Kessié (yellow card) 17'; Biglia (yellow card) 40', (goal) 73'; Bonucci (yellow card) 81'; Borini 90'	Stadium: Stadio Paolo Mazza; Attendance: 13,100; Referee: Maurizio Mariani

18 February 2018 25	Napoli	1–0	SPAL	Naples
15:00 CET (UTC+01:00)	Allan 6'; Hamšík (yellow card) 62'	Report	Kurtić (yellow card) 40'; Felipe (yellow card) 77'; Costa (yellow card) 83'; Salamon (yellow card) 84'	Stadium: Stadio San Paolo; Attendance: 34,270; Referee: Claudio Gavillucci

25 February 2018 26	Crotone	2–3	SPAL	Crotone
12:30 CET (UTC+01:00)	Sampirisi (yellow card) 26'; Budimir 49', 86'	Report	Vicari (yellow card) 30'; Antenucci 37'; Cionek (yellow card) 50'; Šimić 51'; Paloschi 60', (yellow card) 81'; Schiattarella (yellow card) 81'	Stadium: Stadio Ezio Scida; Attendance: 8,658; Referee: Daniele Orsato

3 March 2018 27	SPAL	1–0	Bologna	Ferrara
15:00 CET (UTC+01:00)	Lazzari (yellow card) 14'; Antenucci (yellow card) 36'; Mattiello (yellow card) 38' (yellow-red card) 90+3'; Felipe (yellow card) 43'; Grassi 48'	Report	González (red card) 10'; Džemaili (yellow card) 15'; Donsah (yellow card) 30'; Pulgar (yellow card) 72'	Stadium: Stadio Paolo Mazza; Attendance: 11,846; Referee: Gianluca Rocchi

11 March 2018 28	Sassuolo	1–1	SPAL	Reggio Emilia
15:00 CET (UTC+01:00)	Ragusa (yellow card) 17'; Babacar 31' (pen.); Peluso (yellow card) 35'; Mazzitelli (yellow card) 89'	Report	Antenucci 27'; Cionek (yellow card) 38'; Lazzari (yellow card) 57'; Grassi (yellow card) 88'	Stadium: Mapei Stadium – Città del Tricolore; Attendance: 11,589; Referee: Daniele Doveri

17 March 2018 29	SPAL	0–0	Juventus	Ferrara
20:45 CET (UTC+01:00)	Kurtić (yellow card) 32'; Schiattarella (yellow card) 60'; Costa (yellow card) 66'; Everton Luiz (yellow card) 85'	Report	Douglas Costa (yellow card) 69'; Pjanić (yellow card) 79'	Stadium: Stadio Paolo Mazza; Attendance: 13,135; Referee: Davide Massa

31 March 2018 30	Genoa	1–1	SPAL	Genoa
15:00 CEST (UTC+02:00)	Lapadula 30' (pen.); Rigoni (yellow card) 37'; Bertolacci (yellow card) 64'; Lazović (yellow card) 72'; Taarabt (yellow card) 88'	Report	Vicari (red card) 29'; Lazzari 60', (yellow card) 61'; Costa (yellow card) 71'	Stadium: Stadio Luigi Ferraris; Attendance: 19,853; Referee: Piero Giacomelli

7 April 2018 31	SPAL	1–1	Atalanta	Ferrara
18:00 CEST (UTC+02:00)	Cionek (yellow card) 30', (goal) 39'; Lazzari (yellow card) 54'; Kurtić (yellow card) 79'	Report	Petagna (yellow card) 42'; Freuler (yellow card) 75'; De Roon 78' (pen.)	Stadium: Stadio Paolo Mazza; Attendance: 12,906; Referee: Antonio Damato

15 April 2018 32	Fiorentina	0–0	SPAL	Florence
12:30 CEST (UTC+02:00)	Saponara (yellow card) 24'; Vitor Hugo (yellow card) 82'	Report	Everton Luiz (yellow card) 44'; Vitale (yellow card) 69'	Stadium: Stadio Artemio Franchi; Attendance: 29,651; Referee: Daniele Orsato

18 April 2018 33	SPAL	0–0	Chievo	Ferrara
20:45 CEST (UTC+02:00)	Vicari (yellow card) 15'	Report	Jaroszyński (yellow card) 41'; Gamberini (yellow card) 62'	Stadium: Stadio Paolo Mazza; Attendance: 12,436; Referee: Davide Massa

21 April 2018 34	SPAL	0–3	Roma	Ferrara
15:00 CEST (UTC+02:00)	Vicari (yellow card) 5'; Everton Luiz (yellow card) 12'; Schiattarella (yellow card) 40'; Grassi (yellow card) 90'	Report	Strootman (yellow card) 9'; Vicari 33' (o.g.); Nainggolan 52'; Schick 59'	Stadium: Stadio Paolo Mazza; Attendance: 12,955; Referee: Paolo Tagliavento

29 April 2018 35	Hellas Verona	1–3	SPAL	Verona
15:00 CEST (UTC+02:00)	Valoti 13'; Caracciolo (yellow card) 54'; Lee Seung-woo (yellow card) 86'	Report	Vicari (yellow card) 23'; Everton Luiz (yellow card) 34'; Fares 45+5' (o.g.); Cionek (yellow card) 56'; Felipe 71'; Kurtić 90+3'	Stadium: Stadio Marc'Antonio Bentegodi; Attendance: 19,233; Referee: Luca Banti

6 May 2018 36	SPAL	2–0	Benevento	Ferrara
15:00 CEST (UTC+02:00)	Vicari (yellow card) 12'; Paloschi 25'; Mattiello (yellow card) 73'; Antenucci 82' (pen.)	Report	Sandro (yellow card) 53'; Sparandeo (yellow card) 81'	Stadium: Stadio Paolo Mazza; Attendance: 11,900; Referee: Marco Guida

13 May 2018 37	Torino	2–1	SPAL	Turin
15:00 CEST (UTC+02:00)	Rincón (yellow card) 60'; Belotti 68'; Moretti (yellow card) 83'; De Silvestri 87'	Report	Grassi 22'; Schiavon (yellow card) 27'; Everton Luiz (yellow card) 66'; Cionek (yellow card) 68'; Kurtić (yellow card) 78'; Salamon (yellow card) 90+4'	Stadium: Stadio Olimpico Grande Torino; Attendance: 18,622; Referee: Maurizio Mariani

20 May 2018 38	SPAL	3–1	Sampdoria	Ferrara
18:00 CEST (UTC+02:00)	Antenucci 4' (pen.), 52'; Grassi 50'; Viviani (yellow card) 76'	Report	Caprari (yellow card) 2' (yellow-red card) 33'; Linetty (yellow card) 45'; Kownacki 65'; Quagliarella (yellow card) 74'	Stadium: Stadio Paolo Mazza; Attendance: 12,753; Referee: Marco Di Bello

=== Coppa Italia ===
12 August 2017 Third round	SPAL	1–0	Renate	Ferrara
20:30 CEST (UTC+02:00)	Vicari 28'; Oikonomou (yellow card) 34'; Cremonesi (yellow card) 38'; Schiattarella (yellow card) 80'	Report	Antezza (yellow card) 40'; Lunetta (yellow card) 50'; Simonetti (yellow card) 90+1'	Stadium: Stadio Paolo Mazza; Attendance: 4,000; Referee: Gianpaolo Calvarese

28 November 2017 Fourth round	SPAL	0–2	Cittadella	Ferrara
18:00 CET (UTC+01:00)	Oikonomou (yellow card) 66'	Report	Konate 13' (o.g.); Lora (yellow card) 47'; Schenetti 87'	Stadium: Stadio Paolo Mazza; Attendance: 4,110; Referee: Valerio Marini

== Statistics ==
=== Appearances and goals ===
No.	Pos	Nat	Player	Total		Serie A		Coppa Italia	
No.	Pos	Nat	Player	Apps	Goals	Apps	Goals	Apps	Goals
Goalkeepers
1	GK	(Senegal) SEN	Alfred Gomis	28	0	25+1	0	2	0
17	GK	(Italy) ITA	Giacomo Poluzzi	0	0	0	0	0	0
92	GK	(Italy) ITA	Gabriele Marchegiani	1	0	0+1	0	0	0
97	GK	(Italy) ITA	Alex Meret	13	0	13	0	0	0
Defenders
4	DF	(Poland) POL	Thiago Cionek	15	1	15	1	0	0
5	DF	(Croatia) CRO	Lorenco Šimić	6	1	3+3	1	0	0
12	DF	(Sweden) SWE	Pa Konate	2	0	0	0	2	0
15	DF	(Finland) FIN	Sauli Väisänen	9	0	6+1	0	1+1	0
21	DF	(Poland) POL	Bartosz Salamon	22	0	20+2	0	0	0
23	DF	(Italy) ITA	Francesco Vicari	35	1	34	0	1	1
27	DF	(Brazil) BRA	Felipe	30	1	30	1	0	0
30	DF	(Italy) ITA	Giacomo Boccafoglia	0	0	0	0	0	0
33	DF	(Italy) ITA	Filippo Costa	24	0	14+9	0	0+1	0
85	DF	(Senegal) SEN	Boukary Dramé	5	0	1+4	0	0	0
Midfielders
14	MF	(Italy) ITA	Federico Mattiello	31	0	24+5	0	1+1	0
18	MF	(Italy) ITA	Eros Schiavon	13	0	3+9	0	1	0
19	MF	(Slovenia) SVN	Jasmin Kurtić	16	1	16	1	0	0
24	MF	(Italy) ITA	Mattia Vitale	3	0	1+1	0	1	0
25	MF	(Brazil) BRA	Everton Luiz	11	0	7+4	0	0	0
28	MF	(Italy) ITA	Pasquale Schiattarella	33	1	22+9	1	2	0
29	MF	(Italy) ITA	Manuel Lazzari	38	2	36	2	0+2	0
77	MF	(Italy) ITA	Federico Viviani	30	3	29	3	1	0
88	MF	(Italy) ITA	Alberto Grassi	28	3	26+2	3	0	0
Forwards
7	FW	(Italy) ITA	Mirco Antenucci	34	11	28+5	11	1	0
9	FW	(Italy) ITA	Federico Bonazzoli	11	0	2+9	0	0	0
10	FW	(Italy) ITA	Sergio Floccari	21	3	9+11	3	1	0
22	FW	(Italy) ITA	Marco Borriello	16	1	9+6	1	1	0
43	FW	(Italy) ITA	Alberto Paloschi	37	7	25+11	7	1	0
Players transferred out during the season
2	DF	(Greece) GRE	Marios Oikonomou	6	0	2+2	0	2	0
6	DF	(Italy) ITA	Michele Cremonesi	7	0	4+1	0	2	0
11	MF	(Italy) ITA	Luca Rizzo	12	2	4+7	2	0+1	0
20	MF	(Italy) ITA	Luca Mora	19	0	10+7	0	2	0

Last updated: 20 May 2018
Source: Competitions

=== Goalscorers ===
Rank	No.	Pos	Nat	Name	Serie A	Coppa Italia	Total
1	7	FW	(Italy)	Mirco Antenucci	11	0	11
2	43	FW	(Italy)	Alberto Paloschi	7	0	7
3	10	FW	(Italy)	Sergio Floccari	3	0	3
3	77	MF	(Italy)	Federico Viviani	3	0	3
3	88	MF	(Italy)	Alberto Grassi	3	0	3
6	11	MF	(Italy)	Luca Rizzo	2	0	2
6	29	MF	(Italy)	Manuel Lazzari	2	0	2
8	4	DF	(Poland)	Thiago Cionek	1	0	1
8	5	DF	(Croatia)	Lorenco Šimić	1	0	1
8	19	MF	(Slovenia)	Jasmin Kurtić	1	0	1
8	22	FW	(Italy)	Marco Borriello	1	0	1
8	23	DF	(Italy)	Francesco Vicari	0	1	1
8	27	DF	(Brazil)	Felipe	1	0	1
8	28	MF	(Italy)	Pasquale Schiattarella	1	0	1
Own goal					2	0	2
Totals					39	1	40

Last updated: 20 May 2018

=== Clean sheets ===
Rank	No.	Pos	Nat	Name	Serie A	Coppa Italia	Total
1	1	GK	(Senegal)	Alfred Gomis	3	1	4
1	97	GK	(Italy)	Alex Meret	4	0	4
Totals					7	1	8

Last updated: 20 May 2018

=== Disciplinary record ===
No.	Pos	Nat	Name	Serie A			Coppa Italia			Total		
No.	Pos	Nat	Name	Booked	(yellow card) (yellow-red card)	Sent off (straight red)	Booked	(yellow card) (yellow-red card)	Sent off (straight red)	Booked	(yellow card) (yellow-red card)	Sent off (straight red)
2	DF	(Greece)	Marios Oikonomou	0	1	0	2	0	0	2	1	0
4	DF	(Poland)	Thiago Cionek	5	0	0	0	0	0	5	0	0
5	DF	(Croatia)	Lorenco Šimić	1	0	0	0	0	0	1	0	0
6	DF	(Italy)	Michele Cremonesi	2	0	0	1	0	0	3	0	0
15	DF	(Finland)	Sauli Väisänen	1	0	0	0	0	0	1	0	0
21	DF	(Poland)	Bartosz Salamon	5	0	0	0	0	0	5	0	0
23	DF	(Italy)	Francesco Vicari	10	0	1	0	0	0	10	0	1
27	DF	(Brazil)	Felipe	6	0	1	0	0	0	6	0	1
33	DF	(Italy)	Filippo Costa	4	0	0	0	0	0	4	0	0
14	MF	(Italy)	Federico Mattiello	6	1	0	0	0	0	6	1	0
18	MF	(Italy)	Eros Schiavon	4	0	0	0	0	0	4	0	0
19	MF	(Slovenia)	Jasmin Kurtić	5	0	0	0	0	0	5	0	0
20	MF	(Italy)	Luca Mora	5	0	0	0	0	0	5	0	0
24	MF	(Italy)	Mattia Vitale	1	0	0	0	0	0	1	0	0
25	MF	(Brazil)	Everton Luiz	5	0	0	0	0	0	5	0	0
28	MF	(Italy)	Pasquale Schiattarella	12	0	0	1	0	0	13	0	0
29	MF	(Italy)	Manuel Lazzari	4	0	0	0	0	0	4	0	0
77	MF	(Italy)	Federico Viviani	9	0	0	0	0	0	9	0	0
88	MF	(Italy)	Alberto Grassi	3	0	0	0	0	0	3	0	0
7	FW	(Italy)	Mirco Antenucci	1	0	0	0	0	0	1	0	0
22	FW	(Italy)	Marco Borriello	6	0	0	0	0	0	6	0	0
43	FW	(Italy)	Alberto Paloschi	2	0	0	0	0	0	2	0	0
Totals				97	2	2	4	0	0	101	2	2

Last updated: 20 May 2018
