= 2016–17 SPAL season =

Italian football results

SPAL
- Chairman: Walter Mattioli
- Head coach: Leonardo Semplici
- Stadium: Stadio Paolo Mazza
- Serie B: 1st
- Coppa Italia: Third round
- Top goalscorer: League: Mirco Antenucci (18); All: Mirco Antenucci (19)
Home colours	Away colours	Third colours

The 2016–17 season was SPAL's first season back in second division of the Italian football league, the Serie B, and the 110th as a football club.

== Players ==
=== First-team quad ===
As of 5 January 2017

Note: Flags indicate national team as defined under FIFA eligibility rules; some limited exceptions apply. Players may hold more than one non-FIFA nationality.

No.	Pos.	Nation	Player
1	GK	ITA	Alex Meret (on loan from Udinese)
2	DF	ITA	Daniele Gasparetto (vice-captain)
3	DF	ITA	Tommaso Silvestri
4	MF	ITA	Mariano Arini
5	DF	ITA	Nicolas Giani (captain)
6	DF	ITA	Michele Cremonesi
7	FW	ITA	Mirco Antenucci
10	FW	ITA	Sergio Floccari
11	FW	ITA	Mattia Finotto
12	GK	ITA	Gabriele Marchegiani
14	DF	ITA	Kevin Bonifazi (on loan from Torino)
17	FW	ITA	Gianmarco Zigoni (on loan from Milan)

No.	Pos.	Nation	Player
18	MF	ITA	Eros Schiavon
19	MF	ITA	Luca Mora
20	MF	ITA	Michele Castagnetti
21	MF	ITA	Simone Pontisso (on loan from Udinese)
22	GK	ITA	Giacomo Poluzzi
23	DF	ITA	Francesco Vicari
24	DF	ITA	Cristiano Del Grosso (on loan from Atalanta)
27	MF	ITA	Paolo Ghiglione (on loan from Genoa)
28	MF	ITA	Pasquale Schiattarella
29	MF	ITA	Manuel Lazzari
33	DF	ITA	Filippo Costa (on loan from Chievo)

== Pre-season and friendlies ==
Win Draw Loss

3 August 2016 Friendly	Perugia (Italy)	1–0	(Italy) SPAL	Italy
20:30 CEST (UTC+2)		Report

10 August 2016 Friendly	SPAL (Italy)	1–3	(Italy) Carpi	Italy
20:00 CEST (UTC+2)		Report

19 August 2016 Friendly	SPAL (Italy)	0–3	Iran	Forlì, Italy
16:00 CEST (UTC+2)		Report		Stadium: Stadio Tullo Morgagni

== Competitions ==
=== Overall record ===
Competition	First match	Last match	Starting round	Final position	Record							
Competition	First match	Last match	Starting round	Final position	Pld	W	D	L	GF	GA	GD	Win %
Serie B	27 August 2016	18 May 2017	Matchday 1	Winners	42	22	12	8	66	39	+27	52.38
Coppa Italia	7 August 2016	15 August 2016	Second round	Third round	2	1	0	1	3	5	−2	50.00
Total					44	23	12	9	69	44	+25	52.27

Source: Soccerway

=== Serie A ===
==== League table ====
Pos	Team	Pld	W	D	L	GF	GA	GD	Pts	Promotion, qualification or relegation
1	SPAL (C, P)	42	22	12	8	66	39	+27	78	Promotion to Serie A
2	Hellas Verona (P)	42	20	14	8	64	40	+24	74 (Note: Hellas Verona is ahead of Frosinone on head-to-head goal difference: Hellas Verona 2–0 Frosinone, Frosinone 1–0 Hellas Verona.)	Promotion to Serie A
3	Frosinone	42	21	11	10	57	42	+15	74	Qualification to promotion play-offs semi-finals
4	Perugia	42	15	20	7	54	40	+14	65 (Note: Perugia is ahead of Benevento on head-to-head points: Perugia 3–1 Benevento, Benevento 0–0 Perugia.)	Qualification to promotion play-offs semi-finals
5	Benevento (Note: Benevento was deducted one point.) (O, P)	42	18	12	12	56	42	+14	65	Qualification to promotion play-offs preliminary round

Source: Lega Serie B
Rules for classification: 1) Points; 2) Head-to-head points; 3) Head-to-head goal difference; 4) Goal difference; 5) Goals scored; 6) Draw.
(C) Champions; (O) Play-off winners; (P) Promoted

==== Results summary ====
Overall								Home						Away					
Pld	W	D	L	GF	GA	GD	Pts	W	D	L	GF	GA	GD	W	D	L	GF	GA	GD
42	22	12	8	66	39	+27	78	14	5	2	40	18	+22	8	7	6	26	21	+5

Source: Serie B

==== Results by round ====
Round	1	2	3	4	5	6	7	8	9	10	11	12	13	14	15	16	17	18	19	20	21	22	23	24	25	26	27	28	29	30	31	32	33	34	35	36	37	38	39	40	41	42
Ground	A	H	A	H	H	A	H	A	A	H	A	H	A	H	A	H	A	H	A	H	A	H	A	H	A	A	H	A	H	H	A	H	A	H	A	H	A	H	A	H	A	H
Result	L	W	D	D	L	L	W	W	D	W	L	W	W	W	D	D	W	W	L	W	D	W	D	D	W	D	W	W	D	W	W	L	L	W	W	W	W	W	D	D	L	W
Position	17	5	7	7	14	17	11	9	10	7	9	7	6	4	5	5	4	2	4	3	3	2	3	3	3	4	2	2	2	1	1	2	2	1	1	1	1	1	1	1	1	1

Source: Serie B
A = Away; H = Home; W = Win; D = Draw; L = Loss

==== Matches ====
The league fixtures were announced on 3 August 2016.

27 August 2016 1	Benevento	2–0	SPAL	Benevento
20:30 CEST (UTC+2)				Stadium: Stadio Ciro Vigorito

4 September 2016 2	SPAL	3–0	Vicenza	Ferrara
20:30 CEST (UTC+2)				Stadium: Stadio Paolo Mazza

10 September 2016 3	Ascoli	1–1	SPAL	Ascoli Piceno
15:00 CEST (UTC+2)				Stadium: Stadio Cino e Lillo Del Duca

17 September 2016 4	SPAL	2–2	Virtus Entella	Ferrara
15:00 CEST (UTC+2)				Stadium: Stadio Paolo Mazza

20 September 2016 5	SPAL	1–3	Hellas Verona	Ferrara
20:30 CEST (UTC+2)				Stadium: Stadio Paolo Mazza

26 September 2016 6	Perugia	1–0	SPAL	Perugia
20:30 CEST (UTC+2)				Stadium: Stadio Renato Curi

1 October 2016 7	SPAL	3–2	Salernitana	Ferrara
15:00 CEST (UTC+2)				Stadium: Stadio Paolo Mazza

9 October 2016 8	Pisa	0–1	SPAL	Pisa
15:00 CEST (UTC+2)				Stadium: Arena Garibaldi

14 October 2016 9	Cesena	1–1	SPAL	Cesena
20:30 CEST (UTC+2)				Stadium: Stadio Dino Manuzzi

22 October 2016 10	SPAL	3–1	Carpi	Ferrara
15:00 CEST (UTC+2)				Stadium: Stadio Paolo Mazza

25 October 2016 11	Frosinone	2–1	SPAL	Frosinone
20:30 CEST (UTC+2)				Stadium: Stadio Benito Stirpe

31 October 2016 12	SPAL	3–0	Avellino	Ferrara
20:30 CEST (UTC+2)				Stadium: Stadio Paolo Mazza

5 November 2016 13	Novara	0–1	SPAL	Novara
				Stadium: Stadio Silvio Piola

12 November 2016 14	SPAL	3–2	Brescia	Ferrara
				Stadium: Stadio Paolo Mazza

21 November 2016 15	Trapani	1–1	SPAL	Erice
				Stadium: Stadio Polisportivo Provinciale

26 November 2016 16	SPAL	0–0	Latina	Ferrara
				Stadium: Stadio Paolo Mazza

3 December 2016 17	Cittadella	1–2	SPAL	Cittadella
				Stadium: Stadio Pier Cesare Tombolato

10 December 2016 18	SPAL	2–1	Spezia	Ferrara
				Stadium: Stadio Paolo Mazza

17 December 2016 19	Pro Vercelli	3–1	SPAL	Vercelli
				Stadium: Stadio Silvio Piola (Vercelli)

24 December 2016 19	SPAL	4–0	Ternana	Ferrara
				Stadium: Stadio Paolo Mazza

29 December 2016 21	Bari	1–1	SPAL	Bari
				Stadium: Stadio San Nicola

21 January 2017 22	SPAL	2–0	Benevento	Ferrara
				Stadium: Stadio Paolo Mazza

28 January 2017 23	Vicenza	1–1	SPAL	Vicenza
				Stadium: Stadio Romeo Menti

4 February 2017 24	SPAL	1–1	Ascoli	Ferrara
				Stadium: Stadio Paolo Mazza

11 February 2017 25	Virtus Entella	0–3	SPAL	Chiavari
				Stadium: Stadio Comunale

20 February 2017 26	Hellas Verona	0–0	SPAL	Verona
				Stadium: Stadio Marcantonio Bentegodi

25 February 2017 27	SPAL	2–0	Perugia	Ferrara
				Stadium: Stadio Paolo Mazza

28 February 2017 28	Salernitana	1–2	SPAL	Salerno
				Stadium: Stadio Arechi

4 March 2017 29	SPAL	1–1	Pisa	Ferrara
				Stadium: Stadio Paolo Mazza

11 March 2017 30	SPAL	2–0	Cesena	Ferrara
				Stadium: Stadio Paolo Mazza

18 March 2017 31	Carpi	1–4	SPAL	Carpi
				Stadium: Stadio Sandro Cabassi

26 March 2017 32	SPAL	0–2	Frosinone	Ferrara
				Stadium: Stadio Paolo Mazza

31 March 2017 33	Avellino	1–0	SPAL	Avellino
				Stadium: Stadio Partenio-Adriano Lombardi

4 April 2017 34	SPAL	2–0	Novara	Ferrara
				Stadium: Stadio Paolo Mazza

9 April 2017 35	Brescia	1–3	SPAL	Brescia
				Stadium: Stadio Mario Rigamonti

17 April 2017 36	SPAL	2–1	Trapani	Ferrara
				Stadium: Stadio Paolo Mazza

22 April 2017 37	Latina	1–2	SPAL	Latina
				Stadium: Stadio Domenico Francioni

25 April 2017 38	SPAL	2–1	Cittadella	Ferrara
				Stadium: Stadio Paolo Mazza

29 April 2017 39	Spezia	0–0	SPAL	La Spezia
				Stadium: Stadio Alberto Picco

7 May 2017 40	SPAL	0–0	Pro Vercelli	Ferrara
				Stadium: Stadio Paolo Mazza

13 May 2017 41	Ternana	2–1	SPAL	Terni
				Stadium: Stadio Libero Liberati

18 May 2017 42	SPAL	2–1	Bari	Ferrara
				Stadium: Stadio Paolo Mazza

=== Coppa Italia ===
7 August 2016 Second round	SPAL	2–0	Messina	Forlì
18:30 CEST (UTC+2)	Antenucci 21'; Cerri 63'	Report		Stadium: Tullo Morgagni; Attendance: 1,036; Referee: Lorenzo Illuzzi

15 August 2016 Third round	Cagliari	5–1	SPAL	Cagliari
21:00 CEST (UTC+2)	Borriello 24', 44', 65', 83'; Sau 40'		Antenucci 85'	Stadium: Stadio Sant'Elia; Attendance: 6,200; Referee: Davide Ghersini
