= 2018–19 SPAL season =

SPAL
2018–19 season
- President: Walter Mattioli
- Manager: Leonardo Semplici
- Stadium: Stadio Paolo Mazza
- Serie A: 13th
- Coppa Italia: Fourth round
- Top goalscorer: League: Andrea Petagna (16); All: Andrea Petagna (17)
- Highest home attendance: 16,146 vs Milan (26 May 2019, Serie A)
- Lowest home attendance: 11,882 vs Chievo (16 December 2018, Serie A)
- Average home league attendance: 13,924
Home colours	Away colours	Third colours

The 2018–19 season was SPAL's second season in the top-flight of Italian football since 1968. After being promoted as champions of Serie B in the 2016–17 season, SPAL finished just above the relegation places in 17th during the 2017–18 season.

The season was coach Leonardo Semplici's fifth in charge of the club, after taking over in December 2014. On 3 July Semplici extended his contract with SPAL to 2020, with the option for a further year.

== Players ==
=== Squad information ===
As of 26 May 2019

No.	Name	Nat	Position(s)	Date of birth (age)	Signed from	Signed in	Contract ends	Apps.	Goals	Notes
Goalkeepers
1	Alfred Gomis	(Senegal)	GK	5 September 1993 (aged 25)	(Italy) Torino	2017	2021	46	0	
2	Emiliano Viviano	(Italy)	GK	1 December 1985 (aged 33)	(Portugal) Sporting CP	2019	2019	17	0	
17	Giacomo Poluzzi	(Italy)	GK	25 February 1988 (aged 31)	(Italy) Fidelis Andria	2017	2019	1	0	
32	Vanja Milinković-Savić	(Serbia)	GK	20 February 1997 (aged 22)	(Italy) Torino	2018	2019	2	0	Loan
Defenders
4	Thiago Cionek	(Poland)	CB	21 April 1986 (aged 33)	(Italy) Palermo	2018	2020	46	1	
5	Lorenco Šimić	(Croatia)	CB	15 July 1996 (aged 22)	(Italy) Sampdoria	2018	2019	14	1	Loan
13	Vasco Regini	(Italy)	LB / CB	9 September 1990 (aged 28)	(Italy) Sampdoria	2019	2019	4	0	
14	Kevin Bonifazi	(Italy)	CB	19 May 1996 (aged 23)	(Italy) Torino	2018	2019	26	2	Loan
23	Francesco Vicari	(Italy)	CB	3 August 1994 (aged 24)	(Italy) Novara	2016	2022	96	3	
24	Lorenzo Dickmann	(Italy)	RB / RWB	24 September 1996 (aged 22)	(Italy) Novara	2018	2019	6	0	Loan
27	Felipe	(Brazil)	CB	31 July 1984 (aged 34)	(Italy) Udinese	2017	2020	60	4	
33	Filippo Costa	(Italy)	LB / LM	21 May 1995 (aged 24)	(Italy) Chievo	2017	2021	47	2	
Midfielders
6	Simone Missiroli	(Italy)	CM	23 May 1986 (aged 33)	(Italy) Sassuolo	2018	2021	34	0	
8	Mattia Valoti	(Italy)	CM / AM	6 September 1993 (aged 25)	(Italy) Hellas Verona	2018	2019	24	2	Loan
11	Alessandro Murgia	(Italy)	CM / AM	9 August 1996 (aged 22)	(Italy) Lazio	2019	2019	15	0	Loan
16	Mirko Valdifiori	(Italy)	DM	21 April 1986 (aged 33)	(Italy) Torino	2018	2020	15	0	
19	Jasmin Kurtić	(Slovenia)	CM	10 January 1989 (aged 30)	(Italy) Atalanta	2018	2021	46	7	
28	Pasquale Schiattarella	(Italy)	CM	30 May 1987 (aged 32)	(Italy) Latina	2016	2020	95	4	
29	Manuel Lazzari	(Italy)	RM / RWB	29 November 1993 (aged 25)	(Italy) Giacomense	2013	2023	198	3	
93	Mohamed Fares	(Algeria)	LM / LWB / LW	15 February 1996 (aged 23)	(Italy) Hellas Verona	2018	2019	35	3	Loan
Forwards
7	Mirco Antenucci	(Italy)	ST / SS	8 September 1984 (aged 34)	(England) Leeds United	2016	2020	105	34	Captain
10	Sergio Floccari	(Italy)	ST	12 November 1981 (aged 37)	(Italy) Bologna	2017	2019	59	13	
37	Andrea Petagna	(Italy)	ST	30 June 1995 (aged 24)	(Italy) Atalanta	2018	2019	36	16	Loan
43	Alberto Paloschi	(Italy)	ST	4 January 1990 (aged 29)	(Italy) Atalanta	2017	2021	59	9	
45	Lazar Nikolić	(Serbia)	LW	1 August 1999 (aged 19)	(Serbia) Partizan	2018	2019	0	0	
95	Marko Janković	(Montenegro)	LW	9 July 1995 (aged 23)	(Serbia) Partizan	2019	2022	4	0	
Players transferred during the season
3	Johan Djourou	(Switzerland)	CB	18 January 1987 (aged 32)	(Turkey) Antalyaspor	2018	2019	5	0	
11	Gabriele Moncini	(Italy)	ST	26 April 1996 (aged 23)	(Italy) Cesena	2018	2022	1	0	
15	Sauli Väisänen	(Finland)	CB	5 June 1994 (aged 25)	(Sweden) AIK	2017	2020	7	0	Out on loan
21	Salvatore Esposito	(Italy)	CM	7 October 2000 (aged 18)	(Italy) Youth Sector	2018	–	0	0	
22	Demba Thiam	(Senegal)	GK	9 March 1998 (aged 21)	(Italy) Youth Sector	2017	2020	0	0	
25	Everton Luiz	(Brazil)	DM	24 May 1988 (aged 31)	(Serbia) Partizan	2018	2020	21	0	
77	Federico Viviani	(Italy)	DM	24 March 1992 (aged 27)	(Italy) Hellas Verona	2017	2022	29	3	
90	Jacopo Murano	(Italy)	ST	14 February 1991 (aged 28)	(Italy) Savona	2017	2019	0	0	
97	Mattia Vitale	(Italy)	CM	1 October 1997 (aged 21)	(Italy) Juventus	2017	2020	2	0	

== Transfers ==
=== In ===
Date	Pos.	Player	Age	Moving from	Fee	Notes	Source
18 June 2018	MF	(Italy) Federico Viviani	26	(Italy) Hellas Verona	Undisclosed	Option to buy exercised	
20 June 2018	GK	(Senegal) Alfred Gomis	24	(Italy) Torino	Undisclosed	Option to buy exercised	
20 June 2018	MF	(Slovenia) Jasmin Kurtić	29	(Italy) Atalanta	Undisclosed	Option to buy exercised	
20 June 2018	FW	(Italy) Alberto Paloschi	28	(Italy) Atalanta	Undisclosed	Option to buy exercised	
20 June 2018	DF	(Poland) Bartosz Salamon	27	(Italy) Cagliari	Undisclosed	Option to buy exercised	
21 July 2018	DF	(Switzerland) Johan Djourou	31	(Turkey) Antalyaspor	Free	One-year contract with the option for a second year	
16 August 2018	MF	(Italy) Mirko Valdifiori	32	(Italy) Torino	Undisclosed		
17 August 2018	MF	(Italy) Simone Missiroli	32	(Italy) Sassuolo	Undisclosed		

==== Loans in ====
Date	Pos.	Player	Age	Moving from	Fee	Notes	Source
18 June 2018	DF	(Algeria) Mohamed Fares	22	(Italy) Hellas Verona	Loan	Loan with an obligation to buy	
28 June 2018	DF	(Italy) Lorenzo Dickmann	21	(Italy) Novara	Loan	Loan with an obligation to buy if SPAL avoid relegation	
4 July 2018	GK	(Serbia) Vanja Milinković-Savić	21	(Italy) Torino	Loan		
6 July 2018	MF	(Italy) Mattia Valoti	24	(Italy) Hellas Verona	Loan	Loan with an obligation to buy under unspecified conditions	
19 July 2018	FW	(Italy) Andrea Petagna	23	(Italy) Atalanta	Loan	Loan with an obligation to buy under unspecified conditions	
16 August 2018	DF	(Italy) Kevin Bonifazi	22	(Italy) Torino	Loan	Loan with an option to buy and counter-option	
16 August 2018	DF	(Croatia) Lorenco Šimić	25	(Italy) Sampdoria	Loan	Loan with an option to buy and counter-option	
30 January 2019	MF	(Italy) Alessandro Murgia	22	(Italy) Lazio		On loan until June 2019	

=== Out ===
Date	Pos.	Player	Age	Moving to	Fee	Notes	Source
1 July 2018	FW	(Italy) Federico Bonazzoli	21	(Italy) Sampdoria	Loan return		
1 July 2018	DF	(Senegal) Boukary Dramé	32	Unattached	Free	End of contract	
1 July 2018	MF	(Italy) Alberto Grassi	23	(Italy) Napoli	Loan return		
1 July 2018	MF	(Italy) Federico Mattiello	22	(Italy) Atalanta	Loan return		
1 July 2018	GK	(Italy) Alex Meret	21	(Italy) Udinese	Loan return		
1 July 2018	MF	(Italy) Eros Schiavon	35	Unattached	Free	End of contract	
1 July 2018	DF	(Croatia) Lorenco Šimić	21	(Italy) Sampdoria	Loan return		
5 July 2018	FW	(Italy) Marco Borriello	36	Unattached	Free	Contract terminated by mutual consent	

==== Loans out ====
Date	Pos.	Player	Age	Moving to	Fee	Notes	Source
9 August 2018	DF	(Poland) Bartosz Salamon	27	(Italy) Frosinone	Loan	Loan with an obligation to buy	

== Competitions ==
=== Serie A ===
==== League table ====
Pos	Team	Pld	W	D	L	GF	GA	GD	Pts
11	Sassuolo	38	9	16	13	53	60	−7	43
12	Udinese	38	11	10	17	39	53	−14	43
13	SPAL	38	11	9	18	44	56	−12	42
14	Parma	38	10	11	17	41	61	−20	41 (Note: Positions determined by head-to-head points: Parma: 9 pts; Cagliari: 7 pts; Fiorentina: 1 pt.)
15	Cagliari	38	10	11	17	36	54	−18	41

Source: Serie A, Soccerway
Rules for classification: 1) Points; 2) Head-to-head points; 3) Head-to-head goal difference; 4) Goal difference; 5) Goals scored; 6) Draw. (Note: Head-to-head record is used only after all the matches between the teams in question have been played).

==== Results summary ====
Overall								Home						Away					
Pld	W	D	L	GF	GA	GD	Pts	W	D	L	GF	GA	GD	W	D	L	GF	GA	GD
38	11	9	18	44	55	−11	42	5	7	7	20	26	−6	6	2	11	24	29	−5

Last updated: 26 May 2019.
Source: Competitive matches

==== Results by round ====
Round	1	2	3	4	5	6	7	8	9	10	11	12	13	14	15	16	17	18	19	20	21	22	23	24	25	26	27	28	29	30	31	32	33	34	35	36	37	38
Ground	A	H	A	H	A	H	A	H	A	H	A	H	A	H	A	H	A	H	A	H	A	H	A	H	A	H	A	H	A	H	A	H	A	H	A	H	A	H
Result	W	W	L	W	L	L	L	L	W	L	L	D	L	D	D	D	L	D	L	D	W	D	L	L	D	L	L	W	W	W	L	W	W	D	W	L	L	L
Position	7	3	4	2	6	8	13	14	13	15	15	15	15	15	16	16	16	15	16	16	14	14	14	16	16	16	16	15	15	15	16	13	13	13	11	11	11	13

Updated to match(es) played on 26 May 2019. Source: Competitive matches
A = Away; H = Home; W = Win; D = Draw; L = Loss

==== Matches ====
19 August 2018 1	Bologna	0–1	SPAL	Bologna
20:30 CEST (UTC+02:00)	Pulgar (yellow card) 20'; Mattiello (yellow card) 64'; Nagy (yellow card) 68' (yellow-red card) 90'	Report	Fares (yellow card) 45+1'; Kurtić 71'; Felipe (yellow card) 82'	Stadium: Stadio Renato Dall'Ara; Attendance: 21,158; Referee: Piero Giacomelli

26 August 2018 2	SPAL	1–0	Parma	Bologna
18:00 CEST (UTC+02:00)	Kurtić (yellow card) 6'; Antenucci 49'; Schiattarella (yellow card) 61'; Lazzari (yellow card) 70'; Felipe (yellow card) 71'; Petagna (yellow card) 72'	Report	Štulac (yellow card) 69'; Barillà (yellow card) 73'	Stadium: Stadio Renato Dall'Ara; Attendance: 7,000; Referee: Daniele Orsato
Note: Match played at the Stadio Renato Dall'Ara due to ongoing construction work on the Stadio Paolo Mazza.

2 September 2018 3	Torino	1–0	SPAL	Turin
20:30 CEST (UTC+02:00)	Nkoulou 52'; Moretti (yellow card) 55'	Report	Schiattarella (yellow card) 27'; Cionek (yellow card) 71'	Stadium: Stadio Olimpico Grande Torino; Attendance: 17,785; Referee: Fabrizio Pasqua

17 September 2018 4	SPAL	2–0	Atalanta	Ferrara
20:30 CEST (UTC+02:00)	Petagna (yellow card) 40', (goal) 50', 56'; Felipe (yellow card) 60'; Everton Luiz (yellow card) 90+4'	Report	Freuler (yellow card) 6'; Rigoni (yellow card) 36'; Gosens (yellow card) 49'; De Roon (yellow card) 64'; Iličić (yellow card) 90+4'	Stadium: Stadio Paolo Mazza; Attendance: 14,153; Referee: Maurizio Mariani

22 September 2018 5	Fiorentina	3–0	SPAL	Florence
18:00 CEST (UTC+02:00)	Pjaca 18'; Milenković 28'; Biraghi (yellow card) 33'; Chiesa 56'	Report	Schiattarella (yellow card) 55'; Kurtić (yellow card) 74'	Stadium: Stadio Artemio Franchi; Attendance: 30,068; Referee: Davide Ghersini

27 September 2018 6	SPAL	0–2	Sassuolo	Ferrara
19:00 CEST (UTC+02:00)	Kurtić (yellow card) 66'	Report	Adjapong 59'; Matri 90'	Stadium: Stadio Paolo Mazza; Attendance: 13,945; Referee: Eugenio Abbattista

1 October 2018 7	Sampdoria	2–1	SPAL	Genoa
20:30 CEST (UTC+02:00)	Linetty 25'; Ekdal (yellow card) 40'; Murru (yellow card) 49'; Defrel 60'; Praet (yellow card) 70'	Report	Paloschi 21'; Felipe (yellow card) 37'; Everton Luiz (yellow card) 40'; Petagna (yellow card) 90'	Stadium: Stadio Luigi Ferraris; Attendance: 17,885; Referee: Federico La Penna

7 October 2018 8	SPAL	1–2	Internazionale	Ferrara
20:30 CEST (UTC+02:00)	Lazzari (yellow card) 31'; Valoti (yellow card) 50'; Missiroli (yellow card) 53'; Paloschi 72'; Schiattarella (yellow card) 84'; Everton Luiz (yellow card) 86'; Felipe (yellow card) 86'	Report	Icardi 14', 78'; Vrsaljko (yellow card) 52'; Miranda (yellow card) 80'	Stadium: Stadio Paolo Mazza; Attendance: 15,750; Referee: Fabio Maresca

20 October 2018 9	Roma	0–2	SPAL	Rome
15:00 CEST (UTC+02:00)	Lu. Pellegrini (yellow card) 37'; Ünder (yellow card) 62'; Fazio (yellow card) 82'	Report	Missiroli (yellow card) 30'; Petagna 38' (pen.); Bonifazi 56'; Paloschi (yellow card) 64'; Everton Luiz (yellow card) 69'; Milinković-Savić (yellow card) 75' (yellow-red card) 75'	Stadium: Stadio Olimpico; Attendance: 39,838; Referee: Luca Pairetto

28 October 2018 10	SPAL	0–3	Frosinone	Ferrara
15:00 CET (UTC+01:00)	Fares (yellow card) 27'; Lazzari (yellow card) 39'; Schiattarella (yellow card) 49'	Report	Maiello (yellow card) 25'; Chibsah (yellow card) 34', (goal) 40'; Ciano (yellow card) 45+3', (goal) 53'; Sportiello (yellow card) 82'; Campbell (yellow card) 86'; Pinamonti 89', (yellow card) 90'	Stadium: Stadio Paolo Mazza; Attendance: 13,676; Referee: Daniele Chiffi

4 November 2018 11	Lazio	4–1	SPAL	Rome
12:30 CET (UTC+01:00)	Acerbi (yellow card) 19'; Immobile 26', 35'; Cataldi 59'; Parolo 70'	Report	Antenucci 28'; Everton Luiz (yellow card) 57'; Felipe (yellow card) 69'; Cionek (yellow card) 76'	Stadium: Stadio Olimpico; Attendance: 28,000; Referee: Marco Guida

10 November 2018 12	SPAL	2–2	Cagliari	Ferrara
18:00 CET (UTC+01:00)	Petagna 3'; Valdifiori (yellow card) 34'; Felipe (yellow card) 43'; Antenucci 71'	Report	Barella (yellow card) 8'; Castro (yellow card) 17'; Pavoletti 73'; Ioniță 76', (yellow card) 90+5'; Sau (yellow card) 90'	Stadium: Stadio Paolo Mazza; Attendance: 13,250; Referee: Daniele Doveri

24 November 2018 13	Juventus	2–0	SPAL	Turin
18:00 CET (UTC+01:00)	Ronaldo 29'; Mandžukić 60'; Bentancur (yellow card) 64'	Report	Cionek (yellow card) 39'; Fares (yellow card) 49'; Schiattarella (yellow card) 74'	Stadium: Allianz Stadium; Attendance: 41,052; Referee: Federico La Penna

1 December 2018 14	SPAL	2–2	Empoli	Ferrara
15:00 CET (UTC+01:00)	Kurtić 5', 67', (yellow card) 54'; Felipe (yellow card) 34'; Schiattarella (yellow card) 45+2'; Cionek (red card) 49'	Report	Maietta (yellow card) 15'; Caputo 24'; Krunić 43', (yellow card) 45'; Mchedlidze (yellow card) 90'	Stadium: Stadio Paolo Mazza; Attendance: 12,622; Referee: Paolo Mazzoleni

9 December 2018 15	Genoa	1–1	SPAL	Genoa
18:00 CET (UTC+01:00)	Criscito (red card) 11'; Piątek 38' (pen.); Veloso (yellow card) 55'	Report	Petagna 15', (yellow card) 25'; Bonifazi (yellow card) 34'; Vicari (yellow card) 81'; Floccari (yellow card) 85'; Valdifiori (yellow card) 87'	Stadium: Stadio Luigi Ferraris; Attendance: 19,571; Referee: Fabrizio Pasqua

16 December 2018 16	SPAL	0–0	Chievo	Ferrara
12:30 CET (UTC+01:00)	Missiroli (yellow card) 68'; Floccari (yellow card) 90+4'	Report	Jaroszyński (yellow card) 45+3'; Radovanović (yellow card) 59'; Bani (yellow card) 67'; Birsa (yellow card) 73'	Stadium: Stadio Paolo Mazza; Attendance: 11,882; Referee: Luca Banti

22 December 2018 17	Napoli	1–0	SPAL	Naples
15:00 CET (UTC+01:00)	Albiol 45+1'; Hamšík (yellow card) 46'; Rog (yellow card) 61'	Report	Cionek (yellow card) 38'; Kurtić (yellow card) 50'	Stadium: Stadio San Paolo; Attendance: 37,093; Referee: Federico La Penna

26 December 2018 18	SPAL	0–0	Udinese	Ferrara
18:00 CET (UTC+01:00)	Schiattarella (yellow card) 37'	Report	De Paul (yellow card) 50'; Mandragora (yellow card) 89'	Stadium: Stadio Paolo Mazza; Attendance: 13,195; Referee: Daniele Doveri

29 December 2018 19	Milan	2–1	SPAL	Milan
20:30 CET (UTC+01:00)	Castillejo 16', (yellow card) 56'; Higuaín 64'; Zapata (yellow card) 73'; Suso (yellow card) 79' (yellow-red card) 89'	Report	Petagna 13'; Kurtić (yellow card) 51'; Schiattarella (yellow card) 70'	Stadium: San Siro; Attendance: 48,070; Referee: Rosario Abisso

20 January 2019 20	SPAL	1–1	Bologna	Ferrara
15:00 CET (UTC+01:00)	Valdifiori (yellow card) 40'; Kurtić 64'; Cionek (yellow card) 90+6'	Report	Palacio 24'; Soriano (yellow card) 30'; Helander (yellow card) 77'; Pulgar (yellow card) 90+4'	Stadium: Stadio Paolo Mazza; Attendance: 14,524; Referee: Michael Fabbri

27 January 2019 21	Parma	2–3	SPAL	Parma
15:00 CET (UTC+01:00)	Kucka (yellow card) 7'; Inglese 11' (pen.), 53'; Scozzarella (yellow card) 36'	Report	Fares (yellow card) 34', (goal) 87'; Lazzari (yellow card) 57'; Valoti 70'; Petagna 75', (yellow card) 76'; Felipe (yellow card) 90+1'	Stadium: Stadio Ennio Tardini; Attendance: 15,297; Referee: Rosario Abisso

3 February 2019 22	SPAL	0–0	Torino	Ferrara
12:30 CET (UTC+01:00)	Missiroli (yellow card) 6'; Cionek (yellow card) 35'; Felipe (yellow card) 84'; Fares (yellow card) 90+2'; Kurtić (yellow card) 90+4'	Report	Ansaldi (yellow card) 2'; Nkoulou (yellow card) 33' (yellow-red card) 65'; Belotti (yellow card) 61'; Zaza (yellow card) 67'	Stadium: Stadio Paolo Mazza; Attendance: 12,743; Referee: Maurizio Mariani

10 February 2019 23	Atalanta	2–1	SPAL	Bergamo
15:00 CET (UTC+01:00)	Hateboer (yellow card) 13'; Iličić 57'; Zapata 79'	Report	Missiroli (yellow card) 4'; Petagna 8'; Valoti (yellow card) 12'; Paloschi (yellow card) 29'	Stadium: Stadio Atleti Azzurri d'Italia; Attendance: 18,342; Referee: Davide Massa

17 February 2019 24	SPAL	1–4	Fiorentina	Ferrara
12:30 CET (UTC+01:00)	Petagna 36'; Fares (yellow card) 39'; Cionek (yellow card) 41'; Schiattarella (yellow card) 78'	Report	Fernandes (yellow card) 9', (goal) 44'; Veretout (yellow card) 25', (goal) 79' (pen.); Biraghi (yellow card) 35'; Milenković (yellow card) 55'; Simeone 81'; Gerson 88'	Stadium: Stadio Paolo Mazza; Attendance: 13,669; Referee: Luca Pairetto

24 February 2019 25	Sassuolo	1–1	SPAL	Reggio Emilia
15:00 CET (UTC+01:00)	Peluso 43', (yellow card) 58'; Magnanelli (yellow card) 67'; Duncan (yellow card) 89' (red card) 90+3'; Rogério (yellow card) 90+1'	Report	Valoti (yellow card) 26'; Petagna 68' (pen.)	Stadium: Mapei Stadium – Città del Tricolore; Attendance: 11,554; Referee: Fabio Maresca

3 March 2019 26	SPAL	1–2	Sampdoria	Ferrara
15:00 CET (UTC+01:00)	Fares (yellow card) 71'; Valoti (yellow card) 76'; Kurtić 90+4'; Cionek (red card) 90+7'	Report	Quagliarella 4', 11'; Vieira (yellow card) 73'; Sala (yellow card) 76'; Audero (yellow card) 90+1'	Stadium: Stadio Paolo Mazza; Attendance: 12,731; Referee: Fabrizio Pasqua

10 March 2019 27	Internazionale	2–0	SPAL	Milan
15:00 CET (UTC+01:00)	Gagliardini (yellow card) 19', (goal) 77'; João Mário (yellow card) 57'; Politano 67'; Ranocchia (yellow card) 90+2'	Report	Missiroli (yellow card) 29'; Petagna (yellow card) 45'; Valoti (yellow card) 57'; Felipe (yellow card) 63'; Vicari (yellow card) 89'	Stadium: San Siro; Attendance: 61,339; Referee: Gianpaolo Calvarese

16 March 2019 28	SPAL	2–1	Roma	Ferrara
18:00 CET (UTC+01:00)	Vicari (yellow card) 5'; Fares 22', (yellow card) 54'; Cionek (yellow card) 52'; Petagna 60' (pen.); Missiroli (yellow card) 64'	Report	Nzonzi (yellow card) 40'; Džeko (yellow card) 45+2'; Perotti 53' (pen.), (yellow card) 63'; Juan Jesus (yellow card) 57'; Cristante (yellow card) 69'	Stadium: Stadio Paolo Mazza; Attendance: 15,089; Referee: Gianluca Rocchi

31 March 2019 29	Frosinone	0–1	SPAL	Frosinone
15:00 CEST (UTC+02:00)	Valzania (yellow card) 21'; Salamon (yellow card) 84'; Dionisi (yellow card) 89'	Report	Vicari 13'; Cionek (yellow card) 46'; Kurtić (yellow card) 60'; Valoti (yellow card) 74'	Stadium: Stadio Benito Stirpe; Attendance: 12,969; Referee: Marco Di Bello

3 April 2019 30	SPAL	1–0	Lazio	Ferrara
21:00 CEST (UTC+02:00)	Lazzari (yellow card) 82'; Petagna 89' (pen.); Paloschi (yellow card) 90+3'	Report	Milinković-Savić (yellow card) 57'; Immobile (yellow card) 63'; Strakosha (yellow card) 90+4'; Durmisi (yellow card) 90+4'; Parolo (yellow card) 90+5'	Stadium: Stadio Paolo Mazza; Attendance: 13,415; Referee: Marco Guida

7 April 2019 31	Cagliari	2–1	SPAL	Cagliari
15:00 CEST (UTC+02:00)	Faragò 3'; Ceppitelli (yellow card) 18'; Cigarini (yellow card) 31'; Pavoletti 60', (yellow card) 68'; Cacciatore (yellow card) 90+1'	Report	Antenucci 18' (pen.); Dickmann (yellow card) 25'; Felipe (yellow card) 56'; Fares (yellow card) 59'	Stadium: Sardegna Arena; Attendance: 16,121; Referee: Luca Banti

13 April 2019 32	SPAL	2–1	Juventus	Ferrara
15:00 CEST (UTC+02:00)	Lazzari (yellow card) 28'; Bonifazi 49'; Floccari 74', (yellow card) 75'; Fares (yellow card) 83'; Missiroli (yellow card) 87'; Vicari (yellow card) 90+3'	Report	Kean 30'; Cuadrado (yellow card) 38'; Cancelo (yellow card) 45+1'	Stadium: Stadio Paolo Mazza; Attendance: 16,000; Referee: Daniele Doveri

20 April 2019 33	Empoli	2–4	SPAL	Empoli
15:00 CEST (UTC+02:00)	Caputo 22'; Traorè 47', (yellow card) 52'; Brighi (yellow card) 76'; Krunić (yellow card) 90+1'	Report	Lazzari (yellow card) 30'; Petagna 38' (pen.), 60', (yellow card) 62'; Cionek (yellow card) 40'; Floccari 44'; Missiroli (yellow card) 71'; Murgia (yellow card) 82'; Antenucci 88'	Stadium: Stadio Carlo Castellani; Attendance: 10,444; Referee: Gianluca Rocchi

28 April 2019 34	SPAL	1–1	Genoa	Ferrara
15:00 CEST (UTC+02:00)	Felipe (yellow card) 4', (goal) 36'; Vicari (yellow card) 39'; Petagna (yellow card) 54'	Report	Lapadula 57', (yellow card) 81'; Romero (yellow card) 62'; Rolón (yellow card) 66'	Stadium: Stadio Paolo Mazza; Attendance: 13,573; Referee: Davide Massa

4 May 2019 35	Chievo	0–4	SPAL	Verona
18:00 CEST (UTC+02:00)	Depaoli (yellow card) 18'; Meggiorini (yellow card) 57'; Dioussé (yellow card) 60'	Report	Felipe 8', 55'; Floccari 47'; Kurtić 81'	Stadium: Stadio Marc'Antonio Bentegodi; Attendance: 4,500; Referee: Riccardo Ros

12 May 2019 36	SPAL	1–2	Napoli	Ferrara
18:00 CEST (UTC+02:00)	Cionek (yellow card) 64'; Fares (yellow card) 69'; Petagna 84' (pen.)	Report	Allan 49'; Mário Rui (yellow card) 53', (goal) 88'	Stadium: Stadio Paolo Mazza; Attendance: 14,175; Referee: Eugenio Abbattista

18 May 2019 37	Udinese	3–2	SPAL	Udine
15:00 CEST (UTC+02:00)	Samir 6', (yellow card) 45'; Zeegelaar (yellow card) 28'; Okaka 32', 35'; Mandragora (yellow card) 67'; De Paul (yellow card) 83'	Report	Vicari (yellow card) 5'; Fares (yellow card) 39'; Petagna 53'; Valoti 59'; Kurtić (yellow card) 72'; Janković (yellow card) 75'	Stadium: Dacia Arena; Attendance: 24,614; Referee: Michael Fabbri

26 May 2019 38	SPAL	2–3	Milan	Ferrara
20:30 CEST (UTC+02:00)	Vicari 28'; Bonifazi (yellow card) 36'; Fares 53'; Cionek (yellow card) 65'	Report	Çalhanoğlu 18'; Kessié 23', 66' (pen.); Abate (yellow card) 27'; Bakayoko (yellow card) 81'	Stadium: Stadio Paolo Mazza; Attendance: 16,134; Referee: Paolo Valeri

=== Coppa Italia ===
12 August 2018 Third round	Spezia	0–1	SPAL	La Spezia
18:30 CEST (UTC+02:00)	De Francesco (yellow card) 85'; Vignali (yellow card) 90+3'	Report	Lazzari (yellow card) 17'; Vicari (yellow card) 37'; Petagna 46'; Everton Luiz (yellow card) 84'	Stadium: Stadio Alberto Picco; Attendance: 3,049; Referee: Davide Ghersini

4 December 2018 Fourth round	Sampdoria	2–1	SPAL	Genoa
20:45 CET (UTC+01:00)	Defrel 45+1'; Kownacki 82'	Report	Floccari 34'; Cionek (yellow card) 56'; Viviani (yellow card) 88'	Stadium: Stadio Luigi Ferraris; Attendance: 2,462; Referee: Aleandro Di Paolo

== Statistics ==
=== Appearances and goals ===
No.	Pos	Nat	Player	Total		Serie A		Coppa Italia	
No.	Pos	Nat	Player	Apps	Goals	Apps	Goals	Apps	Goals
Goalkeepers
1	GK	(Senegal) SEN	Alfred Gomis	20	0	18+1	0	1	0
2	GK	(Italy) ITA	Emiliano Viviano	12	0	12	0	0	0
17	GK	(Italy) ITA	Giacomo Poluzzi	0	0	0	0	0	0
Defenders
4	DF	(Poland) POL	Thiago Cionek	28	0	24+2	0	2	0
5	DF	(Croatia) CRO	Lorenco Šimić	7	0	2+5	0	0	0
13	DF	(Italy) ITA	Vasco Regini	3	0	1+2	0	0	0
14	DF	(Italy) ITA	Kevin Bonifazi	22	2	20+1	2	1	0
23	DF	(Italy) ITA	Francesco Vicari	24	1	21+2	1	1	0
24	DF	(Italy) ITA	Lorenzo Dickmann	7	0	2+4	0	1	0
27	DF	(Brazil) BRA	Felipe	28	0	25+2	0	1	0
33	DF	(Italy) ITA	Filippo Costa	10	0	5+3	0	1+1	0
93	DF	(Algeria) ALG	Mohamed Fares	31	2	27+3	2	1	0
Midfielders
6	MF	(Italy) ITA	Simone Missiroli	30	0	29+1	0	0	0
8	MF	(Italy) ITA	Mattia Valoti	22	1	11+10	1	1	0
11	MF	(Italy) ITA	Alessandro Murgia	10	0	5+5	0	0	0
16	MF	(Italy) ITA	Mirko Valdifiori	16	0	8+7	0	1	0
19	MF	(Slovenia) SVN	Jasmin Kurtić	26	5	24+1	5	0+1	0
28	MF	(Italy) ITA	Pasquale Schiattarella	26	0	20+5	0	1	0
29	MF	(Italy) ITA	Manuel Lazzari	28	0	27	0	1	0
Forwards
7	FW	(Italy) ITA	Mirco Antenucci	30	4	21+8	4	1	0
10	FW	(Italy) ITA	Sergio Floccari	15	2	6+8	1	1	1
37	FW	(Italy) ITA	Andrea Petagna	31	13	29+1	12	1	1
43	FW	(Italy) ITA	Alberto Paloschi	23	2	8+13	2	1+1	0
95	FW	(Montenegro) MNE	Marko Janković	1	0	0+1	0	0	0
Players transferred out during the season
3	DF	(Switzerland) SUI	Johan Djourou	6	0	3+2	0	1	0
11	FW	(Italy) ITA	Gabriele Moncini	2	0	0+1	0	0+1	0
15	DF	(Finland) FIN	Sauli Väisänen	1	0	0	0	0+1	0
25	MF	(Brazil) BRA	Everton Luiz	12	0	2+8	0	2	0
32	GK	(Serbia) SRB	Vanja Milinković-Savić	3	0	2	0	1	0
77	MF	(Italy) ITA	Federico Viviani	1	0	0	0	0+1	0
97	MF	(Italy) ITA	Mattia Vitale	1	0	0	0	1	0

Last updated: 13 April 2019
Source: Competitions

=== Goalscorers ===
Rank	No.	Pos	Nat	Name	Serie A	Coppa Italia	Total
1	37	FW	(Italy)	Andrea Petagna	12	1	13
2	19	MF	(Slovenia)	Jasmin Kurtić	5	0	5
3	7	FW	(Italy)	Mirco Antenucci	4	0	4
4	10	FW	(Italy)	Sergio Floccari	1	1	2
4	14	DF	(Italy)	Kevin Bonifazi	2	0	2
4	43	FW	(Italy)	Alberto Paloschi	2	0	2
4	93	DF	(Algeria)	Mohamed Fares	2	0	2
8	8	MF	(Italy)	Mattia Valoti	1	0	1
8	23	DF	(Italy)	Francesco Vicari	1	0	1
Own goal					0	0	0
Totals					30	2	32

Last updated: 13 April 2019

=== Clean sheets ===
Rank	No.	Pos	Nat	Name	Serie A	Coppa Italia	Total
1	1	GK	(Senegal)	Alfred Gomis	6*	1	7
2	2	GK	(Italy)	Emiliano Viviano	3	0	3
3	32	GK	(Serbia)	Vanja Milinković-Savić	1*	0	1
Totals					9	1	10

* Includes one shared clean sheet against Roma.

Last updated: 13 April 2019

=== Disciplinary record ===
No.	Pos	Nat	Name	Serie A			Coppa Italia			Total		
No.	Pos	Nat	Name	Booked	(yellow card) (yellow-red card)	Sent off (straight red)	Booked	(yellow card) (yellow-red card)	Sent off (straight red)	Booked	(yellow card) (yellow-red card)	Sent off (straight red)
32	GK	(Serbia)	Vanja Milinković-Savić	0	1	0	0	0	0	0	1	0
4	DF	(Poland)	Thiago Cionek	9	0	2	1	0	0	10	0	2
14	DF	(Italy)	Kevin Bonifazi	1	0	0	0	0	0	1	0	0
23	DF	(Italy)	Francesco Vicari	4	0	0	1	0	0	5	0	0
24	DF	(Italy)	Lorenzo Dickmann	1	0	0	0	0	0	1	0	0
27	DF	(Brazil)	Felipe	12	0	0	0	0	0	12	0	0
93	DF	(Algeria)	Mohamed Fares	10	0	0	0	0	0	10	0	0
6	MF	(Italy)	Simone Missiroli	8	0	0	0	0	0	8	0	0
8	MF	(Italy)	Mattia Valoti	6	0	0	0	0	0	6	0	0
16	MF	(Italy)	Mirko Valdifiori	3	0	0	0	0	0	3	0	0
19	MF	(Slovenia)	Jasmin Kurtić	8	0	0	0	0	0	8	0	0
25	MF	(Brazil)	Everton Luiz	5	0	0	1	0	0	6	0	0
28	MF	(Italy)	Pasquale Schiattarella	10	0	0	0	0	0	10	0	0
29	MF	(Italy)	Manuel Lazzari	6	0	0	1	0	0	7	0	0
77	MF	(Italy)	Federico Viviani	0	0	0	1	0	0	1	0	0
10	FW	(Italy)	Sergio Floccari	3	0	0	0	0	0	3	0	0
37	FW	(Italy)	Andrea Petagna	6	0	0	0	0	0	6	0	0
43	FW	(Italy)	Alberto Paloschi	3	0	0	0	0	0	3	0	0
Totals				95	1	2	5	0	0	100	1	2

Last updated: 13 April 2019
