= Marchegiani =

Marchegiani is an Italian surname. Notable people with the surname include:

- Fiorenza Marchegiani (1953–2026), Italian actress
- Gabriele Marchegiani (born 1996), Italian footballer
- Luca Marchegiani (born 1966), Italian footballer
- Mario Marchegiani (1917–?), Italian footballer
