= Schiattarella =

Schiattarella is an Italian surname. Notable people with the surname include:

- Domenico Schiattarella (born 1967), Italian racing driver
- Pasquale Schiattarella (born 1987), Italian footballer
