= Lorenco Šimić =

Croatian footballer

Personal information
- Date of birth: 15 July 1996 (age 30)
- Place of birth: Split, Croatia
- Height: 1.95 m (6 ft 5 in)
- Position: Centre-back

Team information
- Current team: Avellino
- Number: 44

Youth career
- 2007–2014: Hajduk Split

Senior career*
Years	Team	Apps	(Gls)
2014–2016	Hajduk Split II	16	(0)
2015–2016	Hajduk Split	22	(1)
2015	→ Hoverla Uzhhorod (loan)	3	(0)
2017–2020	Sampdoria	0	(0)
2017–2018	→ Empoli (loan)	15	(3)
2018–2019	→ SPAL (loan)	14	(1)
2019	→ Rijeka (loan)	0	(0)
2020	→ DAC Dunajská Streda (loan)	4	(0)
2020–2022	Zagłębie Lubin	24	(5)
2022	Lecce	7	(0)
2022–2023	Ascoli	26	(2)
2023–2025	Maccabi Haifa	23	(1)
2024–2025	→ Bari (loan)	14	(2)
2025–	Avellino	34	(3)

International career
2010	Croatia U15	2	(0)
2012	Croatia U16	2	(0)
2014	Croatia U19	4	(0)
2017–2018	Croatia U21	6	(1)
- * Club domestic league appearances and goals as of 10 May 2026

Lorenco Šimić (Croatian pronunciation: [ʃǐːmitɕ]; born 15 July 1996) is a Croatian professional footballer who plays as a centre-back for Serie B club Avellino. He also played for the Croatia U21 national team.

== Club career ==
=== Hajduk Split ===
Šimić is a product of the youth system of Hajduk Split.

==== Loan at Hoverla Uzhorod ====
He went on loan to Hoverla Uzhhorod in the Ukrainian Premier League in January 2015. He made his Ukrainian Premier League debut on 4 May 2015, in a match against Dynamo Kyiv. He made two further appearances for Hoverla, before returning to Croatia.

==== Return to Hajduk ====
Šimić was promoted to the senior squad at Hajduk in January 2016. He made his debut for Hajduk on 1 March 2016, coming on as a late substitute in a match against Osijek. Šimić got his first 1. HNL start seven days later, playing the full match and keeping a clean sheet against Inter Zaprešić. By the end of the season, he had made eleven appearances in all competitions for Hajduk.

=== Sampdoria ===
On 31 January 2017, Šimić moved to Serie A side Sampdoria.

==== Loan to SPAL ====
On 18 January 2018, Šimić moved on loan to SPAL. Then on 15 August, he returned to the club on loan, with an option to buy.

==== Loan to Rijeka ====
On 8 August 2019, Šimić was loaned to Rijeka in Croatia for the 2019–20 season, with a buying option. On 13 November 2019 it was reported, that Šimić, alongside three other players, were no longer playing for the club, as they were yet to make their debuts. However, there were no reports claiming, that he had been recalled, but at the same time, it was reported that he had left Rijeka, however, not from an official source.

==== Loan to DAC Dunajská Streda ====
On 6 February 2020, Slovak club DAC Dunajská Streda announced Šimić joined them on loan until the end of the 2019–20 season. Overall he made 4 league appearances and three starts in the Slovnaft Cup. He did not score but recorded an assist for the home side in a league match against Zemplín Michalovce, by aiding fellow Croat Marko Divković score to give DAC Dunajská Streda a 2–0 lead, in a match, that would finish as a 5–0 victory.

=== Zagłębie Lubin ===
On 14 August 2020, he moved on a permanent basis to Polish club Zagłębie Lubin and signed a two-year contract. He left the club by mutual consent on 13 January 2022.

=== Lecce ===
On 16 January 2022, Lorenco joined Lecce until the end of the 2023–24 season, with an option to extend for an additional year.

=== Ascoli ===
On 21 July 2022, Šimić moved to Ascoli on a two-year deal.

=== Maccabi Haifa ===
On 21 August 2023, Šimić moved to Maccabi Haifa on a four-year deal.

==== Loan to Bari ====
On 30 August 2024, he returned to Italy and joined Serie B side Bari on loan.

=== Avellino ===
On 14 July 2025, Šimić signed a two-year contract with Avellino in Serie B.

== Career statistics ==
As of 15 July 2024

Appearances and goals by club, season and competition
Club	Season	League			Cup		Other		Total	
Club	Season	Division	Apps	Goals	Apps	Goals	Apps	Goals	Apps	Goals
Hajduk Split	2014–15	Croatian First Football League	0	0	0	0	0	0	0	0
Hajduk Split	2015–16	Croatian First Football League	9	1	2	0	0	0	11	1
Hajduk Split	2016–17	Croatian First Football League	13	0	2	0	1 (Note: Appearance in UEFA Europa League)	0	16	0
Hajduk Split	Total		22	1	4	0	1	0	27	1
Hoverla Uzhhorod (loan)	2014–15	Ukrainian Premier League	3	0	0	0	0	0	3	0
Sampdoria	2016–17	Serie A	0	0	0	0	0	0	0	0
Sampdoria	2017–18	Serie A	0	0	0	0	0	0	0	0
Sampdoria	Total		0	0	0	0	0	0	0	0
Empoli (loan)	2017–18	Serie B	15	3	0	0	0	0	15	3
SPAL (loan)	2017–18	Serie A	6	1	0	0	0	0	6	1
SPAL (loan)	2018–19	Serie A	8	0	0	0	0	0	8	0
Rijeka (loan)	2019–20	Croatian First Football League	0	0	0	0	0	0	0	0
DAC 1904 Dunajská Streda (loan)	2019–20	Slovak First Football League	4	0	3	0	0	0	7	0
Zagłębie Lubin	2020–21	Ekstraklasa	17	4	1	1	—		18	5
Zagłębie Lubin	2021–22	Ekstraklasa	7	1	1	0	—		8	1
Zagłębie Lubin	Total		24	5	2	1	0	0	26	6
Lecce	2021–22	Serie B	7	0	—		—		7	0
Ascoli	2022–23	Serie B	26	2	0	0	—		26	2
Ascoli	2023–24	Serie B	0	0	1	0	—		1	0
Ascoli	Total		26	2	1	0	—		27	2
Maccabi Haifa	2023–24	Israeli Premier League	23	1	2	0	10 (Note: One appearance in UEFA Champions League, five appearances in UEFA Europa League, four appearances in UEFA Europa Conference League)	0	35	1
Career totals			138	13	12	1	11	0	161	14
