= Mattia Finotto =

Italian footballer (born 1992)

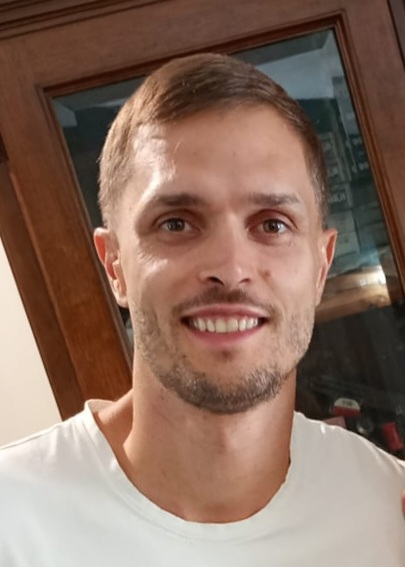
- Finotto in 2025

Personal information
- Date of birth: 28 December 1992 (age 33)
- Place of birth: Valdobbiadene, Italy
- Height: 1.83 m (6 ft 0 in)
- Position: Forward

Team information
- Current team: Carrarese
- Number: 32

Senior career*
Years	Team	Apps	(Gls)
2010–2011	Ardita QDP	24	(10)
2011–2012	Sambonifacese	32	(3)
2012–2014	Monza	62	(18)
2014–2019	SPAL	95	(22)
2017–2018	→ Ternana (loan)	28	(3)
2018–2019	→ Cittadella (loan)	27	(7)
2019–2022	Monza	29	(8)
2021	→ Pordenone (loan)	0	(0)
2022–2023	SPAL	25	(4)
2023	Cosenza	15	(0)
2023–2024	Triestina	19	(2)
2024–	Carrarese	89	(17)
- * Club domestic league appearances and goals as of 13 May 2026

Mattia Finotto (born 28 December 1992) is an Italian professional footballer who plays as a forward for Serie B club Carrarese.

== Club career ==
Finotto made his professional debut in the Lega Pro for SPAL on 31 August 2014 in a game against Pontedera.

On 5 July 2019, he returned to Monza on a 2-year contract.

On 1 February 2021, Finotto was sent on a six-month loan to Serie B side Pordenone.

On 12 January 2022, Monza announce the sale of Finotto to SPAL on a permanent basis.

On 16 June 2023, Finotto signed a 1.5-year contract with Cosenza.

Finotto left Triestina by mutual consent on 1 February 2024.

On the next day, Finotto signed a 1.5-year contract with Carrarese.

== Career statistics ==
As of match played 6 May 2022

Club	Season	League			Coppa Italia		Other		Total	
Club	Season	Division	Apps	Goals	Apps	Goals	Apps	Goals	Apps	Goals
Ardita QDP	2010–11	Eccellenza	24	10	—		—		24	10
Sambonifacese	2011–12	Lega Pro 2D	32	3	—		3 (Note: Appearances in Coppa Italia Lega Pro)	0	35	3
Monza	2012–13	Lega Pro 2D	30	10	—		6 (Note: Four appearances one goal in play-offs, two appearances one goal in Coppa Italia Lega Pro)	2	36	12
Monza	2013–14	Lega Pro 2D	32	8	2	1	1	0	35	9
Monza	Total		62	18	2	1	7	2	71	21
SPAL	2014–15	Lega Pro	34	8	—		5	0	39	8
SPAL	2015–16	Lega Pro	32	11	2	0	6 (Note: Four appearances one goal in Coppa Italia Lega Pro, two appearances two goals in Supercoppa di Lega Pro)	3	40	14
SPAL	2016–17	Serie B	29	3	0	0	—		29	3
SPAL	Total		95	22	2	0	11	3	108	25
Ternana (loan)	2017–18	Serie B	28	3	0	0	—		28	3
Cittadella (loan)	2018–19	Serie B	27	7	3	1	2 (Note: Appearances in play-offs)	0	32	8
Monza	2019–20	Serie C	23	8	3	2	0	0	26	10
Monza	2020–21	Serie B	4	0	1	0	—		5	0
Monza	2021–22	Serie B	2	0	0	0	—		2	0
Monza	Total		29	8	4	2	0	0	33	10
Pordenone (loan)	2020–21	Serie B	0	0	0	0	—		0	0
SPAL	2021–22	Serie B	11	3	—		—		11	3
Career total			308	74	11	4	23	5	342	83

== Honours ==
Monza

- Serie C Group A: 2019–20
