= Mario Marchegiani =

Italian footballer (born 1917)

Personal information
- Date of birth: 27 November 1917
- Place of birth: Frosinone, Kingdom of Italy
- Height: 1.68 m (5 ft 6 in)
- Position: Midfielder

Senior career*
| Years | Team | Apps | (Gls) |
| 1933–1934 | Bellator Frusino | | |
| 1934–1937 | Roma | 5 | (0) |
| 1937–1938 | Sanremese | 13 | (3) |
- * Club domestic league appearances and goals

Mario Marchegiani (born 27 November 1917) was an Italian professional football player.

Marchegiani played for 2 seasons (5 games) in the Serie A for A.S. Roma.
