= Mohamed Farès =

Algeria international footballer (born 1996)

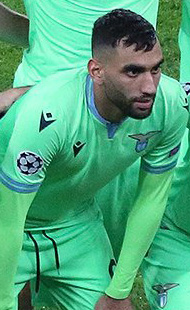
- Farès with Lazio in 2020

Personal information
- Full name: Mohamed Salim Farès
- Date of birth: 15 February 1996 (age 30)
- Place of birth: Aubervilliers, France
- Height: 1.83 m (6 ft 0 in)
- Positions: Left wing-back; left winger

Team information
- Current team: Lazio

Youth career
- 2012–2013: Bordeaux
- 2013–2014: Hellas Verona

Senior career*
Years	Team	Apps	(Gls)
2014–2019	Hellas Verona	56	(0)
2018–2019	→ SPAL (loan)	35	(3)
2019–2020	SPAL	8	(0)
2020–	Lazio	21	(0)
2021–2022	→ Genoa (loan)	9	(2)
2022	→ Torino (loan)	0	(0)
2023–2024	→ Brescia (loan)	16	(0)
2024–2025	→ Panserraikos (loan)	29	(2)
2025–2026	→ Forte Virtus (loan)	4	(1)

International career^{‡}
2017–2021	Algeria	12	(0)
Medal record
Men's football
Representing Algeria
Africa Cup of Nations
Winner	2019 Egypt
- * Club domestic league appearances and goals as of 09 August 2026 ‡ National team caps and goals as of 13 October 2021

Mohamed Salim Farès (Arabic: محمد سليم فارس; born 15 February 1996) is a professional footballer who plays as a left wing-back or left winger for Serie A club Lazio. Born in France, he plays for the Algeria national team.

== Club career ==
=== Hellas Verona ===
Fares joined Hellas Verona in January 2013 from Girondins de Bordeaux. He made his debut on 14 December 2014 in a 2–1 Serie A away win at Udinese, replacing Alessandro Agostini in stoppage time.

=== SPAL ===
On 18 June 2018, Fares signed with SPAL on loan from Verona until 30 June 2019.

On 1 July 2019, he signed permanently with SPAL.

=== Lazio ===
On 1 October 2020, Fares signed a five-year deal with Lazio.

==== Genoa (loan) ====
On 31 August 2021, Farès joined Genoa on loan until 30 June 2022.

==== Torino (loan) ====
On 14 January 2022, Farès moved on a new loan to Torino, with an option to buy. His season ended four days later due to an injury received in training.

==== Brescia (loan) ====
On 6 September 2023, Lazio sent Farès on a season-long loan to Serie B club Brescia.

==== Panserraikos (loan) ====
On 20 August 2024, Farès signed for Greek club Panserraikos on a season-long loan.

On 2 October 2025, Farès joined UAE First Division League side Forte Virtus on loan with an option to buy.

== Career statistics ==
=== Club ===
As of match played 14 April 2024

Appearances and goals by club, season and competition
Club	Season	League			Coppa Italia		Europe		Total	
Club	Season	Division	Apps	Goals	Apps	Goals	Apps	Goals	Apps	Goals
Hellas Verona	2014–15	Serie A	1	0	1	0	—		2	0
Hellas Verona	2015–16	Serie A	11	0	1	0	—		12	0
Hellas Verona	2016–17	Serie B	14	0	3	0	—		17	0
Hellas Verona	2017–18	Serie A	30	0	3	1	—		33	1
Hellas Verona	Total		56	0	8	1	—		64	1
SPAL (loan)	2018–19	Serie A	35	3	1	0	—		36	3
SPAL	2019–20	Serie A	8	0	0	0	—		8	0
Lazio	2020–21	Serie A	21	0	2	0	6 (Note: Appearances in UEFA Champions League)	0	29	0
Lazio	2022–23	Serie A	0	0	0	0	0	0	0	0
Lazio	Total		21	0	2	0	6	0	29	0
Genoa (loan)	2021–22	Serie A	9	2	0	0	—		9	2
Torino (loan)	2021–22	Serie A	0	0	0	0	—		0	0
Brescia (loan)	2023–24	Serie B	16	0	0	0	—		16	0
Career total			145	5	11	1	6	0	162	6

=== International ===
As of match played 12 October 2021

Appearances and goals by national team and year
National team	Year	Apps	Goals
Algeria	2017	1	0
Algeria	2018	3	0
Algeria	2019	5	0
Algeria	2020	1	0
Algeria	2021	2	0
Total		12	0

== Honours ==
Algeria

- Africa Cup of Nations: 2019
