= Luca Mora =

Italian footballer

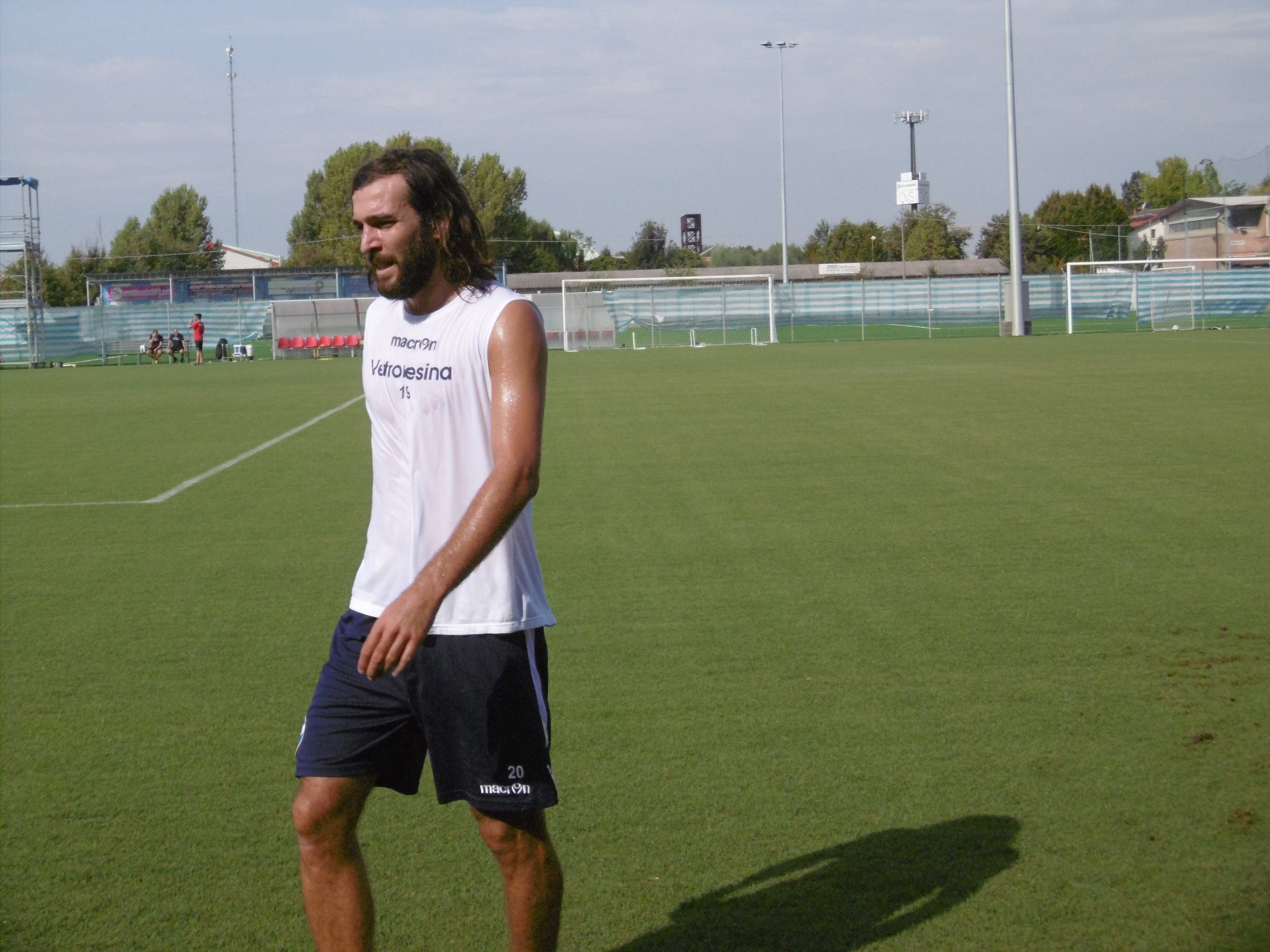

Personal information
- Date of birth: 10 May 1988 (age 38)
- Place of birth: Parma, Italy
- Height: 1.83 m (6 ft 0 in)
- Position: Midfielder

Team information
- Current team: Cittadella Vis Modena
- Number: 23

Senior career*
Years	Team	Apps	(Gls)
2007–2009	Castellarano		
2009–2011	Crociati Noceto		
2011–2012	Pro Patria	32	(1)
2012–2015	Alessandria	86	(6)
2015–2018	SPAL	83	(12)
2018–2021	Spezia	78	(6)
2021–2022	SPAL	42	(1)
2022–2024	Pescara	35	(5)
2024	Fiorenzuola	15	(0)
2024–	Cittadella Vis Modena	10	(0)
- * Club domestic league appearances and goals as of 17 November 2024

Luca Mora (born 10 May 1988) is an Italian professional footballer who plays as a midfielder for Serie D club Cittadella Vis Modena.

== Club career ==
Mora made his professional debut in the Lega Pro for Alessandria on 19 September 2014 in a game against Pavia.

On 22 January 2021 he returned to SPAL on a 1.5-year contract.

On 15 July 2022, Mora signed with Pescara.

On 12 January 2024, Mora signed a contract with Fiorenzuola until 30 June 2025.
