= Michele Cremonesi =

Italian professional footballer

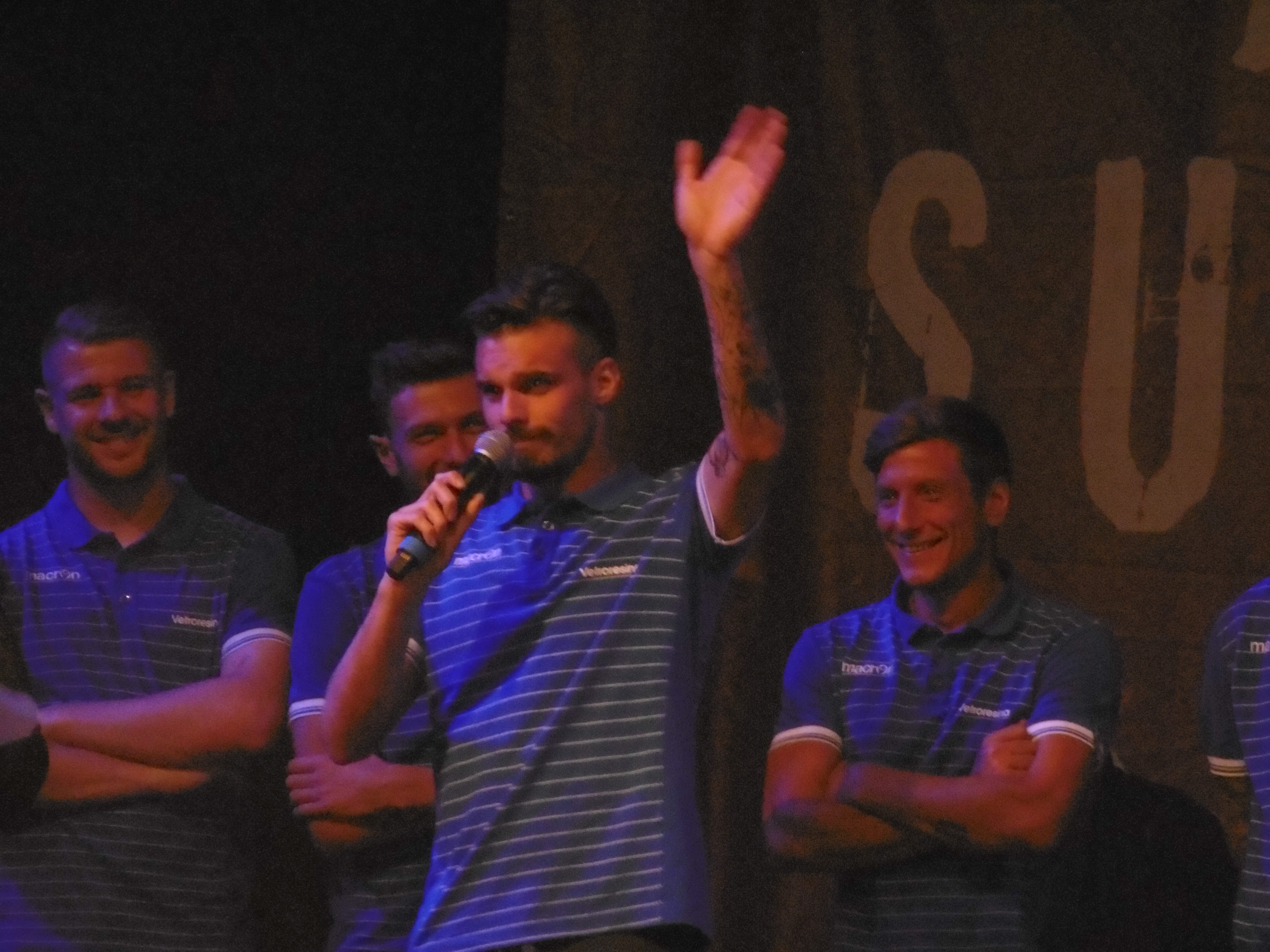
- Cremonesi in 2017

Personal information
- Date of birth: 15 April 1988 (age 38)
- Place of birth: Cremona, Italy
- Height: 1.84 m (6 ft 1/2 in)
- Position: Centre-back

Team information
- Current team: Fiorenzuola
- Number: 26

Youth career
- Cremonese

Senior career*
| Years | Team | Apps | (Gls) |
| 2005–2013 | Cremonese | 112 | (4) |
| 2013–2016 | Crotone | 52 | (0) |
| 2016–2019 | SPAL | 34 | (2) |
| 2018 | → Virtus Entella (loan) | 15 | (0) |
| 2018–2019 | → Perugia (loan) | 18 | (0) |
| 2019–2021 | Venezia | 26 | (0) |
| 2021–2023 | Reggiana | 25 | (6) |
| 2023– | Fiorenzuola | 10 | (1) |

International career
| 2003–2004 | Italy U15 | 4 | (0) |
| 2003–2004 | Italy U16 | 15 | (2) |
| 2004–2005 | Italy U17 | 16 | (0) |
| 2006 | Italy U19 | 4 | (0) |
| 2006–2007 | Italy U20 | 3 | (0) |
| 2009 | Italy U21 | 1 | (0) |
- * Club domestic league appearances and goals as of 3 May 2024

Michele Cremonesi (born 15 April 1988) is an Italian professional footballer who plays as a centre-back for Serie D club Fiorenzuola.

== Club career ==
On 10 November 2021, he joined Reggiana in Serie C.

On 11 October 2023, Cremonesi signed with Fiorenzuola until the end of the season.

== International ==
He represented Italy at the 2005 UEFA European Under-17 Championship (3rd place) and the 2005 FIFA U-17 World Championship.
