= Federico Viviani (footballer, born 1992) =

Italian footballer

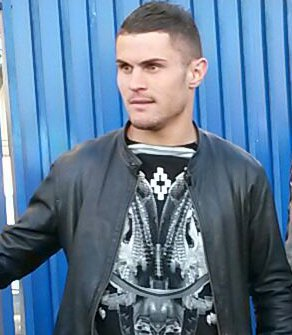
- Viviani 2016

Personal information
- Date of birth: 24 March 1992 (age 34)
- Place of birth: Lecco, Italy
- Height: 1.80 m (5 ft 11 in)
- Position: Defensive midfielder

Youth career
- 2005–2011: Roma

Senior career*
| Years | Team | Apps | (Gls) |
| 2011–2015 | Roma | 6 | (0) |
| 2012–2013 | → Padova (loan) | 22 | (2) |
| 2013–2014 | → Pescara (loan) | 6 | (2) |
| 2014–2015 | → Latina (loan) | 51 | (11) |
| 2015–2018 | Verona | 19 | (3) |
| 2016–2017 | → Bologna (loan) | 17 | (2) |
| 2017–2018 | → SPAL (loan) | 29 | (3) |
| 2018–2022 | SPAL | 25 | (4) |
| 2019 | → Frosinone (loan) | 5 | (0) |
| 2019–2020 | → Livorno (loan) | 10 | (0) |
| 2022–2023 | Brescia | 14 | (0) |
| 2023–2026 | Ternana | 5 | (0) |

International career
| 2011 | Italy U19 | 7 | (2) |
| 2011–2012 | Italy U20 | 7 | (1) |
| 2012–2015 | Italy U21 | 18 | (2) |
- * Club domestic league appearances and goals

Federico Viviani (born 24 March 1992) is an Italian former professional footballer who played a defensive midfielder. He played as a deep-lying playmaker in the defensive midfield role, and was also known as a free-kick specialist. He also represented Italy national team at various youth international levels.

Viviani is a former Italy U21 international. He is also the son of Mauro Viviani, a former football player of Lazio in the 1980s.

== Club career ==
=== Roma ===
Viviani started his career at A.S. Roma. He was given his first team debut by Roma coach Luis Enrique in the 2011–12 UEFA Europa League play-off round against Slovan Bratislava in August 2011. On 12 December 2011, at age 19, he made his debut in Serie A in the 1–1 draw against Juventus, in which he started. He played 9 games in all competitions his first season, mostly coming on as a substitute.

On 22 March 2012, Viviani captained the Roma Primavera side which won the Tim Cup (Coppa Italia) after a 2–1 aggregate win against Juventus in a two legged final. After coming through the youth system, Viviani signed a 5-year contract in May 2012.

==== Serie B loan ====
He was loaned to Padova for the 2012–13 season where he scored two goals in 22 matches. He made his debut with the 18 August game against Atalanta. On 25 September, Viviani scored his first goals of his career, scoring both goals in a 2–0 win against Empoli.

On 1 July 2013, Viviani joined Pescara on loan, again in Serie B. He made his debut 14 September in the next away game against Varese, scoring on his debut, scoring with a freekick in a 3–2 loss. On 24 September, Viviani scored his second goal for by scoring a freekick against Avellino in a 1–1 draw.

In January 2014, Viviani was recalled by A.S. Roma as part of the transfer deal which saw Gianluca Caprari join Pescara, on the same day Viviani was loaned back out, this time to fellow Serie B side Latina. He was given the number 7 shirt. On 28 February, Viviani scored his first goal for Latina in a 3–0 victory against his old side Padova with a long range shot. Viviani scored a freekick against Novara on 12 April in a 4–1 victory. On 10 May, Vivani scored a freekick in a 2–0 victory for Latina over Ternana.

He was integral to helping Latina to a 3rd-place finish, guiding them in the Serie B playoffs, Latina got to the final but lost out promotion to Serie A to A.C. Cesena after losing the two legged final 4–2 on aggregate.

After returning to A.S. Roma, on 26 June, Viviani's agent revealed that his future would depend on Roma's plans for the player under manager Rudi Garcia.

On 21 July 2014, Roma confirmed that they had let the player discuss terms with Championship side Leeds United. The player was also left out of the Roma squad for their pre-season tour. On 22 July 2014, Viviani was set to sign for Leeds United on a season long loan deal, and he was in attendance on that day for Leeds' 2–0 pre-season friendly defeat against Mansfield Town. However, the transfer of Viviani to Leeds dramatically fell through despite the player attending pre season games.

After his Leeds move fell through, he re-joined Serie B side Latina.

=== Verona ===
On 30 June 2015 Viviani was signed by Verona for €4 million.

==== Bologna ====
On 31 August 2016, Viviani joined fellow Serie A side Bologna on a season-long loan deal. On 20 November, he scored his first league goal for Bologna, a free-kick and assisted Mattia Destro's headed goal that put Bologna level, before Blerim Džemaili made it 2–1, followed by Viviani's splendid set-piece which put the game to bed and allowed Bologna to claim a 3–1 home victory over Palermo; ending a six-game winless run for Roberto Donadoni's side.

=== SPAL ===
He joined newly promoted Serie A side S.P.A.L. 2013 in the summer of 2017, during his first season he scored 3 times in 27 games as helped keep the club in Serie A and signed a permanent deal with the club in June 2018.

==== Frosinone ====
On 24 January 2019, Viviani joined to Frosinone on loan with an option to buy until 30 June 2019.

==== Livorno ====
On 2 September 2019, Viviani joined Serie B side Livorno on loan until 30 June 2020.

=== Brescia ===
On 25 August 2022, Viviani moved to Brescia.

=== Ternana ===
On 8 September 2023, Viviani signed a three-season contract with Ternana. He missed the 2024–25 and 2025–26 season completely due to serious knee injuries, and subsequently retired.

== International career ==
Viviani played for the Azzurrini at 2011 UEFA European Under-19 Football Championship elite qualification. In 2011–12 season, he received a call-up from Italy national under-20 football team for the first round of Four Nations Tournament, which the fixture of the "tournament" would be spread over the year. He was made captain of the Italy national under-20 football team by manager Luigi Di Biagio.

On 25 April 2012 he made his debut with the Italy U-21, in a friendly match won 4–1 against Scotland. In November 2013, Viviani scored a freekick in a 3–0 victory against the Northern Ireland U21s.

On 10–12 March 2014 was called up to a training squad for the senior Italy national football team by the then Manager Cesare Prandelli, the training squad was organized in order to see some of the younger players ahead of the 2014 World Cup in June 2014.

He participated at the 2015 UEFA European Under-21 Championship played in Czech Republic.

== Style of play ==
Viviani is a deep-lying playmaker who plays primarily as a 'Regista' in the defensive midfield position; he is also renowned for his ability from free kicks. His style of play has been compared to compatriots Andrea Pirlo and Marco Verratti.

== Honours ==
Latina

- Serie B Promotion Playoff Final (Runner-up): 2013–14
