= Federico Mattiello =

Italian footballer

Personal information
- Date of birth: 14 July 1995 (age 31)
- Place of birth: Borgo a Mozzano, Italy
- Height: 1.84 m (6 ft 0 in)
- Positions: Midfielder; left-back

Youth career
- 2009–2014: Juventus

Senior career*
Years	Team	Apps	(Gls)
2014–2018	Juventus	2	(0)
2015–2016	→ Chievo (loan)	4	(0)
2017–2018	→ SPAL (loan)	19	(0)
2018–2022	Atalanta	0	(0)
2018	→ SPAL (loan)	10	(0)
2018–2019	→ Bologna (loan)	17	(1)
2019–2020	→ Cagliari (loan)	18	(0)
2020–2021	→ Spezia (loan)	1	(0)
2022	→ Alessandria (loan)	12	(0)
2022–2023	Go Ahead Eagles	6	(0)

International career
2010–2011	Italy U-16	6	(1)
2011–2012	Italy U-17	8	(0)
2014–2015	Italy U-20	4	(0)
- * Club domestic league appearances and goals as of 17 May 2023

Federico Mattiello (born 14 July 1995) is an Italian professional footballer who plays as a defender.

== Club career ==
=== Juventus ===
Born in Lucca, Mattiello joined the Juventus youth system as a 13-year-old after impressing in the youth squads of Lucchese, where he had played for four seasons; he had previously also played for Valdottavo. He was also a talented junior tennis player at the time, but chose to concentrate on football instead. He won the Coppa Italia and Supercoppa with the Juventus Primavera side in 2013.

On 9 November 2014, Mattiello made his debut for the first team, coming on as a late second-half substitute for fellow youth product Claudio Marchisio in the 7–0 thrashing of Parma. He was sent to Chievo Verona on loan in February 2015 to gain more playing time, but his loan spell was cut short when Radja Nainggolan broke his leg in the club's game against Roma on 8 March, and he was ruled out for the rest of the season. On 3 July 2015, an agreement was reached between Juventus and Chievo, that would see Mattiello's loan with the latter club renewed for the following season. He returned to action on 19 October, starting in a 3–2 home loss to Genoa. Three days later, however, he suffered another serious injury in training. In July 2017, Mattiello was loaned out to S.P.A.L. for the 2017–18 season.

=== Atalanta and loans ===
On 31 January 2018, Mattiello was signed by Atalanta, who agreed to keep him on loan with S.P.A.L. until the end of the season. On 20 July 2018, Mattiello joined Bologna on loan from Atalanta until 30 June 2019. On 23 September, he scored the first goal of his career, the opener in a 2–0 home win over Roma in the league. On 10 July 2019, Mattiello was loaned out to Cagliari. On 15 September 2020, he joined Spezia. On 31 January 2022, Mattiello was loaned to Alessandria. On 1 September 2022, Mattiello's contract with Atalanta was terminated by mutual consent.

=== Go Ahead Eagles ===
On 5 September 2022, after having been released from his Atalanta contract, Mattiello signed a contract with Dutch Eredivisie club Go Ahead Eagles until the end of the 2022–23 season.

== International career ==
Since 2010, Mattiello has made 18 appearances for Italy at youth level; he managed six appearances and one goal with the Under-16 team (which came against Ukraine on 16 October 2010), eight appearances with the Under-17 side, and four with the Under-20 side.

== Style of play ==
Mattiello is capable of playing as a full-back or winger on either flank.

== Career statistics ==
As of match played 1 August 2020

Appearances and goals by club, season and competition
Club	Season	League	League		Cup		Europe		Other		Total	
Club	Season	League	Apps	Goals	Apps	Goals	Apps	Goals	Apps	Goals	Apps	Goals
Juventus	2014–15	Serie A	2	0	1	0	–		–		3	0
Chievo (loan)	2014–15	Serie A	3	0	0	0	–		–		3	0
Chievo (loan)	2015–16	Serie A	1	0	0	0	–		–		1	0
Chievo (loan)	Total		4	0	0	0	0	0	0	0	4	0
SPAL (loan)	2017–18	Serie A	29	0	2	0	–		–		31	0
Bologna (loan)	2018–19	Serie A	17	1	2	0	–		–		19	1
Cagliari (loan)	2019–20	Serie A	18	0	0	0	–		–		18	0
Career total			70	1	5	0	0	0	0	0	75	1

== Honours ==
=== Club ===
Juventus Primavera

- Coppa Italia Primavera: 2012–13
- Supercoppa Primavera: 2013

First team

- Serie A: 2014–15, 2016–17
- Coppa Italia: 2014–15, 2016–17

=== Individual ===
- MVP of Al Kass International Cup U-17: January 2012
