= Giacomo Poluzzi =

Italian footballer

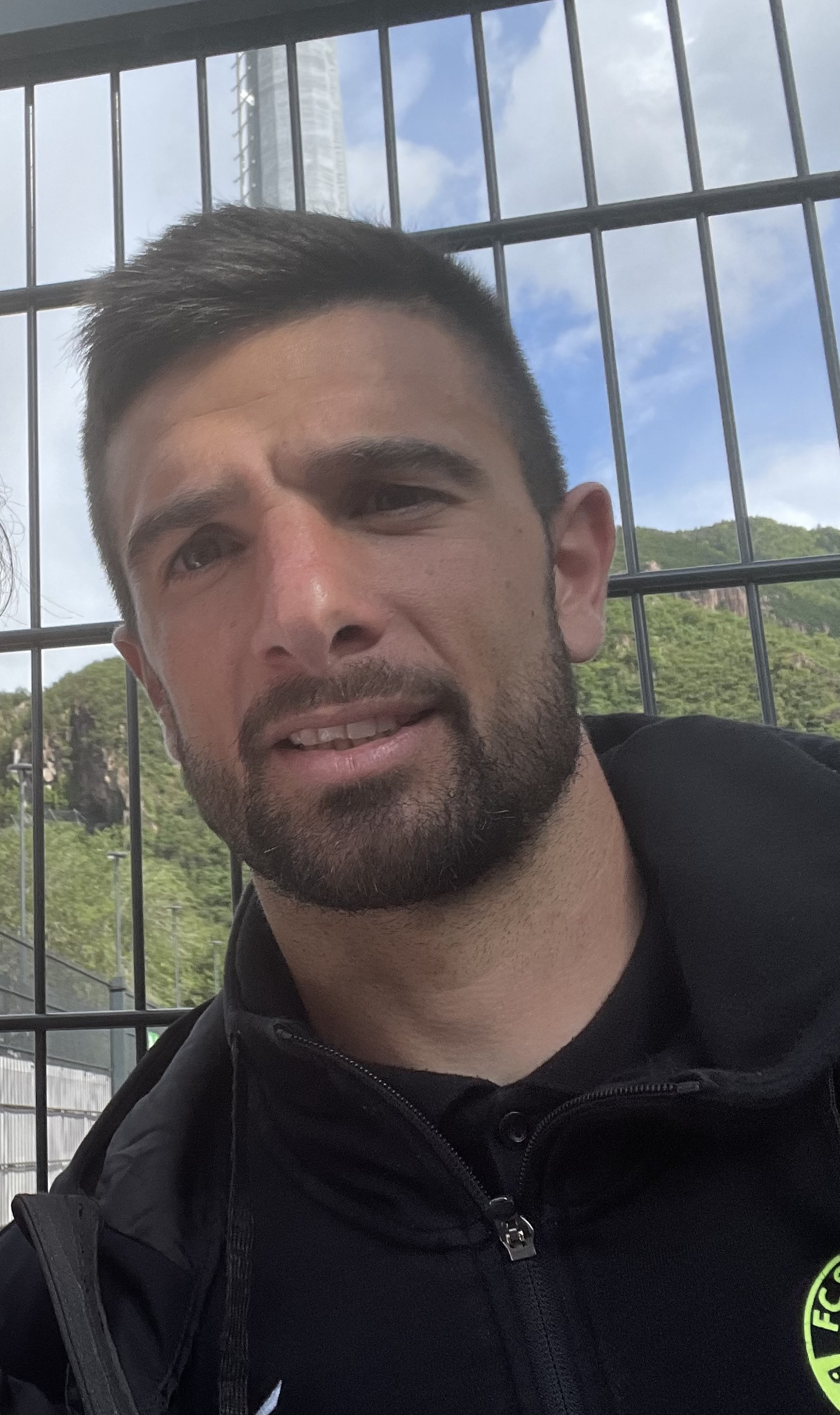
- Poluzzi in 2022

Personal information
- Date of birth: 25 February 1988 (age 38)
- Place of birth: Bologna, Italy
- Height: 1.86 m (6 ft 1 in)
- Position: Goalkeeper

Senior career*
Years	Team	Apps	(Gls)
2005–2006	Crevalcore	33	(0)
2006–2007	Carpi	34	(0)
2007–2008	Giacomense	30	(0)
2008–2010	Este	31	(0)
2010–2013	Giacomense	71	(0)
2013–2015	Alessandria	27	(0)
2015–2017	Fidelis Andria	43	(0)
2017–2019	SPAL	2	(0)
2019–2020	Virtus Francavilla	19	(0)
2020–2026	Südtirol	172	(0)
2026	Ravenna	9	(0)
- * Club domestic league appearances and goals as of 30 April 2026

Giacomo Poluzzi (born 25 February 1988) is an Italian professional footballer who plays as a goalkeeper.

== Club career ==
He made his professional debut in the Lega Pro for Alessandria on 23 January 2015 in a game against Novara.

On 15 July 2015, he signed a one-year deal with Fidelis Andria. In January 2016, he extended his contract with Andria until 2017.

On 18 September 2019, he joined Serie C club Virtus Francavilla.

On 12 August 2020 he joined Südtirol.
