= Eros Schiavon =

Italian footballer (born 1983)

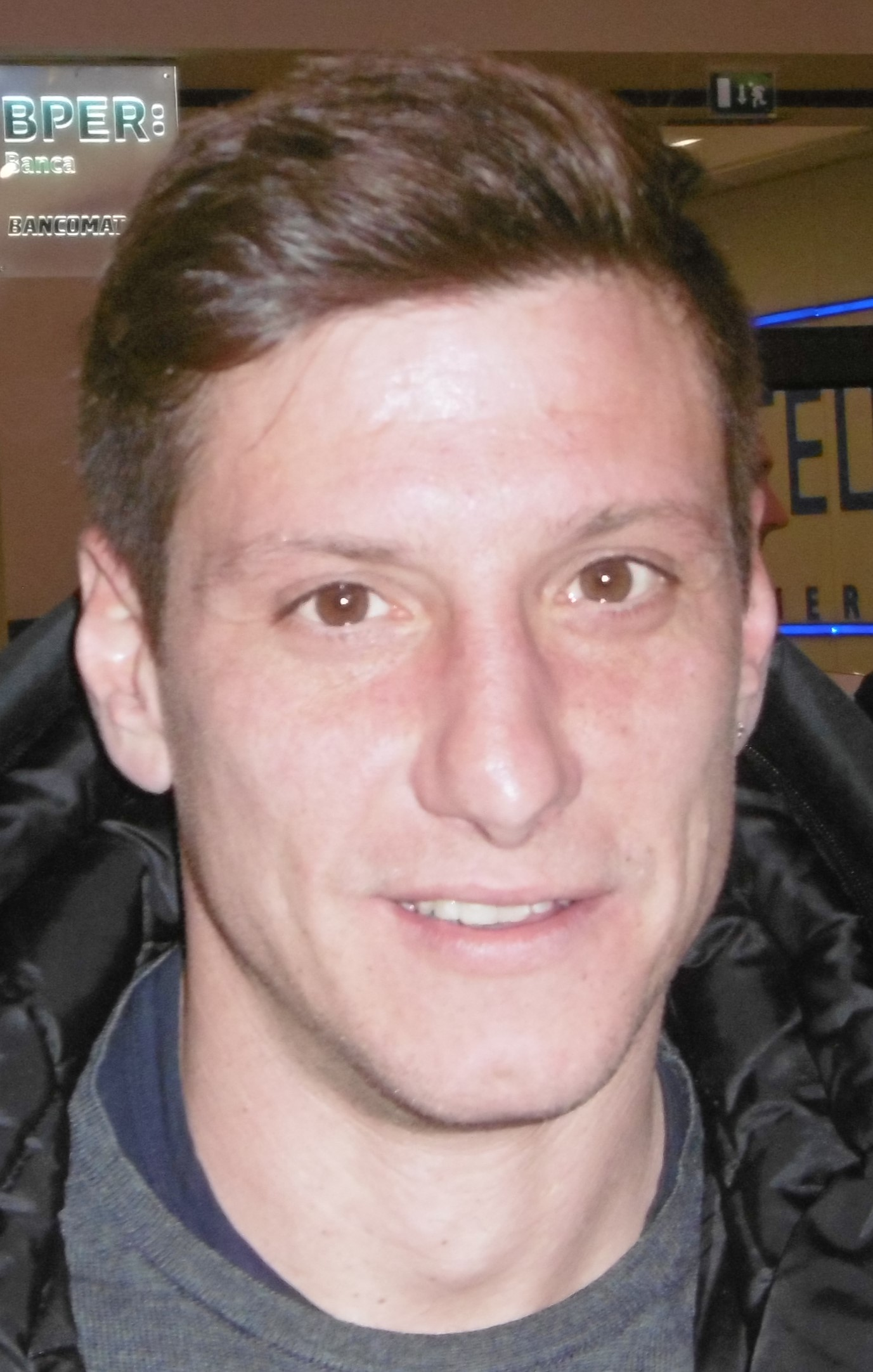

Personal information
- Date of birth: 24 April 1983 (age 43)
- Place of birth: Piove di Sacco, Italy
- Height: 1.78 m (5 ft 10 in)
- Position: Midfielder

Team information
- Current team: Sant'Agostino

Youth career
- Padova

Senior career*
Years	Team	Apps	(Gls)
2002–2004	Belluno	60	(6)
2004–2006	Treviso	0	(0)
2005	→ Portosummaga (loan)	16	(0)
2005–2006	→ Jesolo (loan)	34	(1)
2006–2010	SPAL	87	(9)
2010–2011	Portosummaga	38	(2)
2011–2013	Cittadella	72	(9)
2013–2015	Avellino	64	(3)
2016–2018	SPAL	43	(3)
2018–2020	Pro Vercelli	40	(0)
2020–2021	Siena	22	(0)
2021–	Sant'Agostino		
- * Club domestic league appearances and goals as of 19 June 2021

Eros Schiavon (born 24 April 1983) is an Italian footballer who plays as a central midfielder for Sant'Agostino.

== Biography ==
Schiavon made his professional debuts with Belluno, in Serie D. He spent the most part of his career playing for Serie D and Serie C clubs.

In August 2010 he left SPAL to rejoin Portosummaga.

On 23 June 2011 Cittadella signed Schiavon after a successful season at Portosummaga.

In January 2016 Schiavon signs again with SPAL in Lega Pro, third division of Italy. On the 23rd of April with SPAL he wins division three moving up to Serie B after 23 years from the last time.

On 9 August 2018, he joined Serie C side Pro Vercelli for free.

On 7 July 2021, he moved to an amateur side Sant'Agostino.
