= Filippo Costa =

Italian footballer (born 1995)

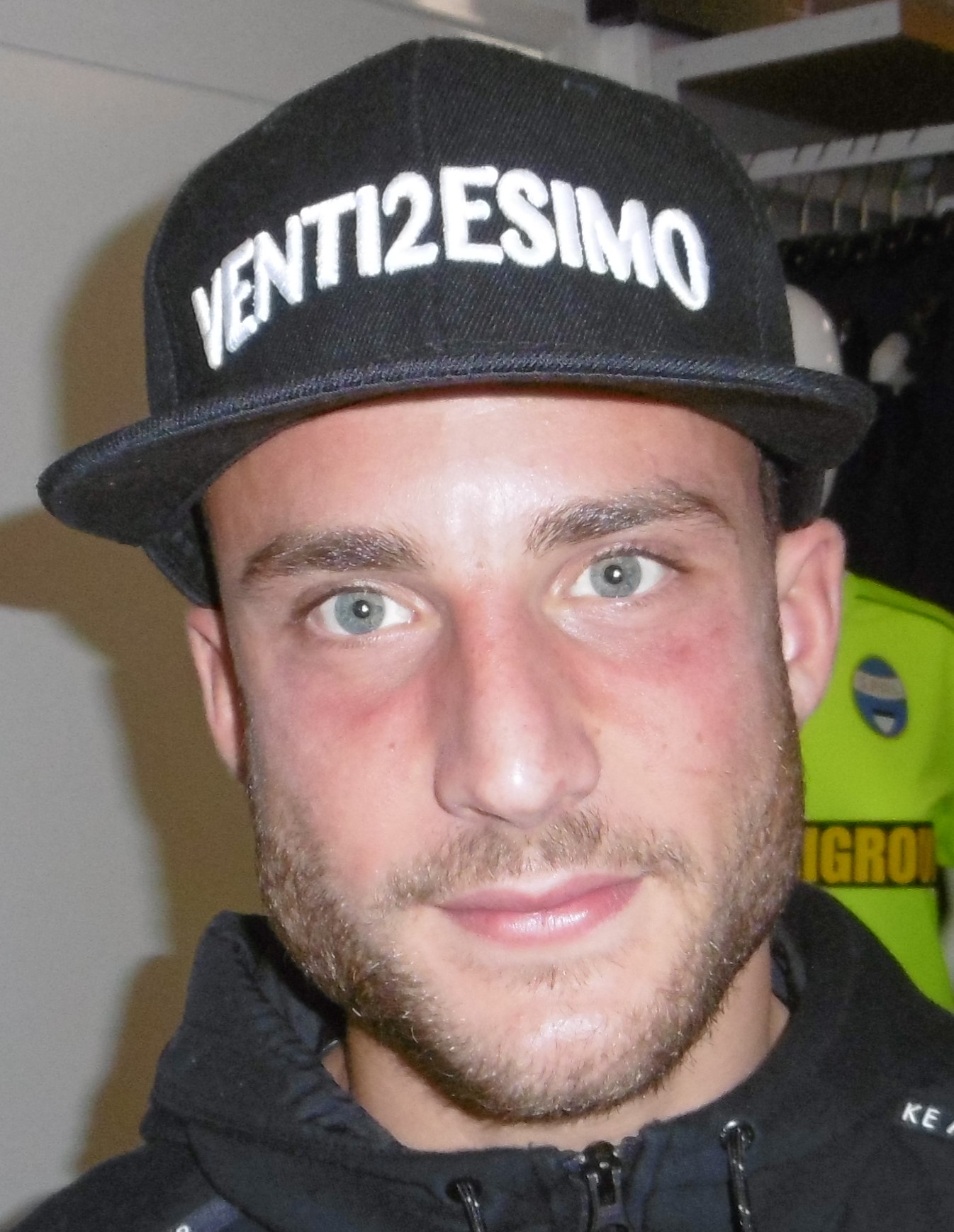

Personal information
- Date of birth: 21 May 1995 (age 31)
- Place of birth: Noventa Vicentina, Italy
- Height: 1.75 m (5 ft 9 in)
- Position: Left midfielder

Team information
- Current team: Vicenza
- Number: 32

Youth career
- 2012–2014: Chievo

Senior career*
| Years | Team | Apps | (Gls) |
| 2014–2017 | Chievo | 6 | (0) |
| 2014–2015 | → Pisa (loan) | 26 | (4) |
| 2015–2016 | → Bournemouth (loan) | 0 | (0) |
| 2017 | → SPAL (loan) | 15 | (1) |
| 2017–2019 | SPAL | 32 | (1) |
| 2019–2023 | Napoli | 0 | (0) |
| 2019–2020 | → Bari (loan) | 27 | (1) |
| 2020–2021 | → Virtus Entella (loan) | 23 | (2) |
| 2022 | → Parma (loan) | 3 | (0) |
| 2022–2023 | → Foggia (loan) | 32 | (3) |
| 2023– | Vicenza | 94 | (6) |

International career^{‡}
| 2011 | Italy U16 | 1 | (0) |
| 2011–2012 | Italy U17 | 11 | (0) |
| 2012–2013 | Italy U18 | 4 | (0) |
| 2013 | Italy U19 | 4 | (1) |
| 2014–2015 | Italy U20 | 4 | (0) |
- * Club domestic league appearances and goals as of 29 April 2026 ‡ National team caps and goals as of 6 August 2017

Filippo Costa (born 21 May 1995) is an Italian footballer who plays as a left midfielder for Serie B club Vicenza.

== Club career ==
Costa started his career in his native Veneto club Chievo. In July 2015 he was signed by English club Bournemouth. However, in January 2016 he returned to Chievo.

In January 2017 he was loaned to SPAL with an option to buy. In June 2017 SPAL excised the option for €1 million transfer fee.

On 13 July 2019, Costa signed to Napoli. On 15 July 2019, he joined Bari on loan until 30 June 2021. On 18 September 2020, Napoli terminated the Bari loan and sent him on loan to Serie B club Virtus Entella. On 10 January 2022, he joined Parma in Serie B on loan until the end of the season, with an option to buy. On 1 September 2022, Costa was loaned to Foggia.

On 19 July 2023, Costa signed a two-year contract with Vicenza.
