= Francesco Vicari =

Italian footballer

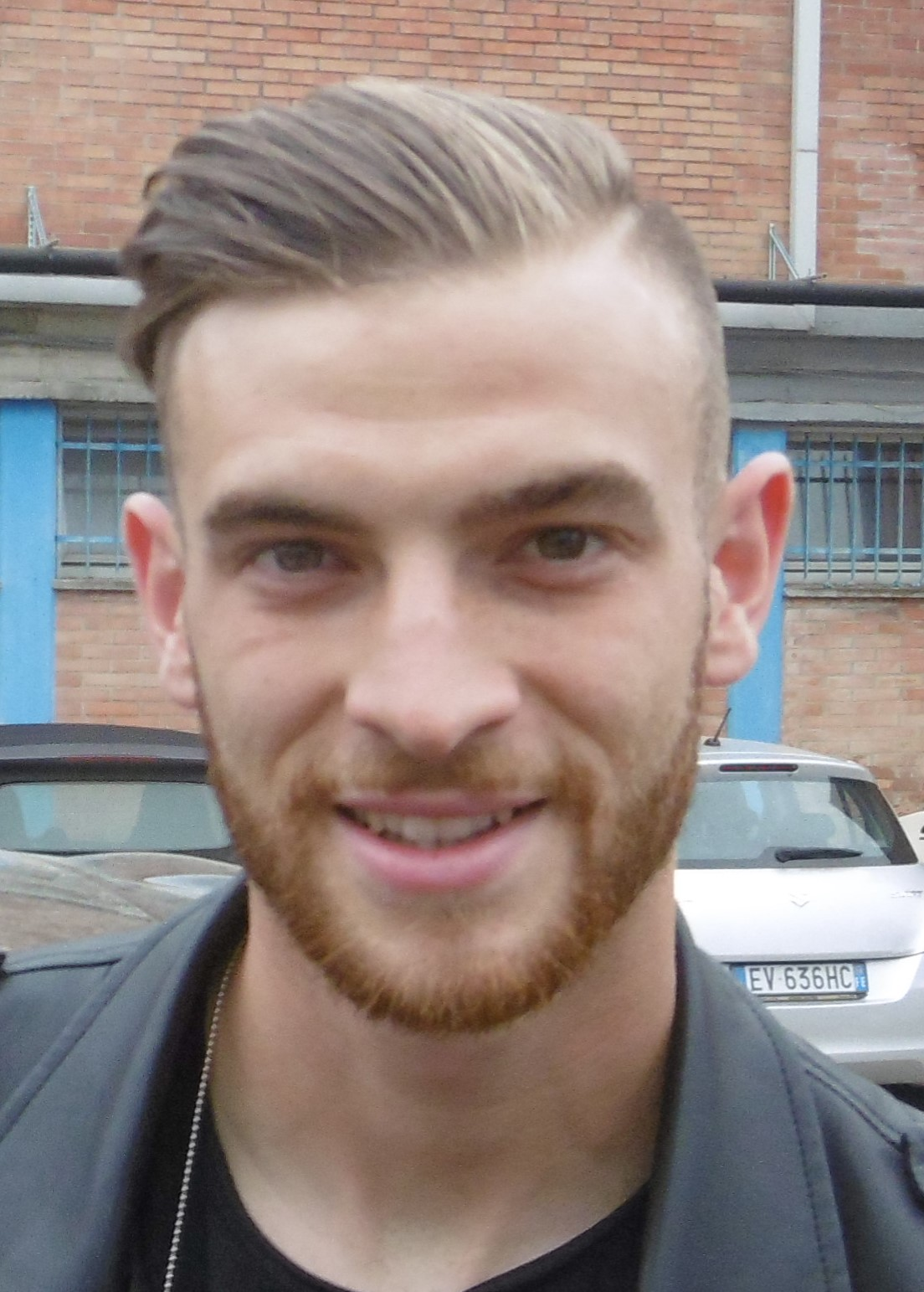

Personal information
- Date of birth: 3 August 1994 (age 32)
- Place of birth: Rome, Italy
- Height: 1.90 m (6 ft 3 in)
- Position: Defender

Team information
- Current team: Bari
- Number: 23

Youth career
- Taranto
- 2012–2013: Novara

Senior career*
Years	Team	Apps	(Gls)
2013–2016	Novara	63	(1)
2016–2022	SPAL	183	(3)
2022–	Bari	104	(1)
2026	→ Reggiana (loan)	7	(1)

International career^{‡}
2014–2015	Italy U20	4	(0)
2015	Italy U21	1	(0)
- * Club domestic league appearances and goals as of 28 August 2026 ‡ National team caps and goals as of 6 May 2022

Francesco Vicari (born 3 August 1994) is an Italian footballer who plays for Serie C Group C club Bari.

== Club career ==
Born in Rome, Lazio region, Vicari was a player of the reserve team of Apulian club Taranto in 2011–12 season. In summer 2012 Vicari became a player of Novara's reserve. Vicari also made his Serie B debut in the last round of 2012–13 Serie B. He became a regular member of the first team since 2013. He followed the club relegated to Lega Pro in 2014 as well as promoted back to Serie B in 2015. In 2015–16 Serie B he wore No. 6 shirt.

On 9 July 2022, Vicari signed a two-year contract with Bari, which would be automatically extended in case of Bari's promotion to Serie A.

On 26 January 2026, Vicari moved on loan to Reggiana.

== Career statistics ==
=== Club ===
As of match played 2 August 2020

Club	Season	League	League		Cup		Europe		Other		Total	
Club	Season	League	Apps	Goals	Apps	Goals	Apps	Goals	Apps	Goals	Apps	Goals
Novara	2012–13	Serie B	1	0	–		–		–		1	0
Novara	2013–14	Serie B	24	0	–		–		1	0	25	0
Novara	2014–15	Lega Pro	24	1	1	0	–		2	0	27	1
Novara	2015–16	Serie B	14	0	1	0	–		1	0	16	0
Novara	Total		63	1	2	0	0	0	4	0	69	1
SPAL	2016–17	Serie B	34	1	–		–		–		34	1
SPAL	2017–18	Serie A	34	0	1	1	–		–		35	1
SPAL	2018–19	Serie A	28	2	1	0	–		–		29	2
SPAL	2019–20	Serie A	34	0	3	0	–		–		37	0
SPAL	Total		130	3	5	1	0	0	0	0	135	4
Career total			193	4	7	1	0	0	4	0	204	5
