= Gabriele Marchegiani =

Italian footballer (born 1996)

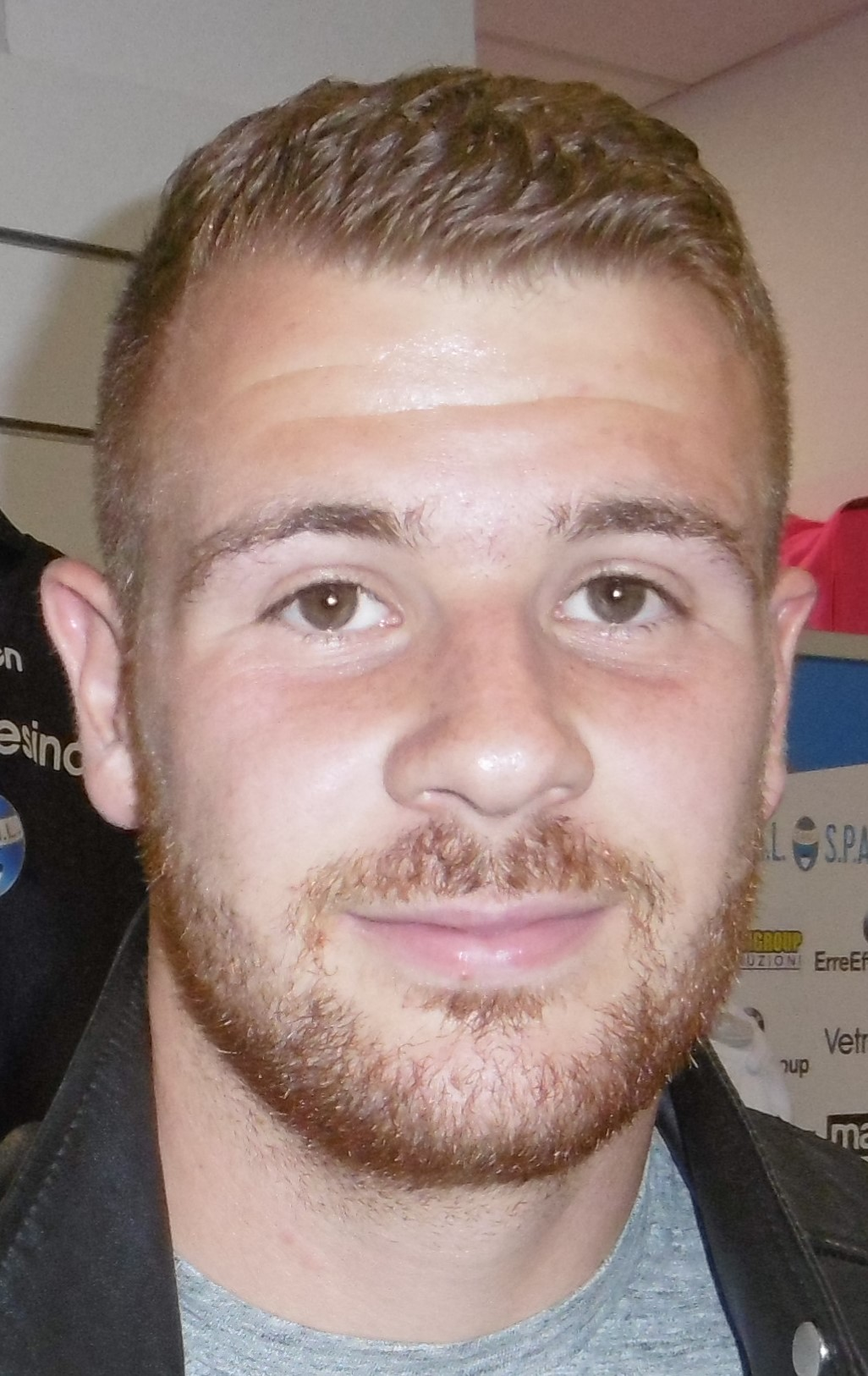
- Marchegiani in 2018

Personal information
- Date of birth: 3 June 1996 (age 30)
- Place of birth: Rome, Italy
- Height: 1.89 m (6 ft 2 1/2 in)
- Position: Goalkeeper

Youth career
- –2015: Roma

Senior career*
Years	Team	Apps	(Gls)
2015–2016	Roma	0	(0)
2015–2016	→ Pistoiese (loan)	0	(0)
2016–2018	SPAL	6	(0)
2018–2019	Gubbio	38	(0)
2019–2020	Novara	23	(0)
2020	→ Ascoli (loan)	0	(0)
2020–2021	Potenza	7	(0)
2021–2023	Trento	51	(0)
2023–2024	Atromitos	7	(0)
2024–2025	Iraklis	6	(0)

International career
2011	Italy U-16	1	(0)
- * Club domestic league appearances and goals as of 8 March 2025

Gabriele Marchegiani (born 3 June 1996) is an Italian professional footballer who plays as a goalkeeper.

== Career ==
Marchegiani made his professional debut in the Serie B for SPAL on 21 November 2016 in a game against Trapani.

On 13 August 2019, he signed a two-year contract with Novara. On 30 January 2020, he was loaned to Ascoli with an option to purchase.

On 8 April 2021, he announced that his contract with Potenza was terminated.

On 9 November 2021, he joined Trento.

== Personal life ==
He is a son of former goalkeeper Luca Marchegiani.
