= Pasquale Schiattarella =

Italian footballer

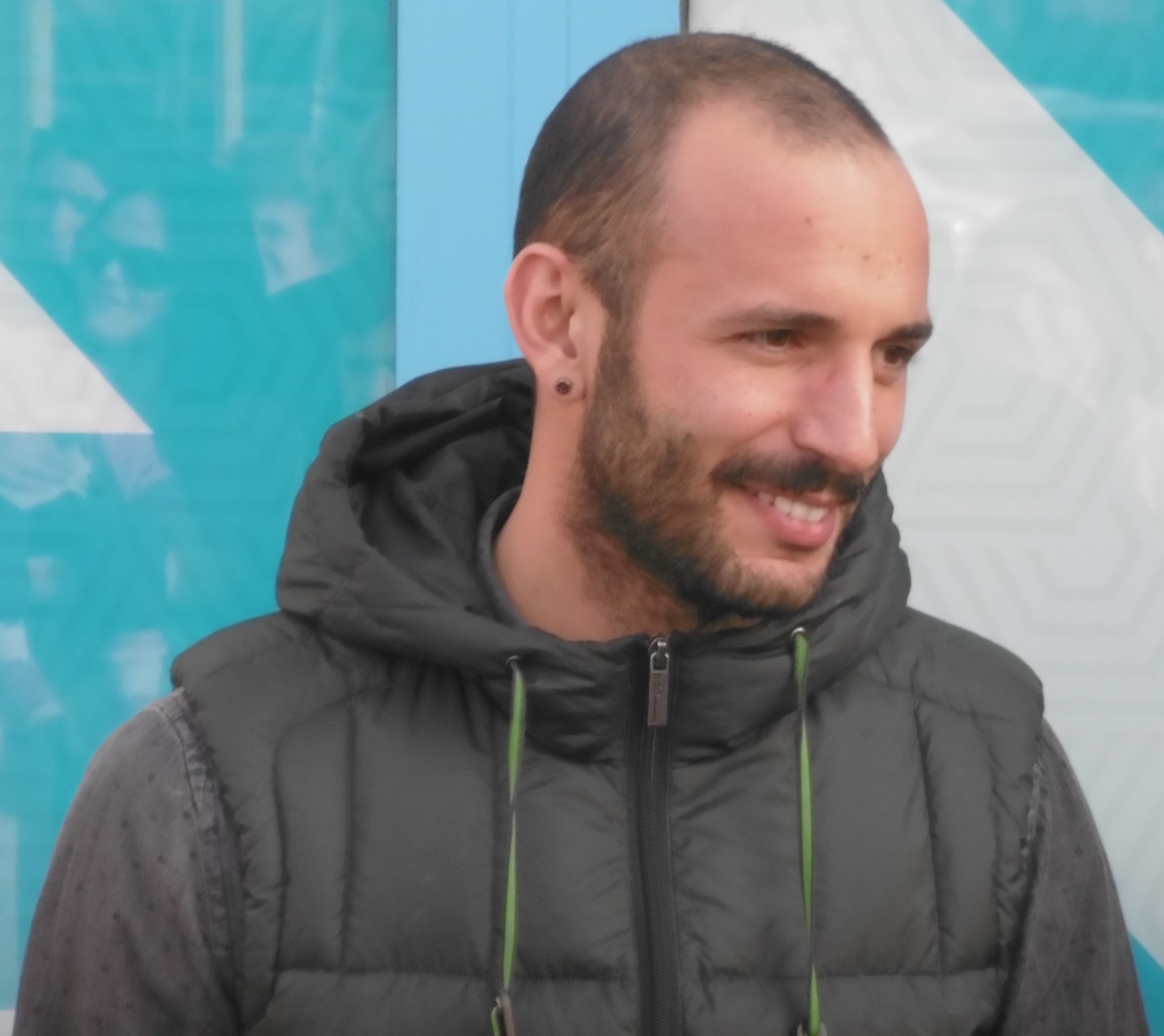

Personal information
- Date of birth: 19 October 1987 (age 39)
- Place of birth: Mugnano di Napoli, Italy
- Height: 1.78 m (5 ft 10 in)
- Position: Midfielder

Youth career
- ?–2005: Torino
- 2005: Sampdoria
- 2006–2007: Torino

Senior career*
Years	Team	Apps	(Gls)
2007–2010	Ancona	58	(6)
2010–2014	Livorno	116	(6)
2014–2015	Spezia	32	(0)
2015	→ Bari (loan)	17	(1)
2015–2016	Latina	35	(3)
2016–2019	SPAL	95	(4)
2019–2021	Benevento	55	(1)
2021–2022	Parma	18	(0)
2022–2023	Benevento	28	(0)
2023–2024	Potenza	24	(0)
- * Club domestic league appearances and goals

Pasquale Schiattarella (born 19 October 1987) is an Italian former footballer who played as a midfielder.

== Career ==
Born in Mugnano di Napoli, Schiattarella started his career at Torino Calcio. Due to financial difficulty, the team originally promoted to Serie A in 2005 was expelled, and a new entity, Torino FC, was formed and re-admitted to 2005–06 Serie B.However, the contract with the old entity became void and Schiattarella was signed by Sampdoria along with Paolo Castellazzi instead of signing a new contract with the new company. However, in January 2006 he returned to Torino.

After A.C. Ancona went bankrupt, he left for Livorno on a free transfer in 2010.

On 14 January 2014, Schiattarella was signed by Spezia for €700,000 transfer fee.

On 29 July 2019, he signed a three-year contract with Benevento.

On 7 August 2021, he moved to Parma on a two-year contract.

On 1 September 2022, Schiattarella returned to Benevento.

On 1 September 2023, Schiattarella signed a two-year contract with Potenza.

On 24 October 2024, Schiattarella terminated his player contract with Potenza by mutual consent and retired from playing. At the same time he was hired as an assistant coach for Potenza's under-19 squad.

== Personal life ==
On 14 January 2021, he tested positive for COVID-19.
