= 2020–21 SPAL season =

SPAL
2020–21 season
- Chairman: Walter Mattioli
- Head coach: Pasquale Marino
- Stadium: Stadio Paolo Mazza
- Serie B: 9th
- Coppa Italia: Quarter-finals
- Top goalscorer: League: Mattia Valoti (11); All: Mattia Valoti (11)
Home colours	Away colours	Third colours
- All statistics correct as of 10 May 2021.

The 2020–21 Società Polisportiva Ars et Labor season was the club's 114th season in existence and the club's first season back in the second division of Italian football. In addition to the domestic league, SPAL participated in this season's edition of the Coppa Italia. The season covers the period from 3 August 2020 to 30 June 2021.

== Players ==
=== First-team squad ===
As of 5 October 2020

Note: Flags indicate national team as defined under FIFA eligibility rules; some limited exceptions apply. Players may hold more than one non-FIFA nationality.

No.	Pos.	Nation	Player
1	GK	ALB	Etrit Berisha
3	DF	ITA	Luca Ranieri (on loan from Fiorentina)
4	DF	SRB	Nenad Tomović
5	DF	POL	Bartosz Salamon
6	MF	ITA	Salvatore Esposito
7	MF	ITA	Simone Missiroli
8	MF	ITA	Mattia Valoti
9	FW	ITA	Alberto Paloschi (vice-captain)
10	FW	ITA	Sergio Floccari (captain)
11	MF	ITA	Alessandro Murgia
12	GK	ITA	Cesare Galeotti
13	MF	EST	Georgi Tunjov
14	FW	ITA	Federico Di Francesco (on loan from Sassuolo)
15	MF	ITA	Federico Zanchetta
17	MF	ITA	Leonardo Sernicola (on loan from Sassuolo)
19	MF	ARG	Lucas Castro
20	DF	ITA	Caleb Okoli (on loan from Atalanta)

No.	Pos.	Nation	Player
21	FW	ITA	Sebastiano Esposito (on loan from Internazionale)
22	GK	SEN	Demba Thiam
23	DF	ITA	Francesco Vicari (third captain)
24	MF	ITA	Federico Viviani
25	DF	ITA	Riccardo Spaltro
27	MF	BRA	Gabriel Strefezza
32	DF	ITA	Marco Sala (on loan from Sassuolo)
41	DF	ITA	Lorenzo Dickmann
77	MF	ITA	Marco D'Alessandro
80	FW	SEN	Demba Seck
89	DF	POL	Jakub Iskra
90	FW	ITA	Luca Moro
94	FW	BOL	Jaume Cuéllar
95	FW	MNE	Marko Janković
97	GK	SEN	Maurice Gomis
98	DF	ITA	Riccardo Mastrilli
99	FW	ITA	Enrico Brignola (on loan from Sassuolo)

=== Out on loan ===
As of 5 October 2020

Note: Flags indicate national team as defined under FIFA eligibility rules; some limited exceptions apply. Players may hold more than one non-FIFA nationality.

No.	Pos.	Nation	Player
—	GK	ITA	Marco Meneghetti (at Südtirol until 30 June 2021)
—	DF	ITA	Kevin Bonifazi (at Udinese until 30 June 2021)
—	DF	BRA	Igor Julio (at Fiorentina until 30 June 2021, obligation to buy)

No.	Pos.	Nation	Player
—	DF	ITA	Paolo Cannistrà (at Cavese until 30 June 2021)
—	MF	ITA	Davide Mazzocco (at Virtus Entella until 30 June 2021)

== Pre-season and friendlies ==
Win Draw Loss Fixtures

19 September 2020 Friendly	Udinese (Italy)	0–1	(Italy) SPAL	Premariacco, Italy
14:30 CEST (UTC+2)				Stadium: Centro Sportivo Premariacco; Attendance: 0

== Competitions ==
=== Overview ===
Competition	First match	Last match	Starting round	Final position	Record							
Competition	First match	Last match	Starting round	Final position	Pld	W	D	L	GF	GA	GD	Win %
Serie B	25 September 2020	10 May 2021	Matchday 1	9th	38	14	14	10	44	42	+2	36.84
Coppa Italia	30 September 2020	27 January 2021	Second round	Quarter-finals	5	2	2	1	5	4	+1	40.00
Total					43	16	16	11	49	46	+3	37.21

Source: Soccerway

=== Serie B ===
Pos	Team	Pld	W	D	L	GF	GA	GD	Pts	Promotion, qualification or relegation
7	Brescia	38	15	11	12	61	53	+8	56 (Note: Head-to-head points: Brescia 9, Chievo 5, SPAL 2.)	Qualification for promotion play-offs preliminary round
8	Chievo (D, R)	38	14	14	10	50	37	+13	56	Bankruptcy
9	SPAL	38	14	14	10	44	42	+2	56	
10	Frosinone	38	12	14	12	38	42	−4	50 (Note: Frosinone finished ahead of Reggina on head-to-head points: Frosinone 1–1 Reggina, Reggina 0–4 Frosinone.)	
11	Reggina	38	12	14	12	42	45	−3	50	

Source: Lega Serie B (in Italian), Soccerway (in English)
Rules for classification: 1) Points; 2) Head-to-head points; 3) Head-to-head goal difference; 4) Goal difference; 5) Goals scored; 6) Draw.
(D) Disqualified; (R) Relegated

==== Results summary ====
Overall								Home						Away					
Pld	W	D	L	GF	GA	GD	Pts	W	D	L	GF	GA	GD	W	D	L	GF	GA	GD
38	14	14	10	44	42	+2	56	8	6	5	25	19	+6	6	8	5	19	23	−4

Source: Serie B

==== Results by round ====
Round	1	2	3	4	5	6	7	8	9	10	11	12	13	14	15	16	17	18	19	20	21	22	23	24	25	26	27	28	29	30	31	32	33	34	35	36	37	38
Ground	A	H	A	A	H	A	H	H	A	H	A	H	A	H	A	H	A	H	A	H	A	H	H	A	H	A	A	H	A	H	A	H	A	H	A	H	A	H
Result	D	D	D	L	W	W	W	W	W	W	L	D	D	W	L	L	W	W	D	D	D	L	D	D	L	D	W	D	L	W	D	D	W	L	L	L	W	W
Position	16	12	12	14	8	7	6	4	4	2	3	4	5	4	5	5	5	3	5	6	6	6	7	8	8	8	8	8	8	7	6	6	6	6	7	9	9	9

Source: Serie B
A = Away; H = Home; W = Win; D = Draw; L = Loss

==== Matches ====
The league fixtures were announced on 9 September 2020.

25 September 2020 1	Monza	0–0	SPAL	Monza
16:45 CEST (UTC+2)	Marić (yellow card) 37'; Gytkjaer (penalty missed) 82'	Report	Valoti (yellow card) 52'; D'Alessandro (yellow card) 58'; Salamon (yellow card) 67'; Gabriel Espeto (yellow card) 69'; Sernicola (yellow card) 75'	Stadium: Stadio Brianteo; Attendance: 956; Referee: Daniele Orsato

3 October 2020 2	SPAL	1–1	Cosenza	Ferrara
16:15 CEST (UTC+2)	Sebastiano Esposito (yellow card) 43'; Salamon 48'; Valoti (yellow card) 85'; Gabriel Espeto (yellow card) 88'	Report	Báez (yellow card) 16'; Sciaudone (yellow card) 37'; Legittimo (yellow card) 43'; Corsi (yellow card) 62'; Sacko (yellow card) 65'; Bittante (yellow card) 74'; Idda (yellow card) 74'; Tiritiello 90+4'	Stadium: Stadio Paolo Mazza; Attendance: 1,000; Referee: Ivan Robilotta

17 October 2020 3	Pordenone	3–3	SPAL	Lignano Sabbiadoro
14:00 CEST (UTC+2)	Diaw 5' 90' (pen.); Barison 18'; Magnino (yellow card) 81'; Falasco (yellow card) 90+4'	Report	Castro 29'; D'Alessandro (yellow card) 32'; Gabriel Espeto 46' (yellow card) 54'; Paloschi 52' (yellow card) 55'; Salamon (yellow card) 68'; Dickmann (yellow card) 88' (yellow-red card) 90+2'	Stadium: Stadio Guido Teghil; Attendance: 459; Referee: Juan Luca Sacchi

20 October 2020 4	Empoli	2–1	SPAL	Empoli
21:00 CEST (UTC+2)	Bandinelli (yellow card) 36'; Bajrami 63'; Mancuso 82'	Report	Esposito 33'	Stadium: Stadio Carlo Castellani; Attendance: 580; Referee: Fabrizio Pasqua

24 October 2020 5	SPAL	3–2	Vicenza	Ferrara
14:00 CEST (UTC+2)	Murgia 38' (yellow card) 66'; Valoti 60'; Sala (yellow card) 74'; Di Francesco (yellow card) 76'; Castro 90+3' (pen.)	Report	Dalmonte 21'; Beruatto (yellow card) 36'; Meggiorini 51'; Longo (yellow card) 77'; Cinelli (yellow card) 90+2'	Stadium: Stadio Paolo Mazza; Attendance: 1,000; Referee: Marco Serra

1 November 2020 6	Reggina	0–1	SPAL	Reggio Calabria
15:00 CET (UTC+1)	Loiacono (yellow card) 12'; Ménez (red card) 23'; Bellomo (yellow card) 33'; Di Chiara (yellow card) 66'	Report	Castro 31' (red card) 90+2'; Valoti (yellow card) 37'; Tomović (yellow card) 60'; Salvatore Esposito (yellow card) 69'; Sala (yellow card) 89'	Stadium: Stadio Oreste Granillo; Attendance: 0 Referee: Giovanni Ayroldi

6 November 2020 7	SPAL	2–0	Salernitana	Ferrara
21:00 CET (UTC+1)	Valoti 6'; Dickmann (yellow card) 36'; Di Francesco 41'; Missiroli (yellow card) 60'; Tomović (yellow card) 81'; Ranieri (yellow card) 90+3'	Report	Di Tacchio (yellow card) 3'; Dziczek (yellow card) 50'; Aya (yellow card) 59'; Giannetti (yellow card) 83'; Tutino (yellow card) 90+2'; Casasola (yellow card) 90+3'	Stadium: Stadio Paolo Mazza; Attendance: 0 Referee: Ivano Pezzuto

21 November 2020 8	SPAL	2–0	Pescara	Ferrara
14:00 CET (UTC+1)	Salamon 28'; Valoti (yellow card) 30'; Salvatore Esposito (yellow card) 60'; Okoli (yellow card) 73'; Sebastiano Esposito 90+4', (yellow card) 90+5'	Report	Balzano (yellow card) 39'; Busellato (yellow card) 71'	Stadium: Stadio Paolo Mazza; Attendance: 0 Referee: Luca Massimi

30 November 2020 9	Virtus Entella	0–1	SPAL	Chiavari
21:00 CET (UTC+1)	Mazzocco (yellow card) 5'; Toscano (yellow card) 44'; Settembrini (yellow card) 75'	Report	Tomović (yellow card) 25'; Di Francesco 59'; Paloschi (yellow card) 78'; Floccari (yellow card) 86'	Stadium: Stadio Comunale; Attendance: 0 Referee: Matteo Marchetti

5 December 2020 10	SPAL	4–0	Pisa	Ferrara
14:00 CET (UTC+1)	Paloschi 14' 17'; Tomović 54'; Di Francesco 59' (yellow card) 67'	Report	Marin (yellow card) 43'; Lisi (yellow card) 62'; Caracciolo (yellow card) 64'	Stadium: Stadio Paolo Mazza; Attendance: 0 Referee: Riccardo Ros

12 December 2020 11	Cittadella	2–0	SPAL	Cittadella
18:00 CET (UTC+1)	Branca (yellow card) 40'; Proia 66'; Rosafio (yellow card) 87'; Gargiulo 88'	Report	Valoti (yellow card) 59'	Stadium: Stadio Pier Cesare Tombolato; Attendance: 0 Referee: Giacomo Camplone

15 December 2020 12	SPAL	0–0	Chievo	Ferrara
21:00 CET (UTC+1)	Gabriel Espeto (yellow card) 9' (yellow-red card) 42'; Tomović (yellow card) 32'	Report	Obi (yellow card) 5'; Canotto (yellow card) 61'	Stadium: Stadio Paolo Mazza; Attendance: 0 Referee: Marco Guida

19 December 2020 13	Venezia	0–0	SPAL	Venice
18:00 CET (UTC+1)	Fiordilino (yellow card) 17'; Capello (yellow card) 37'; Bocalon (yellow card) 64'; Svoboda (yellow card) 66'; Forte (yellow card) 90+3'	Report	Vicari (yellow card) 67'; Fornicola (yellow card) 68'; Salvatore Esposito (yellow card) 90'	Stadium: Stadio Pier Luigi Penzo; Attendance: 0 Referee: Marco Serra

22 December 2020 14	SPAL	1–0	Lecce	Ferrara
19:00 CET (UTC+1)	Tomović (yellow card) 40'; Valoti (yellow card) 43'; Espeto 79'	Report	Coda (yellow card) 46'; Lucioni (yellow card) 90'	Stadium: Stadio Paolo Mazza; Attendance: 0 Referee: Daniele Doveri

27 December 2020 15	Ascoli	2–0	SPAL	Ascoli Piceno
15:00 CET (UTC+1)	Sabiri 28', 75'; Büchel (yellow card) 63'; Pucino (yellow card) 84'; Eramo (yellow card) 88'	Report	Valoti (yellow card) 25'; Esposito (yellow card) 69'; Thiam (yellow card) 76'	Stadium: Stadio Cino e Lillo Del Duca; Attendance: 0 Referee: Rosario Abisso

30 December 2020 16	SPAL	2–3	Brescia	Ferrara
18:30 CET (UTC+1)	Valoti 7', 57'; Vicari (yellow card) 48'; Ranieri (yellow card) 90+3'	Report	Jagiełło 56'; Łabojko (yellow card) 61'; Donnarumma 70' (pen.); Bjarnason 87'; Ghezzi (red card) 90+2'	Stadium: Stadio Paolo Mazza; Attendance: 0 Referee: Federico Dionisi

4 January 2021 17	Frosinone	1–2	SPAL	Frosinone
18:30 CET (UTC+1)	Kastanos 25', (yellow card) 90'	Report	Esposito 40'; Tomović (yellow card) 52'; Paloschi 86'	Stadium: Stadio Benito Stirpe; Attendance: 0 Referee: Simone Sozza

18 January 2021 18	SPAL	2–0	Reggiana	Ferrara
21:00 CET (UTC+1)	Valoti 38'; Flocarri (yellow card) 57'; D'Alessandro 80'	Report	Lunetta (yellow card) 44'; Martinelli (yellow card) 49'; Kargbo (yellow card) 82'	Stadium: Stadio Paolo Mazza; Attendance: 0 Referee: Antonio Giua

24 January 2021 19	Cremonese	1–1	SPAL	Cremona
21:00 CET (UTC+1)	Castagnetti (yellow card) 10'; Bartolomei (yellow card) 60'; Ciofani 85'; Terranova (yellow card) 90'	Report	Paloschi 63'; Tomović (yellow card) 76'	Stadium: Stadio Giovanni Zini; Attendance: 0 Referee: Ivan Robilotta

30 January 2021 20	SPAL	1–1	Monza	Ferrara
16:00 CET (UTC+1)	Valoti 30', (yellow card) 31'; Mora (yellow card) 41'; Vicari (yellow card) 55'; Sala (yellow card) 77'; Missiroli (yellow card) 87'	Report	Gytkjær 13', (yellow card) 34'; Barillà (yellow card) 41'; Bellusci (yellow card) 47'; Ricci (yellow card) 85'	Stadium: Stadio Paolo Mazza; Attendance: 0 Referee: Livio Marinelli

6 February 2021 21	Cosenza	1–1	SPAL	Cosenza
14:00 CET (UTC+1)	Gerbo (yellow card) 10'; Sciaudone 25'	Report	Valoti (yellow card) 30'; Mora 57'; Okoli (yellow card) 79'	Stadium: Stadio San Vito-Gigi Marulla; Attendance: 0 Referee: Euguenio Abbattista

9 February 2021 22	SPAL	1–3	Pordenone	Ferrara
19:00 CET (UTC+1)	Segre (yellow card) 31'; Paloschi 41'; Tomović (yellow card) 44'; Valoti (yellow card) 83'	Report	Butić 32', (yellow card) 65'; Ciurria 56'; Biondi (yellow card) 78'; Zammarini 90+1'	Stadium: Stadio Paolo Mazza; Attendance: 0 Referee: Marco Di Bello

13 February 2021 23	SPAL	1–1	Empoli	Ferrara
16:00 CET (UTC+1)	Gabriel Espeto (yellow card) 19'; Paloschi (yellow card) 43'; Esposito 78' (pen.)	Report	Parisi (yellow card) 23'; Mancuso 27'	Stadium: Stadio Paolo Mazza; Attendance: 0 Referee: Maurizio Mariani

20 February 2021 24	Vicenza	2–2	SPAL	Vicenza
14:00 CET (UTC+1)	Vandeputte (yellow card) 34'; Padella (yellow card) 40'; Pontisso (yellow card) 64'; Pasini 70'; Giacomelli (yellow card) 71'; Meggiorini 75'; Beruatto (yellow card) 90+3'	Report	Paloschi 28'; Valoti 42' (pen.); Ranieri (yellow card) 53'; Vicari (yellow card) 57'; Tomović (yellow card) 90+3'	Stadium: Stadio Romeo Menti; Attendance: 0 Referee: Matteo Gariglio

27 February 2021 25	SPAL	1–4	Reggina	Ferrara
14:00 CET (UTC+1)		Report		Stadium: Stadio Paolo Mazza; Attendance: 0 Referee: Alessandro Prontera

2 March 2021 26	Salernitana	0–0	SPAL	Salerno
19:00 CET (UTC+1)				Stadium: Stadio Arechi

6 March 2021 27	Pescara	0–1	SPAL	Pescara
14:00 CET (UTC+1)			Valoti 9' (pen.)	Stadium: Stadio Adriatico; Referee: Federico La Penna

12 March 2021 28	SPAL	0–0	Virtus Entella	Ferrara
21:00 CET (UTC+1)				Stadium: Stadio Paolo Mazza

15 March 2021 29	Pisa	3–0	SPAL	Pisa
21:00 CET (UTC+1)				Stadium: Arena Garibaldi

20 March 2021 30	SPAL	1–0	Cittadella	Ferrara
18:00 CET (UTC+1)				Stadium: Stadio Paolo Mazza

2 April 2021 31	Chievo	1–1	SPAL	Verona
19:00 CEST (UTC+2)				Stadium: Stadio Marcantonio Bentegodi

5 April 2021 32	SPAL	1–1	Venezia	Ferrara
19:00 CEST (UTC+2)				Stadium: Stadio Paolo Mazza

10 April 2021 33	Lecce	1–2	SPAL	Lecce
14:00 CEST (UTC+2)				Stadium: Stadio Via del Mare

16 April 2021 34	SPAL	1–2	Ascoli	Ferrara
21:00 CEST (UTC+2)				Stadium: Stadio Paolo Mazza

1 May 2021 35	Brescia	3–1	SPAL	Brescia
14:00 CEST (UTC+2)				Stadium: Stadio Mario Rigamonti

4 May 2021 36	SPAL	0–1	Frosinone	Ferrara
14:00 CEST (UTC+2)				Stadium: Stadio Paolo Mazza

7 May 2021 37	Reggiana	1–2	SPAL	Reggio Emilia
14:00 CEST (UTC+2)				Stadium: Mapei Stadium – Città del Tricolore

10 May 2021 38	SPAL	1–0	Cremonese	Ferrara
14:00 CEST (UTC+2)				Stadium: Stadio Paolo Mazza

=== Coppa Italia ===
30 September 2020 Second round	SPAL	0–0 (a.e.t.) (4–2 p)	Bari	Ferrara
21:00 CEST (UTC+2)		Report		Stadium: Stadio Paolo Mazza; Referee: Simone Sozza
	Penalties
	Sa. Esposito (penalty scored); Janković (penalty scored); Floccari (penalty missed); Se. Esposito (penalty scored); Tomović (penalty scored)		(penalty scored) Antenucci; (penalty scored) Marras; (penalty missed) Candellone; (penalty missed) Minelli

28 October 2020 Third round	Crotone	1–1 (a.e.t.) (3–4 p)	SPAL	Crotone
17:00 CET (UTC+1)	Cigarini 107' (pen.); Eduardo (yellow card) 118'	Report	Okoli (yellow card) 72'; Sa. Esposito (yellow card) 80'; Ranieri (yellow card) 103'; Seck 113'	Stadium: Stadio Ezio Scida; Referee: Matteo Marchetti
	Penalties
	Siligardi (penalty scored); Crociata (penalty missed); Molina (penalty scored); Golemić (penalty scored); Cigarini (penalty missed)		(penalty scored) Sa. Esposito; (penalty scored) Missiroli; (penalty missed) Sala; (penalty scored) Se. Esposito; (penalty scored) Ranieri

24 November 2020 Fourth round	SPAL	2–0	Monza	Ferrara
14:30 CET (UTC+1)	Paloschi 62' (pen.); Brignola 75'	Report		Stadium: Stadio Paolo Mazza; Referee: Marco Piccinini

14 January 2021 Round of 16	Sassuolo	0–2	SPAL	Reggio Emilia
17:30 CET (UTC+1)	Đuričić (red card) 47'; Müldür (yellow card) 66'	Report	Missiroli 49'; Dickmann 58'	Stadium: Mapei Stadium; Referee: Giacomo Camplone

27 January 2021 Quarter-finals	Juventus	4–0	SPAL	Turin
20:45 CET (UTC+1)	Morata 16' (pen.); Frabotta 33'; Kulusevski 78'; Chiesa (yellow card) 81', (goal) 90+4'; Rabiot (yellow card) 85'	Report	Sernicola (yellow card) 50'; Valoti (yellow card) 80'	Stadium: Juventus Stadium; Referee: Ivano Pezzuto

== Statistics ==
=== Appearances and goals ===
No.	Pos	Nat	Player	Total		Serie A		Coppa Italia	
No.	Pos	Nat	Player	Apps	Goals	Apps	Goals	Apps	Goals
Goalkeepers
1	GK	(Albania) ALB	Etrit Berisha	27	0	25	0	2	0
12	GK	(Italy) ITA	Cesare Galeotti	0	0	0	0	0	0
22	GK	(Senegal) SEN	Demba Thiam	16	0	13	0	3	0
97	GK	(Senegal) SEN	Maurice Gomis	0	0	0	0	0	0
Defenders
3	DF	(Italy) ITA	Luca Ranieri	30	0	23+3	0	3+1	0
4	DF	(Serbia) SRB	Nenad Tomović	38	1	30+4	1	0+4	0
5	DF	(Poland) POL	Bartosz Salamon	14	2	9+4	2	1	0
20	DF	(Italy) ITA	Caleb Okoli	19	1	16	1	3	0
23	DF	(Italy) ITA	Francesco Vicari	27	0	25	0	2	0
25	DF	(Italy) ITA	Riccardo Spaltro	6	0	0+2	0	4	0
32	DF	(Italy) ITA	Marco Sala	32	0	18+9	0	2+3	0
41	DF	(Italy) ITA	Lorenzo Dickmann	35	1	21+10	0	2+2	1
89	DF	(Poland) POL	Jakub Iskra	0	0	0	0	0	0
98	DF	(Italy) ITA	Riccardo Mastrilli	0	0	0	0	0	0
Midfielders
6	MF	(Italy) ITA	Salvatore Esposito	34	5	26+5	5	3	0
7	MF	(Italy) ITA	Simone Missiroli	36	1	20+11	0	4+1	1
8	MF	(Italy) ITA	Mattia Valoti	31	11	27+2	11	0+2	0
11	MF	(Italy) ITA	Alessandro Murgia	27	1	8+15	1	4	0
13	MF	(Estonia) EST	Georgi Tunjov	1	0	0	0	1	0
15	MF	(Italy) ITA	Federico Zanchetta	1	0	0	0	0+1	0
17	MF	(Italy) ITA	Leonardo Sernicola	34	0	21+8	0	5	0
19	MF	(Italy) ITA	Luca Mora	17	1	14+3	1	0	0
24	MF	(Italy) ITA	Federico Viviani	5	0	3	0	2	0
27	MF	(Brazil) BRA	Espeto	31	4	19+10	4	1+1	0
77	MF	(Italy) ITA	Marco D'Alessandro	13	1	9+3	1	1	0
Forwards
9	FW	(Italy) ITA	Alberto Paloschi	28	8	20+6	7	1+1	1
10	FW	(Italy) ITA	Sergio Floccari	26	1	10+13	1	2+1	0
14	FW	(Italy) ITA	Federico Di Francesco	28	4	18+9	4	1	0
21	FW	(Italy) ITA	Sebastiano Esposito	13	1	5+5	1	2+1	0
29	FW	(Spain) ESP	Raúl Asencio	13	0	8+5	0	0	0
80	FW	(Senegal) SEN	Andrea Petagna	11	1	2+5	0	1+3	1
90	FW	(Italy) ITA	Luca Moro	10	0	1+7	0	1+1	0
93	FW	(Italy) ITA	Marco Tumminello	5	0	0+5	0	0	0
94	FW	(Bolivia) BOL	Jaume Cuéllar	0	0	0	0	0	0
95	FW	(Montenegro) MNE	Marko Janković	3	0	1+1	0	0+1	0
99	FW	(Italy) ITA	Enrico Brignola	13	1	1+8	0	4	1
Players transferred out during the season
5	DF	(Italy) ITA	Jacopo Segre	18	0	11+7	0	0	0
19	MF	(Argentina) ARG	Lucas Castro	13	3	9+2	3	2	0

Last updated: 10 May 2021
Source: Competitions
