= 2021–22 SPAL season =

Italian football results

SPAL
- Chairman: Joe Tacopina
- Head coach: Roberto Venturato
- Stadium: Stadio Paolo Mazza
- Serie B: 15th
- Coppa Italia: First round

The 2021–22 season was S.P.A.L.'s second consecutive season in second division of the Italian football league, the Serie B, and the 115th as a football club.

== Players ==
=== First-team quad ===
As of 18 February 2022

Note: Flags indicate national team as defined under FIFA eligibility rules; some limited exceptions apply. Players may hold more than one non-FIFA nationality.

No.	Pos.	Nation	Player
1	GK	ITA	Alberto Pomini
2	DF	LBR	Mark Pabai
3	DF	ITA	Alessandro Tripaldelli (on loan from Cagliari)
5	MF	ITA	Salvatore Esposito
6	DF	ITA	Biagio Meccariello
7	MF	ITA	Giovanni Crociata (on loan from Empoli)
8	MF	ITA	Marco Mancosu
9	FW	ITA	Lorenzo Colombo (on loan from Milan)
10	MF	ITA	Niccolò Zanellato
11	FW	ITA	Federico Melchiorri (on loan from Perugia)
14	MF	ARG	Franco Zuculini
16	DF	ITA	Filippo Saiani
17	DF	ITA	Elio Capradossi (on loan from Spezia)
18	FW	ITA	Mattia Finotto
19	MF	ITA	Luca Mora
20	FW	ISL	Mikael Egill Ellertsson (on loan from Spezia)
22	GK	SEN	Demba Thiam

No.	Pos.	Nation	Player
23	DF	ITA	Francesco Vicari (captain)
24	DF	ITA	Lorenzo Dickmann
27	DF	ITA	Alberto Almici
28	FW	ITA	Luca Vido (on loan from Atalanta)
29	DF	POL	Patryk Peda
32	MF	ITA	Marco Pinato (on loan from Sassuolo)
40	MF	ITA	Jacopo Da Riva (on loan from Atalanta)
49	FW	ITA	Giuseppe Rossi
54	GK	ITA	Enrico Alfonso
77	MF	ITA	Federico Viviani
79	DF	ITA	Moustapha Yabre
87	DF	CZE	David Heidenreich (on loan from Atalanta)
91	DF	ITA	Raffaele Celia
95	DF	GER	Steven Nador
97	FW	ITA	Ludovico D'Orazio
99	FW	CIV	Emmanuel Latte Lath (on loan from Atalanta)

=== Out on loan ===
As of 18 February 2022

Note: Flags indicate national team as defined under FIFA eligibility rules; some limited exceptions apply. Players may hold more than one non-FIFA nationality.

No.	Pos.	Nation	Player
—	GK	ITA	Cesare Galeotti (at Pergolettese)
—	GK	ITA	Marco Meneghetti (at Gubbio)
—	DF	POL	Jakub Iskra (at Śląsk Wrocław)
—	DF	ITA	Riccardo Spaltro (at Renate)
—	MF	ITA	Emmanuel Cuomo (at Nocerina)
—	MF	ITA	Federico Zanchetta (at Lucchese)

No.	Pos.	Nation	Player
—	MF	ITA	Alessandro Murgia (at Perugia)
—	MF	MAR	Ayoub Abou (at Tsarsko Selo Sofia)
—	MF	EST	Georgi Tunjov (at Carrarese)
—	MF	ITA	Mattia Valoti (at Monza, obligation to buy)
—	FW	ITA	Federico Di Francesco (at Empoli, right to buy)

== Pre-season and friendlies ==
Win Draw Loss Fixtures

31 July 2021 Friendly	SPAL (Italy)	6–0	(Italy) Pontedera	Ferrara, Italy
18:00 CEST (UTC+2)				Stadium: Centro Sportivo Giovan Battista Fabbri

6 August 2021 Friendly	SPAL (Italy)	1–2	(Italy) Cremonese	Ferrara, Italy
18:00 CEST (UTC+2)				Stadium: Stadio Paolo Mazza

6 August 2021 Friendly	SPAL (Italy)	Cancelled	(Italy) Hellas Verona	Ferrara, Italy
19:30 CEST (UTC+2)				Stadium: Stadio Paolo Mazza

10 August 2021 Friendly	SPAL (Italy)	5–0	(Italy) Adriese	Ferrara, Italy
18:30 CEST (UTC+2)				Stadium: Stadio Paolo Mazza

5 September 2021 Friendly	SPAL (Italy)	6–2	(Italy) Rimini	Ferrara, Italy
14:00 CEST (UTC+2)				Stadium: Stadio Paolo Mazza

== Competitions ==
=== Overall record ===
Competition	First match	Last match	Starting round	Final position	Record							
Competition	First match	Last match	Starting round	Final position	Pld	W	D	L	GF	GA	GD	Win %
Serie B	22 August 2021	6 May 2022	Matchday 1	15th	38	9	15	14	46	54	−8	23.68
Coppa Italia	14 August 2021		First round	First round	1	0	0	1	1	2	−1	0.00
Total					39	9	15	15	47	56	−9	23.08

Last updated: 6 May 2022
Source: Soccerway

=== Serie A ===
==== League table ====
Pos	Team	Pld	W	D	L	GF	GA	GD	Pts	Promotion, qualification or relegation
13	Como	38	11	14	13	49	54	−5	47	
14	Reggina (Note: Reggina were deducted 2 points for administrative irregularities.)	38	13	9	16	31	49	−18	46	
15	SPAL	38	9	15	14	46	54	−8	42	
16	Cosenza (O)	38	8	11	19	36	59	−23	35	Qualification for relegation play-out
17	Vicenza (R)	38	9	7	22	38	59	−21	34 (Note: Vicenza finished ahead of Alessandria on head-to-head points: Vicenza 2–1 Alessandria, Alessandria 0–1 Vicenza.)	Qualification for relegation play-out

Source: Lega Serie B (in Italian), Soccerway (in English)
Rules for classification: 1) Points; 2) Head-to-head points; 3) Head-to-head goal difference; 4) Goal difference; 5) Goals scored; 6) Draw.
(O) Play-off winners; (R) Relegated

==== Results summary ====
Overall								Home						Away					
Pld	W	D	L	GF	GA	GD	Pts	W	D	L	GF	GA	GD	W	D	L	GF	GA	GD
38	9	15	14	46	54	−8	42	4	8	7	30	28	+2	5	7	7	16	26	−10

Last updated: 6 May 2022.
Source: Serie B

==== Results by round ====
Round	1	2	3	4	5	6	7	8	9	10	11	12	13	14	15	16	17	18	19	20	21	22	23	24	25	26	27	28	29	30	31	32	33	34	35	36	37	38
Ground																																						
Result	L	W	D	L	W	L	D	D	D	W	L	D	L	W	L	W	L	L	D	D	D	L	L	D	W	L	D	W	L	D	L	D	D	L	D	D	W	W
Position	17	9	10	13	11	14	14	15	14	12	15	15	16	15	15	14	14	15	15	15	14	15	16	15	15	15	15	15	15	15	15	15	15	15	15	15	15	15

Updated to match(es) played on 6 May 2022. Source: Serie B
A = Away; H = Home; W = Win; D = Draw; L = Loss

==== Matches ====
The league fixtures were announced on 24 July 2021.
