= 2019–20 SPAL season =

SPAL
2019–20 season
- President: Walter Mattioli
- Manager: Leonardo Semplici (until 10 February); Luigi Di Biagio (from 10 February)
- Stadium: Stadio Paolo Mazza
- Serie A: 20th (relegated)
- Coppa Italia: Round of 16
- Top goalscorer: League: Andrea Petagna (12); All: Andrea Petagna (12)
Home colours	Away colours	Third colours

The 2019–20 season was SPAL's third season in the top-flight of Italian football since 1968. After being promoted as champions of Serie B in the 2016–17 season, SPAL finished just above the relegation places in 17th during the 2017–18 season, and in 13th place during the 2018–19 Serie A season.

The season was coach Leonardo Semplici's sixth in charge of the club, after taking over in December 2014. On 10 June 2019 Semplici and his staff extended their contracts with the club to June 2021.

== Players ==
=== Squad information ===
As of 5 October 2019

No.	Name	Nat	Position(s)	Date of birth (age)	Signed from	Signed in	Contract ends	Apps.	Goals	Notes
Goalkeepers
22	Demba Thiam	(Senegal)	GK	9 March 1998 (age 28)	(Italy) Youth Sector	2017	2020	0	0	
25	Karlo Letica	(Croatia)	GK	11 February 1997 (age 29)	(Belgium) Club Brugge	2019	2020	0	0	Loan
99	Etrit Berisha	(Albania)	GK	10 March 1989 (age 37)	(Italy) Atalanta	2019	2020	7	0	Loan
Defenders
3	Igor	(Brazil)	CB	7 February 1998 (age 28)	(Austria) Red Bull Salzburg	2019	2023	5	0	
4	Thiago Cionek	(Poland)	CB	21 April 1986 (age 40)	(Italy) Palermo	2018	2020	51	1	
13	Arkadiusz Reca	(Poland)	LB	17 June 1995 (age 31)	(Italy) Atalanta	2019	2020	4	0	Loan
23	Francesco Vicari	(Italy)	CB	3 August 1994 (age 32)	(Italy) Novara	2016	2022	103	3	
24	Lorenzo Dickmann	(Italy)	RB / RWB	24 September 1996 (age 29)	(Italy) Novara	2018	2022	6	0	
26	Jacopo Sala	(Italy)	RB / CM	5 December 1991 (age 34)	(Italy) Sampdoria	2019	2020	4	0	Loan
27	Felipe	(Brazil)	CB	31 July 1984 (age 42)	(Italy) Udinese	2017	2020	65	4	
40	Nenad Tomović	(Serbia)	CB / RB / LB	30 August 1987 (age 39)	(Italy) Chievo	2019	2020	6	0	
Midfielders
6	Mirko Valdifiori	(Italy)	DM	21 April 1986 (age 40)	(Italy) Torino	2018	2020	18	0	
7	Simone Missiroli	(Italy)	CM	23 May 1986 (age 40)	(Italy) Sassuolo	2018	2021	41	0	
8	Mattia Valoti	(Italy)	CM / AM	6 September 1993 (age 33)	(Italy) Hellas Verona	2018	2021	28	2	
11	Alessandro Murgia	(Italy)	CM / AM	9 August 1996 (age 30)	(Italy) Lazio	2019	2024	20	0	
19	Jasmin Kurtić	(Slovenia)	CM	10 January 1989 (age 37)	(Italy) Atalanta	2018	2022	52	8	
21	Espeto	(Brazil)	RM / AM / LM	18 April 1997 (age 29)	(Italy) Youth Sector	2017	2022	7	0	
77	Marco D'Alessandro	(Italy)	RM / LM / RW	17 February 1991 (age 35)	(Italy) Atalanta	2019	2020	4	0	Loan
93	Mohamed Fares	(Algeria)	LM / LWB / LW	15 February 1996 (age 30)	(Italy) Hellas Verona	2018	2022	35	3	
Forwards
9	Gabriele Moncini	(Italy)	ST	26 April 1996 (age 30)	(Italy) Cesena	2018	2022	2	0	
10	Sergio Floccari	(Italy)	ST	12 November 1981 (age 44)	(Italy) Bologna	2017	2020	64	13	
31	Federico Di Francesco	(Italy)	LW / RW / AM	14 June 1994 (age 32)	(Italy) Sassuolo	2019	2020	5	2	Loan
37	Andrea Petagna	(Italy)	ST	30 June 1995 (age 31)	(Italy) Atalanta	2018	2023	43	19	
43	Alberto Paloschi	(Italy)	ST	4 January 1990 (age 36)	(Italy) Atalanta	2017	2021	61	9	
95	Marko Janković	(Montenegro)	LW	9 July 1995 (age 31)	(Serbia) Partizan	2019	2022	2	0	

== Transfers ==
=== In ===
Date	Pos.	Player	Age	Moving from	Fee	Notes	Source

==== Loans in ====
Date	Pos.	Player	Age	Moving from	Fee	Notes	Source
6 July 2019	GK	(Albania) Etrit Berisha	25	(Italy) Atalanta	Loan	Loan with an obligation to buy	
10 July 2019	MF	(Italy) Marco D'Alessandro	28	(Italy) Atalanta	Loan	Loan with an option to buy	
28 August 2019	DF	(Poland) Arkadiusz Reca	24	(Italy) Atalanta	Loan	Loan with an option to buy and counter-option	

=== Out ===
Date	Pos.	Player	Age	Moving to	Fee	Notes	Source
12 July 2019	MF	(Italy) Manuel Lazzari	25	(Italy) Lazio	€10M	€10M + Alessandro Murgia	
13 July 2019	DF	(Italy) Filippo Costa	24	(Italy) Napoli	Undisclosed		

==== Loans out ====
Date	Pos.	Player	Age	Moving to	Fee	Notes	Source
16 July 2019	MF	(Italy) Mattia Vitale	21	(Italy) Frosinone	Loan	Loan with an obligation to buy	

== Pre-season and friendlies ==
17 July 2019 Friendly	SPAL (Italy)	3–1	(Slovenia) Gorica	Tarvisio, Italy
20:00 CEST	Paloschi 17', 32'; Dickmann 24'	Report	Marinič 6'	Stadium: Polisportivo Comunale di Tarvisio; Referee: Andrea Bordin

21 July 2019 Friendly	SPAL (Italy)	2–0	(Italy) Pordenone	Tarvisio, Italy
19:00 CEST	Valoti 24'; Petagna 35'	Report		Stadium: Polisportivo Comunale di Tarvisio; Referee: Daniel Amabile

4 August 2019 Friendly	SPAL (Italy)	0–0	(Italy) Verona	Trento, Italy
19:00 CEST		Report		Stadium: Stadio Briamasco; Referee: Riccardo Ros

8 August 2019 Friendly	Cesena (Italy)	2–3	(Italy) SPAL	Cesena, Italy
20:30 CEST	Sabato 16'; De Feudis 87'	Report	Di Francesco 6'; Petagna 14'; Floccari 64'	Stadium: Stadio Dino Manuzzi; Attendance: 2,037; Referee: Daniele Paterna

== Competitions ==
=== Serie A ===
==== League table ====
Pos	Team	Pld	W	D	L	GF	GA	GD	Pts	Qualification or relegation
16	Torino	38	11	7	20	46	68	−22	40	
17	Genoa	38	10	9	19	47	73	−26	39	
18	Lecce (R)	38	9	8	21	52	85	−33	35	Relegation to Serie B
19	Brescia (R)	38	6	7	25	35	79	−44	25	Relegation to Serie B
20	SPAL (R)	38	5	5	28	27	77	−50	20	Relegation to Serie B

Source: Serie A, Soccerway
Rules for classification: 1) Points; 2) Head-to-head points; 3) Head-to-head goal difference; 4) Goal difference; 5) Goals scored; 6) Draw. (Note: Head-to-head record is used only after all the matches between the teams in question have been played)
(R) Relegated

==== Results summary ====
Overall								Home						Away					
Pld	W	D	L	GF	GA	GD	Pts	W	D	L	GF	GA	GD	W	D	L	GF	GA	GD
38	5	5	28	27	77	−50	20	2	4	13	16	40	−24	3	1	15	11	37	−26

Last updated: 2 August 2020.
Source: Competitive matches

==== Results by round ====
Round	1	2	3	4	5	6	7	8	9	10	11	12	13	14	15	16	17	18	19	20	21	22	23	24	25	26	27	28	29	30	31	32	33	34	35	36	37	38
Ground	H	A	H	A	H	A	H	A	H	A	H	A	H	A	H	A	A	H	A	A	H	A	H	A	H	A	H	A	H	A	H	A	H	A	H	H	A	H
Result	L	L	W	L	L	L	W	L	D	L	L	D	D	L	L	L	W	L	L	W	L	L	L	L	L	W	L	L	D	L	L	L	L	L	L	D	L	L
Position	14	17	16	17	19	19	17	19	19	19	20	19	19	19	20	20	19	20	20	18	18	20	20	20	20	19	19	19	19	20	20	20	20	20	20	20	20	20

Updated to match(es) played on 2 August 2020. Source: Competitive matches
A = Away; H = Home; W = Win; D = Draw; L = Loss

==== Matches ====
25 August 2019 1	SPAL	2–3	Atalanta	Ferrara
20:45 CEST (UTC+02:00)	Di Francesco 7'; Petagna 27'; Valoti (yellow card) 61'; Cionek (yellow card) 90+3'	Report	Gosens 34'; De Roon (yellow card) 43'; Muriel 71', 76'	Stadium: Stadio Paolo Mazza; Attendance: 11,706; Referee: Gianluca Manganiello

30 August 2019 2	Bologna	1–0	SPAL	Bologna
20:45 CEST (UTC+02:00)	Danilo (yellow card) 39'; Medel (yellow card) 60'; Santander (yellow card) 90'; Soriano 90+3'	Report	Missiroli (yellow card) 50'; Igor (yellow card) 61'	Stadium: Stadio Renato Dall'Ara; Attendance: 25,086; Referee: Marco Di Bello

15 September 2019 3	SPAL	2–1	Lazio	Ferrara
15:00 CEST (UTC+02:00)	Tomović (yellow card) 16'; Missiroli (yellow card) 51'; Petagna 63'; Strefezza (yellow card) 64'; Felipe (yellow card) 85'; Kurtić 90+2'; Di Francesco (yellow card) 90+6'	Report	Immobile 17' (pen.); Patric (yellow card) 26'; Radu (yellow card) 79'; Acerbi (yellow card) 89'	Stadium: Stadio Paolo Mazza; Attendance: 13,650; Referee: Gianpaolo Calvarese

22 September 2019 4	Sassuolo	3–0	SPAL	Reggio Emilia
12:30 CEST (UTC+02:00)	Traorè (yellow card) 5'; Ferrari (yellow card) 16'; Caputo 26', 45+2'; Duncan 47'; Peluso (yellow card) 53'	Report	Tomović (yellow card) 37'; Kurtić (yellow card) 69'	Stadium: Mapei Stadium – Città del Tricolore; Attendance: 10,937; Referee: Maurizio Mariani

25 September 2019 5	SPAL	1–3	Lecce	Ferrara
21:00 CEST (UTC+02:00)	Di Francesco 17'; Igor (yellow card) 70'	Report	Babacar (yellow card) 6'; Mancosu 11' (pen.), 73' (pen.); Calderoni (yellow card) 34', (goal) 47'	Stadium: Stadio Paolo Mazza; Attendance: 13,292; Referee: Gianluca Rocchi

28 September 2019 6	Juventus	2–0	SPAL	Turin
15:00 CEST (UTC+02:00)	Khedira (yellow card) 32'; Pjanić 45'; Ronaldo 78'; Can (yellow card) 90+1'	Report	Igor (yellow card) 55'; Petagna (yellow card) 82'	Stadium: Allianz Stadium; Attendance: 38,995; Referee: Marco Piccinini

5 October 2019 7	SPAL	1–0	Parma	Ferrara
15:00 CEST (UTC+02:00)	Strefezza (yellow card) 17' (yellow-red card) 70'; Petagna 31', (yellow card) 45+3'; Kurtić (yellow card) 89'; Sala (yellow card) 90'	Report	Hernani (yellow card) 45+3'; Gagliolo (yellow card) 82'	Stadium: Stadio Paolo Mazza; Attendance: 11,776; Referee: Marco Guida

20 October 2019 8	Cagliari	2–0	SPAL	Cagliari
15:00 CEST (UTC+02:00)	Nainggolan 9', (yellow card) 69'; Simeone (yellow card) 57'; Faragò 67'; Pellegrini (yellow card) 83'; Rog (yellow card) 89'	Report	Missiroli (yellow card) 47'; Tomović (yellow card) 54'; Igor (yellow card) 60'; Cionek (yellow card) 90'; Valoti (yellow card) 90+3'	Stadium: Sardegna Arena; Attendance: 15,713; Referee: Daniele Chiffi

27 October 2019 9	SPAL	1–1	Napoli	Ferrara
15:00 CET (UTC+01:00)	Kurtić 16'; Espeto (yellow card) 25'; Tomović (yellow card) 45'; Cionek (yellow card) 90+2'; Berisha (yellow card) 90+6'	Report	Milik 9'; Luperto (yellow card) 84'	Stadium: Stadio Paolo Mazza; Attendance: 14,726; Referee: Federico La Penna

31 October 2019 10	Milan	1–0	SPAL	Milan
21:00 CET (UTC+01:00)	Duarte (yellow card) 40'; G. Donnarumma (yellow card) 41'; Çalhanoğlu (yellow card) 57'; Suso 63'; Bennacer (yellow card) 69'	Report	Floccari (yellow card) 21'; Vicari (yellow card) 62'; Cionek (yellow card) 68'; Kurtić (yellow card) 73'	Stadium: San Siro; Attendance: 46,475; Referee: Marco Piccinini

4 November 2019 11	SPAL	0–1	Sampdoria	Ferrara
20:45 CET (UTC+01:00)	Igor (yellow card) 43'; Missiroli (yellow card) 87'; Kurtić (yellow card) 90+5'	Report	Depaoli (yellow card) 29'; Caprari 90+1'	Stadium: Stadio Paolo Mazza; Attendance: 11,617; Referee: Daniele Chiffi

10 November 2019 12	Udinese	0–0	SPAL	Udine
15:00 CET (UTC+01:00)	Nestorovski (yellow card) 26'; Becão (yellow card) 47'; Okaka (yellow card) 53'	Report	Reca (yellow card) 44'; Floccari (yellow card) 46'; Felipe (yellow card) 70'; Tomović (yellow card) 80'; Cionek (yellow card) 83'	Stadium: Dacia Arena; Attendance: 21,621; Referee: Davide Massa

25 November 2019 13	SPAL	1–1	Genoa	Ferrara
20:45 CET (UTC+01:00)	Petagna (yellow card) 28', (goal) 55' (pen.); Missiroli (yellow card) 41'	Report	Sturaro 57'; Ghiglione (yellow card) 61'	Stadium: Stadio Paolo Mazza; Attendance: 12,423; Referee: Piero Giacomelli

1 December 2019 14	Internazionale	2–1	SPAL	Milan
15:00 CET (UTC+01:00)	Martínez 16', 41'; D'Ambrosio (yellow card) 59'	Report	Valoti 50'; Valdifiori (yellow card) 57'; Igor (yellow card) 77'; Cionek (yellow card) 80'; Murgia (yellow card) 90+4'	Stadium: San Siro; Attendance: 61,221; Referee: Massimiliano Irrati

8 December 2019 15	SPAL	0–1	Brescia	Ferrara
15:00 CET (UTC+01:00)	Vicari (yellow card) 21'; Kurtić (yellow card) 42'; Cionek (yellow card) 45+2'	Report	Cistana (yellow card) 18'; Balotelli 54'; Magnani (yellow card) 72'; Joronen (yellow card) 90+5'	Stadium: Stadio Paolo Mazza; Attendance: 12,442; Referee: Daniele Orsato

15 December 2019 16	Roma	3–1	SPAL	Rome
18:00 CET (UTC+01:00)	Pellegrini 53'; Çetin (yellow card) 54'; Perotti 66' (pen.); Mkhitaryan 83'	Report	Petagna 44' (pen.); Felipe (yellow card) 50'; Vicari (yellow card) 66'; Janković (yellow card) 90+3'	Stadium: Stadio Olimpico; Attendance: 34,761; Referee: Antonio Giua

21 December 2019 17	Torino	1–2	SPAL	Turin
20:45 CET (UTC+01:00)	Rincón 4'; Ansaldi (yellow card) 24'; Bremer (yellow card) 41' (yellow-red card) 56'; Sirigu (yellow card) 44'	Report	Espeto 42'; Valoti (yellow card) 63'; Igor (yellow card) 68'; Missiroli (yellow card) 71'; Petagna 81', (yellow card) 82'	Stadium: Stadio Olimpico Grande Torino; Attendance: 18,553; Referee: Michael Fabbri

5 January 2020 18	SPAL	0–2	Hellas Verona	Ferrara
15:00 CET (UTC+01:00)	Tomović (red card) 39'; Espeto (yellow card) 45+1'	Report	Pazzini 14'; Zaccagni (yellow card) 66'; Stępiński 86'	Stadium: Stadio Paolo Mazza; Attendance: 18,553; Referee: Marco Guida

12 January 2020 19	Fiorentina	1–0	SPAL	Florence
15:00 CET (UTC+01:00)	Pezzella (yellow card) 38', (goal) 82'	Report	Murgia (yellow card) 79'	Stadium: Stadio Artemio Franchi; Attendance: 33,970; Referee: Daniele Doveri

20 January 2020 20	Atalanta	1–2	SPAL	Bergamo
20:45 CET (UTC+01:00)	Iličić 16'; De Roon (yellow card) 40'; Palomino (yellow card) 50'	Report	Valoti (yellow card) 5', (goal) 60'; Vicari (yellow card) 21'; Di Francesco (yellow card) 45'; Petagna 54'	Stadium: Gewiss Stadium; Attendance: 18,313; Referee: Federico La Penna

25 January 2020 21	SPAL	1–3	Bologna	Ferrara
15:00 CET (UTC+01:00)	Cionek (yellow card) 11'; Valoti (yellow card) 14'; Petagna 23' (pen.), (yellow card) 35'; Berisha (yellow card) 28'	Report	Paz (yellow card) 22'; Vicari 24' (o.g.); Barrow 59'; Poli 63'; Orsolini (yellow card) 68'; Tomiyasu (yellow card) 89'	Stadium: Stadio Paolo Mazza; Attendance: 12,622; Referee: Michael Fabbri

2 February 2020 22	Lazio	5–1	SPAL	Rome
15:00 CET (UTC+01:00)	Immobile 3', 29'; Caicedo 16', 38'; Milinković-Savić (yellow card) 44'; Adekanye 58'	Report	Di Francesco (yellow card) 61'; Missiroli 65', (yellow card) 80'	Stadium: Stadio Olimpico; Attendance: 40,000; Referee: Antonio Giua

9 February 2020 23	SPAL	1–2	Sassuolo	Ferrara
12:30 CET (UTC+01:00)	Bonifazi 23'; Dabo (yellow card) 38'; Espeto (yellow card) 89'	Report	Obiang (yellow card) 47'; Locatelli (yellow card) 56'; Caputo 65' (pen.); Kyriakopoulos (yellow card) 86'; Boga 90'; Consigli (yellow card) 90+2'	Stadium: Stadio Paolo Mazza; Attendance: 12,988; Referee: Piero Giacomelli

15 February 2020 24	Lecce	2–1	SPAL	Lecce
15:00 CET (UTC+01:00)	Majer (yellow card) 16', (goal) 66'; Mancosu 41' (pen.); Deiola (yellow card) 43'; Calderoni (yellow card) 45'; Lapadula (yellow card) 60'; Shakhov (yellow card) 90+4'	Report	Di Francesco (yellow card) 20'; Bonifazi (yellow card) 40'; Petagna 47'; Valdifiori (yellow card) 61'	Stadium: Stadio Via del Mare; Attendance: 24,129; Referee: Marco Guida

22 February 2020 25	SPAL	1–2	Juventus	Ferrara
18:00 CET (UTC+01:00)	Valoti (yellow card) 19'; Zukanović (yellow card) 45+1'; Petagna 69' (pen.); Espeto (yellow card) 88'; Cionek (yellow card) 90+1'	Report	Ronaldo 39'; Ramsey 60'; Matuidi (yellow card) 78'; Danilo (yellow card) 90'	Stadium: Stadio Paolo Mazza; Attendance: 15,262; Referee: Federico La Penna

8 March 2020 26	Parma	0–1	SPAL	Parma
13:45 CET (UTC+01:00)	Brugman (yellow card) 62'; Gagliolo (yellow card) 90+5'	Report	Felipe (yellow card) 39'; Petagna 71' (pen.)	Stadium: Stadio Ennio Tardini; Attendance: 0 Referee: Luca Pairetto
Note: Match was initially postponed to 13 May from its original date of 1 March due to concerns over the COVID-19 pandemic, but was later moved to 8 March to be played behind closed doors.

23 June 2020 27	SPAL	0–1	Cagliari	Ferrara
19:30 CEST (UTC+02:00)	Espeto (yellow card) 11'; Bonifazi (yellow card) 45'; Valdifiori (yellow card) 76'	Report	Ioniță (yellow card) 13'; Nández (yellow card) 37'; Rog (yellow card) 40'; Simeone 90+3'	Stadium: Stadio Paolo Mazza; Attendance: 0 Referee: Rosario Abisso
Note: Match was postponed to 14 March, then to 23 June, from its original date of 7 March due to schedule shuffling to allow for Parma vs SPAL to be played following its previous postponement due to concerns over the COVID-19 pandemic. All subsequent matches were also shuffled to allow for this accommodation. However, on 9 March, all sports events in Italy were suspended until 3 April. This was the first match played since the COVID-19 pandemic lockdown in Italy.

28 June 2020 28	Napoli	3–1	SPAL	Naples
19:30 CEST (UTC+02:00)	Mertens 4'; Callejón 36'; Younes 78'	Report	Petagna 29'; Valoti (yellow card) 73'; Farès (yellow card) 79'; Felipe (yellow card) 89'	Stadium: Stadio San Paolo; Attendance: 0 Referee: Luca Pairetto

1 July 2020 29	SPAL	2–2	Milan	Ferrara
21:45 CEST (UTC+02:00)	Valoti 13'; Floccari 30'; D'Alessandro (red card) 43'; Valdifiori (yellow card) 45'; Letica (yellow card) 58'; Dabo (yellow card) 83'	Report	Leão 79'; Vicari 90+3' (o.g.)	Stadium: Stadio Paolo Mazza; Attendance: 0 Referee: Maurizio Mariani

5 July 2020 30	Sampdoria	3–0	SPAL	Genoa
19:30 CEST (UTC+02:00)	Bertolacci (yellow card) 3'; Linetty 12', 45+3'; Gabbiadini 45'	Report	Cionek (yellow card) 37'	Stadium: Stadio Luigi Ferraris; Attendance: 0 Referee: Piero Giacomelli

9 July 2020 31	SPAL	0–3	Udinese	Ferrara
19:30 CEST (UTC+02:00)		Report	De Paul 18'; Okaka 35'; Lasagna 82'	Stadium: Stadio Paolo Mazza; Attendance: 0 Referee: Daniele Chiffi

12 July 2020 32	Genoa	2–0	SPAL	Genoa
17:15 CEST (UTC+02:00)	Pandev 24'; Schöne 54'; Behrami (yellow card) 67'	Report	Floccari (yellow card) 64'; Cerri (yellow card) 76'	Stadium: Stadio Luigi Ferraris; Attendance: 0 Referee: Marco Guida

16 July 2020 33	SPAL	0–4	Internazionale	Ferrara
21:45 CEST (UTC+02:00)	Valdifiori (yellow card) 46'; Murgia (yellow card) 51'	Report	Bastoni (yellow card) 32'; Candreva 37'; Biraghi (yellow card) 54', (goal) 55'; Sánchez 60'; Ranocchia (yellow card) 62'; Gagliardini 74'	Stadium: Stadio Paolo Mazza; Attendance: 0 Referee: Antonio Giua

19 July 2020 34	Brescia	2–1	SPAL	Brescia
19:30 CEST (UTC+02:00)	Špalek (yellow card) 14'; Zmrhal 69', 90+3'; Torregrossa (yellow card) 89'	Report	Dabo 42', (yellow card) 76'; Reca (yellow card) 58'	Stadium: Stadio Mario Rigamonti; Attendance: 0 Referee: Eugenio Abbattista

22 July 2020 35	SPAL	1–6	Roma	Ferrara
21:45 CEST (UTC+02:00)	Cerri 24'; Espeto (yellow card) 77'; Bonifazi (red card) 85'	Report	Kalinić 10'; Pérez 38'; Kolarov 47'; Peres 52', 75'; Zaniolo 90'	Stadium: Stadio Paolo Mazza; Attendance: 0 Referee: Gianluca Manganiello

26 July 2020 36	SPAL	1–1	Torino	Ferrara
19:30 CEST (UTC+02:00)	Cionek (yellow card) 18'; Salamon (yellow card) 39'; D'Alessandro 80'	Report	Ansaldi (yellow card) 38'; Belotti (yellow card) 42'; Rincón (yellow card) 45'; Verdi 57'	Stadium: Stadio Paolo Mazza; Attendance: 0 Referee: Rosario Abisso

29 July 2020 37	Hellas Verona	3–0	SPAL	Verona
19:30 CEST (UTC+02:00)	Di Carmine 7', 11'; Faraoni 47'; Eysseric (yellow card) 53'	Report	Dabo (yellow card) 66'	Stadium: Stadio Marc'Antonio Bentegodi; Attendance: 0 Referee: Simone Sozza

2 August 2020 38	SPAL	1–3	Fiorentina	Ferrara
18:00 CEST (UTC+02:00)	D'Alessandro 39'; Farès (yellow card) 45+2'	Report	Duncan 30'; Kouamé 89'; Chiesa (yellow card) 90+2'; Pulgar 90+3' (pen.)	Stadium: Stadio Paolo Mazza; Attendance: 0 Referee: Alessandro Prontera

=== Coppa Italia ===
18 August 2019 Third round	SPAL	3–1	FeralpiSalò	Ferrara
20:45 CEST (UTC+02:00)	Di Francesco 3'; Valoti 16', 32'; Missiroli (yellow card) 47'; Janković (yellow card) 84'		Maiorino 1'; Legati (red card) 90+1'	Stadium: Stadio Paolo Mazza; Attendance: 5,374; Referee: Daniele Chiffi

4 December 2019 Fourth round	SPAL	5–1	Lecce	Ferrara
18:00 CET (UTC+01:00)	Missiroli (yellow card) 8'; Igor 18'; Paloschi 24'; Murgia (yellow card) 28', (goal) 31'; Cionek 45'; Floccari 83'	Report	Imbula (yellow card) 49', (goal) 55'	Stadium: Stadio Paolo Mazza; Attendance: 4,947; Referee: Antonio Giua

15 January 2020 Round of 16	Milan	3–0	SPAL	Milan
18:00 CET (UTC+01:00)	Piątek 20'; Conti (yellow card) 33'; Castillejo (yellow card) 41', (goal) 44'; Hernandez 66'	Report	Murgia (yellow card) 61'; Igor (yellow card) 72'; Salamon (yellow card) 84'	Stadium: San Siro; Attendance: 32,093; Referee: Davide Ghersini

== Statistics ==
=== Appearances and goals ===
No.	Pos	Nat	Player	Total		Serie A		Coppa Italia	
No.	Pos	Nat	Player	Apps	Goals	Apps	Goals	Apps	Goals
Goalkeepers
22	GK	(Senegal) SEN	Demba Thiam	2	0	2	0	0	0
25	GK	(Croatia) CRO	Karlo Letica	10	0	10	0	0	0
99	GK	(Albania) ALB	Etrit Berisha	29	0	26	0	3	0
Defenders
4	DF	(Poland) POL	Thiago Cionek	30	1	23+5	0	2	1
13	DF	(Poland) POL	Arkadiusz Reca	26	0	22+3	0	1	0
23	DF	(Italy) ITA	Francesco Vicari	37	0	33+1	0	3	0
26	DF	(Italy) ITA	Jacopo Sala	16	0	9+7	0	0	0
27	DF	(Brazil) BRA	Felipe	16	0	11+4	0	1	0
40	DF	(Serbia) SRB	Nenad Tomović	25	0	20+3	0	2	0
41	DF	(Italy) ITA	Kevin Bonifazi	14	1	13+1	1	0	0
66	DF	(Poland) POL	Bartosz Salamon	8	0	3+4	0	0+1	0
87	DF	(Bosnia and Herzegovina) BIH	Ervin Zukanović	3	0	2+1	0	0	0
89	DF	(Poland) POL	Jakub Iskra	2	0	0+2	0	0	0
93	DF	(Algeria) ALG	Mohamed Fares	8	0	5+3	0	0	0
Midfielders
6	MF	(Italy) ITA	Mirko Valdifiori	22	0	15+7	0	0	0
7	MF	(Italy) ITA	Simone Missiroli	36	1	31+3	1	2	0
8	MF	(Italy) ITA	Mattia Valoti	30	5	18+9	3	1+2	2
11	MF	(Italy) ITA	Alessandro Murgia	28	1	19+6	0	2+1	1
14	MF	(Burkina Faso) BFA	Bryan Dabo	17	1	13+3	1	1	0
19	MF	(Argentina) ARG	Lucas Castro	7	0	6+1	0	0	0
21	MF	(Brazil) BRA	Espeto	33	1	24+8	1	1	0
77	MF	(Italy) ITA	Marco D'Alessandro	16	2	10+5	2	1	0
90	MF	(Hungary) HUN	Krisztofer Horváth	3	0	0+3	0	0	0
94	MF	(Kosovo) KOS	Altin Kryeziu	1	0	0	0	0+1	0
96	MF	(Estonia) EST	Georgi Tunjov	11	0	3+7	0	1	0
97	MF	(Italy) ITA	Federico Zanchetta	1	0	0	0	0+1	0
Forwards
10	FW	(Italy) ITA	Sergio Floccari	26	2	9+15	1	2	1
31	FW	(Italy) ITA	Federico Di Francesco	21	3	13+7	2	1	1
32	FW	(Italy) ITA	Alberto Cerri	8	1	5+3	1	0	0
37	FW	(Italy) ITA	Andrea Petagna	37	12	33+3	12	1	0
94	FW	(Bolivia) BOL	Jaume Cuéllar	2	0	1+1	0	0	0
Players transferred out during the season
3	DF	(Brazil) BRA	Igor	20	0	15+2	0	2+1	0
9	FW	(Italy) ITA	Gabriele Moncini	5	0	2+2	0	1	0
19	MF	(Slovenia) SVN	Jasmin Kurtić	18	2	16	2	1+1	0
43	FW	(Italy) ITA	Alberto Paloschi	12	1	5+5	0	2	1
95	FW	(Montenegro) MNE	Marko Janković	9	0	1+5	0	2+1	0

Last updated: 2 August 2020
Source: Competitions

=== Goalscorers ===
Rank	No.	Pos	Nat	Name	Serie A	Coppa Italia	Total
1	31	FW	(Italy)	Federico Di Francesco	2	1	3
1	37	FW	(Italy)	Andrea Petagna	3	0	3
3	8	MF	(Italy)	Mattia Valoti	0	2	2
4	19	MF	(Slovenia)	Jasmin Kurtić	1	0	1
Own goal					0	0	0
Totals					6	3	9

Last updated: 5 October 2019

=== Clean sheets ===
Rank	No.	Pos	Nat	Name	Serie A	Coppa Italia	Total
1	99	GK	(Albania)	Etrit Berisha	1	0	1
Totals					1	0	1

Last updated: 5 October 2019

=== Disciplinary record ===
No.	Pos	Nat	Name	Serie A			Coppa Italia			Total		
No.	Pos	Nat	Name	Booked	(yellow card) (yellow-red card)	Sent off (straight red)	Booked	(yellow card) (yellow-red card)	Sent off (straight red)	Booked	(yellow card) (yellow-red card)	Sent off (straight red)
3	DF	(Brazil)	Igor	3	0	0	0	0	0	3	0	0
4	DF	(Poland)	Thiago Cionek	1	0	0	0	0	0	1	0	0
26	DF	(Italy)	Jacopo Sala	1	0	0	0	0	0	1	0	0
27	DF	(Brazil)	Felipe	1	0	0	0	0	0	1	0	0
40	DF	(Serbia)	Nenad Tomović	2	0	0	0	0	0	2	0	0
7	MF	(Italy)	Simone Missiroli	2	0	0	1	0	0	3	0	0
8	MF	(Italy)	Mattia Valoti	1	0	0	0	0	0	1	0	0
19	MF	(Slovenia)	Jasmin Kurtić	2	0	0	0	0	0	2	0	0
21	MF	(Brazil)	Espeto	1	1	0	0	0	0	1	1	0
31	FW	(Italy)	Federico Di Francesco	1	0	0	0	0	0	1	0	0
37	FW	(Italy)	Andrea Petagna	2	0	0	0	0	0	2	0	0
95	FW	(Montenegro)	Marko Janković	0	0	0	1	0	0	1	0	0
Totals				17	1	0	2	0	0	19	1	0

Last updated: 5 October 2019
