= 2022–23 SPAL season =

SPAL
2022–23 season
- Chairman: Joe Tacopina
- Head coach: Roberto Venturato (until 9 October); Daniele De Rossi (from 11 October until 14 February); Massimo Oddo (from 14 February)
- Stadium: Stadio Paolo Mazza
- Serie B: 19th (relegated)
- Coppa Italia: Round of 32
Home colours	Away colours	Third colours

The 2022–23 season was the 116th in the history of S.P.A.L. and their third consecutive season in the second division. The club participated in Serie B and the Coppa Italia.

== Players ==
As of 30 January 2023

Note: Flags indicate national team as defined under FIFA eligibility rules; some limited exceptions apply. Players may hold more than one non-FIFA nationality.

No.	Pos.	Nation	Player
1	GK	ITA	Enrico Alfonso
2	DF	ITA	Alessandro Fiordaliso
3	DF	ITA	Alessandro Tripaldelli
4	DF	ITA	Christian Dalle Mura (on loan from Fiorentina)
6	DF	ITA	Biagio Meccariello
9	FW	ITA	Gabriele Moncini (on loan from Benevento)
10	MF	ITA	Niccolò Zanellato
11	MF	GRE	Giannis Fetfatzidis
12	GK	ITA	Lorenzo Abati
13	DF	ITA	Marco Varnier (on loan from Atalanta)
14	MF	ARG	Franco Zuculini
15	DF	ITA	Filippo Saiani
16	MF	ITA	Luca Valzania (on loan from Cremonese)
17	GK	ITA	Alberto Pomini
18	DF	ITA	Matteo Arena
19	FW	ITA	Andrea La Mantia (on loan from Empoli)

No.	Pos.	Nation	Player
20	MF	ITA	Matteo Prati
21	DF	ITA	Raffaele Celia
22	GK	SEN	Demba Thiam
23	MF	ITA	Alessandro Murgia
24	DF	ITA	Lorenzo Dickmann (captain)
27	DF	POL	Patryk Peda
28	MF	ITA	Filippo Puletto
29	DF	ITA	Alberto Almici
32	FW	ITA	Nicola Rauti (on loan from Torino)
34	MF	MAR	Ayoub Abou
37	MF	ITA	Fabio Maistro
40	MF	EST	Georgi Tunjov
44	MF	BEL	Radja Nainggolan
70	MF	ITA	Alessandro Boccia
99	FW	ITA	Simone Rabbi

=== Out on loan ===
As of 30 January 2023

Note: Flags indicate national team as defined under FIFA eligibility rules; some limited exceptions apply. Players may hold more than one non-FIFA nationality.

No.	Pos.	Nation	Player
—	GK	ITA	Cesare Galeotti (at Rimini)
—	GK	ITA	Andrea Magri (at Union Clodiense)
—	GK	ITA	Marco Meneghetti (at Gubbio)
—	DF	ITA	Niccolò Bellucci (at Alessandria)
—	DF	ITA	Matteo Borsoi (at Vis Pesaro)
—	DF	MDA	Daniel Dumbravanu (at APOEL)
—	DF	ITA	Riccardo Mari (at Mezzolara)
—	DF	TOG	Steven Nador (at Montevarchi)
—	DF	ITA	Moustapha Yabre (at Recanatese)

No.	Pos.	Nation	Player
—	MF	ITA	Christian Basile (at Cavese)
—	MF	ITA	Salvatore Esposito (at Spezia, obligation to buy)
—	MF	ROU	Luca Mihai (at Trento)
—	MF	ITA	Alessandro Orfei (at Fidelis Andria)
—	MF	ITA	Federico Zanchetta (at Olbia)
—	FW	ITA	Jionathan Campagna (at Torres)
—	FW	ITA	Ludovico D'Orazio (at Mantova)
—	FW	MEX	Teun Wilke (at Cercle Brugge)

== Pre-season and friendlies ==
Win Draw Loss

20 July 2022 Friendly	SPAL (Italy)	3–1	(Italy) Virtus Verona	Mezzana
17:30 CEST (UTC+2)	Zanellato 48'; La Mantia 51'; Rabbi 64'	Report	Vesentini 89'	Stadium: Centro Sportivo Comunale di Mezzana

24 July 2022 Friendly	Cremonese (Italy)	2–0	(Italy) SPAL	Dimaro
16:30 CEST (UTC+2)	Valeri 48'; Báez 90' (pen.)	Report		Stadium: Centro Sportivo di Dimaro; Referee: Daniele Minelli

30 July 2022 Friendly	SPAL (Italy)	1–0	(Italy) Pontedera	Ferrara
17:30 CEST (UTC+2)	Viviani 45'	Report		Stadium: Centro Sportivo “GB Fabbri” SPAL; Referee: Daniele Chiffi

== Competitions ==
=== Overall record ===
Competition	First match	Last match	Starting round	Final position	Record							
Competition	First match	Last match	Starting round	Final position	Pld	W	D	L	GF	GA	GD	Win %
Serie B	14 August 2022	19 May 2023	Matchday 1	19th	38	8	14	16	41	51	−10	21.05
Coppa Italia	6 August 2022	18 October 2022	Round of 64	Round of 32	2	1	0	1	2	2	+0	50.00
Total					40	9	14	17	43	53	−10	22.50

Source: Soccerway

=== Serie B ===
==== League table ====
Pos	Team	Pld	W	D	L	GF	GA	GD	Pts	Promotion, qualification or relegation
16	Brescia	38	9	13	16	36	57	−21	40	Spared from relegation
17	Cosenza (O)	38	9	13	16	30	53	−23	40	Qualification for relegation play-out
18	Perugia (R)	38	10	9	19	40	52	−12	39	Relegation to Serie C
19	SPAL (R)	38	8	14	16	41	51	−10	38	Relegation to Serie C
20	Benevento (R)	38	7	14	17	33	49	−16	35	Relegation to Serie C

Source: Soccerway (in English)
Rules for classification: 1) Points; 2) Head-to-head points; 3) Head-to-head goal difference; 4) Goal difference; 5) Goals scored; 6) Draw.
(O) Play-off winners; (R) Relegated

==== Results summary ====
Overall								Home						Away					
Pld	W	D	L	GF	GA	GD	Pts	W	D	L	GF	GA	GD	W	D	L	GF	GA	GD
38	8	14	16	41	51	−10	38	4	7	8	25	27	−2	4	7	8	16	24	−8

Source: Serie B

==== Results by round ====
Round	1	2	3	4	5	6	7	8	9	10	11	12	13	14	15	16	17	18	19	20	21	22	23	24	25	26	27	28	29	30	31	32	33	34	35	36	37	38
Ground	H	A	H	A	H	A	H	A	A	H	H	A	H	A	H	A	H	A	H	A	H	A	H	A	H	A	H	H	A	A	H	A	H	A	H	A	H	A
Result	L	D	W	D	W	D	L	L	D	W	D	D	L	L	L	D	D	W	L	W	D	L	L	L	D	L	L	W	L	L	D	W	D	D	D	L	L	W
Position	18	17	14	12	7	9	11	14	13	11	11	11	12	14	16	17	17	15	16	14	14	15	17	18	18	18	20	17	19	19	18	18	18	19	19	19	19	19

Source: Serie B
A = Away; H = Home; W = Win; D = Draw; L = Loss

==== Matches ====
The league fixtures were announced on 15 July 2022.

14 August 2022 1	SPAL	1–3	Reggina	Ferrara
20:45 CEST (UTC+2)				Stadium: Stadio Paolo Mazza

20 August 2022 2	Ascoli	2–2	SPAL	Ascoli Piceno
				Stadium: Stadio Cino e Lillo Del Duca

27 August 2022 3	SPAL	1–0	Cagliari	Ferrara
				Stadium: Stadio Paolo Mazza

3 September 2022 4	Bari	2–2	SPAL	Bari
				Stadium: Stadio San Nicola

11 September 2022 5	SPAL	2–0	Venezia	Ferrara
				Stadium: Stadio Paolo Mazza

17 September 2022 6	Como	3–3	SPAL	Como

1 October 2022 7	SPAL	0–2	Genoa	Ferrara
				Stadium: Stadio Paolo Mazza

8 October 2022 8	Frosinone	2–0	SPAL	Frosinone

15 October 2022 9	Cittadella	0–0	Südtirol	Cittadella

22 October 2022 10	SPAL	5–0	Cosenza	Ferrara
				Stadium: Stadio Paolo Mazza

29 October 2022 11	SPAL	1–1	Südtirol	Ferrara
				Stadium: Stadio Paolo Mazza

5 November 2022 12	Ternana	0–0	SPAL	Terni

12 November 2022 13	SPAL	1–2	Benevento	Ferrara
				Stadium: Stadio Paolo Mazza

27 November 2022 14	Brescia	2–0	SPAL	Brescia

4 December 2022 15	SPAL	2–3	Modena	Ferrara
				Stadium: Stadio Paolo Mazza

8 December 2022 16	Perugia	0–0	SPAL	Perugia

11 December 2022 17	SPAL	1–1	Palermo	Ferrara
				Stadium: Stadio Paolo Mazza

18 December 2022 18	Parma	0–1	SPAL	Parma

26 December 2022 19	SPAL	0–1	Pisa	Ferrara
				Stadium: Stadio Paolo Mazza

14 January 2023 20	Reggina	0–1	SPAL	Reggio Calabria
				Stadium: Stadio Oreste Granillo

21 January 2023 21	SPAL	1–1	Ascoli	Ferrara
				Stadium: Stadio Paolo Mazza

27 January 2023 22	Cagliari	2–1	SPAL	Cagliari
				Stadium: Unipol Domus

4 February 2023 23	SPAL	3–4	Bari	Ferrara
				Stadium: Stadio Paolo Mazza

11 February 2023 24	Venenzia	2–1	SPAL	Venice
				Stadium: Stadio Pier Luigi Penzo

18 February 2023 25	SPAL	1–1	Como	Ferrara
				Stadium: Stadio Paolo Mazza

25 February 2023 26	Genoa	3–0	SPAL	Genoa
	Drăgușin 77'; Guðmundsson 90+3'; Salceddo 90+7'			Stadium: Stadio Luigi Ferraris

1 March 2023 27	SPAL	0–2	Frosinone	Ferrara
			Lucioni 24'; Caso 61'	Stadium: Stadio Paolo Mazza

5 March 2023 28	SPAL	2–1	Cittadella	Ferrara
				Stadium: Stadio Paolo Mazza

12 March 2023 29	Cosenza	1–0	SPAL	Cosenza
				Stadium: Stadio San Vito-Gigi Marulla

18 March 2023 30	Südtirol	2–0	SPAL	Bolzano
				Stadium: Stadio Druso

1 April 2023 31	SPAL	1–1	Ternana	Ferrara
				Stadium: Stadio Paolo Mazza

10 April 2023 32	Benevento	1–3	SPAL	Benevento
				Stadium: Stadio Ciro Vigorito

15 April 2023 33	SPAL	2–2	Brescia	Ferrara
				Stadium: Stadio Paolo Mazza

22 April 2023 34	Modena	0–0	SPAL	Modena
				Stadium: Stadio Alberto Braglia

30 April 2023 35	SPAL	1–1	Perugia	Ferrara
				Stadium: Stadio Paolo Mazza

6 May 2023 36	Palermo	2–1	SPAL	Palermo
				Stadium: Stadio Renzo Barbera

13 May 2023 37	SPAL	0–1	Parma	Ferrara
				Stadium: Stadio Paolo Mazza

19 May 2023 38	Pisa	1–2	SPAL	Pisa
				Stadium: Arena Garibaldi

=== Coppa Italia ===
6 August 2022 Round of 64	Empoli	1–2 (a.e.t.)	SPAL	Empoli
21:00 CEST (UTC+2)	Cambiaghi 80'	Report	Dickmann 82'; Arena 120+1'	Stadium: Stadio Carlo Castellani; Referee: Manuel Volpi

18 October 2022 Round of 32	Genoa	1–0	SPAL	Genoa
18:00 CEST (UTC+2)	Guðmundsson 45+1' (pen.)	Report		Stadium: Stadio Luigi Ferraris; Referee: Alberto Santoro
