= Patryk Peda =

Polish footballer

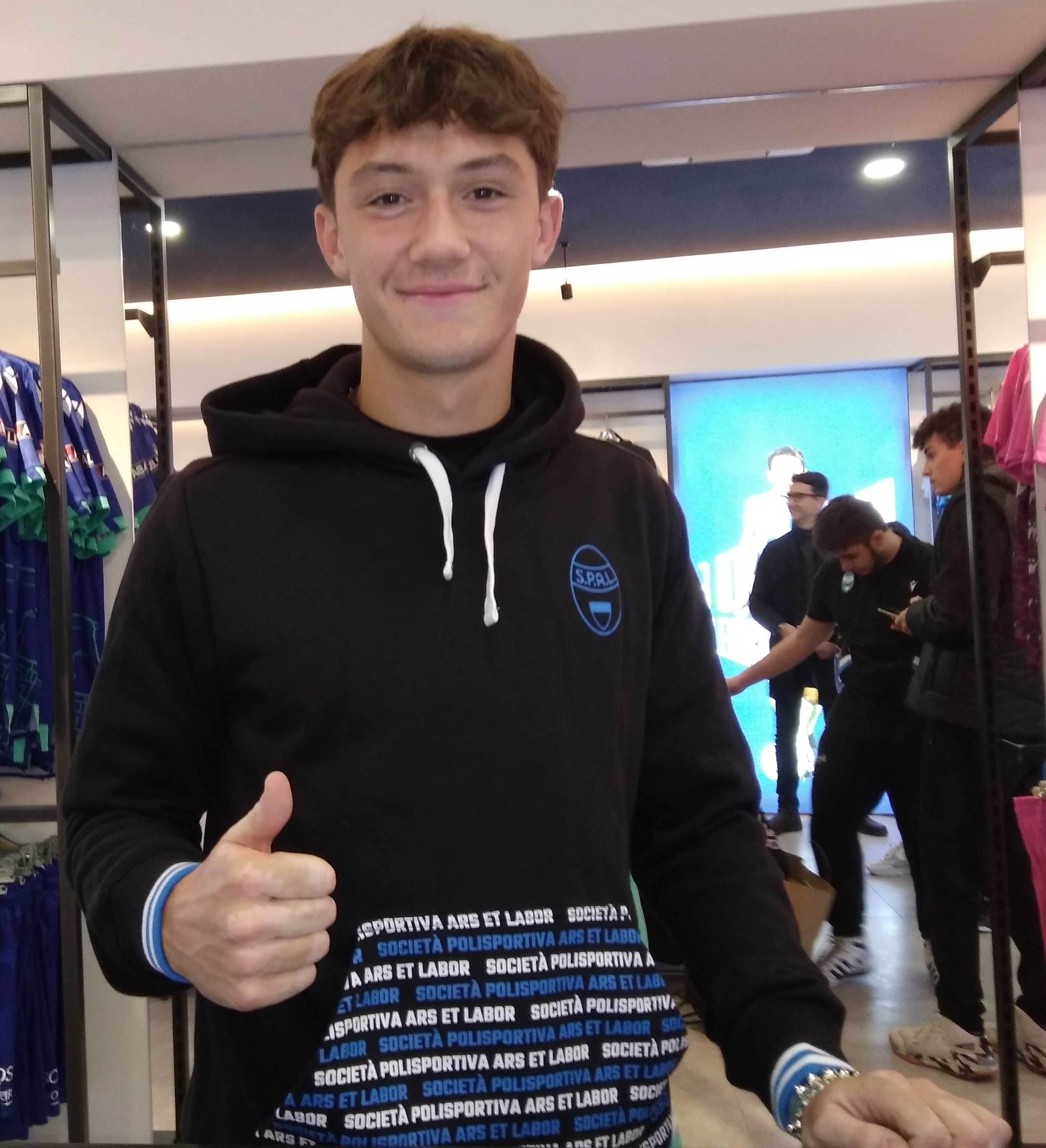
- Peda in 2022 with SPAL

Personal information
- Date of birth: 16 April 2002 (age 24)
- Place of birth: Zalesie Górne, Poland
- Height: 1.90 m (6 ft 3 in)
- Position: Centre-back

Team information
- Current team: Palermo
- Number: 29

Youth career
- Kosa Konstancin
- –2019: Legia Warsaw
- 2019: → SPAL (loan)
- 2019–2021: SPAL

Senior career*
Years	Team	Apps	(Gls)
2021–2023	SPAL	34	(1)
2023–	Palermo	34	(0)
2023–2024	→ SPAL (loan)	23	(3)
2025	→ Juve Stabia (loan)	13	(0)

International career
2017–2018	Poland U16	5	(0)
2018–2019	Poland U17	2	(0)
2020	Poland U19	2	(0)
2021–2022	Poland U20	4	(0)
2022–2025	Poland U21	21	(0)
2023	Poland	3	(0)
- * Club domestic league appearances and goals as of 13:04, 9 May 2026 (UTC)

Patryk Peda (born 16 April 2002) is a Polish professional footballer who plays as a centre-back for Serie B club Palermo.

== Club career ==
Peda came through the youth ranks of Legia Warsaw, before joining the then Serie A club of SPAL in January 2019, on loan with an obligation to buy. He eventually joined the club on a permanent basis the following summer.

After a season where he took the spotlight in Primavera, playing 29 games and scoring one goal, Peda made his professional debut for SPAL on 18 September 2021, replacing Riccardo Spaltro during a 2–1 away Serie B defeat against Reggina. A few days after his first game, he extended his contract until June 2024.

On 1 September 2023, Palermo completed the signing of Peda on a contract until 30 June 2028, and sent him back on loan to SPAL for the 2023–24 Serie C season.

On 25 January 2025, Peda joined fellow Serie B outfit Juve Stabia on loan for the rest of the season.

== International career ==
Peda was a youth international with Poland. Having progressed through all the junior teams, he received his first call-up to the Poland national under-20 team in 2021. He received his first U21 call-up in November 2021.

On 5 October 2023, Peda received his first senior team call-up for the UEFA Euro 2024 qualifying matches against Faroe Islands and Moldova, to be played on 12 and 15 October. He played the full 90 minutes in his debut, a 2–0 away victory against the former opponent.

== Career statistics ==
=== Club ===
As of match played 20 May 2026

Appearances and goals by club, season and competition
Club	Season	League			Coppa Italia		Europe		Other		Total	
Club	Season	Division	Apps	Goals	Apps	Goals	Apps	Goals	Apps	Goals	Apps	Goals
SPAL	2020–21	Serie B	0	0	0	0	—		—		0	0
SPAL	2021–22	Serie B	13	0	0	0	—		—		13	0
SPAL	2022–23	Serie B	21	1	1	0	—		—		22	1
SPAL (loan)	2023–24	Serie C Group B	23	3	—		—		2 (Note: Appearances in Coppa Italia Serie C)	0	23	3
SPAL (loan)	Total		57	4	1	0	—		2	0	60	4
Palermo	2024–25	Serie B	1	0	2	0	—		—		3	0
Palermo	2025–26	Serie B	33	0	2	1	—		2 (Note: Appearances in Serie B promotion play-offs)	0	37	1
Palermo	Total		34	0	4	1	—		2	0	40	1
Juve Stabia (loan)	2024–25	Serie B	10	0	—		—		3	0	13	0
Career total			101	4	5	1	0	0	7	0	113	5

=== International ===
As of match played 17 November 2023

Appearances and goals by national team and year
National team	Year	Apps	Goals
Poland
Poland	2023	3	0
Total		3	0
