= Demba Thiam (footballer, born 1998) =

Senegalese footballer

Personal information
- Full name: Demba Thiam Ngagne
- Date of birth: 9 March 1998 (age 28)
- Place of birth: Dakar, Senegal
- Height: 2.02 m (6 ft 8 in)
- Position: Goalkeeper

Team information
- Current team: Monza
- Number: 20

Youth career
- 2016–2017: SPAL

Senior career*
| Years | Team | Apps | (Gls) |
| 2017–2025 | SPAL | 36 | (0) |
| 2017–2018 | → Fano (loan) | 18 | (0) |
| 2019 | → Viterbese Castrense (loan) | 2 | (0) |
| 2023 | → Foggia (loan) | 12 | (0) |
| 2023–2025 | → Juve Stabia (loan) | 74 | (0) |
| 2025– | Monza | 38 | (0) |
- * Club domestic league appearances and goals as of 12 May 2026

Demba Thiam Ngagne (born 9 March 1998) is a Senegalese professional footballer who plays as a goalkeeper for Serie A club Monza.

== Club career ==
=== SPAL ===
Thiam started playing for the Under-19 squad of SPAL in the 2016–17 season and made two bench appearances for the senior squad in the Serie B.

==== Loan to Fano ====
On 17 July 2017, he was loaned to Serie C club Fano. Thiam made his Serie C debut for Fano on 16 December 2017 in a game against Fermana as a starter. He remained Fano's first-choice goalkeeper for the remainder of the season.

==== Return to SPAL and loan to Viterbese Castrense ====
Thiam was the third goalkeeper for the first part of the 2018–19 Serie A season, but did not see any playing time behind Alfred Gomis and Vanja Milinković-Savić. On 9 January 2019, he returned to Serie C on another loan, to Viterbese Castrense.

He came back to SPAL at the end of loan, and he made his Serie A debut in a 1–1 home draw against Torino on 26 July 2020.

In September 2022, Thiam renewed his contract with the club until 2025.

==== Loan to Foggia ====
On 31 January 2023, he joined Foggia on loan until the end of the season.

==== Loan to Juve Stabia ====
On 20 July 2023, Thiam moved on loan to Juve Stabia. After winning promotion to Serie B with the Campanians, his loan was renewed for the 2024–25 season, this time with an option to buy.

=== Monza ===
On 8 July 2025, he signed with Serie B club Monza.

== International career ==
Thiam was one of the players who were called up with the Senegal national team by head coach Patrick Vieira for the 2027 Africa Cup of Nations qualification matches against Mozambique and Ethiopia on 25 and 29 September 2026, respectively; and the friendly match against Comoros on 4 October 2026.

== Personal life ==
Thiam also has Italian citizenship through marriage to a Neapolitan woman, with whom he has a daughter.

== Career statistics ==
=== Club ===
As of match played 13 September 2026

Appearances and goals by club, season and competition
| Club | Season | League | | | Coppa Italia | | Other | | Total | |
| Club | Season | Division | Apps | Goals | Apps | Goals | Apps | Goals | Apps | Goals |
|---|---|---|---|---|---|---|---|---|---|---|
| SPAL | 2018–19 | Serie A | 0 | 0 | 0 | 0 | — | | 0 | 0 |
| SPAL | 2019–20 | Serie A | 2 | 0 | 1 | 0 | — | | 3 | 0 |
| SPAL | 2020–21 | Serie B | 13 | 0 | 3 | 0 | — | | 16 | 0 |
| SPAL | 2021–22 | Serie B | 19 | 0 | 1 | 0 | — | | 20 | 0 |
| SPAL | 2022–23 | Serie B | 2 | 0 | 1 | 0 | — | | 3 | 0 |
| SPAL | Total | | 36 | 0 | 6 | 0 | — | | 42 | 0 |
| Fano (loan) | 2017–18 | Serie C | 18 | 0 | 0 | 0 | — | | 18 | 0 |
| Viterbese Castrense (loan) | 2018–19 | Serie C | 2 | 0 | 1 | 0 | 0 | 0 | 3 | 0 |
| Foggia (loan) | 2022–23 | Serie C | 12 | 0 | 1 | 0 | 2 | 0 | 15 | 0 |
| Juve Stabia (loan) | 2023–24 | Serie C | 36 | 0 | 0 | 0 | 2 | 0 | 38 | 0 |
| Juve Stabia (loan) | 2024–25 | Serie B | 38 | 0 | 0 | 0 | 3 | 0 | 41 | 0 |
| Juve Stabia (loan) | Total | | 74 | 0 | 0 | 0 | 5 | 0 | 79 | 0 |
| Monza | 2025–26 | Serie B | 38 | 0 | 1 | 0 | 4 | 0 | 43 | 0 |
| Monza | 2026–27 | Serie A | 3 | 0 | 2 | 0 | — | | 5 | 0 |
| Monza | Total | | 41 | 0 | 3 | 0 | 4 | 0 | 48 | 0 |
| Career total | | | 183 | 0 | 11 | 0 | 11 | 0 | 205 | 0 |

== Honours ==
=== Player ===
Juve Stabia

- Serie C: 2023–24 (Group C)
