= Sebastiano Esposito =

Italian footballer (born 2002)

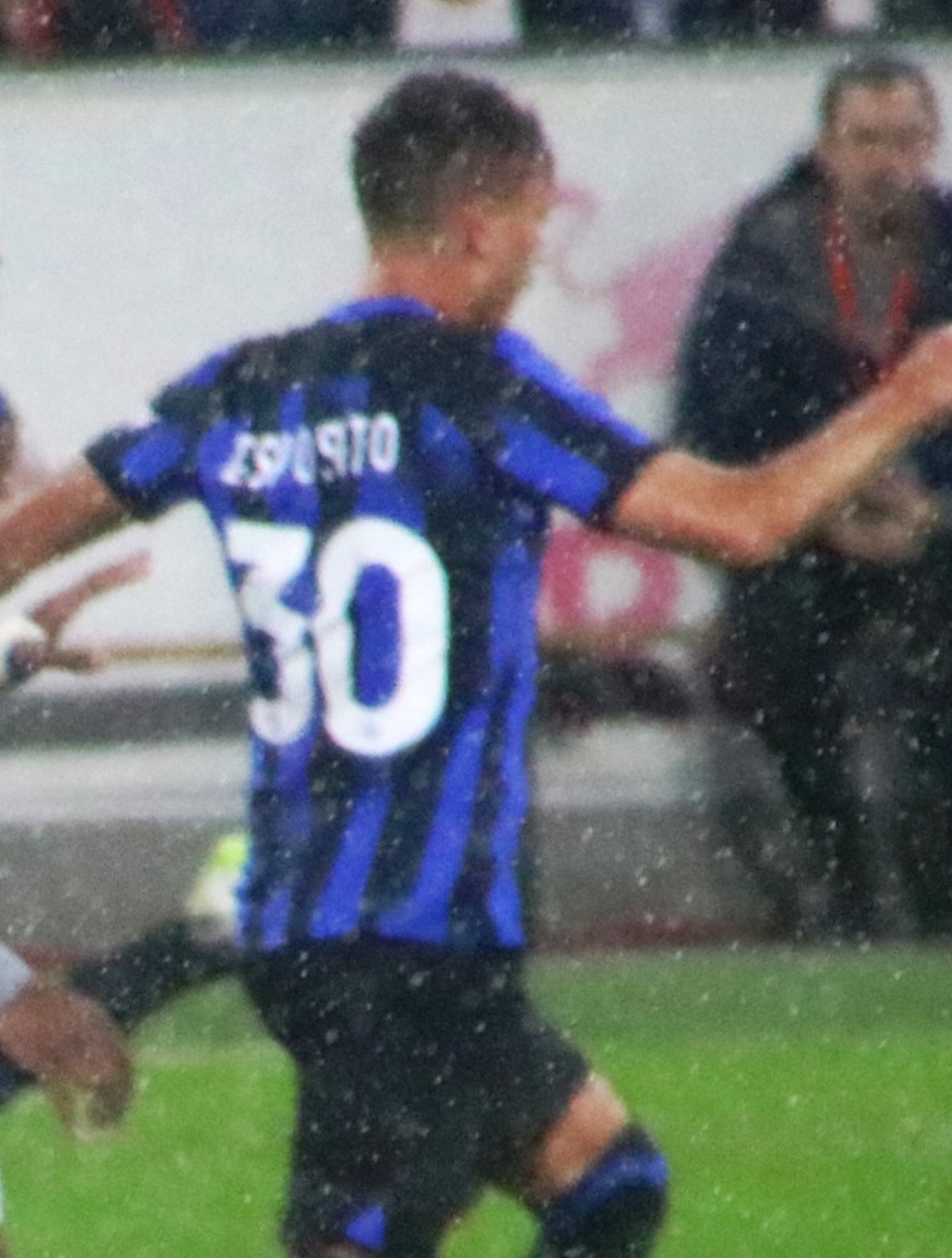
- Esposito with Inter Milan in 2023

Personal information
- Date of birth: 2 July 2002 (age 24)
- Place of birth: Castellammare di Stabia, Naples, Italy
- Height: 1.83 m (6 ft 0 in)
- Position: Forward

Team information
- Current team: Sassuolo (on loan from Cagliari)
- Number: 94

Youth career
- 2006–2011: Club Napoli
- 2011–2014: Brescia
- 2014–2019: Inter Milan

Senior career*
Years	Team	Apps	(Gls)
2019–2026	Inter Milan	7	(1)
2020–2021	→ SPAL (loan)	10	(1)
2021	→ Venezia (loan)	18	(2)
2021–2022	→ Basel (loan)	23	(6)
2022–2023	→ Anderlecht (loan)	14	(1)
2023	→ Bari (loan)	11	(4)
2023–2024	→ Sampdoria (loan)	22	(6)
2024–2025	→ Empoli (loan)	33	(8)
2025–2026	→ Cagliari (loan)	36	(7)
2026–	Cagliari	0	(0)
2026–	→ Sassuolo (loan)	6	(2)

International career^{‡}
2017–2018	Italy U16	12	(8)
2018–2019	Italy U17	20	(14)
2019	Italy U18	2	(1)
2019	Italy U19	3	(2)
2022	Italy U20	2	(0)
2020–2025	Italy U21	13	(1)
2026–	Italy	3	(0)
Medal record
Men's football
Representing Italy
UEFA European Under-17 Championship
Runner-up	2019 Ireland
- * Club domestic league appearances and goals as of 19:40, 27 October 2026 (UTC) ‡ National team caps and goals as of 12 November 2026

Sebastiano Esposito (Italian pronunciation: [sebaˈstjaːno eˈspɔːzito]; born 2 July 2002) is an Italian professional footballer who plays as a forward for Serie A club Sassuolo, on loan from Cagliari, and the Italy national team.

== Club career ==
=== Inter Milan ===
Esposito made his professional debut for Inter Milan at 16 years old, on 14 March 2019, in the second leg of Europa League match against Eintracht Frankfurt, coming in as a substitute for Borja Valero in the 73rd minute. He became the youngest player ever to feature in a European competition match for the club.

The following season, on 23 October 2019 he made his debut in Champions League, replacing Romelu Lukaku in the group stage match against Borussia Dortmund, and becoming the first player born in 2002 and the second youngest ever for the club to feature in a Champions League/European Cup match, after Giuseppe Bergomi. On 26 October, he made his Serie A debut, aged 17, coming as a substitute for Lautaro Martínez in a home match against Parma in San Siro. On 21 December 2019, Esposito scored his first goal for Inter, on his full debut, from a penalty in a 4–0 win at home against Genoa. On 15 June 2020, he was nominated for the Golden Boy award.

==== 2020–21 season: Loans to SPAL and Venezia ====
On 25 September 2020, he joined SPAL on loan. On 15 January 2021, Esposito joined Venezia on loan.

==== 2021–22 season: Loan to Basel ====
On 13 July 2021, he was loaned to Swiss club Basel, with an option to buy. Basel confirmed the loan deal on the same day and Esposito joined Basel's first team for their 2021–22 season under head coach Patrick Rahmen. After playing in one test game, Esposito played his debut for his new club in the second qualifying round of the 2021–22 UEFA Europa Conference League, a home game in the St. Jakob-Park on 22 July 2021, as Basel won 3–0 against Partizani Tirana. Three days later, on 25 July, Esposito made his Swiss Super League debut for Basel against Grasshoppers and scored his first goal for the club in the same game as they recorded 2–0 victory.

At the end of the season, Basel decided not to pull the purchase option. During his time with the club, Esposito played a total of 39 games for Basel, scoring a total of nine goals. 23 of these games were in the Swiss Super League, one in the Swiss Cup, ten in the UEFA Europa Conference League, and five were friendly games. He scored six goals in the domestic league, one in the Conference League, and the other two were scored during the test games.

==== 2022–23 season: Loans to Anderlecht and Bari ====
On 4 July 2022, Esposito joined Belgian club Anderlecht on loan. On 31 January 2023, Esposito moved on a new loan to Bari in Serie B.

==== Loans to Sampdoria and Empoli ====
On 22 August 2023, Esposito joined Serie B club Sampdoria on loan.

On 17 July 2024, Esposito joined Serie A side Empoli on loan. Despite the club's relegation to Serie B, he recorded a personal best by scoring 8 goals during the season.

==== Return to Inter ====
Following his loan spell, he returned to his parent club, Inter Milan, to take part in the 2025 FIFA Club World Cup. He started for Inter in their first match in the competition against Monterrey.

=== Cagliari ===
On 12 August 2025, Esposito joined fellow Serie A side Cagliari on a season-long loan with an obligation to make the transfer permanent for €4 million, which was activated by the club on 1 July 2026.

==== Loan to Sassuolo ====
On 29 August 2026, amid a contract dispute with Cagliari, Esposito joined Sassuolo on a season-long loan with an option to buy for €11 million.

== International career ==
He took part in the 2019 UEFA European Under-17 Championship, reaching the final of the tournament.

Esposito made his debut with the Italy U21 on 3 September 2020, in a friendly match won 2–1 against Slovenia.

He was one of the players who were called up with the Italy national team by head coach Roberto Mancini for the 2026–27 UEFA Nations League matches against Belgium, Turkey and France between 25 September and 5 October 2026. He made his debut on 28 September 2026, playing in the starting XI as a forward on the left wing in the Nations League game against Turkey alongside his brother Pio, the first time two brothers started together in an Italian national team game since 1915.

== Personal life ==
He is the younger brother of midfielder Salvatore Esposito, and the older brother of striker Pio Esposito.

== Career statistics ==
=== Club ===
As of match played 27 October 2026

Appearances and goals by club, season and competition
Club	Season	League			National cup (Note: Includes Coppa Italia, Swiss Cup)		Europe		Other		Total	
Club	Season	Division	Apps	Goals	Apps	Goals	Apps	Goals	Apps	Goals	Apps	Goals
Inter Milan	2018–19	Serie A	0	0	0	0	1 (Note: Appearance in UEFA Europa League)	0	—		1	0
Inter Milan	2019–20	Serie A	7	1	2	0	5 (Note: Three appearances in UEFA Champions League, two appearances in UEFA Europa League)	0	—		14	1
Inter Milan	2024–25	Serie A	—		—		—		4 (Note: Appearances in FIFA Club World Cup)	0	4	0
Inter Milan	Total		7	1	2	0	6	0	4	0	19	1
SPAL (loan)	2020–21	Serie B	10	1	3	0	—		—		13	1
Venezia (loan)	2020–21	Serie B	19	2	0	0	—		—		19	2
Basel (loan)	2021–22	Swiss Super League	23	6	1	0	10 (Note: Appearances in UEFA Europa Conference League)	1	—		34	7
Anderlecht (loan)	2022–23	Belgian Pro League	14	1	0	0	7	1	—		21	2
Bari (loan)	2022–23	Serie B	11	4	—		—		4 (Note: Appearance(s) in Serie B promotion play-offs)	0	15	4
Sampdoria (loan)	2023–24	Serie B	22	6	—		—		1	0	23	6
Empoli (loan)	2024–25	Serie A	33	8	2	2	—		—		35	10
Cagliari (loan)	2025–26	Serie A	35	7	3	1	—		—		38	8
Cagliari	2026–27	Serie A	0	0	0	0	—		—		0	0
Sassuolo (loan)	2026–27	Serie A	6	2	1	0	—		—		7	2
Career total			178	38	12	3	23	2	9	0	224	43

=== International ===
As of match played 12 November 2026

Appearances and goals by national team and year
National team	Year	Apps	Goals
Italy	2026	3	0
Total		3	0

== Honours ==
Inter Milan

- UEFA Europa League runner-up: 2019–20

Italy U17

- UEFA European Under-17 Championship runner-up: 2019

Individual

- UEFA European Under-17 Championship Team of the Tournament: 2019
