= Alessandro Murgia =

Italian footballer (born 1996)

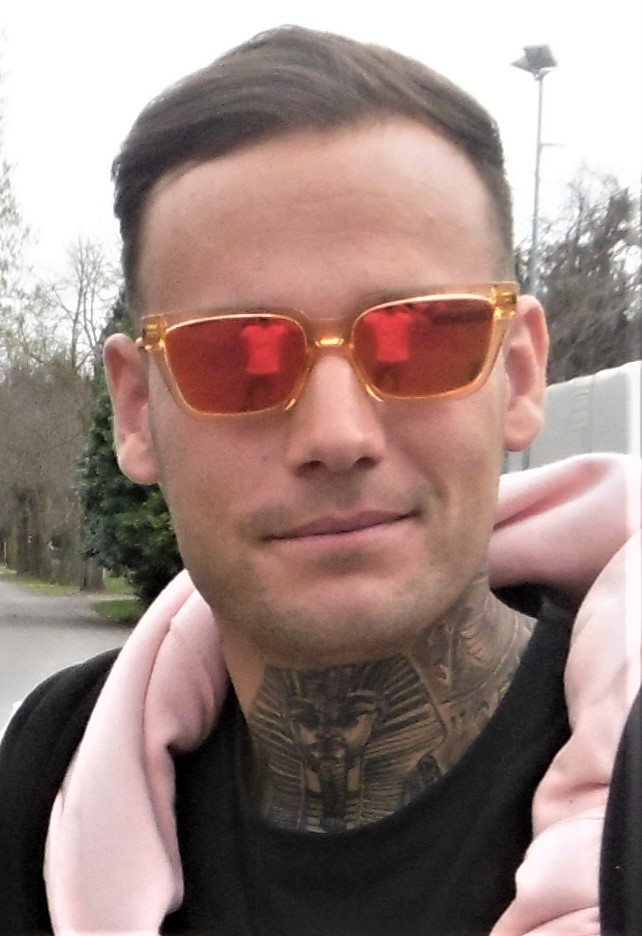

Personal information
- Date of birth: 9 August 1996 (age 30)
- Place of birth: Rome, Italy
- Height: 1.85 m (6 ft 1 in)
- Position: Midfielder

Team information
- Current team: Guidonia

Youth career
- 2001–2012: CS Colombo
- 2012–2016: Lazio

Senior career*
Years	Team	Apps	(Gls)
2016–2019	Lazio	31	(2)
2019	→ SPAL (loan)	15	(0)
2019–2025	SPAL	67	(1)
2021–2022	→ Perugia (loan)	4	(0)
2023–2025	→ Hermannstadt (loan)	62	(6)
2025–2026	Universitatea Cluj	19	(1)
2026–	Guidonia	2	(0)

International career
2014	Italy U18	4	(0)
2014–2015	Italy U19	4	(0)
2017–2019	Italy U21	14	(1)
- * Club domestic league appearances and goals as of 30 August 2026

Alessandro Murgia (Italian pronunciation: [alesˈsandro ˈmurdʒa]; born 9 August 1996) is an Italian professional footballer who plays as a midfielder for Serie C Group B club Guidonia.

== Club career ==
=== Lazio ===
Murgia made his debut for Lazio in the 2016–17 season on 17 September 2016 in a 3–0 home win over Pescara. He scored his first goal for the club on 23 October 2016 in a 2–2 away draw against Torino.

On 13 August 2017, Murgia scored the winning goal of the Supercoppa Italiana against Juventus with a final score of 3–2. On 14 September, Murgia started in his first match in European competitions, and scored the match winner of a 3–2 away victory over Vitesse in Lazio's first match of the 2017–18 UEFA Europa League.

==== Loan to SPAL ====
On 30 January 2019, Murgia joined to Serie A club SPAL on loan until 30 June 2019.

=== SPAL ===
On 12 July 2019, Murgia joined SPAL after 6-month loan, he signed until 2024.

==== Loan to Perugia ====
On 31 August 2021, he joined Perugia on loan.

==== Hermannstadt ====
On 9 August 2023, Murgia joined Romanian Superliga club Hermannstadt on loan.

== International career ==
Murgia made his debut with the Italy U21 team on 1 September 2017, in a friendly 3–0 loss against Spain.

== Personal life ==
Murgia is a brother in-law to footballer Andrea Bertolacci who married his sister, Nicole, who is an actress.

== Career statistics ==
As of match played on 30 August 2026

Appearances and goals by club, season and competition
Club	Season	League			National cup (Note: Includes Coppa Italia, Cupa României)		Europe		Other		Total	
Club	Season	Division	Apps	Goals	Apps	Goals	Apps	Goals	Apps	Goals	Apps	Goals
Lazio	2016–17	Serie A	14	2	4	0	—		—		18	2
Lazio	2017–18	Serie A	16	0	1	0	9 (Note: Appearances in UEFA Europa League)	1	1 (Note: Appearance in Supercoppa Italiana)	1	27	2
Lazio	2018–19	Serie A	1	0	0	0	3	0	—		4	0
Lazio	Total		31	2	5	0	12	1	1	1	49	4
SPAL (loan)	2018–19	Serie A	15	0	—		—		—		15	0
SPAL	2019–20	Serie A	25	0	3	1	—		—		28	1
SPAL	2020–21	Serie B	23	1	4	0	—		—		27	1
SPAL	2021–22	Serie B	1	0	1	0	—		—		2	0
SPAL	2022–23	Serie B	18	0	2	0	—		—		20	0
SPAL	Total		82	1	10	1	—		—		92	2
Perugia (loan)	2021–22	Serie B	4	0	—		—		—		4	0
Hermannstadt (loan)	2023–24	Liga I	24	1	4	0	—		—		28	1
Hermannstadt (loan)	2024–25	Liga I	38	5	5	0	—		—		43	5
Hermannstadt (loan)	Total		62	6	9	0	—		—		71	6
Universitatea Cluj	2025–26	Liga I	19	1	2	0	2 (Note: Appearances in UEFA Conference League)	0	—		23	1
Guidonia	2026–27	Serie C	2	0	0	0	—		—		2	0
Career total			200	10	26	1	14	1	1	1	241	13

== Honours ==
Lazio

- Coppa Italia runner-up: 2016–17
- Supercoppa Italiana: 2017

Hermannstadt

- Cupa României runner-up: 2024–25

Universitatea Cluj

- Cupa României runner-up: 2025–26
