= Mark Pabai =

Liberian footballer (born 2000)

Personal information
- Date of birth: 30 September 2000 (age 26)
- Place of birth: Monrovia, Liberia
- Height: 1.89 m (6 ft 2 in)
- Position: Defender

Team information
- Current team: De Graafschap

Youth career
- –2011: CDW Wijk bij Duurstede
- 2011–2019: Utrecht
- 2022: SPAL

Senior career*
Years	Team	Apps	(Gls)
2019–2021	Jong Utrecht	60	(3)
2021–2022	PEC Zwolle	9	(0)
2022	SPAL	1	(0)
2023	Tabor Sežana	8	(0)
2023–2026	Koper	73	(0)
2026–	De Graafschap	0	(0)

International career^{‡}
2021–	Liberia	15	(0)
- * Club domestic league appearances and goals as of 12 June 2026 ‡ National team caps and goals as of 12 June 2026

Mark Pabai (born 30 September 2000) is a Liberian professional footballer who plays as a defender for Eerste Divisie club De Graafschap and the Liberia national team.

== Club career ==
Pabai is a youth academy graduate of Utrecht. He made his professional debut for the club's reserve side on 8 March 2019 in a 3–1 defeat against Jong PSV. On 3 August 2021, he joined Eredivisie club PEC Zwolle on a two-year deal.

On 20 January 2022, he signed a two-and-a-half-year contract with Serie B club SPAL in Italy. On 1 September 2022, Pabai's contract with SPAL was terminated by mutual consent.

== International career ==
In October 2021, Pabai received a call-up from Liberia for two 2022 World Cup qualifying matches against Cape Verde. He debuted in a 2–0 World Cup qualification loss to Nigeria on 13 November 2021.

== Personal life ==
Born in Liberia, Pabai moved to the Netherlands with his family when he was six years old.

== Career statistics ==
=== Club ===
As of match played 9 November 2024

Appearances and goals by club, season and competition
Club	Season	League			National cup (Note: Includes KNVB Cup, Slovenian Cup)		Total	
Club	Season	Division	Apps	Goals	Apps	Goals	Apps	Goals
Jong Utrecht	2018–19	Eerste Divisie	11	1	—		11	1
Jong Utrecht	2019–20	Eerste Divisie	16	1	—		16	1
Jong Utrecht	2020–21	Eerste Divisie	33	1	—		33	1
Jong Utrecht	Total		60	3	0	0	60	3
PEC Zwolle	2021–22	Eredivisie	9	0	2	0	11	0
SPAL	2021–22	Serie B	1	0	—		1	0
Tabor Sežana	2022–23	Slovenian PrvaLiga	8	0	1	0	9	0
Koper	2023–24	Slovenian PrvaLiga	31	0	2	0	33	0
Koper	2024–25	Slovenian PrvaLiga	10	0	1	0	11	0
Koper	Total		41	0	3	0	44	0
Career total			119	3	6	0	125	3

=== International ===
As of match played 31 March 2026

Appearances and goals by national team and year
National team	Year	Apps	Goals
Liberia	2021	2	0
Liberia	2022	3	0
Liberia	2023	5	0
Liberia	2024	2	0
Liberia	2025	2	0
Liberia	2026	1	0
Total		15	0
