= Salvatore Esposito (footballer, born 2000) =

Italian footballer (born 2000)

Personal information
- Full name: Salvatore Esposito
- Date of birth: 7 October 2000 (age 26)
- Place of birth: Castellammare di Stabia, Italy
- Height: 1.78 m (5 ft 10 in)
- Position: Defensive midfielder

Team information
- Current team: Sampdoria
- Number: 94

Youth career
- 2011–2014: Brescia
- 2014–2018: Inter
- 2018: → SPAL (loan)

Senior career*
Years	Team	Apps	(Gls)
2018–2023	SPAL	83	(10)
2019	→ Ravenna (loan)	14	(2)
2019–2020	→ Chievo (loan)	39	(1)
2023	→ Spezia (loan)	15	(1)
2023–	Spezia	83	(9)
2026	→ Sampdoria (loan)	11	(0)
2026–	Sampdoria	3	(0)

International career^{‡}
2019	Italy U19	4	(0)
2019	Italy U20	10	(0)
2019–2023	Italy U21	10	(0)
2022	Italy	1	(0)
- * Club domestic league appearances and goals as of 12:53, 13 November 2026 (UTC) ‡ National team caps and goals as of 11 June 2022

Salvatore Esposito (Italian pronunciation: [salvaˈtoːre eˈspɔːzito]; born 7 October 2000) is an Italian professional footballer who plays as a defensive midfielder for Serie B club Sampdoria. He has represented the Italy national team.

== Club career ==
Esposito first joined SPAL on loan from the Inter U-19 squad in January 2018. He made several bench appearances for SPAL late in the 2017–18 Serie A season. The same year in 29 June, SPAL secured his permanent transfer from Inter.

On 9 January 2019, Esposito was loaned to Serie C club Ravenna until the end of the season. The same year on 22 January, he made his Serie C debut against Triestina as a half-time substitute for Carlo Martorelli and scored a late equalizer in a 2–2 draw.

On 11 July 2019, Esposito joined Serie B club Chievo on loan until 30 June 2020.

On 6 January 2023, Esposito joined Serie A club Spezia on loan with an obligation to buy. He scored his first goal for the club with a direct free kick against AC Milan.

On 4 January 2026, Esposito moved to Sampdoria on loan with a conditional obligation to buy, signing a contract with Sampdoria until 30 June 2030 that would be in place if the transfer is made permanent.

== International career ==
On 16 January 2019, Esposito debuted for the Italy U19 in a friendly against Spain and scored a goal in a 3–0 victory.

Esposito was selected in the Italian senior squad that ranged from the 2022 Finalissima against Argentina until the second leg of 2022–23 UEFA Nations League group stage match against Germany. He debuted against England in the latter tournament on 11 June 2022.

== Personal life ==
He is the older brother of strikers Sebastiano Esposito and Pio Esposito.

== Career statistics ==
As of match played 29 December 2024

Appearances and goals by club, season and competition
Club	Season	League			National cup		Other		Total	
Club	Season	Division	Apps	Goals	Apps	Goals	Apps	Goals	Apps	Goals
Ravenna	2018–19	Serie C	14	2	—		—		14	2
Chievo	2019–20	Serie B	39	1	2	0	—		41	1
SPAL	2020–21	Serie B	31	5	3	0	—		34	5
SPAL	2021–22	Serie B	35	3	1	0	—		36	3
SPAL	2022–23	Serie B	17	2	2	0	—		19	2
SPAL	Total		83	10	6	0	0	0	89	10
Spezia (loan)	2022–23	Serie A	15	1	1	0	1 (Note: Appearance in Serie A relegation tie-breaker)	0	17	1
Spezia	2023–24	Serie B	37	1	2	0	—		39	1
Spezia	2023–24	Serie B	20	5	1	0	—		21	5
Spezia	Total		72	7	4	0	1	0	77	7
Career total			208	20	12	0	1	0	221	20
