= Simone Missiroli =

Italian footballer

Personal information
- Date of birth: 23 May 1986 (age 40)
- Place of birth: Reggio Calabria, Italy
- Height: 1.91 m (6 ft 3 in)
- Position: Midfielder

Senior career*
Years	Team	Apps	(Gls)
2004–2011	Reggina	153	(21)
2008–2009	→ Treviso (loan)	33	(2)
2011	→ Cagliari (loan)	16	(0)
2012–2018	Sassuolo	189	(16)
2018–2021	SPAL	99	(1)
2021–2022	Cesena	23	(0)

International career^{‡}
2005–2006	Italy U20	2	(0)
- * Club domestic league appearances and goals as of 23 April 2022 ‡ National team caps and goals as of 22 February 2006

Simone Missiroli (born 23 May 1986) is an Italian former footballer who played as a midfielder.

== Club career ==
=== Reggina ===
A native of Reggio Calabria, he made his Serie A debut with the local team Reggina on 24 April 2005 against Brescia Calcio. He also spent the 2008–09 season on loan at Treviso, and returned to Reggina to help his hometown club in their 2009–10 Serie B campaign. In January 2011 he left for Cagliari in a temporary deal for €1 million.

=== Sassuolo ===
On 4 January 2012, Missiroli moved to Serie B side U.S. Sassuolo Calcio for €3.5 million. Before leaving Reggina, Missiroli was one of the team topscorers of the 2011–12 season as a playmaker. Missiroli was also named the captain of the team, wearing the armband on several occasions, such as the game against Sassuolo.

On 11 January 2016, he signed a new 4 1/2-year contract with Sassuolo.

=== SPAL ===
On 17 August 2018, Missiroli signed with Serie A club SPAL.

=== Cesena ===
On 26 September 2021 joined Serie C side Cesena on a deal until the end of the season.

== International career ==
Missiroli played two matches for Italy U20 team.

== Career statistics ==
As of match played 22 December 2021

Appearances and goals by club, season and competition
Club	Season	League			National Cup		Continental		Other		Total	
Club	Season	Division	Apps	Goals	Apps	Goals	Apps	Goals	Apps	Goals	Apps	Goals
Reggina	2004–05	Serie A	4	0	1	0	—		—		5	0
Reggina	2005–06	Serie A	25	2	2	1	—		—		27	3
Reggina	2006–07	Serie A	22	0	5	0	—		—		27	0
Reggina	2007–08	Serie A	24	1	1	0	—		—		25	1
Reggina	2008–09	Serie A	0	0	1	0	—		—		1	0
Reggina	2009–10	Serie B	36	7	2	1	—		—		38	8
Reggina	2010–11	Serie B	22	4	1	0	—		—		23	4
Reggina	2011–12	Serie B	20	7	2	1	—		—		22	8
Reggina	Total		153	21	15	3	0	0	0	0	168	24
Treviso (loan)	2008–09	Serie B	33	2	0	0	—		—		33	2
Cagliari (loan)	2010–11	Serie A	16	0	0	0	—		—		16	0
Sassuolo	2011–12	Serie B	20	2	0	0	—		2 (Note: Appearance(s) in Promotion Playoffs)	0	22	2
Sassuolo	2012–13	Serie B	37	6	2	0	—		—		39	6
Sassuolo	2013–14	Serie A	27	1	2	0	—		—		29	1
Sassuolo	2014–15	Serie A	33	4	2	0	—		—		35	4
Sassuolo	2015–16	Serie A	24	2	1	0	—		—		25	2
Sassuolo	2016–17	Serie A	13	0	0	0	2 (Note: Appearance(s) in UEFA Europa League)	0	—		15	0
Sassuolo	2017–18	Serie A	35	1	2	1	—		—		37	2
Sassuolo	Total		189	16	9	1	2	0	2	0	202	17
SPAL	2018–19	Serie A	34	0	0	0	—		—		34	0
SPAL	2019–20	Serie A	34	1	2	0	—		—		36	1
SPAL	2020–21	Serie B	31	0	5	1	—		—		36	1
SPAL	Total		99	1	7	1	0	0	0	0	106	2
Cesena	2021–22	Serie C	13	0	0	0	—		—		13	0
Career total			503	40	31	5	2	0	2	0	538	45
