= Alberto Barison =

Italian football player (born 1994)

Personal information
- Date of birth: 3 August 1994 (age 32)
- Place of birth: Dolo, Italy
- Height: 1.86 m (6 ft 1 in)
- Position: Defender

Team information
- Current team: Luparense

Youth career
- –2013: Padova

Senior career*
Years	Team	Apps	(Gls)
2013–2014	Padova	0	(0)
2013–2014	→ Perugia (loan)	1	(0)
2014–2015	Ascoli	5	(0)
2015–2018	Bassano	50	(2)
2017	→ Arezzo (loan)	11	(0)
2018–2022	Pordenone	104	(13)
2022–2023	Südtirol	0	(0)
2023	→ Trento (loan)	6	(0)
2023–2025	Trento	35	(0)
2025–	Luparense	5	(0)
- * Club domestic league appearances and goals as of 22 February 2026

Alberto Barison (born 3 August 1994) is an Italian football player who plays for Serie D club Luparense.

== Club career ==
He made his professional Serie C debut for Perugia on 5 January 2014 in a game against Nocerina.

He spent the next six season of his senior career in the third-tier Serie C, before advancing to Serie B with his club Pordenone for the 2019–20 season.

He made his Serie B debut for Pordenone on 26 August 2019 in a game against Frosinone. He started the game and played the whole match, also scoring the last goal in the 3–0 victory.

On 7 July 2022, Barison moved to Südtirol on a two-year contract with an option to extend for one more year. He did not make any appearances in the first part of the season, and on 12 January 2023 Barison moved on loan to Trento.

On 11 August 2023, Barison returned to Trento on a permanent basis and signed a two-year contract.
