= Riccardo Mastrilli =

Italian footballer

Personal information
- Date of birth: 30 May 1997 (age 29)
- Place of birth: Giulianova, Italy
- Height: 1.85 m (6 ft 1 in)
- Position: Left midfielder

Team information
- Current team: Torrese

Senior career*
Years	Team	Apps	(Gls)
2015–2016	Città di Giulianova	22	(4)
2016–2017	Gozzano	26	(1)
2017–2020	SPAL	0	(0)
2017–2018	→ Pontedera (loan)	6	(2)
2018–2019	→ Teramo (loan)	12	(0)
2019	→ Bisceglie (loan)	12	(0)
2020–	Pontevomano		
- * Club domestic league appearances and goals as of 2 August 2020

Riccardo Mastrilli (born 30 May 1997) is an Italian football player who plays for Torrese.

== Club career ==
He made his Serie C debut for Pontedera on 3 September 2017 in a game against Lucchese.

On 19 January 2019, he joined Bisceglie on loan.

On 10 October 2020, he moved to Eccellenza club Pontevomano.
