= Jakub Iskra =

Polish footballer

Personal information
- Full name: Jakub Cezary Iskra
- Date of birth: 13 August 2002 (age 24)
- Place of birth: Gryfino, Poland
- Height: 1.83 m (6 ft 0 in)
- Position: Right-back

Team information
- Current team: Warta Gorzów Wielkopolski
- Number: 2

Youth career
- GUKS Widuchowa
- Energetyk Gryfino
- 2014–2015: Orlik Trzcińsko Zdrój
- 2015: Hetman Grzybno
- 2015–2018: Pogoń Szczecin
- 2018–2020: SPAL

Senior career*
Years	Team	Apps	(Gls)
2020–2022	SPAL	2	(0)
2021–2022	→ Śląsk Wrocław (loan)	8	(0)
2021–2022	→ Śląsk Wrocław II (loan)	3	(1)
2022–2023	Sandecja Nowy Sącz	21	(1)
2023–2024	FC Schwedt 02	6	(2)
2024–2025	GKS Jastrzębie	36	(1)
2025–	Warta Gorzów Wielkopolski	22	(4)

International career
2017–2018	Poland U16	11	(0)
2018–2019	Poland U17	9	(0)
2020	Poland U19	2	(0)
2021–2022	Poland U20	7	(0)
- * Club domestic league appearances and goals as of 17:11, 4 June 2026 (UTC)

Jakub Cezary Iskra (born 13 August 2002) is a Polish professional footballer who plays as a right-back for III liga club Warta Gorzów Wielkopolski.

== Career ==
On 27 July 2020, he made his Serie A debut in a 1–1 home draw against Torino.

On 30 August 2021, he joined Śląsk Wrocław on loan that ended on 9 June 2022. During his spell with Polish club, he featured in eight Ekstraklasa games and one Polish Cup fixture. He did not score any goals.

On 11 July 2022, he returned to Poland yet again to join I liga club Sandecja Nowy Sącz on a two-year deal with an extension option.

== Career statistics ==
As of match played 30 May 2026

Appearances and goals by club, season and competition
Club	Season	League			National cup (Note: Includes Polish Cup)		Continental		Other		Total	
Club	Season	Division	Apps	Goals	Apps	Goals	Apps	Goals	Apps	Goals	Apps	Goals
SPAL	2019–20	Serie A	2	0	0	0	—		0	0	2	0
Śląsk Wrocław (loan)	2021–22	Ekstraklasa	8	0	1	0	0	0	—		9	0
Śląsk Wrocław II (loan)	2021–22	II liga	3	1	0	0	—		—		3	1
Sandecja Nowy Sącz	2022–23	I liga	21	1	2	0	—		—		23	1
FC Schwedt 02	2023–24	Landesliga	6	2	—		—		—		6	2
GKS Jastrzębie	2023–24	II liga	11	1	—		—		—		11	1
GKS Jastrzębie	2024–25	II liga	25	0	0	0	—		—		25	0
GKS Jastrzębie	Total		36	1	0	0	—		—		36	1
Warta Gorzów Wielkopolski	2025–26	III liga, group III	22	4	—		—		—		22	4
Career total			98	9	3	0	0	0	0	0	101	9
