= Federico Di Francesco =

Italian footballer

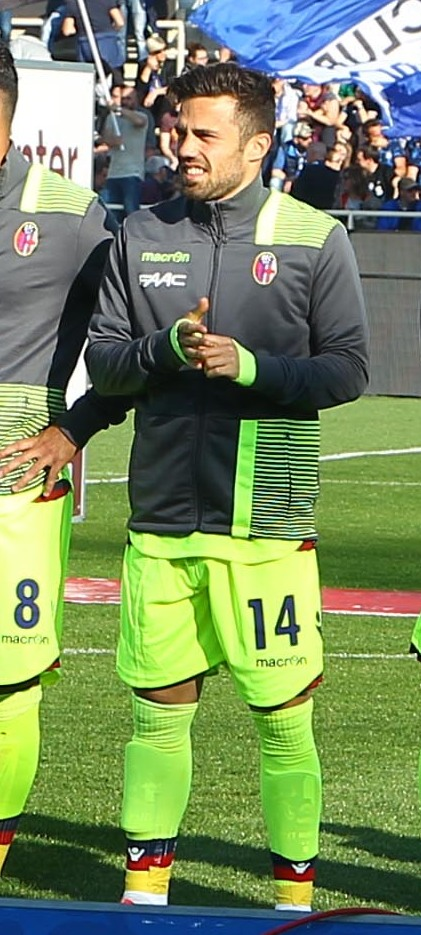
- Di Francesco with Bologna in 2017

Personal information
- Full name: Federico Di Francesco
- Date of birth: 14 June 1994 (age 32)
- Place of birth: Pisa, Italy
- Height: 1.71 m (5 ft 7 in)
- Positions: Winger; forward

Team information
- Current team: Catanzaro (on loan from Palermo)
- Number: 94

Youth career
- 2010–2013: Pescara

Senior career*
Years	Team	Apps	(Gls)
2013	Pescara	7	(0)
2013–2015	Parma	0	(0)
2013–2014	→ Gubbio (loan)	11	(0)
2014	→ Pescara (loan)	1	(0)
2014–2015	→ Cremonese (loan)	27	(5)
2015–2016	Virtus Lanciano	37	(8)
2016–2018	Bologna	48	(5)
2018–2021	Sassuolo	19	(2)
2019–2021	→ SPAL (loan)	47	(6)
2021–2022	SPAL	1	(0)
2021–2022	→ Empoli (loan)	26	(5)
2022–2023	Lecce	38	(3)
2023–	Palermo	61	(6)
2025–	→ Catanzaro (loan)	14	(1)

International career^{‡}
2013	Italy U19	2	(0)
2016–2017	Italy U21	6	(3)
- * Club domestic league appearances and goals as of 10 May 2026 ‡ National team caps and goals as of 27 March 2017

Federico Di Francesco (born 14 June 1994) is an Italian professional footballer who plays as a winger or forward for Serie B club Catanzaro, on loan from Palermo.

== Club career ==
=== Pescara ===
Di Francesco began his career on Pescara's youth categories. In the 2012–13 season, he was the captain of the Primavera team, and was subsequently called up by manager Cristian Bucchi to the first team.

On 30 March 2013, Di Francesco made his professional debut, playing the last three minutes in a 3–0 away loss against Parma.

=== Parma ===
In August, Di Francesco joined Parma in a co-ownership deal for €500, and was subsequently loaned to Gubbio. Parma subsidized Gubbio €100,000.

In January 2014, he returned to Pescara on loan. In June 2014, Parma signed him outright for an undisclosed fee.

On 8 August 2014, he left for Cremonese.

On 25 June 2015, Di Francesco became a free agent after the bankruptcy of Parma.

=== Lanciano ===
He was signed by Virtus Lanciano in a three-year contract on 8 July 2015.

=== Bologna ===
On 23 June 2016, Bologna signed Di Francesco from Lanciano for a reported €1.5 million.

=== Sassuolo ===
On 4 July 2018, Di Francesco signed a contract with Italian club Sassuolo.

==== Loan to SPAL ====
On 26 July 2019, Di Francesco joined SPAL on loan with an obligation to buy.

=== Lecce ===
On 31 July 2022, Di Francesco signed a three-year contract with Lecce.

=== Palermo ===
On 31 August 2023, Serie B club Palermo announced the signing of Di Francesco from Lecce on a three-year deal. Just two days later, Di Francesco scored on his debut, marking the final goal in a 3–0 home win against Feralpisalò.

=== Catanzaro ===
On 30 August 2025, Di Francesco signed for fellow Serie B club Catanzaro, on a loan deal with an obligation to buy.

== International career ==
On 2 September 2016, Di Francesco made his debut with Italy U21 as a substitute in a 1–1 home draw against Serbia in a 2017 European Championship qualification match. On 6 September, he scored a brace in a 3–0 win over Andorra in his nation's subsequent European qualifier.

== Style of play ==
Di Francesco is a small, quick and agile right-footed player, with an eye for goal; he usually plays as a right winger, but can also play on the left. He has also been deployed as a forward, or as a second striker.

== Personal life ==
Federico Di Francesco is the son of former professional player and manager Eusebio Di Francesco.

== Career statistics ==
=== Club ===
As of match played 20 August 2023

Appearances and goals by club, season and competition
Club	Season	League			Cup		Europe		Other		Total	
Club	Season	Division	Apps	Goals	Apps	Goals	Apps	Goals	Apps	Goals	Apps	Goals
Pescara	2012–13	Serie A	7	0	0	0	–		–		7	0
Pescara	2013–14	Serie B	0	0	1	0	–		–		1	0
Parma	2013–14	Serie A	0	0	0	0	–		–		0	0
Gubbio (loan)	2013–14	Lega Pro	11	0	0	0	–		–		11	0
Pescara (loan)	2013–14	Serie B	1	0	0	0	–		–		1	0
Cremonese (loan)	2014–15	Lega Pro	27	5	2	0	–		–		29	5
Virtus Lanciano	2015–16	Serie B	36	8	1	0	–		1	0	38	8
Bologna	2016–17	Serie A	24	4	3	1	–		–		27	5
Bologna	2017–18	Serie A	24	1	1	0	–		–		25	1
Bologna	Total		48	5	4	1	–		–		52	6
Sassuolo	2018–19	Serie A	19	2	1	0	–		–		20	2
SPAL	2019–20	Serie A	20	2	1	1	–		–		21	3
SPAL	2020–21	Serie B	27	4	1	0	–		–		28	4
SPAL	2021–22	Serie B	1	0	1	0	–		–		2	0
SPAL	Total		48	6	3	1	–		–		51	7
Empoli	2021–22	Serie A	26	5	0	0	–		–		26	5
Lecce	2022–23	Serie A	36	2	1	0	–		–		37	2
Lecce	2023–24	Serie A	1	1	1	0	–		–		2	1
Lecce	Total		37	3	2	0	–		–		39	3
Career total			260	34	14	2	–		1	0	275	36
