= Riccardo Spaltro =

Italian footballer

Personal information
- Date of birth: 19 February 2000 (age 26)
- Place of birth: Rome, Italy
- Height: 1.85 m (6 ft 1 in)
- Position: Defender

Youth career
- –2016: Roma
- 2016–2018: SPAL

Senior career*
Years	Team	Apps	(Gls)
2018–2022	SPAL	6	(0)
2018	→ Clodiense (loan)	8	(0)
2018–2019	→ Arzignano (loan)	30	(0)
2019–2020	→ Cavese (loan)	23	(3)
2022	Renate	15	(0)
2022	SPAL	0	(0)
2022–2024	Crotone	8	(1)
2024	→ Potenza (loan)	8	(0)
2024–2025	Juve Stabia	0	(0)
2024–2025	→ Desenzano (loan)	24	(1)
2025–2026	Cerignola	29	(0)
- * Club domestic league appearances and goals as of 1 May 2026

Riccardo Spaltro (born 19 February 2000) is an Italian professional footballer who plays as a right-back.

== Club career ==
=== SPAL ===
He started playing for the Under-19 squad of SPAL in the 2016–17 season. He has not been called up to the senior squad.

==== Loans to Serie D ====
In 2017–18 and 2018–19, he was loaned to Serie D clubs Clodiense and Arzignano, respectively, achieving promotion to Serie C with Arzignano.

==== Loan to Cavese ====
On 9 July 2019 he signed his first professional contract with SPAL and was loaned to Serie C club Cavese for the 2019–20 season.

He made his professional Serie C debut for Cavese on 25 August 2019 in a game against Picerno. He started the game and was substituted in the 77th minute.

==== Return to SPAL ====
Upon his return from the Cavese loan, he made his Serie B debut for SPAL on 10 April 2021 against Lecce.

=== Renate ===
On 20 January 2022, he moved to Serie C club Renate.

=== Crotone ===
On 25 August 2022, Spaltro signed with Crotone who purchased his rights from SPAL (which, in turn, earlier bought him back from Renate).
