= Lorenzo Dickmann =

Italian footballer

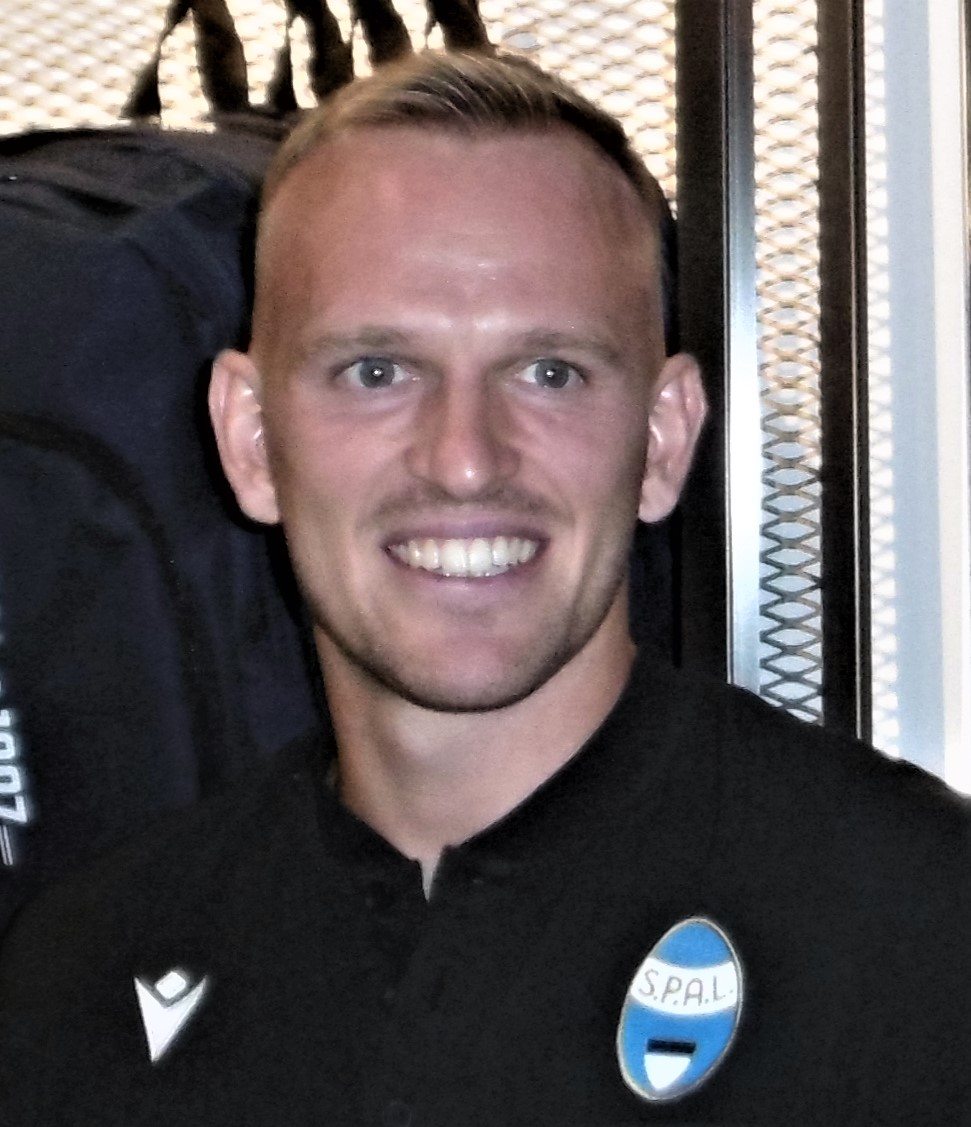

Personal information
- Full name: Lorenzo Maria Dickman
- Date of birth: 24 September 1996 (age 30)
- Place of birth: Milan, Italy
- Height: 1.77 m (5 ft 10 in)
- Position: Right-back

Team information
- Current team: OFI
- Number: 24

Youth career
- 2009–2010: Alcione
- 2010–2014: Novara

Senior career*
Years	Team	Apps	(Gls)
2014–2019	Novara	119	(6)
2018–2019	→ SPAL (loan)	6	(0)
2019–2024	SPAL	101	(6)
2019–2020	→ Chievo (loan)	32	(2)
2023–2024	→ Brescia (loan)	36	(1)
2024–2025	Brescia	36	(0)
2025–2026	Bari	26	(1)
2026–	OFI	5	(0)

International career^{‡}
2016	Italy U20	3	(0)
2017–2018	Italy U21	3	(0)
- * Club domestic league appearances and goals as of 20 September 2026 ‡ National team caps and goals as of 27 March 2018

Lorenzo Maria Dickmann (born 24 September 1996) is an Italian professional footballer who plays as a right-back for Super League Greece club OFI.

== Club career ==
On 2 September 2019, he joined Chievo on a season-long loan.

On 31 August 2023, Dickmann joined Brescia on loan with an option to buy. On 14 July 2024, Brescia exercised their option to make the transfer permanent.

On 9 July 2025, Dickmann moved to Bari on a two-year contract.

On 10 August 2026, Dickmann moved to OFI on a two-year contract, after being released as a free agent. He scored his first goal ten days later, during the first of the two UEFA Europa League playoff legs against CSKA Sofia.

== Honours ==
=== Club ===
Novara

- Lega Pro: 2014–15
- Supercoppa di Lega Pro: 2015

OFI

- Greek Super Cup: 2026
