= Georgi Tunjov =

Estonian footballer

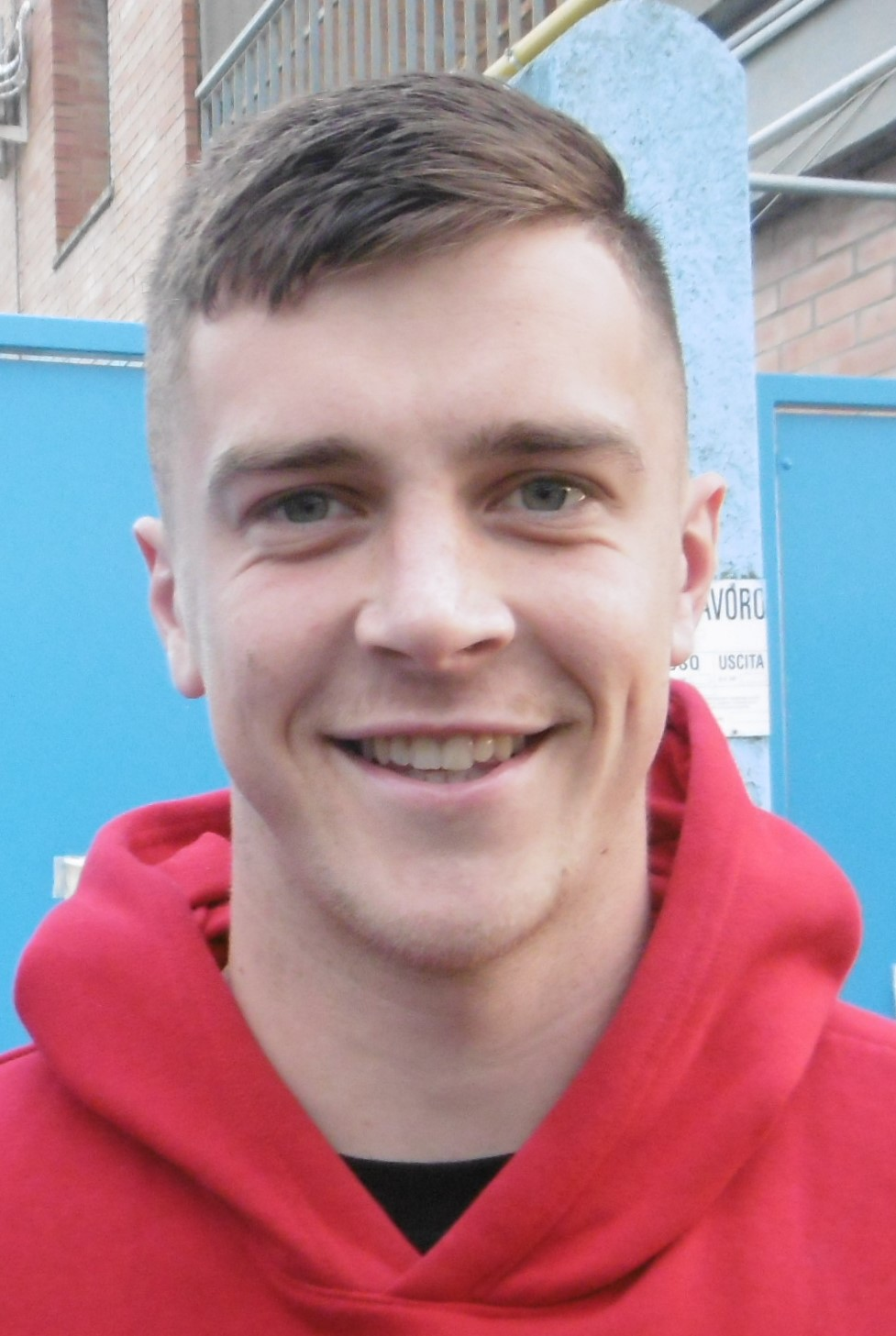

Personal information
- Date of birth: 17 April 2001 (age 25)
- Place of birth: Narva, Estonia
- Height: 1.86 m (6 ft 1 in)
- Position: Midfielder

Team information
- Current team: Sambenedettese
- Number: 8

Youth career
- 2009–2017: Narva Trans
- 2018–2019: SPAL

Senior career*
Years	Team	Apps	(Gls)
2016–2018	Narva Trans	25	(0)
2019–2023	SPAL	34	(0)
2021–2022	→ Carrarese (loan)	27	(3)
2023–2025	Pescara	42	(8)
2025	→ Pineto (loan)	14	(1)
2025–2026	Ospitaletto	10	(0)
2026	Pro Patria	12	(2)
2026–	Sambenedettese	0	(0)

International career^{‡}
2016	Estonia U16	2	(0)
2017	Estonia U17	15	(0)
2018–2019	Estonia U19	13	(1)
2021	Estonia U21	8	(0)
2020–	Estonia	16	(0)
- * Club domestic league appearances and goals as of 30 April 2026 ‡ National team caps and goals as of 1 April 2024

Georgi Tunjov (born 17 April 2001) is an Estonian professional footballer who plays as a midfielder for Italian Serie C Group B club Sambenedettese.

== Club career ==
=== SPAL ===
Tunjov started out playing for hometown team Narva Trans. In March 2018, he joined SPAL academy. Tunjov made his debut in the Serie A on 15 December 2019, coming on as a 73rd-minute substitute in the 1–3 away loss to Roma. On 13 February 2020, he signed his first professional contract with SPAL, lasting until 30 June 2023.

==== Loan to Carrarese ====
In August 2021, Tunjov joined Serie C club Carrarese on a loan deal.

== Career statistics ==
=== Club ===
As of match played 24 February 2024

Club	Season	League	League		Cup		Europe		Other		Total	
Club	Season	League	Apps	Goals	Apps	Goals	Apps	Goals	Apps	Goals	Apps	Goals
Narva Trans	2016	Meistriliiga	6	0	–		–		–		6	0
Narva Trans	2017	Meistriliiga	19	0	–		–		–		19	0
Narva Trans	2018	Meistriliiga	0	0	2	1	–		–		2	1
Narva Trans	Total		25	0	2	1	0	0	0	0	27	1
SPAL	2019–20	Serie A	10	0	1	0	–		–		11	0
SPAL	2020–21	Serie B	0	0	1	0	–		–		1	0
SPAL	2021–22	Serie B	1	0	0	0	–		–		1	0
SPAL	2022–23	Serie B	23	0	1	0	–		–		24	0
SPAL	Total		34	0	3	0	0	0	0	0	37	0
Carrarese (loan)	2021–22	Serie C	27	3	0	0	–		–		27	3
Pescara	2023-24	Serie C	22	7	–		–		–		22	7
Career total			108	10	5	1	0	0	0	0	113	11

=== International ===
As of 26 September 2022.

Appearances and goals by national team and year
National team	Year	Apps	Goals
Estonia
Estonia	2020	6	0
Estonia	2022	1	0
Total		7	0
