= Stadio Paolo Mazza =

Football stadium

Coordinates: 44°50′23″N 11°36′27″E

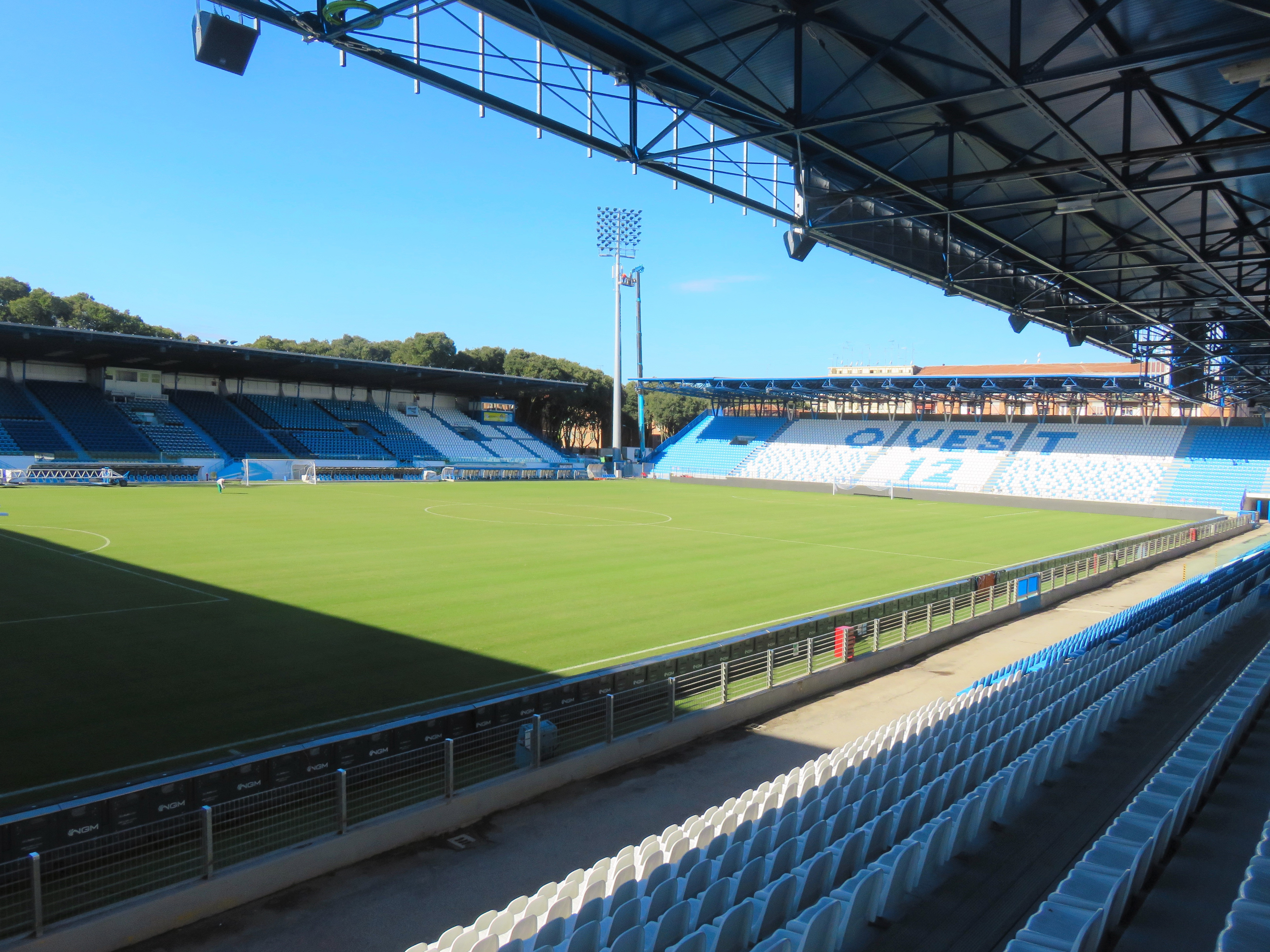
- Interactive map of Stadio Paolo Mazza
- Former names: Stadio Comunale
- Location: Ferrara, Italy
- Owner: Municipality of Ferrara
- Operator: SPAL
- Capacity: 16,134
- Surface: Grass
- Record attendance: 25,420
- Field size: 105 m × 68 m (115 yd × 74 yd)

Construction
- Groundbreaking: 1927
- Opened: 1928
- Renovated: 1951, 1966, 1979, 1988, 2016–2018
- Architect: Carlo Savonuzzi

Tenants
- SPAL (1928–present); AC Giacomense (2008–2009); Venezia FC (2021)

Stadio Paolo Mazza (formerly Stadio Comunale) is a multi-use stadium in Ferrara, Italy. It is currently used mostly for football matches and is the home ground of SPAL.

Located in the Rione Giardino, west of Ferrara within the city walls, it was built in the immediate vicinity of the area where the former playground of SPAL, Campo di Piazza d'Armi, stood since 1919. The municipal stadium of Ferrara is the fifth oldest Italian ground still in operation.

It was opened in September 1928 as Stadio Comunale; initially, it had a capacity of 4,000. It assumed its current name in February 1982 to honor the former president of the club Paolo Mazza, who died two months earlier.

In concomitance with the access of SPAL to Serie A, in 1951 it was subjected to a heavy restructuring that brought capacity to 25,000. Between 1960s and 1980s it was renovated again, stabilizing the number of possible spectators to 22,000 until mid-2000s.

From 2005 to 2016, capacity was limited to 7,500 due to safety reasons and cost containment. In 2016–17, in conjunction with the club's promotion to Serie B and then Serie A, the stadium was restructured again to match the modern needs of comfort and safety. In summer 2018, further remodeling took place to bring capacity from 13,135 to 16,134 seats.
