= Federico Zanchetta =

Italian footballer

Personal information
- Date of birth: 23 March 2002 (age 24)
- Place of birth: Biella, Italy
- Height: 1.71 m (5 ft 7 in)
- Position: Midfielder

Team information
- Current team: Olbia
- Number: 15

Youth career
- 2013–2019: Juventus
- 2019–2020: SPAL

Senior career*
Years	Team	Apps	(Gls)
2020–2023	SPAL	0	(0)
2021–2022	→ Lucchese (loan)	1	(0)
2022–2023	→ Olbia (loan)	18	(0)
2023–	Olbia	12	(0)

International career^{‡}
2018	Italy U16	3	(0)
- * Club domestic league appearances and goals as of 4 May 2024 ‡ National team caps and goals as of 24 April 2018

Federico Zanchetta (born 23 March 2002) is an Italian footballer who plays as a midfielder for Serie D club Olbia.

== Club career ==
Zanchetta joined the youth academy of SPAL in 2019, after 6 years at Juventus. Zanchetta made his professional debut in a 3-0 Coppa Italia loss to AC Milan on 15 January 2020.

On 17 August 2021, he joined Lucchese on loan.

On 11 July 2022, Zanchetta was loaned by Olbia. On 15 July 2023, Zanchetta returned to Olbia on a permanent basis and signed a three-year contract.

== International career ==
In 2018, Zanchetta played three friendly matches for Italy U16.

== Personal life ==
Zanchetta is the son of the retired footballer Andrea Zanchetta.
