= 2020–21 Coppa Italia =

Tournament details
- Country: Italy
- Dates: 22 September 2020 – 19 May 2021
- Teams: 78

Final positions
- Champions: Juventus (14th title)
- Runners-up: Atalanta

Tournament statistics
- Matches played: 79
- Goals scored: 233 (2.95 per match)
- Top goal scorer(s): Gianluca Scamacca (4 goals)

The 2020–21 Coppa Italia (branded as the TIMVISION Cup for sponsorship reasons during the final) was the 74th edition of the national domestic Italian football tournament.

Napoli were the defending champions, but were defeated by Atalanta in the semi-finals.

Juventus won a record-extending fourteenth cup title, defeating Atalanta 2–1 in the final.

This season is the last using the 78-teams format. From the next season, the format would be with 44 teams.

== Participating teams ==
=== Serie A ===
- Juventus (round of 16)
- Internazionale (round of 16)
- Atalanta (round of 16)
- Lazio (round of 16)
- Roma (round of 16)
- Milan (round of 16)
- Napoli (round of 16)
- Sassuolo (round of 16)
- Hellas Verona
- Fiorentina
- Parma
- Bologna
- Udinese
- Cagliari
- Sampdoria
- Torino
- Genoa
- Benevento
- Crotone
- Spezia

=== Serie B ===
- Brescia
- SPAL
- Monza
- Vicenza
- Reggina
- Reggiana
- Cremonese
- Virtus Entella
- Ascoli
- Cosenza
- Pisa
- Pescara
- Salernitana
- Venezia
- Lecce
- Empoli
- Frosinone
- Cittadella
- Chievo
- Pordenone

=== Serie C ===
==== Group A ====
- Carrarese
- Renate
- Pontedera
- Alessandria
- Novara
- Albinoleffe
- Arezzo
- Pro Patria
- Livorno

==== Group B ====
- Padova
- Feralpisalò
- Modena
- Piacenza
- Triestina
- Südtirol
- Carpi
- Sambenedettese
- Perugia

==== Group C ====
- Bari
- Virtus Francavilla
- Teramo
- Catanzaro
- Catania
- Ternana
- Potenza
- Monopoli
- Avellino
- Trapani
- Juve Stabia

=== Serie D ===
- Tritium
- Ambrosiana
- Breno
- San Nicolò Notaresco
- Pineto
- Trastevere
- Latte Dolce
- Casarano
- Gelbison

== Format and seeding ==
Teams entered the competition at various stages, as follows:

- First phase (one-legged fixtures)
  - First round: 27 teams from Serie C and the nine Serie D teams started the tournament
  - Second round: the 18 winners from the previous round were joined by the 20 Serie B teams and 2 teams from Serie C
  - Third round: the 20 winners from the second round met the 12 Serie A sides, seeded 9–20
  - Fourth round: the 16 winners faced each other
- Second phase
  - Round of 16 (one-legged): the 8 fourth round winners were inserted into a bracket with the Serie A clubs, seeded 1–8
  - Quarter-finals (one-legged)
  - Semi-finals (two-legged)
- Final (one-legged)

== Round dates ==
The schedule of each round was the following.

Phase	Round	First leg	Second leg
First stage	First round	22–23 September 2020	
First stage	Second round	29–30 September 2020	
First stage	Third round	27–28 October 2020	
First stage	Fourth round	24–26 November 2020	
Final stage	Round of 16	12–21 January 2021	
Final stage	Quarter-finals	26–28 January 2021	
Final stage	Semi-finals	2–3 February 2021	9–10 February 2021
Final stage	Final	19 May 2021	

== First stage ==
=== First round ===
A total of 36 teams from Serie C and Serie D competed in this round, eighteen of which advanced to the second round.

22 September 2020	Südtirol (3)	2–1	Latte Dolce (4)	Salò
14:30 CEST (UTC+2)	Rover 29'; Polák 34'	Report	Bianchi 90+3'	Stadium: Stadio Lino Turina; Attendance: 0 Referee: Giacomo Camplone

22 September 2020	Ternana (3)	1–2	AlbinoLeffe (3)	Terni
20:30 CEST (UTC+2)	Partipilo 50'	Report	Cori 40'; Canestrelli 44'	Stadium: Stadio Libero Liberati; Attendance: 0 Referee: Francesco Fourneau

23 September 2020	Piacenza (3)	1–2	Teramo (3)	Piacenza
15:30 CEST (UTC+2)	Bruzzone 22'	Report	Santoro 5'; Pinzauti 23'	Stadium: Stadio Leonardo Garilli; Attendance: 0 Referee: Antonio Rapuano

23 September 2020	Carpi (3)	1–3 (a.e.t.)	Casarano (4)	Carpi
16:00 CEST (UTC+2)	Giovannini 74'	Report	Rodríguez 5', 105'; Sansone 100'	Stadium: Stadio Sandro Cabassi; Attendance: 0 Referee: Alessandro Prontera

23 September 2020	Alessandria (3)	3–2	Sambenedettese (3)	Alessandria
16:30 CEST (UTC+2)	Eusepi 13', 17'; Arrighini 90' (pen.)	Report	Nocciolini 25'; Panaioli 90+4'	Stadium: Stadio Giuseppe Moccagatta; Attendance: 0 Referee: Lorenzo Maggioni

23 September 2020	Novara (3)	3–1	Gelbison (4)	Novara
16:30 CEST (UTC+2)	Schiavi 21', 39' (pen.); Buzzegoli 48'	Report	Coulibaly 7'	Stadium: Stadio Silvio Piola; Attendance: 0 Referee: Simone Sozza

23 September 2020	Carrarese (3)	4–0	Ambrosiana (4)	Carrara
17:00 CEST (UTC+2)	Infantino 2'; Schirò 7'; Rota 9'; Caccavallo 86'	Report		Stadium: Stadio dei Marmi; Attendance: 0 Referee: Manuel Volpi

23 September 2020	Catanzaro (3)	2–1	Virtus Francavilla (3)	Catanzaro
17:00 CEST (UTC+2)	Casoli 35'; Carlini 45' (pen.)	Report	Franco 32'	Stadium: Stadio Nicola Ceravolo; Attendance: 0 Referee: Valerio Marini

23 September 2020	Livorno (3)	1–2	Pro Patria (3)	Livorno
17:00 CEST (UTC+2)	Gonnelli 81'	Report	Parker 17'; Latte Lath 49'	Stadium: Stadio Armando Picchi; Attendance: 0 Referee: Francesco Meraviglia

23 September 2020	Pontedera (3)	1–2	Arezzo (3)	Piancastagnaio
17:00 CEST (UTC+2)	Piana 67'	Report	Belloni 52'; Cutolo 90+4'	Stadium: Stadio Comunale; Attendance: 0 Referee: Daniele Paterna

23 September 2020	Bari (3)	4–0	Trastevere (4)	Bari
17:30 CEST (UTC+2)	D'Ursi 15'; Marras 23'; Antenucci 36'; Candellone 75'	Report		Stadium: Stadio San Nicola; Attendance: 0 Referee: Luca Massimi

23 September 2020	Juve Stabia (3)	2–1	Tritium (4)	Castellammare di Stabia
18:00 CEST (UTC+2)	Aldè 45' (o.g.); Mastalli 87'	Report	Marzeglia 81'	Stadium: Stadio Romeo Menti; Attendance: 0 Referee: Matteo Marchetti

23 September 2020	Renate (3)	2–1	Avellino (3)	Meda
18:00 CEST (UTC+2)	Giovinco 10'; Galuppini 74'	Report	Burgio 83'	Stadium: Stadio Città di Meda; Attendance: 0 Referee: Matteo Gariglio

23 September 2020	Feralpisalò (3)	1–0	Pineto (4)	Salò
18:30 CEST (UTC+2)	Ceccarelli 36'	Report		Stadium: Stadio Lino Turina; Attendance: 0 Referee: Daniel Amabile

23 September 2020	Potenza (3)	0–2	Triestina (3)	Potenza
18:30 CEST (UTC+2)		Report	Maracchi 19'; Di Massimo 28'	Stadium: Stadio Alfredo Viviani; Attendance: 212; Referee: Lorenzo Illuzzi

23 September 2020	Padova (3)	2–0	Breno (4)	Padua
19:00 CEST (UTC+2)	Santini 13'; Ronaldo 74'	Report		Stadium: Stadio Euganeo; Attendance: 0 Referee: Federico Dionisi

23 September 2020	Monopoli (3)	1–0	Modena (3)	Monopoli
20:00 CEST (UTC+2)	Paolucci 77'	Report		Stadium: Stadio Vito Simone Veneziani; Attendance: 0 Referee: Ivano Pezzuto

23 September 2020	Catania (3)	1–2 (a.e.t.)	San Nicolò Notaresco (4)	Catania
20:45 CEST (UTC+2)	Biondi 27'	Report	Speranza 56'; Cancelli 99'	Stadium: Stadio Angelo Massimino; Attendance: 0 Referee: Alberto Santoro

=== Second round ===
A total of forty teams (eighteen winners from the first round, two from Serie C, and all twenty from Serie B) competed in the second round, twenty of which advanced to the third round.

29 September 2020	Monza (2)	3–0	Triestina (3)	Monza
20:45 CEST (UTC+2)	Barillà 23'; Offredi 77' (o.g.); Machín 90' (pen.)	Report		Stadium: Stadio Brianteo; Attendance: 439; Referee: Marco Serra

30 September 2020	Reggina (2)	1–0	Teramo (3)	Reggio Calabria
14:00 CEST (UTC+2)	Di Chiara 34'	Report		Stadium: Stadio Oreste Granillo; Referee: Antonio Santoro

30 September 2020	Cittadella (2)	3–1	Novara (3)	Cittadella
15:00 CEST (UTC+2)	Iori 16' (pen.); Rosafio 74'; Ogunseye 79'	Report	Panico 76'	Stadium: Stadio Pier Cesare Tombolato; Referee: Eugenio Abbattista

30 September 2020	Cosenza (2)	0–0 (a.e.t.) (3–1 p)	Alessandria (3)	Cosenza
15:00 CEST (UTC+2)		Report		Stadium: Stadio San Vito-Gigi Marulla; Referee: Ivano Pezzuto
	Penalties
	Carretta (penalty scored); Idda (penalty scored); Kone (penalty scored)		(penalty missed) Casarini; (penalty missed) Arrighini; (penalty scored) Castellano; (penalty missed) Di Quinzio

30 September 2020	Cremonese (2)	4–0	Arezzo (3)	Cremona
15:00 CEST (UTC+2)	Ceravolo 61'; Fiordaliso 81'; Gaetano 90+1', 90+2'	Report		Stadium: Stadio Giovanni Zini; Attendance: 0 Referee: Gianluca Manganiello

30 September 2020	Frosinone (2)	1–3	Padova (3)	Frosinone
15:00 CEST (UTC+2)	Tabanelli 20'	Report	Della Latta 21', 44'; Soleri 34'	Stadium: Stadio Benito Stirpe; Referee: Giacomo Camplone

30 September 2020	Pisa (2)	2–0	Juve Stabia (3)	Pisa
15:00 CEST (UTC+2)	Sibilli 7', 50' (pen.)	Report		Stadium: Arena Garibaldi – Stadio Romeo Anconetani; Referee: Valerio Marini

30 September 2020	Pescara (2)	1–1 (a.e.t.) (8–7 p)	San Nicolò Notaresco (4)	Pescara
15:30 CEST (UTC+2)	Riccardi 25'	Report	Banegas 34'	Stadium: Stadio Adriatico – Giovanni Cornacchia; Referee: Antonio Di Martino
	Penalties
	Maistro (penalty scored); Memushaj (penalty scored); Capone (penalty missed); Ceter (penalty scored); Galano (penalty scored); Bellanova (penalty scored); Ventola (penalty scored); Omeonga (penalty missed); Jaroszyński (penalty scored); Scognamiglio (penalty scored)		(penalty scored) Frulla; (penalty scored) Cesario; (penalty missed) Cancelli; (penalty scored) Bianciardi; (penalty scored) Banegas; (penalty scored) Colombatti; (penalty scored) Lattarulo; (penalty missed) Blando; (penalty scored) Gallo; (penalty missed) Sorrini

30 September 2020	Virtus Entella (2)	2–1	AlbinoLeffe (3)	Chiavari
16:00 CEST (UTC+2)	Koutsoupias 30'; Petrovic 38'	Report	Gușu 90+2'	Stadium: Stadio Comunale; Referee: Matteo Gariglio

30 September 2020	Ascoli (2)	1–4	Perugia (3)	Ascoli Piceno
17:00 CEST (UTC+2)	Ghazoini 89'	Report	Rosi 12'; Murano 24'; Dragomir 42'; Lunghi 46'	Stadium: Stadio Cino e Lillo Del Duca; Referee: Luca Massimi

30 September 2020	Empoli (2)	2–1	Renate (3)	Empoli
17:00 CEST (UTC+2)	Merola 17', 79'	Report	Galuppini 89'	Stadium: Stadio Carlo Castellani; Attendance: 0 Referee: Matteo Marchetti

30 September 2020	Vicenza (2)	3–2 (a.e.t.)	Pro Patria (3)	Vicenza
17:00 CEST (UTC+2)	Giacomelli 45+1'; Marotta 92' (pen.); Vandeputte 108'	Report	Parker 32'; Latte Lath 113'	Stadium: Stadio Romeo Menti; Referee: Giovanni Ayroldi

30 September 2020	Chievo (2)	1–1 (a.e.t.) (6–7 p)	Catanzaro (3)	Verona
18:00 CEST (UTC+2)	De Luca 41'	Report	Martinelli 59'	Stadium: Stadio Marcantonio Bentegodi; Referee: Francesco Meraviglia
	Penalties
	Palmiero (penalty missed); De Luca (penalty scored); Morsay (penalty scored); Grubac (penalty scored); Mogoș (penalty scored); Rigione (penalty scored); Zuelli (penalty scored); Illanes (penalty missed)		(penalty scored) Carlini; (penalty scored) Curiale; (penalty missed) Bayeye; (penalty scored) Martinelli; (penalty scored) Pinna; (penalty scored) Garufo; (penalty scored) Casoli; (penalty scored) Verna

30 September 2020	Lecce (2)	2–0	Feralpisalò (3)	Lecce
18:00 CEST (UTC+2)	Henderson 69'; Dubickas 88'	Report		Stadium: Stadio Via del Mare; Referee: Ivan Robilotta

30 September 2020	Pordenone (2)	3–0	Casarano (4)	Trieste
18:00 CEST (UTC+2)	Rossetti 20'; Butic 35' (pen.); Secli 76'	Report		Stadium: Stadio Nereo Rocco; Referee: Daniel Amabile

30 September 2020	Reggiana (2)	0–3 (4–3 p)	Monopoli (3)	Reggio Emilia
18:00 CEST (UTC+2)	Marchi 85' (pen.), 112' (pen.)	Report	Starita 60'; Montero 107' (pen.)	Stadium: Mapei Stadium – Città del Tricolore; Referee: Antonio Rapuano
	Penalties
	Espeche (penalty scored); Gyamfi (penalty scored); Marchi (penalty missed); Pezzella (penalty scored); Radrezza (penalty scored)		(penalty scored) Mercadante; (penalty scored) Santoro; (penalty scored) Montero; (penalty missed) Zambataro; (penalty missed) Paolucci
Note: Monopoli were awarded a 3–0 win due to Reggiana fielding an ineligible player. Match originally ended 2–2 after extra time with Reggiana winning 4–3 on penalties.

30 September 2020	Salernitana (2)	3–0	Südtirol (3)	Salerno
18:00 CEST (UTC+2)	Tutino 53'; Cicerelli 60'; Capezzi 88'	Report		Stadium: Stadio Arechi; Referee: Daniele Paterna

30 September 2020	Venezia (2)	2–0	Carrarese (3)	Venice
18:00 CEST (UTC+2)	Johnsen 65', 90'	Report		Stadium: Stadio Pier Luigi Penzo; Attendance: 0 Referee: Riccardo Ros

30 September 2020	Brescia (2)	3–0	Trapani (3)	Brescia
20:00 CEST (UTC+2)		Report		Stadium: Stadio Mario Rigamonti; Referee: Lorenzo Illuzzi
Note: Trapani withdrew from the match.

30 September 2020	SPAL (2)	0–0 (a.e.t.) (4–2 p)	Bari (3)	Ferrara
21:00 CEST (UTC+2)		Report		Stadium: Stadio Paolo Mazza; Referee: Simone Sozza
	Penalties
	Sa. Esposito (penalty scored); Janković (penalty scored); Floccari (penalty missed); Se. Esposito (penalty scored); Tomović (penalty scored)		(penalty scored) Antenucci; (penalty scored) Marras; (penalty missed) Candellone; (penalty missed) Minelli

=== Third round ===
A total of 32 teams (twenty winners from the second round and twelve Serie A clubs seeded 9–20) competed in the third round, sixteen of which advanced to the fourth round.

27 October 2020	Sampdoria (1)	1–0	Salernitana (2)	Genoa
14:00 CET (UTC+1)	La Gumina 54'	Report		Stadium: Stadio Luigi Ferraris; Referee: Alessandro Prontera

27 October 2020	Bologna (1)	2–0	Reggina (2)	Bologna
15:00 CET (UTC+1)	Vignato 70'; Orsolini 72'	Report		Stadium: Stadio Renato Dall'Ara; Referee: Gianluca Manganiello

27 October 2020	Virtus Entella (2)	3–1	Pisa (2)	Chiavari
15:00 CET (UTC+1)	Mancosu 36' (pen.); Sandri 69'; Cardoselli 79'	Report	Palombi 51'	Stadium: Stadio Comunale; Referee: Luca Massimi

27 October 2020	Pordenone (2)	0–0 (a.e.t.) (1–4 p)	Monza (2)	Trieste
18:00 CET (UTC+1)		Report		Stadium: Stadio Nereo Rocco; Attendance: 0 Referee: Daniel Amabile
	Penalties
	Stefani (penalty missed); Camporese (penalty missed); Scavone (penalty scored)		(penalty scored) D'Errico; (penalty scored) Frattesi; (penalty scored) Bellusci; (penalty scored) Barillà

28 October 2020	Cagliari (1)	1–0	Cremonese (2)	Cagliari
15:00 CET (UTC+1)	Faragò 69'	Report		Stadium: Sardegna Arena; Referee: Antonio Giua

28 October 2020	Hellas Verona (1)	3–3 (a.e.t.) (3–1 p)	Venezia (2)	Verona
17:00 CET (UTC+1)	Ilić 41'; Salcedo 59'; Vieira 110'	Report	Johnsen 84'; Capello 87'; Modulo 98'	Stadium: Stadio Marcantonio Bentegodi; Referee: Giacomo Camplone
	Penalties
	Lazović (penalty scored); Barák (penalty scored); Colley (penalty scored)		(penalty missed) Modolo; (penalty missed) Johnsen; (penalty scored) Fiordilino; (penalty missed) Capello

28 October 2020	Parma (1)	3–1	Pescara (2)	Parma
18:00 CET (UTC+1)	Karamoh 26', 43'; Adorante 70'	Report	Nzita 90+1'	Stadium: Stadio Ennio Tardini; Referee: Simone Sozza

28 October 2020	Cosenza (2)	2–1	Monopoli (3)	Cosenza
15:00 CET (UTC+1)	Petrucci 15'; Kone 84'	Report	Idda 69' (o.g.)	Stadium: Stadio San Vito; Referee: Maria Marotta

28 October 2020	Benevento (1)	2–4	Empoli (2)	Benevento
16:00 CET (UTC+1)	Maggio 57'; Moncini 90+1'	Report	Olivieri 47'; Mancosu 60', 66', 85'	Stadium: Stadio Ciro Vigorito; Referee: Ivano Pezzuto

28 October 2020	Brescia (2)	3–0	Perugia (3)	Brescia
16:00 CET (UTC+1)	Bisoli 10'; Ayé 25' (pen.); Mangraviti 71'	Report		Stadium: Stadio Mario Rigamonti; Referee: Ivan Robilotta

28 October 2020	Cittadella (2)	0–2	Spezia (1)	Cesena
16:00 CET (UTC+1)		Report	Verde 49'; Benedetti 63' (o.g.)	Stadium: Stadio Dino Manuzzi; Referee: Marco Serra
Note: Tie reversed form the original draw.

28 October 2020	Udinese (1)	3–1	Vicenza (2)	Udine
18:00 CET (UTC+1)	Forestieri 21'; Deulofeu 60'; Pussetto 64'	Report	Gori 88'	Stadium: Dacia Arena; Referee: Antonio Rapuano

28 October 2020	Fiorentina (1)	2–1	Padova (3)	Florence
18:00 CET (UTC+1)	Venuti 10'; Callejón 32'	Report	Santini 55'	Stadium: Stadio Artemio Franchi; Referee: Alberto Santoro

28 October 2020	Torino (1)	3–1 (a.e.t.)	Lecce (2)	Turin
14:00 CET (UTC+1)	Lyanco 39'; Verdi 109' (pen.), 112'	Report	Stępiński 22'	Stadium: Stadio Olimpico Grande Torino; Referee: Marco Piccinini

28 October 2020	Crotone (1)	1–1 (a.e.t.) (3–4 p)	SPAL (2)	Crotone
17:00 CET (UTC+1)	Cigarini 107' (pen.)	Report	Seck 113'	Stadium: Stadio Ezio Scida; Referee: Matteo Marchetti
	Penalties
	Siligardi (penalty scored); Crociata (penalty missed); Molina (penalty scored); Golemić (penalty scored); Cigarini (penalty missed)		(penalty scored) Sa. Esposito; (penalty scored) Missiroli; (penalty missed) Sala; (penalty scored) Se. Esposito; (penalty scored) Ranieri

28 October 2020	Genoa (1)	2–1	Catanzaro (3)	Genoa
18:00 CET (UTC+1)	Scamacca 7', 64'	Report	Fazio 83'	Stadium: Stadio Luigi Ferraris; Referee: Lorenzo Maggioni

=== Fourth round ===
The sixteen winners from the third round competed in the fourth round, eight of which advanced to the round of 16.

24 November 2020	SPAL (2)	2–0	Monza (2)	Ferrara
14:30 CET (UTC+1)	Paloschi 62' (pen.); Brignola 75'	Report		Stadium: Stadio Paolo Mazza; Referee: Marco Piccinini

25 November 2020	Parma (1)	2–1	Cosenza (2)	Parma
14:30 CET (UTC+1)	Brunetta 13', 39'	Report	Corsi 38'	Stadium: Stadio Ennio Tardini; Referee: Giacomo Camplone

25 November 2020	Empoli (2)	3–0	Brescia (2)	Empoli
14:30 CET (UTC+1)		Report		Stadium: Stadio Carlo Castellani; Referee: Nicola Ayroldi
Note: Brescia withdrew from the match to prevent an outbreak after several of their players tested positive for COVID-19.

25 November 2020	Cagliari (1)	2–1	Hellas Verona (1)	Cagliari
17:30 CET (UTC+1)	Cerri 30'; Sottil 90+3'	Report	Colley 74'	Stadium: Sardegna Arena; Referee: Alessandro Prontera

25 November 2020	Bologna (1)	2–4 (a.e.t.)	Spezia (1)	Bologna
17:30 CET (UTC+1)	Barrow 13'; Orsolini 45+1'	Report	Piccoli 5'; Farias 64'; Maggiore 100', 119'	Stadium: Stadio Renato dall'Ara; Referee: Manuel Volpi
Note: Tie reversed from the original draw.

25 November 2020	Udinese (1)	0–1 (a.e.t.)	Fiorentina (1)	Udine
17:30 CET (UTC+1)		Report	Montiel 112'	Stadium: Dacia Arena; Referee: Marco Serra

26 November 2020	Torino (1)	2–0	Virtus Entella (2)	Turin
14:00 CET (UTC+1)	Zaza 28'; Bonazzoli 30'	Report		Stadium: Stadio Olimpico Grande Torino; Referee: Daniele Paterna

26 November 2020	Sampdoria (1)	1–3	Genoa (1)	Genoa
17:00 CET (UTC+1)	Verre 18'	Report	Scamacca 60', 72'; Lerager 68'	Stadium: Stadio Luigi Ferraris; Referee: Francesco Fourneau

== Final stage ==
=== Bracket ===
Round of 16
Atalanta	3
Cagliari	1
Lazio	2
Parma	1
Napoli	3
Empoli	2
Roma	0
Spezia	3
Fiorentina	1
Internazionale (a.e.t.)	2
Milan (p)	0 (5)
Torino	0 (4)
Juventus (a.e.t.)	3
Genoa	2
Sassuolo	0
SPAL	2

Quarter-finals
Atalanta	3
Lazio	2
Napoli	4
Spezia	2
Internazionale	2
Milan	1
Juventus	4
SPAL	0

Semi-finals
Atalanta	0	3	3
Napoli	0	1	1
Internazionale	1	0	1
Juventus	2	0	2

Final
Atalanta	1
Juventus	2

=== Round of 16 ===
The round of 16 matches were played between the eight winners from the fourth round and clubs seeded 1–8 in 2019–20 Serie A, and held from 12 to 21 January. A draw (held on 27 November) determined the home and away teams in matches involving two Serie A sides.

12 January 2021	Milan (1)	0–0 (a.e.t.) (5–4 p)	Torino (1)	Milan
20:45 CET (UTC+1)		Report		Stadium: San Siro; Referee: Paolo Valeri
	Penalties
	Kessié (penalty scored); Hernandez (penalty scored); Tonali (penalty scored); Romagnoli (penalty scored); Çalhanoğlu (penalty scored)		(penalty scored) Belotti; (penalty scored) Lukić; (penalty scored) Lyanco; (penalty missed) Rincón; (penalty scored) Milinković-Savić

13 January 2021	Fiorentina (1)	1–2 (a.e.t.)	Internazionale (1)	Florence
15:00 CET (UTC+1)	Kouamé 57'	Report	Vidal 40' (pen.); Lukaku 119'	Stadium: Stadio Artemio Franchi; Referee: Davide Massa

13 January 2021	Napoli (1)	3–2	Empoli (2)	Naples
17:45 CET (UTC+1)	Di Lorenzo 18'; Lozano 38'; Petagna 77'	Report	Bajrami 33', 68'	Stadium: Stadio San Paolo; Referee: Antonio Giua

13 January 2021	Juventus (1)	3–2 (a.e.t.)	Genoa (1)	Turin
20:45 CET (UTC+1)	Kulusevski 2'; Morata 23'; Rafia 104'	Report	Czyborra 28'; Melegoni 74'	Stadium: Juventus Stadium; Referee: Daniele Chiffi

14 January 2021	Sassuolo (1)	0–2	SPAL (2)	Reggio Emilia
17:30 CET (UTC+1)		Report	Missiroli 49'; Dickmann 58'	Stadium: Mapei Stadium – Città del Tricolore; Referee: Giacomo Camplone

14 January 2021	Atalanta (1)	3–1	Cagliari (1)	Bergamo
21:15 CET (UTC+1)	Miranchuk 43'; Muriel 61'; Šutalo 64'	Report	Sottil 55'	Stadium: Gewiss Stadium; Referee: Federico Dionisi

19 January 2021	Roma (1)	0–3	Spezia (1)	Rome
21:15 CET (UTC+1)	Pellegrini 43' (pen.); Mkhitaryan 73'	Report	Galabinov 6' (pen.); Saponara 15', 119'; Verde 107'	Stadium: Stadio Olimpico; Referee: Davide Ghersini
Note: Match awarded 3–0 to Spezia, due to Roma making six substitutions instead of the maximum five allowed. Spezia had originally won 4–2 after extra time.

21 January 2021	Lazio (1)	2–1	Parma (1)	Rome
21:15 CET (UTC+1)	Parolo 23'; Colombi 90' (o.g.)	Report	Mihăilă 83'	Stadium: Stadio Olimpico; Referee: Giovanni Ayroldi

=== Quarter-finals ===
The quarter-final matches were played between clubs advancing from the round of 16, and held from 26 to 28 January. A draw (held on 27 November) determined the home and away teams in matches involving two Serie A sides.

26 January 2021	Internazionale (1)	2–1	Milan (1)	Milan
20:45 CET (UTC+1)	Lukaku 71' (pen.); Eriksen 90+7'	Report	Ibrahimović 31'	Stadium: San Siro; Referee: Paolo Valeri

27 January 2021	Atalanta (1)	3–2	Lazio (1)	Bergamo
17:45 CET (UTC+1)	Djimsiti 7'; Malinovskyi 37'; Miranchuk 57'	Report	Muriqi 17'; Acerbi 34'	Stadium: Gewiss Stadium; Referee: Luca Pairetto

27 January 2021	Juventus (1)	4–0	SPAL (2)	Turin
20:45 CET (UTC+1)	Morata 16' (pen.); Frabotta 33'; Kulusevski 78'; Chiesa 90+4'	Report		Stadium: Juventus Stadium; Referee: Ivano Pezzuto

28 January 2021	Napoli (1)	4–2	Spezia (1)	Naples
21:00 CET (UTC+1)	Koulibaly 5'; Lozano 20'; Politano 30'; Elmas 40'	Report	Gyasi 70'; Acampora 73'	Stadium: Stadio San Paolo; Referee: Francesco Fourneau

=== Semi-finals ===
The semi-finals (a two-legged round) were played between clubs advancing from the quarter-finals, and held from 2 to 10 February 2021.

==== First leg ====
2 February 2021	Internazionale (1)	1–2	Juventus (1)	Milan
20:45 CET (UTC+1)	Martínez 9'	Report	Ronaldo 26' (pen.), 35'	Stadium: San Siro; Referee: Gianpaolo Calvarese

3 February 2021	Napoli (1)	0–0	Atalanta (1)	Naples
20:45 CET (UTC+1)		Report		Stadium: Stadio San Paolo; Referee: Michael Fabbri

==== Second leg ====
9 February 2021	Juventus (1)	0–0 (2–1 agg.)	Internazionale (1)	Turin
20:45 CET (UTC+1)		Report		Stadium: Juventus Stadium; Referee: Maurizio Mariani

10 February 2021	Atalanta (1)	3–1 (3–1 agg.)	Napoli (1)	Bergamo
20:45 CET (UTC+1)	Zapata 10'; Pessina 16', 78'	Report	Lozano 53'	Stadium: Gewiss Stadium; Referee: Federico La Penna

=== Final ===
19 May 2021
21:00 CEST

Atalanta	1–2	Juventus
Malinovskyi 41'	Report	Kulusevski 31'; Chiesa 73'

Mapei Stadium – Città del Tricolore, Reggio Emilia
Attendance: 4,300 (Note: The total capacity of the stadium was established at 20% due to the COVID-19 pandemic in Italy.)
Referee: Davide Massa

== Top goalscorers ==
Rank	Player	Club	Goals
1	(Italy) Gianluca Scamacca	Genoa	4
2	(Norway) Dennis Johnsen	Venezia	3
2	(Sweden) Dejan Kulusevski	Juventus	3
2	(Mexico) Hirving Lozano	Napoli	3
2	(Italy) Leonardo Mancuso	Empoli	3
6	28 players		2
