= 2021–22 Pordenone Calcio season =

Pordenone
2021–22 season
- Chairman: Mauro Lovisa
- Manager: Massimo Paci (until 30 August); Massimo Rastelli (from 31 August to 16 October); Bruno Tedino (from 18 October)
- Stadium: Stadio Guido Teghil
- Serie B: 20th (relegated)
- Coppa Italia: Round of 64
- Top goalscorer: League: Nicolò Cambiaghi (7); All: Nicolò Cambiaghi (7)
- Biggest win: Pordenone 2–0 Alessandria

The 2021–22 season was Pordenone Calcio's third consecutive season in second division of the Italian football league, the Serie B, and the 102nd as a football club.

== Players ==
=== First-team squad ===
Note: Flags indicate national team as defined under FIFA eligibility rules; some limited exceptions apply. Players may hold more than one non-FIFA nationality.

No.	Pos.	Nation	Player
1	GK	ITA	Giacomo Bindi
2	DF	MAR	Hamza El Kaouakibi
3	DF	ITA	Alessio Sabbione
4	DF	ITA	Mirko Stefani (Captain)
5	MF	ITA	Alessandro Lovisa (on loan from Fiorentina)
6	DF	ITA	Alberto Barison
7	FW	GHA	Davis Mensah
10	MF	ITA	Francesco Deli (on loan from Cremonese)
11	FW	ITA	Jacopo Pellegrini (on loan from Sassuolo)
12	GK	ITA	Gaetano Fasolino
15	MF	ROU	Mihael Onișa
16	DF	ITA	Armando Anastasio (on loan from Monza)
18	MF	ITA	Simone Pasa
19	FW	ITA	Federico Secli
22	GK	ITA	Samuele Perisan

No.	Pos.	Nation	Player
23	MF	ITA	Emanuele Torrasi
24	DF	ITA	Federico Valietti (on loan from Genoa)
26	DF	ITA	Alessandro Bassoli
27	FW	ITA	Leonardo Candellone (on loan from Napoli)
28	FW	ITA	Nicolò Cambiaghi (on loan from Atalanta)
30	DF	ITA	Christian Dalle Mura (on loan from Fiorentina)
32	FW	CRO	Karlo Butić
33	MF	ITA	Roberto Zammarini
36	MF	SLO	Dejan Vokić (on loan from Benevento)
38	FW	ITA	Giuseppe Di Serio (on loan from Benevento)
45	FW	SEN	Youssouph Cheikh Sylla
72	DF	ITA	Matteo Perri
79	MF	ITA	Davide Gavazzi
98	MF	ITA	Daniele Iacoponi (on loan from Parma)
99	DF	ITA	Cristian Andreoni (on loan from Bari)

=== Out on loan ===
Note: Flags indicate national team as defined under FIFA eligibility rules; some limited exceptions apply. Players may hold more than one non-FIFA nationality.

No.	Pos.	Nation	Player
—	DF	ITA	Michele Camporese (at Cosenza)
—	DF	POL	Adam Chrzanowski (at Wisla Plock)
—	MF	ITA	Kevin Biondi (at Catania)
—	MF	POL	Tomasz Kupisz (at Reggina)
—	MF	ITA	Luca Magnino (at Modena)

No.	Pos.	Nation	Player
—	MF	ITA	Gianvito Misuraca (at Bari)
—	FW	ITA	Aldo Banse (at Cjarlins Muzane)
—	FW	ITA	Amato Ciciretti (at Como)
—	FW	ITA	Simone Magnaghi (at Pontedera)

== Pre-season and friendlies ==
Win Draw Loss

25 July 2021 Friendly	Pordenone (Italy)	2–1	(Slovenia) Gorica	Tarvisio, Italy
17:00 CEST (UTC+2)				Stadium: Polisportivo Comunale di Tarvisio

31 July 2021 Friendly	Atalanta (Italy)	2–1	(Italy) Pordenone	Bergamo, Italy
17:00 CEST (UTC+2)	Piccoli 6'; Kovalenko 75'		Tsadjout 14' (pen.)	Stadium: Gewiss Stadium; Attendance: 1,000; Referee: Matteo Marcenaro

4 August 2021 Friendly	Padova (Italy)	2–2	(Italy) Pordenone	Padova, Italy
18:00 CEST (UTC+2)				Stadium: Stadio Euganeo

8 August 2021 Friendly	Pordenone (Italy)	2–4	(Italy) Bologna	Lignano Sabbiadoro, Italy
20:30 CEST (UTC+2)	Pellegrini 8'; Ciciretti 88'		De Silvestri 16'; Domínguez 37'; Vignato 49'; Santander 81'	Stadium: Stadio Guido Teghil; Attendance: 1,000; Referee: Marco Piccinini

== Competitions ==
=== Overall record ===
Competition	First match	Last match	Starting round	Final position	Record							
Competition	First match	Last match	Starting round	Final position	Pld	W	D	L	GF	GA	GD	Win %
Serie B	21 August 2021	6 May 2022	Matchday 1	20th	38	3	9	26	29	71	−42	7.89
Coppa Italia	13 August 2021		Round of 64	Round of 64	1	0	0	1	1	3	−2	0.00
Total					39	3	9	27	30	74	−44	7.69

Source: Soccerway

=== Serie B ===
==== League table ====
Pos	Team	Pld	W	D	L	GF	GA	GD	Pts	Promotion, qualification or relegation
16	Cosenza (O)	38	8	11	19	36	59	−23	35	Qualification for relegation play-out
17	Vicenza (R)	38	9	7	22	38	59	−21	34 (Note: Vicenza finished ahead of Alessandria on head-to-head points: Vicenza 2–1 Alessandria, Alessandria 0–1 Vicenza.)	Qualification for relegation play-out
18	Alessandria (R)	38	8	10	20	37	59	−22	34	Relegation to Serie C
19	Crotone (R)	38	4	14	20	41	61	−20	26	Relegation to Serie C
20	Pordenone (R)	38	3	9	26	29	71	−42	18	Relegation to Serie C

Source: Lega Serie B (in Italian), Soccerway (in English)
Rules for classification: 1) Points; 2) Head-to-head points; 3) Head-to-head goal difference; 4) Goal difference; 5) Goals scored; 6) Draw.
(O) Play-off winners; (R) Relegated

==== Results summary ====
Overall								Home						Away					
Pld	W	D	L	GF	GA	GD	Pts	W	D	L	GF	GA	GD	W	D	L	GF	GA	GD
38	3	9	26	29	71	−42	18	2	7	10	19	34	−15	1	2	16	10	37	−27

Source: Serie B

==== Results by round ====
Round	1	2	3	4	5	6	7	8	9	10	11	12	13	14	15	16	17	18	19	20	21	22	23	24	25	26	27	28	29	30	31	32	33	34	35	36	37	38
Ground	H	A	H	A	H	A	H	A	H	A	H	A	H	A	H	A	H	H	A	A	H	A	H	A	H	A	H	H	A	H	A	H	A	H	A	H	A	H
Result	L	L	L	L	D	L	L	L	D	L	D	L	L	D	W	L	D	L	L	W	D	L	L	L	L	L	L	L	D	L	D	L	W	L	L	L	D	L
Position	16	20	20	20	18	19	20	20	20	20	20	20	20	20	20	20	19	19	19	19	19	20	20	20	20	20	20	20	20	20	20	20	20	20	20	20	20	20

Source: Serie B
A = Away; H = Home; W = Win; D = Draw; L = Loss

==== Matches ====
The league fixtures were announced on 24 July 2021.

=== Coppa Italia ===
13 August 2021 Round of 64	Pordenone	1–3	Spezia	Lignano Sabbiadoro
17:45 CEST (UTC+2)	Pellegrini (yellow card) 13'; Folorunsho 51' (pen.); Kupisz (yellow card) 59'; Misuraca (yellow card) 82'	Report	Erlić 39'; Nikolaou 45+3'; Mráz (yellow card) 70'; Colley 83' (pen.)	Stadium: Stadio Guido Teghil; Attendance: 600; Referee: Davide Ghersini
