= 2022–23 Pordenone Calcio season =

Pordenone Calcio
2022–23 season
- Chairman: Mauro Lovisa
- Manager: Domenico Di Carlo; Mirko Stefani (from March)
- Stadium: Stadio Guido Teghil; Stadio Omero Topgnon
- Serie C: 3rd
- Coppa Italia Serie C: First round
- Top goalscorer: League: Leonardo Candellone (8); All: Leonardo Candellone (8)

The 2022–23 Pordenone Calcio season is the club's 103rd season in existence and its first season back in the third division of Italian football. In addition to the domestic league, Pordenone are participating in this season's edition of the Coppa Italia Serie C. The season covers the period from 1 July 2022 to 30 June 2023.

== Players ==
=== First-team squad ===
As of 31 January 2023

Note: Flags indicate national team as defined under FIFA eligibility rules; some limited exceptions apply. Players may hold more than one non-FIFA nationality.

No.	Pos.	Nation	Player
1	GK	ITA	Marco Festa
2	DF	ITA	Cristian Andreoni
3	DF	ITA	Matteo Bruscagin
5	MF	ITA	Daniele Giorico
7	FW	LTU	Edgaras Dubickas (on loan from Pisa)
8	MF	ITA	Salvatore Burrai
9	FW	ITA	Simone Magnaghi
10	MF	ITA	Francesco Deli
11	FW	ITA	Kevin Piscopo
14	FW	ITA	Simone Palombi (on loan from Alessandria)
15	MF	ALB	Arlind Ajeti
16	DF	ITA	Enrico Maset
17	DF	ITA	Alessandro La Rosa

No.	Pos.	Nation	Player
18	DF	ITA	Amedeo Benedetti
20	MF	ITA	Marco Pinato
21	MF	AUT	Robert Gucher
22	GK	ESP	Miguel Martínez
23	MF	ITA	Emanuele Torrasi
24	FW	ITA	Simone Edera
26	DF	ITA	Alessandro Bassoli
27	FW	ITA	Leonardo Candellone (on loan from Napoli)
29	DF	ITA	Gabriele Ingrosso
30	GK	ITA	Francesco Turchetto
31	DF	ITA	Roberto Pirrello
33	MF	ITA	Roberto Zammarini
34	DF	ITA	Stefano Negro

=== Out on loan ===
Note: Flags indicate national team as defined under FIFA eligibility rules; some limited exceptions apply. Players may hold more than one non-FIFA nationality.

No.	Pos.	Nation	Player
—	MF	ITA	Simone Baldassar (at Catania until 30 June 2023)
—	MF	ITA	Kevin Biondi (at Rimini until 30 June 2023)
—	MF	ROU	Mihael Onișa (at Piacenza until 30 June 2023)
—	FW	ITA	Gianvito Misuraca (at Fermana until 30 June 2023)

No.	Pos.	Nation	Player
—	FW	ITA	Gabriel Bianco (at Pro Sesto until 30 June 2023)
—	FW	ITA	Amato Ciciretti (at Ascoli until 30 June 2023, obligation to buy)
—	FW	CRO	Tomi Petrović (at Trento until 30 June 2023)
—	FW	SEN	Youssouph Cheikh Sylla (at Alessandria until 30 June 2023)

== Pre-season and friendlies ==
6 August 2022 Friendly	Dolomiti Bellunesi (Italy)	2–5	(Italy) Pordenone
18:00 CET (UTC+1)

7 August 2022 Friendly	Torviscosa (Italy)	2–5	(Italy) Pordenone	Feltre
18:00 CET (UTC+1)				Stadium: Stadio Zugni Tauro

== Competitions ==
=== Overview ===
Competition	First match	Last match	Starting round	Final position	Record							
Competition	First match	Last match	Starting round	Final position	Pld	W	D	L	GF	GA	GD	Win %
Serie C	4 September 2022	22 April 2023	Matchday 1	2nd	38	16	14	8	53	35	+18	42.11
Coppa Italia Serie C	5 October 2022		First round	First round	1	0	0	1	0	1	−1	0.00
Total					39	16	14	9	53	36	+17	41.03

Source: Soccerway

=== Serie C ===
==== League table ====
Pos	Team	Pld	W	D	L	GF	GA	GD	Pts	Qualification
1	Feralpisalò (C, P)	38	20	11	7	41	21	+20	71	Promotion to Serie B. Qualification for the Supercoppa di Serie C
2	Pordenone (E)	38	16	14	8	53	35	+18	62 (Note: Pordenone ahead of Lecco due to head-to-head matches: POR-LEC 5-0; LEC-POR 0-0)	Excluded
3	Lecco (O, P)	38	17	11	10	45	40	+5	62	Qualification for the promotion play-offs national phase
4	Pro Sesto	38	16	12	10	46	45	+1	60	Qualification for the promotion play-offs group phase (Note: Since Vicenza, the winners of the 2022-23 Coppa Italia Serie C, finished within the top 10 places in the group, Pergolettese, the 11-th placed team, qualifies for the group phase of the promotion play-offs.)
5	Padova	38	15	14	9	47	40	+7	59	Qualification for the promotion play-offs group phase

Updated to match(es) played on 16 April 2023. Source: Lega Pro, Soccerway (in English)
Rules for classification: 1) Points; 2) Head-to-head points; 3) Head-to-head goal difference; 4) Goal difference; 5) Goals scored; 6) Lower goals against; 7) Wins; 8) Lower losses; 9) Away wins; 10) Lower home losses.
(C) Champions; (E) Eliminated; (O) Play-off winners; (P) Promoted

==== Results summary ====
Overall								Home						Away					
Pld	W	D	L	GF	GA	GD	Pts	W	D	L	GF	GA	GD	W	D	L	GF	GA	GD
38	16	14	8	53	35	+18	62	9	7	3	27	15	+12	7	7	5	26	20	+6

Source: Soccerway

==== Results by round ====
Round	1
Ground	
Result	
Position	

A = Away; H = Home; W = Win; D = Draw; L = Loss

==== Matches ====
September 2022	Pordenone	–	Lignano Sabbiadoro
CET (UTC+1)			Stadium: Stadio Guido Teghil

=== Coppa Italia Serie C ===
5 October 2022 First round	Pordenone	0–1	Imolese	Lignano Sabbiadoro
15:30 CET (UTC+1)				Stadium: Stadio Guido Teghil
