= Banse =

Banse is a surname. Notable people with the surname include:

- Aldo Banse (born 2002), Italian football player
- Amy Banse (born 1959), American businesswoman
- Ewald Banse (1883–1953), German geographer
- Juliane Banse (born 1969), German opera singer
- Karl Banse (1929–2025), American oceanographer
- Orinoco Faamausili-Banse (born 1990), New Zealand swimmer
- Sacha Bansé (born 2001), Belgian-born Burkinabé footballer
- Wilhelm Banse (1911–1965), German politician

== See also ==
- Bansed, is a village in Parbatsar, India
