= Luca Scimia =

New Zealand footballer (born 1999)

Personal information
- Full name: Luca Daniel Scimia
- Date of birth: 5 January 1999 (age 27)
- Place of birth: Auckland, New Zealand
- Height: 1.85 m (6 ft 1 in)
- Position: Midfielder

Team information
- Current team: L'Aquila

Youth career
- 2011–2013: Nuova Tor Tre Teste
- 2013–2014: Siena
- 2014–2015: Roma
- 2015–2018: Pescara

Senior career*
Years	Team	Apps	(Gls)
2018–2020	Pescara	0	(0)
2018	→ Fano (loan)	6	(0)
2019–2020	→ Rende (loan)	19	(3)
2020–2021	Fano	26	(2)
2021–2022	Notaresco	18	(2)
2022	L'Aquila		
2022–2023	Notaresco	18	(1)
2023–2024	Sambenedettese	31	(1)
2024–2025	Atletico Ascoli	27	(2)
2025–2026	Giulianova	17	(1)
2026–	L'Aquila	5	(0)
- * Club domestic league appearances and goals as of 1 March 2026

Luca Daniel Scimia (born 5 January 1999) is a New Zealand professional footballer who plays as a midfielder for Serie D club L'Aquila.

== Career ==
Scimia is a youth academy graduate of Pescara. On 7 October 2018, he made his first team debut against Gubbio while on loan at Fano. He came on as a 76th minute substitute for Giordano Fioretti as the match ended in a goalless draw.

On 22 October 2021, Scimia joined Serie D club Notaresco. In July 2022, he moved to Eccellenza club L'Aquila.

== Personal life ==
Born in New Zealand, Scimia's father is Italian and mother is New Zealander.
