= Abbey of San Clemente =

Abbey of San Clemente may refer to:

- Abbey of San Clemente a Casauria, in the province of Pescara, Abruzzo
- Abbey of San Clemente al Volmano, in the province of Teramo, Abruzzo
