= Sean Parker (footballer) =

Italian footballer

Personal information
- Date of birth: 5 September 1997 (age 29)
- Place of birth: Ronciglione, Italy
- Height: 1.90 m (6 ft 3 in)
- Position: Forward

Team information
- Current team: Sorrento (on loan from Lecco)

Youth career
- –2014: Renato Curi Angolana
- 2014–2016: → Pescara (loan)
- 2016: Pescara
- 2016–2017: Vicenza
- 2017–2018: Bari

Senior career*
Years	Team	Apps	(Gls)
2016	Pescara	0	(0)
2016	→ San Nicolò (loan)	3	(0)
2017–2018	Bari	0	(0)
2017	→ Monopoli (loan)	0	(0)
2018	→ Lucchese (loan)	11	(0)
2018	Massese	16	(3)
2019–2024	Pro Patria	120	(14)
2024–2026	Pergolettese	51	(10)
2026–	Lecco	15	(0)
2026–	→ Sorrento (loan)	0	(0)
- * Club domestic league appearances and goals as of 22 August 2026

Giulio Sean Parker Articoli (born 5 September 1997) is an Italo English professional footballer who plays as a forward for Serie C Group C club Sorrento on loan from Lecco.

== Club career ==
Born in Ronciglione, to an English father and an Italian mother, Parker started his senior career at San Nicolò in Serie D.

On 29 January 2019, he joined Serie C club Pro Patria as a free agent. On 25 August 2021, his contract was extended until 2023.

On 29 July 2024, Parker signed a contract with Pergolettese for one season, with an option for a second.
