= Wolfgang Strengmann-Kuhn =

German politician (born 1964)

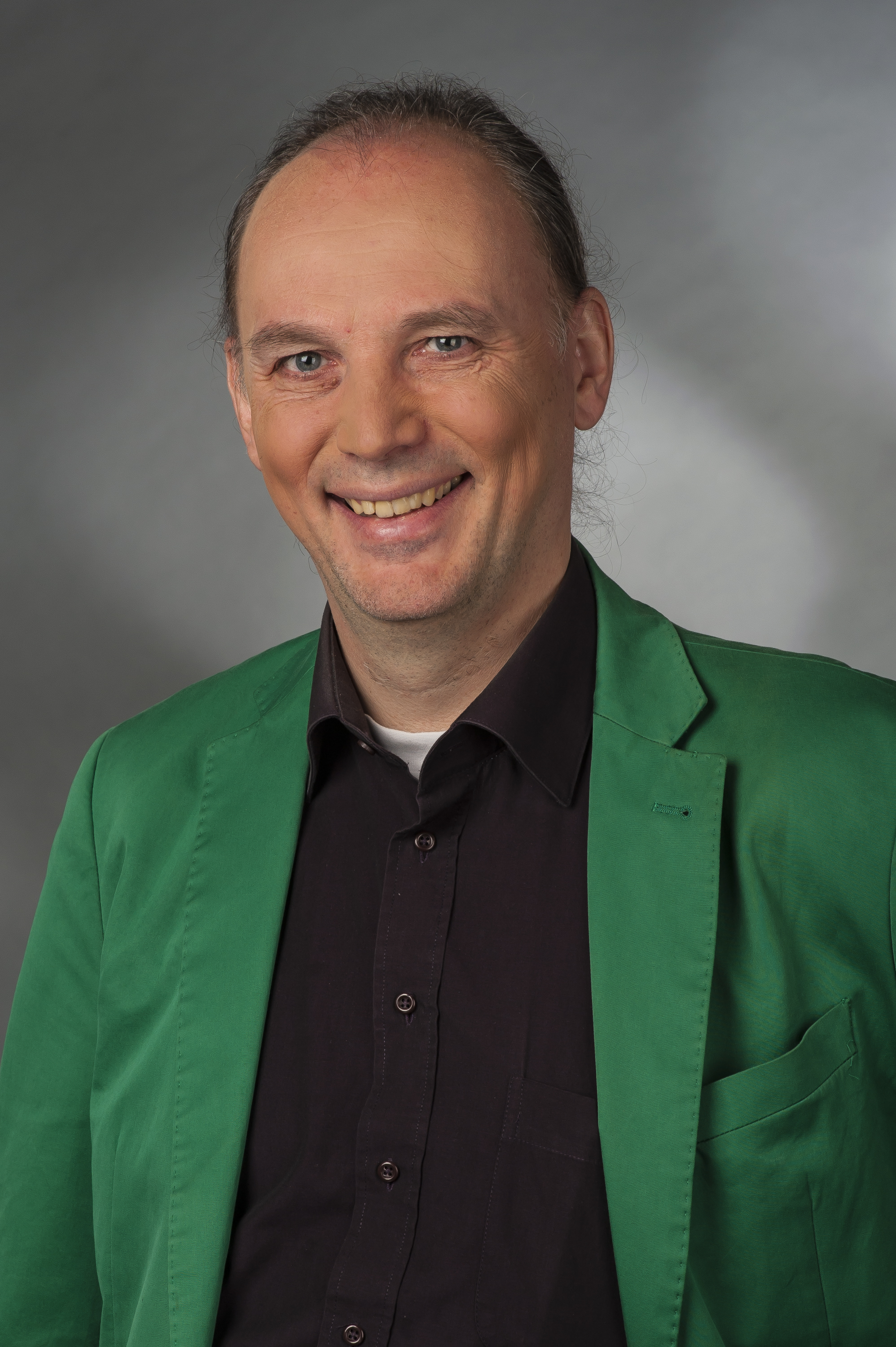
- Strengmann-Kuhn in 2014

Member of the Bundestag
- In office 2017–2025

Personal details
- Born: 20 May 1964 (age 62) Dinslaken, West Germany (now Germany)
- Party: Greens
- Children: 2
- Occupation: Economist

Wolfgang Strengmann-Kuhn (born 20 May 1964) is a German politician of the Alliance 90/The Greens who served as a member of the Bundestag from the state of Hesse from 2008 to 2013 and again from 2014 to 2025.

== Early life and education ==
After graduating from high school, Strengmann-Kuhn studied economics at the University of Bielefeld, graduating as Diplom-Volkswirt in 1992.

== Early career ==
Strengmann-Kuhn then worked as a research assistant at the Faculty of Sociology at Bielefeld University from 1993 to 1995, at the Department of Economics at Goethe University Frankfurt from 1995 to 2000 and at the Faculty of Economics and Social Sciences at the University of Hohenheim from 2001 to 2003.

== Political career ==
Strengmann-Kuhn was a member of the Bundestag from 4 January 2008 to 2013 as successor to Margareta Wolf, representing the Offenbach district. At the end of January 2014, he returned to the Bundestag as successor to Priska Hinz.

In parliament, Strengmann-Kuhn was a member of the Finance Committee and the Study Group on Vocational Education and Training. He also served as his parliamentary group's spokesman on labour market policy and European social policy.

In the negotiations to form a so-called traffic light coalition of the Social Democratic Party (SPD), the Green Party and the Free Democratic Party (FDP) on the national level following the 2021 German elections, Strengmann-Kuhn was part of his party's delegation in the working group on labour policy, co-chaired by Hubertus Heil, Katharina Dröge and Johannes Vogel.

In August 2024, Strengmann-Kuhn announced that he would not stand in the 2025 federal elections but instead resign from active politics by the end of the parliamentary term.

== Other activities ==
- German Federation for the Environment and Nature Conservation (BUND), Member
- German United Services Trade Union (ver.di), Member
- Institut Solidarische Moderne (ISM), Member

== Political positions ==
Amid the European migrant crisis in 2015, Strengmann-Kuhn joined fellow Green parliamentarians Luise Amtsberg, Annalena Baerbock, Franziska Brantner and Manuel Sarrazin in calling for more responsibilities for the European Commission in managing the European Union's intake of refugees, a clear mandate for Frontex and EU-managed facilities for asylum seekers in their countries of origin.
