= Uta Zapf =

German politician (born 1941)

Member of the Bundestag; from Hesse
- In office 26 October 1998 – 22 October 2013
- Constituency: State list (1990–1998); Offenbach (1998–2005); State list (2005–2013)

Personal details
- Born: Uta Poetschke; 14 August 1941 (age 85) Liegnitz, Lower Silesia, Germany
- Party: Social Democratic
- Children: 1
- Education: LMU Munich

Uta Zapf (née Poetschke; born 14 August 1941) is a German politician and member of the Bundestag (SPD).

Since 1998, she has been the chairperson of the subcommittee for "Disarmament, Arms Control, and Nonproliferation" of the Foreign Affairs Committee of the German Bundestag.

== Early life and education ==
After the completion of her Abitur in 1961, Zapf studied Germanistics, English studies, and literature at LMU Munich. Afterwards, she worked as a freelancer as an editor and translator for publishers. Later she also worked as an instructor in adult education

== Political career ==
Zapf joined the SPD in 1972, and since 1990 has been the chairperson of the commission of "International Politics and Peace" (Internationale Politik und Frieden) of the SPD executive committee for South Hesse (Hessen Süd).

She has belonged to the SPD executive committee of South Hesse since 1983 and has been acting chairperson since 1990. In 2003, she was one of the co-founders of the "One World" ("Eine World") Forum in the district. Since 2005, she has also led the migration working group for the district collective.

== Member of the Bundestag ==
From 1985 to 1992, Zapf was part of the council government for the city of Dreieich.

Since 1990, she has been a member of the German Bundestag. Here, from 1995 to 1998, she was the speaker for the working group "Disarmament and Arms Control" and also chairperson for the discussion group on the Kurds for the SPD Parliamentary faction.

Since 1998, Uta Zapf has been chairperson of the subcommittee for "Disarmament, Arms Control, and Nonproliferation" of the Foreign Affairs Committee and also acting person for the faction working group on "Foreign Policy." From 1998 to 2005, she was part of the SPD faction executive committee.

Zapf was directly elected in the 1998 and 2002 federal elections as a member of the Bundestag for the constituency of Offenbach am Main.

== Personal life ==
Zapf is married and has one child.
