= Peter Wichtel =

German politician (born 1949)

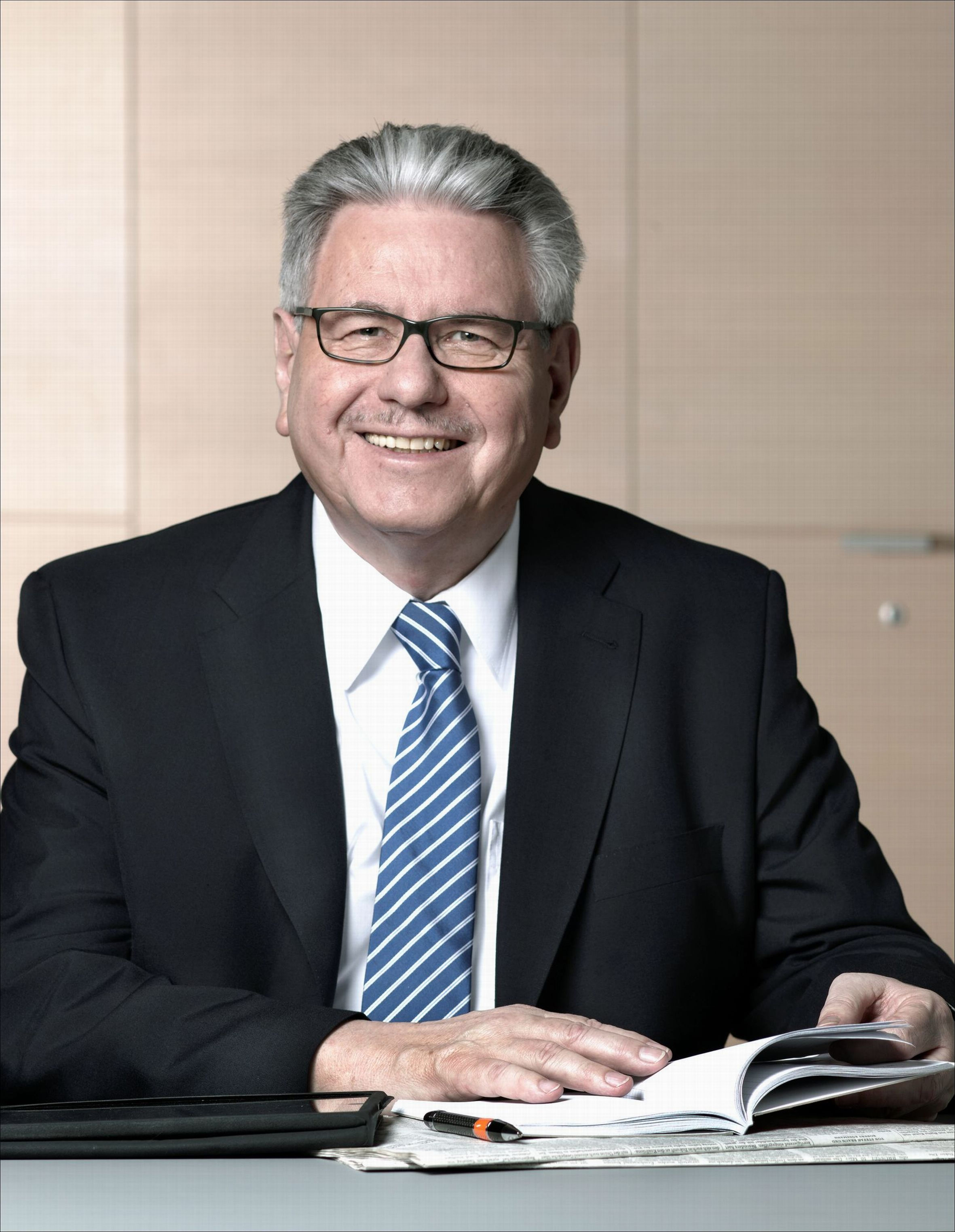
- Wichtel in 2013

Member of Bundestag; for Offenbach
- In office 27 October 2009 – 24 October 2017
- Preceded by: Klaus Lippold
- Succeeded by: Björn Simon

Personal details
- Born: Heinz Peter Wichtel; 5 January 1949 (age 77) Büdingen, Germany
- Party: Christian Democratic Union
- Children: 1

Heinz Peter Wichtel (born 5 January 1949) is a German politician (CDU) and trade unionist.

Wichtel was a member of the German Bundestag from 2009 to 2017. In the 18th legislative period, he was a full member of the Committee on Transport and Digital Infrastructure, as well as a deputy member of the Sports Committee. Wichtel has been a member of ver.di trade union (formerly ÖTV) since 1974.

== Biography ==
Wichtel attended compulsory school in Büdingen and Offenbach am Main. After training as a retail salesman, he initially worked in wholesale and retail between 1966 and 1970. In 1971, he started working in the personnel social service department at Fraport AG. In 1975, he became a member of the Works Council and its Chairman from 2002 to 2010. From 2004 to 2012, he was also a member of the supervisory board and Chairman of the Personnel Committee. In November 2012, his work for the company came to an end.

In 2008, Wichtel was awarded the Social Market Economy Prize of the Konrad Adenauer Foundation, which honors individuals who have made outstanding contributions in the spirit of the social market economy. In its statement of reasons, the jury said that Wichtel had played a key role in shaping working conditions at Fraport AG in the interests of employees, always keeping the welfare of the company and the Frankfurt site in mind. He represented a trade union image that helped to overcome the apparent contradictions between employee and capital interests.

== Political career ==
Wichtel has been a member of the Christian Democratic Employees' Association (CDA) since 1972 and was deputy chairman of the Hesse state association from 1991 to 2010. From 1976 to 2006, he was Chairman of the CDA's Frankfurt Airport Works Group. Since 2009, Peter Wichtel has been a member and assessor on the executive board of the Employees' Group in the German Bundestag.

Wichtel has been a member of the CDU since 1977. He was a city councilor in Obertshausen from 1981 to 2010, and was elected city council chairman in 2001. He was chairman of the Obertshausen CDU from 1993 to 2001 and has been its honorary chairman since 2010. He has also served on the state executive committee of the CDU Hessen since 2000. Between 1989 and 2001, he was also an honorary town councilor.

=== Member of parliament ===
In the 2009 Bundestag election, he stood in the Offenbach constituency and won the direct mandate with 40.2% of the first votes. In the election to the 18th German Bundestag in 2013, he again won the direct mandate in the Offenbach constituency and increased his result to 45.5% of the first votes. Since then, Wichtel has been a member of the Committee for Transport and Digital Infrastructure as well as a deputy member of the Sports Committee for the CDU/CSU parliamentary group. He did not run again for a mandate in the 2017 Bundestag election.
