= Björn Simon =

German politician (born 1981)

Björn Simon MdB

Member of the Bundestag; for Offenbach
- Incumbent
- Assumed office 24 October 2017
- Preceded by: Peter Wichtel

Personal details
- Born: Björn Manuel Simon; 18 May 1981 (age 45) Offenbach am Main, West Germany
- Party: Christian Democratic Union
- Children: 2
- Education: Goethe University Frankfurt

Björn Simon (born 18 May 1981) is a German politician of the Christian Democratic Union (CDU) who has been serving as a member of the Bundestag from the state of Hesse since 2017.

== Political career ==
Simon became a member of the Bundestag in the 2017 German federal election, representing the Offenbach district. He is a member of the Committee on the Environment, Nature Conservation and Nuclear Safety and the Committee on Transport and Digital Infrastructure. In this capacity, he serves as his parliamentary group’s rapporteur on resource efficiency and the circular economy.

== Other activities ==
- Federal Network Agency for Electricity, Gas, Telecommunications, Posts and Railway (BNetzA), Member of the Rail Infrastructure Advisory Council (since 2025)
