= Offenbach (electoral district) =

Federal electoral district of Germany

184 Offenbach
- Electoral district for the Bundestag
- Offenbach in 2025
- State: Hesse
- Population: 367,100 (2019)
- Electorate: 219,511 (2021)
- Major settlements: Offenbach am Main; Dreieich; Langen
- Area: 241.4 km^{2}

Current electoral district
- Created: 1949
- Party: CDU
- Member: Björn Simon
- Elected: 2017, 2021, 2025

Offenbach is an electoral constituency (German: Wahlkreis) represented in the Bundestag. It elects one member via first-past-the-post voting. Under the current constituency numbering system, it is designated as constituency 184. It is located in southern Hesse, comprising the city of Offenbach am Main and the western part of the Landkreis Offenbach district.

Offenbach was created for the inaugural 1949 federal election. Since 2017, it has been represented by Björn Simon of the Christian Democratic Union (CDU).

== Geography ==
Offenbach is located in southern Hesse. As of the 2021 federal election, it comprises the independent city of Offenbach am Main and the municipalities of Dietzenbach, Dreieich, Egelsbach, Heusenstamm, Langen (Hessen), Mühlheim am Main, Neu-Isenburg, and Obertshausen from the Landkreis Offenbach district.

== History ==
Offenbach was created in 1949, then known as Offenbach/M. It acquired its current name in the 1965 election. In the 1949 election, it was Hesse constituency 19 in the numbering system. From 1953 through 1976, it was number 144. From 1980 through 1998, it was number 142. In the 2002 and 2005 elections, it was number 186. In the 2009 through 2021 elections, it was number 185. From the 2025 election, it has been number 184.

Originally, the constituency comprised the independent city of Offenbach am Main and the Landkreis Offenbach district. In the 1965 through 1972 elections, it comprised the city of Offenbach am Main and the entirety of the Landkreis Offenbach district excluding the municipalities of Dietzenbach, Dreieichenhain, Dudenhofen, Froschhausen, Götzenhain, Hainhausen, Hainstadt, Jügesheim, Klein-Auheim, Klein-Krotzenburg, Klein-Welzheim, Mainflingen, Offenthal, Rembrücken, Seligenstadt, Steinheim am Main, Weiskirchen, and Zellhausen. In the 1976 through 1998 elections, it acquired a configuration very similar to its current borders, but excluding the municipality of Dietzenbach from the Landkreis Offenbach district. It acquired its current borders in the 2002 election.

Election	No.	Name	Borders
1949	19	Offenbach/M	Offenbach am Main city; Landkreis Offenbach district
1953	144	Offenbach/M	Offenbach am Main city; Landkreis Offenbach district
1957	144	Offenbach/M	Offenbach am Main city; Landkreis Offenbach district
1961	144	Offenbach/M	Offenbach am Main city; Landkreis Offenbach district
1965	144	Offenbach	Offenbach am Main city; Landkreis Offenbach district (excluding Dietzenbach, Dreieichenhain, Dudenhofen, Froschhausen, Götzenhain, Hainhausen, Hainstadt, Jügesheim, Klein-Auheim, Klein-Krotzenburg, Klein-Welzheim, Mainflingen, Offenthal, Rembrücken, Seligenstadt, Steinheim am Main, Weiskirchen, and Zellhausen municipalities)
1969	144	Offenbach	Offenbach am Main city; Landkreis Offenbach district (excluding Dietzenbach, Dreieichenhain, Dudenhofen, Froschhausen, Götzenhain, Hainhausen, Hainstadt, Jügesheim, Klein-Auheim, Klein-Krotzenburg, Klein-Welzheim, Mainflingen, Offenthal, Rembrücken, Seligenstadt, Steinheim am Main, Weiskirchen, and Zellhausen municipalities)
1972	144	Offenbach	Offenbach am Main city; Landkreis Offenbach district (excluding Dietzenbach, Dreieichenhain, Dudenhofen, Froschhausen, Götzenhain, Hainhausen, Hainstadt, Jügesheim, Klein-Auheim, Klein-Krotzenburg, Klein-Welzheim, Mainflingen, Offenthal, Rembrücken, Seligenstadt, Steinheim am Main, Weiskirchen, and Zellhausen municipalities)
1976	144	Offenbach	Offenbach am Main city; Landkreis Offenbach district (only Dreieich, Egelsbach, Heusenstamm, Langen (Hessen), Mühlheim am Main, Neu-Isenburg, and Obertshausen municipalities)
1980	142	Offenbach	Offenbach am Main city; Landkreis Offenbach district (only Dreieich, Egelsbach, Heusenstamm, Langen (Hessen), Mühlheim am Main, Neu-Isenburg, and Obertshausen municipalities)
1983	142	Offenbach	Offenbach am Main city; Landkreis Offenbach district (only Dreieich, Egelsbach, Heusenstamm, Langen (Hessen), Mühlheim am Main, Neu-Isenburg, and Obertshausen municipalities)
1987	142	Offenbach	Offenbach am Main city; Landkreis Offenbach district (only Dreieich, Egelsbach, Heusenstamm, Langen (Hessen), Mühlheim am Main, Neu-Isenburg, and Obertshausen municipalities)
1990	142	Offenbach	Offenbach am Main city; Landkreis Offenbach district (only Dreieich, Egelsbach, Heusenstamm, Langen (Hessen), Mühlheim am Main, Neu-Isenburg, and Obertshausen municipalities)
1994	142	Offenbach	Offenbach am Main city; Landkreis Offenbach district (only Dreieich, Egelsbach, Heusenstamm, Langen (Hessen), Mühlheim am Main, Neu-Isenburg, and Obertshausen municipalities)
1998	142	Offenbach	Offenbach am Main city; Landkreis Offenbach district (only Dreieich, Egelsbach, Heusenstamm, Langen (Hessen), Mühlheim am Main, Neu-Isenburg, and Obertshausen municipalities)
2002	186	Offenbach	Offenbach am Main city; Landkreis Offenbach district (only Dietzenbach, Dreieich, Egelsbach, Heusenstamm, Langen (Hessen), Mühlheim am Main, Neu-Isenburg, and Obertshausen municipalities)
2005	186	Offenbach	Offenbach am Main city; Landkreis Offenbach district (only Dietzenbach, Dreieich, Egelsbach, Heusenstamm, Langen (Hessen), Mühlheim am Main, Neu-Isenburg, and Obertshausen municipalities)
2009	185	Offenbach	Offenbach am Main city; Landkreis Offenbach district (only Dietzenbach, Dreieich, Egelsbach, Heusenstamm, Langen (Hessen), Mühlheim am Main, Neu-Isenburg, and Obertshausen municipalities)
2013	185	Offenbach	Offenbach am Main city; Landkreis Offenbach district (only Dietzenbach, Dreieich, Egelsbach, Heusenstamm, Langen (Hessen), Mühlheim am Main, Neu-Isenburg, and Obertshausen municipalities)
2017	185	Offenbach	Offenbach am Main city; Landkreis Offenbach district (only Dietzenbach, Dreieich, Egelsbach, Heusenstamm, Langen (Hessen), Mühlheim am Main, Neu-Isenburg, and Obertshausen municipalities)
2021	185	Offenbach	Offenbach am Main city; Landkreis Offenbach district (only Dietzenbach, Dreieich, Egelsbach, Heusenstamm, Langen (Hessen), Mühlheim am Main, Neu-Isenburg, and Obertshausen municipalities)
2025	184	Offenbach	Offenbach am Main city; Landkreis Offenbach district (only Dietzenbach, Dreieich, Egelsbach, Heusenstamm, Langen (Hessen), Mühlheim am Main, Neu-Isenburg, and Obertshausen municipalities)

== Members ==
The constituency was first represented by Harald Koch of the Social Democratic Party (SPD) from 1949 to 1953, followed by Wilhelm Banse of the SPD from 1953 to 1957. Karl Kanka won it for the Christian Democratic Union (CDU) in 1957. Horst Schmidt regained it for the SPD in 1961 and served three terms. Manfred Coppik succeeded him in 1972 and was representative until 1983. Klaus Lippold of the CDU then served from 1983 to 1998. Uta Zapf of the SPD was elected in 1998 and held the constituency for two terms, before former member Lippold regained it in 2005. He was succeeded by fellow CDU member Peter Wichtel in 2009, who served until 2017. Björn Simon was elected in 2017 and re-elected in 2021.

Election	Member	Party	%
1949	Harald Koch	SPD	37.2
1953	Wilhelm Banse	SPD	40.0
1957	Karl Kanka	CDU	42.9
1961	Horst Schmidt	SPD	45.6
1965	Horst Schmidt	SPD	49.1
1969	Horst Schmidt	SPD	54.8
1972	Manfred Coppik	SPD	54.5
1976	Manfred Coppik	SPD	46.9
1980	Manfred Coppik	SPD	47.0
1983	Klaus Lippold	CDU	48.6
1987	Klaus Lippold	CDU	47.6
1990	Klaus Lippold	CDU	47.1
1994	Klaus Lippold	CDU	47.4
1998	Uta Zapf	SPD	43.5
2002	Uta Zapf	SPD	43.4
2005	Klaus Lippold	CDU	43.7
2009	Peter Wichtel	CDU	40.2
2013	Peter Wichtel	CDU	45.5
2017	Björn Simon	CDU	35.4
2021	Björn Simon	CDU	27.8
2025	Björn Simon	CDU	31.2

== Election results ==
=== 2025 election ===
Federal election (2025): Offenbach
Notes:	Blue background denotes the winner of the electorate vote. Pink background denotes a candidate elected from their party list. Yellow background denotes an electorate win by a list member, or other incumbent. A ✓ or ✗ denotes status of any incumbent, win or lose respectively.						
Party	Candidate	Votes	%	±%	Party votes	%	±%
CDU	✓ Björn Simon	53,812	31.2	▲3.4	47,974	27.7	▲4.8
SPD	Laura Wolf	38,383	22.2	▼4.1	30,178	17.4	▼7.5
AfD	Peter Lutz	26,300	15.2	▲7.6	26,232	15.2	▲7.4
Greens	Tarek al-Wazir	25,416	14.7	▼2.1	22,646	13.1	▼4.3
Left	Magdalena Depta-Wollenhaupt	17,842	10.3	▲5.5	19,893	11.5	▲6.5
BSW					9,769	5.6	New
FDP	Ernestos Varvaroussis	6,606	3.8	▼5.7	9,360	5.4	▼7.8
Tierschutzpartei					2,218	1.3	▼0.2
FW	Lukas Mengel	4,159	2.4	0.0	1,839	1.1	▼0.4
Volt					1,539	0.9	▲0.1
PARTEI					858	0.5	▼0.4
BD					243	0.1	New
Humanists					147	0.1	0.0
MLPD					67	<0.1	0.0
Informal votes		1,852			1,407		
Total valid votes		172,516			172,963		
Turnout		174,370	79.9	▲7.9			
CDU hold	Majority	15,429	9.0	▲7.6			

=== 2021 election ===
Federal election (2021): Offenbach
Notes:	Blue background denotes the winner of the electorate vote. Pink background denotes a candidate elected from their party list. Yellow background denotes an electorate win by a list member, or other incumbent. A ✓ or ✗ denotes status of any incumbent, win or lose respectively.						
Party	Candidate	Votes	%	±%	Party votes	%	±%
CDU	✓ Björn Simon	43,347	27.8	▼8.5	35,754	22.9	▼7.6
SPD	Tuna Firat	41,035	26.4	▲1.4	38,799	24.9	▲3.5
Greens	Wolfgang Strengmann-Kuhn	26,229	16.8	▲8.0	27,062	17.4	▲7.2
FDP	Ernestos Varvaroussis	14,828	9.5	▲1.8	20,625	13.2	▲0.6
AfD	Christin Thüne	11,851	7.6	▼3.6	12,098	7.8	▼4.0
Left	Christine Buchholz	7,497	3.8	▼2.9	7,787	5.0	▼3.8
Team Todenhöfer					2,429	1.6	
FW	Dennis Lehmann	3,733	2.4	▲0.5	2,336	1.5	▲0.7
Tierschutzpartei					2,242	1.4	▲0.4
dieBasis	Stefan Billing	2,481	1.6		2,178	1.4	
PARTEI	Stephanie Birkle	2,029	1.3		1,380	0.9	▼0.1
Volt	Felix Kautz	1,534	1.0		1,178	0.8	
Pirates	Gregory Engels	1,157	0.7	▼0.2	849	0.5	0.0
Gesundheitsforschung					225	0.1	
V-Partei3					183	0.1	▼0.1
Humanists					163	0.1	
ÖDP					128	0.1	▼0.1
NPD					127	0.1	▼0.2
Bündnis C					96	0.1	
DKP					64	0.0	0.0
Bündnis 21					47	0.0	
LKR					38	0.0	
MLPD					26	0.0	0.0
Informal votes		2,331			2,238		
Total valid votes		155,721			155,814		
Turnout		158,052	72.0	▼2.3			
CDU hold	Majority	2,312	1.4	▼9.9			

=== 2017 election ===
Federal election (2017): Offenbach
Notes:	Blue background denotes the winner of the electorate vote. Pink background denotes a candidate elected from their party list. Yellow background denotes an electorate win by a list member, or other incumbent. A ✓ or ✗ denotes status of any incumbent, win or lose respectively.						
Party	Candidate	Votes	%	±%	Party votes	%	±%
CDU	Björn Simon	58,565	36.4	▼9.1	49,302	30.6	▼8.3
SPD	Tuna Firat	40,106	24.9	▼6.3	34,519	21.4	▼4.7
AfD	Arno Groß	18,047	11.2		19,050	11.8	▲6.0
Greens	Wolfgang Strengmann-Kuhn	14,246	8.8	▲0.7	16,421	10.2	▼0.5
Left	Christine Buchholz	12,435	7.7	▲1.6	14,261	8.8	▲2.2
FDP	Karl-Richard Krüger	12,420	7.7	▲4.9	20,372	12.6	▲6.3
Tierschutzpartei					1,642	1.0	
PARTEI					1,564	1.0	▲0.4
FW	Jürgen Ries	3,056	1.9	0.0	1,363	0.8	▼0.1
Pirates	Gregory Engels	1,586	1.0	▼1.5	945	0.6	▼1.8
NPD					429	0.3	▼0.8
BGE					354	0.2	
DM					322	0.2	
V-Partei³					294	0.2	
ÖDP					285	0.2	
MLPD					77	0.0	0.0
DKP					56	0.0	
BüSo					38	0.0	0.0
VIOLETTEN	Jochem-Frank Kalmbacher	522	0.3				
Informal votes		2,597			2,286		
Total valid votes		160,983			161,294		
Turnout		163,580	74.3	▲2.9			
CDU hold	Majority	18,459	11.5	▼2.8			

=== 2013 election ===
Federal election (2013): Offenbach
Notes:	Blue background denotes the winner of the electorate vote. Pink background denotes a candidate elected from their party list. Yellow background denotes an electorate win by a list member, or other incumbent. A ✓ or ✗ denotes status of any incumbent, win or lose respectively.						
Party	Candidate	Votes	%	±%	Party votes	%	±%
CDU	✓ Peter Wichtel	69,930	45.5	▲5.3	59,905	38.8	▲7.0
SPD	Dirk Gene Hagelstein	47,984	31.2	▲2.5	40,203	26.1	▲3.8
Greens	Wolfgang Strengmann-Kuhn	12,548	8.2	▼1.7	16,503	10.7	▼2.1
Left	Christine Buchholz	9,479	6.2	▼1.3	10,205	6.6	▼2.3
AfD					8,994	5.8	
FDP	Paul-Gerhard Weiß	4,376	2.8	▼7.4	9,836	6.4	▼12.0
Pirates	Vecih Yasaner	3,780	2.5		3,627	2.4	▼0.1
NPD	Frank Marschner	2,538	1.7	▲0.1	1,663	1.1	▼0.1
FW	Jürgen Ries	2,968	1.9		1,461	0.9	
PARTEI					839	0.5	
REP					626	0.4	▼0.3
PRO					224	0.1	
SGP					75	0.0	
BüSo					49	0.0	▼0.1
MLPD					40	0.0	0.0
Informal votes		4,637			3,990		
Total valid votes		153,603			154,250		
Turnout		158,240	71.4	▼0.4			
CDU hold	Majority	21,946	14.3	▲2.9			

=== 2009 election ===
Federal election (2009): Offenbach
Notes:	Blue background denotes the winner of the electorate vote. Pink background denotes a candidate elected from their party list. Yellow background denotes an electorate win by a list member, or other incumbent. A ✓ or ✗ denotes status of any incumbent, win or lose respectively.						
Party	Candidate	Votes	%	±%	Party votes	%	±%
CDU	Peter Wichtel	62,281	40.2	▼3.5	49,267	31.9	▼4.2
SPD	Uta Zapf	44,542	28.8	▼11.2	34,376	22.2	▼9.8
FDP	Vera Langer	15,843	10.2	▲5.4	28,409	18.4	▲5.8
Greens	Klaus-Uwe Gerhardt	15,243	9.8	▲4.2	19,863	12.8	▲2.0
Left	Christine Buchholz	11,594	7.5	▲3.2	13,813	8.9	▲3.8
Pirates					3,835	2.5	
Tierschutzpartei	Daniela Rinkenberger	2,722	1.8		1,858	1.2	▲0.4
NPD	Frank Marschner	2,434	1.6	0.0	1,766	1.1	0.0
REP					1,068	0.7	▼0.1
Independent	Ahmet Kansiz	229	0.1				
BüSo					198	0.1	▲0.1
DVU					150	0.1	
MLPD					41	0.0	0.0
Informal votes		3,969			4,213		
Total valid votes		154,888			154,644		
Turnout		158,857	71.8	▼5.4			
CDU hold	Majority	17,739	11.4	▲7.7			

=== 2005 election ===
Federal election (2005):Offenbach
Notes:	Blue background denotes the winner of the electorate vote. Pink background denotes a candidate elected from their party list. Yellow background denotes an electorate win by a list member, or other incumbent. A ✓ or ✗ denotes status of any incumbent, win or lose respectively.						
Party	Candidate	Votes	%	±%	Party votes	%	±%
CDU	Klaus Lippold	72,653	43.3	▲0.7	60,127	36.0	▼3.1
SPD	✗ Uta Zapf	66,517	40.0	▼3.5	53,436	32.0	▼3.4
Greens	Peter Schneider	9,325	5.6	▲0.3	18,135	10.9	▼1.1
FDP	Oliver Stirböck	7,990	4.8	▼1.0	20,946	12.6	▲3.7
Left	Rolf-Adam Gensert	7,193	4.3	▲3.0	8,578	5.1	▲3.7
NPD	Frank Marshner	2,637	1.6	▲0.5	1,848	1.1	▲0.8
Tierschutzpartei					1,364	0.8	▲0.2
REP					1,275	0.8	0.0
GRAUEN					844	0.5	▲0.3
SGP					143	0.1	
BüSo					128	0.1	0.0
MLPD					65	0.0	
Informal votes		3,953			3,379		
Total valid votes		166,315			166,889		
Turnout		170,268	77.2	▼2.2			
CDU gain from SPD	Majority	6,136	3.7				
