= Gabriel Colombatti =

Argentine footballer

Personal information
- Full name: Gabriel Germán Colombatti
- Date of birth: 2 June 1990 (age 36)
- Place of birth: San Francisco, Córdoba, Argentina
- Height: 1.84 m (6 ft 0 in)
- Position: Centre-back

Team information
- Current team: Sambiase
- Number: 5

Youth career
- Sportivo Belgrano
- –2011: Boca Juniors

Senior career*
Years	Team	Apps	(Gls)
2011–2013	Racing Club	0	(0)
2012–2013	Deportivo Merlo	15	(0)
2013–2016	Sportivo Belgrano	33	(0)
2016–2017	Colegiales	19	(1)
2017–2018	Palmese	27	(2)
2018–2019	Fasano	28	(3)
2019	Giugliano	4	(0)
2019–2020	Corigliano Calabro	9	(0)
2020–2021	Notaresco	14	(0)
2021–2022	L'Aquila		
2022–2023	Misilmeri		
2023–	Sambiase	48	(4)
- * Club domestic league appearances and goals as of 27 September 2026

Gabriel Germán Colombatti (born 2 June 1990) is an Argentine footballer who plays as a centre back for Serie D club Sambiase.

== Career ==
Born in San Francisco, Córdoba, Grandis began playing football in the youth systems of Sportivo Belgrano and Boca Juniors. He signed his first professional contract with Racing Club de Avellaneda, but did not appear in any matches with the first team, instead making his Primera B Nacional debut while on loan at Deportivo Merlo. Colombatti joined his hometown club Sportivo Belgrano following their historic promotion to the Primera B Nacional in 2013. He played sparingly over four seasons, leaving the club for Club Atlético Colegiales in 2016.

Colombatti moved to Italy where he played for Serie D sides Palmese and Fasano.

On 8 July 2019, Italian club Giugliano announced the signing of Colombatti. He left the club in December 2019 to join fellow Serie D club Corigliano Calabro. In August 2020, Colombatti joined fellow league club Notaresco.

In December 2021, Colombatti signed for Eccellenza side L'Aquila. In July 2022, he joined Misilmeri.
