= Riccardo Idda =

Italian footballer

Personal information
- Date of birth: 26 December 1988 (age 37)
- Place of birth: Alghero, Italy
- Height: 1.85 m (6 ft 1 in)
- Position: Defender

Team information
- Current team: Ossese

Senior career*
| Years | Team | Apps | (Gls) |
| 2006–2007 | Tempio | 24 | (0) |
| 2007–2008 | Como | 32 | (0) |
| 2008–2010 | Brindisi | 58 | (0) |
| 2010–2011 | Villacidrese | 26 | (0) |
| 2011–2013 | Torres | 65 | (7) |
| 2013–2016 | Casertana | 98 | (3) |
| 2016–2017 | Virtus Francavilla | 37 | (4) |
| 2017–2021 | Cosenza | 118 | (3) |
| 2021–2023 | Virtus Francavilla | 67 | (1) |
| 2023–2026 | Torres | 67 | (1) |
| 2026– | Ossese | 0 | (0) |
- * Club domestic league appearances and goals as of 30 April 2026

Riccardo Idda (born 26 December 1988) is an Italian professional footballer who plays for Serie D club Ossese.

== Club career ==
He spent the first three years of his career in Serie D, before making his professional debut in the 2009–10 season in Serie C2 for Brindisi.

On 15 July 2017, he signed a two-year contract with Serie C club Cosenza. Cosenza advanced to Serie B at the end of the 2017–18 season.

On 5 August 2021, he returned to Virtus Francavilla.
