= Wilhelm Banse =

German politician (1911–1965)

Member of the Bundestag; for Offenbach/M
- In office 6 October 1953 – 15 October 1957
- Preceded by: Harald Koch
- Succeeded by: Karl Kanka

Personal details
- Born: 18 April 1911 Cologne, Germany
- Died: 16 April 1965 (aged 53) Frankfurt, West Germany
- Party: Social Democratic

Wilhelm Banse (18 April 1911 – 16 April 1965) was a German politician of the Social Democratic Party (SPD) and former member of the German Bundestag.

== Political career ==
Banse was a member of the Wetzlar district council from 1948 to 1951 and was elected to the Offenbach district in May 1952. He was a member of the German Bundestag from 1953 to 1957. In parliament, he represented the direct mandate of the Offenbach district of the Bundestag.

== Literature ==
Herbst, Ludolf; Jahn, Bruno (2002). Vierhaus, Rudolf (ed.). Biographisches Handbuch der Mitglieder des Deutschen Bundestages. 1949–2002 [Biographical Handbook of the Members of the German Bundestag. 1949–2002] (in German). München: De Gruyter - De Gruyter Saur. p. 1715. ISBN 978-3-11-184511-1.
