= Bansed =

- Village
- Location in Rajasthan, India Bansed (India)
- Coordinates: 26.63°N 74.62°E
- Country: India
- State: Rajasthan
- District: Nagaur
- Elevation: 223 m (732 ft)

Population (2011)
  - Total: 1,459

Languages
  - Official: Hindi
- Time zone: UTC+5:30 (IST)
- PIN: 341512
- Telephone code: 01587
- ISO 3166 code: RJ-IN
- Vehicle registration: RJ 21

Bansed is a village in Parbatsar tehsil in Nagaur District of Rajasthan.

== Geography ==
Bansed is located at 26.63°N 74.62°E.

== Demographics ==
As of 2011 India census, Bansed had a population of 1,459. Males constitute 741 of the population and females 718.
