= Miguel Ángel Martínez (Spanish footballer) =

Spanish footballer

Personal information
- Date of birth: 16 February 1995 (age 31)
- Place of birth: Madrid, Spain
- Height: 1.85 m (6 ft 1 in)
- Position: Goalkeeper

Team information
- Current team: Livorno
- Number: 91

Youth career
- Atlético Madrid
- Real Madrid
- –2014: Getafe
- Nike Academy

Senior career*
Years	Team	Apps	(Gls)
2016–2018	Catania	1	(0)
2018–2019	San Agustín	14	(0)
2019–2021	Catania	29	(0)
2021–2022	Triestina	9	(0)
2022–2023	Pordenone	6	(0)
2023–2025	Reggina	25	(0)
2025–2026	Birkirkara	26	(0)
2026–	Livorno	2	(0)
- * Club domestic league appearances and goals as of 29 August 2026

Miguel Ángel Martínez (born 16 February 1995) is a Spanish footballer who plays as a goalkeeper for Serie C Group B club Livorno.

== CLub career ==
In 2014, Ángel Martínez almost joined the first team of Spanish La Liga side Getafe but left due to injury.

In 2016, he signed for Catania in the Italian third division after playing for the English Nike Academy.

In 2018, he signed for Spanish fourth division club CF San Agustín del Guadalix, before returning to Catania.

Ángel Martínez, his mother and his sister are directors of Chamartín Vergara in Spain.

On 20 July 2021, he joined Serie C club Triestina.

On 18 August 2022, Ángel Martínez signed a one-year contract with Pordenone.
