= Mattia Marchi =

Italian footballer

Personal information
- Date of birth: 14 January 1989 (age 37)
- Place of birth: Rimini, Italy
- Height: 1.83 m (6 ft 0 in)
- Position: Forward

Youth career
- Rimini

Senior career*
Years	Team	Apps	(Gls)
2009–2010	Rimini	7	(0)
2010	→ Südtirol (loan)	15	(3)
2010–2011	Südtirol	32	(9)
2011–2012	Pavia	27	(8)
2012–2014	Entella	35	(7)
2014–2015	Cremonese	19	(1)
2015–2016	Pavia	26	(7)
2016–2017	Mantova	18	(6)
2017–2019	FeralpiSalò	70	(11)
2019–2021	Reggiana	25	(8)
2021	→ Südtirol (loan)	9	(1)
2021–2022	Virtus Verona	28	(3)
- * Club domestic league appearances and goals

Mattia Marchi (born 14 January 1989) is an Italian former footballer who played as a forward.

== Club career ==
=== Rimini ===
Born in Rimini, Romagna, Marchi started his career at hometown club Rimini. In January 2010 he left for Lega Pro 2nd Division club Südtirol, winning the champion of the group A.

=== Südtirol ===
Rimini was expelled from the professional league in 2010, and Marchi joined Chievo on a free transfer. However, he re-joined Südtirol in co-ownership deal for a peppercorn fee of €500 Südtirol bought Marchi outright for another €500 after he scored 9 goals as team top-scorer.

=== Virtus Entella ===
On 14 July 2011, he was signed by Serie A team Novara but re-sold to Pavia on 16 July in another co-ownership deal. He was the joint-topscorer along with Filippo Falco. Marchi also scored once in the relegation "play-out" (another goal by Alessandro Cesca), which helped the club survive relegation. In June 2012, he returned to Novara and re-sold to Entella on 1 August 2012. In June 2013, Marchi joined Entella outright from Novara for free.

=== Cremonese ===
On 25 July 2014 Marchi was signed by Cremonese.

=== Pavia ===
On 23 January 2015, Marchi was signed by Pavia.

=== Reggiana ===
On 30 July 2019, he signed a 3-year contract with Reggio Audace. On 16 January 2021, he returned to Südtirol on loan.

=== Virtus Verona ===
On 31 August 2021, he moved to Virtus Verona on a one-year deal with an extension option.
