= Notaresco =

- Comune
- Comune di Notaresco
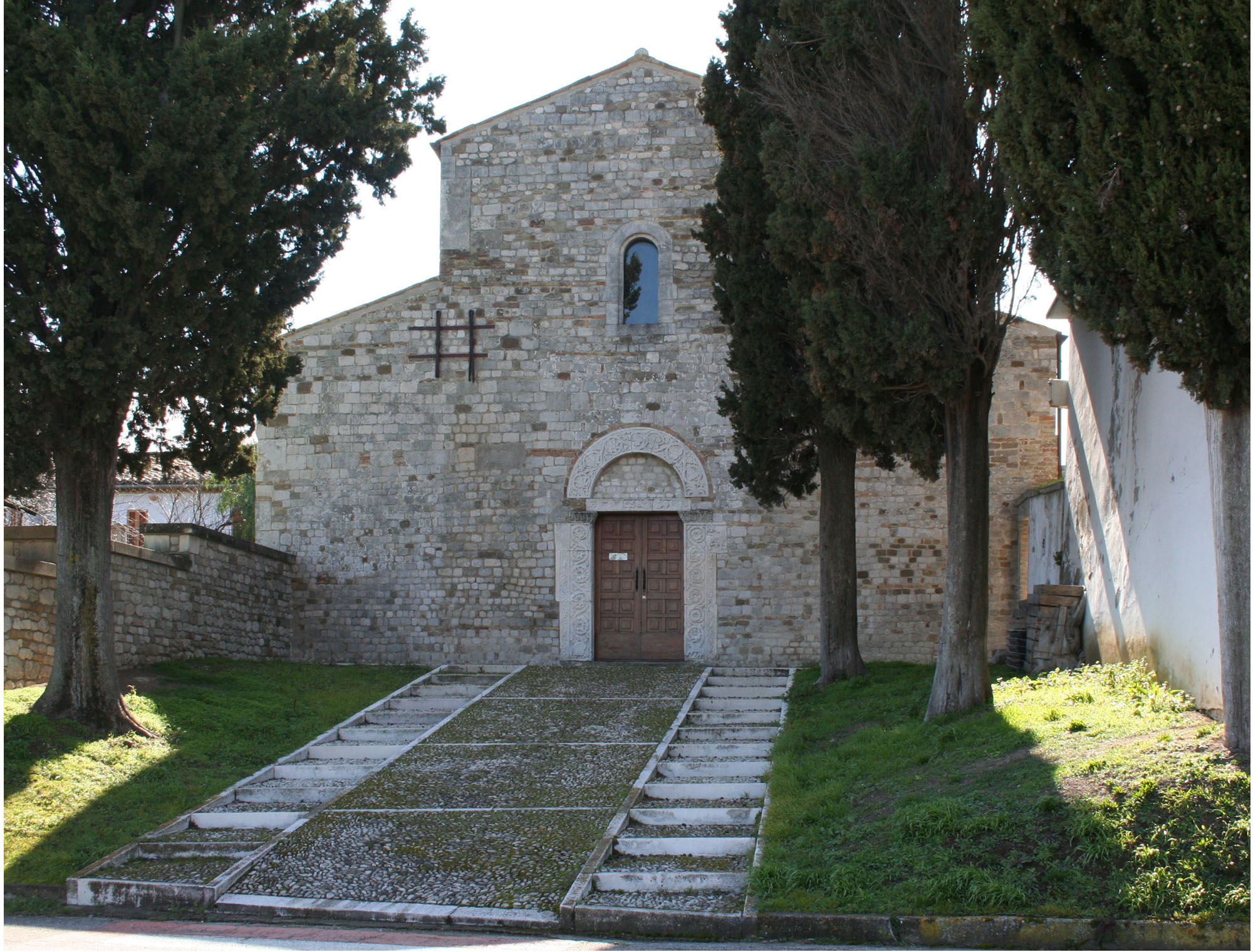
- Church of San Clemente in Vomano on Notaresco

- Location within Italy Location within Abruzzo
- Coordinates: 42°39′N 13°54′E
- Country: Italy
- Region: Abruzzo
- Province: Teramo (TE)
- Frazioni: Caporipe, Capracchia, Cordesco, Grasciano, Guardia Vomano, Pianura di Notaresco, Pianura Vomano, Saggio, Torrio, Valle Vignale, Villa Scapoli

Area
  - Total: 37 km^{2} (14 sq mi)
- Elevation: 267 m (876 ft)

Population (2020)
  - Total: 2 651
  - Density: 0.054/km^{2} (0.14/sq mi)
- Demonym: Notareschini
- Time zone: UTC+1 (CET)
  - Summer (DST): UTC+2 (CEST)
- Postal code: 64024
- Dialing code: 085
- ISTAT code: 067032
- Patron saint: San Gennaro

Notaresco (Teramano: Nutaràsche; Notareschino: Nutaròsche) is a town and comune in the Teramo province in the Abruzzo region of eastern central Italy. It has population of just under 3000. The patron saint of Notaresco is San Gennaro.

The sister city of Notaresco is Plonsk in Poland. Adjacent comunes include Atri, Castellalto, Cellino Attanasio, Morro d'Oro, Mosciano Sant'Angelo, and Roseto degli Abruzzi.

Conclusive evidence documents the existence of the town in the early centuries of the Christian era, though there is evidence of settlements in previous eras too. The layout of the town is typical of a medieval settlement which includes thick city walls accompanied by high and narrow windows. From the 14th to the 18th century Notaresco fell under the rule of the Acquaviva family.

== Attractions ==
- Church of San Rocco – contains a 16th-century terracotta of the Virgin Mary.
- San Clemente al Vomano – built in the 9th century and was largely replaced by a 12th-century structure. The church altar is decorated with precious stones. Above the altar rests a work by the sculptor Roberto di Ruggero.
- Archaeological museum G. Romualdi – containing fragments of Neolithic and Paleolithic cooking utensils, burial urns, and weapons. Nearby, in the area known as Grasciano, lie the ruins of a Roman villa.

== Notable citizens ==
- Giuseppe Devincenzi (1814–1903), politician and agronomist
- Renato Pirocchi (1933–2002), race car driver
- Giuseppe Romualdi (1877–1943), writer
- Ignazio Rozzi (1795–1870), naturalist
- Matteo Conte(1889-1934), decorated soldier

== Festivities ==
- Easter Monday – the Feast of Maria Corredentrice
- 1–15 August: International Tournament of "Bocce"
- 19 September – the Feast of San Gennaro
