= Abbey of San Clemente al Volmano =

Coordinates: 42.6344°N 13.8906°E

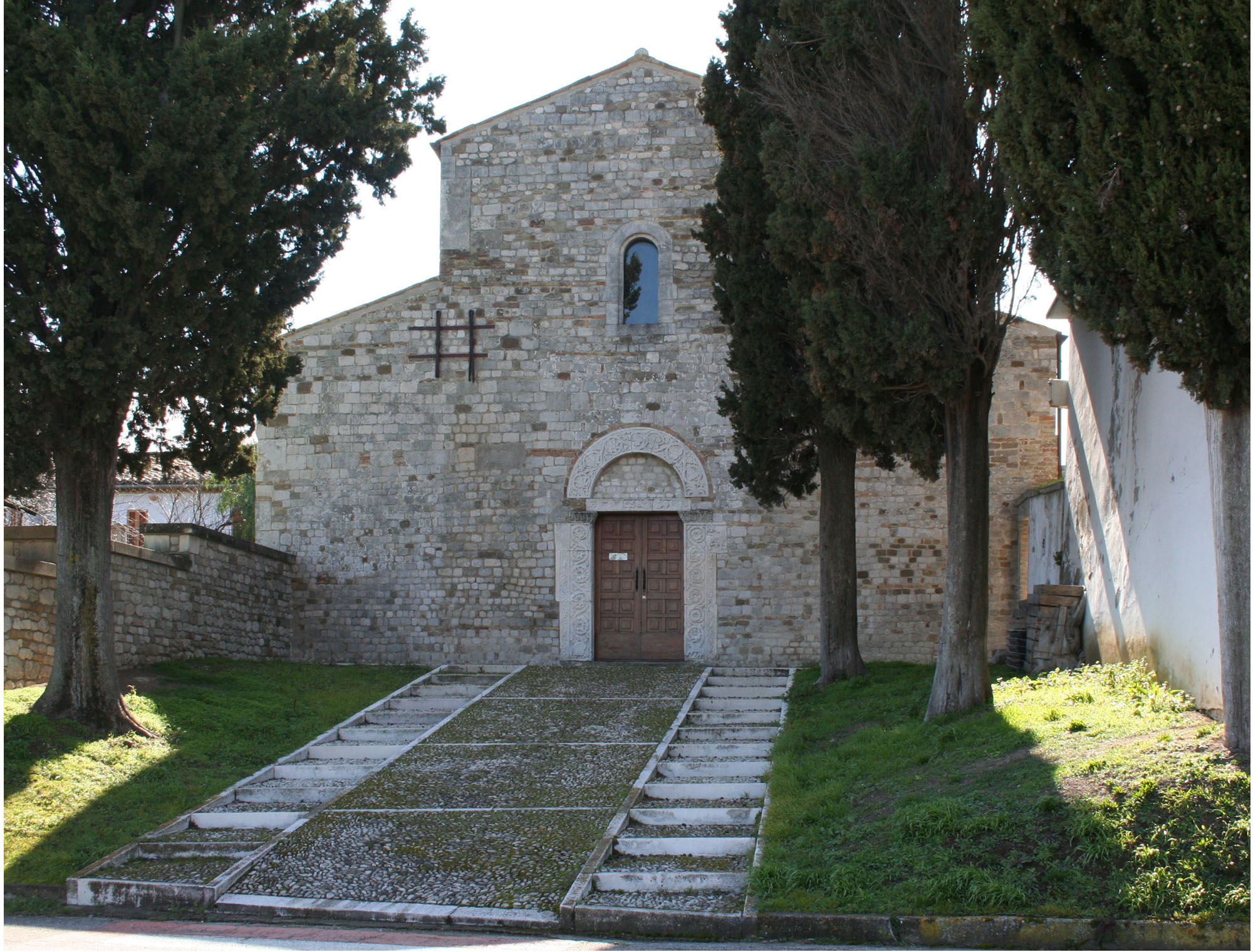

San Clemente al Volmano, also known as the Abbey of San Clemente, is a Romanesque-style, former-Benedictine church and monastery found in a rural site, on a hill above the Volmano River, in the frazione of Guardia Vomano of the town of Notaresco, in provincia di Teramo, Abruzzo, Italy.

== History ==
The abbey was founded by the Benedictines, putatively in 874. According to the Chronicon Casauriense (1182) is that while emperor Ludovico II himself commissioned the Casauria abbey after his release from the imprisonment by Adelchis of Benevento. Louis endowed that abbey with relics of the former Pope Clement I. Louis' mother Ermengarde of Tours, who was taking shelter at the nearby castle of Guardia, also provided for the founding of this abbey. Other sources claim it was founded instead by Louis II's daughter, Ermengard of Italy. In 911, a Saracen incursion destroyed both the Abbey of Casauria and San Clemente. Rebuilt, the monastery was again razed by the Normans in 1077.

As usual after the arson of church in this age, the relics of St Clement were discovered under the pavement of the church at the time of Abbot Grimoaldo (1096), and this encouraged again rebuilding of the monastery. The portal of the church has a date of 1108 for this reconstruction. However, soon the monastery fell again into ruin.

The adjacent convent has been in ruins since the 16th century. The layout of the church has three naves each ending with a semi-circular apse and supported by brick or stone pillars or columns. The presbytery interior is roofed by a sculpted 12th-century ciborium.

In the nave on the right, a polychrome wooden bust represents Pope Saint Clement, whereas on the other side there are interesting remains of frescos. Outside, the stone portal and the façade’s archivolt are both carved in a Romanesque style.

After a long restoration the abbey reopened in 2008.
