= Matteo Perri =

Italian footballer

Personal information
- Date of birth: 6 October 1998 (age 28)
- Place of birth: Rome, Italy
- Height: 1.80 m (5 ft 11 in)
- Position: Defender

Youth career
- –2016: Sampdoria
- 2016–2018: Ascoli

Senior career*
Years	Team	Apps	(Gls)
2015–2016	Sampdoria	0	(0)
2015–2016	→ Foligno (loan)	1	(0)
2016–2019	Ascoli	0	(0)
2018–2019	→ Viterbese (loan)	2	(0)
2019	→ Paganese (loan)	17	(1)
2019–2020	Paganese	26	(1)
2020–2021	Ravenna	29	(2)
2021–2022	Pordenone	13	(0)
2022–2023	Virton	12	(0)
2023	Dender EH	1	(0)
- * Club domestic league appearances and goals as of 15 June 2023

Matteo Perri (born 6 October 1998) is an Italian professional footballer who plays as a defender.

== Club career ==
He made his professional Serie C debut for Viterbese on 10 November 2018 in a game against Matera.

On 5 July 2021, he signed a three-year contract with Serie B club Pordenone. He made his Serie B debut for Pordenone on 3 October 2021 against Vicenza.

On 29 July 2022, Perri moved to Belgian side Virton on a permanent deal. After playing for Les Gaumais in the first part of the 2022–23 season, on 31 January 2023 he moved to fellow Belgian second-tier side Dender EH, signing a contract until June 2024 with the club.
