= Federico Secli =

Italian football player

Personal information
- Date of birth: 14 May 2002 (age 24)
- Place of birth: Udine, Italy
- Height: 1.90 m (6 ft 3 in)
- Position: Forward

Team information
- Current team: Albalonga

Youth career
- Pordenone
- 2018–2019: → Bologna (loan)

Senior career*
Years	Team	Apps	(Gls)
2020–2022	Pordenone	11	(0)
2022–	Albalonga	4	(0)
- * Club domestic league appearances and goals as of 24 September 2022

Federico Secli (born 14 May 2002) is an Italian football player. He plays for Serie D club Albalonga.

== Club career ==
He made his senior debut for Pordenone on 30 September 2020 in a Coppa Italia game against Casarano. He scored the final goal in a 3–0 victory. He made his Serie B debut on 6 March 2021 against Monza.
