= Mihael Onișa =

Romanian footballer

Personal information
- Date of birth: 15 March 2000 (age 26)
- Place of birth: Timișoara, Romania
- Height: 1.81 m (5 ft 11 in)
- Positions: Midfielder; left-back

Team information
- Current team: Voluntari
- Number: 44

Youth career
- –2013: LPS Banatul Timișoara
- 2013–2016: ACS Poli Timișoara
- 2016–2018: Virtus Entella
- 2018–2021: Torino

Senior career*
Years	Team	Apps	(Gls)
2020–2021	Torino	0	(0)
2020–2021	→ Cavese (loan)	4	(0)
2021	→ Imolese (loan)	7	(0)
2021–2023	Pordenone	3	(0)
2022–2023	→ Piacenza (loan)	8	(0)
2023–2024	Ceahlăul Piatra Neamț	24	(1)
2024–	Voluntari	49	(2)

International career
2016	Romania U16	2	(0)
2016	Romania U17	3	(0)
- * Club domestic league appearances and goals as of 2 November 2026

Mihael Onișa (born 15 March 2000) is a Romanian professional footballer who plays as a midfielder or left-back for Liga I club Voluntari.

== Career ==
After scoring twice to helping the Romania under-15 national team beat Italy, Onișa gained the attention of Red Bull Salzburg in Austria, Borussia Dortmund in Germany, English sides Liverpool and Everton, as well as Italian clubs Atalanta and Inter Milan.

In 2018, he signed for Torino in the Italian Serie A from Serie B outfit Virtus Entella and played for their Under-19 squad for the next two seasons. He was first called up to Torino's senior squad in July 2020 for two Serie A games, but remained on the bench.

On 1 September 2020, Onișa was sent on loan to Cavese in the Italian third-tier Serie C.

On 1 February 2021, he was loaned to another Serie C squad Imolese.

On 6 July 2021, he signed a three-year contract with Serie B squad Pordenone. On 19 August 2022, Onișa was loaned by Piacenza with an option to buy.
