= Emanuele Torrasi =

Italian footballer (born 1999)

Personal information
- Date of birth: 16 March 1999 (age 27)
- Place of birth: Milan, Italy
- Height: 1.80 m (5 ft 11 in)
- Position: Midfielder

Team information
- Current team: Catania

Youth career
- 2009–2018: AC Milan

Senior career*
| Years | Team | Apps | (Gls) |
| 2018–2020 | AC Milan | 1 | (0) |
| 2020–2022 | Imolese | 41 | (2) |
| 2022–2023 | Pordenone | 51 | (1) |
| 2023–2026 | Perugia | 75 | (2) |
| 2026 | Juve Stabia | 6 | (0) |
| 2026– | Catania | 0 | (0) |

International career^{‡}
| 2014 | Italy U15 | 7 | (0) |
| 2014 | Italy U16 | 4 | (0) |
| 2015 | Italy U17 | 1 | (0) |
| 2016–2017 | Italy U18 | 4 | (0) |
- * Club domestic league appearances and goals as of 29 August 2026 ‡ National team caps and goals as of 22 May 2018

Emanuele Torrasi (born 16 March 1999) is an Italian professional footballer who plays as a midfielder for Serie C Group C club Catania.

== Professional career ==
Having played for A.C. Milan's various youth teams since 2009, on 15 March 2018 Torrasi signed his first professional contract with the club until 30 June 2022. Torrasi made his professional debut for Milan in a 5–1 Serie A win over Fiorentina on 20 May 2018. He was called up to the senior squad in the 2018–19 and 2019–20 season, but did not make any additional field appearances.

On 18 August 2020 he signed a 2-year contract with Imolese.

On 31 January 2022, Torrasi signed a contract with Pordenone until June 2024.

On 29 August 2023, Torrasi joined Perugia on a three-year contract.

On 27 January 2026, Torrasi moved to Juve Stabia in Serie B on a one-and-a-half-year contract.
