= Kevin Biondi =

Italian footballer

Personal information
- Date of birth: 10 February 1999 (age 27)
- Place of birth: Catania, Italy
- Height: 1.77 m (5 ft 10 in)
- Position: Midfielder

Team information
- Current team: Desenzano
- Number: 24

Youth career
- –2019: Catania

Senior career*
Years	Team	Apps	(Gls)
2019–2021	Catania	45	(3)
2021–2023	Pordenone	31	(0)
2021–2022	→ Catania (loan)	27	(5)
2023	→ Rimini (loan)	13	(1)
2023–2024	Virtus Francavilla	35	(1)
2024–2025	Union Clodiense Chioggia	34	(8)
2025–2026	Livorno	32	(2)
2026–	Desenzano	1	(0)
- * Club domestic league appearances and goals as of 23 August 2026

Kevin Biondi (born 10 February 1999) is an Italian professional footballer who plays as a midfielder for Serie C Group A club Desenzano.

== Career ==
=== Early career ===
Kevin Biondi started playing football in the Catania youth sector. He made his debut in professional football on 25 August 2019, in the 6–3 away victory against Avellino. He made 27 appearances and 4 goals. In the 2020–21 season he made 20 appearances and scored one goal for Catania. On 1 February 2021, he signed a four-and-a-half-year contract for Pordenone. He made his debut in the 1–2 home defeat on 6 February 2021 against Vicenza. On 31 August 2021, Biondi returned to Catania on loan. Catania went bankrupt during the season, and Biondi was allowed to return to Pordenone before the 2021–22 season ended. On 12 January 2023, Biondi joined Rimini on loan.

On 8 September 2023, Biondi signed with Virtus Francavilla.

== Style of play ==
He is good at running, technique, intensity and ability to score. He can play as full back, mezz'ala and attacking wing.
