= Cristian Andreoni =

Italian football player (born 1992)

Personal information
- Date of birth: 30 May 1992 (age 34)
- Place of birth: Vaprio d'Adda, Italy
- Height: 1.78 m (5 ft 10 in)
- Position: Defender

Team information
- Current team: Crotone
- Number: 28

Youth career
- Milan

Senior career*
Years	Team	Apps	(Gls)
2010–2012	Pontisola	63	(0)
2012–2014	Pro Patria	38	(0)
2014–2016	Reggiana	39	(0)
2017	Lugano	0	(0)
2017–2018	Bassano Virtus	29	(1)
2018–2019	Vicenza	14	(0)
2019–2020	Ascoli	26	(0)
2020–2022	Bari	4	(0)
2022	→ Pordenone (loan)	11	(0)
2022–2023	Pordenone	8	(0)
2023–2026	Juve Stabia	36	(0)
2025–2026	→ Crotone (loan)	12	(0)
2026–	Crotone	5	(0)
- * Club domestic league appearances and goals as of 26 September 2026

Cristian Andreoni (born 30 May 1992) is an Italian professional footballer who plays as a defender for Serie C Group C club Crotone.

== Club career ==
After starting his senior career in Serie D, he made his professional debut in the Serie C on 1 September 2013 for Pro Patria in a game against Cremonese.

On 31 January 2019, he signed a 1.5-year contract with Serie B club Ascoli.

He made his Serie B debut for Ascoli on 16 March 2019 in a game against Verona, as a 90th-minute substitute for Lorenzo Laverone.

On 3 September 2020 he joined Serie C side Bari, signing a 3-year contract. On 31 January 2022, Andreoni moved to Serie B club Pordenone on loan. On 11 July 2022, he returned to Pordenone (by then relegated to Serie C) on a permanent basis with a two-year contract.

On 19 September 2023, Andreoni signed with Juve Stabia until the end of the season.
