= Aldo Banse =

Italian footballer (born 2002)

Personal information
- Date of birth: 4 December 2002 (age 23)
- Place of birth: San Vito al Tagliamento, Italy
- Height: 1.78 m (5 ft 10 in)
- Position: Forward

Team information
- Current team: Pro Sesto
- Number: 45

Youth career
- Pordenone
- 2018–2019: → Torino (loan)

Senior career*
Years	Team	Apps	(Gls)
2020–2022	Pordenone	3	(0)
2022–2023	Cjarlins Muzane	39	(4)
2023–2024	La Salute		
2024–2025	Gravina	22	(4)
2025–2026	Fidelis Andria	13	(0)
2026–	Pro Sesto	7	(1)
- * Club domestic league appearances and goals as of 1 March 2026

Aldo Banse (born 4 December 2002) is an Italian football player of Burkinabé descent who plays for Serie D club Pro Sesto.

== Club career ==
He made his senior debut for Pordenone on 30 September 2020 in a Coppa Italia game against Casarano. He made his Serie B debut for Pordenone on 13 February 2021 in a game against Cittadella. He substituted Gianvito Misuraca in the 81st minute of a 0–1 home loss. He collected two more appearances in his debut professional season, both of which as a substitute.

On 31 January 2022, Banse moved to Cjarlins Muzane in Serie D.
