= US Livorno 1915 =

Association football club in Italy

Livorno
- Full name: Unione Sportiva Livorno 1915
- Nicknames: Gli Amaranto (transl. The Dark Reds); I Labronici (transl. The Lighbourners); Le Triglie (transl. The Mullets)
- Founded: 1915; 111 years ago
- Stadium: Armando Picchi
- Capacity: 14,267
- President: Joel Esciua
- Head coach: Cristiano Lucarelli
- League: Serie C Group B
- 2025-26: Serie C Group B, 11th of 20
- Website: uslivorno.com
Home colours	Away colours

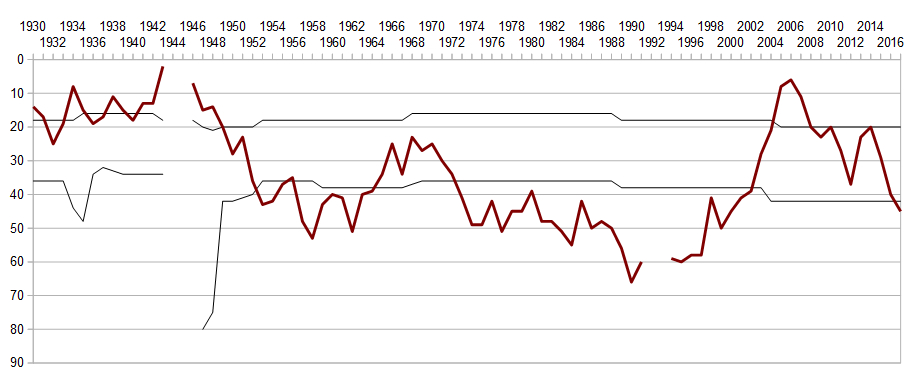
The progress of Livorno in the Italian football league structure since the first season of a united Serie A (1929/30). The graph depicts only four upper tiers, hence the hole in the early 1990s.

Unione Sportiva Livorno 1915 (formerly A.S. Livorno Calcio, commonly known as Livorno), is a professional football club based in Livorno, Tuscany, Italy. They compete in Serie C, the third tier of the Italian football league system. The team's colour is dark red (amaranto in Italian, from which the team nickname derives).

Livorno were one of the original sides of Serie A, the top flight of Italian football, but have been relegated seven times from the top flight and have undergone two club refoundings in 1991 and 2021, necessitating a rise from the regional Eccellenza leagues. Their longest spells in the top division were from 1940 to 1949 (accounting for seven seasons) and from 2004 to 2008. The amaranto have won Serie B on two occasions, the Lega Pro Prima Divisione and Lega Pro Seconda Divisione once each, and the Supercoppa di Serie C once as well. Livorno play their home matches at the Stadio Armando Picchi.

== History ==
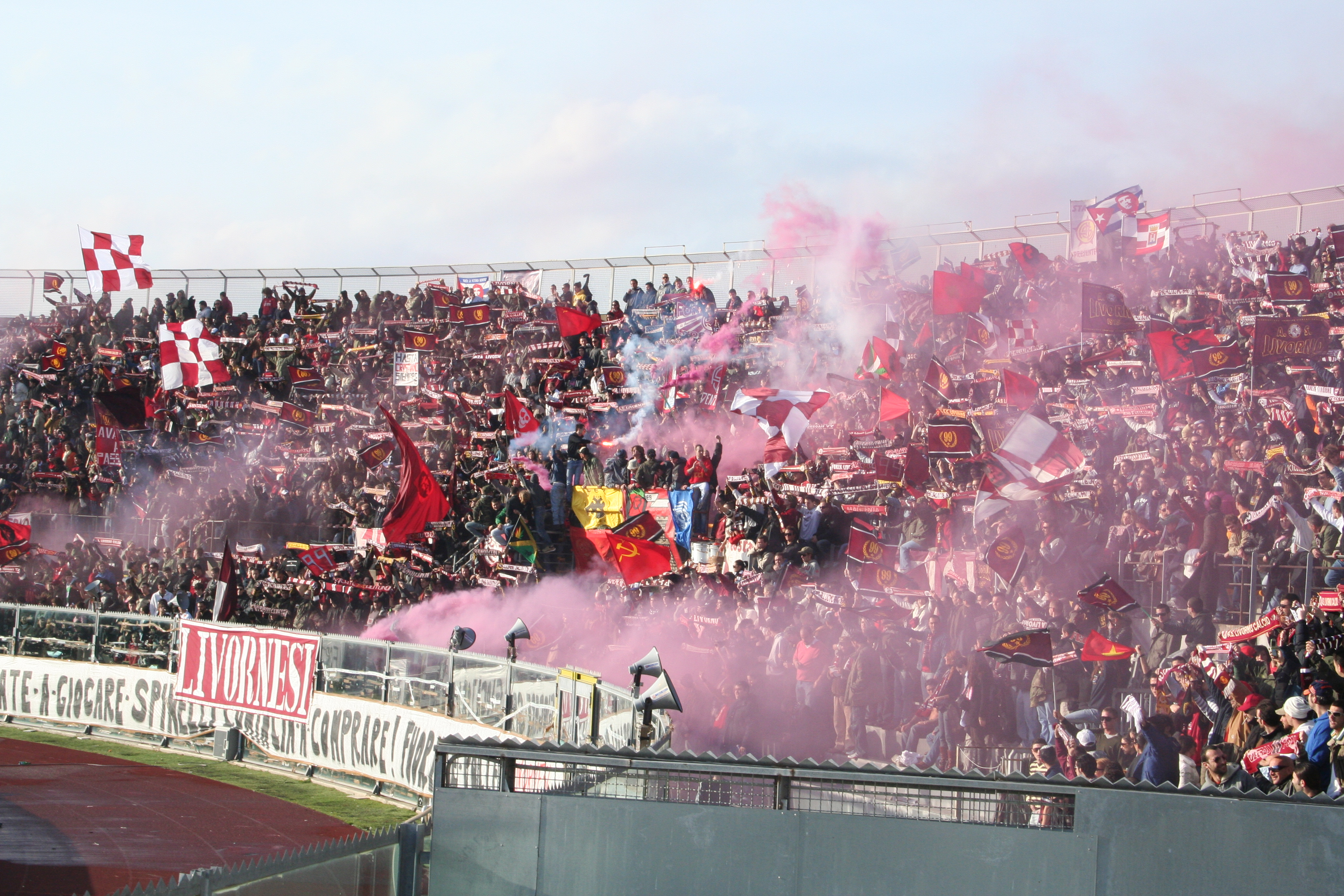
Livorno supporters in 2007.

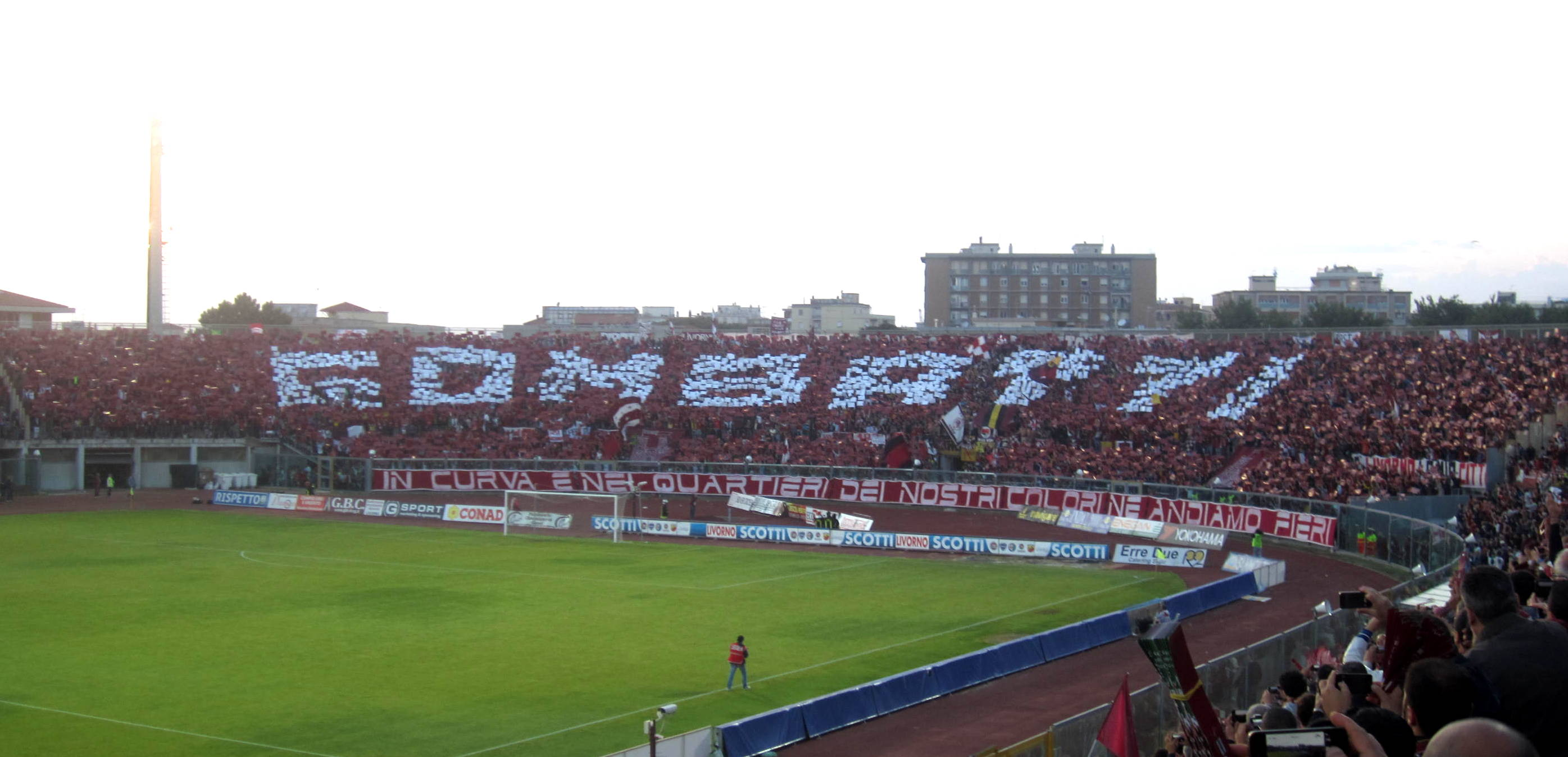
Livorno supporters in 2013.

Founded on 15 February 1915, the club ended the Italian Football Championship 1919–20 in second place, losing the final to Internazionale. One year later, they were defeated in the semi-final by arch-rivals Pisa. In 1933, the club moved to the current stadium, originally named after Edda Ciano Mussolini, daughter of fascist dictator Benito Mussolini. Livorno was one of the original Serie A teams. They played at top level during periods of 1929–31, 1933–35 and 1937–39. Successively, Livorno ended as Serie A runners-up in the 1942–43 season, finishing after Torino. Livorno left Serie A in 1949 after seven consecutive seasons. They were relegated to Serie C soon after (1951–52 season), making a return to Serie B in 1955 for a single season and again from 1964 to 1972. They were relegated to Serie C2 in 1982–83 and played again in the third level between 1984 and 1989. The club was then canceled in 1991, being forced to start from Eccellenza; two consecutive promotions led the team back to Serie C2. The club was promoted to Serie C1 in 1997 and was acquired by Aldo Spinelli two years later. Under the new property, Livorno returned to Serie B in 2001.

Livorno was promoted to Serie A after finishing third in the Serie B 2003–04, one of six clubs to be promoted that season. It had been 55 years since Livorno's last season in the top flight, and as a result of this, most were predicting an instant return to Serie B for the club. The first match in the major league was attended by Italian President Carlo Azeglio Ciampi, a Livorno citizen and team supporter in his childhood. There were spells of struggle during the season, but there were many more good performances shown, and Livorno finished a surprise and creditable ninth place in the league for the Serie A 2004–05, also thanks to goals by striker Cristiano Lucarelli, who won the Serie A top scorer award that season, outscoring even the likes of Andriy Shevchenko and Adriano.

The Serie A 2005–06 saw Livorno in sixth place after the first half of the season the team, being involved for qualification to the next UEFA Cup. Shortly after, Roberto Donadoni announced his resignation after having been criticized by club's chairman Aldo Spinelli. Donadoni was replaced by veteran coach Carlo Mazzone, who was only able to save a UEFA Cup place due to the expulsion of three teams from Europe in the Calciopoli scandal. Mazzone then saw his team suffer a run of seven straight defeats. In May 2006, Daniele Arrigoni was appointed the new coach for the next season.

In the Serie A 2006–07 season, Livorno took part in the UEFA Cup for the first time. The Tuscan side was drawn to face the Austrian team SV Pasching in the first round, beating them comfortably 3–0 on aggregate. They thus qualified for the group stages being drawn in Group A, along with Rangers, Auxerre, FK Partizan, and Maccabi Haifa. After a home loss to Rangers (2–3) and two 1–1 draws against Partizan in Belgrade (where goalkeeper Marco Amelia scored in the 87th minute) and Maccabi (in Livorno), the Tuscan side gained a 1–0 victory over Auxerre in the last game played in France, thus earning a spot in the Round of 32 of the competition. However, the Spanish team Espanyol knocked out Livorno from the UEFA Cup by winning 4–1 on aggregate.

After day 19 of the Serie A, Arrigoni was sacked by chairman Spinelli, but his position was kept due to the strong opposition by the team. His dismissal was, however, only delayed, as Arrigoni was eventually fired on 21 March 2007, and replaced by Fernando Orsi, who managed to keep the team away from the relegation battle. For the 2007–08 campaign, Orsi was confirmed as head coach and a number of notable signings such as Francesco Tavano, Diego Tristan and Vikash Dhorasoo were finalised, but also the transfer of Lucarelli to Ukrainian club Shakhtar Donetsk. The club, however, did not start well, making a mere two points in the first seven matches, and Orsi was sacked on 9 October and replaced by Giancarlo Camolese. Despite showing some positive signals at the beginning, Livorno found himself again at the bottom of league table. On 28 April 2008, Camolese was fired as Orsi was re-appointed, but in the penultimate day of the season, the team could not avoid relegation, due to a 1–0 home defeat against Torino. They finished last in the Serie A standings of the 2007–08 season. Thus, being relegated to Serie B. They finished Serie B as the third place team in 2008–09 season and returned to Serie A after winning promotion play-offs after defeating successively Grosseto with a 4–3 aggregate score and Brescia with a 5–2 aggregate score. However, this return was short-lived and one season later they relegated again to Serie B after finishing last. Livorno were promoted again after they beat Empoli 2–1 on aggregate to get the Serie A promotion.

In the 2019–20 season of Serie B, Livorno ended up last, leading them to be relegated to Serie C. In the 2020–21 Serie C season, Livorno finished in last place with 29 points following a five-point deduction due to failure to pay player wages on time, and was relegated to Serie D. However, due to the club's bankruptcy, they could not pay the admission fee for Serie D and disbanded.

The club joined the Eccellenza Toscana for the 2021–22 season under the new denomination of Unione Sportiva Livorno 1915 and the ownership of former Prato chairman Paolo Toccafondi. In the 2021–22 season, Livorno finished first in Group B of the Eccellenza Toscana, but were narrowly defeated in the national playoffs by S.S.D. Pomezia Calcio. However, Livorno were later admitted back to Serie D in place of Figline, who were barred from promotion after throwing a game against Tau Calcio Altopascio which influenced the promotion tournament seeding. In their first Serie D season, Livorno finished 5th of 18 teams in Group E. They would marginally improve the next season by finishing 4th, before being the first Italian side to secure promotion from the 2024–25 season of Serie D, having clinched Group E four matches early.

== Coaching staff ==
Position	Name	Nationality
Head coach	Cristiano Lucarelli	Italy
Assistant coach	Richard Vanigli	Italy
Goalkeeper coach	Pietro Spinosa	Italy
Sporting director	Egidio Bicchierai	Italy
Physiotherapist	Fabiano Giannini	Italy

== Players ==
=== Current squad ===
As of 12 September 2026

Note: Flags indicate national team as defined under FIFA eligibility rules; some limited exceptions apply. Players may hold more than one non-FIFA nationality.

No.	Pos.	Nation	Player
1	GK	ITA	Filippo Tani
2	DF	ITA	Davide Gentile
3	MF	ITA	Francesco Menarini
4	DF	ITA	Matteo Bachini
5	MF	ITA	Andrea Bacciardi
6	DF	CIV	Koffi Djidji
7	MF	ITA	Mattia Aramu
8	MF	ITA	Diego Peralta
9	FW	ITA	Giacomo Gabbiani (on loan from Cremonese)
11	MF	ITA	Lorenzo Malagrida
13	FW	ITA	Samuel Di Carmine
14	FW	ITA	Tommaso Mancini (on loan from Juventus)
17	MF	ITA	Tommaso Arrigoni (on loan from Cesena)
18	FW	ITA	Gregorio Morachioli (on loan from Juve Stabia)

No.	Pos.	Nation	Player
19	DF	ITA	Samuele Regazzetti
21	FW	ITA	Manuele Malotti
22	GK	MDA	Danko Ciobanu
23	FW	ITA	Jacopo Marinari
24	MF	ITA	Chaihane Badoro
28	DF	ITA	Alessio Rizza
32	MF	SUI	Nicolas Haas
34	DF	ALB	Frédéric Veseli
44	MF	ITA	Luca Bonassi
53	DF	ITA	Tommaso Pittino (on loan from Genoa)
54	DF	ITA	Nicola Falasco
77	MF	ITA	Jesus Christ Mawete
90	MF	ITA	Luca Alberto Calabrò
91	GK	ESP	Miguel Ángel Martínez

== Club identity and supporters ==
No Serie A club's supporters wear their political allegiance more boldly than Livorno's, whose leanings are strongly to the left, the city of Livorno being the birthplace of Italy's Communist party.

— The National

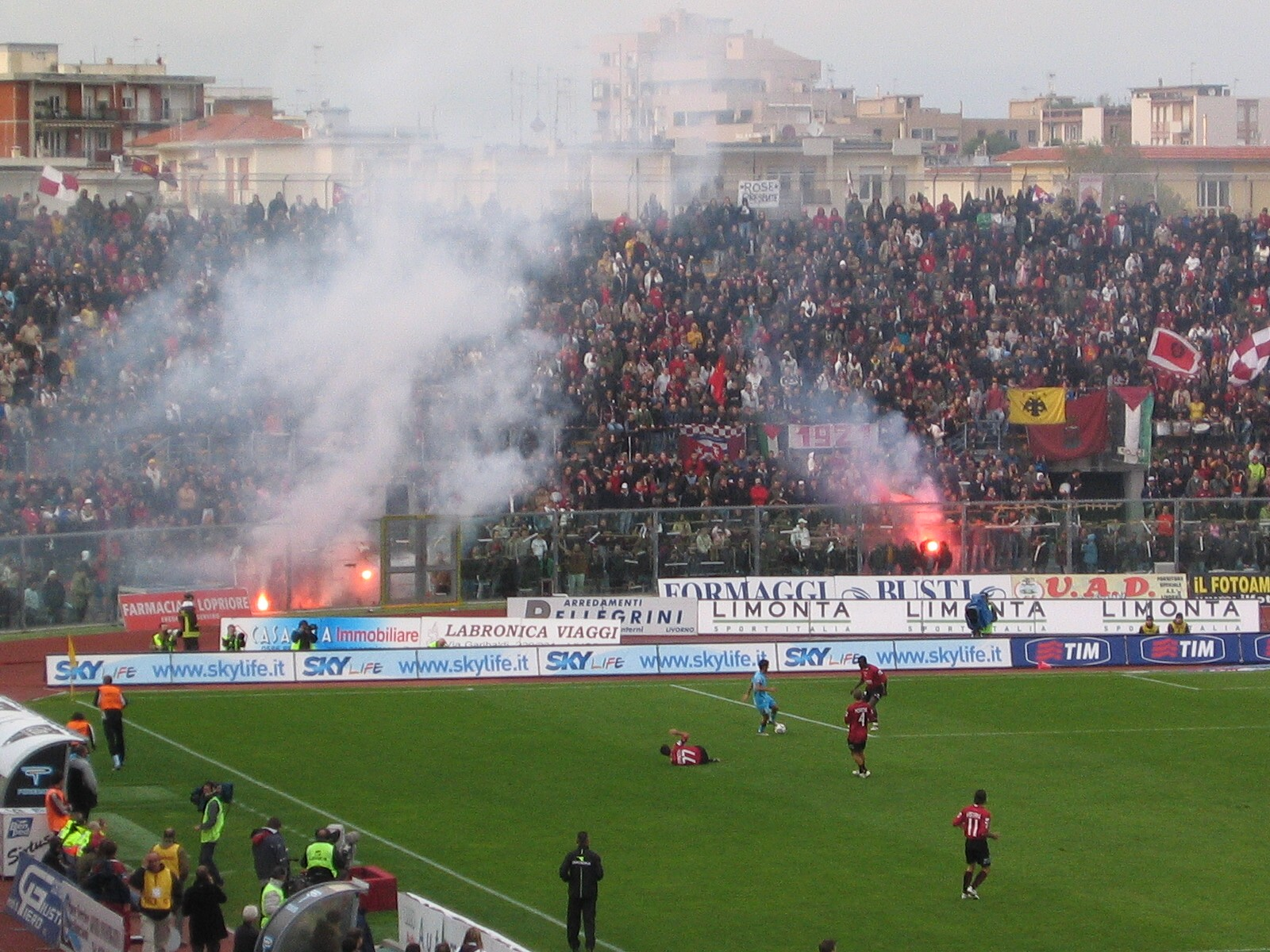
AS Livorno supporters during a match against Udinese

Livorno's supporters are well known for their left-wing politics. The origins of the club's association with left-wing politics can be traced to Livorno being the birthplace of the Italian Communist Party in 1921. Livorno's ultra group Brigate Autonome Livornesi (BAL), founded in 1999, exemplified this. BAL celebrated events such as Joseph Stalin's birthday in the stands and expressed support for working-class causes, anti-fascism, and anti-capitalism. BAL were involved in confrontations with Milan fans and made critical remarks about Silvio Berlusconi, resulting in multiple banning orders. BAL's leader, former boxer Lenny Bottai, was reported to have attacked Sampdoria fans alone. BAL dissolved in 2003 following continued bans on its members.

Cristiano Lucarelli, Livorno's most notable player and a committed Communist, is closely tied to the club's political identity. Raised in a Livorno housing project, he played for several clubs before returning to his hometown team. In 1997, during an Italy under-21 match at Livorno's stadium, he revealed a Che Guevara t-shirt after scoring, which led to his exclusion from the senior national team for many years. Lucarelli eventually joined Livorno, taking a significant pay cut to play for the club he supported. He chose the No. 99 shirt to honour the year the club's left-wing ultra group Brigate Autonome Livornesi was founded. His performance helped Livorno gain promotion to Serie A, and he became the league's top scorer the following season. Despite earlier exclusion, Lucarelli later earned six senior caps for Italy, scoring three goals. Lucarelli helped cement the left-wing identity of Livorno.

Livorno's ideological orientation has led to clashes with clubs associated with right-wing politics, especially those of Lazio and Verona. Former Lazio striker Paolo Di Canio once made a Roman salute to his own fans during a match against Livorno, when tensions were running high between the two clubs' ultra groups.

Since 2005, a group of migrant Livorno supporters resident in northern Europe have styled themselves Partigiani Livornesi Scandinavia (transl. Livornian partisans of Scandinavia). A so-called "triangle of brotherhood" has developed between the most heavily supported left-wing fan clubs of Marseille, Livorno, and AEK Athens, namely between Commando Ultras 84, Brigate Autonome Livornesi 99, and Original 21. Their connection is mostly an ideological one. They also have a connection with Adana Demirspor (Şimşekler) and Celtic.

== In Europe ==
=== UEFA Cup ===
Season	Round	Club	Home	Away	Aggregate	Reference
2006–07	First round	(Austria) Pasching	2–0	1–0	3–0	
2006–07	Group A	(Scotland) Rangers	2–3	—N/a	3rd	
2006–07	Group A	(Serbia) Partizan	—N/a	1–1	3rd	
2006–07	Group A	(Israel) Maccabi Haifa	1–1	—N/a	3rd	
2006–07	Group A	(France) Auxerre	—N/a	1–0	3rd	
2006–07	Round of 32	(Spain) Espanyol	1–2	0–2	1–4	

== Honours ==
- Serie A
  - Runners-up (2): 1919–20, 1942–43
- Serie B
  - Winners (2): 1932–33, 1936–37
  - Runners-up (1): 1939–40
  - Other Promotions (3): 2003–04, 2008–09, 2012–13
- Serie C / Serie C1 / Lega Pro
  - Winners (3): 1963–64, 2001–02, 2017–18
  - Promotions (5): 1954–55, 1959–60, 1963–64, 2001–02, 2017–18
- Serie C2 / Lega Pro Seconda Divisione
  - Winners (1): 1983–84
  - Runners-up (1): 1995–96, 1996–97
  - Promotions (2): 1983–84, 1996–97
- Serie D
  - Winners (1): 2024–25
- Coppa Italia Serie C / Coppa Italia Lega Pro
  - Winners (1): 1986–87
  - Runners-up (1): 2001–02

== Divisional movements ==
Series	Years	Last	Promotions	Relegations
A	18	2013–14	-	▼7 (1931, 1935, 1939, 1949, 2008, 2010, 2014)
B	27	2019–20	▲6 (1933, 1937, 1940, 2004, 2009, 2013)	▼5 (1952, 1956, 1972, 2016, 2020)
C +C2	35 +7	2020–21	▲4 (1955, 1964, 2002, 2018) ▲2 (1984 C2, 1997 C2)	▼3 (1983 C1, 1989 C1, 2021✟) ▼1 (1991✟)
87 out of 92 years of professional football in Italy since 1929
D	3	2024–25	▲2 (1993, 2025)	never
E	2	2021–22	▲1 (1992, 2022)	never
