= Youssouph Cheikh Sylla =

Senegalese footballer

Personal information
- Date of birth: 20 February 1998 (age 28)
- Place of birth: Mbacké, Senegal
- Height: 1.96 m (6 ft 5 in)
- Position: Forward

Team information
- Current team: Latina
- Number: 9

Youth career
- –2016: Parma

Senior career*
Years	Team	Apps	(Gls)
2016–2017	Colorno	28	(14)
2017–2020	Piacenza	35	(2)
2017–2018	→ Vigor Carpaneto (loan)	19	(12)
2020–2021	Gozzano	34	(19)
2021–2023	Pordenone	14	(0)
2021	→ Siena (loan)	0	(0)
2022–2023	→ Alessandria (loan)	22	(5)
2023–2024	Vis Pesaro	18	(5)
2024–2025	Perugia	26	(4)
2025	Monopoli	9	(0)
2025–2026	Foggia	13	(1)
2026–	Latina	10	(1)
- * Club domestic league appearances and goals as of 1 May 2026

Youssouph Cheikh Sylla (born 20 February 1998) is a Senegalese professional footballer who plays as a forward for Serie C Group B club Latina. He played all of his career so far in Italy, advancing from the fifth tier to the second.

== Career ==
He started his senior career in the fifth and fourth tier (Eccellenza and Serie D).

He made his professional Serie C debut for Piacenza on 22 September 2018, against Pontedera.

On 5 August 2021, he signed a three-year contract with Serie B club Pordenone. On 18 August 2021, Pordenone loaned him to Serie C club Siena. However, the Italian Football Federation did not approve the loan and he returned to Pordenone on 28 August.

He made his Serie B debut for Pordenone on 18 September 2021, in a game against Cittadella.

On 31 August 2022, Sylla was loaned to Alessandria, with an option to buy.

On 20 July 2023, Sylla signed a two-year contract with Vis Pesaro.
