= SSD San Nicolò Notaresco =

Italian football club

Coordinates: 39.243452°N 9.192163°E

Notaresco
- Full name: Associazione Sportiva Dilettantistica Notaresco Calcio 1924 S.r.l.
- Nicknames: Rossoblù (red and blues); Il Toro (the bull); Lotariani (lothairians)
- Founded: 1924; 2018 (relocation)
- Ground: Stadio Comunale Vincenzo Savini, Notaresco, Italy
- Capacity: 2,000
- President: Luigi Di Battista
- Manager: Francesco Mazzocchetti
- League: Serie D
- 2025–26: Serie D/F, 5th (qualified for wild card play-off)
Home colours	Away colours

A.S.D. Notaresco Calcio 1924 or simply Notaresco is an Italian association football club. It is based in Notaresco, Teramo, Abruzzo. The club competes in Serie D.

== History ==
The club was founded in 1924 as A.S. Notaresco Calcio. It mainly played in Eccellenza Abruzzo and Promozione, but on several occasions such as the 2002/2003 season and the 2006/2007 season, it came close to getting promotion to Serie D. Notaresco Calcio won the Coppa Dilettanti Abruzzo two times, in 1999 and in 2001. After the 2016/2017 season, it was relegated to Prima Categoria, but the club didn't subscribe for the next season.

In 2018, in accordance with Notaresco's mayor (Diego Di Bonaventura), the club San Nicolò Calcio (founded in 1968 as “A.C. San Nicolò”, in the 2010–11 season won the Eccellenza Abruzzo, obtaining promotion to Serie D. Its ascent started in Prima Categoria in the 2002–03 season) and was relocated to Notaresco and acquired the old club’s sport title; changing its name to S.N. Notaresco.

In 2022, the club rechanged its name to Notaresco Calcio 1924, its original name.

== Colors and badge ==
The team's color are always been red and blue since 1924. The team's mascot is a bull and in its logo there's also a tower and a crown above it, matching the Notaresco municipality coat of arms.
