= 2023–24 Catania FC season =

Catania FC
2023–24 season
- Manager: Luca Tabbiani (until 5 November); Michele Zeoli (caretaker, 6–14 November); Cristiano Lucarelli (from 14 November to 7 March); Michele Zeoli (from 8 March)
- Stadium: Stadio Angelo Massimino
- Serie C: 13th
- Promotion play-offs: National phase second round
- Coppa Italia Serie C: Winners
- Top goalscorer: League: Samuel Di Carmine (8); All: Samuel Di Carmine (8)
- Highest home attendance: 19,842 vs Rimini
- Lowest home attendance: 0 vs Sorrento
- Average home league attendance: 15,175
- Biggest win: Casertana 0–4 Catania; Benevento 0–4 Catania; Catania 4–0 Brindisi
- Biggest defeat: Crotone 3–0 Catania; Avellino 5–2 Catania
Home colours	Away colours	Third colours

The 2023–24 season was Catania FC's 95th season in existence and second consecutive season in the Serie C. They also competed in the Coppa Italia Serie C.

== Players ==
=== First-team squad ===
As of 1 February 2024

Note: Flags indicate national team as defined under FIFA eligibility rules; some limited exceptions apply. Players may hold more than one non-FIFA nationality.

No.	Pos.	Nation	Player
1	GK	LAT	Klāvs Bethers
2	DF	ARG	Marcos Curado
3	DF	ALB	Kevin Haveri (on loan from Torino)
5	DF	ITA	Francesco Rapisarda
6	MF	ALB	Emanuele Ndoj
7	MF	COL	Andrés Tello
8	MF	ITA	Stefano Sturaro
9	FW	ITA	Rocco Costantino
10	FW	ITA	Samuel Di Carmine
11	DF	ITA	Antonio Mazzotta
13	DF	ITA	Devid Eugene Bouah
14	DF	CRO	Ivan Kontek
15	DF	ITA	Tommaso Silvestri
16	MF	ITA	Alessandro Quaini
18	MF	ITA	Giuseppe Rizzo (vice-captain)

No.	Pos.	Nation	Player
19	MF	ITA	Diego Peralta
22	GK	ITA	Jacopo Furlan
23	MF	GHA	Nana Welbeck
26	DF	ITA	Filippo Lorenzini
27	DF	ITA	Alessio Castellini
28	DF	ITA	Alessandro Celli
30	FW	ITA	Emanuele Cicerelli
31	FW	ITA	Marco Chiarella
32	FW	ITA	Cosimo Chiricò
33	MF	ITA	Roberto Zammarini
46	DF	ITA	Salvatore Monaco
77	FW	ITA	Davide Marsura
90	FW	ITA	Pietro Cianci
95	GK	ITA	Marco Albertoni

== Transfers ==
=== In ===
Pos.	Player	Transferred from	Fee	Date	Source
MF	(Italy) Cosimo Chiricò	(Italy) Crotone	€1k	14 July 2023	
MF	(Italy) Roberto Zammarini	(Italy) Pordenone	Free	18 July 2023	
FW	(Italy) Marco Chiarella	(Italy) Pescara	Free	18 July 2023	
FW	(Italy) Samuel Di Carmine	(Italy) Perugia	Free	21 July 2023	
MF	(Italy) Michele Rocca	(Italy) Novara	Free	21 July 2023	
DF	(Italy) Antonio Mazzotta	(Italy) Bari	Free	21 July 2023	
MF	(Italy) Riccardo Ladinetti	(Italy) Pontedera	Free	22 July 2023	
FW	(Serbia) Miloš Bočić	(Italy) Pescara	Free	22 July 2023	
GK	(Italy) Alessandro Livieri	(Italy) Pisa	Loan	5 August 2023	
DF	(Italy) Mattia Maffei	(Italy) Cavese	€50k	8 August 2023	
MF	(Italy) Davide Marsura	(Italy) Ascoli	Free	9 August 2023	
FW	(Australia) Gabriel Popovic	(Croatia) Rudeš		10 August 2023	
DF	(Argentina) Marcos Curado	(Italy) Perugia	Free	11 August 2023	
MF	(Italy) Alessandro Quaini	(Italy) Fiorenzuola	€50k	22 August 2023	
GK	(Latvia) Klāvs Bethers	(Italy) Piacenza	Free	1 September 2023	
DF	(Italy) Tommaso Silvestri	(Italy) Modena		1 September 2023	
MF	(Italy) Francesco Deli	(Italy) Pordenone	Free	4 September 2023	
DF	(Italy) Devid Eugene Bouah	(Italy) Reggio Calabria	Free	13 September 2023	

=== Out ===
Pos.	Player	Transferred to	Fee	Date	Source

== Pre-season and friendlies ==
Win Draw Loss Fixtures

The club started their pre-season on 23 July with a retreat in Zafferana Etnea.

9 August 2023 Friendly	Catania (Italy)	9–1	(Italy) Calatabiano
--:-- CEST (UTC+2)		Report

12 August 2023 Friendly	Catania (Italy)	0–0	(Italy) Paternò
--:-- CEST (UTC+2)		Report

== Competitions ==
=== Overall record ===
Competition	First match	Last match	Starting round	Final position	Record							
Competition	First match	Last match	Starting round	Final position	Pld	W	D	L	GF	GA	GD	Win %
Serie C	1 September 2023	28 April 2024	Matchday 1	13th	38	12	9	17	39	38	+1	31.58
Promotion play-offs	14 May 2024	25 May 2024	National phase first round	National phase second round	4	2	0	2	3	3	+0	50.00
Coppa Italia Serie C	4 October 2023	2 April 2024	First round	Winners	8	5	1	2	17	11	+6	62.50
Total					50	19	10	21	59	52	+7	38.00

Source: Soccerway

=== Serie C ===
==== League table ====
Pos	Team	Pld	W	D	L	GF	GA	GD	Pts	Qualification
11	Foggia	38	13	9	16	40	44	−4	48 (Note: Foggia are ahead of Sorrento on overall goal difference: Foggia -4, Sorrento -8.)	
12	Sorrento	38	13	9	16	39	47	−8	48	
13	Catania	38	12	9	17	39	38	+1	45 (Note: Catania are ahead of Messina on overall goal difference: Catania +1, Messina -8.)	National play-offs 1st round (Note: Catania qualify for the national play-offs first round by winning the Coppa Italia Serie C.)
14	Messina	38	11	12	15	41	49	−8	45	
15	Turris	38	11	11	16	46	57	−11	44	

Updated to match(es) played on 27 April 2024. Source: Lega Pro, Soccerway (in English)
Rules for classification: 1) Points; 2) Head-to-head points; 3) Head-to-head goal difference; 4) Goal difference; 5) Goals scored; 6) Lower goals against; 7) Wins; 8) Lower losses; 9) Away wins; 10) Lower home losses.
(Note: Head-to-head record is used only after all the matches between the teams in question have been played)

==== Results summary ====
Overall								Home						Away					
Pld	W	D	L	GF	GA	GD	Pts	W	D	L	GF	GA	GD	W	D	L	GF	GA	GD
38	12	9	17	39	38	+1	45	8	6	5	21	15	+6	4	3	12	18	23	−5

Source: Worldfootball

==== Results by round ====
Round	1	2	3	4	5	6	7	8	9	10	11	12	13	14	15	16	17	18	19	20
Ground	H	A	H	A	H	A	H	A	H	A	H	A	A	H	A	H	A	H	A	A
Result	L	W	W	D	L	W	D	L	W	D	L	L	L	W	W	D	L	L	W	
Position	14	6	5	6	10	7	5	10	7	9	11	12	13	12	10	9	11			

Source: Worldfootball
A = Away; H = Home; W = Win; D = Draw; L = Loss

==== Matches ====
The league fixtures were unveiled on 7 August 2023.

1 September 2023 1	Catania	0–1	Crotone	Catania
19:45 CEST (UTC+2)			Tribuzzi 66'	Stadium: Stadio Angelo Massimino; Referee: Simone Galipò

17 September 2023 3	Catania	2–0	Picerno	Catania
20:45 CEST (UTC+2)	Di Carmine 31', 64'			Stadium: Stadio Angelo Massimino; Referee: Michele Delrio

21 September 2023 4	Monopoli	0–0	Catania	Monopoli
20:45 CEST (UTC+2)				Stadium: Stadio Vito Simone Veneziani; Referee: Gianluca Grasso

25 September 2023 5	Catania	0–2	Foggia	Catania
20:45 CEST (UTC+2)			Marino 73'; Tonin 90+5'	Stadium: Stadio Angelo Massimino; Referee: Mario Perri

1 October 2023 6	Casertana	0–4	Catania	Caserta
14:00 CEST (UTC+2)			Chiricò 7', 56'; Di Carmine 25', 45'	Stadium: Stadio Alberto Pinto; Referee: Valerio Crezzini

8 October 2023 7	Catania	1–1	Latina	Catania
16:15 CEST (UTC+2)	Chiricò 73'		Mastroianni 18'	Stadium: Stadio Angelo Massimino; Referee: Gabriele Sacchi

15 October 2023 8	Juve Stabia	1–0	Catania	Castellammare di Stabia
14:00 CEST (UTC+2)	Meli 31'		Silvestri (yellow card) 60' (yellow-red card) 90'	Stadium: Stadio Romeo Menti; Referee: Mattia Caldera

22 October 2023 9	Catania	1–0	Taranto	Catania
16:15 CEST (UTC+2)	Di Carmine 66'			Stadium: Stadio Angelo Massimino; Referee: Eugenio Scarpa

25 October 2023 10	Monterosi	1–1	Catania	Teramo
18:30 CEST (UTC+2)	Palazzino 90+3'		Giordani 41' (o.g.)	Stadium: Stadio Gaetano Bonolis; Referee: Erminio Cerbasi

29 October 2023 11	Catania	0–2	Avellino	Catania
14:00 CET (UTC+1)	Bočić (yellow card) 33'; Quaini (yellow card) 49'; Curado (yellow card) 52'; Ladinetti (yellow card) 59'; Sarao (yellow card) 74'; Rocca (yellow card) 81'		Marconi 10'; Pezzella (yellow card) 11'; Sannipoli (yellow card) 25'; Armellino (yellow card) 57'; Gori 70'	Stadium: Stadio Angelo Massimino; Referee: Emanuele Frascaro

1 November 2023 2	Brindisi	0–2	Catania	Brindisi
16:15 CET (UTC+1)			Sarao 71'; Bočić 75'	Stadium: Stadio Franco Fanuzzi; Referee: Mattia Ubaldi

5 November 2023 12	Potenza	1–0	Catania	Potenza
14:00 CET (UTC+1)	Caturano 35'			Stadium: Stadio Alfredo Viviani; Referee: Domenico Leone

12 November 2023 13	Audace Cerignola	1–0	Catania	Cerignola
18:30 CET (UTC+1)	Malcore 60'			Stadium: Stadio Domenico Monterisi; Referee: Andrea Ancora

18 November 2023 14	Catania	2–1	Turris	Catania
14:00 CET (UTC+1)	Curado 39'; Bouah 90+7'		De Felice 75'	Stadium: Stadio Angelo Massimino; Referee: Valerio Vogliacco

26 November 2023 15	Giugliano	0–1	Catania	Giugliano in Campania
16:15 CET (UTC+1)			Di Carmine 80'	Stadium: Stadio Alberto De Cristofaro; Referee: Dario Di Francesco

3 December 2023 16	Catania	1–1	Virtus Francavilla	Catania
20:45 CET (UTC+1)	De Luca 76'		Artistico 22'	Stadium: Stadio Angelo Massimino; Referee: Giuseppe Vingo

9 December 2023 17	Messina	1–0	Catania	Messina
20:45 CET (UTC+1)	Emmausso 71'			Stadium: Stadio San Filippo; Referee: Daniele Virgilio

18 December 2023 18	Catania	0–1	Sorrento	Catania
20:45 CET (UTC+1)	Lorenzini (yellow card) 26'; Quaini (yellow card) 53'; Popovic (yellow card) 90+2'		Loreto (yellow card) 30'; De Francesco 42'; Ravasio (yellow card) 90+6'	Stadium: Stadio Angelo Massimino; Attendance: 0 Referee: Matteo Canci
Note: Behind closed doors as punishment for the events that occurred during the Coppa Italia Serie C quarter-final match against Pescara.

23 December 2023 19	Benevento	0–4	Catania	Benevento
18:30 CET (UTC+1)	Karić (yellow card) 35' (yellow-red card) 36'; Talia (yellow card) 49' (yellow-red card) 60'; Improta (yellow card) 66'		Chiricò 39' (pen.), 69'; Zammarini 46'; Deli 79'	Stadium: Stadio Ciro Vigorito; Referee: Ermes Fabrizio Cavaliere

7 January 2024 20	Crotone	3–0	Catania	Crotone
18:30 CET (UTC+1)				Stadium: Stadio Ezio Scida

13 January 2024 21	Catania	4–0	Brindisi	Catania
				Stadium: Stadio Angelo Massimino

28 January 2024 23	Catania	1–1	Monopoli	Catania
				Stadium: Stadio Angelo Massimino

2 February 2024 24	Foggia	1–1	Catania	Foggia
				Stadium: Stadio Pino Zaccheria

6 February 2024 22	Picerno	1–0	Catania	Picerno
14:00				Stadium: Stadio Donato Curcio

11 February 2024 25	Catania	0–0	Casertana	Catania
				Stadium: Stadio Angelo Massimino

14 February 2024 26	Latina	1–0	Catania	Latina
				Stadium: Stadio Domenico Francioni

18 February 2024 27	Catania	2–0	Juve Stabia	Catania
				Stadium: Stadio Angelo Massimino

24 February 2024 28	Taranto	1–0	Catania	Taranto
				Stadium: Stadio Erasmo Iacovone

3 March 2024 29	Catania	1–1	Monterosi	Catania
				Stadium: Stadio Angelo Massimino

6 March 2024 30	Avellino	5–2	Catania	Avellino
				Stadium: Stadio Partenio-Adriano Lombardi

10 March 2024 31	Catania	0–0	Potenza	Catania
16:45				Stadium: Stadio Angelo Massimino

15 March 2024 32	Catania	2–1	Audace Cerignola	Catania
20:45				Stadium: Stadio Angelo Massimino

24 March 2024 33	Turris	2–1	Catania	Torre del Greco
14:00

28 March 2024 34	Catania	2–3	Giugliano	Catania
20:45				Stadium: Stadio Angelo Massimino

7 April 2024 35	Virtus Francavilla	1–0	Catania	Francavilla Fontana
18:30				Stadium: Stadio Giovanni Paolo II

14 April 2024 36	Catania	1–0	Messina	Catania
20:45	Di Carmine 25' (pen.)			Stadium: Stadio Angelo Massimino; Referee: Michele Delrio

21 April 2024 37	Sorrento	3–2	Catania	Sorrento
20:00	Loreto 49'; Cuccurullo 71'; Ravasio 83'		Cianci 86', 90'	Stadium: Stadio Italia; Referee: Leonardo Mastrodomenico

27 April 2024 38	Catania	1–0	Benevento	Catania
18:30	Cianci 45+1'			Stadium: Stadio Angelo Massimino; Referee: Emanuele Frascaro

==== Promotion play-offs ====
===== National phase first round =====
14 May 2024 First leg	Atalanta U23	0–1	Catania	Caravaggio
20:30 CEST (UTC+2)			Bouah 84'	Stadium: Stadio Comunale; Referee: Leonardo Mastrodomenico

18 May 2024 Second leg	Catania	0–1	Atalanta U23	Catania
20:30 CEST (UTC+2)			Diao 90+2'	Stadium: Stadio Angelo Massimino; Referee: Valerio Crezzini

Catania advanced by winning the Coppa Italia Serie C.

===== National phase second round =====
21 May 2024 First leg	Catania	1–0	Avellino	Catania
20:30 CEST (UTC+2)	Cianci 71'	Report		Stadium: Stadio Angelo Massimino; Referee: Valerio Crezzini

25 May 2024 Second leg	Avellino	2–1 (2–2 agg.)	Catania	Avellino
20:30 CEST (UTC+2)	Liotti 52'; D'Ausilio 83'	Report	Cianci 10'	Stadium: Stadio Partenio-Adriano Lombardi; Referee: Andrea Bordin

Avellino advanced as a seeded team.

=== Coppa Italia Serie C ===
4 October 2023 First round	Catania	2–1	Messina	Catania
20:45 CEST (UTC+2)	Bočić 54'; Sarao 60'		Pacciardi 86'	Stadium: Stadio Angelo Massimino; Referee: Luca De Angeli di Milano

8 November 2023 Second round	Catania	3–2	Picerno	Catania
20:45 CET (UTC+1)	Castellini 7'; Deli (penalty missed) 19', 19', 81'		Ciko 53'; Vitali 62'	Stadium: Stadio Angelo Massimino; Referee: Giuseppe Rispoli

29 November 2023 Round of 16	Catania	3–3 (a.e.t.) (3–2 p)	Crotone	Catania
18:30 CET (UTC+1)	De Luca 53'; Dubickas 59'; Di Carmine 87' (pen.)		Tribuzzi 7'; Tumminello 57'; Bruzzaniti 70'	Stadium: Stadio Angelo Massimino; Referee: Gianluca Grasso

13 December 2023 Quarter-finals	Catania	2–0	Pescara	Catania
20:30 CET (UTC+1)	Castellini 67'; Zammarini 90+1'			Stadium: Stadio Angelo Massimino; Referee: Valerio Crezzini

24 January 2024 Semi-finals; First leg	Rimini	1–0	Catania	Rimini
20:30 CET (UTC+1)	Lamesta 38'			Stadium: Stadio Romeo Neri; Referee: Domenico Mirabella

28 February 2024 Semi-finals; Second leg	Catania	2–0	Rimini	Catania
20:30 CET (UTC+1)				Stadium: Stadio Angelo Massimino; Referee: Simone Galipo

19 March 2024 Final; First leg	Padova	2–1	Catania	Padua
CET (UTC+1)				Stadium: Stadio Euganeo

2 April 2024 Final; Second leg	Catania	4–2 (a.e.t.)	Padova	Catania
CEST (UTC+2)				Stadium: Stadio Angelo Massimino
