= 2025–26 Catania FC season =

Italian football club season 2025-26

Catania FC
2025–26 season
- Manager: Domenico Toscano
- Stadium: Stadio Angelo Massimino
- Serie C Group C: 2nd
- Coppa Italia Serie C: First round
- Highest home attendance: 17,800 vs Foggia
- Lowest home attendance: 17,495 vs Monopoli
- Biggest win: Catania 6–0 Foggia
- Biggest defeat: Crotone 1–0 Catania

The 2025–26 season is the 97th in the history of Catania Football Club and the club's third consecutive season in Serie C. In addition to the domestic league, Catania competed in the Coppa Italia Serie C. The season began on 17 August 2025.

== Squad ==
=== Transfers In ===
Pos.	Player	Transferred from	Fee	Date	Source
FW	(Italy) Pietro Cianci	(Italy) Ternana	Loan return	30 June 2025	
MF	(Colombia) Andrés Tello	(Italy) Salernitana	Loan return	30 June 2025	
FW	(Australia) Gabriel Popovic	(Italy) Puteolana	Loan return	30 June 2025	
FW	(Serbia) Miloš Bočić	(Italy) Latina	Loan return	30 June 2025	
MF	(Italy) Emanuele Cicerelli	(Italy) Ternana	Loan return	30 June 2025	
DF	(Italy) Tommaso Silvestri	(Italy) Triestina	Loan return	30 June 2025	
FW	(Italy) Marco Chiarella	(Italy) Messina	Loan return	30 June 2025	
MF	(Argentina) Diego Peralta	(Italy) Trento	Loan return	30 June 2025	
MF	(Italy) Giulio Frisenna	(Italy) Messina	Loan return	30 June 2025	
FW	(Italy) Filippo D'Andrea	(Italy) Audace Cerignola	Loan return	30 June 2025	
GK	(Lithuania) Klaidas Laukžemis	(Italy) Ancona	Loan return	30 June 2025	
MF	(Italy) Davide Marsura	(Italy) Ascoli	Loan return	30 June 2025	
DF	(Argentina) Tiago Casasola	(Italy) Ternana	Free	12 July 2025	
FW	(Italy) Francesco Forte	(Italy) Ascoli	Loan	17 July 2025	
MF	(Italy) Andrea Corbari	(Italy) Virtus Entella	€200,000	1 August 2025	
DF	(Austria) Manuel Martic	(Italy) Lecco	Free	1 August 2025	
MF	(Italy) Salvatore Aloi	(Italy) Ternana	Free	9 August 2025	
FW	(Italy) Salvatore Caturano	(Italy) Potenza	Undisclosed	29 August 2025	
FW	(Italy) Simone Leonardi	(Italy) Sampdoria	Undisclosed	31 August 2025	

=== Transfers Out ===
Pos.	Player	Transferred to	Fee	Date	Source
FW	(Italy) Andrea De Paoli	(Italy) Giugliano	Loan return	30 June 2025	
DF	(Italy) Dario Del Fabro	(Italy) Arezzo	Loan return	30 June 2025	
MF	(Italy) Nicola Dalmonte	(Italy) Salernitana	Loan return	30 June 2025	
FW	(Italy) Pietro Cianci	(Italy) Ternana	€55,000	1 July 2025	
GK	(Lithuania) Marius Adamonis	(Italy) Südtirol	Undisclosed	1 July 2025	
DF	(Albania) Ertijon Gega	(Italy) Casarano	Undisclosed	3 July 2025	
FW	(Australia) Gabriel Popovic	(Australia) Perth Glory		15 July 2025	
GK	(Italy) Alessandro Farroni	(Italy) Siracusa	Free	19 July 2025	
FW	(Italy) Rocco Costantino	(Italy) ChievoVerona	Free	20 July 2025	
FW	(Serbia) Miloš Bočić	(Italy) Picerno	Loan	8 August 2025	
GK	(Lithuania) Klaidas Laukžemis	(Italy) Sora	Free	11 August 2025	
FW	(Italy) Federico D'Emilio	(Italy) Gela	Free	13 August 2025	
GK	(Italy) Damiano Butano	(Italy) Ghiviborgo	Loan	23 August 2025	
MF	(Italy) Davide Marsura		Contract terminated	25 August 2025	
MF	(Colombia) Andrés Tello	(Colombia) América de Cali	Free	28 August 2025	
FW	(Italy) Filippo D'Andrea	(Italy) Pineto	Loan	30 August 2025	
FW	(Italy) Marco Chiarella	(Italy) Recanatese	Loan	1 September 2025	
MF	(Italy) Giulio Frisenna	(Italy) Siracusa	Loan	1 September 2025	
MF	(Argentina) Diego Peralta	(Italy) Livorno	Contract terminated	1 September 2025	
FW	(Italy) Simone Leonardi	(Italy) Ternana	Loan	1 September 2025	
DF	(Italy) Tommaso Silvestri	(Italy) Triestina	Undisclosed	1 September 2025	

== Friendlies ==
10 August 2025	Catania	6–0	(Malta) Valletta	Catania
21:00	Di Gennaro 6'; Quaini 32'; Donnarumma 65'; Cicerelli 72'; D'Andrea 86'; Lunetta 90+5'	Report		Stadium: Stadio Angelo Massimino; Attendance: 3,334; Referee: Ferdinando Emanuel Toro

== Competitions ==
=== Overall record ===
Competition	First match	Last match	Starting round	Final position	Record							
Competition	First match	Last match	Starting round	Final position	Pld	W	D	L	GF	GA	GD	Win %
Serie C	24 August 2025	26 April 2026	Matchday 1		5	3	1	1	12	4	+8	60.00
Coppa Italia Serie C	17 August 2025		First round	First round	1	0	0	1	0	1	−1	0.00
Total					6	3	1	2	12	5	+7	50.00

Last updated: 20 September 2025
Source: Competitions

=== Serie C ===
Group C

==== Results summary ====
Overall								Home						Away					
Pld	W	D	L	GF	GA	GD	Pts	W	D	L	GF	GA	GD	W	D	L	GF	GA	GD
5	3	1	1	12	4	+8	10	2	1	0	10	0	+10	1	0	1	2	4	−2

Last updated: 20 September 2025.

==== Results by round ====
Round	1	2	3	4	5
Ground	H	A	H	A	H
Result	W	W	W	L	D
Position	1	1	1	2	

Updated to match(es) played on 20 September 2025. Source:
A = Away; H = Home; W = Win; D = Draw; L = Loss

==== Matches ====
The competition draw was held on 28 July 2025.

24 August 2025 1	Catania	6–0	Foggia	Catania
21:00 UTC+2	Cicerelli 7' (pen.); Donnarumma 21'; Ierardi 32'; Forte 39' (pen.); D'Ausilio 71'; Lunetta 80'			Stadium: Stadio Angelo Massimino; Attendance: 17,800; Referee: Domenico Mirabella

30 August 2025 2	Cavese	0–1	Catania	Cava de' Tirreni
18:00 UTC+2			Forte 55'	Stadium: Stadio Simonetta Lamberti; Referee: Mario Picardi

6 September 2025 3	Catania	4–0	Monopoli	Catania
20:30 UTC+2	Ierardi 24'; Cicerelli 79' (pen.); Aloi 83'; Lunetta 90+6'			Stadium: Stadio Angelo Massimino; Attendance: 17,495; Referee: Alberto Poli

14 September 2025 4	Cosenza	4–1	Catania	Cosenza
15:00 UTC+2	Ricciardi 36'; Florenzi 51'; Kouan 78'; Langella 90+4'		Lunetta 69'	Stadium: Stadio San Vito-Gigi Marulla; Attendance: 835; Referee: Fabio Rosario Luongo

20 September 2025 5	Catania	0–0	Sorrento	Catania
17:30 UTC+2				Stadium: Stadio Angelo Massimino; Referee: Dario Di Francesco

=== Coppa Italia Serie C ===
17 August 2025 First round	Crotone	1–0	Catania	Crotone
21:00	Murano 9'			Stadium: Stadio Ezio Scida; Attendance: 4,660; Referee: Stefano Striamo
