= 2025–26 SS Audace Cerignola season =

Italian football club season 2025-26

SS Audace Cerignola
2025–26 season
- President: Nicola Grieco
- Stadium: Stadio Domenico Monterisi
- Serie C Group C: 12th
- Coppa Italia: First round
- Coppa Italia Serie C: Second round
- Top goalscorer: League: Luigi Cuppone (4); All: Luigi Cuppone (5)
- Biggest win: Audace Cerignola 1–0 Avellino

The 2025–26 season is the 114th in the history of Società Sportiva Audace Cerignola and the club's fourth consecutive season in Serie C of Italian mens' football. In addition to the domestic league, Audace Cerignola competes in the Coppa Italia and the Coppa Italia Serie C. The season began on 10 August 2025.

== Squad ==
=== Transfers In ===
Pos.	Player	Transferred from	Fee	Date	Source
FW	(Italy) Francesco Lorusso	(Italy) Bari U19	Loan return	30 June 2025	
DF	(Italy) Gabriele Ingrosso	(Italy) ACR Messina	Loan return	30 June 2025	
FW	(Italy) Antonio Sabbatani	(Italy) Team Altamura	Free	16 July 2025	
MF	(Italy) Carmine Cretella	(Italy) Padova	Free	18 July 2025	
MF	(Italy) Andrea Moriano	(Italy) Sassuolo U20	Free	18 July 2025	
MF	(Italy) Michele Emmausso	(Italy) Foggia	Undisclosed	22 July 2025	
DF	(Argentina) Gianfranco Giuliodori	(Italy) Reggina	Undisclosed	25 July 2025	
MF	(Spain) Oscar Moreso	(Italy) Enna	Undisclosed	28 July 2025	
MF	(Italy) Ludovico D'Orazio	(Italy) SPAL	Free	29 July 2025	
MF	(Italy) Zak Ruggiero	(Italy) Trapani	Loan	8 August 2025	
MF	(Italy) Gaetano Vitale	(Italy) Cavese	Undisclosed	21 August 2025	
FW	(Greece) Athanasios Dabizas	(Greece) Panathinaikos	Undisclosed	23 August 2025	
GK	(Bulgaria) Velizar-Iliya Iliev	(Italy) Cagliari	Loan	28 August 2025	
DF	(Italy) Ruggero La Branca	(Italy) Lazio U20	Undisclosed	28 August 2025	
DF	(Italy) Gianmarco Todisco	(Italy) Avellino	Loan	31 August 2025	
FW	(Italy) Diego Gambale	(Italy) Pineto	€50,000	1 September 2025	
DF	(Italy) Andrea Gasbarro	Unattached		12 September 2025	

=== Transfers Out ===
Pos.	Player	Transferred to	Fee	Date	Source
MF	(Republic of Ireland) Ed McJannet	(Italy) Lecce	Loan return	30 June 2025	
MF	(Morocco) Ismail Achik	(Italy) Bari	Loan return	30 June 2025	
FW	(Italy) Filippo D'Andrea	(Italy) Catania	Loan return	30 June 2025	
DF	(Argentina) Santiago Velásquez	(Italy) Sarnese	Free	30 July 2025	
FW	(Italy) Luca Gagliano	(Italy) Latina	Undisclosed	13 August 2025	
MF	(Italy) Giuseppe Coccia	(Italy) Barletta	Free	30 August 2025	
FW	(Italy) Antonio Sabbatani	(Italy) Sorrento	Loan	1 September 2025	
MF	(Italy) Mattia Tascone	(Italy) Salernitana	Undisclosed	1 September 2025	
DF	(Italy) Gabriele Ingrosso	(Italy) Heraclea	Free	1 September 2025	
FW	(Italy) Francesco Lorusso			1 September 2025	
FW	(Italy) Alessandro Faggioli	(Italy) Triestina		1 September 2025	

== Friendlies ==
3 August 2025	Audace Cerignola	4–1	Savoia

== Competitions ==
=== Overall record ===
Competition	First match	Last match	Starting round	Final position	Record							
Competition	First match	Last match	Starting round	Final position	Pld	W	D	L	GF	GA	GD	Win %
Serie C	25 August 2025	26 April 2026	Matchday 1		5	1	3	1	5	5	+0	20.00
Coppa Italia	10 August 2025	18 August 2025	Preliminary round	First round	2	1	1	0	2	1	+1	50.00
Coppa Italia Serie C	28–30 October 2025		Second round		0	0	0	0	0	0	+0	—
Total					7	2	4	1	7	6	+1	28.57

Last updated: 20 September 2025
Source: Competitions

=== Serie C ===
Group C

==== Results summary ====
Overall								Home						Away					
Pld	W	D	L	GF	GA	GD	Pts	W	D	L	GF	GA	GD	W	D	L	GF	GA	GD
5	1	3	1	5	5	0	6	1	2	0	5	3	+2	0	1	1	0	2	−2

Last updated: 20 September 2025.

==== Results by round ====
Round	1	2	3	4	5
Ground	H	A	H	A	H
Result	D	D	W	L	D
Position	7	12	5	12	

Updated to match(es) played on 20 September 2025. Source:
A = Away; H = Home; W = Win; D = Draw; L = Loss

==== Matches ====
25 August 2025 1	Audace Cerignola	2–2	Picerno	Cerignola
21:00 UTC+2	Cuppone 41', 85'		Energe 8'; Abreu 45+1'	Stadium: Stadio Domenico Monterisi; Attendance: 2,341; Referee: Valerio Pezzopane

30 August 2025 2	Potenza	0–0	Audace Cerignola	Potenza
21:00 UTC+2				Stadium: Stadio Alfredo Viviani; Attendance: 3,024; Referee: Dario Madonia

7 September 2025 3	Audace Cerignola	3–1	Siracusa	Cerignola
20:30 UTC+2	Cuppone 58', 90+1'; Emmausso 76'		Pacciardi 51'	Stadium: Stadio Domenico Monterisi; Referee: Ciro Aldi

12 September 2025 4	Monopoli	2–0	Audace Cerignola	Monopoli
20:30 UTC+2	Visentin 17' (o.g.); Fall 63'		Cocorocchio (yellow card) 18' (yellow-red card) 38'; Cretella (red card) 31'	Stadium: Stadio Vito Simone Veneziani; Referee: Mattia Ubaldi

20 September 2025 5	Audace Cerignola	0–0	Foggia	Cerignola
17:30 UTC+2				Stadium: Stadio Domenico Monterisi; Referee: Maksym Frasynyak

=== Coppa Italia ===
10 August 2025 Preliminary round	Audace Cerignola	1–0	Avellino	Cerignola
20:30 UTC+2	Cuppone 61'			Stadium: Stadio Domenico Monterisi; Attendance: 2,532; Referee: Gabriele Sacchi

18 August 2025 First round	Audace Cerignola	1–1 (2–4 p)	Hellas Verona	Cerignola
18:00	Ángel 90+1'		Bradarić 55'	Stadium: Stadio Domenico Monterisi; Attendance: 3,500; Referee: Luca Massimi

=== Coppa Italia Serie C ===
28–30 October 2025 Second round	Audace Cerignola	v	Casarano
