= 2025–26 SS Arezzo season =

Football season

SS Arezzo
2025–26 season
- Manager: Cristian Bucchi
- Stadium: Stadio Città di Arezzo
- Serie C Group B: 1st
- Coppa Italia Serie C: Second round
- Biggest win: Pontedera 0–3 Arezzo

The 2025–26 season is the 103rd in the history of Società Sportiva Arezzo and the club's third consecutive season in Serie C. In addition to the domestic league, Arezzo competes in the Coppa Italia Serie C. The season began on 16 August 2025.

== Squad ==
=== Transfers In ===
Pos.	Player	Transferred from	Fee	Date	Source
MF	(Italy) Mattia Gaddini	(Italy) Pontedera	Loan return	30 June 2025	
MF	(Ghana) Shaka Mawuli	(Italy) FC Südtirol	Undisclosed	1 July 2025	
FW	(Portugal) Muhamed Varela Djamanca	(Italy) Reggiana	Undisclosed	8 July 2025	
DF	(Italy) Filippo De Col	(Italy) LR Vicenza	Free	15 July 2025	
MF	(Italy) Marco Meli	(Italy) Juve Stabia	Loan	30 July 2025	
FW	(Italy) Pietro Cianci	(Italy) Ternana	€100,000	4 August 2025	
DF	(Italy) Fabio Tito	(Italy) Ternana	Undisclosed	26 August 2025	

=== Transfers Out ===
Pos.	Player	Transferred to	Fee	Date	Source
FW	(Italy) Roberto Ogunseye	(Italy) Cesena	Loan return	30 June 2025	
MF	(Italy) Salvatore Santoro	(Italy) Guidonia Montecelio	Free	9 July 2025	
MF	(Italy) Mattia Gaddini	(Italy) Cittadella	Undisclosed	25 July 2025	
MF	(Italy) Mattia Damiani	(Italy) Arzignano Valchiampo	Loan	1 August 2025	
MF	(Italy) Andrea Settembrini	(Italy) Prato	Free	9 August 2025	
DF	(Italy) Lorenzo Coccia	(Italy) Pianese	Loan	28 August 2025	
DF	(Italy) Dario Del Fabro	(Italy) Giugliano	Undisclosed	1 September 2025	

== Friendlies ==
18 July 2025	Arezzo A	2–1	Arezzo B	Storo
18:00 UTC+2	Varela 5'; Pattarello 25'		Tavernelli 63'

22 July 2025	Napoli	0–2	Arezzo	Dimaro
17:30 UTC+2			Pattarello 37'; Varela 90'	Attendance: 2,200; Referee: Kevin Bonacina

27 July 2025	Mantova	1–2	Arezzo	Mezzana
16:00 UTC+2	Mancuso 74'	Report	Righetti 17'; Concetti 90+2'	Referee: Silvia Gasperotti

2 August 2025	Fiorentina Primavera	1–2	Arezzo	Viola Park
18:00 UTC+2

7 August 2025	Sansepolcro	1–1	Arezzo

== Competitions ==
=== Overall record ===
Competition	First match	Last match	Starting round	Record							
Competition	First match	Last match	Starting round	Pld	W	D	L	GF	GA	GD	Win %
Serie C	22 August 2025	26 April 2026	Matchday 1	5	4	0	1	8	3	+5	80.00
Coppa Italia Serie C	16 August 2025		First round	1	1	0	0	2	1	+1	100.00
Total				6	5	0	1	10	4	+6	83.33

Last updated: 19 September 2025
Source: Competitions

=== Serie C ===
Group B

==== Results summary ====
Overall								Home						Away					
Pld	W	D	L	GF	GA	GD	Pts	W	D	L	GF	GA	GD	W	D	L	GF	GA	GD
5	4	0	1	8	3	+5	12	2	0	1	2	1	+1	2	0	0	6	2	+4

Last updated: 19 September 2025.

==== Results by round ====
Round	1	2	3	4	5	6
Ground	H	A	H	A	H	A
Result	W	W	W	W	L	
Position	2	1	1	1	1	

Updated to match(es) played on 19 September 2025. Source:
A = Away; H = Home; W = Win; D = Draw; L = Loss

==== Matches ====
22 August 2025 1	Arezzo	1–0	Forlì	Arezzo
21:15 UTC+2	Tavernelli 50'			Stadium: Stadio Città di Arezzo; Attendance: 4,100; Referee: Antonio Di Reda

29 August 2025 2	Pontedera	0–3	Arezzo	Pontedera
21:00 UTC+2			Tavernelli 8'; Chierico 30'; Chiosa (yellow card) 45+1' (yellow-red card) 61'; Varela Djamanca 88'	Stadium: Stadio Ettore Mannucci; Attendance: 1,154; Referee: Francesco Burlando

6 September 2025 3	Arezzo	1–0	Vis Pesaro	Arezzo
17:38 UTC+2	Ravasio 80'			Stadium: Stadio Città di Arezzo; Attendance: 4,500; Referee: Alessandro Pizzi
Note: The match was delayed from its original 17:30 kick-off time due to a technical problem.

14 September 2025 4	Juventus Next Gen	2–3	Arezzo	Alessandria
12:30 UTC+2	Turicchia 2'; Turco 26'		Pattarello 35'; Pedro Felipe 65' (o.g.); Ravasio 90+6' (pen.)	Stadium: Stadio Giuseppe Moccagatta; Attendance: 350; Referee: Michele Maccorin

19 September 2025 5	Arezzo	0–1	Guidonia Montecelio	Arezzo
20:30 UTC+2			Spavone 22'	Stadium: Stadio Città di Arezzo; Referee: Gabriele Sacchi

23 September 2025 6	Pianese	v	Arezzo	Piancastagnaio
18:30 UTC+2				Stadium: Stadio Comunale

=== Coppa Italia Serie C ===
16 August 2025 First round	Arezzo	2–1	Bra	Arezzo
18:00 UTC+2	Mawuli 31'; Chierico 39'		Sinani 16'	Stadium: Stadio Città di Arezzo; Attendance: 1,900; Referee: Leonardo Leorsini

29 October 2025 Second round	Arezzo	v	Torres
18:30 UTC+2
