= 2025–26 AC Bra season =

Italian football club season 2025-26

AC Bra
2025–26 season
- Manager: Fabio Nisticò
- Stadium: Stadio Giuseppe Sivori
- Serie C Group B: 19th
- Coppa Italia: First round
- Biggest defeat: Ravenna 3–1 Bra
Home colours	Away colours	Third colours

The 2025–26 season is the 113th in the history of Associazione Calcio Bra and the club's first season in the third tier of Italian men's football since 1948. In addition to the domestic league, Bra competed in the Coppa Italia Serie C. The season began on 16 August 2025.

== Squad ==
=== Transfers In ===
Pos.	Player	Transferred from	Fee	Date	Source
DF	(Italy) Benedikt Rottensteiner	(Italy) Südtirol	Undisclosed	9 July 2025	
FW	(Kosovo) Ismet Sinani	(Italy) Clodiense	Free	19 July 2025	
MF	(Italy) Giorgio Lionetti	(Italy) Ligorna	Free	19 July 2025	
DF	(Italy) Paolo Cannistrà	(Italy) NovaRomentin	Free	19 July 2025	
MF	(Italy) Riccardo Campedelli	(Italy) Cesena U20	Loan	21 July 2025	
DF	(Italy) Denis Chiesa	(Italy) Dolomiti Bellunesi	Free	22 July 2025	
DF	(Italy) Francesco Pio Cucciniello	(Italy) Virtus Entella	Free	25 July 2025	
DF	(Italy) Umberto Morleo	(Italy) Catanzaro	Loan	25 July 2025	
GK	(Italy) Daniele Menicucci	(Italy) Pro Patria Youth	Free	31 July 2025	
MF	(Italy) Samuele Dimatteo	(Italy) Entella U19	Free	31 July 2025	
MF	(Italy) Alessio Brambilla	(Italy) US Cremonese	Loan	4 August 2025	
DF	(Italy) Eros De Santis	(Italy) Team Altamura	Free	6 August 2025	
GK	(Italy) Davide Renzetti	(Italy) SS Lazio	Loan	8 August 2025	
FW	(Italy) Gianmarco Di Biase	(Italy) Juventus Next Gen	Undisclosed	26 August 2025	
MF	(Italy) Tommaso Maressa	(Italy) Novara	Undisclosed	1 September 2025	
MF	(Italy) Andrea Nesci	(Italy) NovaRomentin	Undisclosed	1 September 2025	

=== Transfers Out ===
Pos.	Player	Transferred to	Fee	Date	Source
DF	(France) Ludovic Legal	(Italy) Legnago Salus	Free	15 July 2025	
MF	(Italy) Jesus Christ Mawete	(Italy) Livorno	Free	19 July 2025	
MF	(Italy) Thomas Gerbino	(Italy) Derthona	Free	20 July 2025	
DF	(Morocco) Adam Amansour	(Italy) Albese	Free	23 July 2025	
FW	(Italy) Davide Aloia	(Italy) Este	Loan	29 August 2025	
MF	(Spain) Bandjougou Sangaré Traoré		Contract terminated	1 September 2025	

== Friendlies ==
23 July 2025	Pisa	5–0	Bra

28 July 2025	Palermo FC	1–0	Bra	Châtillon
17:30

30 July 2025	Virtus Entella	7–0	Bra

== Competitions ==
=== Overall record ===
Competition	First match	Last match	Starting round	Record							
Competition	First match	Last match	Starting round	Pld	W	D	L	GF	GA	GD	Win %
Serie C	22 August 2025	26 April 2026	Matchday 1	5	0	2	3	4	8	−4	0.00
Coppa Italia Serie C	16 August 2025		First round	1	0	0	1	1	2	−1	0.00
Total				6	0	2	4	5	10	−5	0.00

Last updated: 20 September 2025
Source: Competitions

=== Serie C ===
Group B

==== Results summary ====
Overall								Home						Away					
Pld	W	D	L	GF	GA	GD	Pts	W	D	L	GF	GA	GD	W	D	L	GF	GA	GD
5	0	2	3	4	8	−4	2	0	2	0	3	3	0	0	0	3	1	5	−4

Last updated: 20 September 2025.

==== Results by round ====
Round	1	2	3	4	5	6
Ground	A	H	A	H	A	H
Result	L	D	L	D	L	
Position	16	15	18	19	19	

Updated to match(es) played on 20 September 2025. Source:
A = Away; H = Home; W = Win; D = Draw; L = Loss

==== Matches ====
22 August 2025 1	Sambenedettese	1–0	Bra	San Benedetto del Tronto
21:15 UTC+2	Konate 36'			Stadium: Stadio Riviera delle Palme; Attendance: 9,165; Referee: Gianluca Guitaldi

30 August 2025 2	Bra	2–2	Perugia	Sestri Levante
18:00 UTC+2	Minaj 45+1'; Sganzerla (yellow card) 58' (yellow-red card) 90+8'; La Marca 67'		Nwanege (yellow card) 45' (yellow-red card) 51'; Giunti 48'; Ogunseye 90+12' (pen.)	Stadium: Stadio Giuseppe Sivori; Attendance: 350; Referee: Giuseppe Rispoli

7 September 2025 3	Ravenna	3–1	Bra	Ravenna
17:30 UTC+2	Tenkorang 60', 82'; Mandorlini 90+6'		Di Biase 89'	Stadium: Stadio Bruno Benelli; Attendance: 3,813; Referee: Mattia Maresca

14 September 2025 4	Bra	1–1	Torres	Sestri Levante
15:00 UTC+2	Sinani 36'		Diakité 74'	Stadium: Stadio Giuseppe Sivori; Attendance: 229; Referee: Andrea Mazzer

20 September 2025 5	Gubbio	1–0	Bra	Gubbio
15:00 UTC+2	Di Bitonto 57'			Stadium: Stadio Pietro Barbetti; Referee: Andrea Terribile

23 September 2025 6	Bra	v	Livorno	Sestri Levante
20:45 UTC+2				Stadium: Stadio Giuseppe Sivori

=== Coppa Italia Serie C ===
16 August 2025 First round	Arezzo	2–1	Bra	Arezzo
18:00 UTC+2	Mawuli 31'; Chierico 39'	Report	Sinani 16'	Stadium: Stadio Città di Arezzo; Attendance: 1,900; Referee: Leonardo Leorsini
