= Laezza =

Laezza is an Italian surname. Notable people with the surname include:

- Giuliano Laezza (born 1993), Italian footballer
- Giuseppe Laezza (1835–1905), Italian painter
