= Stefano Greco =

Italian footballer (born 1999)

Personal information
- Date of birth: 21 February 1999 (age 27)
- Place of birth: Galatina, Italy
- Height: 1.85 m (6 ft 1 in)
- Position: Goalkeeper

Team information
- Current team: Giugliano (on loan from Audace Cerignola)
- Number: 77

Youth career
- Sporting Soleto
- Lecce
- 2015–2019: Roma

Senior career*
Years	Team	Apps	(Gls)
2017–2022	Roma	0	(0)
2019–2020	→ Vibonese (loan)	20	(0)
2020–2021	→ Pro Patria (loan)	34	(0)
2021–2022	→ Potenza (loan)	11	(0)
2023–2024	Gubbio	17	(0)
2024–	Audace Cerignola	27	(0)
2026–	→ Giugliano (loan)	16	(0)

International career^{‡}
2014	Italy U15	4	(0)
2014–2015	Italy U16	11	(0)
2015	Italy U17	5	(0)
2016	Italy U18	3	(0)
- * Club domestic league appearances and goals as of 1 May 2026 ‡ National team caps and goals as of 7 October 2016

Stefano Greco (born 21 February 1999) is an Italian professional footballer who plays as a goalkeeper for Giugliano, on loan from Audace Cerignola.

== Club career ==
=== Roma ===
He is a product of Roma youth teams and started appearing for their Under-19 squad in the 2016–17 season.

He first appeared for Roma's senior squad on 14 July 2018 in a pre-season friendly against Latina. He was called up to the senior squad on several occasions in the 2018–19 Serie A seasons, but did not make any appearances.

==== Loan to Vibonese ====
On 18 July 2019, Greco was loaned to Serie C club Vibonese on a season-long loan deal. He made his professional Serie C debut for Vibonese on 25 August 2019 in a season-starting game, a 1–0 away defeat against Monopoli. He established himself as Vibonese first-choice goalkeeper early in the season. Three weeks later, on 15 September, Greco kept his first clean sheet for the club, a 3–0 home win over Rende. Greco ended his season-long loan to Vibonese with 20 appearances, 30 goals conceded and only 1 clean sheet and he also remaining an unused substitute for 9 other league matches.

==== Loan to Pro Patria ====
On 12 August 2020, Greco was signed by Serie C club Pro Patria on a season-long loan deal. On 27 September he made his debut for the club and he also kept his first clean sheet in a 0–0 away draw against Carrarese. Ten days later, on 7 October, he kept his second clean sheet in a 1–0 away win over Olbia, and on 10 October, his third in a 0–0 home draw against Pistoiese. Greco helped the club to reach the play-off, however the club lost 3–1 against Juventus U23 in the first round and he ended his season-long loan with 35 appearances, 27 goals conceded and 18 clean sheets.

=== Gubbio ===
On 9 February 2023, Greco signed with Gubbio.

== International career ==
He was first called up to represent his country in 2014 with the Under-15 squad.

He later appeared for Under-16, Under-17 and Under-18 squads, all in friendlies. He was not selected for the 2016 UEFA European Under-17 Championship squad despite receiving call-ups at qualification stage.

== Career statistics ==
=== Club ===
As of 22 May 2021

Club	Season	League			Cup		Europe		Other		Total	
Club	Season	League	Apps	Goals	Apps	Goals	Apps	Goals	Apps	Goals	Apps	Goals
Vibonese (loan)	2019–20	Serie C	20	0	0	0	—		—		20	0
Pro Patria (loan)	2020–21	Serie C	34	0	0	0	—		1 (Note: All appearance(s) in Serie C play-off.)	0	35	0
Career total			54	0	0	0	—		1	0	55	0
