= Giovanni Foschiani =

Italian footballer

Personal information
- Date of birth: 7 July 2003 (age 23)
- Position: Right-back

Team information
- Current team: Club Milano

Youth career
- Pordenone

Senior career*
Years	Team	Apps	(Gls)
2020–2021	Pordenone	1	(0)
2021–2023	Città di Varese	67	(4)
2023–	Club Milano	23	(3)
- * Club domestic league appearances and goals as of 20 December 2023

Giovanni Foschiani (born 7 July 2003) is an Italian professional footballer who plays as a right-back for Serie D side Club Milano.

== Career ==
Foschiani was raised in the youth system of Pordenone and was first called up to the senior squad in November 2020. He made his Serie B debut for Pordenone on 16 March 2021 in a game against Empoli, he substituted Roberto Zammarini in added time.

On 5 August 2021, Foschiani joined Serie D side Città di Varese.
