= Klāvs Bethers =

Latvian footballer

Personal information
- Date of birth: 24 December 2003 (age 22)
- Place of birth: Aizpute, Latvia
- Height: 1.86 m (6 ft 1 in)
- Position: Goalkeeper

Team information
- Current team: Savoia
- Number: 1

Youth career
- Liepāja

Senior career*
Years	Team	Apps	(Gls)
2020–2021	Liepāja	0	(0)
2020	→ Grobiņa (loan)	9	(0)
2022	Città di Sant'Agata	17	(0)
2022–2023	Piacenza	0	(0)
2022–2023	→ Catania (loan)	31	(0)
2023–2026	Catania	27	(0)
2026–	Savoia	0	(0)

International career^{‡}
2019	Latvia U-17	2	(0)
2024	Latvia U-21	1	(0)
- * Club domestic league appearances and goals as of 18 December 2024 ‡ National team caps and goals as of 15 October 2024

Klāvs Bethers (born 24 December 2003) is a Latvian professional footballer who plays as a goalkeeper for Italian Serie C Group C club Savoia and the Latvian national under-21 team.

== Career ==
Bethers started his career in his native Latvia with FK Liepāja, then making his senior debut in the 2020 Latvian First League with Grobiņa. In January 2022, he left Latvia to move to Italy, joining Sicilian amateur club Città di Sant'Agata of Serie D. Following that, he was signed by Serie C club Piacenza, who then loaned him out to Catania for the 2022–23 Serie D season, where Bethers played as a regular and won promotion to Serie C.

In 2023, Catania signed Bethers permanently from Piacenza. Despite the acquisition of a more experienced goalkeeper in Alessandro Livieri, Bethers managed to confirm himself as the first choice for Catania in his role also during the 2023–24 Serie C season.

== Honours ==
Catania

- Serie D: 2022–23 (Group I)
