= Diego Gambale =

Italian footballer (born 1998)

Personal information
- Date of birth: 9 November 1998 (age 28)
- Place of birth: Rome, Italy
- Height: 1.89 m (6 ft 2 in)
- Position: Forward

Team information
- Current team: Cerignola
- Number: 9

Youth career
- –2018: Lupa Roma
- 2017–2018: → Boreale (loan)

Senior career*
Years	Team	Apps	(Gls)
2018–2019	Boreale	36	(21)
2019–2021	Montespaccato	32	(14)
2021–2023	Montevarchi	35	(12)
2022–2023	→ Avellino (loan)	32	(3)
2023–2025	Pineto	73	(8)
2025–	Cerignola	34	(14)
- * Club domestic league appearances and goals as of 1 May 2026

Diego Gambale (born 9 November 1998) is an Italian professional footballer who plays as a forward for Serie C Group C club Cerignola.

== Club career ==
Born in Rome, Gambale started his career in Lupa Roma youth sector. He moved to the Eccellenza club Boreale for the 2018–19 season. He played 36 and scored 21 goals with the club.

On 17 June 2019, he joined to Serie D club Montespaccato Calcio.

On 13 July 2021, Gambale signed with Serie C club Montevarchi. He made his professional debut on 30 August 2021 against Reggiana.

On 1 September 2022, Gambale joined Avellino on loan with an option to buy and an obligation to buy in case of Avellino's promotion to Serie B.

On 12 July 2023, he signed a 2-year deal with Pineto.
