= Marco Caldore =

Italian footballer

Personal information
- Date of birth: 28 February 1994 (age 32)
- Place of birth: Naples, Italy
- Height: 1.84 m (6 ft 0 in)
- Position: Centre-back

Team information
- Current team: Giugliano
- Number: 24

Youth career
- Genoa

Senior career*
Years	Team	Apps	(Gls)
2013	Genoa	0	(0)
2013	→ Aversa (loan)	2	(0)
2013–2014	Sorrento	21	(0)
2014–2015	Gubbio	14	(0)
2016	Paganese	0	(0)
2016	Sangiovannese	8	(0)
2016–2017	Racing Roma	19	(0)
2017–2019	Team Altamura	56	(3)
2019–2020	Casertana	22	(1)
2020–2021	Taranto	10	(0)
2021–2023	Juve Stabia	81	(7)
2023–	Giugliano	108	(2)
- * Club domestic league appearances and goals as of 1 May 2026

Marco Caldore (born 28 February 1994) is an Italian professional footballer who plays as a centre-back for Serie C Group C club Giugliano.

== Career ==
Born in Naples, Caldore started his career in Genoa youth sector. He made his senior debut with Lega Pro Seconda Divisione clubs Aversa and Sorrento.

In July 2014, he signed with Serie C club Gubbio. Caldore made his Serie C debut on 30 August against L'Aquila.

On 1 February 2021, he moved to Serie C club Juve Stabia.

On 10 July 2023, Caldore joined Giugliano on a two-year deal.
