= Mario Prezioso =

Italian footballer

Personal information
- Full name: Mario Francesco Prezioso
- Date of birth: 15 April 1996 (age 30)
- Place of birth: Avellino, Italy
- Height: 1.78 m (5 ft 10 in)
- Position: Central midfielder

Team information
- Current team: Giugliano
- Number: 28

Youth career
- Napoli

Senior career*
| Years | Team | Apps | (Gls) |
| 2015–2021 | Napoli | 0 | (0) |
| 2015–2016 | → Melfi (loan) | 7 | (0) |
| 2016 | → Teramo (loan) | 0 | (0) |
| 2016–2017 | → Virtus Francavilla (loan) | 35 | (2) |
| 2017 | → Carpi (loan) | 0 | (0) |
| 2018 | → Bisceglie (loan) | 11 | (0) |
| 2018–2020 | → Vibonese (loan) | 48 | (5) |
| 2020 | → Cosenza (loan) | 6 | (0) |
| 2020–2021 | → Modena (loan) | 32 | (2) |
| 2021–2022 | Virtus Francavilla | 29 | (2) |
| 2022–2023 | Ancona | 31 | (0) |
| 2023–2024 | Potenza | 7 | (0) |
| 2024 | → Ancona (loan) | 15 | (0) |
| 2024–2025 | Campobasso | 21 | (0) |
| 2025– | Giugliano | 18 | (0) |
- * Club domestic league appearances and goals as of 1 May 2026

Mario Francesco Prezioso (born 15 April 1996) is an Italian professional footballer who plays as a central midfielder for Serie C Group C club Giugliano.

== Club career ==
On 30 January 2020, he moved to Serie B club Cosenza on loan.

On 26 September 2020, he joined Serie C club Modena on loan.

On 21 July 2021, he returned to Virtus Francavilla on a permanent basis and signed a two-year contract.

On 23 June 2022, Prezioso joined Ancona until June 2024.

On 22 July 2023, Prezioso moved to Potenza.

On 2 January 2024, he joined Ancona on loan.

On 17 July 2024, he joined Campobasso.
