= Santiago Visentin =

Argentine footballer

Personal information
- Full name: Santiago Guido Visentin
- Date of birth: 5 March 1999 (age 27)
- Place of birth: Rosario, Argentina
- Height: 1.87 m (6 ft 2 in)
- Position: Defender

Youth career
- –2017: Ferro
- 2017–2018: Pordenone
- 2018: → Fiorentina (loan)

Senior career*
Years	Team	Apps	(Gls)
2017–2018	Pordenone	0	(0)
2018–2019	Belluno	32	(2)
2019–2020	Deportivo Maipú		
2020–2021	Virtus Verona	41	(1)
2021–2022	Crotone	5	(0)
2022–2023	Cittadella	20	(0)
2024–2026	Cerignola	56	(4)
- * Club domestic league appearances and goals as of 19 December 2025

Santiago Guido Visentin (born 5 March 1999) is Argentine football player who plays as a centre-back.

== Club career ==
He made his professional Serie C debut for Virtus Verona on 26 January 2020 in a game against Feralpisalò.

On 1 August 2021, he signed with Serie B club Crotone for the term of three years, with an option to extend for fourth year. He made his Serie B debut for Crotone on 22 August 2021 against Como.

On 31 January 2022, he joined Cittadella.

== Personal life ==
On 31 January 2023, Visentin was charged with gang rape and sentenced to six years in prison together with four other former teammates of his from his time at Virtus Verona.
