= Alessandro Tonti =

Italian footballer (born 1992)

Personal information
- Date of birth: 28 May 1992 (age 34)
- Place of birth: Cattolica, Italy
- Height: 1.87 m (6 ft 2 in)
- Position: Goalkeeper

Team information
- Current team: Pineto
- Number: 22

Youth career
- Grosseto

Senior career*
Years	Team	Apps	(Gls)
2010–2011	Vis Misano		
2011–2014	Cesena	0	(0)
2012–2013	→ Borgo a Buggiano (loan)	30	(0)
2013–2014	→ Forlì (loan)	32	(0)
2014–2016	Teramo	63	(0)
2016–2017	Latina	0	(0)
2017	Mantova	13	(0)
2017–2018	Matera	8	(0)
2018–2019	Como	21	(0)
2019–2020	Avellino	13	(0)
2020–2021	Ravenna	13	(0)
2022–2023	Latina	26	(0)
2023–	Pineto	105	(0)
- * Club domestic league appearances and goals as of 30 April 2026 2026

Alessandro Tonti (born 28 May 1992) is an Italian professional footballer who plays as a goalkeeper for Serie C Group B club Pineto.

== Career ==
Born in Cattolica, Tonti started his career in Grosseto youth sector.

In 2011, he moved to Cesena U-19. He was loaned to Borgo a Buggiano for 2012–13 Serie C2 season. Tonti made his professional on 2 September against Aversa Normanna.

He left Cesena in 2014, and signed with Serie C club Teramo. He extended his contract the next season.

In the 2016–17 season, he played with Latina.

On 15 August 2017, he joined to Serie C club Matera.

On 19 August 2020, he moved to Ravenna.

On 7 January 2022, he returned to Latina as a free agent.
