= Luigi Cuppone =

Italian footballer

Personal information
- Date of birth: 6 August 1997 (age 29)
- Place of birth: Nardò, Italy
- Height: 1.78 m (5 ft 10 in)
- Position: Forward

Team information
- Current team: Virtus Entella
- Number: 10

Youth career
- 2005–2006: Lecce Neviano
- 2006: Montefiore Gallipoli
- 2006–2014: Lecce
- 2014–2015: → Carpi (loan)

Senior career*
Years	Team	Apps	(Gls)
2015–2016	Lugano II	16	(10)
2016–2017	Lugano	0	(0)
2016	→ Triestina (loan)	6	(0)
2017	Vicenza	1	(0)
2017–2020	Pisa	14	(0)
2018	→ Paganese (loan)	9	(3)
2019	→ Bisceglie (loan)	18	(1)
2019–2020	→ Monopoli (loan)	22	(3)
2020–2021	Casertana	32	(14)
2021–2023	Cittadella	5	(0)
2022	→ Potenza (loan)	14	(8)
2022–2023	→ Pescara (loan)	35	(5)
2023–2024	Pescara	37	(8)
2024–2026	Audace Cerignola	26	(10)
2026–	Virtus Entella	18	(6)
- * Club domestic league appearances and goals as of 13 May 2026

Luigi Cuppone (born 6 August 1997) is an Italian footballer who plays for Serie B club Virtus Entella as a forward.

== Professional career ==
Cuppone begun his career as a youth player for Lecce. He moved abroad to begin his professional career with the Swiss club Lugano in 2015. Cuppone made his professional debut for Vicenza in a 1-0 Serie B loss to Spezia on 18 May 2017.

On 17 January 2019, he joined Bisceglie on loan.

On 20 July 2019, he joined Monopoli on loan with an option to buy.

On 23 September 2020, he joined Casertana.

On 4 July 2021, he signed with Cittadella.

On 31 January 2022, Cuppone transferred to Potenza.

On 18 July 2022, Cuppone transferred to Pescara on loan with an obligation to buy.
