= Riccardo Ladinetti =

Italian footballer (born 2000)

Personal information
- Date of birth: 20 December 2000 (age 25)
- Place of birth: Cagliari, Italy
- Height: 1.82 m (6 ft 0 in)
- Position: Midfielder

Team information
- Current team: Perugia (on loan from Pontedera)
- Number: 21

Youth career
- Cagliari

Senior career*
Years	Team	Apps	(Gls)
2020–2022	Cagliari	3	(0)
2020–2021	→ Olbia (loan)	29	(2)
2022	→ Olbia (loan)	14	(0)
2022–2023	Pontedera	31	(1)
2023–2024	Catania	10	(0)
2024	→ Taranto (loan)	8	(0)
2024–	Pontedera	50	(3)
2026–	→ Perugia (loan)	12	(1)
- * Club domestic league appearances and goals as of 30 April 2026

Riccardo Ladinetti (born 20 December 2000) is an Italian professional footballer who plays as a midfielder for Serie C Group B club Perugia, on loan from Pontedera.

== Career ==
Ladinetti made his Serie A debut for Cagliari on 18 July 2020 in a game against Sassuolo.

On 5 October 2020, he joined Serie C club Olbia on loan. On 31 January 2022, Ladinetti returned to Olbia on a new loan.

On 6 August 2022, Ladinetti signed with Serie C side Pontedera.

Ladinetti joined Catania, also of Serie C, in July 2023.

After 10 appearances with the Sicilian club, Ladinetti concludes the loan to move to Taranto, still in Group C of Serie C.

== Career statistics ==
As of match played 23 January 2024

Appearances and goals by club, season and competition
Club	Season	League			National cup (Note: Includes Coppa Italia, Coppa Italia Serie C)		Europe		Other		Total	
Club	Season	Division	Apps	Goals	Apps	Goals	Apps	Goals	Apps	Goals	Apps	Goals
Cagliari	2019–20	Serie A	3	0	0	0	—		—		3	0
Cagliari	2021–22	Serie A	0	0	1	0	—		—		1	0
Cagliari	Total		3	0	1	0	—		—		4	0
Olbia (loan)	2020–21	Serie C	29	2	0	0	—		—		29	2
Olbia (loan)	2021–22	Serie C	14	0	0	0	—		2 (Note: Appearance(s) in Serie C play-off)	1	16	1
Olbia (loan)	Total		43	2	0	0	—		2	1	45	3
Pontedera	2022–23	Serie C	29	1	3	0	—		2	0	34	1
Catania	2023–24	Serie C	10	0	1	0	—		—		11	0
Career total			85	3	5	0	—		4	1	94	4
