= David D'Antoni =

Italian footballer (born 1979)

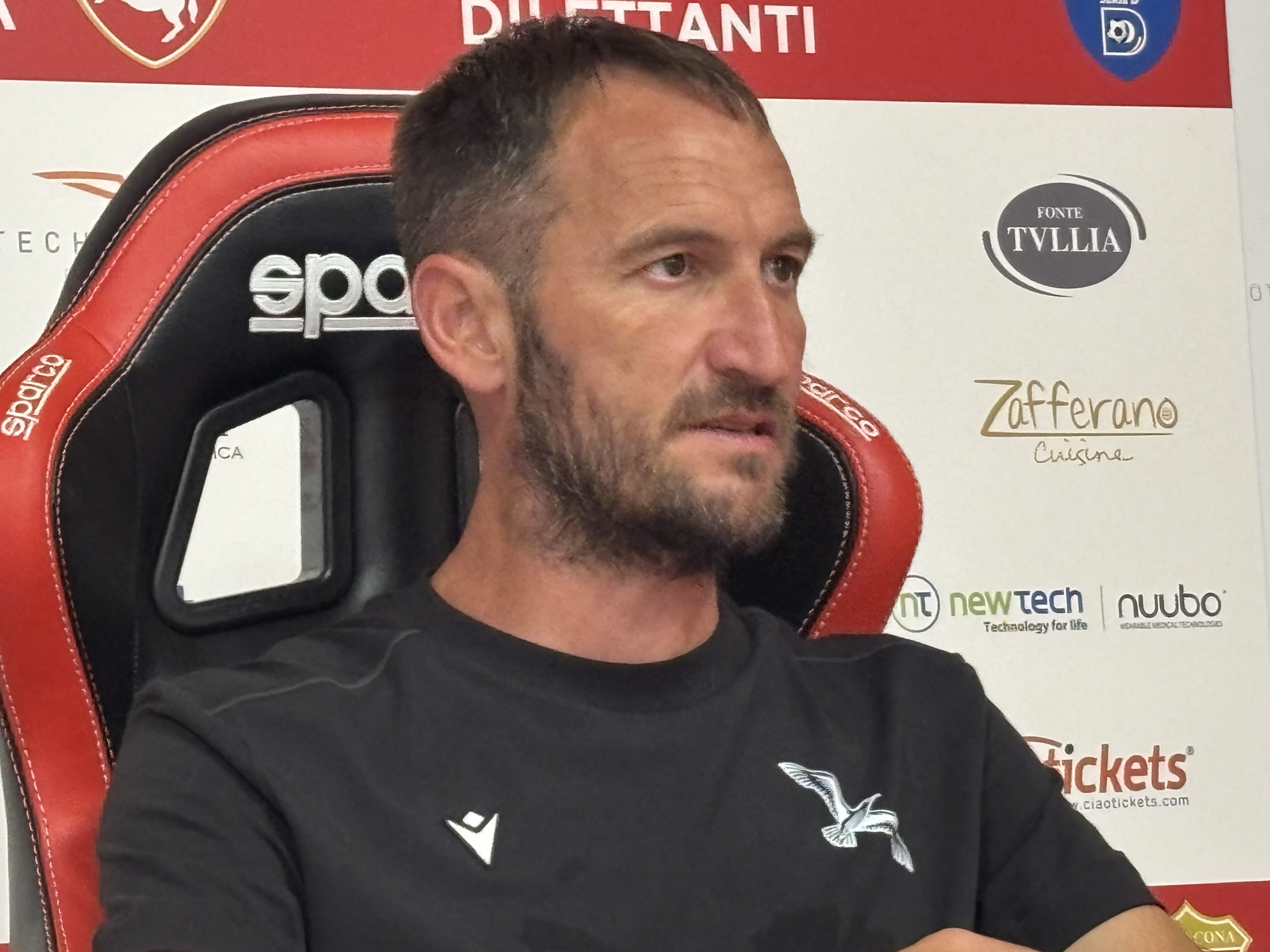

Personal information
- Date of birth: 28 January 1979 (age 47)
- Place of birth: Viterbo, Italy
- Height: 1.80 m (5 ft 11 in)
- Position: Midfielder

Team information
- Current team: Ostiamare (head coach)

Youth career
- 1997–1998: Ladispoli

Senior career*
Years	Team	Apps	(Gls)
1998	Empoli	1	(0)
1999	Alessandria	11	(0)
1999–2001	Vis Pesaro	49	(2)
2001–2002	Salernitana	32	(0)
2003	Cesena	8	(0)
2003	Genoa	3	(0)
2004	Venezia	25	(0)
2005–2009	Frosinone	135	(4)
2009–2010	Rimini	30	(0)
2010–2011	Ternana	27	(0)
2011–2013	Flaminia	40	(1)

Managerial career
- 2014–2015: Nuova Sorianese
- 2015–2017: Nuova Monterosi
- 2019–2021: Monterosi
- 2022–2023: Cynthialbalonga
- 2023–2024: Romana
- 2024–2025: Guidonia Montecelio
- 2025–: Ostiamare
- * Club domestic league appearances and goals as of 1 August 2025

David D'Antoni (born 28 January 1979) is an Italian football coach and former player.

He is currently in charge as head coach of Serie C club Ostiamare.

== Playing career ==
Born in Viterbo, Lazio, D'Antoni played for Ladispoli at Serie D in the Lazio region. He was then signed by Empoli and made his debut in Serie A on 25 October 1998 against U.C. Sampdoria. He then played at Serie C2 clubs and won promotion with Vis Pesaro. He then played for Salernitana, Cesena, Genoa and Venezia. In January 2005, he joined Frosinone.

In his professional career, D'Antoni played over 150 games at the Italian Serie B level.

== Coaching career ==
In 2014, D'Antoni was named the new head coach of Eccellenza amateur club Nuova Sorianese. In 2015, following his club's merger with Monterosi, he was named the head coach of the resulting new club Nuova Monterosi, with whom he won the 2015–16 Eccellenza title and guided them in the successive 2016–17 Serie D campaign.

From 2017 to 2019 he worked as youth coach of Frosinone.

In June 2019 he left Frosinone to return to Monterosi as head coach. Under his tenure, Monterosi won the 2020–21 Serie D league, thus ensuring themselves a historical first promotion to Serie C.

D'Antoni was confirmed in charge of Monterosi for the club's debut Serie C season but was relieved from his managerial duties on 9 November 2021 following a negative string of results.

In July 2022, D'Antoni was appointed the new head coach of ambitious Serie D club Cynthialbalonga. He left the club by the end of the 2022–23 Serie D season.

On 21 September 2023, D'Antoni was hired by fellow Serie D club Romana. After completing the season with Romana, he successively left for fellow Serie D club Guidonia Montecelio. On 14 January 2025, however, he was sacked with immediate effect, following a string of negative results.

On 5 July 2025, D'Antoni was announced as the new head coach of fellow Serie D club Ostiamare, owned by former Italy international Daniele De Rossi, on a two-year deal.

== Honours ==
=== Manager ===
Monterosi

- Serie D: 2020–21 (Group G)
- Eccellenza Lazio: 2015–16 (Group A, as Nuova Monterosi)
