= Marco Delle Monache =

Italian footballer (born 2005)

Personal information
- Date of birth: 3 February 2005 (age 21)
- Place of birth: Cappelle sul Tavo, Italy
- Height: 1.70 m (5 ft 7 in)
- Position: Winger

Team information
- Current team: Pineto (on loan from Lecce)
- Number: 10

Youth career
- Caldora Calcio
- 2013–2021: Pescara

Senior career*
Years	Team	Apps	(Gls)
2021–2022	Pescara	6	(0)
2022–2024	Sampdoria	6	(0)
2022–2023	→ Pescara (loan)	38	(5)
2024	→ Vicenza (loan)	17	(0)
2024–	Lecce	0	(0)
2026	→ Potenza (loan)	7	(0)
2026–	→ Pineto (loan)	2	(0)

International career^{‡}
2021–2022	Italy U17	9	(0)
2022	Italy U18	1	(0)
2023	Italy U19	5	(3)
- * Club domestic league appearances and goals as of 29 August 2026 ‡ National team caps and goals as of 14 October 2023

Marco Delle Monache (born 3 February 2005) is an Italian professional footballer who plays as an attacking midfielder or left-winger for Serie C Group B club Pineto, on loan from Lecce.

== Early life ==
Growing up in Cappelle sul Tavo, in the province of Pescara, Marco Delle Monache joined the Delfino Pescara academy in 2013, from Caldora, an amateur club in the same city.

== Club career ==
Growing through the youth ranks of Pescara, Delle Monache started playing with the Primavera team in 2021–22, before making his professional debut for the club on 15 September 2021, replacing Eugenio D'Ursi during a 2–0 Coppa Serie C home win against Grosseto.

Having become a regular starter with the under-19, as he displayed an important attacking contribution, delivering a brace of assists during a 3–1 victory to Napoli, he played his first Serie C game on 22 January 2022, playing the last minutes of a 4–2 home win against Montevarchi.

The young player signed his first professional contract with the biggest club of Abruzzo in February 2022, making him a player of the Delfino until June 2024.

On 5 August 2022, Delle Monache signed with Serie A club Sampdoria, but was immediately loaned back to Pescara for another season.

On 31 January 2024, he joined Serie C club Vicenza on loan until the end of the season. He helped the team reach the play-offs, where they eventually lost to Carrarese in the final.

On 18 July 2024, Delle Monache joined Serie A side Lecce on a permanent deal.

== International career ==
Delle Monache is a youth international for Italy, having been selected with the under-17 by Bernardo Corradi in October 2021, for the 2022 European Championship qualification. He made his debut with the team as a substitute during the 5–0 win against Albania on the 27 October.

== Style of play ==
Delle Monache is able to play both as a trequartista or an attacking winger (in Italian, an esterno offensivo), mainly on the left side of the attack.

A right-footed player, he distinguishes himself by dribbling the opponent and protecting the ball, while additionally having the ability to execute long passes, take free kicks and provide assists for his forwards. He was also praised for his athleticism and his tactical intelligence while pressing. Due to his attributes, he was compared to the likes of Pasquale Foggia, Fabrizio Miccoli and Lorenzo Insigne.

In September 2022, Delle Monache was included in The Guardian's list of the 60 best talents in the world to be born in 2005.
