= AS Ostia Mare Lido Calcio =

Italian football club

Ostiamare
- Full name: Associazione Sportiva Ostiamare Lido Calcio S.r.l.
- Founded: 1945; 81 years ago
- Ground: Stadio Anco Marzio, Lido di Ostia, Rome, Italy
- Capacity: 1,000
- Chairman: Daniele De Rossi
- Manager: David D'Antoni
- League: Serie C Group B
- 2025–26: Serie D Group F, 1st of 18 (promoted)
Home colours	Away colours

Associazione Sportiva Ostiamare Lido Calcio, commonly known as Ostiamare, is an Italian association football club located in Ostia, a frazione of Rome, Lazio. It currently plays in Serie C

== History ==
Although a company that represented what was still a village already existed in 1923 as Associazione Sportiva Ostia, the Associazione Sportiva Ostiamare Lido Calcio officially by that name existed since 1945. It played for many years in the minor leagues until 1983, when it was in the championship of Prima Categoria (then the second-level football on a regional basis), did not buy a sports title of another company by granting access to Serie D.

In the late eighties, the team reached the top step of its history in Serie C2 landing, managing to maintain in the category for two seasons (1989-90/1990-1991 championships). The reason for the golden era of those years is due to the influence and the indirect financing of AS Roma, which was looking for promising young players from Ostiamare to enhance its team (during the presidency of the Rome of the late Dino Viola). A tournament was held in the province of Rome, recalling the former president's commitment to the growth of companies in the town of Rome.

In recent years, after a few swings with the most significant regional championships (Promozione and Eccellenza), Ostiamare became a constant presence in the Serie D.

In the 2007–2008 season, Ostiamare was relegated to Eccellenza. At the end of the 2008–2009 season, in Eccellenza Lazio/A, it was saved by finishing in 9th place in the standings. The club finished in mid-table also in the following two seasons.

The 2011–2012 season was significantly different, in which Ostiamare gained promotion to Serie D after four years of absence.

On 24 January 2025, former Italy international player and Roma player and coach Daniele De Rossi became the owner and chairman of Ostiamare, thus acquiring what was his first team as a youth player.

== Colors and badge ==
Ostiamare logo used until 2023.

Its colors are white and purple.

== Players ==
=== Current squad ===
As of 4 September 2026

Note: Flags indicate national team as defined under FIFA eligibility rules; some limited exceptions apply. Players may hold more than one non-FIFA nationality.

No.	Pos.	Nation	Player
1	GK	ITA	Filippo Vertua (on loan from Empoli)
3	DF	ITA	Marco Orfano
4	DF	ITA	Danilo Piroli
5	DF	ITA	Pietro Giordani
6	MF	ITA	Davide Buono
9	FW	ITA	Riccardo Tonin
10	FW	GAM	Ismaila Badje
11	FW	ITA	Vittorio Parigini
12	GK	ITA	Alessio Fabiano
13	DF	ITA	Riccardo Brosco
14	MF	ITA	Francesco Galastri
16	MF	ITA	Matteo Gerbaudo
17	FW	ITA	Filippo D'Andrea (on loan from Pineto)
18	MF	ITA	Niccolò Felici

No.	Pos.	Nation	Player
19	FW	SEN	Ibrahima Papa Wade (on loan from Cesena)
21	MF	ITA	Danilo Greco
22	GK	ITA	Alessandro Morlupo
23	MF	ITA	Marco Spinosa
24	DF	ITA	Emanuele Tesauro
27	DF	ITA	Matteo Vagnoni
30	MF	GHA	Godfred Donsah
32	MF	ITA	Federico Casolari
36	DF	SLO	Anej Koroša (on loan from Modena)
66	DF	ITA	Antonio Castaldo
71	MF	ITA	Filippo Carbone (on loan from Genoa)
77	FW	ALB	Frederik Tosku (on loan from Cesena)
78	FW	ITA	Flavio Ferrari (on loan from Bologna)
