= Tommaso D'Orazio =

Italian footballer

Personal information
- Date of birth: 3 May 1990 (age 36)
- Place of birth: Guardiagrele, Italy
- Height: 1.85 m (6 ft 1 in)
- Position: Defender

Team information
- Current team: Pineto
- Number: 28

Youth career
- –2009: Pescara

Senior career*
Years	Team	Apps	(Gls)
2009–2010	Renato Curi Angolana		
2010–2012	Atessa Val di Sangro	67	(2)
2012–2013	Casalincontrada		
2013–2014	Giulianova	28	(1)
2014–2015	Ancona	26	(4)
2015–2017	Teramo	32	(1)
2016	→ Pistoiese (loan)	15	(0)
2017	→ Cosenza (loan)	15	(3)
2017–2020	Cosenza	84	(4)
2020–2021	Bari	15	(1)
2021	→ Ascoli (loan)	14	(0)
2021–2022	Ascoli	28	(0)
2022–2023	Südtirol	16	(0)
2023	→ Cosenza (loan)	15	(2)
2023–2026	Cosenza	73	(3)
2026–	Pineto	2	(0)
- * Club domestic league appearances and goals as of 29 August 2026

Tommaso D'Orazio (born 3 May 1990) is an Italian professional footballer who plays as a defender for Serie C Group B club Pineto.

== Club career ==
He is the product of youth teams of Pescara. The first five seasons of his senior career were spent in Serie D and Eccellenza (fourth and fifth tiers).

He made his Serie C debut for Ancona on 26 October 2014 in a game against San Marino as a starter.

On 11 January 2017, he joined Serie C club Cosenza on loan from Teramo. Cosenza signed him on a permanent basis at the end of the season, executing the option in the loan contract. For 2018–19 season, Cosenza was promoted to Serie B and D'Orazio re-signed with the club on a two-year contract.

On 17 September 2020 he signed a 2-year contract with Bari. On 21 January 2021, he was loaned to Serie B club Ascoli.

On 30 June 2021, he transferred to Ascoli on a permanent basis and signed a two-year contract.

On 28 June 2022, D'Orazio moved to newly-promoted Serie B club Südtirol on a two-year contract.

On 25 January 2023, D'Orazio returned to Cosenza on loan with an obligation to buy.
