= Giuseppe Laezza =

Italian painter (1835–1905)

Giuseppe Laezza (1835–1905) was an Italian painter, mainly of landscapes.

He resided in Naples where in 1877 he exhibited: Dopo il tramonto; San Germano; Cassino, and Una mala pesca alla Marinella. Among his works are: A Procession of Children to the Festival of Ponti Rossi, End of the Grape Harvest; Panorama of Sorrento;Curiosity of a Painter; and Un bagno pubblico a San Giovanni a Teduccio, exhibited at Turin in 1884. He became a professor at Naples. He died in poverty.
