= Manuel Sarao =

Italian footballer

Personal information
- Date of birth: 11 October 1989 (age 37)
- Place of birth: Milan, Italy
- Height: 1.92 m (6 ft 3 1/2 in)
- Position: Forward

Team information
- Current team: Gela

Senior career*
| Years | Team | Apps | (Gls) |
| 2011 | Trezzano | 2 | (0) |
| 2011 | Gallaratese | 10 | (5) |
| 2011–2012 | Seregno | 20 | (8) |
| 2012 | Gozzano | 13 | (2) |
| 2012–2013 | Lecco | 21 | (8) |
| 2013–2014 | Savona | 24 | (3) |
| 2014 | Giana Erminio | 18 | (1) |
| 2015–2016 | Lumezzane | 45 | (13) |
| 2016–2017 | Catanzaro | 25 | (5) |
| 2017–2018 | Monopoli | 33 | (9) |
| 2018–2019 | Virtus Francavilla | 36 | (11) |
| 2019–2020 | Cesena | 17 | (2) |
| 2020 | Reggina | 8 | (1) |
| 2020–2021 | Catania | 28 | (8) |
| 2021–2022 | Gubbio | 14 | (2) |
| 2022–2023 | Catania | 31 | (9) |
| 2023–2025 | Siracusa | 45 | (9) |
| 2025– | Gela | 0 | (0) |
- * Club domestic league appearances and goals as of 4 May 2025

Manuel Sarao (born 11 October 1989) is an Italian footballer who plays as a forward for Serie D club Gela.

== Club career ==
Born in Milan, the capital of the Lombardy region, Sarao was a player of Lombard clubs in 2011–12 Serie D and 2012–13 Serie D (except Gozzano in Piedmont).

Sarao joined Serie B club Carpi on 12 July 2013 He was immediately left for the third division club Savona.

Sarao made his professional debut on 4 August 2013, 0–1 lost to Perugia. The cup match he substituted Christian Esposito at half time. At the end of the season for the signature Giana Erminio; in January 2015 it is transferred to Lumezzane. In the summer of 2016 he moved to Catanzaro.

On 4 July 2018, he was released by Monopoli.

He signed a two-year contract with Virtus Francavilla on 6 July 2018.

On 30 July 2019, he signed a 2-year contract with Cesena.

On 2 January 2020, he joined Reggina on a 1.5-year contract.

On 14 September 2020 he moved to Catania on a 2-year contract.

On 18 August 2021 he signed with Gubbio.

On 11 August 2022, Sarao returned to Catania, signing a two-year contract. After having been part of the squad that won the Serie D title, he played with the Rossoblu for the first half of the 2023–24 Serie C season; he then left Catania in December 2023 to sign for Serie D club Siracusa.
