= Gaetano Vitale =

Italian footballer

Personal information
- Date of birth: 4 August 2001 (age 25)
- Place of birth: Castellamare di Stabia, Italy
- Height: 1.80 m (5 ft 11 in)
- Position: Midfielder

Team information
- Current team: Cerignola
- Number: 4

Youth career
- −2018: Sorrento

Senior career*
Years	Team	Apps	(Gls)
2018−2020	Sorrento	54	(5)
2020−2022	Salernitana	0	(0)
2020−2021	→ Foggia (loan)	32	(2)
2021−2022	→ Seregno (loan)	29	(1)
2022–2024	Monopoli	0	(0)
2022–2023	→ Gubbio (loan)	24	(0)
2023–2024	→ Sorrento (loan)	36	(4)
2024	Sorrento	0	(0)
2024–2025	Cavese	33	(3)
2025–	Cerignola	36	(5)
- * Club domestic league appearances and goals as of 1 May 2026

Gaetano Vitale (born 4 August 2001) is an Italian professional footballer who plays as midfielder for Serie C Group C club Cerignola.

== Club career ==
=== Early career ===
Vitale played for Sorrento Youth Sector. In the 2018–19 season, he was awarded as "best young player of 2018–19 Serie D", making 27 appearances and scoring three goals for Sorrento. In the 2019–20 season, he made 26 appearances and scored two goals.

=== Foggia ===
On 27 September 2020, Vitale was signed by Salernitana, and was then loaned to Foggia.

=== Seregno ===
In the summer 2021, Vitale was loaned to Seregno.

=== Monopoli ===
On 20 July 2022, Vitale signed a three-year contract with Monopoli. On 1 September 2022, he was loaned by Gubbio. On 7 July 2023, Vitale returned to Sorrento on loan with an option to buy.

=== Cavese ===
On 14 August 2024, Vitale joined Cavese, with Sorrento previously exercising their option to acquire his rights and re-sell them to Cavese.

=== Cerignola ===
On 21 August 2025, Vitale signed a three-year contract with Cerignola.

== Style of play ==
Vitale has been compared to Nicolò Barella for his excellent vision and shooting.
