= Andrea Gasbarro =

Italian footballer (born 1995)

Personal information
- Date of birth: 7 January 1995 (age 31)
- Place of birth: Pisa, Italy
- Height: 1.85 m (6 ft 1 in)
- Position: Centre-back

Team information
- Current team: Cerignola
- Number: 23

Youth career
- –2013: Livorno

Senior career*
Years	Team	Apps	(Gls)
2013–2014	Livorno	0	(0)
2013–2014	→ Pontedera (loan)	9	(0)
2014–2015	Pontedera	30	(1)
2015–2020	Livorno	105	(2)
2020	→ Pordenone (loan)	9	(0)
2020–2023	Padova	61	(0)
2023–2024	Fermana	9	(0)
2024	Virtus Francavilla	16	(1)
2024–2025	Lucchese	23	(0)
2025–	Cerignola	20	(1)

International career
2011	Italy U16	3	(0)
2015–2016	Italy U20	3	(1)
- * Club domestic league appearances and goals as of 1 May 2026

Andrea Gasbarro (born 7 January 1995) is an Italian professional footballer who plays as a centre-back for Serie C Group C club Cerignola.

== Club career ==
On 31 January 2020, he joined Pordenone on loan until June 2020 with an option to purchase.

On 25 September 2020, he signed with Padova.

On 24 October 2023, Gasbarro moved to Fermana.

On 16 July 2024, Gasbarro signed a two-season contract with Lucchese.
