= Michele D'Ausilio =

Italian footballer

Personal information
- Full name: Michele D’Ausilio Guadagno
- Date of birth: 3 September 1999 (age 27)
- Place of birth: Milan, Italy
- Height: 1.75 m (5 ft 9 in)
- Position: Midfielder

Team information
- Current team: Pescara (on loan from Avellino)
- Number: 19

Youth career
- Piacenza

Senior career*
Years	Team	Apps	(Gls)
2017–2018	Busto 81		
2018–2020	GS Arconatese	57	(12)
2020–2022	Giana Erminio	53	(3)
2022–2024	Cerignola	54	(7)
2024–	Avellino	40	(3)
2025–2026	→ Catania (loan)	32	(4)
2026	→ Iraklis (loan)	0	(0)
2026–	→ Pescara (loan)	2	(1)
- * Club domestic league appearances and goals as of 29 August 2026

Michele D'Ausilio Guadagno (born 3 March 1999) is an Italian professional footballer who plays as a midfielder for Serie C Group B club Pescara, on loan from Avellino.

== Career ==
Born in Milan, D'Ausilio started his senior career in Eccellenza club Busto 81 and Serie D club Arconatese.

On 22 September 2020, D'Ausilio joined Serie C club Giana Erminio. He made his professional debut on 26 September against Lecco.

On 30 January 2024, D'Ausilio moved to Avellino. On 10 August 2025, D'Ausilio was loaned by Catania, with an option to buy.

On 8 July 2026, D'Ausilio joined Greek side Iraklis on a yearly loan. After remaining on the bench in the season-opening cup game and before the Greek league season started, on 21 August 2026 D'Ausilio was recalled from Iraklis and moved on a new loan to Pescara.
