= Alessandro Quaini =

Italian footballer (born 1998)

Personal information
- Date of birth: 17 September 1998 (age 28)
- Place of birth: Cremona, Italy
- Height: 1.82 m (6 ft 0 in)
- Position: Midfielder

Team information
- Current team: Catania
- Number: 16

Youth career
- –2017: Genoa

Senior career*
Years	Team	Apps	(Gls)
2017–2019	Genoa	0	(0)
2017–2018	→ Fondi (loan)	28	(0)
2018–2019	→ Pro Piacenza (loan)	4	(0)
2019	→ Renate (loan)	15	(0)
2019–2022	Pisa	13	(0)
2019–2020	→ AlbinoLeffe (loan)	22	(0)
2022	→ Monopoli (loan)	3	(0)
2022–2023	Fiorenzuola	35	(0)
2023–	Catania	91	(1)
- * Club domestic league appearances and goals as of 1 May 2026

Alessandro Quaini (born 17 September 1998) is an Italian professional footballer who plays as a midfielder for Serie C Group C club Catania.

== Club career ==
=== Genoa ===
Born in Cremona, Quaini was a youth exponent of Genoa.

==== Loan to Fondi ====
On 16 August 2017, Quaini was signed by Serie C club Fondi on a season-long loan deal. On 2 September he made his professional debut in Serie C for Fondi as a substitute replacing Luca Ricciardi in the 64th minute of a 1–0 home defeat against Monopoli. On 7 October, Quaini played his first entire match for the club, a 1–0 away defeat against Matera. He became Fondi's first-choice early in the season. On 4 November he received his first red card in his career in the 65th minute of a 1–1 away draw against Cosenza. Quaini ended his loan to Fondi with 28 appearances, including 19 as a starter, and 1 assist, however Fondi was relegated in Serie D after a 4–3 defeat on aggregate against Paganese in the Serie C play-out.

==== Loan to Pro Piacenza and Renate ====
On 21 July 2018, Quaini was loaned to Serie C club Pro Piacenza on a season-long loan deal. On 23 September he made his Serie C debut for Pro Piacenza in a 3–1 away win over Alessandria, he was replaced by Giulio Sanseverino in the 75th minute. On 21 October he played his first entire match for Pro Piacenza, a 1–0 home defeat against Cuneo. He made 2 other appearances for the club, against Albissola and Cuneo. His loan was terminated during the 2018–19 season winter break and Quaini returned to Genoa leaving Pro Piacenza with only 4 appearances, 2 as a starter and 2 as a substitute.

On 26 January 2019, Quani was signed by another Serie C side, Renate, on a 6-month loan deal. On the same day he made his league debut for Renate as a substitute replacing Reno Piscopo in the 77th minute of a 1–1 away draw against Fermana. On 12 February, Quaini played his first match as a starter for the club, a 1–0 away win over Virtus Verona, he was replaced by Giusto Priola in the 89th minute. Three weeks later, on 3 March, he played his first entire match, a 1–0 home defeat against Ravenna. Quaini ended his 6-month loan to Renate with 15 appearances, including 10 as a starter.

=== Pisa ===
On 24 July 2019, Quaini joined to newly promoted Serie B club Pisa for a free-transfer.

==== Loan to AlbinoLeffe ====
One day later, Quaini was loaned to Serie C club AlbinoLeffe on a season-long loan deal. On 25 August he made his debut for the club as a substitute replacing Mario Ravasio in the 73rd minute of a 2–1 away win over Pistoiese. On 15 September, Quaini played his first match as a starter for AlbinoLeffe, a 0–0 home draw against Pianese, he was replaced by Simone Canestrelli after 50 minutes. Ten days later, on 25 September, he played his first entire match, a 1–1 home draw against Juventus U23. Quaini ended his season-long loan to AlbinoLeffe with 22 appearances, however he played only 3 entire matches during the season.

==== Loan to Monopoli ====
On 31 January 2022, Quaini joined Monopoli on loan.

=== Fiorenzuola ===
On 27 August 2022, Quaini signed a one-season contract with Fiorenzuola.

=== Catania ===
On 22 August 2023, Quaini joined Catania.

== Career statistics ==
=== Club ===
As of 16 July 2020

Club	Season	League			Cup		Europe		Other		Total	
Club	Season	League	Apps	Goals	Apps	Goals	Apps	Goals	Apps	Goals	Apps	Goals
Fondi (loan)	2017–18	Serie C	28	0	0	0	—		—		28	0
Pro Piacenza (loan)	2018–19	Serie C	4	0	0	0	—		—		4	0
Renate (loan)	2018–19	Serie C	15	0	—		—		—		15	0
AlbinoLeffe (loan)	2019–20	Serie C	22	0	0	0	—		—		22	0
Career total			69	0	0	0	—		—		69	0
