= Giuliano Laezza =

Italian footballer

Personal information
- Date of birth: 23 December 1993 (age 32)
- Place of birth: Naples, Italy
- Height: 1.78 m (5 ft 10 in)
- Position: Defender

Team information
- Current team: Giugliano
- Number: 23

Youth career
- Napoli

Senior career*
Years	Team	Apps	(Gls)
2012–2013	Arzanese	33	(0)
2013–2014	Gubbio	14	(0)
2014–2015	Savoia	3	(0)
2016	Agropoli	18	(0)
2016–2017	AS Melfi	38	(2)
2017–2018	Reggina	29	(2)
2018–2019	Sicula Leonzio	32	(2)
2019–2021	Avellino	29	(0)
2021–2023	Reggiana	28	(2)
2023–2025	Vicenza	55	(0)
2025–	Giugliano	25	(0)
- * Club domestic league appearances and goals as of 1 May 2026

Giuliano Laezza (born 23 December 1993) is an Italian professional footballer who plays for Serie C Group C club Giugliano.

== Biography ==
Born in Naples, Campania, Laezza started his career at Napoli.

=== Arzanese ===
In January 2012 he was signed by Serie C2 club Arzanese.

=== Gubbio ===
In July 2013 Laezza was signed by Parma for €75,000. He was immediately left for Gubbio in co-ownership deal for €200,000, in 3-year contract, along with Ferrari (for €300,000), as part of the deal that Parma signed Procacci (€200,000 in co-ownership) and Damiano (€300,000 definitive). However Gubbio also received premi di valorizzazione for the loans of Procacci (€100,000), Domini (€100,000), Moroni (€110,000), Caccavallo (€110,000), Pisseri (€110,000) and Damiano (€150,000) from Parma. Laezza made his Gubbio debut in a pre-season friendly.

In June 2014 Gubbio acquired Laezza outright for €200,000, as well as Parma bought Procacci outright for €200,000; Ferrari also returned to Parma for €200,000. (Note: Gubbio listed the €400,000 selling profit of Procacci as financial income of co-ownership, as well as the €100,000 discount of Ferrari (€300,000 co-ownership debt minus actual fee €200,000). The fee of Laezza unchanged thus no financial income or cost generated.)

Laezza was a member of Gubbio for their 2014 pre-season camp. However, he was sold on 4 August.

=== Savoia ===
On 4 August 2014 he was signed by Savoia for undisclosed fee.

=== Sicula Leonzio ===
On 29 July 2018, he joined Sicula Leonzio in Serie C.

=== Avellino ===
On 10 August 2019, he signed with Avellino. On 21 September 2020, he suffered an ACL injury that kept him out of play for most of the 2020–21 season. He returned to action in April 2021. On 14 July 2021, his contract with Avellino was terminated by mutual consent.

=== Reggiana ===
On 14 July 2021, he moved to Reggiana on a two-year deal.

=== Vicenza ===
On 15 July 2023, Laezza joined Vicenza on a two-year contract.
