= Riccardo Tonin =

Italian footballer

Personal information
- Date of birth: 30 January 2001 (age 25)
- Place of birth: Arzignano, Italy
- Height: 1.80 m (5 ft 11 in)
- Position: Forward

Team information
- Current team: Ostiamare
- Number: 9

Youth career
- ASD Calcio Trissino
- 2015–2021: AC Milan

Senior career*
Years	Team	Apps	(Gls)
2021–2022	AC Milan	0	(0)
2021–2022	→ Cesena (loan)	23	(1)
2022–2024	Foggia	45	(6)
2023	→ Monterosi (loan)	17	(1)
2024	Juve Stabia	0	(0)
2024–2026	Pescara	36	(3)
2026	→ Südtirol (loan)	11	(0)
2026–	Ostiamare	1	(0)

International career^{‡}
2016	Italy U15	8	(1)
2016–2017	Italy U16	10	(4)
2017–2018	Italy U17	10	(1)
2018–2019	Italy U18	3	(0)
- * Club domestic league appearances and goals as of 23 August 2026 ‡ National team caps and goals as of 6 September 2021

Riccardo Tonin (born 30 January 2001) is an Italian professional footballer who plays as a forward for Serie C Group B club Ostiamare.

== Club career ==
Tonin was raised in the AC Milan youth system and began receiving call-ups to the senior squad in March 2021, but remained on the bench on those occasions.

On 29 July 2021, he joined Cesena on a season-long loan.

On 19 July 2022, Tonin signed a two-year deal with Foggia. On 13 January 2023, Tonin was loaned by Monterosi.

In July 2024, Tonin joined Juve Stabia in Serie B on a two-year contract.

On 30 August 2024, Tonin signed a three-year contract with Pescara. On 2 February 2026, he was loaned by Südtirol.

== Personal life ==
His younger brother Federico Tonin plays for Bologna FC 1909, after a stint at LR Vicenza.
