= Filippo D'Andrea =

Italian footballer

Personal information
- Date of birth: 25 September 1998 (age 28)
- Place of birth: Rome, Italy
- Height: 1.80 m (5 ft 11 in)
- Position: Forward

Team information
- Current team: Ostiamare (on loan from Pineto)
- Number: 17

Senior career*
Years	Team	Apps	(Gls)
2016–2017	US Tor di Quinto	0	(0)
2017–2020	Terme Fiuggi	78	(30)
2020–2022	Salernitana	0	(0)
2020–2021	→ Foggia (loan)	33	(4)
2021–2022	→ Seregno (loan)	15	(1)
2022	→ Teramo (loan)	18	(5)
2022–2024	Cerignola	68	(20)
2024–2026	Catania	17	(1)
2025	→ Cerignola (loan)	11	(1)
2025–2026	→ Pineto (loan)	33	(5)
2026–	Pineto	0	(0)
2026–	→ Ostiamare (loan)	1	(0)
- * Club domestic league appearances and goals as of 23 August 2026

Filippo D'Andrea (born 25 September 1998) is an Italian professional footballer who plays as a forward for Serie C Group B club Ostiamare on loan from Pineto.

== Club career ==
Born in Rome, D'Andrea started his senior career with Serie D club Terme Fiuggi. He left the club at the end of 2019–20 season, and signed for Salernitana.

On 2 October 2020, he was loaned to Foggia.

On 18 August 2021, he joined Seregno on loan. On 21 January 2022, he moved on a new loan to Teramo.

On 24 August 2022, D'Andrea signed with Cerignola.

On 18 July 2024, D'Andrea moved to Catania on a three-year deal.
