= Davide Marsura =

Italian footballer (born 1994)

Personal information
- Date of birth: 20 February 1994 (age 32)
- Place of birth: Valdobbiadene, Italy
- Height: 1.87 m (6 ft 2 in)
- Position: Winger

Youth career
- Udinese

Senior career*
Years	Team	Apps	(Gls)
2012–2013	Udinese	0	(0)
2013–2014	→ FeralpiSalò (loan)	27	(8)
2014–2015	→ Modena (loan)	10	(0)
2015–2016	→ Brescia (loan)	18	(1)
2016–2019	Venezia	77	(13)
2019	Carpi	15	(1)
2019–2021	Livorno	35	(7)
2021–2022	Pisa	34	(5)
2022–2023	Modena	10	(1)
2023	Ascoli	13	(3)
2023–2025	Catania	24	(1)
2024–2025	→ Ascoli (loan)	33	(1)

International career
2010	Italy U16	3	(0)
2011	Italy U17	2	(0)
2014	Italy U20	1	(0)
- * Club domestic league appearances and goals as of 24 August 2025

Davide Marsura (born 20 February 1994) is an Italian professional footballer who plays as a winger.

== Club career ==
On 16 January 2019, he signed with Carpi until the end of the 2018–19 season, with an option for another year.

On 1 July 2019, Marsura signed to Livorno.

On 15 January 2021, Marsura signed with Serie B club Pisa.

On 2 September 2022, Marsura returned to Modena on a one-year deal. On 31 January 2023, he moved to Ascoli.

On 9 August 2023, Marsura signed with Catania. On 5 August 2024, Marsura returned to Ascoli on loan.
