= Alessandro Livieri =

Italian football player (born 1997)

Personal information
- Date of birth: 21 January 1997 (age 29)
- Place of birth: Milan, Italy
- Height: 1.90 m (6 ft 3 in)
- Position: Goalkeeper

Team information
- Current team: Pro Vercelli
- Number: 97

Youth career
- –2016: AC Milan

Senior career*
Years	Team	Apps	(Gls)
2015–2016	AC Milan	0	(0)
2016–2019	Feralpisalò	39	(0)
2019–2025	Pisa	15	(0)
2020	→ Lecco (loan)	4	(0)
2020–2021	→ Pro Sesto (loan)	38	(0)
2023–2024	→ Catania (loan)	5	(0)
2024	→ Cremonese (loan)	0	(0)
2024–2025	→ Ascoli (loan)	23	(0)
2025–	Pro Vercelli	30	(0)
- * Club domestic league appearances and goals as of 30 April 2026

Alessandro Livieri (born 21 January 1997) is an Italian professional footballer who plays as a goalkeeper for Serie C Group A club Pro Vercelli.

== Club career ==
He was raised in the youth teams of AC Milan. In the 2015–16 season, he began to be included in the senior squad, but did not see any time on the field, serving as a back-up, mostly to Gianluigi Donnarumma.

Before the next season, he moved to Feralpisalò in Serie C. He made his professional debut in Serie C for Feralpisalò on 1 October 2016 against Forlì.

On 7 September 2019, he signed with Pisa. He spent most of the following two seasons on loans at Serie C.

On 11 December 2021, he made his Serie B debut for Pisa against Lecce, keeping a clean sheet. On 24 January 2022, he extended his contract with Pisa until 2024.

On 5 August 2023, Livieri moved on loan to Catania, with an option to buy. On 17 January 2024, he was loaned by Cremonese, with an option to buy. On 14 August 2024, Livieri joined Ascoli on loan, with a conditional obligation to buy.
