= AS Pineto Calcio =

Italian football club

Pineto
- Full name: Associazione Sportiva Dilettantistica; Pineto Calcio
- Nickname: Biancazzurri
- Founded: 1962; 64 years ago
- Ground: Stadio Mariani-Pavone, Pineto, Italy
- Capacity: 1,000
- Chairman: Silvio Brocco
- Manager: Enrico Barilari
- League: Serie C Group B
- 2025–26: Serie C Group B, 7th of 20
Home colours	Away colours

Associazione Sportiva Dilettantistica Pineto Calcio, commonly known as Pineto, is an Italian association football club from Pineto, Abruzzo. They currently play in the Serie C league.

== History ==
Founded in 1962, Pineto have been playing in the amateur leagues of Italian football throughout their whole history. In 1977, they obtained their first promotion to Serie D, playing the Italian amateur top flight for a lone season before their return in 1983. They played Serie D until 1994, and again from 1995 to 1997, before being relegated into the lower ranks of Italian football.

In 2016, after winning the Eccellenza national promotion playoffs, Pineto were promoted back to Serie D after an 18-year absence.

In the 2022–23 Serie D season, Pineto turned out to be heavy contender for a historical promotion to Serie C, and also reached the final of the Coppa Italia Serie D tournament, the very first time for a club from Abruzzo. On 7 May 2023, Pineto won the Serie D Group F, thus ensuring promotion to Serie C for the first time in the club's history. They ended the season by winning the 2022–23 Coppa Italia Serie D, defeating Giana Erminio in the final.

== Current squad ==
As of 30 August 2026

Note: Flags indicate national team as defined under FIFA eligibility rules; some limited exceptions apply. Players may hold more than one non-FIFA nationality.

No.	Pos.	Nation	Player
1	GK	ITA	Claudio Turi (on loan from Napoli)
2	DF	ARG	Mateo Scheffer Bracco
3	DF	ITA	Simone Ienco
4	MF	ITA	Giulio Nebuloso
5	DF	ITA	Giovanni Di Renzo
7	FW	ITA	Giuseppe Guadagni
8	MF	ITA	Gianluca Germinario
9	FW	ITA	Gianluca Vigliotti (on loan from Napoli)
10	FW	ITA	Marco Delle Monache (on loan from Lecce)
13	DF	ITA	Giovanni Alessandretti
15	MF	ITA	Daniel Ferrante
18	MF	ITA	Marco Oliva
19	FW	ITA	Silvano Biggi

No.	Pos.	Nation	Player
21	MF	ITA	Luca Lombardi
22	GK	ITA	Alessandro Tonti
23	DF	MAR	Anass Serbouti
28	DF	ITA	Tommaso D'Orazio
30	MF	ITA	Pasquale Iaccarino
41	MF	DEN	Ank Bølling Asmussen
52	DF	ITA	Domenico Frare
70	FW	ITA	Riccardo Forte
77	FW	ITA	Simone Ardizzone (on loan from Catanzaro)
99	MF	ITA	Alessandro Pellegrino
—	DF	ITA	Francesco Corradini (on loan from Sassuolo)
—	FW	ITA	Federico Mastropietro
—	FW	ITA	Alessandro Selvini

=== Out on loan ===
Note: Flags indicate national team as defined under FIFA eligibility rules; some limited exceptions apply. Players may hold more than one non-FIFA nationality.

No.	Pos.	Nation	Player
—	GK	ITA	Adriano Verna (at Giulianova until 30 June 2027)
—	MF	ITA	Luca Schirone (at Cesena until 30 June 2027)

No.	Pos.	Nation	Player
—	FW	ITA	Filippo D'Andrea (at Ostiamare until 30 June 2027)

== Honours ==
- Serie D

- Champions (1): 2022–23

- Coppa Italia Serie D

- Champions (1): 2022–23
