= Stadio Città di Arezzo =

Stadium in Arezzo, Tuscany, Italy

- Di Arezzo
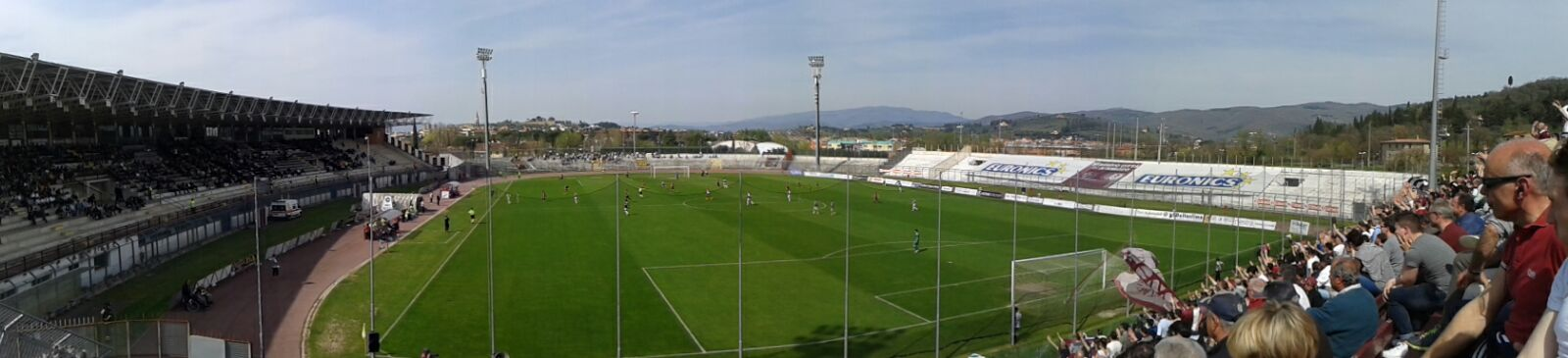
- Interactive map of Stadio Città di Arezzo
- Former names: Stadio Comunale (1923–2006)
- Location: Arezzo, Tuscany, Italy
- Coordinates: 43°27′4″N 11°53′40″E
- Owner: Municipality of Arezzo
- Capacity: 13,128
- Surface: Grass

Construction
- Groundbreaking: 1959
- Opened: 1961

Tenant
- U.S. Arezzo

Stadio Città di Arezzo (formerly Stadio Comunale) is a multi-purpose stadium, located in Arezzo, Tuscany, Italy. It is used mostly for football matches and is the home of the SS Arezzo football club. It has a grass playing surface and a 13,128-seating capacity.

== See also ==
- 1923 in architecture
- List of football stadiums in Italy
