= Diego Peralta (Argentine footballer) =

Argentine footballer

Personal information
- Date of birth: 27 September 1996 (age 30)
- Place of birth: Posadas, Argentina
- Height: 1.70 m (5 ft 7 in)
- Position: Forward

Team information
- Current team: Livorno
- Number: 8

Youth career
- 2012–2015: Fiorentina

Senior career*
Years	Team	Apps	(Gls)
2015–2018	Pisa	70	(3)
2018	→ Extremadura B (loan)	1	(0)
2018	→ Extremadura (loan)	2	(0)
2018–2020	Novara	31	(3)
2019	→ Olbia (loan)	13	(2)
2020–2022	Ternana	43	(6)
2022–2024	Foggia	51	(5)
2024–2025	Catania	11	(0)
2024–2025	→ Trento (loan)	31	(1)
2025–	Livorno	25	(2)
- * Club domestic league appearances and goals as of 30 April 2026

Diego Peralta (born 27 September 1996) is a professional footballer who plays for Serie C Group B club Livorno. He also holds Italian citizenship.

== Club career ==
He made his professional debut in the Lega Pro for Pisa on 6 September 2015 in a game against Prato.

On 22 January 2019 he joined Olbia on loan.

On 12 September 2020 he signed a 2-year contract with Ternana.

On 19 July 2022, Peralta moved to Foggia on a two-year deal.

On 7 August 2024, Peralta was loaned by Trento.
