= Roberto Zammarini =

Italian footballer

Personal information
- Date of birth: 5 July 1996 (age 30)
- Place of birth: Casalmaggiore, Italy
- Height: 1.80 m (5 ft 11 in)
- Position: Midfielder

Team information
- Current team: Giugliano
- Number: 4

Youth career
- 2006–2014: Mantova

Senior career*
Years	Team	Apps	(Gls)
2014–2017	Mantova	63	(6)
2017–2021	Pisa	36	(1)
2018	→ Pordenone (loan)	16	(5)
2019	→ Pordenone (loan)	15	(1)
2019–2020	→ Pordenone (loan)	19	(0)
2020–2021	→ Pordenone (loan)	29	(4)
2021–2023	Pordenone	70	(3)
2023–2024	Catania	35	(3)
2024–2025	SPAL	36	(0)
2025–	Giugliano	35	(5)
- * Club domestic league appearances and goals as of 1 May 2026

Roberto Zammarini (born 5 July 1996) is an Italian professional footballer who plays as a midfielder for Serie C Group C club Giugliano.

== Club career ==
He made his professional debut in the Lega Pro for Mantova on 30 August 2014 in a game against Alessandria.

On 9 January 2017, he joined Pisa.

On 31 January 2019, he joined Pordenone on loan for the second time.

On 13 August 2019, he joined Pordenone on his third loan until June 2020, with an option to purchase.

On 5 October 2020, he went to Pordenone on loan for the fourth time.

On 14 June 2021, Pordenone exercised their purchase option in the loan contract, Zammarini signed a three-year contract with the club.

On 22 July 2023, Zammarini joined Catania.

On 8 August 2024, Zammarini signed a two-season contract with SPAL.
