= Shaka Mawuli =

Ghanaian footballer

Personal information
- Full name: Eklu Shaka Mawuli
- Date of birth: 16 May 1998 (age 28)
- Place of birth: Sunyani, Ghana
- Height: 1.85 m (6 ft 1 in)
- Position: Midfielder

Team information
- Current team: Arezzo
- Number: 8

Youth career
- –2015: Serino
- 2015–2017: SPAL

Senior career*
| Years | Team | Apps | (Gls) |
| 2016–2020 | SPAL | 0 | (0) |
| 2017–2018 | → Fano (loan) | 31 | (2) |
| 2018–2019 | → Catanzaro (loan) | 18 | (2) |
| 2019–2020 | → ViOn Zlaté Moravce (loan) | 0 | (0) |
| 2020 | Ravenna | 8 | (0) |
| 2020–2021 | Sambenedettese | 19 | (0) |
| 2021–2022 | Lucchese | 16 | (2) |
| 2022–2025 | Südtirol | 8 | (0) |
| 2023–2025 | → Arezzo (loan) | 66 | (5) |
| 2025– | Arezzo | 33 | (1) |
- * Club domestic league appearances and goals as of 30 April 2026

Eklu Shaka Mawuli, known as Shaka Mawuli (born 16 May 1998) is a Ghanaian footballer who plays as a midfielder for Serie B club Arezzo.

== Career ==
Mawuli made his Serie C debut for Fano on 27 August 2017, in a game against Bassano.

On 25 July 2018, he joined Catanzaro on loan for the 2018–19 season. The loan agreement had an option for Catanzaro to extend the loan for another year at the end of the season.

On 6 September 2019, Mawuli was loaned to ViOn Zlaté Moravce. He solely played a single half of a Slovnaft Cup fixture against second division Slavoj Trebišov.

On 7 January 2020, he signed for Serie C club Ravenna until 30 June 2020.

On 8 September 2020, Mawuli signed a two-year contract with Sambenedettese.

On 12 August 2021, he moved to Lucchese on a two-year deal.

On 17 January 2022, Mawuli signed a two-and-a-half-year contract with Südtirol.

On 8 July 2023, he joined Arezzo on loan.

On 26 June 2024, Mawuli returned to Arezzo on loan, with an added obligation to buy.
