= Ismet Sinani =

Football player

Personal information
- Full name: Ismet Nderim Sinani
- Date of birth: 31 May 1999 (age 27)
- Place of birth: Belluno, Italy
- Height: 1.85 m (6 ft 1 in)
- Position: Forward

Team information
- Current team: UTA Arad
- Number: 7

Youth career
- –2013: Montebelluna
- 2013–2018: AC Milan

Senior career*
| Years | Team | Apps | (Gls) |
| 2018–2020 | AC Milan | 0 | (0) |
| 2018–2019 | → Juve Stabia (loan) | 4 | (0) |
| 2019–2020 | → Sicula Leonzio (loan) | 1 | (0) |
| 2021 | Union San Giorgio | 18 | (3) |
| 2021–2022 | Levico Terme | 29 | (14) |
| 2022–2023 | Virtus Verona | 12 | (0) |
| 2023 | Legnago | 14 | (1) |
| 2023–2025 | Clodiense | 68 | (12) |
| 2025–2026 | Bra | 28 | (7) |
| 2026– | UTA Arad | 13 | (1) |

International career^{‡}
| 2015 | Albania U17 | 5 | (0) |
| 2017 | Albania U19 | 4 | (0) |
| 2018 | Kosovo U19 | 3 | (0) |
- * Club domestic league appearances and goals as of 6 November 2026 ‡ National team caps and goals as of 27 March 2018

Ismet Nderim Sinani (born 31 May 1999) is a professional footballer who plays as a forward for Liga I club UTA Arad. Born in Italy, he represented Albania internationally at youth level before switching his allegiance to Kosovo.

== Early life ==
Sinani was born in Belluno, Italy to Kosovo Albanian parents from Rahovec.

He holds Kosovan, Albanian and Italian passports. From an early age he dreamed of being a football player, and in just a few years he went from the fields of Belluno to Milan. At 16, he signed his first professional contract for three years and then renewed it for three more until 2021. He relaunched at US Levico Terme to return after just one season in the professional ranks at Virtus Verona.

== Club career ==
=== AC Milan ===
In 2013, Sinani joined the youth team of AC Milan and he played for their under-19 squad, beginning in the 2015–16 season.

==== Loan to Juve Stabia ====
On 31 August 2018, Sinani joined Serie C side Juve Stabia, on a season-long loan. On 30 September 2018, he made his debut in a 1–3 away win against Paganese after coming on as a substitute at 77th minute in place of Salvatore Elia.

==== Loan to Sicula Leonzio ====
At the start of the 2019–20 season, Sinani was loaned out to Serie C side Sicula Leonzio with an option to make the deal permanent.

=== Virtus Verona ===
After two seasons in Serie D, in June 2022 Sinani returned to Serie C at Virtus Verona. On 27 January 2023, Sinani's contract with Virtus Verona was terminated by mutual consent.

=== Legnago ===
On 28 January 2023, Sinani moved to Serie D club Legnago.

== International career ==
=== Albania ===
On 6 April 2015, Sinani was named as part of the Albania U17 squad for 2015 Tournament of Nations, which was held in Gradisca d'Isonzo, Italy from 24 April–2 May 2015. On 25 April 2015, he made his debut with Albania U17 in a match against Mexico U15 after being named in the starting line-up.

On 22 October 2015, Sinani made his debut with Albania U17 in a 2016 UEFA European Under-17 Championship qualification match against Switzerland U17 after being named in the starting line-up.

=== Kosovo ===
On 17 March 2018, Sinani was named as part of the Kosovo U19 squad for 2018 UEFA European Under-19 Championship elite qualifications. On 21 March 2018, he made his debut with Kosovo U19 in a match against Portugal U19 after coming on as a substitute at 53rd minute in place of Lirim Kastrati.

== Career statistics ==
=== Club ===
As of match played 6 November 2026

Appearances and goals by club, season and competition
| Club | Season | League | | | National cup (Note: Includes Coppa Italia Serie C, Coppa Italia Serie D, Cupa României) | | Europe | | Other | | Total | |
| Club | Season | Division | Apps | Goals | Apps | Goals | Apps | Goals | Apps | Goals | Apps | Goals |
|---|---|---|---|---|---|---|---|---|---|---|---|---|
| Juve Stabia (loan) | 2018–19 | Serie C | 4 | 0 | 2 | 0 | — | | 1 (Note: Appearance in Supercoppa di Serie C) | 0 | 7 | 0 |
| Sicula Leonzio (loan) | 2019–20 | Serie C | 1 | 0 | 2 | 0 | — | | 0 | 0 | 3 | 0 |
| Union San Giorgio | 2020–21 | Serie D | 18 | 3 | — | | — | | — | | 18 | 3 |
| Levico Terme | 2021–22 | Serie D | 29 | 14 | 3 | 2 | — | | — | | 32 | 17 |
| Virtus Verona | 2022–23 | Serie C | 12 | 0 | 0 | 0 | — | | — | | 3 | 0 |
| Legnago | 2022–23 | Serie D | 14 | 1 | — | | — | | 2 (Note: Appearances in Poule Scudetto) | 0 | 16 | 1 |
| Clodiense | 2023–24 | Serie D | 32 | 7 | 4 | 2 | — | | 2 | 0 | 38 | 9 |
| Clodiense | 2024–25 | Serie C | 36 | 5 | 1 | 0 | — | | — | | 37 | 5 |
| Clodiense | Total | | 68 | 12 | 5 | 2 | — | | 2 | 0 | 75 | 14 |
| Bra | 2025–26 | Serie C | 28 | 7 | 1 | 1 | — | | 2 (Note: Appearances in Serie C relegation play-outs) | 1 | 31 | 9 |
| UTA Arad | 2026–27 | Liga I | 13 | 1 | 2 | 0 | — | | — | | 15 | 1 |
| Career total | | | 187 | 38 | 15 | 5 | — | | 7 | 1 | 209 | 44 |

== Honours ==
Juve Stabia

- Serie C: 2018–19 (group C)

Legnago

- Serie D: 2022–23 (group C)

Clodiense

- Serie D: 2023–24 (group C)
