= Luca Chierico =

Italian footballer (born 2001)

Personal information
- Date of birth: 26 September 2001 (age 25)
- Place of birth: Rome, Italy
- Height: 1.76 m (5 ft 9 in)
- Position: Midfielder

Team information
- Current team: Arezzo
- Number: 24

Youth career
- –2021: Roma
- 2021: Genoa

Senior career*
Years	Team	Apps	(Gls)
2021–2024	Genoa	0	(0)
2021	→ Reggina (loan)	1	(0)
2021–2022	→ Olbia (loan)	33	(0)
2022–2023	→ Foggia (loan)	8	(0)
2023	→ Piacenza (loan)	13	(1)
2023–2024	→ Gubbio (loan)	30	(2)
2024–	Arezzo	51	(5)

International career^{‡}
2019	Italy U19	1	(0)
- * Club domestic league appearances and goals as of 30 April 2026 ‡ National team caps and goals as of 11 October 2019

Luca Chierico (born 26 September 2001) is an Italian professional footballer who plays as a midfielder for Serie B club Arezzo.

== Club career ==
Born in Rome, Chierico started his career in local club Roma youth sector.

On 26 January 2021, he signed with Genoa.

On 1 February 2021, he was loaned to Serie B club . Chierico made his Serie B debut on 10 May 2021 against Frosione as a late substitute.

For the 2021–22 season, he was loaned to Serie C club Olbia.

On 31 August 2022, Chierico moved on a new loan to Foggia. On 5 January 2023, he was loaned to Piacenza.

On 30 August 2024, Chierico signed a two-season contract with Arezzo.

== International career ==
On 11 October 2019 Chierico played a match for Italy U19 against Portugal U19.

== Personal life ==
His father Odoacre was also a footballer.
