= Miloš Bočić =

Serbian footballer

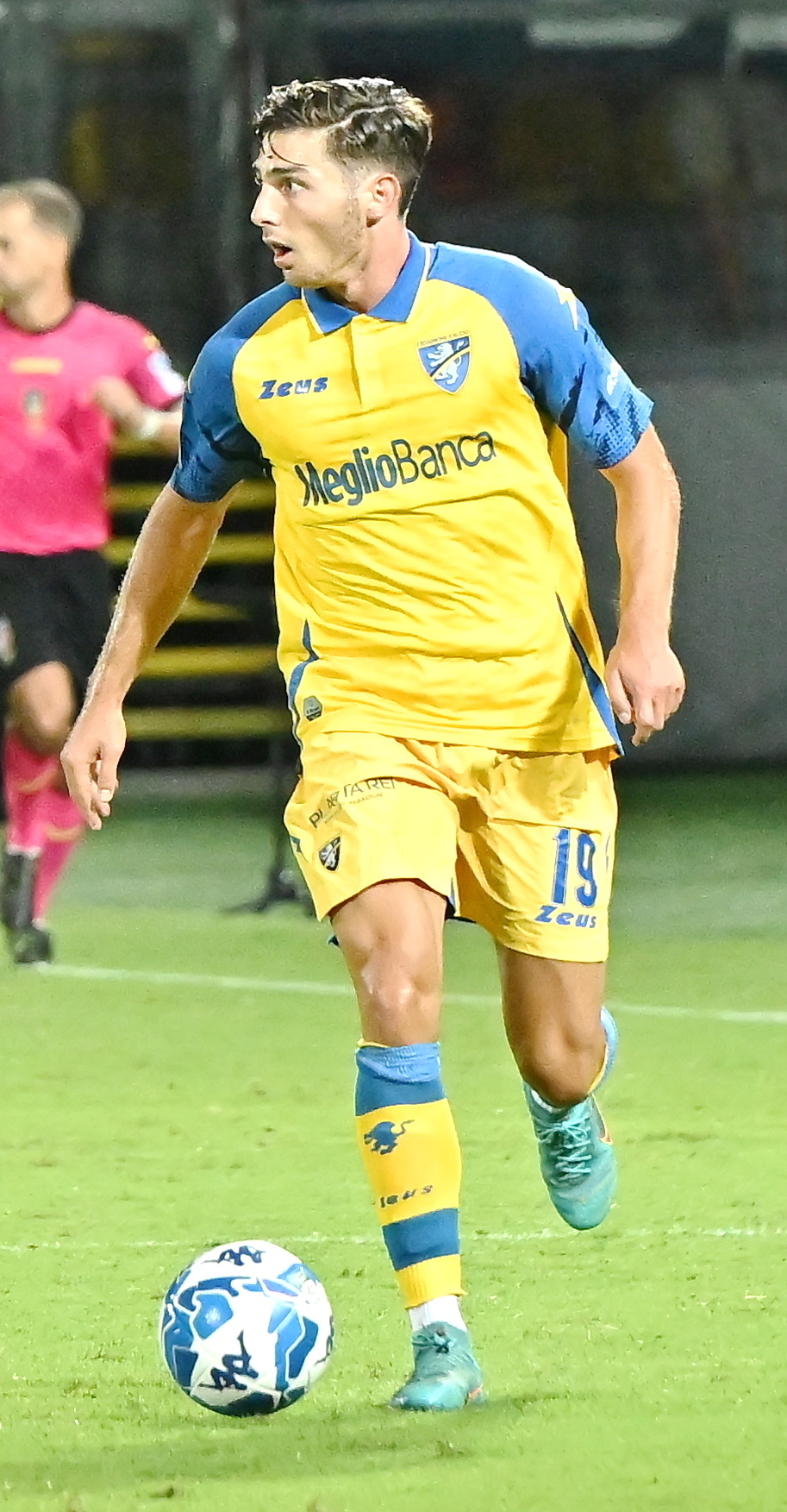

Personal information
- Date of birth: 26 January 2000 (age 26)
- Place of birth: Belgrade, Serbia
- Height: 1.73 m (5 ft 8 in)
- Position: Forward

Team information
- Current team: Team Altamura
- Number: 14

Youth career
- Udinese

Senior career*
Years	Team	Apps	(Gls)
2019	Udinese	0	(0)
2019–2023	Pescara	29	(1)
2021	→ Pro Sesto (loan)	10	(1)
2022	→ Pistoiese (loan)	13	(3)
2022–2023	→ Frosinone (loan)	12	(0)
2023–2026	Catania	15	(1)
2024	→ Fiorenzuola (loan)	12	(0)
2024	→ Taranto (loan)	0	(0)
2024–2025	→ Latina (loan)	24	(2)
2025–2026	→ Picerno (loan)	15	(1)
2026–	Team Altamura	1	(0)
- * Club domestic league appearances and goals as of 29 August 2026

Miloš Bočić (Serbian Cyrillic: Милош Бочић; born 26 January 2000) is a Serbian professional footballer who plays as a forward for Serie C Group C club Team Altamura.

== Club career ==
He is a product of youth teams of Udinese and appeared on the bench on several occasions in the spring of 2019 for 2018–19 Serie A games but did not see any time on the field.

On 31 August 2019, he signed with Serie B club Pescara.

He made his Serie B debut for Pescara on 22 December 2019 in a game against Trapani. He substituted Ledian Memushaj in the 89th minute. On 3 February 2020, he scored his first professional goal, an added-time winner in a 2–1 victory over Cosenza. On 14 February 2020, he appeared in the starting line-up for the first time in a game against Cittadella.

On 21 January 2021, he joined Serie C club Pro Sesto on loan.

On 31 January 2022 Bočić was loaned to Pistoiese.

On 5 August 2022, he moved to Frosinone on loan with an option to buy.

On 22 July 2023, he moved to Catania. On 1 February 2024, Bočić was loaned by Fiorenzuola.

On 18 July 2024, he joined fellow Serie C club Taranto on loan. On 14 August 2024, Bočić moved on a new loan to Latina instead.
