= Mario Ravasio =

Italian footballer

Personal information
- Date of birth: 19 July 1998 (age 28)
- Place of birth: Bergamo, Italy
- Height: 1.84 m (6 ft 0 in)
- Position: Forward

Team information
- Current team: Foggia (on loan from Arezzo)
- Number: 91

Youth career
- –2016: AlbinoLeffe

Senior career*
Years	Team	Apps	(Gls)
2016–2022	AlbinoLeffe	100	(8)
2022–2024	Lucchese	25	(3)
2023–2024	→ Sorrento (loan)	38	(12)
2024–2025	Cittadella	21	(1)
2025–2026	Arezzo	45	(11)
2026–	→ Foggia (loan)	0	(0)
- * Club domestic league appearances and goals as of 30 April 2026

Mario Ravasio (born 19 July 1998) is an Italian professional footballer who plays as a forward for Serie C Group C club Foggia, on loan from Arezzo.

== Career ==
=== AlbinoLeffe ===
On 19 March 2016, Ravasio made his professional debut, in Serie C, for AlbinoLeffe, as a substitute replacing Riccardo Stronati in the 68th minute of a 3–1 away defeat against FeralpiSalò. On 9 April he played his first match for AlbinoLeffe as a starter, a 2–0 away defeat against Renate, he was replaced by Pablo Ezequiel Banegas in the 60th minute. On 30 April 2017, Ravasio scored his first professional goal in the 10th minute of a 1–1 away draw against Venezia. On 30 July 2017, he played his first match in the Coppa Italia and he scored in a 3–1 away win over Giana Erminio, one week later he scored again in a 2–1 away defeat against Cittadella.

=== Lucchese ===
On 1 September 2022, Ravasio signed a one-year contract with Lucchese.

=== Cittadella ===
On 9 August 2024, he joined Cittadella on permanent basis.

=== Arezzo ===
On 30 January 2025, Ravasio signed a two-and-a-half-year contract with Arezzo in Serie C.

=== Foggia ===
On 1 September 2026, he joined Foggia in Serie C.
