= Giugliano Calcio 1928 =

Italian football club

Giugliano
- Full name: Giugliano Calcio 1928 s.r.l.
- Nicknames: Tigrotti (Tiger cubs), Gialloblù (Yellow and blue)
- Founded: 1928; 98 years ago 2010 (re-founded); 2017 (re-founded); 2021 (re-founded)
- Ground: Stadio Alberto De Cristofaro, Giugliano in Campania, Italy
- Capacity: 6,200
- President: Alfonso Mazzamauro
- Manager: Lello Di Napoli
- League: Serie C Group C
- 2025–26: Serie C Group C, 17th of 20
- Website: https://www.giugliano1928.it/
Home colours	Away colours	Third colours

Giugliano Calcio 1928 is an Italian association football club based in Giugliano in Campania, in the region of Campania. The club was founded in 1928, and play in the Serie C Group C.

== History ==
The club was founded as Unione Sportiva Fascista Giuglianese in 1928. Giuglianese was admitted to Prima Categoria U.L.I.C. (Free Italian Footballers Union) for the 1928–29 season. In 1929, the team's name was changed to Aurelio Padovani Giugliano and were enrolled in the third regional division championship of the F.I.G.C. and included in Group B.

In 1997-1998, the team won the Scudetto and the Serie D Championship.

In 2022, Giugliano Calcio won Serie D/G, earning promotion to Serie C the following season.

== Colors and crest ==
Giugliano's colors are blue and yellow. Their circular crest features a prowling tiger and (the year 1928), the original foundation date of the club.

== Current squad ==
As of 1 September 2026

Note: Flags indicate national team as defined under FIFA eligibility rules; some limited exceptions apply. Players may hold more than one non-FIFA nationality.

No.	Pos.	Nation	Player
1	GK	ITA	Luca Bolletta
2	MF	ITA	Ciro Panico
3	DF	ITA	Matteo Marchisano (on loan from Avellino)
4	MF	ITA	Roberto Zammarini
5	DF	GBS	Pedro Justiniano
6	MF	ITA	Jérémie Broh
8	MF	ITA	Roberto De Rosa
9	FW	NGR	Chinaecherem Ibe
10	FW	ESP	Ibourahima Baldé
12	GK	ITA	Lorenzo Santarelli
15	DF	ITA	Luigi D'Avino (on loan from Napoli)
16	FW	ITA	Riccardo Improta
17	FW	ITA	Gennaro Esposito
19	MF	ITA	Antonio Cimmaruta
21	MF	ITA	Luigi Forciniti
24	DF	ITA	Marco Caldore
26	DF	ITA	Alessandro Minelli
30	MF	ARG	Marco Borgnino
31	MF	ITA	Luigi Giordano

No.	Pos.	Nation	Player
33	DF	ITA	Salvatore Dario La Vardera
44	MF	ITA	Luciano Peluso
47	FW	ITA	King Udoh
77	GK	ITA	Stefano Greco
79	DF	ITA	Giovanni Basile
86	FW	ITA	Vincenzo Ponte
90	FW	ITA	Roberto Ogunseye (on loan from Cesena)
99	FW	ITA	Salvatore Cuomo
—	GK	ITA	Matteo Antignani
—	GK	ITA	Manuel La Matta
—	DF	ITA	Francesco De Francesco
—	DF	ITA	Giuliano Laezza
—	DF	ALB	Ardit Nuredini
—	DF	ITA	Mattia Rigo
—	DF	ITA	Antonio Scaravilli
—	MF	ITA	Alessio Minei
—	MF	ITA	Mario Prezioso
—	FW	ITA	Giuseppe Borello
—	FW	ITA	Umberto Galletta (on loan from Casertana)

=== Out on loan ===
Note: Flags indicate national team as defined under FIFA eligibility rules; some limited exceptions apply. Players may hold more than one non-FIFA nationality.

No. / Pos. / Nation / Player; — / DF / ITA / Giovanni Vaglica (at Carpi until 30 June 2027)	No. / Pos. / Nation / Player; — / FW / ITA / Cristiano Dell'Orzo (at Nardò until 30 June 2027)

== Honours ==
- Serie D
  - Champions (2): 1997–1998, 2021-2022
- Scudetto D
  - Champions: 1997–1998

== Bibliography ==
- Buonanno, Paolo (2013). 85 anni di calcio a Giugliano, Una storia in gialloblu (in Italian). Giugliano in Campania: Abbiabbè.
- Buonanno, Paolo (2018). Il Sogno della C2 e dello Scudetto Dilettanti (in Italian). Giugliano in Campania: Abbiabbè.
