= SS Arezzo =

Italian football club

Arezzo
- Full name: Società Sportiva Arezzo
- Nicknames: Amaranto (Dark Reds); Cavallo Rampante (Rampant Horse)
- Founded: 1923; 103 years ago, as Juventus FBC; 1936; 90 years ago, as SS Juventus; 1993; 33 years ago, as AC Arezzo; 2010; 16 years ago, as ASDA Arezzo; 2018; 8 years ago, as SS Arezzo
- Stadium: Stadio Città di Arezzo
- Capacity: 13,128
- Owner: Gelmax S.r.l.
- President: Guglielmo Manzo
- Head coach: Cristian Bucchi
- League: Serie B
- 2025–26: Serie C Group B, 1st of 20 (promoted)
- Website: www.ssarezzo.it
Home colours	Away colours	Third colours

Società Sportiva Arezzo (formerly Associazione Sportiva Dilettantistica Atletico Arezzo and Associazione Calcio Arezzo) is an Italian association football club based in Arezzo, Tuscany. The club was formed in 1923, refounded in 1993 after going bankrupt and refounded in 2010 after being unable to enroll in the tournament. The club plays in Serie B, the second tier of Italian football in the 2026–27 season, following promotion from Serie C.

== History ==
Former AC Arezzo logo

The club was founded on 9 September 1923, by a group of friends, and football fans, as Juventus Football Club Arezzo (in honour of Juventus F.C.). In 1930, following a merge with several other minor Arezzo teams, the club became Unione Sportiva Arezzo, which was admitted in 1935 to new-born Serie C division. The team was relegated from Serie C in 1953, following several financial troubles, returning to Serie C division five years later. In 1961, Arezzo started to play its games in the Stadio Comunale, its current venue. In 1966, Arezzo promoted to Serie B for the first time; in order to celebrate the triumph, Arezzo played a friendly match with Brazilian team Vasco da Gama, winning it 2–1. However, the next year Arezzo was not able to remain in the division, and returned to Serie C the following year. But in 1969 Arezzo again won Serie C, and returned to play in Serie B, where it played until 1975. In 1971, Arezzo signed striker Francesco Graziani, who quickly became a fan favourite and a key player for the team.

The third promotion to Serie B came in 1982, under coach Antonio Valentin Angelillo, with Tullio Gritti as striker. The previous year, Arezzo had won its first (and only) Italy's Serie C Cup, defeating Ternana in the finals. In 1984, Arezzo barely missed promotion to Serie A, ending just five points back from the last promotion place. In 1988, despite a team accordingly built to promote to Serie A, Arezzo relegated to Serie C1. Arezzo disbanded in 1993, following financial troubles, being excluded by Serie C1 seven football days before the end of the season. Following the cancellation, a pool of shareholders led by former Arezzo star Ciccio Graziani founded Associazione Calcio Arezzo, admitted to Serie D. In 1996 an unknown coach with a few lower division experiences, Serse Cosmi, was appointed as new manager. Despite his complete lack of experience in the division, Cosmi immediately won hands down Serie D, leading Arezzo back to professional football. In 1998, again with Cosmi, Arezzo qualified to and won the Serie C2 promotion playoffs, gaining promotion to Serie C1. In 1999/2000, despite the contributions of Fabio Bazzani, Arezzo lost promotion playoffs; the following year, after Cosmi left Arezzo for Serie A side Perugia, Antonio Cabrini was appointed as new coach, and Mario Frick replaced Bazzani as forward. The team returned to Serie B in 2004, with Mario Somma as coach; the next season, which saw Pasquale Marino replacing Somma, who signed for Empoli, Arezzo barely maintained a Serie B place.

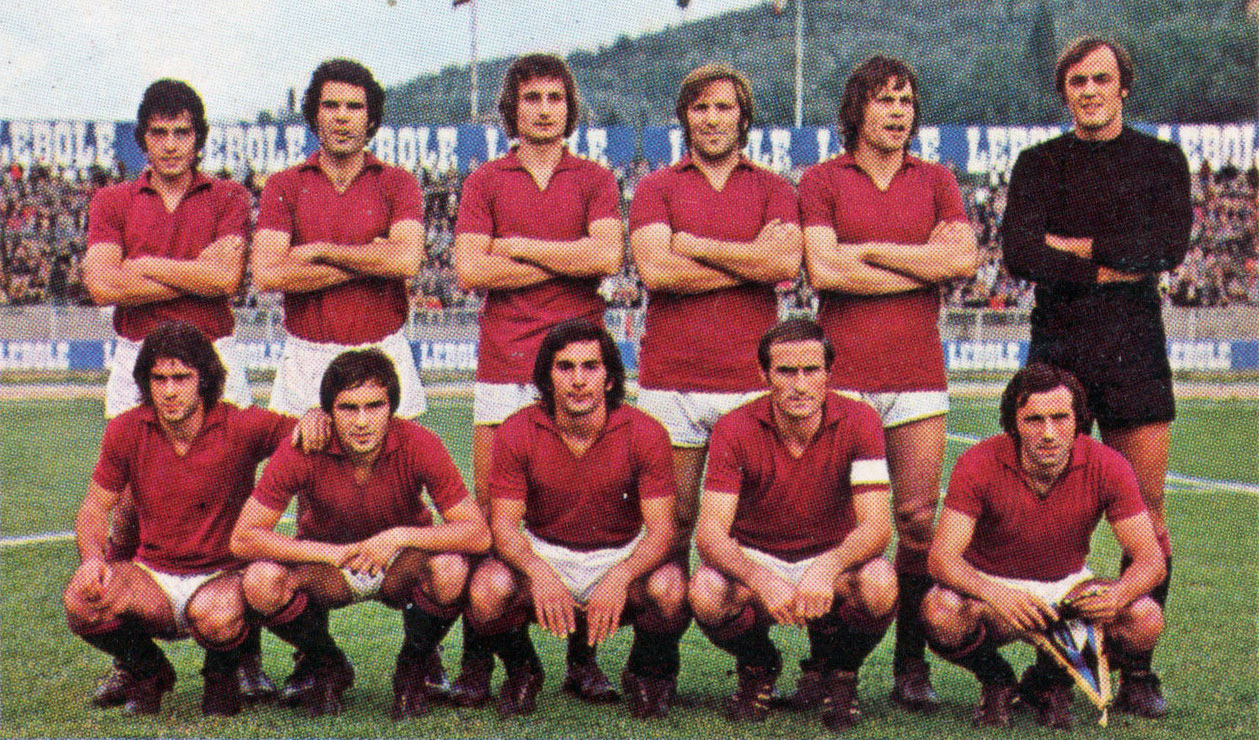
1973–74 Arezzo

At the end of the 2009–10 Lega Pro Prima Divisione season the club, due to financial problems, were unable to enroll to the next season tournament. A new club with the Associazione Sportiva Dilettantistica Atletico Arezzo denomination was entered in Serie D.

In November 2010 the club was acquired by a consortium of Rome-based entrepreneurs (including popular actor Luca Zingaretti) for a sum of €400,000; the new owners immediately made a number of changes, appointing former Cagliari player Maurizio Coppola as head coach and former Serie A star Abel Balbo as assistant coach and technical area coordinator.

On 1 July 2012 the club was renamed Unione Sportiva Arezzo with Balbo as new head coach, replaced since 30 October 2012 by Michele Bacis.

On 9 January 2013 Mauro Ferretti, an entrepreneur from Rome, bought the club. A few weeks later, on 28 January, Federico Nofri replaced Bacis as coach.

For the 2013–14 season, Davide Mezzanotti was appointed as new coach. After the club ended in third place, Ezio Capuano was named new head coach; later in September 2014, Arezzo was readmitted to Lega Pro to fill a vacancy. Under Capuano's tenure (which lasted until April 2016), the club safely escaped relegation on both seasons. For the 2016–17 season, the club came with a new head coach, Stefano Sottili, and a number of major signings such as former Serie A player Davide Moscardelli.

On 26 April 2026, Arezzo secure promotion to Serie B from next season after defeat Torres 3–1 and return to second tier after 19 years absence.

== Recent seasons ==
Season	Division	Tier	Pos	Pl	W	D	L	+	-	P	Cup	Note
2016–17	Lega Pro (Group A)	III	4	38	18	11	9	50	38	65	2nd round	Eliminated in the Promotion play-offs 1/16-finals to Lucchese
2017–18	Serie C (Group A)	III	16	36	14	10	12	39	35	39	1st round	
2018–19	Serie C (Group A)	III	4	37	16	16	5	49	32	64	–	Eliminated in the Promotion play-offs semifinals to Pisa
2019–20	Serie C (Group B)	III	9	27	8	13	6	33	28	37	2nd round	Did not participate in the Promotion play-offs despite qualifying
2020–21	Serie C (Group B)	III	↓ 20	38	5	14	19	37	66	29	2nd round	Relegated to Serie D
2021–22	Serie D (Group E)	IV	3	34	18	10	6	65	45	64	–	Eliminated in the Promotion play-offs semifinals to Follonica Gavorrano
2022–23	Serie D (Group E)	IV	↑ 1	34	21	7	6	54	30	70	–	Promoted to Serie C
2023–24	Serie C (Group B)	III	8	38	14	11	13	46	44	53	–	Eliminated in the Promotion play-offs 1/32-finals to Juventus Next Gen
2024–25	Serie C (Group B)	III	5	38	18	8	12	47	37	62	–	Eliminated in the Promotion play-offs 1/16-finals to Vis Pesaro
2025–26	Serie C (Group B)	III	↑ 1	36	24	8	4	64	24	80	–	Promoted to Serie B

== Scoring history ==
Highest scoring and best win:

- 2004–05 season: 5–3, defeated Verona

== Players ==
=== Current squad ===
As of 25 September 2026

Note: Flags indicate national team as defined under FIFA eligibility rules; some limited exceptions apply. Players may hold more than one non-FIFA nationality.

No.	Pos.	Nation	Player
1	GK	ITA	Luca Trombini
2	DF	DOM	Marlon Mena (on loan from Parma)
4	DF	ITA	Mauro Coppolaro
5	DF	ARG	Julián Illanes
6	MF	ITA	Alessandro Renzi
7	MF	ITA	Kevin Leone (on loan from Sassuolo)
8	MF	GHA	Shaka Mawuli
9	FW	ITA	Alberto Cerri
10	FW	ITA	Emiliano Pattarello
11	FW	ITA	Leonardo Mancuso
13	DF	ITA	Matteo Gilli
14	GK	ITA	Alessandro Nunziante (on loan from Udinese)
16	MF	ITA	Mattia Sala
17	MF	MDA	Artur Ioniță
19	DF	ITA	Marco Chiosa (captain)

No.	Pos.	Nation	Player
21	MF	ITA	Camillo Tavernelli
22	GK	ROU	Francesco Șerban
23	MF	ITA	Mattia Viviani
24	MF	ITA	Luca Chierico
26	DF	ITA	Filippo De Col
30	FW	ITA	Alessandro Arena
32	DF	ITA	Andrea Cagnano
33	DF	ITA	Davide Mancini
37	DF	ITA	Samuele Righetti
47	MF	ITA	Aleandro Manes
67	DF	ITA	Gian Marco Ferrari
71	FW	ITA	Pietro Cianci
78	MF	ITA	Gennaro Iaccarino
90	GK	ITA	Andrea Seculin
99	FW	ITA	Marco Olivieri (on loan from Cesena)

=== Out on loan ===
Note: Flags indicate national team as defined under FIFA eligibility rules; some limited exceptions apply. Players may hold more than one non-FIFA nationality.

No.	Pos.	Nation	Player
—	GK	ITA	Amoris Galli (at Atletico Lodigiani until 30 June 2027)
—	MF	ITA	Mattia Damiani (at Grosseto until 30 June 2027)
—	MF	ITA	Patrick Moreschini (at Atletico Lodigiani until 30 June 2027)
—	MF	GBS	Muhamed Varela Djamanca (at Salernitana until 30 June 2027)
—	FW	ITA	Alessandro Capello (at Lecco until 30 June 2027)

No.	Pos.	Nation	Player
—	FW	ITA	Gianmarco Cipriani (at Atletico Lodigiani until 30 June 2027)
—	FW	ITA	Matteo Cortesi (at Perugia until 30 June 2027)
—	FW	ITA	Mario Ravasio (at Foggia until 30 June 2027)
—	FW	ITA	Samuele Sussi (at Montevarchi until 30 June 2027)

== Notable managers ==
(Italy) Antonio Conte

(Italy) Maurizio Sarri

== Honours ==
- Serie C

Winners: 2025–26

- Coppa Italia Serie C

Winners: 1980–81

- Supercoppa di Serie C

Winners: 2004
