= SS Audace Cerignola =

Italian football club

Audace Cerignola
- Full name: Società Sportiva; Audace Cerignola srl
- Founded: 1912; 114 years ago
- Ground: Stadio Domenico Monterisi, Cerignola, Italy
- Capacity: 8,000
- Chairman: Nicola Grieco
- Manager: Raimondo Catalano
- League: Serie C Group C
- 2025–26: Serie C Group C, 9th of 20
Home colours	Away colours	Third colours

S.S. Audace Cerignola, commonly known as Audace Cerignola or simply Cerignola, is an Italian association football club from Cerignola, Apulia. They play in the Serie C Group C.

== History ==
The club was originally founded in 1912 as Gruppo Sportivo Cerignola. They played Serie C from 1935 to 1937, after which they exclusively took part at amateur leagues.

The club voluntarily stepped out in 2013 due to financial issues, and restarted from Prima Categoria only a year later. In 2017 they returned to play Serie D, a league they had not played since the year 2000.

In 2019, Audace Cerignola ended the season in an impressive second place, behind AZ Picerno; in the following playoffs, they made it to the final, where they defeated Taranto, thus ensuring a priority slot in the Serie C repechages.

However, due to a number stadium-related issues, the Italian Football Federation denied Serie C entry to the club. After winning a first appeal to the Italian National Olympic Committee Court, and FIGC declining Audace Cerignola's admission due to other stadium-related technicalities, on 5 August 2019 the CONI Court once again overturned the latter's decision, confirming Audace Cerignola's right to take part in the 2019–20 Serie C.

Audace Cerignola were finally promoted to Serie C in the 2021–22 Serie D season, as Group H champions, under the guidance of head coach Michele Pazienza.

== Current squad ==
As of 1 September 2026

Note: Flags indicate national team as defined under FIFA eligibility rules; some limited exceptions apply. Players may hold more than one non-FIFA nationality.

No.	Pos.	Nation	Player
1	GK	ITA	Andrea Vailati (on loan from Monza)
2	DF	ALB	Adi Kurti (on loan from Hellas Verona)
3	DF	ITA	Francesco Sena
4	MF	ITA	Gaetano Vitale
5	DF	ITA	Luca Martinelli
7	DF	ITA	Alessandro Vinciguerra
8	MF	ESP	Oscar Moreso
9	FW	ITA	Diego Gambale
10	FW	ITA	Ludovico D'Orazio
11	FW	ITA	Ernesto Ballabile
12	GK	ITA	Giuseppe Fares
13	DF	ITA	Gianmarco Barletta
14	FW	ITA	Cristian Padula (on loan from Torino)
17	MF	ITA	Francesco Amiranda (on loan from Avellino)
18	MF	ITA	Cristian Guaragna
19	MF	ITA	Antonio Iorio (on loan from Lazio)
20	FW	ITA	Michelangelo Nanula
22	GK	ITA	Antonino Viola
23	DF	ITA	Andrea Gasbarro

No.	Pos.	Nation	Player
24	MF	ITA	Alessandro Romano
27	MF	ITA	Antonio Boccadamo (on loan from Virtus Entella)
33	FW	ITA	Mario Perlingieri (on loan from Benevento)
37	DF	ITA	Alessandro Silvestro
45	MF	ITA	Alessandro Cilenti
55	DF	ITA	Martin Cocorocchio
58	MF	ITA	Carmine Cretella
77	FW	ITA	Manuel Pinotti (on loan from Inter Milan)
86	DF	ITA	Ruggero Labranca
99	DF	ITA	Claudio Parlato
—	GK	ITA	Alfonso Rizzuto
—	DF	ARG	Matías Casarosa
—	DF	ITA	Kevin Miranda (on loan from Sassuolo)
—	MF	ITA	Marco Meli
—	MF	FRA	Matiss Sellaf
—	MF	ITA	Giacomo Seminari
—	FW	ITA	Flavio Ventola
—	FW	ITA	Giovanni Volpe

=== Out on loan ===
Note: Flags indicate national team as defined under FIFA eligibility rules; some limited exceptions apply. Players may hold more than one non-FIFA nationality.

No. / Pos. / Nation / Player; — / DF / ITA / Santiago Benucci (at Tau Altopascio until 30 June 2027)	No. / Pos. / Nation / Player; — / FW / ITA / Nicolas Iurilli (at Melfi until 30 June 2027)
