= 2025–26 Latina Calcio 1932 season =

Italian football club season 2025-26

Latina Calcio 1932
2025–26 season
- Manager: Alessandro Bruno
- Stadium: Stadio Domenico Francioni
- Serie C Group C: 15th
- Coppa Italia Serie C: Second round
- Biggest defeat: Trapani 6–0 Latina

The 2025–26 season is the 94th in the history of Latina Calcio 1932 and the club's fifth consecutive season in Serie C of the Italian football league. In addition to the domestic league, Latina will also compete in the Coppa Italia Serie C.

== Squad ==
=== Transfers In ===
Pos.	Player	Transferred from	Fee	Date	Source
MF	(Italy) Orazio Pannitteri	(Italy) Lumezzane	Undisclosed	22 July 2025	
FW	(Venezuela) Daniele Quieto	(Italy) Inter U20	Loan	6 August 2025	
DF	(Romania) Eduard Duțu	(Italy) Fiorentina	Free	12 August 2025	
MF	(Italy) Nicola Fasan	(Italy) Caldiero Terme	Free	13 August 2025	
FW	(Italy) Luca Gagliano	(Italy) Audace Cerignola	Undisclosed	13 August 2025	
MF	(Italy) Alessandro Pellitteri	(Italy) Campobasso	Loan	19 August 2025	
FW	(Italy) Giacomo Parigi	(Italy) Rimini	€400,000	1 September 2025	
MF	(Romania) Denis Hergheligiu	(Italy) Union Brescia	Loan	1 September 2025	

=== Transfers Out ===
Pos.	Player	Transferred to	Fee	Date	Source
FW	(Serbia) Miloš Bočić	(Italy) Catania	Loan return	30 June 2025	
DF	(Argentina) Tamir Berman	(Italy) Monopoli	Loan return	30 June 2025	
DF	(Italy) Mattia Motolese	(Italy) Bologna	Loan return	30 June 2025	
FW	(Italy) Diego Zuppel	(Italy) Trapani	Loan return	30 June 2025	
DF	(Italy) Edoardo Vona	(Italy) Pontedera	Undisclosed	1 July 2025	
MF	(Albania) Emanuele Ndoj	(Italy) Ascoli	Free	15 July 2025	
DF	(Morocco) Anass Serbouti	(Italy) Pineto	Free	7 August 2025	
DF	(Italy) Luca Crecco	(Italy) Sorrento	Free	13 August 2025	
MF	(Brazil) Luan Capanni	(Italy) Siracusa	Free	25 August 2025	
MF	(Italy) Davide Petermann	(Italy) Foggia	Undisclosed	28 August 2025	
MF	(Italy) Riccardo Improta		Contract terminated	1 September 2025	

== Friendlies ==
30 July 2025	Latina	0–1	Benevento

4 August 2025	Latina	4–1	L'Aquila

9 August 2025	Latina	0–0	Guidonia Montecelio

== Competitions ==
=== Overall record ===
Competition	First match	Last match	Starting round	Record							
Competition	First match	Last match	Starting round	Pld	W	D	L	GF	GA	GD	Win %
Serie C	24 August 2025	26 April 2026	Matchday 1	5	1	1	3	3	10	−7	20.00
Coppa Italia Serie C	17 August 2025		First round	1	1	0	0	1	0	+1	100.00
Total				6	2	1	3	4	10	−6	33.33

Last updated: 20 September 2025
Source: Competitions

=== Serie C ===
Group C

==== Results summary ====
Overall								Home						Away					
Pld	W	D	L	GF	GA	GD	Pts	W	D	L	GF	GA	GD	W	D	L	GF	GA	GD
5	1	1	3	3	10	−7	4	1	0	2	2	3	−1	0	1	1	1	7	−6

Last updated: 20 September 2025.

==== Results by round ====
Round	1	2	3	4	5
Ground	H	A	H	A	H
Result	W	L	L	D	L
Position	5	9	14	15	

Updated to match(es) played on 20 September 2025. Source:
A = Away; H = Home; W = Win; D = Draw; L = Loss

==== Matches ====
24 August 2025 1	Latina	1–0	Atalanta U23	Latina
18:00 UTC+2	Riccardi 58'			Stadium: Stadio Domenico Francioni; Attendance: 2,204; Referee: Domenico Castellone

30 August 2025 2	Trapani	6–0	Latina	Erice
21:00 UTC+2	Fischnaller 8'; Canotto 13'; Celeghin 21'; Grandolfo 55'; Ciotti 80'; Salines 87'			Stadium: Stadio Polisportivo Provinciale; Attendance: 3,471; Referee: Francesco D'Eusanio

7 September 2025 3	Latina	1–2	Picerno	Latina
20:30 UTC+2	Parigi (penalty missed) 65', 69'		Abreu 34'; Santarcangelo 86'	Stadium: Stadio Domenico Francioni; Referee: Giuseppe Maria Manzo

12 September 2025 4	Foggia	1–1	Latina	Foggia
20:30 UTC+2	D'Amico 38'		Parigi 85'	Stadium: Stadio Pino Zaccheria; Attendance: 1,484; Referee: Gianmarco Vailati

20 September 2025 5	Latina	0–1	Monopoli	Latina
17:30 UTC+2				Stadium: Stadio Domenico Francioni; Referee: Michele Pasculli

=== Coppa Italia Serie C ===
17 August 2025 First round	Latina	1–0	Gubbio	Latina
18:00 UTC+2	Pannitteri 40'			Stadium: Stadio Domenico Francioni; Referee: Andrea Palmieri

30 October 2025 Second round	Latina	v	Perugia
20:30 UTC+2
