= 2025–26 Calcio Foggia 1920 season =

Italian football club season

Calcio Foggia 1920
2025–26 season
- Manager: Delio Rossi
- Stadium: Stadio Pino Zaccheria
- Serie C Group C: 16th
- Coppa Italia Serie C: Second round
- Biggest win: Foggia 2–1 Siracusa; Foggia 1–0 Sorrento
- Biggest defeat: Catania 6–0 Foggia

The 2025–26 season is the 106th in the history of Calcio Foggia 1920 and the club's sixth consecutive season in Serie C of the Italian mens' football league. In addition to the domestic league, Foggia competes in the Coppa Italia Serie C. The season began on 16 August 2025.

On 31 July 2025, the National Federal Court sanctioned Foggia with a three-point deduction for administrative irregularities; however, the penalty was overturned on 8 September after the club’s appeal was upheld.

== Squad ==
=== Transfers In ===
Pos.	Player	Transferred from	Fee	Date	Source
MF	(Italy) Gerardo Agnelli	(Italy) Pompei	Loan return	30 June 2025	
MF	(Germany) Till Winkelmann	(Italy) Lecce U20	Undisclosed	25 July 2025	
MF	(Italy) Vincenzo Garofalo	(Italy) Messina	Free	27 July 2025	
DF	(Italy) Riccardo Bignami	(Italy) Pergolettese	Free	31 July 2025	
GK	(Romania) Alexandru Borbei	(Italy) Lecce	Loan	8 August 2025	
FW	(Italy) Marco Bevilacqua	(Italy) Civitanovese	Free	11 August 2025	
DF	(Moldova) Cornelius Staver	(Italy) Pescara	Undisclosed	12 August 2025	
MF	(Italy) Gianmarco Castorri	(Italy) Cesena	Free	12 August 2025	
MF	(Italy) Giuseppe Pellegrino	(Italy) Lanciano FC	Free	14 August 2025	
DF	(Italy) Alessio Buttaro	(Italy) Palermo	Loan	21 August 2025	
GK	(Italy) Federico Magro	(Italy) Hellas Verona	Loan	21 August 2025	
MF	(Morocco) Naïm Byar	(Italy) Bologna U19	Loan	27 August 2025	
MF	(Italy) Gabriele Morelli	(Italy) Campobasso	Undisclosed	28 August 2025	
MF	(Italy) Davide Petermann	(Italy) Latina	Undisclosed	28 August 2025	
DF	(Italy) Alessandro Minelli	(Italy) Giugliano	Loan	28 August 2025	
DF	(Italy) Federico Valietti	(Italy) Trapani	Undisclosed	28 August 2025	
DF	(Italy) Francesco Rizzo	(Italy) Team Altamura	Undisclosed	29 August 2025	
MF	(Italy) Felice D'Amico	(Italy) Team Altamura	Undisclosed	29 August 2025	
FW	(Senegal) Youssouph Cheikh Sylla	(Italy) Monopoli	Undisclosed	1 September 2025	
DF	(Italy) Edoardo Olivieri	(Italy) Modena	Loan	1 September 2025	
MF	(Italy) Marco Oliva	(Italy) Modena	Undisclosed	1 September 2025	
FW	(Italy) Daniel Fossati	(Italy) Genoa	Loan	1 September 2025	
FW	(Croatia) Miroslav Iličić	Unattached		9 September 2025	

=== Transfers Out ===
Pos.	Player	Transferred to	Fee	Date	Source
MF	(Italy) Marco Zunno	(Italy) Cremonese	Loan return	30 June 2025	
MF	(France) Mathis Touho	(France) Amiens	Loan return	30 June 2025	
MF	(Morocco) Sofian Kiyine	(Italy) Triestina	Loan return	30 June 2025	
DF	(Romania) Eduard Duțu	(Italy) Fiorentina	Loan return	30 June 2025	
FW	(Italy) Giuseppe Brugognone	(Italy) Empoli	Loan return	30 June 2025	
FW	(Senegal) Amadou Sarr	(Italy) Inter U23	Loan return	30 June 2025	
MF	(Italy) Davide Mazzocco	(Italy) Dolomiti Bellunesi	Free	17 July 2025	
MF	(Italy) Michele Emmausso	(Italy) Audace Cerignola	Undisclosed	22 July 2025	
GK	(Italy) Victor De Lucia	(Italy) Casertana	Free	14 August 2025	
FW	(Italy) Emanuele Santaniello	(Italy) Picerno	Free	20 August 2025	
FW	(Italy) Francesco Orlando	(Italy) Cavese	Undisclosed	28 August 2025	
MF	(Italy) Simone Tascone	(Italy) Guidonia Montecelio	€40,000	1 September 2025	
DF	(Italy) Alessandro Silvestro	(Italy) Triestina	Free	1 September 2025	

== Competitions ==
=== Overall record ===
Competition	First match	Last match	Starting round	Record							
Competition	First match	Last match	Starting round	Pld	W	D	L	GF	GA	GD	Win %
Serie C	24 August 2025	26 April 2026	Matchday 1	5	1	2	2	2	8	−6	20.00
Coppa Italia Serie C	16 August 2025		First round	1	1	0	0	2	1	+1	100.00
Total				6	2	2	2	4	9	−5	33.33

Last updated: 20 September 2025
Source: Competitions

=== Serie C ===
Group C

==== Results summary ====
Overall								Home						Away					
Pld	W	D	L	GF	GA	GD	Pts	W	D	L	GF	GA	GD	W	D	L	GF	GA	GD
5	1	2	2	2	8	−6	5	1	1	0	2	1	+1	0	1	2	0	7	−7

Last updated: 20 September 2025.

==== Results by round ====
Round	1	2	3	4	5
Ground	A	H	A	H	A
Result	L	W	L	D	D
Position	19	9	15	16	

Updated to match(es) played on 20 September 2025. Source:
A = Away; H = Home; W = Win; D = Draw; L = Loss

==== Matches ====
The competition draw was held on 28 July 2025.

24 August 2025 1	Catania	6–0	Foggia	Catania
21:00 UTC+2	Cicerelli 7' (pen.); Donnarumma 21'; Ierardi 32'; Forte 39' (pen.); D'Ausilio 71'; Lunetta 80'			Stadium: Stadio Angelo Massimino; Attendance: 17,800; Referee: Domenico Mirabella

30 August 2025 2	Foggia	1–0	Sorrento	Foggia
21:00 UTC+2	Morelli 68'			Stadium: Stadio Pino Zaccheria; Attendance: 1,402; Referee: Cristiano Ursini

6 September 2025 3	Giugliano	1–0	Foggia	Giugliano in Campania
17:30 UTC+2	Borello 80' (pen.)			Stadium: Stadio Alberto De Cristofaro; Referee: Fabrizio Ramondino

12 September 2025 4	Foggia	1–1	Latina	Foggia
20:30 UTC+2	D'Amico 38'		Parigi 85'	Stadium: Stadio Pino Zaccheria; Attendance: 1,484; Referee: Gianmarco Vailati

20 September 2025 5	Audace Cerignola	0–0	Foggia	Cerignola
17:30 UTC+2				Stadium: Stadio Domenico Monterisi; Referee: Maksym Frasynyak

=== Coppa Italia Serie C ===
16 August 2025 First round	Foggia	2–1	Siracusa	Foggia
21:00 UTC+2	Garofalo 21' (pen.); Bevilacqua 57'		Contini 67'	Stadium: Stadio Pino Zaccheria; Attendance: 2,605; Referee: Antonio Liotta

28 October 2025 Second round	Crotone	v	Foggia
20:30 UTC+2
