= 2025–26 Benevento Calcio season =

Italian football club season 2025-26

Benevento Calcio
2025-26 season
- Manager: Gaetano Auteri
- Stadium: Stadio Ciro Vigorito
- Serie C Group C: 3rd
- Coppa Italia Serie C: Second round
- Top goalscorer: League: Francesco Salvemini (3); All: Francesco Salvemini (3)
- Biggest win: 1–0 Guidonia Montecelio

The 2025–26 season is the 97th in the history of Benevento Calcio and the club's third consecutive season in Serie C of Italian mens' football. In addition to the domestic league, Benevento competes in the Coppa Italia Serie C. The season began on 16 August 2025.

== Squad ==
=== Transfers In ===
Pos.	Player	Transferred from	Fee	Date	Source
DF	(Italy) Diego Borghini	(Italy) AlbinoLeffe	Free	18 July 2025	
DF	(Italy) Andrea Ceresoli	(Italy) Atalanta U23	Loan	20 July 2025	
DF	(Italy) Riccardo Iacoponi	(Italy) Trastevere	Free	24 July 2025	
MF	(Italy) Dino Mehić	(Italy) Virtus Verona	Undisclosed	25 July 2025	
GK	(Italy) Danilo Russo	(Italy) Giugliano	Free	5 August 2025	
FW	(Italy) Marco Tumminello	(Italy) Crotone	Undisclosed	1 September 2025	
FW	(Italy) Raffaele Cantisani	(Italy) Crotone	Undisclosed	1 September 2025	

=== Transfers Out ===
Pos.	Player	Transferred to	Fee	Date	Source
DF	(Morocco) Shady Oukhadda	(Italy) Modena	Loan return	30 June 2025	
MF	(Italy) Vincenzo Bisogno	(Italy) Igea Virtus	Free	22 July 2025	
FW	(Italy) Samuele Sorrentino	(Italy) Cassino	Free	24 July 2025	
GK	(Italy) Alessandro Nunziante	(Italy) Udinese	Undisclosed	29 July 2025	
DF	(Romania) Alin Toșca	(Romania) FC Universitatea Cluj	Free	1 August 2025	
DF	(Italy) Riccardo Iacoponi	(Italy) Prato	Loan	14 August 2025	
MF	(Italy) Giuseppe Borello	(Italy) Giugliano	Undisclosed	14 August 2025	
DF	(Italy) Vincenzo Avolio	(Italy) Termoli	Loan	20 August 2025	
DF	(Italy) Antonio Ferrara	(Italy) Cosenza	Loan	21 August 2025	
FW	(Italy) Eric Lanini	(Italy) Novara	Undisclosed	21 August 2025	
MF	(Italy) Ernesto Starita	(Italy) Torres	Loan	28 August 2025	
DF	(Italy) Biagio Meccariello	(Italy) Ternana	Undisclosed	1 September 2025	
FW	(Italy) Mario Perlingieri	(Italy) Crotone	Loan	1 September 2025	
DF	(Italy) Filippo Berra	(Italy) Crotone	Undisclosed	1 September 2025	

== Friendlies ==
30 July 2025	Latina	0–1	Benevento

8 August 2025	Frosinone	0–1	Benevento

== Competitions ==
=== Overall record ===
Competition	First match	Last match	Starting round	Final position	Record							
Competition	First match	Last match	Starting round	Final position	Pld	W	D	L	GF	GA	GD	Win %
Serie C	25 August 2025	26 April 2026	Matchday 1	Winners	38	25	7	6	74	28	+46	65.79
Coppa Italia Serie C	16 August 2025		First round	Second round	2	1	0	1	1	2	−1	50.00
Total					40	26	7	7	75	30	+45	65.00

Last updated: 26 April 2026
Source: Competitions

=== Serie C ===
Group C

==== Results summary ====
Overall								Home						Away					
Pld	W	D	L	GF	GA	GD	Pts	W	D	L	GF	GA	GD	W	D	L	GF	GA	GD
38	25	7	6	74	28	+46	82	14	4	1	41	13	+28	11	3	5	33	15	+18

Last updated: 26 April 2026.
Source: soccerway

==== Results by round ====
Round	1	2	3	4	5	6	7	8	9	10	11	12	13	14	15
Ground	A	H	A	A	H	A	H	A	H	H	A	H	A	H	A
Result	W	W	L	W	W	D	W	L	W	W					
Position	4	2	4	3	2	2	1	2	2	1					

Updated to match(es) played on 19 October 2025. Source:
A = Away; H = Home; W = Win; D = Draw; L = Loss

==== Matches ====
25 August 2025 1	Crotone	1–2	Benevento	Crotone
21:00 UTC+2	Gómez 62'		Salvemini 10'; Lamesta 13'	Stadium: Stadio Ezio Scida; Attendance: 5,470; Referee: Gianluca Renzi

31 August 2025 2	Benevento	2–1	Casertana	Benevento
21:00 UTC+2	Salvemini 37'; Pierozzi 62'		Leone 25'	Stadium: Stadio Ciro Vigorito; Attendance: 6,262; Referee: Mattia Ubaldi

6 September 2025 3	Casarano	1–0	Benevento	Casarano
20:30 UTC+2	Pierozzi 80' (o.g.)			Stadium: Stadio Giuseppe Capozza; Referee: Mattia Nigro

13 September 2025 4	Siracusa	0–3	Benevento	Syracuse
17:30 UTC+2			Salvemini 46'; Manconi 68', 73'	Stadium: Stadio Nicola De Simone; Attendance: 3,607; Referee: Leonardo Mastrodomenico

21 September 2025 5	Benevento	2–0	Atalanta U23	Benevento
17:00 UTC+2	Manconi 20'; Salvemini 54'			Stadium: Stadio Ciro Vigorito; Referee: Bruno Spina

24 September 2025 6	Picerno	2–2	Benevento	Picerno
20:45 CET	Maselli (yellow card) 35'; Granata (yellow card) 53' (goal) 61'; Antonio Energe 68'; Andrea Marino (yellow card) 90'	Report	Francesco Salvemini 3' 54' (pen.) (yellow card) 55'; Andrea Ceresoli (yellow card) 43'; Dino Mehić (yellow card) 81'	Stadium: Donato Curcio; Attendance: 620; Referee: (Italy) Giorgio Di Cicco

28 September 2025 7	Benevento	2–0	Trapani	Benevento
15:00 CET	Manconi 10'; Pierozzi 40'; Borghini (yellow card) 50'; Vannucchi (yellow card) 82'	Report	Negro (yellow card) 84'	Stadium: Stadio Ciro Vigorito; Attendance: 5,234; Referee: (Italy) Luca De Angeli

3 October 2025 8	Latina	1–0	Benevento	Latina
20:30 CET	Ekuban 64'; Emanuel Ercolano (yellow card) 68'; Parigi (yellow card) 79'	Report	Ricci (yellow card) 22'	Stadium: Stadio Domenico Francioni; Attendance: 2,283; Referee: (Italy) Mattia Drigo

12 October 2025 9	Benevento	4–0	Team Altamura	Benevento
17:30 CET	Francesco Salvemini 22' (pen.); Lamesta 45+2'; Manconi 50'; Guglielmo Mignani 87'	Report		Stadium: Stadio Ciro Vigorito; Attendance: 6,157; Referee: (Italy) Felipe Viapiana

19 October 2025 10	Benevento	2–0	Potenza	Benevento
14:30 CET	Francesco Salvemini 7'; Vannucchi (yellow card) 27'; Manconi (yellow card) 55'; Pierozzi 72'; Antonio Prisco (yellow card) 82'	Report		Stadium: Stadio Ciro Vigorito; Attendance: 6,235; Referee: (Italy) Francesco Zago

=== Coppa Italia Serie C ===
16 August 2025 First round	Benevento	1–0	Guidonia Montecelio	Benevento
21:00 UTC+2	Lamesta 89'			Stadium: Stadio Ciro Vigorito; Referee: Riccardo Tropiano

29 October 2025 Second round	Giugliano	v	Benevento
20:30 UTC+2
