= 2025–26 Rimini FC 1912 season =

Italian football club season 2025-26

Rimini FC 1912
- Manager: Piero Braglia (until 5 September); Filippo D'Alesio (since 5 September)
- Stadium: Stadio Romeo Neri
- Serie C: 20th
- Coppa Italia: Preliminary round
- Coppa Italia Serie C: Second round

The 2025–26 season is the 114th in the history of Rimini Football Club and the club's fourth consecutive season in Serie C. In addition to the domestic league, Rimini competes in the Coppa Italia and the Coppa Italia Serie C. The season began on 10 August 2025.

On 6 August, the veteran coach Piero Braglia was appointed. On 5 September, he announced his resignation. On 2 September, the National Federal Court imposed a €5,000 fine on Rimini and deducted 11 points from the club as a result of multiple administrative violations, including delays in salary payments.

== Squad ==
=== Transfers In ===
Pos.	Player	Transferred from	Fee	Date	Source
MF	(Italy) Andrea Gemello	(Italy) Parma U20	Loan	1 September 2025	
FW	(Venezuela) Lorenzo D'Agostini	(Italy) Lazio U20	Free	1 September 2025	
MF	(Denmark) Ank Asmussen	(Italy) Empoli	Loan	1 September 2025	
MF	(Italy) Marco Ballarini	(Italy) Udinese	Loan	1 September 2025	
DF	(Belgium) Jeremy Moray	(Italy) Empoli	Loan	1 September 2025	
MF	(Romania) Alexandru Capac	(Italy) Atalanta U23	Loan	1 September 2025	
FW	(Italy) Daniele Feliziani	(Italy) Monterosi U19	Free	6 September 2025	
DF	(France) Jordan Boli	Unattached		12 September 2025	
MF	(Italy) Gabriele Ferrarini	Unattached		16 September 2025	

=== Transfers Out ===
Pos.	Player	Transferred to	Fee	Date	Source
MF	(Italy) Antonio Cioffi	(Italy) Napoli	Loan return	30 June 2025	
FW	(Italy) Simone Leonardi	(Italy) Sampdoria	Loan return	30 June 2025	
GK	(Italy) Luca Ferretti	(Italy) Cesena		1 July 2025	
GK	(Italy) Simone Colombi	(Italy) Virtus Entella	Undisclosed	7 July 2025	
MF	(Italy) Alessandro Lombardi	(Italy) AlbinoLeffe		16 July 2025	
FW	(Italy) Diego Accursi	(Italy) Fossombrone		28 July 2025	
DF	(Italy) Matteo Gorelli	(Italy) Pianese	Contract terminated	20 August 2025	
FW	(The Gambia) Sulayman Jallow	(Italy) Fiorentina U20	€150,000	28 August 2025	
FW	(Italy) Giacomo Parigi	(Italy) Latina	€400,000	1 September 2025	
MF	(Italy) Christian Langella	(Italy) Cosenza	Free	1 September 2025	
MF	(Italy) Marco Garetto	(Italy) Ternana	Free	1 September 2025	
FW	(Italy) Leonardo Ubaldi	(Italy) Cavese	Free	1 September 2025	
DF	(Italy) Luca Falbo	(Italy) Ravenna		2 September 2025	
DF	(Lithuania) Linas Mėgelaitis	(Italy) Perugia	Contract terminated	2 September 2025	

== Competitions ==
=== Overall record ===
Competition	First match	Last match	Starting round	Final position	Record							
Competition	First match	Last match	Starting round	Final position	Pld	W	D	L	GF	GA	GD	Win %
Serie C	23 August 2025	26 April 2026	Matchday 1		5	1	1	3	3	7	−4	20.00
Coppa Italia	10 August 2025		Preliminary round	Preliminary round	1	0	0	1	0	1	−1	0.00
Coppa Italia Serie C	28–30 October 2025		Second round		0	0	0	0	0	0	+0	—
Total					6	1	1	4	3	8	−5	16.67

Last updated: 19 September 2025
Source: Competitions

=== Serie C ===
Group B

==== Results summary ====
Overall								Home						Away					
Pld	W	D	L	GF	GA	GD	Pts	W	D	L	GF	GA	GD	W	D	L	GF	GA	GD
5	1	1	3	3	7	−4	-7	1	0	2	2	5	−3	0	1	1	1	2	−1

Last updated: 19 September 2025.

==== Results by round ====
Round	1	2	3	4	5	6
Ground	H	A	H	A	H	A
Result	L	D	L	L	W	
Position	20	20	20	20	20	

Updated to match(es) played on 19 September 2025. Source:
A = Away; H = Home; W = Win; D = Draw; L = Loss

==== Matches ====
The competition draw was held on 28 July 2025.

23 August 2025 1	Rimini	0–1	Gubbio	Rimini
21:00 UTC+2			Tommasini 52'	Stadium: Stadio Romeo Neri; Attendance: 991; Referee: Riccardo Dasso

29 August 2025 2	Vis Pesaro	0–0	Rimini	Pesaro
21:00 UTC+2				Stadium: Stadio Tonino Benelli; Attendance: 2,384; Referee: Andrea Terribile

7 September 2025 3	Rimini	1–4	Ternana	Rimini
20:30 UTC+2	Lepri 30'		Balcot 5'; Ferrante 45+2'; Dubickas 45+6'; Orellana 58' (pen.)	Stadium: Stadio Romeo Neri; Attendance: 457; Referee: Felipe Salvatore Viapiana

13 September 2025 4	Pontedera	2–1	Rimini	Pontedera
17:30 UTC+2	Ladinetti 71' (pen.); Vitali 89'		Bellodi 90+4'	Stadium: Stadio Ettore Mannucci; Attendance: 486; Referee: Davide Galiffi

19 September 2025 5	Rimini	1–0	Forlì	Rimini
20:30 UTC+2	Longobardi 27'			Stadium: Stadio Romeo Neri; Referee: Riccardo Tropiano

23 September 2025 6	Guidonia Montecelio	v	Rimini	Latina
18:30 UTC+2				Stadium: Stadio Domenico Francioni

=== Coppa Italia ===
10 August 2025 Preliminary round	Pescara	1–0	Rimini	Pescara
20:30 UTC+2	Valzania 44'			Stadium: Stadio Adriatico – Giovanni Cornacchia; Referee: Lucio Felice Angelillo

=== Coppa Italia Serie C ===
28–30 October 2025 Second round	Rimini	v	Ravenna
