= 2023–24 Serie C =

Serie C
- Season: 2023–24
- Dates: Regular season: 3 September 2023 – 28 April 2024; Play-offs: 7 May 2024 – 9 June 2024
- Promoted: Mantova; Cesena; Juve Stabia; Carrarese (via play-off)
- Relegated: Fiorenzuola; Recanatese; Monterosi; Virtus Francavilla; Pro Sesto; Alessandria; Fermana; Olbia; Brindisi
- Matches: 1,140
- Goals: 2,657 (2.33 per match)
- Top goalscorer: Cosimo Patierno (20+1 goals)
- Biggest home win: Entella 5–0 Perugia; Rimini 5–0 Olbia; Avellino 6–1 Picerno
- Biggest away win: Padova 0–5 Mantova; Pontedera 0–5 Pescara; Latina 0–5 Avellino
- Highest scoring: Recanatese 4–5 Pontedera
- Longest winning run: 8 matches Cesena (22–29)
- Longest unbeaten run: 28 matches Cesena (2–29)
- Longest winless run: 16 matches Brindisi (18–33)
- Longest losing run: 7 matches Brindisi (11, 2, 12–16)
- Highest attendance: 19,739; Catania 0–1 Atalanta U23
- Lowest attendance: 26; Juventus Next Gen 2–0 Recanatese; Juventus Next Gen 1–1 Lucchese
- Total attendance: 3,073,976
- Average attendance: 2,685

The 2023–24 Serie C, officially known as Serie C NOW for sponsorship, was the 65th season of the Serie C, the third tier of the Italian football league system, organized by the Lega Pro.

Mantova, Cesena and Juve Stabia won their respective groups and were promoted directly to Serie B. Carrarese secured the fourth promotion place by defeating Vicenza 1–0 on aggregate in the play-off final, returning to Serie B after a 76-year absence.

== Changes ==
The league comprised 60 teams, geographically divided into three different groups. The Serie C league committee decided and formalized the group composition between July and August 2023.

The following teams have changed divisions since the 2022–23 season:

=== To Serie C ===
Relegated from Serie B

- Benevento
- Perugia
- SPAL

Promoted from Serie D

- Sestri Levante (Group A winners)
- Lumezzane (Group B winners)
- Legnago (Group C winners)
- Giana Erminio (Group D winners)
- Arezzo (Group E winners)
- Pineto (Group F winners)
- Sorrento (Group G winners)
- Brindisi (Group H winners)
- Catania (Group I winners)
- Casertana (Repechage)

=== From Serie C ===
Promoted to Serie B

- Feralpisalò
- Reggiana
- Catanzaro
- Lecco

Relegated to Serie D

- Sangiuliano City
- Piacenza
- San Donato Tavarnelle
- Imolese
- Montevarchi
- Gelbison
- Viterbese
- Fidelis Andria
- Pordenone (expelled)

=== Exclusions and readmissions ===
In early June 2023, the Italian Football Federation announced the rules to determine readmissions in the Serie C league.

Vacancies arising from clubs going bankrupt or not applying for a Serie C licence were filled by the league considering applications from teams relegated from Serie C, reserve teams of Serie A clubs, and Serie D playoff winners, in this order.

On 16 June 2023, Pordenone announced their intention to renounce their Serie C spot due to financial issues. On 24 July, the Federation replaced Pordenone with Mantova.

Siena and Reggina were excluded from their leagues. The FIGC admitted Atalanta Under-23 to replace Siena. The newly established Atalanta Under-23 side became the first reserve team of a Serie A club to follow Juventus Next Gen into Serie C. Brescia was readmitted to Serie B in place of Reggina. The remaining vacancy in Serie C was filled by Casertana.

== Group A (North) ==
=== Stadia and locations ===
9 teams from Lombardy, 5 teams from Veneto, 3 teams from Piedmont, 1 team from Emilia-Romagna, 1 team from Friuli-Venezia Giulia and 1 team from Trentino-Alto Adige/Südtirol.

Location of teams in 2023–24 Serie C (Group A)
Location of teams in 2023–24 Serie C (Group A) (Lombardy)

Club	City	Stadium	Capacity
AlbinoLeffe	Albino and Leffe	AlbinoLeffe Stadium (Zanica)	1,791
Alessandria	Alessandria	Giuseppe Moccagatta	5,926
Arzignano Valchiampo	Arzignano	Dal Molin	1,690
Atalanta U23	Bergamo	Comunale di Caravaggio (Caravaggio)	2,180
Fiorenzuola	Fiorenzuola d'Arda	Comunale di Fiorenzuola d'Arda	4,000
Giana Erminio	Gorgonzola	Città di Gorgonzola	3,766
Legnago	Legnago	Mario Sandrini	2,152
Lumezzane	Lumezzane	Tullio Saleri	4,150
Mantova	Mantua	Danilo Martelli	6,066
Novara	Novara	Silvio Piola (Novara)	17,875
Padova	Padua	Euganeo	32,420
Pergolettese	Crema	Giuseppe Voltini	4,095
Pro Patria	Busto Arsizio	Carlo Speroni	5,000
Pro Sesto	Sesto San Giovanni	Breda	3,523
Pro Vercelli	Vercelli	Silvio Piola (Vercelli)	5,526
Renate	Renate	Città di Meda (Meda)	2,500
Trento	Trento	Briamasco	3,000
Triestina	Trieste	Nereo Rocco	26,566
Vicenza	Vicenza	Romeo Menti	17,163
Virtus Verona	Verona	Mario Gavagnin-Sinibaldo Nocini	1,500

=== Table ===
Pos	Team	Pld	W	D	L	GF	GA	GD	Pts	Qualification
1	Mantova (P)	38	24	8	6	72	31	+41	80	Promotion to Serie B and Supercoppa di Serie C
2	Padova	38	21	14	3	55	28	+27	77	National play-offs 2nd round
3	Vicenza	38	20	11	7	52	30	+22	71	National play-offs 1st round
4	Triestina	38	19	7	12	61	44	+17	64	Group play-offs 2nd round
5	Atalanta U23	38	16	11	11	43	36	+7	59	Group play-offs 1st round
6	Legnago	38	13	17	8	46	39	+7	56	Group play-offs 1st round
7	Giana Erminio	38	15	8	15	46	44	+2	53 (Note: Giana Erminio and Pro Vercelli are ahead of Lumezzane on head-to-head points: Giana Erminio 9, Pro Vercelli 9, Lumezzane 0. Giana Erminio are ahead of Pro Vercelli on head-to-head goal difference: Giana Erminio +2, Pro Vercelli -2.)	Group play-offs 1st round
8	Pro Vercelli	38	14	11	13	50	47	+3	53	Group play-offs 1st round
9	Lumezzane	38	15	8	15	49	48	+1	53	Group play-offs 1st round
10	Trento	38	13	12	13	34	37	−3	51	Group play-offs 1st round
11	Virtus Verona	38	12	11	15	35	43	−8	47	
12	Pro Patria	38	12	10	16	37	51	−14	46	
13	AlbinoLeffe	38	10	15	13	34	37	−3	45 (Note: Albinoleffe are ahead of Renate on head-to-head points: Albinoleffe 8, Pergolettese 5, Renate 2.)	
14	Pergolettese	38	13	6	19	44	50	−6	45	
15	Renate	38	11	12	15	35	46	−11	45	
16	Arzignano	38	10	14	14	32	37	−5	44	
17	Novara (O)	38	8	19	11	39	49	−10	43	Relegation play-outs
18	Fiorenzuola (R)	38	10	8	20	38	62	−24	38	Relegation play-outs
19	Pro Sesto (Note: Automatically relegated for having more than eight points of distance from 16th-placed team Arzignano.) (R)	38	7	14	17	25	40	−15	35	Relegation to Serie D
20	Alessandria (Note: 3 points deducted due to irregularities in the June 2023 salary payments and due to further administrative irregularities) (R)	38	5	8	25	20	48	−28	20	Relegation to Serie D

Updated to match(es) played on 28 April 2024. Source: Lega Pro, Soccerway (in English)
Rules for classification: 1) Points; 2) Head-to-head points; 3) Head-to-head goal difference; 4) Goal difference; 5) Goals scored; 6) Lower goals against; 7) Wins; 8) Lower losses; 9) Away wins; 10) Lower home losses.
(Note: Head-to-head record is used only after all the matches between the teams in question have been played)
(O) Play-off winners; (P) Promoted; (R) Relegated

== Group B (Centre) ==
=== Stadia and locations ===
4 teams from Marche, 4 teams from Tuscany, 3 teams from Emilia-Romagna, 2 teams from Abruzzo, 2 teams from Liguria, 2 teams from Sardinia, 2 teams from Umbria and 1 team from Piedmont.

Location of teams in 2023–24 Serie C (Group B)

Club	City	Stadium	Capacity
Ancona	Ancona	Del Conero	23,976
Arezzo	Arezzo	Città di Arezzo	13,128
Carrarese	Carrara	Stadio dei Marmi	9,500
Cesena	Cesena	Orogel Stadium-Dino Manuzzi	20,194
Fermana	Fermo	Bruno Recchioni	8,920
Gubbio	Gubbio	Pietro Barbetti	4,939
Juventus Next Gen	Turin	Giuseppe Moccagatta (Alessandria)	5,926
Lucchese	Lucca	Porta Elisa	12,800
Olbia	Olbia	Bruno Nespoli	4,000
Perugia	Perugia	Renato Curi	23,625
Pescara	Pescara	Adriatico – Giovanni Cornacchia	20,515
Pineto	Pineto	Adriatico – Giovanni Cornacchia (Pescara)	20,515
Pontedera	Pontedera	Ettore Mannucci	2,700
Recanatese	Recanati	Nicola Tubaldi	1,500
Rimini	Rimini	Romeo Neri	9,768
Sestri Levante	Sestri Levante	Dei Marmi (Carrara)	9,500
SPAL	Ferrara	Paolo Mazza	16,134
Torres	Sassari	Vanni Sanna	7,480
Virtus Entella	Chiavari	Comunale di Chiavari	5,587
Vis Pesaro	Pesaro	Tonino Benelli	4,898

=== Table ===
Pos	Team	Pld	W	D	L	GF	GA	GD	Pts	Qualification
1	Cesena (C, P)	38	30	6	2	80	19	+61	96	Promotion to Serie B and Supercoppa di Serie C
2	Torres	38	22	9	7	56	38	+18	75	National play-offs 2nd round
3	Carrarese (O, P)	38	21	10	7	54	30	+24	73	National play-offs 1st round
4	Perugia	38	17	12	9	44	35	+9	63	Group play-offs 2nd round
5	Gubbio	38	16	11	11	50	38	+12	59	Group play-offs 1st round
6	Pescara	38	16	7	15	60	55	+5	55	Group play-offs 1st round
7	Juventus Next Gen	38	15	9	14	50	44	+6	54	Group play-offs 1st round
8	Arezzo	38	14	11	13	46	44	+2	53	Group play-offs 1st round
9	Pontedera	38	14	10	14	53	54	−1	52	Group play-offs 1st round
10	Rimini	38	14	8	16	52	54	−2	50	Group play-offs 1st round
11	SPAL	38	12	13	13	41	40	+1	49	
12	Lucchese	38	11	12	15	34	43	−9	45 (Note: Lucchese are ahead of Virtus Entella and Pineto on head-to-head points: Lucchese 7, Virtus Entella 3, Pineto 3. Virtus Entella are ahead of Pineto on overall goal difference: Virtus Entella -2, Pineto -4.)	
13	Virtus Entella	38	11	12	15	33	35	−2	45	
14	Pineto	38	9	18	11	38	42	−4	45	
15	Sestri Levante	38	12	8	18	42	55	−13	44	
16	Ancona (E, R)	38	10	12	16	41	51	−10	42	Phoenix in Serie D
17	Vis Pesaro	38	8	15	15	39	47	−8	39	Relegation play-outs
18	Recanatese (R)	38	10	8	20	47	65	−18	38	Relegation play-outs
19	Fermana (Note: Automatically relegated for having more than eight points of distance from 16th-placed team Ancona.) (R)	38	6	13	19	30	59	−29	31	Relegation to Serie D
20	Olbia (R)	38	6	8	24	25	67	−42	26	Relegation to Serie D

Updated to match(es) played on 28 April 2024. Source: Lega Pro, Soccerway (in English)
Rules for classification: 1) Points; 2) Head-to-head points; 3) Head-to-head goal difference; 4) Goal difference; 5) Goals scored; 6) Lower goals against; 7) Wins; 8) Lower losses; 9) Away wins; 10) Lower home losses.
(Note: Head-to-head record is used only after all the matches between the teams in question have been played)
(C) Champions; (E) Eliminated; (O) Play-off winners; (P) Promoted; (R) Relegated

== Group C (South) ==
=== Stadia and locations ===
7 teams from Campania, 6 teams from Apulia, 2 teams from Basilicata, 2 teams from Lazio, 2 teams from Sicily and 1 team from Calabria.

Location of teams in 2023–24 Serie C (Group C)
Location of teams in 2023–24 Serie C (Group C) (Campania)
Location of teams in 2023–24 Serie C (Group C) (Basilicata)

Club	City	Stadium	Capacity
Audace Cerignola	Cerignola	Domenico Monterisi	7,453
Avellino	Avellino	Partenio-Adriano Lombardi	26,000
Benevento	Benevento	Ciro Vigorito	16,867
Brindisi	Brindisi	Franco Fanuzzi	7,462
Casertana	Caserta	Alberto Pinto	12,000
Catania	Catania	Angelo Massimino	20,204
Crotone	Crotone	Ezio Scida	16,640
Foggia	Foggia	Pino Zaccheria	25,085
Giugliano	Giugliano in Campania	Alberto De Cristofaro	6,044
Juve Stabia	Castellammare di Stabia	Romeo Menti	7,642
Latina	Latina	Domenico Francioni	9,310
Messina	Messina	San Filippo-Franco Scoglio	38,722
Monopoli	Monopoli	Vito Simone Veneziani	6,880
Monterosi Tuscia	Monterosi	Gaetano Bonolis (Teramo)	7,498
Picerno	Picerno	Donato Curcio	1,500
Potenza	Potenza	Alfredo Viviani	4,977
Sorrento	Sorrento	Italia	3,600
Taranto	Taranto	Erasmo Iacovone	27,584
Turris	Torre del Greco	Amerigo Liguori	3,566
Virtus Francavilla	Francavilla Fontana	Nuovarredo Arena	3,360

=== Table ===
Pos	Team	Pld	W	D	L	GF	GA	GD	Pts	Qualification
1	Juve Stabia (P)	38	22	13	3	57	24	+33	79	Promotion to Serie B and Supercoppa di Serie C
2	Avellino	38	20	9	9	62	29	+33	69	National play-offs 2nd round
3	Benevento	38	18	12	8	45	33	+12	66	National play-offs 1st round
4	Casertana	38	17	14	7	51	38	+13	65 (Note: Casertana are ahead of Taranto on head-to-head points: Casertana 6, Taranto 0.)	Group play-offs 2nd round
5	Taranto (Note: 4 points deducted due to administrative irregularities.)	38	20	9	9	46	31	+15	65	Group play-offs 1st round
6	Picerno	38	15	13	10	53	40	+13	58	Group play-offs 1st round
7	Audace Cerignola	38	12	17	9	54	46	+8	53 (Note: Audace Cerignola are ahead of Giugliano on head-to-head points: Audace Cerignola 6, Giugliano 0.)	Group play-offs 1st round
8	Giugliano	38	15	8	15	44	47	−3	53	Group play-offs 1st round
9	Crotone	38	13	13	12	54	47	+7	52	Group play-offs 1st round
10	Latina	38	14	9	15	44	51	−7	51	Group play-offs 1st round
11	Foggia	38	13	9	16	40	44	−4	48 (Note: Foggia are ahead of Sorrento on overall goal difference: Foggia -4, Sorrento -8.)	
12	Sorrento	38	13	9	16	39	47	−8	48	
13	Catania	38	12	9	17	39	38	+1	45 (Note: Catania are ahead of Messina on overall goal difference: Catania +1, Messina -8.)	National play-offs 1st round (Note: Catania qualify for the national play-offs first round by winning the Coppa Italia Serie C.)
14	Messina	38	11	12	15	41	49	−8	45	
15	Turris	38	11	11	16	46	57	−11	44	
16	Potenza (O)	38	10	13	15	38	47	−9	43	Relegation play-outs
17	Monopoli (O)	38	10	12	16	41	51	−10	42	Relegation play-outs
18	Virtus Francavilla (R)	38	8	11	19	30	50	−20	35 (Note: Virtus Francavilla are ahead of Monterosi on head-to-head goal difference: Virtus Francavilla +1, Monterosi -1.)	Relegation play-outs
19	Monterosi (R)	38	8	11	19	43	62	−19	35	Relegation play-outs
20	Brindisi (Note: 4 points deducted due to administrative irregularities.) (R)	38	7	8	23	28	64	−36	25	Relegation to Serie D

Updated to match(es) played on 27 April 2024. Source: Lega Pro, Soccerway (in English)
Rules for classification: 1) Points; 2) Head-to-head points; 3) Head-to-head goal difference; 4) Goal difference; 5) Goals scored; 6) Lower goals against; 7) Wins; 8) Lower losses; 9) Away wins; 10) Lower home losses.
(Note: Head-to-head record is used only after all the matches between the teams in question have been played)
(O) Play-off winners; (P) Promoted; (R) Relegated

== Promotion play-offs ==
Rules and dates were confirmed on March 14, 2024. Because of an appeal by Taranto against a 4-point deduction, without which the final positions in Group C would change, all play-off rounds were postponed, with the new dates announced on 29 April.

=== Group phase ===
==== First round ====
In each group, the 5th-placed team plays the 10th-placed team, the 6th-placed team plays the 9th-placed team and the 7th-placed team plays the 8th-placed team. In case of a draw, the highest-placed team qualifies.

Matches were played on May 7.

Team 1	Score	Team 2
Atalanta U23	3–1	Trento
Legnago	1–0	Lumezzane
Giana Erminio	3–0	Pro Vercelli
Gubbio	0–1	Rimini
Pescara	2–2	Pontedera
Juventus Next Gen	2–0	Arezzo
Taranto	0–0	Latina
Picerno	2–0	Crotone
Audace Cerignola	1–1	Giugliano

==== Second round ====
In each group, the 4th-placed team plays the worst-placed winner from the first round, and the best-placed winner from the first round plays the second-best winner. In case of a draw, the highest-placed team qualifies.

Matches were played on May 11.

Team 1	Score	Team 2
Triestina	1–1	Giana Erminio
Atalanta U23	1–1	Legnago
Perugia	0–0	Rimini
Pescara	1–3	Juventus Next Gen
Casertana	0–0	Audace Cerignola
Taranto	0–0	Picerno

=== National phase ===
==== First round ====
The three 3rd-placed teams, the winner of Coppa Italia Serie C and the best winner from the group phase are seeded. In case of an aggregate draw, the seeded team qualifies.

The first legs were played on May 14, and the second legs on May 18.

Team 1	Agg.	Team 2	1st leg	2nd leg
Taranto	0–1	Vicenza	0–1	0–0
Perugia	2–3	Carrarese	0–2	2–1
Triestina	2–3	Benevento	1–1	1–2
Atalanta U23	1–1	Catania	0–1	1–0
Juventus Next Gen	3–2	Casertana	0–1	3–1

==== Second round ====
The three 2nd-placed teams and the best winner from the previous round are seeded. In case of an aggregate draw, the seeded team qualifies.

The first legs were played on May 21, and the second legs on May 25. The game between Vicenza and Padova, originally scheduled for May 21, was postponed to May 22 due to bad weather.

Team 1	Agg.	Team 2	1st leg	2nd leg
Vicenza	3–0	Padova	2–0	1–0
Benevento	1–0	Torres	1–0	0–0
Catania	2–2	Avellino	1–0	1–2
Juventus Next Gen	3–3	Carrarese	1–1	2–2

=== Final four ===
Pairings and teams hosting the second leg are drawn randomly. If the match ends in an aggregate draw, extra time is played, followed by penalties if necessary.

==== Semi-finals ====
The first legs were played on May 28, and the second legs on June 2.

Team 1	Agg.	Team 2	1st leg	2nd leg
Avellino	1–2	Vicenza	0–0	1–2
Carrarese	3–2	Benevento	1–0	2–2

==== Final ====
The first leg was played on June 5, and the second leg on June 9.

Team 1	Agg.	Team 2	1st leg	2nd leg
Vicenza	0–1	Carrarese	0–0	0–1

== Relegation play-outs ==
Rules and dates were confirmed on March 14, 2024.

The losers of each tie are relegated to Serie D. In case of an aggregate draw, the best-placed team avoids relegation. If the two teams involved in a tie are separated by more than 8 points, the matches are not played and the worst-placed team is automatically relegated.

The first legs were played on May 12 and the second legs on May 19.

Team 1	Agg.	Team 2	1st leg	2nd leg
Fiorenzuola	2–5	Novara	1–3	1–2
Recanatese	4–4	Vis Pesaro	1–0	3–4
Monterosi	1–2	Potenza	0–1	1–1
Virtus Francavilla	2–2	Monopoli	1–1	1–1

== Top goalscorers ==
Rank	Player	Club	Goals
1	(Italy) Cosimo Patierno^{1}	Avellino	21
2	(Italy) Jacopo Murano	Picerno	20
2	(Albania) Cristian Shpendi	Cesena	20
4	(Italy) Claudio Morra	Rimini	19
5	(Italy) Simone Guerra^{2}	Juventus Next Gen	17
5	(Italy) Davide Merola	Pescara	17
7	(Italy) Alessio Curcio^{1}	Casertana	16
7	(Italy) Filippo D'Andrea^{1}	Audace Cerignola	16
7	(Senegal) Maguette Fall^{3}	Giana Erminio	16
7	(Argentina) Franco Ferrari^{3}	Vicenza	16
7	(Argentina) Facundo Lescano	Triestina	16

Note

^{1} Player scored 1 goal in the play-offs.
^{2} Player scored 2 goals in the play-offs.
^{3} Player scored 3 goals in the play-offs.

== Supercup ==
2024	Mantova	1–2	Cesena	Stadio Danilo Martelli, Mantua
2024	Juve Stabia	1–4	Mantova	Stadio Romeo Menti, Castellammare di Stabia
2024	Cesena	2–2	Juve Stabia	Stadio Dino Manuzzi, Cesena
2024	Cesena (group B) won with 4 points at the top of the group

== Broadcasting ==
For the 2023–24 and 2024–25 seasons, Sky Italia acquired the national broadcasting package for Serie C. Matches were shown on Sky channels and streamed through NOW, with 1,143 matches available in exclusive national coverage and 48 matches in co-exclusive coverage per season. The package included the regular season, the promotion play-offs, the Supercoppa di Serie C and the Coppa Italia Serie C from the round of 16.

== Attendances ==
The top 10 clubs with the highest average home attendance:

#	Club	Average
1	Catania	15,175
2	Cesena	9,554
3	Vizenca	7,958
4	SPAL	6,514
5	Avellino	6,488
6	Mantova	5,654
7	Benevento	4,917
8	Taranto	4,882
9	Pescara	4,259
10	Ancona	4,165
