= Andrea Tiritiello =

Italian footballer (born 1995)

Personal information
- Date of birth: 28 March 1995 (age 31)
- Place of birth: Porto Azzurro, Italy
- Height: 1.88 m (6 ft 2 in)
- Position: Defender

Team information
- Current team: Virtus Entella
- Number: 6

Youth career
- –2014: Livorno

Senior career*
Years	Team	Apps	(Gls)
2014	Livorno	0	(0)
2014–2015	Poggibonsi	28	(3)
2015–2016	Gavorrano	32	(2)
2016–2017	Tuttocuoio	23	(2)
2017–2018	Fidelis Andria	26	(3)
2018–2022	Cosenza	41	(3)
2019–2020	→ Virtus Francavilla (loan)	37	(0)
2022–2024	Lucchese	67	(5)
2024–	Virtus Entella	64	(11)
- * Club domestic league appearances and goals as of 13 May 2026

Andrea Tiritiello (born 28 March 1995) is an Italian football player who plays for Serie B club Virtus Entella.

== Club career ==
He is a product of Livorno youth teams. He made several bench appearances for Livorno's senior squad in 2013–14 Serie A season, but did not see any time on the field.

After Livorno, he spent two seasons in Serie D.

He made his Serie C debut for Tuttocuoio on 28 August 2016 in a game against Prato, as a 90th-minute substitute for Diego Borghini.

On 25 July 2018, he signed a three-year contract with Serie B club Cosenza.

On 8 January 2019, he joined Virtus Francavilla on loan. On 9 August 2019, the loan was renewed.

On 26 August 2022, Tiritiello moved to Lucchese.
