= 2023–24 Fermana FC season =

Fermana FC
2023–24 season
- Manager: Stefano Protti (from 12 October)
- Stadium: Stadio Bruno Recchioni
- Serie C: 20th
- Biggest defeat: Fermana 0–4 Cesena; Pontedera 4–0 Fermana

The 2023–24 season is the club's 104th season in existence and the seventh consecutive season in the Serie C, the Italian third division.

== Competitions ==
=== Overall record ===
Competition	First match	Last match	Starting round	Final position	Record							
Competition	First match	Last match	Starting round	Final position	Pld	W	D	L	GF	GA	GD	Win %
Serie C	1 September 2023	28 April 2024	Matchday 1		29	3	11	15	18	44	−26	10.34
Coppa Italia Serie C	5 October 2023		First round	First round	1	0	0	1	1	6	−5	0.00
Total					30	3	11	16	19	50	−31	10.00

Last updated: 2 March 2024
Source: Competitions

=== Serie C ===
==== League table ====
Pos	Team	Pld	W	D	L	GF	GA	GD	Pts	Qualification
16	Ancona (E, R)	38	10	12	16	41	51	−10	42	Phoenix in Serie D
17	Vis Pesaro	38	8	15	15	39	47	−8	39	Relegation play-outs
18	Recanatese (R)	38	10	8	20	47	65	−18	38	Relegation play-outs
19	Fermana (Note: Automatically relegated for having more than eight points of distance from 16th-placed team Ancona.) (R)	38	6	13	19	30	59	−29	31	Relegation to Serie D
20	Olbia (R)	38	6	8	24	25	67	−42	26	Relegation to Serie D

Updated to match(es) played on 28 April 2024. Source: Lega Pro, Soccerway (in English)
Rules for classification: 1) Points; 2) Head-to-head points; 3) Head-to-head goal difference; 4) Goal difference; 5) Goals scored; 6) Lower goals against; 7) Wins; 8) Lower losses; 9) Away wins; 10) Lower home losses.
(Note: Head-to-head record is used only after all the matches between the teams in question have been played)
(E) Eliminated; (R) Relegated

==== Results summary ====
Overall								Home						Away					
Pld	W	D	L	GF	GA	GD	Pts	W	D	L	GF	GA	GD	W	D	L	GF	GA	GD
27	3	9	15	18	44	−26	18	2	5	7	10	22	−12	1	4	8	8	22	−14

Last updated: 2 March 2024.
Source: Worldfootball

==== Results by round ====
Round	1	2	3	4	5	6	7	8	9	10	11	12	13	14	15	16	17	18	19	20	21	22	23	24	25	26	27	28	29
Ground	A	H	A	H	H	A	H	A	H	A	H	A	A	H	A	H	A	H	A	H	A	H	A	A	H	A	H	A	H
Result	L	W	D	L	L	D	L	D	L	L	D	L	L	L	L	D	D	W	D	D	L	L	W	L	L	L	D	D	D
Position	20	12	10	13	17	16	18	18	19	20	20	20	20	20	20	20	20	20	20	20	20	20	20	20	20	20	20	20	

Updated to match(es) played on 2 March 2024. Source: Worldfootball
A = Away; H = Home; W = Win; D = Draw; L = Loss

==== Matches ====
The league fixtures were unveiled on 7 August 2023.

1 September 2023 1	Carrarese	3–0	Fermana	Carrara
CEST (UTC+2)

9 September 2023 2	Fermana	1–0	Pontedera	Fermo
CEST (UTC+2)				Stadium: Stadio Bruno Recchioni

16 September 2023 3	Gubbio	0–0	Fermana	Gubbio
CEST (UTC+2)

19 September 2023 4	Fermana	0–1	Recanatese	Fermo
CEST (UTC+2)				Stadium: Stadio Bruno Recchioni

23 September 2023 5	Fermana	0–4	Cesena	Fermo
CEST (UTC+2)				Stadium: Stadio Bruno Recchioni

2 October 2023 6	Vis Pesaro	2–2	Fermana	Pesaro
CEST (UTC+2)

9 October 2023 7	Fermana	0–2	Perugia	Fermo
CEST (UTC+2)				Stadium: Stadio Bruno Recchioni

15 October 2023 8	SPAL	0–0	Fermana	Ferrara
CEST (UTC+2)

22 October 2023 9	Fermana	0–2	Virtus Entella	Fermo
CEST (UTC+2)				Stadium: Stadio Bruno Recchioni

25 October 2023 10	Olbia	2–1	Fermana	Olbia
CEST (UTC+2)

29 October 2023 11	Fermana	1–1	Ancona	Fermo
CET (UTC+1)				Stadium: Stadio Bruno Recchioni

6 November 2023 12	Pineto	2–0	Fermana	Pineto
CET (UTC+1)

12 November 2023 13	Sestri Levante	3–0	Fermana	Sestri Levante
CET (UTC+1)

19 November 2023 14	Fermana	2–3	Arezzo	Fermo
CET (UTC+1)				Stadium: Stadio Bruno Recchioni

25 November 2023 15	Rimini	1–0	Fermana	Rimini
CET (UTC+1)

3 December 2023 16	Fermana	1–1	Torres	Fermo
CET (UTC+1)				Stadium: Stadio Bruno Recchioni

10 December 2023 17	Lucchese	0–0	Fermana	Lucca
CET (UTC+1)

16 December 2023 18	Fermana	2–1	Juventus Next Gen	Fermo
CET (UTC+1)				Stadium: Stadio Bruno Recchioni

23 December 2023 19	Pescara	1–1	Fermana	Pescara
CET (UTC+1)

6 January 2024 20	Fermana	0–0	Carrarese	Fermo
CET (UTC+1)				Stadium: Stadio Bruno Recchioni

13 January 2024 21	Pontedera	4–0	Fermana	Pontedera
CET (UTC+1)

21 January 2024 22	Fermana	0–2	Gubbio	Fermo
CET (UTC+1)				Stadium: Stadio Bruno Recchioni

26 January 2024 23	Recanatese	1–3	Fermana	Recanati
CET (UTC+1)

3 February 2024 24	Cesena	1–0	Fermana	Cesena
CET (UTC+1)

10 February 2024 25	Fermana	0–2	Vis Pesaro	Fermo
CET (UTC+1)				Stadium: Stadio Bruno Recchioni

14 February 2024 26	Perugia	1–0	Fermana	Perugia
CET (UTC+1)

18 February 2024 27	Fermana	1–1	SPAL	Fermo
CET (UTC+1)				Stadium: Stadio Bruno Recchioni

25 February 2024 28	Virtus Entella	1–1	Fermana	Chiavari
CET (UTC+1)				Stadium: Stadio Comunale

2 March 2024 29	Fermana	2–2	Olbia	Fermo
CET (UTC+1)				Stadium: Stadio Bruno Recchioni

=== Coppa Italia Serie C ===
5 October 2023 First round	Pescara	6–1	Fermana	Pescara
CET (UTC+1)
