= Ciro Ginestra =

Italian footballer and manager (born 1978)

Personal information
- Date of birth: 3 August 1978 (age 48)
- Place of birth: Pozzuoli, Italy
- Height: 1.80 m (5 ft 11 in)
- Position: Forward

Team information
- Current team: Guidonia Montecelio (head coach)

Youth career
- 1995–1996: Puteolana

Senior career*
Years	Team	Apps	(Gls)
1996–1998	Venezia	7	(1)
1998–1999	SPAL	33	(10)
1999–2000	Ternana	15	(1)
2000	Venezia	6	(0)
2000–2001	Siena	7	(0)
2001	Modena	10	(2)
2001–2002	Pistoiese	14	(0)
2002–2003	Padova	45	(28)
2003–2005	Venezia	14	(0)
2005	Padova	16	(6)
2005–2006	Frosinone	34	(11)
2006–2007	Perugia	29	(5)
2007–2010	Gallipoli	50	(22)
2010–2011	Crotone	47	(13)
2011–2012	Sorrento	32	(21)
2012–2015	Salernitana	27	(17)

International career
1998–2000	Italy U21	1	(0)

Managerial career
- 2015–2016: Salernitana U17
- 2016: Sangiovannese
- 2017–2018: Team Altamura
- 2018: Fidelis Andria
- 2018: Bisceglie
- 2018: Bisceglie
- 2019–2020: Casertana
- 2020–2021: Picerno
- 2021–2022: Fidelis Andria
- 2022–2023: Team Altamura
- 2023: Barletta
- 2024: Virtus Francavilla
- 2025–2026: Guidonia Montecelio
- 2026–: Guidonia Montecelio
- * Club domestic league appearances and goals

Ciro Ginestra (born 3 August 1978) is an Italian football manager and a former player who is the head coach of Serie C Group B club Guidonia Montecelio.

As a player, he was a journeyman striker whose career has included representing over 13 clubs, with much of his success in the third tier of Italian football. He is known for his prowess on the pitch and has regularly scored goals in the lower levels of Italian football. Earlier in his career, he represented the Italy national U21 team.

== Career ==
Ginestra started his career at Serie D club Puteolana. In the summer of 1996, he was signed by Venezia, where he won promotion to Serie A in 1998 as the runners-up of Serie B. He did not feature often in Venezia's Serie A campaign and instead spent the next two seasons out on loan, first at SPAL and then at Ternana. While at SPAL, he had a relatively successful campaign in the 1998–99 season, scoring 10 goals in 33 league appearances. He returned to Veneziafrom his loan periods in January 2000 and played his first match in Serie A on 26 March 2000. At the end of the season, Venezia failed to maintain its Serie A status, and consequently, Ginestra left the club to join Siena, who were then in Serie B. In the middle of that season, after failing to maintain his place on the side, he joined Modena of Serie C1. The following season, he signed for Pistoiese of Serie B, but he again left mid-season for another third-division club, this timePadova. After helping Padova reach the playoff semi-final in 2003 and narrowly missing out on promotion, he was re-signed by his old club Venezia, who were now back in Serie B. In January 2005, 6 months before Venezia went bankrupt, Ginestra re-signed for another of his old clubs Padova of the Serie C1.

This was only a short spell back at Padova, as in the summer of 2005, Ginestra was signed by Frosinone and won Promotion from Serie C1 to Serie B via the playoffs. As he was not in the manager's plans for Frosinone's Serie B campaign, he was allowed to join Perugia and so returned to Serie C1. After he scored 2 in the opening match of the Serie C1 2007–08 season, he was signed by Gallipoli, who were also in the same division. In January 2010, he signed a 3-year contract with Crotone. This three-year contract was interrupted when in July 2011 he signed a 2-year contract with Sorrento. As of 15 December 2011 he has been an immediate success with the Rossoneri and has scored 13 goals in 22 games. This high scoring rate has seen Sorrento placed in the top half of the table for a second consecutive season, where they are again pushing for Promotion to Serie B. On 3 August 2012, he moved on a free transfer to the Seconda Divisione club Salernitana.

== Coaching career ==
He resigned as coach of the Serie C side Bisceglie on 7 December 2018.

On 6 June 2019, he was hired by Serie C club Casertana, signing a 2-year contract with the club holding an option to extend it for a third year. On 24 June 2020, his contract with Casertana was terminated.

On 16 September 2020, he joined Serie D club Picerno. He was sacked on 26 February 2021 due to poor results.

On 12 October 2021, Ginestra was appointed the new head coach of Serie C club Fidelis Andria until the end of the season. He was relieved from his job on 1 February 2022 due to negative results.

After two short experiences in Serie D with Team Altamura and Barletta, in June 2024, he was hired by Virtus Francavilla for the club's upcoming campaign in the Italian fourth tier.

After being sacked in December 2024, Ginestra took over at Guidonia Montecelio, another Serie D club, in January 2025, guiding them to promotion to Serie C. After leaving Guidonia in May 2026, he was re-hired on 23 September 2026.

== Honours ==
=== Player ===
Gallipoli

- Lega Pro Prima Divisione: 2009

=== Coach ===
Guidonia Montecelio

- Serie D: 2024–25 (Group G)
