= Maguette =

Maguette is a masculine given name. Notable people with the name include:

- Maguette Diongue, French footballer
- Maguette Fall, Senegalese footballer
- Maguette Gueye, Senegalese footballer
- Maguette Ndiaye, Senegalese football referee
- Pape Maguette Kebe, Senegalese footballer

== See also ==
- Muguette
