= Salvatore Santoro (footballer) =

Italian footballer (born 1999)

Personal information
- Date of birth: 9 March 1999 (age 27)
- Place of birth: Naples, Italy
- Height: 1.84 m (6 ft 0 in)
- Position: Midfielder

Team information
- Current team: Guidonia
- Number: 14

Youth career
- –2017: Casertana

Senior career*
Years	Team	Apps	(Gls)
2017–2021	Casertana	91	(1)
2021–2024	Pisa	0	(0)
2021–2022	→ Pistoiese (loan)	18	(0)
2022	→ Imolese (loan)	8	(0)
2023	→ Monterosi (loan)	14	(0)
2023–2024	→ Pro Vercelli (loan)	33	(1)
2024–2025	Arezzo	27	(0)
2025–	Guidonia	35	(0)
- * Club domestic league appearances and goals as of 30 April 2026

Salvatore Santoro (born 9 March 1999) is an Italian professional footballer who plays as a midfielder for Serie C Group B club Guidonia.

== Club career ==
Born in Naples, Santoro started his career in Casertana, and was promoted to first team for the 2017–18 season. He played 101 matches for the club in four Serie C seasons.

On 6 July 2021, he signed with Pisa, being was loaned to Pistoiese on 31 August 2021.

At the middle of the season, on 31 January 2022, he joined on loan to Imolese. On 3 January 2023, Santoro was loaned by Monterosi. On 31 August 2023, Santoro moved on a new loan to Pro Vercelli.

On 30 August 2024, Santoro signed a one-season contract with Arezzo. The following year, he was signed to Guidonia, a club recently founded from the relocation of his former team Monterosi.

== Personal life ==
In June 2022, Santoro married Annachiara "AnnaKiara" Sorrentino, the daughter of singer Sal Da Vinci. The couple had a baby boy, Antonio, in May 2023.
