= Andrea Errico =

Italian footballer (born 1999)

Personal information
- Date of birth: 1 January 1999 (age 27)
- Place of birth: Rome, Italy
- Height: 1.78 m (5 ft 10 in)
- Position: Midfielder

Team information
- Current team: Guidonia
- Number: 8

Youth career
- –2016: Savio Calcio
- 2016–2020: Frosinone

Senior career*
Years	Team	Apps	(Gls)
2019–2022	Frosinone	0	(0)
2019–2020	→ Viterbese (loan)	25	(2)
2020–2021	→ Avellino (loan)	4	(0)
2021–2022	→ Viterbese (loan)	12	(0)
2022	→ Monterosi (loan)	6	(0)
2023–2024	Romana	22	(0)
2024–	Guidonia	62	(1)

International career^{‡}
2019	Italy U20	1	(0)
- * Club domestic league appearances and goals as of 30 April 2026 ‡ National team caps and goals as of 18 November 2019

Andrea Errico (born 1 January 1999) is an Italian professional footballer who plays as a midfielder for Serie C Group B club Guidonia.

== Club career ==
Born in Rome, Errico started his career with Frosinone.

In 2019, he was loaned to Serie C club Viterbese. Enrrico made his professional debut on 25 August 2019 against Paganese.

For the 2020–21 season, he was loaned to Avellino.

On 9 July 2021, he was loaned again to Viterbese. On 13 January 2022, he moved on a new loan to Monterosi.

== International career ==
On 12 November 2019, Errico was called for Italy U20. He made his debut on 18 November against Switzerland.
