= 2024–25 Serie D =

Serie D
- Season: 2024–25
- Champions: Livorno (1st title)
- Promoted: Bra; Ospitaletto; Dolomiti Bellunesi; Forlì; Livorno; Sambenedettese; Guidonia Montecelio; Casarano; Siracusa
- Relegated: Chieri; Borgaro Nobis; Fossano; Albenga (excluded); Magenta; Fanfulla; Ciliverghe Mazzano; Arconatese; Caravaggio; Chions; Montecchio Maggiore; Lavis; Zenith Prato; Fiorenzuola; United Riccione; Follonica Gavorrano; Figline; Sangiovannese; Fezzanese; Civitanovese; Roma City; Città di Isernia; Fermana; Ilvamaddalena; COS Sarrabus Ogliastra; Atletico Uri; Terracina; Ugento; Brindisi; Angri; Costa d'Amalfi; Licata; Città di Sant'Agata; Locri 1909; Akragas (withdrew)

The 2024–25 Serie D was the seventy-fifth season of the top-level Italian non-professional football championship. It represents the fourth tier in the Italian football league system.

== Rules ==
The season will provide a total of nine promotions to Serie C (those being the winners of all nine groups). Teams placed between second and fifth for each group will play a so-called "playoff tournament," starting with two one-legged games played at the best-placed team's home venue:

- 2nd-placed team vs 5th-placed team;
- 3rd-placed team vs 4th-placed team.

In case of a draw by the end of the game, two extra times will be played; in case of no winner after that, the best-placed team will advance to the final.

The two winning teams will then play a one-legged final, to be hosted at the best-placed team's home venue, with the same rules as in the first round. The nine playoff winners for each group will be prioritized to fill any potential Serie C league vacancies.

The two bottom-placed teams for each league group are automatically relegated to Eccellenza. Two two-legged relegation playoff games (known in Italian as "play-out") will therefore be played between:

- 13th-placed team vs 16th-placed team (for 18-team groups), or 15th-placed team vs 18th-placed team (for 20-team groups);
- 14th-placed team vs 15th-placed team (for 18-team groups), or 16th-placed team vs 17th-placed team (for 20-team groups).

Two extra times will be played in case of an aggregate draw after the second leg; in case of a further aggregate draw, the worst-placed team will be relegated.

In case the two teams have a league gap of at least eight points, the relegation playoff will not take place and the worst-placed team will be automatically relegated instead.

== Teams ==
The league's composition involves nine divisions, grouped geographically and named alphabetically.

=== Teams relegated from Serie C ===
The following teams were relegated from the 2023–24 Serie C:

- From Group A: Fiorenzuola, Pro Sesto;
- From Group B: Recanatese, Fermana, Olbia;
- From Group C: Virtus Francavilla, Monterosi, Brindisi.

Alessandria, who were originally relegated from Serie C, failed to send a valid application in time and were consequently excluded from the league.

=== Teams promoted from Eccellenza ===
The following teams were promoted from Eccellenza:

Abruzzo

- Teramo

Apulia

- Ugento

Basilicata

- Francavilla

Calabria

- Sambiase

Campania

- Real Acerrana
- Sarnese
- Costa d'Amalfi^{[PO]}
- Pompei^{[PO]}

Emilia Romagna

- Cittadella Vis Modena
- Sasso Marconi

Friuli-Venezia Giulia

- Brian Lignano

Lazio

- Amatrice Rieti^{[EX]}
- Terracina

Liguria

- Imperia
- Cairese^{[PO]}

Lombardy

- Oltrepò
- Nuova Sondrio
- Ospitaletto
- Magenta^{[PO]}
- Ciliverghe Mazzano^{[RE]}

Marche

- Civitanovese
- Castelfidardo^{[PO]}

Molise

- Isernia

Piedmont & Aosta Valley

- Borgaro Nobis
- Saluzzo
- Fossano^{[PO]}

Sardinia

- Ilvamaddalena

Sicily

- Nissa
- Enna
- Paternò^{[CI]}

Trentino Alto Adige – Südtirol

- Lavis

Tuscany

- Tuttocuoio
- Siena
- Terranuova Traiana^{[PO]}
- Zenith Prato^{[RE]}

Umbria

- Fulgens Foligno

Veneto

- Vigasio
- Calvi Noale
- Bassano^{[PO]}

^{EX} Originally promoted, successively excluded. ^{PO} Promoted as national playoff winners. ^{CI} Promoted as Coppa Italia Dilettanti winners. ^{RE} Admitted as repechage to fill a vacancy.

=== Admissions ===
On 15 July 2024, the league committee announced that it had admitted SSC Ancona ASD to the league after the original club's exclusion from Serie C, according to the Article 52 of NOIF regulations.

=== Readmissions ===
On 30 July 2024, the league committee announced the readmissions of Zenith Prato, Crema, Ciliverghe Mazzano and Cjarlins Muzane to fill the remaining vacancies.

=== Relocations, mergers and renamings ===
- Clivense was renamed to ChievoVerona.
- LFA Reggio Calabria was renamed to Reggina.
- Canicattì merged with Pro Favara, relocated to Favara and changed its denomination to CastrumFavara.
- Aglianese handed its participation league rights to Pistoiese.
- Portici handed its participation league rights to Savoia.
- Romana handed its participation league rights to Atletico Lodigiani.
- San Marzano merged with Scafatese, keeping the latter's denomination and relocating to Scafati.
- Victor San Marino was renamed San Marino.
- Casatese merged with Merate and changed its denomination to Casatese Merate.
- RG Ticino merged with Pro Novara, relocated to Romentino and changed its denomination to NovaRomentino.
- Monterosi Tuscia relocated to Guidonia Montecelio and changed its denomination to Guidonia Montecelio.

=== Exclusions and withdrawals ===
On 16 July 2024, the Serie D football committee announced Alessandria, Amatrice Rieti, Monte Prodeco and Rotonda failed to submit a valid league application in time.

On 18 February 2025, Albenga (Group A) were excluded from the league after failing to show up for two games during the season.

In March 2025, Akragas (Group I) unilaterally declared their intention to retire from the league due to financial issues.

== Group A ==
Pos	Team	Pld	W	D	L	GF	GA	GD	Pts	Promotion, qualification or relegation
1	Bra (C, P)	36	24	6	6	70	24	+46	78	Promotion to Serie C (Note: If two or more teams finish tied on points in the top of the league, once the tie-breaking criteria have applied, the 1st and the 2nd-placed teams play a tie-breaker, whose winner gets promotion to Serie C.)
2	NovaRomentino (O)	36	21	8	7	75	27	+48	71	Qualification for wild card playoffs (Note: Winning playoffs does not grant promotion to Serie C, but a chance to get promoted in case of vacancies.)
3	Vado	36	19	8	9	51	37	+14	65	Qualification for wild card playoffs
4	Gozzano	36	18	11	7	52	34	+18	65	Qualification for wild card playoffs
5	Lavagnese	36	18	10	8	49	35	+14	64	Qualification for wild card playoffs
6	Città di Varese	36	17	11	8	47	34	+13	62	
7	Ligorna	36	16	10	10	55	42	+13	58	
8	Chisola	36	14	8	14	43	37	+6	50	
9	Saluzzo	36	12	14	10	39	35	+4	50	
10	Sanremese	36	10	15	11	31	33	−2	45	
11	Asti	36	11	12	13	36	46	−10	45	
12	Derthona	36	11	11	14	41	50	−9	44	
13	Oltrepò	36	10	10	16	38	59	−21	40	
14	Imperia	36	10	8	18	52	58	−6	38	
15	Vogherese	36	8	13	15	31	44	−13	37	
16	Cairese (O)	36	9	10	17	32	47	−15	37	Qualification for relegation playoffs (Note: If the 15th-placed team finishes nine or more points ahead of the 18th-placed team, then the relegation playoff is not played, and the 18th-placed team is relegated to Eccellenza directly. If the 16th-placed team finishes nine or more points ahead of the 17th-placed team, then the relegation playoff is not played, and the 17th-placed team is relegated to Eccellenza directly.)
17	Chieri (R)	36	7	10	19	33	58	−25	31	Qualification for relegation playoffs
18	Borgaro Nobis (R)	36	8	4	24	34	77	−43	28	Relegation to Eccellenza
19	Fossano (R)	36	7	5	24	31	63	−32	26	Relegation to Eccellenza
20	Albenga (Note: Albenga were excluded on 18 February 2025 after failing to attend two league games throughout the season.) (R, E)	0	0	0	0	0	0	0	0	Excluded

Rules for classification: (Note: 1) Points; 2) Head-to-head points; 3) Head-to-head goal difference; 4) Goal difference; 5) Goals scored; 6) Draw.)
(C) Champions; (E) Eliminated; (O) Play-off winners; (P) Promoted; (R) Relegated

== Group B ==
Pos	Team	Pld	W	D	L	GF	GA	GD	Pts	Promotion, qualification or relegation
1	Ospitaletto (C, P)	38	21	12	5	66	34	+32	75	Promotion to Serie C
2	Pro Palazzolo (O)	38	20	10	8	69	36	+33	70	Qualification for wild card playoffs
3	Desenzano	38	19	12	7	51	29	+22	69	Qualification for wild card playoffs
4	Casatese Merate	38	19	11	8	58	34	+24	68	Qualification for wild card playoffs
5	Folgore Caratese	38	20	8	10	66	42	+24	68	Qualification for wild card playoffs
6	Varesina	38	17	13	8	61	44	+17	64	
7	ChievoVerona	38	16	9	13	49	37	+12	57	
8	Pro Sesto	38	13	13	12	45	43	+2	52	
9	Club Milano	38	14	7	17	44	50	−6	49	
10	Sant'Angelo	38	11	15	12	41	41	0	48	
11	Nuova Sondrio	38	12	11	15	39	51	−12	47	
12	Breno	38	11	14	13	42	53	−11	47	
13	Castellanzese	38	10	16	12	43	53	−10	46	
14	Vigasio	38	11	12	15	39	41	−2	45	
15	Sangiuliano City	38	11	12	15	39	46	−7	45	
16	Crema	38	11	11	16	48	57	−9	44	
17	Magenta (R)	38	8	12	18	33	53	−20	36	Relegation to Eccellenza
18	Fanfulla (R)	38	6	14	18	28	57	−29	32	Relegation to Eccellenza
19	Ciliverghe Mazzano (R)	38	7	10	21	41	70	−29	31	Relegation to Eccellenza
20	Arconatese (R)	38	7	10	21	33	64	−31	31	Relegation to Eccellenza

Rules for classification:
(C) Champions; (O) Play-off winners; (P) Promoted; (R) Relegated

== Group C ==
Pos	Team	Pld	W	D	L	GF	GA	GD	Pts	Promotion, qualification or relegation
1	Dolomiti Bellunesi (C, P)	38	23	9	6	65	39	+26	78	Promotion to Serie C
2	Treviso	38	22	8	8	59	32	+27	74	Qualification for wild card playoffs
3	Villa Valle	38	19	10	9	62	44	+18	67	Qualification for wild card playoffs
4	Adriese (O)	38	18	12	8	55	31	+24	66	Qualification for wild card playoffs
5	Mestre	38	19	7	12	40	34	+6	64	Qualification for wild card playoffs
6	Campodarsego	38	15	17	6	52	36	+16	62	
7	Brusaporto	38	16	12	10	46	37	+9	60	
8	Luparense	38	13	17	8	48	36	+12	56	
9	Real Calepina	38	15	10	13	44	44	0	55	
10	Cjarlins Muzane	38	15	10	13	50	49	+1	55	
11	Este	38	14	12	12	50	50	0	54	
12	Brian Lignano	38	12	12	14	45	49	−4	48	
13	Calvi Noale	38	12	11	15	44	44	0	47	
14	Bassano	38	11	14	13	43	36	+7	47	
15	Portogruaro	38	10	16	12	32	36	−4	46	
16	Caravaggio (R)	38	11	8	19	42	54	−12	41	Qualification for relegation playoffs
17	Virtus CiseranoBergamo (O)	38	9	13	16	42	55	−13	40	Qualification for relegation playoffs
18	Chions (R)	38	6	12	20	35	59	−24	30	Relegation to Eccellenza
19	Montecchio Maggiore (R)	38	6	9	23	32	55	−23	27	Relegation to Eccellenza
20	Lavis (R)	38	3	3	32	25	91	−66	12	Relegation to Eccellenza

Rules for classification:
(C) Champions; (O) Play-off winners; (P) Promoted; (R) Relegated

== Group D ==
Pos	Team	Pld	W	D	L	GF	GA	GD	Pts	Promotion, qualification or relegation
1	Forlì (C, P)	34	27	3	4	75	24	+51	84	Promotion to Serie C
2	Ravenna (O, I)	34	23	5	6	65	27	+38	74	Qualification for wild card playoffs
3	Lentigione	34	18	11	5	48	27	+21	65	Qualification for wild card playoffs
4	Tau Calcio Altopascio	34	18	9	7	54	27	+27	63	Qualification for wild card playoffs
5	Pistoiese	34	18	7	9	45	23	+22	61	Qualification for wild card playoffs
6	Imolese	34	14	11	9	52	44	+8	53	
7	Cittadella Vis Modena	34	13	8	13	48	40	+8	47	
8	Piacenza	34	10	12	12	38	40	−2	42	
9	Prato	34	11	9	14	34	38	−4	42	
10	Tuttocuoio	34	10	12	12	32	43	−11	42	
11	Progresso	34	10	11	13	24	32	−8	41	
12	San Marino	34	10	8	16	38	51	−13	38	
13	Sasso Marconi	34	9	10	15	39	51	−12	37	
14	Corticella (R)	34	10	6	18	37	65	−28	36	Qualification for relegation playoffs (Note: If the 13th-placed team finishes nine or more points ahead of the 16th-placed team, then the relegation playoff is not played, and the 16th-placed team is relegated to Eccellenza directly. If the 14th-placed team finishes nine or more points ahead of the 15th-placed team, then the relegation playoff is not played, and the 15th-placed team is relegated to Eccellenza directly.)
15	Sammaurese (O)	34	7	10	17	27	37	−10	31	Qualification for relegation playoffs
16	Zenith Prato (Note: 12 points deducted due to having fielded a player who was not regularly signed.) (R)	34	10	8	16	36	51	−15	26	Relegation to Eccellenza
17	Fiorenzuola (R)	34	7	5	22	21	46	−25	26	Relegation to Eccellenza
18	United Riccione (R)	34	5	7	22	22	69	−47	22	Relegation to Eccellenza

Rules for classification:
(C) Champions; (I) Qualification for the Serie C as Spal's vacancy; (O) Play-off winners; (P) Promoted; (R) Relegated

== Group E ==
Pos	Team	Pld	W	D	L	GF	GA	GD	Pts	Promotion, qualification or relegation
1	Livorno (C, P)	34	21	9	4	74	44	+30	72	Promotion to Serie C
2	Fulgens Foligno	34	17	9	8	61	44	+17	60	Qualification for wild card playoffs
3	Seravezza Pozzi (O)	34	16	11	7	53	39	+14	59	Qualification for wild card playoffs
4	Ghiviborgo	34	17	4	13	65	57	+8	55	Qualification for wild card playoffs
5	Orvietana	34	15	8	11	44	41	+3	53	Qualification for wild card playoffs
6	Siena	34	14	10	10	35	32	+3	52	
7	Grosseto	34	13	11	10	39	34	+5	50	
8	Ostia Mare	34	12	9	13	49	53	−4	45	
9	Poggibonsi	34	12	7	15	32	36	−4	43	
10	San Donato Tavarnelle	34	11	10	13	26	26	0	43	
11	Aquila Montevarchi	34	9	14	11	36	39	−3	41	
12	Flaminia	34	10	10	14	42	43	−1	40	
13	Follonica Gavorrano (T)	34	10	10	14	40	45	−5	40	Qualification for relegation playoffs
14	Terranuova Traiana (O)	34	8	15	11	34	47	−13	39	Qualification for relegation playoffs
15	Figline (R)	34	9	11	14	29	33	−4	38	Qualification for relegation playoffs
16	Sporting Trestina (O)	34	9	11	14	35	45	−10	38	Qualification for relegation playoffs
17	Sangiovannese (R)	34	9	9	16	30	38	−8	36	Relegation to Eccellenza
18	Fezzanese (R)	34	6	8	20	35	63	−28	26	Relegation to Eccellenza

Source: Panini
Rules for classification:
(C) Champions; (O) Play-off winners; (P) Promoted; (R) Relegated; (T) Qualified, but not yet for the particular phase indicated

== Group F ==
Pos	Team	Pld	W	D	L	GF	GA	GD	Pts	Promotion, qualification or relegation
1	Sambenedettese (C, P)	34	21	9	4	61	21	+40	72	Promotion to Serie C
2	L'Aquila	34	17	11	6	48	31	+17	62	Qualification for wild card playoffs
3	Teramo (O)	34	17	9	8	51	33	+18	60	Qualification for wild card playoffs
4	Chieti (Note: 1 point deducted due to late payments to a former assistant coach.)	34	16	11	7	52	39	+13	58	Qualification for wild card playoffs
5	Fossombrone	34	12	14	8	44	36	+8	50	Qualification for wild card playoffs
6	Ancona	34	13	8	13	35	40	−5	47	
7	Avezzano (E)	34	13	7	14	41	43	−2	46	Folded
8	Castelfidardo	34	12	9	13	39	34	+5	45	
9	Atletico Ascoli	34	10	13	11	35	39	−4	43	
10	Vigor Senigallia	34	9	15	10	36	38	−2	42	
11	Termoli	34	9	14	11	37	44	−7	41	
12	Recanatese	34	10	10	14	42	53	−11	40	
13	Sora (O)	34	9	13	12	32	39	−7	40	Qualification for relegation playoffs
14	San Nicolò Notaresco (O)	34	10	8	16	37	45	−8	38	Qualification for relegation playoffs
15	Civitanovese (R)	34	8	13	13	31	39	−8	37	Qualification for relegation playoffs
16	Roma City (R)	34	8	11	15	32	36	−4	35	Qualification for relegation playoffs
17	Città di Isernia (R)	34	8	10	16	32	57	−25	34	Relegation to Eccellenza
18	Fermana (Note: 2 points deducted due to financial irregularities.) (R)	34	6	11	17	24	42	−18	27	Relegation to Eccellenza

Rules for classification:
(C) Champions; (E) Eliminated; (O) Play-off winners; (P) Promoted; (R) Relegated

== Group G ==
Pos	Team	Pld	W	D	L	GF	GA	GD	Pts	Promotion, qualification or relegation
1	Guidonia Montecelio (C, P)	34	20	9	5	59	25	+34	69	Promotion to Serie C
2	Gelbison (O)	34	18	10	6	57	37	+20	64	Qualification for wild card playoffs
3	Sarnese	34	18	8	8	54	37	+17	62	Qualification for wild card playoffs
4	Cassino	34	15	13	6	40	25	+15	58	Qualification for wild card playoffs
5	Savoia	34	16	9	9	45	33	+12	57	Qualification for wild card playoffs
6	Paganese	34	15	11	8	41	28	+13	56	
7	Cynthialbalonga	34	15	6	13	49	42	+7	51	
8	Puteolana	34	13	11	10	48	42	+6	50	
9	Trastevere	34	12	8	14	52	55	−3	44	
10	Olbia	34	11	9	14	46	50	−4	42	
11	Latte Dolce	34	11	8	15	52	57	−5	41	
12	Anzio	34	10	10	14	39	57	−18	40	
13	Atletico Lodigiani (O)	34	9	11	14	39	49	−10	38	Qualification for relegation playoffs
14	Real Monterotondo (O)	34	10	8	16	34	39	−5	38	Qualification for relegation playoffs
15	Ilvamaddalena (R)	34	10	8	16	39	41	−2	38	Qualification for relegation playoffs
16	COS Sarrabus Ogliastra (T)	34	8	9	17	35	56	−21	33	Qualification for relegation playoffs
17	Atletico Uri (R)	34	6	11	17	33	53	−20	29	Relegation to Eccellenza
18	Terracina (R)	34	5	9	20	27	63	−36	24	Relegation to Eccellenza

Source: Panini
Rules for classification:
(C) Champions; (O) Play-off winners; (P) Promoted; (R) Relegated; (T) Qualified, but not yet for the particular phase indicated

== Group H ==
Pos	Team	Pld	W	D	L	GF	GA	GD	Pts	Promotion, qualification or relegation
1	Casarano (C, P)	34	21	11	2	72	30	+42	74	Promotion to Serie C
2	Nocerina (O)	34	20	10	4	64	27	+37	70	Qualification for wild card playoffs
3	Martina	34	17	11	6	48	28	+20	62	Qualification for wild card playoffs
4	Fidelis Andria	34	16	9	9	41	29	+12	57	Qualification for wild card playoffs
5	Città di Fasano	34	13	11	10	45	32	+13	50	Qualification for wild card playoffs
6	Matera (E)	34	12	13	9	51	47	+4	49	Folded
7	Virtus Francavilla	34	12	11	11	41	34	+7	47	
8	Nardò	34	13	8	13	47	45	+2	47	
9	Ischia	34	11	12	11	39	45	−6	45	
10	Palmese	34	10	12	12	41	45	−4	42	
11	Gravina	34	11	9	14	43	46	−3	42	
12	Francavilla	34	11	8	15	28	34	−6	41	
13	Real Acerrana	34	11	8	15	37	50	−13	41	
14	Ugento (R)	34	10	7	17	33	51	−18	37	Qualification for relegation playoffs
15	Manfredonia (O)	34	8	11	15	33	51	−18	35	Qualification for relegation playoffs
16	Brindisi (Note: 14 points deducted due to financial irregularities.) (R)	34	9	14	11	44	43	+1	27	Relegation to Eccellenza
17	Angri (R)	34	6	8	20	35	69	−34	26	Relegation to Eccellenza
18	Costa d'Amalfi (R)	34	3	11	20	26	62	−36	20	Relegation to Eccellenza

Source: Panini
Rules for classification:
(C) Champions; (E) Eliminated; (O) Play-off winners; (P) Promoted; (R) Relegated

== Group I ==
Pos	Team	Pld	W	D	L	GF	GA	GD	Pts	Promotion, qualification or relegation
1	Siracusa (C, P)	32	25	3	4	65	16	+49	78	Promotion to Serie C
2	Reggina (O)	32	24	5	3	65	22	+43	77	Qualification for wild card playoffs
3	Scafatese	32	20	5	7	58	26	+32	65	Qualification for wild card playoffs
4	Sambiase	32	15	9	8	40	27	+13	54	Qualification for wild card playoffs
5	Vibonese	32	15	5	12	44	31	+13	50	Qualification for wild card playoffs
6	Nissa	32	11	13	8	48	49	−1	46	
7	Paternò	32	10	14	8	26	32	−6	44	
8	Pompei	32	10	8	14	29	42	−13	38	
9	Ragusa	32	9	11	12	37	37	0	38	
10	Nuova Igea Virtus	32	10	7	15	36	47	−11	37	
11	Sancataldese	32	7	14	11	28	40	−12	35	
12	Enna	32	7	14	11	21	39	−18	35	
13	Acireale (O)	32	8	10	14	35	50	−15	34	Qualification for relegation playoffs
14	CastrumFavara (O)	32	5	15	12	27	40	−13	30	Qualification for relegation playoffs
15	Licata (R)	32	8	4	20	33	55	−22	28	Qualification for relegation playoffs
16	Città di Sant'Agata (R)	32	6	9	17	40	54	−14	27	Qualification for relegation playoffs
17	Locri 1909 (R)	32	6	6	20	32	57	−25	24	Relegation to Eccellenza
18	Akragas (Note: Akragas announced their withdrawal from the Serie D on 12 March 2025 due to significant financial and managerial difficulties.) (R, E)	0	0	0	0	0	0	0	0	Withdrewal

Rules for classification:
(C) Champions; (E) Eliminated; (O) Play-off winners; (P) Promoted; (R) Relegated

== Post-season ==
=== Relegation play-outs ===
The relegation playout games took place on 11 May 2025 and were hosted by the best-placed team in the regular season. In case of a tie after extra time, the best-placed team would escape relegation.

Team 1	Score	Team 2
Cairese	2–0	Chieri
Caravaggio	2–3	CiseranoBergamo
Corticella	0–2	Sammaurese
Follonica Gavorrano	1–2 (aet)	Sporting Trestina
Terranuova Traiana	1–0	Figline
San Nicolò Notaresco	2–1	Civitanovese
Sora	1–0	Roma City
Real Monterotondo	3–1	Ilvamaddalena
Atletico Lodigiani	1–0	COS Sarrabus Ogliastra
Ugento	0–1	Manfredonia
Acireale	2–2 (aet)	Città di Sant'Agata
CastrumFavara	2–0	Licata

== Poule Scudetto ==
=== Group 1 ===
Pos	Team	Pld	W	D	L	GF	GA	GD	Pts
1	Bra	2	2	0	0	6	3	+3	6
2	Ospitaletto (Note: Ospitaletto qualified for final stage as best 2nd-placed team.)	2	1	0	1	5	5	0	3
3	Dolomiti Bellunesi	2	0	0	2	3	6	−3	0

Notes:

Team 1	Score	Team 2
Ospitaletto	2–3	Bra
Dolomiti Bellunesi	2–3	Ospitaletto
Bra	3–1	Dolomiti Bellunesi

=== Group 2 ===
Pos	Team	Pld	W	D	L	GF	GA	GD	Pts
1	Livorno	2	2	0	0	6	3	+3	6
2	Forlì	2	1	0	1	4	4	0	3
3	Sambenedettese	2	0	0	2	3	6	−3	0

Team 1	Score	Team 2
Forlì	3–1	Sambenedettese
Sambenedettese	2–3	Livorno
Livorno	3–1	Forlì

=== Group 3 ===
Pos	Team	Pld	W	D	L	GF	GA	GD	Pts
1	Siracusa	2	2	0	0	5	1	+4	6
2	Casarano	2	1	0	1	5	6	−1	3
3	Guidonia Montecelio	2	0	0	2	3	6	−3	0

Team 1	Score	Team 2
Casarano	1–3	Siracusa
Guidonia Montecelio	3–4	Casarano
Siracusa	2–1	Guidonia Montecelio

=== Final stage ===
Semi-finals
Livorno	2	4	6
Bra	1	1	2
Siracusa	3	2	5
Ospitaletto	2	0	2

Final
Livorno	2
Siracusa	1
