= Frascatore =

Frascatore is an Italian surname. Notable people with the surname include:

- John Frascatore (born 1970), American baseball player
- Paolo Frascatore (born 1992), Italian footballer
