= Riccardo Baroni =

Italian footballer (born 1998)

Personal information
- Date of birth: 19 September 1998 (age 28)
- Place of birth: Florence, Italy
- Height: 1.83 m (6 ft 0 in)
- Position: Centre-back

Team information
- Current team: Guidonia Montecelio
- Number: 30

Youth career
- –2017: Fiorentina

Senior career*
Years	Team	Apps	(Gls)
2017–2018	Fiorentina	0	(0)
2017–2018	→ Lucchese (loan)	28	(1)
2018–2019	Virtus Entella	13	(0)
2019–2020	Fiorentina	0	(0)
2019–2020	→ Siena (loan)	19	(1)
2020–2021	Frosinone	0	(0)
2021–2024	Modena	15	(0)
2022–2023	→ Pontedera (loan)	0	(0)
2024–2026	AlbinoLeffe	66	(3)
2026–	Guidonia Montecelio	1	(0)

International career
2017–2018	Italy U-20	3	(0)
- * Club domestic league appearances and goals as of 22 August 2026

Riccardo Baroni (born 19 September 1998) is an Italian professional footballer who plays as a centre-back for Serie C Group B club Guidonia Montecelio.

== Club career ==
On 27 July 2017, he joined Lucchese on loan. Baroni made his Serie C debut with the club on 27 August 2017 in a game against Robur Siena.

On 17 August 2019, he signed with Serie A club Fiorentina. On 2 September 2019, he was loaned to Siena.

On 2 October 2020 he joined Serie B side Frosinone. He missed most of the season with an injury and did make his Serie B debut.

On 2 July 2021, he signed a three-year contract with Modena. On 28 July 2022, Baroni was loaned to Pontedera.

On 8 January 2024, Baroni signed with AlbinoLeffe until the end of the season.

Since 26 June 2026 he has officially been a footballer for Guidonia Montecelio 1937.

== Personal life ==
He is the son of manager and former player Marco Baroni.

== Honours ==
=== Club ===
Virtus Entella

- Serie C: 2018–19 Group A
