= Eduard Duțu =

Romanian footballer (born 2001)

Personal information
- Date of birth: 18 April 2001 (age 25)
- Place of birth: Rome, Italy
- Height: 1.89 m (6 ft 2 in)
- Position: Centre-back

Team information
- Current team: Bihor Oradea
- Number: 88

Youth career
- 2010–2020: Fiorentina

Senior career*
Years	Team	Apps	(Gls)
2020–2025	Fiorentina	0	(0)
2021–2022	→ Montevarchi (loan)	27	(0)
2022	→ Reggina (loan)	0	(0)
2022–2023	→ Gubbio (loan)	10	(0)
2023–2024	→ Ancona (loan)	8	(0)
2024	→ Virtus Francavilla (loan)	18	(0)
2024–2025	→ Pineto (loan)	8	(0)
2025	→ Foggia (loan)	7	(0)
2025–2026	Latina	20	(0)
2026–	Bihor Oradea	8	(0)

International career
2017	Romania U17	2	(0)
2021	Romania U20	5	(0)
- * Club domestic league appearances and goals as of 31 October 2026

Eduard Duțu (born 18 April 2001) is a professional footballer who plays as a centre back for Liga II club Bihor Oradea. Born in Italy, he was a Romania youth international.

== Club career ==
Duțu is a product of Italian side Fiorentina's youth system, joining the club in 2010.

On 31 August 2021, he joined Montevarchi on loan from Fiorentina. Duțu made his senior debut for Montevarchi on 12 September 2021, in a 0–1 away victory over Fermana in Serie C.

On 22 July 2022, he joined Reggina on loan.

On 6 January 2023, he joined Gubbio on loan.

On 19 July 2023, Duțu was loaned to Ancona. On 4 January 2024, he moved on a new loan to Virtus Francavilla. On 24 January 2025, Duțu joined Foggia on loan.

== Career statistics ==
=== Club ===
As of match played 31 October 2026

Appearances and goals by club, season and competition
Club	Season	League			National Cup (Note: Includes Coppa Italia Serie C, Cupa României)		Europe		Other		Total	
Club	Season	Division	Apps	Goals	Apps	Goals	Apps	Goals	Apps	Goals	Apps	Goals
Montevarchi (loan)	2021–22	Serie C	27	0	0	0	—		—		27	0
Reggina (loan)	2022–23	Serie B	0	0	0	0	—		—		0	0
Gubbio (loan)	2022–23	Serie C	10	0	—		—		1 (Note: Appearances in Serie C-Promotion play-offs)	0	11	0
Ancona (loan)	2023–24	Serie C	8	0	0	0	—		—		8	0
Virtus Francavilla (loan)	2023–24	Serie C	18	0	—		—		2 (Note: Appearances in Serie C-Relegation play-outs)	0	20	0
Pineto (loan)	2024–25	Serie C	8	0	1	0	—		—		9	0
Foggia (loan)	2024–25	Serie C	7	0	—		—		2	0	9	0
Latina	2025–26	Serie C	20	0	6	1	—		—		26	1
Bihor Oradea	2026–27	Liga II	8	0	2	0	—		—		10	0
Career Total			106	0	9	1	—		5	0	120	1

== Honours ==
Latina

- Coppa Italia Serie C runner-up: 2025–26
