= Alessandro Malomo =

Italian footballer (born 1991)

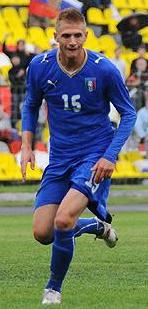

Personal information
- Date of birth: 12 April 1991 (age 35)
- Place of birth: Rome, Italy
- Height: 1.90 m (6 ft 3 in)
- Position: Centre-back

Team information
- Current team: Guidonia
- Number: 3

Senior career*
Years	Team	Apps	(Gls)
2010–2011	Roma	0	(0)
2010–2011	→ Verona (loan)	2	(0)
2011	Prato	8	(0)
2011–2012	AlbinoLeffe	9	(0)
2012–2014	Prato	50	(2)
2014–2016	Pavia	49	(4)
2016–2017	Venezia	23	(0)
2017–2018	Vicenza	27	(2)
2018–2020	Triestina	54	(3)
2020–2022	Südtirol	36	(3)
2022–2023	Foggia	10	(0)
2022–2023	→ Triestina (loan)	10	(0)
2023–2024	Triestina	28	(2)
2024–2025	Trapani	16	(0)
2025–	Guidonia	8	(0)

International career
2009–2010	Italy U-19	6	(0)
2010	Italy U-20	3	(0)
2011	Italy U-21 Serie B	1	(0)
- * Club domestic league appearances and goals as of 22 October 2025

Alessandro Malomo (born 12 April 1991) is an Italian footballer who plays as a centre-back but sometimes as right-back for Serie C Group B club Guidonia.

== Club career ==
Born in Rome, Italian capital, Malomo started his career at A.S. Roma. In August 2010 he left Roma's Primavera under-20 team and signed by Hellas Verona F.C. He only made a handful appearances.

=== Prato ===
In January 2011 he was farmed to Prato in co-ownership deal Prato. Despite only 8 appearances in the fourth division, he played 3 out of 4 possible matches in promotion play-offs. Prato lost the playoffs to Carrarese but later promoted to fill the vacancy in the third division.

=== AlbinoLeffe ===
The co-ownership deal was renewed on 24 June but in July he was signed by Serie B club AlbinoLeffe for €100,000 from Prato, and the capital club retained the remain 50% registration rights after the transaction. Malomo made his debut in the first match of 2011–12 Serie B, losing to Cittadella as centre-back.

=== Roma return ===
After AlbinoLeffe relegated and heavily penalized for up coming 2012–13 season due to 2011–12 Italian football scandal, Roma bought back Malomo for €250,000 on 22 June 2012.

=== Prato return ===
On 29 August Malomo returned to Prato in co-ownership with Roma, for just €50. Former Leffe team-mate Andrea Beduschi also sold to the same club in co-ownership deal. In June 2013 Roma gave up the remain 50% registration rights for free.

=== Pavia ===
On 15 July 2012 Malomo joined to Pavia with his teammate Alessandro Corvesi.

=== Venezia ===
In the summer of 2016 it was bought by Venezia.

=== Südtirol ===
In October 2020, he joined F.C. Südtirol as a free agent.

=== Foggia ===
On 20 July 2022, Malomo joined Foggia on a two-year contract.

=== Triestina ===
On 4 January 2023, he returned on loan to Triestina, with Triestina holding an obligation to buy his rights in case the club avoided relegation from Serie C in the 2022–23 season. Triestina stayed in Serie C and the transfer became permanent. On 28 August 2024, Malomo's contract with Triestina was terminated by mutual consent.

== International career ==
Malomo received his first call-up from Italy national teams system in 2008, for a U-19 training camp. He was surprisingly received a call-up from U-21 team in March 2009, for the fourth round of 2009–10 Four Nations Tournament. The tournament usually played by U-20 but Pierluigi Casiraghi used the match to prepare for the final round of 2009 U-21 Euro, selecting junior players (player born in 1988 or after) for that round (players born in 1986 or after were eligible). Malomo did not play that match nor in the final round. He remained in Massimo Piscedda's U-19 team in 2009–10 season, which he played the friendly against Denmark in September. However, he only able to play the next match in April, replacing injured Albertazzi. Malomo did not play any match in U-19 qualifying in November 2009 but played twice in the elite round in May 2010. He also played in the finals, both replacing Andrea Adamo. In 2010–11 season, he was promoted to U-20 team (the feeder team of U-21 team) and played the first 3 rounds of 2010–11 Four Nations Tournament. After signed by a Serie B team, he was picked by Piscedda for Italy under-21 Serie B representative team against Russian First League Selection in November, winning 2–1.
