= Cristian Riggio =

Italian footballer (born 1996)

Personal information
- Date of birth: 4 June 1996 (age 30)
- Place of birth: Crotone, Italy
- Height: 1.82 m (6 ft 0 in)
- Position: Defender

Team information
- Current team: Guidonia

Youth career
- –2016: Crotone

Senior career*
Years	Team	Apps	(Gls)
2013–2018	Crotone	0	(0)
2016–2017	→ Akragas (loan)	30	(0)
2017–2018	→ Catanzaro (loan)	24	(2)
2018–2021	Catanzaro	47	(2)
2021	→ Monopoli (loan)	15	(0)
2021–2022	Monopoli	5	(0)
2022	Fidelis Andria	14	(0)
2022–2023	Viterbese	28	(1)
2023–2024	Taranto	24	(1)
2024–2026	Potenza	51	(1)
2026–	Guidonia	0	(0)
- * Club domestic league appearances and goals as of 26 April 2026

Cristian Riggio (born 4 June 1996) is an Italian professional footballer who plays as a defender for Serie C Group B club Guidonia.

== Career ==
He made his Serie C debut for Akragas on 28 August 2016 in a game against Vibonese.

After playing for Catanzaro on loan in the 2017–18 season, he joined the club on a permanent basis on 20 July 2018, signing a 2-year contract.

On 6 January 2021, he joined Monopoli on loan with an obligation to buy at the end of the 2020–21 season.

On 8 January 2022, he moved to Fidelis Andria.

On 6 August 2022, Riggio signed with Viterbese.

On 13 July 2023, Riggio joined Taranto on a two-year contract.
