= Franco Ferrari (footballer, born 1995) =

Argentine professional footballer

Personal information
- Date of birth: 10 August 1995 (age 31)
- Place of birth: Rosario, Argentina
- Height: 1.91 m (6 ft 3 in)
- Position: Forward

Team information
- Current team: Guidonia
- Number: 30

Youth career
- –2014: Unión

Senior career*
Years	Team	Apps	(Gls)
2014	Scandicci	3	(0)
2014–2015	Castelfiorentino	17	(11)
2015–2016	Montecatini	23	(12)
2016–2019	Genoa	0	(0)
2017	→ Tuttocuoio (loan)	19	(6)
2017–2018	→ Pistoiese (loan)	34	(13)
2018–2019	→ Brescia (loan)	4	(0)
2019	→ Piacenza (loan)	21	(12)
2019–2022	Napoli	0	(0)
2019–2020	→ Bari (loan)	14	(1)
2020	→ Livorno (loan)	9	(2)
2020–2021	→ Como (loan)	28	(5)
2021–2022	→ Pescara (loan)	40	(19)
2022–2025	Vicenza	86	(36)
2025–2026	Salernitana	32	(7)
2026–	Guidonia	2	(0)
- * Club domestic league appearances and goals as of 30 August 2026

Franco Ferrari (born 10 August 1995) is an Argentine professional footballer who plays as forward for Serie C Group B club Guidonia. He also holds Italian citizenship.

== Club career ==
He made his Serie C debut for Tuttocuoio on 22 January 2017 in a game against Lupa Roma.

On 3 August 2018, he joined Brescia on loan.

On 14 January 2019, he moved on to another loan, to Piacenza.

On 3 August 2019, Ferrari joined Serie C club Bari on loan from Napoli until 30 June 2020.

On 30 January 2020 he moved on loan to Livorno.

On 3 October 2020, he was loaned to Como.

On 3 August 2021, he joined Pescara on loan.

On 22 July 2022, Ferrari signed a three-year contract with Vicenza.

In the summer of 2025, he joined US Salernitana 1919, who were recently relegated to Serie C.

== Personal life ==
Ferrari's brother, Gianluca, is also a professional footballer.
