= Andrea Beduschi =

Italian footballer (born 1992)

Personal information
- Date of birth: 25 February 1992 (age 34)
- Place of birth: Treviglio, Italy
- Height: 1.85 m (6 ft 1 in)
- Position: Centre-back

Youth career
- AlbinoLeffe

Senior career*
Years	Team	Apps	(Gls)
2010–2014	AlbinoLeffe	16	(1)
2011–2012	→ SPAL (loan)	18	(0)
2012–2013	→ Prato (loan)	23	(0)
2014–2015	Monza	15	(0)
2015–2016	Lecce	18	(1)
2016–2018	Vicenza	0	(0)
2016–2017	→ Prato (loan)	15	(0)
2017–2018	→ Pro Piacenza (loan)	16	(0)
2019–2020	Forlì	9	(0)
2020–	Brusaporto	62	(3)
- * Club domestic league appearances and goals as of 20 December 2023

Andrea Beduschi (born 25 February 1992) is an Italian footballer who plays for Serie D club Brusaporto.

== Biography ==
Born in Treviglio, in the Province of Bergamo, Lombardy, Beduschi started his career at AlbinoLeffe, which also from the same province. In 2011, he was signed by SPAL in a co-ownership deal. In June 2012 AlbinoLeffe bought back Beduschi. On 29 August 2012 Beduschi and former AlbinoLeffe team-mate Malomo, were signed by Prato in another co-ownership deals, from AlbinoLeffe and Roma respectively. In June 2013 AlbinoLeffe bought back Beduschi.

In summer 2014 Beduschi was signed by Monza. On 22 January 2015 Beduschi was signed by Lecce.

After not playing in the 2018–19 season, on 23 August 2019 he signed a 1-year contract with Fano. On 2 January 2020, his Fano contract was terminated by mutual consent.
