= Muguette =

Muguette is a feminine given name. Notable people with the name include:

- Muguette Dini (born 1940), French politician
- Muguette "Megs" Jenkins (1917–1998), English actress

== See also ==
- Maguette
