= Diego Zuppel =

Italian footballer (born 2002)

Personal information
- Date of birth: 1 November 2002 (age 24)
- Place of birth: Castiglione del Lago, Italy
- Height: 1.92 m (6 ft 4 in)
- Position: Forward

Team information
- Current team: Novara (on loan from Guidonia)
- Number: 9

Youth career
- –2019: Perugia
- 2019–2020: Arezzo
- 2021–2022: Spezia

Senior career*
Years	Team	Apps	(Gls)
2020–2021	Arezzo	14	(2)
2022–2023	Spezia	0	(0)
2022–2023	→ Messina (loan)	22	(1)
2023–2024	Virtus Francavilla	15	(0)
2024	Acireale	14	(7)
2024–2026	Trapani	10	(1)
2025	→ Latina (loan)	8	(1)
2025–2026	→ Guidonia (loan)	17	(4)
2026–	Guidonia	13	(2)
2026–	→ Novara (loan)	0	(0)
- * Club domestic league appearances and goals as of 30 April 2026

Diego Zuppel (born 1 November 2002) is an Italian football player who plays for Serie C Group A club Novara on loan from Guidonia.

== Club career ==
He made his professional Serie C debut for Arezzo on 27 September 2021 in a game against Feralpisalò.

In August 2021, he joined Serie A club Spezia and was assigned to their Under-19 (primavera) squad. He was also included in the senior team's roster.

On 1 August 2022, Zuppel was loaned to Messina.

On 24 August 2023, Zuppel moved to Virtus Francavilla on a permanent basis.

On 10 July 2024, he joined Trapani

On 14 January 2026 moved to Guidonia Montecelio 1937 FC

On 22 August 2026 was loaned to Novara
