= Christian D'Urso =

Italian footballer (born 1997)

Personal information
- Date of birth: 26 July 1997 (age 29)
- Place of birth: Rieti, Italy
- Height: 1.78 m (5 ft 10 in)
- Position: Midfielder

Team information
- Current team: Guidonia
- Number: 18

Youth career
- –2015: Roma

Senior career*
| Years | Team | Apps | (Gls) |
| 2015–2019 | Roma | 0 | (0) |
| 2016 | → Latina (loan) | 15 | (0) |
| 2017 | → Carpi (loan) | 1 | (0) |
| 2017–2018 | → Ascoli (loan) | 18 | (2) |
| 2018–2019 | → Apollon Smyrnis (loan) | 28 | (1) |
| 2019–2022 | Cittadella | 71 | (7) |
| 2022 | → Perugia (loan) | 12 | (1) |
| 2022–2024 | Cosenza | 39 | (4) |
| 2023–2024 | → Triestina (loan) | 29 | (3) |
| 2024–2026 | Triestina | 63 | (6) |
| 2026– | Guidonia | 1 | (0) |

International career^{‡}
| 2015 | Italy U18 | 1 | (0) |
| 2015 | Italy U19 | 3 | (0) |
| 2016–2017 | Italy U20 | 4 | (0) |
- * Club domestic league appearances and goals as of 30 August 2026 ‡ National team caps and goals as of 9 November 2017

Christian D'Urso (born 26 July 1997) is an Italian professional football midfielder who plays for Serie C Group B club Guidonia.

== Club career ==
=== Early career ===
D'Urso was born in Rieti, Italy. He began his professional career in the youth teams of local Lazio club and Serie A giants A.S. Roma. After playing in the youth teams, D'Urso became a mainstay in the Primavera side and went on to make over fifty appearances under manager Alberto de Rossi, in the Campionato Nazionale Primavera and UEFA Youth League.

==== 2016–17 season ====
After impressing, D'Urso was loaned out to Serie B side Latina in order to gain match experience in professional leagues. He made his debut for Latina on 27 August 2016 in an eventual 1–4 loss to Hellas Verona, playing just over half an hour after coming on as a substitute.

==== Loan to Apollon Smyrnis ====
On 30 August 2018, he joined Apollon Smyrnis of the Super League Greece on a season-long loan from Roma.

=== Cittadella ===
On 7 August 2019, D'Urso signed to Serie B side Cittadella a deal.

=== Perugia ===
On 31 January 2022, D'Urso moved to Perugia on loan with an obligation to buy.

=== Cosenza ===
On 1 July 2022, D'Urso signed with Cosenza.

=== Triestina ===
On 1 September 2023, D'Urso moved on loan to Triestina, with an obligation to buy in case of Triestina's promotion to Serie B. On 5 August 2024, D'Urso returned to Triestina on a permanent basis with a two-year contract.
