= Simone Tascone =

Italian footballer

Personal information
- Date of birth: 18 December 1997 (age 28)
- Place of birth: Naples, Italy
- Height: 1.82 m (5 ft 11 1/2 in)
- Position: Midfielder

Team information
- Current team: Guidonia
- Number: 17

Youth career
- 2015: Ternana

Senior career*
Years	Team	Apps	(Gls)
2014–2015	Frattese	15	(1)
2015–2017	Ternana	1	(0)
2017–2018	Genoa	0	(0)
2017–2018	→ Paganese (loan)	33	(1)
2018–2020	Pescara	0	(0)
2018–2019	→ Fano (loan)	30	(0)
2019–2020	→ Catanzaro (loan)	10	(2)
2020	→ Casertana (loan)	6	(1)
2020	Picerno	0	(0)
2020–2022	Turris	58	(7)
2022–2024	Virtus Entella	42	(4)
2024–2025	Foggia	45	(6)
2025–	Guidonia	26	(1)
- * Club domestic league appearances and goals as of 30 April 2026

Simone Tascone (born 18 December 1997) is an Italian football player who plays for Serie C Group B club Guidonia.

== Club career ==
He made his Serie B debut for Ternana on 20 May 2016 in a game against Brescia. On 25 July 2018, he joined Fano for the 2018–19 season on loan from Pescara, whom he signed for one day before. On 19 August 2019, he joined Catanzaro on loan. On 31 January 2020, he moved on a new loan to Casertana.

On 18 August 2020 he moved to Picerno. On 29 September 2020, before he could play any games for Picerno, he moved again, signing a two-year contract with Turris. On 19 July 2022, Tascone signed with Virtus Entella. On 19 January 2024, Tascone joined Foggia on a 2.5-year contract.
