= Paolo Frascatore =

Italian footballer

Personal information
- Date of birth: 4 January 1992 (age 34)
- Place of birth: Rome, Italy
- Height: 1.87 m (6 ft 1 1/2 in)
- Position: Left back

Team information
- Current team: Guidonia
- Number: 38

Youth career
- Roma

Senior career*
Years	Team	Apps	(Gls)
2011–2017	Roma	0	(0)
2011–2012	→ Benevento (loan)	19	(0)
2012–2013	→ Sassuolo (loan)	11	(0)
2013–2014	→ Pescara (loan)	4	(0)
2014	→ Reggina (loan)	5	(0)
2014–2015	→ Pistoiese (loan)	36	(1)
2015–2016	→ Reggiana (loan)	22	(0)
2016–2017	→ Lausanne (loan)	1	(0)
2017–2018	Südtirol	33	(2)
2018–2019	Carpi	5	(0)
2019–2020	Triestina	30	(0)
2020	Padova	5	(0)
2020–2021	Ternana	12	(0)
2021–2022	Pescara	25	(2)
2022–2024	Turris	46	(4)
2024–2025	Avellino	36	(2)
2025–2026	Salernitana	9	(0)
2026–	Guidonia	15	(1)

International career
2008	Italy U17	6	(0)
2011	Italy U19	2	(0)
2011–2012	Italy U20	9	(0)
2012–2013	Italy U21	9	(0)
- * Club domestic league appearances and goals as of 30 April 2026

Paolo Frascatore (born 4 January 1992) is an Italian footballer who plays for Serie C Group B club Guidonia.

== Club career ==
Frascatore is a product of Roma youth sector.

On 13 July 2011 Frascatore left for Lega Pro Prima Divisione club Benevento, in temporary deal. In June 2012 Benevento excised the buy option but Roma also excised the counter-option by selling Mattia Montini for €200,000 and €50,000 cash to Benevento. Frascatore initially signed a 2-year contract, which was extended to 30 June 2016 circa 2013.

In the summer 2012 Roma sent him on loan to Serie B club Sassuolo. On 9 July 2013 Frascatore was signed by Serie B club Pescara. On 27 January 2014 Frascatore was signed by Reggina.

On 23 July 2014 Frascatore was signed by Lega Pro club Pistoiese in a temporary deal.

On 27 July 2015 he was signed by Reggiana in another temporary deal.

On 31 January 2019 he signed a 1.5-year contract with Triestina.

On 31 January 2020 he signed a 6-month contract with Padova.

On 6 October 2020 he joined Ternana.

On 6 August 2021 he joined Pescara.

On 3 August 2022, Frascatore signed a two-year contract with Turris.

== International career ==
Frascatore started his national team career in 2007 summer training camp for born 1992–93 players. Frascatore played 4 friendlies for Italy U17 team and 2 substitute appearances in 2009 UEFA European Under-17 Football Championship qualification. Frascatore returned to national team in 2011 for 2 friendlies before 2011 UEFA European Under-19 Football Championship elite qualification.

Frascatore all 6 matches of 2011–12 Four Nations Tournament and also played the friendlies against Ghana, Macedonia and Denmark.

On 15 August 2012 he made his debut with the Italy U-21 team, in a friendly match won 3–0 against Netherlands.

== Honours ==
- Campionato Nazionale Primavera: 2011 (Roma U20)
