= Diego Borghini =

Italian football player (born 1997)

Personal information
- Date of birth: 4 March 1997 (age 29)
- Place of birth: Livorno, Italy
- Height: 1.87 m (6 ft 2 in)
- Position: Defender

Team information
- Current team: Guidonia
- Number: 33

Youth career
- –2016: Empoli

Senior career*
Years	Team	Apps	(Gls)
2016–2018	Empoli	0	(0)
2016–2017	→ Tuttocuoio (loan)	14	(1)
2017–2018	→ Gavorrano (loan)	25	(0)
2018–2021	Arezzo	41	(3)
2021–2025	AlbinoLeffe	120	(15)
2025–2026	Benevento	22	(0)
2026–	Guidonia	0	(0)

International career
2014–2015	Italy U18	8	(1)
2015	Italy U19	5	(0)
- * Club domestic league appearances and goals as of 14 August 2026

Diego Borghini (born 4 March 1997) is an Italian professional footballer who plays as a defender for Serie C Group B club Guidonia.

== Club career ==
=== Empoli ===
Born in Livorno, Borghini was a youth exponent from Empoli. Here he played 55 matches and scoring 2 goals for their U-19 team. On 31 January 2015 he received his maiden call-up on the bench in a match against Roma in Serie A, however he remained an unused substitute.

==== Loan to Tuttocuoio ====
On 12 July 2016, Borghini was signed by Serie C side Tuttucuoio on a season-long loan deal. On 31 July, Borghini made his debut for Tuttocuoio in a 3–2 away defeat, after extra-time, against Casertana in the first round of Coppa Italia, he played the entire match. On 28 August he made his Serie C debut for Tuttocuoio in a 2–2 away draw against Prato, he played the entire match. On 31 October, Borghini scored his first professional goal in the 93rd minute of a 2–1 away win over Pontedera. On 21 May he was sent off with a double yellow card in the 90th minute of a 2–2 home draw against Prato. Borghini ended his loan to Tuttocuoio with 16 appearances, including 14 as a starter, and 1 assist, but the team was relegated in Serie D.

==== Loan to Gavorrano ====
On 17 July 2017, Borghini was signed by Serie C club Gavorrano on a season-long loan deal. On 27 August he made his Serie C debut for Gavorrano as a substitute replacing Manuele Malotti in the 77th minute of a 2–1 away defeat against Livorno. On 24 September he played his first match as a starter for Gavorrano, a 1–0 away defeat against Prato. On 8 November, Borghini played his first entire match for Gavorrano, a 0–0 home draw against Arezzo. Borghini ended his season-long loan to Gavorrano with 27 appearances, but Gavorrano was relegated in Serie D.

=== Arezzo ===
On 30 August 2018, Borghini joined to Serie C club Arezzo with an undisclosed fee. On 25 September he made his debut as a substitute replacing Carlo Pelagatti in the 60th minute of a 0–0 away draw against Pisa. On 11 November, Borghini played his first entire match for Arezzo, a 2–2 away draw against Novara. On 27 April 2019 he scored his first goal for the club in the 49th minute of a 2–0 home win over Gozzano. One week later, on 4 May he scored the second goal in the third minute of a 3–0 away win over Pistoiese. On 4 August 2019, Borghini played his first match in Coppa Italia for Arezzo, a 1–0 home win over Turris in the first round, and one week later he scored his first goal in this competition in the 10th minute of a 4–3 away defeat against Crotone in the second round.

=== AlbinoLeffe ===
On 1 February 2021, he signed with AlbinoLeffe.

=== Benevento ===
On 17 July 2025, he signed with Benevento.

== International career ==
Borghini represented Italy at Under 18 and Under 19 level. On 19 August 2014, Borghini made his debut at U-18 level and scored his first goal in the 52nd minute of a 2–1 away win over Norway U-18. On 4 March 2015 he played his first and only entire match for Italy U-18, a 4–0 away win over Hungary U-18, six months later, on 12 August, Borghini made his debut at U-19 level as a substitute replacing Federico Dimarco in the 83rd minute of a 2–1 away win over Croatia U-18. On 3 September he played his first entire match for Italy U-19, a 0–0 home draw against Netherlands U-19 and one month later, on 10 September, Borghini played his first competitive international match, a 3–2 home win over North Macedonia U-19 in the 2016 UEFA European Under-19 Championship qualification.

== Career statistics ==
=== Club ===
As of 2 July 2020

Club	Season	League			Cup		Europe		Other		Total	
Club	Season	League	Apps	Goals	Apps	Goals	Apps	Goals	Apps	Goals	Apps	Goals
Tuttocuoio (loan)	2016–17	Serie C	14	1	1	0	—		1 (Note: All appearance(s) in Serie C play-out.)	0	16	1
Gavorrano (loan)	2017–18	Serie C	25	0	0	0	—		2	0	27	0
Arezzo	2018–19	Serie C	11	2	0	0	—		1 (Note: All appearance(s) in Serie C play-off.)	0	12	2
Arezzo	2019–20	Serie C	18	1	2	1	—		—		20	2
Career total			68	4	3	1	—		4	0	75	5
