= Jacopo Manconi =

Italian footballer

Personal information
- Date of birth: 24 April 1994 (age 32)
- Place of birth: Milan, Italy
- Height: 1.80 m (5 ft 11 in)
- Position: Forward

Team information
- Current team: Casertana
- Number: 10

Youth career
- –2011: F.C. Vigejunior
- 2011–2013: A.S.D. Villanterio Calcio
- 2012–2013: → Novara (loan)

Senior career*
Years	Team	Apps	(Gls)
2013–2019	Novara	52	(3)
2015	→ Lecce (loan)	3	(0)
2016	→ Pavia (loan)	14	(1)
2016–2017	→ Reggiana (loan)	20	(6)
2017	→ Trapani (loan)	15	(4)
2017–2018	→ Carpi (loan)	8	(0)
2018	→ Livorno (loan)	8	(0)
2019–2020	Perugia	0	(0)
2019–2020	→ Gubbio (loan)	14	(0)
2020	→ Giana Erminio (loan)	6	(5)
2020–2023	AlbinoLeffe	107	(47)
2023–2024	Modena	30	(3)
2024–2026	Benevento	68	(19)
2026–	Casertana	1	(2)

International career
2014–2015	Italy U20	8	(5)
- * Club domestic league appearances and goals as of 22 August 2026

Jacopo Manconi (born 24 April 1994) is an Italian professional footballer who plays as a forward for Serie C Group C club Casertana.

== Biography ==
Born in Milan, Lombardy, Manconi was a player for the reserve team of Piedmontese club Novara in 2012–13 season. He was signed from Villanterio in a temporary deal on 21 August 2012. Manconi made his Serie B debut during 2013–14 Serie B. He followed the club relegated to Lega Pro in 2014. On 2 February 2015 Manconi and Gustavo Vagenin were signed by fellow third level club Lecce, with Luigi Della Rocca moved to Novara. Novara promoted back to Serie B in 2015.

Manconi wore No. 28 shirt for Novara in 2015–16 Serie B season.

On 15 July 2016, he was signed by Reggiana in a temporary deal.

On 10 July 2019, he signed a 2-year contract with Serie B club Perugia. On 21 August 2019, he was loaned to Gubbio. On 16 January 2020, he joined Giana Erminio on loan.

On 17 September 2020, he moved to AlbinoLeffe.

On 8 July 2024, Manconi signed a two-year contract with Benevento.

== Honours ==
Livorno Calcio

- Serie C: 2017–18

Individual

- Serie C – Girone A top scorer: 2020–21 (15 goals)
