= Gabriele Morelli =

Italian footballer (born 1996)

Personal information
- Date of birth: 12 December 1996 (age 29)
- Place of birth: Livorno, Italy
- Height: 1.81 m (5 ft 11 in)
- Position: Defender

Team information
- Current team: Pianese

Senior career*
Years	Team	Apps	(Gls)
2015–2021	Livorno	67	(3)
2018–2019	→ Juventus U23 (loan)	24	(0)
2021	→ Südtirol (loan)	12	(1)
2021–2022	ACR Messina	19	(2)
2022–2024	Gubbio	58	(3)
2024–2025	Campobasso	29	(1)
2025–2026	Foggia	18	(2)
2026	→ Trapani (loan)	5	(0)
2026–	Pianese	0	(0)
- * Club domestic league appearances and goals as of 1 May 2026

Gabriele Morelli (born 12 December 1996) is an Italian professional footballer who plays as a defender for Serie C Group B club Pianese.

== Career ==
On 28 January 2021, he joined Südtirol on loan until the end of the 2020–21 season.

On 4 August 2021, he signed a two-year contract with ACR Messina.

On 4 August 2022, Morelli moved to Gubbio on a two-year contract.

On 23 August 2024, Morelli joined Campobasso.

== Honours ==
Livorno

- Serie C: 2017–18 (Group A)
