= Pietro Ciotti =

Italian footballer

Personal information
- Date of birth: 31 July 1999 (age 27)
- Place of birth: Nocera Inferiore, Italy
- Height: 1.71 m (5 ft 7 in)
- Position: Right-back

Team information
- Current team: Cosenza
- Number: 45

Youth career
- –2017: Nocerina
- 2017: → Avellino (loan)

Senior career*
Years	Team	Apps	(Gls)
2016–2017	Nocerina	24	(5)
2017	Ebolitana	16	(1)
2017–2022	Vibonese	116	(2)
2022–2023	Fidelis Andria	37	(0)
2023–2024	Vibonese	31	(11)
2024–2026	Trapani	47	(3)
2026–	Cosenza	17	(1)
- * Club domestic league appearances and goals as of 1 May 2026

Pietro Ciotti (born 31 July 1999) is an Italian professional footballer who plays as a right-back for Serie C Group C club Cosenza.

== Career ==
Born in Nocera Inferiore, Ciotti started his career in Nocerina youth sector. In 2016, he was promoted to the first team on Eccellenza. He left the club in June 2017.

On 22 July 2017, he moved to Ebolitana.

For the 2017–18 season, he joined to Vibonese in Serie D.

On 27 January 2022, he signed with Fidelis Andria.

On 12 July 2024, Ciotti moved to Trapani.

On 3 January 2026, Ciotti joined Cosenza.
