= Stadio Bruno Recchioni =

Coordinates: 43°10′2″N 13°43′48″E

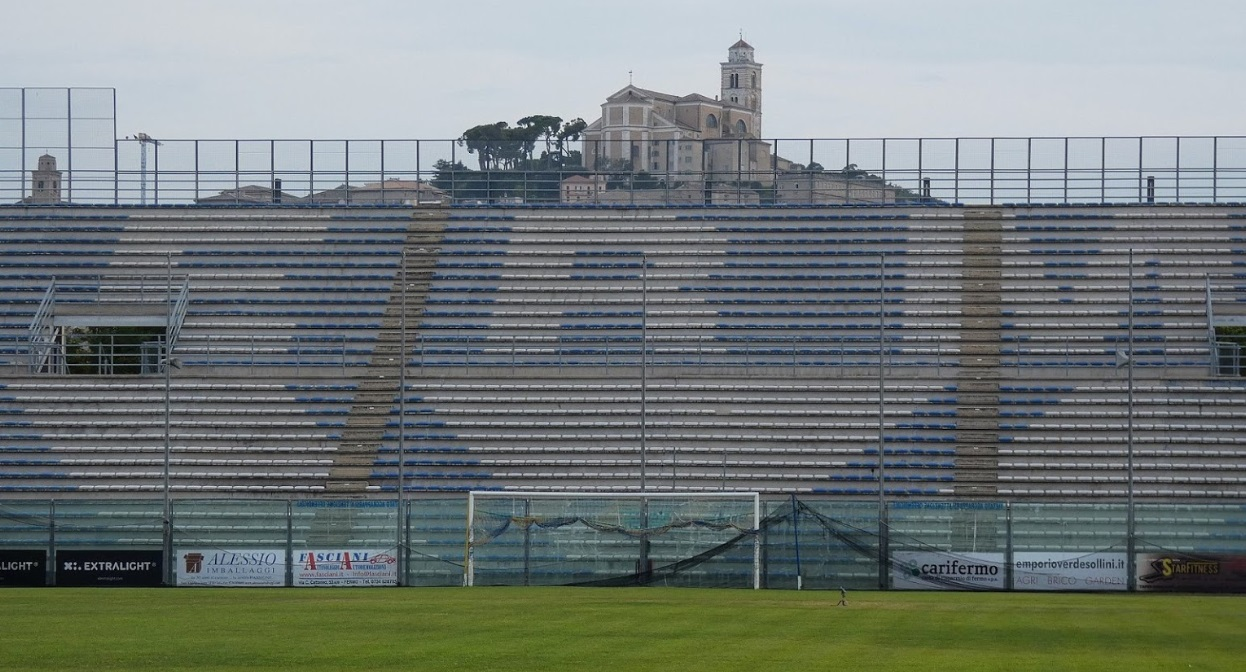
Stadio Bruno Recchioni

Stadio Bruno Recchioni is a multi-use stadium in Fermo, Italy. It is used mostly for football matches and is the home ground of Fermana FC.
