= Maguette Fall =

Senegalese footballer (born 1994)

Personal information
- Date of birth: 4 May 1994 (age 32)
- Place of birth: Senegal
- Height: 1.89 m (6 ft 2 in)
- Position: Striker

Team information
- Current team: Monopoli
- Number: 11

Senior career*
Years	Team	Apps	(Gls)
2013–2014	Bresso		(15)
2014–2016	Mariano		(33)
2016–2020	Casatese	61	(25)
2021–2022	Vis Nova Giussano	59	(25)
2022–2024	Giana Erminio	69	(35)
2024–2025	Trapani	19	(3)
2025–2026	Virtus Entella	14	(1)
2025–2026	→ Monopoli (loan)	38	(9)
2026–	Monopoli	0	(0)
- * Club domestic league appearances and goals as of 1 May 2026

Maguette Fall (born 4 May 1994) is a Senegalese footballer who plays as a striker for Italian Serie C Group C club Monopoli.

== Life and career ==
In 2013, Fall signed for Italian side Bresso. He scored fifteen league goals while playing for the club. In 2014, he signed for Italian side Mariano. He scored thirty-three league goals while playing for the club. In 2016, Fall signed for Italian side Casatese. He made sixty-one league appearances and scored twenty-five goals while playing for the club. He helped the club win the Coppa Italia Eccellenza. He also helped the club achieve promotion.

In 2021, he signed for Italian side Vis Nova Giussano. He made fifty-nine league appearances and scored twenty-five goals while playing for the club. In 2022, he signed for Italian side Giana Erminio. He helped the club achieve promotion. He made sixty-nine league appearances and scored thirty-five goals while playing for the club. On 12 July 2024, Fall signed with Trapani in Serie C.

Fall was born on 4 May 1994 in Senegal. He moved to Italy in 2006, at the age of twelve. He only started playing football after arriving in Italy, having never played the sport in Senegal. He has been nicknamed "Mago". He has been a supporter of Bundesliga side BVB. He has regarded Germany international Marco Reus as his football idol.

== Style of play ==
Fall mainly operates as a striker. He initially operated as a winger before switching to striker. He is known for his speed.
