= Giacomo Parigi =

Italian footballer (born 1996)

Personal information
- Date of birth: 18 June 1996 (age 30)
- Place of birth: Arezzo, Italy
- Height: 1.85 m (6 ft 1 in)
- Position: Forward

Team information
- Current team: Pescara
- Number: 97

Youth career
- –2014: Arezzo
- 2013–2014: → Atalanta (loan)
- 2014–2016: Atalanta

Senior career*
Years	Team	Apps	(Gls)
2012–2013	Arezzo	4	(0)
2016–2019	Atalanta	0	(0)
2016	→ Cosenza (loan)	4	(1)
2016–2017	→ Forlì (loan)	20	(0)
2017–2018	→ Akragas (loan)	18	(2)
2018	→ Virtus Francavilla (loan)	11	(0)
2018–2019	→ Paganese (loan)	36	(6)
2019–2020	Olbia	23	(3)
2020–2021	Vibonese	29	(3)
2021–2022	Campobasso	15	(0)
2022	→ Picerno (loan)	12	(5)
2022–2024	Arzignano	66	(16)
2024–2025	Rimini	36	(11)
2025–2026	Latina	35	(17)
2026–	Pescara	0	(0)
- * Club domestic league appearances and goals as of 29 August 2026

Giacomo Parigi (born 18 June 1996) is an Italian professional footballer who plays as a forward for Serie C Group B club Pescara.

== Career ==
=== Arezzo ===
Born in Arezzo, Parigi started his career in the team of the city. On 5 August 2012 he made his debut for Arezzo as a substitute replacing Filippo Borgogni in the 62nd minute of a 2–0 away defeat against Pisa in the first round of Coppa Italia. He played also 4 matches in Serie D.

=== Atalanta ===
After a season-long loan to the youth team with an option to buy Parigi joined to Atalanta in January 2013. He played in the youth team for 3 years before to join Cosenza on loan.

==== Loan to Cosenza ====
On 2 February 2016, Parigi was loaned to Serie C side Cosenza on a 6-month loan deal. On 14 February he made his Serie C debut for Cosenza as a substitute replacing Giovanni Cavallaro in the 83rd minute of a 1–1 home draw against Catanzaro. On 28 February he made his second appearances, again as a substitute, replacing Andrea Arrighini in the 87th minute of a 2–1 home win over Juve Stabia. On 2 April, Parigi scored his first professional goal, as a substitute, in the 94th minute of a 3–2 away win over Monopoli. On 30 April he played his fourth match as a substitute replacing Andrea La Mantia in the 71st minute of a 3–3 away draw against Fidelis Andria. Parigi ended his loan to Cosenza with 4 appearances, all as a substitute, and 1 goal.

==== Loan to Forlì ====
On 1 July 2016, Parigi was signed by Serie C side Forlì on a season-long loan deal. On 27 August he made his Serie C debut as a substitute replacing Federico Baschirotto in the 76th minute of a 1–0 away defeat against Venezia. On 1 October, Parigi played his first entire match for Forlì, a 5–0 away defeat against FeralpiSalò. After loss 3–1 on aggregate the play-out matches against Fano, Forli was relegated in Serie D, but Parigi was an unused substitute both times. He ended his season-long loan to Forlì with 20 appearances, only 4 as a starter.

==== Loan to Akragas and Virtus Francavilla ====
On 27 July 2017, Parigi was signed by Serie C club Akragas on a season-long loan deal. On 26 August he made his Serie C debut in a 1–0 away defeat against Matera, he was replaced by Alessio Leveque. On 3 October, Parigi played his first entire match for Akragas, a 3–1 away defeat against Catanzaro. On 7 October he scored his first goal for Akragas in the 39th minute of a 2–2 home draw against Bisceglie. On 25 November he was sent off with a red card in the 30th minute of a 2–0 away defeat against Catania. On 21 January he scored his second goal in the 47th minute of a 3–2 home defeat against Monopoli. In January 2018, Parigi was re-called to Atalanta leaving Akragas with 18 appearances, 2 goals and 1 assist.

On 26 January 2018, Parigi was loaned to Serie C club Virtus Francavilla on a 6-month loan deal. On 29 January he made his Serie C debut for Catania as a substitute replacing Giuseppe Madonia in the 62nd minute of a 1–0 away defeat against Catania. On 4 February, Parigi played his first match as a starter for Virtus Francavilla, a 0–0 home draw against Rende, he was replaced by Giuseppe Madonia in the 69th minute. Parigi ended his loan to Virtus Francavilla with 11 appearances, only 4 as a starter and 2 assists.

==== Loan to Paganese ====
On 6 August 2018, Parigi was signed by Serie C side Paganese on a season-long loan deal. On 16 September he made his Serie C debut for Paganese in a 4–1 home defeat against Rende, he was replaced by Thomas Alberti after 64 minutes. Two weeks later, on 30 September, he scored his first goal for Paganese, as a substitute, in the 93rd minute of a 3–1 home defeat against Juve Stabia. On 20 October he scored his second goal in the 38th minute of a 4–2 home defeat against Catania.

=== Olbia ===
On 22 July 2019, he signed a 3-year contract with Olbia.

=== Vibonese ===
On 11 September 2020 he joined Vibonese.

=== Campobasso ===
On 4 August 2021, Parigi joined to Campobasso.

==== Loan to Picerno ====
On 31 January 2022, he joined to Picerno on loan.

=== Arzignano ===
On 11 July 2022, he moved to Arzignano.

=== Rimini ===
On 20 July 2024, Parigi signed a two-year contract with Rimini.

== Career statistics ==
=== Club ===
As of match played 16 April 2022

Club	Season	League			National Cup		Other		Total	
Club	Season	League	Apps	Goals	Apps	Goals	Apps	Goals	Apps	Goals
Cosenza (loan)	2015–16	Serie C	4	1	0	0	—		4	1
Forlì (loan)	2016–17	Serie C	20	0	0	0	2 (Note: Appearance(s) in Coppa Italia Serie C)	0	22	0
Akragas (loan)	2017–18	Serie C	18	2	0	0	2	0	20	2
Virtus Francavilla (loan)	2017–18	Serie C	9	0	0	0	2 (Note: Appearance(s) in Serie C Playoffs)	0	11	0
Paganese (loan)	2018–19	Serie C	34	6	0	0	4 (Note: Two appearances in Serie C Playoffs, two appearances in Coppa Italia Serie C)	0	38	6
Olbia	2019–20	Serie C	23	3	0	0	2 (Note: One appearance in Serie C Playoffs, one appearance and one goal in Coppa Italia Serie C)	1	25	3
Vibonese	2020–21	Serie C	31	3	0	0	—		31	3
Campobasso	2021–22	Serie C	16	0	0	0	—		16	0
Picerno	2021–22	Serie C	12	5	0	0	—		12	5
Career total			167	20	0	0	12	1	179	20
