= AC Tuttocuoio 1957 San Miniato =

Italian football club

Tuttocuoio
- Full name: Associazione Calcio Tuttocuoio 1957 San Miniato s.r.l.
- Nickname(s): neroverdi (green-blacks) conciari (tanners)
- Founded: 1957 (as Ponte a Egola); 1959 (as Tuttocuoio)
- Ground: Leporaia, Ponte a Egola, San Miniato, Italy
- Capacity: 500
- Chairman: Paola Coia
- Manager: Francesco Tavano
- League: Serie D Girone D
- 2023–24: Eccellenza Tuscany, 1st (promoted)
Home colours	Away colours

Associazione Calcio Tuttocuoio 1957 San Miniato, commonly known as Tuttocuoio, is an Italian association football club located in Ponte a Egola, a frazione of San Miniato, Tuscany. It plays in Serie D.

== History ==
The club was founded in 1957 as U.S. Ponte a Egola. It was renamed as A.S.D. Tuttocuoio Calcio in 1959.

=== Serie D ===
The team was promoted to Serie D in the summer of 2010, after winning the Promozione Tuscany in the 2008–09 season.

The club in the season 2009–10 obtained a prestigious tripletta: winning the Coppa Italia Dilettanti 2008–09, obtaining direct promotion to Serie D, having also previously won the Regional Coppa Italia Tuscany, alongside the Eccellenza Tuscany league.

=== Lega Pro ===
In 2012–13, Tuttocuoio won the Serie D Girone A and thus ensured promotion to Lega Pro Seconda Divisione for the first time ever. As a professional club, Tuttocuoio ended its first season in tenth place and ensured a spot for the 2014–15 Lega Pro after defeating Aversa Normanna and Arzanese in the playoffs.

=== Return to amateur football ===
After being relegated back to Serie D in 2017, Tuttocuoio moved back to their original home venue in Ponte a Egola, after having played their professional seasons at the Stadio Libero Masini of neighbouring town Santa Croce sull'Arno.

In 2020, Tuttocuoio suffered another relegation, this time to Eccellenza.

== Colors and badge ==
The club colours are green and black.

== Honours ==
- Eccellenza Tuscany:
  - Winner (1): 2009–10
- Coppa Italia Dilettanti:
  - Champion (1): 2009–10
- Regional Coppa Italia Tuscany:
  - Winner (1): 2009–10
