= Stadio Domenico Francioni =

Stadium in Latina, Lazio, Italy

Coordinates: 41°27′49″N 12°53′56″E

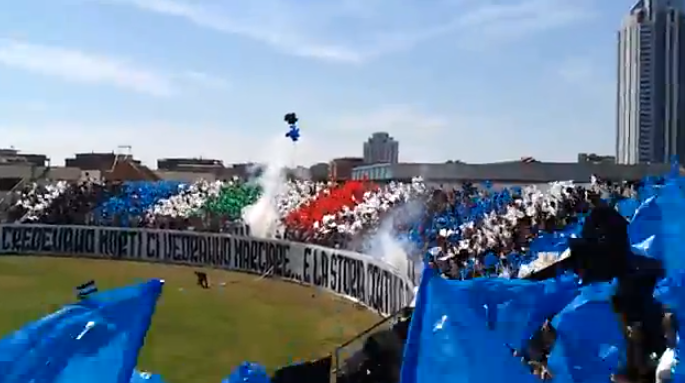
- Interactive map of Stadio Domenico Francioni
- Location: Latina, Lazio, Italy
- Owner: comunale of Latina
- Capacity: 9,398

Construction
- Opened: 1935
- Renovated: 2009

Tenant
- U.S. Latina Calcio

Stadio Domenico Francioni, is a multi-purpose stadium in Latina, Lazio, Italy. It is mainly used mostly for football matches and hosts the home matches of Latina Calcio 1932 of the Serie C. The stadium has a capacity of 9,398 spectators.
