= Guidonia Montecelio 1937 FC =

Italian football club

Guidonia Montecelio
- Full name: Guidonia Montecelio 1937; Football Club
- Founded: 2024
- Ground: Stadio Comunale, Guidonia Montecelio, Italy
- Capacity: 2,900
- Chairman: Mauro Fusano
- Manager: Ciro Ginestra
- League: Serie C Group B
- 2025–26: Serie C Group B, 15th of 20
Home colours	Away colours

Guidonia Montecelio 1937 Football Club is an Italian association football club located in Guidonia Montecelio, Lazio. The club currently plays in Serie C Group B and was founded in 2024 as a result of the relocation and change of colours and name of former professional club Monterosi Tuscia FC. The team colours are red and blue.

Guidonia saw success in their first season, first reaching the final of the Coppa Italia Serie D before losing on penalties to Ravenna FC, before winning Group G of the 2024–25 Serie D to earn promotion to the Serie C.

== Current squad ==
As of 1 September 2026

Note: Flags indicate national team as defined under FIFA eligibility rules; some limited exceptions apply. Players may hold more than one non-FIFA nationality.

No.	Pos.	Nation	Player
2	DF	ITA	Stefano Esempio
3	DF	ITA	Alessandro Malomo
4	MF	ITA	Enrico Celeghin
5	MF	ITA	Valerio Mastrantonio
7	MF	ITA	Daniel Sannipoli
8	MF	ITA	Andrea Errico
9	FW	FIN	Eetu Vertainen
10	MF	ITA	Alessandro Spavone
11	MF	ITA	Orlando Viteritti
13	DF	ITA	Erasmo Mulè
14	MF	ITA	Salvatore Santoro
17	MF	ITA	Simone Tascone
18	MF	ITA	Christian D'Urso
20	MF	ITA	Pasquale Giannotti
21	DF	ITA	Mattia Tonetto

No.	Pos.	Nation	Player
22	GK	ITA	Tommaso Ramogida
23	MF	ITA	Alessandro Murgia
25	GK	ITA	Giacomo Drago
26	DF	ITA	Riccardo Baroni
30	FW	ITA	Franco Ferrari
33	DF	ITA	Diego Borghini
38	DF	ITA	Paolo Frascatore
73	FW	ITA	Alessandro Falleni
77	DF	ITA	Davide Zappella
96	GK	ITA	Giovanni Stellato
—	DF	ITA	Michele Picardi
—	DF	ITA	Cristian Riggio
—	DF	ROU	Robert Toma
—	MF	ITA	Raffaele Marchioro

=== Out on loan ===
Note: Flags indicate national team as defined under FIFA eligibility rules; some limited exceptions apply. Players may hold more than one non-FIFA nationality.

No.	Pos.	Nation	Player
—	DF	ITA	Francesco Stefanelli (at Nocerina until 30 June 2027)
—	MF	ITA	Andrea Tessiore (at Folgore Caratese until 30 June 2027)

No.	Pos.	Nation	Player
—	FW	ITA	Daniele Iacoponi (at Trastevere until 30 June 2027)
—	FW	ITA	Diego Zuppel (at Novara until 30 June 2027)

== Honours ==
National
Competitions	Titles	Seasons
Serie D	1	2024–25
