= Monterosi Tuscia FC =

Italian football club

Monterosi
- Full name: Monterosi Tuscia Football Club S.r.l.
- Founded: 1968
- Dissolved: 2024
- Ground: Stadio Marcello Martoni; Monterosi, Italy
- Capacity: 700
- Website: monterosifc.com
Home colours	Away colours

Monterosi Tuscia Football Club, commonly known just as Monterosi, was an Italian association football club located in Monterosi, region of Lazio.

== History ==
The club was founded in 1968, competing in the lower tiers of amateur football, such as Seconda Categoria in 2004. They reached Promozione in 2007 and were first promoted to Eccellenza in 2009 through playoffs.

In 2016, when Luciano Capponi took the presidency, the club merged with Nuova Sorianese and was renamed to Nuova Monterosi, promptly winning the 2016–17 Eccellenza league, thus ensuring themselves a historical first time to Serie D the following season. In 2020, under head coach David D'Antoni, Monterosi narrowly missed on promotion to Grosseto following the 2019–20 season halt due to the COVID-19 pandemic in Italy.

In the 2020–21 Serie D season, Monterosi won the Girone H of the league, thus ensuring themselves a spot in the Serie C for the following season. Following te promotion, the club was renamed Monterosi Tuscia, in order to better represent the whole area of the city of Monterosi historically known as Tuscia. For their 2021–22 Serie C debut season, Monterosi had to move from their hometown stadium, Stadio Marcello Martoni, as its capacity of 500 was deemed incompatible with the league rules, and opted to relocate at the Stadio Enrico Rocchi in Viterbo for their home games.

In 2024, after suffering relegation from Serie C, the club relocated to Guidonia Montecelio, changed its colours to red-and-blue and was renamed Guidonia Montecelio 1937 FC, thus ending its entire association with Monterosi.

== Colors and badge ==
Its colors were red and white.

== Honours ==
- Eccellenza Lazio: 1

2016–17

- Serie D/G: 1

2020–21
