= Virtus Francavilla Calcio =

Italian football club

Virtus Francavilla
- Full name: Virtus Francavilla Calcio
- Founded: 1946
- Ground: Stadio Giovanni Paolo II, Francavilla Fontana, Italy
- Capacity: 2,137
- Chairman: Antonio Magrì
- Manager: Alberto Colombo
- League: Serie D
- 2023–24: Serie C Group C, 18th of 20 (relegated)
- Website: http://www.virtusfrancavillacalcio.it/
Home colours	Away colours

Virtus Francavilla Calcio, commonly known as Virtus Francavilla, is an Italian football club based in Francavilla Fontana, Apulia. They currently play in Serie D, the fourth tier of Italian football.

== History ==
=== The historic Francavilla Calcio ===
The historic Francavilla Calcio was founded in 1946 with the name of A.S. Francavilla, and it has always played regional leagues. In 2006 it was renamed A.S.D. Francavilla Calcio In the season 2010–11, was relegated from Serie D group H to the Eccellenza Apulia.

=== Foundation ===
The new club was founded in 2007 under the name of Salento Francavilla. It has assumed its present name after the merger at the end of the 2013–14 season with the historic Francavilla Calcio. In that year it won the Eccellenza Apulia championship coming back in Serie D.

=== From Serie D to Lega Pro ===
In the season 2014–15 the team was promoted for the first time, from Eccellenza Apulia to Serie D. At the end of the 2015–16 Serie D, the team was promoted in the 2016–17 Lega Pro. For the first time in its history, the team reached a professional league, the third highest football division of Italy.

== Colours and badge ==
The club's main colours of their badge and kit are blue and white.

== Honours ==
- Coppa Italia Dilettanti
  - Champions (1): 2014–15
