= 2026–27 Serie C =

Serie C
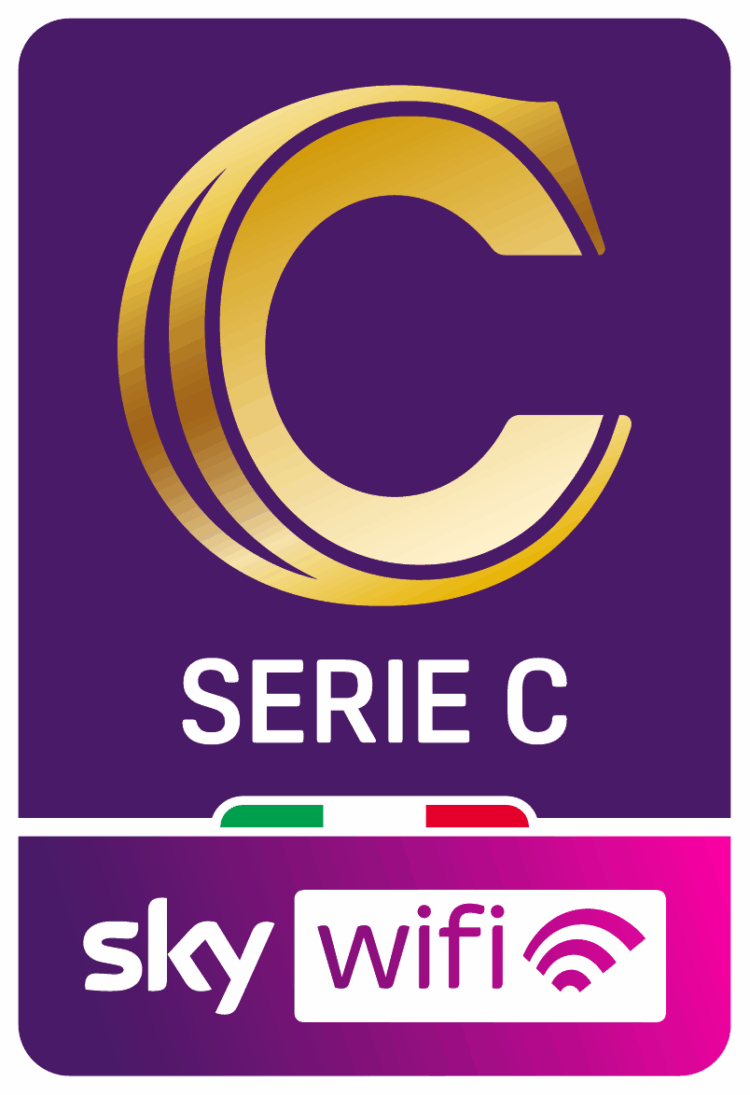
- Season: 2026–27
- Dates: Regular season: 21 August 2026 – 25 April 2027
- Top goalscorer: Leon Šipoš (7 goals)
- Biggest home win: Catania 4–0 Cosenza (7 September 2026); Audace Cerignola 4–0 Giugliano (11 September 2026); Trento 4–0 Pro Vercelli (21 September 2026)
- Biggest away win: Alcione Milano 0–4 Union Brescia (20 September 2026)
- Highest scoring: Forlì 6–3 Pescara (29 August 2026)
- Longest winning run: Cittadella (6 matches)
- Longest unbeaten run: Eight teams (6 matches)
- Longest winless run: Eight teams (6 matches)
- Longest losing run: Giana Erminio; Sambenedettese; Vis Pesaro (4 matches)
- Highest attendance: 16,948; Catania vs Inter Milan Under-23; 23 August 2026

The 2026–27 Serie C, officially known as Serie C Sky Wifi for sponsorship, is be the twelfth season of the unified Serie C division, the third tier of the Italian football league system.

== Changes ==
The league will be composed of 60 teams, geographically divided into three groups. The group composition will be decided and formalized by the Serie C league committee between July and August.

The following teams have changed divisions since the 2025–26 season:

=== To Serie C ===
Relegated from Serie B

- Bari, after 4 years of absence
- Reggiana, after 3 years of absence
- Spezia, after 14 years of absence
- Pescara, after 1 year of absence

Promoted from Serie D

- Vado (Group A winners)
- Folgore Caratese (Group B winners)
- Treviso (Group C winners)
- Desenzano (Group D winners)
- Grosseto (Group E winners)
- Ostia Mare (Group F winners)
- Scafatese (Group G winners)
- Barletta (Group H winners)
- Savoia (Group I winners)

=== From Serie C ===
Promoted to Serie B

- Vicenza (Group A winners)
- Arezzo (Group B winners)
- Benevento (Group C winners)
- Ascoli (Play-off winners)

Relegated to Serie D

- Virtus Verona
- Pro Patria
- Triestina
- Bra
- Pontedera
- Rimini (excluded)
- Foggia (successively readmitted)
- Siracusa
- Trapani

Ternana were the only club that did not submit an application to take part in the league, and were replaced by Calcio Foggia 1920.

== Group A (North) ==
=== Stadia and locations ===
11 teams from Lombardy, 4 teams from Veneto, 3 teams from Piedmont, 1 team from Emilia-Romagna and 1 team from Trentino-Alto Adige/Südtirol.

Location of teams in 2026–27 Serie C (Group A)
Location of teams in 2026–27 Serie C (Group A) (Lombardy)

Club	City	Stadium	Capacity
AlbinoLeffe	Albino and Leffe	AlbinoLeffe Stadium (Zanica)	1,791
Alcione Milano	Milan	Ernesto Breda (Sesto San Giovanni)	3,523
Arzignano Valchiampo	Arzignano	Tommaso Dal Molin	1,690
Carpi	Carpi	Sandro Cabassi	5,510
Cittadella	Cittadella	Piercesare Tombolato	7,623
Desenzano	Desenzano del Garda	Comunale Gino Corioni (Ospitaletto)	9,000
Dolomiti Bellunesi	Belluno, Feltre and Sedico	Zugni Tauro (Feltre)	1,700
Folgore Caratese	Carate Brianza	XXV Aprile	1,450
Giana Erminio	Gorgonzola	Città di Gorgonzola	3,766
Juventus Next Gen	Turin	Giuseppe Moccagatta (Alessandria)	5,827
Lecco	Lecco	Rigamonti-Ceppi	5,508
Lumezzane	Lumezzane	Tullio Saleri	4,150
Novara	Novara	Silvio Piola (Novara)	17,875
Ospitaletto	Ospitaletto	Comunale Gino Corioni	9,000
Pergolettese	Crema	Giuseppe Voltini	4,095
Pro Vercelli	Vercelli	Silvio Piola (Vercelli)	5,526
Renate	Renate	XXV Aprile (Carate Brianza)	1,450
Trento	Trento	Briamasco	3,000
Treviso	Treviso	Omobono Tenni	10,000
Union Brescia	Brescia	Mario Rigamonti	19,550

=== Personnel and sponsors ===
Club	Manager	Captain	Kit maker	Shirt sponsor(s)
Club	Manager	Captain	Kit maker	Main
AlbinoLeffe	(Italy) Marco Zaffaroni	(Italy) Simone Potop	Acerbis	Isocell
Alcione Milano	(Italy) Giovanni Cusatis	(Italy) Giorgio Galli	Adidas	Banca del Fucino
Arzignano Valchiampo	(Italy) Daniele Di Donato	(Albania) Erald Lakti	Jako	C.G.R.D. Chemicals
Carpi	(Italy) Stefano Cassani	(Italy) Davide Zagnoni	Macron	Texcart Fifty Nine
Cittadella	(Italy) Roberto Musso	(Italy) Francesco Amatucci	Erreà	Sirmax
Desenzano	(Italy) Marco Gaburro	(Italy) Francesco Antonelli	Jako	WTO Servizi Ambientali
Dolomiti Bellunesi	(Italy) Andrea Bonatti	(Italy) Thomas Cossalter	Adidas	Sportful
Folgore Caratese	(Italy) Federico Guidi	(Italy) Fabio Castellano	Nike	Sportitalia
Giana Erminio	(Italy) Mario Tacchinardi	(Italy) Daniele Pinto	Macron	Bamonte
Juventus Next Gen	(Italy) Massimo Brambilla	(Italy) Simone Guerra	Adidas	Jeep
Lecco	(Italy) Federico Valente	(Italy) Stefano Bonaiti	Legea	Cantine Pirovano
Lumezzane	(Italy) Paolo Sammarco	(Italy) Stefano Filigheddu	Acerbis	Camozzi
Novara	(Italy) Manuel Iori	(Italy) Roberto Ranieri	Erreà	Igor Gorgonzola
Ospitaletto	(Italy) Andrea Quaresmini	(Italy) Michel Panatti	Acerbis	Nova Sider Forgital
Pergolettese	(Italy) Antonio Giosa	(Italy) Mariano Arini	Joma	Mondo Immagine Travel
Pro Vercelli	(Italy) Daniele Bonera	(Italy) Gianmario Comi	Fourteen	None
Renate	(Italy) Simone Banchieri	(Italy) Simone Auriletto	Kappa	Yale Lift Truck Technologies (H) / Carer Lifting Solutions (A)
Trento	(Italy) Luca Tabbiani	(Italy) Andrea Trainotti	Acerbis	Trentino
Treviso	(Italy) Edoardo Gorini	(Austria) Robert Gucher	Erreà	CentroMarca Banca
Union Brescia	(Italy) Eugenio Corini	(Italy) Davide Balestrero	In-house	A2A

=== Table ===
2026–27 Serie C, Group A
Pos	Team	Pld	W	D	L	GF	GA	GD	Pts	Promotion or relegation
1	Cittadella	11	9	0	2	18	6	+12	27	Promotion to Serie B and qualification for Supercoppa di Serie C
2	Trento	11	6	5	0	17	6	+11	23	Qualification for the national play-offs second round
3	Union Brescia	11	6	4	1	19	9	+10	22	Qualification for the national play-offs first round
4	Arzignano	11	6	2	3	16	11	+5	20	Qualification for the group play-offs second round
5	Treviso	11	5	4	2	12	8	+4	19	Qualification for the group play-offs first round
6	Ospitaletto	11	5	3	3	18	11	+7	18	Qualification for the group play-offs first round
7	Pergolettese	11	4	5	2	10	9	+1	17	Qualification for the group play-offs first round
8	Alcione Milano	11	3	6	2	18	17	+1	15	Qualification for the group play-offs first round
9	Lecco	11	3	5	3	14	11	+3	14	Qualification for the group play-offs first round
10	AlbinoLeffe	11	3	5	3	16	15	+1	14	Qualification for the group play-offs first round
11	Desenzano	11	3	4	4	10	13	−3	13	
12	Lumezzane	11	3	3	5	12	16	−4	12	
13	Carpi	11	3	3	5	16	21	−5	12	
14	Pro Vercelli	11	3	3	5	10	19	−9	12	
15	Giana Erminio	11	2	5	4	12	14	−2	11	
16	Novara	11	2	4	5	10	16	−6	10	Qualification for the relegation play-outs
17	Dolomiti Bellunesi	11	2	4	5	8	14	−6	10	Qualification for the relegation play-outs
18	Juventus Next Gen	11	2	4	5	11	18	−7	10	Qualification for the relegation play-outs
19	Folgore Caratese	11	1	4	6	11	17	−6	7	Qualification for the relegation play-outs
20	Renate	11	0	5	6	9	16	−7	5	Relegation to Serie D

Updated to match(es) played on 29 October 2026. Source: Lega Pro
Rules for classification: 1) Points; 2) Head-to-head points; 3) Head-to-head goal difference; 4) Goal difference; 5) Goals scored; 6) Lower goals against; 7) Wins; 8) Lower losses; 9) Away wins; 10) Lower home losses.
(Note: Head-to-head record is used only after all the matches between the teams in question have been played)

== Group B (Centre) ==
=== Stadia and locations ===
3 teams from Emilia-Romagna, 3 teams from Lazio, 3 teams from Tuscany, 2 teams from Abruzzo, 2 teams from Liguria, 2 teams from Marche, 2 teams from Umbria, 1 team from Lombardy, 1 team from Molise and 1 team from Sardinia.

Location of teams in 2026–27 Serie C (Group B)

Club	City	Stadium	Capacity
Atalanta U23	Bergamo	Comunale di Caravaggio (Caravaggio)	2,180
Campobasso	Campobasso	Antonio Molinari	25,000
Forlì	Forlì	Tullo Morgagni	3,500
Grosseto	Grosseto	Carlo Zecchini	9,779
Gubbio	Gubbio	Pietro Barbetti	4,939
Guidonia Montecelio	Guidonia Montecelio	Comunale di Guidonia Montecelio	2,900
Latina	Latina	Domenico Francioni	9,310
Livorno	Livorno	Armando Picchi	14,312
Ostia Mare	Ostia, Rome	Pasquale Giannattasio	1,500
Pescara	Pescara	Stadio Adriatico – Giovanni Cornacchia	20,476
Perugia	Perugia	Renato Curi	23,625
Pianese	Piancastagnaio	Comunale di Piancastagnaio	1,500
Pineto	Pineto	Pavone-Mariani	1,500
Ravenna	Ravenna	Bruno Benelli	12,020
Reggiana	Reggio Emilia	MAPEI Stadium - Città del Tricolore	21,525
Sambenedettese	San Benedetto del Tronto	Riviera delle Palme	13,786
Spezia	La Spezia	Stadio Alberto Picco	12,273
Torres	Sassari	Vanni Sanna	6,145
Vado	Vado Ligure	Giuseppe Sivori (Sestri Levante)	1,500
Vis Pesaro	Pesaro	Tonino Benelli	4,898

=== Personnel and sponsoring ===
Club	Manager	Captain	Kit maker	Shirt sponsor(s)
Club	Manager	Captain	Kit maker	Main
Atalanta U23	(Italy) Nicola Beati	(Italy) Davide Ghislandi	New Balance	TAO Ambiente
Campobasso	(Italy) Devis Mangia	(Italy) Alfredo Bifulco	Nike	Levigas
Forlì	(Italy) Nicola Campedelli	(Italy) Riccardo Gaiola	Ready Sport	Italposa
Grosseto	(Italy) Paolo Indiani	(Italy) Duccio Brenna	Erreà	Lamioni Holding
Gubbio	(Italy) Domenico Di Carlo	(Italy) Andrea Signorini	Legea	Cementerie Aldo Barbetti
Guidonia Montecelio	(Italy) Ciro Ginestra	(Italy) Stefano Esempio	Givova	Magazzini Maury's
Latina	(Italy) Gennaro Volpe	(Italy) Filippo Marenco	Ezeta	Gruppo MAG
Livorno	(Italy) Cristiano Lucarelli	(Italy) Tommaso Arrigoni	Magma	Aromolio
Ostia Mare	(Italy) David D'Antoni	(Italy) Danilo Piroli	Macron	Bancomat
Pescara	(Italy) Antonio Buscè	(Italy) Filippo Pellacani	Erreà	Buiva Srl
Perugia	(Italy) Aimo Diana	(Italy) Davide Riccardi	Joma	Central Energy Luce e Gas
Pianese	(Italy) Andrea Zanchetta	(Italy) Francesco Proietto	Mizuno	Stosa Cucine
Pineto	(Italy) Enrico Barilari	(Italy) Alessandro Tonti	Erreà	Liofilchem
Ravenna	(Italy) Andrea Mandorlini	(Italy) Adriano Esposito	Nike	Cipriani
Reggiana	(Italy) Attilio Tesser	(Italy) Paolo Rozzio	Macron	Immergas
Sambenedettese	(Italy) Roberto Boscaglia	(Italy) Kevin Candellori	Kappa	Giudici & Polidori
Spezia	(Italy) Marco Turati	(Italy) Simone Mazzocchi	Kappa	SegnoVerde
Torres	(Italy) Alfonso Greco	(Italy) Giuseppe Mastinu	Footure Lab	Sardegna
Vado	(Italy) Giancarlo Riolfo	(Italy) Diego Vita	Nike	Adamant Group
Vis Pesaro	(Italy) Andrea Gennari	(Italy) Manuel Di Paola	Macron	Edilsir

=== Table ===
2026–27 Serie C, Group B
Pos	Team	Pld	W	D	L	GF	GA	GD	Pts	Promotion or relegation
1	Spezia	11	9	2	0	19	5	+14	29	Promotion to Serie B and qualification for Supercoppa di Serie C
2	Ravenna	11	7	2	2	20	6	+14	23	Qualification for the national play-offs second round
3	Grosseto	11	6	4	1	23	13	+10	22	Qualification for the national play-offs first round
4	Pescara	11	5	3	3	15	13	+2	18	Qualification for the group play-offs second round
5	Torres	11	5	3	3	13	12	+1	18	Qualification for the group play-offs first round
6	Reggiana	11	5	2	4	14	11	+3	17	Qualification for the group play-offs first round
7	Guidonia Montecelio	11	4	4	3	14	12	+2	16	Qualification for the group play-offs first round
8	Livorno	11	4	4	3	16	16	0	16	Qualification for the group play-offs first round
9	Perugia	11	5	1	5	15	17	−2	16	Qualification for the group play-offs first round
10	Vado	11	4	3	4	12	11	+1	15	Qualification for the group play-offs first round
11	Atalanta U23	11	5	0	6	13	16	−3	15	
12	Campobasso	11	4	3	4	16	20	−4	15	
13	Latina	11	3	5	3	11	11	0	14	
14	Pineto	11	3	5	3	9	11	−2	14	
15	Forlì	11	2	6	3	16	16	0	12	
16	Sambenedettese	11	2	4	5	16	18	−2	10	Qualification for the relegation play-outs
17	Ostia Mare	11	2	3	6	10	14	−4	9	Qualification for the relegation play-outs
18	Pianese	11	1	6	4	6	10	−4	9	Qualification for the relegation play-outs
19	Gubbio	11	2	1	8	10	21	−11	7	Qualification for the relegation play-outs
20	Vis Pesaro	11	1	1	9	11	26	−15	4	Relegation to Serie D

Updated to match(es) played on 29 October 2026. Source: Lega Pro
Rules for classification: 1) Points; 2) Head-to-head points; 3) Head-to-head goal difference; 4) Goal difference; 5) Goals scored; 6) Lower goals against; 7) Wins; 8) Lower losses; 9) Away wins; 10) Lower home losses.
(Note: Head-to-head record is used only after all the matches between the teams in question have been played)

== Group C (South) ==
=== Stadia and locations ===
7 teams from Apulia, 7 teams from Campania, 2 teams from Basilicata, 2 teams from Calabria, 1 team from Lombardy and 1 team from Sicily.

Location of teams in 2026–27 Serie C (Group C)
Location of teams in 2026–27 Serie C (Group C) (Apulia)
Location of teams in 2026–27 Serie C (Group C) (Campania and Basilicata)

Club	City	Stadium	Capacity
Altamura	Altamura	Antonio D'Angelo	2,800
Audace Cerignola	Cerignola	Domenico Monterisi	7,453
Bari	Bari	San Nicola	58,270
Barletta	Barletta	Cosimo Puttilli	10,000
Casarano	Casarano	Giuseppe Capozza	6,500
Casertana	Caserta	Alberto Pinto	12,000
Catania	Catania	Angelo Massimino	20,881
Cavese	Cava de' Tirreni	Simonetta Lamberti	5,200
Cosenza	Cosenza	San Vito-Gigi Marulla	20,987
Crotone	Crotone	Ezio Scida	16,640
Foggia	Foggia	Pino Zaccheria	25,085
Giugliano	Giugliano in Campania	Alberto De Cristofaro	6,030
Inter Milan U23	Milan	Ernesto Breda (Sesto San Giovanni)	3,523
Monopoli	Monopoli	Vito Simone Veneziani	6,880
Picerno	Picerno	Donato Curcio	1,600
Potenza	Potenza	Alfredo Viviani	4,977
Salernitana	Salerno	Stadio Arechi	20,194
Savoia	Torre Annunziata	Alfredo Giraud	10,750
Scafatese	Scafati	Giovanni Vitiello	2,650
Sorrento	Sorrento	Italia	3,600

=== Personnel and sponsoring ===
Club	Manager	Captain	Kit maker	Shirt sponsor(s)
Club	Manager	Captain	Kit maker	Main
Altamura	(Albania) Ledian Memushaj	(Italy) Nicola Dipinto	Erreà	Banca Popolare di Puglia e Basilicata
Audace Cerignola	(Italy) Raimondo Catalano	(Italy) Luca Martinelli	Adidas	Proshop (H) / Ecodaunia (A)
Bari	(Italy) Massimo Rastelli	(Italy) Valerio Mantovani	Erreà	Betsson.sport
Barletta	(Italy) Massimo Paci	(Italy) Marco Manetta	Givova	Coop Alleanza 3.0
Casarano	(Italy) Vito Di Bari	(Italy) Raffaele Maiello	Macron	Leo Shoes
Casertana	(Dominican Republic) Vinicio Espinal	(Italy) Victor De Lucia	Decathlon	None
Catania	(Italy) Emilio Longo	(Italy) Emanuele Cicerelli	Erreà	SuperConveniente
Cavese	(Italy) Cristiano Masitto	(Italy) Giuseppe Fella	Magma	None
Cosenza	(Italy) Federico Coppitelli	(Italy) Paolo Dametto	Adidas	None
Crotone	(Italy) Leandro Greco	(Italy) Davide Merelli	EYE Sport	Salumi San Vincenzo
Foggia	(Italy) Gaetano Auteri	(Italy) Davide Di Pasquale	Nike	Euronics
Giugliano	(Italy) Lello Di Napoli	(Italy) Roberto De Rosa	Legea	Renato Mazzamauro & C.
Inter Milan U23	(Italy) Stefano Vecchi	(Italy) Giuseppe Prestia	Nike	Betsson.sport
Monopoli	(Italy) Alberto Colombo	(Italy) Cristian Battocchio	Joma	FAGI Srl
Picerno	(Italy) Claudio De Luca	(Italy) Emmanuele Esposito	Givova	Delle Rose Ricevimenti
Potenza	(Italy) Ivan Tisci	(Italy) Jacopo Murano	Adidas	Cargo Trasporto e Distribuzione di Energia
Salernitana	(Italy) Serse Cosmi	(Italy) Mattia Tascone	Givova	Opel Gruppo Noviello
Savoia	(Italy) Alessandro Formisano	(Italy) Mario Noce	Nike	None
Scafatese	(Italy) Michele Facciolo	(Italy) Errico Altobello	Givova	La Regina di San Marzano
Sorrento	(Italy) Vincenzo Maiuri	(Italy) Marco Cuccurullo	Zeus	Mediterranean Shipping Company

=== Table ===
2026–27 Serie C, Group C
Pos	Team	Pld	W	D	L	GF	GA	GD	Pts	Promotion or relegation
1	Potenza	11	8	2	1	28	15	+13	26	Promotion to Serie B and qualification for Supercoppa di Serie C
2	Bari	11	6	3	2	14	7	+7	21	Qualification for the national play-offs second round
3	Sorrento	11	6	2	3	15	11	+4	20	Qualification for the national play-offs first round
4	Catania	11	6	1	4	24	12	+12	19	Qualification for the group play-offs second round
5	Monopoli	11	5	3	3	13	9	+4	18	Qualification for the group play-offs first round
6	Audace Cerignola	11	5	2	4	18	11	+7	17	Qualification for the group play-offs first round
7	Inter Milan U23	11	5	2	4	21	19	+2	17	Qualification for the group play-offs first round
8	Scafatese	11	4	5	2	17	15	+2	17	Qualification for the group play-offs first round
9	Casertana	11	4	5	2	16	14	+2	17	Qualification for the group play-offs first round
10	Picerno	11	5	0	6	20	18	+2	15	Qualification for the group play-offs first round
11	Cavese	11	4	3	4	20	18	+2	15	
12	Salernitana	11	3	5	3	14	15	−1	14	
13	Foggia	11	4	2	5	11	13	−2	14	
14	Casarano	11	4	2	5	13	18	−5	14	
15	Altamura	11	3	3	5	9	16	−7	12	
16	Barletta	11	2	5	4	13	16	−3	11	Qualification for the relegation play-outs
17	Savoia	11	2	5	4	12	17	−5	11	Qualification for the relegation play-outs
18	Giugliano	11	3	1	7	15	29	−14	10	Qualification for the relegation play-outs
19	Cosenza	11	1	3	7	9	23	−14	6	Qualification for the relegation play-outs
20	Crotone (Note: Crotone were deducted 6 points due to administrative irregularities.)	11	1	4	6	10	16	−6	1	Relegation to Serie D

Updated to match(es) played on 29 October 2026. Source: Lega Pro
Rules for classification: 1) Points; 2) Head-to-head points; 3) Head-to-head goal difference; 4) Goal difference; 5) Goals scored; 6) Lower goals against; 7) Wins; 8) Lower losses; 9) Away wins; 10) Lower home losses.
(Note: Head-to-head record is used only after all the matches between the teams in question have been played)
