= Timeline of Trento =

The following is a timeline of the history of the city of Trento in the Trentino-South Tyrol region of Italy.

== Prior to 19th century ==
- 49 BCE – Trento granted Roman citizenship.
- 2nd–4th C. CE – Roman Catholic diocese of Trento established.
- 387 CE – Vigilius of Trent becomes bishop.
- 5th C. – Ostrogoths in power.
- 569 – Trento becomes "seat of the Lombard dukes."
- 774 – Franks in power.
- 1027 – Bishopric of Trent established.
- 1145 – Trento Cathedral consecrated.
- 1207 – Federico Wanga becomes bishop.
- 1212 – Cathedral of San Vigilio construction begins.
- 1250 – Buonconsiglio Castle construction begins.
- 1475 – Printing press in operation.
- 1487 – Venetian attacks ended.
- 16th c. – Palazzo delle Albere built.
- 1514
  - Bernardo Clesio becomes bishop.
  - Santa Maria Maggiore church construction begins.
- 1515 – Palazzo Salvadori building begins.
- 1545 – Religious Council of Trent begins.
- 1563 – Council of Trent ends.
- 1602 – Palazzo Galasso built.
- 1761 – Accademia Trentina active.^{(it)}
- 1743 – Trento Cathedral building completed.
- 1768 – Fountain of Neptune (Trento) installed.
- 1795 – Società Filarmonica di Trento founded.^{(it)}

== 19th century ==
- 1803 – Trento becomes part of Austria.
- 1810 – Trento becomes seat of the Department of Alto Adige of the Napoleonic Kingdom of Italy.
- 1814 – Trento becomes part of the Austrian Habsburg Empire again.
- 1819 – Teatro Mazzurana opens.
- 1827 – Cimitero monumentale di Trento (cemetery) established.
- 1846 – Museo tridentino di scienze naturali (museum) opens.
- 1848 – Invasion of Trentino (1848).
- 1856 – Biblioteca comunale di Trento (library) established.
- 1857 – Population: 14,347.
- 1859 – Brenner Railway (Verona-Trento) begins operating & Trento railway station opens.
- 1872 – Società degli Alpinisti Tridentini (hiking club) founded.
- 1880 – Population: 19,585.
- 1896 – Dante monument (Trento) erected.
- 1900 – Population: 24,868.

== 20th century ==
- 1909 – Trento–Malè–Marilleva railway begins operating.
- 1910
  - Trento–Venice railway in operation.
  - Population: 30,049.
- 1918 – Trento becomes part of Italy.
- 1919 – Società per gli Studî Trentini founded.
- 1921 – A.C. Trento S.C.S.D. (football club) formed.
- 1922 – Stadio Briamasco (stadium) opens.
- 1923 – Circondario di Trento (administrative region) established.
- 1925 – Sardagna aerial tram begins operating.
- 1931 – Population: 38,176.
- 1935 – Mausoleo di Cesare Battisti built on nearby Doss Trento.
- 1936 – Trento railway station rebuilt.
- 1938 – Giardino Botanico Alpino alle Viotte di Monte Bondone (garden) established near Trento.
- 1943 – 2 September: Aerial bombing of Trento by Allied forces during World War II.
- 1945 – l'Adige newspaper begins publication.
- 1947 – Trentino-Alto Adige/Südtirol autonomous region established.
- 1952 – Trento Film Festival begins.
- 1962 – Istituto universitario superiore di Scienze Sociali established.
- 1966 – Student unrest.
- 1986 – Accademia degli Accesi active.^{(it)}
- 1988 – Trentino Tyrolean Autonomist Party formed.
- 1990 – Lorenzo Dellai becomes mayor.
- 1998 – Alberto Pacher becomes mayor.

== 21st century ==
- 2008
  - September: Alessandro Andreatta becomes mayor.
  - 26 October: Trentino-Alto Adige/Südtirol provincial elections, 2008 held.
- 2013 – Population: 115,540.
- 2020 – Franco Ianeselli becomes mayor.

== See also ==
- Trento history (it, de)
- List of podestà of Trento, 1810–1945
- List of mayors of Trento, 1945–present
- List of bishops of Trento
- Other names of Trento
- History of Trentino province

Timelines of other cities in the macroregion of Northeast Italy:^{(it)}

- Emilia-Romagna region: Timeline of Bologna; Ferrara; Forlì; Modena; Parma; Piacenza; Ravenna; Reggio Emilia; Rimini
- Friuli-Venezia Giulia region: Timeline of Trieste
- Veneto region: Timeline of Padua; Treviso; Venice; Verona; Vicenza

== Bibliography ==
=== in English ===
- Abraham Rees (1819), "Trent", The Cyclopaedia, London: Longman, Hurst, Rees, Orme & Brown
- William Smith, ed. (1872) [1854]. "Tridentum". Dictionary of Greek and Roman Geography. London: John Murray. hdl:2027/hvd.ah5cur.
- David Kay (1880), "Principal Towns: Trent", Austria-Hungary, Foreign Countries and British Colonies, London: Sampson Low, Marston, Searle, & Rivington, hdl:2027/mdp.39015030647005
- T. Francis Bumpus (1900), "Trent", Cathedrals and Churches of Northern Italy, London: Laurie
- "Trent". Chambers's Encyclopaedia. London. 1901. hdl:2027/njp.32101065312959.
- Aaron Tänzer (1907), "Trent", Jewish Encyclopedia, vol. 12, New York, hdl:2027/mdp.49015002282441
- Coolidge, William Augustus Brevoort (1910). "Trent (city)" . Encyclopædia Britannica. Vol. 27 (11th ed.). p. 247.
- Benjamin Vincent (1910), "Trent", Haydn's Dictionary of Dates (25th ed.), London: Ward, Lock & Co., hdl:2027/uc2.ark:/13960/t41r6xh8t
- "Trent", Austria-Hungary (11th ed.), Leipzig: Karl Baedeker, 1911, pp. 218–220
- Christopher Kleinhenz, ed. (2004). "Trento". Medieval Italy: an Encyclopedia. Routledge. ISBN 0415939291.

=== in Italian ===
- Francesco Vigilio Barbacovi. Memorie storiche della città e del territorio di Trento, 1821–1824
- Agostino Perini (1852). Statistica del Trentino. Trento.
- Lamberto Cesarini Sforza. Piazze e strade di Trento, 1896
- "Trento". Le Tre Venézie. Guida d'Italia (in Italian). Milan: Touring Club Italiano. 1920. p. 375+ – via HathiTrust.
- G. Ciccolini (1923). "Rassegna degli studi storici trentini nell'ultimo decennio". Studi Trentini. 4.
- "Trento", Enciclopedia Italiana (Treccani) (in Italian), 1937
- Pina Pedron and Nicoletta Pontalti. Uomini e donne in guerra: Trentino, 1940–1945 (Trento: Museo Storico in Trento, 2001)

=== in German ===
- Leopold Kastner, ed. (1867). "Trient". Handels- und Gewerbe-Adressbuch des österreichischen Kaiserstaates. Vienna: Beck’sche Universitätsbuchhandlung.
- "Trient". Brockhaus' Konversations-Lexikon (in German). Vol. 15 (14th ed.). Leipzig: Brockhaus. 1896. hdl:2027/njp.32101064064528.
