= Carmine Parlato =

Italian footballer and manager (born 1970)

Personal information
- Full name: Carmine Parlato
- Date of birth: 7 June 1970 (age 56)
- Place of birth: Naples, Italy
- Height: 1.83 m (6 ft 0 in)

Team information
- Current team: Ars et Labor (head coach)

Senior career*
Years	Team	Apps	(Gls)
1987–1988	Campobasso	0	(0)
1988–1990	Latina	42	(2)
1990–1991	Padova	5	(1)
1991–1992	Baracca Lugo	14	(1)
1992–1994	Avellino	44	(0)
1994–1995	Nocerina	6	(0)
1995–1996	Catanzaro	12	(1)
1996–2000	Viterbese	113	(5)
2000–2001	Mantova	33	(0)
2001–2002	Grosseto	11	(0)
2002–2004	Rovigo	65	(8)
2004–2005	Val di Sangro	8	(1)

Managerial career
- 2005–2007: Rovigo
- 2007–2008: Valenzana
- 2008–2011: Rovigo
- 2011–2013: Sacilese
- 2013–2014: Pordenone
- 2014–2015: Padova
- 2016–2017: Delta Rovigo
- 2017–2018: Rieti
- 2018: Latina
- 2019–2020: Savoia
- 2020–2022: Trento
- 2022: Casertana
- 2022–2023: Cjarlins Muzane
- 2023–2024: Folgore Caratese
- 2024–25: Piacenza
- 2025-2025: Sarnese
- 2026: Ars et Labor
- * Club domestic league appearances and goals

Carmine Parlato (born 7 June 1970) is an Italian football manager and former player. He is the head coach of club Ars et Labor.

== Career ==
=== Playing career ===
He has played in Serie B with Padova in the season 1990-1991.

=== Coaching career ===
Parlato has won three times in the Serie D with Rovigo, Pordenone and Padova. With the Pordenone was also awarded the title of Champion of Italian amateurs.

On 27 September 2016, he was named to coach the Delta Rovigo. At the end of the season, it was not reconfirmed.

On 8 August 2017, he was named to coach Rieti, earning the team a promotion to Serie C.

In June 2018 he was named to coach Latina. In November of the same year, he left the team.

On 17 June 2019, Parlato was appointed manager of Savoia.

Parlato served as head coach of Serie D club Trento for the 2020–21 season, during which he guided his team to being crowned Girone C champions and winning promotion to Serie C for the first time in 18 years. He successively guided Trento for most of the club's 2021–22 Serie C campaign, before being sacked on 27 March 2022 following a string of negative results.

In July 2022, Parlato returned into management as the new head coach of Serie D club Casertana. On 1 November 2022, Parlato was dismissed due to negative results. Just a few days later, on 10 November, he was signed by Serie D club Cjarlins Muzane. On 13 November 2023, Parlato was however sacked due to poor results.

A few days later, on 21 November, Parlato was hired by fellow Serie D club Folgore Caratese as their new head coach on a permanent basis. He left Folgore Caratese by the end of the season.

On 8 October 2024, Parlato was hired as the new head coach of Serie D fallen giants Piacenza.

== Honours ==
=== Coach ===
Trento

- Serie D: 2020–21 (Group C)
