= List of Serie A clubs =

Italian football league clubs

The following is a list of clubs who have played in the Serie A since its formation in 1929.

Over that span, 68 teams representing 62 cities have taken part in 94 Serie A championships, played from the 1929–30 season until the 2025–26 season. Milan, Turin, Genoa, Rome and Verona are the five cities that hosted derbies. Internazionale is the only team that has played Serie A football in every season.

== List of clubs ==
The list of clubs of the Serie A from its inception to the present season, sorted by the number of seasons a club played in the league. The teams in bold compete in Serie A currently.

As of 2026–27 season (95 seasons total).

Club	Sea- sons	Cons. seas.	First season	Last season	Best result	Titles	Seasons of best result	Curr. level
**Inter Milan**	95	95	1929–30	Present	1st	19	19 seasons (Note: Seasons Inter Milan finished 1st: 1929–30, 1937–38, 1939–40, 1952–53, 1953–54, 1962–63, 1964–65, 1965–66, 1970–71, 1979–80, 1988–89, 2005–06, 2006–07, 2007–08, 2008–09, 2009–10, 2020–21, 2023–24, 2025–26)	I
**Juventus**	94	20	1929–30	Present	1st	34 (Note: Juventus' 2004–05 title was vacated due to the Calciopoli scandal.)	35 seasons (Note: Seasons Juventus finished 1st: 1930–31, 1931–32, 1932–33, 1933–34, 1934–35, 1949–50, 1951–52, 1957–58, 1959–60, 1960–61, 1966–67, 1971–72, 1972–73, 1974–75, 1976–77, 1977–78, 1980–81, 1981–82, 1983–84, 1985–86, 1994–95, 1996–97, 1997–98, 2001–02, 2002–03, 2004–05, 2011–12, 2012–13, 2013–14, 2014–15, 2015–16, 2016–17, 2017–18, 2018–19, 2019–20)	I
**Roma**	94	75	1929–30	Present	1st	3	1941–42, 1982–83, 2000–01	I
**Milan**	93	44	1929–30	Present	1st	16	16 seasons (Note: Seasons Milan finished 1st: 1950–51, 1954–55, 1956–57, 1958–59, 1961–62, 1967–68, 1978–79, 1987–88, 1991–92, 1992–93, 1993–94, 1995–96, 1998–99, 2003–04, 2010–11, 2021–22)	I
**Fiorentina**	89	23	1931–32	Present	1st	2	1955–56, 1968–69	I
**Lazio**	84	39	1929–30	Present	1st	2	1973–74, 1999–2000	I
**Torino**	83	15	1929–30	Present	1st	5	1942–43, 1946–47, 1947–48, 1948–49, 1975–76	I
**Napoli**	81	20	1929–30	Present	1st	3	1986–87, 1989–90, 2022–23	I
**Bologna**	80	12	1929–30	Present	1st	5	1935–36, 1936–37, 1938–39, 1940–41, 1963–64	I
Sampdoria	66	–	1946–47	2022–23	1st	1	1990–91	II
**Atalanta**	66	16	1937–38	Present	3rd	—	2018–19, 2019–20, 2020–21	I
**Genoa**	59	4	1929–30	Present	2nd	—	1929–30	I
**Udinese**	54	32	1950–51	Present	2nd	—	1954–55	I
**Cagliari**	46	4	1964–65	Present	1st	1	1969–70	I
Hellas Verona	35	–	1957–58	2025–26	1st	1	1984–85	II
Bari	30	–	1931–32	2010–11	7th	—	1946–47	III
Vicenza	30	–	1942–43	2000–01	2nd	—	1977–78	II
Palermo	29	–	1932–33	2016–17	5th	—	2005–06, 2006–07, 2009–10	II
**Parma**	30	3	1990–91	Present	2nd	—	1996–97	I
Triestina	26	–	1929–30	1958–59	4th	—	1947–48	IV
Brescia (Note: Club became defunct, but was re-founded as Union Brescia after the relocation of Feralpisalò.)	23	–	1929–30	2019–20	8th	—	2000–01	III
**Lecce**	21	5	1985–86	Present	9th	—	1988–89	I
SPAL (Note: Club became defunct, but was re-founded as Ars et Labor Ferrara.)	19	–	1951–52	2019–20	7th	—	1959–60	V
Livorno	18	–	1929–30	2013–14	2nd	—	1942–43	III
Empoli	17	–	1986–87	2024–25	7th	—	2006–07	II
Chievo	17	–	2001–02	2018–19	4th	—	2005–06	IV
Catania	17	–	1954–55	2013–14	8th	—	1960–61, 1964–65, 2012–13	III
Ascoli	16	–	1974–75	2006–07	4th	—	1979–80	II
Padova	16	–	1929–30	1995–96	3rd	—	1957–58	II
**Como**	16	3	1949–50	Present	7th	—	1949–50	I
**Venezia**	14	1	1939–40	present	3rd	—	1941–42	I
Cesena (Note: Club became defunct, but was re-founded as Cesena FC.)	13	–	1973–74	2014–15	6th	—	1975–76	II
Novara	13	–	1936–37	2011–12	8th	—	1951–52	III
Modena	13	–	1929–30	2003–04	3rd	—	1946–47	II
Perugia	13	–	1975–76	2003–04	2nd	—	1978–79	III
Alessandria	13	–	1929–30	1959–60	7th	—	1931–32	IV
**Sassuolo**	13	2	2013–14	Present	6th	—	2015–16	I
Pro Patria	12	–	1929–30	1955–56	8th	—	1947–48	IV
Foggia	11	–	1964–65	1994–95	9th	—	1964–65, 1991–92, 1993–94	IV
Avellino	10	–	1978–79	1987–88	8th	—	1981–82, 1986–87	II
Siena	9	–	2003–04	2012–13	13th	—	2007–08	IV
Reggina	9	–	1999–2000	2008–09	10th	—	2004–05	IV
Cremonese	9	–	1929–30	2025–26	10th	—	1993–94	II
Piacenza	8	–	1993–94	2002–03	12th	—	1997–98, 1998–99, 2001–02	IV
Lucchese	8	–	1936–37	1951–52	8th	—	1936–37, 1948–49	IV
Sampierdarenese (Note: Club merged into Sampdoria.)	8	–	1934–35	1942–43	6th	—	1938–39	–
Pisa	8	–	1968–69	2025–26	11th	—	1982–83	II
Pescara	7	–	1977–78	2016–17	14th	—	1979–80, 1987–88	III
Catanzaro	7	–	1971–72	1982–83	7th	—	1981–82	II
Varese (Note: Club became defunct, but was re-founded as Città di Varese.)	7	–	1964–65	1974–75	8th	—	1967–68	IV
Mantova	7	–	1961–62	1971–72	9th	—	1961–62, 1966–67	II
Pro Vercelli	6	–	1929–30	1934–35	7th	—	1933–34	III
Salernitana	5	–	1947–48	2023–24	15th	—	1998–99, 2022–23	III
Messina	5	–	1963–64	2006–07	7th	—	2004–05	V
Casale	4	–	1930–31	1933–34	12th	—	1931–32	VI
**Monza**	4	1	2022–23	present	11th	—	2022–23	I
**Frosinone**	4	1	2015–16	present	18th	—	2023–24	I
Spezia	3	–	2020–21	2022–23	15th	—	2020–21	III
Crotone	3	–	2016–17	2020–21	17th	—	2016–17	III
Reggiana	3	–	1993–94	1996–97	14th	—	1993–94	III
Lecco	3	–	1960–61	1966–67	14th	—	1960–61	III
Legnano	3	–	1930–31	1953–54	18th	—	1930–31, 1953–54	V
Benevento	2	–	2017–18	2020–21	18th	—	2020–21	II
Ancona (Note: Club became defunct, but was re-founded as SSC Ancona ASD.)	2	–	1992–93	2003–04	17th	—	1992–93	IV
Ternana	2	–	1972–73	1974–75	15th	—	1974–75	III
Carpi	1	–	2015–16	2015–16	18th	—	2015–16	III
Treviso	1	–	2005–06	2005–06	19th	—	2005–06	III
Pistoiese	1	–	1980–81	1980–81	16th	—	1980–81	IV

=== Key ===
Club	Name of club
Seasons	Number of seasons in league
Cons. seas.	Number of consecutive seasons in league
First season	First season in league
Last season	Last season in league
Best result	Best result in league
Titles	Number of league titles won
Seasons of best result	Seasons best result occurred in
Curr. level	Current level (2026–27) in Italian league system
