= Samuele Spalluto =

Italian footballer (born 2001)

Personal information
- Date of birth: 15 February 2001 (age 25)
- Place of birth: San Pietro Vernotico, Italy
- Height: 1.87 m (6 ft 2 in)
- Position: Centre-forward

Team information
- Current team: Folgore Caratese
- Number: 9

Youth career
- –2021: Fiorentina

Senior career*
Years	Team	Apps	(Gls)
2021–2023	Fiorentina	0	(0)
2021–2022	→ Gubbio (loan)	27	(10)
2022	→ Ternana (loan)	3	(0)
2023	→ Novara (loan)	13	(2)
2023–2024	Monopoli	18	(0)
2024	→ Trento (loan)	12	(1)
2024–2026	Campobasso	20	(0)
2025	→ Legnago (loan)	13	(2)
2025–2026	→ Renate (loan)	17	(2)
2026–	Folgore Caratese	1	(0)
- * Club domestic league appearances and goals as of 24 August 2026

Samuele Spalluto (born 15 February 2001) is an Italian professional footballer who plays as a centre-forward for Serie C Group A club Folgore Caratese.

== Career ==
Raised in the youth academies of Lecce and Fiorentina, on 15 July 2021 Spalluto was loaned to Serie C club Gubbio, where he made his professional debut on 5 September, coming on as a substitute in the final minutes of a 1–0 league win over Fermana. He then scored his first professional goal on 19 October, in a 4–0 league win over Carrarese.

On 13 July 2022, Spalluto was sent on a season-long loan to Serie B side Ternana, with an option to buy included in the deal. He made his league debut for the club on 27 August 2022, coming on as a substitute for Andrea Favilli in a 4–1 away loss against Modena.

After collecting just three appearances in the first part of the season, on 12 January 2023 Spalluto was re-called by Fiorentina and loaned to Serie C club Novara until the end of the campaign.

On 25 August 2023, Spalluto joined Serie C club Monopoli on a permanent deal, signing a three-year contract. On 1 February 2024, Spalluto was loaned by Trento, with an option to buy.

On 16 July 2024, he joined Campobasso on permanent basis.
