= 2026–27 Catania FC season =

Catania FC
2026–27 season
- Manager: Emilio Longo
- Stadium: Stadio Angelo Massimino
- Coppa Italia Serie C: Second round
- Top goalscorer: League: Emanuele Cicerelli (5); All: Emanuele Cicerelli (5)
- Highest home attendance: 16,948 vs Internazionale U23
- Lowest home attendance: 7,375 vs Savoia

The 2026–27 season is Catania Football Club's fourth consecutive season in Serie C. The club also competed in the Coppa Italia Serie C.

== Transfers ==
=== In ===
Pos.	Player	Transferred from	Fee	Date	Source
GK	(Italy) Filippo Rinaldi	(Italy) Parma	Loan	23 July 2026	
DF	(Italy) Marco Perrotta	(Italy) Padova	Free	5 August 2026	
FW	(Italy) Flavio Russo	(Italy) Sassuolo	Loan	14 August 2026	
MF	(Italy) Edoardo Masciangelo	(Italy) Frosinone	Free	18 August 2026	
FW	(Italy) Massimo Coda	(Italy) Sampdoria	Free	24 August 2026	
MF	(Italy) Emanuele Torrasi	(Italy) Juve Stabia	Undisclosed	26 August 2026	

== Competitions ==
=== Overall record ===
Competition	First match	Last match	Starting round	Final position	Record							
Competition	First match	Last match	Starting round	Final position	Pld	W	D	L	GF	GA	GD	Win %
Serie C	23 August 2026		Matchday 1		14	7	1	6	26	14	+12	50.00
Coppa Italia Serie C	2 September 2026		Second round	Second round	1	0	0	1	0	3	−3	0.00
Total					15	7	1	7	26	17	+9	46.67

Source: Competitions

=== Serie C ===
2026–27 Serie C, Group C
Pos	Team	Pld	W	D	L	GF	GA	GD	Pts	Promotion or relegation
2	Bari	11	6	3	2	14	7	+7	21	Qualification for the national play-offs second round
3	Sorrento	11	6	2	3	15	11	+4	20	Qualification for the national play-offs first round
4	Catania	11	6	1	4	24	12	+12	19	Qualification for the group play-offs second round
5	Monopoli	11	5	3	3	13	9	+4	18	Qualification for the group play-offs first round
6	Audace Cerignola	11	5	2	4	18	11	+7	17	Qualification for the group play-offs first round

Updated to match(es) played on 29 October 2026. Source: Lega Pro
Rules for classification: 1) Points; 2) Head-to-head points; 3) Head-to-head goal difference; 4) Goal difference; 5) Goals scored; 6) Lower goals against; 7) Wins; 8) Lower losses; 9) Away wins; 10) Lower home losses.
(Note: Head-to-head record is used only after all the matches between the teams in question have been played)

Overall								Home						Away					
Pld	W	D	L	GF	GA	GD	Pts	W	D	L	GF	GA	GD	W	D	L	GF	GA	GD
14	7	1	6	26	14	+12	22	4	1	2	16	5	+11	3	0	4	10	9	+1

==== Results by round ====
Round	1	2	3	4	5	6	7	8	9	10	11	12	13	14
Ground	H	A	H	H	A	H	A	H	A	A	H	A	H	A
Result	L	L	W	L	W	D	W	W	W	L	W	L	W	L
Position														
Points	0	0	3	3	6	7	10	13	16	16	19	19	22	22

Updated to match(es) played on November 2026. Source:
A = Away; H = Home; W = Win; D = Draw; L = Loss

==== Matches ====
23 August 2026 1	Catania	1–2	Inter U23	Catania
18:00 UTC+2		Report		Stadium: Stadio Angelo Massimino; Attendance: 16,948; Referee: Bruno Spina

29 August 2026 2	Monopoli	2–0	Catania	Monopoli
21:00

7 September 2026 3	Catania	4–0	Cosenza	Catania
20:30 UTC+2		Report		Stadium: Stadio Angelo Massimino; Attendance: 14,893; Referee: Simone Gauzolino

12 September 2026 4	Catania	1–2	Scafatese	Catania
18:00 UTC+2		Report		Stadium: Stadio Angelo Massimino; Attendance: 15,119; Referee: Erminio Cerbasi

15 September 2026 5	Picerno	2–4	Catania	Picerno
18:30 UTC+2

19 September 2026 6	Catania	0–0	Barletta	Catania
20:30 UTC+2		Report		Stadium: Stadio Angelo Massimino; Attendance: 15,571; Referee: Filippo Colaninno

27 September 2026 7	Casertana	1–2	Catania	Caserta
12:30 UTC+2

3 October 2026 8	Catania	2–1	Crotone	Catania
20:30 UTC+2		Report		Stadium: Stadio Angelo Massimino; Attendance: 16,436; Referee: Riccardo Tropiano

11 October 2026 9	Team Altamura	0–3	Catania	Altamura
12:30 UTC+2

17 October 2026 10	Potenza	2–1	Catania	Potenza
17:30 UTC+2

25 October 2026 11	Catania	6–0	Giugliano	Catania
15:00 UTC+2		Report		Stadium: Stadio Angelo Massimino; Attendance: 16,395; Referee: Leonardo Di Mario

31 October 2026 12	Audace Cerignola	1–0	Catania	Cerignola
14:30 UTC+2

8 November 2026 13	Catania	2–0	Sorrento	Catania
14:30 UTC+2				Stadium: Stadio Angelo Massimino

15 November 2026 13	Salernitana	1–0	Catania	Salerno
14:30 UTC+2

=== Coppa Italia Serie C ===
2 September 2026 Second round	Catania	0–3	Savoia	Catania
21:00 UTC+2		Report		Stadium: Stadio Angelo Massimino; Attendance: 7,375; Referee: Gerardo Simone Caruso
