= 2026–27 in Italian football =

Football in Italy
- Season: 2026–27

Women's football
- Serie A Women's Cup: Juventus

The 2026–27 season was the 125th season of competitive football in Italy.

== National teams ==
=== Men ===
==== Italy national football team ====
===== UEFA Nations League =====
====== League A Group 1 ======
Pos	Team	Pld	W	D	L	GF	GA	GD	Pts	Qualification or relegation	(France)	(Belgium)	(Italy)	(Turkey)
1	France	6	4	1	1	10	6	+4	13	Advance to quarter-finals	—	4–1	1–1	2–1
2	Belgium	6	4	0	2	12	7	+5	12	Advance to quarter-finals	0–1	—	4–1	3–0
3	Italy	6	3	1	2	12	10	+2	10		3–1	0–2	—	3–1
4	Turkey (R)	6	0	0	6	4	15	−11	0	Relegated to League B	0–1	1–2	1–4	—

Source: UEFA
Rules for classification: Tiebreakers
(R) Relegated

25 September 2026 MD 1	Italy	0–2	Belgium	Rome, Italy
20:45 UTC+2		Report	Godts 20'; Lukébakio 69'	Stadium: Stadio Olimpico; Attendance: 47,155; Referee: Daniel Siebert (Germany)

28 September 2026 MD 2	Turkey	1–4	Italy	Bursa, Turkey
20:45 UTC+2	Yılmaz 47'		Bastoni 9'; Frattesi 22'; Kayode 27'; Esposito 50'	Stadium: Centennial Atatürk Stadium; Attendance: 33,891; Referee: Michael Oliver (England)

2 October 2026 MD 3	France	1–1	Italy	Saint-Denis, France
20:45 UTC+2	Olise 55'	Report	Bastoni 68'	Stadium: Stade de France; Attendance: 77,118; Referee: Jesús Gil Manzano (Spain)

5 October 2026 MD 4	Italy	3–1	Turkey	Bologna, Italy
20:45 UTC+2	Scamacca 26'; Calafiori 64'; Esposito 87'	Report	Şimşir 61'	Stadium: Stadio Renato Dall'Ara; Attendance: 30,040; Referee: Szymon Marciniak (Poland)

12 November 2026 MD 5	Italy	3–1	France	Milan, Italy
20:45 UTC+1	P. Esposito 26', 75' (pen.); Frattesi 63'	Report	Olise 10'	Stadium: San Siro; Attendance: 71,452; Referee: István Kovács (Romania)

15 November 2026 MD 6	Belgium	4–1	Italy	Brussels, Belgium
20:45 UTC+1	De Cuyper 15'; Ngoy 22'; Doku 26'; Moreira 80'	Report	Esposito 11'	Stadium: King Baudouin Stadium; Attendance: 41,842; Referee: Espen Eskås (Norway)

=== Women ===
==== Italy women's national football team ====
===== 2027 FIFA Women's World Cup qualification =====
====== 2027 FIFA Women's World Cup qualification – UEFA League A Group A1 ======
Pos	Team	Pld	W	D	L	GF	GA	GD	Pts	Qualification or relegation
1	Denmark	6	4	2	0	12	5	+7	14	Qualification to 2027 FIFA Women's World Cup
2	Italy	6	2	3	1	12	4	+8	9	Advance to play-offs
3	Sweden	6	2	2	2	6	6	0	8	Advance to play-offs
4	Serbia (R)	6	0	1	5	2	17	−15	1	Advance to play-offs and relegation to League B

Source: UEFA
Rules for classification: Tiebreakers
(R) Relegated

====== 2027 FIFA Women's World Cup qualification – UEFA play-offs ======
Round 1

Team 1	Agg.	Team 2	1st leg	2nd leg
Belarus	1–3	Italy	0–2	1–1

Round 2

Team 1	Agg.	Team 2	1st leg	2nd leg
Finland		Italy	1 Dec	5 Dec

== UEFA competitions ==
=== UEFA Champions League ===
==== League phase ====
===== Como =====
Pos	Team	Pld	W	D	L	GF	GA	GD	Pts	Qualification
2	(Spain) Real Madrid	4	4	0	0	13	7	+6	12	Advance to round of 16 (seeded)
3	(England) Arsenal	4	3	1	0	8	3	+5	10	Advance to round of 16 (seeded)
4	(Italy) Como	4	3	0	1	19	6	+13	9	Advance to round of 16 (seeded)
5	(Spain) Barcelona	4	3	0	1	14	6	+8	9	Advance to round of 16 (seeded)
6	(England) Aston Villa	4	3	0	1	12	6	+6	9	Advance to round of 16 (seeded)

Updated to match(es) played on 4 November 2026. Source: UEFA
Rules for classification: League phase tiebreakers

Home team	Score	Away team
Como (Italy)	4–1	(Germany) RB Leipzig
Feyenoord (Netherlands)	3–2	(Italy) Como
Como (Italy)	4–1	(England) Manchester United
Lens (France)	1–9	(Italy) Como
Como (Italy)	24 Nov	(Greece) AEK Athens
Real Betis (Spain)	9 Dec	(Italy) Como
Como (Italy)	20 Jan	(France) Paris Saint-Germain
Barcelona (Spain)	27 Jan	(Italy) Como

===== Inter Milan =====
Pos	Team	Pld	W	D	L	GF	GA	GD	Pts	Qualification
13	(Germany) Bayern Munich	4	2	2	0	12	5	+7	8	Advance to knockout phase play-offs (seeded)
14	(Germany) VfB Stuttgart	4	2	1	1	7	4	+3	7	Advance to knockout phase play-offs (seeded)
15	(Italy) Inter Milan	4	2	0	2	8	6	+2	6	Advance to knockout phase play-offs (seeded)
16	(Austria) LASK	4	2	0	2	10	9	+1	6	Advance to knockout phase play-offs (seeded)
17	(England) Manchester United	4	2	0	2	8	8	0	6	Advance to knockout phase play-offs (unseeded)

Updated to match(es) played on 4 November 2026. Source: UEFA
Rules for classification: League phase tiebreakers

Home team	Score	Away team
Real Madrid (Spain)	2–1	(Italy) Inter Milan
Inter Milan (Italy)	3–4	(Belgium) Club Brugge
Inter Milan (Italy)	1–0	(Ukraine) Shakhtar Donetsk
Feyenoord (Netherlands)	0–3	(Italy) Inter Milan
Inter Milan (Italy)	25 Nov	(Germany) VfB Stuttgart
Borussia Dortmund (Germany)	9 Dec	(Italy) Inter Milan
Inter Milan (Italy)	19 Jan	(England) Liverpool
Slovan Bratislava (Slovakia)	27 Jan	(Italy) Inter Milan

===== Napoli =====
Pos	Team	Pld	W	D	L	GF	GA	GD	Pts
25	(Norway) Bodø/Glimt	4	1	1	2	4	9	−5	4
26	(Portugal) Porto	4	1	0	3	6	7	−1	3
27	(Italy) Napoli	4	1	0	3	6	11	−5	3
28	(Spain) Villarreal	4	1	0	3	8	14	−6	3
29	(Greece) AEK Athens	4	1	0	3	5	11	−6	3

Updated to match(es) played on 4 November 2026. Source: UEFA
Rules for classification: League phase tiebreakers

Home team	Score	Away team
Napoli (Italy)	0–1	(England) Arsenal
Villarreal (Spain)	3–1	(Italy) Napoli
Napoli (Italy)	4–3	(Norway) Bodø/Glimt
Porto (Portugal)	4–1	(Italy) Napoli
Manchester City (England)	24 Nov	(Italy) Napoli
Napoli (Italy)	8 Dec	(Belgium) Club Brugge
Sabah (Azerbaijan)	20 Jan	(Italy) Napoli
Napoli (Italy)	27 Jan	(Norway) Viking

===== Roma =====
Pos	Team	Pld	W	D	L	GF	GA	GD	Pts	Qualification
18	(Turkey) Galatasaray	4	2	0	2	8	9	−1	6	Advance to knockout phase play-offs (unseeded)
19	(Turkey) Fenerbahçe	4	1	2	1	6	11	−5	5	Advance to knockout phase play-offs (unseeded)
20	(Italy) Roma	4	1	1	2	10	8	+2	4	Advance to knockout phase play-offs (unseeded)
21	(Ukraine) Shakhtar Donetsk	4	1	1	2	4	4	0	4	Advance to knockout phase play-offs (unseeded)
22	(Norway) Viking	4	1	1	2	9	10	−1	4	Advance to knockout phase play-offs (unseeded)

Updated to match(es) played on 4 November 2026. Source: UEFA
Rules for classification: League phase tiebreakers

Home team	Score	Away team
Fenerbahçe (Turkey)	1–1	(Italy) Roma
Roma (Italy)	3–4	(Spain) Real Madrid
Roma (Italy)	4–0	(Slovakia) Slovan Bratislava
Porto (Portugal)	4–1	(Italy) Roma
Paris Saint-Germain (France)	25 Nov	(Italy) Roma
Roma (Italy)	8 Dec	(Portugal) Sporting CP
AEK Athens (Greece)	19 Jan	(Italy) Roma
Roma (Italy)	27 Jan	(France) Lille

=== UEFA Europa League ===
==== League phase ====
===== Juventus =====
Pos	Team	Pld	W	D	L	GF	GA	GD	Pts	Qualification
3	(Hungary) Ferencváros	4	4	0	0	11	3	+8	12	Advance to round of 16 (seeded)
4	(Belgium) Union Saint-Gilloise	4	3	1	0	10	2	+8	10	Advance to round of 16 (seeded)
5	(Italy) Juventus	4	3	1	0	11	4	+7	10	Advance to round of 16 (seeded)
6	(Greece) Olympiacos	4	3	1	0	4	1	+3	10	Advance to round of 16 (seeded)
7	(Germany) Bayer Leverkusen	4	3	0	1	8	1	+7	9	Advance to round of 16 (seeded)

Updated to match(es) played on 5 November 2026. Source: UEFA
Rules for classification: League phase tiebreakers

Home team	Score	Away team
Juventus (Italy)	5–0	(Netherlands) NEC
Celta Vigo (Spain)	1–2	(Italy) Juventus
Juventus (Italy)	2–2	(France) Rennes
AZ (Netherlands)	1–2	(Italy) Juventus
Juventus (Italy)	26 Nov	(Cyprus) Omonia
Hapoel Be'er Sheva (Israel)	10 Dec	(Italy) Juventus
Ferencváros (Hungary)	21 Jan	(Italy) Juventus
Juventus (Italy)	28 Jan	(Spain) Real Sociedad

===== Milan =====
Pos	Team	Pld	W	D	L	GF	GA	GD	Pts
26	(Austria) Red Bull Salzburg	4	1	1	2	3	8	−5	4
27	(Spain) Celta Vigo	4	1	0	3	4	6	−2	3
28	(Italy) Milan	4	1	0	3	4	7	−3	3
29	(Poland) Jagiellonia Białystok	4	1	0	3	4	7	−3	3
30	(Czech Republic) Viktoria Plzeň	4	1	0	3	3	7	−4	3

Updated to match(es) played on 5 November 2026. Source: UEFA
Rules for classification: League phase tiebreakers

Home team	Score	Away team
Milan (Italy)	0–2	(Portugal) Benfica
Salzburg (Austria)	0–4	(Italy) Milan
Bournemouth (England)	3–0	(Italy) Milan
Milan (Italy)	0–2	(Hungary) Ferencváros
Olympiacos (Greece)	26 Nov	(Italy) Milan
Milan (Italy)	10 Dec	(England) Sunderland
Levski Sofia (Bulgaria)	21 Jan	(Italy) Milan
Milan (Italy)	28 Jan	Ararat-Armenia

=== UEFA Conference League ===
==== Play-off round ====
Team 1	Agg.	Team 2	1st leg	2nd leg
Atalanta (Italy)	1–0	(Israel) Hapoel Tel Aviv	0–0	1–0

==== League phase ====
===== Atalanta =====
Pos	Team	Pld	W	D	L	GF	GA	GD	Pts	Qualification
14	(Germany) SC Freiburg	3	2	0	1	4	5	−1	6	Advance to knockout phase play-offs (seeded)
15	(Serbia) Red Star Belgrade	3	1	1	1	6	6	0	4	Advance to knockout phase play-offs (seeded)
16	(Italy) Atalanta	3	1	1	1	4	4	0	4	Advance to knockout phase play-offs (seeded)
17	(Portugal) Braga	3	1	1	1	2	3	−1	4	Advance to knockout phase play-offs (unseeded)
18	(Belgium) Gent	3	1	1	1	1	2	−1	4	Advance to knockout phase play-offs (unseeded)

Updated to match(es) played on 5 November 2026. Source: UEFA
Rules for classification: League phase tiebreakers

Home team	Score	Away team
Atalanta (Italy)	3–1	(Cyprus) Pafos
Ajax (Netherlands)	2–0	(Italy) Atalanta
Atalanta (Italy)	1–1	(Kazakhstan) Kairat
Borac Banja Luka (Bosnia and Herzegovina)	26 Nov	(Italy) Atalanta
Riga (Latvia)	10 Dec	(Italy) Atalanta
Atalanta (Italy)	17 Dec	(Sweden) Mjällby AIF

=== UEFA Women's Champions League ===
==== Qualifying rounds ====
===== Second qualifying round =====
====== Semi-finals ======
Semi-finals
Team 1	Score	Team 2
Juventus (Italy)	2–1	(Portugal) Torreense

====== Final ======
Final
Team 1	Score	Team 2
Juventus (Italy)	3–1(a.e.t.)	(Sweden) Hammarby IF

===== Third qualifying round =====
Third qualifying round
Team 1	Agg.	Team 2	1st leg	2nd leg
St. Pölten (Austria)	1–4	(Italy) Juventus	0–3	1–1
VfL Wolfsburg (Germany)	3–3 (4–5 p)	(Italy) Inter Milan	2–0	1–3 (a.e.t.)

==== League stage ====
===== Inter Milan =====
Pos	Team	Pld	W	D	L	GF	GA	GD	Pts	Qualification
12	(French Football Federation) Paris FC	5	1	2	2	7	12	−5	5	Advance to the knockout phase play-offs (unseeded)
13	(Danish Football Association) HB Køge	5	1	1	3	7	13	−6	4	
14	(Italian Football Federation) Inter Milan	5	1	1	3	4	14	−10	4	
15	(Swiss Football Association) Servette Chênois	5	1	0	4	7	22	−15	3	
16	(Swedish Football Association) BK Häcken	5	0	2	3	1	7	−6	2	

Updated to match(es) played on 19 November 2026. Source: UEFA
Rules for classification: League phase tiebreakers

Home team	Score	Away team
Inter Milan (Italy)	1–0	(Sweden) BK Häcken
Austria Wien	1–1	(Italy) Inter Milan
OL Lyonnes (France)	6–0	(Italy) Inter Milan
Inter Milan (Italy)	1–4	(England) Manchester City
Real Madrid (Spain)	18 Nov	(Italy) Inter Milan
Inter Milan (Italy)	16 Dec	(England) Arsenal

===== Juventus =====
Pos	Team	Pld	W	D	L	GF	GA	GD	Pts	Qualification
5	(The Football Association) Manchester City (T)	5	2	3	0	10	5	+5	9 (Note: Ranked based on away goals scored, Manchester City 8, Real Madrid 3)	Advance to the knockout phase play-offs (seeded)
6	(Royal Spanish Football Federation) Real Madrid (T)	5	2	3	0	10	5	+5	9	Advance to the knockout phase play-offs (seeded)
7	(Italian Football Federation) Juventus (T)	5	3	0	2	10	9	+1	9	Advance to the knockout phase play-offs (seeded)
8	(The Football Association) Arsenal (T)	5	2	2	1	7	5	+2	8	Advance to the knockout phase play-offs (seeded)
9	(Italian Football Federation) Roma	5	2	1	2	5	11	−6	7	Advance to the knockout phase play-offs (unseeded)

Updated to match(es) played on 19 November 2026. Source: UEFA
Rules for classification: League phase tiebreakers
(T) Qualified, but not yet for the particular phase indicated
Notes:

Home team	Score	Away team
Juventus (Italy)	1–2	(Portugal) Benfica
BK Häcken (Sweden)	0–3	(Italy) Juventus
Austria Wien	1–4	(Italy) Juventus
Juventus (Italy)	0–6	(France) OL Lyonnes
Juventus (Italy)	18 Nov	(Belgium) OH Leuven
Paris Saint-Germain (France)	16 Dec	(Italy) Juventus

===== Roma =====
Pos	Team	Pld	W	D	L	GF	GA	GD	Pts	Qualification
7	(Italian Football Federation) Juventus (T)	5	3	0	2	10	9	+1	9	Advance to the knockout phase play-offs (seeded)
8	(The Football Association) Arsenal (T)	5	2	2	1	7	5	+2	8	Advance to the knockout phase play-offs (seeded)
9	(Italian Football Federation) Roma	5	2	1	2	5	11	−6	7	Advance to the knockout phase play-offs (unseeded)
10	(Portuguese Football Federation) Benfica	5	2	0	3	7	11	−4	6	Advance to the knockout phase play-offs (unseeded)
11	(French Football Federation) Paris Saint-Germain	5	1	2	2	8	5	+3	5	Advance to the knockout phase play-offs (unseeded)

Updated to match(es) played on 19 November 2026. Source: UEFA
Rules for classification: League phase tiebreakers
(T) Qualified, but not yet for the particular phase indicated

Home team	Score	Away team
OH Leuven (Belgium)	0–0	(Italy) Roma
Roma (Italy)	0–6	(Spain) Barcelona
Chelsea (England)	2–0	(Italy) Roma
Roma (Italy)	2–1	(Switzerland) Servette Chênois
Benfica (Portugal)	19 Nov	(Italy) Roma
Roma (Italy)	16 Dec	(Spain) Real Madrid

=== UEFA Youth League ===
==== UEFA Champions League Path ====
===== Como =====
Pos	Team	Pld	W	D	L	GF	GA	GD	Pts	Qualification
22	(Germany) Bayern Munich	4	1	1	2	10	10	0	4	Advance to knockout phase
23	(England) Arsenal	4	1	1	2	7	8	−1	4	
24	(Italy) Como	4	1	1	2	4	5	−1	4	
25	(England) Aston Villa	4	1	1	2	8	10	−2	4	
26	(Austria) LASK	4	1	1	2	5	7	−2	4	

Updated to match(es) played on 4 November 2026. Source: UEFA
Rules for classification: League phase tiebreakers

Home team	Score	Away team
Como (Italy)	1–1	(Germany) RB Leipzig
Feyenoord (Netherlands)	1–0	(Italy) Como
Como (Italy)	2–1	(England) Manchester United
Lens (France)	2–1	(Italy) Como
Como (Italy)	24 Nov	(Greece) AEK Athens
Real Betis (Spain)	9 Dec	(Italy) Como

===== Inter Milan =====
Pos	Team	Pld	W	D	L	GF	GA	GD	Pts
25	(England) Aston Villa	4	1	1	2	8	10	−2	4
26	(Austria) LASK	4	1	1	2	5	7	−2	4
27	(Italy) Inter Milan	4	1	1	2	4	7	−3	4
28	(England) Manchester City	4	1	1	2	4	7	−3	4
29	(Italy) Napoli	4	1	0	3	3	10	−7	3

Updated to match(es) played on 4 November 2026. Source: UEFA
Rules for classification: League phase tiebreakers

Home team	Score	Away team
Real Madrid (Spain)	3–0	(Italy) Inter Milan
Inter Milan (Italy)	1–1	(Belgium) Club Brugge
Inter Milan (Italy)	2–0	(Ukraine) Shakhtar Donetsk
Feyenoord (Netherlands)	3–1	(Italy) Inter Milan
Inter Milan (Italy)	25 Nov	(Germany) VfB Stuttgart
Borussia Dortmund (Germany)	9 Dec	(Italy) Inter Milan

===== Napoli =====
Pos	Team	Pld	W	D	L	GF	GA	GD	Pts
27	(Italy) Inter Milan	4	1	1	2	4	7	−3	4
28	(England) Manchester City	4	1	1	2	4	7	−3	4
29	(Italy) Napoli	4	1	0	3	3	10	−7	3
30	(Slovakia) Slovan Bratislava	4	1	0	3	3	13	−10	3
31	(Norway) Bodø/Glimt	4	1	0	3	3	13	−10	3

Updated to match(es) played on 4 November 2026. Source: UEFA
Rules for classification: League phase tiebreakers

Home team	Score	Away team
Napoli (Italy)	1–2	(England) Arsenal
Villarreal (Spain)	5–0	(Italy) Napoli
Napoli (Italy)	1–0	(Norway) Bodø/Glimt
Porto (Portugal)	3–1	(Italy) Napoli
Manchester City (England)	24 Nov	(Italy) Napoli
Napoli (Italy)	8 Dec	(Belgium) Club Brugge

===== Roma =====
Pos	Team	Pld	W	D	L	GF	GA	GD	Pts	Qualification
9	(England) Liverpool	4	2	2	0	11	7	+4	8	Advance to knockout phase
10	(Germany) Borussia Dortmund	4	2	1	1	11	5	+6	7	Advance to knockout phase
11	(Italy) Roma	4	2	1	1	10	4	+6	7	Advance to knockout phase
12	(France) Paris Saint-Germain	4	2	1	1	9	5	+4	7	Advance to knockout phase
13	(Belgium) Club Brugge	4	2	1	1	12	9	+3	7	Advance to knockout phase

Updated to match(es) played on 4 November 2026. Source: UEFA
Rules for classification: League phase tiebreakers

Home team	Score	Away team
Fenerbahçe (Turkey)	2–4	(Italy) Roma
Roma (Italy)	0–1	(Spain) Real Madrid
Roma (Italy)	5–0	(Slovakia) Slovan Bratislava
Manchester United (England)	1–1	(Italy) Roma
Paris Saint-Germain (France)	25 Nov	(Italy) Roma
Roma (Italy)	8 Dec	(Portugal) Sporting CP

==== Domestic Champions Path ====
===== Second round =====
Team 1	Agg.	Team 2	1st leg	2nd leg
Fiorentina (Italy)	8–0	(Bulgaria) Septemvri Sofia	5–0	3–0

===== Third round =====
Team 1	Agg.	Team 2	1st leg	2nd leg
Dinamo Tbilisi (Georgia (country))		(Italy) Fiorentina	25 Nov	9 Dec

== League and Cup (men's) ==
=== Serie A ===
Pos	Team	Pld	W	D	L	GF	GA	GD	Pts	Qualification or relegation
1	Lazio	11	9	2	0	25	9	+16	29	Qualification for the Champions League league phase
2	Inter Milan	11	9	1	1	28	13	+15	28	Qualification for the Champions League league phase
3	Roma	11	8	3	0	31	10	+21	27	Qualification for the Champions League league phase
4	AC Milan	11	7	3	1	23	13	+10	24	Qualification for the Champions League league phase
5	Como	11	7	2	2	18	10	+8	23	Qualification for the Europa League league phase (Note: The winners of the 2026–27 Coppa Italia and the fifth-placed team both qualify for the Europa League league phase. If the Coppa Italia winners finish in the top five, the sixth-placed team will qualify for the Europa League league phase. If Italy are one of the two associations with the highest UEFA coefficient points, fifth place will qualify for the Champions League league phase and the other qualifying spots will move down one position.)
6	Frosinone	11	6	2	3	24	15	+9	20	Qualification for the Conference League play-off round
7	Juventus	11	5	3	3	15	12	+3	18	
8	Bologna	11	5	2	4	16	14	+2	17	
9	Cagliari	11	5	1	5	10	15	−5	16	
10	Napoli	11	4	3	4	18	14	+4	15	
11	Torino	11	4	2	5	15	17	−2	14	
12	Atalanta	11	4	2	5	17	20	−3	14	
13	Genoa	11	4	1	6	11	16	−5	13	
14	Lecce	11	3	1	7	12	22	−10	10	
15	Fiorentina	11	2	3	6	17	25	−8	9	
16	Parma	11	2	2	7	9	17	−8	8	
17	Sassuolo	11	2	2	7	16	29	−13	8	
18	Monza	11	2	1	8	17	25	−8	7	Relegation to Serie B
19	Venezia	11	2	0	9	8	21	−13	6	Relegation to Serie B
20	Udinese	11	1	2	8	12	25	−13	5	Relegation to Serie B

Updated to match(es) played on 8 November 2026. Source: Serie A
Rules for classification: 1) Points; 2) Head-to-head points; 3) Head-to-head goal difference; 4) Goal difference; 5) Goals scored; 6) Drawing of lots.
End-of-season ties on points for 1st or 17th are instead decided by a one- or two-leg play-off, respectively, unless the play-off would involve a UEFA competition finalist (in which case rules 2–6 apply). Rules 2–6 determine home advantage (for 17th, the better-ranked team hosts the second leg); if three or more teams are tied, they also select the two play-off teams.

=== Serie B ===
Pos	Team	Pld	W	D	L	GF	GA	GD	Pts	Qualification or relegation
1	Palermo	11	8	3	0	25	13	+12	27	Promotion to Serie A
2	Modena	11	7	2	2	20	10	+10	23	Promotion to Serie A
3	Ascoli	11	5	5	1	17	7	+10	20	Qualification for the promotion play-offs semi-finals
4	Mantova	11	5	4	2	15	11	+4	19	Qualification for the promotion play-offs semi-finals
5	Hellas Verona	11	4	4	3	19	13	+6	16	Qualification for the promotion play-offs quarter-finals
6	Avellino	11	4	4	3	16	11	+5	16	Qualification for the promotion play-offs quarter-finals
7	Benevento	11	4	4	3	15	11	+4	16	Qualification for the promotion play-offs quarter-finals
8	Pisa	11	4	4	3	20	17	+3	16	Qualification for the promotion play-offs quarter-finals
9	Cremonese	11	4	3	4	14	12	+2	15	
10	Südtirol	11	3	6	2	13	12	+1	15	
11	Padova	11	4	3	4	12	13	−1	15	
12	Cesena	11	3	6	2	12	14	−2	15	
13	Juve Stabia	11	4	4	3	12	11	+1	12 (Note: Juve Stabia were deducted 2 points for administrative and financial irregularities and a further 2 points for tax payment irregularities.)	
14	Sampdoria	11	3	2	6	11	18	−7	11	
15	Arezzo	11	3	2	6	9	20	−11	11	
16	Virtus Entella	11	2	4	5	11	14	−3	10	Qualification for the relegation play-out
17	Carrarese	11	3	1	7	9	14	−5	10	Qualification for the relegation play-out
18	Empoli	11	2	3	6	12	19	−7	9	Relegation to Serie C
19	Vicenza	11	2	3	6	14	24	−10	9	Relegation to Serie C
20	Catanzaro	11	1	3	7	11	23	−12	6	Relegation to Serie C

Updated to match(es) played on 8 November 2026. Source: Serie B
Rules for classification: 1) Points; 2) Head-to-head points; 3) Head-to-head goal difference; 4) Goal difference; 5) Goals scored; 6) Draw.

=== Serie C ===
==== Group A ====
2026–27 Serie C, Group A
Pos	Team	Pld	W	D	L	GF	GA	GD	Pts	Promotion or relegation
1	Cittadella	14	10	2	2	21	8	+13	32	Promotion to Serie B and qualification for Supercoppa di Serie C
2	Union Brescia	14	9	4	1	28	12	+16	31	Qualification for the national play-offs second round
3	Trento	14	8	6	0	21	8	+13	30	Qualification for the national play-offs first round
4	Ospitaletto	14	7	4	3	20	11	+9	25	Qualification for the group play-offs second round
5	Arzignano	14	7	3	4	22	17	+5	24	Qualification for the group play-offs first round
6	Treviso	14	6	4	4	14	12	+2	22	Qualification for the group play-offs first round
7	Lecco	14	5	6	3	23	12	+11	21	Qualification for the group play-offs first round
8	Alcione Milano	14	4	6	4	23	22	+1	18	Qualification for the group play-offs first round
9	Pergolettese	14	4	6	4	14	15	−1	18	Qualification for the group play-offs first round
10	AlbinoLeffe	14	4	5	5	21	21	0	17	Qualification for the group play-offs first round
11	Pro Vercelli	14	4	5	5	15	22	−7	17	
12	Lumezzane	14	4	4	6	15	19	−4	16	
13	Desenzano	14	3	5	6	13	18	−5	14	
14	Novara	14	3	5	6	12	19	−7	14	
15	Juventus Next Gen	14	3	5	6	15	23	−8	14	
16	Carpi	14	3	5	6	17	27	−10	14	Qualification for the relegation play-outs
17	Giana Erminio	14	2	7	5	14	18	−4	13	Qualification for the relegation play-outs
18	Renate	14	2	6	6	20	21	−1	12	Qualification for the relegation play-outs
19	Dolomiti Bellunesi	14	2	4	8	10	23	−13	10	Qualification for the relegation play-outs
20	Folgore Caratese	14	1	6	7	13	23	−10	9	Relegation to Serie D

Updated to match(es) played on 19 November 2026. Source: Lega Pro
Rules for classification: 1) Points; 2) Head-to-head points; 3) Head-to-head goal difference; 4) Goal difference; 5) Goals scored; 6) Lower goals against; 7) Wins; 8) Lower losses; 9) Away wins; 10) Lower home losses.
(Note: Head-to-head record is used only after all the matches between the teams in question have been played)

==== Group B ====
2026–27 Serie C, Group B
Pos	Team	Pld	W	D	L	GF	GA	GD	Pts	Promotion or relegation
1	Spezia	14	12	2	0	28	6	+22	38	Promotion to Serie B and qualification for Supercoppa di Serie C
2	Ravenna	14	10	2	2	27	8	+19	32	Qualification for the national play-offs second round
3	Pescara	14	7	4	3	21	15	+6	25	Qualification for the national play-offs first round
4	Torres	14	7	4	3	16	12	+4	25	Qualification for the group play-offs second round
5	Grosseto	14	6	5	3	28	21	+7	23	Qualification for the group play-offs first round
6	Reggiana	14	6	3	5	19	15	+4	21	Qualification for the group play-offs first round
7	Guidonia Montecelio	14	5	6	3	19	16	+3	21	Qualification for the group play-offs first round
8	Livorno	14	5	6	3	18	17	+1	21	Qualification for the group play-offs first round
9	Campobasso	14	5	4	5	19	25	−6	19	Qualification for the group play-offs first round
10	Latina	14	4	6	4	16	14	+2	18	Qualification for the group play-offs first round
11	Atalanta U23	13	6	0	7	18	21	−3	18	
12	Pineto	13	4	5	4	11	13	−2	17	
13	Perugia	14	5	2	7	18	22	−4	17	
14	Vado	14	4	4	6	15	19	−4	16	
15	Forlì	14	3	6	5	17	20	−3	15	
16	Pianese	14	2	7	5	12	17	−5	13	Qualification for the relegation play-outs
17	Gubbio	14	3	2	9	13	24	−11	11	Qualification for the relegation play-outs
18	Sambenedettese	14	2	4	8	18	25	−7	10	Qualification for the relegation play-outs
19	Ostia Mare	14	2	4	8	12	21	−9	10	Qualification for the relegation play-outs
20	Vis Pesaro	14	2	2	10	15	29	−14	8	Relegation to Serie D

Updated to match(es) played on 19 November 2026. Source: Lega Pro
Rules for classification: 1) Points; 2) Head-to-head points; 3) Head-to-head goal difference; 4) Goal difference; 5) Goals scored; 6) Lower goals against; 7) Wins; 8) Lower losses; 9) Away wins; 10) Lower home losses.
(Note: Head-to-head record is used only after all the matches between the teams in question have been played)

==== Group C ====
2026–27 Serie C, Group C
Pos	Team	Pld	W	D	L	GF	GA	GD	Pts	Promotion or relegation
1	Potenza	14	11	2	1	39	18	+21	35	Promotion to Serie B and qualification for Supercoppa di Serie C
2	Bari	14	7	5	2	19	11	+8	26	Qualification for the national play-offs second round
3	Sorrento	14	7	2	5	18	16	+2	23	Qualification for the national play-offs first round
4	Catania	14	7	1	6	26	14	+12	22	Qualification for the group play-offs second round
5	Scafatese	14	5	6	3	22	21	+1	21	Qualification for the group play-offs first round
6	Audace Cerignola	13	6	2	5	20	15	+5	20	Qualification for the group play-offs first round
7	Monopoli	14	5	5	4	14	11	+3	20	Qualification for the group play-offs first round
8	Inter Milan U23	13	6	2	5	22	20	+2	20	Qualification for the group play-offs first round
9	Casertana	14	5	5	4	18	17	+1	20	Qualification for the group play-offs first round
10	Cavese	14	5	4	5	24	22	+2	19	Qualification for the group play-offs first round
11	Picerno	14	6	1	7	24	23	+1	19	
12	Barletta	14	4	6	4	16	16	0	18	
13	Salernitana	14	4	6	4	16	17	−1	18	
14	Casarano	14	5	3	6	18	22	−4	18	
15	Altamura	14	4	4	6	13	21	−8	16	
16	Giugliano	14	5	1	8	19	32	−13	16	Qualification for the relegation play-outs
17	Foggia	14	4	3	7	15	19	−4	15	Qualification for the relegation play-outs
18	Savoia	14	3	6	5	17	23	−6	15	Qualification for the relegation play-outs
19	Cosenza	14	3	4	7	12	24	−12	13	Qualification for the relegation play-outs
20	Crotone (Note: Crotone were deducted 6 points due to administrative irregularities.)	14	1	4	9	12	22	−10	1	Relegation to Serie D

Updated to match(es) played on 19 November 2026. Source: Lega Pro
Rules for classification: 1) Points; 2) Head-to-head points; 3) Head-to-head goal difference; 4) Goal difference; 5) Goals scored; 6) Lower goals against; 7) Wins; 8) Lower losses; 9) Away wins; 10) Lower home losses.
(Note: Head-to-head record is used only after all the matches between the teams in question have been played)

=== Supercoppa Italiana ===
==== Final ====
22 December 2026
21:00 CET

Inter Milan	v	Lazio

San Siro, Milan

== League and Cup (women's) ==
=== Serie A (women) ===
Pos	Team	Pld	W	D	L	GF	GA	GD	Pts	Qualification
1	Roma	6	6	0	0	21	7	+14	18	Qualification for the Champions League league phase
2	Inter Milan	6	5	1	0	13	0	+13	16	Qualification for the Champions League third qualifying round
3	Como 1907	6	3	2	1	13	11	+2	11	Qualification for the Champions League second qualifying round
4	Fiorentina	6	3	1	2	10	6	+4	10	
5	Juventus	6	3	0	3	12	14	−2	9	
6	FC Como	6	2	2	2	4	5	−1	8	
7	Ternana	6	2	1	3	5	11	−6	7	
8	Milan	6	2	0	4	8	13	−5	6	
9	Napoli	6	1	2	3	7	8	−1	5	
10	Parma	6	1	2	3	3	7	−4	5	
11	Lazio	6	0	3	3	1	7	−6	3	
12	Sassuolo	6	0	2	4	5	13	−8	2	Relegation to the Serie B

Updated to match(es) played on 8 November 2026. Source: Soccerway
Rules for classification: 1) Points; 2) Tiebreaker for the Champions League team and the relegated team; 3) Head-to-head points; 4) Head-to-head goal difference; 5) Goal difference; 6) Goals scored; 7) Draw

=== 2026 Serie A Women's Cup ===
==== Final ====
19 September 2026
18:00 CEST

Juventus	2–2 (a.e.t.)	Roma
Penalties
	4–2

Stadio Torquato Bresciani, Viareggio
