= Francesco Antonelli =

Francesco Antonelli may refer to:

- Franco Antonelli (1934–2022), Italian long-distance runner
- Francesco Antonelli (footballer) (born 1999), Italian footballer
