= Simone Potop =

Italian footballer

Personal information
- Date of birth: 15 January 2000 (age 26)
- Place of birth: Turin, Italy
- Height: 1.85 m (6 ft 1 in)
- Position: Defender

Team information
- Current team: AlbinoLeffe
- Number: 4

Youth career
- 2007–2020: Torino
- 2019–2020: → AC Milan (loan)

Senior career*
| Years | Team | Apps | (Gls) |
| 2020–2024 | Fiorenzuola | 102 | (1) |
| 2024– | AlbinoLeffe | 72 | (5) |
- * Club domestic league appearances and goals as of 20 September 2026

Simone Potop (born 15 January 2000) is an Italian professional footballer who plays as a defender for Serie C Group A club AlbinoLeffe, which he captains.

== Club career ==
=== Fiorenzuola ===
Simone made his senior debut for Fiorenzuola on 15 November 2020, in a 1–0 away victory over Seravezza Pozzi Calcio counting for the Serie D.

He made his Serie C debut on 28 August 2021 in a game against Feralpisalò.

On 5 July 2024, Potop moved to AlbinoLeffe.

== Career statistics ==
=== Club ===
As of match played 20 September 2026

Appearances and goals by club, season and competition
| Club | Season | League | | | National Cup (Note: Includes Coppa Italia and Coppa Italia Serie C) | | Europe | | Other | | Total | |
| Club | Season | Division | Apps | Goals | Apps | Goals | Apps | Goals | Apps | Goals | Apps | Goals |
|---|---|---|---|---|---|---|---|---|---|---|---|---|
| Fiorenzuola | 2020–21 | Serie D | 19 | 0 | 0 | 0 | — | | — | | 19 | 0 |
| Fiorenzuola | 2021–22 | Serie C | 25 | 0 | 1 | 0 | — | | — | | 26 | 0 |
| Fiorenzuola | 2022–23 | Serie C | 24 | 0 | 0 | 0 | — | | — | | 24 | 0 |
| Fiorenzuola | 2023–24 | Serie C | 34 | 1 | 0 | 0 | — | | 2 (Note: Appearances in Serie C-Relegation play-offs) | 0 | 36 | 1 |
| Fiorenzuola | Total | | 102 | 1 | 1 | 0 | — | | 2 | 0 | 105 | 1 |
| AlbinoLeffe | 2024–25 | Serie C | 31 | 2 | 2 | 0 | — | | 1 (Note: Appearances in Serie C-Promotion play-offs) | 0 | 34 | 2 |
| AlbinoLeffe | 2025–26 | Serie C | 35 | 3 | 1 | 0 | — | | — | | 36 | 3 |
| AlbinoLeffe | 2026–27 | Serie C | 6 | 0 | 1 | 0 | — | | — | | 7 | 0 |
| AlbinoLeffe | Total | | 72 | 5 | 4 | 0 | — | | 1 | 0 | 77 | 5 |
| Career Total | | | 174 | 6 | 5 | 0 | 0 | 0 | 3 | 0 | 182 | 6 |

== Honours ==
Fiorenzuola

- Serie D: 2020–21
