= Giacomo Benedetti =

Italian footballer (born 1999)

Personal information
- Date of birth: 8 March 1999 (age 27)
- Place of birth: Montepulciano, Italy
- Height: 1.75 m (5 ft 9 in)
- Position: Midfielder

Team information
- Current team: Trento
- Number: 8

Youth career
- Pianese

Senior career*
Years	Team	Apps	(Gls)
2017–2020	Pianese	85	(3)
2020–2024	Pontedera	132	(12)
2024–2025	Arzignano	33	(4)
2025–	Trento	34	(1)
- * Club domestic league appearances and goals as of 29 April 2026

Giacomo Benedetti (born 8 March 1999) is an Italian professional footballer who plays as a midfielder for Serie C Group A club Trento.

== Career ==
Born in Montepulciano, Benedetti started his career in Pianese youth sector, and was promoted to the first team on 2017–18 Serie D season. With the team, won the promotion to Serie C in 2018–19 Serie D, and he made his professional debut on 25 August 2019 against Pro Vercelli.

On 16 September 2020, he signed with Serie C club Pontedera. On 23 March 2021, he extended his contract with the club.

On 19 July 2024, Benedetti joined Arzignano Valchiampo on a two-season contract.
