= Marco Pilato =

Italian association football player

Personal information
- Date of birth: 14 April 1973
- Place of birth: Bologna, Italy
- Position(s): Goalkeeper

Senior career*
Years	Team	Apps	(Gls)
19??–1991	Bologna	6	(0)
1992	Trento	3	(0)
1993	Bologna	2	(0)
1993–1994	Centese	14	(0)
- *Club domestic league appearances and goals

Marco Pilato (born 14 April 1973 in Italy) is an Italian retired footballer.

== Career ==
At the age of 18, Pilato debuted for Bologna in the Serie A, where he was a reference point for future international goalkeeper Gianluigi Buffon. However, he retired from professional football at age 21 because he felt that "there was no respect, only money dominated, while application and the desire to learn were not considered". After that, Pilato played in the Bologna amateur leagues, operating as a defender, midfielder, or forward.
