= Stadio Briamasco =

Sports stadium located in Italy

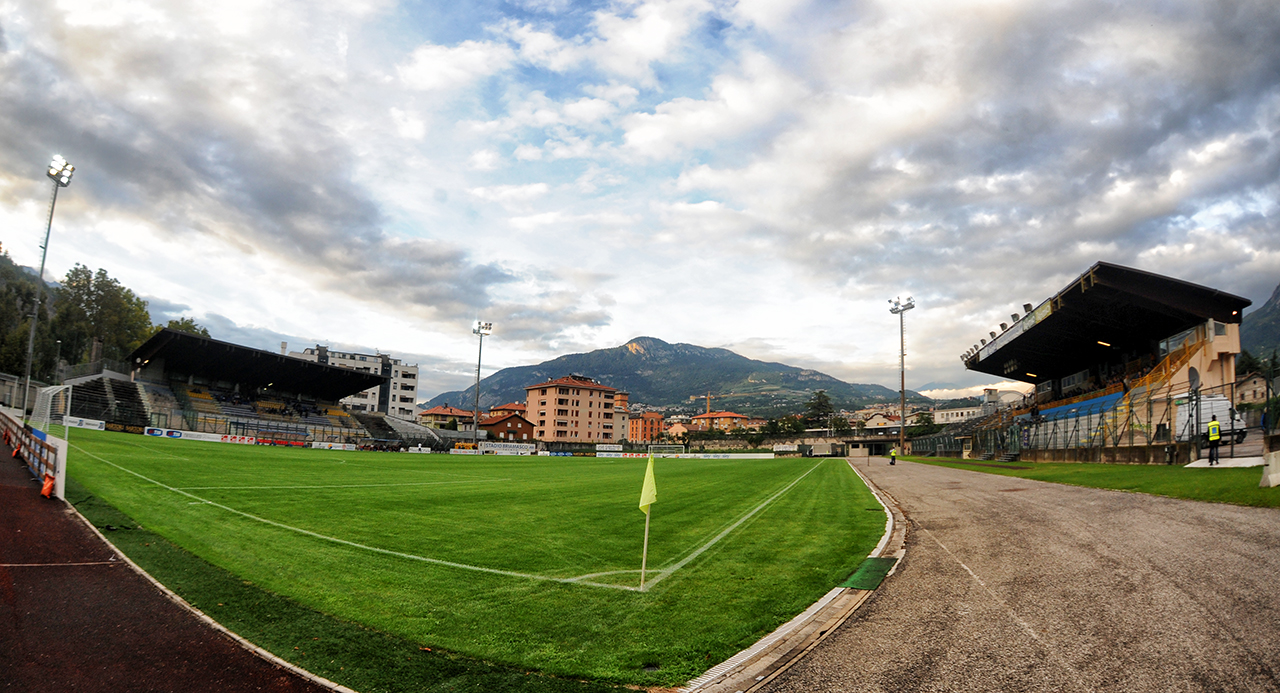
- Panoramic view of the stadium, 2014
- Interactive map of Stadio Briamasco
- Former names: Stadium (1922–19??)
- Address: Via Roberto da Sanseverino 41, 38122
- Location: Trento, Italy
- Coordinates: 46°03′51.16″N 11°06′51.53″E
- Owner: Comune di Trento
- Operator: ASIS Trento
- Capacity: 4,200
- Surface: Grass
- Field size: 105 m × 65 m (344 ft × 213 ft)

Construction
- Opened: September, 1922

Tenants
- Trento (1922–present); Mezzocorona (2008–2011)

Website
- Official website

Stadio Briamasco, previously known as Stadium, is a multi-use stadium in Trento, Italy. Owned by the city, it is primarily used for football and is the home ground of A.C. Trento 1921 S.S.D. The stadium is equipped with a six-lane athletics track and is also used as an archery and cycling venue.

Opened in September of 1922, during its entire existence the stadium has been the home venue of A.C. Trento 1921. It also hosted home matches for Mezzocorona from the 2008–09 to 2010–11 seasons and was the temporary home of Dro for one game in 2014. The Briamasco has hosted two matches of the Italy national under-21 football team. It has a listed seating capacity of 4,200.

== History ==
The Briamasco opened in 1922 and was originally named "Stadium" before later being renamed as the Stadio Briamasco.

In the summer of 2014, the natural grass field of the Briamasco was affected by an infestation of rabbits. The animals dug holes in the field, ate the grass, and provided "natural fertilization" to the field. The city planned to capture the rabbits using cages with bait or nets, then place fences and sound deterrents to keep them from returning.

During the COVID-19 pandemic in Italy, the Briamasco was closed to spectators and matches were held behind closed doors. The stadium was re-opened for a match against Campodarsego on 23 May 2021, with 750 fans allowed to attend. Trentino claimed victory in that game, mathematically sealing promotion to Serie C. However, promotion celebrations were pushed back to July to line up with the club's 100th anniversary celebrations.

=== Future plans ===
In 2013, a proposal was floated to replace the Briamasco with a new stadium in the Albere district of Trento. However, local politicians in the city said at the time that a lack of financial resources made such a move unlikely. The subject of a new stadium was again brought up in 2021, this time by Trento mayor Franco Ianeselli, following the club's promotion to Serie C. He stated that two possibilities existed: renovations to the Briamasco, or building a new stadium outside the city center. Ahead of the 2021–22 Serie C campaign, the city allocated €500,000 to renovate the stadium to the requirements of Serie C. All of the seats in the Briamasco were replaced, a new stand was built to increase capacity, a television tower was constructed, the lighting system was overhauled, and the pitch was replaced.

== Stands ==
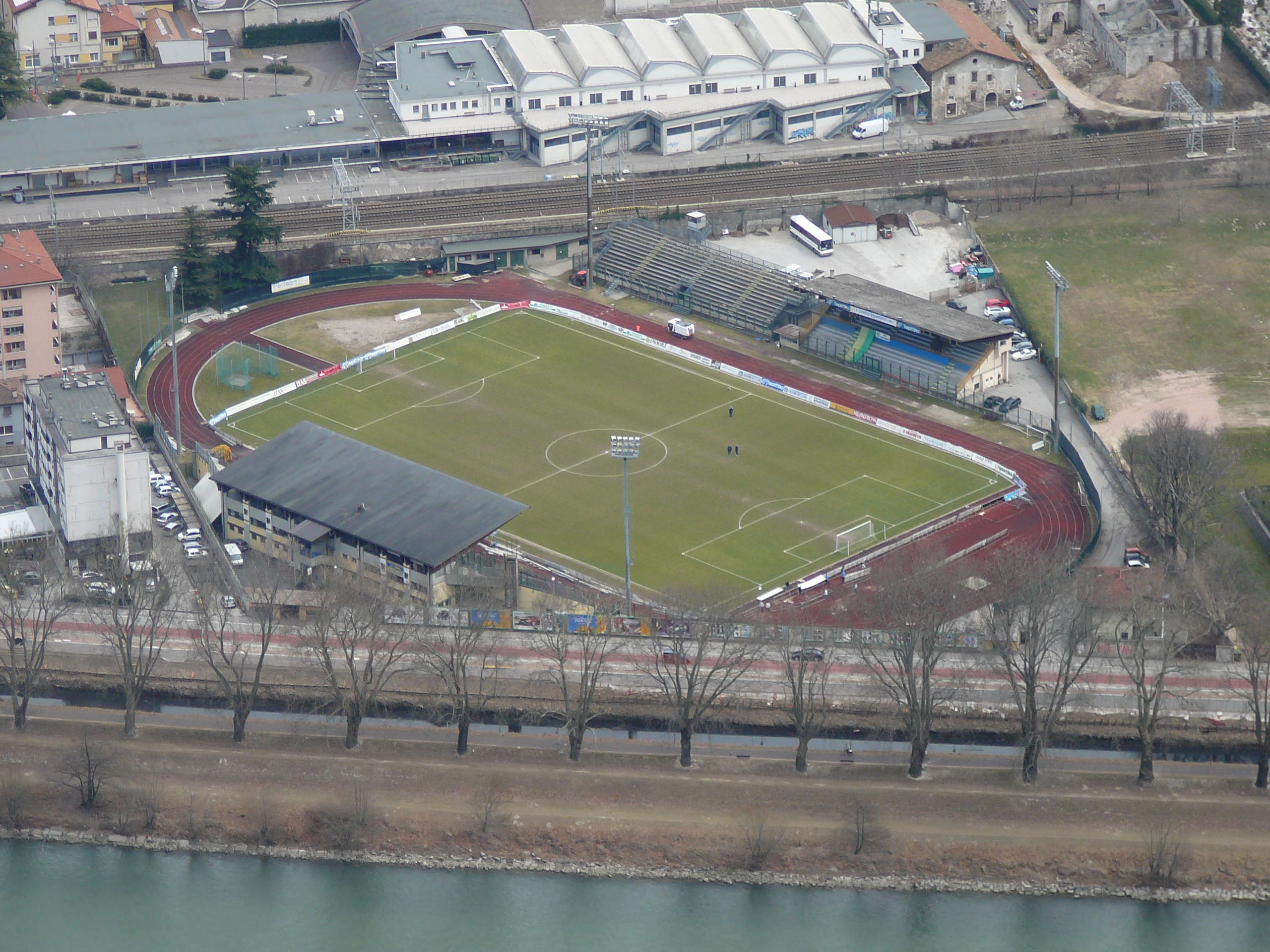
Overhead view of the stadium, 2009. The Tribuna Nord is at the bottom of the stadium, with the Sud and the supporters' curva at the top.

The Stadio Briamasco has two covered stands: the Tribuna Nord and Tribuna Sud, located on opposite sides of the field. The Nord, which has a capacity of 2,300 and contains the press box, is named after Giorgio Grigolli, a former president of Trentino-Alto Adige/Südtirol and Trentino. The Sud, with a capacity of 650, is named after former club president Ito Del Favero. Both stands were officially named on 29 April 2018 at halftime of a match against Dro, with city mayor Alessandro Andreatta and relatives of both men in attendance.

Trento supporters have a dedicated terrace, with a capacity for 1,000 fans, on the south side of the stadium. When this section was rebuilt in 2020, it was named the Curva Funivia; however, the club petitioned for a rename to the Curva Gunther Mair, after a former Trento goalkeeper who died in August 2020. The terrace is located on the corner of the stadium closest to the Via Roberto da Sanseverino.

== Other tenants ==
Twice, the Stadio Briamasco has hosted a match of the Italy national under-21 football team. The first match, a friendly against Sweden on 27 April 2004, saw the Azzurini claim a 4–0 victory. In the second, a 2009 UEFA European Under-21 Championship qualification Group 1 fixture against the Faroe Islands, Italy notched a 2–1 win on 6 September 2007.

From the 2008–09 to 2010–11 seasons, the Briamasco was the temporary home stadium for Mezzocorona. The club's Stadio Comunale did not meet requirements for Lega Pro Seconda Divisione venues. On 16 November 2014, the Briamasco hosted a Serie D match between Dro and Biancoscudati Padova. Dro's home ground, the Comunale Oltra, was deemed to be too small due to the number of traveling Padova supporters.

The Briamasco is frequently used as a site for preseason matches between other clubs, often teams from Serie A. For example, in the summer of 2018 the stadium hosted games between Napoli and Chievo, as well as Parma and Sampdoria.
