= List of mayors of Trento =

Mayor of Trento
- Sindaco di Trento

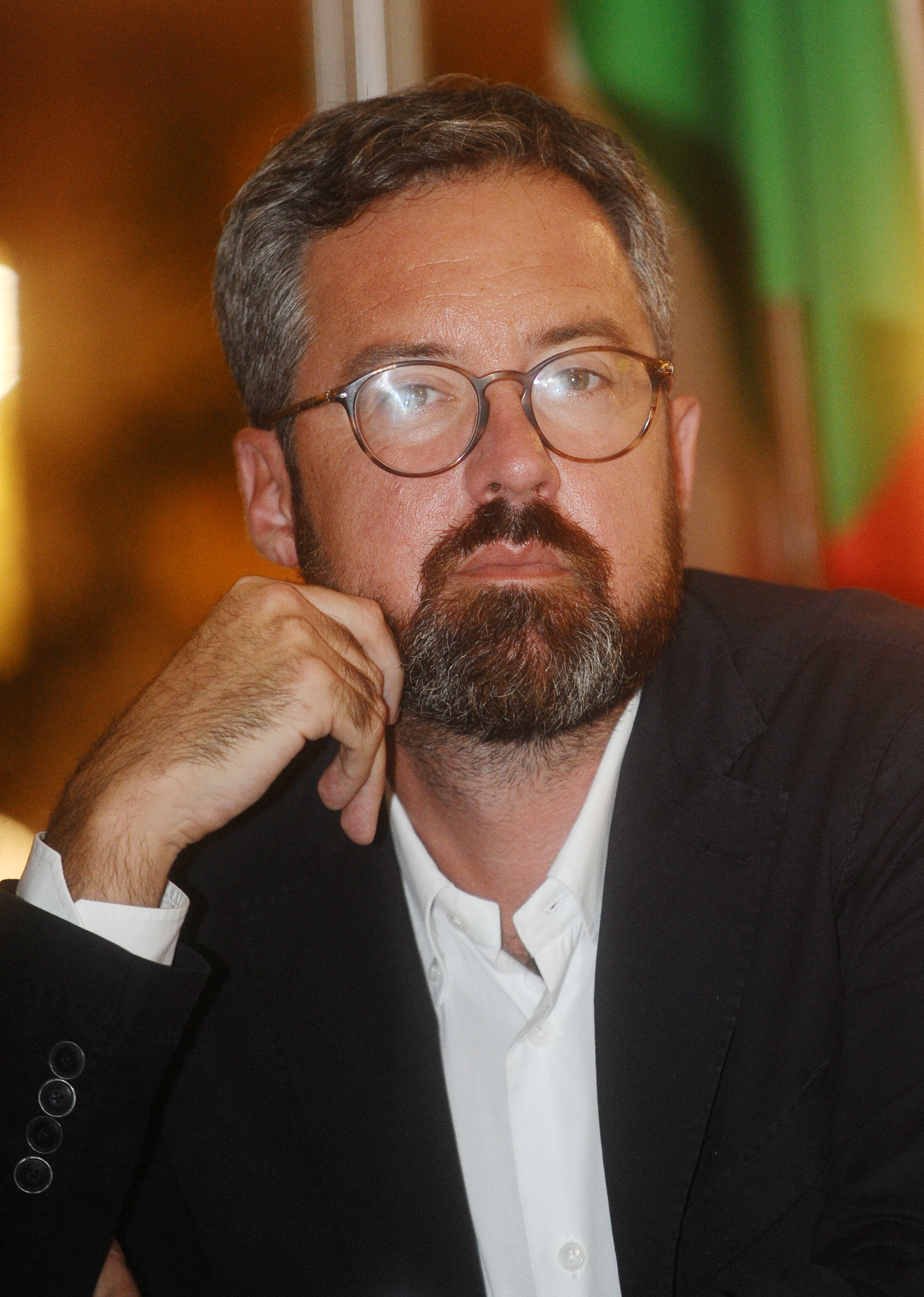
- Incumbent; Franco Ianeselli since 23 September 2020
- Appointer: Popular election
- Term length: 5 years, renewable once
- Website: Official website

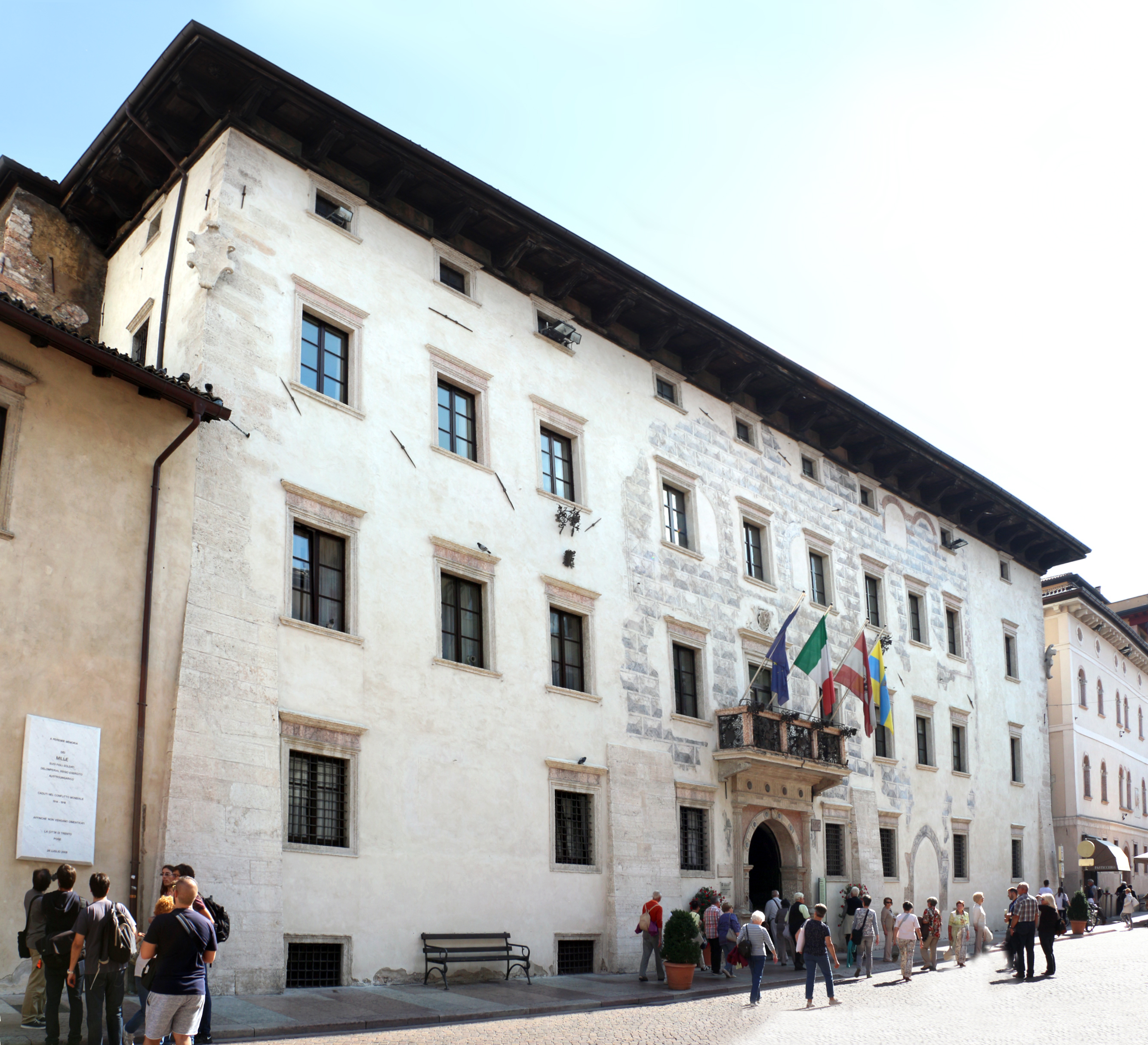
Trento's City Hall

The mayor of Trento is an elected politician who, along with the Trento's city council, is accountable for the strategic government of Trento in Trentino-Alto Adige/Südtirol, Italy, the capital city of the region.

The current mayor is the centre-left independent Franco Ianeselli, elected in September 2020.

== Overview ==
According to the Italian Constitution, the mayor of Trento is a member of the city council.

The mayor is elected by the population of Trento, who also elects the members of the city council, controlling the mayor's policy guidelines and is able to enforce his resignation by a motion of no confidence. The mayor is entitled to appoint and release the members of his government.

Since 1995 the mayor is elected directly by Trento's electorate: in all mayoral elections in Italy in cities with a population higher than 15,000 the voters express a direct choice for the mayor or an indirect choice voting for the party of the candidate's coalition. If no candidate receives at least 50% of votes, the top two candidates go to a second round after two weeks. The election of the City Council is based on a direct choice for the candidate with a preference vote: the candidate with the majority of the preferences is elected. The number of the seats for each party is determined proportionally.

== Republic of Italy (since 1946) ==
=== City Council election (1946–1995) ===
From 1946 to 1995, the Mayor of Trento was elected by the City Council.

	Mayor	Term start	Term end	Party
1	Tullio Odorizzi	21 September 1946	19 October 1948	DC
2	Dino Ziglio	19 October 1948	13 June 1951	DC
3	Nilo Piccoli	13 June 1951	15 July 1964	DC
4	Edo Benedetti	15 July 1964	14 January 1975	DC
5	Giorgio Tononi	14 January 1975	16 June 1983	DC
6	Adriano Goio	16 June 1983	15 June 1990	DC
7	Lorenzo Dellai	15 June 1990	4 June 1995	DC

=== Direct election (since 1995) ===
Since 1995, under provisions of new local administration law, the Mayor of Trento is chosen by direct election.

	Mayor	Took office	Left office	Party	Coalition	Election
(7)	Lorenzo Dellai (b. 1959)	4 June 1995	2 October 1998 (Note: Resigned in order to participate in the regional election.)	PPI	PPI • PDS • PdD • FdV	1995
8	Alberto Pacher (b. 1956)	2 October 1998 (Note: Acting as deputy mayor.)	16 May 1999	DS; PD	PPI • PDS • PdD • FdV	1995
8	Alberto Pacher (b. 1956)	16 May 1999	8 May 2005	DS; PD	DS • DL • SDI • FdV	1999 (special)
8	Alberto Pacher (b. 1956)	8 May 2005	25 September 2008 (Note: Resigned in order to participate in the regional election.)	DS; PD	DS • DL • SDI • FdV • PATT	2005
9	Alessandro Andreatta (b. 1957)	25 September 2008 (Note: Acting as deputy mayor.)	3 May 2009	PD	DS • DL • SDI • FdV • PATT	2005
9	Alessandro Andreatta (b. 1957)	3 May 2009	10 May 2015	PD	PD • PATT • UpT	2009 (special)
9	Alessandro Andreatta (b. 1957)	10 May 2015	23 September 2020	PD	PD • PATT • FdV and leftist lists	2015
10	Franco Ianeselli (b. 1978)	23 September 2020 (Note: Election originally scheduled for May 2020 then postponed due to the coronavirus pandemic.)	12 May 2025	Ind	PD • PATT • EV • A • +E and leftist lists	2020
10	Franco Ianeselli (b. 1978)	12 May 2025	Incumbent	Ind	PD • CB • AVS and leftist lists	2025
