= Fabio Castellano =

Italian professional footballer

Personal information
- Date of birth: 14 March 1998 (age 28)
- Place of birth: Milan, Italy
- Height: 1.86 m (6 ft 1 in)
- Position: Midfielder

Team information
- Current team: Folgore Caratese
- Number: 8

Youth career
- Atalanta

Senior career*
Years	Team	Apps	(Gls)
2016–2017	Atalanta	0	(0)
2016–2017	→ Pro Vercelli (loan)	2	(0)
2017–2019	Ascoli	3	(0)
2018–2019	→ Juve Stabia (loan)	10	(0)
2019–2021	Alessandria	39	(2)
2021	Livorno	17	(1)
2021–2022	Padova	0	(0)
2021–2022	→ Pistoiese (loan)	26	(0)
2022–2023	Imolese	11	(0)
2023	→ Fidelis Andria (loan)	8	(1)
2024	Chieti	17	(0)
2024–2025	Turris	13	(1)
2025–	Folgore Caratese	32	(1)

International career
2013	Italy U15	8	(0)
2013–2014	Italy U16	5	(0)
2014–2015	Italy U17	4	(0)
2015–2016	Italy U18	7	(0)
2016	Italy U19	3	(0)
- * Club domestic league appearances and goals as of 18 December 2024

Fabio Castellano (born 14 March 1998) is an Italian professional footballer who plays as a midfielder for Folgore Caratese.

Castellano began his footballing career with Atalanta, who he joined at the age of six, but never played for the club at senior level, instead making his professional debut while on loan at Pro Vercelli before signing for Ascoli in 2017.

== Club career ==
=== Atalanta ===
Fabio Castellano is an academy graduate of Atalanta, having joined the club when he was just six years old. In 2014, he was the subject of great media coverage after he rejected offers from Manchester United, Chelsea, Inter, and AC Milan in order to remain with Atalanta.

==== Loan to Pro Vercelli ====
In July 2016, Serie B side Pro Vercelli confirmed the loan signing of Castellano. He made his debut for the club on 22 October, coming on as an 80th minute substitute for Simone Emmanuello in a 3–0 loss to Hellas Verona. In January 2017, reports circulated that Atalanta had reached an agreement with Juventus for the sale of Castellano, with the player to remain with Pro Vercelli for the remainder of the season. It was later revealed, however, that Atalanta and Juventus had failed to submit the requisite documents before the transfer market had closed. His only other appearance, which also marked his first professional start, came on the final day of the season in a 2–1 defeat to Frosinone which saw Pro Vercelli end the campaign in 17th position, narrowly avoiding relegation.

=== Ascoli ===
On 30 August 2017, Castellano signed for Serie B side Ascoli on a three-year contract. He made his debut for the club on 17 March 2018, coming on as a late substitute in a 2–1 win over Ternana.

==== Loan to Juve Stabia ====
On 29 August 2018, he joined Serie C club Juve Stabia on loan for the 2018–19 season.

=== Alessandria ===
On 15 July 2019, he signed a 2-year contract with Serie C club Alessandria.

=== Livorno ===
On 1 February 2021, he moved to Livorno.

=== Pistoiese ===
On 25 August 2021 he joined Padova, and was loaned to Pistoiese.

=== Imolese ===
==== Loan to Fidelis Andria ====
On 31 January 2023, Castellano was loaned by Fidelis Andria.

== International career ==
=== Italy national youth teams ===
Castellano has represented Italy across various youth levels. He made his debut for the Italy U18 side alongside Atalanta teammate Simone Mazzocchi on 13 August 2015 in a 0–0 draw with Bulgaria.

== Career statistics ==
=== Club ===
As of match played 9 October 2021

Appearances and goals by club, season and competition
Club	Season	League			Cup		Other		Total	
Club	Season	League	Apps	Goals	Apps	Goals	Apps	Goals	Apps	Goals
Pro Vercelli (loan)	2016–17	Serie B	2	0	-		-		2	0
Ascoli	2017–18	Serie B	3	0	-		-		3	0
Juve Stabia (loan)	2018–19	Serie C	8	0	-		3 (Note: Two appearances in Coppa Italia Serie C, one appearance in Supercoppa di Serie C)	0	11	0
Alessandria	2019–20	Serie C	22	0	1	0	2 (Note: Appearance(s) in Coppa Italia Serie C)	0	25	0
Alessandria	2020–21	Serie C	17	2	2	0	-		19	2
Alessandria	Ttotal		13	0	3	0	2	0	44	0
Livorno	2020–21	Serie C	17	1	-		-		17	1
Pistoiese (loan)	2021–22	Serie C	7	0	-		-		7	0
Career total			76	3	3	0	5	0	84	3
