= Luca Tabbiani =

Italian football coach (born 1979)

Personal information
- Date of birth: February 13, 1979 (age 47)
- Place of birth: Genoa, Italy
- Height: 1.78 m (5 ft 10 in)
- Position: Midfielder

Team information
- Current team: Trento (head coach)

Youth career
- 1996–1998: Genoa

Senior career*
Years	Team	Apps	(Gls)
1998–2000	Genoa	13	(0)
2000–2001	Mestre	26	(5)
2001–2002	Trento	23	(5)
2002–2006	Cremonese	118	(12)
2006–2008	Bari	47	(3)
2008–2010	Triestina	62	(3)
2010–2011	Pisa	15	(1)
2011–2012	Lecco	31	(0)
2012–2014	Sestri Levante	43	(8)

Managerial career
- 2015: Vado
- 2016–2017: Lavagnese
- 2017: Savona
- 2018–2019: Lavagnese
- 2019–2023: Fiorenzuola
- 2023: Catania
- 2024: Fiorenzuola
- 2024–: Trento
- * Club domestic league appearances and goals

Luca Tabbiani (born 13 February 1979) is an Italian football coach and a former professional footballer. He is the head coach of Serie C Group A club Trento.

== Coaching career ==
On 5 November 2017, he was dismissed from Savona.

On 11 May 2018, he returned to Lavagnese in Serie D.

On 17 June 2019, he was hired by Serie D club Fiorenzuola. He was confirmed as Fiorenzuola manager after guiding them to promotion in the 2020–21 Serie D season.

After two positive seasons with Fiorenzuola in the Serie C league, on 16 June 2023, Tabbiani was hired as the new head coach of ambitious newly-promoted Serie C club Catania. He was dismissed on 5 November 2023 following a lacklustre start to the season.

On 1 January 2024, Tabbiani agreed to return to Fiorenzuola until the end of the 2023–24 Serie C season. After failing to save Fiorenzuola from relegation, in June 2024 he left the club to sign a one-year deal with fellow Serie C club Trento.

== Honours ==
=== Coach ===
Fiorenzuola

- Serie D: 2020–21 (Group D)
