= Andrea Trainotti =

Italian footballer (born 1993)

Personal information
- Full name: Andrea Trainotti
- Date of birth: 27 November 1993 (age 32)
- Place of birth: Rovereto, Italy
- Height: 1.84 m (6 ft 0 in)
- Position: Centre-back

Team information
- Current team: Trento
- Number: 4

Senior career*
Years	Team	Apps	(Gls)
2010–2011	ASD Alense	27	(1)
2011–2014	Virtus Verona	96	(5)
2014–2016	Mantova	56	(4)
2017	Bassano	8	(0)
2017–2018	Monza	17	(1)
2018–2019	Virtus Verona	33	(1)
2019–	Trento	154	(3)
- * Club domestic league appearances and goals as of 29 April 2026

Andrea Trainotti (born 27 November 1993) is an Italian professional footballer who plays as a centre-back back for Serie C Group A club Trento.

== Club career ==
Born in Rovereto, Trainotti made his senior debut for Eccellenza club ASD Alense in the 2010–11 season. In 2011 he joined Serie D club Virtus Verona. Trainotti signed for Mantova in 2014, playing for two seasons.

On 9 January 2017, he joined Monza. Trainotti returned to Virtus Verona on 26 June 2018. On 20 September 2019, he signed for Eccellenza club Trento, helping them gain consecutive promotions to Serie D and Serie C.
