= Alessandro Andreatta =

Italian politician

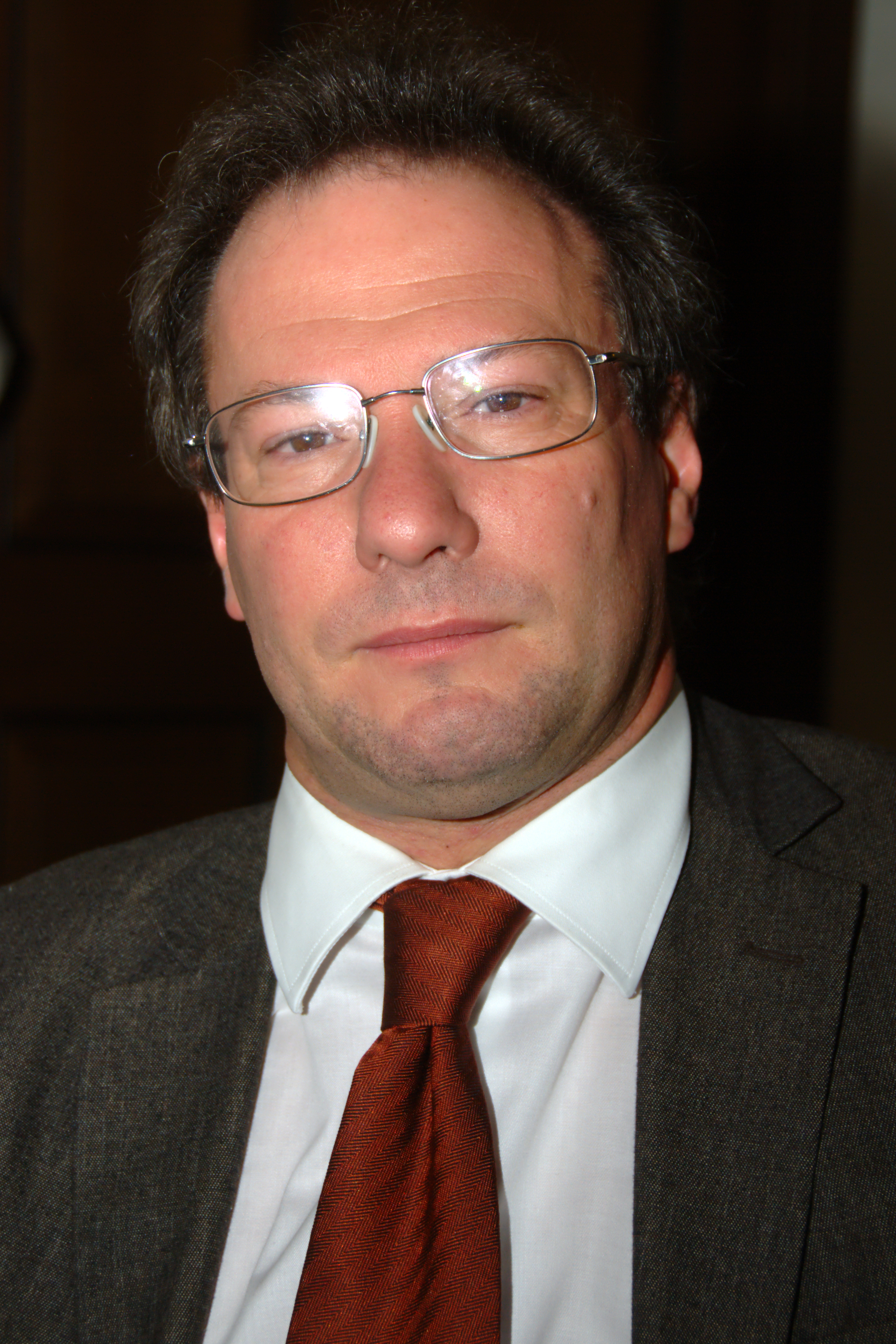

Mayor of Trento
- In office 3 May 2009 – 23 September 2020
- Preceded by: Alberto Pacher
- Succeeded by: Franco Ianeselli

Personal details
- Born: 4 February 1957 (age 69) Trento, Trentino-Alto Adige, Italy
- Party: Democratic Party
- Education: University of Padua
- Profession: Teacher

Alessandro Andreatta (born 4 February 1957 in Trento) is an Italian politician.

== Biography ==
In 1995, he was elected city councilor in Trento. In 1998, he was appointed city councilor for urban planning, private construction, and toponymy in the ranks of the Popular Democrats. On May 8, 2005, he became deputy mayor for the Daisy Civic List party.

In January 2008, he was reported for Fraud and abuse of office by Eugenio Martini, owner of the “Auto In” car dealership in Gardolo. Andreatta was entered in the register of suspects for fraud but all charges were subsequently dismissed.

When Mayor Alberto Pacher resigned on September 25, 2008, Andreatta replaced him as acting mayor.

Andreatta won the Centre-left politics (Democratic Party (Italy), Union for Trentino, Trentino Tyrolean Autonomist Party, Union of Christian and Center Democrats, and other minor parties) held on February 22, 2009, to select the candidate for mayor of Trento. He obtained 55.54% of the votes: 3,740 votes out of 6,780 voters, obtaining a majority in 11 of the 12 constituencies (all except Povo). He defeated Claudio Bortolotti (34.78%), Aldo Pompermaier (7.22%, supported by the Federation of the Greens), and Paolo Chiariello (2.47%, Italia dei Valori and Leali al Trentino).

The elections were held on May 3, 2009, and Andreatta won in the first round (confirming predictions) with 33,468 votes (64.42%). His main opponent, Pino Morandini, supported by The People of Freedom and Civica Morandini parties, obtained about 21%. Turnout was 60.12%, down by about ten points compared to the previous local elections.

In the local elections held on May 10, 2015, Andreatta was re-elected mayor of Trento, leading a center-left coalition, with 53.7% of the vote, defeating center-right candidate Claudio Cia, who obtained 31.03% of the vote.

Since September 2020, he has returned to teaching Italian language and Latin at the Liceo Classico Arcivescovile Trento high school.

== Career ==
He is a member of the Democratic Party and was elected Mayor of Trento at the 2009 Italian local elections|2009 local elections. He took office on 3 May 2009. Andreatta was re-elected for a second term in 2015.

== See also ==
- 2009 Italian local elections
- 2015 Italian local elections
- List of mayors of Trento

Political offices
Preceded by Alberto Pacher	Mayor of Trento; 2009–2020	Succeeded by Franco Ianeselli
