= Franco Ianeselli =

Italian trade unionist and politician

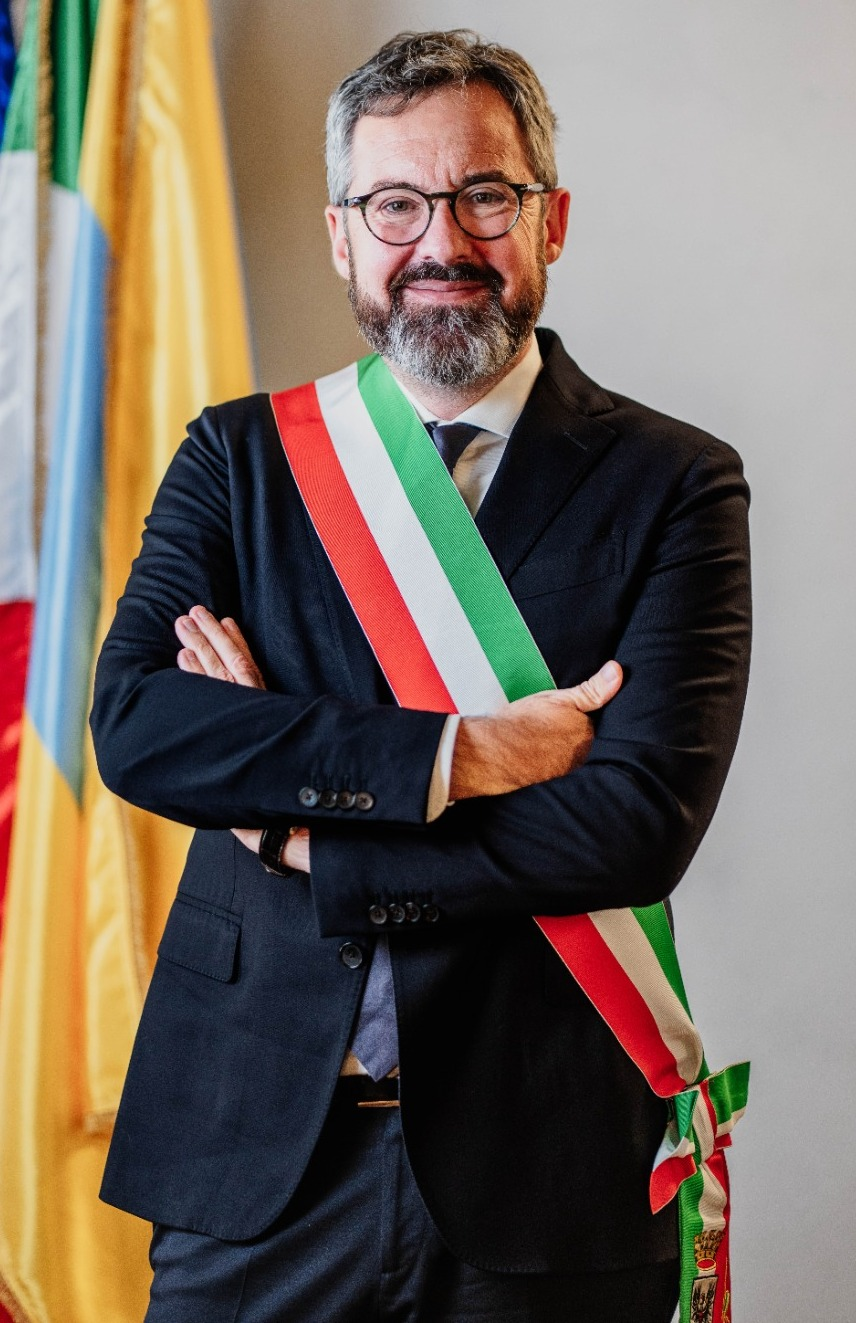

Mayor of Trento
- Incumbent
- Assumed office 23 September 2020
- Preceded by: Alessandro Andreatta

Personal details
- Born: 5 August 1978 (age 47) Trento, Trentino-Alto Adige, Italy
- Party: Centre-left independent
- Education: University of Trento
- Profession: Trade unionist

Franco Ianeselli (5 August 1978) is an Italian politician and former trade unionist, mayor of Trento since 2020.

== Career ==
From 2015 to 2020 he was general secretary of CGIL of Trentino.

At the 2020 Italian local elections he was elected Mayor of Trento with a centre-left coalition, and took office on 23 September 2020.

Political offices
Preceded by Alessandro Andreatta	Mayor of Trento since 2020	Incumbent
