= Francesco Antonelli (footballer) =

Italian footballer

Personal information
- Date of birth: 22 July 1999 (age 27)
- Place of birth: Rome, Italy
- Height: 1.85 m (6 ft 1 in)
- Position: Midfielder

Team information
- Current team: Desenzano Calvina

Youth career
- –2017: Sambenedettese

Senior career*
Years	Team	Apps	(Gls)
2017–2018	Sambenedettese	0	(0)
2017–2018	→ Porto D'Ascoli (loan)	29	(3)
2018–2019	Campobasso	33	(1)
2019–2022	Legnago Salus	98	(9)
2022–2023	Lumezzane	35	(9)
2023–2024	Cavese	24	(1)
2024–	Desenzano Calvina	0	(0)
- * Club domestic league appearances and goals as of 5 May 2024

Francesco Antonelli (born 22 July 1999) is an Italian professional footballer who plays as a midfielder for Serie D club Desenzano Calvina.
