= US Folgore Caratese ASD =

Italian football club

Folgore Caratese
- Full name: Unione Sportiva Folgore Caratese; Associazione Sportiva Dilettantistica
- Founded: 2011; 15 years ago
- Ground: Stadio XXV Aprile, Carate Brianza
- Capacity: 3,210
- Chairman: Michele Criscitiello
- Manager: Nicola Belmonte
- League: Serie C Group A
- 2025–26: Serie D Group B, 1st of 18 (promoted)
Home colours	Away colours

U.S. Folgore Caratese A.S.D. is an Italian association football club, based in Carate Brianza which currently plays in Serie C Group A.

== History ==
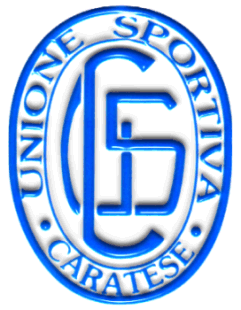
Old Caratese logo

The club was founded in 2011 after the merger of U.S. Folgore Verano (founded in 1951 and playing in Eccellenza) and U.S. Caratese (founded in 1908 and playing in Serie D). The most notable former player of Caratese has been Moreno Torricelli.

Folgore Caratese was formerly a satellite team of Novara Calcio. The club serves as a training side for Novara's young talents.

Folgore Caratese has been chaired since 2023, and formerly from 2016 to 2022, by journalist Michele Criscitiello, who is also editor-in-chief and co-owner of sports TV channel Sportitalia, the latter serving also as the official club sponsor during the period.

== Current squad ==
As of 29 September 2026.

Note: Flags indicate national team as defined under FIFA eligibility rules; some limited exceptions apply. Players may hold more than one non-FIFA nationality.

No.	Pos.	Nation	Player
1	GK	ITA	Daniel Salvalaggio
4	DF	ITA	Niccolò Samotti
5	DF	ITA	Stefano Marchetti
6	MF	ALB	Emanuele Ndoj
7	MF	ITA	Stefano Cester
8	MF	ITA	Fabio Castellano
9	FW	ITA	Samuele Spalluto
10	FW	ITA	Alessio Vacca (on loan from Juventus)
11	DF	ITA	Marco Balzano
12	GK	ITA	Mirko Castelnuovo
14	FW	ITA	Riccardo Guidi
16	MF	ITA	Filippo Campani
18	MF	ITA	Michele Ambrosini

No.	Pos.	Nation	Player
19	DF	ITA	Tommaso Duca
21	DF	ALB	Ertijon Gega
24	DF	ITA	Edoardo Bellia
25	DF	ITA	Michelangelo Benvenuto
28	MF	ITA	Leonardo Pedicillo
29	DF	ITA	Francesco Minerva
43	DF	ITA	Alessandro Bassino (on loan from Juventus)
61	FW	ITA	Andrea Santarcangelo (on loan from Casarano)
72	MF	ITA	Matteo Vignoli (on loan from Avellino)
77	FW	LAT	Kristiāns Mežsargs (on loan from Como)
80	MF	ITA	Flavio Di Dio
92	MF	ITA	Andrea Tessiore (on loan from Guidonia)
99	MF	ITA	Felice D'Amico

=== Out on loan ===
Note: Flags indicate national team as defined under FIFA eligibility rules; some limited exceptions apply. Players may hold more than one non-FIFA nationality.

No.	Pos.	Nation	Player
—	DF	ITA	Antonio Manzo (at Obermais until 30 June 2027)
—	DF	ITA	Davide Martellotta (at Francavilla until 30 June 2027)

No.	Pos.	Nation	Player
—	FW	ITA	Brando Ciravegna (at San Donato Tavarnelle until 30 June 2027)

== Colors and badge ==
The team's colors are blue with white border.

== Stadium ==
It plays at the Stadio XXV Aprile in Carate Brianza, which has a capacity of 3,000.
