= AC Trento 1921 =

Italian football club

- Full name: Associazione Calcio Trento 1921 S.r.l.
- Nicknames: Aquilotti (Little Eagles); I Gialloblù (The Yellow-Blues)
- Founded: 1921; 105 years ago 1923 (refounded); 1925 (refounded); 1929 (refounded); 1930 (refounded); 1937 (refounded); 2004 (refounded); 2014 (refounded)
- Ground: Stadio Briamasco
- Capacity: 4,200
- Manager: Mauro Giacca
- Coach: Luca Tabbiani
- League: Serie C Group A
- 2025–26: Serie C Group A, 5th of 20
- Website: actrento.com
Home colours	Away colours	Third colours

Associazione Calcio Trento 1921 S.r.l., commonly known as AC Trento or Trento (pronounced [ˈtrento]), is an Italian football club based in Trento, Trentino-Alto Adige/Südtirol, who compete in Serie C, the third tier of the Italian football league system.

In 2014 Società Sportiva Dilettantistica Trento Calcio 1921 S.r.l. went bankrupt. The sports title was transferred to A.C. Trento S.C.S.D.

== History ==
=== Foundation ===
The club was founded in 1921.

The team took part to the 1945–46 Serie B–C season.

It in the season 2010–11, from Serie D group B relegated, in the play-out, to Eccellenza Trentino-Alto Adige/Südtirol.

In the season 2011–12 the team was promoted from Eccellenza Trentino–South Tyrol to Serie D after playoffs. The team was relegated again in 2013.

In 2014 Trento was relegated from Eccellenza to Promozione. After the transfer of the sports title to a new company in the same year, the phoenix club won promotion back to Eccellenza in 2016.

In the 2020–21 Serie D season, under the tenure of head coach Carmine Parlato, Trento were crowned Girone C champions, thus returning into professionalism after 18 years in the amateur leagues.

== Colors and badge ==
=== Colors ===
The official colors are yellow and blue. They are also the colors of the city of Trento.
The home jerseys of the club include the colors yellow and blue and can be vertically striped depending on the season. The away jerseys are mostly white or black.

=== Badge ===
The badge of the club has the form of a shield. The left half of the logo in the background is blue, the other half yellow. They represent the colors of the club and the city of Trento. In the middle of the badge an eagle is depicted, which is also the coat of arms of Trento. Above the eagle is the inscription "A.C. TRENTO". The founding year "1921" is shown below the eagle.

== Stadium ==
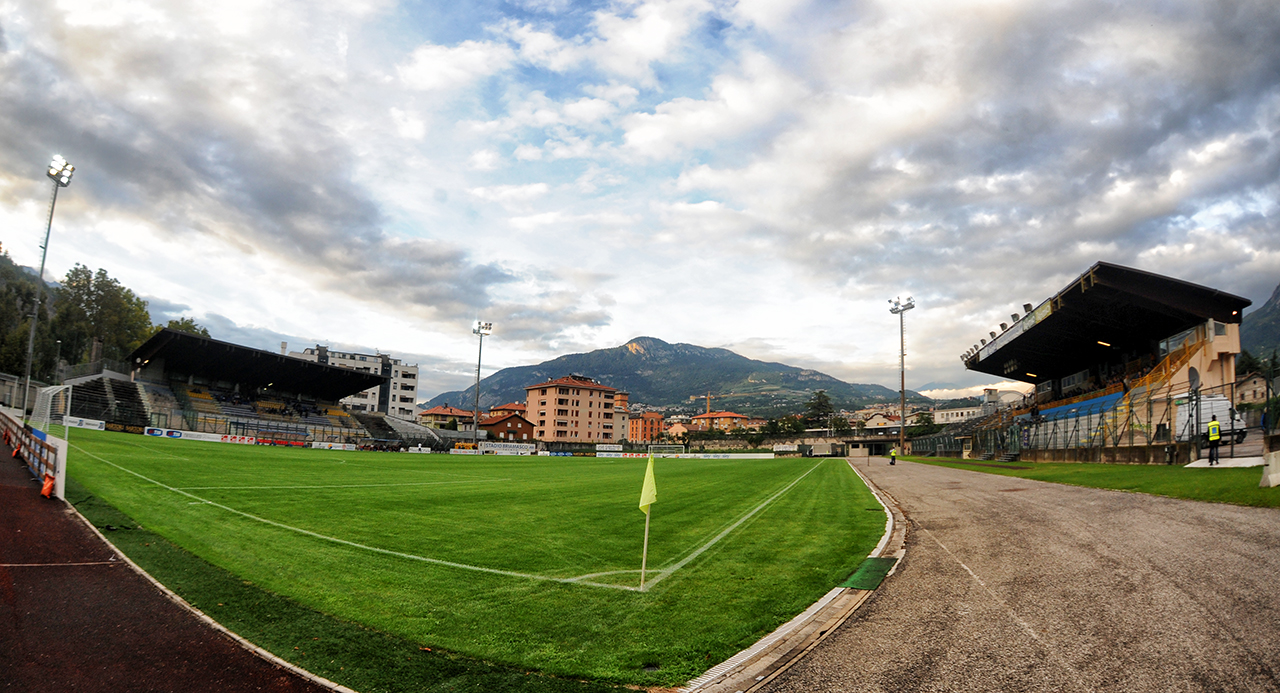
Stadio Briamasco in Trento

AC Trento plays his home games at Stadio Briamasco. The stadium was opened in 1922 and has a capacity of 4,200 spectators. In the meantime, the stadium was often slightly modernized. The dimensions of the field are 105 by 65 meters (344 by 213 ft) and it is played on natural turf pitch. It consists of north (Tribuna Nord) and south tribune (Tribuna Sud). The north tribune is mostly covered and the south tribune only half. In addition, the arena has an athletics system, which is no longer used.

Two international matches of the Italy U21 team were played in the Stadio Briamasco.

== Current squad ==
As of 27 August 2026

Note: Flags indicate national team as defined under FIFA eligibility rules; some limited exceptions apply. Players may hold more than one non-FIFA nationality.

No.	Pos.	Nation	Player
1	GK	ITA	Sergio Barlocco
3	DF	ITA	Roberto D'Intino (on loan from Parma)
4	DF	ITA	Andrea Trainotti (captain)
5	DF	ITA	Sheriff Kassama
6	MF	ITA	Marco Fossati
7	MF	ITA	Nicola Dalmonte
8	MF	ITA	Giacomo Benedetti
9	FW	ARG	Juan Ignacio Molina (on loan from Salernitana)
10	FW	ITA	Christian Capone
11	FW	ITA	Federico Accornero (on loan from Carrarese)
12	GK	ITA	Leonardo Santer
14	MF	ITA	Andrea Sodero
18	DF	ITA	Francesco Benassai
19	DF	ALB	Zylyf Muça

No.	Pos.	Nation	Player
21	FW	ITA	Marco Ladisa (on loan from Venezia)
22	GK	ITA	Emilio Goller
23	MF	ITA	Christian Aucelli
25	MF	ITA	Amer Mehić
27	DF	ITA	Filippo Frison
29	DF	ITA	Riccardo Fiamozzi
37	MF	ITA	Aldo Genco
44	DF	ITA	Mattia Maffei
66	MF	ITA	Matteo Castelli
70	DF	ITA	Gabriele Calzà
73	MF	ITA	Jacopo Grossi (on loan from Genoa)
80	MF	ITA	Marco Garetto
95	FW	ITA	Federico Caia
99	FW	ITA	Francesco Sartori

== Fans ==
The First organized group was founded in 1978 and was called "Ultras Trento 1978". In the 1990s the group was divided into three different groups: Trento Club (that reached up to 500 subscribers), Fedelissimi Gialloblù and the Ultras.

== Notable players ==
- (Italy) Daniele Balli
- (Italy) Luigi De Agostini
- (Italy) Angelo Domenghini
- (Italy) Giuseppe Sannino
- (Italy) Giuseppe Signori
- (Italy) Attilio Tesser
- (Italy) Francesco Toldo
- (Italy) Marco Pilato
- (Italy) Gianluca Piaccitali
- (Italy) Roberto De Zerbi
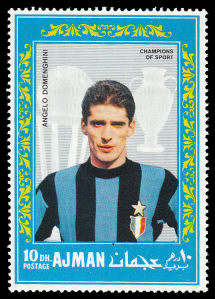
Angelo Domenghini in Internazionale colors

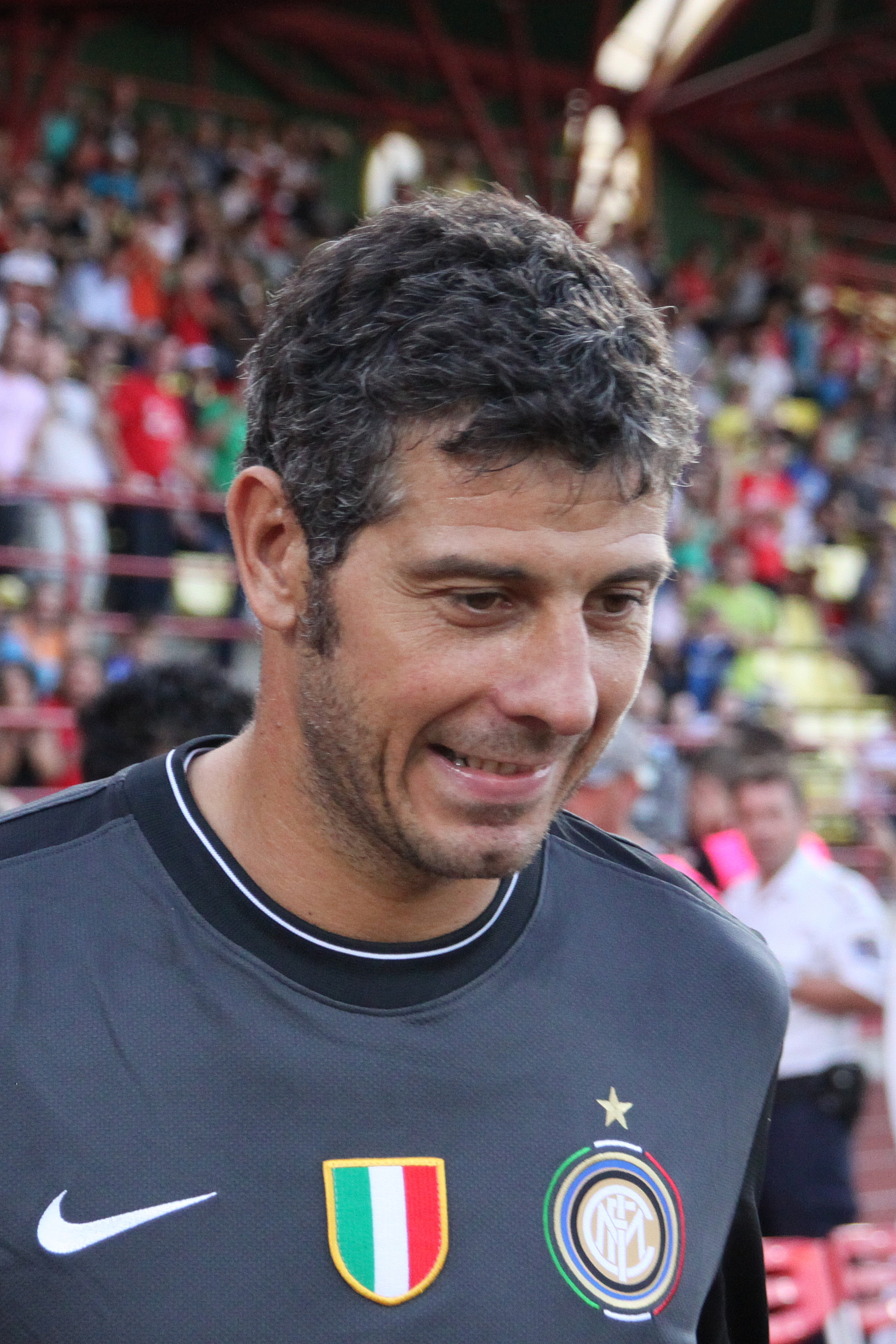
Francesco Toldo in Internazionale colors

== Notable managers ==
- (Hungary) Ferenc Hirzer
- (Italy) Enzo Robotti
