= 2023–24 Rimini FC 1912 season =

Rimini FC 1912
2023–24 season
- Manager: Gabriel Raimondi (until 10 October); Emanuele Troise (from 11 October)
- Stadium: Stadio Romeo Neri
- Serie C Group B: 10th
- Promotion play-offs: First round
- Coppa Italia Serie C: Semi-finals
- Top goalscorer: League: Claudio Morra (19); All: Claudio Morra (20)
- Highest home attendance: 4,006 vs Juventus Next Gen
- Lowest home attendance: 561 vs Perugia
- Biggest win: Rimini 2–0 Lucchese
- Biggest defeat: Pontedera 4–0 Rimini

The 2023–24 season was Rimini FC 1912's 112th season in existence and second consecutive season in the Serie C. They also competed in the Coppa Italia Serie C.

== Players ==
=== First-team squad ===
As of 6 September 2023

Note: Flags indicate national team as defined under FIFA eligibility rules; some limited exceptions apply. Players may hold more than one non-FIFA nationality.

No.	Pos.	Nation	Player
1	GK	ITA	Pietro Passador (on loan from Torino)
4	DF	ITA	Nicola Pietrangeli
6	DF	ITA	Matteo Gorelli
8	MF	ITA	Andrea Delcarro
9	FW	ITA	Claudio Morra
11	FW	ITA	Iacopo Cernigoi
12	GK	ALB	Cristian Jashari (on loan from Sassuolo)
13	DF	ITA	Niccolò Tofanari
14	DF	ITA	Luca Stanga (on loan from Lecco)
15	DF	ITA	Nicolò Gigli
20	FW	ITA	Diego Accursi
21	MF	ITA	Lorenzo Cherubini
22	GK	SMR	Edoardo Colombo
23	MF	LTU	Linas Mėgelaitis
25	MF	ITA	Alessandro Lombardi
28	DF	ROU	Alessandro Nastase

No.	Pos.	Nation	Player
29	DF	CIV	Evan Bouabre (on loan from Frosinone)
30	FW	ITA	Lorenzo Didio
37	MF	ITA	Davide Acampa
44	FW	ITA	Daniele Iacoponi (on loan from Parma)
67	MF	ITA	Samuele Rosini
70	MF	ITA	Mattia Leoncini
73	FW	ITA	Davide Lamesta
77	FW	ITA	Alessandro Selvini (on loan from Frosinone)
—	DF	ITA	Nicholas Allievi
—	DF	ITA	Tomas Lepri
—	DF	ITA	Francesco Semeraro
—	MF	ITA	Christian Langella
—	MF	ITA	Dion Ruffo Luci
—	MF	ITA	Federico Marchesi
—	FW	ITA	Gabriele Capanni (on loan from Ternana)
—	FW	ITA	Leonardo Ubaldi

== Transfers ==
=== In ===
Pos.	Player	Transferred from	Fee	Date	Source
MF	(Italy) Davide Lamesta	(Italy) Alessandria	€30,000	8 August 2023	
MF	(Lithuania) Linas Mėgelaitis	(Italy) Viterbese	Free	11 August 2023	
FW	(Italy) Claudio Morra	(Italy) Piacenza	Free	14 August 2023	

=== Out ===
Pos.	Player	Transferred to	Fee	Date	Source

== Pre-season and friendlies ==
Win Draw Loss Fixtures

12 August 2023 Friendly	Rimini (Italy)	0–1	(Albania) Dinamo Tirana	Santarcangelo di Romagna
17:30 CEST (UTC+2)				Stadium: Stadio comunale “Valentino Mazzola”

17 August 2023 Friendly	Verucchio (Italy)	0–6	(Italy) Rimini	Verucchio
20:30 CEST (UTC+2)		Report		Stadium: Stadio comunale di Verucchio; Referee: Michele Giorgini

20 August 2023 Friendly	Mantova (Italy)	2–2	(Italy) Rimini	Mantua
17:30 CEST (UTC+2)	Brignani 32'; Monachello 65' (pen.)		Lamesta 41', 45+1'	Stadium: Stadio Danilo Martelli; Referee: Andrea Zoppi

== Competitions ==
=== Overall record ===
Competition	First match	Last match	Starting round	Final position	Record							
Competition	First match	Last match	Starting round	Final position	Pld	W	D	L	GF	GA	GD	Win %
Serie C	1 September 2023	28 April 2024	Matchday 1	10th	38	14	8	16	52	54	−2	36.84
Promotion play-offs	7 May 2024	12 May 2024	First round	Second round	2	1	1	0	1	0	+1	50.00
Coppa Italia Serie C	5 October 2023	28 February 2024	First round	Semi-finals	6	4	1	1	5	2	+3	66.67
Total					46	19	10	17	58	56	+2	41.30

Last updated: 12 May 2024
Source: Soccerway

=== Serie C ===
==== League table ====
Pos	Team	Pld	W	D	L	GF	GA	GD	Pts	Qualification
8	Arezzo	38	14	11	13	46	44	+2	53	Group play-offs 1st round
9	Pontedera	38	14	10	14	53	54	−1	52	Group play-offs 1st round
10	Rimini	38	14	8	16	52	54	−2	50	Group play-offs 1st round
11	SPAL	38	12	13	13	41	40	+1	49	
12	Lucchese	38	11	12	15	34	43	−9	45 (Note: Lucchese are ahead of Virtus Entella and Pineto on head-to-head points: Lucchese 7, Virtus Entella 3, Pineto 3. Virtus Entella are ahead of Pineto on overall goal difference: Virtus Entella -2, Pineto -4.)	

Updated to match(es) played on 28 April 2024. Source: Lega Pro, Soccerway (in English)
Rules for classification: 1) Points; 2) Head-to-head points; 3) Head-to-head goal difference; 4) Goal difference; 5) Goals scored; 6) Lower goals against; 7) Wins; 8) Lower losses; 9) Away wins; 10) Lower home losses.
(Note: Head-to-head record is used only after all the matches between the teams in question have been played)

==== Results summary ====
Overall								Home						Away					
Pld	W	D	L	GF	GA	GD	Pts	W	D	L	GF	GA	GD	W	D	L	GF	GA	GD
38	14	8	16	52	54	−2	50	11	3	5	35	20	+15	3	5	11	17	34	−17

Source: Worldfootball

==== Results by round ====
Round	1	2	3	4	5	6	7	8	9	10	11	12	13	14	15	16	17	18	19	20	21	22	23	24	25	26	27	28	29	30	31	32	33	34	35	36	37	38
Ground	H	A	H	A	H	A	H	A	H	H	A	H	A	A	H	A	H	A	H	A	H	A	H	A	H	A	H	A	A	H	A	H	H	A	H	A	H	A
Result	L	L	W	L	D	L	L	L	D	W	W	W	D	D	W	D	W	L	L	L	W	D	D	D	L	W	W	W	L	L	L	W	W	L	W	L	W	L
Position	14	17	11	16	14	18	20	20	20	19	18	15	12	13	12	12	9	10	13	13	11	11	11	13	13	11	10	8	10	10	12	10	10	10	10	10	10	10

Source: Worldfootball
A = Away; H = Home; W = Win; D = Draw; L = Loss

==== Matches ====
The league fixtures were unveiled on 7 August 2023.

1 September 2023 1	Rimini	1–2	Arezzo	Rimini
20:45 CEST (UTC+2)	Cherubini 67'	Report	Gucci 45'; Iori 53'	Stadium: Stadio Romeo Neri; Attendance: 3,600; Referee: Fabrizio Ramondino

9 September 2023 2	Torres	2–1	Rimini	Sassari
18:30 CEST (UTC+2)	Diakité 36' (pen.), 76'	Report	Gigli 19'	Stadium: Stadio Vanni Sanna; Referee: Mattia Ubaldi

15 September 2023 3	Rimini	4–3	Juventus Next Gen	Rimini
20:45 CEST (UTC+2)	Capanni 3'; Lamesta 54'; Morra 70'; Gigli 87'	Report	Comenencia 1'; Cerri 29'; Turicchia 68'	Stadium: Stadio Romeo Neri; Attendance: 4,006; Referee: Francesco Zago

19 September 2023 4	Pineto	1–0	Rimini	Sassari
18:30 CEST (UTC+2)	Volpicelli 88'	Report		Stadium: Stadio Vanni Sanna; Referee: Luigi Catanoso

23 September 2023 5	Rimini	2–2	Perugia	Rimini
20:45 CEST (UTC+2)	Lamesta 34'; Ubaldi 71'		Kouan 10'; Bartolomei 34'	Stadium: Stadio Romeo Neri; Attendance: 3,605; Referee: Eugenio Scarpa

1 October 2023 6	Cesena	5–2	Rimini	Cesena
16:15 CEST (UTC+2)	Varone 29'; Berti 36'; Donnarumma 52'; Shpendi 54'; Colombo 69' (o.g.)		Lamesta 26'; Marchesi 63'	Stadium: Stadio Dino Manuzzi; Attendance: 14,000; Referee: Gabriele Scatena

8 October 2023 7	Rimini	2–3	Recanatese	Rimini
20:45 CEST (UTC+2)	Lamesta 45+1'; Morra 90+1'		Carpani 2'; Melchiorri 8'; Longobardi 90+2'	Stadium: Stadio Romeo Neri; Attendance: 2,878; Referee: Erminio Cerbasi

16 October 2023 8	Pontedera	4–0	Rimini	Pontedera
20:45 CEST (UTC+2)	Angori 14'; Catanese 21', 29'; Nicastro 67'			Stadium: Stadio Ettore Mannucci; Referee: Gianluca Renzi

22 October 2023 9	Rimini	1–1	Ancona	Rimini
18:30 CEST (UTC+2)	Morra 56'		Basso 43'	Stadium: Stadio Romeo Neri; Attendance: 3,645; Referee: Giuseppe Maria Manzo

26 October 2023 10	Rimini	2–0	Lucchese	Rimini
18:30 CEST (UTC+2)	Lombardi 7'; Morra 77'			Stadium: Stadio Romeo Neri; Attendance: 2,691; Referee: Gabriele Sacchi

6 November 2023 12	Rimini	1–0	SPAL	Rimini
20:30 CET (UTC+1)	Morra 63'			Stadium: Stadio Romeo Neri; Attendance: 3,499; Referee: Valerio Crezzini

13 November 2023 13	Pescara	1–1	Rimini	Pescara
20:45 CET (UTC+1)	Milani 3'		Morra 35'	Stadium: Stadio Adriatico – Giovanni Cornacchia; Referee: Abdoulaye Diop

16 November 2023 11	Sestri Levante	0–1	Rimini	Vercelli
18:00 CET (UTC+1)			Ubaldi 90'	Stadium: Stadio Silvio Piola; Referee: Silvia Gasperotti
Note: The match scheduled for 30 October 2023, was postponed due to bad weather.

25 November 2023 15	Rimini	1–0	Fermana	Rimini
20:45 CET (UTC+1)	Morra 35'			Stadium: Stadio Romeo Neri; Attendance: 2,799; Referee: Giuseppe Rispoli

3 December 2023 16	Vis Pesaro	1–1	Rimini	Pesaro
20:45 CET (UTC+1)	Nina 2'		Morra 78'	Stadium: Stadio Tonino Benelli; Referee: Filippo Colaninno

6 December 2023 14	Olbia	0–0	Rimini	Olbia
18:00 CET (UTC+1)				Stadium: Stadio Bruno Nespoli; Referee: Dario Madonia

10 December 2023 17	Rimini	1–0	Carrarese	Rimini
14:00 CET (UTC+1)	Morra 87' (pen.)			Stadium: Stadio Romeo Neri; Referee: Giuseppe Mucera

16 December 2023 18	Virtus Entella	2–0	Rimini	Chiavari
16:15 CET (UTC+1)	Tascone 7'; Tomaselli 82'			Stadium: Stadio Comunale; Referee: Domenico Leone

22 December 2023 19	Rimini	1–2	Gubbio	Rimini
20:45 CET (UTC+1)	Semeraro (yellow card) 64' (yellow-red card) 72'; Ubaldi 90+6'		Di Massimo 11'; Udoh 79'	Stadium: Stadio Romeo Neri; Referee: Fabio Rosario Luongo

6 January 2024 20	Arezzo	1–0	Rimini	Arezzo
16:15 CET (UTC+1)				Stadium: Stadio Città di Arezzo

14 January 2024 21	Rimini	3–1	Torres	Rimini
CET (UTC+1)				Stadium: Stadio Romeo Neri

20 January 2024 22	Juventus Next Gen	0–0	Rimini	Alessandria
CET (UTC+1)

28 January 2024 23	Rimini	1–1	Pineto	Rimini
CET (UTC+1)				Stadium: Stadio Romeo Neri

3 February 2024 24	Perugia	0–0	Rimini	Perugia
CET (UTC+1)

9 February 2024 25	Rimini	0–2	Cesena	Rimini
CET (UTC+1)				Stadium: Stadio Romeo Neri

13 February 2024 26	Recanatese	1–4	Rimini	Recanati
CET (UTC+1)

18 February 2024 27	Rimini	3–1	Pontedera	Rimini
CET (UTC+1)				Stadium: Stadio Romeo Neri

24 February 2024 28	Ancona	1–3	Rimini	Ancona
CET (UTC+1)				Stadium: Stadio del Conero

3 March 2024 29	Lucchese	2–1	Rimini	Lucca
CET (UTC+1)				Stadium: Stadio Porta Elisa

6 March 2024 30	Rimini	0–1	Sestri Levante	Rimini
CET (UTC+1)				Stadium: Stadio Romeo Neri

10 March 2024 31	SPAL	3–1	Rimini	Ferrara
CET (UTC+1)				Stadium: Stadio Paolo Mazza

15 March 2024 32	Rimini	5–1	Pescara	Rimini
CET (UTC+1)				Stadium: Stadio Romeo Neri

28 March 2024 34	Fermana	3–2	Rimini	Fermo
CET (UTC+1)				Stadium: Stadio Bruno Recchioni

3 April 2024 33	Rimini	5–0	Olbia	Rimini
CEST (UTC+2)				Stadium: Stadio Romeo Neri

7 April 2024 35	Rimini	1–0	Vis Pesaro	Rimini
CEST (UTC+2)				Stadium: Stadio Romeo Neri

14 April 2024 36	Carrarese	3–0	Rimini	Carrara
CEST (UTC+2)				Stadium: Stadio dei Marmi

21 April 2024 37	Rimini	1–0	Virtus Entella	Rimini
CEST (UTC+2)				Stadium: Stadio Romeo Neri

28 April 2024 38	Gubbio	4–0	Rimini	Gubbio
CEST (UTC+2)				Stadium: Stadio Pietro Barbetti

==== Promotion play-offs ====
7 May 2024 First round	Gubbio	0–1	Rimini	Gubbio
20:30 CEST (UTC+2)			Cernigoi 85'	Stadium: Stadio Pietro Barbetti; Referee: Giuseppe Mucera

11 May 2024 Second round	Perugia	0–0	Rimini	Perugia
20:30 CEST (UTC+2)				Stadium: Stadio Renato Curi; Referee: Alberto Ruben Arena

=== Coppa Italia Serie C ===
5 October 2023 First round	Rimini	1–0	Gubbio	Rimini
20:45 CEST (UTC+2)	Morra 90+6'			Stadium: Stadio Romeo Neri; Attendance: 741; Referee: Cristiano Ursini

9 November 2023 Second round	Rimini	1–0	Perugia	Rimini
17:00 CET (UTC+1)	Capanni 9'			Stadium: Stadio Romeo Neri; Attendance: 561; Referee: Valerio Vogliacco

28 November 2023 Round of 16	Cesena	0–2	Rimini	Cesena
21:00 CET (UTC+1)			Iacoponi 9'; Lamesta 85'	Stadium: Stadio Dino Manuzzi; Attendance: 4,486; Referee: Bogdan Nicolae Sfira

13 December 2023 Quarter-finals	Vicenza	0–0 (a.e.t.) (4–5 p)	Rimini	Vicenza
18:30 CET (UTC+1)				Stadium: Stadio Romeo Menti; Referee: Andrea Calzavara
	Penalties
	De Maio (penalty scored); Ronaldo (penalty missed); Jiménez (penalty scored); Ferrari (penalty scored); Laezza (penalty scored)		(penalty scored) Ubaldi; (penalty scored) Lombardi; (penalty scored) Langella; (penalty scored) Selvini; (penalty scored) Stanga

24 January 2024 Semi-finals; First leg	Rimini	1–0	Catania	Rimini
--:-- CET (UTC+1)				Stadium: Stadio Romeo Neri

28 February 2024 Semi-finals; Second leg	Catania	2–0 (2–1 agg.)	Rimini	Catania
--:-- CET (UTC+1)				Stadium: Stadio Angelo Massimino
