= List of Italian football transfers summer 2022 =

The 2022 Italian football summer transfer window ran from 1 July to 1 September 2022. This list includes transfers featuring at least one club from either Serie A or Serie B.

== Transfers ==
Legend

- Those clubs in Italic indicate that the player already left the team on loan on this or the previous season or a new signing that immediately left the club.

Date	Name	Moving from	Moving to	Fee
8 January 2022	Lorenzo Insigne	Napoli	(Canada) Toronto	Free (Note: Effective on 1 July 2022)
21 March 2022	(Republic of Ireland) Festy Ebosele	(England) Derby County	Udinese	Free
28 March 2022	(Slovenia) Sandi Lovrić	(Switzerland) Lugano	Udinese	Free
26 May 2022	(Cameroon) André-Frank Zambo Anguissa	(England) Fulham	Napoli	Undisclosed (Note: The player already played for his new club in the 2021-2022 season, the deal turned from temporary to definitive.)
26 May 2022	(Uruguay) Mathías Olivera	(Spain) Getafe	Napoli	Undisclosed
26 May 2022	(Denmark) Magnus Kofod Andersen	(Denmark) Nordsjælland	Venezia	Undisclosed
27 May 2022	(Poland) Przemysław Wiśniewski	(Poland) Górnik Zabrze	Venezia	Undisclosed
28 May 2022	(Norway) Jens Petter Hauge	Milan	(Germany) Eintracht Frankfurt	Undisclosed
28 May 2022	(Luxembourg) Issa Bah	(Luxembourg) Progrès Niederkorn	Venezia	Undisclosed
28 May 2022	(Iceland) Hilmir Rafn Mikaelsson	(Iceland) Fjölnir	Venezia	Undisclosed
29 May 2022	(France) Nathan Buayi-Kiala	(France) Lille	Parma	Free
31 May 2022	(Croatia) Ivan Perišić	Inter	(England) Tottenham Hotspur	Free
1 June 2022	Francesco Zampano	Frosinone	Venezia	Free
4 June 2022	(Sweden) Robin Olsen	Roma	(England) Aston Villa	Undisclosed
4 June 2022	Federico Brancolini	Fiorentina	Lecce	Free
5 June 2022	(Portugal) Leonardo Buta	(Portugal) Braga	Udinese	Undisclosed
13 June 2022	Giorgio Chiellini	Juventus	(United States) Los Angeles FC	Free
14 June 2022	(Serbia) Nemanja Matić	(England) Manchester United	Roma	Free
15 June 2022	(Denmark) Magnus Warming	Torino	(Germany) SV Darmstadt 98	Loan
15 June 2022	Stefano Moreo	Empoli	Brescia	Undisclosed
15 June 2022	(Austria) David Schnegg	Venezia	(Austria) Sturm Graz	Undisclosed
16 June 2022	(The Gambia) Assan Ceesay	(Switzerland) Zürich	Lecce	Free
17 June 2022	(Argentina) Giovanni Simeone	Cagliari	Verona	Undisclosed
17 June 2022	(Uruguay) Agustín Álvarez	(Uruguay) Peñarol	Sassuolo	Undisclosed
17 June 2022	(Turkey) Merih Demiral	Juventus	Atalanta	€20m
17 June 2022	Alberto Paleari	Genoa	Benevento	Undisclosed
17 June 2022	(Slovenia) Petar Stojanović	(Croatia) Dinamo Zagreb	Empoli	Undisclosed
17 June 2022	(New Zealand) Liberato Cacace	(Belgium) Sint-Truiden	Empoli	Undisclosed
18 June 2022	Lorenzo Andrenacci	Genoa	Brescia	Undisclosed
18 June 2022	(Mexico) Johan Vásquez	Genoa	Cremonese	Loan
18 June 2022	Guglielmo Vicario	Cagliari	Empoli	Undisclosed
20 June 2022	(Brazil) Marcos Antônio	(Ukraine) Shakhtar Donetsk	Lazio	Undisclosed
21 June 2022	(Slovenia) Klemen Hvalič	Empoli	(Slovenia) Koper	Undisclosed
21 June 2022	(Croatia) Boško Šutalo	Atalanta	(Croatia) Dinamo Zagreb	Undisclosed
21 June 2022	(United States) Bryan Reynolds	Roma	(Belgium) Westerlo	Loan
21 June 2022	(Spain) Raúl Asencio	Lecce	Cittadella	Free
21 June 2022	Andrea Ranocchia	Inter	Monza	Free
21 June 2022	Mirko Carretta	Perugia	Südtirol	Undisclosed
21 June 2022	Enrico Delprato	Atalanta	Parma	Undisclosed
21 June 2022	(Brazil) Daniel Fuzato	Roma	(Spain) Ibiza	Undisclosed
22 June 2022	Joshua Tenkorang	Campobasso	Cremonese	Undisclosed
23 June 2022	Samuele Perisan	Pordenone	Empoli	Undisclosed
23 June 2022	(Guinea-Bissau) Carlos Embaló	(Belgium) Eupen	Cittadella	Undisclosed
23 June 2022	Riccardo Capellini	Juventus	Benevento	Undisclosed
23 June 2022	(Austria) Stefan Ilsanker	(Germany) Eintracht Frankfurt	Genoa	Undisclosed
24 June 2022	Simone Romagnoli	Empoli	Parma	Undisclosed
24 June 2022	(Belgium) Senna Miangué	Cagliari	(Belgium) Cercle Brugge	Undisclosed
24 June 2022	(Denmark) Jens Odgaard	Sassuolo	(Netherlands) AZ Alkmaar	Undisclosed
25 June 2022	Fabio Lucioni	Lecce	Frosinone	Loan
27 June 2022	(Slovenia) Vid Belec	Salernitana	(Cyprus) APOEL	Undisclosed
27 June 2022	Gianluca Frabotta	Juventus	Lecce	Loan
27 June 2022	Alessio Cragno	Cagliari	Monza	Loan
27 June 2022	(Brazil) Lucas Leiva	Lazio	(Brazil) Grêmio	Free
28 June 2022	Francesco Di Tacchio	Salernitana	Ternana	Undisclosed
28 June 2022	Mattia Destro	Genoa	Empoli	Free
28 June 2022	Alessandro Iacobucci	Pescara	Südtirol	Free
28 June 2022	Tommaso D'Orazio	Ascoli	Südtirol	Free
28 June 2022	Andrea Fulignati	Perugia	Catanzaro	Undisclosed
28 June 2022	Pietro Pellegri	Monaco	Torino	Undisclosed
29 June 2022	(Norway) Emil Bohinen	(Russia) CSKA Moscow	Salernitana	Undisclosed
29 June 2022	Domenico Criscito	Genoa	(Canada) Toronto	Free
29 June 2022	(Belgium) Romelu Lukaku	(England) Chelsea	Inter	Loan
29 June 2022	(Spain) Josep Martínez	(Germany) RB Leipzig	Genoa	Loan
29 June 2022	(Serbia) Milan Kremenovic	Frosinone	(Bulgaria) Hebar Pazardzhik	Loan
29 June 2022	Victor De Lucia	Frosinone	Virtus Entella	Undisclosed
30 June 2022	Andrea Carboni	Cagliari	Monza	Undisclosed
30 June 2022	Alessandro Di Pardo	Juventus	Cagliari	Undisclosed
30 June 2022	Massimo Coda	Lecce	Genoa	Undisclosed
30 June 2022	(Albania) Kristjan Asllani	Empoli	Inter	Loan
30 June 2022	(Slovenia) Lovro Stubljar	(Slovenia) Domžale	Empoli	Undisclosed
30 June 2022	Walid Cheddira	Parma	Bari	Undisclosed
30 June 2022	Simone Rabbi	Bologna	S.P.A.L.	Free
30 June 2022	Christian Dalle Mura	Fiorentina	S.P.A.L.	Free
30 June 2022	Nicolas Galazzi	Venezia	Brescia	Undisclosed
30 June 2022	Luca Lezzerini	Venezia	Brescia	Undisclosed
30 June 2022	(Finland) Jesse Joronen	Brescia	Venezia	Undisclosed
30 June 2022	Roberto Piccoli	Atalanta	Verona	Loan
30 June 2022	Matteo Cancellieri	Verona	Lazio	Loan
1 July 2022	(Greece) Charalampos Lykogiannis	Cagliari	Bologna	Free
1 July 2022	Vincenzo Garofalo	Foggia	Brescia	Free
1 July 2022	Ilario Monterisi	Lecce	Frosinone	Loan
1 July 2022	(Netherlands) Reuven Niemeijer	(Netherlands) Excelsior	Brescia	Free
1 July 2022	Kevin Piscopo	Empoli	Pordenone	Undisclosed
1 July 2022	(Bosnia and Herzegovina) Milan Đurić	Salernitana	Verona	Free
1 July 2022	(Cameroon) André Onana	(Netherlands) Ajax	Inter	Free
1 July 2022	(Georgia (country)) Khvicha Kvaratskhelia	(Georgia (country)) Dinamo Batumi	Napoli	Undisclosed
1 July 2022	(Argentina) Facundo Zabala	(Cyprus) APOEL	Venezia	Undisclosed
1 July 2022	(Serbia) Mile Svilar	(Portugal) Benfica	Roma	Free
1 July 2022	Alessandro Florenzi	Roma	Milan	Undisclosed
1 July 2022	Alberto Cerri	Cagliari	Como	Loan
1 July 2022	Christian D'Urso	Perugia	Cosenza	Undisclosed
1 July 2022	(Argentina) Nahuel Estévez	Crotone	Parma	Undisclosed
1 July 2022	(Croatia) Anton Krešić	Atalanta	(Croatia) Rijeka	Undisclosed
1 July 2022	(Poland) Olaf Kobacki	Atalanta	(Poland) Arka Gdynia	Undisclosed
1 July 2022	(France) Axel Guessand	(France) Nancy	Udinese	Free
1 July 2022	Giovanni Mercurio	Bari	Fidelis Andria	Loan
2 July 2022	Marco Varnier	Atalanta	S.P.A.L.	Loan
2 July 2022	(Ivory Coast) Emmanuel Latte Lath	Atalanta	(Switzerland) St. Gallen	Loan
2 July 2022	Tommaso Milanese	Roma	Cremonese	Undisclosed
2 July 2022	(Armenia) Henrikh Mkhitaryan	Roma	Inter	Free
2 July 2022	Stefano Sensi	Inter	Monza	Loan
2 July 2022	Tommaso Fantacci	Empoli	Pontedera	Loan
2 July 2022	Nicolas Viola	Bologna	Cagliari	Free
3 July 2022	Roberto Biancu	Cagliari	Olbia	Undisclosed
3 July 2022	Nicola Rauti	Torino	S.P.A.L.	Loan
3 July 2022	(Belgium) Daan Heymans	Venezia	(Belgium) Charleroi	Undisclosed
4 July 2022	Simone Giordano	Sampdoria	Ascoli	Loan
4 July 2022	(Denmark) Lukas Klitten	Frosinone	(Denmark) Silkeborg	Loan
4 July 2022	Sebastiano Esposito	Inter	(Belgium) Anderlecht	Loan
4 July 2022	Mattia Sprocati	Parma	Südtirol	Free
4 July 2022	Luca Zanimacchia	Juventus	Cremonese	Loan
4 July 2022	Riccardo Ciervo	Sassuolo	Frosinone	Loan
4 July 2022	Luca Moro	Sassuolo	Frosinone	Loan
4 July 2022	Stefano Turati	Sassuolo	Frosinone	Loan
4 July 2022	Rolando Mandragora	Juventus	Fiorentina	€8.2m
4 July 2022	(Uruguay) Martín Satriano	Inter	Empoli	Loan
4 July 2022	(France) Brian Bayeye	Catanzaro	Torino	Undisclosed
4 July 2022	Matteo Ricci	Frosinone	(Turkey) Karagümrük	Loan
4 July 2022	Emanuel Ercolano	Sampdoria	Turris	Loan
4 July 2022	(Ivory Coast) Franck Kessié	Milan	(Spain) Barcelona	Free
4 July 2022	Luiz Felipe	Lazio	(Spain) Betis	Free
5 July 2022	(Turkey) Zeki Çelik	(France) Lille	Roma	7M€
5 July 2022	(Nigeria) Tyronne Ebuehi	(Portugal) Benfica	Empoli	Undisclosed
5 July 2022	(Venezuela) Tomás Rincón	Torino	Sampdoria	Free
5 July 2022	Filippo Delli Carri	Juventus	Como	Free
5 July 2022	(Senegal) Racine Ba	Correggese	Como	Free
5 July 2022	(Albania) Giacomo Vrioni	Juventus	(United States) New England Revolution	Undisclosed
5 July 2022	Niccolò Corrado	Inter	Ternana	Undisclosed
5 July 2022	(Belgium) Divock Origi	(England) Liverpool	Milan	Free
5 July 2022	Enrico Brignola	Benevento	Cosenza	Loan
5 July 2022	(Sweden) Nermin Karić	Virtus Entella	Benevento	Undisclosed
5 July 2022	(Greece) Ilias Koutsoupias	Virtus Entella	Benevento	Undisclosed
5 July 2022	(Romania) Răzvan Marin	Cagliari	Empoli	Loan
6 July 2022	Raoul Bellanova	Cagliari	Inter	Loan
6 July 2022	Manuel Di Paola	Modena	Vis Pesaro	Undisclosed
6 July 2022	Andrea Seculin	Pistoiese	Modena	Free
6 July 2022	Diego Falcinelli	Bologna	Modena	Free
6 July 2022	(Iceland) Andri Baldursson	Bologna	(Netherlands) NEC	Loan
6 July 2022	Matteo Angeli	Imolese	Bologna	Loan
6 July 2022	(Uruguay) Franco Israel	Juventus	(Portugal) Sporting	Undisclosed
6 July 2022	(Switzerland) Christopher Lungoyi	Juventus	Ascoli	Loan
6 July 2022	Matteo Pessina	Atalanta	Monza	Loan
6 July 2022	Matteo Lovato	Atalanta	Salernitana	Undisclosed
6 July 2022	(Brazil) Éderson	Salernitana	Atalanta	Undisclosed
6 July 2022	(Slovakia) Denis Vavro	Lazio	(Denmark) Copenhagen	Undisclosed
6 July 2022	(Netherlands) Bobby Adekanye	Lazio	(Netherlands) Go Ahead Eagles	Undisclosed
6 July 2022	Sergio Maselli	Lecce	Juve Stabia	Undisclosed
7 July 2022	Giorgio Cittadini	Atalanta	Modena	Loan
7 July 2022	Samuele Birindelli	Pisa	Monza	Undisclosed
7 July 2022	Amato Ciciretti	Pordenone	Ascoli	Loan
7 July 2022	Alberto Barison	Pordenone	Südtirol	Undisclosed
7 July 2022	Simone Mazzocchi	Atalanta	Südtirol	Loan
7 July 2022	(Norway) Erik Botheim	(Russia) Krasnodar	Salernitana	Free
7 July 2022	(Serbia) Nemanja Radonjić	(France) Marseille	Torino	Loan
7 July 2022	Lorenzo Colombo	Milan	Lecce	Loan
7 July 2022	(Brazil) Junior Messias	Crotone	Milan	Undisclosed
7 July 2022	(United States) Jack de Vries	(United States) Philadelphia Union	Venezia	Undisclosed
7 July 2022	(Argentina) Fabian Pavone	Parma	Fidelis Andria	Loan
7 July 2022	Pietro Martino	Foggia	Cosenza	Free
8 July 2022	(Spain) Pepe Reina	Lazio	(Spain) Villarreal	Free
8 July 2022	(Argentina) Ángel Di María	(France) PSG	Juventus	Free
8 July 2022	Pietro Iemmello	Frosinone	Catanzaro	Undisclosed
8 July 2022	Samuele Damiani	Empoli	Palermo	Undisclosed
8 July 2022	Davide Zappella	Empoli	Virtus Entella	Undisclosed
8 July 2022	Nicolò Casale	Verona	Lazio	Undisclosed
8 July 2022	Edoardo Iannoni	Salernitana	Perugia	2-year loan
8 July 2022	(Brazil) Léo Duarte	Milan	(Turkey) İstanbul Başakşehir	Undisclosed
8 July 2022	Leonardo Sernicola	Sassuolo	Cremonese	Undisclosed
8 July 2022	(Romania) Vlad Chiricheș	Sassuolo	Cremonese	Undisclosed
8 July 2022	(Romania) Ionuț Radu	Inter	Cremonese	Loan
8 July 2022	(Serbia) Luka Jović	(Spain) Real Madrid	Fiorentina	Undisclosed
8 July 2022	Ivan Saio	Sampdoria	Arzignano	Loan
9 July 2022	Pierluigi Gollini	Atalanta	Fiorentina	Loan
9 July 2022	Luca Belardinelli	Empoli	Südtirol	Loan
9 July 2022	Marco Pompetti	Inter	Südtirol	Loan
9 July 2022	(Scotland) Aaron Hickey	Bologna	(England) Brentford	Undisclosed
9 July 2022	(Slovenia) Nik Prelec	Sampdoria	(Austria) WSG Tirol	Undisclosed
9 July 2022	Francesco Vicari	S.P.A.L.	Bari	Undisclosed
9 July 2022	Luca Gagliano	Cagliari	Padova	Undisclosed
9 July 2022	Christian Dimarco	Inter	FeralpiSalò	Undisclosed
9 July 2022	(Canada) Damiano Pecile	(Canada) Vancouver Whitecaps	Venezia	Undisclosed
10 July 2022	(Belgium) Koni De Winter	Juventus	Empoli	Loan
10 July 2022	(Croatia) Roko Jureškin	(Slovakia) Sereď	Pisa	Undisclosed
10 July 2022	Felice D'Amico	Sampdoria	Pro Sesto	Loan
10 July 2022	Giuseppe Bellusci	Monza	Ascoli	Undisclosed
11 July 2022	(France) Paul Pogba	(England) Man United	Juventus	Free
11 July 2022	Cristian Andreoni	Bari	Pordenone	Undisclosed
11 July 2022	(Argentina) Tiago Casasola	Lazio	Perugia	Undisclosed
11 July 2022	(Argentina) Franco Carboni	Inter	Cagliari	Loan
11 July 2022	(Croatia) Marko Pajač	Brescia	Genoa	Free
11 July 2022	Lorenzo Sgarbi	Napoli	Renate	Loan
11 July 2022	(Chile) Diego Valencia	(Chile) Universidad Católica	Salernitana	Loan
11 July 2022	(Colombia) David Ospina	Napoli	(Saudi Arabia) Al Nassr	Free
12 July 2022	(Portugal) Luís Nani	Venezia	(Australia) Melbourne Victory	Free
12 July 2022	(Norway) Kristian Thorstvedt	(Belgium) Genk	Sassuolo	Undisclosed
12 July 2022	(Scotland) Lewis Ferguson	(Scotland) Aberdeen	Bologna	Undisclosed
12 July 2022	Federico Baschirotto	Ascoli	Lecce	Undisclosed
12 July 2022	Francesco Donati	Empoli	Ascoli	Loan
12 July 2022	Francesco Folino	Empoli	Carrarese	Undisclosed
12 July 2022	Roberto Pirrello	Empoli	Pordenone	Undisclosed
12 July 2022	Leonardo Benedetti	Sampdoria	Bari	Loan
12 July 2022	(Hungary) Márk Csinger	S.P.A.L.	(Slovenia) Dunajská Streda	Undisclosed
12 July 2022	(Poland) Jakub Iskra	S.P.A.L.	(Poland) Sandecja Nowy Sącz	Undisclosed
12 July 2022	Federico Zanchetta	S.P.A.L.	Olbia	Loan
12 July 2022	(Romania) Daniel Dumbravanu	Genoa	S.P.A.L.	Undisclosed
12 July 2022	(Romania) Daniel Dumbravanu	S.P.A.L.	(Cyprus) APOEL	Loan
12 July 2022	(Spain) Samu Castillejo	Milan	(Spain) Valencia	Undisclosed
12 July 2022	Alessio Romagnoli	Milan	Lazio	Free
12 July 2022	(Spain) Mario Gila	(Spain) Real Madrid	Lazio	Undisclosed
12 July 2022	Hans Nicolussi Caviglia	Juventus	Südtirol	Loan
13 July 2022	(Portugal) Luís Maximiano	(Spain) Granada	Lazio	Undisclosed
13 July 2022	(Scotland) Josh Boig	(Scotland) Hibernian	Verona	Undisclosed
13 July 2022	Elia Caprile	(England) Leeds United	Bari	Undisclosed
13 July 2022	Nicholas Pierini	Cesena	Venezia	Undisclosed
13 July 2022	Luca Lombardi	Monza	Pescara	Undisclosed
13 July 2022	Daniele Sommariva	Monza	Pescara	Undisclosed
13 July 2022	Alessandro Sorrentino	Pescara	Monza	Undisclosed
13 July 2022	Federico Furlan	Ternana	Triestina	Loan
13 July 2022	Samuele Spalluto	Fiorentina	Ternana	Loan
13 July 2022	Giovanni Di Noia	Perugia	Foggia	Undisclosed
13 July 2022	Stefano Gori	Juventus	Perugia	Loan
13 July 2022	(Croatia) Stipe Vulikić	(Croatia) Hrvatski Dragovoljac	Perugia	Loan
13 July 2022	(Albania) Kleis Bozhanaj	Spezia	Carrarese	Loan
13 July 2022	(Sweden) Albin Ekdal	Sampdoria	Spezia	Free
13 July 2022	Alex Sposito	Empoli	Sangiuliano City	Undisclosed
13 July 2022	Luca Belloni	Olbia	Cagliari	Loan
13 July 2022	(Sweden) Joel Persson Voelkerling	Roma	Lecce	Undisclosed
14 July 2022	Leonardo Pezzola	Empoli	Piacenza	Loan
14 July 2022	Andrea Cambiaso	Genoa	Juventus	€8.5m
14 July 2022	(Romania) Radu Drăgușin	Juventus	Genoa	Loan
14 July 2022	(Chile) Arturo Vidal	Inter	(Brazil) Flamengo	Free
14 July 2022	Alfonso Sepe	Sampdoria	San Donato Tavarnelle	Loan
14 July 2022	Niccolò Gabrieli	Südtirol	Olbia	Loan
14 July 2022	Ludovico Gelmi	Atalanta	Olbia	Loan
14 July 2022	(Republic of Ireland) Aaron Connolly	(England) Brighton	Venezia	Loan
14 July 2022	(Slovenia) Jaka Bijol	(Russia) CSKA Moscow	Udinese	Undisclosed
14 July 2022	(Argentina) Leandro Chichizola	Perugia	Parma	Free
14 July 2022	(Morocco) Hamza El Kaouakibi	Pordenone	Benevento	Undisclosed
14 July 2022	(Albania) Thomas Strakosha	Lazio	(England) Brentford	Free
15 July 2022	Andrea Cambiaso	Juventus	Bologna	Loan
15 July 2022	Gianmarco Cangiano	Bologna	Bari	Loan
15 July 2022	Gaetano Oristanio	Inter	(Netherlands) Volendam	Loan
15 July 2022	Frank Tsadjout	Milan	Cremonese	Undisclosed
15 July 2022	(United States) Andrija Novakovich	Frosinone	Venezia	Undisclosed
15 July 2022	(Croatia) Domagoj Bradarić	(France) Lille	Salernitana	Undisclosed
15 July 2022	(Republic of the Congo) Antoine Makoumbou	(Slovenia) Maribor	Cagliari	Undisclosed
15 July 2022	Salvatore Burrai	Perugia	Pordenone	Undisclosed
15 July 2022	Lorenzo Moretti	Inter	Avellino	Undisclosed
16 July 2022	(Sweden) Mattias Svanberg	Bologna	(Germany) VfL Wolfsburg	Undisclosed
16 July 2022	(Senegal) Kalidou Koulibaly	Napoli	(England) Chelsea	Undisclosed
16 July 2022	(France) Thomas Henry	Venezia	Verona	Undisclosed
16 July 2022	Daniele Ghilardi	Fiorentina	Verona	Undisclosed
16 July 2022	Daniele Ghilardi	Verona	Mantova	Loan
16 July 2022	Christian Pierobon	Verona	Mantova	Loan
16 July 2022	(Ghana) Philip Yeboah	Verona	Mantova	Loan
16 July 2022	(Switzerland) Kevin Rüegg	Verona	(Switzerland) Young Boys	Loan
16 July 2022	Daniele Sarzi Puttini	Ascoli	Triestina	Undisclosed
16 July 2022	Matteo Arena	Monopoli	S.P.A.L.	Undisclosed
16 July 2022	Gabriele Moncini	Benevento	S.P.A.L.	Loan
16 July 2022	Gabriele Bellodi	Milan	Olbia	Loan
16 July 2022	Federico Bernardeschi	Juventus	(Canada) Toronto	Free
16 July 2022	Emanuele Matteucci	Empoli	Mantova	Undisclosed
17 July 2022	Mattia Caldara	Milan	Spezia	Loan
17 July 2022	Paolo Ghiglione	Genoa	Cremonese	Undisclosed
17 July 2022	Matteo Brunori	Juventus	Palermo	Undisclosed
17 July 2022	Wladimiro Falcone	Sampdoria	Lecce	Loan
17 July 2022	(Norway) Kristoffer Askildsen	Sampdoria	Lecce	Loan
18 July 2022	(Croatia) Karlo Butić	Pordenone	Cosenza	Loan
18 July 2022	(Morocco) Adam Masina	(England) Watford	Udinese	Undisclosed
18 July 2022	Simone Canestrelli	Empoli	Pisa	Loan
18 July 2022	Sebastiano Luperto	Napoli	Empoli	Loan
18 July 2022	(Norway) Leo Skiri Østigård	(England) Brighton	Napoli	Undisclosed
18 July 2022	Alessandro Pilati	Sassuolo	FeralpiSalò	Undisclosed
18 July 2022	(Netherlands) Ryan Flamingo	Sassuolo	(Netherlands) Vitesse	Loan
18 July 2022	(Republic of Ireland) Liam Kerrigan	(Republic of Ireland) University College Dublin	Como	Undisclosed
18 July 2022	Tommaso Morosini	Monza	Sangiuliano	Loan
19 July 2022	(Netherlands) Matthijs de Ligt	Juventus	(Germany) Bayern Munich	€67+10m
19 July 2022	Simone Colombi	Parma	Reggina	Undisclosed
19 July 2022	Alessandro Lombardi	Imolese	Reggina	Free
19 July 2022	Lorenzo Di Stefano	Sampdoria	Reggina	Loan
19 July 2022	(France) Junior Sambia	(France) Montpellier	Salernitana	Undisclosed
19 July 2022	(Spain) Kaleb Jimenez	Salernitana	Vicenza	Loan
19 July 2022	(Norway) Morten Thorsby	Sampdoria	(Germany) Union Berlin	Undisclosed
19 July 2022	(England) Luis Binks	Bologna	Como	Loan
19 July 2022	(Argentina) Diego Peralta	Ternana	Foggia	Undisclosed
19 July 2022	Davide Diaw	Monza	Modena	Loan
19 July 2022	Fabio Maistro	Lazio	S.P.A.L.	Undisclosed
19 July 2022	Andrea La Mantia	Empoli	S.P.A.L.	Loan
19 July 2022	Bruno Conti	Cagliari	Verona	Undisclosed
19 July 2022	Niccolò Squizzato	Inter	Renate	Loan
20 July 2022	Matteo Anzolin	Juventus	(Austria) Wolfsberger AC	Undisclosed
20 July 2022	(Argentina) Paulo Dybala	Juventus	Roma	Free
20 July 2022	Michele Camporese	Pordenone	Reggina	Undisclosed
20 July 2022	(Nigeria) Joel Obi	Salernitana	Reggina	Free
20 July 2022	Gaetano Vitale	Salernitana	Monopoli	Undisclosed
20 July 2022	Simone Ghidotti	Fiorentina	Como	Undisclosed
20 July 2022	(Spain) Cristo González	Udinese	Sporting Gijón	Loan
20 July 2022	(Brazil) Gleison Bremer	Torino	Juventus	€41+8m
20 July 2022	(Serbia) Miloš Vulić	Crotone	Perugia	Undisclosed
20 July 2022	Alessandro Malomo	Südtirol	Foggia	Undisclosed
20 July 2022	Riccardo Boscolo Chio	Inter	Pro Sesto	Loan
20 July 2022	(Argentina) Franco Vezzoni	Inter	Pro Patria	Loan
20 July 2022	(Serbia) Filip Stanković	Inter	(Netherlands) Volendam	Loan
21 July 2022	(Turkey) Güven Yalçın	(Turkey) Beşiktaş	Genoa	Undisclosed
21 July 2022	João Pedro	Cagliari	(Turkey) Fenerbahçe	Undisclosed
21 July 2022	(Brazil) Rodrigo Guth	Atalanta	(Netherlands) Fortuna Sittard	Undisclosed
21 July 2022	(Croatia) Lorenco Šimić	Lecce	Ascoli	Undisclosed
21 July 2022	Mario Gargiulo	Lecce	Modena	Undisclosed
21 July 2022	Francesco Rillo	Benevento	Potenza	Loan
21 July 2022	Giuseppe Di Serio	Benevento	Perugia	Undisclosed
21 July 2022	Federico Ravaglia	Bologna	Reggina	Loan
21 July 2022	Gianluca Caprari	Verona	Monza	Loan
21 July 2022	Filippo Ranocchia	Juventus	Monza	Loan
21 July 2022	Francesco Galuppini	Südtirol	Novara	Loan
22 July 2022	(Brazil) Dodô	(Ukraine) Shakhtar Donetsk	Fiorentina	Undisclosed
22 July 2022	(Kosovo) Vedat Muriqi	Lazio	(Spain) Mallorca	Undisclosed
22 July 2022	Mirko Pigliacelli	(Romania) U Craiova	Palermo	Undisclosed
22 July 2022	Vittorio Agostinelli	Fiorentina	Reggina	Loan
22 July 2022	(Romania) Eduard Duțu	Fiorentina	Reggina	Loan
22 July 2022	Niccolò Pierozzi	Fiorentina	Reggina	Loan
22 July 2022	(Belgium) Tibo Persyn	Inter	(Netherlands) Eindhoven	Loan
22 July 2022	Mattia Sangalli	Inter	Lecco	Loan
22 July 2022	Alessandro Cortinovis	Atalanta	Verona	Loan
22 July 2022	(Switzerland) Charles Pickel	(Portugal) Famalicão	Cremonese	Undisclosed
22 July 2022	(Argentina) Franco Ferrari	Napoli	Vicenza	Undisclosed
22 July 2022	Thomas Vettorel	Frosinone	Monopoli	Loan
22 July 2022	Amedeo Benedetti	Cittadella	Pordenone	Undisclosed
22 July 2022	Gian Filippo Felicioli	Venezia	Cittadella	Free
22 July 2022	Matteo Panattoni	Pisa	Taranto	Loan
23 July 2022	(Croatia) Luka Bogdan	Salernitana	Ternana	Loan
23 July 2022	(France) Daniel Frey	Cremonese	Carrarese	Loan
23 July 2022	(Argentina) Santiago Ascacíbar	(Germany) Hertha BSC	Cremonese	Loan
24 July 2022	(Croatia) Kristijan Bistrović	(Russia) CSKA Moscow	Lecce	Loan
24 July 2022	(Sweden) Riccardo Gagliolo	Salernitana	Reggina	Undisclosed
25 July 2022	Luigi Canotto	Frosinone	Reggina	Loan
25 July 2022	Samuele Mulattieri	Inter	Frosinone	Loan
25 July 2022	(Belgium) Zinho Vanheusden	Inter	(Netherlands) AZ Alkmaar	Loan
25 July 2022	(Peru) Gianluca Lapadula	Benevento	Cagliari	Undisclosed
25 July 2022	Pierluca Luciani	Frosinone	Siena	Loan
26 July 2022	Leonardo Mancuso	Empoli	Monza	Undisclosed
26 July 2022	Leonardo Mancuso	Monza	Como	Loan
26 July 2022	Alessandro Plizzari	Milan	Pescara	Undisclosed
26 July 2022	Andrea Meroni	Sassuolo	Cosenza	Undisclosed
26 July 2022	(Colombia) Damir Ceter	Cagliari	Bari	Free
26 July 2022	Federico Bonazzoli	Sampdoria	Salernitana	Undisclosed
26 July 2022	Antonino La Gumina	Sampdoria	Benevento	Loan
26 July 2022	(Netherlands) Cas Odenthal	(Netherlands) NEC Nijmegen	Como	Free
26 July 2022	Giacomo Quagliata	(Netherlands) Heracles	Cremonese	Undisclosed
26 July 2022	Gianluca Scamacca	Sassuolo	(England) West Ham	Undisclosed
26 July 2022	Michael Folorunsho	Napoli	Bari	Loan
26 July 2022	Nicola Bellomo	Reggina	Bari	Undisclosed
26 July 2022	Lorenzo Lollo	Bari	Reggina	Undisclosed
27 July 2022	(France) Maxime Giron	Palermo	Crotone	Undisclosed
27 July 2022	(Romania) Ionuț Nedelcearu	Crotone	Palermo	Undisclosed
27 July 2022	(South Korea) Kim Min-jae	(Turkey) Fenerbahçe	Napoli	Undisclosed
27 July 2022	(Cyprus) Nicholas Ioannou	(England) Nottingham Forest	Como	Undisclosed
27 July 2022	Marco Alia	Lazio	Monterosi	Undisclosed
27 July 2022	Luca Falbo	Lazio	Monopoli	Undisclosed
27 July 2022	Emanuele Cicerelli	Lazio	Reggina	Loan
27 July 2022	Nicolò Armini	Lazio	Potenza	Loan
27 July 2022	Jacopo Dall'Oglio	Palermo	Avellino	Undisclosed
28 July 2022	(Spain) Jony Rodríguez	Lazio	(Spain) Sporting Gijón	Loan
28 July 2022	(France) Maxime Leverbe	Pisa	Sampdoria	Loan
28 July 2022	Ernesto Torregrossa	Sampdoria	Pisa	Loan
28 July 2022	Marco Somma	Sampdoria	Pontedera	Undisclosed
28 July 2022	Tommaso Farabegoli	Sampdoria	Sangiuliano City	Undisclosed
28 July 2022	Matteo Stoppa	Sampdoria	Palermo	Loan
28 July 2022	Marco Sala	Sassuolo	Palermo	Loan
28 July 2022	(Colombia) Yeferson Paz	Sassuolo	Perugia	Loan
28 July 2022	(France) Sebastien De Maio	Vicenza	Modena	Loan
28 July 2022	Fabio Scarsella	Modena	Vicenza	Undisclosed
28 July 2022	Thomas Battistella	Udinese	Modena	Undisclosed
28 July 2022	(Argentina) Nahuel Molina	Udinese	(Spain) Atlético Madrid	Undisclosed
28 July 2022	(France) Leroy Abanda	Milan	(Belgium) Seraing	Free
28 July 2022	(France) Warren Bondo	(France) Nancy	Monza	Free
28 July 2022	(Nigeria) David Okereke	(Belgium) Club Brugge	Cremonese	Undisclosed
28 July 2022	Salvatore Elia	Atalanta	Palermo	Loan
28 July 2022	Filippo Berra	Pisa	Südtirol	Undisclosed
29 July 2022	(Cameroon) Enzo Ebosse	(France) Angers	Udinese	Undisclosed
29 July 2022	(Argentina) Nehuén Pérez	(Spain) Atlético Madrid	Udinese	Undisclosed
29 July 2022	(Morocco) Camil Mmaee	(Belgium) Standard Liège	Bologna	Undisclosed
29 July 2022	(Belgium) Arthur Theate	Bologna	(France) Stade Rennais	Undisclosed
29 July 2022	(Brazil) Mikael	Salernitana	(Brazil) Internacional	Loan
29 July 2022	Lorenzo Loria	Pisa	Frosinone	Loan
29 July 2022	Nicholas Siega	Pisa	Südtirol	Undisclosed
29 July 2022	Edoardo Pierozzi	Fiorentina	Palermo	Loan
29 July 2022	(Chile) Erick Pulgar	Fiorentina	(Brazil) Flamengo	Undisclosed
29 July 2022	Daniel Maldini	Milan	Spezia	Loan
29 July 2022	Luca Pandolfi	Cosenza	Juve Stabia	Loan
29 July 2022	Simone Simeri	Bari	Monopoli	Loan
29 July 2022	Gennaro Borrelli	Pescara	Frosinone	Loan
30 July 2022	(Denmark) Jacob Rasmussen	Fiorentina	(Netherlands) Feyenoord	Loan
30 July 2022	(Czech Republic) Daniel Samek	(Czech Republic) Slavia Prague	Lecce	Undisclosed
30 July 2022	Lorenzo Pirola	Inter	Salernitana	Loan
31 July 2022	(Slovenia) Žan Majer	Lecce	Reggina	Undisclosed
31 July 2022	Federico Di Francesco	S.P.A.L.	Lecce	Undisclosed
31 July 2022	Alessandro Lai	Lamezia Terme	Cosenza	Undisclosed
1 August 2022	(Spain) Cesc Fàbregas	Monaco	Como	Free
1 August 2022	(Romania) Adrian Rus	(Hungary) Fehérvár	Pisa	Undisclosed
1 August 2022	(Serbia) Filip Đuričić	Sassuolo	Sampdoria	Free
1 August 2022	(Wales) Aaron Ramsey	Juventus	(France) Nice	Free
1 August 2022	(Uruguay) Matías Vecino	Inter	Lazio	Free
1 August 2022	(Austria) Valentino Lazaro	Inter	Torino	Loan
1 August 2022	(Ivory Coast) Ben Lhassine Kone	Torino	Frosinone	Loan
2 August 2022	(Cyprus) Grigoris Kastanos	Juventus	Salernitana	Undisclosed
2 August 2022	Christian Langella	Pisa	Audace Cerignola	Undisclosed
2 August 2022	(Portugal) Tomás Esteves	(Portugal) Porto	Pisa	Undisclosed
2 August 2022	(Belgium) Charles De Ketelaere	(Belgium) Club Brugge	Milan	Undisclosed
2 August 2022	(Ukraine) Viktor Kovalenko	Atalanta	Spezia	Loan
2 August 2022	(Paraguay) Federico Santander	Bologna	Reggina	Free
3 August 2022	Gabriele Gori	Fiorentina	Reggina	Loan
3 August 2022	(Slovenia) Matija Boben	Ternana	Pescara	Undisclosed
3 August 2022	Mattia Viti	Empoli	(France) Nice	Undisclosed
3 August 2022	(France) Daouda Weidmann	(France) PSG	Torino	Undisclosed
3 August 2022	Simone Perilli	Brescia	Verona	Free
3 August 2022	Christian Capone	Atalanta	Südtirol	Loan
3 August 2022	Alessio Tribuzzi	Frosinone	Crotone	Undisclosed
4 August 2022	Luca Gozzo	Crotone	Frosinone	Loan
4 August 2022	Nicolò Cambiaghi	Atalanta	Empoli	Loan
4 August 2022	(Nigeria) Ademola Lookman	(Germany) RB Leipzig	Atalanta	Undisclosed
4 August 2022	(Zambia) Lameck Banda	(Russia) Arsenal Tula	Lecce	Undisclosed
4 August 2022	(Romania) Olimpiu Moruțan	(Turkey) Galatasaray	Pisa	Loan
4 August 2022	Lorenzo Lucca	Pisa	(Netherlands) Ajax	Loan
5 August 2022	(Serbia) Mladen Devetak	(Serbia) Vojvodina	Atalanta	Undisclosed
5 August 2022	(Guinea) Moustapha Cissé	Atalanta	Pisa	Loan
5 August 2022	(Serbia) Miloš Bočić	Pescara	Frosinone	Loan
5 August 2022	(Austria) Emanuel Aiwu	(Austria) Rapid Wien	Cremonese	Undisclosed
5 August 2022	(Brazil) Marlon	(Ukraine) Shakhtar Donetsk	Monza	Loan
5 August 2022	(Netherlands) Georginio Wijnaldum	(France) PSG	Roma	Loan
5 August 2022	(France) Jordan Veretout	Roma	(France) Marseille	Undisclosed
6 August 2022	Ramzi Aya	Reggina	Avellino	Undisclosed
6 August 2022	Mauro Coppolaro	Virtus Entella	Modena	Undisclosed
6 August 2022	(Portugal) Herculano Nabian	(Portugal) Vitória	Empoli	Loan
6 August 2022	(Turkey) Mert Çetin	Verona	Lecce	Loan
7 August 2022	Marco Brescianini	Milan	Cosenza	Loan
7 August 2022	(Netherlands) Sam Lammers	Atalanta	Empoli	Loan
7 August 2022	(Serbia) Mihailo Ivanović	(Serbia) Vojvodina	Sampdoria	Loan
8 August 2022	Gabriele Capanni	Milan	Ternana	Undisclosed
8 August 2022	Ivan Provedel	Spezia	Lazio	Undisclosed
8 August 2022	(Belgium) Dries Mertens	Napoli	(Turkey) Galatasaray	Free
8 August 2022	(Spain) Gonzalo Villar	Roma	Sampdoria	Loan
9 August 2022	Mirko Gori	Frosinone	Triestina	Undisclosed
9 August 2022	Daniele Baselli	Cagliari	Como	Free
9 August 2022	Arturo Calabresi	Lecce	Pisa	Undisclosed
9 August 2022	(Argentina) Gonzalo Escalante	Lazio	Cremonese	Loan
9 August 2022	(Spain) Carles Pérez	Roma	(Spain) Celta	Loan
9 August 2022	(Senegal) Mamadou Coulibaly	Salernitana	Ternana	Loan
9 August 2022	(Nigeria) Kingsley Michael	Bologna	(Austria) Ried	Loan
9 August 2022	(Chile) Alexis Sánchez	Inter	(France) Marseille	Free
10 August 2022	(Turkey) Emirhan İlkhan	(Turkey) Beşiktaş	Torino	Undisclosed
10 August 2022	(Venezuela) Telasco Segovia	(Venezuela) Deportivo Lara	Sampdoria	Undisclosed
10 August 2022	(Denmark) Mikkel Damsgaard	Sampdoria	(England) Brentford	Undisclosed
10 August 2022	(Poland) Bartłomiej Drągowski	Fiorentina	Spezia	Undisclosed
10 August 2022	(Ivory Coast) Cedric Gondo	Cremonese	Ascoli	Loan
10 August 2022	(Georgia (country)) Luka Lochoshvili	(Austria) Wolfsberger AC	Cremonese	Undisclosed
10 August 2022	(Nigeria) Cyriel Dessers	(Belgium) Genk	Cremonese	Undisclosed
10 August 2022	(Netherlands) Tonny Vilhena	(Spain) Espanyol	Salernitana	Loan
10 August 2022	(France) Wylan Cyprien	Parma	(Switzerland) Sion	Loan
11 August 2022	(Ukraine) Nikita Contini	Napoli	Sampdoria	Loan
11 August 2022	Salvatore Sirigu	Genoa	Napoli	Free
11 August 2022	(Russia) Aleksei Miranchuk	Atalanta	Torino	Loan
11 August 2022	(Croatia) Nikola Vlašić	(England) West Ham	Torino	Loan
11 August 2022	(Spain) Pablo Marí	(England) Arsenal	Monza	Loan
11 August 2022	Andrea Pinamonti	Inter	Sassuolo	Loan
11 August 2022	(Moldova) Artur Ioniță	Benevento	Pisa	Undisclosed
11 August 2022	Andrea Oliveri	Atalanta	Frosinone	Loan
11 August 2022	Jacopo Furlan	Empoli	Perugia	Undisclosed
12 August 2022	Andrea Petagna	Napoli	Monza	Loan
12 August 2022	(Belgium) Daan Dierckx	Parma	(Belgium) Genk	Loan
12 August 2022	Luca Pellegrini	Juventus	(Germany) Eintracht Frankfurt	Loan
12 August 2022	(Serbia) Filip Kostić	(Germany) Eintracht Frankfurt	Juventus	€12+3m
12 August 2022	Gianluca Di Chiara	Perugia	Reggina	Undisclosed
12 August 2022	Alberto Dossena	Avellino	Cagliari	Undisclosed
12 August 2022	Vincenzo Millico	Torino	Cagliari	Undisclosed
12 August 2022	Antonio Candreva	Sampdoria	Salernitana	Loan
12 August 2022	(Tunisia) Dylan Bronn	(France) Metz	Salernitana	Undisclosed
12 August 2022	Gianluca Saro	Crotone	Cremonese	Undisclosed
12 August 2022	Andrea Favilli	Genoa	Ternana	Loan
12 August 2022	Francesco De Rose	Palermo	Cesena	Undisclosed
13 August 2022	(The Gambia) Ebrima Colley	Atalanta	(Turkey) Karagümrük	Loan
14 August 2022	(Switzerland) Remo Freuler	Atalanta	(England) Nottingham Forest	Undisclosed
16 August 2022	Giulio Maggiore	Spezia	Salernitana	Undisclosed
16 August 2022	Francesco Di Mariano	Lecce	Palermo	Undisclosed
16 August 2022	Destiny Udogie	Udinese	(England) Tottenham	Undisclosed
16 August 2022	Destiny Udogie	(England) Tottenham	Udinese	Loan
17 August 2022	(Uruguay) Joaquín Sosa	(Uruguay) Nacional	Bologna	Undisclosed
17 August 2022	Alberto Grassi	Parma	Empoli	Loan
17 August 2022	Marco Tumminello	Atalanta	Crotone	Undisclosed
18 August 2022	(Slovenia) Leo Štulac	Empoli	Palermo	Loan
18 August 2022	Gregorio Luperini	Palermo	Perugia	Undisclosed
18 August 2022	(Colombia) Jhon Lucumí	(Belgium) Genk	Bologna	Undisclosed
18 August 2022	(Argentina) Giovanni Simeone	Verona	Napoli	Loan
18 August 2022	(France) Mattéo Tramoni	Cagliari	Pisa	Undisclosed
18 August 2022	(France) Lisandru Tramoni	Cagliari	Pisa	Undisclosed
18 August 2022	(Senegal) Boulaye Dia	(Spain) Villarreal	Salernitana	Loan
18 August 2022	(Netherlands) Perr Schuurs	(Netherlands) Ajax	Torino	Undisclosed
18 August 2022	(Portugal) Pedro Pereira	Monza	(Turkey) Alanyaspor	Loan
18 August 2022	Filippo Nardi	Cremonese	Reggiana	Loan
18 August 2022	Luca Strizzolo	Cremonese	Perugia	Loan
18 August 2022	Davide Merola	Empoli	Cosenza	Loan
18 August 2022	Leonardo Marson	Vibonese	Cosenza	Free
19 August 2022	(Finland) Joel Pohjanpalo	(Germany) Bayer Leverkusen	Venezia	Undisclosed
19 August 2022	(France) Tanguy Ndombele	(England) Tottenham	Napoli	Loan
19 August 2022	Cesare Casadei	Inter	(England) Chelsea	Undisclosed
19 August 2022	(France) Brandon Soppy	Udinese	Atalanta	Undisclosed
19 August 2022	Davide Bettella	Monza	Palermo	Loan
19 August 2022	Paolo Gozzi	Genoa	Cosenza	Loan
19 August 2022	Luca Vignali	Spezia	Como	Undisclosed
19 August 2022	Nicolas Izzillo	Pisa	Pontedera	Loan
20 August 2022	Federico Proia	Vicenza	S.P.A.L.	Loan
20 August 2022	(Colombia) Juan David Cabal	(Colombia) Atlético Nacional	Verona	Undisclosed
20 August 2022	Giacomo Raspadori	Sassuolo	Napoli	Loan
20 August 2022	Elia Giani	Pisa	Fiorenzuola	Loan
20 August 2022	Christian Sussi	Pisa	Fiorenzuola	Loan
22 August 2022	(Mexico) Teun Wilke Braams	S.P.A.L.	(Belgium) Cercle Brugge	Loan
22 August 2022	(Croatia) Marin Pongračić	(Germany) VfL Wolfsburg	Lecce	Loan
22 August 2022	(Argentina) Cristian Ansaldi	Torino	Parma	Free
23 August 2022	(Spain) Raúl Moro	Lazio	Ternana	Loan
23 August 2022	(Slovenia) Žan Žužek	(Slovenia) Koper	Bari	Loan
23 August 2022	(Burkina Faso) Abdoul Guiebre	Monopoli	Modena	Loan
23 August 2022	(Slovenia) Aaron Kačinari	(Slovenia) Tabor Sežana	Venezia	Undisclosed
23 August 2022	(Ivory Coast) Hassane Kamara	(England) Watford	Udinese	Undisclosed
23 August 2022	(Ivory Coast) Hassane Kamara	Udinese	(England) Watford	Loan
23 August 2022	Alexis Ferrante	Ternana	Cesena	Loan
23 August 2022	Luca Mazzitelli	Monza	Frosinone	Loan
23 August 2022	Jacopo Segre	Torino	Palermo	Undisclosed
23 August 2022	Giacomo Corona	Palermo	Torino	Loan
24 August 2022	Mario Sampirisi	Monza	Frosinone	Loan
24 August 2022	Mattia Minesso	Modena	Triestina	Undisclosed
24 August 2022	Matteo Ciofani	Modena	Triestina	Undisclosed
24 August 2022	Filippo D'Andrea	Salernitana	Cerignola	Undisclosed
25 August 2022	Federico Viviani	S.P.A.L.	Brescia	Undisclosed
25 August 2022	(France) Samuel Umtiti	(Spain) Barcelona	Lecce	Loan
25 August 2022	(Portugal) Vivaldo Semedo	(Portugal) Sporting	Udinese	Undisclosed
25 August 2022	Antonio Barreca	Monaco	Cagliari	Free
25 August 2022	Antonio Candela	Genoa	Venezia	Undisclosed
25 August 2022	Mattia Aramu	Venezia	Genoa	Loan
25 August 2022	(Netherlands) Kevin Strootman	(France) Marseille	Genoa	Loan
25 August 2022	(Romania) George Pușcaș	(England) Reading	Genoa	Loan
26 August 2022	(Sweden) Alexander Jallow	(Sweden) Göteborg	Brescia	Undisclosed
26 August 2022	(Poland) Arkadiusz Milik	(France) Marseille	Juventus	Loan
26 August 2022	(Libya) Ahmad Benali	Crotone	Brescia	Undisclosed
26 August 2022	(Ghana) Raymond Asante	(Ghana) Young Apostles	Udinese	Undisclosed
26 August 2022	(Czech Republic) Antonín Barák	Verona	Fiorentina	Loan
26 August 2022	(Sierra Leone) Yayah Kallon	Genoa	Verona	Loan
26 August 2022	Salvatore Boccia	Cagliari	Turris	Loan
26 August 2022	Giuseppe Pezzella	Parma	Lecce	Loan
26 August 2022	Luca Ravanelli	Cremonese	Frosinone	Loan
26 August 2022	Andrea Silipo	Palermo	Juve Stabia	Loan
26 August 2022	Aleš Matějů	Venezia	Palermo	Free
27 August 2022	Federico Pace	Campobasso	Brescia	Free
27 August 2022	Paolo Faragò	Cagliari	Como	Undisclosed
27 August 2022	(Sweden) Isak Hien	(Sweden) Djurgården	Verona	Undisclosed
27 August 2022	(Denmark) Rasmus Højlund	(Austria) Sturm Graz	Atalanta	Undisclosed
27 August 2022	(Albania) Frédéric Veseli	Salernitana	Benevento	Undisclosed
27 August 2022	Michele Cavion	Salernitana	Vicenza	Undisclosed
27 August 2022	Camillo Ciano	Frosinone	Benevento	Undisclosed
27 August 2022	Roberto Insigne	Benevento	Frosinone	Undisclosed
27 August 2022	Michele Vano	Perugia	Rimini	Loan
28 August 2022	Andrea Belotti	Torino	Roma	Free
29 August 2022	(Croatia) Nikola Moro	(Russia) Dynamo Moscow	Bologna	Loan
29 August 2022	(Portugal) Pedro Mendes	(Portugal) Sporting	Ascoli	Loan
29 August 2022	Patrick Cutrone	(England) Wolverhampton	Como	Undisclosed
29 August 2022	(Tunisia) Wajdi Kechrida	Salernitana	(Greece) Atromitos	Undisclosed
29 August 2022	(Albania) Elvis Kabashi	Como	Reggiana	Undisclosed
29 August 2022	(Austria) Flavius Daniliuc	(France) Nice	Salernitana	Undisclosed
29 August 2022	(Poland) Krzysztof Kubica	(Poland) Górnik Zabrze	Benevento	Undisclosed
29 August 2022	(Nigeria) Kingsley Ehizibue	(Germany) 1. FC Köln	Udinese	Undisclosed
29 August 2022	(Germany) Malick Thiaw	(Germany) Schalke 04	Milan	Undisclosed
29 August 2022	(Ghana) Felix Afena-Gyan	Roma	Cremonese	Undisclosed
29 August 2022	(Serbia) Bogdan Jočić	Verona	(Serbia) Voždovac	Undisclosed
30 August 2022	(Netherlands) Joshua Zirkzee	(Germany) Bayern Munich	Bologna	Undisclosed
30 August 2022	(Argentina) Cristian Romero	Atalanta	(England) Tottenham	Undisclosed
30 August 2022	(Democratic Republic of the Congo) Gabriel Charpentier	Genoa	Parma	Undisclosed
30 August 2022	Andrea Beghetto	Pisa	Perugia	Loan
30 August 2022	(England) Harry Winks	(England) Tottenham	Sampdoria	Loan
30 August 2022	(Croatia) Dario Šarić	Ascoli	Palermo	Undisclosed
30 August 2022	(Ivory Coast) Alassane Sidibe	Atalanta	Cosenza	Loan
30 August 2022	Alessandro Marotta	Modena	Viterbese	Undisclosed
30 August 2022	(Brazil) Felipe Vizeu	Udinese	(Moldova) Sheriff	Undisclosed
30 August 2022	(Spain) Fabián Ruiz	Napoli	(France) PSG	Undisclosed
30 August 2022	Luca Chierico	Genoa	Foggia	Loan
31 August 2022	Alessandro Fiordaliso	Cremonese	S.P.A.L.	Undisclosed
31 August 2022	Luca Valzania	Cremonese	S.P.A.L.	Loan
31 August 2022	Marco Carnesecchi	Atalanta	Cremonese	Loan
31 August 2022	Gabriel Lunetta	Atalanta	(Croatia) Rijeka	Undisclosed
31 August 2022	(Greece) Panagiotis Retsos	Verona	(Greece) Olympiacos	Loan
31 August 2022	(Poland) Mariusz Stępiński	Verona	(Cyprus) Aris Limassol	Undisclosed
31 August 2022	(Russia) Aleksandr Kokorin	Fiorentina	(Cyprus) Aris Limassol	Loan
31 August 2022	(France) Eddy Gnahoré	(France) Amiens	Ascoli	Undisclosed
31 August 2022	(Guinea) Mady Camara	(Greece) Olympiacos	Roma	Undisclosed
31 August 2022	(Guinea) Amadou Diawara	Roma	(Belgium) Anderlecht	Undisclosed
31 August 2022	Riccardo Calafiori	Roma	(Switzerland) Basel	Undisclosed
31 August 2022	Nicolò Rovella	Juventus	Monza	Loan
31 August 2022	(Argentina) Leandro Paredes	(France) PSG	Juventus	Loan
31 August 2022	Camillo Tavernelli	Cittadella	Novara	Loan
31 August 2022	Andrea Magrassi	Virtus Entella	Cittadella	Undisclosed
31 August 2022	(France) Janis Antiste	Spezia	Sassuolo	Loan
31 August 2022	(France) Armand Laurienté	(France) Lorient	Sassuolo	Undisclosed
31 August 2022	(Poland) Paweł Jaroszyński	Salernitana	(Poland) Cracovia	Loan
31 August 2022	(Netherlands) Reda Boultam	Salernitana	(Croatia) Istra	Loan
31 August 2022	(Russia) Denis Cheryshev	(Spain) Valencia	Venezia	Free
31 August 2022	Filippo Melegoni	Genoa	(Belgium) Standard Liège	Loan
31 August 2022	(France) Rémi Oudin	(France) Bordeaux	Lecce	Loan
31 August 2022	Daniele Iacoponi	Parma	Foggia	Loan
1 September 2022	Samuele Angori	Perugia	Empoli	Loan
1 September 2022	(Croatia) Marko Pjaca	Juventus	Empoli	Loan
1 September 2022	Giovanni Crociata	Empoli	Südtirol	Loan
1 September 2022	(Australia) Ajdin Hrustic	(Germany) Eintracht Frankfurt	Verona	Undisclosed
1 September 2022	(Scotland) Jack Hendry	(Belgium) Club Brugge	Cremonese	Loan
1 September 2022	Samuel Di Carmine	Cremonese	Perugia	Undisclosed
1 September 2022	Paolo Bartolomei	Cremonese	Perugia	Undisclosed
1 September 2022	Filippo Costa	Napoli	Foggia	Loan
1 September 2022	Simone Verdi	Torino	Verona	Loan
1 September 2022	(Austria) Stefan Posch	(Germany) TSG 1899 Hoffenheim	Bologna	Loan
1 September 2022	(Poland) Krzysztof Piątek	(Germany) Hertha	Salernitana	Loan
1 September 2022	(Nigeria) Simy	Salernitana	Benevento	Loan
1 September 2022	Valerio Mantovani	Salernitana	Ternana	Loan
1 September 2022	Edoardo Vergani	Salernitana	Pescara	Undisclosed
1 September 2022	(Slovakia) Ľubomír Tupta	Verona	Pescara	Undisclosed
1 September 2022	Devid Bouah	Roma	Reggina	Undisclosed
1 September 2022	(Croatia) Mario Šitum	Reggina	Catanzaro	Undisclosed
1 September 2022	Lorenzo Lollo	Reggina	Triestina	Undisclosed
1 September 2022	Marco Carraro	Atalanta	Crotone	Loan
1 September 2022	Luca Vido	Atalanta	Palermo	Loan
1 September 2022	(Slovenia) Aaron Kačinari	Venezia	(Albania) Kastrioti	Loan
1 September 2022	(Croatia) Filip Benković	Udinese	(Germany) Eintracht Braunschweig	Loan
1 September 2022	(Norway) Martin Palumbo	Udinese	Juventus	Loan
1 September 2022	(Brazil) Arthur	Juventus	(England) Liverpool	Loan
1 September 2022	(Switzerland) Denis Zakaria	Juventus	(England) Chelsea	Loan
1 September 2022	Gianluca Frabotta	Juventus	Frosinone	Loan
1 September 2022	Hamza Haoudi	Frosinone	Turris	Loan
1 September 2022	(Malta) Alexander Satariano	Frosinone	(Malta) Balzan	Loan
1 September 2022	Manuele Castorani	Ascoli	Siena	Loan
1 September 2022	Claud Adjapong	Sassuolo	Ascoli	Undisclosed
1 September 2022	Marco Pinato	Sassuolo	Pordenone	Undisclosed
1 September 2022	(France) Yann Karamoh	Parma	Torino	Undisclosed
1 September 2022	Gabriele Ferrarini	Fiorentina	Monza	Loan
1 September 2022	Armando Izzo	Torino	Monza	Loan
1 September 2022	(Romania) Andrei David	Fiorentina	Piacenza	Undisclosed
1 September 2022	(Serbia) Matija Nastasić	Fiorentina	(Spain) Mallorca	Undisclosed
1 September 2022	(Netherlands) Justin Kluivert	Roma	(Spain) Valencia	Loan
1 September 2022	(Slovakia) Samuel Mráz	Spezia	(Spain) Mirandés	Loan
1 September 2022	(Wales) Ethan Ampadu	(England) Chelsea	Spezia	Loan
1 September 2022	(United States) Sergiño Dest	(Spain) Barcelona	Milan	Loan
1 September 2022	(Belgium) Aster Vranckx	(Germany) VfL Wolfsburg	Milan	Loan
1 September 2022	Francesco Acerbi	Lazio	Inter	Loan
1 September 2022	Eddie Salcedo	Inter	Bari	Loan
1 September 2022	(France) Aurélien Scheidler	(France) Dijon	Bari	Undisclosed
1 September 2022	Raffaele Bianco	Bari	Cerignola	Undisclosed
1 September 2022	Carlo De Risio	Bari	Monopoli	Undisclosed
1 September 2022	Marco Perrotta	Bari	Pro Vercelli	Loan
1 September 2022	Daniele Celiento	Bari	Cesena	Loan
1 September 2022	(Denmark) Riza Durmisi	Lazio	(Spain) Leganés	Loan
1 September 2022	Alessandro Rossi	Lazio	Monterosi	Loan
1 September 2022	Biagio Morrone	Lazio	Recanatese	Undisclosed
1 September 2022	(Poland) Patryk Dziczek	Lazio	(Poland) Piast Gliwice	Undisclosed
1 September 2022	(Netherlands) Djavan Anderson	Lazio	(England) Oxford United	Loan
1 September 2022	Leandro Pratelli	Empoli	AlbinoLeffe	Loan
1 September 2022	(Ivory Coast) Jean-Daniel Akpa Akpro	Lazio	Empoli	Loan
1 September 2022	(Poland) Sebastian Walukiewicz	Cagliari	Empoli	Loan
1 September 2022	Jacopo Desogus	Cagliari	Pescara	Loan
1 September 2022	Davide Veroli	Pescara	Cagliari	Undisclosed
1 September 2022	Elio Capradossi	Spezia	Cagliari	Undisclosed
1 September 2022	(Slovakia) Adam Griger	(Austria) LASK	Cagliari	Loan
1 September 2022	Filippo Falco	(Serbia) Red Star Belgrade	Cagliari	Loan
1 September 2022	Carmine Iannone	Salernitana	Messina	Undisclosed
1 September 2022	(Argentina) Ignacio Pussetto	Watford	Sampdoria	Loan
1 September 2022	(Argentina) Bruno Amione	Verona	Sampdoria	Loan
1 September 2022	Fabio Depaoli	Sampdoria	Verona	Loan
1 September 2022	Matteo Stoppa	Sampdoria	Vicenza	Loan
1 September 2022	Marco Bontempi	Sampdoria	Arzignano	Loan
1 September 2022	Giovanni Gaffi	Sampdoria	Pisa	Loan
1 September 2022	Lorenzo Di Stefano	Sampdoria	Gubbio	Loan
1 September 2022	(France) Claudio Gomes	(England) Manchester City	Palermo	Undisclosed
1 September 2022	(France) Soualiho Meïté	(Portugal) Benfica	Cremonese	Loan
1 September 2022	(Romania) Dennis Politic	Cremonese	(England) Port Vale	Undisclosed
1 September 2022	(Denmark) Emil Kornvig	Spezia	Cosenza	Loan
1 September 2022	Agostino Camigliano	Cosenza	Reggiana	Undisclosed
1 September 2022	(Bulgaria) Andrea Hristov	Cosenza	Reggiana	Loan
1 September 2022	Mauro Vigorito	Cosenza	Como	Loan
1 September 2022	Jacopo Da Riva	Atalanta	Como	Loan
1 September 2022	Ettore Gliozzi	Como	Pisa	Undisclosed
1 September 2022	Davide Bertoncini	Como	Novara	Undisclosed
1 September 2022	Edoardo Bovolon	Como	San Donato Tavarnelle	Undisclosed
1 September 2022	Giuseppe Ambrosino	Napoli	Como	Loan
1 September 2022	(Algeria) Adam Ounas	Napoli	(France) Lille	Undisclosed
1 September 2022	(France) Lucien Agoumé	Inter	(France) Troyes	Loan
1 September 2022	Simone Icardi	Cittadella	FeralpiSalò	Loan
1 September 2022	Adriano Montalto	Reggina	Reggiana	Loan
1 September 2022	(Brazil) Hernani	Parma	Reggina	Loan
1 September 2022	Pasquale Schiattarella	Parma	Benevento	Undisclosed
1 September 2022	(France) Maxime Leverbe	Pisa	Benevento	Loan
1 September 2022	Federico Barba	Benevento	Pisa	Undisclosed
1 September 2022	Angelo Talia	Benevento	Potenza	Loan
2 September 2022	(Morocco) Sofian Kiyine	Lazio	(Belgium) OH Leuven	Undisclosed
2 September 2022	(Israel) Suf Podgoreanu	Spezia	(Israel) Maccabi Haifa	Loan
2 September 2022	(Netherlands) Mitchell Dijks	Bologna	(Netherlands) Vitesse	Free
2 September 2022	Andrea Schiavone	Salernitana	Südtirol	Free
5 September 2022	Andrea Masiello	Unattached	Südtirol	Free
8 September 2022	(Switzerland) Noam Baumann	Unattached	Ascoli	Free
16 September 2022	(Senegal) Ibrahima Mbaye	Bologna	(Romania) Cluj	Free
