= 2023–24 AS Gubbio 1910 season =

Gubbio
2023–24 season
- Manager: Piero Braglia
- Stadium: Stadio Pietro Barbetti
- Serie C: 5th
- Coppa Italia Serie C: First round
- Biggest win: Gubbio 5–2 Sestri Levante

The 2023–24 AS Gubbio 1910 season is the club's 114th season in history and the eighth in a row in the Serie C. This is the second consecutive season under head coach Piero Braglia.

== Pre-season ==
4 August 2023 Friendly	Gubbio	0–3	Parma

26 August 2023 Friendly	Gubbio	1–1	Sambenedettese

== Competitions ==
=== Overall record ===
Competition	First match	Last match	Starting round	Final position	Record							
Competition	First match	Last match	Starting round	Final position	Pld	W	D	L	GF	GA	GD	Win %
Serie C	1 September 2023	28 April 2024	Matchday 1		29	13	9	7	40	27	+13	44.83
Coppa Italia Serie C	5 October 2023		First round	First round	1	0	0	1	0	1	−1	0.00
Total					30	13	9	8	40	28	+12	43.33

Last updated: 2 March 2024
Source: Competitions

=== Serie C ===
==== League table ====
Pos	Team	Pld	W	D	L	GF	GA	GD	Pts	Qualification
3	Carrarese (O, P)	38	21	10	7	54	30	+24	73	National play-offs 1st round
4	Perugia	38	17	12	9	44	35	+9	63	Group play-offs 2nd round
5	Gubbio	38	16	11	11	50	38	+12	59	Group play-offs 1st round
6	Pescara	38	16	7	15	60	55	+5	55	Group play-offs 1st round
7	Juventus Next Gen	38	15	9	14	50	44	+6	54	Group play-offs 1st round

Updated to match(es) played on 28 April 2024. Source: Lega Pro, Soccerway (in English)
Rules for classification: 1) Points; 2) Head-to-head points; 3) Head-to-head goal difference; 4) Goal difference; 5) Goals scored; 6) Lower goals against; 7) Wins; 8) Lower losses; 9) Away wins; 10) Lower home losses.
(Note: Head-to-head record is used only after all the matches between the teams in question have been played)
(O) Play-off winners; (P) Promoted

==== Results summary ====
Overall								Home						Away					
Pld	W	D	L	GF	GA	GD	Pts	W	D	L	GF	GA	GD	W	D	L	GF	GA	GD
38	16	11	11	50	38	+12	59	10	8	1	27	7	+20	6	3	10	23	31	−8

==== Results by round ====
Round	1	2	3	4	5	6	7	8	9	10	11	12	13	14	15	16	17	18	19	20	21	22	23	24	25	26	27	28	29
Ground	H	A	H	A	H	A	H	A	H	H	A	H	A	H	A	H	A	H	A	A	H	A	H	A	H	A	H	A	A
Result	D	W	D	D	W	L	W	L	W	D	L	D	L	W	L	D	L	W	W	W	D	W	W	W	W	L	D	W	D
Position	8	5	7	8	6	7	7	8	6	6	7	8	10	8	8	9	10	8	7	7	7	7	6	6	4	5	5	5	

Updated to match(es) played on 2 March 2024. Source:
A = Away; H = Home; W = Win; D = Draw; L = Loss

==== Matches ====
The league fixtures were unveiled on 7 August 2023.

1 September 2023 1	Gubbio	1–1	Pineto	Gubbio
				Stadium: Stadio Pietro Barbetti

9 September 2023 2	Ancona	1–2	Gubbio	Ancona

16 September 2023 3	Gubbio	0–0	Fermana	Gubbio
				Stadium: Stadio Pietro Barbetti

19 September 2023 4	Lucchese	0–0	Gubbio	Lucca

23 September 2023 5	Gubbio	1–0	Vis Pesaro	Gubbio
				Stadium: Stadio Pietro Barbetti

2 October 2023 6	Pescara	3–2	Gubbio	Pescara

9 October 2023 7	Gubbio	2–0	Carrarese	Gubbio
				Stadium: Stadio Pietro Barbetti

15 October 2023 8	Virtus Entella	2–1	Gubbio	Chiavari

22 October 2023 9	Gubbio	1–0	Olbia	Gubbio
				Stadium: Stadio Pietro Barbetti

25 October 2023 10	Gubbio	1–1	Juventus Next Gen	Gubbio
				Stadium: Stadio Pietro Barbetti

30 October 2023 11	Arezzo	1–0	Gubbio	Arezzo

5 November 2023 12	Gubbio	1–1	Cesena	Gubbio
				Stadium: Stadio Pietro Barbetti

12 November 2023 13	Perugia	1–0	Gubbio	Perugia

19 November 2023 14	Gubbio	5–2	Sestri Levante	Gubbio
				Stadium: Stadio Pietro Barbetti

26 November 2023 15	Torres	3–1	Gubbio	Sassari

2 December 2023 16	Gubbio	0–0	SPAL	Gubbio
				Stadium: Stadio Pietro Barbetti

9 December 2023 17	Pontedera	2–1	Gubbio	Pontedera

22 December 2023 19	Rimini	1–2	Gubbio	Rimini

7 January 2024 20	Pineto	1–2	Gubbio	Pineto

10 January 2024 18	Gubbio	3–1	Recanatese	Gubbio
				Stadium: Stadio Pietro Barbetti

14 January 2024 21	Gubbio	0–0	Ancona	Gubbio
				Stadium: Stadio Pietro Barbetti

21 January 2024 22	Fermana	0–2	Gubbio	Fermi

28 January 2024 23	Gubbio	1–0	Lucchese	Gubbio
				Stadium: Stadio Pietro Barbetti

2 February 2024 24	Vis Pesaro	1–3	Gubbio	Pesaro

9 February 2024 25	Gubbio	4–0	Pescara	Gubbio
				Stadium: Stadio Pietro Barbetti

14 February 2024 26	Carrarese	2–0	Gubbio	Carrara

19 February 2024 27	Gubbio	0–0	Virtus Entella	Gubbio
				Stadium: Stadio Pietro Barbetti

25 February 2024 28	Olbia	1–2	Gubbio	Olbia

2 March 2024 29	Juventus Next Gen	2–2	Gubbio	Alessandria

=== Coppa Italia Serie C ===
5 October 2023 First round	Rimini	1–0	Gubbio	Rimini
20:45 CEST (UTC+2)	Morra 90+6'			Stadium: Stadio Romeo Neri; Attendance: 741; Referee: Cristiano Ursini
