= 2024–25 LR Vicenza season =

LR Vicenza
2024–25 season
- Manager: Stefano Vecchi
- Stadium: Stadio Romeo Menti
- Serie C Group A: 2nd
- Promotion play-offs: Semi-finals
- Coppa Italia Serie C: Round of 16
- Top goalscorer: League: Claudio Morra (13); All: Claudio Morra (13)

During the 2024–25 season, L.R. Vicenza competed in Serie C for the third consecutive year, as well as in the Coppa Italia Serie C. The club concluded the league campaign in second place, thereby securing qualification for the promotion play-offs.

== Transfers ==
=== In ===
Pos.	Player	Transferred from	Fee	Date	Source
FW	(Italy) Claudio Morra	(Italy) Rimini	Undisclosed	11 July 2024	
FW	(Italy) Nicola Rauti	(Italy) Torino	Loan	20 July 2024	
MF	(Italy) Marco Carraro	(Italy) SPAL	Free	25 July 2024	
DF	(France) Maxime Leverbe	(Italy) Pisa	Undisclosed	20 August 2024	
MF	(Italy) Christian Capone	(Italy) Atalanta U23	Loan	30 August 2024	
MF	(Italy) Simone Della Latta	(Italy) Carrarese	Undisclosed	30 August 2024	
DF	(Italy) Andrea Beghetto	(Italy) Pisa	Loan	21 January 2025	

== Competitions ==
=== Overall record ===
Competition	First match	Last match	Starting round	Final position	Record							
Competition	First match	Last match	Starting round	Final position	Pld	W	D	L	GF	GA	GD	Win %
Serie C	25 August 2024	25 April 2025	Matchday 1	2nd	38	25	8	5	59	24	+35	65.79
Promotion play-offs	18 May 2025				3	2	1	0	3	1	+2	66.67
Coppa Italia Serie C	11 August 2024	27 November 2024	First round	Round of 16	3	2	0	1	5	4	+1	66.67
Total					44	29	9	6	67	29	+38	65.91

Last updated: 25 May 2025
Source: Competitions

=== Serie C ===
Group A

==== Results summary ====
Overall								Home						Away					
Pld	W	D	L	GF	GA	GD	Pts	W	D	L	GF	GA	GD	W	D	L	GF	GA	GD
38	25	8	5	59	24	+35	83	16	3	0	38	7	+31	9	5	5	21	17	+4

==== Results by round ====
Round	1	2	3	4	5	6	7	8	9	10	11	12	13	14	15	16	17	18	19	20	21	22	23	24	25	26	27	28	29	30	31	32	33	34	35	36	37	38
Ground	H	A	A	H	A	H	H	A	H	A	H	A	H	A	H	A	H	A	H	A	H	H	A	H	A	A	H	A	H	A	H	A	H	A	H	A	H	A
Result	D	W	D	W	W	W	W	L	D	W	W	D	W	W	W	W	W	L	W	D	W	W	W	W	W	L	D	W	W	D	W	D	W	W	W	L	W	L
Position																																						

A = Away; H = Home; W = Win; D = Draw; L = Loss

==== Matches ====
25 August 2024 1	Vicenza	2–2	Giana Erminio

1 September 2024 2	Pergolettese	0–1	Vicenza

7 September 2024 3	AlbinoLeffe	1–1	Vicenza

15 September 2024 4	Vicenza	2–0	Pro Patria

21 September 2024 5	Alcione Milano	1–2	Vicenza

24 September 2024 6	Vicenza	1–0	Renate

28 September 2024 7	Vicenza	1–0	Feralpisalò

6 October 2024 8	Padova	1–0	Vicenza

13 October 2024 9	Vicenza	1–1	Lumezzane

19 October 2024 10	Arzignano Valchiampo	1–2	Vicenza

26 October 2024 11	Vicenza	3–0	Atalanta U23

29 October 2024 12	Novara	0–0	Vicenza

4 November 2024 13	Vicenza	1–0	Lecco

9 November 2024 14	Caldiero Terme	0–2	Vicenza

17 November 2024 15	Vicenza	2–0	Pro Vercelli

22 November 2024 16	Union Clodiense	1–2	Vicenza

1 December 2024 17	Vicenza	3–0	Virtus Verona

8 December 2024 18	Triestina	2–0	Vicenza

13 December 2024 19	Vicenza	3–0	Trento

22 December 2024 20	Giana Erminio	0–0	Vicenza

6 January 2025 21	Vicenza	2–0	Pergolettese

12 January 2025 22	Vicenza	2–0	AlbinoLeffe

19 January 2025 23	Pro Patria	0–3	Vicenza

26 January 2025 24	Vicenza	4–1	Alcione Milano

1 February 2025 25	Renate	0–1	Vicenza

9 February 2025 26	Feralpisalò	2–0	Vicenza

16 February 2025 27	Vicenza	1–1	Padova

23 February 2025 28	Lumezzane	0–1	Vicenza

2 March 2025 29	Vicenza	4–0	Arzignano Valchiampo

9 March 2025 30	Atalanta U23	0–0	Vicenza

13 March 2025 31	Vicenza	1–0	Novara

17 March 2025 32	Lecco	1–1	Vicenza

23 March 2025 33	Vicenza	2–1	Caldiero Terme

30 March 2025 34	Pro Vercelli	0–1	Vicenza

6 April 2025 35	Vicenza	2–1	Union Clodiense

13 April 2025 36	Virtus Verona	2–1	Vicenza

18 April 2025 37	Vicenza	1–0	Triestina

25 April 2025 38	Trento	3–1	Vicenza

==== Promotion play-offs ====
18 May 2025 Second round First leg	Crotone	1–2	Vicenza

21 May 2025 Second round Second leg	Vicenza	1–0 (3–1 agg.)	Crotone	Vicenza

25 May 2025 Semi-finals; First leg	Vicenza	0–0	Ternana	Vicenza
15:00				Stadium: Stadio Romeo Menti

28 May 2025 Semi-finals; Second leg	Ternana	v (0–0 agg.)	Vicenza	Terni
20:00				Stadium: Stadio Libero Liberati

=== Coppa Italia Serie C ===
11 August 2024 First round	Legnago Salus	1–2	Vicenza

18 August 2024 Second round	Atalanta U23	1–2	Vicenza

27 November 2024 Round of 16	Vicenza	1–2	Rimini
