= Semeraro =

Semeraro is a surname. Notable people with the surname include:

- Domenico Semeraro (born 1964), Swiss bobsledder
- Francesco Semeraro (born 2001), Italian footballer
- Marcello Semeraro (born 1947), Italian Roman Catholic cardinal
- Paolo Semeraro (born 1962), Italian sailor
- Silvia Semeraro (born 1996), Italian karateka
