= Mario Ierardi =

Italian footballer

Personal information
- Date of birth: 19 February 1998 (age 28)
- Place of birth: Magenta, Italy
- Height: 1.80 m (5 ft 11 in)
- Position: Defender

Team information
- Current team: Catania
- Number: 68

Youth career
- –2014: Pro Patria
- 2014–2015: Reggiana
- 2014–2015: → Genoa (loan)
- 2015–2017: Genoa

Senior career*
Years	Team	Apps	(Gls)
2016–2019	Genoa	0	(0)
2017–2018	→ Ravenna (loan)	14	(0)
2018–2019	→ Südtirol (loan)	25	(0)
2019–2020	Südtirol	23	(2)
2020–2024	Vicenza	48	(5)
2022	→ Pescara (loan)	9	(1)
2024	→ Lecco (loan)	8	(0)
2024–	Catania	55	(7)

International career^{‡}
2016	Italy U-18	4	(0)
2016	Italy U-19	2	(0)
- * Club domestic league appearances and goals as of 1 May 2026 ‡ National team caps and goals as of 6 October 2016

Mario Ierardi (born 19 February 1998) is an Italian professional footballer who plays as a defender for Serie C Group C club Catania.

== Club career ==
=== Genoa ===
Ierardi was a youth product of Geona youth team.

==== Loan to Ravenna ====
On 1 July 2017, Ierardi was signed by Serie C side Ravenna on a season-long loan deal. On 10 September he made his Serie C debut for Ravenna as a substitute replacing Riccardo Barzaghi in the 84th minute of a 5–1 home defeat against Triestina. On 22 September, Ierardi played his first match as a starter for Ravenna, a 1–0 home win over Modena, he was replaced after 81 minute. On 1 October he played his first entire match for Ravenna, a 1–0 away win over Fano. Ierardi ended his season-long loan to Ravenna with only 14 appearances.

==== Loan to Südtirol ====
On 13 July 2018, Ierardi was loaned to Serie C club Südtirol on a season-long loan deal. On 30 July he made his debut for Südtirol in a 2–1 home win over Albalonga in the first round of Coppa Italia, he played the entire match. On 5 August he played in the second round in a 1–0 away win over Venezia. One week later he played in the third round, a 2–0 away win over Frosinone. On 17 September he made his Serie C debut for Südtirol in a 1–0 home win over Teramo, he played the entire match. On 26 December he was sent-off with a double yellow card in the 79th minute of a 1–1 away draw against Monza. Ierardi ended his loan to Südtirol with 31 appearances.

=== Südtirol ===
On 12 July 2019, after the loan, Ierardi joined to Serie C club Südtirol on a free-transfer and he signed a 3-year contract. On 4 August he made his season debut for the club and he also scored his first professional goal in the 74th minute of a 4–1 home win over Città di Fasano in the first round of Coppa Italia, he played the entire match. Three weeks later, on 25 August, he made his league debut with a 2–1 away win over Vis Pesaro, he played the entire match. On 21 September, Ierardi scored his first in Serie C in the 51st minute of a 1–0 away win over Arzignano Valchiampo. On 22 January he scored his second goal for the club in the second minute of a 2–0 home win over Vis Pesaro.

=== Vicenza ===
On 18 August 2020, Ierardi joined to newly promoted Serie B club Vicenza on an undisclosed fee and he signed a 3-year contract.

==== Loan to Pescara ====
On 26 January 2022, he was loaned to Pescara.

==== Loan to Lecco ====
On 31 January 2024, Ierardi was loaned by Serie B club Lecco, with an option to buy.

=== Catania ===
On 16 July 2024, Ierardi signed a two-year contract with Catania.

== International career ==
Ierardi represented Italy at U-18 and U-19 level. On 14 January 2016, Ierardi made his debut at U-18 level in a 6–0 home win over Belgium U-18, he was replaced by Niccolò Tofanari in the 78th minute. On 13 April 2016 he played his first entire match for Italy U-18, a 2–1 home defeat against France U-18. On 11 August 2016, Ierardi made his debut at U-19 level in a 1–0 home defeat against Croatia U-19, he was replaced by Niccolò Tofanari in the 70th minute.

== Career statistics ==
=== Club ===
As of 16 July 2020

Club	Season	League			Cup		Europe		Other		Total	
Club	Season	League	Apps	Goals	Apps	Goals	Apps	Goals	Apps	Goals	Apps	Goals
Ravenna (loan)	2017–18	Serie C	14	0	0	0	—		—		14	0
Südtirol (loan)	2018–19	Serie C	25	0	4	0	—		2 (Note: All appearance(s) in Serie C play-off.)	0	31	0
Südtirol	2019–20	Serie C	23	2	3	1	—		1	0	27	3
Career total			62	2	7	1	—		3	0	72	3
