= Demba Kamara =

Sierra Leonean footballer

Personal information
- Date of birth: 4 May 2003 (age 23)
- Place of birth: Freetown, Sierra Leone
- Height: 1.75 m (5 ft 9 in)
- Position: Midfielder

Youth career
- San Pio X

Senior career*
Years	Team	Apps	(Gls)
2020–2021	Licata	0	(0)
2021	Giarre		
2021–2022	Rimini	4	(0)
2022–2023	San Marino		

International career^{‡}
2022–	Sierra Leone	1	(0)
- * Club domestic league appearances and goals as of 22 May 2022 ‡ National team caps and goals as of 12:57, 11 April 2022 (UTC)

Demba Kamara (born 4 May 2003) is a Sierra Leonean footballer.

== Club career ==
Kamara signed for Serie D side Rimini in August 2021.

== International career ==
He made his international debut for Sierra Leone in a 1–0 win over Liberia in March 2022.

== Career statistics ==
=== Club ===
As of 11 April 2022.

Club	Season	League			Cup		Other		Total	
Club	Season	Division	Apps	Goals	Apps	Goals	Apps	Goals	Apps	Goals
Licata	2020–21	Serie D	0	0	0	0	0	0	0	0
Rimini	2021–22	Serie D	2	0	0	0	0	0	2	0
Career total			2	0	0	0	0	0	2	0

=== International ===
As of matches played 11 April 2022.

Appearances and goals by national team and year
National team	Year	Apps	Goals
Sierra Leone	2022	1	0
Total		1	0
