= Davide Lamesta =

Italian footballer (born 2000)

Personal information
- Date of birth: 19 April 2000 (age 26)
- Place of birth: Venaria Reale, Italy
- Height: 1.70 m (5 ft 7 in)
- Position: Winger

Team information
- Current team: Benevento
- Number: 11

Youth career
- ASD Venaria Reale
- 2018–2020: Piacenza
- 2019: → ChievoVerona (loan)

Senior career*
Years	Team	Apps	(Gls)
2019–2023	Piacenza	70	(3)
2019–2020	→ Casale (loan)	21	(1)
2023	Alessandria	13	(2)
2023–2024	Rimini	37	(9)
2024–	Benevento	73	(15)
- * Club domestic league appearances and goals as of 1 May 2026

Davide Lamesta (born 19 April 2000) is an Italian professional footballer who plays as a winger and second striker for Serie B club Benevento.

== Club career ==
Lamesta, born in Venaria Reale, started his career as a young in local club ASD Venaria Reale. In 2018, he joined to Piacenza, and was promoted to the first team in 2017.

On 2 September 2019, he was loaned to Serie D club Casale.

He made his debut for Piacenza and Serie C on 27 September 2020 against Grosseto.

On 12 January 2023, Lamesta signed with Alessandria.

On 8 August 2023, Lamesta joined Rimini on a two-year contract.
