= Gabriele Capanni =

Italian footballer (born 2000)

Personal information
- Date of birth: 2 December 2000 (age 25)
- Place of birth: Città di Castello, Italy
- Height: 1.76 m (5 ft 9 in)
- Position: Winger

Team information
- Current team: Recanatese

Youth career
- –2019: AC Milan

Senior career*
Years	Team	Apps	(Gls)
2019–2022	AC Milan	0	(0)
2019–2020	→ Novara (loan)	11	(1)
2020	→ Catania (loan)	8	(0)
2020–2021	→ Cesena (loan)	15	(2)
2021–2022	→ Ternana (loan)	1	(0)
2022–2025	Ternana	17	(1)
2023–2024	→ Rimini (loan)	23	(1)
2024–2025	→ Pianese (loan)	4	(0)
2025	→ Team Altamura (loan)	2	(0)
2025–	Recanatese	0	(0)
- * Club domestic league appearances and goals as of 7 September 2025

Gabriele Capanni (born 2 December 2000) is an Italian professional footballer who plays as a forward for Serie D club Recanatese.

== Club career ==
=== AC Milan ===
He is a product of AC Milan youth teams and started playing for their Under-19 squad in the 2017–18 season. He was included in the senior squad for the first time in the 2019 International Champions Cup, but did not appear in any games.

==== Loan to Novara and Catania ====
On 30 August 2019, he joined Serie C club Novara on loan. He made his professional Serie C debut for Novara on 5 October in a game against Pro Vercelli as a substitute replacing Diego Peralta in the 69th minute. One week later, on 13 October, he scored his first professional goal, as a substitute, in the 62nd minute of a 1–2 loss to Giana Erminio. He made his first start on 20 October against Carrarese, he was replaced after 83 minutes by Angelo Tartaglia and three days later he played his first entire match, a 1–1 away draw against Renate. In January 2020 his loan was interrupted and he finished his first part of the season with 11 appearances, 3 of them as a starter and 1 goal.

On 31 January 2020, Capanni moved on loan to a different Serie C club Catania for the second part of the season. Two days later he made his debut for the club as a substitute replacing Kevin Biondi in the 56th minute of a 2–0 home defeat against Monopoli. On 26 February, Capanni played his first match as a starter, a 1–2 away defeat against Picerno, he was replaced by Nana Welbeck in the 59th minute. Capanni ended his 6-month loan to Catania with 8 appearances, 2 of them in the play-offs and 5 as a starter, without playing any entire match during the loan.

==== Loan to Cesena ====
On 5 October 2020, Capanni was loaned out to Serie C club Cesena on a season-long loan deal. Six days later, on 11 October, Capanni made his debut for the club as a starter in a 4–2 home defeat against FeralpiSalò, he was replaced by Simone Russini in the 46th minute. On 5 December he scored his first goal for Cesena, as a substitute, in the 93rd minute of a 0–1 away win over Legnago Salus. Nine days later, on 13 December, he scored his second goal in the 17th minute of a 0–4 away win over Mantova. Capanni ended his season-long loan to Cesena with 15 appearances, 2 goals and 1 assist, without playing any entire match for the club.

=== Ternana ===
On 27 July 2021, Capanni was loaned out to Serie B side Ternana on a season-long loan deal. He only made one league appearance for the club in the season. On 8 August 2022, he returned to Ternana on a permanent basis and signed a two-year contract. On 1 September 2023, Capanni was loaned by Rimini. On 23 August 2024, he moved on loan to Pianese.

== Career statistics ==
=== Club ===
As of 8 February 2021

Club	Season	League			Cup		Europe		Other		Total	
Club	Season	League	Apps	Goals	Apps	Goals	Apps	Goals	Apps	Goals	Apps	Goals
Novara (loan)	2019–20	Serie C	11	1	0	0	—		—		11	1
Catania (loan)	2019–20	Serie C	6	0	—		—		2 (Note: All appearance(s) in Serie C play-off.)	0	8	0
Cesena (loan)	2020–21	Serie C	15	2	0	0	—		—		15	2
Career total			32	3	0	0	—		2	0	34	3
