= Daniele Iacoponi =

Italian footballer (born 2002)

Personal information
- Date of birth: 25 March 2002 (age 24)
- Place of birth: Rome, Italy
- Height: 1.75 m (5 ft 9 in)
- Position: Winger

Team information
- Current team: Follonica Gavorrano

Youth career
- –2017: Ostia Mare

Senior career*
Years	Team	Apps	(Gls)
2017–2019	Urbetevere		
2019–2020	Vigor Perconti		
2020–2021	Nuova Florida	12	(1)
2021	Arezzo	15	(1)
2021–2025	Parma	4	(0)
2022	→ Pordenone (loan)	4	(0)
2022–2023	→ Foggia (loan)	27	(1)
2023–2024	→ Rimini (loan)	22	(0)
2025–2026	Guidonia	0	(0)
2025–2026	→ Luparense (loan)	12	(1)
2026–	Follonica Gavorrano	0	(0)
- * Club domestic league appearances and goals as of 18 January 2026

Daniele Iacoponi (born 25 March 2002) is an Italian professional footballer who plays as a winger for Serie D club Follonica Gavorrano.

== Club career ==
In July 2020, Iacoponi joined Serie D club Team Nuova Florida from Vigor Perconti. Under head coach Andrea Bussone, he made his senior debut in the fourth tier, scoring one goal in 12 appearances during the first half of the 2020–21 season before moving to Serie C side Arezzo in January 2021. Following Arezzo's relegation, he signed for Parma in the summer of 2021. On 13 January 2022, he joined Pordenone on loan until the end of the season. On 31 August 2022, Iacoponi was loaned by Foggia. On 3 August 2023, he moved on a new loan to Rimini.
