= Alessandro Lombardi =

Italian footballer (born 2000)

Personal information
- Date of birth: 21 January 2000 (age 26)
- Place of birth: Rivoli, Italy
- Height: 1.85 m (6 ft 1 in)
- Position: Midfielder

Team information
- Current team: AlbinoLeffe
- Number: 8

Youth career
- –2018: Juventus
- 2018: → Cagliari (loan)
- 2018–2020: Cagliari

Senior career*
Years	Team	Apps	(Gls)
2020–2022	Imolese	67	(5)
2022–2023	Reggina	4	(1)
2023–2025	Rimini	25	(2)
2024	→ Pontedera (loan)	14	(1)
2025–	AlbinoLeffe	30	(5)
- * Club domestic league appearances and goals as of 30 April 2026

Alessandro Lombardi (born 21 January 2000) is an Italian professional footballer who plays as a midfielder for Serie C Group A club AlbinoLeffe.

== Club career ==
Born in Rivoli, Lombardi started his career in Juventus youth sector. In 2018, he moved to Cagliari Primavera.

On 7 September 2020, he joined Serie C club Imolese. Lombardi made his professional debut on 27 September 2020 against Padova.

On 19 July 2022, he joined Serie B side Reggina.

On 15 January 2024, Lombardi moved to Pontedera on loan with an option to buy.
