= Niccolò Tofanari =

Italian footballer

Personal information
- Date of birth: 12 May 1998 (age 28)
- Place of birth: Florence, Italy
- Height: 1.85 m (6 ft 1 in)
- Position: Defender

Youth career
- San Michele Cattolica Virtus
- –2014: Fiorentina
- 2014–2017: Roma
- 2017: → Torino (loan)

Senior career*
| Years | Team | Apps | (Gls) |
| 2017–2018 | Roma | 0 | (0) |
| 2017–2018 | → Pontedera (loan) | 26 | (0) |
| 2018–2019 | Gubbio | 30 | (0) |
| 2019–2021 | Ascoli | 2 | (0) |
| 2019–2020 | → Fano (loan) | 26 | (0) |
| 2021–2022 | Ancona-Matelica | 29 | (0) |
| 2022–2024 | Rimini | 42 | (0) |
| 2025 | Pistoiese | 3 | (0) |

International career
| 2015 | Italy U-17 | 1 | (0) |
| 2015–2016 | Italy U-18 | 5 | (0) |
| 2016 | Italy U-19 | 3 | (0) |
- * Club domestic league appearances and goals as of 11 May 2025

Niccolò Tofanari (born 12 May 1998) is an Italian footballer who plays as a defender.

== Club career ==
He made his Serie C debut for Pontedera on 27 August 2017 in a game against Alessandria.

On 7 August 2019, he signed with Ascoli and was immediately loaned to Fano.

Upon his return from loan, he made his Serie B debut for Ascoli on 30 December 2020 in a game against Empoli.

On 22 January 2021, he joined Serie C club Ancona-Matelica.

On 6 August 2022, Tofanari joined Rimini on a two-year contract.
