= Edoardo Colombo =

Sammarinese footballer (born 2001)

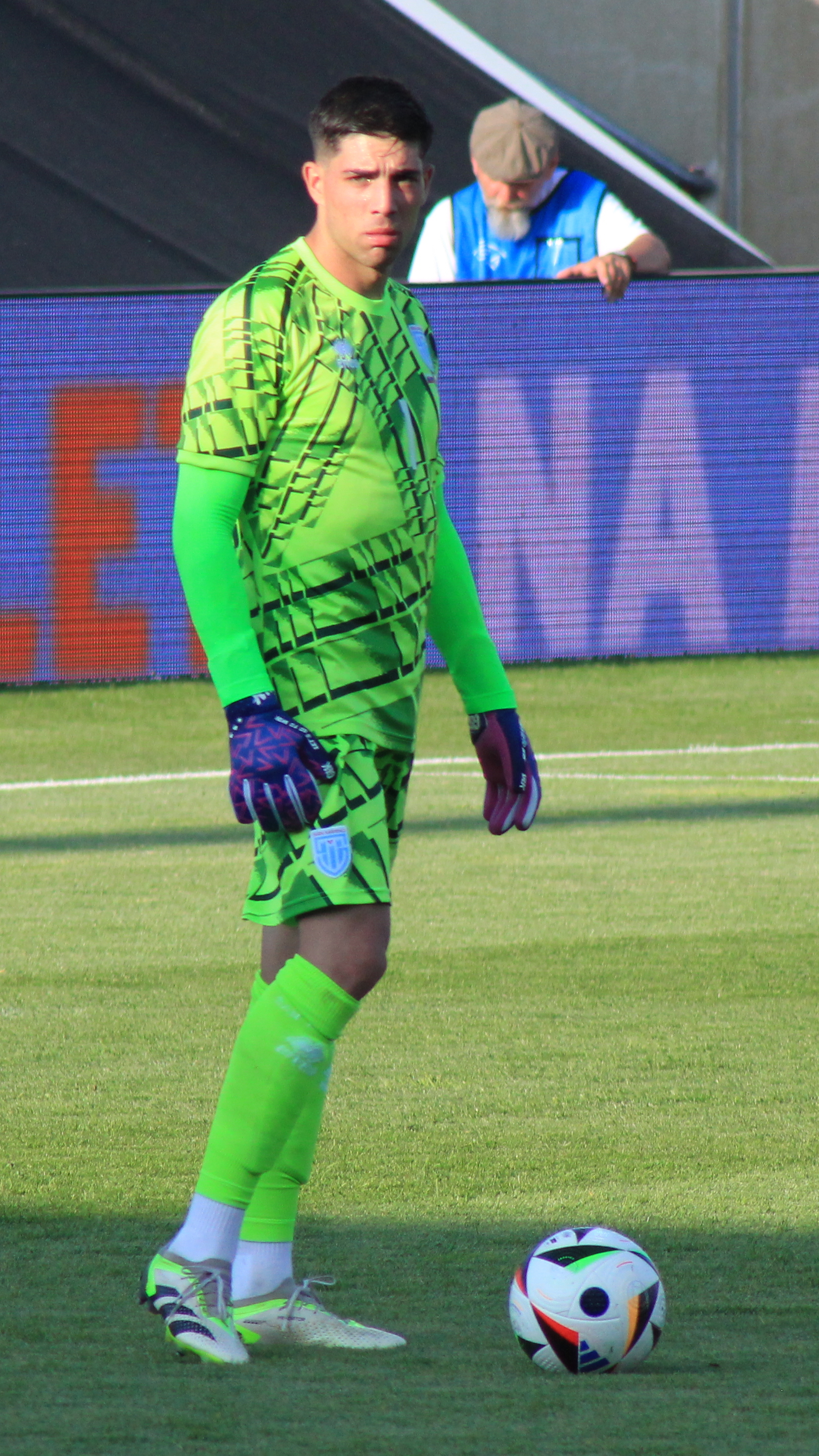
- Colombo with San Marino against Slovakia (2024)

Personal information
- Date of birth: 24 January 2001 (age 25)
- Place of birth: Ravenna, Italy
- Height: 1.85 m (6 ft 1 in)
- Position: Goalkeeper

Team information
- Current team: Gżira United
- Number: 33

Youth career
- Cesena
- 2017–2019: Juventus
- 2018–2019: → Carpi (loan)

Senior career*
Years	Team	Apps	(Gls)
2019–2021	Juventus	0	(0)
2019–2020	→ Torres 1903 (loan)	25	(0)
2020–2021	→ Legnago Salus (loan)	1	(0)
2021	Fermana	1	(0)
2021–2022	Arezzo	34	(0)
2022–2023	Cavese	34	(0)
2023–2024	Rimini	8	(0)
2024–2025	Forlì	2	(0)
2025–	Gżira United	25	(0)

International career^{‡}
2018–2019	San Marino U19	4	(0)
2021	San Marino U21	3	(0)
2024–	San Marino	29	(0)
- * Club domestic league appearances and goals as of 18 May 2026 ‡ National team caps and goals as of 15 November 2026

Edoardo Colombo (born 24 January 2001) is an Italian-born Sanmarinese professional footballer who plays as a goalkeeper for Maltese club Gżira United and the San Marino national team.

== Club career ==
Born in Ravenna, Colombo began his career at the youth academy of Cesena. In 2017, Colombo moved to Serie A side Juventus and joined their youth side. In 2018, Colombo went on loan to Carpi and in 2019 went on loan to Serie D side Torres 1903. During his time with Torres 1903, Colombo played in 25 matches.

On 18 August 2020, Colombo joined Serie C side Legnago Salus on loan. On 26 September 2020, he made his professional debut for the club against Vis Pesaro. He started as the match ended in a 2–2 draw.

On 13 January 2021, he moved to fellow Serie C club Fermana on a permanent basis. Having mainly served as the second-choice keeper behind Samuele Massolo, Colombo played his first and only game for Fermana on 2 May 2021, starting the match against his former club Legnago Salus as it ended in a 3-1 win for the latter team.

On 30 July 2021, Colombo permanently joined Arezzo, which had just got relegated to Serie D. He subsequently played his first match for the Tuscan side on 12 September, starting the match against Foligno in the preliminary round of the Coppa Italia Serie D: just moments before half-time, Colombo blocked a penalty from opponent striker Maurizio Peluso, who then slotted the rebound in the back of the net, scoring what would eventually be the only goal of the game.

On 19 July 2023, Colombo signed a one-year contract with Rimini.

On 21 November 2024, Colombo joined Serie D club Forlì.

== International career ==
Despite being born in Italy, Colombo has represented San Marino internationally.

On 17 November 2018, he made his debut for the national under-19 team against Scotland: he started the match, but couldn't prevent his side from a 5–0 defeat.

In August 2021, Colombo received his first call-up to the San Marino under-21 squad, and he subsequently made his debut on 2 September, starting the home match against Germany as his side eventually lost 6-0.

Colombo received his first senior team cap in a friendly against Saint Kitts and Nevis on 20 March 2024.

== Career statistics ==
=== Club ===
As of match played 4 October 2020

Appearances and goals by club, season and competition
Club	Season	League			Cup		Other		Total	
Club	Season	Division	Apps	Goals	Apps	Goals	Apps	Goals	Apps	Goals
Juventus	2019–20	Serie A	0	0	0	0	0	0	0	0
Juventus	2020–21	Serie A	0	0	0	0	0	0	0	0
Torres 1903 (loan)	2019–20	Serie D	25	0	0	0	—		25	0
Legnago Salus (loan)	2020–21	Serie C	1	0	0	0	—		1	0
Career total			26	0	0	0	0	0	26	0

=== International ===
As of 15 November 2026

San Marino
Year	Apps	Goals
2024	10	0
2025	9	0
2026	10	0
Total	29	0
