= Francesco Semeraro =

Italian footballer

Personal information
- Date of birth: 1 May 2001 (age 25)
- Place of birth: Fasano, Italy
- Height: 1.76 m (5 ft 9 in)
- Position: Left-back

Team information
- Current team: Gelbison
- Number: 3

Youth career
- –2015: Fasano
- 2015–2020: Roma
- 2020: Ascoli
- 2020: → Roma (loan)

Senior career*
Years	Team	Apps	(Gls)
2020–2022	Ascoli	0	(0)
2020–2021	→ Cavese (loan)	22	(0)
2021–2022	→ Grosseto (loan)	33	(0)
2022–2023	Gubbio	17	(2)
2023–2025	Rimini	44	(0)
2025–	Gelbison	0	(0)

International career
2016–2017	Italy U16	9	(0)
2018	Italy U17	1	(0)
2018–2019	Italy U18	5	(0)
2019	Italy U19	1	(0)
- * Club domestic league appearances and goals as of 2 March 2026

Francesco Semeraro (born 1 May 2001) is an Italian footballer who plays as a left back for Gelbison.

== Club career ==
Born in Fasano, Semerano started his career in A.S. Roma youth sector. On 11 March 2019, he was an unused substitute in Serie A match against Empoli.

In 2020 he signed for Ascoli.

On 5 October 2020, he was loaned to Serie C club Cavese. Semeraro made his professional debut on 22 October 2020 against Juve Stabia.

On 27 July 2021, he joined on loan to Grosseto.

On 18 July 2022, Semeraro moved to Gubbio on a permanent basis.

== International career ==
Semeraro was a youth international for Italy.
