= Andrei David =

Romanian professional footballer

Personal information
- Full name: Andrei Alexandru David
- Date of birth: 26 January 2003 (age 23)
- Place of birth: Asiago, Italy
- Height: 1.75 m (5 ft 9 in)
- Position: Attacking midfielder

Team information
- Current team: Lastrigiana

Youth career
- 2013–2022: Fiorentina
- 2022–2023: Piacenza

Senior career*
Years	Team	Apps	(Gls)
2022–2023	Piacenza	0	(0)
2023	→ Aglianese (loan)	4	(0)
2023–2024	UTA Arad	6	(0)
2025	Paradiso	5	(0)
2026–	Lastrigiana	0	(0)

International career
2019	Romania U16	1	(0)
- * Club domestic league appearances and goals as of 9 April 2025

Andrei Alexandru David (born 26 January 2003) is a professional footballer who plays as an attacking midfielder. Born in Italy, he represented Romania as a youth international.

== Early life ==
Andrei David was born in Asiago and played for youth academies of Italian clubs Fiorentina and Piacenza.

== Club career ==
=== UTA Arad ===
Despite it was reported that Liga I clubs like CFR Cluj and Poli Iași were interested in signing him, he chose to sign with UTA Arad. He made his league debut for UTA Arad against FCSB on 22 January 2024.

== Career statistics ==
As of match played 9 April 2025

Appearances and goals by club, season and competition
Club	Season	League			National cup		Europe		Other		Total	
Club	Season	Division	Apps	Goals	Apps	Goals	Apps	Goals	Apps	Goals	Apps	Goals
Aglianese (loan)	2022–23	Serie D	4	0	0	0	—		—		4	0
UTA Arad	2023–24	Liga I	5	0	0	0	—		—		5	0
UTA Arad	2024–25	Liga I	1	0	0	0	—		—		1	0
UTA Arad	Total		6	0	0	0	—		—		6	0
Paradiso	2024–25	Swiss Promotion League	5	0	—		—		—		5	0
Career total			15	0	0	0	—		—		15	0
