= Claudio Morra =

Italian footballer (born 1995)

Personal information
- Date of birth: 22 January 1995 (age 31)
- Place of birth: Savigliano, Italy
- Height: 1.85 m (6 ft 1 in)
- Position: Forward

Team information
- Current team: Vicenza
- Number: 9

Youth career
- –2011: Saluzzo
- 2011–2012: Levante
- 2012–2013: Verona
- 2013–2015: Torino

Senior career*
Years	Team	Apps	(Gls)
2014–2016	Torino	0	(0)
2015–2016	→ Andria (loan)	11	(2)
2016	→ Savona (loan)	9	(1)
2016–2019	Pro Vercelli	95	(22)
2019–2022	Virtus Entella	36	(1)
2021	→ Pordenone (loan)	8	(1)
2022–2023	Piacenza	35	(11)
2023–2024	Rimini	35	(19)
2024–	Vicenza	66	(24)

International career
2015	Italy U20	2	(0)
- * Club domestic league appearances and goals as of 29 April 2026

Claudio Morra (born 22 January 1995) is an Italian professional footballer who plays as a striker for Serie B club Vicenza.

== Club career ==
=== Early career ===
Born in Savigliano, Morra began his career with amateur club Saluzzo, where he remained until he was 16 years old. In 2011, he moved to Spanish club Levante, where he remained for one season, then returned to Italy with Verona, and then Torino in January 2013. He was one of the four overage players of Torino's Primavera in the 2014–15 season, scoring a hat-trick against Fiorentina in the semifinals of the Campionato Nazionale Primavera.

On 4 August Morra was signed by Lega Pro newcomer Andria, and in January 2016, Savona.

=== Pro Vercelli ===
In July 2016, he was sold to Pro Vercelli. Under his former Torino youth coach, Moreno Longo, he made 27 appearances and scored three goals in the 2016–17 season.

=== Virtus Entella ===
On 25 July 2019, he joined Virtus Entella. On 28 January 2021, he moved to Pordenone on loan.

=== Piacenza ===
On 19 August 2022, Morra signed a contract with Piacenza for a term of one year, with an option to extend for two more years.

=== Rimini ===
On 14 August 2023, Morra moved to Rimini on a three-year deal.

=== Vicenza ===
In July 2024, Morra joined Vicenza for 80,000 € on a three-year contract.

== International career ==
On 11 November 2015 he received his first Italy U20 team call-up, replacing Alessandro Piu who joined the U21 team.

== Honours ==
=== Club ===
Torino

- Campionato Primavera: 2014–15
