= Stadio Romeo Neri =

Sports stadium in Rimini, Italy

Coordinates: 44°3′11″N 12°34′38″E

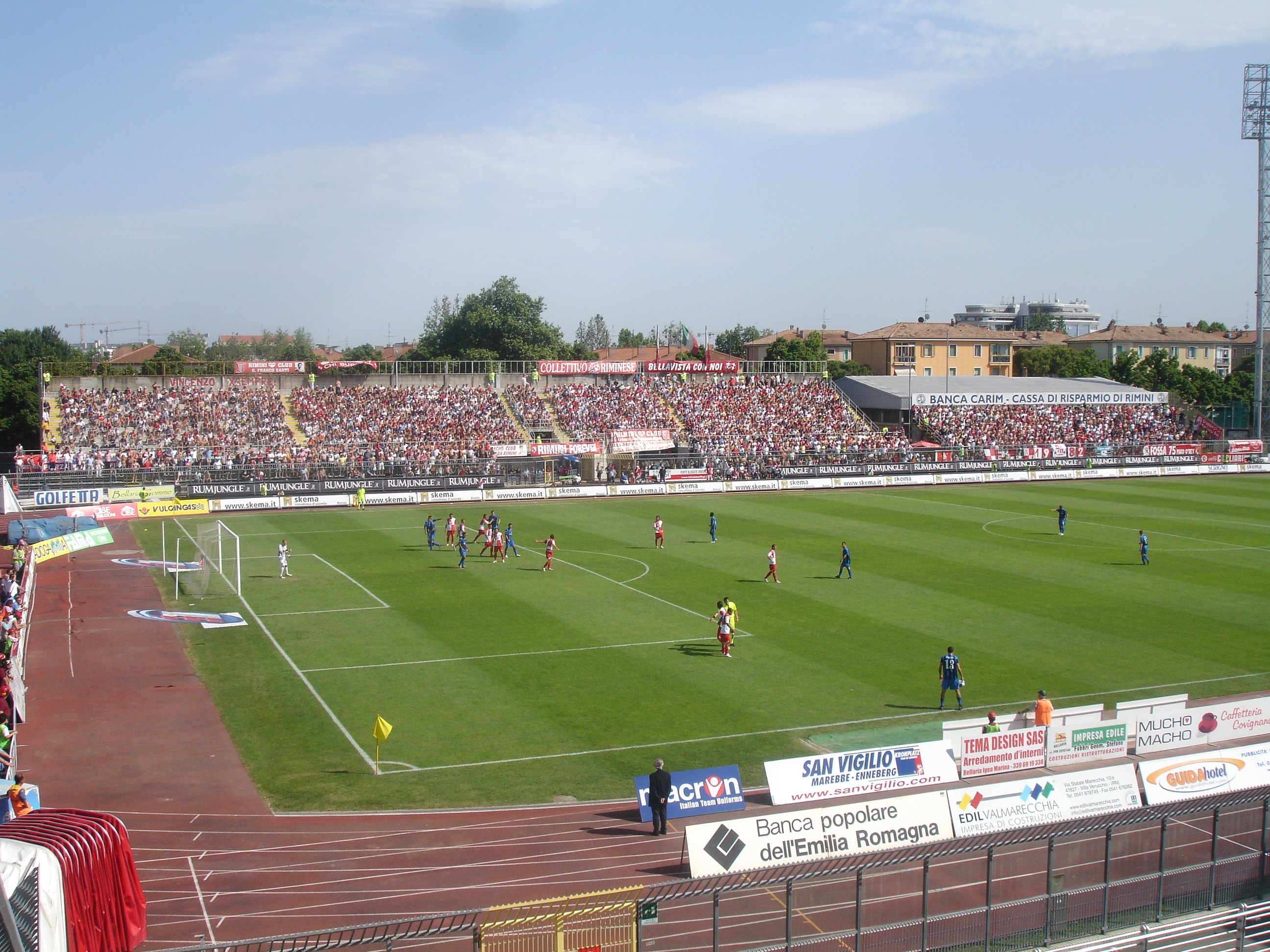
- Interactive map of Stadio Romeo Neri
- Address: Rimini; Italy
- Owner: Comune di Rimini
- Capacity: 9,768 (7,442 approved)
- Surface: Grass; 105x65m

Construction
- Groundbreaking: 1933
- Opened: 1934
- Renovated: 1976; 2005

Tenant
- Rimini FC 1912

Stadio Romeo Neri is a multi-use stadium in Rimini, in the region of Emilia-Romagna, northern Italy.

The stadium has a capacity of 9,768 and is largely used for football as the home of Rimini FC 1912.

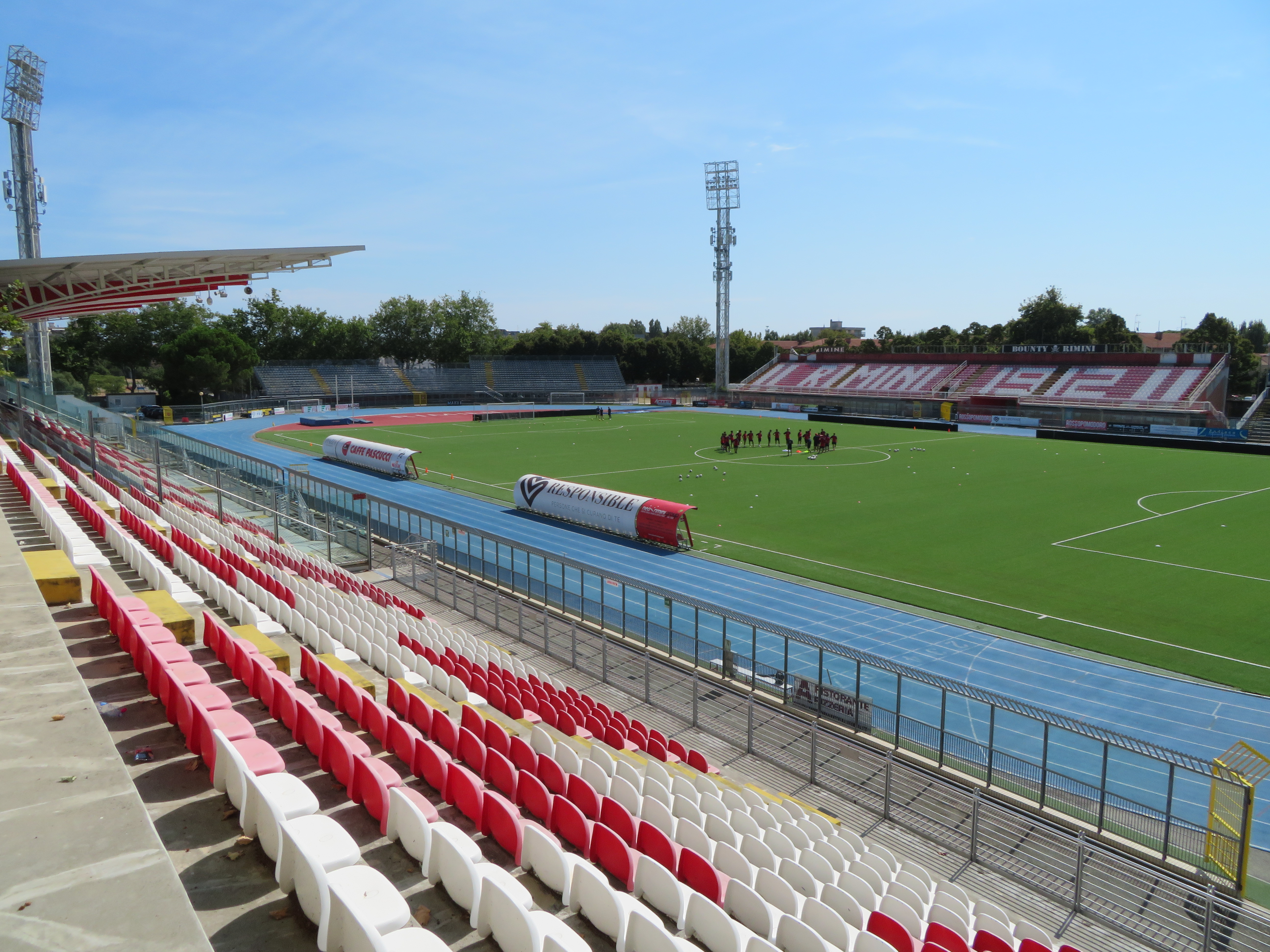
The stadium in July 2024.

== History ==
The decision to construct a new stadium in Rimini was made in 1932. Work began in January 1933, based on a design by engineer Virginio Stramigioli, and was completed approximately one year later. The original facility included a concrete velodrome, three separate stands with a total capacity of 4,000 spectators, three gymnasiums, an athletics track with dedicated platforms, and various support services.

Initially named Stadio del Littorio, the venue hosted the finish line of a Giro d'Italia stage on 2 June 1934. After World War II, it was renamed Stadio Comunale, and later dedicated to Romeo Neri, a gymnast from Rimini who was the city’s first Olympic athlete. Neri won three gold medals at the 1932 Los Angeles Olympic Games and earned four Italian national titles.

Over the decades, the stadium has undergone several renovations and structural changes. In the 1950s, a new grandstand was constructed in the Distinti section. During the 1970s and 1980s, the East Stand (Curva Est) was added; it was later removed and then rebuilt beyond the athletics track in the early 2000s. Major renovations were carried out in 1976 and again in 2005 to comply with Serie B standards of that period.

Between 2010 and 2012, the Romeo Neri stadium was used not only by A.C. Rimini 1912, which inherited the sporting legacy of the former Rimini Calcio, but also by Real Rimini, a club that relocated from Riccione to Rimini that summer with a similar intent, though without success. Both teams competed at the time in Serie D.

In 2014, fans from the Curva Est organized the repainting of the Distinti stands in red and white, displaying the inscription “RIMINI 1912”.

In late 2015, the natural grass surface was replaced with synthetic turf. In 2019, the lighting system was upgraded to meet Serie C standards, with the installation of 96 new floodlights.
