= Stadio Pietro Barbetti =

Multi-purpose stadium in Gubbio, Italy

Coordinates: 43°21′00″N 12°34′00″E

Stadio Comunale Pietro Barbetti
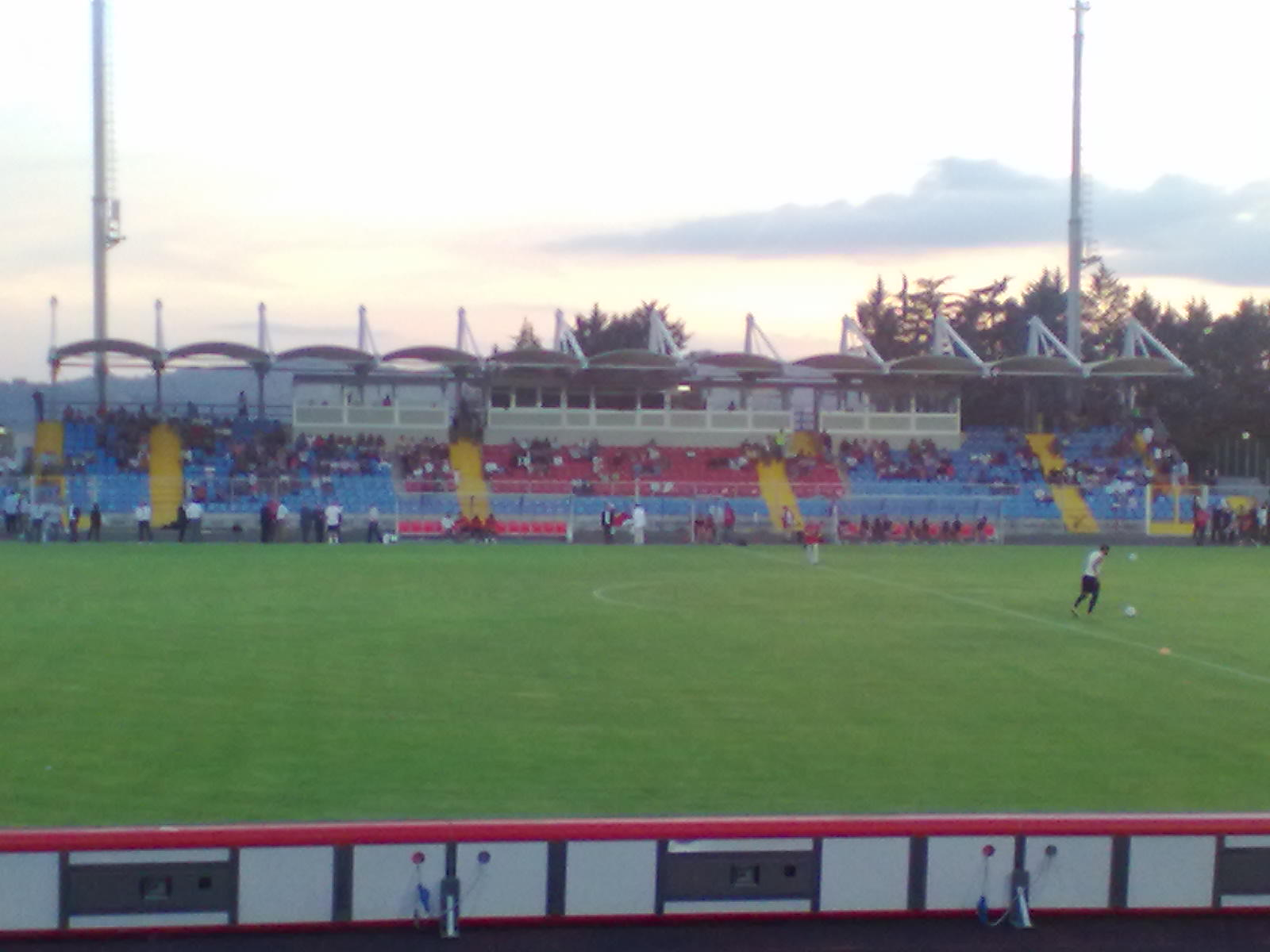
- Interactive map of Stadio Comunale Pietro Barbetti
- Location: Gubbio, Italy
- Owner: Comune of Gubbio
- Capacity: 5,300

Construction
- Groundbreaking: Unknown
- Opened: 1977

Tenant
- A.S. Gubbio 1910

Stadio Comunale Pietro Barbetti, is a multi-purpose stadium in Gubbio, Italy. It is mainly used mostly for football matches and hosts the home matches of A.S. Gubbio 1910 of Serie C. The stadium has a capacity of 5,300 spectators.
