= Rimini Calcio S.S.D. =

Italian football club

Rimini
- Full name: Rimini Football Club
- Nickname: I Biancorossi (The White-Reds)
- Founded: 1912; 114 years ago 1938; 88 years ago (refounded)
- Ground: Stadio Romeo Neri, Rimini
- Capacity: 9,768
- Owner: Alfredo Rota
- Chairman: Alfredo Rota
- Manager: Filippo D'Alesio
- 2024–25: Serie C Group B, 9th of 20
- Website: riminifc.it
Home colours	Away colours

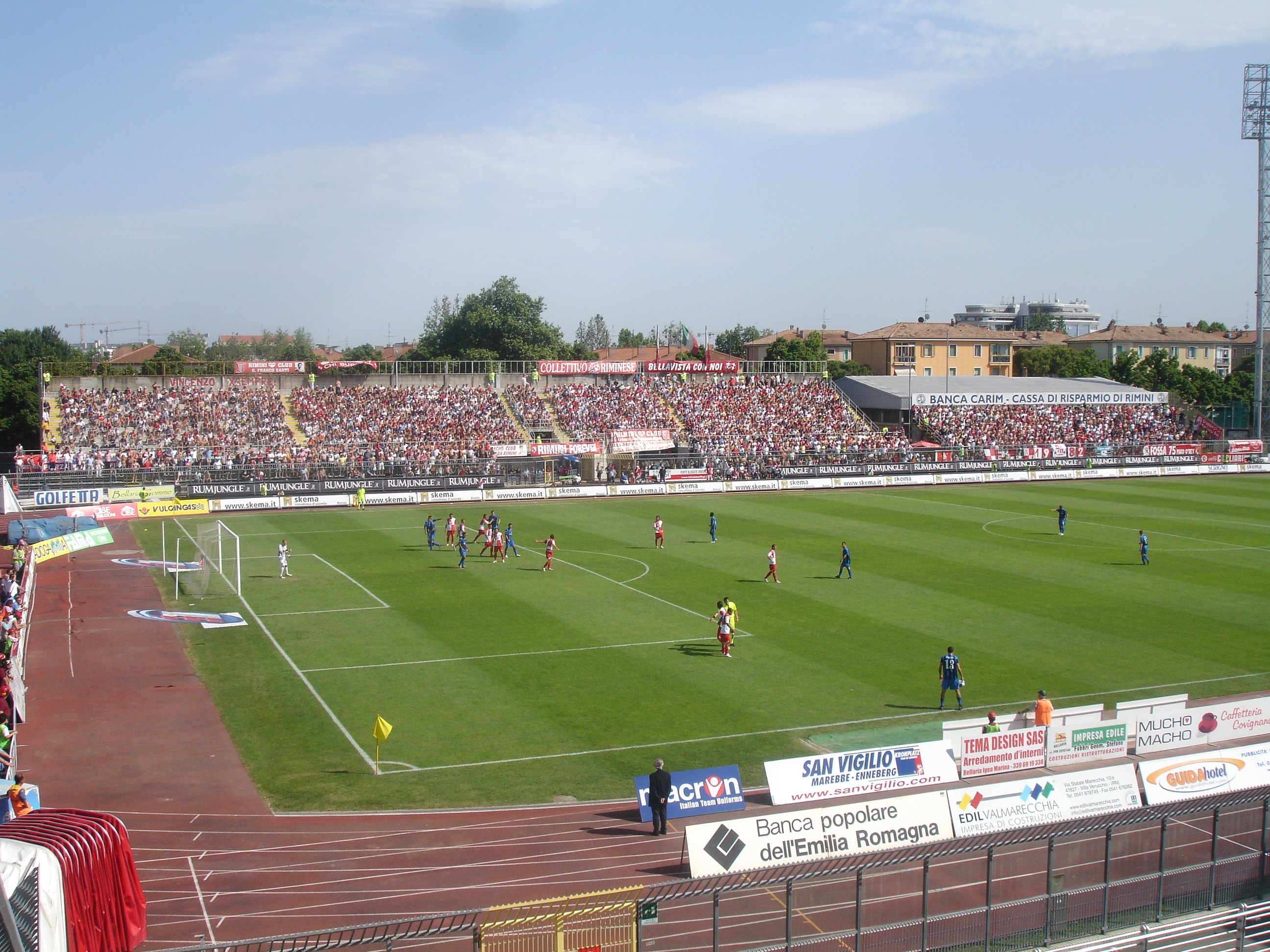
Stadio Romeo Neri in 2009

Rimini Football Club 1912 was an Italian association football club based in Rimini, Emilia-Romagna that last played in the third-tier Serie C.

The original club was founded in 1912. Their former home ground is the 9786-seat Stadio Romeo Neri.

== History ==
The club was firstly founded as Libertas Rimini in 1912 and four years later became independent as Rimini Football Club. Before the introduction of the classic red and white shirts, the club decided to use green and white kits for its first official match against Vis Pesaro.The 1929–30 season saw the building of the stadium still used by the club today; Stadio Romeo Neri. The club name was changed to Rimini Calcio in 1938 after a bankruptcy.

=== Between Serie B and Serie C ===
Rimini competed in regional leagues (the equivalent of the modern day Serie C system) for many years of their existence. They were unable to gain promotion to Serie B until 1976.

During the 1970s the club spent three seasons in Serie B, finishing in the bottom half of the table; they were relegated in 1978–79, but achieved promotion straight back up the following season. Rimini were relegated again during 1981–82, this time however, they did not achieve promotion back up straight away. Rimini spent the next twenty-four seasons in the Serie C league system, dropping as low as C2/C at one point.

However, the 2000s proved to be a brighter time for Rimini; they reached the C2/B playoffs six successive times before gaining promotion to C1/A. In 2004–05, they became Serie C champions (as well as Serie C1 Super Cup winners) and returned to Serie B for the first time since the early 1970s.

=== From Serie B to Lega Pro Prima Divisione ===
On 9 September 2006, Rimini gained the national news after having gained a shocking 1–1 home draw against Juventus FC, with Argentine attacking midfielder Adrián Ricchiuti scoring the equaliser, despite a sending off for Rimini midfielder Domenico Cristiano soon after the 1–0 Juventus lead. They even reached the top of Serie B by early 2007, but at the end of that season they were ranked 5th behind Juventus, Napoli, Genoa and Piacenza.
Two years later, Rimini Calcio has been relegated to Lega Pro Prima Divisione after losing the play-out against the former Ancona.

In the season 2010–11 it would have to play again in the Italian 3rd level championship, but in the spring of 2010 the former ownership left, and nobody took over in the society.

=== A.C. Rimini 1912 ===
In the summer of 2010 the club was refounded as A.C. Rimini 1912, that began life in Serie D, the 5th tier of Italian football. That year, the club won the national play-off finals against Turris on penalties after a 0–0 draw, being promoted to Lega Pro Seconda Divisione (4th tier). At the end of 2011–12 season, Rimini lost the play-off semifinals against Cuneo. The following season was rather complicated for the club, because Rimini had to win two relegation play-off rounds to keep its place in Lega Pro Seconda Divisione. The fall to Serie D came one year after, when 9 of 18 teams were relegated (third and fourth tier were unified into a single league after that edition). In the meanwhile, Fabrizio De Meis assumed the ownership of the club in place of Biagio Amati, who resigned.

Eleven months after the relegation, Rimini came back to Lega Pro after winning the group D of 2014–15 Serie D. In that season, the team collected 86 points, and the striker Manuel Pera scored 30 goals. At the end of 2015–16 Lega Pro, after a season influenced by serious economic problems, A.C. Rimini 1912 could not take part to the following championship due to its debts.

=== Rimini Football Club 1912 ===
In summer 2016, the club was refounded as Rimini Football Club 1912 and competed in Eccellenza Emilia-Romagna for the 2016–17 season and in Serie D for the 2017–18 season, both of them ended with a promotion. On 2 September 2025, Rimini was deducted 16 points due to "various administrative irregularities". The team's struggle continued as their debts and administrative issues accumulated, then, on November 28, the FIGC announced the withdrawal of the team from the Serie C. One day later, the team was disbanded through liquidation.

== Players ==
=== Notable former players ===
Players called up to national team while at Rimini

- (Gabon) Catilina Aubameyang
- (San Marino) Edoardo Colombo
- (San Marino) Alessandro D'Addario
- (San Marino) Alex Della Valle
- (San Marino) Mirko Palazzi
- (San Marino) Mauro Valentini
- (Sierra Leone) Demba Kamara
- (Slovenia) Samir Handanović

== Honours ==
Serie C

- Champions: 1975–76, 2004–05
  - Promoted: 1979–80

Coppa Italia Serie C

- Winners: 2024–25

Super Coppa di Lega Serie C1

- Winners: 2005

Serie C2/B

- Promoted: 2002–03

Serie D

- Champions: 2014–15, 2017–18
  - Promoted: 2010–11

Eccellenza

- Champions: 2016–17
