= 2016–17 US Lecce season =

Lecce
2016–17 season
- President: Enrico Tundo
- Manager: Pasquale Padalino (until 24 April 2017); Roberto Rizzo (from 24 April 2017)
- Stadium: Stadio Via del Mare
- Lega Pro/C: 2nd
- Coppa Italia: Third round
- Coppa Italia Lega Pro: Round of 32
- Top goalscorer: League: Salvatore Caturano (17); All: Salvatore Caturano (18)
- Highest home attendance: 17,254 vs Foggia (31 Oct 2016)
- Lowest home attendance: 3,299 vs AltoVicentino (30 Jul 2016)
- Average home league attendance: 11,457

The 2016–17 season is US Lecce's fifth consecutive season in Lega Pro after their relegation from Serie A at the end of the 2011–12 season. The club competed in Lega Pro Girone C, finishing 2nd, in the Coppa Italia, where the club was knocked out in the third round by Genoa, and in the Coppa Italia Lega Pro, where the club was knocked out by Matera in the round of 32.

== Players ==
=== Squad information ===
As of 31 January 2017

Players in italics left the club during the season Note: Flags indicate national team as defined under FIFA eligibility rules; some limited exceptions apply. Players may hold more than one non-FIFA nationality.

No.	Pos.	Nation	Player
1	GK	ITA	Marco Bleve
12	GK	ITA	Gianmarco Chironi
22	GK	SEN	Lys Gomis
22	GK	ITA	Armando Foscarini
25	GK	ITA	Filippo Perucchini (on loan from Bologna)
2	DF	ITA	Ferdinando Vitofrancesco
3	DF	ITA	Sergio Contessa
3	DF	ITA	Giuseppe Agostinone
5	DF	ITA	Francesco Cosenza
14	DF	ITA	Antonio Giosa (on loan from Como)
15	DF	ITA	Alessandro Camisa
16	DF	ITA	Mirko Drudi
19	DF	FRA	Kevin Vinetot
23	DF	ITA	Simone Ciancio
26	DF	ITA	Gianluca Freddi

No.	Pos.	Nation	Player
4	MF	ITA	Marco Mancosu
6	MF	ITA	Andrea Arrigoni
8	MF	POR	Pedro Costa Ferreira
10	MF	ITA	Franco Lepore (captain)
13	MF	BUL	Radoslav Tsonev
17	MF	ITA	Gianmarco Monaco
20	MF	ITA	Giuseppe Maimone
21	MF	ITA	Luca Fiordilino (on loan from Palermo)
7	FW	ITA	Giuseppe Torromino
9	FW	BUL	Antonio Vutov (on loan from Udinese)
9	FW	ITA	Michele Marconi (on loan from Alessandria)
11	FW	ITA	Mario Pacilli
17	FW	ITA	Andrea Capristo
18	FW	ITA	Salvatore Caturano (on loan from Bari)
24	FW	FRA	Abdou Doumbia
25	FW	ITA	Mattia Persano (on loan from Bologna)

== Transfers ==
=== Summer session ===
In
R.	Name	Moving from	Fee
GK	(Senegal) Lys Gomis	(Italy) Torino	outright purchase
DF	(Italy) Antonio Giosa	(Italy) Como	loan
DF	(Italy) Sergio Contessa	(Italy) Juve Stabia	free transfer
DF	(France) Kévin Vinetot	(Italy) AlbinoLeffe	end of loan
DF	(Italy) Simone Ciancio	(Italy) Cosenza	outright purchase
DF	(Italy) Ferdinando Vitofrancesco	(Italy) Alessandria	outright purchase
DF	(Italy) Mirko Drudi	(Italy) Santarcangelo	outright purchase
MF	(Italy) Andrea Arrigoni	(Italy) Cosenza	outright purchase
MF	(Italy) Luca Fiordilino	(Italy) Palermo	loan
MF	(Italy) Giuseppe Maimone	(Italy) Melfi	outright purchase
MF	(Italy) Marco Mancosu	(Italy) Casertana	outright purchase
MF	(Italy) Gianmarco Monaco	(Italy) Foligno	end of loan
MF	(Bulgaria) Radoslav Tsonev	(Bulgaria) Levski Sofia	free transfer
FW	(Italy) Mario Pacilli	(Italy) Cremonese	outright purchase
FW	(Italy) Salvatore Caturano	(Italy) Bari	loan renewal
FW	(Italy) Giuseppe Torromino	(Italy) Crotone	outright purchase
FW	(Italy) Luigi Della Rocca	(Italy) Rimini	end of loan
FW	(Italy) Antonio Vutov	(Italy) Udinese	loan
FW	(Italy) Mattia Persano	(Italy) Bologna	end of loan

Out
R.	Name	Moving to	Fee
GK	(Italy) Massimiliano Benassi	(Italy) Arezzo	loan
GK	(Italy) Filippo Perucchini	(Italy) Bologna	end of loan
DF	(Italy) Giuseppe Abruzzese	(Italy) Virtus Francavilla	free transfer
DF	(Italy) Raffaele Alcibiade	-	end of contract
DF	(Italy) Andrea Beduschi	(Italy) Vicenza	free transfer
DF	(Italy) Matteo Legittimo	(Italy) Trapani	outright purchase
DF	(Italy) Matteo Liviero	(Italy) Juventus	end of loan
DF	(Italy) Andrea Morello	(Italy) Nardò	loan
DF	(Italy) Francesco Lo Bue	-	end of contract
DF	(Italy) Alessandro Camisa	-	end of contract
MF	(Italy) Fabrizio Lo Sicco	(Italy) AlbinoLeffe	
MF	(Italy) Romeo Papini	(Italy) Matera	free transfer
MF	(Italy) Stefano Salvi	(Italy) Juve Stabia	outright purchase
MF	(Italy) Giuseppe De Feudis	(Italy) Arezzo	end of loan
MF	(Italy) Alessandro Carrozza	-	end of contract
MF	(Panama) Eric Herrera	(Italy) Paganese	loan
FW	(Uruguay) Juan Surraco	(Italy) Ternana	outright purchase
FW	(Hungary) Bálint Vécsei	(Italy) Bologna	end of loan
FW	(Italy) Davis Curiale	(Italy) Trapani	end of loan
FW	(Italy) Davide Moscardelli	(Italy) Arezzo	free transfer
FW	(The Gambia) Ali Sowe	(Italy) Chievo	end of loan
FW	(Italy) Marco Rosafio	(Italy) Juve Stabia	end of loan
FW	(Italy) Luigi Della Rocca	-	end of contract

=== Winter session ===
In
R.	Name	Moving from	Fee
GK	(Italy) Filippo Perucchini	(Italy) Bologna	loan
DF	(Italy) Giuseppe Agostinone	(Italy) Piacenza	outright purchase
MF	(Portugal) Pedro Costa Ferreira	(Italy) Virtus Entella	outright purchase
FW	(Italy) Michele Marconi	(Italy) Alessandria	loan

Out
R.	Name	Moving to	Fee
GK	(Senegal) Lys Gomis	(Italy) Paganese	outright purchase
DF	(Italy) Sergio Contessa	(Italy) Reggiana	loan
DF	(Italy) Gianluca Freddi	-	end of contract
DF	(France) Kevin Vinetot	(Italy) Mantova	loan
FW	(Italy) Andrea Capristo	(Italy) Folgore Caratese	loan
FW	(Italy) Mattia Persano	(Italy) Siracusa	loan
FW	(Italy) Antonio Vutov	(Italy) Udinese	end of loan

== Competitions ==
=== Lega Pro ===
==== League table ====
Pos	Team	Pld	W	D	L	GF	GA	GD	Pts	Promotion, qualification or relegation
1	Foggia (C, P)	38	25	10	3	70	29	+41	85	Promotion to Serie B
2	Lecce	38	21	11	6	62	36	+26	74	Qualification to the promotion play-offs#second round
3	Matera	38	18	11	9	71	44	+27	65	Qualification to the promotion play-offs#second round
4	Juve Stabia	38	18	10	10	65	43	+22	64	Qualification to the promotion play-offs#first round
5	Virtus Francavilla	38	16	9	13	47	45	+2	57	Qualification to the promotion play-offs#first round

Updated to match(es) played on 12 May 2017. Source: Lega Pro
(C) Champions; (P) Promoted

==== Results by round ====
Round	1	2	3	4	5	6	7	8	9	10	11	12	13	14	15	16	17	18	19	20	21	22	23	24	25	26	27	28	29	30	31	32	33	34	35	36	37	38
Ground	A	H	A	H	H	A	H	A	H	A	H	A	H	A	A	H	A	H	A	A	H	A	A	A	H	A	H	A	H	A	H	A	H	H	A	H	A	H
Result	W	W	W	W	D	W	W	D	W	L	D	D	D	W	W	L	W	W	D	D	W	W	W	L	W	W	W	L	W	L	W	D	W	W	D	L	D	D
Position	1	1	1	1	2	2	1	1	1	1	4	4	4	1	1	2	1	1	2	2	2	2	2	3	1	1	1	2	2	2	2	2	2	2	2	2	2	2

Updated to match(es) played on -. Source: Competitive matches
A = Away; H = Home; W = Win; D = Draw; L = Loss

==== Matches ====
28 August 2016 1	Monopoli	1–2	Lecce	Monopoli
16:30 CEST (UTC+02:00)	Mouzakitis 83'	Report	52' Caturano; 68' Torromino	Stadium: Stadio Vito Simone Veneziani; Attendance: 2,813; Referee: Vincenzo Valiante

4 September 2016 2	Lecce	4–1	Akragas	Lecce
20:30 CEST (UTC+02:00)	Torromino 19'; Caturano 32'; Caturano 78'; Torromino 90+3'	Report	7' Zanini	Stadium: Stadio Via del Mare; Attendance: 11,993; Referee: Giosuè Mauro D'Apice

11 September 2016 3	Melfi	1–3	Lecce	Melfi
16:30 CEST (UTC+02:00)	Foggia 84'	Report	29', 31' Caturano; 55' Pacilli	Stadium: Stadio Arturo Valerio; Attendance: 1,000; Referee: Giacomo Camplone

14 September 2016 4	Lecce	3–0	Catanzaro	Lecce
20:30 CEST (UTC+02:00)	Caturano 14'; Torromino 77'; Caturano 80' (pen.)	Report		Stadium: Stadio Via del Mare; Attendance: 11,751; Referee: Francesco Fourneau

18 September 2016 5	Lecce	0–0	Casertana	Lecce
20:30 CEST (UTC+02:00)		Report		Stadium: Stadio Via del Mare; Attendance: 12,460; Referee: Armando Ranaldi

25 September 2016 6	Siracusa	0–2	Lecce	Syracuse
14:30 CEST (UTC+02:00)		Report	68' Mancosu; 85' Pacilli	Stadium: Stadio Nicola De Simone; Attendance: 2,005; Referee: Lorenzo Bertani

2 October 2016 7	Lecce	1–0	Reggina	Lecce
20:30 CEST (UTC+02:00)	Caturano 48'	Report		Stadium: Stadio Via del Mare; Attendance: 11,928; Referee: Federico Dionisi

9 October 2016 8	Vibonese	2–2	Lecce	Vibo Valentia
16:30 CEST (UTC+02:00)	Saraniti 45+2', 74' (pen.)	Report	20' Mancosu; 49' Lepore	Stadium: Stadio Luigi Razza; Attendance: 600; Referee: Andrea Zingarelli

16 October 2016 9	Lecce	3–0	Virtus Francavilla	Lecce
20:30 CEST (UTC+02:00)	Torromino 18', 59', 72'	Report		Stadium: Stadio Via del Mare; Attendance: 12,589; Referee: Luca Massimi

23 October 2016 10	Catania	2–0	Lecce	Catania
14:30 CEST (UTC+02:00)	Tsonev 71' (o.g.); Di Grazia 74'	Report		Stadium: Stadio Angelo Massimino; Attendance: 8,000; Referee: Lorenzo Maggioni

31 October 2016 11	Lecce	0–0	Foggia	Lecce
20:45 CEST (UTC+02:00)		Report		Stadium: Stadio Via del Mare; Attendance: 17,254; Referee: Francesco Guccini

6 November 2016 12	Fondi	2–2	Lecce	Fondi
16:30 CEST (UTC+02:00)	Squillace 45'; Bombagi 47'	Report	1' Torromino; 25' Pacilli	Stadium: Stadio Domenico Purificato; Attendance: 2,000; Referee: Ivan Robilotta

13 November 2016 13	Lecce	1–1	Cosenza	Lecce
20:30 CEST (UTC+02:00)	Mancosu 65'	Report	30' Gambino	Stadium: Stadio Via del Mare; Attendance: 11,434; Referee: Matteo Proietti

20 November 2016 14	Juve Stabia	2–3	Lecce	Castellammare di Stabia
16:30 CEST (UTC+02:00)	Kanouté 5'; Izzillo 37'	Report	59' Pacilli; 69' Tsonev; 90' Caturano	Stadium: Stadio Romeo Menti; Attendance: 4,574; Referee: Antonello Balice

27 November 2016 15	Taranto	0–1	Lecce	Taranto
20:30 CEST (UTC+02:00)		Report	11' Tsonev	Stadium: Stadio Erasmo Iacovone; Attendance: 6,500; Referee: Edoardo Paolini

3 December 2016 16	Lecce	0–3	Matera	Lecce
20:30 CEST (UTC+02:00)		Report	18' Negro; 43' Armellino; 58' Strambelli	Stadium: Stadio Via del Mare; Attendance: 7,731; Referee: Andrea Giuseppe Zanonato

6 December 2016 17	Messina	0–3	Lecce	Messina
14:30 CEST (UTC+02:00)		Report	19' (pen.), 78' Caturano; 45+1' Persano	Stadium: Stadio San Filippo; Attendance: 1,000; Referee: Giosuè Mauro D'Apice

10 December 2016 18	Lecce	3–1	Paganese	Lecce
16:30 CEST (UTC+02:00)	Lepore 36', 57'; Caturano 43'	Report	52' Reginaldo	Stadium: Stadio Via del Mare; Attendance: 11,084; Referee: Antonio Giua

17 December 2016 19	Fidelis Andria	0–0	Lecce	Andria
14:30 CEST (UTC+02:00)		Report		Stadium: Stadio Degli Ulivi; Attendance: 3,326; Referee: Pierantonio Perotti

22 December 2016 20	Lecce	3–3	Monopoli	Lecce
16:30 CEST (UTC+02:00)	Tsonev 30'; Mancosu 47'; Caturano 55'	Report	38', 42' Montini; 78' Gatto	Stadium: Stadio Via del Mare; Attendance: 11,232; Referee: Armando Ranaldi

29 December 2016 21	Akragas	0–2	Lecce	Agrigento
14:30 CEST (UTC+02:00)		Report	58' Caturano; 67' Pacilli	Stadium: Stadio Esseneto; Attendance: 1,000; Referee: Francesco Fourneau

21 January 2017 22	Lecce	3–1	Melfi	Lecce
16:30 CEST (UTC+02:00)	Doumbia 23'; Caturano 29'; Mancosu 90+4'	Report	45' Foggia	Stadium: Stadio Via del Mare; Attendance: 10,645; Referee: Daniele Paterna

30 January 2017 23	Catanzaro	1–2	Lecce	Catanzaro
20:45 CEST (UTC+02:00)	Prestia 28'	Report	68' Doumbia; 75' Lepore	Stadium: Stadio Nicola Ceravolo; Attendance: 1,711; Referee: Giacomo Camplone

4 February 2017 24	Casertana	1–0	Lecce	Caserta
18:30 CEST (UTC+02:00)	Ciotola 24'	Report		Stadium: Stadio Alberto Pinto; Attendance: 1,500; Referee: Luigi Pillitteri

11 February 2017 25	Lecce	2–1	Siracusa	Lecce
14:30 CEST (UTC+02:00)	Caturano 41' (pen.); Malerba 59' (o.g.)	Report	74' De Silvestro	Stadium: Stadio Via del Mare; Attendance: 11,200; Referee: Vincenzo Valiante

18 February 2017 26	Reggina	1–2	Lecce	Reggio di Calabria
16:30 CEST (UTC+02:00)	Coralli 28'	Report	21' Marconi; 47' Doumbia	Stadium: Stadio Oreste Granillo; Attendance: 3,382; Referee: Luca Massimi

25 February 2017 27	Lecce	2–1	Vibonese	Lecce
14:30 CEST (UTC+02:00)	Pacilli 20' (pen.); Marconi 81'	Report	38' Viola	Stadium: Stadio Via del Mare; Attendance: 10,643; Referee: Manuel Volpi

5 March 2017 28	Virtus Francavilla	2–1	Lecce	Francavilla Fontana
14:30 CEST (UTC+02:00)	Prezioso 40'; Abruzzese 70'	Report	43' Lepore	Stadium: Stadio Giovanni Paolo II; Attendance: 2,500; Referee: Fabio Piscopo

12 March 2017 29	Lecce	1–0	Catania	Lecce
14:30 CEST (UTC+02:00)	Costa Ferreira 50'	Report		Stadium: Stadio Via del Mare; Attendance: 11,723; Referee: Edoardo Paolini

19 March 2017 30	Foggia	3–0	Lecce	Foggia
14:30 CEST (UTC+02:00)	Mazzeo 29'; Coletti 33'; Deli 52'	Report		Stadium: Stadio Pino Zaccheria; Attendance: 17,000; Referee: Antonio Giua

26 March 2017 31	Lecce	2–0	Fondi	Lecce
14:30 CEST (UTC+02:00)	Maimone 4'; Torromino 8' (pen.)	Report		Stadium: Stadio Via del Mare; Attendance: 11,022; Referee: Federico Dionisi

2 April 2017 32	Cosenza	0–0	Lecce	Cosenza
18:30 CEST (UTC+02:00)		Report		Stadium: Stadio San Vito-Gigi Marulla; Attendance: 2,061; Referee: Francesco Guccini

5 April 2017 33	Lecce	3–2	Juve Stabia	Lecce
20:45 CEST (UTC+02:00)	Marconi 30'; Tsonev 40'; Caturano 80'	Report	39' Paponi; 90+3' Cutolo	Stadium: Stadio Via del Mare; Attendance: 10,360; Referee: Carlo Amoroso

9 April 2017 34	Lecce	3–0	Taranto	Lecce
14:30 CEST (UTC+02:00)	Torromino 24'; Lepore 26' (pen.); Doumbia 83'	Report		Stadium: Stadio Via del Mare; Attendance: 10,764; Referee: Francesco Fourneau

15 April 2017 35	Matera	1–1	Lecce	Matera
18:30 CEST (UTC+02:00)	Negro 28'	Report	65' Costa Ferreira	Stadium: Stadio XXI Settembre-Franco Salerno; Attendance: 2,000; Referee: Pierantonio Perotti

23 April 2017 36	Lecce	0–1	Messina	Lecce
14:30 CEST (UTC+02:00)		Report	66' Anastasi	Stadium: Stadio Via del Mare; Attendance: 10.368; Referee: Giampaolo Mantelli

30 April 2017 37	Paganese	1–1	Lecce	Pagani
14:30 CEST (UTC+02:00)	Firenze 7'	Report	76' Doumbia	Stadium: Stadio Marcello Torre; Attendance: 1,000; Referee: Fabio Pasciuta

7 May 2017 38	Lecce	1–1	Fidelis Andria	Lecce
17:30 CEST (UTC+02:00)	Mancosu 31'	Report	66' Tartaglia	Stadium: Stadio Via del Mare; Attendance: 10,428; Referee: Giacomo Camplone

=== Play-offs ===
==== Round of 16 ====
21 May 2017 Round of 16 - 1st leg	Sambenedettese	1–1	Lecce	San Benedetto del Tronto
18:30 CEST (UTC+02:00)	Mancuso 46'	Report	52' (pen.) Caturano	Stadium: Stadio Riviera delle Palme; Attendance: 7,932; Referee: Luigi Pillitteri

24 May 2017 Round of 16 - 2nd leg	Lecce	0–0	Sambenedettese	Lecce
20:30 CEST (UTC+02:00)		Report		Stadium: Stadio Via del Mare; Attendance: 10,528; Referee: Andrea Giuseppe Zanonato

==== Quarterfinals ====
31 May 2017 Quarterfinals - 1st leg	Lecce	1–1	Alessandria	Lecce
20:30 CEST (UTC+02:00)	Pacilli 53'	Report	30' Marras	Stadium: Stadio Via del Mare; Attendance: 13,680; Referee: Edoardo Paolini

4 June 2017 Quarterfinals - 2nd leg	Alessandria	0–0 (5–4 p)	Lecce	Alessandria
18 CEST (UTC+02:00)		Report		Stadium: Stadio Giuseppe Moccagatta; Attendance: 5,231; Referee: Francesco Guccini
	Penalties
	Branca (penalty scored) Evacuo (penalty scored); Bocalon (penalty scored); Sosa (penalty scored); Sestu (penalty missed) Nicco (penalty scored)		(penalty missed) Costa Ferreira (penalty scored) Tsonev; (penalty scored) Mancosu; (penalty scored) Caturano; (penalty scored) Lepore (penalty missed) Ciancio

=== Coppa Italia Lega Pro ===
==== Matches ====
19 October 2016 1st round	Virtus Francavilla	1–1 (a.e.t.) (5–6 p)	Lecce	Francavilla Fontana
14:30 CEST (UTC+02:00)	Idda 90'	Report	18' Vutov	Stadium: Stadio Giovanni Paolo II; Attendance: 854; Referee: Vincenzo Valiante
	Penalties
	De Angelis (penalty scored); Abruzzese (penalty scored); Nzola (penalty scored); Galdean (penalty scored); Abate (penalty missed); Gallù (penalty missed)		(penalty missed) Gomis; (penalty scored) Drudi; (penalty scored) Persano; (penalty scored) Tsonev; (penalty scored) Vutov; (penalty scored) Ciancio

9 November 2016 2nd round	Matera	2–1	Lecce	Matera
20:30 CEST (UTC+02:00)	Iannini 22'; Strambelli 90' (pen.)	Report	52' Persano	Stadium: Stadio XXI Settembre-Franco Salerno; Attendance: 1,000; Referee: Vincenzo Fiorini
