= 2017–18 US Lecce season =

Lecce
2017–18 season
- President: Enrico Tundo
- Manager: Roberto Rizzo (until 10 September 2017); Primo Maragliulo (until 17 September 2017); Fabio Liverani (from 17 September 2017)
- Stadium: Stadio Via del Mare
- Lega Pro/C: 1st (promoted)
- Coppa Italia: Third round
- Coppa Italia Serie C: Quarter finals
- Top goalscorer: League: Matteo Di Piazza (10); All: Matteo Di Piazza (14)
- Highest home attendance: 18,264 vs Paganese (29 April 2018)
- Lowest home attendance: 784 vs Bisceglie (21 Nov 2017)

The 2017–18 season is US Lecce's sixth consecutive season in Lega Pro after their relegation from Serie A at the end of the 2011–12 season. The club competed in Serie C Gruppo C, gaining promotion to Serie B, in the Coppa Italia and in the Coppa Italia Serie C.

== Players ==
=== Squad information ===
As of 17 April 2018

Players in italics left the club during the season. Players with a * joined the club during the season.

Note: Flags indicate national team as defined under FIFA eligibility rules; some limited exceptions apply. Players may hold more than one non-FIFA nationality.

| No. | Pos. | Nation | Player |
|---|---|---|---|
| 1 | GK | ITA | Gianmarco Chironi |
| 2 | DF | ITA | Davide Riccardi (on loan from Hellas Verona) |
| 3 | DF | ITA | Luca Di Matteo |
| 4 | MF | ITA | Marco Mancosu |
| 5 | DF | ITA | Francesco Cosenza |
| 6 | MF | ITA | Andrea Arrigoni |
| 7 | FW | ITA | Giuseppe Torromino |
| 8 | MF | POR | Pedro Costa Ferreira |
| 9 | FW | ITA | Matteo Di Piazza (on loan from Foggia) |
| 10 | MF | ITA | Franco Lepore (captain) |
| 11 | FW | ITA | Mario Pacilli |
| 12 | GK | ITA | Paolo Vicino |
| 13 | DF | ITA | Emanuele Valeri |
| 14 | MF | LTU | Linas Mėgelaitis (on loan from Švyturys Marijampolė) |
| 15 | DF | ITA | Antonio Marino |

| No. | Pos. | Nation | Player |
|---|---|---|---|
| 16 | DF | ITA | Mirko Drudi |
| 16 | MF | ITA | Andrea Tabanelli* |
| 17 | MF | ITA | Giacomo Lezzi |
| 18 | FW | ITA | Salvatore Caturano |
| 20 | FW | LTU | Edgaras Dubickas (on loan from Švyturys Marijampolė) |
| 21 | MF | BUL | Radoslav Tsonev |
| 22 | GK | ITA | Filippo Perucchini (on loan from Bologna) |
| 23 | DF | ITA | Simone Ciancio |
| 25 | DF | ITA | Giulio Gambardella |
| 29 | MF | ITA | Marco Armellino |
| 30 | FW | ITA | Mattia Persano |
| 34 | DF | ITA | Matteo Legittimo* |
| 35 | FW | ITA | Andrea Saraniti* |
| 40 | MF | GHA | Ransford Selasi* |

== Competitions ==
=== Serie C ===
==== League table ====
| Pos | Team | Pld | W | D | L | GF | GA | GD | Pts | Promotion, qualification or relegation |
|---|---|---|---|---|---|---|---|---|---|---|
| 1 | Lecce (C, P) | 36 | 21 | 11 | 4 | 53 | 30 | +23 | 74 | Promotion to Serie B |
| 2 | Catania | 36 | 21 | 7 | 8 | 65 | 31 | +34 | 70 | Qualification to the promotion play-offs |
| 3 | Trapani | 36 | 19 | 11 | 6 | 60 | 35 | +25 | 68 | Qualification to the promotion play-offs |
| 4 | Juve Stabia | 36 | 14 | 13 | 9 | 49 | 35 | +14 | 55 | Qualification to the promotion play-offs |
| 5 | Cosenza (O, P) | 36 | 14 | 12 | 10 | 41 | 35 | +6 | 54 | Qualification to the promotion play-offs |
| 6 | Monopoli | 36 | 14 | 11 | 11 | 46 | 35 | +11 | 53 | Qualification to the promotion play-offs |
| 7 | Casertana | 36 | 13 | 11 | 12 | 37 | 32 | +5 | 50 (Note: Casertana is ahead of Rende on head-to-head points: Casertana 0–0 Rende, Rende 0–1 Casertana.) | Qualification to the promotion play-offs |
| 8 | Rende | 36 | 14 | 8 | 14 | 31 | 35 | −4 | 50 | Qualification to the promotion play-offs |
| 9 | Virtus Francavilla | 36 | 10 | 16 | 10 | 35 | 43 | −8 | 46 (Note: Virtus Francavilla is ahead of Sicula Leonzio on head-to-head points: Virtus Francavilla 2–1 Sicula Leonzio, Sicula Leonzio 2–2 Virtus Francavilla.) | Qualification to the promotion play-offs |
| 10 | Sicula Leonzio | 36 | 11 | 13 | 12 | 37 | 37 | 0 | 46 | Qualification to the promotion play-offs |
| 11 | Bisceglie | 36 | 11 | 12 | 13 | 39 | 46 | −7 | 45 | |
| 12 | Matera (Note: Matera was deducted 13 points for irregularities.) | 36 | 15 | 10 | 11 | 40 | 37 | +3 | 42 (Note: Head-to-head points: Matera 12 pts, Siracusa 3 pts, Catanzaro 3 pts. Siracusa is ahead of Catanzaro on overall goal difference.) | |
| 13 | Siracusa (Note: Siracusa Calcio was deducted 10 points for irregularities.) | 36 | 14 | 10 | 12 | 37 | 29 | +8 | 42 | |
| 14 | Catanzaro | 36 | 11 | 9 | 16 | 35 | 45 | −10 | 42 | |
| 15 | Reggina | 36 | 9 | 14 | 13 | 29 | 38 | −9 | 41 | |
| 16 | Fidelis Andria (Note: Fidelis Andria was deducted 3 points for irregularities. Fidelis Andria was denied registration for the 2018–19 Serie C, based on Covisoc's assessment of the club's debt situation.) | 36 | 8 | 17 | 11 | 36 | 40 | −4 | 38 | Club dissolved |
| 17 | Paganese (O) | 36 | 7 | 12 | 17 | 36 | 56 | −20 | 33 | Qualification to the relegation play-outs |
| 18 | Fondi (R) | 36 | 7 | 9 | 20 | 33 | 52 | −19 | 30 | Qualification to the relegation play-outs |
| 19 | Akragas (Note: Akragas was deducted 15 points for irregularities.) (R) | 36 | 3 | 6 | 27 | 18 | 66 | −48 | 0 | Relegation to Serie D |

Source: Soccerway, lega-pro.com
(C) Champions; (O) Play-off winners; (P) Promoted; (R) Relegated

==== Matches ====
| 26 August 2017 1 | Virtus Francavilla | 1–1 | Lecce | Brindisi |
| | | | | Stadium: Stadio Franco Fanuzzi |

| 2 September 2017 2 | Lecce | 2–1 | Trapani | Lecce |
| | | | | Stadium: Stadio Via del Mare |

| 9 September 2017 3 | Catania | 3–0 | Lecce | Catania |
| | | | | Stadium: Stadio Angelo Massimino |

| 16 September 2017 4 | Lecce | 1–0 | Rende | Lecce |
| | | | | Stadium: Stadio Via del Mare |

| 23 September 2017 5 | Catanzaro | 1–3 | Lecce | Catanzaro |
| | | | | Stadium: Stadio Nicola Ceravolo |

| 30 September 2017 6 | Lecce | 3–1 | Bisceglie | Lecce |
| | | | | Stadium: Stadio Via del Mare |

| 3 October 2017 7 | Lecce | 3–2 | Sicula Leonzio | Lecce |
| | | | | Stadium: Stadio Via del Mare |

| 7 October 2017 8 | Juve Stabia | 2–3 | Lecce | Castellamare di Stabia |
| | | | | Stadium: Stadio Alberto Pinto |

| 14 October 2017 9 | Lecce | 0–0 | Akragas | Lecce |
| | | | | Stadium: Stadio Via del Mare |

| 21 October 2017 10 | Matera | 0–1 | Lecce | Matera |
| | | | | Stadium: Stadio XXI Settembre-Franco Salerno |

| 30 October 2017 11 | Lecce | 1–0 | Cosenza | Lecce |
| | | | | Stadium: Stadio Via del Mare |

| 4 November 2017 12 | Fidelis Andria | 1–1 | Lecce | Andria |
| | | | | Stadium: Stadio degli Ulivi |

| 7 November 2017 13 | Lecce | 2–1 | Casertana | Lecce |
| | | | | Stadium: Stadio Via del Mare |

| 11 November 2017 14 | Siracusa | 1–3 | Lecce | Siracusa |
| | | | | Stadium: Stadio Nicola De Simone |

| 18 November 2017 15 | Lecce | 2–1 | Reggina | Lecce |
| | | | | Stadium: Stadio Via del Mare |

| 25 November 2017 16 | Racing Fondi | 0–0 | Lecce | Fondi |
| | | | | Stadium: Stadio Domenico Purificato |

| 3 December 2017 17 | - | rest | - |
| | | - | Stadium: - |

| 10 December 2017 18 | Paganese | 1–1 | Lecce | Pagani |
| | | | | Stadium: Stadio Marcello Torre |

| 25 November 2017 19 | Lecce | 2–0 | Monopoli | Lecce |
| | | | | Stadium: Stadio Via del Mare |

| 23 December 2017 20 | Lecce | 4–0 | Virtus Francavilla | Lecce |
| | | | | Stadium: Stadio Via del Mare |

| 29 December 2017 21 | Trapani | 1–1 | Lecce | Trapani |
| | | | | Stadium: Stadio Polisportivo Provinciale |

| 21 January 2018 22 | Lecce | 1–1 | Catania | Lecce |
| | | | | Stadium: Stadio Via del Mare |

| 28 January 2018 23 | Rende | 0–1 | Lecce | Rende |
| | | | | Stadium: Stadio Marco Lorenzon |

| 4 February 2018 24 | Lecce | 3–1 | Catanzaro | Lecce |
| | | | | Stadium: Stadio Via del Mare |

| 9 February 2018 25 | Bisceglie | 1–2 | Lecce | Bisceglie |
| | | | | Stadium: Stadio Gustavo Ventura |

| 18 February 2018 26 | Sicula Leonzio | 0–0 | Lecce | Catania |
| | | | | Stadium: Stadio Angelo Massimino |

| 25 February 2018 27 | Lecce | 0–1 | Juve Stabia | Lecce |
| | | | | Stadium: Stadio Via del Mare |

| 3 March 2018 28 | Akragas | 0–2 | Lecce | Siracusa |
| | | | | Stadium: Stadio Nicola de Simone |

| 11 March 2018 29 | Lecce | 0–0 | Matera | Lecce |
| | | | | Stadium: Stadio Via del Mare |

| 19 March 2018 30 | Cosenza | 0–1 | Lecce | Cosenza |
| | | | | Stadium: Stadio San Vito-Gigi Marulla |

| 22 March 2018 31 | Lecce | 2–2 | Fidelis Andria | Lecce |
| | | | | Stadium: Stadio Via del Mare |

| 26 March 2018 32 | Casertana | 1–0 | Lecce | Caserta |
| | | | | Stadium: Stadio Romeo Menti |

| 31 March 2018 33 | Lecce | 1–1 | Siracusa | Lecce |
| | | | | Stadium: Stadio Via del Mare |

| 8 April 2018 34 | Reggina | 0–1 | Lecce | Reggio Calabria |
| | | | | Stadium: Stadio Oreste Granillo |

| 15 April 2018 35 | Lecce | 2–0 | Racing Fondi | Lecce |
| | | | | Stadium: Stadio Via del Mare |

| 22 April 2018 36 | - | rest | - |
| | | - | Stadium: - |

| 29 April 2018 37 | Lecce | 1–0 | Paganese | Lecce |
| | | | | Stadium: Stadio Via del Mare |

| 6 May 2018 38 | Monopoli | 4–1 | Lecce | Monopoli |
| | | | | Stadium: Stadio Marcello Veneziani |

=== Coppa Italia Serie C ===
==== Matches ====
| 21 November 2017 2nd round | Lecce | 2–1 | Bisceglie | Lecce |
| | | | | Stadium: Stadio Via del Mare |

| 14 January 2018 Round of 16 | Lecce | 3–0 | Matera | Lecce |
| | | | | Stadium: Stadio Via del Mare |

| 14 February 2018 Round of 8 | Lecce | 0–2 | Cosenza | Lecce |
| | | | | Stadium: Stadio Via del Mare |

=== Supercoppa Serie C ===
==== Matches ====
| 12 May 2018 Matchday 1 | - | rest | - |

| 19 May 2018 Matchday 2 | Livorno | 3–1 | Lecce | Livorno |
| | | | | Stadium: Stadio Armando Picchi |

| 26 May 2018 Matchday 3 | Lecce | 0–1 | Padova | Lecce |
| | | | | Stadium: Stadio Via del Mare |
