= 2018–19 US Lecce season =

Lecce
2018–19 season
- President: Saverio Sticchi Damiani
- Manager: Fabio Liverani
- Stadium: Stadio Via del Mare
- Serie B: 2nd (promoted)
- Coppa Italia: Third round
- Top goalscorer: League: Andrea La Mantia (17); All: Andrea La Mantia (17)
- Highest home attendance: 25,135 vs Spezia (11 May 19)
- Lowest home attendance: 5,438 vs Feralpisalò (7 Aug 18)

The 2018–19 season is U.S. Lecce's first season in Serie B since 2010 after their relegation from Serie A to Lega Pro at the end of the 2011–12 season. The club competes in Serie B and the Coppa Italia.

== Players ==
As of 20 February 2019.

Players in italics left the club during the season.
Players with a * joined the club during the season.

Note: Flags indicate national team as defined under FIFA eligibility rules; some limited exceptions apply. Players may hold more than one non-FIFA nationality.

No.	Pos.	Nation	Player
1	GK	ITA	Marco Bleve
2	DF	ITA	Davide Riccardi
3	DF	ITA	Luca Di Matteo
4	MF	ITA	Jacopo Petriccione
5	DF	ITA	Francesco Cosenza
6	MF	ITA	Andrea Arrigoni
7	MF	ITA	Cosimo Chiricò
7	MF	GRE	Panagiotis Tachtsidis* (on loan from Nottingham Forest)
8	MF	ITA	Marco Mancosu (captain)
9	FW	ITA	Marco Tumminello* (on loan from Atalanta)
10	MF	ITA	Franco Lepore
11	FW	ITA	Giuseppe Torromino
13	MF	NED	Thom Haye
14	MF	ITA	Simone Palombi (on loan from Lazio)
15	DF	ITA	Antonio Marino
16	DF	ITA	Biagio Meccariello (on loan from Brescia)
17	FW	ITA	Stefano Pettinari

No.	Pos.	Nation	Player
18	FW	LTU	Edgaras Dubickas
18	FW	ITA	Andrea Saraniti**
19	FW	ITA	Andrea La Mantia
20	MF	ITA	Filippo Falco
21	MF	BUL	Radoslav Tsonev
21	FW	ITA	Mattia Felici***
22	GK	ITA	Mauro Vigorito
23	MF	ITA	Andrea Tabanelli
24	DF	ITA	Lorenzo Venuti (on loan from Fiorentina)
25	DF	ITA	Fabio Lucioni
27	DF	ITA	Marco Calderoni
28	DF	ITA	Riccardo Fiamozzi
29	MF	ITA	Marco Armellino
30	MF	ITA	Manuel Scavone (on loan from Parma)
31	DF	ITA	Cesare Bovo
32	GK	CAN	Joakim Milli
34	MF	SVN	Žan Majer

** Left the club (shirt no. 9) on loan in August 2019, but came back from loan in January 2019.
*** from the Primavera team.

=== Out on loan ===
Note: Flags indicate national team as defined under FIFA eligibility rules; some limited exceptions apply. Players may hold more than one non-FIFA nationality.

No.	Pos.	Nation	Player
—	GK	ITA	Gianmarco Chironi (at Virtus Verona)
—	GK	ITA	Andrea Morelli (at Sanremese)
—	DF	CRO	Luka Dumančić (at Juve Stabia)
—	MF	POR	Pedro Costa Ferreira (at Trapani)
—	MF	ITA	Giuseppe Maimone (at Monopoli)
—	MF	LTU	Linas Mėgelaitis (at Sicula Leonzio)
—	MF	BUL	Radoslav Tsonev (at Viterbese Castrense)

No.	Pos.	Nation	Player
—	FW	ITA	Salvatore Caturano (at Virtus Entella)
—	FW	ITA	Davide Cavaliere (at Virtus Francavilla)
—	FW	LTU	Edgaras Dubickas (at Sicula Leonzio)
—	MF	LTU	Linas Mėgelaitis (at Sicula Leonzio)
—	FW	ITA	Mattia Persano (at Arezzo)
—	FW	ITA	Stefano Pettinari (at Crotone)

== Competitions ==
=== Serie B ===
==== Results by round ====
Round	1	2	3	4	5	6	7	8	9	10	11	12	13	14	15	16	17	18	19	20	21	22	23	24	25	26	27	28	29	30	31	32	33	34	35	36	37	38
Ground	A	H	A	H	A	H	A	H	A	H	A	A	H	A	H	A	H	-	A	H	A	H	A	H	A	H	A	H	A	H	H	A	H	A	H	A	-	H
Result	D	D	L	W	W	D	W	L	D	W	L	W	W	W	D	L	W	-	D	D	W	W	D	W	L	W	L	W	D	W	W	L	W	W	W	L	-	W
Position	3	8	13	9	5	7	3	6	8	6	7	5	3	2	3	3	2	4	5	4	4	3	4	4	6	4	4	4	4	2	2	2	2	2	2	2	2	2

Updated to match(es) played on 1 May 2019. Source: Competitive matches
A = Away; H = Home; W = Win; D = Draw; L = Loss

==== Matches ====
27 August 2018 1	Benevento	3–3	Lecce	Benevento
21:00 CEST (UTC+02:00)	Volta 69'; Ricci 81'; Coda 87' (pen.)	Report	30' Mancosu; 57' Falco; 60' Fiamozzi	Stadium: Stadio Ciro Vigorito; Attendance: 11,307; Referee: Sacchi

2 September 2018 2	Lecce	2–2	Salernitana	Lecce
21:00 CEST (UTC+02:00)	Mancosu 5'; Falco 81'	Report	71' Bocalon; 90+1' Castiglia	Stadium: Stadio Via del Mare; Attendance: 12,675; Referee: Di Martino

16 September 2018 3	Ascoli	1–0	Lecce	Ascoli Piceno
18:00 CEST (UTC+02:00)	Ardemagni 69'	Report		Stadium: Stadio Cino e Lillo Del Duca; Attendance: 6,403; Referee: Rapuano

22 September 2018 4	Lecce	2–1	Venezia	Lecce
15:00 CEST (UTC+02:00)	Palombi 73' 90+2'	Report	60' Di Mariano	Stadium: Stadio Via del Mare; Attendance: 9,326; Referee: Baroni

25 September 2018 5	Livorno	0–3	Lecce	Livorno
21:00 CEST (UTC+02:00)		Report	15' La Mantia; 48' 59' Palombi	Stadium: Stadio Armando Picchi; Referee: Guccini

29 September 2018 6	Lecce	1–1	Cittadella	Lecce
15:00 CEST (UTC+02:00)	Mancosu 13' (pen.)	Report	81' Strizzolo	Stadium: Stadio Via del Mare; Attendance: 9,278; Referee: Giua

5 October 2018 7	Verona	0–2	Lecce	Verona
21:00 CEST (UTC+02:00)		Report	45+1' La Mantia; 68' Mancosu	Stadium: Stadio Marc'Antonio Bentegodi; Attendance: 16,142; Referee: Massimi

21 October 2018 8	Lecce	1–2	Palermo	Lecce
21:00 CEST (UTC+02:00)	Tabanelli 37'	Report	29' Nestorovski; 85' Pușcaș	Stadium: Stadio Via del Mare; Attendance: 12,719; Referee: Volpi

27 October 2018 9	Foggia	2–2	Lecce	Foggia
15:00 CEST (UTC+02:00)	Deli 45'; Tonucci 52'	Report	55' Mancosu; 74' La Mantia	Stadium: Stadio Pino Zaccheria; Attendance: 12,537; Referee: Aureliano

31 October 2018 10	Lecce	1–0	Crotone	Lecce
21:00 CEST (UTC+02:00)	Venuti 36'	Report		Stadium: Stadio Via del Mare; Attendance: 8,952; Referee: Fourneau

5 November 2018 11	Pescara	4–2	Lecce	Pescara
21:00 CEST (UTC+02:00)	Leonardo Mancuso 3'; Gravillon 22'; Del Sole 89' 90+6'	Report	45+2' Palombi; (red card) 52' Calderoni; 67' Tabanelli; (red card) 76' Meccariello	Stadium: Stadio Adriatico – Giovanni Cornacchia; Attendance: 8,782; Referee: Di Paolo

10 November 2018 12	Cosenza	2–3	Lecce	Cosenza
18:00 CEST (UTC+02:00)	Tutino 67' 80'	Report	8' Venuti; 13' Palombi; 82' Falco	Stadium: Stadio San Vito-Gigi Marulla; Attendance: 6,881; Referee: Sacchi

25 November 2018 13	Lecce	2–0	Cremonese	Lecce
21:00 CEST (UTC+02:00)	Falco 64'; La Mantia 78'	Report		Stadium: Stadio Via del Mare; Attendance: 8,198; Referee: Serra

2 December 2018 14	Carpi	0–1	Lecce	Carpi
15:00 CEST (UTC+02:00)		Report	36' La Mantia	Stadium: Stadio Sandro Cabassi; Attendance: 3,812; Referee: Guccini

8 December 2018 15	Lecce	0–0	Perugia	Lecce
15:00 CEST (UTC+02:00)		Report		Stadium: Stadio Via del Mare; Attendance: 10,300; Referee: Marinelli

16 December 2018 16	Brescia	2–1	Lecce	Brescia
21:00 CEST (UTC+02:00)	Donnarumma 49'; Gastaldello 90+2'	Report	25' La Mantia	Stadium: Stadio Mario Rigamonti; Attendance: 6,500; Referee: Fourneau

23 December 2018 17	Lecce	3–2	Padova	Lecce
15:00 CEST (UTC+02:00)	Scavone 9'; Armellino 28'; Lucioni 71'	Report	68' (pen.) 90+2' (pen.) Bonazzoli	Stadium: Stadio Via del Mare; Attendance: 12,112; Referee: Volpi

27 December 2018 18	rest

30 December 2018 19	Spezia	1–1	Lecce	La Spezia
21:00 CEST (UTC+02:00)	Ricci 13' (pen.)	Report	68' Scavone	Stadium: Stadio Alberto Picco; Attendance: 5,977; Referee: Ghersini

19 January 2019 20	Lecce	1–1	Benevento	Lecce
15:00 CEST (UTC+02:00)	62' Mancosu	Report	Coda 71'	Stadium: Stadio Via del Mare; Attendance: 10,118; Referee: Serra

26 January 2018 21	Salernitana	1–2	Lecce	Salerno
18:00 CEST (UTC+02:00)	Minala 72'	Report	4' Mancosu; 20' Palombi	Stadium: Stadio Arechi; Attendance: 7,713; Referee: Maggioni

23 March 2019 22	Lecce	7–0	Ascoli	Lecce
18:00 CEST (UTC+02:00)	Tabanelli 3' 60'; Petriccione 15'; La Mantia 18'; Mancosu 23' 66'; Falco 30' (pen.)	Report		Stadium: Stadio Via del Mare; Attendance: 12,583; Referee: Baroni

11 February 2018 23	Venezia	1–1	Lecce	Venice
21:00 CEST (UTC+02:00)	Citro 50'	Report	51' Palombi	Stadium: Stadio Pier Luigi Penzo; Attendance: 2,919; Referee: Giua

17 February 2019 24	Lecce	3–2	Livorno	Lecce
15:00 CEST (UTC+02:00)	La Mantia 61' 90+2'; Arrigoni 79'	Report	Bogdan 31'; Diamanti 37'	Stadium: Stadio Via del Mare; Attendance: 9,544; Referee: Massimi

23 February 2019 25	Cittadella	4–1	Lecce	Cittadella
15:00 CEST (UTC+02:00)	Moncini 18' 42' 58'; Adorni 70'	Report	12' La Mantia	Stadium: Stadio Piercesare Tombolato; Attendance: 5,543

26 February 2019 26	Lecce	2–1	Verona	Lecce
21:00 CEST (UTC+02:00)	La Mantia 34'; Lucioni 52'	Report	90+4' Laribi	Stadium: Stadio Via del Mare; Attendance: 9,518; Referee: Sacchi

2 March 2019 27	Palermo	2–1	Lecce	Palermo
18:00 CEST (UTC+02:00)	Trajkovski 4'; Pușcaș 52'	Report	90+3' Tabanelli	Stadium: Stadio Renzo Barbera; Attendance: 9,899; Referee: Aureliano

9 March 2019 28	Lecce	1–0	Foggia	Lecce
15:00 CEST (UTC+02:00)	La Mantia 59'	Report		Stadium: Stadio Via del Mare; Attendance: 11,680; Referee: Nasca

17 March 2019 29	Crotone	2–2	Lecce	Crotone
21:00 CEST (UTC+02:00)	Simy 5'; Benali 79'	Report	9' Tabanelli; 25' Mancosu	Stadium: Stadio Ezio Scida; Referee: Piccinini

31 March 2019 30	Lecce	2–0	Pescara	Lecce
21:00 CEST (UTC+02:00)	La Mantia 13'; Mancosu 37'	Report		Stadium: Stadio Via del Mare; Attendance: 12,936; Referee: Ros

3 April 2019 31	Lecce	3–1	Cosenza	Lecce
19:00 CEST (UTC+02:00)	Tabanelli 5'; La Mantia 60' 64'	Report	2' Garritano	Stadium: Stadio Via del Mare; Attendance: 11,785; Referee: Guccini

7 April 2019 32	Cremonese	2–0	Lecce	Cremona
15:00 CEST (UTC+02:00)	Strizzolo 67' 79'	Report		Stadium: Stadio Giovanni Zini; Attendance: 10,199; Referee: Di Martino

13 April 2019 33	Lecce	4–1	Carpi	Lecce
15:00 CEST (UTC+02:00)	Venuti 56'; Mancosu 62'; Falco 64'; Tumminello 73'	Report	80' Suagher	Stadium: Stadio Via del Mare; Attendance: 9,360; Referee: Piscopo

22 April 2019 34	Perugia	1–2	Lecce	Perugia
21:00 CEST (UTC+02:00)	Falzerano 44'	Report	38' La Mantia; 55' Falco	Stadium: Stadio Renato Curi; Attendance: 7,878; Referee: Sacchi

28 April 2019 35	Lecce	1–0	Brescia	Lecce
21:00 CEST (UTC+02:00)	Tabanelli 80'	Report		Stadium: Stadio Via del Mare; Attendance: 21,860; Referee: Piccinini

1 May 2019 36	Padova	2–1	Lecce	Padua
15:00 CEST (UTC+02:00)	Baraye 3'; Cappelletti 56'	Report	74' (pen.) Mancosu	Stadium: Stadio Euganeo; Attendance: 9,338; Referee: Illuzzi

4 May 2019 37	rest

11 May 2019 38	Lecce	2–1	Spezia	Lecce
15:00 CEST (UTC+02:00)	Petriccione 9'; La Mantia 27'	Report	83' Capradossi	Stadium: Stadio Via del Mare; Attendance: 25,135; Referee: Rapuano

=== Coppa Italia ===
7 August 2018 Second round	Lecce	1–0 (a.e.t.)	Feralpisalò	Lecce
21:00 CEST (UTC+02:00)	Palombi 95'	Report		Stadium: Stadio Via del Mare; Attendance: 5,438; Referee: Nasca

11 August 2018 Third round	Genoa	4–0	Lecce	Genoa
21:15 CEST (UTC+02:00)	Piątek 2', 9', 18', 38'	Report		Stadium: Stadio Luigi Ferraris; Attendance: 10,000; Referee: La Penna
