= 2015–16 US Lecce season =

Lecce
2015–16 season
- President: Enrico Tundo
- Manager: Antonino Asta (until 12 October 2015); Piero Braglia (from 12 October 2015)
- Stadium: Stadio Via del Mare
- Lega Pro/C: 3rd
- Coppa Italia: Second round
- Coppa Italia Lega Pro: Round of 16
- Top goalscorer: League: Davide Moscardelli (10); All: Davide Moscardelli (12)
- Highest home attendance: 14,459 vs Foggia (22 May 2016, Lega Pro play-offs)
- Lowest home attendance: 779 vs Matera (28 October 2015, Coppa Italia Lega Pro)
- Average home league attendance: 7,271

The 2015–16 season was U.S. Lecce's fourth consecutive season in Lega Pro after their relegation from Serie A at the end of the 2011–12 season. The club competed in Lega Pro Girone C, finishing 3rd, in the Coppa Italia, where the club was knocked out in the second round by Cesena, and in the Coppa Italia Lega Pro, where the club was knocked out by Akragas in the round of 16.

== Players ==
=== Squad information ===
As of 19 October 2015

Note: Flags indicate national team as defined under FIFA eligibility rules; some limited exceptions apply. Players may hold more than one non-FIFA nationality.

No.	Pos.	Nation	Player
—	GK	ITA	Filippo Perucchini
—	GK	ITA	Massimiliano Benassi
—	GK	ITA	Marco Bleve
—	DF	ITA	Francesco Cosenza
—	DF	ITA	Raffaele Alcibiade
—	DF	ITA	Alessandro Camisa
—	DF	ITA	Gianluca Freddi
—	DF	ITA	Giuseppe Abruzzese
—	DF	ITA	Matteo Legittimo
—	DF	ITA	Matteo Liviero (on loan from Juventus)
—	DF	ITA	Andrea Beduschi
—	MF	ITA	Giuseppe De Feudis
—	MF	ITA	Stefano Salvi

No.	Pos.	Nation	Player
—	MF	ITA	Romeo Papini
—	MF	HUN	Bálint Vécsei (on loan from Bologna)
—	MF	ITA	Fabrizio Lo Sicco (on loan from Pistoiese)
—	MF	ITA	Franco Lepore
—	MF	ITA	Alessandro Carrozza
—	MF	URU	Juan Surraco
—	FW	FRA	Abdou Doumbia
—	FW	ITA	Salvatore Caturano
—	FW	ITA	Davis Curiale (on loan from Trapani)
—	FW	GAM	Ali Sowe (on loan from Chievo)
—	FW	ITA	Davide Moscardelli

=== out on loan ===
Note: Flags indicate national team as defined under FIFA eligibility rules; some limited exceptions apply. Players may hold more than one non-FIFA nationality.

No.	Pos.	Nation	Player
—	FW	ITA	Luigi Della Rocca (on loan at Rimini)
