= Sergio Contessa =

Italian footballer

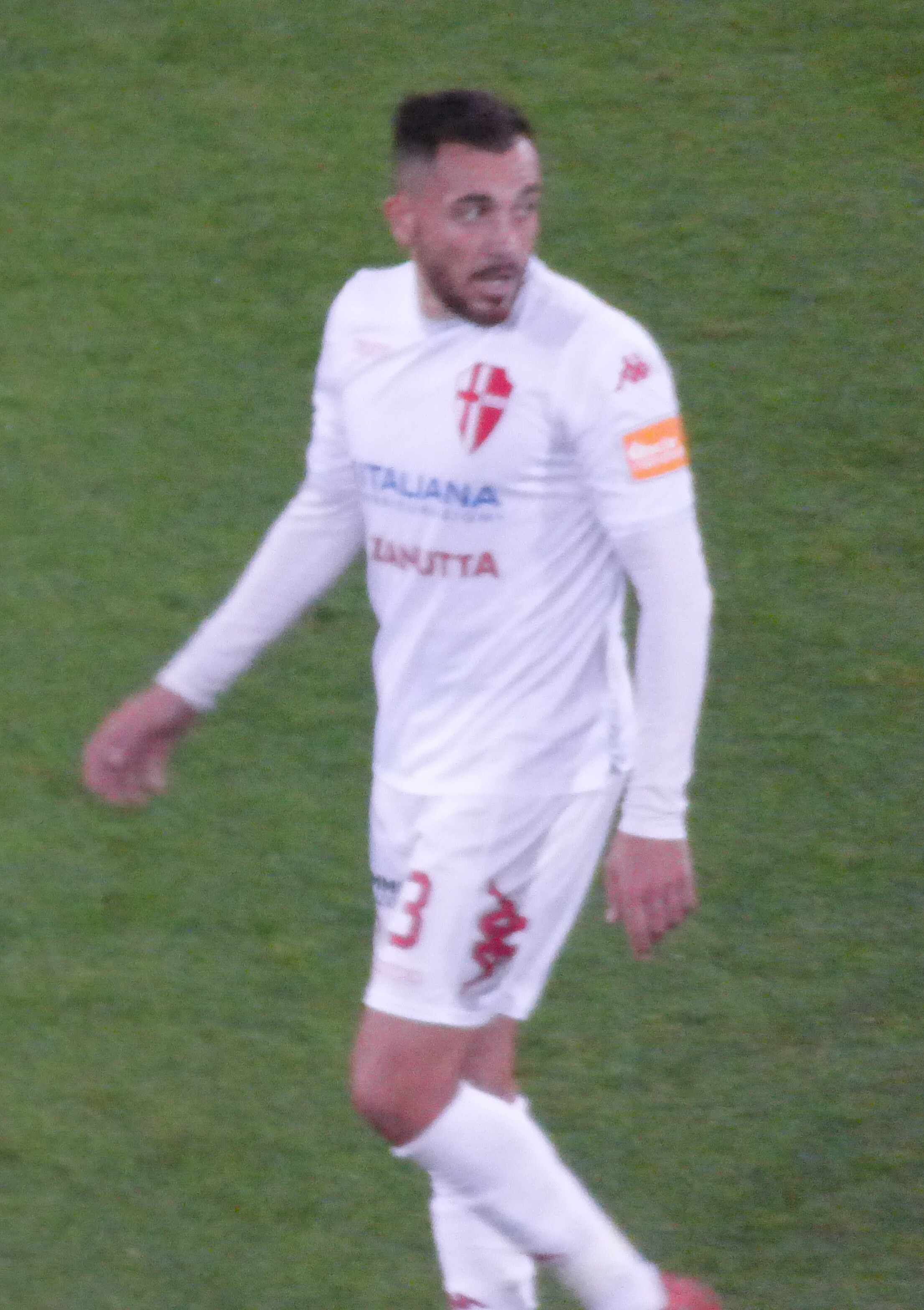
- Contessa in 2018

Personal information
- Full name: Sergio Donato Contessa
- Date of birth: 14 March 1990 (age 36)
- Place of birth: Francavilla Fontana, Italy
- Height: 1.79 m (5 ft 10 in)
- Position: Left-back

Youth career
- –2009: Lecce

Senior career*
Years	Team	Apps	(Gls)
2009–2010	Nardò		
2010–2011	Novara	0	(0)
2010–2011	→ Melfi (loan)	23	(0)
2011–2013	Fidelis Andria	45	(0)
2013–2014	Reggina	9	(0)
2014–2016	Juve Stabia	64	(4)
2016–2017	Lecce	12	(0)
2017	→ Reggiana (loan)	15	(1)
2017–2019	Padova	47	(2)
2019–2020	Feralpisalò	40	(0)
2020–2021	Catanzaro	35	(1)
2021–2022	Reggiana	33	(2)
2022–2024	Turris	60	(3)
2024–2025	Taranto	15	(0)
2025	Monopoli	9	(0)
- * Club domestic league appearances and goals as of 19 April 2025

Sergio Donato Contessa (born 14 March 1990) is an Italian footballer who plays as a left-back.

== Club career ==
Contessa made his Serie C debut for Fidelis Andria on 4 September 2011 in a game against Spezia.

On 15 January 2019, he signed a two-and-a-half-year contract with Feralpisalò.

On 20 January 2020, he moved to Catanzaro on a one-and-a-half-year contract.

On 9 July 2021, he returned to Reggiana on a two-year contract.

On 27 August 2022, Contessa signed a two-year contract with Turris.

On 28 August 2024, Contessa moved to Taranto.

On 10 January 2025, he joined to Monopoli.
