= Ndiaga Sall =

Senegalese footballer (born 2007)

Personal information
- Full name: Ndiaga Mouhamadou Sall
- Date of birth: 18 September 2009 (age 17)
- Place of birth: Senegal
- Height: 1.82 m (6 ft 0 in)
- Positions: Winger; forward

Team information
- Current team: Nardò
- Number: 20

Senior career*
Years	Team	Apps	(Gls)
–2025	Otranto		
2025–	Nardò	13	(3)
- * Club domestic league appearances and goals as of 9 May 2026

Ndiaga Mouhamadou Sall (born 18 June 2009) is a Senegalese professional footballer who plays as a winger or forward for Nardò.

== Early life ==
Sall was born on 18 June 2009. Born in Senegal, he is a native of M'Bour, Senegal.

== Club career ==
Sall started his career with Italian side Otranto. Following his stint there, he signed for Italian side Nardò ahead of the 2025–26 season. On 21 September 2025, he scored his first goal for the club during a 1–1 home draw with Gravina in the league.

On 2 March 2026 he was chosen to represent Serie D in the 2026 Viareggio cup and was the top scorer of the tournament with 6 goals in 5 games

== Style of play ==
Sall plays as a winger or forward. Italian newspaper la Repubblica wrote in 2025 that "he was strong, fast, had great acceleration, had an eye for goal and could shoot with both his right and left foot".
