= Drudi =

Drudi is a surname, and notable people with the it include:

- Dario Hernan Drudi (born 1987), Argentine football manager
- Mirko Drudi (born 1987), Italian footballer
