= Ferdinando Vitofrancesco =

Italian footballer

Personal information
- Date of birth: 4 August 1988 (age 38)
- Place of birth: Foggia, Italy
- Height: 1.70 m (5 ft 7 in)
- Positions: Right midfielder; right full-back

Team information
- Current team: Varese
- Number: 6

Youth career
- 2000–2007: Milan

Senior career*
Years	Team	Apps	(Gls)
2006–2007	Milan	0	(0)
2007–2011	Cremonese	92	(8)
2009–2010	→ Grosseto (loan)	33	(0)
2011–2013	Cittadella	74	(3)
2013–2014	Perugia	29	(1)
2014–2016	Alessandria	59	(2)
2016–2017	Lecce	31	(0)
2017–2018	FeralpiSalò	38	(0)
2018–2019	Audace Cerignola	19	(0)
2019–2020	Rende	24	(2)
2020–2021	Lavello	28	(3)
2021–2023	Casarano	43	(4)
2023–	Varese	4	(0)
- * Club domestic league appearances and goals as of 24 September 2023

Ferdinando Vitofrancesco (born August 4, 1988) is an Italian professional footballer who plays as a defender for Serie D club Varese.

== Club career ==
Vitofrancesco started playing in Milan's youth sector in 2000, at the age of 11.

On November 25, 2006, due to the large number of injuries suffered by various players, he got his first first-team call-up for a Serie A match against Messina. However, he didn't even manage to get a spot on the bench. He did three days later in a Coppa Italia game against Brescia, but eventually didn't enter the field.

In summer 2007 Vitofrancesco left for Cremonese in co-ownership deal for €5,000. In June 2008 the club purchased outright for an additional €70,000, made Milan booked the bonus of €65,000 as financial income.

In June 2011 he was signed by Serie B club Cittadella in exchange with Daniel Semenzato. He spent two years in Cittadella.

In 2013, he moved to Perugia.

In 2014, he was signed by Alessandria.

In July 2016 he left for Lecce.

On 7 September 2019, he joined Rende.

On 21 August 2020 he returned to Serie D with Lavello. He left Lavello on 30 December 2021 for fellow Serie D club Casarano.
