= Alessandro Carrozza =

Italian footballer (born 1982)

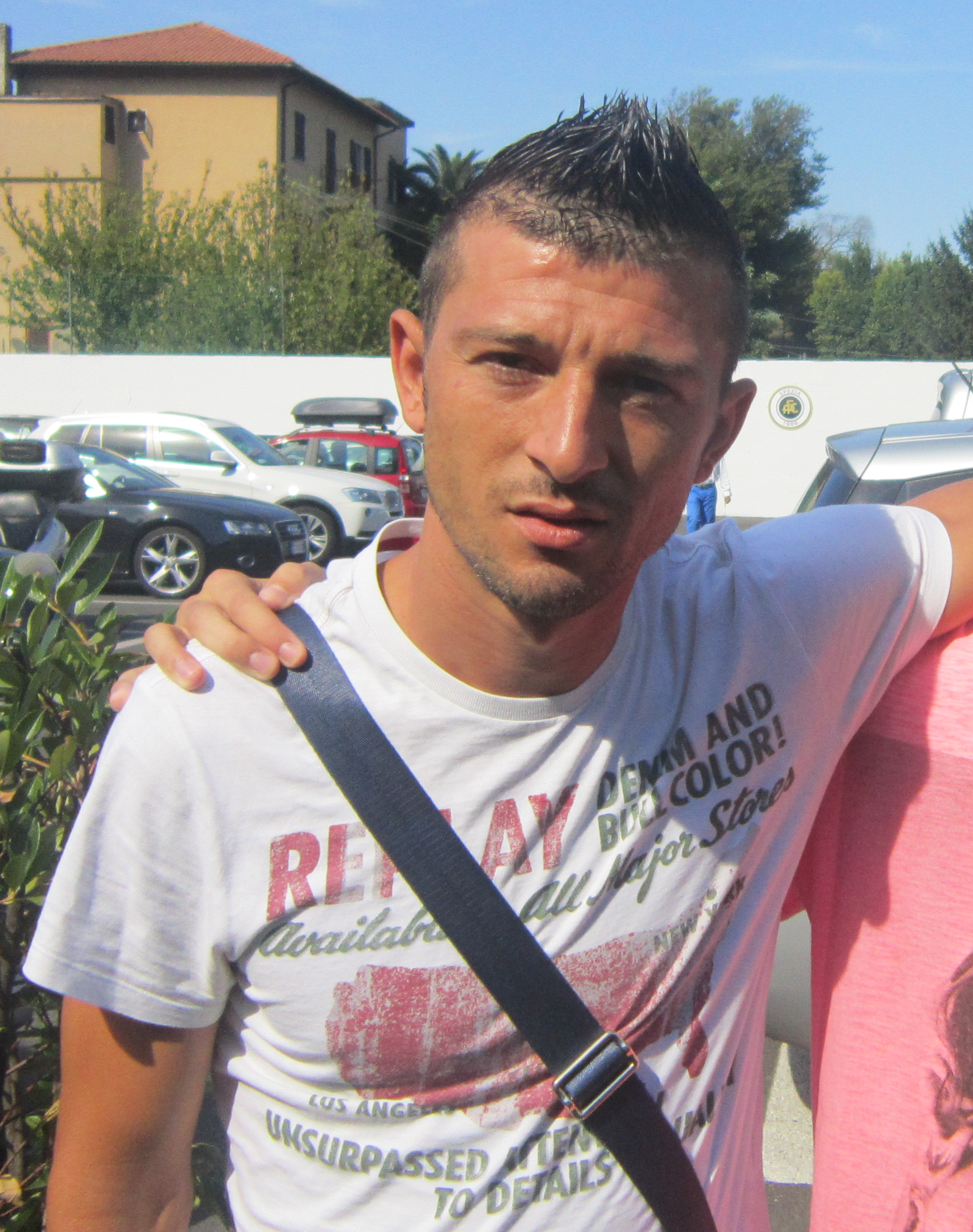

Personal information
- Date of birth: 1 February 1982 (age 44)
- Place of birth: Gallipoli, Italy
- Height: 1.74 m (5 ft 9 in)
- Position: Midfielder

Team information
- Current team: Città di Gallipoli (Manager)

Senior career*
Years	Team	Apps	(Gls)
–2007	Gallipoli	94	(20)
2003–2004	→ Taurisano (loan)		
2004–2005	→ Copertino (loan)		(15)
2007–2008	Pisa	15	(0)
2008–2009	Taranto	37	(6)
2009–2012	Varese	81	(19)
2012	→ Atalanta (loan)	13	(0)
2012–2014	Verona	14	(0)
2013–2014	→ Spezia (loan)	17	(2)
2014–2016	Lecce	30	(1)
2015	→ Juve Stabia (loan)	14	(1)
2016	Nardò		
2017–2019	Gallipoli		
2019	Antonio Toma Maglie		
2019–2020	Deghi		
2020–2021	Fiamma Jonica Gallipoli		

Managerial career
- 2021–: Città di Gallipoli
- * Club domestic league appearances and goals

Alessandro Carrozza (born 1 February 1982) is a retired Italian former footballer who played as midfielder.

== Biography ==
Carrozza's footballing career began later on than usual. He had aspirations of becoming a footballer when he was 18 years old, but instead he became a carpenter. When watching a Serie C game on television one day, he didn't think his abilities were any inferior to what he was watching. He joined his local team; the now defunct Gallipoli Calcio, playing in Italian football's eighth tier, working his way up through the leagues with various clubs. His dream of becoming a Serie A player came true in January 2012 when he joined Atalanta on loan, aged 30.

On 2 July, he signed a contract with Verona.

== Coaching career ==
In July 2021, Carrozza ended his career as player and was appointed manager of Città di Gallipoli. Ahead of the 2023-24 season, Carrozza secured promotion to the Italian Serie D.
