= Antonio Giosa =

Italian footballer (born 1983)

Personal information
- Date of birth: 21 August 1983 (age 43)
- Place of birth: Potenza, Italy
- Height: 1.85 m (6 ft 1 in)
- Position: Defender

Team information
- Current team: Pergolettese (manager)

Youth career
- Reggina

Senior career*
Years	Team	Apps	(Gls)
2002–2004	Cittadella	36	(1)
2004–2009	Reggina	21	(0)
2004–2005	→ Modena (loan)	1	(0)
2007–2008	→ Messina (loan)	25	(2)
2009–2010	Vicenza	20	(0)
2010–2013	Reggina	4	(0)
2011–2012	→ Lumezzane (loan)	24	(0)
2012–2013	→ Avellino (loan)	19	(0)
2013–2016	Como	51	(5)
2016–2017	Lecce	30	(0)
2017–2018	Alessandria	20	(0)
2018–2020	Potenza	40	(4)
2020–2021	Monopoli	9	(0)
2021	Catania	16	(2)
2021–2022	Lumezzane	6	(0)
2022–2023	Cast Brescia		
2023–2024	Ospitaletto		

Managerial career
- 2024–2025: Ospitaletto (youth)
- 2024–2026: Ospitaletto (assistant)
- 2026–: Pergolettese
- * Club domestic league appearances and goals

Antonio Giosa (born 21 August 1983) is an Italian football coach and a former defender who is the head coach of Serie C Group A club Pergolettese.

== Biography ==
On 29 June 2010 Reggina Calcio announced via their website that they have re-signed Giosa. Giosa's first words to the media where "I am really happy, I feel to be back home, the club that adopted me when I was 15. The five-year contract demonstrates the desire on my part and the club, to resume a path together"

On 31 August 2011 he left for the third division club Lumezzane. On 3 August 2012 he was signed by Avellino.

On 2 September 2013 he left for Como in temporary deal. On 11 July 2014 he renewed his contract with Como.

In July 2016 he moved to Lecce, where he spent a season before moving to Alessandria.

In July 2018 he was signed by Potenza.

On 20 August 2020 he agreed on a 2-year contract with Monopoli.

On 21 January 2021 he moved to Catania on a 1.5-year contract. On 30 August 2021, his Catania contract was terminated by mutual consent.

On 1 September 2021 he returned to Lumezzane in Eccellenza.
