= Alessandro Camisa =

Italian professional footballer (born 1985)

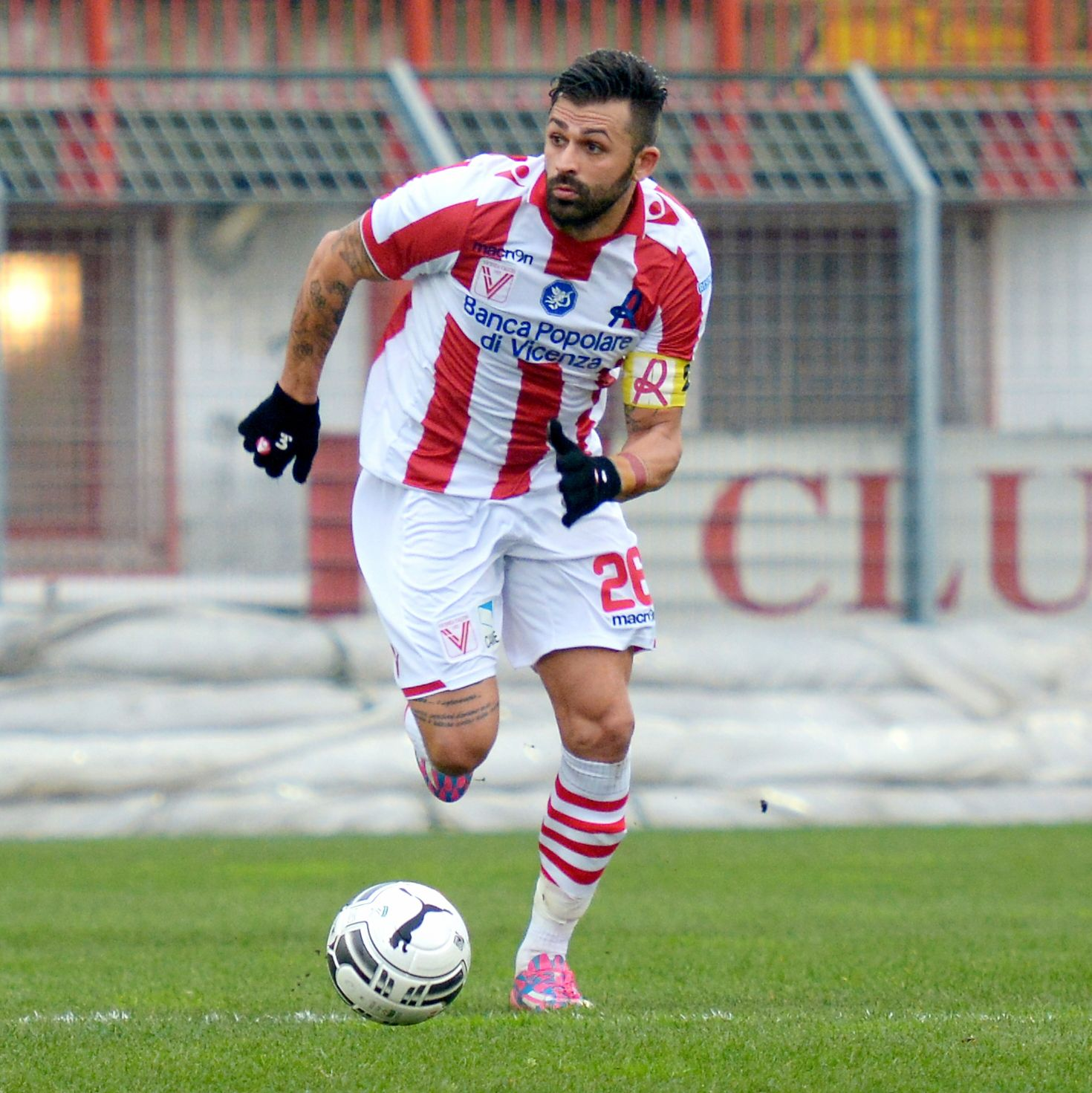

Personal information
- Date of birth: 13 April 1985 (age 41)
- Place of birth: San Cesario di Lecce, Italy
- Height: 1.79 m (5 ft 10 in)
- Position: Defender

Team information
- Current team: Nardò

Senior career*
Years	Team	Apps	(Gls)
2005–2008	Lecce	10	(0)
2007–2008	→ Sambenedettese (loan)	25	(0)
2008–2012	Varese	70	(0)
2012–2015	Vicenza	85	(2)
2015–2016	Lecce	14	(0)
2016–	Nardò		

International career^{‡}
2003	Italy U-18	2	(0)
2003	Italy U-19	3	(0)
2004–2005	Italy U-20	2	(0)
- * Club domestic league appearances and goals as of September 19, 2016 ‡ National team caps and goals as of April 27, 2005

Alessandro Camisa (born 13 April 1985) is an Italian former professional footballer who played as a defender for Nardò.

He played 2 seasons (9 games, no goals) in the Serie A for Lecce.

== Biography ==
On 24 August 2012 he was signed by Vicenza. On 31 August 2015 he was sold back to Lecce. On 20 September 2016 he was signed by Serie D club Nardò.
