= Kevin Vinetot =

French footballer (born 1988)

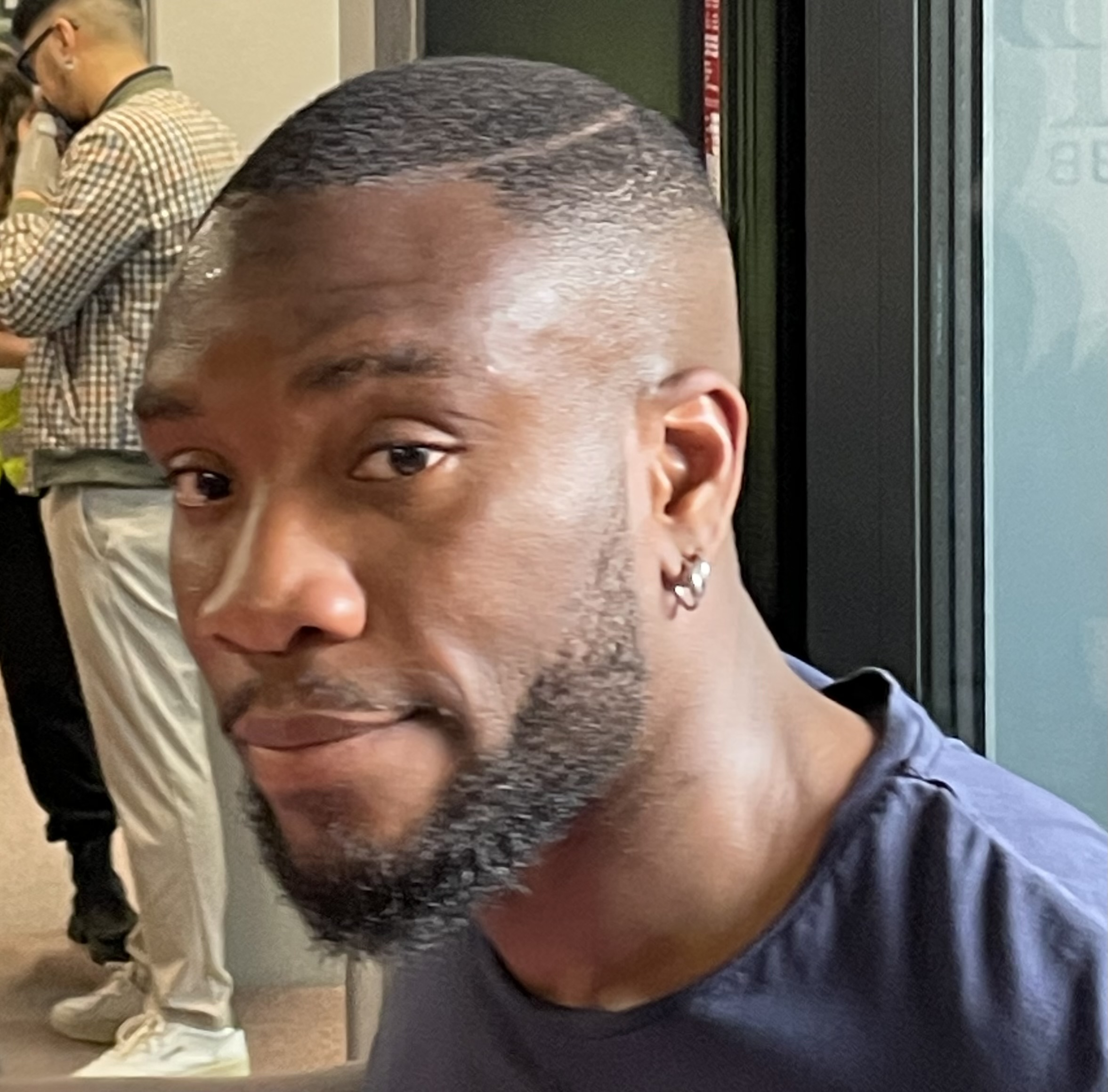
- Vinetot in 2024

Personal information
- Full name: Kevin Mathieu Vinetot
- Date of birth: 14 June 1988 (age 38)
- Place of birth: Villiers-le-Bel, France
- Height: 1.86 m (6 ft 1 in)
- Position: Centre-back

Team information
- Current team: Siracusa

Youth career
- Guingamp

Senior career*
Years	Team	Apps	(Gls)
2007–2008	Guingamp B		
2008–2010	Giulianova	72	(3)
2010–2013	Crotone	75	(2)
2013–2014	Genoa	0	(0)
2013–2014	→ Lecce (loan)	26	(1)
2014–2017	Lecce	21	(0)
2015–2016	→ AlbinoLeffe (loan)	32	(0)
2017	→ Mantova (loan)	15	(2)
2017–2024	Südtirol	151	(4)
2024–	Siracusa	0	(0)
- * Club domestic league appearances and goals as of 9 June 2024

Kevin Mathieu Vinetot (born 14 June 1988) is a French footballer who plays centre-back for Italian Serie D club Siracusa.

== Club career ==
Born in Villiers-le-Bel, suburb of Paris, Vinetot started in the reserve side of Guingamp. In mid-2008 he moved to Italian side Giulianova, winning the promotion playoffs. In 2009–10 season, he played all 34 league matches and both legs of relegation play-outs.

=== Crotone ===
In July 2010 he was transferred to Serie B team Crotone along with Francesco Migliore and Fabio Gubinelli.

=== Genoa ===
In June 2011 he was sold to Serie A team Genoa in co-ownership deal, for €1 million (€950,000 cash plus half of Leonardo Terigi) in 4-year contract. The deal made Crotone had a revenue of €2 million in Italian accounting. Vinetot signed a 4-year contract. But on 17 July 2011 he returned to Crotone. His loan and co-ownership was renewed in summer 2012 and in June 2013 for co-ownership only.

=== Lecce ===
On 2 August 2013 Vinetot joined Lecce in temporary deal. On 20 June 2014 Vinetot joined Genoa outright, as well as Terigi to Crotone outright.

On 12 August 2014 Vinetot was acquired by Lecce outright, with the residual 50% registration rights of Francesco Todisco went to Genoa.

=== AlbinoLeffe ===
In July 2015 he was loaned to AlbinoLeffe. He made 32 appearances in the Lega Pro.

=== Lecce and Mantova ===
He returned to Lecce and played three games for the team in the 2016–2017 Lega Pro season before moving to Mantova on loan on 31 January 2017.

=== Südtirol ===
On 17 July 2017 he moved to Südtirol on a permanent deal.

== Personal life ==
Vinetot was born in metropolitan France and is of Guadeloupean descent.
