= Giuseppe Maimone =

Italian footballer

Personal information
- Date of birth: 2 March 1994 (age 32)
- Place of birth: Taormina, Italy
- Height: 1.86 m (6 ft 1 in)
- Position: Midfielder

Team information
- Current team: Vigor Lamezia
- Number: 8

Youth career
- –2010: Sportinsieme Santa Teresa
- 2010–2013: Reggina

Senior career*
Years	Team	Apps	(Gls)
2013–2015	Reggina	25	(3)
2013–2014	→ Cuneo (loan)	15	(0)
2015–2016	Melfi	29	(1)
2016–2019	Lecce	15	(1)
2017–2018	→ Matera (loan)	32	(4)
2018–2019	→ Monopoli (loan)	27	(0)
2019–2020	Sicula Leonzio	24	(0)
2020	Picerno	0	(0)
2020–2021	Bisceglie	34	(1)
2021–2023	Lamezia Terme	59	(9)
2023	San Marzano	8	(2)
2023–2024	Nocerina	20	(0)
2024–2025	Licata	31	(4)
2025	San Marino	8	(0)
2026–	Vigor Lamezia	0	(0)
- * Club domestic league appearances and goals as of 17 February 2026

Giuseppe Maimone (born 2 March 1994) is an Italian footballer who plays as a midfielder for Serie D club Vigor Lamezia.

== Club career ==
He made his Serie C debut for Reggina on 19 September 2014 in a game against Lecce.

On 24 August 2018, he joined Monopoli on loan for the 2018–19 season.

On 19 July 2019, he signed with Sicula Leonzio.

On 18 August 2020 he moved to Picerno.

On 1 October 2020 he joined Bisceglie.
