= Giuseppe Agostinone =

Italian footballer (born 1988)

Personal information
- Date of birth: 6 April 1988 (age 38)
- Place of birth: Foggia, Italy
- Height: 1.72 m (5 ft 8 in)
- Position: Defender

Youth career
- Foggia

Senior career*
Years	Team	Apps	(Gls)
2004–2016	Foggia	123	(8)
2006–2007	→ Martina Franca (loan)	3	(0)
2009–2010	→ Pro Vercelli (loan)	18	(2)
2012	→ Montichiari (loan)	8	(0)
2016–2017	Piacenza	22	(0)
2017	Lecce	9	(0)
2017–2018	Virtus Francavilla	32	(1)
2018–2020	Alessandria	26	(0)
2020	Lecco	1	(0)
2020–2021	Foggia	18	(0)
2021–2022	Novara	25	(0)
2022–2023	Sambenedettese	26	(0)
2023–2024	Siena		

Managerial career
- 2024: Latina (assistant)
- * Club domestic league appearances and goals

Giuseppe Agostinone (born 6 April 1988) is an Italian football coach and a former defender.

== Career ==
Agostinone started his career in local Foggia, where he played more than 100 third-and fourth-tier matches. He was loaned several times to smaller teams like Martina Franca, Pro Vercelli and Montichiari, before he left his hometown and signed to Piacenza in 2016. He spent half year in Lecce, then another half year in the Virtus Francavilla, before Alessandria signed him.

On 31 January 2020 Agostinone signed with Lecco.

On 9 October 2020, he returned to Foggia.

In September 2021, he moved to Novara.

On 11 August 2022, Agostinone joined Sambenedettese in Serie D.

== Sources ==
- Giuseppe Agostinone at Soccerway (archived)
- Giuseppe Agostinone at TuttoCalciatori.net (in Italian)
