= Mirko Drudi =

Italian footballer

Personal information
- Date of birth: 22 February 1987 (age 39)
- Place of birth: Cesena, Italy
- Height: 1.82 m (6 ft 0 in)
- Position: Centre-back

Team information
- Current team: La Fiorita

Youth career
- –2006: Cesena

Senior career*
Years	Team	Apps	(Gls)
2006–2007	Cesena	2	(0)
2007–2008	→ Poggibonsi (loan)	10	(0)
2009–2010	→ Bassano Virtus (loan)	7	(0)
2010–2011	→ Valenzana (loan)	23	(2)
2011–2012	Bassano Virtus	19	(0)
2012–2013	Novese	11	(0)
2013	Riccione	14	(1)
2013–2014	Romagna Centro	18	(4)
2014–2015	Forlì	44	(5)
2015–2016	Santarcangelo	23	(0)
2016–2018	Lecce	36	(0)
2018	Trapani	14	(2)
2018–2019	Cittadella	24	(0)
2019–2022	Pescara	62	(2)
2022–2023	Monopoli	14	(0)
2023–2025	Forlì	41	(0)
2025–	La Fiorita	0	(0)
- * Club domestic league appearances and goals as of 4 May 2025

Mirko Drudi (born 22 February 1987) is an Italian professional footballer who plays as a centre-back for Sammarinese club La Fiorita.

== Club career ==
On 2 September 2019, he joined Pescara.

On 26 July 2022, Drudi signed a two-year contract with Monopoli. On 4 August 2023, his contract with Monopoli was terminated by mutual consent.

On 25 October 2023, Drudi signed for Serie D club Forlì.
