= Simone Ciancio =

Italian professional football player

Personal information
- Date of birth: 18 July 1987 (age 39)
- Place of birth: Cologna Veneta, Italy
- Height: 1.82 m (6 ft 0 in)
- Position: Defender

Team information
- Current team: Asti
- Number: 23

Youth career
- Sampdoria

Senior career*
Years	Team	Apps	(Gls)
2006–2008	Sampdoria	0	(0)
2007–2008	→ Pizzighettone (loan)	28	(0)
2008–2012	Alessandria	88	(4)
2012–2013	Cittadella	44	(2)
2013–2014	Juve Stabia	16	(0)
2014–2016	Cosenza	57	(2)
2016–2018	Lecce	53	(1)
2018–2019	Catania	16	(0)
2019–2020	Carrarese	23	(0)
2020–2022	Avellino	61	(1)
2022–2023	Novara	34	(0)
2023–2024	Alessandria	33	(0)
2024–	Asti	12	(0)
- * Club domestic league appearances and goals as of 10 November 2024

Simone Ciancio (born 18 July 1987) is an Italian professional footballer who plays as a defender for Serie D club Asti.

== Club career ==
On 2 August 2019, he joined Carrarese.

On 28 August 2020, he signed a one-year contract with Avellino.

On 18 July 2022, Ciancio moved to Novara.

On 18 July 2023, Ciancio returned to Alessandria.

In August 2024 his signing by Asti was announced.

== Personal life ==
On 7 March 2022, he tested positive for COVID-19.
