= Gianmarco Chironi =

Italian football player

Personal information
- Date of birth: 7 September 1997 (age 29)
- Place of birth: Nardò, Italy
- Height: 1.83 m (6 ft 0 in)
- Position: Goalkeeper

Youth career
- –2014: Lecce

Senior career*
Years	Team	Apps	(Gls)
2013–2020	Lecce	1	(0)
2015–2016	→ Nardò (loan)	34	(0)
2018–2019	→ Virtus Verona (loan)	14	(0)
2025-	Solbiatese	38	(0)
- * Club domestic league appearances and goals as of 2 June 2026

Gianmarco Chironi (born 7 September 1997) is an Italian football player.

== Club career ==
He made his Serie C debut for Lecce on 6 May 2018 in a game against Monopoli.

In April 2025, he arrived in the Kings League Italy, playing the playoffs with Manuuxo’s Gear7. He also played with them in the Club World Cup in June and the Kings Cup in October before transferring to the Underdogs for the second split of the Kings League Italy. In January 2026, he was called up to play in the Kings League World Cup for Nations.
