= Mattia Persano =

Italian footballer

Personal information
- Date of birth: 21 September 1996 (age 30)
- Place of birth: San Donato di Lecce, Italy
- Height: 1.87 m (6 ft 2 in)
- Position: Forward

Team information
- Current team: Notaresco
- Number: 90

Youth career
- –2016: Lecce
- 2014–2015: → Napoli (loan)
- 2015–2016: → Bologna (loan)

Senior career*
Years	Team	Apps	(Gls)
2014–2019	Lecce	14	(1)
2017	→ Siracusa (loan)	5	(1)
2017	→ Modena (loan)	5	(0)
2018–2019	→ Arezzo (loan)	27	(3)
2019–2020	Hermannstadt	2	(0)
2020	Rieti	7	(2)
2020–2021	Turris	23	(3)
2021	Vibonese	10	(0)
2021–2022	Arezzo	18	(9)
2022	Luparense	11	(3)
2022–2023	Romana	21	(3)
2023	Santa Maria Cilento	13	(1)
2023–2024	Fasano	19	(2)
2024–	Notaresco	11	(2)
- * Club domestic league appearances and goals as of 10 November 2024

Mattia Persano (born 21 September 1996) is an Italian football player who plays for Serie D club Notaresco.

== Club career ==
He made his Serie C debut for Lecce on 14 September 2016 in a game against Catanzaro.

On 31 January 2020, he returned to Italy and signed with Rieti.

On 13 August 2020 he joined Turris.

On 17 December 2021, his contract with Vibonese was terminated by mutual consent. On 20 December 2021, he returned to Arezzo.
