= Marco Mancosu =

Italian footballer (born 1988)

Personal information
- Full name: Marco Mancosu
- Date of birth: 22 August 1988 (age 38)
- Place of birth: Cagliari, Italy
- Height: 1.77 m (5 ft 10 in)
- Position: Midfielder

Youth career
- –2008: Siracusa

Senior career*
Years	Team	Apps	(Gls)
2007–2010	Cagliari	13	(1)
2008–2009	→ Rimini (loan)	5	(0)
2009–2010	→ Empoli (loan)	7	(0)
2010–2011	Siracusa	32	(3)
2011–2012	Cagliari	0	(0)
2011–2012	→ Siracusa (loan)	36	(8)
2012–2014	Benevento	60	(15)
2014–2016	Casertana	57	(11)
2016–2021	Lecce	160	(48)
2021–2022	SPAL	35	(6)
2022–2024	Cagliari	29	(5)

International career
2004	Italy U16	5	(0)
2004–2005	Italy U17	10	(0)
2006	Italy U19	0	(0)
2007–2008	Italy U20	4	(0)
2009	Italy U21	1	(0)
- * Club domestic league appearances and goals as of 9 June 2024

Marco Mancosu (born 22 August 1988) is an Italian professional footballer who plays as a midfielder.

== Club career ==
=== Cagliari ===
Born in Cagliari, Sardinia, Mancosu started his career with hometown club Cagliari Calcio and made his first team debut in the last round of 2006–07 season, also scoring a goal in his first top-flight appearance, and then made 10 first team appearances in the following 2007–08 season.

He joined Serie B side Rimini Calcio on loan for the 2008–09 season in order to gain more first team experience. He joined Empoli on loan on 10 August 2009.

=== Siracusa ===
On 13 August 2010, it was confirmed that Mancosu was sold to Lega Pro Prima Divisione side U.S. Siracusa, on a co-ownership deal. The Sicilian club, recently underwent a second consecutive promotion from the Serie D in 2008 to the Lega Pro Prima Divisione this season.

In June 2011, Cagliari bought back Mancosu from the co-owner.

In August 2011, he returned to Siracusa on a season-long loan deal. Mancosu was a key person for Siracusa successful campaign which was the first before the winter break.

=== Benevento ===
In 2012, he moved to Benevento, where he spent two years.

=== Casertana ===
In 2014, he was signed by Casertana, where he spent two seasons.

=== Lecce ===
In July 2016 he joined Lecce. He made his debut with the giallorossi side on 30 July 2016, in a 2–1 home win against AltoVicentino in the Coppa Italia. He was a regular starter for the team in Lega Pro during the 2016–17 and 2017–18 seasons. On 27 August 2018 he scored in an away fixture against Benevento, in his first Serie B game in eight years. In January 2019, he was named the team's new captain, as his predecessor, Franco Lepore, had recently been sold by the club.

=== Return to Cagliari ===
On 17 August 2022, Mancosu's contract with SPAL was terminated by mutual consent. On the next day, Mancosu signed a two-year contract with Cagliari.

== International career ==
On 12 August 2009, he made his debut with the Italy under-21 team in a friendly game against Russia. Mancosu played all 5 matches of 2005 UEFA European Under-17 Football Championship and all 3 matches of 2005 FIFA U-17 World Championship.

== Personal life ==
Mancosu has two brothers who are also professional footballers, the elder Matteo and the youngest Marcello. In May 2021, Mancosu revealed that an operation that he had earlier in the year in March was to remove a tumour and on 26 May 2021 Mancosu was declared free of cancer.

== Career statistics ==
As of match played 18 December 2021

Appearances and goals by club, season and competition
Club	Season	League			Cup		Other		Total	
Club	Season	Division	Apps	Goals	Apps	Goals	Apps	Goals	Apps	Goals
Cagliari	2006–07	Serie A	1	1	0	0	—		1	1
Cagliari	2006–07	Serie A	10	0	0	0	—		10	0
Cagliari	2008–09	Serie A	2	0	0	0	—		2	0
Cagliari	Total		13	1	0	0	—	—	13	1
Rimini (loan)	2008–09	Serie B	5	0	1	0	—		6	0
Empoli (loan)	2009–10	Serie B	7	0	1	0	—		8	0
Siracusa	2010–11	Lega Pro Prima Divisione	32	3	0	0	—		32	3
Cagliari	2011–12	Serie A	0	0	0	0	—		0	0
Siracusa (loan)	2011–12	Lega Pro Prima Divisione	34	8	0	0	2	0	36	8
Benevento	2012–13	Lega Pro Prima Divisione	29	8	2	1	—		31	9
Benevento	2013–14	Lega Pro Prima Divisione	30	7	3	0	3	1	36	8
Benevento	2014–15	Lega Pro Prima Divisione	1	0	2	0	—		3	0
Benevento	Total		60	15	7	1	3	1	70	17
Casertana	2014–15	Lega Pro Prima Divisione	30	6	1	0	—		31	6
Casertana	2015–16	Lega Pro	27	5	0	0	1	0	28	5
Casertana	Total		57	11	1	0	1	0	59	11
Lecce	2016–17	Lega Pro	30	6	3	1	4	0	37	7
Lecce	2017–18	Lega Pro	33	7	6	1	2	0	41	8
Lecce	2018–19	Serie B	34	13	2	0	—		36	13
Lecce	2019–20	Serie A	33	14	0	0	—		33	14
Lecce	2020–21	Serie B	30	8	1	0	2	0	33	8
Lecce	Total		160	48	12	2	8	0	180	50
S.P.A.L.	2021–22	Serie B	18	4	0	0	—		18	4
Career total			386	90	20	3	12	1	425	94
