= Linas Mėgelaitis =

Lithuanian footballer (born 1998)

Personal information
- Date of birth: 9 September 1998 (age 28)
- Place of birth: Šilutė, Lithuania
- Height: 1.78 m (5 ft 10 in)
- Position: Midfielder

Team information
- Current team: Perugia
- Number: 32

Youth career
- 2011–2012: Panevėžys
- 2012–2014: Šiauliai
- 2014–2015: Stumbras
- 2015: Pro Vercelli
- 2016–2017: → Latina (loan)

Senior career*
Years	Team	Apps	(Gls)
2015–2018	Švyturys Marijampolė		
2016–2017	→ Latina (loan)	1	(0)
2017–2018	→ Lecce (loan)	6	(0)
2018–2019	Lecce	0	(0)
2019	→ Sicula Leonzio (loan)	12	(0)
2019–2020	Sicula Leonzio	13	(0)
2020–2021	Gubbio	29	(0)
2021–2023	Viterbese	62	(2)
2023–2025	Rimini	69	(0)
2025–	Perugia	36	(0)

International career^{‡}
2013–2014	Lithuania U17	4	(1)
2015–2016	Lithuania U18	9	(0)
2015–2016	Lithuania U19	10	(0)
2017–2020	Lithuania U21	16	(1)
2020–	Lithuania	11	(1)
- * Club domestic league appearances and goals as of 10 September 2026 ‡ National team caps and goals as of 12 July 2022

Linas Mėgelaitis (born 9 September 1998) is a Lithuanian professional footballer who plays as a midfielder for Serie D club Perugia.

== Club career ==
Mėgelaitis began his career with FK Panevėžys team, moving to FK Šiauliai, and FC Stumbras in quick succession. He joined Latina after a short spell with Pro Vercelli. Mėgelaitis made his professional debut for Latina in a 2–1 Serie B away loss to Avellino on 18 May 2017.

On 2 September 2019, he returned to Sicula Leonzio on a permanent basis following the loan in the previous season.

On 8 January 2020, he signed with another Serie C club, Gubbio, until the end of the 2019–20 season.

On 29 July 2021, he signed a three-year contract with Viterbese.

On 11 August 2023, Mėgelaitis joined Rimini on a two-year deal.

== International career ==
He made his debut for Lithuania national football team on 11 November 2020 in a friendly game against Faroe Islands.

Scores and results list Lithuania's goal tally first.

List of international goals scored by Linas Mėgelaitis
No.	Date	Venue	Opponent	Score	Result	Competition
1	25 March 2022	Stadio Olimpico di Serravalle, Serravalle, San Marino	San Marino	2–0	2–1	Friendly
