= Juan Surraco =

Uruguayan footballer (born 1987)

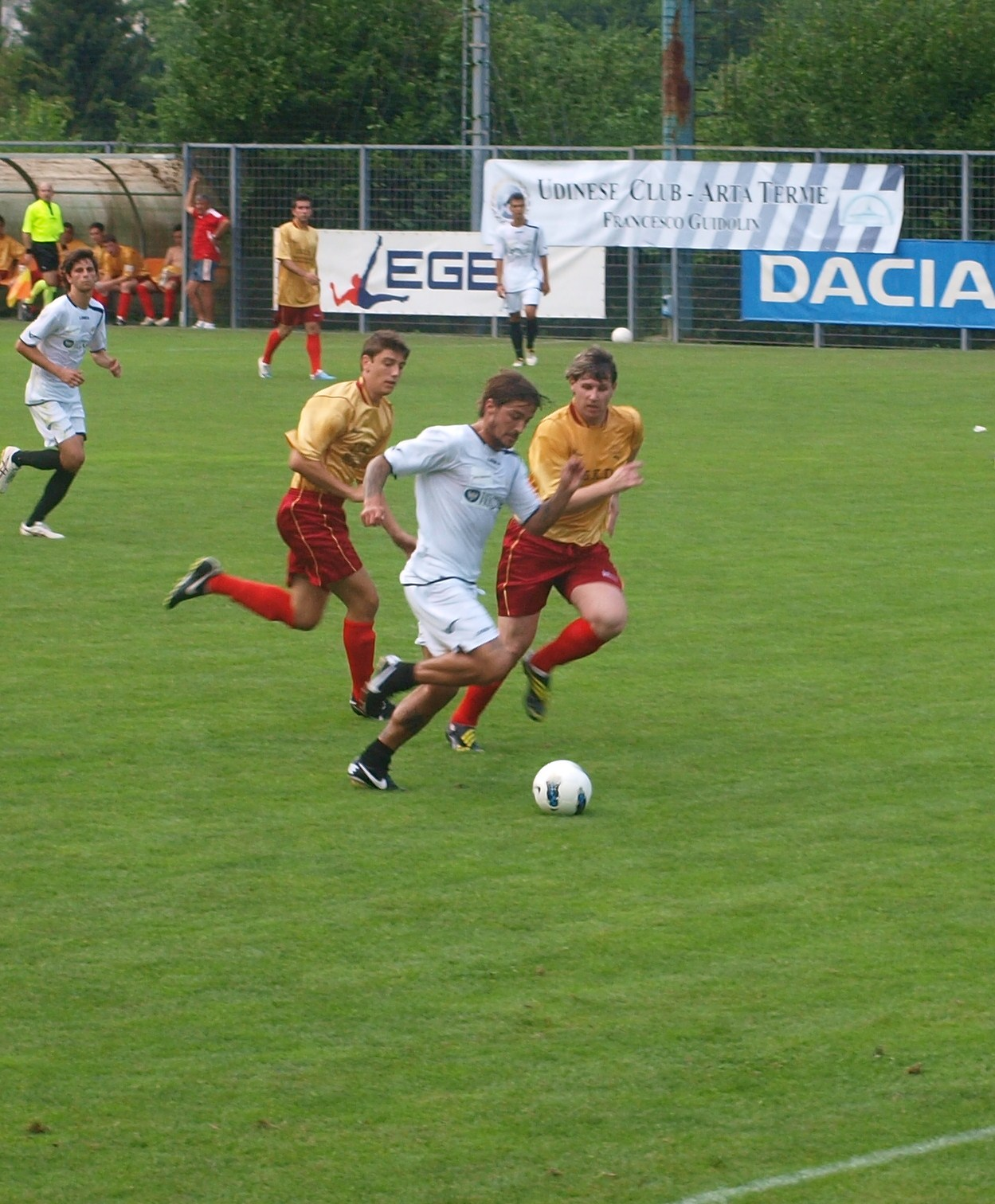
- Surraco playing for Udinese in 2011

Personal information
- Full name: Juan Ignacio Surraco Lamé
- Date of birth: 14 August 1987 (age 39)
- Place of birth: Montevideo, Uruguay
- Height: 1.76 m (5 ft 9 in)
- Position: Midfielder

Team information
- Current team: Prato

Senior career*
Years	Team	Apps	(Gls)
2005–2006	Central Español	12	(1)
2006–2013	Udinese	0	(0)
2007–2008	→ Messina (loan)	24	(0)
2008–2010	→ Ancona (loan)	72	(5)
2010–2011	→ Livorno (loan)	25	(5)
2011–2012	→ Torino (loan)	23	(1)
2012–2013	→ Modena (loan)	27	(1)
2013	Modena	6	(1)
2014	Cittadella	18	(2)
2014	Livorno	4	(0)
2015	El Tanque Sisley	7	(0)
2015–2016	Lecce	28	(6)
2016–2017	Ternana	14	(0)
2017	FeralpiSalò	7	(1)
2017–2018	Pistoiese	33	(1)
2019–	Prato	8	(1)

International career
–2007	Uruguay U20	3	(0)
2006	Uruguay	2	(0)
- * Club domestic league appearances and goals as of 21:28, 12 May 2019 (UTC)

Juan Ignacio Surraco Lamé (born 14 August 1987) is a Uruguayan professional football midfielder for A.C. Prato.

== Club career ==
Surraco was born in Montevideo, Uruguay, and at an early age decided to dedicate himself to sports. He was scouted at fifteen by Central Español, where he began his professional career in 2006.

In 2006, he was signed by Italian club Udinese.

In August 2007, he went on loan to Italian Serie B team F.C. Messina.

In March 2015, he returned to his native country to play for El Tanque Sisley.

In August 2015, he was signed by Italian club U.S. Lecce. He scored 6 goals in 28 Lega Pro matches.

In July 2016, he was signed by Serie B side Ternana with a one-year deal. He made 14 appearances in Serie B before moving to FeralpiSalò on 25 January 2017. He picked number 9 shirt.

Surraco joined A.C. Prato on 29 January 2019.

== International career ==
His talent caught the attention of the team coach and he was soon a regular starter for the team in the Uruguayan football league. At the same time he also impressed scouts for the Uruguay national football team, though he would have to wait a few years and join the U-20 team after he turned eighteen.

On 23 June 2007, he suffered a knee trauma and his participation in the upcoming 2007 FIFA U-20 World Cup was at one point in doubt, but eventually he played with the Uruguayan U20 team which drew 2–2 against Spain, beat Jordan 1–0, lost 2–0 against Zambia, and was eliminated in the second round losing 2–1 against the United States of America. Like his team mates Cavani and Suárez, Surraco played in all these games except against Zambia.
