= Romeo Papini =

Italian footballer

Personal information
- Date of birth: 21 March 1983 (age 43)
- Place of birth: Rome, Italy
- Height: 1.80 m (5 ft 11 in)
- Position: Midfielder

Team information
- Current team: Voluntas Spoleto

Senior career*
Years	Team	Apps	(Gls)
2000–2009	Ternana	84	(2)
2003–2004	→ Legnano (loan)	28	(0)
2004–2005	→ Pavia (loan)	29	(1)
2006–2007	→ Pescara (loan)	25	(0)
2009–2011	Grosseto	30	(0)
2011–2012	Spezia	12	(1)
2012–2013	Carpi	14	(1)
2013–2016	Lecce	80	(9)
2016–2017	Matera	0	(0)
2017–2018	Pistoiese	19	(0)
2018–	Voluntas Spoleto		
- * Club domestic league appearances and goals as of 11 May 2018

Romeo Papini (born 21 March 1983) is an Italian footballer who plays for Voluntas Spoleto.

== Biography ==
Born in Rome, Lazio, Papini started his career at Serie B team Ternana.

Later, between 2003 and 2005 he was loaned to Legnano and Pavia. In the 2005–06 season he returned to plays with Ternana. On 24 August 2006 passes on loan with the right of redemption to Pescara.

At the end of season he returns to Ternana, where he remained two seasons. In the summer session of the transfer passes outright to Grosseto in Serie B, and on 24 June 2011 passes to Spezia.

On 28 August 2012, after being released by Spezia, he signed a one-year contract with Carpi, where he gained promotion to Serie B.

In 2013, he moved to Lecce. He spent three seasons with the giallorossi and was captain of the team. He amassed a total of 87 appearances and scored 10 goals (including the play-offs).

In July 2016 he was signed by Matera on a free transfer with a two-year deal.
