= Mario Pacilli =

Italian footballer

Personal information
- Date of birth: 25 April 1987 (age 39)
- Place of birth: L'Aquila, Italy
- Height: 1.73 m (5 ft 8 in)
- Positions: Attacking midfielder; winger

Youth career
- Lodigiani
- 2003–2006: Ternana

Senior career*
Years	Team	Apps	(Gls)
2006–2007	Ternana	25	(1)
2007–2008	Chiasso	20	(5)
2008–2009	Avellino	20	(0)
2009–2011	Pro Patria	55	(11)
2011–2013	AlbinoLeffe	35	(2)
2013–2014	Trapani	34	(2)
2014–2015	L'Aquila	31	(7)
2015–2016	Cremonese	15	(3)
2016–2018	Lecce	43	(6)
2018–2020	Viterbese Castrense	34	(8)
2020–2021	Casertana	22	(4)
2021–2022	Taranto	18	(1)
- * Club domestic league appearances and goals

Mario Pacilli (born 25 April 1987) is an Italian former professional footballer who played as an attacking midfielder and winger

== Career ==
On 8 September 2021, he signed with Serie C club Taranto.
