= Antonio Marino =

Italian footballer (born 1988)

Personal information
- Date of birth: 9 August 1988 (age 38)
- Place of birth: Mazara del Vallo, Italy
- Height: 1.88 m (6 ft 2 in)
- Position: Defender

Team information
- Current team: Messina
- Number: 15

Senior career*
Years	Team	Apps	(Gls)
2006–2007	Folgore Selinunte		
2007–2011	Udinese	0	(0)
2008–2009	→ Juve Stabia (loan)	15	(3)
2009–2011	→ Ascoli (loan)	46	(1)
2011–2012	Reggina	25	(0)
2013	Varese	2	(0)
2013–2014	Cittadella	15	(0)
2014–2015	Venezia	19	(3)
2015–2016	Pavia	24	(2)
2016–2017	Modena	8	(0)
2017–2019	Lecce	40	(1)
2019–2021	Venezia	10	(0)
2021–2023	Carrarese	60	(0)
2023–2024	Latina	23	(1)
2024–	Messina	11	(0)
- * Club domestic league appearances and goals as of 18 December 2024

Antonio Marino (born 9 August 1988) is an Italian professional footballer who plays as a defender for Serie D club Messina.

== Career ==
Marino started his career with amateur Eccellenza club Folgore Selinunte from Castelvetrano, until he was noticed by Udinese scout and former Italy international footballer Andrea Carnevale. He successively agreed to join the Primavera under-20 team of Udinese, also serving as team captain throughout the 2007–08 season. He then spent the 2008–09 season on loan to Lega Pro Prima Divisione club Juve Stabia, where he collected 15 first team appearances.

In July 2009 Marino was loaned out again, this time to Serie B outfit Ascoli. After making fourteen appearances in his first full season at Serie B level, his loan deal was then extended also for the following 2010–11 season.

On 8 July 2019, he signed a 2-year contract with Venezia.

On 29 June 2021, he joined Carrarese on a two-year contract.

On 19 July 2023, he joined Latina.
