= Marco Bleve =

Italian footballer

Personal information
- Date of birth: 18 October 1995 (age 31)
- Place of birth: San Cesario di Lecce, Italy
- Height: 1.84 m (6 ft 0 in)
- Position: Goalkeeper

Team information
- Current team: Lecce
- Number: 1

Youth career
- –2013: Lecce

Senior career*
Years	Team	Apps	(Gls)
2013–2025	Lecce	31	(0)
2014–2015	→ Martina Franca (loan)	36	(0)
2017–2018	→ Ternana (loan)	9	(0)
2020	→ Catanzaro (loan)	10	(0)
2023–2025	→ Carrarese (loan)	62	(0)
2025–2026	Carrarese	37	(0)
2026–	Lecce	0	(0)
- * Club domestic league appearances and goals as of 23 August 2026

Marco Bleve (born 18 October 1995) is an Italian professional footballer who plays as a goalkeeper for Serie A club Lecce.

== Club career ==
He made his Serie C debut for Lecce on 22 September 2013 in a game against Catanzaro.

On 25 January 2020, he joined Catanzaro on loan for the remainder of the 2019–20 season.

On 8 August 2023, Bleve was loaned to Carrarese. With Carrarese, he won promotion to Serie B as national playoff winners. On 11 July 2024, Bleve's loan to Carrarese was extended for one further season for the club's 2024–25 Serie B campaign.

On 7 July 2025, Bleve returned to Carrarese on a permanent basis.

On 19 August 2026, Bleve returned to Lecce with a two-season contract.

== Career statistics ==
As of match played 8 May 2026

Appearances and goals by club, season and competition
Club	Season	League			National cup		Other		Total	
Club	Season	Division	Apps	Goals	Apps	Goals	Apps	Goals	Apps	Goals
Lecce	2012–13	Lega Pro 1D	0	0	1	0	0	0	1	0
Lecce	2013–14	Lega Pro 1D	3	0	3	0	—		6	0
Lecce	2015–16	Lega Pro	6	0	0	0	0	0	6	0
Lecce	2016–17	Lega Pro	12	0	0	0	0	0	12	0
Lecce	2018–19	Serie B	5	0	0	0	—		5	0
Lecce	2019–20	Serie A	0	0	0	0	—		16	0
Lecce	2020–21	Serie B	0	0	1	0	0	0	1	0
Lecce	2021–22	Serie B	5	0	2	0	—		7	0
Lecce	2022–23	Serie A	0	0	0	0	—		0	0
Lecce	Total		31	0	3	0	4	0	38	0
Martina Franca (loan)	2013–14	Lega Pro 2D	1	0	—		—		1	0
Martina Franca (loan)	2014–15	Lega Pro 1D	36	0	2	0	1	0	39	0
Martina Franca (loan)	Total		37	0	2	0	1	0	40	0
Ternana (loan)	2017–18	Serie B	9	0	0	0	—		9	0
Catanzaro (loan)	2019–20	Serie C	8	0	—		2	0	10	0
Carrarese (loan)	2023–24	Serie C	38	0	1	0	8	0	47	0
Carrarese (loan)	2024–25	Serie B	24	0	2	0	—		26	0
Carrarese	2025–26	Serie B	37	0	1	0	—		38	0
Carrarese	Total		99	0	4	0	8	0	111	0
Lecce	2026–27	Serie A	0	0	0	0	—		0	0
Career total			246	0	16	0	19	0	281	0
