= Francesco Cosenza =

Italian footballer

Personal information
- Date of birth: 5 February 1986 (age 40)
- Place of birth: Locri, Italy
- Height: 1.87 m (6 ft 1 1/2 in)
- Position: Defender

Youth career
- 2003–2005: Reggina

Senior career*
Years	Team	Apps	(Gls)
2005–2009	Reggina	1	(0)
2005	→ Novara (loan)	1	(0)
2006	→ Melfi (loan)	8	(0)
2006–2007	→ Taranto (loan)	25	(0)
2007–2008	→ Ravenna (loan)	24	(3)
2009	→ Avellino (loan)	14	(0)
2009–2010	Ancona	36	(1)
2010–2012	Reggina	55	(3)
2012–2015	Pro Vercelli	68	(2)
2013	→ Grosseto (loan)	5	(1)
2015–2019	Lecce	90	(4)
2019–2022	Alessandria	42	(1)
2022–2023	Piacenza	36	(1)
- * Club domestic league appearances and goals as of 22 April 2023

Francesco Cosenza (born 5 February 1986) is an Italian footballer.

== Club career ==
Cosenza started his career at Reggina. He then played for Serie B and Serie C clubs, before making his Serie A debut with Reggina on 1 November 2008 against Inter. He also played twice at Coppa Italia 2008-09, before moving to Avellino on loan in January 2009.

On 11 January 2022, he signed a 1.5-year contract with Piacenza in Serie C.
