= Filippo Perucchini =

Italian footballer

Personal information
- Date of birth: 6 October 1991 (age 35)
- Place of birth: Bergamo, Italy
- Height: 1.91 m (6 ft 3 in)
- Position: Goalkeeper

Team information
- Current team: Team Altamura

Youth career
- Albinoleffe
- 2002–2010: Milan

Senior career*
| Years | Team | Apps | (Gls) |
| 2008–2013 | Milan | 0 | (0) |
| 2010–2011 | → Fano (loan) | 22 | (0) |
| 2011–2012 | → Lecco (loan) | 2 | (0) |
| 2012 | → Chieti (loan) | 1 | (0) |
| 2012–2013 | → Como (loan) | 19 | (0) |
| 2013–2016 | Lecce | 51 | (0) |
| 2014–2015 | → Varese (loan) | 15 | (0) |
| 2016–2018 | Bologna | 0 | (0) |
| 2016–2017 | → Benevento (loan) | 0 | (0) |
| 2017–2018 | → Lecce (loan) | 50 | (0) |
| 2018–2019 | Ascoli | 13 | (0) |
| 2019–2020 | Empoli | 1 | (0) |
| 2020–2021 | Pistoiese | 26 | (0) |
| 2021–2022 | Teramo | 22 | (0) |
| 2022–2024 | Ancona | 65 | (0) |
| 2024–2025 | Legnago | 23 | (0) |
| 2025–2026 | Foggia | 25 | (0) |
| 2026– | Team Altamura | 0 | (0) |

International career
| 2007–2008 | Italy U-17 | 7 | (0) |
- * Club domestic league appearances and goals as of 1 May 2026

Filippo Perucchini (born 6 October 1991) is an Italian professional footballer who plays as a goalkeeper for Serie C Group C club Team Altamura.

== Club career ==
=== Milan ===
Born in Bergamo, Perucchini started playing football with local team Albinoleffe, before joining Milan in 2002. Throughout his time in the club's youth system, he has been a member of both the under-17 squad who won the Campionato Nazionale Allievi in 2007, and the under-20 side who won the Coppa Italia Primavera in 2010, 25 years after their last success. He was called up for some first team games since 2008, but eventually was never fielded.

==== Fano (loan) ====
In order to gain some first team experience, Perucchini was loaned out to Seconda Divisione club Fano for the 2010–11 season. He made his official debut for the club on 1 September 2010, in the fourth game of the Coppa Italia Lega Pro group stage against Celano, which Fano lost 3–1. On 26 September, he also made his league debut, replacing Alessandro Beni in the second half of a home match against San Marino. Perucchini went on to make a total of 14 league appearances for the club.

==== Lecco & Chieti (loan) ====
For the 2011–12 season, Perucchini was sent on loan to Lecco in Seconda Divisione, but he was called back in January after making only two league appearances and joined Chieti, another Seconda Divisione team, on loan for the remainder of the season. However, he still faced lack of playing time, making one single league appearance for his new club.

==== Como (loan) ====
At the beginning of the 2012–13 season, Perucchini transferred to Prima Divisione side Como on loan.

=== Lecce ===
In July 2013, Perucchini was loaned to Lecce whilst Milan sold half his rights in a co-ownership with the club. He signed a contract with Lecce to 2015. After spending a year in Salento he was loaned to Serie B side Varese.

In July 2015 he made his return to Lecce and played 27 Lega Pro matches for the club in the 2015–16 season.

=== Bologna ===
==== Benevento and Lecce (loan) ====
In June 2016 he was signed by Bologna on a free transfer and he was loaned to Benevento, but never played in the Serie B season.

On 30 January 2017, he was loaned to Lecce. In summer 2017, the loan was renewed for another season, which saw Perucchini and his teammates clinch promotion to Serie B.

=== Ascoli ===
In August 2018 he was signed by Ascoli on a permanent basis.

=== Empoli ===
On 26 January 2019, Perucchini joined to Empoli.

=== Pistoiese ===
On 2 September 2020 he became a new Pistoiese player.

=== Teramo ===
On 10 November 2021 he joined Teramo.

=== Ancona ===
On 9 June 2022, Perucchini signed a two-year contract with Ancona.

== International career ==
Perucchini won a total of at least caps with Italy U-17 between 2007 and 2008. He went to Minsk for a youth tournament, and at least played the first game. However no line-up for rest of the three matches.
