= Andrea Arrigoni (footballer) =

Italian footballer (born 1988)

Personal information
- Full name: Andrea Arrigoni Marocco
- Date of birth: 10 August 1988 (age 38)
- Place of birth: Bellano, Italy
- Height: 1.70 m (5 ft 7 in)
- Position: Midfielder

Team information
- Current team: Notaresco
- Number: 6

Youth career
- Polisportiva Mandello
- Atalanta

Senior career*
Years	Team	Apps	(Gls)
2007–2008	Atalanta	0	(0)
2007–2008	→ Sangiovannese (loan)	8	(0)
2008–2009	Mezzocorona	31	(0)
2009–2010	Lecco	25	(2)
2010–2012	Ternana	36	(0)
2012–2013	Tritium	27	(3)
2013–2014	Pavia	29	(0)
2014–2016	Cosenza	68	(5)
2016–2019	Lecce	79	(1)
2019–2022	Teramo	97	(6)
2022–2023	Fidelis Andria	32	(3)
2023–2024	Sambenedettese	32	(4)
2024–	Notaresco	11	(3)

International career
2003	Italy U15	4	(0)
- * Club domestic league appearances and goals as of 10 November 2024

Andrea Arrigoni Marocco (born 10 August 1988) is an Italian footballer who plays as a midfielder for Serie D club Notaresco.

== Career ==
Arrigoni is a youth product of Atalanta. Arrigoni left Atalanta to Sangiovannese in temporary deal on 11 July 2007. From 2008 to 2011 half of his registration rights was farmed to three Lega Pro clubs until June 2011. In June 2011 Atalanta gave up the rights.

On 19 July 2012 he was signed by Tritium. He moved to Pavia in July 2013.

On 15 July 2014 he was signed by Cosenza. On 27 June 2016 Arrigoni was signed by Lecce, effective on 1 July.

On 13 July 2019, he signed a 3-year contract with Teramo.

On 24 August 2022, Arrigoni joined Fidelis Andria.

== Honours ==
- Lega Pro Prima Divisione (Group B): 2012 (Ternana)
