= Matteo Legittimo =

Italian footballer

Personal information
- Date of birth: 17 June 1989 (age 37)
- Place of birth: Casarano, Italy
- Height: 1.84 m (6 ft 1/2 in)
- Position: Defender

Youth career
- Lecce

Senior career*
Years	Team	Apps	(Gls)
2008–2010	Lecce	0	(0)
2008	→ Pistoiese (loan)	7	(0)
2009	→ Paganese (loan)	4	(0)
2009–2010	→ Barletta (loan)	33	(0)
2010–2011	Salernitana	20	(1)
2011–2013	Lecce	13	(0)
2012	→ Südtirol (loan)	17	(0)
2013	→ Ascoli (loan)	7	(0)
2013–2015	Parma	0	(0)
2013–2014	→ Grosseto (loan)	30	(1)
2014–2015	→ SPAL (loan)	16	(0)
2015	→ Grosseto (loan)	20	(0)
2015–2016	Lecce	32	(0)
2016–2018	Trapani	39	(1)
2018	Lecce	14	(0)
2018–2021	Cosenza	97	(0)
2021–2022	Fidelis Andria	11	(0)
2022–2023	Potenza	13	(0)
2024–2025	Casarano	31	(3)
2025	Virtus	0	(0)

International career^{‡}
2005	Italy U-16	1	(0)
2006	Italy U-18	2	(0)
2007–2008	Italy U-19	2	(0)
2008	Italy U-20	1	(0)
- * Club domestic league appearances and goals as of 28 August 2025 ‡ National team caps and goals as of 19 November 2008

Matteo Legittimo (born 17 June 1989) is an Italian football player who plays as a defender.

== Club career ==
He made his professional debut in the Lega Pro for Salernitana on 22 August 2010 in a game against Sorrento. On 16 January 2018, he left Trapani for Lecce, when he was exchanged for Mirko Drudi.

On 26 November 2021, he signed with Fidelis Andria in Serie C.

== Honours ==
Lecce

- Serie C: 2017–18 (Group C)
