= Salvatore Caturano =

Italian professional football player

Personal information
- Date of birth: 3 July 1990 (age 36)
- Place of birth: Naples, Italy
- Height: 1.85 m (6 ft 1 in)
- Position: Striker

Team information
- Current team: Catania
- Number: 9

Senior career*
Years	Team	Apps	(Gls)
2006–2013	Empoli	2	(0)
2008–2009	→ Taranto (loan)	28	(5)
2010	→ Viareggio (loan)	12	(2)
2010	→ Ravenna (loan)	17	(3)
2011	→ Andria BAT (loan)	3	(0)
2011	→ Nocerina (loan)	3	(0)
2012	→ Foligno (loan)	16	(3)
2012–2013	→ Paganese (loan)	21	(6)
2013–2014	Casertana	14	(3)
2014	→ ACR Messina (loan)	11	(1)
2014–2015	Melfi	36	(18)
2015–2017	Bari	0	(0)
2015	→ Ascoli (loan)	9	(1)
2016–2017	→ Lecce (loan)	50	(21)
2017–2019	Lecce	30	(8)
2018–2019	→ Virtus Entella (loan)	34	(8)
2019–2020	Virtus Entella	1	(0)
2020–2022	Cesena	46	(13)
2022–2025	Potenza	101	(46)
2025–	Catania	26	(3)

International career
2006	Italy U-16	13	(6)
2006–2007	Italy U-17	9	(4)
2009	Italy U-20	1	(1)
- * Club domestic league appearances and goals as of 1 May 2026

Salvatore Caturano (born 3 July 1990) is an Italian professional footballer who plays as a striker for Serie C Group C club Catania.

== Club career ==
=== Empoli ===
He made his debut in the Serie A on 13 May 2007 for Empoli in a game against Siena when he came on as a substitute for Davide Matteini in the 80th minute at the age of 16 years, 10 months and 10 days.

==== Loan to Taranto ====
After had made his Serie B debut in a 2–2 home draw against Brescia, on 1 September 2008 he was loaned to Serie C side Taranto on a season-long loan deal. On 14 September he made his Serie C debut for Taranto as a substitute replacing Davide Dionigi in the 63rd minute of a 1–1 home draw against Benevento. On 21 September, Caturano played his first match as a starter and he scored his first professional goal in the 8th minute of a 1–0 away win over ASD Progreditur Marcianise, he was replaced by Tommaso Marolda in the 70th minute, one week later he played his first entire match, a 2–0 away defeat against Arezzo. On 16 November, Caturano scored his second goal, as a substitute, in the 90th minute of a 3–0 home win over Virtus Lanciano. On 18 January 2009 he scored twice in a 3–0 home win over Città di Foligno. Caturano ended his loan to Taranto with 28 appearances and 5 goals.

==== Loan to Viareggio ====
After had make only 1 appearance for Empoli in the first part of the season in Coppa Italia, on 1 January 2010, Caturano was signed by Serie C club Viareggio on a 6-month loan deal. On 24 January he made his debut for Viareggio as a substitute replacing Mirko Guadalupi in the 86th minute of a 1–1 away draw against Como. On 31 January, Caturano played his first match as a starter for Viareggio, a 0–0 home draw against Monza, he was replaced by Umberto Eusepi in the 65th minute. On 2 May he scored twice in a 2–2 away draw against Sorrento, one week later he played his first entire match for Viareggio, a 2–2 home draw against Benevento. On 23 May he scored his third goal in the 79th minute of a 1–1 away draw against Paganese in the Serie C play-out. Caturano ended his 6-month loan to Viareggio with 12 appearances and 2 goals.

==== Loan to Ravenna and Andria BAT ====
On 1 August 2010, Caturano was loaned to Serie C side Ravenna on a 6-month loan deal. On 22 August, Caturano made his Serie C debut as a starter in a 2–1 away win over Como, he was replaced by Luca Gerbino Polo in the 56th minute. On 29 August he played his first entire match for Ravenna and he scored his first goal in the 36th minute of a 1–1 home draw against Bassano Virtus. On 19 September he scored his second goal in the 2nd minute of a 3–2 away defeat against Sorrento. On 14 November he scored his third goal in the 16th minute of a 2–1 home win over Lumezzane. Caturano ended his loan to Ravenna with 17 appearances, 15 as a starter, and 3 goals.

On 1 January 2011, Caturano was signed by Serie C side Andria BAT on a 6-month loan deal. On 23 January he made his Serie C debut for Andria BAT as a substitute replacing Giuseppe Lacarra in the 78th minute of a 1–1 away draw against Lucchese. On 13 March he played his first match as a starter, a 1–0 home defeat against Foggia, he was replaced by Giuseppe Cozzolino in the 55th minute. On 20 March he played his first entire match for Andria BAT, a 3–1 away defeat against Juve Stabia. Caturano ended his loan with only 3 appearances.

==== Loan to Nocerina and Foligno ====
On 1 July 2011, Caturano was signed by Serie B club Nocerina on a 6-month loan deal. On 14 August he made his debut for Nocerina as a substitute replacing Diego Farias in the 64th minute of a 2–0 home win over Foggia in the second round of Coppa Italia. On 24 September he made his Serie B debut as a substitute replacing Alessandro Bruno in the 82nd minute of a 2–1 home defeat against Torino. On 29 October he played his second match for Nocerina, again as a substitute, a 4–2 home win over Sampdoria. On 1 November, Caturato played his first match as a starter, a 2–0 away defeat against Empoli, he was replaced by Emanuele Catania in the 46th minute. Caturato ended his loan to Nocerina with 4 appearances and 1 assist.

On 1 January 2012, Caturano was loaned to Serie C club Foligno on a 6-month loan deal. On 15 January he made his Serie C debut for Foligno playing the entire match and scoring his first goal for the club in the 85th minute of a 2–2 away draw against Como. On 5 February he scored his second goal in the 11th minute of a 1–1 home draw against Reggiana. On 4 April he scored his third goal in the 37th minute of a 1–1 home draw against Viareggio. Caturato ended his 6-month loan to Foligno with 16 appearances and 3 goals.

==== Loan to Paganese ====
On 1 July 2012, Caturato was signed by Serie C club Paganese on a season-long loan deal. On 5 August he made his debut for Paganese as a substitute replacing Luca Orlando in the 62nd minute of a 1–0 away defeat against Nocerina in the first round of Coppa Italia. On 23 September he made his Serie C debut for Paganese as a substitute replacing Luca Orlando in the 71st minute of a 0–0 home draw against Catanzaro. On 9 December, Caturato played his first match as a starter and he scored his first goal for the club in the 34th minute of a 2–2 away draw against Frosinone, he was replaced by Dino Fava in the 74th minute. On 28 March he scored his second goal in the 30th minute of a 1–1 home draw against Latina. On 21 January he played his first entire match for Paganese and he scored twice in a 4–1 home win over Avellino. Caturano ended his season-long loan to Paganese with 21 appearances and 6 goals.

=== Virtus Entella ===
On 16 August 2018, he joined Virtus Entella on loan from Lecce. Virtus Entella held an option to purchase him at the end of the loan, that option could turn into an obligation if certain conditions were met. He joined the club permanently on a 3-year contract at the end of the season.

=== Cesena ===
On 22 January 2020, he signed with Serie C club Cesena until the end of the 2019–20 season.

=== Potenza ===
On 6 August 2022, Caturano moved to Potenza on a two-year contract.

== Career statistics ==
=== Club ===
As of match played 28 November 2021

Club	Season	League			National cup		League cup		Other		Total	
Club	Season	League	Apps	Goals	Apps	Goals	Apps	Goals	Apps	Goals	Apps	Goals
Empoli	2006–07	Serie A	1	0	0	0	—		—		1	0
Empoli	2007–08	Serie A	0	0	0	0	—		—		0	0
Empoli	2008–09	Serie B	1	0	0	0	—		—		1	0
Empoli	Total		2	0	0	0	—		—		2	0
Taranto (loan)	2008–09	Serie C	28	5	0	0	—		—		28	5
Empoli	2009–10	Serie B	0	0	1	0	—		—		1	0
Viareggio (loan)	2009–10	Serie C	12	2	0	0	—		2 (Note: Appearance(s) in Relegation Playoffs)	1	14	3
Ravenna (loan)	2010–11	Serie C	17	3	0	0	—		—		17	3
Andria BAT (loan)	2010–11	Serie C	3	0	—		—		—		3	0
Nocerina (loan)	2011–12	Serie B	3	0	1	0	—		—		4	0
Foligno (loan)	2011–12	Serie C	16	3	—		—		—		16	3
Paganese (loan)	2012–13	Serie C	21	6	1	0	—		—		22	6
Casertana	2013–14	Serie C	14	3	1	0	2	0	—		17	3
ACR Messina (loan)	2013–14	Serie C	11	1	—		—		1 (Note: Appearance(s) in Supercoppa di Serie C)	0	12	1
Melfi	2014–15	Serie C	36	18	0	0	—		—		36	18
Ascoli (loan)	2015–16	Serie B	9	1	0	0	—		—		9	1
Lecce (loan)	2015–16	Serie C	14	4	—		—		3 (Note: Appearance(s) in Promotion Playoffs)	2	17	6
Lecce (loan)	2016–17	Serie C	36	17	3	1	—		4	1	43	19
Lecce	2017–18	Serie C	30	8	3	1	1	0	1	0	35	9
Lecce	2018–19	Serie C	0	0	0	0	—		—		0	0
Lecce	Total		80	29	6	2	1	0	8	3	95	34
Virtus Entella (loan)	2018–19	Serie C	34	8	1	0	—		1	0	36	8
Virtus Entella	2019–20	Serie B	1	0	0	0	—		—		1	0
Virtus Entella	Total		35	8	1	0	—		1	0	37	8
Cesena	2019–20	Serie C	5	3	0	0	—		—		5	3
Cesena	2020–21	Serie C	14	3	0	0	—		2	1	16	4
Cesena	2021–22	Serie C	16	5	0	0	1	1	—		17	6
Cesena	Total		35	11	0	0	1	1	2	1	38	13
Career total			322	90	11	2	4	1	14	5	351	98

== Honours ==
=== Club ===
Lecce

- Serie C: 2017–18

Virtus Entella

- Serie C: 2018-19
