= Giuseppe Torromino =

Italian footballer

Personal information
- Date of birth: 21 June 1988 (age 38)
- Place of birth: Crotone, Italy
- Height: 1.76 m (5 ft 9 in)
- Positions: Forward; winger

Team information
- Current team: PDHAE

Senior career*
Years	Team	Apps	(Gls)
2005–2006	Biellese	15	(2)
2006–2007	Torino	0	(0)
2007–2009	Biellese	49	(11)
2009–2010	Carrarese	13	(0)
2010–2012	Treviso	61	(16)
2012–2016	Crotone	49	(12)
2014	→ Entella (loan)	16	(3)
2014–2015	→ Grosseto (loan)	35	(15)
2016–2018	Lecce	63	(15)
2019	Juve Stabia	17	(0)
2019–2021	Ternana	39	(1)
2021–2022	Livorno	6	(1)
2022–2023	Sambenedettese	11	(1)
2023–	PDHAE	0	(0)
- * Club domestic league appearances and goals as of 24 September 2023

Giuseppe Torromino (born 21 June 1988) is an Italian professional footballer who plays for Serie D club PDHAE as a forward or winger.

== Club career ==
After playing in the lower leagues (impressing with Treviso in 2011–12), Torromino joined Serie B side Crotone on 13 July 2012 on a three-year contract.

On 9 September 2012 he made his league debut, coming on as a substitute in a 3–1 home success over Cittadella.

In January 2014 he was signed by Entella. On 28 August 2014 he left for Grosseto. The player returned to Crotone after his subsequent loan spell with Grosseto had expired, and shortly after departed his hometown club for Lecce in August 2016. He gained promotion to Serie B with the giallorossi side in 2017-2018, scoring 5 goals in the league.

On 17 January 2019 he moved to Juve Stabia on a permanent basis.

On 23 August 2019, he signed a 2-year contract with Ternana.

On 29 September 2021, he joined newly reformed Livorno in the amateur levels.
