= Pedro Ferreira (footballer, born 1991) =

Portuguese footballer

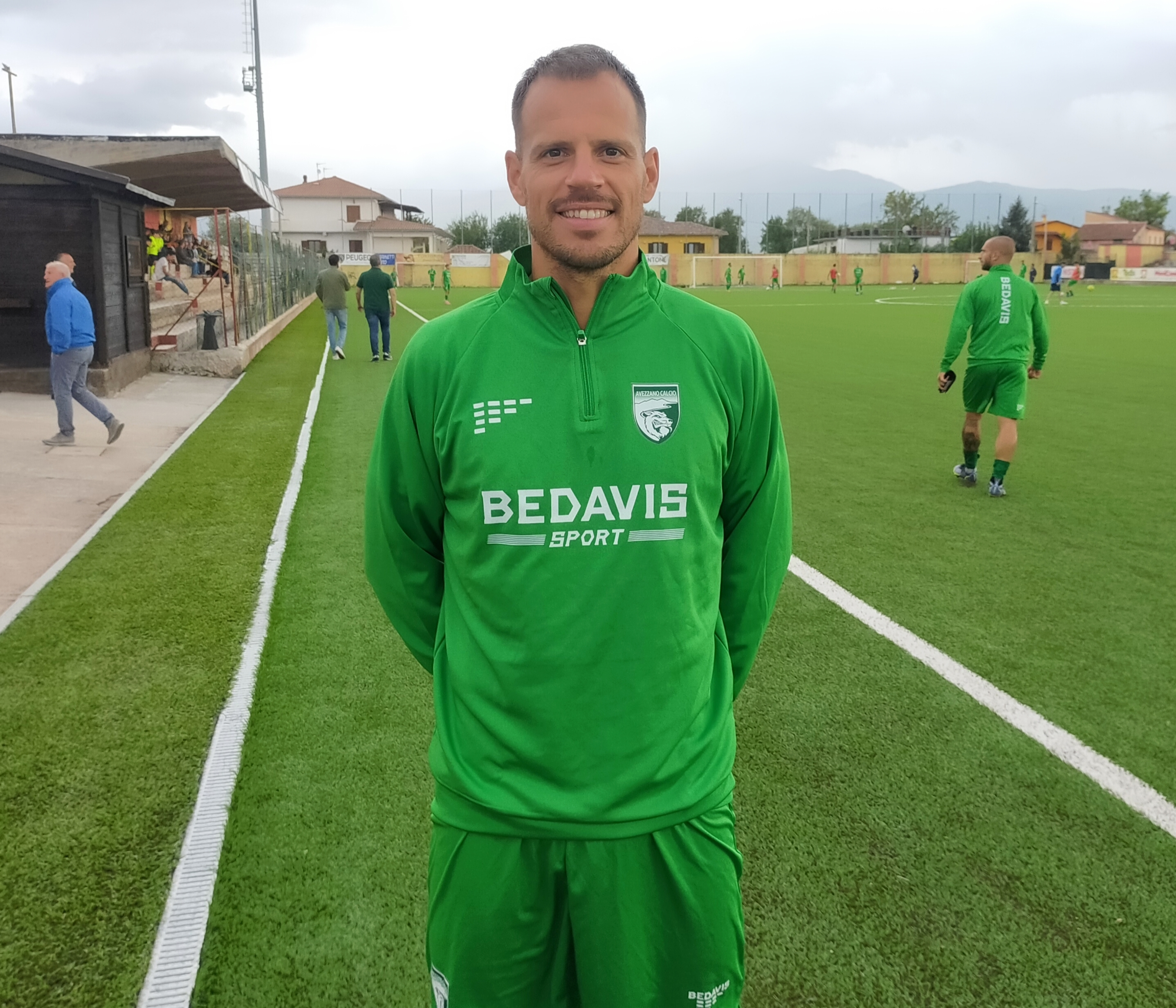

Personal information
- Full name: Pedro Miguel Costa Ferreira
- Date of birth: 1 January 1991 (age 35)
- Place of birth: Barcelos, Portugal
- Height: 1.81 m (5 ft 11 1/2 in)
- Position: Winger

Team information
- Current team: L'Aquila

Youth career
- 2001–2005: Barroselas
- 2003–2005: Gil Vicente
- 2006–2007: Inter Milan
- 2007–2008: Sassuolo

Senior career*
Years	Team	Apps	(Gls)
2008–2009	Carpi	32	(8)
2009–2010	Sassuolo	0	(0)
2010–2011	Teramo	28	(4)
2011–2012	Ancona	32	(2)
2012–2014	Messina	49	(21)
2014–2016	Virtus Entella	77	(6)
2017–2019	Lecce	41	(3)
2018–2019	→ Trapani (loan)	37	(0)
2019–2021	Teramo	58	(8)
2021–2023	Potenza	20	(3)
2023	Fidelis Andria	12	(1)
2023	Avezzano	10	(0)
2023–	L'Aquila	1	(0)
- * Club domestic league appearances and goals as of 20 December 2023

Pedro Miguel Costa Ferreira (born 1 January 1991) is a Portuguese footballer who plays as a winger for Italian Serie D club L'Aquila.

== Club career ==
On 2 September 2019, Ferreira returned to Teramo, signing a two-year contract.

On 9 February 2023, Ferreira signed with Fidelis Andria. In August 2023 he plays with Avezzano Calcio (Serie D).
