= AS Melfi =

Italian football club

- Full name: Associazione Sportiva Melfi SRL
- Founded: 1929
- Ground: Stadio Arturo Valerio, Melfi, Italy
- Capacity: 3,000
- Chairman: Corrado Del Giudice
- Manager: Alessandro Potenza
- League: Serie D
Home colours	Away colours

Associazione Sportiva Melfi is an Italian association football club, based in Melfi, Basilicata. The club currently play in Serie D.

== History ==
The club was founded in 1929.

Melfi has always played in amateur leagues, before being promoted to Serie C2 for the first time in 2003.

In the 2012–13 season, the club enjoyed its eleventh consecutive season in the fourth tier of Italian football, Lega Pro Seconda Divisione. The team had a decent season, finishing eighth out of 18 teams. In the 2013–14 season they won a historic promotion to the 2014–15 Lega Pro, the third tier, due to the merger of the two divisions of Lega Pro, as well as a reduction of the whole league from 69 teams to 60.

== Colours and badge ==
The team's colours are yellow and green.

== Stadium ==
The home ground of Melfi is the "Stadio Arturo Valerio" which has a capacity of 3,000 persons.

== Honours ==
- 1 Coppa Italia Regionale: 1992
- 1 promotion in Serie C2: 2003
- 4° better placing in Serie C2: 2006
