= Franco Lepore =

Italian footballer

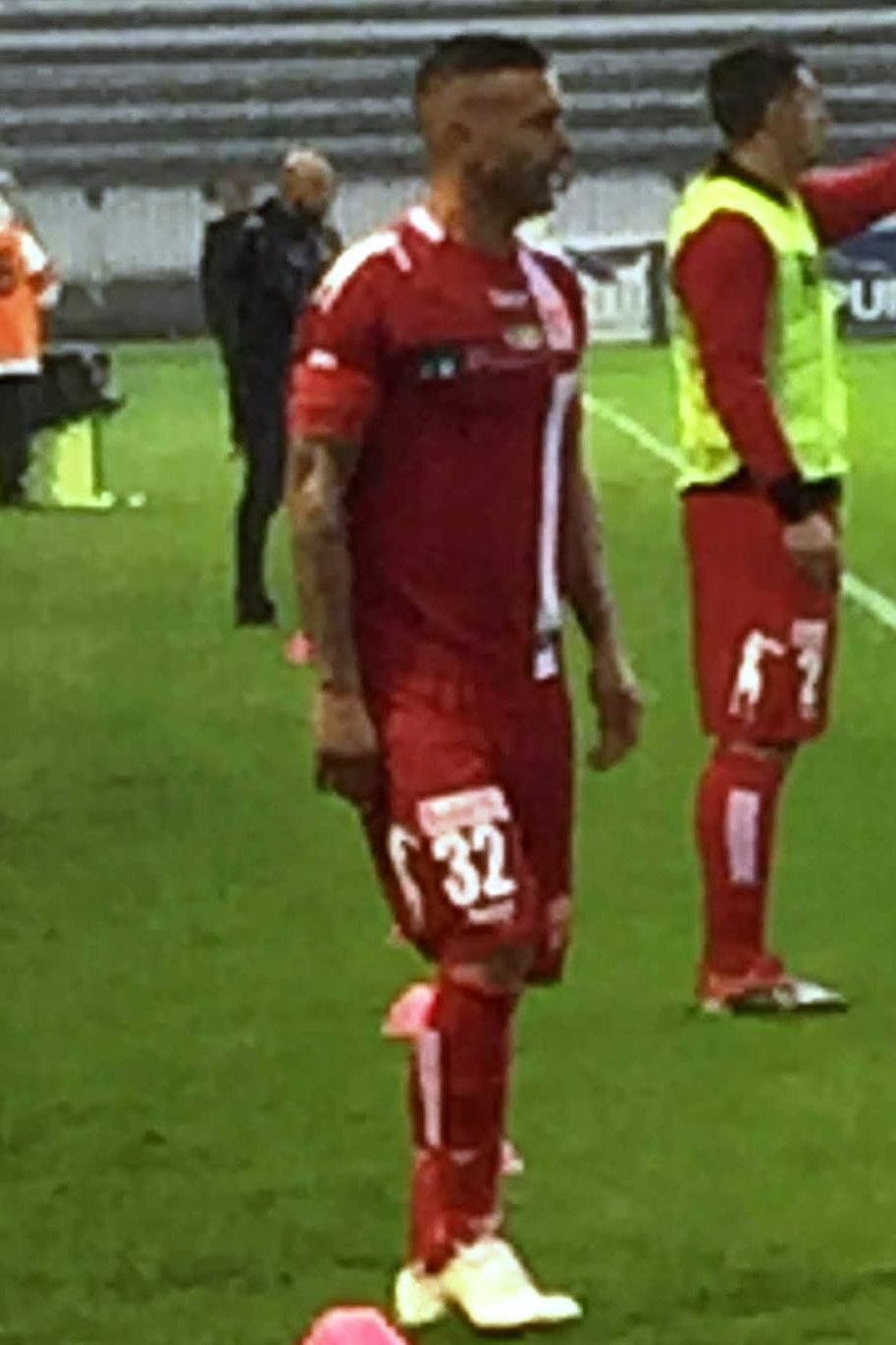
- Lepore for Monza in 2019

Personal information
- Date of birth: 16 August 1985 (age 41)
- Place of birth: Lecce, Italy
- Height: 1.78 m (5 ft 10 in)
- Position: Right-back

Youth career
- Lecce

Senior career*
Years	Team	Apps	(Gls)
2004–2005	Virtus Castelfranco	28	(3)
2005–2009	Varese	95	(19)
2009–2010	Lecce	15	(1)
2010–2011	Rodengo Saiano	10	(0)
2011	Paganese	15	(0)
2011–2012	Varese	6	(0)
2013	Real Vicenza	21	(13)
2013–2014	Nocerina	20	(5)
2014–2019	Lecce	134	(18)
2019–2021	Monza	45	(3)
2021	Triestina	13	(2)
2021–2022	Pergolettese	19	(1)
2022–2025	Lecco	81	(7)
2025–2026	Team Altamura	18	(0)
2026	Folgore Caratese	13	(1)
- * Club domestic league appearances and goals as of 25 June 2026

Franco Lepore (born 16 August 1985) is an Italian professional footballer who plays as a right-back.

== Career ==
Lepore joined Serie C side Monza in January 2019, helping them gain promotion to the Serie B for the first time in 19 years. On 1 February 2021, Lepore joined Triestina in the Serie C.

On 3 November 2021, he signed with Pergolettese.

On 5 August 2022, Lepore moved to Lecco. He heavily contributed to Lecco's promotion to Serie B at the end of the 2022–23 season, scoring 3 goals in the final leg of promotion play-offs against Foggia.

== Honours ==
Lecce

- Serie B: 2009–10

Monza

- Serie C Group A: 2019–20
