= ACD Nardò =

Italian football club

Nardò
- Full name: Associazione Calcio Dilettantistica Nardò
- Nickname: Toro (Bull)
- Founded: 1925; 2014 (refounded)
- Ground: Stadio Giovanni Paolo II, Nardò, Italy
- Capacity: 5,000
- Chairman: Marco Calavera
- Manager: Nicola Ragno
- League: Serie D/H
- 2022–23: 3rd
| Home colours | Away colours |

A.C.D. Nardò (usually referred to as simply Nardò) is an Italian association football club, based in Nardò, Apulia. It currently plays in Serie D.

== History ==
The club was founded in 1925 as U.S. Neritina.

=== Serie C ===
It has quite a past, with three seasons in the Italian Serie C, the former 3rd level of Italian football, between the 60s and the 70s and having won 3 Coppe Italia Regionali and 1 Coppa Italia di Serie D.

From the 1998–99 to the 2001–02 season it has played in Serie C2.

=== Radiation and refoundation ===
On 6 November 2013 after renouncing to play four games in Serie D Nardò was removed by LND.

Before the 2014–15 season the club bought the sporting rights of ASD Copertino (from Copertino), establishing ACD Nardò. It was subsequently admitted to Eccellenza Pugliese.

== Colors and badge ==
The official color of the team is amaranth.
