= 2016–17 Coppa Italia =

TIM Cup
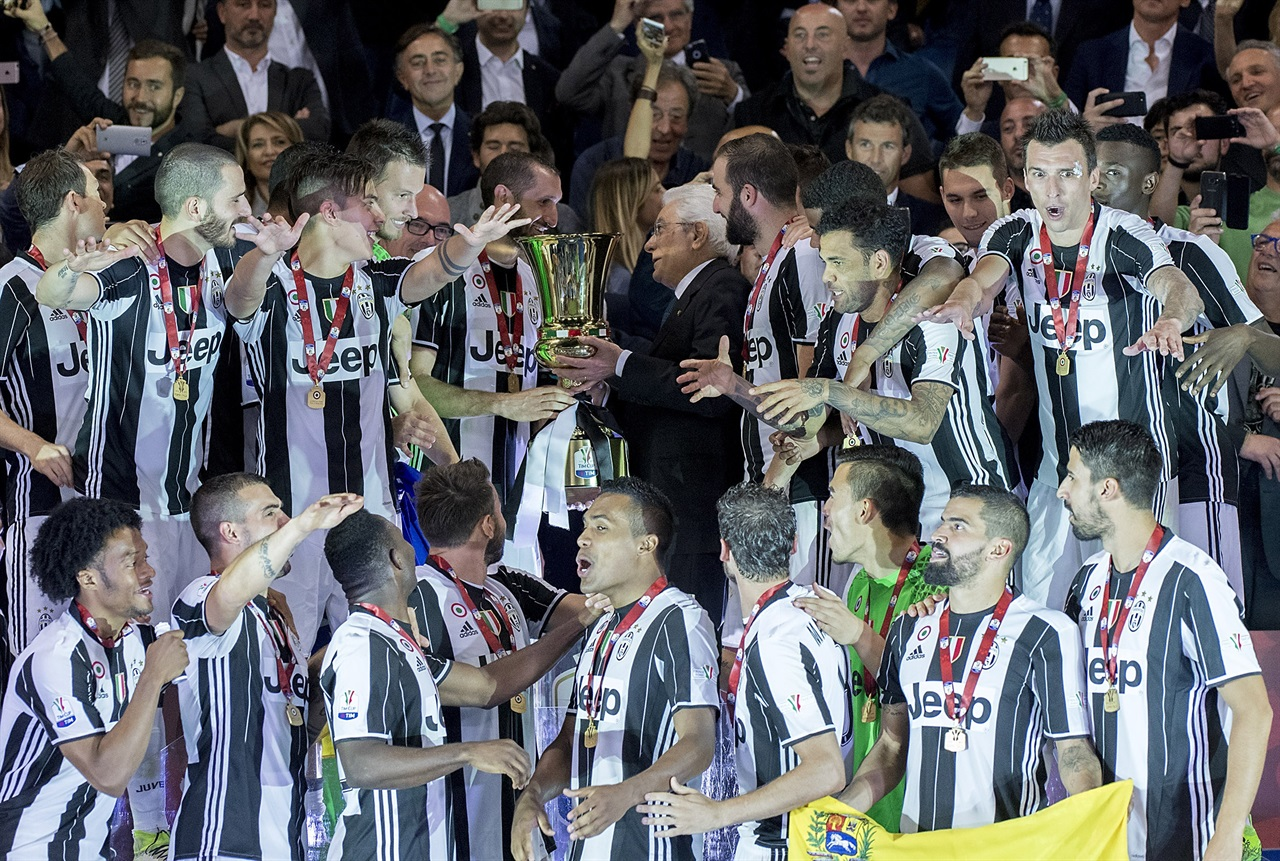
- Juventus captain Giorgio Chiellini receives the 2017 Coppa Italia from the President of Italy Sergio Mattarella

Tournament details
- Country: Italy
- Dates: 29 July 2016 – 17 May 2017
- Teams: 78

Final positions
- Champions: Juventus (12th title)
- Runners-up: Lazio

Tournament statistics
- Matches played: 79
- Goals scored: 252 (3.19 per match)
- Top goal scorer(s): Marco Borriello; Paulo Dybala; Goran Pandev (4 goals each)

The 2016–17 Coppa Italia, also known as TIM Cup for sponsorship reasons, was the 70th edition of the domestic national tournament. Juventus successfully defended its title by defeating Lazio 2–0 in the final, becoming the first team to win the title for three consecutive years and for a record-extending 12th title.

== Participating teams ==
=== Serie A (20 teams) ===
- Atalanta
- Bologna
- Cagliari
- Chievo
- Crotone
- Empoli
- Fiorentina
- Genoa
- Internazionale
- Juventus
- Lazio
- Milan
- Napoli
- Palermo
- Pescara
- Roma
- Sampdoria
- Sassuolo
- Torino
- Udinese

=== Serie B (22 teams) ===
- Ascoli
- Avellino
- Bari
- Benevento
- Brescia
- Carpi
- Cesena
- Cittadella
- Frosinone
- Latina
- Novara
- Perugia
- Pisa
- Pro Vercelli
- Salernitana
- SPAL
- Spezia
- Ternana
- Trapani
- Hellas Verona
- Vicenza
- Virtus Entella

=== Lega Pro (27 teams) ===
- Alessandria
- Ancona
- Arezzo
- Bassano Virtus
- Carrarese
- Casertana
- Como
- Cosenza
- Cremonese
- FeralpiSalò
- Fidelis Andria
- Foggia
- Juve Stabia
- Lecce
- Livorno
- Maceratese
- Matera
- Messina
- Modena
- Padova
- Pontedera
- Pordenone
- Reggiana
- Siena
- Südtirol
- Teramo
- Tuttocuoio

=== Serie D (9 teams) ===
- Altovicentino
- Campodarsego
- Caronnese
- Fermana
- Francavilla
- Frattese
- Grosseto
- Montecatini
- Seregno

source: legaseriea.it

== Format and seeding ==
Teams entered the competition at various stages, as follows:

- First phase (one-legged fixtures)
  - First round: 36 teams from Lega Pro and Serie D started the tournament
  - Second round: the eighteen winners from the previous round were joined by the 22 Serie B teams
  - Third round: the twenty winners from the second round met the twelve Serie A sides seeded 9–20
  - Fourth round: the sixteen winners faced each other
- Second phase
  - Round of 16 (one-legged): the eight fourth round winners were inserted into a bracket with the Serie A clubs seeded 1–8
  - Quarter-finals (one-legged)
  - Semi-finals (two-legged)
- Final (one-legged)

== Round dates ==
The schedule of each round was as follows:

Phase	Round	First leg	Second leg
First stage	First round	29–31 July 2016	
First stage	Second round	5–8 August 2016	
First stage	Third round	12–15 August 2016	
First stage	Fourth round	29 November – 1 December 2016	
Final stage	Round of 16	11 & 18 January 2017	
Final stage	Quarter-finals	25 January & 1 February 2017	
Final stage	Semi-finals	1 March 2017	5 April 2017
Final stage	Final	17 May 2017	

== First stage ==
=== First round ===
A total of 36 teams from Lega Pro and Serie D competed in this round, eighteen of which advanced to second round. The matches were played between 29 and 31 July 2016.

29 July 2016	Livorno (3)	1–3	Juve Stabia (3)	Livorno
21:00 CEST (UTC+2)	Cellini 26' (pen.)	Report	Liotti 20'; Del Sante 22', 56'	Stadium: Armando Picchi; Attendance: 2,031; Referee: Fabio Piscopo

30 July 2016	Campodarsego (4)	3–3 (a.e.t.) (3–4 p)	Maceratese (3)	Campodarsego
18:00 CEST (UTC+2)	Lauria 4'; Meloni 85', 108'	Report	Colombi 14'; Turchetta 73', 104'	Stadium: Centro Sportivo Il Gabbiano; Attendance: 500; Referee: Giampaolo Mantelli
	Penalties
	Meloni (penalty scored); Beccaro (penalty scored); Aliù (penalty missed); Pignat (penalty scored); Radrezza (penalty missed)		(penalty scored) Turchetta; (penalty scored) Quadri; (penalty missed) Kouko; (penalty scored) Gattari; (penalty scored) Malaccari

30 July 2016	Lecce (3)	2–1	Altovicentino (4)	Lecce
21:00 CEST (UTC+2)	Vutov 13'; Mancosu 83'	Report	Trinchieri 88'	Stadium: Via del Mare; Attendance: 3,299; Referee: Giuseppe Strippoli

31 July 2016	Casertana (3)	3–2 (a.e.t.)	Tuttocuoio (3)	Caserta
15:00 CEST (UTC+2)	Giorno 90', pen.' De Marco 106'; Kušeta 114'	Report	Pellini 27'; Tempesti 94'	Stadium: Alberto Pinto; Attendance: 500; Referee: Vincenzo Fiorini

31 July 2016	Alessandria (3)	2–1	Teramo (3)	Alessandria
17:00 CEST (UTC+2)	Iocolano 40'; Bocalon 62'	Report	Carraro 42'	Stadium: Giuseppe Moccagatta; Attendance: 2,212; Referee: Pierantonio Perotti

31 July 2016	Como (3)	3–0	Montecatini (4)	Pavia
17:30 CEST (UTC+2)	Di Quinzio 38'; Chinellato 74'; Le Noci 76' (pen.)	Report		Stadium: Pietro Fortunati; Attendance: 500; Referee: Francesco Guccini

31 July 2016	Carrarese (3)	1–2 (a.e.t.)	Arezzo (3)	Carrara
18:00 CEST (UTC+2)	Tutino 88'	Report	Sirri 5', 97'	Stadium: Stadio dei Marmi; Attendance: 841; Referee: Lorenzo Bertani

31 July 2016	Modena (3)	2–0	Francavilla (4)	Modena
18:00 CEST (UTC+2)	Tulissi 26'; Diakité 49'	Report		Stadium: Alberto Braglia; Attendance: 1,547; Referee: Emanuele Mancini

31 July 2016	Padova (3)	0–0 (a.e.t.) (3–4 p)	Seregno (4)	Padova
18:00 CEST (UTC+2)		Report		Stadium: Stadio Euganeo; Attendance: 1,502; Referee: Alessandro Pietropaolo
	Penalties
	Ilari (penalty scored); Mandorlini (penalty missed); Madonna (penalty scored); Filipe (penalty missed); Emerson (penalty scored)		(penalty scored) Székely; (penalty scored) Valente; (penalty missed) Cusaro; (penalty scored) Lillo; (penalty scored) Jeda

31 July 2016	FeralpiSalò (3)	2–3 (a.e.t.)	Reggiana (3)	Salò
18:00 CEST (UTC+2)	Bracaletti 38' (pen.); Romero 89'		Marchi 36' (pen.); Nolè 77'; Guidone 100'	Stadium: Lino Turina; Attendance: 1,000; Referee: Daniel Amabile

31 July 2016	Ancona (3)	4–3	Südtirol (3)	Ancona
18:30 CEST (UTC+2)	Cognigni 21' (pen.), 58', 83'; Forgács 65'	Report	Bassoli 45+1'; Gliozzi 48'; Fink 68'	Stadium: Stadio del Conero; Attendance: 1,200; Referee: Daniele Paterna

31 July 2016	Bassano Virtus (3)	1–1 (a.e.t.) (5–3 p)	Fidelis Andria (3)	Bassano del Grappa
20:00 CEST (UTC+2)	Maistrello 70'	Report	Piccinni 26'	Stadium: Rino Mercante; Attendance: 700; Referee: Andrea Zingarelli
	Penalties
	Cavagna (penalty scored); Rantier (penalty scored); Laurenti (penalty scored); Fabbro (penalty scored); Candido (penalty scored)		(penalty scored) Matera; (penalty scored) Tartaglia; (penalty missed) Cianci; (penalty scored) Piccinni

31 July 2016	Cosenza (3)	1–0	Frattese (4)	Cosenza
20:30 CEST (UTC+2)	Cavallaro 8'	Report		Stadium: San Vito; Attendance: 1,362; Referee: Vito Mastrodonato

31 July 2016	Cremonese (3)	4–3	Fermana (4)	Cremona
20:30 CEST (UTC+2)	Porcari 23', 76'; Scappini 39'; Brighenti 83'	Report	Urbinati 2'; Molinari 57'; Forò 72'	Stadium: Giovanni Zini; Attendance: 1,789; Referee: Alessandro Prontera

31 July 2016	Foggia (3)	3–1	Pontedera (3)	Foggia
20:30 CEST (UTC+2)	Chiricò 10'; Viola 83', 88'	Report	Santini 38'	Stadium: Pino Zaccheria; Attendance: 6,000; Referee: Riccardo Panarese

31 July 2016	Matera (3)	3–0 (Awarded)	Caronnese (4)	Matera
20:30 CEST (UTC+2)	Papini 83'; Casoli 84'	Report	Mair 56'	Stadium: Stadio XXI Settembre; Attendance: 2,500; Referee: Vincenzo Valiante

31 July 2016	Pordenone (3)	5–2	Grosseto (4)	Pordenone
20:30 CEST (UTC+2)	Berrettoni 9', 26'; Arma 15', 38' (pen.); Stefani 90+1'		Falconieri 50', 55' (pen.)	Stadium: Ottavio Bottecchia; Attendance: 1,000; Referee: Andrea Zanonato

31 July 2016	Siena (3)	0–3	Messina (3)	Siena
21:00 CEST (UTC+2)		Report	Pozzebon 11'; Ciccone 28', 56'	Stadium: Artemio Franchi; Attendance: 1,100; Referee: Edoardo Paolini

=== Second round ===
A total of forty teams from Serie B and Lega Pro competed in the second round, twenty of which advanced to join twelve teams from Serie A in the third round. The matches were played from 5 to 8 August 2016.

5 August 2016	Hellas Verona (2)	2–1	Foggia (3)	Verona
21:00 CEST (UTC+2)	Luppi 39'; Ganz 78'	Report	Letizia 19'	Stadium: Marcantonio Bentegodi; Attendance: 5,972; Referee: Gianluca Aureliano

6 August 2016	Carpi (2)	3–2	Maceratese (3)	Modena
17:30 CEST (UTC+2)	Catellani 11' (pen.), 47'; Marchetti 37' (o.g.)	Report	Palmieri 88'; Quadri 90+5' (pen.)	Stadium: Alberto Braglia; Attendance: 737; Referee: Marco Piccinini

6 August 2016	Spezia (2)	1–0	Modena (3)	La Spezia
20:30 CEST (UTC+2)	Iemmello 59'	Report		Stadium: Alberto Picco; Attendance: 3,540; Referee: Gianluca Manganiello

7 August 2016	SPAL (2)	2–0	Messina (3)	Forlì
18:30 CEST (UTC+2)	Antenucci 21'; Cerri 63'	Report		Stadium: Tullo Morgagni; Attendance: 1,036; Referee: Lorenzo Illuzzi

7 August 2016	Vicenza (2)	4–2	Casertana (3)	Vicenza
18:30 CEST (UTC+2)	Raičević 17'; Di Piazza 33'; Lorenzini 38' (o.g.); Galano 90+4'	Report	Giorno 54' (pen.); Lorenzini 68'	Stadium: Romeo Menti; Attendance: 1,736; Referee: Marco Mainardi

7 August 2016	Bassano Virtus (3)	2–0	Avellino (2)	Bassano del Grappa
20:00 CEST (UTC+2)	Maistrello 22'; Rantier 54'	Report		Stadium: Rino Mercante; Attendance: 1,000; Referee: Riccardo Ros

7 August 2016	Cittadella (2)	1–2 (a.e.t.)	Cremonese (3)	Cittadella
20:00 CEST (UTC+2)	Lora 15'	Report	Scappini 90+1'; Brighenti 106'	Stadium: Pier Cesare Tombolato; Attendance: 924; Referee: Valerio Marini

7 August 2016	Bari (2)	1–0	Cosenza (3)	Bari
20:30 CEST (UTC+2)	Monachello 49'	Report		Stadium: San Nicola; Attendance: 11,664; Referee: Antonio Di Martino

7 August 2016	Virtus Entella (2)	2–0	Ancona (3)	Chiavari
20:30 CEST (UTC+2)	Troiano 25' (pen.); Gerli 87'	Report		Stadium: Comunale; Attendance: 1,128; Referee: Riccardo Pinzani

7 August 2016	Novara (2)	2–1	Juve Stabia (3)	Novara
20:30 CEST (UTC+2)	Corazza 49'; Galabinov 60'	Report	Del Sante 11'	Stadium: Silvio Piola; Attendance: 2,294; Referee: Andrea Rapuano

7 August 2016	Pro Vercelli (2)	3–1	Reggiana (3)	Vercelli
20:30 CEST (UTC+2)	Ardizzone 56'; Morra 85'; Mustacchio 90+2'	Report	Nolè 24'	Stadium: Silvio Piola; Attendance: 1,650; Referee: Davide Ghersini

7 August 2016	Brescia (2)	0–2	Pisa (2)	Brescia
20:30 CEST (UTC+2)		Report	Mannini 18'; Verna 65'	Stadium: Mario Rigamonti; Attendance: 6,187; Referee: Marco Serra

7 August 2016	Benevento (2)	0–0 (a.e.t.) (2–4 p)	Salernitana (2)	Benevento
20:30 CEST (UTC+2)				Stadium: Ciro Vigorito; Attendance: 6,855; Referee: Aleandro Di Paolo
	Penalties
	Mazzeo (penalty scored); Lucioni (penalty scored); Ceravolo (penalty missed); De Falco (penalty missed)		(penalty scored) Vitale; (penalty scored) Coda; (penalty scored) Zito; (penalty scored) Donnarumma

7 August 2016	Frosinone (2)	3–0	Como (3)	Frosinone
20:30 CEST (UTC+2)	Paganini 14'; Frara 56'; D. Ciofani 78' (pen.)	Report		Stadium: Stadio Matusa; Attendance: 3,737; Referee: Livio Marinelli

7 August 2016	Trapani (2)	3–0	Seregno (4)	Erice
20:30 CEST (UTC+2)	De Cenco 2', 34'; Coronado 71'	Report		Stadium: Polisportivo Provinciale; Attendance: 6,318; Referee: Francesco Saia

7 August 2016	Perugia (2)	1–0	Alessandria (3)	Perugia
20:30 CEST (UTC+2)	Brighi 44'	Report		Stadium: Renato Curi; Attendance: 3,185; Referee: Juan Sacchi

7 August 2016	Ternana (2)	2–0 (a.e.t.)	Pordenone (3)	Terni
20:30 CEST (UTC+2)	Palombi 104'; La Gumina 119'			Stadium: Libero Liberati; Attendance: 2,500; Referee: Daniele Martinelli

7 August 2016	Cesena (2)	2–0	Arezzo (3)	Cesena
20:45 CEST (UTC+2)	Schiavone 54'; Ciano 90+6'	Report		Stadium: Dino Manuzzi; Attendance: 3,762; Referee: Daniele Chiffi

7 August 2016	Latina (2)	1–0	Matera (3)	Latina
20:45 CEST (UTC+2)	Paponi 19'	Report		Stadium: Domenico Francioni; Attendance: 1,705; Referee: Niccolo Baroni

8 August 2016	Ascoli (2)	2–2 (a.e.t.) (6–7 p)	Lecce (3)	Ascoli Piceno
20:30 CEST (UTC+2)	Gatto 73'; Mengoni 90+2'	Report	Lepore 37'; Caturano 56'	Stadium: Cino e Lillo Del Duca; Attendance: 4,725; Referee: Luigi Nasca
	Penalties
	Pecorini (penalty scored); Jaadi (penalty missed); Lazzari (penalty scored); Orsolini (penalty scored); Gatto (penalty scored); Augustyn (penalty scored); Hallberg (penalty scored); Mengoni (penalty missed)		(penalty scored) Vitofrancesco; (penalty scored) Vutov; (penalty scored) Giosa; (penalty missed) Fiordilino; (penalty scored) Lepore; (penalty scored) Arrigoni; (penalty scored) Cosenza; (penalty scored) Ciancio

=== Third round ===
A total of 32 teams from Serie A, Serie B and Lega Pro competed in the third round, sixteen of which advanced to the fourth round. The matches were played between 12 and 15 August 2016.

12 August 2016	Genoa (1)	3–2	Lecce (3)	Genoa
18:30 CEST (UTC+2)	Veloso 47'; Pandev 71'; Pavoletti 80'	Report	Lepore 60'; Torromino 62'	Stadium: Stadio Luigi Ferraris; Attendance: 8,828; Referee: Claudio Gavillucci

12 August 2016	Bologna (1)	2–0	Trapani (2)	Bologna
21:00 CEST (UTC+2)	Krejčí 42'; Taïder 47'	Report		Stadium: Renato Dall'Ara; Attendance: 11,841; Referee: Eugenio Abbattista

12 August 2016	Palermo (1)	1–0 (a.e.t.)	Bari (2)	Palermo
21:00 CEST (UTC+2)	Chochev 120+2'	Report		Stadium: Stadio Renzo Barbera; Attendance: 7,483; Referee: Daniele Doveri

13 August 2016	Udinese (1)	2–3	Spezia (2)	Udine
19:30 CEST (UTC+2)	De Paul 35'; Zapata 89'	Report	Valentini 37'; Okereke 40'; Nenê 59'	Stadium: Stadio Friuli; Attendance: 7,000; Referee: Rosario Abisso

13 August 2016	Chievo (1)	3–0	Virtus Entella (2)	Verona
20:45 CEST (UTC+2)	Meggiorini 36'; Castro 64'; Pellissier 82'			Stadium: Stadio Marcantonio Bentegodi; Attendance: 2,500; Referee: Fabio Maresca

13 August 2016	Novara (2)	1–0 (a.e.t.)	Latina (2)	Novara
20:30 CEST (UTC+2)	Troest 105'	Report		Stadium: Stadio Silvio Piola; Attendance: 1,890; Referee: Davide Massa

13 August 2016	Atalanta (1)	3–0	Cremonese (3)	Bergamo
20:45 CEST (UTC+2)	Toloi 11'; Polák 31' (o.g.); Kessié 75'	Report		Stadium: Stadio Atleti Azzurri d'Italia; Attendance: 4,143; Referee: Luca Pairetto

13 August 2016	Pescara (1)	2–0	Frosinone (2)	Pescara
20:30 CEST (UTC+2)	Verre 19', 51'	Report		Stadium: Stadio Adriatico; Attendance: 5,410; Referee: Antonio Damato

13 August 2016	Empoli (1)	2–0	Vicenza (2)	Empoli
20:45 CEST (UTC+2)	Maccarone 4' (pen.), 16'	Report		Stadium: Stadio Carlo Castellani; Attendance: 1,386; Referee: Massimiliano Irrati

13 August 2016	Perugia (2)	2–1	Carpi (2)	Perugia
20:30 CEST (UTC+2)	Bianchi 76', 79'	Report	Comi 65'	Stadium: Stadio Renato Curi; Attendance: 2,654; Referee: Maurizio Mariani

13 August 2016	Cesena (2)	2–0	Ternana (2)	Cesena
20:45 CEST (UTC+2)	Balzano 41'; Cascione 45'	Report		Stadium: Stadio Dino Manuzzi; Attendance: 3,103; Referee: Giampaolo Calvarese

13 August 2016	Torino (1)	4–1	Pro Vercelli (2)	Turin
20:30 CEST (UTC+2)	Ljajić 7'; Martínez 25'; Peres 50'; Boyé 87'	Report	La Mantia 56'	Stadium: Stadio Olimpico Grande Torino; Attendance: 13,356; Referee: Domenico Celi

14 August 2016	Salernitana (2)	1–1 (a.e.t.) (3–4 p)	Pisa (2)	Gubbio
19:00 CEST (UTC+2)	Donnarumma 1'	Report	Montella 90+3'	Stadium: Stadio Pietro Barbetti; Attendance: 350; Referee: Paolo Valeri
	Penalties
	Vitale (penalty scored); Caccavallo (penalty missed); Zito (penalty scored); Donnarumma (penalty scored); Coda (penalty missed)		(penalty scored) Mannini; (penalty missed) Lupoli; (penalty scored) Peralta; (penalty scored) Di Tacchio; (penalty scored) Montella

14 August 2016	Hellas Verona (2)	2–1	Crotone (1)	Verona
20:45 CEST (UTC+2)	Fossati 11'; Zuculini 78'	Report	Simy 62'	Stadium: Stadio Marcantonio Bentegodi; Attendance: 7,753; Referee: Carmine Russo

14 August 2016	Sampdoria (1)	3–0	Bassano Virtus (3)	Genoa
20:45 CEST (UTC+2)	Muriel 22', 63'; Budimir 68'	Report		Stadium: Stadio Luigi Ferraris; Attendance: 8,000; Referee: Michael Fabbri

15 August 2016	Cagliari (1)	5–1	SPAL (2)	Cagliari
21:00 CEST (UTC+2)	Borriello 24', 44', 65', 83'; Sau 40'	Report	Antenucci 85'	Stadium: Stadio Sant'Elia; Attendance: 6,200; Referee: Davide Ghersini

=== Fourth round ===
Fourth round matches were played between 29 November and 1 December 2016.

29 November 2016	Empoli (1)	1–2 (a.e.t.)	Cesena (2)	Empoli
15:00 CET (UTC+1)	Gilardino 79'	Report	Panico 67'; Rodríguez 102'	Stadium: Stadio Carlo Castellani; Attendance: 644; Referee: Luigi Nasca

29 November 2016	Chievo (1)	3–0	Novara (2)	Verona
18:00 CET (UTC+1)	Inglese 27', 30' (pen.); Cesar 49'	Report		Stadium: Stadio Marcantonio Bentegodi; Attendance: 850; Referee: Riccardo Pinzani

29 November 2016	Torino (1)	4–0 (a.e.t.)	Pisa (2)	Turin
21:00 CET (UTC+1)	Ljajić 93'; López 111'; Boyé 113'; Belotti 117'	Report		Stadium: Stadio Olimpico Grande Torino; Attendance: 10,875; Referee: Piero Giacomelli

30 November 2016	Palermo (1)	0–0 (a.e.t.) (4–5 p)	Spezia (2)	Palermo
15:00 CET (UTC+1)		Report		Stadium: Stadio Renzo Barbera; Attendance: 4,629; Referee: Gianluca Aureliano
	Penalties
	Diamanti (penalty scored); Hiljemark (penalty scored); Aleesami (penalty scored); Quaison (penalty scored); Balogh (penalty missed); Goldaniga (penalty missed)		(penalty scored) Sciaudone; (penalty scored) Okereke; (penalty scored) Piu; (penalty missed) Galli; (penalty scored) Chichizola; (penalty scored) Migliore

30 November 2016	Atalanta (1)	3–0	Pescara (1)	Bergamo
18:00 CET (UTC+1)	Raimondi 7'; Grassi 29'; Pešić 90+3'	Report		Stadium: Stadio Atleti Azzurri d'Italia; Attendance: 6,344; Referee: Federico La Penna

30 November 2016	Sampdoria (1)	3–0	Cagliari (1)	Genoa
21:00 CET (UTC+1)	Álvarez 13'; Schick 71', 90'	Report		Stadium: Stadio Luigi Ferraris; Attendance: 4,479; Referee: Michael Fabbri

1 December 2016	Genoa (1)	4–3 (a.e.t.)	Perugia (2)	Genoa
18:00 CET (UTC+1)	Simeone 3'; Pandev 37', 100'; Ninković 116'	Report	Bianchi 53'; Drolè 63'; Di Nolfo 120+1'	Stadium: Stadio Luigi Ferraris; Attendance: 4,764; Referee: Fabio Maresca

1 December 2016	Bologna (1)	4–0	Hellas Verona (2)	Bologna
21:00 CET (UTC+1)	Di Francesco 31'; Mounier 39', 86'; Krafth 90+1'	Report		Stadium: Renato Dall'Ara; Attendance: 7,956; Referee: Luca Pairetto

== Final stage ==
=== Bracket ===
Round of 16
Juventus (1)	3
Atalanta (1)	2
Milan (1)	2
Torino (1)	1
Napoli (1)	3
Spezia (2)	1
Fiorentina (1)	1
Chievo (1)	0
Internazionale (1) (aet)	3
Bologna (1)	2
Lazio (1)	4
Genoa (1)	2
Roma (1)	4
Sampdoria (1)	0
Sassuolo (1)	1
Cesena (2)	2

Quarter-finals
Juventus	2
Milan	1
Napoli	1
Fiorentina	0
Internazionale	1
Lazio	2
Roma	2
Cesena	1

Semi-finals
Juventus	3	2	5
Napoli	1	3	4
Lazio	2	2	4
Roma	0	3	3

Final
Juventus	2
Lazio	0

==== Round of 16 ====
Round of 16 matches were played from 10 to 19 January 2017.

10 January 2017	Napoli (1)	3–1	Spezia (2)	Naples
21:00 CET (UTC+1)	Zieliński 3'; Giaccherini 55'; Gabbiadini 57'	Report	Piccolo 35'	Stadium: Stadio San Paolo; Attendance: 22,329; Referee: Luca Pairetto

11 January 2017	Fiorentina (1)	1–0	Chievo (1)	Florence
17:30 CET (UTC+1)	Bernardeschi 90+3' (pen.)	Report		Stadium: Stadio Artemio Franchi; Attendance: 6,477; Referee: Domenico Celi

11 January 2017	Juventus (1)	3–2	Atalanta (1)	Turin
20:45 CET (UTC+1)	Dybala 22'; Mandžukić 34'; Pjanić 75' (pen.)	Report	Konko 72'; Latte Lath 81'	Stadium: Juventus Stadium; Attendance: 38,023; Referee: Piero Giacomelli

12 January 2017	Milan (1)	2–1	Torino (1)	Milan
21:00 CET (UTC+1)	Kucka 61'; Bonaventura 64'	Report	Belotti 27'	Stadium: San Siro; Attendance: 13,892; Referee: Carmine Russo

17 January 2017	Internazionale (1)	3–2 (a.e.t.)	Bologna (1)	Milan
21:00 CET (UTC+1)	Murillo 34'; Palacio 39'; Candreva 98'	Report	Džemaili 43'; Donsah 73'	Stadium: San Siro; Attendance: 23,478; Referee: Maurizio Mariani

18 January 2017	Lazio (1)	4–2	Genoa (1)	Rome
21:00 CET (UTC+1)	Đorđević 20'; Hoedt 31'; Milinković-Savić 70'; Immobile 75'	Report	Pinilla 41'; Pandev 45'	Stadium: Stadio Olimpico; Attendance: 10,000; Referee: Antonio Damato

18 January 2017	Sassuolo (1)	1–2	Cesena (2)	Reggio Emilia
17:30 CET (UTC+1)	Pellegrini 4'	Report	Ciano 81' (pen.); Laribi 84'	Stadium: Mapei Stadium – Città del Tricolore; Attendance: 1,920; Referee: Gianluca Rocchi

19 January 2017	Roma (1)	4–0	Sampdoria (1)	Rome
21:00 CET (UTC+1)	Nainggolan 39', 90'; Džeko 47'; El Shaarawy 61'	Report		Stadium: Stadio Olimpico; Attendance: 33,507; Referee: Gianpaolo Calvarese

==== Quarter-finals ====
Quarter-final matches were played from 24 January to 1 February 2017.

24 January 2017	Napoli (1)	1–0	Fiorentina (1)	Naples
20:45 CET (UTC+1)	Callejón 71'	Report		Stadium: Stadio San Paolo; Attendance: 31,850; Referee: Daniele Doveri

25 January 2017	Juventus (1)	2–1	Milan (1)	Turin
20:45 CET (UTC+1)	Dybala 10'; Pjanić 21'	Report	Bacca 53'	Stadium: Juventus Stadium; Attendance: 40,142; Referee: Massimiliano Irrati

31 January 2017	Internazionale (1)	1–2	Lazio (1)	Milan
20:45 CET (UTC+1)	Brozović 84'	Report	Felipe Anderson 20'; Biglia 56' (pen.)	Stadium: San Siro; Attendance: 31,757; Referee: Marco Guida

1 February 2017	Roma (1)	2–1	Cesena (2)	Rome
20:45 CET (UTC+1)	Džeko 68'; Totti 90+7' (pen.)	Report	Garritano 73'	Stadium: Stadio Olimpico; Attendance: 26,204; Referee: Fabio Maresca

==== Semi-finals ====
The first semi-final legs were played on 28 February and 1 March, and the second legs were played on 4 and 5 April 2017.

===== First leg =====
28 February 2017	Juventus (1)	3–1	Napoli (1)	Turin
20:45 CET (UTC+1)	Dybala 47' (pen.), 69' (pen.); Higuaín 64'	Report	Callejón 36'	Stadium: Juventus Stadium; Attendance: 38,398; Referee: Paolo Valeri

1 March 2017	Lazio (1)	2–0	Roma (1)	Rome
20:45 CET (UTC+1)	Milinković-Savić 30'; Immobile 78'	Report		Stadium: Stadio Olimpico; Attendance: 28,000; Referee: Massimiliano Irrati

===== Second leg =====
4 April 2017	Roma (1)	3–2 (3–4 agg.)	Lazio (1)	Rome
20:45 CEST (UTC+2)	El Shaarawy 43'; Salah 66', 90'	Report	Milinković-Savić 37'; Immobile 56'	Stadium: Stadio Olimpico; Attendance: 43,721; Referee: Nicola Rizzoli

5 April 2017	Napoli (1)	3–2 (4–5 agg.)	Juventus (1)	Naples
20:45 CEST (UTC+2)	Hamšík 53'; Mertens 61'; Insigne 67'	Report	Higuaín 32', 59'	Stadium: Stadio San Paolo; Attendance: 48,421; Referee: Luca Banti

== Final ==
17 May 2017
21:00 CEST (UTC+2)

Juventus	2–0	Lazio
Dani Alves 12'; Bonucci 24'	Report

Stadio Olimpico, Rome
Attendance: 64,098
Referee: Paolo Tagliavento

== Top goalscorers ==
Rank	Player	Club	Goals
1	(Italy) Marco Borriello	Cagliari	4
1	(Argentina) Paulo Dybala	Juventus	4
1	(North Macedonia) Goran Pandev	Genoa	4
4	(Italy) Rolando Bianchi	Perugia	3
4	(Italy) Luca Cognigni	Ancona	3
4	(Italy) Stefano Del Sante	Juve Stabia	3
4	(Argentina) Gonzalo Higuaín	Juventus	3
4	(Italy) Ciro Immobile	Lazio	3
4	(Serbia) Sergej Milinković-Savić	Lazio	3

== Notes ==
1. The Italian Sports Court decided to award the match to Matera against Caronnese as a 3–0 forfeit win after Caronnese were found guilty of fielding an ineligible player (Filippo Sgarbi). The match originally ended 2–1 to Matera
