= 2012–13 Coppa Italia =

TIM Cup

Tournament details
- Country: Italy
- Dates: 4 Aug 2012 – 26 May 2013
- Teams: 78

Final positions
- Champions: Lazio (6th title)
- Runners-up: Roma

Tournament statistics
- Matches played: 79
- Goals scored: 257 (3.25 per match)
- Top goal scorer: Mattia Destro (5 goals)

The 2012–13 Coppa Italia, also known as TIM Cup for sponsorship reasons, was the 66th edition of the domestic competition. As in the previous year, 78 clubs have taken part in the tournament. Napoli were the cup holders. Lazio were the winners, thus qualifying for the group stage of the 2013–14 UEFA Europa League.

== Participating teams ==
Serie A (20 teams)

- Atalanta (round of 16)
- Bologna (quarter-finals)
- Cagliari (round of 16)
- Catania (quarter-finals)
- Chievo (fourth round)
- Fiorentina (quarter-finals)
- Genoa (third round)
- Internazionale (semi-finals)
- Juventus (semi-finals)
- Lazio (winner)
- Milan (quarter-finals)
- Napoli (round of 16)
- Palermo (fourth round)
- Parma (round of 16)
- Pescara (fourth round)
- Roma (Runner Up)
- Sampdoria (third round)
- Siena (round of 16)
- Torino (fourth round)
- Udinese (round of 16)

Serie B (22 teams)

- Ascoli (third round)
- Bari (second round)
- Brescia (second round)
- Cesena (fourth round)
- Cittadella (fourth round)
- Crotone (third round)
- Empoli (second round)
- Grosseto (second round)
- Juve Stabia (fourth round)
- Lecce (third round)
- Livorno (fourth round)
- Modena (third round)
- Novara (third round)
- Padova (third round)
- Pro Vercelli (second round)
- Reggina (round of 16)
- Sassuolo (third round)
- Spezia (third round)
- Ternana (third round)
- Varese (third round)
- Hellas Verona (round of 16)
- Virtus Lanciano (second round)

Lega Pro (27 teams)

- AlbinoLeffe (first round)
- Andria BAT (first round)
- Avellino (second round)
- Barletta (first round)
- Benevento (second round)
- Carpi (third round)
- Carrarese (second round)
- Catanzaro (first round)
- Chieti (second round)
- Cremonese (third round)
- Cuneo (first round)
- Frosinone (second round)
- Gubbio (first round)
- Lumezzane (second round)
- Nocerina (second round)
- Paganese (first round)
- Perugia (third round)
- Pisa (second round)
- Portogruaro (second round)
- Reggiana (first round)
- San Marino (first round)
- Sorrento (second round)
- Südtirol (second round)
- Trapani (second round)
- Treviso (first round)
- Vicenza (third round)
- Virtus Entella (second round)

LND – Serie D (9 teams)

- Arezzo (first round)
- Chieri (first round)
- Marino (first round)
- Cosenza (first round)
- Delta Porto Tolle (first round)
- Este (first round)
- Pontisola (second round)
- Sambenedettese (first round)
- Sarnese (first round)

== Format and seeding ==
Teams enter the competition at various stages, as follows:

- First phase (one-legged fixtures)
  - First round: 36 teams from Lega Pro and Serie D start the tournament
  - Second round: the 18 winners from the previous round are joined by the 22 Serie B teams
  - Third round: the 20 winners from the second round meet the 12 Serie A sides seeded 9–20
  - Fourth round: the 16 survivors face each other
- Second phase
  - Round of 16 (one-legged): the 8 fourth round winners are inserted into a bracket with the Serie A clubs seeded 1–8
  - Quarter-finals (one-legged)
  - Semi-finals (two-legged)
- Final (one-legged) at the Stadio Olimpico in Rome

== Elimination rounds ==
The draw for 2012–13 Coppa Italia took place on 25 July.

=== Section 1 ===
First Round
Cremonese	4
Chieri	0
Reggiana	0
Virtus Entella	2

Second Round
Brescia	1
Cremonese (a.e.t.)	2
Hellas Verona	3
Virtus Entella	2

Third Round
Palermo	3
Cremonese	1
Genoa	1 (1)
Hellas Verona (pen.)	1 (4)

Fourth Round
Palermo	1
Hellas Verona	2

==== Match details ====
===== First round =====
4 August 2012
17:30 CEST

Cremonese	4–0	Chieri
Đurić 11'; Le Noci 79'; Filippini 83', 90'	Report

Stadio Giovanni Zini, Cremona
Attendance: 857
Referee: Paolo Marchesini

5 August 2012
20:45 CEST

Reggiana	0–2	Virtus Entella
	Report	Vannucchi 14'; Marchi 85'

Stadio Città del Tricolore, Reggio Emilia
Attendance: 973
Referee: Diego Bruno

===== Second round =====
12 August 2012
20:30 CEST

Brescia	1–2 (a.e.t.)	Cremonese
Caracciolo 81'	Report	Fietta 30'; Filippini 99' (pen.)

Stadio Mario Rigamonti, Brescia
Attendance: 2,872
Referee: Gianluca Manganiello

12 August 2012
20:30 CEST

Virtus Entella	2–3	Hellas Verona
Rosso 12', 53'	Report	Rivas 25'; Juanito 45', 50'

Stadio Comunale, Chiavari
Attendance: 2,000
Referee: Massimiliano Irrati

===== Third round =====
18 August 2012
20:45 CEST

Palermo	3–1	Cremonese
Miccoli 22', 34'; Iličić 73'	Report	Le Noci 25' (pen.)

Stadio Mario Rigamonti, Brescia
Attendance: 12,061
Referee: Daniele Doveri

18 August 2012
20:45 CEST

Genoa	1–1 (a.e.t.)	Hellas Verona
Janković 32'	Report	Bjelanović 65'
Penalties
Janković (penalty missed); Immobile (penalty missed); Canini (penalty scored)	1–4	(penalty scored) Bačinović; (penalty scored) Jorginho; (penalty scored) Laner; (penalty scored) Maietta

Stadio Luigi Ferraris, Genoa
Attendance: 8,000
Referee: Luca Banti

===== Fourth round =====
27 November 2012
20:45 CET

Palermo	1–2	Hellas Verona
Giorgi 7'	Report	Cocco 9'; Cacia 73'

Stadio Renzo Barbera, Palermo
Attendance: 7,620
Referee: Sebastiano Peruzzo

=== Section 2 ===
First Round
Gubbio	4
Pontisola (a.e.t.)	5
Benevento	1
San Marino	0
Barletta	0
Perugia	3

Second Round
Varese	2
Pontisola	1
Livorno	2
Benevento	1
Bari	1
Perugia (a.e.t.)	4

Third Round
Bologna	2
Varese	1
Livorno	4
Perugia	1

Fourth Round
Bologna	1
Livorno	0

==== Match details ====
===== First round =====
5 August 2012
20:30 CEST

Benevento	1–0	San Marino
Mancosu 62'	Report

Stadio Ciro Vigorito, Benevento
Attendance: 2,795
Referee: Lorenzo Illuzzi

5 August 2012
20:45 CEST

Gubbio	4–5 (a.e.t.)	Pontisola
Galabinov 6', 16'; Guerri 38'; Nappello 48'	Report	Ruggeri 31'; Crotti 50'; Salandra 55' (pen.); Stucchi 90'; Augello 97'

Stadio Pietro Barbetti, Gubbio
Attendance: 650
Referee: Emanuele Brodo

5 August 2012
20:30 CEST

Barletta	0–3	Perugia
	Report	Tozzi Borsoi 10'; Clemente 23'; Benedetti 90'

Stadio Cosimo Puttilli, Barletta
Attendance: 2,621
Referee: Pasquale Cangiano

===== Second round =====
12 August 2012
20:45 CEST

Varese	2–1	Pontisola
Ebagua 73'; Lazaar 81'	Report	Risi 23'

Stadio Franco Ossola, Varese
Attendance: 1,168
Referee: Francesco Boriello

12 August 2012
20:45 CEST

Livorno	2–1	Benevento
Dionisi 28' (pen.); Luci 59'	Report	Germinale 53'

Stadio Armando Picchi, Livorno
Attendance: 1,593
Referee: Federico La Penna

12 August 2012
20:30 CEST

Perugia	4–1 (a.e.t.)	Bari
Clemente 42'; Ciofani 97'; Fabinho 108', 112'	Report	Albadoro 41'

Stadio Renato Curi, Perugia
Attendance: 3,118
Referee: Angelo Giancola

===== Third round =====
18 August 2012
20:45 CEST

Bologna	2–1	Varese
Taïder 46', 71'	Report	Momentè 83'

Stadio Renato Dall'Ara, Bologna
Attendance: 5,021
Referee: Dino Tommasi

18 August 2012
20:45 CEST

Livorno	4–1	Perugia
Siligardi 55', 57'; Dionisi 68', 90+2'	Report	Clemente 45' (pen.)

Stadio Armando Picchi, Livorno
Attendance: 1,500
Referee: Paolo Valeri

===== Fourth round =====
28 November 2012
17:00 CET

Bologna	1–0	Livorno
Pasquato 35'	Report

Stadio Renato Dall'Ara, Bologna
Attendance: 770
Referee: Maurizio Mariani

=== Section 3 ===
First Round
Pisa	2
Arezzo	0

Second Round
Padova (pen.)	2(4)
Pisa	2(2)
Cesena (a.e.t.)	2
Pro Vercelli	1
Crotone	3
Virtus Lanciano	2

Third Round
Atalanta	2
Padova	0
Cesena	3
Crotone	2

Fourth Round
Atalanta	3
Cesena	1

==== Match details ====
===== First round =====
5 August 2012
20:00 CEST

Pisa	2–0	Arezzo
Gatto 4'; Pérez 13'	Report

Arena Garibaldi, Pisa
Attendance: 1,530
Referee: Fabio Piscopo

===== Second round =====
11 August 2012
20:00 CEST

Cesena	2–1 (a.e.t.)	Pro Vercelli
Lapadula 24'; Graffiedi 103'	Report	Di Piazza 86'

Stadio Dino Manuzzi, Cesena
Attendance: 2,940
Referee: Angelo Cervellera

12 August 2012
19:00 CEST

Padova	2–2 (a.e.t.)	Pisa
Babacar 25' (pen.); Cutolo 105'	Report	Benedetti 44'; Sabato 114'
Penalties
Zé Eduardo (penalty scored); Cutolo (penalty scored); Piccioni (penalty scored); Granoche (penalty scored)	4–2	(penalty scored) Favasuli; (penalty missed) Sabato; (penalty scored) Benedetti; (penalty missed) Tulli

Stadio Euganeo, Padua
Attendance: 1,492
Referee: Gennaro Palazzino

12 August 2012
20:45 CEST

Crotone	3–2	Virtus Lanciano
Calil 15' (pen.); Ciano 56'; Eramo 90'	Report	Testardi 3'; Falcone 58'

Stadio Ezio Scida, Crotone
Attendance: 1,870
Referee: Marco Di Bello

===== Third round =====
18 August 2012
20:45 CEST

Atalanta	2–0	Padova
Bonaventura 23'; Brivio 30'	Report

Stadio Atleti Azzurri d'Italia, Bergamo
Attendance: 4,000
Referee: Andrea Romeo

18 August 2012
20:30 CEST

Cesena	3–2	Crotone
Succi 16'; Graffiedi 50'; D'Alessandro 83'	Report	Iori 39' (o.g.); Ciano 44'

Stadio Dino Manuzzi, Cesena
Attendance: 2,886
Referee: Paolo Tagliavento

===== Fourth round =====
28 November 2012
15:00 CET

Atalanta	3–1	Cesena
Parra 41', 82'; De Luca 62'	Report	Tonucci 31'

Stadio Atleti Azzurri d'Italia, Bergamo
Attendance: 2,146
Referee: Davide Massa

=== Section 4 ===
First Round
Lumezzane	3
Sarnese	0
Frosinone (a.e.t.)	2
Delta Porto Tolle	0

Second Round
Novara	4
Lumezzane	3
Juve Stabia	3
Frosinone	0

Third Round
Fiorentina	2
Novara	0
Juve Stabia (pen.)	1 (4)
Sampdoria	1 (3)

Fourth Round
Fiorentina	2
Juve Stabia	0

==== Match details ====
===== First round =====
5 August 2012
18:00 CEST

Lumezzane	3–0	Sarnese
Inglese 2', 56'; Maccabiti 90'	Report

Nuovo Stadio Comunale, Lumezzane
Attendance: 300
Referee: Armando Gentile

5 August 2012
18:00 CEST

Frosinone	2–0 (a.e.t.)	Delta Porto Tolle
Ganci 109'; Aurelio 115'	Report

Stadio Matusa, Frosinone
Attendance: 1,000
Referee: Francesco Guccini

===== Second round =====
12 August 2012
18:00 CEST

Novara	4–3	Lumezzane
Inglese 12' (o.g.); González 41'; Piovaccari 46'; Motta 60'	Report	Giorico 16'; Marcolini 54'; Kirilov 68'

Stadio Silvio Piola, Novara
Attendance: 1,318
Referee: Leonardo Baracani

12 August 2012
20:30 CEST

Juve Stabia	3–0	Frosinone
Zito 16'; Acosty 23'; Danilevičius 45'	Report

Stadio Romeo Menti, Castellammare di Stabia
Attendance: 3,618
Referee: Diego Roca

===== Third round =====
18 August 2012
18:00 CEST

Fiorentina	2–0	Novara
Ljajić 43'; Pasqual 54'	Report

Stadio Artemio Franchi, Florence
Attendance: 12,952
Referee: Davide Massa

18 August 2012
20:30 CEST

Juve Stabia	1–1 (a.e.t.)	Sampdoria
Danilevičius 90+1'	Report	López 83'
Penalties
Erpen (penalty scored); Agyei (penalty missed); Di Cuonzo (penalty scored); Scognamiglio (penalty scored); Danilevičius (penalty scored)	4–3	(penalty missed) Poli; (penalty scored) Estigarribia; (penalty scored) Costa; (penalty scored) Soriano; (penalty missed) López

Stadio Romeo Menti, Castellammare di Stabia
Attendance: 3,988
Referee: Domenico Celi

===== Fourth round =====
28 November 2012
21:00 CET

Fiorentina	2–0	Juve Stabia
Seferovic 52'; Hegazy 73'	Report

Stadio Artemio Franchi, Florence
Attendance: 7,311
Referee: Domenico Celi

=== Section 5 ===
First Round
Vicenza	6
Andria BAT	0
AlbinoLeffe	0
Chieti	3

Second Round
Empoli	1
Vicenza	2
Lecce	3
Chieti	1

Third Round
Siena	4
Vicenza	2
Torino	4
Lecce	2

Fourth Round
Siena	2
Torino	0

==== Match details ====
===== First round =====
5 August 2012
17:00 CEST

Vicenza	6–0	Andria BAT
Gavazzi 1'; Minesso 29'; Misuraca 42', 54'; Mustacchio 47'; Martinelli 65'	Report

Stadio Romeo Menti, Vicenza
Attendance: 1,000
Referee: Marco Mainardi

5 August 2012
17:00 CEST

AlbinoLeffe	0–3	Chieti
	Report	Rossi 47'; Gigli 63'; De Sousa 88'

Stadio Atleti Azzurri d'Italia, Bergamo
Attendance: 300
Referee: Andrea Tardino

===== Second round =====
12 August 2012
20:45 CEST

Empoli	1–2	Vicenza
Moro 63'	Report	Romeo 47' (o.g.); Maiorino 84'

Stadio Carlo Castellani, Empoli
Attendance: 1,139
Referee: Massimiliano Velotto

12 August 2012
20:45 CEST

Lecce	3–1	Chieti
Corvia 38' (pen.); Giacomazzi 79'; Jeda 89'	Report	Capogna 40'

Stadio Via del Mare, Lecce
Attendance: 5,846
Referee: Francesco Castrignano

===== Third round =====
19 August 2012
20:45 CEST

Siena	4–2	Vicenza
Calaiò 26'; D'Agostino 56', 68'; Verre 90+5'	Report	Martinelli 17'; Minesso 57'

Stadio Artemio Franchi, Siena
Attendance: 3,000
Referee: Gianluca Rocchi

18 August 2012
20:30 CEST

Torino	4–2	Lecce
Sgrigna 3'; Ferrario 14' (o.g.); Bianchi 66', 75'	Report	Jeda 41'; Corvia 72' (pen.)

Stadio Olimpico, Turin
Attendance: 13,364
Referee: Mauro Bergonzi

===== Fourth round =====
28 November 2012
19:00 CET

Siena	2–0	Torino
Zé Eduardo 46'; Reginaldo 77'	Report

Stadio Artemio Franchi, Siena
Attendance: 1,000
Referee: Luigi Nasca

=== Section 6 ===
First Round
Avellino	3
Sambenedettese	1
Carrarese	5
Catanzaro	4
Trapani	2
Este	1

Second Round
Sassuolo	1
Avellino	0
Cittadella	2
Carrarese	0
Ternana	2
Trapani	0

Third Round
Catania	1
Sassuolo	0
Cittadella	1
Ternana	0

Fourth Round
Catania (a.e.t.)	3
Cittadella	1

==== Match details ====
===== First round =====
5 August 2012
17:30 CEST

Avellino	3–1	Sambenedettese
De Angelis 38', 83'; Castaldo 74'	Report	Pazzi 52'

Stadio Partenio, Avellino
Attendance: 3,000
Referee: Alessandro Greco

5 August 2012
18:00 CEST

Carrarese	5–4	Catanzaro
Giovinco 25', 37'; Merini 82'; Corrent 86'; Venitucci 89'	Report	Sirignano 17'; Bugatti 48'; Quadri 50' (pen.); Fioretti 66'

Stadio dei Marmi, Carrara
Attendance: 300
Referee: Tiziano Reni

5 August 2012
20:45 CEST

Trapani	2–1	Este
Madonia 76'; Docente 90'	Report	Filippi 45' (o.g.)

Stadio Polisportivo Provinciale, Erice
Attendance: 1,528
Referee: Rosario Abisso

===== Second round =====
11 August 2012
18:00 CEST

Ternana	2–0	Trapani
Alfageme 4'; Sinigaglia 12'	Report

Stadio Pietro Barbetti, Gubbio
Attendance: 450
Referee: Fabrizio Pasqua

12 August 2012
17:00 CEST

Sassuolo	1–0	Avellino
Troianiello 28'	Report

Stadio Alberto Braglia, Modena
Attendance: 611
Referee: Luca Pairetto

12 August 2012
17:00 CEST

Cittadella	2–0	Carrarese
Di Carmine 54'; Di Roberto 84'	Report

Stadio Pier Cesare Tombolato, Cittadella
Attendance: 711
Referee: Emilio Ostinelli

===== Third round =====
18 August 2012
20:30 CEST

Cittadella	1–0	Ternana
Di Roberto 90+4'	Report

Stadio Pier Cesare Tombolato, Cittadella
Attendance: 758
Referee: Piero Giacomelli

18 August 2012
20:45 CEST

Catania	1–0	Sassuolo
Gómez 73'	Report

Stadio Angelo Massimino, Catania
Attendance: 3,500
Referee: Maurizio Ciampi

===== Fourth round =====
4 December 2012
18:30 CET

Catania	3–1 (a.e.t.)	Cittadella
Bergessio 88', 102'; Lodi 96'	Report	Paolucci 41'

Stadio Angelo Massimino, Catania
Attendance: 2,000
Referee: Merchiori di Ferrara

=== Section 7 ===
First Round
Portogruaro	3
Cosenza	1
Südtirol (pen.)	1(5)
Cuneo	1(4)
Nocerina	1
Paganese	0

Second Round
Ascoli (a.e.t.)	2
Portogruaro	1
Modena	2
Südtirol	0
Reggina	1
Nocerina	0

Third Round
Chievo	4
Ascoli	0
Modena	1
Reggina (a.e.t.)	5

Fourth Round
Chievo	0
Reggina	1

==== Match details ====
===== First round =====
4 August 2012
20:00 CEST

Portogruaro	3–1	Cosenza
Cunico 27' (pen.); Della Rocca 50', 80'	Report	Mosciaro 17' (pen.)

Stadio Piergiovanni Mecchia, Portogruaro
Attendance: 150
Referee: Luigi Rossi

5 August 2012
18:00 CEST

Südtirol	1–1 (a.e.t.)	Cuneo
Campo 86' (pen.)	Report	Sentinelli 88'
Penalties
Bertoni (penalty scored); Bontà (penalty scored); Thiam (penalty scored); Candido (penalty missed); Timpone (penalty scored)	4–3	(penalty scored) Fantini; (penalty missed) Lodi; (penalty scored) Sentinelli; (penalty scored) Longhi; (penalty missed) Ferri

Stadio Marco Druso, Bolzano
Attendance: 500
Referee: Daniele Rasia

5 August 2012
16:00 CEST

Nocerina	1–0	Paganese
Schetter 88'	Report

Stadio San Francesco d'Assisi, Nocera Inferiore
Attendance: 500
Referee: Francesco Fiore

===== Second round =====
12 August 2012
20:30 CEST

Ascoli	2–1 (a.e.t.)	Portogruaro
Scalise 79'; Soncin 101'	Report	Corazza 63'

Stadio Cino e Lillo Del Duca, Ascoli Piceno
Attendance: 1,772
Referee: Eugenio Abbattista

11 August 2012
17:30 CEST

Modena	2–0	Südtirol
Anđelković 9'; Ardemagni 31'	Report

Stadio Alberto Braglia, Modena
Attendance: 1,429
Referee: Aleandro Di Paolo

12 August 2012
20:30 CEST

Reggina	1–0	Nocerina
Ceravolo 28'	Report

Stadio Oreste Granillo, Reggio Calabria
Attendance: 2,053
Referee: Maurizio Mariani

===== Third round =====
18 August 2012
19:00 CEST

Chievo	4–0	Ascoli
Théréau 5', 27'; Pellissier 10'; David Di Michele 52'	Report

Stadio Euganeo, Padua
Attendance: 320
Referee: Andrea Gervasoni

11 August 2012
17:30 CEST

Modena	1–5 (a.e.t.)	Reggina
Ardemagni 73'	Report	Comi 13'; Barillà 92'; Fischnaller 95'; Viola 97'; Sarno 117'

Stadio Alberto Braglia, Modena
Attendance: 1,410
Referee: Michael Fabbri

===== Fourth round =====
28 November 2012
15:00 CET

Chievo	0–1	Reggina
	Report	Lucioni 60'

Stadio Marc'Antonio Bentegodi, Verona
Attendance: 599
Referee: Piero Giacomelli

=== Section 8 ===
First Round
Sorrento	2
Treviso	0
Carpi	5
Marino	0

Second Round
Spezia	4
Sorrento	1
Grosseto	1
Carpi	3

Third Round
Cagliari	2
Spezia	1
Pescara	1
Carpi	0

Fourth Round
Cagliari	4
Pescara	2

==== Match details ====
===== First round =====
5 August 2012
17:00 CEST

Sorrento	2–0	Treviso
Corsetti 49', 90'	Report

Stadio Simonetta Lamberti, Cava de' Tirreni
Attendance: 200
Referee: Carmine Di Ruberto

5 August 2012
18:00 CEST

Carpi	5–0	Marino
Arma 5', 10'; Di Gaudio 12'; Lollini 84'; Perini 86'	Report

Stadio Sandro Cabassi, Carpi
Attendance: 150
Referee: Claudio Lanza

===== Second round =====
12 August 2012
20:30 CEST

Spezia	4–1	Sorrento
Benedetti 49'; Evacuo 77', 86'; Sansovini 85'	Report	Basso 78'

Stadio Alberto Picco, La Spezia
Attendance: 3,308
Referee: Riccardo Pinzani

12 August 2012
20:45 CEST

Grosseto	1–3	Carpi
Sforzini 1'	Report	Kabine 52'; De Bode 65'; Di Gaudio 90'

Stadio Olimpico Carlo Zecchini, Grosseto
Attendance: 632
Referee: Claudio Gavillucci

===== Third round =====
18 August 2012
20:30 CEST

Cagliari	2–1	Spezia
Pinilla 23'; Larrivey 90+2'	Report	Di Gennaro 68' (pen.)

Stadio Nereo Rocco, Trieste
Attendance: 51
Referee: Sebastiano Peruzzo

18 August 2012
20:45 CEST

Pescara	1–0	Carpi
Abbruscato 38'	Report

Stadio Adriatico, Pescara
Attendance: 6,878
Referee: Antonio Giannoccaro

===== Fourth round =====
5 December 2012
18:30 CET

Cagliari	4–2	Pescara
Ribeiro 6', 21', 61'; Pinilla 76'	Report	Cascione 33' (pen.); Weiss 79'

Stadio Is Arenas, Quartu Sant'Elena
Attendance: 5,000
Referee: Leonardo Baracani

== Final stage ==
=== Bracket ===
Round of 16
1	Internazionale	2
Hellas Verona	0
8	Napoli	1
Bologna	2
5	Roma	3
Atalanta	0
4	Udinese	0
Fiorentina	1
3	Lazio (pen.)	1(4)
Siena	1(1)
6	Parma	1(3)
Catania (pen.)	1(4)
7	Milan	3
Reggina	0
2	Juventus	1
Cagliari	0

Quarter-finals
Internazionale (a.e.t.)	3
Bologna	2
Roma (a.e.t.)	1
Fiorentina	0
Lazio	3
Catania	0
Milan	1
Juventus (a.e.t.)	2

Semi-finals
Internazionale	1	2	3
Roma	2	3	5
Lazio	1	2	3
Juventus	1	1	2

Final
Roma	0
Lazio	1

==== Round of 16 ====
11 December 2012
21:00 CET

Roma	3–0	Atalanta
Pjanić 21'; Osvaldo 31'; Destro 51'	Report

Stadio Olimpico, Rome
Attendance: 9,769
Referee: Carmine Russo

12 December 2012
17:30 CET

Parma	1–1 (a.e.t.)	Catania
Pabón 12'	Report	Lodi 19' (pen.)
Penalties
Pabón (penalty scored); Marchionni (penalty scored); Parolo (penalty missed); Ninis (penalty scored); Paletta (penalty missed)	3–4	(penalty missed) Barrientos; (penalty scored) Álvarez; (penalty scored) Lodi; (penalty scored) Bergessio; (penalty scored) Marchese

Stadio Ennio Tardini, Parma
Attendance: 2,000
Referee: Davide Massa

8 January 2013
21:00 CET

Juventus	1–0	Cagliari
Giovinco 57'	Report

Juventus Stadium, Turin
Attendance: 18,932
Referee: Marco Guida

8 January 2013
21:00 CET

Milan	3–0	Reggina
Yepes 51'; Niang 79'; Pazzini 81'	Report

San Siro, Milan
Attendance: 3,661
Referee: Giampaolo Calvarese

9 January 2013
21:00 CET

Internazionale	2–0	Hellas Verona
Cassano 50'; Guarín 54'	Report

San Siro, Milan
Attendance: 11,840
Referee: Gianluca Rocchi

9 January 2013
15:00 CET

Lazio	1–1 (a.e.t.)	Siena
Ciani 90+5'	Report	Cana 56' (o.g.)
Penalties
Mauri (penalty scored); Ledesma (penalty scored); Floccari (penalty scored); Kozák (penalty scored)	4–1	(penalty scored) Belmonte; (penalty missed) Vergassola; (penalty missed) Larrondo

Stadio Olimpico, Rome
Attendance: 6,682
Referee: Piero Giacomelli

9 January 2013
17:30 CET

Udinese	0–1	Fiorentina
	Report	Valero 36'

Stadio Friuli, Udine
Attendance: 8,000
Referee: Gianpaolo Calvarese

10 January 2013
21:00 CET

Napoli	1–2	Bologna
Cavani 12'	Report	Pasquato 38'; Kone 90+2'

Stadio San Paolo, Naples
Attendance: 10,366
Referee: Daniele Doveri

==== Quarter-finals ====
15 January 2013
21:00 CET

Lazio	3–0	Catania
Radu 30'; Hernanes 61', 90+1'	Report

Stadio Olimpico, Rome
Attendance: 16,537
Referee: Domenico Celi

15 January 2013
20:45 CET

Juventus	2–1 (a.e.t.)	Milan
Giovinco 13'; Vučinić 96'	Report	El Shaarawy 6'

Juventus Stadium, Turin
Attendance: 38,792
Referee: Paolo Silvio Mazzoleni

15 January 2013
21:00 CET

Internazionale	3–2 (a.e.t.)	Bologna
Guarín 34'; Palacio 77'; Ranocchia 120'	Report	Diamanti 81'; Gabbiadini 84'

San Siro, Milan
Attendance: 8,734
Referee: Luca Banti

16 January 2013
21:00 CET

Fiorentina	0–1 (a.e.t.)	Roma
	Report	Destro 97'

Stadio Artemio Franchi, Florence
Attendance: 20,003
Referee: Nicola Rizzoli

==== Semi-finals ====
===== First leg =====
22 January 2013
20:45 CET

Juventus	1–1	Lazio
Peluso 63'	Report	Mauri 86'

Juventus Stadium, Turin
Attendance: 32,433
Referee: Antonio Damato

23 January 2013
20:45 CET

Roma	2–1	Internazionale
Florenzi 13'; Destro 33'	Report	Palacio 44'

Stadio Olimpico, Rome
Attendance: 28,415
Referee: Andrea De Marco

===== Second leg =====
29 January 2013
20:45 CET

Lazio	2–1	Juventus
González 53'; Floccari 90+3'	Report	Vidal 90+2'

Stadio Olimpico, Rome
Attendance: 52,506
Referee: Luca Banti

17 April 2013
20:45 CEST

Internazionale	2–3	Roma
Jonathan 22'; Álvarez 80'	Report	Destro 55', 69'; Torosidis 74'

Stadio Giuseppe Meazza, Milan
Attendance: 52,634
Referee: Mauro Bergonzi

== Final ==
26 May 2013
18:00 CEST

Roma	0–1	Lazio
	Report	Lulić 71'

Stadio Olimpico, Rome
Attendance: 70,000
Referee: Daniele Orsato

== Top goalscorers ==
Rank	Player	Club	Goals
1	(Italy) Mattia Destro	Roma	5
2	(Italy) Alberto Filippini	Cremonese	3
2	(Italy) Federico Dionisi	Livorno	3
2	(Italy) Giampiero Clemente	Perugia	3
2	(Brazil) Thiago Ribeiro	Cagliari	3
