= 2016–17 Genoa CFC season =

Genoa
2016–17 season
- President: Enrico Preziosi
- Manager: Ivan Jurić (until 19 February 2017); Andrea Mandorlini (from 19 February 2017 to 10 April 2017); Ivan Jurić (from 10 April 2017)
- Stadium: Stadio Luigi Ferraris
- Serie A: 16th
- Coppa Italia: Round of 16
- Top goalscorer: League: Giovanni Simeone (11); All: Giovanni Simeone (12)
- Highest home attendance: 31,190 vs Sampdoria (11 March 2017, Serie A)
- Lowest home attendance: 4,764 vs Perugia (1 December 2016, Coppa Italia)
- Average home league attendance: 21,335
Home colours	Away colours	Third colours

The 2016–17 season was Genoa Cricket and Football Club's tenth consecutive season in Serie A.

== Season review ==
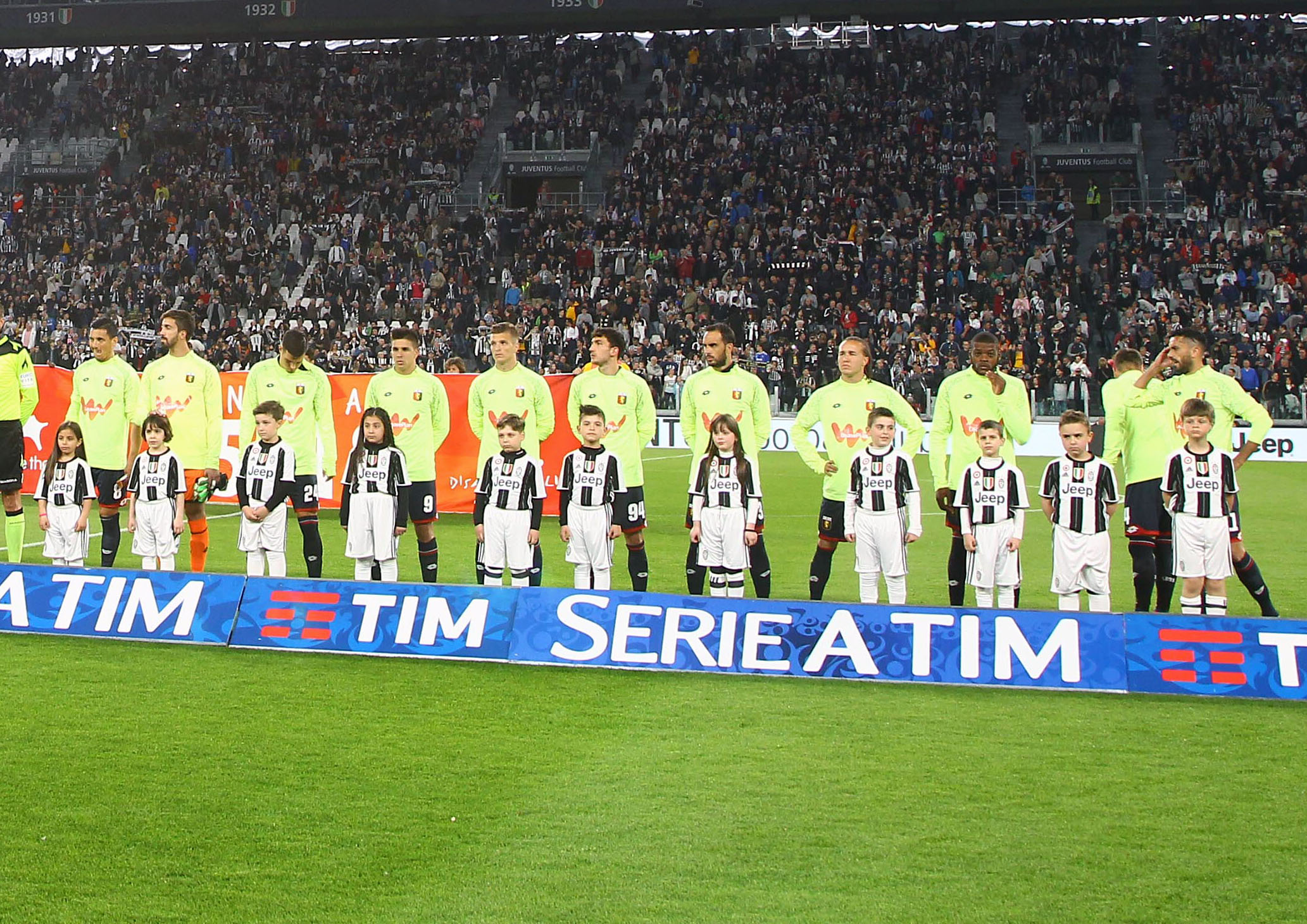
2016–17 Genoa team

The club competed in Serie A, finishing 16th after a poor league campaign, and in the Coppa Italia, where they were eliminated in the round of 16.

== Players ==
=== Squad information ===
As of 31 January 2017

Note: Flags indicate national team as defined under FIFA eligibility rules; some limited exceptions apply. Players may hold more than one non-FIFA nationality.

No.	Pos.	Nation	Player
1	GK	ITA	Mattia Perin
2	MF	BRA	Edenílson (on loan from Udinese)
3	DF	ARG	Santiago Gentiletti
4	MF	GHA	Isaac Cofie
5	DF	ITA	Armando Izzo
8	DF	ARG	Nicolás Burdisso (Captain)
9	FW	ARG	Giovanni Simeone
10	MF	FRA	Olivier Ntcham (on loan from Manchester City)
11	FW	ITA	Raffaele Palladino
14	DF	ITA	Davide Biraschi
15	MF	SWE	Oscar Hiljemark (on loan from Palermo)
16	MF	ITA	Andrea Beghetto
17	MF	MAR	Adel Taarabt (on loan from Benfica)
21	DF	ARG	Lucas Orbán
22	FW	SRB	Darko Lazović

No.	Pos.	Nation	Player
23	GK	ITA	Eugenio Lamanna
24	DF	ARG	Ezequiel Muñoz
27	FW	MKD	Goran Pandev
28	DF	ITA	Davide Brivio
30	MF	ITA	Luca Rigoni
32	MF	ITA	Leonardo Morosini
38	GK	CZE	Lukáš Zima
44	MF	POR	Miguel Veloso
51	FW	CHI	Mauricio Pinilla
64	FW	ITA	Pietro Pellegri
83	GK	BRA	Rubinho
93	MF	URU	Diego Laxalt
94	MF	ITA	Danilo Cataldi (on loan from Lazio)
99	MF	SRB	Nikola Ninković

== Transfers ==
=== In ===
Date	Pos.	Player	Age	Moving from	Fee	Notes	Source
30 June 2016	DF	(Italy) Francesco Renzetti					
18 July 2016	DF	(Argentina) Santiago Gentiletti	31	(Italy) Lazio			

==== Loans in ====
Date	Pos.	Player	Age	Moving from	Fee	Notes	Source

=== Out ===
Date	Pos.	Player	Age	Moving to	Fee	Notes	Source

==== Loans out ====
Date	Pos.	Player	Age	Moving to	Fee	Notes	Source

== Pre-season and friendlies ==
Friendly	v

== Competitions ==
=== Overall ===
Competition	Started round	Current position	Final position	First match	Last match
Serie A	Matchday 1	—	16th	21 August 2016	28 May 2017
Coppa Italia	Third round	—	Round of 16	12 August 2016	18 January 2017

Last updated: 28 May 2017

=== Serie A ===
==== League table ====
Pos	Team	Pld	W	D	L	GF	GA	GD	Pts	Qualification or relegation
14	Chievo	38	12	7	19	43	61	−18	43	
15	Bologna	38	11	8	19	40	58	−18	41	
16	Genoa	38	9	9	20	38	64	−26	36	
17	Crotone	38	9	7	22	34	58	−24	34	
18	Empoli (R)	38	8	8	22	29	61	−32	32	Relegation to Serie B

Source: Serie A, Soccerway
Rules for classification: 1) Points; 2) Head-to-head points; 3) Head-to-head goal difference; 4) Goal difference; 5) Goals scored; 6) Draw.
(R) Relegated

==== Results summary ====
Overall								Home						Away					
Pld	W	D	L	GF	GA	GD	Pts	W	D	L	GF	GA	GD	W	D	L	GF	GA	GD
38	9	9	20	38	64	−26	36	6	7	6	24	24	0	3	2	14	14	40	−26

Last updated: 28 May 2017.
Source: Competitive matches

==== Results by round ====
Round	1	2	3	4	5	6	7	8	9	10	11	12	13	14	15	16	17	18	19	20	21	22	23	24	25	26	27	28	29	30	31	32	33	34	35	36	37	38
Ground	H	A	H	A	H	H	A	H	A	H	A	H	A	H	A	A	H	A	H	A	H	A	H	A	A	H	A	H	A	H	A	H	A	H	H	A	H	A
Result	W	W	W	L	D	D	W	D	L	W	L	D	L	W	D	L	L	L	L	L	D	D	L	L	L	D	W	L	L	L	L	D	L	L	W	L	W	L
Position	2	1	4	7	8	11	8	9	12	8	10	10	12	10	11	10	12	12	12	14	15	15	16	16	16	16	15	16	16	16	16	16	16	16	16	16	16	16

Updated to match(es) played on 28 May 2017. Source: Competitive matches
A = Away; H = Home; W = Win; D = Draw; L = Loss

==== Matches ====
21 August 2016 1	Genoa	3–1	Cagliari	Genoa
20:45 CEST (UTC+02:00)	Izzo (yellow card) 15'; Burdisso (yellow card) 28'; Ntcham 78'; Laxalt 79'; Veloso (yellow card) 81'; Rigoni 88', (yellow card) 90'	Report	Ioniță (yellow card) 11'; Borriello (yellow card) 36', (goal) 66'; Munari (yellow card) 86'	Stadium: Stadio Luigi Ferraris; Attendance: 20,443; Referee: Daniele Orsato

28 August 2016 2	Crotone	1–3	Genoa	Pescara
20:45 CEST (UTC+02:00)	Ferrari (yellow card) 14'; Palladino 34', (yellow card) 68'	Report	Gakpé 51'; Pavoletti 55', 63'; Laxalt (yellow card) 62'; Izzo (yellow card) 88'	Stadium: Stadio Adriatico – Giovanni Cornacchia; Attendance: 821; Referee: Nicola Rizzoli

18 September 2016 4	Sassuolo	2–0	Genoa	Reggio Emilia
15:00 CEST (UTC+02:00)	Politano 58' (pen.); Defrel 66'	Report	Pavoletti (yellow card) 58'; Orbán (yellow card) 76'; Veloso (yellow card) 86' (red card) 86'	Stadium: Mapei Stadium – Città del Tricolore; Attendance: 10,134; Referee: Claudio Gavillucci

21 September 2016 5	Genoa	0–0	Napoli	Genoa
20:45 CEST (UTC+02:00)	Orbán (yellow card) 32'; Rincón (yellow card) 53'; Ntcham (yellow card) 75'; Simeone (yellow card) 77'	Report	Hysaj (yellow card) 52'; Jorginho (yellow card) 79'	Stadium: Stadio Luigi Ferraris; Attendance: 23,905; Referee: Antonio Damato

25 September 2016 6	Genoa	1–1	Pescara	Genoa
15:00 CEST (UTC+02:00)	Simeone 47'; Edenílson (yellow card) 50' (yellow-red card) 74'; Gakpé (yellow card) 51'; Pandev (red card) 77'; Rigoni (yellow card) 85'	Report	Zampano (yellow card) 53'; Campagnaro (yellow card) 77'; Manaj 85', (yellow card) 90'	Stadium: Stadio Luigi Ferraris; Attendance: 19,717; Referee: Massimiliano Irrati

2 October 2016 7	Bologna	0–1	Genoa	Bologna
15:00 CEST (UTC+02:00)	Gastaldello (yellow card) 43' (yellow-red card) 43'; Džemaili (red card) 87'	Report	Veloso (yellow card) 18'; Gentiletti (yellow card) 18' (yellow-red card) 85'; Rincón (yellow card) 25'; Simeone (yellow card) 43', (goal) 77'	Stadium: Stadio Renato Dall'Ara; Attendance: 18,840; Referee: Fabio Maresca

16 October 2016 8	Genoa	0–0	Empoli	Genoa
15:00 CEST (UTC+02:00)	Lazović (yellow card) 8' (yellow-red card) 34'	Report	Krunić (yellow card) 40'; Bellusci (yellow card) 49'; Saponara (yellow card) 60'; Tello (yellow card) 90+2'	Stadium: Stadio Luigi Ferraris; Attendance: 19,389; Referee: Luca Pairetto

22 October 2016 9	Sampdoria	2–1	Genoa	Genoa
18:00 CEST (UTC+02:00)	Muriel 12'; Izzo 47' (o.g.); Linetty (yellow card) 49'; Puggioni (yellow card) 79'	Report	Rigoni 24'; Perin (yellow card) 45+1'; Orbán (yellow card) 56'; Laxalt (yellow card) 68'	Stadium: Stadio Luigi Ferraris; Attendance: 29,824; Referee: Paolo Tagliavento

25 October 2016 10	Genoa	3–0	Milan	Genoa
20:45 CEST (UTC+02:00)	Ninković 11'; Izzo (yellow card) 40'; Pavoletti (yellow card) 74', (goal) 86'; Kucka 80' (o.g.); Veloso (yellow card) 85'	Report	Paletta (red card) 56'	Stadium: Stadio Luigi Ferraris; Attendance: 21,248; Referee: Luca Banti

30 October 2016 11	Atalanta	3–0	Genoa	Bergamo
12:30 CET (UTC+01:00)	Conti (yellow card) 6'; Kurtić 36', 45+2'; Gómez 84'	Report	Muñoz (yellow card) 1'; Laxalt (yellow card) 45'	Stadium: Stadio Atleti Azzurri d'Italia; Attendance: 16,245; Referee: Michael Fabbri

6 November 2016 12	Genoa	1–1	Udinese	Genoa
15:00 CET (UTC+01:00)	Ocampos 24'; Rigoni (yellow card) 53'; Ninković (yellow card) 79'	Report	Théréau 11'; Zapata (yellow card) 52'	Stadium: Stadio Luigi Ferraris; Attendance: 19,015; Referee: Gianluca Manganiello

20 November 2016 13	Lazio	3–1	Genoa	Rome
15:00 CET (UTC+01:00)	Felipe Anderson 11'; Biglia 57' (pen.); Wallace 65'; Patric (yellow card) 88'	Report	Ocampos 52'; Rincón (yellow card) 60'; Veloso (yellow card) 87'; Edenílson (yellow card) 88'; Orbán (red card) 90+1'	Stadium: Stadio Olimpico; Attendance: 20,000; Referee: Marco Di Bello

27 November 2016 14	Genoa	3–1	Juventus	Genoa
15:00 CET (UTC+01:00)	Simeone 3', 13'; Rincón (yellow card) 24'; Alex Sandro 29' (o.g.); Cofie (yellow card) 82'; Biraschi (yellow card) 90+4'	Report	Cuadrado (yellow card) 77'; Pjanić 82'; Sturaro (yellow card) 90+1'	Stadium: Stadio Luigi Ferraris; Attendance: 27,153; Referee: Paolo Mazzoleni

5 December 2016 15	Chievo	0–0	Genoa	Verona
19:00 CET (UTC+01:00)	Meggiorini (yellow card) 45'; Hetemaj (yellow card) 73'	Report	Muñoz (yellow card) 46'; Rigoni (yellow card) 61'; Lazović (yellow card) 90+3'	Stadium: Stadio Marc'Antonio Bentegodi; Attendance: 8,000; Referee: Carmine Russo

11 December 2016 16	Internazionale	2–0	Genoa	Milan
20:45 CET (UTC+01:00)	Brozović 38', 69'; Murillo (yellow card) 53'	Report	Ocampos (yellow card) 24'; Veloso (yellow card) 28'	Stadium: San Siro; Attendance: 33,788; Referee: Paolo Valeri

15 December 2016 3	Genoa	1–0	Fiorentina	Genoa
20:00 CET (UTC+01:00)	Veloso (yellow card) 27'; Lazović 37', (yellow card) 77'; Ninković (yellow card) 59'	Report	Tomović (yellow card) 19'; Badelj (yellow card) 85'	Stadium: Stadio Luigi Ferraris; Attendance: 20,651; Referee: Marco Guida
Note: Match originally scheduled for 11 September; play was stopped during the first half due to excessive rain, and was resumed from the point of suspension.

18 December 2016 17	Genoa	3–4	Palermo	Genoa
15:00 CET (UTC+01:00)	Simeone 4', 57'; Ntcham (yellow card) 48'; Rigoni (yellow card) 58'; Ninković 65'; Edenílson (yellow card) 68'; Perin (red card) 90+3'	Report	Anđelković (yellow card) 26'; Quaison 42'; Cionek (yellow card) 45+1'; Goldaniga (yellow card) 52', (goal) 69'; Jajalo (yellow card) 61'; Rispoli 88'; Trajkovski 90'; Nestorovski (yellow card) 90+5'	Stadium: Stadio Luigi Ferraris; Attendance: 19,003; Referee: Luca Pairetto

22 December 2016 18	Torino	1–0	Genoa	Turin
20:45 CET (UTC+01:00)	Castán (yellow card) 44'; Belotti 49', (yellow card) 66'	Report	Muñoz (yellow card) 16'; Izzo (yellow card) 71'; Ninković (yellow card) 72'; Burdisso (yellow card) 85'	Stadium: Stadio Olimpico Grande Torino; Attendance: 16,002; Referee: Fabio Maresca

8 January 2017 19	Genoa	0–1	Roma	Genoa
15:00 CET (UTC+01:00)	Cofie (yellow card) 27'; Ocampos (yellow card) 81'	Report	Izzo 36' (o.g.); Rüdiger (yellow card) 38'; De Rossi (yellow card) 49'; Strootman (yellow card) 66'; Fazio (yellow card) 84'	Stadium: Stadio Luigi Ferraris; Attendance: 21,289; Referee: Nicola Rizzoli

15 January 2017 20	Cagliari	4–1	Genoa	Cagliari
12:30 CET (UTC+01:00)	Borriello 40', 60'; João Pedro 44', (yellow card) 52'; Capuano (yellow card) 49' (yellow-red card) 79'; Colombo (yellow card) 61'; Farias 64' (pen.), (yellow card) 65'	Report	Simeone 28'; Cataldi (yellow card) 33'; Rigoni (yellow card) 76'	Stadium: Stadio Sant'Elia; Attendance: 6,915; Referee: Michael Fabbri
Note: Roberto Colombo was cautioned for dissent while a substitute.

22 January 2017 21	Genoa	2–2	Crotone	Genoa
15:00 CET (UTC+01:00)	Simeone 43'; Cataldi (yellow card) 58'; Ocampos 66' (pen.)	Report	Rosi (yellow card) 34'; Ceccherini 54'; Ferrari 74'; Crisetig (yellow card) 89'	Stadium: Stadio Luigi Ferraris; Attendance: 18,880; Referee: Maurizio Mariani

28 January 2017 22	Fiorentina	3–3	Genoa	Florence
15:00 CET (UTC+01:00)	Iličić 17'; Chiesa 50'; Badelj (yellow card) 54'; Kalinić 62'; Olivera (yellow card) 84'; Bernardeschi (red card) 85'; Astori (yellow card) 89'	Report	Cofie (yellow card) 27'; Burdisso (yellow card) 37'; Simeone (yellow card) 45', (goal) 57', 86' (pen.); Hiljemark 59'; Laxalt (yellow card) 66'	Stadium: Stadio Artemio Franchi; Attendance: 27,301; Referee: Daniele Orsato

5 February 2017 23	Genoa	0–1	Sassuolo	Genoa
15:00 CET (UTC+01:00)	Cataldi (yellow card) 48'; Izzo (yellow card) 60'	Report	Pellegrini 26'; Aquilani (yellow card) 33'	Stadium: Stadio Luigi Ferraris; Attendance: 18,686; Referee: Carmine Russo

10 February 2017 24	Napoli	2–0	Genoa	Naples
20:45 CET (UTC+01:00)	Zieliński 50'; Giaccherini 68'; Rog (yellow card) 90+2'	Report	Orbán (yellow card) 67'; Burdisso (yellow card) 80'	Stadium: Stadio San Paolo; Attendance: 42,347; Referee: Piero Giacomelli

19 February 2017 25	Pescara	5–0	Genoa	Pescara
15:00 CET (UTC+01:00)	Orbán 5' (o.g.); Biraghi (yellow card) 12'; Caprari 19', 81', (yellow card) 49'; Benali 31'; Cerri 87'	Report	Rigoni (yellow card) 9'	Stadium: Stadio Adriatico – Giovanni Cornacchia; Attendance: 11,142; Referee: Eugenio Abbattista

26 February 2017 26	Genoa	1–1	Bologna	Genoa
15:00 CET (UTC+01:00)	Cataldi (yellow card) 56'; Ntcham 90+4'	Report	Oikonomou (yellow card) 45+1'; Viviani 57'; Torosidis (red card) 75'	Stadium: Stadio Luigi Ferraris; Attendance: 18,788; Referee: Gianluca Rocchi

5 March 2017 27	Empoli	0–2	Genoa	Empoli
15:00 CET (UTC+01:00)	Bellusci (yellow card) 36'; Maccarone (yellow card) 63'; Dioussé (yellow card) 79'	Report	Rigoni (yellow card) 18'; Pinilla (yellow card) 75'; Ntcham 89'; Hiljemark 90+2'	Stadium: Stadio Carlo Castellani; Attendance: 7,655; Referee: Daniele Doveri

11 March 2017 28	Genoa	0–1	Sampdoria	Genoa
20:45 CET (UTC+01:00)	Cofie (yellow card) 20'; Pinilla (yellow card) 45'; Ntcham (yellow card) 51'; Burdisso (yellow card) 86'	Report	Sala (yellow card) 41'; Barreto (yellow card) 52'; Muriel 71', (yellow card) 72'; Viviano (yellow card) 90+2'	Stadium: Stadio Luigi Ferraris; Attendance: 31,190; Referee: Daniele Orsato

18 March 2017 29	Milan	1–0	Genoa	Milan
20:45 CET (UTC+01:00)	Fernández 33'; De Sciglio (yellow card) 78'	Report	Cataldi (yellow card) 36'; Gentiletti (yellow card) 90+2'	Stadium: San Siro; Attendance: 34,851; Referee: Carmine Russo

2 April 2017 30	Genoa	0–5	Atalanta	Genoa
15:00 CEST (UTC+02:00)	Rigoni (yellow card) 26'; Burdisso (yellow card) 47'; Pinilla (yellow card) 60' (red card) 60'	Report	Conti 25'; Gómez 32' (pen.), 63', 83'; Kessié (yellow card) 74'; Caldara 76'	Stadium: Stadio Luigi Ferraris; Attendance: 19,901; Referee: Claudio Gavillucci

9 April 2017 31	Udinese	3–0	Genoa	Udine
15:00 CEST (UTC+02:00)	De Paul 20', 49'; Zapata 31'; Evangelista (yellow card) 60'; Gabriel Silva (yellow card) 87'	Report	Burdisso (yellow card) 46'; Cofie (yellow card) 82'	Stadium: Stadio Friuli; Attendance: 16,126; Referee: Maurizio Mariani

15 April 2017 32	Genoa	2–2	Lazio	Genoa
15:00 CEST (UTC+02:00)	Simeone 10'; Palladino (yellow card) 40'; Rigoni (yellow card) 44'; Burdisso (yellow card) 45+1'; Pandev 78', (yellow card) 79'	Report	Parolo (yellow card) 25'; Milinković-Savić (yellow card) 30'; Biglia 45+2'; Basta (yellow card) 55'; Alberto 90+1'; Lombardi (yellow card) 90+3'	Stadium: Stadio Luigi Ferraris; Attendance: 19,545; Referee: Fabio Maresca

23 April 2017 33	Juventus	4–0	Genoa	Turin
15:00 CEST (UTC+02:00)	Muñoz 17' (o.g.); Dybala 18'; Mandžukić 41'; Bonucci 64'	Report	Burdisso (yellow card) 34'	Stadium: Juventus Stadium; Attendance: 39,594; Referee: Gianpaolo Calvarese

30 April 2017 34	Genoa	1–2	Chievo	Genoa
15:00 CEST (UTC+02:00)	Pandev 43'; Laxalt (yellow card) 83'	Report	Bastien 60'; Gobbi (yellow card) 68'; Radovanović (yellow card) 68'; Birsa 70'; Depaoli (yellow card) 80' (yellow-red card) 90+1'	Stadium: Stadio Luigi Ferraris; Attendance: 19,467; Referee: Luca Pairetto

7 May 2017 35	Genoa	1–0	Internazionale	Genoa
15:00 CEST (UTC+02:00)	Lazović (yellow card) 37'; Biraschi (yellow card) 61'; Pandev 70'; Burdisso (yellow card) 87'; Rigoni (yellow card) 90+2'	Report	Nagatomo (yellow card) 53'; Medel (yellow card) 77'; Kondogbia (red card) 89'	Stadium: Stadio Luigi Ferraris; Attendance: 20,980; Referee: Antonio Damato

14 May 2017 36	Palermo	1–0	Genoa	Palermo
15:00 CEST (UTC+02:00)	Rispoli 13'; Bruno Henrique (yellow card) 25'	Report	Rigoni (yellow card) 5'	Stadium: Stadio Renzo Barbera; Attendance: 8,863; Referee: Daniele Doveri

21 May 2017 37	Genoa	2–1	Torino	Genoa
15:00 CEST (UTC+02:00)	Rigoni (yellow card) 3', (goal) 32'; Veloso (yellow card) 49'; Simeone 54'	Report	Rossettini (yellow card) 10'; Acquah (yellow card) 36'; Lukić (yellow card) 45+2'; Ljajić (yellow card) 49', (goal) 89'; Boyé (yellow card) 80'	Stadium: Stadio Luigi Ferraris; Attendance: 26,106; Referee: Marco Guida

28 May 2017 38	Roma	3–2	Genoa	Rome
18:00 CEST (UTC+02:00)	Džeko 10', (yellow card) 90+5'; De Rossi 74'; Perotti 90', (yellow card) 90+2'	Report	Pellegri 3'; Lazović 79'	Stadium: Stadio Olimpico; Attendance: 59,716; Referee: Paolo Tagliavento

=== Coppa Italia ===
12 August 2016 Third round	Genoa	3–2	Lecce	Genoa
18:30 CEST (UTC+02:00)	Veloso 47'; Pandev 71'; Pavoletti 80'	Report	Lepore 60'; Torromino 62'	Stadium: Stadio Luigi Ferraris; Attendance: 8,828; Referee: Claudio Gavillucci

1 December 2016 Fourth round	Genoa	4–3 (a.e.t.)	Perugia	Genoa
18:00 CET (UTC+01:00)	Simeone 3'; Pandev 37', 100'; Lazović (yellow card) 110'; Ninković 116', (yellow card) 120'	Report	Del Prete (yellow card) 21'; Bianchi 53'; Drolè 63'; Di Nolfo 120+1'; Guberti (red card) 120+1'	Stadium: Stadio Luigi Ferraris; Attendance: 4,764; Referee: Fabio Maresca

18 January 2017 Round of 16	Lazio	4–2	Genoa	Rome
20:45 CET (UTC+01:00)	Đorđević 20'; Hoedt 31'; Patric (yellow card) 58'; Lulić (yellow card) 59'; Milinković-Savić 70'; Immobile 75'	Report	Pinilla 41'; Pandev 45'; Rigoni (yellow card) 56'; Gentiletti (yellow card) 76'	Stadium: Stadio Olimpico; Attendance: 10,000; Referee: Antonio Damato

== Statistics ==
=== Appearances and goals ===
No.	Pos	Nat	Player	Total		Serie A		Coppa Italia	
No.	Pos	Nat	Player	Apps	Goals	Apps	Goals	Apps	Goals
Goalkeepers
1	GK	(Italy) ITA	Mattia Perin	16	0	16	0	0	0
23	GK	(Italy) ITA	Eugenio Lamanna	24	0	20+1	0	3	0
38	GK	(Czech Republic) CZE	Lukáš Zima	0	0	0	0	0	0
58	GK	(Italy) ITA	Diego Faccioli	0	0	0	0	0	0
83	GK	(Brazil) BRA	Rubinho	2	0	2	0	0	0
Defenders
2	DF	(Brazil) BRA	Edenílson	17	0	9+7	0	1	0
3	DF	(Argentina) ARG	Santiago Gentiletti	17	0	15	0	1+1	0
5	DF	(Italy) ITA	Armando Izzo	30	0	29	0	1	0
8	DF	(Argentina) ARG	Nicolás Burdisso	38	0	35	0	3	0
14	DF	(Italy) ITA	Davide Biraschi	8	0	4+3	0	1	0
21	DF	(Argentina) ARG	Lucas Orbán	13	0	8+3	0	2	0
24	DF	(Argentina) ARG	Ezequiel Muñoz	32	0	25+6	0	1	0
28	DF	(Italy) ITA	Davide Brivio	0	0	0	0	0	0
Midfielders
4	MF	(Ghana) GHA	Isaac Cofie	17	0	11+4	0	2	0
10	MF	(France) FRA	Olivier Ntcham	23	3	10+10	3	0+3	0
15	MF	(Sweden) SWE	Oscar Hiljemark	13	2	10+3	2	0	0
16	MF	(Italy) ITA	Andrea Beghetto	3	0	1+2	0	0	0
17	MF	(Morocco) MAR	Adel Taarabt	6	0	1+5	0	0	0
30	MF	(Italy) ITA	Luca Rigoni	32	3	29+2	3	1	0
32	MF	(Italy) ITA	Leonardo Morosini	4	0	1+3	0	0	0
44	MF	(Portugal) POR	Miguel Veloso	25	1	22+1	0	2	1
93	MF	(Uruguay) URU	Diego Laxalt	39	1	36	1	3	0
94	MF	(Italy) ITA	Danilo Cataldi	13	0	10+3	0	0	0
99	MF	(Serbia) SRB	Nikola Ninković	19	3	5+12	2	0+2	1
Forwards
9	FW	(Argentina) ARG	Giovanni Simeone	36	13	29+6	12	1	1
11	FW	(Italy) ITA	Raffaele Palladino	12	0	9+3	0	0	0
22	FW	(Serbia) SRB	Darko Lazović	36	2	30+3	2	1+2	0
27	FW	(North Macedonia) MKD	Goran Pandev	23	7	6+14	3	3	4
51	FW	(Chile) CHI	Mauricio Pinilla	13	1	6+6	0	1	1
64	FW	(Italy) ITA	Pietro Pellegri	3	1	1+2	1	0	0
Players transferred out during the season
11	FW	(Argentina) ARG	Lucas Ocampos	17	3	12+2	3	2+1	0
13	FW	(Togo) TOG	Serge Gakpé	8	1	2+5	1	1	0
15	DF	(Italy) ITA	Giovanni Marchese	1	0	0+1	0	0	0
19	FW	(Italy) ITA	Leonardo Pavoletti	11	4	8+2	3	1	1
29	MF	(Italy) ITA	Riccardo Fiamozzi	5	0	1+3	0	1	0
88	MF	(Venezuela) VEN	Tomás Rincón	18	0	17	0	1	0

Last updated: 28 May 2017
Source: Competitions

=== Goalscorers ===
Rank	No.	Pos	Nat	Name	Serie A	Coppa Italia	Total
1	9	FW	(Argentina)	Giovanni Simeone	11	1	12
2	27	FW	(North Macedonia)	Goran Pandev	1	4	5
3	19	FW	(Italy)	Leonardo Pavoletti	3	1	4
4	10	MF	(France)	Olivier Ntcham	3	0	3
4	11	FW	(Argentina)	Lucas Ocampos	3	0	3
4	99	MF	(Serbia)	Nikola Ninković	2	1	3
7	15	MF	(Sweden)	Oscar Hiljemark	2	0	2
7	30	MF	(Italy)	Luca Rigoni	2	0	2
9	13	FW	(Togo)	Serge Gakpé	1	0	1
9	22	FW	(Serbia)	Darko Lazović	1	0	1
9	44	MF	(Portugal)	Miguel Veloso	0	1	1
9	51	FW	(Chile)	Mauricio Pinilla	0	1	1
9	93	MF	(Uruguay)	Diego Laxalt	1	0	1
Own goal					2	0	2
Totals					32	9	41

Last updated: 23 April 2017

=== Clean sheets ===
Rank	No.	Pos	Nat	Name	Serie A	Coppa Italia	Total
1	1	GK	(Italy)	Mattia Perin	6	0	6
2	23	GK	(Italy)	Eugenio Lamanna	1	0	1
Totals					7	0	7

Last updated: 23 April 2017

=== Disciplinary record ===
No.	Pos	Nat	Player	Serie A			Coppa Italia			Total		
No.	Pos	Nat	Player	Booked	(yellow card) (yellow-red card)	Sent off (straight red)	Booked	(yellow card) (yellow-red card)	Sent off (straight red)	Booked	(yellow card) (yellow-red card)	Sent off (straight red)
1	GK	(Italy)	Mattia Perin	1	0	1	0	0	0	1	0	1
2	DF	(Brazil)	Edenílson	2	1	0	0	0	0	2	1	0
3	DF	(Argentina)	Santiago Gentiletti	1	1	0	2	0	0	3	1	0
5	DF	(Italy)	Armando Izzo	5	0	0	0	0	0	5	0	0
8	DF	(Argentina)	Nicolás Burdisso	9	0	0	0	0	0	9	0	0
14	DF	(Italy)	Davide Biraschi	1	0	0	0	0	0	1	0	0
21	DF	(Argentina)	Lucas Orbán	4	0	1	0	0	0	4	0	1
24	DF	(Argentina)	Ezequiel Muñoz	3	0	0	0	0	0	3	0	0
4	MF	(Ghana)	Isaac Cofie	5	0	0	0	0	0	5	0	0
10	MF	(France)	Olivier Ntcham	3	0	0	0	0	0	3	0	0
30	MF	(Italy)	Luca Rigoni	10	0	0	1	0	0	11	0	0
44	MF	(Portugal)	Miguel Veloso	7	0	1	0	0	0	7	0	1
88	MF	(Venezuela)	Tomás Rincón	4	0	0	0	0	0	4	0	0
93	MF	(Uruguay)	Diego Laxalt	4	0	0	0	0	0	4	0	0
94	MF	(Italy)	Danilo Cataldi	5	0	0	0	0	0	5	0	0
99	MF	(Serbia)	Nikola Ninković	3	0	0	1	0	0	4	0	0
9	FW	(Argentina)	Giovanni Simeone	3	0	0	0	0	0	3	0	0
11	FW	(Argentina)	Lucas Ocampos	2	0	0	0	0	0	2	0	0
11	FW	(Italy)	Raffaele Palladino	1	0	0	0	0	0	1	0	0
13	FW	(Togo)	Serge Gakpé	1	0	0	0	0	0	1	0	0
19	FW	(Italy)	Leonardo Pavoletti	2	0	0	0	0	0	2	0	0
22	FW	(Serbia)	Darko Lazović	2	1	0	1	0	0	3	1	0
27	FW	(North Macedonia)	Goran Pandev	1	0	1	0	0	0	1	0	1
51	FW	(Chile)	Mauricio Pinilla	3	0	1	0	0	0	3	0	1
Totals				82	3	5	5	0	0	87	3	5

Last updated: 23 April 2017
