= Manuel Mancini =

Manuel Mancini may refer to:

- Manuel Mancini (footballer) (born 1983), Italian footballer
- Manuel Mancini (sport shooter) (born 1982), target shooter from San Marino
