= Jacopo Ferri =

Italian football player

Personal information
- Full name: Jacopo Ferri
- Date of birth: 5 April 1995 (age 31)
- Place of birth: Rome, Italy
- Height: 1.71 m (5 ft 7 1/2 in)
- Position: Forward

Youth career
- Maccarese
- –2015: Roma

Senior career*
Years	Team	Apps	(Gls)
2014–2018	Roma	0	(0)
2015–2016	→ SPAL (loan)	7	(1)
2016–2017	→ Messina (loan)	19	(0)
2017–2018	→ Piacenza (loan)	5	(0)
2018	→ Renate (loan)	4	(0)
2019–2020	Acharnaikos		
2020	Latina	4	(1)
2020–2021	Carpi	0	(0)

International career
2013	Italy U-19	4	(0)
- * Club domestic league appearances and goals as of 13 December 2020

Jacopo Ferri (born 5 April 1995) is an Italian football player.

== Club career ==
=== Roma ===
==== Loan to SPAL ====
On 20 July 2015, Ferri was signed by Serie C side SPAL on a season-long loan deal. On 2 August he made his debut for SPAL as a substitute replacing Marco Cellini in the 81st minute of a 1–0 home win over Rende in the first round of Coppa Italia. On 10 October he made his Serie C debut as a substitute replacing Michele Castagnetti in the 86th minute of a 0–0 away draw against Prato. On 24 October he scored his first professional goal, as a substitute, in the 91st minute of a 4–1 home win over Lupa Roma. On 8 May 2016, Ferri played his first match as a starter for SPAL, a 2–1 home defeat against Tuttocuoio, he was replaced by Gianmarco Zigoni in the 72nd minute. Ferri ended his loan to SPAL with 8 appearances and 1 goal.

==== Loan to Messina ====
On 11 July 2016, Ferri was loaned to Serie C club Messina on a season-long loan deal. On 31 July he made his debut for Messina as a substitute replacing Nicola Ciccone in the 76th minute of a 3–0 away win over Robur Siena in the first round of Coppa Italia. On 7 August he played in the second round, again as a substitute replacing Nicola Ciccone in the 71st minute of a 2–0 away defeat against SPAL. On 4 September he made his Serie C debut for Messina as a substitute replacing Giuseppe Madonia in the 63rd minute of a 2–0 away defeat against Reggina. On 11 September, Ferri played his first match as a starter for Messina, a 1–1 home draw against Virtus Francavilla, he was replaced by Felice Gaetano in the 61st minute. On 9 October he played his first entire match for Messina, a 3–1 away defeat against Catania. Ferri ended his loan to Messina with 21 appearances and 2 assists.

==== Loan to Piacenza and Renate ====
On 14 July 2017, Ferri was signed by Serie C side Piacenza on a season-long loan deal. On 30 July, Ferri made his debut for Piacenza in a 1–0 home win over Massese in the first round of Coppa Italia. He was replaced by Massimo Carollo in the 89th minute. On 12 August he played in the second round as a substitute replacing Simone Dalla Latta in the 89th minute of a 2–1 away defeat against Crotone. On 27 August he made his Serie C debut for Piacenza as a substitute replacing Andrea Nobile in the 46th minute of a 2–0 away defeat against Monza. In January 2018, Ferri was re-called to Roma leaving Piacenza with 7 appearances, only 1 as a starter, and 1 assist.

On 31 January 2018, he was loaned to Serie C club Renate on a 6-month loan deal. On 21 March he made his Serie C debut for Renate as a substitute replacing Francesco Finocchio in the 83rd minute of a 2–2 away draw against Gubbio. Ferri ended his 6-month loan to Renate with only 4 appearances, all as a substitute.

== International career ==
Ferri represented Italy only at Under-19 level. On 6 September 2013, Ferri made his debut at the U-19 level as a substitute, replacing Luca Crecco in the 62nd minute of a 1–0 home win over Bulgaria U-19. On 10 September 2013, he played his first match as a starter for Italy U-19, a 1–1 away draw against Netherlands U-19, he was replaced by Alessandro Capello in the 59th minute. Ferri played also two matches in the 2014 UEFA European Under-19 Championship qualifying round, a 2–0 defeat against Israel U-19 and a 5–0 win over Liechtenstein U-19.

== Career statistics ==
=== Club ===
As of 11 July 2018

Club	Season	League			Cup		Europe		Other		Total	
Club	Season	League	Apps	Goals	Apps	Goals	Apps	Goals	Apps	Goals	Apps	Goals
SPAL (loan)	2015–16	Serie C	7	1	1	0	—		—		8	1
Messina (loan)	2016–17	Serie C	19	0	2	0	—		—		21	0
Piacenza (loan)	2017–18	Serie C	5	0	2	0	—		—		7	0
Renate (loan)	2017–18	Serie C	4	0	—		—		—		4	0
Career total			35	1	5	0	—		—		40	1

== Honours ==
=== Club ===
Roma Primavera

- Supercoppa Primavera:2012

SPAL

- Serie C: 2015–16
