= Bonta =

Bonta is a surname. Notable people with the surname include:

- Brandon Bonta (born 2002), American professional ten-pin bowler
- Marcia Bonta (born 1940), American naturalist and writer
- Mia Bonta (born 1972), American politician
- Paula Bonta, Argentinian-Canadian computer scientist and educational software designer
- Reina Bonta (born 1999), American footballer
- Rob Bonta (born 1972), American politician
- Vanna Bonta (1953–2014), Italian-American writer, actress, and inventor
- Zoltán Bonta (born 1954), Hungarian filmmaker and videographer

== See also ==
- Francesco Bontà (born 1993), Italian footballer
- Americans for Prosperity Foundation v. Bonta, 2021 lawsuit
- Miller v. Bonta, pending lawsuit
