= Scalise =

Scalise is a surname. Notable people with the surname include:

- Frank Scalice (1893–1957), American mobster
- George Scalise, American labor leader
- John Scalise (1900–1929), American mobster
- Joseph Scalise (born 1937), American mobster
- Lawrence F. Scalise (1933–2015), Iowa Attorney General
- Manuel Scalise (born 1981), Italian footballer
- Steve Scalise (born 1965), United States Congressional Representative from Louisiana
