= Federico Palmieri =

Italian footballer

Personal information
- Date of birth: 1 July 1995 (age 31)
- Place of birth: Recanati, Italy
- Height: 1.76 m (5 ft 9 in)
- Position: Forward

Team information
- Current team: Recanatese

Senior career*
Years	Team	Apps	(Gls)
2012–2014	Recanatese	43	(14)
2014–2018	Carpi	1	(0)
2014–2015	→ Santarcangelo (loan)	2	(0)
2015–2016	→ Santarcangelo (loan)	11	(0)
2016–2017	→ Maceratese (loan)	29	(3)
2017–2018	→ Santarcangelo (loan)	15	(0)
2018	Tortolì Calcio	12	(2)
2018–	Recanatese	36	(4)
2019	→ Tolentino (loan)	13	(1)
- * Club domestic league appearances and goals as of 22:44, 2 April 2020 (UTC)

Federico Palmieri (born 1 July 1995) is an Italian football player. He plays for U.S.D. Recanatese 1923 in the Serie D.

== Club career ==
He made his Serie C debut for Santarcangelo on 8 November 2014 in a game against Ancona.
