= Rocco Sabato =

Italian footballer

Personal information
- Date of birth: 19 April 1982 (age 44)
- Place of birth: Potenza, Italy
- Height: 1.84 m (6 ft 0 in)
- Position: Defender

Youth career
- Sport ad Avigliano

Senior career*
Years	Team	Apps	(Gls)
2000–2001	Pavia	28	(0)
2001–2002	Fiorenzuola	30	(1)
2002–2003	Cosenza	17	(0)
2003–2005	Cagliari	23	(0)
2005–2009	Catania	49	(1)
2006–2007	→ Cesena (loan)	32	(2)
2009	Empoli	15	(0)
2009–2011	Triestina	33	(0)
2011–2012	Sorrento	22	(1)
2012–2014	Pisa	43	(1)
2014–2016	Pavia	17	(0)
2016	→ Maceratese (loan)	14	(0)
2016–2017	Vibonese	19	(0)
2017	Maceratese	15	(0)
2017–2018	Pavia	30	(0)
2018–2019	Trento	22	(1)
Total		409	(7)
- * Club domestic league appearances and goals

Rocco Sabato (born 19 April 1982) is an Italian former professional footballer who played as a defender, usually at left-back. He was a set piece specialist and scored his first Serie A goal from a free-kick with Calcio Catania during the 2008–09 season.

== Career ==
=== Pavia ===
Sabato began his professional football career with A.C. Pavia, following his transfer from his youth club, Sport ad Avigliano in the summer of 2000. During the 2000–01 Serie D season, Sabato managed to make 28 full appearances in his first season. After just one season with the club, he was sold to U.S. Fiorenzuola 1922.

=== Fiorenzuola ===
The young defender then transferred to U.S. Fiorenzuola 1922, in 2001, and again managed to hold a place in the club's starting XI. He made 30 appearances in his first season, playing mostly as a left back, and even managed a goal, which was the first of his professional career. Following his impressive form in the lower divisions of Italian football, he was sold to Cosenza Calcio 1914 prior to the start of the 2002–03 Serie B season.

=== Cosenza ===
Sabato officially transferred to Cosenza in July 2002, and was set for his first season in the Italian Serie B. Following his debut, Sabato went on to make an additional 16 appearances, and his displays caught the eye of several Serie A clubs. He soon transferred to another Serie B side, Cagliari Calcio for an undisclosed fee. Cosenza was expelled from the professional league on 31 July.

=== Cagliari ===
After officially joining the Sardinian club in July 2003, Sabato became a key member of the team for much of the campaign and made 21 first team appearances in the league alone, and helped the team to Serie A promotion for the 2004–05 Serie A season. He did not appear much for the club in his first Serie A season, and made his Serie A debut on 27 February 2005, as a starter against Atalanta BC. The match ended in a 3–3 draw. Following his debut, he played in just two more games for the entire season. Following an entire season in Serie A, that saw the left-sided defender make just three appearances, he was sold to another island club, Calcio Catania, ahead of the 2005–06 Serie B season. With this transfer, his first Serie A experience was very short-lived.

=== Catania ===
Calcio Catania officially announced the co-ownership transfer on 7 July 2005, and the player was imminently a part of the rossazzuri's season. He managed to make 23 league appearances and helped to guide the team to a very impressive second-place finish in the league table, and hence to Serie A promotion. In June 2006 Catania signed Sabato outright from Cagliari for an undisclosed fee.

Despite being a part of coach Pasquale Marino's plans during his first season in Sicily, the player was instantly loaned out prior to the new Serie A adventure. He was loaned back into the Italian Serie B, with A.C. Cesena for the 2006–07 campaign, for a fee of €75,000. It was a very successful loan spell, however, as the player was a fixture in the team's starting line-up for much of the season, making 32 league appearances, and also netting a goal.

Upon his return to Catania, following the expiration of the loan deal, Sabato remained in Sicily for the 2007–08 Serie A season, under coach Silvio Baldini. Under Baldini, the player was used often and made 19 appearances in the league, helping guide the team to salvation against relegation for the second consecutive season. Sabato again remained in Catania for the 2008–09 Serie A season, under another new coach, Walter Zenga. The left back was used just seven times, however, in the first portion of the season, and did manage his first Serie A goal, from a free kick, but he was still released as a free agent during the winter transfer market.

=== Empoli ===
On 30 January 2009, Sabato officially joined the second division club and instantly earned a starting position with the club. In the latter portion of the 2008–09 Serie B season, Sabato alone made an impressive 15 appearances. Despite a fairly good start to his adventure with Empoli, the player was surprisingly sold to fellow Serie B club, Triestina, on 14 July 2009.

=== Triestina ===
With Triestina, Sabato signed a two-year contract,, following his arrival in July 2009. In his first season with the Trieste based club, Sabato was a key figure in the team's starting line-up and made 33 Serie B appearances during the 2009–10 season. Despite his efforts, the club failed to avoid relegation, as they lost the play-off match versus Padova, following an 18th-place finish in the league table.

=== Sorrento ===
On 31 January 2011, he was transferred to Sorrento and went on to make 22 appearances.

== Outside of football ==
On 5 January 2005, Cagliari retired former club legend Luigi Riva's number 11 jersey to honour him and his achievements with the club; as the last holder of the number 11 shirt, Rocco Sabato presented Riva with his jersey in the club's official ceremony.
