= FC Francavilla =

Italian football club

F.C. Francavilla
- Full name: Football Club Francavilla
- Founded: 1931
- Ground: Stadio Nunzio Fittipaldi, Francavilla in Sinni, Italy
- Capacity: 1,200
- Chairman: Antonio Cupparo
- Manager: Nicola Ragno
- League: Serie D/H
- 2021–22: Serie D/H, 2nd
- Website: http://www.francavillafc.it/
Home colours	Away colours

Francavilla Football Club, also better known as FC Francavilla or Francavilla in Sinni or simply Francavilla, is an Italian football club based in the homonymous city of Francavilla in Sinni, in the province of Potenza.

Founded in 1931, the team has been affiliated with the FIGC since 1973 and currently plays the Serie D championship, a category in which it achieved second place in the 2021-2022 season as its best placement.

== History ==
=== Origins ===
The company was founded in 1931 with the name of Unione Sportiva Francavilla, playing friendly matches and regional tournaments until 1973, when the team affiliated with the FIGC and was taken by Giuseppe Sarubbi starting from the second category, where it finished with a seventh place. The following year he obtained first place and played in promotion (current Excellence). His first year of promotion ended with a 6th place. In the 1976–77 season, Francavilla relegated by finishing 13th. The following year he played a good championship by finishing third in the first category. The team is taken by Leopoldo Spaltra with whom Francavilla began a period of poor results.

=== The dark era with Spaltra and radiation ===
In the 1978–79 season the team finished 14th in the first category and was relegated to the second. The following year he withdrew from the championship, starting from the third category and changing his name to Polisportiva Francavilla. He arrived first and returned to the second category, where he remained for six seasons, from the 1981/1982 season to the 1986/1987 one, always touching the first category. Just in that season Antonio L'Amico took over and at the end the team was rescued after a third-place finish in the first category. The next three seasons were played in the first category. The third year he was disbarred.

=== The change of name and the happy years ===
After the radiation Francavilla restarted with a new name from the second category: Football Club Francavilla, which is the current name. The president was Felice Viceconte who remained only one season, the one he served at FC Francavillato be promoted back to the first category after a second-place finish. Then Antonio D'Angelo took over, who after a 3rd place in the first year, managed to get the team in first position, winning the promotion. The following year in the Promotion he finished with a third place that allowed Francavilla to return to the highest regional championship: excellence. In the 1995–96 season he finished the Excellence in 6th place, but the president D'Angelo left the command of the team to Nicola Nicolao who led it until 1998 always in Excellence for the third year in a row, closing the second year in 12th place and the third in 7th place.

=== The era of Excellence with Francesco Cupparo ===
After three years in Excellency, another president entered again, Francesco Cupparo. The season ended in 12th place, but the following ones were completely different. He finished second and almost failed to enter Serie D, the same thing in the following years, where he first lost the playoffs after another second place. He was offered a repechage in Serie D, but the team did not accept. It continued with excellence, another second place and another unsuccessful repechage. The following year it closed in third place. The year after a fourth-place finish. Finally the long-awaited turning point in the 2004–05 season: after the long stay in Excellence, he closed in 1st place obtaining the Serie D. In addition over the years in Excellence he reached the final of the Regional Italian Cup twice where he lost against Venosa and against Pisticci.

=== Serie D and the advent of Lazic ===
After the long-awaited Serie D, the team was saved in the play-outs with Trapani, after closing the season in 13th place. The following year a new coach arrived: Ranko Lazic. The team participated in the Serie D championship for the second consecutive season, finishing in 11th place with 46 points, winning the salvation on the penultimate day. The same thing the following year, finishing 8th and saving himself on the penultimate day with 45 points. In the fourth consecutive year in Serie D he obtained a 7th place with 47 points, always saving himself on the penultimate day. The fifth season ended with another 7th place at 55 points. In the last season he obtained the best result in these six years of Serie D, a good 6th place, close to the play-offs.

=== 2011–12 season and the new president Antonio Cupparo ===
The season began with the team with full points, after the 3–1 victory over Casertana and the one that ended 2–1 against Grottaglie. All 4 goals were scored by the striker and captain Genny Del Prete, who gave a great start to the championship to the new president Antonio Cupparo, son of the former patron Francesco Cupparo.

The most positive season in Serie D is undoubtedly that of the year 2015–16, when the Sinnici team ranks third in group H, and reaches a historic play-off final (lost 0–1 against Fondi).

At the end of the 2019–20 championship, fifteenth consecutive in Serie D, closed early due to the health emergency linked to the COVID-19 pandemic, the team relegates to Excellence but is later rescued to organic complements in Serie D.

In the 2021–22 season the coach, Ranko Lazic, after having reached and exceeded the 500 games at the helm of the club, ceases to be in charge and becomes sporting director. To replace Lazic comes the former coach of Potenza, Taranto and Bitonto Nicola Ragno. The following season Francavilla overcame all kinds of predictions and became winter champion, also thanks to the contribution of its best performing players, Antonio Croce and Angelo Nolé. In the final of the season, despite some unexpected defeats, Francavilla managed to win second place in the standings and consequently access to the play-offs thanks to a game-changing goal from home idol De Marco in the penultimate day against Bitonto. The 2021–22 season is FC Francavilla’s best performance in their entire history.

== Colours and badge ==
The team's colors are red and blue.

== Structures ==
The Nunzio Fittipaldi stadium hosts the matches of the Francavilla Football Club: located in Via Vigna Chiesa 6, it has a grassy surface, covered grandstand and a small separate sector, it has a capacity of about 1200 seats.

== Palmarès ==
=== Regional competitions ===
- Eccellenza

2004-2005

- Prima Categoria

1993-1994

- Seconda Categoria

1974-1975

- Terza Categoria

1980-1981

=== Other placings ===
- Serie D:

Second place: 2021-2022
Third place: 2015-2016

- Eccellenza:

Second place: 1999-2000, 2000-2001, 2001-2002
Third place: 2002-2003

- Promozione:

Third place: 1994-1995
