= Simone Guerri =

Italian footballer (born 1982)

Personal information
- Date of birth: 27 June 1982 (age 44)
- Place of birth: Arezzo, Italy
- Height: 1.81 m (5 ft 11 1/2 in)
- Position: Midfielder

Youth career
- Fiorentina

Senior career*
Years	Team	Apps	(Gls)
2002–2003	Florentia Viola	0	(0)
2003	Trento	2	(0)
2003	Montevarchi	2	(0)
2003–2004	Aglianese	30	(0)
2004–2005	Imolese	34	(2)
2005–2007	Castelnuovo	62	(5)
2007–2009	Pistoiese	55	(6)
2009–2010	Figline	33	(1)
2010–2012	Barletta	55	(2)
2012–2013	Gubbio	15	(4)
2013–2014	Torres	34	(3)
2014–2015	Gubbio	32	(2)
2015–2016	Paganese	30	(3)
2016–2018	Robur Siena	43	(1)

International career
1999	Italy U16	2	(0)
1999	Italy U17	1	(0)
- * Club domestic league appearances and goals as of 16 June 2018

Simone Guerri (born 27 June 1982) is an Italian footballer. He spent entire professional career in Serie C.

== Biography ==
Born in Arezzo, Tuscany, Guerri started his career at AC Fiorentina. After the club bankrupted, he remained in Florence as member of newly formed successor Florentia Viola (later ACF Fiorentina). In January 2003, he left for Trento. He then involved into a swap deals between Trento, Mantova and Montevarchi, which Guerri left for Montevarchi.

He then played for Aglianese, Imolese and Castelnuovo in Serie C2. In 2007, he was signed by Prima Divisione (Serie C1) team Pistoiese and left the club after the club went bankrupt. In 2009–10 season he played for another Prima Divisione team Figline but the team also bankrupted after the season.

In August 2010, he was signed by Barletta.

=== International career ===
He played for Italy U16 team (now Italy U17) at 1999 UEFA European Under-16 Football Championship qualifying. He also played once for Italy U17 (now U18), the feeder team of U18 (now Italy U19).
