= Gianluca Laurenti =

Italian footballer

Personal information
- Date of birth: 14 April 1990 (age 36)
- Place of birth: Ferrara, Italy
- Height: 1.82 m (6 ft 0 in)
- Position: Midfielder

Team information
- Current team: Luparense

Youth career
- SPAL

Senior career*
Years	Team	Apps	(Gls)
2007–2013	SPAL	68	(13)
2011–	→ Mezzocorona (loan)	13	(1)
2013–2015	Delta Rovigo	57	(15)
2015–2016	AltoVicentino	19	(4)
2016–2018	Bassano	54	(8)
2018–2019	LR Vicenza	30	(1)
2019–2021	Modena	26	(0)
2021–2022	Legnago	24	(1)
2022–	Luparense	0	(0)

International career^{‡}
2009	Italy U20	1	(0)
- * Club domestic league appearances and goals as of 21 December 2021 ‡ National team caps and goals as of 4 November 2009

Gianluca Laurenti (born 14 April 1990) is an Italian professional footballer who plays as a midfielder for Luparense.

== Club career ==
Born in Ferrara, Laurenti started his career in SPAL.

On 1 February 2016, he joined to Bassano.

Laurenti left Modena on 4 January 2021, and joined to Legnago the next day. On 18 January 2022, his contract with Legnago was terminated by mutual consent. On the same day, he joined Serie D club Luparense.
