= Raffaele Nolè =

Italian footballer (born 1984)

Personal information
- Full name: Angelo Raffaele Nolè
- Date of birth: 27 March 1984 (age 42)
- Place of birth: Potenza, Italy
- Height: 1.77 m (5 ft 9 1/2 in)
- Position: Forward

Senior career*
| Years | Team | Apps | (Gls) |
| 2001–2007 | Potenza | 155 | (35) |
| 2007–2010 | Rimini | 23 | (8) |
| 2007–2008 | → Messina (loan) | 7 | (0) |
| 2008–2009 | → Potenza (loan) | 28 | (4) |
| 2010–2014 | Ternana | 98 | (20) |
| 2014–2015 | Bassano | 31 | (11) |
| 2015–2016 | Reggiana | 41 | (7) |
| 2017 | Modena | 16 | (3) |
| 2017–2018 | Fondi | 31 | (8) |
| 2018–2019 | Pro Piacenza | 14 | (6) |
| 2019 | Virtus Verona | 13 | (0) |
| 2019–2024 | Francavilla | 0 | (0) |

Managerial career
- 2024–2025: Francavilla
- * Club domestic league appearances and goals

Angelo Raffaele Nolè (born 27 March 1984) is an Italian association football coach and former player in the role of forward.

== Playing career ==
Nolè began his career at his hometown club, Potenza SC, progressing from a non-professional to a professional level in 2004, the season in which the two Potenza clubs at the time agreed to merge. In July 2007, he was signed by the Serie B team Rimini but loaned to Messina, as the club had Daniele Vantaggiato, Jeda and Emilio Docente as forwards. In the next season he returned to Potenza and after Rimini was relegated in 2009, he returned there and played in 2009–10 Lega Pro Prima Divisione, scored 8 goals, ahead of other forwards such as Docente. Rimini failed to pass the financial test by the Commissione di Vigilanza sulle Società di Calcio Professionistiche (Co.Vi.So.C.) of the Italian Football Federation (FIGC) and was expelled from the professional league.

=== Ternana ===
In September 2010, Nolè was signed by Ternana. In July 2011, he renewed his contract with the club. After winning the promotion to Serie B, along with forward Davide Sinigaglia, they were offered an extension to their contract.

=== Lega Pro clubs ===
On 30 July 2014 Nolè was signed by Bassano. On 27 August 2015 he was signed by Reggiana in a two-year contract.

On 21 January 2017, he was transferred outright to Modena.

In 2019, he joined Serie D club Francavilla, with whom he retired in 2024.

== Coaching career ==
In the summer of 2024, Nolè was promoted to the role of head coach of Serie D club Francavilla. He departed by the end of the 2024–25 Serie D season.
