= Nicola Malaccari =

Italian footballer

Personal information
- Date of birth: 16 February 1992 (age 34)
- Place of birth: Jesi, Italy
- Height: 1.76 m (5 ft 9 in)
- Position: Midfielder

Team information
- Current team: Fermana
- Number: 21

Youth career
- –2010: Tolentino
- 2010–2012: Atalanta

Senior career*
| Years | Team | Apps | (Gls) |
| 2008–2010 | Tolentino | 29 | (3) |
| 2009–2010 | → Rimini (loan) | 3 | (0) |
| 2011–2012 | Atalanta | 0 | (0) |
| 2011–2012 | → Avellino (loan) | 22 | (1) |
| 2012–2014 | Gubbio | 41 | (3) |
| 2014–2015 | Savoia | 16 | (0) |
| 2015 | → Paganese (loan) | 17 | (0) |
| 2015–2016 | Lupa Roma | 25 | (0) |
| 2016–2017 | Maceratese | 35 | (1) |
| 2017–2022 | Gubbio | 139 | (6) |
| 2023–2024 | Brindisi | 43 | (1) |
| 2024– | Fermana | 10 | (0) |
- * Club domestic league appearances and goals as of 4 May 2024

Nicola Malaccari (born 16 February 1992) is an Italian professional footballer who plays as a midfielder for Eccellenza club Fermana.

== Club career ==
Born in Jesi, Malaccari started his career with Serie D club Tolentino. He made his senior debut on 2008–09 season. The next year, he was loaned to Serie C club Rimini, and he made his professional debut on 30 August 2009 against Reggiana.

He left Tolentino in 2011, and joined Atalanta youth sector. After a spell in Avellino, he signed for Gubbio in June 2013.

After a long journey with Serie C clubs, in 2017 he returned to Gubbio. Years after, he was named captain of the team.
