= Marco Piccinni =

Italian footballer

Personal information
- Date of birth: 19 April 1987 (age 39)
- Place of birth: Bari, Italy
- Height: 1.78 m (5 ft 10 in)
- Position: Midfielder

Youth career
- Bari

Senior career*
Years	Team	Apps	(Gls)
2006–2007	Bari	2	(0)
2006–2007	→ Pro Vasto (loan)	0	(0)
2007–2009	→ Noicattaro	61	(2)
2009–2012	Bari	0	(0)
2009–2010	→ Brindisi (loan)	27	(4)
2010–2011	→ Lucchese (loan)	27	(1)
2012	Piacenza	15	(0)
2012–2013	Barletta	18	(0)
2013–2014	Chieti	8	(0)
2014–2018	Fidelis Andria	107	(4)
2018–2019	Potenza	36	(2)
2019–2023	Monopoli	107	(8)
Total		408	(21)
- * Club domestic league appearances and goals

Marco Piccinni (born 19 April 1987) is an Italian former footballer who played as a midfielder.

== Career ==
Born in Bari, Italy, Piccinni started his career at hometown club A.S. Bari. After made his debut in the last rounds of 2005–06 Serie B (round 40 of 42 rounds season), he was loaned to Pro Vasto but returned in January 2007 for Bari youth team. He only played for Pro Vasto in 2006–07 Coppa Italia. He then sold to Noicattaro in co-ownership deal. In June 2009 he returned to Bari but in July left for Brindisi.

He failed to find a club to borrow him in 2011. He wore no.95 of Bari, which in recent years only players that excluded from the coach plan would wore "large" number in Bari. FIGC only allowed players to wear number from 1 to 99. Along with Conti (93), Langella (94), Statella (96), Rana (97) and Visconti (98), they were not part of the plan of Bari's first team. In January 2012, Piccinni left for Piacenza without a single appearance for Bari in 2011–12 Serie B season.

In 2012, he joined Barletta. On 13 August 2013 he joined Chieti.

In July 2014 Piccinni signed with the Serie D side Fidelis Andria. After winning the championship, he renewed his contract with Fidelis Andria by signing a 1-year deal, with option for a 2nd year, for the 2015-16 Lega Pro season. At the end of the season, he signed a new 1-year deal for season 2016-17 with Fidelis Andria.

On 2 September 2019, he signed a 2-year contract with Monopoli.
