= Manuel Mancini (footballer) =

Italian footballer

Personal information
- Date of birth: 26 August 1983 (age 43)
- Place of birth: Rome, Italy
- Height: 1.80 m (5 ft 11 in)
- Position: Midfielder

Youth career
- ?–2003: Lazio

Senior career*
Years	Team	Apps	(Gls)
2003–2005	South Tyrol	20	(3)
2005–2008	Taranto	55	(10)
2008–2010	Siena	0	(0)
2009–2010	→ Gallipoli (loan)	38	(4)
2010–2012	Verona	35	(2)
2012–2014	Salernitana	43	(4)
2014–2016	L'Aquila	49	(4)
2015	→ Messina (loan)	16	(0)
2016–2017	Messina	26	(1)
- * Club domestic league appearances and goals as of 22 November 2017

Manuel Mancini (born 27 June 1983) is an Italian footballer who last played for Messina.

== Biography ==
=== Siena ===
Although he was never utilized in league play, he was a member of Siena squad in 2008–09 Serie A. He was signed from Taranto Sport in January 2008 along with Antonio Zito. They remained in Taranto until 30 June 2008. The transfer cost Siena €50,000 (Mancini) and €207,000 (Zito) respectively.

He made his Serie B debut with Gallipoli in the 2009–10 season.

=== Verona ===
Mancini was sold to Hellas Verona F.C. in a co-ownership deal for €2,000 on 15 July 2010. Mancini made his debut in a friendly match on 18 July.

In 2010–11 he was a key player for Verona squad that was promoted to Serie B after four seasons in Lega Pro Prima Divisione. In June 2011 Verona acquired Mancini outright for a nominal fee of €500.

On 13 February 2012 Mancini extended his contract to 30 June 2014.

=== Salernitana ===
On 31 August 2012 he moved on loan to the Lega Pro Seconda Divisione club Salernitana.

He was released by Verona on 30 August 2013 On 13 November he re-joined Salernitana.

=== L'Aquila ===
In summer 2014 Mancini was signed by L'Aquila. On 5 January 2015 Mancini was signed by Messina in a temporary deal. He received pre-season call-up for L'Aquila in 2015–16 season.

=== Messina ===
On 9 September 2016 Mancini re-joined Messina.
