= Gianluca Urbinati =

Italian footballer

Personal information
- Date of birth: 27 September 1987 (age 39)
- Place of birth: Fano, Italy
- Height: 1.88 m (6 ft 2 in)
- Position: Midfielder

Team information
- Current team: Fano

Senior career*
Years	Team	Apps	(Gls)
2006–2007	Cattolica	24	(1)
2007	Gubbio	2	(0)
2007–2008	Urbino Calcio	12	(0)
2008–2009	Pergocrema	32	(6)
2009–2010	Rio Salso	34	(4)
2010–2012	Fano	29	(1)
2012–2013	Vis Pesaro	6	(0)
2013	Todi Calcio	17	(1)
2013	Marotta	0	(0)
2013–2014	Urbania	22	(5)
2014–2015	Castelfidardo	32	(0)
2015–2022	Fermana	184	(11)
2022	Pistoiese	14	(0)
2022–	Fano	33	(2)
- * Club domestic league appearances and goals as of 20 December 2023

Gianluca Urbinati (born 27 September 1987) is an Italian professional footballer who plays as a midfielder for Eccellenza Marche club Fano.

== Club career ==
Urbinati started his career in Cattolica. He played on amateurs divisions in Italy.

On 13 July 2015 he joined Serie D club Fermana. Urbinati made his professional debut for Serie C, late on 27 August 2017 against Ravenna. He extended his contract in May 2019. He was named team captain.

On 29 August 2022, Urbinati moved to Pistoiese in Serie D.
