= Stefano Pellini =

Italian footballer

Personal information
- Date of birth: 6 August 1997 (age 29)
- Place of birth: Cittiglio, Italy
- Height: 1.75 m (5 ft 9 in)
- Position: Midfielder

Youth career
- Legnano
- Pro Patria
- Varese
- 2011−2016: Juventus

Senior career*
Years	Team	Apps	(Gls)
2016–2017	Juventus	0	(0)
2016–2017	→ Tuttocuoio (loan)	25	(0)
2017–2018	Cuneo	18	(1)
2018–2019	San Marino	6	(0)
2019	Milano City	12	(0)
2019–2020	Varesina		
2020–2021	Legnano	22	(0)
2021–2023	Solbiatese		
2023–2024	AC Ardor Lazzate 1973		
2024–2025	Sestese		
2025–2026	Legnano		
Total		83	(1)
- * Club domestic league appearances and goals

Stefano Pellini (born 6 August 1997) is an Italian former professional footballer who plays as a midfielder.

== Early career ==
Pellini was born in the Lombard town of Cittiglio, and began his career in the youth teams of Legnano, Pro Patria and Varese. In 2011, he signed an amateur contract with Italian giants Juventus at the age of thirteen. Pellini progressed through the youth teams, eventually moving from the under-17 team to the under-19 team in 2014. He soon became a regular feature in the Primavera side under coach Fabio Grosso, playing in the Campionato Nazionale Primavera and Coppa Italia Primavera.

=== Tuttocuoio ===
In June 2016, Pellini was loaned to Lega Pro side Tuttocuoio for one year. He made his professional debut against Casertana on 31 July 2016, playing 120 minutes including extra time and scoring in a 3–2 loss. His league debut came less than a month later, again starting in central midfield and playing the full game in a 2–2 draw away at Prato.

=== Serie D ===
On 18 September 2018 he joined San Marino in Serie D.

In August 2019, Pellini joined Milano City.

=== Eccellenza ===
In December 2019, Pellini moved to Eccellenza club A.S.D. Varesina.
