= Alessio Benedetti =

Italian footballer (born 1990)

Personal information
- Date of birth: 19 May 1990 (age 36)
- Place of birth: Assisi, Italy
- Height: 1.83 m (6 ft 0 in)
- Position: Midfielder

Team information
- Current team: Flaminia

Youth career
- –2009: Milan

Senior career*
| Years | Team | Apps | (Gls) |
| 2009–2010 | Orvietana | 12 | (1) |
| 2010–2012 | Perugia | 58 | (6) |
| 2012–2014 | Catanzaro | 54 | (2) |
| 2014–2015 | Cittadella | 31 | (0) |
| 2015–2016 | Cremonese | 6 | (0) |
| 2016 | → Arezzo (loan) | 14 | (0) |
| 2016–2017 | Pistoiese | 36 | (2) |
| 2017–2018 | Catanzaro | 18 | (1) |
| 2018 | Viterbese | 15 | (0) |
| 2018–2020 | Gubbio | 47 | (0) |
| 2020–2021 | Paganese | 8 | (0) |
| 2021 | Ravenna | 12 | (0) |
| 2021 | Tiferno Lerchi | 13 | (2) |
| 2021–2022 | Arezzo | 18 | (1) |
| 2022–2023 | United Riccione | 29 | (5) |
| 2023– | Flaminia | 5 | (0) |
- * Club domestic league appearances and goals as of 8 October 2023

Alessio Benedetti (born 19 May 1990) is an Italian footballer who plays as a midfielder for Serie D club Flaminia.

== Club career ==
Born in Assisi, the Province of Perugia, Umbria region, Benedetti started his career at Milan as a trainee: he was a member of the under-17 team in 2006–07 as well as the reserve B mainly for under-18 players in 2007–08 season. Benedetti left for Umbrian club Orvietana for 2009–10 Serie D. In the next season he was signed by re-established Perugia for 2010–11 Serie D. Benedetti won the champion of Group E as well as the grand runner-up of the fifth division, losing to Cuneo of Group A. Benedetti made 32 out of possible 42 appearances in 2011–12 Lega Pro Seconda Divisione. Benedetti missed 3 games due to suspensions, as he was booked 11 times. He also won the 2012 Supercoppa di Lega di Seconda Divisione. Despite included in the pre-season camp of Perugia, On 31 August 2012 Benedetti was signed by Catanzaro.

On 30 June 2014 Benedetti was signed by Cittadella.

On 8 July 2015 Benedetti was signed by Cremonese.

On 6 January 2016, he signed a loan contract with Arezzo until 30 June 2016.

In the summer of 2016 Benedetti was signed by Pistoiese in a 1-year contract.

On 28 September 2020 he joined Paganese.

On 1 February 2021 he signed with Ravenna until the end of the 2020–21 season.

On 20 August 2021 he moved to Serie D club Tiferno Lerchi.
