= Emilio Docente =

Italian footballer (born 1983)

Personal information
- Full name: Emilio Benito Docente
- Date of birth: 11 December 1983 (age 42)
- Place of birth: Comiso, Italy
- Height: 1.78 m (5 ft 10 in)
- Position: Forward

Senior career*
Years	Team	Apps	(Gls)
2000–2003	Gela	40	(13)
2003	Messina	8	(1)
2003–2010	Rimini	123	(22)
2005–2006	→ Avellino (loan)	6	(0)
2006	→ Sambenedettese (loan)	11	(3)
2006–2007	→ Ancona (loan)	31	(12)
2010	→ Perugia (loan)	10	(2)
2010–2011	Gela	26	(6)
2011–2012	Ternana	29	(1)
2012–2013	Trapani	27	(7)
2013–2014	Forlì	52	(20)
- * Club domestic league appearances and goals as of 27 September 2013

Emilio Benito Docente (born 11 December 1983) is an Italian footballer.

He spent entire career in Italian lower divisions, from Serie B to Seconda Divisione, and mostly in Prima Divisione (second, fourth and third highest level)

== Biography ==
Born in Sicily, Docente was a product of Gela's academy. In January 2003 he was signed by Serie B team Messina. After the season, he was sold to Rimini in co-ownership deal, where he scored 12 Serie C1 goals in 2 seasons, winning Serie C1 Group B in 2005. In June 2005 Rimini bought the remain 50% registration rights from Messina and on 31 August loaned to fellow Serie B for Avellino. In January 2006 he returned to Italian third level, for Sambenedettese. He spent 2006–07 Serie C1 at Ancona. Docente returned to the city of Rimini on 1 July 2007, replacing departed Alessandro Matri as the third striker of the team, behind Daniele Vantaggiato and Jeda (Giuseppe Greco since January). He only made 1 start in 17 Serie B appearances. In the next season Greco departed at the start of season and Vantaggiato in January 2009, which Docente had more chance to play. The team had poorer attack and defence than previous season, slipped from the 7th to 18th and relegated. Docente scored 6 Serie B, the highest among his Serie B seasons.

Docente added 12 more league matches to his Rimini career before left on loan to fellow Prima Divisione team Perugia. Despite both teams finished as mid-team (losing side of promotion playoffs and 11th respectively), both team failed to pass financial tests and expelled from professional league.

On 29 August 2010 he was re-signed by Gela. After Gela also failed to pass the licensing criteria, he joined Ternana in 1-year deal, rejoining former Rimini teammate Raffaele Nolè. He won promotion to Serie B. On 19 July 2012 he was signed by Trapani Calcio; winning promotion to Serie B again.

== Honours ==
- Serie C1: 2005, 2012, 2013
