= Antonio Zito =

Italian footballer (born 1986)

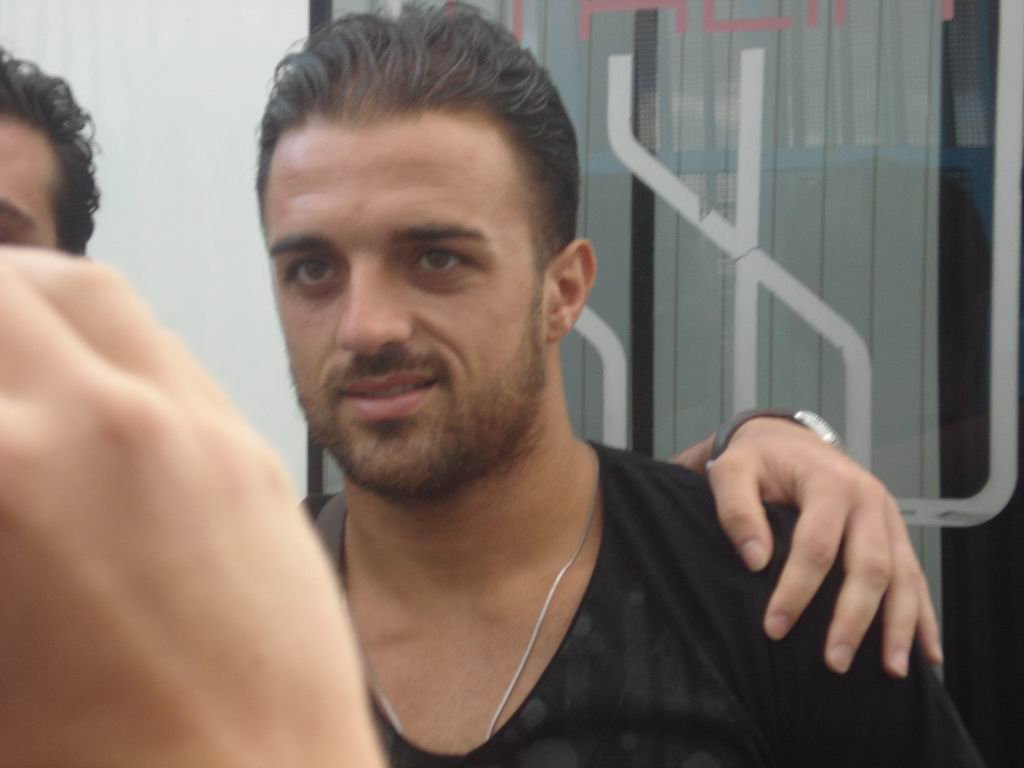

Personal information
- Date of birth: 6 June 1986 (age 40)
- Place of birth: Naples, Italy
- Height: 1.84 m (6 ft 0 in)
- Position: Left back

Team information
- Current team: Nola

Senior career*
Years	Team	Apps	(Gls)
2003–2006	Sorrento	52	(17)
2006–2008	Taranto	46	(7)
2008–2011	Siena	3	(0)
2009–2010	→ Crotone (loan)	17	(3)
2010–2011	→ Benevento (loan)	27	(0)
2011–2013	Juve Stabia	55	(5)
2013–2014	Ternana	26	(3)
2014–2016	Avellino	45	(3)
2016–2018	Salernitana	65	(4)
2018–2020	Casertana	49	(3)
2020–2021	Picerno	15	(2)
2021–2022	Paganese	16	(0)
2022–	Nola	2	(0)
- * Club domestic league appearances and goals as of 16 February 2022

Antonio Zito (born 6 June 1986) is an Italian former footballer who played for Nola.

== Biography ==
=== Sorrento ===
Zito started his career at Sorrento of Serie D. Which is within the province of Naples.

=== Taranto ===
He then signed by Taranto Sport of Serie C1.

=== Siena ===
In January 2008, he was signed by Siena of Serie A, along with Manuel Mancini, for €207,000 and €50,000 respectively, which they remained at Taranto until the end of season. Zito made his Serie A debut on 25 January 2009 against Atalanta, substituted Emanuele Calaiò in 84 minute. Zito played the hold second half on 24 May and played the first half at starter on 31 May, the last match of Serie A.

In July 2009, he was loaned to Crotone which newly promoted to Serie B, with option to purchase.

=== Juve Stabia ===
On 6 July 2011 he was released by Siena. Zito joined S.S. Juve Stabia in the same transfer windows.

=== Ternana ===
On 29 July 2013 he was signed by Ternana.

=== Avellino ===
On 11 July 2014 he was signed by Avellino in a 3-year contract.

=== Salernitana ===
On 8 January 2016 Zito was signed by Salernitana in a 2 1/2-year contract.

=== Picerno ===
On 30 September 2020 he moved to Serie D club Picerno.

=== Paganese ===
On 18 August 2021, he signed with Paganese.
