= Manuel Scalise =

Italian footballer and coach

Personal information
- Date of birth: 28 August 1981 (age 45)
- Place of birth: Rho, Italy
- Height: 1.81 m (5 ft 11 1/2 in)
- Positions: Right midfielder; right wing-back

Youth career
- 1998–1999: Saronno

Senior career*
Years	Team	Apps	(Gls)
1999–2003	Brescello	33	(1)
2000–2001	→ Legnago Salus (loan)	4	(0)
2003–2004	Montevarchi	23	(1)
2004–2006	Sangiovannese	34	(0)
2006	Grosseto	5	(0)
2007	Pavia	11	(1)
2007–2008	Lucchese	20	(0)
2008	Alessandria	5	(0)
2009–2010	Olbia	42	(1)
2010–2011	Nocerina	50	(0)
2012–2014	Ascoli	70	(4)
2014	Salernitana	10	(0)
2014–2016	Mantova	34	(0)
2016–2017	Cosenza	5	(0)

Managerial career
- 2019–2020: Borgo San Donnino
- 2020–2021: Club Milano
- 2021–2022: Caronnese
- 2022: Piacenza
- * Club domestic league appearances and goals as of 23 March 2013

Manuel Scalise (born 28 August 1981) is an Italian football coach and former professional footballer who played as a defender or midfielder. He was most recently the head coach of Piacenza.

== Playing career ==
He played in the minor leagues with Saronno, Brescello, Legnago Salus, Montevarchi, Sangiovannese, Grosseto, Pavia, Lucchese, Alessandria and Olbia.

In July 2010 he went to Nocerina, who at the end of the season was promoted to Serie B.

The following year he played 18 games with the Campanians and in January 2012 moved to Ascoli, where he collected 18 more appearances in the second league, scoring a goal.

On 23 January 2014 signed a contract with Salernitana, and 28 August 2014, is sold outright to Mantova. In October 2016 he signed for Cosenza.

== Coaching career ==
After retiring following a season at Cosenza, Scalise stayed under contract with the Calabrian side as a youth coach. In December 2019, he took on his first head coaching role at Eccellenza amateurs Borgo San Donnino. In 2020 he moved to Club Milano, another Eccellenza club.

In 2021, Scalise left Club Milano for Serie D club Caronnese, leading them to seventh place in the 2021–22 Serie D season.

On 1 June 2022, Serie C club Piacenza announced to have hired Scalise as their new head coach on a two-year deal, effective from the start of the 2022–23 season. On 2 October 2022, he was sacked after a dismal start in the club's campaign, leaving Piacenza at the bottom of the league table.
