= Nicola Ciccone (footballer) =

Italian football player

Personal information
- Date of birth: 21 April 1996 (age 30)
- Place of birth: Crema, Italy
- Height: 1.80 m (5 ft 11 in)
- Position: Forward

Team information
- Current team: Chievo
- Number: 10

Youth career
- –2014: Cremonese
- 2013–2014: → Sampdoria (loan)

Senior career*
Years	Team	Apps	(Gls)
2014–2018	Cremonese	26	(0)
2016–2017	→ Messina (loan)	7	(0)
2017–2018	→ Gubbio (loan)	32	(2)
2018–2019	Catanzaro	33	(3)
2019–2021	Pergolettese	33	(3)
2021	Virtus Francavilla	16	(3)
2021–2022	Legnago	11	(0)
2022	Cerignola	12	(1)
2022	Sant'Angelo	9	(1)
2022–2023	Prato	20	(2)
2023–2025	Pro Palazzolo	65	(8)
2025–2026	Vado	33	(10)
2026–	Chievo	0	(0)

International career
2014	Italy U-18	1	(0)
- * Club domestic league appearances and goals as of 25 June 2026

Nicola Ciccone (born 21 April 1996) is an Italian footballer who plays for Serie D club Chievo.

== Club career ==
He made his Serie C debut for Cremonese on 20 September 2014 in a game against Südtirol.

On 13 July 2019, he signed with Pergolettese.

On 14 January 2021, he moved to Virtus Francavilla.

On 10 September 2021, he joined to Legnago Salus. On 27 January 2022, his contract with Legnago was terminated by mutual consent.

On 26 July 2022, Ciccone moved to Sant'Angelo in Serie D.
