= Francesco Di Nolfo =

Italian football player

Personal information
- Date of birth: 4 July 1998 (age 28)
- Place of birth: Rome, Italy
- Height: 1.80 m (5 ft 11 in)
- Position: Forward

Team information
- Current team: Pistoiese

Youth career
- –2016: Roma
- 2016: → Perugia (loan)

Senior career*
| Years | Team | Apps | (Gls) |
| 2016–2018 | Perugia | 5 | (0) |
| 2017–2018 | → Prato (loan) | 1 | (0) |
| 2018–2019 | Cavese | | |
| 2019–2020 | Falaschelavinio | | |
| 2020–2022 | Atletico Lodigiani | | |
| 2022–2024 | Trestina | 46 | (13) |
| 2024–2026 | Renate | 27 | (2) |
| 2026– | Pistoiese | 0 | (0) |

International career^{‡}
| 2013 | Italy U-15 | 7 | (0) |
| 2013 | Italy U-16 | 3 | (0) |
| 2015 | Italy U-17 | 1 | (0) |
| 2015–2016 | Italy U-18 | 3 | (0) |
| 2016 | Italy U-19 | 1 | (0) |
- * Club domestic league appearances and goals as of 18 January 2026 ‡ National team caps and goals as of 14 December 2016

Francesco Di Nolfo (born 4 July 1998) is an Italian football player who plays for Serie D club Pistoiese.

== Club career ==
He made his professional debut in the Serie B for Perugia on 10 September 2016 in a game against Brescia.
