= Roberto Candido =

Italian footballer

Personal information
- Date of birth: 13 March 1993 (age 33)
- Place of birth: Monza, Italy
- Height: 1.67 m (5 ft 5 1/2 in)
- Position: Midfielder

Team information
- Current team: Saronno

Youth career
- –2012: Inter
- 2010–2011: → Sassuolo

Senior career*
Years	Team	Apps	(Gls)
2010–2011	Inter	0	(0)
2010–2011	→ Sassuolo (loan)	1	(0)
2012–2013	Südtirol	6	(0)
2013–2015	Monza	23	(3)
2014–2015	→ Pro Patria (loan)	35	(9)
2015–2017	Bassano	51	(7)
2017–2018	Padova	17	(2)
2018–2020	Rimini	49	(3)
2020-2021	Casatese Merate	24	(8)
2021–2022	Casale	24	(6)
2023	Città di Varese	11	(1)
2023–2025	Siena	20	(2)
2025–2026	Clodiense	14	(3)
2026–	Saronno	20	(4)
- * Club domestic league appearances and goals as of 22 June 2026

Roberto Candido (born 13 March 1993) is an Italian football player who plays for Eccellenza club Saronno.

== Club career ==
He made his Serie B debut for Sassuolo on 27 March 2011 in a game against Siena.

On 9 July 2015 Bassano announced to have signed him on a free transfer.
