= Francesco Bontà =

Italian footballer

Personal information
- Date of birth: 14 May 1993 (age 33)
- Place of birth: Giulianova, Italy
- Height: 1.80 m (5 ft 11 in)
- Position: Midfielder

Youth career
- –2011: Giulianova
- 2011: → Reggina (loan)

Senior career*
Years	Team	Apps	(Gls)
2010–2011	Giulianova	45	(1)
2011–2015	Reggina	0	(0)
2012–2013	→ Südtirol (loan)	11	(0)
2013–2014	→ Castel Rigone (loan)	20	(1)
2015–2016	Campobasso	19	(0)
2016–2017	Jesina	31	(2)
2017	Monticelli	14	(0)
2017–2018	Notaresco Calcio	18	(2)
2018–2019	SN Notaresco	35	(7)
2019–2022	Campobasso	85	(17)
2022–2023	Gubbio	21	(1)
2023–2024	Sambenedettese	11	(0)
- * Club domestic league appearances and goals as of 5 May 2024

Francesco Bontà (born 14 May 1993) is an Italian professional footballer who plays as a midfielder.

== Career ==
Born in Giulianova, Bontà started his career in local club Real Giulianova. He made his professional debut in Lega Pro on 9 May 2010 against Rimini.

On 6 September 2017, he moved to Serie D club Monticelli Calcio.

On 23 July 2019, he returned to Campobasso. In August 2020, he extended his contract with the club. He was named team captain.

On 16 July 2022, Bontà signed a two-year contract with Gubbio.
