= 2015–16 Coppa Italia =

TIM Cup
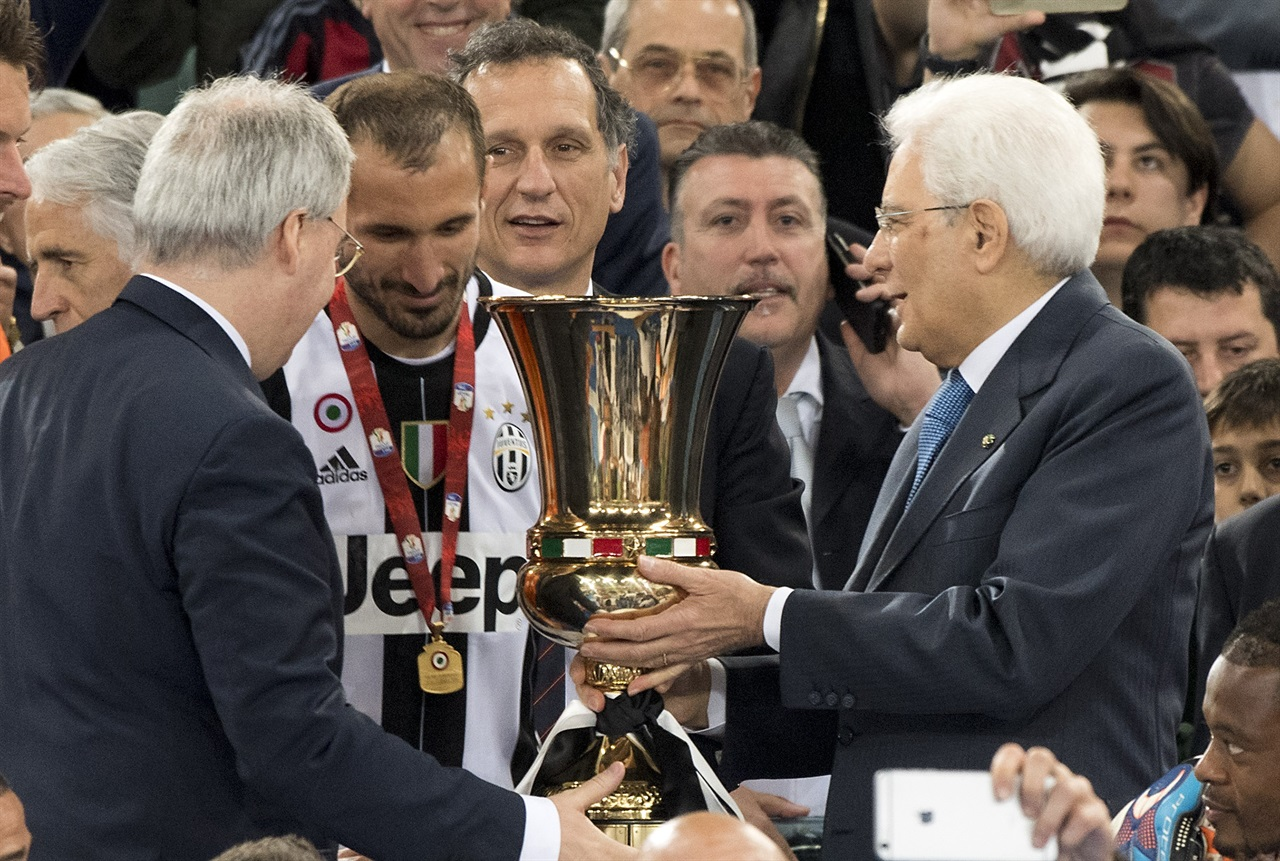

Tournament details
- Country: Italy
- Dates: 2 August 2015 – 21 May 2016
- Teams: 78

Final positions
- Champions: Juventus (11th title)
- Runners-up: Milan

Tournament statistics
- Matches played: 79
- Goals scored: 209 (2.65 per match)
- Top goal scorer: Giulio Bizzotto (5 goals)

The 2015–16 Coppa Italia, also known as TIM Cup for sponsorship reasons, was the 69th edition of the national domestic tournament. It began on 2 August 2015 and ended with the final match on 21 May 2016. Juventus successfully defended their title after beating Milan 1–0 by Morata's goal after extra time. This win secured them a record-extending eleventh cup title.

== Participating teams ==
=== Serie A (20 teams) ===
- Atalanta
- Bologna
- Carpi
- Chievo
- Empoli
- Fiorentina
- Frosinone
- Genoa
- Internazionale
- Juventus
- Lazio
- Milan
- Napoli
- Palermo
- Roma
- Sampdoria
- Sassuolo
- Torino
- Udinese
- Hellas Verona

=== Serie B (22 teams) ===
- Avellino
- Bari
- Cagliari
- Catania
- Cesena
- Como
- Crotone
- Latina
- Livorno
- Modena
- Novara
- Perugia
- Pescara
- Pro Vercelli
- Salernitana
- Spezia
- Teramo
- Ternana
- Trapani
- Vicenza
- Virtus Entella
- Virtus Lanciano

=== Lega Pro (27 teams) ===
- Alessandria
- Juve Stabia
- Bassano Virtus
- FeralpiSalò
- Lecce
- S.P.A.L.
- Matera
- Reggiana
- Casertana
- Benevento
- Foggia
- Pisa
- Ascoli
- L'Aquila
- Cittadella
- Ancona
- Brescia
- Pavia
- Cremonese
- Arezzo
- Cosenza
- Lucchese
- Tuttocuoio
- Südtirol
- Catanzaro
- Pontedera
- Melfi

=== Serie D (9 teams) ===
- Poggibonsi
- Viterbese
- Potenza
- Sestri Levante
- Lecco
- Delta Rovigo
- Rende
- Fano
- Altovicentino

source: legaseriea.it

== Format and seeding ==
Teams enter the competition at various stages, as follows:

- First phase (one-legged fixtures)
  - First round: 36 teams from Lega Pro and Serie D start the tournament
  - Second round: the 18 winners from the previous round are joined by the 22 Serie B teams
  - Third round: the 20 winners from the second round meet the 12 Serie A sides seeded 9-20
  - Fourth round: the 16 survivors face each other
- Second phase
  - Round of 16 (one-legged): the 8 fourth round winners are inserted into a bracket with the Serie A clubs seeded 1-8
  - Quarter-finals (one-legged)
  - Semi-finals (two-legged)
- Final (one-legged)

== Round dates ==
The schedule of each round is as follows:

Phase	Round	First leg	Second leg
Elimination	First round	2 August 2015	
Elimination	Second round	8–10 August 2015	
Elimination	Third round	14–20 August 2015	
Elimination	Fourth round	1–3 December 2015	
Final rounds	Round of 16	15–17 December 2015	
Final rounds	Quarter-Finals	13–20 January 2016	
Final rounds	Semi-finals	26–27 January 2016	1–2 March 2016
Final rounds	Final	21 May 2016	

== First stage ==
=== First round ===
A total of 36 teams from Lega Pro and Serie D competed in this round, 18 of which advanced to second round. The matches were played on 2 August 2015.

2 August 2015	L'Aquila (3)	2–0	Arezzo (3)	L'Aquila
20:30 CEST (UTC+2)	De Sousa 16'; Sanni 39'	Report		Stadium: Stadio Tommaso Fattori; Attendance: 578; Referee: Francesco Forneau

2 August 2015	Cittadella (3)	15–0	Potenza (4)	Cittadella
20:30 CEST (UTC+2)	Coralli 19', 41', 57'; Iori 25'; Bizzotto 31', 43', 54', 82'; Paolucci 61', 75'; Pascali 67', 69'; Bobb 78', 80'; Minesso 88'	Report		Stadium: Stadio Pier Cesare Tombolato; Attendance: 548; Referee: Luigi Rossi

2 August 2015	Matera (3)	0–1	Südtirol (3)	Matera
20:30 CEST (UTC+2)		Report	Kirilov 2'	Stadium: Stadio XXI Settembre - Franco Salerno; Attendance: 2,000; Referee: Pasquale Boggi

2 August 2015	S.P.A.L. (3)	1–0	Rende (4)	Ferrara
20:30 CEST (UTC+2)	Mora 4'	Report		Stadium: Stadio Paolo Mazza; Attendance: 2,400; Referee: Antonio Giua

2 August 2015	Lecce (3)	0–0 (3–2 p)	Catanzaro (3)	Lecce
21:00 CEST (UTC+2)		Report		Stadium: Stadio Via del Mare; Attendance: 5,345; Referee: Vito Mastrodonato
	Penalties
	Moscardelli (penalty missed); Rosafio (penalty scored); Lepore (penalty scored); Herrara (penalty scored); Abruzzese (penalty missed)		(penalty scored) Razzitti; (penalty scored) Maita; (penalty missed) Agnello; (penalty missed) Orchi; (penalty missed) Mancuso

2 August 2015	Benevento (3)	0–1	Tuttocuoio (3)	Benevento
20:30 CEST (UTC+2)			Tempesti 89'	Stadium: Stadio Ciro Vigorito; Attendance: 2,518; Referee: Carmine Di Ruberto

2 August 2015	Foggia (3)	2–1 (a.e.t.)	Lucchese (3)	Foggia
20:30 CEST (UTC+2)	Floriano 23', 100'	Report	Espeche 1'	Stadium: Stadio Pino Zaccheria; Attendance: 5,000; Referee: Antonio Di Martino

2 August 2015	Pavia (3)	3–0	Poggibonsi (4)	Pavia
18:00 CEST (UTC+2)	Malomo 16'; Cesarini 40'; La Camera 60'	Report		Stadium: Stadio Pietro Fortunati; Attendance: 1,025; Referee: Andrea Tardino

2 August 2015	Pisa (3)	4–0	Sestri Levante (4)	Pisa
18:00 CEST (UTC+2)	Montella 6'; Polverini 35'; Starita 39', 71'	Report		Stadium: Arena Garibaldi – Stadio Romeo Anconetani; Attendance: 1,200; Referee: Stefano Giovani

2 August 2015	Brescia (3)	0–0 (a.e.t.) (4–3 p)	Cremonese (3)	Brescia
20:30 CEST (UTC+2)		Report		Stadium: Stadio Mario Rigamonti; Attendance: 5,500; Referee: Marco Mainardi
	Penalties
	Somma (penalty scored); Mazzitelli (penalty scored); Dall'Oglio (penalty scored); Kupisz (penalty missed); Camilli (penalty scored)		(penalty scored) Brighenti; (penalty missed) Moroni; (penalty scored) Magnaghi; (penalty scored) Gargiulo; (penalty missed) Crialese

2 August 2015	Casertana (3)	1–0 (a.e.t.)	Lecco (4)	Caserta
18:00 CEST (UTC+2)	Adama Diakité 115'	Report		Stadium: Stadio Alberto Pinto; Attendance: 1,200; Referee: Giosue'Mauro D'Apice

2 August 2015	Juve Stabia (3)	2–0	Melfi (3)	Castellammare di Stabia
20:45 CEST (UTC+2)	Nicastro 40'; Gatto 61'	Report		Stadium: Stadio Romeo Menti; Attendance: 1,500; Referee: Livio Marinelli

2 August 2015	Alessandria (3)	2–0	Altovicentino (4)	Alessandria
18:00 CEST (UTC+2)	Fischnaller 3'; Loviso 7' (pen.)	Report		Stadium: Stadio Giuseppe Moccagatta; Attendance: 800; Referee: Pierantonio Perotti

2 August 2015	Reggiana (3)	3–0	Delta Rovigo (4)	Reggio Emilia
18:00 CEST (UTC+2)	Angiulli 3'; Siega 24'; Sinigaglia 88'	Report		Stadium: Mapei Stadium – Città del Tricolore; Attendance: 1,766; Referee: Fabio Schirru

2 August 2015	FeralpiSalò (3)	5–1	Fano (4)	Salò
19:00 CEST (UTC+2)	Guerra 18', 40', 62'; Maracchi 22'; Romero 90+3'		Borrelli 64'	Stadium: Stadio Lino Turina; Attendance: 450; Referee: Luca Massimi

2 August 2015	Bassano Virtus (3)	2–1	Pontedera (3)	Bassano del Grappa
20:30 CEST (UTC+2)	Pietribiasi 47', 61'	Report	Polvani 38'	Stadium: Stadio Rino Mercante; Attendance: 500; Referee: Alessandro Prontera

2 August 2015	Ascoli (3)	1–2	Cosenza (3)	Ascoli Piceno
21:00 CEST (UTC+2)	Tripoli 61'	Report	La Mantia 83'; Arrighini 90+4'	Stadium: Stadio Cino e Lillo Del Duca; Attendance: 2,454; Referee: Niccolo' Baroni

2 August 2015	Viterbese (4)	0–2	Ancona (3)	Ancona
17:00 CEST (UTC+2)			Bussi 61', 81'	Stadium: Stadio Del Conero; Attendance: 600; Referee: Armando Ranaldi

=== Second round ===
A total of 40 teams from Serie B and Lega Pro competed in the second round, 20 of which advanced to joining the 12 teams from Serie A in the third round. The matches were played between 8 and 10 August 2015.

8 August 2015	Livorno (2)	2–0 (a.e.t.)	Ancona (3)	Livorno
20:30 CEST (UTC+2)	Comi 106'; Vantaggiato 115'	Report		Stadium: Stadio Armando Picchi; Attendance: 2,450; Referee: Rosario Abisso

8 August 2015	Spezia (2)	1–0	Brescia (2)	La Spezia
20:30 CEST (UTC+2)	Piccolo 1'	Report		Stadium: Stadio Alberto Picco; Attendance: 4,659; Referee: Davide Ghersini

9 August 2015	Avellino (2)	3–0	Casertana (3)	Avellino
20:00 CEST (UTC+2)	Tavano 34'; Mokulu 72'; Trotta 77'	Report		Stadium: Stadio Partenio-Adriano Lombardi; Attendance: 6,000; Referee: Luigi Nasca

9 August 2015	Bari (2)	1–2	Foggia (3)	Bari
21:00 CEST (UTC+2)	Defendi 78'	Report	Gigliotti 57'; Floriano 65'	Stadium: Stadio San Nicola; Attendance: 14,733; Referee: Fabio Maresca

9 August 2015	Cagliari (2)	5–0	Virtus Entella (3)	Cagliari
21:00 CEST (UTC+2)	Melchiorri 31', 70'; Belli 34' (o.g.); Capuano 39'; Dessena 74'	Report		Stadium: Stadio Sant'Elia; Attendance: 6,000; Referee: Eugenio Abbattista

9 August 2015	Cesena (2)	4–0	Lecce (3)	Cesena
20:45 CEST (UTC+2)	Ragusa 13'; Alejandro Rodríguez 60', 75'; Molina 66'	Report		Stadium: Stadio Dino Manuzzi; Attendance: 4,426; Referee: Daniele Chiffi

9 August 2015	Crotone (2)	1–0	FeralpiSalò (3)	Crotone
20:45 CEST (UTC+2)	De Giorgio 45'			Stadium: Stadio Ezio Scida; Attendance: 3,429; Referee: Lorenzo Illuzzi

9 August 2015	Latina (2)	1–4	Pavia (3)	Latina
20:45 CEST (UTC+2)	Talamo 58'	Report	Bellazzini 56', 78'; Cesarini 77'; Malomo 80'	Stadium: Stadio Domenico Francioni; Attendance: 1,528; Referee: Daniele Martinelli

9 August 2015	Modena (2)	3–0	Tuttocuoio (3)	Santarcangelo di Romagna
17:00 CEST (UTC+2)	Granoche 7', 43', 73'			Stadium: Stadio Valentino Mazzola; Attendance: 417; Referee: Antonio Rapuano

9 August 2015	Novara (2)	5–0	L'Aquila (3)	Novara
20:30 CEST (UTC+2)	Signori 40'; Evacuo 49', 69'; Viola 60'; González 82'			Stadium: Stadio Silvio Piola; Attendance: 1,691; Referee: Gianluca Manganiello

9 August 2015	Perugia (2)	3–1	Reggiana (3)	Perugia
20:30 CEST (UTC+2)	Ardemagni 24', 48' (pen.); Lanzafame 72'	Report	Siega 21'	Stadium: Stadio Renato Curi; Attendance: 3,526; Referee: Luca Pairetto

9 August 2015	Pescara (2)	2–0	Südtirol (3)	Pescara
20:45 CEST (UTC+2)	Valoti 16'; Torreira 51'	Report		Stadium: Stadio Adriatico - Giovanni Cornacchia; Attendance: 4,434; Referee: Valerio Marini

9 August 2015	Pro Vercelli (2)	1–2	Alessandria (3)	Vercelli
20:30 CEST (UTC+2)	Ardizzone 37'	Report	Fischnaller 32'; Mezavilla 60'	Stadium: Stadio Silvio Piola; Attendance: 1,700; Referee: Marco Serra

9 August 2015	Salernitana (2)	1–0	Pisa (3)	Salerno
20:45 CEST (UTC+2)	Bovo 79'	Report		Stadium: Stadio Arechi; Attendance: 8,883; Referee: Juan Luca Sacchi

9 August 2015	Teramo (2)	0–2	Cittadella (3)	Teramo
19:00 CEST (UTC+2)		Report	Bizzotto 22'; Jallow 90+3'	Stadium: Stadio Gaetano Bonolis; Attendance: 1,465; Referee: Federico La Penna

9 August 2015	Ternana (2)	2–0	Bassano Virtus (3)	Terni
20:30 CEST (UTC+2)	Avenatti 2'; Dugandžić 87'	Report		Stadium: Stadio Libero Liberati; Attendance: 2,025; Referee: Ivan Pezzuto

9 August 2015	Trapani (2)	1–0	Como (2)	Trapani
20:30 CEST (UTC+2)	Perticone 90+3'	Report		Stadium: Stadio Polisportivo Provinciale; Attendance: 6,606; Referee: Daniele Minelli

9 August 2015	Vicenza (2)	1–1 (a.e.t.) (4–2 p)	Cosenza (3)	Vicenza
20:00 CEST (UTC+2)	Giacomelli 105' (pen.)	Report	Arrighini 91'	Stadium: Stadio Romeo Menti; Attendance: 1,462; Referee: Riccardo Ros
	Penalties
	Giacomelli (penalty scored); Vita (penalty scored); Urso (penalty scored); Mantovani (penalty scored)		(penalty scored) Arrighini; (penalty scored) Caccetta; (penalty missed) Arrigoni; (penalty missed) Ciancio

9 August 2015	Virtus Lanciano (2)	0–2	Juve Stabia (3)	Lanciano
20:00 CEST (UTC+2)			Gómez 22'; Gatto 90+3'	Stadium: Stadio Guido Biondi; Attendance: 1,446; Referee: Aleandro Di Paolo

10 August 2015	Catania (3)	3–0	S.P.A.L. (3)	Catania
20:30 CEST (UTC+2)		Report	Zigoni 59'	Stadium: Stadio Angelo Massimino; Attendance: 841; Referee: Francesco Paolo Saia
Note: The Italian Sports Court decided to award the match to Catania against SPAL as a 3–0 forfeit win after SPAL were found guilty of fielding an ineligible player (Mattia Finotto). The match originally ended 1–0 to S.P.A.L.

=== Third round ===
A total of 32 teams from Serie A, Serie B and Lega Pro competed in the third round, 16 of which advanced to the fourth round. The matches were played between 14 and 20 August 2015.

14 August 2015	Crotone (2)	1–0	Ternana (2)	Crotone
20:45 CEST (UTC+2)	Claiton 41'	Report		Stadium: Stadio Ezio Scida; Attendance: 4,328; Referee: Domenico Celi

14 August 2015	Bologna (1)	0–1	Pavia (3)	Vicenza
21:00 CEST (UTC+2)		Report	Del Sante 37'	Stadium: Stadio Romeo Menti; Attendance: 336; Referee: Michael Fabbri

15 August 2015	Empoli (1)	0–1	Vicenza (2)	Empoli
18:00 CEST (UTC+2)		Report	Gatto 54'	Stadium: Stadio Carlo Castellani; Attendance: 1,000; Referee: Angelo Cervellera

15 August 2015	Sassuolo (1)	2–0	Modena (2)	Reggio Emilia
20:30 CEST (UTC+2)	Falcinelli 53'; Floro Flores 66'	Report		Stadium: Mapei Stadium; Attendance: 2,329; Referee: Gianpaolo Calvarese

15 August 2015	Trapani (2)	1–1 (a.e.t.) (2–4 p)	Cagliari (2)	Trapani
20:30 CEST (UTC+2)	Montalto 39' (pen.)	Report	Deiola 11'	Stadium: Stadio Polisportivo Provinciale; Attendance: 7,182; Referee: Daniele Doveri
	Penalties
	Scozzarella (penalty scored); Raffaello (penalty missed); Coronado (penalty missed); Citro (penalty scored)		(penalty scored) Capuano; (penalty missed) Giannetti; (penalty scored) Deiola; (penalty scored) Sau; (penalty scored) Di Gennaro

15 August 2015	Hellas Verona (1)	3–1	Foggia (3)	Verona
20:30 CEST (UTC+2)	Hallfreðsson 23'; Toni 61'; Janković 79'	Report	Loiacono 18'	Stadium: Stadio Marc'Antonio Bentegodi; Attendance: 6,958; Referee: Fabricio Pasqua

15 August 2015	Alessandria (3)	1–0	Juve Stabia (3)	Alessandria
20:30 CEST (UTC+2)	Loviso 56'	Report		Stadium: Stadio Giuseppe Moccagatta; Attendance: 1,787; Referee: Daniele Minelli

15 August 2015	Atalanta (1)	3–0	Cittadella (3)	Bergamo
20:45 CEST (UTC+2)	De Roon 63'; Moralez 68'; Pinilla 78'	Report		Stadium: Stadio Atleti Azzurri d'Italia; Attendance: 5,833; Referee: Fabio Maresca

15 August 2015	Frosinone (1)	0–0 (a.e.t.) (5–6 p)	Spezia (2)	Frosinone
20:45 CEST (UTC+2)		Report		Stadium: Stadio Matusa; Attendance: 3,321; Referee: Carmine Russo
	Penalties
	Longo (penalty scored); Dionisi (penalty scored); Verde (penalty scored); Carlini (penalty missed); Chibsah (penalty scored); Crivello (penalty scored); Rosi (penalty missed)		(penalty scored) Brezovec; (penalty scored) Postigo; (penalty scored) Miguel; (penalty missed) Catellani; (penalty scored) Calaiò; (penalty scored) Chichizola; (penalty scored) Situm

15 August 2015	Palermo (1)	2–1	Avellino (2)	Palermo
21:00 CEST (UTC+2)	Rigoni 53'; Quaison 61'	Report	Trotta 60'	Stadium: Stadio Renzo Barbera; Attendance: 9,479; Referee: Claudio Gavilluci

16 August 2015	Udinese (1)	3–1	Novara (2)	Udine
18:30 CEST (UTC+2)	Guilherme 29'; Théréau 31'; Edenílson 78'	Report	Buzzegoli 73'	Stadium: Stadio Friuli; Attendance: 9,000; Referee: Daniele Chiffi

16 August 2015	Carpi (1)	2–0 (a.e.t.)	Livorno (2)	Carpi
20:30 CEST (UTC+2)	Matos 108', 116'	Report		Stadium: Stadio Sandro Cabassi; Attendance: 1,365; Referee: Andrea Gervasoni

16 August 2015	Torino (1)	4–1	Pescara (2)	Turin
21:15 CEST (UTC+2)	Baselli 27'; Acquah 33'; López 67'; Martínez 73'	Report	Ichazo 17' (o.g.)	Stadium: Stadio Olimpico di Torino; Attendance: 1,228; Referee: Davide Massa

17 August 2015	Chievo (1)	0–1 (a.e.t.)	Salernitana (2)	Verona
19:00 CEST (UTC+2)		Report	Bovo 120'	Stadium: Stadio Marc'Antonio Bentegodi; Attendance: 1,500; Referee: Piero Giacomelli

17 August 2015	Milan (1)	2–0	Perugia (2)	Milan
21:00 CEST (UTC+2)	Honda 10'; Luiz Adriano 28'	Report		Stadium: San Siro; Attendance: 23,683; Referee: Massimiliano Irrati

20 August 2015	Catania (3)	1–4	Cesena (2)	Catania
20:30 CEST (UTC+2)	Ramos 43'	Report	Bacchetti 22' (o.g.); Đurić 61'; Ciano 65', 67'	Stadium: Stadio Angelo Massimino; Attendance: 3,644; Referee: Maurizio Mariani

=== Fourth round ===
Fourth round matches were played between 1 and 3 December 2015.

1 December 2015	Spezia (2)	2–0	Salernitana (2)	La Spezia
15:00 CET (UTC+1)	Calaio 13'; Postigo 33'	Report		Stadium: Stadio Alberto Picco; Attendance: 2,256; Referee: Angelo Cervellera

1 December 2015	Torino (1)	4–1	Cesena (2)	Turin
18:00 CET (UTC+1)	Gazzi 3'; Moretti 13'; López 51'; Benassi 84'	Report	Cascione 68'	Stadium: Stadio Olimpico di Torino; Attendance: 4,962; Referee: Maurizio Mariani

1 December 2015	Milan (1)	3–1 (a.e.t.)	Crotone (2)	Milan
21:00 CET (UTC+1)	Luiz Adriano 47'; Bonaventura 105+1'; Niang 115'	Report	Budimir 68'	Stadium: San Siro; Attendance: 10,229; Referee: Michael Fabbri

2 December 2015	Palermo (1)	2–3	Alessandria (3)	Palermo
15:00 CET (UTC+1)	Trajkovski 55'; Gilardino 85'	Report	Loviso 4' (pen.); Marconi 23'; Nicco 82'	Stadium: Stadio Renzo Barbera; Attendance: 5,376; Referee: Luigi Nasca

2 December 2015	Hellas Verona (1)	1–0	Pavia (3)	Verona
18:00 CET (UTC+1)	Cláudio Winck 90+1'	Report		Stadium: Stadio Marc'Antonio Bentegodi; Attendance: 2,373; Referee: Eugenio Abbattista

2 December 2015	Udinese (1)	3–1	Atalanta (1)	Udine
21:00 CET (UTC+1)	Di Natale 5' (pen.), 76'; Perica 57'	Report	Monachello 48'	Stadium: Stadio Friuli; Attendance: 2,000; Referee: Riccardo Pinzani

3 December 2015	Carpi (1)	2–1	Vicenza (2)	Modena
18:00 CET (UTC+1)	Matos 47'; Borriello 61' (pen.)	Report	Gatto 75'	Stadium: Stadio Alberto Braglia; Attendance: 600; Referee: Gianluca Manganiello

3 December 2015	Sassuolo (1)	0–1	Cagliari (2)	Reggio Emilia
21:00 CET (UTC+1)		Report	Sau 36'	Stadium: Mapei Stadium – Città del Tricolore; Attendance: 2,071; Referee: Claudio Gavillucci

== Final stage ==
=== Bracket ===
Round of 16
Roma (1)	0 (2)
Spezia (2) (p)	0 (4)
Genoa (1)	1
Alessandria (3) (aet)	2
Sampdoria (1)	0
Milan (1)	2
Fiorentina (1)	0
Carpi (1)	1
Lazio (1)	2
Udinese (1)	1
Juventus (1)	4
Torino (1)	0
Napoli (1)	3
Hellas Verona (1)	0
Internazionale (1)	3
Cagliari (2)	0

Quarter-finals
Spezia	1
Alessandria	2
Milan	2
Carpi	1
Lazio	0
Juventus	1
Napoli	0
Internazionale	2

Semi-finals
Alessandria	0	0	0
Milan	1	5	6
Juventus (p)	3	0	3 (5)
Internazionale	0	3	3 (3)

Final
Milan	0
Juventus (aet)	1

==== Round of 16 ====
Round of 16 were played between 15 and 17 December 2015.

15 December 2015	Genoa (1)	1–2 (a.e.t.)	Alessandria (3)	Genoa
19:15 CET (UTC+1)	Pavoletti 90'	Report	Marras 46'; Bocalon 114'	Stadium: Stadio Luigi Ferraris; Attendance: 6,973; Referee: Luca Banti

15 December 2015	Internazionale (1)	3–0	Cagliari (2)	Milan
21:00 CET (UTC+1)	Palacio 24'; Brozović 71'; Perišić 81'	Report		Stadium: San Siro; Attendance: 17,102; Referee: Carmine Russo

16 December 2015	Roma (1)	0–0 (a.e.t.) (2–4 p)	Spezia (2)	Rome
15:30 CET (UTC+1)		Report		Stadium: Stadio Olimpico; Attendance: 7,167; Referee: Marco Di Bello
	Penalties
	Pjanić (penalty missed); Džeko (penalty missed); De Rossi (penalty scored); Digne (penalty scored)		(penalty scored) Terzi; (penalty scored) Nenê; (penalty scored) Juande; (penalty scored) Acampora

16 December 2015	Fiorentina (1)	0–1	Carpi (1)	Florence
16:30 CET (UTC+1)		Report	Di Gaudio 76'	Stadium: Stadio Artemio Franchi; Attendance: 8,257; Referee: Andrea Gervasoni

16 December 2015	Napoli (1)	3–0	Hellas Verona (1)	Naples
19:00 CET (UTC+1)	El Kaddouri 4'; Mertens 12'; Callejón 75'	Report		Stadium: Stadio San Paolo; Attendance: 7,221; Referee: Massimiliano Irrati

16 December 2015	Juventus (1)	4–0	Torino (1)	Turin
20:45 CET (UTC+1)	Zaza 28', 51'; Dybala 73'; Pogba 82'	Report		Stadium: Juventus Stadium; Attendance: 27,898; Referee: Daniele Doveri

17 December 2015	Lazio (1)	2–1	Udinese (1)	Rome
17:00 CET (UTC+1)	Matri 70'; Cataldi 79'	Report	Kone 67'	Stadium: Stadio Olimpico; Attendance: 1,970; Referee: Antonio Damato

17 December 2015	Sampdoria (1)	0–2	Milan (1)	Genoa
21:00 CET (UTC+1)		Report	Niang 50'; Bacca 90+3'	Stadium: Stadio Luigi Ferraris; Attendance: 11,200; Referee: Domenico Celi

==== Quarter-finals ====
Quarter-finals were played between 13 and 20 January 2016.

13 January 2016	Milan (1)	2–1	Carpi (1)	Milan
20:45 CET (UTC+1)	Bacca 14'; Niang 29'	Report	Mancosu 50'	Stadium: San Siro; Attendance: 12,319; Referee: Gianpaolo Calvarese

18 January 2016	Spezia (2)	1–2	Alessandria (3)	La Spezia
20:45 CET (UTC+1)	Calaiò 20' (pen.)	Report	Bocalon 83', 90'	Stadium: Stadio Alberto Picco; Attendance: 9,108; Referee: Paolo Tagliavento

19 January 2016	Napoli (1)	0–2	Internazionale (1)	Naples
20:45 CET (UTC+1)		Report	Jovetić 74'; Ljajić 90+2'	Stadium: Stadio San Paolo; Attendance: 25,968; Referee: Paolo Valeri

20 January 2016	Lazio (1)	0–1	Juventus (1)	Rome
20:45 CET (UTC+1)		Report	Lichtsteiner 66'	Stadium: Stadio Olimpico; Attendance: 30,799; Referee: Antonio Damato

==== Semi-finals ====
Semi-finals were played on 26–27 January and 1–2 March 2016.

===== First leg =====
26 January 2016	Alessandria (3)	0–1	Milan (1)	Turin
21:00 CET (UTC+1)		Report	Balotelli 43' (pen.)	Stadium: Stadio Olimpico; Attendance: 20,605; Referee: Massimiliano Irrati

27 January 2016	Juventus (1)	3–0	Internazionale (1)	Turin
20:45 CET (UTC+1)	Morata 36' (pen.), 63'; Dybala 84'	Report		Stadium: Juventus Stadium; Attendance: 39,441; Referee: Paolo Tagliavento

===== Second leg =====
1 March 2016	Milan (1)	5–0 (6–0 agg.)	Alessandria (3)	Milan
21:00 CET (UTC+1)	Ménez 20', 39'; Romagnoli 24', 80'; Balotelli 89'	Report		Stadium: San Siro; Attendance: 28,202; Referee: Marco Guida

2 March 2016	Internazionale (1)	3–0 (a.e.t.) (3–3 agg.) (3–5 p)	Juventus (1)	Milan
20:45 CET (UTC+1)	Brozović 17', 82' (pen.); Perišić 49'	Report		Stadium: San Siro; Attendance: 29,357; Referee: Andrea Gervasoni
	Penalties
	Brozović (penalty scored); Palacio (penalty missed); Manaj (penalty scored); Nagatomo (penalty scored)		(penalty scored) Barzagli; (penalty scored) Zaza; (penalty scored) Morata; (penalty scored) Pogba; (penalty scored) Bonucci

== Final ==
21 May 2016
20:45 CEST (UTC+2)

Milan	0–1 (a.e.t.)	Juventus
	Report	Morata 110'

Stadio Olimpico, Rome
Attendance: 72,698
Referee: Gianluca Rocchi

== Top goalscorers ==
Rank	Player	Club	Goals
1	(Italy) Giulio Bizzotto	Cittadella	5
2	(Croatia) Marcelo Brozović	Internazionale	3
2	(Spain) Álvaro Morata	Juventus	3
2	(Senegal) M'Baye Niang	Milan	3
2	(Italy) Massimo Loviso	Alessandria	3
2	(Italy) Riccardo Bocalon	Alessandria	3
2	(Uruguay) Pablo Granoche	Modena	3
2	(Italy) Roberto Floriano	Foggia	3
2	(Italy) Claudio Coralli	Cittadella	3
2	(Brazil) Ryder Matos	Carpi	3
2	(Italy) Simone Guerra	FeralpiSalò	3
