= 2013–14 Coppa Italia =

TIM Cup

Tournament details
- Country: Italy
- Dates: 3 Aug 2013 – 3 May 2014
- Teams: 78

Final positions
- Champions: Napoli (5th title)
- Runners-up: Fiorentina

Tournament statistics
- Matches played: 79
- Goals scored: 222 (2.81 per match)
- Top goal scorer(s): Lorenzo Insigne; Callejón; Gervinho; Osarimen Ebagua; Felice Evacuo; Giuseppe De Luca; Marco Sansovini (3 goals)

The 2013–14 Coppa Italia, also known as TIM Cup for sponsorship reasons, was the 67th edition of the domestic competition. As in the previous year, 78 clubs have taken part in the tournament. Lazio were the cup holders. Napoli were the winners, thus qualifying for the group stage of the 2014–15 UEFA Europa League.

== First round ==
First round matches were played on 3, 4 and 6 August 2013.

3 August 2013	Paganese (3)	0–0 (3–4 p)	Pro Patria (3)	Pagani
19:30				Stadium: Stadio Marcello Torre; Attendance: 400; Referee: Pietro Dei Giudici
	Penalties
	Franco (penalty scored); Toppan (penalty scored); Velardi (penalty missed); Cioffi (penalty scored); Amelio (penalty missed)		Polverini (penalty scored); Bruccini (penalty scored); Serafini (penalty scored); Ghidoli (penalty scored); Nossa (penalty missed)

3 August 2013	Grosseto (3)	2–2 (6–5 p)	Venezia (3)	Grosseto
19:45	Giovio 58'; Gioè 88'		D'Apollonia 65'; Bocalon 77'	Stadium: Stadio Olimpico Carlo Zecchini; Referee: Claudio Lanza
	Penalties
	Scappini (penalty scored); Calderoni (penalty scored); Colombi (penalty missed); Barba (penalty scored); Esposito (penalty scored); Som (penalty scored); Formiconi (penalty scored)		Max Taddei (penalty scored); Franchini (penalty scored); Marconi (penalty missed); Battaglia (penalty scored); Giorico (penalty scored); Pignat (penalty scored); Bertolucci (penalty missed)

4 August 2013	AlbinoLeffe (3)	4–1	Turris Neapolis (5)	Bergamo
15:30	Maietti 28'; Cissé 68'; Corradi 71'; Vorobjovs 90'		Sibilli 19' (pen.)	Stadium: Stadio Atleti Azzurri d'Italia; Referee: Marco Bellotti

4 August 2013	Lumezzane (3)	3–0	Massese (5)	Lumezzane
16:00	Torregrossa 27'; Galuppini 45'; Talato 75'			Stadium: Nuovo Stadio Comunale; Referee: Andrea Morreale

4 August 2013	Pontisola (5)	2–0	Ascoli (3)	Ponte San Pietro
16:30	Salandra 45+1'; Crotti 60'			Stadium: Stadio Matteo Legler; Referee: Pasquale Cangiano

4 August 2013	Südtirol (3)	2–0	Matera (5)	Bolzano
16:30	Ekuban 37'; Vassallo 76'			Stadium: Stadio Marco Druso; Attendance: 650; Referee: Simone Aversano

4 August 2013	Cremonese (3)	3–0	Viareggio (3)	Cremona
17:00	Loviso 47'; Visconti 53'; Carlini 67'			Stadium: Stadio Giovanni Zini; Referee: Luca Albertini

4 August 2013	Pisa (3)	1–0	Termoli (5)	Pisa
17:00	Martella 38'			Stadium: Arena Garibaldi-Stadio Romeo Anconetani; Referee: Cristian Brasi

4 August 2013	Benevento (3)	4–0	Pontedera (3)	Benevento
19:30	Montiel 3'; Evacuo 10', 90+3' (pen.); Campagnacci 19'			Stadium: Stadio Ciro Vigorito; Referee: Stefano D'Angelo

4 August 2013	Perugia (3)	0–1 (a.e.t.)	Savona (3)	Perugia
19:30			Gentile 95'	Stadium: Stadio Renato Curi; Referee: Lorenzo Illuzzi

4 August 2013	Vicenza (3)	3–1	FeralpiSalò (3)	Vicenza
19:30	Mustacchio 27'; Giacomelli 55', 78'		Miracoli 22'	Stadium: Stadio Romeo Menti; Referee: Domenico Rocca

4 August 2013	Pro Vercelli (3)	0–1	Monza Brianza (4)	Vercelli
19:30			Finotto 24'	Stadium: Stadio Silvio Piola; Referee: Stefano Giovani

4 August 2013	Virtus Entella (3)	5–2	Gualdo Casacastalda (5)	Chiavari
19:45	Cesar 12'; Raggio Garibaldi 32'; Magnaghi 47', 57'; Di Tacchio 89'		Marri 43'; De Luca 78'	Stadium: Stadio Angelo Daneri; Referee: Marco Piccinini

4 August 2013	Frosinone (3)	1–0	L'Aquila (3)	Frosinone
19:45	Frara 22'			Stadium: Stadio Comunale Matusa; Referee: Antonio Eros Lacagnina

4 August 2013	Lecce (3)	3–0	Santhià (5)	Lecce
19:45	Tundo 57'; Bencivenga 66'; Bogliacino 70'			Stadium: Stadio Comunale Via del Mare; Referee: Gianluca Ceccarelli

4 August 2013	Nocerina (3)	0–2	Pordenone (5)	Nocera Inferiore
20:00			Zubin 16'; Nichele 82'	Stadium: Stadio San Francesco d'Assisi; Referee: Valerio Marini

4 August 2013	Salernitana (3)	0–3	Teramo (4)	Salerno
20:00			Petrella 50', 74'; Bernardo 67'	Stadium: Stadio Arechi; Referee: Rosario Abisso

6 August 2013	Gubbio (3)	3–0	Savoia (5)	Gubbio
16:30	Falconieri 37'; Caccavallo 47'; Sandomenico 80'			Stadium: Stadio Pietro Barbetti

== Second round ==
Second round matches were played on 10 & 11 August 2013.

10 August 2013	Spezia (2)	4–2 (a.e.t.)	Pro Patria (3)	La Spezia
20:30	Lizuzzo 56'; Ceccarelli 79'; Sansovini 105+1' (pen.); Ebagua 116'		Serafini 51', 52'	Stadium: Stadio Alberto Picco

10 August 2013	Cesena (2)	4–1	Pontisola (5)	Cesena
20:45	Succi 45'; Camporese 55'; Tabanelli 59'; Garritano 90'		Traini 12'	Stadium: Stadio Dino Manuzzi

11 August 2013	Modena (2)	0–1	Frosinone (3)	Modena
18:00			Paganini 65'	Stadium: Stadio Alberto Braglia

11 August 2013	Novara (2)	3–0	Grosseto (3)	Novara
18:00	González 9'; Faragò 41', 79'			Stadium: Stadio Silvio Piola

11 August 2013	Reggina (2)	1–0	Carpi (2)	Reggio Calabria
19:45	Gerardi 44'			Stadium: Stadio Oreste Granillo

11 August 2013	Cittadella (2)	1–0	Savona (3)	Cittadella
20:30	Di Roberto 35'			Stadium: Stadio Pier Cesare Tombolato

11 August 2013	Trapani (2)	3–0	AlbinoLeffe (3)	Erice
20:30	Mancosu 43' (pen.), 54'; Madonia 72'			Stadium: Stadio Polisportivo Provinciale

11 August 2013	Brescia (2)	3–1	Teramo (4)	Brescia
20:30	Caracciolo 2'; Mitrović 76'; Oduamadi 90+3'		Gaeta 83'	Stadium: Stadio Mario Rigamonti

11 August 2013	Virtus Lanciano (2)	0–2	Benevento (3)	Lanciano
20:30			Montiel 47'; Evacuo 57'	Stadium: Stadio Comunale Guido Biondi

11 August 2013	Avellino (2)	1–0	Monza Brianza (4)	Avellino
20:30	Castaldo 30'			Stadium: Stadio Partenio-Adriano Lombardi

11 August 2013	Pescara (2)	1–0	Pordenone (5)	Pescara
20:45	Maniero 14'			Stadium: Stadio Adriatico - Giovanni Cornacchia

11 August 2013	Padova (2)	2–1	Virtus Entella (3)	Padua
20:45	Pasquato 84'; Vantaggiato 89' (pen.)		Rosso 52'	Stadium: Stadio Euganeo

11 August 2013	Empoli (2)	5–1	Südtirol (3)	Empoli
20:45	Maccarone 45'; Cappellini 66'; Mchedlidze 80', 89'; Verdi 83' (pen.)		Campo 48'	Stadium: Stadio Carlo Castellani

11 August 2013	Crotone (2)	2–0	Latina (2)	Crotone
20:45	Pettinari 39', 51'			Stadium: Stadio Ezio Scida

11 August 2013	Siena (2)	4–1	Pisa (3)	Siena
20:45	Rosina 8' (pen.); D'Agostino 17' (pen.); Giannetti 20'; Paolucci 33'		Giovinco 61'	Stadium: Stadio Artemio Franchi - Montepaschi Arena

11 August 2013	Palermo (2)	2–1	Cremonese (3)	Palermo
20:45	Lafferty 16'; Pisano 60'		Abbruscato 76' (pen.)	Stadium: Stadio Renzo Barbera

11 August 2013	Ternana (2)	2–4 (a.e.t.)	Lecce (3)	Terni
20:45	Farkaš 63'; Ferronetti 90+5'		Zigoni 4', 77'; Salvi 97'; Bellazzini 117'	Stadium: Stadio Libero Liberati

11 August 2013	Juve Stabia (2)	3–0	Gubbio (3)	Castellammare di Stabia
20:45	Di Carmine 34'; Diop 44'; Mezavilla 69'			Stadium: Stadio Romeo Menti

11 August 2013	Varese (2)	1–0	Vicenza (3)	Varese
20:45	Rea 76'			Stadium: Stadio Franco Ossola

11 August 2013	Bari (2)	1–1 (a.e.t.) (4–3 p)	Lumezzane (3)	Bari
20:45	Albadoro 92'		Torregrossa 119'	Stadium: Stadio San Nicola

== Third round ==
Third round matches were played on 17 & 18 August 2013.

17 August 2013	Livorno (1)	0–1	Siena (2)	Livorno
17:00			Ângelo 44'	Stadium: Stadio Armando Picchi; Attendance: 1,500

17 August 2013	Spezia (2)	2–2 (a.e.t.) (3–2 p)	Genoa (1)	La Spezia
18:30	Sansovini 39'; Ebagua 82'		Gilardino 12'; Lodi 90+4' (pen.)	Stadium: Stadio Alberto Picco; Attendance: 1,200

17 August 2013	Trapani (2)	1–0	Padova (2)	Erice
20:00	Nizzetto 68'			Stadium: Stadio Polisportivo Provinciale; Attendance: 1,400

17 August 2013	Torino (1)	1–2	Pescara (2)	Turin
20:30	Immobile 53'		Maniero 46'; Ragusa 58'	Stadium: Stadio Olimpico di Torino; Attendance: 2,839

17 August 2013	Reggina (2)	1–0	Crotone (2)	Reggio Calabria
20:30	Gerardi 49'			Stadium: Stadio Oreste Granillo; Attendance: 900

17 August 2013	Palermo (2)	0–1	Hellas Verona (1)	Palermo
20:30			Toni 38'	Stadium: Stadio Renzo Barbera; Attendance: 2,000

17 August 2013	Avellino (2)	1–0	Cesena (2)	Avellino
20:30	Galabinov 24'			Stadium: Stadio Partenio; Attendance: 500

17 August 2013	Chievo (1)	2–0	Empoli (2)	Vicenza
20:45	Radovanović 7'; Théréau 23' (pen.)			Stadium: Stadio Romeo Menti; Attendance: 1,160

17 August 2013	Bologna (1)	1–0	Brescia (2)	Bologna
20:45	Diamanti 40'			Stadium: Stadio Renato Dall'Ara; Attendance: 1,400

17 August 2013	Sampdoria (1)	2–0	Benevento (3)	Turin
20:45	Gabbiadini 71', 81'			Stadium: Stadio Olimpico di Torino; Attendance: 900

17 August 2013	Cagliari (1)	1–2 (a.e.t.)	Frosinone (3)	Trieste
20:45	Pinilla 32'		Ciofani 26'; Curiale 120'	Stadium: Stadio Nereo Rocco; Attendance: 700

17 August 2013	Parma (1)	4–0	Lecce (3)	Parma
20:45	Amauri 21'; Cassano 53' (pen.); Munari 80'; Palladino 84'			Stadium: Stadio Ennio Tardini; Attendance: 1,200

17 August 2013	Juve Stabia (2)	1–1 (a.e.t.) (3–4 p)	Varese (2)	Castellammare di Stabia
20:45	Mezavilla 51'		Tremolada 14'	Stadium: Stadio Romeo Menti; Attendance: 600

17 August 2013	Novara (2)	1–3 (a.e.t.)	Sassuolo (1)	Novara
20:45	Comi 53'		Laribi 3'; Pavoletti 109'; Diego Farias 115'	Stadium: Stadio Silvio Piola; Attendance: 1,000

18 August 2013	Internazionale (1)	4–0	Cittadella (2)	Milan
18:30	Jonathan 18'; Palacio 31' (pen.), 58'; Ranocchia 62'			Stadium: San Siro; Attendance: 8,820

18 August 2013	Atalanta (1)	3–0	Bari (2)	Bergamo
19:00	Livaja 7', 31'; De Luca 75'			Stadium: Stadio Atleti Azzurri d'Italia; Attendance: 1,900

== Fourth round ==
Fourth Round matches were played on 3, 4 and 5 December 2013.

3 December 2013	Spezia (2)	3–0	Pescara (2)	La Spezia
15:00	Ebagua 7'; Sansovini 45'; Rivas 88'	Report	Župarić (yellow card) 22' (yellow-red card) 24'; Cutolo (red card) 31'	Stadium: Stadio Alberto Picco; Attendance: 4,104; Referee: Massimiliano Irrati

3 December 2013	Avellino (2)	2–1	Frosinone (3)	Avellino
17:00	D'Angelo 22'; Castaldo 82'	Report	Ciofani 90'	Stadium: Stadio Partenio; Attendance: 3,500; Referee: Dino Tommasi

3 December 2013	Bologna (1)	1–2 (a.e.t.)	Siena (2)	Bologna
19:00	Moscardelli 85'	Report	Valiani 78'; Feddal 120+3'	Stadium: Stadio Renato Dall'Ara; Attendance: 1,500; Referee: Daniele Chiffi

3 December 2013	Parma (1)	4–1	Varese (2)	Parma
21:00	Valdés 6'; Munari 52'; Palladino 58'; Rosi 69'	Report	Damonte 88'	Stadium: Stadio Ennio Tardini; Attendance: 1,420; Referee: Claudio Gavillucci

4 December 2013	Chievo (1)	4–1	Reggina (2)	Verona
17:00	Paloschi 16' (pen.), 25'; Ardemagni 50'; Silva 77'	Report	Gentili 36'	Stadium: Stadio Marc'Antonio Bentegodi; Attendance: 1,000; Referee: Filippo Merchiori

4 December 2013	Atalanta (1)	2–0	Sassuolo (1)	Bergamo
19:00	Koné 54'; De Luca 72'	Report		Stadium: Stadio Atleti Azzurri d'Italia; Attendance: 3,000; Referee: Leonardo Baracani

4 December 2013	Internazionale (1)	3–2	Trapani (2)	Milan
21:00	Guarín 4'; Belfodil 40'; Taïder 44' (pen.)	Report	Caccetta 54'; Madonia 90'	Stadium: San Siro; Attendance: 12,714; Referee: Riccardo Pinzani

5 December 2013	Sampdoria (1)	4–1	Hellas Verona (1)	Genoa
21:00	Sansone 15'; Bjarnason 20'; Krstičić 83'; Renan 88'	Report	Longo 64'	Stadium: Stadio Luigi Ferraris; Attendance: 4,785; Referee: Luigi Nasca

== Final stage ==
=== Bracket ===
Round of 16
1	Milan	3
Spezia	1
8	Udinese	1
Internazionale	0
5	Fiorentina	2
Chievo	0
4	Catania	1
Siena	4
3	Roma	1
Sampdoria	0
6	Juventus	3
Avellino	0
7	Lazio	2
Parma	1
2	Napoli	3
Atalanta	1

Quarter-finals
Milan	1
Udinese	2
Fiorentina	2
Siena	1
Roma	1
Juventus	0
Lazio	0
Napoli	1

Semi-finals
Udinese	2	0	2
Fiorentina	1	2	3
Roma	3	0	3
Napoli	2	3	5

Final
Fiorentina	1
Napoli	3

==== Round of 16 ====
18 December 2013	Juventus	3–0	Avellino	Turin
21:00 CET	Giovinco 7'; Cáceres 16'; Quagliarella 35'	Report		Stadium: Juventus Stadium; Attendance: 17,716; Referee: Massimiliano Irrati

8 January 2014	Fiorentina	2–0	Chievo	Florence
21:00 CET	Joaquín 30'; Rebić 45+2'	Report		Stadium: Stadio Artemio Franchi; Attendance: 7,949; Referee: Massimiliano Irrati

9 January 2014	Roma	1–0	Sampdoria	Rome
18:00 CET	Torosidis 6'	Report		Stadium: Stadio Olimpico; Attendance: 20,493; Referee: Dino Tommasi

9 January 2014	Udinese	1–0	Internazionale	Udine
21:00 CET	Maicosuel 32'	Report		Stadium: Stadio Friuli; Attendance: 6,242; Referee: Gianpaolo Calvarese

14 January 2014	Lazio	2–1	Parma	Rome
21:00 CET	Perea 25', 90+1'	Report	Biabiany 43'	Stadium: Stadio Olimpico; Referee: Andrea Gervasoni

15 January 2014	Catania	1–4	Siena	Catania
16:00 CET	Leto 4'	Report	Paolucci 24'; Valiani 60'; Pulzetti 90+1'; Rosseti 90+3'	Stadium: Stadio Angelo Massimino; Attendance: 4,000; Referee: Sebastiano Peruzzo

15 January 2014	Milan	3–1	Spezia	Milan
18:00 CET	Robinho 28'; Pazzini 32'; Honda 47'	Report	Ferrari 90+1'	Stadium: San Siro; Attendance: 15,584; Referee: Carmine Russo

15 January 2014	Napoli	3–1	Atalanta	Naples
21:00 CET	Callejón 15', 80'; Insigne 72'	Report	De Luca 14'	Stadium: Stadio San Paolo; Attendance: 35,000; Referee: Andrea De Marco

==== Quarter-finals ====
21 January 2014	Roma	1–0	Juventus	Rome
20:45 CET	Gervinho 79'	Report		Stadium: Stadio Olimpico; Attendance: 60,000; Referee: Paolo Tagliavento

22 January 2014	Milan	1–2	Udinese	Milan
21:00 CET	Balotelli 6'	Report	Muriel 41' (pen.); López 77'	Stadium: San Siro; Attendance: 10,227; Referee: Marco Guida

23 January 2014	Fiorentina	2–1	Siena	Florence
21:00 CET	Iličić 20'; Compper 75'	Report	Giacomazzi 59'	Stadium: Stadio Artemio Franchi; Attendance: 15,321; Referee: Paolo Giacomelli

29 January 2014	Napoli	1−0	Lazio	Naples
20:45 CET	Higuaín 82'	Report		Stadium: Stadio San Paolo; Referee: Luca Banti

==== Semi-finals ====
===== First leg =====
4 February 2014	Udinese	2–1	Fiorentina	Udine
21:00 CET	Di Natale 36'; Muriel 82'	Report	Vargas 44'	Stadium: Stadio Friuli; Referee: Carmine Russo

5 February 2014	Roma	3–2	Napoli	Rome
20:45 CET	Gervinho 13', 88'; Strootman 32'	Report	De Sanctis 47' (o.g.); Mertens 70'	Stadium: Stadio Olimpico; Referee: Mauro Bergonzi

===== Second leg =====
11 February 2014	Fiorentina	2–0 (3–2 agg.)	Udinese	Florence
21:00 CET	Pasqual 14'; Cuadrado 61'	Report		Stadium: Stadio Artemio Franchi; Referee: Davide Massa

12 February 2014	Napoli	3–0 (5–3 agg.)	Roma	Naples
20:45 CET	Callejón 33'; Higuaín 48'; Jorginho 51'	Report		Stadium: Stadio San Paolo; Referee: Gianluca Rocchi

== Final ==
3 May 2014
21:45 CEST

Fiorentina	1–3	Napoli
Vargas 28'	Report	Insigne 11', 17'; Mertens 90+2'

Stadio Olimpico, Rome
Attendance: 65,000
Referee: Daniele Orsato

== Top goalscorers ==
Rank	Player	Club	Goals
1	(Italy) Lorenzo Insigne	Napoli	3
1	(Spain) José Callejón	Napoli	3
1	(Ivory Coast) Gervinho	Roma	3
1	(Nigeria) Osarimen Ebagua	Spezia	3
1	(Italy) Felice Evacuo	Benevento	3
1	(Italy) Giuseppe De Luca	Atalanta	3
1	(Italy) Marco Sansovini	Spezia	3
