= 2023–24 FC Pro Vercelli 1892 season =

FC Pro Vercelli 1892
2023–24 season
- Manager: Andrea Dossena
- Stadium: Stadio Silvio Piola
- Serie C Group A: 4th
- Coppa Italia Serie C: First round
- Top goalscorer: League: Matteo Maggio (7); All: Matteo Maggio (7)

The 2023–24 season is FC Pro Vercelli 1892's 132nd season in existence and sixth consecutive in the Serie C. They are also competing in the Coppa Italia Serie C.

== Players ==
=== First-team squad ===
As of 7 September 2023

Note: Flags indicate national team as defined under FIFA eligibility rules; some limited exceptions apply. Players may hold more than one non-FIFA nationality.

No.	Pos.	Nation	Player
1	GK	ITA	Alex Valentini
3	DF	ITA	Francesco Rodio
4	MF	ITA	Simone Emmanuello
5	DF	ITA	Alessandro Carosso
6	DF	ITA	Agostino Camigliano (on loan from Ancona)
7	FW	ITA	Mattia Mustacchio
8	MF	ITA	Ilario Iotti
9	FW	ITA	Alessio Nepi
10	FW	ITA	Gianmario Comi
11	FW	ITA	Simone Condello
12	GK	ITA	Matteo Rizzo
14	MF	ITA	Salvatore Santoro (on loan from Pisa)
15	MF	ITA	Alessandro Spavone (on loan from Napoli)
16	FW	ITA	Hamza Haoudi (on loan from Frosinone)

No.	Pos.	Nation	Player
17	MF	ITA	Francesco Contaldo
18	FW	ITA	Filippo Gheza
19	DF	ITA	Filippo Fiumanò
20	MF	ITA	Alessandro Louati
22	GK	ITA	Jacopo Sassi (on loan from Atalanta)
27	FW	ITA	Matteo Maggio
28	MF	ITA	Ousmane Niang
29	DF	ITA	Roberto Iezzi
30	MF	AUS	Massimo Forte
32	DF	ITA	Giulio Parodi
33	GK	ITA	Nicolò Vaccarezza
70	FW	ITA	Antonio Pesce (on loan from Napoli)
74	DF	ITA	Daniele Sarzi Puttini
93	MF	ITA	Mirco Petrella

=== Out on loan ===
Note: Flags indicate national team as defined under FIFA eligibility rules; some limited exceptions apply. Players may hold more than one non-FIFA nationality.

No.	Pos.	Nation	Player
—	DF	ITA	Gianluca Clemente (at Ancona until 30 June 2024)
—	MF	ITA	Filippo Lorenzoni (at L'Aquila until 30 June 2024)

No.	Pos.	Nation	Player
—	FW	ITA	Cristian Bunino (at Brindisi until 30 June 2024)

== Transfers ==
=== In ===
Pos.	Player	Transferred from	Fee	Date	Source

=== Out ===
Pos.	Player	Transferred to	Fee	Date	Source

== Pre-season and friendlies ==
Win Draw Loss Fixtures

13 August 2023 Friendly	Pro Vercelli (Italy)	2–7	(Italy) Juventus Next Gen	Vercelli
17:00 CEST (UTC+2)	Mustacchio 14'; Emmanuello 17'; Iezzi (yellow card) 36'; Comi (red card) 78'		Cerri 3'; Muharemović 24'; Mbangula 33', 51'; Mulazzi (yellow card) 53'; Yıldız 40', 61'; Da Graca 90+1'	Stadium: Stadio Silvio Piola; Referee: Federico Bray

== Competitions ==
=== Overall record ===
Competition	First match	Last match	Starting round	Final position	Record							
Competition	First match	Last match	Starting round	Final position	Pld	W	D	L	GF	GA	GD	Win %
Serie C	September 2023	28 April 2024	Matchday 1		19	9	5	5	28	21	+7	47.37
Coppa Italia Serie C	4 October 2023		First round	First round	1	0	0	1	1	5	−4	0.00
Total					20	9	5	6	29	26	+3	45.00

Last updated: 22 December 2023
Source: Soccerway

=== Serie C ===
==== League table ====
Pos	Team	Pld	W	D	L	GF	GA	GD	Pts	Qualification
6	Legnago	38	13	17	8	46	39	+7	56	Group play-offs 1st round
7	Giana Erminio	38	15	8	15	46	44	+2	53 (Note: Giana Erminio and Pro Vercelli are ahead of Lumezzane on head-to-head points: Giana Erminio 9, Pro Vercelli 9, Lumezzane 0. Giana Erminio are ahead of Pro Vercelli on head-to-head goal difference: Giana Erminio +2, Pro Vercelli -2.)	Group play-offs 1st round
8	Pro Vercelli	38	14	11	13	50	47	+3	53	Group play-offs 1st round
9	Lumezzane	38	15	8	15	49	48	+1	53	Group play-offs 1st round
10	Trento	38	13	12	13	34	37	−3	51	Group play-offs 1st round

Updated to match(es) played on 28 April 2024. Source: Lega Pro, Soccerway (in English)
Rules for classification: 1) Points; 2) Head-to-head points; 3) Head-to-head goal difference; 4) Goal difference; 5) Goals scored; 6) Lower goals against; 7) Wins; 8) Lower losses; 9) Away wins; 10) Lower home losses.
(Note: Head-to-head record is used only after all the matches between the teams in question have been played)

==== Results summary ====
Overall								Home						Away					
Pld	W	D	L	GF	GA	GD	Pts	W	D	L	GF	GA	GD	W	D	L	GF	GA	GD
38	14	11	13	50	47	+3	53	10	5	4	30	18	+12	4	6	9	20	29	−9

Source: Worldfootball

==== Results by round ====
Round	1	2	3	4	5	6	7	8	9	10	11	12	13	14	15	16	17	18	19
Ground	H	A	A	H	A	H	H	A	H	A	H	A	H	A	H	A	H	A	H
Result	W	D	L	D	L	W	W	W	W	L	W	D	D	L	W	W	W	L	D
Position	3	3	9	10	14	10	7	6	4	5	4	5	7	7	6	4	4	4	4

Updated to match(es) played on 22 December 2023. Source: Worldfootball
A = Away; H = Home; W = Win; D = Draw; L = Loss

==== Matches ====
The league fixtures were unveiled on 7 August 2023.

September 2023	v
--:-- CEST (UTC+2)

=== Coppa Italia Serie C ===
4 October 2023 First round	Pro Vercelli	1–5	Juventus Next Gen	Vercelli
18:30 CEST (UTC+2)	Gheza 8'	Report	Nonge Boende 18', 46'; Mancini 42', 54' (pen.), 66'	Stadium: Stadio Silvio Piola; Referee: Jules Roland Andeng Tona Mbei
