= Iotti =

Iotti is a surname. Notable people with the surname include:

- Bruno Iotti (born 1987), Brazilian midfielder
- Ilario Iotti (born 1995), Italian footballer
- Luca Iotti (born 1995), Italian footballer
- Nilde Iotti (1920–1999), Italian politician

== See also ==
- Lotti
