= Stadio Silvio Piola =

Stadio Silvio Piola may refer to a pair of football stadiums in Italy named after the footballer:

- Stadio Silvio Piola (Novara), home ground of Novara Calcio
- Stadio Silvio Piola (Vercelli), home ground of Pro Vercelli
