= Raffaele Imparato =

Italian footballer (born 1986)

Personal information
- Date of birth: 3 September 1986 (age 40)
- Place of birth: Avellino, Italy
- Height: 1.80 m (5 ft 11 in)
- Position: Right back

Team information
- Current team: Vis Ariano Accadia

Youth career
- 1996–2004: Sangiuseppese

Senior career*
Years	Team	Apps	(Gls)
2004–2005	Sangiuseppese	6	(0)
2005–2008	Salernitana	8	(0)
2006	→ Nocerina (loan)	4	(0)
2006–2007	→ Torres (loan)	22	(0)
2008	→ Juve Stabia (loan)	10	(0)
2008–2012	Catania	0	(0)
2008–2009	→ Paganese (loan)	24	(0)
2009–2010	→ Taranto (loan)	8	(0)
2011	→ Paganese (loan)	15	(0)
2011–2012	→ Milazzo (loan)	23	(0)
2012–2014	Vicenza	0	(0)
2013–2014	→ Sorrento (loan)	27	(1)
2014–2015	Torres	30	(0)
2015–2016	Maceratese	34	(0)
2016–2017	Perugia	5	(0)
2017	Teramo	7	(0)
2017–2018	Ebolitana	16	(0)
2018–2019	Pomigliano	15	(0)
2019	Agropoli		
2019–	Vis Ariano Accadia		
- * Club domestic league appearances and goals as of 25 February 2018

Raffaele Imparato (born 3 September 1986) is an Italian footballer who plays as a defender for USD Vis Ariano Accadia.

== Club career ==
=== Early career ===
Imparato was born in Avellino, Campania. He began his senior career with the Serie D club, Sangiuseppese. He made six appearances for the club during his first season as a professional.

=== Salernitana Calcio ===
Ahead of the 2005–06 Serie C1 season, he was signed by Salernitana Calcio 1919, the team that replaced bankrupted Salernitana Sport and represented the town of Salerno. In January 2006, Imparato was loaned to Nocerina and made just 4 league appearances during the second half of the 2005–06 season. Ahead of the 2006–07 season, he was loaned to Sassari Torres, where he made 22 league appearances in the former Serie C2. He returned to Salerno ahead of the 2007–08 season, but after making just 8 appearances, he was again loaned out. In January 2008 he joined S.S. Juve Stabia on a 6-month loan deal, along with teammates Roberto Magliocco (loan) and Lorenzo Prisco (permanent deal). On 3 July 2008, along with Magliocco, Salernitana terminated the player's contracts with club, although Salernitana won promotion to Serie B as Serie C1 Group B champions.

=== Calcio Catania ===
On 10 July 2008, he was signed by Serie A club Calcio Catania, on a 5-year contract. He was immediately loaned to Lega Pro Prima Divisione side, Paganese Calcio ahead of the 2008-09 Serie A campaign.

On 1 July 2009, Imparato returned to Catania and on 31 July 2009 was transferred to A.S. Taranto Calcio on a season long loan deal along with Marco Di Fatta and Adriano Mezavilla who joined the club in co-ownership deals. Imparato's loan was, however, terminated on 1 February 2010. He returned to Catania for the remainder of the campaign, although he failed to feature in any official matches for the club. Ahead of the 2010–11 statistical season, Imparato remained with Catania until January 2011, when he re-joined former club, Paganese Calcio on another 6-month loan deal. He earned regular playing time once more with the third division club and made 15 appearances during his stay. On 30 June 2011, he returned to Catania.

Prior to the 2011-12 Serie A campaign, Calcio Catania once again loaned out Imparato, this time to Lega Pro Seconda Divisione outfit S.S. Milazzo. With Milazzo, Imparato went on to make 24 league appearances, and was notably sent-off twice throughout the campaign.

=== Vicenza Calcio ===
On 6 July 2012, Imparato officially completed a transfer to Lega Pro Prima Divisione outfit, Vicenza Calcio on a permanent transfer, as part of the deal that saw Alberto Frison transfer to Catania on a co-ownership basis. Vicenza Calcio have made several transfers as they look to limit their stay in the Lega Pro following their relegation from Serie B due to a play-out loss to Empoli F.C. on aggregate. However Vicenza readmitted to Serie B after U.S. Lecce was expelled.

On 2 September 2013, he left for Sorrento in temporary deal, re-joining forward Pasquale Maiorino who left for the same club on 29 August, with forward Roberto Esposito moved to Vicenza also in temporary deal on 2 September.

=== Torres ===
On 13 August 2014 Imparato and Maiorino were signed by Torres. The club was re-admitted to Lega Pro on 1 August.

=== Perugia ===
He reached the highest level of his career so far in the 2016–17 season, when he played 5 games for Perugia in the second-tier Serie B.

=== Agropoli ===
In January 2019, Imparato joined Agropoli.

=== Vis Ariano Accadia ===
On 11 September 2019, Imparato signed with Italian club USD Vis Ariano Accadia.
