= Talamo =

Talamo is a surname. Notable people with the surname include:

- Gino Talamo (1895–1968), Italian actor, film editor, and director
- Joseph Talamo (born 1990), American jockey
- Nicola Talamo (born 1996), Italian footballer
