= Gennaro Scognamiglio =

Italian footballer

Personal information
- Date of birth: 24 April 1987 (age 39)
- Place of birth: Gragnano, Italy
- Height: 1.87 m (6 ft 2 in)
- Position: Centre back

Team information
- Current team: Reggiana (technical director)

Youth career
- –2002: Treviso
- 2002–2005: Salernitana

Senior career*
Years	Team	Apps	(Gls)
2005–2006	Savoia	20	(0)
2006–2008	Sangiuseppese	61	(1)
2008–2010	Crotone	26	(1)
2010	→ Cosenza (loan)	7	(0)
2010–2013	Juve Stabia	84	(6)
2013–2014	Parma	0	(0)
2013–2014	→ Perugia (loan)	32	(4)
2014–2015	Benevento	34	(6)
2015–2016	Trapani	44	(8)
2016	Pisa	0	(0)
2016–2017	Novara	28	(1)
2017–2018	Cesena	36	(3)
2018–2021	Pescara	78	(5)
2021–2023	Avellino	18	(0)
2023–2024	Giugliano	19	(2)

Managerial career
- 2024–2025: Giugliano (technical director)
- 2025–: Reggiana (technical director)
- * Club domestic league appearances and goals

Gennaro Scognamiglio (born 24 April 1987) is an Italian football official and a former centre back. He is the technical director of Reggiana.

== Early career ==
Born in Gragnano, Campania, he started his career in the youth teams of Treviso and later Salernitana. In 2005, he was signed to play for Serie D side Savoia, but didn't make any appearances for the first team in competitive matches. He moved on to Sangiuseppese, where he made 61 appearances, scoring 1 goal.

== Career ==
Scognamiglio signed for Crotone in Serie B in 2008. He made a six-month loan to Cosenza but was released by Crotone the day after its expiry and became a free agent. He was soon signed by Juve Stabia, where he remained for three years. In 2013, he moved to Parma but was immediately loaned to Perugia for one year. He left Parma soon after the expiry of the loan, moving to Benevento without making a single appearance for the Emilia-Romagna team. Scognamiglio remained at Benevento for one year, making 34 appearances and scoring 6 goals, establishing himself as a solid player for Juan Landaida's side as they were crowned champions of Lega Pro Group C, and gained promotion to Serie B. In the summer of 2015, Scognamiglio signed for Pisa, but he stayed in Tuscany for less than a month before being signed by Novara, back in Serie B.

=== Novara ===
Scognamiglio made his Novara debut on 13 August 2016, playing 120 minutes of the 1-0 (AET) win over Latina in the 2016–17 Coppa Italia. His league debut came nearly a month later, playing the full game against former club Pisa in a 1–0 loss. He scored his first goal for the club in Serie B Match Day 19, netting in the 39th minute of an eventual 3–1 win over Cesena.

=== Pescara ===
On 26 July 2018, he joined Serie B club Pescara.

=== Avellino ===
On 19 July 2021, he signed a two-year contract with Avellino.

=== Giugliano ===
On 11 January 2023, Scognamiglio joined Giugliano on a two-year deal.
