= Polverini =

Polverini is an Italian surname. Notable people with the surname include:

- Dario Polverini (born 1987), Italian footballer
- Renata Polverini (born 1962), Italian politician and trade unionist
