= Bizzotto =

Bizzotto is an Italian surname. Notable people with the surname include:

- Frank Bizzotto (born 1971), Australian rules footballer
- Giulio Bizzotto (born 1996), Italian footballer
- Mara Bizzotto (born 1972), Italian politician
- Romolo Bizzotto (1925–2017), Italian footballer
