= Zé Turbo =

Bissau-Guinean footballer

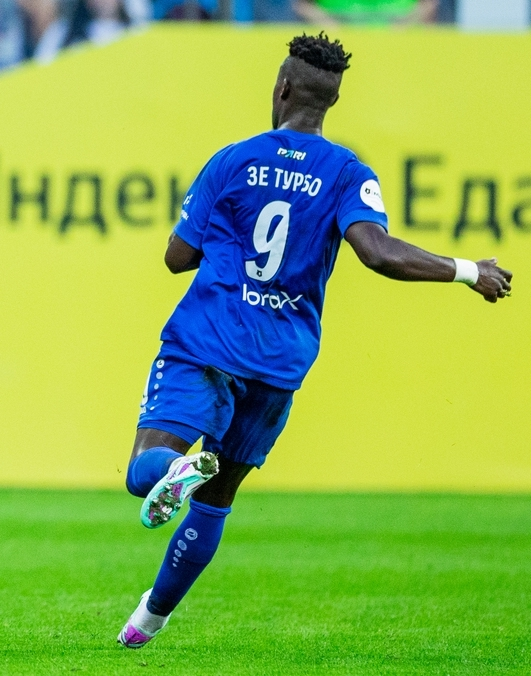
- Zé Turbo playing for Pari NN in 2024

Personal information
- Full name: Júnior José Correia
- Date of birth: 22 October 1996 (age 30)
- Place of birth: Bissau, Guinea-Bissau
- Height: 1.88 m (6 ft 2 in)
- Position: Forward

Team information
- Current team: Oțelul Galați
- Number: 11

Youth career
- 2013–2014: Real SC
- 2014–2015: Sporting CP
- 2015–2016: Inter Milan

Senior career*
Years	Team	Apps	(Gls)
2016–2018	Inter Milan	0	(0)
2016–2017	→ Tondela (loan)	7	(0)
2017	→ Marbella (loan)	13	(0)
2017–2018	→ Catania (loan)	5	(0)
2018	→ Olhanense (loan)	12	(1)
2018–2019	Newell's Old Boys	1	(0)
2019	→ Nacional (loan)	3	(0)
2019–2020	Schaffhausen	18	(2)
2020–2021	Grasshopper	13	(1)
2021–2023	Nantong Zhiyun	64	(34)
2023	Al-Markhiya	10	(4)
2023–2026	Pari NN	37	(6)
2025	→ AEL Limassol (loan)	11	(1)
2025–2026	→ Maccabi Bnei Reineh (loan)	18	(2)
2026–	Oțelul Galați	6	(0)

International career^{‡}
2023–	Guinea-Bissau	18	(1)
- * Club domestic league appearances and goals as of 1 November 2026 ‡ National team caps and goals as of 9 June 2025

Júnior José Correia (born 22 October 1996), better known as Zé Turbo, is a Bissau-Guinean professional footballer who plays as a forward for Liga I club Oțelul Galați.

He was on the books of Sporting and Inter Milan as a teenager, but did not make a senior appearance for either club, instead having loans at lower-league teams in Portugal, Italy and Spain. In 2018 he moved to South America and represented Newell's Old Boys of Argentina and Club Nacional of Paraguay, before having spells in Switzerland, China, Qatar and Russia.

== Club career ==
=== Sporting ===
Zé Turbo was formed at Real Sport Clube before transferring across Lisbon to Sporting Clube de Portugal in 2014. After scoring twice against Maribor in the UEFA Youth League, he signed a five-year contract with a buyout clause of €45 million that November, amidst interest from a host of Italian and English teams and Sporting's rivals Benfica and Porto.

=== Inter Milan ===
In February 2015, he moved to Inter Milan. On 31 May, in the final game of the season at home to Empoli, he was called up to a senior squad for the first time, remaining unused in a 4–3 victory.

On 4 August 2016, Zé Turbo was loaned to Portuguese Primeira Liga team Tondela on a season-long loan. Sixteen days later, he made his professional debut in a match at Chaves, replacing Miguel Cardoso for the final 19 minutes of a 1–1 draw. On 15 January 2017, he was loaned to Marbella in Spain's Segunda División B for the rest of the season. He made his debut for them two weeks later as an 82nd-minute substitute for Kike Márquez in a 3–2 home win over Atlético Mancha Real.

On 24 August 2017, Zé Turbo signed for Serie C club Catania on a season-long loan. He made his debut on 2 September, playing the final nine minutes of a 1–0 loss at Casertana in place of Cristian Caccetta. His loan was terminated on 17 January 2018.

After his time in Catania, Zé Turbo was immediately loaned to S.C. Olhanense of the third-tier Campeonato de Portugal for the remainder of the season. He played 12 games for the team from the Algarve and scored his first senior goal to open a 2–1 win at Clube Olímpico do Montijo on 15 April.

=== South America ===
In July 2018, Zé Turbo moved to Newell's Old Boys of the Argentine Primera División, signing a one-year contract on a free transfer. He made one appearance for the team from Rosario, as a 70th-minute substitute for Luís Leal in a 1–0 loss to Club Atlético Aldosivi on 25 November.

At the start of 2019 he moved on to Club Nacional of the Paraguayan Primera División.

=== Switzerland ===
On 17 July 2019, Zé Turbo returned to Europe and signed a two-year deal with Swiss Challenge League club FC Schaffhausen. Eleven days later he made his debut as a starter the season began with a 2–0 loss at FC Vaduz, being substituted for Karim Barry after 58 minutes. On 5 October he scored his first goal, the game's only away to FC Chiasso.

Remaining in the same league, Zé Turbo cancelled his contract to move to Grasshopper Club Zürich on 17 February 2020, on a deal until 2023. He scored one goal in the remainder of the season, as a substitute in a 5–3 home win over his previous employer on 21 July.

=== Later career ===
In February 2021, Zé Turbo moved to Chinese second-tier club Nantong Zhiyun. Two years later he signed for Al-Markhiya SC in the Qatar Stars League. On 2 August 2023, he returned to Europe with Russian Premier League club Pari NN on a three-year deal. On 22 January 2025, Pari NN loaned him to AEL Limassol in Cyprus.

On 1 August 2026, the player moved to Oțelul Galați from Liga I, signing a two-year contract.

== International career ==
Zé Turbo made his debut for the Guinea-Bissau national football team on 14 June 2023 in a Africa Cup of Nations qualifier against São Tomé and Príncipe, substituting Mama Baldé in the 79th minute. At the 2023 Africa Cup of Nations held the following January, he scored his first international goal as an added-time consolation in a 4–2 group loss to Equatorial Guinea, again as a late replacement.

== Career statistics ==
=== Club ===
As of match played 1 November 2026

Appearances and goals by club, season and competition
Club	Season	League			National Cup (Note: Includes Taça de Portugal, Coppa Italia Serie C, Chinese FA Cup, Amir Cup, Russian Cup, Cypriot Cup, Israel State Cup)		League Cup (Note: Includes Taça da Liga)		Continental		Other		Total	
Club	Season	League	Apps	Goals	Apps	Goals	Apps	Goals	Apps	Goals	Apps	Goals	Apps	Goals
Tondela (loan)	2016–17	Primeira Liga	7	0	2	0	1	0	—		—		10	0
Marbella (loan)	2016–17	Segunda División B	13	0	—		—		—		—		13	0
Catania (loan)	2017–18	Serie C	5	0	2	1	—		—		—		7	1
Olhanense (loan)	2017–18	Campeonato de Portugal	12	1	—		—		—		—		12	1
Newell's Old Boys	2018–19	Argentine Primera División	1	0	0	0	—		—		—		1	0
Nacional (loan)	2019	Paraguayan Primera División	3	0	—		—		0	0	—		3	0
Schaffhausen	2019–20	Swiss Challenge League	18	2	0	0	—		—		—		18	2
Grasshopper	2019–20	Swiss Challenge League	13	1	—		—		—		—		13	1
Grasshopper	2020–21	Swiss Challenge League	0	0	0	0	—		—		—		0	0
Grasshopper	Total		13	1	0	0	—		—		—		13	1
Nantong Zhiyun	2021	China League One	32	14	1	0	—		—		—		33	14
Nantong Zhiyun	2022	China League One	32	20	0	0	—		—		—		32	20
Nantong Zhiyun	Total		64	34	1	0	—		—		—		65	34
Al-Markhiya	2022–23	Qatar Stars League	10	4	1	0	—		—		—		11	4
Pari NN	2023–24	Russian Premier League	23	4	4	0	—		—		2 (Note: Appearances in Russian Premier League promotion/relegation play-offs)	0	29	4
Pari NN	2024–25	Russian Premier League	14	2	6	1	—		—		—		20	3
Pari NN	2025–26	Russian Premier League	0	0	0	0	—		—		—		0	0
Pari NN	Total		37	6	10	1	—		—		2	0	49	7
AEL Limassol (loan)	2024–25	Cypriot First Division	11	1	1	0	—		—		—		12	1
Maccabi Bnei Reineh (loan)	2025–26	Israeli Premier League	18	2	3	0	—		—		—		21	2
Oțelul Galați	2026–27	Liga I	6	0	0	0	—		—		—		6	0
Career total			218	51	20	2	1	0	0	0	2	0	241	53

=== International ===
As of match played 9 June 2025

Appearances and goals by national team and year
National team	Year	Apps	Goals
Guinea-Bissau	2023	2	0
Guinea-Bissau	2024	13	1
Guinea-Bissau	2025	3	0
Total		18	1

Scores and results list Guinea-Bissau's goal tally first, score column indicates score after each Zé Turbo goal.

List of international goals scored by Zé Turbo
No.	Date	Venue	Opponent	Score	Result	Competition
1	18 January 2024	Olympic Stadium of Ebimpé, Abidjan, Ivory Coast	Equatorial Guinea	2–4	2–4	2023 Africa Cup of Nations

== Personal life ==
Two days after his professional debut, Zé Turbo was involved in a car crash in Santa Comba Dão, suffering only light injuries to his arm.

Zé Turbo considered retiring from football after the death of his mother, but continued playing in her memory.
