= Mattia Corradi =

Italian professional footballer

Personal information
- Date of birth: 12 January 1990 (age 36)
- Place of birth: Melzo, Italy
- Height: 1.80 m (5 ft 11 in)
- Positions: Attacking midfielder; striker

Team information
- Current team: FCD Muggiò

Youth career
- –2008: Monza

Senior career*
Years	Team	Apps	(Gls)
2007–2008	Monza	2	(0)
2008–2015	AlbinoLeffe	70	(9)
2009–2010	→ Mezzocorona (loan)	19	(1)
2010–2011	→ Pro Vercelli (loan)	9	(1)
2015–2016	Cuneo	33	(2)
2016–2017	Arezzo	55	(3)
2018–2021	Piacenza	73	(13)
2021	Modena	16	(1)
2021–2022	Feralpisalò	24	(2)
2022–2023	Pro Sesto	33	(5)
2023–2025	Piacenza	45	(2)
2025–2026	US Offanenghese 1933		
2026–	FCD Muggiò		
- * Club domestic league appearances and goals as of 21 October 2026

Mattia Corradi (born 12 January 1990) is an Italian footballer who plays as a attacking midfielder for FCD Muggiò.

== Career ==
=== Monza ===
Born in Melzo, Lombardy, Corradi started his career at Lombard club Monza. He played twice for the first team in 2007–08 Serie C1. Corradi also played game 1, 3 & 4 in Serie C Cup.

=== AlbinoLeffe ===
On 8 August 2008 Corradi was signed by another Lombard team AlbinoLeffe for €250,000 in co-ownership deal in 4-year contract. He spent a season in Primavera reserve team. The reserve team was eliminated by Lazio in the round of 16 of the playoffs. Corradi was signed by the Serie B club outright in June 2009, for €20,000.

On 5 August 2009 Corradi was signed by Mezzocorona in temporary deal. He remained in Lega Pro 2nd Division (ex- Serie C2) in 2010–11 season, for Pro Vercelli. He was sent off in the round 31 and suspended 5 games (later reduced to 4). Pro Vercelli promoted to L.P. Prime Div. (ex- Serie C1) in August 2011 to fill the vacancies. Pro Vercelli also received €16,500 from AlbinoLeffe as premio valorizzazione.

Corradi made 4 appearances for AlbinoLeffe in 2011–12 Serie B. He wore no.17 shirt for the first team during that season. He also signed a new 3-year contract circa 2011. At the end of season the club relegated. Corradi followed the team to play in the third division from 2012 to 2015.

=== Serie C ===
On 25 July 2015 Corradi was signed by Cuneo.

On 4 January 2021, he joined Modena.

On 3 July 2021, he moved to Feralpisalò.

On 5 August 2022, Corradi signed with Pro Sesto.

=== Serie D ===
On 2 August 2023, Corradi returned to Piacenza, recently relegated to Serie D.
