= Roberto Iezzi =

Italian footballer

Personal information
- Date of birth: 9 July 1999 (age 27)
- Place of birth: Crema, Italy
- Height: 1.71 m (5 ft 7 in)
- Position: Right back

Youth career
- Martina
- Pro Vercelli

Senior career*
Years	Team	Apps	(Gls)
2018–2025	Pro Vercelli	176	(2)
- * Club domestic league appearances and goals as of 25 April 2025

Roberto Iezzi (born 9 July 1999) is an Italian professional footballer who plays as a right back.

== Club career ==
Formed in Martina youth system, Sangiorgi joined to Pro Vercelli in 2018, and made his first team debut for Serie C on 21 November 2018 against Alessandria. On 14 May 2021, he extended his contract with the club.
