= Matteo Rizzo (footballer) =

Italian footballer (born 2004)

Personal information
- Date of birth: 10 September 2004 (age 22)
- Place of birth: Verbania, Italy
- Height: 1.89 m (6 ft 2 in)
- Position: Goalkeeper

Team information
- Current team: Cosenza

Youth career
- –2018: San Francesco
- 2018–2021: Gozzano
- 2021: Pro Vercelli

Senior career*
Years	Team	Apps	(Gls)
2021	Gozzano	1	(0)
2021–2025	Pro Vercelli	69	(0)
2024	→ Lumezzane (loan)	0	(0)
2025–2026	Campobasso	3	(0)
2026–	Cosenza	0	(0)

International career^{‡}
2022	Italy U18	1	(0)
2022	Italy U19	1	(0)
- * Club domestic league appearances and goals as of 29 August 2026 ‡ National team caps and goals as of 10 August 2022

Matteo Rizzo (born 10 September 2004) is an Italian professional footballer who plays as a goalkeeper for Serie C Group C club Cosenza.

== Club career ==
Born in Verbania, but raised in Vignone, Rizzo started playing football at the local grassroots club San Francesco, before joining Gozzano in 2018. After several seasons in the club's youth sector, he made his first team debut on 19 June 2021, as he came in as a substitute in the final minutes of the last league match of the season against Folgore Caratese, which ultimately ended in a 3-2 win for his side.

In the summer of 2021, Rizzo joined Pro Vercelli, where he was first assigned to the under-19 squad. However, the following December, the goalkeeper was called-up to the first team by the head coach Franco Lerda, following a streak of injuries occurred to all of the registered senior goalkeepers. He subsequently made his professional debut for the club on 18 December 2021, aged 17, starting and playing the entirety of the Serie C match against Mantova, which ended in a 1-1 draw. Throughout the rest of the 2021–22 season, Rizzo established himself as a regular starter of the first team, as Pro Vercelli reached the promotional play-offs before getting eliminated by Juventus U23 in the second round.

On 26 July 2022, Rizzo signed his first professional contract with Pro Vercelli, penning a two-year deal with an option for a third season.

On 17 January 2024, Rizzo was loaned out to fellow Serie C club Lumezzane until the end of the season.

== International career ==
Rizzo has represented Italy at several youth international levels, having played for the under-18 and under-19 national teams.

== Career statistics ==
=== Club ===
As of match played 19 November 2023

Club	Season	League			Coppa Italia		Other		Total	
Club	Season	Division	Apps	Goals	Apps	Goals	Apps	Goals	Apps	Goals
Gozzano	2020–21	Serie D	1	0	—		0	0	1	0
Pro Vercelli	2021–22	Serie C	15	0	—		2 (Note: Two appearances in Serie C promotion play-offs.)	0	17	0
Pro Vercelli	2022–23	Serie C	27	0	—		0	0	27	0
Pro Vercelli	2023–24	Serie C	2	0	—		0	0	2	0
Lumezzane (loan)	2023–24	Serie C	0	0	—		0	0	0	0
Career total			45	0	0	0	2	0	47	0
