= Pasquale Maiorino =

Italian footballer

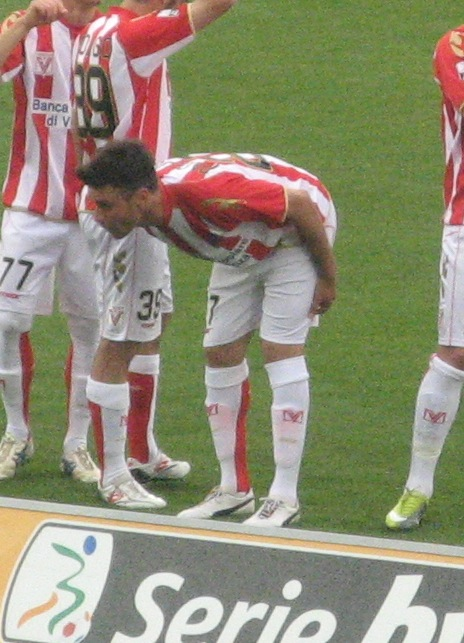

Personal information
- Date of birth: 21 June 1989 (age 37)
- Place of birth: Taranto, Italy
- Height: 1.70 m (5 ft 7 in)
- Position: Forward

Team information
- Current team: Picerno
- Number: 10

Youth career
- Taranto

Senior career*
Years	Team	Apps	(Gls)
2007–2008	Taranto	0	(0)
2007	→ Francavilla Fontana (loan)	1	(0)
2008–2009	Chaux-de-Fonds	0	(0)
2009–2014	Vicenza	33	(3)
2009–2010	→ Lecco (loan)	3	(0)
2010	→ Manfredonia (loan)	11	(2)
2010–2011	→ Brindisi (loan)	28	(3)
2013	→ Modena (loan)	4	(0)
2013–2014	→ Sorrento (loan)	33	(14)
2014–2015	Torres	36	(14)
2015–2017	Cremonese	46	(8)
2017–2021	Livorno	31	(7)
2019–2020	→ Feralpisalò (loan)	38	(8)
2021–2023	Virtus Francavilla	75	(17)
2023–	Picerno	68	(7)
- * Club domestic league appearances and goals as of 1 May 2026

Pasquale Maiorino (born 21 June 1989) is an Italian professional footballer who plays as a forward for Serie C Group C club Picerno.

== Career ==
Born in Taranto, Apulia, Maiorino started his senior career at Taranto. He was the member of the reserve in the first half of 2006–07 season. In the second half he was a player for Francavilla Fontana in Eccellenza Apulia. In summer 2008 Maiorino left for Swiss club Chaux-de-Fonds. The club also signed fellow Italians Juri Toppan and Angelo Bencivenga but they all returned to Italy in January 2009. Maiorino was signed by Vicenza.

=== Vicenza ===
Maiorino was signed by Vicenza in January 2009. Maiorino played 4 times in 2008–09 Serie B as well as few games for the reserve. Since 2009–10 season he was farmed out to Lega Pro (Italian third and fourth division) for Lecco, Manfredonia and Brindisi. Brindisi also received half of the registration rights for a peppercorn of €500, made Vicenza registered a write-down of Maiorino's residual value in accounting for €25,000. In June 2011 Brindisi gave the registration rights back to Vicenza also for €500. Maiorino signed a 3-year contract with the Veneto club. Maiorino also took no.7 shirt for the first team. Maiorino made 20 appearances for Vicenza in 2011–12 Serie B, plus 2 more appearances in relegation "play-out" against Empoli. He was one of the two starting forwards in the first match which ended in a goalless draw and a substitute in the second match which Empoli beat Vicenza in extra time penalty kick. Despite relegation, Vicenza was re-admitted to 2012–13 Serie B in August 2012 for Lecce. However, for Maiorino himself, he only played 9 substitute appearances for the club in the first half of the season. His no.7 shirt also gave to Davide Gavazzi and Maiorino picked no.11 shirt previously owned by Giacomo Tulli. In January 2013, Maiorino moved to fellow second division club Modena in temporary deal with option to co-ownership; defender Maurizio Ciaramitaro moved to Vicenza in temporary deal in exchange.

In June 2013 Vicenza relegated again, as well as Modena against the option to sign the player. In the start of new season, Vicenza also failed to obtain a license to play and only appealed to exclusion by submitting more documents. Despite the financial difficulties on new signing, Maiorino was offloaded to Sorrento on 29 August 2013. On 2 September, defender Raffaele Imparato joined Maiorino in the Southern Italy; Vicenza signed forward Roberto Esposito in exchange on the same day.

=== Lega Pro clubs ===
On 13 August 2014 Imparato and Maiorino were signed by Torres. The club was re-admitted to Lega Pro on 1 August.

On 28 August 2015 Maiorino was signed by Cremonese.

On 10 January 2019, he joined Feralpisalò on loan. The loan was extended on 8 August 2019.

On 21 January 2021, he signed a 2.5-year contract with Virtus Francavilla.
