= Marco Di Fatta =

Italian footballer

Personal information
- Date of birth: 3 March 1988 (age 38)
- Place of birth: Palermo, Italy
- Height: 1.90 m (6 ft 3 in)
- Position: Centre back

Youth career
- 198–2006: Catania

Senior career*
Years	Team	Apps	(Gls)
2006–2007	Catania	0	(0)
2007–2008	Sansovino	25	(0)
2008–2009	Pistoiese	7	(0)
2009–2010	Taranto	0	(0)
2010	→ Potenza (loan)	2	(0)
2010–2011	Milazzo	5	(1)
2011	ASD Interpiana Calcio	9	(0)
2017–2019	ASD Oratorio SS Ciro E Giorgio		
Total		48	(1)
- * Club domestic league appearances and goals

Marco Di Fatta (born 3 March 1988) is an Italian former footballer who plays as a centre back.

== Club career ==
=== Calcio Catania ===
Di Fatta began his youth career with Sicilian club, Calcio Catania, after being born and raised in Palermo, Sicily. He spent many years within the club's youth ranks and graduated from the youth academy in June 2007. Di Fatta never made a senior appearance for Catania prior to being transferred.

=== Co-ownership Deals ===
In July 2007 Di Fatta was transferred to Sansovino on a co-ownership deal, where he spent the 2007-08 statistical season. He went on to make 25 appearances for the club prior to his return to Catania on 1 July 2008 after the resolution of the joint ownership. He was then sold to A.C. Pistoiese on another co-ownership deal that same month. After just seven appearances with the club, Di Fatta suffered a season-long injury which ruled him out of the remainder of the 2008-09 Lega Pro season. His contract was again resolved in favor of Catania the following summer, and the 50% of his contract was sold once more.

In July 2009, Di Fatta joined A.S. Taranto Calcio on a similar co-ownership arrangement. He joined the club alongside fellow Catania teammates Raffaele Imparato (loan) and Adriano Mezavilla (co-ownership). Another serious injury ruled Di Fatta out for much of the 2009–10 season as well, and Taranto opted to loan the player out. On 4 January 2010, he was loaned to Potenza S.C. on a 6-month loan deal, in hope of a career-revival. The injury, however, limited the player to just 2 league appearances for the club. At the end of season Calcio Catania and A.S. Taranto Calcio failed to agree on a price for the contracts of Mezavilla and Di Fatta, and therefore, on 25 June both clubs submitted their bids in sealed envelopes to the Lega Calcio. On the next day, the Lega Calcio announced that Taranto purchased Mezavilla outright and Di Fatta returned to Catania.

=== S.S. Milazzo ===
In July 2010 Di Fatta was then sold on yet another co-ownership agreement to Lega Pro Seconda Divisione side, Milazzo, along with Nicola Lanzolla, Rocco Benci, and Antonio Carrozza. Di Fatta's re-occurring injury troubles left the player with just 4 appearances for the fourth division side, and on 1 July 2011, Di Fatta was released. He has since remained unemployed.
