= Claudio Coralli =

Italian footballer (born 1983)

Personal information
- Date of birth: 1 March 1983 (age 43)
- Place of birth: Borgo San Lorenzo, Italy
- Height: 1.76 m (5 ft 9 in)
- Position: Forward

Team information
- Current team: Aglianese

Youth career
- Empoli

Senior career*
Years	Team	Apps	(Gls)
2002–2007	Empoli	3	(0)
2002–2003	→ Tivoli (loan)	16	(0)
2003–2004	→ Meda (loan)	31	(7)
2004–2006	→ Pizzighettone (loan)	67	(25)
2006	→ Lucchese (loan)	17	(3)
2007–2008	Cittadella	29	(19)
2008–2013	Empoli	88	(34)
2012	→ Cremonese (loan)	7	(2)
2013–2016	Cittadella	88	(22)
2016–2017	Reggina	34	(13)
2017–2019	Carrarese	48	(11)
2019	Alessandria	12	(1)
2019	Messina	11	(2)
2019–	Aglianese	3	(0)
- * Club domestic league appearances and goals as of 14:22, 30 January 2020 (UTC)

Claudio Coralli (born 1 March 1983) is an Italian footballer who currently plays as a forward for Serie D club Aglianese Calcio 1923.

== Club career ==
He was sold to Pizzighettone in a co-ownership deal.

On 27 August 2019, he joined Serie D club Messina.

== Personal life ==
He is the son of Sandra Coralli and Claudio Coralli Sr.
