= Stefano Salvi =

Italian footballer

Personal information
- Date of birth: 2 January 1987 (age 39)
- Place of birth: Rome, Italy
- Height: 1.80 m (5 ft 11 in)
- Position: Midfielder

Team information
- Current team: Martina
- Number: 17

Youth career
- –2006: Lazio
- 2006: Internazionale

Senior career*
Years	Team	Apps	(Gls)
2006–2007	Città di Jesolo	25	(3)
2007	Sassuolo	0	(0)
2007–2010	Como		
2010–2011	Sanremese	22	(1)
2011–2012	Como	28	(0)
2012–2013	Treviso	9	(0)
2013	Sorrento	9	(1)
2013–2016	Lecce	69	(4)
2016–2017	Juve Stabia	18	(0)
2017–2018	Bassano	31	(0)
2018–2019	LR Vicenza	12	(0)
2019–2021	Foggia	37	(0)
2021–2022	Legnago Salus	18	(0)
2022–	Martina	3	(0)
- * Club domestic league appearances and goals as of 18 September 2022

Stefano Salvi (born 2 January 1987) is an Italian professional footballer who plays as a midfielder for Serie D club Martina.

== Club career ==
Formed in Lazio and Internazionale's youth systems, Salvi started his senior career in Serie D club Città di Jesolo.

On 2007 he joined Como, and made his professional debut for Serie C1 on 23 August 2009 against Monza.

On 2 August 2019, he signed for Foggia.

On 21 July 2021, he joined Legnago Salus.
