= Andrea Bovo =

Italian footballer (born 1986)

Personal information
- Date of birth: 14 May 1986 (age 40)
- Place of birth: Mestre, Venice, Italy
- Height: 1.83 m (6 ft 0 in)
- Position: Midfielder

Youth career
- 2004–2005: Venezia

Senior career*
Years	Team	Apps	(Gls)
2004–2005	Venezia	14	(0)
2005–2007	Palermo	0	(0)
2005–2006	→ Salernitana (loan)	22	(1)
2006–2007	→ Bari (loan)	1	(0)
2007	→ Padova (loan)	15	(0)
2007–2012	Padova	171	(11)
2012–2014	Spezia	56	(3)
2014	Pescara	12	(0)
2014–2016	Salernitana	52	(2)
2016–2018	Reggiana	76	(5)
2018–2019	Viterbese	7	(0)
2019	Vicenza Virtus	13	(1)
2019–2020	Virtus Francavilla	19	(1)
2020	→ Siena (loan)	3	(0)
2020–2021	Juve Stabia	20	(0)
2021–2022	Nocerina	26	(1)
Total		507	(25)

International career
2002	Italy U16	3	(1)
2002–2003	Italy U17	14	(1)
2004	Italy U18	5	(0)
2004–2005	Italy U19	9	(1)
2005	Italy U20	1	(0)

Managerial career
- 2024–2025: Salernitana (youth)
- * Club domestic league appearances and goals

Andrea Bovo (born 14 May 1986) is an Italian football coach and former footballer.

== Biography ==
Born in Mestre, the mainland part of Venice (Italian: Venezia) municipality, Bovo started his career at Serie B side A.C. Venezia. After he made his first team debut in 2nd half of 2003–04 season, he was signed by Serie A side Palermo in a co-ownership deal but loaned back to Venice. Palermo got the remain registration rights after the bankrupt of AC Venezia and loaned him to Serie C1 side Salernitana.

In the next season, he left for Serie B side Bari on loan. But he just played once in the league on 19 February 2006, replaced Ivan Rajčić against Rimini, which the match ended in 2–2 draw.

=== Padova ===
In January 2007 he left for Serie C1 side Padova in another loan deal, there he started to play as a regular starter.

In summer 2007, Padova signed Bovo's 50% registration rights after the co-ownership deal was accepted, for €250,000. In June 2008, Padova bought the rights from Palermo after won the auction, for €426,000. He won promotion playoffs to Serie B in 2009.

=== Spezia ===
On 27 June 2012 Bovo was signed by Spezia Calcio.

=== Pescara ===
On 31 January 2014 he was signed by Pescara.

=== Salernitana ===
On 9 October 2014 he was signed by Salernitana as a free agent.

=== Serie C clubs ===
On 4 August 2016 he joined Serie C club Reggiana for an undisclosed fee.

On 22 August 2018 he joined Serie C club Viterbese.

On 31 January 2019 he signed with Vicenza Virtus.

On 24 July 2019, he signed with Virtus Francavilla. On 31 January 2020, he was loaned to Siena.

On 5 October 2020 he moved to Juve Stabia.

=== Serie D ===
On 9 September 2021, he joined Nocerina in Serie D.

=== International career ===
Bovo was capped for Italy U17 team at 2003 UEFA European Under-17 Football Championship. He also played at Italy U19 team at 2005 UEFA European Under-19 Football Championship qualification.
