= Giuseppe Madonia =

Italian footballer

Personal information
- Date of birth: 14 March 1983 (age 43)
- Place of birth: Palermo, Italy
- Height: 1.78 m (5 ft 10 in)
- Position: Forward

Senior career*
| Years | Team | Apps | (Gls) |
| 2002 | Belpasso | 15 | (5) |
| 2003 | Cefalù | 14 | (10) |
| 2003 | Alcamo | 6 | (3) |
| 2004 | Bagheria | 20 | (18) |
| 2004–2005 | Carini | 25 | (23) |
| 2005–2006 | Giarre | | |
| 2006 | Pistoiese | 3 | (0) |
| 2007 | Vibonese | 5 | (0) |
| 2007 | Carini | 8 | (3) |
| 2008– | Licata | 14 | (6) |
| 2008–2009 | Adrano | 34 | (21) |
| 2009 | Vigor Lamezia | 14 | (4) |
| 2009–2010 | Acireale | | |
| 2010–2013 | Trapani | 100 | (32) |
| 2014 | Catanzaro | 13 | (1) |
| 2014–2015 | Matera | 38 | (12) |
| 2015–2016 | Akragas | 30 | (5) |
| 2016–2017 | Messina | 29 | (4) |
| 2017–2018 | Virtus Francavilla | 30 | (4) |
| 2018–2019 | Acireale | 33 | (6) |
| 2019–2020 | Cus Palermo | | |
- * Club domestic league appearances and goals as of 13:34, 3 March 2020 (UTC)

Giuseppe Madonia (born 14 March 1983) is a retired Italian football player.

== Club career ==
He made his Serie C debut for Trapani on 11 September 2011 in a game against Piacenza.

On 16 August 2018 he rejoined Serie D club Acireale. He left the club in the summer 2019 and then joined Cus Palermo on 27 September 2019. Madonia announced his retirement from football in March 2020.
