= Davide Raffaello =

Italian footballer (born 1988)

Personal information
- Date of birth: 24 April 1988 (age 38)
- Place of birth: Latina, Italy
- Height: 1.82 m (5 ft 11 1/2 in)
- Position: Midfielder

Team information
- Current team: San Nicolò Notaresco

Youth career
- Latina

Senior career*
Years	Team	Apps	(Gls)
2005	Latina	1	(0)
2006–2008	Ascoli	3	(0)
2008–2009	Viareggio	10	(0)
2009–2012	Isola Liri	60	(12)
2012–2015	Lupa Roma	89	(21)
2015–2017	Trapani	36	(0)
2017–2019	FeralpiSalò	26	(2)
2019–	San Nicolò Notaresco	8	(0)
- * Club domestic league appearances and goals as of 13:38, 12 April 2020 (UTC)

Davide Raffaello (born 24 April 1988) is an Italian football player who plays for Serie D club San Nicolò Notaresco.

== Club career ==
He made his professional debut in the Serie B for Ascoli in the 2007–08 season.

On 29 January 2019, he was released from his contract with FeralpiSalò by mutual consent. He remained without club until December 2019, where he signed with Serie D club San Nicolò Notaresco.
