= Vittorio Bernardo =

Italian football player

Personal information
- Date of birth: 2 February 1986 (age 40)
- Place of birth: Erice, Italy
- Height: 1.81 m (5 ft 11 in)
- Position: Forward

Team information
- Current team: Dattilo Noir

Youth career
- –2004: Messina

Senior career*
| Years | Team | Apps | (Gls) |
| 2004–2008 | Messina | 7 | (0) |
| 2005–2006 | → Juve Stabia (loan) | 17 | (1) |
| 2006–2007 | → Martina Franca (loan) | 14 | (1) |
| 2008–2011 | Cavese | 84 | (15) |
| 2011–2012 | Latina | 25 | (2) |
| 2012–2013 | Sorrento | 20 | (5) |
| 2013–2014 | Teramo | 14 | (4) |
| 2014 | Messina | 14 | (5) |
| 2014–2015 | Paganese | 15 | (0) |
| 2015 | Catanzaro | 8 | (4) |
| 2015–2017 | Viterbese | 37 | (11) |
| 2017 | Sambenedettese | 12 | (2) |
| 2017–2018 | Siracusa | 33 | (3) |
| 2018– | Dattilo Noir | | |
- * Club domestic league appearances and goals as of 6 May 2018

Vittorio Bernardo (born 2 February 1986) is an Italian former footballer.

== Club career ==
He made his Serie A debut for Messina on 28 November 2004 in a game against Fiorentina.

On 5 October 2018, he signed with an Eccellenza (fifth-tier) club Dattilo Noir.
