= Bruno Iotti =

Brazilian footballer (born 1987)

Personal information
- Full name: Bruno Demetrio Iotti
- Date of birth: January 15, 1987 (age 39)
- Place of birth: Jundiaí, São Paulo, Brazil
- Height: 1.75 m (5 ft 9 in)
- Position: Midfielder

Youth career
- 2005–2006: Paraná

Senior career*
Years	Team	Apps	(Gls)
2007	Paraná		
2008–2010	Ituano		
2010	Iraty		
2010	Paraná		
2010	União São João		
2011	Bragantino		
2012	Itabaiana		
2012–2013	Bragantino		
2014–2016	Sergipe		
2016–2017	Doxa Drama		
- * Club domestic league appearances and goals

Bruno Demetrio Iotti or simply Bruno Iotti (born January 15, 1987), is a Brazilian former professional footballer who played as a midfielder.

== Career ==
Iotti began his career at Paraná Clube, but it was in Sergipe state football that he gained the most prominence, winning the state championship twice, with AO Itabaiana and CS Sergipe. His last club was Doxa Drama in Greece.

After retiring as a professional, he began playing in the amateur league of his hometown, Jundiaí.

== Honours ==
Itabaiana

- Campeonato Sergipano: 2012

Sergipe

- Campeonato Sergipano: 2016
