= Alessandro Carosso =

Italian footballer (born 2002)

Personal information
- Date of birth: 2 February 2002 (age 24)
- Place of birth: Turin, Italy
- Position: Defender

Team information
- Current team: Pro Vercelli
- Number: 77

Youth career
- Pro Vercelli

Senior career*
Years	Team	Apps	(Gls)
2019–	Pro Vercelli	83	(1)
2022	→ Vibonese (loan)	13	(0)
2022–2023	→ Fermana (loan)	27	(0)
2024	→ Fermana (loan)	13	(0)
- * Club domestic league appearances and goals as of 30 April 2026

Alessandro Carosso (born 2 February 2002) is an Italian professional footballer who plays as a defender for Serie C Group A club Pro Vercelli.

== Club career ==
On 19 January 2022, he joined Vibonese on loan.

On 24 August 2022, Carosso was loaned by Fermana. On 1 February 2024, Carosso returned on another loan to Fermana.

== Career statistics ==
=== Club ===
As of match played 21 October 2021

Appearances and goals by club, season and competition
Club	Season	League			National Cup		League Cup		Other		Total	
Club	Season	Division	Apps	Goals	Apps	Goals	Apps	Goals	Apps	Goals	Apps	Goals
Pro Vercelli	2019–20	Serie C	13	0	1	0	2	0	—		16	0
Pro Vercelli	2020–21	Serie C	5	0	—		—		—		5	0
Pro Vercelli	2021–22	Serie C	2	0	—		2	0	—		4	0
Pro Vercelli	Total		20	0	1	0	4	0	0	0	25	0
Career total			20	0	1	0	4	0	0	0	25	0
