= Marcos Espeche =

Argentine footballer

Personal information
- Date of birth: 18 June 1985 (age 41)
- Place of birth: Córdoba, Argentina
- Height: 1.79 m (5 ft 10 in)
- Position: Defender

Senior career*
Years	Team	Apps	(Gls)
2010–2011	Forte dei Marmi		
2011–2018	Lucchese		
2018–2019	Gubbio	34	(1)
2019–2021	Reggiana	46	(0)
2021–2025	Pontedera	128	(2)
- * Club domestic league appearances and goals as of 27 April 2025

Marcos Espeche (born 18 June 1985) is an Argentine footballer who plays as a defender.

== Career ==
He spent most of his career in the lower divisions of Italian football.

He made his Serie B debut for Reggiana on 27 September 2020 in a game against Pisa, at the age of 35.

On 16 June 2021, he signed with Pontedera.
