= Giulio Bizzotto =

Italian footballer

Personal information
- Date of birth: 15 October 1996 (age 30)
- Place of birth: Thiene, Italy
- Height: 1.70 m (5 ft 7 in)
- Position: Forward

Team information
- Current team: Cartigliano
- Number: 16

Youth career
- 2004–2015: Cittadella

Senior career*
Years	Team	Apps	(Gls)
2015–2019	Cittadella	15	(4)
2016–2017	→ FeralpiSalò (loan)	10	(0)
2017	→ Renate (loan)	9	(0)
2018	→ Viterbese (loan)	5	(0)
2019–	Cartigliano	2	(1)
- * Club domestic league appearances and goals as of 18 March 2019

Giulio Bizzotto (born 15 October 1996) is an Italian footballer who plays as a forward for Serie D club Cartigliano.

== Career ==
Bizzotto began his career with A.S. Cittadella. He was first included in a matchday squad on 25 April 2015, remaining an unused substitute in a goalless draw away to Brescia in Serie B. His debut came on 9 May at the Stadio Pier Cesare Tombolato, replacing Daniele Bazzoffia in the 71st minute and nine minutes later netting an equaliser for a 1–1 draw with Frosinone. In a season which ended in relegation to Lega Pro, he made only one more appearance, in a 0–2 home defeat to Perugia 13 days later.

On 2 August 2015, in the first round of the Coppa Italia, Bizzotto netted four goals in a 15–0 home win over Potenza, two goals in either half. A week later in the second round, he opened a 2–0 win at Teramo. He eventually finished the 2015–16 season as the top-scorer of the Coppa Italia, with five goals.

On 8 January 2019, he moved to Cartigliano in the Serie D.

== Honours ==
=== Individual ===
- Coppa Italia top goalscorer: 2015–16
