= Alessandro Gatto =

Italian footballer (born 1994)

Personal information
- Date of birth: 2 February 1994 (age 32)
- Place of birth: Taranto, Italy
- Height: 1.80 m (5 ft 11 in)
- Position: Forward

Team information
- Current team: Fidelis Andria
- Number: 91

Youth career
- –2012: Lecce
- 2013–2014: Verona

Senior career*
Years	Team	Apps	(Gls)
2012	Martina Franca	0	(0)
2013	Taranto	6	(3)
2014–2016	Verona	0	(0)
2014–2015	→ Modena (loan)	3	(0)
2015	→ Pordenone (loan)	7	(0)
2015–2016	→ Juve Stabia (loan)	19	(0)
2016–2017	Monopoli	35	(7)
2017–2018	Südtirol	21	(0)
2018–2019	Arzachena	35	(3)
2019–2020	Bisceglie	27	(6)
2020–2021	Catania	4	(0)
2021	→ Cavese (loan)	15	(0)
2021	Trapani	11	(4)
2021–2022	Casale	14	(5)
2022	Casarano	14	(2)
2022–2023	Legnago	19	(6)
2023–2024	Chieti	26	(3)
2024–2025	Nardò	33	(9)
2025–	Fidelis Andria	13	(2)
- * Club domestic league appearances and goals as of 15 March 2026

Alessandro Gatto (born 2 February 1994) is an Italian football player who plays for Serie D club Fidelis Andria.

== Club career ==
He made his Serie B debut for Modena on 4 October 2014 in a game against Bari.

On 30 July 2019, he signed a 2-year contract with Bisceglie.

On 5 September 2020 he joined Catania on a 2-year contract. On 11 January 2021 he was loaned to Cavese.
