= Mirco Petrella =

Italian footballer

Personal information
- Date of birth: 30 July 1993 (age 33)
- Place of birth: Pratola Peligna, Italy
- Height: 1.64 m (5 ft 5 in)
- Position: Winger

Team information
- Current team: Desenzano

Youth career
- Pescara

Senior career*
Years	Team	Apps	(Gls)
2011–2013	Pescara	0	(0)
2011–2013	→ Teramo (loan)	58	(11)
2013–2017	Teramo	112	(11)
2017–2019	Triestina	59	(14)
2019–2020	Südtirol	23	(3)
2020–2022	Triestina	29	(7)
2022–2023	Ancona	22	(4)
2023–2024	Pro Vercelli	18	(2)
2024–	Desenzano	0	(0)
- * Club domestic league appearances and goals as of 3 May 2024

Mirco Petrella (born 30 July 1993) is an Italian professional footballer who plays as a winger for Serie D club Desenzano.

== Club career ==
Formed in Delfino Pescara youth sector, Petrella made his professional debut for Teramo in 2012.

On 10 August 2017, he signed for Triestina.

In 2019, he joined Südtirol, and played 23 matches in Serie C.

On 9 August 2020, he left Südtirol and returned to Triestina.

On 27 June 2022, Petrella signed a two-year contract with Ancona.

On 29 August 2023, Petrella moved to Pro Vercelli.
