= Pietro Visconti =

Italian association football player

Personal information
- Date of birth: 24 May 1989 (age 37)
- Place of birth: Fiorenzuola d'Arda, Italy
- Height: 1.86 m (6 ft 1 in)
- Position: Left-back

Team information
- Current team: Fidentina

Youth career
- Piacenza

Senior career*
| Years | Team | Apps | (Gls) |
| 2009–2012 | Piacenza | 31 | (1) |
| 2009–2011 | → Pavia (loan) | 45 | (2) |
| 2012–2014 | Cremonese | 47 | (2) |
| 2014–2016 | Avellino | 48 | (0) |
| 2016–2018 | Trapani | 41 | (0) |
| 2018–2020 | Novara | 32 | (1) |
| 2020 | Pontedera | 6 | (0) |
| 2021– | Fidentina | | |
- * Club domestic league appearances and goals as of 15:49, 24 September 2020 (UTC)

Pietro Visconti (born 24 May 1989) is an Italian football player who plays for Fidentina.

== Club career ==
He made his professional debut in the Serie B for Piacenza on 30 May 2009 in a game against Vicenza.

On 16 January 2020 he agreed on a contract with Serie C club Pontedera.
