= Ilario Iotti =

Italian footballer

Personal information
- Date of birth: 10 May 1995 (age 31)
- Place of birth: Ascoli Piceno, Italy
- Height: 1.69 m (5 ft 7 in)
- Position: Winger

Team information
- Current team: Pro Vercelli
- Number: 8

Youth career
- Ascoli

Senior career*
Years	Team	Apps	(Gls)
2013–2017	Ascoli	12	(0)
2015	→ Matelica (loan)	17	(1)
2015–2016	→ Fermana (loan)	33	(3)
2016–2017	→ ASD Monticelli (loan)	31	(5)
2017–2021	Fermana	84	(3)
2021–	Pro Vercelli	143	(8)
2021–2022	→ Triestina (loan)	34	(0)
- * Club domestic league appearances and goals as of 30 April 2026

Ilario Iotti (born 10 May 1995) is an Italian professional footballer who plays as a winger for Serie C Group A club Pro Vercelli.

== Club career ==
Formed as a player in Ascoli Calcio, Iotti made his first team and Serie C1 debut on 22 September 2013 against L'Aquila.

After he was sent on loan to Serie D clubs Matelica and Fermana for the next two seasons.

On 15 June 2017, he left Ascoli and signed for Fermana. He spend four seasons for his new club, and plays more than 100 matches for the team.

On 23 July 2021, he joined to Pro Vercelli on exchange for Simone Moschin. On 31 August 2021, he was loaned to Triestina.
