= FC Sangiuseppese =

Italian football club

Sangiuseppese
- Full name: Football Club Sangiuseppese
- Founded: 1936
- Dissolved: 2008
- Ground: Stadio Campo Comunale Murialdo, San Giuseppe Vesuviano, Italy
Home colours

Football Club Sangiuseppese was an Italian association football club located in San Giuseppe Vesuviano, Campania.

It was founded in 1936 in San Giuseppe Vesuviano as Football Club Sangiuseppese and it played here from 1936 until 2008. After its bankruptcy in 2008 it was taken over and renamed Football Club Neapolis Mugnano and played in Mugnano di Napoli.

== History ==
=== Foundation ===
The club started its life as Football Club Sangiuseppese, it was founded in 1936 in the Province of Naples town San Giuseppe Vesuviano. The club wore yellow and blue shirts, known in Italy as gialloblù, starting their league performances in Terza Divisione. These early seasons were not very successful and the club commonly finished bottom.

Sangiuseppese eventually gained promotion to Seconda Divisione in 1939, their efforts in Second Divisione saw them reach the quarter-finals of the end-grouping. For a brief period after World War II, the club played in Serie C for the 1946–47 and 1947–48 seasons. After that the club fell into obscurity.

1970–71 saw the club return to more notable success, they were competing in Seconda Categoria and won promotion from it to the Prima Categoria. Four years after this, the club achieved another promotion and they were placed into the Promozione Campania; club trainers during this period included Montalto, Improta, Sgambato, Ambrosio and Lovless respectively.

Sangiuseppese won promotion up into the Interregionale league after 1980–81, today's equivalent is Serie D. Spilabotte's goals helped the club during the two seasons they spent up in it. They competed against clubs such as Crotone, Juve Stabia and Savoia before being relegated.

The relegation itself in 1982–83 was difficult for the club to take as two teams who survived had the same number of points as them, but Sangiuseppese had a worse goal difference. After their relegation the club played in regional competitions such as Promozione Campania and would only gain promotion from it in 1988–89.

=== Pro Sangiuseppese in Serie C2 ===
For the first time in their history, the club gained promotion from Serie D after just one season back in the league, this meant Sangiuseppese would be competing in Serie C2. In this division they performed respectably, ending 3rd in their first season, missing out on promotion to Ischia Isolaverde and Acireale.

The following two seasons, they did not pose a threat in the championship race, but consistently finished in the top half of the table. By 1994 the club had begun to decline in form and just a year later they suffered a relegation to Serie D (known as C.N.D. at the time). They were unable to bounce straight back to Serie C2 and after a mid-table finish, Sangiuseppese became defunct because of financial difficulties in 1996.

However, by 1997 the club had been refounded under the name Pro Sangiuseppese after a team from the city called Scalese took action to rename their club to carry on the legacy of Sangiuseppese; Pro Sangiuseppese started their first season back in the Promozione Campania, which was successfully captured in the 1997–98 season. This was followed up by becoming champions of Eccellenza Campania, beating out Ottaviano by one point.

Into the new millennium Pro Sangiuseppese were back in Serie D, returning with a 4th-place finish above established regional sides such as Sorrento and Frosinone. Although promotion eluded them, on the field the 2000s were somewhat of a stable time for the club; they finished in the top 10 for seven consecutive seasons. Off the field, Sangiuseppese were having problems and became bankrupt in 2006.
