= Nicola Talamo =

Italian footballer

Personal information
- Date of birth: 8 April 1996 (age 30)
- Place of birth: Pozzuoli, Italy
- Height: 1.78 m (5 ft 10 in)
- Position: Forward

Team information
- Current team: Ischia
- Number: 7

Youth career
- Monteruscello

Senior career*
Years	Team	Apps	(Gls)
2013–2015	Monteruscello	0	(0)
2013–2014	→ Sora (loan)	27	(7)
2014–2015	→ Latina (loan)	9	(0)
2015–2017	Latina	4	(0)
2016	→ Maceratese (loan)	5	(0)
2016–2017	→ Siracusa (loan)	15	(0)
2017	→ Cremonese (loan)	1	(0)
2017–2018	Cremonese	0	(0)
2017–2018	→ Paganese (loan)	32	(4)
2018–2019	Alessandria	18	(0)
2019	→ Siracusa (loan)	9	(0)
2019–2020	Corigliano	23	(9)
2020–2023	Nocerina	83	(22)
2023–	Ischia	5	(4)
- * Club domestic league appearances and goals as of 8 October 2023

Nicola Talamo (born 8 April 1996) is an Italian footballer who plays for Ischia in Serie D.

== Club career ==
Born in Pozzuoli, in the Province of Naples, Talamo started his career at local side Monteruscello Calcio. In 2013 he left for Serie D club Sora on loan. In 2014 Talamo was signed by Serie B club Latina, initially on loan. He played 13 first team appearances for Latina in Serie B, as well as for the reserve team of Latina (4 games and 4 goals as an overage player for the reserves in 2015–16 season) From January 2016 to June 2017 he left the club on loan to Maceratese, Siracusa and Cremonese.

Latina went bankrupted in 2017. Talamo became a free agent on 29 May 2017.

On 29 June 2017 Talamo signed a 2-year contract with Cremonese.

On 2 September 2019, his contract with Alessandria was dissolved by mutual consent.
