= Adriano Mezavilla =

Brazilian footballer (born 1983)

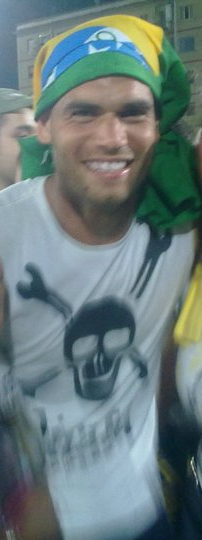

Personal information
- Full name: Adriano Sartorio Mezavilla
- Date of birth: 14 January 1983 (age 43)
- Place of birth: Maringá, Brazil
- Height: 1.84 m (6 ft 0 in)
- Position: Midfielder

Team information
- Current team: Ferentino

Senior career*
| Years | Team | Apps | (Gls) |
| 2002–2004 | Lanciano | 55 | (5) |
| 2005–2006 | Catania | 6 | (0) |
| 2005–2006 | → Perugia (loan) | 23 | (2) |
| 2006–2008 | Cesena | 35 | (1) |
| 2008 | → Pisa (loan) | 12 | (0) |
| 2008–2009 | Catania | 0 | (0) |
| 2008–2009 | → Perugia (loan) | 20 | (1) |
| 2009–2010 | Taranto | 16 | (1) |
| 2010 | → Andria BAT (loan) | 12 | (0) |
| 2010–2014 | Juve Stabia | 76 | (7) |
| 2014–2017 | Alessandria | 92 | (13) |
| 2017–2018 | Reggina | 27 | (1) |
| 2018–2020 | Juve Stabia | 37 | (7) |
| 2020–2022 | Sorrento | 60 | (9) |
| 2022–2023 | Vico Equense | | |
| 2023– | Ferentino | | |
- * Club domestic league appearances and goals as of 15 October 2026

Adriano Sartorio Mezavilla (born 14 January 1983) is a Brazilian footballer who plays as a midfielder for Ferentino.

== Career ==
Mezavilla began his adventure in Italy, with S.S. Lanciano in January 2002, when he signed for the Italian side, along with compatriots Adriano Ferreira Pinto and Paulo Jorge Cassova Ribeiro. The midfielder soon broke into the starting eleven, and went on to remain with his club until January 2005. In his 3-year spell with Lanciano, Mezavilla made nearly 70 appearances in all competitions and scored 6 goals. After several impressive displays with the club, his performances caught the eyes of several transfer gurus in the higher divisions, and in January 2005, he transferred to Sicilian side, Calcio Catania, who were, at the time, playing in the Serie B.

In January 2005, Mezavilla officially transferred to the Sicilian club, during the winter transfer market. During the remainder of the 2004-05 Serie B season, the midfielder made just 6 appearances, without scoring. After six months in Sicily, however, Catania opted to loan him to Perugia Calcio in July 2005 for the 2005–06 season. During his loan spell with Perugia, Mezavilla was a protagonist and went on to make 25 appearances for the club, scoring 3 goals. On 30 June 2006, Mezavilla returned to Catania.

In July 2006, he was sold to Serie B side, A.C. Cesena in joint-ownership bid, and he remained in Cesena until January 2008, when he was loaned out to Pisa Calcio. During his stint with Cesena, Mezavilla scored 1 goal in 35 appearances, but found first team football limited and hence, his loan deal with Pisa Calcio. With the northern Italian side, he would make 12 total appearances in that six-month spell. Following his spell with Pisa, he returned to Cesena, but his co-ownership deal was terminated by Calcio Catania, and he returned to the Sicilian club, who were now playing in the Serie A.

On 7 July 2008 the co-ownership was officially terminated by Catania and they bought back Mezavilla outright. As the season neared, Catania opted not to keep the player, and coach Walter Zenga decided to instantly loan the player to former club Perugia Calcio. In the entirety of the 2008–2009 season, Mezavilla made 20 Serie C1 appearances, scoring a single goal. At the conclusion of the season, the player again returned to Sicily.

On 1 July 2009 Mezavilla returned again, to Catania. After training with the first team and taking part in pre-season friendlies, it was assumed that Mezavilla would remain at Catania, under new coach Gianluca Atzori, however, on 31 July 2009, Mezavilla, along with Catania teammates Raffaele Imparato and Marco Di Fatta were sent to Taranto Sport. Mezavilla and Di Fatta were sold in joint-ownership deals whilst Imparato was sent out on loan.

After maintaining a starting position, and making 16 appearances and scoring 1 goal during the first portion of the 2009–10 season, Mezavilla was surprisingly sent out to AS Andria BAT, on loan, as the club were looking to strengthen their squad in order to avoid relegation. With the Lega Pro club, Mezavilla managed an additional 12 Lega Pro appearances. On 1 July 2010, Mezavilla is set to return to Taranto, but it is unknown as to where his future lies. Is therefore transferred to Juve Stabia where he will play until June 2014. That summer passes to Alessandria.

On 31 August 2018, he returned to Juve Stabia, signing a one-year contract with one-year extension option.

In the summer of 2020 he moved to Sorrento.
