= Dario Polverini =

Italian footballer (born 1987)

Personal information
- Full name: Dario Alberto Polverini
- Date of birth: 6 April 1987 (age 39)
- Place of birth: Anzio, Italy
- Height: 1.84 m (6 ft 0 in)
- Position: Defender

Youth career
- Roma

Senior career*
Years	Team	Apps	(Gls)
2007–2008	Roma	0	(0)
2007–2008	→ Prato (loan)	19	(0)
2008–2014	Pro Patria	100	(5)
2010	→ Andria (loan)	4	(0)
2014–2015	Real Vicenza	23	(0)
2015–2018	Pisa	24	(0)
2017	→ Modena (loan)	4	(0)
2018	Fondi	11	(0)
2018–2019	Pro Piacenza	5	(0)
2019	Virtus Verona	0	(0)
- * Club domestic league appearances and goals

Dario Alberto Polverini (born 6 April 1987) is a former Italian footballer.

== Biography ==
Born in Anzio, the Province of Rome, he started his career at A.S. Roma. After played at their Primavera Under-20 team in 2006–07 season, he left for Prato on loan.

On 25 July 2008, he was loaned to Pro Patria with option sign him in a co-ownership deal for €100,000, net of VAT. He only able to play 7 league matches.

On 12 August 2009, Pro Patria (with a new company structure) decided to sign him in a co-ownership deal for an undisclosed fee. In January 2010, he was loaned to Andria. In June 2010 Roma gave up the remain 50% registration rights.

In summer 2014 he was signed by Real Vicenza. On 17 July 2015 he was signed by Pisa.

On 31 January 2019 he joined Virtus Verona. Virtus contract was dissolved by mutual consent on 19 April 2019, and he retired from playing.
