= Cristian Caccetta =

Italian football player (born 1986)

Personal information
- Date of birth: 7 August 1986 (age 40)
- Place of birth: Partinico, Italy
- Height: 1.86 m (6 ft 1 in)
- Position: Midfielder

Team information
- Current team: Licata

Senior career*
Years	Team	Apps	(Gls)
2007–2010	Nissa		
2010–2011	Foggia	13	(0)
2011–2014	Trapani	96	(6)
2014–2017	Cosenza	73	(9)
2017–2018	Catania	20	(1)
2018	→ Pordenone (loan)	8	(0)
2018–2019	Sambenedettese	21	(1)
2019–2020	Paganese	27	(0)
2020–2021	Lucchese	7	(0)
2021– 2022	Licata	11	(0)
- * Club domestic league appearances and goals as of 14 November 2021

Cristian Caccetta (born 7 August 1986) is an Italian football player who plays for Licata.

== Club career ==
He made his Serie C debut for Foggia on 29 August 2010 in a game against Lucchese. In October 2014, he was signed by Cosenza after being released by Trapani.

On 29 November 2018, he signed with Sambenedettese.

On 27 July 2019 he signed a one-year contract with Paganese.

On 31 August 2021, he joined Serie D club Licata.
