= Gianmario Comi =

Italian professional footballer

Personal information
- Date of birth: 5 March 1992 (age 34)
- Place of birth: Turin, Italy
- Height: 1.87 m (6 ft 1 1/2 in)
- Position: Forward

Team information
- Current team: Pro Vercelli
- Number: 26

Youth career
- 2007–2011: Torino
- 2011–2012: AC Milan

Senior career*
Years	Team	Apps	(Gls)
2012–2016	AC Milan	0	(0)
2012–2013	→ Reggina (loan)	35	(11)
2013–2014	→ Novara (loan)	13	(1)
2014	→ Lanciano (loan)	15	(2)
2014–2015	→ Avellino (loan)	33	(6)
2015–2017	→ Livorno (loan)	24	(2)
2016–2017	Carpi	4	(0)
2017	→ Pro Vercelli (loan)	14	(3)
2017–	Pro Vercelli	229	(70)
2017–2018	→ Vicenza (loan)	33	(9)
2024	→ Crotone (loan)	13	(1)

International career
2008	Italy U16	3	(0)
2009–2010	Italy U18	1	(0)
2013–2014	Italy U21	2	(0)
- * Club domestic league appearances and goals as of 30 April 2026

Gianmario Comi (born 5 March 1992) is an Italian professional footballer who plays as a forward for Serie C Group A club Pro Vercelli.

== Early life ==
Gianmario Comi was born in Turin, Italy. His father, Antonio, is a former professional footballer, who played as a midfielder for Torino and Roma, with 246 appearances in Serie A.

== Club career ==
In 2007, he was signed by Torino, with whom he played in the youth ranks until 2011, even appearing on the bench several times throughout the 2010–11 season.

In 2011, he was sold to AC Milan under a co-ownership agreement for €2.35 million and Milanese youngster, Simone Verdi, join Torino, also under co-ownership for €2.5 million. He played with the Milan Primavera (U19) throughout 2011 before going on loan to Reggina for the 2012–13 season. Comi was also the topscorer of the reserve league with 25 goals in the group stage in 2011–12 season.

He made his Coppa Italia debut for Reggina on 13 August 2012 against Nocerina and scored a goal in next Coppa match against Modena. In June 2013 the co-ownership deals were renewed. On 3 July 2013, he renewed his contract with Torino until 30 June 2017. On 31 August 2013, he scored his first goal for Novara Calcio, at the last second available in the match versus Siena, and Novara won 2‒1.

On 18 June 2014, the co-ownership between Milan and Torino was renewed for a third year. However, on 19 August Milan signed Comi outright, for an additional €150,000. On 15 July 2014, Comi was transferred to Avellino in a temporary deal.

On 31 January 2024, Comi joined Crotone on loan.

== International career ==
Comi made his debut in the U21 14 August 2013 in a friendly match against Slovakia. The following 5 March he played as a starter in the match won 2–0 against Northern Ireland, valid for the qualifications for the European Championships.

== Career statistics ==
=== Club ===
As of match played 29 December 2023

Appearances and goals by club, season and competition
Club	Season	League			National Cup		League Cup		Other		Total	
Club	Season	Division	Apps	Goals	Apps	Goals	Apps	Goals	Apps	Goals	Apps	Goals
Milan	2012–13	Serie A	0	0	0	0	—		—		0	0
Reggina (loan)	2012–13	Serie B	35	11	2	1	—		—		37	12
Novara (loan)	2013–14	Serie B	13	1	1	1	—		—		14	2
Lanciano (loan)	2013–14	Serie B	15	2	0	0	—		—		15	2
Avellino (loan)	2014–15	Serie B	33	6	3	1	—		3 (Note: Appearance(s) in Promotion Playoffs)	1	39	8
Livorno (loan)	2015–16	Serie B	24	2	2	1	—		—		26	3
Carpi	2016–17	Serie B	4	0	2	1	—		—		6	1
Pro Vercelli (loan)	2016–17	Serie B	14	3	0	0	—		—		14	3
Pro Vercelli	2018–19	Serie C	22	5	1	0	2	0	—		25	5
Pro Vercelli	2019–20	Serie C	24	6	0	0	—		—		24	6
Pro Vercelli	2020–21	Serie C	34	12	0	0	—		3	0	37	12
Pro Vercelli	2021–22	Serie C	34	10	0	0	1	0	2	0	37	10
Pro Vercelli	2022–23	Serie C	26	8	0	0	1	0	—		27	8
Pro Vercelli	2023–24	Serie C	19	2	0	0	1	0	—		20	2
Total			173	46	1	0	5	0	5	0	184	46
Vicenza (loan)	2017–18	Serie C	31	8	0	0	1	2	1 (Note: Appearance(s) in Relegation Playoffs)	0	33	10
Career total			328	76	11	5	6	2	9	1	354	84
