= Stadio Silvio Piola (Vercelli) =

Football stadium in Vercelli, Italy

Coordinates: 45°19′11″N 8°25′16″E

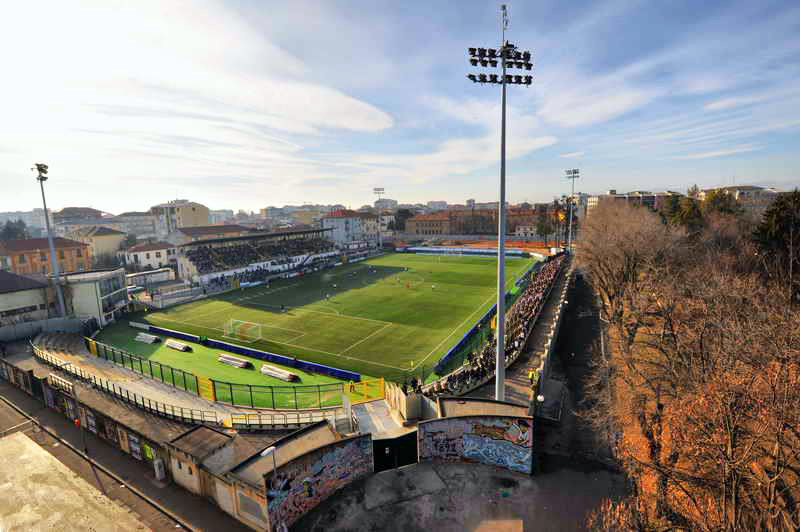
- Interactive map of Stadio Silvio Piola
- Location: Vercelli, Italy
- Owner: Municipality of Vercelli
- Capacity: 5,500
- Surface: synthetic grass Italgreen 62 Lesmo Geofill; 105x68m

Construction
- Groundbreaking: 1932
- Opened: 1932
- Renovated: 2011; 2012; 2015

Tenants
- F.C. Pro Vercelli 1892; A.C. Gozzano (temporarily)

Stadio Silvio Piola is an association football stadium in Vercelli, Italy. It is the home ground of F.C. Pro Vercelli 1892. The stadium holds 5,500 and was named after Italy legend and former player Silvio Piola.
