= FC Pro Vercelli 1892 =

Italian football club

Pro Vercelli
- Full name: Football Club Pro Vercelli 1892 S.r.l.
- Nicknames: Le Bianche Casacche (The White Shirts); I Leoni (The Lions)
- Founded: 1892; 134 years ago as Società Ginnastica Pro Vercelli
- Stadium: Stadio Silvio Piola
- Capacity: 5,500
- Owner: Bridge Football Group
- President: Ludovic Deléchat
- Head coach: Daniele Bonera
- League: Serie C Group A
- 2025–26: Serie C Group A, 14th of 20
- Website: fcprovercelli.it
Home colours	Away colours	Third colours

Football Club Pro Vercelli 1892, commonly referred to as Pro Vercelli, is an Italian football club based in Vercelli, Piedmont. The club is mostly renowned as one of the most successful teams in the early football era of Italy, with seven national titles (all won between 1908 and 1922). They currently play in Serie C, the third tier of Italian football.

== History ==
=== Early league successes and decline ===
The origins of football in Vercelli go back to 1892 when it was founded as Società Ginnastica Pro Vercelli (Pro Vercelli Gymnastics Society), and 1903 with its Football Division.

The first official match for the football division of S.G. Pro Vercelli took place on 3 August 1903 against the Forza e Costanza.

The club won seven Italian Football Championships from 1908 to 1922: 1908, 1909, 1910–11, 1911–12, 1912–13, 1920–21, and 1921–22.

The introduction of professionalism in Italian football, and the rise of teams from larger industrial and business cities such as Milan and Turin, led Pro Vercelli to a slow but continuous decline. They played Serie A for their last time to date in 1934–35, and went ultimately relegated also from the 1947–48 Serie B, starting a long period out of the two top divisions of Italian football, even being relegated to Italy's amateur league, Serie D, in multiple times. They regained professional status for good after winning promotion and the Scudetto Dilettanti in the season 1993–94.

=== Bankruptcy and the new Pro Vercelli ===
In the early 2000s, Pro Vercelli also had to challenge crosstown rivalry from a new team, A.S. Pro Belvedere Vercelli (with the colours yellow and green), founded in the summer of 2006 as a merger between A.S. Trino Calcio (based in Trino, Piedmont), who played in Serie D and minor league team P.G.S. Pro Belvedere, founded in 1912.

In the 2006–07 Serie D, the team finished 9th in Girone A. A year later, in the Serie D 2007–08 season, the team finished 3rd in the same division, qualifying for the Serie D play-offs. It won its way to the group stage of the tournament, but failed qualify as one of the top 5 teams of the play-offs, all of which were later promoted to Lega Pro Seconda Divisione.

In the 2008–09 Serie D, Pro Belvedere finished first in Girone B, winning direct promotion to Lega Pro Seconda Divisione. Their debut season into professional football also featured, for the first time in the club's history, a crosstown derby with Pro Vercelli, but was not particularly successful, with the team lying in second-last place for most of the time in the 2009–10 Lega Pro Seconda Divisione, and promotion winning coach Luca Prina being replaced by the more experienced Gianfranco Motta.

Pro Belvedere were relegated after only one season but re-admitted to fill a number of vacancies in the league; at the same time, due to large debts, Pro Vercelli was not allowed to participate in the 2010–11 Lega Pro Seconda Divisione and so folded. In order to keep the old Pro Vercelli alive, Pro Belvedere changed its name to U.S. Vercelli Calcio and weeks later acquired honours and trademarks from the old Pro Vercelli, being thus allowed to switch its denomination to the current one, as well as to maintain the historical names and colours of the original team.

In the season 2010–11 the team played in Lega Pro Seconda Divisione ranking 3rd and was eliminated from Pro Patria in the semifinal of the play-off, but on 4 August 2011 it was later admitted to Lega Pro Prima Divisione to fill vacancies.

=== New successes: back to Serie B after 64 years ===
In the season 2011–12 of Lega Pro Prima Divisione the club was promoted to Serie B after 64 years, beating Carpi 3–1 in the final return of the play-off after the 0–0 of the first round.

The club had a very unsuccessful return to Serie B, finishing 21st of 22 teams and with a goal difference −30, the worst in the league. Their placing in the league meant that they were relegated to Lega Pro Prima Divisione.

In 2013–14 season, Girone A of Lega Pro 1, Pro Vercelli missed out on an immediate automatic promotion back to Serie B by a single point, finishing second in the league to Virtus Entella and eight points above third placed Südtirol. Striker Ettore Marchi starred throughout the season, scoring 15 goals. In the promotion play-offs, Pro Vercelli eliminated FeralpiSalò, Savona and ultimately defeated Südtirol in the final, thus returning to Serie B after only one season away. Pro Vercelli finished 16th in Serie B in the 2014–15 season and 17th in the 2015–16 season. They were again relegated to Serie C after the 2017–18 season. On 11 July 2019, former Italian international striker Alberto Gilardino took the job as head coach.

On May 15, 2025 the club announces Bridge Football Group acquires 100% of the company's shares.

== Colours and badge ==
The historical colour of the shirts of Pro Vercelli is white.

== Honours ==
- Serie A:

Winners (7): 1908, 1909, 1910–11, 1911–12, 1912–13, 1920–21, 1921–22

- Seconda Categoria:

Winners (1): 1907

- Serie D:

Winners (4): 1956–57, 1970–71, 1983–84, 1993–94

- Scudetto Dilettanti:

Winners (1): 1993–94

=== International ===
- Tournoi de Pentecôte du Club Français:

Winners (1): 1927

== Players ==
=== Current squad ===
As of 1 September 2026

Note: Flags indicate national team as defined under FIFA eligibility rules; some limited exceptions apply. Players may hold more than one non-FIFA nationality.

No.	Pos.	Nation	Player
1	GK	ITA	Pietro Passador
3	DF	ITA	Luca Coccolo
4	DF	NED	Luc van Koeverden
5	MF	MAR	Adam Boufandar
6	MF	NED	Zaid El Bakkali
7	FW	NED	Mohamed Mallahi
8	MF	ITA	Angelo Burruano
9	FW	ITA	Marco Bertoli
10	MF	ITA	Mattia Rutigliano
11	FW	SEN	Ousseynou Sow
14	MF	ITA	Ilario Iotti
16	DF	ITA	Niccolò Ronchi
17	MF	ITA	Aaron Ciammaglichella (on loan from Torino)
18	MF	ITA	Leonardo Piran

No.	Pos.	Nation	Player
21	FW	ITA	Mattia Iori
23	MF	ITA	Clemente Perotti
24	GK	ITA	Riccardo Andreotti
25	DF	ITA	Marco Pagliari
26	FW	ITA	Gianmario Comi
28	DF	ITA	Alessandro Carosso
30	DF	ITA	Andrea Moretti
32	MF	ITA	Giovanni Zacchera
44	DF	ITA	Cristiano Furno
45	FW	ITA	Antonio Satriano
50	GK	ITA	Nicolò Vaccarezza
77	GK	ITA	Mattia Del Favero
97	GK	ITA	Alessandro Livieri

=== Out on loan ===
Note: Flags indicate national team as defined under FIFA eligibility rules; some limited exceptions apply. Players may hold more than one non-FIFA nationality.

No. / Pos. / Nation / Player; — / DF / ITA / Lorenzo Tarantola (at Chisola until 30 June 2027)	No. / Pos. / Nation / Player; — / FW / FRA / Jean-Guy Akpa Akpro (at Grenoble until 30 June 2027)

== Managers ==
- (Italy) Guido Ara (1919–26)
- (Hungary) József Nagy (1928–32)
- (Italy) Guido Ara (1932–34)
- (Italy) Pietro Leone (1935)
- (Italy) Antonio Montico (1976–77)
- (Italy) Giuliano Zoratti (1986–90)
- (Italy) Bruno Baveni (1995–96)
- (Italy) Agatino Cuttone (1999–2000)
- (Italy) Renzo Gobbo (2002–03)
- (Italy) Nello Santin (2003–04)
- (Italy) Roberto Galia (2007)
- (Italy) Gianluca Gaudenzi (2007–08)
- (Italy) Giancarlo Camolese (2012–13)
- (Italy) Cristiano Scazzola (2013–15)
- (Italy) Claudio Foscarini (2015–16)
- (Italy) Moreno Longo (2016–17)
- (Italy) Gianluca Grassadonia (2017–18)
- (Italy) Gianluca Atzori (2018)
- (Italy) Gianluca Grassadonia (2018)
- (Italy) Vito Grieco (2018–2019)
- (Italy) Alberto Gilardino (2019–2020)
- (Italy) Francesco Modesto (2020–2021)
- (Italy) Giuseppe Scienza (2021)
- (Italy) Franco Lerda (2021–2022)
- (Italy) Massimo Paci (2022–2023)
- (Italy) Massimo Gardano (2023)
- (Italy) Andrea Dossena (2023–2024)
- (Italy) Paolo Cannavaro (2024–)

== Bibliography ==
- Chiesa, Carlo. La grande storia del calcio italiano, pubblicato a puntate sul Guerin Sportivo.
- Rolandi, Luca (2013). Quando vinceva il quadrilatero 1908–1928. Gli anni d'oro del calcio piemontese. Ivrea-Torino: Bradipolibri.
- Tacchini, Alex (1998–2007). Il grande album della Pro Vercelli. GS Editrice.

== See also ==
- Dynasties in Italian football
