= 2019–20 US Lecce season =

Lecce
2019–20 season
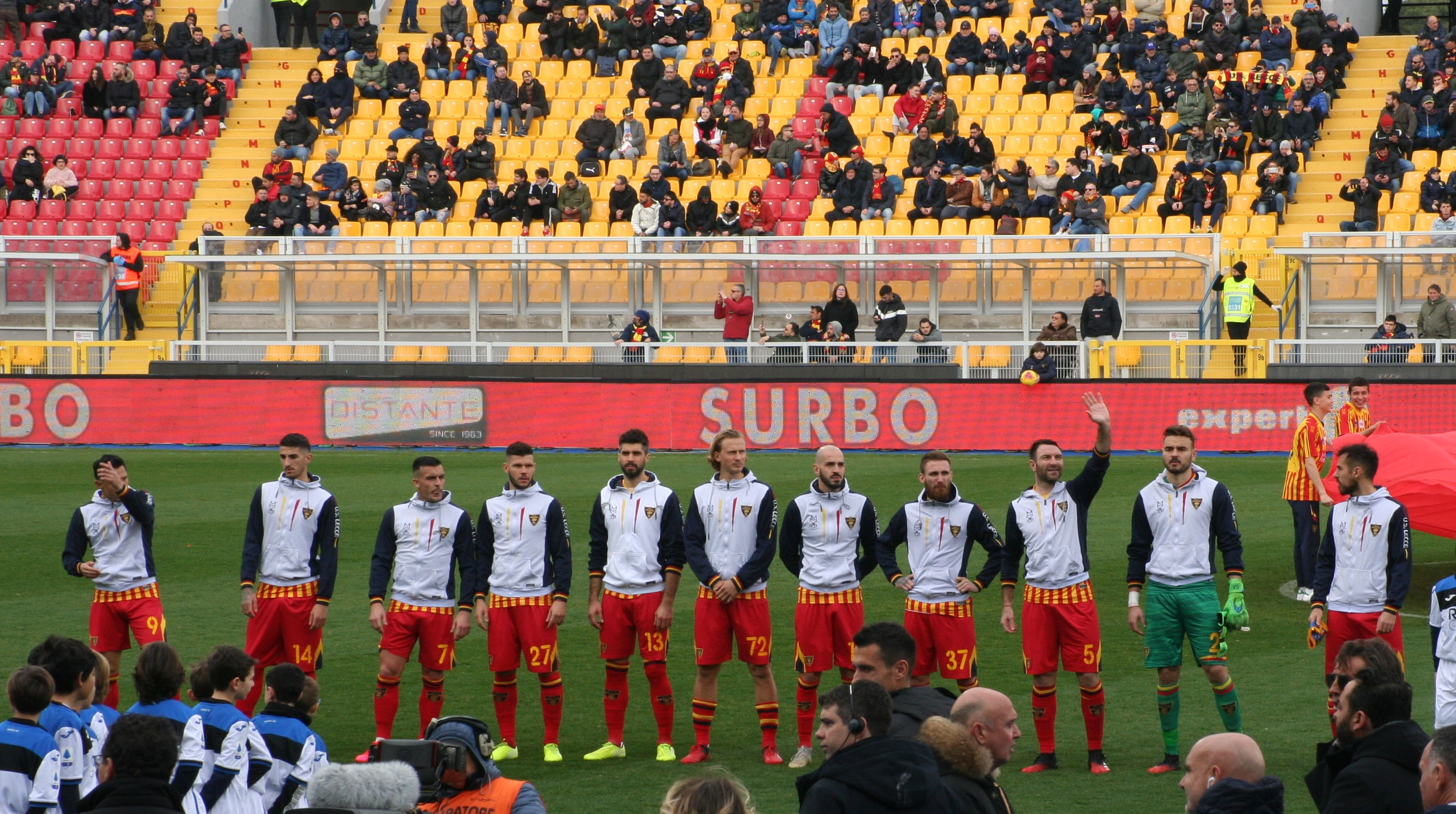
- President: Saverio Sticchi Damiani
- Manager: Fabio Liverani
- Stadium: Stadio Via del Mare
- Serie A: 18th (relegated)
- Coppa Italia: Fourth round
- Top goalscorer: League: Marco Mancosu (14); All: Marco Mancosu (14)
Home colours	Away colours	Third colours

The 2019–20 season was Unione Sportiva Lecce's first season back in Serie A since being relegated at the end of the 2010–11 Serie A season. The club competed in Serie A and in the Coppa Italia, starting in the third round.

The season was coach Fabio Liverani's third in charge and second full season after being appointed in September 2017.

== Players ==
=== Squad information ===
Last updated on 9 February 2020
Appearances include league matches only

No.	Name	Nat	Position(s)	Date of birth (age)	Signed from	Signed in	Contract ends	Apps.	Goals	Notes
Goalkeepers
21	Gabriel	(Brazil)	GK	27 September 1992 (age 33)	(Italy) Perugia	2019	2021	21	0	
22	Mauro Vigorito	(Italy)	GK	22 May 1990 (age 36)	(Italy) Frosinone	2018	2021	36	0	
97	Gianmarco Chironi	(Italy)	GK	7 September 1997 (age 28)	(Italy) Youth Sector	2014	2020	1	0	
Defenders
3	Brayan Vera	(Colombia)	LB / LM / CB	15 January 1999 (age 27)	(Colombia) Leones	2019	2023	3	0	
5	Fabio Lucioni	(Italy)	CB	25 September 1987 (age 38)	(Italy) Benevento	2018	2021	47	3	
6	Nehuén Paz	(Argentina)	CB / LB	28 April 1993 (age 33)	(Italy) Bologna	2020	2020	2	0	Loan
7	Giulio Donati	(Italy)	RB / LB / RM	5 February 1990 (age 36)	Unattached	2019	2020	6	0	
13	Luca Rossettini	(Italy)	CB / RB	9 May 1985 (age 41)	(Italy) Genoa	2019	2021	22	0	
16	Biagio Meccariello	(Italy)	CB	27 March 1991 (age 35)	(Italy) Brescia	2019	2021	41	0	
18	Roberto Pierno	(Italy)	RB	14 February 2001 (age 25)	(Italy) Youth Sector	2019		0	0	
27	Marco Calderoni	(Italy)	LB / LM / RB	18 February 1989 (age 37)	(Italy) Novara	2018	2020	46	3	
29	Andrea Rispoli	(Italy)	RB / RM / LB	29 September 1988 (age 37)	(Italy) Palermo	2019	2021	20	0	
39	Cristian Dell'Orco	(Italy)	LB / CB	10 February 1994 (age 32)	(Italy) Sassuolo	2019	2020	8	0	Loan
Midfielders
4	Jacopo Petriccione	(Italy)	CM / DM	22 February 1995 (age 31)	(Italy) Bari	2018	2023	52	2	
8	Marco Mancosu	(Italy)	AM / CM / LW	22 August 1988 (age 37)	(Italy) Casertana	2016	2021	115	33	Captain
11	Yevhen Shakhov	(Ukraine)	CM / AM / DM	30 November 1990 (age 35)	(Greece) PAOK	2019	2021	13	0	
14	Alessandro Deiola	(Italy)	CM / DM	1 August 1995 (age 30)	(Italy) Cagliari	2020	2020	5	1	Loan
18	Riccardo Saponara	(Italy)	AM	21 December 1991 (age 34)	(Italy) Genoa	2020	2020	2	0	Loan
37	Žan Majer	(Slovenia)	CM / AM / DM	25 July 1992 (age 33)	(Russia) Rostov	2019	2022	28	0	
72	Antonín Barák	(Czech Republic)	CM / AM / DM	3 December 1994 (age 31)	(Italy) Udinese	2020	2020	2	0	Loan
77	Panagiotis Tachtsidis	(Greece)	DM / CM	15 February 1991 (age 35)	(England) Nottingham Forest	2019	2022	34	0	
85	Giannelli Imbula	(France)	DM / CM	12 November 1992 (age 33)	(England) Stoke City	2019	2020	3	0	Loan
Forwards
9	Gianluca Lapadula	(Italy)	CF / SS	7 February 1990 (age 36)	(Italy) Genoa	2019	2020	16	7	Loan
10	Filippo Falco	(Italy)	SS / AM / RW	11 February 1992 (age 34)	(Italy) Bologna	2018	2022	76	12	
17	Diego Farias	(Brazil)	SS / RW / LW	10 May 1990 (age 36)	(Italy) Cagliari	2019	2021	12	2	Loan
30	Khouma Babacar	(Senegal)	CF	17 March 1993 (age 33)	(Italy) Sassuolo	2019	2020	17	2	Loan
Players transferred during the season
2	Davide Riccardi	(Italy)	CB / LB	9 April 1996 (age 30)	(Italy) Hellas Verona	2018	2022	3	0	
6	Romario Benzar	(Romania)	RB / RM / CM	26 March 1992 (age 34)	(Romania) FCSB	2019	2022	3	0	
14	Luka Dumančić	(Croatia)	CB / LB	27 October 1998 (age 27)	(Italy) Albalonga	2018	2020	0	0	
19	Andrea La Mantia	(Italy)	CF	6 May 1991 (age 35)	(Italy) Virtus Entella	2018	2022	44	19	
20	Edgaras Dubickas	(Lithuania)	SS / CF / LW	9 July 1998 (age 27)	(Lithuania) Švyturys Marijampolė	2018	2021	3	0	
23	Andrea Tabanelli	(Italy)	CM / AM	2 February 1990 (age 36)	(Italy) Padova	2018	2020	50	9	
25	Antonino Gallo	(Italy)	LB / LM	5 January 2000 (age 26)	(Italy) Palermo	2019	2023	0	0	
28	Riccardo Fiamozzi	(Italy)	RB / RM / LB	18 May 1993 (age 33)	(Italy) Genoa	2018	2021	11	1	
32	Simone Lo Faso	(Italy)	SS / AM / LW	18 February 1998 (age 28)	(Italy) Palermo	2019	2023	0	0	
95	Marco Bleve	(Italy)	GK	18 October 1995 (age 30)	(Italy) Youth Sector	2013	2020	26	0	

== Pre-season and friendlies ==
25 July 2019 Friendly	Lecce (Italy)	6–0	(Italy) Virtus Bolzano	Santa Cristina, Italy
16:00 CEST (UTC+2)	Felici 5', 63'; Lapadula 13'; La Mantia 38'; Falco 49'; Vera 88'	Report		Stadium: C.S. Mulin Da Coi

27 July 2019 Friendly	Lecce (Italy)	4–1	(Italy) Frosinone	Trento, Italy
16:30 CEST (UTC+2)	Meccariello 46'; Falco 75'; Lapadula 82'; Dubickas 90'	Report	Paganini 26'	Stadium: Stadio Briamasco; Referee: Nicola Donda

7 September 2019 Friendly	Lecce (Italy)	2–1	(Italy) Cosenza	Lecce, Italy
18:00 CEST (UTC+2)	Babacar 46'; Mancosu 90+2'	Report	Trovato 53'	Stadium: Stadio Via del Mare; Attendance: 3,027; Referee: Giovanni Ayroldi

== Competitions ==
=== Serie A ===
==== League table ====
Pos	Team	Pld	W	D	L	GF	GA	GD	Pts	Qualification or relegation
16	Torino	38	11	7	20	46	68	−22	40	
17	Genoa	38	10	9	19	47	73	−26	39	
18	Lecce (R)	38	9	8	21	52	85	−33	35	Relegation to Serie B
19	Brescia (R)	38	6	7	25	35	79	−44	25	Relegation to Serie B
20	SPAL (R)	38	5	5	28	27	77	−50	20	Relegation to Serie B

Source: Serie A, Soccerway
Rules for classification: 1) Points; 2) Head-to-head points; 3) Head-to-head goal difference; 4) Goal difference; 5) Goals scored; 6) Draw. (Note: Head-to-head record is used only after all the matches between the teams in question have been played)
(R) Relegated

==== Results summary ====
Overall								Home						Away					
Pld	W	D	L	GF	GA	GD	Pts	W	D	L	GF	GA	GD	W	D	L	GF	GA	GD
38	9	8	21	52	83	−31	35	4	5	10	30	39	−9	5	3	11	22	44	−22

Last updated: 2 August 2020.
Source: Competitive matches

==== Results by round ====
Round	1	2	3	4	5	6	7	8	9	10	11	12	13	14	15	16	17	18	19	20	21	22	23	24	25	26	27	28	29	30	31	32	33	34	35	36	37	38
Ground	A	H	A	H	A	H	A	A	H	A	H	A	H	A	H	A	H	H	A	H	A	H	A	H	A	H	H	A	H	A	H	A	H	A	H	A	A	H
Result	L	L	W	L	W	L	L	D	D	D	D	L	D	W	D	L	L	L	L	D	L	W	W	W	L	L	L	L	L	L	W	D	L	L	W	L	W	L
Position	20	19	18	18	14	17	18	16	16	16	16	16	16	15	15	15	17	17	17	17	17	17	17	16	16	18	18	18	18	18	18	18	18	18	18	18	18	18

Updated to match(es) played on 2 August 2020. Source: Competitive matches
A = Away; H = Home; W = Win; D = Draw; L = Loss

==== Matches ====
26 August 2019 1	Internazionale	4–0	Lecce	Milan
20:45 CEST (UTC+02:00)	Brozović 21'; Sensi 24'; Martínez (yellow card) 40'; Lukaku 60'; Candreva 84'	Report	Petriccione (yellow card) 38'; Lapadula (yellow card) 52'; Farias (red card) 76'	Stadium: San Siro; Attendance: 64,188; Referee: Federico La Penna

1 September 2019 2	Lecce	0–1	Hellas Verona	Lecce
20:45 CEST (UTC+02:00)	Rossettini (yellow card) 22'; Majer (yellow card) 85'	Report	Kumbulla (yellow card) 3'; Günter (yellow card) 65'; Verre (yellow card) 67'; Pessina 81'	Stadium: Stadio Via del Mare; Attendance: 24,418; Referee: Juan Luca Sacchi

16 September 2019 3	Torino	1–2	Lecce	Turin
20:45 CEST (UTC+02:00)	Berenguer (yellow card) 40'; Belotti 58' (pen.)	Report	Rossettini (yellow card) 15'; Lucioni (yellow card) 18'; Farias 35', (yellow card) 45'; Lapadula (yellow card) 50'; Tabanelli (yellow card) 56'; Mancosu 73'; Rispoli (yellow card) 88'	Stadium: Stadio Olimpico Grande Torino; Attendance: 21,620; Referee: Antonio Giua

22 September 2019 4	Lecce	1–4	Napoli	Lecce
15:00 CEST (UTC+02:00)	Tachtsidis (yellow card) 37'; Gabriel (yellow card) 38'; Tabanelli (yellow card) 49'; Mancosu 61' (pen.)	Report	Ghoulam (yellow card) 22'; Llorente 28', 82'; Insigne 40' (pen.); Elmas (yellow card) 45+1'; Fabián 52', (yellow card) 53'	Stadium: Stadio Via del Mare; Attendance: 21,644; Referee: Marco Piccinini

25 September 2019 5	SPAL	1–3	Lecce	Ferrara
21:00 CEST (UTC+02:00)	Di Francesco 17'; Igor (yellow card) 70'	Report	Babacar (yellow card) 6'; Mancosu 11' (pen.), 73' (pen.); Calderoni (yellow card) 34', (goal) 47'	Stadium: Stadio Paolo Mazza; Attendance: 13,292; Referee: Gianluca Rocchi

29 September 2019 6	Lecce	0–1	Roma	Lecce
15:00 CEST (UTC+02:00)	Lucioni (yellow card) 79'; Rispoli (yellow card) 84'	Report	Pellegrini (yellow card) 19'; Mkhitaryan (yellow card) 25'; Smalling (yellow card) 49'; Džeko 56'; Cristante (yellow card) 90+6'	Stadium: Stadio Via del Mare; Attendance: 26,044; Referee: Rosario Abisso

6 October 2019 7	Atalanta	3–1	Lecce	Bergamo
15:00 CEST (UTC+02:00)	Zapata 35'; Gómez 40'; Gosens 56'; Kjær (yellow card) 63'; De Roon (yellow card) 73'	Report	Lucioni (yellow card) 62', (goal) 86'; Majer (yellow card) 84'; Rispoli (yellow card) 89'	Stadium: Gewiss Stadium; Attendance: 20,771; Referee: Marco Di Bello

20 October 2019 8	Milan	2–2	Lecce	Milan
20:45 CEST (UTC+02:00)	Çalhanoğlu 20'; Piątek 81'; Biglia (yellow card) 85'	Report	Majer (yellow card) 44'; Babacar 62'; Rossettini (yellow card) 76'; Calderoni 90+2'	Stadium: San Siro; Attendance: 48,703; Referee: Fabrizio Pasqua

26 October 2019 9	Lecce	1–1	Juventus	Lecce
15:00 CEST (UTC+02:00)	Calderoni (yellow card) 13'; Rossettini (yellow card) 18'; Mancosu 56' (pen.), (yellow card) 73'; Lapadula (yellow card) 88'	Report	Dybala 50' (pen.); Bernardeschi (yellow card) 79'	Stadium: Stadio Via del Mare; Attendance: 26,591; Referee: Paolo Valeri

30 October 2019 10	Sampdoria	1–1	Lecce	Genoa
21:00 CET (UTC+01:00)	Ekdal (yellow card) 28'; Ferrari (yellow card) 56'; Vieira (yellow card) 75'; Depaoli (yellow card) 76'; Ramírez 90+2'	Report	Lapadula 8'; Petriccione (yellow card) 43'; Tachtsidis (yellow card) 45+4' (yellow-red card) 72'; Meccariello (yellow card) 54'	Stadium: Stadio Luigi Ferraris; Attendance: 18,685; Referee: Davide Massa

3 November 2019 11	Lecce	2–2	Sassuolo	Lecce
15:00 CET (UTC+01:00)	Lapadula 18'; Falco 42'; Calderoni (yellow card) 60'; Shakhov (yellow card) 74'	Report	Toljan 35', (yellow card) 45+1'; Locatelli (yellow card) 37'; Obiang (yellow card) 82'; Berardi 85'	Stadium: Stadio Via del Mare; Attendance: 22,087; Referee: Riccardo Ros

10 November 2019 12	Lazio	4–2	Lecce	Rome
15:00 CET (UTC+01:00)	Correa 30', 80'; Lucas (yellow card) 34'; Milinković-Savić 62'; Immobile (yellow card) 69', (goal) 78' (pen.)	Report	Mancosu (yellow card) 4'; Lapadula 40', (yellow card) 59'; Lucioni (yellow card) 69'; La Mantia 85'	Stadium: Stadio Olimpico; Attendance: 35,000; Referee: Gianluca Manganiello

25 November 2019 13	Lecce	2–2	Cagliari	Lecce
15:00 CET (UTC+01:00)	Petriccione (yellow card) 69'; Lapadula 83' (pen.), (red card) 85'; Calderoni 90+1'; Farias (yellow card) 90+5'	Report	Lykogiannis (yellow card) 21'; João Pedro 30' (pen.); Rog (yellow card) 45+5'; Nainggolan 67'; Cacciatore (red card) 81'; Olsen (red card) 85'	Stadium: Stadio Via del Mare; Attendance: 21,435; Referee: Maurizio Mariani

30 November 2019 14	Fiorentina	0–1	Lecce	Florence
20:45 CET (UTC+01:00)	Castrovilli (yellow card) 67'	Report	Rispoli (yellow card) 29'; La Mantia 49'; Petriccione (yellow card) 60'; Rossettini (yellow card) 69'	Stadium: Stadio Artemio Franchi; Attendance: 33,912; Referee: Marco Piccinini

8 December 2019 15	Lecce	2–2	Genoa	Lecce
12:30 CET (UTC+01:00)	La Mantia (yellow card) 21'; Lucioni (yellow card) 45+4'; Tachtsidis (yellow card) 55'; Falco 60'; Petriccione (yellow card) 65'; Tabanelli 70', (yellow card) 71'	Report	Pajač (yellow card) 14'; Agudelo (yellow card) 18' (yellow-red card) 69'; Pandev 31', (yellow card) 73' (yellow-red card) 77'; Criscito 45+5' (pen.), (yellow card) 67'	Stadium: Stadio Via del Mare; Attendance: 21,740; Referee: Gianluca Rocchi

14 December 2019 16	Brescia	3–0	Lecce	Brescia
15:00 CET (UTC+01:00)	Chancellor 32', (yellow card) 35'; Balotelli (yellow card) 38'; Torregrossa (yellow card) 40', (goal) 44'; Špalek (yellow card) 58', (goal) 61'	Report	Majer (yellow card) 11'; Shakhov (yellow card) 15'; Lapadula (yellow card) 45'; Tabanelli (yellow card) 45+2'; Calderoni (yellow card) 58'; Farias (yellow card) 76'	Stadium: Stadio Mario Rigamonti; Attendance: 13,131; Referee: Massimiliano Irrati

22 December 2019 17	Lecce	2–3	Bologna	Lecce
15:00 CET (UTC+01:00)	Tachtsidis (yellow card) 41'; Babacar (yellow card) 53', (goal) 85'; Calderoni (yellow card) 89'; Farias 90+1'	Report	Medel (yellow card) 41'; Orsolini 43', 66'; Mbaye (yellow card) 44'; Soriano 56'; Schouten (yellow card) 82'	Stadium: Stadio Via del Mare; Attendance: 18,763; Referee: Rosario Abisso

6 January 2020 18	Lecce	0–1	Udinese	Lecce
18:00 CET (UTC+01:00)	Gabriel (yellow card) 89'	Report	De Paul 88', (yellow card) 89'	Stadium: Stadio Via del Mare; Attendance: 21,321; Referee: Antonio Giua

13 January 2020 19	Parma	2–0	Lecce	Parma
20:45 CET (UTC+01:00)	Hernani (yellow card) 33'; Iacoponi 57'; Inglese (yellow card) 63'; Cornelius 72'; Alves (yellow card) 80'; Darmian (yellow card) 82'	Report	Petriccione (yellow card) 41'	Stadium: Stadio Ennio Tardini; Attendance: 15,258; Referee: Michael Fabbri

19 January 2020 20	Lecce	1–1	Internazionale	Lecce
15:00 CET (UTC+01:00)	Donati (yellow card) 21'; Mancosu 77'; Meccariello (yellow card) 90+3'	Report	Candreva (yellow card) 32'; Bastoni 72'; Valero (yellow card) 88'	Stadium: Stadio Via del Mare; Attendance: 25,966; Referee: Piero Giacomelli

26 January 2020 21	Hellas Verona	3–0	Lecce	Verona
15:00 CET (UTC+01:00)	Dawidowicz 19'; Faraoni (yellow card) 30'; Pessina 34'; Amrabat (yellow card) 65'; Pazzini 87' (pen.)	Report	Tachtsidis (yellow card) 15'; Dell'Orco (yellow card) 58' (yellow-red card) 68'	Stadium: Stadio Marc'Antonio Bentegodi; Attendance: 15,425; Referee: Rosario Abisso

2 February 2020 22	Lecce	4–0	Torino	Lecce
18:00 CET (UTC+01:00)	Deiola 11', (yellow card) 43'; Barák 19'; Majer (yellow card) 33'; Falco 64'; Lapadula (yellow card) 76', (goal) 78' (pen.)	Report	Nkoulou (yellow card) 12'; Meïté (yellow card) 18'; Aina (yellow card) 60'	Stadium: Stadio Via del Mare; Attendance: 21,947; Referee: Gianluca Rocchi

9 February 2020 23	Napoli	2–3	Lecce	Naples
15:00 CET (UTC+01:00)	Koulibaly (yellow card) 37'; Milik 48', (yellow card) 73'; Zieliński (yellow card) 57'; Mário Rui (yellow card) 80'; Demme (yellow card) 84'; Callejón 90'	Report	Lapadula 29', 61'; Rispoli (yellow card) 66'; Vigorito (yellow card) 78'; Mancosu 82'; Petriccione (yellow card) 85'	Stadium: Stadio San Paolo; Attendance: 40,825; Referee: Antonio Giua

15 February 2020 24	Lecce	2–1	SPAL	Lecce
15:00 CET (UTC+01:00)	Majer (yellow card) 16', (goal) 66'; Mancosu 41' (pen.); Deiola (yellow card) 43'; Calderoni (yellow card) 45'; Lapadula (yellow card) 60'; Shakhov (yellow card) 90+4'	Report	Di Francesco (yellow card) 20'; Bonifazi (yellow card) 40'; Petagna 47'; Valdifiori (yellow card) 61'	Stadium: Stadio Via del Mare; Attendance: 24,129; Referee: Marco Guida

23 February 2020 25	Roma	4–0	Lecce	Rome
18:00 CET (UTC+01:00)	Ünder 13'; Mkhitaryan 37'; Mancini (yellow card) 49'; Džeko 69'; Kolarov 80'	Report		Stadium: Stadio Olimpico; Attendance: 34,293; Referee: Piero Giacomelli

1 March 2020 26	Lecce	2–7	Atalanta	Lecce
15:00 CET (UTC+01:00)	Saponara 29', (yellow card) 70'; Donati 40'; Lucioni (yellow card) 66'	Report	Donati 17' (o.g.); Zapata 22', 54', 62'; Hateboer (yellow card) 45+1'; Iličić 47'; Palomino (yellow card) 57'; Muriel 87'; Malinovskyi 90+2'	Stadium: Stadio Via del Mare; Attendance: 21,344; Referee: Davide Massa

22 June 2020 27	Lecce	1–4	Milan	Lecce
19:30 CEST (UTC+02:00)	Lucioni (yellow card) 49'; Mancosu 54' (pen.)	Report	Castillejo 26'; Bonaventura 55'; Rebić 57'; Gabbia (yellow card) 64'; Leão 72'	Stadium: Stadio Via del Mare; Attendance: 0 Referee: Paolo Valeri
Note: Match was postponed to 15 March, then to 22 June, from its original date of 9 March due to schedule shuffling to allow for previous postponements to be played due to concerns over the COVID-19 pandemic. All subsequent matches were also shuffled to allow for this accommodation. On 9 March, all sports events in Italy were suspended until 3 April. This was the first match played since the COVID-19 pandemic lockdown in Italy.

26 June 2020 28	Juventus	4–0	Lecce	Turin
21:45 CEST (UTC+02:00)	Bentancur (yellow card) 38'; Dybala 53'; Ronaldo 62' (pen.); Higuaín 83'; De Ligt 85'	Report	Lucioni (red card) 32'	Stadium: Allianz Stadium; Attendance: 0 Referee: Marco Piccinini

1 July 2020 29	Lecce	1–2	Sampdoria	Lecce
21:45 CEST (UTC+02:00)	Paz (yellow card) 37'; Mancosu 50' (pen.), (yellow card) 67'	Report	Ramírez 40' (pen.), 75' (pen.); Augello (yellow card) 58'; Thorsby (yellow card) 77'; Bereszyński (yellow card) 90+1'	Stadium: Stadio Via del Mare; Attendance: 0 Referee: Gianluca Rocchi

4 July 2020 30	Sassuolo	4–2	Lecce	Reggio Emilia
19:30 CEST (UTC+02:00)	Caputo 5', (yellow card) 32'; Đuričić (yellow card) 49'; Marlon (yellow card) 54'; Berardi 63' (pen.); Boga 78'; Müldür 83'	Report	Babacar (yellow card) 22'; Lucioni 27'; Petriccione (yellow card) 34'; Paz (yellow card) 62'; Mancosu 67' (pen.); Tachtsidis (yellow card) 90'	Stadium: Mapei Stadium – Città del Tricolore; Attendance: 0 Referee: Davide Massa

7 July 2020 31	Lecce	2–1	Lazio	Lecce
19:30 CEST (UTC+02:00)	Babacar 30'; Donati (yellow card) 43'; Lucioni 47'; Gabriel (yellow card) 56'; Petriccione (yellow card) 65'	Report	Caicedo 5', (yellow card) 22'; Radu (yellow card) 43'; Immobile (yellow card) 81'; Patric (red card) 90+3'	Stadium: Stadio Via del Mare; Attendance: 0 Referee: Fabio Maresca

12 July 2020 32	Cagliari	0–0	Lecce	Cagliari
19:30 CEST (UTC+02:00)	Birsa (yellow card) 90'	Report	Deiola (yellow card) 75'	Stadium: Sardegna Arena; Attendance: 0 Referee: Daniele Orsato

15 July 2020 33	Lecce	1–3	Fiorentina	Lecce
21:45 CEST (UTC+02:00)	Gabriel (yellow card) 10'; Babacar (yellow card) 21'; Donati (yellow card) 36'; Shakhov 88'	Report	Chiesa 6'; Ribéry (yellow card) 10'; Ghezzal (yellow card) 27', (goal) 38'; Cutrone 40'	Stadium: Stadio Via del Mare; Attendance: 0 Referee: Marco Guida

19 July 2020 34	Genoa	2–1	Lecce	Genoa
19:30 CEST (UTC+02:00)	Sanabria 7'; Lerager (yellow card) 15'; Romero (yellow card) 64'; Gabriel 81' (o.g.)	Report	Petriccione (yellow card) 35'; Saponara (yellow card) 44'; Lucioni (yellow card) 52'; Mancosu 60'	Stadium: Stadio Luigi Ferraris; Attendance: 0 Referee: Daniele Doveri

22 July 2020 35	Lecce	3–1	Brescia	Lecce
21:45 CEST (UTC+02:00)	Paz (yellow card) 17'; Lapadula 22', 32'; Saponara 70'; Majer (yellow card) 79'	Report	Sabelli (yellow card) 21'; Dessena 63'	Stadium: Stadio Via del Mare; Attendance: 0 Referee: Fabio Maresca

26 July 2020 36	Bologna	3–2	Lecce	Bologna
17:15 CEST (UTC+02:00)	Palacio 2', (yellow card) 43'; Soriano 5'; Barrow 90+3'	Report	Mancosu 45+2'; Falco 66'; Rispoli (yellow card) 90+7'	Stadium: Stadio Renato Dall'Ara; Attendance: 0 Referee: Gianpaolo Calvarese

29 July 2020 37	Udinese	1–2	Lecce	Udine
19:30 CEST (UTC+02:00)	Samir 36'; Sema (yellow card) 86'	Report	Paz (yellow card) 22'; Mancosu 40' (pen.); Calderoni (yellow card) 45+1'; Lapadula 81', (yellow card) 82'; Donati (yellow card) 90+3'	Stadium: Dacia Arena; Attendance: 0 Referee: Daniele Orsato

2 August 2020 38	Lecce	3–4	Parma	Lecce
20:45 CEST (UTC+02:00)	Barák 40'; Meccariello 45'; Lapadula 69'	Report	Lucioni 11' (o.g.); Caprari 24'; Kurtić (yellow card) 34'; Alves (yellow card) 45'; Cornelius 52'; Inglese 67'	Stadium: Stadio Via del Mare; Attendance: 0 Referee: Maurizio Mariani

=== Coppa Italia ===
18 August 2019 Third round	Lecce	4–0	Salernitana	Lecce
20:45 CEST (UTC+02:00)	Lapadula 4', 76'; Majer (yellow card) 33', (goal) 81'; La Mantia (yellow card) 59'; Falco 61'	Report	Kiyine (yellow card) 45'	Stadium: Stadio Via del Mare; Attendance: 15,956; Referee: Eugenio Abbattista

4 December 2019 Fourth round	SPAL	5–1	Lecce	Ferrara
18:00 CET (UTC+01:00)	Missiroli (yellow card) 8'; Igor 18'; Paloschi 24'; Murgia (yellow card) 28', (goal) 31'; Cionek 45'; Floccari 83'	Report	Imbula (yellow card) 49', (goal) 55'	Stadium: Stadio Paolo Mazza; Attendance: 4,947; Referee: Antonio Giua

== Statistics ==
=== Appearances and goals ===
No.	Pos	Nat	Player	Total		Serie A		Coppa Italia	
No.	Pos	Nat	Player	Apps	Goals	Apps	Goals	Apps	Goals
Goalkeepers
21	GK	(Brazil) BRA	Gabriel	35	0	34	0	1	0
22	GK	(Italy) ITA	Mauro Vigorito	6	0	4+1	0	1	0
97	GK	(Italy) ITA	Gianmarco Chironi	0	0	0	0	0	0
Defenders
3	DF	(Colombia) COL	Brayan Vera	9	0	1+7	0	1	0
5	DF	(Italy) ITA	Fabio Lucioni	37	3	36	3	1	0
6	DF	(Argentina) ARG	Nehuén Paz	13	0	10+3	0	0	0
7	DF	(Italy) ITA	Giulio Donati	20	1	20	1	0	0
13	DF	(Italy) ITA	Luca Rossettini	27	0	25+1	0	1	0
15	DF	(Italy) ITA	Ilario Monterisi	1	0	0+1	0	0	0
16	DF	(Italy) ITA	Biagio Meccariello	14	1	8+6	1	0	0
18	DF	(Italy) ITA	Roberto Pierno	0	0	0	0	0	0
27	DF	(Italy) ITA	Marco Calderoni	27	3	24+2	3	1	0
29	DF	(Italy) ITA	Andrea Rispoli	29	0	20+8	0	1	0
39	DF	(Italy) ITA	Cristian Dell'Orco	16	0	11+3	0	1+1	0
Midfielders
4	MF	(Italy) ITA	Jacopo Petriccione	33	0	24+7	0	2	0
8	MF	(Italy) ITA	Marco Mancosu	33	14	28+5	14	0	0
11	MF	(Ukraine) UKR	Yevhen Shakhov	24	1	9+15	1	0	0
14	MF	(Italy) ITA	Alessandro Deiola	10	1	8+2	1	0	0
18	MF	(Italy) ITA	Riccardo Saponara	13	2	11+2	2	0	0
34	MF	(Italy) ITA	Sergio Maselli	1	0	0	0	0+1	0
37	MF	(Slovenia) SVN	Žan Majer	29	2	19+8	1	1+1	1
72	MF	(Czech Republic) CZE	Antonín Barák	16	2	15+1	2	0	0
77	MF	(Greece) GRE	Panagiotis Tachtsidis	29	0	24+4	0	1	0
Forwards
9	FW	(Italy) ITA	Gianluca Lapadula	27	13	20+5	11	2	2
10	FW	(Italy) ITA	Filippo Falco	31	5	24+6	4	1	1
17	FW	(Brazil) BRA	Diego Farias	19	2	7+11	2	0+1	0
30	FW	(Senegal) SEN	Khouma Babacar	25	3	17+8	3	0	0
Players transferred out during the season
2	DF	(Italy) ITA	Davide Riccardi	3	0	0+1	0	2	0
6	DF	(Romania) ROU	Romario Benzar	4	0	1+2	0	1	0
19	FW	(Italy) ITA	Andrea La Mantia	13	2	6+6	2	1	0
20	FW	(Lithuania) LTU	Edgaras Dubickas	2	0	0+1	0	1	0
23	MF	(Italy) ITA	Andrea Tabanelli	14	1	11+2	1	0+1	0
28	DF	(Italy) ITA	Riccardo Fiamozzi	1	0	0	0	0+1	0
32	FW	(Italy) ITA	Simone Lo Faso	1	0	0	0	1	0
85	MF	(France) FRA	Giannelli Imbula	4	1	1+2	0	1	1

Last updated: 2 August 2020
Source: Competitions

=== Goalscorers ===
Rank	No.	Pos	Nat	Name	Serie A	Coppa Italia	Total
1	8	MF	(Italy)	Marco Mancosu	14	0	14
2	9	FW	(Italy)	Gianluca Lapadula	11	2	13
3	10	FW	(Italy)	Filippo Falco	3	1	4
4	27	DF	(Italy)	Marco Calderoni	3	0	3
5	17	FW	(Brazil)	Diego Farias	2	0	2
5	19	FW	(Italy)	Andrea La Mantia	2	0	2
5	30	FW	(Senegal)	Khouma Babacar	2	0	2
8	5	DF	(Italy)	Fabio Lucioni	1	0	1
8	14	MF	(Italy)	Alessandro Deiola	1	0	1
8	23	MF	(Italy)	Andrea Tabanelli	1	0	1
8	37	DF	(Slovenia)	Žan Majer	0	1	1
8	72	MF	(Czech Republic)	Antonín Barák	1	0	1
8	88	MF	(France)	Giannelli Imbula	0	1	1
Own goal					0	0	0
Totals					30	5	35

Last updated: 9 February 2020

=== Clean sheets ===
Rank	No.	Pos	Nat	Name	Serie A	Coppa Italia	Total
1	21	GK	(Brazil)	Gabriel	1	1	2
2	22	GK	(Italy)	Mauro Vigorito	1	0	1
Totals					2	1	3

Last updated: 9 February 2020

=== Disciplinary record ===
No.	Pos	Nat	Name	Serie A			Coppa Italia			Total		
No.	Pos	Nat	Name	Booked	(yellow card) (yellow-red card)	Sent off (straight red)	Booked	(yellow card) (yellow-red card)	Sent off (straight red)	Booked	(yellow card) (yellow-red card)	Sent off (straight red)
21	GK	(Brazil)	Gabriel	2	0	0	0	0	0	2	0	0
22	GK	(Italy)	Mauro Vigorito	1	0	0	0	0	0	1	0	0
5	DF	(Italy)	Fabio Lucioni	5	0	0	0	0	0	5	0	0
7	DF	(Italy)	Giulio Donati	1	0	0	0	0	0	1	0	0
13	DF	(Italy)	Luca Rossettini	5	0	0	0	0	0	5	0	0
16	DF	(Italy)	Biagio Meccariello	2	0	0	0	0	0	2	0	0
27	DF	(Italy)	Marco Calderoni	5	0	0	0	0	0	5	0	0
29	DF	(Italy)	Andrea Rispoli	4	0	0	0	0	0	4	0	0
39	DF	(Italy)	Cristian Dell'Orco	0	1	0	0	0	0	0	1	0
4	MF	(Italy)	Jacopo Petriccione	7	0	0	0	0	0	7	0	0
8	MF	(Italy)	Marco Mancosu	2	0	0	0	0	0	2	0	0
11	MF	(Ukraine)	Yevhen Shakhov	2	0	0	0	0	0	2	0	0
14	MF	(Italy)	Alessandro Deiola	1	0	0	0	0	0	1	0	0
23	MF	(Italy)	Andrea Tabanelli	4	0	0	0	0	0	4	0	0
37	MF	(Slovenia)	Žan Majer	6	0	0	1	0	0	7	0	0
77	MF	(Greece)	Panagiotis Tachtsidis	4	1	0	0	0	0	4	1	0
88	MF	(France)	Gianelli Imbula	0	0	0	1	0	0	1	0	0
9	FW	(Italy)	Gianluca Lapadula	6	0	1	0	0	0	6	0	1
17	FW	(Brazil)	Diego Farias	2	0	1	0	0	0	2	0	1
19	FW	(Italy)	Andrea La Mantia	1	0	0	1	0	0	2	0	0
30	FW	(Senegal)	Khouma Babacar	2	0	0	0	0	0	2	0	0
Totals				62	2	2	3	0	0	65	2	2

Last updated: 9 February 2020
