= 2019–20 Venezia FC season =

Venezia
- Chairman: Duncan Niederauer
- Head coach: Alessio Dionisi
- Stadium: Stadio Pierluigi Penzo
- Serie B: 11th
- Coppa Italia: Second round
- Top goalscorer: League: Mattia Aramu (11); All: Mattia Aramu (13)
| Home colours | Away colours |

The 2019–20 season was Venezia F.C.'s third consecutive season in second division of the Italian football league, the Serie B, and the 113th as a football club.

== Players ==
=== First-team quad ===
As of 31 January 2020

Note: Flags indicate national team as defined under FIFA eligibility rules; some limited exceptions apply. Players may hold more than one non-FIFA nationality.

| No. | Pos. | Nation | Player |
|---|---|---|---|
| 1 | GK | BRA | Bruno Bertinato |
| 2 | DF | ITA | Alessandro Fiordaliso (on loan from Torino) |
| 3 | DF | ITA | Nicolò Casale (on loan from Verona) |
| 4 | MF | ARG | Franco Zuculini |
| 5 | MF | ITA | Antonio Junior Vacca |
| 6 | MF | ROU | Sergiu Suciu |
| 7 | FW | ITA | Yuri Senesi |
| 8 | MF | ITA | Fabrizio Caligara (on loan from Cagliari) |
| 9 | FW | ITA | Adriano Montalto (on loan from Cremonese) |
| 10 | FW | ITA | Mattia Aramu |
| 11 | DF | ITA | Cristian Molinaro |
| 12 | GK | ITA | Luca Lezzerini |
| 13 | DF | ITA | Marco Modolo |
| 14 | DF | ITA | Gian Filippo Felicioli |
| 15 | DF | ITA | Antonio Marino |

| No. | Pos. | Nation | Player |
|---|---|---|---|
| 16 | MF | ITA | Luca Fiordilino |
| 17 | FW | ITA | Gianmarco Zigoni |
| 18 | FW | ITA | Gaetano Monachello (on loan from Atalanta) |
| 19 | FW | ITA | Samuele Longo (on loan from Inter) |
| 20 | DF | ITA | Davide Riccardi (on loan from Lecce) |
| 21 | DF | ITA | Michele Cremonesi |
| 22 | GK | ITA | Alberto Pomini |
| 23 | MF | ITA | Youssef Maleh |
| 25 | MF | ITA | Lorenzo Lollo |
| 26 | MF | ITA | Marco Firenze (on loan from Salernitana) |
| 28 | FW | ITA | Alessandro Capello |
| 32 | DF | ITA | Pietro Ceccaroni (on loan from Spezia) |
| 33 | DF | SRB | Ivan Lakićević (on loan from Genoa) |
| 34 | DF | ITA | Mario De Marino |
| 35 | FW | POR | Alexandre Pimenta |

=== Out on loan ===
Note: Flags indicate national team as defined under FIFA eligibility rules; some limited exceptions apply. Players may hold more than one non-FIFA nationality.

| No. | Pos. | Nation | Player |
|---|---|---|---|
| — | GK | ITA | Cristian Amatori (at Arzignano) |
| — | DF | ITA | Emanuele Cigagna (at Pontedera) |
| — | MF | ITA | Francesco Di Mariano (at Juve Stabia, obligation to buy) |
| — | MF | ITA | Gabriele Mancin (at Porto Viro) |

| No. | Pos. | Nation | Player |
|---|---|---|---|
| — | MF | ITA | Filippo Serena (at Pontedera) |
| — | FW | ITA | Riccardo Bocalon (at Pordenone) |
| — | FW | SCO | Harvey St Clair (at Kilmarnock) |

== Pre-season and friendlies ==
Win Draw Loss

| 3 August 2019 Friendly | Venezia (Italy) | 1–0 | (Italy) Empoli | Vigasio, Italy |
| 18:30 CEST (UTC+2) | | | | Stadium: Stadio Comunale di Vigasio |

== Competitions ==
=== Overall record ===
| Competition | First match | Last match | Starting round | Final position | Record | | | | | | | |
| Competition | First match | Last match | Starting round | Final position | Pld | W | D | L | GF | GA | GD | Win % |
|---|---|---|---|---|---|---|---|---|---|---|---|---|
| Serie B | 24 August 2019 | 31 July 2020 | Matchday 1 | 11th | 38 | 12 | 14 | 12 | 37 | 40 | −3 | 31.58 |
| Coppa Italia | 11 August 2019 | 17 August 2019 | First round | First round | 2 | 1 | 0 | 1 | 3 | 4 | −1 | 50.00 |
| Total | | | | | 40 | 13 | 14 | 13 | 40 | 44 | −4 | 32.50 |

Source: Soccerway

=== Serie A ===
==== League table ====
| Pos | Team | Pld | W | D | L | GF | GA | GD | Pts |
|---|---|---|---|---|---|---|---|---|---|
| 9 | Pisa | 38 | 14 | 12 | 12 | 49 | 45 | +4 | 54 (Note: Head-to-head points: Empoli 9, Frosinone 5, Pisa 2.) |
| 10 | Salernitana | 38 | 14 | 10 | 14 | 53 | 50 | +3 | 52 |
| 11 | Venezia | 38 | 12 | 14 | 12 | 37 | 40 | −3 | 50 |
| 12 | Cremonese | 38 | 12 | 13 | 13 | 42 | 43 | −1 | 49 |
| 13 | Virtus Entella | 38 | 12 | 12 | 14 | 46 | 50 | −4 | 48 |

Source: Lega Serie B (in Italian) SOCCERWAY (in English)
Rules for classification: 1) Points; 2) Head-to-head points; 3) Head-to-head goal difference; 4) Goal difference; 5) Goals scored; 6) Draw.

==== Results summary ====
| Overall | | | | | | | | Home | | | | | | Away | | | | | |
| Pld | W | D | L | GF | GA | GD | Pts | W | D | L | GF | GA | GD | W | D | L | GF | GA | GD |
|---|---|---|---|---|---|---|---|---|---|---|---|---|---|---|---|---|---|---|---|
| 38 | 12 | 14 | 12 | 37 | 40 | −3 | 50 | 5 | 6 | 8 | 18 | 24 | −6 | 7 | 8 | 4 | 19 | 16 | +3 |

Source: Serie B

==== Results by round ====
| Round | 1 | 2 | 3 | 4 | 5 | 6 | 7 | 8 | 9 | 10 | 11 | 12 | 13 | 14 | 15 | 16 | 17 | 18 | 19 | 20 | 21 | 22 | 23 | 24 | 25 | 26 | 27 | 28 | 29 | 30 | 31 | 32 | 33 | 34 | 35 | 36 | 37 | 38 |
|---|---|---|---|---|---|---|---|---|---|---|---|---|---|---|---|---|---|---|---|---|---|---|---|---|---|---|---|---|---|---|---|---|---|---|---|---|---|---|
| Ground | H | A | H | A | A | H | A | H | A | H | A | H | A | H | A | H | A | H | A | A | H | A | H | H | A | H | A | H | A | H | A | H | A | H | A | H | A | H |
| Result | L | W | L | D | W | D | D | W | L | L | D | W | D | L | D | D | L | L | W | D | D | W | L | D | W | D | L | L | D | W | W | L | D | D | W | W | L | W |
| Position | 15 | 13 | 13 | 14 | 11 | 12 | 14 | 8 | 11 | 14 | 14 | 13 | 12 | 14 | 15 | 16 | 17 | 18 | 16 | 15 | 15 | 15 | 16 | 16 | 15 | 15 | 16 | 17 | 16 | 14 | 13 | 14 | 15 | 15 | 14 | 11 | 13 | 11 |

Source: Serie B
A = Away; H = Home; W = Win; D = Draw; L = Loss

==== Matches ====
The league fixtures were announced on 6 August 2019.

| 24 August 2019 1 | Venezia | 1–2 | Cremonese | Venice |
| --:-- CEST (UTC+2) | | | | Stadium: Stadio Pierluigi Penzo |

| 31 August 2019 2 | Trapani | 0–1 | Venezia | Erice |
| --:-- CEST (UTC+2) | | | | Stadium: Polisportivo Provinciale |

| 14 September 2019 3 | Venezia | 0–2 | Chievo | Venice |
| --:-- CEST (UTC+2) | | | | Stadium: Stadio Pierluigi Penzo |

| 21 September 2019 4 | Frosinone | 1–1 | Venezia | Frosinone |
| --:-- CEST (UTC+2) | | | | Stadium: Stadio Benito Stirpe |

| 24 September 2019 5 | Virtus Entella | 0–2 | Venezia | Chiavari |
| --:-- CEST (UTC+2) | | | | Stadium: Comunale Aldo Gastaldi |

| 28 September 2019 6 | Venezia | 1–1 | Pisa | Venice |
| --:-- CEST (UTC+2) | | | | Stadium: Stadio Pierluigi Penzo |

| 5 October 2019 7 | Cosenza | 1–1 | Venezia | Cosenza |
| --:-- CEST (UTC+2) | | | | Stadium: Stadio San Vito-Gigi Marulla |

| 19 October 2019 8 | Venezia | 1–0 | Salernitana | Venice |
| --:-- CEST (UTC+2) | | | | Stadium: Stadio Pierluigi Penzo |

| 26 October 2019 9 | Crotone | 3–2 | Venezia | Crotone |
| --:-- CEST (UTC+2) | | | | Stadium: Stadio Ezio Scida |

| 29 October 2019 10 | Venezia | 1–2 | Pordenone | Venice |
| --:-- CEST (UTC+2) | | | | Stadium: Stadio Pierluigi Penzo |

| 2 November 2019 11 | Ascoli | 1–1 | Venezia | Ascoli Piceno |
| --:-- CEST (UTC+2) | | | | Stadium: Stadio Cino e Lillo Del Duca |

| 9 November 2019 12 | Venezia | 1–0 | Livorno | Venice |
| --:-- CEST (UTC+2) | | | | Stadium: Stadio Pierluigi Penzo |

| 23 November 2019 13 | Empoli | 1–1 | Venezia | Empoli |
| --:-- CEST (UTC+2) | | | | Stadium: Stadio Carlo Castellani |

| 30 November 2019 14 | Venezia | 0–2 | Benevento | Venice |
| --:-- CEST (UTC+2) | | | | Stadium: Stadio Pierluigi Penzo |

| 7 December 2019 15 | Pescara | 2–2 | Venezia | Pescara |
| --:-- CEST (UTC+2) | | | | Stadium: Stadio Adriatico – Giovanni Cornacchia |

| 14 December 2019 16 | Venezia | 0–0 | Spezia | Venice |
| --:-- CEST (UTC+2) | | | | Stadium: Stadio Pierluigi Penzo |

| 21 December 2019 17 | Juve Stabia | 2–0 | Venezia | Castellammare di Stabia |
| --:-- CEST (UTC+2) | | | | Stadium: Romeo Menti |

| 26 December 2019 18 | Venezia | 1–2 | Cittadella | Venice |
| --:-- CEST (UTC+2) | | | | Stadium: Stadio Pierluigi Penzo |

| 29 December 2019 19 | Perugia | 0–1 | Venezia | Perugia |
| --:-- CEST (UTC+2) | | | | Stadium: Stadio Renato Curi |

| 18 January 2020 20 | Cremonese | 0–0 | Venezia | Cremona |
| --:-- CEST (UTC+2) | | | | Stadium: Stadio Giovanni Zini |

| 25 January 2020 21 | Venezia | 1–1 | Trapani | Venice |
| --:-- CEST (UTC+2) | | | | Stadium: Stadio Pierluigi Penzo |

| 1 February 2020 22 | Chievo | 0–1 | Venezia | Verona |
| --:-- CEST (UTC+2) | | | | Stadium: Stadio Marcantonio Bentegodi |

| 8 February 2020 23 | Venezia | 0–1 | Frosinone | Venice |
| --:-- CEST (UTC+2) | | | | Stadium: Stadio Pierluigi Penzo |

| 15 February 2020 24 | Venezia | 2–2 | Virtus Entella | Venice |
| --:-- CEST (UTC+2) | | | | Stadium: Stadio Pierluigi Penzo |

| 22 February 2020 25 | Pisa | 1–2 | Venezia | Pisa |
| --:-- CEST (UTC+2) | | | | Stadium: Arena Garibaldi |

| 29 February 2020 26 | Venezia | 1–1 | Cosenza | Venice |
| --:-- CEST (UTC+2) | | | | Stadium: Stadio Pierluigi Penzo |

| 3 March 2020 27 | Salernitana | 2–0 | Venezia | Salerno |
| --:-- CEST (UTC+2) | | | | Stadium: Stadio Arechi |

| 7 March 2020 28 | Venezia | 1–3 | Crotone | Venice |
| --:-- CEST (UTC+2) | | | | Stadium: Stadio Pierluigi Penzo |

| 20 June 2020 29 | Pordenone | 0–0 | Venezia | Pordenone |
| --:-- CEST (UTC+2) | | | | Stadium: Stadio Guido Teghil |

| 26 June 2020 30 | Venezia | 2–1 | Ascoli | Venice |
| --:-- CEST (UTC+2) | | | | Stadium: Stadio Pierluigi Penzo |

| 29 June 2020 31 | Livorno | 0–2 | Venezia | Livorno |
| --:-- CEST (UTC+2) | | | | Stadium: Stadio Armando Picchi |

| 3 July 2020 32 | Venezia | 0–2 | Empoli | Venice |
| --:-- CEST (UTC+2) | | | | Stadium: Stadio Pierluigi Penzo |

| 10 July 2020 33 | Benevento | 1–1 | Venezia | Benevento |
| --:-- CEST (UTC+2) | | | | Stadium: Stadio Ciro Vigorito |

| 13 July 2020 34 | Venezia | 1–1 | Pescara | Venice |
| --:-- CEST (UTC+2) | | | | Stadium: Stadio Pierluigi Penzo |

| 17 July 2020 35 | Spezia | 0–1 | Venezia | La Spezia |
| --:-- CEST (UTC+2) | | | | Stadium: Stadio Alberto Picco |

| 24 July 2020 36 | Venezia | 1–0 | Juve Stabia | Venice |
| --:-- CEST (UTC+2) | | | | Stadium: Stadio Pierluigi Penzo |

| 27 July 2020 37 | Cittadella | 1–0 | Venezia | Cittadella |
| --:-- CEST (UTC+2) | | | | Stadium: Stadio Pier Cesare Tombolato |

| 31 July 2020 38 | Venezia | 3–1 | Perugia | Venice |
| --:-- CEST (UTC+2) | | | | Stadium: Stadio Pierluigi Penzo |

=== Coppa Italia ===
| 11 August 2019 Second round | Venezia | 2–1 | Catania | Venice |
| 19:00 CEST (UTC+2) | Aramu 3'; Zuculini 56' | | Silvestri 41' | Stadium: Stadio Pier Luigi Penzo |

| 17 August 2019 Third round | Parma | 3–1 | Venezia | Parma |
| 18:00 CEST (UTC+2) | Gervinho 10', 72'; Iacoponi 22' | Report | Aramu 24' (pen.) | Stadium: Stadio Ennio Tardini; Attendance: 5,449; Referee: Paolo Valeri |
