= 2019–20 Genoa CFC season =

Genoa
2019–20 season
- President: Enrico Preziosi
- Manager: Aurelio Andreazzoli (until 22 October); Thiago Motta (22 October – 28 December); Davide Nicola (from 28 December)
- Stadium: Stadio Luigi Ferraris
- Serie A: 17th
- Coppa Italia: Round of 16
- Top goalscorer: League: Goran Pandev (9); All: Domenico Criscito (10)
Home colours	Away colours	Third colours

The 2019–20 Genoa CFC season was the club's thirteenth consecutive season in Serie A. The club competed in Serie A, and was eliminated in the round of 16 in the Coppa Italia.

Former Roma and Empoli coach Aurelio Andreazzoli was hired to replace coach Cesare Prandelli on 14 June 2019.

The 2019–2020 season for Genoa was a challenging one, as the team found themselves embroiled in a relegation battle for the majority of the campaign. The team finished in 17th place in the Serie A standings, just one point above the drop zone, and narrowly avoided relegation to Serie B.

The season started off with Genoa securing a 3–1 victory over Roma in their opening fixture, but then, they failed to win any of their next seven matches. The team struggled to find consistency throughout the season, with their defense in particular proving to be a weakness. They conceded a total of 64 goals over the course of the campaign, the second-highest total in the league.

Despite their struggles, there were a few bright spots for Genoa during the 2019–2020 season. Striker Andrea Pinamonti emerged as a key player for the team, scoring seven goals in 26 league appearances. Midfielder Lasse Schöne also made a positive impact after joining the club from Ajax in the summer. In addition, the team showed resilience in the latter stages of the season, picking up important wins over the likes of Sampdoria and Lecce to secure their Serie A status.

== Players ==
=== Squad information ===
As of 9 February 2020
Appearances include league matches only

No.	Name	Nat	Position(s)	Date of birth (age)	Signed from	Signed in	Contract ends	Apps.	Goals	Notes
Goalkeepers
1	Mattia Perin	(Italy)	GK	10 November 1992 (age 33)	(Italy) Juventus	2020	2020	6	0	Loan
22	Federico Marchetti	(Italy)	GK	7 February 1983 (age 43)	(Italy) Lazio	2018	2020	4	0	
93	Jandrei	(Brazil)	GK	1 March 1993 (age 33)	(Brazil) Chapecoense	2019	2021	1	0	
Defenders
2	Cristián Zapata	(Colombia)	CB	30 September 1986 (age 39)	(Italy) Milan	2019	2021	12	1	
3	Antonio Barreca	(Italy)	LB	16 August 1994 (age 31)	(France) Monaco	2019	2020	9	0	Loan
4	Domenico Criscito	(Italy)	LB / LWB / LM / CB	30 December 1986 (age 39)	(Russia) Zenit Saint Petersburg	2018	2022	204	16	Captain
5	Edoardo Goldaniga	(Italy)	CB	2 November 1993 (age 32)	(Italy) Sassuolo	2019	2020	3	0	Loan
14	Davide Biraschi	(Italy)	CB	2 July 1994 (age 31)	(Italy) Avellino	2016	2022	72	0	
17	Cristian Romero	(Argentina)	CB	27 April 1998 (age 28)	(Italy) Juventus	2018	2020	47	2	Loan
18	Paolo Ghiglione	(Italy)	RB / RM / LM	2 February 1997 (age 29)	(Italy) Frosinone	2019	2021	21	0	
32	Peter Ankersen	(Denmark)	RB / LB	22 September 1990 (age 35)	(Denmark) Copenhagen	2019	2021	14	0	
55	Andrea Masiello	(Italy)	CB / RB	5 February 1986 (age 40)	(Italy) Atalanta	2020	2022	2	0	
92	Adama Soumaoro	(France)	CB / RB / LB	18 June 1992 (age 33)	(France) Lille	2020	2020	1	0	Loan
98	Nicholas Rizzo	(Italy)	CB / LB	11 March 2000 (age 26)	(Italy) Internazionale	2019	2024	0	0	
Midfielders
8	Lukas Lerager	(Denmark)	CM	12 July 1993 (age 32)	(France) Bordeaux	2019	2023	25	1	
15	Filip Jagiełło	(Poland)	CM / AM / DM	8 August 1997 (age 28)	(Poland) Zagłębie Lubin	2019	2023	5	0	
16	Sebastian Eriksson	(Sweden)	DM / CM / CB	31 January 1989 (age 37)	(Sweden) IFK Göteborg	2020		0	0	
20	Lasse Schöne	(Denmark)	DM / CM / AM	27 May 1986 (age 39)	(Netherlands) Ajax	2019	2021	21	1	
21	Ivan Radovanović	(Serbia)	DM / CM	29 August 1988 (age 37)	(Italy) Chievo	2019	2021	31	0	
27	Stefano Sturaro	(Italy)	CM / RB / DM	9 March 1993 (age 33)	(Italy) Juventus	2019	2022	14	2	Loan
29	Francesco Cassata	(Italy)	CM / DM / LM	16 July 1997 (age 28)	(Italy) Sassuolo	2019	2020	14	0	Loan
33	Marko Pajač	(Croatia)	LB / CM / LM	11 May 1993 (age 32)	(Italy) Cagliari	2019	2020	11	0	Loan
65	Nicolò Rovella	(Italy)	DM	4 December 2001 (age 24)	(Italy) Youth Sector	2019		1	0	
85	Valon Behrami	(Switzerland)	DM / CM / RM	19 April 1985 (age 41)	Unattached	2020	2020	4	0	
Forwards
9	Antonio Sanabria	(Paraguay)	CF	4 March 1996 (age 30)	(Spain) Real Betis	2019	2020	29	5	Loan
10	Iago Falque	(Spain)	RW / LW / SS	4 January 1990 (age 36)	(Italy) Torino	2020	2020	0	0	Loan
19	Goran Pandev	(North Macedonia)	SS / AM / RW	27 July 1983 (age 42)	(Turkey) Galatasaray	2015	2019	112	19	Vice-captain
23	Mattia Destro	(Italy)	CF	20 March 1991 (age 35)	(Italy) Bologna	2020	2020	1	0	Loan
30	Andrea Favilli	(Italy)	ST	17 May 1997 (age 28)	(Italy) Juventus	2018	2023	17	0	
56	Denilho Cleonise	(Netherlands)	LW / RW	8 December 2001 (age 24)	(Italy) Youth Sector	2019		4	0	
99	Andrea Pinamonti	(Italy)	CF	19 May 1999 (age 26)	(Italy) Internazionale	2019	2021	18	2	Loan
Players transferred during the season
5	Rômulo	(Italy)	CM / RM / RB	22 May 1987 (age 38)	(Italy) Hellas Verona	2018	2020	18	1	
10	Sinan Gümüş	(Germany)	RW / CF / LW	15 January 1994 (age 32)	(Turkey) Galatasaray	2019	2022	3	0	
11	Christian Kouamé	(Ivory Coast)	ST	6 December 1997 (age 28)	(Italy) Cittadella	2018	2023	50	9	
13	Jawad El Yamiq	(Morocco)	CB	29 February 1992 (age 34)	(Morocco) Raja Casablanca	2018	2021	7	0	
23	Sandro	(Brazil)	DM	15 March 1989 (age 37)	(Italy) Benevento	2018	2021	13	0	
25	Rok Vodišek	(Slovenia)	GK	5 December 1998 (age 27)	(Slovenia) Olimpija Ljubljana	2018	2022	0	0	
26	András Schäfer	(Hungary)	LM / LW / CM	13 April 1999 (age 27)	(Hungary) MTK Budapest	2019	2022	0	0	
28	Kevin Agudelo	(Colombia)	CM / DM / LM	14 November 1998 (age 27)	(Colombia) Atlético Huila	2019	2023	11	1	
88	Oscar Hiljemark	(Sweden)	CM	28 June 1992 (age 33)	(Italy) Palermo	2017	2020	46	3	
91	Riccardo Saponara	(Italy)	AM	21 December 1991 (age 34)	(Italy) Fiorentina	2019	2020	5	0	Loan
97	Ionuț Radu	(Romania)	GK	28 May 1997 (age 28)	(Italy) Internazionale	2018	2020	51	0	Loan

== Pre-season and friendlies ==
20 July 2019 Friendly	Lyon (France)	3–4	(Italy) Genoa	Gueugnon, France
19:00 CEST (UTC+2)	Mendes 11'; Yanga-Mbiwa 51'; Fofana 61'	Report	Criscito 15' (pen.); Ghiglione 65'; Hiljemark 71'; Kouamé 86'	Stadium: Stade Jean Laville

2 August 2019 Friendly	Nantes (France)	1–1	(Italy) Genoa	Nantes, France
19:00 CEST (UTC+2)	Homawoo (yellow card) 66'; Lima 84'; Kolo (yellow card) 85'	Report	Lerager 28'; Cassata (yellow card) 68'; El Yamiq (yellow card) 80'; Romero (yellow card) 82'	Stadium: Stade de la Beaujoire; Referee: Jérémy Stinat (France)

4 August 2019 Friendly	Bordeaux (France)	2–3	(Italy) Genoa	Bordeaux, France
20:00 CEST (UTC+2)	Hwang 36'; De Préville 58'	Report	Pinamonti 23'; Kouamé 34'; Hiljemark 81'	Stadium: Matmut Atlantique

8 August 2019 Friendly	Reggio Audace (Italy)	1–2	(Italy) Genoa	Reggio Emilia, Italy
19:45 CEST (UTC+2)	Haruna 82'	Report	Ghiglione 35'; Pinamonti 53'	Stadium: Stadio Mirabello; Attendance: 2,000

6 September 2019 Friendly	Entella (Italy)	3–2	(Italy) Genoa	Chiavari, Italy
20:00 CEST (UTC+2)	De Luca 30'; Toscano 48'; Mancosu 88' (pen.)	Report	Favilli 13', 37'	Stadium: Stadio Comunale; Attendance: 2,000

== Competitions ==
=== Serie A ===
==== League table ====
Pos	Team	Pld	W	D	L	GF	GA	GD	Pts	Qualification or relegation
15	Sampdoria	38	12	6	20	48	65	−17	42	
16	Torino	38	11	7	20	46	68	−22	40	
17	Genoa	38	10	9	19	47	73	−26	39	
18	Lecce (R)	38	9	8	21	52	85	−33	35	Relegation to Serie B
19	Brescia (R)	38	6	7	25	35	79	−44	25	Relegation to Serie B

Source: Serie A, Soccerway
Rules for classification: 1) Points; 2) Head-to-head points; 3) Head-to-head goal difference; 4) Goal difference; 5) Goals scored; 6) Draw. (Note: Head-to-head record is used only after all the matches between the teams in question have been played)
(R) Relegated

==== Results summary ====
Overall								Home						Away					
Pld	W	D	L	GF	GA	GD	Pts	W	D	L	GF	GA	GD	W	D	L	GF	GA	GD
38	10	9	19	47	73	−26	39	7	1	11	24	31	−7	3	8	8	23	42	−19

Last updated: 2 August 2020.
Source: Competitive matches

==== Results by round ====
Round	1	2	3	4	5	6	7	8	9	10	11	12	13	14	15	16	17	18	19	20	21	22	23	24	25	26	27	28	29	30	31	32	33	34	35	36	37	38
Ground	A	H	H	A	H	A	H	A	H	A	H	A	A	H	A	H	A	H	A	H	A	A	H	A	H	A	H	A	H	A	H	H	A	H	A	H	A	H
Result	D	W	L	L	D	L	L	L	W	L	L	D	D	L	D	L	L	W	L	L	D	D	W	W	L	W	L	D	L	D	L	W	L	W	W	L	L	W
Position	9	5	10	14	17	19	19	19	17	17	17	17	18	18	19	19	20	19	18	20	19	18	18	18	18	17	17	17	17	17	18	17	17	17	17	17	17	17

Updated to match(es) played on 2 August 2020. Source: Competitive matches
A = Away; H = Home; W = Win; D = Draw; L = Loss

==== Matches ====
25 August 2019 1	Roma	3–3	Genoa	Rome
20:45 CEST (UTC+02:00)	Ünder 6'; Džeko 30'; Florenzi (yellow card) 38'; Jesus (yellow card) 42'; Kolarov 49'; Pellegrini (yellow card) 74'	Report	Pinamonti 16'; Criscito 43' (pen.); Romero (yellow card) 56'; Kouamé 70'	Stadium: Stadio Olimpico; Attendance: 38,779; Referee: Gianpaolo Calvarese

1 September 2019 2	Genoa	2–1	Fiorentina	Genoa
20:45 CEST (UTC+02:00)	Zapata 11'; Romero (yellow card) 16'; Criscito (yellow card) 45'; Kouamé 65'	Report	Pulgar 76' (pen.)	Stadium: Stadio Luigi Ferraris; Attendance: 22,000; Referee: Piero Giacomelli

15 September 2019 3	Genoa	1–2	Atalanta	Genoa
12:30 CEST (UTC+02:00)	Romero (yellow card) 31'; C. Zapata (yellow card) 63'; Criscito 90+1' (pen.); Pandev (yellow card) 90+2'	Report	Masiello (yellow card) 44'; Iličić (yellow card) 45+1'; Hateboer (yellow card) 48'; Muriel 64' (pen.); D. Zapata 90+5'	Stadium: Stadio Luigi Ferraris; Attendance: 23,395; Referee: Michael Fabbri

20 September 2019 4	Cagliari	3–1	Genoa	Cagliari
20:45 CEST (UTC+02:00)	João Pedro (yellow card) 38', (goal) 87'; Simeone 46'; Zapata 85' (o.g.)	Report	Saponara (yellow card) 73'; Kouamé 83'	Stadium: Sardegna Arena; Attendance: 14,574; Referee: Gianluca Manganiello

25 September 2019 5	Genoa	0–0	Bologna	Genoa
21:00 CEST (UTC+02:00)	Lerager (yellow card) 28'; Zapata (yellow card) 42'; Ghiglione (yellow card) 68'; Romero (yellow card) 73'; Radovanović (yellow card) 79'	Report	Tomiyasu (yellow card) 2'; Denswil (yellow card) 46'; Poli (yellow card) 79'; Olsen (yellow card) 90+2'	Stadium: Stadio Luigi Ferraris; Attendance: 20,497; Referee: Davide Massa

29 September 2019 6	Lazio	4–0	Genoa	Rome
15:00 CEST (UTC+02:00)	Milinković-Savić 7'; Radu 40'; Caicedo 59', (yellow card) 90+1'; Immobile 78'	Report	El Yamiq (yellow card) 29'; Sanabria (yellow card) 73'	Stadium: Stadio Olimpico; Attendance: 22,000; Referee: Luca Pairetto

5 October 2019 7	Genoa	1–2	Milan	Genoa
20:45 CEST (UTC+02:00)	Zapata (yellow card) 23'; Schöne 41', (yellow card) 67'; Saponara (red card) 45+2'; Biraschi (red card) 57'; Lerager (yellow card) 64'; Romero (yellow card) 88'	Report	Calabria (yellow card) 43' (yellow-red card) 79'; Hernandez 51'; Kessié 57' (pen.); Biglia (yellow card) 62'; Paquetá (yellow card) 84'; Castillejo (red card) 90+4'	Stadium: Stadio Luigi Ferraris; Attendance: 22,486; Referee: Maurizio Mariani
Note: Riccardo Saponara and Samu Castillejo were sent off for dissent while substitutes.

20 October 2019 8	Parma	5–1	Genoa	Parma
18:00 CEST (UTC+02:00)	Scozzarella (yellow card) 28'; Kucka 38'; Cornelius 42', 45+1', 50'; Kulusevski 79'	Report	Radovanović (yellow card) 23'; Pinamonti 52'; Kouamé (yellow card) 83'	Stadium: Stadio Ennio Tardini; Attendance: 15,299; Referee: Paolo Valeri

26 October 2019 9	Genoa	3–1	Brescia	Genoa
20:45 CEST (UTC+02:00)	Ankersen (yellow card) 42'; Ghiglione (yellow card) 45+3'; Agudelo (yellow card) 60', (goal) 66'; Kouamé 75'; Pandev 79', (yellow card) 80'; Romero (yellow card) 82'; Radu (yellow card) 87'	Report	Bisoli (yellow card) 18'; Tonali (yellow card) 22', (goal) 34'; Balotelli (yellow card) 67'; Matri (yellow card) 90+3'	Stadium: Stadio Luigi Ferraris; Attendance: 20,949; Referee: Rosario Abisso

30 October 2019 10	Juventus	2–1	Genoa	Turin
21:00 CET (UTC+01:00)	Bentancur (yellow card) 28'; Bonucci 36', (yellow card) 89'; Rugani (yellow card) 38'; Rabiot (yellow card) 76' (yellow-red card) 87'; Ronaldo 90+6' (pen.)	Report	Cassata (yellow card) 4' (yellow-red card) 51'; Kouamé 41'; Pandev (yellow card) 56'; Marchetti (red card) 58'	Stadium: Allianz Stadium; Attendance: 38,732; Referee: Antonio Giua
Note: Federico Marchetti was sent off for dissent while a substitute.

3 November 2019 11	Genoa	1–3	Udinese	Genoa
15:00 CET (UTC+01:00)	Pandev 22'	Report	Sema (yellow card) 25', (goal) 87'; De Paul 32'; Nuytinck (yellow card) 48'; Lasagna 90+4'	Stadium: Stadio Luigi Ferraris; Attendance: 20,030; Referee: Fabrizio Pasqua

9 November 2019 12	Napoli	0–0	Genoa	Naples
20:45 CET (UTC+01:00)	Llorente (yellow card) 81'	Report	Schöne (yellow card) 15'; Cassata (yellow card) 79'; Cleonise (yellow card) 83'; Lerager (yellow card) 85'	Stadium: Stadio San Paolo; Attendance: 22,947; Referee: Gianpaolo Calvarese

25 November 2019 13	SPAL	1–1	Genoa	Ferrara
20:45 CET (UTC+01:00)	Petagna (yellow card) 28', (goal) 55' (pen.); Missiroli (yellow card) 41'	Report	Sturaro 57'; Ghiglione (yellow card) 61'	Stadium: Stadio Paolo Mazza; Attendance: 12,423; Referee: Piero Giacomelli

30 November 2019 14	Genoa	0–1	Torino	Genoa
18:00 CET (UTC+01:00)	Sturaro (yellow card) 75'; Agudelo (yellow card) 90'	Report	Baselli (yellow card) 60'; Bremer 77'; Edera (yellow card) 90' (yellow-red card) 90+5'	Stadium: Stadio Luigi Ferraris; Attendance: 20,000; Referee: Davide Massa

8 December 2019 15	Lecce	2–2	Genoa	Lecce
12:30 CET (UTC+01:00)	La Mantia (yellow card) 21'; Lucioni (yellow card) 45+4'; Tachtsidis (yellow card) 55'; Falco 60'; Petriccione (yellow card) 65'; Tabanelli 70', (yellow card) 71'	Report	Pajač (yellow card) 14'; Agudelo (yellow card) 18' (yellow-red card) 69'; Pandev 31', (yellow card) 73' (yellow-red card) 77'; Criscito 45+5' (pen.), (yellow card) 67'	Stadium: Stadio Via del Mare; Attendance: 21,740; Referee: Gianluca Rocchi

14 December 2019 16	Genoa	0–1	Sampdoria	Genoa
20:45 CET (UTC+01:00)	Ghiglione (yellow card) 8'; Cassata (yellow card) 22'; Criscito (yellow card) 46'; Romero (yellow card) 82'; Cleonise (yellow card) 90+2'	Report	Vieira (yellow card) 26'; Ramírez (yellow card) 53'; Colley (yellow card) 68'; Gabbiadini 85'	Stadium: Stadio Luigi Ferraris; Attendance: 30,658; Referee: Daniele Doveri

21 December 2019 17	Internazionale	4–0	Genoa	Milan
18:00 CET (UTC+01:00)	Lukaku 31', 71'; Gagliardini 33'; Bastoni (yellow card) 36'; Esposito 64' (pen.)	Report	Cassata (yellow card) 34'; Romero (yellow card) 43'; Agudelo (yellow card) 63'; Favilli (yellow card) 88'	Stadium: San Siro; Attendance: 57,490; Referee: Luca Pairetto

5 January 2020 18	Genoa	2–1	Sassuolo	Genoa
18:00 CET (UTC+01:00)	Criscito (yellow card) 20', (goal) 29' (pen.); Sturaro (yellow card) 37'; Sanabria (yellow card) 51'; Pandev 86'; Biraschi (yellow card) 90+6'	Report	Duncan (yellow card) 19'; Locatelli (yellow card) 24'; Obiang 33', (yellow card) 90+1'; Romagna (yellow card) 77'; Toljan (yellow card) 85'; Berardi (red card) 90+7'	Stadium: Stadio Luigi Ferraris; Attendance: 21,033; Referee: Massimiliano Irrati

12 January 2020 19	Hellas Verona	2–1	Genoa	Verona
18:15 CET (UTC+01:00)	Rrahmani (yellow card) 4'; Amrabat (yellow card) 49'; Verre 55' (pen.), (yellow card) 56'; Zaccagni 65'	Report	Criscito (yellow card) 25'; Schöne (yellow card) 28'; Sanabria 41'; Pandev (yellow card) 52'; Behrami (yellow card) 73'; Cassata (yellow card) 77'; Favilli (yellow card) 79'	Stadium: Stadio Marc'Antonio Bentegodi; Attendance: 14,849; Referee: Maurizio Mariani

19 January 2020 20	Genoa	1–3	Roma	Genoa
18:00 CET (UTC+01:00)	Romero (yellow card) 38'; Pandev 45'; Cassata (yellow card) 61'	Report	Ünder 6'; Veretout (yellow card) 26'; Biraschi 44' (o.g.); Džeko (yellow card) 73', (goal) 74'; López (yellow card) 81'	Stadium: Stadio Luigi Ferraris; Attendance: 20,951; Referee: Fabio Maresca

25 January 2020 21	Fiorentina	0–0	Genoa	Florence
18:00 CET (UTC+01:00)	Pezzella (yellow card) 14'; Milenković (yellow card) 38'; Venuti (yellow card) 75'; Cáceres (yellow card) 90+4'	Report	Schöne (yellow card) 31'; Favilli (yellow card) 39'; Sturaro (yellow card) 90+2'	Stadium: Stadio Artemio Franchi; Attendance: 32,903; Referee: Daniele Orsato

2 February 2020 22	Atalanta	2–2	Genoa	Bergamo
15:00 CET (UTC+01:00)	Toloi 13'; Iličić 35'; Pašalić (yellow card) 52'; De Roon (yellow card) 77'	Report	Criscito 19' (pen.), (yellow card) 90+2'; Sanabria 33'; Behrami (yellow card) 53' (yellow-red card) 82'; Romero (yellow card) 76'; Cassata (yellow card) 84'; Perin (yellow card) 89'	Stadium: Gewiss Stadium; Attendance: 18,755; Referee: Davide Massa

9 February 2020 23	Genoa	1–0	Cagliari	Genoa
15:00 CET (UTC+01:00)	Pinamonti (yellow card) 21'; Pandev 43'; Radovanović (yellow card) 82'; Sturaro (yellow card) 90+2'	Report	Cacciatore (yellow card) 16'; Simeone (yellow card) 28'; Nainggolan (yellow card) 54'; Pereiro (yellow card) 78'; Mattiello (yellow card) 79'; Nández (yellow card) 90+3'	Stadium: Stadio Luigi Ferraris; Attendance: 21,301; Referee: Gianpaolo Calvarese

15 February 2020 24	Bologna	0–3	Genoa	Bologna
18:00 CET (UTC+01:00)	Schouten (red card) 34'; Denswil (yellow card) 65' (yellow-red card) 89'; Domínguez (yellow card) 81'	Report	Soumaoro 28', (yellow card) 81'; Ankersen (yellow card) 40'; Sanabria 44'; Goldaniga (yellow card) 53'; Sturaro (yellow card) 57'; Cassata (yellow card) 85'; Criscito 90' (pen.)	Stadium: Stadio Renato Dall'Ara; Attendance: 21,513; Referee: Davide Massa

23 February 2020 25	Genoa	2–3	Lazio	Genoa
12:30 CET (UTC+01:00)	Masiello (yellow card) 28'; Cassata 57'; Soumaoro (yellow card) 69'; Criscito 89' (pen.)	Report	Marušić 2'; Lucas (yellow card) 20'; Immobile 51'; Cataldi 71'; Strakosha (yellow card) 75'	Stadium: Stadio Luigi Ferraris; Attendance: 24,032; Referee: Fabio Maresca

8 March 2020 26	Milan	1–2	Genoa	Milan
15:00 CET (UTC+01:00)	Ibrahimović 77'	Report	Pandev 7'; Cassata 41'	Stadium: San Siro; Attendance: 0 Referee: Daniele Doveri
Note: Match was initially postponed to 13 May from its original date of 1 March due to concerns over the coronavirus pandemic, but was later moved to 8 March to be played behind closed doors.

23 June 2020 27	Genoa	1–4	Parma	Genoa
21:45 CEST (UTC+02:00)	Cassata (yellow card) 32'; Falque 59' (pen.)	Report	Cornelius 18', 33', 53'; Iacoponi (yellow card) 29'; Laurini (yellow card) 59'; Kulusevski 87'	Stadium: Stadio Luigi Ferraris; Attendance: 0 Referee: Piero Giacomelli
Note: Match was postponed to 14 March, then to 23 June, from its original date of 7 March due to schedule shuffling to allow for Milan vs Genoa to be played following its previous postponement due to concerns over the COVID-19 pandemic. All subsequent matches were also shuffled to allow for this accommodation. However, on 9 March, all sports events in Italy were suspended until 3 April. This was the first match played since the COVID-19 pandemic lockdown in Italy.

27 June 2020 28	Brescia	2–2	Genoa	Brescia
17:15 CEST (UTC+02:00)	Donnarumma 10'; Semprini 13'; Matějů (yellow card) 45+1'; Dessena (yellow card) 69'; Bjarnason (yellow card) 75'; Sabelli (yellow card) 86'	Report	Falque 38' (pen.); Zapata (yellow card) 58'; Pinamonti 69' (pen.); Biraschi (yellow card) 71'	Stadium: Stadio Mario Rigamonti; Attendance: 0 Referee: Massimiliano Irrati

30 June 2020 29	Genoa	1–3	Juventus	Genoa
21:45 CEST (UTC+02:00)	Favilli (yellow card) 7'; Schöne (yellow card) 33'; Sturaro (yellow card) 58'; Cassata (yellow card) 70'; Pinamonti 76'; Masiello (yellow card) 80'	Report	Bonucci (yellow card) 45+2'; Dybala 50'; Ronaldo 57'; Douglas Costa 73'	Stadium: Stadio Luigi Ferraris; Attendance: 0 Referee: Gianpaolo Calvarese

5 July 2020 30	Udinese	2–2	Genoa	Udine
19:30 CEST (UTC+02:00)	Sema (yellow card) 10'; Stryger Larsen (yellow card) 25'; Fofana 44', (yellow card) 82'; Lasagna 73'	Report	Goldaniga (yellow card) 42'; Sturaro (yellow card) 63'; Pandev 81'; Pinamonti 90+7'	Stadium: Dacia Arena; Attendance: 0 Referee: Daniele Orsato

8 July 2020 31	Genoa	1–2	Napoli	Genoa
19:30 CEST (UTC+02:00)	Goldaniga 49', (yellow card) 72'	Report	Mertens 45+1'; Lozano 66'	Stadium: Stadio Luigi Ferraris; Attendance: 0 Referee: Maurizio Mariani

12 July 2020 32	Genoa	2–0	SPAL	Genoa
17:15 CEST (UTC+02:00)	Pandev 24'; Schöne 54'; Behrami (yellow card) 67'	Report	Floccari (yellow card) 64'; Cerri (yellow card) 76'	Stadium: Stadio Luigi Ferraris; Attendance: 0 Referee: Marco Guida

16 July 2020 33	Torino	3–0	Genoa	Turin
19:30 CEST (UTC+02:00)	Bremer 32'; Lyanco (yellow card) 53'; Lukić 76'; Zaza (yellow card) 86'; Belotti 90'	Report	Masiello (yellow card) 23'; Goldaniga (yellow card) 26'	Stadium: Stadio Olimpico Grande Torino; Attendance: 0 Referee: Gianluca Rocchi

19 July 2020 34	Genoa	2–1	Lecce	Genoa
19:30 CEST (UTC+02:00)	Sanabria 7'; Lerager (yellow card) 15'; Romero (yellow card) 64'; Gabriel 81' (o.g.)	Report	Petriccione (yellow card) 35'; Saponara (yellow card) 44'; Lucioni (yellow card) 52'; Mancosu 60'	Stadium: Stadio Luigi Ferraris; Attendance: 0 Referee: Daniele Doveri

22 July 2020 35	Sampdoria	1–2	Genoa	Genoa
21:45 CEST (UTC+02:00)	Colley (yellow card) 21'; Gabbiadini 32'; Bereszyński (yellow card) 45+2'; Vieira (yellow card) 46'; Jankto (yellow card) 74'	Report	Criscito 22' (pen.); Lerager (yellow card) 42', (goal) 72'; Biraschi (yellow card) 68'	Stadium: Stadio Luigi Ferraris; Attendance: 0 Referee: Marco Guida

25 July 2020 36	Genoa	0–3	Internazionale	Genoa
19:30 CEST (UTC+02:00)	Criscito (yellow card) 16'; Romero (yellow card) 45+1'	Report	Lukaku 34', 90+3'; Gagliardini (yellow card) 42'; Ranocchia (yellow card) 74'; Sánchez 83'; Handanović (yellow card) 86'	Stadium: Stadio Luigi Ferraris; Attendance: 0 Referee: Davide Massa

29 July 2020 37	Sassuolo	5–0	Genoa	Reggio Emilia
19:30 CEST (UTC+02:00)	Traorè 26'; Berardi 40'; Caputo 66', 77'; Raspadori 74'; Obiang (yellow card) 85'	Report	Romero (yellow card) 15'	Stadium: Mapei Stadium – Città del Tricolore; Attendance: 0 Referee: Fabio Maresca

2 August 2020 38	Genoa	3–0	Hellas Verona	Genoa
20:45 CEST (UTC+02:00)	Sanabria (yellow card) 6', (goal) 13', 25'; Romero 44', (yellow card) 45+3' (yellow-red card) 62'; Masiello (yellow card) 49'; Cassata (red card) 90+1'	Report	Amrabat (red card) 90+1'	Stadium: Stadio Luigi Ferraris; Attendance: 0 Referee: Massimiliano Irrati

=== Coppa Italia ===
16 August 2019 Third round	Genoa	4–1	Imolese	Chiavari
20:30 CEST (UTC+02:00)	Criscito 2' (pen.); Saponara 24'; Ghiglione 29'; Schöne 75'	Report	Alimi 53'	Stadium: Stadio Comunale di Chiavari; Attendance: 5,500; Referee: Luca Pairetto

3 December 2019 Fourth round	Genoa	3–2	Ascoli	Genoa
18:00 CET (UTC+01:00)	Pinamonti 14', 79'; Biraschi (yellow card) 41'; Criscito 72'	Report	Brlek (yellow card) 23'; Troiano (yellow card) 35'; Beretta 48'; Laverone (yellow card) 66'; Criscito 68' (o.g.)	Stadium: Stadio Luigi Ferraris; Attendance: 1,825; Referee: Giovanni Ayroldi

9 January 2020 Round of 16	Torino	1–1 (a.e.t.) (5–3 p)	Genoa	Turin
21:15 CET (UTC+01:00)	De Silvestri 23'; Meïté (yellow card) 29' (yellow-red card) 105+1'; Aina (yellow card) 97'	Report	Favilli 14'; Romero (yellow card) 29'; El Yamiq (yellow card) 62'; Radovanović (yellow card) 107'	Stadium: Stadio Olimpico Grande Torino; Attendance: 3,975; Referee: Juan Luca Sacchi
	Penalties
	Belotti (penalty scored); Millico (penalty scored); Rincón (penalty scored); Aina (penalty scored); Berenguer (penalty scored)		(penalty scored) Destro; (penalty scored) Favilli; (penalty scored) Cassata; (penalty missed) Radovanović

== Statistics ==
=== Appearances and goals ===
No.	Pos	Nat	Player	Total		Serie A		Coppa Italia	
No.	Pos	Nat	Player	Apps	Goals	Apps	Goals	Apps	Goals
Goalkeepers
1	GK	(Italy) ITA	Mattia Perin	21	0	21	0	0	0
22	GK	(Italy) ITA	Federico Marchetti	0	0	0	0	0	0
Defenders
2	DF	(Colombia) COL	Cristián Zapata	22	1	19+1	1	2	0
3	DF	(Italy) ITA	Antonio Barreca	19	0	11+7	0	1	0
4	DF	(Italy) ITA	Domenico Criscito	28	10	24+2	8	2	2
5	DF	(Italy) ITA	Edoardo Goldaniga	14	1	8+5	1	1	0
14	DF	(Italy) ITA	Davide Biraschi	26	0	22+2	0	2	0
17	DF	(Argentina) ARG	Cristian Romero	33	1	30	1	3	0
18	DF	(Italy) ITA	Paolo Ghiglione	27	1	20+5	0	2	1
32	DF	(Denmark) DEN	Peter Ankersen	19	0	11+8	0	0	0
55	DF	(Italy) ITA	Andrea Masiello	15	0	15	0	0	0
92	DF	(France) FRA	Adama Soumaoro	8	1	7+1	1	0	0
Midfielders
8	MF	(Denmark) DEN	Lukas Lerager	22	1	15+6	1	1	0
15	MF	(Poland) POL	Filip Jagiełło	12	0	6+5	0	1	0
16	MF	(Sweden) SWE	Sebastian Eriksson	0	0	0	0	0	0
20	MF	(Denmark) DEN	Lasse Schöne	34	3	29+3	2	2	1
21	MF	(Serbia) SRB	Ivan Radovanović	22	0	15+4	0	1+2	0
27	MF	(Italy) ITA	Stefano Sturaro	18	1	15+1	1	0+2	0
29	MF	(Italy) ITA	Francesco Cassata	26	2	18+6	2	2	0
33	MF	(Croatia) CRO	Marko Pajač	12	0	8+3	0	1	0
65	MF	(Italy) ITA	Nicolò Rovella	3	0	1+1	0	0+1	0
85	MF	(Switzerland) SUI	Valon Behrami	18	0	13+4	0	1	0
Forwards
9	FW	(Paraguay) PAR	Antonio Sanabria	24	6	16+8	6	0	0
10	FW	(Spain) ESP	Iago Falque	10	2	6+4	2	0	0
19	FW	(North Macedonia) MKD	Goran Pandev	35	9	18+16	9	0+1	0
23	FW	(Italy) ITA	Mattia Destro	9	0	1+7	0	0+1	0
30	FW	(Italy) ITA	Andrea Favilli	22	1	7+13	0	1+1	1
56	FW	(Netherlands) NED	Denilho Cleonise	5	0	0+4	0	1	0
99	FW	(Italy) ITA	Andrea Pinamonti	34	7	23+9	5	2	2
Players transferred out during the season
5	MF	(Italy) ITA	Rômulo	2	0	0+1	0	0+1	0
10	FW	(Germany) GER	Sinan Gümüş	3	0	1+2	0	0	0
11	FW	(Ivory Coast) CIV	Christian Kouamé	12	5	10+1	5	1	0
13	DF	(Morocco) MAR	Jawad El Yamiq	4	0	2+1	0	0+1	0
25	GK	(Slovenia) SVN	Rok Vodišek	0	0	0	0	0	0
28	MF	(Colombia) COL	Kevin Agudelo	12	1	7+3	1	2	0
91	MF	(Italy) ITA	Riccardo Saponara	5	1	2+2	0	1	1
93	GK	(Brazil) BRA	Jandrei	1	0	0	0	1	0
97	GK	(Romania) ROU	Ionuț Radu	19	0	17	0	2	0

Last updated: 2 August 2020
Source: Competitions

=== Goalscorers ===
Rank	No.	Pos	Nat	Name	Serie A	Coppa Italia	Total
1	4	DF	(Italy)	Domenico Criscito	5	2	7
2	19	FW	(North Macedonia)	Goran Pandev	7	0	7
3	11	FW	(Ivory Coast)	Christian Kouamé	5	0	5
4	99	FW	(Italy)	Andrea Pinamonti	2	2	4
5	9	FW	(Paraguay)	Antonio Sanabria	2	0	2
5	20	MF	(Denmark)	Lasse Schöne	1	1	2
7	2	DF	(Colombia)	Cristián Zapata	1	0	1
7	18	DF	(Italy)	Paolo Ghiglione	0	1	1
7	27	MF	(Italy)	Stefano Sturaro	1	0	1
7	28	MF	(Colombia)	Kevin Agudelo	1	0	1
7	30	FW	(Italy)	Andrea Favilli	0	1	1
7	91	MF	(Italy)	Riccardo Saponara	0	1	1
Own goal					0	0	0
Totals					24	8	32

Last updated: 9 February 2020

=== Clean sheets ===
Rank	No.	Pos	Nat	Name	Serie A	Coppa Italia	Total
1	1	GK	(Italy)	Mattia Perin	2	0	2
1	97	GK	(Romania)	Ionuț Radu	2	0	2
Totals					4	0	4

Last updated: 9 February 2020

=== Disciplinary record ===
No.	Pos	Nat	Name	Serie A			Coppa Italia			Total		
No.	Pos	Nat	Name	Booked	(yellow card) (yellow-red card)	Sent off (straight red)	Booked	(yellow card) (yellow-red card)	Sent off (straight red)	Booked	(yellow card) (yellow-red card)	Sent off (straight red)
1	GK	(Italy)	Mattia Perin	1	0	0	0	0	0	1	0	0
22	GK	(Italy)	Federico Marchetti	0	0	1	0	0	0	0	0	1
97	GK	(Romania)	Ionuț Radu	1	0	0	0	0	0	1	0	0
2	DF	(Colombia)	Cristián Zapata	3	0	0	0	0	0	3	0	0
4	DF	(Italy)	Domenico Criscito	6	0	0	0	0	0	6	0	0
13	DF	(Morocco)	Jawad El Yamiq	1	0	0	1	0	0	2	0	0
14	DF	(Italy)	Davide Biraschi	1	0	1	1	0	0	2	0	1
17	DF	(Argentina)	Cristian Romero	10	0	0	1	0	0	11	0	0
18	DF	(Italy)	Paolo Ghiglione	4	0	0	0	0	0	4	0	0
32	DF	(Denmark)	Peter Ankersen	1	0	0	0	0	0	1	0	0
8	MF	(Denmark)	Lukas Lerager	3	0	0	0	0	0	3	0	0
20	MF	(Denmark)	Lasse Schöne	4	0	0	0	0	0	4	0	0
21	MF	(Serbia)	Ivan Radovanović	3	0	0	1	0	0	4	0	0
27	MF	(Italy)	Stefano Sturaro	4	0	0	0	0	0	4	0	0
28	MF	(Colombia)	Kevin Agudelo	3	1	0	0	0	0	3	1	0
29	MF	(Italy)	Francesco Cassata	6	1	0	0	0	0	6	1	0
33	MF	(Croatia)	Marko Pajač	1	0	0	0	0	0	1	0	0
85	MF	(Switzerland)	Valon Behrami	1	1	0	0	0	0	1	1	0
91	MF	(Italy)	Riccardo Saponara	1	0	1	0	0	0	1	0	1
9	FW	(Paraguay)	Antonio Sanabria	2	0	0	0	0	0	2	0	0
11	FW	(Ivory Coast)	Christian Kouamé	1	0	0	0	0	0	1	0	0
19	FW	(North Macedonia)	Goran Pandev	4	1	0	0	0	0	4	1	0
23	FW	(Italy)	Mattia Destro	0	0	0	0	0	0	0	0	0
30	FW	(Italy)	Andrea Favilli	3	0	0	0	0	0	3	0	0
56	FW	(Netherlands)	Denilho Cleonise	2	0	0	0	0	0	2	0	0
99	FW	(Italy)	Andrea Pinamonti	1	0	0	0	0	0	1	0	0
Totals				67	4	3	4	0	0	71	4	3

Last updated: 9 February 2020
