= Senese =

Senese may refer to:

- Senese, an adjective for something of, from, or related to Siena (more commonly Sienese in English)
- Senese, a Southern Tuscan dialect
- Senese (surname), a list of notable people with the surname Senese

== See also ==
- Senesi
