= Senesi =

Senesi is an Italian surname derived from the city of Siena. Notable people with this surname include:

- Marcos Senesi (born 1997), Argentine football player
- Vauro Senesi (born 1955), Italian journalist and satirical cartoonist
- Yuri Senesi (born 1997), Italian football player

== See also ==
- Senese
