= Alexandre Pimenta =

Portuguese footballer

Personal information
- Full name: Alexandre Miguel Flora Pimenta
- Date of birth: 2 March 1999 (age 27)
- Place of birth: Coimbra, Portugal
- Height: 1.84 m (6 ft 0 in)
- Position: Forward

Team information
- Current team: Leixões U23

Youth career
- 2007–2011: AEF João Moutinho
- 2011–2013: Sporting
- 2013–2016: Portimonense
- 2016–2019: Venezia

Senior career*
Years	Team	Apps	(Gls)
2019–2021	Venezia	4	(0)
2020–2021	→ Pedras Rubras (loan)	4	(0)
2021–	Leixões U23	17	(0)
- * Club domestic league appearances and goals as of 13 March 2022

Alexandre Miguel Flora Pimenta (born 2 March 1999) is a Portuguese footballer who plays as a forward for Leixões U23.

== Club career ==
He joined the youth squad of Venezia in the summer of 2016.

He made his Serie B debut for Venezia on 4 May 2019 in a game against Pescara, as a 25th-minute substitute for Francesco Di Mariano.

Before the 2021–22 season, Pimenta joined Leixões, where he was assigned to the Under-23 squad that plays in the national Under-23 championship, Liga Revelação.

== Personal life ==
He was at the airport during the 2016 Brussels bombings, but escaped unharmed.
