= Biagio Meccariello =

Italian footballer (born 1991)

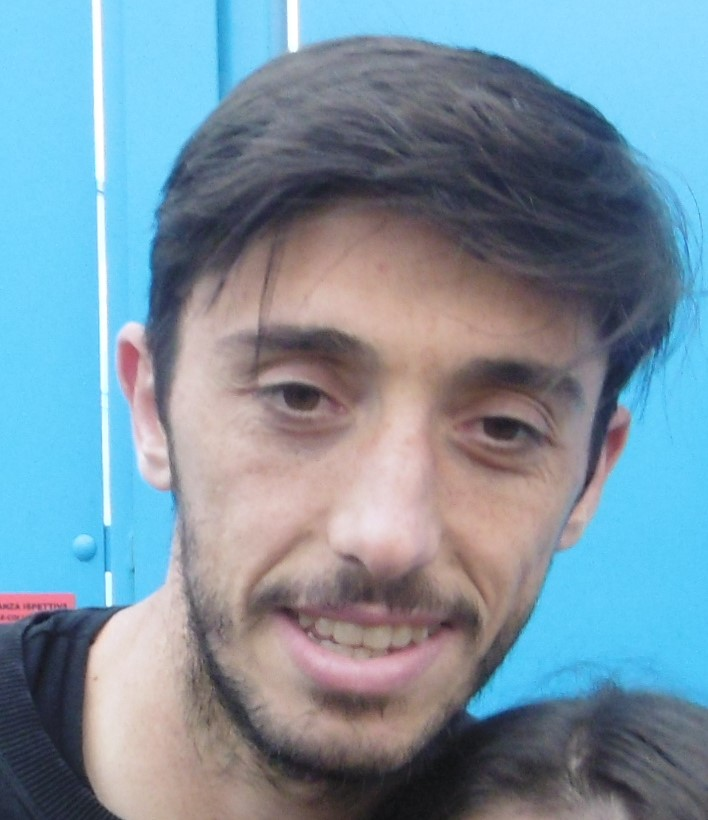
- Photo of Biagio Meccariello

Personal information
- Date of birth: 27 March 1991 (age 35)
- Place of birth: Benevento, Italy
- Height: 1.88 m (6 ft 2 in)
- Position: Centre back

Senior career*
Years	Team	Apps	(Gls)
2009–2011	Viribus Unitis	26	(2)
2011–2012	Andria	26	(2)
2012–2017	Ternana	125	(5)
2017–2019	Brescia	22	(0)
2018–2019	→ Lecce (loan)	33	(0)
2019–2022	Lecce	54	(2)
2022–2023	SPAL	50	(2)
2023–2025	Benevento	4	(0)
2025–2026	Ternana	16	(0)

International career
2011–2012	Italy U20 Lega Pro	1	(0)
- * Club domestic league appearances and goals as of 30 April 2026

Biagio Meccariello (born 27 March 1991) is an Italian professional footballer.

== Biography ==
Meccariello started his senior career with Serie D (amateur/non-professional) club Viribus Unitis. He was selected to national under-18 amateur team in April 2010. On 6 July 2011, Meccariello was signed by Lega Pro Prima Divisione club A.S. Andria BAT along with Angelo Tartaglia. (Italian third highest level). That season he was selected twice to the representative team of Lega Pro (ex- Serie C), against Palestine Olympic (no line-up) and England C.

On 8 August 2012, Meccariello was sold to Serie B newcomers Ternana. He wore no.19 for his new team.

On 17 August 2018, he joined Serie B club Lecce on a season-long loan with a buyout option. Lecce activated the buyout option at the end of the season.

On 6 January 2022, he signed a 2.5-year contract with SPAL in Serie B.

On 1 August 2023, Meccariello moved to Benevento.
