= Senese (surname) =

Senese is an Italian surname derived from the city of Siena. Notable people with this surname include:

- James Senese (1945–2025), Italian saxophonist, composer and singer-songwriter
- Joy Philbin (née Senese; born 1941), American television personality
- Mike Senese (born 1975), American television host
- Richard Senese, American psychologist, academic administrator, and politician

== See also ==
- Senesi
