= Filippo Falco =

Italian professional footballer

Personal information
- Date of birth: 11 February 1992 (age 34)
- Place of birth: Pulsano, Italy
- Height: 1.71 m (5 ft 7 in)
- Positions: Forward; attacking midfielder

Youth career
- 2004–2008: Bari
- 2009–2011: Lecce

Senior career*
Years	Team	Apps	(Gls)
2010–2016	Lecce	27	(2)
2011–2012	→ Pavia (loan)	29	(8)
2013–2014	→ Reggina (loan)	3	(0)
2014	→ Juve Stabia (loan)	11	(1)
2014–2015	→ Trapani (loan)	34	(2)
2015–2016	→ Bologna (loan)	9	(0)
2016–2018	Bologna	0	(0)
2016	→ Cesena (loan)	12	(4)
2016–2017	→ Benevento (loan)	31	(6)
2017–2018	→ Perugia (loan)	8	(1)
2018	→ Pescara (loan)	8	(0)
2018–2021	Lecce	71	(13)
2021–2024	Red Star Belgrade	26	(4)
2022–2023	→ Cagliari (loan)	14	(0)
2024	CFR Cluj	0	(0)
2024–2025	Carrarese	1	(0)
2025	Campobasso	10	(0)

International career
2012	Italy U20	1	(0)
- * Club domestic league appearances and goals as of 27 April 2025

Filippo Falco (born 11 February 1992) is an Italian professional footballer who plays as a forward or midfielder.

He is nicknamed the "Messi from Salento".

== Club career ==
=== Lecce ===
Born in Pulsano, Apulia, Falco started his career at A.S. Bari. In 2008 Falco was released. Falco then left for another Apulia team Lecce. He was the member of the reserve in 2009–10 and 2010–11 season. On 24 November 2010, Falco made his professional debut as a substitute replacing Ignacio Piatti in the 85th minute of a 2–1 away defeat against Udinese in the fourth round of Coppa Italia.

==== Loan to Pavia ====
On 11 August 2011, Falco was signed by Serie C side Pavia along with Fabio Romeo on a season-long loan deal. On 4 September, Falco made his debut for Pavia in a 1–1 home draw against Reggiana, he was replaced by Federico Bufalino in the 77th minute. On 11 September he played his first entire match for Pavia and he scored his first professional goal in the 66th minute of a 2–2 away draw against Sorrento. On 20 November he scored his second goal in the 7th minute of a 2–1 home defeat against Benevento. On 11 December, Falco scored his third goal in the 18th minute of a 1–1 away draw against Tritium. The team finished 16th and forced to play in relegation "play-out" against SPAL. Falco started both playoffs matches but did not score. Falco was the joint-topscorer of the team along with Mattia Marchi. Falco ended his loan to Pavia with 31 appearances, including 30 as a starter and 8 goals.

==== Return to Lecce ====
Falco played his first match of the season on 12 August 2012, as a substitute replacing Ledian Memushaj in the 63rd minute of a 3–1 home win over Chieti in the second round of Coppa Italia. On 18 August he played in a 4–2 away defeat against Torino in Coppa Italia, he was replaced by Inàcio Pià in the 68th minute. On 2 September, Falco made his Serie C debut for Lecce in a 3–2 home win over Cremonese, he was replaced by Cosimo Chiricò in the 55th minute. On 30 September, Falco scored his first goal for Lecce in the 47th minute of a 2–0 home win over Tritium. On 14 October he scored his second goal in the 75th minute of a 4–2 home win over Virtus Entella. On 22 December he played his first entire match of the season, a 0–0 home draw against AlbinoLeffe. Lecce finished 2nd in Serie C and the team played in the play-off, but they were defeat by Carpi in the final (2–1 on aggregate). Falco ended his first season to Lecce with 31 appearances, 2 goals and 1 assist.

==== Loan to Reggina and Juve Stabia ====
On 2 September 2013, Falco was loaned to Serie B club Reggina on a season-long loan deal. On 25 October he made his debut in Serie B for Reggina, as a substitute replacing Alessandro Sbaffo in the 57th minute of a 3–2 home defeat against Pescara. On 1 November, Falco played his first match as a starter for Reggina, a 1–0 away defeat against Latina, he was replaced by David Di Michele in the 53rd minute. On 13 December he played his third match for Reggina as a substitute replacing Jacopo Dall'Oglio in the 52nd minute of a 2–0 home defeat against Robur Siena. In January 2014, Falco was re-called to Lecce leaving Reggina with only 3 appearances.

On 20 January 2014, Falco was signed by Serie B side Juve Stabia on a six-month loan deal. On 25 January he made his Serie B debut for Juve Stabia in a 2–1 home win over Pescara, he played the entire match. On 1 February he scored his first goal for Juve Stabia in the 14th minute of a 1–1 away draw against Spezia. Falco ended his six-month loan with 11 appearances, 1 goal and 2 assists.

==== Loan to Trapani ====
On 11 July 2014, Falco was signed by Serie B club Trapani on a season-long loan deal. On 17 August he made his debut for Trapani as a substitute replacing Simone Basso in the 63rd minute of a 2–1 home defeat against Cremonese in the second round of Coppa Italia. On 30 August he made his Serie B debut for Trapani as a substitute replacing Simone Basso in the 91st minute of a 0–0 away draw against Pescara. On 7 September, Falco played his first match as a starter for Trapani, a 2–1 home win over Vicenza, he was replaced by Mattia Aramu in the 85th minute. On 23 September he played his first entire match for Trapani, a 2–2 home draw against Virtus Entella. On 20 December he scored his first goal for Trapani in the 17th minute of a 2–1 away defeat against Modena. On 2 April he scored his second goal in the 7th minute of a 3–1 home win over Frosinone. Falco ended his loan to Trapani with 34 appearances, 2 goals and 12 assists.

=== Bologna ===
On 18 August 2015, Falco was signed by Bologna on a temporary deal with an obligation to buy. On 29 August he made his Serie A debut in a 1–0 home defeat against Sassuolo, he played the entire match.

==== Loan to Cesena ====
After 9 appearances in Serie A (1 as a starter and 8 as a substitute), on 1 February 2016, Falco was loaned to Serie B club Cesena on a six-month loan deal. On 7 February he made his debut in Serie B as a substitute replacing Camillo Ciano in the 74th minute of a 0–0 away draw against Modena. On 13 February, Falco scored his first goal for Cesena, as a substitute, in the 78th minute of a 2–1 home win over Perugia. On 26 February, Falco played his first match as a starter for Cesena, a 2–0 home win over Cagliari. On 2 May he scored his second goal in the 70th minute of a 2–1 home win over Pro Vercelli. On 7 May he played his first entire match for Cesena, a 1–1 away draw against Ternana. On 20 May he scored twice in a 2–1 away win over Avellino. Falco ended his six-month loan deal to Cesena with 13 appearances, 4 goals and 1 assist.

==== Loan to Benevento ====
On 13 July 2016, Falco joined Benevento on a season-long loan deal. On 7 August he made his debut for Benevento as a substitute replacing Amato Ciciretti in the 87th minute of a match loss 4–2 at penalties after a 0–0 home draw against Salernitana. On 27 August, Falco made his Serie B debut for Benevento in a 2–0 home win over SPAL, he was replaced by Ricardo Bagadur in the 83rd minute. On 4 September he played his first entire match for Benevento and he scored his first goal in the 70th minute of a 1–1 away draw against Carpi. On 10 September he scored his second goal in the 38th minute of a 2–0 home win over Hellas Verona. On 19 November he scored his third goal in the 78th minute of a 4–0 home win over Brescia. He helped Benevento to win promotion to Serie A and ended his loan to Benevento with 36 appearances, 6 goals and 6 assists.

==== Loan to Perugia and Pescara ====
On 29 August 2017, Falco was loaned to Serie B side Perugia on a six-month loan deal. On 3 September he made his Serie B debut as a substitute replacing Han Kwang-song in the 65th minute of a 4–2 home win over Pescara. On 8 October, Falco played his first match as a starter for Perugia, a 5–1 home defeat against Pro Vercelli, he was replaced by Giavanni Terrani in the 75th minute. On 30 November he played in the fourth round of Coppa Italia, an 8–3 away defeat against Udinese, he played the entire match. On 4 December he scored his first goal for Perugia, as a substitute, in the 91st minute of a 1–0 home win over Ascoli. Falco ended his loan to Perugia with 9 appearances, 1 goal and 1 assist.

On 19 January, Falco was signed by Serie B club Pescara on a six-month loan. On 24 February, Falco made his Serie B debut for Pescara in a 0–0 home draw against Cremonese, he was replaced by Leonardo Mancuso in the 75th minute. On 3 March he played his first entire match for Pescara, a 2–0 away defeat against Cittadella. Falco ended his loan to Pescara with 8 appearances.

=== Return to Lecce ===
On 4 July 2018, he was signed by his former club Lecce on a permanent basis. His Serie B debut with the giallorossi side came on 27 August, when he scored a goal against his former team Benevento.

On 3 November 2019, he scored his first Serie A goal against Sassuolo at Stadio Via del Mare with a free-kick.

=== Red Star Belgrade ===
On 29 January 2021, Falco signed with Serbian team Red Star Belgrade.

==== Loan to Cagliari ====
On 1 September 2022, he signed a contract on loan with Cagliari from Red Star Belgrade for the season 2022-23, with the obligation to redeem from Cagliari bounded with the occurrence of certain conditions.

== International career ==
Falco played his first game for the Italy national under-20 football team on 18 April 2012.

== Career statistics ==
=== Club ===
As of match played 27 April 2025

Appearances and goals by club, season and competition
Club	Season	League			Cup		Europe		Other		Total	
Club	Season	Division	Apps	Goals	Apps	Goals	Apps	Goals	Apps	Goals	Apps	Goals
Lecce	2010–11	Lega Pro Prima Divisione	0	0	1	0	—		—		1	0
Pavia (loan)	2011–12	Lega Pro Prima Divisione	29	8	3	1	—		2 (Note: Appearances in Lega Pro Prima Divisione play-out)	0	34	9
Lecce	2012–13	Lega Pro Prima Divisione	27	2	3 (Note: Two appearances in Coppa Italia, one appearance and one goal in Coppa Italia Lega Pro)	1	—		2 (Note: Appearances in Lega Pro Prima Divisione play-offs)	0	32	3
Reggina (loan)	2013–14	Serie B	3	0	0	0	—		—		3	0
Juve Stabia (loan)	2013–14	Serie B	11	1	—		—		—		11	1
Trapani (loan)	2014–15	Serie B	34	2	1	0	—		—		35	2
Bologna (loan)	2015–16	Serie A	9	0	0	0	—		—		9	0
Cesena (loan)	2015–16	Serie B	12	4	—		—		1 (Note: Appearances in Serie B play-offs)	0	13	4
Benevento (loan)	2016–17	Serie B	31	6	1	0	—		4 (Note: Appearances in Serie B play-offs)	0	36	6
Perugia (loan)	2017–18	Serie B	8	1	1	0	—		—		9	1
Pescara (loan)	2017–18	Serie B	8	0	—		—		—		8	0
Lecce	2018–19	Serie B	31	7	2	0	—		—		33	7
Lecce	2019–20	Serie A	30	4	1	1	—		—		31	5
Lecce	2020–21	Serie A	10	2	1	0	—		—		11	2
Lecce	Total		71	13	4	1	—		—		75	14
Red Star Belgrade	2020–21	Serbian SuperLiga	7	3	1	1	2	0	—		10	4
Red Star Belgrade	2021–22	Serbian SuperLiga	19	1	1	0	6	1	—		26	2
Red Star Belgrade	Total		26	4	2	1	8	1	—		36	6
Cagliari (loan)	2022–23	Serie B	14	0	0	0	—		—		14	0
CFR Cluj	2023–24	Liga I	0	0	0	0	—		—		0	0
Carrarese	2024–25	Serie B	1	0	0	0	—		—		1	0
Campobasso	2024–25	Serie C	10	0	—		—		—		10	0
Career total			294	41	16	4	8	1	9	0	327	46

== Honours ==
Red Star Belgrade

- Serbian SuperLiga: 2020–21, 2021–22
- Serbian Cup: 2020–21, 2021–22
