= Andrea Tabanelli (footballer) =

Italian footballer (born 1990)

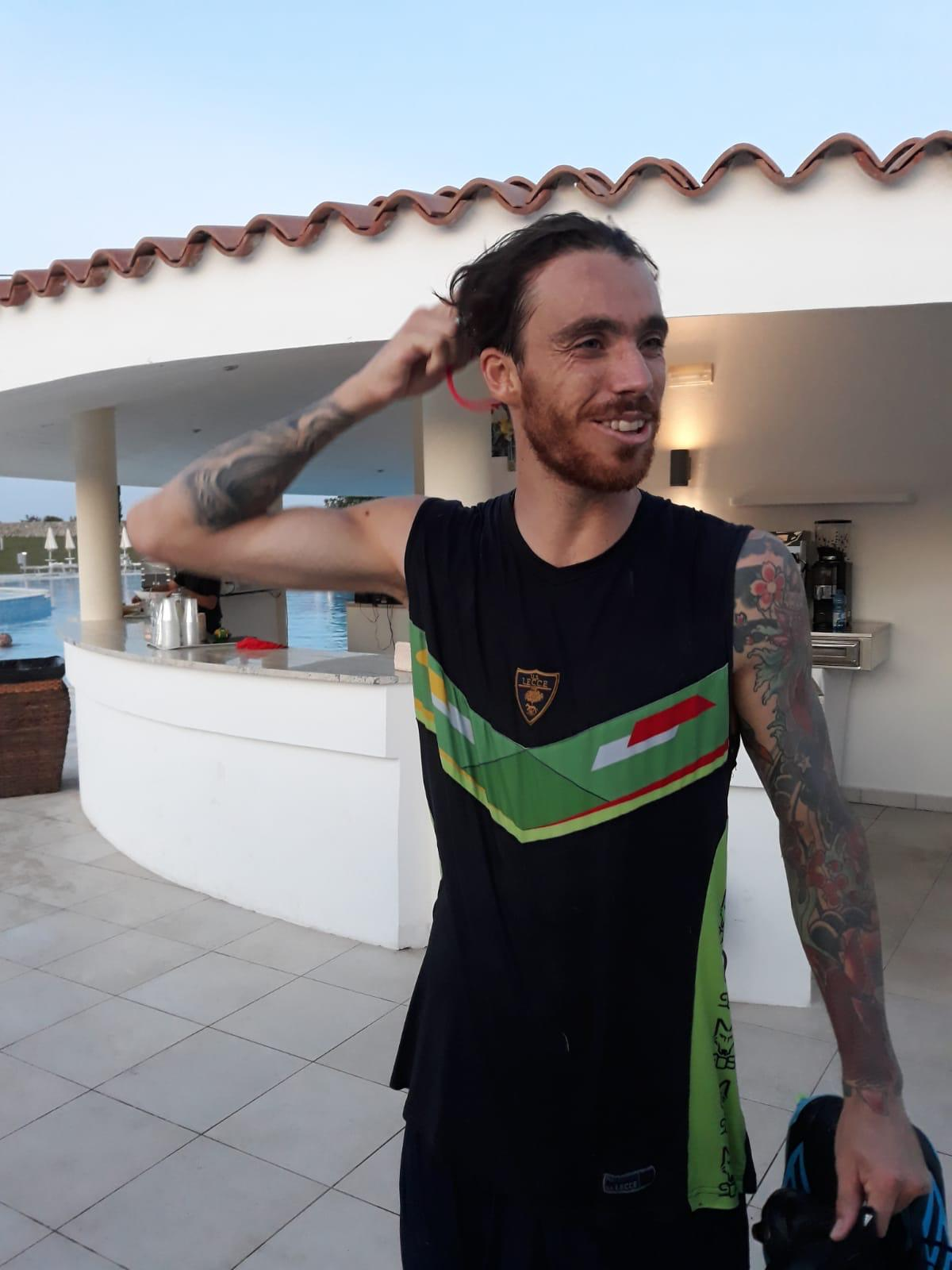

Personal information
- Full name: Andrea Tabanelli
- Date of birth: 2 February 1990 (age 36)
- Place of birth: Ravenna, Italy
- Height: 1.93 m (6 ft 4 in)
- Position: Midfielder

Youth career
- –2010: Cesena

Senior career*
Years	Team	Apps	(Gls)
2010–2017	Cesena	58	(1)
2010–2011	→ Bellaria Igea Marina (loan)	27	(2)
2011–2012	→ Giacomense (loan)	26	(3)
2014	→ Cagliari (loan)	3	(0)
2016	→ Pisa (loan)	13	(1)
2016–2017	→ Pisa (loan)	6	(1)
2017–2018	Padova	6	(1)
2018–2020	Lecce	52	(9)
2020–2022	Frosinone	17	(1)
2021	→ Pescara (loan)	5	(0)
2022–2023	Ravenna	19	(3)
2023–2024	Polisportiva Reno		
- * Club domestic league appearances and goals as of 5 October 2025

Andrea Tabanelli (born 2 February 1990) is an Italian professional footballer who plays as a midfielder. He can also play as a right winger.

== Playing career ==
=== Cesena ===
Tabanelli was born in Ravenna in 1990. He joined Cesena and after loan spells at Bellaria Igea Marina and Giacomense, he became a regular for Cesena. On 1 November 2013, Tabanelli scored his first goal for Cesena against Ternana in a 1–1 draw. He celebrated the goal by pulling out his shin pad and pretending to use it as a mobile phone. On 16 November 2013, Tabanelli signed an extended contract with Cesena until 2017.

==== Cagliari loan ====
After impressing during the first half of the 2013/14 season for Cesena, Tabanelli signed on loan for Serie A Side Cagliari on 27 January 2014 with the option of a permanent move.

Tabanelli made his debut for Cagliari as a second-half substitute on 12 April 2014 in a 1–1 draw against Sassuolo. His first start for Cagliari came on 11 May 2014, when he started in central midfield in the 1–0 defeat against Chievo.

==== Proposed Leeds United loan ====
Days after signing for Cagliari, Tabenelli was signed by Leeds United on loan on January transfer deadline day by prospective Leeds owner Massimo Cellino, the move coming hours after the alleged sacking of manager Brian McDermott. Tabanelli was able to be loaned by Cagliari to Leeds because 'international loans' are recognized as normal transfers allowing players to be loaned stretching from transfer window to transfer window.

After being reinstated as Leeds manager, McDermott revealed that on 3 February that Gianluca Festa was still present in training, this time acting as a translator for new signing Tabanelli. Tabanelli was signed between McDermott's 'sacking' and his reinstatement as manager. McDermott revealed that the move was under scrutiny by the Football League as to whether Tabanelli's signing would be sanctioned.

On 7 February 2014, it was revealed that Tabanelli's transfer to Leeds had been cancelled as the signing 'did not comply with Football League regulations' and he returned to Cagliari.

=== Frosinone ===
On 15 January 2020, he signed with Frosinone in Serie B.

==== Loan to Pescara ====
On 1 February 2021, Tabanelli moved to Serie B club Pescara, on a loan deal.
