= Jacopo Petriccione =

Italian footballer

Personal information
- Date of birth: 22 February 1995 (age 31)
- Place of birth: Gorizia, Italy
- Height: 1.86 m (6 ft 1 in)
- Position: Midfielder

Team information
- Current team: Catanzaro
- Number: 10

Youth career
- Virtus Corno
- –2012: Cagliari
- 2012–2013: Siena
- 2013–2015: Fiorentina

Senior career*
Years	Team	Apps	(Gls)
2015–2017	Fiorentina	0	(0)
2015–2016	→ Pistoiese (loan)	27	(2)
2016–2017	→ Ternana (loan)	36	(1)
2017–2018	Bari	20	(1)
2018–2020	Lecce	65	(2)
2020–2024	Crotone	76	(2)
2021–2022	→ Pordenone (loan)	12	(0)
2022	→ Benevento (loan)	12	(0)
2024–	Catanzaro	77	(2)

International career
2014	Italy U-19	1	(0)
- * Club domestic league appearances and goals as of 10 May 2026

Jacopo Petriccione (born 22 February 1995) is an Italian professional footballer who plays as a midfielder for Serie B club Catanzaro.

== Club career ==
He made his professional debut in the Lega Pro for Pistoiese on 13 September 2015 in a game against Siena.

On 18 January 2022, he joined Benevento in Serie B on loan.

On 25 January 2024, Petriccione signed a two-and-a-half-year contract with Catanzaro.
