= Yuri Senesi =

Italian footballer

Personal information
- Date of birth: 26 January 1997 (age 29)
- Place of birth: Genzano di Roma, Italy
- Height: 1.83 m (6 ft 0 in)
- Position: Forward

Team information
- Current team: Ostia Mare
- Number: 10

Youth career
- –2015: Cynthia

Senior career*
Years	Team	Apps	(Gls)
2015–2016	Cynthia	34	(2)
2016–2019	Olbia	52	(5)
2019–2021	Venezia	4	(0)
2020–2021	→ Cavese (loan)	27	(2)
2021–2022	Vibonese	16	(0)
2022	Picerno	9	(1)
2022–2023	Lupa Frascati	31	(7)
2023–2024	Avezzano	31	(8)
2024–	Ostia Mare	12	(2)
- * Club domestic league appearances and goals as of 17 November 2024

Yuri Senesi (born 26 January 1997) is an Italian football player who plays as a forward for Serie D club Ostia Mare.

== Club career ==
=== Cynthia ===
On 13 September 2015, Senesi made his Serie D debut, for Cynthia, as a substitute replacing Doriano Facondini in the 46th minute of a 0–0 home draw against Budoni, 3 days later he played his first entire match for Cynthia, a 2–1 away defeat against Torres. On 29 November he scored twice in a 3–0 away win over Astrea. Senesi ended his season with 34 appearances, 2 goals and 1 assist.

=== Olbia ===
On 4 August 2016, Senesi was signed by Serie C side Olbia on an undisclosed fee. On 27 August he made his professional debut in Serie C, for Olbia, as a substitute replacing Mattia Muroni in the 79th minute of a 2–1 away defeat against Renate. On 18 September, Senesi played his first match as a starter for Olbia, a 1–0 away defeat against Lupa Roma, he was replaced by Daniele Ragatzu in the 66th minute. On 24 September 2017 he scored his first professional goal, as a substitute, in the 85th minute of a 2–0 home win over Pontedera. On 7 April 2018 he scored twice in a 4–2 home win over Livorno.

=== Venezia ===
On 10 July 2019, he signed a 2-year contract with two additional one-year options with Venezia.

On 5 October 2020 he joined Serie C club Cavese on loan.

=== Serie C ===
On 5 August 2021, he signed with Vibonese in Serie C. On 13 January 2022, he moved to Picerno.

== Career statistics ==
=== Club ===
As of 16 June 2018

Club	Season	League			Cup		Europe		Other		Total	
Club	Season	League	Apps	Goals	Apps	Goals	Apps	Goals	Apps	Goals	Apps	Goals
Cynthia	2015–16	Serie D	34	2	0	0	—		—		24	2
Olbia	2016–17	Serie C	15	0	0	0	—		—		15	0
Olbia	2017–18	Serie C	23	4	0	0	—		—		23	1
Career total			72	6	0	0	—		—		72	6
