= Davide Riccardi =

Italian footballer (born 1996)

Personal information
- Date of birth: 9 April 1996 (age 30)
- Place of birth: Monfalcone, Italy
- Height: 1.76 m (5 ft 9 in)
- Position: Centre back

Team information
- Current team: Perugia
- Number: 28

Youth career
- –2015: Udinese
- 2015–2016: Hellas Verona

Senior career*
Years	Team	Apps	(Gls)
2016–2018	Hellas Verona	0	(0)
2017	→ Südtirol (loan)	9	(0)
2017–2018	→ Lecce (loan)	14	(2)
2018–2021	Lecce	3	(0)
2020	→ Venezia (loan)	7	(0)
2020–2021	→ Catanzaro (loan)	20	(1)
2021–2022	Triestina	0	(0)
2021–2022	→ Taranto (loan)	30	(0)
2022–2023	Siena	26	(2)
2023–2024	Foggia	25	(1)
2024–2025	Novara	10	(0)
2025–	Perugia	40	(2)
- * Club domestic league appearances and goals as of 30 April 2026

Davide Riccardi (born 9 April 1996) is an Italian football player who plays for Serie C Group B club Perugia.

== Club career ==
=== Hellas Verona ===
==== Loan to Südtirol ====
After 6 matches as an un-used substitute in Serie B for Hellas Verona, on 17 January 2017, Riccardi was loaned to Serie C club Südtirol on a 6-month loan deal. On 12 March he made his Serie C debut for Südtirol in a 1–0 home win over Pordenone, he played the entire match. Riccardi ended his loan with 9 appearances, all as a starter.

==== Loan to Lecce ====
On 18 August 2017, Riccardi was signed by Serie C side Lecce on a season-long loan deal. On 21 October he made his Serie C debut for Lecce in a 1–0 away win over Matera, he played the entire match. On 4 November he scored his first professional goal in the 92nd minute of a 1–1 away draw against Fidelis Andria. On 7 November he scored his second goal in the 87th minute of a 2–1 home win over Casertana. In February 2018, Riccardi suffered an anterior cruciate ligament injury and was expected to be out for the rest of the season. Riccardi ended his loan to Lecce with 14 appearances, 2 goal and winning the Serie C title.

=== Lecce ===
After the loan, on 21 June 2018, Riccardi joined Serie B club Lecce on a permanent basis with an undisclosed fee. He played 2 matches in the 2018–19 Serie B season.

On 3 November 2019 he made his Serie A debut against Sassuolo.

=== Venezia ===
On 29 January 2020 he joined Serie B club Venezia on loan. At the same time he extended his contract for Lecce until 2022.

=== Catanzaro ===
On 30 September 2020, he moved to Serie C club Catanzaro on loan.

=== Triestina ===
On 17 August 2021, he moved to Triestina on permanent basis.

On 31 August 2021, he was loaned to Taranto.

=== Siena ===
On 20 August 2022, Riccardi signed a multi-year contract with Siena.

=== Novara ===
On 23 July 2024, Riccardi moved to Novara on a two-season deal.

== Career statistics ==
=== Club ===
As of 3 November 2019

Club	Season	League			Cup		Europe		Other		Total	
Club	Season	League	Apps	Goals	Apps	Goals	Apps	Goals	Apps	Goals	Apps	Goals
Südtirol (loan)	2016–17	Serie C	9	0	—		—		—		9	0
Lecce	2017–18	Serie C	14	2	3	0	—		—		17	0
Lecce	2018–19	Serie B	2	0	0	0	—		—		2	0
Lecce	2019–20	Serie A	1	0	0	0	—		—		1	0
Lecce	Total		17	2	3	0	—		—		20	0
Career total			26	2	3	0	—		—		29	0

== Honours ==
Lecce

- Serie C: 2017–18
