= 2022–23 FC Crotone season =

113th season in existence of F.C. Crotone

Crotone
2022–23 season
- Chairman: Gianni Vrenna
- Head coach: Franco Lerda (until 13 February); Lamberto Zauli (from 13 February)
- Stadium: Stadio Ezio Scida
- Serie C – Group C: 2nd
- Coppa Italia Serie C: Round of 16
- Top goalscorer: League: Cosimo Chiricò (14); All: Cosimo Chiricò (14)
- Highest home attendance: 6,016 v Catanzaro, Serie C, 13 March 2023
- Lowest home attendance: 660 v Monopoli, Coppa Italia Serie C, 2 November 2022
- Average home league attendance: 4,453
- Biggest win: 3–0 v Virtus Francavilla, Serie C, 18 October 2022
- Biggest defeat: 0–2 v Catanzaro, Serie C, 6 November 2022; 0–2 v Foggia, Serie C, 16 November 2022; 1–3 v Avellino, Serie C, 6 February 2023

The 2022–23 season was F.C. Crotone's first season back in the third division of the Italian football league, the Serie C, and the 113th season in existence.

== Players ==
=== First-team squad ===
As of 31 January 2023

Note: Flags indicate national team as defined under FIFA eligibility rules; some limited exceptions apply. Players may hold more than one non-FIFA nationality.

No.	Pos.	Nation	Player
1	GK	ITA	Andrea Dini
2	DF	FRA	Maxime Giron
3	DF	ITA	Giuseppe Cuomo
5	DF	SRB	Vladimir Golemić
6	DF	ITA	Davide Bove
7	FW	ITA	Eugenio D'Ursi
9	FW	ITA	Guido Gómez
10	MF	ITA	Jacopo Petriccione
11	FW	ITA	Iacopo Cernigoi
12	GK	ITA	Francesco Gattuso
13	MF	ITA	Mattia Vitale
14	DF	ROU	Vasile Mogoș
15	DF	ITA	Federico Papini

No.	Pos.	Nation	Player
18	DF	FRA	Guillaume Gigliotti
19	MF	ITA	Alessio Tribuzzi
21	MF	ITA	Marco Carraro (on loan from Atalanta)
22	GK	ITA	Paolo Branduani
23	DF	ITA	Carlo Crialese (on loan from Pro Vercelli)
24	FW	SLE	Augustus Kargbo
26	DF	ITA	Luca Calapai
27	MF	ITA	Andrea D'Errico (on loan from Bari)
32	FW	ITA	Cosimo Chiricò
36	DF	ITA	Riccardo Spaltro
77	FW	ITA	Orazio Pannitteri
86	MF	NGR	Theophilus Awua (on loan from Pro Vercelli)

==== Out on loan ====
Note: Flags indicate national team as defined under FIFA eligibility rules; some limited exceptions apply. Players may hold more than one non-FIFA nationality.

No.	Pos.	Nation	Player
—	GK	ITA	Francesco D'Alterio (at Sangiuliano until 30 June 2023)
—	GK	ITA	Gian Marco Crespi (at Juventus Next Gen until 30 June 2023)
—	DF	ITA	Giovanni D'Aprile (at Roma U19 until 30 June 2023)
—	DF	ITA	Davide Mondonico (at Ancona until 30 June 2023)
—	DF	ITA	Manuel Nicoletti (at Reggiana until 30 June 2023)
—	DF	ITA	Cosimo Spezzano (at Ravenna until 30 June 2023)
—	DF	LTU	Artemijus Tutyškinas (at ŁKS Łódź until 30 June 2023)
—	MF	ITA	Pasquale Giannotti (at Monopoli until 30 June 2023)
—	MF	CHI	Luis Rojas (at Pro Vercelli until 30 June 2023)

No.	Pos.	Nation	Player
—	MF	ITA	Thomas Schirò (at Turris until 30 June 2023)
—	MF	ITA	Marco Spina (at Gubbio until 30 June 2023)
—	MF	ITA	Mattia Timmoneri (at Paternò until 30 June 2023)
—	FW	ITA	Gabriele Bernardotto (at Carrarese until 30 June 2023)
—	FW	ITA	Giovanni Bruzzaniti (at Lucchese until 30 June 2023)
—	FW	ITA	Luca Gozzo (at Frosinone U19 until 30 June 2023)
—	FW	ITA	Giuseppe Panico (at Lucchese until 30 June 2023)
—	FW	ITA	Marco Tumminello (at Gelbison until 30 June 2023)

== Pre-season and friendlies ==
30 July 2022	Crotone	3–2	Lecce U19	Crotone, Italy
17:30 CEST (UTC+2)	Panico 25'; Cuomo 44'; Chiricò 49'		Burnete 18', 66'	Stadium: Campo Ampollino

7 August 2022	Crotone	4–1	Lamezia Terme	Crotone, Italy
CEST (UTC+2)				Stadium: Campo Ampollino

== Competitions ==
=== Overview ===
Competition	First match	Last match	Starting round	Final position	Record							
Competition	First match	Last match	Starting round	Final position	Pld	W	D	L	GF	GA	GD	Win %
Serie C	4 September 2022	23 April 2023	Matchday 1	2nd	38	23	11	4	55	31	+24	60.53
Coppa Italia Serie C	4 October 2022	16 November 2022	First round	Round of 16	3	1	1	1	5	6	−1	33.33
Total					41	24	12	5	60	37	+23	58.54

Last updated: 23 April 2023
Source: Soccerway

=== Serie C ===
==== League table ====
Pos	Team	Pld	W	D	L	GF	GA	GD	Pts	Qualification
1	Catanzaro (P)	38	30	6	2	102	21	+81	96	Promotion to Serie B. Qualification for the Supercoppa di Serie C
2	Crotone	38	23	11	4	57	31	+26	80	Qualification for the promotion play-offs national phase
3	Pescara	38	19	8	11	58	42	+16	65	Qualification for the promotion play-offs national phase
4	Foggia	38	18	7	13	60	44	+16	61	Qualification for the promotion play-offs group phase
5	Audace Cerignola	38	16	12	10	48	41	+7	60	Qualification for the promotion play-offs group phase

Updated to match(es) played on 16 April 2023. Source: Lega Pro, Soccerway (in English)
Rules for classification: 1) Points; 2) Head-to-head points; 3) Head-to-head goal difference; 4) Goal difference; 5) Goals scored; 6) Lower goals against; 7) Wins; 8) Lower losses; 9) Away wins; 10) Lower home losses.
(P) Promoted

==== Results summary ====
Overall								Home						Away					
Pld	W	D	L	GF	GA	GD	Pts	W	D	L	GF	GA	GD	W	D	L	GF	GA	GD
38	23	11	4	57	31	+26	80	13	5	1	25	8	+17	10	6	3	32	23	+9

Last updated: 23 April 2023.
Source: SofaScore

==== Results by round ====
Round	1	2	3	4	5	6	7	8	9	10	11	12	13	14	15	16	17	18	19	20	21	22	23	24	25	26	27	28	29	30	31	32	33	34	35	36	37	38
Ground	A	H	A	H	A	H	H	A	H	A	H	A	H	A	H	A	A	H	A	H	A	H	A	H	A	A	H	A	H	A	H	A	H	A	H	H	A	H
Result	W	W	W	W	D	W	W	L	W	W	W	L	W	W	W	D	W	D	W	W	W	W	D	D	W	L	D	W	D	D	D	D	W	D	W	L	W	W
Position	4	2	2	2	2	2	2	3	2	2	2	3	3	3	2	2	2	2	2	2	2	2	2	2	2	2	2	2	2	2	2	2	2	2	2	2	2	2
Points	3	6	9	12	13	16	19	19	22	25	28	28	31	34	37	38	41	42	45	48	51	54	55	56	59	59	60	63	64	65	66	67	70	71	74	74	77	80

Updated to match(es) played on 23 April 2023. Source: Soccerway
A = Away; H = Home; W = Win; D = Draw; L = Loss

==== Matches ====
4 September 2022 1	Messina	2–4	Crotone	Messina
20:30 CEST	Versienti (yellow card) 20'; Marino 30'; Konate 66'	Report	Chiricò (penalty missed) 27', 34' (pen.); Kargbo 45+4'; Tribuzzi 47'; Awua 53', (yellow card) 85'	Stadium: Stadio San Filippo; Attendance: 3,064; Referee: Mattia Pascarella

11 September 2022 2	Crotone	2–0	Monopoli	Crotone
17:30 CEST	Golemić 18', 37'; Tribuzzi (yellow card) 28'; Giannotti (yellow card) 78'	Report	Falbo (yellow card) 90+3'	Stadium: Stadio Ezio Scida; Attendance: 4,008; Referee: Mattia Caldera

14 September 2022 3	Pescara	0–1	Crotone	Pescara
21:00 CEST	Kraja (yellow card) 51'; Cuppone (yellow card) 60'; Brosco (yellow card) 69'	Report	Tribuzzi (yellow card) 32'; Gómez (yellow card) 34'; Chiricò 65'; Kargbo (yellow card) 67'	Stadium: Stadio Adriatico; Attendance: 4,182; Referee: Francesco Carrione

18 September 2022 4	Crotone	1–0	Monterosi Tuscia	Crotone
17:30 CEST	Chiricò 40'; Petriccione (yellow card) 56'; Awua (yellow card) 90+3'	Report	Verde (yellow card) 19'; Cancellieri (yellow card) 42'; Tartaglia (yellow card) 90+2'	Stadium: Stadio Ezio Scida; Attendance: 4,320; Referee: Fabio Pirrotta

24 September 2022 5	Potenza	1–1	Crotone	Potenza
20:30 CEST	Schimmenti (yellow card) 77'; Emmausso 87', (yellow card) 89'; Laaribi (yellow card) 90+4'	Report	Giron (yellow card) 2'; Gómez (yellow card) 15', (goal) 30'; Panico (red card) 90+2'	Stadium: Stadio Alfredo Viviani; Attendance: 3,094; Referee: Adalberto Fiero

1 October 2022 6	Crotone	1–0	Juve Stabia	Crotone
17:30 CEST	Petriccione (yellow card) 41'; Gómez 71'	Report	Altobelli (yellow card) 43'; Maselli (yellow card) 49'; Mignanelli (yellow card) 76'; Peluso (yellow card) 86'	Stadium: Stadio Ezio Scida; Attendance: 4,509; Referee: Simone Galipò

8 October 2022 7	Crotone	2–0	Avellino	Crotone
17:30 CEST	Chiricò (penalty missed) 30', 30'; Petriccione (yellow card) 78', (goal) 84'	Report	Casarini (yellow card) 29'; Micovschi (yellow card) 45+3'	Stadium: Stadio Ezio Scida; Attendance: 4,496; Referee: Michele Giordano

15 October 2022 8	Foggia	1–0	Crotone	Foggia
14:30 CEST	Frigerio (yellow card) 12'; Malomo (yellow card) 43'; Vuthaj 51'; Nobile (yellow card) 66'	Report	Cuomo (yellow card) 8'; Tribuzzi (yellow card) 13'	Stadium: Stadio Pino Zaccheria; Attendance: 4,696; Referee: Alessandro Di Graci

18 October 2022 9	Crotone	3–0	Virtus Francavilla	Crotone
21:00 CEST	Golemić (yellow card) 52'; Giannotti (yellow card) 68'; Cuomo 74'; Gómez 79', 86'	Report	Tchetchoua (yellow card) 11'; Pierno (yellow card) 33'; Patierno (yellow card) 48'; Caporale (yellow card) 61'	Stadium: Stadio Ezio Scida; Attendance: 4,412; Referee: Luca Angelucci

23 October 2022 10	Turris	2–4	Crotone	Torre del Greco
17:30 CEST	Maniero 13', 72'; Gallo (yellow card) 47'; Di Nunzio (yellow card) 63'; Boccia (yellow card) 73'	Report	Awua (yellow card) 16'; Kargbo 30'; Gómez 32'; Tribuzzi 51'; Chiricò 80'	Stadium: Stadio Amerigo Liguori; Attendance: 1,398; Referee: Filippo Giaccaglia

30 October 2022 11	Crotone	1–0	Picerno	Crotone
17:30 CET	Cuomo (yellow card) 15' (yellow-red card) 62'; Gómez 37' (pen.)	Report	Diop (yellow card) 24'; Esposito (yellow card) 51'	Stadium: Stadio Ezio Scida; Attendance: 4,656; Referee: Kevin Bonacina

6 November 2022 12	Catanzaro	2–0	Crotone	Catanzaro
14:30 CET	Brighenti (yellow card) 19'; Sounas (yellow card) 23'; Biasci (yellow card) 40'; Iemmello 45'; Ghion (yellow card) 54'; Curcio 68'; Vandeputte (yellow card) 88'	Report	Tribuzzi (yellow card) 24'; Mogoș (yellow card) 53'	Stadium: Stadio Nicola Ceravolo; Attendance: 12,138; Referee: Marco Monaldi

13 November 2022 13	Crotone	2–1	Fidelis Andria	Crotone
17:30 CET	Tribuzzi (yellow card) 31'; Panico (yellow card) 45+1'; Pannitteri 58'; Chiricò (yellow card) 70'; Vitale (yellow card) 71'; Gómez 74' (pen.)	Report	Bolsius 13'; Candellori (yellow card) 72'; Orfei (yellow card) 87'	Stadium: Stadio Ezio Scida; Attendance: 4,265; Referee: Michele Delrio

20 November 2022 14	Viterbese	1–3	Crotone	Viterbo
14:30 CET	Volpicelli (yellow card) 20'; Andreis (yellow card) 34'; Marotta 35'; Monteagudo (yellow card) 45+1'; Riggio (yellow card) 90'; Pavlev (yellow card) 90+2'	Report	Pannitteri 6'; Chiricò 46', 88', (yellow card) 90+2'; Bove (yellow card) 54'; Calapai (yellow card) 84'	Stadium: Stadio Enrico Rocchi; Attendance: 1,099; Referee: Marco Emmanuele

27 November 2022 15	Crotone	1–0	Latina	Crotone
14:30 CET	Petriccione (yellow card) 32'; Cuomo (yellow card) 60'; Mogoș 79'; Tumminello (yellow card) 85'	Report	Margiotta (yellow card) 20'; Cortinovis (yellow card) 57' (yellow-red card) 69'; Bordin (yellow card) 87'	Stadium: Stadio Ezio Scida; Referee: Mattia Pascarella

30 November 2022 16	Taranto	2–2	Crotone	Taranto
18:00 CET	Antonini 5'; Ferrara (yellow card) 30'; Formiconi (yellow card) 45+1'; Tommasini 45+3'; Vona (yellow card) 50'; Manetta (yellow card) 73'; Vannucchi (yellow card) 86'	Report	Chiricò 22'; Petriccione (yellow card) 49'; Mogoș 54'; Tribuzzi (yellow card) 78'	Stadium: Stadio Erasmo Iacovone; Attendance: 403; Referee: Stefano Nicolini

4 December 2022 17	Audace Cerignola	0–1	Crotone	Cerignola
17:30 CET	Tascone (yellow card) 60'	Report	Mogoș (yellow card) 59'; Awua (yellow card) 60', (goal) 72'; Golemić (yellow card) 62'; Rojas (yellow card) 71'	Stadium: Stadio Domenico Monterisi; Attendance: 1,707; Referee: Mario Saia

11 December 2022 18	Crotone	1–1	Gelbison	Crotone
17:30 CET	Mogoș (yellow card) 43'; Chiricò 71'	Report	Cargnelutti (yellow card) 15' (yellow-red card) 77'; Fornito 52'; D'Agostino (yellow card) 75'	Stadium: Stadio Ezio Scida; Attendance: 4,226; Referee: Mattia Caldera

18 December 2022 19	Giugliano	2–3	Crotone	Giugliano in Campania
12:30 CET	Rondinella 6'; Felippe (yellow card) 30'; Biasiol (yellow card) 45'; Salvemini 48'	Report	Gómez 17' (pen.), 61', 66'; Petriccione (yellow card) 55'; Tribuzzi (yellow card) 76'	Stadium: Stadio Alberto De Cristofaro; Attendance: 300; Referee: Claudio Panettella

23 December 2022 20	Crotone	1–0	Messina	Crotone
14:30 CET	Petriccione 62'; Golemić (yellow card) 72'	Report		Stadium: Stadio Ezio Scida; Attendance: 4,710; Referee: Mattia Ubaldi

7 January 2023 21	Monopoli	1–2	Crotone	Monopoli
17:30 CET	Manzari (yellow card) 32'; Rolando (yellow card) 71'; Hamlili (yellow card) 72'; Starita 80' (pen.); Fella (yellow card) 90'	Report	Crialese (yellow card) 28'; Vitale 46'; Chiricò 52'	Stadium: Stadio Vito Simone Veneziani; Attendance: 1,613; Referee: Francesco Carrione

16 January 2023 22	Crotone	1–0	Pescara	Crotone
20:30 CET	Cuomo (yellow card) 5'; D'Ursi (yellow card) 51'; Vitale 82', (yellow card) 82'; Papini (yellow card) 87'; Golemić (yellow card) 90+2'	Report	Ingrosso (yellow card) 42'; Kraja (yellow card) 48'; Cancellotti (yellow card) 67'; Crescenzi (yellow card) 78'	Stadium: Stadio Ezio Scida; Attendance: 4,599; Referee: Paride Tremolada

22 January 2023 23	Monterosi Tuscia	1–1	Crotone	Viterbo
14:30 CET	Verde (yellow card) 21'; Tartaglia (yellow card) 79'; Costantino 90+2'	Report	Dini (yellow card) 40'; Chiricò 43'	Stadium: Stadio Enrico Rocchi; Attendance: 180; Referee: Enrico Maggio

29 January 2023 24	Crotone	0–0	Potenza	Crotone
14:30 CET	Golemić (red card) 36'; Bove (yellow card) 76'	Report	Matino (yellow card) 10' (yellow-red card) 47'; Riccardi (yellow card) 24'; Cittadino (yellow card) 54'; Steffè (yellow card) 69'; Rocchi (yellow card) 78'; Hadžiosmanović (yellow card) 90+6'	Stadium: Stadio Ezio Scida; Attendance: 4,130; Referee: Gabriele Scatena

1 February 2023 25	Juve Stabia	1–2	Crotone	Castellammare di Stabia
21:00 CET	Caldore (red card) 8'; Cinaglia (yellow card) 45'; Pandolfi 49'; Mignanelli (yellow card) 51'	Report	Chiricò 11'; Cuomo (yellow card) 52'; Gigliotti (yellow card) 55'; Cernigoi 78'	Stadium: Stadio Romeo Menti; Attendance: 2,000; Referee: Kevin Bonacina

6 February 2023 26	Avellino	3–1	Crotone	Avellino
20:30 CET	Mazzocco 17', (yellow card) 51'; D'Angelo 31'; Tito (yellow card) 32' (yellow-red card) 90+5'; Trotta 71'; Ricciardi (yellow card) 76'	Report	D'Ursi (yellow card) 17'; Gómez 74' (pen.); Chiricò (yellow card) 90+5'	Stadium: Stadio Partenio-Adriano Lombardi; Attendance: 3,000; Referee: Matteo Centi

11 February 2023 27	Crotone	1–1	Foggia	Crotone
17:30 CET	Papini (yellow card) 55'; Golemić (yellow card) 61'; Garattoni 88' (o.g.)	Report	Frigerio 54', (yellow card) 69'; Thiam (yellow card) 64'; Garattoni (yellow card) 65'; Rutjens (yellow card) 87'	Stadium: Stadio Ezio Scida; Attendance: 4,152; Referee: Simone Galipo

19 February 2023 28	Virtus Francavilla	1–2	Crotone	Francavilla Fontana
14:30 CET	De Marino (yellow card) 18'; Cisco (yellow card) 29', (goal) 66'; Idda (yellow card) 53'; Tchetchoua (yellow card) 70'; Murilo (yellow card) 82'	Report	D'Ursi (yellow card) 21', (goal) 59'; Gómez (yellow card) 23', (goal) 71' (pen.); Calapai (yellow card) 63'	Stadium: Stadio Giovanni Paolo II; Attendance: 1,300; Referee: Mario Saia

25 February 2023 29	Crotone	0–0	Turris	Crotone
14:30 CET	Gigliotti (yellow card) 35'	Report	Contessa (yellow card) 55'	Stadium: Stadio Ezio Scida; Attendance: 4,227; Referee: Antonino Costanza

4 March 2023 30	Picerno	1–1	Crotone	Picerno
14:30 CET	Pagliai (yellow card) 52'; Santarcangelo 58'; De Cristofaro (yellow card) 66'	Report	Petriccione (yellow card) 66'; D'Errico 67'; Gigliotti (yellow card) 72'	Stadium: Stadio Donato Curcio; Attendance: 349; Referee: Davide Di Marco

13 March 2023 31	Crotone	1–1	Catanzaro	Crotone
20:30 CET	Mogoș 55', (yellow card) 85'; Vitale (yellow card) 58'; Chiricò (yellow card) 65'	Report	Verna 73'; Brighenti (yellow card) 88'	Stadium: Stadio Ezio Scida; Attendance: 6,016; Referee: Michele Giordano

16 March 2023 32	Fidelis Andria	0–0	Crotone	Andria
21:00 CET		Report	Golemić (yellow card) 43'; Papini (yellow card) 71'	Stadium: Stadio Degli Ulivi; Referee: Andrea Bordin

19 March 2023 33	Crotone	3–2	Viterbese	Crotone
14:30 CET	Tribuzzi (yellow card) 26', (goal) 63'; Cuomo (yellow card) 46'; D'Errico (yellow card) 59', (goal) 84'; Gómez 77'	Report	Semenzato 18'; Barillà 47' (pen.); Marenco (yellow card) 55'; Mastropietro (yellow card) 75'; Riggio (yellow card) 90+5'	Stadium: Stadio Ezio Scida; Attendance: 3,952; Referee: Gianluca Grasso

25 March 2023 34	Latina	2–2	Crotone	Latina
17:30 CEST	Pellegrino (yellow card) 17'; Calabrese (yellow card) 39'; Riccardi 63'; Golemić 69' (o.g.)	Report	Petriccione (yellow card) 34'; Vitale 51'; Carraro 66'	Stadium: Stadio Domenico Francioni; Attendance: 1,247; Referee: Enrico Gemelli

2 April 2023 35	Crotone	1–0	Taranto	Crotone
17:30 CEST	Crialese 5'; Bove (yellow card) 57'	Report	Sciacca (yellow card) 57'; Mazza (yellow card) 61'; Rossetti (yellow card) 87'	Stadium: Stadio Ezio Scida; Attendance: 5,064; Referee: Valerio Pezzopane

8 April 2023 36	Crotone	0–1	Audace Cerignola	Crotone
17:30 CEST	Petriccione (yellow card) 17'; Carraro (yellow card) 78'; Kargbo (yellow card) 90+3'; Bove (yellow card) 90+3'	Report	Saracco (yellow card) 71'; D'Ausilio 82'	Stadium: Stadio Ezio Scida; Attendance: 4,192; Referee: Leonardo Mastrodomenico

16 April 2023 37	Gelbison	0–2	Crotone	Vallo della Lucania
17:30 CEST	Granata (yellow card) 50'; Gilli (yellow card) 57'; Tumminello (yellow card) 70'; Infantino (yellow card) 78'	Report	Granata 15' (o.g.); Chiricò 32'; Kargbo (yellow card) 62'; Carraro (yellow card) 63'; Golemić (yellow card) 67'; Vitale (yellow card) 79'	Stadium: Stadio Giovanni Morra; Attendance: 500; Referee: Enrico Maggio

23 April 2023 38	Crotone	3–1	Giugliano	Crotone
17:30 CEST	D'Errico 2'; Cernigoi 26'; Chiricò 57'; Carraro (yellow card) 69'; Branduani (yellow card) 81'	Report	Rizzo 55'	Stadium: Stadio Ezio Scida; Attendance: 4,216; Referee: Edoardo Gianquinto

=== Coppa Italia Serie C ===
4 October 2022 First round	Crotone	2–2 (a.e.t.) (3–1 p)	Messina	Crotone
17:30 CEST	Dini (yellow card) 23'; Giannotti (yellow card) 31'; Rojas 54'; Pannitteri 70'; Vitale (yellow card) 73'; Giron (yellow card) 112'	Report	Ferrini (yellow card) 17'; Berto 29'; Konate 77', (yellow card) 79'; Fiorani (yellow card) 107'	Stadium: Stadio Ezio Scida; Referee: Fabio Rosario Luongo
	Penalties
	Gómez (penalty scored); Giron (penalty scored); Pannitteri (penalty scored)		(penalty missed) Baldé; (penalty missed) Fazzi; (penalty scored) Fiorani; (penalty missed) Fofana

2 November 2022 Second round	Crotone	3–2 (a.e.t.)	Monopoli	Crotone
14:30 CET	Radicchio 10' (o.g.); Panico 34', (yellow card) 45+1'; Giannotti (yellow card) 79'; Giancotti (yellow card) 90+1'; Cantisani 109'	Report	De Santis (yellow card) 32'; Fella 40'; Starita 64'; Rolando (yellow card) 66'; Viteritti (yellow card) 101'; Cristallo (yellow card) 109'	Stadium: Stadio Ezio Scida; Attendance: 660; Referee: Matteo Centi

16 November 2022 Round of 16	Foggia	2–0	Crotone	Foggia
20:30 CET	Schenetti 24'; Di Pasquale (yellow card) 26'; Odjer (yellow card) 39'; Rizzo (yellow card) 48'; Domingos (yellow card) 60'; Chierico (yellow card) 66'; Peschetola 90'	Report	Awua (yellow card) 10'	Stadium: Stadio Pino Zaccheria; Referee: Gianluca Grasso
