= 2020–21 Frosinone Calcio season =

Frosinone
2020–21 season
- Chairman: Maurizio Stirpe
- Manager: Alessandro Nesta (until 22 March); Fabio Grosso (from 23 March)
- Stadium: Stadio Benito Stirpe
- Serie B: 10th
- Coppa Italia: Second round
Home colours	Away colours	Third colours

The 2020–21 season was Frosinone Calcio's third consecutive season in second division of the Italian football league, the Serie B, and the 115th as a football club.

== Players ==
=== First-team squad ===
Note: Flags indicate national team as defined under FIFA eligibility rules; some limited exceptions apply. Players may hold more than one non-FIFA nationality.

No.	Pos.	Nation	Player
1	GK	ITA	Alessandro Iacobucci
2	DF	ITA	Alessandro Salvi
3	DF	ITA	Marco Capuano
4	DF	ARG	Marcos Curado (on loan from Genoa)
5	MF	ITA	Mirko Gori
6	DF	ITA	Riccardo Baroni
7	MF	SWE	Marcus Rohdén
8	MF	ITA	Raffaele Maiello
9	FW	ITA	Vincenzo Millico (on loan from Torino)
10	FW	ITA	Pietro Iemmello
11	MF	ITA	Daniel Boloca
12	GK	ITA	Giuseppe Marcianò
15	DF	ITA	Lorenzo Ariaudo
16	DF	ITA	Salvatore D'Elia

No.	Pos.	Nation	Player
17	MF	ITA	Marco Carraro (on loan from Atalanta)
18	FW	USA	Andrija Novakovich
19	MF	ITA	Alessio Tribuzzi
22	GK	ITA	Francesco Bardi
23	DF	ITA	Nicolò Brighenti (captain)
24	MF	ITA	Mattia Vitale
25	DF	POL	Przemysław Szymiński
28	FW	ITA	Camillo Ciano
30	FW	POL	Piotr Parzyszek
33	DF	ITA	Luigi Vitale
37	MF	CYP	Grigoris Kastanos (on loan from Juventus)
75	GK	ITA	Thomas Vettorel
93	DF	ITA	Francesco Zampano
99	FW	ITA	Enrico Brignola (on loan from Sassuolo)

=== Players out on loan ===
Note: Flags indicate national team as defined under FIFA eligibility rules; some limited exceptions apply. Players may hold more than one non-FIFA nationality.

No.	Pos.	Nation	Player
—	GK	ITA	Paolo Bastianello (at Vis Pesaro)
—	DF	ITA	Mattia Tonetto (at Cesena)
—	DF	SLO	Luka Krajnc (at Fortuna Düsseldorf)
—	DF	ITA	Francesco Verde (at Birkirkara)
—	MF	ITA	Andrea Beghetto (at Pisa, obligation to buy)

No.	Pos.	Nation	Player
—	MF	ITA	Andrea Errico (at Avellino)
—	MF	ITA	Andrea Tabanelli (at Pescara )
—	MF	ITA	Marcello Trotta (at Cosenza)
—	FW	ITA	Matteo Ardemagni (at Reggiana)
—	FW	ITA	Michele Volpe (at Catania)

== Pre-season and friendlies ==
Win Draw Loss

9 September 2020 Friendly	Frosinone (Italy)	1–4	(Italy) Roma	Frosinone, Italy
18:00 CEST (UTC+2)	Dionisi 55'		Karsdorp 14'; Ünder 16'; Pellegrini 37'; Mkhitaryan 45'	Stadium: Stadio Benito Stirpe; Attendance: 0

12 September 2020 Friendly	Frosinone (Italy)	0–1	(Italy) Lazio	Frosinone, Italy
18:00 CEST (UTC+2)		Report	Correa 63'	Stadium: Stadio Benito Stirpe; Attendance: 0 Referee: Claudio Campobasso

== Competitions ==
=== Overall record ===
Competition	First match	Last match	Starting round	Final position	Record							
Competition	First match	Last match	Starting round	Final position	Pld	W	D	L	GF	GA	GD	Win %
Serie B	26 September 2020	10 May 2021	Matchday 1	19th	38	12	14	12	38	42	−4	31.58
Coppa Italia	30 September 2020		Second round	Second round	1	0	0	1	1	3	−2	0.00
Total					39	12	14	13	39	45	−6	30.77

Source: Soccerway

=== Serie B ===
==== League table ====
Pos	Team	Pld	W	D	L	GF	GA	GD	Pts	Promotion, qualification or relegation
8	Chievo (D, R)	38	14	14	10	50	37	+13	56 (Note: Head-to-head points: Brescia 9, Chievo 5, SPAL 2.)	Bankruptcy
9	SPAL	38	14	14	10	44	42	+2	56	
10	Frosinone	38	12	14	12	38	42	−4	50 (Note: Frosinone finished ahead of Reggina on head-to-head points: Frosinone 1–1 Reggina, Reggina 0–4 Frosinone.)	
11	Reggina	38	12	14	12	42	45	−3	50	
12	Vicenza	38	11	15	12	48	53	−5	48 (Note: Head-to-head points: Vicenza 8, Cremonese 4, Pisa 3.)	

Source: Lega Serie B (in Italian), Soccerway (in English)
Rules for classification: 1) Points; 2) Head-to-head points; 3) Head-to-head goal difference; 4) Goal difference; 5) Goals scored; 6) Draw.
(D) Disqualified; (R) Relegated

==== Results summary ====
Overall								Home						Away					
Pld	W	D	L	GF	GA	GD	Pts	W	D	L	GF	GA	GD	W	D	L	GF	GA	GD
38	12	14	12	38	42	−4	50	4	9	6	16	21	−5	8	5	6	22	21	+1

Source: Serie B

==== Results by round ====
Round	1	2	3	4	5	6	7	8	9	10	11	12	13	14	15	16	17	18	19	20	21	22	23	24	25	26	27	28	29	30	31	32	33	34	35	36	37	38
Ground	H	A	H	H	A	H	A	H	A	H	A	A	H	A	H	A	H	A	H	A	H	A	A	H	A	H	A	H	A	H	H	A	H	A	H	A	H	A
Result	L	W	W	D	W	W	L	L	W	W	D	W	D	L	D	D	L	D	D	L	L	D	W	D	L	D	W	L	D	L	D	L	D	L	W	W	D	W
Position	20	7	4	6	4	3	4	7	6	5	5	3	3	5	6	7	8	9	10	10	10	10	10	9	10	10	10	10	11	12	13	14	14	14	14	11	12	10

Source: Serie B
A = Away; H = Home; W = Win; D = Draw; L = Loss

==== Matches ====
The league fixtures were announced on 24 July 2021.

26 September 2020 1	Frosinone	0–2	Empoli	Frosinone
--:-- CEST (UTC+2)				Stadium: Stadio Benito Stirpe

3 October 2020 2	Venezia	0–2	Frosinone
--:-- CEST (UTC+2)

17 October 2020 3	Frosinone	1–0	Ascoli	Frosinone
--:-- CEST (UTC+2)				Stadium: Stadio Benito Stirpe

20 October 2020 4	Frosinone	0–0	Virtus Entella	Frosinone
--:-- CEST (UTC+2)				Stadium: Stadio Benito Stirpe

24 October 2020 5	Pescara	0–2	Frosinone
--:-- CEST (UTC+2)

31 October 2020 6	Frosinone	1–0	Cremonese	Frosinone
--:-- CET (UTC+1)				Stadium: Stadio Benito Stirpe

7 November 2020 7	Monza	2–0	Frosinone
--:-- CET (UTC+1)

20 November 2020 8	Frosinone	0–2	Cosenza	Frosinone
--:-- CET (UTC+1)				Stadium: Stadio Benito Stirpe

28 November 2020 9	Brescia	1–2	Frosinone
--:-- CET (UTC+1)

5 December 2020 10	Frosinone	3–2	Chievo	Frosinone
--:-- CET (UTC+1)				Stadium: Stadio Benito Stirpe

12 December 2020 11	Lecce	2–2	Frosinone
--:-- CET (UTC+1)

15 December 2020 12	Reggiana	1–2	Frosinone
--:-- CET (UTC+1)

18 December 2020 13	Frosinone	0–0	Salernitana	Frosinone
--:-- CET (UTC+1)				Stadium: Stadio Benito Stirpe

22 December 2020 14	Cittadella	1–0	Frosinone
--:-- CET (UTC+1)

27 December 2020 15	Frosinone	1–1	Pordenone	Frosinone
--:-- CET (UTC+1)				Stadium: Stadio Benito Stirpe

4 January 2021 17	Frosinone	1–2	SPAL	Frosinone
--:-- CET (UTC+1)				Stadium: Stadio Benito Stirpe

15 January 2021 18	Vicenza	0–0	Frosinone
--:-- CET (UTC+1)

23 January 2021 19	Frosinone	1–1	Reggina	Frosinone
--:-- CET (UTC+1)				Stadium: Stadio Benito Stirpe

30 January 2021 20	Empoli	3–1	Frosinone
--:-- CET (UTC+1)

2 February 2021 16	Pisa	0–0	Frosinone	Pisa
--:-- CET (UTC+1)

6 February 2021 21	Frosinone	1–2	Venezia	Frosinone
--:-- CET (UTC+1)				Stadium: Stadio Benito Stirpe

9 February 2021 22	Ascoli	1–1	Frosinone
--:-- CET (UTC+1)

14 February 2021 23	Virtus Entella	2–3	Frosinone
--:-- CET (UTC+1)

19 February 2021 24	Frosinone	0–0	Pescara	Frosinone
--:-- CET (UTC+1)				Stadium: Stadio Benito Stirpe

27 February 2021 25	Cremonese	4–0	Frosinone	Cremona
--:-- CET (UTC+1)

2 March 2021 26	Frosinone	2–2	Monza	Frosinone
--:-- CET (UTC+1)				Stadium: Stadio Benito Stirpe

6 March 2021 27	Cosenza	1–2	Frosinone	Cosenza
--:-- CET (UTC+1)

13 March 2021 28	Frosinone	0–1	Brescia	Frosinone
--:-- CET (UTC+1)				Stadium: Stadio Benito Stirpe

16 March 2021 29	Chievo	0–0	Frosinone	Verona
--:-- CET (UTC+1)

20 March 2021 30	Frosinone	0–3	Lecce	Frosinone
--:-- CET (UTC+1)				Stadium: Stadio Benito Stirpe

2 April 2021 31	Frosinone	0–0	Reggiana	Frosinone
--:-- CEST (UTC+2)				Stadium: Stadio Benito Stirpe

5 April 2021 32	Salernitana	1–0	Frosinone	Salerno
--:-- CEST (UTC+2)

10 April 2021 33	Frosinone	1–1	Cittadella	Frosinone
--:-- CEST (UTC+2)				Stadium: Stadio Benito Stirpe

17 April 2021 34	Pordenone	2–0	Frosinone	Pordenone
--:-- CEST (UTC+2)

1 May 2021 35	Frosinone	1–0	Pisa	Frosinone
--:-- CEST (UTC+2)				Stadium: Stadio Benito Stirpe

4 May 2021 36	SPAL	0–1	Frosinone	Ferrara
--:-- CEST (UTC+2)

7 May 2021 37	Frosinone	1–1	Vicenza	Frosinone
--:-- CEST (UTC+2)				Stadium: Stadio Benito Stirpe

10 May 2021 38	Reggina	0–4	Frosinone	Reggio Calabria
--:-- CEST (UTC+2)

=== Coppa Italia ===
30 September 2020 Second round	Frosinone	1–3	Padova	Frosinone
15:00 CEST (UTC+2)	Tabanelli 20'	Report	Della Latta 21', 44'; Soleri 34'	Stadium: Stadio Benito Stirpe; Referee: Giacomo Camplone
