= Calapai =

Calapai is a surname. Notable people with the surname include:

- Letterio Calapai (1902–1993), American artist
- Luca Calapai (born 1993), Italian footballer
