= Garattoni =

Garattoni is a surname. Notable people with the surname include:

- Alessandro Garattoni (born 1998), Italian footballer
- Fabrizio Garattoni, Italian figure skater
