= Granata =

Granata is an Italian word for “grenade”.

== People ==
- Amalia Granata (born 1981), Argentine model and politician
- Antonio Granata (born 1997), Italian football player
- Daniele Granata (born 1991), Italian footballer
- Giovanni Battista Granata (c. 1620–1687), Italian guitarist and composer
- Graziella Granata (born 1941), Italian film and stage actress
- Kevin Granata (1961–2007), American biomedical engineer
- María Granata (1920–2026), Argentine author and poet
- Peter C. Granata (1898–1973), U.S. Representative from Illinois
- Rocco Granata (born 1938), Belgian singer, songwriter, and accordionist

== Other ==
The Russian word Granata can mean either Grenade or Pomegranate.

- Stielhandgranate, a German "stick hand grenade"
- Granata (gastropod), a genus of sea snails in the family Chilodontidae
- I Granata, a nickname of Torino F.C., an Italian professional football club
