= Guido Gómez =

Italian footballer

Personal information
- Date of birth: 19 May 1994 (age 32)
- Place of birth: Vico Equense, Italy
- Height: 1.85 m (6 ft 1 in)
- Position: Forward

Team information
- Current team: Bari
- Number: 9

Youth career
- Sassuolo

Senior career*
Years	Team	Apps	(Gls)
2013–2014	Pro Vercelli	4	(1)
2014	→ Cuneo (loan)	9	(0)
2014–2015	Sassuolo	0	(0)
2014–2015	→ Juve Stabia (loan)	9	(2)
2015–2016	Juve Stabia	27	(2)
2016–2017	Akragas	22	(6)
2017	Catanzaro	14	(0)
2017–2019	Renate	63	(17)
2019–2022	Triestina	85	(25)
2022–2026	Crotone	134	(57)
2026–	Bari	2	(0)

International career
2013–2014	Italy U20	11	(4)
- * Club domestic league appearances and goals as of 28 August 2026

Guido Gómez (born 19 May 1994) is an Italian professional footballer who plays as a forward for Serie C Group C club Bari.

== Club career ==
Born in Vico Equense, in the Province of Naples, in the Region of Campania, Italy, Gómez started his career at Emilian club Sassuolo. In 2013, he was farmed to Pro Vercelli. (in a co-ownership deal for a peppercorn fee of €500) On 16 January 2014 he left for Lega Pro Seconda Divisione (ex–Serie C2) club Cuneo. Pro Vercelli was promoted back to Serie B while Cuneo relegated to Serie D respectively. Gómez made 13 league appearances in the whole season, as well a goal in 3 appearances in the cups. (Coppa Italia and Coppa Italia Lega Pro) in June 2014, Sassuolo bought Gómez back on a two-year contract.

In July 2014, Gómez left for Juve Stabia in a temporary deal, for the first Lega Pro (ex–Serie C) season with only one division since 1978. The club later signed Gómez outright.

In summer 2016, Gómez was sold to Akragas, with Urban Žibert moving to Juve Stabia. On 31 January 2017, Gómez was signed by Catanzaro on a 1 1/2-year contract.

On 29 July 2019, he joined Triestina.

On 27 July 2022, Gómez signed a three-year contract with Crotone.

== International career ==
Gómez scored 4 goals in 5 matches in the 2013 Mediterranean Games for the Italy under-19 team (de facto under-20 team as Italy had been eliminated from the 2013 UEFA European Under-19 Championship).

== Career statistics ==
=== Club ===
As of match played 17 May 2023

Club	Season	League			National Cup		Total	
Club	Season	Division	Apps	Goals	Apps	Goals	Apps	Goals
Pro Vercelli	2013–14	Serie C	4	1	1	0	5	1
Cuneo (loan)	2013–14	Lega Pro 2	9	0	0	0	9	0
Juve Stabia (loan)	2014–15	Serie C	9	2	0	0	9	2
Juve Stabia	2015–16	Serie C	27	2	2	1	29	3
Akragas	2016–17	Serie C	22	6	0	0	22	6
Catanzaro	2016–17	Serie C	14	0	0	0	14	0
Renate	2017–18	Serie C	29	11	3	2	32	13
Renate	2018–19	Serie C	34	6	1	0	35	6
Renate	Total		63	17	4	2	67	19
Triestina	2019–20	Serie C	27	7	0	0	27	7
Triestina	2020–21	Serie C	32	13	2	0	34	13
Triestina	2021–22	Serie C	31	7	0	0	31	7
Triestina	Total		90	27	2	0	92	27
Crotone	2022–23	Serie C	33	17	0	0	33	17
Career total			271	72	9	3	280	75
