= Cosimo Chiricò =

Italian footballer (born 1991)

Personal information
- Date of birth: 5 October 1991 (age 35)
- Place of birth: Brindisi, Italy
- Height: 1.69 m (5 ft 7 in)
- Positions: Winger; attacking midfielder

Team information
- Current team: Casarano
- Number: 10

Senior career*
Years	Team	Apps	(Gls)
2009–2013	Lecce	24	(5)
2009	→ Brindisi (loan)	2	(0)
2009–2010	→ Lamezia (loan)	30	(4)
2010–2011	→ Casarano (loan)	28	(6)
2011–2012	→ Lanciano (loan)	33	(3)
2013–2015	Parma	0	(0)
2013–2014	→ Latina (loan)	6	(0)
2014–2015	→ Ascoli (loan)	25	(3)
2015–2016	Prato	10	(2)
2016–2018	Foggia	72	(10)
2018	Cesena	7	(0)
2018	Lecce	1	(0)
2019–2020	Monza	40	(9)
2020–2021	Ascoli	18	(0)
2021	→ Padova (loan)	18	(7)
2021–2022	Padova	37	(11)
2022–2023	Crotone	37	(14)
2023–2025	Catania	35	(6)
2025	Cavese	9	(1)
2025–	Casarano	37	(18)
- * Club domestic league appearances and goals as of 1 May 2026

Cosimo Chiricò (born 5 October 1991) is an Italian professional footballer who plays as a winger or attacking midfielder for Serie C Group C club Casarano.

== Club career ==
=== Lecce ===
After having loan spells away, he became a member of Lecce's first team squad for the 2012–13 Lega Pro Prima Divisione season. He scored his first goal for the club in a 2–0 win over San Marino on 16 September and his second goal a week later in a 3–1 win against Treviso.

=== Parma ===
In summer 2013 Chiricò was signed by Serie A club Parma. On 29 July 2013 he was signed by Serie B club Latina on a temporary deal, joining Riccardo Brosco and Alessandro Iacobucci also from Parma.

On 20 June 2014 Chiricò and Cristian Dell'Orco were signed by Ascoli.

=== Prato ===
In October 2015 Cosimo signed for Prato.

=== Foggia ===
In January 2016 Cosimo signed for Foggia. He signed a new 3-year contract on 10 July 2017. However, on 31 January 2018 he was released by Foggia in a mutual consent.

=== Cesena ===
On 5 February 2018, he signed a contract with Cesena, until the end of season. He was assigned number 9 shirt, which was owned by Ettore Gliozzi.

=== Lecce ===
On 9 July 2018 he was signed by his former club Lecce, but made just one appearance in the Serie B.

=== Serie C ===
On 4 January 2019 he was signed by Monza on a permanent basis.

=== Return to Ascoli ===
On 23 September 2020 he returned to Ascoli on a permanent basis.

=== Back to Serie C ===
On 1 February 2021, he joined Serie C side Padova on loan. On 7 July 2021, he transferred to Padova on a permanent basis.

On 29 June 2022, Chiricò signed a three-year contract with Crotone.

On 14 July 2023, Chiricò joined Catania.

== Honours ==
Monza

- Serie C Group A: 2019–20
