= Davide Bove =

Italian footballer (born 1998)

Personal information
- Date of birth: 7 November 1998 (age 28)
- Place of birth: Benevento, Italy
- Height: 1.90 m (6 ft 3 in)
- Position: Centre-back

Team information
- Current team: Treviso
- Number: 5

Youth career
- Novara

Senior career*
Years	Team	Apps	(Gls)
2018–2021	Novara	62	(1)
2021–2022	Avellino	25	(1)
2022–2024	Crotone	32	(0)
2024–2026	Vis Pesaro	39	(1)
2026	Monopoli	7	(0)
2026–	Treviso	1	(0)
- * Club domestic league appearances and goals as of 23 August 2026

Davide Bove (born 7 November 1998) is an Italian professional footballer who plays as a centre-back for Serie C Group A club Treviso.

== Career ==
Born in Benevento, Bove started his career in Novara youth sector. He was promoted to the first team at 2018–19 Serie C season. He made his professional debut on 28 November against Pontedera.

In July 2019, he left football by heart problems. On 28 October 2019, Bove returned as a player.

On 21 August 2021, he signed with Avellino.

On 1 August 2022, Bove moved to Crotone on a two-year contract.
