= Stadio Omobono Tenni =

Football stadium in Treviso, Italy

Coordinates: 45°40′12″N 12°15′21″E

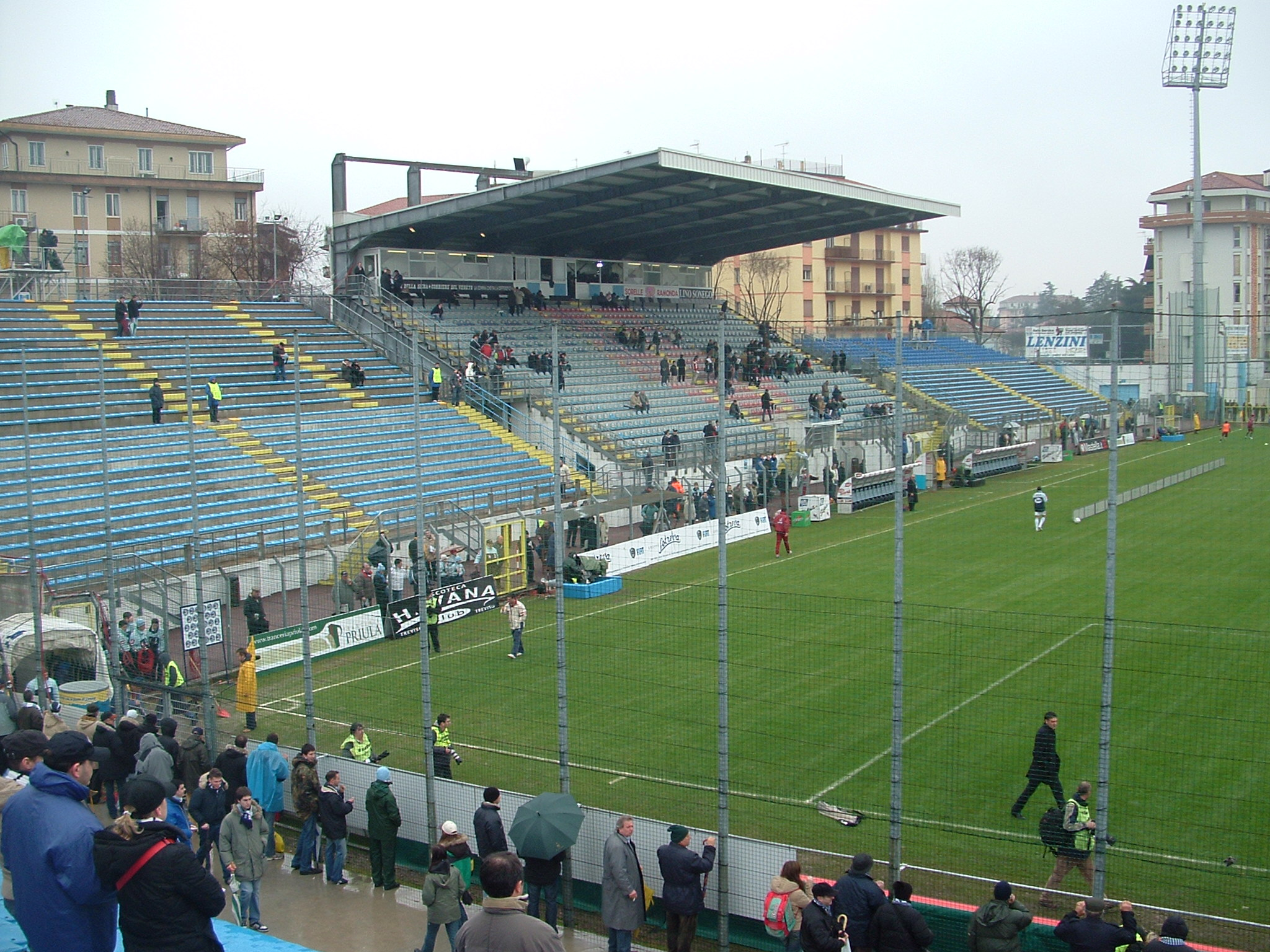
- Stadio Omobono Tenni in 2006
- Interactive map of Stadio Omobono Tenni
- Location: Treviso, Italy
- Owner: Municipality of Treviso
- Capacity: 10,000
- Surface: Grass; 105x68m

Construction
- Groundbreaking: 1933
- Opened: 1933
- Renovated: 1997; 2006

Tenant
- Treviso FBC 1993

Stadio Omobono Tenni (Italian pronunciation: [ˈstaːdjo omoˈbɔːno ˈtɛnni]) is a football stadium in Treviso, Italy. It is currently the home of Treviso FBC 1993. The stadium was built in 1933 and holds 10,001. After the inauguration in 1933, a friendly match between Treviso FBC and Udinese was held, which was followed by a friendly against the Italy National Team. In the 1940s and 1950s the capacity of the stadium was of 12,000 seats.

== History ==
The stadium was named after Omobono Tenni, a motorcycle road racer who lived in Treviso and fatally died in 1948 in Bern, Switzerland.

On 24 January 1960, the stadium played host to a rugby league international between Australia and Italy. In front of a crowd of 3,105 fans, the Kangaroos, playing the 37th and last game of their 1959–60 Kangaroo tour of Great Britain and France, defeated the home side 67–22 to complete a two-game sweep of the Italians to end the Kangaroo Tour on a high note.

The stadium was also temporary home to A.S. Cittadella for at least the 2008–09 Serie B season, until their own stadium, Stadio Pier Cesare Tombolato, was renovated to meet Serie B stadiums criteria.

Stadium distance from:

- Train Station: 3 km
- Venice Marco Polo Airport: 25 km
- Treviso S. Giuseppe Airport: 8 km
- Center of Treviso: 0.5 km
