= Tommaso Nobile =

Italian footballer (born 1996)

Personal information
- Full name: Tommaso Emmanuele Nobile
- Date of birth: 3 November 1996 (age 30)
- Place of birth: Naples, Italy
- Height: 1.94 m (6 ft 4 in)
- Position: Goalkeeper

Team information
- Current team: Treviso
- Number: 30

Senior career*
Years	Team	Apps	(Gls)
2014–2015	Sarnese	32	(0)
2015–2016	Matelica	34	(0)
2016–2017	Lucchese	36	(0)
2017–2020	Pro Vercelli	4	(0)
2018	→ Fano (loan)	38	(0)
2019–2020	→ Carpi (loan)	26	(0)
2020–2021	Sambenedettese	36	(0)
2021–2022	Virtus Francavilla	35	(0)
2022–2024	Foggia	42	(0)
2024	Taranto	0	(0)
2024–2026	Renate	72	(0)
2026–	Treviso	1	(0)
- * Club domestic league appearances and goals as of 23 August 2026

Tommaso Emmanuele Nobile (born 3 November 1996) is an Italian footballer who plays as a goalkeeper for Serie C Group A club Treviso.

== Club career ==
He made his Serie C debut for Lucchese on 25 September 2016 in a game against Arezzo.

On 13 August 2019, he joined Carpi on loan with an option to buy.

On 20 August 2020 he signed a 2-year contract with Sambenedettese.

On 18 August 2021, he moved to Virtus Francavilla.

On 8 July 2022, Nobile signed a two-year contract with Foggia.

On 2 July 2024, Nobile joined Taranto for one season. On 14 August 2024, before the season started, Nobile moved on a one-season contract to Renate.
