= Iacopo Cernigoi =

Italian footballer (born 1995)

Personal information
- Date of birth: 4 January 1995 (age 31)
- Place of birth: Mantua, Italy
- Height: 1.93 m (6 ft 4 in)
- Position: Forward

Team information
- Current team: Vado
- Number: 95

Youth career
- –2011: Mantova
- 2011–2014: AC Milan
- 2013: → Mantova (loan)

Senior career*
Years	Team	Apps	(Gls)
2014–2015	Pro Sesto	10	(1)
2015	→ Seregno (loan)	10	(0)
2015–2016	Virtus Verona	33	(17)
2016–2017	Vicenza	24	(1)
2017–2019	Pisa	14	(0)
2018	→ Paganese (loan)	16	(3)
2019–2021	Salernitana	0	(0)
2019	→ Rieti (loan)	15	(5)
2019–2020	→ Sambenedettese (loan)	23	(9)
2020–2021	→ Juve Stabia (loan)	10	(0)
2021–2022	Seregno	20	(5)
2022	→ Pescara (loan)	14	(1)
2022–2023	Feralpisalò	19	(0)
2023	Crotone	13	(2)
2023–2025	Rimini	37	(4)
2025	CFR Cluj	5	(0)
2026	Virtus Verona	13	(4)
2026–	Vado	7	(2)
- * Club domestic league appearances and goals as of 28 August 2026

Iacopo Cernigoi (born 4 January 1995) is an Italian professional footballer who plays as a forward for Serie C Group B club Vado.

== Club career ==
He made his professional debut in the Serie B for Vicenza on 27 August 2016 in a game against Carpi.

On 18 January 2019, he signed with Salernitana and was immediately loaned out to Rieti. On 14 July 2019, he joined Sambenedettese on a season-long loan.

On 5 October 2020 he joined Juve Stabia on loan.

On 1 August 2021, he signed with Seregno. On 31 January 2022, Cernigoi was loaned to Pescara.

On 14 July 2022, Cernigoi moved to Feralpisalò on a three-year contract.

On 12 January 2023, Cernigoi signed a 1.5-year contract with Crotone.

On 16 August 2023, Cernigoi joined Rimini on a two-year contract.

On 19 September 2025, he joined Liga I club CFR Cluj on a free transfer.

== Honours ==
AC Milan Primavera

- Torneo di Viareggio: 2014

Feralpisalò

- Serie C: 2022–23 (Group A)
