= Thomas Vettorel =

Italian footballer

Personal information
- Date of birth: 17 September 2000 (age 26)
- Place of birth: Feltre, Italy
- Height: 1.90 m (6 ft 3 in)
- Position: Goalkeeper

Team information
- Current team: Lecco
- Number: 22

Youth career
- –2019: Cittadella

Senior career*
Years	Team	Apps	(Gls)
2018–2019	→ Pro Sesto (loan)	10	(0)
2019–2020	Savona	20	(0)
2020–2021	Piacenza	10	(0)
2021–2023	Frosinone	0	(0)
2021–2022	→ Carrarese (loan)	34	(0)
2022–2023	→ Monopoli (loan)	28	(0)
2023–2024	Gubbio	27	(0)
2024–2026	Cosenza	26	(0)
2026–	Lecco	0	(0)
- * Club domestic league appearances and goals as of 1 May 2026

Thomas Vettorel (born 17 September 2000) is an Italian professional footballer who plays as a goalkeeper for Serie C Group A club Lecco.

== Club career ==
On 1 February 2021 he signed with Frosinone.

On 22 July 2021, he joined Carrarese on loan. On 22 July 2022, Vettorel was loaned to Monopoli.

On 25 July 2024, Vettorel signed with Cosenza in Serie B for two seasons, with an option for a third.
