= Giuseppe Cuomo =

Italian footballer

Personal information
- Date of birth: 2 February 1998 (age 28)
- Place of birth: Vico Equense, Italy
- Height: 1.90 m (6 ft 3 in)
- Position: Defender

Team information
- Current team: Vicenza
- Number: 14

Youth career
- Crotone

Senior career*
Years	Team	Apps	(Gls)
2017–2023	Crotone	86	(3)
2018	→ Rende (loan)	14	(1)
2023–2024	Südtirol	10	(0)
2024	→ Vicenza (loan)	16	(2)
2024–	Vicenza	60	(2)

International career^{‡}
2020	Italy U21	2	(0)
- * Club domestic league appearances and goals as of 29 April 2026 ‡ National team caps and goals as of 19:43, 18 November 2020 (UTC)

Giuseppe Cuomo (born 2 February 1998) is an Italian footballer who plays for Serie B side Vicenza as a defender.

== Career ==
Cuomo made his professional debut for Crotone in a Serie A 3–0 loss to Napoli on 12 March 2017. He stayed with Crotone through their relegation to Serie B and then Serie C.

On 7 August 2023, Cuomo signed a three-year contract with Südtirol. On 10 January 2024, he was loaned to Vicenza, with an option to buy. On 13 June 2024, Vicenza exercised the option and signed a two-season contract with Cuomo.
