= US Città di Pontedera =

Italian football club

Pontedera
- Full name: Unione Sportiva Città di Pontedera
- Nickname: Granata
- Founded: 1912; 114 years ago
- Ground: Stadio Ettore Mannucci, Pontedera, Italy
- Capacity: 5,014
- Chairman: Gianfranco Donnini
- Manager: Leonardo Menichini
- League: Serie D
- 2025–26: Serie C Group B, 19th of 20 (relegated)
- Website: www.uspontedera.it
Home colours	Away colours

Unione Sportiva Città di Pontedera (formerly Unione Sportiva Pontedera 1912) is an Italian association football club located in Pontedera, Tuscany. Currently, it plays in Serie C, the third tier of Italian football.

== History ==
Founded in 1912, Pontedera, a team from a city in the Pisa neighbourhood, played Serie C for several years without ever gaining a single promotion to Serie B. In 1993/1994, a second place in Serie C2/B allowed Pontedera to be promoted to Serie C1: during that season, the team was known for having longily been the only undefeated team in all Italian professional leagues, and for having incredibly won 2–1 to the Italy national football team coached by Arrigo Sacchi in a friendly match played in April 1994. Pontedera played Serie C1 just in 1994/1995, and was relegated to Serie D in 2001, and even to Eccellenza in 2002. Pontedera returned to Serie D in 2005, after having won its Eccellenza round.

In 2006, Maurizio Mian's Gunther Corporation briefly held a controlling interest in Pontedera. Pornographic film actor Ilona Staller ("Cicciolina") was installed as the club "godmother", while another pornographic actress Valentine Demy served as one of three club Presidents, alongside a Polish lap dancer named Karolcia and a British rapper named Prodigal1. The performance was related to Mian's left-libertarian views on reproductive rights and his upcoming appearance in the 2006 Italian general election.

Marcello Lippi, head coach of the Italy national team and World Cup champion in the 2006 FIFA World Cup, began his managerial career as head coach of Pontedera in 1985–1986.

=== Serie D 2010–11 ===
At the end of the 2010-11 Serie D season, Pontedera qualified for the Serie D play-offs for promotion to Lega Pro Seconda Divisione, but were eliminated in the third round.

=== Back into professionalism ===
In the 2012-13 Lega Pro Seconda Divisione season, Pontedera finished second in Girone B, and was promoted to Lega Pro Prima Divisione. This was the team's second consecutive promotion. The 2013–14 season saw Pontedera topping the Lega Pro Prima Divisione table in the early weeks, then completing the regular season in eighth place and thus securing a Serie B promotion playoff spot, before losing to Lecce on penalties in the first round.

== Colors and badge ==
Its colours are all dark red.

== Current squad ==
As of 12 June 2026 Note: Flags indicate national team as defined under FIFA eligibility rules; some limited exceptions apply. Players may hold more than one non-FIFA nationality.

No.	Pos.	Nation	Player
1	GK	ITA	Tommaso Vannucchi (on loan from Fiorentina)
3	DF	SUI	Daniel Leo (on loan from Crotone)
5	DF	ITA	Francesco Corradini (on loan from Sassuolo)
6	DF	ITA	Ousmane Gueye (on loan from Torino)
7	MF	ITA	Simone Emmanuello
8	MF	ITA	Filippo Faggi (on loan from Bari)
13	DF	LTU	Motiejus Šapola
14	MF	ITA	Matteo Manfredonia
15	DF	ITA	Luciano Ballan
16	FW	CZE	Louis Buffon (on loan from Pisa)
17	FW	ITA	Pablo Vitali
18	DF	ITA	Lapo Paolieri
20	MF	ITA	Riccardo Pietrelli

No.	Pos.	Nation	Player
21	MF	URU	Thiago Lugano (on loan from Beerschot)
22	GK	ITA	Valerio Biagini
23	DF	ITA	Cristian Cerretti
25	FW	POR	Herculano Nabian (on loan from Empoli)
26	MF	URU	Guillermo Wagner
27	DF	BEL	Jeremy Mbambi (on loan from Pisa)
32	DF	ITA	Lorenzo Beghetto
33	DF	ITA	Andrea Fancelli
40	GK	ITA	Umberto Saracco
45	FW	GHA	Philip Yeboah (on loan from Monopoli)
77	FW	ITA	Francesco Dell'Aquila (on loan from Torino)
88	MF	ITA	Andrea Caponi
94	DF	ITA	Luca Piana

=== Out on loan ===
Note: Flags indicate national team as defined under FIFA eligibility rules; some limited exceptions apply. Players may hold more than one non-FIFA nationality.

No.	Pos.	Nation	Player
—	DF	ITA	Edoardo Vona (at Caratese until 30 June 2026)
—	MF	ITA	Riccardo Ladinetti (at Perugia until 30 June 2026)
—	MF	ITA	Simone Milazzo (at San Marino until 30 June 2026)

No.	Pos.	Nation	Player
—	MF	ITA	Gabriele Perretta (at Cittadella until 30 June 2026)
—	FW	ITA	Andrea Coviello (at Cannara until 30 June 2026)

== Notable former managers ==
- Marcello Lippi
