= Theophilus Awua =

Nigerian footballer (born 1998)

Personal information
- Full name: Theophilus Aondofa Awua
- Date of birth: 24 April 1998 (age 28)
- Place of birth: Makurdi, Benue State, Nigeria
- Height: 1.76 m (5 ft 9 in)
- Position: Midfielder

Team information
- Current team: Cavese
- Number: 5

Youth career
- –2016: Abuja
- 2016–2017: Spezia
- 2016–2017: → Inter (loan)

Senior career*
Years	Team	Apps	(Gls)
2017–2021	Spezia	1	(0)
2017	→ Juve Stabia (loan)	1	(0)
2018–2019	→ Rende (loan)	31	(4)
2019–2020	→ Bari (loan)	17	(1)
2020	→ Livorno (loan)	14	(0)
2020–2021	→ Cittadella (loan)	3	(0)
2021	→ Pro Vercelli (loan)	18	(0)
2021–2023	Pro Vercelli	14	(0)
2022–2023	→ Crotone (loan)	46	(2)
2023–2024	Crotone	0	(0)
2023–2024	→ Atalanta Under-23 (loan)	20	(0)
2024	Atalanta Under-23	0	(0)
2024–2025	SPAL	24	(1)
2025–	Cavese	26	(0)
- * Club domestic league appearances and goals as of 1 May 2026

Theophilus Aondofa Awua (born 24 April 1998) is a Nigerian professional footballer who plays as a midfielder for Serie C Group C club Cavese.

== Career ==
Awua made his Serie C debut for Juve Stabia on 16 September 2017 in a game against Trapani.

Having returned to Spezia, he scored a goal against Pro Vercelli in the match that Spezia went on to win 5–1.

On 5 July 2018, he joined Serie C club Rende on a season-long loan.

On 2 September 2019, he joined Serie C club Bari on loan from Spezia. On 30 January 2020, he was loaned to Livorno.

On 8 September 2020, he joined Cittadella on loan.

On 21 January 2021, he joined Pro Vercelli on loan. In June 2021, he joined the club permanently.

On 12 January 2022, he went to Crotone on loan. On 19 July 2022, Awua returned to Crotone on a new loan with an obligation to buy.

On 29 August 2023, Crotone announced Awua's loan to Atalanta with an option to buy and a conditional obligation to buy. He played with the club's reserve team in Serie C.

On 20 August 2024, Awua signed a two-season contract with SPAL.
