= Vladimir Golemić =

Serbian footballer

Personal information
- Date of birth: 28 June 1991 (age 35)
- Place of birth: Kruševac, SFR Yugoslavia
- Height: 1.92 m (6 ft 4 in)
- Position: Centre-back

Youth career
- 2009–2010: Šampion

Senior career*
Years	Team	Apps	(Gls)
2009–2010	Šampion	1	(0)
2010–2011	Energie Cottbus II	10	(0)
2011–2012	Šampion	25	(2)
2013–2015	Mladost Lučani	92	(8)
2016	Chiasso	13	(1)
2016–2018	Lugano	65	(1)
2018–2021	Crotone	82	(5)
2021–2022	Lamia	9	(1)
2022–2023	Crotone	48	(4)
2023–2024	Vicenza	35	(1)
2025	Mladost Lučani	6	(0)
2025–2026	Salernitana	29	(2)
- * Club domestic league appearances and goals as of 1 May 2026

Vladimir Golemić (Serbian Cyrillic: Владимир Големић; born 28 June 1991) is a Serbian professional footballer who plays as a centre-back.

== Career ==
On 31 January 2022, Golemić returned to Crotone on a contract until 30 June 2022, with a conditional extension option based on performance.

On 2 August 2023, Golemić moved to Vicenza on a two-year contract. Before the 2024–25 season, he was not able to obtain license to play for undisclosed medical reasons. On 6 December 2024, Golemić left Vicenza by mutual consent.

== Personal life ==
Golemić is of Polish descent through a grandmother, and holds dual Serbian-Polish citizenship.

== Honours ==
Mladost Lučani

- Serbian First League: 2013–14
