= Mattia Rolando =

Italian footballer, midfielder

Personal information
- Full name: Mattia Eugio Rolando
- Date of birth: 5 November 1992 (age 34)
- Place of birth: Cuorgnè, Italy
- Height: 1.76 m (5 ft 9 in)
- Position: Midfielder

Team information
- Current team: Lumezzane
- Number: 19

Youth career
- Alessandria

Senior career*
Years	Team	Apps	(Gls)
2010–2011	Aquanera Comollo Novi	34	(4)
2011	Lavagnese	12	(1)
2011–2012	Novese	22	(7)
2012–2013	Gavorrano	2	(0)
2013	Vallée d'Aoste	8	(0)
2013–2015	Asti	67	(14)
2015–2016	Bellinzago	37	(7)
2016–2017	Varese	44	(6)
2017–2018	Caronnese	19	(2)
2018–2019	Gozzano	21	(7)
2019–2020	Arezzo	38	(3)
2020–2022	Pro Vercelli	70	(16)
2022–2023	Monopoli	33	(2)
2023–2024	Renate	16	(2)
2024	→ Foggia (loan)	15	(1)
2024–2025	Team Altamura	32	(3)
2025–	Lumezzane	37	(4)
- * Club domestic league appearances and goals as of 29 April 2026

Mattia Eugio Rolando (born 5 November 1992) is an Italian footballer who plays as a midfielder for Serie C Group A club Lumezzane.

== Club career ==
Rolando made his professional, Serie C debut in the Gozzano in the first round of 2018–19 Serie C, on 17 September 2018 against Virtus Entella, playing 90 minutes. He signed to Arezzo in January 2019.

On 31 January 2020, he moved to Pro Vercelli.

On 25 June 2022, Rolando signed a two-year contract with Monopoli.

On 1 February 2024, Rolando joined Foggia on loan.
