= Andrea Dini =

Italian footballer (born 1996)

Personal information
- Date of birth: 20 February 1996 (age 30)
- Place of birth: Cattolica, Italy
- Height: 1.85 m (6 ft 1 in)
- Position: Goalkeeper

Team information
- Current team: Catania
- Number: 57

Youth career
- –2012: Rimini

Senior career*
Years	Team	Apps	(Gls)
2012–2016	Rimini	34	(0)
2015–2016	→ San Marino (loan)	37	(0)
2016	Messina	0	(0)
2016–2017	San Marino	29	(0)
2017–2021	Parma	0	(0)
2018–2020	→ Trapani (loan)	41	(0)
2020	→ Avellino (loan)	8	(0)
2021	→ Padova (loan)	8	(0)
2021–2022	Fidelis Andria	18	(0)
2022	Juve Stabia	16	(0)
2022–2024	Crotone	50	(0)
2024–2025	Catanzaro	0	(0)
2025–	Catania	51	(0)
- * Club domestic league appearances and goals as of 1 May 2026

Andrea Dini (born 20 February 1996) is an Italian professional footballer who plays as a goalkeeper for Serie C Group C club Catania.

== Career ==
=== Rimini ===
He is the product of Rimini and started making bench appearances for the senior squad in the 2012–13 season of Lega Pro Seconda Divisione at the age of 16. After the reorganization of Italian lower-leagues system Rimini was moved to Serie D and he became the first-choice goalkeeper for the club in the 2014–15 season.

==== Loan to San Marino ====
On 24 July 2015, he joined San Marino, also in the Serie D, on a season-long loan.

=== Messina ===
On 20 July 2016, he joined Messina. However, he left the club just a month later without appearing in any competitive games.

=== Return to San Marino ===
He returned to San Marino on 1 September 2016 on a permanent basis.

=== Parma ===
On 1 August 2017, he signed a two-year contract with Serie B club Parma. He was the backup for the whole 2017–18 season to Pierluigi Frattali, not making any league appearances.

==== Loan to Trapani ====
On 10 August 2018, he joined Trapani in Serie C on a season-long loan. He made his Serie C debut for Trapani on 18 September 2018 in a game against Reggina.

Trapani was promoted to Serie B and the loan was renewed for another season on 29 July 2019. He made his Serie B debut on 24 August 2019 in a game against Ascoli. After starting Trapani's first three games in Serie B, he lost his starting position to Marco Carnesecchi.

==== Loan to Avellino ====
On 24 January 2020 he moved on loan to Serie C club Avellino.

==== Loan to Padova ====
On 1 February 2021 he was loaned to Padova in Serie C.

=== Serie C clubs ===
On 30 August 2021, he signed with Fidelis Andria. On 24 January 2022, he moved to Juve Stabia. On 18 July 2022, Dini signed a two-year contract with Crotone.

=== Catanzaro ===
On 19 July 2024, Dini signed a one-year contract with Catanzaro in Serie B.

=== Catania ===
On 17 January 2025, Dini moved to Catania on a one-and-a-half-year contract.
