= Amara Konate (Guinean footballer) =

Guinean footballer

Personal information
- Date of birth: 1 February 1999 (age 27)
- Place of birth: Nzérékoré, Guinea
- Height: 1.80 m (5 ft 11 in)
- Position: Midfielder

Team information
- Current team: L'Aquila (on loan from Cavese)

Youth career
- 2017–2018: Perugia

Senior career*
| Years | Team | Apps | (Gls) |
| 2018–2021 | Perugia | 10 | (0) |
| 2018–2019 | → Rieti (loan) | 16 | (0) |
| 2021–2023 | Messina | 53 | (1) |
| 2023– | Cavese | 51 | (1) |
| 2025–2026 | → Nocerina (loan) | 15 | (1) |
| 2026– | → L'Aquila (loan) | 0 | (0) |
- * Club domestic league appearances and goals as of 25 January 2026

Amara Konate (born 1 February 1999) is a Guinean professional footballer who plays as a midfielder for Serie D club L'Aquila, on loan from Cavese.

== Personal life ==
Born in Nzérékoré, Guinea, Konate left his native country in 2017 to move to Europe, crossing the Mediterranean Sea via Libya and then finally settling down to Italy. After landing to Catania, he was moved to an immigration center in Cassino, where he started playing football with a local team, despite not having ever seriously played the game before.

== Career ==
=== Perugia ===
While in Cassino, he was noticed by a football agent, who proposed him to Perugia; on his trial, he convinced the club managers to sign him, joining the club's Under-19 squad in the 2017–18 season.

==== Loan to Rieti ====
On 1 October 2018, Serie C club Rieti officially announced that Konate joined them on a season-long loan. He made his Serie C debut for Rieti earlier, on 29 September 2018 in a game against Cavese as a 90th-minute substitute for Boubakary Diarra.

=== Messina ===
On 30 July 2021, he joined Messina.
