= Treviso FBC =

Association football club

Treviso
- Full name: Treviso Foot Ball Club
- Nicknames: I Biancocelesti (The White and Sky Blues)
- Founded: 1909; 117 years ago (as Football Club Treviso); 1993; 33 years ago (as Treviso FC 1993); 2009; 17 years ago (as ASD Treviso 2009); 2013; 13 years ago (as ACD Treviso); 2021; 5 years ago (as Treviso FBC 1993)
- Ground: Stadio Omobono Tenni
- Capacity: 4,600 (Note: The stadium's nominal capacity is considerably higher, but sections have been closed as unfit for use. It was licensed for 4,980 spectators in January 2026, and the figure given is the capacity following the alterations made for the club's return to Serie C in August 2026.)
- Chairman: Louis Sandri
- Manager: Edoardo Gorini
- League: Serie C Group A
- 2025–26: Serie D Group C, 1st of 18 (promoted)
- Website: trevisocalcio.tv
Home colours	Away colours	Third colours

Treviso Foot Ball Club, commonly known as Treviso, is an Italian football club based in Treviso, Veneto, which competes in Serie C, the third tier of Italian football.

Formed in 2019, the club continues a tradition dating to the founding of Foot-Ball Club Treviso in 1909 and interrupted by a succession of bankruptcies and refoundations from 1993 onwards. Its principal achievement is a single season in Serie A, in 2005–06, reached through readmission rather than promotion; it has also won a Serie C Supercup and a Coppa Italia Dilettanti. Treviso have played at the Stadio Omobono Tenni since 1933.

== History ==
=== Early years and the post-war decades (1909–1993) ===
Football was first played in Treviso in 1896, when three local gymnastics societies took part in an interprovincial competition, and several teams formed in the city over the following decade. Foot-Ball Club Treviso was founded in 1909, though for some years its fixtures were friendlies rather than league matches, and the city's best players left to play elsewhere. Treviso entered Promozione in 1914 and, after the First World War, won the Coppa Appiani in 1919, beating Padova, Bologna and Modena. A first international fixture followed in June 1922, a 4–0 home win over Meteor Vienna.

The club moved to its present ground in 1933 and was renamed Associazione Calcio Treviso two years later, entering Serie C in 1936. Promotion to Serie B was approached several times before the Second World War and achieved in 1950. Nereo Rocco took charge for the 1950–51 season and led Treviso to sixth place the following year, the best finish in the club's history, and to ninth in his final season. Relegation followed in 1955, after which Treviso spent three decades in Serie C, with occasional spells in Serie D.

A further relegation in 1985 was followed by repeated financial difficulties, and in 1991 the club dropped into the Campionato Interregionale, where it remained for four years. It won the Coppa Italia Dilettanti in 1993, beating Imolese in the final, but was wound up that summer with its debts unresolved.

=== Treviso FBC 1993 and the rise to Serie A (1993–2009) ===
A new club, FBC Treviso 1993, was admitted to Serie D in the summer of 1993 under the businessman Giovanni Caberlotto, and rose three divisions in four years under Giuseppe Pillon to reach Serie B for the first time in more than four decades. Caberlotto did not see it: he died on 3 March 1997, weeks before promotion was secured. Four seasons in the second tier followed before relegation to Serie C1 in 2001, a year also marked by the abuse of Akeem Omolade, an 18-year-old Nigerian forward, by sections of Treviso's own support on his debut; his teammates took the field at a later match with their faces blacked in solidarity, and the episode drew national attention.

Treviso won promotion back to Serie B at the second attempt in 2003, taking the Serie C Supercup on penalties against Avellino in the same season, and two years later reached the promotion play-offs under a returning Pillon, losing to Perugia in the semi-finals. Promotion arrived anyway that August, off the field: with Genoa demoted for match-fixing and Torino unable to meet their financial obligations, Treviso and Ascoli were readmitted to Serie A in their place.

The club's only season in the top flight was shaped by the manner of its arrival. A squad assembled in a matter of days lost 3–0 at Inter Milan on the opening day and played its early home fixtures in Padua, the Stadio Omobono Tenni having been judged unfit for Serie A, before a parliamentary dispensation allowed a return to the city. Three coaches took charge during the campaign, none of them able to lift the team off the bottom of the table, and relegation was confirmed with five matches to play by defeat at Messina on 9 April 2006. Treviso finished bottom with 21 points from 38 games, and were classified 19th only when the Calciopoli verdicts placed Juventus below them.

Back in Serie B, Treviso survived on the final day of 2006–07 with a win at Spezia and again in 2007–08, finishing 17th, but the accounts were deteriorating: losses of €4.17 million in a single season followed a recapitalisation of more than €7.5 million, the club increasingly depended on selling players, and two prospective takeovers collapsed once the scale of the debts became clear. The 2008–09 season began in mourning for the midfielder Gionata Mingozzi, killed in a road accident, and with registration delayed over unpaid tax and a three-point deduction imposed for a contractual breach dating from the promotion of 2005. Relegation was confirmed on 11 May 2009 with three matches remaining.

On 11 July 2009, the president Ettore Setten announced that the club could not be saved and would not register for Lega Pro Prima Divisione; an application two days later to enter Serie D instead, with a new company and new owners to follow, was refused by the FIGC.

=== Refoundation and second exclusion (2009–2013) ===
For most of the summer it appeared that Treviso would field no team at all. A place was found only on 1 September, when the city's mayor announced that a newly formed company, ASD Treviso 2009, would enter the regional Eccellenza—four divisions below the Serie B side of the previous season. After a seventh-place finish and a change of owner, the club was readmitted to Serie D in August 2010 and won the division at the first attempt under Diego Zanin, taking the title with a match to spare after a season-long contest with Venezia. Renamed Football Club Treviso in June 2011, it went up again twelve months later as champions of Seconda Divisione, restoring professional football to the city three years after the collapse.

The recovery did not last. Treviso were excluded from the 2012–13 Lega Pro Prima Divisione over their finances and reinstated only on appeal, lost Zanin, and spent the first half of the season bottom of the table. By January the club was the subject of a boardroom dispute in which rival claimants to the presidency dismissed and reinstated the manager in turn. Relegation followed, and when the Lega Pro ruled the club's registration for the next season inadmissible and no appeal was lodged, Treviso were expelled from professional football for the second time in four years.

=== Amateur years and further refoundations (2013–2021) ===
The badge of ACD Treviso, which carried the city's football from 2013 to 2019

A third club, ACD Treviso, was admitted to Promozione, the seventh tier, in 2013. Federal rules recognising the city's 65 professional seasons made the restart possible, while the two bankruptcies in four years and the financial guarantees required in higher divisions dictated how far down it began. Promotion to Eccellenza came at the first attempt, but the club changed hands three times between the summer of 2016 and March 2017, and a dispute over who was legally its president left it unable to register players. Three fixtures went unfulfilled before a side assembled from free agents lost 10–0 to San Donà, the heaviest defeat in the club's history, and relegation followed. Treviso won the regional cup in 2018 to earn readmission to Eccellenza, but were sold that November to a London-based sports management company, which dismantled the first team and left them bottom of the table and relegated again.

When ACD Treviso did not register for the 2019–20 season, the city's footballing tradition passed to Treviso Academy, formed that June by the merger of a youth club of the same name with neighbouring Nervesa and backed by a consortium that took the city's basketball club as its model. It began in Promozione and was promoted to Eccellenza when the pandemic cut short a season it was leading.

=== Revival (2021–present) ===
Renamed Treviso FBC 1993 in 2021, a style later shortened to Treviso FBC, the club returned to Serie D in 2023, sealing the Eccellenza Veneto title on the final day with a home win over Giorgione to end a decade outside the national divisions. Two near misses followed: a third-place finish and a play-off semi-final defeat in 2023–24, then a title race lost to Dolomiti Bellunesi and defeat in the play-off final.

Edoardo Gorini, who had spent four seasons in Serie B with Cittadella, took charge in 2025 and won Group C with four matches to spare, promotion being confirmed on 2 April 2026 and returning Treviso to the professional game after thirteen years.

== Stadium ==
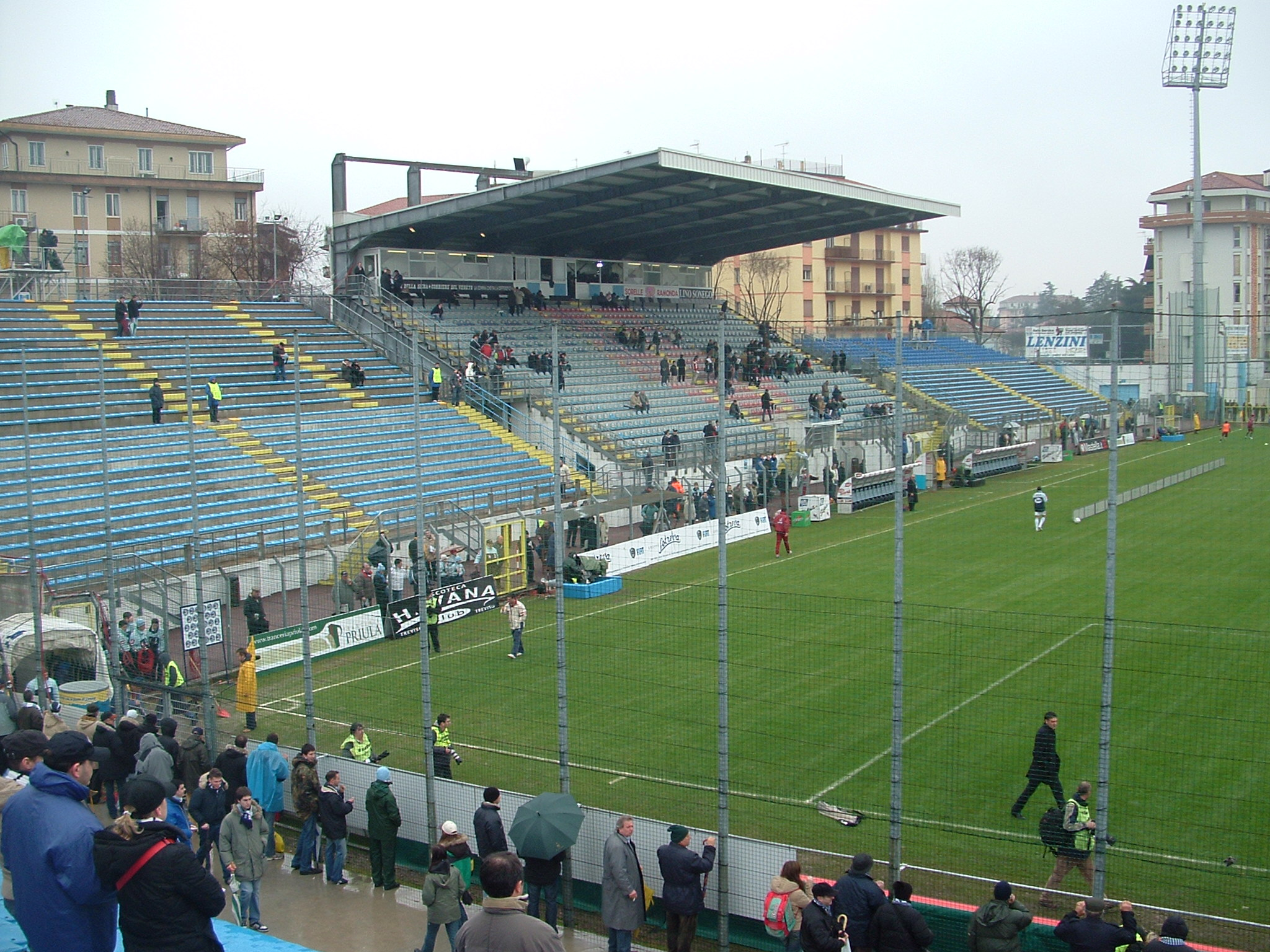
The main stand at the Stadio Omobono Tenni

Treviso used six grounds before settling at their present home. The first was the parade ground at Santa Maria del Rovere, used until 1913, after which the club played at the De Donà warehouses on the Terraglio road, at a site on Appiani land known as the Eden, in Viale Luzzatti, and at the Van Den Borre ground, before returning to Santa Maria del Rovere in 1920 to a new pitch that served until 1933.

The municipal stadium on Via Ugo Foscolo, built beside the city walls at Porta Piave, was completed in 1933 and opened that October with friendly matches against Udinese and the Italy national team. Named the Stadio Comunale del Littorio, it held about 4,000 in its covered and uncovered stands with as many again in the enclosure, and was enlarged over the following two decades to take close to 12,000. It was renamed in 1963 after Omobono Tenni, a motorcycle road racer born in Tirano who settled in the city and was killed at Bremgarten, near Bern, in 1948. Little was done to the ground during the club's decades in the lower divisions; promotion to Serie B in 1997 brought a rebuilding that set the capacity at 9,435, and a further reconstruction followed in 2006 for the season in Serie A. The stadium's position close to the historic centre, overlooked by flats from which residents could watch matches, has long created difficulties with crowd safety, particularly for the derby against Venezia. It remains municipally owned and is leased to the club until 2028.

Treviso have played elsewhere on three occasions. The club spent the 1997–98 season at the Comunale di Monigo, the city's rugby ground, while the stadium was rebuilt, and opened its 2005–06 Serie A campaign at the Stadio Euganeo in Padua because the Tenni did not meet top-flight requirements; a parliamentary dispensation later allowed a return to the city. In the spring of 2017, during a dispute between the club and the municipality, home matches were played at the municipal grounds in Giavera del Montello and, once, Volpago del Montello. The ground has also housed other clubs, Cittadella using it for the 2008–09 season while their own stadium was brought up to Serie B standard.

By 2026 the Tenni was licensed for 4,980 spectators, far below its nominal capacity, with sections closed as unfit for use, and promotion to Serie C required work on floodlighting, dugouts, dressing rooms and broadcast facilities. Work costing €1.2 million, of which the club met €700,000 and the municipality €500,000, began that June with the demolition of the disused south side stand to create 580 seats, and included LED floodlighting, new seating in both side stands, a public address system and television and surveillance installations. The stadium reopened to professional football with a capacity of about 4,600 for the visit of Lecco on 31 August 2026, Treviso being one of only three promoted clubs able to begin the season at their own ground. A new stadium elsewhere in the city has been discussed as a longer-term alternative.

== Colours, crest and anthem ==
Treviso play in white and sky blue, the colours of the city's banner, and are known as i Biancocelesti ("the white and sky blues"). The club did not begin with them: from its foundation in 1909 until its affiliation to the FIGC in 1914 it wore black and white, and adopted the municipal colours when the reconstituted Foot-Ball Club Treviso entered the first Città di Treviso tournament in 1914. The change was acknowledged by the club in 2026, when it issued a black-and-white third shirt in tribute to its origins, the foundation year embroidered behind the collar.

The home shirt is customarily striped in white and sky blue. The 2026–27 version, made by Erreà and presented to supporters in Piazzetta Aldo Moro before the club's first home match back in Serie C, carried vertical stripes that converge at the foot of the shirt to form the point of the cross from the club crest, with blue trim at the collar and cuffs. That season the club was also the only Italian participant in a Lenovo campaign for which the designer Marco Oggian produced a fourth shirt, developed through workshops with supporters and residents and bearing stylised images of the Porta San Tomaso and the civic tower in Piazza dei Signori; proceeds went to the club's programmes for young children and for its powerchair football team.

The club's crests have historically followed the arms of the city: a white cross on red, with two eight-pointed stars in the upper cantons beneath a crown. The badge used by ACD Treviso between 2013 and 2019 was replaced on the club's refoundation by a revival of the historic design.

From 1998 until the club's bankruptcy in 2009, its anthem was "Il calcio del sorriso" ("The Football of the Smile"), with music by Red Canzian, the bassist of Pooh, who was born at Quinto di Treviso and supports the club, and words by Miki Porru. Canzian recorded it with his daughter Chiara and his stepson Philipp Mersa, and performed it with them at the Stadio Omobono Tenni on 22 November 1998, before a Serie B match against Lucchese.

== Current squad ==
As of 4 September 2026

Note: Flags indicate national team as defined under FIFA eligibility rules; some limited exceptions apply. Players may hold more than one non-FIFA nationality.

No.	Pos.	Nation	Player
1	GK	ITA	Riccardo Bisetto
2	DF	ITA	Alberto Brigati
4	MF	ITA	Gianluca Rossi (on loan from Genoa)
5	DF	ITA	Davide Bove
7	MF	ITA	Tommaso Brevi
8	DF	ITA	Daniel Cappelletti
9	DF	ITA	Christian Tommasini
10	FW	ITA	Flavio Ciuferri
11	DF	ITA	Carlo Mellino (on loan from Avellino)
13	DF	ITA	Alessio Maestrelli
14	DF	ITA	Alessandro Vimercati
17	MF	ITA	Luca Paganini
19	MF	ITA	Filippo Artioli

No.	Pos.	Nation	Player
21	DF	ITA	Mirco Ceccacci
22	GK	ITA	Pietro Leonardelli (on loan from Fiorentina)
25	MF	ITA	Federico Romeo
27	MF	AUT	Robert Gucher
29	FW	ITA	Erik Gerbi
30	GK	ITA	Tommaso Nobile
44	DF	FRA	Franck Guiyong (on loan from Modena)
59	DF	ITA	Filippo De Lazzari
76	MF	ITA	Alessio Lombardi
78	FW	ITA	Daniel Ndulue (on loan from Genoa)
91	FW	ITA	Raphael Odogwu
94	DF	ITA	Daniele Liotti
—	MF	ITA	Alessio Vita (on loan from Cittadella)

=== Out on loan ===
Note: Flags indicate national team as defined under FIFA eligibility rules; some limited exceptions apply. Players may hold more than one non-FIFA nationality.

No. / Pos. / Nation / Player; — / DF / ITA / Gregorio Zuin (at San Donà until 30 June 2027)	No. / Pos. / Nation / Player; — / FW / ITA / Nicolò Francescotti (at Anzio until 30 June 2027)

== Honours ==
- Supercoppa di Lega Serie C1:
  - Winners (1): 2003
- Serie C1:
  - Winners (2): 1996–07, 2002–03
- Lega Pro Seconda Divisione:
  - Winners (2): 1995–96 (As Serie C2), 2011–12
- Serie D:
  - Winners (3): 1974–75, 1994–95, 2010–11, 2025–26
- Eccellenza Veneto:
  - Winners (1): 2022–23
- Promozione Veneto:
  - Winners (1): 2020–21
- Coppa Italia Dilettanti:
  - Winners (1): 1992–93
