= Luca Gozzo =

Italian footballer (born 2004)

Personal information
- Date of birth: 1 December 2004 (age 21)
- Place of birth: Italy
- Position: Winger

Team information
- Current team: Leon
- Number: 99

Youth career
- 2020–2022: Crotone
- 2022–2023: → Frosinone U19 (loan)

Senior career*
Years	Team	Apps	(Gls)
2022–2024	Crotone	1	(0)
2023	→ Corticella (loan)	6	(0)
2024	Mori S. Stefano	12	(0)
2024	Varesina	7	(0)
2024–2025	NovaRomentin	36	(4)
2025–	Leon	2	(0)
- * Club domestic league appearances and goals as of 22 February 2026

Luca Gozzo (born 1 December 2004) is an Italian footballer who plays for Serie D club Leon.

== Career ==
=== Crotone ===
As a youth player, Gozzo joined the youth academy of Crotone. In 2022, he was promoted to the first team.

Gozzo made his debut for then-Serie B side Crotone on 30 April 2022 as a late substitute in a 3–3 draw vs. Pordenone. Crotone were relegated to Serie C at the end of the season.

==== Loan to Frosinone ====
Gozzo joined the U19 team of Serie B team Frosinone on loan, with an option to buy, for the 2022–23 season. He made his Campionato Primavera 1 debut on 28 August 2022 in a 2-0 loss vs. Lecce.
