= Gabriele Bernardotto =

Italian footballer

Personal information
- Date of birth: 22 April 1997 (age 29)
- Place of birth: Rome, Italy
- Height: 1.88 m (6 ft 2 in)
- Position: Forward

Team information
- Current team: Monopoli
- Number: 9

Youth career
- –2015: L'Aquila
- 2015–2016: Lupa Roma

Senior career*
Years	Team	Apps	(Gls)
2015–2016	Lupa Roma	1	(0)
2016–2017	Anzio	28	(6)
2017–2018	Trastevere	29	(7)
2018–2019	Lanusei	33	(16)
2019–2020	Vibonese	25	(6)
2020–2022	Avellino	34	(5)
2021–2022	→ Teramo (loan)	37	(8)
2022–2023	Crotone	6	(0)
2023	→ Carrarese (loan)	13	(2)
2023–2024	Giugliano	16	(1)
2024	→ Gubbio (loan)	14	(3)
2024–2025	Altamura	0	(0)
2024–2025	→ Picerno (loan)	19	(4)
2025–2026	Guidonia	19	(4)
2026–	Monopoli	1	(0)
- * Club domestic league appearances and goals as of 29 August 2026

Gabriele Bernardotto (born 22 April 1997) is an Italian professional footballer who plays as a forward for Serie C Group C club Monopoli.

== Club career ==
On 18 August 2021, he joined Teramo on loan.

On 1 September 2022, he joined Crotone outright. On 13 January 2023, Bernardotto was loaned by Carrarese.

On 25 August 2023, Bernardotto signed a two-year contract with Giugliano.

== Career statistics ==
=== Club ===
As of match played 3 April 2022

Appearances and goals by club, season and competition
Club	Season	League			National Cup		Other		Total	
Club	Season	Division	Apps	Goals	Apps	Goals	Apps	Goals	Apps	Goals
Lupa Roma	2015–16	Lega Pro	1	0	—		—		1	0
Anzio Calcio 1924	2016–17	Serie D	29	5	—		—		29	5
Trastevere	2017–18	Serie D	27	7	1	0	2 (Note: Appearance(s) in Serie D Playoffs)	0	30	7
Lanusei	2018–19	Serie D	34	15	—		3 (Note: Two appearances in Coppa Italia Serie D, one appearance in Serie D Playoffs)	0	37	15
Vibonese	2019–20	Serie C	27	6	—		1 (Note: Two appearances in Coppa Italia Serie C)	0	28	6
Avellino	2020–21	Serie C	34	5	1	0	5 (Note: Appearance(s) in Serie C Playoffs)	0	40	5
Avellino	2021–22	Serie C	0	0	1	0	0	0	1	0
Avellino	Total		34	5	2	0	5	0	41	5
Teramo (loan)	2021–22	Serie C	34	8	0	0	0	0	34	8
Career total			186	44	3	0	11	0	200	44
