= Federico Papini =

Italian footballer

Personal information
- Date of birth: 24 November 1999 (age 26)
- Place of birth: Florence, Italy
- Height: 1.85 m (6 ft 1 in)
- Position: Right back

Team information
- Current team: Campobasso
- Number: 2

Youth career
- ChievoVerona

Senior career*
Years	Team	Apps	(Gls)
–2017	Tuttocuoio		
2017–2019	Sangiovannese	55	(1)
2019–2022	Lucchese	53	(3)
2022–2024	Crotone	31	(0)
2024–2025	Picerno	9	(0)
2025–	Campobasso	32	(0)
- * Club domestic league appearances and goals as of 30 April 2026

Federico Papini (born 24 November 1999) is an Italian professional footballer who plays as a right back for Serie C Group B club Campobasso.

== Club career ==
In August 2019, he joined Serie D club Lucchese. Lucchese won the Group A this season, and was promoted to Serie C. Papini made his professional debut on 19 October 2020 against Como.

On 24 August 2022 he joined Crotone on a two-year contract.

On 31 July 2024, Papini signed a two-year deal with Picerno.
