= Edoardo Vona =

Italian footballer (born 1996)

Personal information
- Date of birth: 16 December 1996 (age 29)
- Place of birth: Rome, Italy
- Height: 1.89 m (6 ft 2 in)
- Position: Centre-back

Team information
- Current team: Triestina
- Number: 3

Youth career
- Latina Calcio
- –2014: Santarcangelo
- 2014: → Cremonese (loan)

Senior career*
Years	Team	Apps	(Gls)
2014–2015	Virtus Verona	24	(1)
2015–2016	Ribelle	3	(0)
2016–2017	Racing Roma	15	(0)
2017	Latina	6	(0)
2017–2018	US Tortolì	16	(2)
2018	Igea 1946	12	(1)
2018–2020	Castrovillari	44	(2)
2020–2021	Bisceglie	26	(0)
2021–2022	Imolese	28	(0)
2022–2023	Taranto	8	(0)
2023	Recanatese	8	(1)
2023–2024	Casarano	17	(0)
2024–2025	Latina	42	(1)
2025–2026	Pontedera	14	(1)
2026	→ Caratese (loan)	9	(0)
2026–	Triestina	0	(0)
- * Club domestic league appearances and goals as of 25 June 2026

Edoardo Vona (born 16 December 1996) is an Italian professional footballer who plays as a centre-back for Serie D club Triestina.

== Club career ==
Born in Rome, Vona started his career on Latina Calcio and Santarcangelo youth sector.

After two season for Serie D clubs Virtus Verona and Ribelle, in 2016 he joined to Lega Pro club Latina Calcio. Vona made his professional debut on 28 August 2016 against Livorno.

On 9 December 2017, he signed with US Tortolì.

On 18 August 2020, Vona joined Serie D club Bisceglie. He left the club in August 2020.

On 8 August 2021, he returned to Serie C and signed with Imolese.

On 9 August 2022, Vona moved to Taranto. On 24 January 2023, he was released by Taranto to join Recanatese.

== Personal life ==
His father Maurizio was also a footballer.
