= Kevin Candellori =

Italian footballer

Personal information
- Date of birth: 7 July 1996 (age 30)
- Place of birth: Ascoli Piceno, Italy
- Height: 1.75 m (5 ft 9 in)
- Position: Midfielder

Team information
- Current team: Sambenedettese
- Number: 18

Youth career
- Ascoli

Senior career*
Years	Team	Apps	(Gls)
2014–2015	Porto D'Ascoli	41	(7)
2015–2018	Sambenedettese	29	(2)
2018–2019	Notaresco	37	(6)
2019–2022	Campobasso	92	(14)
2022–2023	Fidelis Andria	37	(2)
2023–2024	Potenza	32	(2)
2024–	Sambenedettese	58	(4)
- * Club domestic league appearances and goals as of 30 April 2026

Kevin Candellori (born 7 July 1996) is an Italian professional footballer who plays as a midfielder for Serie C Group B club Sambenedettese.

== Career ==
Born in Ascoli Piceno, Candellori started his career in Ascoli youth sector. As a senior, he joined to Eccellenza club SSD Porto D'Ascoli.

In December 2015, he moved to Sambenedettese. With the club, he won the promotion in 2015–16 Serie D. Candellori made his professional debut on 10 September 2016 against Mantova. After three years in the club, he returned to Serie D and joined to Notaresco.

On 10 July 2019, he moved to Serie D club Campobasso.

On 27 August 2022, Candellori signed with Fidelis Andria.

On 17 August 2023, Candellori moved to Potenza on a one-season contract.
