= Orazio Pannitteri =

Italian footballer

Personal information
- Date of birth: 17 August 1999 (age 27)
- Place of birth: Catania, Italy
- Height: 1.74 m (5 ft 9 in)
- Position: Winger

Team information
- Current team: Siracusa (on loan from Latina)
- Number: 10

Youth career
- Catania

Senior career*
Years	Team	Apps	(Gls)
2017–2019	Catania	0	(0)
2017–2018	→ Acireale (loan)	27	(2)
2018–2019	→ AC Locri (loan)	29	(3)
2019–2021	Vis Pesaro	22	(3)
2021–2022	Fermana	35	(10)
2022–2024	Crotone	29	(2)
2024	→ Pro Vercelli (loan)	12	(0)
2024–2025	Lumezzane	34	(4)
2025–	Latina	12	(0)
2026–	→ Siracusa (loan)	5	(0)
- * Club domestic league appearances and goals as of 1 May 2026

Orazio Pannitteri (born 17 August 1999) is an Italian professional footballer who plays as a winger for Serie D club Siracusa, on loan from Latina.

== Club career ==
Born in Catania, Pannitteri started his career on local club Athena Club Paternò and after in Catania. He don't get made a first debut, and was loaned to Acireale and AC Locri in Serie D.

In 2019, he joined Serie C club Vis Pesaro. Pannitteri made his professional debut on 29 September 2019 against Triestina. He extended his contract in June 2020.

On 31 August 2021, he was transfer to Fermana.

On 4 August 2022, he moved to Crotone on a three-year contract. On 16 January 2024, Pannitteri was loaned by Pro Vercelli.

On 17 July 2024, Pannitteri signed a two-year contract with Lumezzane.

== Personal life ==
He is the son of former footballer Ciccio Pannitteri.
