= Eugenio D'Ursi =

Italian footballer (born 1995)

Personal information
- Date of birth: 7 May 1995 (age 31)
- Place of birth: Naples, Italy
- Height: 1.75 m (5 ft 9 in)
- Position: Forward

Team information
- Current team: Salernitana
- Number: 11

Senior career*
Years	Team	Apps	(Gls)
2013–2016	Aversa Normanna	44	(5)
2015	→ Marcianise (loan)	16	(2)
2016–2018	Arezzo	25	(3)
2018	Bisceglie	13	(7)
2018–2019	Catanzaro	33	(14)
2019–2023	Napoli	0	(0)
2019–2021	→ Bari (loan)	51	(10)
2021–2022	→ Pescara (loan)	38	(5)
2022–2023	→ Foggia (loan)	15	(1)
2023–2025	Crotone	55	(4)
2024–2025	→ Gubbio (loan)	31	(3)
2025–2026	Sorrento	35	(15)
2026–	Salernitana	2	(0)
- * Club domestic league appearances and goals as of 29 August 2026

Eugenio D'Ursi (born 7 May 1995) is an Italian professional footballer who plays as a forward for Serie C Group C club Salernitana.

== Club career ==
He made his professional debut in Lega Pro for Aversa Normanna in the 2014–15 season and spent the first seven seasons of his senior career in Serie C and Serie D.

In July 2019, his rights were bought by Serie A club Napoli. On 30 July 2019, Napoli loaned him to Serie C club Bari on a 2-year term.

On 3 August 2021, he joined Pescara on loan. On 22 August 2022, D'Ursi was loaned to Foggia, with an option to buy.

On 6 January 2023, D'Ursi signed with Crotone.
