= Umberto Saracco =

Italian footballer

Personal information
- Date of birth: 10 April 1994 (age 32)
- Place of birth: Moncalieri, Italy
- Height: 1.90 m (6 ft 3 in)
- Position: Goalkeeper

Team information
- Current team: Pontedera
- Number: 40

Youth career
- –2014: Torino

Senior career*
Years	Team	Apps	(Gls)
2014–2022	Cosenza	53	(0)
2022	Fidelis Andria	16	(0)
2022–2025	Cerignola	55	(0)
2023–2024	→ Lecco (loan)	13	(0)
2026–	Pontedera	10	(0)
- * Club domestic league appearances and goals as of 30 April 2026

Umberto Saracco (born 10 April 1994) is an Italian professional footballer who plays as a goalkeeper for Serie D club Pontedera.

== Career ==
He is a product of Torino youth teams and played for the club's Under-19 squad in the 2012–13 and 2013–14 seasons.

He joined Serie C club Cosenza before the 2014–15 season. He made his Serie C debut for Cosenza on 20 September 2014 in a game against Lupa Roma. He extended his Cosenza contract twice.

On 17 January 2022, he signed with Fidelis Andria.

On 16 July 2022, he moved to Audace Cerignola.

On 30 August 2023, he joined Lecco on loan.

== Honours ==
Cosenza

- Coppa Italia Serie C: 2014–15
