= Filippo Marenco =

Italian footballer (born 2003)

Personal information
- Date of birth: 9 April 2003 (age 23)
- Place of birth: Bologna, Italy
- Height: 1.87 m (6 ft 2 in)
- Position: Centre-back

Team information
- Current team: Latina
- Number: 13

Youth career
- –2020: Bologna
- 2020–2021: Fiorentina

Senior career*
Years	Team	Apps	(Gls)
2021–2022	→ Viterbese (loan)	13	(0)
2022–2023	Viterbese	13	(0)
2023–2024	Ancona	21	(0)
2024–	Latina	56	(1)
- * Club domestic league appearances and goals as of 1 May 2026

Filippo Marenco (born 9 April 2003) is an Italian professional footballer who plays as a centre-back for Serie C Group B club Latina.

== Club career ==
Born in Bologna, Marenco came through his home-town club's youth ranks, before joining Fiorentina's academy in October 2020.

After one season with Fiorentina's under-18 team, on 13 July 2021 he joined Serie C side Viterbese on a season-long loan. He made his professional debut for the club on 15 September 2021, coming on as a substitute for Domenico Alberico in a 3–1 home cup win over Turris. He then made his Serie C debut only four days later, starting in a game against Cesena. Having become a regular member of Viterbese's first team throughout the 2021–22 campaign, he joined the club on a permanent basis in the summer of 2022.

Marenco kept featuring regularly during the 2022–23 season, although Viterbese eventually got relegated to Serie D, having finished second-to-bottom of their group's league table.

On 4 July 2023, Marenco joined Serie C side Ancona on a free transfer, signing a two-year contract with the club.
