= Stadio Alberto De Cristofaro =

Football stadium in Giugliano, Naples, Italy

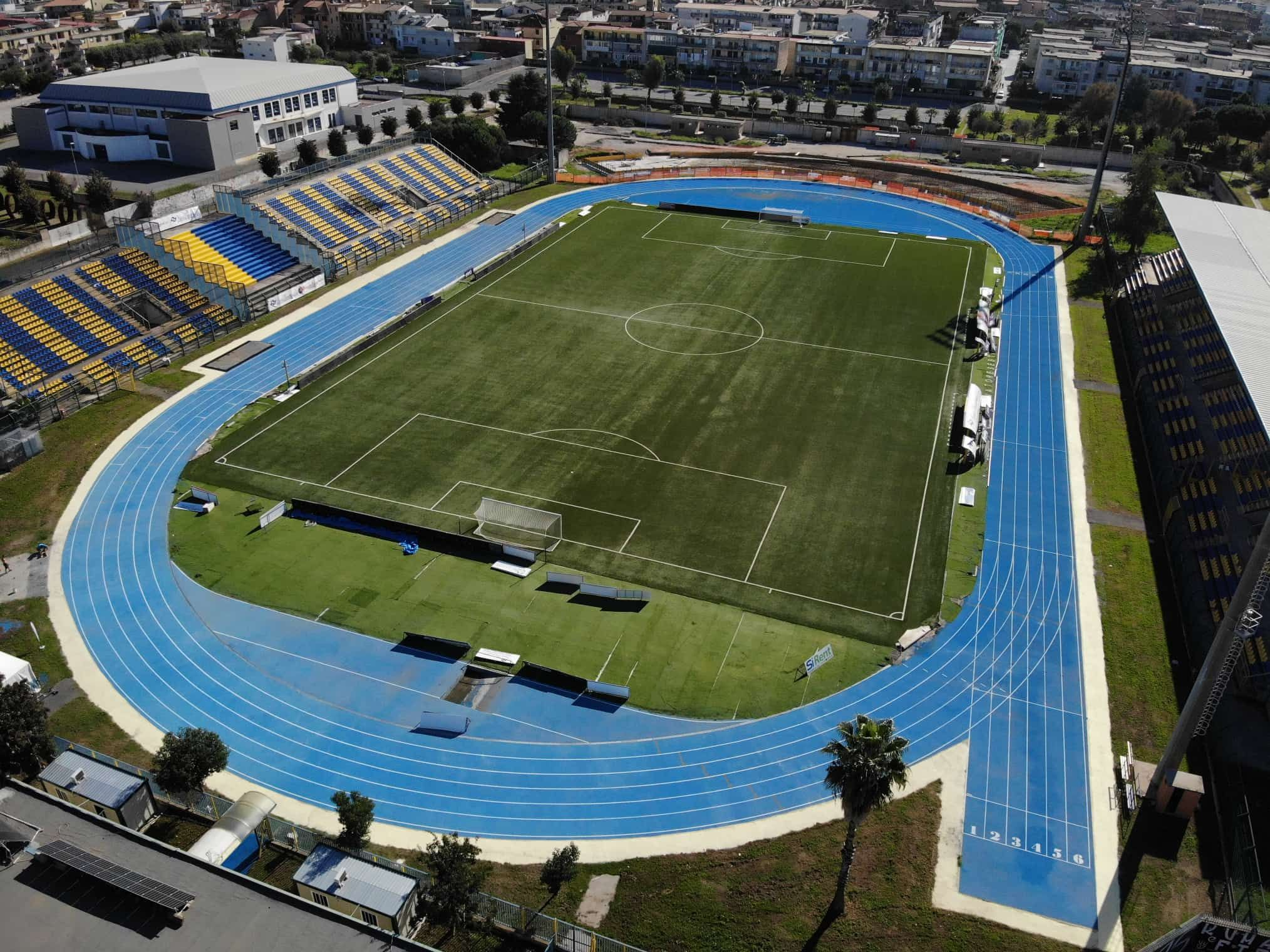
- Interactive map of Stadio Alberto De Cristofaro
- Location: Giugliano in Campania, Metropolitan City of Naples, Campania, Italy
- Coordinates: 40.927509°N 14.172216°E
- Owner: Comune di Giugliano
- Capacity: 7,030
- Surface: Grass
- Field size: 105 m × 65 m (344 ft × 213 ft)

Construction
- Groundbreaking: 1999
- Built: 2000
- Opened: 31 August 2000
- Renovated: 2018–2020, 2022–2023, 2024
- Architect: Guglielmo Pirozzi

Tenant
- Giugliano Calcio 1928 (2000–present)

Stadio Alberto De Cristofaro is a stadium in Giugliano in Campania, in the Metropolitan City of Naples, which hosts the home matches of Giugliano Calcio. It was completed in 2000.

== History ==
The stadium, named after a former forward of the local football team, was inaugurated on 31 August 2000 with a friendly match against SSC Napoli, replacing the old homonymous municipal stadium, located in the city centre and later demolished.

In January 2006, the venue hosted the Coppa Italia Serie C match SSC Napoli-Teramo Calcio. In June, during the event "Giugliano cuore grande", it also hosted Diego Maradona, who took part in a charity match held on that occasion.

=== Renovation ===
The stadium was unusable for more than six years. The last match before restoration was played on 28 April 2013. During that period, the local team played its home matches at the Stadio Alberto Vallefuoco in Mugnano di Napoli. Renovation works were carried out between 2018 and 2019. Giugliano returned to play at its stadium on 19 January 2020, hosting the remaining seven home matches of the 2019–20 Serie D season.

The renovation included the relaying of the pitch, installation of a video surveillance system, removal of the athletics track surface, replacement of seats in the central stand, and safety upgrades for the away sector.

In 2022, following Giugliano's promotion to Serie C, further works were required to meet the requirements of the Lega Pro, including new lighting and surveillance systems, installation of seats in both stands, and FIFA Quality PRO certification for the pitch. During this period, the team played home matches for the 2022–23 season at the Stadio Partenio-Adriano Lombardi in Avellino. In June 2023, the stadium obtained usability certification from the Italian Football Federation.

In June 2024, works began on the reconstruction of the curva.

== Capacity ==
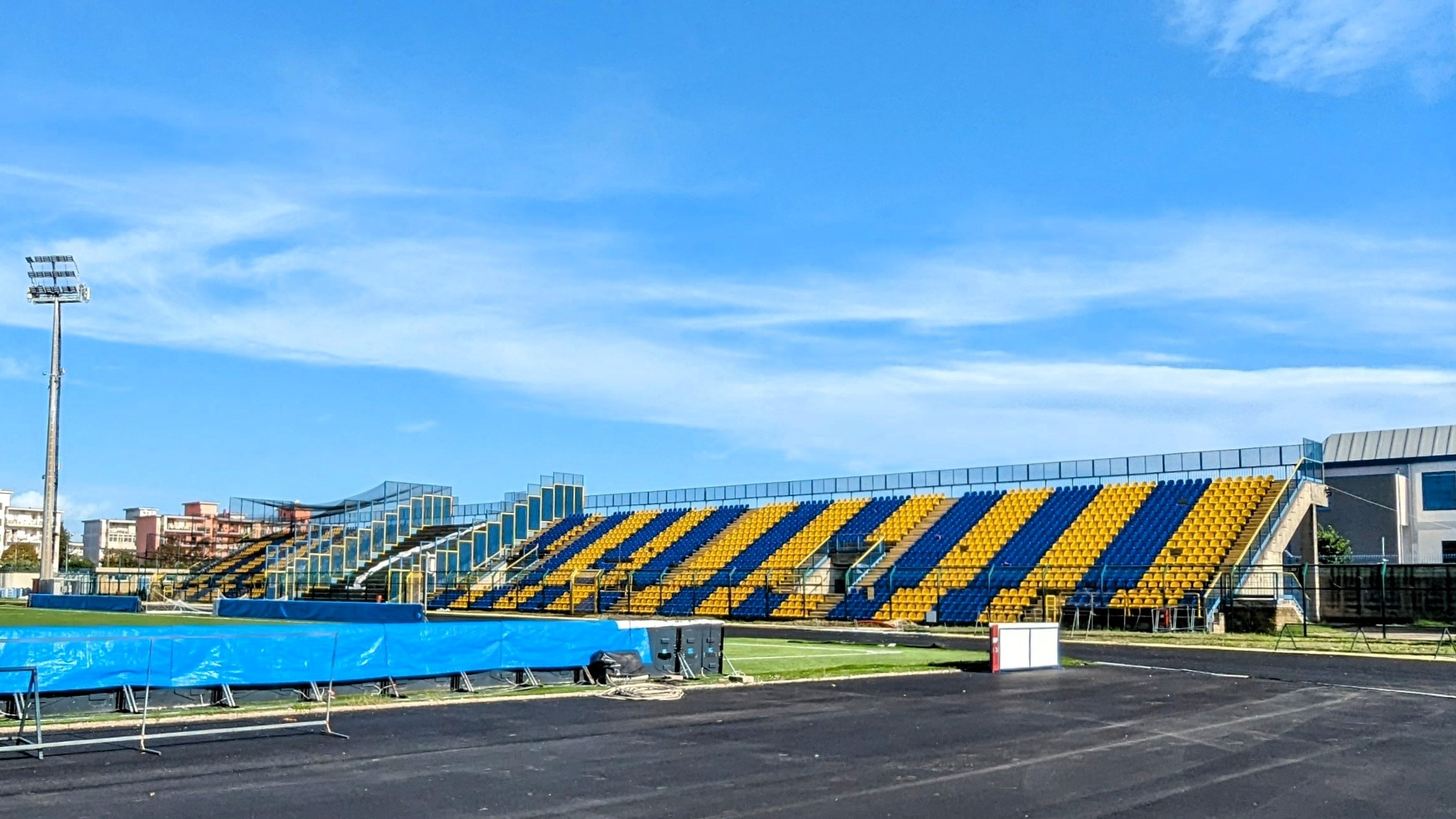
East stand "Giustino Barretta"

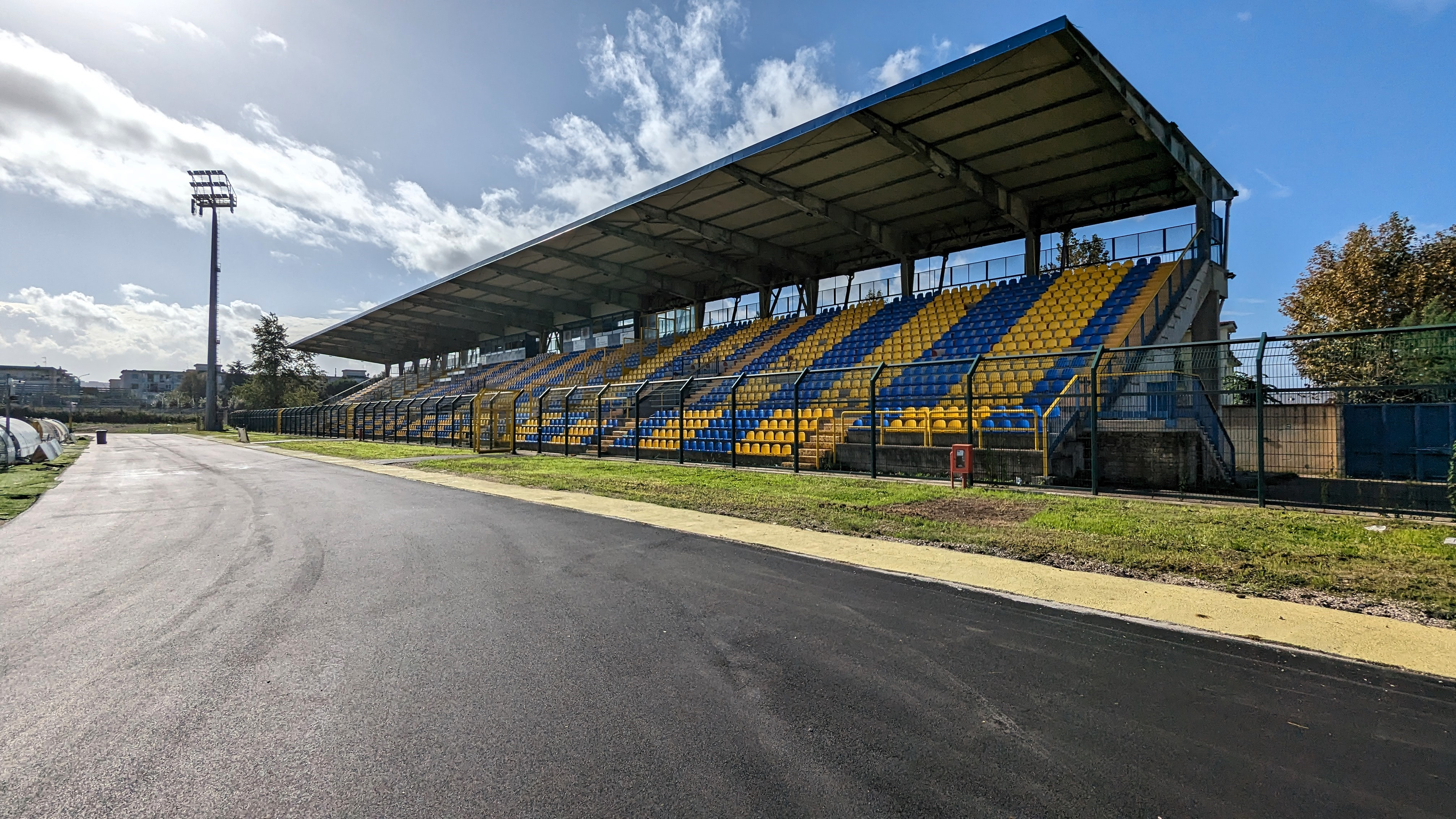
West stand "Salvatore Sestile"

At inauguration, the capacity was about 9,000 seats. In 2021, the stadium was approved to host 7,030 spectators.

It features two reinforced concrete stands along the long sides of the pitch, one of which is covered, and a terrace along the short side, adjacent to the south curve of the athletics track.

- West Stand: 3,322 covered seats, divided into three sectors, two lateral (956 seats each) and one central (1,410 seats)
- East Stand: 3,708 uncovered seats, divided between the "Distinti" sector (2,752 seats) and the away sector (956 seats)
- South Terrace: under reconstruction since 2024 (an additional 1,500 seats)

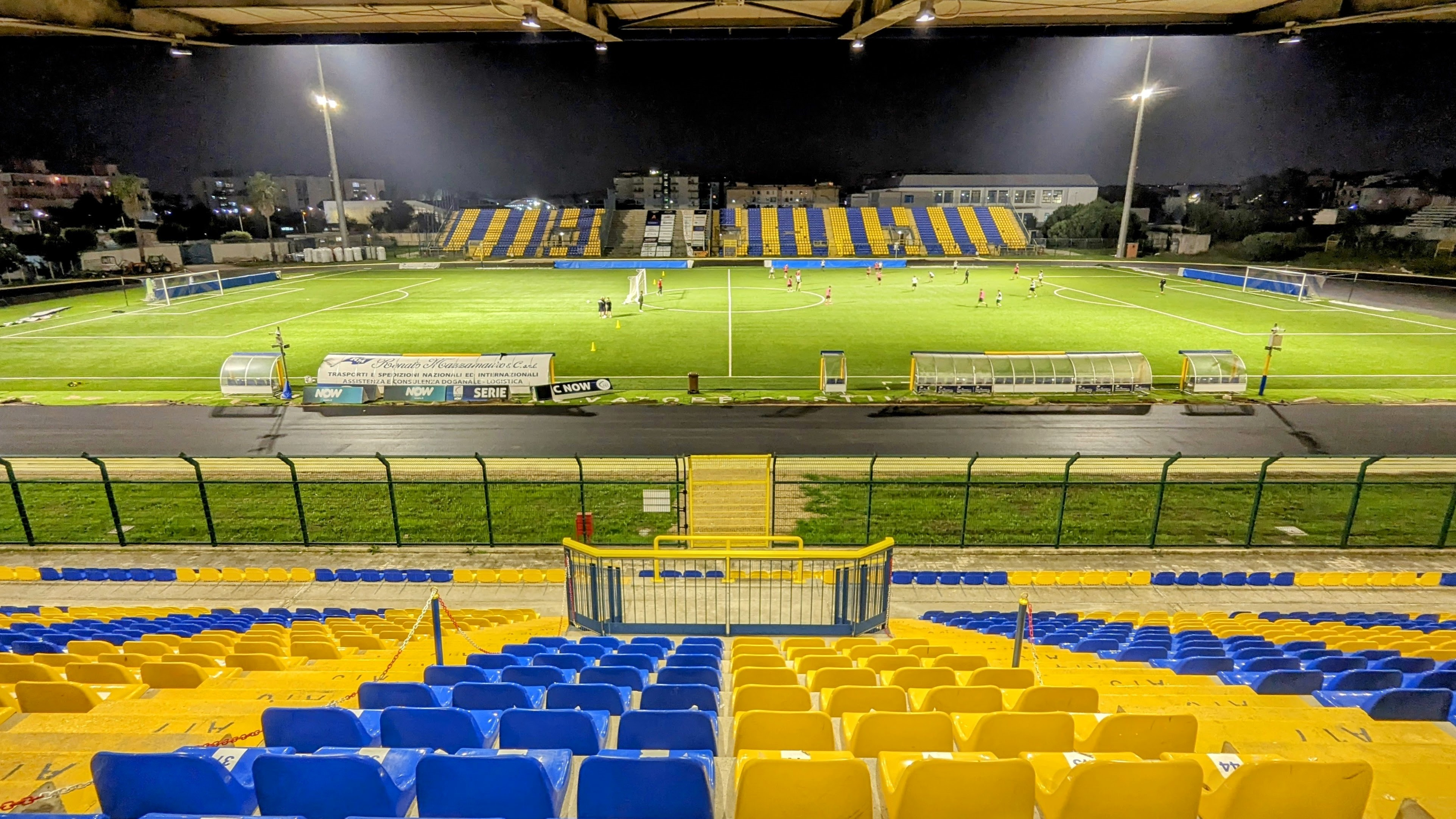
Night view of the central stand.

In 2021, the west stand was named after the late Giugliano Calcio president Salvatore Sestile, who died in 2019 after a long illness, while the east stand was named after supporter Giustino Barretta, who died prematurely in 2015.

== Transport ==
The stadium is located a few kilometres from the "Giugliano-Parete-Villaricca" exit of the Strada statale 162 NC Asse Mediano and the Circumvallazione Esterna di Napoli. Nearby there are several bus stops operated by Gepatour and EAV. In particular, it can be reached from Naples via the EAV bus line 918, departing from Frullone station on Line 1 of Naples Metro.

== Bibliography ==
- Buonanno, Paolo (2013). 85 anni di calcio a Giugliano, Una storia in gialloblu (in Italian). Giugliano in Campania: Abbiabbè. p. 17.

== See also ==
- Giugliano Calcio 1928
