= Antonio Granata =

Italian footballer (born 1997)

Personal information
- Date of birth: 20 January 1997 (age 29)
- Place of birth: Naples, Italy
- Height: 1.86 m (6 ft 1 in)
- Position: Centre-back

Team information
- Current team: Savoia

Youth career
- –2017: Napoli

Senior career*
Years	Team	Apps	(Gls)
2017–2018	Napoli	0	(0)
2017–2018	→ Sicula Leonzio (loan)	2	(0)
2018	AV Ercolanese	12	(0)
2018–2019	Rotonda Calcio	11	(0)
2019	Palmese	9	(0)
2019–2020	Nocerina	5	(1)
2020	Nola	1	(0)
2021–2022	Scafatese		
2022	Pomigliano		
2022–	Savoia		
- * Club domestic league appearances and goals as of 18:20, 28 May 2023 (UTC)

Antonio Granata (born 20 January 1997) is an Italian football player. He plays for Savoia in the Eccellenza.

== Club career ==
He made his Serie C debut for Sicula Leonzio on 21 January 2018 in a game against Trapani.

He joined Serie D club SSCD Granata 1924 (also known as AV Erconalese) on 18 August 2018.
