= Marco Carraro =

Italian footballer (born 1998)

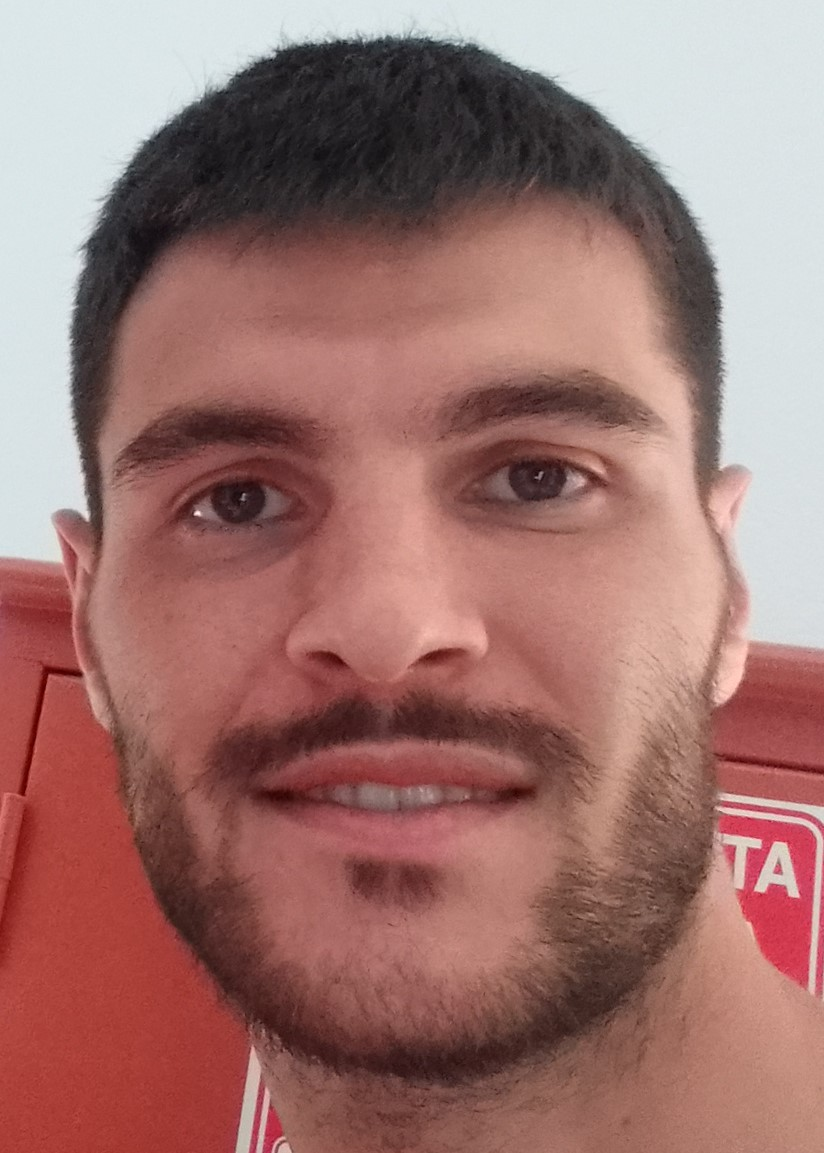

Personal information
- Date of birth: 9 January 1998 (age 28)
- Place of birth: Dolo, Italy
- Height: 1.90 m (6 ft 3 in)
- Position: Midfielder

Team information
- Current team: Vicenza
- Number: 4

Youth career
- –2014: Padova
- 2014–2017: Inter Milan

Senior career*
Years	Team	Apps	(Gls)
2017–2018	Inter Milan	0	(0)
2017–2018	→ Pescara (loan)	22	(0)
2018–2023	Atalanta	0	(0)
2018–2019	→ Foggia (loan)	14	(0)
2019–2020	→ Perugia (loan)	45	(1)
2020–2021	→ Frosinone (loan)	21	(0)
2021–2022	→ Cosenza (loan)	35	(2)
2022–2023	→ Crotone (loan)	24	(1)
2023–2024	SPAL	27	(0)
2024–	Vicenza	61	(3)

International career^{‡}
2013	Italy U15	4	(0)
2013	Italy U16	1	(0)
2017	Italy U20	2	(0)
2019–2020	Italy U21	8	(0)
- * Club domestic league appearances and goals as of 29 April 2026 ‡ National team caps and goals as of 8 September 2020

Marco Carraro (born 9 January 1998) is an Italian professional footballer who plays as a midfielder for Serie B club Vicenza.

== Club career ==
=== Inter Milan ===
==== Loan to Pescara ====
On 1 July 2017, Carraro was signed by Serie B side Pescara on a season-long loan deal. On 6 August, Carraro made his professional debut for Pescara in a 5–3 home win over Triestina in the second round of Coppa Italia, he was replaced by Mamadou Coulibaly in the 46th minute. On 8 September, Carraro made his Serie B debut for Pescara, as a substitute replacing Mattia Proietti in the 76th minute of a 3–3 home draw against Frosinone. On 28 October, Carraro played his first match as a starter for Pescara, a 3–0 home defeat against Brescia, he was replaced by Luca Valzania in the 68th minute. On 3 November he played his first entire match for Pescara, a 2–2 home draw against Palermo. Carraro ended his season-long loan to Pescara with 24 appearances and 1 assist.

=== Atalanta ===
On 30 June 2018, Carraro was transferred to Serie A team Atalanta, however Inter Milan reserved the right to buy him back.

==== Loan to Foggia and Perugia ====
On 23 July 2018, Carraro was signed by Serie B club Foggia on a season-long loan deal. On 5 August he made his debut for Foggia in a 3–1 home defeat against Catania in the second round of Coppa Italia, he played the entire match. On 26 August he made his Serie B debut for Foggia in a 4–2 home win over Carpi, he played the entire match. In January 2019, Carraro was re-called to Atalanta leaving Foggia with 15 appearances, including 12 as a starter and 1 assist.

On 24 January 2019, Carraro was loaned to Serie B club Perugia on a 6-month loan deal. On 27 February he made his debut for the club in a 3–2 away win over Venezia, he played the entire match. On 30 March he scored his first professional goal in the 49th minute of a 3–1 home win over Livorno. Carraro ended his 6-moth loan to Perugia with 12 appearances, all as a starter, and 1 goal.

==== Loan to Perugia ====
On 15 July 2019, Carraro returned to Perugia with a season-long loan deal. On 11 August he made his season debut in a 1–0 home win over Triestina in the second round of Coppa Italia, he played the entire match. Two weeks later, on 25 August he made his league debut for the club, a 2–1 home win over ChievoVerona, he played against the entire match.

==== Loan to Frosinone ====
On 5 October 2020 he was loaned to Frosinone in Serie B.

==== Loan to Cosenza ====
On 18 August 2021, he moved on loan to Cosenza.

==== Loan to Crotone ====
On 1 September 2022, Carraro joined Crotone on loan with a conditional obligation to buy.

=== Vicenza ===
On 25 July 2024, Carraro signed a two-season contract with Vicenza.

== International career ==
Carraro represented Italy at Under-15, Under16 and Under20 level. On 30 April 2013 he made his debut at U-15 level in a 0–0 home draw against United States U15, he was replaced by Dario Scudieri in the 31st minute. On 30 August 2013, Carraro made his debut at U-16 level as a substitute replacing Lorenzo Grossi in the 41st minute of a 3–0 home win over Qatar U17. On 5 October 2017 he made his debut at U-20 level as a substitute replacing Gaetano Castrovilli in the 81st minute of a 5–1 home defeat against England U20. On 10 October, Carraro played his first match as a starter in Italy U-20, a 4–2 away defeat against Portugal U20, he was replaced by Giulio Maggiore in the 68th minute.

He made his debut with the Italy U21 on 6 September 2019, in a friendly match won 4–0 against Moldova.

== Career statistics ==
=== Club ===
As of 17 September 2019

Club	Season	League			Cup		Europe		Other		Total	
Club	Season	Division	Apps	Goals	Apps	Goals	Apps	Goals	Apps	Goals	Apps	Goals
Pescara (loan)	2017–18	Serie B	22	0	2	0	—		—		24	0
Foggia (loan)	2018–19	Serie B	14	0	1	0	—		—		15	0
Perugia (loan)	2018–19	Serie B	11	1	—		—		1 (Note: All appearance(s) in Serie B play-off.)	0	12	1
Perugia (loan)	2019–20	Serie B	3	0	2	0	—		—		5	0
Career total			50	0	3	0	—		1	0	54	0

== Honours ==
=== Club ===
Inter Primavera

- Campionato Nazionale Primavera: 2016–17
