= Alessandro Garattoni =

Italian footballer (born 1998)

Personal information
- Date of birth: 23 January 1998 (age 28)
- Place of birth: Cesena, Italy
- Height: 1.80 m (5 ft 11 in)
- Position: Defender

Team information
- Current team: AlbinoLeffe
- Number: 7

Youth career
- Cesena

Senior career*
Years	Team	Apps	(Gls)
2017–2018	Cesena	0	(0)
2017–2018	→ Imolese (loan)	34	(2)
2018–2020	Crotone	0	(0)
2018–2020	→ Imolese (loan)	35	(0)
2020–2021	Juve Stabia	31	(2)
2021–2024	Foggia	71	(9)
2024–2025	Virtus Entella	10	(0)
2025–	AlbinoLeffe	31	(1)
- * Club domestic league appearances and goals as of 30 April 2026

Alessandro Garattoni (born 23 January 1998) is an Italian professional footballer who plays as a defender for Serie C Group A club AlbinoLeffe.

== Career ==
He made his Serie C debut for Imolese on 18 September 2018 in a game against AlbinoLeffe.

On 3 October 2020, he joined Juve Stabia.

On 30 July 2021, he signed a two-year contract with Foggia.

On 24 January 2024, Garattoni moved to Virtus Entella.
