= Alessio Tribuzzi =

Italian footballer (born 1998)

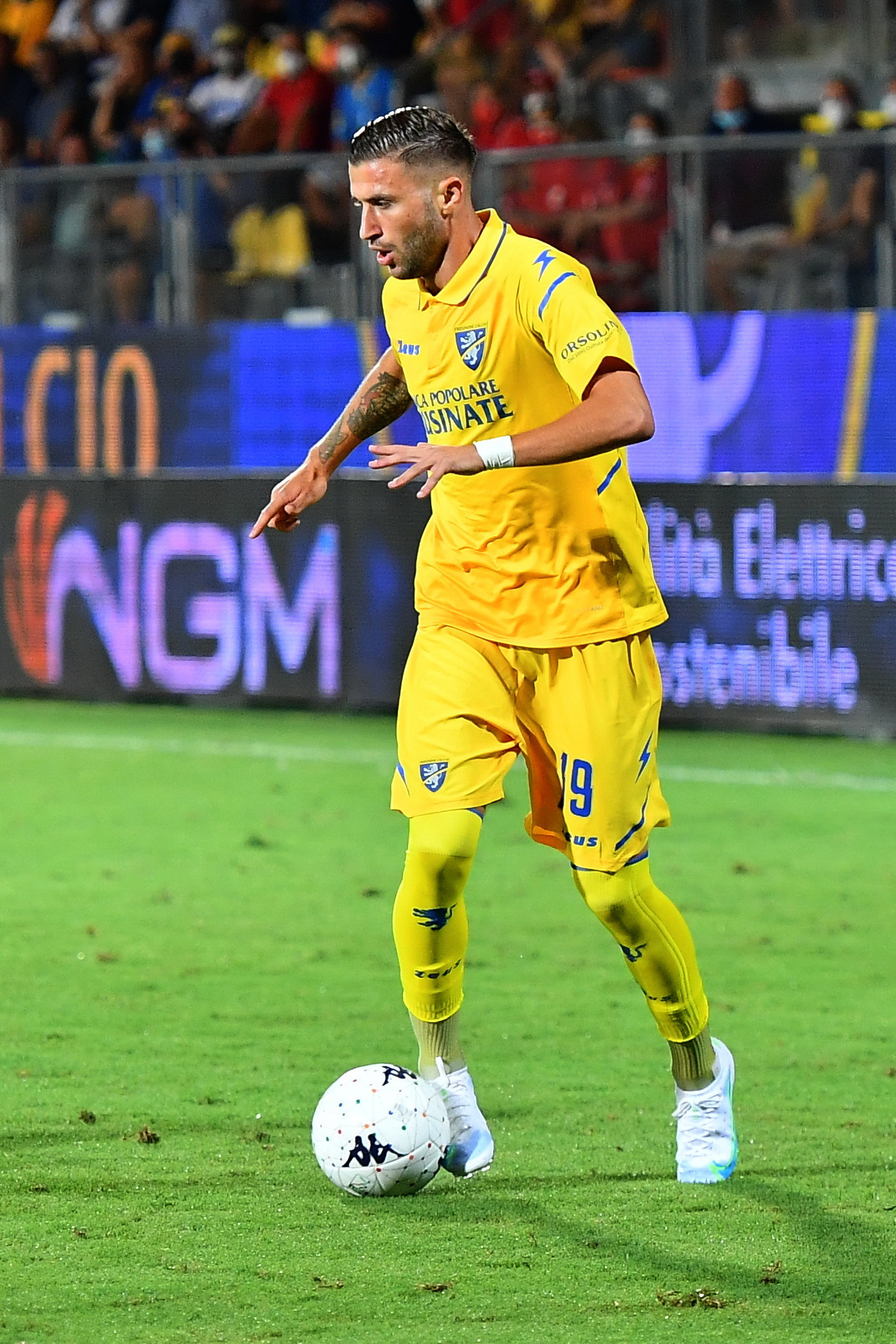
- Tribuzzi with Frosinone in 2021

Personal information
- Date of birth: 19 November 1998 (age 27)
- Place of birth: Rome, Italy
- Height: 1.83 m (6 ft 0 in)
- Position: Midfielder

Team information
- Current team: Bari (on loan from Avellino)
- Number: 11

Youth career
- Atletico 2000
- –2015: Roma
- 2015–2017: Frosinone

Senior career*
Years	Team	Apps	(Gls)
2017–2022	Frosinone	62	(0)
2017–2018	→ Latina (loan)	33	(2)
2018–2019	→ Avellino (loan)	35	(11)
2022–2024	Crotone	73	(6)
2024–	Avellino	13	(0)
2025–2026	→ Vicenza (loan)	25	(1)
2026–	→ Bari (loan)	1	(0)
- * Club domestic league appearances and goals as of 21 August 2026

Alessio Tribuzzi (born 19 November 1998) is an Italian professional footballer who plays as a midfielder for Serie C Group C club Bari, on loan from Avellino.

== Club career ==
=== Frosinone ===
He started playing for the Under-19 squad of Frosinone in the 2016–17 season. In August 2017 he was called up to the senior squad for the first time for a Coppa Italia match, but remained on the bench. He spent 2017–18 and 2018–19 seasons on loan to Serie D clubs Latina and Avellino respectively, achieving promotion to Serie C with Avellino.

On 11 August 2019, he made his first senior squad appearance and scored his first goal for Frosinone, establishing the final score of 4–0 in a Coppa Italia victory over Carrarese.

He made his Serie B debut for Frosinone on 24 September 2019 in a game against Perugia. He started the game and played for 79 minutes.

=== Crotone ===
On 3 August 2022, Tribuzzi signed a three-year contract with Crotone.
