= Luca Calapai =

Italian footballer

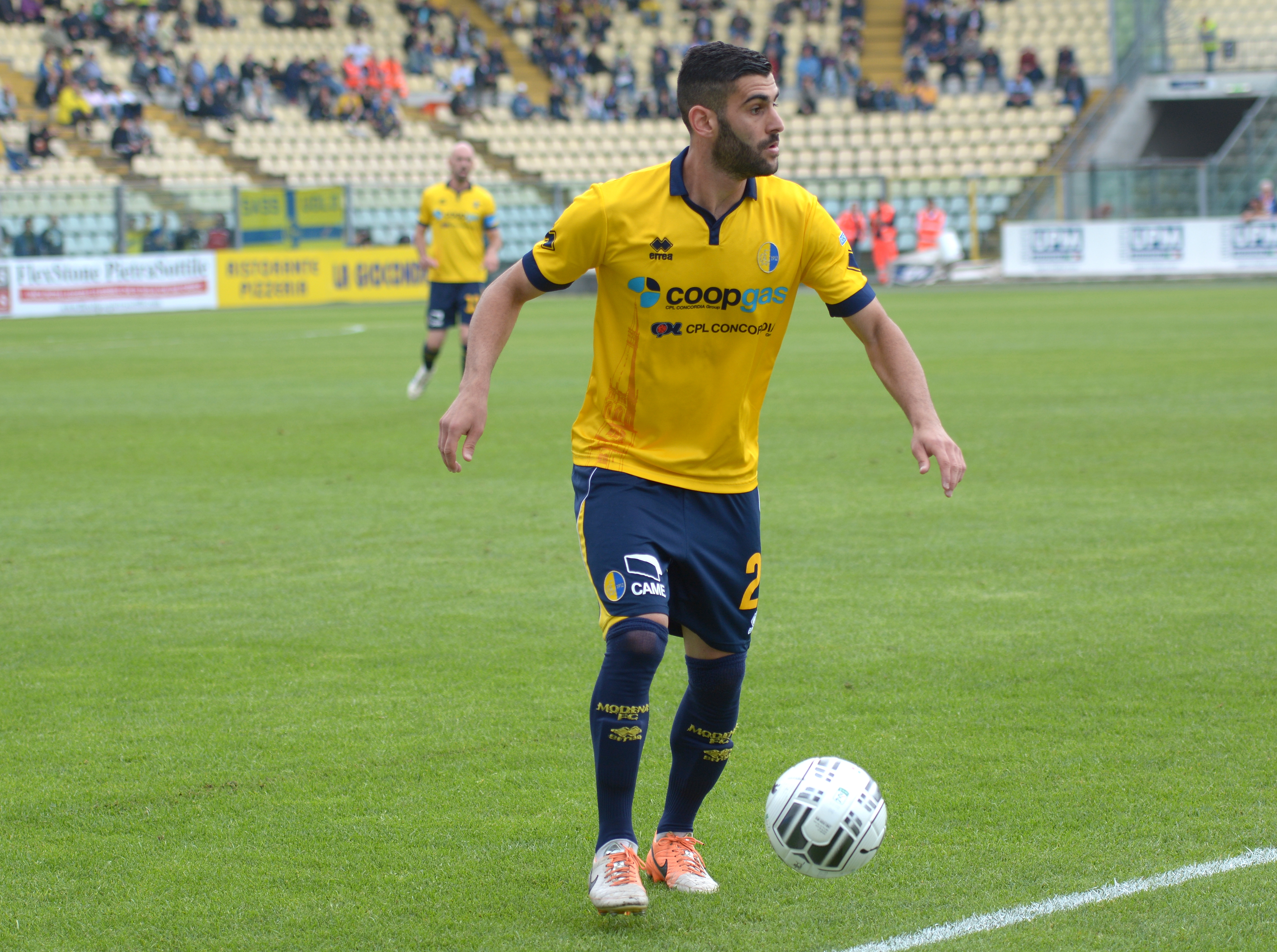

Personal information
- Date of birth: 20 May 1993 (age 33)
- Place of birth: Messina, Italy
- Height: 1.79 m (5 ft 10 in)
- Position: Defender

Youth career
- –2012: Catania

Senior career*
Years	Team	Apps	(Gls)
2011–2013	Catania	1	(0)
2012–2013	→ Barletta (loan)	27	(1)
2013–2017	Modena	96	(0)
2017–2018	Carpi	10	(0)
2018–2022	Catania	108	(5)
2022–2023	Crotone	44	(1)
2023–2024	Casertana	36	(1)
2024–2025	SPAL	33	(0)
2025–2026	Perugia	22	(0)
- * Club domestic league appearances and goals as of 30 April 2026

Luca Calapai (born 20 May 1993) is an Italian footballer.

== Club career ==
Calapai began his professional career within the youth ranks of Arcoiris, before eventually earning call-ups to the first team towards the end of the 2011-12 Serie A campaign, under former coach, Vincenzo Montella. He made his Serie A debut on 13 May 2012, as a 79th-minute substitute in a 0–2 home loss to Udinese.

On 12 July 2012, Calapai was sent out on loan to the Lega Pro Prima Divisione with S.S. Barletta Calcio. He was a first team regular for the club, making 28 appearances and scoring 1 goal during the 2012-13 statistical season. He returned to Catania on 30 June 2013.

On 1 July 2013, Calapai was officially sold to Modena F.C. on a co-ownership deal with Catania.

On 16 July 2018, he rejoined his first club Catania (which was relegated to the third-tier Serie C by then), signing a 4-year contract.

On 25 January 2022, he signed a 1.5-year contract with Serie B club Crotone.

On 28 August 2024, Calapai moved to SPAL on a two-season contract.
