= Mattia Vitale =

Italian footballer (born 1997)

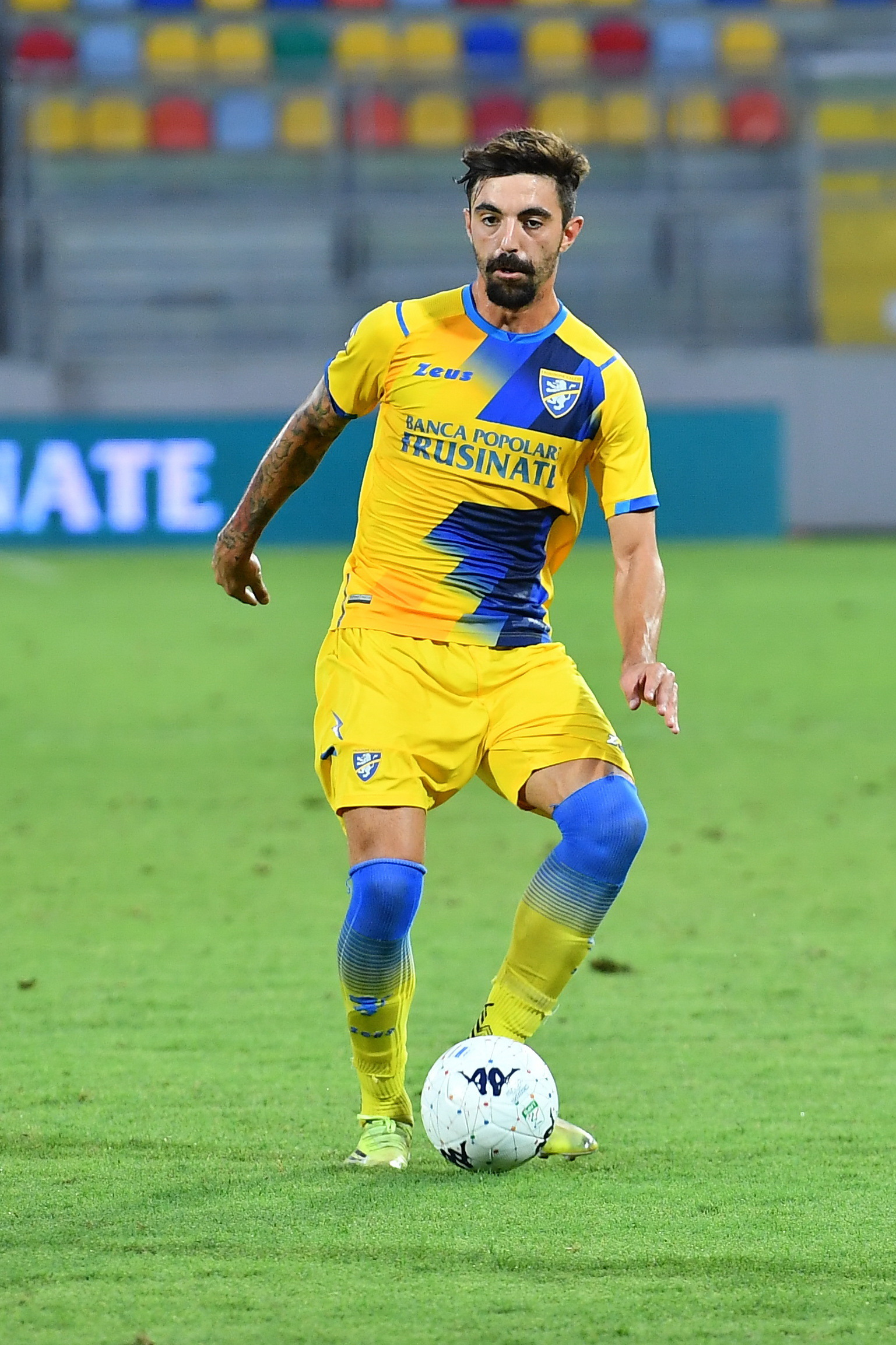
- Vitale with Frosinone in 2021

Personal information
- Full name: Mattia Vitale
- Date of birth: 1 October 1997 (age 29)
- Place of birth: Bologna, Italy
- Height: 1.83 m (6 ft 0 in)
- Position: Midfielder

Team information
- Current team: Salernitana
- Number: 32

Youth career
- 2003–2009: Persiceto85
- 2009–2011: Bologna
- 2011–2016: Juventus

Senior career*
Years	Team	Apps	(Gls)
2014–2018	Juventus	2	(0)
2016	→ Lanciano (loan)	19	(0)
2016–2017	→ Cesena (loan)	21	(0)
2017	→ Venezia (loan)	0	(0)
2017–2018	→ SPAL (loan)	2	(0)
2018–2020	SPAL	0	(0)
2019	→ Carpi (loan)	13	(1)
2019–2020	→ Frosinone (loan)	5	(0)
2020–2021	Frosinone	10	(0)
2021–2022	Pro Vercelli	34	(2)
2022–2025	Crotone	91	(7)
2025–2026	Vicenza	27	(1)
2026–	Salernitana	0	(0)

International career
2012	Italy U15	1	(0)
2013	Italy U17	3	(0)
2014	Italy U18	3	(0)
2017	Italy U20	6	(1)
Medal record
Men's football
Representing Italy
FIFA U-20 World Cup
Third place	2017 South Korea
- * Club domestic league appearances and goals as of 29 April 2026

Mattia Vitale (born 1 October 1997) is an Italian professional footballer who plays as a midfielder for Serie C Group C club Salernitana.

== Club career ==
=== Juventus ===
A native of Bologna, Vitale joined the youth set-up of local club Bologna, playing as a forward, before moving north to Turin giants Juventus in 2011. He was first included in a matchday squad on 11 January 2015, remaining an unused substitute for their 3–1 Serie A win away to Napoli. The player made his professional debut on 11 April against Parma, replacing fellow youngster Kingsley Coman for the final ten minutes of a 0–1 away defeat, becoming Juve's youngest debutant since Nicola Zanini in 1991. On 9 May, he played his first match at the Juventus Stadium, replacing Roberto Pereyra for the final 15 minutes of a 1–1 draw with Cagliari.

==== Lanciano (loan) ====
In 2016, he joined Serie B club Lanciano on a six-month loan, recording 19 league appearances and an assist.

==== Cesena (loan) ====
On 6 July 2016, Cesena announced the loan signing of Vitale from Juventus for the 2016–2017 season.

=== SPAL ===
==== Carpi (loan) ====
On 15 January 2019 he joined Carpi on loan for the rest of the 2018–19 season.

=== Frosinone ===
On 16 July 2019 he joined Frosinone on loan. As certain performance conditions were met, Frosinone was obligated to purchase his rights at the end of the 2019–20 season.

=== Pro Vercelli ===
On 31 August 2021, he joined Serie C club Pro Vercelli.

=== Crotone ===
On 19 July 2022, Vitale signed a three-year contract with Crotone.

== Honours ==
Juventus

- Supercoppa Italiana: 2015

Italy U20

- FIFA U-20 World Cup third place: 2017
