= 2019–20 Coppa Italia Serie C =

Tournament details
- Country: Italy
- Dates: 3 August 2019 – 27 June 2020
- Teams: 60

Final positions
- Champions: Juventus U23 (1st title)
- Runners-up: Ternana

Tournament statistics
- Top goal scorer: Roberto Ogunseye (4 goals)

The 2019–20 Coppa Italia Serie C was the 48th edition of the Coppa Italia Serie C, the cup competition for Serie C clubs.

Viterbese were the defending champions having won their first title in May 2019 against Monza, but were eliminated by Teramo in the round of 32. Due to the COVID-19 pandemic in Italy, the final – which was originally planned to be played in two legs in April 2020 – was played as a one-off match in June.

Juventus U23 won the competition by defeating Ternana 2–1 in the final, winning their first title.

== Participating teams ==
=== Group A (20 teams) ===
- AlbinoLeffe
- Alessandria
- Arezzo
- Carrarese
- Como
- Giana Erminio
- Gozzano
- Juventus U23
- Lecco
- Monza
- Novara
- Olbia
- Pergolettese
- Pianese
- Pistoiese
- Pontedera
- Pro Patria
- Pro Vercelli
- Renate
- Siena

=== Group B (20 teams) ===
- Arzignano
- Carpi
- Cesena
- Fano
- Feralpisalò
- Fermana
- Gubbio
- Imolese
- Modena
- Padova
- Piacenza
- Ravenna
- Reggio Audace
- Rimini
- Sambenedettese
- Südtirol
- Triestina
- L.R. Vicenza
- Virtus Verona
- Vis Pesaro

=== Group C (20 teams) ===
- Avellino
- Bari
- Bisceglie
- Casertana
- Catania
- Catanzaro
- Cavese
- Monopoli
- Paganese
- Picerno
- Potenza
- Reggina
- Rende
- Rieti
- Sicula Leonzio
- Teramo
- Ternana
- Vibonese
- Virtus Francavilla
- Viterbese

== Format and seeding ==
The 60 teams in the 2019–20 Serie C entered the competition at various stages, as follows:

- Group stage: it was attended by the 31 teams that had not participated in the Coppa Italia. The teams were divided into 11 groups, of which nine consisted of three teams and the other two of two teams. The teams met in one-way matches for the three-team groups, and in home-and-away matches in the two-team groups. The teams ranked first in their respective groups were admitted to the Final round.
- Final round: 40 teams participated, the 29 who also participated in the Coppa Italia and the 11 winners of the preliminary round. The final round was played following a knock-out format, with teams paired based on geography.
  - First round (one-legged): played by only 16 of the 40 teams, who faced each other in eight one-legged matches to reduce the number of participants to 32; the home factor was determined by drawing lots.
  - Round of 32 (one-legged): played by the eight winners of the first round and the 24 who had not played in the first round; 16 one-way matches were played, with the home factor determined by drawing lots.
  - Round of 16 (one-legged)
  - Quarter-finals (one-legged)
  - Semi-finals (two-legged)
- Final (one-legged)

With a press release from the Lega Pro, on 10 June, it was decided that the final would be played in a single match and on a neutral field. In the event of a tie at the end of regular time, extra time would be played and, in the event of a further tie, penalty shots. It was also established that the final would be played on 27 June 2020. On 20 June the Stadio Dino Manuzzi of Cesena was chosen to host the final, and it was established that it would take place at 20:45.

The winner of the tournament qualified to the third round of the 2019–20 Serie C promotion play-offs; however, if they satisfied one of the following conditions:

- already promoted to the Serie B by ranking;
- already admitted to the third round of the playoffs by ranking;
- renounced participation in the playoffs;
- finished the Serie C championship in one of the last five places (therefore either relegated directly to Serie D or qualified for the relegation play-out),

their place would be filled by the losing finalist or, alternatively, by the club ranked fourth of the Serie C group to which the cup winner belonged.

== Round dates ==
Phase	Round	First leg	Second leg
Group stage	Matchday 1	4 August 2019	
Group stage	Matchday 2	11 August 2019	
Group stage	Matchday 3	18 August 2019	
Final stage	First round	9 October 2019	
Final stage	Round of 32	6–20 November 2019	
Final stage	Round of 16	27 November 2019	
Final stage	Quarter-finals	11–18 December 2019	
Final stage	Semi-finals	29 January 2020	12–13 February 2020
Final stage	Final	27 June 2020	

== Group stage ==
=== Group A ===
Pos	Team	Pld	W	D	L	GF	GA	GD	Pts	Qualification	REN	COM	GOZ
1	Renate	2	2	0	0	5	2	+3	6	Advance to knockout phase	—	4–2	
2	Como	2	1	0	1	3	4	−1	3			—	1–0
3	Gozzano	2	0	0	2	0	2	−2	0		0–1		—

Rules for classification: Group stage tiebreakers
4 August 2019
17:00 CEST

Gozzano	0–1	Renate
	Report	Damonte 51'

Stadio Silvio Piola, Vercelli
Attendance: 250
Referee: Cherchi (Carbonia)

11 August 2019
18:00 CEST

Como	1–0	Gozzano
Marano 81'	Report

Stadio Giuseppe Sinigaglia, Como
Attendance: 1,000
Referee: Bordin (Bassano del Grappa)

18 August 2019
20:00 CEST

Renate	4–2	Como
Galuppini 12', 44'; Kabashi 38'; Plescia 85'	Report	Marano 29'; Gabrielloni 30'

Stadio Città di Meda, Meda
Referee: Delrio (Reggio Emilia)

=== Group B ===
Pos	Team	Pld	W	D	L	GF	GA	GD	Pts	Qualification	LEC	GIA	ALB
1	Lecco	2	1	0	1	3	3	0	3	Advance to knockout phase	—	1–2	
2	Giana Erminio	2	1	0	1	2	2	0	3			—	0–1
3	AlbinoLeffe	2	1	0	1	2	2	0	3		1–2		—

Rules for classification: Group stage tiebreakers
4 August 2019
16:30 CEST

Giana Erminio	0–1	AlbinoLeffe
	Report	Sibilli 13'

Stadio Comunale Città di Gorgonzola, Gorgonzola
Referee: Scarpa (Collegno)

11 August 2019
17:00 CEST

Lecco	1–2	Giana Erminio
D'Anna 82'	Report	Mutton 90+1', 90+7'

Stadio Mario Rigamonti-Mario Ceppi, Lecco
Referee: Arace (Lugo di Romagna)

18 August 2019
17:00 CEST

AlbinoLeffe	1–2	Lecco
Sibilli 35'	Report	Nichetti 45' (o.g.); Capogna 47'

Stadio Comunale Città di Gorgonzola, Gorgonzola
Referee: Frascaro (Florence)

=== Group C ===
Pos	Team	Pld	W	D	L	GF	GA	GD	Pts	Qualification	JUV	REG	PER
1	Juventus U23	2	1	1	0	5	3	+2	4	Advance to knockout phase	—		2–0
2	Reggio Audace	2	1	1	0	5	3	+2	4		3–3	—	
3	Pergolettese	2	0	0	2	0	4	−4	0			0–2	—

Rules for classification: Group stage tiebreakers
4 August 2019
20:30 CEST

Juventus U23	2–0	Pergolettese
Beruatto 17'; Touré 21'	Report

Stadio Giuseppe Moccagatta, Alessandria
Referee: Emmanuele (Pisa)

11 August 2019
17:30 CEST

Pergolettese	0–2	Reggiana
	Report	Scappini 73'; Marchi 90+1'

Stadio Giuseppe Voltini, Crema
Referee: Gallipò (Florence)

18 August 2019
18:30 CEST

Reggio Audace	3–3	Juventus U23
Marchi 10'; Scappini 54', 88'	Report	Lanini 27', 37', 69'

Stadio Giuseppe Moccagatta, Alessandria (Note: Tie reversed from the original draw)
Referee: Catanese (Reggio Calabria)

=== Group D ===
Pos	Team	Pld	W	D	L	GF	GA	GD	Pts	Qualification	PON	PIS	PIA
1	Pontedera	2	1	1	0	3	2	+1	4	Advance to knockout phase	—		1–1
2	Pistoiese	2	1	0	1	3	2	+1	3		1–2	—	
3	Pianese	2	0	1	1	1	3	−2	1			0–2	—

Rules for classification: Group stage tiebreakers
3 August 2019
20:30 CEST

Pontedera	1–1	Pianese
Tommasini 48'	Report	Benedetti 19'

Stadio Ettore Mannucci, Pontedera
Referee: Di Marco (Ciampino)

10 August 2019
20:30 CEST

Pistoiese	1–2	Pontedera
Falcone 74'	Report	Tommasini 41'; Bruzzo 84'

Stadio Ettore Mannucci, Pontedera
Referee: Petrella (Viterbo)

17 August 2019
17:30 CEST

Pianese	0–2	Pistoiese
	Report	Cerritelli 66'; Dametto 84'

Stadio Carlo Zecchini
Referee: Nicolini (Brescia)

=== Group E ===
Pos	Team	Pld	W	D	L	GF	GA	GD	Pts	Qualification	CES	PES	RIM
1	Cesena	2	2	0	0	5	2	+3	6	Advance to knockout phase	—	3–1	
2	Vis Pesaro	2	1	0	1	2	3	−1	3			—	1–0
3	Rimini	2	0	0	2	1	3	−2	0		1–2		—

Rules for classification: Group stage tiebreakers
4 August 2019
20:30 CEST

Rimini	1–2	Cesena
Petrović 86'	Report	Butić 4'; De Feudis 18'

Stadio Romeo Neri, Rimini
Referee: Zucchetti (Foligno)

11 August 2019
20:30 CEST

Cesena	3–1	Vis Pesaro
Brignani 27'; Cappellini 32'; Russini 82'	Report	Gennari 3'

Stadio Dino Manuzzi, Cesena
Referee: Scarpa (Collegno)

18 August 2019
20:30 CEST

Vis Pesaro	1–0	Rimini
Tessiore 60'	Report

Stadio Tonino Benelli, Pesaro
Referee: Caldera (Como)

=== Group F ===
Pos	Team	Pld	W	D	L	GF	GA	GD	Pts	Qualification	VIR	ARZ	MOD
1	Virtus Verona	2	1	1	0	4	2	+2	4	Advance to knockout phase	—	2–0	
2	Arzignano Valchiampo	2	1	0	1	2	3	−1	3			—	2–1
3	Modena	2	0	1	1	3	4	−1	1		2–2		—

Rules for classification: Group stage tiebreakers
10 August 2019
18:00 CEST

Modena	2–2	Virtus Verona
Odogwu 3'; Magrassi 72'	Report	De Grazia 76'; Casarotto 84' (o.g.)

Centro sportivo Mario Gavagnin-Sinibaldo Nocini, Verona
Referee: Angelucci (Fomento)

14 August 2019
18:00 CEST

Arzignano Valchiampo	2–1	Modena
Cais 23'; Barzaghi 79'	Report	Davi 30'

Stadio Romeo Menti, Vicenza
Referee: Donda (Gradisca di Isonzo)

18 August 2019
17:00 CEST

Virtus Verona	2–0	Arzignano Valchiampo
Pellacani 10'; Lupoli 85'	Report

Centro sportivo Mario Gavagnin-Sinibaldo Nocini, Verona
Referee: Giordano (Novara)

=== Group G ===
Pos	Team	Pld	W	D	L	GF	GA	GD	Pts	Qualification	TER	GUB	FAN
1	Teramo	2	2	0	0	4	1	+3	6	Advance to knockout phase	—	2–1	
2	Gubbio	2	1	0	1	7	2	+5	3			—	6–0
3	Fano	2	0	0	2	0	8	−8	0		0–2		—

Rules for classification: Group stage tiebreakers
4 August 2019
20:30 CEST

Gubbio	6–0	Fano
Battista 9'; Sbaffo 19'; Tavernelli 26'; Malaccari 46'; De Silvestro 49'; Meli 77'	Report

Stadio Pietro Barbetti, Gubbio
Referee: Centi (Viterbo)

11 August 2019
18:00 CEST

Fano	0–2	Gubbio
	Report	Cristini 10'; Minelli 58'

Stadio Raffaele Mancini, Fano
Referee: Natilla (Molfetta)

18 August 2019
20:30 CEST

Teramo	2–1	Gubbio
Mungo 12'; Minelli 20'	Report	Cesaretti 53'

Stadio Raffaele Mancini, Gubbio
Referee: Zamagni (Cesena)

=== Group H ===
Pos	Team	Pld	W	D	L	GF	GA	GD	Pts	Qualification	TER	OLB	RIE
1	Ternana	2	1	1	0	4	2	+2	4	Advance to knockout phase	—	3–2	
2	Olbia	2	1	0	1	2	3	−1	3			—	4–1
3	Rieti	2	0	1	1	3	4	−1	1		1–3		—

Rules for classification: Group stage tiebreakers
4 August 2019
20:30 CEST

Ternana	3–2	Olbia
Proietti 13'; Ferrante 49'; Paghera 87'	Report	Parigi 66'; Ogunseye 73' (pen.)

Stadio Libero Liberati, Terni
Referee: Cavaliere (Paola)

11 August 2019
19:30 CEST

Olbia	4–1	Rieti
Ogunseye 31', 60', 67' (pen.); Dorattiotto 74'	Report	Tirelli 43'

Stadio Bruno Nespoli, Olbia
Referee: Scatena (Avezzano)

18 August 2019
20:30 CEST

Rieti	1–3	Ternana
Marcheggiani 66'	Report	Proietti 35'; Salzano 51'; Partipilo 87'

Stadio Centro d'Italia-Manlio Scopigno, Rieti
Referee: Flero (Pistoia)

=== Group I ===
Pos	Team	Pld	W	D	L	GF	GA	GD	Pts	Qualification	AVE	BAR	PAG
1	Avellino	2	1	1	0	3	2	+1	4	Advance to knockout phase	—	1–0	
2	Bari	2	1	0	1	3	3	0	3			—	3–2
3	Paganese	2	0	1	1	4	5	−1	1		2–2		—

Rules for classification: Group stage tiebreakers
11 August 2019
20:30 CEST

Bari	3–2	Paganese
Kupisz 30'; Antenucci 49', 86'	Report	Diop 43'; Mattia 68'

Stadio San Nicola, Bari
Referee: Giaccaglia (Jesi)

14 August 2019
18:00 CEST

Paganese	2–2	Avellino
Diop 43' (pen.); Mattia 68'	Report	Alfageme 6'; Celjak 63'

Stadio Marcello Torre, Pagani
Referee: Acanfore (Castellamare di Stabia)

18 August 2019
17:30 CEST

Avellino	0–1	Bari
	Report	Di Paolantonio 52'

Stadio Partenio-Adriano Lombardi, Avellino
Referee: Costanza (Agrigento)

=== Group L ===
Pos	Team	Pld	W	D	L	GF	GA	GD	Pts	Qualification	SIC	VIB
1	Sicula Leonzio	2	1	0	1	4	2	+2	3	Advance to knockout phase	—	3–0
2	Vibonese	2	1	0	1	2	4	−2	3		2–1	—

Rules for classification: Group stage tiebreakers
11 August 2019
17:30 CEST

Vibonese	2–1	Sicula Leonzio
Napolitano 26'; Petermann 48'	Report	Lescano 81'

Stadio Luigi Razza, Vibo Valentia
Referee: Arena (Torre del Greco)

18 August 2019
17:30 CEST

Sicula Leonzio	3–0	Vibonese
Scardina 10'; Sicurella 68'; Lescano 79'	Report

Stadio Angelino Nobile, Lentini
Referee: Pirrona (Barcellona Pozzo di Gotto)

Sicula Leonzio won 4–2 on aggregate.

=== Group M ===
Pos	Team	Pld	W	D	L	GF	GA	GD	Pts	Qualification	BIS	AZ
1	Bisceglie	2	1	1	0	3	1	+2	4	Advance to knockout phase	—	1–1
2	AZ Picerno	2	0	1	1	1	3	−2	1		0–2	—

Rules for classification: Group stage tiebreakers
29 August 2019
20:30 CEST

AZ Picerno	0–2	Bisceglie
	Report	Gatto 59'; Montero 88'

Stadio Alfredo Viviani, Potenza
Referee: Cavaliere (Paola)

12 September 2019
20:30 CEST

Bisceglie	1–1	AZ Picerno
Manicone 75'	Report	Nappello 70'

Stadio Gustavo Ventura, Bisceglie
Referee: Repace (Perugia)

Bisceglie won 3–1 on aggregate.

== Final stage ==
=== Bracket (since round of 32) ===
Round of 32
Siena	2
Arezzo	0
Viterbese	0
Teramo	1
Avellino	2
Cavese	1
Ternana	4
Fermana	1
Catanzaro	2
Monopoli	0
Casertana	2
Bisceglie	1
Reggina	2
Potenza	3
Catania	1
Sicula Leonzio	0
Padova	1
L.R. Vicenza	4
Triestina	1
Virtus Verona	0
Feralpisalò	1
Lecco	0
Monza	2
Pro Patria (a.e.t.)	3
Ravenna	2
Cesena	4
Piacenza (p)	1 (3)
Imolese	1 (1)
Juventus U23	1
Alessandria	0
Pro Vercelli	1
Carpi	0

Round of 16
Siena	3
Teramo	1
Avellino	0
Ternana	1
Catanzaro	2
Casertana	0
Potenza	1
Catania	2
L.R. Vicenza	3
Triestina	1
Feralpisalò	3
Pro Patria	2
Cesena	1 (2)
Piacenza (p)	1 (4)
Juventus U23	2
Pro Vercelli	0

Quarter-finals
Siena	0
Ternana	1
Catanzaro	0
Catania	1
L.R. Vicenza	0
Feralpisalò	1
Piacenza	1
Juventus U23	2

Semi-finals
Ternana	2	0	2
Catania	0	0	0
Feralpisalò	2	0	2
Juventus U23 (a.e.t.)	0	4	4

Final
Ternana	1
Juventus U23	2

=== First round ===
9 October 2019
15:00 CEST

Carpi	2–0	Carrarese
Biasci 51'; Fofana 73'	Report

Stadio Sandro Cabassi, Carpi
Referee: Caldera (Como)

9 October 2019
17:30 CEST

Monza	4–1	Renate
Gliozzi 13'; Marchi 15'; Mosti 36'; Iocolano 68'	Report	De Sena 33'

Stadio Brianteo, Monza
Referee: Frascaro (Florence)

9 October 2019
18:30 CEST

Sambenedettese	0–2	Fermana
	Report	Cognini 17'; D'Angelo 64'

Stadio Riviera delle Palme, San Benedetto del Tronto
Referee: Zucchetti (Foligno)

9 October 2019
18:30 CEST

Südtirol	0–1	Feralpisalò
	Report	Guidetti 33'

Stadio Druso, Bolzano
Referee: Bordin (Bassano del Grappa)

9 October 2019
20:30 CEST

Novara	0–1	Alessandria
	Report	Akammandu 65'

Stadio Silvio Piola, Novara
Referee: Costanza (Agrigento)

9 October 2019
20:30 CEST

Siena	2–0	Pontedera
Guidone 27' (pen.); Panizzi 67'	Report

Stadio Artemio Franchi – Montepaschi Arena, Siena
Referee: Arace (Lugo di Romagna)

9 October 2019
20:30 CEST

Monopoli	3–2	Virtus Francavilla
Salvemini 15'; Moreo 59'; Triarico 90+5'	Report	Puntoriere 3'; Vázquez 71' (pen.)

Stadio Vito Simone Veneziani, Monopoli
Referee: Giaccaglia (Jesi)

9 October 2019
20:30 CEST

Potenza	4–1	Rende
Marini 30', 64'; Longo 34'; Murano 90'	Report	Libertazzi 75' (pen.)

Stadio Alfredo Viviani, Potenza
Referee: Arena (Torre del Greco)

=== Round of 32 ===
6 November 2019
14:30 CET

Piacenza	1–1 (a.e.t.)	Imolese
Della Latta 97'	Report	Padovan 114'
Penalties
Bolis (penalty scored); Corradi (penalty scored); Borri (penalty missed); Nicco (penalty scored)	3–1	(penalty scored) Tentoni; (penalty missed) Padovan; (penalty missed) Valeau; (penalty missed) Boccardi

Stadio Leonardo Garilli, Piacenza
Attendance: 200
Referee: Kumara (Verona)

6 November 2019
15:00 CET

Pro Vercelli	1–0	Carpi
Marcilo 8'	Report

Stadio Silvio Piola, Novara
Referee: Nicolini (Brescia)

6 November 2019
15:00 CET

Catanzaro	2–0	Monopoli
Fischnaller 49'; Giannone 75'	Report

Stadio Nicola Ceravolo, Vercelli
Referee: Acanfora (Castellammare di Stabia)

6 November 2019
17:30 CET

Monza	2–3 (a.e.t.)	Pro Patria
Marchi 33'; Chiricò 44'	Report	Pedone 31'; Marcone 39'; Molnar 109'

Stadio Brianteo, Monza
Referee: Luciani (Rome)

6 November 2019
18:30 CET

Viterbese	0–1	Teramo
	Report	Cancellotti 28'

Stadio Enrico Rocchi, Viterbo
Referee: Deliro (Reggio Emilia)

6 November 2019
20:30 CET

Padova	1–4	L.R. Vicenza
Germano 46'	Report	Arma 16'; Bianchi 32'; Liviero 41'; Zarpellon 59'

Stadio Euganeo, Padua
Referee: Colombo (Como)

6 November 2019
20:30 CET

Juventus U23	1–0	Alessandria
Han 38' (pen.)	Report

Stadio Giuseppe Moccagatta, Alessandria
Referee: Collu (Cagliari)

6 November 2019
20:30 CET

Ravenna	2–4	Cesena
Nocciolini 17'; Fiorani 26'	Report	Giraudo 6', 9'; Franco 7'; Sarao 41'

Stadio Bruno Benelli, Ravenna
Referee: Bitonti (Bologna)

6 November 2019
20:30 CET

Siena	2–0	Arezzo
D'Auria 27'; Polidori 73'	Report

Stadio Artemio Franchi – Montepaschi Arena, Siena
Referee: Meraviglia (Pistoia)

6 November 2019
20:30 CET

Ternana	4–1	Fermana
Vantaggiato 45'; Russo 54'; Torromino 77'; Partipilo 89'	Report	Molinari 9'

Stadio Libero Liberati, Terni
Referee: Moriconi (Rome)

6 November 2019
20:30 CET

Avellino	2–1	Cavese
Alfageme 44'; Micovschi 84' (pen.)	Report	El Ouazni 19'

Stadio Partenio-Adriano Lombardi, Avellino
Referee: Garofalo (Torre del Greco)

6 November 2019
20:30 CET

Casertana	2–1	Bisceglie
Floro Flores 36'; Starita 89' (pen.)	Report	Longo 81'

Stadio Alberto Pinto, Caserta

6 November 2019
20:30 CET

Reggina	2–3	Potenza
Doumbia 59'; De Francesco 74' (pen.)	Report	Iuliano 41'; Arciadacono 55'; Vuletich 79'

Stadio Oreste Granillo, Reggio Calabria
Referee: Marini (Trieste)

7 November 2019
20:00 CET

Feralpisalò	1–0	Lecco
Mordini 10'	Report

Stadio Lino Turina, Salò
Referee: Maggio (Lodi)

13 November 2019
17:00 CET

Triestina	1–0	Virtus Verona
Costantino 80' (pen.)	Report

Stadio Nereo Rocco, Trieste
Referee: De Tommaso (Rimini)

20 November 2019
20:45 CET

Catania	1–0	Sicula Leonzio
Curiale 30'	Report

Stadio Angelo Massimino, Catania
Referee: Cosso (Reggio Emilia)

=== Round of 16 ===
27 November 2019
14:30 CET

Juventus U23	2–0	Pro Vercelli
Federiksen 75'; Clemenza 90+5'	Report

Stadio Giuseppe Moccagatta, Alessandria
Referee: Ricci (Florence)

27 November 2019
15:00 CET

Catanzaro	2–0	Casertana
Fischnaller 5', 10'	Report

Stadio Nicola Ceravolo, Catanzaro
Referee: Natilla (Molfetta)

27 November 2019
15:00 CET

Potenza	1–2	Catania
França 66'	Report	Di Piazza 35' (pen.); Biondi 69'

Stadio Alfredo Viviani, Potenza
Referee: Carella (Bari)

27 November 2019
17:30 CET

Cesena	1–1 (a.e.t.)	Piacenza
Pergeffi 38'	Report	Sarao 41'
Penalties
Ciofi (penalty missed); Rosaia (penalty missed); Franco (penalty scored); Borello (penalty scored)	2–4	(penalty scored) Bolis; (penalty scored) Nicco; (penalty scored) Paponi; (penalty scored) Borri

Stadio Dino Manuzzi, Cesena
Referee: Cudini (Fermo)

27 November 2019
20:00 CET

L.R. Vicenza	3–1 (a.e.t.)	Triestina
Arma 81' (pen.); Alberto Tronco 92'; Guerra 111'	Report	Gomez 73'

Stadio Romeo Menti, Vicenza
Referee: Di Graci (Como)

27 November 2019
20:00 CET

Feralpisalò	3–2	Pro Patria
Magnino 15'; Scarsella 59'; Ceccarelli 90+5' (pen.)	Report	Parker 4'; Defendi 9'

Stadio Lino Turina, Salò
Referee: Donda (Gradisca d'Isonzo)

27 November 2019
20:00 CET

Avellino	0–1	Ternana
	Report	G. Nesta 84'

Stadio Partenio-Adriano Lombardi, Avellino
Referee: Maranesi (Ciampino)

27 November 2019
20:30 CET

Siena	3–1	Teramo
Campagnacci 21'; Arrigoni 34'; Polidori 81'	Report	Bombagi 34'

Stadio Artemio Franchi – Montepaschi Arena, Siena
Referee: Cascone (Nocera Inferiore)

=== Quarter-finals ===
11 December 2019
18:30 CET

Siena	0–1	Ternana
	Report	Vantaggiato 64'

Stadio Artemio Franchi - Montepaschi Arena
Referee: Feliciani (Teramo)

18 December 2019
14:30 CET

Piacenza	1–2	Juventus U23
Cattaneo 7'	Report	Rafia 39' (pen.); Mota 47'

Stadio Leonardo Garilli, Piacenza
Referee: Ricci Florence

18 December 2019
17:30 CEST

Catanzaro	0–1	Catania
	Report	Biagianti 75'

Stadio Nicola Ceravolo, Catanzaro
Referee: Miele (Nola)

18 December 2019
20:00 CET

Vicenza	0–1	Feralpisalò
	Report	Maiorino 63' (pen.)

Stadio Romeo Menti, Vicenza
Referee: Bitonti (Bologna)

=== Semi-finals ===
29 January 2020
15:00 CET

Ternana	2–0	Catania
Partpilo 48'; Torromino 67'	Report

Stadio Libero Liberati, Terni
Referee: De Santis (Lecce)
13 February 2020
15:00 CET

Catania	0–0	Ternana
	Report

Stadio Angelo Massimino, Catania
Referee: Natilla (Molfetta)

Ternana won 2–0 on aggregate.

29 January 2020
20:00 CET

Feralpisalò	2–0	Juventus U23
Maiorino 12', 25'	Report

Stadio Lino Turina, Salò
Referee: D'Asciano (Ancona)
12 February 2020
15:00 CET

Juventus U23	4–0 (a.e.t.)	Feralpisalò
Marchi 14'; Zanimacchia 59', 114' (pen.); Rafia 119'	Report

Stadio Giuseppe Moccagatta, Alessandria
Referee: Marini (Trieste)

Juventus U23 won 4–2 on aggregate.

=== Final ===
27 June 2020
20:45 CEST

Ternana	1–2	Juventus U23
Mammarella 6'	Report	Brunori 12' (pen.); Rafia 45+1'

Stadio Dino Manuzzi, Cesena
Referee: Paterna (Teramo)
