= 2023–24 ACR Messina season =

Messina
2023–24 season
- Manager: Giacomo Modica
- Stadium: Stadio San Filippo
- Serie C: 14th
- Coppa Italia Serie C: First round
- Top goalscorer: League: Michele Emmausso (10); All: Michele Emmausso (10)
- Highest home attendance: 6,895 vs Foggia
- Lowest home attendance: 1,100 vs Picerno
Home colours	Away colours	Third colours

The 2023–24 ACR Messina season was the club's 124th season and its third consecutive season in Serie C.

On 8 July 2023, the club announced the appointment of Giacomo Modica as head coach for the upcoming season.

Messina ended the season by failing to reach the promotion play-offs and achieving a position in the second half of the table.

== Club organization ==
Organizational chart taken from the team's official website.

=== Management ===
- President: Pietro Sciotto
- Vice-president: Matteo Sciotto
- Operations director: Angelo Costa
- General secretary: Alessandro Failla
- Sporting director: Domenico Roma

=== Technical staff ===
- Head coach: Giacomo Modica
- Assistant coach: Emanuele Ferraro
- Goalkeeping coach: Mauro Manganaro
- Fitness coach: Filadelfio Ristuccia
- Match analyst: Piero Giacalone
- Team manager: Fernando Cammarata

== Kits and sponsors ==
Givova remained the club's technical supplier for the 2023–24 season. Supermercati Panarello Carni was the club's shirt sponsors.

== Squad ==
As of 1 February 2024

Note: Flags indicate national team as defined under FIFA eligibility rules; some limited exceptions apply. Players may hold more than one non-FIFA nationality.

No.	Pos.	Nation	Player
1	GK	ITA	Edoardo Piana (on loan from Udinese)
4	DF	MDA	Daniel Dumbravanu (on loan from SPAL)
5	MF	ITA	Marco Firenze
6	DF	ITA	Marco Manetta
7	DF	ITA	Damiano Lia
8	MF	ITA	Giulio Frisenna
9	FW	ITA	Pierluca Luciani (on loan from Frosinone)
10	FW	ITA	Michele Emmausso
11	FW	ITA	Marco Zunno (on loan from Cremonese)
16	MF	ITA	Domenico Franco
19	MF	ITA	Francesco Giunta
20	DF	ITA	Samuele Zona (on loan from Arezzo)

No.	Pos.	Nation	Player
21	DF	ITA	Giuseppe Salvo
23	DF	ITA	Federico Pacciardi
24	FW	ITA	Pasqualino Ortisi
27	FW	ITA	Carlo Cavallo
28	FW	ITA	Vincenzo Plescia
30	GK	ITA	Ermanno Fumagalli
33	DF	ITA	Vincenzo Polito
70	FW	ITA	Marco Rosafio (on loan from SPAL)
77	FW	ITA	Francesco Scafetta (on loan from Bari)
88	MF	ITA	Marco Civilleri
90	FW	ITA	Antonino Ragusa
91	FW	ITA	Sabino Signorile (on loan from Cerignola)

== Transfers ==
=== In ===
Pos.	Player	Transferred from	Fee	Date	Source
DF	(Italy) Vincenzo Polito	(Italy) Potenza	Undisclosed	17 July 2023	
MF	(Italy) Michele Emmausso	(Italy) Picerno	Undisclosed	19 July 2023	
DF	(Italy) Marco Manetta	(Italy) Taranto	Free	20 July 2023	
MF	(Italy) Marco Firenze	(Italy) Sangiuliano	Free	10 August 2023	
MF	(Italy) Domenico Franco	(Italy) Lucchese	Free	26 August 2023	
FW	(Malta) Andrea Zammit	(Malta) Valletta	Free	1 September 2023	

== Pre-season ==
30 July 2023 Friendly	Messina	3–0	Sporting Caccuri

== Competitions ==
=== Overall record ===
Competition	First match	Last match	Starting round	Final position	Record							
Competition	First match	Last match	Starting round	Final position	Pld	W	D	L	GF	GA	GD	Win %
Serie C	2 September 2023	28 April 2024	Matchday 1	14th	38	11	12	15	41	49	−8	28.95
Coppa Italia Serie C	4 October 2023		First round	First round	1	0	0	1	1	2	−1	0.00
Total					39	11	12	16	42	51	−9	28.21

Source: Competitions

=== Serie C ===
==== League table ====
Pos	Team	Pld	W	D	L	GF	GA	GD	Pts	Qualification
12	Sorrento	38	13	9	16	39	47	−8	48 (Note: Foggia are ahead of Sorrento on overall goal difference: Foggia -4, Sorrento -8.)	
13	Catania	38	12	9	17	39	38	+1	45 (Note: Catania are ahead of Messina on overall goal difference: Catania +1, Messina -8.)	National play-offs 1st round (Note: Catania qualify for the national play-offs first round by winning the Coppa Italia Serie C.)
14	Messina	38	11	12	15	41	49	−8	45	
15	Turris	38	11	11	16	46	57	−11	44	
16	Potenza (O)	38	10	13	15	38	47	−9	43	Relegation play-outs

Updated to match(es) played on 27 April 2024. Source: Lega Pro, Soccerway (in English)
Rules for classification: 1) Points; 2) Head-to-head points; 3) Head-to-head goal difference; 4) Goal difference; 5) Goals scored; 6) Lower goals against; 7) Wins; 8) Lower losses; 9) Away wins; 10) Lower home losses.
(Note: Head-to-head record is used only after all the matches between the teams in question have been played)
(O) Play-off winners

==== Results summary ====
Overall								Home						Away					
Pld	W	D	L	GF	GA	GD	Pts	W	D	L	GF	GA	GD	W	D	L	GF	GA	GD
38	11	12	15	41	49	−8	45	7	5	7	21	24	−3	4	7	8	20	25	−5

Source: Worldfootball

==== Results by round ====
Round	1	2	3	4	5	6	7	8	9	10	11	12	13	14	15	16	17	18	19	20	21	22	23	24	25	26	27	28	29
Ground	A	H	A	H	A	H	A	H	A	H	A	H	H	A	H	A	H	A	H	H	A	H	A	H	A	H	A	H	A
Result	D	D	L	D	L	W	L	W	D	L	D	L	L	L	L	W	W	D	D	L	W	W	D	W	W	W	L	D	W
Position	9	13	17	17	16	14	17	14	15	15	16	17	18	18	18	18	17	16	17	17	15	14	14	14	12	12	12	12	

Updated to match(es) played on 2 March 2024. Source: Worldfootball
A = Away; H = Home; W = Win; D = Draw; L = Loss

==== Matches ====
2 September 2023 1	Audace Cerignola	2–2	Messina	Cerignola
CEST (UTC+2)

21 September 2023 4	Messina	3–3	Turris	Messina
CEST (UTC+2)				Stadium: Stadio San Filippo

24 September 2023 5	Virtus Francavilla	1–0	Messina	Francavilla Fontana
CEST (UTC+2)

1 October 2023 6	Messina	1–0	Avellino	Messina
CEST (UTC+2)				Stadium: Stadio San Filippo

8 October 2023 7	Sorrento	1–0	Messina	Sorrento
CEST (UTC+2)

11 October 2023 2	Messina	1–1	Casertana	Messina
CEST (UTC+2)				Stadium: Stadio San Filippo

15 October 2023 8	Messina	1–0	Giugliano	Messina
CEST (UTC+2)				Stadium: Stadio San Filippo

20 October 2023 9	Picerno	1–1	Messina	Picerno
CEST (UTC+2)

26 October 2023 10	Messina	0–1	Brindisi	Messina
CEST (UTC+2)				Stadium: Stadio San Filippo

29 October 2023 11	Crotone	3–3	Messina	Crotone
CET (UTC+1)

1 November 2023 3	Taranto	2–0	Messina	Taranto
CET (UTC+1)

5 November 2023 12	Messina	0–1	Benevento	Messina
CET (UTC+1)				Stadium: Stadio San Filippo

12 November 2023 13	Messina	0–3	Latina	Messina
CET (UTC+1)				Stadium: Stadio San Filippo

19 November 2023 14	Foggia	2–0	Messina	Foggia
CET (UTC+1)

25 November 2023 15	Messina	0–1	Juve Stabia	Messina
CET (UTC+1)				Stadium: Stadio San Filippo

2 December 2023 16	Monterosi	0–2	Messina	Monterosi
CET (UTC+1)

9 December 2023 17	Messina	1–0	Catania	Messina
CET (UTC+1)				Stadium: Stadio San Filippo

16 December 2023 18	Potenza	0–0	Messina	Potenza
CET (UTC+1)

22 December 2023 19	Messina	1–1	Monopoli	Messina
CET (UTC+1)				Stadium: Stadio San Filippo

7 January 2024 20	Messina	1–2	Audace Cerignola	Messina
CET (UTC+1)				Stadium: Stadio San Filippo

14 January 2024 21	Casertana	0–2	Messina	Casertana
CET (UTC+1)

21 January 2024 22	Messina	1–0	Taranto	Messina
CET (UTC+1)				Stadium: Stadio San Filippo

27 January 2024 23	Turris	2–2	Messina	Turris
CET (UTC+1)

3 February 2024 24	Messina	3–2	Virtus Francavilla	Messina
CET (UTC+1)				Stadium: Stadio San Filippo

11 February 2024 25	Avellino	0–1	Messina	Avellino
CET (UTC+1)

14 February 2024 26	Messina	2–0	Sorrento	Messina
CET (UTC+1)				Stadium: Stadio San Filippo

18 February 2024 27	Giugliano	1–0	Messina	Giugliano
CET (UTC+1)

25 February 2024 28	Messina	2–2	Picerno	Messina
CET (UTC+1)				Stadium: Stadio San Filippo

2 March 2024 29	Brindisi	1–3	Messina	Brindisi
CET (UTC+1)

6 March 2024 30	Messina	0–1	Crotone	Messina
CET (UTC+1)				Stadium: Stadio San Filippo

10 March 2024 31	Benevento	1–1	Messina	Benevento
CET (UTC+1)				Stadium: Stadio Ciro Vigorito

16 March 2024 32	Latina	1–1	Messina	Latina
CET (UTC+1)

23 March 2024 33	Messina	0–3	Foggia	Messina
CET (UTC+1)				Stadium: Stadio San Filippo

30 March 2024 34	Juve Stabia	4–1	Messina	Castellammare di Stabia
CET (UTC+1)

7 April 2024 35	Messina	2–1	Monterosi	Messina
CEST (UTC+2)				Stadium: Stadio San Filippo

14 April 2024 36	Catania	1–0	Messina	Catania
CEST (UTC+2)

21 April 2024 37	Messina	2–2	Potenza	Messina
CEST (UTC+2)				Stadium: Stadio San Filippo

27 April 2024 38	Monopoli	2–1	Messina	Monopoli
CEST (UTC+2)	Salvo 10' (o.g.); Tommasini 47'		Luciani 53'	Stadium: Stadio Vito Simone Veneziani

=== Coppa Italia Serie C ===
4 October 2023 First round	Catania	2–1	Messina	Catania
20:45 CEST (UTC+2)	Bočić 54'; Sarao 60'		Pacciardi 86'	Stadium: Stadio Angelo Massimino; Referee: Luca De Angeli di Milano
