= 2019–20 AS Viterbese Castrense season =

Viterbese Castrense
2019–20 season
- Chairman: Marco Romano
- Head coach: Antonio Calabro
- Stadium: Stadio Enrico Rocchi, Viterbo, Italy
- Coppa Italia: First round
- Coppa Italia Serie C: Second round
Home colours	Away colours

Viterbese Castrense are an Italian football club which are based in Viterbo. During the 2019-20 campaign, they participated in the following competitions: Serie C, Coppa Italia, Coppa Italia Serie C.

== Current squad ==
As of 31 January 2020

Note: Flags indicate national team as defined under FIFA eligibility rules; some limited exceptions apply. Players may hold more than one non-FIFA nationality.

No.	Pos.	Nation	Player
1	GK	ITA	Roberto Pini
2	DF	ITA	Francesco De Giorgi
3	DF	ITA	Eros De Santis
4	MF	ITA	Stefano Antezza
5	DF	BIH	Toni Markić
6	DF	ITA	Federico Baschirotto
7	DF	ITA	Giuseppe Scalera
8	FW	ITA	Daniel Bezziccheri
9	FW	ESP	Mamadou Tounkara
10	MF	ITA	Simone Palermo
11	MF	GHA	Emmanuel Besea (on loan from Frosinone)
12	GK	ITA	Matteo Biggeri
14	MF	ITA	Andrea Errico (on loan from Frosinone)
16	MF	ITA	Andrea Corinti

No.	Pos.	Nation	Player
18	FW	ITA	Michele Volpe (on loan from Frosinone)
19	DF	ITA	Mattia Zanoli
20	FW	ITA	Mario Pacilli
21	MF	ITA	Andrea De Falco
22	GK	ITA	Massimiliano Maraolo
23	MF	DEN	Oliver Urso
24	DF	ITA	Stefano Negro (on loan from Monza)
25	FW	ITA	Salvatore Molinaro
27	FW	ITA	Cristian Bunino (on loan from Pescara)
28	DF	ITA	Edoardo Bianchi
29	GK	ITA	Tommaso Vitali (on loan from Ternana)
30	MF	ITA	Davide Sibilia
31	FW	ITA	Nicholas Bensaja
32	FW	ITA	Marco Simonelli

=== Results summary ===
Overall								Home						Away					
Pld	W	D	L	GF	GA	GD	Pts	W	D	L	GF	GA	GD	W	D	L	GF	GA	GD
28	11	5	12	37	37	0	38	8	2	4	24	14	+10	3	3	8	13	23	−10

Last updated: 26 February 2020.

== Matches ==
25 August 2019 Match 1	Viterbese Castrense	2–1	Paganese	Viterbo
18:30 CET	Mamadou Tounkara 37'; Antezza 84'	Report	Alberti 71'	Stadium: Stadio Enrico Rocchi; Attendance: 1,200; Referee: (Italy) Francesco Cosso

1 September 2019 Match 2	Bari	1–3	Viterbese Castrense	Bari
17:30 CET	Simeri (yellow card); Antenucci 67' (pen.)	Report	Mamadou Tounkara (yellow card) (goal) 31' 90+1'; Antezza (yellow card); Andrea Errico (yellow card); Bezziccheri 76'	Stadium: Stadio San Nicola; Attendance: 12,066; Referee: (Italy) Matteo Marcenaro

8 September 2019 Match 3	Viterbese Castrense	1–2	Picerno	Viterbo
17:30 CET	Baschirotto (yellow card) 35' (yellow-red card) 70'; Zhivko Atanasov (yellow card); Antezza (yellow card); Mamadou Tounkara (yellow card) (goal) 57'	Report	Nebil Caidi 25'; Emanuele Santaniello 31'; Mario Vrdoljak (yellow card); Sparcello (yellow card); Antonio Calabrese (yellow card)	Stadium: Stadio Enrico Rocchi; Attendance: 1,300; Referee: (Italy) Emanuele Frascaro

15 September 2019 Match 4	Catania	1–0	Viterbese Castrense	Catania
15:00 CET	Mbende (yellow card); Welbeck (yellow card); Francesco Lodi 50' (pen.); Di Molfetta (yellow card); Dall'Oglio (yellow card)	Report	Zhivko Atansov (yellow card); Bezziccheri (yellow card)	Stadium: Stadio Angelo Massimino; Attendance: 7,669; Referee: (Italy) Mario Vigile

=== Coppa Italia ===
4 August 2019 First Round	Piacenza	1–1 (a.e.t.) (3–2 p)	Viterbese Castrense	Piacenza
18:00	Youssouph Sylla 97'; Bolis (yellow card) 100'	Report	Sebastiano Svidercoshi 94'; Jari Vandeputte (yellow card) 105+2'	Stadium: Stadio Leonardo Garilli; Attendance: 759; Referee: (Italy) Enrico Maggio

=== Coppa Italia Serie C ===
6 November 2019 Second Round	Viterbese Castrense	0–1	Teramo	Viterbo
18:30		Report		Stadium: Stadio Enrico Rocchi
