= 2025–26 AS Gubbio 1910 season =

Italian football club's 2025-26 season

AS Gubbio 1910
2025–26 season
- Manager: Domenico Di Carlo
- Stadium: Stadio Pietro Barbetti
- Serie C: 4th
- Coppa Italia Serie C: First round
- Biggest win: Rimini 0–1 Gubbio
- Biggest defeat: Latina 1–0 Gubbio

The 2025–26 season is the 116th in the history of Associazione Sportiva Gubbio 1910 and the club's tenth consecutive season in the third tier of Italian football. Alongside the domestic league, Gubbio will participate in the Coppa Italia Serie C.

== Squad ==
=== Transfers In ===
Pos.	Player	Transferred from	Fee	Date	Source
FW	(Ghana) Amoako Minta	(Italy) Sassuolo U20	Loan	4 July 2025	
MF	(Italy) Saber Hraiech	(Italy) Trapani	Loan	22 July 2025	
GK	(Lithuania) Titas Krapikas	(Italy) Messina	Free	6 August 2025	
DF	(Italy) Nicolò Fazzi	(Italy) Ternana	Free	9 August 2025	
DF	(Italy) Matteo Bruscagin	(Italy) SPAL	Free	13 August 2025	
MF	(Italy) Halid Djankpata	(Italy) Spezia	Loan	26 August 2025	
FW	(Italy) Andrea La Mantia	(Italy) SPAL	Undisclosed	27 August 2025	

=== Transfers Out ===
Pos.	Player	Transferred to	Fee	Date	Source
DF	(Romania) Antonio David	(Italy) Cesena	Loan return	30 June 2025	
FW	(Italy) Romeo Giovannini	(Italy) Modena	Loan return	30 June 2025	
MF	(Italy) Filippo Faggi	(Italy) Bari	Loan return	30 June 2025	
MF	(Italy) Eugenio D'Ursi	(Italy) Crotone	Loan return	30 June 2025	
DF	(Italy) Diego Stramaccioni	(Italy) Reggiana	Loan return	30 June 2025	
DF	(Italy) Roberto Pirrello	(Italy) Trapani	Free	22 July 2025	
MF	(Italy) Francesco Corsinelli	(Italy) Ravenna	€70,000	2 August 2025	
DF	(Italy) Gabriele Rocchi	(Italy) Casertana	€200,000	2 August 2025	
MF	(Italy) Mattia Proietti	(Italy) Ternana	Undisclosed	9 August 2025	

== Friendlies ==
24 July 2025	Gubbio	5–0	Rappresentativa Locale	Gubbio
				Stadium: Stadio Beniamino Ubaldi; Referee: Tomarelli

27 July 2025	Gubbio	4–0	Trestina	Gubbio
17:30				Stadium: Stadio Beniamino Ubaldi

31 July 2025	Gubbio	1–1	Vigor Senigallia	Gubbio
				Stadium: Stadio Beniamino Ubaldi

9 August 2025	Gubbio	1–0	Siena	Gubbio
17:30				Stadium: Stadio Beniamino Ubaldi

== Competitions ==
=== Overall record ===
Competition	First match	Last match	Starting round	Final position	Record							
Competition	First match	Last match	Starting round	Final position	Pld	W	D	L	GF	GA	GD	Win %
Serie C	23 August 2025	26 April 2026	Matchday 1		5	3	2	0	5	2	+3	60.00
Coppa Italia Serie C	17 August 2025		First round	First round	1	0	0	1	0	1	−1	0.00
Total					6	3	2	1	5	3	+2	50.00

Last updated: 20 September 2025
Source: Competitions

=== Serie C ===
Group B

==== Results summary ====
Overall								Home						Away					
Pld	W	D	L	GF	GA	GD	Pts	W	D	L	GF	GA	GD	W	D	L	GF	GA	GD
5	3	2	0	5	2	+3	11	1	2	0	3	2	+1	2	0	0	2	0	+2

Last updated: 20 September 2025.

==== Results by round ====
Round	1	2	3	4	5	6
Ground	A	H	H	A	H	A
Result	W	D	D	W	W	
Position	2	5	7	5	4	

Updated to match(es) played on 20 September 2025. Source:
A = Away; H = Home; W = Win; D = Draw; L = Loss

==== Matches ====
23 August 2025 1	Rimini	0–1	Gubbio	Rimini
21:00 UTC+2			Tommasini 52'	Stadium: Stadio Romeo Neri; Attendance: 991; Referee: Riccardo Dasso

30 August 2025 2	Gubbio	1–1	Sambenedettese	Gubbio
21:00 UTC+2	Tommasini 19'		Touré 45'	Stadium: Stadio Pietro Barbetti; Attendance: 2,081; Referee: Giuseppe Vingo

6 September 2025 3	Gubbio	1–1	Perugia	Gubbio
15:00 UTC+2	Signorini 34'		Riccardi 3'	Stadium: Stadio Pietro Barbetti; Referee: Edoardo Manedo Mazzoni

13 September 2025 4	Forlì	0–1	Gubbio	Forlì
17:30 UTC+2			Signorini 54'	Stadium: Stadio Tullo Morgagni; Attendance: 1,243; Referee: Giorgio Bozzetto

20 September 2025 5	Gubbio	1–0	Bra	Gubbio
15:00 UTC+2	Di Bitonto 57'			Stadium: Stadio Pietro Barbetti; Referee: Andrea Terribile

23 September 2025 6	Campobasso	v	Gubbio	Campobasso
18:30 UTC+2				Stadium: Stadio Nuovo Romagnoli

=== Coppa Italia Serie C ===
17 August 2025 First round	Latina	1–0	Gubbio	Latina
18:00	Pannitteri 40'			Stadium: Stadio Domenico Francioni; Referee: Andrea Palmieri
