= Mattia Trovato =

Italian footballer (born 1998)

Personal information
- Date of birth: 27 January 1998 (age 28)
- Place of birth: Barcellona Pozzo di Gotto, Italy
- Height: 1.77 m (5 ft 10 in)
- Position: Midfielder

Team information
- Current team: Nuova Igea Virtus
- Number: 21

Youth career
- –2017: Fiorentina

Senior career*
Years	Team	Apps	(Gls)
2017–2022	Fiorentina	0	(0)
2017–2020	→ Cosenza (loan)	22	(0)
2020	→ Livorno (loan)	8	(1)
2020–2021	→ Albinoleffe (loan)	3	(0)
2022	Rende	14	(0)
2022–2023	Castrovillari	13	(1)
2023	Città di Castello	14	(0)
2023–	Nuova Igea Virtus	1	(0)

International career
2013	Italy U-15	6	(1)
2013	Italy U-16	2	(0)
2016	Italy U-18	2	(0)
- * Club domestic league appearances and goals as of 10 September 2023

Mattia Trovato (born 27 January 1998) is an Italian football player who plays for Serie D club Nuova Igea Virtus.

== Club career ==
=== Fiorentina ===
==== Loan to Cosenza ====
On 20 July 2017, Trovato was signed by Serie C side Cosenza on a season-long loan deal. On 21 October he made his Serie C debut for Cosenza as a substitute replacing Massimo Loviso in the 92nd minute of a 2–1 home win over Bisceglie. On 28 January 2018, Trovato played his first match as a starter for Cosenza, a 1–1 away draw against Fidelis Andria, he was replaced by Domenico Mungo in the 77th minute. On 11 February he played his first entire match for Cosenza, a 2–2 away draw against Catania. On 25 March he was sent off with a red card in the 45th minute of a 0–0 home draw against Akragas. Trovato ended his loan to Cosenza with 19 appearances and he helped the club to reach the promotion in Serie B.

On 19 July 2018 his loan was extended for another season. In October, he injured his anterior cruciate ligament in training. The club reported that his recovery time is expected to be five months. On 5 May 2019, Trovato returned from the injury and he made his Serie B debut for Cosenza in a 2–1 away win over Salernitana, he was replaced by Carlos Embalo after 46 minutes. This was the only match that he played this season for Cosenza.

==== Loan to Livorno ====
On 31 January 2020, he moved on loan to Livorno.

==== Loan to Albinoleffe ====
On 6 September 2020 he moved to Albinoleffe on loan.

=== Rende ===
On 1 February 2022, Trovato's contract with Fiorentina was terminated and he joined Rende in Serie D.

== International career ==
Trovato represented Italy at Under-15, Under-16 and Under-18 level. On 19 February 2013, Trovato made his debut at U-15 level in a 2–1 away win over Belgium U-15, he scored his first international goal in the 67th minute. On 5 November 2013, Trovato made his debut at U-16 level in a 1–1 home draw against Austria U-16, he was replaced by Fabio Castellano in the 56th minute. On 14 January 2016 he made his debut at U-18 level as a substitute replacing Francesco Puntoriere in the 74th minute of a 6–0 home win over Belgium U-18.

== Career statistics ==
=== Club ===
As of 15 May 2019

Club	Season	League			Cup		Europe		Other		Total	
Club	Season	League	Apps	Goals	Apps	Goals	Apps	Goals	Apps	Goals	Apps	Goals
Cosenza (loan)	2017–18	Serie C	16	0	0	0	—		3 (Note: Appearance(s) in Serie C play-off.)	0	19	0
Cosenza (loan)	2018–19	Serie B	1	0	0	0	—		—		1	0
Career total			17	0	0	0	—		3	0	20	0
