= Antonino Ragusa =

Italian footballer (born 1990)

Personal information
- Date of birth: 27 March 1990 (age 36)
- Place of birth: Messina, Italy
- Height: 1.83 m (6 ft 0 in)
- Positions: Attacking midfielder; winger

Team information
- Current team: Reggina
- Number: 11

Youth career
- 2000–2006: Giardini Naxos
- 2006–2008: Treviso

Senior career*
Years	Team	Apps	(Gls)
2008–2009	Treviso	1	(0)
2009–2012	Genoa	0	(0)
2010–2011	→ Salernitana (loan)	32	(7)
2011–2012	→ Reggina (loan)	33	(7)
2012–2015	Pescara	40	(9)
2012–2013	→ Ternana (loan)	36	(1)
2014	→ Genoa (loan)	1	(0)
2014–2015	→ Vicenza (loan)	16	(3)
2015–2016	Cesena	37	(8)
2016–2019	Sassuolo	55	(4)
2018–2019	→ Hellas Verona (loan)	11	(0)
2019–2022	Hellas Verona	0	(0)
2019–2020	→ Spezia (loan)	27	(8)
2020–2021	→ Brescia (loan)	30	(2)
2022	Lecce	15	(1)
2022–2024	Messina	48	(2)
2024–	Reggina	32	(11)

International career
2011	Italy U21	2	(0)
- * Club domestic league appearances and goals as of 28 April 2025

Antonino Ragusa (born 27 March 1990) is an Italian footballer who plays as a midfielder for Serie D Group I club Reggina.

== Club career ==
=== Treviso ===
Born in Messina, Sicily, Ragusa started his professional career at Veneto club Treviso, where he played for the Allievi Nazionali under-17 team in the 2006–07 season. In 2008–09 season, despite remained as a member of the under-20 team, Ragusa made his Serie B debut on 7 February 2009 against Rimini. The club went bankrupt at the end of the season.

=== Genoa ===
In July 2009, Ragusa was signed by Serie A club Genoa along with youngster Thomas Bonotto and Marco Bincoletto. Ragusa was a member of Genoa's under-20 team, the Primavera (literally: spring).

In August 2010, he was loaned to Lega Pro Prima Divisione (Italian third level) club Salernitana with an option to purchase. The club reached the promotion playoffs but losing to Verona in the finals. Ragusa himself was in the starting eleven in the playoffs as wing forward/winger in the 4–3–3/4–2–3–1 formation, to support Dino Fava along with Fabinho. In June 2011 Salernitana excised the option but Genoa also excised the counter-option for €100,000. At the end of the season, Salernitana also went bankrupt again.

=== Reggina (loan) ===
On 27 June 2011 he was transferred to second division club Reggina, initially in co-ownership deal to compensate the signing of Francesco Acerbi. However, the deal was documented to Lega Serie B on 31 August 2011, along with Matteo D'Alessandro, but it was later reported as a loan deal. Despite only half of the appearances as starter under former Salernitana coach Roberto Breda, Ragusa scored 6 goals in late September to October (round 6 to 12). Ragusa started most of the game fixture from October (round 9) to 10 December (round 19), partnering centre forward Emiliano Bonazzoli or Fabio Ceravolo in 3–4–1–2 formation (with Simone Missiroli as play-maker) The coach then used him to play as an attacking midfielder/wing forward in 4–2–3–1/4–3–3 formation. Ragusa was out-favoured by Breda in his last two games in charge, with the return of 3–5–2 featuring another forward Alessio Campagnacci to partner with Alessio Viola or Bonazzoli. Despite new coach Angelo Gregucci used 3–4–3 formation in his first game (against Modena), Ragusa remained on the bench. The coach again rotated its starting XI in order to find the best formation. Ragusa returned to the starting XI in round 25 and again in round 27, as a right midfielder in 3–5–2 formation.

In June 2012, Reggina decided to sign Ragusa in a co-ownership deal; however, Genoa activated the counter-option, for which Genoa paid Reggina €50,000.

=== Pescara ===
Ragusa was signed by Serie A club Pescara in a co-ownership deal for €1.5 million on 30 July 2012. On 31 August 2012 he was loaned to Serie B newcomer Ternana along with team-mates Riccardo Brosco and Riccardo Maniero. After Pescara relegated, on 30 June 2013 the co-ownership deal was renewed as well as remaining in Pescara. Ragusa became a key player for the club despite their failure to return to Serie A immediately. On 20 June 2014 the co-ownership deal was renewed again.

=== Genoa return ===
Ragusa returned to Genoa on a temporary deal in July 2014. However, on 12 September 2014, Ragusa left for another Serie B newcomer Vicenza Calcio from Genoa for €60,000. In June 2015 Genoa bought back Ragusa for €725,000.

=== Cesena ===
On 14 July 2015, Ragusa was signed by Cesena for €2.5 million.

=== Sassuolo ===
On 26 August 2016 he was signed by Sassuolo. He made his debut against his former club Pescara on 28 August. However, he was deemed ineligible by the Italian Football Federation, resulting in the result being changed from a Sassuolo win to an automatic 3–0 defeat.

=== Hellas Verona ===
On 3 August 2018, Ragusa joined to Serie B club Hellas Verona on loan until 30 June 2019 with an obligatory buy.

=== Spezia ===
On 1 September 2019, Ragusa joined Spezia on loan until 30 June 2020.

=== Brescia ===
On 1 October 2020, Ragusa joined Brescia on loan with an option to buy.

=== Lecce ===
On 29 January 2022, he transferred permanently to Serie B club Lecce and signed a contract until 30 June 2022.

=== Messina ===
On 31 January 2023, Ragusa joined his hometown club Messina in Serie C.

== International career ==
In November 2011, Ragusa received his first national team call-up. That month Ragusa played both rounds of 2013 UEFA European Under-21 Football Championship qualification. He was the left winger in the latter game (round 5) against Hungary.

== Career statistics ==
=== Club ===
As of match played 23 August 2024

Appearances and goals by club, season and competition
Club	Season	League			National Cup (Note: Includes Coppa Italia, Coppa Italia Serie C)		Europe		Other		Total	
Club	Season	Division	Apps	Goals	Apps	Goals	Apps	Goals	Apps	Goals	Apps	Goals
Treviso	2008–09	Serie B	1	0	0	0	—		—		1	0
Salernitana (loan)	2010–11	Lega Pro 1	32	7	0	0	—		4 (Note: Appearance(s) in Serie C/Lega Pro play-off)	0	36	7
Reggina (loan)	2011–12	Serie B	34	7	0	0	—		—		34	7
Ternana (loan)	2012–13	Serie B	36	1	0	0	—		—		36	1
Pescara	2013–14	Serie B	40	9	2	1	—		—		42	10
Genoa	2014–15	Serie A	1	0	0	0	—		—		1	0
Vicenza (loan)	2014–15	Serie B	16	3	0	0	—		2 (Note: Appearance(s) in Serie B play-off)	0	18	3
Cesena	2015–16	Serie B	37	9	3	1	—		1	0	41	10
Cesena	2016–17	Serie B	0	0	1	0	—		—		1	0
Cesena	Total		37	9	4	1	—		1	0	42	10
Sassuolo	2016–17	Serie A	25	4	1	0	6 (Note: Appearance(s) in UEFA Europa League)	1	—		32	5
Sassuolo	2017–18	Serie A	30	0	2	0	—		—		32	0
Sassuolo	Total		55	4	3	0	6	1	—		64	5
Hellas Verona (loan)	2018–19	Serie B	11	0	1	0	—		—		12	0
Spezia (loan)	2019–20	Serie B	25	8	0	0	—		2	0	27	8
Brescia (loan)	2020–21	Serie B	30	2	0	0	—		1	0	31	2
Hellas Verona	2021–22	Serie A	0	0	1	1	—		—		1	1
Lecce	2021–22	Serie B	15	1	0	0	—		—		15	1
Messina	2022–23	Serie C	11	0	0	0	—		2 (Note: Appearance(s) in Serie C play-out)	1	13	1
Messina	2023–24	Serie C	35	2	1	0	—		—		36	2
Messina	Total		46	2	1	0	—		2	1	49	3
Career total			379	53	12	3	6	1	12	1	409	58
