= Neglia =

Neglia is an Italian surname. Notable people with the surname include:

- José Neglia (1929–1971), Argentine ballerino
- Samuele Neglia (born 1991), Italian footballer
