= Casarotto =

Casarotto is an Italian surname. Notable people with the surname include:

- Davide Casarotto (born 1971), Italian cyclist
- Renato Casarotto (1948–1986), Italian mountaineer
- Stefano Casarotto (born 1996), Italian professional footballer
