= Thomas Schirò =

Italian footballer (born 2000)

Personal information
- Date of birth: 25 April 2000 (age 26)
- Place of birth: Novara, Italy
- Height: 1.83 m (6 ft 0 in)
- Position: Midfielder

Team information
- Current team: Pro Patria
- Number: 40

Youth career
- Inter

Senior career*
Years	Team	Apps	(Gls)
2020–2021	Inter	0	(0)
2020–2021	→ Carrarese (loan)	32	(1)
2021–2025	Crotone	46	(0)
2023	→ Turris (loan)	4	(0)
2024	→ Novara (loan)	8	(0)
2025–	Pro Patria	27	(0)

International career
2015	Italy U-15	2	(0)
2015	Italy U-16	4	(0)
2017	Italy U-18	2	(0)
2018	Italy U-19	4	(0)
- * Club domestic league appearances and goals as of 30 April 2026

Thomas Schirò (born 25 April 2000) is an Italian professional footballer who plays as a midfielder for Serie D club Pro Patria.

== Club career ==
=== Inter ===
Born in Novara, Schirò was a youth exponent of Inter.

==== Loan to Carrarese ====
On 14 September 2020, Schirò was loaned to Serie C club Carrarese on a season-long loan deal. Nine days later, on 23 September, he made his professional debut for the club playing as a starter and he also scored his first goal in the 7th minute of a 4–0 home win over Ambrosiana in the first round of Coppa Italia, he played the entire match. Four days later Schirò made his league debut as a starter in a 0–0 home draw against Pro Patria, he was replaced by Lorenzo Borri in the 88th minute. On 17 October he played his first entire match in Serie C, a 0–0 away draw against Lecco. Five days later, on 21 October, he scored his first goal in Serie C, as a substitute, in the 80th minute of a 2–0 home win over Pistoiese. Schirò ended his season-long loan to Carrarese with 34 appearances, 2 goals and 1 assist.

=== Crotone ===
On 20 August 2021, he moved to Crotone on permanent basis. For the 2022–23 season, Schirò was not included on the club's league squad and only appeared for the Under-19 team. On 31 January 2023, he was loaned by Turris. On 19 January 2024, he was loaned to Novara, with an option to buy.

== Career statistics ==
=== Club ===
As of 18 May 2021

Club	Season	League			Cup		Europe		Other		Total	
Club	Season	League	Apps	Goals	Apps	Goals	Apps	Goals	Apps	Goals	Apps	Goals
Carrarese (loan)	2020–21	Serie C	32	1	2	1	—		—		34	2
Career total			32	1	2	1	—		—		34	2

== Honours ==
=== Club ===
Inter Primavera

- Campionato Primavera 1: 2017–18
- Supercoppa Primavera: 2018
- Torneo di Viareggio: 2018
