= Michele Emmausso =

Italian football player

Personal information
- Full name: Michele Claudio Emmausso
- Date of birth: 4 August 1997 (age 29)
- Place of birth: Naples, Italy
- Height: 1.81 m (5 ft 11 in)
- Position: Winger

Team information
- Current team: Scafatese
- Number: 90

Youth career
- Sporting Neapolis
- Turris
- 2016–2017: Genoa

Senior career*
Years	Team	Apps	(Gls)
2017–2019	Genoa	0	(0)
2017	→ Taranto (loan)	11	(2)
2017–2018	→ Robur Siena (loan)	17	(2)
2018–2019	→ Reggina (loan)	12	(0)
2019	→ Cuneo (loan)	12	(1)
2019–2020	Vibonese	25	(9)
2020–2021	Catania	8	(0)
2021	Lecco	7	(0)
2021–2022	Campobasso	27	(6)
2022–2023	Potenza	15	(3)
2023	Picerno	6	(0)
2023–2024	Messina	34	(10)
2024–2025	Foggia	32	(9)
2025–2026	Cerignola	17	(6)
2026	Cosenza	19	(5)
2026–	Scafatese	1	(0)
- * Club domestic league appearances and goals as of 28 August 2026

Michele Claudio Emmausso (born 4 August 1997) is an Italian footballer who plays as a winger for Serie C Group C club Scafatese.

== Career ==
=== Genoa ===
Born in Naples, Emmausso was a youth player of Genoa.

==== Loan to Taranto ====
On 13 January 2017, Emmausso was signed by Serie C club Taranto on a 6-month loan deal. One week later, he made his professional debut in Serie C for Taranto as a substitute replacing Mario Bollino in the 68th minute of a 0–0 home draw against Siracusa. On 19 March he scored his first professional goal in the 87th minute of a 3–1 away defeat against Modena. On 2 April, Emmausso played his first match as a starter for Taranto and he scored his second goal in the 11th minute of a 2–2 away draw against Virtus Francavilla, but he was sent off with a red card in the 69th minute. On 15 April he played his first entire match for Taranto, a 1–0 home defeat against Monopoli. Emmausso ended his loan to Taranto with 11 appearances, 2 goals and 1 assist.

==== Loan to Robur Siena ====
On 18 July 2017, Emmausso was loaned to Serie C side Robur Siena on a season-long loan deal. On 4 October he made his Serie C debut for Robur Siena as a substitute replacing Alessandro Marotta in the 72nd minute of a 0–0 home draw against Giana Erminio. Nine days later he scored his first goal for Robur Siena, as a substitute, in the 92nd minute of a 1–0 home win over Pro Piacenza. On 8 November, Emmausso played his first match as a starter for Robur Siena, a 2–1 away win over Pistoiese, he was replaced by Samuele Neglia in the 81st minute. On 20 December he was sent off with a red card, as a substitute, in the 92nd minute of a 2–0 away defeat against Cuneo. On 5 May 2018 he scored his second in the 76th minute of a 3–2 away win over Prato. Emmauasso ended his season-long loan to Robur Siena with 17 appearances, 2 goals and 1 assist.

==== Loan to Reggina and Cuneo ====
On 9 July 2018, Emmausso was signed by Serie C club Reggina on a season-long loan deal. On 18 September he made his debut for Reggiana, in Serie C, as a starter in a 3–0 away defeat against Trapani, he was replaced by Salvatore Sandomenico after 45 minutes. However, in January 2019, his loan was interrupted and he left Reggina with 12 appearances, three as a starter, but he never played an entire match.

On 31 January 2019, Emmausso was loaned to Cuneo on a 6-month loan deal. Eleven days later, on 10 February, he made his debut for Cuneo in a 2–1 away win over Olbia, he was replaced by Edoardo Defendi in the 62nd minute. On 5 March he scored his first goal for Cuneo in the 48th minute of a 2–0 home win over Virtus Entella. Emmausso ended his 6-month loan to Cuneo with 14 appearances and 1 goal.

=== Vibonese ===
On 2 September 2019, Emmausso joined Serie C club Vibonese on an undisclosed fee. Six days later, on 8 September, he made his debut for the club as a substitute replacing Nicolàs Bubas in the 79th minute of a 1–1 away draw against Cavese. On 22 September, Emmausso played his first match as a starter for the club, a 2–0 away defeat against Reggina, he was replaced by Filippo Berardi after half-time. Three days later, on 25 September, he scored his first goal for the club in the 61st minute of a 3–1 home win over Picerno.

=== Catania ===
On 3 October 2020 he signed a two-year contract with Catania.

=== Lecco ===
On 11 January 2021, he moved to Lecco.

=== Campobasso ===
On 4 August 2021 he joined to Campobasso.

=== Picerno ===
On 12 January 2023, Emmausso signed with Picerno.

=== Messina ===
On 19 July 2023, Emmausso signed a two-year contract with Messina.

=== Cosenza ===
On 4 January 2026, Emmausso joined Cosenza.

== Career statistics ==
As of match played 16 April 2022

Club	Season	League			Cup		Europe		Other		Total	
Club	Season	League	Apps	Goals	Apps	Goals	Apps	Goals	Apps	Goals	Apps	Goals
Taranto (loan)	2016–17	Serie C	11	2	—		—		—		11	2
Robur Siena (loan)	2017–18	Serie C	17	2	0	0	—		1 (Note: Appearance(s) in Serie C play-off)	0	18	2
Reggina (loan)	2018–19	Serie C	12	0	0	0	—		—		12	0
Cuneo (loan)	2018–19	Serie C	12	1	—		—		2 (Note: Appearance(s) in Serie C play-out)	0	14	1
Vibonese	2019–20	Serie C	25	9	0	0	—		—		25	9
Catania	2020–21	Serie C	8	0	0	0	—		—		8	0
Lecco	2020–21	Serie C	7	0	0	0	—		1	0	8	0
Campobasso	2021–22	Serie C	27	6	0	0	—		—		27	6
Career total			119	20	0	0	—		4	0	123	20
