= Federico Proia =

Italian footballer

Personal information
- Date of birth: 4 February 1996 (age 30)
- Place of birth: Rome, Italy
- Height: 1.85 m (6 ft 1 in)
- Position: Midfielder

Team information
- Current team: Scafatese
- Number: 5

Youth career
- –2014: Siena
- 2014–2015: Torino

Senior career*
Years	Team	Apps	(Gls)
2013–2014	Siena	0	(0)
2015–2016	Torino	0	(0)
2015–2016	→ Pistoiese (loan)	8	(0)
2016	Pistoiese	0	(0)
2016–2018	Spezia	0	(0)
2016–2017	→ Pistoiese (loan)	20	(1)
2017–2018	→ Bassano Virtus (loan)	24	(6)
2018–2021	Cittadella	86	(15)
2021–2024	Vicenza	47	(5)
2022	→ Brescia (loan)	14	(1)
2022–2023	→ SPAL (loan)	12	(0)
2023	→ Ascoli (loan)	10	(0)
2024–2026	Casertana	66	(10)
2026–	Scafatese	2	(0)
- * Club domestic league appearances and goals as of 28 August 2026

Federico Proia (born 4 February 1996) is an Italian professional footballer who plays as a midfielder for Serie C Group C club Scafatese.

== Club career ==
He made his Serie C debut for Pistoiese on 30 January 2016 in a game against SPAL.

On 12 July 2017, he was loaned to Serie C club Bassano on a season-long loan.

On 13 July 2018 he was signed by Cittadella on a permanent basis.

On 17 July 2021, he signed a three-year contract with Vicenza. On 31 January 2022, Proia moved on loan to Brescia. On 19 August 2022, Proia was loaned to SPAL with a conditional obligation to buy. On 23 January 2023, he moved on a new loan to Ascoli, with an option to buy.

On 27 July 2024, Proia moved to Casertana on a two-year contract.
