= Alessio Campagnacci =

Italian footballer (born 1987)

Personal information
- Date of birth: 11 September 1987 (age 39)
- Place of birth: Foligno, Italy
- Height: 1.75 m (5 ft 9 in)
- Position: Forward

Youth career
- Julia Spello
- 2004–2005: → Perugia (loan)

Senior career*
Years	Team	Apps	(Gls)
2005–2006	Perugia	10	(0)
2006–2007	Tolentino	30	(2)
2007–2009	Perugia	10	(1)
2008	→ Giulianova (loan)	13	(5)
2009	→ Sangiovannese (loan)	13	(3)
2009–2010	Giulianova	24	(8)
2010–2013	Reggina	82	(11)
2013–2017	Benevento	85	(6)
2017–2020	Siena	25	(2)
2018	→ Trapani (loan)	10	(1)
2018–2019	→ Gubbio (loan)	25	(1)

International career
2008	Italy U-21 Serie C	1	(0)
- * Club domestic league appearances and goals as of 22 February 2020

Alessio Campagnacci (born 11 September 1987) is an Italian footballer.

== Biography ==
=== Perugia & Giulianova ===
Born in Foligno, the Province of Perugia, Umbria, Campagnacci joined Serie B club AC Perugia on 30 August 2004 along with Giacomo Fabrizi, from a local team of Spello. Despite the club bankrupted at the end of 2004–05 Serie B, a new entity "Perugia Calcio" was allowed to play in 2005–06 Serie C1 (made the team effectively relegated), where Campagnacci made his professional debut.

In mid-2006 he was signed by Serie D team Tolentino, his first club outside his hometown. Campagnacci was re-signed by Perugia in July 2007. However, he only played once in the third division. In January 2008 he was loaned to the fourth division club Giulianova. Campagnacci played an improved 9 games for Perugia in 2008–09 Lega Pro Prima Divisione, the first season since the name change of the third division. In January 2009 he was loaned out again to Lega Pro Seconda Divisione club Sangiovannese. In July 2009 he was loaned to the town of Giulianova again, where the club won the promotion playoffs in 2009. He scored his career high of 8 goals in the "Lega Pro Prime Division". The team relegated after losing the relegation "play-out" to Andria. However Perugia also bankrupted again, thus Campagnacci signed a new contract with Giulianova Calcio.

=== Reggina ===
In July 2010 second division club Reggina Calcio borrowed Campagnacci from Giulianova. He also entered the first session of pre-season camp. Campagnacci was the starting forward along with Emiliano Bonazzoli under the command of Gianluca Atzori. Campagnacci played 27 starts but with 3 goals only. Reggina was able to enter the promotion playoffs in June, losing to Novara in the first round. Eventually Novara was the winner.

2011–12

On the same day that Reggina presented Roberto Breda as coach, Campagnacci was signed outright from the Abruzzo team. Later Jonis Khoris joined Giulianova as part of the compensation. At first he was the favourite of Breda along with Bonazzoli, where Campagnacci scored 4 goals in the first 5-round (But Bonazzoli failed to score any). However, after a goal drought, Antonino Ragusa was preferred as one of the two forwards in the 3–5–2 formation (round 9 to round 17), ahead Campagnacci. Breda also picked Ceravolo or Bonazzoli as another forward. In round 18 and 19 the coach changed the tactics to 4–2–3–1/4–3–3, which Campagnacci was the supportive striker/attacking midfielder in the first game (for centre forward Bonazzoli along with Ragusa) and as a centre forward in the second one (which Ceravolo and Ragusa were his partner). Campagnacci scored in the latter one, made him secured a place in starting eleven. Breda brought back 3–5–2 formation to partner with Alessio Viola or Bonazzoli in round 20 and 21 (with the latter one without departed playmaker Missiroli, also the team top-scorer; was replaced by Nicolas Viola), However Breda could not save his position where he was axed after round 21, a 0–0 draw, the first match after the winter break. Campagnacci made 11 starts under Breda and 10 of them before the winter break.

Under new coach Angelo Gregucci, the coach changed to use 3–4–3 formation against Modena (round 22), and Campagnacci remained in starting XI to partner with Bonazzoli and Ceravolo. The game ended in 3–3 draw. The coach then changed to use 3–5–2 formation since round 23. He only missed the round 24 and 26 to squad rotation. He scored once in round 25 and again round 27.

Campagnacci wore no.87 shirt, his year of birth since 2010–11 season.

=== Representative teams ===
Campagnacci played for the representative teams of Serie C / Lega Pro in 2007–08 and 2008–09 season. He was selected to Serie C1 Group B under-21 representative team for the Serie C1 U-21 Trophy in January 2008, losing to the Group A. At the end of 2007–08 season he was selected to Serie C representative team for Dossena youth trophy, losing to Grêmio youth team after penalty shootout. Campagnacci played his only international match for "Italy Serie C" against England Semi-Pro on 12 November 2008, the last group match of 2007–09 International Challenge Trophy.
