= Gabriele Raja =

Italian footballer, midfield

Personal information
- Date of birth: 26 January 2000 (age 26)
- Place of birth: Genoa, Italy
- Height: 1.87 m (6 ft 2 in)
- Position: Midfielder

Team information
- Current team: Ligorna
- Number: 24

Youth career
- Genoa

Senior career*
Years	Team	Apps	(Gls)
2017–2019	Albissola	55	(4)
2019–2021	Arezzo	2	(0)
2020	→ Giana Erminio (loan)	0	(0)
2021–	Ligorna	7	(0)
- * Club domestic league appearances and goals as of 31 October 2021

Gabriele Raja (born 26 January 2000) is an Italian footballer who plays as a midfielder for Serie D side Ligorna.

== Club career ==
Raja started his career in Genoa, he signed to Serie D side Albissola in the summer of 2017. The team promoted to Serie C at the end of the season, Raja made his professional debut in the first round of 2018–19 season, coming on as a substitute in the 71st minute for Davide Sibilia in the 3–2 home loss against Olbia.

On 12 July 2019, he signed with Arezzo. On 31 January 2020, he joined Giana Erminio on loan.

For the 2021–22 season, he joined Ligorna in Serie D.

== Sources ==
- Gabriele Raja at TuttoCalciatori.net (in Italian)
- Gabriele Raja at Soccerway (archived)
