= Ettore Marchi =

Italian footballer (born 1985)

Personal information
- Date of birth: 6 November 1985 (age 41)
- Place of birth: Gubbio, Italy
- Height: 1.85 m (6 ft 1 in)
- Position: Striker

Team information
- Current team: Branca

Youth career
- Gubbio

Senior career*
Years	Team	Apps	(Gls)
2004–2007	Gubbio	67	(12)
2007–2011	Triestina	36	(6)
2007–2008	→ Sangiovannese (loan)	15	(0)
2008–2009	→ Bellaria – I.M. (loan)	43	(12)
2009–2010	→ PortoSummaga (loan)	27	(6)
2011–2012	Sassuolo	29	(5)
2012–2013	Benevento	30	(5)
2013–2016	Pro Vercelli	106	(38)
2016–2017	Reggiana	29	(0)
2017–2018	Gubbio	52	(18)
2019–2020	Monza	34	(4)
2020	→ Juventus U23 (loan)	6	(3)
2020–2021	Vis Pesaro	29	(4)
2021–2022	Fermana	31	(2)
2022–	Branca	0	(0)
- * Club domestic league appearances and goals as of 23 April 2022

Ettore Marchi (born 6 November 1985) is an Italian professional footballer who plays as a striker for an amateur side Branca.

== Club career ==
Born in Gubbio, Umbria, Marchi started his career at A.S. Gubbio 1910. In January 2007 he was signed by Serie B side Triestina and loaned back to Gubbio. He then spent 3 more seasons in Italian Lega Pro leagues with 3 different clubs. After the club relegated to Lega Pro Prima Divisione and re-admitted to Serie B, Marchi finally became a member of the first team, and played every league match before the winter break and played 36 games, including 33 starts. The coach rotated his goalscoring partner instead, between Denis Godeas, Lucas Longoni, Massimiliano Lionetti and Luigi Della Rocca (or even 4-5-1 formation). The team finished in 20th and was relegated.

On 3 August 2011 he joined Serie B team Sassuolo in 2-year deal, for €130,000 transfer fee. On 27 June 2012, Marchi was sold to the third division club Benevento for €150,000 also in 2-year contract. On 12 August 2013, Marchi left for fellow third division club Pro Vercelli, which had recently been relegated, while Matteo Di Piazza joined Benevento from Vercelli in exchange.

On 7 January 2019, Marchi signed for Serie C club Monza until 30 June 2020. He was sent on a six-month loan to Juventus U23 on 21 January 2020. On 12 August 2020 Marchi joined Vis Pesaro on a two-year contract. On 23 July 2021, he was transferred to Fermana, with Marco Manetta moving in the opposite direction in exchange.

== Honours ==
=== Club ===
PortoSummaga

- Lega Pro Prima Divisione: 2010

Juventus U23

- Coppa Italia Serie C: 2019–20
