= Marco Toscano =

Italian footballer

Personal information
- Date of birth: 7 July 1997 (age 29)
- Place of birth: Erice, Italy
- Height: 1.85 m (6 ft 1 in)
- Position: Midfielder

Team information
- Current team: Scafatese

Youth career
- Palermo

Senior career*
Years	Team	Apps	(Gls)
2015–2019	Palermo	0	(0)
2016–2018	→ Siracusa (loan)	36	(0)
2018–2019	→ Trapani (loan)	33	(2)
2019–2021	Virtus Entella	33	(1)
2021–2022	Virtus Francavilla	28	(0)
2022–2023	Gubbio	32	(3)
2023–2024	Casertana	30	(1)
2024–2026	Avellino	5	(0)
2025	→ Trapani (loan)	15	(0)
2025–2026	→ Casertana (loan)	31	(0)
2026–	Scafatese	0	(0)
- * Club domestic league appearances and goals as of 20 July 2026

Marco Toscano (born 7 July 1997) is an Italian professional footballer who plays as a midfielder for Serie C club Scafatese.

== Club career ==
He is the product of youth teams of Palermo and played for their Under-19 squad beginning with the 2014–15 season. He made a handful of bench appearances for Palermo's senior squad in 2015–16 Serie A season, but did not see any time on the field.

He joined Serie C club Siracusa on loan for the 2016–17 season, the loan was eventually extended for the 2017–18 season as well. He made his Serie C debut for Siracusa on 2 October 2016 in a game against Melfi as a 70th-minute substitute for Liberato Filosa.

On 9 August 2018, he moved on another season-long loan to Serie C, this time to his home province club Trapani.

On 24 June 2019, he signed with Serie B club Virtus Entella.

On 31 August 2021, he joined Virtus Francavilla.

On 10 August 2022, Toscano moved to Gubbio on a two-year deal.
