= Francesco Forte (footballer, born 1991) =

Italian footballer

Personal information
- Date of birth: 12 October 1991 (age 35)
- Place of birth: Campora San Giovanni, Italy
- Height: 1.88 m (6 ft 2 in)
- Position: Goalkeeper

Team information
- Current team: Scafatese
- Number: 22

Youth career
- –2009: Vigor Lamezia

Senior career*
Years	Team	Apps	(Gls)
2009–2013	Vigor Lamezia	118	(0)
2013–2015	Carpi	0	(0)
2013–2014	→ Gavorrano (loan)	30	(0)
2014	→ Real Agro Aversa (loan)	18	(0)
2015	→ Vigor Lamezia (loan)	15	(0)
2015–2017	Maceratese	68	(0)
2017–2018	Rende	22	(0)
2018	Casertana	0	(0)
2018–2019	Viterbese	17	(0)
2019–2020	Carrarese	25	(0)
2020–2023	Avellino	55	(0)
2023–2024	Monterosi	30	(0)
2023	→ Virtus Francavilla (loan)	0	(0)
2024–2026	Campobasso	26	(0)
2026–	Scafatese	1	(0)
- * Club domestic league appearances and goals as of 28 August 2026

Francesco Forte (born 12 October 1991) is an Italian professional footballer who plays as a goalkeeper for Serie C Group C club Scafatese.

== Club career ==
In August 2020, Forte joined to Serie C club Avellino.

On 11 January 2023, Forte moved to Monterosi. On 17 August 2023, he was loaned by Virtus Francavilla.

On 13 July 2024, Forte signed a two-year contract with Campobasso.
