= Loris Bacchetti =

Italian footballer

Personal information
- Date of birth: 6 February 1993 (age 33)
- Place of birth: Guardiagrele, Italy
- Height: 1.94 m (6 ft 4 in)
- Position: Defender

Team information
- Current team: Scafatese

Youth career
- Pescara
- 2010–2011: Sampdoria

Senior career*
Years	Team	Apps	(Gls)
2011–2014	Pescara	3	(0)
2012–2013	→ Virtus Lanciano (loan)	2	(0)
2013–2014	→ Catanzaro (loan)	19	(0)
2014–2015	Juve Stabia	5	(0)
2015	Ancona	6	(2)
2015–2016	Catania	1	(0)
2016	Monopoli	16	(4)
2016–2017	Pro Vercelli	0	(0)
2016–2017	→ Monopoli (loan)	12	(0)
2017–2019	Monopoli	15	(0)
2019	→ Cavese (loan)	14	(2)
2019–2020	Gubbio	23	(0)
2020–2024	Feralpisalò	88	(2)
2024–2026	Casertana	72	(4)
2026–	Scafatese	0	(0)

International career^{‡}
2012	Italy U20	4	(0)
- * Club domestic league appearances and goals as of 29 August 2026 ‡ National team caps and goals as of 17 October 2012

Loris Bacchetti (born 6 February 1993) is an Italian professional footballer who plays as a defender for Serie C Group C club Scafatese.

== Club career ==
Born in Guardiagrele, Abruzzo, Bacchetti started his career at Abruzzo team Pescara. In January 2010, he was exchanged for Danilo Soddimo. 50% registration rights of Bacchetti was valued €300,000 and the 50% rights of Soddimo also valued €300,000. Bacchetti returned to Pescara along with Bruno Martella in summer 2011. Bacchetti played three times in 2011–12 Serie B. In June 2012 Sampdoria acquired Martella outright and sold Bacchetti back to Pescara. On 16 July 2012, he joined Serie B club Virtus Lanciano on a loan deal.

On 3 January 2013 he was signed by Catanzaro. The loan was renewed on 12 July 2013.

On 29 January 2019, he joined Cavese on loan.

On 26 June 2019, Bacchetti signed with Gubbio.

On 28 July 2020 Bacchetti signed a 3-year contract with Feralpisalò.

== International career ==
Bacchetti was a youth international for Italy U20.
