= Marco Baldan =

Italian football player

Personal information
- Date of birth: 13 November 1993 (age 32)
- Place of birth: Cittadella, Italy
- Height: 1.82 m (6 ft 0 in)
- Position: Defender

Team information
- Current team: Scafatese

Youth career
- Vigonovo-Tombelle
- Stra
- –2008: Montebelluna
- 2008–2012: Milan

Senior career*
Years	Team	Apps	(Gls)
2012–2014	Nocerina	30	(2)
2013–2014	→ Latina (loan)	1	(0)
2014–2016	Perugia	1	(0)
2015–2016	→ Lumezzane (loan)	17	(0)
2016–2018	Südtirol	18	(0)
2018–2019	Arzachena	35	(1)
2019–2021	Arezzo	40	(1)
2021	Pistoiese	15	(2)
2021–2022	Lucchese	25	(0)
2022–2023	Brindisi	26	(0)
2023–2024	Vibonese	31	(2)
2024–2025	Siracusa	31	(2)
2025–	Scafatese	0	(0)
- * Club domestic league appearances and goals as of 4 May 2025

Marco Baldan (born 13 November 1993) is an Italian footballer who plays as a defender for Serie D club Scafatese.

== Club career ==
He made his Serie C debut for Nocerina on 2 September 2012 in a game against Andria BAT.

On 8 July 2019, he joined Arezzo.

On 1 February 2021, he moved to Pistoiese.

On 17 August 2021, he joined Lucchese.
