= Emilio Volpicelli =

Italian footballer (born 1992)

Personal information
- Date of birth: 3 August 1992 (age 34)
- Place of birth: Naples, Italy
- Height: 1.90 m (6 ft 3 in)
- Position: Forward

Team information
- Current team: Scafatese
- Number: 7

Youth career
- Ascoli

Senior career*
Years	Team	Apps	(Gls)
2011	Montegranaro		
2011–2012	Nuvla San Felice	17	(2)
2012–2013	Sant'Antonio Abate	17	(2)
2013	Nardò	2	(0)
2013–2014	Ostuni		
2014	Gallipoli	12	(1)
2014–2015	Fidelis Andria	18	(2)
2015	Bisceglie	14	(7)
2015–2016	Venezia	13	(3)
2016–2017	Fidelis Andria	26	(0)
2017–2018	FC Francavilla	32	(29)
2018–2020	Salernitana	0	(0)
2018	→ Pro Piacenza (loan)	11	(2)
2019–2020	→ Sambenedettese (loan)	27	(3)
2020–2021	Matelica	37	(14)
2021–2023	Viterbese	57	(16)
2023	Sangiuliano	12	(1)
2023–2024	Pineto	35	(12)
2024–2025	Picerno	29	(4)
2025–	Scafatese	31	(10)
- * Club domestic league appearances and goals as of 29 October 2026

Emilio Volpicelli (born 3 August 1992) is an Italian footballer who plays as a forward for Serie C club Scafatese.

== Club career ==
He made his Serie C debut for Fidelis Andria on 29 August 2016 in a game against Foggia.

He was the top-scorer of Group H of 2017–18 Serie D.

On 13 July 2019, he joined Sambenedettese on loan.

On 27 August 2020 he was sold to Matelica.

On 7 June 2021, he moved to Viterbese.

On 31 January 2023, Volpicelli signed a 1.5-year contract with Sangiuliano.

On 9 July 2023, he joined Pineto.

On 22 August 2024, Volpicelli moved to Picerno on a two-year deal.
