= Roberto Ogunseye =

Italian footballer (born 1995)

Personal information
- Full name: Ibukun Roberto Kehinde Ogunseye
- Date of birth: 16 May 1995 (age 31)
- Place of birth: Mantua, Italy
- Height: 1.89 m (6 ft 2 in)
- Position: Striker

Team information
- Current team: Giugliano (on loan from Cesena)
- Number: 90

Youth career
- –2013: Inter Milan

Senior career*
Years	Team	Apps	(Gls)
2013–2017	Inter Milan	0	(0)
2013	→ Marano (loan)	4	(0)
2014	→ Montebelluna (loan)	14	(5)
2014–2017	→ Prato (loan)	53	(8)
2017	→ Olbia (loan)	10	(3)
2017–2020	Olbia	75	(22)
2020–2021	Cittadella	35	(5)
2020	→ Olbia (loan)	6	(2)
2021–2023	Modena	22	(5)
2022–2023	→ Foggia (loan)	41	(11)
2023–	Cesena	25	(4)
2024–2025	→ Arezzo (loan)	33	(4)
2025–2026	→ Perugia (loan)	10	(1)
2026–	→ Giugliano (loan)	16	(2)
- * Club domestic league appearances and goals as of 21 August 2026

Ibukun Roberto Kehinde Ogunseye (born 16 May 1995) is an Italian professional footballer who plays as a striker for Serie C Group C club Giugliano, on loan from Cesena.

== Career ==
On 17 July 2021, Ogunseye signed a three-year contract with Serie C side Modena. He made his debut on 29 August in a 0–0 draw against Grosseto. On 6 September, he scored his first goal for the club in a 1–1 draw at home against Reggiana.

On 20 July 2022, Ogunseye moved on loan to Foggia, with an option to buy.

On 8 August 2023, Ogunseye signed a two-year contract with Cesena. On 28 August 2024, he moved on loan to Arezzo, with an option to buy.

== Personal life ==
Born in Italy, Ogunseye is of Nigerian descent.

== Honours ==
Individual

- Coppa Italia Serie C top goalscorer: 2019–20
