= Mattia Gennari =

Italian footballer

Personal information
- Date of birth: 18 December 1991 (age 34)
- Place of birth: Città di Castello, Italy
- Height: 1.83 m (6 ft 0 in)
- Position: Centre back

Team information
- Current team: Pistoiese

Senior career*
Years	Team	Apps	(Gls)
2008–2011	Sansepolcro	43	(2)
2011–2013	Melfi	66	(2)
2013–2014	Aversa Normanna	13	(0)
2014–2015	Sansepolcro	31	(2)
2015–2016	Foligno	27	(0)
2016–2017	Vis Pesaro	27	(0)
2017–2018	Fermana	22	(1)
2018–2021	Vis Pesaro	79	(6)
2021–2022	Pistoiese	20	(2)
2022–2023	Montevarchi	38	(5)
2023–2024	Nardò	16	(1)
2024–2025	Sambenedettese	32	(2)
2025–	Pistoiese	0	(0)
- * Club domestic league appearances and goals as of 12 May 2025

Mattia Gennari (born 18 December 1991) is an Italian professional footballer who plays as a centre back for Pistoiese.

== Club career ==
Born in Città di Castello, Gennari started his career in Serie D club Sansepolcro.

In 2018, he returned to Vis Pesaro. After four seasons in Vis Pesaro, on 25 August 2021, he left the club. Gennari played 112 matches and was the captain.

On 31 January 2022, he signed with Montevarchi on Serie C.
