= Scafatese Calcio 1922 =

Italian football club

Scafatese
- Full name: Società Sportiva Scafatese Calcio 1922
- Nicknames: I Canarini (The Canaries); I Gialloblù (The Yellow and Blues)
- Founded: 1922
- Ground: Stadio Giovanni Vitiello, Scafati, Italy
- Capacity: 2,650
- Chairman: Felice Romano
- Manager: Giovanni Ferraro
- League: Serie C Group C
- 2025–26: Serie D Group G, 1st of 18 (promoted)
- Website: www.scafatesecalcio.it
Home colours	Away colours

Società Sportiva Scafatese Calcio 1922 is an Italian association football club located in Scafati, Campania and currently plays in the Serie C, Italian third level league.

== History ==
=== Foundation ===
Founded in 1922, the club was initially named Unione Sportiva Scafatese. Initially playing in the Second and Third Division championships, they beat Avellino 15–0 in their 1941 match. Reached Serie C for the first time, they played for two seasons before the interruption of World War II.

=== Serie B ===
After the championships resumed, Scafatese enrolled in the 1945–'46 Serie C championship and finished third. Due to the resignation of two preceding teams (Benevento and Gladiator,) it was promoted to Serie B for the '46–'47 season. Gialloblù closed the championship in fourth place in their first year of the league, winning the same amount of points as Lecce, with Ternana and Pescara promoted to Serie A. During the '47–'48 championship however, they placed twelfth, and were relegated to Serie C due to recent reforms.

Scafatese retired at the start of the 1948–'49 Serie C championship from financial difficulties, after scoring a single point in 11 days.

=== From the 1950s to the 1970s ===
After retiring, Scafatese participated in the First Division championship for 3 seasons (the fifth series at the time, after Serie A, B, C and Promotion). When the Fourth Series was established, however, they participated in the Promotion championship from 1952–'53 for 2 seasons. Relegated to the First Division afterwards, the team remained there until '56–'57, when it was promoted to the national amateur championship. During the '57–'58 season, Scafatese won their group ahead of Turris, but lost during the next phase. Things took a turn following year as the Canaries came second in group D, behind their cousins Angri. In the '59–'60 season, Scafatese entered the national finals, and after beating Libertas Potenza, Morrone and Calangianus, they played finals in Rimini for the title against Ponziana from Trieste. After a 1–1 draw, however, the referee decided the match with a coin flip, and Scafatese won.

The 1960s saw the team compete in Serie D for nine consecutive years, with its highest placement at fourth during the '62–'63 season, but they were eventually demoted at the end of the '68–'69 championship. In the early 70's, Scafatese was relegated to First Category, but returned after a year to the Promotion. The team was close to returning to the fourth series several times, concluding the seasons 1972–'73 and '74–'75 in second place, but finally returned to Serie D in the '75–'76 season. In '76–'77 and '77–'78, the Canaries played in the Serie D championship, demoting Scafatese at the end of the latter.

=== From the 1980s to the 2000s ===
After the demotion, the team struggled to recover. A crisis of results in 1983–'84 caused Scafatese to sink into the First Category, and only returned to register in the Promotion after merging with Don Bosco Oplonti in 1986. The yellow-blues placed second in '87–'88 behind Ebolitana, and again in '88–'89 in second place behind Nocerina but this time they were still rescued in the Interregional. From the '89–'90 season the Canaries played eight consecutive championships in the fourth series, winning salvation on the last day more than once, until relegation came in the '96–'97 season. In both the '97–'98 and '98–'99 seasons, Scafatese played in the regional Eccellenza championship with little satisfaction.

=== From the 2000s to the 2010s ===
The 1999–2000 championship, however, proved to be exciting, in fact with twenty victories, nine draws and only one defeat against the grey-reds of Angri, Scafatese won the tournament and returned to Serie D after three years, however in the 2000–'01 season the Canarini relegated following the 2–1 defeat in Olbia on the penultimate day of the championship. In '03–'04 the yellow-blue team managed to return to Serie D by beating Gragnano 2–1 on the last day of the championship at the Romeo Menti in Castellammare di Stabia. This time the Gialloblù achieved safety in Serie D in the '04–'05 season after winning the play-out match.

After fourth place in the 2005–'06 season, the following year they managed to return to Serie C, after an exciting duel with Sibilla Cuma from Bacoli, who were five points behind at the end of the season. The typical formation of the Scafatese team that won the '06–'07 Serie D championship coached by Egidio Pirozzi is: Sorriso, Baylon, Santamaria, Cordua, De Franco, Ginobili, Marzano, Marasco, Cosa, Sarli, Spinelli. And so on 6 May 2007, Scafatese finally landed in C2, defeating the Lazio team Pisoniano 6–3 at the Comunale di Scafati in front of around seven thousand spectators.

In Serie C2 in the 2007–'08 season, Scafatese, after avoiding direct relegation on the last day by winning at home to Real Marcianise, crossed Val di Sangro in the play-outs, saving themselves at the end of the double match (1–0 at home and 2 -2 in Abruzzo). In the '08–'09 championship this time the team managed to achieve its seasonal objective by avoiding the play-outs two days early and therefore directly saving itself in a year where the Canaries performed well, just as there was a quiet salvation also in the '09–'10 season.

=== 2010–2020 ===
In the summer of 2010, due to serious economic problems, the company was not registered in the Lega Pro Seconda Division championship but did not fail and started again from the Third Category, where it managed to win three consecutive championships, to then carry out a merger with the club of Montecorvino Rovella thus enrolling in the Eccellenza championship for the 2013–2014 season. In the 2014–15 season Scafatese reached the final of the Regional Italian Cup but was defeated 2–0 by Virtus Volla, while the following year they were relegated after losing the play-out against Valdiano. The team thus starts again from the Promotion where in the 2017–2018 season it manages to return to Excellence after two years, a category that Scafatese maintains the following year after winning the play-out playoff. After this salvation, the team continues to compete in the Eccellenza championship also in the 2019–2020 season and then in 2020–2021, being defeated in the latter year in the first round of the play-offs. Scafatese subsequently reached the play-offs for another three consecutive seasons, but was eliminated first by Savoia in the 2021–2022 season, then by Agropoli in the 2022–2023 championship and finally by the Amalfi Coast in 2023–24.

== Colors and badge ==
The team has blue and yellow colors.

== Current squad ==
As of 1 September 2026

Note: Flags indicate national team as defined under FIFA eligibility rules; some limited exceptions apply. Players may hold more than one non-FIFA nationality.

No.	Pos.	Nation	Player
1	GK	USA	Gabriel Becchi
4	DF	ITA	Marco Baldan
5	MF	ITA	Federico Proia
6	DF	ARG	Joaquin Suhs
7	FW	ITA	Emilio Volpicelli
8	MF	ITA	Alessio Esposito
10	FW	BRA	Lucas Dambros
11	DF	ITA	Pasqualino Ortisi
12	GK	ITA	Domenico Lamberti
15	MF	ITA	Filippo Tripi
16	FW	ITA	Roberto Convitto
19	MF	ITA	Giuseppe Faiello
20	DF	ITA	Mattia Scognamiglio
21	DF	ITA	Errico Altobello
22	GK	ITA	Francesco Forte

No.	Pos.	Nation	Player
23	MF	ARG	Juan Ignacio Brunet
24	MF	ITA	Marco Toscano
27	FW	ITA	Ciro Palmieri
28	FW	ITA	Salvatore Molinaro
32	DF	ITA	Cristian Terribili
35	DF	ITA	Mattia Novella
50	MF	ITA	Pasquale De Michele
55	DF	ITA	Vincenzo Guerra
76	MF	ITA	Pietro Santarpia
77	DF	ITA	Claudio Manzi
90	FW	ITA	Michele Emmausso
91	FW	ITA	Salvatore Longo
98	MF	ITA	Emmanuele De Chiara (on loan from Napoli)
—	DF	ITA	Loris Bacchetti

=== Out on loan ===
Note: Flags indicate national team as defined under FIFA eligibility rules; some limited exceptions apply. Players may hold more than one non-FIFA nationality.

No.	Pos.	Nation	Player
—	GK	ITA	Jonas Arlanch (at Chievo until 30 June 2027)
—	GK	ITA	Andrea Giardino (at Brindisi until 30 June 2027)
—	DF	ITA	Catello Esposito (at Lucchese until 30 June 2027)
—	DF	ITA	Kevin Magri (at Sarnese until 30 June 2027)

No.	Pos.	Nation	Player
—	MF	ITA	Cristian Istrice (at Siracusa until 30 June 2027)
—	MF	ITA	Giuseppe Sicurella (at Paganese until 30 June 2027)
—	FW	ITA	Domenico Maggio (at Sarnese until 30 June 2027)

== Past players ==
Note: Flags indicate national team as defined under FIFA eligibility rules; some limited exceptions apply. Players may hold more than one non-FIFA nationality.

No.	Pos.	Nation	Player
1	GK	ITA	*Luigi Sorrentino
