= Davide Sibilia =

Italian footballer (born 1999)

Personal information
- Date of birth: 29 July 1999 (age 27)
- Place of birth: Conegliano, Italy
- Height: 1.82 m (6 ft 0 in)
- Position: Midfielder

Team information
- Current team: Viterbese
- Number: 17

Youth career
- –2014: Sacilese
- 2014–2018: Genoa

Senior career*
Years	Team	Apps	(Gls)
2018–2019	Genoa	0	(0)
2018–2019	→ Albissola (loan)	24	(1)
2019–	Viterbese	31	(1)
- * Club domestic league appearances and goals as of 18 March 2021

Davide Sibilia (born 29 July 1999) is an Italian football player. He plays for Viterbese.

== Club career ==
=== Genoa ===
Born in Conegliano, Sibilia was a youth exponent of Genoa.

==== Loan to Albissola ====
On 20 July 2019, Sibilia was loaned to Serie C side Albissola on a season-long loan deal. On 19 September he made his professional debut in Serie C for Albissola in a 3–2 home defeat against Olbia, he was replaced by Gabriele Raja after 71 minutes. One month later, on 18 November, he played his first entire match for the team, a 1–0 away defeat against Gozzano. On 23 December, Sibilia scored his first professional goal in the 9th minute of a 2–2 away draw against Lucchese. Sibilia ended his season-long loan to Albissola with 24 appearances, including 18 as a starter, and 1 goal.

=== Viterbese ===
On 17 September 2019 he signed with Serie C club Viterbese on a free-transfer. On 6 October he made his debut for the club as an 80th-minute substitute replacing Mario Pacilli in a 3–0 away defeat against Potenza. Two weeks later, on 19 October, Sibilia played his first match as a starter for Viterbese and he also scored his first goal in the 48th minute of a 6–1 home win over Rende, he was replaced by Mario Pacilli after 66 minutes. One week later, on 27 October, he played his first entire match for the club, a 2–0 home win over Sicula Leonzio.

== Career statistics ==
=== Club ===
As of 18 March 2021

Club	Season	League			Cup		Europe		Other		Total	
Club	Season	League	Apps	Goals	Apps	Goals	Apps	Goals	Apps	Goals	Apps	Goals
Albissola (loan)	2018–19	Serie C	24	1	0	0	—		—		24	1
Viterbese	2019–20	Serie C	15	1	0	0	—		—		15	1
Viterbese	2020–21	Serie C	16	0	0	0	—		—		16	0
Career total			55	2	0	0	—		—		55	2
