= Simone Mattia =

Italian footballer

Personal information
- Date of birth: 19 January 1996 (age 30)
- Place of birth: Marino, Italy
- Height: 1.75 m (5 ft 9 in)
- Position: Right back

Team information
- Current team: Trastevere

Youth career
- 2014–2016: Lazio

Senior career*
| Years | Team | Apps | (Gls) |
| 2016–2018 | Sambenedettese | 24 | (1) |
| 2018–2019 | Rieti | 15 | (0) |
| 2019–2021 | Paganese | 52 | (2) |
| 2022 | Cannara | 3 | (0) |
| 2022–2024 | Flaminia | 52 | (2) |
| 2024– | Trastevere | 51 | (2) |
- * Club domestic league appearances and goals as of 22 Juny 2026

Simone Mattia (born 19 January 1996) is an Italian footballer who plays as a right back for Serie D club Trastevere.
