= Ignazio Battista =

Italian football player

Personal information
- Date of birth: 8 March 1997 (age 29)
- Place of birth: Taranto, Italy
- Height: 1.69 m (5 ft 6 1/2 in)
- Position: Forward

Team information
- Current team: Fasano

Youth career
- –2013: Taranto
- 2013–2015: Ternana

Senior career*
Years	Team	Apps	(Gls)
2015–2018	Ternana	7	(0)
2017	→ Viterbese (loan)	7	(0)
2017–2018	→ Matera (loan)	22	(1)
2018–2020	Gubbio	28	(1)
2020	Vibonese	6	(1)
2020	Audace Cerignola	2	(0)
2020–2021	Torres	17	(0)
2021–2024	Fasano	97	(20)
2024	Ischia	10	(2)
2024–	Fasano	1	(0)
- * Club domestic league appearances and goals as of 17 November 2024

Ignazio Battista (born 8 March 1997) is an Italian football player who plays for Serie D club Fasano.

== Club career ==
He made his Serie B debut for Ternana on 7 September 2016 in a game against Pisa.

On 31 January 2020, he signed a contract with Vibonese until the end of the 2019–20 season, with an option to extend it for the next season.
