= Pietro Arcidiacono =

Italian football player

Personal information
- Date of birth: 21 May 1988 (age 38)
- Place of birth: Catania, Italy
- Height: 1.69 m (5 ft 7 in)
- Position: Winger

Youth career
- –2007: Empoli

Senior career*
Years	Team	Apps	(Gls)
2007–2010	Empoli	3	(0)
2007–2008	→ Monza (loan)	31	(4)
2009–2010	→ Sorrento (loan)	24	(1)
2010–2011	Fidelis Andria	14	(0)
2011	Adrano	12	(5)
2011–2013	Nuova Cosenza	24	(14)
2013–2014	Vado	15	(6)
2014–2015	Martina Franca	49	(15)
2015–2016	Juve Stabia	16	(4)
2016	Foggia	10	(2)
2016–2017	Arezzo	30	(2)
2017–2018	Sicula Leonzio	30	(5)
2018–2019	Messina	29	(10)
2019–2020	Potenza	9	(1)
2020–2021	Messina	31	(9)
2021–2022	Giarre	29	(8)
2022–2023	Enna		
2023–2024	Siracusa	20	(4)
2024–2025	Gela		
2025–2026	US Arcella		
2026	Vittoria		

International career
2006	Italy U19	1	(0)
- * Club domestic league appearances and goals as of 30 September 2026

Pietro Arcidiacono (born 21 May 1988) is an Italian footballer who plays as a winger.

== Club career ==
He made his Serie B debut for Empoli on 30 August 2008 in a game against Brescia.

On 15 September 2018, he joined Serie D club Messina.

On 17 January 2020, his contract with Potenza was terminated by mutual consent. The next day, he returned to ACR Messina.

On 30 July 2021, he moved to Giarre in Serie D.

== Controversies ==
In November 2012 Arcidiacono, while playing for Cosenza, celebrated a goal displaying a shirt with "Speziale Innocente" written on it. This was because Arcidiacono is a childhood friend of Antonino Speziale, the young Catania supporter convicted of the murder of Filippo Raciti in the Catania incidents in 2007.

Following this episode, viewed as offensive for the memory of the late Raciti and of his family, Arcidiacono was given a DASPO, a football banning order, by the Police Director (Questore) of Catanzaro. This banning order, whilst impeding him to enter any football stadium in Italy, did not impact his career as a professional footballer.
