= Lamine Fofana =

Ivorian football player

Personal information
- Date of birth: 10 November 1998 (age 28)
- Place of birth: Bingerville, Ivory Coast
- Height: 1.75 m (5 ft 9 in)
- Position: Midfielder

Team information
- Current team: Nissa
- Number: 6

Youth career
- Floria 2000
- –2016: Tuttocuoio
- 2016–2017: Carpi

Senior career*
Years	Team	Apps	(Gls)
2017–2021	Carpi	55	(0)
2017	→ Sangiovannese (loan)	14	(2)
2017–2018	→ Savona (loan)	27	(0)
2018–2019	→ Fermana (loan)	31	(0)
2021–2023	Messina	69	(5)
2023–2024	Triestina	18	(1)
2025	Arzignano	10	(0)
2025–2026	Reggina	23	(1)
2026–	Nissa	0	(0)
- * Club domestic league appearances and goals as of 30 September 2026

Lamine Fofana (born 10 November 1998) is an Ivorian footballer who plays as a midfielder for Serie D club Nissa.

== Career ==
He made his Serie C debut for Fermana on 16 September 2018 in a game against Virtus Verona.

Fofana left Carpi at the end of 2020–21 season.

On 7 August 2021, he joined Messina on a two-year deal.
