= Daniel Bezziccheri =

Italian football player (born 1998)

Personal information
- Date of birth: 21 January 1998 (age 28)
- Place of birth: Rome, Italy
- Position: Forward

Team information
- Current team: Brindisi

Youth career
- –2017: Lazio

Senior career*
Years	Team	Apps	(Gls)
2017–2019	Lazio	0	(0)
2017–2018	→ Reggina (loan)	10	(0)
2018–2019	→ Albissola (loan)	25	(0)
2019–2021	Viterbese	48	(3)
2022	Pro Sesto	0	(0)
2022–2023	Chiasso	13	(1)
2023	Latina	0	(0)
2023–2024	Perugia	1	(0)
2024–	Brindisi	0	(0)

International career
2013	Italy U-16	1	(1)
2014	Italy U-17	2	(0)
2015	Italy U-18	4	(0)
- * Club domestic league appearances and goals as of 4 May 2024

Daniel Bezziccheri (born 21 January 1998) is an Italian football player who plays for Eccellenza Apulia club Brindisi.

== Club career ==
He made his Serie C debut for Reggina on 26 August 2017 in a game against Rende.

On 25 July 2019, he joined Viterbese.

On 11 August 2022, Bezziccheri signed with Chiasso in Switzerland.

On 31 January 2023, Bezziccheri moved to Serie C club Latina.
