= Alessandro Di Paolantonio =

Italian footballer (born 1992)

Personal information
- Date of birth: 31 December 1992 (age 33)
- Place of birth: Teramo, Italy
- Height: 1.75 m (5 ft 9 in)
- Position: Midfielder

Team information
- Current team: Monterosi
- Number: 7

Senior career*
Years	Team	Apps	(Gls)
2009–2012	San Nicolò		
2012–2017	Teramo	158	(17)
2017–2018	Ternana	0	(0)
2017–2018	→ Viterbese (loan)	32	(1)
2018–2020	Avellino	54	(9)
2020–2021	Arezzo	27	(4)
2021–	Monterosi	43	(4)
2022	→ Foggia (loan)	14	(1)
- * Club domestic league appearances and goals as of 6 May 2024

Alessandro Di Paolantonio (born 31 December 1992) is an Italian footballer who plays as a midfielder for Serie D club Monterosi.

== Career ==
Di Paolantonio made his Serie C debut for Teramo on 30 August 2014 in a game against Pisa.

On 9 November 2018, Di Paolantonio joined Avellino, in Serie D at the time and advanced with it to Serie C at the end of the 2018–19 season.

On 28 August 2021, Di Paolantonio signed with Monterosi, freshly promoted to Serie C. On 25 January 2022, he moved on loan to Foggia.
