= Thomas Bolis =

Italian football player

Personal information
- Date of birth: 2 August 1998 (age 28)
- Place of birth: Bergamo, Italy
- Height: 1.87 m (6 ft 2 in)
- Position: Midfielder

Team information
- Current team: Leon
- Number: 87

Youth career
- –2018: Atalanta

Senior career*
Years	Team	Apps	(Gls)
2018–2021	Atalanta	0	(0)
2018–2019	→ Triestina (loan)	16	(0)
2019–2020	→ Piacenza (loan)	16	(0)
2020–2021	→ Ravenna (loan)	8	(0)
2021–2022	Carpi	23	(3)
2022–2023	Castellanzese	23	(3)
2023–2024	Caravaggio	34	(3)
2024–2025	Casatese Merate	37	(3)
2025–	Leon	17	(1)
- * Club domestic league appearances and goals as of 22 February 2026

Thomas Bolis (born 2 August 1998) is an Italian football player who plays for Serie D side Leon.

== Club career ==
=== Atalanta ===
Born in Bergamo, Bolis was a youth exponent of Atalanta. On 29 April 2018, he was called up to the senior squad's official game for the first time, for Serie A match against Genoa, but remained on the bench. but did not appear on the field. In May 2018 he received a second call up for a match against Lazio but he remained again on the bench.

==== Loan to Triestina ====
On 6 August 2018, Bolis was signed by Serie C club Triestina on loan for the entire 2018–19 season. On 26 September he made his professional debut in Serie C for Triestina as a substitute replacing Tommaso Coletti in the 75th minute of a 3–0 home win over Ravenna. Three weeks later, on 17 October, Bolis played his first and only entire match for the club, a 2–0 away defeat against Südtirol. He also helped the club to reach the play-off finals, however Triestina lost 5–3 on aggregate against Pisa. Bolis ended his season-long loan to Triestina with 17 appearances, including only 3 of them as a starter, and 1 assist.

==== Loan to Piacenza ====
On 12 July 2019, Bolis was loaned to Serie C side Piacenza on a season-long loan deal. On 4 August he made his debut for Piacenza in a match won 3–2 at penalties after a 1–1 home draw against Viterbese Castrense in the first round of Coppa Italia, he played the entire match. On 25 August he made his league debut for the club as a substitute replacing Davide Zappella in the 76th minute of a 0–0 away draw against Arzignano. On 8 September, Bolis played his first match as a starter for the club, a 3–1 away win over Triestina, he was replaced by Hamza El Kaouakibi in the 67th minute. On 25 September he played his first entire match, a 3–1 home win over Ravenna. Bolis ended his loan to Piacenza with 17 appearances, 7 of them as a starter.

==== Loan to Ravenna ====
On 27 September 2020 Bolis joined Serie C club Ravenna on a season-long loan deal. One week later, on 4 October, he made his debut for the club as a starter in a 1–0 away defeat against Legnago Salus, he was replaced by Marco Fiorani in the 46th minute. However in November 2020 in a match against Sambenedettese he suffered an anterior cruciate ligament injury, he was out for the rest of the season and he was in recovery until August 2021. Bolis ended early his season with 8 appearances, including 5 of them as a starter, and one assist.

== Career statistics ==
=== Club ===
As of 11 April 2021

Club	Season	League			Cup		Europe		Other		Total	
Club	Season	League	Apps	Goals	Apps	Goals	Apps	Goals	Apps	Goals	Apps	Goals
Triestina (loan)	2018–19	Serie C	16	0	0	0	—		1 (Note: All appearance(s) in Serie C play-off.)	0	17	0
Piacenza (loan)	2019–20	Serie C	16	0	1	0	—		—		17	0
Ravenna (loan)	2020–21	Serie C	8	0	0	0	—		—		8	0
Career total			40	0	1	0	—		1	0	41	0
