= Gianluca Nicco =

Italian footballer (born 1988)

Personal information
- Date of birth: 10 August 1988 (age 38)
- Place of birth: Ivrea, Italy
- Height: 1.83 m (6 ft 0 in)
- Position: Midfielder

Team information
- Current team: Alessandria

Youth career
- Juventus
- 2005–2006: Ivrea

Senior career*
Years	Team	Apps	(Gls)
2006–2009	Ivrea	57	(1)
2009–2010	Mantova	26	(1)
2010–2013	Pescara	29	(0)
2012	→ Frosinone (loan)	12	(0)
2013–2015	Perugia	69	(6)
2015–2018	Alessandria	93	(6)
2018–2021	Piacenza	53	(4)
2020–2021	→ Pro Patria (loan)	33	(1)
2021–2025	Pro Patria	133	(5)
2025–	Alessandria	0	(0)

International career^{‡}
2008	Italy U-20 Lega Pro	1	(0)
- * Club domestic league appearances and goals as of 25 April 2025 ‡ National team caps and goals as of 20 July 2011

Gianluca Nicco (born 10 August 1988) is an Italian footballer who plays as a midfielder for Eccellenza club Alessandria.

== Club career ==
After the bankruptcy of Mantova, he joined Serie B newcomer Pescara on 22 July 2010.

On 31 January 2012, Nicco signed a loan deal with Frosinone until the end of the 2011–12 season. Nicco was suspended for 3 years due to 2011 Italian football scandal. However it was shorten to 1-year by the appeal court of FIGC. Nicco appealed to the Tribunale Nazionale di Arbitrato per lo Sport of CONI. On 17 December 2012 the ban was shorten to 6 months, which would end on 31 December 2012.

He joined Perugia on 3 January 2013.

In the 2015–16 season he signed for Alessandria.

On 29 September 2020 he joined Pro Patria on loan with an option to purchase.

On 24 June 2021, he moved to Pro Patria on a permanent basis and signed a two-year contract.

== International career ==
He played for Italy under-20 Lega Pro representative team in 2008–09 Mirop Cup. He also finished as the runner-up in 2008 Trofeo Dossena with the representative team, but not played in the final against Grêmio youth team.

In 2009–10 season he was call-up to the training session of Italy under-21 Serie B representative team.

== Honours ==
=== Club ===
Alessandria

- Coppa Italia Serie C: 2017–18
