= Francesco Marano =

Italian footballer

Personal information
- Date of birth: 27 May 1990 (age 36)
- Place of birth: Castellammare di Stabia, Italy
- Height: 1.82 m (6 ft 0 in)
- Position: Midfielder

Team information
- Current team: Meda

Youth career
- Napoli
- Juve Stabia

Senior career*
Years	Team	Apps	(Gls)
2007–2011	Juve Stabia	15	(1)
2011–2013	Aversa	51	(0)
2013–2015	Casertana	54	(4)
2015–2016	Benevento	2	(0)
2016	Casertana	9	(1)
2016–2017	Viterbese	18	(6)
2017	→ Melfi (loan)	15	(3)
2017–2019	Sicula Leonzio	61	(8)
2019–2020	Como	21	(3)
2020–2023	Renate	90	(5)
2023–2024	Pro Patria	26	(0)
2024–	Meda	0	(0)
- * Club domestic league appearances and goals as of 3 May 2024

Francesco Marano (born 27 May 1990) is an Italian professional footballer who plays as a midfielder for Meda.

== Club career ==
On 28 September 2020, he joined Renate.
