= Giacomo Modica =

Italian footballer and manager

Personal information
- Date of birth: 31 May 1964 (age 62)
- Place of birth: Mazara del Vallo, Italy
- Height: 1.70 m (5 ft 7 in)
- Position: Midfielder

Team information
- Current team: Ħamrun Spartans (head coach)

Senior career*
Years	Team	Apps	(Gls)
1981–1984	Palermo	20	(1)
1984–1985	Turris	26	(4)
1985–1988	Licata	87	(11)
1988–1990	Messina	72	(2)
1990–1992	Palermo	63	(11)
1992–1994	Padova	44	(3)
1994–1995	Acireale	61	(6)
1995–1996	Ancona	29	(2)
1996–1998	Ternana	58	(6)
1998–1999	Atletico Catania	27	(2)

Managerial career
- 2004–2005: Cosenza
- 2006–2007: Melfi
- 2007–2011: Celano
- 2012: Lecco
- 2016: L'Aquila
- 2016–2017: Mazara
- 2017–2018: Messina
- 2018–2019: Cavese
- 2019–2020: Vibonese
- 2020: Cavese
- 2021–2022: Casale
- 2022–2023: Vibonese
- 2023–2025: Messina
- 2025–: Ħamrun Spartans
- * Club domestic league appearances and goals

Giacomo Modica (born 31 May 1964) is an Italian football manager and former midfielder

== Career ==
=== As manager ===
After a playing career spent with several Serie B and Serie C1 teams, most notably Palermo and Padova, he moved into coaching, working as Zdeněk Zeman's assistant for six years (even following him at Fenerbahçe) before becoming a head coach himself. In 2004, he worked for Serie D team Cosenza with little fortune; he then worked for Serie C2 teams Melfi in 2006 and Celano the following year, leading the latter to an impressive season and a spot in the promotion playoffs.

He agreed a one-year extension to his contract with Celano in July 2010. He left the club at the end of the 2010–11 season, the club citing excessive wage demands as the main reason behind the decision.

On 17 January 2012 he was appointed new head coach of last-placed Lega Pro Seconda Divisione club Lecco in place of dismissed predecessor Maurizio Pellegrino. He avoided direct relegation but eventually failed to keep the club into professionalism after losing a playoff to Mantova, and left the club by the end of the season to reunite with Zdeněk Zeman at Roma, where he worked as technical collaborator for the 2012–13 season. After Zeman's dismissal as head coach, he left Roma too, and re-joined his mentor in July 2014 as technical collaborator of Cagliari.

In April 2016 he was named as new head coach of Lega Pro club L'Aquila in place of Carlo Perrone, only to be dismissed himself after less than a month in charge.

On 1 September 2016, Modica was announced as the new head coach of hometown club Mazara, in what was his first time with the club from his native city, as well as his first time in charge of a club in Eccellenza (second-highest level of amateur football in Italy).

He successively served as head coach of Serie D club Messina in the 2017–18 season.

He left Messina for Cavese (Serie D, soon to be readmitted to Serie C to fill vacancies) for the 2018–19 campaign, guiding the club to a mid-table placement in the league, then leaving the club by mutual consent by the end of the season.

On 13 July 2019, he was unveiled as head coach of Serie C club Vibonese.

On 3 July 2020, he was hired again by Cavese. On 11 November 2020, he resigned from Cavese following a bad start for the season, with the club in the relegation zone.

In December 2021, he was appointed new head coach of Serie D club Casale. He resigned from his position on 27 February 2022, after achieving only ten points in his eight games in charge.

On 23 July 2022, Modica agreed to return to Vibonese following the club's relegation to Serie D.

On 8 July 2023, Modica was appointed as the new head coach of Messina in the Serie C league. After saving the club from relegation and being confirmed in charge of Messina for the following season, Modica resigned on 20 January 2025 following a club takeover, leaving Messina in third-last place in the league table.

On 1 June 2025, Modica was unveiled as the new head coach of Maltese Premier League champions Ħamrun Spartans. In his first games in charge, Modica guided his club to eliminate Žalgiris in the first qualifying round of the 2025–26 UEFA Champions League, and eventually guide Ħamrun Spartans to become the first Maltese club ever to qualify to the group stage of a European competition after eliminating RFS in the playoff round of the 2025–26 UEFA Conference League.
