= Ivo Molnar =

Croatian footballer

Personal information
- Date of birth: 29 July 1994 (age 32)
- Place of birth: Rijeka, Croatia
- Height: 1.90 m (6 ft 3 in)
- Position: Centre-back

Team information
- Current team: FBC Gravina
- Number: 24

Youth career
- Rijeka
- 2009–2011: Inter Milan

Senior career*
Years	Team	Apps	(Gls)
2011–2012	Inter Milan	0	(0)
2011–2012	→ Voghera (loan)	28	(1)
2012–2013	Olginatese	22	(1)
2013–2014	Pistoiese	23	(0)
2014–2015	Castiglione	25	(0)
2015–2016	Monza	30	(1)
2016–2017	Dro Alto Garda	30	(4)
2017–2020	Pro Patria	64	(2)
2020–2024	Arzignano	104	(4)
2024	Virtus Francavilla	4	(0)
2024–2025	Caldiero Terme	19	(0)
2025–	FBC Gravina	14	(2)

International career
2008	Croatia U14	2	(0)
2009	Croatia U15	2	(0)
2010	Croatia U16	2	(0)
2010	Croatia U17	6	(0)
- * Club domestic league appearances and goals as of 26 April 2026

Ivo Molnar (born 29 July 1994) is a Croatian footballer who plays as a centre back for Italian Serie D club FBC Gravina.

== Club career ==
A youth product of Rijeka and Inter Milan, Molnar began his professional career in a year long loan with Voghera in the Serie D. He spent his early career with various other Serie D clubs, moving to Olginatese, Pistoiese, Castiglione, Monza, Dro Calcio, and Pro Patria. He helped Pro Patria get promoted into the Serie C. He made his professional debut with Pro Patria in a 2–1 Serie C win over Pistoiese on 16 September 2017. On 26 August 2020, he transferred to Arzignano.

On 23 January 2024, Molnar signed with Serie C club Virtus Francavilla.

On 8 August 2024, Molnar joined Caldiero Terme on a one-season contract.
