= Ermanno Fumagalli =

Italian footballer (born 1982)

Personal information
- Date of birth: 23 March 1982 (age 44)
- Place of birth: Treviglio, Italy
- Height: 1.80 m (5 ft 11 in)
- Position: Goalkeeper

Youth career
- Fiorenzuola

Senior career*
Years	Team	Apps	(Gls)
1999–2002	Fiorenzuola	48	(0)
2000–2001	→ Fanfulla (loan)	34	(0)
2002–2003	Messina Peloro	0	(0)
2003–2004	Teramo	0	(0)
2004–2006	Melfi	71	(0)
2006–2007	Valenzana Mado	32	(0)
2007–2010	Marcianise	65	(0)
2010–2011	Juve Stabia	20	(0)
2011–2013	Avellino	52	(0)
2013–2015	Casertana	71	(0)
2015–2017	Pro Piacenza	72	(0)
2017–2019	Piacenza Calcio	71	(0)
2019–2021	Foggia	56	(0)
2021–2022	Seregno	19	(0)
2022–2023	Viterbese	34	(0)
2023–2024	ACR Messina	53	(0)
- * Club domestic league appearances and goals as of 5 May 2024

Ermanno Fumagalli (born 23 March 1982) is an Italian professional footballer who plays as a goalkeeper.

== Club career ==
Born in Treviglio, Fumagalli started his career in U.S. Fiorenzuola, made his debut in 1999–2000 season.

He was part of Avellino team who won the 2012–13 Lega Pro Prima Divisione Group B.

On 27 July 2021, he joined Seregno Calcio.

On 7 January 2022, he moved to Viterbese.

On 5 January 2023, Fumagalli signed with ACR Messina.

== Honours ==
Avelino

- Lega Pro Prima Divisione: 2012–13 (Girone B)
