= Luca Guidetti =

Italian footballer

Personal information
- Date of birth: 6 May 1986 (age 40)
- Place of birth: Milan, Italy
- Height: 1.83 m (6 ft 0 in)
- Position: Midfielder

Team information
- Current team: Varesina

Youth career
- 2004–2006: Como

Senior career*
Years	Team	Apps	(Gls)
2006–2008	Como	34	(1)
2008–2011	Renate	59	(2)
2011–2013	Folgore Caratese	61	(9)
2013–2016	Caronnese	100	(16)
2016–2019	Monza	84	(5)
2019–2022	FeralpiSalò	88	(8)
2022–2023	Sangiuliano	12	(0)
2023	Alessandria	13	(0)
2023–	Varesina	0	(0)
- * Club domestic league appearances and goals as of 23 April 2023

Luca Guidetti (born 6 May 1986) is an Italian footballer who plays for Serie D club Varesina.

== Club career ==
On 8 January 2019, he signed a 1.5-year contract with FeralpiSalò.

On 11 January 2023, Guidetti moved to Alessandria.

== Honours ==
=== Club ===
Monza

- Serie D: 2016-17
- Scudetto Dilettanti: 2016-17
