= Davide Mordini =

Italian footballer (born 1996)

Personal information
- Date of birth: 3 August 1996 (age 30)
- Place of birth: Recanati, Italy
- Height: 1.78 m (5 ft 10 in)
- Position: Defender

Team information
- Current team: Recanatese
- Number: 3

Youth career
- –2015: Cesena

Senior career*
Years	Team	Apps	(Gls)
2015–2018	Cesena	3	(0)
2015–2016	→ Santarcangelo (loan)	8	(0)
2016–2017	→ Recanatese (loan)	27	(3)
2018	→ Mestre (loan)	6	(0)
2018–2020	FeralpiSalò	39	(1)
2020–2022	Fermana	50	(0)
2022	→ Teramo (loan)	16	(0)
2022–2024	Olbia	16	(0)
2024–	Recanatese	8	(0)
- * Club domestic league appearances and goals as of 10 November 2024

Davide Mordini (born 3 August 1996) is an Italian footballer who plays as a defender for Serie D club Recanatese.

== Club career ==
He made his Serie C debut for Santarcangelo on 7 September 2015 in a game against Arezzo.

On 3 August 2020 he signed a 2-year contract with Fermana. On 10 January 2022, he joined Teramo on loan.

In November 2022, Mordini signed for Olbia on a contract until June 2023.
