= Giuseppe Sicurella =

Italian footballer

Personal information
- Date of birth: 28 May 1994 (age 32)
- Place of birth: Mazara del Vallo, Italy
- Height: 1.78 m (5 ft 10 in)
- Position: Midfielder

Team information
- Current team: Paganese (on loan from Scafatese)
- Number: 25

Youth career
- Aurora Mimmo Cremona
- –2011: Mazara
- 2010–2011: Lecce
- 2011–2013: Casale
- 2013: → Novara (loan)

Senior career*
Years	Team	Apps	(Gls)
2010–2011	Mazara		
2012–2013	Casale	5	(0)
2013–2019	Foggia	53	(5)
2016	→ Lumezzane (loan)	0	(0)
2017–2018	→ Virtus Francavilla (loan)	35	(3)
2018	→ Pro Piacenza (loan)	15	(1)
2019–2020	Sicula Leonzio	25	(2)
2020–2021	Grosseto	37	(5)
2021–2022	Arezzo	26	(2)
2022	Nuova Florida	12	(1)
2022–2023	Paganese	18	(0)
2023	Martina	9	(0)
2023–2024	Gelbison	15	(1)
2024–2025	Matera	32	(6)
2025–	Scafatese	23	(2)
2026–	→ Paganese (loan)	0	(0)
- * Club domestic league appearances and goals as of 3 May 2026

Giuseppe Sicurella (born 28 May 1994) is an Italian footballer who plays as a midfielder for Serie D club Paganese on loan from Scafatese.

== Club career ==
He made his Serie C debut for Foggia on 12 September 2014 in a game against Melfi.

He returned from his loan at Pro Piacenza to Foggia in January 2019 as Pro Piacenza experienced financial difficulties.

On 17 July 2019 he signed with Sicula Leonzio.

On 25 September 2020 he joined Grosseto.

On 27 August 2021 he joined Serie D club Arezzo.
