= Mattia Tirelli =

Italian footballer

Personal information
- Date of birth: 30 June 2002 (age 24)
- Place of birth: Villanuova sul Clisi, Italy
- Height: 1.83 m (6 ft 0 in)
- Position: Forward

Team information
- Current team: Virtus Entella
- Number: 17

Youth career
- –2021: Feralpisalò
- 2020–2021: → Fiorentina (loan)

Senior career*
Years	Team	Apps	(Gls)
2018–2022	Feralpisalò	10	(2)
2021–2022	→ Real Calepina (loan)	27	(7)
2022–2023	Brusaporto	33	(4)
2023–2024	Ravenna	31	(13)
2024–2025	Ascoli	19	(1)
2025	Giana Erminio	11	(4)
2025–2026	Monopoli	24	(6)
2026–	Virtus Entella	15	(2)
- * Club domestic league appearances and goals as of 13 May 2026

Mattia Tirelli (born 30 June 2002) is an Italian professional footballer who plays as a forward for Serie B club Virtus Entella.

== Club career ==
Formed in Feralpisalò youth system, Tirelli made his debut for the first team in 2018–19 Serie C season. On 6 October 2020, he was loaned to ACF Fiorentina Youth Sector.

On 5 November 2021 he was loaned to Serie D club Real Calepina.

On 15 July 2024, Tirelli signed with Ascoli for one season.

On 2 February 2026, Tirelli moved to Virtus Entella in Serie B.
