= Samuele Neglia =

Italian footballer

Personal information
- Date of birth: 11 August 1991 (age 35)
- Place of birth: Turin, Italy
- Height: 1.64 m (5 ft 5 in)
- Position: Winger

Team information
- Current team: Giulianova

Youth career
- Salernitana

Senior career*
Years	Team	Apps	(Gls)
2010–2011	Sapri	27	(5)
2011–2013	Paganese	30	(1)
2013–2014	Melfi	31	(3)
2014–2017	Viterbese	94	(32)
2017–2018	Siena	24	(1)
2018–2021	Bari	42	(10)
2020–2021	→ Fermana (loan)	38	(13)
2021–2022	Reggiana	25	(5)
2022–2024	Cerignola	29	(2)
2023	→ Fermana (loan)	12	(1)
2024	→ Virtus Francavilla (loan)	11	(1)
2024–2025	Scafatese	23	(5)
2025–2026	Maceratese	11	(2)
2026–	Giulianova	2	(0)
- * Club domestic league appearances and goals as of 1 March 2026

Samuele Neglia (born 11 August 1991) is an Italian professional footballer who plays as a winger for Serie D club Giulianova.

== Career ==
Born in Turin, Neglia started his career in Salernitana youth sector.

As a senior, in 2010 he moved to Sapri on Serie D.

For the 2011–12 season, he signed with Serie C2 club Paganese. Neglia made his professional debut on 4 September 2011 against Celano. This season, the club won the promotion to Serie C.

In 2014 he joined to Viterbese.

In August 2018, he joined to Bari in Serie D. Neglia won the promotion with the team this season.

On 4 October 2020, he was loaned to Fermana. He left Bari at the end of the season.

On 15 July 2021, he signed with Serie C club Reggiana.

On 12 August 2022, Neglia joined Cerignola. On 31 January 2023, he returned to Fermana on loan. On 1 February 2024, Neglia was loaned by Virtus Francavilla.

== Personal life ==
In 2019, Neglia graduated as a psychologist.
