= Alessio Viola =

Italian footballer (born 1990)

Personal information
- Full name: Alessio Pasquale Viola
- Date of birth: 26 December 1990 (age 35)
- Place of birth: Oppido Mamertina, Italy
- Height: 1.69 m (5 ft 7 in)
- Position: Striker

Senior career*
Years	Team	Apps	(Gls)
2008–2015	Reggina	79	(21)
2010	→ Monza (loan)	12	(4)
2010–2011	→ Benevento (loan)	3	(0)
2013	→ Carpi (loan)	10	(2)
2013–2014	→ AlbinoLeffe (loan)	12	(2)
2014	→ Frosinone (loan)	5	(2)
2015–2016	Foggia	12	(0)
2016–2017	Taranto	32	(8)
2017–2018	Virtus Francavilla	15	(2)
2018–2019	Reggina	13	(3)
2020 - present	Cittanovese		

International career
2006	Italy U-16	2	(0)
2007	Italy U-17	5	(1)
2011	Italy U-21 Serie B	3	(0)
- * Club domestic league appearances and goals as of 21 January 2019

Alessio Pasquale Viola (born 26 December 1990) is an Italian professional footballer who plays as a striker.

== Career ==
Viola made his Serie A debut for Reggina on 31 May 2009 in a game against Siena when he came on as a substitute in the 69th minute for his older brother Benito Nicolas Viola.

On 25 January 2011, he returned to Reggina from loan.

In 2013, he left for AlbinoLeffe. On 31 January 2014, he was signed by Frosinone, with Salvatore Aurelio moved to AlbinoLeffe.

On 23 July 2015, he joined Foggia for free.

He returned to his first club Reggina on 7 August 2018, signing a two-year contract. On 19 April 2019, his contract was dissolved by mutual consent following a knee surgery several days earlier.
