= Domenico Mungo =

Italian footballer (born 1993)

Personal information
- Date of birth: 18 January 1993 (age 33)
- Place of birth: Castelnovo ne' Monti, Italy
- Height: 1.74 m (5 ft 9 in)
- Position: Midfielder

Team information
- Current team: Puteolana
- Number: 7

Youth career
- –2011: Parma

Senior career*
Years	Team	Apps	(Gls)
2011–2012	Pro Piacenza		
2012–2013	Chieti	31	(5)
2013–2015	Parma	0	(0)
2013–2014	→ Perugia (loan)	6	(0)
2014	→ Viareggio (loan)	12	(1)
2014–2015	→ Pistoiese (loan)	32	(5)
2015–2016	Pistoiese	32	(7)
2016–2019	Cosenza	101	(11)
2019–2022	Teramo	78	(4)
2022–2023	Viterbese	50	(3)
2023–2024	Reggina	30	(3)
2024–2025	Puteolana	9	(1)
- * Club domestic league appearances and goals as of 10 Agoust 2025

Domenico Mungo (born 18 January 1993) is an Italian football player who plays for Serie D club Puteolana.

== Club career ==
He is the product of Parma youth teams. He made his senior debut in Serie D in the 2012–12 season for Pro Piacenza.

Next season, he made his debut on the professional level in Lega Pro Seconda Divisione for Chieti on 2 September 2012 in a game against Pontedera.

After that season he returned to Parma, but never made an appearance for them, going on a string of Serie C loans for the next two seasons.

On 5 August 2016, he signed a two-year contract with Serie C club Cosenza. For 2018–19 Cosenza advanced to Serie B and Mungo re-signed with them for another season, making his second-tier debut soon thereafter.

On 5 August 2019, he signed a three-year contract with Teramo.

On 31 January 2022, Mungo moved to Viterbese.

On 16 September 2023, he signed a two-year contract with Serie D club Reggina.
