= Francesco Puntoriere =

Italian footballer

Personal information
- Date of birth: 23 April 1998 (age 28)
- Place of birth: Reggio Calabria, Italy
- Height: 1.79 m (5 ft 10 in)
- Position: Forward

Team information
- Current team: ASD Digiesse PraiaTortora

Youth career
- –2015: Reggina
- 2015–2017: Virtus Entella

Senior career*
Years	Team	Apps	(Gls)
2016–2019	Virtus Entella	5	(0)
2017–2018	→ Catanzaro (loan)	24	(0)
2019	→ Virtus Francavilla (loan)	11	(2)
2019–2022	Virtus Francavilla	22	(2)
2020	→ Virtus Verona (loan)	1	(0)
2022	RG Ticino	20	(2)
2022–2023	Lavello	26	(4)
2023	Gravina	11	(0)
2023–2024	USD Palmese	9	(1)
2024–2025	Lavagnese	20	(2)
2025–2026	Pro Pellaro		
2026–	ASD Digiesse PraiaTortora	0	(0)

International career
2016	Italy U18	4	(1)
2016	Italy U19	3	(0)
- * Club domestic league appearances and goals as of 12:01, 26 September 2026 (UTC)

Francesco Puntoriere (born 23 April 1998) is an Italian footballer who plays as a forward for ASD Digiesse PraiaTortora.

== Club career ==
He made his Serie B debut for Virtus Entella on 1 March 2016 in a game against Salernitana.

On 31 January 2019, he joined Virtus Francavilla on loan.

On 30 August 2019, he returned to Virtus Francavilla on a permanent basis. On 31 January 2020, he was loaned to Virtus Verona until the end of the season.

On 12 January 2022, his contract with Virtus Francavilla was terminated by mutual consent and he moved to Serie D club RG Ticino.
