= Mattia Proietti =

Italian footballer

Personal information
- Date of birth: 27 February 1992 (age 34)
- Place of birth: Turin, Italy
- Height: 1.80 m (5 ft 11 in)
- Position: Midfielder

Youth career
- –2010: Juventus

Senior career*
Years	Team	Apps	(Gls)
2010–2011	Vallée d'Aoste	33	(2)
2011–2017	Bassano	165	(10)
2017–2019	Pescara	4	(0)
2018–2019	→ Teramo (loan)	33	(2)
2019–2023	Ternana	94	(5)
2023–2024	Casertana	25	(1)
2024–2025	Gubbio	22	(0)
2025–2026	Ternana	10	(0)
- * Club domestic league appearances and goals as of 30 April 2026

Mattia Proietti (born 27 February 1992) is an Italian professional footballer who plays as a midfielder.

== Club career ==
He made his Serie C debut for Bassano on 4 September 2011 in a game against Virtus Lanciano.

On 10 July 2019, he signed a 3-year contract with Ternana.

On 8 September 2023, Proietti moved to Casertana.

On 23 July 2024, Proietti joined Gubbio.
