= Stefano Casarotto =

Italian footballer

Personal information
- Date of birth: 13 June 1996 (age 30)
- Place of birth: Dolo, Italy
- Height: 1.73 m (5 ft 8 in)
- Position: Midfielder

Team information
- Current team: Mestre
- Number: 7

Senior career*
Years	Team	Apps	(Gls)
2013–2015	Union Pro	>29	(>4)
2015–2018	Mestre	84	(6)
2018–2020	Virtus Verona	54	(2)
2020–2021	Mestre	34	(6)
2021–2022	Clodiense	24	(0)
2022–2023	Luparense	19	(0)
2023–	Mestre	16	(0)
- * Club domestic league appearances and goals as of 21 December 2023

Stefano Casarotto (born 13 June 1996) is an Italian professional footballer who plays as midfielder for Serie D club Mestre.
