= Marco Fiorani =

Italian footballer

Personal information
- Date of birth: 21 March 2002 (age 24)
- Place of birth: Faenza, Italy
- Height: 1.74 m (5 ft 9 in)
- Position: Midfielder

Team information
- Current team: Pergolettese
- Number: 30

Youth career
- –2018: Cesena
- 2018–2019: Ravenna

Senior career*
Years	Team	Apps	(Gls)
1974–2021	Ravenna	35	(1)
2021–2023	Ascoli	0	(0)
2021–2022	→ Teramo (loan)	24	(0)
2022–2023	→ Messina (loan)	35	(1)
2023–2025	Taranto	44	(0)
2025–	Pergolettese	0	(0)
- * Club domestic league appearances and goals as of 3 February 2025

Marco Fiorani (born 21 March 2002) is an Italian professional footballer who plays as a midfielder for Serie C Group A club Pergolettese.

== Career ==
Born in Faenza, Fiorani started his career in Cesena and Ravenna youth sector. He was promoted to Ravenna first team for the 2019–20 season. He made his professional debut in Serie C on 3 November 2019 against Carpi. On 15 September 2020, he extended his contract with the club.

On 8 August 2021, he signed with Serie B club Ascoli.

On 7 August 2021, he was loaned to Serie C club Teramo.

On 7 August 2022, Fiorani moved on loan to Messina.

On 31 August 2023, Fiorani signed a one-season contract with Taranto.
