= Domenico Franco =

Italian football player (born 1992)

Personal information
- Date of birth: 9 September 1992 (age 34)
- Place of birth: Castrovillari, Italy
- Height: 1.82 m (6 ft 0 in)
- Position: Midfielder

Team information
- Current team: Barletta
- Number: 16

Youth career
- –2010: Salernitana
- 2011–2012: Chievo

Senior career*
Years	Team	Apps	(Gls)
2010–2011	Salernitana	9	(0)
2012–2013	Paganese	17	(0)
2013–2014	Chievo	0	(0)
2013	→ Paganese (loan)	15	(0)
2014	→ Messina (loan)	9	(0)
2014–2015	Roccella	20	(0)
2015–2016	Aversa Normanna	35	(5)
2016–2017	Monopoli	20	(1)
2017–2019	Rende	65	(8)
2019–2020	Cesena	22	(2)
2020–2022	Virtus Francavilla	57	(1)
2022–2023	Lucchese	29	(1)
2023–2024	Messina	31	(1)
2024–2025	Picerno	32	(2)
2025	Sorrento	12	(0)
2025–	Barletta	16	(0)
- * Club domestic league appearances and goals as of 11 January 2026

Domenico Franco (born 9 September 1992) is an Italian football player who plays for Serie C club Barletta.

== Club career ==
He made his Serie B debut for Salernitana on 15 May 2010 in a game against Sassuolo.

On 16 July 2019, he signed a 2-year contract with Cesena.

On 28 July 2020 he moved to Virtus Francavilla.

On 9 August 2022, Franco signed a one-year contract, with an option to extend, with Lucchese.

On 27 August 2023, Franco returned to Messina on a two-year deal.

On 23 August 2024, Franco moved to Picerno on a two-year contract.
