= Lorenzo Borri =

Italian footballer

Personal information
- Date of birth: 24 September 1997 (age 29)
- Place of birth: Poggibonsi, Italy
- Height: 1.89 m (6 ft 2 in)
- Position: Centre back

Team information
- Current team: Poggibonsi

Youth career
- –2014: Empoli

Senior career*
Years	Team	Apps	(Gls)
2014–2015	Sangimignano	30	(1)
2015–2016	Poggibonsi	24	(1)
2016–2019	Pontedera	58	(2)
2019	Juve Stabia	0	(0)
2019–2020	Piacenza	8	(0)
2020–2021	Carrarese	30	(0)
2021–2024	Monterosi	44	(0)
2024–2025	Livorno	9	(0)
2025–	Poggibonsi	0	(0)
- * Club domestic league appearances and goals as of 4 May 2025

Lorenzo Borri (born 24 September 1997) is an Italian professional footballer who plays as a centre back for Serie D club Poggibonsi.

== Club career ==
On 22 July 2021 he joined Monterosi.
