= Marco Manetta =

Italian footballer

Personal information
- Date of birth: 14 July 1991 (age 35)
- Place of birth: Tivoli, Italy
- Height: 1.83 m (6 ft 0 in)
- Position: Centre back

Team information
- Current team: Barletta

Youth career
- –2008: Lazio
- 2008–2009: Frosinone

Senior career*
Years	Team	Apps	(Gls)
2009	Monterotondo	7	(0)
2009–2011	Matera	32	(0)
2011	Paganese	0	(0)
2011–2012	Gaeta	2	(0)
2012	Anziolavinio	15	(0)
2012–2013	Anziolavinio	12	(0)
2013–2014	Olbia	4	(0)
2014–2016	Isola Liri	48	(2)
2016	Città Castello	9	(0)
2016–2017	Potenza	16	(0)
2017–2018	ACR Messina	27	(0)
2018–2019	Cavese	26	(0)
2019–2021	Fermana	51	(2)
2021–2022	Vis Pesaro	18	(1)
2022–2023	Taranto	26	(1)
2023–2025	ACR Messina	51	(1)
2025	Picerno	15	(0)
2025–	Barletta	0	(0)
- * Club domestic league appearances and goals as of 27 April 2025

Marco Manetta (born 14 July 1991) is an Italian professional footballer who plays as a centre back for Serie D club Barletta.

== Career ==
Born in Tivoli, Manetta developed as a player in Lazio and Frosinone youth sector. As a Senior, he played for Serie D and Lega Pro Seconda Divisione clubs.

=== Serie C ===
On 12 August 2018, he moved to Serie C club Cavese. Manetta made his Serie C debut on 22 September against Virtus Francavilla.

On 25 July 2019, he joined Fermana. In August 2020, he extended his contract by a year.

On 23 July 2021, he signed with Vis Pesaro.

On 20 July 2023, Manetta returned to ACR Messina on a two-year contract.
