= Christian Tommasini =

Italian footballer (born 1998)

Personal information
- Date of birth: 14 March 1998 (age 28)
- Place of birth: Castel San Pietro Terme, Italy
- Height: 1.78 m (5 ft 10 in)
- Position: Forward

Team information
- Current team: Treviso

Youth career
- –2015: Cesena
- 2015–2018: Sampdoria
- 2016–2017: → Cesena (loan)

Senior career*
Years	Team	Apps	(Gls)
2017–2018	→ Mezzolara (loan)	37	(6)
2018–2021	Pontedera	64	(13)
2021–2023	Pisa	0	(0)
2021	→ Imolese (loan)	17	(2)
2021–2022	→ Fiorenzuola (loan)	12	(1)
2022	→ Paganese (loan)	16	(7)
2022–2023	→ Taranto (loan)	31	(8)
2023–2024	Pescara	9	(2)
2024	→ Monopoli (loan)	17	(5)
2024–2026	Gubbio	52	(12)
2026	Foggia	13	(1)
2026–	Treviso	0	(0)
- * Club domestic league appearances and goals as of 1 May 2026

Christian Tommasini (born 14 March 1998) is an Italian professional footballer who plays as a forward for Serie C club Treviso.

== Club career ==
Tommasini was transferred as a youth to Sampdoria from Cesena. He was loaned to Serie D club Mezzolara for the 2017–18 season.

On 28 July 2018, Tommasini was transferred to Serie C club Pontedera where he spent three seasons.

On 24 January 2021 the forward joined Pisa, and was immediately loaned to Imolese.

On 28 July 2021, he joined to Fiorenzuola on loan.

On 21 January 2022, he went to Paganese on loan.

On 5 August 2023, he joined Pescara on permanent basis.

On 18 January 2024, Tommasini was loaned to Monopoli.

On 22 August 2024, Franchini moved to Gubbio on permanent basis.
