= 2021–22 FC Crotone season =

Crotone
2021–22 season
- Chairman: Gianni Vrenna
- Head coach: Francesco Modesto (until 29 October); Pasquale Marino (from 29 October to 10 December); Francesco Modesto (from 10 December)
- Stadium: Stadio Ezio Scida
- Serie B: 19th (relegated)
- Coppa Italia: Round of 64
- Top goalscorer: League: Mirko Marić (11); All: Mirko Marić (11)
Home colours	Away colours	Third colours

The 2021–22 season was F.C. Crotone's first season back in second division of the Italian football league, the Serie B, and the 112th as a football club.

== Players ==
=== First-team quad ===
As of 31 January 2022

Note: Flags indicate national team as defined under FIFA eligibility rules; some limited exceptions apply. Players may hold more than one non-FIFA nationality.

No.	Pos.	Nation	Player
1	GK	ITA	Marco Festa
2	DF	ITA	Laurens Serpe (on loan from Genoa)
3	DF	ITA	Giuseppe Cuomo
5	DF	SRB	Vladimir Golemić
6	DF	ITA	Davide Mondonico
7	MF	SRB	Miloš Vulić
8	MF	ARG	Nahuel Estévez (on loan from Estudiantes)
9	FW	ITA	Samuele Mulattieri (on loan from Inter)
10	MF	CIV	Ben Lhassine Kone (on loan from Torino)
11	FW	NED	Bobby Adekanye (on loan from Lazio)
14	DF	ITA	Luca Calapai
16	DF	AUT	David Schnegg (on loan from Venezia)
17	MF	ITA	Manuel Marras (on loan from Bari)
19	DF	ITA	Simone Canestrelli (on loan from Empoli)

No.	Pos.	Nation	Player
21	DF	ITA	Manuel Nicoletti
22	GK	ITA	Gianluca Saro
23	MF	ITA	Pasquale Giannotti
24	FW	SLE	Augustus Kargbo
26	DF	LTU	Artemijus Tutyškinas
27	DF	ROU	Ionuț Nedelcearu
28	FW	ITA	Giuseppe Borello
29	DF	ITA	Marco Sala (on loan from Sassuolo)
32	MF	ROU	Vasile Mogoș
44	MF	ITA	Thomas Schirò
70	GK	ITA	Paolo Tornaghi
74	FW	ITA	Gianmarco Cangiano (on loan from Bologna)
86	MF	NGR	Theophilus Awua (on loan from Pro Vercelli)
99	FW	CRO	Mirko Marić (on loan from Monza)

=== Out on loan ===
Note: Flags indicate national team as defined under FIFA eligibility rules; some limited exceptions apply. Players may hold more than one non-FIFA nationality.

No.	Pos.	Nation	Player
—	GK	ITA	Gian Marco Crespi (at Pistoiese until 30 June 2022)
—	GK	ITA	Francesco D'Alterio (at Acireale until 30 June 2022)
—	DF	UKR	Sergio Yakubiv (at Lucchese until 30 June 2022)
—	MF	LBA	Ahmad Benali (at Pisa until 30 June 2022)
—	MF	BRA	Junior Messias (at Milan until 30 June 2022)
—	MF	ITA	Jacopo Petriccione (at Benevento until 30 June 2022)

No.	Pos.	Nation	Player
—	MF	CHI	Luis Rojas (at Bologna until 30 June 2022)
—	MF	ITA	Marco Spina (at Vibonese until 30 June 2022)
—	FW	ITA	Giovanni Bruzzaniti (at Pro Vercelli until 30 June 2022)
—	FW	SMR	Nicola Nanni (at Lucchese until 30 June 2022)
—	FW	ENG	Zak Ruggiero (at Lucchese until 30 June 2022)
—	FW	NGR	Simy (at Salernitana until 30 June 2022)

== Pre-season and friendlies ==
Win Draw Loss

13 July 2021 Friendly	Crotone (Italy)	18–1	(Italy) Real Fondo Gesu	Crotone, Italy
17:30 CEST (UTC+2)				Stadium: Campo Ampollino

23 July 2021 Friendly	Crotone (Italy)	18–0	(Italy) ASD Cotronei 1994	Crotone, Italy
16:00 CEST (UTC+2)				Stadium: Campo Ampollino

28 July 2021 Friendly	Internazionale (Italy)	6–0	(Italy) Crotone	Appiano Gentile
18:00 CEST (UTC+2)	Satriano 10'; Dimarco 22'; Çalhanoğlu 27'; Pinamonti 56'; Sensi 58'; Brozović 65'			Stadium: Centro Sportivo Suning

28 July 2021 Friendly	Alcorcón (Spain)	Cancelled	(Italy) Crotone	Coín, Spain
19:00 CEST (UTC+2)				Stadium: Estadio José Burgos Quintana

1 August 2021 Friendly	Crotone (Italy)	1–0	(Italy) Giana Erminio	Palazzolo sull'Oglio, Italy
17:00 CEST (UTC+2)				Stadium: Stadio Comunale

6 August 2021 Friendly	Crotone (Italy)	1–1 (2–4 p)	(Italy) Vibonese	Crotone, Italy
20:45 CEST (UTC+2)				Stadium: Stadio Ezio Scida

7 August 2021 Friendly	Granada (Spain)	Cancelled	(Italy) Crotone	Marbella, Spain
18:00 CEST (UTC+2)				Stadium: Marbella Football Center

2 September 2021 Friendly	ASD Cotronei 1994 (Italy)	0–7	(Italy) Crotone	Cotronei, Italy
17:00 CEST (UTC+2)				Stadium: Stadio Comunale Salvatore Baffa

== Competitions ==
=== Overall record ===
Competition	First match	Last match	Starting round	Final position	Record							
Competition	First match	Last match	Starting round	Final position	Pld	W	D	L	GF	GA	GD	Win %
Serie B	22 August 2021	6 May 2022	Matchday 1	19th	38	4	14	20	41	61	−20	10.53
Coppa Italia	16 August 2021	14 December 2021	Round of 64	Round of 32	2	0	1	1	2	6	−4	0.00
Total					40	4	15	21	43	67	−24	10.00

Last updated: 6 May 2022
Source: Soccerway

=== Serie A ===
==== League table ====
Pos	Team	Pld	W	D	L	GF	GA	GD	Pts	Promotion, qualification or relegation
16	Cosenza	38	8	11	19	36	59	−23	35	Relegation play-out
17	Vicenza (R)	38	9	7	22	38	59	−21	34 (Note: Vicenza finished ahead of Alessandria on head-to-head points: Vicenza 2–1 Alessandria, Alessandria 0–1 Vicenza.)	Relegation play-out
18	Alessandria (R)	38	8	10	20	37	59	−22	34	Relegation to Serie C
19	Crotone (R)	38	4	14	20	41	61	−20	26	Relegation to Serie C
20	Pordenone (R)	38	3	9	26	29	71	−42	18	Relegation to Serie C

Source: Lega Serie B (in Italian), Soccerway (in English)
Rules for classification: 1) Points; 2) Head-to-head points; 3) Head-to-head goal difference; 4) Goal difference; 5) Goals scored; 6) Draw.
(R) Relegated

==== Results summary ====
Overall								Home						Away					
Pld	W	D	L	GF	GA	GD	Pts	W	D	L	GF	GA	GD	W	D	L	GF	GA	GD
38	4	14	20	41	61	−20	26	4	8	7	23	25	−2	0	6	13	18	36	−18

Last updated: 6 May 2022.
Source: Serie B

==== Results by round ====
Round	1	2	3	4	5	6	7	8	9	10	11	12	13	14	15	16	17	18	19	20	21	22	23	24	25	26	27	28	29	30	31	32	33	34	35	36	37	38
Ground	H	A	H	A	H	A	H	A	H	A	H	A	H	A	H	A	H	H	A	A	H	A	H	A	H	A	H	H	A	H	A	H	A	H	A	H	A	H
Result	D	L	D	D	L	L	D	W	L	L	L	D	L	L	L	L	L	W	D	D	D	L	L	L	D	L	L	D	L	W	L	D	D	L	D	W	D	L
Position	9	14	15	15	16	17	17	17	17	18	18	17	18	18	18	18	18	18	18	18	18	18	18	18	18	19	19	19	19	19	19	19	19	19	19	19	19	19

Updated to match(es) played on 6 May 2022. Source: Serie B
A = Away; H = Home; W = Win; D = Draw; L = Loss

==== Matches ====
The league fixtures were announced on 24 July 2021.

=== Coppa Italia ===
16 August 2021 Round of 64	Crotone	2–2 (a.e.t.) (4–2 p)	Brescia	Crotone
17:45 CEST (UTC+1)	Vulić 26'; Mulattieri 77'	Report	Van de Loi 46'; Bajić 67'	Stadium: Stadio Ezio Scida; Attendance: 1,500; Referee: Luca Massimi
	Penalties
	Molina (penalty scored); Benali (penalty scored); Mogoș (penalty scored); Vulić (penalty scored)		(penalty scored) Bajić; (penalty missed) Moreo; (penalty missed) Ndoj; (penalty scored) Spalek

14 December 2021 Round of 32	Udinese	4–0	Crotone	Udine
18:00 CET (UTC+1)	Pussetto 20', 62'; De Maio 28'; Jajalo (yellow card) 36'; Success 41' (pen.); Zeegelaar (yellow card) 84'	Report		Stadium: Stadio Friuli; Attendance: 1,291; Referee: Matteo Gualtieri
