= 2023–24 FC Crotone season =

FC Crotone
2023–24 season
- Manager: Lamberto Zauli
- Stadium: Stadio Ezio Scida
- Serie C: 9th
- Promotion play-offs: First round
- Coppa Italia: Round of 64
- Coppa Italia Serie C: Round of 16
- Top goalscorer: League: Marco Tumminello (15); All: Marco Tumminello (17)

The 2023–24 season was FC Crotone's 114th season in existence and second consecutive season in the Serie C. They also competed in the Coppa Italia and the Coppa Italia Serie C.

== Players ==
=== First-team squad ===
As of 3 September 2023

Note: Flags indicate national team as defined under FIFA eligibility rules; some limited exceptions apply. Players may hold more than one non-FIFA nationality.

No.	Pos.	Nation	Player
1	GK	ITA	Andrea Dini
2	DF	ITA	Federico Papini
3	DF	FRA	Maxime Giron
5	DF	ITA	Davide Bove
6	DF	FRA	Guillaume Gigliotti
7	FW	ITA	Eugenio D'Ursi
8	MF	BRA	Lucas Felippe
9	FW	ITA	Guido Gómez
10	MF	ITA	Jacopo Petriccione
12	GK	ITA	Alberto Lucano
14	DF	ITA	Carlo Crialese
15	DF	BRA	Vinicius
17	MF	ITA	Giovanni Bruzzaniti
18	DF	ITA	Giuseppe Loiacono
19	MF	ITA	Alessio Tribuzzi
20	MF	CHI	Luis Rojas

No.	Pos.	Nation	Player
21	DF	SUI	Daniel Leo
22	GK	ITA	Francesco D'Alterio
23	MF	CRO	Jurica Jurčec
24	MF	ITA	Pasquale Giannotti
27	MF	ITA	Andrea D'Errico (on loan from Bari)
28	MF	ITA	Mattia Vitale
29	FW	ITA	Raffaele Cantisani
30	FW	ALB	Dardan Vuthaj
36	DF	ITA	Riccardo Spaltro
39	MF	ITA	Thomas Schirò
44	GK	ITA	Antonio Pio Martino
77	FW	ITA	Orazio Pannitteri
93	FW	ITA	Marco Tumminello
99	GK	ITA	Paolo Branduani
—	DF	ITA	Manuel Nicoletti

==== Out on loan ====
Note: Flags indicate national team as defined under FIFA eligibility rules; some limited exceptions apply. Players may hold more than one non-FIFA nationality.

No.	Pos.	Nation	Player
—	GK	ITA	Francesco Gattuso (at Victor San Marino until 30 June 2024)
—	MF	NGR	Theophilus Awua (at Atalanta until 30 June 2024)
—	FW	ITA	Luca Gozzo (at Corticella until 30 June 2024)

No.	Pos.	Nation	Player
—	FW	ITA	Giuseppe Panico (at Carrarese until 30 June 2024, obligation to buy)
—	FW	ITA	Marco Spina (at Gubbio until 30 June 2024)

== Pre-season and friendlies ==
Win Draw Loss Fixtures

30 July 2023 Friendly	Crotone (Italy)	2–2	(Italy) Lecce Primavera
17:30 CEST (UTC+2)

5 August 2023 Memorial Donato Russo SF	Crotone (Italy)	0–0 (3–4 p)	(Italy) Paterno	Paterno
--:-- CEST (UTC+2)	Giannotti (yellow card) 17'	Report		Stadium: Stadio comunale E. Taddeo
Note: Match was played in one period of 40 minutes.

5 August 2023 Memorial Donato Russo 3rd	Crotone (Italy)	3–0	(Italy) Paternicum	Paterno
--:-- CEST (UTC+2)	Pannitteri 11', 30'; Bruzzaniti 17'	Report		Stadium: Stadio comunale E. Taddeo
Note: Match was played in one period of 40 minutes.

10 August 2023 Friendly	Crotone (Italy)	2–0	(Italy) Sambiase
--:-- CEST (UTC+2)	Tumminello 30', 44'; Pannitteri (penalty missed) 43'	Report

== Competitions ==
=== Overall record ===
Competition	First match	Last match	Starting round	Final position	Record							
Competition	First match	Last match	Starting round	Final position	Pld	W	D	L	GF	GA	GD	Win %
Serie C	1 September 2023	28 April 2024	Matchday 1	9th	38	13	13	12	54	47	+7	34.21
Promotion play-offs	7 May 2024		First round	First round	1	0	0	1	0	2	−2	0.00
Coppa Italia	14 August 2023		Round of 64	Round of 64	1	0	0	1	1	3	−2	0.00
Coppa Italia Serie C	8 November 2023	29 November 2023	Second round	Round of 16	2	1	1	0	4	3	+1	50.00
Total					42	14	14	14	59	55	+4	33.33

Source: Flashscore

=== Serie C ===
==== League table ====
Pos	Team	Pld	W	D	L	GF	GA	GD	Pts	Qualification
7	Audace Cerignola	38	12	17	9	54	46	+8	53 (Note: Audace Cerignola are ahead of Giugliano on head-to-head points: Audace Cerignola 6, Giugliano 0.)	Group play-offs 1st round
8	Giugliano	38	15	8	15	44	47	−3	53	Group play-offs 1st round
9	Crotone	38	13	13	12	54	47	+7	52	Group play-offs 1st round
10	Latina	38	14	9	15	44	51	−7	51	Group play-offs 1st round
11	Foggia	38	13	9	16	40	44	−4	48 (Note: Foggia are ahead of Sorrento on overall goal difference: Foggia -4, Sorrento -8.)	

Updated to match(es) played on 27 April 2024. Source: Lega Pro, Soccerway (in English)
Rules for classification: 1) Points; 2) Head-to-head points; 3) Head-to-head goal difference; 4) Goal difference; 5) Goals scored; 6) Lower goals against; 7) Wins; 8) Lower losses; 9) Away wins; 10) Lower home losses.
(Note: Head-to-head record is used only after all the matches between the teams in question have been played)

==== Results summary ====
Overall								Home						Away					
Pld	W	D	L	GF	GA	GD	Pts	W	D	L	GF	GA	GD	W	D	L	GF	GA	GD
38	13	13	12	54	47	+7	52	7	7	5	29	25	+4	6	6	7	25	22	+3

Source: Worldfootball

==== Results by round ====
Round	1	2	3	4	5	6	7	8	9	10	11	12	13	14	15	16	17	18	19	20	21	22	23	24	25	26	27	28	29	30	31	32	33	34	35	36	37	38
Ground	A	H	A	H	H	A	H	A	H	A	H	A	H	A	H	A	H	A	H	H	A	H	A	A	H	A	H	A	H	A	H	A	H	A	H	A	H	A
Result	W	L	L	D	W	L	W	L	W	W	D	D	W	D	W	W	D	W	L	W	W	D	L	D	D	D	D	L	L	W	L	L	D	D	L	D	W	L
Position	6	6	14	13	11	13	9	11	9	6	8	8	7	8	7	5	6	4	6	6	4	4	5	6	6	7	7	7	7	7	7	7	9	9	9	9	8	9

Source: Worldfootball
A = Away; H = Home; W = Win; D = Draw; L = Loss

==== Matches ====
The league fixtures were unveiled on 7 August 2023.

1 September 2023 1	Catania	0–1	Crotone	Catania
19:45 CEST (UTC+2)			Tribuzzi 66'	Stadium: Stadio Angelo Massimino; Referee: Simone Galipò

10 September 2023 2	Crotone	2–3	Turris	Crotone
20:45 CEST (UTC+2)	Vuthaj 46'; Tumminello 81'		Cum 21'; Maniero 31', 47'	Stadium: Stadio Ezio Scida; Referee: Samuele Andreano

17 September 2023 3	Virtus Francavilla	3–1	Crotone	Francavilla Fontana
20:45 CEST (UTC+2)				Stadium: Stadio Giovanni Paolo II

21 September 2023 4	Crotone	1–1	Audace Cerignola	Crotone
20:45 CEST (UTC+2)				Stadium: Stadio Ezio Scida

24 September 2023 5	Crotone	1–0	Sorrento	Crotone
20:45 CEST (UTC+2)				Stadium: Stadio Ezio Scida

1 October 2023 6	Benevento	3–2	Crotone	Benevento
18:30 CEST (UTC+2)				Stadium: Stadio Ciro Vigorito

8 October 2023 7	Crotone	2–1	Picerno	Crotone
16:15 CEST (UTC+2)				Stadium: Stadio Ezio Scida

15 October 2023 8	Taranto	2–1	Crotone	Taranto
16:15 CEST (UTC+2)				Stadium: Stadio Erasmo Iacovone

21 October 2023 9	Crotone	2–1	Foggia	Crotone
18:30 CEST (UTC+2)	Gómez 39'; Vitale 55'		Tonin 8'	Stadium: Stadio Ezio Scida

25 October 2023 10	Giugliano	1–2	Crotone	Giugliano in Campania
18:30 CEST (UTC+2)	De Sena 3'		Tumminello 14', 78'	Stadium: Stadio Alberto De Cristofaro

29 October 2023 11	Crotone	3–3	Messina	Crotone
14:00 CET (UTC+1)	Tumminello 40', 57'; Gómez 45+1'		Giunta 8'; Luciani 50'; Polito 79'	Stadium: Stadio Ezio Scida; Referee: Mattia Caldera

4 November 2023 12	Latina	0–0	Crotone	Latina
18:30 CET (UTC+1)				Stadium: Stadio Domenico Francioni; Attendance: 1,551; Referee: Marco Emmanuele

12 November 2023 13	Crotone	2–1	Monterosi	Crotone
14:00 CET (UTC+1)	Crialese 16'; Bruzzaniti 90+3'		Bittante 33'	Stadium: Stadio Ezio Scida; Referee: Enrico Gemelli

18 November 2023 14	Casertana	1–1	Crotone	Caserta
16:15 CET (UTC+1)	Montalto 17'; Cadili (red card) 67'		Gómez 68' (pen.)	Stadium: Stadio Alberto Pinto; Referee: Emanuele Frascaro

26 November 2023 15	Crotone	2–1	Potenza	Crotone
16:15 CET (UTC+1)	Tumminello 13'; Gómez 54'; Leo (red card) 86'		Volpe 84'	Stadium: Stadio Ezio Scida; Referee: Matteo Centi

3 December 2023 16	Brindisi	0–2	Crotone	Brindisi
20:45 CET (UTC+1)	Galano (penalty missed) 39'		Vuthaj 18'; Spaltro 63'	Stadium: Stadio Franco Fanuzzi; Referee: Edoardo Gianquinto

9 December 2023 17	Crotone	1–1	Juve Stabia	Crotone
18:30 CET (UTC+1)	Tumminello 30'		Candellone 10'	Stadium: Stadio Ezio Scida; Referee: Roberto Lovison

17 December 2023 18	Monopoli	0–3	Crotone	Monopoli
18:30 CEST (UTC+2)				Stadium: Stadio Vito Simone Veneziani

2 March 2024 29	Crotone	2–3	Giugliano	Crotone
				Stadium: Stadio Ezio Scida

6 March 2024 30	Messina	0–1	Crotone	Messina
				Stadium: Stadio San Filippo

10 March 2024 31	Crotone	1–3	Latina	Crotone
				Stadium: Stadio Ezio Scida

17 March 2024 32	Monterosi	1–0	Crotone	Teramo
20:45				Stadium: Stadio Gaetano Bonolis

25 March 2024 33	Crotone	0–0	Casertana	Crotone
				Stadium: Stadio Ezio Scida

30 March 2024 34	Potenza	2–2	Crotone	Potenza
				Stadium: Stadio Alfredo Viviani

7 April 2024 35	Crotone	1–2	Brindisi	Crotone
				Stadium: Stadio Ezio Scida

15 April 2024 36	Juve Stabia	1–1	Crotone	Castellammare di Stabia
				Stadium: Stadio Romeo Menti

21 April 2024 37	Crotone	3–1	Monopoli	Crotone
				Stadium: Stadio Ezio Scida

27 April 2024 38	Avellino	1–0	Crotone	Avellino
18:30 CEST (UTC+2)	Patierno 84' (pen.)			Stadium: Stadio Partenio-Adriano Lombardi

==== Promotion play-offs ====
7 May 2024 First round	Picerno	2–0	Crotone	Picerno
21:00 CEST (UTC+2)	Esposito 22'; D'Agostino 90+7'	Report		Stadium: Stadio Donato Curcio; Referee: Niccolo Turrini

=== Coppa Italia ===
14 August 2023 Round of 64	Cremonese	3–1 (a.e.t.)	Crotone	Cremona
17:45 CEST (UTC+2)	Afena-Gyan 30'; Collocolo (yellow card) 67'; Bianchetti (yellow card) 90+2'; Vázquez 105'; Pickel 117'	Report	Tumminello 7'; Spaltro (yellow card) 10'; Bove (yellow card) 89'	Stadium: Stadio Giovanni Zini; Attendance: 3,372; Referee: Luca Zufferli

=== Coppa Italia Serie C ===
8 November 2023 Second round	Crotone	1–0	Brindisi	Crotone
14:00 CET (UTC+1)	Pannitteri 23'			Stadium: Stadio Ezio Scida; Referee: Fabio Rosario Luongo

29 November 2023 Round of 16	Catania	3–3 (a.e.t.) (3–2 p)	Crotone	Catania
18:30 CET (UTC+1)	De Luca 53'; Dubickas 59'; Di Carmine 87' (pen.)		Tribuzzi 7'; Tumminello 57'; Bruzzaniti 70'	Stadium: Stadio Angelo Massimino; Referee: Gianluca Grasso
