= 2020–21 FC Crotone season =

Crotone
2020–21 season
- Chairman: Gianni Vrenna
- Head coach: Giovanni Stroppa (until 1 March 2021); Serse Cosmi (from 1 March 2021)
- Stadium: Stadio Ezio Scida
- Serie A: 19th (relegated)
- Coppa Italia: Third round
- Top goalscorer: League: Simy (20); All: Simy (20)
Home colours	Away colours	Third colours
- All statistics correct as of 22 May 2021.

The 2020–21 F.C. Crotone season was the 111th season in the club's history. After two seasons in Serie B, Crotone returned to the top division of Italian football. In addition to Serie A, Crotone participated in this season's edition of the Coppa Italia. The season covered the period from 3 August 2020 to 30 June 2021.

== Players ==
=== First-team squad ===
As of 1 February 2021.

Note: Flags indicate national team as defined under FIFA eligibility rules; some limited exceptions apply. Players may hold more than one non-FIFA nationality.

No.	Pos.	Nation	Player
1	GK	ITA	Alex Cordaz (captain)
3	DF	ITA	Giuseppe Cuomo
5	DF	SRB	Vladimir Golemić
6	DF	ARG	Lisandro Magallán (on loan from Ajax)
7	FW	ALG	Adam Ounas (on loan from Napoli)
8	MF	ITA	Luca Cigarini
10	MF	LBA	Ahmad Benali
11	FW	ROU	Denis Drăguș (on loan from Standard Liège)
13	DF	ITA	Sebastiano Luperto (on loan from Napoli)
16	GK	ITA	Marco Festa
17	MF	ITA	Salvatore Molina
20	MF	CHI	Luis Rojas
21	MF	ITA	Niccolò Zanellato
22	GK	ITA	Gian Marco Crespi

No.	Pos.	Nation	Player
23	MF	ITA	Antonio Mazzotta
25	FW	NGR	Simy
26	DF	CIV	Koffi Djidji (on loan from Torino)
30	MF	BRA	Junior Messias
32	DF	POR	Pedro Pereira (on loan from Benfica)
33	DF	ITA	Andrea Rispoli
34	DF	ITA	Luca Marrone
44	MF	ITA	Jacopo Petriccione
54	FW	ITA	Samuel Di Carmine (on loan from Verona)
69	DF	POL	Arkadiusz Reca (on loan from Atalanta)
77	MF	SRB	Miloš Vulić
95	MF	BRA	Eduardo (on loan from Sporting)
97	FW	MTQ	Emmanuel Rivière

=== Other players under contract ===
Note: Flags indicate national team as defined under FIFA eligibility rules; some limited exceptions apply. Players may hold more than one non-FIFA nationality.

No.	Pos.	Nation	Player
—	MF	VEN	Aristóteles Romero

=== Out on loan ===
Note: Flags indicate national team as defined under FIFA eligibility rules; some limited exceptions apply. Players may hold more than one non-FIFA nationality.

No.	Pos.	Nation	Player
—	GK	ITA	Aniello Viscovo (at Fano)
—	MF	FRA	Jean Lambert Evans (at Livorno)
—	MF	ITA	Pasquale Giannotti (at Virtus Francavilla)
—	MF	FRA	Jeremy Petris (at Pro Vercelli)
—	MF	ITA	Francesco Rodio (at Fano)
—	MF	ITA	Giovanni Crociata (at Empoli)

No.	Pos.	Nation	Player
—	FW	ITA	Giuseppe Borello (at Cesena)
—	FW	ITA	Giovanni Bruzzaniti (at Pro Vercelli)
—	FW	SLE	Augustus Kargbo (at Reggiana)
—	FW	SMR	Nicola Nanni (at Cesena)
—	FW	ENG	Zak Ruggiero (at Pro Sesto)

== Pre-season and friendlies ==
On 19 August 2020, Crotone announced a squad of 19 players who would take part in training in Trepidò.

30 August 2020 Friendly	Crotone (Italy)	Cancelled	(Italy) Monopoli	Trepidò, Italy
17:00 CEST (UTC+2)		Report		Stadium: Stadio Ampollino

15 September 2020 Friendly	Crotone (Italy)	6–1	(Italy) Vibonese	Crotone, Italy
17:00 CEST (UTC+2)	Messias 6'; Rivière 8'; Simy 26', 34'; Kargbo 27', 38'	Report	La Ragione 42'	Stadium: Centro Sportivo Antico Borgo; Referee: Antonio Monesi

== Competitions ==
=== Overview ===
Competition	First match	Last match	Starting round	Final position	Record							
Competition	First match	Last match	Starting round	Final position	Pld	W	D	L	GF	GA	GD	Win %
Serie A	20 September 2020	22 May 2021	Matchday 1	19th	38	6	5	27	45	92	−47	15.79
Coppa Italia	28 October 2020		Third round	Third round	1	0	1	0	1	1	+0	0.00
Total					39	6	6	27	46	93	−47	15.38

Last updated: 22 May 2021
Source: Soccerway

=== Serie A ===
==== League table ====
Pos	Team	Pld	W	D	L	GF	GA	GD	Pts	Qualification or relegation
16	Cagliari	38	9	10	19	43	59	−16	37	
17	Torino	38	7	16	15	50	69	−19	37	
18	Benevento (R)	38	7	12	19	40	75	−35	33	Relegation to Serie B
19	Crotone (R)	38	6	5	27	45	92	−47	23	Relegation to Serie B
20	Parma (R)	38	3	11	24	39	83	−44	20	Relegation to Serie B

Source: Serie A, Soccerway
Rules for classification: 1) Points; 2) Head-to-head points; 3) Head-to-head goal difference; 4) Goal difference; 5) Goals scored; 6) Draw. (Note: Head-to-head record is used only after all the matches between the teams in question have been played)
(R) Relegated

==== Results summary ====
Overall								Home						Away					
Pld	W	D	L	GF	GA	GD	Pts	W	D	L	GF	GA	GD	W	D	L	GF	GA	GD
38	6	5	27	45	92	−47	23	5	2	12	23	35	−12	1	3	15	22	57	−35

Last updated: 22 May 2021.
Source: Serie A

==== Results by round ====
Round	1	2	3	4	5	6	7	8	9	10	11	12	13	14	15	16	17	18	19	20	21	22	23	24	25	26	27	28	29	30	31	32	33	34	35	36	37	38
Ground	A	H	A	H	A	H	A	H	A	H	H	A	A	H	A	H	A	H	A	H	A	H	A	H	A	H	A	H	A	A	H	H	A	H	A	H	A	H
Result	L	L	L	D	L	L	D	L	L	L	W	D	L	W	L	L	L	W	L	L	L	L	L	L	L	W	L	L	L	L	L	L	W	L	L	W	D	D
Position	18	19	20	20	20	20	20	20	20	20	20	20	20	19	20	20	20	20	20	20	20	20	20	20	20	20	20	20	20	20	20	20	20	20	20	19	19	19

Updated to match(es) played on 22 May 2021. Source: Serie A
A = Away; H = Home; W = Win; D = Draw; L = Loss

==== Matches ====
The league fixtures were announced on 2 September 2020.

20 September 2020 1	Genoa	4–1	Crotone	Genoa
15:00 CEST (UTC+2)	Destro 6'; Pandev 9', (yellow card) 44'; Zappacosta 34', (yellow card) 37'; Zajc (yellow card) 41'; Ghiglione (yellow card) 70'; Pjaca 75'	Report	Rivière 28'; Molina (yellow card) 29'; Mazzotta (yellow card) 32'	Stadium: Stadio Luigi Ferraris; Referee: Giovanni Ayroldi

27 September 2020 2	Crotone	0–2	Milan	Crotone
18:00 CEST (UTC+2)	Marrone (yellow card) 45+2'	Report	Kessié 45+2' (pen.); Brahim 50'; Gabbia (yellow card) 63'; Hernandez (yellow card) 78'; Leão (yellow card) 90+3'	Stadium: Stadio Ezio Scida; Referee: Luca Pairetto

3 October 2020 3	Sassuolo	4–1	Crotone	Reggio Emilia
15:00 CEST (UTC+2)	Berardi 19'; Chiricheș (yellow card) 24'; Caputo 58' (pen.), 85'; Kyriakopoulos (yellow card) 74'; Locatelli 90+3'	Report	Simy 49' (pen.), (yellow card) 61'; Magallán (yellow card) 63'; Cigarini (yellow card) 65'	Stadium: Mapei Stadium; Referee: Ivano Pezzuto

17 October 2020 4	Crotone	1–1	Juventus	Crotone
20:45 CEST (UTC+2)	Simy 12' (pen.); Cigarini (yellow card) 14'; Reca (yellow card) 67'; Magallán (yellow card) 84'	Report	Bonucci (yellow card) 11'; Morata 21'; Portanova (yellow card) 37'; Kulusevski (yellow card) 45+1'; Chiesa (red card) 60'	Stadium: Stadio Ezio Scida; Referee: Francesco Fourneau

25 October 2020 5	Cagliari	4–2	Crotone	Cagliari
12:30 CET (UTC+1)	Lykogiannis 25', (yellow card) 67'; Marin (yellow card) 32'; Simeone 35'; Sottil 45'; João Pedro 84'	Report	Cigarini (yellow card) 17' (yellow-red card) 48'; Messias 21'; Molina 43'; Magallán (yellow card) 53'; Benali (yellow card) 90+2'	Stadium: Sardegna Arena; Referee: Antonio Di Martino

31 October 2020 6	Crotone	1–2	Atalanta	Crotone
15:00 CET (UTC+1)	Simy 40'; Marrone (yellow card) 49'	Report	Muriel 26', 38'; Hateboer (yellow card) 37'; Toloi (yellow card) 62'; Romero (yellow card) 70'	Stadium: Stadio Ezio Scida; Attendance: 0 Referee: Federico Dionisi

8 November 2020 7	Torino	0–0	Crotone	Turin
15:00 CET (UTC+1)	Verdi (yellow card) 41'; Rodríguez (yellow card) 59'; Belotti (yellow card) 78'	Report	Vulić (yellow card) 5'; Luperto (yellow card) 56' (yellow-red card) 87'; Pereira (yellow card) 81'	Stadium: Stadio Olimpico Grande Torino; Attendance: 0 Referee: Francesco Fourneau

21 November 2020 8	Crotone	0–2	Lazio	Crotone
15:00 CET (UTC+1)	Rispoli (yellow card) 10'; Marrone (yellow card) 25'; Cuomo (yellow card) 56'	Report	Immobile 21'; Farès (yellow card) 26'; Parolo (yellow card) 45+1'; Correa 58'; Lucas (yellow card) 86'; Luis Alberto (yellow card) 90'	Stadium: Stadio Ezio Scida; Attendance: 0 Referee: Juan Luca Sacchi

29 November 2020 9	Bologna	1–0	Crotone	Bologna
15:00 CET (UTC+1)	Hickey (yellow card) 30'; Soriano 45+2'; Palacio (yellow card) 74'	Report	Petriccione (yellow card) 15'; Marrone (yellow card) 19'; Magallán (yellow card) 58'; Luperto (yellow card) 72'	Stadium: Stadio Renato Dall'Ara; Attendance: 0 Referee: Marco Serra

6 December 2020 10	Crotone	0–4	Napoli	Crotone
18:00 CET (UTC+1)	Cuomo (yellow card) 45'; Petriccione (red card) 50'; Pereira (yellow card) 53'; Reca (yellow card) 67'	Report	Koulibaly (yellow card) 6'; Insigne 31'; Lozano 58'; Demme 76'; Lobotka (yellow card) 81'; Politano (yellow card) 84'; Petagna 90+1'	Stadium: Stadio Ezio Scida; Attendance: 0 Referee: Livio Marinelli

12 December 2020 11	Crotone	4–1	Spezia	Crotone
15:00 CET (UTC+1)	Messias 7', 90+6', (yellow card) 33'; Eduardo (yellow card) 34', (goal) 56'; Reca 49'; Magallán (yellow card) 70'	Report	Chabot (yellow card) 3'; Farias 18'; Ferrer (yellow card) 22'; Maggiore (yellow card) 64'	Stadium: Stadio Ezio Scida; Attendance: 0 Referee: Antonio Giua

15 December 2020 12	Udinese	0–0	Crotone	Udine
18:30 CET (UTC+1)	Samir (yellow card) 8'	Report	Messias (yellow card) 28'; Petriccione (yellow card) 39'; Eduardo (yellow card) 77'; Drăguș (yellow card) 87'	Stadium: Stadio Friuli; Attendance: 0 Referee: Antonio Di Martino

19 December 2020 13	Sampdoria	3–1	Crotone	Genoa
18:00 CET (UTC+1)	Damsgaard 26'; Colley (yellow card) 30'; Jankto 36'; Ekdal (yellow card) 49'; Quagliarella 65'	Report	Simy 45+1' (pen.); Messias (yellow card) 45+2'; Marrone (yellow card) 60'	Stadium: Stadio Luigi Ferraris; Attendance: 0 Referee: Gianluca Manganiello

22 December 2020 14	Crotone	2–1	Parma	Crotone
18:30 CET (UTC+1)	Messias 24', 44'; Cuomo (yellow card) 55'; Golemić (yellow card) 79'; Reca (yellow card) 90+1'; Luperto (yellow card) 90+3'	Report	Kurtić (yellow card) 33'; Hernani (yellow card) 45+1'; Kucka (yellow card) 46', (goal) 57'; Inglese (yellow card) 47'; Cyprien (yellow card) 88'; Iacoponi (yellow card) 90+1'	Stadium: Stadio Ezio Scida; Attendance: 0 Referee: Fabio Maresca

3 January 2021 15	Internazionale	6–2	Crotone	Milan
12:30 CET (UTC+1)	Martínez 20', 57', 78'; Marrone 31' (o.g.); Lukaku 64'; Hakimi 87'	Report	Reca (yellow card) 8'; Zanellato 12'; Golemić (yellow card) 22', (goal) 36' (pen.); Luperto (yellow card) 52'	Stadium: San Siro; Attendance: 0 Referee: Gianluca Aureliano

6 January 2021 16	Crotone	1–3	Roma	Crotone
15:00 CET (UTC+1)	Golemić (yellow card) 33', (goal) 71'; Magallán (yellow card) 41'	Report	Mayoral 8', 29'; Peres (yellow card) 22'; Mkhitaryan 35' (pen.); Ibañez (yellow card) 57'; Pellegrini (yellow card) 88'	Stadium: Stadio Ezio Scida; Attendance: 0 Referee: Marco Piccinini

10 January 2021 17	Hellas Verona	2–1	Crotone	Verona
15:00 CET (UTC+1)	Ceccherini (yellow card) 13'; Kalinić 16'; Dimarco 25'; Lovato (yellow card) 42'; Magnani (yellow card) 53'	Report	Djidji (yellow card) 47'; Messias 55'; Reca (yellow card) 56'; Pereira (yellow card) 89'	Stadium: Stadio Marcantonio Bentegodi; Attendance: 0 Referee: Luca Massimi

17 January 2021 18	Crotone	4–1	Benevento	Crotone
15:00 CET (UTC+1)	Glik 5' (o.g.); Simy 29', 54'; Vulić 65'; Messias (yellow card) 87'	Report	Insigne (yellow card) 29'; Ioniță (yellow card) 44'; Sau (red card) 66'; Barba (yellow card) 71'; Falque 82'; Dabo (yellow card) 84'	Stadium: Stadio Ezio Scida; Attendance: 0 Referee: Simone Sozza

23 January 2021 19	Fiorentina	2–1	Crotone	Florence
20:45 CET (UTC+1)	Igor (yellow card) 4'; Bonaventura 20'; Vlahović 32'; Ribéry (yellow card) 41'	Report	Zanellato (yellow card) 30'; Simy 66'; Pereira (yellow card) 83'	Stadium: Stadio Artemio Franchi; Attendance: 0 Referee: Marco Piccinini

31 January 2021 20	Crotone	0–3	Genoa	Crotone
15:00 CET (UTC+1)	Messias (yellow card) 33'; Eduardo (yellow card) 85'; Reca (yellow card) 90'	Report	Destro 24', 50'; Strootman (yellow card) 28'; Czyborra 29'	Stadium: Stadio Ezio Scida; Attendance: 0 Referee: Piero Giacomelli

7 February 2021 21	Milan	4–0	Crotone	Milan
15:00 CET (UTC+1)	Ibrahimović 30', 64'; Saelemaekers (yellow card) 36'; Rebić 69', 70'; Romagnoli (yellow card) 82'; Calabria (yellow card) 86'	Report	Rispoli (yellow card) 74'	Stadium: San Siro; Attendance: 0 Referee: Luca Pairetto

14 February 2021 22	Crotone	1–2	Sassuolo	Crotone
18:00 CET (UTC+1)	Ounas 26'; Vulić (yellow card) 80'	Report	Berardi 14'; Peluso (yellow card) 34'; Caputo 49' (pen.)	Stadium: Stadio Ezio Scida; Attendance: 0 Referee: Ivano Pezzuto

22 February 2021 23	Juventus	3–0	Crotone	Turin
20:45 CET (UTC+1)	Ramsey (yellow card) 21'; Ronaldo 38', 45+1'; Danilo (yellow card) 50'; McKennie 66'; Frabotta (yellow card) 90+1'	Report	Marrone (yellow card) 53'	Stadium: Allianz Stadium; Attendance: 0 Referee: Valerio Marini

28 February 2021 24	Crotone	0–2	Cagliari	Crotone
15:00 CET (UTC+1)	Di Carmine (yellow card) 38'; Magallán (yellow card) 59'	Report	Ceppitelli (yellow card) 4'; Lykogiannis (yellow card) 10' (yellow-red card) 75'; Rugani (yellow card) 46'; Pavoletti 56'; João Pedro 60' (pen.)	Stadium: Stadio Ezio Scida; Attendance: 0 Referee: Michael Fabbri

3 March 2021 25	Atalanta	5–1	Crotone	Bergamo
20:45 CET (UTC+1)	Gosens 12'; Palomino 48'; Muriel 50'; Iličić 58'; Miranchuk 85'	Report	Magallán (yellow card) 7'; Simy 23'; Rivière (yellow card) 27'	Stadium: Gewiss Stadium; Attendance: 0 Referee: Simone Sozza

7 March 2021 26	Crotone	4–2	Torino	Crotone
15:00 CET (UTC+1)	Simy 27' (pen.), 54'; Petriccione (yellow card) 44'; Cordaz (yellow card) 45+1'; Reca 80'; Zanellato (yellow card) 83'; Ounas (yellow card) 90+3', (goal) 90+4'	Report	Mandragora 45'; Rincón (yellow card) 79' (yellow-red card) 90+3'; Sanabria 84'	Stadium: Stadio Ezio Scida; Attendance: 0 Referee: Marco Guida

12 March 2021 27	Lazio	3–2	Crotone	Rome
15:00 CET (UTC+1)	Milinković-Savić 14'; Luis Alberto 39'; Caicedo 84'	Report	Simy 29', 50' (pen.); Djidji (yellow card) 53'; Rispoli (yellow card) 78'; Petriccione (yellow card) 83'	Stadium: Stadio Olimpico; Attendance: 0 Referee: Antonio Rapuano

20 March 2021 28	Crotone	2–3	Bologna	Crotone
15:00 CET (UTC+1)	Cuomo (yellow card) 22'; Messias 32'; Simy 40' (pen.); Petriccione (yellow card) 42'; Djidji (yellow card) 55'; Golemić (yellow card) 88'	Report	Dijks (yellow card) 23'; Soumaoro (yellow card) 39', (goal) 62'; Domínguez (yellow card) 45+1'; Schouten 70'; Palacio (yellow card) 74'; Soriano (yellow card) 78'; Danilo (yellow card) 81'; Olsen 84'; Skorupski (yellow card) 87'	Stadium: Stadio Ezio Scida; Attendance: 0 Referee: Francesco Fourneau

3 April 2021 29	Napoli	4–3	Crotone	Naples
15:00 CEST (UTC+2)	Insigne 19'; Osimhen 22'; Mertens 34'; Di Lorenzo 72'	Report	Rispoli (yellow card) 19'; Simy 25', 48'; Messias 59'; Benali (yellow card) 67'; Pereira (yellow card) 78'; Rojas (yellow card) 87'	Stadium: Stadio San Paolo; Attendance: 0 Referee: Antonio Di Martino

10 April 2021 30	Spezia	3–2	Crotone	La Spezia
15:00 CEST (UTC+2)	Ismajli (yellow card) 33'; Verde 63'; Maggiore 89'; Erlić 90+2'	Report	Reca (yellow card) 26'; Djidji 40'; Simy 78'	Stadium: Stadio Alberto Picco; Attendance: 0 Referee: Simone Sozza

17 April 2021 31	Crotone	1–2	Udinese	Crotone
15:00 CEST (UTC+2)	Simy 68' (pen.)	Report	De Paul 41', 74', (red card) 90+1'; Pereyra (yellow card) 48'; Forestieri (yellow card) 90+4'	Stadium: Stadio Ezio Scida; Attendance: 0 Referee: Luca Massimi

21 April 2021 32	Crotone	0–1	Sampdoria	Crotone
20:45 CEST (UTC+2)	Cigarini (yellow card) 37'	Report	Ferrari (yellow card) 45+2'; Quagliarella 53'	Stadium: Stadio Ezio Scida; Attendance: 0 Referee: Daniele Paterna

24 April 2021 33	Parma	3–4	Crotone	Parma
18:00 CEST (UTC+2)	Hernani 29'; Gervinho 49'; Mihăilă 54'; Brugman (yellow card) 56'; Cornelius (yellow card) 76'; Grassi (yellow card) 78'	Report	Magallán 14'; Simy 42', 69' (pen.); Ounas 45+1'; Messias (yellow card) 70'; Eduardo (yellow card) 90+2'	Stadium: Stadio Ennio Tardini; Attendance: 0 Referee: Antonio Rapuano

1 May 2021 34	Crotone	0–2	Internazionale	Crotone
18:00 CEST (UTC+2)	Rivière (yellow card) 73'	Report	Brozović (yellow card) 38'; Eriksen 69', (yellow card) 90+1'; Hakimi 90+2'	Stadium: Stadio Ezio Scida; Attendance: 0 Referee: Alessandro Prontera

9 May 2021 35	Roma	5–0	Crotone	Rome
18:00 CEST (UTC+2)	Mayoral 47', 90'; Darboe (yellow card) 54'; Cristante (yellow card) 62'; Pellegrini 70', 73'; Mkhitaryan 78'	Report		Stadium: Stadio Olimpico; Attendance: 0 Referee: Simone Sozza

13 May 2021 36	Crotone	2–1	Hellas Verona	Crotone
20:45 CEST (UTC+2)	Ounas 2'; Magallán (yellow card) 21'; Marrone (yellow card) 32'; Pereira (yellow card) 60'; Messias 75'	Report	Tameze (yellow card) 41'; Molina 87' (o.g.)	Stadium: Stadio Ezio Scida; Attendance: 0 Referee: Luca Massimi

16 May 2021 37	Benevento	1–1	Crotone	Benevento
15:00 CEST (UTC+2)	Lapadula 13'; Glik (yellow card) 80'; Gaich (yellow card) 88'	Report	Marrone (yellow card) 15'; Golemić (red card) 24'; Magallán (yellow card) 51'; Simy 90+3'	Stadium: Stadio Ciro Vigorito; Attendance: 0 Referee: Piero Giacomelli

22 May 2021 38	Crotone	0–0	Fiorentina	Crotone
20:45 CEST (UTC+2)	Djidji (yellow card) 44'; Zanellato (yellow card) 83'	Report	Pulgar (yellow card) 25'; Castrovilli (yellow card) 44'	Stadium: Stadio Ezio Scida; Attendance: 0 Referee: Eugenio Abbattista

=== Coppa Italia ===
28 October 2020 Third round	Crotone	1–1 (a.e.t.) (3–4 p)	SPAL	Crotone
CET (UTC+1)	Cigarini 107' (pen.); Eduardo (yellow card) 118'	Report	Okoli (yellow card) 72'; Sa. Esposito (yellow card) 80'; Ranieri (yellow card) 103'; Seck 113'	Stadium: Stadio Ezio Scida; Referee: Matteo Marchetti
	Penalties
	Siligardi (penalty scored); Crociata (penalty missed); Molina (penalty scored); Golemić (penalty scored); Cigarini (penalty missed)		(penalty scored) Sa. Esposito; (penalty scored) Missiroli; (penalty missed) Sala; (penalty scored) Se. Esposito; (penalty scored) Ranieri

== Statistics ==
=== Appearances and goals ===
No.	Pos	Nat	Player	Total		Serie A		Coppa Italia	
No.	Pos	Nat	Player	Apps	Goals	Apps	Goals	Apps	Goals
Goalkeepers
1	GK	(Italy) ITA	Alex Cordaz	36	0	36	0	0	0
16	GK	(Italy) ITA	Marco Festa	2	0	1	0	1	0
22	GK	(Italy) ITA	Gian Marco Crespi	1	0	1	0	0	0
Defenders
3	DF	(Italy) ITA	Giuseppe Cuomo	14	0	8+5	0	1	0
5	DF	(Serbia) SRB	Vladimir Golemić	31	2	26+4	2	1	0
6	DF	(Argentina) ARG	Lisandro Magallán	28	1	25+3	1	0	0
13	DF	(Italy) ITA	Sebastiano Luperto	23	0	22+1	0	0	0
26	DF	(Ivory Coast) CIV	Koffi Djidji	20	1	16+4	1	0	0
32	DF	(Portugal) POR	Pedro Pereira	36	0	29+6	0	0+1	0
33	DF	(Italy) ITA	Andrea Rispoli	20	0	5+14	0	1	0
34	DF	(Italy) ITA	Luca Marrone	22	0	18+3	0	1	0
69	DF	(Poland) POL	Arkadiusz Reca	31	2	28+2	2	1	0
Midfielders
8	MF	(Italy) ITA	Luca Cigarini	15	1	13+1	0	0+1	1
10	MF	(Libya) LBA	Ahmad Benali	18	0	15+3	0	0	0
17	MF	(Italy) ITA	Salvatore Molina	30	1	28+1	1	0+1	0
20	MF	(Chile) CHI	Luis Rojas	7	0	0+7	0	0	0
21	MF	(Italy) ITA	Niccolò Zanellato	27	1	18+9	1	0	0
23	MF	(Italy) ITA	Antonio Mazzotta	2	0	1+1	0	0	0
30	MF	(Brazil) BRA	Junior Messias	37	9	36	9	0+1	0
44	MF	(Italy) ITA	Jacopo Petriccione	21	0	11+9	0	1	0
77	MF	(Serbia) SRB	Miloš Vulić	26	1	13+12	1	1	0
95	MF	(Brazil) BRA	Eduardo	19	1	8+10	1	1	0
Forwards
7	FW	(Algeria) ALG	Adam Ounas	15	4	15	4	0	0
11	FW	(Romania) ROU	Denis Drăguș	9	0	1+8	0	0	0
25	FW	(Nigeria) NGR	Simy	39	20	31+7	20	1	0
54	FW	(Italy) ITA	Samuel Di Carmine	11	0	5+6	0	0	0
97	FW	(Martinique) MTQ	Emmanuel Rivière	21	1	7+14	1	0	0
Players transferred out during the season
14	MF	(Italy) ITA	Giovanni Crociata	3	0	0+2	0	0+1	0
26	MF	(Italy) ITA	Luca Siligardi	5	0	0+4	0	1	0

Last updated: 22 May 2021
Source: Competitions

=== Goalscorers ===
As of 22 May 2021

Rank	No.	Pos.	Nat.	Name	Serie A	Coppa Italia	Total
1	25	FW	(Nigeria)	Simy	20	0	20
2	30	MF	(Brazil)	Junior Messias	9	0	9
3	7	FW	(Algeria)	Adam Ounas	4	0	4
4	5	DF	(Serbia)	Vladimir Golemić	2	0	2
4	69	DF	(Poland)	Arkadiusz Reca	2	0	2
6	8	MF	(Italy)	Luca Cigarini	0	1	1
6	17	MF	(Italy)	Salvatore Molina	1	0	1
6	21	MF	(Italy)	Niccolò Zanellato	1	0	1
6	77	MF	(Serbia)	Miloš Vulić	1	0	1
6	95	MF	(Brazil)	Eduardo	1	0	1
6	97	FW	(Martinique)	Emmanuel Rivière	1	0	1
Own goals					1	0	1
Totals					45	1	46
