= Eduardo Henrique =

Brazilian footballer (born 1995)

Eduardo
Personal information
- Full name: Eduardo Henrique da Silva
- Date of birth: 17 May 1995 (age 31)
- Place of birth: Limeira, Brazil
- Height: 1.84 m (6 ft 0 in)
- Position: Defensive midfielder

Youth career
- 2011–2013: Guarani
- 2012–2013: → São Paulo (loan)
- 2013–2014: Coimbra
- 2013–2014: → Atlético Mineiro (loan)

Senior career*
Years	Team	Apps	(Gls)
2012–2013	Guarani	1	(0)
2013–2016	Coimbra	0	(0)
2013–2016	→ Atlético Mineiro (loan)	32	(1)
2016–2019	Internacional	9	(0)
2017	→ Atlético Paranaense (loan)	15	(2)
2018–2019	→ Belenenses SAD (loan)	24	(1)
2019–2023	Sporting CP	15	(0)
2020–2021	→ Crotone (loan)	18	(1)
2021–2022	→ Al Raed (loan)	29	(0)
2024	Qingdao West Coast	13	(1)
2024–2026	Al-Ula	31	(7)
2025–2026	→ Al-Faisaly (loan)	27	(4)

International career
2015	Brazil U20		(0)
- * Club domestic league appearances and goals as of 06:27, 7 August 2024 (UTC)

Eduardo Henrique da Silva (born 17 May 1995), known as Eduardo Henrique or simply Eduardo, is a Brazilian professional footballer who plays as a defensive midfielder.

== Club career ==
=== Guarani ===
Born in Limeira, São Paulo, Eduardo graduated from Guarani's youth setup. He made his professional debut on 21 January 2012, coming on as a late substitute in a 2–1 home win against Oeste for the Campeonato Paulista championship.

=== São Paulo ===
In September 2012 Eduardo moved to São Paulo, on loan until January. After his loan expired, he refused to return to his parent club, and his deal was eventually cancelled in March 2013.

=== Atlético Mineiro ===
Late in the year, Eduardo moved to Atlético Mineiro. He made his Série A debut on 18 May 2014, playing the last 24 minutes of a 2–1 away win against Santos.

=== Internacional ===
In August 2018, Eduardo joined Internacional and in April 2017, he was loaned out to Atlético Paranaense for the rest of the year.

=== Belenenses SAD ===
On 28 June 2018, Eduardo joined Portuguese Primeira Liga club Belenenses SAD on loan for the 2018–19 season.

=== Sporting CP and loans ===
On 2 July 2019, Eduardo signed a five-year contract with fellow Primeira Liga club Sporting CP, for a reported fee of €3 million.

On 10 September 2020, Eduardo joined Crotone on a season-long loan.

On 6 August 2021, Sporting CP sent Eduardo on a season-long loan to Saudi Pro League club Al Raed.

On 23 December 2023, Eduardo terminated his contract with Sporting CP.

=== Qingdao West Coast ===
On 22 January 2024, Eduardo joined newly-promoted Chinese Super League club Qingdao West Coast.

=== Al-Ula and loans ===
On 7 August 2024, Henrique joined Saudi Second Division League club Al-Ula.

On 10 September 2025, Henrique joined Al-Faisaly on loan.

== Career statistics ==
As of match played 27 June 2022

Appearances and goals by club, season and competition
Club	Season	League			State league		National cup (Note: Includes Copa do Brasil, Taça de Portugal, Coppa Italia, King Cup)		Continental		Other		Total	
Club	Season	Division	Apps	Goals	Apps	Goals	Apps	Goals	Apps	Goals	Apps	Goals	Apps	Goals
Guarani	2012	Série B	0	0	1 (Note: Appearance in Campeonato Paulista)	0	1	0	—		—		2	0
Coimbra	2013	—			0	0	—		—		—		0	0
Atlético Mineiro (loan)	2014	Série A	12	0	5 (Note: Appearance(s) in Campeonato Mineiro)	0	1	0	0	0	0	0	18	0
Atlético Mineiro (loan)	2015	Série A	2	0	1	0	1	0	1 (Note: Appearance(s) in Copa Libertadores)	0	—		5	0
Atlético Mineiro (loan)	2016	Série A	6	0	6	1	0	0	5	0	2 (Note: Appearance(s) in Primeira Liga)	1	19	2
Atlético Mineiro (loan)	Total		20	0	12	1	2	0	6	0	2	1	42	2
Internacional	2016	Série A	7	0	0	0	4	0	—		0	0	11	0
Internacional	2017	Série B	0	0	2	0	0	0	—		1	0	3	0
Internacional	Total		7	0	2	0	4	0	—		1	0	14	0
Atlético Paranaense (loan)	2017	Série A	15	2	0	0	2	0	0	0	—		17	2
Belenenses SAD (loan)	2018–19	Primeira Liga	24	1	—		2	1	—		3 (Note: Appearance(s) in Taça da Liga)	0	29	2
Sporting CP	2019–20	Primeira Liga	15	0	—		1	0	5 (Note: Appearances in UEFA Europa League)	0	1	0	22	0
Sporting CP	2022–23	Primeira Liga	0	0	—		0	0	0	0	0	0	0	0
Sporting CP	2023–24	Primeira Liga	0	0	—		0	0	0	0	0	0	0	0
Sporting CP	Total		15	0	—		1	0	5	0	1	0	22	0
Crotone (loan)	2020–21	Serie A	18	1	—		1	0	—		—		19	1
Al Raed (loan)	2021–22	Saudi Pro League	29	0	—		1	0	—		—		30	0
Career total			128	4	15	1	14	1	11	0	7	1	175	7

== International career ==
On 27 November 2014 Eduardo was called up to Brazil under-20's for the 2015 South American Youth Football Championship, held in Uruguay.

== Honours ==
Atlético Mineiro

- Recopa Sudamericana: 2014
- Copa do Brasil: 2014
- Campeonato Mineiro: 2015
