= Pedro Pereira (footballer, born 1998) =

Portuguese footballer (born 1998)

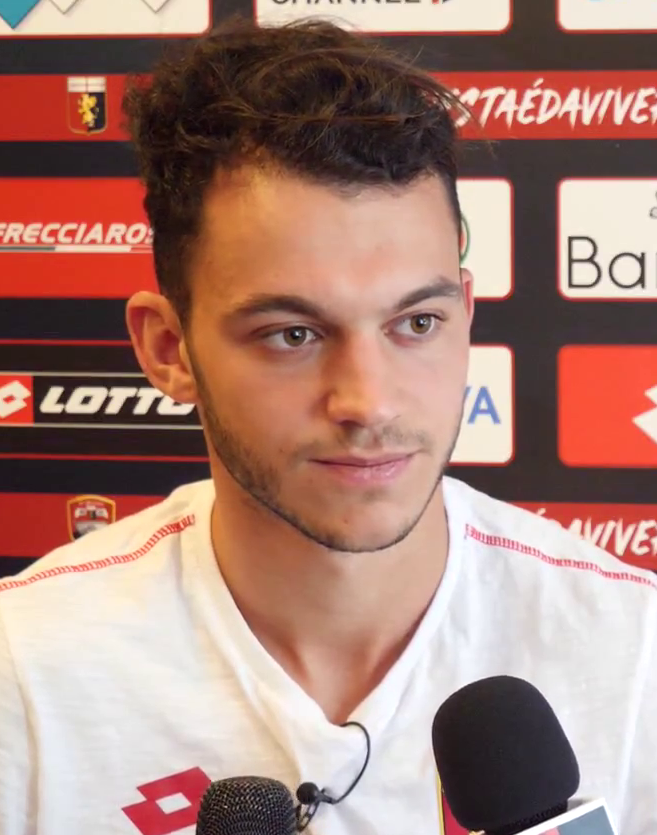
- Pereira with Genoa in 2018

Personal information
- Full name: Pedro Miguel Almeida Lopes Pereira
- Date of birth: 22 January 1998 (age 28)
- Place of birth: Vendas Novas, Portugal
- Height: 1.82 m (6 ft 0 in)
- Position: Right-back

Team information
- Current team: Gençlerbirliği
- Number: 13

Youth career
- 2006–2007: Estrela FC
- 2007–2008: GDR Afeiteira
- 2008–2015: Benfica
- 2015–2016: Sampdoria

Senior career*
| Years | Team | Apps | (Gls) |
| 2015–2017 | Sampdoria | 21 | (0) |
| 2017–2021 | Benfica B | 1 | (0) |
| 2017–2022 | Benfica | 1 | (0) |
| 2018–2019 | → Genoa (loan) | 32 | (0) |
| 2019–2020 | → Bristol City (loan) | 21 | (2) |
| 2020–2021 | → Crotone (loan) | 35 | (0) |
| 2021–2022 | → Monza (loan) | 34 | (0) |
| 2022–2025 | Monza | 58 | (1) |
| 2022–2023 | → Alanyaspor (loan) | 26 | (0) |
| 2025– | Gençlerbirliği | 30 | (0) |

International career
| 2013 | Portugal U15 | 2 | (0) |
| 2013–2014 | Portugal U16 | 10 | (0) |
| 2014–2015 | Portugal U17 | 17 | (0) |
| 2015 | Portugal U18 | 3 | (0) |
| 2016–2017 | Portugal U19 | 4 | (0) |
| 2018 | Portugal U20 | 2 | (0) |
| 2019–2021 | Portugal U21 | 4 | (0) |
- * Club domestic league appearances and goals as of 10 June 2026

Pedro Miguel Almeida Lopes Pereira (born 22 January 1998) is a Portuguese professional footballer who plays as a right-back for Turkish club Gençlerbirliği.

== Early life ==
Born in Vendas Novas, Évora District, Pereira grew up supporting Sporting CP but switched allegiances to city rivals Benfica upon joining them as a youth.

== Club career ==
=== Sampdoria ===
Pereira transferred to Italian club Sampdoria in 2015, and made his professional Serie A debut on 14 September that year, as a 22nd-minute substitute for Mattia Cassani in a 2–0 home win over Bologna. On 4 October, he registered his first assist in a 1–1 draw with Inter Milan, also at the Stadio Luigi Ferraris, for Luis Muriel to open the scoring.

=== Benfica ===
==== First team ====
On 30 January 2017, Pereira returned to Benfica and signed a contract until 2022. He made his only first-team appearance for the Encarnados on 20 May in the last game for the already crowned champions, playing the full 90 minutes of a 2–2 draw at Boavista FC, and thereby being recorded as a league winner.

==== Reserve team ====
Pereira's only other involvement with the club was on 28 October, in the reserve team's 4–0 loss at Gil Vicente FC, on the request of club president Luís Filipe Vieira to motivate the player who was out of first-team coach Rui Vitória's plans.

==== Genoa (loan) ====
In January 2018, Pereira was loaned back to Serie A, to Sampdoria's city rivals Genoa on an 18-month deal. The Rossoblu were given the option to purchase him for €4.5 million.

==== Bristol City (loan) ====
Pereira was loaned again in August 2019, to Bristol City of England's EFL Championship for a year with the option to buy for €6 million. He scored his first senior goal on 27 October, an 86th-minute equaliser in the Robins' 2–2 home draw with Wigan Athletic, heading in a corner kick from Niclas Eliasson at the near post.

==== Crotone (loan) ====
On 21 September 2020, Pereira was loaned back to Serie A, this time to Crotone.

=== Monza ===
On 23 July 2021, Pereira joined Serie B side Monza on a one-year loan, with a conditional obligation to buy for €2.5 million. By 31 December 2021, Benfica had sold the player's rights to Monza. Pereira began the season by assisting Carlos Augusto's goal against Cittadella in the first round of the 2021–22 Coppa Italia on 14 August 2021; the match ended in a 2–1 defeat. On 29 August, Pereira assisted Christian Gytkjær in a 1–0 home win against Cremonese.

==== Alanyaspor (loan) ====
On 18 August 2022, Monza loaned out Pereira to Turkish Süper Lig club Alanyaspor for one year.

=== Gençlerbirliği ===
On 24 July 2025, Pereira returned to Turkey and signed a two-year contract with Gençlerbirliği.

== Career statistics ==
As of match played 24 May 2025

Appearances and goals by club, season and competition
| Club | Season | League | | | National cup (Note: Includes Coppa Italia, Taça de Portugal, FA Cup) | | League cup (Note: Includes EFL Cup) | | Total | |
| Club | Season | Division | Apps | Goals | Apps | Goals | Apps | Goals | Apps | Goals |
|---|---|---|---|---|---|---|---|---|---|---|
| Sampdoria | 2015–16 | Serie A | 9 | 0 | 0 | 0 | — | | 9 | 0 |
| Sampdoria | 2016–17 | Serie A | 12 | 0 | 0 | 0 | — | | 12 | 0 |
| Sampdoria | Total | | 21 | 0 | 0 | 0 | 0 | 0 | 21 | 0 |
| Benfica | 2016–17 | Primeira Liga | 1 | 0 | — | | — | | 1 | 0 |
| Benfica | 2017–18 | Primeira Liga | 0 | 0 | — | | — | | 0 | 0 |
| Benfica | 2018–19 | Primeira Liga | — | | — | | — | | 0 | 0 |
| Benfica | 2019–20 | Primeira Liga | — | | — | | — | | 0 | 0 |
| Benfica | Total | | 1 | 0 | 0 | 0 | 0 | 0 | 1 | 0 |
| Benfica B | 2017–18 | LigaPro | 1 | 0 | — | | — | | 1 | 0 |
| Genoa (loan) | 2017–18 | Serie A | 6 | 0 | — | | — | | 6 | 0 |
| Genoa (loan) | 2018–19 | Serie A | 26 | 0 | 1 | 0 | — | | 27 | 0 |
| Genoa (loan) | Total | | 32 | 0 | 1 | 0 | 0 | 0 | 33 | 0 |
| Bristol City (loan) | 2019–20 | Championship | 21 | 2 | 1 | 0 | 0 | 0 | 22 | 2 |
| Crotone (loan) | 2020–21 | Serie A | 35 | 0 | 1 | 0 | — | | 36 | 0 |
| Monza (loan) | 2021–22 | Serie B | 33 | 0 | 1 | 0 | 1 | 0 | 35 | 0 |
| Monza | 2023–24 | Serie A | 23 | 0 | 0 | 0 | — | | 23 | 0 |
| Monza | 2024–25 | Serie A | 35 | 1 | 2 | 0 | — | | 37 | 1 |
| Monza | Total | | 91 | 1 | 3 | 0 | 1 | 0 | 95 | 1 |
| Alanyaspor (loan) | 2022–23 | Süper Lig | 26 | 0 | 2 | 0 | — | | 28 | 0 |
| Career total | | | 228 | 3 | 8 | 0 | 1 | 0 | 237 | 3 |

== Honours ==
Benfica

- Primeira Liga: 2016–17

Portugal U21

- UEFA European Under-21 Championship runner-up: 2021
