= 2019–20 Bristol City F.C. season =

Bristol City
2019–20 season
- Owner: Steve Lansdown
- Chairman: Jon Lansdown
- Head Coach: Lee Johnson (until 4 July 2020); Dean Holden (Caretaker)(From 4 July 2020)
- Stadium: Ashton Gate
- Championship: 12th
- FA Cup: Third round
- EFL Cup: First round
- Top goalscorer: League: Famara Diédhiou (11); All: Famara Diédhiou (13)
- Highest home attendance: 23,557
- Lowest home attendance: 19,742
| Home colours | Away colours |

The 2019–20 season was Bristol City's 122nd season as a professional football club and their fifth consecutive season in the Championship. Along with competing in the Championship, the club also participated in the FA Cup and the EFL Cup. The season covered the period from 1 July 2019 to 22 July 2020.

== Statistics ==
As of 22 July 2020

| No. | Pos | Nat | Player | Total | | Championship | | FA Cup | | League Cup | |
| No. | Pos | Nat | Player | Apps | Goals | Apps | Goals | Apps | Goals | Apps | Goals |
|---|---|---|---|---|---|---|---|---|---|---|---|
| 1 | GK | (England) ENG | Dan Bentley | 44 | 0 | 42+1 | 0 | 0+0 | 0 | 1+0 | 0 |
| 2 | DF | (England) ENG | Jack Hunt | 37 | 1 | 30+6 | 0 | 0+0 | 0 | 1+0 | 1 |
| 3 | DF | (England) ENG | Jay DaSilva | 25 | 0 | 22+2 | 0 | 1+0 | 0 | 0+0 | 0 |
| 4 | MF | (Hungary) HUN | Ádám Nagy | 25 | 1 | 16+7 | 1 | 1+0 | 0 | 0+1 | 0 |
| 6 | DF | (England) ENG | Nathan Baker | 36 | 1 | 33+1 | 1 | 0+1 | 0 | 0+1 | 0 |
| 7 | MF | (England) ENG | Korey Smith | 22 | 0 | 19+3 | 0 | 0+0 | 0 | 0+0 | 0 |
| 9 | FW | (Senegal) SEN | Famara Diedhiou | 44 | 14 | 30+12 | 12 | 1+0 | 1 | 1+0 | 1 |
| 11 | MF | (Republic of Ireland) IRL | Callum O'Dowda | 32 | 1 | 16+14 | 1 | 0+1 | 0 | 0+1 | 0 |
| 14 | FW | (Austria) AUT | Andreas Weimann | 46 | 9 | 42+3 | 9 | 0+1 | 0 | 0+0 | 0 |
| 15 | MF | (Wales) WAL | Marley Watkins | 10 | 1 | 5+4 | 1 | 1+0 | 0 | 0+0 | 0 |
| 17 | MF | (England) ENG | Sammie Szmodics | 4 | 0 | 1+2 | 0 | 0+0 | 0 | 1+0 | 0 |
| 18 | FW | (England) ENG | Antoine Semenyo | 10 | 0 | 3+6 | 0 | 0+0 | 0 | 1+0 | 0 |
| 19 | MF | (Sweden) SWE | Niclas Eliasson | 38 | 3 | 18+18 | 3 | 1+0 | 0 | 1+0 | 0 |
| 20 | MF | (England) ENG | Jamie Paterson | 21 | 6 | 15+6 | 6 | 0+0 | 0 | 0+0 | 0 |
| 21 | FW | (Bermuda) BER | Nahki Wells | 17 | 5 | 13+4 | 5 | 0+0 | 0 | 0+0 | 0 |
| 22 | DF | (Czech Republic) CZE | Tomáš Kalas | 24 | 0 | 23+0 | 0 | 1+0 | 0 | 0+0 | 0 |
| 23 | DF | (England) ENG | Taylor Moore | 23 | 1 | 16+5 | 1 | 1+0 | 0 | 1+0 | 0 |
| 25 | MF | (England) ENG | Tommy Rowe | 30 | 2 | 24+5 | 2 | 0+0 | 0 | 1+0 | 0 |
| 26 | DF | (England) ENG | Zak Vyner | 8 | 0 | 4+4 | 0 | 0+0 | 0 | 0+0 | 0 |
| 29 | DF | (Wales) WAL | Ashley Williams | 32 | 2 | 32+0 | 2 | 0+0 | 0 | 0+0 | 0 |
| 31 | DF | (Croatia) CRO | Filip Benković | 10 | 2 | 6+4 | 2 | 0+0 | 0 | 0+0 | 0 |
| 32 | DF | (Portugal) POR | Pedro Pereira | 22 | 2 | 14+7 | 2 | 1+0 | 0 | 0+0 | 0 |
| 33 | GK | (Finland) FIN | Niki Mäenpää | 5 | 0 | 4+0 | 0 | 1+0 | 0 | 0+0 | 0 |
| 40 | FW | (Democratic Republic of the Congo) COD | Benik Afobe | 12 | 3 | 8+4 | 3 | 0+0 | 0 | 0+0 | 0 |
| 42 | MF | (France) FRA | Han-Noah Massengo | 27 | 0 | 23+2 | 0 | 1+0 | 0 | 1+0 | 0 |
| 45 | MF | (England) ENG | Kasey Palmer | 26 | 1 | 11+14 | 1 | 1+0 | 0 | 0+0 | 0 |
Players out on loan:
| 10 | FW | (England) ENG | Matty Taylor | 1 | 0 | 0+1 | 0 | 0+0 | 0 | 0+0 | 0 |
Players who left during the season:
| 5 | DF | (Australia) AUS | Bailey Wright | 4 | 0 | 3+0 | 0 | 0+0 | 0 | 1+0 | 0 |
| 8 | MF | (England) ENG | Josh Brownhill | 28 | 5 | 28+0 | 5 | 0+0 | 0 | 0+0 | 0 |
| 8 | MF | (Norway) NOR | Markus Henriksen | 4 | 0 | 4+0 | 0 | 0+0 | 0 | 0+0 | 0 |
| 21 | MF | (England) ENG | Marlon Pack | 1 | 0 | 1+0 | 0 | 0+0 | 0 | 0+0 | 0 |
| 31 | FW | (Spain) ESP | Rodri | 6 | 0 | 1+5 | 0 | 0+0 | 0 | 0+0 | 0 |

=== Goals record ===
As of 22 July 2020

| Rank | No. | Nat. | Po. | Name | Championship | FA Cup | League Cup | Total |
|---|---|---|---|---|---|---|---|---|
| 1 | 9 | (Senegal) | CF | Famara Diedhiou | 12 | 1 | 1 | 14 |
| 2 | 14 | (Austria) | SS | Andreas Weimann | 9 | 0 | 0 | 9 |
| 3 | 20 | (England) | AM | Jamie Paterson | 6 | 0 | 0 | 6 |
| 4 | ~~8~~ | (England) | CM | Josh Brownhill | 5 | 0 | 0 | 5 |
| 4 | 21 | (Bermuda) | CF | Nahki Wells | 5 | 0 | 0 | 5 |
| 6 | 40 | (Democratic Republic of the Congo) | CF | Benik Afobe | 3 | 0 | 0 | 3 |
| 8 | 19 | (Sweden) | LM | Niclas Eliasson | 2 | 0 | 0 | 2 |
| 8 | 25 | (England) | LM | Tommy Rowe | 2 | 0 | 0 | 2 |
| 8 | 29 | (Wales) | CB | Ashley Williams | 2 | 0 | 0 | 2 |
| 8 | 31 | (Croatia) | CB | Filip Benković | 2 | 0 | 0 | 2 |
| 8 | 32 | (Portugal) | RB | Pedro Pereira | 2 | 0 | 0 | 2 |
| 13 | 2 | (England) | RB | Jack Hunt | 0 | 0 | 1 | 1 |
| 13 | 4 | (Hungary) | DM | Ádám Nagy | 1 | 0 | 0 | 1 |
| 13 | 6 | (England) | CB | Nathan Baker | 1 | 0 | 0 | 1 |
| 13 | 11 | (Republic of Ireland) | LM | Callum O'Dowda | 1 | 0 | 0 | 1 |
| 13 | 12 | (England) | CM | Liam Walsh | 0 | 0 | 1 | 1 |
| 13 | 15 | (Wales) | RW | Marley Watkins | 1 | 0 | 0 | 1 |
| 13 | 23 | (England) | CB | Taylor Moore | 1 | 0 | 0 | 1 |
| 13 | 45 | (England) | CM | Kasey Palmer | 1 | 0 | 0 | 1 |
| Own Goals | | | | | 3 | 0 | 0 | 3 |
| Total | | | | | 57 | 1 | 3 | 61 |

=== Disciplinary record ===
As of 22 July 2020

| Rank | No. | Nat. | Po. | Name | Championship | | | FA Cup | | | League Cup | | | Total | | |
| Rank | No. | Nat. | Po. | Name | Booked | (yellow card) (yellow-red card) | Sent off (straight red) | Booked | (yellow card) (yellow-red card) | Sent off (straight red) | Booked | (yellow card) (yellow-red card) | Sent off (straight red) | Booked | (yellow card) (yellow-red card) | Sent off (straight red) |
|---|---|---|---|---|---|---|---|---|---|---|---|---|---|---|---|---|
| 1 | 14 | (Austria) | SS | Andreas Weimann | 8 | 0 | 0 | 0 | 0 | 0 | 0 | 0 | 0 | 8 | 0 | 0 |
| 2 | 2 | (England) | RB | Jack Hunt | 6 | 0 | 0 | 0 | 0 | 0 | 0 | 0 | 0 | 6 | 0 | 0 |
| 3 | 45 | (England) | CM | Kasey Palmer | 5 | 0 | 0 | 0 | 0 | 0 | 0 | 0 | 0 | 5 | 0 | 0 |
| 4 | 9 | (Senegal) | CF | Famara Diedhiou | 3 | 0 | 1 | 0 | 0 | 0 | 0 | 0 | 0 | 4 | 0 | 1 |
| 4 | 25 | (England) | LM | Tommy Rowe | 5 | 0 | 0 | 0 | 0 | 0 | 0 | 0 | 0 | 5 | 0 | 0 |
| 6 | 7 | (England) | CM | Korey Smith | 4 | 0 | 0 | 0 | 0 | 0 | 0 | 0 | 0 | 4 | 0 | 0 |
| 6 | ~~8~~ | (England) | CM | Josh Brownhill | 4 | 0 | 0 | 0 | 0 | 0 | 0 | 0 | 0 | 4 | 0 | 0 |
| 6 | 29 | (Wales) | CB | Ashley Williams | 2 | 0 | 2 | 0 | 0 | 0 | 0 | 0 | 0 | 2 | 0 | 2 |
| 9 | 6 | (England) | CB | Nathan Baker | 3 | 0 | 0 | 0 | 0 | 0 | 0 | 0 | 0 | 3 | 0 | 0 |
| 9 | 31 | (Croatia) | CB | Filip Benković | 3 | 0 | 0 | 0 | 0 | 0 | 0 | 0 | 0 | 3 | 0 | 0 |
| 9 | 32 | (Portugal) | RB | Pedro Pereira | 3 | 0 | 0 | 0 | 0 | 0 | 0 | 0 | 0 | 3 | 0 | 0 |
| 12 | 11 | (Republic of Ireland) | LW | Callum O'Dowda | 2 | 0 | 0 | 0 | 0 | 0 | 0 | 0 | 0 | 2 | 0 | 0 |
| 12 | 20 | (England) | AM | Jamie Paterson | 2 | 0 | 0 | 0 | 0 | 0 | 0 | 0 | 0 | 2 | 0 | 0 |
| 12 | 22 | (Czech Republic) | CB | Tomáš Kalas | 2 | 0 | 0 | 0 | 0 | 0 | 0 | 0 | 0 | 2 | 0 | 0 |
| 12 | 23 | (England) | CB | Taylor Moore | 1 | 0 | 0 | 1 | 0 | 0 | 0 | 0 | 0 | 2 | 0 | 0 |
| 16 | 1 | (England) | GK | Dan Bentley | 1 | 0 | 0 | 0 | 0 | 0 | 0 | 0 | 0 | 1 | 0 | 0 |
| 16 | 3 | (England) | LB | Jay Dasilva | 1 | 0 | 0 | 0 | 0 | 0 | 0 | 0 | 0 | 1 | 0 | 0 |
| 16 | 4 | (Hungary) | DM | Ádám Nagy | 1 | 0 | 0 | 0 | 0 | 0 | 0 | 0 | 0 | 1 | 0 | 0 |
| 16 | 10 | (England) | CF | Matty Taylor | 1 | 0 | 0 | 0 | 0 | 0 | 0 | 0 | 0 | 1 | 0 | 0 |
| 16 | 19 | (Sweden) | LM | Niclas Eliasson | 1 | 0 | 0 | 0 | 0 | 0 | 0 | 0 | 0 | 1 | 0 | 0 |
| 16 | ~~21~~ | (England) | CM | Marlon Pack | 1 | 0 | 0 | 0 | 0 | 0 | 0 | 0 | 0 | 1 | 0 | 0 |
| 16 | 26 | (England) | RB | Zak Vyner | 1 | 0 | 0 | 0 | 0 | 0 | 0 | 0 | 0 | 1 | 0 | 0 |
| 16 | ~~31~~ | (Spain) | CF | Rodri | 1 | 0 | 0 | 0 | 0 | 0 | 0 | 0 | 0 | 1 | 0 | 0 |
| 16 | 42 | (France) | CM | Han-Noah Massengo | 1 | 0 | 0 | 0 | 0 | 0 | 0 | 0 | 0 | 1 | 0 | 0 |
| Total | | | | | !0 | 3 | 1 | 0 | 0 | 0 | 0 | 0 | 57 | 0 | 3 | |

== Transfers ==
=== Transfers in ===
| Date | Position | Nationality | Name | From | Fee | Ref. |
|---|---|---|---|---|---|---|
| 1 July 2019 | GK | (England) | Dan Bentley | (England) Brentford | Undisclosed | |
| 1 July 2019 | FW | (England) | Louis Britton | (England) Mangotsfield United | Undisclosed | |
| 1 July 2019 | CB | (England) | Robbie Cundy | (England) Bath City | Undisclosed | |
| 1 July 2019 | LB | (England) | Jay Dasilva | (England) Chelsea | Undisclosed | |
| 1 July 2019 | GK | (Republic of Ireland) | Rene Gilmartin | (England) Colchester United | Free transfer | |
| 1 July 2019 | CB | (Czech Republic) | Tomáš Kalas | (England) Chelsea | Undisclosed | |
| 1 July 2019 | LM | (England) | Tommy Rowe | (England) Doncaster Rovers | Free transfer | |
| 1 July 2019 | AM | (England) | Sammie Szmodics | (England) Colchester United | Undisclosed | |
| 1 August 2019 | AM | (England) | Kasey Palmer | (England) Chelsea | Undisclosed | |
| 3 August 2019 | DM | (France) | Han-Noah Massengo | (France) AS Monaco | £8,000,000 | |
| 8 August 2019 | DM | (Hungary) | Ádám Nagy | (Italy) Bologna | Undisclosed | |
| 23 August 2019 | CB | (Wales) | Ashley Williams | (England) Everton | Free transfer | |
| 16 October 2019 | CF | (Spain) | Rodri | (Spain) Granada | Free transfer | |
| 30 January 2020 | CF | (Bermuda) | Nahki Wells | (England) Burnley | Undisclosed | |

=== Loans in ===
| Date from | Position | Nationality | Name | From | Date until | Ref. |
|---|---|---|---|---|---|---|
| 7 August 2019 | RB | (Portugal) | Pedro Pereira | (Portugal) Benfica | 30 June 2020 | |
| 8 August 2019 | CF | (Democratic Republic of the Congo) | Benik Afobe | (England) Stoke City | 30 June 2020 | |
| 31 January 2020 | CB | (Croatia) | Filip Benković | (England) Leicester City | 30 June 2020 | |
| 31 January 2020 | CM | (Norway) | Markus Henriksen | (England) Hull City | 30 June 2020 | |

=== Loans out ===
| Date from | Position | Nationality | Name | To | Date until | Ref. |
|---|---|---|---|---|---|---|
| 1 July 2019 | CM | (Wales) | Joe Morrell | (England) Lincoln City | 30 June 2020 | |
| 1 July 2019 | DM | (England) | James Morton | (England) Forest Green Rovers | 30 June 2020 | |
| 3 July 2019 | LB | (England) | Cameron Pring | (England) Walsall | 30 June 2020 | |
| 5 July 2019 | CB | (England) | Robbie Cundy | (England) Exeter City | 2 September 2019 | |
| 5 July 2019 | GK | (England) | Max O'Leary | (England) Shrewsbury Town | 30 June 2020 | |
| 12 July 2019 | LM | (England) | George Nurse | (Wales) Newport County | 30 June 2020 | |
| 26 July 2019 | CF | (Northern Ireland) | Rory Holden | (England) Walsall | 30 June 2020 | |
| 31 July 2019 | LB | (England) | Vincent Harper | (England) Gloucester City | | |
| 7 August 2019 | GK | (England) | Joe Wollacott | (England) Forest Green Rovers | 30 June 2020 | |
| 8 August 2019 | SS | (England) | Jamie Paterson | (England) Derby County | 30 June 2020 | |
| 8 August 2019 | RB | (England) | Zak Vyner | (Scotland) Aberdeen | 30 June 2020 | |
| 19 August 2019 | CF | (England) | Matty Taylor | (England) Oxford United | 30 June 2020 | |
| 28 August 2019 | CF | (England) | Freddie Hinds | (England) Colchester United | 1 January 2020 | |
| 2 September 2019 | CB | (England) | Tom Harrison | (England) Gloucester City | October 2019 | |
| 2 September 2019 | LM | (England) | Jonny Smith | (England) Oldham Athletic | 30 June 2020 | |
| 2 September 2019 | CM | (England) | Liam Walsh | (England) Coventry City | 30 June 2020 | |
| 3 September 2019 | CB | (England) | Robbie Cundy | (England) Torquay United | 1 January 2020 | |
| 19 October 2019 | CB | (England) | Harvey Smith | (England) Gloucester City | November 2019 | |
| 28 October 2019 | CF | (The Gambia) | Saikou Janneh | (England) Torquay United | 1 January 2020 | |
| 3 January 2020 | CM | (England) | Tyreeq Bakinson | (England) Plymouth Argyle | 30 June 2020 | |
| 9 January 2020 | RW | (England) | Hakeeb Adelakun | (England) Rotherham United | 30 June 2020 | |
| 16 January 2020 | AM | (England) | Sammie Szmodics | (England) Peterborough United | 30 June 2020 | |
| 21 January 2020 | CB | (Australia) | Bailey Wright | (England) Sunderland | 30 June 2020 | |
| 31 January 2020 | CB | (England) | Taylor Moore | (England) Blackpool | 30 June 2020 | |
| 31 January 2020 | LW | (England) | Antoine Semenyo | (England) Sunderland | 30 June 2020 | |
| 14 February 2020 | CB | (England) | Aden Baldwin | (England) Eastleigh | 30 June 2020 | |

=== Transfers out ===
| Date | Position | Nationality | Name | To | Fee | Ref. |
|---|---|---|---|---|---|---|
| 1 July 2019 | LM | (England) | Jake Andrews | (England) Torquay United | Free transfer | |
| 1 July 2019 | CF | (Sudan) | Mohamed Eisa | (England) Peterborough United | Undisclosed | |
| 1 July 2019 | GK | (England) | Frank Fielding | (England) Millwall | Released | |
| 1 July 2019 | LB | (England) | Lloyd Kelly | (England) Bournemouth | £13,000,000 | |
| 1 July 2019 | GK | (New Zealand) | Stefan Marinovic | (New Zealand) Wellington Phoenix | Released | |
| 1 July 2019 | CB | (Italy) | Eros Pisano | Free agent | Released | |
| 3 August 2019 | CB | (England) | Adam Webster | (England) Brighton & Hove Albion | £20,000,000 | |
| 6 August 2019 | CB | (England) | Aaron Parsons | (England) Weston-super-Mare | Free transfer | |
| 8 August 2019 | CM | (England) | Marlon Pack | (Wales) Cardiff City | Undisclosed | |
| 30 January 2020 | CM | (England) | Josh Brownhill | (England) Burnley | £9,000,000 | |

== Pre-season ==
The Robins confirmed pre-season friendlies against Hallen AFC Wimbledon, Forest Green Rovers, Crystal Palace and Weston-super-Mare.

| 6 July 2019 Friendly | Hallen | 0–14 | Bristol City | Hallen |
| 15:00 BST | | Report | Weimann 3', 13', 24'; Szmodics 10', 17'; Watkins 22'; Semenyo 46', 57'; Taylor 62', 90+4'; J.Smith 69', 90+6'; Lemonheigh-Evans 74', 90+9' | Stadium: The Hallen Centre; Attendance: 1,764 |

| 9 July 2019 Friendly | AFC Wimbledon | 2–3 | Bristol City | Norbiton |
| 19:45 BST | Roscrow 68' (pen.); Folivi 88' (pen.) | Report | Webster 32'; Diédhiou 47', 50' | Stadium: Cherry Red Records Stadium |

| 13 July 2019 Friendly | Bristol City | A-A(1–0) | Derby County | Tampa, Florida |
| TBC | Diédhiou 15' | https://www.bcfc.co.uk/news/report-bristol-city-1-derby-county-0-game-1/ Game Called off at 45' due to a warning siren at 15' then adverse weather at 45 | | Stadium: IMG Academy |

| 14 July 2019 Friendly | Bristol City | 1–2 | Derby County | Tampa, Florida |
| 4:00BST | Janneh 43' | https://www.bcfc.co.uk/news/report-bristol-city-1-derby-county-2-game-2/ Replay for day before | Bennett 13'; Anya 40' | Stadium: IMG Academy |

| 19 July 2019 Friendly | Sarasota Metropolis | 0–6 | Bristol City | Tampa, Florida |
| 09:30 EDT | | | Pack 6', 16'; Weimann 46'; Szmodics 49'; Brownhill 51'; Moore 103' | Stadium: IMG Academy |

| 24 July 2019 Friendly | Forest Green Rovers | 3–4 | Bristol City | Nailsworth |
| 19:45 BST | McCoulsky 3', 43'; Collins 56' | Report | Brownhill 45'; Weimann 77' (pen.); Szmodics 86'; Webster 90+1' | Stadium: The New Lawn |

| 27 July 2019 Friendly | Bristol City | 0–5 | Crystal Palace | Bristol |
| 15:00 BST | | | Schlupp 15'; Townsend 34'; Benteke 54'; Meyer 70'; Wickham 75' | Stadium: Ashton Gate |

| 3 August 2019 Friendly | Weston-super-Mare | 3–4 | Bristol City XI | Weston-super-Mare |
| TBC BST | | Report | | Stadium: Woodspring Stadium |

== Competitions ==
=== League table ===
| Pos | Team | Pld | W | D | L | GF | GA | GD | Pts |
|---|---|---|---|---|---|---|---|---|---|
| 9 | Preston North End | 46 | 18 | 12 | 16 | 59 | 54 | +5 | 66 |
| 10 | Derby County | 46 | 17 | 13 | 16 | 62 | 64 | −2 | 64 |
| 11 | Blackburn Rovers | 46 | 17 | 12 | 17 | 66 | 63 | +3 | 63 |
| 12 | Bristol City | 46 | 17 | 12 | 17 | 60 | 65 | −5 | 63 |
| 13 | Queens Park Rangers | 46 | 16 | 10 | 20 | 67 | 76 | −9 | 58 |
| 14 | Reading | 46 | 15 | 11 | 20 | 59 | 58 | +1 | 56 |
| 15 | Stoke City | 46 | 16 | 8 | 22 | 62 | 68 | −6 | 56 |

Source: EFL Official Website
Rules for classification: 1) Points; 2) Goal difference; 3) Number of goals scored; 4) Head-to-head results; 5) Wins; 6) Away goals; 7) Penalty points (sec 9.5); 8) 12-point sending off offences

==== Results by matchday ====
| Matchday | 1 | 2 | 3 | 4 | 5 | 6 | 7 | 8 | 9 | 10 | 11 | 12 | 13 | 14 | 15 | 16 | 17 | 18 | 19 | 20 | 21 | 22 | 23 | 24 | 25 | 26 | 27 | 28 | 29 | 30 | 31 | 32 | 33 | 34 | 35 | 36 | 37 | 38 | 39 | 40 | 41 | 42 | 43 | 44 | 45 | 46 |
|---|---|---|---|---|---|---|---|---|---|---|---|---|---|---|---|---|---|---|---|---|---|---|---|---|---|---|---|---|---|---|---|---|---|---|---|---|---|---|---|---|---|---|---|---|---|---|
| Ground | H | A | H | A | A | H | A | H | A | A | H | A | H | H | A | A | H | A | H | A | H | H | A | A | H | H | A | H | A | A | H | H | A | H | A | A | H | A | H | A | H | H | A | H | A | H |
| Result | L | D | W | W | W | D | W | D | D | D | W | L | W | D | D | W | D | L | W | W | L | L | L | L | W | L | W | W | W | W | L | W | L | L | L | D | D | L | L | L | L | W | W | D | L | D |
| Position | 23 | 21 | 11 | 7 | 4 | 5 | 4 | 7 | 8 | 7 | 6 | 9 | 4 | 6 | 6 | 6 | 7 | 7 | 5 | 4 | 4 | 7 | 8 | 10 | 8 | 11 | 9 | 8 | 6 | 6 | 7 | 7 | 7 | 7 | 7 | 7 | 7 | 10 | 12 | 12 | 12 | 12 | 11 | 10 | 12 | 12 |

Updated to match(es) played on 22 July 2020. Source: BBC Sport
A = Away; H = Home; W = Win; D = Draw; L = Loss

==== Result summary ====
| Overall | | | | | | | | Home | | | | | | Away | | | | | |
| Pld | W | D | L | GF | GA | GD | Pts | W | D | L | GF | GA | GD | W | D | L | GF | GA | GD |
|---|---|---|---|---|---|---|---|---|---|---|---|---|---|---|---|---|---|---|---|
| 46 | 17 | 12 | 17 | 60 | 65 | −5 | 63 | 8 | 7 | 8 | 29 | 32 | −3 | 9 | 5 | 9 | 31 | 33 | −2 |

Last updated: 22 July 2020.
Source: BBC Sport

==== Matches ====
On Thursday, 20 June 2019, the EFL Championship fixtures were revealed. The football season was suspended due to COVID-19 pandemic, and restarted on 20 June 2020.

| 4 August 2019 1 | Bristol City | 1–3 | Leeds United | Ashton Gate |
| 16:30 BST | Weimann 79' | Report | Hernández 26'; Bamford 57'; Harrison 72' | Stadium: Ashton Gate Stadium; Attendance: 23,553 (2,295 away); Referee: Tim Robinson |
Note: Live on Sky Sports

| 10 August 2019 2 | Birmingham City | 1–1 | Bristol City | Bordesley |
| 15:00 BST | Jutkiewicz 64' | Report | Rowe 83' | Stadium: St Andrew's Trillion Trophy Stadium; Attendance: 21,808; Referee: Oliver Langford |
Note: Broadcast Live for Overseas Fans ONLY on RobinsTV

| 17 August 2019 3 | Bristol City | 2–0 | Queens Park Rangers | Ashton Gate |
| 15:00 BST | Nagy 35'; Afobe 59' | Report | | Stadium: Ashton Gate Stadium; Attendance: 21,654; Referee: Robert Jones |

| 20 August 2019 4 | Derby County | 1–2 | Bristol City | Derby |
| 19:45 BST | Marriott 85' | Report | Weimann 16'; Brownhill 45+1' | Stadium: Pride Park; Attendance: 25,546; Referee: Steve Martin |

| 24 August 2019 5 | Hull City | 1–3 | Bristol City | Kingston upon Hull |
| 15:00 BST | Bowen 44' | Report | Rowe (yellow card) 35'; Afobe 41' (pen.), 80'; Palmer (yellow card) 63'; Burke 78' (o.g.); Weimann (yellow card) 87' | Stadium: KCOM Stadium; Attendance: 10,458; Referee: Dean Whitestone |

| 31 August 2019 6 | Bristol City | 2–2 | Middlesbrough | Ashton Gate |
| 12:30 BST | Palmer 44'; Rowe 81' | Report | Moore 64' (o.g.); Assombalonga 68' | Stadium: Ashton Gate Stadium; Attendance: 20,757; Referee: Lee Mason |
Note: Live on Sky Sports

| 14 September 2019 7 | Stoke City | 1–2 | Bristol City | Stoke-on-Trent |
| 15:00 BST | Clucas 4' | Report | Diédhiou 55'; Edwards 62' (o.g.) | Stadium: bet365 Stadium; Attendance: 22,357; Referee: Geoff Eltringham |

| 21 September 2019 8 | Bristol City | 0–0 | Swansea City | Ashton Gate |
| 15:00 BST | Moore (yellow card) 15' | Report | Grimes (yellow card) 33'; Bidwell (red card) 90' | Stadium: Ashton Gate Stadium; Attendance: 22,885; Referee: Tony Harrington |

| 28 September 2019 9 | Preston North End | 3–3 | Bristol City | Preston |
| 15:00 BST | Fisher (yellow card) 39'; Gallagher 45+2' (pen.); Johnson 51' (pen.); Bauer 70' | Report | Moore 29'; Weimann 36' (yellow card) 82'; Baker 60' | Stadium: Deepdale; Attendance: 12,005; Referee: Andy Davies |

| 2 October 2019 10 | Brentford | 1–1 | Bristol City | Brentford |
| 19:45 BST | Da Silva 64'; Canós (yellow card) 81' | Report | Hunt (yellow card) 81'; Weimann 87' | Stadium: Griffin Park; Attendance: 11,433; Referee: Oliver Langford |

| 5 October 2019 11 | Bristol City | 1–0 | Reading | Ashton Gate |
| 15:00 BST | Diédhiou 12'; Rowe (yellow card) 18' | Report | Moore (yellow card) 65'; Rinomhota (yellow card) 74' | Stadium: Ashton Gate Stadium; Attendance: 21,419; Referee: Steve Martin |

| 19 October 2019 12 | Luton Town | 3–0 | Bristol City | Luton |
| 15:00 BST | Tunnicliffe (yellow card) 51'; Mpanzu 56' (yellow card) 84'; Cornick 62'; Williams 90+5' (o.g.) | Report | Diédhiou (yellow card) 63'; Hunt (yellow card) 90+2' | Stadium: Kenilworth Road; Attendance: 10,064; Referee: Graham Scott |

| 23 October 2019 13 | Bristol City | 2–1 | Charlton Athletic | Ashton Gate |
| 19:45 BST | Diédhiou 75' (red card) 86'; Pereira (yellow card) 83'; Weimann (yellow card) 90+7'; Brownhill 90+8' | Report | Kayal (yellow card) 14'; Pratley (yellow card) 55'; Bonne 65' (yellow card) 90+1'; Phillips (yellow card) 85'; Aneke (yellow card) 90+4' | Stadium: Ashton Gate Stadium; Attendance: 20,916; Referee: James Linington |

| 27 October 2019 14 | Bristol City | 2–2 | Wigan Athletic | Ashton Gate |
| 13:30 BST | Weimann 39'; Baker (yellow card) 63'; Pereira 86' | | Robinson (yellow card) 4'; Dunkley 44' 53'; Morsy (yellow card) 68' | Stadium: Ashton Gate Stadium; Attendance: 22,246; Referee: John Brooks |

| 1 November 2019 15 | Barnsley | 2–2 | Bristol City | Barnsley |
| 19:45 GMT | Diaby (yellow card) 42'; Halme 77'; Thomas (yellow card) 84'; Woodrow 90+4' | Report | Williams 43'; Weimann 71' | Stadium: Oakwell; Attendance: 12,178; Referee: Jarred Gillett |
Note: Live on Sky Sports

| 10 November 2019 16 | Cardiff City | 0–1 | Bristol City | Cardiff |
| 12:00 GMT | Pack (yellow card) 19' | Report | Nagy (yellow card) 27'; Rowe (yellow card) 53'; Brownhill 67' | Stadium: Cardiff City Stadium; Attendance: 23,846; Referee: Tony Harrington |
Note: Live on Sky Sports

| 23 November 2019 17 | Bristol City | 0–0 | Nottingham Forest | Ashton Gate |
| 15:00 GMT | Rodri (yellow card) 84' | Report | Ameobi (yellow card) 36'; Yates (red card) 56'; Samba (yellow card) 86' | Stadium: Ashton Gate Stadium; Attendance: 23,573; Referee: Craig Pawson |

| 27 November 2019 18 | West Bromwich Albion | 4–1 | Bristol City | West Bromwich |
| 20:00 GMT | Gibbs 10'; Pereira 39'; Robson-Kanu 82'; Austin 87' | Report | Williams (yellow card) 52'; Smith (yellow card) 56'; Diédhiou 80' | Stadium: The Hawthorns; Attendance: 22,197; Referee: Geoff Eltringham |

| 30 November 2019 19 | Bristol City | 5–2 | Huddersfield Town | Ashton Gate |
| 15:00 GMT | Brownhill 11'; Kongolo 30' (o.g.); Eliasson 36'; Williams 40'; Weimann 49' | Report | Grant 35'; Bacuna 57'; O'Brien (yellow card) 86' | Stadium: Ashton Gate Stadium; Attendance: 20,762; Referee: Darren England |

| 7 December 2019 20 | Fulham | 1–2 | Bristol City | Fulham |
| 15:00 GMT | Odoi (yellow card) 40'; Knockaert (yellow card) 70'; Kamara 86'; Cairney (yellow card) 90+3'; Johansen (yellow card) 90+4'; Rodák (yellow card) 90+7'; Mawson (yellow card) 90+8' | Report | Brownhill 26'; Eliasson (yellow card) 57'; Diédhiou 76'; Hunt (yellow card) 90+4' | Stadium: Craven Cottage; Attendance: 18,779; Referee: Jeremy Simpson |

| 10 December 2019 21 | Bristol City | 1–2 | Millwall | Ashton Gate |
| 19:45 GMT | O'Dowda 84' | Report | Wallace 11'; Cooper 70' | Stadium: Ashton Gate Stadium; Attendance: 19,742; Referee: Gavin Ward |

| 14 December 2019 22 | Bristol City | 0–2 | Blackburn Rovers | Ashton Gate |
| 15:00 GMT | Weimann (yellow card) 79' | Report | Johnson 2'; Gallagher (yellow card) 33'; Armstrong 77'; Lenihan (yellow card) 86' | Stadium: Ashton Gate Stadium; Attendance: 21,180; Referee: John Brooks |

| 22 December 2019 23 | Sheffield Wednesday | 1–0 | Bristol City | Owlerton |
| 12:00 GMT | Luongo (yellow card) 70'; Bannan 85' (pen.) | Report | Smith (yellow card) 11'; Palmer (yellow card) 81'; Bentley (yellow card) 84' | Stadium: Hillsborough; Attendance: 23,180; Referee: Tony Harrington |

| 26 December 2019 24 | Charlton Athletic | 3–2 | Bristol City | Charlton |
| 15:00 GMT | Bonne (yellow card) 32' (goal) 40', 77'; Doughty 82'; Morgan (yellow card) 85'; Oshilaja (yellow card) 90+7' | Report | Brownhill (yellow card) 18'; Weimann 46'; Eliasson 60' | Stadium: The Valley; Attendance: 18,058; Referee: Keith Stroud |

| 29 December 2019 25 | Bristol City | 3–0 | Luton Town | Ashton Gate |
| 15:00 GMT | Watkins 4'; Diédhiou 44' (pen.); Williams (yellow card) 49'; Weimann 66' | Report | Berry (yellow card) 32'; Bradley (yellow card) 58'; Collins (yellow card) 63'; Pearson (yellow card) 76' | Stadium: Ashton Gate Stadium; Attendance: 22,216; Referee: Oliver Langford |

| 1 January 2020 26 | Bristol City | 0–4 | Brentford | Ashton Gate |
| 15:00 GMT | Williams (yellow card) 11'; Williams (red card) 13'; Dasilva (yellow card) 54'; Weimann (yellow card) 58' | Report | Mbeumo 6'; Watkins (yellow card) 11'; Benrahma 26'; Henry (yellow card) 61'; Watkins 82'; Watkins 90' | Stadium: Ashton Gate Stadium; Attendance: 20,858; Referee: Matt Dohohue |

| 11 January 2020 27 | Wigan Athletic | 0–2 | Bristol City | Wigan |
| 15:00 GMT | Robinson (yellow card) 54' | Report | Paterson 77'; Diédhiou 79'; Baker (yellow card) 90+3' | Stadium: DW Stadium; Attendance: 9,074; Referee: Stephen Martin |

| 18 January 2020 28 | Bristol City | 1–0 | Barnsley | Ashton Gate |
| 15:00 GMT | Eliasson 87' (yellow card) 88' | Report | Halme (yellow card) 61'; Williams (yellow card) 69' | Stadium: Ashton Gate Stadium; Attendance: 20,570; Referee: Darren Bond |

| 28 January 2020 29 | Reading | 0–1 | Bristol City | Reading |
| 20:00 GMT | Gunter (yellow card) 45+1' | Report | Diédhiou (yellow card) 33'; Paterson 62'; Smith (yellow card) 66'; Brownhill (yellow card) 74' | Stadium: Madejski Stadium; Attendance: 11,633; Referee: James Linington |

| 1 February 2020 30 | Queens Park Rangers | 0–1 | Bristol City | Shepherd's Bush |
| 15:00 GMT | | Report | Diédhiou 16' | Stadium: Kiyan Prince Foundation Stadium; Attendance: 13,713; Referee: Dean Whitestone |

| 7 February 2020 31 | Bristol City | 1–3 | Birmingham City | Ashton Gate |
| 19:45 GMT | Paterson 1' | Report | Hogan 23'; Weimann 30' (o.g.); Jutkiewicz 90+2' | Stadium: Ashton Gate Stadium; Attendance: 22,065; Referee: Gavin Ward |

| 12 February 2020 32 | Bristol City | 3–2 | Derby County | Ashton Gate |
| 19:45 GMT | Wells 38'; Benković 44'; Diédhiou 58' | Report | Waghorn (yellow card) 12' (goal) 61'; Martin 82' | Stadium: Ashton Gate Stadium; Attendance: 20,368; Referee: Geoff Eltringham |

| 15 February 2020 33 | Leeds United | 1–0 | Bristol City | Beeston, Leeds |
| 15:00 GMT | Ayling 16'; Dallas (yellow card) 55'; Klich (yellow card) 90+2' | Report | O'Dowda (yellow card) 58'; Kalas (yellow card) 81' | Stadium: Elland Road; Attendance: 35,819; Referee: Tim Robinson |

| 22 February 2020 34 | Bristol City | 0–3 | West Bromwich Albion | Ashton Gate |
| 15:00 GMT | Benković (yellow card) 29'; Paterson (yellow card) 77' | Report | O'Shea (yellow card) 15'; Robinson 32'; Robson-Kanu 36', 79'; Sawyers (red card) 77' | Stadium: Ashton Gate Stadium; Attendance: 24,022; Referee: Darren England |

| 25 February 2020 35 | Huddersfield Town | 2–1 | Bristol City | Huddersfield |
| 19:45 GMT | Toffolo (yellow card) 18'; Willock 39'; Grant 63' (pen.); O'Brien (yellow card) 70' | Report | Benković (yellow card) 11'; Hunt (yellow card) 17'; Kalas (yellow card) 45'; Diédhiou 88'; Weimann (yellow card) 89' | Stadium: John Smith’s Stadium; Attendance: 19,703; Referee: Robert Jones |

| 29 February 2020 36 | Millwall | 1–1 | Bristol City | Bermondsey |
| 15:00 GMT | Smith 51'; Molumby (yellow card) 83' | Report | Pereira 10' | Stadium: The Den; Attendance: 13,584; Referee: Andy Davies |

| 7 March 2020 37 | Bristol City | 1–1 | Fulham | Ashton Gate |
| 12:30 GMT | Pereira (yellow card) 60'; Wells 70'; Benković (yellow card) 75' | Report | Arter (yellow card) 41'; Odoi (yellow card) 48'; Cairney 84' | Stadium: Ashton Gate Stadium; Attendance: 23,796; Referee: David Coote |

| 20 June 2020 38 | Blackburn Rovers | 3–1 | Bristol City | Blackburn |
| 15:00 BST | Evans 37' (yellow card) 87'; Lenihan (yellow card) 56'; Adarabioyo 61'; Armstrong 71' | Report | Pereira (yellow card) 12'; Massengo (yellow card) 16'; Paterson 34' | Stadium: Ewood Park; Attendance: 0 Referee: Oliver Langford |
Note: Season was suspended until 3 April 2020, due to the COVID-19 pandemic. The match was rescheduled to 20 June.

| 28 June 2020 39 | Bristol City | 1–2 | Sheffield Wednesday | Ashton Gate |
| 12:00 BST | O'Dowda (yellow card) 45'; Wells 69' | Report | Wickham 13'; Rhodes (yellow card) 24'; Lee (yellow card) 39'; Luongo 59' | Stadium: Ashton Gate Stadium; Attendance: 0 Referee: John Brooks |
Note: Season was suspended until 3 April 2020, due to the COVID-19 pandemic. The match was rescheduled to 28 June, and was broadcast live on Sky Sports.

| 1 July 2020 40 | Nottingham Forest | 1–0 | Bristol City | West Bridgford |
| 19:45 BST | Silva 63' | Report | Weimann (yellow card) 45+3'; Williams (red card) 78'; Vyner (yellow card) 84' | Stadium: City Ground; Attendance: 0 Referee: Darren Bond |
Note: Season was suspended until 3 April 2020, due to the COVID-19 pandemic. The match was rescheduled to 1 July.

| 4 July 2020 41 | Bristol City | 0–1 | Cardiff City | Ashton Gate |
| 15:00 BST | Smith (yellow card) 23' | Report | Ward 85' | Stadium: Ashton Gate Stadium; Attendance: 0 Referee: Tim Robinson |
Note: On 3 April, the English Football League decided to postpone all football until safe to do so due to the COVID-19 pandemic. The match was rescheduled to 4 July, and was broadcast live on Sky Sports.

| 8 July 2020 42 | Bristol City | 2–1 | Hull City | Ashton Gate |
| 18:00 BST | Diédhiou 41'; Paterson 53' | Report | Honeyman (yellow card) 22'; De Wijs 60' (yellow card) 90+4'; Wilks (yellow card) 90+2' | Stadium: Ashton Gate Stadium; Attendance: 0 Referee: Gavin Ward |
Note: On 3 April, the English Football League decided to postpone all football until safe to do so due to the COVID-19 pandemic. The match was rescheduled to 8 July.

| 11 July 2020 43 | Middlesbrough | 1–3 | Bristol City | Middlesbrough |
| 15:00 BST | Johnson (yellow card) 54'; Assombalonga 82' | Report | Wells 6', 79'; Paterson 42' | Stadium: Riverside Stadium; Attendance: 0 Referee: Darren England |
Note: On 3 April, the English Football League decided to postpone all football until safe to do so due to the COVID-19 pandemic. The match was rescheduled to 11 July.

| 15 July 2020 44 | Bristol City | 1–1 | Stoke City | Ashton Gate |
| 17:00 BST | Benković 45+2'; Paterson (yellow card) 56' | Report | Batth 64' | Stadium: Ashton Gate Stadium; Attendance: 0 Referee: James Linington |
Note: On 3 April, the English Football League decided to postpone all football until safe to do so due to the COVID-19 pandemic. The match was rescheduled to 15 July.

| 18 July 2020 45 | Swansea City | 1–0 | Bristol City | Swansea |
| 15:00 BST | Roberts 45+2' | Report | | Stadium: Liberty Stadium; Attendance: 0 Referee: Darren Bond |
Note: On 3 April, the English Football League decided to postpone all football until safe to do so due to the COVID-19 pandemic. The match was rescheduled to 18 July.

| 22 July 2020 46 | Bristol City | 1–1 | Preston North End | Ashton Gate |
| 19:30 BST | Diédhiou 48' | Report | Maguire 16' | Stadium: Ashton Gate Stadium; Attendance: 0 Referee: Andy Woolmer |
Note: On 3 April, the English Football League decided to postpone all football until safe to do so due to the COVID-19 pandemic. The match was rescheduled to 22 July.

=== FA Cup ===
The third round draw was made live on BBC Two from Etihad Stadium, Micah Richards and Tony Adams conducted the draw.

| 4 January 2020 Third round | Bristol City | 1–1 | Shrewsbury Town | Ashton Gate |
| 12:31 GMT | Diédhiou 30' | Report | Goss 48' | Stadium: Ashton Gate Stadium; Attendance: 9,730; Referee: John Busby |

| 14 January 2020 Third round replay | Shrewsbury Town | 1–0 | Bristol City | Shrewsbury |
| 19:45 GMT | Goss (yellow card) 30'; Pierre 89'; Murphy (yellow card) 90+5' | Report | Hunt (yellow card) 36' | Stadium: Montgomery Waters Meadow; Attendance: 7,194; Referee: David Webb |

=== EFL Cup ===
The first round draw was made on 20 June.

| 13 August 2019 First round | Queens Park Rangers | 3–3 (5–4 p) | Bristol City | Shepherd's Bush |
| 19:45 BST | Wells 15'; Chair 26'; Manning 86' (pen.) | Report | Diédhiou 13'; Hunt 41'; Walsh 59' | Stadium: The Kiyan Prince Foundation Stadium; Attendance: 5,795; Referee: Andy Davies |
| | Penalties |
| | Manning (penalty scored); Mlakar (penalty scored); Wells (penalty scored); Smith (penalty missed); Barbet (penalty missed); Chair (penalty scored); Amos (penalty scored) | | Diédhiou (penalty missed); Walsh (penalty scored); O'Dowda (penalty scored); Eliasson (penalty missed); Taylor (penalty scored); Rowe (penalty scored); Wright (penalty missed) |
