= Marco Tumminello =

Italian footballer

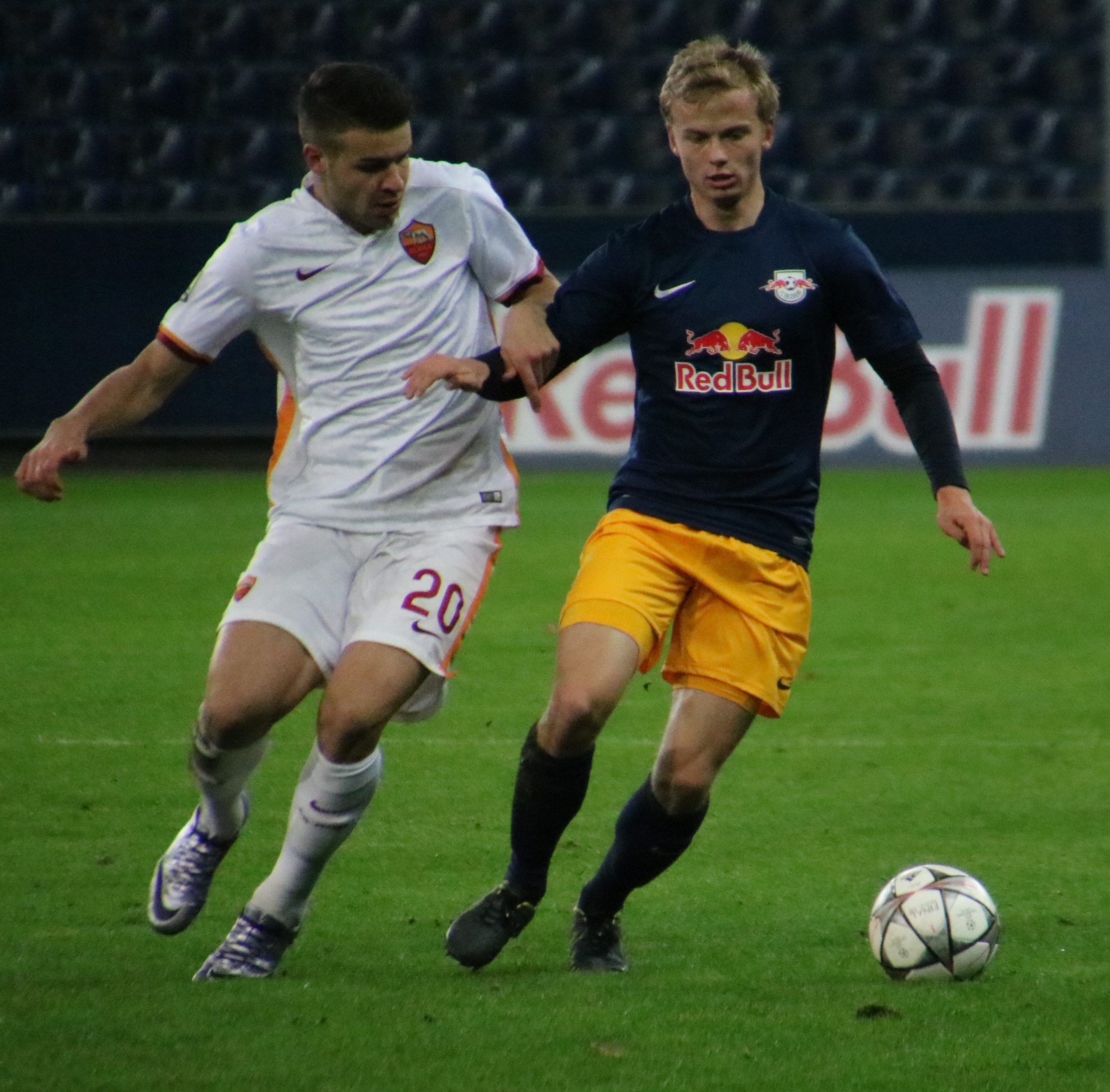
- Tumminello (left) fighting for the ball

Personal information
- Date of birth: 6 November 1998 (age 28)
- Place of birth: Erice, Italy
- Height: 1.86 m (6 ft 1 in)
- Position: Striker

Team information
- Current team: Benevento
- Number: 93

Youth career
- 2003–2011: Trapani
- 2011: ASD Valerio Leto
- 2011–2012: Palermo
- 2012–2017: Roma

Senior career*
Years	Team	Apps	(Gls)
2016–2018	Roma	2	(0)
2017–2018	→ Crotone (loan)	10	(3)
2018–2022	Atalanta	2	(0)
2019	→ Lecce (loan)	6	(1)
2019–2020	→ Pescara (loan)	3	(2)
2021	→ SPAL (loan)	5	(0)
2021–2022	→ Reggina (loan)	14	(1)
2022–2025	Crotone	73	(30)
2023	→ Gelbison (loan)	17	(2)
2025–	Benevento	32	(11)

International career^{‡}
2013	Italy U15	1	(0)
2015	Italy U17	2	(0)
2015–2016	Italy U18	6	(2)
2016–2017	Italy U19	7	(1)
2018	Italy U20	1	(0)
2019	Italy U21	2	(2)
- * Club domestic league appearances and goals as of 1 May 2026 ‡ National team caps and goals as of 10 September 2019

Marco Tumminello (born 6 November 1998) is an Italian professional footballer who plays as a striker for Serie B side Benevento.

== Club career ==
Tumminello is a youth product from A.S. Roma. He made his Serie A debut on 6 January 2016 against Chievo Verona, replacing Alessandro Florenzi in extra time.

On 31 August 2017, Tumminiello joined Crotone on a season-long loan deal.

On 22 June 2018, Tumminello signed a contract with Serie A side Atalanta.

On 28 January 2019 he was loaned to Serie B club Lecce.

On 20 July 2019, Tumminello joined Pescara on loan until 30 June 2020. After starting the season on a hot streak with 2 goals in 3 games, Tumminello suffered Anterior cruciate ligament injury which forced him to miss most of the season. He was originally expected to return in April 2020, but did not appear in any more games for Pescara.

On 22 January 2021, Tumminello joined SPAL on loan with option to buy until the end of the season.

Tumminello joined Serie B club Reggina on a season-long loan on 17 August 2021.

On 17 August 2022, Tumminello returned to Crotone (now in Serie C) on a four-year contract. On 19 January 2023, Tumminello was loaned by Gelbison.

== International career ==
He made his debut with the Italy U21 squad on 6 September 2019, scoring a goal in the friendly match won 4–0 against Moldova.

== Career statistics ==
As of 13 April 2019

Club	Season	Serie A		Coppa Italia		Continental		Others		Total	
Club	Season	App	Goals	App	Goals	App	Goals	App	Goals	App	Goals
A.S. Roma	2015–16	1	0	0	0	–	–	–	–	1	0
A.S. Roma	2016–17	0	0	0	0	–	–	–	–	0	0
A.S. Roma	2017–18	1	0	0	0	–	–	–	–	1	0
A.S. Roma	Total	2	0	0	0	0	0	0	0	2	0
Crotone (loan)	2017–18	9	3	0	0	–	–	–	–	10	3
Atalanta	2018–19	2	0	0	0	1	0	–	–	3	0
Atalanta	Total	2	0	0	0	1	0	0	0	3	0
Lecce (loan)	2018–19	6	1	0	0	–	–	–	–	6	1
Career total		19	4	0	0	1	0	0	0	20	4
