= Simy =

Nigerian footballer (born 1992)

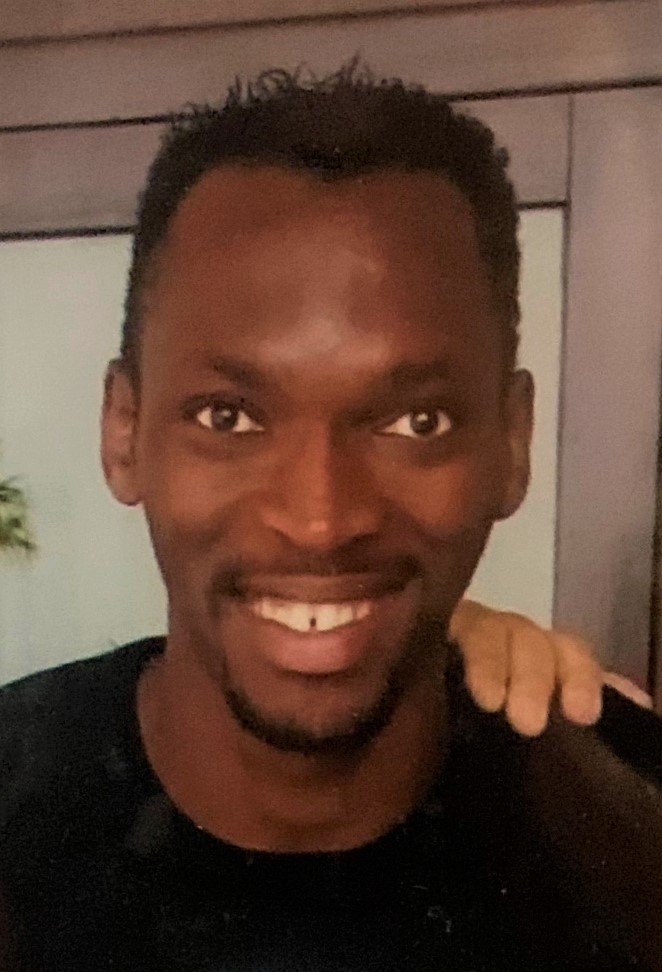
- Simy in 2019

Personal information
- Full name: Simeon Tochukwu Nwankwo
- Date of birth: 7 May 1992 (age 34)
- Place of birth: Onitsha, Nigeria
- Height: 1.98 m (6 ft 6 in)
- Position: Striker

Team information
- Current team: Al-Tai
- Number: 9

Youth career
- Guo FC
- Portimonense

Senior career*
Years	Team	Apps	(Gls)
2011–2013	Portimonense	55	(17)
2013–2016	Gil Vicente	88	(29)
2016–2022	Crotone	152	(64)
2021–2022	→ Salernitana (loan)	19	(1)
2022–2025	Salernitana	38	(8)
2022	→ Parma (loan)	12	(1)
2022–2023	→ Benevento (loan)	22	(0)
2025–2026	Al-Orobah	28	(28)
2026–	Al-Tai	0	(0)

International career
2018	Nigeria	4	(0)
- * Club domestic league appearances and goals as of 3 July 2026

Simeon Tochukwu Nwankwo (born 7 May 1992), known simply as Simy, is a Nigerian professional footballer who plays as a striker for Saudi club Al-Tai. He has also previously represented the Nigeria national team.

Simy became the first African footballer to finish as top scorer in an Italian professional league, recording 20 goals with Crotone during the 2019–20 Serie B campaign. With 66 total goals in all competitions, he is also Crotone's all-time top scorer.

== Club career ==
In July 2016, Simy signed for Crotone, newly promoted to Serie A.

He scored seven goals during the 2017–18 campaign, tied with Ante Budimir for second-most for the club and only one behind top scorer Marcello Trotta. This included a memorable overhead kick in a 1–1 draw against champions Juventus on 19 April 2018. Crotone, however, would be relegated at season's end.

Although the club struggled to a twelfth place finish in their return to Serie B, Simy was able to find his form and have his best season since moving to Italy, finishing first on his team and sixth overall in goals with fourteen. He bested this in the 2019–20 campaign, topping Serie B with twenty goals and helping his team earn promotion back to Italy's top flight. Simy was prolific again during the 2020–21 season, scoring 20 league goals, but this was not enough to prevent Crotone from being relegated after a single season in the top flight. On 19 August 2021, Simy moved to newly-promoted Serie A club Salernitana on a season-long loan.

=== Salernitana ===
On 9 January 2022, Simy's rights were acquired fully by Salernitana for a fee of €3.5m. On 31 January 2022, he was loaned out to Serie B club Parma for the remainder of the season with an option to buy.

On 1 September 2022, Simy moved to Benevento on loan with an option to buy.

=== Al-Orobah ===
In September 2025, Simy joined Saudi FDL club Al-Orobah.

== International career ==
On 25 May 2018, Simy was called up to the Nigeria national team's camp by coach Gernot Rohr in preparation for the 2018 FIFA World Cup in Russia. Three days later, he made his international debut in a 1–1 draw against the DR Congo. In June he was named in Nigeria's final 23-man squad for the World Cup. He made his first appearance at the tournament against Croatia where he came in as a second-half substitute whilst Nigeria were 2–0 down. He also played as substitute in the 2–1 defeat against Argentina who eliminated Nigeria from the World Cup.

== Personal life ==
Simy is the eldest of three children. His brother, a physiotherapist, and sister, a nurse, are twins. Simy and his wife are Catholic and have a son. Simy has been the subject of racial abuse on social media during his time in Crotone, including wishes that his son 'would die of pancreatic cancer'. Taking a stand against racism, Crotone's mayor, Vincenzo Voce, gave honorary citizenship of the city to Nwankwo's son on 27 March 2021.

== Career statistics ==
=== Club ===
As of match played 21 December 2024

Appearances and goals by club, season and competition
Club	Season	League			National cup (Note: Includes Taça de Portugal, Coppa Italia)		League cup (Note: Includes Taça da Liga)		Total	
Club	Season	Division	Apps	Goals	Apps	Goals	Apps	Goals	Apps	Goals
Portimonense	2011–12	LigaPro	23	5	2	0	6	1	31	6
Portimonense	2012–13	LigaPro	32	12	2	1	3	0	37	13
Portimonense	Total		55	17	4	1	9	1	68	19
Gil Vicente	2013–14	Primeira Liga	15	0	1	0	5	0	21	0
Gil Vicente	2014–15	Primeira Liga	30	9	3	1	2	1	35	11
Gil Vicente	2015–16	LigaPro	43	20	3	0	0	0	46	20
Gil Vicente	Total		88	29	7	1	7	1	102	31
Crotone	2016–17	Serie A	21	3	1	1	—		22	4
Crotone	2017–18	Serie A	23	7	1	0	—		24	7
Crotone	2018–19	Serie B	33	14	3	0	—		36	14
Crotone	2019–20	Serie B	37	20	1	1	—		38	21
Crotone	2020–21	Serie A	38	20	1	0	—		39	20
Crotone	Total		152	64	7	2	—		159	66
Salernitana (loan)	2021–22	Serie A	19	1	1	0	—		20	1
Parma (loan)	2021–22	Serie B	12	1	0	0	—		12	1
Benevento (loan)	2022–23	Serie B	22	0	0	0	—		22	0
Salernitana	2023–24	Serie A	15	3	2	0	—		17	3
Salernitana	2024–25	Serie B	21	4	2	1	—		23	5
Salernitana	Total		36	7	4	1	—		40	8
Career total			384	119	23	5	16	2	423	126

=== International ===
As of match played 26 June 2018

Appearances and goals by national team and year
National team	Year	Apps	Goals
Nigeria	2018	4	0
Total		4	0
