= Niccolò Zanellato =

Italian footballer

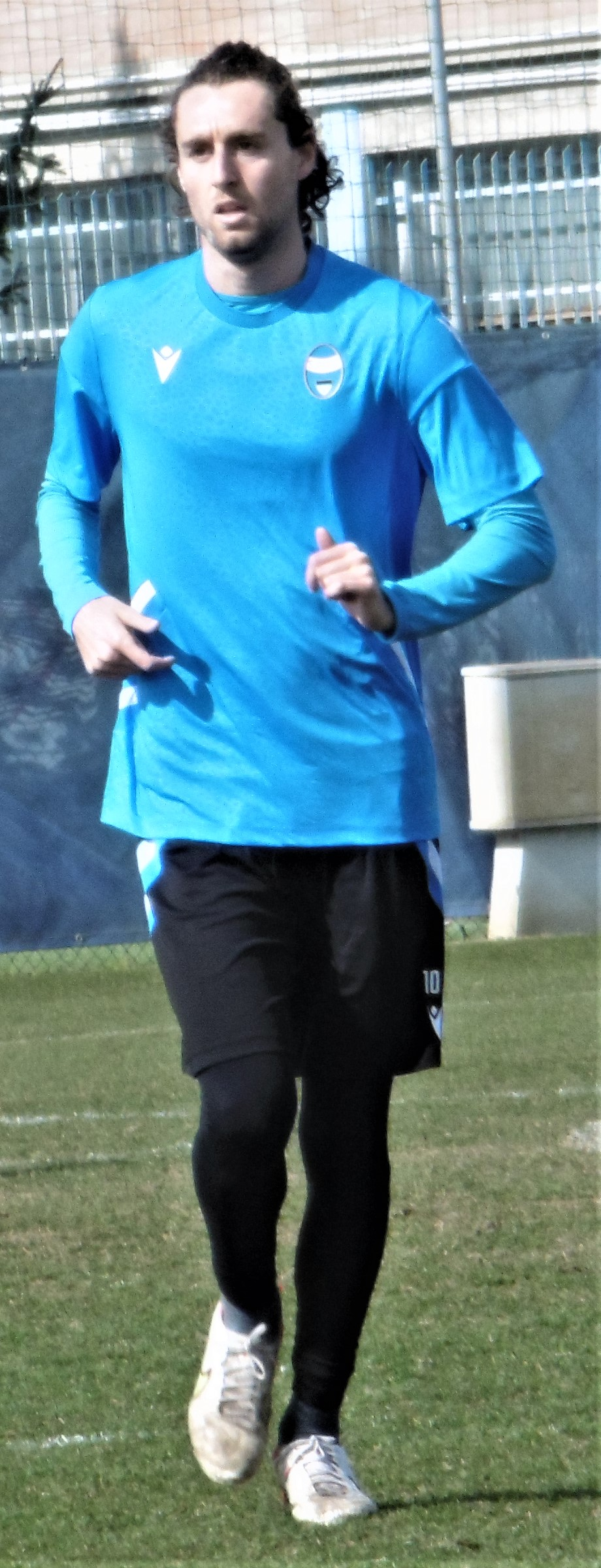

Personal information
- Date of birth: 24 June 1998 (age 28)
- Place of birth: Milan, Italy
- Height: 1.95 m (6 ft 5 in)
- Position: Midfielder

Team information
- Current team: Casarano
- Number: 21

Youth career
- AC Milan

Senior career*
Years	Team	Apps	(Gls)
2017–2018	AC Milan	1	(0)
2018	→ Crotone (loan)	1	(0)
2018–2022	Crotone	78	(6)
2022–2023	SPAL	45	(0)
2023–2025	Catania	13	(0)
2024	→ Crotone (loan)	13	(1)
2025–2026	Lecco	44	(5)
2026–	Casarano	1	(0)

International career^{‡}
2019–2020	Italy U21	6	(1)
- * Club domestic league appearances and goals as of 21 August 2026 ‡ National team caps and goals as of 8 September 2020

Niccoló Zanellato (born 24 June 1998) is an Italian footballer who plays as a midfielder for Serie C Group C club Casarano.

== Club career ==
Zanellato is a Milan's youth academy graduate. He received his first-ever call-up to the senior team from the head coach Vincenzo Montella ahead of the away Serie A game against Cagliari played on 28 May 2017; he, however, remained an unused substitute. He made his UEFA Europa League debut on 24 August 2017 against KF Shkëndija, playing the entire game as Milan won 1–0.

On 30 January 2018, he was signed by Crotone on a six-months loan with an obligation to buy.

On 29 January 2022, he signed with SPAL until 30 June 2024.

On 1 February 2024, Zanellato returned to Crotone on loan.

== International career ==
He made his debut with the Italy U21 on 6 September 2019, in a friendly match won 4–0 against Moldova.

== Career statistics ==
As of match played 14 January 2023

Appearances and goals by club, season and competition
Club	Season	League			National Cup		Continental		Other		Total	
Club	Season	Division	Apps	Goals	Apps	Goals	Apps	Goals	Apps	Goals	Apps	Goals
Milan	2017–18	Serie A	0	0	0	0	2 (Note: All appearances in Europa League)	0	—		2	0
Crotone (loan)	2017–18	Serie A	1	0	0	0	—		—		1	0
Crotone	2018–19	Serie B	18	2	2	0	—		—		20	2
Crotone	2019–20	Serie B	19	2	2	0	—		—		21	2
Crotone	2020–21	Serie A	27	1	0	0	—		—		27	1
Crotone	2021–22	Serie B	14	1	2	0	—		—		16	1
Crotone	Total		79	6	6	0	0	0	0	0	85	6
SPAL	2021–22	Serie B	17	0	0	0	—		—		17	0
SPAL	2022–23	Serie B	15	0	2	0	—		—		17	0
SPAL	Total		32	0	2	0	0	0	0	0	34	0
Career total			111	6	8	0	2	0	0	0	121	6
