= Junior Messias =

Brazilian footballer (born 1991)

Júnior Messias
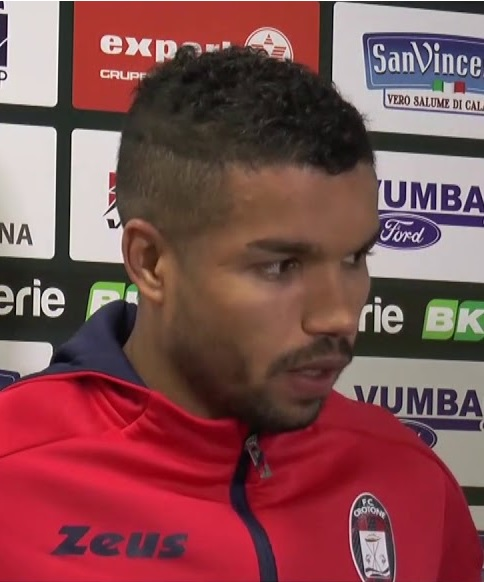
- Messias with Crotone in 2020

Personal information
- Full name: Walter Messias de Gualheiros Júnior
- Date of birth: 13 May 1991 (age 35)
- Place of birth: Belo Horizonte, Brazil
- Height: 1.74 m (5 ft 9 in)
- Position: Forward

Team information
- Current team: Genoa
- Number: 10

Youth career
- 2008–2011: Cruzeiro

Senior career*
Years	Team	Apps	(Gls)
2015–2016	Casale	32	(21)
2016–2017	Chieri	33	(14)
2017–2019	Gozzano	51	(8)
2019–2022	Crotone	70	(15)
2021–2022	→ AC Milan (loan)	26	(5)
2022–2024	AC Milan	25	(5)
2023–2024	→ Genoa (loan)	9	(1)
2024–	Genoa	52	(5)
- * Club domestic league appearances and goals as of 16:33, 12 October 2026 (UTC)

Walter Messias de Gualheiros Júnior (born 13 May 1991) is a Brazilian professional footballer who plays as a forward for Serie A club Genoa. Capable of playing anywhere across the attacking front, he has also been deployed on occasions as an attacking midfielder.

== Club career ==
=== Early career ===
Messias started his senior career in the lower-tier, non-professional Italian divisions, being discovered by former Torino player and manager Ezio Rossi, who persuaded him to join Casale in 2015.

At the end of the 2017–18 season his team Gozzano was promoted to Serie C. He made his professional Serie C debut for Gozzano on 23 September 2018 in a game against Cuneo, starting the game and played the whole match. He scored his first professional-level goal on 26 September 2018, against Piacenza.

=== Crotone ===
On 31 January 2019, Messias' rights were sold to Serie B club Crotone, who loaned him back to Gozzano until the end of the 2018–19 season. He finished his first professional-level season with 33 appearances (32 as a starter) and four goals. Messias made his Serie B debut for Crotone on 24 August 2019 in a game against Cosenza, starting the game and played the whole match. He was instrumental in Crotone's promotion to the Italian top flight (the second in the club history) by scoring six goals throughout the season, and was confirmed as part of the team squad for the 2020–21 Serie A campaign.

He scored his first Serie A goal on 25 October 2020 against Cagliari, followed by two braces in December against Spezia and Parma.

=== AC Milan ===
On 31 August 2021, Messias joined AC Milan on a one-year loan deal with an option to buy. He made his debut for the club on 3 October 2021, coming on as a substitute in a 3–2 win over Atalanta. On 24 November, he scored his first goal for Milan on his UEFA Champions League debut; he scored the only goal of a 1–0 group stage win over Atlético Madrid. Messias described his header as "the most important moment of [his] career". On 1 December 2021, he received his first league start scoring a brace in a 3–0 away win for Milan against Genoa.

On 6 January 2022, against Roma, he scored the second goal in eventual 3–1 win. On 17 January against Spezia, Messias last minute goal and potentially the winner was controversially disallowed by the referee due to a beforehand foul on his teammate, Ante Rebic, Spezia went on to score the second and win 2–1, the referee apologized to Milan players for the incident. On 19 February, he scored the opener against Salernitana in 2–2 draw. On 15 April, he scored against Genoa again to seal 2–0 win. On 15 May he provided the assist to Leao against Atalanta in the first goal as Milan won 2–0, One week later Milan was crowned The Scudetto title after 11-year absence. Overall Messias' contribution in the campaign was 5 goals and 2 assists in 26 matches.

On 7 July, Milan bought him, despite the option to buy having already expired.

=== Genoa ===
On 11 August 2023, Messias joined recently promoted Serie A club Genoa on a season-long loan with the option to make the deal permanent, which becomes an obligation if certain conditions are met. On 13 January 2024, Genoa CFC paid the clause to AC Milan, totalling 3 million euros and with Messias permanently moving to the club.

In the current season, Messias scored against Fiorentina and provided an assist and scored in a victory against Lecce.

== Personal life ==
A Brazilian by birth, Messias moved to Italy in 2011 together with his wife and son, joining his brother in Turin, where he started working in the delivery sector and playing football for an amateur team of the local Peruvian community in his free time.

== Career statistics ==
As of match played 10 October 2026

Appearances and goals by club, season and competition
Club	Season	League			Coppa Italia		Europe		Other		Total	
Club	Season	Division	Apps	Goals	Apps	Goals	Apps	Goals	Apps	Goals	Apps	Goals
Casale	2015–16	Eccellenza	32	21	—		—		—		32	21
Chieri	2016–17	Serie D	33	14	—		—		1 (Note: Appearance in Coppa Italia Serie D)	1	34	15
Gozzano	2017–18	Serie D	19	4	—		—		4 (Note: One appearance in Coppa Italia Serie D, three appearances and one goal in Serie D play-offs)	1	23	5
Gozzano	2018–19	Serie C	32	4	—		—		3 (Note: Appearances in Coppa Italia Serie C)	1	35	5
Gozzano	Total		51	8	—		—		7	2	58	10
Crotone	2019–20	Serie B	34	6	2	0	—		—		36	6
Crotone	2020–21	Serie A	36	9	1	0	—		—		37	9
Crotone	Total		70	15	3	0	—		—		73	15
AC Milan (loan)	2021–22	Serie A	26	5	4	0	2 (Note: Appearances in UEFA Champions League)	1	—		32	6
AC Milan	2022–23	Serie A	25	5	1	0	9	1	1 (Note: Appearance in Supercoppa Italiana)	0	36	6
AC Milan	Total		51	10	5	0	11	2	1	0	68	12
Genoa	2023–24 (Note: Part of this season was spent on loan from AC Milan)	Serie A	18	1	0	0	—		—		18	1
Genoa	2024–25	Serie A	17	1	1	1	—		—		18	2
Genoa	2025–26	Serie A	20	3	2	0	—		—		22	3
Genoa	2026–27	Serie A	6	1	1	0	—		—		7	1
Genoa	Total		61	6	4	1	—		—		65	7
Career total			298	73	12	1	11	2	9	3	330	79

== Honours ==
AC Milan

- Serie A: 2021–22
