= Marco Spina =

Italian footballer

Personal information
- Date of birth: 25 January 2000 (age 26)
- Place of birth: Mileto, Italy
- Height: 1.81 m (5 ft 11 in)
- Position: Midfielder

Team information
- Current team: Gubbio
- Number: 7

Youth career
- –2015: Reggina
- 2015–2018: Virtus Entella
- 2018–2019: SPAL

Senior career*
Years	Team	Apps	(Gls)
2019–2020	SPAL	0	(0)
2019–2020	→ Gozzano (loan)	21	(0)
2020–2021	Vibonese	24	(3)
2021–2025	Crotone	16	(0)
2021–2022	→ Vibonese (loan)	24	(2)
2022–2024	→ Gubbio (loan)	68	(10)
2025–	Gubbio	24	(1)
2026	→ Pineto (loan)	2	(0)
- * Club domestic league appearances and goals as of 22 August 2026

Marco Spina (born 25 January 2000) is an Italian professional footballer who plays as a right winger for Serie C Group B club Gubbio.

== Club career ==
=== SPAL ===
He was called up to the senior squad of SPAL several times during the 2018–19 Serie A season, but did not make any appearances.

==== Loan to Gozzano ====
On 23 July 2019 he joined Serie C club Gozzano on loan. On 25 August he made his professional Serie C debut for Gozzano as a 58th-minute substitute replacing Martín Rolle in a 2–2 away draw against Alessandria. He first appeared in the starting lineup on 21 September in a 2–1 away win over Pro Vercelli, he was replaced Giovanni Bruzzaniti after 53 minutes.

=== Vibonese ===
On 1 September 2020 he signed with Vibonese.

=== Crotone ===
On 31 August 2021, he signed with Serie B club Crotone and was loaned back to Vibonese for the 2021–22 season. On 26 July 2022, Spina was loaned by Gubbio. On 25 August 2023, the loan to Gubbio was renewed for the 2023–24 season.

=== Gubbio ===
On 24 January 2025, Spina returned to Gubbio on a permanent basis.

== Career statistics ==
=== Club ===
As of 3 October 2019

Club	Season	League			Cup		Europe		Other		Total	
Club	Season	League	Apps	Goals	Apps	Goals	Apps	Goals	Apps	Goals	Apps	Goals
Gozzano (loan)	2019–20	Serie C	7	0	0	0	—		—		7	0
Career total			7	0	0	0	—		—		7	0
