= Manuel Nicoletti =

Italian footballer (born 1998)

Personal information
- Date of birth: 9 December 1998 (age 27)
- Place of birth: Catanzaro, Italy
- Height: 1.80 m (5 ft 11 in)
- Positions: Left back; left midfielder

Team information
- Current team: Ascoli
- Number: 3

Youth career
- 2007–2014: Catanzaro
- 2014: Crotone

Senior career*
Years	Team	Apps	(Gls)
2014–2018	Crotone	1	(0)
2017–2018	→ Catanzaro (loan)	21	(0)
2018–2020	Catanzaro	44	(1)
2020–2021	Monopoli	0	(0)
2021–2022	Foggia	16	(2)
2022–2024	Crotone	2	(0)
2022–2023	→ Reggiana (loan)	5	(0)
2024	→ Casertana (loan)	5	(0)
2024–2025	Picerno	14	(1)
2025–	Ascoli	26	(1)

International career
2014	Italy U16	3	(0)
2014	Italy U17	8	(1)
2015–2016	Italy U18	4	(0)
- * Club domestic league appearances and goals as of 30 April 2026

Manuel Nicoletti (born 9 December 1998) is an Italian footballer who plays for Serie B club Ascoli as a left back or left midfielder.

== Career ==
Nicoletti is a youth exponent from Crotone. He made his Serie B debut on 29 November 2014 against Modena. He replaced Bruno Martella after 90 minutes.

He signed with Catanzaro on a permanent basis on 20 July 2018 after spending the 2017–18 season on loan with the club.

On 21 September 2020, he joined Monopoli on a two-year contract.

On 3 August 2021, he signed a two-year contract for Foggia.

On 31 January 2022, Nicoletti signed a contract with Crotone until 30 June 2024. On 31 August 2022, he moved on loan to Reggiana, with an option to buy. On 19 January 2024, Nicoletti was loaned to Casertana.

On 28 August 2024, Nicoletti moved to Picerno.

On 14 July 2025, Nicoletti joined Ascoli.
