= Pasquale Giannotti =

Italian footballer

Personal information
- Date of birth: 5 June 1999 (age 27)
- Place of birth: Cirò Marina, Italy
- Height: 1.70 m (5 ft 7 in)
- Position: Midfielder

Team information
- Current team: Guidonia Montecelio
- Number: 20

Youth career
- –2018: Crotone

Senior career*
Years	Team	Apps	(Gls)
2018–2024	Crotone	42	(0)
2018–2020	→ Rende (loan)	44	(2)
2020–2021	→ Virtus Francavilla (loan)	27	(0)
2023	→ Monopoli (loan)	13	(2)
2024–2026	Trento	73	(12)
2026–	Guidonia Montecelio	1	(0)
- * Club domestic league appearances and goals as of 22 August 2026

Pasquale Giannotti (born 5 June 1999) is an Italian professional footballer who plays as a midfielder for Serie C Group B club Guidonia Montecelio.

== Club career ==
=== Crotone ===
He is the product of Crotone youth teams and played for their Under-19 squad beginning in the 2014–15 season. He made a handful of bench appearances for Crotone's senior squad in the 2017–18 Serie A season, but did not see any playing time.

==== Loan to Rende ====
On 17 August 2018, he joined Serie C club Rende on a season-long loan. He made his Serie C debut for Rende in their season opener on 16 September 2018 against Paganese, as a starter.

==== Loan to Virtus Francavilla ====
On 20 August 2020 he moved on loan to Virtus Francavilla.

==== Return from loans ====
Upon his return from loan, he started appearing for Crotone in the 2021–22 Serie B season.

==== Loan to Monopoli ====
On 3 January 2023, Giannotti was loaned to Monopoli.
