= Giovanni Bruzzaniti =

Italian footballer (born 2000)

Personal information
- Date of birth: 9 September 2000 (age 26)
- Place of birth: Melito di Porto Salvo, Italy
- Height: 1.80 m (5 ft 11 in)
- Position: Winger

Team information
- Current team: Catania
- Number: 7

Youth career
- –2017: Novara
- 2017–2018: Gozzano

Senior career*
Years	Team	Apps	(Gls)
2018–2020	Gozzano	20	(3)
2020–2025	Crotone	20	(1)
2020–2021	→ Pro Vercelli (loan)	6	(0)
2021–2022	→ Pro Vercelli (loan)	32	(1)
2022–2023	→ Lucchese (loan)	35	(5)
2024–2025	→ Pineto (loan)	36	(15)
2025–2026	Pineto	17	(9)
2026–	Catania	18	(2)
- * Club domestic league appearances and goals as of 1 May 2026

Giovanni Bruzzaniti (born 9 September 2000) is an Italian professional footballer who plays as a winger for Serie C Group C club Catania.

== Club career ==
Bruzzaniti started his senior career in Serie C club Gozzano.

In 2020, he joined Crotone, and was sent on loan to Pro Vercelli. On 1 September 2022, Bruzzaniti was loaned by Lucchese.
