= Gianluca =

- Pronunciation: Italian: [dʒanˈluːka]
- Gender: Male

Origin
- Origin: Italy

Other names
- Related names: John, Luke

Gianluca is an Italian masculine given name. Its English translation is "John Luke" and it is often a shorter form of "Giovanni Luca". Notable people with the name include:

- Gianluca Alfenoni (born 1996), Argentine footballer
- Gianluca Arrighi (born 1972), Italian writer
- Gianluca Attanasio (born 1979), Italian singer-songwriter, composer, and film director
- Gianluca Atzori (born 1971), Italian footballer and manager
- Gianluca Bacchiocchi (born 1987), Italian footballer
- Gianluca Barattolo (born 1978), Italian rowing coxswain
- Gianluca Barba (born 1995), Italian footballer
- Gianluca Barilari (born 1964), Swiss basketball coach
- Gianluca Basile (born 1975), Italian basketball player
- Gianluca Berti (born 1967), Italian footballer
- Gianluca Bezzina (born 1989), Maltese singer and doctor, also known by the mononym Gianluca
- Gianluca Bocchi (born 1954), Italian philosopher
- Gianluca Bollini (born 1980), Sammarinese footballer
- Gianluca Bortolami (born 1968), Italian road cyclist
- Gianluca Brambilla (born 1987), Italian road bicycle racer
- Gianluca Branco (born 1970), Italian boxer
- Gianluca Buonanno (1966–2016), Italian politician
- Gianluca Busato (born 1969), Italian entrepreneur, engineer, activist, and politician
- Gianluca Busio (born 2002), American soccer player
- Gianluca Caprari (born 1993), Italian footballer
- Gianluca Carpani (born 1993), Italian footballer
- Gianluca Cascioli (born 1979), Italian pianist, conductor, and composer
- Gianluca Castellini (fl. 15th-century), Italian Roman Catholic prelate and bishop
- Gianluca Catalano (born 2000), Canadian soccer player
- Gianluca Cherubini (1974–2026), Italian footballer
- Gianluca Cologna (born 1990), Swiss cross-country skier
- Gianluca Comotto (born 1978), Italian footballer
- Gianluca Conte (born 1972), Italian footballer, manager, and analyzer
- Gianluca Costantini (born 1971), Italian cartoonist, artist, and activist
- Gianluca Crisafi (born 1974), Italian voice actor
- Gianluca Cuomo (born 1993), American soccer player
- Gianluca Curci (born 1985), Italian footballer
- Gianluca D'Angelo (born 1991), Swiss footballer
- Gianluca De Angelis (born 1967), Italian footballer
- Gianluca De Angelis (born 1981), Italian footballer
- Gianluca De Lorenzi (born 1972), Italian auto racing driver and team owner
- Gianluca De Ponti (born 1952), Italian footballer
- Gianluca Di Chiara (born 1993), Italian footballer
- Gianluca Di Giulio (born 1972), Italian footballer
- Gianluca Faliva (born 1973), Italian rugby player
- Gianluca Falsini (born 1975), Italian footballer and manager
- Gianluca Farina (born 1962), Italian rower
- Gianluca Ferrari (born 1997), Argentine footballer
- Gianluca Festa (born 1959), Italian footballer
- Gianluca Festa (politician) (born 1974), Italian politician
- Gianluca Firmo (born 1973), Italian singer and musician
- Gianluca Floris (born 1964), Italian writer and belcanto singer
- Gianluca Forcolin (born 1968), Italian politician
- Gianluca Frabotta (born 1999), Italian footballer
- Gianluca Francesconi (born 1971), Italian footballer
- Gianluca Franciosi (born 1991), Italian footballer
- Gianluca Frontino (born 1989), Swiss footballer
- Gianluca Freddi (born 1989), Italian footballer
- Gianluca Gaetano (born 2000), Italian footballer
- Gianluca Galasso (born 1984), Italian footballer
- Gianluca Galimberti (born 1968), Italian professor and politician
- Gianluca Gaudenzi (born 1965), Italian footballer and coach
- Gianluca Gaudino (born 1996), German footballer
- Gianluca Gazzoli (born 1988), Italian radio personality, television presenter and YouTuber
- Gianluca Ginoble (born 1995), Italian baritone of the boyband Il Volo
- Gianluca Giovannini (born 1983), Italian footballer
- Gianluca Gorini (born 1970), Italian racing cyclist
- Gianluca Gracco (born 1990), Italian footballer
- Gianluca Grassadonia (born 1972), Italian footballer and coach
- Gianluca Grava (born 1977), Italian footballer
- Gianluca Grignani (born 1972), Italian singer
- Gianluca Guidi (born 1968), Italian rugby player and coach
- Gianluca Havern (born 1988), English footballer
- Gianluca Hossmann (born 1991), Swiss footballer
- Gianluca Iacono (born 1970), Italian voice actor
- Gian-Luca Itter (born 1999), German footballer
- Gianluca Korte (born 1990), German footballer
- Gianluca Lapadula (born 1990), Italian footballer
- Gianluca Litteri (born 1988), Italian footballer
- Gianluca Luisi (born 1970), Italian pianist
- Gianluca Luppi (born 1966), Italian footballer and coach
- Gianluca Mager (born 1994), Italian tennis player
- Gianluca Maggiore (born 1985), Italian racing cyclist
- Gianluca Maglia (born 1988), Italian swimmer
- Gianluca Mancini (born 1996), Italian footballer
- Gianluca Mancuso (born 1998), Argentine footballer
- Gianluca Marchetti (born 1993), Italian basketball player
- Gianluca Maria (born 1992), Curaçaoan footballer
- Gianluca Marzullo (born 1991), Italian footballer
- Gianluca Masi (born 1972), Italian astrophysicist and astronomer
- Gianluca Musacci (born 1987), Italian footballer
- Gianluca Nani (born 1962), Italian football director
- Gianluca Nannelli (born 1973), Italian motorcycle racer
- Gianluca Naso (born 1987), Italian tennis player
- Gianluca Nicco (born 1988), Italian footballer
- Gianluca Nijholt (born 1990), Dutch professional footballer
- Gianluca Pagliuca (born 1966), Italian footballer and coach
- Gianluca Pandeynuwu (born 1997), Indonesian footballer
- Gianluca Paparesta (born 1969), Italian football referee
- Gianluca Pegolo (born 1981), Italian footballer
- Gianluca Pessotto (born 1970), Italian footballer
- Gianluca Petrachi (born 1969), Italian footballer
- Gianluca Petrella (born 1975), Italian jazz trombonist
- Gianluca Pianegonda (born 1968), Italian racing cyclist
- Gianluca Piccoli (born 1997), Italian footballer
- Gianluca Pierobon (born 1967), Italian racing cyclist
- Gianluca Pollace (born 1995), Italian football player
- Gianluca Pozzi (born 1965), Italian tennis player
- Gianluca Prestianni (born 2006), Argentine footballer
- Gianluca Pugliese (born 1997), Argentine footballer
- Gianluca Ramazzotti (born 1970), Italian actor
- Gianluca Rinaldini (born 1959), Italian tennis player
- Gianluca Rocchi (born 1973), Italian football referee
- Gianluca Sampietro (born 1993), Italian footballer
- Gianluca Sansone (born 1987), Italian footballer
- Gianluca Savoldi (born 1975), Italian footballer
- Gianluca Scamacca (born 1999), Italian footballer
- Gianluca Segarelli (born 1978), Italian footballer
- Gianluca Signorini (1960–2002), Italian footballer
- Gianluca Simeone (born 1998), Argentine footballer
- Gianluca Sironi (born 1974), Italian cyclist
- Gianluca Sordo (born 1969), Italian footballer
- Gianluca Spinelli (born 1966), Italian football goalkeeper coach
- Gianluca Susta (born 1956), Italian politician
- Gianluca Maria Tavarelli (born 1964), Italian film director and screenwriter
- Gianluca Temelin (born 1976), Italian footballer
- Gianluca Testa (born 1982), Italian actor and director
- Gianluca Tiberti (born 1967), Italian modern pentathlete
- Gianluca Tognon (born 1976), Italian food scientist, researcher, public health expert, and speaker
- Gianluca Toscano (born 1984), Italian footballer
- Gianluca Triuzzi (born 1978), Italian footballer
- Gianluca Turchetta (born 1991), Italian footballer
- Gianluca Valoti (born 1973), Italian road racing cyclist
- Gianluca Vialli (1964–2023), Italian footballer
- Gianluca Vivan (born 1983), Italian footballer
- Gianluca Vizziello (born 1980), Italian motorcycle racer
- Gianluca Zambrotta (born 1977), Italian footballer
- Gianluca Zanetti (born 1977), Italian footballer
- Gianluca Zavarise (born 1986), Canadian soccer player

== See also ==
- Giovanni (name)
- Luca (masculine given name)
