= 2023–24 US Livorno 1915 season =

US Livorno 1915
2023–24 season
- Manager: Fabio Fossati (until 8 April); Niccolò Pascali (from 8 April)
- Stadium: Stadio Armando Picchi
- Serie D Group E: 4th
- Promotion play-off: Semi-final
- Coppa Italia Serie D: Round of 16
- Top goalscorer: League: Giordani Giulio (7); All: Alessandro Cesarini; Giordani Giulio (8)

The 2023–24 season was US Livorno 1915's 109th season in existence and second consecutive season in the Serie D following their descent from the third tier in 2021. They also competed in the Coppa Italia Serie D.

== Players ==
=== First-team squad ===
As of 26 January 2023

Note: Flags indicate national team as defined under FIFA eligibility rules; some limited exceptions apply. Players may hold more than one non-FIFA nationality.

| No. | Pos. | Nation | Player |
|---|---|---|---|
| 1 | GK | ITA | Gabriele Fogli |
| 2 | DF | ITA | Cesare Ivani |
| 3 | DF | ITA | Andrea Fancelli |
| 4 | MF | ITA | Federico Apolloni |
| 5 | DF | ITA | Elia Gampà |
| 6 | DF | ITA | Matteo Bontempi |
| 8 | MF | ITA | Andrea Luci |
| 12 | GK | ITA | Giorgio Bettarini |
| 14 | MF | ITA | Gian Marco Neri |
| 16 | MF | ITA | Mattia Lucarelli |
| 17 | MF | ITA | Jacopo Giuliani |
| 18 | FW | ITA | Matteo Frati |
| 19 | DF | ITA | Alessandro Zanolla |
| 20 | FW | FRA | Faissal El Bakhtaoui |

| No. | Pos. | Nation | Player |
|---|---|---|---|
| 21 | FW | ITA | Francesco Neri |
| 23 | MF | ITA | Cristian Belli |
| 24 | MF | ITA | Lorenzo Pecchia |
| 26 | MF | ITA | Simone Greselin |
| 27 | MF | ITA | Gabriele Mazzucca |
| 29 | DF | ITA | Michele Russo |
| 33 | DF | ITA | Francesco Karkalis |
| 68 | MF | ITA | Michele Bruzzo |
| 89 | DF | ITA | Maikol Benassi |
| 92 | FW | ITA | Giacomo Lucatti |
| 97 | GK | ITA | Fabrizio Bagheria (on loan from Inter Milan) |
| 98 | FW | ITA | Simone Lo Faso |
| — | FW | ITA | Stefano Longo (on loan from Lecco) |

== Transfers ==
=== In ===
| Pos. | Player | Transferred from | Fee | Date | Source |

=== Out ===
| Pos. | Player | Transferred to | Fee | Date | Source |

== Pre-season and friendlies ==
Win Draw Loss Fixtures

| 6 August 2023 Friendly | Livorno (Italy) | 1–1 | (Italy) Ghiviborgo | Pievepelago |
| --:-- CEST (UTC+2) | Bartolini 8' | | Campani 44' | Attendance: ≈400 |

| 21 August 2023 Friendly | Livorno (Italy) | 1–3 | (Italy) Pontedera | Livorno |
| --:-- CEST (UTC+2) | | | | Stadium: Stadio Armando Picchi; Referee: Lorenzo |

== Competitions ==
=== Overall record ===
| Competition | First match | Last match | Starting round | Final position | Record | | | | | | | |
| Competition | First match | Last match | Starting round | Final position | Pld | W | D | L | GF | GA | GD | Win % |
|---|---|---|---|---|---|---|---|---|---|---|---|---|
| Serie D | 10 September 2023 | 5 May 2024 | Matchday 1 | 4th | 34 | 16 | 11 | 7 | 49 | 32 | +17 | 47.06 |
| Promotion play-off | 12 May 2024 | | Semi-final | Semi-final | 1 | 0 | 0 | 1 | 2 | 3 | −1 | 0.00 |
| Coppa Italia Serie D | 2 September 2023 | 29 November 2023 | First round | Round of 16 | 4 | 2 | 1 | 1 | 6 | 5 | +1 | 50.00 |
| Total | | | | | 39 | 18 | 12 | 9 | 57 | 40 | +17 | 46.15 |

Source: Soccerway

=== Serie D ===
==== League table ====
| Pos | Team | Pld | W | D | L | GF | GA | GD | Pts | Promotion, qualification or relegation |
|---|---|---|---|---|---|---|---|---|---|---|
| 2 | Follonica Gavorrano | 34 | 18 | 11 | 5 | 44 | 25 | +19 | 65 | Qualification for promotion play-offs (Note: Winning play-offs does not grant promotion to Serie C, but a chance to get readmitted in case of vacancies.) |
| 3 | Grosseto (O) | 34 | 16 | 15 | 3 | 53 | 33 | +20 | 63 | Qualification for promotion play-offs |
| 4 | Livorno | 34 | 16 | 11 | 7 | 49 | 32 | +17 | 59 | Qualification for promotion play-offs |
| 5 | Tau Calcio Altopascio | 34 | 15 | 13 | 6 | 55 | 31 | +24 | 58 | Qualification for promotion play-offs |
| 6 | Seravezza Pozzi | 34 | 17 | 6 | 11 | 49 | 40 | +9 | 57 | |

Updated to match(es) played on 5 May 2024. Source:
Rules for classification: (Note: 1) Points; 2) Head-to-head points; 3) Head-to-head goal difference; 4) Goal difference; 5) Goals scored; 6) Draw.)
(O) Play-off winners

==== Results summary ====
| Overall | | | | | | | | Home | | | | | | Away | | | | | |
| Pld | W | D | L | GF | GA | GD | Pts | W | D | L | GF | GA | GD | W | D | L | GF | GA | GD |
|---|---|---|---|---|---|---|---|---|---|---|---|---|---|---|---|---|---|---|---|
| 34 | 16 | 11 | 7 | 49 | 32 | +17 | 59 | 8 | 6 | 3 | 26 | 17 | +9 | 8 | 5 | 4 | 23 | 15 | +8 |

Source: Worldfootball

==== Results by round ====
| Round | 1 | 2 | 3 | 4 | 5 | 6 | 7 | 8 | 9 | 10 | 11 | 12 | 13 | 14 | 15 | 16 | 17 | 18 | 19 | 20 | 21 | 22 | 23 | 24 | 25 | 26 | 27 | 28 | 29 | 30 | 31 | 32 | 33 | 34 |
|---|---|---|---|---|---|---|---|---|---|---|---|---|---|---|---|---|---|---|---|---|---|---|---|---|---|---|---|---|---|---|---|---|---|---|
| Ground | A | H | A | H | A | H | A | H | A | H | A | H | A | H | A | A | H | H | A | H | A | H | A | H | A | H | A | H | A | H | A | H | H | A |
| Result | W | D | W | W | W | L | W | L | D | D | W | W | W | D | D | L | W | L | D | D | D | W | W | W | W | D | L | W | D | D | L | W | W | L |
| Position | 3 | 4 | 2 | 1 | 1 | 3 | 2 | 3 | 6 | 6 | 5 | 4 | 3 | 4 | 4 | 6 | 5 | 6 | 6 | 6 | 6 | 5 | 2 | 2 | 2 | 3 | 4 | 3 | 3 | 4 | 5 | 5 | 4 | 4 |

Source: Worldfootball
A = Away; H = Home; W = Win; D = Draw; L = Loss

==== Matches ====
| 10 September 2023 1 | Poggibonsi | 1–4 | Livorno | Poggibonsi |
| 15:00 CEST (UTC+2) | Motti 23' | | Giordani 11'; Nardi 13'; Cesarini 30' (pen.); Mutton 63' | Stadium: Stadio Stefano Lotti |

| 17 September 2023 2 | Livorno | 1–1 | Grosseto | Livorno |
| 15:00 CEST (UTC+2) | Ronchi 90+6' | | Sabelli 8' | Stadium: Stadio Armando Picchi; Referee: Cerea |

| 23 September 2023 3 | Ponsacco | 1–3 | Livorno | Ponsacco |
| 15:00 CEST (UTC+2) | Panattoni 17' | | Cesarini 33'; Cori 42'; Bellini 83' | Stadium: Stadio Comunale |

| 1 October 2023 4 | Livorno | 3–1 | Sansepolcro | Livorno |
| | | | | Stadium: Stadio Armando Picchi |

| 8 October 2023 5 | Ghivizzano | 0–1 | Livorno | Coreglia Antelminelli |
| 15:00 | | | | Stadium: Stadio Comunale Carraia |

| 15 October 2023 6 | Livorno | 2–4 | Tau Calcio | Livorno |
| | | | | Stadium: Stadio Armando Picchi |

| 22 October 2023 7 | Real Forte Querceta | 0–1 | Livorno | Forte dei Marmi |
| 15:00 | | | | Stadium: Stadio Comunale Carlo Necchi |

| 29 October 2023 8 | Livorno | 0–1 | Seravezza | Livorno |
| | | | | Stadium: Stadio Armando Picchi |

| 5 November 2023 10 | Livorno | 1–1 | Follonica Gavorrano | Livorno |
| | | | | Stadium: Stadio Armando Picchi |

| 12 November 2023 11 | San Donato Tavarnelle | 1–2 | Livorno | San Donato |
| 14:30 CET (UTC+1) |

| 15 November 2023 9 | Pianese | 1–1 | Livorno | Piancastagnaio |
| 14:30 CET (UTC+1) |

| 19 November 2023 12 | Livorno | 3–1 | Cenaia | Livorno |
| 14:30 CET (UTC+1) | | | | Stadium: Stadio Armando Picchi |

| 26 November 2023 13 | Montevarchi | 0–2 | Livorno | Montevarchi |
| 14:30 CET (UTC+1) | | | | Stadium: Stadio Gastone Brilli Peri |

| 3 December 2023 14 | Livorno | 1–1 | Figline | Livorno |
| 14:30 CET (UTC+1) | | | | Stadium: Stadio Armando Picchi |

| 10 December 2023 15 | Sangiovannese | 1–1 | Livorno | San Giovanni Valdarno |
| 14:30 CET (UTC+1) | | | | Stadium: Stadio Virgilio Fedini |

| 17 December 2023 16 | Trestina | 1–0 | Livorno | Città di Castello |
| 14:30 CET (UTC+1) | | | | Stadium: Lorenzo Casini |

| 20 December 2023 17 | Livorno | 1–0 | Orvietana | Livorno |
| 14:30 CET (UTC+1) | | | | Stadium: Stadio Armando Picchi |

| 7 January 2024 18 | Livorno | 0–1 | Poggibonsi | Livorno |
| | | | | Stadium: Stadio Armando Picchi |

| 14 January 2024 19 | Grosseto | 1–1 | Livorno | Grosseto |
| | | | | Stadium: Stadio Olimpico Carlo Zecchini |

| 21 January 2024 20 | Livorno | 1–1 | Mobilieri Ponsacco | Livorno |
| | | | | Stadium: Stadio Armando Picchi |

| 28 January 2024 21 | Sansepolcro | 1–1 | Livorno |

| 4 February 2024 22 | Livorno | 4–1 | Ghivizzano | Livorno |
| | | | | Stadium: Stadio Armando Picchi |

| 17 February 2024 23 | Tau Calcio | 1–2 | Livorno |

| 25 February 2024 24 | Livorno | 2–1 | Real Forte Querceta | Livorno |
| 14:30 | | | | Stadium: Stadio Armando Picchi |

| 3 March 2024 25 | Seravezza | 1–2 | Livorno |

| 10 March 2024 26 | Livorno | 1–1 | Pianese | Livorno |
| | | | | Stadium: Stadio Armando Picchi |

| 17 March 2024 27 | Follonica Gavorrano | 1–0 | Livorno |

| 23 March 2024 28 | Livorno | 2–0 | San Donato Tavarnelle | Livorno |
| | | | | Stadium: Stadio Armando Picchi |

| 28 March 2024 29 | Cenaia | 1–1 | Livorno |

| 7 April 2024 30 | Livorno | 1–1 | Montevarchi | Livorno |
| | | | | Stadium: Stadio Armando Picchi |

| 14 April 2024 31 | Figline 1965 | 2–1 | Livorno |

| 21 April 2024 32 | Livorno | 1–0 | Sangiovannese | Livorno |
| | | | | Stadium: Stadio Armando Picchi |

| 28 April 2024 33 | Livorno | 2–1 | Trestina | Livorno |
| | | | | Stadium: Stadio Armando Picchi |

| 5 May 2024 34 | Orvietana Calcio | 1–0 | Livorno |

==== Promotion play-off ====
| 12 May 2024 Semi-final | Grosseto | 3–2 | Livorno | Grosseto |
| 17:30 CEST (UTC+2) | | | | Stadium: Stadio Olimpico Carlo Zecchini |

=== Coppa Italia Serie D ===
| 2 September 2023 First round | Seravezza Pozzi | 1–2 | Livorno |
| 18:00 CEST (UTC+2) | Putzolu 6' | | Cesarini 11'; Giordani 53' |

| 18 October 2023 Round of 64 | Livorno | 1–1 (5–4 p) | Ghivizzano | Livorno |
| | | | | Stadium: Stadio Armando Picchi |

| 22 November 2023 Round of 32 | Livorno | 3–0 | Poggibonsi | Livorno |
| 14:30 | Cesarini 14', 25'; Ferraro 52' | | | Stadium: Stadio Armando Picchi; Referee: Guitaldi di Rimini |

| 29 November 2023 Round of 16 | Follonica Gavorrano | 3–0; Awarded | Livorno |
| | | Report | Luis Henrique 65'; Curcio 90+3' | Referee: Filippo Pazzarelli |
Note: The original score was a 0–2 win to Livorno. It was awarded as a forfeit to Follonica Gavorrano due to Livorno fielding an ineligible player (Bassini).
