= La nave di Teseo =

Italian publishing house

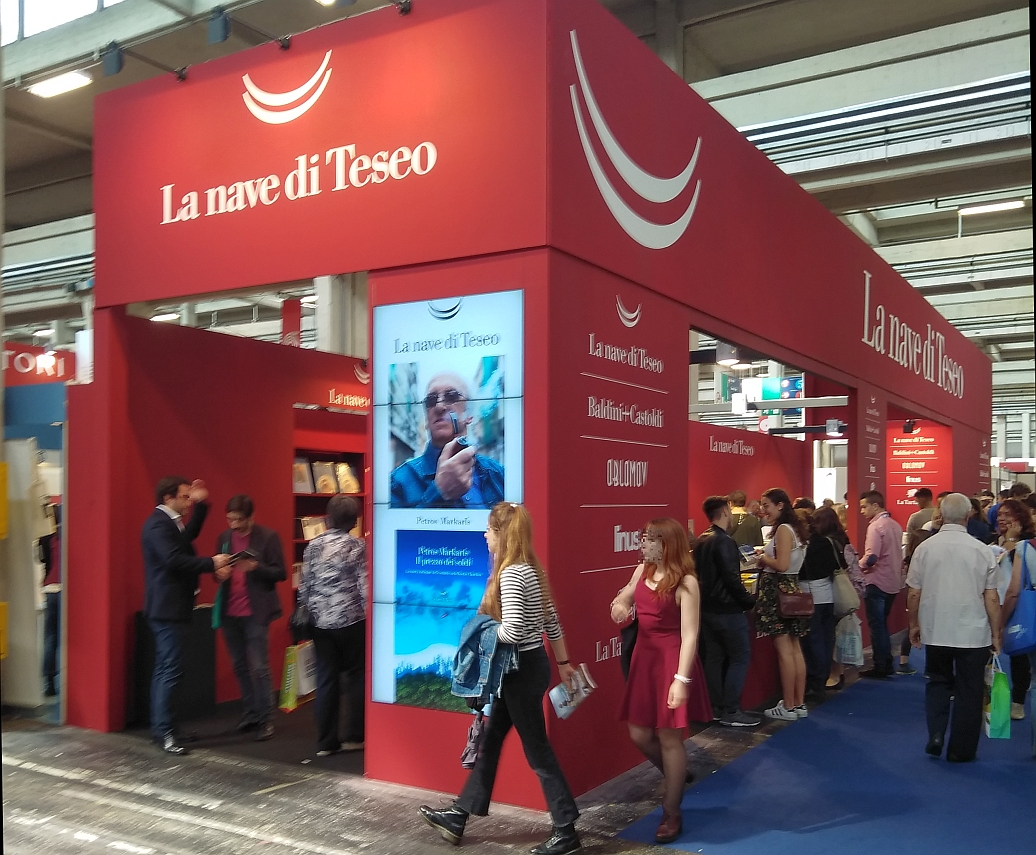
- La nave di Teseo's stand at the 2018 Turin International Book Fair
- Founded: November 2015
- Founder: Umberto Eco, Elisabetta Sgarbi, Mario Andreose, Eugenio Lio and others
- Country of origin: Italy
- Headquarters location: Milan
- Publication types: Books
- Nonfiction topics: Fiction, non-fiction, poetry
- Imprints: Baldini + Castoldi, Oblomov, Linus, La tartaruga
- Official website: lanavediteseo.eu

La nave di Teseo (Italian for "The Ship of Theseus") is an Italian independent publishing house based in Milan. It was founded in November 2015 by a group of publishers, editors and writers led by Umberto Eco, Elisabetta Sgarbi, Mario Andreose and Eugenio Lio. Its catalogue includes fiction, non-fiction and poetry, by both Italian and international authors.

The company's logo consists of two dark-blue upward-curving lines suggesting both a ship and a smile. It was conceived by Francesco Messina and subsequently developed by designer and architect Pierluigi Cerri.

== History ==
La nave di Teseo was founded in November 2015 in the context of the sale by RCS MediaGroup of several of its publishing houses to Mondadori Group. Among the publishers involved in the transaction was Bompiani, one of Italy's major literary publishing houses. A group associated with Bompiani, led by Umberto Eco and including its editorial director Elisabetta Sgarbi and publisher Mario Andreose, together with a number of prominent writers, decided to leave the company and establish a new independent publishing house.

The name of the company refers to the philosophical paradox of the Ship of Theseus, concerning whether an object whose constituent parts have all been replaced remains fundamentally the same object. The name consequently alluded to both continuity with, and independence from, the publishing tradition from which the founders had emerged.

In March 2016, a few months after the foundation of La nave di Teseo, the Italian Competition Authority required Mondadori to divest Bompiani as a condition of approving its acquisition of RCS Libri. By then, however, Sgarbi, Eco and their associates had already established the new publishing house. In September 2016 Bompiani was acquired by Giunti Editore, despite an attempt by Sgarbi to acquire it and reunite the catalogues of the authors who had joined La nave di Teseo.

From its foundation, the publisher's authors included, in addition to co-founder Umberto Eco, Sandro Veronesi, Tahar Ben Jelloun, Edoardo Nesi, Furio Colombo, Sergio Claudio Perroni, Nicla Jegher, Jean-Claude Fasquelle, Nuccio Ordine, Mario Andreose and Mauro Covacich.

In 2016 the company published the Italian edition of Joby Warrick's Black Flags: The Rise of ISIS (Bandiere nere. La nascita dell'ISIS), which received the 2016 Pulitzer Prize for General Nonfiction.

In June 2017 La nave di Teseo acquired control of Baldini & Castoldi, purchasing 95% of its share capital and recapitalising the company with its own resources.

== Authors and publications ==
Among the publisher's early books was Mauro Covacich's La città interiore, which received the Popular Jury Prize at the 2017 Premio Letterario Latisana per il Nord-Est and placed fourth in the 2017 Campiello Prize. Elena Stancanelli's La femmina nuda was a finalist for the 2016 Strega Prize and received the Premio Vittoriano Esposito. The publisher also issued the Italian edition of Carolin Emcke's Against Hate (Contro l'odio); Emcke received the 2016 Peace Prize of the German Book Trade.

In 2017 La nave di Teseo published the Italian edition of Matthew Desmond's Evicted: Poverty and Profit in the American City (Sfrattati), winner of that year's Pulitzer Prize for General Nonfiction. This was followed by the Italian editions of several other Pulitzer Prize-winning books: Andrew Sean Greer's Less, winner of the 2018 Pulitzer Prize for Fiction; Richard Powers's The Overstory (Italian: Il sussurro del mondo), winner of the 2019 Pulitzer Prize for Fiction; and Anne Boyer's The Undying (Italian: Non morire), winner of the 2020 Pulitzer Prize for General Nonfiction.

In 2018 the publisher began collaborating with linguist and neuroscientist Andrea Moro, publishing his first novel, Il segreto di Pietramala, which received the Flaiano Prize for literature. Moro subsequently published other works with La nave di Teseo, including a dialogue with linguist Noam Chomsky.

In 2019 the company published Claudia Durastanti's novel La straniera, which was a finalist for the 2019 Strega Prize. The book received several other literary awards, including the Premio Strega Off, the Premio Pozzale Luigi Russo and the Premio Sila '49, and was shortlisted or selected for the final stages of the Premio Alassio Centolibri, Viareggio Prize and Premio Stresa.

Other notable publications included Laura Pariani's novel Il gioco di Santa Oca, a finalist for the Campiello Prize, and Sandro Veronesi's Il colibrì. The latter was named "Book of the Year" for 2019 in the quality ranking compiled by La Lettura, the cultural supplement of Corriere della Sera, and subsequently won the 2020 Strega Prize.

In 2020 several authors published by La nave di Teseo received major Italian literary awards. Literary critic and scholar Giulio Ferroni won the non-fiction section of the Viareggio Prize and the critical work section of the Premio Mondello for L'Italia di Dante. Viaggio nel paese della Commedia. Amin Maalouf received the Premio Terzani for Le naufrage des civilisations (Italian: Il naufragio delle civiltà), while Claudio Magris received the MARetica Prize for Polene. Gli occhi del mare.

== Imprints and associated publishers ==
La nave di Teseo has expanded its activities through acquisitions and associated publishing brands. In addition to Baldini+Castoldi, its publishing group includes Oblomov, Linus and La tartaruga, a historic Italian publishing imprint originally founded in 1975.

== See also ==
- Elisabetta Sgarbi
- Umberto Eco
- Bompiani
- Baldini+Castoldi
