= Tommaso Tentoni =

Italian footballer (born 1997)

Personal information
- Date of birth: 10 June 1997 (age 29)
- Place of birth: Ancona, Italy
- Height: 1.75 m (5 ft 9 in)
- Position: Right-back

Team information
- Current team: Varese

Youth career
- –2015: Atalanta

Senior career*
Years	Team	Apps	(Gls)
2015–2019	Atalanta	0	(0)
2015–2017	→ Forlì (loan)	53	(8)
2017–2018	→ Carrarese (loan)	37	(1)
2018–2019	→ Alessandria (loan)	15	(1)
2019–2020	Imolese	25	(0)
2020–2021	Seregno	29	(2)
2021–2023	Novara	39	(3)
2023–2024	Carpi	17	(2)
2024	Riccione	7	(0)
2025	Piacenza	11	(0)
2025–2026	Varese	29	(10)
- * Club domestic league appearances and goals as of 25 June 2026

Tommaso Tentoni (born 10 June 1997) is an Italian footballer who plays as a right-back.

== Career ==
=== Atalanta ===
Born in Ancona, Tentoni was a youth exponent of Atalanta. Here he made 23 appearances and scored 1 goal for their U-19 team.

==== Loan to Forlì ====
On 1 July 2015, Tentoni was loaned to Serie D side Forlì on a 2-year loan deal. On 6 September, Tentoni made his Serie D debut and he scored his first goal for Forlì in the 58th minute of a 5–1 away win over Villafranca Veronese, he played the entire match. On 11 November he scored his second goal in the 9th minute of a 4–3 home win over Lentigione. On 20 December he scored his third goal in the 83rd minute of a 5–1 home win over Delta Porto Tolle. Tentoni ended his first season to Forlì with 30 appearances and 3 goals and he helped the team to reach the promotion in Serie C, and on 27 August 2016, Tentoni made his professional debut in Serie C in a 1–0 away defeat against Venezia, he was replaced by Gianluca Piccoli in the 43rd minute. On 24 September he played his first entire match in Serie C, a 1–0 away defeat against Sambenedettese. On 7 September he scored twice in a 2–2 away draw against Bassano Virtus. Tentoni ended his second season to Forlì with 27 appearances, 5 goals and 1 assist, but Forlì was relegated in Serie D after the play-out matches against Fano. In total Tentoni made 55 appearances, 8 goals and 1 assist.

==== Loan to Carrarese ====
On 17 July 2017, Tentoni was loaned to Serie C club Carrarese on a season-long loan deal. On 27 August he made his Serie C debut for Carrarese and he also scored his first goal for the club in the 29th minute of a 1–0 away win over Cuneo, he played the entire match. He became Carrarese's first-choice early in the season. From 27 August to 18 February, Tentoni played 25 consecutive entire match for Carrarese. Tentoni ended his season-long loan to Carrarese with 37 appearances, including 34 as a starter, scoring 1 goal and making 2 assists.

==== Loan to Alessandria ====
On 20 July 2018, Tentoni was signed by Serie C side Alessandria on a season-long loan deal. On 29 July he made his debut for Alessandria in a 1–0 home defeat against Giana Erminio in the first round of Coppa Italia, he played the entire match. On 16 September he made his Serie C debut for the team in a 2–1 away win over Juventus U23, he played the entire match. On 23 December he scored his first goal for the team in the 75th minute of a 1–1 home draw against Pontedera. Tentoni ended his season-long loan to Alessandria with 17 appearances and 1 goal.

=== Imolese ===
On 16 July 2019, Tentoni joined to Serie C club Imolese on free-transfer and he signed a 2-year contract. On 4 August he made his debut for Imolese and scored also his first goal for the club in the 51st minute of a match won 4–3 at penalties after a 3–3 draw against Sambenedettese in the first round of Coppa Italia, he was replaced by Filippo Artioli in the 88th minute. On 25 August he made his league debut for Imolese in a 2–1 away defeat against Rimini, he was replaced by Abdoulaye Sall in the 91st minute. On 29 September he played his first entire match for the club, a 1–0 away defeat against Cesena.

=== Seregno ===
On 14 August 2020 he moved to Seregno in Serie D.

=== Novara ===
For the 2021-22 season, he joined to Novara.

=== Carpi ===
On 13 July 2023 he moved to Carpi in Serie D.

== Career statistics ==
=== Club ===
As of 25 October 2019

Club	Season	League			Cup		Europe		Other		Total	
Club	Season	League	Apps	Goals	Apps	Goals	Apps	Goals	Apps	Goals	Apps	Goals
Forlì (loan)	2015–16	Serie D	28	3	0	0	—		2 (Note: All appearance(s) in Serie D play-off.)	0	30	3
Forlì (loan)	2016–17	Serie C	25	5	0	0	—		2 (Note: All appearance(s) in Serie C play-out.)	0	27	5
Total Forli			53	8	0	0	—		4	0	57	8
Carrarese (loan)	2017–18	Serie C	35	1	0	0	—		2 (Note: All appearance(s) in Serie C play-off.)	0	37	1
Alessandria (loan)	2018–19	Serie C	15	1	1	0	—		1	0	17	1
Imolese	2019–20	Serie C	25	0	3	1	—		2	0	30	1
Seregno	2020–21	Serie D	29	2	—		—		—		29	2
Novara	2021–22	Serie D	33	3	—		—		—		33	3
Novara	2022-23	Serie C	6	0	0	0	0	0	0	0	6	0
Career total			196	15	4	1	—		9	0	209	16
