= Agustín Medina =

Agustín Medina may refer to:

- Agustín Medina (footballer, born 1994), Spanish football midfielder for Albacete
- Agustín Medina (footballer, born 1999), Argentine former football forward
- Agustín Medina (footballer, born 2006), Argentine football midfielder for Lanús
