= Gianluca Piccoli =

Italian footballer (born 1997)

Personal information
- Date of birth: 30 May 1997 (age 29)
- Height: 1.85 m (6 ft 1 in)
- Position: Midfielder

Youth career
- –2015: Varese
- 2015–2016: Torino

Senior career*
Years	Team	Apps	(Gls)
2015–2019	Torino	0	(0)
2016–2017	→ Forlì (loan)	18	(0)
2017–2018	→ Ravenna (loan)	29	(0)
2018–2019	→ Giana Erminio (loan)	29	(1)
2019–2020	Giana Erminio	25	(2)
2020–2021	Livorno	9	(0)
2021–2022	Grosseto	44	(1)
2022–2023	Città di Varese	13	(0)
2023–2024	Prato	5	(0)
2025–2026	Chiasso		
- * Club domestic league appearances and goals as of 26 September 2026

Gianluca Piccoli (born 30 May 1997) is an Italian footballer who plays as a midfielder.

== Club career ==
=== Torino ===
Piccoli joined to Torino in July 2015 from Serie B club Varese.

==== Loan to Forlì ====
On 15 July 2016, Piccoli was signed by Serie C club Forlì on a season-long loan deal for the 2016–17 season. On 27 August he made his professional debut in Serie C for Forlì as a substitute replacing Tommaso Tentoni in the 43rd minute of a 1–0 away defeat against Venezia. On 22 October, Piccoli played his first match as a starter and his first entire match for Forlì, a 0–0 away draw against Lumezzane. Piccoli ended his season-long loan to Forlì with 18 appearances, only 5 as a starter, however after losing the play-out matches against Fano, Forli was relegated in Serie D, he was an unused substitute during the play-out.

==== Loan to Ravenna ====
On 1 August 2017, Piccoli was loaned to Serie C side Ravenna on a season-long loan deal. Four weeks later, on 27 August, he made his debut for Ravenna in Serie C as a substitute replacing Christian Cenci in the 64th minute of a 1–0 home win over Fermana. On 17 September, Piccoli played his first match as a starter in Serie C, a 3–2 away defeat against Ternana, he was replaced by Carmine De Sena in the 53rd minute. On 10 February 2018 he played his first entire match for Ravenna, a 2–1 home defeat against Fano. Piccoli ended his season-long loan to Ravenna with 29 appearances, including only 10 as a starter.

==== Loan to Giana Erminio ====
On 17 July 2018, Piccoli was signed by Serie C club Giana Erminio on a season-long loan deal. On 29 July he made his debut for the club as a substitute replacing Antonio Palma in the 62nd minute of a 1–0 away win over Alessandria in the first round of Coppa Italia. On 16 September he made his debut in Serie C for Giana Erminio as a substitute replacing Riccardo Chiarello in the 70th minute of a 0–0 away draw against Vicenza Virtus. On 17 October, Piccoli played his first match as a starter for Giana Erminio, a 1–1 home draw against Ravenna, he was replaced by Andrea Mandelli in the 74th minute. On 21 October he scored his first professional goal in 65th minute of a 3–0 away win over Virtus Verona. On 11 November he played his first entire match of the season, a 0–0 home draw against Südtirol. Piccoli ended his loan with 30 appearances and 1 goal.

=== Giana Erminio ===
On 2 July 2019, after one year on loan, Piccoli joined to Serie C club Giana Erminio on a free-transfer and a 2-year contract. On 25 August he played his first match of the season for the club as a substitute replacing Lorenzo Remedi in the 68th minute of a 2–0 home defeat against Renate. Three weeks later, on 15 September, he played his first entire match for the club in this season, a 1–1 away draw against Gozzano. One week later, Piccoli scored his first goal of the season in the 57th minute of a 1–1 home draw against Carrarese. On 13 October he scored his second goal in the 20th minute of a 2–1 home win over Novara. However at the end of the first season at Giana Erminio, after having made 27 appearancesand scored 2 goals, he became a free agent.

=== Livorno ===
On 6 November 2020, Piccoli joined to Serie C side Livorno on a free-transfer. Only two days later, on 8 November, he made his debut for the club as a substitute replacing Matteo Pallecchi in the 63rd minute, however he was sent-off with a red card in the 92nd minute of a 3–2 away defeat against Alessandria. On 14 November, Piccoli played his first match as a starter for Livorno, a 2–1 home defeat against Carrarese, he was replaced after 82 minute by Lorenzo Pecchia. One weeks later, on 21 November, he played his first entire match for the club, a 1–0 away defeat against Grosseto.

=== Grosseto ===
On 1 February 2021, he moved to Grosseto.

== Career statistics ==
=== Club ===
As of match played 19 December 2021

Club	Season	League			National cup		League cup		Other		Total	
Club	Season	League	Apps	Goals	Apps	Goals	Apps	Goals	Apps	Goals	Apps	Goals
Forlì (loan)	2016–17	Serie C	18	0	0	0	2	0	—		20	0
Ravenna (loan)	2017–18	Serie C	27	0	0	0	3	0	—		30	0
Giana Erminio (loan)	2018–19	Serie C	29	1	1	0	1	0	—		30	1
Giana Erminio	2019–20	Serie C	25	2	0	0	2	0	2 (Note: All appearance(s) in Serie C play-out.)	0	29	2
Livorno	2020–21	Serie C	9	0	0	0	—		—		9	0
Grosseto	2020–21	Serie C	10	1	0	0	—		2	0	12	1
Grosseto	2021–22	Serie C	17	0	0	0	2	0	—		19	0
Grosseto	Total		27	1	0	0	2	0	2	0	31	1
Career total			135	4	1	0	10	0	4	0	149	5

== Honours ==
=== Club ===
Torino Primavera

- Supercoppa Primavera: 2015
