= Domenico Danti =

Italian footballer (born 1989)

Personal information
- Date of birth: 12 January 1989 (age 37)
- Place of birth: San Giovanni in Fiore, Italy
- Height: 1.77 m (5 ft 9 1/2 in)
- Position: Forward

Team information
- Current team: Stelle Azzurre

Youth career
- –2007: Rende

Senior career*
Years	Team	Apps	(Gls)
2007–2010	Cosenza	83	(12)
2010–2011	Siena	0	(0)
2010–2011	→ Reggina (loan)	7	(1)
2011–2013	Vicenza	3	(0)
2012	→ Ternana (loan)	9	(1)
2013–2014	Nocerina	15	(3)
2014–2015	Barletta	24	(2)
2015–2016	AlbinoLeffe	28	(2)
2016–2017	Turris	2	(0)
2017–2024	Virtus Verona	212	(51)
2024–2025	Ragusa	0	(0)
2025–	Stelle Azzurre		
- * Club domestic league appearances and goals as of 3 May 2024

Domenico Danti (born 12 January 1989) is an Italian footballer who plays as a forward for Serie D club Ragusa.

== Club career ==
=== Cosenza ===
Danti started his career at Rende. In 2007 the club relocated to the capital of the Province to replace bankrupted A.S. Cosenza Calcio, despite Rende also relegated from Serie C2 to Serie D in 2006–07 Serie C2 season. He received call-up from Italy U18 amateur team in 2008 as well as Italy U20 team in May 2010. The team promoted from Serie D (was fifth division until 2014) to Lega Pro Seconda Divisione (ex–Serie C2) in 2008.

=== Siena ===
On 29 January 2010 A.C. Siena signed the forward on a co-ownership deal for €300,000 from the third division club Cosenza, despite returned to Cosenza for the rest of 2009–10 Lega Pro Prima Divisione. Siena also sold Emanuele Ameltonis to Cosenza also in co-ownership deal in July 2009 for a peppercorn fee (€500).

In June 2010 Siena acquired him outright, for another €450,000. On 30 August 2010 he left for Reggina in temporary deal. Danti also received a first team shirt number of no.32 for Siena in July 2010.

Despite a disappointing season with the Serie B club, in June 2011 Danti was sold to another Serie B club Vicenza in another co-ownership deal, for €425,000 in 3-year contract, as part of the deal that Siena signed the remain 50% registration rights of Alessio Sestu for €525,000 (€100,000 cash + half of Danti).

=== Vicenza ===
Danti was awarded no.90 shirt for Vicenza Calcio. He also signed a 3-year contract. Danti only played once for the second division club and on 3 January 2012 left for Ternana in temporary deal. In June 2012 Siena gave up the remain 50% registration rights of Danti to Vicenza for free.

=== Nocerina ===
On 2 September 2013 Danti was transferred to Nocerina. The club was automatically relegated to 2014–15 Serie D in mid-season due to sports fraud in the derby against Salernitana. Danti had received call-up to that match and "injured" in the 15th minutes, the 6th "injured" players of the match.

He was banned one year along with Edmund Hottor, Petar Kostadinović, Franco Lepore and Lorenzo Remedi. (the 4th to 8th "injured" players)
