= Arrighi =

Arrighi is a surname. Notable people with the surname include:

- Christine Arrighi, French politician
- Ernest Arrighi de Casanova, French Bonapartist politician
- Gianluca Arrighi, Italian novelist
- Giovanni Arrighi, Italian sociologist
- Giuseppe Arrighi, Italian painter
- Jean-Toussaint Arrighi de Casanova, French general
- Luciana Arrighi, Australian production designer
- Ludovico Vicentino degli Arrighi, papal scribe and type designer in Renaissance Italy
- Niké Arrighi, French visual artist and actress
- Pascal Arrighi, French politician
