= Peluffo =

Peluffo is a surname. Notable people with the surname include:

- Ana Luisa Peluffo (1929–2026), Mexican actress
- Luisa Peluffo (born 1941), Argentine writer and journalist
- Mariano Peluffo (born 1971), Argentine TV host and producer
- Norberto Peluffo (born 1958), Colombian footballer
- Vinicio Peluffo (born 1971), Italian politician
- Daniel Peluffo-Wiese (born 2003), American-born Uruguayan professional footballer
