= Edmund Hottor =

Ghanaian footballer (born 1993)

Personal information
- Full name: Edmund Etsè Hottor
- Date of birth: 6 May 1993 (age 33)
- Place of birth: Accra, Ghana
- Height: 1.84 m (6 ft 1/2 in)
- Position: Midfielder

Team information
- Current team: St Ives Town

Youth career
- 2008–2009: Triestina

Senior career*
Years	Team	Apps	(Gls)
2009–2010	Triestina	3	(0)
2010–2015	AC Milan	0	(0)
2012–2013	→ Lanciano (loan)	3	(0)
2013–2014	→ Nocerina (loan)	11	(0)
2014–2015	→ Venezia (loan)	2	(0)
2016–2017	Inter Milan	0	(0)
2016	→ Atlético CP (loan)	0	(0)
2016–2017	→ Fafe (loan)	15	(2)
2017–2018	Sliema Wanderers	0	(0)
2018	Kettering Town	1	(0)
2018–2019	Banbury United	19	(0)
2019–	St Ives Town	225	(15)
- * Club domestic league appearances and goals as of 21:00, 11 December 2019 (UTC)

Edmund Etsè Hottor (born 6 May 1993) is a Ghanaian professional footballer who plays as a midfielder for Northern Premier League Division One Midlands club St Ives Town.

== Club career ==
=== Triestina ===
Hottor signed for Triestina in July 2008. The then 15-year-old midfielder spent his first season in Italy playing for the youth team of his club. The following season, he made his professional debut in a Serie B game against Gallipoli, on 17 October 2009. He then went on to make two more appearances with the senior squad.

=== Milan ===
On 3 November 2009, Milan reached an agreement with Triestina, under which Hottor would be transferred to Milan in a co-ownership deal the following January. The move was officially finalised on 11 January 2010, for €800,000. At the end of the season, the co-ownership was renewed for one more year, while at the beginning of the 2011–12 season Hottor's playing rights were fully purchased by Milan, for an additional €100,000. After six years at the club he left for A.C.'s city rivals Inter. He never played a game for A.C. Milan

==== Virtus Lanciano (loan) ====
At the beginning of the 2012–13 season, Hottor was sent out on loan to newly promoted Serie B club Virtus Lanciano.

==== Nocerina (loan) ====
For the 2013–14 campaign, Hottor was sent on a further loan spell to Prima Divisione side Nocerina. However the club was expelled from the league due to sports fraud in the derby against Salernitana. In that match Nocerina had 3 players "injured" followed by Remedi, Hottor, Danti, Kostadinović and Franco Lepore. The first 3 "injured" players were acquitted but the latter 5 were suspended from football for 1 year. Hottor's ban was later reduced.

==== Venezia (loan) ====
On 16 July 2014 Hottor joined Lega Pro club Venezia on loan.

=== Internazionale ===
On 31 January 2016 Hottor signed for Internazionale on a free transfer.

==== Atlético CP (loan) ====
On 1 February 2016 Portuguese Segunda Liga club Atlético CP signed Hottor on loan until 30 June 2016.

=== Olbia and Fafe ===
He was trained with Lega Pro side Olbia in summer 2016. He played 3 friendlies for the club. However, the club did not sign him. He returned to Portugal again for AD Fafe on 30 August on a reported loan.

=== St Ives Town ===
Hotter signed for Southern League Premier Central side St Ives Town on 9 December 2019.

== Statistics ==
Updated 1 September 2013.

Team	Season	Domestic League		Domestic Cup		European Competition^{1}		Other Tournaments^{2}		Total	
Team	Season	Apps	Goals	Apps	Goals	Apps	Goals	Apps	Goals	Apps	Goals
Triestina	2009–10	3	0	0	0	–		–		3	0
Milan	2010	0	0	0	0	0	0	–		0	0
Milan	2010–11	0	0	0	0	0	0	–		0	0
Milan	2011–12	0	0	0	0	0	0	0	0	0	0
Milan	Total	0	0	0	0	0	0	0	0	0	0
Virtus Lanciano	2012–13	3	0	1	0	–		–		4	0
Nocerina	2013–14	1	0	1	0	–		0	0	2	0
Career Total		7	0	2	0	0	0	0	0	9	0

^{1}European competitions include UEFA Champions League.
^{2}Other tournaments include Supercoppa Italiana and Coppa Italia Lega Pro.
