= Petar Kostadinović =

Croatian footballer

Personal information
- Full name: Petar Juzvisen Kostadinović
- Date of birth: 29 October 1992 (age 34)
- Place of birth: Rijeka, Croatia
- Height: 1.86 m (6 ft 1 in)
- Position: Right back

Team information
- Current team: ASD Liapiave

Youth career
- Juventus
- 2010–2011: Lecce

Senior career*
Years	Team	Apps	(Gls)
2011–2012	Ancona	27	(2)
2012–2014	Nocerina	11	(0)
2012–2013	→ Prato (loan)	5	(0)
2013	→ Sorrento (loan)	11	(0)
2014–2015	Vigor Lamezia	24	(0)
2015–2016	Dro Alto Garda Calcio	32	(0)
2016–2017	Ancona	16	(0)
2017	Union ArzignanoChiampo	13	(0)
2017–2018	AC Trento	10	(0)
2019–2020	Dro Alto Garda Calcio		
2020–2021	ASD Liventina		
2021–	ASD Liapiave		
- * Club domestic league appearances and goals as of 25 February 2018

Petar Juzvisen Kostadinović (born 29 October 1992) is a Croatian footballer who plays for AC Trento as a defender.

== Career ==
Born in Rijeka, Croatia, Kostadinović was signed by Lecce on a free transfer on 7 September 2010, from Juventus. In the next season he was signed by Serie D (Italian fifth division until 2014) club Ancona. He played 27 times in the amateur league.

=== Nocerina ===
On 26 July 2012 the third division club Nocerina signed him. He was an unused bench in 2012–13 Italian Cup. On 31 August he was signed by fellow third division club Prato. On 31 January 2013 Kostadinović left for Sorrento, with Alessandro Cesarini and Alessandro Di Dio moved to opposite direction.

On 1 July 2013 Kostadinović returned to Nocera Inferiore. However the club was expelled from the league due to sports fraud in the derby against Salernitana. The match on 10 November 2013 Nocerina had 3 players "injured" in the first minute followed by Remedi, Hottor, Danti, Kostadinović and Lepore. The first 3 "injured" players were acquitted but the latter 5 were suspended from football for 1 year. The ban later reduced to 8 months.

On 1 August 2014 Nocerina was assigned to Eccellenza, two divisions below Lega Pro, now as a one unified division.

=== Vigor Lamezia ===
On 9 July 2014 he was signed by Vigor Lamezia. Due to the ban, Kostadinović made his competitive club debut in October.
