= Pecchia =

Pecchia is an Italian surname. Notable people with the surname include:

- Fabio Pecchia (born 1973), Italian footballer and manager
- Joseph Pecchia (1889–1974), French sport shooter
- Lorenzo Pecchia (born 2002), Italian footballer
