= Raffaele Festa Campanile =

Raffaele Festa Campanile (Born in Rome, August 26, 1961) is an Italian television author, screenwriter, film director, music producer. Son of the painter Anna Salvatore and of film director Pasquale Festa Campanile.

== Film director ==
- 1992 Le mele marce, screenwriter also.

== Assistant director ==
- 1981 "Culo e Camicia" with Enrico Montesano and Renato Pozzetto
- 1982 "Più bello di così si muore" with Enrico Montesano and Monica Guerritore
- 1983 "Un povero ricco" with Renato Pozzetto and Ornella Muti
- 1983 "Il petomane" with Ugo Tognazzi and Mariangela Melato

== Screenwriter ==
- 1988: "La prossima volta rinasco donna"
- 1989: "Randagio di razza", written with Lino Banfi
- 1990: "Buon Natale... Buon anno". Film by Luigi Comencini with Virna Lisi, Michel Serrault, Mattia Sbragia,
- 1993: "Zes, il deserto dei soldi". Film television by Michelangelo Antonioni

== Television ==
- 1994 Tededocchio, for Antenna Cinema
- 1995 Forum di sera, Rete4. Conducted by Rita Dalla Chiesa
- 1995-96 Carramba che sorpresa, conducted by Raffaella Carrà
- 1996 Così come siamo
- 1996 I cervelloni, conducted by Paolo Bonolis,
- 1997 Le mode di moda

== Music producer ==
- 2007 "6 sexy" by Carmen Serra as singer. Written by her and Roberto Casini
- 2008 "Mi piacerebbe" by Carmen Serra as singer. Written by her and Raffaele Festa Campanile
- 2009 "Da oggi in poi" by Carmen Serra as singer and songwriter

== Music collaborations ==
- Music collaborations with Roberto Casini, Stefano Cenci, Alessio Bonomo, Gianluca Attanasio, Francesco Arpino, Roberto Guarino, Francesco Musacco.
