= Janis Cavagna =

Italian football player

Personal information
- Date of birth: 12 March 1995 (age 31)
- Place of birth: Bergamo, Italy
- Height: 1.78 m (5 ft 10 in)
- Position: Midfielder

Team information
- Current team: GS Arconatese

Youth career
- –2015: Atalanta

Senior career*
Years	Team	Apps	(Gls)
2015–2018	Atalanta	0	(0)
2015–2016	→ Trapani (loan)	13	(0)
2016–2017	→ Bassano Virtus (loan)	7	(0)
2017	→ Monopoli (loan)	8	(1)
2017–2018	→ Pro Piacenza (loan)	30	(0)
2018–2019	Reggiana	32	(1)
2019–2021	Villa Valle	46	(4)
2021–2022	Olginatese	36	(7)
2022	Seregno	7	(0)
2022–	GS Arconatese	24	(0)
- * Club domestic league appearances and goals as of 4 October 2023

Janis Cavagna (born 12 March 1995) is an Italian football player who plays for Serie D club GS Arconatese.

== Club career ==
=== Atalanta ===
==== Loan to Trapani ====
On 9 August 2015, Cavagna was signed by Serie B side Trapani on a season-long loan deal. On 6 September he made his Serie B debut for Trapani as a substitute replacing Matteo Scozzarella in the 84th minute of a 3–0 home win over Ternana. On 19 September, Cavagna played his first match as a starter, a 1–1 home draw against Virtus Lanciano, he was replaced by Mirko Eramo in the 82nd minute. On 21 November he played his first entire match for Trapani, a 2–1 home win over Modena. Cavagna ended his loan to Trapani with 13 appearances and 1 assist.

==== Loan to Bassano Virtus and Monopoli ====
On 12 July 2016, Cavagna was loaned to Serie C club Bassano Virtus on a season-long loan deal. On 31 July he made his debut for Bassano Virtus in a 5–3 match won at penalties after a 1–1 home draw against Fidelis Andria in the first round of Coppa Italia, he played the entire match. On 7 August he played in a 2–0 home win over Avellino in the second round. On 14 August he played in a 3–0 away defeat against Sampdoria in the third round. On 27 August, Cavagna made his Serie C debut for Bassano Virtus in a 2–1 home win over Reggiana, he played the entire match. In January 2017, Cavagna was re-called to Atalanta leaving Bassano Virtus with only 10 appearances.

On 23 January 2017, Cavagna was signed by Serie C club Monopoli on a 6-month loan deal. On 28 January he made his Serie C debut for Monopoli in a 1–1 home draw against Siracusa, he played the entire match. Cavagna ended his 6-month loan to Monopoli with only 8 appearances.

==== Loan to Pro Piacenza ====
On 10 July 2017, Cavagna was signed by Serie C club Pro Piacenza on a season-long loan deal. On 30 July he made his debut for Pro Piacenza as a substitute replacing Jonathan Aspas in the 62nd minute of a 4–1 away defeat against Vicenza in the first round of Coppa Italia. On 27 August he made his Serie C debut for Pro Piacenza as a substitute replacing Jonathan Aspas in the 88th minute of a 3–1 home win over Giana Erminio. On 8 November, Cavagna played his first match as a starter for Pro Piacenza, a 1–0 home win over Monza, he was replaced by Nicolas La Vigna in the 76th minute. On 12 November he played his first entire match for Pro Piacenza, a 1–1 away draw against Arezzo. Cavangna ended his loan to Pro Piacenza with 31 appearances and 1 assist.

=== Reggio Audace ===
On 21 August 2018, Cavagna joined to Serie D side Reggio Audace on a free-transfer and a 1-year contract. On 16 September he made his Serie D debut for the club in a 1–0 away defeat against Crema, he played the entire match. On 17 March 2019, Cavagna scored his first goal in Serie D for Reggio Audace in the 6th minute of a 2–1 away win over Mezzolara Calcio. Cavagna ended this season with Reggio Audace with 32 appearances, including 29 as a starter, 1 goal and 5 assists and he helped the team to reach the promotion in Serie C for the 2019–20 season, however his contract was not renewed after this season.

=== Villa d'Almè Valbrembana ===
In November 2019, Cavagna joined Serie D club A.S.D. Villa d'Almè Valle Brembana Calcio.

== Career statistics ==
=== Club ===
As of 25 September 2019

Club	Season	League			Cup		Europe		Other		Total	
Club	Season	League	Apps	Goals	Apps	Goals	Apps	Goals	Apps	Goals	Apps	Goals
Trapani (loan)	2015–16	Serie B	13	0	0	0	—		—		13	0
Bassano Virtus (loan)	2016–17	Serie C	7	0	3	0	—		—		10	0
Monopoli (loan)	2016–17	Serie C	8	1	—		—		—		8	1
Pro Piacenza (loan)	2017–18	Serie C	30	0	1	0	—		—		31	0
Reggio Audace	2018–19	Serie D	30	1	—		—		2 (Note: All appearance(s) in Serie D play-off.)	0	32	1
Career total			88	2	4	0	—		2	0	94	2
