= Nicolas La Vigna =

Italian footballer

Personal information
- Date of birth: 17 June 1997 (age 29)
- Place of birth: Milan, Italy
- Height: 1.73 m (5 ft 8 in)
- Position: Midfielder

Team information
- Current team: Cynthialbalonga

Youth career
- –2016: Atalanta

Senior career*
Years	Team	Apps	(Gls)
2016–2019	Atalanta	0	(0)
2016–2017	→ Piacenza (loan)	7	(0)
2017–2018	→ Pro Piacenza (loan)	34	(3)
2018–2019	→ Pontedera (loan)	32	(0)
2019–2020	Picerno	4	(0)
2020–2021	Torres	20	(1)
2021–2023	Lentigione	43	(4)
2023	Acireale	10	(0)
2023–	Cynthialbalonga	2	(0)
- * Club domestic league appearances and goals as of 20 December 2023

Nicolas La Vigna (born 17 June 1997) is an Italian football player who plays for Serie D club Cynthialbalonga.

== Club career ==
=== Atalanta ===
Born in Milan, La Vigna was a youth exponent of Atalanta.

==== Loan to Piacenza ====
On 11 July 2016, La Vigna was signed by Serie C side Piacenza on a season-long loan deal. On 4 December he made his professional debut in Serie C for Piacenza as a substitute replacing Andrea Razzitti in the 74th minute of a 4–1 home defeat against Racing Roma. On 26 March 2017, La Vigna played his first match as a starter for Piacenza, a 2–1 away win over Como, he was replaced by Alessandro Cazzamalli in the 72nd minute. La Vigna also helped the club to reach the play-offs, however Piacenza loss 2–0 against Parma, he played the last 5 minute as a substitute. He ended his season-long loan to Piacenza with only 8 appearances, including 4 of them as a starter, 1 assist, however he didn't play any entire match during the season.

==== Loan to Pro Piacenza ====
On 10 July 2017, La Vigna and Janis Cavagna were loaned by Serie C club Pro Piacenza on a season-long loan deal. On 30 July, he made his debut for Pro Piacenza in a 4–1 away defeat against Vicenza in the first round of Coppa Italia, he played the entire match. On 27 August, La Vigna made his Serie C debut for the club and he scored his first professional goal in the 50th minute of a 3–1 home win over Giana Erminio, he played the entire match. On 18 February 2018 he scored his second goal, as a substitute, in the 82nd minute of a 3–1 home win over Viterbese Castrense. On 28 April he scored his third goal for Pro Piacenza in the 29th minute of a 4–1 home win over Arzachena. La Vigna ended his season-long loan to Pro Piacenza with 35 appearances, 3 goals and 2 assists.

==== Loan to Pontedera ====
On 18 July 2018, La Vigna was loaned to Serie C side Pontedera on a season-long loan deal. Eleven days later, on 29 July, he made his debut and he also scored his first goal for the club in the 13th minute of a 1–1 away draw against Ternana, however Pontedera loss 4–2 defeat at penalties, in the first round of Coppa Italia, he was replaced by Michele Bruzzo in the 98th minute. On 22 September, La Vigna made his debut for Pontedera, in Serie C, in a 2–0 away defeat against Piacenza, he was replaced by Riccardo Benedetti after 79 minutes. Four days later, on 26 September, he played his first entire match for Pontedera, a 2–1 home win over Albissola. La Vigna ended his loan to Pontedera with 33 appearances, including 24 of them as a starter and scoring 1 goal.

=== Picerno ===
On 1 October 2019, La Vigna signed for newly promoted Serie C club Picerno on a free-transfer. Five days later, on 6 October, he made his debut for the club as a substitute replacing Umberto Nappello in the 67th minute of a 2–2 away draw against Bisceglie. On 31 January 2020, his contract with Picerno was terminated by mutual consent.

=== Torres ===
On 22 December 2020, La Vigna joined Serie D club Torres.

== Career statistics ==
=== Club ===
As of 3 February 2020

Club	Season	League			Cup		Europe		Other		Total	
Club	Season	League	Apps	Goals	Apps	Goals	Apps	Goals	Apps	Goals	Apps	Goals
Piacenza (loan)	2016–17	Serie C	7	0	0	0	—		1 (Note: All appearance(s) in Serie C play-off.)	0	8	0
Pro Piacenza (loan)	2017–18	Serie C	34	3	1	0	—		—		35	3
Pontedera (loan)	2018–19	Serie C	32	0	1	1	—		—		33	1
Picerno	2019–20	Serie C	4	0	0	0	—		—		4	0
Career total			78	3	2	1	—		1	0	81	4
