= Daniele Scattina =

Daniele Scattina (born 16 May 1967 at La Spezia, Italy) is an actor, director and writer. Graduate at "Il Mulino di Flora" theater school in Bologna directed by Perla Peragallo and Leo de Berardinis.

== Performances ==
- April 2009

Actor and director for "La neve era sporca", original music by Gianluca Attanasio Teatro in Scatola and Teatro Aldo Fabrizi di Morlupo Rome

- June 2008

Actor and director for "Caligola 2000" by the Nobel Prize Albert Camus Teatro dell'Orologio (Roma)

- Maj 2008

Protagonist and director for "Sol'Amleto" inspired by William Shakespeare Teatro Aldo Fabrizi di Morlupo (Rome)

- March 2008

Director for "Clan Macbeth" inspired by William Shakespeare Teatro Agorà (Roma)

- August 2007 – August 2008

Actor, director and writer of "AK-47 – Questo silenzio atroce", original music by Gianluca Attanasio The piece is winner of the XXXIII edition "Prize Fondi la Pastora" – Teatro Tor di nona (Rome) – In Czech republic, about "Festival Internazionale delle Avanguardie Black Theater of Praga; – in Sicily at: Palermo, Agrigento, Alcamo e Teatro comunale di Partanna (Trapani); – in Basilicata a: Potenza e Vaglio; – in Liguria presso il Teatro Palmaria (La Spezia); – nel Lazio presso: il Teatro Aldo Fabrizi di Morlupo (Roma), il Teatro di Terra (Velletri) ed il Festival del Teatro città di Fiano Romano (Roma). Daniele Scattina – www.metateatro.com Pagina 2 di 4

- August–December 2006

director for “Clown-visioni parziali sul ‘900” inspired by Luigi Pirandello and Nove, with Dell'Atti Piemonte, Liguria, Toscana, Abruzzo, Umbria.

- Maj 2006

Actor, director and writer for "AK-47 – Questo silenzio atroce", original music by Gianluca Attanasio Teatro Colosseo (Roma)

- February 2006

Director for "Clown-visioni parziali sul '900" inspired by Luigi PirandelloPirandello and Nove, with actress Dell'Atti Teatro Colosseo (Roma)

- March–September 2005

Director for "L'Animalità di Macbeth" inspired by W. Shakespeare Abruzzo, Basilicata – XII Festival Internazionale de L'Avana

- January–July 2005

Director for "Deutsche Requiem" inspired by Jorge Luis Borges, with A. Dell'Atti Torino, Milano, Perugia, Roma, Pescara e Lecco

- November–December 2004

Director for "Metropolis" by various authors Teatro dei Satiri (Roma)

- July 2004

Director for "L'Animalità di Macbeth", by W. Shakespeare Teatro India (Roma)

- June 2004

Director for "Romeo e Giulietta" by W. Shakespeare, music by Gianluca Attanasio Festival di Primavera – Villa Pamphili (Roma)

- April 2004

Director for "Deutsche Requiem" inspired by Jorge Luis Borges, con A. Dell'Atti Teatro Duse – Agrate Brianza (Milano) – Vincitore del premio "Arcobaleno”

- February–March 2004

Director for "L'Animalità di Macbeth" by W. Shakespeare Lazio, Umbria e Marche Luglio-Novembre 2003 Director for "Romeo and Juliet by W. Shakespeare Lazio

- February 2003

director and actor for "Sol'Amleto, ovvero studi di attimi di una fobia del vivere" by W. Shakespeare, music by Gianluca Attanasio Teatro del Centro (Roma)

- September 2002

Director for "L'Animalità di Macbeth" (III Variazione) da W. Shakespeare Teatro Colosseo (Rome)

Daniele Scattina – www.metateatro.com Pagina 3 di 4

- Maj-July 2002

Director for "La Commedia nella Tempesta" by W. Shakespeare Teatro dell'Orologio (Roma)

- February 2002

Director for "Riccardo III" by W. Shakespeare

- April–November 2001

Director for "L'Animalità di Macbeth" by W. Shakespeare Teatri: dell’Orologio, Belli e Colosseo

- Genuary 2001

director “Catene” da autori vari

- from October 2000 to today

He is director of “Teatro delle ombre”'s company

- February-Maj 2000

Actor as Agamennone in “Come una rivista” from Aeschylus to Totò, directed by da Leo de Berardinis

- April–June 1999

Actor as Otello in "Come una rivista" from Aeschylus to Totò, directed by Leo de Bernardinis

- July 1998

Protagonist and director for "Macbeth" by W. Shakespeare, at Courtyard Theatre in London, called from Peter Hall Company

- November-Genuary 1998

Protagonist and director for "Sol'Amleto" by W. Shakespeare Won as better piece and better actor at "Lavori in Corso" competition, organized by dall'ETI

- Maj-September 1996

Protagonist with G. Albertazzi and E. Gardini for "Macbeth" by W. Shakespeare, directed by F. Balestra

- March–July 1996

Protagonist and director for "Deliri" da autori vari

- Juny–August 1995

He is Hamm in "Finale di partita" by Samuel Beckett, directed by Simona Generali

- April-Maj 1995

he is Jean in "La signorina Julie" by Strindberg, directed by Chiara Labianca

- March–Juny 1993

he is Ariel in "Epifanie di una Tempesta" by W. Shakespeare, directed by da R. Latini

- September 1991 – October 1995

Collaborations as actor with the director D. Valmaggi, carrying on: – il poeta Marino in “Roma a Corte” by various authors; – Don Giovanni in “Festa di Don Giovanni” by Molière – Dante in "I migliori attori del Mondo" by various authors.

== Awards ==
- 1996: "Prize ETI", Rome, 1996 as actor for "Sol'Amleto”
- 2002: "Prize Viviani", Napoli, as actor for "Macbeth”
- 2005: "Prize Arcobaleno", Milan, as actor and better show for "Deutsche Requiem";
- 2007: "Prieze Fondi la Pastora", Rome, as better show for "AK-47 – Questo silenzio atroce", original music by Gianluca Attanasio
