= Michele Bruzzo =

Italian footballer (born 1999)

Personal information
- Date of birth: 26 June 1999 (age 27)
- Place of birth: Genoa, Italy
- Height: 1.80 m (5 ft 11 in)
- Position: Midfielder

Team information
- Current team: SC Ligorna 1922
- Number: 18

Youth career
- –2018: Genoa

Senior career*
| Years | Team | Apps | (Gls) |
| 2018–2019 | Genoa | 0 | (0) |
| 2018–2019 | → Pontedera (loan) | 13 | (0) |
| 2019– | Pontedera | 22 | (6) |
| 2020–2021 | → Avellino (loan) | 7 | (0) |
| 2021 | → Potenza (loan) | 11 | (0) |
| 2021–2022 | Potenza | 9 | (0) |
| 2022 | → Grosseto (loan) | 16 | (1) |
| 2022–2023 | Livorno | 22 | (4) |
| 2023–2025 | Tau Calcio Altopascio | 61 | (6) |
| 2025– | SC Ligorna 1922 | 20 | (1) |
- * Club domestic league appearances and goals as of 25 Juny 2026

Michele Bruzzo (born 26 June 1999) is an Italian footballer who plays as a midfielder for Serie D club SC Ligorna 1922.

== Club career ==
=== Genoa ===
Born in Genoa, Bruzzo is a youth exponent of Genoa.

==== Loan to Pontedera ====
On 17 July 2018, Bruzzo joined Serie C club Pontedera on loan for the 2018–19 season. On 29 July he made his professional debut as a substitute replacing Nicolas La Vigna in the 98th minute of a match loss at 4–2 at penalties after a 1–1 draw in the first round of Coppa Italia against Ternana. He made his Serie C debut for the club on 15 October in a game against Arezzo, as a 70th-minute substitute for Filippo Serena. Six days later, on 21 October, he played his first entire match, a 0–0 away draw against Pro Vercelli. Bruzzo ended his season-long loan to Pontedera with 14 appearances, only four as a starter.

=== Pontedera ===
After the loan, on 21 July 2019, Bruzzo joined to Pontedera and he signed a 2-year contract. On 24 August he made his season debut for Pontedera as a substitute replacing Mariano Bernardini in the 90th minute of a 3–1 home win over Carrarese. On 29 September, Bruzzo played his first match as a starter of the season, a 3–1 away win over Giana Erminio, he was replaced by Jacopo Giuliani in the 67th minute. On 14 October he scored his first professional goal for the club in the 56th minute of a 2–1 home win over Pistoiese. On 24 November he scored his second goal, as a substitute, in the 79th minute of a 1–0 away win over Robur Siena. On 12 January 2020, Bruzzo was sent-off with a double yellow card in the 94th minute of a 2–1 home win over Renate.

==== Loan to Avellino and Potenza ====
On 26 August 2020, Bruzzo was loaned to Serie C side Avellino on a season-long loan deal with the option to buy. On 23 September he made his debut for the club as a starter in a 2–1 away defeat against Renate in the first round of Coppa Italia, he was replaced by Gabriele Bernardotto in the 55th minute. Ten days later, on 3 October, he made his league debut for the club as a substitute replacing Alberto De Francesco for the last 4 minutes of a 2–1 away win over Viterbese Castrense. On 2 December, Bruzzo played his first match as a starter in the league for the club, a 1–0 away win over Potenza Calcio, he was replaced by Riccardo Burgio in the 79th minute. However his loan was interrupted in January 2021 and he left the club with only 8 appearances, including 3 as a starter.

On 30 January 2021, Bruzzo was signed by Potenza until the end of the season. Three days later, on 3 February he made his debut for the club as a substitute replacing Giovanni Volpe in the 64th minute of a 1–0 away defeat against Casertana. One month later, on 2 March, Bruzzo played his first match as a starter for Potenza in a 2–1 home win over Turris, he was replaced by Mattia Sandri after 59 minutes. On 31 March he played his first entire match for the club, a 2–0 away win over Cavese. Bruzzo ended his 6-months loan to Potenza with 11 appearances, 5 of them as a starter.

=== Potenza ===
==== Loan to Grosseto ====
On 29 January 2022, Bruzzo joined Grosseto on loan until the end of the season.

== Career statistics ==
=== Club ===
As of 24 May 2021

| Club | Season | League | | | Cup | | Europe | | Other | | Total | |
| Club | Season | League | Apps | Goals | Apps | Goals | Apps | Goals | Apps | Goals | Apps | Goals |
|---|---|---|---|---|---|---|---|---|---|---|---|---|
| Pontedera (loan) | 2018–19 | Serie C | 13 | 0 | 1 | 0 | — | | — | | 14 | 0 |
| Pontedera | 2019–20 | Serie C | 22 | 6 | 0 | 0 | — | | — | | 22 | 6 |
| Avellino (loan) | 2020–21 | Serie C | 7 | 0 | 1 | 0 | — | | — | | 8 | 0 |
| Potenza (loan) | 2020–21 | Serie C | 11 | 0 | — | | — | | — | | 11 | 0 |
| Career total | | | 53 | 6 | 2 | 0 | — | | — | | 55 | 6 |
