= Alessio Sestu =

Italian footballer (born 1983)

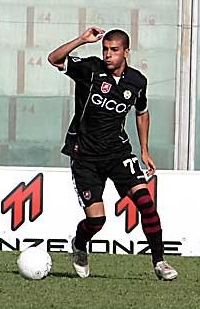

Personal information
- Full name: Alessio Sestu
- Date of birth: 29 September 1983 (age 43)
- Place of birth: Rome, Italy
- Height: 1.79 m (5 ft 10 1/2 in)
- Position: Midfielder

Team information
- Current team: Piacenza (sporting director)

Youth career
- Lazio
- 2001–2002: → Sora (loan)
- 2002–2003: Modena

Senior career*
Years	Team	Apps	(Gls)
2003–2007	Treviso	1	(0)
2003–2004	→ Südtirol (loan)	15	(0)
2005–2006	→ Cittadella (loan)	35	(4)
2006	→ Mantova (loan)	7	(0)
2006–2007	→ Salernitana (loan)	30	(8)
2007–2009	Avellino	39	(1)
2008–2009	→ Reggina (loan)	17	(1)
2009–2010	Vicenza	15	(1)
2010	→ Bari (loan)	3	(0)
2010–2013	Siena	63	(5)
2013–2018	Chievo	12	(0)
2014	→ Sampdoria (loan)	2	(0)
2014–2015	→ Brescia (loan)	33	(5)
2015–2016	→ Virtus Entella (loan)	32	(1)
2016–2018	→ Alessandria (loan)	53	(3)
2018–2020	Piacenza	56	(2)
2020–2022	Portogruaro		
- * Club domestic league appearances and goals

Alessio Sestu (born 29 September 1983) is an Italian football executive and former player, currently in charge as the sporting director of Piacenza.

== Career ==
=== Treviso ===
Born in Rome, Lazio region, Sestu started his career at one of the two Serie A club in the capital – Lazio. In July 2002 Sestu joined Modena, but in January 2003 left for Treviso Sestu was sold to Serie C2 club Südtirol in co-ownership deal in summer 2003. In June 2004 Treviso bought back Sestu through sealed bid submitted to Lega Calcio. He then played for clubs in Serie B and Serie C1 in temporary deals, since January 2005. He became a regular for Avellino in Serie B 2007–08, made him signed by Reggina on 28 August 2008. Previously in June 2008 Avellino signed him from Treviso in co-ownership deal for €400,000 and Reggina bought the remain half of the registration rights from Treviso.

=== Reggina ===
As a new signing of Reggina, Sestu made his Serie A debut on 14 September 2008 against Torino. He also played twice at 2008–09 Coppa Italia. In June 2009 Avellino bought Reggina's half but the club then went bankrupt, made Sestu became free agent.

=== Vicenza ===
On 1 September 2009, Sestu was moved to Vicenza on free transfer. On 1 February 2010, he signed a loan by Bari for the rest of the season.

=== Siena ===
In August 2010 Sestu left for Siena in co-ownership deal for €525,000 in 3-year contract, made Vicenza had a profit of €1.05 million (as it was presumed another 50% registration rights was sold for the same price). In June 2011 Siena acquired outright for another pre-agreed €525,000, and Vicenza got half of the registration rights of Domenico Danti tagged for €425,000, made Siena only paid €100,000 cash to Vicenza.

=== Chievo ===
On 11 July 2013 Sestu was signed by A.C. ChievoVerona on a free transfer.

On 31 January 2014, he joined Sampdoria on a loan deal. On 1 September 2014 Sestu was signed by Serie B club Brescia Calcio, with Mario Gargiulo moved to Verona.

== Retirement and later career ==
In December 2020, Sestu signed for Eccellenza club Portogruaro. In June 2022, Sestu retired and was hired as sporting director for Portogruaro.

On 4 July 2023, Sestu was hired as the new sporting director of Serie D club Piacenza.

== Personal life ==
His parent were from the island of Sardinia.
