= Jesús Portillo =

Argentine footballer

Personal information
- Date of birth: 16 June 1999 (age 27)
- Place of birth: Argentina
- Position: Forward

Team information
- Current team: Defensores Unidos

Senior career*
Years	Team	Apps	(Gls)
2018–	Defensores Unidos	23	(0)
- * Club domestic league appearances and goals as of 17:06, 19 May 2019 (UTC)

Jesús Portillo (born 16 June 1999) is an Argentine professional footballer who plays as a forward for Defensores Unidos.

== Career ==
Portillo got his career underway with Defensores Unidos. He began featuring at senior level in the 2018–19 campaign, making his professional debut on 5 August 2018 in a Copa Argentina defeat to Newell's Old Boys; playing for sixty-six minutes before being substituted for Gianluca Alfenoni. His league bow arrived in August versus Estudiantes as a substitute, though his opening Primera B Metropolitana start didn't arrive until the succeeding December; against Acassuso.

== Career statistics ==
As of 19 May 2019.

Appearances and goals by club, season and competition
Club	Season	League			Cup		League Cup		Continental		Other		Total	
Club	Season	Division	Apps	Goals	Apps	Goals	Apps	Goals	Apps	Goals	Apps	Goals	Apps	Goals
Defensores Unidos	2018–19	Primera B Metropolitana	23	0	1	0	—		—		0	0	24	0
Career total			23	0	1	0	—		—		0	0	24	0
