= Daniel Peluffo-Wiese =

Footballer (born 2003)

Personal information
- Full name: Daniel Peluffo-Wiese
- Date of birth: 19 April 2003 (age 23)
- Place of birth: Miami Beach, Florida, United States
- Height: 2.01 m (6 ft 7 in)
- Position: Goalkeeper

Team information
- Current team: Penn State Nittany Lions

Youth career
- 2016–2018: Weston
- 2018–2019: New York Red Bulls
- 2019–2022: SpVgg Unterhaching

College career
Years	Team	Apps	(Gls)
2026–	Penn State Nittany Lions	0	(0)

Senior career*
Years	Team	Apps	(Gls)
2022–2023	Türkgücü München	0	(0)
2023–2024	Livorno	0	(0)
2024–2025	Albion	0	(0)

International career
2022	Uruguay U20	3	(0)
- * Club domestic league appearances and goals as of 1 June 2026

Daniel Peluffo-Wiese (born 19 April 2003) is a footballer who plays as a goalkeeper for Penn State Nittany Lions. Born in the United States, he has represented Uruguay at youth international level.

== Club career ==
Peluffo-Wiese began his youth career at Cyclone Miami and Weston FC before joining the youth academy of New York Red Bulls in 2018. He moved to Germany in 2019 by signing for SpVgg Unterhaching. On 15 June 2022, Türkgücü München announced the signing of Peluffo-Wiese on a one-year contract.

On 5 August 2023, Peluffo-Wiese joined Serie D club Livorno. On 31 January 2024, he joined Uruguayan club Albion. On 1 May 2026, he joined USL League Two club Lubbock Matadors for the 2026 season.

== International career ==
Born in the United States, Peluffo-Wiese chose to play for his father's country Uruguay at international level. He made his debut for the Uruguay under-20 team on 6 September 2022 in a 3–1 friendly win against Uzbekistan. In October 2022, he was named in Uruguay's squad for the 2022 South American Games. He played two matches in the tournament as Uruguay eventually finished fourth after reaching the semi-finals.

== Personal life ==
Peluffo-Wiese was born in the United States to a Uruguayan father and a German mother, thus making him eligible to represent all three countries. He is a fan of Premier League club Arsenal. He considers Manuel Neuer and Thibaut Courtois as his role models when it comes to his playing position.

== Career statistics ==
As of 2 May 2026

Appearances and goals by club, season and competition
Club	Season	League			National cup		Other		Total	
Club	Season	Division	Apps	Goals	Apps	Goals	Apps	Goals	Apps	Goals
Türkgücü München	2022–23	Regionalliga Bayern	0	0	—		0	0	0	0
Livorno	2023–24	Serie D	0	0	—		0	0	0	0
Albion	2024	USD	0	0	0	0	—		0	0
Albion	2025	USD	0	0	0	0	—		0	0
Albion	Total		0	0	0	0	0	0	0	0
Lubbock Matadors	2026	USL League Two	0	0	—		—		0	0
Career total			0	0	0	0	0	0	0	0

== Honours ==
Albion

- Uruguayan Segunda División: 2025
