= Agustín Medina (footballer, born 1999) =

Argentine footballer (born 1999)

Personal information
- Full name: Laureano Agustín Medina
- Date of birth: 11 July 1999 (age 27)
- Place of birth: Argentina
- Position: Forward

Team information
- Current team: Defensores Unidos

Youth career
- Defensores Unidos

Senior career*
| Years | Team | Apps | (Gls) |
| 2019 | Defensores Unidos | 3 | (0) |
- * Club domestic league appearances and goals as of 19:59, 5 August 2026 (UTC)

Laureano Agustín Medina (born 11 July 1999) is an Argentine professional footballer who played as a forward for Defensores Unidos.

== Career ==
Medina is a product of the youth system of Defensores Unidos. He made the breakthrough into the Primera B Metropolitana club's first-team squad towards the end of 2018–19, appearing for his professional debut on 28 April 2019 during a 1–1 draw at home to Deportivo Español; replacing Jesús Portillo for the final moments.

== Career statistics ==
As of 19 May 2019.

Appearances and goals by club, season and competition
| Club | Season | League | | | Cup | | League Cup | | Continental | | Other | | Total | |
| Club | Season | Division | Apps | Goals | Apps | Goals | Apps | Goals | Apps | Goals | Apps | Goals | Apps | Goals |
|---|---|---|---|---|---|---|---|---|---|---|---|---|---|---|
| Defensores Unidos | 2018–19 | Primera B Metropolitana | 2 | 0 | 0 | 0 | — | | — | | 0 | 0 | 2 | 0 |
| Career total | | | 2 | 0 | 0 | 0 | — | | — | | 0 | 0 | 2 | 0 |
