= Francesco Giuffrè =

Francesco Giuffrè (born March 25, 1972) screenwriter and theatre director.

== Theatre director ==
- 2006 "Il Profumo" by Patrick Süskind, Teatro Argot in Rome.
- 2007 "Cuore di cane" by Mikhail Bulgakov, Teatro Argot in Rome
- 2008 "Othellow" by William Shakespeare, Teatro Argot, in Rome
- 2010 "Hell - un'altra storia del moro di Venezia", inspired by William Shakespeare, Teatro Piccolo Eliseo, in Rome , original music by Andrea Amendola
- 2010 "Crime and Punishment, by Fyodor Dostoyevsky, Teatro Argot in Rome. , original music composed by Gianluca Attanasio
- 2011 "Crime and Punishment", by Fyodor Dostoyevsky. Teatro Argot in Rome. Original music composed by Gianluca Attanasio
- 2012 "1984" da G. Orwell. Teatro Argot di Roma
- 2015/2016 "La lista di Schindler. Con Carlo Giuffrè. Produzione DIANA ORIS. Teatro Piccolo Eliseo di Roma e tournée.
- 2017/2018 "Le notti bianche" da F. Dostoevskji. Produzione Teatro Ghione. Con Giorgio Marchesi e Camilla Diana.
- 2019 "Così è (se vi pare) Di L. Pirandello. Produzione Teatro Ghione. Con Riccardo Polizzy Carbonelli.

== Cinema ==
- 2023 "Amleto è mio fratello" regia e sceneggiatura. Con Andrea De Dominicis, Carlo Di Bartolomeo, Paolo Giliberti, Paolo Vaselli, Margherita Buy, Nino Frassica, Claudia Gerini, Vincenzo Salemme.
