= Baldini & Castoldi =

Italian publishing house founded in 1897

Baldini+Castoldi
- Industry: Media
- Founded: 1897 (Milan, Kingdom of Italy)
- Founder: Ettore Baldini, Antenore Castoldi, Alceste Borella, Gian Pietro Lucini
- Headquarters: Milan, Lombardy, Italy
- Key people: Elisabetta Sgarbi (president and director general)
- Products: Publishing of books
- Services: Bookshops
- Website: baldinicastoldi.it

Baldini + Castoldi, formerly known as Baldini Castoldi Dalai Editore until 2018, is an Italian publishing house founded in 1897 as Baldini & Castoldi. It changed its name to Dalai Editore in 2011, and Baldini & Castoldi became a series of Dalai Editore. The company has published several successful authors and is located under the arcades of Galleria Vittorio Emanuele in Milan.

== Foundation ==
Founder members were Ettore Baldini, Antenore Castoldi, Alceste Borella, and the poet Gian Pietro Lucini, who had acquired the small publishing house Galli and Omodei and then renamed it as Baldini & Castoldi. At its foundation in 1897, it had a registered capital of 60,000 Italian lire. Among the first successful authors, there were Antonio Fogazzaro, Gerolamo Rovetta, Neera (Anna Zuccari), Salvator Gotta, and Guido da Verona; da Verona in particular was the most commercially successful Italian writer between 1914 and 1939.

== History ==
=== 20th century ===
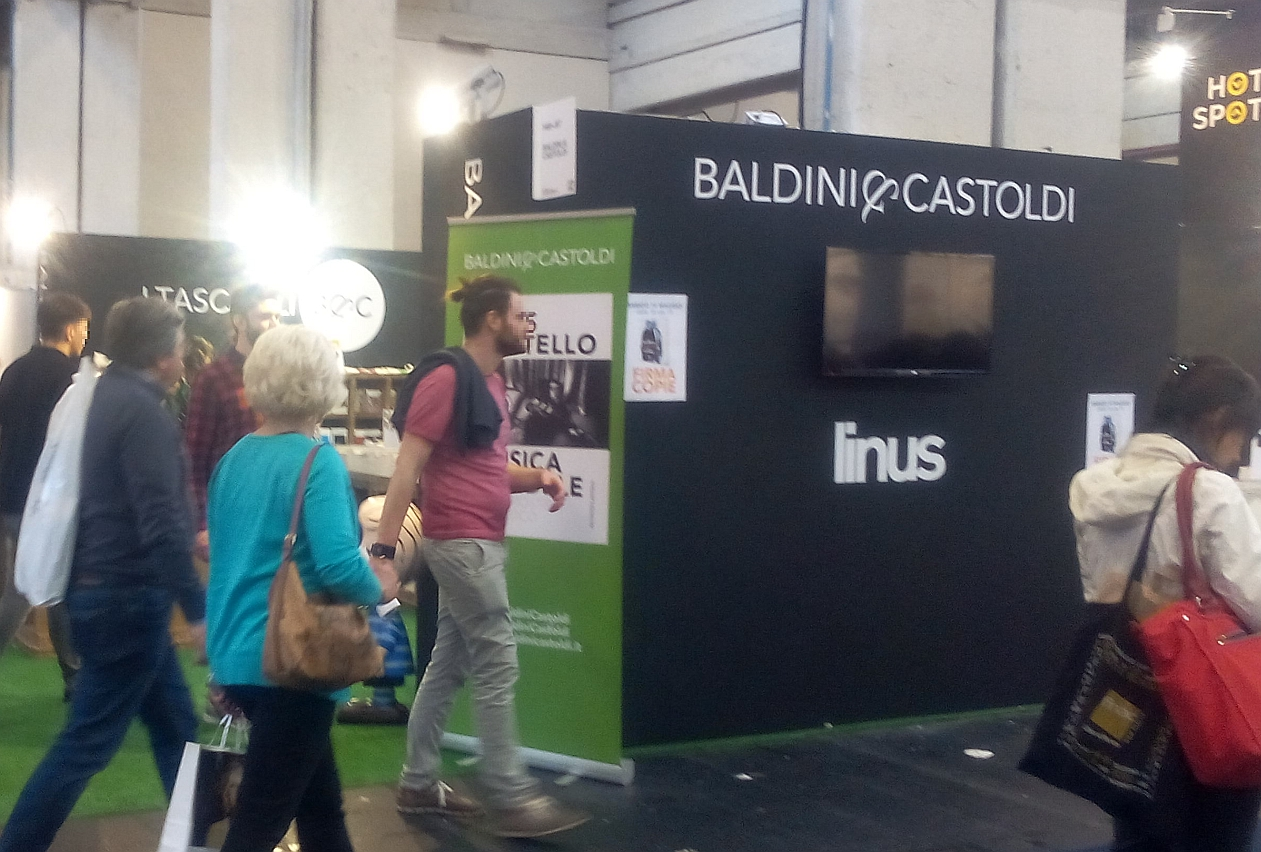
Baldini & Castoldi stand at the 2016 Turin International Book Fair

In 1940, the management was renewed with the arrival of Enrico Castoldi, who opened more to the presence in the catalog of foreign authors, especially Hungarian. It established itself during the 1950s and 1960s, particularly in the literary sector. A descent of sales took the publisher to suspend its activities in 1970.

In 1991, the publishing house was taken by Alessandro Dalai, who bought the shares owned by the publishing group Elemond, and Oreste del Buono. The publishing house offered numerous book series focused on fiction, nonfiction, history, economy, humor, and satire (with the Le formiche series). An important part of their publications was reserved to debuts and emerging writers. A key role in the revitalization of the brand was given by the success of the humorous books by Gino and Michele and then by Va dove ti porta il cuore, a novel written by Susanna Tamaro which became in a short time an international bestseller. According to a 1997 report made on the occasion of the centenary of Baldini & Castoldi, after Dalai's relaunch, the publishing house had 25 employees, an income between 35 and 40 billion lire a year and published about 150 books a year.

=== 21st century ===
In July 2000, Dalai completed the acquisition of the publishing house pointing out the shares owned by the Mondadori Group (since 1994), adding his name to the brand of the publisher. In 2004, Dalai appealed to the sentence ruling that Gianni Brera's works belong to Brera's heirs, who felt that Dalai Editori was stopping from being published; Dalai also stated that Baldini Castoldi Dalai had published fourteen Brera's works and intended to publish further.

Into the 2010s, Baldini & Castoldi became one of the most important Italian independent publishers. In 2011, the company changed its name to Dalai Editore and Baldini & Castoldi became a series of Dalai Editore, which closed down in 2014; Dalai was acquitted of all charges, including fraudolent bankruptcy, in December 2023. The publisher was revived through to the effort of a new publishing house, simply named Baldini & Castoldi. In 2018, it was renamed Baldini + Castoldi.

== Published authors ==
Some of the publisher's most successful authors include Enrico Brizzi, Giorgio Faletti, Fabio Geda, Gianluca Arrighi, Antonio Pennacchi, Aldo Busi, and since 1993 also Paolo Mereghetti with his Dictionary of the Film.

== See also ==
- List of Italian companies

== Bibliography ==
Books

- Abbà, Anna; Archinto, Francesca (2000). Quo vadis libro? Interviste sull'editoria italiana in tempo di crisi (in Italian). Milan: EDUCatt. ISBN 978-8883116803.
- "Baldini & Castoldi". Enciclopedia Treccani Tre Volumi (in Italian). Rome: Italian Encyclopedia Institute. 2009.
- "Baldini & Castoldi". Enciclopedia Treccani (in Italian). Rome: Italian Encyclopedia Institute. 2018 – via Treccani.
- De Berti, Raffaele (2000). Dallo schermo alla carta (in Italian). Milan: Vita e Pensiero. ISBN 8834306368.
- Di Stefano, Paolo (18 August 2011). Potresti anche dirmi grazie. Gli scrittori raccontati dagli editori (in Italian). Milan: Rizzoli. ISBN 978-8858600597.
- Gigli Marchetti, Ada (1997). Stampa e piccola editoria tra le due guerre (in Italian). Milan: F. Angeli. ISBN 9788846403476.

News articles

- Altarocca, Claudio (4 December 1997). "Baldini & Castoldi, cent'anni". La Stampa (in Italian). p. 1. ISSN 1122-1763.
- "Arte tipografica". La fabbrica del libro (in Italian). No. 2. 1996.
- "Il fatto non sussiste Assolto da tutte le accuse Alessandro Dalai, l'ex editore di Baldini e Castoldi". Linkiesta (in Italian). 21 December 2023.
- "Baldini & Castoldi, nuovi talenti addio (forse resta la Tamaro)". La Stampa (in Italian). 4 December 1999. p. 11. ISSN 1122-1763.
- Genta, Luciano (19 October 1991). "Dalai: così rifaccio la Baldini & Castoldi". La Stampa (in Italian). p. 7. ISSN 1122-1763.
- Gianola, Rinaldo (12 April 1997). "Va a majority of the Dalai Baldini & Castoldi". La Repubblica (in Italian). ISSN 0390-1076.
- Messina, Dino (10 April 1995). "Il mio regno per una formica". Corriere della Sera (in Italian). p. 31. ISSN 1120-4982.
- Mosca, Simone (5 February 2013). "Un quadro e cento libri per ricordare Baldini". La Repubblica (in Italian). ISSN 0390-1076.
- Sciandivaschi, Simonetta (3 March 2024). "Alessandro Dalai: 'L'editoria mi ha tolto tutto'". La Stampa (in Italian). ISSN 1122-1763.
- "Scrittori: Baldini Castoldi ricorrera' in Appello per brera" (in Italian). Adnkronos. 4 February 2004.
- Tornabuoni, Lietta (8 June 1995). "Dalai, Il cacciatore di bestsellers". La Stampa (in Italian). p. 15. ISSN 1122-1763.
