= Filippo Artioli =

Italian football player

Personal information
- Date of birth: 25 January 1998 (age 28)
- Place of birth: Ferrara, Italy
- Height: 1.81 m (5 ft 11 in)
- Position: Midfielder

Team information
- Current team: Treviso
- Number: 19

Youth career
- –2016: Fiorentina
- 2016–2018: SPAL

Senior career*
Years	Team	Apps	(Gls)
2018–2019	SPAL	0	(0)
2018–2019	→ Viterbese Castrense (loan)	7	(0)
2019–2020	Imolese	2	(0)
2020–2021	Mezzolara	29	(3)
2021–2022	Aglianese	36	(4)
2022–2023	Dolomiti Bellunesi	33	(8)
2023–2024	Piacenza	36	(0)
2024–	Treviso	62	(6)
- * Club domestic league appearances and goals as of 30 June 2026

Filippo Artioli (born 25 January 1998) is an Italian football player who plays for Serie C Group A club Treviso.

== Club career ==
=== SPAL ===
On 11 July 2018, he joined Serie C club Viterbese Castrense on loan. He made his Serie C debut for Viterbese Castrense on 5 December 2018 in a game against Bisceglie, as a 79th-minute substitute for Bismark Ngissah.

=== Imolese ===
On 17 July 2019, he signed a 1-year contract with Serie C club Imolese.

=== Mezzolara ===
On 31 August 2020 he joined Mezzolara.
