= Gianluca Ramazzotti =

Italian television and theater actor

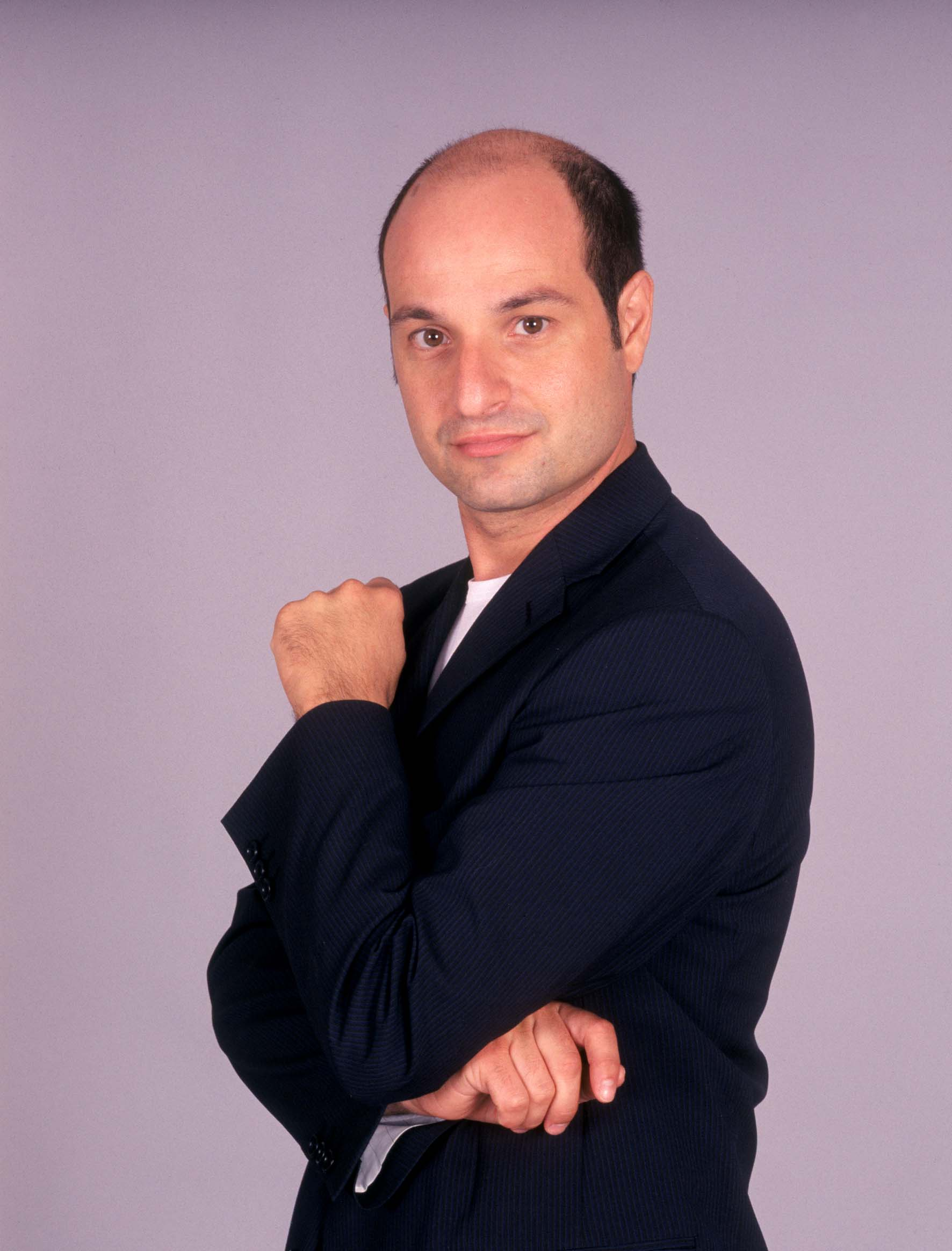
- Born: 22 August 1970 (age 55); Rome, Italy
- Occupations: actor, character actor

Gianluca Ramazzotti (born 22 August 1970) is an Italian television and theater actor.

== Biography ==
He has attended the academy of Theater of Calabria, followed by other courses at Warsaw Theater, and in Paris at the Theatre du Soleil. It entered the Company of the Bagaglino, directed by Pier Francesco Pingitore, participating both to shows and to fiction series produced by the company.

Besides the experience of the Bagaglino, he played in the series Vivere and Un posto al sole, and in the television film Il Papa Buono, by Ricky Tognazzi.

He works also as radio host and dubber, in particular in the early-morning radiofictions of Radiodue.

As theater actor, he has interpreted the role of Bojetto in the musical comedy Rugantino.

He speaks fluently French, English and Spanish.

== Filmography ==
=== Theater ===
- I Promessi Sposi un musical
- Intrichi d’amore
- La scuola delle mogli
- Soldati a Inglostadt
- Ifigenia in Aulide
- A qualcuno piace caldo
- La notte
- Il gatto che scoprì l’America
- La farina del diavolo
- Scanzonatissimo Gran Casinò
- Babbo Natale è uno Stronzo…
- Dark! Tornerò prima di mezzanotte
- Il Vantone
- Lei
- I tre processi
- E Ballando Ballando
- Il Decamerone
- Il re muore
- Rugantino
- Se devi dire una bugia dilla grossa
- Cyrano
- Boeing-Boeing
- Romolo & Remolo
- La Donna in nero
- Destinatario Sconosciuto
- Il giro del mondo in 80 risate
- Sempre meglio che lavorare (one man Show)
- Il Mago di Oz
- Un pezzo di pazzo
- Prime donne alle primarie
- Uomini all’80%
- Va tutto storto!
- E io pago!
- Complici
- Gabbia di matti
- Destinatario sconosciuto (also director)
- Va tutto storto
- Un'ora senza televisione Director. Music by Gianluca Attanasio

=== Television ===
- Vivere
- Un posto al sole
- Anni 60
- Distretto di polizia
- Giornalisti
- La squadra
- Tequila e Bonetti
- Il Papa buono
- Miconsenta
- Con le unghie e con i denti
- Barbecue
- Passaparola
- Domani è un'altra truffa
- Torte in faccia
- Punto e a capo (guest)
- E io pago!
- Edizione Straordinaria (satirical TV news, Demo Mura)
- Seven Show 2007
- Vita da paparazzo
- Gabbia di Matti
