= Gianluca Attanasio =

Italian musician

- Born: Gianluca Attanasio
- Occupations: Musician, composer, singer-songwriter, filmmaker, journalist

Gianluca (John) Attanasio is a British-Italian singer-songwriter, composer, record producer, screenwriter, film director, photographer and journalist.

Specializing in modern piano and composition at "Laboratorio musicale Walter Savelli" in Florence, Attanasio released several CD albums from 1989. These albums were published by several labels, including the Italian "Aliante/Time music" label (Sergio Cammariere), Warner/Chappell Music and EMI music. During the following years he wrote music for dance television and short films, starting international collaborations with Mike Applebaum (Zucchero), Geoff Westley (Lucio Battisti, Riccardo Cocciante, Bee Gees), Renato Serio (Renato Zero), Susanne Hahn, Roberto Guarino (Samuele Bersani, Loredana Bertè), Kathleen Hagen (Mario Biondi), and Walter Savelli (Claudio Baglioni). In theatre, he worked with international stage writers, poets and directors including Peter Colley, Ennio Coltorti, Francesco Giuffrè, Daniele Scattina, Carlo Giuffrè, Gianluca Ramazzotti. In 1998, with other Italian musicians, he opened Claudio Baglioni's concert in the Olympic Stadium of Rome. In 2005 Attanasio created and carried on a musical project "Harmonia" with Aldo and Roberto Gemma brothers and French actress Martin Brochard as a singer.

In 2007 Gianluca won the "Fondi La Pastora" theatre -Award (XXXIIIth edition) received in Rome. Best music for "AK-47", piece by Daniele Scattina and Claudio De Santis. "Last song" is his first short drama film, written by him and Kathleen Hagen. He produced the CD Soul of the ocean with 24 soundtracks and My first secret, a solo piano CD containing "Serenata dal cuore", a song composed for Pope John Paul II's birthday, and performed in front of the Pope in the Sala Nervi (Vatican City). This pièce was played by the Alessandria Classical Orchestra conducted by Mr. Renato Serio. In 2012, Attanasio was invited at the Italian Cultural Institute by UCMF ( Union des Compositeurs de Musique de Film) of Paris to give a masterclass on the relationship between music and images in the films, dance and theater. He worked for Italian National tabloids and international magazines including "Il Tempo", "Il Giornale", "Rockstar", "Metal Shock", "Private Photo Review", specializing in music and teatre criticism.

== Discography ==
- 1994: In fondo al blu (Warner/Chappell)
- 1997: In questo universo (Aliante/Time music)
- 1998: Balla con me (Aliante/Time music)
- 2005: La vie continue. Martine Brochard as singer
- 1999: Stasera sono spento (Aliante/Time music)
- 2007 Soul of the ocean (Soundtracks)
- 2007: My first secret (piano solo album)
- 2010: "Sorry" (Rossodisera/EMI MUSIC) produced by Raffaele Festa Campanile Carmen Serra as singer
- 2010: "Scusa" (Italian version, Rossodisera/ EMI MUSIC) produced by Raffaele Festa Campanile Carmen Serra as Singer
- 2010 "Colors of life", single
- 2010 "Automne", single
- 2010 "Time's memory"
- 2010 "Last song. Sofia's promise"
- 2012 "One day I'll be happy"
- 2014 "La lista di Schindler" (Original Theatre Score), album
- 2018 "Go fuck yourself" (single)
- 2018 "Snow covered your scars" (single)
- 2018 "Sky in the night" (album)
- 2018 "Gianluca Attanasio Demos & Rarities" (album)
- 2018 "Gianluca Attanasio Unplugged 2006. Italian Edition"(album)
- 2019 "Rays of heart", single
- 2019 "Beautiful Darkness", album
- 2019 "Haunted Loves", album
- 2019 "Pyramidal Crisis, Death of The Virgin", album
- 2019 "Chasing The Ghost Planet", album
- 2019 "Emotional Reset – Slow Down Beat", single
- 2019 "Emotional Reset – Flying in the Sky", single
- 2020 "Beyond2Doors" - Album

== Theatre and film director ==
- 2003: "Posteggio o non posteggio, per i soldi è un gran magheggio". Teatro petrolini in Rome
- 2007: "La casa di nuvole, luoghi immaginari ma possibili. Forse una favola". Attanasio as composer, actor and pianist.
- 2010: "Last song: Sofia's promise" with Goffredo Maria Bruno , Riccardo Mei , Glenda Canino.
- 2011: "Anche i cani hanno un'anima" video-interview with Franca Valeri
- 2011: "One day I'll be happy". Short movie
- 2012: "No regrets". Short movie
- 2012: "Rovine" Short movie
- 2012: "Le parfum de la vie" . Short movie with Mauro Mascitti and Pino Piggianelli
- 2024: "Bar", with Gianluca John Attanasio, Gloria Cagnetti, Mattia Spalletta

== Music for Theatre ==
- 2003: Romeo and Juliet by Daniele Scattina
- 2006: AK-47 by Daniele Scattina
- 2009: La neve era sporca, directed by Daniele Scattina
- 2009: Napoleone e... il generale by Soisiz Moreau, directed by Gianluca Ramazzotti and Mauro Mandolini
- 2009: 2012– L’attesa by Goffredo Maria Bruno
- 2009: "2.24" by Pascual Carbonell & Jerónimo Cornelles
- 2009: "Un’ora senza televisione" written by Jame Salom and directed by Gianluca Ramazzotti. With Patrizia Pellegrino and Ennio Coltorti
- 2009: "Un lungo applauso", written and directed by Mauro Mandolini
- 2010: Crime and Punishment written by Fyodor Dostoyevsky and directed by Francesco Giuffrè
- 2011: Crime and Punishment written by Fyodor Dostoyevsky and directed by Francesco Giuffrè
- 2011: "Ritratto di Sartre da giovane". Music adaptation
- 2011: "Tornerò prima di mezzanotte", written by Peter Colley. Directed by Gianluca Ramazzotti, with Gianluca Ramazzotti, Miriam Mesturino, Roberto Mantovani, Daniela Scarlatti. Teatro Erba, Turin.
- 2011: "2.24" written by Pascual Carbonell & Jerónimo Cornelles. Directed by Gianluca Ramazzotti, with Mauro Mandolini, Veruska Rossi, Elisa d'Eusanio. Teatro dell'Orologio, Rome.
- 2014: "LA lista di Schindler", with Carlo Giuffrè. Teatro Eliseo in Rome
- 2018: "A message from Mars". Live soundtrack, Teatro in Scatola, Rome
- 2024: "Clown". Live soundtrack. Teatro Anfitrione, Rome
- 2024: "Bar". Teatro AR-Ma, Rome

== Music for Dance ==
- 2003: "Romeo e Giulietta". Choreography by Andrea Cagnetti. Teatro Vascello and Teatro Greco in Rome.
- 2004: "Serenate from the heart". Choreography by Andrea Cagnetti. Vatican City
- 2004: "Il walzer della vita". Choreography by Andrea Cagnetti (Rome)
- 2004: "Paisaje interno". Choreography by Paula Rosolen. Teatro Greco in Rome
- 2004: "Skean Deep". Choreography by Andrea Cagnetti. Teatro Don Luigi Orione in Rome
- 2004: "Merry Christmas Peter Pan". Choreography by Arsmovendi. Gran Teatro in Rome
- 2006: "Colora una vita". Choreography by Arsmevendi. Teatro Greco in Rome
- 2012: Earth. Choreography by Andrea Cagnetti, Fran Spector Atkins
- 2012: Night of the toys, Choreography by Spectordance . Monterey, California

== Film music ==
- 2010 "Last song: Sofia's promise" Gianluca Attanasio at IMDb
- 2010 "Drake diamond", produced and directed by Clyde Lucas ( pre-production)
- 2011 "One day I'll be happy"
- 2012 "Something to remember", directed by Ken Gregg
- 2012 "Rovine"
- 2012 "No regrets"
- 2019 "Lefferts Cross", directed by Ed "Bo" Davis

== Television spot ==
- 2011 "Cantina Todini", MEDIASET NETWORK with the actress Patrizia Pellegrino
- 2019 "Third edition of Castelli Romani Film Festival"
