= Alessandro Cesarini (footballer) =

Italian footballer (born 1989)

Personal information
- Date of birth: 19 June 1989 (age 37)
- Place of birth: La Spezia, Italy
- Height: 1.78 m (5 ft 10 in)
- Position: Forward

Youth career
- –2006: Spezia

Senior career*
Years	Team	Apps	(Gls)
2006–2010	Sarzanese	75	(21)
2010–2013	Spezia	40	(6)
2011–2012	→ Viareggio (loan)	32	(6)
2012–2013	→ Sorrento (loan)	9	(1)
2013	→ Prato (loan)	9	(1)
2013–2014	Savona	28	(10)
2014–2016	Pavia	66	(24)
2016–2018	Reggiana	63	(20)
2018–2020	Robur Siena	32	(7)
2020–2021	Pistoiese	15	(3)
2021	→ Piacenza (loan)	14	(4)
2021–2023	Piacenza	57	(19)
2023–2024	Livorno	16	(5)
2024–2026	USD Fezzanese		
- * Club domestic league appearances and goals as of 11 October 2026

Alessandro Cesarini (born 19 June 1989), is an Italian footballer who plays as a forward.

== Club career ==
Born in La Spezia, Liguria, Cesarini started his senior career at Serie D club Sarzanese, a minor team in the Province of La Spezia. He was the member of Serie D representative team for 2010 Torneo di Viareggio. However Cesarini, along with Daniele Bernasconi were no longer eligible after they had signed by professional teams that month.

=== Spezia ===
On 20 January 2010 he was signed by Spezia, where he finished as the runner-up of the four division. The signing of Cesarini had cost Spezia €45,000. On 10 July 2010 Cesarini signed a new 4-year contract. On 29 August 2011 he was loaned to Viareggio. Cesarini only played once for Spezia in 2011–12 season in the first round of the cup, which Spezia was the champion of the third division as well as the champion of the Lega Pro cup.

Cesarini was not assigned any shirt number for 2012–13 Serie B. On 31 August 2012 Cesarini was loaned to Sorrento. On 31 January 2013 Cesarini and Alessandro Di Dio were signed by Prato., with Petar Kostadinović moved to opposite direction in temporary deal via Nocerina. Cesarini was released by Spezia on 28 August 2013. Cesarini was already linked to Savona on 24 July. Cesarini was also not assigned any shirt number for Spezia in 2013–14 Serie B.

=== Savona ===
On 26 August 2013 Ligurian club Savona announced the signing of Cesarini on loan from Parma. The club also borrowed several players from Parma, namely Alessio Aracu, Cristiano Spirito, Manuel La Rosa, Giordano Maccarone, Matteo Gaudiano, Alberto Ricter, Gioele Sterlicchio, Alberto Giuliatto, Alberto Galuppo and Gabriele Puccio, On 30 January 2014 Savona acquired half of the registration rights of Cesarini from Parma. In the same window Savona also signed half of the rights of Raffaele Rosato.

=== Pavia ===
In summer 2014 Cesarini was signed by Pavia.

=== Reggiana ===
On 18 August 2016 Cesarini signed a contract with Reggiana.

=== Pistoiese ===
On 7 September 2020 he joined Pistoiese on a 2-year contract. On 1 February 2021, he was loaned to Piacenza.

=== Piacenza ===
On 21 July 2021, he signed with Piacenza.

== Personal career ==
Cesarini is called Il Mago (The Wizard) by his fans because he is a very technical and skiller player.
