= Simone Greselin =

Italian footballer

Personal information
- Date of birth: 5 June 1998 (age 28)
- Place of birth: Cernusco sul Naviglio, Italy
- Height: 1.86 m (6 ft 1 in)
- Position: Midfielder

Team information
- Current team: Forlì
- Number: 26

Youth career
- –2016: Varese

Senior career*
Years	Team	Apps	(Gls)
2016–2018	Giana Erminio	42	(1)
2018–2019	Lucchese	28	(0)
2019–2021	Giana Erminio	30	(2)
2021–2022	Rimini	33	(6)
2022	Vastese	15	(2)
2022–2023	Livorno	14	(0)
2023–	Forlì	17	(4)
- * Club domestic league appearances and goals as of 20 December 2023

Simone Greselin (born 5 June 1998) is an Italian football player who plays as a midfielder for Serie D club Forlì.

== Club career ==
=== Giana Erminio ===
On 9 January 2016, Greselin made his professional debut in Serie C for Giana Erminio as a substitute replacing Simone Perico in the 76th minute of a 2–1 home defeat against Pordenone. On 8 May, Greselin played his first match as a starter, a 3–1 away defeat against Pordenone, he was replaced by Marco Costa in the 69th minute. On 30 October he scored his first professional goal in the 25th minute of a 3–0 home win over Racing Roma. On 30 December he played his first entire match for Giana Erminio, a 3–2 home defeat against Robur Siena. On 11 May 2018, Greselin scored his second goal, as a substitute, in the 94th minute of a 4–2 away defeat against Piacenza in the Serie C play-off.

=== Return to Giana Erminio ===
He returned to Giana Erminio on 6 December 2019, signing a contract until the end of the 2019–20 season.

=== Rimini ===
On 13 August 2021, he joined to Serie D club Rimini.

== Career statistics ==
=== Club ===
As of match played 3 April 2021

Appearances and goals by club, season and competition
Club	Season	League			National Cup		Other		Total	
Club	Season	Division	Apps	Goals	Apps	Goals	Apps	Goals	Apps	Goals
Giana Erminio	2015–16	Lega Pro	4	0	0	0	1 (Note: Appearance(s) in Coppa Italia Serie C)	0	5	0
Giana Erminio	2016–17	Lega Pro	14	1	0	0	3	1	17	2
Giana Erminio	2017–18	Serie C	23	0	0	0	2 (Note: One appearance and one goal in Serie C Playoffs, one appearance in Coppa Italia Serie C)	1	25	1
Giana Erminio	Total		41	1	0	0	6	2	47	3
Lucchese	2018–19	Serie C	28	0	0	0	1	0	29	0
Giana Erminio	2019–20	Serie C	6	1	0	0	1 (Note: Appearance(s) in Relegation Playoffs)	0	7	1
Giana Erminio	2020–21	Serie C	22	1	0	0	—		22	1
Giana Erminio	Total		28	2	0	0	1	0	29	2
Rimini	2021–22	Serie D	0	0	0	0	0	0	0	0
Career total			97	3	0	0	8	0	105	5
