= Elisabetta Sgarbi =

Italian filmmaker, publisher, and editorial director (born 1956)

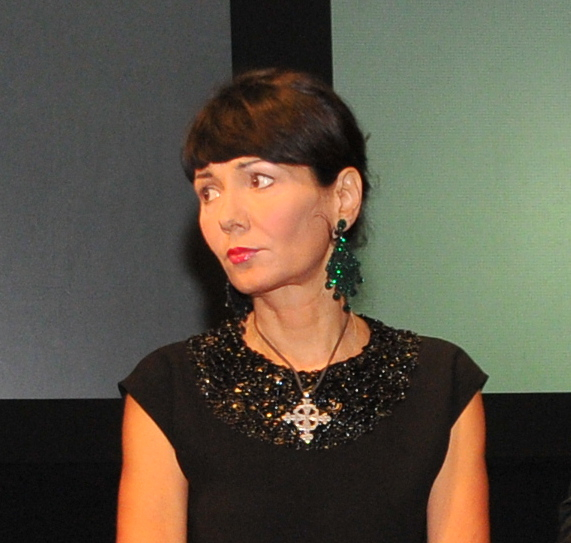
- Sgarbi in 2011
- Born: 9 July 1956 (age 68); Ferrara, Italy
- Occupation(s): Writer, actress, film director, screenwriter, publisher
- Parent(s): Giuseppe Sgarbi (father), Rina Cavallini (mother)
- Relatives: Vittorio Sgarbi (brother)

Elisabetta Sgarbi (born 1956) is an Italian filmmaker, publisher, and editorial director based in Milan.

== Career ==
Sgarbi was born in Ferrara. She is the younger sister of art historian and politician Vittorio Sgarbi. After obtaining a degree in pharmacology, she started working in the communication department of Studio Tesi, a publisher firm. She later worked as editorial director of the publishing house Bompiani for over 25 years. In 2009, she founded the Elisabetta Sgarbi Foundation. In 2015, she co-founded the publishing house La Nave di Teseo with Umberto Eco and Mario Andreose. In 2017, she became the editorial director of Baldini & Castoldi (renamed Baldini+Castoldi in 2018), after La Nave di Teseo acquired the Milan-based publisher.

Sgarbi was the curator of the magazine Panta and of the cultural review La Milanesiana, which she founded in 2000. Since 1999, she has made dozens of films, documentaries, short films, and video clips. Sgarbi's work as filmmaker includes short films and documentaries, including When the Germans Couldn't Swim, For Men Only, Twice Delta, Extraliscio – Dance Punk, and The Ship on the Mountain.

== Documentaries ==
- When the Germans Couldn't Swim (2013)
- For Men Only (2014)
- Twice Delta (2014)
- Where Is the Goldfish? (2015)
- The Language of the Scoundrels – Romanino in Valle Camonica (2016)
- Extraliscio – Punk da balera (2020)

== Short films ==
- Miss Vila's Journey (2012)
- The Ship on the Mountain (2021)
- It Is So (music video of Luca Barbarossa and Extraliscio) (2022)
