= Gianluca Tognon =

Italian scientist and author /born 1976)

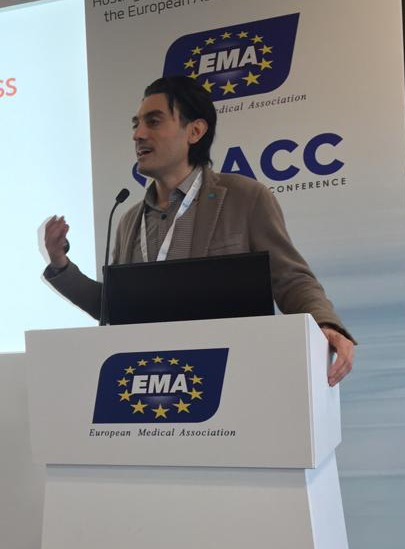
- Born: May 21, 1976 (age 50)
- Occupations: Food scientist, researcher, public health expert, author and speaker.
- Years active: 2000-present

Gianluca Tognon is an Italian food scientist, researcher, public health expert, author and speaker. In 2017 he has founded the consulting company The Food Scientist, which is based in Sweden.

== Education ==
Gianluca Tognon has obtained a degree in Biological Sciences from the University of Pavia in 2000. The title of his dissertation was Effects of the antitumor drug Paclitaxel on human colon cancer. In 2003 he has obtained a specialist degree in Pharmacological research from Regione Lombardia (Italy). In 2005 he has completed a Medical specialty degree in Food science and human nutrition at the University of Pavia. Tognon has also been rewarded with the titles of Advanced speaker and Advanced communicator by the American association Toastmasters Internationals.

== Career ==
Gianluca Tognon started his career in Italy, after the degree in biological sciences at the State University of Pavia. In 2000 he has been granted a fellowship in pharmacology research to work, from September 2000 to September 2003 at the Oncology Department of the “Mario Negri” pharmacological institute in Milan, where he contributed to the testing of two new anticancer drugs (Aplidine and ET-743) developed by the Spanish multinational company Pharma Mar.

During 2004 and 2005 he has worked at the Department of Food Safety of the University of Milan, where he developed a new technique for mycotoxin identification based on the electronic nose.

In November 2005 he joined the Cancer Prevention and Research Institute and worked as researcher in the Epidemiology unit where he worked within two EU projects: the Diogenes (Diet, obesity and genes) and the Idames (Innovative dietary assessment methods for epidemiological studies and public health).

From April 2010 to March 2017 he worked at the Department of Public Health and Community Medicine at the University of Gothenburg (Sweden). He has published several scientific manuscripts on the association between adherence to the Mediterranean diet and longevity as well as chronic disease risk in Swedish and Danish population studies. In addition, his research has also highlighted that milk intake is a risk factor for mortality, whereas cheese and fermented milk intake have the opposite association and he was invited to speak by Harvard university, the Italian multinational company Barilla SpA and European Medical Association. In 2017 Gianluca Tognon founded his own company called The Food Scientist.

=== Teaching ===
Gianluca Tognon has also been active as trainer and university teacher. He has taught at the Master in Global health and at the Master of Public health at Gothenburg university (Sweden), at the Master in Human nutrition at the University of Pavia (Italy) and at the Master in Environmental Law at the University of Bergamo (Italy). He collaborates with the Department of health and education at Skövde Högskola. He has taught on a variety of topics, including:

- Epidemiology, Statistics, SAS/SPSS, main areas: all-cause mortality and chronic disease.
- Nutritional epidemiology, dietary assessment, anthropometry (including body composition).
- Public health, main areas: obesity, malnutrition, diabetes and endocrine disruptors.
- Human nutrition (both children and adults), main areas nutrient biochemistry and clinical nutrition in relation to overweight, dyslipidaemia, diabetes, food allergy, gut problems.

=== Peer-reviewed original papers ===
- Tognon G, Rothenberg E, Petrolo M, Sund V, Lissner L. Dairy product intake and mortality in a cohort of 70 year-old Swedes: a contribution to the Nordic diet discussion. Under review at Eur J Nutr (last revision sent in July 2017).
- Tognon G, Nilsson LM, Shungin D, Lissner L, Jansson JH, Renström F, Wennberg M, Winkvist A, Johansson I. Nonfermented milk and other dairy products: associations with all-cause mortality. Am J Clin Nutr (2017) 105:1502-11.
- González Gil, Tognon G, Lissner L, Intemann T, Pala V, Galli C, Wolters M, Siani A, Veidebaum T, Michels N, Molnar D, Kaprio J, Kourides Y, Fraterman A, Iacoviello L, Picó C, Fernández-Alvira JM, Moreno Aznar LA; IDEFICS Consortium. Prospective associations between dietary patterns and high sensitivity C-reactive protein in European children: the IDEFICS study. Eur J Nutr (2017) doi: 10.1007/s00394-017-1419-x. [Epub ahead of print].
- Gustavsson J, Mehlig K, Leander K, Berg C, Tognon G, Strandhagen E, Björck L, Rosengren A, Lissner L, Nyberg F. FTO gene variation, macronutrient intake and coronary heart disease risk: a gene-diet interaction analysis. Eur J Nutr (2016) 55:247-55.
- Mehlig K, Freyer E, Tognon G, Malmros V, Lissner L, Bosaeus I. Body composition by dualenergy X-ray spectrometry and bioelectrical impedance spectroscopy in a healthy population at age 75 and 80. Clinical Nutrition ESPEN (2015). 10:e26-e32.
- Tognon G, Malmros V, Freyer E, Bosaeus I, Mehlig K. Are segmental MF-BIA scales able to reliably assess fat mass and lean soft tissue in an elderly Swedish population? Exp Gerontol (2015) 72:239-43.
- Tognon G, Moreno LA, Mouratidou T, Veidebaum T, Molnár D, Russo P, Siani A, Akhandaf Y, Krogh V, Tornaritis M, Börnhorst C, Hebestreit A, Pigeot I, Lissner L. Adherence to a Mediterranean-like dietary pattern in children from eight European countries. The IDEFICS

study. Int J Obes (2014) 38:S108–S114.

- Hebestreit A, Börnhorst C, Barba G, Siani A, Huybrechts I, Tognon G, et al. Associations between energy intake, daily food intake and energy density of foods and BMI z-score in 2–9-year-old European children. Eur J Nutr (2014) 53:673-81.
- Tognon G, Lissner L, Sæbye D, Walker KZ, Heitmann BL. The Mediterranean diet in relation to mortality and cardiovascular disease: a Danish cohort study. Br J Nutr (2014) 111:151-9.
- Tognon G, Hebestreit A, Lanfer A, et al. Mediterranean diet, overweight and body composition in children from eight European countries: Cross-sectional and prospective results from the IDEFICS study. Nutr Metab Card Dis (2014) 24:205-13.
- Mehlig K, Leander K, de Faire U, Nyberg F, Berg C, Rosengren A, Björck L, Zetterberg H, Blennow K, Tognon G, Torén K, Strandhagen E, Lissner L, Thelle D. The association between plasma homocysteine and coronary heart disease is modified by the MTHFR 677C>T polymorphism. Heart (2013) 99:1761-5.
- Tognon G, Nilsson LM, Lissner L, Johansson I, Hallmans G, Lindahl B, Winkvist A. The Mediterranean Diet Score and Mortality Are Inversely Associated in Adults Living in the Subarctic Region. J Nutr (2012) 142:1547-53.
- Tognon G, Berg C, Mehlig K, Thelle D, Strandhagen E, Gustavsson J, Rosengren A, Lissner L. (2012). Comparison of Apolipoprotein (apoB/apoA-I) and Lipoprotein (Total 2 Cholesterol/HDL) Ratio Determinants. Focus on Obesity, Diet and Alcohol Intake. PLOS ONE 7(7):e40878.
- Tognon G, Rothenberg E, Eiben G, Sundh V, Winkvist A, Lissner L. Does the Mediterranean diet predict longevity in the elderly? A Swedish perspective. Age (Dordr) (2011) 33: 439–50.
- Illner AK, Harttig U, Tognon G, Palli D, Salvini S, Bower E, Amiano P, Kassik T, Metspalu A, Engeset D, Lund E, Ward H, Slimani N, Bergmann M, Wagner K, Boeing H. Feasibility of innovative dietary assessment in epidemiological studies using the approach of combining different assessment instruments. Public Health Nutr (2011) 14:1055-63.
- Halkjær J, Olsen A, Overvad K, Jakobsen MU, Boeing H, Buijsse B, van der A DL, Du H, Palli D, Tognon G, et al. Intake of total, animal and plant protein and subsequent changes in weight or waist circumference in European men and women: the Diogenes project. Int J Obes (Lond) (2011) 35: 1104–13.
- Buijsse B, Feskens EJ, Schulze MB, Forouhi NG, Wareham NJ, Sharp S, Palli D, Tognon G, et al. Fruit and vegetable intakes and subsequent changes in body weight in European populations: results from the project on Diet, Obesity, and Genes (DiOGenes). Am J Clin Nutr (2009) 90: 202–9.
- Tavecchio M, Simone M, Bernasconi S, Tognon G, Mazzini G, Erba E. Multi-parametric flow cytometric cell cycle analysis using TO-PRO-3 iodide (TP3): Detailed protocols. Acta Histochem (2008) 110: 232–44.
- Tognon G, Bernasconi S, Celli N, Faircloth GT, Cuevas C, Jimeno J, Erba E, D'Incalci M. Induction of resistance to Aplidin in a human ovarian cancer cell line related to MDR expression. Cancer Biol Ther (2005) 4:1325-30.
- Tognon G, Campagnoli A, Pinotti L, Dell'Orto V, Cheli F. Implementation of the electronic nose for the identification of mycotoxins in durum wheat (Triticum durum). Vet Res Comm (2005) 29(Suppl 2):391-3.
- Pinotti L, Campagnoli A, Tognon G, Cheli F, Dell’Orto V, Savoini G. Microscopic method in processed animal proteins identification in feed: applications of image analysis. Biotechnol Agron Soc Environ (2004) 8:249-51.
- Campagnoli A, Pinotti L, Tognon G, Cheli F, Baldi A, Dell’Orto V. Potential application of electronic nose in processed animal proteins (PAP) detection in feedstuffs. Biotechnol Agron Soc Environ (2004) 8:253-5.
- Tognon G, Frapolli R, Zaffaroni M, Erba E, Zucchetti M, Faircloth GT, D'Incalci M. Fetal bovine serum, but not human serum inhibits the in vitro cytotoxicity of ET-743 (YondelisTM; trabectedin). An example of potential problems for extrapolation of active drug concentrations from in vitro studies. Cancer Chem Pharm (2004) 53:89-90.
- Bottone MG, Soldani C, Tognon G, Gorrini C, Lazzè MC, Brison O, Ciomei M, Pellicciari C, Scovassi AI. Multiple effects of paclitaxel are modulated by high c-myc amplification level. Exp Cell Res (2003) 290:49-59.
- Erba E, Serafini M, Gaipa G, Tognon G, Marchini S, Celli N, Rotilio D, Broggini M, Jimeno J, Faircloth GT, Biondi A, D'Incalci M. The effect of Aplidine in acute lymphoblastic leucemia cells. Br J Cancer (2003) 89:763-773.
- Soldani C, Lazzé MC, Bottone MG, Tognon G, Biggiogera M, Pellicciari CE, Scovassi AI. Poly(ADP-ribose) Polymerase Cleavage During Apoptosis: When and Where?. Experimental Cell Research (2001) 269:193-201.

=== Science publications including books ===
- Tognon G. Ha ancora senso parlare di dieta mediterranea? Idee di un nutrizionista italiano trapiantato in scandinavia. (Does it still make sense to talk about the Mediterranean diet? Ideas from an Italian nutritionist relocated to Scandinavia). Montecovello Editore. 2013 ISBN 978-8867333509.
- Tognon G. Il nemico silenzioso. Difenditi dalle sostanze chimiche tossiche negli oggetti di uso quotidiano e negli alimenti. (The Silent Enemy. Defend yourself from toxic chemicals in food and everyday objects). Montecovello Editore. 2013 ISBN 978-8867331543.
- Tognon G. Sicurezza alimentare e salute umana: quali prospettive dai cambiamenti climatici? (Food safety and human health: what perspectives from climate change?). Montecovello Editore. 2012 ISBN 978-8897425885.
- Tognon G. Non é vero ma credici! Le bugie sulla corretta alimentazione e i consigli per scegliere alimenti di qualità (It's not true but believe it! Common lies about diet and nutrition and the right advices to choose high quality foods). Montecovello Editore. 2012 ISBN 978-88-6733-026-3.
