= Sandro Veronesi =

Sandro Veronesi may refer to:

- Sandro Veronesi (writer)
- Sandro Veronesi (entrepreneur)
