= Gianluca Marzullo =

Italian-German footballer (born 1991)

Personal information
- Date of birth: 4 January 1991 (age 35)
- Place of birth: Cosenza, Italy
- Height: 1.81 m (5 ft 11 in)
- Position: Forward

Team information
- Current team: Rot Weiss Ahlen
- Number: 10

Youth career
- 1996–1999: Blau Weiß 98 Gütersloh
- 1999–2005: FC Gütersloh
- 2005–2010: Arminia Bielefeld

Senior career*
Years	Team	Apps	(Gls)
2010–2012	Arminia Bielefeld II	60	(30)
2011–2012	Arminia Bielefeld	1	(0)
2012–2013	Bayer Leverkusen II	19	(0)
2013–2014	FC Gütersloh	14	(7)
2014–2015	Lokomotive Leipzig	15	(5)
2015–2017	Rot Weiss Ahlen	51	(17)
2017–2018	SC Verl	39	(8)
2018	Westfalia Herne	7	(0)
2019	Messina	15	(1)
2019–2021	Wuppertaler SV	41	(13)
2021–	Rot Weiss Ahlen	69	(12)
- * Club domestic league appearances and goals as of 12 November 2022

Gianluca Marzullo (born 4 January 1991) is an Italian-German footballer who plays as a forward for Rot Weiss Ahlen in the Regionalliga West.
