= Gianluca Bacchiocchi =

Italian footballer

Personal information
- Date of birth: 6 April 1987 (age 39)
- Place of birth: Roma, Italy
- Height: 1.73 m (5 ft 8 in)
- Position: Midfielder

Team information
- Current team: S.S. Cavese 1919

Senior career*
Years	Team	Apps	(Gls)
2006–2007	S.S. Barletta Calcio	27	(0)
2007–2009	A.S. Melfi	18	(0)
2009–	S.S. Cavese 1919	29	(2)
- * Club domestic league appearances and goals as of 5 December 2009

Gianluca Bacchiocchi (born 6 April 1987, in Roma) is an Italian association football midfielder who currently plays for S.S. Cavese 1919.

== Appearances on Italian Series ==
Serie C2 : 47 Apps, 2 Goals

Serie D : 27 Apps

Total : 74 Apps, 2 Goals
