= Gianluca Alfenoni =

Argentine footballer

Personal information
- Date of birth: 20 January 1996 (age 30)
- Place of birth: Zárate, Argentina
- Height: 1.79 m (5 ft 10 in)
- Position: Midfielder

Team information
- Current team: Deportivo Español

Youth career
- 2003–2013: Defensores Unidos

Senior career*
Years	Team	Apps	(Gls)
2013–2019	Defensores Unidos	88	(3)
2019–	Deportivo Español	0	(0)
- * Club domestic league appearances and goals as of 23:33, 15 August 2019 (UTC)

Gianluca Alfenoni (born 20 January 1996) is an Argentine professional footballer who plays as a midfielder for Deportivo Español.

== Career ==
Alfenoni's career began with Defensores Unidos. He scored three goals in eighty-one matches for the club in Primera C Metropolitana, across six seasons from 2013. They won promotion in 2017–18 to Primera B Metropolitana, with Alfenoni's tier three debut arriving on 19 November 2018 versus Deportivo Español; replacing Andrés Franzoia after eighty-one minutes, with his first start at that level coming in the succeeding March against Colegiales. Alfenoni announced his departure at the conclusion of the 2018–19 campaign, having spent a total of sixteen years with them. Alfenoni completed a move to Deportivo Español in June 2019.

== Career statistics ==
As of 15 August 2019.

Appearances and goals by club, season and competition
Club	Season	League			Cup		League Cup		Continental		Other		Total	
Club	Season	Division	Apps	Goals	Apps	Goals	Apps	Goals	Apps	Goals	Apps	Goals	Apps	Goals
Defensores Unidos	2018–19	Primera B Metropolitana	7	0	0	0	—		—		0	0	7	0
Deportivo Español	2019–20	Primera C Metropolitana	0	0	0	0	—		—		0	0	0	0
Career total			7	0	0	0	—		—		0	0	7	0

== Honours ==
Defensores Unidos

- Primera C Metropolitana: 2017–18
