= Jacopo Giuliani =

Italian footballer

Personal information
- Date of birth: 9 January 1999 (age 27)
- Place of birth: La Spezia, Italy
- Height: 1.78 m (5 ft 10 in)
- Position: Midfielder

Team information
- Current team: Real Forte Querceta

Youth career
- Spezia

Senior career*
Years	Team	Apps	(Gls)
2017–2020	Spezia	0	(0)
2018–2020	→ Pontedera (loan)	35	(0)
2020–2021	Carpi	0	(0)
2021	Spezia	0	(0)
2021–2023	Livorno	45	(4)
2023	Grosseto	8	(0)
2023–	Real Forte Querceta	2	(0)
- * Club domestic league appearances and goals as of 20 December 2023

Jacopo Giuliani (born 9 January 1999) is an Italian football player who plays for Serie D side Real Forte Querceta.

== Club career ==
He made his Serie C debut for Pontedera on 22 September 2018 in a game against Piacenza.

On 5 October 2020 his rights were sold to Carpi. He was not registered for Carpi and returned to the Under-19 squad of Spezia in January 2021. In late August 2021, Giuliani joined Eccellenza side Livorno.
