= Gianluca Arrighi =

Italian writer and lawyer

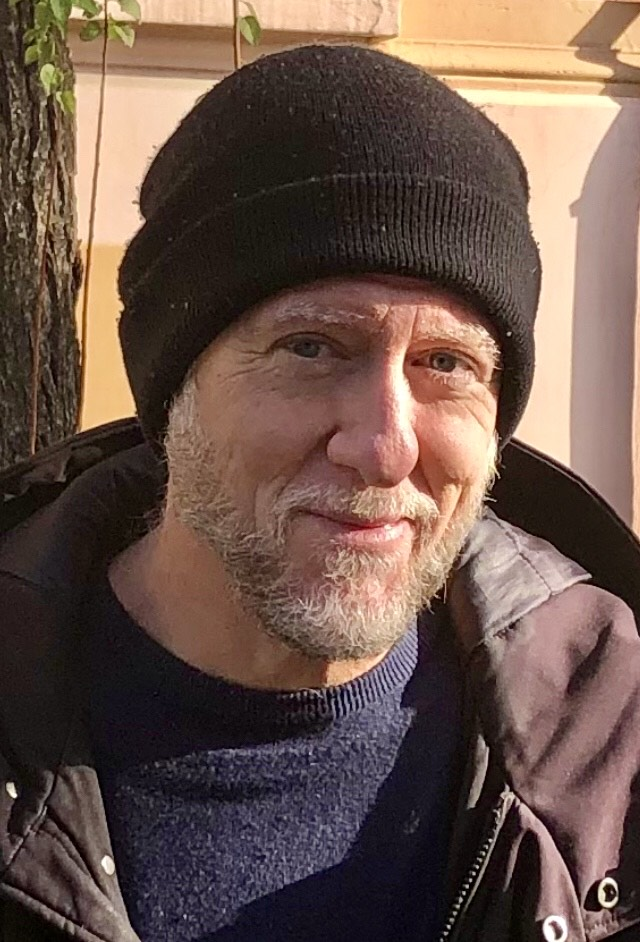
- Born: 3 October 1972 (age 53); Rome, Italy
- Education: Sapienza University of Rome
- Occupations: Writer, criminal lawyer
- Writing career
- Genres: Legal thriller Crime fiction

Gianluca Arrighi (born 3 October 1972) is an Italian writer and criminal lawyer.

== Education and legal career ==
Arrighi earned his MSc in Law, joining the Italian Bar Association in 2002. He has been Teaching Assistant of Criminal Law with both Sapienza University of Rome and the University of Cassino, and author of scholarly papers and articles published in law journals. He made his debut as a writer with Crimina romana in 2009: Arrighi drew on his experience as criminal lawyer for this short story collection, focusing on court cases he had handled, and which catalyzed him to start writing about actions of real offenders, focusing on their personal background and human traits. A limited edition of the book has been purchased by the Province of Rome under the Presidency of Nicola Zingaretti, and it was distributed as a reference reading for high school students as part of a project intended to promote a culture of lawfulness and to combat youth crime. Within this framework, Arrighi met about two hundred students, sitting for Q&A sessions about crimes and criminality. In 2023 he founded "Priya", a group of criminal lawyers under his coordination that provides legal assistance to victims of gender-based violence.

== Writing career ==
In 2012 Arrighi published Vincolo di sangue, based on his conversations with Rosalia Quartararo, who was sentenced to life imprisonment for killing her 18-year-old daughter in the summer of 1993. The book ranked sixth in the sales chart of the online bookstore IBS for the "real-life novels" category.

In the same year, Arrighi was one of eight Italian crime writers interviewed by Mediaset.

With L’inganno della memoria, published in March 2014, Arrighi brought to life the fictional character Elia Preziosi, a Rome-based enigmatic and aloof public prosecutor. About a month after its release, it was the only Italian title among the ten best-selling legal thrillers on IBS. Elia Preziosi featured again in two of Arrighi’s following thriller novels: namely, Il confine dell’ombra and A un passo dalla follia.

Oltre ogni verità is his first novel starring Jader Leoni.

Besides, since 2010 Arrighi has written several noir short stories.

In 2015 Arrighi was the victim of stalking by an aspiring writer, who accepted a plea bargain of eighteen months' imprisonment.

Between 2020 and 2021, he published the novel Intrigo in Costa Verde and the short-story collection Sulle orme del brivido. On 17 June 2022 the thriller La casa sul fiume was released, for which the filmmaking rights have been sold.

The graphic novel of the same name was adapted in 2023 from Arrighi's novel L'inganno della memoria, featuring the investigations of the fictional character Elia Preziosi.
