= Lorenzo Pecchia =

Italian footballer (born 2002)

Personal information
- Date of birth: 24 February 2002 (age 24)
- Place of birth: Piombino, Italy
- Position: Midfielder

Team information
- Current team: San Donato Tavarnelle

Youth career
- –2020: Livorno

Senior career*
| Years | Team | Apps | (Gls) |
| 2020–2024 | Livorno | 23 | (1) |
| 2021 | → Pro Livorno Sorgenti (loan) | 4 | (0) |
| 2023–2024 | → Real Forte Querceta (loan) | 29 | (0) |
| 2024– | San Donato Tavarnelle | 9 | (0) |
- * Club domestic league appearances and goals as of 17 November 2024

Lorenzo Pecchia (born 24 February 2002) is an Italian footballer who plays as a midfielder for Serie D club San Donato Tavarnelle.

== Club career ==
On 1 February 2021, he was loaned to Serie D side Pro Livorno Sorgenti.

== Club statistics ==
=== Club ===
As of 28 July 2020.

| Club | Season | League | | | Cup | | Other | | Total | |
| Club | Season | Division | Apps | Goals | Apps | Goals | Apps | Goals | Apps | Goals |
|---|---|---|---|---|---|---|---|---|---|---|
| Livorno | 2019–20 | Serie B | 2 | 0 | 0 | 0 | 0 | 0 | 2 | 0 |
| Career total | | | 2 | 0 | 0 | 0 | 0 | 0 | 2 | 0 |
