= Lorenzo Remedi =

Italian footballer

Personal information
- Date of birth: 7 June 1991 (age 35)
- Place of birth: Viareggio, Italy
- Height: 1.82 m (6 ft 0 in)
- Position: Midfielder

Team information
- Current team: Camaiore

Senior career*
Years	Team	Apps	(Gls)
2011–2015	Livorno	17	(0)
2010–2011	→ Pontedera (loan)	31	(0)
2013	→ Pontedera (loan)	12	(0)
2013–2014	→ Nocerina (loan)	16	(0)
2016	Fortis Juventus	19	(1)
2016	Gavorrano	12	(2)
2016–2017	Modena	19	(0)
2017–2018	Gavorrano	22	(2)
2018–2019	Pro Piacenza	14	(1)
2019	Arezzo	9	(0)
2019–2020	Giana Erminio	19	(2)
2020	Rimini	5	(0)
2020–2021	Aglianese	31	(2)
2021–2022	Lentigione	25	(0)
2022–2023	Aglianese	31	(3)
2023	Mobilieri Ponsacco	12	(0)
2023–2024	Aglianese	16	(0)
2024–2025	Prato	30	(1)
2025	Gavorrano	14	(0)
2025–	Camaiore	9	(1)
- * Club domestic league appearances and goals as of 22 February 2026

Lorenzo Remedi (born 7 June 1991) is an Italian professional footballer who plays as a midfielder for Serie D club Camaiore.

== Career ==
Remedi has played for Livorno and Pontedera.

On 15 January 2019, he signed with Arezzo.

On 15 January 2020 he joined Rimini on a 1.5-year contract.

On 22 July 2020 he moved to Aglianese in Serie D.
