= 2021–22 Ternana Calcio season =

Ternana
2021–22 season
- Owner: Stefano Bandecchi
- Chairman: Stefano Ranucci
- Manager: Cristiano Lucarelli
- Stadium: Stadio Libero Liberati
- Serie B: 10th
- Coppa Italia: Second round
- Top goalscorer: League: Alfredo Donnarumma (14); All: Alfredo Donnarumma (15)

The 2021–22 season was Ternana Calcio's first season back in second division of the Italian football league, the Serie B, and the 97th as a football club.

== Players ==
=== First-team quad ===
As of 31 January 2022

Note: Flags indicate national team as defined under FIFA eligibility rules; some limited exceptions apply. Players may hold more than one non-FIFA nationality.

No.	Pos.	Nation	Player
1	GK	ITA	Antony Iannarilli
3	DF	ITA	Alessandro Celli
4	DF	SEN	Ndir Mame Ass
5	MF	ITA	Antonio Palumbo
6	DF	CRO	Ivan Kontek
7	MF	ITA	Federico Furlan
8	MF	ITA	Mattia Proietti
9	FW	ITA	Simone Mazzocchi (on loan from Atalanta)
11	FW	ITA	Christian Capone (on loan from Atalanta)
12	GK	ITA	Tommaso Vitali
13	DF	FRA	Modibo Diakité
15	DF	DEN	Frederik Sørensen
17	MF	URU	César Falletti (on loan from Bologna)
18	FW	ITA	Pietro Rovaglia
19	DF	ITA	Marco Capuano
20	MF	ITA	Fabrizio Paghera
21	MF	ITA	Anthony Partipilo

No.	Pos.	Nation	Player
22	GK	LTU	Titas Krapikas
23	DF	ITA	Luca Ghiringhelli
24	MF	ITA	Diego Peralta
25	MF	ITA	Marino Defendi (captain)
26	DF	CRO	Luka Bogdan (on loan from Salernitana)
28	MF	ITA	Aniello Salzano
29	DF	FRA	Salim Diakite
32	FW	ITA	Stefano Pettinari
33	GK	ITA	Angelo Casadei
34	MF	ITA	Davide Agazzi
42	DF	SLO	Matija Boben
70	FW	ITA	Gabriele Capanni (on loan from Milan)
80	MF	GRE	Ilias Koutsoupias (on loan from Virtus Entella)
87	DF	ITA	Bruno Martella
88	MF	ITA	Leonardo Mazza
99	FW	ITA	Alfredo Donnarumma (on loan from Brescia)

=== Out on loan ===
Note: Flags indicate national team as defined under FIFA eligibility rules; some limited exceptions apply. Players may hold more than one non-FIFA nationality.

No.	Pos.	Nation	Player
—	GK	ITA	Andrea Tozzo (at Seregno)
—	DF	ITA	Mattia Lucarelli (at Pro Sesto)
—	DF	ITA	Federico Mazzarani (at Pro Sesto)
—	DF	ITA	Francesco Siragusa (at Chieti)
—	MF	ITA	Filippo Damian (at ACR Messina)

No.	Pos.	Nation	Player
—	MF	CUB	Davide Incerti (at Atletico Uri)
—	FW	ITA	Kingsley Boateng (at Fermana)
—	FW	ITA	Alexis Ferrante (at Foggia)
—	FW	ITA	Guido Marilungo (at Pro Sesto)
—	FW	ITA	Gabriele Onesti (at Bologna U19)

== Pre-season and friendlies ==
Win Draw Loss Fixtures

18 July 2021 Friendly	Roma (Italy)	2–0	(Italy) Ternana	Rome, Italy
18:00 CEST (UTC+2)	C. Pérez 10'; Kumbulla 53'			Stadium: Trigoria training ground Attendance: 0 Referee: Mario Cascone (Italy)

23 July 2021 Friendly	Ternana (Italy)	3–0	(Italy) Grosseto	Pisa, Italy
17:00 CEST (UTC+2)				Stadium: Centro Preparazione Olimpica di Tirrenia

31 July 2021 Friendly	Frosinone (Italy)	2–0	(Italy) Ternana	Frosinone, Italy
17:00 CEST (UTC+2)				Stadium: Stadio Benito Stirpe

4 September 2021 Friendly	Sampdoria (Italy)	3–1	(Italy) Ternana	Bogliasco, Italy
11:00 CEST (UTC+2)	Caputo 25'; Chabot 70'; Verre 75'	Report	Capone 86'	Stadium: Centro sportivo Gloriano Mugnaini; Referee: Matteo Gariglio

== Competitions ==
=== Overall record ===
Competition	First match	Last match	Starting round	Final position	Record							
Competition	First match	Last match	Starting round	Final position	Pld	W	D	L	GF	GA	GD	Win %
Serie B	22 August 2021	6 May 2022	Matchday 1	10th	38	15	9	14	58	61	−3	39.47
Coppa Italia	8 August 2021	14 December 2021	Preliminary round	Second round	3	1	1	1	7	8	−1	33.33
Total					41	16	10	15	65	69	−4	39.02

Source: Soccerway

=== Serie A ===
==== League table ====
Pos	Team	Pld	W	D	L	GF	GA	GD	Pts	Promotion, qualification or relegation
8	Perugia	38	14	16	8	40	32	+8	58 (Note: Perugia finished ahead of Frosinone on head-to-head points: Frosinone 0–0 Perugia, Perugia 3–0 Frosinone.)	Promotion play-offs preliminary round
9	Frosinone	38	15	13	10	58	45	+13	58	
10	Ternana	38	15	9	14	58	61	−3	54	
11	Cittadella	38	13	13	12	38	36	+2	52	
12	Parma	38	11	16	11	48	43	+5	49	

Source: Lega Serie B (in Italian), Soccerway (in English)
Rules for classification: 1) Points; 2) Head-to-head points; 3) Head-to-head goal difference; 4) Goal difference; 5) Goals scored; 6) Draw.

==== Results summary ====
Overall								Home						Away					
Pld	W	D	L	GF	GA	GD	Pts	W	D	L	GF	GA	GD	W	D	L	GF	GA	GD
38	15	9	14	58	61	−3	54	9	2	8	30	27	+3	6	7	6	28	34	−6

Source: Serie B

==== Results by round ====
Round	1	2	3	4	5	6	7	8	9	10	11	12	13	14	15	16	17	18	19	20	21	22	23	24	25	26	27	28	29	30	31	32	33	34	35	36	37	38
Ground	H	A	H	A	H	H	A	A	H	A	H	A	H	A	H	A	H	A	H	A	H	A	H	A	A	H	H	A	H	A	H	A	H	A	H	A	H	A
Result	L	L	L	D	W	W	L	W	W	L	L	W	D	D	W	D	L	D	L	D	W	D	L	W	L	L	W	L	W	D	W	W	L	W	D	W	W	L
Position	19	17	19	17	15	15	15	14	10	14	16	13	13	13	13	11	12	12	13	12	12	13	14	13	13	14	13	13	12	13	13	11	13	11	10	10	10	10

Source: Serie B
A = Away; H = Home; W = Win; D = Draw; L = Loss

==== Matches ====
The league fixtures were announced on 24 July 2021.

=== Coppa Italia ===
8 August 2021 Preliminary round	Ternana	1–1 (a.e.t.) (4–3 p)	Avellino	Terni
18:30 CEST (UTC+2)	Falletti 63'	Report	D'Angelo 25'	Stadium: Stadio Renato Dall'Ara; Attendance: 1,498; Referee: Niccolò Baroni
	Penalties
	Paghera (penalty missed); Capone (penalty missed); Pettinari (penalty scored); Mazzocchi (penalty scored); Salzano (penalty scored); Furlan (penalty scored)		(penalty scored) Plescia; (penalty scored) Aloi; (penalty scored) Tito; (penalty missed) De Francesco; (penalty missed) Maniero; (penalty missed) Rizzo

16 August 2021 First round	Bologna	4–5	Ternana	Bologna
18:00 CEST (UTC+2)	Domínguez 38'; Mbaye (yellow card) 52'; Arnautović 56'; Soriano 58'; Orsolini 76' (pen.)	Report	Agazzi 6'; Donnarumma (penalty missed) 10', 21'; Sørensen (yellow card) 26'; Peralta 40', 54'; Falletti 50' (pen.); Salzano (yellow card) 59'; Celli (yellow card) 66'; Iannarilli (yellow card) 83'	Stadium: Stadio Renato Dall'Ara; Attendance: 5,360; Referee: Luca Zufferli

14 December 2021 Second round	Venezia	3–1	Ternana	Venice
15:00 CET (UTC+1)	Schnegg (yellow card) 9'; Sigurðsson (yellow card) 23'; Heymans 49'; Črnigoj 66', (yellow card) 74'; De Vries (yellow card) 80'; Forte 81'	Report	Pettinari (yellow card) 40', (goal) 53'	Stadium: Stadio Pier Luigi Penzo; Attendance: 5,219; Referee: Daniele Minelli
