= 2022–23 Ternana Calcio season =

Ternana Calcio
2022–23 season
- Owner: Stefano Bandecchi
- Chairman: Stefano Ranucci
- Manager: Aurelio Andreazzoli
- Stadium: Stadio Libero Liberati
- Serie B: 7th
- Coppa Italia: Round of 64
- Top goalscorer: League: Andrea Favilli (5); All: Andrea Favilli (5)

The 2022–23 season is the 98th in the history of Ternana Calcio and their second consecutive season in the top flight. The club will participate in Serie B and Coppa Italia.

== Players ==
As of 25 January 2023

Note: Flags indicate national team as defined under FIFA eligibility rules; some limited exceptions apply. Players may hold more than one non-FIFA nationality.

No.	Pos.	Nation	Player
1	GK	ITA	Antony Iannarilli
2	MF	SEN	Mamadou Coulibaly (on loan from Salernitana)
3	GK	ITA	Angelo Casadei
4	DF	DEN	Frederik Sørensen
5	MF	ITA	Antonio Palumbo
6	DF	ITA	Federico Mazzarani
7	MF	ITA	Gabriele Capanni
8	MF	ITA	Mattia Proietti
9	FW	ITA	Alfredo Donnarumma
10	FW	URU	César Falletti
12	GK	LTU	Titas Krapikas
13	DF	ITA	Valerio Mantovani (on loan from Salernitana)
14	MF	ITA	Francesco Di Tacchio
17	FW	ITA	Andrea Favilli (on loan from Genoa)

No.	Pos.	Nation	Player
19	DF	ITA	Marco Capuano
20	MF	ITA	Fabrizio Paghera
21	FW	ITA	Anthony Partipilo
22	GK	ITA	Alessandro Morlupo
23	DF	FRA	Salim Diakite
24	DF	ITA	Luca Ghiringhelli
25	MF	ITA	Marino Defendi (captain)
26	DF	CRO	Luka Bogdan (on loan from Salernitana)
27	DF	SEN	Mame Ass Ndir
29	MF	ITA	Francesco Cassata (on loan from Genoa)
33	GK	ITA	Tommaso Vitali
34	MF	ITA	Davide Agazzi
87	DF	ITA	Bruno Martella
91	DF	ITA	Niccolò Corrado

=== Out on loan ===
Note: Flags indicate national team as defined under FIFA eligibility rules; some limited exceptions apply. Players may hold more than one non-FIFA nationality.

No.	Pos.	Nation	Player
—	DF	SLO	Matija Boben (at Pescara until 30 June 2023)
—	DF	ITA	Alessandro Celli (at Südtirol until 30 June 2023)
—	DF	ITA	Luca Mercorella (at Barletta until 30 June 2023)
—	MF	ITA	Filippo Damian (at Trento until 30 June 2023)
—	MF	ITA	Federico Furlan (at Triestina until 30 June 2023)
—	MF	ITA	Guido Marilungo (at Renacanatese until 30 June 2023)

No.	Pos.	Nation	Player
—	MF	ITA	Matteo Ortolani (at Chiasso until 30 June 2023)
—	FW	ITA	Alexis Ferrante (at Cesena until 30 June 2023)
—	FW	ITA	Gabriele Onesti (at Fermana until 30 June 2023)
—	FW	ITA	Stefano Pettinari (at Benevento until 30 June 2023)
—	FW	ITA	Pietro Rovaglia (at Montevarchi until 30 June 2023)

== Pre-season and friendlies ==
Win Draw Loss Fixtures

22 July 2022 Friendly	Pontedera (Italy)	0–3	(Italy) Ternana	Florence, Italy
18:00 CEST (UTC+2)				Stadium: Campo Enzo Bearzot

23 July 2022 Friendly	Montevarchi Calcio (Italy)	0–4	(Italy) Ternana	Montevarchi, Italy
18:00 CEST (UTC+2)				Stadium: Stadio Gastone Brilli Peri

30 July 2022 Friendly	Frosinone (Italy)	3–2	(Italy) Ternana	Frosinone, Italy
18:00 CEST (UTC+2)	Lucioni 14'; Szymiński 23'; Ciervo 27'		Partipilo 21'; Martella 24'	Stadium: Stadio Benito Stirpe; Attendance: 732; Referee: Ermanno Feliciani

== Competitions ==
=== Overall record ===
Competition	First match	Last match	Starting round	Final position	Record							
Competition	First match	Last match	Starting round	Final position	Pld	W	D	L	GF	GA	GD	Win %
Serie B	12–14 August 2022	19 May 2023	Matchday 1		22	9	5	8	24	27	−3	40.91
Coppa Italia	8 August 2022		Round of 64	Round of 64	1	0	0	1	2	3	−1	0.00
Total					23	9	5	9	26	30	−4	39.13

Last updated: January 2023
Source: Soccerway

=== Serie B ===
==== League table ====
Pos	Team	Pld	W	D	L	GF	GA	GD	Pts	Promotion, qualification or relegation
12	Ascoli	38	12	11	15	40	47	−7	47 (Note: Head-to-head points: Pisa 5, Ascoli 5, Como 4. Head-to-head goal difference: Pisa +1, Ascoli −1.)	
13	Como	38	10	17	11	47	48	−1	47	
14	Ternana	38	11	10	17	37	52	−15	43 (Note: Ternana finished ahead of Cittadella on head-to-head goal difference: Cittadella 0–2 Ternana, Ternana 1–2 Cittadella.)	
15	Cittadella	38	9	16	13	34	45	−11	43	
16	Brescia	38	9	13	16	36	57	−21	40	Spared from relegation

Source: Soccerway (in English)
Rules for classification: 1) Points; 2) Head-to-head points; 3) Head-to-head goal difference; 4) Goal difference; 5) Goals scored; 6) Draw.

==== Results summary ====
Overall								Home						Away					
Pld	W	D	L	GF	GA	GD	Pts	W	D	L	GF	GA	GD	W	D	L	GF	GA	GD
0	0	0	0	0	0	0	0	0	0	0	0	0	0	0	0	0	0	0	0

Last updated: January 2023.
Source: Serie B

==== Results by round ====
Round	1
Ground	
Result	
Position	

Updated to match(es) played on January 2023. Source: Serie B
A = Away; H = Home; W = Win; D = Draw; L = Loss

==== Matches ====
The league fixtures will be announced on 15 July 2022.
