= List of Italian football transfers summer 2021 =

The 2021 Italian football summer transfer window ran from 1 July to 31 August 2021. This list includes transfers featuring at least one club from either Serie A or Serie B that were completed after the end of the winter 2020–21 transfer window on 31 January 2021 and before the end of the 2021 summer window on 31 August. While free agents could join a club at any time, deals between clubs that happened between 1 September and 2 January became effective starting 3 January, when the winter 2021–22 transfer window officially opened.

== Transfers ==
Legend

- Those clubs in Italic indicate that the player already left the team on loan on this or the previous season or a new signing that immediately left the club.

Date	Name	Moving from	Moving to	Fee
17 February 2021	(North Macedonia) Luka Stankovski	(North Macedonia) Rabotnički	Monza	Undisclosed
3 March 2021	(United States) Weston McKennie	(Germany) Schalke 04	Juventus	€18,5m (Note: The player already played for his new club in 2020-21 season, the deal turned from temporary to definitive.)
13 April 2021	(France) Maxime Lopez	(France) OM	Sassuolo	Undisclosed
22 April 2021	(Sweden) Gabriel Sandberg	(Sweden) Nyköping	Venezia	Undisclosed
29 April 2021	(France) Alban Lafont	Fiorentina	(France) Nantes	Undisclosed
3 May 2021	(Canada) Damiano Pecile	(Canada) Vancouver Whitecaps	Venezia	Loan
4 May 2021	(Spain) Matías Mir	(Uruguay) Peñarol	Parma	Free
13 May 2021	(Argentina) Lucas Boyé	Torino	(Spain) Elche	Undisclosed
14 May 2021	(Belgium) Daan Heymans	(Belgium) Waasland-Beveren	Venezia	Free
21 May 2021	(Brazil) Douglas Costa	Juventus	(Brazil) Grêmio	Loan
26 May 2021	(Ivory Coast) Gervinho	Parma	(Turkey) Trabzonspor	Free
26 May 2021	(Brazil) Bruno Peres	Roma	(Turkey) Trabzonspor	Free
27 May 2021	(France) Mike Maignan	(France) Lille	Milan	Undisclosed
27 May 2021	Federico Gatti	Pro Patria	Frosinone	Undisclosed
28 May 2021	Daniele Padelli	Inter	Udinese	Free
28 May 2021	(Slovenia) Luka Koblar	(Slovenia) Maribor	Frosinone	Undisclosed
2 June 2021	(Brazil) Léo Sena	(Brazil) Atlético Mineiro	Spezia	Undisclosed
4 June 2021	Luigi Cuppone	Casertana	Cittadella	Free
6 June 2021	(Slovakia) Dávid Hancko	Fiorentina	(Czech Republic) Sparta Prague	Undisclosed
9 June 2021	Luca Ghiringhelli	Cittadella	Ternana	Free
10 June 2021	Marco Brescianini	Milan	Monza	Loan
10 June 2021	(Brazil) Nícolas Andrade	Reggina	Pisa	Free
11 June 2021	(Austria) David Schnegg	(Austria) LASK	Venezia	Undisclosed
11 June 2021	Davide Mondonico	AlbinoLeffe	Crotone	Free
14 June 2021	Filippo Nardi	Novara	Cremonese	Undisclosed
14 June 2021	Alessandro Tuia	Benevento	Lecce	Free
14 June 2021	Roberto Zammarini	Pisa	Pordenone	Undisclosed
15 June 2021	(Spain) Álvaro Morata	(Spain) Atlético Madrid	Juventus	Loan
15 June 2021	(Belgium) Senna Miangué	Cagliari	(Belgium) Cercle Brugge	Loan
15 June 2021	Antonio Palumbo	Sampdoria	Ternana	Undisclosed
16 June 2021	Salvatore Elia	Atalanta	Perugia	Undisclosed
17 June 2021	Nicola Dalmonte	Genoa	Vicenza	Undisclosed
17 June 2021	Gianluigi Buffon	Juventus	Parma	Free
17 June 2021	(Israel) Dor Peretz	(Israel) Maccabi Tel Aviv	Venezia	Free
17 June 2021	(England) Fikayo Tomori	(England) Chelsea	Milan	Undisclosed
18 June 2021	(Denmark) Lukas Klitten	(Denmark) AaB	Frosinone	Free
18 June 2021	(Croatia) Stanko Jurić	(Croatia) Hajduk Split	Parma	Undisclosed
19 June 2021	(Bulgaria) Kiril Despodov	Cagliari	(Bulgaria) Ludogorets	Undisclosed
21 June 2021	(Czech Republic) Jaromír Zmrhal	Brescia	(Slovakia) Slovan Bratislava	Undisclosed
21 June 2021	(Uruguay) Diego Laxalt	Milan	(Russia) Dynamo Moscow	Undisclosed
22 June 2021	(Canada) Joakim Milli	Lecce	Virtus Francavilla	Undisclosed
22 June 2021	(Turkey) Hakan Çalhanoğlu	Milan	Inter	Free
22 June 2021	Rayyan Baniya	Verona	(Turkey) Fatih Karagümrük	Undisclosed
22 June 2021	(Brazil) Marlon	Sassuolo	(Ukraine) Shakhtar Donetsk	Undisclosed
22 June 2021	Marco Olivieri	Juventus	Lecce	Loan
23 June 2021	(France) Alexis Blin	(France) Amiens	Lecce	Undisclosed
23 June 2021	(Ghana) Kevin-Prince Boateng	Monza	(Germany) Hertha BSC	Free
23 June 2021	(Argentina) Nicolás González	(Germany) VfB Stuttgart	Fiorentina	Undisclosed
24 June 2021	(France) Wylan Cyprien	Parma	(France) Nantes	Loan
24 June 2021	(Switzerland) Nicky Beloko	Fiorentina	(Switzerland) Neuchâtel Xamax	Undisclosed
25 June 2021	Alex Cordaz	Crotone	Inter	Undisclosed
25 June 2021	Andrea Danzi	Verona	Cittadella	Undisclosed
27 June 2021	(Poland) Adrian Benedyczak	(Poland) Pogoń Szczecin	Parma	Undisclosed
28 June 2021	(Nigeria) Tyronne Ebuehi	(Portugal) Benfica	Venezia	Loan
28 June 2021	(Sweden) Svante Ingelsson	Udinese	(Germany) Hansa Rostock	Undisclosed
28 June 2021	Gianluca Saro	Pro Vercelli	Crotone	Undisclosed
29 June 2021	(Sweden) Jonathan Jorge	(Sweden) Hammarby	Venezia	Loan
29 June 2021	Michele Di Gregorio	Inter	Monza	Loan
30 June 2021	Lorenzo Paolucci	Reggina	(Belgium) Union SG	Undisclosed
30 June 2021	(Iceland) Brynjar Ingi Bjarnason	(Iceland) KA	Lecce	Undisclosed
30 June 2021	(Argentina) Ignacio Pussetto	(England) Watford	Udinese	Loan
30 June 2021	Tommaso D'Orazio	Bari	Ascoli	Loan
30 June 2021	Lorenzo Gavioli	Inter	Reggina	Loan
30 June 2021	(Honduras) Rigoberto Rivas	Inter	Reggina	Undisclosed
1 July 2021	Simone Perilli	Pisa	Brescia	Free
1 July 2021	(France) Mattéo Tramoni	Cagliari	Brescia	Loan
1 July 2021	(Ghana) Davis Mensah	Triestina	Pordenone	Undisclosed
1 July 2021	(Poland) Aleksander Buksa	(Poland) Wisła Kraków	Genoa	Free
2 July 2021	(Argentina) Juan Musso	Udinese	Atalanta	Undisclosed
2 July 2021	(The Gambia) Musa Barrow	Atalanta	Bologna	Undisclosed
2 July 2021	(France) Adama Soumaoro	(France) Lille	Bologna	Undisclosed
2 July 2021	Kevin Bonifazi	S.P.A.L.	Bologna	Undisclosed
2 July 2021	Victor De Lucia	Feralpisalò	Frosinone	Free
2 July 2021	Hamza Haoudi	Livorno	Frosinone	Free
3 July 2021	(Netherlands) Sydney van Hooijdonk	(Netherlands) NAC Breda	Bologna	Undisclosed
3 July 2021	(Netherlands) Kevin Strootman	(France) OM	Cagliari	Loan
3 July 2021	(Albania) Etrit Berisha	S.P.A.L.	Torino	Free
3 July 2021	Giacomo Zanotel	Pordenone	Torino	Free
3 July 2021	Marco Varnier	Atalanta	Como	Loan
3 July 2021	(Malta) Alexander Satariano	(Malta) Sliema Wanderers	Frosinone	Free
4 July 2021	(Turkey) Cengiz Ünder	Roma	(France) Marseille	Loan
4 July 2021	Jean Freddi Greco	Torino	Pordenone	Undisclosed
5 July 2021	(Netherlands) Kevin Diks	Fiorentina	(Denmark) Copenhagen	Undisclosed
5 July 2021	(Bulgaria) Petko Hristov	Fiorentina	Spezia	Undisclosed
5 July 2021	Davide Agazzi	Vicenza	Ternana	Free
5 July 2021	(Cyprus) Nicholas Ioannou	(England) Nottingham Forest	Como	Loan
6 July 2021	(Morocco) Achraf Hakimi	Inter	(France) Paris Saint-Germain	€70m
6 July 2021	Enrico Guarna	Reggina	Ascoli	Undisclosed
7 July 2021	(Cameroon) Martin Hongla	(Belgium) Antwerp	Verona	Loan
7 July 2021	Alessandro Farroni	Reggina	Vis Pesaro	Loan
8 July 2021	(Slovenia) Matija Boben	Livorno	Ternana	Undisclosed
8 July 2021	(Spain) Pau López	Roma	(France) Marseille	Loan
8 July 2021	Sandro Tonali	Brescia	Milan	Undisclosed
9 July 2021	Manuel Gasparini	Udinese	Pro Vercelli	Loan
9 July 2021	Luca Mazzitelli	Sassuolo	Monza	Undisclosed
9 July 2021	(Denmark) Magnus Warming	(Denmark) Lyngby Boldklub	Torino	Undisclosed
12 July 2021	Lorenzo Andrenacci	Brescia	Genoa	Free
12 July 2021	(Ivory Coast) Emmanuel Latte Lath	Atalanta	S.P.A.L.	Loan
12 July 2021	Luca Vido	Atalanta	Cremonese	Loan
12 July 2021	Marco Carnesecchi	Atalanta	Cremonese	Loan
12 July 2021	Caleb Okoli	Atalanta	Cremonese	Loan
12 July 2021	Lorenzo Bernasconi	Cremonese	Atalanta	2-year loan
12 July 2021	(Argentina) Rodrigo De Paul	Udinese	(Spain) Atlético Madrid	Undisclosed
12 July 2021	(Poland) Piotr Parzyszek	Frosinone	(Poland) Pogoń Szczecin	Loan
12 July 2021	Mattia Valoti	S.P.A.L.	Monza	Loan
12 July 2021	Michele Cavion	Ascoli	Salernitana	Free
13 July 2021	(Portugal) Rui Patrício	(England) Wolverhampton	Roma	€11,5m
13 July 2021	(Belgium) Zinho Vanheusden	(Belgium) Standard Liège	Inter	Undisclosed
13 July 2021	Sebastiano Esposito	Inter	(Switzerland) Basel	Loan
13 July 2021	(The Gambia) Musa Juwara	Bologna	Crotone	Loan
13 July 2021	Francesco Lisi	Pisa	Perugia	Loan
13 July 2021	(Portugal) João Mário	Inter	(Portugal) Benfica	Free
13 July 2021	Vasco Regini	Sampdoria	Reggina	Free
13 July 2021	Alessandro Micai	Salernitana	Reggina	Loan
13 July 2021	Federico Ricci	Sassuolo	Reggina	Undisclosed
13 July 2021	Stefano Turati	Sassuolo	Reggina	Loan
13 July 2021	Filippo Scaglia	Monza	Como	Undisclosed
14 July 2021	(Guadeloupe) Andreaw Gravillon	Inter	(France) Reims	Loan
14 July 2021	Lorenzo Pirola	Inter	Monza	Loan
14 July 2021	Nicholas Bonfanti	Inter	Modena	Undisclosed
14 July 2021	Simone Mazzocchi	Atalanta	Ternana	Loan
14 July 2021	(Serbia) Boris Radunović	Atalanta	Ternana	Undisclosed
14 July 2021	Christian Sussi	Arezzo	Pisa	Free
14 July 2021	Nicolò Bruschi	Fiorenzuola	Pisa	Free
14 July 2021	Giacomo Calò	Genoa	Benevento	Loan
15 July 2021	Filippo Serena	Venezia	Grosseto	Loan
15 July 2021	Pietro Beruatto	Juventus	Pisa	Loan
15 July 2021	(Germany) Idrissa Touré	Juventus	Pisa	Loan
15 July 2021	Damiano Franco	Lazio	Reggina	Free
15 July 2021	(Sweden) Nikola Vasic	Reggina	(Sweden) Vasalund	Loan
15 July 2021	(United States) Tanner Tessmann	(United States) Dallas	Venezia	Undisclosed
15 July 2021	Destiny Udogie	Verona	Udinese	Loan
15 July 2021	Luca Crecco	Pescara	Vicenza	Loan
15 July 2021	Frank Tsadjout	Milan	Pordenone	Loan
15 July 2021	Nicolò Cambiaghi	Atalanta	Pordenone	Loan
15 July 2021	(France) Jean Lambert Evans	Crotone	(France) Pau	Undisclsoed
15 July 2021	Stefano Pettinari	Lecce	Ternana	Free
15 July 2021	Emanuele Suagher	Ternana	FeralpiSalò	Loan
15 July 2021	(Albania) Aristidi Kolaj	Sassuolo	Alessandria	Undisclosed
16 July 2021	(Brazil) Felipe Anderson	(England) West Ham	Lazio	Undisclosed
16 July 2021	(Sweden) Nils Arvidsson	(Sweden) Helsingborg	Venezia	Loan
16 July 2021	(Tunisia) Karim Laribi	Verona	Reggina	Undisclosed
16 July 2021	Marco Calderoni	Lecce	Vicenza	Undisclosed
16 July 2021	Cristian Dell'Orco	Sassuolo	Perugia	Undisclosed
16 July 2021	(Iceland) Hjörtur Hermannsson	(Denmark) Brøndby	Pisa	Free
16 July 2021	Emmanuel Gyabuaa	Atalanta	Perugia	Loan
16 July 2021	Luca Valzania	Atalanta	Cremonese	Loan
16 July 2021	Lorenzo Peli	Atalanta	Como	Loan
16 July 2021	(Romania) Ionuț Nedelcearu	(Greece) AEK Athens	Crotone	Loan
17 July 2021	(France) Olivier Giroud	(England) Chelsea	Milan	Undisclosed
17 July 2021	(Poland) Paweł Jaroszyński	Genoa	Salernitana	Loan
17 July 2021	Alberto Paleari	Genoa	Benevento	Loan
17 July 2021	Francesco Bardi	Frosinone	Bologna	Undisclosed
17 July 2021	Federico Ravaglia	Bologna	Frosinone	Loan
17 July 2021	Federico Proia	Cittadella	Vicenza	Undisclosed
17 July 2021	(Croatia) Anton Krešić	Atalanta	(Croatia) Rijeka	Loan
17 July 2021	Gabriel Lunetta	Atalanta	Alessandria	Loan
17 July 2021	Diego Fabbrini	(Romania) Dinamo București	Ascoli	Free
18 July 2021	(Senegal) Fodé Ballo-Touré	(France) Monaco	Milan	Undisclosed
18 July 2021	Giorgio Altare	Genoa	Cagliari	Undisclosed
18 July 2021	(Slovenia) Aljaz Tavcar	(Slovenia) Bilje	Ascoli	Undisclosed
19 July 2021	Nadir Zortea	Atalanta	Salernitana	Loan
19 July 2021	(Burkina Faso) Bryan Dabo	Benevento	(Turkey) Çaykur Rizespor	Undisclosed
19 July 2021	(Argentina) Julián Illanes	Fiorentina	Pescara	Undisclosed
19 July 2021	Edoardo Pierozzi	Fiorentina	Alessandria	Undisclosed
20 July 2021	Salvatore Elia	Atalanta	Benevento	Loan
20 July 2021	(Brazil) Rodrigo Guth	Atalanta	(Netherlands) NEC Nijmegen	Loan
20 July 2021	(Netherlands) Justin Kluivert	Roma	(France) Nice	Loan
20 July 2021	Marco Silvestri	Verona	Udinese	Undisclosed
20 July 2021	Lorenzo Montipò	Benevento	Verona	Loan
20 July 2021	Andrea Adamoli	Empoli	Cesena	Loan
20 July 2021	(Slovenia) Petar Stojanović	(Croatia) Dinamo Zagreb	Empoli	Loan
20 July 2021	Leonardo Loria	Pisa	Monopoli	Loan
20 July 2021	(Belgium) Zinho Vanheusden	Inter	Genoa	Loan
21 July 2021	(Brazil) Felipe Vizeu	Udinese	(Japan) Yokohama	Loan
21 July 2021	(Brazil) Dalbert	Inter	Cagliari	Loan
21 July 2021	(Poland) Tomasz Kupisz	Salernitana	Pordenone	Undisclosed
21 July 2021	(Nigeria) Joel Obi	Chievo	Salernitana	Free
21 July 2021	Edoardo Masciangelo	Pescara	Benevento	Loan
21 July 2021	Stefano Gori	Juventus	Como	Loan
21 July 2021	Francesco Belli	Pisa	Bari	Loan
21 July 2021	Filippo Berra	Bari	Pisa	Undisclosed
21 July 2021	Lorenzo Lucca	Palermo	Pisa	Undisclosed
22 July 2021	(France) Kelvin Amian	(France) Toulouse	Spezia	Undisclosed
22 July 2021	Jacopo Pellegrini	Sassuolo	Pordenone	Loan
22 July 2021	Leonardo Sernicola	Sassuolo	Cremonese	Loan
22 July 2021	Federico Mazzarani	Ternana	Pro Sesto	Loan
23 July 2021	(Norway) Stefan Strandberg	(Russia) Ural Yekaterinburg	Salernitana	Free
23 July 2021	Giuseppe Fella	Salernitana	Palermo	Loan
23 July 2021	Emanuele Matteucci	Empoli	Pontedera	Loan
23 July 2021	(Poland) Szymon Żurkowski	Fiorentina	Empoli	Loan
23 July 2021	(France) Soualiho Meïté	Torino	(Portugal) Benfica	Undisclosed
23 July 2021	Andrea Poli	Bologna	(Turkey) Antalyaspor	Undisclosed
23 July 2021	Marco Pompetti	Inter	Pescara	Loan
23 July 2021	Luca Coccolo	Juventus	S.P.A.L.	Loan
23 July 2021	(Portugal) Pedro Pereira	(Portugal) Benfica	Monza	Loan
23 July 2021	Silvio Colella	Lecce	Bitonto	Loan
24 July 2021	Antonio Candela	Genoa	Cesena	Loan
24 July 2021	(Nigeria) Orji Okwonkwo	Bologna	Cittadella	Loan
24 July 2021	Pierluigi Gollini	Atalanta	(England) Tottenham	Loan
24 July 2021	Giacomo Siniega	Empoli	Grosseto	Loan
24 July 2021	Davide Merola	Empoli	Foggia	Loan
24 July 2021	(Denmark) Jens Odgaard	Sassuolo	(Netherlands) RKC Waalwijk	Loan
26 July 2021	(Senegal) Mamadou Coulibaly	Udinese	Salernitana	Loan
26 July 2021	Francesco Donati	Empoli	Juve Stabia	Loan
27 July 2021	Giuseppe Pezzella	Parma	Atalanta	Loan
27 July 2021	Christian Capone	Atalanta	Ternana	Loan
27 July 2021	Gabriele Capanni	Milan	Ternana	Loan
27 July 2021	Alexis Ferrante	Ternana	Foggia	Loan
27 July 2021	(Angola) Zito Luvumbo	Cagliari	Como	Loan
27 July 2021	Samuele Mulattieri	Inter	Crotone	Loan
27 July 2021	Gabriel Meli	Empoli	Südtirol	Loan
27 July 2021	Matteo Ruggeri	Atalanta	Salernitana	Loan
28 July 2021	Alessio Zerbin	Napoli	Frosinone	Loan
28 July 2021	(France) Gabriel Charpentier	Genoa	Frosinone	Loan
28 July 2021	(Finland) Përparim Hetemaj	Benevento	Reggina	Free
28 July 2021	Andrea Seculin	Chievo	S.P.A.L.	Free
28 July 2021	(Croatia) Marko Pjaca	Juventus	Torino	Loan
28 July 2021	(Spain) Álvaro Martí	(Spain) Espanyol	Lecce	Undisclosed
29 July 2021	Arturo Calabresi	Bologna	Lecce	Undisclosed
29 July 2021	(France) Valentin Gendrey	(France) Amiens	Lecce	Undisclosed
29 July 2021	Valerio Mantovani	Salernitana	Alessandria	Undisclosed
29 July 2021	(Belgium) Tibo Persyn	Inter	(Belgium) Club Brugge	Loan
30 July 2021	Ludovico D'Orazio	Roma	S.P.A.L.	Undisclosed
30 July 2021	Mirko Antonucci	Roma	Cittadella	Undisclosed
30 July 2021	(North Macedonia) Leonard Zuta	Lecce	(Norway) Vålerenga	Undisclosed
30 July 2021	Gianluca Frabotta	Juventus	Verona	Loan
30 July 2021	Riccardo Marchizza	Sassuolo	Empoli	Loan
30 July 2021	(Iceland) Arnór Sigurðsson	(Russia) CSKA Moscow	Venezia	Loan
30 July 2021	(Croatia) Filip Bradarić	Cagliari	(Saudi Arabia) Al Ahli	Loan
31 July 2021	Matteo Lovato	Verona	Atalanta	Undisclosed
31 July 2021	Niccolò Chiorra	Empoli	Taranto	Loan
31 July 2021	Lorenzo Colombo	Milan	S.P.A.L.	Loan
31 July 2021	(Mali) Lassana Coulibaly	(France) Angers	Salernitana	Free
31 July 2021	(Tunisia) Wajdi Kechrida	(Tunisia) ÉS Sahel	Salernitana	Free
31 July 2021	Vittorio Parigini	Genoa	Como	Loan
31 July 2021	Patrick Ciurria	Pordenone	Monza	Undisclosed
2 August 2021	(Uzbekistan) Eldor Shomurodov	Genoa	Roma	€17,5m
2 August 2021	(Brazil) Lucas Felippe	Verona	(Portugal) Farense	Undisclosed
3 August 2021	Salvatore Sirigu	Torino	Genoa	Free
3 August 2021	(Morocco) Hamza El Kaouakibi	Bologna	Pordenone	Undisclosed
3 August 2021	Francesco Orlando	Salernitana	Alessandria	Loan
3 August 2021	(Uruguay) Juan Manuel Ramos	Spezia	(Uruguay) Peñarol	Undisclosed
3 August 2021	Federico Bonazzoli	Sampdoria	Salernitana	Undisclosed
3 August 2021	(Argentina) Franco Ferrari	Napoli	Pescara	Loan
3 August 2021	Eugenio D'Ursi	Napoli	Pescara	Loan
3 August 2021	Michele Marconi	Pisa	Alessandria	Undisclosed
3 August 2021	Simone Benedetti	Pisa	Alessandria	Undisclosed
3 August 2021	Stefano Scognamillo	Alessandria	Catanzaro	Undisclosed
3 August 2021	(Brazil) Eric Botteghin	(Netherlands) Feyenoord	Ascoli	Free
4 August 2021	Francesco Rillo	Benevento	Teramo	Loan
4 August 2021	Marco Cuccurullo	Benevento	Teramo	Undisclosed
4 August 2021	(Serbia) Filip Stanković	Inter	(Netherlands) Volendam	Loan
4 August 2021	(Austria) Marko Arnautović	(China) Shanghai Port	Bologna	Undisclosed
4 August 2021	(Poland) Mariusz Stępiński	Verona	(Cyprus) Aris Limassol	Loan
4 August 2021	Guido Marilungo	Ternana	Pescara	Loan
4 August 2021	(Denmark) Frederik Sørensen	Pescara	Ternana	Undisclosed
4 August 2021	Tommaso Cancellotti	Perugia	Pescara	Undisclosed
4 August 2021	(Slovakia) Juraj Kucka	Parma	(England) Watford	Loan
5 August 2021	Giovanni Volpicelli	Benevento	Paganese	Undisclosed
5 August 2021	Francesco Perlingieri	Benevento	Paganese	Loan
5 August 2021	Iacopo Cernigoi	Salernitana	Seregno	Loan
5 August 2021	(Germany) Lazar Samardžić	(Germany) RB Leipzig	Udinese	Undisclosed
5 August 2021	Christian Langella	Pisa	Monopoli	Loan
5 August 2021	Christian Sussi	Pisa	Paganese	Loan
5 August 2021	(France) Maxime Leverbe	Chievo	Pisa	Free
5 August 2021	Davide Di Quinzio	Alessandria	Pisa	Undisclosed
5 August 2021	Andrea Beghetto	Pisa	Alessandria	Loan
5 August 2021	Alessandro Salvi	Frosinone	Ascoli	Free
6 August 2021	Gennaro Acampora	Spezia	Benevento	Free
6 August 2021	Vincenzo Fiorillo	Pescara	Salernitana	Undisclosed
6 August 2021	(Turkey) Merih Demiral	Juventus	Atalanta	Loan
6 August 2021	(Argentina) Cristian Romero	Juventus	Atalanta	€16m
6 August 2021	(Argentina) Cristian Romero	Atalanta	(England) Tottenham	Loan
6 August 2021	Amato Ciciretti	Napoli	Pordenone	Undisclosed
6 August 2021	(Albania) Elvis Kabashi	Renate	Como	Undisclosed
7 August 2021	(The Gambia) Ebrima Colley	Atalanta	Spezia	Loan
7 August 2021	(Brazil) Hernani	Parma	Genoa	Loan
7 August 2021	Pasquale Schiattarella	Benevento	Parma	Undisclosed
7 August 2021	(Ghana) Caleb Ekuban	(Turkey) Trabzonspor	Genoa	Undisclosed
7 August 2021	(France) Abou Ba	(France) Nantes	Alessandria	Loan
8 August 2021	(Ukraine) Viktor Kovalenko	Atalanta	Spezia	Loan
8 August 2021	(Uruguay) Matías Viña	(Brazil) Palmeiras	Roma	€13m
8 August 2021	Nicholas Rizzo	Genoa	(Belgium) Virton	Loan
9 August 2021	Mattia Caldara	Milan	Venezia	Loan
9 August 2021	(Albania) Ardian Ismajli	Spezia	Empoli	Undisclosed
9 August 2021	(Greece) Dimitris Nikolaou	Empoli	Spezia	Undisclosed
9 August 2021	(Slovakia) Samuel Mráz	Empoli	Spezia	Undisclosed
9 August 2021	(United States) Gianluca Busio	(United States) Sporting Kansas City	Venezia	Undisclosed
9 August 2021	Claud Adjapong	Sassuolo	Reggina	Loan
9 August 2021	(Poland) Filip Jagiełło	Genoa	Brescia	Loan
9 August 2021	(Tunisia) Montassar Talbi	Benevento	(Russia) Rubin Kazan	Loan
10 August 2021	Riccardo Boscolo Chio	Inter	Imolese	Loan
10 August 2021	Gaetano Oristanio	Inter	(Netherlands) Volendam	Loan
10 August 2021	Ettore Gliozzi	Monza	Como	Undisclosed
10 August 2021	(Norway) Jens Petter Hauge	Milan	(Germany) Eintracht Frankfurt	Loan
10 August 2021	(Denmark) Andreas Cornelius	Parma	(Turkey) Trabzonspor	Undisclosed
10 August 2021	(Brazil) Felipe Curcio	Salernitana	Padova	Undisclosed
10 August 2021	Nicolò Armini	Lazio	Piacenza	Loan
10 August 2021	Michael Folorunsho	Napoli	Pordenone	Loan
11 August 2021	(Scotland) Liam Henderson	Lecce	Empoli	Undisclosed
11 August 2021	Tommaso Fantacci	Empoli	Gubbio	Loan
11 August 2021	(Croatia) Adrian Šemper	Chievo	Genoa	Free
11 August 2021	Alfredo Donnarumma	Brescia	Ternana	Loan
11 August 2021	(France) Salim Diakite	Teramo	Ternana	Undisclosed
11 August 2021	Andrea Tozzo	Ternana	Teramo	Loan
11 August 2021	(Israel) Yonatan Cohen	(Israel) Maccabi Tel Aviv	Pisa	Undisclosed
11 August 2021	(The Gambia) Bamba Susso	Pisa	VillaValle	Loan
11 August 2021	Andrea Cisco	Novara	Pisa	Free
11 August 2021	(Brazil) Matheus Henrique	(Brazil) Grêmio	Sassuolo	Loan
11 August 2021	(Brazil) Ruan	(Brazil) Grêmio	Sassuolo	Undisclosed
11 August 2021	(Brazil) Ruan	Sassuolo	(Brazil) Grêmio	Loan
12 August 2021	(Belgium) Romelu Lukaku	Inter	(England) Chelsea	Undisclosed
12 August 2021	Stefano Moreo	Empoli	Brescia	Loan
12 August 2021	Michele Cavion	Salernitana	Brescia	Loan
12 August 2021	(Netherlands) Reda Boultam	Salernitana	Cosenza	Loan
12 August 2021	(Nigeria) David Okereke	(Belgium) Club Brugge	Venezia	Loan
12 August 2021	(Sweden) Oscar Linnér	(Germany) Arminia Bielefeld	Brescia	Loan
12 August 2021	(Serbia) Ivan Ilić	(England) Manchester City	Verona	Undisclosed
12 August 2021	(Brazil) Gabriel Strefezza	S.P.A.L.	Lecce	Undisclosed
13 August 2021	Patrick Cutrone	(England) Wolverhampton	Empoli	Loan
13 August 2021	Sebastiano Luperto	Napoli	Empoli	Loan
13 August 2021	Gennaro Tutino	Napoli	Parma	Loan
13 August 2021	(Portugal) Félix Correia	Juventus	Parma	Loan
13 August 2021	Alessandro Vogliacco	Pordenone	Genoa	Undisclosed
13 August 2021	Alessandro Vogliacco	Genoa	Benevento	Loan
13 August 2021	(Senegal) Assan Seck	Pescara	Pisa	Undisclosed
13 August 2021	Gianmarco Ingrosso	Pisa	Pescara	Undisclosed
13 August 2021	Massimo Bertagnoli	Chievo	Brescia	Free
13 August 2021	Andrea Cagnano	Novara	Como	Free
14 August 2021	(Bosnia and Herzegovina) Edin Džeko	Roma	Inter	Undisclosed
14 August 2021	(Netherlands) Denzel Dumfries	(Netherlands) PSV Eindhoven	Inter	Undisclosed
14 August 2021	(Belgium) Radja Nainggolan	Inter	(Belgium) Antwerp	Free
14 August 2021	(Cyprus) Grigoris Kastanos	Juventus	Salernitana	Loan
15 August 2021	Alessandro Tripaldelli	Cagliari	S.P.A.L.	Loan
16 August 2021	(Mexico) Johan Vásquez	(Mexico) Pumas	Genoa	Loan
16 August 2021	Elia Petrelli	Genoa	Ascoli	Loan
17 August 2021	(Croatia) Mirko Marić	Monza	Crotone	Loan
17 August 2021	(England) Tammy Abraham	(England) Chelsea	Roma	€40m
17 August 2021	Marco Tumminello	Atalanta	Reggina	Loan
17 August 2021	Pietro Rovaglia	Chievo	Ternana	Free
17 August 2021	Pietro Rovaglia	Ternana	Fermana	Loan
17 August 2021	(Slovakia) Ľubomír Tupta	Verona	(Czech Republic) Slovan Liberec	Loan
17 August 2021	Alberto Cerri	Cagliari	Como	Loan
17 August 2021	Davide Riccardi	Lecce	Triestina	Undisclosed
17 August 2021	Christian Celesia	Torino	Alessandria	Loan
18 August 2021	Edoardo Sottini	Inter	Pistoiese	Loan
18 August 2021	Lorenzo Moretti	Inter	Pistoiese	Loan
18 August 2021	Marco Carraro	Atalanta	Cosenza	Loan
18 August 2021	Manuel Locatelli	Sassuolo	Juventus	2-year loan
18 August 2021	(Brazil) Juan Jesus	Roma	Napoli	Loan
18 August 2021	Nikita Contini	Napoli	Crotone	Loan
18 August 2021	Andrea Marino	Lazio	Piacenza	Loan
18 August 2021	Simone Palombi	Lazio	Alessandria	Loan
18 August 2021	(France) Mehdi Léris	Sampdoria	Brescia	Loan
18 August 2021	(Argentina) Rodrigo Palacio	Bologna	Brescia	Free
18 August 2021	(Bulgaria) Andrey Galabinov	Spezia	Reggina	Free
18 August 2021	Antonino La Gumina	Sampdoria	Como	Loan
19 August 2021	(Sweden) Elvis Lindqvist	Inter	Torino	Loan
19 August 2021	(Nigeria) Simy	Crotone	Salernitana	Loan
19 August 2021	(Argentina) Germán Pezzella	Fiorentina	(Spain) Betis	Undisclosed
19 August 2021	(Sweden) Aimar Sher	(Sweden) Hammarby	Spezia	Undisclosed
19 August 2021	Jacopo Petriccione	Crotone	Pordenone	Loan
19 August 2021	(Albania) Elseid Hysaj	Napoli	Lazio	Free
19 August 2021	(Argentina) Luka Romero	(Spain) Mallorca	Lazio	Undisclosed
19 August 2021	(Greece) Nikolaos Baxevanos	Lazio	(Romania) Chindia Târgoviște	Undisclosed
19 August 2021	(Albania) Sergio Kalaj	Lazio	Carrarese	Undisclosed
19 August 2021	Mattia Novella	Lazio	Monopoli	Undisclosed
20 August 2021	Giacomo Pozzer	Inter	Juve Stabia	Undisclosed
20 August 2021	Luca Magazzu	Inter	Empoli	Undisclosed
20 August 2021	Thomas Schirò	Inter	Crotone	Undisclosed
20 August 2021	(France) Sanasi Sy	Salernitana	Cosenza	Undisclosed
20 August 2021	Christian Dalle Mura	Fiorentina	Cremonese	Loan
20 August 2021	Elio Capradossi	Spezia	S.P.A.L.	Loan
20 August 2021	(Czech Republic) Jakub Jankto	Sampdoria	(Spain) Getafe	Undisclosed
20 August 2021	Marco Mancosu	Lecce	S.P.A.L.	Undisclosed
20 August 2021	Danilo Giacinto Ventola	Ascoli	Virtus Francavilla	Loan
21 August 2021	Alessandro Florenzi	Roma	Milan	Loan
21 August 2021	Alberto Grassi	Parma	Cagliari	Loan
21 August 2021	(Serbia) Matija Nastasić	(Germany) Schalke 04	Fiorentina	Undisclosed
21 August 2021	(Ivory Coast) Christian Kouamé	Fiorentina	(Belgium) Anderlecht	Loan
21 August 2021	Leonardo Ubaldi	Pisa	Pistoiese	Loan
22 August 2021	(France) William Bianda	Roma	(France) Nancy	Loan
23 August 2021	(Spain) Pol Lirola	Fiorentina	(France) OM	Undisclosed
23 August 2021	(Iceland) Andri Baldursson	Bologna	(Denmark) Copenhagen	Loan
23 August 2021	Bruno Martella	Brescia	Ternana	Undisclosed
23 August 2021	Giacomo Manzari	Sassuolo	Frosinone	2-year loan
23 August 2021	Giuseppe Barone	Unattached	Ascoli	Free
24 August 2021	Samuel Di Carmine	Verona	Cremonese	Undisclosed
24 August 2021	(France) Thomas Henry	(Belgium) OH Leuven	Venezia	Undisclosed
24 August 2021	(Croatia) Ante Ćorić	Roma	(Switzerland) Zürich	Loan
24 August 2021	Davide Zappacosta	(England) Chelsea	Atalanta	Undisclosed
24 August 2021	(Czech Republic) David Heidenreich	Atalanta	S.P.A.L.	Loan
24 August 2021	Jacopo Da Riva	Atalanta	S.P.A.L.	Loan
24 August 2021	(Germany) Lennart Czyborra	Genoa	(Germany) Arminia Bielefeld	Loan
24 August 2021	Mattia D'Agostino	Ascoli	Monopoli	Loan
24 August 2021	Andrea De Paoli	Monopoli	Ascoli	Loan
25 August 2021	(Croatia) Boško Šutalo	Atalanta	Verona	Loan
25 August 2021	(Portugal) Alexandre Pimenta	Venezia	(Portugal) Leixões	Loan
25 August 2021	Andrea Pinamonti	Inter	Empoli	Loan
25 August 2021	Lorenzo Colombini	Spezia	Giana Erminio	Loan
25 August 2021	(France) Janis Antiste	(France) Giana Erminio	Spezia	Undisclosed
25 August 2021	(Brazil) Lyanco	Torino	(England) Southampton	Undisclosed
25 August 2021	(Croatia) Toma Bašić	(France) Bordeaux	Lazio	Undisclosed
25 August 2021	(Uruguay) Lucas Torreira	(England) Arsenal	Fiorentina	Loan
25 August 2021	(Argentina) Nahuel Estévez	(Argentina) Estudiantes	Crotone	Loan
25 August 2021	Tommaso Milanese	Roma	Alessandria	Loan
25 August 2021	(Netherlands) Stefano Denswil	Bologna	(Turkey) Trabzonspor	Loan
26 August 2021	(Nigeria) Isaac Success	(England) Watford	Udinese	Undisclosed
26 August 2021	(Argentina) Joaquín Correa	Lazio	Inter	Loan
26 August 2021	(Argentina) Giovanni Simeone	Cagliari	Verona	Loan
26 August 2021	(Belgium) Arthur Theate	(Belgium) Oostende	Bologna	Loan
26 August 2021	Manuel De Luca	Sampdoria	Perugia	Loan
26 August 2021	(Bulgaria) Atanas Iliev	(Bulgaria) Botev Plovdiv	Ascoli	Undisclosed
26 August 2021	(Argentina) Franco Zuculini	(Uruguay) Defensor Sporting	S.P.A.L.	Free
26 August 2021	(Algeria) Karim Zedadka	Napoli	(Belgium) Charleroi	Loan
26 August 2021	Filippo Neri	Livorno	Venezia	Free
27 August 2021	Lorenzo Tonelli	Sampdoria	Empoli	Undisclosed
27 August 2021	(Ghana) Godfred Donsah	Bologna	Crotone	Free
27 August 2021	(Senegal) Fallou Sarr	Bologna	Cremonese	Undisclosed
27 August 2021	(Slovenia) Žan Celar	Roma	(Switzerland) Lugano	Undisclosed
27 August 2021	(Portugal) Cristiano Ronaldo	Juventus	(England) Manchester United	€15m
27 August 2021	(Norway) Martin Palumbo	Udinese	Juventus U23	Loan
27 August 2021	(Argentina) Nehuén Paz	Bologna	Crotone	Undisclosed
27 August 2021	(Bulgaria) Valentin Antov	(Bulgaria) CSKA Sofia	Monza	Loan
27 August 2021	(Hungary) Ádám Nagy	(England) Bristol City	Pisa	Undisclosed
27 August 2021	Thomas Alberti	Pisa	Fidelis Andria	Loan
27 August 2021	(Estonia) Georgi Tunjov	S.P.A.L.	Carrarese	Loan
27 August 2021	Raffaele Celia	Sassuolo	S.P.A.L.	Undisclosed
27 August 2021	Alberto Pomini	Venezia	S.P.A.L.	Free
27 August 2021	Tommaso Pobega	Milan	Torino	Loan
27 August 2021	(Sweden) Emil Holm	(Denmark) SønderjyskE	Spezia	Undisclosed
27 August 2021	(Montenegro) Ognjen Stijepović	Sampdoria	Spezia	Undisclosed
27 August 2021	(Montenegro) Ognjen Stijepović	Spezia	Pistoiese	Loan
27 August 2021	Simone Canestrelli	Empoli	Crotone	Loan
27 August 2021	Antonio Barreca	Monaco	Lecce	Loan
27 August 2021	Francesco Di Mariano	Venezia	Lecce	Undisclosed
27 August 2021	(Iceland) Óttar Magnús Karlsson	Venezia	Siena	Loan
27 August 2021	Riccardo Moreo	Cosenza	Pergolettese	Undisclosed
28 August 2021	(Belgium) Elias Cobbaut	(Belgium) Anderlecht	Parma	Loan
28 August 2021	(Argentina) Nehuén Pérez	(Spain) Atlético Madrid	Udinese	Loan
28 August 2021	(Spain) Cristo González	Udinese	(Spain) Valladolid	Loan
28 August 2021	(Spain) Álvaro Odriozola	(Spain) Real Madrid	Fiorentina	Loan
28 August 2021	Michele Vano	Perugia	Pistoiese	Loan
28 August 2021	Giovanni Di Noia	Perugia	Fidelis Andria	Loan
28 August 2021	Luca Matarese	Frosinone	Imolese	Loan
28 August 2021	Mauro Vigorito	Lecce	Cosenza	Undisclosed
28 August 2021	Nicholas Galazzi	Venezia	Triestina	Loan
29 August 2021	(Poland) Arkadiusz Reca	Atalanta	Spezia	Loan
30 August 2021	Mario Gargiulo	Cittadella	Lecce	Undisclosed
30 August 2021	(Albania) Kastriot Dermaku	Parma	Lecce	Undisclosed
30 August 2021	(Portugal) Leandro Sanca	(Portugal) Braga	Spezia	Undisclosed
30 August 2021	(Portugal) Leandro Sanca	Spezia	(Portugal) Casa Pia	Loan
30 August 2021	Alessandro Bordin	Spezia	Fidelis Andria	Undisclosed
30 August 2021	(Morocco) Mehdi Bourabia	Sassuolo	Spezia	Loan
30 August 2021	(Iceland) Mikael Egill Ellertsson	S.P.A.L.	Spezia	Undisclosed
30 August 2021	(Iceland) Mikael Egill Ellertsson	Spezia	S.P.A.L.	Loan
30 August 2021	(Netherlands) Teun Koopmeiners	(Netherlands) AZ Alkmaar	Atalanta	Loan
30 August 2021	(Croatia) Karlo Lulić	(Croatia) Slaven Belupo	Frosinone	Loan
30 August 2021	Matteo Ricci	Spezia	Frosinone	Free
30 August 2021	Mario De Marino	Venezia	Fidelis Andria	Loan
30 August 2021	(France) Tiémoué Bakayoko	(England) Chelsea	Milan	Loan
30 August 2021	(Morocco) Sofian Kiyine	Lazio	Venezia	Loan
30 August 2021	Stefano Cester	Inter	Vicenza	Undisclosed
30 August 2021	(France) Woyo Coulibaly	(France) Le Havre	Parma	Undisclosed
30 August 2021	(Netherlands) Djavan Anderson	Lazio	Cosenza	Loan
30 August 2021	(Brazil) Kaique Rocha	Sampdoria	(Brazil) Internacional	2-year loan
30 August 2021	(Slovakia) Lukáš Haraslín	Sassuolo	(Czech Republic) Sparta Prague	Loan
31 August 2021	Edoardo Vergani	Inter	Salernitana	Undisclosed
31 August 2021	David Wieser	Inter	Bologna	Loan
31 August 2021	Alessandro Cortinovis	Atalanta	Reggina	Loan
31 August 2021	(France) Leroy Abanda	Milan	(France) Boulogne	Loan
31 August 2021	Moise Kean	(England) Everton	Juventus	2-year loan
31 August 2021	Filippo Delli Carri	Juventus	Salernitana	Loan
31 August 2021	Filippo Ranocchia	Juventus	Vicenza	Loan
31 August 2021	Enrico Del Prato	Atalanta	Parma	Loan
31 August 2021	(France) Ange-Yoan Bonny	(France) Châteauroux	Parma	Undisclosed
31 August 2021	(Bosnia and Herzegovina) Mirza Hasanbegović	Venezia	(Croatia) Gorica	Loan
31 August 2021	Luca Vignali	Spezia	Como	Loan
31 August 2021	(Venezuela) Kevin Agudelo	Genoa	Spezia	Loan
31 August 2021	(Albania) Kleis Bozhanaj	Empoli	Spezia	Undisclosed
31 August 2021	(Albania) Kleis Bozhanaj	Spezia	(Portugal) Casa Pia	Loan
31 August 2021	(Slovakia) David Strelec	(Slovakia) Slovan Bratislava	Spezia	Undisclosed
31 August 2021	(Poland) Jakub Kiwior	(Slovakia) Žilina	Spezia	Undisclosed
31 August 2021	(Albania) Rey Manaj	(Spain) Barcelona	Spezia	Loan
31 August 2021	Mattia Zaccagni	Verona	Lazio	Loan
31 August 2021	Angelo Ndrecka	Lazio	Teramo	Loan
31 August 2021	Angelo Ndrecka	Lazio	Teramo	Loan
31 August 2021	(Argentina) Tiago Casasola	Lazio	Frosinone	Loan
31 August 2021	(Ecuador) Felipe Caicedo	Lazio	Genoa	Undisclosed
31 August 2021	(Algeria) Mohamed Farès	Lazio	Genoa	Loan
31 August 2021	Emanuele Cicerelli	Lazio	Frosinone	Loan
31 August 2021	(France) Lucien Agoumé	Inter	(France) Brest	Loan
31 August 2021	(Austria) Valentino Lazaro	Inter	(Portugal) Benfica	Loan
31 August 2021	(France) Étienne Kinkoue	Inter	(Greece) Olympiacos	Undisclosed
31 August 2021	Riccardo Ciervo	Roma	Sampdoria	Loan
31 August 2021	(Colombia) Jeison Murillo	Sampdoria	(Spain) Vigo	Loan
31 August 2021	Luca Marrone	Crotone	Monza	Undisclosed
31 August 2021	Andrea Favilli	Genoa	Monza	Loan
31 August 2021	Armando Anastasio	Monza	Reggiana	Loan
31 August 2021	Marco Fossati	Monza	(Croatia) Hajduk Split	Undisclosed
31 August 2021	Stefano Negro	Monza	Triestina	Undisclosed
31 August 2021	Andrea Palazzi	Monza	Alessandria	Undisclosed
31 August 2021	(Cameroon) André-Frank Zambo Anguissa	(England) Fulham	Napoli	Loan
31 August 2021	(France) Zinédine Machach	Napoli	(Hungary) Honvéd	Loan
31 August 2021	Gianluca Gaetano	Napoli	Cremonese	Loan
31 August 2021	Luca Palmiero	Napoli	Cosenza	Loan
31 August 2021	(Norway) Julian Kristoffersen	Salernitana	Cosenza	Loan
31 August 2021	(France) Steeve-Mike Eyango	Genoa	Cosenza	Loan
31 August 2021	(Croatia) Mario Šitum	Reggina	Cosenza	Loan
31 August 2021	Roberto Pirrello	Empoli	Cosenza	Loan
31 August 2021	Luca Pandolfi	Turris	Cosenza	Undisclosed
31 August 2021	Vincenzo Millico	Torino	Cosenza	Loan
31 August 2021	(Kosovo) Samir Ujkani	Torino	Empoli	Free
31 August 2021	Federico Di Francesco	S.P.A.L.	Empoli	Loan
31 August 2021	Alberto Brignoli	Empoli	(Greece) Panathinaikos	Loan
31 August 2021	Kevin Piscopo	Empoli	S.P.A.L.	Loan
31 August 2021	Giovanni Crociata	Empoli	S.P.A.L.	Loan
31 August 2021	Francesco Caputo	Sassuolo	Sampdoria	Loan
31 August 2021	(Romania) Radu Drăgușin	Juventus	Sampdoria	Loan
31 August 2021	(Netherlands) Mohamed Ihattaren	(Netherlands) PSV Eindhoven	Juventus	Loan
31 August 2021	(Netherlands) Mohamed Ihattaren	Juventus	Sampdoria	Loan
31 August 2021	Gianluca Caprari	Sampdoria	Verona	Loan
31 August 2021	Marco Frediani	Alessandria	Fermana	Undisclosed
31 August 2021	Edoardo Blondett	Alessandria	Fermana	Undisclosed
31 August 2021	Umberto Eusepi	Alessandria	Juve Stabia	Loan
31 August 2021	Francesco Giorno	Alessandria	Triestina	Loan
31 August 2021	Simone Andrea Ganz	Ascoli	Lecco	Loan
31 August 2021	Amine Ghazoini	Ascoli	(Belgium) Virton	Loan
31 August 2021	Gian Filippo Felicioli	Venezia	Ascoli	Loan
31 August 2021	(France) Abdoulaye Touré	(France) Nantes	Genoa	Undisclosed
31 August 2021	(Serbia) Nikola Maksimović	Napoli	Genoa	Free
31 August 2021	(Wales) Ethan Ampadu	(England) Chelsea	Venezia	Loan
31 August 2021	(United States) Jack de Vries	(United States) Philadelphia Union	Venezia	Loan
31 August 2021	(Suriname) Ridgeciano Haps	(Netherlands) Feyenoord	Venezia	Undisclosed
31 August 2021	(France) Anthony Taugourdeau	Venezia	Vicenza	Undisclosed
31 August 2021	Eddie Salcedo	Genoa	Spezia	Loan
31 August 2021	(Netherlands) Sam Lammers	Atalanta	(Germany) Eintracht Frankfurt	Loan
31 August 2021	Nicola Rauti	Torino	Pescara	Loan
31 August 2021	Jacopo Segre	Torino	Perugia	Loan
31 August 2021	(Czech Republic) David Zima	(Czech Republic) Slavia Prague	Torino	Undisclosed
31 August 2021	(Belgium) Dennis Praet	(England) Leicester	Torino	Loan
31 August 2021	(Croatia) Josip Brekalo	(Germany) VfL Wolfsburg	Torino	Loan
31 August 2021	Raoul Bellanova	(France) Bordeaux	Cagliari	Loan
31 August 2021	(Senegal) Keita Baldé	Monaco	Cagliari	Undisclosed
31 August 2021	Simone Pinna	Cagliari	Olbia	Undisclosed
31 August 2021	Enrico Brignola	Sassuolo	Benevento	Loan
31 August 2021	Nicholas Pierini	Sassuolo	Cesena	Undisclosed
31 August 2021	(Croatia) Martin Erlić	Spezia	Sassuolo	Undisclosed
31 August 2021	(Croatia) Martin Erlić	Sassuolo	Spezia	Loan
31 August 2021	Marco Pinato	Sassuolo	Pordenone	Loan
31 August 2021	Andrea Ghion	Sassuolo	Perugia	Loan
31 August 2021	Andrea Meroni	Sassuolo	Cremonese	Loan
31 August 2021	Brian Oddei	Sassuolo	Crotone	Loan
31 August 2021	(Uruguay) Nicolás Schiappacasse	(Uruguay) Peñarol	Sassuolo	Loan return
31 August 2021	(Romania) Andrei Mărginean	Sassuolo	Messina	Loan
31 August 2021	(Netherlands) Abdou Harroui	(Netherlands) Sparta Rotterdam	Sassuolo	Loan
31 August 2021	(Netherlands) Djenairo Daniels	(Netherlands) Utrecht	Sassuolo	Loan
1 September 2021	(Uruguay) Martín Cáceres	Unattached	Cagliari	Free
1 September 2021	Tommaso Aglietti	Unattached	Reggina	Free
2 September 2021	(Chile) Pablo Galdames	Unattached	Genoa	Free
2 September 2021	(Slovakia) Samuel Mráz	Spezia	(Slovakia) Slovan Bratislava	Loan
4 September 2021	(France) Matthieu Huard	Unattached	Brescia	Free
6 September 2021	(France) Franck Ribéry	Unattached	Salernitana	Free
8 September 2021	Stefano Okaka	Udinese	(Turkey) Başakşehir	Undisclosed
17 September 2021	(Ivory Coast) Cedric Gondo	Lazio	Salernitana	Free
28 September 2021	(France) Aurélien Nguiamba	Unattached	Spezia	Free
