= 2020 Coppa Italia Serie C final =

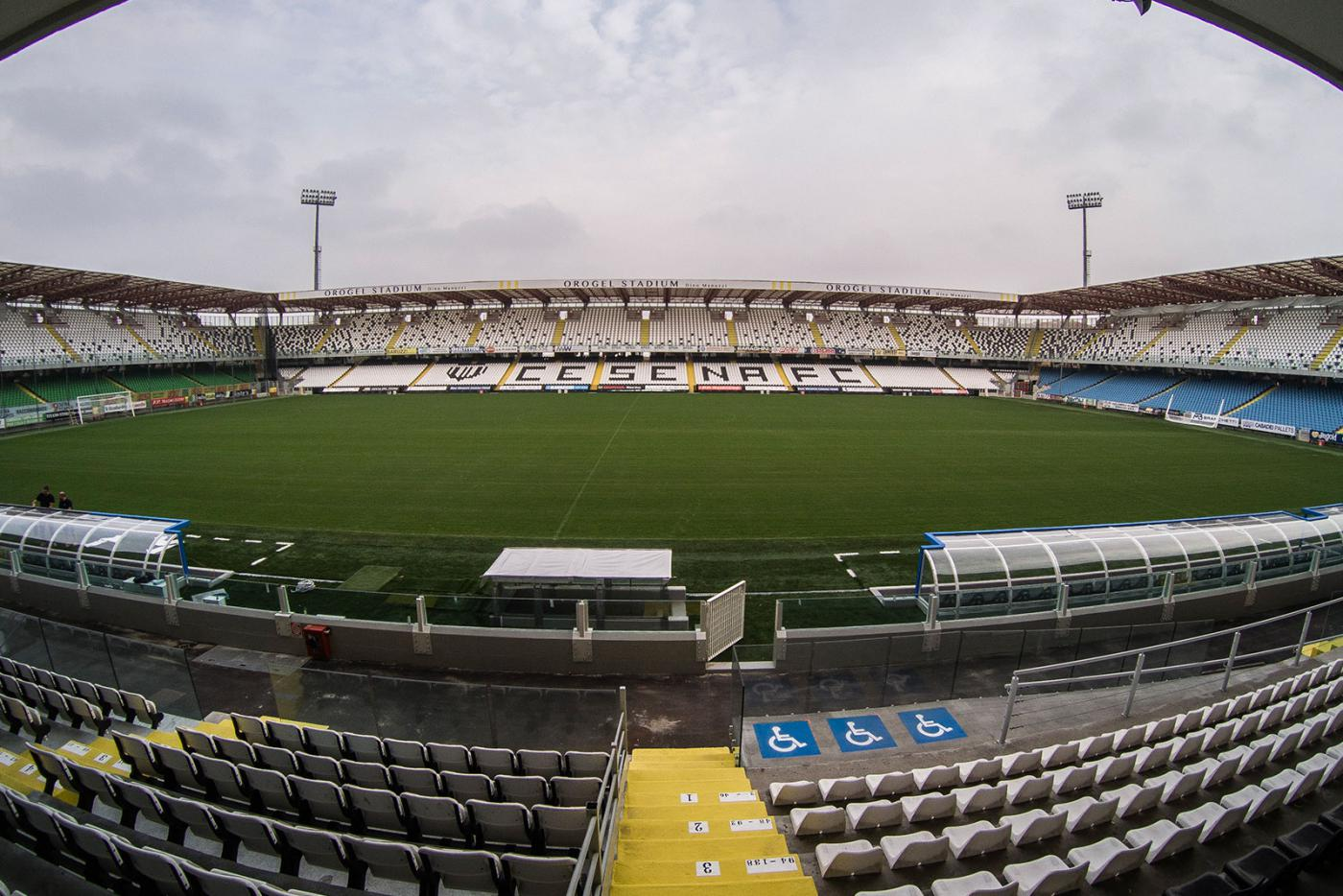
- The Stadio Dino Manuzzi in Cesena hosted the match
- Event: 2019–20 Coppa Italia Serie C
Ternana	Juventus U23
1	2
- Date: 27 June 2020
- Venue: Stadio Dino Manuzzi, Cesena
- Referee: Daniele Paterna
- Attendance: 0 (Note: Match played behind closed doors due to the COVID-19 pandemic in Italy.)

The 2020 Coppa Italia Serie C Final was an association football match between Ternana and Juventus U23 on 27 June 2020 at Stadio Dino Manuzzi in Cesena, Italy. It was the first Coppa Italia Serie C final for both teams.

The match was played behind closed doors due to the COVID-19 pandemic in Italy. It was also due to be played in two legs according the tournament's regulation. However, on 20 June 2020, Lega Pro decided to play the final as a single match in Cesena.

Ternana's Carlo Mammarella scored the first goal in the sixth minute through a free kick. Six minutes later, Matteo Brunori was brought down in the Ternana box and Paterna awarded a penalty. Brunori, scored from the spot to make it 1–1. At the end of the first half, Hamza Rafia scored Juventus U23's second goal after the Antony Iannarilli's save on Brunori's shot and Rafia's rebound. The match ended 2–1 and Juventus U23 won their first trophy of team's history.

As winners, Juventus U23 had a bye for the first two rounds of Serie C promotion play-offs, qualifying to round of 16. The 2020–21 season of the Coppa Italia Serie C will be cancelled due to the COVID-19 pandemic in Italy.

== Match ==
27 June 2020
20:45 CEST

Ternana	1–2	Juventus U23
Mammarella 6'	Report	Brunori 12' (pen.); Rafia 45+1'

Stadio Dino Manuzzi, Cesena
Attendance: 0
Referee: Paterna (Teramo)

GK	24	(Italy) Antony Iannarilli
RB	11	(Italy) Luca Parodi
CB	14	(Italy) Michele Russo
CB	2	(Italy) Alessandro Celli
LB	15	(Italy) Carlo Mammarella (c)		(substituted off) 89'
CM	4	(Italy) Luca Verna		(substituted off) 60'
CM	5	(Italy) Antonio Palumbo
CM	4	(Italy) Fabrizio Paghera		(substituted off) 80'
AM	33	(Italy) Anthony Partipilo		(substituted off) 80'
CF	9	(Italy) Alexis Ferrante
CF	10	(Italy) Daniele Vantaggiato		(substituted off) 60'
Substitutes:
GK	12	(Italy) Richiard Marcone
DF	22	(Italy) Andrea Tozzo
DF	27	(Italy) Dario Bergmamelli
DF	6	(France) Modibo Diakité
DF	23	(Italy) Simone Sini
MF	31	(Italy) Filippo Damian		(substituted on) 89'
MF	25	(Italy) Marino Defendi	Red card	(substituted on) 60'
MF	28	(Italy) Aniello Salzano		(substituted on) 60'
FW	7	(Italy) Federico Furlan		(substituted on) 80'
FW	21	(Italy) Giuseppe Torromino
FW	18	(Italy) Guido Marilungo		(substituted on) 80'
Head coach:
(Italy) Fabio Gallo

Juventus U23

GK	1	(Italy) Timothy Nocchi
RB	18	(Italy) Alessandro Di Pardo	(substituted off) 80'
CB	35	(Italy) Raffaele Alcibiade (c)
CB	3	(Italy) Luca Coccolo
LB	24	(Italy) Gianluca Frabotta
DM	15	(Germany) Idrissa Touré
DM	26	(Italy) Nicolò Fagioli	(substituted off) 80'
AM	27	(Italy) Ferdinando Del Sole	(substituted off) 47'
AM	19	(Tunisia) Hamza Rafia	(substituted off) 65'
AM	7	(Italy) Ettore Marchi
CF	9	(Italy) Matteo Brunori	(substituted off) 58'
Substitutes:
GK	22	(Italy) Leonardo Loria
GK	30	(Italy) Alessandro Siani
DF	33	(Italy) Filippo Delli Carri
DF	31	(Romania) Radu Drăgușin
DF	36	(Italy) Alessandro Minelli
DF	20	(Italy) Pietro Beruatto	(substituted on) 80'
MF	6	(Belgium) Daouda Peeters	(substituted on) 80'
MF	32	(Brazil) Wesley	(substituted on) 47'
MF	8	(Italy) Manolo Portanova	(substituted on) 58'
FW	17	(Italy) Luca Zanimacchia	(substituted on) 65'
FW	14	(Spain) Alejandro Marqués
FW	21	(Albania) Giacomo Vrioni
Head coach
(Italy) Fabio Pecchia

Assistant referees:
Marco Trinchieri
Emanuele Yoshikawa
Fourth official:
Ermanno Feliciani

Match rules

- 90 minutes.
- 30 minutes of extra time if necessary.
- Penalty shoot-out if scores still level.
- Twelve named substitutes, of which up to five may be used. (Note: Each team was given only three opportunities to make substitutions, excluding substitutions made at half-time, before the start of extra time and at half-time in extra time.)
