= 2019–20 AS Livorno Calcio season =

Livorno
2019–20 season
- Chairman: Aldo Spinelli
- Manager: Antonio Filippini
- Stadium: Stadio Armando Picchi
- Serie B: 20th (relegated)
- Coppa Italia: Second round

The 2019–20 season was AS Livorno Calcio's second consecutive season in second division of the Italian football league, the Serie B, and the 105th as a football club.

== Players ==
=== First-team quad ===
As of 6 February 2020.

Note: Flags indicate national team as defined under FIFA eligibility rules; some limited exceptions apply. Players may hold more than one non-FIFA nationality.

No.	Pos.	Nation	Player
1	GK	ITA	Filippo Neri
2	DF	FRA	Andrew Marie-Sainte
4	DF	ITA	Matteo Di Gennaro
5	DF	ITA	Alessandro Coppola
6	DF	ARG	Matías Silvestre
7	FW	ITA	Davide Marsura
8	MF	ITA	Andrea Luci (Captain)
9	FW	NED	Sven Braken
10	MF	ROU	Adrian Stoian
11	FW	BRA	Murilo
14	MF	ITA	Luca Rizzo (on loan from Bologna)
15	MF	ITA	Enrico Del Prato (on loan from Atalanta)
16	MF	ITA	Gennaro Ruggiero
17	DF	ITA	Antonio Porcino
18	FW	ITA	Matteo Pallecchi
19	DF	ITA	Gabriele Morelli
20	FW	ITA	Enrico Brignola (on loan from Sassuolo)

No.	Pos.	Nation	Player
21	MF	ITA	Mattia Trovato (on loan from Fiorentina)
22	GK	ITA	Matteo Ricci
23	DF	SUI	Michel Morganella
24	FW	ITA	Fabio Mazzeo
26	DF	CRO	Luka Bogdan
27	FW	ITA	Franco Ferrari (on loan from Napoli)
29	MF	ITA	Michele Rocca (on loan from Sampdoria)
31	FW	SWE	Robin Simovic
32	MF	ITA	Manuel Marras
34	MF	ITA	Davide Agazzi
35	GK	ITA	Alessandro Plizzari (on loan from Milan)
37	MF	NGR	Theophilus Awua (on loan from Spezia)
38	GK	CZE	Lukáš Zima
39	DF	SWE	Viktor Agardius
42	DF	SLO	Matija Boben
43	MF	ITA	Federico Viviani (on loan from SPAL)
45	DF	SEN	Moustapha Seck (on loan from Roma)

=== Out on loan ===
Note: Flags indicate national team as defined under FIFA eligibility rules; some limited exceptions apply. Players may hold more than one non-FIFA nationality.

No.	Pos.	Nation	Player
—	GK	ITA	Thomas Romboli (at Pergolettese)
—	DF	ITA	Nicolas Bresciani (at Reggiana)
—	DF	ITA	Federico Casanova (at Fezzanese)
—	DF	ITA	Andrea Gasbarro (at Pordenone)
—	DF	ITA	Lorenzo Gonnelli (at Alessandria)
—	DF	ITA	Tino Parisi (at Sicula Leonzio)

No.	Pos.	Nation	Player
—	DF	ITA	Agostino Rizzo (at Avellino)
—	MF	ITA	Santo D'Angelo (at Potenza)
—	FW	ITA	Alessio Canessa (at Pergolettese)
—	FW	ITA	Pasquale Maiorino (at Feralpisalò)
—	FW	MNE	Filip Raičević (at (Poland) Śląsk Wrocław)

== Pre-season and friendlies ==
Win Draw Loss

28 July 2019 Friendly	Gubbio (Italy)	1–1	(Italy) Livorno	Gubbio, Italy
18:00 CEST (UTC+2)		Report		Stadium: Stadio Pietro Barbetti

3 August 2019 Friendly	Livorno (Italy)	0–1	(Italy) Fiorentina	Livorno, Italy
21:00 CEST (UTC+2)		Report	Sottil 15'	Stadium: Stadio Armando Picchi

== Competitions ==
=== Overall record ===
Competition	First match	Last match	Starting round	Final position	Record							
Competition	First match	Last match	Starting round	Final position	Pld	W	D	L	GF	GA	GD	Win %
Serie B	24 August 2019	31 July 2020	Matchday 1	11th	38	5	6	27	30	67	−37	13.16
Coppa Italia	11 August 2019		Second round	Second round	1	0	0	1	0	1	−1	0.00
Total					39	5	6	28	30	68	−38	12.82

Source: Soccerway

=== Serie A ===
==== League table ====
Pos	Team	Pld	W	D	L	GF	GA	GD	Pts	Promotion, qualification or relegation
16	Perugia (R)	38	12	9	17	38	49	−11	45 (Note: Perugia finished ahead of Pescara on head-to-head points: Perugia 3–1 Pescara, Pescara 2–2 Perugia.)	Qualification for relegation play-out
17	Pescara (O)	38	12	9	17	48	55	−7	45	Qualification for relegation play-out
18	Trapani (Note: Deducted 2 points for administrative irregularities.) (R)	38	11	13	14	48	60	−12	44	Relegation to Serie C
19	Juve Stabia (R)	38	11	8	19	47	63	−16	41	Relegation to Serie C
20	Livorno (R)	38	5	6	27	30	67	−37	21	Relegation to Serie C

Source: Lega Serie B (in Italian) SOCCERWAY (in English)
Rules for classification: 1) Points; 2) Head-to-head points; 3) Head-to-head goal difference; 4) Goal difference; 5) Goals scored; 6) Draw.
(O) Play-off winners; (R) Relegated

==== Results summary ====
Overall								Home						Away					
Pld	W	D	L	GF	GA	GD	Pts	W	D	L	GF	GA	GD	W	D	L	GF	GA	GD
0	0	0	0	0	0	0	0	0	0	0	0	0	0	0	0	0	0	0	0

Source: Serie B

==== Results by round ====
Round	1	2	3	4	5	6	7	8	9	10	11	12	13	14	15	16	17	18	19	20	21	22	23	24	25	26	27	28	29	30	31	32	33	34	35	36	37	38
Ground	A	H	A	H	A	H	H	A	H	A	H	A	H	A	A	H	A	H	A	H	A	H	A	H	A	A	H	A	H	A	H	A	H	H	A	H	A	H
Result	L	L	L	W	D	L	L	L	W	L	W	L	L	D	L	L	L	L	D	D	L	L	D	L	L	W	D	L	L	W	L	L	L	L	L	L	L	L
Position	16	17	19	16	16	17	17	20	18	19	18	19	19	20	20	20	20	20	20	20	20	20	20	20	20	20	20	20	20	20	20	20	20	20	20	20	20	20

Source: Serie B
A = Away; H = Home; W = Win; D = Draw; L = Loss

==== Matches ====
The league fixtures were announced on 6 August 2019.

24 August 2019 1	Virtus Entella	1–0	Livorno	Chiavari
21:00 CEST (UTC+2)				Stadium: Stadio Comunale

31 August 2019 2	Livorno	0–1	Perugia	Livorno
21:00 CEST (UTC+2)				Stadium: Stadio Benito Stirpe

14 September 2019 3	Ascoli	2–0	Livorno	Ascoli Piceno
CEST (UTC+2)				Stadium: Stadio Cino e Lillo Del Duca

21 September 2019 4	Livorno	2–1	Pordenone	Livorno
CEST (UTC+2)				Stadium: Stadio Benito Stirpe

24 September 2019 5	Cosenza	1–1	Livorno	Cosenza
CEST (UTC+2)				Stadium: Stadio San Vito-Gigi Marulla

29 September 2019 6	Livorno	2–3	Salernitana	Livorno
CEST (UTC+2)				Stadium: Stadio Benito Stirpe

5 October 2019 7	Livorno	3–4	Chievo	Livorno
CEST (UTC+2)				Stadium: Stadio Benito Stirpe

21 October 2019 8	Frosinone	1–0	Livorno	Frosinone
CEST (UTC+2)				Stadium: Stadio Benito Stirpe

26 October 2019 9	Livorno	1–0	Pisa	Livorno
--:-- CEST (UTC+2)				Stadium: Stadio Benito Stirpe

29 October 2019 10	Cittadella	1–0	Livorno	Cittadella
CET (UTC+1)				Stadium: Stadio Pier Cesare Tombolato

2 November 2019 11	Livorno	2–1	Juve Stabia	Livorno
CET (UTC+1)				Stadium: Stadio Benito Stirpe

9 November 2019 12	Venezia	1–0	Livorno	Venice
CET (UTC+1)				Stadium: Pier Luigi Penzo Stadium

23 November 2019 13	Livorno	1–2	Trapani	Livorno
CET (UTC+1)				Stadium: Stadio Benito Stirpe

30 November 2019 14	Cremonese	0–0	Livorno	Cremona
CET (UTC+1)				Stadium: Stadio Giovanni Zini

7 December 2019 15	Spezia	2–0	Livorno	La Spezia
CET (UTC+1)				Stadium: Alberto Picco

14 December 2019 16	Livorno	0–2	Benevento	Livorno
--:-- CET (UTC+1)				Stadium: Stadio Benito Stirpe

21 December 2019 17	Crotone	2–1	Livorno	Crotone
--:-- CET (UTC+1)				Stadium: Stadio Ezio Scida

26 December 2019 18	Livorno	0–2	Pescara	Livorno
CET (UTC+1)				Stadium: Stadio Benito Stirpe

29 December 2019 19	Empoli	1–1	Livorno	Empoli
--:-- CET (UTC+1)				Stadium: Stadio Carlo Castellani

18 January 2020 20	Livorno	4–4	Virtus Entella	Livorno
CET (UTC+1)				Stadium: Stadio Benito Stirpe

27 January 2020 21	Perugia	1–0	Livorno	Perugia
CET (UTC+1)				Stadium: Stadio Renato Curi

1 February 2020 22	Livorno	0–3	Ascoli	Livorno
CET (UTC+1)				Stadium: Stadio Benito Stirpe

8 February 2020 23	Pordenone	2–2	Livorno	Udine
15:00 CET (UTC+1)				Stadium: Stadio Friuli

15 February 2020 24	Livorno	0–3	Cosenza	Livorno
CET (UTC+1)				Stadium: Stadio Benito Stirpe

23 February 2020 25	Salernitana	1–0	Livorno	Salerno
CET (UTC+1)				Stadium: Stadio Arechi

29 February 2020 26	Chievo	0–1	Livorno	Verona
CET (UTC+1)				Stadium: Marcantonio Bentegodi

3 March 2020 27	Livorno	2–2	Frosinone	Livorno
CET (UTC+1)				Stadium: Stadio Benito Stirpe

7 March 2020 28	Pisa	1–0	Livorno	Pisa
CET (UTC+1)				Stadium: Arena Garibaldi – Stadio Romeo Anconetani

20 June 2020 29	Livorno	0–2	Cittadella	Livorno
CEST (UTC+2)				Stadium: Stadio Benito Stirpe

26 June 2020 30	Juve Stabia	2–3	Livorno	Castellammare di Stabia
CEST (UTC+2)				Stadium: Stadio Romeo Menti

29 June 2020 31	Livorno	0–2	Venezia	Livorno
CEST (UTC+2)				Stadium: Stadio Benito Stirpe

3 July 2020 32	Trapani	2–1	Livorno	Trapani
CEST (UTC+2)				Stadium: Stadio Polisportivo Provinciale

10 July 2020 33	Livorno	1–2	Cremonese	Livorno
CEST (UTC+2)				Stadium: Stadio Benito Stirpe

13 July 2020 34	Livorno	0–1	Spezia	Livorno
CEST (UTC+2)				Stadium: Stadio Benito Stirpe

17 July 2020 35	Benevento	3–1	Livorno	Benevento
--:-- CEST (UTC+2)				Stadium: Stadio Ciro Vigorito

24 July 2020 36	Livorno	1–5	Crotone	Livorno
--:-- CEST (UTC+2)				Stadium: Stadio Benito Stirpe

27 July 2020 37	Pescara	1–0	Livorno	Pescara
--:-- CEST (UTC+2)				Stadium: Stadio Adriatico – Giovanni Cornacchia

31 July 2020 38	Livorno	0–2	Empoli	Livorno
--:-- CEST (UTC+2)				Stadium: Stadio Benito Stirpe

=== Coppa Italia ===
11 August 2019 Second round	Livorno	0–1	Carpi	Livorno
20:45 CEST (UTC+2)			Vano 69'	Stadium: Stadio Armando Picchi; Referee: Gianluca Manganiello
