= Alessandro Celli (footballer, born 1997) =

Italian footballer

Personal information
- Date of birth: 7 July 1997 (age 29)
- Place of birth: Latina, Italy
- Height: 1.94 m (6 ft 4 in)
- Position: Centre-back

Team information
- Current team: Montespaccato
- Number: 95

Youth career
- –2013: Genoa
- 2013–2016: Latina

Senior career*
Years	Team	Apps	(Gls)
2016–2017	Latina	0	(0)
2017–2018	Fidelis Andria	28	(0)
2018–2021	Pescara	0	(0)
2018–2019	→ Fano (loan)	27	(2)
2020	→ Rieti (loan)	7	(0)
2020–2021	→ Francavilla (loan)	16	(0)
2021–2023	Latina	38	(0)
2023–2024	Casarano	20	(2)
2024–2025	Savoia	30	(1)
2025	Pompei	11	(1)
2025–	Montespaccato	10	(0)
- * Club domestic league appearances and goals as of 1 March 2026

Alessandro Celli (born 7 July 1997) is an Italian professional footballer who plays as a centre-back for Italian Serie D club Montespaccato.

== Career ==
Born in Latina, Celli started his career in local club Latina Calcio. He was promoted to the first team on 2015–16 season.

He left Latina on 7 July 2017, and signed with Serie C club Fidelis Andria. Celli made his professional debut on 23 September against Catania.

On 24 May 2018, he signed with Pescara. On his first year, he was loaned to Fano in Serie C.

In January 2020, he was loaned to Rieti. On 22 January 2020, Celli played against Ternana of Alessandro Celli.

Forr the 2020–21 season, he was loaned to Virtus Francavilla.

On 13 August 2021, he returned to Latina in Serie C.
