= Incerti =

Incerti is an Italian surname. Notable people with the surname include:

- Anna Incerti (born 1980), Italian long-distance runner
- Davide Incerti (born 2002), Cuban footballer
- Rita Incerti (born 1961), Australian judge
- Stefano Incerti (born 1965), Italian film director
- Zac Incerti (born 1996), Australian swimmer
