= Mammarella =

Mammarella is an Italian surname. Notable people with the name include:

- Carlo Mammarella (born 1982), Italian footballer
- Italia Coppola (1912–2004), the matriarch of the Coppola family, who was nicknamed "Mammarella"
- Stefano Mammarella (born 1984), Italian futsal player
- Tony Mammarella (1924–1977), American television producer and host
