= Bresciano =

Bresciano may refer to:

- Bresciano, a demonym for inhabitants of Brescia, Lombardy, Italy
- Mark Bresciano (born 1980), Australian football player
- Adolfo Bresciano (1948–1993) or Dino Bravo, Canadian wrestler

== See also ==
- Bresciani, a surname
- Brescianino (disambiguation)
