= Bresciani =

Bresciani is an Italian surname meaning "Brescian", "of Brescia" or "from Brescia". Notable people with the surname include:

- Acaste Bresciani (1882–1969), Italian Roman Catholic priest and writer
- Andrea Bresciani (1923–2006), comics artist and illustrator
- Antonio Bresciani (artist) (1720–1817), Italian painter and engraver
- Antonio Bresciani (writer) (1798–1862), Italian Jesuit priest, novelist and journalist
- Ardito Bresciani (1899–1948), Italian cyclist
- Costantino Bresciani Turroni (1882–1963), Italian economist and statistician
- Dean L. Bresciani, American university president
- Dick Bresciani (1938–2014), American baseball executive
- Edda Bresciani (1930–2020), Italian egyptologist
- Giorgio Bresciani (born 1969), Italian footballer
- Jeanne Bresciani, American dancer and dance scholar
- Maria Carla Bresciani] (born 1973), former Italian female pole vaulter
- Michael Bresciani (born 1994), Italian cyclist
- Nicolas Bresciani (born 1997), Italian professional footballer
