= Luka Bogdan =

Croatian football defender

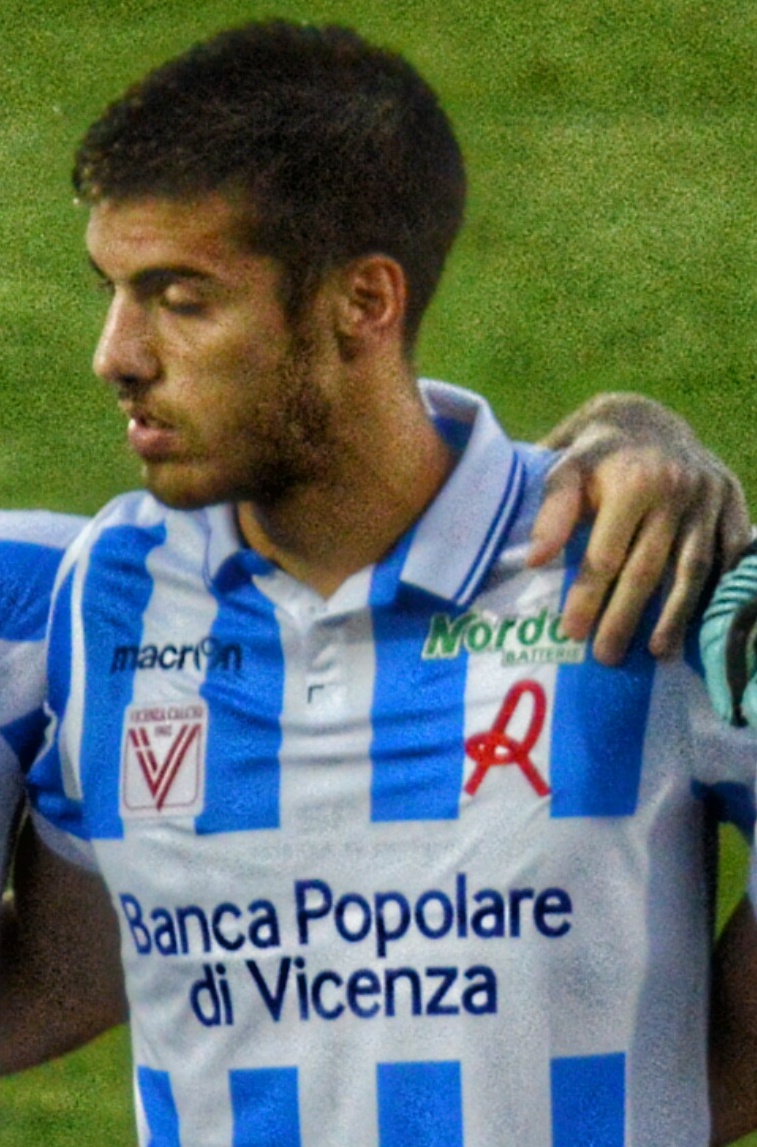
- Bogdan in 2016

Personal information
- Date of birth: 26 March 1996 (age 30)
- Place of birth: Split, Croatia
- Height: 1.95 m (6 ft 5 in)
- Position: Defender

Youth career
- –2013: Adriatic Split
- 2013–2014: Red Bull Salzburg

Senior career*
Years	Team	Apps	(Gls)
2014–2015	HB Køge	15	(0)
2015	Zavrč	10	(0)
2015–2016	Krka	25	(0)
2016–2017	Vicenza	9	(0)
2017–2018	Catania	34	(2)
2018–2021	Livorno	50	(2)
2020–2021	→ Salernitana (loan)	20	(4)
2021–2023	Salernitana	6	(0)
2022–2023	→ Ternana (loan)	27	(1)
2023–2024	Ternana	1	(0)
2023–2024	→ Ascoli (loan)	0	(0)
2024–2025	Istra 1961	8	(0)
2025–2026	AEL Limassol	19	(0)

International career^{‡}
2015	Croatia U19	2	(0)
2019-2020	Croatia U21	0	(0)
- * Club domestic league appearances and goals as of 17 April 2026 ‡ National team caps and goals as of 20:15, 4 April 2020 (ETC)

Luka Bogdan (born 26 March 1996) is a Croatian professional footballer who plays as a defender.

== Club career ==
In July 2018, Bogdan joined Livorno.

On 31 January 2022, Bogdan moved on loan to Ternana, with an option to buy. On 23 July 2022, the loan was renewed for the 2022–23 season, with an obligation to buy.

On 29 August 2023, Bogdan joined Ascoli on loan with an obligation to buy.

== Career statistics ==
=== Club ===
As of match played 23 August 2023

Appearances and goals by club, season and competition
Club	Season	League			National Cup (Note: Includes Danish Cup, Coppa Italia, Coppa Italia Serie C)		Europe		Other		Total	
Club	Season	Division	Apps	Goals	Apps	Goals	Apps	Goals	Apps	Goals	Apps	Goals
Køge	2014–15	1. Division	14	0	1	0	—		—		15	0
Zavrč	2014–15	Prva Liga	9	0	0	0	—		—		9	0
Zavrč	2015–16	Prva Liga	1	0	0	0	—		—		1	0
Zavrč	Total		10	0	0	0	—		—		10	0
Krka	2015–16	Prva Liga	25	0	0	0	—		—		25	0
Vicenza	2016–17	Serie B	9	0	2	0	—		—		11	0
Catania	2017–18	Serie C	30	2	1	0	—		4 (Note: Appearance(s) in Serie C play-off)	0	35	2
Livorno	2018–19	Serie B	20	1	0	0	—		—		20	1
Livorno	2019–20	Serie B	30	1	1	0	—		—		31	1
Livorno	Total		50	2	1	0	—		—		51	2
Salernitana	2020–21	Serie B	20	4	1	0	—		—		21	4
Salernitana	2021–22	Serie A	6	0	2	0	—		—		8	0
Salernitana	Total		26	4	3	0	—		—		29	4
Ternana	2021–22	Serie B	14	1	0	0	—		—		14	1
Ternana	2022–23	Serie B	13	0	1	0	—		—		14	0
Ternana	2023–24	Serie B	1	0	1	0	—		—		2	0
Ternana	Total		28	1	2	0	—		—		30	1
Career total			192	9	10	0	—		4	0	206	9
