= Simone Mazzocchi =

Italian footballer (born 1998)

Personal information
- Date of birth: 17 August 1998 (age 28)
- Place of birth: Milan, Italy
- Height: 1.80 m (5 ft 11 in)
- Position: Forward

Team information
- Current team: Spezia

Youth career
- Atalanta

Senior career*
Years	Team	Apps	(Gls)
2017–2019	Atalanta	0	(0)
2017–2018	→ Siracusa (loan)	24	(0)
2018–2019	→ Südtirol (loan)	33	(4)
2019–2021	Südtirol	24	(10)
2020–2021	→ Reggiana (loan)	29	(7)
2021–2025	Atalanta	0	(0)
2021–2022	→ Ternana (loan)	23	(4)
2022–2023	→ Südtirol (loan)	35	(3)
2023–2025	→ Cosenza (loan)	67	(8)
2025–2026	Cosenza	20	(7)
2026–	Spezia	0	(0)

International career^{‡}
2014–2015	Italy U17	18	(2)
2015–2016	Italy U18	8	(2)
2016	Italy U19	3	(0)
2017	Italy U20	3	(0)
- * Club domestic league appearances and goals as of 1 May 2026 ‡ National team caps and goals as of 9 January 2017

Simone Mazzocchi (born 17 August 1998) is an Italian professional footballer who plays as a forward for Serie C Group B club Spezia.

== Club career ==
=== Atalanta ===
Born in Milan, raised in a small neighborhood club (G. S. Villa), Mazzocchi was a youth exponent of Atalanta where he played 54 matches and scored 16 goal for their U-19 team.

==== Loan to Siracusa ====
On 24 July 2017, Mazzocchi was signed by Serie C side Siracusa on a season-long loan deal. One weeks later, on 30 July, he made his professional debut in a 3–1 home win over Renate in the first round of Coppa Italia, he played the entire match. One month kater, on 26 August, Mazzocchi made his Serie C debut as a starter in a 1–0 away defeat against Trapani, he was replaced by Paolo Grillo in the 79th minute. Mazzocchi ended his season-long loan to Siracusa with 25 appearances, including 11 of them as a starter, and 1 assist, but he never played any entire match in the championship.

==== Loan to Südtirol ====
On 17 July 2018, Mazzocchi was loaned to Serie C club Südtirol on a season-long loan deal. On 29 July he made his debut for Südtirol in a 2–1 home win over Albalonga in the first round of Coppa Italia, he was replaced by Gianluca Turchetta in the 58th minute. On 17 September he made his Serie C debut for Südtirol as a substitute replacing Gianluca Turchetta in the 56th minute of a 1–0 home win over Teramo. On 30 September he played his first match as a starter and he scored his first professional goal in the 42nd minute of a 3–2 away defeat against Virtus Verona. On 2 February 2019, Mazzocchi scored twice in a 4–2 away win over AlbinoLeffe. Mazzocchi ended his loan with 37 appearances and 4 goals.

=== Südtirol ===
On 1 July 2019, after the loan, Mazzocchi joined to Serie C club Südtirol on an undisclosed fee and a 3-year contract, however Atalanta had a buy-back clause after the second season. On 4 August he made his seasonal debut as a substitute replacing Niccolò Romero in the 84th minute and he scored his first goal of the season five minutes later in a 4–2 home win over Città di Fasano in the first round of Coppa Italia, and two weeks later, on 18 August, he played his first entire match for the club, a 3–1 away defeat against Udinese in the third round. One week later, Mazzocchi made his league debut and he scored his first goal in the championship in the 33rd minute of a 2–1 away win over Vis Pesaro, he was replaced by Niccolò Romero in the 84th minute.

==== Loan to Reggiana ====
On 11 September 2020, Mazzocchi joined newly promoted Serie B club Reggiana on a season-long loan. Two weeks later, on 27 September, Mazzzocchi made his debut for the club as a starter and he scored his first goal for Reggiana in the 7th minute of a 2–2 home draw against Pisa, he was replaced by Nicolò Cambiaghi after 78 minutes. One week later, on 3 October, he scored his second consecutive goal in the 43rd minute of a 2–0 away win over Virtus Entella. He became a regular starter early in the season. Two more weeks later, on 17 October, he played his first entire match for Reggiana, a 1–0 home defeat against ChievoVerona. Mazzocchi ended his season-long loan to Reggiana with 29 appearances, 7 goals and 1 assist.

=== Atalanta ===
On 14 July 2021, Atalanta exercised their buy-back option.

==== Loan to Ternana ====
On the same day, the club loaned him to newly promoted Serie B club Ternana for the 2020–21 season on a season-long loan deal.

==== Loan return to Südtirol ====
On 7 July 2022, Mazzocchi returned on a new loan to Südtirol.

=== Cosenza ===
On 22 July 2023, Mazzochi was loaned to Cosenza, with an option to buy.

On 26 July 2024, Mazzochi returned to Cosenza on a new loan, this time with an obligation to buy.

== International career ==
Mazzocchi represented Italy at U-17, U-18, U-19 and U-20 level. On 27 August 2014, Mazzocchi made his U-17 debut in a 0–0 home draw against Portugal U-17, he played the entire match. On 31 August 2014 he scored his first goal at U-17 level as a substitute in the 78th minute of a 4–3 away defeat against England U-17. Mazzocchi played 5 matches in the 2015 UEFA European Under-17 Championship qualification and he played 7 matches and scored 1 goal in the 2015 UEFA European Under-17 Championship. On 12 August 2015, Mazzocchi made his U-18 debut as a substitute replacing Marco Tumminello in the 57th minute of a 0–0 home draw against Bulgaria U-18. On 16 September he scored twice in a 3–2 away defeat against Czech Republic U-18. On 14 December 2016 he made his U-19 debut as a substitute replacing Andrea Pinamonti in the 56th minute of a 0–0 home draw against Serbia U-19. On 5 September 2017, Mazzocchi made his U-20 debut as a substitute replacing Federico Bonazzoli in the 69th minute of a 6–1 win over Poland U-20.

== Career statistics ==
As of match played on 7 October 2023

Club statistics
Club	Season	League			National Cup		Other		Total	
Club	Season	Division	Apps	Goals	Apps	Goals	Apps	Goals	Apps	Goals
Siracusa (loan)	2017–18	Serie C	24	0	1	0	1 (Note: Appearance in the Coppa Italia Serie C)	0	26	0
Südtirol (loan)	2018–19	Serie C	33	4	4	0	1	0	38	4
Südtirol	2019–20	Serie C	24	10	3	1	1 (Note: Appearance in the 2019–20 Serie C Promotion play-offs)	0	28	11
Reggina (loan)	2020–21	Serie B	29	7	0	0	—		29	7
Ternana (loan)	2021–22	Serie B	23	4	2	0	—		25	4
Südtirol (loan)	2022–23	Serie B	33	3	1	0	2 (Note: Appearances in the 2022–23 Serie B Promotion play-offs)	0	36	3
Cosenza (loan)	2023–24	Serie B	8	3	1	1	—		9	4
Career totals			174	31	11	1	5	0	190	32
