= Alessio Canessa =

Italian football player (born 1999)

Personal information
- Date of birth: 12 September 1999 (age 27)
- Place of birth: Livorno, Italy
- Height: 1.88 m (6 ft 2 in)
- Position: Forward

Team information
- Current team: Ghiviborgo
- Number: 9

Youth career
- Livorno

Senior career*
Years	Team	Apps	(Gls)
2017–2021	Livorno	22	(1)
2017–2018	→ Ponsacco (loan)	32	(7)
2019–2020	→ Pergolettese (loan)	18	(0)
2021–2022	Pro Livorno Sorgenti	29	(6)
2022–2023	Cuoiopelli	?	(3)
2022–2023	River Pieve	?	(15)
2023–2024	Sangiovannese	13	(2)
2024–	Ghiviborgo	1	(0)
- * Club domestic league appearances and goals as of 17 November 2024

Alessio Canessa (born 12 September 1999) is an Italian football player who plays for Serie D club Ghiviborgo.

== Club career ==
He is a product of Livorno youth teams and spent the 2017–18 season on loan to Serie D club Ponsacco.

He made his Serie B debut for Livorno on 9 December 2018 in a game against Foggia, as a starter.
