= Matteo Pallecchi =

Italian footballer (born 2000)

Personal information
- Date of birth: 9 February 2000 (age 26)
- Place of birth: Cecina, Italy
- Height: 1.85 m (6 ft 1 in)
- Position: Forward

Team information
- Current team: Arzachena
- Number: 11

Youth career
- Livorno

Senior career*
Years	Team	Apps	(Gls)
2019–2021	Livorno	32	(1)
2021–	Arzachena	8	(1)
- * Club domestic league appearances and goals as of 7 November 2021

Matteo Pallecchi (born 9 February 2000) is an Italian football player. He plays for Arzachena.

== Club career ==
He made his Serie B debut for Livorno on 23 November 2019 in a game against Trapani. He substituted Filip Raičević in the 79th minute. Pallecchi currently plays as a midfielder.

On 26 August 2021, he signed with Arzachena in Serie D.
