= Andrew Marie-Sainte =

French footballer (born 1998)

Personal information
- Full name: Andrew Delly Marie-Sainte
- Date of birth: 20 August 1998 (age 28)
- Place of birth: Fort-de-France, Martinique
- Height: 1.85 m (6 ft 1 in)
- Position: Defender

Senior career*
Years	Team	Apps	(Gls)
2016–2018	Prato	1	(0)
2017–2018	→ Napoli (loan)	0	(0)
2017–2021	Livorno	21	(1)
2024	Pistoiese		
2024	Ceahlăul Piatra Neamț	1	(0)
2024–2025	Olbia	14	(1)
2025	Nuova Sondrio	8	(0)
- * Club domestic league appearances and goals as of 30 November 2025

Andrew Delly Marie-Sainte (born 20 August 1998) is a French professional footballer who plays as a defender.

== Career ==
Born in Fort-de-France, Martinique, Marie-Sainte has played for Prato, Napoli and Livorno.
