= Aniello Salzano =

Italian footballer (born 1991)

Personal information
- Date of birth: 20 July 1991 (age 35)
- Place of birth: Naples, Italy
- Height: 1.81 m (5 ft 11 in)
- Position: Midfielder

Team information
- Current team: Gelbison
- Number: 88

Senior career*
Years	Team	Apps	(Gls)
2008–2011	Union Quinto	47	(6)
2010–2011	→ Venezia (loan)	16	(1)
2011–2013	Portogruaro	33	(2)
2013–2014	Tuttocuoio	36	(9)
2014–2017	Crotone	57	(2)
2017–2018	Bari	20	(2)
2018–2022	Ternana	80	(5)
2019	→ Livorno (loan)	8	(1)
2022–2024	Sangiuliano	47	(13)
2024–	Gelbison	10	(0)
- * Club domestic league appearances and goals as of 27 August 2022

Aniello Salzano (born 20 July 1991) is an Italian footballer who plays for Serie D club Gelbison.

== Club career ==
On 31 January 2019, he joined Livorno on loan.
