= Davide Incerti =

Cuban footballer

Personal information
- Full name: Davide Fabrizio Incerti
- Date of birth: 22 June 2002 (age 24)
- Place of birth: Havana, Cuba
- Height: 1.85 m (6 ft 1 in)
- Position: Midfielder

Team information
- Current team: Taranto
- Number: 25

Youth career
- 2019–2020: Genoa
- 2020–2021: Ternana

Senior career*
Years	Team	Apps	(Gls)
2018	Athletic Club Liberi		
2021–2022	Ternana	0	(0)
2021–2022	→ Atletico Uri (loan)	31	(0)
2022–2024	Olbia	36	(0)
2024	Matera	11	(0)
2024–2025	Brindisi	19	(1)
2025	Ferrandina	13	(1)
2025–	Taranto		

International career^{‡}
2021–	Cuba	7	(0)
- * Club domestic league appearances and goals as of 7 December 2025 ‡ National team caps and goals as of 19:41, 22 June 2023 (UTC)

Davide Fabrizio Incerti (born 22 June 2002) is a Cuban footballer who plays as a midfielder for Italian Eccellenza club Taranto.

== Club career ==
Incerti started his career with Italian sixth division side Athletic Club Liberi. After that, he joined the youth academy of Genoa in the Italian Serie A. After that, Incerti joined the youth academy of Italian third division side Ternana.

For the 2021–22 season, he was loaned to Atletico Uri in the fourth-tier Serie D.

On 7 July 2022, Incerti signed with Olbia for one season.

== International career ==
Incerti was born in Cuba to an Italian father and Cuban mother. He made his debut with the Cuba national team in a 5-0 2022 FIFA World Cup qualification win over British Virgin Islands on 2 June 2021.
