= Carlo Mammarella =

Italian footballer (born 1982)

Personal information
- Date of birth: 29 June 1982 (age 44)
- Place of birth: Pescara, Italy
- Height: 1.82 m (6 ft 0 in)
- Position: Left back

Senior career*
Years	Team	Apps	(Gls)
2001–2002	Pescara	1	(0)
2002–2006	Fermana	6	(0)
2003–2005	→ Tolentino (loan)	56	(8)
2005–2006	→ Triestina (loan)	12	(1)
2006–2007	Grosseto	7	(0)
2007	→ Ancona (loan)	13	(0)
2007–2008	Salernitana	13	(0)
2008–2016	Lanciano	163	(13)
2016–2019	Pro Vercelli	127	(4)
2019–2021	Ternana	46	(4)
- * Club domestic league appearances and goals as of 2 May 2021

Carlo Mammarella (born 29 June 1982) is an Italian footballer who played as a left back.

== Career ==
Mammarella started his professional career at Pescara, and also played for Fermana and Tolentino before making his professional debuts for Triestina in the 2005–06 Serie B season. He then returned to Serie C1, playing for Grosseto, Ancona and Salernitana.

In August 2008, Mammarella signed a contract with Lanciano. He achieved promotion at the end of the 2011–12 season, and extended his contract until 2014.

On 1 July 2019, Ternana announced the signing of Mammarella on a 2-year contract.
