= Christian Capone =

Italian footballer (born 1999)

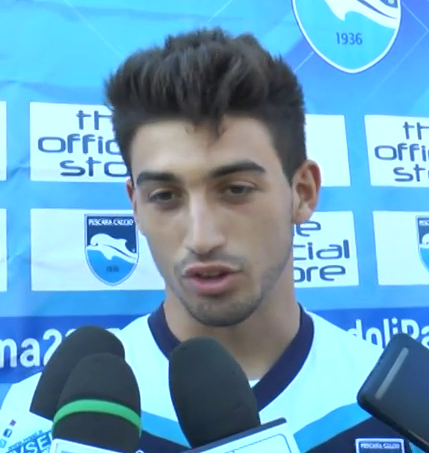

Personal information
- Full name: Christian Capone
- Date of birth: 28 April 1999 (age 27)
- Place of birth: Vigevano, Italy
- Height: 1.83 m (6 ft 0 in)
- Position: Winger

Team information
- Current team: Trento
- Number: 10

Youth career
- Atalanta

Senior career*
Years	Team	Apps	(Gls)
2016–2025	Atalanta	0	(0)
2017–2018	→ Pescara (loan)	24	(6)
2018–2019	→ Pescara (loan)	12	(0)
2019–2020	→ Perugia (loan)	20	(2)
2020–2021	→ Pescara (loan)	20	(1)
2021–2022	→ Ternana (loan)	17	(1)
2022–2023	→ Südtirol (loan)	4	(0)
2023	→ Reggiana (loan)	9	(0)
2023–2024	→ Atalanta U23	34	(4)
2024–2025	→ Vicenza (loan)	27	(2)
2025–	Trento	36	(11)

International career^{‡}
2014	Italy U15	7	(1)
2014–2015	Italy U16	15	(1)
2015–2016	Italy U17	7	(0)
2016–2017	Italy U18	8	(1)
2017–2018	Italy U19	15	(3)
2018–2019	Italy U20	11	(1)
2018	Italy U21	2	(1)
- * Club domestic league appearances and goals as of 29 April 2026 ‡ National team caps and goals as of 9 September 2019

Christian Capone (born 28 April 1999) is an Italian professional footballer who plays as a forward for Serie C Group A club Trento.

== Club career ==
=== Atalanta ===
Born in Vigevano, Capone began his career at Serie A side Atalanta. He made his first team debut on 30 November 2016, starting in a 3–0 Coppa Italia home win against Pescara.

==== Loan to Pescara ====
On 1 July 2017, Capone was signed by Serie B side Pescara with a season-long loan deal. On 6 August, Capone made his debut for Pescara in the second round of Coppa Italia as a starter in a 5–3 home win, after extra-time, against Triestina, he played the entire match. One week later he scored his first professional goal in the third round in the 30th minute of a 3–1 away win over Brescia. On 27 August, Capone made his debut in Serie B for Pescara in a 5–1 home win over Foggia, he was replaced by Ahmad Benali in the 46th minute. On 16 September, Capone scored his first goal in Serie B in the 25th minute of a 2–2 away draw against Salernitana. Three days later, he played his first entire match in Serie B and he scored his second goal in the 17th minute of a 2–2 home draw against Virtus Entella. Capone ended his loan to Pescara with 26 appearances, 7 goals and 3 assists.

On 17 August 2018, Capone return on loan to Pescara until the end of 2018–19 Serie B season. On 25 August he started his second season at Pescara as a substitute replacing Pepìn in the 85th minute of a 1–1 away draw against Cremonese. On 22 September he played his first match as a starter of the season, a 1–0 home win over Foggia, he was replaced by Mirko Antonucci in the 57th minute. Capone ended his loan to Pescara with 12 appearances, including only 2 of them as a starter and 1 assist, but he did not play any entire match during his second loan.

==== Loan to Perugia ====
On 13 July 2019, Capone was loaned to Serie B club Perugia until the end of the season. On 11 August he made his debut for Perugia in a 1–0 home win over Triestina in the second round of Coppa Italia, he played the entire match. On 25 August he made his league debut as a substitute replacing Federico Melchiorri in the 64th minute of a 2–1 home win over ChievoVerona. Six days later he played his first match as a starter in Serie B for the club, a 1–0 away win over Livorno, he was replaced by Federico Melchiorri in the 54th minute. On 1 December he scored his first goal for Perugia in the 34th minute of a 3–1 home win over Pescara. Three weeks later, on 21 December, he scored his second goal in the 61 st minute of a 2–1 home win over Virtus Entella. Capone ended his loan to Perugia with 24 appearances and 2 goals.

==== Loan to Pescara ====
On 24 September 2020, Capone returned to Serie B side Pescara on a season-long loan deal. Two days later, on 26 September, he made his seasonal debut for the club as a substitute replacing Cristian Galano for the last 6 minutes of a 0–0 home draw against ChievoVerona. On 20 October he played his first entire match, a 4–0 away defeat against Venezia. Seven months later, on 4 May 2021, Capone scored his first goal of the season and the winning goal of the match in the 8th minute of a 1–0 home win over Reggiana. Capone ended his second loan to Pescara with 22 appearances, on 10 as a starter and 1 goal, however Pescara was relegated in Serie C.

==== Loan to Ternana ====
On 27 July 2021, he joined newly-promoted Serie B club Ternana on loan with an option to buy.

==== Loan to Südtirol ====
On 3 August 2022, Capone joined Südtirol in Serie B on loan.

==== Loan to Reggiana ====
On 5 January 2023, Capone moved on a new loan to Reggiana in Serie C.

==== Loan to Vicenza ====
On 30 August 2024, Capone was loaned to Vicenza, with an option to buy.

=== Trento ===
On 31 July 2025, Capone moved to Trento in Serie C on a permanent basis and signed a two-season contract.

== International career ==
Capone has been capped by Italy at U15, U16, U17, U18 levels, and also reached the final of the 2018 UEFA European Under-19 Championship with the U19 side.

On 25 May 2018 he made his debut with the Italy U21 team in a 3–2 friendly loss against Portugal, and on 29 May, he scored his first goal with the U21 side in a friendly match against France.

== Career statistics ==
=== Club ===
As of 18 July 2021

Club	Season	League			Cup		Europe		Other		Total	
Club	Season	League	Apps	Goals	Apps	Goals	Apps	Goals	Apps	Goals	Apps	Goals
Atalanta	2016–17	Serie A	0	0	1	0	—		—		1	0
Pescara (loan)	2017–18	Serie B	24	6	2	1	—		—		26	7
Pescara (loan)	2018–19	Serie B	12	0	0	0	—		—		12	0
Perugia (loan)	2019–20	Serie B	20	2	3	0	—		1 (Note: All appearance(s) in Serie B play-out.)	0	24	2
Pescara (loan)	2020–21	Serie B	20	1	2	0	—		—		22	1
Career total			58	8	8	1	—		1	0	67	9

== Honours ==
Italy U19

- UEFA European Under-19 Championship runner-up: 2018
