= Antonio Palumbo =

Italian footballer (born 1996)

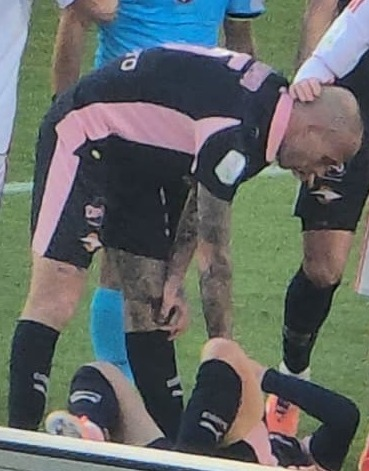
- Palumbo in 2026 with Palermo

Personal information
- Date of birth: 6 August 1996 (age 30)
- Place of birth: Naples, Italy
- Height: 1.82 m (6 ft 0 in)
- Position: Midfielder

Team information
- Current team: Palermo
- Number: 5

Youth career
- Amici di Mugnano
- 2011–2015: Ternana

Senior career*
Years	Team	Apps	(Gls)
2014–2016	Ternana	27	(3)
2016–2021	Sampdoria	1	(0)
2016–2017	→ Ternana (loan)	18	(1)
2017–2018	→ Trapani (loan)	33	(1)
2018–2019	→ Salernitana (loan)	5	(0)
2019–2020	→ Ternana (loan)	38	(2)
2020–2021	→ Ternana (loan)	25	(1)
2021–2023	Ternana	68	(7)
2023–2025	Modena	71	(16)
2025–	Palermo	35	(3)
- * Club domestic league appearances and goals as of 12 May 2026

Antonio Palumbo (born 6 August 1996) is an Italian professional footballer who plays as a midfielder for Serie B club Palermo.

== Club career ==
Palumbo started his career at Amici di Mugnano youth academy. Palumbo and teammate Simone Russini were signed by Umbrian side Ternana in 2011. Palumbo made his professional debut in the first match of Ternana in the second round of 2014–15 Coppa Italia. He also played 12 times in 2014–15 Serie B season.

On 6 July 2018, he joined Serie B club Salernitana on a season-long loan. Salernitana held an option to buy him out at the end of the season, which would turn into an obligation to buy if Salernitana got promoted into Serie A.

After making only five appearances for Salernitana in the first half of the season, he was recalled from loan. On 25 January 2019, he rejoined Ternana on another loan until the end of 2018–19 season. On 3 August 2019, he returned on loan at Ternana until 30 June 2020 with an option to buy. Upon his return from this loan, he made his Serie A debut for Sampdoria on 2 October 2020 in a game against Fiorentina, he substituted Albin Ekdal in the 84th minute of a 2–1 away victory. On 5 October 2020, he returned to Ternana for his third loan. On 15 June 2021, Ternana exercised their option to purchase his rights and he signed a four-year contract with the club.

On 18 July 2023, Palumbo moved to Modena.

On 23 July 2025, Serie B club Palermo announced the signing of Palumbo from Modena.

== International career ==
Palumbo received his first Italy U-20 team call-up in November 2015, replacing midfielders Lorenzo Pellegrini and Luca Mazzitelli who injured, Alberto Grassi who left for the U21 team. Palumbo was an unused bench against Germany on 12 November.

On 13 November, Mazzitelli was returned from injury, but Alberigo Evani, the coach, still kept Palumbo in the squad, as well as adding Leonardo Capezzi to the call-up. On 17 November, Palumbo was featured as a bench warmer again.

== Career statistics ==
As of match played on 1 May 2024

Appearances and goals by club, season and competition
Club	Season	League			National cup		Continental		Other		Total	
Club	Season	Division	Apps	Goals	Apps	Goals	Apps	Goals	Apps	Goals	Apps	Goals
Ternana	2014–15	Serie B	12	0	1	0	—		—		13	0
Ternana	2015–16	Serie B	15	3	1	0	—		—		16	3
Ternana	Total		27	3	2	0	0	0	0	0	29	3
Ternana (loan)	2016–17	Serie B	18	1	2	0	—		—		20	1
Trapani (loan)	2017–18	Serie C	33	1	0	0	—		—		33	1
Sampdoria	2018–19	Serie A	0	0	2	0	—		—		2	0
Sampdoria	2020–21	Serie A	1	0	0	0	—		—		1	0
Sampdoria	Total		1	0	2	0	0	0	0	0	3	0
Salernitana (loan)	2018–19	Serie B	5	0	0	0	—		—		5	0
Ternana (loan)	2018–19	Serie C	10	1	0	0	—		—		10	1
Ternana (loan)	2019–20	Serie C	31	1	0	0	—		—		31	1
Ternana	2020–21	Serie C	25	1	0	0	—		—		25	1
Ternana	2021–22	Serie B	33	3	1	0	—		—		34	3
Ternana	2022–23	Serie B	35	4	1	1	—		—		36	5
Ternana	Total		93	8	2	1	0	0	0	0	95	9
Modena	2023–24	Serie B	34	7	1	0	—		—		35	7
Career totals			252	22	9	1	0	0	0	0	261	23
