= Nicolas Bresciani =

Italian professional footballer

Personal information
- Date of birth: 12 May 1997 (age 29)
- Place of birth: Pontremoli, Italy
- Height: 1.78 m (5 ft 10 in)
- Position: Defender

Team information
- Current team: Seravezza Pozzi

Senior career*
Years	Team	Apps	(Gls)
2016–2018	Seravezza Pozzi		
2018–2021	Livorno	12	(0)
2018–2019	→ Ravenna (loan)	29	(2)
2019–2020	→ Reggina (loan)	11	(1)
2021	Carrarese	9	(0)
2021–	Seravezza Pozzi	6	(0)
- * Club domestic league appearances and goals as of 14 November 2021

Nicolas Bresciani (born 12 May 1997) is an Italian professional footballer who plays for Seravezza Pozzi, as a defender.

== Career ==
Born in Pontremoli, Bresciani has played for Seravezza Pozzi, Livorno and Ravenna.

On 12 July 2019, he joined Reggina on loan.

In January 2021 he signed for Carrarese.

On 27 September 2021 he returned to Seravezza Pozzi in Serie D.
