= Federico Mazzarani =

Italian footballer

Personal information
- Date of birth: 1 July 2000 (age 26)
- Place of birth: Rome, Italy
- Height: 1.84 m (6 ft 0 in)
- Position: Centre back

Team information
- Current team: Atletico Ascoli

Youth career
- Ternana

Senior career*
Years	Team	Apps	(Gls)
2019–2023	Ternana	6	(0)
2019–2021	→ Pistoiese (loan)	33	(1)
2021–2022	→ Pro Sesto (loan)	34	(0)
2023–	Atletico Ascoli	11	(0)
- * Club domestic league appearances and goals as of 20 December 2023

Federico Mazzarani (born 1 July 2000) is an Italian professional footballer who plays as a centre back for Serie D club Atletico Ascoli.

== Club career ==
Born in Rome, Mazzarani started his career in Ternana youth system. He made his first team debut on 29 July 2018 against Pontedera for Coppa Italia.

On 10 July 2019, he was loaned to Pistoiese.

On 22 July 2021, he joined Serie C club Pro Sesto on loan.
