= Luca Ghiringhelli =

Italian footballer

Personal information
- Date of birth: 23 January 1992 (age 34)
- Place of birth: Pavia, Italy
- Height: 1.80 m (5 ft 11 in)
- Position: Defender

Team information
- Current team: Pavia
- Number: 6

Youth career
- Don Orione
- 2002–2011: Milan

Senior career*
Years	Team	Apps	(Gls)
2011–2012	SPAL	28	(0)
2012–2013	Novara	17	(1)
2013–2014	Juve Stabia	29	(0)
2014–2016	Pavia	56	(1)
2016–2018	Reggiana	57	(2)
2018–2021	Cittadella	72	(2)
2021–2023	Ternana	36	(1)
2023–2024	Südtirol	5	(0)
2024	→ SPAL (loan)	13	(1)
2024–2026	Novara	21	(0)
2026–	Pavia	0	(0)

International career^{‡}
2010–2011	Italy U-19	7	(0)
- * Club domestic league appearances and goals as of 17 January 2026 ‡ National team caps and goals as of 11 August 2013

Luca Ghiringhelli (born 23 January 1992) is an Italian professional footballer who plays for Serie D club Pavia as a defender.

== Club career ==
=== Early career ===
Born in Pavia, Ghiringhelli started playing football with local amateur team Don Orione, before joining Milan in 2002. He spent nine seasons in the club's youth system and he was a member of the under-20 side who won the Coppa Italia Primavera in 2010, 25 years after the team's last success in the competition.

=== SPAL ===
At the beginning of the 2011–12 season, Ghiringhelli moved to Prima Divisione club SPAL in a co-ownership deal. He made a total of 22 league appearances for the club. At the end of the season, the co-ownership was resolved in favour of Milan via a blind auction.

=== Novara ===
For the 2012–13 season, Ghiringhelli joined Serie B side Novara, once again in a co-ownership deal with Milan. He scored his first goal with Novara in the match against Empoli.

=== Juve Stabia ===
On 18 June 2013, Milan bought out the full ownership rights of Ghiringhelli. On 1 July 2013 Ghiringhelli joined Serie B club Juve Stabia in a definitive deal.

=== Pavia ===
In summer 2014 Ghiringhelli joined Lega Pro club Pavia on a free transfer.

=== Reggiana ===
On 11 July 2016, he signed for fellow Serie C team Reggiana on a free transfer.

=== Ternana ===
On 9 June 2021, he joined Ternana on a three-year contract.

=== Südtirol ===
On 10 July 2023, he moved to Südtirol on a two-year contract. On 31 January 2024, Ghiringhelli returned to SPAL on loan.

=== Return to Novara ===
On 16 July 2024, Ghiringhelli signed a two-season contract with Novara.

== International career ==
Ghiringhelli won a total of seven caps with Italy U-19 between 2010 and 2011.
