= Antony Iannarilli =

Italian footballer (born 1990)

Personal information
- Date of birth: 18 December 1990 (age 35)
- Place of birth: Alatri, Italy
- Height: 1.86 m (6 ft 1 in)
- Position: Goalkeeper

Team information
- Current team: Avellino
- Number: 1

Youth career
- –2011: Lazio

Senior career*
Years	Team	Apps	(Gls)
2010–2011	→ SSD Isola Liri (loan)	12	(0)
2011–2014	Salernitana	47	(0)
2014–2015	Gubbio	38	(1)
2015–2016	Pavia	0	(0)
2015–2016	→ Pistoiese (loan)	34	(0)
2016–2018	Viterbese	72	(0)
2018–2024	Ternana	195	(0)
2024–	Avellino	45	(1)
- * Club domestic league appearances and goals as of 10 May 2026

Antony Iannarilli (born 18 December 1990) is an Italian professional footballer who plays as a goalkeeper for Serie B club Avellino.

== Club career ==
On 15 May 2021, Iannarilli played his 100th match for Ternana, against Como for the Supercoppa di Serie C.

On 11 April 2026, Iannarilli scored a stoppage-time equaliser against Catanzaro.
