= Pietro Rovaglia =

Italian footballer

Personal information
- Date of birth: 26 February 2001 (age 25)
- Place of birth: Verona, Italy
- Height: 1.85 m (6 ft 1 in)
- Position: Forward

Youth career
- 2010–2019: Chievo

Senior career*
Years	Team	Apps	(Gls)
2019–2021	Chievo	3	(0)
2021	→ Pistoiese (loan)	14	(0)
2021–2025	Ternana	5	(0)
2021–2022	→ Fermana (loan)	5	(0)
2023	→ Montevarchi (loan)	13	(3)
2023–2024	→ Juve Stabia (loan)	13	(0)
2024	→ Casertana (loan)	10	(2)
2024–2025	→ Gubbio (loan)	18	(1)

International career^{‡}
2016	Italy U15	1	(0)
2019	Italy U18	1	(1)
2019	Italy U19	2	(1)
- * Club domestic league appearances and goals as of 31 August 2025 ‡ National team caps and goals as of 14 October 2019

Pietro Rovaglia (born 26 February 2001) is an Italian professional footballer who plays as a forward.

== Club career ==
On 22 March 2019, he signed his first professional contract with Chievo until 30 June 2023.

He made his Serie B debut for Chievo on 20 October 2019 in a game against Ascoli. He substituted Riccardo Meggiorini in the 82nd minute. He made his first appearance in the starting lineup on 10 November 2019 against Frosinone.

On 29 January 2021, he joined Serie C club Pistoiese on loan until the end of the 2020–21 season.

On 17 August 2021, he signed a 4-years contract with Ternana. On the same day, he went to Fermana on loan. On 25 January 2022, the loan was terminated early.

On 13 January 2023, he went to Montevarchi on loan.

On 25 August 2023, Rovaglia was loaned to Juve Stabia. On 1 February 2024, he moved on a new loan to Casertana. On 29 August 2024, Rovaglia was loaned to Gubbio.

== International career ==
He first represented his country for the Under-15 squad in 2016. In 2019, he was called up for friendlies of the Under-18 and Under-19 squads.
