= Anthony Partipilo =

Italian footballer (born 1994)

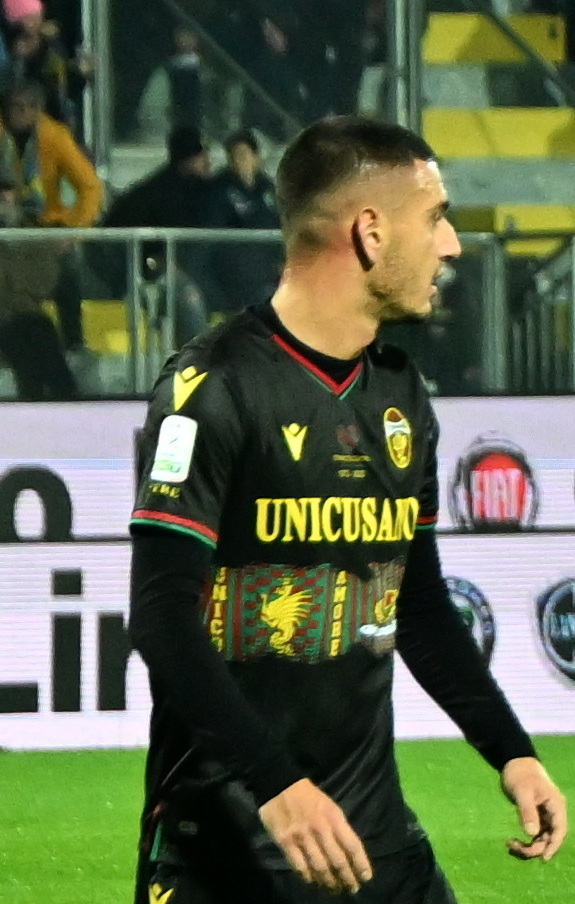
- Partipilo in 2022

Personal information
- Date of birth: 27 October 1994 (age 32)
- Place of birth: Bari, Italy
- Height: 1.81 m (5 ft 11 in)
- Position: Forward

Team information
- Current team: Bari (on loan from Parma)
- Number: 21

Youth career
- –2013: Bari

Senior career*
| Years | Team | Apps | (Gls) |
| 2012–2016 | Bari | 1 | (0) |
| 2013 | → Carrarese (loan) | 2 | (0) |
| 2014 | → Cosenza (loan) | 10 | (0) |
| 2015 | → Savoia (loan) | 15 | (1) |
| 2015–2016 | → CFR Cluj (loan) | 0 | (0) |
| 2016–2018 | Bisceglie | 60 | (10) |
| 2018–2019 | Virtus Francavilla | 49 | (16) |
| 2019–2023 | Ternana | 135 | (39) |
| 2023– | Parma | 27 | (3) |
| 2024–2025 | → Frosinone (loan) | 25 | (3) |
| 2025– | → Bari (loan) | 11 | (0) |
- * Club domestic league appearances and goals as of 2 March 2026

Anthony Partipilo (born 27 October 1994) is an Italian professional footballer who plays as a forward for Serie C Group C club Bari on loan from Parma.

== Club career ==
He made his Serie B debut for Bari on 15 December 2012 in a game against Novara.

On 13 August 2019, he signed a 4-year contract with Ternana.

On 30 August 2024, Patripilo joined Frosinone on loan with an option to buy.

On 8 August 2025, Patripilo returned to Bari on loan with a conditional obligation to buy.

== Honours ==
Parma

- Serie B: 2023–24
