= Stefano Pettinari =

Italian footballer (born 1992)

Personal information
- Date of birth: 27 January 1992 (age 34)
- Place of birth: Rome, Italy
- Height: 1.85 m (6 ft 1 in)
- Positions: Attacking midfielder; striker

Team information
- Current team: Ternana
- Number: 32

Youth career
- Roma

Senior career*
Years	Team	Apps	(Gls)
2009–2011	Roma	1	(0)
2010–2011	→ Siena (loan)	0	(0)
2011–2014	Crotone	89	(14)
2014–2016	Roma	0	(0)
2014–2015	→ Latina (loan)	22	(1)
2015	→ Pescara (loan)	12	(1)
2015–2016	→ Vicenza (loan)	11	(0)
2016	→ Como (loan)	14	(2)
2016–2018	Pescara	44	(13)
2017	→ Ternana (loan)	13	(2)
2018–2021	Lecce	36	(5)
2019	→ Crotone (loan)	11	(2)
2019–2020	→ Trapani (loan)	35	(17)
2021–2023	Ternana	45	(8)
2023	→ Benevento (loan)	11	(1)
2023–2025	Reggiana	31	(3)
2025–2026	Ternana	21	(7)

International career
2007–2008	Italy U16	10	(5)
2008	Italy U17	5	(0)
2010	Italy U19	4	(0)
2011–2012	Italy U20	7	(1)
2013	Italy U21	1	(0)
- * Club domestic league appearances and goals as of 30 April 2026

Stefano Pettinari (born 27 January 1992) is an Italian professional footballer who plays as an attacking midfielder or striker for Serie C Group B club Ternana.

== Club career ==
Pettinari was born in Rome, and made his debut for Roma first team on 16 December 2009, in an UEFA Europa League game against PFC CSKA Sofia. Then he made his Serie A debut on 20 March 2010, when he came on as a substitute for Jérémy Menez in the 87th minute of the game against Udinese.

He spent the first part of the 2010–11 season on loan to Serie B club Siena, but he didn't find any opportunity to play, so in January 2011 he came back to Roma, where he trained with the first team.

In July 2011 he was sent on loan to Serie B club Crotone for the 2011–12 season. On 17 September 2011, he scored his first league goal in the home match won 2–1 against Empoli. In June 2012, Crotone exercised the option to buy him in a co-ownership deal for €250,000. In June 2014 he returned to Roma for €500,000.

On 24 July 2015, he signed for Vicenza. He wore no.9 shirt for 2015–16 Serie B, but on 5 September given to Nicola Pozzi. Pettinari took no.20 shirt from Srđan Spiridonović instead. On 13 January 2016, he signed for Como on loan. He scored 2 goals in 14 appearances in the Serie B.

On 25 August 2016, he moved to Pescara, this time on a permanent basis. He made his second Serie A appearance on 19 November 2016 against Juventus at the Juventus Stadium. He played in six matches before being sent to Serie B club Ternana on loan in January 2017. He was a key figure in Ternana's team that managed to avoid relegation to Serie C.

Pettinari came back to Pescara at the start of the 2017–18 Serie B season and immediately gained a place in the starting lineup. He scored 13 goals in 38 appearances in Serie B and 1 goal in 2 appearances in the Coppa Italia.

On 28 June 2018, he signed for Serie B side Lecce on a permanent basis. On 28 January 2019, he returned to Crotone on loan.

On 17 June 2020, he joined Trapani on a permanent basis.

On 13 October 2020, soon after Trapani was excluded from all professional leagues, Pettinari returned to Lecce.

On 15 July 2021, he returned to Ternana on a three-year contract. In January 2023, he joined Benevento on loan with the right to make the move permanent.

On 11 August 2023, Pettinari moved to Reggiana.

== International career ==
He has already played for the U-16, U-17 and U-19 national teams.

== Career statistics ==
As of 26 May 2024

Appearances and goals by club, season and competition
Club	Season	League			Cup		Continental		Total	
Club	Season	Division	Apps	Goals	Apps	Goals	Apps	Goals	Apps	Goals
Roma	2009–10	Serie A	1	0	—		0	0	1	0
Roma	2010–11	Serie A	0	0	—		—		0	0
Roma	Total		1	0	—		0	0	1	0
Siena (loan)	2010–11	Serie B	0	0	1	0	—		1	0
Crotone	2011–12	Serie B	23	4	2	0	—		25	4
Crotone	2012–13	Serie B	33	1	2	0	—		35	1
Crotone	2013–14	Serie B	34	9	2	2	—		36	11
Crotone	Total		89	14	6	2	—		95	16
Roma	2014–15	Serie A	0	0	—		—		0	0
Roma	2015–16	Serie A	0	0	—		—		0	0
Roma	Total		0	0	—		—		0	0
Latina (loan)	2014–15	Serie B	22	1	2	1	—		24	2
Pescara (loan)	2014–15	Serie B	12	2	—		—		12	2
Vicenza (loan)	2015–16	Serie B	11	0	1	0	—		12	0
Como (loan)	2015–16	Serie B	14	2	0	0	—		14	2
Pescara	2016–17	Serie A	6	0	1	0	—		7	0
Pescara	2017–18	Serie B	38	13	2	1	—		40	14
Pescara	Total		44	13	3	1	—		47	14
Ternana (loan)	2016–17	Serie B	13	2	—		—		13	2
Lecce	2018–19	Serie B	12	0	2	0	—		14	0
Lecce	2020–21	Serie B	24	5	1	0	—		25	5
Lecce	Total		36	5	3	0	—		39	5
Crotone (loan)	2018–19	Serie B	11	2	—		—		11	2
Trapani (loan)	2019–20	Serie B	35	17	—		—		35	17
Ternana	2021–22	Serie B	31	6	3	1	—		34	7
Ternana	2022–23	Serie B	14	2	1	0	—		15	2
Ternana	Total		45	8	4	1	—		49	9
Benevento (loan)	2022–23	Serie B	11	1	—		—		11	1
Reggiana	2023–24	Serie B	19	2	1	0	—		20	2
Career Total			364	69	21	5	0	0	385	74
