= Federico Furlan =

Italian footballer

Personal information
- Date of birth: 25 November 1990 (age 35)
- Place of birth: Montebelluna, Italy
- Height: 1.81 m (5 ft 11 in)
- Position: Midfielder

Team information
- Current team: Cjarlins Muzane
- Number: 7

Youth career
- Montebelluna
- 2007–2009: Milan

Senior career*
Years	Team	Apps	(Gls)
2009–2010	Milan	0	(0)
2009–2010	→ San Marino (loan)	26	(2)
2010–2015	Varese	1	(0)
2011–2012	→ Monza (loan)	7	(0)
2012–2015	→ Bassano Virtus (loan)	92	(6)
2015–2016	Ternana	40	(6)
2016–2018	Bari	31	(1)
2017–2018	→ Brescia (loan)	34	(0)
2018–2019	Sampdoria	0	(0)
2018–2019	→ Ternana (loan)	27	(0)
2019–2023	Ternana	72	(10)
2022–2023	→ Triestina (loan)	18	(0)
2023	→ Latina (loan)	15	(0)
2023–2024	Varese	20	(2)
2024–	Cjarlins Muzane	12	(2)
- * Club domestic league appearances and goals as of 10 November 2024

Federico Furlan (born 25 November 1990) is an Italian professional footballer who plays as a midfielder for Serie D club Cjarlins Muzane.

== Club career ==
A product of A.C. Milan youth system, Furlan spent the 2009–10 season on loan at San Marino, before joining Varese in a co-ownership deal. In January 2011, he was sent out on loan to Monza for the remainder of the 2010–11 season. On 23 June 2011 Varese purchased 100% of the economic rights of the player from AC Milan.

On 9 August 2018, Furlan signed to Serie A side Sampdoria for free. He was immediately loaned out to Ternana for the 2018–19 season with an option to buy. At the end of the season, Ternana triggered the option.

On 13 July 2022, Furlan was loaned to Triestina for the season, with an obligation to buy in case of Triestina's promotion to Serie B. On 31 January 2023, he moved on a new loan to Latina.

On 1 September 2023, Furlan's contract with Ternana was terminated by mutual consent.

== Career statistics ==
As of match played on 12 May 2018

Appearances and goals by club, season and competition
Club	Season	League			Cup		League Cup		Other		Total	
Club	Season	Division	Apps	Goals	Apps	Goals	Apps	Goals	Apps	Goals	Apps	Goals
Varese	2010–11	Serie B	1	0	1	0	—				2	0
Monza (loan)	2010–11	Lega Pro Prima Divisione	8	0	0	0	—				8	0
Bassano Virtus (loan)	2012–13	Lega Pro Seconda Divisione	22	1	0	0	—				22	1
Bassano Virtus (loan)	2013–14	Lega Pro Seconda Divisione	29	2	0	0	—				29	2
Bassano Virtus (loan)	2014–15	Lega Pro	41	3	3	0	—				44	3
Bassano Virtus (loan)	Total		92	6	3	0	0	0	0	0	92	6
Ternana	2015–16	Serie B	40	6	2	0	—				42	6
Bari	2016–17	Serie B	30	1	0	0	—				30	1
Bari	2017–18	Serie B	1	0	1	0	—				2	0
Bari	Total		31	1	1	0	0	0	0	0	32	1
Brescia (loan)	2017–18	Serie B	34	0	0	0	—				34	0
Career totals			206	13	7	0	0	0	0	0	213	13
