= Alessandro Celli =

Italian football player (born 1994)

Personal information
- Date of birth: 28 January 1994 (age 32)
- Place of birth: Rome, Italy
- Height: 1.82 m (6 ft 0 in)
- Position: Left-back

Team information
- Current team: Bari

Youth career
- –2010: Ostia Mare
- 2010–2011: Tor Tre Teste

Senior career*
Years	Team	Apps	(Gls)
2011–2017	Lupa Roma	156	(2)
2017–2018	Foggia	8	(0)
2018–2019	Teramo	20	(3)
2019–2024	Ternana	77	(3)
2023	→ Südtirol (loan)	17	(0)
2024–2026	Catania	54	(0)
2026–	Bari	0	(0)
- * Club domestic league appearances and goals as of 1 May 2026

Alessandro Celli (born 28 January 1994) is an Italian professional footballer who plays as a left-back for Serie C Group C club Bari.

== Club career ==
He made his Serie C debut for Lupa Roma on 31 August 2014 in a game against Lecce.

On 30 November 2018, he signed with Teramo.

On 27 August 2019 he joined Ternana on a 1-year contract.

On 5 January 2023 he went to Südtirol on loan.
