= Guido Marilungo =

Italian footballer

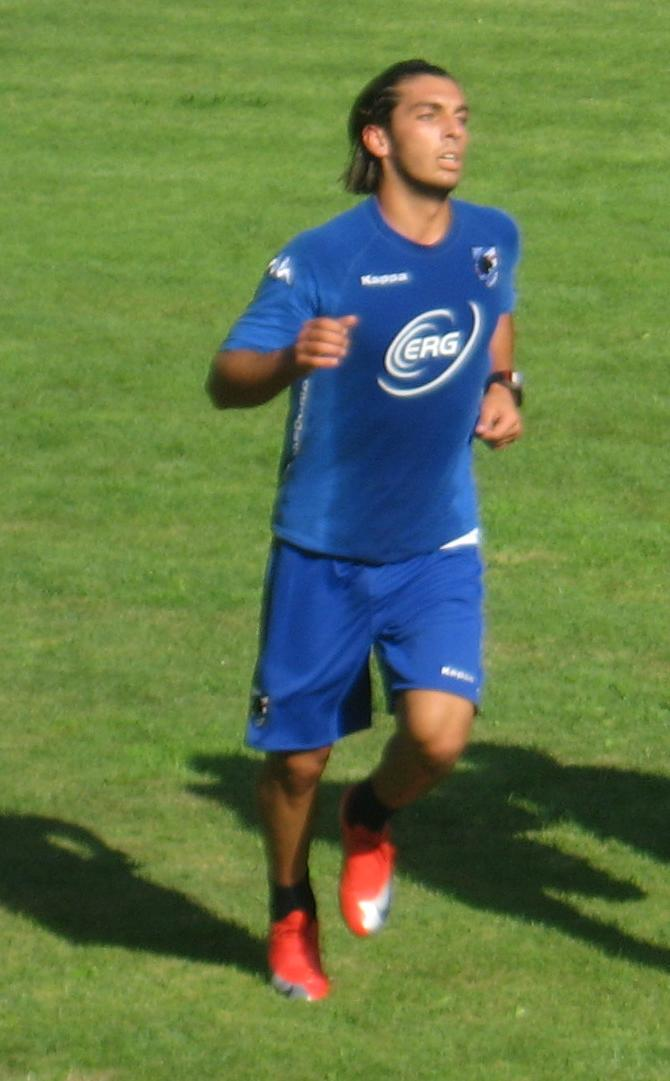

Personal information
- Date of birth: 9 August 1989 (age 37)
- Place of birth: Montegranaro, Italy
- Height: 1.73 m (5 ft 8 in)
- Position: Forward

Youth career
- Montegranaro
- 2003–2008: Sampdoria

Senior career*
Years	Team	Apps	(Gls)
2008–2011	Sampdoria	22	(3)
2009–2010	→ Lecce (loan)	35	(13)
2011–2018	Atalanta	42	(6)
2014–2015	→ Cesena (loan)	32	(6)
2015–2016	→ Lanciano (loan)	34	(7)
2016–2017	→ Empoli (loan)	20	(0)
2017–2018	→ Spezia (loan)	39	(10)
2018–2023	Ternana	66	(13)
2020–2021	→ Monopoli (loan)	13	(0)
2021	→ Carrarese (loan)	20	(5)
2021–2022	→ Pescara (loan)	9	(0)
2022	→ Pro Sesto (loan)	14	(0)
2022–2023	→ Recanatese (loan)	23	(0)
2023–2024	Barletta	14	(2)
2024	MCC Montegranaro		
Total		383	(65)

International career
2009	Italy U20	1	(0)
2009–2010	Italy U21	6	(1)
- * Club domestic league appearances and goals

Guido Marilungo (born 9 August 1989) is an Italian former professional footballer who plays as a forward.

== Club career ==
Born in Montegranaro, the Province of Fermo, in the Marche region, he moved his first footsteps with his hometown club until the age of 14, when he was noted by FIFA agent Silvio Pagliari who proposed him to Sampdoria, which successively chose to sign the player and include him in their Giovanissimi Nazionali (under-15) squad for the 2003–04 season. He was pivotal in the 2007–08 Sampdoria under-20 double (Campionato Nazionale Primavera and Coppa Italia Primavera).

On 11 January 2009, he made his first team debut in a Serie A home league game as a second-half substitute against Palermo, a 2–0 loss for the Genoese club. Three months later, exactly on April 26, 2009, he made his first start in a 3–3 draw with Cagliari, with Marilungo scoring two goals, the first ones in his senior career.

On 27 August 2009, Marilungo joined Serie B outfit Lecce on a one-year loan spell. On 12 September 2010, he signed a 5-year contract to stay with Sampdoria, but only four months later, he joined Atalanta in a 4 1/2-year deal for €4.7 million. Sampdoria relegated at the end of 2010–11 season, with Atlanta promoted to Serie A at the same time.

In 2013 he signed a new contract with Atalanta.

On 17 January 2014, Marilungo was signed by Serie B club Cesena.

On 28 August 2015 Marilungo left Bergamo again for Lanciano. He left Bergamo again for Empoli on 26 August 2016. In the third successive season, Marilungo joined Spezia on loan on 31 August 2017.

On 18 September 2018, he joined Serie C side Ternana on a two-year contract. On 3 October 2020 he moved to Monopoli on loan. On 13 January 2021, he was loaned to Carrarese. On 4 August 2021, he joined Pescara on loan. On 28 January 2022, he moved on a new loan to Pro Sesto. On 13 July 2022, Marilungo was loaned by Recanatese.

== International career ==
On 8 September 2009, he made his debut with the Italy U-21 team in a game against Luxembourg. He scored 1 goal in 6 appearances with the U-21 team.

== Style of play ==
Marilungo started out as an attacking midfielder, although he is capable of playing in several offensive positions, as a main striker, as a second striker, or as a winger, due to his ability to both score and set up goals; he is mainly known for his pace, technique, striking ability with his right foot, and eye for goal. Once considered a promising young player, in 2010, he was named one of the 100 best young footballers in the world born after 1989 by Don Balón.
