= Davide Agazzi =

Italian footballer (born 1993)

Personal information
- Date of birth: 2 June 1993 (age 33)
- Place of birth: Trescore Balneario, Italy
- Height: 1.73 m (5 ft 8 in)
- Position: Midfielder

Team information
- Current team: Campobasso
- Number: 34

Youth career
- –2011: Atalanta

Senior career*
Years	Team	Apps	(Gls)
2011–2019	Atalanta	0	(0)
2012–2014	→ Savona (loan)	65	(0)
2014–2015	→ Virtus Lanciano (loan)	10	(0)
2015–2016	→ Catania (loan)	28	(1)
2016–2018	→ Foggia (loan)	50	(2)
2018–2019	→ Livorno (loan)	30	(0)
2019–2021	Livorno	46	(3)
2021	Vicenza	15	(0)
2021–2023	Ternana	52	(0)
2023–2026	Benevento	28	(1)
2026–	Campobasso	10	(1)
- * Club domestic league appearances and goals as of 30 April 2026

Davide Agazzi (born 2 June 1993) is an Italian footballer who plays as a midfielder for Serie C Group B club Campobasso.

== Club career ==
On 13 July 2018, he joined Serie B club Livorno on a season-long loan.

On 8 July 2019 he joined Livorno permanently earning £9,000 per week.

On 16 January 2021, he returned to Serie B (Livorno was relegated at the end of the 2019–20 season) and signed with Vicenza.

On 5 July 2021, he signed a two-year contract with Ternana.

On 19 August 2023, Agazzi moved to Benevento.
