= Alexis Ferrante =

Italian footballer (born 1995)

Personal information
- Full name: Jonathan Alexis Ferrante
- Date of birth: 27 June 1995 (age 31)
- Place of birth: Buenos Aires, Argentina
- Height: 1.81 m (5 ft 11 1/2 in)
- Position: Forward

Team information
- Current team: Barletta
- Number: 9

Youth career
- Piacenza

Senior career*
Years	Team	Apps	(Gls)
2011–2012	Piacenza	11	(0)
2012–2015	Roma	0	(0)
2013–2014	→ L'Aquila (loan)	1	(0)
2014	→ Lumezzane (loan)	6	(0)
2014–2015	→ Lucchese (loan)	14	(0)
2015	→ Savoia (loan)	9	(2)
2015–2016	Imolese	19	(3)
2016–2017	Abano	16	(9)
2017–2018	Brescia	36	(5)
2018	→ Pisa (loan)	11	(0)
2018–2020	Pescara	0	(0)
2018–2019	→ Fano (loan)	38	(8)
2019–2020	→ Ternana (loan)	29	(7)
2020–2026	Ternana	78	(10)
2021–2022	→ Foggia (loan)	30	(13)
2022–2023	→ Cesena (loan)	35	(2)
2023–2024	→ Benevento (loan)	30	(5)
2026–	Barletta	0	(0)

International career
2011–2012	Italy U17	11	(2)
2012–2013	Italy U18	9	(2)
- * Club domestic league appearances and goals as of 30 April 2026

Jonathan Alexis Ferrante (born 27 June 1995) is a professional footballer who plays as a forward for Serie C club Barletta. Born in Argentina, he has represented Italy at youth level.

== Club career ==
He made his professional debut in the Lega Pro for Piacenza on 4 September 2011 in a game against Südtirol.

On 10 July 2019, he joined Ternana on loan. On 31 January 2020, he transferred to Ternana on a permanent basis and signed a contract until 30 June 2023. On 27 July 2021, he extended his contract with Ternana until 30 June 2024 and was loaned to Foggia for the 2021–22 season.

On 23 August 2022, Ferrante moved to Cesena on loan with an option to buy and a conditional obligation to buy. On 31 August 2023, he moved to Benevento on a new loan with an option to buy and a conditional obligation to buy.
