= 2021–22 Pisa SC season =

Pisa
2021–22 season
- Owner: Alexander Knaster
- Chairman: Giuseppe Corrado
- Manager: Luca D'Angelo
- Stadium: Arena Garibaldi
- Serie B: 3rd
- Play-offs: Runners-up
- Coppa Italia: First round
- Biggest defeat: Benevento 5–1 Pisa
Home colours	Away colours	Third colours

The 2021–22 season was Pisa S.C.'s third consecutive season in second division of the Italian football league, the Serie B, and the 113th as a football club.

== Players ==
=== First-team squad ===
Note: Flags indicate national team as defined under FIFA eligibility rules; some limited exceptions apply. Players may hold more than one non-FIFA nationality.

No.	Pos.	Nation	Player
1	GK	BRA	Nícolas
2	DF	ITA	Filippo Berra
3	DF	FRA	Maxime Leverbe
4	DF	ITA	Antonio Caracciolo
5	MF	LBA	Ahmad Benali (on loan from Crotone)
6	DF	ISL	Hjörtur Hermannsson
7	MF	ITA	Nicholas Siega
8	MF	ROU	Marius Marin
9	FW	ITA	Lorenzo Lucca
10	FW	ITA	Ernesto Torregrossa (on loan from Sampdoria)
11	FW	ISR	Yonatan Cohen
12	GK	ITA	Matteo Kucich
15	MF	GER	Idrissa Touré
16	MF	HUN	Ádám Nagy

No.	Pos.	Nation	Player
17	FW	ITA	Giuseppe Sibilli
18	MF	ITA	Giuseppe Mastinu
19	DF	ITA	Samuele Birindelli
20	DF	ITA	Pietro Beruatto (on loan from Juventus)
22	GK	ITA	Alessandro Livieri
23	DF	ITA	Tommaso Fischer
25	GK	SRB	Vladan Dekić
26	FW	ITA	Gaetano Masucci
27	MF	AUT	Robert Gucher (Captain)
28	MF	ITA	Davide Di Quinzio
30	MF	ITA	Alessandro De Vitis
31	FW	ROU	George Pușcaș (on loan from Reading)
33	DF	ITA	Davide De Marino (on loan from Juventus)
77	FW	ITA	Davide Marsura

=== Out on loan ===
Note: Flags indicate national team as defined under FIFA eligibility rules; some limited exceptions apply. Players may hold more than one non-FIFA nationality.

No.	Pos.	Nation	Player
—	GK	ITA	Leonardo Loria (at Monopoli)
—	DF	ITA	Andrea Beghetto (at Alessandria)
—	DF	ITA	Lorenzo Masetti (at Ancona-Matelica)
—	MF	ITA	Andrea Cisco (at Teramo)
—	MF	ITA	Nicolas Izzillo (at Trento)
—	MF	ITA	Gabriele Piccinini (at Fiorenzuola)
—	MF	ITA	Alessandro Quaini (at Monopoli)
—	MF	ITA	Salvatore Santoro (at Imolese)

No.	Pos.	Nation	Player
—	MF	SEN	Assan Seck (at Fiorentina U19)
—	MF	ITA	Francesco Soldani (at Prato)
—	FW	ITA	Thomas Alberti (at Legnago)
—	FW	ITA	Nicolò Bruschi (at Fiorenzuola)
—	FW	ITA	Elia Giani (at Fiorenzuola)
—	FW	ITA	Christian Sussi (at Paganese)
—	FW	ITA	Christian Tommasini (at Paganese)
—	FW	ITA	Leonardo Ubaldi (at Lucchese)

== Pre-season and friendlies ==
Win Draw Loss

24 July 2021 Friendly	Pisa (Italy)	1–1	(Italy) Cremonese	Rovetta, Italy
17:00 CEST (UTC+2)				Stadium: Centro Sportivo G. Paolo Marinoni

29 July 2021 Friendly	Pisa (Italy)	1–0	(Italy) Pro Sesto	Rovetta, Italy
17:30 CEST (UTC+2)				Stadium: Centro Sportivo G. Paolo Marinoni

== Competitions ==
=== Overall record ===
Competition	First match	Last match	Starting round	Final position	Record							
Competition	First match	Last match	Starting round	Final position	Pld	W	D	L	GF	GA	GD	Win %
Serie B	22 August 2021	6 May 2022	Matchday 1	3rd	38	18	13	7	48	35	+13	47.37
Serie B promotion play-offs	17 May 2022	29 May 2022	Semi-finals	Runners-up	4	1	0	3	5	7	−2	25.00
Coppa Italia	14 August 2021		First round	First round	1	0	0	1	1	3	−2	0.00
Total					43	19	13	11	54	45	+9	44.19

Source: Soccerway

=== Serie B ===
==== League table ====
Pos	Team	Pld	W	D	L	GF	GA	GD	Pts	Promotion, qualification or relegation
1	Lecce (C, P)	38	19	14	5	59	31	+28	71	Promotion to Serie A
2	Cremonese (P)	38	20	9	9	57	39	+18	69	Promotion to Serie A
3	Pisa	38	18	13	7	48	35	+13	67 (Note: Pisa finished ahead of Monza on head-to-head points: Pisa 2–1 Monza, Monza 1–2 Pisa.)	Qualification for promotion play-offs semi-finals
4	Monza (O, P)	38	19	10	9	60	38	+22	67	Qualification for promotion play-offs semi-finals
5	Brescia	38	17	15	6	55	35	+20	66	Qualification for promotion play-offs preliminary round

Source: Lega Serie B (in Italian), Soccerway (in English)
Rules for classification: 1) Points; 2) Head-to-head points; 3) Head-to-head goal difference; 4) Goal difference; 5) Goals scored; 6) Draw.
(C) Champions; (O) Play-off winners; (P) Promoted

==== Results summary ====
Overall								Home						Away					
Pld	W	D	L	GF	GA	GD	Pts	W	D	L	GF	GA	GD	W	D	L	GF	GA	GD
38	18	13	7	48	35	+13	67	10	8	1	26	13	+13	8	5	6	22	22	0

Source: Serie B

==== Results by round ====
Round	1	2	3	4	5	6	7	8	9	10	11	12	13	14	15	16	17	18	19	20	21	22	23	24	25	26	27	28	29	30	31	32	33	34	35	36	37	38
Ground																																						
Result	W	W	W	W	W	D	W	L	D	D	D	L	W	W	D	W	W	W	L	D	D	D	D	W	D	L	W	W	W	L	W	L	D	D	W	L	D	W
Position	7	3	2	1	1	1	1	1	1	1	1	3	2	1	2	1	1	1	1	1	2	3	4	3	4	5	4	3	1	3	2	3	4	6	5	4	4	3

Source: Serie B
A = Away; H = Home; W = Win; D = Draw; L = Loss

==== Matches ====
The league fixtures were announced on 24 July 2021.

22 August 2021 1	Pisa	1–0	SPAL	Pisa
20:30 CET	Sibilli 1'; Caracciolo (yellow card) 24'; Marin (yellow card) 73'	Report	Viviani (yellow card) 12'; Dickmann (yellow card) 16'; Colombo (yellow card) 53'; Ellertsson (yellow card) 67'	Stadium: Arena Garibaldi – Stadio Romeo Anconetani; Attendance: 2,933; Referee: (Italy) Giacomo Camplone

27 August 2021 2	Pisa	2–0	Alessandria	Pisa
18:00 CET	Marin (yellow card) 68'; De Vitis (yellow card) 74'; Lucca 80' 85'	Report	Mantovani (yellow card) 59'; Benedetti (yellow card) 65'	Stadium: Arena Garibaldi – Stadio Romeo Anconetani; Attendance: 3,882; Referee: (Italy) Francesco Cosso

11 September 2021 3	Ternana	1–4	Pisa	Terni
16:15 CET	Donnarumma 30' (pen.); Ghiringhelli (yellow card) 47'; Sørensen (yellow card) 64'	Report	De Vitis 9'; Sørensen 32' (o.g.); Lucca 57'; Gucher (yellow card) 58'; Leverbe (yellow card) 82'; Cohen 84'	Stadium: Stadio Libero Liberati; Attendance: 4,003; Referee: (Italy) Fabio Maresca

18 September 2021 4	Vicenza	1–3	Pisa	Vicenza
16:15 CET	Proia 30'; Bruscagin (yellow card) 38'; Ranocchia (yellow card) 46'; Meggiorini (yellow card) 64'; Di Pardo (yellow card) 66'; Giacomelli (yellow card) 90+2'	Report	Touré 43'; Birindelli 81'; Nícolas (yellow card) 87'; Mastinu 90+2' (yellow card) 90+2'	Stadium: Stadio Romeo Menti; Attendance: 3,372; Referee: (Italy) Davide Massa

21 September 2021 5	Pisa	2–1	Monza	Pisa
20:30 CET	Sibilli 7'; Caracciolo (yellow card) 44'; Lucca 53'; Hermannsson (yellow card) 78'; Masucci (yellow card) 85'	Report	Mazzitelli (yellow card) 13'; Valoti (yellow card) 37'; Caldirola (red card) 47'; Dany Mota 64'; José Machín (yellow card) 71'; Carlos Augusto (yellow card) 81'	Stadium: Arena Garibaldi – Stadio Romeo Anconetani; Attendance: 4,635; Referee: (Italy) Luca Pairetto

26 September 2021 6	Parma	1–1	Pisa	Parma
16:15 CET	Del Prato (yellow card) 11' (goal) 53'; Vázquez (yellow card) 27'	Report	Lucca 13'; Nagy (yellow card) 38'; Caracciolo (yellow card) 54'; Marin (yellow card) 59'	Stadium: Stadio Ennio Tardini; Attendance: 7,245; Referee: (Italy) Alessandro Prontera

2 October 2021 7	Pisa	2–0	Reggina	Pisa
16:15 CET	Cionek 6' (o.g.); Lucca 68' (pen.); Sibilli (yellow card) 71'; Caracciolo (yellow card) 90+3'	Report	Micai (red card) 64'; Crisetig (yellow card) 80'; Di Chiara (yellow card) 90+1'	Stadium: Arena Garibaldi – Stadio Romeo Anconetani; Attendance: 5,029; Referee: (Italy) Andrea Colombo

16 October 2021 8	Crotone	2–1	Pisa	Crotone
14:00 CET	Mulattieri 2'; Zanellato 24'; Borello (yellow card) 27'; Mogoș (yellow card) 32'; Molina (yellow card) 80'; Giannotti (yellow card) 90+7'	Report	Touré 45+1'; Birindelli (yellow card) 47'	Stadium: Stadio Ezio Scida; Attendance: 1,962; Referee: (Italy) Niccoló Baroni

24 October 2021 9	Pisa	1–1	Pordenone	Pisa
14:00 CET	Marin (yellow card) 33'; Caracciolo 57'	Report	El Kaouakibi (yellow card) 65'; Folorunsho 90+6' (yellow card) 90+7'	Stadium: Arena Garibaldi – Stadio Romeo Anconetani; Attendance: 5,712; Referee: (Italy) Paride Tremolada

28 October 2021 10	Cremonese	1–1	Pisa	Cremona
20:30 CET	Ciofani 90+3'	Report	De Vitis (yellow card) 14'; Birindelli (yellow card) 26'; Beruatto 34'; Marin (yellow card) 52'; Sibilli (yellow card) 57'	Stadium: Stadio Giovanni Zini; Attendance: 5,543; Referee: (Italy) Daniele Orsato

1 November 2021 11	Pisa	1–1	Ascoli	Pisa
18:00 CET	Masucci 24'; Birindelli (yellow card) 24'; Leverbe (yellow card) 39'; Beruatto (yellow card) 42'	Report	Dionisi (yellow card) 21' (goal) 40' (pen.); Büchel (yellow card) 32'; Iliev (yellow card) 60'; Collocolo (yellow card) 90'	Stadium: Arena Garibaldi – Stadio Romeo Anconetani; Attendance: 4,732; Referee: (Italy) Matteo Marcenaro

7 November 2021 12	Cittadella	2–0	Pisa	Cittadella
20:30 CET	Perticone (yellow card) 45+1'; Antonucci 47'; Benedetti (yellow card) 55'; Baldini (yellow card) 58' (goal) 90+1'	Report	Lucca (yellow card) 17' (yellow-red card) 68'; Beruatto (yellow card) 22'; Nagy (red card) 39'; Touré (red card) 59'	Stadium: Stadio Pier Cesare Tombolato; Attendance: 1,742; Referee: (Italy) Francesco Meraviglia

21 November 2021 13	Pisa	1–0	Benevento	Pisa
20:30 CET	Cohen 7' (yellow card) 18'; Sibilli (yellow card) 90+2'	Report	Insigne (yellow card) 9'; Letizia (yellow card) 53'; Barba (yellow card) 83'	Stadium: Arena Garibaldi – Stadio Romeo Anconetani; Attendance: 5,208; Referee: (Italy) Maurizio Mariani

27 November 2021 14	Brescia	0–1	Pisa	Brescia
16:15 CET	Cistana (yellow card) 46'; van de Looi (yellow card) 65'; Chancellor (yellow card) 69'; Špalek (yellow card) 90+5'; Jagiełło (yellow card) 90+7'	Report	Birindelli (yellow card) 38'; Leverbe (yellow card) 52'; Sibilli 70'; Lucca (yellow card) 86'; Di Quinzio (yellow card) 90'; Caracciolo (yellow card) 90+6'	Stadium: Stadio Mario Rigamonti; Attendance: 6,221; Referee: (Italy) Simone Sozza

30 November 2021 15	Pisa	1–1	Perugia	Pisa
18:00 CET	Marsura 11'; Beruatto (yellow card) 21'; Birindelli (yellow card) 43'; Hermannsson (yellow card) 75'	Report	Kouan (yellow card) 22'; Zanandrea (yellow card) 56' (yellow-red card) 79'; De Luca 72' (pen.)	Stadium: Stadio Mario Rigamonti; Attendance: 4,127; Referee: (Italy) Gianpiero Miele

5 December 2021 16	Como	0–1	Pisa	Como
14:00 CET	Arrigoni (yellow card) 62'; Scaglia (yellow card) 90+1'; Solini (yellow card) 90+4'	Report	Scaglia 5' (o.g.); Beruatto (yellow card) 75'; Masucci (yellow card) 90+5'	Stadium: Stadio Giuseppe Sinigaglia; Attendance: 2,540; Referee: (Italy) Daniele Doveri

11 December 2021 17	Pisa	1–0	Lecce	Pisa
16:15 CET	Gucher (yellow card) 21'; Nagy (yellow card) 50'; Sibilli 58'; Touré (yellow card) 90+2'	Report	Hjulmand (yellow card) 16'; Barreca (yellow card) 29'; Majer (yellow card) 77'; Calabresi (yellow card) 88'	Stadium: Arena Garibaldi – Stadio Romeo Anconetani; Attendance: 7,041; Referee: (Italy) Daniele Orsato

18 December 2021 18	Cosenza	0–2	Pisa	Cosenza
14:00 CET	Carraro (yellow card) 38'; Tiritello (yellow card) 90+3'	Report	Touré 9' (yellow card) 36'; Di Quinzio (yellow card) 34'; Cohen 52' (pen.); Piccinini (yellow card) 76'	Stadium: Stadio San Vito-Gigi Marulla; Attendance: 2,079; Referee: (Italy) Daniele Chiffi

15 January 2022 19	Pisa	1–3	Frosinone	Pisa
16:15 CET	Leverbe (yellow card) 19'; Marsura 45'; Hermannsson (yellow card) 48'; Beruatto (yellow card) 62'	Report	Gatti (yellow card) 36'; Cotali (yellow card) 45+2'; Zerbin 47' 71' (yellow card) 84'; Zampano (yellow card) 56'; Szymiński (yellow card) 72'; Novakovich 85'	Stadium: Arena Garibaldi – Stadio Romeo Anconetani; Attendance: 3,047; Referee: (Italy) Francesco Cosso

22 January 2022 20	SPAL	0–0	Pisa	Ferrara
14:00 CET	Vicari (yellow card) 25'; Mora (yellow card) 61'; Mancosu (yellow card) 72'	Report	Caracciolo (yellow card) 26'; Birindelli (yellow card) 51'; Mastinu (yellow card) 82'; Lucca (yellow card) 88'	Stadium: Stadio Paolo Mazza; Attendance: 2,859; Referee: (Italy) Giovanni Ayroldi

5 February 2022 21	Alessandria	1–1	Pisa	Alessandria
14:00 CET	Marconi 37' (pen.); Chiarello (yellow card) 53'	Report	Torregrossa (yellow card) 29' (goal) 43' (pen.); Marin (yellow card) 60'; Masucci (yellow card) 75'	Stadium: Stadio Giuseppe Moccagatta; Attendance: 2,099; Referee: (Italy) Ivano Pezzuto

12 February 2022 22	Pisa	0–0	Ternana	Pisa
14:00 CET		Report	Sørensen (yellow card) 36'; Paghera (yellow card) 50'; Palumbo (yellow card) 59'; Ghiringhelli (yellow card) 63'	Stadium: Arena Garibaldi – Stadio Romeo Anconetani; Attendance: 4,446; Referee: (Italy) Davide Ghersini

15 February 2022 23	Pisa	2–2	Vicenza	Pisa
18:30 CET	Cohen 43'; Caracciolo 60' (yellow card) 89'; Torregrossa (yellow card) 76'	Report	Cavion 17'; Diaw 22' (yellow card) 52'; Brosco (yellow card) 59'; Bikel (yellow card) 62'; Contini (yellow card) 72'	Stadium: Arena Garibaldi – Stadio Romeo Anconetani; Attendance: 3,057; Referee: (Italy) Antonio Di Martino

19 February 2022 24	Monza	1–2	Pisa	Monza
14:00 CET	Valoti 8' (yellow card) 83'; Carlos Augusto (yellow card) 90+1'	Report	Pușcaș 18' (yellow card) 44'; Mastinu (yellow card) 54'; Pedro Pereira 65' (o.g.); Hermannsson (yellow card) 75'; Lucca (yellow card) 90+1'	Stadium: U-Power Stadium; Attendance: 4,572; Referee: (Italy) Fabio Maresca

22 February 2022 25	Pisa	0–0	Parma	Pisa
18:30 CET	Touré (yellow card) 73'; Marin (yellow card) 78'	Report	Adrián Bernabé (yellow card) 55'; Danilo (yellow card) 77'; Cobbaut (yellow card) 90+1'	Stadium: Arena Garibaldi – Stadio Romeo Anconetani; Attendance: 5,560; Referee: (Italy) Rosario Abisso

27 February 2022 26	Reggina	1–0	Pisa	Reggio Calabria
15:30 CET	Ménez 12' (yellow card) 86'; Amione (yellow card) 90+3'	Report	Berra (yellow card) 23'; Touré (yellow card) 35'; Lucca (yellow card) 76'; Beruatto (yellow card) 79'; Mastinu (yellow card) 90+6'	Stadium: Stadio Oreste Granillo; Attendance: 3,597; Referee: (Italy) Luca Massimi

2 March 2022 27	Pisa	3–2	Crotone	Pisa
18:30 CET	Pușcaș 22' (yellow card) 30'; Benali 37'; Torregrossa 45'; Siega (yellow card) 54'; Hermannsson (yellow card) 59'	Report	Kone (yellow card) 23'; Golemić (yellow card) 55'; Mogoș 60'; Cuomo 69'; Nedelcearu (yellow card) 90+2'	Stadium: Arena Garibaldi – Stadio Romeo Anconetani; Attendance: 3,623; Referee: (Italy) Francesco Cosso

5 March 2022 28	Pordenone	0–1	Pisa	Lignano Sabbiadoro
14:00 CET	Torrasi (yellow card) 40'; Di Serio (yellow card) 56'; Lovisa (yellow card) 60'; Dalle Mura (yellow card) 75'	Report	Torregrossa 26' (yellow card) 42'; Marin (yellow card) 36'; Mastinu (yellow card) 82'	Stadium: Stadio Guido Teghil; Attendance: 717; Referee: (Italy) Matteo Marcenaro

13 March 2022 29	Pisa	3–0	Cremonese	Pisa
15:30 CET	Torregrossa 9' (pen.) 50'; Marin (yellow card) 34'; Birindelli (yellow card) 40'; Sibilli (yellow card) 69'; Nagy (yellow card) 72'; Pușcaș 89'	Report	Okoli (yellow card) 14'; Valeri (yellow card) 60'; Báez (yellow card) 65'	Stadium: Arena Garibaldi – Stadio Romeo Anconetani; Attendance: 7,374; Referee: (Italy) Alessandro Prontera

16 March 2022 30	Ascoli	2–0	Pisa	Ascoli Piceno
18:30 CET	Tsadjout (yellow card) 21'; Dionisi 41' 45'	Report	Birindelli (yellow card) 38'; Cohen (yellow card) 90+2'	Stadium: Stadio Cino e Lillo Del Duca; Attendance: 4,027; Referee: (Italy) Valerio Marini

20 March 2022 31	Pisa	1–0	Cittadella	Pisa
14:00 CET	Lucca (yellow card) 8'; Siega (yellow card) 35'; Torregrossa 39'; Marin (yellow card) 65'; Mastinu (yellow card) 82'; Caracciolo (yellow card) 89'	Report	Branca (yellow card) 12'; Frare (yellow card) 21' (yellow-red card) 70'; Cassandro (yellow card) 90+3'	Stadium: Arena Garibaldi – Stadio Romeo Anconetani; Attendance: 5,441; Referee: (Italy) Gianluca Aureliano

2 April 2022 32	Benevento	5–1	Pisa	Benevento
16:15 CET	Ioniță 3'; Caracciolo 32' (o.g.); Improta 49'; Forte 69'; Tello 88'	Report	Mastinu (yellow card) 10'; Nagy (yellow card) 38'; Siega (yellow card) 62'; Pușcaș 85'	Stadium: Stadio Ciro Vigorito; Attendance: 3,409; Referee: (Italy) Antonio Di Martino

6 April 2022 33	Pisa	0–0	Brescia	Pisa
19:00 CET	Beruatto (yellow card) 46'; Lucca (red card) 83'	Report	Moreo (yellow card) 26'; Cistana (yellow card) 66'; Karačić (yellow card) 90+1'	Stadium: Arena Garibaldi – Stadio Romeo Anconetani; Attendance: 7,271; Referee: (Italy) Alberto Santoro

10 April 2022 34	Perugia	1–1	Pisa	Perugia
18:00 CET	Dell'Orco (yellow card) 48'; Curado 67' (yellow card) 88'	Report	Pușcaș 28'; Hermannsson (yellow card) 62'; Torregrossa (yellow card) 90+2'	Stadium: Stadio Renato Curi; Attendance: 5,042; Referee: (Italy) Davide Massa

18 April 2022 35	Pisa	3–1	Como	Pisa
18:00 CET	Pușcaș 7' 78'; Mastinu (yellow card) 55'; Torregrossa 68' (pen.); Touré (yellow card) 90'; Beruatto (yellow card) 90+7'	Report	Gliozzi 63'; Bellemo (yellow card) 90+7'	Stadium: Arena Garibaldi – Stadio Romeo Anconetani; Attendance: 6,218; Referee: (Italy) Ivano Pezzuto

25 April 2022 36	Lecce	2–0	Pisa	Lecce
15:00 CET	Lucioni 18'; Gallo (yellow card) 65'; Coda (yellow card) 73'; Tuia (yellow card) 76'; Faragò 85'	Report	Marin (yellow card) 63'; Caracciolo (yellow card) 78'; Leverbe (yellow card) 90+1'	Stadium: Stadio Via del mare Attendance: 23,933; Referee: (Italy) Luca Pairetto

30 April 2022 37	Pisa	1–1	Cosenza	Pisa
14:00 CET	Venturi 6' (o.g.); Caracciolo (yellow card) 21'; Hermansson (yellow card) 23'; Beruatto (yellow card) 77'; Masucci (yellow card) 89'	Report	Caso (yellow card) 45'; Liotti 79' (pen.); Ndoj (yellow card) 89'	Stadium: Arena Garibaldi – Stadio Romeo Anconetani; Attendance: 7,332; Referee: (Italy) Eugenio Abbattista

6 May 2022 38	Frosinone	1–2	Pisa	Frosinone
20:30 CET	Barišić (yellow card) 18'; Leverbe 65' (o.g.); Ciano (yellow card) 71'; Rohdén (yellow card) 76'; Cotali (yellow card) 85'	Report	Pușcaș 16'; Leverbe (yellow card) 19'; Sibilli 20'; Nícolas (yellow card) 48'; Marin (yellow card) 71'	Stadium: Stadio Benito Stirpe; Attendance: 8,927; Referee: (Italy) Antonio Rapuano

==== Promotion play-offs ====
17 May 2022 Semi-finals; First leg	Benevento	1–0	Pisa	Benevento
20:30 CEST (UTC+2)	Lapadula 85'	Report		Stadium: Stadio Ciro Vigorito; Attendance: 10,979; Referee: Alessandro Prontera

21 May 2022 Semi-finals; Second leg	Pisa	1–0 (1–1 agg.)	Benevento	Pisa
18:00 CEST (UTC+2)	Benali 11'	Report		Stadium: Arena Garibaldi; Attendance: 9,942; Referee: Simone Sozza

26 May 2022 Final; First leg	Monza	2–1	Pisa	Monza
20:30 CEST (UTC+2)	Mota 9'; Gytkjær 74'	Report	Berra 90+3'	Stadium: Stadio Brianteo; Attendance: 9,649; Referee: Marco Guida

29 May 2022 Final; Second leg	Pisa	3–4 (4–6 agg.)	Monza	Pisa
20:30 CEST (UTC+2)	Torregrossa 1'; Hermannsson 9'; Mastinu 90'	Report	Machín 20'; Gytkjær 79', 101'; Marrone 96'	Stadium: Arena Garibaldi; Attendance: 9,942; Referee: Maurizio Mariani

=== Coppa Italia ===
14 August 2021 First round	Cagliari	3–1	Pisa	Cagliari
21:00 CEST (UTC+2)	Marin 28', (yellow card) 84'; Caracciolo 36' (o.g.); Deiola 45+3'; Zappa (yellow card) 51'	Report	Masucci 67'; Touré (yellow card) 82'	Stadium: Sardegna Arena; Attendance: 2,620; Referee: Gianluca Manganiello
