= 2022–23 Pisa SC season =

Pisa S.C.
2022–23 season
- Owner: Alexander Knaster
- Chairman: Giuseppe Corrado
- Manager: Rolando Maran
- Stadium: Arena Garibaldi
- Serie B: 11th
- Coppa Italia: Round of 64
Home colours	Away colours	Third colours

The 2022–23 season was the 114th in the history of Pisa S.C. and their fourth consecutive season in the second division. The club participated in Serie B and Coppa Italia.

== Players ==
As of 2 September 2022

Note: Flags indicate national team as defined under FIFA eligibility rules; some limited exceptions apply. Players may hold more than one non-FIFA nationality.

No.	Pos.	Nation	Player
1	GK	BRA	Nícolas
4	DF	ITA	Antonio Caracciolo
5	DF	ITA	Simone Canestrelli (on loan from Empoli)
6	DF	ISL	Hjörtur Hermannsson
7	MF	CRO	Roko Jureškin
8	MF	ROU	Marius Marin
9	FW	ITA	Ettore Gliozzi
10	FW	ITA	Ernesto Torregrossa (on loan from Sampdoria)
12	GK	SRB	Vladan Dekić
15	MF	GER	Idrissa Touré
16	MF	HUN	Ádám Nagy
17	FW	ITA	Giuseppe Sibilli
18	FW	ITA	Giuseppe Mastinu
19	DF	POR	Tomás Esteves (on loan from Porto)
20	DF	ITA	Pietro Beruatto

No.	Pos.	Nation	Player
22	GK	ITA	Alessandro Livieri
23	MF	MDA	Artur Ioniță
26	FW	ITA	Gaetano Masucci
27	MF	FRA	Mattéo Tramoni
30	MF	ITA	Alessandro De Vitis
33	DF	ITA	Arturo Calabresi
36	FW	ITA	Gabriele Piccinini
42	MF	SLO	Miha Trdan
43	DF	SLO	David Beršnjak
44	DF	ROU	Adrian Rus
77	FW	FRA	Lisandru Tramoni
80	MF	ROU	Olimpiu Moruțan (on loan from Galatasaray)
93	DF	ITA	Federico Barba
99	FW	GUI	Moustapha Cissé (on loan from Atalanta)
—	MF	AUT	Robert Gucher

=== Other players under contract ===
Note: Flags indicate national team as defined under FIFA eligibility rules; some limited exceptions apply. Players may hold more than one non-FIFA nationality.

No.	Pos.	Nation	Player
—	MF	ITA	Salvatore Santoro

=== Out on loan ===
Note: Flags indicate national team as defined under FIFA eligibility rules; some limited exceptions apply. Players may hold more than one non-FIFA nationality.

No.	Pos.	Nation	Player
—	GK	ITA	Leonardo Loria (at Frosinone until 30 June 2023)
—	DF	ITA	Andrea Beghetto (at Perugia until 30 June 2023)
—	DF	FRA	Maxime Leverbe (at Benevento until 30 June 2023)
—	DF	ITA	Lorenzo Masetti (at Piacenza until 30 June 2023)
—	MF	ITA	Andrea Cisco (at Virtus Francavilla until 30 June 2023)
—	MF	ITA	Davide Di Quinzio (at Lucchese until 30 June 2023)
—	MF	ITA	Nicolas Izzillo (at Pontedera until 30 June 2023)

No.	Pos.	Nation	Player
—	MF	ITA	Christian Sussi (at Fiorenzuola until 30 June 2023)
—	FW	ISR	Yonatan Cohen (at Maccabi Tel Aviv until 30 June 2023, obligation to buy)
—	FW	ITA	Elia Giani (at Fiorenzuola until 30 June 2023)
—	FW	ITA	Lorenzo Lucca (at Ajax until 30 June 2023)
—	FW	SEN	Assan Seck (at Empoli U19 until 30 June 2023)
—	FW	ITA	Christian Tommasini (at Taranto until 30 June 2023)
—	FW	ITA	Leonardo Ubaldi (to San Donato Tavarnelle until 30 June 2023)

== Pre-season and friendlies ==
Win Draw Loss Fixtures

21 July 2022 Friendly	Pisa (Italy)	5–0	(Italy) Palermo	Rovetta
18:00 CEST (UTC+2)	Lucca 2' (pen.), 23'; Mastinu 16', 28'; Berra 65'			Stadium: Centro Sportivo G. Paolo Marinoni; Referee: Simone Sozza

30 July 2022 Friendly	Pisa (Italy)	2–0	(Italy) Virtus Entella	Pisa
17:45 CEST (UTC+2)				Stadium: Centro Preparazione Olimpica di Tirrenia

== Competitions ==
=== Overall record ===
Competition	First match	Last match	Starting round	Final position	Record							
Competition	First match	Last match	Starting round	Final position	Pld	W	D	L	GF	GA	GD	Win %
Serie B	13 August 2022	19 May 2023	Matchday 1	11th	38	11	14	13	48	42	+6	28.95
Coppa Italia	6 August 2022		Round of 64	Round of 64	1	0	0	1	1	4	−3	0.00
Total					39	11	14	14	49	46	+3	28.21

Source: Soccerway

=== Serie B ===
==== League table ====
Pos	Team	Pld	W	D	L	GF	GA	GD	Pts
9	Palermo	38	11	16	11	48	49	−1	49
10	Modena	38	13	9	16	47	53	−6	48
11	Pisa	38	11	14	13	48	42	+6	47 (Note: Head-to-head points: Pisa 5, Ascoli 5, Como 4. Head-to-head goal difference: Pisa +1, Ascoli −1.)
12	Ascoli	38	12	11	15	40	47	−7	47
13	Como	38	10	17	11	47	48	−1	47

Source: Soccerway (in English)
Rules for classification: 1) Points; 2) Head-to-head points; 3) Head-to-head goal difference; 4) Goal difference; 5) Goals scored; 6) Draw.

==== Results summary ====
Overall								Home						Away					
Pld	W	D	L	GF	GA	GD	Pts	W	D	L	GF	GA	GD	W	D	L	GF	GA	GD
0	0	0	0	0	0	0	0	0	0	0	0	0	0	0	0	0	0	0	0

Last updated: August 2022.
Source: Serie B

==== Results by round ====
Round	1	2
Ground	A	
Result		
Position		

Updated to match(es) played on August 2022. Source: Serie B
A = Away; H = Home; W = Win; D = Draw; L = Loss

==== Matches ====
The league fixtures were announced on 15 July 2022.

13 August 2022 1	Cittadella	v	Pisa	Cittadella
20:45 CEST (UTC+2)				Stadium: Stadio Pier Cesare Tombolato

=== Coppa Italia ===
6 August 2022 Round of 64	Pisa	1–4	Brescia	Pisa
17:45 CEST (UTC+2)	Masucci 20'	Report	Nícolas 25' (o.g.); Karačić (yellow card) 36'; Ayé 61'; Moreo (yellow card) 66'; Ndoj 72'; Bianchi 90+4'	Stadium: Arena Garibaldi; Referee: Matteo Gariglio
