= 2020–21 AC Pisa 1909 season =

Pisa
- Chairman: Giuseppe Corrado
- Manager: Luca D'Angelo
- Stadium: Arena Garibaldi
- Serie B: 14th
- Coppa Italia: Third round
Home colours	Away colours	Third colours

The 2020–21 season was A.C. Pisa 1909's second consecutive season in second division of the Italian football league, the Serie B, and the 112th as a football club.

== Players ==
=== First-team quad ===
As of 31 January 2021

Note: Flags indicate national team as defined under FIFA eligibility rules; some limited exceptions apply. Players may hold more than one non-FIFA nationality.

No.	Pos.	Nation	Player
1	GK	ITA	Simone Perilli
2	DF	ITA	Samuele Birindelli
3	DF	ITA	Eros Pisano
4	DF	ITA	Francesco Belli
7	MF	ITA	Nicholas Siega
8	DF	ITA	Antonio Caracciolo
9	FW	ITA	Simone Palombi (on loan from Lazio)
10	MF	ITA	Danilo Soddimo
11	MF	ITA	Giuseppe Mastinu
13	DF	ITA	Andrea Meroni (on loan from Sassuolo)
14	MF	ROU	Marius Marin
17	FW	ITA	Giuseppe Sibilli
19	FW	ITA	Luca Vido (on loan from Atalanta)
21	MF	ITA	Alessandro Quaini

No.	Pos.	Nation	Player
22	GK	ITA	Leonardo Loria
23	DF	ITA	Francesco Lisi
24	DF	ITA	Marco Varnier (on loan from Atalanta)
25	DF	ITA	Lorenzo Masetti
26	FW	ITA	Gaetano Masucci
27	MF	AUT	Robert Gucher (Captain)
30	MF	ITA	Alessandro De Vitis
31	FW	ITA	Michele Marconi
32	DF	ITA	Andrea Beghetto (on loan from Frosinone)
33	DF	ITA	Simone Benedetti
35	DF	ITA	Tommaso Fischer
36	MF	ITA	Luca Mazzitelli (on loan from Sassuolo)
66	GK	ITA	Stefano Gori (on loan from Juventus)
77	FW	ITA	Davide Marsura

=== Out on loan ===
Note: Flags indicate national team as defined under FIFA eligibility rules; some limited exceptions apply. Players may hold more than one non-FIFA nationality.

No.	Pos.	Nation	Player
—	GK	ITA	Matteo Kucich (at Cavese)
—	GK	ITA	Alessandro Livieri (at Pro Sesto)
—	GK	SRB	Vladan Dekić (at Casertana)
—	DF	ITA	Gianmarco Ingrosso (at Cosenza)
—	DF	ITA	Riccardo Perazzolo (at Paganese)
—	MF	ITA	Christian Langella (at Renate)

No.	Pos.	Nation	Player
—	MF	ITA	Roberto Zammarini (at Pordenone)
—	MF	ITA	Mattia Minesso (at Perugia, obligation to buy)
—	FW	ITA	Thomas Alberti (at Matelica)
—	FW	ITA	Elia Giani (at Pontedera)
—	FW	ITA	Claudio Maffei (at Pro Sesto)
—	FW	ITA	Christian Tommasini (at Imolese)

== Pre-season and friendlies ==
Win Draw Loss

13 September 2020 Friendly	Sassuolo (Italy)	1–0	(Italy) Pisa	Reggio Emilia, Italy
18:00 CEST (UTC+2)	Đuričić 36'			Stadium: Mapei Stadium; Attendance: 0
Note: 45 minute match.

13 September 2020 Friendly	Pisa (Italy)	1–0	(Italy) Sassuolo	Reggio Emilia, Italy
20:00 CEST (UTC+2)	Marconi 27'	Report		Stadium: Mapei Stadium; Attendance: 0
Note: 45 minute match.

19 September 2020 Friendly	Internazionale (Italy)	7–0	(Italy) Pisa	Milan
18:00 CEST (UTC+2)	Lukaku 5'; Gagliardini 11'; Martínez 15', 35', 37'; Eriksen 20', 74'			Stadium: San Siro; Attendance: 0 Referee: Kevin Bonacina

== Competitions ==
=== Overall record ===
Competition	First match	Last match	Starting round	Final position	Record							
Competition	First match	Last match	Starting round	Final position	Pld	W	D	L	GF	GA	GD	Win %
Serie B	27 September 2020	10 May 2021	Matchday 1	14th	38	11	15	12	54	59	−5	28.95
Coppa Italia	30 September 2020	27 October 2020	Second round	Third round	2	1	0	1	3	3	+0	50.00
Total					40	12	15	13	57	62	−5	30.00

Source: Soccerway

=== Serie B ===
==== League table ====
Pos	Team	Pld	W	D	L	GF	GA	GD	Pts
12	Vicenza	38	11	15	12	48	53	−5	48 (Note: Head-to-head points: Vicenza 8, Cremonese 4, Pisa 3.)
13	Cremonese	38	12	12	14	46	44	+2	48
14	Pisa	38	11	15	12	54	59	−5	48
15	Pordenone	38	10	15	13	40	39	+1	45
16	Ascoli (Note: Since the 16th-placed team Ascoli finished more than 4 points ahead of the 17th-placed team Cosenza, the relegation play-out was not played and Cosenza were originally relegated directly. However, Cosenza was ultimately spared from relegation following Chievo's bankruptcy and subsequent dissolution.)	38	11	11	16	37	48	−11	44

Source: Lega Serie B (in Italian), Soccerway (in English)
Rules for classification: 1) Points; 2) Head-to-head points; 3) Head-to-head goal difference; 4) Goal difference; 5) Goals scored; 6) Draw.

==== Results summary ====
Overall								Home						Away					
Pld	W	D	L	GF	GA	GD	Pts	W	D	L	GF	GA	GD	W	D	L	GF	GA	GD
38	11	15	12	54	59	−5	48	7	10	2	26	19	+7	4	5	10	28	40	−12

Source: Serie B

==== Results by round ====
Round	1	2	3	4	5	6	7	8	9	10	11	12	13	14	15	16	17	18	19	20	21	22	23	24	25	26	27	28	29	30	31	32	33	34	35	36	37	38
Ground	A	H	A	H	A	A	H	A	H	A	H	H	A	H	A	H	A	H	A	H	A	H	A	H	H	A	H	A	H	A	A	H	A	H	A	H	A	H
Result	D	D	L	D	L	D	W	W	L	L	W	D	W	D	D	D	D	W	L	W	L	D	W	D	D	W	D	L	W	D	L	L	L	W	L	D	L	W
Position	4	9	17	18	18	17	17	14	16	14	13	13	12	11	10	12	12	11	11	11	11	11	11	10	9	9	9	9	9	9	11	12	13	12	13	13	13	14

Source: Serie B
A = Away; H = Home; W = Win; D = Draw; L = Loss

==== Matches ====
27 September 2020 1	Reggiana	2–2	Pisa	Reggio Emilia
CEST (UTC+2)				Stadium: Mapei Stadium – Città del Tricolore

4 October 2020 2	Pisa	1–1	Cremonese	Pisa
CEST (UTC+2)				Stadium: Arena Garibaldi

17 October 2020 3	Salernitana	4–1	Pisa	Salerno
CEST (UTC+2)				Stadium: Stadio Arechi

20 October 2020 4	Pisa	1–1	Monza	Pisa
CEST (UTC+2)				Stadium: Arena Garibaldi

23 October 2020 5	Empoli	3–1	Pisa	Empoli
CEST (UTC+2)				Stadium: Stadio Carlo Castellani

31 October 2020 6	Vicenza	4–4	Pisa	Vicenza
CET (UTC+1)				Stadium: Stadio Romeo Menti

22 November 2020 8	Reggina	1–2	Pisa	Reggio Calabria
CET (UTC+1)				Stadium: Stadio Oreste Granillo

28 November 2020 9	Pisa	1–4	Cittadella	Pisa
CET (UTC+1)				Stadium: Arena Garibaldi

5 December 2020 10	SPAL	4–0	Pisa	Ferrara
CET (UTC+1)				Stadium: Stadio Paolo Mazza

8 December 2020 7	Pisa	2–1	Ascoli	Pisa
CET (UTC+1)				Stadium: Arena Garibaldi

12 December 2020 11	Pisa	1–0	Pordenone	Pisa
CET (UTC+1)				Stadium: Arena Garibaldi

15 December 2020 12	Pisa	0–0	Pescara	Pisa
CET (UTC+1)				Stadium: Arena Garibaldi

19 December 2020 13	Lecce	0–3	Pisa	Lecce
CET (UTC+1)				Stadium: Stadio Via del mare

22 December 2020 14	Pisa	2–2	Chievo	Pisa
CET (UTC+1)				Stadium: Arena Garibaldi

27 December 2020 15	Cosenza	1–1	Pisa	Cosenza
CET (UTC+1)				Stadium: Stadio San Vito-Gigi Marulla

4 January 2021 17	Venezia	1–1	Pisa	Venice
CET (UTC+1)				Stadium: Stadio Pier Luigi Penzo

16 January 2021 18	Pisa	1–0	Brescia	Pisa
CET (UTC+1)				Stadium: Arena Garibaldi

22 January 2021 19	Virtus Entella	2–1	Pisa	Chiavari
CET (UTC+1)				Stadium: Comunale Aldo Gastaldi

30 January 2021 20	Pisa	1–0	Reggiana	Pisa
CET (UTC+1)				Stadium: Arena Garibaldi

2 February 2021 16	Pisa	0–0	Frosinone	Pisa
CET (UTC+1)				Stadium: Arena Garibaldi

6 February 2021 21	Cremonese	2–1	Pisa	Cremona
CET (UTC+1)				Stadium: Stadio Giovanni Zini

9 February 2021 22	Pisa	2–2	Salernitana	Pisa
CET (UTC+1)				Stadium: Arena Garibaldi

12 February 2021 23	Monza	0–2	Pisa	Monza
CET (UTC+1)				Stadium: Stadio Brianteo

20 February 2021 24	Pisa	1–1	Empoli	Pisa
CET (UTC+1)				Stadium: Arena Garibaldi

27 February 2021 25	Pisa	2–2	Vicenza	Pisa
CET (UTC+1)				Stadium: Arena Garibaldi

2 March 2021 26	Ascoli	0–2	Pisa	Ascoli Piceno
CET (UTC+1)				Stadium: Stadio Cino e Lillo Del Duca

6 March 2021 27	Pisa	0–0	Reggina	Pisa
CET (UTC+1)				Stadium: Arena Garibaldi

12 March 2021 28	Cittadella	2–0	Pisa	Cittadella
CET (UTC+1)				Stadium: Stadio Pier Cesare Tombolato

15 March 2021 29	Pisa	3–0	SPAL	Pisa
CET (UTC+1)				Stadium: Arena Garibaldi

2 April 2021 31	Pescara	3–1	Pisa	Pescara
CEST (UTC+2)				Stadium: Stadio Adriatico – Giovanni Cornacchia

5 April 2021 32	Pisa	0–1	Lecce	Pisa
CEST (UTC+2)				Stadium: Arena Garibaldi

12 April 2021 33	Chievo	2–0	Pisa	Verona
CEST (UTC+2)				Stadium: Stadio Marcantonio Bentegodi

17 April 2021 34	Pisa	3–0	Cosenza	Pisa
CEST (UTC+2)				Stadium: Arena Garibaldi

24 April 2021 30	Pordenone	2–2	Pisa	Lignano Sabbiadoro
CEST (UTC+2)				Stadium: Stadio Guido Teghil

1 May 2021 35	Frosinone	3–1	Pisa	Frosinone
CEST (UTC+2)				Stadium: Stadio Benito Stirpe

4 May 2021 36	Pisa	2–2	Venezia	Pisa
CEST (UTC+2)				Stadium: Arena Garibaldi

7 May 2021 37	Brescia	4–3	Pisa	Brescia
14:00 CEST (UTC+2)				Stadium: Stadio Mario Rigamonti

10 May 2021 38	Pisa	3–2	Virtus Entella	Pisa
14:00 CEST (UTC+2)				Stadium: Arena Garibaldi

=== Coppa Italia ===
30 September 2020 Second round	Pisa	2–0	Juve Stabia	Pisa
15:00 CEST (UTC+2)	Sibilli 7', 50' (pen.)	Report		Stadium: Arena Garibaldi – Stadio Romeo Anconetani; Referee: Valerio Marini

27 October 2020 Third round	Virtus Entella	3–1	Pisa	Chiavari
15:00 CET (UTC+1)	Mancosu 36' (pen.); Sandri 69'; Cardoselli 79'	Report	Palombi 51'	Stadium: Stadio Comunale; Referee: Luca Massimi
