= Hjörtur Hermannsson =

Icelandic footballer (born 1995)

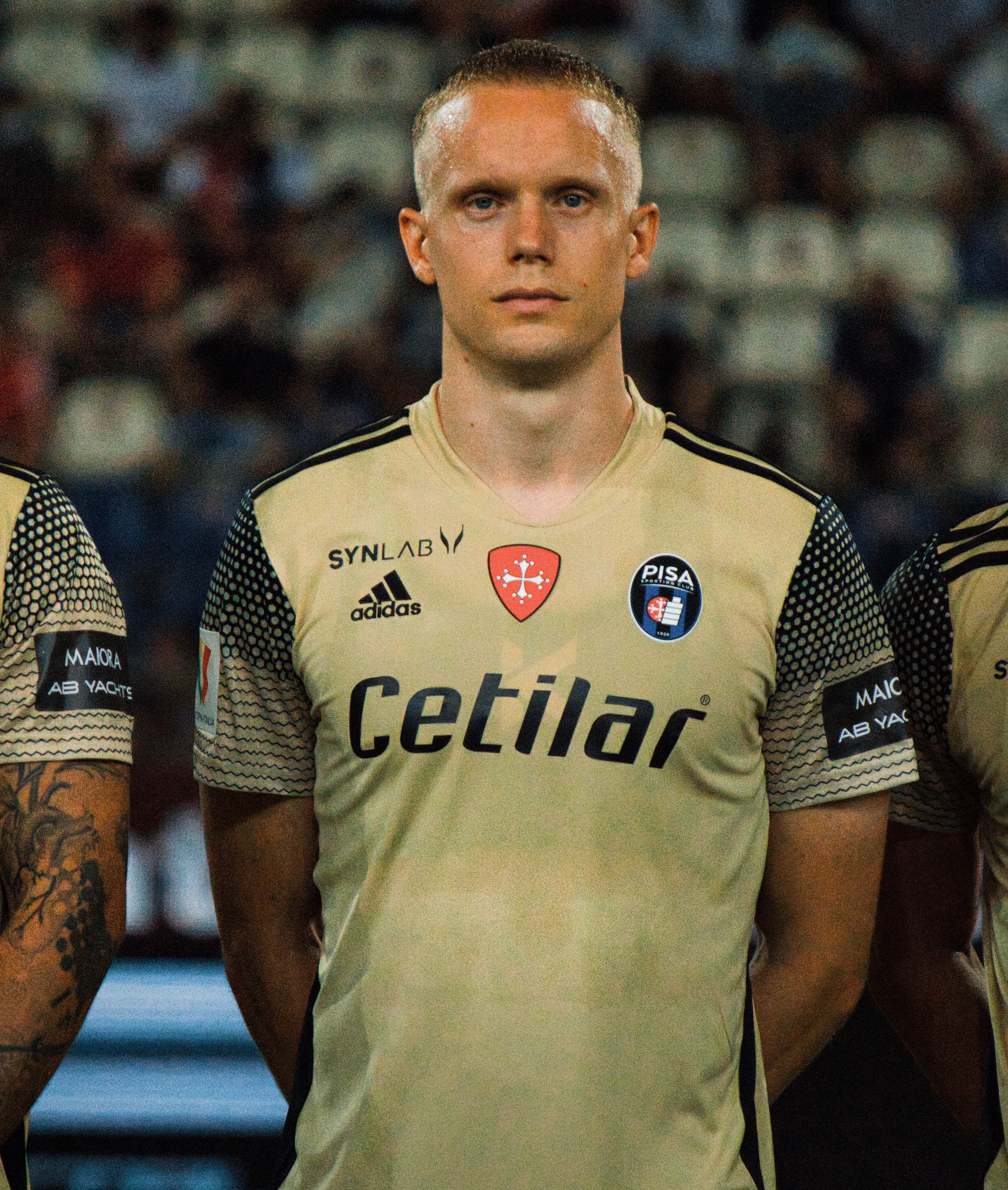
- Hjörtur on his debut with Pisa

Personal information
- Date of birth: 8 February 1995 (age 31)
- Place of birth: Reykjavík, Iceland
- Height: 1.90 m (6 ft 3 in)
- Position: Centre-back

Team information
- Current team: IFK Göteborg
- Number: 6

Youth career
- –2011: Fylkir
- 2012–2016: PSV

Senior career*
Years	Team	Apps	(Gls)
2011–2012	Fylkir	12	(1)
2013–2016	Jong PSV	59	(0)
2016	→ IFK Göteborg (loan)	7	(0)
2016–2021	Brøndby	124	(3)
2021–2024	Pisa	68	(0)
2024	Carrarese	3	(0)
2025–2026	Volos	46	(2)
2026–	IFK Göteborg	8	(1)

International career^{‡}
2010–2012	Iceland U17	23	(4)
2011–2013	Iceland U19	18	(4)
2013–2016	Iceland U21	18	(2)
2016–	Iceland	32	(0)
- * Club domestic league appearances and goals as of 18:58, 19 September 2026 (UTC) ‡ National team caps and goals as of 16 November 2026

Hjörtur Hermannsson (Icelandic pronunciation: [ˈhɛrmanˌsɔn]; born 8 February 1995) is an Icelandic professional footballer who plays as a centre-back for Allsvenskan club IFK Göteborg and the Iceland national team.

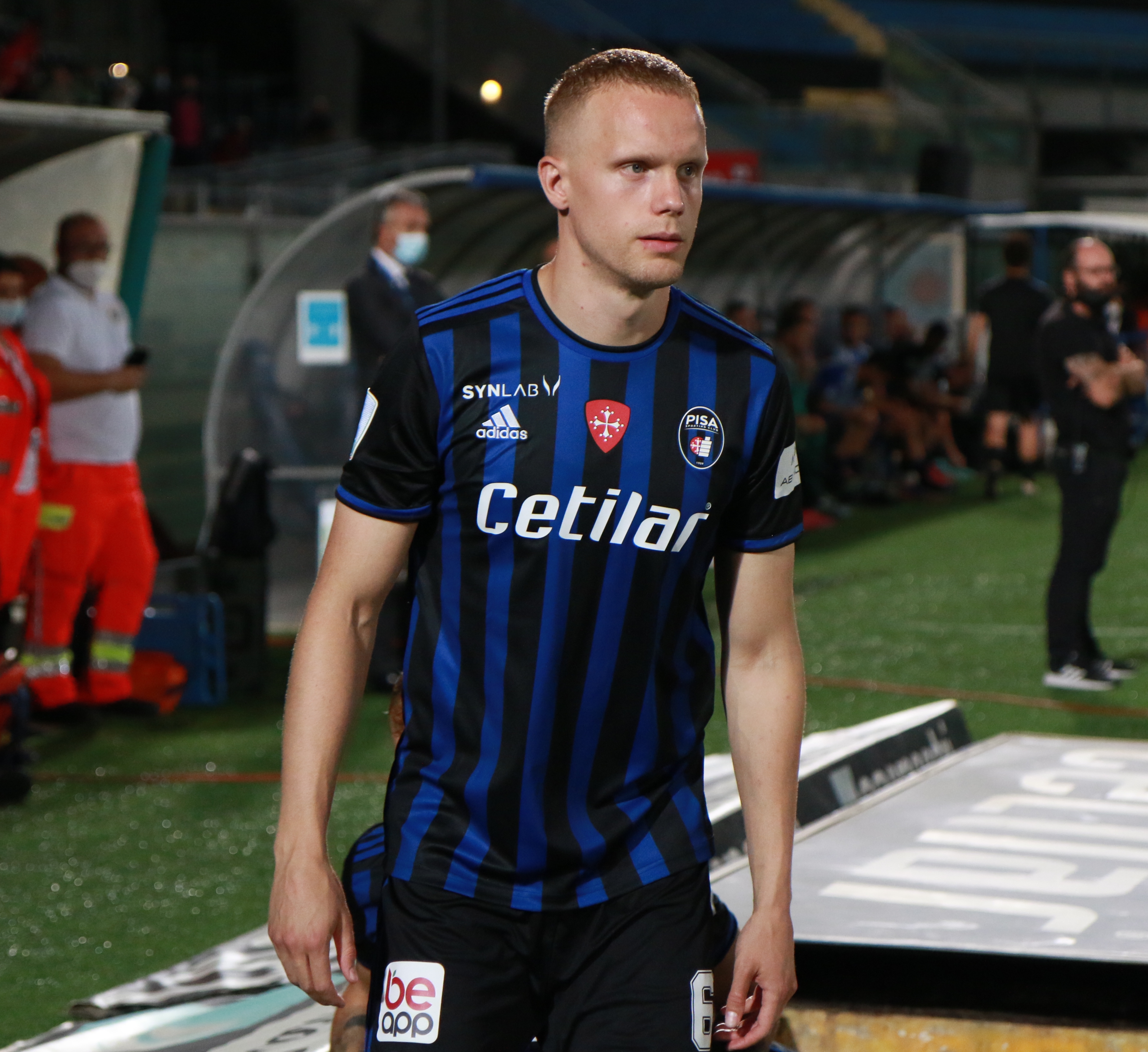
Hjörtur Hermannsson with Pisa jersey

== Club career ==
=== Fylkir ===
Born in Reykjavík, Iceland, Hjörtur began his career at Fylkir, based in the Icelandic top division. After going through the ranks for the side, Hjörtur was involved in the first team, where he appeared in the first two matches of the season as an unused substitute. Weeks later, on 6 June 2011, Hjörtur made his Fylkir debut, where he came on as a late substitute, in a 3–1 loss against Stjarnan. Soon after, Hjörtur became a first team regular and then scored his first goal for the club, as well as his first professional goal, in a 2–1 win over Víkingur. Hjörtur went on to make nine appearances in his first season for the side.

Despite moving to PSV Eindhoven in the summer, Hjörtur then made three appearances for the side, adding his tally 12 games for Fylkir, with his first appearance came on 15 May 2012 against ÍA, which saw them lose 1–0.

=== PSV ===
After the Úrvalsdeild season came to an end, Hjörtur then went on a trial at Eredivisie side PSV Eindhoven on 29 October 2011. After impressing at the trial, Hjörtur signed a three-year deal with PSV, where he will join the club on 1 July 2012.

After years of development at the academy, Hjörtur made his professional debut as Jong PSV player in the Eerste Divisie on 18 August 2013 against FC Oss in a 4–0 home win. He replaced Jorrit Hendrix after 61 minutes. He made 25 league appearances during the 2013–14 season after a knee injury ended his season. In the 2014–15 season, Hjörtur continued to remain in the Jong PSV starting eleven despite suffering setback of injuries, which restricted him to 16 appearances. During the season, Hjörtur was called up to the senior team ahead of the match against NAC Breda, but did not play, as PSV went on to win 2–0 on 3 February 2015.

Ahead of the 2015–16 season, Hjörtur signed a contract with the club, keeping him until 2018. During the first half of the season, Hjörtur made 16 appearances for the team. On 16 February 2016, it was announced that he was loaned out to the Allsvenskan club IFK Göteborg until the summer. However, at the start of the season, Hjörtur suffered a hip injury while on international duty and was sidelined for weeks. After recovering, he then returned from injury and made his Göteborg debut on 2 May 2016, where he made his first start, in a 6–2 win over Gefle. From that moment on, Hjörtur became a first-team regular for the side throughout May and June until his loan spell expired in the summer.

=== Brøndby ===
After his loan spell at Göteborg came to an end, Hjörtur joined Danish side Brøndby for €300,000 and viewed as the replacement for Daniel Agger, who retired at the end of the season. After missing out in the opening game of the season, Hjörtur made his Brøndby debut on 31 July 2016, where he made his first start and played the whole game, in a 2–2 draw against Horsens. Weeks later after making his debut, Hjörtur then scored his first goal for the club on 14 August 2016, in a 4–0 win over SønderjyskE. From that moment on, Hjörtur became a first-team regular for the club.

Hjörtur won the Danish Cup with Brøndby in the 2017–18 season, with the team also making a failed push for the Danish championship, losing a comfortable lead to FC Midtjylland in the final matches of the season. With the Danish side, he also took part in UEFA Europa League qualifiers, never making it to the group stage as they were knocked out to Panathinaikos (2016), Hajduk Split (2017), Genk (2018), Braga (2019).

In the 2019–20 season, Hjörtur was utilised as the right-side centre-back in the 3–5–2 formation of head coach Niels Frederiksen, alongside team captain Andreas Maxsø and Anthony Jung. He was part of a revitalised defense during the season, as Brøndby finished fourth in the league table. Hjörtur made 31 appearances during the season.

After five years in Brøndby, Hjörtur left the club at the end of the 2020–21 season.

=== Pisa ===
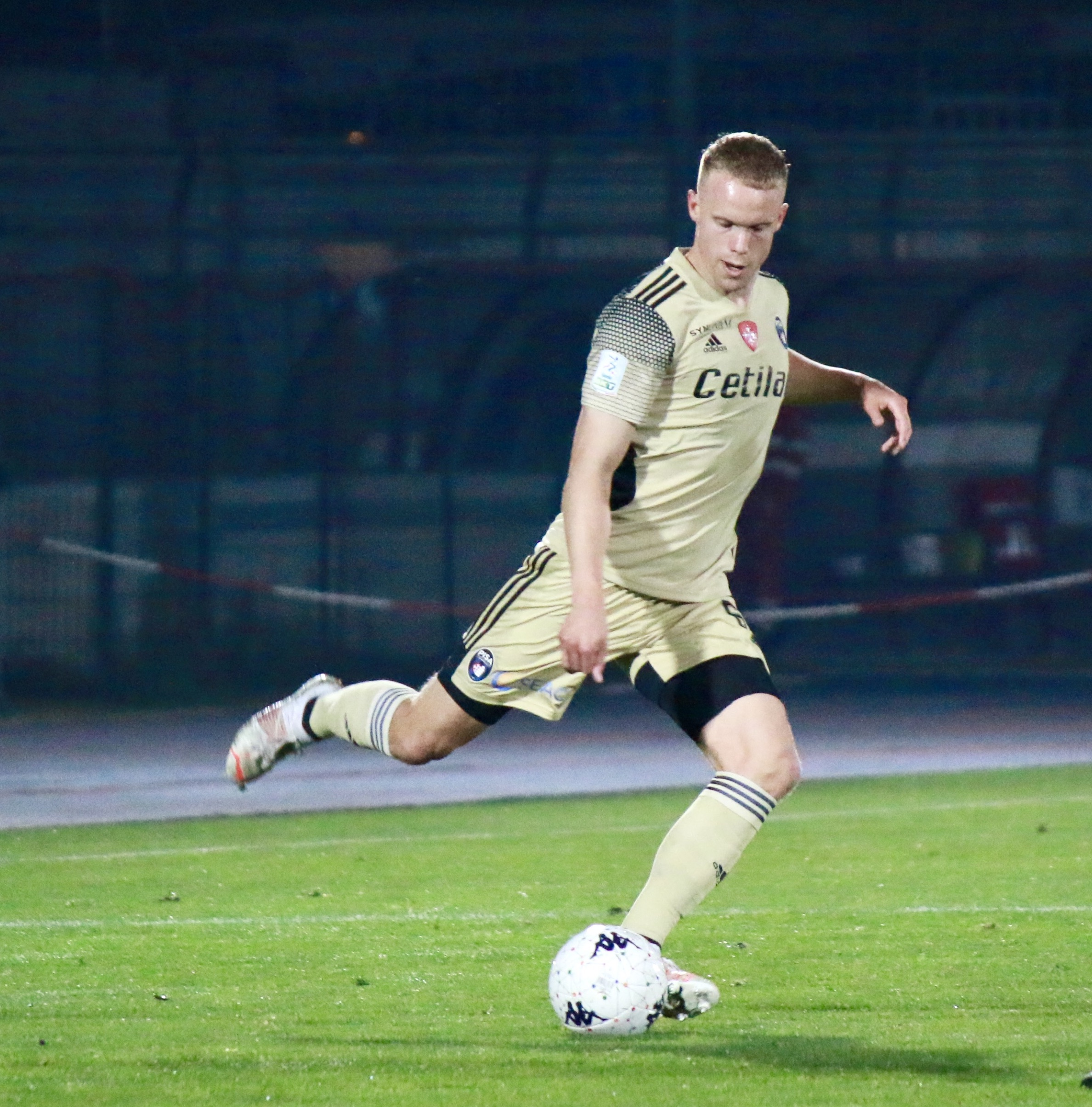
Hjortür Hermannson with Pisa golden jersey

On 16 July 2021, Hjörtur joined Italian club Pisa on a four-year contract. On 14 August, he made his debut for the club against Cagliari in a 3–1 loss in the Coppa Italia. He made his Serie B debut eight days later on 22 August 2021 in a 1–0 win over SPAL.

Hjörtur scored his first goal for Pisa on 29 May 2022 in the play-off finals for promotion to the Serie A against Monza off a cross from Pietro Beruatto. Two goals in extra time by Monza won them the encounter 4–3 (6–4 on aggregate), to earn promotion to the 2022–23 Serie A, with Hjörtur and Pisa missing out.

=== Carrarese ===
On 26 August 2024, Hjörtur signed a one-season deal with Carrarese in Serie B.

=== Volos ===
On 7 January 2025, Hjörtur moved to Volos in Greece.

== International career ==
While at the duty for Iceland U17 and Iceland U19 for the past three years, Hjörtur was named as one of the promising players by UEFA ahead of the UEFA European Under-17 Championship in Slovakia and scored once during the campaign against France U17. Following the end of the tournament, Hjörturwas named Team of the Tournament.

The following year, Hjörtur was called up by Iceland U21 for the first time and made his Iceland U21 debut on 6 February 2013, where he played the whole game despite losing 3–0 against Wales U21. It wasn't until on 5 March 2014 when Hjörtur scored his first Iceland U21 goal, in a 3–2 loss against Kazakhstan U21. A year later, Hjörtur scored again on 5 September 2015, in a 3–2 win over France U21. In October 2016, Hjörtur captained Iceland U21 for the first time, which saw them win 2–0 against Scotland U21.

Hjörtur got his first call up to the senior Iceland squad for friendlies against Poland and Slovakia in November 2015. It wasn't until on 31 January 2016 when he made his senior team debut, coming on as a substitute in the second half, in a 3–2 loss against United States. He was selected for UEFA Euro 2016. However, Hjörtur did not make any appearance for Iceland throughout the UEFA Euro 2016, as they reached the quarter-final and lost to France. Despite making no appearances, Hjörtur stated that being called up for the UEFA Euro 2016 was the best day of his life.

== Career statistics ==
=== Club ===
As of match played 28 September 2024

Appearances and goals by club, season and competition
Club	Season	League			National cup (Note: Includes Svenska Cupen, Danish Cup, Coppa Italia)		Europe		Other		Total	
Club	Season	Division	Apps	Goals	Apps	Goals	Apps	Goals	Apps	Goals	Apps	Goals
Fylkir	2011	Úrvalsdeild	9	1	0	0	—		—		9	1
Fylkir	2012	Úrvalsdeild	3	0	0	0	—		—		3	0
Fylkir	Total		12	1	0	0	—		—		12	1
Jong PSV	2013–14	Eerste Divisie	25	0	0	0	—		—		25	0
Jong PSV	2014–15	Eerste Divisie	18	0	0	0	—		—		18	0
Jong PSV	2015–16	Eerste Divisie	16	0	0	0	—		—		16	0
Jong PSV	Total		59	0	0	0	—		—		59	0
IFK Göteborg	2016	Allsvenskan	6	0	3	1	—		—		9	1
Brøndby	2016–17	Danish Superliga	32	1	4	0	2 (Note: Appearances in UEFA Europa League)	0	0	0	38	1
Brøndby	2017–18	Danish Superliga	23	1	5	0	4	1	—		32	2
Brøndby	2018–19	Danish Superliga	20	0	5	0	0	0	1 (Note: Appearances in Danish Superliga European play-offs)	0	26	0
Brøndby	2019–20	Danish Superliga	24	0	2	0	6	0	0	0	32	0
Brøndby	2020–21	Danish Superliga	25	1	1	0	—		—		26	1
Brøndby	Total		124	3	17	0	13	1	1	0	155	4
Pisa	2021–22	Serie B	29	0	1	0	—		3 (Note: Appearances in Serie B promotion play-offs)	1	30	1
Pisa	2022–23	Serie B	27	0	1	0	—		—		28	0
Pisa	2023–24	Serie B	15	0	1	0	—		—		10	0
Pisa	Total		71	0	3	0	—		3	1	68	1
Carrarese	2024–25	Serie B	3	0	0	0	—		—		3	0
Career total			275	4	23	1	13	1	4	1	306	7

=== International ===
Scores and results list Iceland's goal tally first, score column indicates score after each Hjörtur goal.

List of international goals scored by Hjörtur Hermannsson
No.	Date	Venue	Opponent	Score	Result	Competition
—	11 January 2018	Maguwoharjo Stadium, Sleman, Indonesia	Indonesia Selection	5–0	6–0	Unofficial friendly

== Honours ==
Brøndby

- Danish Superliga: 2020–21
- Danish Cup: 2017–18
