= Stefano Gori =

Italian footballer (born 1996)

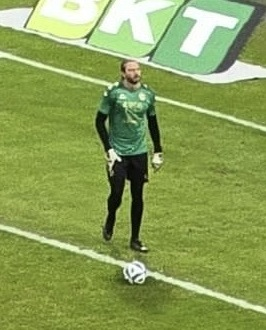
- Gori with Spezia in 2024

Personal information
- Date of birth: 9 March 1996 (age 30)
- Place of birth: Brescia, Italy
- Height: 1.90 m (6 ft 3 in)
- Position: Goalkeeper

Team information
- Current team: Union Brescia
- Number: 66

Youth career
- Voluntas Brescia
- –2014: Brescia
- 2014–2015: AC Milan

Senior career*
| Years | Team | Apps | (Gls) |
| 2013–2014 | Brescia | 0 | (0) |
| 2014–2015 | AC Milan | 0 | (0) |
| 2015–2018 | Bari | 1 | (0) |
| 2017–2018 | → Pro Piacenza (loan) | 36 | (0) |
| 2018–2020 | Pisa | 72 | (0) |
| 2020–2025 | Juventus | 0 | (0) |
| 2021 | → Pisa (loan) | 19 | (0) |
| 2021–2022 | → Como (loan) | 19 | (0) |
| 2022–2023 | → Perugia (loan) | 32 | (0) |
| 2023–2024 | → Monza (loan) | 0 | (0) |
| 2024–2025 | → Spezia (loan) | 23 | (0) |
| 2025– | Union Brescia | 38 | (0) |

International career
| 2014 | Italy U18 | 4 | (0) |
| 2014 | Italy U19 | 1 | (0) |
- * Club domestic league appearances and goals as of 29 April 2026

Stefano Gori (born 9 March 1996) is an Italian professional footballer who plays as a goalkeeper for Serie C Group A club Union Brescia.

== Club career ==
=== Brescia ===
Gori began playing football at youth level for his hometown club, Voluntas Brescia, who signed him to their youth sector. In 2013, after a derby in the Primavera (under-19) between Brescia and AC Milan, Gori impressed the Rossoneri observers and coach Filippo Inzaghi, who pressed to buy him.

=== AC Milan ===
In January 2014, Gori moved to Milan's Primavera team on a co-ownership deal. After winning the Torneo di Viareggio in the final against Anderlecht, he was redeemed by the Rossoneri in exchange for Lorenzo Andrenacci, becoming a key player of the team at the youth level. In the following season, Gori was regularly called up to Serie A, becoming the third-choice goalkeeper behind Christian Abbiati and Diego Lopez. He continued to grow with the Milan goalkeepers, while his place in the Primavera was left to Gianluigi Donnarumma.

=== Bari ===
On 28 August 2015, Gori signed a three-year contract with Bari, with whom he made his professional debut on 18 May 2017, in the 2–1 Serie B defeat against SPAL.

==== Loan to Pro Piacenza ====
On 8 July 2017, Gori was loaned to Pro Piacenza.

He made his debut on 30 July 2017, in the Coppa Italia Serie C against Vicenza, while his league debut took place against Giana Erminio. He made 37 appearances between the league and cups, establishing himself among the best goalkeepers in the group and helping his team avoid relegation with his performances and saved penalties. At the end of the season he returned to Bari.

=== Pisa ===
On 3 August 2018, Gori was signed by Pisa as a starting goalkeeper. He maintained a positive record with the team, with 18 clean sheets and saving five penalties. He helped his team win in the play-off final against Triestina to gain promotion to Serie B.

In the following season, in the 2019–20 Serie B season, Gori reconfirmed his good performances, so as to attract the interest of numerous clubs. Pisa finished the season beyond expectations, missing out on qualifying for the promotion play-offs only due to their head-to-head records with Empoli and Frosinone who all reached 54 points. Meanwhile, with the season extended into the summer period due to the first lockdown linked to the COVID-19 pandemic, on 28 June 2020 Juventus announced that they had purchased Gori on a permanent deal for over €3 million (with goalkeeper Leonardo Loria moving the other way).

=== Juventus ===
Gori began the 2020–21 season recovering from a shoulder injury, which keet him out of action for four months. Juventus loaned him out to Pisa in Serie B, and once again became a regular of the team. Pisa once again came close to the play-offs for promotion to Serie A with a great second half of the season.

==== Loans to Como, Perugia, Monza and Spezia ====
On 21 July 2021, having returned to Juventus from his loan at Pisa, Gori was loaned to Como in Serie B. He established himself among the best in the first half of the season, suffering an injury in December which forced him to miss some games, returning to the second part of the season.

On 13 July 2022, Gori was loaned to Perugia. He made his debut on August 5, in the Coppa Italia match against Cagliari. A week later, he his debut Serie B debut with Perugia against Palermo. He was among the best in the squad, despite the bad season at the collective level, with 11 clean sheets out of 32 games. On 30 June 2023, he returned to Juventus after his annual loan had expired.

On 31 July 2023, he moved on loan to Monza in Serie A.

On 30 August 2024, Gori was loaned by Spezia in Serie B.

=== Union Brescia ===
On 12 August 2025, Gori signed a three-season contract with Union Brescia in Serie C.

== International career ==
In 2014 Gori was called up by Italy U18, making his debut on 8 January against Tunisia in a 4–0 win. The same year he was promoted to the U19s, with whom he made his debut on 13 August against Croatia.

== Style of play ==
Gori is a complete goalkeeper who specializes in saving penalty kicks.

== Career statistics ==
=== Club ===
As of match played 1 June 2025

Appearances and goals by club, season and competition
| Club | Season | League | | | Coppa Italia | | Other | | Total | |
| Club | Season | Division | Apps | Goals | Apps | Goals | Apps | Goals | Apps | Goals |
|---|---|---|---|---|---|---|---|---|---|---|
| Bari | 2015–16 | Serie B | 0 | 0 | 0 | 0 | — | | 0 | 0 |
| Bari | 2016–17 | Serie B | 1 | 0 | 0 | 0 | — | | 1 | 0 |
| Bari | Total | | 1 | 0 | 0 | 0 | 0 | 0 | 1 | 0 |
| Pro Piacenza (loan) | 2017–18 | Serie C | 36 | 0 | 1 | 0 | 0 | 0 | 37 | 0 |
| Pisa | 2018–19 | Serie C | 36 | 0 | 1 | 0 | 7 (Note: Six appearances in Serie C promotion play-offs, one appearance in Coppa Italia Serie C) | 0 | 44 | 0 |
| Pisa | 2019–20 | Serie B | 36 | 0 | 2 | 0 | — | | 38 | 0 |
| Pisa | Total | | 72 | 0 | 3 | 0 | 7 | 0 | 82 | 0 |
| Juventus | 2020–21 | Serie A | 0 | 0 | — | | — | | 0 | 0 |
| Pisa (loan) | 2020–21 | Serie B | 19 | 0 | 0 | 0 | — | | 19 | 0 |
| Como (loan) | 2021–22 | Serie B | 19 | 0 | 1 | 0 | — | | 20 | 0 |
| Perugia (loan) | 2022–23 | Serie B | 32 | 0 | 1 | 0 | — | | 33 | 0 |
| Monza (loan) | 2023–24 | Serie A | 0 | 0 | 0 | 0 | — | | 0 | 0 |
| Spezia | 2024–25 | Serie B | 23 | 0 | 0 | 0 | 4 (Note: Four appearances in Serie B promotion play-offs) | 0 | 27 | 0 |
| Career total | | | 202 | 0 | 6 | 0 | 11 | 0 | 213 | 0 |
