= Marius Marin =

Romanian footballer (born 1998)

Personal information
- Full name: Marius Mihai Marin
- Date of birth: 30 August 1998 (age 28)
- Place of birth: Timișoara, Romania
- Height: 1.80 m (5 ft 11 in)
- Position: Midfielder

Team information
- Current team: Al-Nasr
- Number: 8

Youth career
- –2015: ACS Poli Timișoara
- 2015–2016: ASU Politehnica Timișoara
- 2016–2017: Sassuolo

Senior career*
Years	Team	Apps	(Gls)
2015	ACS Poli Timișoara	2	(0)
2015–2016	ASU Politehnica Timișoara		
2017–2019	Sassuolo	0	(0)
2017–2018	→ Catanzaro (loan)	28	(0)
2018–2019	→ Pisa (loan)	30	(0)
2019–2026	Pisa	220	(7)
2026–	Al-Nasr	6	(0)

International career^{‡}
2019–2021	Romania U21	9	(0)
2021	Romania Olympic	7	(0)
2021–	Romania	36	(0)
- * Club domestic league appearances and goals as of 8 November 2026 ‡ National team caps and goals as of 2 October 2026

Marius Mihai Marin (Romanian pronunciation: [ˈmari.us miˈhaj maˈrin]; born 30 August 1998) is a Romanian professional footballer who plays as a midfielder for UAE Pro League club Al-Nasr and the Romania national team.

Marin moved to Italy at age 18, when Sassuolo transferred him from his hometown side ASU Politehnica Timișoara. After three years under contract with the Neroverdi, during which he was loaned out to Catanzaro and Pisa, he decided to sign for the latter club on a permanent basis.

Internationally, Marin represented Romania at under-21 and under-23 levels, before making his full debut in a 2–0 win over Liechtenstein in September 2021. He was selected in the squad for UEFA Euro 2024, where they won their group and reached the round of 16.

== Club career ==
=== Early career ===
ACS Poli Timișoara head coach Dan Alexa gave Marin his senior debut on 23 May 2015, aged 16, in a 5–0 thrashing of Unirea Tărlungeni in the Liga II championship. The following season, Marin moved to ASU Politehnica Timișoara—the other club founded after the dissolution of the original FC Politehnica—and participated with it in the third league, which they went on win.

In late August 2016, Marin moved abroad to Sassuolo after training in Italy for one month. Upon turning 18, he signed a four-year contract and spent his first season with the Primavera side. For the 2017–18 campaign, he joined Catanzaro on loan in the Serie C.

=== Pisa ===
Marin was again loaned out by Sassuolo for the 2018–19 season, joining Pisa, with whom he achieved promotion to the Serie B. On 31 July 2019, he returned to the Arena Garibaldi on a permanent transfer.

Marin scored his first career goal on 3 July 2020, contributing to a 2–0 Serie B win over Cittadella. During early 2021, several Serie A teams reportedly monitored Marin, as well as two of the title contenders from his native country, namely CFR Cluj and FCSB. Nothing came of these rumours, and on 20 October 2021 he signed a contract extension with Pisa running until 2025.

On 28 August 2022, Marin made his 100th Serie B appearance and wore the captain armband in a 0–1 loss to Genoa. In October 2023, he played his 185th game for Pisa, becoming the foreign player with the most appearances in all competitions for the club.

Marin made his Serie A debut for Pisa on 24 August 2025, during his eighth consecutive season at the club, starting and playing 78 minutes in a 1–1 away draw against Atalanta.

== International career ==
=== Youth ===
Marin registered his debut for Romania under-21 on 10 October 2019, in a 3–0 win over Ukraine counting for the 2021 UEFA European Championship qualifiers; he received a red card just one minute after entering the field. Manager Adrian Mutu called up Marin for the final tournament hosted by Hungary and Slovenia, and he captained the side in the first two group games before missing the last one through a suspension. Romania failed to progress despite finishing with the same number of points as the Netherlands and Germany.

Marin was then named in the squad for the postponed 2020 Summer Olympics, where he continued to serve as captain and played all three matches in the eventual group-stage exit.

=== Senior ===
Marin made his full debut for Romania on 5 September 2021, coming on as a 63rd-minute substitute for Darius Olaru in a 2–0 World Cup qualifier defeat of Liechtenstein. He aided with seven appearances in the Euro 2024 qualifiers, including a start in the final 1–0 victory over Switzerland, which secured Romania first place in Group I.

On 7 June 2024, Marin was named in Romania's squad for Euro 2024. He started in all four matches of the tournament, forming a midfield partnership with Răzvan Marin and Nicolae Stanciu, as the nation won its group but was eliminated by the Netherlands in the round of 16.

== Personal life ==
Marin stated that his parents struggled financially to support his youth football practice, so he used the first money he earned in Italy to build a house for them.

== Career statistics ==
=== Club ===
As of match played 8 November 2026

Appearances and goals by club, season and competition
Club	Season	League			National cup (Note: Includes Coppa Italia and Coppa Italia Serie C)		Continental		Other		Total	
Club	Season	Division	Apps	Goals	Apps	Goals	Apps	Goals	Apps	Goals	Apps	Goals
ACS Poli Timișoara	2014–15	Liga II	2	0	0	0	—		—		2	0
ASU Politehnica Timișoara	2015–16	Liga III	?	?	?	?	—		—		?	?
Sassuolo	2016–17	Serie A	0	0	0	0	—		—		0	0
Catanzaro (loan)	2017–18	Serie C	28	0	2	0	—		—		30	0
Pisa (loan)	2018–19	Serie C	30	0	3	0	—		5 (Note: Appearances in Serie C promotion play-offs)	0	38	0
Pisa	2019–20	Serie B	29	1	1	0	—		—		30	1
Pisa	2020–21	Serie B	33	2	2	0	—		—		35	2
Pisa	2021–22	Serie B	35	0	1	0	—		4 (Note: Appearances in Serie B promotion play-offs)	0	40	0
Pisa	2022–23	Serie B	33	1	1	0	—		—		34	1
Pisa	2023–24	Serie B	33	2	1	0	—		—		34	2
Pisa	2024–25	Serie B	34	1	1	0	—		—		35	1
Pisa	2025–26	Serie A	23	0	1	0	—		—		24	0
Pisa	Total		250	7	11	0	0	0	9	0	270	7
Al-Nasr	2026–27	UAE Pro League	6	0	0	0	—		1 (Note: Appearance in UAE League Cup)	0	7	0
Career total			281	7	13	0	0	0	10	0	303	7

=== International ===
As of match played 2 October 2026

Appearances and goals by national team and year
National team	Year	Apps	Goals
Romania
Romania	2021	2	0
Romania	2022	6	0
Romania	2023	7	0
Romania	2024	13	0
Romania	2025	7	0
Romania	2026	1	0
Total		36	0

== Honours ==
ACS Poli Timișoara

- Liga II: 2014–15

ASU Politehnica Timișoara

- Liga III: 2015–16

Records

- Foreign player with the most appearances for Pisa in all competitions: 270
