= Ádám Nagy =

Hungarian footballer

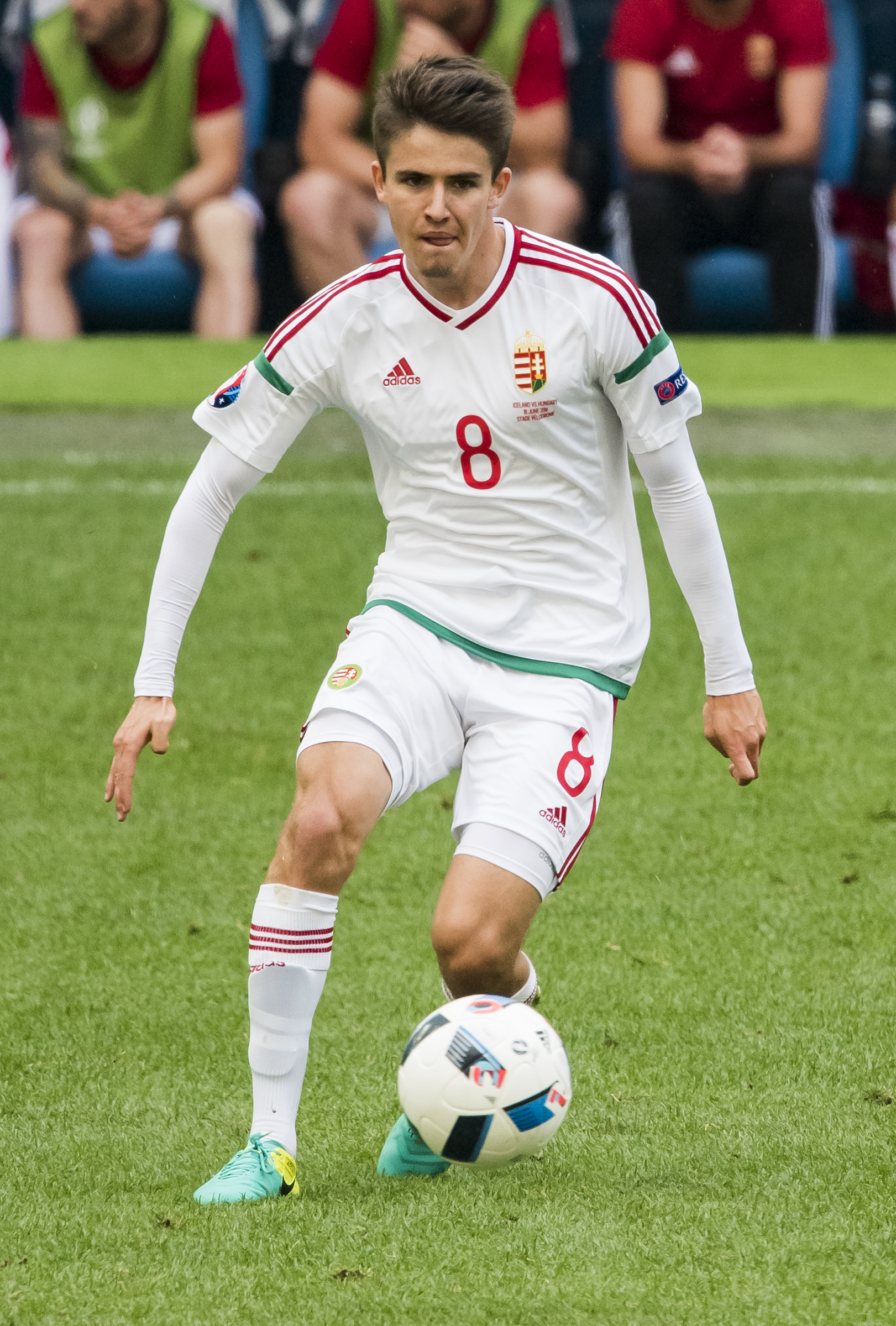
- Nagy playing for Hungary at UEFA Euro 2016

Personal information
- Full name: Ádám Nagy
- Date of birth: 17 June 1995 (age 31)
- Place of birth: Budapest, Hungary
- Height: 1.78 m (5 ft 10 in)
- Position: Defensive midfielder

Team information
- Current team: Ferencváros
- Number: 6

Youth career
- 2003–2005: Goldball '94
- 2005–2007: Vasas
- 2008: Aramis SE
- 2009: Kelen SC
- 2009–2010: Tabáni Spartacus
- 2010–2011: Szent István SE
- 2012–2013: VSI Rio Maior
- 2013: Ferencváros

Senior career*
Years	Team	Apps	(Gls)
2013–2014	Ferencváros II	26	(1)
2014–2016	Ferencváros	26	(0)
2015	→ Budafok (loan)	1	(0)
2016–2019	Bologna	51	(1)
2019–2021	Bristol City	54	(3)
2021–2024	Pisa	83	(0)
2024	→ Spezia (loan)	16	(0)
2024–2026	Spezia	55	(0)
2026–	Ferencváros	0	(0)

International career^{‡}
2015	Hungary U20	7	(1)
2015	Hungary U21	1	(0)
2015–	Hungary	88	(2)
- * Club domestic league appearances and goals as of 13 May 2026 ‡ National team caps and goals as of 23:49, 16 November 2024 (UTC)

Ádám Nagy (Hungarian pronunciation: [ˈaːdaːm ˈnɒɟ]; born 17 June 1995) is a Hungarian professional footballer who plays as a midfielder for Nemzeti Bajnokság I club Ferencváros and the Hungary national team.

He began his career at Ferencváros, making his professional debut for the reserves in August 2013 and for the first team in May 2015. Nagy won eight caps and scored one goal for Hungary at youth level. He made his full international debut against Northern Ireland on 7 September 2015 coming on as a substitute, and has represented the nation at the 2016, 2020 and 2024 UEFA European Championships.

== Club career ==
=== Early years ===
Nagy was born in Budapest, Hungary. After starting his career at Goldball '94 FC, he played for Tabáni Spartacus SKE and Szent István SE. In 2008, he had a brief spell at the futsal club Aramis Sport Egyesület.

At the age of 16, he went to La Manga Club to join the football academy created by English football development academy VisionPro Sports Institute. In January 2012, the academy moved to Portugal forming the VSI Rio Maior Football Club, and established themselves in the lower levels of the Santarém Football Association Juniors Championship. The project was led by former Premier League players such as Ian Wright and Mark Hughes. The academy was coached by English coach Paul Simpson and the team was composed of young players, between the ages of 16 and 19, from Portugal, Hungary, Angola, Wales, England, Congo and Spain. The project ended in March 2013, due to mis-management of funds by the VSI Chairman and directors.

=== Ferencváros ===
On 13 August 2013, Nagy signed with Ferencváros. He made his professional debut in the 2013–14 campaign, with the II-team in the third division. He made his first appearance in the competition on 24 August 2013, playing in the 0–2 home loss against Felsőtárkány. On 30 August 2015 he scored his first goal in their 7–0 win at Ebes.

On 12 May 2015, Nagy made his debut for made his official debut for Ferencváros, playing in a 3–0 home win against Honvéd in the 2014–15 Ligakupa. Four days later, he played his first match in the Nemzeti Bajnokság against Paksi FC. The match ended with a 1–0 victory for the Budapest team. Nagy entered the pitch in the 46th minute as a substitute for Ugrai. On 20 May 2015, Nagy helped his team win the 2015 Magyar Kupa Final by playing 70 minutes in the final.

On 2 April 2016, Nagy became Hungarian League champion with Ferencváros after losing to Debrecen 2–1 at the Nagyerdei Stadion in the 2015–16 Nemzeti Bajnokság I season.

On 10 June 2016, Nagy was listed among the top 10 young talents at the Euro 2016. The list was created by Sports Illustrated and includes football players such as Kingsley Coman, Julian Draxler, and Raphaël Guerreiro.

During the European Championship, Nagy attracted attention from clubs such as Benfica, Olympique de Marseille and Leicester City.

=== Bologna ===
On 14 July 2016, Nagy joined Italian side Bologna after an impressive performance with the national team at the UEFA Euro 2016. In December 2016 he was voted Bologna's Player of the Month for December. In a friendly before the 2017–18 Serie A season, Nagy scored the 8th goal for Bologna.

In April of the 2017–18 Serie A season, he was voted as the third best player, preceded by Simone Verdi and Andrea Poli in the team by the voters of the official website of Bologna FC. However, the 2017–18 season was not as successful as the previous season for Nagy since he made only 12 appearances throughout the season. On 15 April 2018, he scored his first Serie A goal for Bologna against Hellas Verona F.C. in 94th minute at the Stadio Renato Dall'Ara, Bologna.

In the 2018–19 Serie A season Nagy made only 14 appearances among which 10 times he was in the starting line-up during the coaching of Filippo Inzaghi and Siniša Mihajlović, and during the summer of 2019 he repeatedly iterated that he would like to leave Bologna.

=== Bristol City ===
On 8 August 2019, Nagy joined Championship side Bristol City on a three-year deal with the option for a fourth year. On 10 August 2019, he debuted in the 2019–20 EFL Championship against Birmingham City at St Andrew's and scored his first goal against QPR in the next game.

=== Pisa ===
On 27 August 2021, Nagy signed a four-year contract with Serie B club Pisa.

=== Spezia ===
On 31 January 2024, Nagy joined fellow Serie B club Spezia on loan for the remainder of the season. On 14 June 2024, Spezia exercised the option to buy and signed a three-year contract with Nagy.

=== Ferencváros ===
On 31 July 2026, he was signed by Ferencváros.

== International career ==
=== Early international career ===
Having represented Hungary U-20 team at the 2015 FIFA U-20 World Cup, Nagy debuted for the Hungarian senior squad in a 1–1 draw against Northern Ireland in a UEFA Euro 2016 qualifying Group F match at Windsor Park on 7 September 2015.

In May 2016, Nagy was selected in Hungary's squad for UEFA Euro 2016 in France. He played the full 90 minutes of the team's first UEFA Euro 2016 Group F match on 15 June, as they beat Austria 2–0 in Bordeaux. Three days later, Nagy played in a 1–1 draw against Iceland at the Stade Vélodrome, Marseille.

On 18 November 2018, Nagy scored his first goal for the national team against Finland at the Groupama Aréna, Budapest, in a 2018–19 UEFA Nations League C match.

=== UEFA Euro 2020 onwards ===
On 1 June 2021, Nagy was included in the final 26-man squad to represent Hungary at the rescheduled UEFA Euro 2020 tournament. He started all three matches as the Magyars finished bottom of Group F, losing to Portugal and drawing with France and Germany.

On 19 November 2023, Nagy scored the third goal in a 3–1 victory over Montenegro in the last match of the UEFA Euro 2024 qualifying at the Puskás Aréna.

On 14 May 2024, Nagy was named in Hungary's squad for UEFA Euro 2024. He started against both Switzerland and Germany in the team's first two matches, before appearing as a substitute for Callum Styles in the 1–0 victory against Scotland during final Group A match. His appearance against Switzerland equalled former captain Ádám Szalai's record of seven UEFA European Championship matches. He later became the nation's outright record holder with his eighth cap against Germany.

== Career statistics ==
=== Club ===
As of match played 30 August 2025

Appearances and goals by club, season and competition
Club	Season	League			National Cup		League Cup		Other		Total	
Club	Season	Division	Apps	Goals	Apps	Goals	Apps	Goals	Apps	Goals	Apps	Goals
Ferencváros II	2013–14	NB III	26	1	—		—		—		26	1
Ferencváros	2014–15	NB I	1	0	1	0	5	0	0	0	7	0
Ferencváros	2015–16	NB I	25	0	4	0	0	0	1 (Note: Appearance in Szuperkupa)	0	30	0
Ferencváros	2026–27	NB I	0	0	0	0	—		0	0	0	0
Ferencváros	Total		26	0	5	0	5	0	1	0	37	0
Bologna	2016–17	Serie A	25	0	3	0	—		—		28	0
Bologna	2017–18	Serie A	12	1	1	0	—		—		13	1
Bologna	2018–19	Serie A	14	0	2	0	—		—		16	0
Bologna	Total		51	1	6	0	—		—		57	1
Bristol City	2019–20	Championship	23	1	2	0	1	0	—		26	1
Bristol City	2020–21	Championship	31	2	2	0	3	0	—		36	2
Bristol City	Total		54	3	4	0	4	0	—		62	3
Pisa	2021–22	Serie B	38	0	0	0	—		—		38	0
Pisa	2022–23	Serie B	34	0	1	0	—		—		35	0
Pisa	2023–24	Serie B	11	0	1	0	—		—		12	0
Pisa	Total		83	0	2	0	—		—		85	0
Spezia (loan)	2023–24	Serie B	16	0	—		—		—		16	0
Spezia	2024–25	Serie B	30	0	1	0	—		—		31	0
Spezia	2025–26	Serie B	2	0	1	0	—		—		3	0
Spezia	Total		32	0	2	0	—		—		34	0
Career total			288	5	21	0	9	0	2	0	320	5

=== International ===
As of match played 16 November 2024

Appearances and goals by national team and year
National team	Year	Apps	Goals
Hungary	2015	5	0
Hungary	2016	10	0
Hungary	2017	8	0
Hungary	2018	6	1
Hungary	2019	7	0
Hungary	2020	8	0
Hungary	2021	13	0
Hungary	2022	10	0
Hungary	2023	8	1
Hungary	2024	11	0
Total		88	2

As of match played 19 November 2023
Scores and results list Hungary's goal tally first, score column indicates score after each Nagy goal.

List of international goals scored by Ádám Nagy
No.	Date	Venue	Cap	Opponent	Score	Result	Competition
1	18 November 2018	Groupama Arena, Budapest, Hungary	29	Finland	2–0	2–0	2018–19 UEFA Nations League C
2	19 November 2023	Puskás Aréna, Budapest, Hungary	77	Montenegro	3–1	3–1	UEFA Euro 2024 qualifying

== Honours ==
Ferencváros

- Nemzeti Bajnokság I: 2015–16
- Hungarian Cup: 2014–15, 2015–16
- Hungarian League Cup: 2014–15
- Szuperkupa: 2015

Individual

- Nemzeti Sport Team of the Season: 2015–16
