= Samuele Birindelli =

Italian footballer (born 1999)

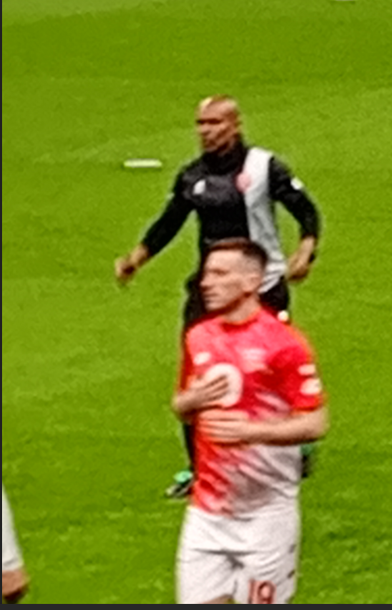

Personal information
- Date of birth: 19 July 1999 (age 27)
- Place of birth: Pisa, Italy
- Height: 1.75 m (5 ft 9 in)
- Position: Right-back

Team information
- Current team: Monza
- Number: 19

Youth career
- Pisa

Senior career*
Years	Team	Apps	(Gls)
2016–2022	Pisa	167	(7)
2022–	Monza	120	(8)

International career^{‡}
2017	Italy U18	2	(0)
2020	Italy U21	1	(0)
- * Club domestic league appearances and goals as of 12 May 2026 ‡ National team caps and goals as of 13 October 2020

Samuele Birindelli (born 19 July 1999) is an Italian professional footballer who plays as a right-back for Serie A club Monza.

== Club career ==
Coming through the youth system, Birindelli made his professional debut for Pisa in the Coppa Italia, the Italian national cup, on 29 November 2016, in a game against Torino.

On 7 July 2022, Birindelli signed for newly-promoted Serie A side Monza on a four-year contract. He made his debut on 8 August, in a 3–2 Coppa Italia win against Frosinone. Birindelli's first Serie A game came on 13 August, as a starter in a 2–1 home defeat to Torino.

== International career ==
On 13 October 2020, Birindelli made his debut with Italy U21 as a starter in a qualifying match for the 2021 UEFA European Under-21 Championship won 2–0 against the Republic of Ireland in Pisa, Italy.

== Personal life ==
Samuele is the son of former footballer Alessandro Birindelli.

== Career statistics ==
=== Club ===
As of match played 7 March 2026

Appearances and goals by club, season and competition
Club	Season	League			Coppa Italia		Other		Total	
Club	Season	Division	Apps	Goals	Apps	Goals	Apps	Goals	Apps	Goals
Pisa	2016–17	Serie B	7	0	1	0	—		8	0
Pisa	2017–18	Serie C	30	0	1	0	2 (Note: Appearances in play-offs)	0	33	0
Pisa	2018–19	Serie C	31	2	4	0	9 (Note: Six appearances in play-offs, three appearances in Coppa Italia Serie C)	0	44	2
Pisa	2019–20	Serie B	28	2	1	0	—		29	2
Pisa	2020–21	Serie B	35	2	2	0	—		37	2
Pisa	2021–22	Serie B	36	1	1	0	4	0	41	1
Pisa	Total		167	7	10	0	15	0	192	7
Monza	2022–23	Serie A	31	0	2	0	—		33	0
Monza	2023–24	Serie A	35	0	0	0	—		35	0
Monza	2024–25	Serie A	21	3	2	0	—		23	3
Monza	2025–26	Serie B	28	4	1	0	—		17	4
Monza	Total		115	7	5	0	0	0	120	7
Career total			270	14	15	0	15	0	312	14
