= Tommaso Fischer =

Italian footballer

Personal information
- Date of birth: 11 May 2003 (age 23)
- Place of birth: Pontedera, Italy
- Height: 1.82 m (6 ft 0 in)
- Position: Right-back

Team information
- Current team: Mobilieri Ponsacco
- Number: 26

Youth career
- –2019: Pisa

Senior career*
Years	Team	Apps	(Gls)
2019–2022	Pisa	1	(0)
2022–2023	Sanremese	0	(0)
2023–	Mobilieri Ponsacco	7	(0)
- * Club domestic league appearances and goals as of 20 December 2023

Tommaso Fischer (born 11 May 2003) is an Italian professional footballer who plays as a right-back for Serie D club Mobilieri Ponsacco.

== Club career ==
Tommaso Fischer made his professional debut for Pisa SC on the 4 May 2019, coming on as a substitute in the 3–0 home Serie C win against Novara. Still aged only 15, he became the youngest ever footballer to play for the Nerazzurri.

On 22 July 2022, Fischer moved to Sanremese in Serie D.
