= 2024–25 Carrarese Calcio 1908 season =

Carrarese Calcio 1908
2024–25 season
- Manager: Antonio Calabro
- Stadium: Stadio dei Marmi
- Serie B: Pre-season
- Coppa Italia: Pre-season

The 2024–25 season is the 97th season in the history of the Carrarese Calcio 1908, and the club's first season in the Serie B since 1948. In addition to the domestic league, the team is scheduled to participate in the Coppa Italia.

== Squad ==
Position	Number	Player	Date joined	Further data
GK		(Italy) Marco Bleve	2023	
MF		(Italy) Leonardo Capezzi	2023	
MF		(Italy) Simone Della Latta	2022	
FW		(Italy) Mattia Finotto	2023	
FW		(Italy) Leonardo Cerri	2024	

== Transfers ==
=== In ===
Pos.	Player	Transferred from	Fee	Date	Source
FW	(Italy) Leonardo Cerri	(Italy) Juventus Next Gen	Loan	1 August 2024	

=== Out ===
Pos.	Player	Transferred to	Fee	Date	Source
FW	(Italy) Leonardo Morosini	(Italy) Novara	Released	1 July 2024	
DF	(Italy) Matteo Di Gennaro	(Italy) Catania FC	Undisclosed	12 July 2024	
DF	(Italy) Davide Grassini	(Italy) Lecco	Undisclosed	3 January 2025	

== Friendlies ==
=== Pre-season ===
28 July 2024 Friendly	Virtus Entella (Italy)	0–0	(Italy) Carrarese	Tavarone
18:00

== Competitions ==
=== Overall record ===
Competition	First match	Last match	Starting round	Final position	Record							
Competition	First match	Last match	Starting round	Final position	Pld	W	D	L	GF	GA	GD	Win %
Serie B	18 August 2024	9 May 2025	Matchday 1		36	11	11	14	37	46	−9	30.56
Coppa Italia	3 August 2024	12 August 2024		Round of 32	2	1	0	1	3	4	−1	50.00
Total					38	12	11	15	40	50	−10	31.58

Source: Soccerway

=== Serie B ===
==== League table ====
Pos	Team	Pld	W	D	L	GF	GA	GD	Pts
10	Südtirol	38	12	10	16	50	57	−7	46
11	Modena	38	10	15	13	48	50	−2	45
12	Carrarese	38	11	12	15	39	49	−10	45
13	Mantova	38	10	14	14	49	58	−9	44
14	Reggiana	38	11	11	16	42	52	−10	44

Source: Serie BKT
Rules for classification: 1) Points; 2) Head-to-head points; 3) Head-to-head goal difference; 4) Goal difference; 5) Goals scored; 6) Draw.
(Note: Head-to-head record is used only after all the matches between the teams in question have been played)

==== Results summary ====
Overall								Home						Away					
Pld	W	D	L	GF	GA	GD	Pts	W	D	L	GF	GA	GD	W	D	L	GF	GA	GD
36	11	11	14	37	46	−9	44	10	5	4	24	18	+6	1	6	10	13	28	−15

==== Results by round ====
Round	1
Ground	A
Result	
Position	

A = Away; H = Home; W = Win; D = Draw; L = Loss

==== Matches ====
The match schedule was released on 10 July 2024.

18 August 2024 1	Cesena	2–1	Carrarese	Carrara
20:30				Stadium: Stadio Dino Manuzzi

24 August 2024 2	Cremonese	1–0	Carrarese

27 August 2024 3	Carrarese	2–0	Südtirol

1 September 2024 4	Catanzaro	3–1	Carrarese

15 September 2024 5	Carrarese	0–2	Sassuolo

22 September 2024 6	Spezia	4–2	Carrarese

28 September 2024 7	Carrarese	0–0	Reggiana

5 October 2024 8	Frosinone	0–1	Carrarese

20 October 2024 9	Carrarese	1–1	Mantova

26 October 2024 10	Carrarese	3–0	Cittadella

29 October 2024 11	Bari	0–0	Carrarese

2 November 2024 12	Carrarese	0–0	Juve Stabia

9 November 2024 13	Modena	2–0	Carrarese

23 November 2024 14	Carrarese	1–0	Pisa

1 December 2024 15	Salernitana	4–1	Carrarese

7 December 2024 16	Carrarese	1–0	Palermo

15 December 2024 17	Brescia	0–0	Carrarese

21 December 2024 18	Carrarese	1–0	Cosenza

26 December 2024 19	Sampdoria	1–1	Carrarese

29 December 2024 20	Carrarese	2–0	Cesena

13 January 2025 21	Pisa	2–1	Carrarese

19 January 2025 22	Carrarese	0–4	Spezia

25 January 2025 23	Juve Stabia	2–1	Carrarese

2 February 2025 24	Carrarese	1–2	Brescia

8 February 2025 25	Cosenza	1–0	Carrarese

15 February 2025 26	Carrarese	3–2	Salernitana

22 February 2025 27	Reggiana	2–2	Carrarese

1 March 2025 28	Carrarese	2–2	Cremonese

8 March 2025 29	Carrarese	0–1	Frosinone

16 March 2025 30	Südtirol	2–2	Carrarese

30 March 2025 31	Carrarese	2–1	Bari

5 April 2025 32	Cittadella	0–0	Carrarese

12 April 2025 33	Carrarese	2–2	Catanzaro

25 April 2025 35	Carrarese	1–0	Sampdoria

1 May 2025 36	Sassuolo	2–0	Carrarese

4 May 2025 37	Carrarese	2–1	Modena	Carrara

9 May 2025 38	Mantova	2–1	Carrarese	Mantua
20:30

13 May 2025 34	Palermo	1–1	Carrarese	Palermo
20:30

=== Coppa Italia ===
3 August 2024 Round of 64	Carrarese	2–1	Catania	Carrara
18:00				Stadium: Stadio dei Marmi

12 August 2024 Round of 32	Cagliari	3–1	Carrarese	Cagliari
21:15				Stadium: Unipol Domus
