= Alessandro Lovisa =

Italian footballer (born 2001)

Personal information
- Date of birth: 22 August 2001 (age 25)
- Place of birth: San Vito al Tagliamento, Italy
- Height: 1.88 m (6 ft 2 in)
- Position: Defensive midfielder

Youth career
- –2018: Pordenone
- 2018–2019: Napoli
- 2019–2020: Fiorentina

Senior career*
Years	Team	Apps	(Gls)
2018	Pordenone	1	(0)
2020–2022	Fiorentina	0	(0)
2020–2021	→ Gubbio (loan)	3	(0)
2021	→ Legnago (loan)	13	(1)
2021–2022	→ Lucchese (loan)	1	(0)
2022	→ Pordenone (loan)	17	(1)
2022–2023	Triestina	9	(0)
- * Club domestic league appearances and goals as of 22 April 2023

Alessandro Lovisa (born 22 August 2001) is an Italian football player.

== Club career ==
He was raised in the youth teams of Pordenone and made his professional debut in Serie C for the club on 31 March 2018 against Padova, at the age of 16.

On 17 August 2018, he moved to Napoli and signed a three-year contract. After spending the 2018–19 season with Napoli's Under-19 squad (including the 2018–19 UEFA Youth League), he returned to Pordenone.

On 5 August 2019, he left Pordenone again, signing a three-year contract with Fiorentina. After spending the 2019–20 season with Fiorentina's Under-19 squad, he then went on series of loans to Serie C clubs, joining Gubbio, Legnago and Lucchese, but failing to establish himself as a starting player in any of those loans.

On 12 January 2022, he returned to Pordenone on loan from Fiorentina. He made his Serie B debut for Pordenone on 16 January in a game against Lecce and made his first start in the next game on 22 January 2022 against Perugia.

On 20 July 2022, Lovisa signed a three-year deal with Triestina. His contract was terminated by mutual consent on 24 August 2023.

== Personal life ==
He is the son of the president of Pordenone, Mauro Lovisa.
