= Elia Giani =

Italian footballer (born 2000)

Personal information
- Date of birth: 20 December 2000 (age 25)
- Place of birth: Empoli, Italy
- Height: 1.85 m (6 ft 1 in)
- Position: Forward

Team information
- Current team: Pisa
- Number: 73

Youth career
- –2018: Pisa
- 2017–2018: → Ponsacco (loan)
- 2018–2019: Sassuolo
- 2019–2020: Pisa

Senior career*
Years	Team	Apps	(Gls)
2017–2018	Ponsacco	19	(6)
2019–	Pisa	1	(0)
2021	→ Pontedera (loan)	3	(1)
2021–2022	→ Fiorenzuola (loan)	19	(2)
2022–2023	→ Fiorenzuola (loan)	29	(0)
2023–2024	→ Legnago (loan)	34	(7)
2024–2025	→ Athens Kallithea (loan)	23	(4)
2025–2026	→ Union Brescia (loan)	9	(0)
2026	→ Carpi (loan)	8	(0)
- * Club domestic league appearances and goals as of 30 April 2026

Elia Giani (born 20 December 2000) is an Italian footballer who plays as a forward for Serie B club Pisa.

== Club career ==
He was raised in the youth teams of Pisa and began receiving call-ups to the senior squad late in the 2016–17 Serie B season, but did not see time on the field. He spent most of the 2017–18 season on loan to Serie D club Ponsacco.

In August 2018, he moved to the Under-19 squad of Sassuolo.

On 31 July 2019, he returned to Pisa.

He made his Serie B debut for Pisa on 8 December 2019 in a game against Virtus Entella. He substituted Marius Marin in the 81st minute.

On 16 January 2021, he was loaned to Serie C club Pontedera.

On 27 July 2021, he was loaned again to Fiorenzuola in the Serie C. On 20 August 2022, Giani returned to Fiorenzuola on a new loan. On 23 July 2023, he moved on a new loan to Legnago.

On 9 August 2024, Giani joined Greek side Athens Kallithea FC on a season-long loan.

On 1 September 2025, Giani was loaned by Serie C club Union Brescia, with an option to buy. On 27 January 2026, he moved on a new loan to Carpi.
