= Davide Di Quinzio =

Italian footballer (born 1989)

Personal information
- Date of birth: 28 April 1989 (age 37)
- Place of birth: Garbagnate Milanese, Italy
- Height: 1.78 m (5 ft 10 in)
- Position: Midfielder

Team information
- Current team: Caronnese

Youth career
- –2007: Inter

Senior career*
Years	Team	Apps	(Gls)
2007–2009	Pro Sesto	5	(1)
2009–2014	AlbinoLeffe	0	(0)
2009–2010	→ Pro Sesto (loan)	24	(1)
2010–2011	→ Montichiari (loan)	31	(0)
2011–2013	→ Cuneo (loan)	56	(4)
2013–2014	→ SPAL (loan)	11	(1)
2014–2016	SPAL	56	(4)
2016–2017	Como	36	(7)
2017–2020	Pisa	75	(8)
2020–2021	Alessandria	34	(1)
2021–2025	Pisa	6	(0)
2022–2023	→ Lucchese (loan)	21	(2)
2023–2024	→ Fiorenzuola (loan)	17	(0)
2025–2026	Pavia	4	(0)
2026–	Caronnese		
- * Club domestic league appearances and goals as of 9 November 2025

Davide Di Quinzio (born 28 April 1989) is an Italian footballer who plays as a midfielder for Eccellenza club Caronnese.

== Club career ==
He made his professional Lega Pro Prima Divisione debut for Pro Sesto in the 2008–09 season. He remained in the third-tier Serie C for the first 12 seasons of his senior career.

For the 2019–20 season his club Pisa advanced to the second-tier Serie B.

He made his Serie B debut for Pisa on 24 September 2019 in a game against Empoli. He started the game and was substituted after 65 minutes.

On 15 January 2020, he signed a 2.5-year contract with Serie C club Alessandria.

On 5 August 2021 he returned to Pisa.

On 26 August 2022, Di Quinzio was loaned to Lucchese.

On 11 July 2023, Di Quinzio was loaned to Fiorenzuola.

On 10 January 2025, he joined Pavia on permanent basis.

On 10 November 2025, he joined Caronnese.

== Honours ==
SPAL

- Serie C - Group B: 2015–16
