= Christian Sussi =

Italian footballer (born 2001)

Personal information
- Date of birth: 7 March 2001 (age 25)
- Place of birth: Arezzo, Italy
- Height: 1.82 m (6 ft 0 in)
- Position: Midfielder

Team information
- Current team: Latina
- Number: 16

Youth career
- Fiorentina
- 2016–2019: Arezzo

Senior career*
Years	Team	Apps	(Gls)
2019–2021	Arezzo	20	(0)
2021–2025	Pisa	1	(0)
2021–2022	→ Paganese (loan)	14	(0)
2022–2024	→ Fiorenzuola (loan)	46	(1)
2025–2026	Pianese	33	(2)
2026–	Latina	2	(0)
- * Club domestic league appearances and goals as of 29 August 2026

Christian Sussi (born 7 March 2001) is an Italian professional footballer who plays as a midfielder for Serie C Group B club Latina.

== Career ==
=== Arezzo ===
In June 2019, Sussi signed his first professional contract with the club. He made his league debut for the club on 25 August 2019, coming on as a late substitute for Niccolò Belloni in a 3-1 victory over Lecco.

=== Pisa ===
On 14 July 2021, he signed a three-year contract with Pisa.

==== Loan to Paganese ====
On 5 August 2021, he joined Paganese on loan.

==== Fiorenzuola ====
On 20 August 2022, Sussi was loaned to Fiorenzuola.
