= Maxime Leverbe =

French footballer (born 1997)

Personal information
- Full name: Maxime Jean Roberto Leverbe
- Date of birth: 15 February 1997 (age 29)
- Place of birth: Villepinte, France
- Height: 1.88 m (6 ft 2 in)
- Position: Defender

Team information
- Current team: Vicenza
- Number: 6

Youth career
- –2016: Ajaccio
- 2016–2017: Sampdoria

Senior career*
Years	Team	Apps	(Gls)
2014–2016	Ajaccio B	26	(1)
2017–2019	Sampdoria	0	(0)
2017–2018	→ Olbia (loan)	14	(1)
2019	→ Cagliari (loan)	0	(0)
2019–2021	Chievo	58	(2)
2021–2024	Pisa	51	(0)
2022	→ Sampdoria (loan)	0	(0)
2022–2023	→ Benevento (loan)	18	(1)
2024–	Vicenza	70	(5)
- * Club domestic league appearances and goals as of 29 April 2026

Maxime Jean Roberto Leverbe (born 15 February 1997) is a French professional footballer who plays as a defender for Serie B club Vicenza.

== Career ==
Leverbe made his Serie C debut for Olbia on 1 October 2017 in a game against Pro Piacenza.

On 31 January 2019, he joined Cagliari on loan until 30 June 2019.

On 3 July 2019, Leverbe signed with Serie B club Chievo.

On 5 August 2021, he joined Pisa. On 14 August, he made his debut for the club against Cagliari in a 3–1 loss in the Coppa Italia. He made his Serie B debut eight days later on 22 August 2021 in a 1–0 win over SPAL.

On 28 July 2022, Leverbe returned to Sampdoria on loan with an option to buy. He remained on the bench in Sampdoria's early season games, and on 1 September 2022, Sampdoria arranged a sub-loan to Benevento, with the consent of Pisa.

On 20 August 2024, Leverbe signed for Vicenza.
