= Nicholas Siega =

Italian footballer

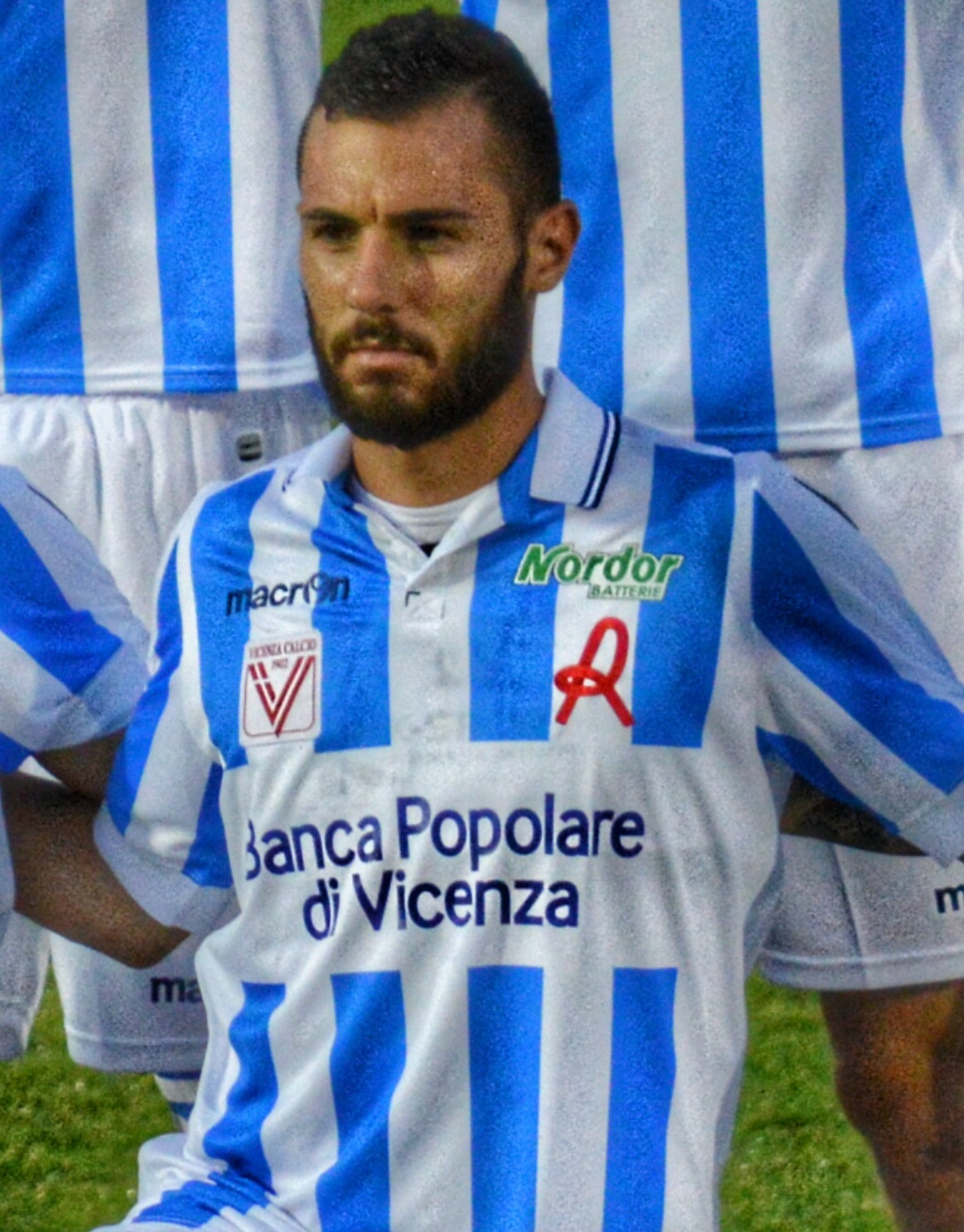

Personal information
- Date of birth: 25 February 1991 (age 35)
- Place of birth: Novara, Italy
- Height: 1.76 m (5 ft 9 1/2 in)
- Position: Forward

Team information
- Current team: Chievo
- Number: 11

Youth career
- –2011: Atalanta
- 2009–2010: → Vigevano (loan)
- 2010–2011: → Casale (loan)

Senior career*
Years	Team	Apps	(Gls)
2011–2013	Casale	64	(7)
2013–2014	Pro Patria	27	(2)
2014–2016	Reggiana	70	(10)
2016–2017	Vicenza	19	(1)
2017–2019	Cittadella	36	(2)
2019–2022	Pisa	70	(2)
2022–2024	Südtirol	15	(0)
2024	Turris	9	(0)
2024–2025	Renate	27	(0)
2025–	Chievo	11	(0)
- * Club domestic league appearances and goals as of 22 February 2026

Nicholas Siega (born 25 February 1991) is an Italian professional footballer who plays as a forward for Serie D club Chievo.

== Club career ==
He made his professional debut in the Lega Pro for Pro Patria on 1 September 2013 in a game against Cremonese.

On 15 July 2019, he signed with Pisa.

On 29 July 2022, Siega signed a two-year deal with Südtirol.

On 1 February 2024, Siega moved to Serie C club Turris.
