= Lorenzo Masetti =

Italian footballer

Personal information
- Date of birth: 15 February 2001 (age 25)
- Place of birth: Florence, Italy
- Height: 1.87 m (6 ft 2 in)
- Position: Defender

Team information
- Current team: Pianese
- Number: 56

Youth career
- –2018: Empoli
- 2018–2020: Pisa

Senior career*
| Years | Team | Apps | (Gls) |
| 2020–2023 | Pisa | 3 | (0) |
| 2021–2022 | → Ancona-Matelica (loan) | 35 | (0) |
| 2022–2023 | → Piacenza (loan) | 27 | (0) |
| 2023–2025 | Arezzo | 20 | (0) |
| 2025 | → Pianese (loan) | 15 | (0) |
| 2025– | Pianese | 21 | (0) |
- * Club domestic league appearances and goals as of 30 April 2026

Lorenzo Masetti (born 15 February 2001) is an Italian professional footballer who plays as a defender for Serie C Group B club Pianese.

== Club career ==
He made his Serie B debut for Pisa on 5 December 2020 in a game against SPAL. He substituted Alessandro De Vitis in the 61st minute of a 0–4 away loss.

On 20 July 2021, he joined Ancona-Matelica on loan. On 19 August 2022, Masetti was loaned to Piacenza.

On 19 July 2023, Masetti signed a two-year contract with Arezzo.
