= Michele Marconi =

Italian footballer (born 1989)

Personal information
- Date of birth: 13 May 1989 (age 37)
- Place of birth: Follonica, Italy
- Height: 1.83 m (6 ft 0 in)
- Position: Forward

Team information
- Current team: Alcione
- Number: 31

Youth career
- –2004: Margine Coperta
- 2004–2008: Atalanta

Senior career*
Years	Team	Apps	(Gls)
2008–2011	Atalanta	7	(1)
2009	→ Grosseto (loan)	5	(0)
2009–2010	→ Lumezzane (loan)	19	(2)
2010	→ Lecco (loan)	11	(2)
2010–2011	→ Pavia (loan)	16	(1)
2011	→ Pergocrema (loan)	13	(1)
2011–2012	SPAL	17	(1)
2012–2013	Venezia	18	(1)
2013–2018	Alessandria	135	(38)
2017	→ Lecce (loan)	13	(3)
2018–2021	Pisa	97	(40)
2021–2022	Alessandria	24	(3)
2022–2023	Südtirol	8	(0)
2023–2024	Avellino	42	(7)
2024–	Alcione	51	(10)

International career
2005	Italy U16	5	(0)
2005–2006	Italy U17	9	(3)
2006	Italy U18	1	(0)
2006	Italy U19	2	(1)
2008	Italy U20	1	(0)
- * Club domestic league appearances and goals as of 29 April 2026

Michele Marconi (born 13 May 1989) is an Italian professional footballer who plays as a forward for Serie C Group A club Alcione.

== Biography ==
Born in Follonica, Tuscany, Marconi started his youth career at Tuscan side Margine Coperta before joined Lombard club Atalanta in July 2004. Marconi was a player of both under-18 youth team and reserve in 2006–07 season.

Marconi made his debut for Atalanta B.C. and Serie A debut on 20 April 2008, the 4th match counting from the last. He played the last 4 matches of 2007-08 season and scored once. In the next season he played 3 times for first team at Serie A, as Atalanta usually promoted players from reserve to the first team at age 19 instead of 20. In January 2009 he was loaned to Grosseto of Serie B. In the whole 2008–09 season, he only played 3 times in the reserve league – Primavera, as well as 8 games in Italian first and second division. In the next season, he left for Lumezzane of Lega Pro Prima Divisione and on 21 January 2010 for Lecco at the same division. He made his team debut on 24 January as starter, and scored twice in the next match.

In July 2010, he was loaned to Pavia, until January 2011.

In January 2011, he was loaned to Pergocrema, until the end of the 2010-11 season.

In July 2011, he was farmed to SPAL in co-ownership deal. In June 2012 Atalanta gave up the remain 50% registration rights.

On 4 August 2012 Marconi joined Venice on free transfer in 2-year contract. On 20 August 2013 he was signed by Alessandria in temporary deal. He also extended his contract with Venice to 30 June 2015.

On 30 January 2017 he moved to Lecce on a temporary basis with a two-year option in favor of the giallorosso club.

On 3 August 2021, he returned to Alessandria.

On 23 August 2022, Marconi signed a two-year deal with Südtirol.

On 31 January 2023, Marconi moved to Avellino.
