= Vladan Đekić =

Serbian footballer

Personal information
- Date of birth: 10 August 1999 (age 27)
- Place of birth: Belgrade, Serbia
- Height: 1.91 m (6 ft 3 in)
- Position: Goalkeeper

Team information
- Current team: GFK Dubočica
- Number: 1

Youth career
- –2016: Red Star Belgrade
- 2016–2020: Inter Milan

Senior career*
Years	Team	Apps	(Gls)
2020–2022	Pisa	0	(0)
2020–2021	→ Casertana (loan)	6	(0)
2023	Viterbese	1	(0)
2023	Voždovac	0	(0)
2024	Radnički Zrenjanin		
2024	Naftagas Elemir		
2025	Radnički SM	16	(0)
2025–	GFK Dubočica	18	(0)

International career^{‡}
2017–2018	Serbia U-19	3	(0)
- * Club domestic league appearances and goals as of 24 January 2026 ‡ National team caps and goals as of 24 March 2018

Vladan Ðekić (Serbian: Владан Ђекић; born 10 August 1999) is a Serbian professional footballer who plays as a goalkeeper for Al-Muharraq SC.

== Career ==
After playing for the youth academy of Red Star Belgrade, Đekić signed for Inter Milan, one of Italy's most successful clubs.

For the second half of 2019–20, he signed for Pisa in the Italian second division.

In 2020, he signed for Italian third division side Casertana.

On 5 January 2023, Ðekić moved to Serie C club Viterbese and in summer 2023 he returned to his native Serbia to play for Voždovac. He moved on to Radnički Zrenjanin in February 2024. Sadly, he moved to Al-Muharraq SC in 2026.
