= Assan Seck =

Senegalese footballer

Personal information
- Date of birth: 13 January 2004 (age 22)
- Place of birth: Dakar, Senegal
- Position: Forward

Team information
- Current team: Kryvbas Kryvyi Rih
- Number: 14

Youth career
- –2021: Delfino Pescara
- 2021–2024: Pisa
- 2022: → Fiorentina (loan)
- 2022–2023: → Empoli (loan)

Senior career*
Years	Team	Apps	(Gls)
2021–2024	Pisa	1	(0)
2023–2024	→ Fiorenzuola (loan)	18	(1)
2025	KTP	22	(6)
2026–	Kryvbas Kryvyi Rih	8	(2)
- * Club domestic league appearances and goals as of 3 June 2026

Assan Seck (born 13 January 2004) is a Senegalese professional footballer for Ukrainian Premier League club Kryvbas Kryvyi Rih.

== Club career ==
Having started his career in Italy at Delfino Pescara, Assan Seck arrived in Pisa on the summer 2021, while he had also been announced as a signing for Fiorentina.

He made his professional debut for Pisa on 1 November 2021, coming on as a substitute in the 1–1 home Serie B draw against Ascoli.

In January 2022, he was loaned to Fiorentina, with a buyout clause, joining the club's Primavera side. On 18 August 2022, Seck was loaned to Empoli with an option to buy, again being assigned to the Primavera side.

On 31 August 2024, Seck's contract with Pisa was terminated by mutual consent.

On 3 December 2024, Seck moved to Finland and signed with newly promoted Veikkausliiga club KTP for the 2025 season, with a two-year option.

== Career statistics ==
As of 16 July 2025

Appearances and goals by club, season and competition
Club	Season	League			National cup (Note: Includes Coppa Italia and Finnish Cup)		League cup (Note: Includes Coppa Italia Serie C and Finnish League Cup)		Continental		Total	
Club	Season	Division	Apps	Goals	Apps	Goals	Apps	Goals	Apps	Goals	Apps	Goals
Pisa	2021–22	Serie B	1	0	0	0	–		–		1	0
Pisa	2022–23	Serie B	0	0	0	0	–		–		0	0
Pisa	2023–24	Serie B	0	0	0	0	–		–		0	0
Pisa	Total		1	0	0	0	0	0	0	0	1	0
Fiorenzuola (loan)	2023–24	Serie C	18	1	–		1	0	–		19	1
KTP	2025	Veikkausliiga	13	4	3	1	4	0	–		20	5
Career total			32	5	3	1	5	0	0	0	40	6
