= Thomas Alberti =

Italian footballer (born 1998)

Personal information
- Date of birth: 23 June 1998 (age 28)
- Place of birth: Asiago, Italy
- Height: 1.91 m (6 ft 3 in)
- Position: Forward

Team information
- Current team: Cavese
- Number: 9

Youth career
- –2017: Bassano

Senior career*
Years	Team	Apps	(Gls)
2017	Bassano	1	(0)
2017–2018	Levico Terme	33	(6)
2018–2022	Pisa	1	(0)
2018–2020	→ Paganese (loan)	43	(5)
2021	→ Matelica (loan)	16	(4)
2021–2022	→ Fidelis Andria (loan)	18	(1)
2022	→ Legnago (loan)	10	(0)
2022–2023	Brusaporto	29	(19)
2023–2024	Fiorenzuola	34	(9)
2024–2025	Modena	1	(0)
2025	→ Pescara (loan)	9	(0)
2025–2026	Novara	28	(5)
2026–	Cavese	1	(0)
- * Club domestic league appearances and goals as of 21 August 2026

Thomas Alberti (born 23 June 1998) is an Italian football player who plays for Serie C Group C club Cavese.

== Club career ==
He made his professional debut in Serie C for Bassano, the club he played for in his junior career, in February 2017. For the 2017–18 season, he moved to Serie D club Levico Terme.

In the summer of 2018, he signed with Pisa. On 23 August 2018, he was loaned to Paganese. On 20 July 2019, the loan was extended for the 2019–20 season.

He made his Serie B debut for Pisa on 20 October 2020 in a game against Monza. He substituted Robert Gucher in the 79th minute.

On 5 January 2021, he extended his contract with Pisa until 30 June 2023 and joined Matelica in Serie C on loan until the end of the 2020–21 season.

On 27 August 2021, he moved on loan to Fidelis Andria.

On 31 January 2022, Alberti was loaned to Legnago.

On 2 July 2023, he signed a 2-year deal for Fiorenzuola.

On 5 July 2024, Alberti joined Modena in Serie B on a two-year contract.
