= Nicolas Izzillo =

Italian footballer

Personal information
- Date of birth: 19 April 1994 (age 32)
- Place of birth: La Maddalena, Italy
- Height: 1.80 m (5 ft 11 in)
- Position: Midfielder

Team information
- Current team: Virtus Francavilla
- Number: 19

Youth career
- –2012: SPAL

Senior career*
| Years | Team | Apps | (Gls) |
| 2012–2013 | Spezia | 1 | (0) |
| 2013–2014 | Bellaria Igea | 28 | (3) |
| 2014–2015 | ACR Messina | 33 | (1) |
| 2015–2016 | Ischia | 17 | (2) |
| 2016–2017 | Juve Stabia | 40 | (8) |
| 2017–2023 | Pisa | 49 | (1) |
| 2020 | → Avellino (loan) | 8 | (0) |
| 2020–2021 | → Casertana (loan) | 24 | (2) |
| 2021–2022 | → Trento (loan) | 17 | (1) |
| 2022–2023 | → Pontedera (loan) | 31 | (0) |
| 2023– | Virtus Francavilla | 26 | (1) |
- * Club domestic league appearances and goals as of 5 May 2024

Nicolas Izzillo (born 19 April 1994) is an Italian footballer who plays as a midfielder for Serie D club Virtus Francavilla.

== Club career ==
He made his Serie B debut for Spezia on 30 October 2012 in a game against Pro Vercelli.

On 21 January 2020 he signed with Avellino.

On 4 October 2020 he joined Casertana on loan.

On 31 August 2021, he was loaned to Trento. On 19 August 2022, Izzillo moved on loan to Pontedera.

On 1 September 2023, Izzillo signed with Virtus Francavilla.
