= Filippo Berra =

Italian football player

Personal information
- Date of birth: 6 February 1995 (age 31)
- Place of birth: Udine, Italy
- Height: 1.83 m (6 ft 0 in)
- Position: Defender

Team information
- Current team: Foggia
- Number: 21

Youth career
- Udinese

Senior career*
| Years | Team | Apps | (Gls) |
| 2012–2015 | Udinese | 0 | (0) |
| 2014–2015 | → Carrarese (loan) | 35 | (1) |
| 2015–2019 | Pro Vercelli | 102 | (8) |
| 2019–2021 | Bari | 22 | (0) |
| 2020–2021 | → Pordenone (loan) | 28 | (1) |
| 2021–2022 | Pisa | 5 | (0) |
| 2022–2023 | Südtirol | 19 | (0) |
| 2023–2025 | Benevento | 64 | (4) |
| 2025–2026 | Crotone | 13 | (1) |
| 2026 | Salernitana | 14 | (0) |
| 2026– | Foggia | 1 | (0) |

International career
| 2013–2014 | Italy U19 | 5 | (0) |
| 2014 | Italy U20 | 1 | (0) |
- * Club domestic league appearances and goals as of 29 August 2026

Filippo Berra (born 6 February 1995) is an Italian professional footballer who plays as a defender for Serie C Group C club Foggia.

== Club career ==
He made his professional debut in the Lega Pro for Carrarese on 30 August 2014 in a game against Tuttocuoio.

On 26 July 2019, he joined Bari on a four-year contract. On 29 September 2020, he joined Pordenone on loan.

On 30 July 2021, Berra joined to Pisa.

On 28 July 2022, Berra moved to Südtirol on a two-year contract.

On 19 August 2023, Berra signed a contract with Benevento.
