= Pietro Beruatto =

Italian footballer (born 1998)

Personal information
- Date of birth: 21 December 1998 (age 27)
- Place of birth: Trieste, Italy
- Height: 1.90 m (6 ft 3 in)
- Position: Full-back

Team information
- Current team: Benevento

Youth career
- 2009–2014: Fiorentina
- 2014–2017: Juventus

Senior career*
Years	Team	Apps	(Gls)
2017–2022	Juventus	0	(0)
2017–2018	→ Vicenza (loan)	12	(0)
2018–2020	Juventus U23	49	(1)
2020–2021	→ Vicenza (loan)	26	(0)
2021–2022	→ Pisa (loan)	39	(1)
2022–2026	Pisa	80	(4)
2025	→ Sampdoria (loan)	16	(0)
2025–2026	→ Spezia (loan)	33	(2)
2026–	Benevento	0	(0)

International career
2016	Italy U18	1	(0)
2016	Italy U19	4	(0)
2017	Italy U20	6	(0)
- * Club domestic league appearances and goals as of 13 May 2026

Pietro Beruatto (born 21 December 1998) is an Italian professional footballer who plays as full-back for Serie B club Benevento.

== Club career ==
=== Vicenza ===
On 28 July 2017, Beruatto was loaned from Juventus to Serie C club Vicenza on a season-long loan deal. On 30 July, Beruatto made his professional debut for Vicenza in a 4–1 home win over Pro Piacenza in the first round of Coppa Italia, he played the entire match. On 27 August, Beruatto made his Serie C debut for Vicenza in a 3–0 home win over Gubbio, he was replaced by Federico Giraudo in the 81st minute. On 10 September, he played his first entire match for Vicenza, a 1–0 home win over Teramo.

In January 2018 he returned to Juventus leaving Vicenza with 14 appearances, 11 as a starter. On 20 August 2020, Beruatto returned on loan to Vicenza.

=== Pisa ===
On 15 July 2021, Beruatto moved to Serie B side Pisa on loan with option to buy, which was exercised on 20 June 2022.

=== Sampdoria ===
On 10 January 2025, Beruatto joined Sampdoria on loan with an option to buy. He also signed a contract with Sampdoria until 30 June 2028 that would have been in effect if Sampdoria exercised the option.

== Personal life ==
Beruatto is the son of Paolo, a former professional footballer who played for Torino, Monza, Avellino and Lazio.

== Career statistics ==
=== Club ===
As of match played 6 April 2025

Club	Season	League			Cup		Europe		Other		Total	
Club	Season	League	Apps	Goals	Apps	Goals	Apps	Goals	Apps	Goals	Apps	Goals
Vicenza (loan)	2017–18	Serie C	12	0	3 (Note: One appearance in Coppa Italia Serie C, two appearances in Coppa Italia)	0	—		—		15	0
Juventus U23	2018–19	Serie C	32	1	1 (Note: Appearances in Coppa Italia Serie C)	0	—		—		33	1
Juventus U23	2019–20	Serie C	17	0	6	1	—		2 (Note: Appearances in Serie C – Promotion play-offs)	0	25	1
Juventus U23	Total		49	1	7	1	—		2	0	58	2
Vicenza (loan)	2020–21	Serie B	26	0	1	0	—		—		27	0
Pisa (loan)	2021–22	Serie B	35	1	0	0	—		4 (Note: Appearances in Serie B – Promotion play-offs)	0	39	1
Pisa	2022–23	Serie B	34	1	1	0	—		—		35	1
Pisa	2023–24	Serie B	30	1	1	0	—		—		31	1
Pisa	2024–25	Serie B	16	0	2	0	—		—		18	0
Pisa	Total		115	3	4	0	—		4	0	123	3
Sampdoria (loan)	2024–25	Serie B	11	0	—		—		—		11	0
Career total			213	4	15	0	—		6	0	234	4

== Honours ==
Juventus U23

- Coppa Italia Serie C: 2019–20
