= Giuseppe Mastinu =

Italian footballer

Personal information
- Date of birth: 9 October 1991 (age 35)
- Place of birth: Sassari, Italy
- Height: 1.75 m (5 ft 9 in)
- Position: Midfielder

Team information
- Current team: Torres
- Number: 10

Senior career*
Years	Team	Apps	(Gls)
2009–2013	Arzachena	96	(13)
2013–2014	Budoni	30	(11)
2014–2016	Olbia	56	(25)
2016–2021	Spezia	68	(7)
2021–2023	Pisa	66	(2)
2023–	Torres	91	(8)
- * Club domestic league appearances and goals as of 30 April 2026

Giuseppe Mastinu (born 9 October 1991) is an Italian professional footballer who plays as a midfielder for Serie C Group B club Torres.

== Club career ==
He made his professional debut in the Serie B for Spezia on 20 September 2016 in a game against Trapani.

On 29 January 2021, he signed a 2.5-year contract with Pisa.

On 28 August 2023, Mastinu moved to Torres in Serie C.
