= Antonio Caracciolo =

Italian footballer (born 1990)

Personal information
- Full name: Antonio Aldo Caracciolo
- Date of birth: 30 June 1990 (age 36)
- Place of birth: Tempio Pausania, Italy
- Height: 1.85 m (6 ft 1 in)
- Position: Centre-back

Team information
- Current team: Pisa
- Number: 4

Youth career
- Inter Milan
- 2007–2010: Pavia

Senior career*
Years	Team	Apps	(Gls)
2008–2010	Pavia	14	(1)
2010	→ Bari (loan)	0	(0)
2010–2012	Genoa	0	(0)
2010–2012	→ Gubbio (loan)	59	(1)
2012–2016	Brescia	92	(2)
2013–2014	→ Cremonese (loan)	24	(3)
2016–2019	Hellas Verona	81	(4)
2019	→ Cremonese (loan)	14	(0)
2019–2020	Cremonese	15	(0)
2020–	Pisa	189	(10)
- * Club domestic league appearances and goals as of 25 May 2026

Antonio Aldo Caracciolo (born 30 June 1990) is an Italian professional footballer who plays as a centre-back for Serie A club Pisa.

== Career ==
Caracciolo was a youth product of Lombard club Inter Milan. He was a player of the under-16 team in 2005–06 season. Caracciolo then left for fellow Lombard club Pavia, at first on loan.

On 29 January 2010, Bari signed the defender on loan until 30 June 2010. He was selected as a substitute once under coach Giampiero Ventura, on 16 May 2010, but did not come off the bench.

=== Genoa ===
On 20 July 2010, he was signed by Genoa. He left the club on loan with Gubbio.

In July 2011 he was loaned to Gubbio again but suffered a minor injury in pre-season.

=== Brescia ===
In summer 2012 Caracciolo was farmed to Serie B club Brescia Calcio on a four-year contract on a co-ownership deal. The club acquired half of the registration rights of the player for a peppercorn fee. In June 2013 Brescia acquired Caracciolo outright.

On 19 July 2013, Caracciolo was transferred to Lega Pro Prima Divisione club U.S. Cremonese on a temporary deal. The club also had an option to sign him outright.

On 1 December 2015, Caracciolo signed a new contract with Brescia, adding two more year to his contract. However, he was sold in summer 2016.

=== Verona ===
On 11 August 2016, Caracciolo was signed by Hellas Verona F.C. He was extremely criticized for this by the Brescia's supporters because Brescia and Verona are huge rivals. After playing 33 matches he gave his contributions to help Verona to get back to Serie A after 2016 relegation. He made his Serie A debut in a home 0–0 against U.C. Sampdoria where he played the full 90 minutes. He scored his first goal in Serie A (and for Verona) in a surprising 3–0 home win against A.C. Milan.

On 10 March 2018, he scored the winning goal in a 1–0 win in the Derby della Scala against Chievo.

=== Cremonese ===
On 16 January 2019, Caracciolo joined to Cremonese on loan with an obligation to buy.

=== Pisa ===
On 27 January 2020, he signed with Pisa.

== Career statistics ==
As of match played 15 March 2026

Appearances and goals by club, season and competition
Club	Season	League			National cup		Continental		Other		Total	
Club	Season	Division	Apps	Goals	Apps	Goals	Apps	Goals	Apps	Goals	Apps	Goals
Gubbio	2010–11	Lega Pro	28	1	2	0	—		1	0	31	1
Gubbio	2011–12	Serie B	31	0	2	0	—		—		33	0
Gubbio	Total		59	1	4	0	0	0	1	0	64	1
Brescia	2012–13	Serie B	19	0	1	0	—		—		20	0
Cremonese (loan)	2013–14	Lega Pro	24	3	2	0	—		2	0	28	3
Brescia	2014–15	Serie B	33	0	1	0	—		—		34	0
Brescia	2015–16	Serie B	40	2	2	0	—		—		42	2
Brescia	2016–17	Serie B	0	0	1	0	—		—		1	0
Brescia	Total		92	2	5	0	0	0	0	0	97	2
Hellas Verona	2016–17	Serie B	33	0	1	0	—		—		34	0
Hellas Verona	2017–18	Serie A	33	2	0	0	—		—		33	2
Hellas Verona	2018–19	Serie B	14	2	1	1	—		—		15	3
Hellas Verona	Total		80	4	2	1	0	0	0	0	82	5
Cremonese (loan)	2018–19	Serie B	14	0	—		—		—		14	0
Cremonese	2019–20	Serie B	15	0	3	0	—		—		18	0
Cremonese	Total		29	0	3	0	0	0	0	0	32	0
Pisa	2019–20	Serie B	15	0	—		—		—		15	0
Pisa	2020–21	Serie B	33	2	0	0	—		—		33	2
Pisa	2021–22	Serie B	36	2	1	0	—		—		37	2
Pisa	2022–23	Serie B	11	0	0	0	—		—		11	0
Pisa	2023–24	Serie B	24	2	0	0	—		—		24	2
Pisa	2024–25	Serie B	35	2	1	0	—		—		36	2
Pisa	2025–26	Serie A	27	2	1	0	—		—		28	2
Pisa	Total		181	10	3	0	0	0	0	0	184	10
Career total			465	20	18	1	0	0	3	0	486	21
