= Giuseppe Sibilli =

Italian footballer

Personal information
- Date of birth: 7 August 1996 (age 30)
- Place of birth: Naples, Italy
- Height: 1.80 m (5 ft 11 in)
- Position: Forward

Team information
- Current team: Juve Stabia

Youth career
- –2014: Napoli

Senior career*
Years	Team	Apps	(Gls)
2014–2015	FC Sant'Agnello		
2015–2016	Siracusa	29	(3)
2016–2017	Catania	0	(0)
2017	Sicula Leonzio	10	(5)
2017–2020	AlbinoLeffe	60	(7)
2018	→ Sicula Leonzio (loan)	4	(0)
2020–2024	Pisa	86	(11)
2023–2024	→ Bari (loan)	35	(11)
2024–2026	Bari	24	(1)
2025	→ Sampdoria (loan)	13	(2)
2026–	Juve Stabia	0	(0)
- * Club domestic league appearances and goals as of 2 March 2026

Giuseppe Sibilli (born 7 August 1996) is an Italian professional footballer who plays as a forward for Serie B club Juve Stabia.

== Career ==
=== Early career ===
Sibilli began his career at hometown club FC Sant'Agnello before moving on to Siracusa. In his sole season with the club, Sibilli found the net five times in 29 appearances as the club secured promotion to Serie C, then known as Lega Pro. In August 2016, Sibilli signed a three-year contract with Catania. After just over half a season with Catania, Sibilli moved to Serie D club Sicula Leonzio, signing a short-term contract until the end of the 2016–17 season.

=== AlbinoLeffe ===
In July 2017, Sibilli signed with Serie C club U.C. AlbinoLeffe. He made his league debut for the club on 27 August 2017, coming on as a 62nd-minute substitute for Mario Ravasio in a 1–0 away defeat to F.C. Südtirol. It took Sibilli nearly a year and a half to score his first goal in a league match, a 60th minute go ahead goal in an eventual 2–2 draw with Teramo in November 2018.

=== Pisa ===
On 23 August 2020, he signed a three-year contract with Pisa.

=== Bari & Sampdoria ===
On 11 August 2023, Sibilli moved on loan to Bari, with an option to buy. On 13 June 2024, Bari exercised the option and signed a three-year contract with Sibilli.

On 31 January 2025, Sibilli joined Sampdoria on loan with an option to buy. He signed a contract with the club until 2028, which would have been in effect if the option was exercised. However, the option to buy was not exercised.

After making 6 appearances for Bari, on 2 October 2025 he was suspended for 8 months and fined €20,000 for betting on several football matches at authorized betting centers from the 2022–2023 season to the 2024–2025 season.

=== Juve Stabia ===
On 31 August 2026, Sibilli joined Juve Stabia for three seasons, remaining in Serie B after Bari's relegation from it.

== Honours ==
Siracusa

- Serie D: 2015–16 (group I)

Sicula Leonzio

- Serie D: 2016–17 (group I)
