= Arena Garibaldi – Stadio Romeo Anconetani =

Multi-use stadium in Pisa, Italy

Coordinates: 43°43′31″N 10°24′00″E

- Cetilar Arena
- Interactive map of Arena Garibaldi – Stadio Romeo Anconetani
- Former names: Arena Garibaldi (1919–1931); Campo Littorio (1931–1949); Arena Garibaldi (1949–2001)
- Location: Pisa, Italy
- Owner: Municipality of Pisa
- Capacity: 25,000 (12,508 approved)
- Surface: Grass; 107x68m

Construction
- Opened: 1919

Tenant
- Pisa S.C.

Arena Garibaldi – Stadio Romeo Anconetani (usually referred to just as Arena Garibaldi or for sponsorship Cetilar® Arena) is a multi-use stadium in Pisa, Italy. It is currently used mostly for football matches and is the home ground of Pisa S.C. The stadium holds 25,000 (12,508 approved) and was opened in 1919.

== History ==
In 2001, the stadium was entitled to Romeo Anconetani, Pisa chairman and owner during their Serie A tenure, as well as colourful figure of Italian football in the 1980s, who died in 1999.

Since 31 July 2024, the stadium is known commercially as the Cetilar Arena for the 2024–25 Serie B season.

== International matches ==
Four international matches of the Italy national football team have taken place at the stadium:

Date	Match	Score	Stage	Attendance
23 September 1987	Italy – Yugoslavia	1–0	Friendly match	21,729
22 February 1989	Italy – Denmark	4–0	Friendly match	20,366
10 February 1999	Italy – Norway	0–0	Friendly match	17,651
6 June 2009	Italy – Northern Ireland	3–0	Friendly match	8,000
