= Leonardo Loria =

Italian footballer (born 1999)

Personal information
- Full name: Leonardo Loria
- Date of birth: 28 March 1999 (age 27)
- Place of birth: Erice, Italy
- Height: 1.95 m (6 ft 5 in)
- Position: Goalkeeper

Team information
- Current team: Pisa

Youth career
- –2012: Città di Trapani
- 2012–2015: Reggina
- 2015–2019: Juventus

Senior career*
Years	Team	Apps	(Gls)
2019–2020	Juventus U23	25	(0)
2020–	Pisa	9	(0)
2021–2022	→ Monopoli (loan)	35	(0)
2022–2023	→ Frosinone (loan)	1	(0)
2025–2026	→ Spezia (loan)	0	(0)

International career^{‡}
2017	Italy U19	1	(0)
2018–2019	Italy U20	3	(0)
- * Club domestic league appearances and goals as of 8 May 2026 ‡ National team caps and goals as of 18:02, 1 March 2020 (UTC)

Leonardo Loria (born 28 March 1999) is an Italian footballer who plays as a goalkeeper for Serie B club Pisa.

== Club career ==
On 28 June 2020, he agreed on a 4-year contract with Pisa.

On 20 July 2021, he joined Monopoli on loan. On 29 July 2022, Loria was loaned to Frosinone, with an option to buy. On 22 August 2025, Loria moved on loan to Spezia, with an option to buy.

== Career statistics ==
=== Club ===
As of match played 6 April 2024

Appearances and goals by club, season and competition
Club	Season	League			Cup		Other		Total	
Club	Season	Division	Apps	Goals	Apps	Goals	Apps	Goals	Apps	Goals
Juventus U23	2018–19	Serie C	1	0	—		0	0	1	0
Juventus U23	2019–20	Serie C	24	0	—		2	0	26	0
Juventus U23	Total		25	0	—		2	0	27	0
Pisa	2020–21	Serie B	1	0	1	0	—		2	0
Pisa	2023–24	Serie B	7	0	0	0	—		7	0
Pisa	Total		8	0	1	0	—		9	0
Monopoli (loan)	2021–22	Serie C	35	0	—		7	0	42	0
Frosinone (loan)	2022–23	Serie B	1	0	0	0	—		1	0
Career total			69	0	1	0	9	0	79	0

== Honours ==
Juventus U23

- Coppa Italia Serie C: 2019–20
