= Alessandro De Vitis =

Italian footballer (born 1992)

Personal information
- Date of birth: 15 February 1992 (age 34)
- Place of birth: Verona, Italy
- Height: 1.84 m (6 ft 0 in)
- Position: Midfielder

Team information
- Current team: Piacenza
- Number: 30

Youth career
- 2006–2009: Fiorentina
- 2009–2011: Parma

Senior career*
| Years | Team | Apps | (Gls) |
| 2011–2013 | Parma | 0 | (0) |
| 2011–2012 | → Modena (loan) | 24 | (2) |
| 2012–2013 | → Padova (loan) | 27 | (2) |
| 2013–2017 | Sampdoria | 0 | (0) |
| 2013–2014 | → Carpi (loan) | 8 | (0) |
| 2015–2016 | → SPAL (loan) | 20 | (0) |
| 2016–2017 | → Latina (loan) | 28 | (2) |
| 2017–2024 | Pisa | 166 | (9) |
| 2024–2025 | Rimini | 31 | (1) |
| 2026– | Piacenza | 5 | (1) |

International career
| 2006–2008 | Italy U16 | 7 | (0) |
| 2008–2009 | Italy U17 | 20 | (2) |
| 2009–2010 | Italy U18 | 7 | (0) |
| 2010–2011 | Italy U19 | 9 | (5) |
| 2011–2012 | Italy U20 | 3 | (1) |
- * Club domestic league appearances and goals as of 22 February 2026

Alessandro De Vitis (born 15 February 1992) is an Italian professional footballer who plays as a midfielder for Serie D club Piacenza. His father is the Italian striker Antonio De Vitis.

== Club career ==
On 21 August 2009, De Vitis moved from Fiorentina to Parma on a permanent deal. He played two seasons with Parma's youth team before he was loaned to Serie B side Modena in the summer of 2011. He made 24 league appearances in the 42-match season, but completed 90 minutes just twice and 14 of the 24 were from the bench.

The following year, he was loaned out to a Serie B side with better promotion prospects: Padova.

On 31 July 2013, De Vitis was signed by fellow Serie A club Sampdoria for €2.3 million in a five-year contract, with Gianni Munari moved to opposite direction for €500,000.

On 2 August 2013, De Vitis was signed by Carpi. On 7 August 2015, he was signed by SPAL.

On 5 August 2024, De Vitis signed a two-season contract with Rimini.

== International career ==
De Vitis has represented his country at international level for the under-16, under-17, under-18, under-19 and under-20 sides.
