= 2024–25 Cesena FC season =

Cesena FC
2024–25 season
- Chairman: John Aiello
- Head coach: Michele Mignani
- Stadium: Stadio Dino Manuzzi
- Serie B: 10th
- Coppa Italia: Round of 16
- Top goalscorer: League: Cristian Shpendi (11); All: Cristian Shpendi (13)
Home colours	Away colours

The 2024–25 season is Cesena FC's 85th season in existence and first season in the Serie B since the club declared bankruptcy in 2018. In addition to the domestic league, the club participated in the Coppa Italia.

== Players ==
=== First-team squad ===
As of 3 February 2025

Note: Flags indicate national team as defined under FIFA eligibility rules; some limited exceptions apply. Players may hold more than one non-FIFA nationality.

No.	Pos.	Nation	Player
1	GK	ITA	Matteo Pisseri
4	MF	ITA	Riccardo Chiarello
5	MF	ITA	Leonardo Mendicino
7	DF	ITA	Daniele Donnarumma
8	MF	BIH	Dario Šarić
9	FW	ALB	Cristian Shpendi
11	MF	GAM	Joseph Ceesay
13	DF	ITA	Raffaele Celia
14	MF	ITA	Tommaso Berti
15	DF	ITA	Andrea Ciofi
17	MF	ITA	Emanuele Adamo
18	FW	ITA	Alessandro Giovannini
19	DF	ITA	Giuseppe Prestia
20	FW	ITA	Elayis Tavşan
22	GK	ALB	Giulio Veliaj
23	FW	ITA	Mirko Antonucci

No.	Pos.	Nation	Player
24	DF	ITA	Massimiliano Mangraviti
26	DF	ITA	Matteo Piacentini
27	FW	ITA	Antonino La Gumina
30	MF	ITA	Simone Bastoni
33	GK	USA	Jonathan Klinsmann
35	MF	ITA	Giacomo Calò
44	DF	ITA	Federico Valentini
70	MF	ITA	Matteo Francesconi
71	DF	ITA	Giulio Manetti
73	DF	ITA	Simone Pieraccini
79	DF	ITA	Enea Pitti
91	FW	ITA	Flavio Russo
92	FW	ITA	Valentino Coveri
93	GK	ITA	Alessandro Siano

== Transfers ==
=== In ===
Pos.	Player	Transferred from	Fee	Date	Source
Summer
DF	(Italy) Massimiliano Mangraviti	(Italy) Brescia	€300k	9 July 2024	
MF	(Italy) Giacomo Calò	(Italy) Cosenza	€250k	9 July 2024	
DF	(Italy) Simone Bastoni	(Italy) Spezia	€100k	9 July 2024	
DW	(Italy) Marco Curto	(Italy) Como	Loan	23 July 2024	
MF	(Italy) Mirko Antonucci	(Italy) Spezia	Loan	31 July 2024	
DW	(Italy) Raffaele Celia	(Italy) Ascoli	Undisclosed	8 August 2024	
FW	(Netherlands) Sydney van Hooijdonk	(Italy) Bologna	Free	9 August 2024	
DW	(Netherlands) Elayis Tavsan	(Italy) Como	Loan	30 August 2024	
MF	(Italy) Leonardo Mendicino	(Italy) Atalanta	Loan	30 August 2024	
MF	(The Gambia) Joseph Ceesay	(Sweden) Malmö FF	Loan	30 August 2024	
FW	(Italy) King Udoh	(Italy) Gubbio	Loan return	30 June 2024	
GK	(United States) Luca Lewis	(Italy) Pontedera	Loan return	30 June 2024	
GK	(Italy) Lorenzo Pollini	(Italy) Trestina	Loan return	30 June 2024	
Winter
FW	(Italy) Antonino La Gumina	(Italy) Sampdoria	Loan	9 January 2025	
MF	(Bosnia and Herzegovina) Dario Šarić	(Italy) Palermo	Loan	31 January 2025	
FW	(Italy) Cristiano Giometti	(Italy) San Marino	Loan return	2 January 2025	
DF	(Italy) Diego Rossi	(Italy) Arzignano	Loan return	2 February 2025	
MF	(Italy) Alessandro Giovannini	(Italy) Pineto	Loan return	3 February 2025	
FW	(Italy) Flavio Russo	(Italy) Sassuolo	Loan	3 February 2025	

=== Out ===
Pos.	Player	Transferred to	Fee	Date	Source
Summer
FW	(Italy) Simone Corazza	(Italy) Ascoli	€200k	8 August 2024	
MF	(Italy) Francesco De Rose	(Italy) Catania	Free transfer	30 August 2024	
DF	(Italy) Luca Coccolo	(Italy) Torres	Free transfer	13 July 2024	
MF	(Italy) Giovanni Nannelli	(Italy) Chievo Verona	Free transfer	11 July 2024	
GK	(Italy) Lorenzo Pollini	(Italy) Palmese	Free transfer	5 August 2024	
FW	(Italy) King Udoh	(Italy) Trapani	Undisclosed	9 July 2024	
MF	(Italy) Ivan Varone	(Italy) Ascoli	Undisclosed	7 August 2024	
DF	(Italy) Luigi Silvestri	(Italy) Trapani	Loan	29 August 2024	
FW	(Italy) Roberto Ogunseye	(Italy) Arezzo	Loan	28 August 2024	
DF	(Romania) Antonio David	(Italy) AS Gubbio	Loan	23 July 2024	
MF	(Italy) Fabrizio Lilli	(Italy) Forlì	Loan	22 July 2024	
MF	(Italy) Alessandro Giovannini	(Italy) Pineto	Loan	23 July 2024	
GK	(United States) Luca Lewis	Unattached	End of Contract	1 July 2024	
DF	(Italy) Edoardo Pierozzi	(Italy) Fiorentina	Loan return	30 June 2024	
Winter
MF	(Tunisia) Saber Hraiech	(Italy) Trapani	Undisclosed	3 January 2025	
FW	(Italy) Cristiano Giometti	(Italy) Pistoiese	Loan	3 January 2025	
FW	(Netherlands) Sydney van Hooijdonk	(Netherlands) NAC Breda	Undisclosed	9 January 2025	
DF	(Italy) Marco Curto	(Italy) Como	End of loan	23 January 2025	
FW	(Sierra Leone) Augustus Kargbo	(England) Blackburn Rovers	€1.20m	31 January 2025	
DF	(Italy) Diego Rossi	(Italy) Cavese	Loan	3 February 2025	
MF	(Italy) Riccardo Chiarello	(Italy) Campobasso	Free transfer	6 February 2025	

== Friendlies ==
=== Pre-season ===
14 July 2024 Friendly	Cesena (Italy)	18–0	(Italy) Alto Savio
		Report

18 July 2024 Friendly	Cesena (Italy)	8–1	(Italy) SSD Sampierana
		Report

== Competitions ==
=== Overall record ===
Competition	First match	Last match	Starting round	Final position	Record							
Competition	First match	Last match	Starting round	Final position	Pld	W	D	L	GF	GA	GD	Win %
Serie B	18 August 2024	9 May 2025	Matchday 1	TBD	34	11	11	12	42	43	−1	32.35
Coppa Italia	4 August 2024	18 December 2024	Qualifying Round	Round of 16	4	3	0	1	7	8	−1	75.00
Total					38	14	11	13	49	51	−2	36.84

Last updated: 24 September 2024
Source: Competitions

=== Serie B ===
==== League table ====
Pos	Team	Pld	W	D	L	GF	GA	GD	Pts	Promotion, qualification or relegation
5	Juve Stabia	38	14	13	11	42	41	+1	55	Qualification for promotion play-offs preliminary round
6	Catanzaro	38	11	20	7	51	45	+6	53	Qualification for promotion play-offs preliminary round
7	Cesena	38	14	11	13	46	47	−1	53	Qualification for promotion play-offs preliminary round
8	Palermo	38	14	10	14	52	43	+9	52	Qualification for promotion play-offs preliminary round
9	Bari	38	10	18	10	41	40	+1	48	

Source: Serie BKT
Rules for classification: 1) Points; 2) Head-to-head points; 3) Head-to-head goal difference; 4) Goal difference; 5) Goals scored; 6) Draw.
(Note: Head-to-head record is used only after all the matches between the teams in question have been played)

==== Results summary ====
Overall								Home						Away					
Pld	W	D	L	GF	GA	GD	Pts	W	D	L	GF	GA	GD	W	D	L	GF	GA	GD
34	11	11	12	42	43	−1	44	7	7	4	25	20	+5	4	4	8	17	23	−6

Last updated: 15 February 2025.
Source: SofaScore

==== Results by round ====
Round	1	2	3	4	5	6	7	8	9	10	11	12	13	14	15	16	17	18	19	20	21	22	23	24	25	26	27	28	29	30	31	32	33	34	35	36	37	38
Ground	H	A	H	A	H	A	H	A	H	H	A	H	A	H	A	A	H	A	H	A	H	A	H	A	A	H	A	H	A	H	H	A	H	H	A	H	A	A
Result	W	L	W	L	D	D	W	L	L	W	D	W	W	D	L	L	W	L	L	L	D	W	D	L	W	D	W	W	D	D	L	D	D	L				
Position	7	4	10	4	7	8	10	5	8	13	8	8	4	4	4	5	6	5	6	6	10	10	9	9	10	8	8	8	6	7	8	8	9	10				

Updated to match(es) played on 18 March 2025. Source: Worldfootball
A = Away; H = Home; W = Win; D = Draw; L = Loss

==== Matches ====
The match schedule was released on 10 July 2024.

18 August 2024 1	Cesena	2–1	Carrarese	Catanzaro
20:30 CET	Shpendi 8' 23'; Palmieri (yellow card) 20'		Curto (yellow card) 33'; Schiavi 55'; Pisseri (yellow card) 59'; Calo (yellow card) 68'	Stadium: Orogel Stadium; Attendance: 11,382; Referee: (Italy) Alessandro Prontera

24 August 2024 2	Sassuolo	2–1	Cesena	Reggio Emilia
14:30	Antiste 34' (yellow card) 74'; Odenthal (yellow card) 36'; Flavio Russo 65'; Boloca (yellow card) 90+4'	Report	Curto (yellow card) 10' (goal) 53'; Berti (yellow card) 80'	Stadium: Mapei Stadium – Città del Tricolore; Attendance: 5,017; Referee: (Italy) Luca Massimi

28 August 2024 3	Cesena	2–0	Catanzaro	Cesena
20:30 CEST	Kargbo 18' (yellow card) 45+1'; Emanuele Adamo 47'; Calò (yellow card) 50'; Mangraviti (yellow card) 59'; Curto (yellow card) 69'	Report	Matias Antonini (yellow card) 45+1'; Iemmello (yellow card) 78'; Seck (yellow card) 83'	Stadium: Stadio Dino Manuzzi; Attendance: 11,870; Referee: (Italy) Giuseppe Collu

1 September 2024 4	Spezia	2–1	Cesena	La Spezia
20:30 CEST	Nagy (yellow card) 42'; Bertola (yellow card) 47' (goal) 90+11'; Hristov (yellow card) 76'; Soleri 84'	Report	Berti 5'; Bastoni (yellow card) 50'; Kargbo (yellow card) 55'	Stadium: Stadio Alberto Picco; Attendance: 7,573; Referee: (Italy) Gianluca Aureliano

13 September 2024 5	Cesena	2–2	Modena	Cesena
20:30 CEST	Shpendi (yellow card) 25' (goal) 45+1' (pen.); Bastoni 39'	Report	Pedro Mendes 28'; Cotali (yellow card) 32'; Palumbo (yellow card) 49'; Zaro 55'; Caldara (red card) 65'	Stadium: Stadio Dino Manuzzi; Attendance: 13,974; Referee: (Italy) Marco Monaldi

21 September 2024 6	Palermo	0–0	Cesena	Palermo
15:00 CEST	Diakité (yellow card) 45+1'; Segre (yellow card) 53'; Pierozzi (yellow card) 56'; Šarić (yellow card) 70'	Report	Donnarumma (yellow card) 29'; Curto (yellow card) 40'; Calò (yellow card) 69'; Ciofi (yellow card) 79'; Prestia (yellow card) 89'	Stadium: Stadio Renzo Barbera; Attendance: 23,230; Referee: (Italy) Gianluca Manganiello

29 September 2024 7	Cesena	4–2	Mantova	Cesena
15:00 CEST	Shpendi 5'; Kargbo 21' (yellow card) 32'; Prestia 43'; Calò (yellow card) 45'; Tavşan 70'; Mangraviti (yellow card) 77'	Report	Trimboli (yellow card) 12'; Redolfi 58'; Francesco Ruocco 84'	Stadium: Stadio Dino Manuzzi; Attendance: 12,326; Referee: (Italy) Daniele Chiffi

5 October 2024 8	Pisa	3–1	Cesena	Pisa
15:00 CET	Lind 23'; Canestrelli 38'; Marin (yellow card) 50'; Donnarumma 55' (o.g.); Abildgaard (yellow card) 87'; Bonfanti (yellow card) 90+3'	Report	Celia (yellow card) 12'; Prestia 76'	Stadium: Arena Garibaldi – Stadio Romeo Anconetani; Attendance: 7,915; Referee: (Italy) Paride Tremolada

20 October 2024 9	Cesena	3–5	Sampdoria	Cesena
17:15 CET	Prestia 13'; Emanuele Adamo 27'; Ciofi (yellow card) 45+1'; Kargbo 64' (yellow card) 90' (red card) 90'; van Hooijdonk (yellow card) 90+3'	Report	Prestia 14' (o.g.); Meulensteen 22' 55'; Ioannou (yellow card) 53'; Tutino 61'; Venuti (yellow card) 78'; Akinsanmiro 88'	Stadium: Stadio Dino Manuzzi; Attendance: 12,000; Referee: (Italy) Marco Piccinini

26 October 2024 10	Cesena	2–0	Brescia	Cesena
15:00 CET	Tavşan (yellow card) 10'; Shpendi 15' (pen.) 53' (pen.); Bastoni (yellow card) 18'; Calò (yellow card) 33'; Pisseri (yellow card) 54'; Prestia (yellow card) 90+3'	Report	Adorni (yellow card) 76'	Stadium: Stadio Dino Manuzzi; Attendance: 11,816; Referee: (Italy) Kevin Bonacina

29 October 2024 11	Salernitana	1–1	Cesena	Salerno
20:30 CET	Verde 20'; Fiorillo (red card) 42'; Maggiore (yellow card) 52'; Tello (yellow card) 90'; Ferrari (yellow card) 90+3'	Report	Matteo Francesconi (yellow card) 15'; Ceesay (yellow card) 22'; Bastoni (yellow card) 26'; Tavşan 45+3'	Stadium: Stadio Arechi; Attendance: 10,141; Referee: (Italy) Gabriele Scatena

3 November 2024 12	Cesena	1–0	Südtirol	Cesena
15:00 CET	Shpendi 52'; Emanuele Adamo (yellow card) 85'	Report	Valerio Crespi (yellow card) 87'; Zedadka (yellow card) 89'	Stadium: Stadio Dino Manuzzi; Attendance: 10,754; Referee: (Italy) Luca Massimi

10 November 2024 13	Cittadella	2–0	Cesena
09:00				Attendance: 4,082

23 November 2024 14	Cesena	1–1	Reggiana
11:15				Attendance: 12,513

1 December 2024 15	Frosinone	2–3	Cesena
09:00				Attendance: 9,698

7 December 2024 16	Bari	0–1	Cesena
09:00				Attendance: 14,696

14 December 2024 17	Cesena	2–1	Cosenza
09:00				Attendance: 10,732

22 December 2024 18	Juve Stabia	0–1	Cesena
09:00				Attendance: 4,767

26 December 2024 19	Cesena	0–1	Cremonese
14:00				Attendance: 11,088

29 December 2024 20	Carrarese	0–2	Cesena
14:00				Attendance: 3,813

12 January 2025 21	Cesena	0–0	Cittadella
16:15				Attendance: 10,065

17 January 2025 22	Sampdoria	2–1	Cesena
19:30				Attendance: 21,078

25 January 2025 23	Cesena	1–1	Bari
14:00				Attendance: 12,949

1 February 2025 24	Catanzaro	2–4	Cesena
14:00				Attendance: 8,514

9 February 2025 25	Reggiana	1–0	Cesena
14:00				Attendance: 10,372

16 February 2025 26	Cesena	1–1	Pisa
16:15				Attendance: 11,376

22 February 2025 27	Cremonese	2–1	Cesena
16:15				Attendance: 7,404

1 March 2025 28	Cesena	2–0	Salernitana
14:00				Attendance: 10,895

6 March 2025 29	Brescia	1–1	Cesena
18:30				Attendance: 4,818

15 March 2025 30	Cesena	0–0	Spezia
14:00				Attendance: 11,927

30 March 2025 31	Cesena	1–2	Juve Stabia
14:00

5 April 2025 32	Südtirol	1–1	Cesena
14:00

14 April 2025 33	Cesena	1–1	Frosinone
14:00

25 April 2025 34	Cesena	0–2	Sassuolo
19:30

1 May 2025 35	Mantova	v	Cesena
9:00

4 May 2025 36	Cesena	v	Palermo
9:00

9 May 2025 37	Cosenza	v	Cesena
14:30

13 May 2025 38	Modena	v	Cesena
14:30

=== Coppa Italia ===
4 August 2024 Qualifying Round	Cesena	3–1	Calcio Padova	Cesena
19:30 CET	Kargbo 9'; Shpendi 38'; Curto (yellow card) 50'; Antonucci (yellow card) 77'; Francesconi 86'		Baldini 48'	Stadium: Stadio Dino Manuzzi; Attendance: 4,428; Referee: (Italy) Luca De Angeli

10 August 2024 First Round	Hellas Verona	1–2	Cesena	Verona
19:30 CET	Coppola (yellow card) 49'; Magnani (yellow card) 56'; Silva (yellow card) 61'; Tengstedt 75'; Tchatchoua (yellow card) 80'; Duda (yellow card) 90+2'		Kargbo 44'; Shpendi 49'; Francesconi (yellow card) 90+4'	Stadium: Stadio Marcantonio Bentegodi; Attendance: 7,148; Referee: (Italy) Valerio Crezzini

25 September 2024 Second Round	Pisa	0–1	Cesena	Pisa
15:00 CET	Lind (yellow card) 36'; Calabresi (yellow card) 51'; Bonfanti (yellow card) 57'		Pieraccini (yellow card) 10'; Adamo (yellow card) 44'; Celia 54'; Mendicino (yellow card) 65'; Ciofi (yellow card) 80'	Stadium: Arena Garibaldi – Stadio Romeo Anconetani; Attendance: 3,347; Referee: (Italy) Daniele Rutella

18 December 2024 Round of 16	Atalanta	6–1	Cesena	Bergamo
17:30 CET	Zappacosta 4'; De Ketelaere 8' 35'; Samardzic 27' 71'; Djimsiti (yellow card) 28'; Tolói (yellow card) 45'; Brescianini 54'		Bastoni (yellow card) 53'; Ceesay 90'	Stadium: Gewiss Stadium; Attendance: 20,234; Referee: (Italy) Daniele Perenzoni
