= 2023–24 Cesena FC season =

Cesena FC
2023–24 season
- Manager: Domenico Toscano
- Stadium: Stadio Dino Manuzzi
- Serie C: 1st (promoted)
- Coppa Italia: Round of 64
- Coppa Italia Serie C: Round of 16
- Top goalscorer: League: Cristian Shpendi (8); All: Cristian Shpendi (8)

The 2023–24 season was Cesena FC's 84th season in existence and fifth consecutive season in the Serie C. They also competed in the Coppa Italia and the Coppa Italia Serie C.

== Players ==
=== First-team squad ===
As of 1 September 2023.

Note: Flags indicate national team as defined under FIFA eligibility rules; some limited exceptions apply. Players may hold more than one non-FIFA nationality.

No.	Pos.	Nation	Player
1	GK	ITA	Matteo Pisseri
4	MF	ITA	Riccardo Chiarello
5	MF	ITA	Ivan Varone
6	MF	FRA	Jonathan Bumbu
7	FW	ITA	Daniele Donnarumma
8	MF	ITA	Saber Hraiech
9	FW	ALB	Cristian Shpendi
10	FW	SLE	Augustus Kargbo
11	FW	ITA	Roberto Ogunseye
13	DF	ITA	Luca Coccolo
14	MF	ITA	Tommaso Berti
15	DF	ITA	Andrea Ciofi
17	MF	ITA	Emanuele Adamo
18	FW	ITA	Simone Corazza

No.	Pos.	Nation	Player
19	DF	ITA	Giuseppe Prestia
20	MF	ITA	Francesco De Rose
24	MF	ITA	Edoardo Pierozzi (on loan from Fiorentina)
25	DF	ITA	Antonio David
26	DF	ITA	Matteo Piacentini
28	DF	ITA	Luigi Silvestri
30	MF	ITA	Alessandro Giovannini
34	GK	ITA	Giulio Veliaj
46	GK	ITA	Alessandro Bagli
61	GK	ITA	Alessandro Siano
70	MF	ITA	Matteo Francesconi
73	DF	ITA	Simone Pieraccini
77	MF	ITA	Giovanni Nannelli

=== Out on loan ===
Note: Flags indicate national team as defined under FIFA eligibility rules; some limited exceptions apply. Players may hold more than one non-FIFA nationality.

No.	Pos.	Nation	Player
—	GK	USA	Luca Lewis (at Pontedera until 30 June 2024)
—	GK	ITA	Lorenzo Pollini (at Cjarlins Muzane until 30 June 2024)

No.	Pos.	Nation	Player
—	FW	ALB	Stiven Shpendi (at Empoli until 30 June 2025)
—	FW	ITA	King Udoh (at Gubbio until 30 June 2024)

== Transfers ==
=== In ===
Pos.	Player	Transferred from	Fee	Date	Source

=== Out ===
Pos.	Player	Transferred to	Fee	Date	Source

== Pre-season and friendlies ==
Win Draw Loss Fixtures

30 July 2023 Friendly	Forlì (Italy)	1–4	(Italy) Cesena
--:-- CEST (UTC+2)

== Competitions ==
=== Overall record ===
Competition	First match	Last match	Starting round	Final position	Record							
Competition	First match	Last match	Starting round	Final position	Pld	W	D	L	GF	GA	GD	Win %
Serie C	3 September 2023	28 April 2024	Matchday 1	Winners	37	29	6	2	78	19	+59	78.38
Coppa Italia	6 August 2023	11 August 2023	Preliminary round	Round of 64	2	0	1	1	2	4	−2	0.00
Coppa Italia Serie C	8 November 2023	28 November 2023	Second round	Round of 16	2	1	0	1	1	2	−1	50.00
Total					41	30	7	4	81	25	+56	73.17

Last updated: 21 April 2024
Source: Soccerway

=== Serie C ===
==== League table ====
Pos	Team	Pld	W	D	L	GF	GA	GD	Pts	Qualification
1	Cesena (C, P)	38	30	6	2	80	19	+61	96	Promotion to Serie B and Supercoppa di Serie C
2	Torres	38	22	9	7	56	38	+18	75	National play-offs 2nd round
3	Carrarese (O, P)	38	21	10	7	54	30	+24	73	National play-offs 1st round
4	Perugia	38	17	12	9	44	35	+9	63	Group play-offs 2nd round
5	Gubbio	38	16	11	11	50	38	+12	59	Group play-offs 1st round

Updated to match(es) played on 28 April 2024. Source: Lega Pro, Soccerway (in English)
Rules for classification: 1) Points; 2) Head-to-head points; 3) Head-to-head goal difference; 4) Goal difference; 5) Goals scored; 6) Lower goals against; 7) Wins; 8) Lower losses; 9) Away wins; 10) Lower home losses.
(Note: Head-to-head record is used only after all the matches between the teams in question have been played)
(C) Champions; (O) Play-off winners; (P) Promoted

==== Results summary ====
Overall								Home						Away					
Pld	W	D	L	GF	GA	GD	Pts	W	D	L	GF	GA	GD	W	D	L	GF	GA	GD
38	30	6	2	80	19	+61	96	17	2	0	46	7	+39	13	4	2	34	12	+22

Last updated: 21 April 2024.
Source: Worldfootball

==== Results by round ====
Round	1	2	3	4	5	6	7	8	9	10	11	12	13	14	15	16	17	18	19	20	21	22	23	24	25	26	27	28	29	30	31	32	33	34	35	36	37	38
Ground	A	H	A	H	A	H	A	H	A	A	H	A	H	H	A	H	A	H	A	H	A	H	A	H	A	H	A	H	H	A	H	A	A	H	A	H	A	H
Result	L	W	W	W	W	W	W	D	D	W	W	D	W	W	W	W	W	D	W	W	D	W	W	W	W	W	W	W	W	L	W	W	W	W	W	W	D	W
Position	14	7	5	3	2	2	2	2	2	2	2	1	1	1	1	1	1	1	1	1	1	1	1	1	1	1	1	1	1	1	1	1	1	1	1	1	1	1

Updated to match(es) played on 17 December 2023. Source: Worldfootball
A = Away; H = Home; W = Win; D = Draw; L = Loss

==== Matches ====
The league fixtures were unveiled on 7 August 2023.

3 September 2023 1	Olbia	2–1	Cesena	Olbia
20:45 CEST (UTC+2)	Nanni 28'; Ragatzu 38' (pen.)	Report	Ogunseye 73'	Stadium: Stadio Bruno Nespoli; Referee: Mattia Caldera

15 September 2023 3	Pontedera	1–3	Cesena	Pontedera
20:45 CEST (UTC+2)				Stadium: Stadio Ettore Mannucci

19 September 2023 4	Cesena	4–0	Ancona	Cesena
20:45 CEST (UTC+2)				Stadium: Stadio Dino Manuzzi

23 September 2023 5	Fermana	0–4	Cesena	Fermo
20:45 CEST (UTC+2)				Stadium: Stadio Bruno Recchioni

27 September 2023 2	Cesena	3–1	SPAL	Cesena
20:45 CEST (UTC+2)				Stadium: Stadio Dino Manuzzi; Referee: Michele Delrio

1 October 2023 6	Cesena	5–2	Rimini	Cesena
16:15 CEST (UTC+2)	Varone 29'; Berti 36'; Donnarumma 52'; Shpendi 54'; Colombo 69' (o.g.)		Lamesta 26'; Marchesi 63'	Stadium: Stadio Dino Manuzzi

9 October 2023 7	Arezzo	0–2	Cesena	Arezzo
20:45 CEST (UTC+2)				Stadium: Stadio Città di Arezzo

15 October 2023 8	Cesena	2–2	Sestri Levante	Cesena
18:30 CEST (UTC+2)				Stadium: Stadio Dino Manuzzi

22 October 2023 9	Pineto	1–1	Cesena	Pescara
18:30 CEST (UTC+2)				Stadium: Stadio Adriatico – Giovanni Cornacchia; Referee: Carlo Rinaldi

30 October 2023 11	Cesena	2–1	Carrarese	Cesena
20:45 CET (UTC+1)	Kargbo 14', 72'		Di Gennaro 83'	Stadium: Stadio Dino Manuzzi; Referee: Andrea Bordin

5 November 2023 12	Gubbio	1–1	Cesena	Gubbio
18:30 CET (UTC+1)	Di Massimo 17'		Adamo 37'	Stadium: Stadio Pietro Barbetti; Referee: Antonino Costanza

12 November 2023 13	Cesena	4–0	Vis Pesaro	Cesena
20:45 CET (UTC+1)				Stadium: Stadio Dino Manuzzi

16 November 2023 10	Virtus Entella	0–1	Cesena	Chiavari
20:45 CET (UTC+1)				Stadium: Stadio Comunale
Note: The match scheduled for 26 October 2023, was postponed.

2 December 2023 16	Cesena	1–0	Juventus Next Gen	Cesena
16:15 CET (UTC+1)	Pieraccini 69'			Stadium: Stadio Dino Manuzzi; Referee: Giorgio Bozzetto

9 December 2023 17	Recanatese	1–2	Cesena	Recanati
20:45 CET (UTC+1)				Stadium: Stadio Nicola Tubaldi

17 December 2023 18	Cesena	1–1	Torres	Cesena
14:00 CET (UTC+1)				Stadium: Stadio Dino Manuzzi

23 December 2023 19	Perugia	0–3	Cesena	Perugia
18:30 CET (UTC+1)				Stadium: Stadio Renato Curi

7 January 2024 20	Cesena	1–0	Olbia Calcio	Cesena
15:15 CET (UTC+1)				Stadium: Stadio Dino Manuzzi

11 March 2024 31	Cesena	2–0	Gubbio	Cesena
20:30

17 March 2024 32	Vis Pesaro	0–2	Cesena	Pesaro
20:45

24 March 2024 33	Lucchese	0–1	Cesena	Lucca
14:00				Stadium: Stadio Porta Elisa

30 March 2024 34	Cesena	1–0	Pescara	Cesena
16:15				Stadium: Stadio Dino Manuzzi

7 April 2024 35	Juventus Next Gen	1–2	Cesena	Alessandria
16:15

15 April 2024 36	Cesena	3–0	Recanatese	Cesena
20:45				Stadium: Stadio Dino Manuzzi

21 April 2024 37	Torres	1–1	Cesena	Sassari
16:30

28 April 2024 38	Cesena	v	Perugia	Cesena
20:00				Stadium: Stadio Dino Manuzzi

=== Coppa Italia ===
6 August 2023 Preliminary round	Cesena	2–2 (a.e.t.)	Virtus Entella	Cesena
20:30 CEST (UTC+2)	Shpendi 17'; Ciofi 45'	Report	Meazzi 51', 56'	Stadium: Stadio Dino Manuzzi; Attendance: 3,418; Referee: Matteo Gualtieri
	Penalties
	Mercadante (penalty missed); Corazza (penalty scored); Ciofi (penalty missed); Silvestri (penalty scored); Shpendi (penalty scored); Berti (penalty scored); Hraiech (penalty missed); Piacentini (penalty scored); Pierozzi (penalty scored)		(penalty missed) Disanto; (penalty scored) Tomaselli; (penalty scored) Banfi; (penalty missed) Zappella; (penalty scored) Lipani; (penalty scored) De Lucia; (penalty missed) Siatounis; (penalty scored) Bonini; (penalty missed) Thioune

11 August 2023 Round of 64	Bologna	2–0	Cesena	Bologna
21:15 CEST (UTC+2)	Corazza 2'; Zirkzee 80'	Report	Adamo (yellow card) 37'	Stadium: Stadio Renato Dall'Ara; Attendance: 14,139; Referee: Gianluca Manganiello

=== Coppa Italia Serie C ===
8 November 2023 Second round	Cesena	1–0	Vis Pesaro	Cesena
20:45 CET (UTC+1)	Corazza 76'			Stadium: Stadio Dino Manuzzi; Referee: Aleksandar Djurdjevic
