= 2023–24 Coppa Italia =

Tournament details
- Country: Italy
- Dates: 5 August 2023 – 15 May 2024
- Teams: 44

Final positions
- Champions: Juventus (15th title)
- Runners-up: Atalanta

Tournament statistics
- Matches played: 45
- Goals scored: 144 (3.2 per match)
- Top goal scorer: Arkadiusz Milik (4 goals)

The 2023–24 Coppa Italia (branded as the Coppa Italia Frecciarossa for sponsorship reasons), was the 77th edition of the national domestic football tournament. There were 44 participating teams.

Internazionale were the defending two-time consecutive cup title holders, but were eliminated by Bologna.

Juventus extended its record to fifteenth cup titles after defeating Atalanta 1–0 in the final.

== Participating teams ==
Serie A The 20 clubs of the 2023–24 season	Serie B Eighteen clubs of the 2023–24 season	Serie C Six clubs of the 2023–24 season
Atalanta; Bologna; Cagliari; Empoli; Fiorentina; Frosinone; Genoa; Hellas Verona; Internazionale; Juventus; Lazio; Lecce; Milan; Monza; Napoli; Roma; Salernitana; Sassuolo; Torino; Udinese	Ascoli; Bari; Catanzaro; Cittadella; Como; Cosenza; Cremonese; Feralpisalò; Modena; Palermo; Parma; Pisa; Reggiana; Sampdoria; Spezia; Südtirol; Ternana; Venezia	Cesena; Crotone; Virtus Entella; Foggia; Pescara; Vicenza

== Format and seeding ==
This was the last edition of the Coppa Italia to use extra time in rounds prior to the semi-finals. Beginning with the 2024–25 edition, matches drawn after 90 minutes in rounds prior to the semi-finals will proceed immediately to a penalty shoot-out.

Teams entered the competition at various stages, as follows:

- First phase (one-legged fixtures)
  - Preliminary round: five teams from Serie C and 3 Serie B teams started the tournament
  - First round: the four winners were joined by 1 Serie C team, 15 Serie B teams, and 12 teams from Serie A
  - Second round: the 16 winners faced each other
- Second phase
  - Round of 16 (one-legged): the eight winners were joined by Serie A clubs, seeded 1–8
  - Quarter-finals (one-legged): the eight winners faced each other
  - Semi-finals (two-legged): the four winners faced each other
  - Final (one-legged): the two winners faced each other

== Round dates ==
Phase	Round	Clubs remaining	Clubs involved	From previous round	Entries in this round	First leg	Second leg
First stage	Preliminary round	44	8	none	8	5–6 August 2023	
First stage	First round	40	32	4	28	11–14 August 2023	
First stage	Second round	24	16	16	none	31 October–2 November 2023	
Second stage	Round of 16	16	16	8	8	5–20 December 2023 and 2–4 January 2024	
Second stage	Quarter-finals	8	8	8	none	9–11 January 2024	
Second stage	Semi-finals	4	4	4	none	2–3 April 2024	23–24 April 2024
Second stage	Final	2	2	2	none	15 May 2024	

== First stage ==
=== Preliminary round ===
A total of eight teams from Serie B and Serie C competed in this round, four of which advanced.

5 August 2023	Catanzaro (2)	1–0	Foggia (3)	Vibo Valentia
18:00 CEST	Curcio 70'	Report		Stadium: Stadio Luigi Razza; Attendance: 0 Referee: Francesco Cosso

6 August 2023	Reggiana (2)	6–2	Pescara (3)	Chiavari
18:00 CEST	Lanini 35', 65'; Portanova 40'; Girma 42'; Cigarini 57'; Vido 83'	Report	Accornero 13'; Cuppone 26'	Stadium: Stadio Comunale; Attendance: 1,403; Referee: Davide Di Marco

6 August 2023	Feralpisalò (2)	2–1	Vicenza (3)	Piacenza
20:00 CEST	Di Molfetta 17'; Felici 31'	Report	Laezza 68'	Stadium: Stadio Leonardo Garilli; Attendance: 670; Referee: Marco Monaldi

6 August 2023	Cesena (3)	2–2 (a.e.t.) (6–5 p)	Virtus Entella (3)	Cesena
20:30 CEST	Shpendi 17'; Ciofi 45'	Report	Meazzi 51', 56'	Stadium: Stadio Dino Manuzzi; Attendance: 3,418; Referee: Matteo Gualtieri
	Penalties
	Mercadante (penalty missed); Corazza (penalty scored); Ciofi (penalty missed); Silvestri (penalty scored); Shpendi (penalty scored); Berti (penalty scored); Hraiech (penalty missed); Piacentini (penalty scored); Pierozzi (penalty scored)		(penalty missed) Disanto; (penalty scored) Tomaselli; (penalty scored) Banfi; (penalty missed) Zappella; (penalty scored) Lipani; (penalty scored) De Lucia; (penalty missed) Siatounis; (penalty scored) Bonini; (penalty missed) Thioune

=== First round ===
A total of 32 teams (4 winners from the preliminary round, 1 team from Serie C, the remaining 15 teams from Serie B and 12 Serie A teams seeded 9–20) competed in this round, 16 of which advanced to the second round.

11 August 2023	Frosinone (1)	1–0	Pisa (2)	Frosinone
17:45 CEST	Canestrelli 7' (o.g.)	Report		Stadium: Stadio Benito Stirpe; Attendance: 3,804; Referee: Davide Ghersini

11 August 2023	Udinese (1)	4–1	Catanzaro (2)	Udine
18:00 CEST	Lovrić 9'; Beto 49'; Thauvin 64' (pen.); Lucca 90+3'	Report	Vandeputte 12'	Stadium: Stadio Friuli; Attendance: 4,801; Referee: Daniele Minelli

11 August 2023	Genoa (1)	4–3	Modena (2)	Genoa
21:00 CEST	Retegui 1', 57'; Vásquez 45+3'; Guðmundsson 51'	Report	Manconi 29'; Tremolada 40'; Gargiulo 77'	Stadium: Stadio Luigi Ferraris; Attendance: 25,000; Referee: Gianluca Aureliano

11 August 2023	Bologna (1)	2–0	Cesena (3)	Bologna
21:15 CEST	Corazza 2'; Zirkzee 80'	Report		Stadium: Stadio Renato Dall'Ara; Attendance: 14,139; Referee: Gianluca Manganiello

12 August 2023	Empoli (1)	1–2	Cittadella (2)	Empoli
17:45 CEST	Caputo 8'	Report	Amatucci 61'; Magrassi 80'	Stadium: Stadio Carlo Castellani; Attendance: 1,785; Referee: Alessandro Prontera

12 August 2023	Bari (2)	0–3	Parma (2)	Bari
18:00 CEST		Report	Benedyczak 8'; Bonny 34'; Man 75'	Stadium: Stadio San Nicola; Attendance: 12,635; Referee: Francesco Fourneau

12 August 2023	Hellas Verona (1)	3–1	Ascoli (2)	Verona
21:00 CEST	Mboula 2'; Dawidowicz 45+3'; Đurić 47' (pen.)	Report	Forte 39' (pen.)	Stadium: Stadio Marcantonio Bentegodi; Attendance: 8,746; Referee: Marco Piccinini

12 August 2023	Cagliari (1)	2–1 (a.e.t.)	Palermo (2)	Cagliari
21:15 CEST	Dossena 100'; Di Pardo 120+3'	Report	Soleri 120+1'	Stadium: Unipol Domus; Attendance: 14,917; Referee: Livio Marinelli

13 August 2023	Salernitana (1)	1–0	Ternana (2)	Salerno
17:45 CEST	Candreva 7'	Report		Stadium: Stadio Arechi; Attendance: 9,248; Referee: Antonio Giua

13 August 2023	Cosenza (2)	2–5 (a.e.t.)	Sassuolo (1)	Cosenza
18:00 CEST	Tutino 9' (pen.); Mazzocchi 90'	Report	Bajrami 45+4'; Pinamonti 79' (pen.); Ceide 105'; Mulattieri 115', 118'	Stadium: Stadio San Vito-Gigi Marulla; Attendance: 8,800; Referee: Giuseppe Collu

13 August 2023	Lecce (1)	1–0	Como (2)	Lecce
21:00 CEST	Almqvist 27'	Report		Stadium: Stadio Via del mare Attendance: 14,174; Referee: Daniele Rutella

13 August 2023	Monza (1)	1–2	Reggiana (2)	Monza
21:15 CEST	D'Ambrosio 22'	Report	Nardi 64'; Cigarini 84' (pen.)	Stadium: Stadio Brianteo; Attendance: 8,178; Referee: Alberto Santoro

14 August 2023	Cremonese (2)	3–1 (a.e.t.)	Crotone (3)	Cremona
17:45 CEST	Afena-Gyan 30'; Vázquez 105'; Pickel 117'	Report	Tumminello 7'	Stadium: Stadio Giovanni Zini; Attendance: 3,372; Referee: Luca Zufferli

14 August 2023	Sampdoria (2)	1–1 (a.e.t.) (7–6 p)	Südtirol (2)	Genoa
18:00 CEST	Léris 17'	Report	Casiraghi 45+4'	Stadium: Stadio Luigi Ferraris; Attendance: 10,948; Referee: Kevin Bonacina
	Penalties
	Stoppa (penalty scored); De Luca (penalty scored); Pedrola (penalty scored); Depaoli (penalty missed); Vieira (penalty scored); Bereszyński (penalty scored); Benedetti (penalty scored); Murru (penalty scored)		(penalty scored) Cagnano; (penalty scored) Lonardi; (penalty scored) Ciervo; (penalty scored) Cisco; (penalty missed) Broh; (penalty scored) Davì; (penalty scored) Tait; (penalty missed) Masiello

14 August 2023	Spezia (2)	2–2 (a.e.t.) (4–3 p)	Venezia (2)	Cesena
21:00 CEST	Antonucci 19'; Moro 60' (pen.)	Report	Pohjanpalo 54'; Gytkjaer 81' (pen.)	Stadium: Stadio Dino Manuzzi; Attendance: 626; Referee: Niccolò Baroni
	Penalties
	Krollis (penalty scored); F. Esposito (penalty missed); S. Esposito (penalty scored); Kouda (penalty scored); Bastoni (penalty scored)		(penalty missed) Pohjanpalo; (penalty scored) Cheryshev; (penalty scored) Gytkjaer; (penalty scored) Busio; (penalty missed) Zampano

14 August 2023	Torino (1)	2–1	Feralpisalò (2)	Turin
21:15 CEST	Vojvoda 22'; Ilić 85'	Report	Di Molfetta 17'	Stadium: Stadio Olimpico Grande Torino; Attendance: 9,067; Referee: Paride Tremolada

=== Second round ===
The sixteen winning teams from the first round competed in the second round, eight of which advanced to the round of 16.

31 October 2023	Cremonese (2)	2–1 (a.e.t.)	Cittadella (2)	Cremona
15:00 CET	Bertolacci 48'; Coda 120+1'	Report	Vita 83'	Stadium: Stadio Giovanni Zini; Attendance: 1,669; Referee: Paride Tremolada

31 October 2023	Salernitana (1)	4–0	Sampdoria (2)	Salerno
18:00 CET	Ikwuemesi 28'; Tchaouna 45+1', 67'; Cabral 86'	Report		Stadium: Stadio Arechi; Attendance: 4,740; Referee: Gianluca Manganiello

31 October 2023	Bologna (1)	2–0	Hellas Verona (1)	Bologna
21:00 CET	Moro 41'; Van Hooijdonk 62'	Report		Stadium: Stadio Renato Dall'Ara; Attendance: 11,593; Referee: Federico Dionisi

1 November 2023	Genoa (1)	2–1 (a.e.t.)	Reggiana (2)	Genoa
15:00 CET	Haps 53'; Guðmundsson 99'	Report	Djamanca 37'	Stadium: Stadio Luigi Ferraris; Attendance: 12,427; Referee: Alberto Santoro

1 November 2023	Lecce (1)	2–4	Parma (2)	Lecce
18:00 CET	Piccoli 54'; Strefezza 76'	Report	Sohm 9'; Bonny 26'; Pongračić 90+4' (o.g.); Man 90+7' (pen.)	Stadium: Stadio Via del mare Attendance: 6,654; Referee: Daniele Minelli

1 November 2023	Udinese (1)	1–2 (a.e.t.)	Cagliari (1)	Udine
21:00 CET	Guessand 63'	Report	Viola 80'; Lapadula 120'	Stadium: Stadio Friuli; Attendance: 4,537; Referee: Francesco Cosso

2 November 2023	Sassuolo (1)	0–0 (a.e.t.) (5–4 p)	Spezia (2)	Reggio Emilia
18:00 CET		Report		Stadium: Mapei Stadium; Attendance: 2,013; Referee: Luca Zufferli
	Penalties
	Berardi (penalty scored); Pinamonti (penalty scored); Bajrami (penalty scored); Thorstvedt (penalty scored); Laurienté (penalty scored)		(penalty scored) Kouda; (penalty missed) Moro; (penalty scored) Candelari; (penalty scored) Nikolaou; (penalty scored) Esposito

2 November 2023	Torino (1)	1–2 (a.e.t.)	Frosinone (1)	Turin
21:00 CET	Zima 31'	Report	Ibrahimović 5'; Reinier 98'	Stadium: Stadio Olimpico Grande Torino; Attendance: 5,233; Referee: Francesco Fourneau

== Final stage ==
=== Bracket ===
Round of 16
Fiorentina (p)	2 (4)
Parma	2 (1)
Internazionale	1
Bologna (a.e.t.)	2
Milan	4
Cagliari	1
Atalanta	3
Sassuolo	1
Juventus	6
Salernitana	1
Napoli	0
Frosinone	4
Lazio	1
Genoa	0
Roma	2
Cremonese	1

Quarter-finals
Fiorentina (p)	0 (5)
Bologna	0 (4)
Milan	1
Atalanta	2
Juventus	4
Frosinone	0
Lazio	1
Roma	0

Semi-finals
Fiorentina	1	1	2
Atalanta	0	4	4
Juventus	2	1	3
Lazio	0	2	2

Final
Atalanta	0
Juventus	1

=== Round of 16 ===
The round of 16 matches were played between the eight winners from the second round and clubs seeded 1–8 in the 2022–23 Serie A.

5 December 2023	Lazio (1)	1–0	Genoa (1)	Rome
21:00 CET	Guendouzi 5'	Report		Stadium: Stadio Olimpico; Attendance: 38,012; Referee: Juan Luca Sacchi

6 December 2023	Fiorentina (1)	2–2 (a.e.t.) (4–1 p)	Parma (2)	Florence
21:00 CET	Nzola 83'; Sottil 90' (pen.)	Report	Bernabé 21'; Bonny 23'	Stadium: Stadio Artemio Franchi; Attendance: 23,113; Referee: Livio Marinelli
	Penalties
	Biraghi (penalty scored); Kouamé (penalty scored); Milenković (penalty scored); Beltrán (penalty scored)		(penalty scored) Hernani; (penalty missed) Man; (penalty missed) Camara

19 December 2023	Napoli (1)	0–4	Frosinone (1)	Naples
21:00 CET		Report	Barrenechea 65'; Caso 70'; Cheddira 90+1' (pen.); Harroui 90+5'	Stadium: Stadio Diego Armando Maradona; Attendance: 25,000; Referee: Rosario Abisso

20 December 2023	Internazionale (1)	1–2 (a.e.t.)	Bologna (1)	Milan
21:00 CET	Carlos Augusto 92'	Report	Beukema 112'; Ndoye 116'	Stadium: San Siro; Attendance: 63,519; Referee: Federico La Penna

2 January 2024	Milan (1)	4–1	Cagliari (1)	Milan
21:00 CET	Jović 29', 42'; Traorè 50'; Leão 90+1'	Report	Azzi 87'	Stadium: San Siro; Attendance: 57,169; Referee: Alessandro Prontera

3 January 2024	Atalanta (1)	3–1	Sassuolo (1)	Bergamo
18:00 CET	De Ketelaere 24', 63'; Miranchuk 71'	Report	Boloca 90+5'	Stadium: Gewiss Stadium; Attendance: 13,509; Referee: Alberto Santoro

3 January 2024	Roma (1)	2–1	Cremonese (2)	Rome
21:00 CET	Lukaku 77'; Dybala 85' (pen.)	Report	Tsadjout 37'	Stadium: Stadio Olimpico; Attendance: 61,975; Referee: Luca Pairetto

4 January 2024	Juventus (1)	6–1	Salernitana (1)	Turin
21:00 CET	Miretti 12'; Cambiaso 35'; Rugani 54'; Bronn 75' (o.g.); Yıldız 88'; Weah 90+1'	Report	Ikwuemesi 1'	Stadium: Juventus Stadium; Attendance: 40,548; Referee: Davide Ghersini

=== Quarter-finals ===
The quarter-final matches were played between clubs advancing from the round of 16.

9 January 2024	Fiorentina (1)	0–0 (a.e.t.) (5–4 p)	Bologna (1)	Florence
21:00 CET		Report		Stadium: Stadio Artemio Franchi; Attendance: 25,079; Referee: Matteo Marchetti
	Penalties
	Mandragora (penalty scored); Arthur (penalty scored); Milenković (penalty scored); Mina (penalty scored); Lopez (penalty scored)		(penalty scored) Ferguson; (penalty scored) Zirkzee; (penalty scored) Orsolini; (penalty scored) Calafiori; (penalty missed) Posch

10 January 2024	Lazio (1)	1–0	Roma (1)	Rome
18:00 CET	Zaccagni 51' (pen.)	Report		Stadium: Stadio Olimpico; Attendance: 51,880; Referee: Daniele Orsato

10 January 2024	Milan (1)	1–2	Atalanta (1)	Milan
21:00 CET	Leão 45'	Report	Koopmeiners 45+2', 59' (pen.)	Stadium: San Siro; Attendance: 64,036; Referee: Marco Di Bello

11 January 2024	Juventus (1)	4–0	Frosinone (1)	Turin
21:00 CET	Milik 11' (pen.), 38', 48'; Yıldız 61'	Report		Stadium: Juventus Stadium; Attendance: 37,940; Referee: Juan Luca Sacchi

=== Semi-finals ===
The two-legged semi-finals were played between clubs advancing from the quarter-finals.

==== First leg ====
2 April 2024	Juventus (1)	2–0	Lazio (1)	Turin
21:00 CEST	Chiesa 50'; Vlahović 64'	Report		Stadium: Juventus Stadium; Attendance: 39,056; Referee: Davide Massa

3 April 2024	Fiorentina (1)	1–0	Atalanta (1)	Florence
21:00 CEST	Mandragora 31'	Report		Stadium: Stadio Artemio Franchi; Attendance: 21,560; Referee: Maurizio Mariani

==== Second leg ====
23 April 2024	Lazio (1)	2–1 (2–3 agg.)	Juventus (1)	Rome
21:00 CEST	Castellanos 12', 48'	Report	Milik 83'	Stadium: Stadio Olimpico; Attendance: 40,076; Referee: Daniele Orsato

24 April 2024	Atalanta (1)	4–1 (4–2 agg.)	Fiorentina (1)	Bergamo
21:00 CEST	Koopmeiners 8'; Scamacca 75'; Lookman 90+5'; Pašalić 90+8'	Report	Martínez Quarta 68'	Stadium: Gewiss Stadium; Attendance: 14,909; Referee: Federico La Penna

=== Final ===
15 May 2024
21:00 CEST

Atalanta	0–1	Juventus
	Report	Vlahović 4'

Stadio Olimpico, Rome
Attendance: 66,854
Referee: Fabio Maresca

== Top goalscorers ==
Rank	Player	Club	Goals
1	(Poland) Arkadiusz Milik	Juventus	4
2	(France) Ange-Yoan Bonny	Parma	3
2	(Netherlands) Teun Koopmeiners	Atalanta	3
4	(Argentina) Taty Castellanos	Lazio	2
4	(Belgium) Charles De Ketelaere	Atalanta	2
4	(Italy) Davide Di Molfetta	Feralpisalò	2
4	(Iceland) Albert Guðmundsson	Genoa	2
4	(Nigeria) Chukwubuikem Ikwuemesi	Salernitana	2
4	(Serbia) Luka Jović	Milan	2
4	(Italy) Eric Lanini	Reggiana	2
4	(Portugal) Rafael Leão	Milan	2
4	(Romania) Dennis Man	Parma	2
4	(Italy) Lorenzo Meazzi	Virtus Entella	2
4	(Italy) Samuele Mulattieri	Sassuolo	2
4	(Italy) Manolo Portanova	Reggiana	2
4	(Italy) Mateo Retegui	Genoa	2
4	(France) Loum Tchaouna	Salernitana	2
4	(Serbia) Dušan Vlahović	Juventus	2
4	(Turkey) Kenan Yıldız	Juventus	2
