= 2022–23 Cesena FC season =

Cesena F.C.
2022–23 season
- Chairman: Robert Lewis; John Aiello
- Manager: Domenico Toscano
- Stadium: Stadio Dino Manuzzi
- Serie C: 2nd
- Coppa Italia Serie C: Second round
- Top goalscorer: League: Simone Corazza (17); All: Simone Corazza (17)
- Highest home attendance: 17,130 vs Reggiana
- Lowest home attendance: 694 vs Fermana
- Average home league attendance: 8,912

The 2022–23 Cesena F.C. season was the club's 83rd season in existence and its third consecutive season in the top flight of Italian football. In addition to the domestic league, Cesena participated in this season's edition of the Coppa Italia Serie C. The season covered the period from 1 July 2022 to 30 June 2023.

== Players ==
As of 19 January 2023.

Note: Flags indicate national team as defined under FIFA eligibility rules; some limited exceptions apply. Players may hold more than one non-FIFA nationality.

No.	Pos.	Nation	Player
1	GK	ITA	Andrea Tozzo
3	DF	ITA	Mario Mercadante
5	DF	ITA	Luca Coccolo
6	MF	FRA	Jonathan Bumbu
7	FW	ITA	Giacomo Zecca
8	MF	ITA	Saber Hraiech
9	FW	ITA	Alexis Ferrante (on loan from Ternana)
10	MF	ITA	Riccardo Chiarello
11	FW	ALB	Stiven Shpendi
14	DF	ITA	Daniele Celiento (on loan from Bari)
15	DF	ITA	Andrea Ciofi
16	DF	ITA	Alessandro Albertini
17	MF	ITA	Emanuele Adamo
18	FW	ITA	Simone Corazza

No.	Pos.	Nation	Player
19	DF	ITA	Giuseppe Prestia
20	MF	ITA	Francesco De Rose
23	FW	ITA	Mattia Mustacchio (on loan from Pro Vercelli)
24	MF	ITA	Nicolò Bianchi
27	DF	ITA	Marco Calderoni
28	DF	ITA	Luigi Silvestri
31	FW	ITA	King Udoh
32	FW	ALB	Cristian Shpendi
44	GK	USA	Luca Lewis
73	DF	ITA	Simone Pieraccini
77	MF	ITA	Alessio Brambilla
88	MF	ITA	Matteo Francesconi
97	GK	ITA	Lorenzo Pollini
98	DF	ITA	Tomas Lepri

=== Out on loan ===
Note: Flags indicate national team as defined under FIFA eligibility rules; some limited exceptions apply. Players may hold more than one non-FIFA nationality.

No.	Pos.	Nation	Player
—	GK	ITA	Stefano Minelli (at Südtirol until 30 June 2023)
—	DF	ITA	Pietro Guerra (at Forlì until 30 June 2023)
—	DF	CRO	Ivan Kontek (at Foggia until 30 June 2023)

No.	Pos.	Nation	Player
—	MF	ITA	Tommaso Berti (at Fiorentina U19 until 30 June 2023)
—	MF	ITA	Giovanni Nannelli (at Fermana until 30 June 2023)
—	FW	ITA	Filippo Pittarello (at Feralpisalò until 30 June 2023)

== Competitions ==
=== Overview ===
Competition	First match	Last match	Starting round	Final position	Record							
Competition	First match	Last match	Starting round	Final position	Pld	W	D	L	GF	GA	GD	Win %
Serie C	4 September 2022	23 April 2023	Matchday 1	2nd	38	23	10	5	66	24	+42	60.53
Serie C National play-offs	27 May 2023		Second round		3	1	2	0	2	1	+1	33.33
Coppa Italia Serie C	5 October 2022	1 November 2022	First round	Second round	2	1	0	1	4	3	+1	50.00
Total					43	25	12	6	72	28	+44	58.14

Source: Soccerway

=== Serie C ===
==== League table ====
Pos	Team	Pld	W	D	L	GF	GA	GD	Pts	Qualification
1	Reggiana (C, P)	38	24	9	5	63	27	+36	81	Promotion to Serie B. Qualification for the Supercoppa di Serie C
2	Cesena	38	23	10	5	66	24	+42	79 (Note: Cesena ahead of Virtus Entella due to head-to-head matches: ENT-CES 0-0; CES-ENT 4-0)	Qualification for the promotion play-offs national phase
3	Virtus Entella	38	23	10	5	60	31	+29	79	Qualification for the promotion play-offs national phase
4	Carrarese	38	18	8	12	51	42	+9	62	Qualification for the promotion play-offs group phase
5	Gubbio	38	17	10	11	50	34	+16	61	Qualification for the promotion play-offs group phase

Updated to match(es) played on 6 April 2023. Source: Lega Pro, Soccerway (in English)
Rules for classification: 1) Points; 2) Head-to-head points; 3) Head-to-head goal difference; 4) Goal difference; 5) Goals scored; 6) Lower goals against; 7) Wins; 8) Lower losses; 9) Away wins; 10) Lower home losses.
(C) Champions; (P) Promoted

==== Results summary ====
Overall								Home						Away					
Pld	W	D	L	GF	GA	GD	Pts	W	D	L	GF	GA	GD	W	D	L	GF	GA	GD
38	23	10	5	66	24	+42	79	11	5	3	37	15	+22	12	5	2	29	9	+20

==== Results by round ====
Round	1	2	3	4	5	6	7	8	9	10	11	12	13	14	15	16	17	18	19	20	21	22	23	24	25	26	27	28	29	30	31	32	33	34	35	36	37	38
Ground	H	A	H	A	H	H	A	H	A	H	A	H	A	H	A	A	H	A	H	A	H	A	H	A	A	H	A	H	A	H	A	H	A	H	H	A	H	A
Result	L	W	D	L	D	W	D	W	W	W	W	W	D	L	W	L	W	W	W	D	W	W	D	W	W	W	W	L	D	D	D	W	W	W	D	W	W	W
Position																																						

A = Away; H = Home; W = Win; D = Draw; L = Loss

==== Matches ====
4 September 2022 1	Cesena	1–2	Carrarese	Cesena
CEST (UTC+2)				Stadium: Stadio Dino Manuzzi

11 September 2022 2	Rimini	0–1	Cesena	Rimini
CEST (UTC+2)

14 September 2022 3	Cesena	1–1	Torres	Cesena
CEST (UTC+2)				Stadium: Stadio Dino Manuzzi

18 September 2022 4	Fermana	2–0	Cesena	Fermo
CEST (UTC+2)

24 September 2022 5	Cesena	1–1	Pontedera	Cesena
CEST (UTC+2)				Stadium: Stadio Dino Manuzzi

2 October 2022 6	Cesena	2–0	Recanatese	Cesena
CEST (UTC+2)				Stadium: Stadio Dino Manuzzi

10 October 2022 7	Siena	0–0	Cesena	Siena
CEST (UTC+2)

16 October 2022 8	Cesena	4–0	Imolese	Cesena
CEST (UTC+2)				Stadium: Stadio Dino Manuzzi

19 October 2022 9	Reggiana	0–1	Cesena	Reggio Emilia
CEST (UTC+2)

23 October 2022 10	Cesena	2–1	Fiorenzuola	Cesena
CEST (UTC+2)				Stadium: Stadio Dino Manuzzi

29 October 2022 11	Montevarchi Calcio	0–3	Cesena	Montevarchi
CEST (UTC+2)

5 November 2022 12	Cesena	3–0	Gubbio	Cesena
CET (UTC+1)				Stadium: Stadio Dino Manuzzi

5 March 2023 30	Cesena	2–2	Montevarchi Calcio	Cesena
CET (UTC+1)				Stadium: Stadio Dino Manuzzi

11 March 2023 31	Gubbio	1–1	Cesena	Gubbio
CET (UTC+1)

14 March 2023 32	Cesena	4–0	Virtus Entella	Cesena
CET (UTC+1)				Stadium: Stadio Dino Manuzzi

20 March 2023 33	Ancona	0–1	Cesena	Ancona
CET (UTC+1)

26 March 2023 34	Cesena	1–0	Olbia	Cesena
CEST (UTC+2)				Stadium: Stadio Dino Manuzzi

1 April 2023 35	Cesena	1–1	Lucchese	Cesena
CEST (UTC+2)				Stadium: Stadio Dino Manuzzi

6 April 2023 36	San Donato Tavarnelle	1–6	Cesena	Tavarnelle Val di Pesa
20:30 CEST (UTC+2)

15 April 2023 37	Cesena	2–0	Vis Pesaro	Cesena
CEST (UTC+2)				Stadium: Stadio Dino Manuzzi

23 April 2023 38	Alessandria	0–1	Cesena	Alessandria
CEST (UTC+2)

=== Coppa Italia Serie C ===
5 October 2022 First round	Cesena	3–1	Fermana	Cesena
15:00 CET (UTC+1)		Report		Stadium: Stadio Dino Manuzzi

1 November 2022 Second round	Rimini	2–1	Cesena	Rimini
15:30 CET (UTC+1)		Report		Stadium: Stadio Romeo Neri
