= 2021–22 US Alessandria Calcio 1912 season =

Alessandria
2021–22 season
- Chairman: Luca Di Masi
- Manager: Moreno Longo
- Stadium: Stadio Giuseppe Moccagatta
- Serie B: 18th (relegated)
- Coppa Italia: First round
- Top goalscorer: League: Simone Corazza (12); All: Simone Corazza (14)
Home colours	Away colours

The 2021–22 season was U.S. Alessandria Calcio 1912's first season back in second division of the Italian football league, the Serie B, and the 110th as a football club.

== Players ==
=== First-team squad ===
As of 25 February 2022

Note: Flags indicate national team as defined under FIFA eligibility rules; some limited exceptions apply. Players may hold more than one non-FIFA nationality.

No.	Pos.	Nation	Player
1	GK	ITA	Lorenzo Crisanto
3	DF	ITA	Luca Coccolo (on loan from Juventus)
4	DF	ITA	Riccardo Chiarello
5	MF	ITA	Mirko Gori (on loan from Frosinone)
6	MF	FRA	Abou Ba (on loan from Nantes)
7	MF	ITA	Luca Parodi
8	FW	ITA	Gabriel Lunetta (on loan from Atalanta)
10	FW	ITA	Michele Marconi
11	DF	ITA	Federico Mattiello (on loan from Atalanta)
12	GK	ITA	Matteo Pisseri
13	DF	ITA	Simone Benedetti
14	DF	ITA	Andrea Beghetto (on loan from Pisa)
15	DF	ITA	Lorenzo Ariaudo
16	FW	ITA	Diego Fabbrini (on loan from Ascoli)
17	MF	ITA	Mattia Mustacchio

No.	Pos.	Nation	Player
18	FW	ITA	Simone Corazza
19	DF	ITA	Giuseppe Prestia
20	FW	ITA	Francesco Orlando (on loan from Salernitana)
21	MF	ITA	Federico Casarini
22	GK	ITA	Michele Cerofolini (on loan from Fiorentina)
23	MF	ITA	Antonino Barillà
25	DF	ITA	Edoardo Pierozzi
26	MF	ITA	Andrea Palazzi
29	FW	ITA	Simone Palombi
30	DF	ITA	Matteo Di Gennaro
31	DF	ITA	Gabriele Bellodi (on loan from Milan)
37	FW	ALB	Andrea Filipi
44	DF	ITA	Valerio Mantovani (on loan from Salernitana)
62	MF	ITA	Tommaso Milanese (on loan from Roma)
72	FW	ALB	Aristidi Kolaj

=== Out on loan ===
As of 31 January 2022

Note: Flags indicate national team as defined under FIFA eligibility rules; some limited exceptions apply. Players may hold more than one non-FIFA nationality.

No.	Pos.	Nation	Player
—	DF	ITA	Simone Sini (at Renate until 30 June 2022)
—	MF	ITA	Francesco Giorno (at Triestina until 30 June 2022)

No.	Pos.	Nation	Player
—	FW	ITA	Nicolò Poppa (at Chieri until 30 June 2022)
—	FW	ITA	Umberto Eusepi (at Juve Stabia until 30 June 2022)

== Pre-season and friendlies ==
Win Draw Loss Fixtures

11 August 2021 Friendly	Atalanta (Italy)	7–1	(Italy) Alessandria	Bergamo, Italy
17:00 CEST (UTC+2)	Scalvini 13'; Iličić 20', 44'; Pašalić 30'; Muriel 51' (pen.); Gosens 56'; Tolói 82'		Arrighini 43'	Stadium: Gewiss Stadium; Referee: Simone Sozza

4 September 2021 Friendly	Alessandria (Italy)	3–2	(Italy) Genoa	Alessandria, Italy
15:00 CEST (UTC+2)	Corazza 4'; Palombi 13', 19'		Criscito 21'; Destro 81'	Stadium: Stadio Giuseppe Moccagatta

== Competitions ==
=== Overall record ===
Competition	First match	Last match	Starting round	Final position	Record							
Competition	First match	Last match	Starting round	Final position	Pld	W	D	L	GF	GA	GD	Win %
Serie B	21 August 2021	6 May 2022	Matchday 1	18th	38	8	10	20	37	59	−22	21.05
Coppa Italia	8 August 2021	16 August 2021	Preliminary round	First round	2	1	0	1	4	3	+1	50.00
Total					40	9	10	21	41	62	−21	22.50

Source: Soccerway

=== Serie B ===
==== League table ====
Pos	Team	Pld	W	D	L	GF	GA	GD	Pts	Promotion, qualification or relegation
16	Cosenza	38	8	11	19	36	59	−23	35	Relegation play-out
17	Vicenza (R)	38	9	7	22	38	59	−21	34 (Note: Vicenza finished ahead of Alessandria on head-to-head points: Vicenza 2–1 Alessandria, Alessandria 0–1 Vicenza.)	Relegation play-out
18	Alessandria (R)	38	8	10	20	37	59	−22	34	Relegation to Serie C
19	Crotone (R)	38	4	14	20	41	61	−20	26	Relegation to Serie C
20	Pordenone (R)	38	3	9	26	29	71	−42	18	Relegation to Serie C

Source: Lega Serie B (in Italian), Soccerway (in English)
Rules for classification: 1) Points; 2) Head-to-head points; 3) Head-to-head goal difference; 4) Goal difference; 5) Goals scored; 6) Draw.
(R) Relegated

==== Results summary ====
Overall								Home						Away					
Pld	W	D	L	GF	GA	GD	Pts	W	D	L	GF	GA	GD	W	D	L	GF	GA	GD
38	8	10	20	37	59	−22	34	5	6	8	16	23	−7	3	4	12	21	36	−15

Source: Serie B

==== Results by round ====
Round	1	2	3	4	5	6	7	8	9	10	11	12	13	14	15	16	17	18	19	20	21	22	23	24	25	26	27	28	29	30	31	32	33	34	35	36	37	38
Ground	A	A	H	A	H	A	H	A	H	H	A	H	A	H	A	H	A	H	A	H	H	A	H	A	H	A	H	A	A	H	A	H	A	H	A	H	A	H
Result	L	L	L	L	L	D	W	L	W	D	L	L	W	W	L	L	W	L	L	W	D	D	D	L	L	L	D	D	L	L	L	D	L	W	W	D	D	L
Position	14	16	18	18	20	18	18	18	18	17	17	18	17	17	17	17	16	16	16	16	16	16	15	16	16	16	16	16	16	16	16	16	16	16	16	16	16	18

Source: Serie B
A = Away; H = Home; W = Win; D = Draw; L = Loss

==== Matches ====
The league fixtures were announced on 24 July 2021.

22 August 2021 1	Benevento	4–3	Alessandria	Benevento
20:30 CET	Insigne 23' (pen.); Improta (yellow card) 34' (goal) 55'; Parodi 45' (o.g.); Foulon 48'; Elia (yellow card) 71'; Acampora (yellow card) 88'	Report	Corazza 6' 40' 83' (pen.); Benedetti (yellow card) 14'; Ba (yellow card) 33'; Pierozzi (yellow card) 90+1'; Parodi (yellow card) 90+6'	Stadium: Stadio Ciro Vigorito; Attendance: 2,869; Referee: (Italy) Marco Di Bello

27 November 2021 14	Alessandria	1–0	Cremonese	Alessandria
14:00 CET	Parodi (yellow card) 6'; Arrighini (yellow card) 44'; Mustacchio 49'; Corazza (yellow card) 63'; Chiarello (yellow card) 75'; Benedetti (yellow card) 87'	Report	Valeri (yellow card) 27'	Stadium: Stadio Giuseppe Moccagatta; Attendance: 2,290; Referee: (Italy) Manuel Volpi

=== Coppa Italia ===
8 August 2021 Preliminary round	Padova	0–2 (a.e.t.)	Alessandria	Padova
20:30 CEST		Report	Corazza 102'; Orlando 106'	Stadium: Stadio Euganeo; Attendance: 401; Referee: Daniele Minelli

16 August 2021 First round	Sampdoria	3–2	Alessandria	Genoa
21:00 CEST (UTC+2)	Quagliarella 28'; Gabbiadini 47'; Thorsby 52'; Murillo (yellow card) 72'; Chabot (yellow card) 89'	Report	Chiarello 8'; Ba (yellow card) 23'; Casarini (yellow card) 42'; Corazza 45' (pen.); Benedetti (yellow card) 65' (yellow-red card) 84'	Stadium: Stadio Luigi Ferraris; Attendance: 1,249; Referee: Andrea Colombo
