= DeLucia =

DeLucia, De Lucia or de Lucia is the surname of the following people:

- Dylan DeLucia (born 2000), American baseball player
- Fernando De Lucia (1860–1925), Italian opera tenor and singing teacher
- Jason DeLucia (born 1969), American mixed martial artist
- Paco de Lucía (1947–2014), Spanish flamenco guitarist and composer
- Pepe de Lucía (born 1945), Spanish flamenco singer and songwriter, brother of Paco
- Rich DeLucia (born 1964), American baseball player
- Victor De Lucia (born 1996), Italian football player
