= Marco Curto =

Italian footballer

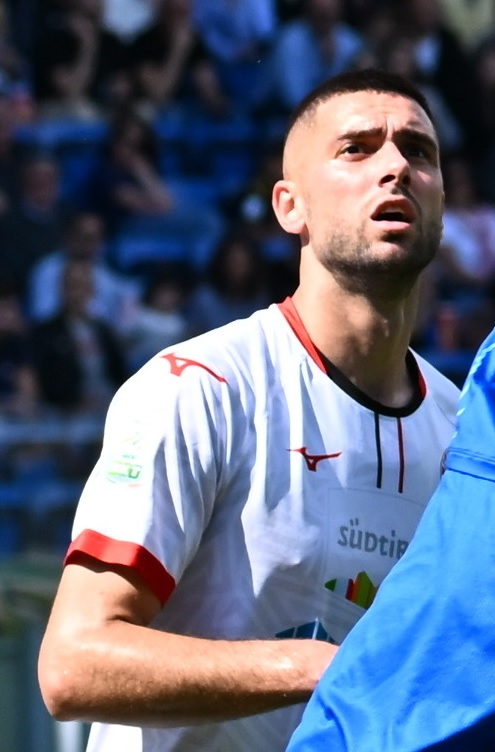
- Curto in 2023

Personal information
- Date of birth: 5 January 1999 (age 27)
- Place of birth: Naples, Italy
- Height: 1.91 m (6 ft 3 in)
- Position: Centre back

Team information
- Current team: Empoli
- Number: 2

Youth career
- 2012–2013: Benevento
- 2013–2017: AC Milan
- 2017–2018: Empoli

Senior career*
Years	Team	Apps	(Gls)
2018–2020	Empoli	0	(0)
2018–2019	→ Reggina (loan)	0	(0)
2019–2020	→ Virtus Verona (loan)	18	(0)
2020–2024	Südtirol	95	(3)
2023–2024	→ Como (loan)	25	(0)
2024–2025	Como	0	(0)
2024–2025	→ Cesena (loan)	12	(2)
2025	→ Sampdoria (loan)	14	(0)
2025–	Empoli	15	(0)

International career
2014	Italy U15	5	(0)
2014	Italy U16	1	(0)
- * Club domestic league appearances and goals as of 13 May 2026

Marco Curto (born 5 January 1999) is an Italian professional footballer who plays as a centre back for Serie B club Empoli.

== Club career ==
Born in Naples, Curto started his youth career in Benevento's academy, then he joined AC Milan's youth academy in 2013, and later joined Empoli on 3 July 2017.

On 11 January 2019, he was loaned to Reggina.

On 18 August 2020, he joined Virtus Verona on loan. He made his professional debut on 25 August 2019 against Calcio Padova.

On 18 August 2020, he signed with Südtirol.

On 8 August 2023, Curto joined Como on loan with a conditional obligation to buy.

On 23 July 2024, Curto was loaned by Cesena from Como, with an option to buy.

On 7 October 2024, Curto was given a 10-match ban by FIFA, with five them of them suspended, for racially abusing Wolverhampton Wanderers forward Hwang Hee-chan in a pre-season friendly.

On 24 January 2025, Curto moved on a new loan to Sampdoria, with an option to buy. He signed a contract with Sampdoria until 2028 that would have been in place if the option was exercised. It was not.

On 25 July 2025, Curto signed with Empoli in Serie B.

== Career statistics ==
As of match played 6 April 2025

Appearances and goals by club, season and competition
Club	Season	League			National cup		Continental		Other		Total	
Club	Season	Division	Apps	Goals	Apps	Goals	Apps	Goals	Apps	Goals	Apps	Goals
Empoli	2017–18	Serie B	0	0	—		—		—		0	0
Empoli	2018–19	Serie A	0	0	—		—		—		0	0
Empoli	Total		0	0	—		—		—		0	0
Reggina (loan)	2018–19	Serie C	0	0	0	0	—		—		0	0
Virtus Verona (loan)	2019–20	Serie C	19	0	2 (Note: Appearances in Coppa Italia Serie C)	0	—		—		21	0
Südtirol	2020–21	Serie C	31	0	1	0	—		3 (Note: Appearances in Serie C – Promotion play-offs)	0	35	0
Südtirol	2021–22	Serie C	30	1	7 (Note: Six appearances in Coppa Italia Serie C, one appearance in Coppa Italia)	0	—		1 (Note: Appearance in Supercoppa di Serie C)	0	38	1
Südtirol	2022–23	Serie B	34	2	1	0	—		3 (Note: Appearances in Serie B – Promotion play-offs)	0	38	2
Südtirol	Total		95	3	9	0	—		7	0	111	3
Como (loan)	2023–24	Serie B	25	0	0	0	—		—		25	0
Cesena (loan)	2024–25	Serie B	12	2	3	0	—		—		15	0
Sampdoria (loan)	2024–25	Serie B	9	0	—		—		—		9	0
Career total			160	5	12	0	0	0	7	0	179	5

== Honours ==
Südtirol

- Serie C: 2021–22
- Coppa Italia Serie C: 2021–22
