= Nannelli =

Nannelli is a surname. Notable people with the surname include:

- Gianluca Nannelli (born 1973), Italian motorcycle racer
- Giovanni Nannelli (born 2000), Italian footballer
