= Ciofi =

Ciofi is an Italian surname. Notable people with the surname include:

- Patrizia Ciofi (born 1967), Italian operatic coloratura soprano
- Andrea Ciofi (born 1999), Italian footballer
