= Antonio David (footballer, born 2004) =

Romanian footballer (born 2004)

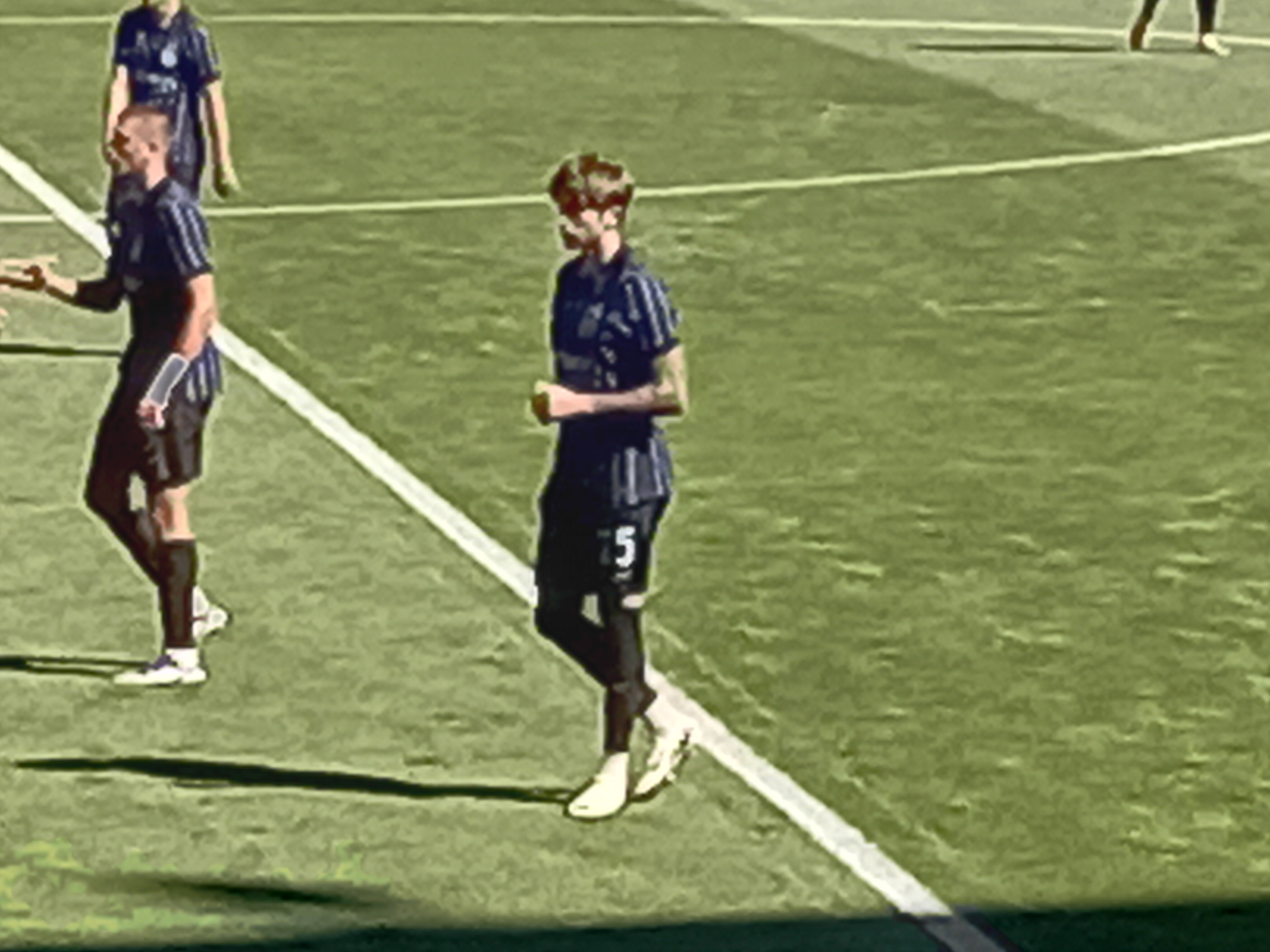

Personal information
- Date of birth: 8 January 2004 (age 22)
- Place of birth: Ravenna, Italy
- Height: 1.84 m (6 ft 0 in)
- Position: Left-back

Team information
- Current team: Cesena
- Number: 3

Youth career
- 2009–2014: Del Duca Grama
- 2014–2023: Cesena

Senior career*
Years	Team	Apps	(Gls)
2023–	Cesena	19	(0)
2024–2025	→ Gubbio (loan)	26	(0)
2025–2026	→ Inter Milan U23 (loan)	22	(0)

International career^{‡}
2024–2025	Romania U20	5	(0)
2025	Romania U21	2	(0)
- * Club domestic league appearances and goals as of 6 September 2026 ‡ National team caps and goals as of 10 October 2025

Antonio David (born 8 January 2004) is a professional footballer who plays as a left-back for Serie B club Cesena. Born in Italy, he represents Romania at youth level.

== Club career ==
=== Cesena ===
David began his career at Del Duca Grama before joining Cesena's youth setup at the age of 10. On 6 April 2023, he made his professional debut in Serie C, coming on as a substitute in a 6–1 victory over San Donato Tavarnelle.

In the 2023–24 season, now part of the first team, David made 18 appearances across all competitions. He helped Cesena secure promotion to Serie B by winning Group B.

==== Loan to Gubbio ====
On 23 July 2024, David joined Serie C side Gubbio on loan.

==== Loan to Inter Milan U23 ====
On 13 August 2025, David joined Inter Milan U23, Inter Milan's reserve team, on a season-long loan with an option to make the transfer permanent.

== International career ==
David was born in Ravenna, Italy, to Romanian parents, giving him the eligibility to represent either country. In 2024, he received his first call-up to Romania's under-20 squad.

== Career statistics ==
=== Club ===
As of match played 6 September 2026

Appearances and goals by club, season and competition
Club	Season	League			National cup (Note: Includes Coppa Italia Serie C)		Other		Total	
Club	Season	Division	Apps	Goals	Apps	Goals	Apps	Goals	Apps	Goals
Cesena	2022–23	Serie C	1	0	0	0	0	0	1	0
Cesena	2023–24	Serie C	16	0	2	0	0	0	18	0
Cesena	2026–27	Serie B	2	0	1	0	–		3	0
Cesena	Total		19	0	3	0	0	0	22	0
Gubbio (loan)	2024–25	Serie C	26	0	1	0	1 (Note: Appearance in Serie C play-offs)	0	28	0
Inter Milan U23 (loan)	2025–26	Serie C	22	0	3	1	–		25	1
Career total			67	0	7	1	1	0	75	1

== Honours ==
Cesena

- Serie C: 2023–24
- Supercoppa di Serie C: 2024
