= Simone Bastoni =

Italian footballer (born 1996)

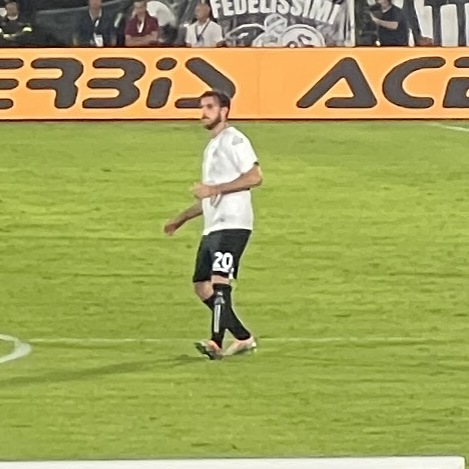
- Bastoni in 2022 with Spezia

Personal information
- Date of birth: 5 November 1996 (age 30)
- Place of birth: La Spezia, Italy
- Height: 1.81 m (5 ft 11 in)
- Position: Left-back

Team information
- Current team: Spezia
- Number: 20

Youth career
- –2014: Spezia

Senior career*
Years	Team	Apps	(Gls)
2014–2024	Spezia	82	(6)
2015–2016	→ Siena (loan)	19	(3)
2016–2017	→ Carrarese (loan)	30	(4)
2017–2018	→ Trapani (loan)	25	(1)
2019	→ Novara (loan)	16	(0)
2023–2024	→ Empoli (loan)	16	(1)
2024–2026	Cesena	62	(5)
2026–	Spezia	1	(0)

International career
2014	Italy U-18	1	(0)
2014	Italy U-19	4	(1)
- * Club domestic league appearances and goals as of 29 August 2026

Simone Bastoni (born 5 November 1996) is an Italian professional footballer who plays as a left-back for Serie C Group B club Spezia.

== Club career ==
=== Spezia ===
==== Loan to Robur Siena ====
On 20 July 2015, Bastoni was signed by Serie C side Robur Siena. On 6 September he made his Serie C debut for Siena and he scored his first professional goal in the 48th minute of a 1–1 home draw against Carrarese, he played the entire match. On 15 November, Bastoni scored his second goal for Siena in 76th minute of a 2–1 away win over Pisa. On 4 December he scored his third goal for Siena in the 84th minute of a 3–1 home win against L'Aquila. Bastoni ended his loan to Robur Siena with 19 appearances, 3 goals and 1 assist.

==== Loan to Carrarese ====
On 31 August 2016, Bastoni was loaned to Serie C side Carrarese on a season-long loan deal. On 4 September, Bastoni made his debut for Carrarese as a substitute replacing Marco Cristini in the 60th minute of a 3–1 home defeat against Arezzo. On 11 September he played his first entire match for Carrarese, a 1–0 away defeat against Livorno. On 13 November he scored his first goal for Carrarese, as a substitute, in the 80th minute of a 3–1 home win over Como. On 7 December he scored his second goal in the 8th minute of a 2–2 away draw against Pontedera. On 19 February, Bastoni scored his third goal in the 50th minute of a 3–1 away defeat against Tuttocuoio. Bastoni ended his season-long loan to Carrarese with 32 appearances, 4 goals and 3 assists.

==== Loan to Trapani ====
On 1 July 2017, Bastoni was signed by Serie C side Trapani with a season-long loan deal. On 9 September he made his debut for Trapani as a substitute replacing Antonio Palumbo in the 55th minute of a 0–0 home draw against Sicula Leonzio. On 23 October he scored his first goal for Trapani in the 29th minute of a 3–3 home draw against Catanzaro. On 11 November, Bastoni played his first full match for Trapani, a 3–3 away draw against Matera. Bastoni ended his season-long to Trapani with 27 appearances, 1 goal and 2 assists.

==== Loan to Novara ====
On 31 January 2019, Bastoni joined Novara on loan. Three days later, on 3 February he made his debut for Novara in a 0–0 home draw against Piacenza, he played the entire match. Bastoni ended his six-month loan with 16 appearances, including 14 as a starter.

==== Loan to Empoli ====
On 1 September 2023, Bastoni moved to Empoli on loan with an option to buy.

=== Cesena ===
On 26 July 2024, Bastoni signed a two-year contract with Cesena.

== International career ==
Bastoni represented Italy at Under-18 and Under-19 level, he collected a total of 5 caps and 1 goal. On 19 March 2014, Bastoni made his U-18 debut in an international friendly against Hungary U-18, he was replaced by Antonio Romano in the 67th minute of a 2–0 home win. On 16 April 2014, he made his debut at U-19 level as a substitute replacing Davide Calabria in the 62nd minute of a 4–2 away win against Switzerland U-19. On 5 September 2014, Bastoni scored his first goal at U-19 level in the 89th minute of a 5–0 away win against Slovakia U-19 in an international friendly.

== Personal life ==
On 5 January 2021, Bastoni tested positive for COVID-19.

== Career statistics ==
=== Club ===
As of match played 4 February 2026.

Appearances and goals by club, season and competition
Club	Season	League			Cup		Other		Total	
Club	Season	Division	Apps	Goals	Apps	Goals	Apps	Goals	Apps	Goals
Siena (loan)	2015–16	Serie C	19	3	0	0	—		19	3
Carrarese (loan)	2016–17	Serie C	30	4	0	0	2 (Note: All appearance(s) in Serie C play-out.)	0	32	4
Trapani (loan)	2017–18	Serie C	25	1	0	0	2 (Note: All appearance(s) in Serie C play-off.)	0	11	1
Spezia	2018–19	Serie B	3	0	1	0	—		4	0
Novara (loan)	2018–19	Serie C	13	0	—		3	0	16	0
Spezia	2019–20	Serie B	9	0	1	0	—		10	0
Spezia	2020–21	Serie A	17	1	1	0	—		18	1
Spezia	2021–22	Serie A	31	3	1	0	—		32	3
Spezia	2022–23	Serie A	19	2	1	0	—		20	2
Spezia	2023–24	Serie B	2	0	1	0	—		3	0
Spezia	Total		81	6	6	0	—		87	6
Empoli	2023–24	Serie A	16	1	0	0	—		16	1
Cesena	2024–25	Serie B	37	4	3	0	—		40	4
Cesena	2025–26	Serie B	17	1	1	0	—		18	1
Cesena	Total		54	5	4	0	—		58	5
Career total			238	20	10	0	7	0	255	20
