= Raffaele Celia =

Italian football player

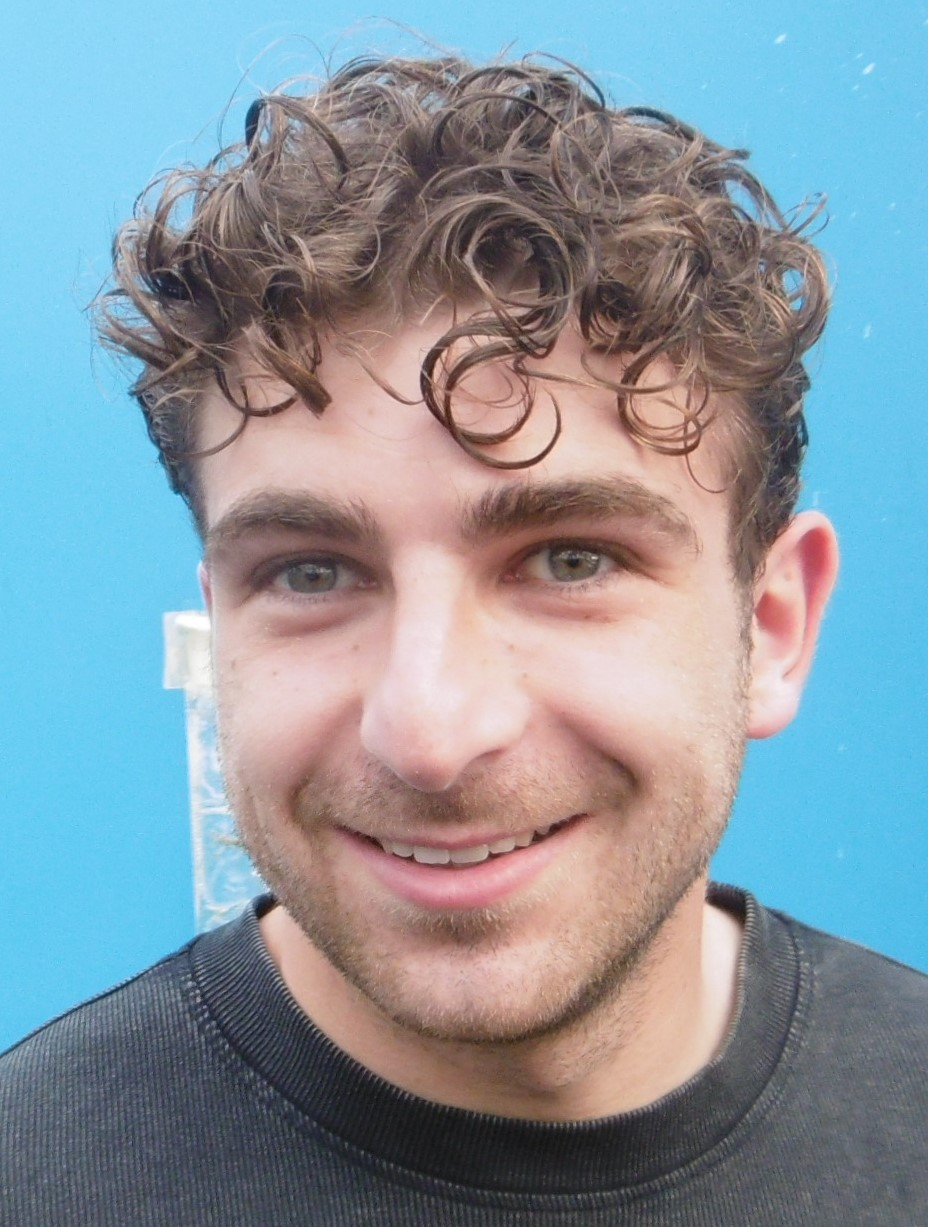

Personal information
- Date of birth: 4 March 1999 (age 27)
- Place of birth: Catanzaro, Italy
- Height: 1.80 m (5 ft 11 in)
- Position: Defender

Team information
- Current team: Benevento
- Number: 13

Youth career
- –2015: Catanzaro
- 2014–2015: → Sassuolo (loan)
- 2015–2018: Sassuolo

Senior career*
| Years | Team | Apps | (Gls) |
| 2018–2021 | Sassuolo | 0 | (0) |
| 2018–2019 | → Cuneo (loan) | 31 | (0) |
| 2019–2021 | → Alessandria (loan) | 57 | (4) |
| 2021–2024 | SPAL | 71 | (5) |
| 2024 | Ascoli | 17 | (0) |
| 2024–2026 | Cesena | 36 | (0) |
| 2026– | Benevento | 5 | (0) |

International career
| 2014 | Italy U-15 | 5 | (0) |
| 2014–2015 | Italy U-16 | 6 | (0) |
- * Club domestic league appearances and goals as of 1 May 2026

Raffaele Celia (born 4 March 1999) is an Italian professional footballer who plays as a defender for Serie B club Benevento.

== Club career ==
He made his Serie C debut for Cuneo on 17 September 2018 in a game against Pisa.

On 7 August 2019, he joined Alessandria on loan.

On 27 August 2021 he joined SPAL.

On 11 January 2024, Celia moved to Ascoli.

On 8 August 2024, Celia signed a two-season contract with Cesena.
