= Leonardo Mendicino =

Italian footballer (born 2006)

Personal information
- Date of birth: 25 June 2006 (age 20)
- Place of birth: Carate Brianza, Italy
- Height: 1.82 m (6 ft 0 in)
- Position: Defensive midfielder

Team information
- Current team: Bari
- Number: 44

Youth career
- 2014–2015: La Dominante
- 2015–2017: Renate
- 2017–2023: Atalanta

Senior career*
Years	Team	Apps	(Gls)
2023–2024	Atalanta U23	18	(0)
2023–2026	Atalanta	1	(0)
2024–2025	→ Cesena (loan)	17	(0)
2025–2026	→ Reggiana (loan)	15	(0)
2026–	Bari	2	(0)

International career^{‡}
2021–2022	Italy U16	10	(0)
2022–2023	Italy U17	14	(3)
2023–2024	Italy U18	5	(2)
2024–2025	Italy U19	10	(1)
- * Club domestic league appearances and goals as of 28 August 2026 ‡ National team caps and goals as of 19 March 2025

Leonardo Mendicino (born 25 June 2006) is an Italian professional footballer who plays as a defensive midfielder for Serie C Group C club Bari.

== Club career ==
Mendicino is a youth product of La Dominante and Renate, before moving to Atalanta's youth academy in 2017. He was promoted to the newly created Atalanta U23s in their debut season in the Serie C for the 2023–24 season. He made his senior and professional debut with the senior Atalanta team as a substitute in a 4–0 UEFA Europa League win over Raków Częstochowa on 14 December 2023.

On 30 August 2024, Mendicino moved on loan to Serie B club Cesena.

On 9 August 2025, he was loaned by Reggiana.

== International career ==
Mendicino is a youth international for Italy. He was a part of the Italy U17 at the 2023 UEFA European Under-17 Championship. In November 2023, he was called up to the Italy U18s.
