= Luca Parodi =

Italian footballer

Personal information
- Date of birth: 6 April 1995 (age 31)
- Place of birth: Savona, Italy
- Height: 1.69 m (5 ft 7 in)
- Position: Midfielder

Team information
- Current team: Virtus Entella
- Number: 23

Youth career
- –2011: Monza
- 2012–2014: Torino

Senior career*
Years	Team	Apps	(Gls)
2014–2016	Torino	0	(0)
2014–2016	→ Ancona (loan)	62	(2)
2016–2019	FeralpiSalò	89	(2)
2019	Cittadella	6	(0)
2019–2020	Ternana	32	(0)
2020–2022	Alessandria	65	(1)
2022–	Virtus Entella	133	(2)
- * Club domestic league appearances and goals as of 13 May 2026

Luca Parodi (born 6 April 1995) is an Italian football player. He plays for Serie B club Virtus Entella.

== Club career ==
He was first loaned by Torino to Ancona in the summer of 2014; his loan was renewed on 30 July 2015. He made his Serie C debut for Ancona on 7 September 2014 in a game against Reggiana, as a starter.

On 5 August 2016, he joined FeralpiSalò on a permanent basis. On 24 October 2017, he extended his contract until 30 June 2020.

On 31 January 2019, he moved up to the second tier, signing with Serie B club Cittadella. He made his Serie B debut for Cittadella on 9 February 2019 in a game against Spezia, as a starter.

On 11 July 2019, he signed a 3-year contract with Ternana.

On 1 September 2020, he signed a 3-year contract with Alessandria

On 9 August 2022, Parodi joined Virtus Entella.
