= Davide Zappella =

Italian footballer (born 1998)

Personal information
- Date of birth: 29 April 1998 (age 28)
- Place of birth: Bergamo, Italy
- Height: 1.76 m (5 ft 9 in)
- Position: Right back

Team information
- Current team: Guidonia
- Number: 77

Youth career
- –2017: Empoli

Senior career*
Years	Team	Apps	(Gls)
2017–2022	Empoli	1	(0)
2018	→ Cuneo (loan)	8	(0)
2018–2019	→ Arezzo (loan)	17	(0)
2019–2020	→ Piacenza (loan)	26	(0)
2021	→ Cesena (loan)	14	(0)
2021–2022	→ Pescara (loan)	30	(2)
2022–2025	Virtus Entella	71	(1)
2025	Trapani	6	(0)
2025–	Guidonia	34	(1)
- * Club domestic league appearances and goals as of 30 April 2026

Davide Zappella (born 29 April 1998) is an Italian professional footballer who plays as a right back for Serie C Group B club Guidonia.

== Club career ==
He started to play football in Pistoia for AC Capostrada and when he was 7 a talent scout recommended him to Empoli. He made his Serie B debut for Empoli on 26 August 2017 in a game against Ternana.

On 10 July 2019, he joined Piacenza on a season-long loan. On 27 January 2021, he was loaned to Cesena.

On 16 July 2021, he moved to Pescara on loan, Pescara were obligated to purchase his rights in case of their promotion to Serie B.

On 8 July 2022, Zappella moved to Virtus Entella on a permanent basis.
