= Andrea Filipi =

Albanian footballer (born 2003)

Personal information
- Date of birth: 29 April 2003 (age 23)
- Height: 1.77 m (5 ft 10 in)
- Position: Forward

Team information
- Current team: Asti

Youth career
- –2022: Alessandria

Senior career*
Years	Team	Apps	(Gls)
2022–2023	Alessandria	1	(0)
2022–2023	→ Arconatese (loan)	0	(0)
2023–	Asti	4	(0)

International career
2019	Albania U17	3	(0)
- * Club domestic league appearances and goals as of 7 May 2023

Andrea Filipi (born 29 April 2003) is an Albanian professional footballer who plays as a forward for Serie D side Asti.

== Club career ==
On 19 February 2022 he made his professional debut for Alessandria in a 3–0 away loss against Ascoli.

== International career ==
Filipi was called up the Albania under-17 football team in 2019.

== Club statistics ==
=== Club ===
As of 22 February 2022.

Club	Season	League			Cup		Other		Total	
Club	Season	Division	Apps	Goals	Apps	Goals	Apps	Goals	Apps	Goals
Alessandria	2021–22	Serie B	1	0	0	0	0	0	1	0
Career total			1	0	0	0	0	0	1	0
