= Davide Di Molfetta =

Italian footballer (born 1996)

Personal information
- Full name: Davide Di Molfetta
- Date of birth: 23 June 1996 (age 30)
- Place of birth: Sesto San Giovanni, Italy
- Height: 1.80 m (5 ft 11 in)
- Position: Forward

Team information
- Current team: Union Brescia
- Number: 7

Youth career
- 2001–2002: Rondinella
- 2002–2015: AC Milan

Senior career*
Years	Team	Apps	(Gls)
2014–2017	AC Milan	1	(0)
2015–2016	→ Benevento (loan)	10	(0)
2016	→ Rimini (loan)	11	(1)
2016–2017	→ Prato (loan)	36	(2)
2017–2018	Vicenza	16	(0)
2018–2019	Piacenza	56	(2)
2019–2020	Catania	24	(2)
2020–2021	Mantova	28	(3)
2021–2025	Feralpisalò	110	(13)
2025–	Union Brescia	18	(4)

International career^{‡}
2011–2012	Italy U16	6	(1)
2012–2013	Italy U17	13	(0)
2014	Italy U18	1	(0)
2014–2015	Italy U19	4	(1)
- * Club domestic league appearances and goals as of 29 April 2026 ‡ National team caps and goals as of 25 February 2015

Davide Di Molfetta (born 23 June 1996) is an Italian professional footballer who plays as a forward for Serie C Group A club Union Brescia.

== Club career ==
=== Early career ===
Di Molfetta was born in Sesto San Giovanni, a suburb of Milan. He first started playing football as a child, joining local amateur club Rondinella. At the age of 6 he was recruited by AC Milan, where he went on to spend 13 years in their youth system. Di Molfetta also made his professional debut with the club, coming on for Giacomo Bonaventura in the late stages of a 3–1 away win against Atalanta on 30 May 2015, aged 18.

=== Benevento and Rimini (2015–2016) ===
For the 2015–16 season, Di Molfetta was sent out on loan to Lega Pro club Benevento. However, the deal was cut short during the January transfer window and he was loaned out to Rimini, another Lega Pro club, for the remainder of the season.

=== Prato (2016–2017) ===
At the beginning of the 2016–17 season, Di Molfetta was once again loaned out to a Lega Pro club, this time to Prato.

=== Serie C ===
On 28 August 2019, he joined Catania.

On 8 October 2020, he moved to Mantova.

On 29 June 2021, he signed with Feralpisalò.

== Career statistics ==
=== Club ===
As of match played 28 August 2021

Appearances and goals by club, season and competition
Club	Season	League			National Cup		Other		Total	
Club	Season	Division	Apps	Goals	Apps	Goals	Apps	Goals	Apps	Goals
Milan	2014–15	Serie A	1	0	0	0	—		1	0
Benevento (loan)	2015–16	Lega Pro	10	0	0	0	—		10	0
Rimini (loan)	2015–16	Lega Pro	11	0	0	0	2 (Note: Appearance(s) in Relegation Playoffs)	0	13	0
Prato (loan)	2016–17	Lega Pro	36	2	0	0	2	0	38	2
Vicenza	2017–18	Serie C	16	0	0	0	—		16	0
Piacenza	2017–18	Serie C	12	0	0	0	5 (Note: Appearance(s) in Promotion Playoffs)	0	17	0
Piacenza	2018–19	Serie C	34	2	1	0	5	0	40	2
Piacenza	Total		46	2	1	0	10	0	57	2
Catania	2019–20	Serie C	23	2	1	0	2	0	26	2
Mantova	2020–21	Serie C	28	3	0	0	—		28	3
Feralpisalò	2021–22	Serie C	35	1	2	0	6	1	43	2
Feralpisalò	2022–23	Serie C	14	2	2	0	—		16	2
Career total			220	12	6	0	22	1	248	13
