= Matteo Pisseri =

Italian footballer

Personal information
- Date of birth: 21 November 1991 (age 34)
- Place of birth: Parma, Italy
- Height: 1.88 m (6 ft 2 in)
- Position: Goalkeeper

Team information
- Current team: Frosinone
- Number: 12

Youth career
- 2008–2011: Parma

Senior career*
Years	Team	Apps	(Gls)
2011–2012	Renate	33	(0)
2012–2015	Parma	3	(0)
2012–2013	→ Catanzaro (loan)	26	(0)
2013–2014	→ Gubbio (loan)	31	(0)
2014–2015	→ Juve Stabia (loan)	41	(0)
2015–2016	Ternana	0	(0)
2015–2016	→ Monopoli (loan)	33	(0)
2016–2019	Catania	118	(0)
2019–2020	Pistoiese	26	(0)
2020–2022	Alessandria	67	(0)
2022–2023	Triestina	14	(0)
2023	→ Monopoli (loan)	3	(0)
2023–2025	Cesena	46	(0)
2025–	Frosinone	1	(0)
- * Club domestic league appearances and goals as of 12 May 2026

Matteo Pisseri (born 21 November 1991) is an Italian professional footballer who plays as a goalkeeper for Serie A club Frosinone.

== Career ==
Pisseri started his career at Parma, the club he has supported since his childhood. He was one of the keepers of the Primavera (youth team) from 2008 to 2011, as backup of Andrea Gasparri, Stefano Russo and Daniele Agosti respectively. Pisseri graduated from the youth system in 2011 and left for Renate on 7 July 2011 in a co-ownership deal. He made 33 appearances for the Lega Pro Seconda Divisione side and was rated the first among youngsters of Lega Pro (players born in 1990 or after) by La Gazzetta dello Sport.

In early June 2012, Parma chose to buy back the 50% share that they had sold a year ago.

On 15 July 2012, he was signed by another fourth division club Catanzaro in temporary deal.

On 9 August 2019, he signed with Pistoiese.

On 19 August 2020, he joined Alessandria.

On 29 August 2022, Pisseri signed a two-year contract with Triestina. On 31 January 2023, Pisseri returned to Monopoli on loan.

On 2 September 2025, Pisseri joined Frosinone in Serie B.

== Career statistics ==
As of match played 8 May 2026

Appearances and goals by club, season and competition
Club	Season	League			National cup		Other		Total	
Club	Season	Division	Apps	Goals	Apps	Goals	Apps	Goals	Apps	Goals
Renate	2011–12	Lega Pro 2D	33	0	3	0	—		36	0
Catanzaro (loan)	2012–13	Lega Pro 1D	26	0	0	0	—		26	0
Gubbio (loan)	2013–14	Lega Pro 1D	29	0	2	0	—		31	0
Juve Stabia (loan)	2014–15	Lega Pro	38	0	3	0	1	0	42	0
Ternana	2015–16	Serie B	0	0	0	0	—		0	0
Monopoli (loan)	2015–16	Lega Pro	31	0	—		2	0	33	0
Catania	2016–17	Lega Pro	38	0	3	0	1	0	42	0
Catania	2017–18	Serie C	36	0	1	0	4	0	41	0
Catania	2018–19	Serie C	34	0	4	0	5	0	43	0
Catania	Total		108	0	8	0	10	0	126	0
Pistoiese	2019–20	Serie C	26	0	3	0	—		29	0
Alessandria	2020–21	Serie C	30	0	1	0	6	0	37	0
Alessandria	2021–22	Serie B	37	0	2	0	—		39	0
Alessandria	Total		67	0	3	0	6	0	53	0
Triestina	2022–23	Serie C	14	0	0	0	—		14	0
Monopoli (loan)	2022–23	Serie C	3	0	—		0	0	3	0
Cesena	2023–24	Serie C	35	0	2	0	2	0	39	0
Cesena	2024–25	Serie B	11	0	3	0	0	0	14	0
Cesena	Total		46	0	5	0	2	0	53	0
Frosinone	2025–26	Serie B	1	0	1	0	—		2	0
Frosinone	2026–27	Serie A	0	0	0	0	—		0	0
Frosinone	Total		1	0	1	0	—		2	0
Career total			422	0	29	0	21	0	472	0
