= Francesco Disanto =

Italian footballer

Personal information
- Date of birth: 10 October 1994 (age 32)
- Place of birth: Florence, Italy
- Height: 1.80 m (5 ft 11 in)
- Position: Winger

Team information
- Current team: Grosseto

Senior career*
Years	Team	Apps	(Gls)
2012–2013	Scandicci	32	(3)
2013–2014	Arezzo	32	(3)
2014–2017	Pontedera	82	(4)
2017	Arezzo	5	(0)
2017–2019	Sangiovannese	47	(15)
2019–2021	San Donato	47	(13)
2021–2023	Siena	66	(12)
2023–2024	Virtus Entella	11	(0)
2024	→ Lucchese (loan)	13	(1)
2024–2025	Trento	34	(2)
2025–	Grosseto	0	(0)
- * Club domestic league appearances and goals as of 25 April 2025

Francesco Disanto (born 10 October 1994) is an Italian professional footballer who plays as a winger for Serie D club Grosseto.

== Career ==
Born in Florence, Disanto started his career in Serie D club Scandicci.

After a spell in 2013–14 with Arezzo, on 3 July 2014 he signed with Serie C club Pontedera. Disanto made his professional debut on 14 September 2014 against Ancona. He played three years in Pontedera.

In January 2018, he moved to Serie D club Sangiovannese.

In 2019, he joined to Serie D club San Donato Tavarnelle. He played 47 matches in two seasons.

On 10 July 2021, he returned to Serie C, and signed with Siena.

On 24 July 2023, Disanto moved to Virtus Entella.

On 6 July 2024, Disanto signed a two-season contract with Trento.
