= Riccardo Chiarello =

Italian footballer, midfielder

Personal information
- Date of birth: 9 October 1993 (age 33)
- Place of birth: Arzignano, Italy
- Height: 1.76 m (5 ft 9 in)
- Position: Midfielder

Youth career
- Chievo

Senior career*
Years	Team	Apps	(Gls)
2012–2014	Trissino-Valdagno	67	(9)
2014–2015	Real Vicenza	14	(0)
2015–2016	ArzignanoChiampo	34	(11)
2017–2019	Giana Erminio	87	(14)
2019–2022	Alessandria	88	(12)
2022–2025	Cesena	45	(4)
2025	Campobasso	7	(0)
2025–2026	Arzignano	17	(1)
- * Club domestic league appearances and goals as of 22 August 2026

Riccardo Chiarello (born 9 October 1993) is an Italian professional footballer who plays as a midfielder.

== Club career ==
Chiarello was born in Arzignano, he started playing football at Chievo youth team. He made his fourth-tier debut in Trissino-Valdagno, before he signed to Lega Pro side Real Vicenza. He made his professional debut in the 2014–15 season, on 28 September 2014 against Renate, coming in as a substitute for Daniel Beccaro in the 70th minute. He played in ArzignanoChiampo and Giana Erminio, before he signed to Alessandria on 11 January 2019.

On 7 July 2022 he joined Cesena. He left Cesena on 2 February 2025.

== Sources ==
- Riccardo Chiarello at TuttoCalciatori.net (in Italian)
