= Victor De Lucia =

Italian footballer

Personal information
- Date of birth: 28 May 1996 (age 30)
- Place of birth: Santa Maria a Vico, Italy
- Height: 1.87 m (6 ft 2 in)
- Position: Goalkeeper

Team information
- Current team: Casertana
- Number: 1

Youth career
- –2012: Racing Fondi
- 2013–2014: Parma
- 2014–2015: Frosinone

Senior career*
Years	Team	Apps	(Gls)
2012–2013	Racing Fondi	7	(0)
2014–2015	Frosinone	0	(0)
2015	Latina	0	(0)
2016	Taranto	16	(0)
2016–2017	Catanzaro	22	(0)
2017–2018	Bari	2	(0)
2018–2021	Feralpisalò	86	(0)
2021–2022	Frosinone	0	(0)
2022	→ Feralpisalò (loan)	17	(0)
2022–2024	Virtus Entella	59	(0)
2024–2025	Foggia	17	(0)
2025–	Casertana	38	(0)
- * Club domestic league appearances and goals as of 1 May 2026

Victor De Lucia (born 28 May 1996) is an Italian professional footballer who plays as a goalkeeper for Serie C Group C club Casertana.

== Club career ==
He made his Serie C debut for Catanzaro on 6 December 2016 in a game against Vibonese. He made his Serie B debut for Bari on 10 December 2017 in a game against Palermo.

On 2 July 2021, he returned to Frosinone on a two-year contract. On 3 January 2022, he was loaned back to Feralpisalò.

On 29 June 2022, De Lucia signed with Virtus Entella.

On 1 July 2024, he moved to Foggia on a two-year contract.
