= Saber Hraiech =

Italian footballer

Personal information
- Date of birth: 30 July 1995 (age 31)
- Place of birth: Mazara del Vallo, Italy
- Height: 1.80 m (5 ft 11 in)
- Position: Midfielder

Team information
- Current team: Ternana
- Number: 5

Youth career
- –2011: Mazara
- 2012–2014: Virtus Entella
- 2013–2014: → Sampdoria (loan)

Senior career*
Years	Team	Apps	(Gls)
2011–2012	Mazara		
2013	Virtus Entella	1	(0)
2014–2015	Virtus Entella	0	(0)
2014–2015	→ Piacenza (loan)	33	(6)
2015–2017	Piacenza	72	(7)
2017–2021	Carpi	41	(1)
2018–2019	→ Imolese (loan)	34	(2)
2020–2021	→ Padova (loan)	34	(3)
2021–2022	Padova	60	(4)
2022–2025	Cesena	64	(5)
2025–2026	Trapani	8	(1)
2025–2026	→ Gubbio (loan)	24	(1)
2026–	Ternana	0	(0)
- * Club domestic league appearances and goals as of 30 April 2026

Saber Hraiech (born 30 July 1995) is an Italian footballer of Tunisian descent who plays as a midfielder for Serie D club Ternana.

== Club career ==
Born in Mazara del Vallo, Sicily to parents of Tunisian origin, he made his footballing debut with his hometown team at the age of 15 in the Serie D league, and successively as a first team regular in the club's following Eccellenza Sicily's campaign at the age of 16.

He made his Serie C debut for Virtus Entella on 6 January 2013 in a game against Tritium.

After three years at Serie D and Serie C level for Piacenza, he joined Serie B club Carpi for the 2017–18 season. He was loaned out to newly promoted Serie C club Imolese in August 2018. On 24 September 2020, he was loaned to Serie C club Padova, with an obligation to buy.

On 23 July 2022, he left Padova for Serie C club Cesena.

On 3 January 2025, he joined Serie C side Trapani.
