= Giovanni Nannelli =

Italian footballer (born 2000)

Personal information
- Date of birth: 17 February 2000 (age 26)
- Place of birth: Empoli, Italy
- Height: 1.74 m (5 ft 9 in)
- Position: Winger

Team information
- Current team: Chievo

Youth career
- –2019: Fiorentina

Senior career*
| Years | Team | Apps | (Gls) |
| 2019–2021 | Lucchese | 57 | (5) |
| 2021–2024 | Cesena | 6 | (0) |
| 2022 | → Montevarchi (loan) | 3 | (0) |
| 2022–2023 | → Fermana (loan) | 14 | (0) |
| 2024– | Chievo | 0 | (0) |
- * Club domestic league appearances and goals as of 4 May 2024

Giovanni Nannelli (born 17 February 2000) is an Italian professional footballer who plays as a winger for Serie D Group B club Chievo.

== Club career ==
Born in Empoli, Nannelli started his career in Fiorentina youth sector.

In 2019 he joined Lucchese, on Serie D, he made his senior debut this season and won the promotion to Serie C. Nannelli made his professional debut on 27 September 2020 against Pergolettese.

On 19 July 2021, he signed for Serie C club Cesena.

On 29 January 2022, he moved on loan to Montevarchi. On 1 September 2022, Nannelli was loaned by Fermana.
