= Matteo Piacentini =

Italian footballer

Personal information
- Date of birth: 20 April 1999 (age 27)
- Place of birth: Sassuolo, Italy
- Height: 1.87 m (6 ft 2 in)
- Position: Defender

Team information
- Current team: Cesena
- Number: 26

Youth career
- 2014–2018: Sassuolo

Senior career*
Years	Team	Apps	(Gls)
2018–2019	Sassuolo	0	(0)
2018–2019	→ Teramo (loan)	23	(0)
2019–2022	Teramo	74	(0)
2022–2023	Modena	12	(0)
2023	→ Triestina (loan)	15	(1)
2023–	Cesena	37	(1)
- * Club domestic league appearances and goals as of 13 May 2026

Matteo Piacentini (born 20 April 1999) is an Italian footballer who plays as a defender for Serie B club Cesena.

== Club career ==
=== Sassuolo ===
==== Loan to Teramo ====
On 17 July 2018, Piacentini was loaned to Serie C club Teramo on a season-long loan deal. On 30 September he made his Serie C debut for Teramo as a substitute replacing Riccardo Mastrilli in the 46th minute of a 1–1 home draw against Gubbio. One week later, on 7 October he played his first entire match for Teramo, a 3–1 away defeat against FeralpiSalò. Piacentini ended his season-long loan to Teramo with 23 appearances, including 20 as a starter, and 1 assist.

=== Modena ===
On 5 January 2022, he signed a 2.5-year contract with Modena. On 31 January 2023, Piacentini was loaned to Triestina.

=== Cesena ===
On 31 July 2023, Piacentini moved to Cesena on a three-year deal.

== Career statistics ==
=== Club ===
As of match played 23 February 2022

Appearances and goals by club, season and competition
Club	Season	League			National Cup		League Cup		Other		Total	
Club	Season	Division	Apps	Goals	Apps	Goals	Apps	Goals	Apps	Goals	Apps	Goals
Sassuolo	2018–19	Serie A	0	0	0	0	—		—		0	0
Teramo (loan)	2018–19	Serie C	23	0	0	0	2	0	—		25	0
Teramo	2019–20	Serie C	27	0	—		2	0	1 (Note: Appearance(s) in Promotion Playoffs)	0	30	0
Teramo	2020–21	Serie C	28	0	2	0	0	0	1	0	31	0
Teramo	2021–22	Serie C	19	0	0	0	4	0	—		23	0
Teramo	Total		74	0	2	0	6	0	2	0	84	0
Modena	2021–22	Serie C	6	0	—		—		—		6	0
Career total			103	0	2	0	8	0	2	0	115	0

== Honours ==
=== Club ===
Sassuolo Primavera

- Torneo di Viareggio: 2017
