= Tommaso Berti =

Italian footballer (born 2004)

Personal information
- Date of birth: 7 March 2004 (age 22)
- Place of birth: Cesena, Italy
- Height: 1.71 m (5 ft 7 in)
- Position: Midfielder

Team information
- Current team: Cremonese
- Number: 14

Youth career
- –2020: Cesena
- 2022–2023: → Fiorentina (loan)

Senior career*
Years	Team	Apps	(Gls)
2021–2026	Cesena	127	(13)
2022–2023	→ Fiorentina (loan)	0	(0)
2026–	Cremonese	0	(0)

International career^{‡}
2025–	Italy U21	3	(1)
- * Club domestic league appearances and goals as of 13 May 2026 ‡ National team caps and goals as of 13 November 2026

Tommaso Berti (born 7 March 2004) is an Italian professional footballer who plays as a midfielder for Serie B club Cremonese.

== Club career ==
Tommaso Berti made his professional debut for Cesena on the 22 August 2021, during a 3-1 home Coppa Serie C win against Pistoiese. He made his championship debut less than a month later during a game against Imolese. In 2022, he joined Fiorentina on loan, who assigned him to their under-19s.

On 26 June 2026, Berti moved to Cremonese in Serie B.

== International career ==
In May 2026, he got his first call-up with the Italy national senior team for the two friendlies against Greece and Luxembourg, as interim coach Silvio Baldini, decided to focus on young players after Italy failed to qualify for the World Cup.
