= Luigi Silvestri =

Italian footballer

Personal information
- Date of birth: 22 January 1993 (age 33)
- Place of birth: Palermo, Italy
- Height: 1.80 m (5 ft 11 in)
- Position: Centre back

Team information
- Current team: Union Brescia
- Number: 28

Youth career
- –2012: Palermo

Senior career*
Years	Team	Apps	(Gls)
2012–2013	Salernitana	3	(0)
2013	→ Città di Campobasso (loan)	12	(0)
2013–2015	ACR Messina	52	(2)
2015–2016	Siena	6	(0)
2016	→ Melfi (loan)	9	(0)
2016–2017	Paganese	19	(0)
2017–2019	Vibonese	58	(7)
2019–2020	Potenza	19	(0)
2020–2022	Avellino	56	(4)
2022–2023	Siena	19	(0)
2023–2025	Cesena	48	(7)
2024–2025	→ Trapani (loan)	26	(4)
2025–	Union Brescia	31	(2)
- * Club domestic league appearances and goals as of 29 April 2026

Luigi Silvestri (born 22 January 1993) is an Italian professional footballer who plays as a centre back for Serie C Group A club Union Brescia.

== Club career ==
In September 2020, Silvestri joined to Serie C club Avellino.

On 21 July 2022, Silvestri returned to Siena.

On 19 January 2023, Silvestri signed a 1.5-year contract with Cesena. On 29 August 2024, Silvestri was loaned by Trapani.

On 31 July 2025, Silvesti joined Union Brescia on a two-season contract.

== Career statistics ==
=== Club ===
As of match played 6 June 2021

Appearances and goals by club, season and competition
Club	Season	League			National Cup		Other		Total	
Club	Season	Division	Apps	Goals	Apps	Goals	Apps	Goals	Apps	Goals
Salernitana	2012–13	Lega Pro 2	3	0	—		—		3	0
Città di Campobasso (loan)	2012–13	Lega Pro 2	12	0	—		—		12	0
ACR Messina	2013–14	Lega Pro 2	28	2	—		3 (Note: Two appearances in Supercoppa C2, one appearance in Coppa Italia Serie C)	0	31	2
ACR Messina	2014–15	Serie C	24	0	1	0	1 (Note: Appearance(s) in Promotion Serie C)	0	26	0
ACR Messina	Total		52	2	1	0	4	0	57	2
Siena	2015–16	Serie C	6	0	0	0	3 (Note: Appearance(s) in Coppa Italia Serie C)	0	9	0
Melfi (loan)	2015–16	Serie C	9	0	—		2	0	11	0
Paganese	2016–17	Serie C	19	0	—		1	0	20	0
Vibonese	2016–17	Serie C	11	0	—		2	0	13	0
Vibonese	2017–18	Serie D	26	5	—		5 (Note: Appearance(s) in Promotion Serie D)	2	31	7
Vibonese	2018–19	Serie C	21	2	—		2	0	23	2
Vibonese	Total		58	7	0	0	9	2	67	9
Potenza	2019–20	Serie C	19	0	1	0	6 (Note: three appearances in Playoffs Serie C, three appearances in Coppa Italia Serie C)	0	26	0
Avellino	2020–21	Serie C	26	4	—		1 (Note: Appearance(s) in Playoffs Serie C)	0	27	4
Career total			204	13	2	0	26	2	232	15
