= Stadio Dino Manuzzi =

Football stadium in Cesena, Italy

Coordinates: 44°8′26″N 12°15′43″E

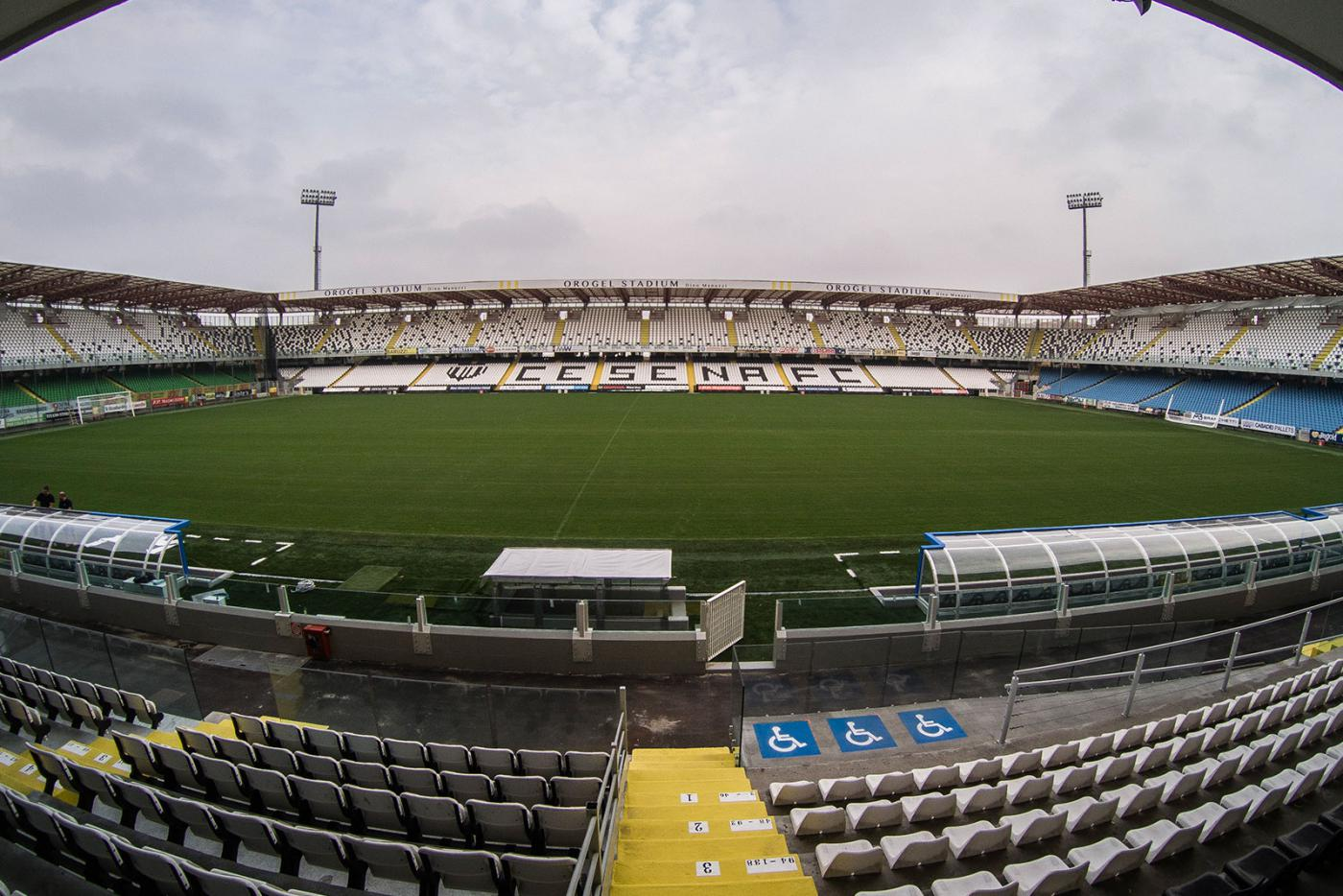
- Interactive map of Stadio Dino Manuzzi
- Former names: Stadio La Fiorita (1957–1982)
- Location: Cesena, Italy
- Owner: Municipality of Cesena
- Capacity: 20,194
- Surface: Artificial; Limonta SoccerPro; 105x68m

Construction
- Groundbreaking: 1957
- Opened: 1957
- Renovated: 2018

Tenants
- Cesena FC (2018–); A.C. Cesena (1957 –2018); Spezia Calcio (2020); Italy national football team (selected matches)

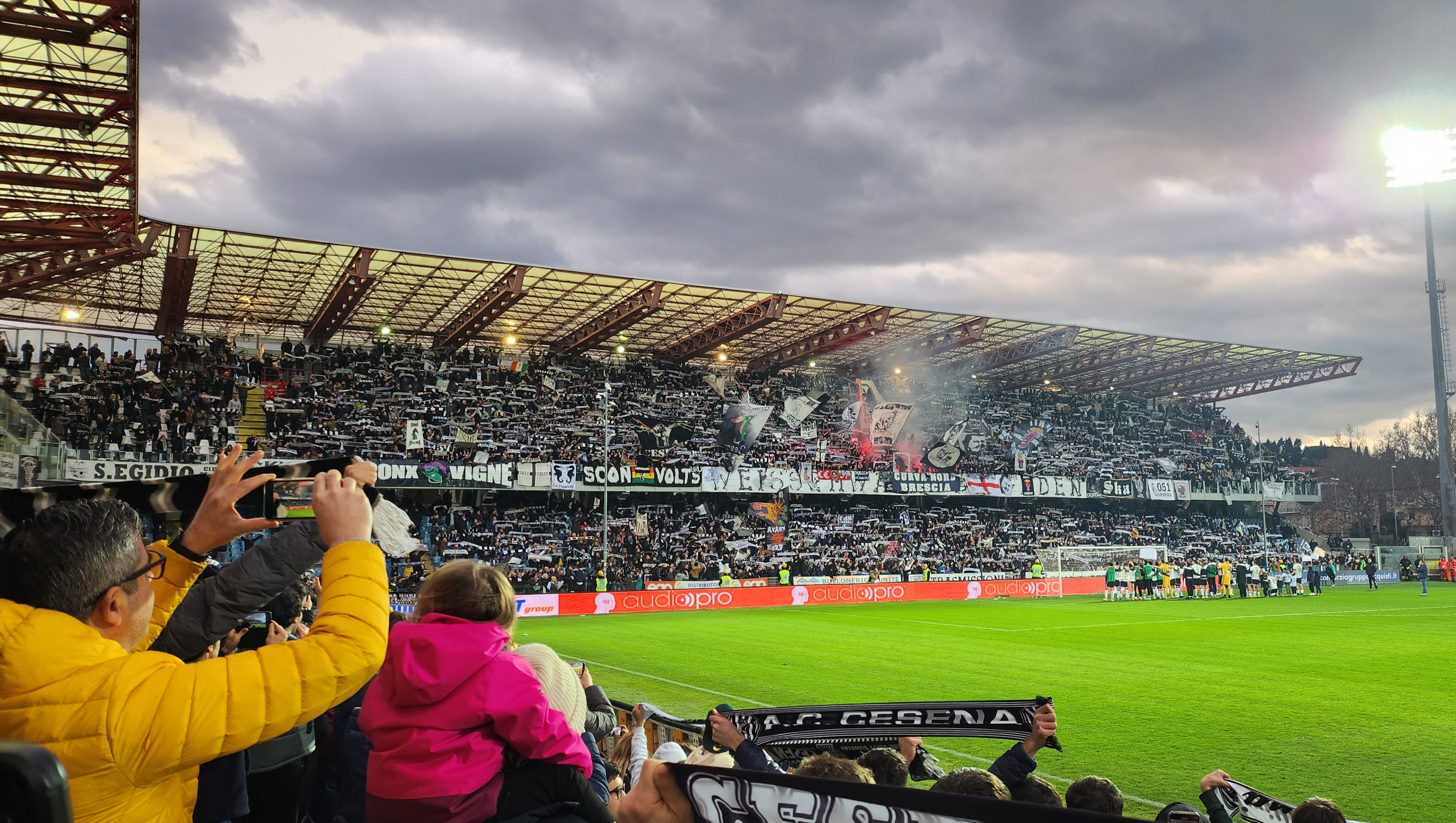
Curva Mare (2023)

The Stadio Dino Manuzzi is a football stadium in Cesena, Italy. It is currently the home of Cesena FC. The stadium holds a maximum of 20,194 spectators.

== History ==
The stadium was initially constructed in 1957 but had no seats at the time (sporting only two terraces instead). In 1973, when AC Cesena reached Serie A status, the stadium was greatly expanded and could hold 30,000 spectators. In this version of the stadium, the highest ever attendance was recorded when on 10 February 1974, 35,991 people watched Cesena defeat giants AC Milan. The stadium was called La Fiorita from its construction until 1982, when it became named after former Cesena president Dino Manuzzi.

In 1988, the stadium underwent a complete restructuring were all of the existing stands were demolished and then rebuilt. The new capacity was reduced to 20,194.

As a part of Italy's Euro 2016 bid, the Dino Manuzzi was included and there were plans to invest close to €30m on the stadium. The planned changes included an increase in capacity to over 31,000, new press boxes, VIP lounges and media boxes. This fell through after Euro 2016 was awarded to France.

At the beginning of the 2011–12 season, the pitch was converted to an artificial playing surface, with Cesena becoming the first club to do so. On 13 August 2011, at the end of the Italy - Japan rugby match, fans were allowed to enter the pitch and take a cut out of grass with them. That same summer some further work was carried out on the stadium, including a capacity expansion by 1,000 seats. New chairs were installed. The chairs were a white and black colour and on one terrace they spell out Cesena FC. Two Plexiglas boxes were also installed on the side of the pitch, each holding eight supporters, where the fans can track the progress of the match from just a few meters away.

In 2014, Orogel signed a sponsorship agreement with Cesena FC, the tenant of the stadium. The stadium would be called Orogel Stadium – Dino Manuzzi.

Preceded by Aalborg Stadium; Aalborg	UEFA Women's Euro; Final Venue; 1993	Succeeded by Fritz-Walter-Stadion; Kaiserslautern
