= Simone Corazza =

Italian footballer

Personal information
- Date of birth: 22 March 1991 (age 35)
- Place of birth: Latisana, Italy
- Height: 1.78 m (5 ft 10 in)
- Position: Forward

Team information
- Current team: Pistoiese

Youth career
- Portogruaro

Senior career*
Years	Team	Apps	(Gls)
2009–2013	Portogruaro	62	(16)
2009–2010	→ Venezia (loan)	36	(12)
2010–2011	→ Valenzana (loan)	31	(6)
2013–2014	Sampdoria	0	(0)
2013–2014	→ Südtirol (loan)	29	(10)
2014–2017	Novara	88	(18)
2017–2019	Piacenza	35	(10)
2019–2020	Reggina	25	(14)
2020–2022	Alessandria	68	(18)
2022–2024	Cesena	66	(29)
2024–2026	Ascoli	45	(14)
2026–	Pistoiese	0	(0)
- * Club domestic league appearances and goals as of 30 April 2026

Simone Corazza (born 22 March 1991) is an Italian footballer who plays for Serie D club Pistoiese.

== Biography ==
On 5 July 2012 Corazza was signed by U.C. Sampdoria from Calcio Portogruaro Summaga, for €380,000 in a 4-year contract. In the same transfer window he returned to Portogruaro in a temporary deal. In 2013, he left for South Tyrol. On 9 July 2014 Corazza was signed by Novara Calcio in a temporary deal. On 10 July 2015 Corazza was signed by Novara in a definitive deal.

On 31 August 2017, he moved to Piacenza.

On 16 July 2019, he signed a 2-year contract with Reggina.

On 3 September 2020, he signed a 3-year contract with Alessandria.

On 25 July 2022, Corazza moved to Cesena on a three-year contract.

On 8 August 2024, Corazza signed a two-year contract with Ascoli.
