= Cristian Shpendi =

Albanian footballer (born 2003 in Ancona)

Personal information
- Date of birth: 19 May 2003 (age 23)
- Place of birth: Ancona, Italy
- Height: 1.81 m (5 ft 11 in)
- Position: Striker

Team information
- Current team: Cesena
- Number: 9

Youth career
- Real Metauro
- C.S.I. Delfino Fano
- –2019: San Marino
- 2019–2021: Cesena

Senior career*
Years	Team	Apps	(Gls)
2021–	Cesena	136	(53)

International career^{‡}
2021	Albania U19	8	(3)
2022–2024	Albania U21	8	(1)
2025–	Albania	4	(0)
- * Club domestic league appearances and goals as of 20 November 2026 ‡ National team caps and goals as of 29 September 2026

Cristian Shpendi (born 19 May 2003) is a professional footballer who plays as a striker for Italian club Cesena. Born in Italy, he plays for the Albania national team.

== Club career ==
=== Early life ===
Shpendi was born in Ancona, Italy, alongside his twin brother, Stiven, to Albanian parents from Pukë who immigrated to Italy in 1997. The twins began their youth careers at Real Metauro, before moving to Delfino Fano and then San Marino's academy, eventually joining Cesena.

=== Cesena ===
The twins began their competitive careers at Cesena with the under-17 team, making 16 appearances each in the Allievi Nazionali U17 league, where Cristian scored 14 goals and Stiven 11. They subsequently joined the club's Primavera side for the 2020–21 Campionato Primavera 3, scoring 15 and 13 goals respectively and helping Cesena reach the final, where they lost to Arezzo.

In the following season, Shpendi scored 15 goals in 17 appearances in the 2021–22 Campionato Primavera 2, while his brother scored 23 in 20 matches to finish as the league's top scorer, helping Cesena win the championship and earn promotion to Primavera 1. The twins also scored twice each in a 4–1 victory over Udinese in the Primavera 2 Super Cup. During the same season, Shpendi was promoted to the first team and made his professional debut under manager William Viali on 25 September 2021, starting in a 1–0 away defeat to Olbia before being substituted for Salvatore Caturano after 57 minutes. On 25 February 2022, the twins extended their contracts with Cesena until 2025.

During the 2022–23 season, Shpendi began featuring more regularly in Cesena's first team after impressing during pre-season, when he scored twice in a friendly tournament against Forlì. He started alongside his twin brother Stiven in the league opener against Carrarese in September 2022, but subsequently received limited playing time. He scored his first official goal for the senior team on 15 April 2023, in a 2–0 home win over Vis Pesaro. He finished the season with 16 league appearances and one goal, having mostly featured as a substitute.

Shpendi became a key player during the 2023–24 season, scoring 20 goals in Serie C's Group B to finish as the competition's top scorer in the group, and also scored twice in the promotion play-offs, helping Cesena win the league title and secure promotion to Serie B.

He made his Serie B debut on 18 August 2024, scoring twice in a 2–1 victory over Carrarese. He continued his scoring form during the first half of the season, including a brace in a 2–0 win over Brescia on 26 October, when he converted two penalties. In December he signed a contract extension until June 2028. He finished the 2024–25 season with 13 goals in 38 appearances across all competitions, was voted Cesena's Best Player for the 2024–25 season by the club's supporters, and was subsequently included in the Serie B team of the season as its best forward.

On 17 January 2026, he scored both goals in a 2–1 comeback away victory over Reggiana, bringing his total to 44 goals in official matches for Cesena, placing him fourth in the club's all-time scoring rankings at the time. In the 2025–26 season, Shpendi finished with 12 goals in 38 appearances across all competitions.

In September 2026, Shpendi was named Serie B's Player of the Month, having scored four goals during the month. By 3 November, he had scored eight league goals, placing him at the top of the division's scoring chart.

== International career ==
Shpendi represented the Albania under-19 team in 2021, scoring twice in friendlies and the equaliser in a 2–2 draw against Serbia during the 2022 UEFA European Under-19 Championship qualifiers, where Albania finished level on four points with Serbia but were eliminated on goal difference. He made his under-21 debut in 2022 and subsequently featured in the 2025 UEFA European Under-21 Championship qualification, making five appearances. On 17 November 2023, he scored and provided an assist in Albania's 3–2 comeback victory over Romania U21, with his twin brother Stiven also scoring after Albania had trailed 2–0 at half-time.

On 1 September 2025, Shpendi received his first senior call-up from head coach Sylvinho for a friendly against Gibraltar and a 2026 FIFA World Cup qualifier against Latvia, replacing Ernest Muçi, who withdrew due to physical problems. He made his debut three days later against Gibraltar, coming on at half-time and winning a penalty in the 69th minute after his shot struck an opponent's hand, which Jasir Asani converted to secure a 1–0 away victory for Albania.

== Career statistics ==
=== Club ===
As of match played 20 November 2026

Club statistics
Club	Season	League			Cup		Europe (Note: Including continental competitions, such as UEFA Champions League and UEFA Europa League)		Other (Note: Including promotion play-offs and Serie C Supercups)		Total	
Club	Season	Division	Apps	Goals	Apps	Goals	Apps	Goals	Apps	Goals	Apps	Goals
Cesena	2021–22	Serie C	5	0	2	0	—		0	0	7	0
Cesena	2022–23	Serie C	16	1	2	0	—		3	0	21	1
Cesena	2023–24	Serie C	32	20	2	1	—		1	1	35	22
Cesena	2024–25	Serie B	34	11	3	2	—		1	0	38	13
Cesena	2025–26	Serie B	37	12	1	0	—		—		38	12
Cesena	2026–27	Serie B	12	9	1	0	—		—		13	9
Total			136	53	11	3	—		5	1	152	57
Career total			136	53	11	3	—		5	1	152	57

=== International ===
As of match played 29 September 2026

Appearances and goals by national team and year
National team	Year	Apps	Goals
Albania
Albania	2025	1	0
Albania	2026	3	0
Total		4	0
