= Andrea Ciofi =

Italian footballer (born 1999)

Personal information
- Date of birth: 28 June 1999 (age 27)
- Place of birth: Marino, Italy
- Height: 1.87 m (6 ft 2 in)
- Position: Defender

Team information
- Current team: Cesena
- Number: 15

Youth career
- 2015–2018: Roma

Senior career*
Years	Team	Apps	(Gls)
2018–	Cesena	249	(11)
- * Club domestic league appearances and goals as of 13 May 2026

Andrea Ciofi (born 28 June 1999) is an Italian professional footballer who plays as defender for Serie B club Cesena.

== Career ==
Ciofi was a youth product of Roma. He moved to Cesena in January 2018. He made his debut on professional football on 8 September 2019 in a 2–0 win against Virtus Verona. In the 2020–21 season, he became team's captain.
