= Cesena FC =

Italian football club

Cesena
- Full name: Cesena Football Club
- Nicknames: I Cavallucci Marini (The Seahorses); I Bianconeri (The White and Blacks)
- Founded: 1940; 86 years ago as A.C Cesena; 2018; 8 years ago as Cesena Football Club
- Stadium: Orogel Stadium - Dino Manuzzi
- Capacity: 20,194
- Owner: JRL Investment Partners LLC
- President: Jonathan Aiello
- Head coach: Alessandro Diamanti
- League: Serie B
- 2025–26: Serie B, 11th of 20
- Website: cesenafc.com
Home colours	Away colours	Third colours

Cesena Football Club is an Italian professional football club based in Cesena, Emilia-Romagna. It currently plays in the Serie B, after promotion from the Serie C in 2023–24. It has claimed to be the phoenix club of AC Cesena since 2018, the year that the club folded.

== History ==
=== Foundation ===
In July 2018 A.S.D. Romagna Centro, or known as Romagna Centro, applied to rename as "Cesena F.C.", as a phoenix club of A.C. Cesena.

=== Serie D ===
After going bankrupt in 2018, the Associazione Calcio Cesena restarted its activities the following year with a new club called Cesena Football Club. It restarted from Serie D, immediately winning its first championship, and thus rising to Serie C in the 2018–19 season.

They then played five championships in Serie C, from 2019–20 to 2023–24, the year in which he won the Serie C championship, in group B, thus returning to Serie B exactly six years after bankruptcy. In the 2024–25 season he will therefore play his 33rd Serie B championship

=== Cesena F.C. ===
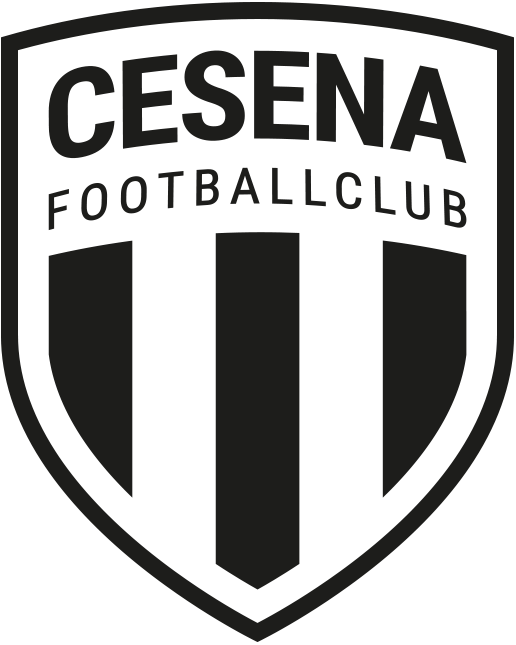
The transitional logo until the agreement with folded AC Cesena was found in late 2018

In July 2018, after the bankruptcy of the main football team of the city, A.C. Cesena, a group of local businessmen acquired Romagna Centro and proposed to rename it Cesena F.C., to act as a phoenix club. However, the image rights of A.C. Cesena were acquired later. The team played a friendly match against Romanian club Universitatea Cluj in the 2018–19 pre-season. In July 2018, Romagna Centro announced that the youth sector would train with former A.C. Cesena players. However, the club was later known as Cesena F.C., and was assigned to Group F of the 2018–19 Serie D.

The club was renamed Cesena Football Club.

In the 2019–20 season, the club competed in Serie C's Girone B.

In the 2023–24 season, Cesena secured promotion to the following season's Serie B as Serie C Girone B champions.

== Recent seasons ==
Season	Division	Tier	Pos	Pl	W	D	L	+	-	P	Cup	Note
as AC Cesena
2016–17	Serie B	II	13	42	12	17	13	51	48	53	Quarterfinals	
2017–18	Serie B	II	13	42	11	17	14	55	61	50	3rd round	Folded post-season due to bankruptcy. Cesena FC, a phoenix club, was admitted to Serie D
as Cesena FC
2018–19	Serie D (Group F)	IV	↑ 1	38	25	8	5	70	29	83	–	Promoted to Serie C
2019–20	Serie C (Group B)	III	13	27	7	9	11	33	42	30	–	
2020–21	Serie C (Group B)	III	7	38	15	12	11	51	42	57	–	Eliminated in the Promotion play-offs 1/16-finals to Matelica
2021–22	Serie C (Group B)	III	3	38	18	13	7	53	31	67	–	Eliminated in the Promotion play-offs 1/8-finals to Monopoli
2022–23	Serie C (Group B)	III	2	38	23	10	5	66	24	79	–	Eliminated in the Promotion play-offs semifinals to Lecco
2023–24	Serie C (Group B)	III	↑ 1	38	30	6	2	80	19	96	1st round	Promoted to Serie B
2024–25	Serie B	II	7	38	14	11	13	46	47	53	Round of 16	Eliminated in the Promotion play-offs quarterfinals to Catanzaro
2025–26	Serie B	II	11	38	12	10	16	45	56	46	1st round	

== Colours and badge ==
The current shirt colors are black and white, so that the nickname of the club is "bianconeri".

== Stadiums ==
The club play their home matches at Stadio Dino Manuzzi, the largest stadium in the city.

The stadium is quite famous in Italy, and has also hosted some Euro 2019 U-21 matches, charity matches and some other events like concerts, such as Rockin'1000.

== Honours ==
=== Leagues ===
- Serie C: 2023–24
- Serie D: 2018–19

== Current squad ==
As of 10 September 2026

Note: Flags indicate national team as defined under FIFA eligibility rules; some limited exceptions apply. Players may hold more than one non-FIFA nationality.

No.	Pos.	Nation	Player
1	GK	ITA	Alessandro Siano
2	DF	AUS	Mark Natta
3	DF	ROU	Antonio David
4	DF	ITA	Jacopo Gelli (on loan from Frosinone)
5	MF	ITA	Luca Schirone (on loan from Pineto)
6	DF	SRB	Mihajlo Ilić (on loan from Bologna)
7	DF	ITA	Gianluca Frabotta
8	MF	ITA	Matteo Francesconi
9	FW	ALB	Cristian Shpendi
10	MF	ITA	Riccardo Pagano
11	FW	ITA	Maat Daniel Caprini (on loan from Fiorentina)
13	GK	ITA	Luca Ferretti
14	FW	NED	Xavello Druiventak
15	DF	ITA	Andrea Ciofi (captain)
16	FW	ITA	Luca D'Andrea (on loan from Sassuolo)

No.	Pos.	Nation	Player
18	DF	ITA	Matteo Guidi
20	MF	ITA	Matteo Casadei
23	DF	ITA	Vittorio Magni
24	DF	ITA	Massimiliano Mangraviti
25	MF	ITA	Dimitri Bisoli
26	DF	ITA	Matteo Piacentini
27	MF	ITA	Marco Dalla Vecchia (on loan from Torino)
32	MF	NOR	Emil Bohinen (on loan from Venezia)
33	GK	USA	Jonathan Klinsmann
39	GK	ITA	Niccolò Fontana
43	FW	ITA	Filippo Bertaccini
80	FW	ITA	Antonio Fiori (on loan from Mantova)
90	GK	ITA	Tommaso Mazzi
91	FW	ITA	Alessandro Debenedetti (on loan from Genoa)

=== Out on loan ===
Note: Flags indicate national team as defined under FIFA eligibility rules; some limited exceptions apply. Players may hold more than one non-FIFA nationality.

No.	Pos.	Nation	Player
—	DF	ITA	Riccardo Biguzzi (at Prato until 30 June 2027)
—	DF	FRA	Mamadou Kebbeh (at Torres until 30 June 2027)
—	DF	ITA	Giulio Manetti (at Lecco until 30 June 2027)
—	DF	ITA	Simone Pieraccini (at Salernitana until 30 June 2027)
—	MF	ITA	Tommaso Arrigoni (at Livorno until 30 June 2027)
—	MF	ITA	Gianmarco Castorri (at Latina until 30 June 2027)

No.	Pos.	Nation	Player
—	FW	ITA	Roberto Ogunseye (at Giugliano until 30 June 2027)
—	FW	ITA	Marco Olivieri (at Arezzo until 30 June 2027)
—	FW	ITA	Giovanni Perini (at Forlì until 30 June 2027)
—	FW	ALB	Frederik Tosku (at Ostiamare until 30 June 2027)
—	FW	SEN	Ibrahima Papa Wade (at Ostiamare until 30 June 2027)

== Technical staff ==
As of 1 July 2026

Position	Staff
Head coach	(Italy) Alessandro Diamanti
Assistant coach	(Italy) Romano Perticone
Athletic coach	(Italy) Giorgio D'Urbano
Goalkeeping coach	(Italy) Federico Agliardi
Assistant athletic coach	(Italy) Luca Lancioni (Italy) Filippo Medda
Technical assistants	(Italy) Massimo Magrini (Italy) Paolo Stringara (Italy) Nicola Capellini
Team manager	(Italy) Matteo Visani
Club manager	(Italy) Alberto Santarelli
Referee caretaker	(Italy) Fiorenzo Treossi
Head of medical staff	(Italy) Giorgio Gandolfi
First team doctors	(Italy) Antonio Argentoni (Italy) Gianluigi Sella
Physiotherapists	(Italy) Costantino Cucciniello (Italy) Francesco Canali (Italy) Stefano Valentini
Nutritionist	(Italy) Michela Lantignotti
