= 2024–25 Pisa SC season =

Pisa SC
2024–25 season
- Owner: (Russia) Alexander Knaster
- Chairman: (Italy) Giuseppe Corrado
- Head Coach: (Italy) Filippo Inzaghi
- Stadium: Arena Garibaldi
- Serie B: 2nd
Home colours	Away colours	Third colours

The 2024–25 season will be Pisa SC's 115th season in existence and the club's sixth consecutive season in the second division of Italian football. In addition to the domestic league, Pisa participated in this season's edition of the Coppa Italia. The season covers the period from 1 July 2024 to 30 June 2025.

== Current squad ==
As of 7 February 2025

Note: Flags indicate national team as defined under FIFA eligibility rules; some limited exceptions apply. Players may hold more than one non-FIFA nationality.

No.	Pos.	Nation	Player
1	GK	BRA	Nícolas
3	DF	ITA	Samuele Angori
4	DF	ITA	Antonio Caracciolo (captain)
5	DF	ITA	Simone Canestrelli
6	MF	ROU	Marius Marin
8	MF	DEN	Malthe Højholt
10	FW	ITA	Emanuel Vignato
11	FW	ITA	Mattéo Tramoni
13	DF	ITA	Christian Sussi
14	FW	DEN	Henrik Meister (on loan from Rennes)
15	MF	GER	Idrissa Touré
17	DF	ROU	Adrian Rus
19	DF	POR	Tomás Esteves
21	MF	NOR	Markus Solbakken (on loan from Sparta Prague)

No.	Pos.	Nation	Player
22	GK	ITA	Leonardo Loria
27	DF	ITA	Alessio Castellini (on loan from Catania)
28	MF	DEN	Oliver Abildgaard (on loan from Como)
30	FW	ITA	Alessandro Arena
32	FW	ITA	Stefano Moreo
33	DF	ITA	Arturo Calabresi
36	MF	ITA	Gabriele Piccinini
37	MF	ALG	Mehdi Léris
45	FW	DEN	Alexander Lind
47	GK	CRO	Adrian Šemper
66	DF	ITA	Leonardo Sernicola (on loan from Cremonese)
80	FW	ROU	Olimpiu Moruțan (on loan from Ankaragücü)
94	DF	ITA	Giovanni Bonfanti (on loan from Atalanta)

=== Other players under contract ===
Note: Flags indicate national team as defined under FIFA eligibility rules; some limited exceptions apply. Players may hold more than one non-FIFA nationality.

No.	Pos.	Nation	Player
—	DF	ITA	Lorenzo Pucci

=== Pisa Primavera ===
As of 16 February 2025

Note: Flags indicate national team as defined under FIFA eligibility rules; some limited exceptions apply. Players may hold more than one non-FIFA nationality.

No.	Pos.	Nation	Player
16	FW	CZE	Louis Buffon
25	FW	ITA	Tommaso Ferrari

No.	Pos.	Nation	Player
26	DF	LTU	Motiejus Šapola
39	FW	ITA	Lorenzo Tosi

=== Out on loan ===
Note: Flags indicate national team as defined under FIFA eligibility rules; some limited exceptions apply. Players may hold more than one non-FIFA nationality.

No.	Pos.	Nation	Player
—	GK	SWE	Johan Guadagno (at Sestri Levante until 30 June 2025)
—	GK	ITA	Alessandro Livieri (at Ascoli until 30 June 2025)
—	GK	CRO	Ante Vuković (at Vis Pesaro until 30 June 2025)
—	DF	ITA	Pietro Beruatto (at Sampdoria until 30 June 2025)
—	DF	ITA	Francesco Coppola (at Vis Pesaro until 30 June 2025)
—	DF	ITA	Andrea Primasso (at Sestri Levante until 30 June 2025)
—	MF	ITA	Riccardo Bassanini (at Giana Erminio until 30 June 2025)
—	MF	ITA	Andrea Beghetto (at Vicenza until 30 June 2025)
—	MF	SLO	Miha Trdan (at Empoli U19 until 30 June 2025)
—	MF	ITA	Mattia Sala (at Pontedera until 30 June 2025)

No.	Pos.	Nation	Player
—	MF	ITA	Mattia Leoncini (at Legnago until 30 June 2025)
—	MF	SLO	Žan Jevšenak (at Oliveirense until 30 June 2025)
—	FW	ITA	Nicholas Bonfanti (at Bari until 30 June 2025)
—	FW	ITA	Elia Giani (at Athens Kallithea until 30 June 2025)
—	FW	ITA	Andrea Pavanello (at Sestri Levante until 30 June 2025)
—	FW	BUL	Mert Durmush (at Sestri Levante until 30 June 2025)
—	FW	FRA	Lisandru Tramoni (at Bastia until 30 June 2025)
—	FW	LTU	Edgaras Dubickas (at Juve Stabia until 30 June 2025)
—	FW	SLO	Jan Mlakar (at Hajduk Split until 30 June 2025)
—	FW	BUL	Adrian Raychev (at Vis Pesaro until 30 June 2025)

== Non-competitive ==
=== Club Friendlies ===
2 August 2024 Friendly	Pisa (Italy)	1–1	(Italy) Inter Milan	Pisa
19:30 CEST	Piccinini 45+1'	Report	Bisseck 90+6'	Stadium: Arena Garibaldi – Stadio Romeo Anconetani

7 August 2024 Friendly	Pisa (Italy)	6–0	(Italy) Tau Altopascio	Pisa
16:00 CEST		Report		Stadium: Arena Garibaldi – Stadio Romeo Anconetani

== Competitive ==
=== Serie B ===
==== League table ====
Pos	Team	Pld	W	D	L	GF	GA	GD	Pts	Promotion, qualification or relegation
1	Sassuolo (C, P)	38	25	7	6	78	38	+40	82	Promotion to Serie A
2	Pisa (P)	38	23	7	8	64	35	+29	76	Promotion to Serie A
3	Spezia	38	17	15	6	59	33	+26	66	Qualification for promotion play-offs semi-finals
4	Cremonese (O, P)	38	16	13	9	62	44	+18	61	Qualification for promotion play-offs semi-finals
5	Juve Stabia	38	14	13	11	42	41	+1	55	Qualification for promotion play-offs preliminary round

Source: Serie BKT
Rules for classification: 1) Points; 2) Head-to-head points; 3) Head-to-head goal difference; 4) Goal difference; 5) Goals scored; 6) Draw.
(Note: Head-to-head record is used only after all the matches between the teams in question have been played)
(C) Champions; (O) Play-off winners; (P) Promoted

==== Results summary ====
Overall								Home						Away					
Pld	W	D	L	GF	GA	GD	Pts	W	D	L	GF	GA	GD	W	D	L	GF	GA	GD
33	20	6	7	56	30	+26	66	11	3	2	31	14	+17	9	3	5	25	16	+9

Last updated: 12 April 2025.
Source: soccerway

==== Results by round ====
Round	1	2	3	4	5	6	7	8	9	10	11	12	13	14	15	16	17	18	19	20	21	22	23	24	25	26	27	28	29	30	31	32	33	34	35	36	37	38
Ground	H	H	A	H	A	H	A	H	A	A	H	A	H	A	H	A	H	A	H	A	H	A	H	A	H	A	H	A	A	H	A	H	A	H	A	H	A	H
Result	D	W	W	W	W	W	L	W	W	D	D	W	W	L	D	W	W	L	W	W	W	D	W	W	L	D	W	L	L	W	W	L	W					
Position	9	2	1	1	1	1	1	1	1	1	1	1	1	3	2	2	2	3	2	2	2	2	2	2	2	2	2	2	2	2	2	2	2					

Updated to match(es) played on 12 April 2025. Source: worldfootball
A = Away; H = Home; W = Win; D = Draw; L = Loss

==== Matches ====
17 August 2024 1	Pisa	2–2	Spezia	Pisa
20:30 CEST	Jevšenak (yellow card) 26'; Touré 45+6'; Moreo (yellow card) 58'; Canestrelli 78'; Bonfanti (yellow card) 80'; Marin (yellow card) 82'	Report	Esposito 21'; Esposito (yellow card) 28'; Bertola 45+2'; Di Serio (yellow card) 68'	Stadium: Arena Garibaldi – Stadio Romeo Anconetani; Attendance: 8,770; Referee: (Italy) Gianluca Manganiello

24 August 2024 2	Pisa	2–0	Palermo	Pisa
20:30 CEST	Nedelcearu 4' (o.g.); Beruatto (yellow card) 51'; Touré (yellow card) 53'; Bonfanti 66'	Report	Pierozzi (yellow card) 4'; Peda (yellow card) 86'	Stadium: Arena Garibaldi – Stadio Romeo Anconetani; Attendance: 8,811; Referee: (Italy) Andrea Colombo

27 August 2024 3	Cittadella	0–3	Pisa	Cittadella
20:30 CEST		Report		Stadium: Stadio Pier Cesare Tombolato

31 August 2024 4	Pisa	2–1	Reggiana	Pisa
20:30 CEST	Tramoni 22'; Bonfanti 49'	Report	Rozzio (yellow card) 16'; Portanova (yellow card) 19'; Reinhart (yellow card) 56'; Sersanti 77'; Okwonkwo (yellow card) 90+1'	Stadium: Arena Garibaldi – Stadio Romeo Anconetani; Attendance: 8,359; Referee: (Italy) Simone Galipò

15 September 2024 5	Salernitana	2–3	Pisa	Salerno
17:30 CEST	Tongya 14'; Stojanović (yellow card) 43'; Verde (yellow card) 45+3'; Dalmonte (yellow card) 90+3'; Simy 90+5' (pen.)	Report	Bonfanti 2' 45+4' (pen.); Bonfanti (yellow card) 33'; Abildgaard (yellow card) 47'; Tramoni 62'	Stadium: Stadio Arechi; Attendance: 15,083; Referee: (Italy) Kevin Bonacina

21 September 2024 6	Pisa	2–1	Brescia	Pisa
15:00 CEST	Piccinini 2'; Abildgaard (yellow card) 33'; Tramoni 78'	Report	Moncini 48'; Bisoli (yellow card) 50'; Borrelli (yellow card) 83'; Adorni (yellow card) 90+2'	Stadium: Arena Garibaldi – Stadio Romeo Anconetani; Attendance: 8,434; Referee: (Italy) Francesco Fourneau

29 September 2024 7	Juve Stabia	2–0	Pisa	Castellammare di Stabia
15:00 CEST	Varnier 12'; Marco Ruggero (yellow card) 77'; Meli (yellow card) 77'; Gabriele Artistico 83' (yellow card) 84'; Matteo Baldi (yellow card) 88'	Report	Caracciolo (yellow card) 85'; Vignato (red card) 90+2'	Stadium: Stadio Romeo Menti; Attendance: 4,548; Referee: (Italy) Daniele Doveri

5 October 2024 8	Pisa	3–1	Cesena	Pisa
15:00 CET	Lind 23'; Canestrelli 38'; Marin (yellow card) 50'; Donnarumma 55' (o.g.); Abildgaard (yellow card) 87'; Bonfanti (yellow card) 90+3'	Report	Celia (yellow card) 12'; Prestia 76'	Stadium: Arena Garibaldi – Stadio Romeo Anconetani; Attendance: 7,915; Referee: (Italy) Paride Tremolada

19 October 2024 9	Südtirol	1–2	Pisa	Bolzano
15:00 CET	Tait 29'; Masiello (yellow card) 64'	Report	Lind 38'; Piccinini (yellow card) 42'; Arena 59' (pen.); Marin (yellow card) 80'; Touré (yellow card) 88'	Stadium: Stadio Druso; Attendance: 4,099; Referee: (Italy) Matteo Marchetti

27 October 2024 10	Frosinone	0–0	Pisa	Frosinone
15:00 CET	Alejandro Cichero (red card) 5'; Marchizza (yellow card) 45+3'; Biraschi (yellow card) 63'; Barcella (yellow card) 90+4'	Report	Rus (yellow card) 32'; Lind (yellow card) 36'; Angori (yellow card) 86'	Stadium: Stadio Benito Stirpe; Attendance: 10,106; Referee: (Italy) Antonio Giua

30 October 2024 11	Pisa	0–0	Catanzaro	Pisa
20:30 CET	Bonfanti (yellow card) 53'; Calabresi (yellow card) 61'; Marin (yellow card) 87'; Caracciolo (yellow card) 90+1'	Report	Pittarello (yellow card) 18'; Coulibaly (yellow card) 74'; Pompetti (red card) 90+3'	Stadium: Arena Garibaldi – Stadio Romeo Anconetani; Attendance: 7,859; Referee: (Italy) Daniele Perenzoni

3 November 2024 12	Cremonese	1–3	Pisa	Cremona
15:00 CET	Vázquez 37'; Barbieri (yellow card) 75'	Report	Marin 26'; Rus (yellow card) 43'; Piccinini 45+1'; Tramoni 57'	Stadium: Stadio Giovanni Zini; Attendance: 10,371; Referee: (Italy) Ivano Pezzuto

9 November 2024 13	Pisa	3–0	Sampdoria	Pisa
15:00 CET	Canestrelli (yellow card) 34'; Lind 38'; Tramoni 52'; Angori 85'; Marin (yellow card) 87'	Report	Borini (yellow card) 76'; Bereszyński (yellow card) 87'	Stadium: Arena Garibaldi – Stadio Romeo Anconetani; Attendance: 8,745; Referee: (Italy) Luca Pairetto

23 November 2024 14	Carrarese	1–0	Pisa	Carrara
15:00 CET	Zuelli (yellow card) 34'; Giovane (yellow card) 55'; Bouah (yellow card) 66' (goal) 89'	Report	Touré (red card) 26'	Stadium: Stadio dei Marmi; Attendance: 4,224; Referee: (Italy) Marco Guida

1 December 2024 15	Pisa	2–2	Cosenza	Pisa
15:00 CET	Lind 5'; Piccinini 26'	Report	Dalle Mura (yellow card) 21'; Micai (yellow card) 37'; Mazzocchi 72'; Ricci (yellow card) 82'; Tommaso Fumagalli 90+2' (yellow card) 90+3'	Stadium: Arena Garibaldi – Stadio Romeo Anconetani; Attendance: 8,522; Referee: (Italy) Marco Di Bello

7 December 2024 16	Mantova	2–3	Pisa	Mantua
15:00 CET	Mancuso 28' 54'; Stefano Cella (yellow card) 88'	Report	Angori 8'; Lind 12' (yellow card) 65'; Marin (yellow card) 43'; Touré (yellow card) 49'; Moreo 66'; Calabresi (yellow card) 89'	Stadium: Stadio Danilo Martelli; Attendance: 7,722; Referee: (Italy) Simone Sozza

13 December 2024 17	Pisa	2–0	Bari	Pisa
20:30 CET	Moreo 49'; Piccinini 68'; Canestrelli (yellow card) 73'; Calabresi (yellow card) 80'	Report	Vicari (yellow card) 31'; Favasuli (yellow card) 45'; Maita (yellow card) 80'	Stadium: Arena Garibaldi – Stadio Romeo Anconetani; Attendance: 7,937; Referee: (Italy) Luca Massimi

21 December 2024 18	Modena	1–0	Pisa	Modena
17:15 CET	Caso 57'	Report	Angori (yellow card) 26'; Rus (yellow card) 38'; Caracciolo (yellow card) 41'; Touré (yellow card) 75'	Stadium: Stadio Alberto Braglia; Attendance: 9,646; Referee: (Italy) Alberto Santoro

26 December 2024 19	Pisa	3–1	Sassuolo	Pisa
12:30 CET	Caracciolo (yellow card) 16'; Tramoni 24' 61'; Touré 33'	Report	Doig (yellow card) 58'; Berardi (yellow card) 64'; Pierini 70'; Muharemović (yellow card) 80'	Stadium: Arena Garibaldi – Stadio Romeo Anconetani; Attendance: 9,300; Referee: (Italy) Rosario Abisso

29 December 2024 20	Sampdoria	0–1	Pisa	Genoa
19:30 CET	Ioannou (yellow card) 82'; Vieira (yellow card) 90+3'	Report	Højholt (yellow card) 43'; Marin (yellow card) 52'; Bonfanti (yellow card) 55'; Tramoni 70'	Stadium: Stadio Luigi Ferraris; Attendance: 21,766; Referee: (Italy) Juan Luca Sacchi

13 January 2025 21	Pisa	2–1	Carrarese	Pisa
20:30 CET	Canestrelli 22'; Marin (yellow card) 65'; Moreo (yellow card) 69'; Caracciolo 87'	Report	Finotto 61'; Oliana (yellow card) 90+1'	Stadium: Arena Garibaldi – Stadio Romeo Anconetani; Attendance: 8,428; Referee: (Italy) Francesco Cosso

19 January 2025 22	Catanzaro	0–0	Pisa	Catanzaro
15:00 CET	Scognamillo (yellow card) 27'; Pontisso (yellow card) 82'	Report	Caracciolo (yellow card) 5'; Calabresi (yellow card) 85'	Stadium: Stadio Nicola Ceravolo; Attendance: 8,293; Referee: (Italy) Federico La Penna

26 January 2025 23	Pisa	1–0	Salernitana	Pisa
15:00 CET	Marin (red card) 14'; Moreo 56'; Rus (yellow card) 59'	Report	Ghiglione (yellow card) 5'; Lochoshvili (yellow card) 22'; Girelli (yellow card) 47'; Ferrari (yellow card) 55'	Stadium: Arena Garibaldi – Stadio Romeo Anconetani; Attendance: 8,658; Referee: (Italy) Ivano Pezzuto

31 January 2025 24	Palermo	1–2	Pisa	Palermo
20:30 CET	Brunori 59' (yellow card) 61'	Report	Rus 13' (pen.); Caracciolo (yellow card) 23'; Lind 26'; Meister (yellow card) 65'; Touré (yellow card) 72'	Stadium: Stadio Renzo Barbera; Attendance: 21,585; Referee: (Italy) Kevin Bonacina

8 February 2025 25	Pisa	0–1	Cittadella	Pisa
15:00 CET	Rus (yellow card) 5'; Lind (red card) 83'	Report	Capradossi (yellow card) 30'; Tessiore (yellow card) 65'; Pandolfi 83' (yellow card) 83'	Stadium: Arena Garibaldi – Stadio Romeo Anconetani; Attendance: 7,382; Referee: (Italy) Matteo Marchetti

16 February 2025 26	Cesena	1–1	Pisa	Cesena
17:15 CET	Donnarumma (red card) 49'; Emanuele Adamo (yellow card) 53'; Mendicino (yellow card) 71'; Klinsmann (yellow card) 73'; La Gumina 79'; Flavio Russo (yellow card) 85'	Report	Touré 33' (yellow card) 57'; Canestrelli (yellow card) 39'; Meister (yellow card) 41'; Angori (yellow card) 90+2'	Stadium: Orogel Stadium Dino Manuzzi; Attendance: 11,376; Referee: (Italy) Fabio Maresca

22 February 2025 27	Pisa	3–1	Juve Stabia	Pisa
15:00 CET	Tramoni 64' (pen.); Moruțan 66'; Moreo 77'; Rus (yellow card) 79'; Sernicola (yellow card) 87'	Report	Candellone (red card) 36'; Quaranta (yellow card) 42'; Marin 57' (o.g.); Floriani Mussolini (yellow card) 59'	Stadium: Arena Garibaldi – Stadio Romeo Anconetani; Attendance: 7,808; Referee: (Italy) Gianluca Aureliano

1 March 2025 28	Sassuolo	1–0	Pisa	Reggio Emilia
17:15 CET	Mazzitelli (yellow card) 19'; Moro 23'	Report		Stadium: Mapei Stadium – Città del Tricolore; Attendance: 11,241; Referee: (Italy) Davide Ghersini

9 March 2025 29	Spezia	3–2	Pisa	La Spezia
15:00 CET	Esposito 45'; Esposito 58'; Wiśniewski 65'; Matějů (yellow card) 73'; Reca (yellow card) 88'	Report	Wiśniewski 37' (o.g.); Meister (yellow card) 43' (goal) 47'; Canestrelli (yellow card) 74'; Abildgaard (yellow card) 86'; Lind (yellow card) 90+4'	Stadium: Stadio Alberto Picco; Attendance: 10,880; Referee: (Italy) Maurizio Mariani

16 March 2025 30	Pisa	3–1	Mantova	Pisa
15:00 CET	Caracciolo (yellow card) 6' (goal) 49'; Tramoni 12' 65'; Angori (yellow card) 28'	Report	Wieser (yellow card) 15'; Mancuso 23'; Paoletti (red card) 86'	Stadium: Arena Garibaldi – Stadio Romeo Anconetani; Attendance: 9,023; Referee: (Italy) Kevin Bonacina

=== Coppa Italia ===
12 August 2024 First Round	Frosinone	0–3	Pisa	Frosinone
18:00 CEST	Vural (yellow card) 67'	Report	Tramoni 28'; Marin (yellow card) 38'; Bonfanti 44'; Arena 89'	Stadium: Stadio Benito Stirpe; Attendance: 9,384; Referee: (Italy) Francesco Fourneau

25 September 2024 Second Round	Pisa	0–1	Cesena	Pisa
16:00 CEST	Lind (yellow card) 36'; Calabresi (yellow card) 51'; Bonfanti (yellow card) 57'	Report	Simone Pieraccini (yellow card) 10'; Emanuele Adamo (yellow card) 44'; Celia 54'; Mendicino (yellow card) 65'; Ciofi (yellow card) 80'	Stadium: Arena Garibaldi – Stadio Romeo Anconetani; Attendance: 3,347; Referee: (Italy) Daniele Rutella
