= 2021–22 Coppa Italia =

Tournament details
- Country: Italy
- Dates: 7 August 2021 – 11 May 2022
- Teams: 44

Final positions
- Champions: Internazionale (8th title)
- Runners-up: Juventus

Tournament statistics
- Matches played: 46
- Goals scored: 156 (3.39 per match)
- Top goal scorer: Dušan Vlahović (4 goals)

The 2021–22 Coppa Italia (branded as the Coppa Italia Frecciarossa for sponsorship reasons from the second round) was the 75th edition of the national domestic tournament.

The number of participating teams was reduced from the 78 of the previous season to 44 clubs.

Juventus were the defending champions. They were defeated 4–2 by Internazionale in the final after extra time; it was Inter's eighth Coppa Italia title, having won their seventh cup title in 2011.

== Participating teams ==
Serie A The 20 clubs of the 2021–22 season	Serie B The 20 clubs of the 2021–22 season	Serie C Four clubs of the 2021–22 season
Atalanta; Bologna; Cagliari; Fiorentina; Empoli; Genoa; Hellas Verona; Internazionale; Juventus; Lazio; Milan; Napoli; Roma; Salernitana; Sampdoria; Sassuolo; Spezia; Torino; Udinese; Venezia	Alessandria; Ascoli; Benevento; Brescia; Cittadella; Como; Cosenza; Cremonese; Crotone; Frosinone; Lecce; Monza; Parma; Perugia; Pisa; Pordenone; Reggina; SPAL; Ternana; Vicenza	Avellino; Catanzaro; Padova; Südtirol

== Format and seeding ==
Teams entered the competition at various stages, as follows:

- First phase (one-legged fixtures)
  - Preliminary round: four teams from Serie C and 4 Serie B teams started the tournament
  - First round: the four winners were joined by 16 Serie B teams and 12 teams from Serie A
  - Second round: the 16 winners faced each other
- Second phase
  - Round of 16 (one-legged): the eight winners were joined by Serie A clubs, seeded 1–8
  - Quarter-finals (one-legged): the eight winners faced each other
  - Semi-finals (two-legged): the four winners faced each other
  - Final (one-legged): the two winners faced each other

== Round dates ==
The schedule of each round was announced on 12 July 2021.

Phase	Round	Clubs remaining	Clubs involved	From previous round	Entries in this round	First leg	Second leg
First stage	Preliminary round	44	8	none	8	7–8 August 2021	
First stage	First round	40	32	4	28	13–16 August 2021	
First stage	Second round	24	16	16	none	14–16 December 2021	
Final stage	Round of 16	16	16	8	8	12–20 January 2022	
Final stage	Quarter-finals	8	8	8	none	8–10 February 2022	
Final stage	Semi-finals	4	4	4	none	1–2 March 2022	19–20 April 2022
Final stage	Final	2	2	2	none	11 May 2022	

== First stage ==
=== Preliminary round ===
A total of 8 teams from Serie B and Serie C competed in this round, 4 of which advanced to the first round. Date and time were released on 21 July 2021.

7 August 2021	Como (2)	2–2 (a.e.t.) (3–4 p)	Catanzaro (3)	Novara
19:00 CEST	Chajia 32', 56'	Report	Carlini 52'; Verna 88'	Stadium: Stadio Silvio Piola; Attendance: 346; Referee: Matteo Marcenaro
	Penalties
	Gabrielloni (penalty scored); Kabashi (penalty scored); Walker (penalty scored); Dkidak (penalty missed); Bellemo (penalty missed)		(penalty scored) Carlini; (penalty scored) Vandeputte; (penalty missed) Verna; (penalty scored) Bombagi; (penalty scored) Vázquez

8 August 2021	Ternana (2)	1–1 (a.e.t.) (4–3 p)	Avellino (3)	Terni
18:30 CEST	Falletti 63'	Report	D'Angelo 25'	Stadium: Stadio Libero Liberati; Attendance: 1,498; Referee: Niccolò Baroni
	Penalties
	Paghera (penalty missed); Capone (penalty missed); Pettinari (penalty scored); Mazzocchi (penalty scored); Salzano (penalty scored); Furlan (penalty scored)		(penalty scored) Plescia; (penalty scored) Aloi; (penalty scored) Tito; (penalty missed) De Francesco; (penalty missed) Maniero; (penalty missed) Rizzo

8 August 2021	Perugia (2)	1–0	Südtirol (3)	Perugia
19:00 CEST	Carretta 47'	Report		Stadium: Stadio Renato Curi; Attendance: 1,100; Referee: Gianpiero Miele

8 August 2021	Padova (3)	0–2 (a.e.t.)	Alessandria (2)	Padova
20:30 CEST		Report	Corazza 102'; Orlando 106'	Stadium: Stadio Euganeo; Attendance: 401; Referee: Daniele Minelli
Note: Tie reversed from the original draw.

=== First round ===
A total of 32 teams (4 winners from the preliminary round, the remaining 16 teams from Serie B and 12 Serie A teams seeded 9–20) competed in this round, 16 of which advanced to the second round.

13 August 2021	Pordenone (2)	1–3	Spezia (1)	Lignano Sabbiadoro
17:45 CEST	Folorunsho 51' (pen.)	Report	Erlić 39'; Nikolaou 45+3'; Colley 83' (pen.)	Stadium: Stadio Guido Teghil; Attendance: 600; Referee: Davide Ghersini
Note: Tie reversed from the original draw.

13 August 2021	Genoa (1)	3–2	Perugia (2)	Genoa
18:00 CEST	Criscito 26' (pen.); Chichizola 41' (o.g.); Kallon 88'	Report	Carretta 2'; Lisi 10'	Stadium: Stadio Luigi Ferraris; Attendance: 522; Referee: Antonio Rapuano

13 August 2021	Udinese (1)	3–1	Ascoli (2)	Udine
20:45 CEST	Pereyra 11', 55'; Molina 53'	Report	D'Orazio 90+2'	Stadium: Dacia Arena; Attendance: 2,604; Referee: Matteo Gariglio

13 August 2021	Fiorentina (1)	4–0	Cosenza (2)	Florence
21:00 CEST	Vlahović 4', 45+4'; González 37'; Venuti 51'	Report		Stadium: Stadio Artemio Franchi; Attendance: 3,600; Referee: Giacomo Camplone

14 August 2021	Benevento (2)	2–1 (a.e.t.)	SPAL (2)	Benevento
17:45 CEST	Improta 32'; Moncini 120+5' (pen.)	Report	Moncini 90+5' (o.g.)	Stadium: Stadio Ciro Vigorito; Attendance: 686; Referee: Francesco Cosso

14 August 2021	Cittadella (2)	2–1	Monza (2)	Cittadella
18:00 CEST	Okwonkwo 8'; Tounkara 40'	Report	Carlos 26'	Stadium: Stadio Pier Cesare Tombolato; Attendance: 530; Referee: Antonio Di Martino

14 August 2021	Hellas Verona (1)	3–0	Catanzaro (3)	Verona
20:45 CEST	Günter 23'; Fazio 33' (o.g.); Lazović 42'	Report		Stadium: Stadio Marcantonio Bentegodi; Attendance: 1,784; Referee: Luca Pairetto

14 August 2021	Cagliari (1)	3–1	Pisa (2)	Cagliari
21:00 CEST	Marin 28'; Caracciolo 36' (o.g.); Deiola 45+3'	Report	Masucci 67'	Stadium: Sardegna Arena; Attendance: 2,620; Referee: Gianluca Manganiello

15 August 2021	Empoli (1)	4–2	Vicenza (2)	Empoli
17:45 CEST	Bajrami 11'; Haas 30'; Mancuso 37'; Crociata 88'	Report	Dalmonte 39'; Lanzafame 56'	Stadium: Stadio Carlo Castellani; Attendance: 0 Referee: Juan Luca Sacchi

15 August 2021	Parma (2)	1–3	Lecce (2)	Parma
18:00 CEST	Brunetta 7'	Report	Coda 9', 76'; Tuia 40'	Stadium: Stadio Ennio Tardini; Attendance: 1,306; Referee: Marco Serra

15 August 2021	Venezia (1)	1–1 (a.e.t.) (8–7 p)	Frosinone (2)	Ferrara
20:45 CEST	Di Mariano 101' (pen.)	Report	Gori 93'	Stadium: Stadio Paolo Mazza; Attendance: 250; Referee: Alessandro Prontrera
	Penalties
	Sigurðsson (penalty scored); Heymans (penalty scored); Di Mariano (penalty scored); Tessmann (penalty missed); Vacca (penalty scored); Ceccaroni (penalty scored); Johnses (penalty scored); Caldara (penalty scored); Ebuehi (penalty scored)		(penalty scored) Ciano; (penalty missed) Maiello; (penalty scored) Zampano; (penalty scored) Iemmello; (penalty scored) Vitale; (penalty scored) Brighenti; (penalty scored) Szymiński; (penalty scored) Zerbin; (penalty missed) Gatti

15 August 2021	Torino (1)	0–0 (a.e.t.) (4–1 p)	Cremonese (2)	Turin
21:00 CEST		Report		Stadium: Stadio Olimpico Grande Torino; Attendance: 1,484; Referee: Giovanni Ayroldi
	Penalties
	Mandragora (penalty scored); Verdi (penalty scored); Rauti (penalty scored); Aina (penalty scored)		(penalty missed) Ciofani; (penalty scored) Vido; (penalty missed) Castagnetti

16 August 2021	Crotone (2)	2–2 (a.e.t.) (4–2 p)	Brescia (2)	Crotone
17:45 CEST	Vulić 26'; Mulattieri 77'	Report	Van de Loi 46'; Bajić 67'	Stadium: Stadio Ezio Scida; Attendance: 1,500; Referee: Luca Massimi
	Penalties
	Molina (penalty scored); Benali (penalty scored); Mogoș (penalty scored); Vulić (penalty scored)		(penalty scored) Bajić; (penalty missed) Moreo; (penalty missed) Ndoj; (penalty scored) Spalek

16 August 2021	Bologna (1)	4–5	Ternana (2)	Bologna
18:00 CEST	Domínguez 38'; Arnautović 56'; Soriano 58'; Orsolini 76' (pen.)	Report	Agazzi 6'; Donnarumma 21'; Peralta 40', 54'; Falletti 50' (pen.)	Stadium: Stadio Renato Dall'Ara; Attendance: 5,360; Referee: Luca Zufferli

16 August 2021	Salernitana (1)	2–0	Reggina (2)	Salerno
20:45 CEST	Bonazzoli 45+2', 52'	Report		Stadium: Stadio Arechi; Attendance: 2,476; Referee: Francesco Fourneau

16 August 2021	Sampdoria (1)	3–2	Alessandria (2)	Genoa
21:00 CEST	Quagliarella 28'; Gabbiadini 47'; Thorsby 52'	Report	Chiarello 8'; Corazza 45' (pen.)	Stadium: Stadio Luigi Ferraris; Attendance: 1,249; Referee: Andrea Colombo

=== Second round ===
The 16 winning teams from the first round competed in the second round, 8 of which advanced to the round of 16.

14 December 2021	Venezia (1)	3–1	Ternana (2)	Venice
15:00 CET	Heymans 49'; Črnigoj 66'; Forte 81'	Report	Pettinari 53'	Stadium: Stadio Pier Luigi Penzo; Attendance: 5,219; Referee: Daniele Minelli

14 December 2021	Udinese (1)	4–0	Crotone (2)	Udine
18:00 CET	Pussetto 20', 62'; De Maio 28'; Success 41' (pen.)	Report		Stadium: Dacia Arena; Attendance: 1,291; Referee: Matteo Gualtieri

14 December 2021	Genoa (1)	1–0	Salernitana (1)	Genoa
21:00 CET	Ekuban 76'	Report		Stadium: Stadio Luigi Ferraris; Referee: Marco Serra

15 December 2021	Hellas Verona (1)	3–4	Empoli (1)	Verona
15:00 CET	Cancellieri 18'; Ilić 86'; Ragusa 88'	Report	La Mantia 15'; Mancuso 66' (pen.), 70'; Bajrami 74'	Stadium: Stadio Marcantonio Bentegodi; Attendance: 1,101; Referee: Federico Dionisi

15 December 2021	Cagliari (1)	3–1	Cittadella (2)	Cagliari
18:00 CET	Deiola 16'; Ceter 40'; Pereiro 64'	Report	Donnarumma 85'	Stadium: Sardegna Arena; Attendance: 2,797; Referee: Maria Ferrieri

15 December 2021	Fiorentina (1)	2–1	Benevento (2)	Florence
21:00 CET	Milenković 19'; Sottil 47'	Report	Moncini 51'	Stadium: Stadio Artemio Franchi; Attendance: 13,800; Referee: Luca Zufferli

16 December 2021	Spezia (1)	0–2	Lecce (2)	Cesena
18:00 CET		Report	Listkowski 43'; Calabresi 55'	Stadium: Orogel Stadium; Attendance: 1,838; Referee: Valerio Marini

16 December 2021	Sampdoria (1)	2–1	Torino (1)	Genoa
21:00 CET	Quagliarella 16' (pen.); Verre 60'	Report	Mandragora 54' (pen.)	Stadium: Stadio Luigi Ferraris; Attendance: 3,124; Referee: Marco Piccinini

== Final stage ==
=== Bracket ===
Round of 16
Atalanta	2
Venezia	0
Napoli	2
Fiorentina (a.e.t.)	5
Juventus	4
Sampdoria	1
Sassuolo	1
Cagliari	0
Milan (a.e.t.)	3
Genoa	1
Lazio (a.e.t.)	1
Udinese	0
Internazionale (a.e.t.)	3
Empoli	2
Roma	3
Lecce	1

Quarter-finals
Atalanta	2
Fiorentina	3
Juventus	2
Sassuolo	1
Milan	4
Lazio	0
Internazionale	2
Roma	0

Semi-finals
Fiorentina	0	0	0
Juventus	1	2	3
Milan	0	0	0
Internazionale	0	3	3

Final
Juventus	2
Internazionale (a.e.t.)	4

=== Round of 16 ===
The round of 16 matches were played between the eight winners from the second round and clubs seeded 1–8 in 2020–21 Serie A.

Lecce were the only Serie B club in this round.

12 January 2022	Atalanta (1)	2–0	Venezia (1)	Bergamo
17:30 CET (UTC+1)	Muriel 12'; Mæhle 88'	Report		Stadium: Gewiss Stadium; Attendance: 2,757; Referee: Ivano Pezzuto

13 January 2022	Napoli (1)	2–5 (a.e.t.)	Fiorentina (1)	Naples
18:00 CET (UTC+1)	Mertens 44'; Petagna 90+5'	Report	Vlahović 41'; Biraghi 57'; Venuti 105+1'; Piątek 108'; Maleh 119'	Stadium: Stadio Diego Armando Maradona; Attendance: 4,500; Referee: Giovanni Ayroldi

13 January 2022	Milan (1)	3–1 (a.e.t.)	Genoa (1)	Milan
21:00 CET (UTC+1)	Giroud 74'; Leão 102'; Saelemaekers 112'	Report	Østigård 17'	Stadium: San Siro; Attendance: 13,325; Referee: Gianluca Aureliano

18 January 2022	Lazio (1)	1–0 (a.e.t.)	Udinese (1)	Rome
17:30 CET (UTC+1)	Immobile 106'	Report		Stadium: Stadio Olimpico; Referee: Daniele Minelli

18 January 2022	Juventus (1)	4–1	Sampdoria (1)	Turin
21:00 CET (UTC+1)	Cuadrado 25'; Rugani 52'; Dybala 67'; Morata 77' (pen.)	Report	Conti 63'	Stadium: Juventus Stadium; Attendance: 5,000; Referee: Francesco Fourneau

19 January 2022	Sassuolo (1)	1–0	Cagliari (1)	Reggio Emilia
17:30 CET (UTC+1)	Harroui 18'	Report		Stadium: Mapei Stadium – Città del Tricolore; Attendance: 850; Referee: Matteo Marchetti

19 January 2022	Internazionale (1)	3–2 (a.e.t.)	Empoli (1)	Milan
21:00 CET (UTC+1)	Sánchez 13'; Ranocchia 90+1'; Sensi 104'	Report	Bajrami 61'; Radu 76' (o.g.)	Stadium: San Siro; Attendance: 5,000; Referee: Juan Luca Sacchi

20 January 2022	Roma (1)	3–1	Lecce (2)	Rome
21:00 CET (UTC+1)	Kumbulla 40'; Abraham 54'; Shomurodov 81'	Report	Calabresi 14'	Stadium: Stadio Olimpico; Attendance: 5,000; Referee: Manuel Volpi

=== Quarter-finals ===
The quarter-final matches were played between clubs advancing from the round of 16.

8 February 2022	Internazionale (1)	2–0	Roma (1)	Milan
21:00 CET (UTC+1)	Džeko 2'; Sánchez 68'	Report		Stadium: San Siro; Attendance: 38,000; Referee: Marco Di Bello

9 February 2022	Milan (1)	4–0	Lazio (1)	Milan
21:00 CET (UTC+1)	Leão 24'; Giroud 41', 45+1'; Kessié 79'	Report		Stadium: San Siro; Attendance: 26,947; Referee: Simone Sozza

10 February 2022	Atalanta (1)	2–3	Fiorentina (1)	Bergamo
18:00 CET (UTC+1)	Zappacosta 30'; Boga 56'	Report	Piątek 9' (pen.), 71'; Milenković 90+4'	Stadium: Stadio Atleti Azzurri d'Italia; Attendance: 7,425; Referee: Michael Fabbri

10 February 2022	Juventus (1)	2–1	Sassuolo (1)	Turin
21:00 CET (UTC+1)	Dybala 3'; Ruan 88' (o.g.)	Report	Traorè 24'	Stadium: Juventus Stadium; Attendance: 16,111; Referee: Livio Marinelli

=== Semi-finals ===
Semi-finals (a two-legged round) were played between clubs advancing from the quarter-finals.

==== First leg ====
1 March 2022	Milan (1)	0–0	Internazionale (1)	Milan
21:00 CET (UTC+1)		Report		Stadium: San Siro; Attendance: 53,881; Referee: Maurizio Mariani

2 March 2022	Fiorentina (1)	0–1	Juventus (1)	Florence
21:00 CET (UTC+1)		Report	Venuti 90+2' (o.g.)	Stadium: Stadio Artemio Franchi; Attendance: 28,039; Referee: Marco Guida

==== Second leg ====
19 April 2022	Internazionale (1)	3–0 (3–0 agg.)	Milan (1)	Milan
21:00 CEST (UTC+2)	Martínez 4', 40'; Gosens 82'	Report		Stadium: San Siro; Attendance: 74,508; Referee: Maurizio Mariani

20 April 2022	Juventus (1)	2–0 (3–0 agg.)	Fiorentina (1)	Turin
21:00 CEST (UTC+2)	Bernardeschi 32'; Danilo 90+4'	Report		Stadium: Juventus Stadium; Attendance: 32,109; Referee: Daniele Doveri

=== Final ===
11 May 2022
21:00 CEST

Juventus	2–4 (a.e.t.)	Internazionale
Alex Sandro 50'; Vlahović 52'	Report	Barella 7'; Çalhanoğlu 80' (pen.); Perišić 99' (pen.), 102'

Stadio Olimpico, Rome
Attendance: 67,944
Referee: Paolo Valeri

== Top goalscorers ==
Rank	Player	Club	Goals
1	(Serbia) Dušan Vlahović	Fiorentina/Juventus	4
2	(Albania) Nedim Bajrami	Empoli	3
2	(France) Olivier Giroud	Milan	3
2	(Italy) Leonardo Mancuso	Empoli	3
2	(Poland) Krzysztof Piątek	Fiorentina	3
6	(Italy) Federico Bonazzoli	Salernitana	2
6	(Italy) Arturo Calabresi	Lecce	2
6	(Italy) Mirko Carretta	Perugia	2
6	(Belgium) Moutir Chajia	Como	2
6	(Italy) Massimo Coda	Lecce	2
6	(Italy) Simone Corazza	Alessandria	2
6	(Italy) Alessandro Deiola	Cagliari	2
6	(Argentina) Paulo Dybala	Juventus	2
6	(Uruguay) César Falletti	Ternana	2
6	(Portugal) Rafael Leão	Milan	2
6	(Argentina) Lautaro Martínez	Internazionale	2
6	(Serbia) Nikola Milenković	Fiorentina	2
6	(Italy) Gabriele Moncini	Benevento	2
6	(Argentina) Diego Peralta	Ternana	2
6	(Argentina) Roberto Pereyra	Udinese	2
6	(Croatia) Ivan Perišić	Internazionale	2
6	(Argentina) Ignacio Pussetto	Udinese	2
6	(Italy) Fabio Quagliarella	Sampdoria	2
6	(Chile) Alexis Sánchez	Internazionale	2
6	(Italy) Lorenzo Venuti	Fiorentina	2
