= 2023–24 Pisa SC season =

Pisa SC
2023–24 season
- Manager: Alberto Aquilani
- Stadium: Arena Garibaldi
- Serie B: 13th
- Coppa Italia: Round of 64
- Top goalscorer: League: Mattia Valoti (10); All: Mattia Valoti (10)
Home colours	Away colours	Third colours

The 2023–24 season was Pisa SC's 114th season in existence and the club's fifth consecutive season in the second division of Italian football. In addition to the domestic league, Pisa participated in this season's edition of the Coppa Italia. The season covers the period from 1 July 2023 to 30 June 2024.

== Players ==
=== First-team squad ===
As of 1 September 2023

Note: Flags indicate national team as defined under FIFA eligibility rules; some limited exceptions apply. Players may hold more than one non-FIFA nationality.

No.	Pos.	Nation	Player
1	GK	BRA	Nícolas
3	DF	FRA	Maxime Leverbe
4	DF	ITA	Antonio Caracciolo
5	DF	ITA	Simone Canestrelli
6	DF	ISL	Hjörtur Hermannsson
7	FW	FRA	Lisandru Tramoni
8	MF	ROU	Marius Marin (Captain)
9	FW	ITA	Ettore Gliozzi
10	FW	VEN	Ernesto Torregrossa
11	MF	FRA	Mattéo Tramoni
12	GK	CRO	Ante Vuković
15	MF	GER	Idrissa Touré
16	MF	HUN	Ádám Nagy
17	FW	SLO	Jan Mlakar
19	DF	POR	Tomás Esteves
20	DF	ITA	Pietro Beruatto

No.	Pos.	Nation	Player
22	GK	ITA	Leonardo Loria
23	FW	ITA	Emanuel Vignato
24	MF	CRO	Roko Jureškin
26	FW	ITA	Gaetano Masucci
27	MF	ITA	Mattia Valoti (on loan from Monza)
28	FW	ITA	Alessandro Arena
30	MF	ITA	Alessandro De Vitis
32	FW	ITA	Stefano Moreo
33	DF	ITA	Arturo Calabresi
34	GK	ITA	Matteo Campani
36	FW	ITA	Gabriele Piccinini
40	MF	POR	Miguel Veloso
42	DF	ITA	Tommaso Barbieri (on loan from Juventus)
51	MF	ITA	Andrea Barberis
77	MF	ITA	Marco D'Alessandro (on loan from Monza)

=== Other players under contract ===
Note: Flags indicate national team as defined under FIFA eligibility rules; some limited exceptions apply. Players may hold more than one non-FIFA nationality.

No.	Pos.	Nation	Player
—	DF	ITA	Andrea Beghetto

=== Out on loan ===
Note: Flags indicate national team as defined under FIFA eligibility rules; some limited exceptions apply. Players may hold more than one non-FIFA nationality.

No.	Pos.	Nation	Player
—	GK	ITA	Alessandro Livieri (at Catania until 30 June 2024)
—	GK	SWE	Johan Guadagno (at Fiorenzuola until 30 June 2024)
—	DF	ROU	Adrian Rus (at Pafos until 30 June 2024)
—	MF	ITA	Davide Di Quinzio (at Fiorenzuola until 30 June 2024)
—	MF	MDA	Artur Ioniță (at Lecco until 30 June 2024)
—	MF	ITA	Salvatore Santoro (at Pro Vercelli until 30 June 2024)
—	MF	ITA	Christian Sussi (at Fiorenzuola until 30 June 2024)

No.	Pos.	Nation	Player
—	MF	ITA	Emanuele Zuelli (at Carrarese until 30 June 2024)
—	FW	LTU	Edgaras Dubickas (at Catania until 30 June 2024)
—	FW	ITA	Elia Giani (at Legnago until 30 June 2024)
—	FW	ITA	Lorenzo Lucca (at Udinese until 30 June 2024)
—	FW	SEN	Assane Seck (at Fiorenzuola until 30 June 2024)
—	FW	ITA	Giuseppe Sibilli (at Bari until 30 June 2024)
—	FW	GAM	Bamba Susso (at Aluminij until 30 June 2024)

== Transfers ==
=== In ===
Pos.	Player	Transferred from	Fee	Date	Source

=== Out ===
Pos.	Player	Transferred to	Fee	Date	Source

== Competitions ==
=== Overview ===
Competition	First match	Last match	Starting round	Final position	Record							
Competition	First match	Last match	Starting round	Final position	Pld	W	D	L	GF	GA	GD	Win %
Serie B	August 2023	May 2024	Matchday 1		12	3	4	5	11	13	−2	25.00
Coppa Italia	11 August 2023		Round of 64	Round of 64	1	0	0	1	0	1	−1	0.00
Total					13	3	4	6	11	14	−3	23.08

Last updated: 4 November 2023
Source: Competitions

=== Serie B ===
==== League table ====
Pos	Team	Pld	W	D	L	GF	GA	GD	Pts
11	Reggiana	38	10	17	11	38	45	−7	47 (Note: Head-to-head points: Cosenza 11, Modena 11, Reggiana 7, Südtirol 3. Head-to-head goal difference: Cosenza +6, Modena +2.)
12	Südtirol	38	12	11	15	46	48	−2	47
13	Pisa	38	11	13	14	51	54	−3	46 (Note: Pisa finished ahead of Cittadella on head-to-head points: Pisa 2–1 Cittadella, Cittadella 0–1 Pisa.)
14	Cittadella	38	11	13	14	40	47	−7	46
15	Spezia	38	9	17	12	36	49	−13	44

Source: Soccerway (in English)
Rules for classification: 1) Points; 2) Head-to-head points; 3) Head-to-head goal difference; 4) Goal difference; 5) Goals scored; 6) Draw.
(Note: Head-to-head record is used only after all the matches between the teams in question have been played)

==== Results summary ====
Overall								Home						Away					
Pld	W	D	L	GF	GA	GD	Pts	W	D	L	GF	GA	GD	W	D	L	GF	GA	GD
12	3	4	5	11	13	−2	13	1	2	3	7	9	−2	2	2	2	4	4	0

Last updated: 4 November 2023.

==== Results by round ====
Round	1	2	3	4	5	6	7	8	9	10	11	12
Ground	H	A	H	A	H	A	A	H	A	H	A	H
Result	L	W	L	L	D	W	D	L	D	W	L	D
Position												

Updated to match(es) played on 4 November 2023. Source:
A = Away; H = Home; W = Win; D = Draw; L = Loss

==== Matches ====
The league fixtures were unveiled on 11 July 2023.

25 August 2023 2	Sampdoria	0–2	Pisa	Genoa
20:30 CEST (UTC+2)

29 August 2023 3	Pisa	1–2	Parma	Pisa
20:30 CEST (UTC+2)				Stadium: Arena Garibaldi

2 September 2023 4	Modena	2–0	Pisa	Modena
18:30 CEST (UTC+2)

16 September 2023 5	Pisa	1–1	Bari	Pisa
14:00 CEST (UTC+2)				Stadium: Arena Garibaldi

23 September 2023 6	Feralpisalò	0–1	Pisa	Piacenza
14:00 CEST (UTC+2)				Stadium: Stadio Leonardo Garilli

26 September 2023 7	Reggiana	0–0	Pisa	Reggio Emilia
CEST (UTC+2)				Stadium: Mapei Stadium – Città del Tricolore

30 September 2023 8	Pisa	1–2	Cosenza	Pisa
CEST (UTC+2)				Stadium: Arena Garibaldi

8 October 2023 9	Spezia	0–0	Pisa	La Spezia
CEST (UTC+2)

21 October 2023 10	Pisa	2–1	Cittadella	Pisa
CEST (UTC+2)				Stadium: Arena Garibaldi

24 October 2023 1	Pisa	1–2	Lecco	Pisa
CEST (UTC+2)				Stadium: Arena Garibaldi

29 October 2023 11	Venezia	2–1	Pisa	Venice
16:15 CET (UTC+1)				Stadium: Stadio Pier Luigi Penzo

4 November 2023 12	Pisa	1–1	Como	Pisa
14:00 CET (UTC+1)	Valoti 46'		Cutrone 12'	Stadium: Arena Garibaldi

11 November 2023 13	Südtirol	1–2	Pisa	Bolzano
14:00 CET (UTC+1)

26 April 2024 35	Pisa	2–2	Catanzaro	Pisa
20:30		Report		Stadium: Arena Garibaldi; Referee: Matteo Gualtieri

10 May 2024 38	Ascoli	v	Pisa	Ascoli Piceno
20:30 CEST (UTC+2)				Stadium: Stadio Cino e Lillo Del Duca

=== Coppa Italia ===
11 August 2023 Round of 64	Frosinone	1–0	Pisa	Frosinone
17:45 CEST (UTC+2)	Canestrelli 7' (o.g.); Romagnoli (yellow card) 55'; Monterisi (yellow card) 90'	Report	Hermannsson (yellow card) 78'; Tramoni (yellow card) 90'	Stadium: Stadio Benito Stirpe; Attendance: 3,804; Referee: Davide Ghersini
