= Alexander Knaster =

Russian-born American businessman (born 1959)

- Born: 19 February 1959 (age 67); Moscow, Russian SSR, USSR
- Education: BS Carnegie Mellon University; MBA Harvard Business School
- Occupation: Investment manager
- Known for: Founder of Pamplona Capital Management
- Spouse: Irina Knaster
- Children: Four

Alexander Knaster (born 19 February 1959) is an American businessman who is the founder of Pamplona Capital Management. He is documented to giving large donations to the Conservative Party in The United Kingdom.

== Biography ==
Knaster was born in Moscow in 1959 to a Jewish family of academics. His father, Mark Knaster, who held several patents relating to metal coatings, batteries and solar cells, worked in a number of respected scientific institutions, including USC. His mother, Tatyana Knaster, is a civil engineer who taught at Pennsylvania Institute of Technology.

Knaster was a graduate of Physics and Mathematics School No. 444 before moving outside the territory of the USSR. Knaster immigrated to the United States at the age of 16 with his family. He graduated with a B.S. electric engineering and mathematics from Carnegie Mellon University which he attended on a scholarship. In 1980, he accepted a job as an engineer with Schlumberger working on their oil platforms in the Gulf of Mexico.

After graduating in 1985 with an MBA from Harvard Business School and working at several investment banks, he returned to Russia in 1995 to work as CEO of the Russian branch of Credit Suisse First Boston. He also earned a PhD in Economics from the Russian Academy of Science. In 1998, he resigned from CSFB and accepted an offer from Mikhail Fridman to become CEO at Alfa Bank. He was very successful and due to his background in investment banking, Knaster established Pamplona Capital Management in 2004, in which the Alfa Group would invest some of its profit. He chose the name Pamplona after the Pamplona San Fermín Festival which he attended after graduating from Harvard Business School. His investor pool has since grown beyond Alfa. As of 2021, Pamplona managed $15 billion in assets. Knaster also serves as Executive Fellow, London Business School, member of faculty at Department of Strategy and Entrepreneurship.

In January 2021, he acquired a 75% stake of the Italian football club Pisa. In the 2024–2025 season, Pisa finished second in Serie B and was promoted to Serie A.

== Philanthropy ==
Knaster is an active philanthropist, who has made significant contributions to different academic institutions, including Carnegie Mellon University and Harvard Business School, where he serves as a regional Campaign Leadership volunteer. In 1993, Knaster established the Alexander M. Knaster Scholarship Fund for undergraduates in the Department of Electrical and Computer Engineering at Carnegie Mellon University. In 2011, in partnership with fellow alumnus Bruce McWilliams, Knaster helped to establish the Knaster-McWilliams scholarships, which allow for increased access to faculty and early research opportunities in addition to tuition assistance. The Alexander M. Knaster Professorship in Mathematical sciences is named in his honor. He is also a member of the Board of Trustees of NYU.

Knaster along with Stan Polovets as well as three Russian Jewish oligarchs, Mikhail Fridman, Pyotr Aven, and German Khan, founded the Genesis Philanthropy Group whose purpose is to develop and enhance Jewish identity among Russian-speaking Jews worldwide. Knaster later served as chairman of the board for the Genesis Philanthropy Group.

Knaster has also generously supported the Dana Farber Cancer Institute and the Dr. Maria I. New Children’s Hormone Foundation, which supports research, physician education, and the cost of care for children suffering from genetic hormonal disorders.

Alex Knaster is Recognized Among The 100 Most Influential People in Oncology in 2025. In 2014 Knaster established The Mark Foundation for Cancer Research . He has transferred the bulk of his assets to it and has rapidly positioned The Mark Foundation for Cancer Research as one of the most consequential private funders of innovative cancer science worldwide.

== Personal life ==
Knaster is married to Irina Knaster; they have four children. He lives in New York City, New York.
