= Alexander Lind (footballer, born 2002) =

Danish footballer (born 2002)

Personal information
- Full name: Alexander Lucas Lind Rasmussen
- Date of birth: 26 June 2002 (age 24)
- Place of birth: Hørning, Denmark
- Height: 1.86 m (6 ft 1 in)
- Position: Forward

Team information
- Current team: Nordsjælland
- Number: 11

Youth career
- –2016: Hørning IF
- 2016–2019: Silkeborg

Senior career*
Years	Team	Apps	(Gls)
2019–2024	Silkeborg	78	(18)
2024–2026	Pisa	32	(8)
2025–2026	→ Nordsjælland (loan)	18	(6)
2026–	Nordsjælland	9	(3)

International career^{‡}
2018	Denmark U16	3	(0)
2018	Denmark U17	3	(1)
2020	Denmark U19	1	(0)
2023	Denmark U21	2	(0)
- * Club domestic league appearances and goals as of 18 October 2026 ‡ National team caps and goals as of 17 October 2023

Alexander Lucas Lind Rasmussen (born 26 June 2002) is a Danish professional footballer, who plays as a forward for Danish Superliga club FC Nordsjælland.

== Club career ==
=== Silkeborg IF ===
Lind joined Silkeborg IF in 2016 from Hørning IF. On 6 July 2017 - his 15th birthday - Lind signed a long trainee-contract with Silkeborg until the summer 2020, after an impressive first season with 33 goals for the U15s.

In the autumn of 2019, he joined the training with SIF's first team after extending his contract until the end of 2022. At this point, Lind had played two reserve league games and one friendly game for the first team. He got his official debut in the last game of 2019, when he on 15 December 2019 replaced Filip Lesniak in the last minutes of a Danish Superliga game against Lyngby Boldklub. Lind became the fourth-youngest debutant in the history of Silkeborg, aged 17 years 171 days old. He scores his first professional goal in on 15 June 2020 against Odense Boldklub.

In September 2023, Lind scored five goals in three league appearances, and his performances led to him being named Superliga Player of the Month.

=== Pisa ===
On August 12, 2024, Serie B side Pisa confirmed that Lind joined the club on a deal until June 2028.

Despite a very good season at Pisa, where he scored 8 goals in 32 league matches and thus helped the club secure promotion to the 2025–26 Serie A, Lind left the Italian club after the season. Because, on transfer deadline day, September 1, 2025, Lind transferred to the Danish Superliga club FC Nordsjælland on a loan deal until the end of the season. According to media reports, Nordsjælland paid 300,000 euros for the loan deal, and also secured a purchase option of around 4 million euros.

== Personal life ==
Alexander Lind is the older brother of Jonathan Lind, who is also a professional footballer.

== Career statistics ==
As of match played 18 October 2026

Club statistics
Club	Season	League			National Cup		Europe (Note: Includes the UEFA Conference League)		Total	
Club	Season	Division	Apps	Goals	Apps	Goals	Apps	Goals	Apps	Goals
Silkeborg	2019–20	Danish Superliga	9	2	1	0	—		10	2
Silkeborg	2020–21	Danish 1st Division	21	3	0	0	—		21	3
Silkeborg	2021–22	Danish Superliga	6	1	0	0	—		6	1
Silkeborg	2022–23	Danish Superliga	11	2	2	0	2	0	15	2
Silkeborg	2023–24	Danish Superliga	28	10	5	0	—		33	10
Silkeborg	2024–25	Danish Superliga	3	0	0	0	2	1	5	1
Silkeborg	Total		78	18	9	0	4	1	91	19
Pisa	2024–25	Serie B	32	8	1	0	—		33	8
Nordsjælland (loan)	2025–26	Danish Superliga	18	6	4	0	—		22	6
Nordsjælland	2026–27	Danish Superliga	9	3	0	0	3 (Note: Appearances in UEFA Conference League)	0	12	3
Career totals			137	35	13	0	7	1	157	36

== Honours ==
Silkeborg

- Danish Cup: 2023–24

Individual

- Superliga Player of the Month: September 2023
- Superliga Team of the Month: September 2023
