= Bossa (disambiguation) =

Bossa may refer to:

- Bossa nova, a genre of music originating from Brazil, similar to a mix of samba and jazz

== People ==
- Francesco Bossa (born 1990) Italian soccer player
- José Ferreira Bossa (1894-1970) Portuguese colonial governor
- Solomy Balungi Bossa (born 1956) Ugandan judge

== Companies ==
- Bossa Studios, UK videogame developer
- Bossa (company), Turkish textile company

== See also ==
- Bossa nova (disambiguation)
- Blue Bossa (disambiguation)
