= Father of Bossa Nova =

Father of Bossa Nova is an epithet held by several pioneers of bossa nova. It may refer to:

- João Gilberto (1931–2019), Brazilian musician
- Johnny Alf (1929–2010), Brazilian musician
- Tom Jobim (1927–1994), Brazilian musician

== See also ==
- List of bossa nova standards
- Bossa nova (disambiguation)
