= Jonathan Lind =

Danish footballer (born 2003)

Personal information
- Full name: Jonathan Filho Lind Rasmussen
- Date of birth: 23 November 2003 (age 22)
- Place of birth: Skanderborg, Denmark
- Height: 1.86 m (6 ft 1 in)
- Position: Forward

Team information
- Current team: Hobro
- Number: 21

Youth career
- –2020: Silkeborg
- 2020–2021: FC Skanderborg
- 2022–2023: Midtjylland

Senior career*
| Years | Team | Apps | (Gls) |
| 2021–2022 | Kjellerup | | |
| 2023–2025 | Mafra | 10 | (0) |
| 2025– | Hobro | 2 | (0) |
- * Club domestic league appearances and goals as of 2 June 2026

Jonathan Filho Lind Rasmussen (born 23 November 2003) is a Danish footballer who plays as a forward for Danish 1st Division side Hobro IK.

== Club career ==
=== Early years & FC Midtjylland ===
Jonathan Lind started out in Silkeborg IF's youth department, but moved to FC Skanderborg in the summer of 2020. A year later, he joined Denmark Series club Kjellerup IF, where he played senior football for the club in the Denmark Series at an early age. In November 2022, 17-year-old Lind was also on trial at Danish Superliga club AaB, having impressed a month earlier in a cup match against FC Midtjylland. He ended up staying at Kjellerup, and after a year and a half, he left the club after the 2021–22 season, where he played 25 games and scored four goals in the Denmark Series.

Lind ended up moving to FC Midtjylland in the summer of 2022, where he became part of the club's U-19 team. After a good first season with 13 goals and 4 assists in 25 U-19 league games, Lind was rewarded with a long contract extension until June 2028.

=== CD Mafra ===
On July 26, 2023, Lind, along with two other teammates, moved to Liga Portugal 2 club C.D. Mafra. Nibe made his debut for the club in a league match on September 2, 2023, against FC Porto B.

=== Hobro IK ===
In August 2025, Lind returned to Denmark, signing a deal until June 2028 with Danish 1st Division club Hobro IK.

== Personal life ==
Jonathan Lind is the younger brother of Alexander Lind, who is also a professional footballer.
