= Bossa nova (disambiguation) =

Bossa nova is a style of music.

Bossa Nova or Bossanova may also refer to:

- Bossa Nova (dance), a dance form associated with the music

== Film and TV ==
- Bossa Nova (film), a 2000 film
- Bossa Nova (1964 film), a 1964 film by Carlos Hugo Christensen

== Music ==
- Bossanova (band), a Canadian band

=== Albums ===
- Bossa Nova (Bola Sete album), 1962
- Bossa Nova (Eddie Harris album), 1963
- Bossa Nova (John Pizzarelli album), 2004
- Bossa Nova (Ramsey Lewis album), 1962
- Bossanova (Pixies album), 1990
- Bossa Nova (Shorty Rogers album), 1962
- Bossa Nova: New Brazilian Jazz, by Lalo Schifrin, 1962
- Bossa Nova 2001, by Pizzicato Five, 1993
- Bossanova Swap Meet, by Atomic Swing, 1994
- Bossanova Jazz by Lionel Hampton, 1963
- Bossa Nova U.S.A., by Dave Brubeck Quartet, 1963

=== Songs ===
- "Soul Bossa Nova", by Quincy Jones
- "Bossanova", by Laibach from Spectre
- "Nova Bossa Nova", by Glaxo Babies
- "Bossa Nova", by Tee Grizzley

== Companies ==
- Bossa Nova Robotics, an American robotics startup

== See also ==
- List of bossa nova standards
- Novas Bossas (album) 2008 Brazilian album by Milton Nascimento
- Bossa Nova, Nova Bossa (album) 1963 Brazilian LP by Manfredo Fest
- Nova Bossa Nova (band) Brazilian jazz ensemble
- Father of Bossa Nova
