= Žan Jevšenak =

Slovenian footballer (born 2003)

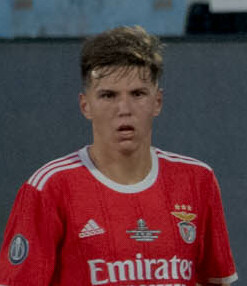
- Jevšenak in 2022

Personal information
- Date of birth: 15 May 2003 (age 23)
- Place of birth: Maribor, Slovenia
- Height: 1.91 m (6 ft 3 in)
- Position: Defensive midfielder

Team information
- Current team: Maribor
- Number: 5

Youth career
- Pragersko
- –2018: Aluminij
- 2018–2019: Bravo
- 2019–2022: Benfica

Senior career*
Years	Team	Apps	(Gls)
2022–2024	Benfica B	52	(2)
2024–2026	Pisa	2	(0)
2025	→ Oliveirense (loan)	12	(1)
2025–2026	→ Vanspor (loan)	28	(0)
2026–	Maribor	15	(1)

International career
2017–2018	Slovenia U15	6	(0)
2018–2019	Slovenia U16	8	(1)
2019	Slovenia U17	8	(1)
2021	Slovenia U18	2	(0)
2021	Slovenia U19	6	(1)
2022–2025	Slovenia U21	20	(0)
- * Club domestic league appearances and goals as of 22 November 2026

Žan Jevšenak (born 15 May 2003) is a Slovenian professional footballer who plays as a defensive midfielder for Slovenian PrvaLiga club Maribor.

== Club career ==
Born in Maribor, Jevšenak grew up in Spodnja Polskava and started his football career at local club NK Pragersko. He later played youth football with Aluminij and Bravo, before joining Portuguese giants Benfica in 2019. In September 2021, Jevšenak signed a new contract with the Lisbon-based club. He made his professional debut with Benfica's reserve team in a 2–1 loss to Mafra in April 2022.

On 15 July 2024, Jevšenak signed for Serie B club Pisa. Six months later, he went on loan to Portuguese club Oliveirense for the remainder of the 2024–25 season.

== International career ==
Jevšenak represented Slovenia at all youth international levels from under-15 to under-21.

== Career statistics ==
=== Club ===
As of 13 August 2022

Appearances and goals by club, season and competition
Club	Season	League			National cup		Continental		Total	
Club	Season	Division	Apps	Goals	Apps	Goals	Apps	Goals	Apps	Goals
Benfica B	2021–22	Liga Portugal 2	1	0	—		—		1	0
Benfica B	2022–23	Liga Portugal 2	1	0	—		—		1	0
Benfica B	Total		2	0	0	0	0	0	2	0
Career total			2	0	0	0	0	0	2	0

== Honours ==
Benfica

- Campeonato Nacional de Juniores: 2021–22
- UEFA Youth League: 2021–22
- Under-20 Intercontinental Cup: 2022
