= Mattéo Tramoni =

French footballer (born 2000)

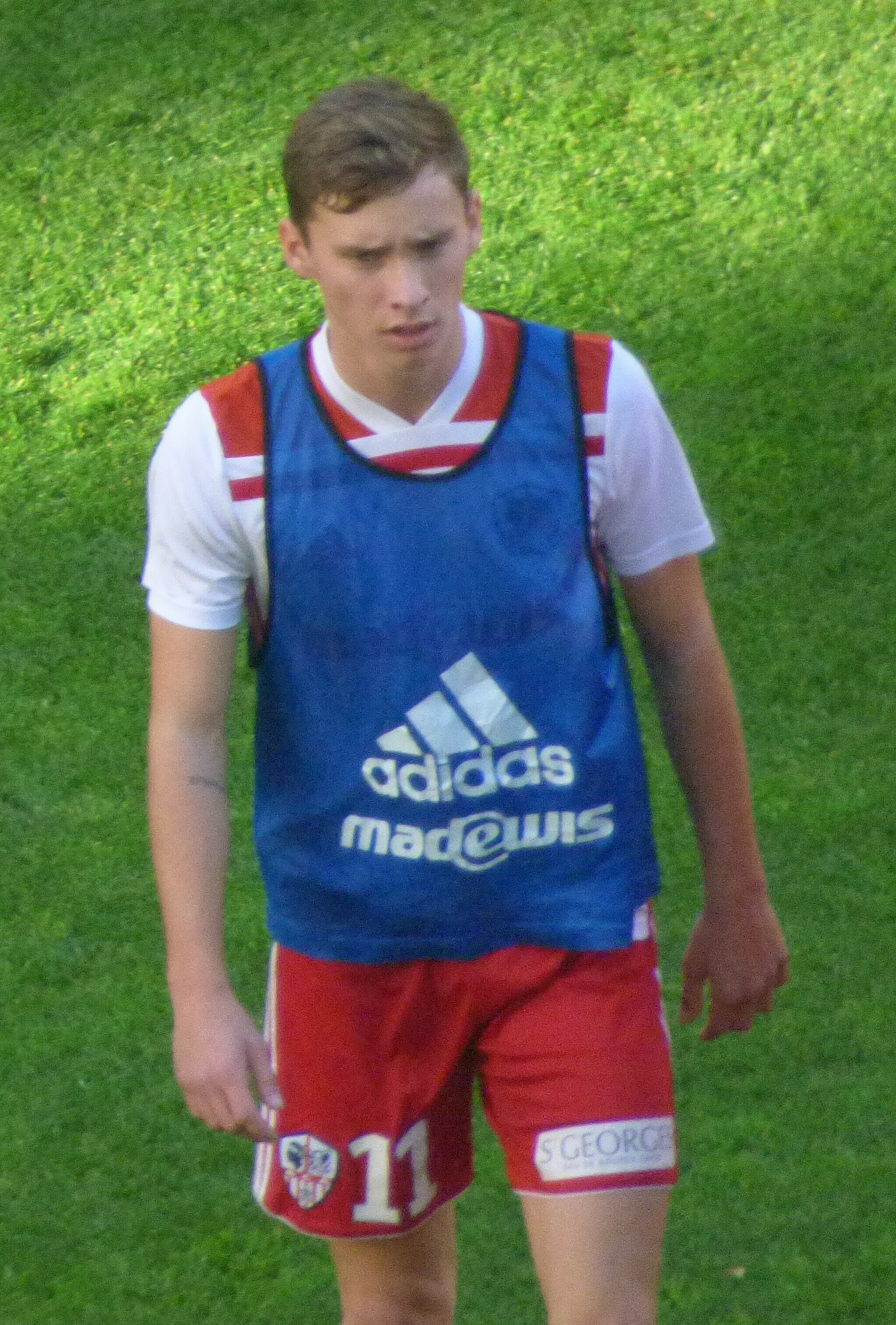
- Tramoni in 2018

Personal information
- Date of birth: 20 January 2000 (age 26)
- Place of birth: Ajaccio, France
- Height: 1.75 m (5 ft 9 in)
- Positions: Attacking midfielder; winger; forward

Team information
- Current team: Pisa
- Number: 10

Youth career
- 2007–2017: Ajaccio

Senior career*
Years	Team	Apps	(Gls)
2017–2018	Ajaccio II	3	(3)
2017–2020	Ajaccio	62	(5)
2020–2022	Cagliari	6	(0)
2021–2022	→ Brescia (loan)	38	(7)
2022–	Pisa	92	(23)

International career^{‡}
2018	France U18	4	(0)
2018–	Corsica	2	(0)
2019	France U19	1	(0)
- * Club domestic league appearances and goals as of 25 May 2026 ‡ National team caps and goals as of 13 February 2019

Mattéo Tramoni (born 20 January 2000) is a professional footballer who plays as an attacking midfielder, winger, or forward for Serie B club Pisa.

== Club career ==
Tramoni made his professional debut for AC Ajaccio in a 3–0 Ligue 2 win against Valenciennes FC on 19 September 2017, at the age of 17. He scored his first professional goal in a 2–0 win over Football Bourg-en-Bresse Péronnas 01 on 29 September 2017.

On 1 July 2021, he joined Brescia on loan.

On 18 August 2022, Tramoni moved to Pisa, signing a four-year contract with the Tuscan club.

== Personal life ==
Tramoni is the older brother of the footballer Lisandru Tramoni.

In March 2024, Tramoni formally became an Italian citizen, thus becoming eligible to play internationally for Italy as well.

== Career statistics ==
=== Club ===
As of match played 10 January 2026

Appearances and goals by club, season and competition
Club	Season	League			Cup		Europe		Other		Total	
Club	Season	Division	Apps	Goals	Apps	Goals	Apps	Goals	Apps	Goals	Apps	Goals
Ajaccio	2017–18	Ligue 2	9	1	1	0	—		1	0	11	1
Ajaccio	2018–19	Ligue 2	28	2	2	0	—		—		30	2
Ajaccio	2019–20	Ligue 2	24	2	1	1	—		—		25	3
Ajaccio	2020–21	Ligue 2	1	0	0	0	—		—		1	0
Ajaccio	Total		62	5	4	1	0	0	1	0	67	6
Ajaccio B	2018–19	Championnat National	2	3	—		—		—		2	3
Ajaccio B	2018–19	Championnat National	1	0	—		—		—		1	0
Ajaccio B	Total		3	3	0	0	0	0	0	0	3	3
Cagliari	2020–21	Serie A	6	0	3	0	—		—		9	0
Brescia	2021–22	Serie B	38	7	1	0	—		3	1	42	8
Pisa	2022–23	Serie B	32	5	0	0	—		—		32	5
Pisa	2023–24	Serie B	7	3	1	0	—		—		8	3
Pisa	2024–25	Serie B	26	13	1	1	—		—		27	14
Pisa	2025–26	Serie A	18	2	2	0	—		—		20	2
Pisa	Total		83	23	4	1	0	0	0	0	87	24
Career total			192	38	12	2	0	0	4	1	208	41
