= Blue Bossa (disambiguation) =

"Blue Bossa" is a jazz standard by Kenny Dorham.

Blue Bossa may also refer to:

- Blue Bossa (New York Unit album), 1990
- Blue Bossa (McCoy Tyner album), 1991

== See also ==
- Bossa (disambiguation)
