= Henrik Meister =

Danish footballer (born 2003)

Personal information
- Full name: Henrik Wendel Meister
- Date of birth: 17 November 2003 (age 22)
- Place of birth: Copenhagen, Denmark
- Height: 1.93 m (6 ft 4 in)
- Position: Forward

Team information
- Current team: Derby County (on loan from Pisa)
- Number: 19

Youth career
- –2019: BK Skjold
- 2019–2021: B 1903

Senior career*
Years	Team	Apps	(Gls)
2021–2022	FA 2000	14	(1)
2022–2023	Fremad Amager	31	(7)
2023–2024	Sarpsborg 08	21	(9)
2023	Sarpsborg 08 2	3	(1)
2024–2025	Rennes	4	(1)
2025	→ Pisa (loan)	15	(2)
2025–	Pisa	28	(2)
2026–	→ Derby County (loan)	9	(0)

International career^{‡}
2024	Denmark U20	2	(1)
- * Club domestic league appearances and goals as of 22:22, 6 November 2026 (UTC) ‡ National team caps and goals as of 10 September 2024

Henrik Wendel Meister (born 17 November 2003) is a Danish professional footballer who plays as a striker for EFL Championship club Derby County, on loan from Serie B club Pisa.

== Early and personal life ==
Meister was born on 17 November 2003 in Copenhagen, Denmark, and grew up in the Østerbro district. His mother is from Cameroon, and he has stated that he understands French. Meister's father died from lung cancer when he was 13, leading him to step away from football for two years before resuming with encouragement from his uncle. At 16, Meister left school to focus on football, working part-time at a supermarket to support his training.

== Club career ==
=== Early career ===
Meister began his career with BK Skjold, but after being rejected by several larger Danish clubs during trials, including Nordsjælland, he decided to focus less on football at the age of 17. He then joined B 1903 and helped the team secure promotion from the Copenhagen Series to the Denmark Series in 2021. While playing in a seventh-tier Series 2 match with B 1903's reserves against FA 2000's third team, Meister caught the attention of Steffen Dam, FA 2000's sports director, leading to his transfer to the club in August 2021.

He soon made his Danish 2nd Division debut for FA 2000, scoring two goals in 16 appearances during his six-month stint at the club. Reflecting on Meister's time at FA 2000, sports director Steffen Dam remarked, "We gave him his debut in the 2nd Division quickly in the fall of 2021, but we didn't have the funds to offer him a contract. He soon brought in an agent, Michael Mio, and eventually turned down our offer. Unfortunately, we needed more time to evaluate him before making an offer. He ended up accepting Fremad Amager's offer instead. I might be a bit frustrated about that today, but it is what it is. And, as they say, the rest is history."

=== Fremad Amager ===
On 2 February 2022, Meister signed a six-months contract with Danish 1st Division club Fremad Amager. He made his competitive debut for the club on 19 February, replacing Michael Lumb in the 77th minute of a 1–1 away draw against Jammerbugt. On 18 May, Meister came on at half-time and completed Fremad Amager's comeback away against Esbjerg fB by scoring his first two goals for the club in a 3–2 victory.

On 27 May 2022, Meister signed his first professional contract with Fremad Amager, a one-year deal keeping him at the club until 2023.

Meister scored seven goals and provided one assist in 33 appearances for Ama'rkanerne. He left the club after they were relegated to the third-tier Danish 2nd Division at the end of the 2022–23 season.

=== Sarpsborg ===
On 14 July 2023, Meister signed a three-and-a-half-year contract with Eliteserien club Sarpsborg 08. He made his debut for the club on 6 August, replacing Serge-Junior Martinsson Ngouali in the 77th minute of a 5–1 away defeat to Sandefjord. In his next appearance for Sarpsborg on 19 August, Meister scored his first goal for the club, helping secure a 3–0 away victory against Odd. On 27 August, during a reserve-team match against Lørenskog, Meister broke his collarbone, which sidelined him for the remainder of the season. Reflecting on the following months, Meister stated, "I managed to play three matches before I broke my collarbone and was out for the rest of the season. During those 3–4 months, I felt completely alone; I couldn't do anything at all."

Meister only returned to action on the first matchday of the 2024 season, coming off the bench at half-time in a 1–0 loss to Viking. On 12 July 2024, Meister scored four goals in a league match against Rosenborg, with his first three goals coming within a 20-minute span in the first half. This performance was part of a good run of form in which Meister scored seven goals in three games. His impressive displays attracted attention from larger clubs, with reports of interest from Molde and Ligue 1 club Rennes.

=== Rennes ===
On 15 August 2024, Meister joined Ligue 1 club Rennes on a four-year contract, after Sarpsborg had accepted an initial transfer fee reported to be €8 million, potentially rising to €13 million in add-ons.

Meister made his club debut on 18 August, coming on as an 87th-minute substitute for compatriot and fellow new signing Albert Grønbæk in the season opener against Lyon. Shortly after entering the game, he scored Rennes' third and final goal in a 3–0 away victory.

=== Pisa ===
On 13 January 2025, Meister joined Serie B club Pisa on loan, with an option to buy. On 10 August 2025, the transfer was made permanent and Meister signed a three-season contract with Pisa, with an option for a fourth year.

=== Derby County ===
On 30 August 2026, Meister joined EFL Championship club Derby County on a season-long loan with an option to make the move permanent in the summer of 2027. Meister made his Derby County debut on 5 September 2026, in a 3–0 defeat at West Ham United.

== International career ==
On 28 August 2024, Meister received his first call-up to the Denmark U-20 squad, for two friendlies against Sweden. He made his debut during a 1–0 win in the first game on 7 September. Three days later, Meister scored his first goal for Denmark just three minutes into the match, contributing to Denmark's 4–1 victory over Sweden.

== Style of play ==
Standing at 1.93 m (6 ft 4 in), Meister began playing senior football at a young age, which helped him develop physical strength. Despite having the attributes to excel as a striker, his goal-scoring ability was inconsistent until his final year at Sarpsborg 08 in 2024. Upon signing with Rennes, executive president and CEO Olivier Cloarec described Meister as "someone who can bring height, goal-scoring ability, and the capacity to involve others in play."

== Career statistics ==
As of match played 3 November 2026

Appearances and goals by club, season and competition
Club	Season	League			National cup (Note: Includes Danish Cup, Norwegian Football Cup, Copa Italia, FA Cup)		Europe		Other		Total	
Club	Season	Division	Apps	Goals	Apps	Goals	Apps	Goals	Apps	Goals	Apps	Goals
FA 2000	2021–22	Danish 2nd Division	14	1	2	1	—		—		16	2
Fremad Amager	2021–22	Danish 1st Division	15	2	—		—		—		15	2
Fremad Amager	2022–23	Danish 1st Division	16	5	2	0	—		—		18	5
Fremad Amager	Total		31	7	2	0	—		—		33	7
Sarpsborg 08	2023	Eliteserien	3	1	—		—		—		3	1
Sarpsborg 08	2024	Eliteserien	18	8	4	1	—		—		22	9
Sarpsborg 08	Total		21	9	4	1	—		—		25	10
Sarpsborg 08 2	2023	3. divisjon	3	1	—		—		—		3	1
Rennes	2024–25	Ligue 1	4	1	0	0	0	0	—		4	1
Pisa (loan)	2024–25	Serie B	15	2	0	0	—		—		15	2
Pisa	2025–26	Serie A	28	2	1	0	—		—		29	2
Pisa	2026–27	Serie B	0	0	1	0	—		—		1	0
Pisa	Total		28	2	2	0	—		—		30	2
Derby County (loan)	2026–27	EFL Championship	9	0	0	0	—		—		9	0
Career total			125	23	10	2	0	0	0	0	135	25

== Honours ==
Individual

- Eliteserien Player of the Month: July 2024
- Eliteserien Young Player of the Month: July 2024
