= Bruce McWilliams =

American business executive (1956–2023)

Bruce Marshall McWilliams (June 19, 1956 – September 26, 2023) was an American business executive and serial entrepreneur specializing in technology. He co-founded and managed multiple companies in the field of electronics, semiconductor, packaging and display. At the time of his death, McWilliams was chief executive officer of Bossa Nova Robotics, the leading developer of service robots for the global retail industry and Chairman of TetraVue.

== Early life and education ==
Bruce McWilliams was born on June 19, 1956, in Cincinnati, Ohio, and grew up in St. Louis, Missouri.

McWilliams became interested in physics at an early age. Playing with electronic kits and taking electronic equipment apart, he built circuits and discovered the transistor. He wanted to understand how it was working. Later in high-school he studied The Feynman Lectures on Physics and knew that Physics was his passion. As a teenager, McWilliams was inspired to submit the solution to a complex math problem to a professor at the Carnegie Institute of Technology. He was quickly admitted with a full scholarship to Carnegie Mellon, where he finished his undergraduate and doctoral studies in physics in just seven years. McWilliams obtained a B.S. (1978), M.S. (1978) and Ph.D. (1981) degrees in physics from Carnegie Mellon University.

== Career ==
=== Mellon Institute ===
McWilliams started his career as a Senior Fellow at the Mellon Institute where he worked on Solid State Sensors and Infrared Systems.

=== Lawrence Livermore National Laboratory (LLNL) ===
McWilliams led early research and development efforts at LLNL for space-based missile defense intercept technology (“Brilliant Pebbles” program). He led the development of critical technologies for integrated circuit manufacturing, electronic system integration, wide-field target tracking systems, and radiation hardening technologies for electronics. While working at LLNL on the “Brilliant Pebbles” space-based missile defense program, McWilliams led a team focused on the laser processing of semiconductors, optical systems for target tracking and electronics packaging, including packaging to miniaturize electronic systems – a key enabler of the electronics revolution.

=== nChip ===
McWilliams left Lawrence Livermore National Laboratory (LLNL) to co-found nCHIP, a company developing semiconductor packaging solutions based on a technology licensed from LLNL. nCHIP received funding from major investors including Kleiner Perkins, Mohr Davidow, and Mayfield. The technology was used by Sun Microsystems for the Spark Station II. nCHIP was acquired by Flextronics International in 1995.

=== Flextronics International ===
As Senior Vice President McWilliams led product engineering and prototype production at sites in San Jose, Boston and Singapore. He was the lead technical officer for the acquisitions strategy.

=== S-Vision ===
Following his yearning for entrepreneurship, McWilliams left Flextronics and S-Vision, a silicon integrated circuit-based display company in 1996. The company developed a liquid crystal-on-silicon based reflective display technology for video projectors and high resolution monitors. In 1999, the operations were sold to companies in the display and related manufacturing segments.

=== Tessera ===
McWilliams was president and CEO of Tessera Technologies from 1999 to 2008 and chairman and CSO until 2009. McWilliams was recruited by Tessera to turn around the chip packaging business into a profitable and growing company. McWilliams changed the strategic direction away from manufacturing and built a successful licensing business model focused on the mobile phone and semiconductor memory market. Tessera has licensed its chip packaging technology to numerous semiconductor manufacturers, including Intel and Samsung Electronics. McWilliams took Tessera public in 2003. During McWilliams’ tenure, Tessera experienced remarkable compounded revenue and operating profit growth which led to Tessera being cited by Business Week as the Second Hottest Growing Company in America in 2006 and the 20th Hottest Growing Company in 2007. In 2006, Electronic Business cited Tessera as the 4th Best Small Electronics Company in the US.

=== USVP ===
McWilliams joined U.S. Venture Partners, a leading Silicon Valley–based venture capital firm as executive-in-residence.

=== SuVolta ===
McWilliams was president and CEO of Suvolta from 2009 to 2014. SuVolta was a start-up backed by Silicon Valley venture capital firms including KPCB, August Capital, DAG Ventures and NEA. Formerly DSMSolutions, the company had the vision to develop a new transistor technology to enable low power devices. As CEO, McWilliams changed the strategy from a solution based on JFet technology to a more commonly used CMOS solution. The technology was licensed to Fujitsu Semiconductor for their 55 nm process and used in MB86S22AA Milbeaut image processor IC.

=== Intermolecular ===
McWilliams was president and chief executive officer of Intermolecular, Inc. Under McWilliams's leadership, Intermolecular changed its business model and introduced IMI Labs.

=== Bossa Nova Robotics ===
McWilliams was chief executive officer of a company developing autonomous service robots for the global retail industry. Bossa Robotics platform automates the collection and analysis of on-shelf inventory data.

== Personal life and death ==
Bruce was married three times with all his marriages ending in divorce. He was a racing car fanatic with most of his time spent on that hobby or on his businesses. He enjoyed keeping up with the latest developments in cosmology.

Bruce McWilliams died on September 26, 2023, at the age of 67 of a cerebral stroke.

== Recognition and awards ==
Received the 2005 Ernst & Young's Northern California Entrepreneur of the Year award.

McWilliams was nominated to the Lawrence Livermore Hall Entrepreneurs' Hall of Fame for his contribution to developing semiconductor packaging technology and founding and leading multiple technologies companies (Note:nCHIP and S-Vision, and for leadership at Tessera Technologies and Suvolta).
