= Alessandro Coppola =

Italian footballer (born 2000)

Personal information
- Date of birth: 13 March 2000 (age 26)
- Place of birth: Turin, Italy
- Height: 2.02 m (6 ft 8 in)
- Position: Defender

Team information
- Current team: Birżebbuġa St. Peter's
- Number: 26

Youth career
- –2018: Torino

Senior career*
Years	Team	Apps	(Gls)
2018–2019	Torino	0	(0)
2018	→ Ercolanese (loan)	7	(1)
2018–2019	→ Sondrio (loan)	25	(1)
2019–2020	Livorno	6	(1)
2020–2021	Olhanense	15	(1)
2021–2024	Triestina	0	(0)
2022	→ Tsarsko Selo Sofia (loan)	8	(0)
2022–2024	→ Birkirkara (loan)	32	(4)
2024–2025	Birkirkara	30	(2)
2025–2026	Arzignano	11	(0)
2026	Birkirkara	15	(0)
2026–	Birżebbuġa St. Peter's	7	(0)
- * Club domestic league appearances and goals as of 18 October 2026

Alessandro Coppola (born 13 March 2000) is an Italian professional footballer who plays as a defender for Birżebbuġa St. Peter's. With a 2.05 m height, he is the second tallest football player in the world, after Kristof Van Hout.

== Club career ==
On 12 July 2021, he signed with Triestina. On 29 January 2022, he moved on loan to Tsarsko Selo Sofia in Bulgaria until the end of the 2021–22 season.

On 7 August 2026, he signed for Birżebbuġa St. Peter's.

== Personal life ==
Coppola is of Cuban descent through his mother. He is the brother of the professional footballers Domenico and Francesco Coppola.

== Honours ==
Birkirkara F.C.

- Maltese FA Trophy: 2022-23

== Club statistics ==
=== Club ===
As of 28 July 2020.

Club	Season	League			National Cup		League Cup		Other		Total	
Club	Season	Division	Apps	Goals	Apps	Goals	Apps	Goals	Apps	Goals	Apps	Goals
Torino	2017–18	Serie A	0	0	0	0	–		0	0	0	0
Torino	2018–19	Serie A	0	0	0	0	–		0	0	0	0
Torino	Total		0	0	0	0	0	0	0	0	0	0
Ercolanese (loan)	2017–18	Serie D	7	1	0	0	0	0	0	0	7	1
Sondrio (loan)	2018–19	Serie D	25	1	0	0	1 (Note: Appearances in the Coppa Italia Serie D)	0	0	0	26	1
Livorno	2019–20	Serie B	5	1	0	0	–		0	0	5	1
Career total			1	0	0	0	0	0	0	0	1	0
