= Moutir Chajia =

Belgian footballer (born 1998)

Personal information
- Date of birth: 6 April 1998 (age 28)
- Place of birth: Heusden-Zolder, Belgium
- Height: 1.81 m (5 ft 11 in)
- Positions: Attacking midfielder; forward

Team information
- Current team: FK Sūduva
- Number: 11

Youth career
- –2014: JMG Academy
- 2014–2016: Oostende
- 2016–2017: Novara

Senior career*
Years	Team	Apps	(Gls)
2017–2018	Novara	26	(2)
2018–2019	Estoril	0	(0)
2019–2020	Ascoli	19	(1)
2020	→ Virtus Entella (loan)	6	(0)
2020–2021	Lokomotiva	27	(2)
2021–2025	Como	54	(1)
2025	Dinamo Batumi	2	(0)
2025	Petrolul Ploiești	0	(0)
2026–	FK Sūduva	10	(2)
- * Club domestic league appearances and goals as of 24 August 2026

Moutir Chajia (Arabic: متير شجيع; born 6 June 1998) is a Belgian professional footballer who plays as an attacking midfielder or a forward.

== Club career ==
Chajia arrived to Novara from Oostende in 2015. Chajia made his professional debut for Novara in a Serie B 2–0 loss to SPAL on 4 April 2017.

After the first part of the season in Portuguese club Estoril, on 22 January 2019 Chajia signed a 2.5-year contract with Italian Serie B side Ascoli. On 29 January 2020, he joined Virtus Entella on loan with an option to purchase.

On 13 July 2021, he signed a two-year contract with Italian club Como.

On 13 February 2026 Lithuanian Sūduva Club officially announced about the contract with Moutir Chajia.

== Personal life ==
Born in Belgium, Chajia is of Moroccan descent.

== Career statistics ==
As of match played 1 April 2025

Appearances and goals by club, season and competition
Club	Season	League			National cup (Note: Includes Coppa Italia, Croatian Cup)		Europe		Other		Total	
Club	Season	Division	Apps	Goals	Apps	Goals	Apps	Goals	Apps	Goals	Apps	Goals
Novara	2016–17	Serie B	7	0	0	0	—		—		7	0
Novara	2017–18	Serie B	19	2	1	0	—		—		20	2
Novara	Total		26	2	1	0	—		—		27	2
Estoril	2018–19	LigaPro	0	0	0	0	—		0	0	0	0
Ascoli	2018–19	Serie B	7	0	—		—		—		7	0
Ascoli	2019–20	Serie B	12	1	2	0	—		—		14	1
Ascoli	Total		19	1	2	0	—		—		21	1
Virtus Entella (loan)	2019–20	Serie B	6	0	—		—		—		6	0
Lokomotiva	2020–21	1. HNL	27	2	1	0	—		—		28	2
Como	2021–22	Serie B	14	0	1	2	—		—		15	2
Como	2022–23	Serie B	12	1	0	0	—		—		12	1
Como	2023–24	Serie B	28	0	1	0	—		—		29	0
Como	Total		54	1	2	2	—		—		56	3
Dinamo Batumi	2025	Erovnuli Liga	2	0	0	0	—		—		2	0
Petrolul Ploiești	2025–26	Liga I	0	0	0	0	—		—		0	0
Career total			134	6	6	2	0	0	0	0	140	8

== Honours ==
Como

- Serie B: 2023–24
