= Agostino Rizzo =

Italian footballer (born 1999)

Personal information
- Date of birth: 24 March 1999 (age 27)
- Place of birth: Palermo, Italy
- Height: 1.82 m (6 ft 0 in)
- Position: Midfielder

Youth career
- 2017–2019: Palermo

Senior career*
| Years | Team | Apps | (Gls) |
| 2019–2020 | AS Livorno | 1 | (0) |
| 2020 | → Avellino (loan) | 3 | (0) |
| 2020–2024 | Avellino | 75 | (0) |
| 2023–2024 | → Audace Cerignola (loan) | 19 | (2) |
| 2024–2025 | Cavese | 28 | (0) |
- * Club domestic league appearances and goals as of 7 December 2025

Agostino Rizzo (born 24 March 1999) is an Italian professional footballer who plays as a midfielder.

== Club career ==
On 1 September 2023, Rizzo was loaned to Audace Cerignola.

On 1 August 2024, he signed with Cavese.

== Career statistics ==
=== Club ===
As of match played 9 June 2021

Appearances and goals by club, season and competition
| Club | Season | League | | | National Cup | | Other | | Total | |
| Club | Season | Division | Apps | Goals | Apps | Goals | Apps | Goals | Apps | Goals |
|---|---|---|---|---|---|---|---|---|---|---|
| Livorno | 2019–20 | Serie B | 1 | 0 | 1 | 0 | — | | 2 | 0 |
| Avellino (loan) | 2019–20 | Serie C | 4 | 0 | — | | 1 | 0 | 5 (Note: Appearance(s) in Serie C Playoffs) | 0 |
| Avellino | 2020–21 | Serie C | 25 | 0 | — | | 4 | 0 | 29 | 0 |
| Career total | | | 30 | 0 | 1 | 0 | 5 | 0 | 36 | 0 |
