= Lisandru Tramoni =

French footballer (born 2003)

Personal information
- Date of birth: 18 April 2003 (age 23)
- Place of birth: Ajaccio, France
- Height: 1.80 m (5 ft 11 in)
- Position: Forward

Team information
- Current team: Rouen
- Number: 19

Youth career
- 2010–2019: Ajaccio
- 2020–2022: Cagliari

Senior career*
Years	Team	Apps	(Gls)
2019–2020	Ajaccio	1	(0)
2022–2025	Pisa	28	(2)
2024–2025	→ Bastia (loan)	25	(1)
2025–2026	Zürich	5	(0)
2025	Zürich II	2	(0)
2026–	Rouen	5	(1)

International career^{‡}
2018–2019	France U16	12	(3)
2019–2020	France U17	6	(2)
- * Club domestic league appearances and goals as of 3 September 2026 ‡ National team caps and goals as of 27 February 2020

Lisandru Tramoni (born 18 April 2003) is a French professional footballer who plays as a forward for Ligue 3 club Rouen.

== Club career ==
Tramoni made his professional debut for AC Ajaccio in a 2–1 Ligue 2 loss to Troyes on 21 December 2019, at the age of 16.

He successively signed with Cagliari, with whom he played only at youth level.

On 18 August 2022, Tramoni moved to Pisa, signing a four-year contract with the Tuscan club.

On 27 July 2025, Tramoni signed a three-season contract with Zürich in Switzerland. His contract was terminated on 3 February 2026.

== Personal life ==
Tramoni is the younger brother of the footballer Mattéo Tramoni.

In March 2024, Tramoni formally became an Italian citizen, thus becoming eligible to play internationally for Italy as well.
