= Mirko Carretta =

Italian footballer (born 1990)

Personal information
- Date of birth: 23 November 1990 (age 35)
- Place of birth: Gallipoli, Italy
- Height: 1.78 m (5 ft 10 in)
- Position: Right winger

Team information
- Current team: Brindisi
- Number: 7

Youth career
- Gallipoli

Senior career*
| Years | Team | Apps | (Gls) |
| 2008–2009 | Gallipoli | 4 | (0) |
| 2009–2010 | Matera | 29 | (9) |
| 2010–2011 | Andria | 25 | (3) |
| 2011–2013 | Benevento | 11 | (0) |
| 2012–2013 | → Barletta (loan) | 21 | (2) |
| 2013–2017 | Matera | 88 | (17) |
| 2017–2018 | Ternana | 36 | (7) |
| 2018–2019 | Cremonese | 30 | (1) |
| 2019–2021 | Cosenza | 64 | (9) |
| 2021–2022 | Perugia | 24 | (1) |
| 2022–2023 | Südtirol | 19 | (1) |
| 2023–2026 | Casertana | 63 | (7) |
| 2025–2026 | → Virtus Francavilla (loan) | 34 | (9) |
| 2026– | Brindisi | 0 | (0) |
- * Club domestic league appearances and goals as of 16 October 2026

Mirko Carretta (born 23 November 1990) is an Italian footballer who plays as a winger for Italian Serie D club Brindisi.

== Career ==
Born in Gallipoli, the Province of Lecce, Carretta started his career at Gallipoli Calcio. In 2009, Gallipoli were promoted to Serie B, but faced financial difficulties, which resulted in most of the players leaving the club. Carretta joined Serie D team Matera and scored 9 league goals, winning the Serie D cup and promotion playoffs. On 4 July 2010, he was signed by Lega Pro Prima Divisione side Andria BAT on a three-year contract. He received a call-up from the Lega Pro representative team against the Palestine U-23 team in June 2011 and again in November 2011.

In August 2011, he was signed by Lega Pro Prima Divisione team Benevento via Chievo.

On 13 July 2012, he left for Barletta along with Antonio Junior Vacca.

On 6 August 2019, he signed a two-year contract with Cosenza.

On 23 June 2021, he joined Perugia on a two-year contract.

On 21 June 2022, Carretta signed a two-year contract with Südtirol.

On 6 September 2023, Carretta moved to Casertana.
