= Samuele Angori =

Italian footballer

Personal information
- Date of birth: 7 October 2003 (age 23)
- Place of birth: Cortona, Italy
- Height: 1.86 m (6 ft 1 in)
- Position: Left-back

Team information
- Current team: Pisa
- Number: 3

Youth career
- 2008–2011: ASD Calcio Fratta
- 2011–2016: Fiorentina
- 2016–2022: Perugia
- 2021–2022: →Torino (loan)

Senior career*
| Years | Team | Apps | (Gls) |
| 2022–2023 | Perugia | 0 | (0) |
| 2022–2023 | → Empoli (loan) | 0 | (0) |
| 2023–2024 | Empoli | 0 | (0) |
| 2023–2024 | → Pontedera (loan) | 35 | (3) |
| 2024– | Pisa | 72 | (2) |

International career^{‡}
| 2023–2024 | Italy U20 | 3 | (0) |
| 2025– | Italy U21 | 1 | (0) |
- * Club domestic league appearances and goals as of 25 May 2026 ‡ National team caps and goals as of 16:51, 14 July 2025 (UTC)

Samuele Angori (born 7 October 2003) is an Italian professional footballer who plays as a left-back for Pisa.

== Club career ==
Angori began playing football with the youth academy of ASD Calcio Fratta at the age of 5 before moving to Fiorentina at the age of 8, and 5 years later moved to Perugia's youth sides to continue his development. On 31 August 2021 he signed his first professional contract with the Perugia until 2024, and immediately joined Torino's U19s on loan for the 2021–2022 season.

On 8 August 2022, Angori made his senior and professional debut with Perugia in a 3–2 Coppa Italia loss to Cagliari. The following season, he joined Empoli on loan where he was assigned to their Primavera side. On 18 July 2023, he formally transferred to Empoli. On 13 July 2023, he joined Pontedera on loan. On 2 August 2024, he transferred to the Serie B club Pisa. In his debut season with Pisa, he helped them come second in the 2024–25 Serie B and earned promotion to the Serie A.

== International career ==
Angori was first called up to play for the Italy U20s in October 2023. In March 2025, he was called up to the Italy U21s.
