= Francesco Coppola (footballer) =

Italian footballer (born 2005)

Personal information
- Date of birth: 11 April 2005 (age 21)
- Place of birth: Turin, Italy
- Height: 1.95 m (6 ft 5 in)
- Position: Centre-back

Team information
- Current team: Pisa
- Number: 26

Youth career
- Torino
- 2019–2022: Juventus
- 2022–2024: Pisa

Senior career*
| Years | Team | Apps | (Gls) |
| 2024– | Pisa | 7 | (0) |
| 2024–2025 | → Vis Pesaro (loan) | 29 | (3) |

International career
| 2025– | Italy U20 | 1 | (0) |
- * Club domestic league appearances and goals as of 25 May 2026

Francesco Coppola (born 11 April 2005) is an Italian professional footballer who plays as a centre-back for Serie B club Pisa.

== Career ==
Coppola is a youth product of Torino, Juventus and Pisa. On 16 August 2024, he joined Vis Pesaro on loan in the Serie C for the 2024–25 season. On 2 September 2024, he made his senior and professional debut with Vis Pesaro in a 3–0 Serie C win over Arezzo.

== International career ==
Born in Italy, Coppola is of Cuban descent through his mother and holds dual-citizenship. In March 2025, Coppola was called up to the Italy U20s for a friendly tournament.

== Career statistics ==
=== Club ===
As of match played 23 January 2026

Appearances and goals by club, season and competition
| Club | Season | League | | | Cup | | Europe | | Other | | Total | |
| Club | Season | Division | Apps | Goals | Apps | Goals | Apps | Goals | Apps | Goals | Apps | Goals |
|---|---|---|---|---|---|---|---|---|---|---|---|---|
| Vis Pesaro (loan) | 2024–25 | Serie C | 29 | 3 | 0 | 0 | — | | 6 | 0 | 35 | 3 |
| Pisa | 2025–26 | Serie A | 4 | 0 | 0 | 0 | — | | — | | 4 | 0 |
| Career total | | | 33 | 3 | 0 | 0 | 0 | 0 | 6 | 0 | 39 | 3 |

== Personal life ==
Coppola is of Cuban descent through his mother. Coppola is the brother of the professional footballers Domenico and Alessandro Coppola.
