= Nicholas Bonfanti =

Italian footballer

Personal information
- Date of birth: 28 March 2002 (age 24)
- Place of birth: Seriate, Italy
- Height: 1.78 m (5 ft 10 in)
- Position: Forward

Team information
- Current team: Carrarese (on loan from Pisa)
- Number: 21

Youth career
- Inter Milan

Senior career*
Years	Team	Apps	(Gls)
2021–2024	Modena	55	(17)
2024–	Pisa	30	(9)
2025	→ Bari (loan)	16	(2)
2025–2026	→ Mantova (loan)	12	(0)
2026–	→ Carrarese (loan)	1	(0)

International career^{‡}
2019	Italy U17	6	(3)
2020	Italy U18	1	(0)
2022	Italy U20	1	(0)
- * Club domestic league appearances and goals as of 19 September 2026 ‡ National team caps and goals as of 7 June 2022

Nicholas Bonfanti (born 28 March 2002) is an Italian professional footballer who plays as a forward for Serie B club Carrarese on loan from Pisa.

== Club career ==
Born in Seriate, Bonfanti joined to Inter Milan youth sector in 2017 from Virtus Bergramo.

On 14 July 2021, he left Inter and signed with Serie C club Modena. He made his professional debut on 12 September 2021 against Teramo.

In January 2024, Bonfanti signed for Pisa in a part-exchange deal for striker Ettore Gliozzi.

On 23 January 2025, Bonfanti moved on loan to Bari.

On 21 August 2025, he was loaned by Mantova, with an option to buy.

== International career ==
Bonfanti was a youth international for Italy U17 and Italy U18.
