= Arturo Calabresi =

Italian professional footballer (born 1996)

Personal information
- Date of birth: 17 March 1996 (age 30)
- Place of birth: Rome, Italy
- Height: 1.86 m (6 ft 1 in)
- Position: Centre back

Team information
- Current team: Pisa
- Number: 33

Youth career
- 2007–2015: Roma

Senior career*
Years	Team	Apps	(Gls)
2015–2018	Roma	0	(0)
2015–2016	→ Livorno (loan)	10	(1)
2016–2017	→ Brescia (loan)	44	(1)
2017–2018	→ Spezia (loan)	2	(0)
2018	→ Foggia (loan)	9	(0)
2018–2021	Bologna	19	(1)
2019–2020	→ Amiens (loan)	21	(1)
2021	→ Cagliari (loan)	2	(0)
2021–2022	Lecce	31	(0)
2022–	Pisa	106	(2)

International career^{‡}
2012–2013	Italy U17	16	(1)
2013–2014	Italy U18	8	(0)
2014–2015	Italy U19	12	(1)
2015–2016	Italy U20	7	(0)
2015–2019	Italy U21	9	(0)
- * Club domestic league appearances and goals as of 25 May 2026 ‡ National team caps and goals as of 22 June 2019

Arturo Calabresi (17 March 1996) is an Italian professional footballer who plays as a centre back for Serie B club Pisa.

== Club career ==
=== Roma ===
Calabresi is a product of A.S. Roma's youth academy where he played since 2007. On 24 July 2014, Calabresi made his unofficial debut for Roma in a friendly match, as a substitute replacing Ashley Cole in the 62nd minute of a 1–0 win over Liverpool.

==== Loan to Livorno ====
In the summer of 2015, he was loaned to Livorno in Serie B on a six-month loan deal. On 8 August, Calabresi made his debut for Livorno as a substitute replacing Federico Ceccherini in the 66th minute of the second round of Coppa Italia in a match won 2–0, after extra-time, against Ancona. On 16 August, he played in the third round of Coppa Italia, where he was replaced by Federico Ceccherini in the 104th minute of a match lost 2–0, after extra-time, against Carpi. Calabresi made his Serie B debut on 12 September in a 2–1 away win over Como. On 18 September, he scored his first professional goal in the 68th minute of a 3–1 home win over Brescia. Calabresi finished his loan at Livorno with 12 appearances and one goal.

==== Loan to Brescia ====
At mid season, during the January 2016 transfer window, Calabresi was sent on loan again, this time to Brescia in Serie B on an 18-month loan deal, with an option to buy. On 6 February, Calabresi made his debut for Brescia in Serie B in a 2–1 away defeat against Pro Vercelli. On 11 April, he scored his first goal for Brescia in the 94th minute of a 2–2 home draw against Perugia. On 9 May, he received a red card in the 66th minute of a 2–1 away defeat against Spezia. Calabresi ended his second part of the season with Brescia with 14 appearances, one goal and an assist.

Calabresi played his first match of the season on 7 August in the second round of Coppa Italia in a 2–0 home defeat against Pisa. On 27 August, he played his first Serie B match of the season, a 1–1 away draw against Avellino. On 21 January 2017, he was sent off for two yellow cards in the 65th minute of a 2–0 home defeat against Avellino. Calabresi ended his loan with Brescia with 31 appearances, in total he made 44 appearances, a goal and an assist for Brescia.

==== Loan to Spezia and Foggia ====
On 7 July 2018, Calabresi was signed by Serie B side Spezia on a season-long loan deal. On 19 September_he made his debut for Spezia as a substitute. He replaced Luca Vignali in the 60th minute of a 1–0 home win against Novara. On 23 September, Calabresi played his first match as a starter, a 2–0 away defeat against Salernitana. In January 2018, Calabresi was re-called to Roma leaving Spezia with only two appearances.

On 23 January 2018, he moved to Serie B club Foggia on a six-month loan deal.

=== Bologna and loan to Cagliari ===
On 21 June 2018, Bologna confirmed the signing of Calabresi from Roma for an undisclosed fee.

On 22 January 2021, he joined Cagliari on loan.

=== Lecce ===
On 29 July 2021, he joined Lecce on a permanent basis.

=== Pisa ===
On 11 August 2022, Calabresi signed a three-year contract with Pisa.

== International career ==
With the Italy U17 side, he took part at the 2013 UEFA European Under-17 Championship and at the 2013 FIFA U-17 World Cup.

On 12 August 2015, he made his debut with the Italy U21 team, as a substitute replacing Francesco Vicari in the 46th minute in a friendly match against Hungary.

== Personal life ==
He is the son of Italian actor and television personality Paolo Calabresi; as a kid, he also made a short appearance in 2010 in an episode of the TV series Boris as the son of the character played by his father.

== Career statistics ==
=== Club ===
As of match played 13 May 2025

Appearances and goals by club, season and competition
Club	Season	League			Cup		Europe		Other		Total	
Club	Season	Division	Apps	Goals	Apps	Goals	Apps	Goals	Apps	Goals	Apps	Goals
Roma	2014–15	Serie A	0	0	0	0	0	0	—		0	0
Livorno (loan)	2015–16	Serie B	10	1	2	0	—		—		12	1
Brescia (loan)	2015–16	Serie B	14	1	—		—		—		14	1
Brescia (loan)	2016–17	Serie B	30	0	1	0	—		—		31	0
Brescia (loan)	Total		44	1	1	0	—		—		45	1
Spezia (loan)	2017–18	Serie B	2	0	0	0	—		—		2	0
Foggia (loan)	2017–18	Serie B	9	0	—		—		—		9	0
Bologna	2018–19	Serie A	18	1	3	0	—		—		21	1
Bologna	2020–21	Serie A	1	0	1	0	—		—		2	0
Bologna	Total		19	1	4	0	—		—		23	1
Amiens (loan)	2019–20	Ligue 1	21	1	1	0	—		3 (Note: Appearance in the Coupe de la Ligue)	0	25	1
Cagliari (loan)	2020–21	Serie A	2	0	0	0	—		—		2	0
Lecce	2021–22	Serie B	31	0	3	2	—		—		34	2
Pisa	2022–23	Serie B	26	0	1	0	—		—		27	0
Pisa	2023–24	Serie B	26	2	0	0	—		—		26	2
Pisa	2024–25	Serie B	28	0	2	0	—		—		30	0
Pisa	Total		80	2	3	0	—		—		83	2
Career total			218	6	14	2	0	0	3	0	235	8
