= Filippo Oliana =

Italian footballer

Personal information
- Date of birth: 30 June 1999 (age 27)
- Place of birth: Genoa, Italy
- Height: 1.83 m (6 ft 0 in)
- Position: Defender

Team information
- Current team: Carrarese
- Number: 6

Youth career
- –2018: Sampdoria

Senior career*
Years	Team	Apps	(Gls)
2018–2019	Sampdoria	0	(0)
2018–2019	→ Albissola (loan)	26	(0)
2019–2020	Rimini	8	(0)
2020	Monopoli	0	(0)
2020–2022	Nuova Florida	52	(0)
2022–2024	Sestri Levante	75	(2)
2024–	Carrarese	46	(1)
- * Club domestic league appearances and goals as of 13 May 2026

Filippo Oliana (born 30 June 1999) is an Italian footballer who plays for Serie B club Carrarese.

== Club career ==
He is a product of Sampdoria youth teams and started playing for their Under-19 squad in the 2016–17 season.

On 11 July 2018, he joined Serie C club Albissola on a season-long loan. He made his Serie C debut for Albissola on 4 November 2018 in a game against Carrarese as a starter.

On 29 January 2020, he moved to Monopoli until the end of the season.

On 13 July 2024, Oliana signed with Carrarese.
