= Bossa Nova Robotics =

Robotics startup

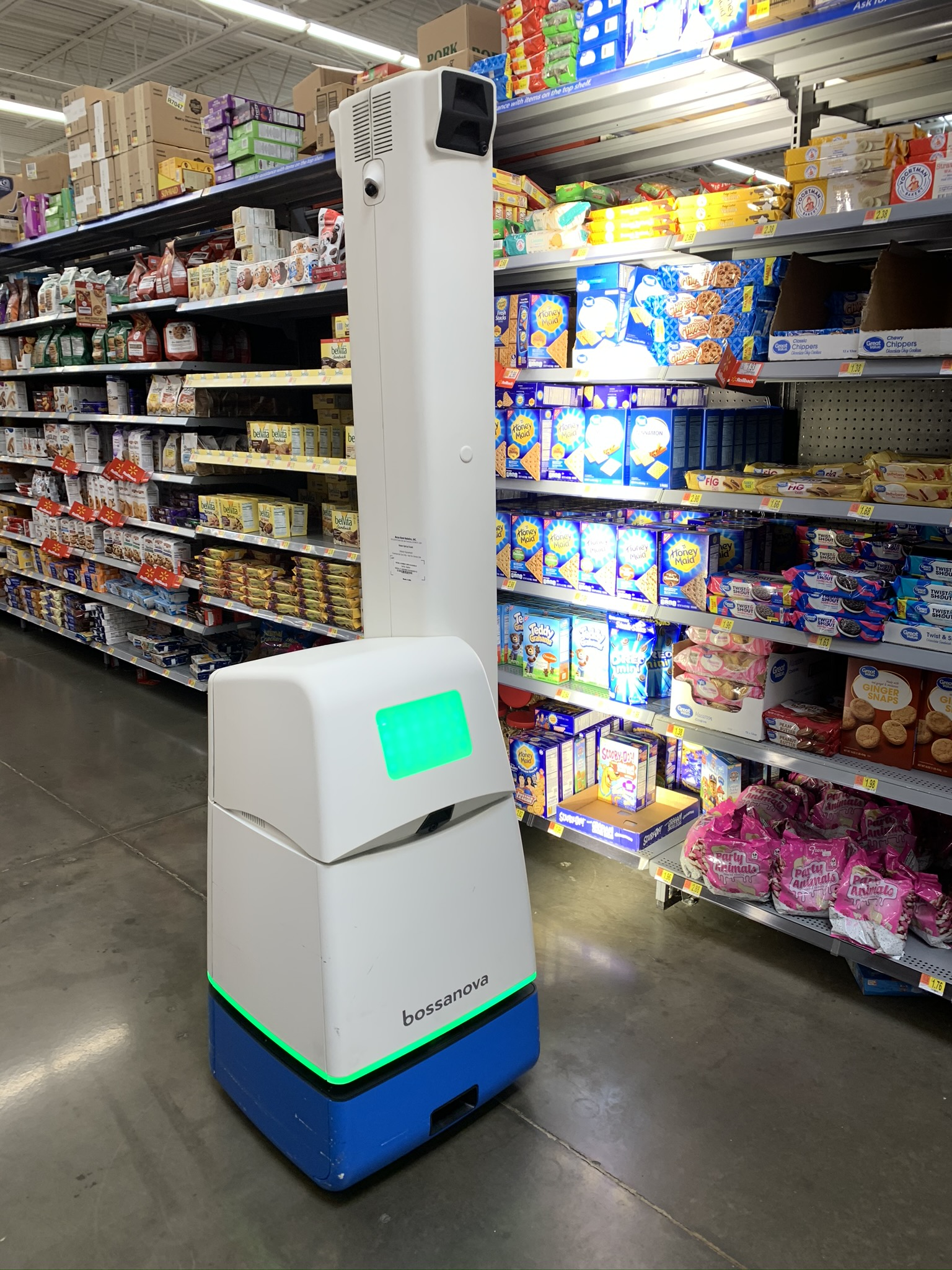
- A Bossa Nova robot scanning a shelf at a Walmart in Auburn, Washington, in 2019
- Type: Private
- Industry: Robotics
- Founded: 2005; 21 years ago in Pittsburgh, Pennsylvania, United States
- Founders: Sarjoun Skaff; Martin Hitch
- Headquarters: San Francisco, California, United States
- Key people: Sarjoun Skaff (CEO); Jurgen Lew (CFO)
- Website: www.bossanova.com

Bossa Nova Robotics is a startup robotics company that manufactures inventory control robots for use in retail stores. They are best known for an attempt to use these robots in Walmart stores, in Walmart's effort to better compete with Amazon.

In 2018, Bossa Nova Robotics received $29 million in a funding round led by Cota Capital to go towards international expansion, software improvements and deployment of their robots. China Walden Ventures, LG Electronics, Intel Capital, Lucas Venture Group, and WRV Capital also participated.

Their Auto-S line of robots scanned store shelves by beaming light on them and snapping photos using 2D and 3D cameras, as well as utilizing lidar to navigate and detect if anything was stocked in a shelf. From this it could detect out-of-stock items, incorrect prices, and other irregularities.

== History ==
Bossa Nova was founded in 2005 by students attending Carnegie Mellon University, spinning out from their Robotics Institute. They began creating robotic toys, such as a robotic penguin and a programmable gorilla, though they did not see much success on the market. In 2012, Bossa Nova unveiled a ballbot named mObi, which featured a tablet screen on the top and was to act as a personal assistant.

Bossa Nova began working with Walmart to build their retail robots in 2014, though they did not have a finished version of the product until 2017, when Walmart began testing them in 50 stores. Other, smaller stores also began to test out the product, and Walmart rolled out an additional 300 robots in 2019. The robots moved at 20 centimeters a second on four wheels and used sensors to navigate around objects and shoppers.

In July 2018, the company acquired Hawxeye, a computer vision and facial recognition software company.

Walmart ended its contract with Bossa Nova in late 2020, triggering Bossa Nova to lay off more than 61 workers and close its European robotics division. Bossa Nova co-founder Sarjoun Skaff stated that "I cannot comment on Walmart, however, the pandemic has forced us to streamline our operations and focus on our core technologies. We have made stunning advances in AI and robotics. Our retail AI is the industry's best and works as well on robots as with fixed cameras, and our hardware, autonomy and operations excelled in more than 500 of the world's most challenging stores. With the board's full support, we continue deploying this technology with our partners in retail and in other fields."

Walmart's decision to change course with Bossa Nova shows how companies need to evaluate how robots may or may not work well in less-structured settings.
