= Simone Canestrelli =

Italian footballer

Personal information
- Date of birth: 11 September 2000 (age 26)
- Place of birth: Montepulciano, Italy
- Height: 1.95 m (6 ft 5 in)
- Position: Centre-back

Team information
- Current team: Pisa
- Number: 5

Youth career
- 2017–2019: Empoli

Senior career*
Years	Team	Apps	(Gls)
2017–2019	Empoli	0	(0)
2019–2021	AlbinoLeffe	74	(4)
2021–2023	Empoli	0	(0)
2021–2022	→ Crotone (loan)	26	(2)
2022–2023	→ Pisa (loan)	12	(2)
2023–	Pisa	108	(7)
2023	→ Como (loan)	5	(0)

International career^{‡}
2015	Italy U15	7	(0)
2015	Italy U16	7	(0)
2016	Italy U17	2	(0)
2018	Italy U19	3	(1)
2021–	Italy U21	2	(3)
- * Club domestic league appearances and goals as of 25 May 2026 ‡ National team caps and goals as of 26 September 2022

Simone Canestrelli (born 11 September 2000) is an Italian professional footballer who plays as a defender for Serie B club Pisa.

== Club career ==
In July 2019, Canestrelli moved to Serie C club AlbinoLeffe on a free transfer.

On 1 July 2021, Empoli exercised their right to buy Canestrelli back from AlbinoLeffe.

On 27 August 2021, he joined Crotone on loan. On 18 July 2022, Canestrelli was loaned to Pisa. On 30 January 2023, Pisa exercised their option to make Canestrelli's transfer permanent. On the next day, he was loaned by Pisa to Como.
