= Gabriele Piccinini =

Italian footballer

Personal information
- Date of birth: 6 April 2001 (age 25)
- Place of birth: Scandiano, Italy
- Height: 1.84 m (6 ft 0 in)
- Position: Forward

Team information
- Current team: Pisa
- Number: 36

Youth career
- –2011: Reggiana
- 2011–2014: Parma
- 2014–2016: Sassuolo
- 2016–2019: Reggiana

Senior career*
Years	Team	Apps	(Gls)
2018–2020	Reggiana	10	(0)
2019–2020	→ Lentigione (loan)	23	(6)
2020–2021	Lentigione	35	(10)
2021–	Pisa	95	(5)
2022	→ Fiorenzuola (loan)	16	(0)
2023	→ Fiorenzuola (loan)	16	(1)
- * Club domestic league appearances and goals as of 25 May 2026

Gabriele Piccinini (born 6 April 2001) is an Italian footballer who plays as a forward for Serie B club Pisa.

== Club career ==
He spent the first three seasons of his senior career in the fourth-tier Serie D.

On 15 July 2021, he signed a three-year contract with Serie B club Pisa.

He made his Serie B debut for Pisa on 22 August 2021 against SPAL. On 31 January 2022, Piccinini was loaned to Fiorenzuola. On 7 January 2023, he was loaned to Fiorenzuola once more.

== Personal life ==
His younger brother Stefano Piccinini is also a football player.
