= Stefano Moreo =

Italian footballer

Personal information
- Date of birth: 30 June 1993 (age 33)
- Place of birth: Milan, Italy
- Height: 1.91 m (6 ft 3 in)
- Position: Striker

Team information
- Current team: Pisa
- Number: 32

Senior career*
Years	Team	Apps	(Gls)
2011–2013	Caronnese	40	(14)
2013–2017	Virtus Entella	34	(6)
2015–2016	→ Teramo (loan)	33	(6)
2016–2017	→ Venezia (loan)	34	(10)
2017	Venezia	20	(3)
2018–2019	Palermo	46	(6)
2019–2022	Empoli	47	(4)
2021–2022	→ Brescia (loan)	41	(10)
2022–2023	Brescia	19	(2)
2023–	Pisa	122	(20)
- * Club domestic league appearances and goals as of 25 May 2026

Stefano Moreo (born 30 June 1993) is an Italian professional footballer who plays as a striker for Serie A club Pisa.

== Club career ==
On 15 June 2022, Brescia purchased his rights after the loan in the 2021–22 season.

On 20 January 2023, Moreo joined Pisa.
