= 2017–18 Coppa Italia =

Tournament details
- Country: Italy
- Dates: 29 July 2017 – 9 May 2018
- Teams: 78

Final positions
- Champions: Juventus (13th title)
- Runners-up: Milan

Tournament statistics
- Matches played: 79
- Goals scored: 239 (3.03 per match)
- Top goal scorer(s): Alberto Cerri; Matteo Di Piazza; Maxi López (4 goals each)

The 2017–18 Coppa Italia, also known as TIM Cup for sponsorship reasons, was the 71st edition of the national domestic tournament. As a minimum, the winners of the Coppa Italia earn a place in the 2018–19 UEFA Europa League group stage unless they qualify for a more favourable UEFA placing based on league play. Seventy-eight clubs participated in this season's cup competition.

Juventus won the title for a record-extending 13th time by defeating Milan 4–0, and extended their record consecutive win streak to four. They had defeated Lazio (in 2014–15 and 2016–17) and Milan (in 2015–16). They did not concede a goal in any of the five games played in this year's competition, outscoring their opponents 10–0 on aggregate.

== Participating teams ==
=== Serie A (20 teams) ===
- Atalanta
- Benevento
- Bologna
- Cagliari
- Chievo
- Crotone
- Fiorentina
- Genoa
- Hellas Verona
- Internazionale
- Juventus
- Lazio
- Milan
- Napoli
- Roma
- Sampdoria
- Sassuolo
- SPAL
- Torino
- Udinese

=== Serie B (22 teams) ===
- Ascoli
- Avellino
- Bari
- Brescia
- Carpi
- Cesena
- Cittadella
- Cremonese
- Empoli
- Foggia
- Frosinone
- Novara
- Palermo
- Parma
- Perugia
- Pescara
- Pro Vercelli
- Salernitana
- Spezia
- Ternana
- Venezia
- Virtus Entella

=== Serie C (27 teams) ===
- AlbinoLeffe
- Alessandria
- Arezzo
- Bassano Virtus
- Casertana
- Cosenza
- FeralpiSalò
- Giana Erminio
- Gubbio
- Juve Stabia
- Lecce
- Livorno
- Lucchese
- Matera
- Padova
- Paganese
- Pro Piacenza
- Piacenza
- Pisa
- Pordenone
- Reggiana
- Renate
- Sambenedettese
- Siracusa
- Trapani
- Vicenza
- Virtus Francavilla

=== Serie D (9 teams) ===
- Nuova Monterosi
- Massese
- Varese
- Trastevere
- Imolese
- Rende
- Triestina
- Ciliverghe Mazzano
- Matelica

== Format and seeding ==
Teams entered the competition at various stages, as follows:

- First phase (one-legged fixtures)
  - First round: 36 teams from Serie C and Serie D started the tournament
  - Second round: the eighteen winners from the previous round were joined by the 22 Serie B teams
  - Third round: the twenty winners from the second round met the twelve Serie A sides seeded 9–20
  - Fourth round: the sixteen winners faced each other
- Second phase
  - Round of 16 (one-legged): the eight fourth round winners were inserted into a bracket with the Serie A clubs seeded 1–8
  - Quarter-finals (one-legged)
  - Semi-finals (two-legged)
- Final (one-legged)

== Round dates ==
The schedule of each round was as follows:

Phase	Round	First leg	Second leg
First stage	First round	29–30 July 2017	
First stage	Second round	5–6 August 2017	
First stage	Third round	11–13 August 2017	
First stage	Fourth round	29 November 2017	
Final stage	Round of 16	13–20 December 2017	
Final stage	Quarter-finals	27 December 2017 & 3 January 2018	
Final stage	Semi-finals	31 January 2018	28 February 2018
Final stage	Final	9 May 2018	

== First stage ==
=== First round ===
A total of 36 teams from Serie C and Serie D competed in this round, eighteen of which advanced to second round. The first round matches were played between 29 and 30 July 2017.

29 July 2017	Arezzo (3)	0–1	Triestina (4)	Arezzo
18:00 CEST			Mensah 10'	Stadium: Stadio Città di Arezzo; Attendance: 780; Referee: Alessandro Dionisi

30 July 2017	Renate (3)	3–1	Siracusa (3)	Renate
16:00 CEST	Simonetti 8'; Lunetta 58'; Gomez 90'	Report	Mancino 85' (pen.)	Stadium: Stadio Città di Meda
Note: Tie reversed from the original draw.

30 July 2017	Trastevere (4)	1–2	Reggiana (3)	Rome
16:30 CEST	Sfanò 47'	Report	Cesarini 5'; Cotani 71' (o.g.)	Stadium: Trastevere Stadium
Note: Tie reversed from the original draw.

30 July 2017	Virtus Francavilla (3)	3–1	Imolese (4)	Brindisi
17:00 CEST	Nzola 11'; Abruzzese 54'; Viola 68'	Report	Ferretti 73' (rig.)	Stadium: Stadio France Franuzzi

30 July 2017	Vicenza (3)	4–1	Pro Piacenza (3)	Vicenza
18:00 CEST	Giacomelli 35', 43'; Malomo 73'; De Giorgio 87' (pen.)	Report	Barba 22'	Stadium: Stadio Romeo Menti

30 July 2017	Piacenza (3)	1–0	Massese (4)	Piacenza
20:30 CEST	Scaccabarozzi 66'	Report		Stadium: Stadio Leonardo Garilli

30 July 2017	Sambenedettese (3)	2–0 (a.e.t.)	Lucchese (3)	San Benedetto del Tronto
20:30 CEST	Tomi 95'; Di Massimo 97'	Report		Stadium: Stadio Riviera delle Palme

30 July 2017	Trapani (3)	6–0	Paganese (3)	Erice
20:30 CEST	Murano 14', 60'; Canotto 15', 44'; Fornito 72'; Ferretti 85'	Report		Stadium: Stadio Polisportivo Provinciale

30 July 2017	Livorno (3)	0–0 (a.e.t.) (5–4 p)	FeralpiSalò (3)	Livorno
20:30 CEST		Report		Stadium: Stadio Armando Picchi
	Penalties
	Valiani (penalty scored); Murilo (penalty scored); Pedrelli (penalty scored); Gasbarro (penalty scored); Doumbia (penalty scored)		(penalty scored) Capodaglio; (penalty scored) Surraco; (penalty scored) Emerson B.; (penalty scored) Marchi; (penalty missed) Luche

30 July 2017	Cosenza (3)	2–3 (a.e.t.)	Alessandria (3)	Cosenza
20:30 CEST	Fissore 86' (o.g.); Pascali 105'	Report	Cazzola 90+1'; Celjak 108'; Casasola 115'	Stadium: Stadio San Vito
Note: Tie reversed from the original draw

30 July 2017	Pisa (3)	3–1	Varese (4)	Pisa
20:30 CEST	Eusepi 33' (pen.), 60', 90+2'	Report	Palazzolo 11'	Stadium: Stadio Arena Garibaldi

30 July 2017	Gubbio (3)	1–0	Nuova Monterosi (4)	Gubbio
20:30 CEST	Valagussa 50'	Report		Stadium: Stadio Pietro Barbetti

30 July 2017	Matera (3)	2–0	Casertana (3)	Matera
20:30 CEST	Corado 19'; Giovinco 62'	Report		Stadium: Stadio XXI Settembre

30 July 2017	Lecce (3)	3–0	Ciliverghe Mazzano (4)	Lecce
20:30 CEST	Caturano 25'; Lepore 80' (pen.); Torromino 82'	Report		Stadium: Stadio Via del Mare

30 July 2017	Pordenone (3)	2–0	Matelica (4)	Pordenone
20:30 CEST	Buratto 21'; Burrai 90' (pen.)	Report		Stadium: Stadio Ottavio Bottecchia

30 July 2017	Padova (3)	2–1 (a.e.t.)	Rende (4)	Padua
20:30 CEST	Marcandella 3', 109'		Goretta 34' (pen.)	Stadium: Stadio Euganeo

30 July 2017	Giana Erminio (3)	1–3	AlbinoLeffe (3)	Gorgonzola
20:30 CEST	Perna 79'	Report	Ravaso 36'; Perico 52' (o.g.); Agnello 89'	Stadium: Stadio Comunale Città di Gorgonzola

30 July 2017	Juve Stabia (3)	3–1	Bassano Virtus (3)	Caserta
20:45 CEST	Berardi 12'; Strefezza 45+1'; Nava 66'	Report	Minesso 40'	Stadium: Stadio Alberto Pinto

=== Second round ===
A total of forty teams from Serie B, Serie C and Serie D competed in the second round, twenty of which advanced to join twelve teams from Serie A in the third round. The second round matches were played on 5 and 6 August 2017.

5 August 2017	Spezia (2)	3–0	Reggiana (3)	La Spezia
18:00 CEST	Ceccaroni 41'; Viganli 48'; Sciaudone 82'	Report		Stadium: Stadio Alberto Picco

5 August 2017	Ascoli (2)	3–2	Juve Stabia (3)	Ascoli Piceno
18:00 CEST	Favilli 27' (pen.), 60'; De Feo 75'	Report	Paponi 32', 78'	Stadium: Stadio Cino e Lillo Del Duca

5 August 2017	Pro Vercelli (2)	1–2	Lecce (3)	Vercelli
20:30 CEST	Firenze 61'	Report	Di Piazza 36', 46'	Stadium: Stadio Silvio Piola

5 August 2017	Empoli (2)	2–2 (a.e.t.) (3–4 p)	Renate (3)	Empoli
20:30 CEST	Piu 55'; Napoli 120+1' (o.g.)	Report	Gomez 47' (pen.); Palma 118'	Stadium: Stadio Carlo Castellani
	Penalties
	Pasqual (penalty scored); Zajc (penalty scored); Castagnetti (penalty scored); Donnarumma (penalty missed); El Kaddouri (penalty missed); Veseli (penalty missed)		(penalty scored) Palma; (penalty scored) Simonetti; (penalty missed) Finocchio; (penalty missed) Napoli; (penalty scored) Antezza; (penalty scored) Di Gennaro

6 August 2017	Cesena (2)	2–1	Sambenedettese (3)	Cesena
20:45 CEST	Laribi 16' (pen.); Vita 56'	Report	Valente 90+1'	Stadium: Stadio Dino Manuzzi

6 August 2017	Novara (2)	1–2	Piacenza (3)	Novara
18:30 CEST	Macheda 90+4'	Report	Federzoli 41'; Morosini 72'	Stadium: Stadio Silvio Piola

6 August 2017	Ternana (2)	0–1	Trapani (3)	Terni
20:45 CEST		Report	Murano 86'	Stadium: Stadio Libero Liberati

6 August 2017	Carpi (2)	4–0	Livorno (3)	Carpi
20:30 CEST	Mbagoku 5' (pen.), 59'; Verna 15'; Jawo 24'	Report		Stadium: Stadio Sandro Cabassi

6 August 2017	Salernitana (2)	2–1	Alessandria (3)	Salerno
20:30 CEST	Bocalon 18'; Sprocati 83'	Report	Marconi 35'	Stadium: Stadio Arechi

6 August 2017	Virtus Entella (2)	0–1	Cremonese (2)	Chiavari
20:30 CEST		Report	Pesce 45+1'	Stadium: Stadio Comunale

6 August 2017	Bari (2)	2–1	Parma (2)	Bari
21:15 CEST	Galano 36', 90'	Report	Calaiò 2' (pen.)	Stadium: Stadio San Nicola

6 August 2017	Pisa (3)	0–1	Frosinone (2)	Pisa
20:30 CEST		Report	Ciofani 31'	Stadium: Stadio Arena Garibaldi
Note: Tie reversed from the original draw.

6 August 2017	Perugia (2)	2–1	Gubbio (3)	Perugia
20:45 CEST	Brighi 51'; Buonaiuto 65'	Report	Cazzola 68'	Stadium: Stadio Renato Curi

6 August 2017	Avellino (2)	1–0	Matera (3)	Avellino
20:30 CEST	D'Angelo 11'	Report		Stadium: Stadio Partenio-Adriano Lombardi

6 August 2017	Palermo (2)	5–0	Virtus Francavilla (3)	Palermo
20:30 CEST	Trajkovski 13', 45+2', 72'; Aleesami 66'; Murawski 80'	Report		Stadium: Stadio Renzo Barbera

6 August 2017	Venezia (2)	1–2	Pordenone (3)	Venice
18:30 CEST	Moreo 60'	Report	Martinago 13'; Burrai 77'	Stadium: Stadio Pier Luigi Penzo

6 August 2017	Vicenza (3)	1–3	Foggia (2)	Vicenza
	De Giorgio 51' (pen.)	Report	Mazzeo 41', 69'; Milinkovic 71'	Stadium: Stadio Romeo Menti
Note: Tie reversed from the original draw.

6 August 2017	Brescia (2)	1–0	Padova (3)	Brescia
	Torregrossa 15'	Report		Stadium: Stadio Mario Rigamonti

6 August 2017	Pescara (2)	5–3 (a.e.t.)	Triestina (4)	Pescara
20:30 CEST	Pettinari 27'; Brugman 39'; Ganz 90+2' (pen.); Coulibaly 94'; Del Sole 116'	Report	Aquaro 4'; Arma 45', 85'	Stadium: Stadio Adriatico

6 August 2017	Cittadella (2)	2–1	AlbinoLeffe (3)	Cittadella
20:00 CEST	Schenetti 32'; Arrighini 76'	Report	Ravasio 66'	Stadium: Stadio Pier Cesare Tombolato

=== Third round ===
A total of 32 teams from Serie A, Serie B and Serie C competed in the third round, sixteen of which advanced to the fourth round. The third round matches were played from 11–13 August 2017.

11 August 2017	Torino (1)	7–1	Trapani (3)	Turin
	Belotti 13', 39'; Fazio 27' (o.g.); Berenguer 35'; Joel Obi 43'; Falque 68'; De Silvestri 87'		Fazio 18'	Stadium: Stadio Olimpico Grande Torino; Referee: Fabrizio Pasqua

12 August 2017	Crotone (1)	2–1	Piacenza (3)	Crotone
	Barberis 18'; Ceccherini 83'		Bini 61'	Stadium: Stadio Ezio Scida; Referee: Riccardo Pinzani

12 August 2017	Bari (2)	2–1	Cremonese (2)	Bari
	Salzano 29'; Nenê 41'		Brighenti 8'	Stadium: Stadio San Nicola

12 August 2017	Sassuolo (1)	2–0	Spezia (2)	Reggio Emilia
	Missiroli 8'; Berardi 28'			Stadium: Mapei Stadium – Città del Tricolore; Referee: Luca Pairetto

12 August 2017	Brescia (2)	1–3	Pescara (2)	Brescia
	Bisoli 34'		Capone 30'; Del Sole 57', 81'	Stadium: Stadio Mario Rigamonti

12 August 2017	Udinese (1)	3–2	Frosinone (2)	Udine
	Théréau 29'; Lasagna 63'; Jankto 72'		Gori 38'; Crivello 78'	Stadium: Stadio Friuli; Referee: Piero Giacomelli

12 August 2017	Benevento (1)	0–4	Perugia (2)	Benevento
			Cerri 43', 70', 75' (pen.); Emmanuello 88'	Stadium: Stadio Ciro Vigorito

12 August 2017	Chievo (1)	2–1	Ascoli (2)	Verona
	Birsa 27'; Cacciatore 90+5'		Favilli 68'	Stadium: Stadio Marc'Antonio Bentegodi; Referee: Maurizio Mariani

12 August 2017	Cagliari (1)	1–1 (a.e.t.) (4–2 p)	Palermo (2)	Turin
	João Pedro 45'		La Gumina 66'	Stadium: Stadio Olimpico Grande Torino
	Penalties
	Cigarini (penalty scored); Čop (penalty scored); Sau (penalty scored); Cossu (penalty scored)		(penalty missed) Jajalo; (penalty missed) Aleesami; (penalty scored) Struna; (penalty scored) La Gumina

12 August 2017	Carpi (2)	3–3 (a.e.t.) (4–3 p)	Salernitana (2)	Carpi
	Malcore 72' (pen.); Concas 79'; Nzola 102'		Minala 2'; Zito 32'; Bocalon 91'	Stadium: Stadio Sandro Cabassi
	Penalties
	Mbakogu (penalty scored); Malcore (penalty scored); Jelenič (penalty missed); Nzola (penalty scored); Concas (penalty scored)		(penalty missed) Rosina; (penalty scored) Minala; (penalty missed) Bocalon; (penalty scored) Tuia; (penalty scored) Vitale

12 August 2017	Sampdoria (1)	3–0	Foggia (2)	Genoa
	Barreto 21'; Caprari 76'; Kownacki 80'			Stadium: Stadio Luigi Ferraris

12 August 2017	Pordenone (3)	3–2	Lecce (3)	Pordenone
	Raffini 79'; Burrai 83' (pen.); Parodi 89'		Di Piazza 7', 48'	Stadium: Stadio Ottavio Bottecchia

12 August 2017	Bologna (1)	0–3	Cittadella (2)	Bologna
			Kouamé 20'; Pasa 41'; Litteri 45+1'	Stadium: Stadio Renato Dall'Ara; Referee: Rosario Abisso

12 August 2017	SPAL (1)	1–0	Renate (3)	Ferrera
	Vicari 28'			Stadium: Stadio Paolo Mazza

13 August 2017	Genoa (1)	2–1 (a.e.t.)	Cesena (2)	Genoa
	Simeone 51'; Laxalt 95'		Laribi 36' (pen.)	Stadium: Stadio Luigi Ferraris; Referee: Gianluca Manganiello

13 August 2017	Hellas Verona (1)	3–1	Avellino (2)	Verona
	Verde 34', 38'; Zuculini 87'		Castaldo 49'	Stadium: Stadio Marc'Antonio Bentegodi; Referee: Paolo Mazzoleni

=== Fourth round ===
The fourth round matches were played between 28–30 November 2017. All times were CET (UTC+1).

28 November 2017	Cagliari (1)	1–2	Pordenone (3)	Cagliari
15:00	Dessena 18'		Ángel 8'; Bassoli 62'	Stadium: Sardegna Arena; Referee: Fabio Piscopo

28 November 2017	SPAL (1)	0–2	Cittadella (2)	Ferrara
18:00			Konate 13' (o.g.); Schenetti 87'	Stadium: Paolo Mazza; Referee: Valerio Marini

28 November 2017	Sampdoria (1)	4–1	Pescara (2)	Genoa
21:00	Kownacki 2', 74'; Ramírez 9'; Caprari 31'		Benali 53'	Stadium: Stadio Luigi Ferraris; Referee: Francesco Fourneau

29 November 2017	Sassuolo (1)	2–1	Bari (2)	Sassuolo
15:00	Falcinelli 34'; Politano 90+3'		Nenê 64' (pen.)	Stadium: Mapei Stadium – Città del Tricolore; Referee: Luigi Pillitteri

29 November 2017	Chievo (1)	1–1 (a.e.t.) (4–5 p)	Hellas Verona (1)	Verona
18:00	Pellissier 8'		Fares 34'	Stadium: Stadio Marc'Antonio Bentegodi; Referee: Maurizio Mariani
	Penalties
	Pellissier (penalty missed); Cacciatore (penalty scored); Dainelli (penalty scored); Radovanović (penalty scored); Inglese (penalty scored)		(penalty scored) Rômulo; (penalty scored) Fossati; (penalty scored) Verde; (penalty scored) Tupta; (penalty scored) B. Zuculini

29 November 2017	Torino (1)	2–0	Carpi (2)	Turin
21:00	Falque 18'; Belotti 32'			Stadium: Stadio Olimpico Grande Torino; Attendance: Lorenzo Illuzzi

30 November 2017	Udinese (1)	8–3	Perugia (2)	Udine
18:00	Danilo 17'; Maxi López 34' (pen.), 49', 63' (pen.), 71'; Lasagna 40'; Ingelsson 82'; Jankto 86'		Cerri 45' (pen.); Bianco 55'; Mustacchio 61'	Stadium: Stadio Friuli; Referee: Luigi Nasca

30 November 2017	Genoa (1)	1–0	Crotone (1)	Genoa
21:00	Migliore 54'			Stadium: Stadio Luigi Ferraris; Referee: Gianluca Manganiello

== Final stage ==
=== Bracket ===
Round of 16
Napoli (1)	1
Udinese (1)	0
Atalanta (1)	2
Sassuolo (1)	1
Juventus (1)	2
Genoa (1)	0
Roma (1)	1
Torino (1)	2
Milan (1)	3
Hellas Verona (1)	0
Internazionale (1) (p)	0 (5)
Pordenone (3)	0 (4)
Lazio (1)	4
Cittadella (2)	1
Fiorentina (1)	3
Sampdoria (1)	2

Quarter-finals
Napoli	1
Atalanta	2
Juventus	2
Torino	0
Milan (a.e.t.)	1
Internazionale	0
Lazio	1
Fiorentina	0

Semi-finals
Atalanta	0	0	0
Juventus	1	1	2
Milan (p)	0	0 (5)	0 (5)
Lazio	0	0 (4)	0 (4)

Final
Juventus	4
Milan	0

==== Round of 16 ====
Round of 16 matches were played from 12–20 December 2017.

12 December 2017	Internazionale (1)	0–0 (a.e.t.) (5–4 p)	Pordenone (3)	Milan
21:00 CET (UTC+1)		Report		Stadium: San Siro; Attendance: 25,956; Referee: Juan Luca Sacchi
	Penalties
	Brozović (penalty scored); Perišić (penalty scored); Škriniar (penalty missed); Gagliardini (penalty missed); Icardi (penalty scored); Vecino (penalty scored); Nagatomo (penalty scored)		(penalty missed) Misuraca; (penalty scored) Burrai; (penalty scored) Magnaghi; (penalty missed) Lulli; (penalty scored) Stefani; (penalty scored) Ciurria; (penalty missed) Parodi

13 December 2017	Fiorentina (1)	3–2	Sampdoria (1)	Florence
17:30 CET (UTC+1)	Babacar 2'; Veretout 59' (pen.), 90' (pen.)	Report	Barreto 39'; Ramírez 77' (pen.)	Stadium: Stadio Artemio Franchi; Attendance: 7,038; Referee: Rosario Abisso

13 December 2017	Milan (1)	3–0	Hellas Verona (1)	Milan
21:00 CET (UTC+1)	Suso 22'; Romagnoli 30'; Cutrone 55'	Report		Stadium: San Siro; Attendance: 9,263; Referee: Claudio Gavillucci

14 December 2017	Lazio (1)	4–1	Cittadella (2)	Rome
21:00 CET (UTC+1)	Immobile 11', 87'; Felipe Anderson 24'; Camigliano 36' (o.g.)	Report	Bartolomei 41'	Stadium: Stadio Olimpico; Attendance: 5,000; Referee: Riccardo Pinzani

19 December 2017	Napoli (1)	1–0	Udinese (1)	Naples
21:00 CET (UTC+1)	Insigne 71'	Report		Stadium: Stadio San Paolo; Attendance: 15,096; Referee: Fabrizio Pasqua

20 December 2017	Atalanta (1)	2–1	Sassuolo (1)	Bergamo
15:00 CET (UTC+1)	Cornelius 16'; Toloi 33'	Report	Toloi 74' (o.g.)	Stadium: Stadio Atleti Azzurri d'Italia; Attendance: 3,867; Referee: Davide Ghersini

20 December 2017	Roma (1)	1–2	Torino (1)	Rome
17:30 CET (UTC+1)	Schick 85'	Report	De Silvestri 39'; Edera 73'	Stadium: Stadio Olimpico; Attendance: 27,206; Referee: Gianpaolo Calvarese

20 December 2017	Juventus (1)	2–0	Genoa (1)	Turin
20:45 CET (UTC+1)	Dybala 42'; Higuaín 76'	Report		Stadium: Allianz Stadium; Attendance: 39,969; Referee: Fabio Maresca

==== Quarter-finals ====
Quarter-final matches were played from 26 December 2017 to 3 January 2018.

26 December 2017	Lazio	1–0	Fiorentina	Rome
21:00 CET (UTC+1)	Lulić 6'	Report		Stadium: Stadio Olimpico; Attendance: 25,000; Referee: Antonio Damato

27 December 2017	Milan	1–0 (a.e.t.)	Internazionale	Milan
20:45 CET (UTC+1)	Cutrone 104'	Report		Stadium: San Siro; Attendance: 48,721; Referee: Marco Guida

2 January 2018	Napoli	1–2	Atalanta	Naples
20:45 CET (UTC+1)	Mertens 84'	Report	Castagne 50'; Gómez 81'	Stadium: Stadio San Paolo; Attendance: 27,174; Referee: Piero Giacomelli

3 January 2018	Juventus	2–0	Torino	Turin
20:45 CET (UTC+1)	Douglas Costa 15'; Mandžukić 67'	Report		Stadium: Allianz Stadium; Attendance: 37,763; Referee: Daniele Doveri

==== Semi-finals ====
For the semi-finals, the first legs were played on 30 and 31 January and the second on 28 February 2018.

===== First leg =====
30 January 2018	Atalanta	0–1	Juventus	Bergamo
20:45 CET (UTC+1)		Report	Higuaín 3'	Stadium: Stadio Atleti Azzurri d'Italia; Attendance: 16,406; Referee: Paolo Valeri

31 January 2018	Milan	0–0	Lazio	Milan
20:45 CET (UTC+1)		Report		Stadium: San Siro; Attendance: 17,724; Referee: Marco Guida

===== Second leg =====
28 February 2018	Juventus	1–0 (2–0 agg.)	Atalanta	Turin
17:30 CET (UTC+1)	Pjanić 75' (pen.)	Report		Stadium: Allianz Stadium; Attendance: 38,417; Referee: Michael Fabbri

28 February 2018	Lazio	0–0 (a.e.t.) (0–0 agg.) (4–5 p)	Milan	Rome
20:45 CET (UTC+1)		Report		Stadium: Stadio Olimpico; Attendance: 40,000; Referee: Gianluca Rocchi
	Penalties
	Immobile (penalty scored); Milinković-Savić (penalty missed); Lucas (penalty missed); Parolo (penalty scored); Felipe Anderson (penalty scored); Lulić (penalty scored); Luiz Felipe (penalty missed)		(penalty missed) Rodríguez; (penalty missed) Montolivo; (penalty scored) Bonaventura; (penalty scored) Borini; (penalty scored) Bonucci; (penalty scored) Çalhanoğlu; (penalty scored) Romagnoli

== Final ==
9 May 2018
21:00 CEST (UTC+2)

Juventus	4–0	Milan
Benatia 56', 64'; Douglas Costa 61'; Kalinić 76' (o.g.)	Report

Stadio Olimpico, Rome
Attendance: 64,983
Referee: Antonio Damato

== Top goalscorers ==
Rank	Player	Club	Goals
1	(Italy) Alberto Cerri	Perugia	4
1	(Italy) Matteo Di Piazza	Lecce	4
1	(Argentina) Maxi López	Udinese	4
4	(Italy) Andrea Belotti	Torino	3
4	(Italy) Salvatore Burrai	Pordenone	3
4	(Italy) Ferdinando Del Sole	Pescara	3
4	(Italy) Umberto Eusepi	Pisa	3
4	(Italy) Andrea Favilli	Ascoli	3
4	(Poland) Dawid Kownacki	Sampdoria	3
4	(Italy) Jacopo Murano	Trapani	3
4	(North Macedonia) Aleksandar Trajkovski	Palermo	3

== See also ==
- 2017–18 Serie A
