= 2018–19 Serie C =

Serie C
- Season: 2018–19
- Dates: 16 September 2018 – 15 June 2019
- Champions: Virtus Entella; Pordenone; Juve Stabia
- Promoted: Virtus Entella; Pisa; Pordenone; Juve Stabia; Trapani
- Relegated: Arzachena (bankruptcy); Albissola (bankruptcy); Cuneo (bankruptcy); Lucchese (bankruptcy); Pro Piacenza (bankruptcy); Siracusa (bankruptcy); Matera (bankruptcy)
- Matches: 1,128
- Goals: 2,477 (2.2 per match)
- Top goalscorer: Pablo Granoche (20 goals)
- Biggest home win: Vibonese 5–0 Virtus Francavilla (3 November 2018); Catania 5–0 Cavese (23 December 2018); Imolese 5–0 Giana Erminio (19 January 2019)
- Biggest away win: Matera 0–6 Reggina (26 December 2018)
- Highest scoring: Catanzaro 6–3 Trapani (5 May 2019)
- Longest winning run: 7 games FeralpiSalò
- Longest unbeaten run: 28 games Juve Stabia
- Longest winless run: 18 games Paganese; Ternana
- Longest losing run: 8 games Arzachena
- Highest attendance: 19,446; Triestina 1–3 Pisa (9 June 2019, Play-off final)
- Lowest attendance: 23; Rende 0–1 Trapani (20 April 2019)
- Total attendance: 2,065,818
- Average attendance: 1,979

The 2018–19 Serie C was the 60th season of the Serie C, the third tier of the Italian football league system, organized by the Lega Pro.

== Teams ==
The league originally featured 60 teams. However, it saw the bankruptcy and subsequent withdrawal of Andria, Mestre, Reggiana and Vicenza.

To fill the vacancies in Serie B, Novara, Catania and Siena became the repechage candidates from Serie C, to the objection of Pro Vercelli and Ternana. However, on 10 August Lega B announced that a 19-team calendar would be commissioned for the 2018–19 and no repechage would take place.

The first team of Bassano Virtus was relocated to Vicenza as L.R. Vicenza Virtus. While its owner, had also acquired some assets from the liquidators of Vicenza.

On 3 August 2018, it was officially announced by the Italian Football Federation (FIGC) that Juventus Under 23 would take part in Serie C, making it the first "B Team" in Italy to do so since 1934. Also, Cavese and Imolese were admitted from Serie D to fill the vacancies created.

Due to several issues regarding vacancies and trials at both Serie B and Serie C level, the Serie C league committee delayed the season kickoff day to September, also hinting at the possibility of an indefinite delay because of the unclear situation. The season eventually kicked off on Saturday 15 September, but saw all games of Novara, Pro Vercelli, Ternana, Siena and Catania delayed indefinitely due to their judicial requests to be admitted to Serie B, as well as Viterbese, after the club threatened not to participate in Serie C due to their opposition to being admitted to the Southern group. Virtus Entella's second game was also delayed after the club was accepted on appeal for being readmitted to Serie B by the Regional Administrative Court of Lazio (Italian: Tribunale Amministrativo Regionale del Lazio, TAR Lazio).

On 14 February 2019, Matera were excluded from Serie C for missing four consecutive matches which was followed by the exclusion of Pro Piacenza on 18 February 2019 after missing several games and presenting a makeshift team composed of teenagers and a physiotherapist in their final game, where they were beaten 20-0 by Cuneo.

=== Promotion and relegation rule changes ===
On 30 January 2019, it was announced that five teams rather than the usual four would be promoted to Serie B for the 2019-20 season, after FIGC decided to incorporate an extra club in Serie B to bring the league up to 20 teams. The decision also meant that only seven clubs would be relegated to Serie D rather than the original eight.

Due to the exclusions of Pro Piacenza and Matera from the league, the football league committee, in accordance with the Italian Football Federation, agreed on 2 April 2019 to a change in the relegation rules, by decreasing the number of relegations to five as follows:

- Group A, which originally featured 20 teams, later reduced to 19 following the exclusion of Pro Piacenza, will have no direct relegation unless there are eight or more points between the last and second-last placed team at the conclusion of the regular season. In the case of less than eight points between the two bottom teams, a two-legged relegation playoff will be played.
- Group B (20 teams), as the only one that was not affected by league exclusion, will have a direct relegation for the bottom placed team in the regular season, plus a two-legged relegation playoff between the 18th and 19th placed team.
- Group C (19 teams, later reduced to 18 teams due to Matera's exclusion) will feature the same relegation system as in Group A.
- The two relegation playoff winners from Group A and Group C (or the respective second-last placed teams in the regular season, in case of no relegation playoff being held) will subsequently take part in another relegation playoff to determine the fifth team relegated to Serie D in 2019–20.

=== Relegated from Serie B ===
- Novara
- Pro Vercelli
- Ternana
- Virtus Entella

=== Promoted from Serie D ===
- Gozzano (Girone A winners)
- Pro Patria (Girone B winners and 2017–18 Serie D title holders)
- Virtus Verona (Girone C winners)
- Rimini (Girone D winners)
- Albissola (Girone E winners)
- Vis Pesaro (Girone F winners)
- Rieti (Girone G winners)
- Potenza (Girone H winners)
- Vibonese (Girone I winners)
- Imolese (Girone D runner-up and playoff winner)
- Cavese (Girone H runner-up and playoff winner)

=== Repechage ===
- Juventus U23 (newly founded B team)

=== Stadia and locations ===
==== Group A (North & Central West) ====
7 teams from Tuscany, 6 teams from Piedmont, 2 teams from Emilia-Romagna, 2 teams from Sardinia, 2 teams from Liguria and 1 team from Lombardy.

Location of teams in Serie C (Group A) 2018–19
Location of teams in 2018–19 Serie C (Group A) (Tuscany)

Club	City	Stadium	Capacity
Albissola	Albissola Marina; Albisola Superiore	Comunale (Chiavari)	5,535
Alessandria	Alessandria	Giuseppe Moccagatta	5,827
Arezzo	Arezzo	Città di Arezzo	13,128
Arzachena	Arzachena	Biagio Pirina	3,100
Carrarese	Carrara	Dei Marmi	9,500
Cuneo	Cuneo	Fratelli Paschiero	4,000
Gozzano	Gozzano	Alfredo d'Albertas / Silvio Piola (Vercelli)	400 / 5,500
Juventus U23	Turin	Giuseppe Moccagatta (Alessandria)	5,827
Lucchese	Lucca	Porta Elisa	7,386
Novara	Novara	Silvio Piola (Novara)	17,875
Olbia	Olbia	Bruno Nespoli	3,200
Piacenza	Piacenza	Leonardo Garilli	21,668
Pisa	Pisa	Arena Garibaldi – Romeo Anconetani	25,000
Pistoiese	Pistoia	Marcello Melani	13,195
Pontedera	Pontedera	Ettore Mannucci	5,000
Pro Patria	Busto Arsizio	Carlo Speroni	4,627
Pro Piacenza	Piacenza	Leonardo Garilli	21,668
Pro Vercelli	Vercelli	Silvio Piola (Vercelli)	5,500
Siena	Siena	Montepaschi Arena	15,373
Virtus Entella	Chiavari	Comunale	5,535

==== Group B (North & Central East) ====
5 teams from Lombardy, 4 teams from Marche, 3 teams from Emilia-Romagna, 2 teams from Friuli-Venezia Giulia, 2 teams from Umbria, 2 teams from Veneto, 1 team from Abruzzo and 1 team from Trentino-Alto Adige.

Location of teams in Serie C (Group B) 2018–19
Location of teams in 2018–19 Serie C (Group B) (Lombardy)
Location of teams in 2018–19 Serie C (Group B) (Marche)

Club	City	Stadium	Capacity
AlbinoLeffe	Albino and Leffe	Atleti Azzurri d'Italia (Bergamo)	21,300
Fano	Fano	Raffaele Mancini	8,800
FeralpiSalò	Salò	Lino Turina	2,500
Fermana	Fermo	Bruno Recchioni	9,500
Giana Erminio	Gorgonzola	Città di Gorgonzola	3,766
Gubbio	Gubbio	Pietro Barbetti	5,300
Imolese	Imola	Romeo Galli	4,000
L.R. Vicenza	Vicenza	Romeo Menti	12,000
Monza	Monza	Brianteo	18,568
Pordenone	Pordenone	Ottavio Bottecchia	3,000
Ravenna	Ravenna	Bruno Benelli	12,020
Renate	Renate	Città di Meda (Meda)	3,000
Rimini	Rimini	Romeo Neri	7,442
Sambenedettese	San Benedetto del Tronto	Riviera delle Palme	14,995
Südtirol	Bolzano/Bozen	Druso	3,500
Teramo	Teramo	Gaetano Bonolis	7,498
Ternana	Terni	Libero Liberati	17,460
Triestina	Trieste	Nereo Rocco	32,454
Virtus Verona	Verona	Gavagnin Nocini	1,200
Vis Pesaro	Pesaro	Tonino Benelli	4,898

==== Group C (South) ====
4 teams from Calabria, 4 teams from Campania, 4 teams from Sicily, 3 teams from Apulia, 2 teams from Basilicata, 2 teams from Lazio.

Location of teams in Serie C (Group C) 2018–19
Location of teams in 2018–19 Serie C (Group C) (Campania)

Club	City	Stadium	Capacity
Bisceglie	Bisceglie	Gustavo Ventura	5,000
Casertana	Caserta	Alberto Pinto	12,000
Catania	Catania	Angelo Massimino	20,266
Catanzaro	Catanzaro	Nicola Ceravolo	14,650
Cavese	Cava de' Tirreni	Simonetta Lamberti	5,200
Juve Stabia	Castellammare di Stabia	Romeo Menti	7,642
Matera	Matera	Stadio XXI Settembre-Franco Salerno	8,500
Monopoli	Monopoli	Vito Simone Veneziani	6,880
Paganese	Pagani	Marcello Torre	5,900
Potenza	Potenza	Alfredo Viviani	6,000
Reggina	Reggio Calabria	Oreste Granillo	27,454
Rende	Rende	Marco Lorenzon	5,000
Rieti	Rieti	Manlio Scopigno	10,163
Sicula Leonzio	Lentini	Angelino Nobile	2,500
Siracusa	Siracusa	Nicola De Simone	6,870
Trapani	Trapani	Polisportivo Provinciale (Erice)	7,000
Vibonese	Vibo Valentia	Luigi Razza	6,500
Virtus Francavilla	Francavilla Fontana	Giovanni Paolo II	5,000
Viterbese Castrense	Viterbo	Enrico Rocchi	5,460

== League tables ==
=== Group A (North & Central West) ===
Pos	Team	Pld	W	D	L	GF	GA	GD	Pts	Qualification
1	Virtus Entella (P)	37	22	9	6	58	26	+32	75	Promotion to Serie B
2	Piacenza	37	22	8	7	56	33	+23	74	Qualification to the promotion play-offs
3	Pisa (O, P)	37	19	12	6	47	28	+19	69	Qualification to the promotion play-offs
4	Arezzo	37	16	16	5	49	32	+17	64 (Note: Arezzo is ahead of Pro Vercelli on head-to-head goal difference: Arezzo–Pro Vercelli 3–1, Pro Vercelli–Arezzo 1–0)	Qualification to the promotion play-offs
5	Pro Vercelli	37	18	10	9	45	29	+16	64	Qualification to the promotion play-offs
6	Robur Siena	37	16	15	6	57	40	+17	63	Qualification to the promotion play-offs
7	Carrarese	37	19	5	13	65	46	+19	62	Qualification to the promotion play-offs
8	Pro Patria	37	16	9	12	43	36	+7	57	Qualification to the promotion play-offs
9	Novara	37	11	17	9	44	36	+8	50	Qualification to the promotion play-offs
10	Alessandria	37	9	18	10	35	40	−5	45 (Note: Alessandria is ahead of Pontedera on head-to-head points: Alessandria–Pontedera 1–1, Pontedera–Alessandria 1–2)	Qualification to the promotion play-offs
11	Pontedera	37	10	15	12	33	39	−6	45	
12	Juventus U23	37	12	6	19	41	48	−7	42	
13	Olbia	37	9	11	17	40	49	−9	38	
14	Arzachena (Note: 1 point deduction due to financial irregularities.) (D, R)	37	12	2	23	28	54	−26	37	Club dissolved
15	Pistoiese	37	9	8	20	36	47	−11	35	
16	Gozzano	37	6	15	16	35	44	−9	33	
17	Albissola (D, R)	37	6	10	21	33	59	−26	28	Club dissolved
18	Cuneo (Note: 23 point deduction due to financial irregularities.) (D, R)	37	11	14	12	29	36	−7	24	Club dissolved
19	Lucchese (Note: 25 point deduction due to financial irregularities.) (O, D, R)	37	9	18	10	45	40	+5	20	Club dissolved
20	Pro Piacenza (Note: 16 point deduction due to financial irregularities initially, then expulsion from the championship.) (D, R)	19	0	0	19	0	57	−57	0	Excluded from league

Source: Lega Pro
Rules for classification: 1) Points; 2) Head-to-head points; 3) Head-to-head goal difference; 4) Goal difference; 5) Goals scored; 6) Draw.
(D) Disqualified; (O) Play-off winners; (P) Promoted; (R) Relegated

=== Group B (North & Central East) ===
Pos	Team	Pld	W	D	L	GF	GA	GD	Pts	Qualification
1	Pordenone (C, P)	38	19	16	3	56	32	+24	73	Promotion to Serie B
2	Triestina (Note: Triestina were deducted 1 point for financial irregularities.)	38	19	11	8	60	33	+27	67	Qualification to the promotion play-offs
3	Imolese	38	15	17	6	51	33	+18	62 (Note: Imolese is ahead of Feralpisalò on head-to-head points: Imolese–Feralpisalò 3–1, Feralpisalò–Imolese 0–1)	Qualification to the promotion play-offs
4	Feralpisalò	38	17	11	10	50	41	+9	62	Qualification to the promotion play-offs
5	Monza	38	16	12	10	45	35	+10	60	Qualification to the promotion play-offs
6	Südtirol	38	13	16	9	45	30	+15	55 (Note: Südtirol is ahead of Ravenna on head-to-head points: Südtirol–Ravenna 1–1, Ravenna–Südtirol 0–1)	Qualification to the promotion play-offs
7	Ravenna	38	14	13	11	39	38	+1	55	Qualification to the promotion play-offs
8	L.R. Vicenza	38	11	18	9	43	38	+5	51	Qualification to the promotion play-offs
9	Sambenedettese	38	11	17	10	40	40	0	50	Qualification to the promotion play-offs
10	Fermana	38	12	11	15	21	35	−14	47	Qualification to the promotion play-offs
11	Ternana	38	9	17	12	39	40	−1	44 (Note: Ternana is ahead of Gubbio on head-to-head points: Ternana–Gubbio 3–0, Gubbio–Ternana 1–1)	
12	Gubbio	38	9	17	12	35	45	−10	44	
13	Teramo	38	10	13	15	36	46	−10	43 (Note: Teramo is ahead of Albinoleffe on head-to-head points: Teramo–Albinoleffe 2–2, Albinoleffe–Teramo 1–2)	
14	Albinoleffe	38	9	16	13	31	35	−4	43	
15	Vis Pesaro	38	9	15	14	29	31	−2	42 (Note: Vis Pesaro is ahead of Giana Erminio on overall goal difference)	
16	Giana Erminio	38	8	18	12	42	50	−8	42	
17	Renate	38	8	15	15	23	33	−10	39 (Note: Renate is ahead of Rimini on head-to-head points: Renate–Rimini 1–0, Rimini–Renate 0–0)	
18	Rimini (O)	38	8	15	15	28	44	−16	39	Qualification to the relegation play-outs
19	Virtus Verona	38	10	8	20	36	50	−14	38 (Note: Virtus Verona is ahead of Fano on head-to-head points: Virtus Verona–Fano 1–0, Fano–Virtus Verona 1–1)	Readmitted
20	Fano	38	8	14	16	18	32	−14	38	Readmitted

Source: Lega Pro
Rules for classification: 1) Points; 2) Head-to-head points; 3) Head-to-head goal difference; 4) Goal difference; 5) Goals scored; 6) Draw.
(C) Champions; (O) Play-off winners; (P) Promoted

=== Group C (South) ===
Pos	Team	Pld	W	D	L	GF	GA	GD	Pts	Qualification
1	Juve Stabia (Note: 1 point deduction due to financial irregularities.) (P)	36	22	12	2	63	18	+45	77	Promotion to Serie B
2	Trapani (Note: 1 point deduction due to financial irregularities.) (O, P)	36	22	8	6	60	34	+26	73	Qualification to the promotion play-offs
3	Catanzaro	36	20	7	9	65	32	+33	67	Qualification to the promotion play-offs
4	Catania	36	19	8	9	48	29	+19	65	Qualification to the promotion play-offs
5	Potenza	36	14	15	7	45	32	+13	57	Qualification to the promotion play-offs
6	Virtus Francavilla	36	16	7	13	42	39	+3	55	Qualification to the promotion play-offs
7	Reggina (Note: 4 point deduction due to financial irregularities.)	36	16	8	12	45	33	+12	52	Qualification to the promotion play-offs
8	Monopoli (Note: 2 point deduction due to financial irregularities.)	36	13	14	9	41	31	+10	51 (Note: Monopoli is ahead of Casertana on overall goal difference)	Qualification to the promotion play-offs
9	Casertana	36	13	12	11	46	38	+8	51	Qualification to the promotion play-offs
10	Rende (Note: 1 point deduction due to financial irregularities.)	36	14	6	16	46	45	+1	47 (Note: Rende is ahead of Cavese on overall goal difference)	Qualification to the promotion play-offs
11	Cavese	36	11	14	11	49	50	−1	47	
12	Viterbese Castrense	36	12	9	15	39	44	−5	45	Qualification to the promotion play-offs (Note: Viterbese Castrense qualified as winners of the 2018–19 Coppa Italia Serie C.)
13	Sicula Leonzio	36	11	9	16	32	42	−10	42 (Note: Sicula Leonzio is ahead of Vibonese on head-to-head goal difference: Sicula Leonzio–Vibonese 2–0, Vibonese–Sicula Leonzio 1–0)	
14	Vibonese	36	10	12	14	33	37	−4	42	
15	Rieti (Note: 4 point deduction due to financial irregularities.)	36	12	7	17	33	43	−10	39	
16	Siracusa (Note: 6 point deduction due to financial irregularities. Club dissolved at the end of season. A phoenix club was admitted to Promozione Sicily) (D, R)	36	12	6	18	34	44	−10	36	Relegation to Promozione Sicily
17	Bisceglie (Note: 3 point deduction due to financial irregularities.)	36	7	11	18	22	41	−19	29	Readmitted
18	Paganese	36	4	11	21	36	72	−36	23	Readmitted
19	Matera (Note: 34 point deduction due to financial irregularities initially, then expulsion from the championship.) (D, R)	36	4	4	28	16	92	−76	−18	Excluded from league

Source: Lega Pro
Rules for classification: 1) Points; 2) Head-to-head points; 3) Head-to-head goal difference; 4) Goal difference; 5) Goals scored; 6) Draw.
(D) Disqualified; (O) Play-off winners; (P) Promoted; (R) Relegated

== Promotion play-offs ==
=== First Round ===
If tied, higher-placed team advances.

Team 1	Score	Team 2
Pro Vercelli	3–1	Alessandria
Robur Siena	0–1	Novara
Carrarese	2–0	Pro Patria
Monza	2–0	Fermana
Südtirol	1–0	Sambenedettese
Ravenna	1–1	L.R. Vicenza
Potenza	0–0	Rende
Virtus Francavilla	1–0	Casertana
Reggina	1–1	Monopoli

=== Second Round ===
If tied, higher-placed team advances.

Team 1	Score	Team 2
Arezzo	2–2	Novara
Pro Vercelli	1–2	Carrarese
FeralpiSalò	0–0	Ravenna
Monza	3–3	Südtirol
Catania	4–1	Reggina
Potenza	3–1	Virtus Francavilla

=== Quarter-finals ===
If tied on aggregate, higher-placed team advances.

Team 1	Agg.	Team 2	1st leg	2nd leg
FeralpiSalò	3–2	Catanzaro	1–0	2–2
Potenza	2–2	Catania	1–1	1–1
Arezzo	5–0	Viterbese	3–0	2–0
Carrarese	3–4	Pisa	2–2	1–2
Monza	4–4	Imolese	1–3	3–1

=== Semi-finals ===
If tied on aggregate, higher-placed team advances.

Team 1	Agg.	Team 2	1st leg	2nd leg
Arezzo	2–4	Pisa	2–3	0–1
Catania	3–3	Trapani	2–2	1–1
FeralpiSalò	1–3	Triestina	1–1	0–2
Imolese	2–3	Piacenza	0–2	2–1

=== Finals ===
If tied on aggregate, the winner is decided by extra-time and penalty shootout.

Team 1	Agg.	Team 2	1st leg	2nd leg
Pisa	5–3 (a.e.t.)	Triestina	2–2	3–1 (a.e.t.)
Piacenza	0–2	Trapani	0–0	0-2

== Relegation play-outs ==
=== First Round ===
Higher-placed team plays at home for second leg. If tied on aggregate, lower-placed team is relegated.

Team 1	Agg.	Team 2	1st leg	2nd leg
Lucchese	3–0	Cuneo	2–0	1–0
Virtus Verona	1–2	Rimini	1–0	0–2
Paganese	5–5	Bisceglie	2–1	3–4

=== Final ===
If tied on aggregate, extra time and eventually penalty shoot-out are played. Losers are relegated.

Team 1	Agg.	Team 2	1st leg	2nd leg
Lucchese	1–1 (a.e.t.) (3-2 pen.)	Bisceglie	1–0	0–1

== Top goalscorers ==
Rank	Player	Club	Goals
1	(Uruguay) Pablo Granoche^{3}	Triestina	20
2	(Italy) Francesco Tavano^{1}	Carrarese	18
3	(Italy) Matteo Brunori Sandri^{4}	Arezzo	17
3	(Italy) Luigi Castaldo	Casertana	17
5	(Italy) Leonardo Candellone	Pordenone	15
5	(Italy) Ettore Gliozzi	Robur Siena	15
5	(Italy) Eric Lanini^{1}	Imolese	15
5	(Italy) Fabio Perna	Giana Erminio	15
9	(Italy) Giuseppe Caccavallo^{1}	Carrarese	14
9	(Italy) Eugenio D'Ursi	Catanzaro	14
9	(Italy) Manuel Fischnaller^{1}	Catanzaro	14
9	(Italy) Riccardo Martignago	Albissola	14

Note

^{1}Player scored 1 goal in the play-offs.
^{3}Player scored 3 goals in the play-offs.
^{4}Player scored 4 goals in the play-offs.
