= 2017–18 Serie C =

Serie C
- Season: 2017–18
- Dates: 26 August 2017 – 16 June 2018
- Champions: Livorno; Padova; Lecce
- Promoted: Livorno; Padova; Lecce; Cosenza (via play-offs)
- Relegated: Gavorrano; Prato; Reggiana (bankruptcy); Mestre (bankruptcy); Santarcangelo; Vicenza (bankruptcy); Modena (excluded); Fidelis Andria (bankruptcy); Fondi; Akragas
- Matches: 1,034
- Goals: 2,354 (2.28 per match)
- Top goalscorer: Simone Guerra (21 goals)
- Biggest home win: Juve Stabia 7–0 Akragas (11 March 2018)
- Biggest away win: Ravenna 1–5 Triestina (10 September 2017); Cuneo 0–4 Livorno (15 October 2017); Akragas 1–5 Fidelis Andria (11 November 2017); Catanzaro 0–4 Catania (31 March 2018); Reggiana 0–4 Mestre (11 April 2018); Mestre 0–4 Santarcangelo (29 April 2018); Virtus Francavilla 1–5 Cosenza (29 April 2018); Lucchese 0–4 Pro Piacenza (5 May 2018)
- Highest scoring: Fondi 4–5 Paganese (8 April 2018)
- Longest winning run: Alessandria; Catania (6 matches)
- Longest unbeaten run: Lecce (22 matches)
- Longest winless run: Akragas (19 matches)
- Longest losing run: Akragas; Gavorrano (7 matches)
- Highest attendance: 18,711; Catania 1–2 Trapani (23 April 2018)
- Lowest attendance: 30; Akragas 0–3 Siracusa (30 September 2017)
- Total attendance: 2,338,073
- Average attendance: 2,261

The 2017–18 Serie C was the 59th season of the Serie C, the third tier of the Italian football league system, organized by the Lega Pro (which restored the classic name of the championship).

Livorno, Padova and Lecce won their respective groups and were promoted directly to Serie B. Cosenza secured the fourth promotion place by defeating Siena 3-1 in the play-off final in Pescara, returning to Serie B after 15 years.

== Teams ==
A total of 60 teams were expected to contest the league, including 4 sides relegated from the 2016–17 Serie B season, 47 sides who played the 2016–17 Lega Pro season, and 9 sides promoted from the 2016–17 Serie D.

On 24 May 2017 Latina, just relegated to Lega Pro from Serie B, was declared insolvent and excluded from the Italian football league system, thus creating a first vacancy in the league composition.

Como did not obtain the necessary federal licence before 30 June 2017, the latest possible date to enrol in the 2017–18 league, and were subsequently excluded creating a second vacancy.

On 6 July, FIGC's Co.Vi.So.C announced that Akragas, Maceratese, Mantova and Messina did not submit a copy of their bank guarantees. Maceratese, Mantova and Messina chose not to file appeals and were excluded from the division, however, Akragas, Arezzo, Fidelis Andria, Juve Stabia and Modena all successfully appealed the initial decision and on 20 July it was confirmed that they would all remain in the division.

On 4 August, Triestina was declared the only eligible club to compete in Serie C as a replacement for the excluded ones. This brought the number of clubs that will compete in the 2017–18 Serie C down from 60 to 56.

On 11 August Rende was also declared eligible to compete in Serie C, so the final number of teams was 57, divided into three groups of 19 teams each.

On 6 November, Modena was officially excluded from the league and dissolved after failing to attend four consecutive matches due to financial irregularities. All matches involving Modena were annulled and the Group B standings were recalculated.

=== Format changes ===
Because only 57 clubs were admitted to the league, the competition was divided into three groups of 19 teams. For the 2017-18 season, the number of regulations to Serie D was temporarily reduced from nine to six. The promotion play-offs involved 28 teams: the clubs finishing between second and tenth place in each group, together with the winner of the Coppa Italia Serie C.

=== Relegated from Serie B ===
- Trapani
- Vicenza
- Pisa

=== Promoted from Serie D ===
- Cuneo (Girone A winners)
- Monza (Girone B winners)
- Mestre (Girone C winners)
- Ravenna (Girone D winners)
- Gavorrano (Girone E winners)
- Fermana (Girone F winners)
- Arzachena (Girone G winners)
- Bisceglie (Girone H winners)
- Leonzio (Girone I winners)
- Triestina (Girone C runner-up and playoff winner)

=== Stadia and locations ===
==== Group A (North & Central West) ====
10 teams from Tuscany, 2 teams from Lombardy, 2 teams from Piedmont, 2 teams from Sardinia, 2 teams from Emilia-Romagna and 1 team from Lazio.

Location of teams in Serie C (Group A) 2017–18
Location of teams in 2017–18 Serie C (Group A) (Tuscany)

Club	City	Stadium	Capacity
Alessandria	Alessandria	Giuseppe Moccagatta	5,827
Arezzo	Arezzo	Città di Arezzo	13,128
Arzachena	Arzachena	Biagio Pirina	3,100
Carrarese	Carrara	Dei Marmi	9,500
Cuneo	Cuneo	Fratelli Paschiero	4,000
Gavorrano	Gavorrano	Romeo Malservisi	2,000
Giana Erminio	Gorgonzola	Città di Gorgonzola	3,766
Livorno	Livorno	Armando Picchi	19,238
Lucchese	Lucca	Porta Elisa	7,386
Monza	Monza	Brianteo	18,568
Olbia	Olbia	Bruno Nespoli	3,200
Piacenza	Piacenza	Leonardo Garilli	21,668
Pisa	Pisa	Arena Garibaldi – Romeo Anconetani	25,000
Pistoiese	Pistoia	Marcello Melani	13,195
Pontedera	Pontedera	Ettore Mannucci	5,000
Prato	Prato	Lungobisenzio	6,750
Pro Piacenza	Piacenza	Leonardo Garilli	21,668
Siena	Siena	Montepaschi Arena	15,373
Viterbese	Viterbo	Enrico Rocchi	5,500

==== Group B (North & Central East) ====
4 teams from Emilia-Romagna, 4 teams from Veneto, 3 teams from Marche, 3 teams from Lombardy, 2 teams from Friuli-Venezia Giulia, 1 team from Abruzzo, 1 team from Trentino-Alto Adige and 1 team from Umbria.

Location of teams in Serie C (Group B) 2017–18
Location of teams in Serie C (Group B) 2017–18 (Veneto)

Club	City	Stadium	Capacity
AlbinoLeffe	Albino and Leffe	Atleti Azzurri d'Italia (Bergamo)	21,300
Bassano Virtus	Bassano del Grappa	Rino Mercante	2,952
Fano	Fano	Raffaele Mancini	8,800
FeralpiSalò	Salò	Lino Turina	2,500
Fermana	Fermo	Bruno Recchioni	9,500
Gubbio	Gubbio	Pietro Barbetti	5,300
Mestre	Venice	Francesco Baracca	2,000
Modena	Modena	Alberto Braglia	21,151
Padova	Padua	Euganeo	19,740
Pordenone	Pordenone	Ottavio Bottecchia	3,000
Ravenna	Ravenna	Bruno Benelli	12,020
Reggiana	Reggio Emilia	Città del Tricolore	20,084
Renate	Renate	Città di Meda (Meda)	3,000
Sambenedettese	San Benedetto del Tronto	Riviera delle Palme	14,995
Santarcangelo	Santarcangelo di Romagna	Valentino Mazzola	3,000
Südtirol	Bolzano/Bozen	Druso	3,500
Teramo	Teramo	Gaetano Bonolis	7,498
Triestina	Trieste	Nereo Rocco	32,454
Vicenza	Vicenza	Romeo Menti	12,000

==== Group C (South) ====
5 teams from Sicily, 5 teams from Apulia, 4 teams from Calabria, 3 teams from Campania, 1 team from Lazio and 1 team from Basilicata.

Location of teams in Serie C (Group C) 2017–18
Location of teams in 2017–18 Serie C (Group C) (South)

Club	City	Stadium	Capacity
Akragas	Agrigento	Esseneto	15,000
Bisceglie	Bisceglie	Gustavo Ventura	5,000
Casertana	Caserta	Alberto Pinto	12,000
Catania	Catania	Angelo Massimino	20,266
Catanzaro	Catanzaro	Nicola Ceravolo	14,650
Cosenza	Cosenza	San Vito	24,479
Fidelis Andria	Andria	Degli Ulivi	9,140
Fondi	Fondi	Domenico Purificato	2,500
Juve Stabia	Castellammare di Stabia	Romeo Menti	7,642
Lecce	Lecce	Via del Mare	33,876
Matera	Matera	Stadio XXI Settembre-Franco Salerno	8,500
Monopoli	Monopoli	Vito Simone Veneziani	6,880
Paganese	Pagani	Marcello Torre	5,900
Reggina	Reggio Calabria	Oreste Granillo	27,454
Rende	Rende	Marco Lorenzon	5,000
Sicula Leonzio	Lentini	Angelino Nobile	2,500
Siracusa	Siracusa	Nicola De Simone	6,870
Trapani	Trapani	Polisportivo Provinciale	7,000
Virtus Francavilla	Francavilla Fontana	Giovanni Paolo II	5,000

== League tables ==
=== Group A (North & Central West) ===
Pos	Team	Pld	W	D	L	GF	GA	GD	Pts	Promotion, qualification or relegation
1	Livorno (C, P)	36	20	8	8	64	38	+26	68	Promotion to Serie B
2	Siena	36	20	7	9	41	30	+11	67	Qualification to the promotion play-offs
3	Pisa	36	16	13	7	44	30	+14	61	Qualification to the promotion play-offs
4	Monza	36	16	10	10	40	26	+14	58 (Note: Monza is ahead of Viterbese on head-to-head points: Monza 0–0 Viterbese, Viterbese 0–1 Monza.)	Qualification to the promotion play-offs
5	Viterbese	36	16	10	10	46	35	+11	58	Qualification to the promotion play-offs
6	Alessandria (Note: Alessandria qualified to the third round of promotion play-offs winning the 2017-2018 Coppa Italia Serie C.)	36	14	14	8	54	37	+17	56	Qualification to the promotion play-offs
7	Carrarese	36	15	10	11	57	47	+10	55	Qualification to the promotion play-offs
8	Piacenza (Note: Piacenza was deducted 2 points for financial reasons.)	36	14	10	12	43	41	+2	50	Qualification to the promotion play-offs
9	Giana Erminio	36	11	13	12	59	56	+3	46 (Note: Head-to-head points: Giana Erminio 8 pts, Pistoiese 5 pts, Pontedera 2 pts.)	Qualification to the promotion play-offs
10	Pistoiese	36	10	16	10	44	47	−3	46	Qualification to the promotion play-offs
11	Pontedera	36	12	10	14	38	49	−11	46	Qualification to the promotion play-offs
12	Lucchese	36	10	14	12	35	42	−7	44	
13	Olbia	36	12	7	17	39	52	−13	43	
14	Pro Piacenza	36	11	8	17	38	43	−5	41	
15	Arzachena	36	10	9	17	49	53	−4	39	
16	Arezzo (Note: Arezzo was deducted 15 points for financial reasons but reduced to -13 points after appeal)	36	14	10	12	39	35	+4	39	
17	Gavorrano (Note: Gavorrano was deducted 2 points for financial reasons.) (R)	36	9	9	18	35	51	−16	34	Qualification to the relegation play-outs
18	Cuneo (O)	36	7	11	18	24	47	−23	32	Qualification to the relegation play-outs
19	Prato (R)	36	5	11	20	32	62	−30	26	Relegation to Serie D

Source: Livescore, lega-pro.com
(C) Champions; (O) Play-off winners; (P) Promoted; (R) Relegated

=== Group B (North & Central East) ===
Pos	Team	Pld	W	D	L	GF	GA	GD	Pts	Promotion, qualification or relegation
1	Padova (C, P)	34	17	12	5	44	27	+17	63	Promotion to Serie B
2	Südtirol	34	15	10	9	37	28	+9	55	Qualification to the promotion play-offs
3	Sambenedettese	34	14	11	9	38	31	+7	53 (Note: Sambenedettese is ahead of Reggiana on head-to-head points: Sambenedettese 0–0 Reggiana, Reggiana 0–2 Sambenedettese.)	Qualification to the promotion play-offs
4	Reggiana (Note: After the season, Reggiana did not to register the team for the 2018–19 Serie C championship, after an attempt to sell a majority interest in the club failed, leading to the loss of its sport title and subsequent exclusion from Italian professional leagues.)	34	14	11	9	41	35	+6	53	Club dissolved
5	Albinoleffe	34	13	10	11	36	31	+5	49 (Note: Albinoleffe is ahead of FeralpiSalò on head-to-head points: Albinoleffe 3–1 FeralpiSalò, FeralpiSalò 1–2 Albinoleffe.)	Qualification to the promotion play-offs
6	FeralpiSalò	34	13	10	11	47	43	+4	49	Qualification to the promotion play-offs
7	Renate	34	12	12	10	34	31	+3	48 (Note: Renate is ahead of Bassano Virtus on head-to-head goal difference: Bassano Virtus 0–2 Renate, Renate 1–2 Bassano Virtus.)	Qualification to the promotion play-offs
8	Bassano Virtus (Note: Bassano Virtus merged with Vicenza after the season and relocated with the merged club playing as L.R. Vicenza Virtus and retaining the sporting title of Bassano Virtus.)	34	13	9	12	38	30	+8	48	Qualification to the promotion play-offs
9	Pordenone	34	11	13	10	46	44	+2	46	Qualification to the promotion play-offs
10	Mestre (Note: Mestre was deducted 2 points for irregularities. At the end of season the club attempted to enroll in the next championship, but anticipated new financial backers walked away, citing concerns over infrastructure, and the registration was rejected, leaving Mestre no better option but to play the 2018–19 season in Eccellenza.) (R)	34	12	10	12	40	36	+4	44	Relegation to Eccellenza
11	Triestina	34	9	16	9	42	36	+6	43 (Note: Triestina is ahead of Ravenna on head-to-head points: Triestina 1–1 Ravenna, Ravenna 1–5 Triestina.)	
12	Ravenna	34	12	7	15	31	38	−7	43	
13	Fano	34	9	11	14	25	31	−6	38 (Note: Fano is ahead of Fermana on head-to-head points: Fano 1–0 Fermana, Fermana 0–1 Fano.)	
14	Fermana	34	8	14	12	27	36	−9	38	
15	Gubbio	34	9	9	16	34	46	−12	36	
16	Teramo	34	6	17	11	33	42	−9	35 (Note: Teramo is ahead of Santarcangelo on total goal difference.)	
17	Santarcangelo (Note: Santarcangelo was deducted 3 points for irregularities.) (R)	34	9	11	14	33	52	−19	35	Qualification to the relegation play-outs
18	Vicenza (Note: Vicenza was deducted 4 points for irregularities and reduced to 3 points after appeal; Vicenza merged with Bassano Virtus after the season with the merged club playing as L.R. Vicenza Virtus and retaining the sporting title of Bassano Virtus, resulting in the loss of Vicenza's sporting title and the dissolution of the club. A newly-formed company, A.C. Vicenza 1902, requested the sporting title of Vicenza Calcio but was rejected by the Italian Football Federation.) (O)	34	8	11	15	29	39	−10	32	Club dissolved
19	Modena (Note: Modena was excluded from the league and dissolved after failing to attend four consecutive matches due to financial irregularities.) (D)	0	0	0	0	0	0	0	0	Club dissolved

Source: Soccerway, lega-pro.com
(C) Champions; (D) Disqualified; (O) Play-off winners; (P) Promoted; (R) Relegated

=== Group C (South) ===
Pos	Team	Pld	W	D	L	GF	GA	GD	Pts	Promotion, qualification or relegation
1	Lecce (C, P)	36	21	11	4	53	30	+23	74	Promotion to Serie B
2	Catania	36	21	7	8	65	31	+34	70	Qualification to the promotion play-offs
3	Trapani	36	19	11	6	60	35	+25	68	Qualification to the promotion play-offs
4	Juve Stabia	36	14	13	9	49	35	+14	55	Qualification to the promotion play-offs
5	Cosenza (O, P)	36	14	12	10	41	35	+6	54	Qualification to the promotion play-offs
6	Monopoli	36	14	11	11	46	35	+11	53	Qualification to the promotion play-offs
7	Casertana	36	13	11	12	37	32	+5	50 (Note: Casertana is ahead of Rende on head-to-head points: Casertana 0–0 Rende, Rende 0–1 Casertana.)	Qualification to the promotion play-offs
8	Rende	36	14	8	14	31	35	−4	50	Qualification to the promotion play-offs
9	Virtus Francavilla	36	10	16	10	35	43	−8	46 (Note: Virtus Francavilla is ahead of Sicula Leonzio on head-to-head points: Virtus Francavilla 2–1 Sicula Leonzio, Sicula Leonzio 2–2 Virtus Francavilla.)	Qualification to the promotion play-offs
10	Sicula Leonzio	36	11	13	12	37	37	0	46	Qualification to the promotion play-offs
11	Bisceglie	36	11	12	13	39	46	−7	45	
12	Matera (Note: Matera was deducted 13 points for irregularities.)	36	15	10	11	40	37	+3	42 (Note: Head-to-head points: Matera 12 pts, Siracusa 3 pts, Catanzaro 3 pts. Siracusa is ahead of Catanzaro on overall goal difference.)	
13	Siracusa (Note: Siracusa Calcio was deducted 10 points for irregularities.)	36	14	10	12	37	29	+8	42	
14	Catanzaro	36	11	9	16	35	45	−10	42	
15	Reggina	36	9	14	13	29	38	−9	41	
16	Fidelis Andria (Note: Fidelis Andria was deducted 3 points for irregularities. Fidelis Andria was denied registration for the 2018–19 Serie C, based on Covisoc's assessment of the club's debt situation.)	36	8	17	11	36	40	−4	38	Club dissolved
17	Paganese (O)	36	7	12	17	36	56	−20	33	Qualification to the relegation play-outs
18	Fondi (R)	36	7	9	20	33	52	−19	30	Qualification to the relegation play-outs
19	Akragas (Note: Akragas was deducted 15 points for irregularities.) (R)	36	3	6	27	18	66	−48	0	Relegation to Serie D

Source: Soccerway, lega-pro.com
(C) Champions; (O) Play-off winners; (P) Promoted; (R) Relegated

== Promotion play-offs ==
=== First round ===
If tied, higher-placed team advances.

Team 1	Score	Team 2
Viterbese	2–1	Pontedera
Carrarese	5–0	Pistoiese
Piacenza	4–2	Giana Erminio
Albinoleffe	2–2	Mestre
FeralpiSalò	3–1	Pordenone
Renate	0–2	Bassano Virtus
Cosenza	2–1	Sicula Leonzio
Monopoli	0–1	Virtus Francavilla
Casertana	2–1	Rende

=== Second round ===
If tied, higher-placed team advances.

Team 1	Score	Team 2
Monza	0–1	Piacenza
Viterbese	2–1	Carrarese
Reggiana	1–0	Bassano Virtus
Albinoleffe	0–1	FeralpiSalò
Juve Stabia	4–3	Virtus Francavilla
Cosenza	1–1	Casertana

=== Third round ===
If tied on aggregate, higher-placed team advances

Team 1	Agg.	Team 2	1st leg	2nd leg
Viterbese	4–2	Pisa	1–0	3–2
Piacenza	3–4	Sambenedettese	2–1	1–3
Cosenza	4–1	Trapani	2–1	2–0
FeralpiSalò	5–4	Alessandria	2–3	3–1
Juve Stabia	1–1	Reggiana	0–0	1–1

Notes

1. Reggiana advance due to better regular season point-per-game coefficient (1.56 vs. 1.53)

=== Fourth round ===
If tied on aggregate, higher-placed team advances

Team 1	Agg.	Team 2	1st leg	2nd leg
Reggiana	3–3	Siena	2–1	1–2
Viterbese	2–4	Südtirol	2–2	0–2
FeralpiSalò	1–3	Catania	1–1	0–2
Cosenza	4–1	Sambenedettese	2–1	2–0

=== Final four ===
No away goal rule applies. If tied after regular time, semifinal winner decided by extra-time and penalty shootout

Semi-finals
1	Siena	1	1	2 (4)
4	Catania	0	2	2 (3)
3	Südtirol	1	0	1
2	Cosenza	0	2	2

Final
Siena	1
Cosenza	3

Cosenza promoted to Serie B.

== Relegation play-outs ==
Loser on aggregate is relegated. Higher-placed team plays at home for second leg. If tied on aggregate, lower-placed team is relegated.

Team 1	Agg.	Team 2	1st leg	2nd leg
Cuneo	1–0	Gavorrano	1–0	0–0
Vicenza	3–2	Santarcangelo	2–1	1–1
Fondi	3–4	Paganese	2–2	1–2

== Top goalscorers ==
As of 16 June 2018

Rank	Player	Club	Goals
1	(Italy) Simone Guerra^{2}	Feralpisalò	21
2	(Italy) Daniele Vantaggiato	Livorno	19
3	(Italy) Francesco Tavano	Carrarese	18
4	(Italy) Rocco Costantino^{3}	Südtirol	17
5	(Italy) Davis Curiale^{1}	Catania	16
6	(Italy) Daniele Ragatzu	Olbia	15
7	(Italy) Salvatore Bruno	Giana Erminio	14
7	(Italy) Fabio Perna	Giana Erminio	14
7	(Italy) Massimiliano Pesenti^{2}	Piacenza	14
7	(Italy) Andrea Saraniti	Virtus Francavilla	14

Note

^{1}Player scored 1 goal in the play-offs.
^{2}Player scored 2 goals in the play-offs.
^{3}Player scored 3 goals in the play-offs.
