= Stefano Antezza =

Italian football player

Personal information
- Date of birth: 13 January 1996 (age 30)
- Place of birth: Bari, Italy
- Height: 1.84 m (6 ft 0 in)
- Position: Midfielder

Team information
- Current team: Sangiovannese

Youth career
- –2010: Matera
- 2010–2015: Juventus
- 2013–2014: → Carpi (loan)
- 2014–2015: → Spezia (loan)
- 2015: Spezia

Senior career*
Years	Team	Apps	(Gls)
2015–2019	Spezia	0	(0)
2016–2017	→ Como (loan)	17	(1)
2017–2018	→ Renate (loan)	11	(1)
2018–2019	→ Südtirol (loan)	18	(0)
2019–2021	Viterbese Castrense	19	(1)
2021	Paganese	7	(0)
2021–2022	Fano	16	(1)
2022	Trapani	11	(2)
2022–2023	Termoli	22	(0)
2023–2024	Notaresco	14	(0)
2024–	Sangiovannese	0	(0)

International career^{‡}
2011–2012	Italy U-16	11	(1)
2012	Italy U-17	1	(0)
- * Club domestic league appearances and goals as of 20 December 2023 ‡ National team caps and goals as of 31 August 2012

Stefano Antezza (born 13 January 1996) is an Italian football player who plays for Serie D club Sangiovannese.

== Club career ==
=== Spezia ===
==== Loan to Como ====
On 9 July 2016, Antezza was signed by Serie C side Como on a season-long loan deal. On 31 July he made his debut for Como in a 3–0 home win over Valdinievole Montecatini in the first round of Coppa Italia, he was replaced by Michele Mandelli in the 78th minute. On 28 August he made his Serie C debut for Como as a substitute replacing Davide Di Quinzio in the 87th minute of 2–2 away draw against Arezzo. On 2 October he scored his first professional goal, as a substitute, in the 90th minute of a 2–1 home win over Racing Club Roma. Seven days later, Antezza played his first match as a starter in Serie C, a 1–0 away win over Prato, he was replaced by Filippo Damian in the 82nd minute. On 20 November he played his first entire match for Como, a 2–2 home draw against Cremonese. On 18 February 2017 he was sent-off with a red card in the 53rd minute of a 3–2 away defeat against Racing Club Roma. Antezza ended his loan to Como with 19 appearances, 1 goal and 1 assist.

==== Loan to Renate ====
On 4 July 2017, Antezza was loaned to Serie C club Renate on a season-long loan deal. On 30 July he made his debut for Renate as a substitute replacing Antonio Palma in the 75th minute of a first round of Coppa Italia. On 27 August, Antezza made his Serie C debut for Renate as a substitute replacing Lorenzo Simonetti in the 64th minute and he scored his first goal for Renate in the 85th minute of a 3–0 home win over Padova. On 3 September he played his first entire match for Renate, a 1–0 away win over Feralpisalò. Antezza ended his season-long loan to Renate with 14 appearances, including only 4 as a starter, and 1 goal.

==== Loan to Südtirol ====
On 10 July 2018, Antezza was signed by Serie C side Südtirol on a season-long loan deal. On 29 July he made his debut for Südtirol as a substitute replacing Francesco De Rose in the 82nd minute of a 2–1 home win over Albalonga in the first round of Coppa Italia. On 17 September he made his Serie C debut for Südtirol as a substitute replacing Luca Beradocco in the 83rd minute of a 1–0 hom win over Teramo. On 7 October, Antezza played his first entire match for Südtirol, a 0–0 home draw against AlbinoLeffe. On 9 December he received a double yellow card, as a substitute, in the 66th minute of a 1–0 away defeat against Sambenedettese. Antezza ended his loan to Südtirol with 26 appearances, but only 3 as a starter.

=== Viterbese Castrense ===
On 26 July 2019, Antezza joined to Serie C club Viterbese Castrense on an undisclosed fee.

=== Paganese ===
On 19 January 2021 he moved to Paganese.

== International career ==
Antezza represented Italy at Under-16 and Under-17 levels. On 10 April 2012, Antezza made his debut at U-16 level in a 2–0 away win over Scotland U-16, he was replaced by Alberto Tibolla in the 51st minute. On 31 August 2012, Antezza made his debut at U-17 level as a substitute replacing Gennaro Tutino in the 60th minute of a 1–0 home defeat against Portugal U-17.

== Career statistics ==
=== Club ===
As of 17 August 2019

Club	Season	League			Cup		Europe		Other		Total	
Club	Season	League	Apps	Goals	Apps	Goals	Apps	Goals	Apps	Goals	Apps	Goals
Como (loan)	2016–17	Serie C	17	1	2	0	—		—		19	1
Renate (loan)	2017–18	Serie C	11	1	3	0	—		—		14	1
Südtirol (loan)	2018–19	Serie C	21	0	3	0	—		2 (Note: Appearance(s) in Serie C play-off.)	0	26	0
Career total			49	2	8	0	—		2	0	59	2
