= Matteo Di Piazza =

Italian footballer (born 1988)

Personal information
- Date of birth: 1 January 1988 (age 38)
- Place of birth: Partinico, Italy
- Height: 1.84 m (6 ft 0 in)
- Position: Forward

Team information
- Current team: Canosa 1948

Youth career
- –2006: Catania

Senior career*
Years	Team	Apps	(Gls)
2006–2007	Savoia	14	(2)
2007–2008	Vittoria	32	(17)
2008	Benevento	7	(1)
2009	Südtirol	11	(1)
2009–2010	Rimini	10	(1)
2010	→ Siracusa (loan)	12	(0)
2010	Chievo	0	(0)
2010–2013	Pro Vercelli	38	(7)
2013	→ Gubbio (loan)	8	(1)
2013–2014	Benevento	3	(0)
2014–2015	Savoia	24	(6)
2015	Maceratese	0	(0)
2015–2016	Akragas	32	(14)
2016–2017	Vicenza	8	(1)
2017–2018	Foggia	18	(5)
2017–2018	→ Lecce (loan)	31	(11)
2018–2019	Cosenza	6	(0)
2019–2020	Catania	40	(14)
2020–2021	Catanzaro	21	(4)
2021	→ Catania (loan)	14	(4)
2021–2022	Fidelis Andria	24	(4)
2022	Brindisi	10	(5)
2022–2023	Barletta	22	(4)
2023–2024	Cavese	27	(14)
2024	Pompei	10	(4)
2024–2025	Matera	23	(12)
2025–	Canosa 1948		
- * Club domestic league appearances and goals as of 4 November 2026

Matteo Di Piazza (born 1 Jan 1988) is an Italian footballer who plays as a forward for Canosa 1948.

== Career ==
Di Piazza made his Serie C debut for Rimini on 24 August 2009 in a game against Pescara.

On 18 January 2019, he signed a 2.5-year contract with Catania.

On 22 January 2020, he joined Catanzaro on a 2.5-year contract. On 28 January 2021 he returned to Catania on loan.

On 16 August 2021, he moved to Fidelis Andria.

On 19 August 2022, Di Piazza signed with Brindisi in Serie D.

On 1 December 2022, Di Piazza signed with Barletta in Serie D.

On 10 November 2023, Di Piazza joined Serie D side Cavese.

== Honours ==
=== Club ===
Foggia

- Lega Pro: 2016–17 (Group C)
- Supercoppa di Serie C: 2017

Lecce

- Serie C: 2017–18 (Group C)

=== Individual ===
Performances

- Coppa Italia top-goalscorer: 2017–18 (shared, 4 goals)
