= Nicola Luche =

Italian footballer

Personal information
- Full name: Nicola Luche
- Date of birth: 22 April 1998 (age 28)
- Place of birth: Brescia, Italy
- Height: 1.67 m (5 ft 6 in)
- Position: Forward

Youth career
- –2016: FeralpiSalò

Senior career*
Years	Team	Apps	(Gls)
2016–2018	FeralpiSalò	45	(3)
2018	Reggiana	10	(0)
2019	Calvina	16	(0)
2019–2020	Bovezzo		
- * Club domestic league appearances and goals as of 29 May 2018

Nicola Luche (born 22 April 1998) is an Italian football player. He plays as a forward.

== Club career ==
=== FeralpiSalò ===
On 31 July 2016, Luche made his professional debut for FeralpiSalò as a starter in a 3–2 home defeat after extra-time in the first round of Coppa Italia, he was replaced by Medin Murati in the 70th minute. On 27 August 2016 he made his debut in Serie C as a substitute replacing Simone Guerra in the 70th minute of a 3–1 away defeat against Santarcangelo. On 13 September he scored his first professional goal, as a substitute, in the 73rd minute of a 3–2 home win over Lumezzane. On 26 March 2017 he played his first entire match for FeralpiSalò, a 2–0 away defeat against Maceratese.

== Career statistics ==
=== Club ===
As of 29 May 2018

Club	Season	League			Cup		Europe		Other		Total	
Club	Season	League	Apps	Goals	Apps	Goals	Apps	Goals	Apps	Goals	Apps	Goals
FeralpiSalò	2016–17	Serie C	27	3	1	0	—		—		28	3
FeralpiSalò	2017–18	Serie C	12	0	1	0	—		—		13	0
Career total			39	3	2	0	—		—		41	3
