= Giovanni Tomi =

Italian footballer

Personal information
- Date of birth: 31 December 1987 (age 38)
- Place of birth: San Giorgio a Cremano, Italy
- Height: 1.80 m (5 ft 11 in)
- Position: Defender

Team information
- Current team: Prato

Youth career
- Catanzaro

Senior career*
Years	Team	Apps	(Gls)
2005–2006	Maceratese	18	(0)
2006–2007	Sibilla El Brazil	33	(3)
2007–2009	Catanzaro	58	(1)
2009–2010	Marcianise	29	(4)
2010–2012	Foggia	29	(1)
2012	→ Ascoli (loan)	14	(0)
2012–2013	Lecce	15	(0)
2013–2014	Pavia	11	(0)
2014	Rimini	12	(0)
2014–2015	Martina Franca	30	(0)
2015–2016	Matera	32	(2)
2016–2017	Prato	27	(5)
2017–2018	Sambenedettese	36	(2)
2018–	Prato	0	(0)
- * Club domestic league appearances and goals as of 1 October 2018

Giovanni Tomi (born 31 December 1987) is an Italian footballer who currently plays as a defender for Prato.
