= Valerio Nava =

Italian footballer (born 1994)

Personal information
- Date of birth: 17 January 1994 (age 32)
- Place of birth: Calcinate, Italy
- Height: 1.75 m (5 ft 9 in)
- Position: Right back

Team information
- Current team: Lentigione
- Number: 6

Youth career
- Atalanta

Senior career*
Years	Team	Apps	(Gls)
2012–2018	Atalanta	0	(0)
2013–2014	→ Novara (loan)	9	(0)
2014–2015	→ Carpi (loan)	1	(0)
2015	→ SPAL (loan)	16	(0)
2015–2016	→ Ascoli (loan)	5	(0)
2016	→ Cittadella (loan)	11	(0)
2016–2017	→ Catania (loan)	9	(0)
2017	→ Alessandria (loan)	2	(0)
2017–2018	→ Juve Stabia (loan)	33	(0)
2018–2019	Pro Piacenza	14	(0)
2019–2020	Rimini	18	(0)
2020–2021	Vis Pesaro	31	(2)
2021–2022	Pergolettese	18	(1)
2022	Albalonga	12	(0)
2022–2023	Monte Procedo	15	(0)
2023–	Lentigione	5	(0)

International career
2013	Italy U20	2	(0)
- * Club domestic league appearances and goals as of 8 October 2023

Valerio Nava (born 17 January 1994) is an Italian footballer who plays as a right back for Serie D club Lentigione.

== Club career ==
Nava was born in Calcinate, and began his career in local Atalanta, being assigned to the Primavera squad in 2011.

On 9 July 2013, after finishing his graduation, Nava was loaned to Serie B club Novara. He played his first match as a professional on 11 August, starting in a 3–0 home success against Grosseto, for the campaign's Coppa Italia.

Nava made his Serie B debut late in the month, playing the full 90 minutes in a 2–1 home win against Siena Calcio.

In subsequent seasons, he alternates between the Serie B and Lega Pro playing respectively for Carpi, Spal, Ascoli, Cittadella, Catania and Alessandria.

On 9 January 2019, he signed a 1.5-year contract with Rimini.

On 9 January 2020, he signed a 1.5-year contract with Vis Pesaro.

On 31 August 2021, he moved to Serie C club Pergolettese.
