= Nicolò Palazzolo =

Italian footballer (born 1994)

Personal information
- Date of birth: 29 November 1994 (age 31)
- Place of birth: Turin, Italy
- Height: 1.85 m (6 ft 1 in)
- Position: Midfielder

Team information
- Current team: Valenzana Mado
- Number: 21

Youth career
- –2012: Juventus
- 2012: Cuneo

Senior career*
Years	Team	Apps	(Gls)
2010–2011	→ Canavese (loan)	1	(0)
2012–2014	Cuneo	46	(2)
2014	Lumezzane	0	(0)
2014–2015	Barletta	16	(1)
2015–2016	Bellinzago	21	(2)
2016–2017	Cuneo	30	(2)
2017–2018	Varese	31	(12)
2018–2020	Gozzano	57	(6)
2020–2022	Giana Erminio	55	(6)
2022–2023	Piacenza	28	(2)
2023–2024	Città di Varese	29	(6)
2024–2025	Akragas		
2025	Vogherese	13	(1)
2025–	Valenzana Mado	19	(5)
- * Club domestic league appearances and goals as of 26 June 2026

Nicolò Palazzolo (born 29 November 1994) is an Italian professional footballer who plays as a midfielder for Serie D club Valenzana Mado.

== Club career ==
On 13 July 2022, Palazzollo signed a two-year contract with Piacenza.
