= Salvatore Burrai =

Italian footballer (born 1987)

Personal information
- Date of birth: 26 May 1987 (age 39)
- Place of birth: Sassari, Italy
- Height: 1.77 m (5 ft 10 in)
- Position: Midfielder

Youth career
- Cagliari

Senior career*
Years	Team	Apps	(Gls)
2007–2010	Cagliari	5	(0)
2007–2008	→ Manfredonia (loan)	23	(1)
2009	→ Ternana (loan)	5	(0)
2009–2010	→ Cremonese (loan)	14	(0)
2010–2011	Foggia	26	(0)
2011–2012	Cagliari	0	(0)
2012–2013	Latina	40	(2)
2013–2014	Modena	12	(0)
2014–2015	Monza	12	(0)
2015	Juve Stabia	11	(0)
2015–2016	Robur Siena	28	(3)
2016–2020	Pordenone	132	(21)
2020–2022	Perugia	60	(5)
2022–2023	Pordenone	36	(2)
2023–2025	Mantova	58	(5)
2025–2026	Dolomiti	35	(1)
2026-	Pordenone		

International career^{‡}
2004	Italy U17	1	(0)
2007–2008	Italy U20	6	(0)
- * Club domestic league appearances and goals as of 30 April 2026 ‡ National team caps and goals as of 24 March 2008

Salvatore Burrai (born 26 May 1987) is an Italian professional footballer who plays as a midfielder.

== Career ==
Born in Sassari, Sardinia, Burrai started his career at Sardinian club Cagliari. He made his Serie A debut in the last round of 2006–07 Serie A.

He left for various Serie C1 clubs from 2007 to 2011, with Foggia also received half of the registration rights for a peppercorn fee of €500. In June 2011 Foggia bought Burrai and Marco Sau outright for €207,000. However, on 31 August 2011 they were bought back from Foggia, for €207,000 (Sau) and for free (Burrai). In January 2012 Burrai was signed by Latina, again in co-ownership deal for €500. In June 2012 Cagliari gave up the remain 50% registration rights.

On 31 August 2013, Burrai was signed by Serie B club Modena, with Alberto Massacci moved to Latina in temporary deal.

On 3 July 2014, Burrai was signed by Serie C club Monza in a three-year contract. On 22 December 2014, Burrai was released.

In January 2015 he was signed by Juve Stabia in a 1 1/2-year deal.

On 28 July, he was signed by S.S. Robur Siena on a free transfer.

In the summer of 2016 he moved to Pordenone.

On 9 September 2020, he went to Perugia.

On 15 July 2022, Burrai returned to Pordenone.

On 18 July 2023, Burrai signed with Mantova.
