= Davide Marcandella =

Italian footballer (born 1997)

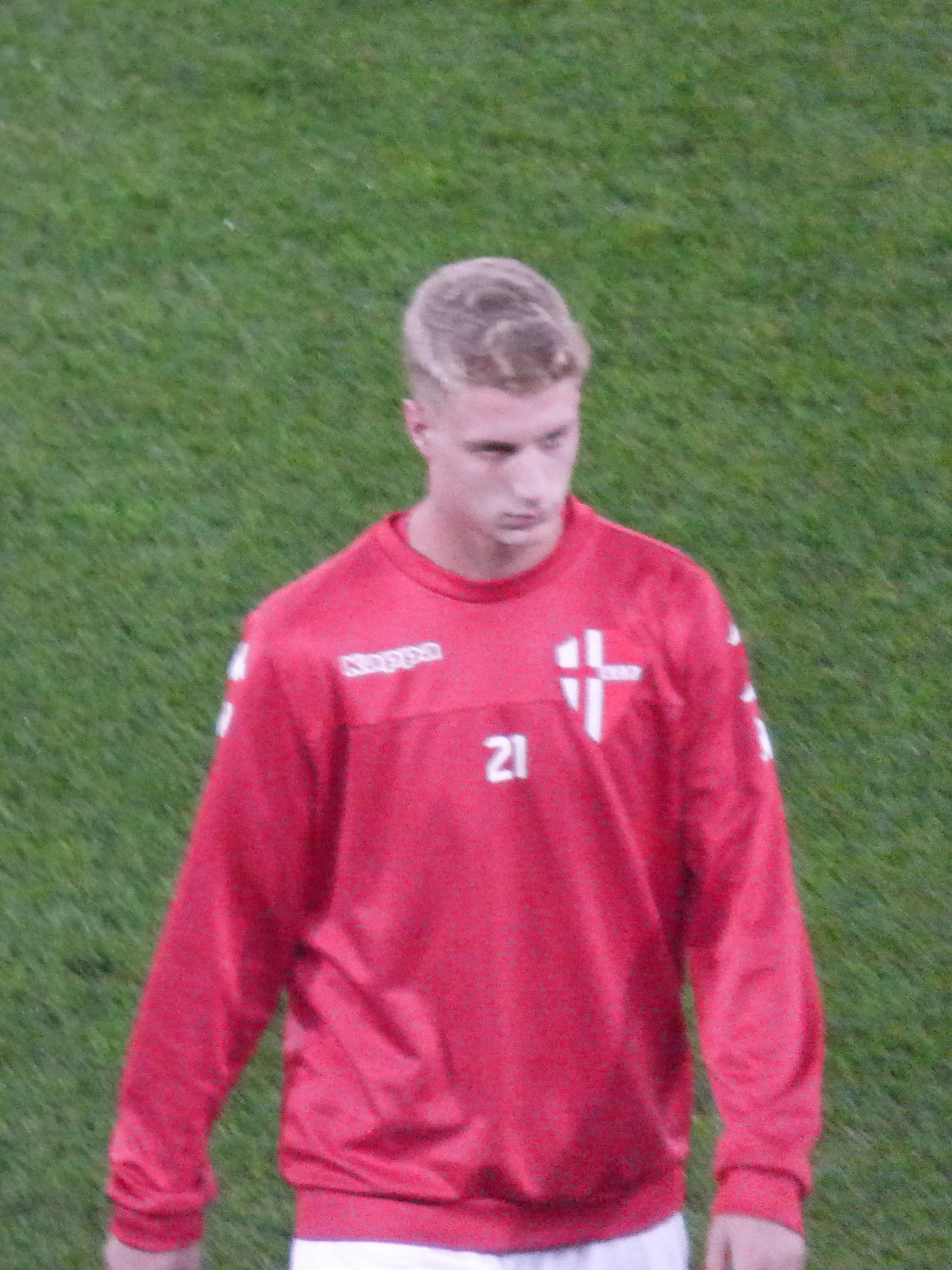
- Marcandella with Padova in 2018

Personal information
- Date of birth: 21 March 1997 (age 29)
- Place of birth: Padua, Italy
- Height: 1.73 m (5 ft 8 in)
- Positions: Attacking midfielder; winger

Team information
- Current team: Clodiense
- Number: 21

Youth career
- –2015: Padova

Senior career*
Years	Team	Apps	(Gls)
2015–2021	Padova	24	(0)
2015–2016	→ Este (loan)	36	(9)
2017	→ Adriese (loan)	17	(6)
2019–2021	→ Virtus Verona (loan)	42	(5)
2021–2024	Vis Pesaro	42	(4)
2024	→ Fermana (loan)	11	(0)
2024–2026	Mestre	63	(11)
2026–	Clodiense	0	(0)
- * Club domestic league appearances and goals as of 26 September 2026

Davide Marcandella (born 21 March 1997) is an Italian footballer who plays as a midfielder for Clodiense.

== Career ==
He was raised in the Padova junior teams. He made his senior football debut in the 2015–16 season in Serie D on loan to Este. Upon returning from loan, he didn't make any appearances in the first half of the 2016–17 season, and on 4 January 2017 he was loaned to another Serie D club, Adriese.

He made his Serie C debut for Padova on 14 October 2017 in a game against Teramo, as an 80th-minute substitute for Giampiero Pinzi. On 1 March 2018, he extended his Padova contract until June 2020. For the 2018–19 season, Padova advanced to Serie B, with Marcandella making his debut on that level.

On 2 September 2019, he extended his Padova contract until 2022 and was loaned to Virtus Verona for the 2019–20 season. On 29 August 2020, the loan was extended for the 2020–21 season.

On 7 July 2021, he joined Vis Pesaro on a two-year contract with an additional one-year extension option.

On 12 January 2024, Marcandella moved on loan to Fermana.

On 21 August 2024, his contract with Vis Pesaro was terminated by mutual consent.
