= Giancarlo Malcore =

Italian footballer

Personal information
- Date of birth: 26 December 1993 (age 32)
- Place of birth: Milan, Italy
- Height: 1.86 m (6 ft 1 in)
- Position: Forward

Team information
- Current team: Team Altamura
- Number: 9

Youth career
- Salice
- –2012: Lecce
- 2010–2011: → Gallipoli (loan)

Senior career*
Years	Team	Apps	(Gls)
2012–2014	Lecce	9	(0)
2013–2014	→ Nocerina (loan)	14	(2)
2014	→ Chieti (loan)	3	(0)
2014–2015	Paganese	9	(0)
2015–2016	Nardò	27	(8)
2016–2017	Manfredonia	26	(13)
2017–2018	Carpi	19	(5)
2018–2019	Cittadella	5	(0)
2019	→ Fermana (loan)	15	(2)
2019–2020	Pergolettese	18	(1)
2020–2024	Audace Cerignola	129	(72)
2024–2025	Casarano	44	(21)
2025–2026	Barletta	14	(8)
2026–	Team Altamura	1	(0)
- * Club domestic league appearances and goals as of 29 August 2026

Giancarlo Malcore (born 26 December 1993) is an Italian football player who plays as a forward for Serie C Group C club Team Altamura.

== Club career ==
Born in Milan, he began his career at local club Lecce, playing for the youth teams.

He made his Lega Pro Prima Divisione debut for Lecce on 16 September 2012 in a game against San Marino.

On 31 January 2019, he joined Fermana on loan.

On 17 July 2019, he joined Pergolettese.

On 25 July 2024, Malcore moved to Casarano in Serie D.
