= Antonio Palma =

Italian footballer (born 1994)

Personal information
- Date of birth: 3 January 1994 (age 32)
- Place of birth: Monza, Italy
- Height: 1.87 m (6 ft 2 in)
- Position: Midfielder

Team information
- Current team: AC Leon
- Number: 27

Youth career
- 1999–2001: Ges Monza
- 2001–2002: San Fruttuoso Monza
- 2002–2013: Atalanta

Senior career*
Years	Team	Apps	(Gls)
2013–2018	Atalanta	1	(0)
2013–2014	→ Nocerina (loan)	17	(0)
2014	→ Como (loan)	1	(0)
2014–2015	→ Cittadella (loan)	5	(0)
2015	→ FeralpiSalò (loan)	10	(0)
2015	→ Juve Stabia (loan)	1	(0)
2015–2016	→ Teramo (loan)	5	(1)
2016–2018	→ Renate (loan)	70	(6)
2018–2020	Giana Erminio	15	(2)
2019–2020	→ Rimini (loan)	42	(2)
2020–2021	Piacenza	35	(2)
2021	Seregno	1	(0)
2021–2022	Imolese	16	(0)
2022–2025	Alcione	81	(11)
2024–2025	Piacenza	0	(0)
2025–	AC Leon	11	(1)

International career
2010	Italy U-16	1	(0)
2012–2013	Italy U-19	7	(2)
2014	Italy U-20	1	(0)
- * Club domestic league appearances and goals as of 11 January 2025

Antonio Palma (born 3 January 1994) is an Italian footballer who plays as a midfielder for Serie D club AC Leon.

== Club career ==
Palma began his career on Atalanta's youth categories, and was promoted to main squad for 2012–13 season, receiving the no. 94 jersey.

On 12 May 2013, Palma made his professional debut, in a 1–2 away loss against Udinese, after came off the bench to replace Ivan Radovanović in 71st minute. It was his maiden appearance in the competition.

On 3 August 2013, Palma was loaned to Nocerina. Still owned by La Dea, he represented Como and Cittadella also in temporary deals.

On 15 January 2019, he joined Rimini on loan.

On 2 October 2021, he signed for Imolese.

On 1 July 2022, Palma moved to Alcione in Serie D.

== International career ==
On 16 November 2012, he was called up for Italy U19's. He made his debut on the 21st, and scored the second of a 4–0 routing over Czech Republic.
