= Stadio XXI Settembre-Franco Salerno =

Stadium in Matera, Italy

Coordinates: 40°40′26″N 16°36′14″E

- Interactive map of Stadio XXI Settembre-Franco Salerno
- Location: Matera, Italy
- Owner: Municipality of Matera
- Capacity: 7,490
- Surface: Grass

Tenant
- Matera Calcio

Stadio XXI Settembre-Franco Salerno is a multi-use stadium in Matera, Italy. It is currently used mostly for football matches and is the home ground of Matera Calcio. The stadium holds 7,490 people.

The stadium hosted two matches of Italy's Under-21 team in 1995 and 2014.
