= Fabio Perna =

Italian footballer

Personal information
- Date of birth: 30 September 1986 (age 40)
- Place of birth: Milan, Italy
- Height: 1.82 m (6 ft 0 in)
- Position: Forward

Team information
- Current team: Colognese

Senior career*
Years	Team	Apps	(Gls)
2003–2006	Atletico CVS		
2006–2007	Oltrepò		
2007–2008	Atletico CVS		
2008–2009	Accademia Sandonatese		
2009–2012	Sancolombano	?	(37)
2012–2024	Giana Erminio	316	(82)
2024–2026	Pavia	10	(3)
2026–	Colognese		
- * Club domestic league appearances and goals as of 11 January 2026

Fabio Perna (born 30 September 1986) is an Italian professional footballer who plays as a forward for Eccellenza club Colognese.

== Club career ==
Perna started his career on Promozione clubs. He joined to Eccellenza club Sancolombano for the 2009–10 season.

Perna joined to Giana Erminio in the 2012–13 Promozione season, and won the promotion with the team to Serie D, and to the Serie C the next year.

The forward made his debut in Serie C on 5 September 2014 against Lumezzane.
