= AS Pro Piacenza 1919 =

Italian football club

Pro Piacenza
- Full name: Associazione Sportiva Pro Piacenza 1919 S.r.l.
- Nickname(s): Il Pro (The Pro); Rossoneri (Red-blacks)
- Founded: 1919 (as Pro Piacenza); 2013 (re-foundation by a merger)
- Dissolved: 2019
- Ground: Stadio Leonardo Garilli (competitive matches); Centro Sportivo G. Siboni (non-competitive matches)
- Capacity: 21,668
- Owner: Sèleco
- Chairman: Maurizio Pannella
- 2018–19: Serie C, Group A, 20th
Home colours	Away colours	Third colours

Associazione Sportiva Pro Piacenza 1919 S.r.l. or simply Pro Piacenza was an Italian association football club, based in Piacenza, Emilia-Romagna. The club played in Serie C, the third tier of Italian football, until 18 February 2019 when they were excluded from the division.

The most recent re-foundation of the club, was a merger of A.C.D. Pro Piacenza 1919 and A.S.D. Atletico B.P. Pro Piacenza in June 2013. From 2014 to 2019, Pro Piacenza played in the professional league in Serie C division.

== History ==
=== Predecessors ===
==== A.C.D. Pro Piacenza 1919 ====
The team was founded in 1919 as the merger of two pre-existing clubs, the Ausonia and the Bandiera, both from Piacenza and playing in occasional amateur activity.

Since its founding, Pro Piacenza adopted mesh with vertical stripes red-black, although in the early years they also often used green shirts, because they were more readily available.

The denomination of the club was changed from A.C. Pro Piacenza 1919 to A.C.D. Pro Piacenza 1919 circa 2004–05 season. A.C.D. was an initial of "Associazione Calcio Dilettantistica", which stand for amateur football association.

Pro Piacenza have always participated in the amateur leagues, without ever being able to reach professionals.

In 2009–10 Promozione Emilia-Romagna season, Pro Piacenza retained its place in the division. While BettolaSpes (later known as B.P. Pro Piacenza), the club which merged with Pro Piacenza in year 2013, won promotion to Eccellenza Emilia-Romagna. Another related club, Pontolliese Libertas (which Pontolliese demerged and merged with aforementioned Bettola in July 2010), relegated from Promozione Emilia-Romagna to Prima Categoria.

However, Pro Piacenza later withdrew from 2010–11 Promozione Emilia-Romagna, while aforementioned Libertas (known as LibertaSpes at that time) was repêchage to that division. Pro Piacenza played in the lower division instead.

In the last season as A.C.D. Pro Piacenza 1919, the club relegated from Seconda Categoria to Terza Categoria in June 2013. After the season, the club merged with "B.P. Pro Piacenza".

==== Atletico B.P. Pro Piacenza ====
A.S.D. Atletico BP Pro Piacenza was a football club based in Centro Sportivo Gianni Siboni, Piacenza, A.S.D. meaning "Associazione Sportiva Dilettantistica" or amateur football association. The club last participated in 2012–13 Serie D. The head coach at that time was Arnaldo Franzini.

The very origin of Atletico BP Pro Piacenza could be traced to 2P Calcio Bettola (registration number 630,411) based in Bettola, in the province of Piacenza. The club was renamed to A.S.D. Bettola Calcio 1927 circa 2004–05 season.

In 2005–06 season, Bettola Calcio 1927 was merged with "G.S.D. Spes" (registration number 50,200, formerly "G.S. Spes"), based in Piacenza. The headquarters of the new club, G.S.D. BettolaSpes, which had a new registration number 915,404, was based in Piacenza. G.S.D. was an initial of Gruppo Sportivo Dilettantistico.

In 2010, BettolaSpes was "merged" again with Pontolliese with the following changes: In July 2010, "A.C.D. Pontolliese Libertas 1907" was renamed to A.C.D. LibertaSpes, while BettolaSpes was renamed to A.S.D. BettolaPonte. Which "Pontolliese Libertas" itself was formed circa 2002–03 season by a merger of U.S. Pontolliese, based in Ponte dell'Olio and "A.C. Libertas", based in Piacenza. U.S. was an initial of "Unione Sportiva".

BettolaPonte was promoted to Serie D in June 2011. The club adopted the denomination A.S.D. Atletico B.P. Pro Piacenza in July 2011. The logo of the club also featured year 2011 on it.

Atletico B.P. Pro Piacenza also planned to merge with Lupa Piacenza (formerly LibertaSpes) in 2012. LibertaSpes acquired the branding rights to become the official phoenix club of Piacenza Calcio, which was bankrupted in 2012. However, no merger with Lupa Piacenza was materialized.

=== A.S. Pro Piacenza 1919 ===
In June 2013 Atletico BP Pro Piacenza, a Serie D club, merged with A.C.D. Pro Piacenza 1919 which played in lower division, to form A.S.D. Pro Piacenza 1919. It was reported that the merger was agreed in 2012.

On 17 April 2014, after beating Sambonifacese 2–0 at home, Pro Piacenza gained promotion to Lega Pro, winning the Group B of the 2013–14 Serie D season. For the first time in 95 years, the team played professional football.

In July 2014 the club was again renamed to A.S. Pro Piacenza 1919 S.r.l., dropping the D. which stands for amateur in Italian language.

In 2016, Alberto Burzoni succeed Domenico Scorsetti as the chairman of the club.

In June 2018, Burzoni sold the club to Italian consumer electronics company Sèleco.

==== 2019 bankruptcy ====
On 17 February 2019, the club experienced a historic 20–0 loss to fellow Serie C team Cuneo, after having only fielded seven teenage players, one of which doubled as a coach. The coaching staff had prior to the match rescinded their contracts after having not been paid since the start of the season. The membership of the club in the Italian Football Federation was cancelled on the following day after already missing several previous fixtures.

== Colors and badge ==
Logo of Atletico BP Pro Piacenza

The team's colors are red and black.

The logo of A.S. Pro Piacenza 1919 also features the red and black stripes that resemble the team jersey. It also displays 1919, the year of the foundation of the (first) Pro Piacenza on it.

One of the predecessors of the current club, Atletico B.P. Pro Piacenza, also used red and black stripes on the logo but had 2011, the year that club was renamed to "Atletico B.P. Pro Piacenza" on it.

== Stadiums ==
A.S. Pro Piacenza 1919 play their home matches at the Stadio Leonardo Garilli, located in the city of Piacenza.

Before the Stadio Leonardo Garilli, they played at the stadio comunale and Centro Sportivo Gianni Siboni, both located in the city of Piacenza.

Centro Sportivo Gianni Siboni, located on 1 via Roberto de Longe, is also the current headquarters of A.S. Pro Piacenza 1919 as well as the former headquarters of A.C.D. Pro Piacenza 1919, one of the predecessors of the current club. Another predecessor, Atletico BP Pro Piacenza, played their home matches at the centro sportivo in 2012–13 season, as well as headquartered in that sports centre from 2010 to circa 2013.

However, as of 2009–10 season, when Atletico B.P. Pro Piacenza was still known as BettolaSpes, they based on "Campo Calcio Sandro Puppo", 1 via Monte Carevolo, Piacenza instead. Bettola was demerged with Spes in July 2010 and merged with Pontolliese at the same time. While Spes merged with A.C. Libertas which the latter was demerged with Pontolliese. However, LibertaSpes became Lupa Piacenza in 2012. Spes and one of their successor, U.P.D. Spes Borgotrebbia, were also based in "Campo Calcio Sandro Puppo" (section B of that complex), but under different address (on via Antonio Anguissola instead). Another Spes' successor that founded in 2013, Associazione Calcistica Dilettantistica LibertaSpes, used Campo "G. Calamari" instead. That complex was the home base of yet another team of the city, A.C. Fiore, as well as "Pontolliese Libertas". The latter, was also one of the predecessors of both "B.P. Pro Piacenza" and LibertaSpes.

In 2010–11 season, when Atletico BP Pro Piacenza was still known as BettolaPonte, they played their home matches in Podenzano occasionally.

Stadium / Predecessors of Pro Piacenza	A.S. Pro Piacenza 1919	BettolaPonte Pro Piacenza	A.C.D. Pro Piacenza 1919	BettolaSpes	Pontolliese Libertas
Stadio Leonardo Garilli	check				
Centro Sportivo Gianni Siboni	check	check	check		
Campo Calcio Sandro Puppo				check	
Campo G. Calamari					check

== Honours ==
as BettolaPonte

- Eccellenza Emilia-Romagna
  - Champions: 2010–11 (Group A)

as A.S.D. Pro Piacenza 1919

- Serie D
  - Champions: 2013–14 (Group B)
