= Stadio Polisportivo Provinciale =

Coordinates: 38°01′42″N 12°32′45″E

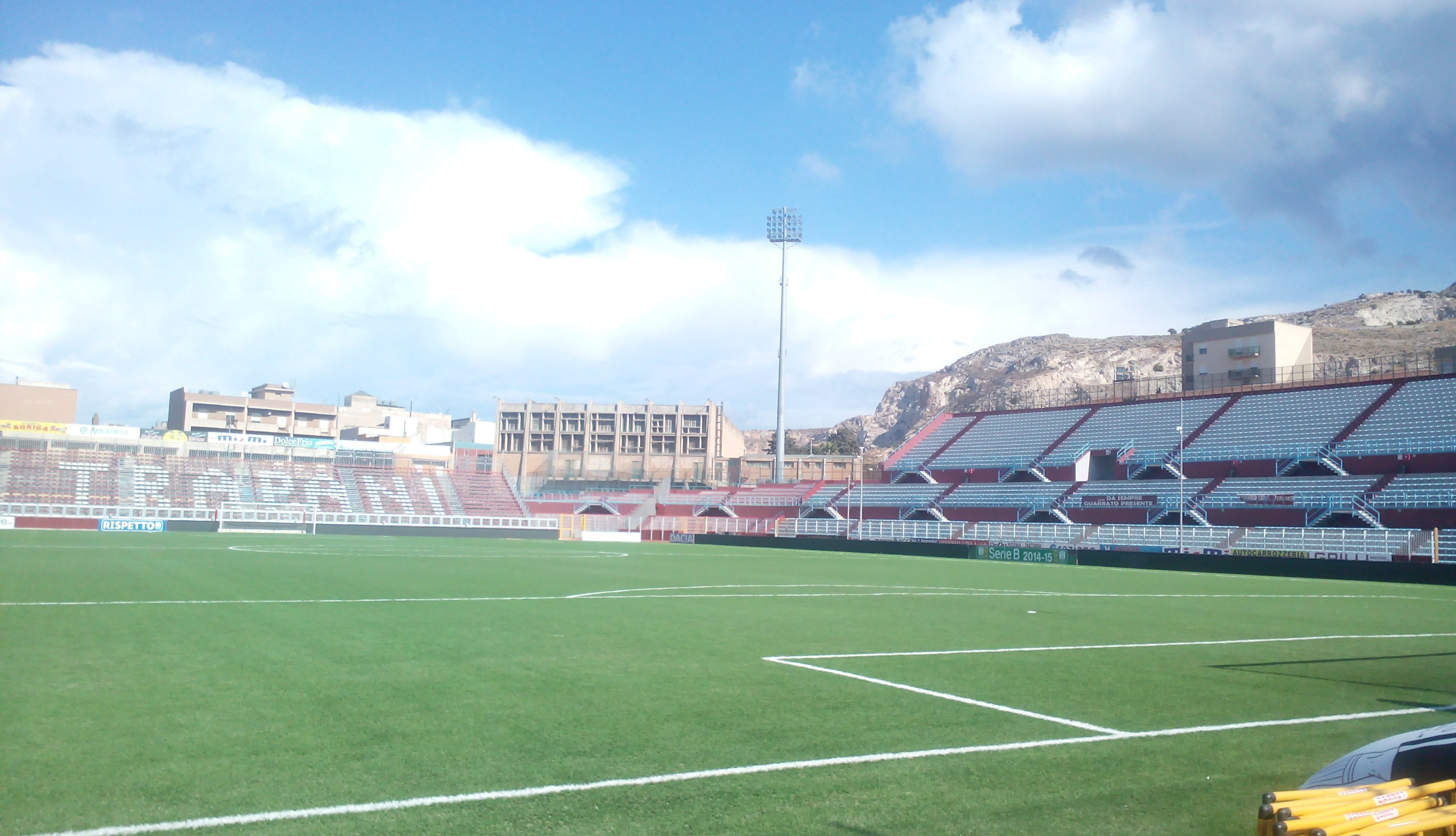
- Interactive map of Stadio Polisportivo Provinciale
- Location: Erice, Italy
- Owner: Province of Trapani
- Capacity: 7,000
- Surface: Artificial Turf; 105x65 m

Construction
- Opened: 1960
- Renovated: 1987

Tenant
- Trapani Calcio

Stadio Polisportivo Provinciale is a multi-use stadium in Erice, Italy. It is being used by the football team Trapani Calcio and was built by the Province of Trapani in the 1960. The grass covers 105x65 metres.
