= Stadio Città di Gorgonzola =

Multi-use stadium in Gorgonzola, Italy

Coordinates: 45°31′43.6″N 9°24′07″E

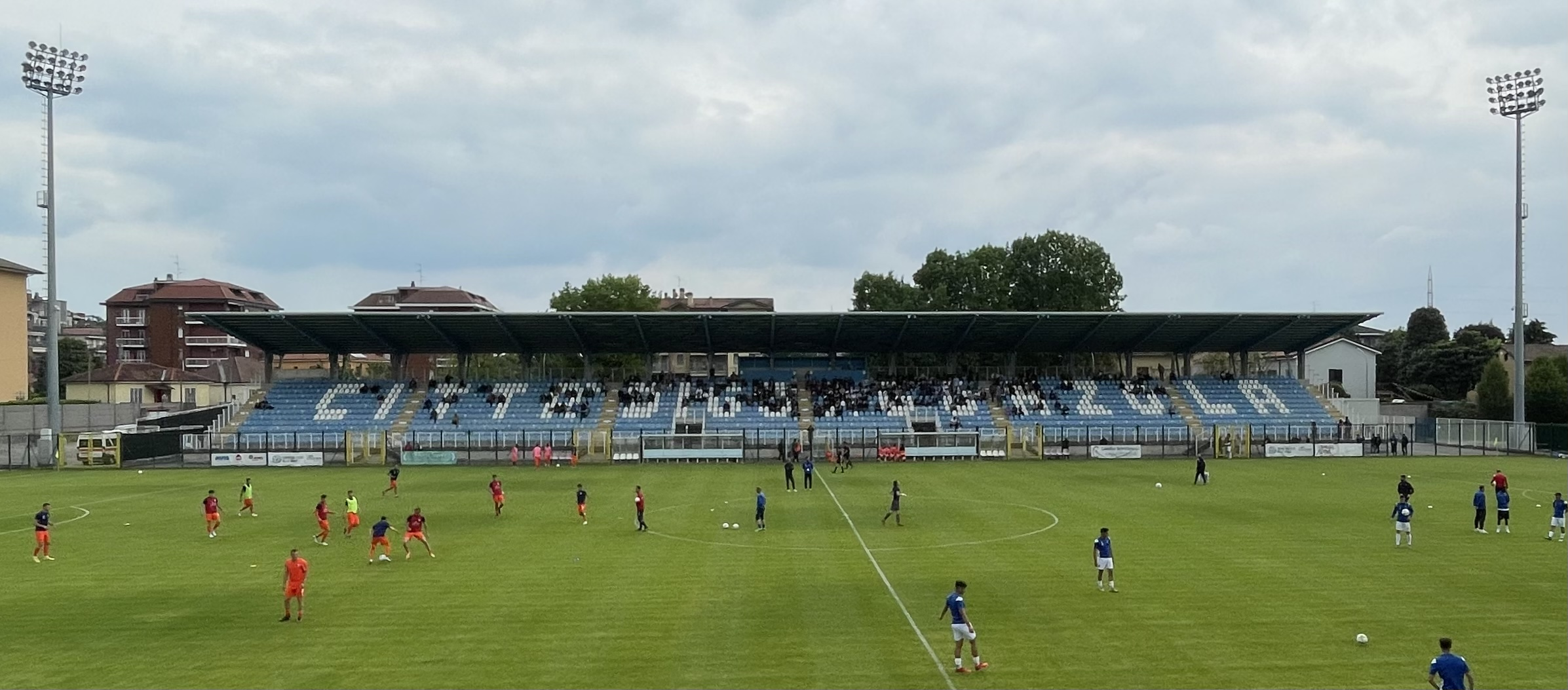
- Interactive map of Stadio Città di Gorgonzola
- Location: Gorgonzola, Italy
- Owner: Comune of Gorgonzola
- Capacity: 3,766
- Surface: Grass

Construction
- Opened: 1967
- Renovated: 2010

Tenant
- Giana Erminio

Stadio Città di Gorgonzola is a multi-use stadium in Gorgonzola, Italy. It is currently used mostly for football matches and is the home ground of Giana Erminio. The stadium holds 3,766.

== Gallery ==
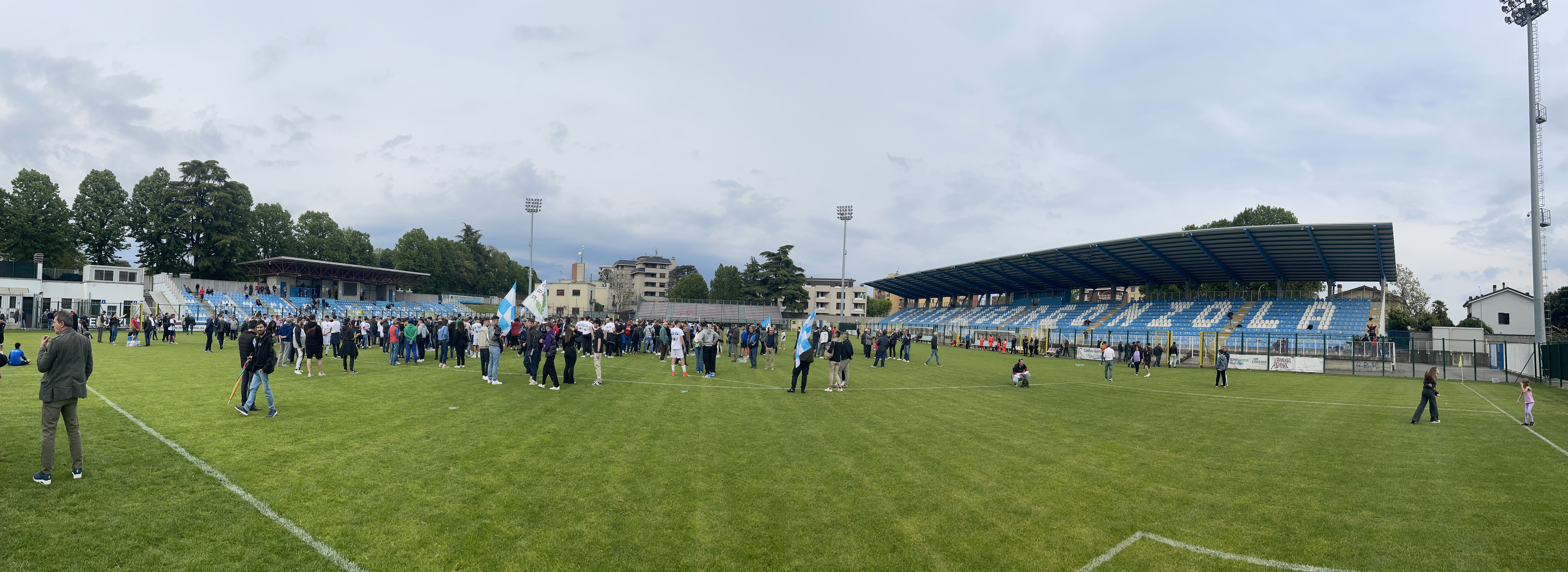
Stadium panorama

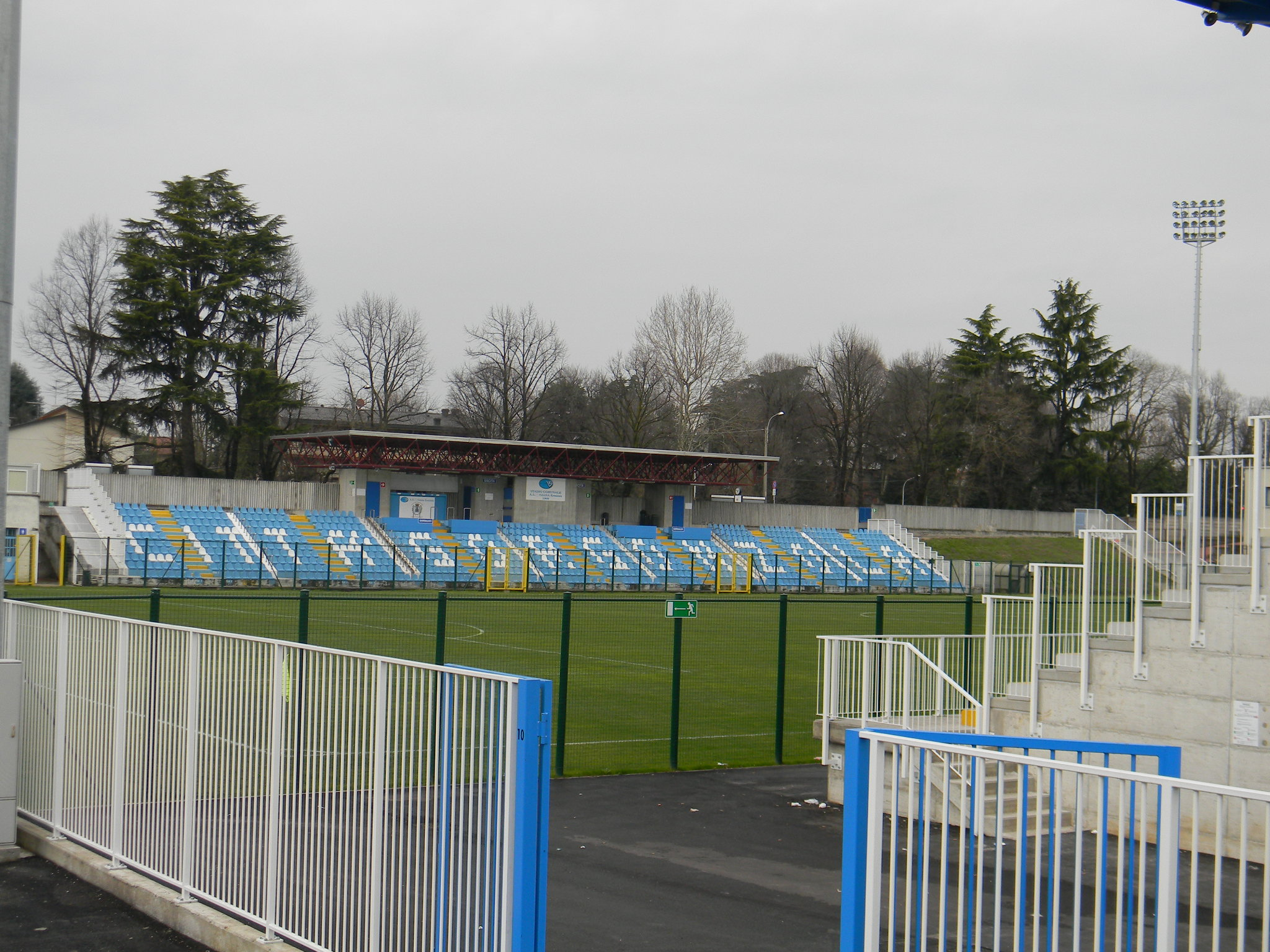
North Stand

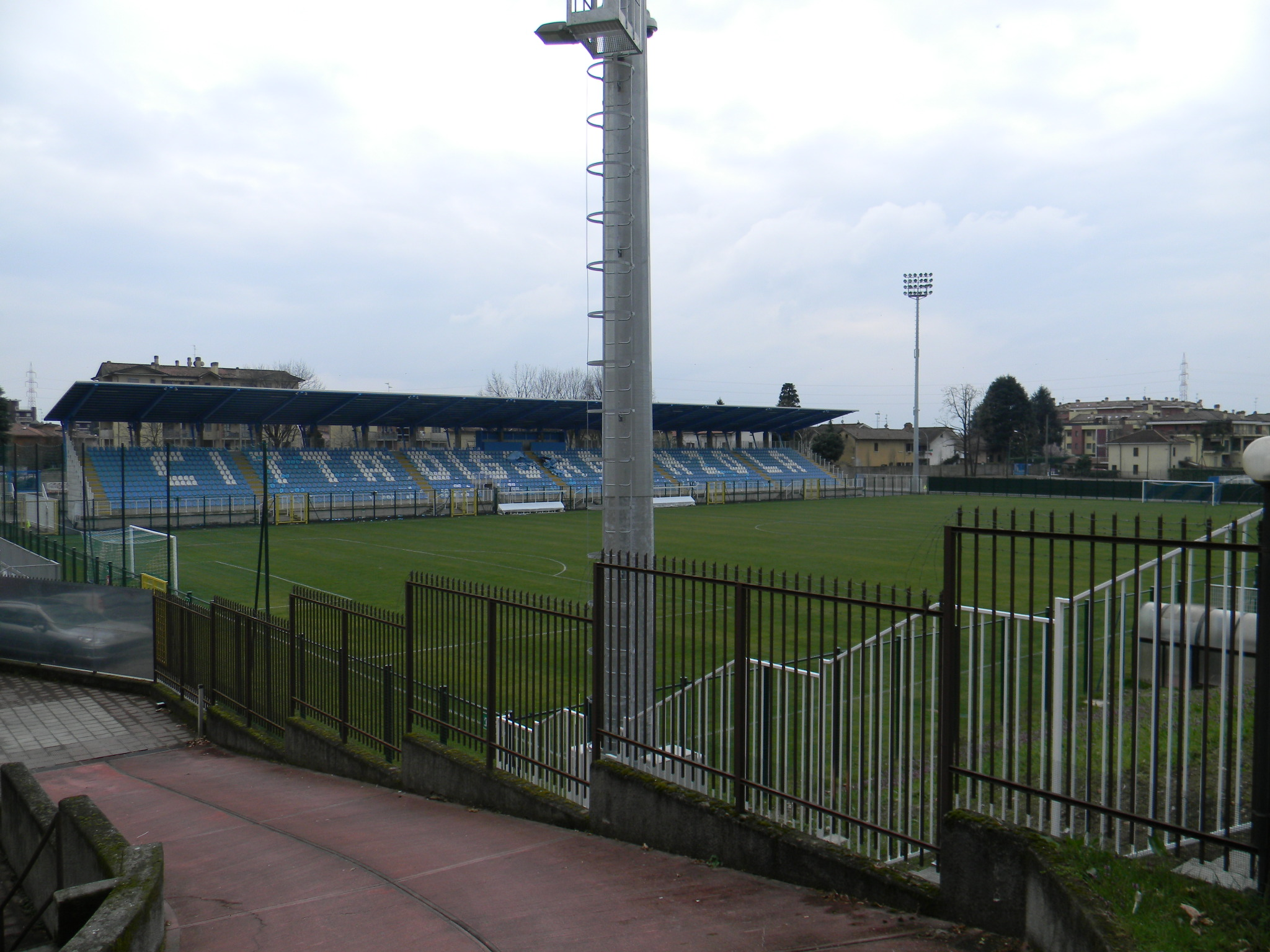
South Stand

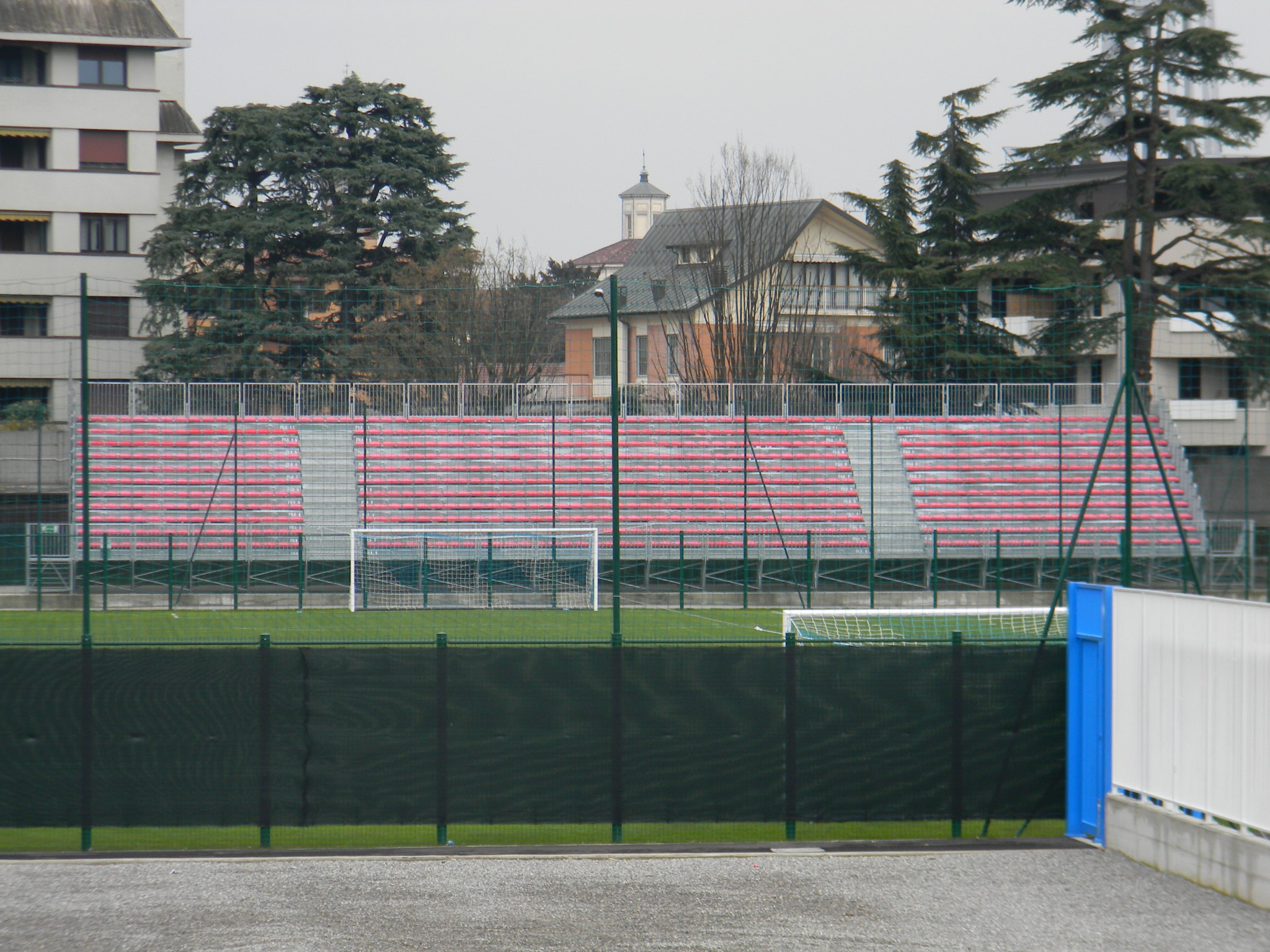
Away team fans stand

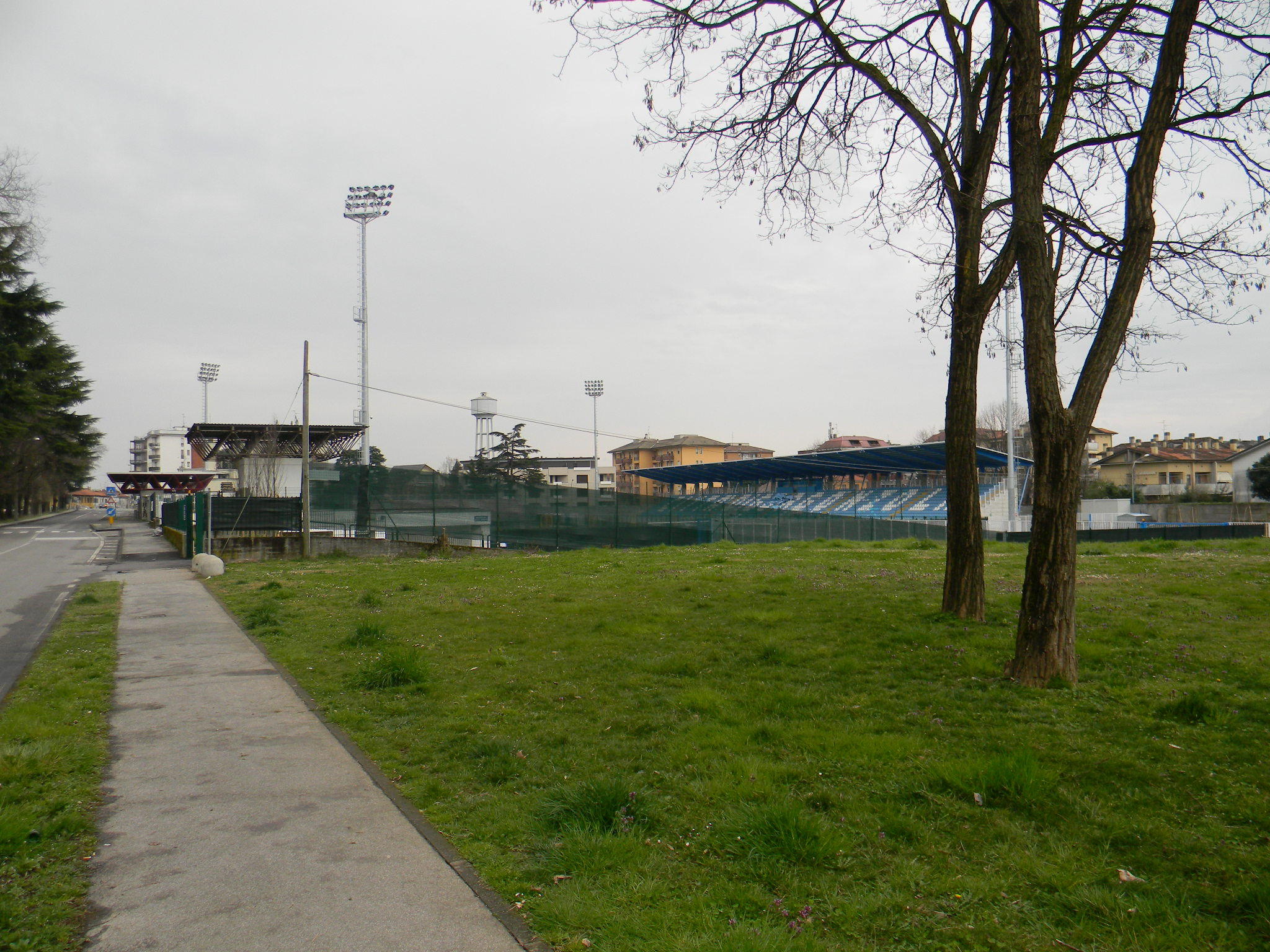
Stadium exterior panorama

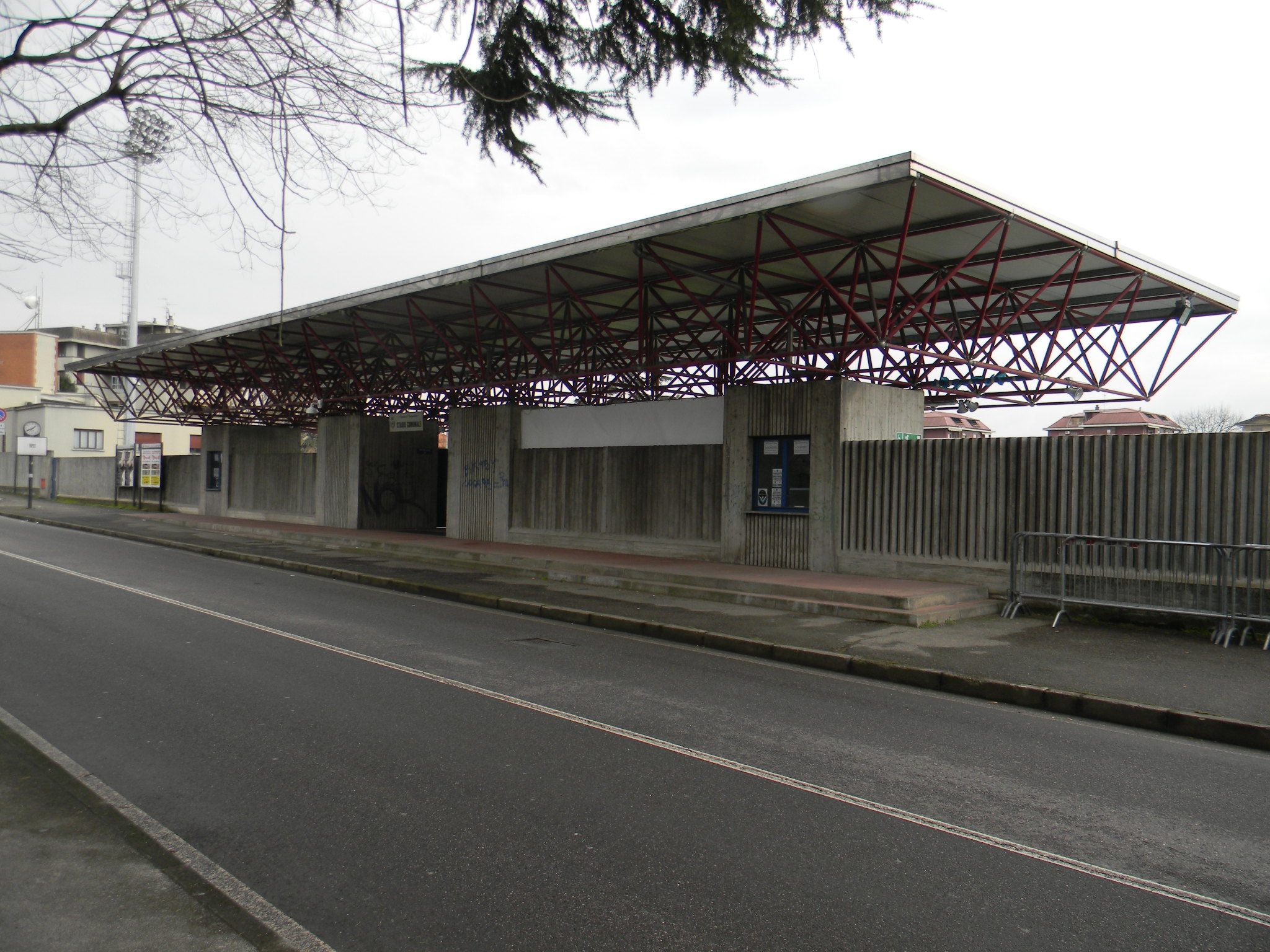
Exterior of the North Stand

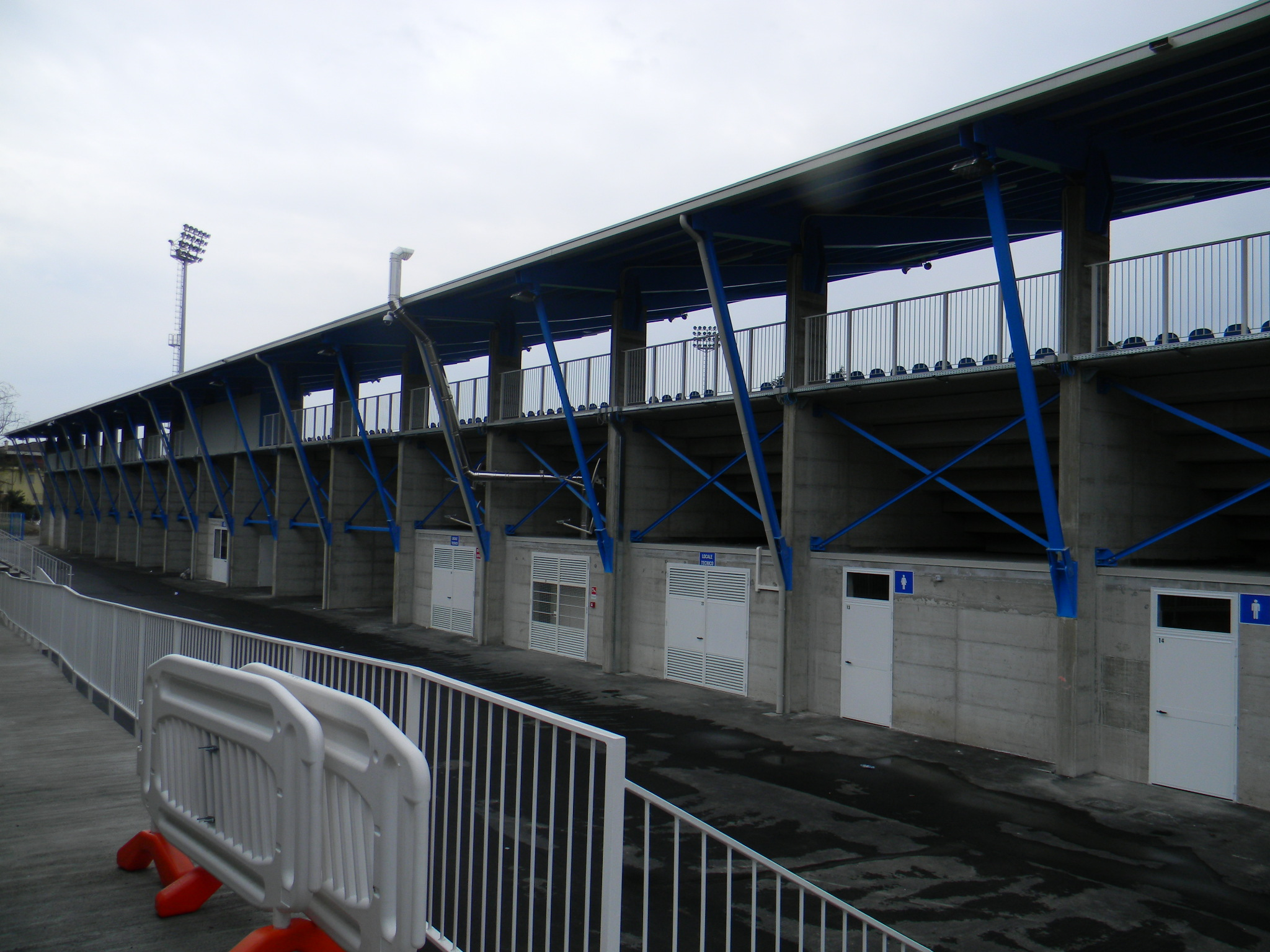
Exterior of the South Stand

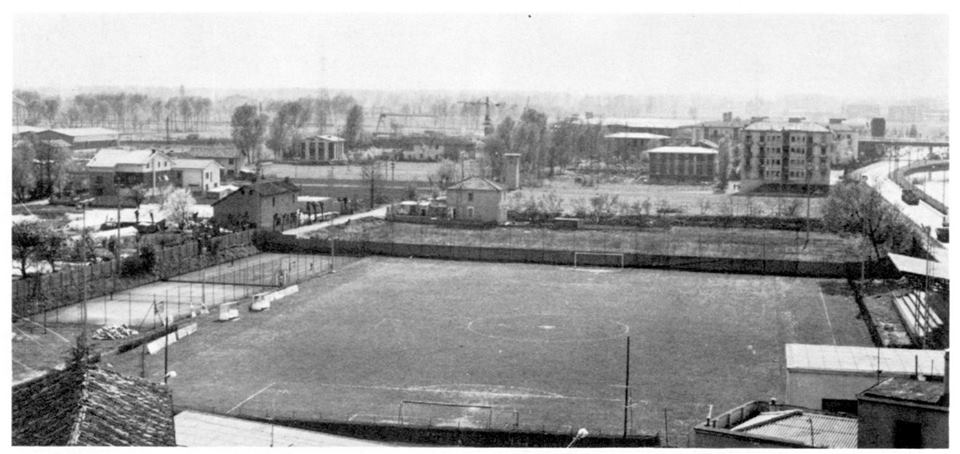
Stadium panorama in the 70's.
