= Matera 1933 =

Italian football club

Matera
- Full name: Football Club Matera; Società Sportiva Dilettantistica
- Nicknames: Biancazzurri, il Bue
- Founded: 1933
- Ground: Stadio XXI Settembre - Franco Salerno, Matera, Italy
- Capacity: 7,490
- Chairman: ?
- Manager: ?
- 2024–25: Serie D 6th
- Website: www.fcmatera.it
Home colours	Away colours	Third colours

Football Club Matera, more commonly known as Matera, is an Italian football club society based in the city of Matera.

The first city club, named U.S. Matera, was founded in 1933. During its history, the team went through several bankruptcies and re-establishments. In September 2022, it retook the name and logo of FC Matera.

== History ==
During 1926 and in the following years, the "Matheola Football Club", a team of the Opera Nazionale Dopolavoro of Matera, faced teams from nearby centres, sometimes with formations of 7 players per team, mainly using the "Campo delle Three Ways". An intense football and sporting ferment spreads in the city, which had just become the provincial capital. The first official football club in Matera was founded in the Federation Sports Office in Via La Vista on 5 September 1933 with the name of "Unione Sportiva Matera" and maroon colours; on 28 January 1934, on the occasion of the first official home match of the 1933–34 championship against Bitonto, the new Sports Field was inaugurated, later the "Luigi Razza" sports field, which became the "XXI Settembre" Stadium after the war. After having participated in a Third Division championship, Matera participated in the regional championship of the Second Division of Puglia, the highest regional championship of the time, later called First Division, starting from 1935–36. The club, which transformed itself into the Associazione Sportiva Materana in the 1936–37 championship, remained the city's highest expression of football until the Second World War. During the war, Matera was the only non-Apulian team to participate in the 1944 CONI Cup, a competition played in Puglia liberated by the Allied forces, while in the 1944–45 Apulian mixed tournament, they withdrew at the end of the first round.

In 1950 Matera Calcio, despite having finished in ninth place in the previous Apulian First Division championship, was admitted for the first time to an interregional championship, the Promozione (corresponding to the current Serie D), managed by the Southern Interregional League. At the end of the season, Matera were relegated and competed in the Apulian First Division championship. Still, despite coming first in group B, they were not classified as they had been officially registered in the Apulian championship by the F.I.G.C. for proximity reasons. He was therefore admitted to the new Lucanian Promotion championship, winning it in 1953 and returning to the interregional category, which in the meantime changed its name to IV Series, where he participated for five consecutive seasons. At the end of the 1957-58 season, Matera Calcio, after relegation to the Lucanian First Category, was excluded from the federal roles, so the first city team became Libertas Matera. In 1963, from the merger between Libertas and Acli Piccianello, the FootBall Club Matera was born, which two years later won its group and the semi-finals of the Lucanian First Category championship, and became Lucanian champion of the First Category by renunciation of Libertas Invicta Potenza.

Starting from 1965, the year of the return to Serie D, the person who, succeeding Riziero Zaccagnini, would be the president of the F.B.C. appeared on the scene. Matera for 22 years, Franco Salerno, who later also became Senator of the Republic, who will bring the blue and white club in the seventies to its highest levels ever. After three years in Serie D, Matera won the championship in 1967–68 ahead of Savoia and reached Serie C for the first time, relegating to Serie D in 1975 and returning to Serie C after a year. In 1978 the restructuring of the C series took place and Matera was admitted to the newly created C1 Series.

=== Serie B ===
Following the first C1 series championship in history in the 1978-1979 season, under the guidance of president Franco Salerno, after whom the XXI Settembre Stadium was subsequently named, and coach Franco Dibenedetto (awarded that year with the Seminatore d'oro as best Serie C coach), the city of Matera reached Serie B for the first and only time in its history by winning on the last day against Lucchese.

Despite some prestigious results and a good first round that ended in 14th place in the safety zone in Serie B 1979–80 season, Matera collapsed in the second half; a double relegation from B to C2 followed, the year in which the Ballarin fire also occurred on the last day before the match between Sambenedettese and Matera. In the second half of the eighties, Matera experienced a second double relegation, moving from C2 to the Promotion championship.

As a consequence of this, the members of the F.C. Matera decided to carry out a corporate merger with the other Matera team, Pro Matera, a club active in the Interregional, giving life to Pro Matera Sport, which later became Matera Sport. In 1991 Matera won the interregional championship and then won promotion to C2 in the decisive play-off against Gangi, winning 2–0 at home and drawing 0–0 in Gangi, Sicily. Later he will also win the Jacinto Trophy, a precursor tournament to the current Amateur Scudetto (established since 1992) played between the six winners of the promotion play-offs; beating Aosta 1–0 in the final in Bovalino, Matera then became Interregional Italian Champions.

In 1992-1993 Matera finished the Serie C2 championship in third place and was returned to C1, where it returned after 12 years in the 1993–94 season. At the end of the season, however, due to administrative irregularities, Matera suffered a relegation to C2. Despite the corporate vicissitudes that led to the bankruptcy of Matera Sport and the subsequent birth of Polisportiva Matera, in the 1995–96 season the white and blue team played in a Serie C2 championship. With the new name it played another good championship in C2 before being condemned for the second time in three years to another relegation due to problems relating to the bank guarantee required for registration in the championship. Polisportiva Matera, in protest against the relegation and economic difficulties, played the 1997-98 National Amateur Championship with the junior team, finishing second to last in group H with only 6 points and ahead of only Lagonegro.

In 1998, the Materasassi Sports Association was born from the merger between Atletico Matera and Scanzano, chaired by the lawyer Vitantonio Ripoli, who acquired the right to participate in the regional Eccellenza tournament. In the 1998–99 Eccellenza Lucana championship there was therefore a derby between Materasassi and Polisportiva Matera (which in the meantime changed its name several times, coexisting with the other city until its dissolution in 2001) and in the city of Sassi it returned to play a derby forty-five years after the matches between Libertas and Matera Calcio.

In 1999–00 Materasassi, which in the previous season played at a regional level had come in third place by winning the Italian Amateur Basilicata Cup, won the Eccellenza championship and allowed Matera football to return to an interregional category after two years.

In the 2004–05 season, due to the usual lack of investors, it was the fans who guaranteed food and accommodation to the players thanks to real spontaneous collections of money which continued until the entry into the club of the two new Barbano members and Padula. Despite the economic difficulties, in the 2004–05 and 2005–06 seasons Matera somehow managed to retain Serie D thanks to victories in the play-outs.

=== Coppa Italia Serie D ===
In the 2009–10 season Matera won the Coppa Italia Serie D and the promotion playoffs in 2009-10 Serie D, and was admitted to 2010-11 Lega Pro Seconda Divisione where it ranks 7th.

In the summer of 2011 the club did not register for the subsequent Second Division championship and was thus excluded from the professional championships due to financial defaults. In the 2011–12 season the FIGC Provincial Committee authorizes the Football Club Matera to restart from the Third Category Provincial Championship.

=== Matera Calcio ===
In the following season Matera did not enter any championship, failing. However, in 2012 the entrepreneur Saverio Columella completed the registration of a new football club in the Serie D championship: A.S.D. Matera Calcio. In 2014 the club returned to the third level of Italian football, changing its name to S.S. Matera Calcio. It reached the Lega Pro play-off in 2014–15 and 2016–17 and the Coppa Italia Lega Pro final in 2017. In August 2018, Matera Calcio was taken over by the Matera entrepreneur Nicola Andrisani and the lawyer Vitantonio Ripoli, already president in the early 2000s. Rosario Lamberti, entrepreneur from Avellino took over from them. On 14 February 2019 it was excluded from the Serie C championship after four withdrawals, and subsequently excluded from federal roles.

=== USD Matera Calcio 2019 ===
The club was refounded in 2019 as U.S.D. Matera Calcio 2019 and resumed from Seconda Categoria. In 2021 it merged with A.S.D. Grumentum Val d'Agri and transformed into U.S.D. Matera Grumentum, winning the Lucanian Eccellenza championship. In September 2022 the club retook the name and logo of FC Matera.

In 2022–23, after an extremely difficult start under the guidance of coach Finamore, who decided to resign in the month of October, with the appoint of mister Ciullo the biancazzurri managed to climb back up the table with a series of consecutive useful results, up to hope for a place in the playoffs. The season ends in 7th place, after having largely achieved the primary objective of salvation.

== Colors and badge ==
The colors of Matera Calcio are white and blue deriving from the city's coat of arms. At the time of the founding of the first city football team, from which Matera Calcio derives, the maroon was initially chosen as the social color. In the 1967-1968 season, the white jersey with a blue diagonal made its debut, which would later become the classic Matera jersey.

== Stadium ==
Matera plays its home games at the Stadio XXI Settembre-Franco Salerno, the largest stadium in the Basilicata region. Its construction was completed in 1933 and it was initially called Campo Sportivo Luigi Razza; after the war the name was changed to Stadio XXI Settembre to commemorate 21 September 1943, the date of the Matera massacre. Finally, on 16 June 2001, the stadium was co-named after Franco Salerno, president of the Matera Football Club who won Serie B in the 1979-80 season (the last time a football team from Basilicata was in the cadet). Precisely in 1979, on the occasion of that promotion, the stadium was renovated, with the construction of the two curves and the steps, the latter replacing the old one that was made of Innocenti tubes and of much smaller dimensions, while the central grandstand dates back to the early fifties and the side stands to 1968; the total capacity of the stadium was thus increased to about 15,000 seats, progressively reduced over the following years for reasons of security and public order.

== Notable former players ==
- (Italy) Luigi De Canio
- (Italy) Francesco Mancini
- (Croatia) Dragutin Ristić
- (Italy) Fernando Veneranda
- (Italy) Giovanni Di Lorenzo

== Honours ==
- Coppa Italia Serie D
  - Winners: 2009–10
