= Siracusa Calcio 1924 =

Association football club in Italy

Siracusa
- Full name: Siracusa Calcio 1924
- Nicknames: Azzurri (All-Blues), Aretusei
- Founded: 1 April 1924 (as Circolo Sportivo Tommaso Gargallo); 1937 (as Associazione Sportiva Siracusa); 1996 (as Unione Sportiva Siracusa); 2013 (as Siracusa Calcio); 2019 (as Siracusa); 2022 (as Siracusa Calcio 1924)
- Ground: Stadio Nicola De Simone, Syracuse
- Capacity: 5,946
- Chairman: Alessandro Ricci
- Manager: Vacant
- League: Serie D
- 2025–26: Serie C Group C, 19th of 20 (relegated)
| Home colours | Away colours |

Siracusa Calcio 1924, commonly referred to as Siracusa, is an Italian football club based in Syracuse, Sicily. (Italian: Siracusa, Sicilia) The club currently plays in Serie D.

== History ==
The earliest association football club in the Aretusean city was the Ortigia Sport Club, established in 1907. Two years later, the club participated in the Lipton Challenge Cup, a prestigious football tournament in Southern Italy, reaching the semi-final on 10 April 1909, in Palermo. There, they faced the local Palermo Football Club, losing 4–2. Notably, Ortigia had initially been awarded a forfeit victory due to Palermo fielding professional players, a violation of the era's regulations. Nevertheless, the match proceeded as a friendly. Apart from occasional provincial appearances, little is recorded of the island club thereafter, with its definitive dissolution coinciding with the outbreak of World War I.

=== The 1920s ===
It was not until after the post-war period, in the early 1920s, that new clubs emerged: in 1922, the Polisportiva Siracusana was founded, alongside the Sporting Club Santa Lucia, established by sailor Giuseppe Barcio. The latter's existence proved short-lived, disbanding after just one year. In 1923, additional local teams were formed, primarily neighborhood-based, engaging in amateur street tournaments. Among these, the blues of Esperia (from Ortygia) and the yellow-and-reds of Insuperabile (from Borgata Santa Lucia, mainland Syracuse) stood out, divided by intense local rivalry that extended to the football pitch. That same year, the Circolo Sportivo Tommaso Gargallo was founded, named after the Syracusan poet.

Among these, the Polisportiva Siracusana activated its football section with the 75th Infantry Regiment team, comprising soldiers stationed in Syracuse, including lieutenant Genesio Pioletti. Also noteworthy is the Siracusa Football Club, arguably the most direct precursor to modern Siracusa, sporting a white-and-green checkered kit. Active between 1924 and 1925 as a multi-sport organization, it organized the 1925 city student championships in football, high jump, long jump, sprinting, and middle-distance running.

==== 1 April 1924: A turning point ====
Official debut

Friendly match

Syracuse, Autumn 1924
Campo Coloniale

Tommaso Gargallo Siracusa vs. Centurion
1 – 6

- Scorer for Gargallo:
- Pioletti

The evening of 1 April 1924, marked a pivotal moment for Syracuse football: the merger of Esperia, Insuperabile, and the 75th Infantry's football section into the Circolo Sportivo Tommaso Gargallo, orchestrated and sponsored by Luigi Santuccio and Genesio Pioletti. This unification stemmed from a quadrangular tournament organized by a Gargallo representative, featuring the aforementioned teams. Gargallo triumphed, defeating Ortigia's Esperia 9–0 in the final. Following the merger, the Gargallo family allocated 5,000 lire to establish the club's financial foundation.

The first official match of the newly fused Gargallo Siracusa occurred in autumn 1924. Led by co-presidents Salvatore Monteforte and Luigi Santuccio and coached by Genesio Pioletti, the team donned black jerseys as a tribute to the Fascist regime. They faced the Centurion, a team of English sailors from the battleship of the same name docked at Syracuse Port. The friendly, held at the Coloniale sports facility (now Via Augusto Von Platen), ended in a decisive 6–1 victory for the Channel side. Genesio Pioletti scored Gargallo's lone goal from a penalty kick. Accounts suggest the English team included players from the national squad, explaining their dominance.

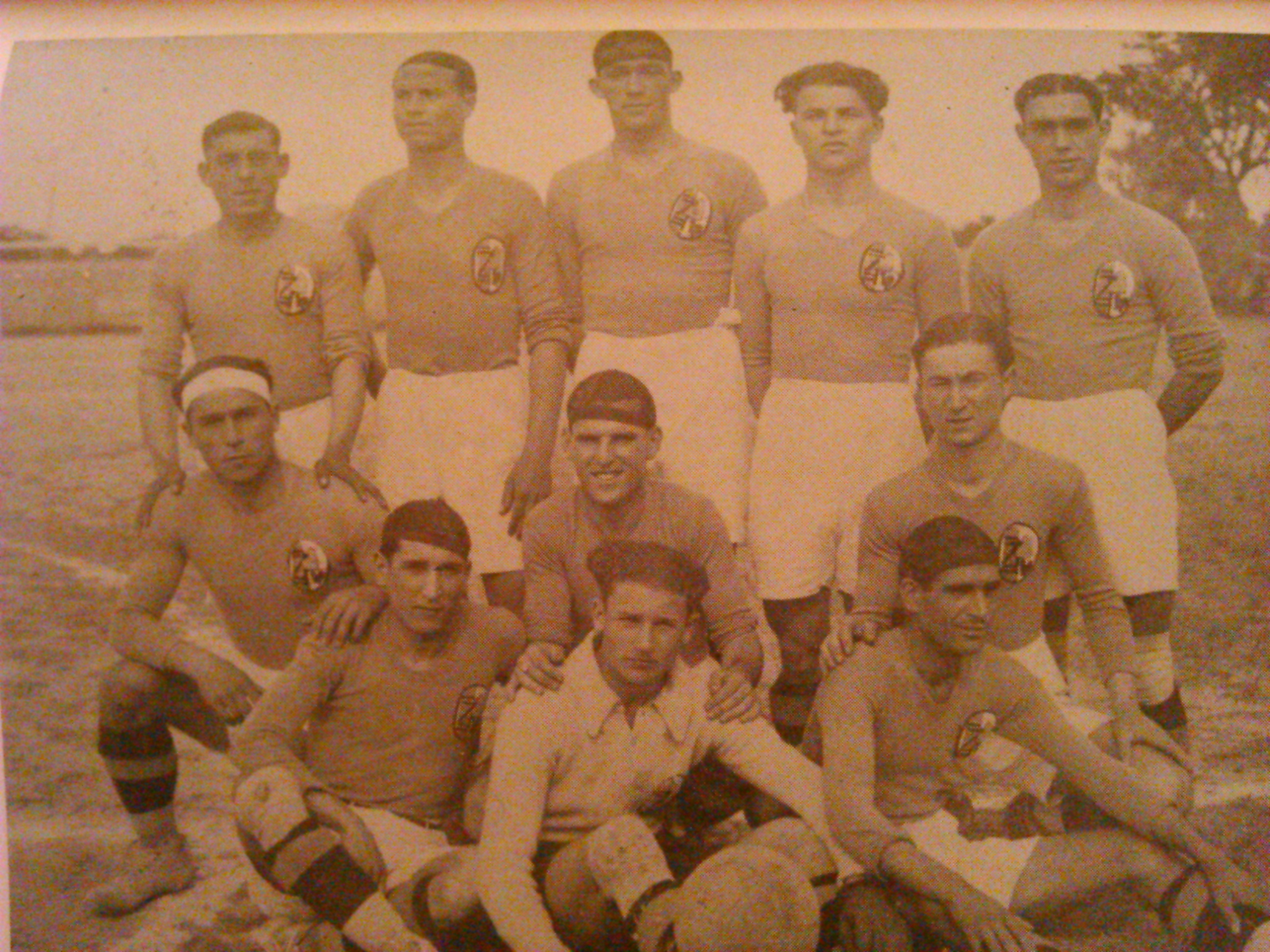
A Siracusa lineup from the 1928–1929 season

The club's first victory came in 1925 at the Coloniale, defeating Megara Augusta 1–0 in a derby. The match was marred by violent clashes between players and an ensuing pitch invasion by spectators. Later, in a triangular tournament valid for the Seconda Divisione championship held in Syracuse, Siracusa faced rivals Juventus Catania and Catanese. On 7 June 1925, they defeated Juventus Catania 3–0, with a hat-trick from striker Cichero. The following week, on 14 June, they overcame Catanese 2–1, with goals from Pioletti and Bagnoli. Around this time, Gargallo played its first city derby against Siracusa Football Club, a match that ended oddly: suspended at 1–0 for Siracusa after the white-and-greens abandoned the field in protest of a penalty awarded to Gargallo, which they deemed unjust.

In the 1925–1926 Seconda Divisione season (then akin to Serie B), Gargallo joined a Sicilian-Calabrian group, facing derbies against Stadium Palermo, Umberto I Messina, and Reggio Football Club. They topped their group with 8 points. Over the next two seasons, now adorned in blue (their permanent color), the Gargallini solidified their local football movement in the downgraded Seconda Divisione (third tier), consistently finishing near the top. In the 1928–1929 Campionato Meridionale, Gargallo competed in a tough group against teams like Palermo, Nocerina, and Salernitana, ultimately winning their group with 15 points and earning promotion to Prima Divisione. This season also marked the end of Genesio Pioletti's era, leaving an enduring legacy as both player and coach in Syracuse's football history.

In the 1929–1930 Prima Divisione—now the third tier of Italian football—Tommaso Gargallo underwent a coaching change, with Mario Piselli replacing Pioletti. Placed in Group D with 14 other teams, the club finished sixth, signaling significant progress and the beginning of an important chapter for Syracuse football.

=== The 1930s ===
Between 1930 and 1932, the club underwent two name changes: first to Società Sportiva Syracusae, under Hungarian Róbert Winkler—the Blues' first foreign coach—who led them to their first official derby win against Catania (2–1, thanks to a brace from Alberto Macchi and Antal Mally); then to Società Sportiva Siracusa, which twice narrowly missed promotion to Serie B. Starting in the 1930–1931 Prima Divisione (today's third tier), they remained in the second tier until the 1934–1935 season. In their debut year, they finished ninth, securing survival. In the second, third, and fourth years, the team excelled: third place behind Salernitana and Messina in the first; first place, tied with Catanzarese, in the second, but losing 1–0 in a playoff on 7 May 1933, in Naples; and second place in the third, four points behind leaders Catania, advancing to the promotion finals but finishing second in Group C, three points shy of Lucchese. In their fifth year, financial woes and a one-point penalty plagued the season, culminating in the club's withdrawal, confirmed by a telegram from directors Innorta, Carnazza, and Moscuzza.

==== 1937: Associazione Sportiva Siracusa ====
On 27 March 1935, after their final forfeiture, the Direttorio Divisioni Superiori expelled Società Sportiva Siracusa from its ranks. After two years of efforts, the Associazione Sportiva Siracusa was founded in 1937 (exact date uncertain, likely between 1936 and 1937) with federal registration number 49470. Spearheaded by local enthusiasts, including president Pier Luigi Romano and coach Fioravante Lenzi, the club entered the Sicilian championship. They dominated, securing promotion to the newly formed Serie C for the 1938–1939 season. This sparked an exciting cycle, lasting into the 1940s, with consecutive second-place finishes from 1938 to 1940, narrowly missing promotion.

On 18 September 1938, Siracusa debuted in Serie C, drawing 0–0 at home against Lecce, and consistently exceeded expectations, finishing high alongside teams like Messina, Brindisi, and Taranto. That year, they entered the 1938–1939 Coppa Italia, but were eliminated in the first round via forfeit for failing to appear against La Dominante. They redeemed themselves in the 1939–1940 Coppa Italia, unexpectedly advancing through all preliminary rounds (defeating Agrigento, Messina, Stabia, and Palermo), reaching the round of 16—their highest-ever achievement in the competition. On Christmas Eve 1939, they fell 4–2 to Brescia (a Serie B side) at Stadium, despite leading twice with Peresson's brace in the 6th and 28th minutes.

=== The 1940s ===
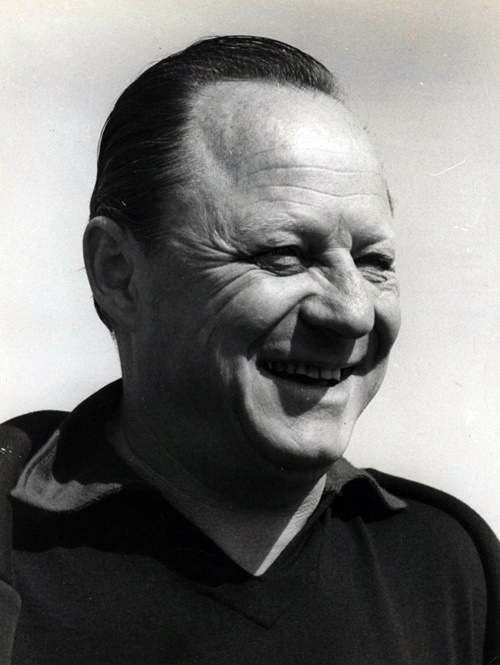
Giuseppe "Gipo" Viani, coach of the Blues in 1940–1941, later managed the Italian National Team from 1958 to 1960.

In the 1940–1941 season, coached by debutant Giuseppe Viani, Siracusa topped their Group H but faltered in the promotion quadrangular against Cavagnaro Genova, Prato, and Pro Patria, finishing third in Group A, one point shy of Serie B. They placed second in the next two seasons, delaying their promotion dream.

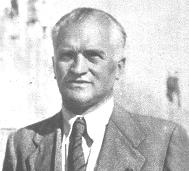
Engelbert König, Siracusa's first Serie B coach

The 1942–1943 Serie C season halted due to the Anglo-American landing in Sicily and World War II. Resuming in 1944, Siracusa—uniquely retaining its registration and history amid the forced dissolution of most Sicilian clubs during the island's "defascistization"—competed in the Wartime Sicilian Championship, organized by the Sicilian Sports Federation under the Sicilian Independence Movement. In the 1945–1946 Serie C, they climbed from fourth to third due to a restructured table, earning their first-ever Serie B promotion alongside Cosenza and Catanzaro.

==== 1946: Serie B debut ====
Siracusa debuted in Serie B on 22 September 1946, defeating Foggia 3–0 at home with a brace from Luciano Cavaleri (scoring Siracusa's first Serie B goal) and a goal from Dandolo Flumini. They remained in the second tier for seven consecutive seasons until 1952–1953, when a 0–0 draw against Piombino in a relegation showdown saw them drop by a single point. During this period, they played numerous derbies against Catania, Messina, and Palermo, and faced prestigious clubs like Genoa, Napoli, and Roma, amassing 258 points over 262 matches (102 wins, 55 draws, 105 losses), scoring 327 goals and conceding 369.

The roster for Siracusa's inaugural Serie B season included: (Goalkeepers) Remo Peroncelli (29), S. Nobile (2), S. Tragella (1); (Defenders) Fernando Casuzzi (29), V. Troiano (1), G. Vinci (1), G. Viverit (3); (Midfielders) Adelio Fiore (28), A. Correnti (23), U. Ambrogio (13), Guido Manfré (23), Guido Mazzetti (23), Giacomo Mele (25), M. Pala (30), Bruno Ziz (17); (Forwards) G. Busoni (4), S. Cambisi (1), D. Carussio (1), Luciano Cavaleri (22), A. Chiarenza (15), Dandolo Flumini (29), C. Nobile (11), G. Rizzo (15), R. Salvo (1).

Under Austrian Engelbert König (later replaced by Guido Mazzetti), Siracusa finished their first Serie B season in 12th place, avoiding relegation by one point. Over the next three years, they achieved strong results, notably a fifth-place finish in 1947–1948 alongside Empoli. Subsequent seasons saw fluctuating mid-table performances. Striker Bruno Micheloni emerged as the club's top scorer, finishing as Serie B's second-leading scorer in his debut season with 22 goals, behind Ettore Bertoni of Brescia.

=== The 1950s ===
In the 1950–1951 season, the team matched their best-ever Serie B finish from 1947–1948. However, three years later, they returned to Serie C, relegated on the final day, 31 May 1953, after a 0–0 draw at home against Piombino, who held a one-point advantage.

Freshly relegated to Serie C, Siracusa retained most of their roster for the 1953–1954 season, hoping for a swift return to Serie B. This ambition went unfulfilled, with the team securing survival on the last day and settling into mid-table finishes. In the 1956–1957 season, they faced relegation to Serie D for the first time, only to be spared by Pavia's withdrawal from the following season.

The next year, expanded regional groups (North, Center and South) eliminated relegations, a boon for Siracusa. Coached again by Mario Perazzolo, they finished 12th in a stable campaign. The 1958–1959 season, also without relegations, saw clubs focus on youth development. Siracusa finished second-to-last, spotlighting youngsters like Pulvirenti (6 goals) and Franzò (5 goals). In 1959–1960, under Oronzo Pugliese, they achieved a fifth-place finish and an unbeaten home record.

=== The 1960s ===
The 1960s saw Siracusa, coached by Čestmír Vycpálek (uncle of Zdeněk Zeman and a former Palermo and Juventus star), nearly return to Serie B. In 1960–1961, they fell short, overtaken by Trapani—who clinched promotion with a 2–1 win over Siracusa in the penultimate match—and Cosenza. This season marked the debut of their first foreign player, Uruguayan Washington Cacciavillani, dubbed El Chico by fans. Subsequent seasons were unremarkable, with Rocco Testa and Ettore Casini shining amid coaching changes, including Egizio Rubino, Sandro Puppo (a pioneer of zone defense in Italy), and Ettore Mannucci, narrowly avoiding relegation battles.

Relegation to the amateur division arrived in 1967–1968, ending a 31-year run in Serie B and C, marking the end of Sgarlata's presidency and the rise of Angelo Genovese. In three Serie D seasons (then equivalent to Serie C2), Siracusa faced new provincial derbies against Avola, Floridia, Leonzio, and Netina.

=== The 1970s ===
After finishing third and tenth in their first two Serie D seasons, the 1970–1971 season saw a managerial shift. Graziano Verzotto, a Veneto-born Christian Democrat secretary who relocated to Syracuse, took over the club. Under his leadership, Siracusa battled Cantieri Navali Palermo for the top spot. Both teams tied for first place, leading to playoffs at Celeste in Messina (0–0) and Collana in Naples (1–1). After extra time, Siracusa won promotion via a coin toss, returning to Serie C after three years.

In 1971–1972, Siracusa's return to the third tier saw the debut of Amedeo Crippa, who became a club legend with 462 appearances over 14 consecutive seasons. The Blues excelled in 1974–1975 (when they adopted the name Siracusa Calcio) and 1976–1977, coached by Gennaro Rambone and Ulderico Sacchella. Under president Luigi Foti, they vied for Serie B, leading the table multiple times, including after a 2–0 home win over Bari on 31 October 1976. However, the 1975–1976 season was turbulent, with legal issues forcing president Graziano Verzotto to flee Italy, leaving his wife Maria Nicotra in charge.

==== 1979: Championship and Coppa Italia Semiprofessionisti ====
Siracusa vs. Biellese 1–0

June 17, 1979 – Stadio Nicola De Simone, Syracuse – Coppa Italia Semiprofessionisti Final

Siracusa: Bellavia, Favero, Restivo, Agosti, Belfiore, Crippa, Petraccini, Biasiolo, Biagetti (70' Lo Russo), De Pasquale, Ballarin.
Coach: Facchin

Biellese: Reali, Francisetti, Braghin, Borghi, Capozucca, Sadocco, Schilirò, Conforto, Lamia Caputo, Palese (75' Pellerei), Enzo.
Coach: Gori

Referee: Altobelli from Rome.

Attendance: 8,000

Scorer: 87' Ballarin (S).

In 1977–1978, with Serie C splitting into Serie C1 and Serie C2, Siracusa, failing to finish in the top eight, dropped to the new fourth tier. Undeterred, they built a strong squad, bolstered by players like Walter Ballarin (a double-digit scorer), Giorgio Biasiolo (former player of AC Milan), Ubaldo Biagetti, and Luciano Favero—nicknamed the three Bs for their outstanding performances. The 1978–1979 season was triumphant, with Siracusa winning their group and the Coppa Italia Semiprofessionisti on 17 June 1979, defeating Biellese 1–0 at home with Ballarin's goal. Ballarin finished as the group's top scorer with 17 goals. Siracusa became the first Sicilian club to win a trophy, a feat later matched only by Palermo in 1993.

==== 30 May 1979: The death of Nicola De Simone ====
The season's joy was overshadowed by the death of defender Nicola De Simone, hospitalized in Naples after a severe on-field collision during an away match in Palma Campania. He died after 17 days in a coma. On 3 June 1979, his funeral in Castellammare di Stabia—attended by Siracusa fans en route to Sorrento—sparked a lasting bond between the Juve Stabia and Syracuse fanbases, rooted in De Simone's birthplace and adopted city. Soon after, Syracuse's stadium was named in his honor.

In their first 1979–1980 Serie C1 season, Siracusa retained much of their prior squad, adding Sergio D'Agostino alongside Ballarin in attack, who together scored 16 goals. They finished seventh, securing safety early, and briefly led the table until a 0–1 home loss to Catania on 25 November 1979.

=== The 1980s ===
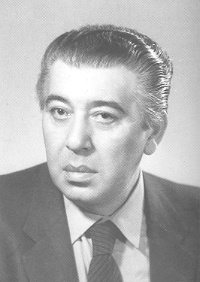
Siracusa president Luigi Foti

The 1980–1981 Serie C1 season began with high hopes and a record 2,000+ season tickets, but ended disastrously in second-to-last place above Turris with 23 points. Four coaches—Carlo Facchin, Nicola Chiricallo, Bruno Pesaola, and Paolo Lombardo—cycled through, and Siracusa slid back to Serie C2. They languished there for nearly a decade, marked by managerial upheaval and lackluster campaigns, except for the 1982–1983 season, when they vied for promotion with Messina and Akragas, falling four points short.

From 1986, after the bankruptcy of Siracusa Calcio, the club reverted to the name Associazione Sportiva Siracusa, retaining registration number 49470 and their league status under president Giuseppe "Pippo" Imbesi. The first two seasons were solid, both ending in sixth place.

The 1988–1989 season brought a breakthrough. With Imbesi retaining coach Paolo Lombardo and much of the squad (featuring goalkeeper Davide Torchia and midfielder Pasquale Marino), Siracusa edged out Cavese for second place and promotion. They clinched it with a 3–1 win over Lodigiani before a packed Nicola De Simone stadium (over 10,000 fans), with goals from Pannitteri, Mezzini, and Martin.

In 1989–1990, Siracusa retained most of their roster, adding striker Girolamo Bizzarri and midfielder Primo Maragliulo from Casertana. The team secured a comfortable 10th-place finish, with Francesco Pannitteri shining as the group's second-top scorer with 15 goals.

=== The 1990s ===
The 1990–91 season brought several changes: the arrival of a new coach, Adriano Cadregari, and the transfer of several players to Sicily, including defender David Balleri, former Inter striker Amerigo Paradiso, talented midfielder Oreste Didonè, and Valerio Mazzucato. The Aretuseans finished the season in tenth place, having beaten Palermo (3–2 at home) and Catania (a historic 4–1 at the Cibali).

In the following season, after signing the acrobatic Roman striker Fabio Lucidi (who would later make headlines), Siracusa struggled in the lower reaches of the standings, unexpectedly culminating in relegation at the end of the season. This marked the beginning of a delicate phase for the club, plagued by financial difficulties. However, they were reinstated to the third tier due to an alleged sporting irregularity by Licata, which led to their relegation instead. Another drop followed in the 1992–1993 season, sealed after the final home match against Monopoli—despite a 2–1 win. Fortune smiled again that summer, as numerous cancellations of southern Italian clubs (including regional rivals Catania and Messina) allowed Siracusa to be spared once more, narrowly allowing them to stay in the division.

That same season, on 25 April 1993, an incident indirectly involved Siracusa—an illicit sporting event during the Siracusa-Perugia match. Investigators confirmed direct responsibility from Perugia president Luciano Gaucci (also an owner of a horse racing stable), who "donated" a horse to the father-in-law of the appointed referee, Emanuele Senzacqua, and dined with him three days prior. The match ended 1–1 amid controversy and fierce protests, with Siracusa taking the lead via Marcellino and Perugia equalizing through Michele Gelsi's free kick.

In the next season, salvation was secured on the pitch via play-outs, overcoming Nola (a 1–0 loss in Nola, followed by a 2–0 win in Syracuse). During the campaign, Siracusa played the provincial derby against Leonzio, triumphing 5–1 at home but losing 1–0 in Lentini.

The 1994–1995 season saw Siracusa, under Giuliano Sonzogni and athletic trainer Feliciano Di Blasi, lead the table with a perfect record after ten rounds, vying for promotion. Their stint at the top was short-lived due to a negative streak, losing the lead to Reggina after a 0–2 home defeat in a direct clash at De Simone. Financial instability forced the sale of key players like Leonardo Colucci to Lazio to raise funds. Despite these challenges, Sonzogni's squad not only completed the season but stayed in the upper echelons, finishing fifth in their group—just one point ahead of Nola. This secured a play-off spot, clinched amid struggles until the final matchday on 28 May 1995, a 0–0 draw against an Empoli side coached by Luciano Spalletti, aided by Casarano's simultaneous win over Nola, a direct rival. Competing for promotion in the final play-off standings were Avellino, Gualdo, and regional rivals Trapani (two points ahead of Siracusa), coached by Ignazio Arcoleo.

The play-off grid pitted Siracusa against Avellino. Promotion to Serie B offered a financial lifeline. The first leg, played at Granillo in Reggio Calabria due to De Simone's inadequacy, saw the Blues prevail 2–1 over the Irpinians (goals by Scaringella and Logarzo), cheered by 5,000 Aretusean supporters. The return leg, in a hostile and intimidating atmosphere, ended in a 1–0 defeat, ousting Siracusa from the play-offs. A month later, the club was expelled from the league. Bankruptcy was declared by the Syracuse Tribunal on 6 February 1996, resulting in the revocation of their affiliation and federal registration number 49470, erasing nearly 60 years of azure history.

==== 1995: Bankruptcy and Siracusa Marcozzi ====
Before the 1995–1996 Sicilian Promozione season, the historic Unione Sportiva Marcozzi Siracusa 1956 became the new Siracusa (temporarily renamed Siracusa Marcozzi), restarting in the regional second division with a squad mostly composed of local players. Coached by Floridia native Giovanni Grande (a former midfielder in the 1980s and a former member of Zeman's first Foggia team), they debuted on 17 September 1995, at De Simone before old and new fans, defeating Acate 2–0 with goals from Regina and Lo Iacono.

This season saw the Blues vie for the title against Scordia. A chance to overtake them came in the return leg at home, but despite the support of about 1,000 spectators, Siracusa drew 0–0, handing the championship to the Etneans by two points. Later, due to the city's large fan base, they were promoted to the Eccellenza League.

Over the next two years in Eccellenza, Siracusa first finished second but saw promotion hopes fade after losing the play-offs to Folgore Castelvetrano in a double defeat (away and home). The following year, president Lanza assembled a powerhouse, appointing Roman coach Mauro Zampollini (experienced in amateur leagues) and key players like Nino De Luca (a double-digit scorer and former Messina player) and Vincenzo Marchese (with Serie A experience at Cagliari). The Blues won the championship and the Coppa Italia Dilettanti Sicilia, largely thanks to De Luca and Marchese, who scored 38 of the team's 47 goals, restoring Syracuse football to a near-respectable level.

==== 12 January 1998: The death of Giorgio Di Bari ====
During these amateur years, a tragedy shook the azure fanbase. Former captain Giorgio Di Bari, a club icon from the 1980s and 1990s, died at 34 from a sudden heart attack while returning from training with his team at the time, Bisceglie, inside his car. The defender, Puglian by birth but Syracusan by adoption (married to a local with whom he had a son), remains among the club's most-capped players with 204 appearances. Thousands of azure fans attended his funeral at Syracuse Cathedral, paying tribute. The city of Syracuse honored him by naming a sports facility after him.

The 1998-1999 season, which began with the promise of winning the championship, started disastrously. The club officially became Unione Sportiva Siracusa, overhauling the roster that had excelled the prior year. A poor start saw coach Zampollini sacked by mid-season, replaced by Orazio Sorbello. Results remained elusive, and Siracusa languished at the bottom. The club recalled Zampollini, who had previously succeeded, but after a brief recovery, a string of losses led to direct relegation in last place—just a year after reaching the top amateur tier—ushering in one of the darkest periods in the city's football history.

=== The 2000s ===
After three years of ups and downs in the top regional league (with play-offs proving elusive), Siracusa returned to Serie D in August 2002, following a season under Giuseppe Strano where they finished second but lost the first play-off round 1–0 to Licata on neutral ground. Young striker Giovanni Abate, born in 1981, emerged as a standout, leading the Blues with goals and catching the eye of scouts. At the end of the season, Palermo (then in Serie B) signed him on a permanent basis.

From Serie D 2002–2003, Siracusa consistently competed at the top but fell short, reaching the play-offs five times in six years amid presidential changes—Lanza, Longo, and Luigi Salvoldi from 2005 to 2006.

The 2003–2004 season saw president Gabriele Lanza resign, handing the club to Tino Longo. His tenure was brief and mismanaged, leading to a sale to Syracusan entrepreneur Luigi Salvoldi. The 2004–2005 season under new management aimed for the title, hiring Floridia-born coach Gaetano Auteri and local striker Giovanni Pisano, a proven scorer in Serie B and C1. Finishing fourth, they reached the play-off final against Sapri. A packed De Simone saw Pisano score in the 89th minute for a 1–0 first-leg win, but a 3–1 loss in the return dashed promotion hopes.

In 2005–2006, with coach Bellinvia (ex-Sapri), the team lacked a competitive edge, costing the Messina native his job. Under youth coach Giancarlo Betta, Siracusa lost 6–5 on penalties in the play-off semi-final to Cosenza.

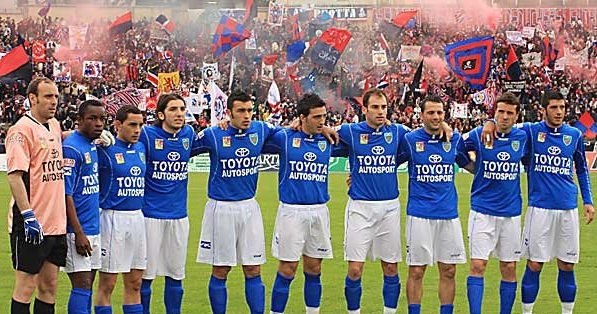
A 2007–2008 lineup

For 2006–2007, Domenico Giacomarro (ex-Paganese) was hired with much of his Pagani squad. Inconsistent results saw him sacked, replaced by veteran Paolo Lombardo. His methods lifted Siracusa to the play-offs, reaching the final but losing to Sibilla Bacoli, with play-offs again proving a curse.

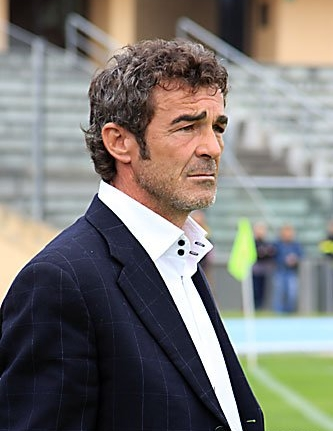
Coach Gaetano Auteri, the key to the promotion in 2009

In 2007–2008, Gaetano Auteri returned as coach, with Lombardo shifting to youth director and Nicola Pannone—a fan favorite—joining as sporting director. A fourth-place finish led to another play-off loss, but it laid the groundwork for a professional ascent.

The breakthrough came in 2008–2009, with Auteri leading a squad featuring prolific strikers Cosimo Sarli and Vincenzo Cosa. Siracusa topped the table with a record 81 points—17 ahead of second-placed Vico Equense—earning promotion to Lega Pro Seconda Divisione, the highest points total in their history.

In 2009–2010, marking a return to professional football after over a decade, Siracusa (ironically reuniting with coach Sonzogni, their last in the pro era) finished sixth, narrowly missing the play-offs. This summer, Siracusa was promoted to the Lega Pro Prima Divisione on 5 August 2010, following the bankruptcy of 22 clubs.

=== The 2010s ===
The 2010–2011 season marked Siracusa's return to the third tier after 15 years. New signings included Giovanni Abate (a former Siracusa player from 1998 to 2001), defender Giovanni Ignoffo, Argentine Fernando Spinelli, and midfielder Carmine Giordano. A shocking start—five losses, no goals—saw Giuseppe Romano replaced by Guido Ugolotti, who nearly reached the play-offs.

In 2011–2012, under Andrea Sottil, Siracusa hovered near the top. After briefly leading, unpaid debts led to a five-point penalty. Despite this, they finished third, entering the play-offs with a home advantage. Against Virtus Lanciano, a 1–0 away loss and a 2–2 home draw in a packed Nicola De Simone ended their promotion bid.

On 16 July 2012, president Luigi Salvoldi failed to secure the deposit for the next season due to financial woes, leading the Lega Pro board to exclude Siracusa from Prima Divisione. Unlike 1995, the club avoided bankruptcy but opted not to field a senior team, focusing on youth squads (Allievi and Giovanissimi).

==== 2012: Restart in Terza Categoria ====
A month after exclusion from Lega Pro Prima Divisione, in summer 2012, organized fans formed a people's ownership group, birthing Associazione Sportiva Dilettantistica Siracusa Calcio on 23 August, soon renamed A.S.D. Città di Siracusa for federal reasons, entering Terza Categoria. In this provincial league, Siracusa had to play against teams from nearby towns such as Lentini, Sortino, Portopalo, Solarino, Floridia, Villasmundo, Cassaro, and Belvedere for the first time. They won the championship (16 wins, 1 draw, 1 loss) and the Coppa delle Province, defeating Nuova Indipendente of Furci Siculo 4–1 in the final on 8 June 2013, in Santa Flavia, Palermo. A memorable away match was the 3–1 win on 6 January 2013, in Cassaro, an Hyblaean mountain village of 787 residents.

The following year, the club declined to participate in the Seconda Categoria as, on 25 June 2013, Syracusan entrepreneur Gaetano Cutrufo, then Palazzolo president, transferred the Eccellenza title, creating Sport Club Siracusa.

In their debut, 2013–2014 season, the reborn club struggled with a total squad overhaul and a disappointing start, prompting a coaching change (Pidatella sacked, replaced by veteran Strano). Finishing third, they reached the play-offs but lost the final to Misterbianco, ending promotion hopes.

==== 2014–2016: Cutrufo era and double promotion ====
Renamed A.S.D. Città di Siracusa for the 2014–2015 season, with Giuseppe Anastasi coaching, the team was built for the top, featuring veterans like ex-Catania player Giuseppe Mascara, recently with Pescara in Serie B. Leading the table, on 12 April 2015, a 2–0 win over San Pio X in the final round, coupled with Catania's draw in Barcellona Pozzo di Gotto, secured promotion to Serie D.

Returning to Serie D in the 2015–2016 season, the club bolstered its structure, appointing Simona Marletta (ex-Catania executive) as general manager and Giuseppe Antonino Laneri as technical director, returning after having succeeded under Salvoldi. Midfielder Davide Baiocco rejoined after 2011–2012. A rocky start saw Lorenzo Alacqua sacked, replaced by Andrea Sottil. Game by game, Siracusa climbed, taking the lead after a 3–1 win over Cavese on 6 December 2015. A tight race with Cavese and Frattese ended with promotion secured on the final day via a draw at Rende, returning to professional football (the new Lega Pro, Italy's third tier) after four years.

Entering the 2016–2017 season in the third-tier professional league, the club restructured on 14 June 2016, reverting to the 1970s name Siracusa Calcio. Management shifted: Marletta was replaced by Massimo Bandiera (ex-Cosenza), then Giancarlo Cutrufo (president Gaetano's brother) after Bandiera's family-related exit; sporting director Finocchiaro was succeeded by Antonello Laneri. Facing a tough group with powerhouses like Lecce, Foggia, Taranto, Catania, Messina, Cosenza, and Reggina, Siracusa struggled early, earning three points in seven games. They recovered, ending the first half just outside the play-out zone. Home derbies against Catania and Messina were highlights: a 1–0 win over Catania (for the first time since 6 April 1952, 3–1) via Filippo Scardina, and a 2–0 victory over Messina (first professional win since 13 March 1977) with Emanuele Catania's brace, marking his 30th goal in the azure jersey.

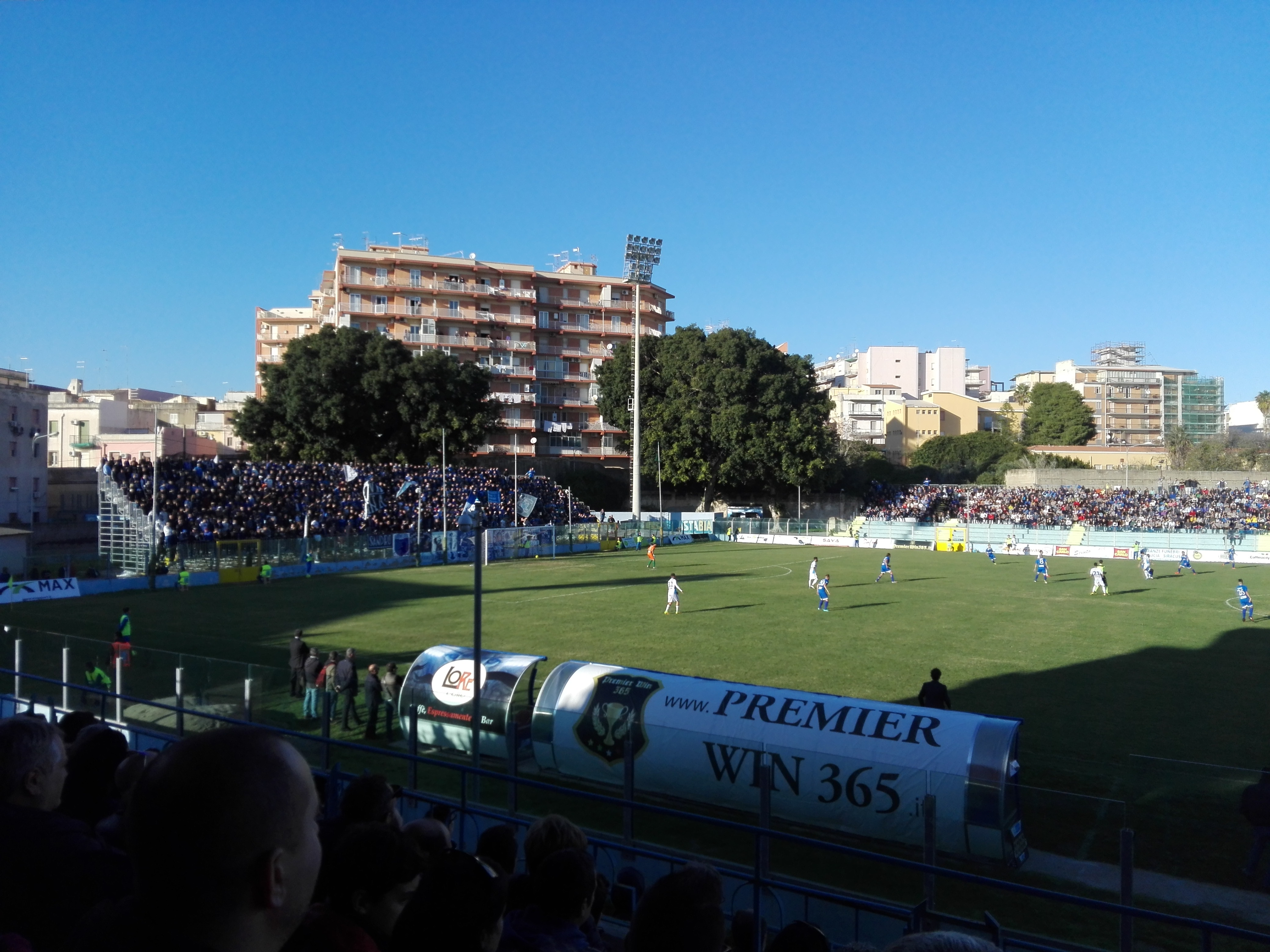
10 December 2016: Siracusa beats Catania at home after 64 years

In the second half, a high point average stabilized their play-off spot. Five consecutive wins secured sixth place early, with a 2–1 win at Cosenza on 9 April 2017, tying them with Juve Stabia for fourth—the season's best. Finishing sixth, they hosted Casertana in a single play-off match. Despite two favorable outcomes, a 0–2 loss ended their promotion dream, though the season exceeded expectations.

On 1 June 2017, Giuseppe Iodice, with 30 years' experience (ex-Napoli, Salernitana), signed as general manager. On 13 June, Andrea Sottil mutually parted ways with the club. Key players renewed: Marco Turati, Carmine Giordano, Emanuele Catania, and Fernando Spinelli. Later, Scardina (loan from Pro Vercelli), Toscano (loan from Palermo), and Marco Palermo (fourth consecutive year since 2014–15) returned. On 25 June, Foggia-born Paolo Bianco, ex-assistant of the youth team of Sassuolo, was named coach. On 24 July, Nicola Mancino, a 33-year-old playmaker from 2010–2011, rejoined.

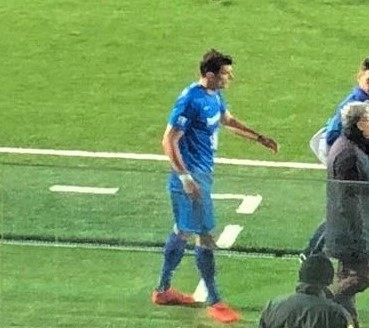
Giangiacomo Magnani in one of his last appearances in the azure jersey.

The first half of the 2017–2018 season confirmed Siracusa's growth, finishing fourth behind Lecce, Catania, and Trapani. They excelled away, with 6 wins, 2 draws, and 2 losses. In the winter market, Giangiacomo Magnani drew interest from Udinese, Sampdoria, and Cagliari, ultimately joining Perugia—aided by Juventus ties, who signed him the next year for €5 million on a five-year deal—bringing Siracusa about €500,000.

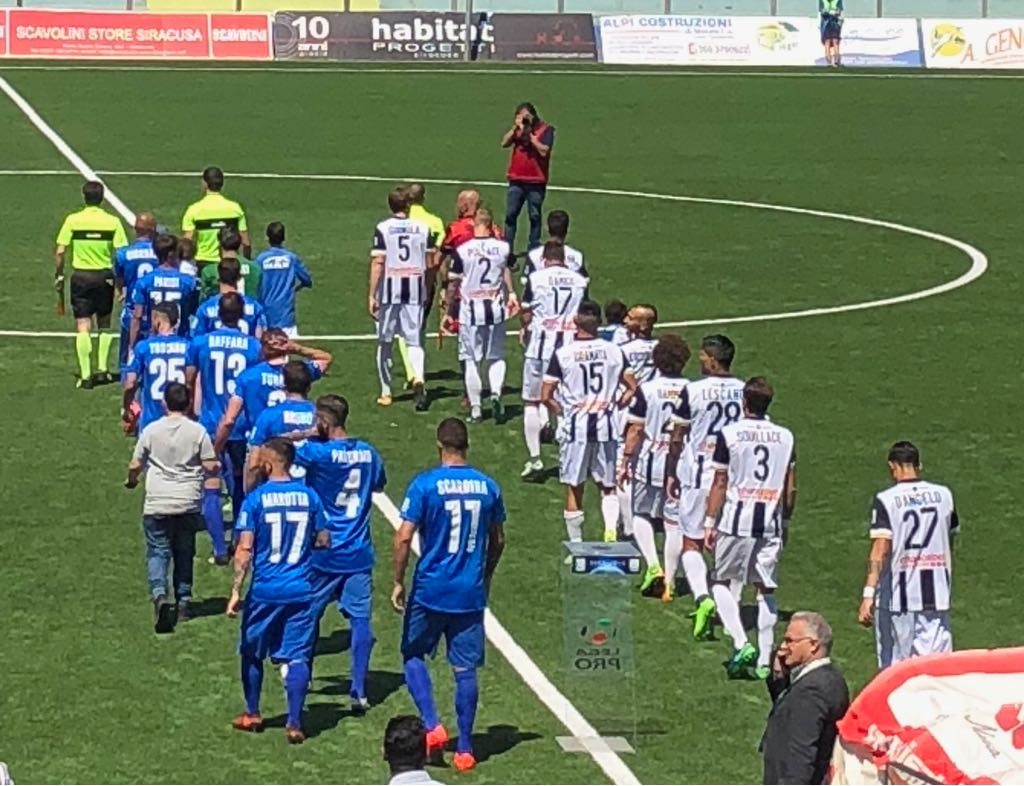
6 May 2018: Siracusa-Sicula Leonzio 1–0, the provincial derby returns to Serie C

On 28 February, the last day for free agents, Siracusa signed Caetano Calil, a Brazilian striker with a notable Serie B past at Crotone and Salernitana, recently departed from Catania. The season was marred by a 10-point penalty for financial breaches, dropping Siracusa from a play-off spot to 12th, narrowly avoiding play-outs.

==== 2018–2019: Alì & Santangelo management and bankruptcy ====
At the start of the 2018–2019 Serie C season, on 4 July 2018, Siracusa Calcio's ownership changed. Gaetano Cutrufo, credited with reviving the club to professionalism in five years (two Eccellenza, one Serie D, two Serie C), sold 100% of the shares to Adrano entrepreneur Giovanni Alì, who became president. Alì brought players and staff from his Serie D tenure with Troina, including coach Giuseppe Pagana and six Argentines, notably Federico Vázquez (20 goals with Troina the previous year), and top-tier Argentine league veterans Nicolas Cesar Rizzo and Francesco Celeste. Veterans Fernando Spinelli and Carmine Giordano left for Palazzolo in Eccellenza after five years.

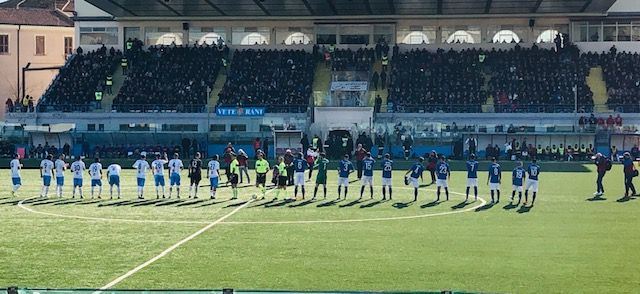
The Siracusa-Catania derby on 20 January ended 2–1 for the Blues

On 9 September, tragedy struck: team manager Davide Artale, a 27-year-old from Alcamo, died in a car crash in Contrada Spinagallo. Goalkeeper Maurice Gomis, who was with him, survived with minor injuries. On 31 October, Pagana resigned after five losses in seven games and poor fan rapport. Michele Pazienza, ex-Pisa, lasted six games with poor results, succeeded by assistant Ezio Raciti. In his Serie C debut, Raciti overcame field and financial woes (a 6-point penalty) to secure safety a game early. Memorable wins included a 2–1 home victory over Catania on 20 January and a 2–1 provincial derby against Sicula Leonzio on 31 March. On 24 June, the deadline for Serie C enrollment, the club failed to register despite pleas for aid, crippled by a reckless management under Alì and Santangelo. Debts of €1.7 million—mostly from multi-year contracts, mismanagement, and lack of sponsors—led to bankruptcy, seven years after the last one. The duo is remembered as the worst administration in the club's history.

On 16 July 2019, Syracuse's municipality issued a call for a new sports entity to enter Serie D via the Giorgetti ruling. Councilor Gaetano Favara launched a pre-season ticket campaign, rallying fans and sponsors, amassing 350 subscriptions and €50,000 in six days. By 24 July deadline, only Piedmontese entrepreneur Travagin (ex-Atletico Catania) applied, but his bid was deemed incomplete, prompting a reopening until 26 July. A proposal from Zurich Capital Funds, based in the United Arab Emirates, was accepted but failed due to timing issues, unable to secure a €350,000 bond with the Lega Nazionale Dilettanti, barring Siracusa from Serie D. Notably, ex-president Gaetano Cutrufo offered aid but submitted no bids, left unsupported.

==== 2019: Rebirth of ASD Siracusa ====
Missing out on Serie D and unable to enter Eccellenza (due to Real Siracusa Belvedere), in August 2019, amid widespread apathy, Gaetano Cutrufo stepped in again despite the fan backlash. Forming ASD Siracusa, he leveraged a regional Lega Nazionale Dilettanti rule for excluded professional clubs, securing a spot in Promozione on 8 August. Starting late, the squad included free agents like Argentines Llama (brother of Catania's Cristian), Alfieri, and Castillo. In the first half, they trailed leaders Pozzallo by eight points, finishing third. The December transfer window brought in locals such as Miraglia, top scorer Sollano (Melilli-born), midfielders Quarto and Pandolfo, and defenders Bianchini and Sigona. Siracusa became a juggernaut, racking up wins—often by large margins—taking the lead eight games from the end. Their run halted due to the global Coronavirus pandemic, prompting the federation to end all leagues early, promoting group leaders.

=== The 2020s ===
In the 2020–2021 season, after they were promoted to the Eccellenza, Siracusa aimed for a competitive squad. Retaining coach Scifo, they re-signed Emanuele Catania, who, after stints at Catania and Sicula Leonzio, vowed to end his career with Siracusa, aiding their rise with goals. Additions included defenders Raffaele Gambuzza and Alberto Cossentino (ex-Serie D, the latter an ex-Siracusa player in Serie C), returnees Carmine Giordano and Giacomo Fricano, and ex-Serie C players Ancione and Siclari. Despite a strong lineup, pre-season and Coppa Italia outings disappointed, leading Gaetano Cutrufo to sack Scifo for Giovanni Ignoffo, ex-Avellino Serie C coach and Siracusa player (2010–2012). Finishing second, a pandemic-altered play-off format saw them beat Aci S. Antonio in the semi-final but lose 3–2 to Giarre in the Agrigento final, delaying promotion. Post-season, Cutrufo swapped titles, acquiring Marina di Ragusa's (relegated but eligible for Serie D promotion), transferring Siracusa's to Fc Leonzio. However, Siracusa remained in Eccellenza. Cutrufo then handed full ownership to Montagno, ex-president from 1993 to 1994.

In the 2021–2022 season, a late change in ownership hampered preparations, resulting in a predominantly local roster that finished fifth under Roberto Regina, replaced mid-season by Giuseppe Mascara, who missed the play-offs. Emanuele Catania became Siracusa's all-time leading scorer with 73 goals.

==== 2022: Siracusa Calcio 1924 ====
For the 2022–23 season, aiming for promotion, president Montagno welcomed Tuscan entrepreneur Alessandro Ricci as a partner, adding sponsors for a robust transfer window. The club became ASD Siracusa Calcio 1924 (later Siracusa Calcio 1924 SSD) before its centenary. Key signings under coach Mascara included playmaker Luca Ficarrotta (ex-Palermo). A slow start saw Mascara sacked after seven games, replaced by Gaspare Cacciola. December reinforcements—Pettinato, Iraci, Privitera, goalkeeper Lumia, and foreigners Camara (ex-Inter) and Arquin—sparked a turnaround, briefly taking the lead before a loss to Igea Virtus. Finishing one point behind, Siracusa entered play-offs, crushing Taormina 4–0, then Ercolanese 3–0 at home and 2–1 away. In the final against Enna, a 1–1 draw away (Ficarrotta's late goal) preceded a 3–1 home win (Belluso, Arquin, Palermo) before a record 5,000 fans, securing Serie D and breaking a 50-year play-off final curse. Celebrations filled Piazza Archimede late into the night.

In Serie D for the 2023–24 season, Ricci took full ownership, merging with Accademia Siracusa to revive the youth academy and launching an Eccellenza women's team. Only goalkeeper Lumia and midfielder Palmisano stayed, with Cacciola adding players like Arcidiacono, Vacca, Aliperta, Maggio, Alma, Benassi, Zampa, Argentines Shurs and Tejio, Andrea Russotto, and Toni Markić. With 926 season tickets sold, fans embraced the revamp. The first half of the season yielded 13 wins and four draws in 17 games, placing second behind Trapani (four points ahead). Maggio and Alma led scoring, while crowds often exceeded 3,000, with sellouts against Trapani and Vibonese. In November, Siracusa acquired the historic A.S. Siracusa logo and assets for free from Giuliano, enabling a potential return to the storied name after nearly 30 years. In December, striker Manuel Sarao arrived from Catania to bolster an already strong attack.

In Serie D for the 2024–25 season, under new head coach Marco Turati, Siracusa won promotion to Serie C after a hard-fought battle against fallen giants Reggina.

== Colours and badge ==
The colours of the team are sky blue and white.

== Current squad ==
As of 2 February 2026

Note: Flags indicate national team as defined under FIFA eligibility rules; some limited exceptions apply. Players may hold more than one non-FIFA nationality.

| No. | Pos. | Nation | Player |
|---|---|---|---|
| 1 | GK | ITA | Lorenzo Arceri |
| 2 | DF | ITA | Mattia Puzone |
| 3 | DF | ITA | Damiano Cancellieri (on loan from Avellino) |
| 5 | DF | ITA | Federico Pacciardi |
| 7 | MF | ITA | Alessandro Sbaffo |
| 8 | MF | ITA | Filippo Damian |
| 9 | FW | ITA | Gabriel Arditi (on loan from Catanzaro) |
| 10 | MF | ITA | Orazio Pannitteri (on loan from Latina) |
| 11 | MF | ITA | Pasquale Riccardi |
| 12 | GK | ITA | Bryan Bonucci |
| 13 | DF | ITA | Ruben Falla |
| 14 | FW | ITA | Gianluca Contini |
| 17 | MF | ITA | Maiko Candiano |
| 18 | DF | ARG | Thiago Capomaggio |
| 19 | FW | ITA | Nicola Valente |
| 20 | MF | LTU | Ernestas Gudelevičius |

| No. | Pos. | Nation | Player |
|---|---|---|---|
| 21 | MF | ITA | Francesco Contaldo |
| 22 | GK | ITA | Alessandro Farroni |
| 24 | MF | ITA | Carmelo Limonelli |
| 25 | DF | ITA | Christian Bonacchi |
| 26 | DF | ITA | Andrea Marafini |
| 28 | MF | ITA | Giulio Frisenna (on loan from Catania) |
| 29 | MF | ITA | Jacopo Simonetta (on loan from Como) |
| 30 | FW | ITA | Mattia Morreale |
| 33 | MF | ITA | Matteo Zanini |
| 41 | DF | ITA | Daniele Portuesi |
| 42 | DF | ITA | Simone Iob |
| 43 | MF | ITA | Emanuele Terracciano |
| 72 | MF | ITA | Enrico Di Gesù (on loan from Lecco) |
| 77 | FW | ITA | Sebastiano Di Paolo (on loan from Cagliari) |
| 96 | GK | SEN | Alioune Sylla |

=== Out on loan ===
Note: Flags indicate national team as defined under FIFA eligibility rules; some limited exceptions apply. Players may hold more than one non-FIFA nationality.

| No. | Pos. | Nation | Player |
|---|---|---|---|
| — | DF | ITA | Etienne Catena (at Pergolettese until 30 June 2026) |

== See also ==
- Syracuse, Sicily
- Sport in Sicily

== Bibliography ==
- Di Silvestro, Giuseppe; Spada, Nuccio (1974). Il Siracusa ha cinquant'anni [Siracusa Turns Fifty] (in Italian).
- Spada, Nuccio (1981). Azzurro intenso, azzurro sbiadito [Deep Azure, Faded Azure] (in Italian).
- Nania, Francesco (1994). Schizzo azzurro [Azure Sketch] (in Italian).
- Samà, Cesare (2009). Quando il leone ruggiva. I sette anni del Siracusa in serie B (1946–1953) [When the Lion Roared: Siracusa's Seven Years in Serie B (1946–1953)] (in Italian). Morrone Editore.
- Mantineo, Jose (2010). La fossa del leone [The Lion's Den] (in Italian). Emanuele Romeo Editore.
- Caia, Giancarlo; Caia, Angelo; Fontanelli, Carlo; Messina, Alessio; Scatà, Paolo (2011). Almanacco azzurro [Azure Almanac] (in Italian). Empoli: Geo Edizioni. p. 318.
- Pierri, Gianluca (2011). I veri leoni vincono sempre [True Lions Always Win] (in Italian).
