= 2011–12 Lega Pro Prima Divisione =

Lega Pro Prima Divisione
- Season: 2011–12
- Champions: Ternana (group A); Spezia (group B)
- Promoted: Ternana (group A); Spezia (group B)
- Relegated: Foligno (group A); Bassano Virtus (group B)

The 2011–12 Lega Pro Prima Divisione season was the thirty-fourth football league season of Italian Serie C1 since its establishment in 1978, and the fourth since the renaming from Serie C to Lega Pro.

It will be divided into two phases: the regular season, and the playoff phase.

The league should also be composed of 36 teams divided into two divisions of 18 teams each.

Teams finishing first in the regular season, plus one team winning the playoff round from each division will be promoted to Serie B; teams finishing last in the regular season, plus two relegation playoff losers from each division will be relegated to Lega Pro Seconda Divisione. In all, four teams will be promoted to Serie B, and six teams will be relegated to Lega Pro Seconda Divisione.

== Events ==
=== Start of the season ===
On 12 July Gela, Lucchese and Salernitana do not appeal against the exclusion of Covisoc and relegated to Serie D or lower.

On 18 July 2011 the Federal Council excluded Atletico Roma and Ravenna. Both clubs announced appeals to the Olympic Committee against the decision.

The final composition of the rounds was announced 4 August 2011. The five vacancies created were filled by the following teams, all of which were destined to play in Lega Pro Seconda Divisione for the 2011–12 season before the call-up:

- Südtirol, which finished 17th in Prima Divisione 2010-11 - Girone A, originally relegated for losing in the playouts.
- Ternana, which finished 15th in Prima Divisione 2010-11 - Girone A, originally relegated for losing in the playouts.
- Pro Vercelli, which finished 3rd and lost in the playoff final in Seconda Divisione 2010-11 - Girone A
- Prato, which finished 3rd and lost in the playoff final in Seconda Divisione 2010-11 - Girone B
- Avellino, which finished 4th and lost in the playoff final in Seconda Divisione 2010-11 - Girone C

On 9 August 2011 Alessandria relegated to the last place by Italian national disciplinary committee for match fixing. Monza remained in the league in its place.

== Group A ==
=== Teams ===
Location of teams in Girone A 2011–12

Club	City	Stadium	Capacity	2011–12 season
Avellino	Avellino	Partenio-Lombardi	26,308	4th in Lega Pro Seconda Divisione C
Benevento	Benevento	Ciro Vigorito	18,975	2nd in Lega Pro Prima Divisione B
Carpi	Carpi (playing in Reggio Emilia)	Città del Tricolore	20,084	1st in Lega Pro Seconda Divisione B
Como	Como	Giuseppe Sinigaglia	15,000	8th in Lega Pro Prima Divisione A
Foggia	Foggia	Pino Zaccheria	25,000	6th in Lega Pro Prima Divisione B
Foligno	Foligno	Enzo Blasone	5,650	16th in Lega Pro Prima Divisione B
Lumezzane	Lumezzane	Nuovo Comunale	4,150	6th in Lega Pro Prima Divisione A
Monza	Monza	Brianteo	18,568	15th in Lega Pro Prima Divisione A
Pavia	Pavia	Pietro Fortunati	6,000	12th in Lega Pro Prima Divisione A
Pisa	Pisa	Arena Garibaldi	17,000	10th in Lega Pro Prima Divisione B
Pro Vercelli	Vercelli	Silvio Piola	6,165	3rd in Lega Pro Seconda Divisione A
Reggiana	Reggio Emilia	Città del Tricolore	20,084	7th in Lega Pro Prima Divisione A
Sorrento	Sorrento	Italia	3,600	2nd in Lega Pro Prima Divisione A
SPAL	Ferrara	Paolo Mazza	19,000	9th in Lega Pro Prima Divisione A
Taranto	Taranto	Erasmo Iacovone	27,583	4th in Lega Pro Prima Divisione B
Ternana	Terni	Libero Liberati	22,000	15th in Lega Pro Prima Divisione B
Tritium	Trezzo sull'Adda	Comunale	3,000	1st in Lega Pro Seconda Divisione A
Viareggio	Viareggio	Torquato Bresciani	7,000	17th in Lega Pro Prima Divisione B

=== League table ===
Pos	Team	Pld	W	D	L	GF	GA	GD	Pts	Promotion or relegation
1	Ternana (P)	34	17	14	3	40	19	+21	65	Promotion to Serie B
2	Taranto (D, E, R)	34	19	13	2	41	16	+25	63 (Note: Taranto was docked 7 points in total: 1 point due to the 2011 Italian football scandal. and 6 points for financial irregularities.)	Phoenix in Serie D
3	Carpi	34	17	10	7	46	26	+20	61	Playoffs
4	Sorrento	34	16	12	6	43	26	+17	58 (Note: Sorrento was docked 2 points for match fixing with Juve Stabia.)	Playoffs
5	Pro Vercelli (O, P)	34	15	12	7	40	19	+21	57	Playoffs
6	Benevento (D)	34	17	7	10	46	34	+12	56 (Note: Benevento was docked 2 points (originally 6 points, reduced by Tnas) due to the 2011 Italian football scandal.)	
7	Pisa	34	11	13	10	37	35	+2	46	
8	Lumezzane	34	12	7	15	28	35	−7	43	
9	Reggiana	34	12	7	15	36	42	−6	41 (Note: Reggiana was docked 2 points due to the 2011 Italian football scandal.)	
10	Avellino	34	11	7	16	39	46	−7	40	
11	Foggia (E, R)	34	11	9	14	33	38	−5	38 (Note: Foligno and Foggia were docked 4 points for financial irregularities.)	Phoenix in Serie D
12	Tritium	34	9	10	15	26	40	−14	37	
13	Como	34	10	9	15	39	47	−8	36 (Note: Como was docked 3 points: 1 point (originally 2 points, reduced by Federal Court of Justice) for administrative irregularities and 2 point for financial irregularities.)	
14	Viareggio	34	10	6	18	31	47	−16	36	Relegation play-off
15	SPAL (D, R, E, R)	34	11	9	14	32	36	−4	34 (Note: SPAL was docked 8 points for financial irregularities.)	Phoenix in Serie D
16	Pavia	34	7	12	15	37	50	−13	33	Relegation play-off
17	Monza (R)	34	7	12	15	27	42	−15	33	Relegation play-off
18	Foligno (R)	34	6	7	21	24	47	−23	21	Relegation to Seconda Divisione

Source: Lega-pro.com
Rules for classification: 1) points; 2) goal difference; 3) number of goals scored.
(D) Disqualified; (E) Eliminated; (O) Play-off winners; (P) Promoted; (R) Relegated

=== Results ===
Home \ Away	AVE	BEN	CRP	COM	FOG	FOL	LUM	MON	PAV	PIS	PVE	REA	SOR	SPA	TAR	TER	TRI	VIA
Avellino		1–1	1–0	3–3	4–0	2–0	2–1	1–2	1–1	1–0	2–1	2–0	0–1	2–1	1–2	1–3	1–2	2–0
Benevento	2–2		0–1	1–0	0–1	1–0	3–0	1–0	2–0	2–0	1–1	2–2	1–0	2–0	2–1	0–2	1–0	5–1
Carpi	0–0	1–1		1–0	3–2	1–0	3–0	2–0	2–1	2–2	2–1	3–1	1–0	1–0	0–2	1–1	4–0	3–0
Como	1–0	2–1	1–0		0–0	2–2	2–1	0–1	2–1	1–2	1–0	1–2	2–2	0–2	1–1	0–0	1–2	1–2
Foggia	1–1	1–2	1–2	1–2		2–0	1–0	1–0	1–2	1–0	1–1	0–2	1–1	0–2	0–1	3–1	0–1	1–1
Foligno	1–0	2–2	1–0	1–2	0–1		1–2	1–0	2–2	0–2	0–0	1–1	2–1	0–1	1–2	1–1	0–1	1–1
Lumezzane	2–1	0–2	1–1	2–2	2–0	3–0		0–0	1–2	1–1	0–1	1–0	0–1	0–0	0–3	0–0	1–0	1–0
Monza	1–1	1–2	0–1	1–1	2–1	2–1	0–1		2–2	0–2	0–1	0–2	0–3	3–1	0–0	0–2	1–1	0–3
Pavia	2–3	1–2	0–0	2–1	0–2	3–0	0–2	0–0		1–1	1–2	1–1	0–2	1–0	0–2	0–0	2–2	1–2
Pisa	3–0	2–0	2–1	1–0	1–1	2–0	0–2	2–2	1–0		1–4	2–1	2–2	1–2	2–2	1–1	0–2	2–0
Pro Vercelli	4–1	3–0	0–0	2–0	0–0	0–1	1–0	1–1	0–1	0–0		2–0	4–0	1–0	0–0	0–0	2–0	2–0
Reggiana	1–0	0–2	1–1	2–4	0–2	2–1	1–0	1–2	2–1	1–0	1–1		1–1	3–0	0–1	0–2	3–1	1–1
Sorrento	2–0	2–0	2–1	2–0	2–0	1–0	1–2	2–0	2–2	1–1	2–1	2–1		1–1	0–0	0–0	2–0	2–0
SPAL	3–1	0–2	2–2	2–1	1–2	3–2	0–2	0–0	4–0	1–1	1–1	0–1	0–1		0–0	0–0	2–1	1–0
Taranto	2–0	1–1	1–1	3–1	2–1	1–0	1–0	2–1	2–1	0–0	0–0	1–0	1–0	1–0		0–1	2–0	2–0
Ternana	2–1	2–0	2–1	2–1	1–1	2–1	1–0	1–1	2–2	1–0	1–0	2–0	0–0	0–1	1–1		2–0	1–0
Tritium	1–0	2–1	0–1	1–1	1–1	0–1	0–0	1–3	1–1	0–0	1–2	0–1	0–0	1–1	1–1	2–0		0–2
Viareggio	0–1	2–1	0–3 (Note: The score of Viareggio-Carpi was transformed by sports judgment from 3-2 to 0-3.)	1–2	0–2	1–0	4–0	1–1	1–3	2–0	0–1	2–1	2–2	2–0	0–0	0–3	0–1	

Legend: Blue = home team win; Yellow = draw; Red = away team win.

=== Play-offs ===
==== Promotion ====
Semifinals
First legs scheduled 20 May 2012; return legs scheduled 27 May 2012

Team 1	Agg.	Team 2	1st leg	2nd leg
Pro Vercelli(5)	2–1	(2)Taranto	2–1	0–0
Sorrento(4)	1–1	(3)Carpi	0–1	1–0

Final
First leg scheduled 3 June 2012; return leg scheduled 10 June 2012

Team 1	Agg.	Team 2	1st leg	2nd leg
Pro Vercelli(5)	3–1	(3)Carpi	0–0	3–1

Pro Vercelli promoted to Serie B.

==== Relegation ====
First legs scheduled 20 May 2012; return legs scheduled 27 May 2012

Team 1	Agg.	Team 2	1st leg	2nd leg
Monza(17)	1–5	(14)Viareggio	0–1	1–4
Pavia(16)	2–0	(15)SPAL	0–0	2–0

== Group B ==
=== Teams ===
Location of teams in Girone B 2011–12

Club	City	Stadium	Capacity	2010–11 season
Andria BAT	Andria	degli Ulivi	9,140	13th in Lega Pro Prima Divisione B
Barletta	Barletta	Cosimo Puttilli	5,000	11th in Lega Pro Prima Divisione B
Bassano Virtus	Bassano del Grappa	Rino Mercante	2,952	11th in Lega Pro Prima Divisione A
Carrarese	Carrara	dei Marmi	15,000	2nd in Lega Pro Seconda Divisione B
Cremonese	Cremona	Giovanni Zini	22,000	10th in Lega Pro Prima Divisione A
FeralpiSalò	Salò and Lonato del Garda (playing in Salò)	Lino Turina	2,000	2nd in Lega Pro Seconda Divisione A
Frosinone	Frosinone	Matusa	9,680	22nd in Serie B
Latina	Latina	Domenico Francioni	8,000	1st in Lega Pro Seconda Divisione C
Pergocrema	Crema	Giuseppe Voltini	3,490	14th in Lega Pro Prima Divisione A
Piacenza	Piacenza	Leonardo Garilli	21,668	19th in Serie B
Portogruaro	Portogruaro	Piergiovanni Mecchia	3,335	21st in Serie B
Prato	Prato	Lungobisenzio	6,800	3rd in Lega Pro Seconda Divisione B
Siracusa	Syracuse	Nicola De Simone	6,200	9th in Lega Pro Prima Divisione B
Spezia	La Spezia	Alberto Picco	10,000	5th in Lega Pro Prima Divisione A
Südtirol	Bolzano	Marco Druso	3,000	16th in Lega Pro Prima Divisione A
Trapani	Trapani (playing in Erice)	Provinciale	7,000	2nd in Lega Pro Seconda Divisione C
Triestina	Trieste	Nereo Rocco	32,454	20th in Serie B
Virtus Lanciano	Lanciano	Guido Biondi	8,000	8th in Lega Pro Prima Divisione B

=== League table ===
Pos	Team	Pld	W	D	L	GF	GA	GD	Pts	Promotion or relegation
1	Spezia (C, P)	34	17	11	6	48	29	+19	62	Promotion to Serie B
2	Trapani	34	17	9	8	57	42	+15	60	Playoffs
3	Siracusa (Note: Siracusa did not appeal to the exclusion of Federal Council and was dissolved; an illegitimate phoenix club was refounded restarting from Terza Categoria.) (D, E, R, R, R)	34	18	9	7	46	31	+15	58 (Note: Siracusa and Pergocrema were docked 5 points for financial irregularities.)	Phoenix in Promozione
4	Virtus Lanciano (O, P)	34	15	9	10	40	35	+5	54	Playoffs
5	Cremonese	34	15	10	9	47	30	+17	49 (Note: Cremonese was docked 6 points due to the 2011 Italian football scandal.)	Playoffs
6	Barletta	34	12	13	9	43	38	+5	48 (Note: Barletta was docked 1 point for violation of the rules on betting.)	
7	Südtirol	34	11	13	10	39	34	+5	46	
8	Carrarese	34	11	12	11	43	39	+4	45	
9	Frosinone	34	13	6	15	40	41	−1	45	
10	Portogruaro	34	10	12	12	41	45	−4	42	
11	Pergocrema (E, R)	34	12	9	13	33	46	−13	40	Phoenix in Serie D
12	Andria BAT	34	9	12	13	37	38	−1	39	
13	FeralpiSalò	34	9	11	14	26	37	−11	38	
14	Prato	34	8	11	15	36	44	−8	35	Relegation play-off
15	Triestina (R, E, R, R)	34	9	8	17	43	55	−12	35	Phoenix in Eccellenza
16	Latina	34	8	11	15	37	45	−8	35	Relegation play-off
17	Piacenza (D, R, E, R, R)	34	10	13	11	41	49	−8	34 (Note: Piacenza was docked 9 points in total: 4 points due to the 2011 Italian football scandal. and 5 points for financial irregularities.)	Phoenix in Eccellenza
18	Bassano Virtus (R)	34	7	11	16	29	48	−19	32	Relegation to Seconda Divisione

Source: Lega-pro.com
Rules for classification: 1) points; 2) goal difference; 3) number of goals scored.
(C) Champions; (D) Disqualified; (E) Eliminated; (O) Play-off winners; (P) Promoted; (R) Relegated

=== Results ===
Home \ Away	AND	BRL	BAS	CAR	CRE	FER	FRO	LAT	PER	PIA	POR	PRA	SIR	SPE	SÜD	TRA	TRI	VLN
Andria BAT		2–1	1–1	2–0	0–1	1–1	2–2	0–1	1–2	1–0	5–0	1–0	1–0	1–2	3–1	1–2	2–1	0–1
Barletta	2–2		1–0	2–0	1–0	0–1	1–0	1–1	2–0	2–1	1–1	3–1	3–2	0–1	1–1	0–2	1–1	2–2
Bassano Virtus	0–2	0–1		1–0	1–3	1–2	2–1	0–1	0–1 (Note: The Sport Judge had initially annulled the result of 0-1 of the match Bassano-Pergocrema for mistaken identity from the referee who has warned Guidetti instead Inacio that had to be expelled for a second yellow card. The Federal Court of Justice has restored instead the result of 0-1.)	2–2	1–0	0–0	1–2	0–0	0–0	0–7	2–0	0–1
Carrarese	3–1	0–0	1–0		2–1	0–0	0–1	2–0	4–1	2–2	2–0	0–0	1–1	2–1	1–1	3–0	3–0	1–3
Cremonese	1–0	2–2	4–2	3–0		1–0	2–0	2–0	1–1	0–1	1–2	0–0	3–1	3–2	1–1	2–4	1–1	2–0
FeralpiSalò	0–0	1–0	0–0	2–2	1–0		1–2	2–1	0–3	0–1	0–2	0–1	1–2	1–1	0–0	1–2	2–0	1–1
Frosinone	1–0	2–1	1–2	1–0	0–1	1–1		1–1	5–1	2–0	2–1	3–1	0–1	3–2	1–2	1–2	2–1	2–1
Latina	5–2	1–1	0–1	1–0	1–1	0–1	2–0		1–2	2–2	4–1	0–1	1–1	1–2	2–1	3–0	0–2	1–3
Pergocrema	0–0	0–2	2–0	2–2	1–3	1–0	3–0	1–1		0–2	1–4	0–0	2–0	1–2	2–1	0–5	0–0	0–2
Piacenza	0–0	2–2	3–2	0–3	1–3	2–2	1–1	1–1	0–0		0–0	4–3	1–1	0–1	0–0	0–1	0–3	3–1
Portogruaro	1–1	1–1	1–1	3–1	0–4	0–0	1–0	1–1	0–1	2–2		2–2	0–1	1–1	1–0	2–2	3–1	2–3
Prato	2–1	1–2	0–2	1–1	0–0	2–3	1–0	2–1	2–0	0–3	1–1		0–1	2–2	2–3	1–2	5–0	0–1
Siracusa	2–0	2–0	2–2	3–1	0–0	1–0	1–0	0–0	1–2	3–0	1–0	3–0		3–1	1–3	3–1	2–0	1–0
Spezia	0–0	1–1	3–0	1–1	0–0	3–0	2–1	3–0	2–0	3–0	0–2	1–0	1–1		2–1	2–0	1–1	1–0
Südtirol	1–1	3–2	0–0	1–1	2–0	2–0	1–0	2–0	0–1	1–2	2–0	2–2	0–0	1–2		1–1	1–1	1–0
Trapani	1–1	1–1	3–3	1–0	0–0	2–0	2–2	2–0	0–0	3–0	1–5	2–1	1–2	1–0	1–0		3–2	1–3
Triestina	1–1	1–2	2–2	2–3	1–0	1–0	1–2	2–2	3–2	1–3	1–0	0–2	4–0	1–2	1–2	2–1		3–0
Virtus Lanciano	2–1	2–1	1–0	1–1	2–1	1–2	0–0	2–1	0–0	1–2	0–1	0–0	1–1	0–0	2–1	0–0	3–2	

Legend: Blue = home team win; Yellow = draw; Red = away team win.

=== Play-offs ===
==== Promotion ====
Semifinals
First legs scheduled 20 May 2012; return legs scheduled 27 May 2012

Team 1	Agg.	Team 2	1st leg	2nd leg
Cremonese(5)	2–2	(2)Trapani	1–1	1–1
Virtus Lanciano(4)	3–2	(3)Siracusa	1–0	2–2

Final
First leg scheduled 3 June 2012; return leg scheduled 10 June 2012

Team 1	Agg.	Team 2	1st leg	2nd leg
Virtus Lanciano(4)	4–2	(2)Trapani	1–1	3–1

Virtus Lanciano promoted to Serie B.

==== Relegation ====
First legs scheduled 20 May 2012; return legs scheduled 27 May 2012

Team 1	Agg.	Team 2	1st leg	2nd leg
Piacenza (17)	1–1	(14)Prato	1–0	0–1
Latina (16)	4–2	(15)Triestina	2–0	2–2

== Supercoppa di Lega di Prima Divisione ==
Season	Home team	Score	Away team	Venue
2011–12	Ternana	0 - 0	Spezia	Stadio Libero Liberati, Terni
2011–12	Spezia	2 - 1	Ternana	Stadio Alberto Picco, La Spezia
2011–12	Spezia (group B) won 2–1 on aggregate
