= Sonzogni =

Sonzogni (pronounced [sonˈdzoɲɲi]) is an Italian surname from Bergamo, originally indicating families from a fortified town overlooking Zogno. Notable people with this surname include:

- Fabio Sonzogni (born 1963), Italian film and theatre director and actor
- Giuliano Sonzogni (born 1949), Italian football manager
- Manuela Sonzogni (born 1985), Italian racing cyclist

== See also ==
- Edoardo Sonzogno (1836–1920), Italian publisher
