= Charlie Stillitano =

American sports executive and radio presenter

- Known for: Sports Executive; Radio Presenter

Charlie Stillitano is an American sports executive and radio presenter. Stillitano is President of TEG Sport North America and Head of Global Sport, and President of Spezia Calcio. Stillitano is the co-founder and former executive chairman of Relevent Sports, the company that hosted the International Champions Cup, and as a host of The Football Show on SiriusXM FC 188 which airs weekdays at 7am Eastern.

== Biography ==
Charlie was born in New Jersey. His father, Charlie Sr., was one of the founders of the Italian-American Soccer League in the New York Metro Area and he served as President of the Soccer Referee Association of New Jersey.

Stillitano played soccer at the Pingry School where he became captain and was named to the First Team All State. Following high school, Charlie attended Princeton University where he became captain of the Princeton Tigers men's soccer team. At Princeton, he was named as an All-American and All-Ivy League.

Stillitano went on to get a Juris Doctor degree and eventually was named the venue director for Giants Stadium at the 1994 World Cup. With Major League Soccer starting in 1996, Stillitano became the general manager of the New York/New Jersey MetroStars.

In 2003, he was the largest shareholder of the promoter ChampionsWorld, before moving on to Creative Arts Agency (organizers of the World Football Challenge) in 2007 which was bought out by Stephen M. Ross' Relevent Sports [sic] agency in 2012. Stillitano is currently the chairman of Relevent.

Charlie has been named as one of the most influential people in global football by both ESPN and The Score.

He is a radio daily talk show host for The Football Show for SiriusXM FC channel 188, SiriusXM's all soccer channel. It airs weekdays at 7am Eastern where he is joined by Tom Rennie and "Rocky" Ray Hudson. His listeners have dubbed him "Champagne Charlie" due to his busy travel schedule which requires him to meet some of the most powerful people in world football.
