= Alessandro Sbaffo =

Italian footballer (born 1990)

Personal information
- Date of birth: 2 August 1990 (age 36)
- Place of birth: Loreto, Italy
- Height: 1.88 m (6 ft 2 in)
- Position: Midfielder

Team information
- Current team: Siracusa
- Number: 7

Youth career
- 1998–2007: Portorecanati
- 2007–2010: Chievo

Senior career*
| Years | Team | Apps | (Gls) |
| 2010–2016 | Chievo | 2 | (0) |
| 2010–2011 | → Piacenza (loan) | 14 | (0) |
| 2011–2012 | → Ascoli (loan) | 32 | (3) |
| 2013–2014 | → Reggina (loan) | 30 | (2) |
| 2014–2015 | → Latina (loan) | 12 | (0) |
| 2015 | → Avellino (loan) | 14 | (2) |
| 2015–2016 | → Como (loan) | 10 | (2) |
| 2016–2017 | Avellino | 11 | (0) |
| 2016–2017 | → Reggiana (loan) | 25 | (2) |
| 2017–2019 | AlbinoLeffe | 59 | (9) |
| 2019–2020 | Gubbio | 20 | (5) |
| 2020 | → Arzignano (loan) | 3 | (0) |
| 2020–2025 | Recanatese | 131 | (61) |
| 2025–2026 | Sambenedettese | 29 | (2) |
| 2026– | Siracusa | 16 | (3) |

International career
| 2011 | Italy U21 Serie B | 1 | (0) |
- * Club domestic league appearances and goals as of 1 May 2026

Alessandro Sbaffo (born 27 August 1990) is an Italian footballer who plays as a midfielder for Serie D club Siracusa.

== Career ==
He made his Serie A debut for Chievo on 28 March 2010 in a game against Parma.

In summer 2010, Sbaffo left for Piacenza in temporary deal for €600,000 along with Cesare Rickler. Both players later banned due to involvement in 2011–12 Italian football scandal.

Sbaffo left for Ascoli Calcio 1898 in temporary deal in July 2011. He also received a call-up to Italy U21 B team in the first half of the season. On 1 June 2012, FIGC announced that the prosecutor request to ban Sbaffo for 3 years and 3 months. Then Sbaffo made a plea bargain in order to request the ban reduced to 16 months and €100,000 fine.

In 2013, Sbaffo played 2 games for Chievo in pre-season and left for Reggina on 5 August. Sbaffo played his first official game for Reggina in October 2013.

On 26 August 2014, he left for Latina in another temporary deal.

On 4 July 2019, he signed with Gubbio. On 31 January 2020 he moved to Arzignano.

On 8 September 2020, he joined Serie D club Recanatese.
