= Marco Turati =

Italian footballer

Personal information
- Date of birth: 15 May 1982 (age 44)
- Place of birth: Lecco, Italy
- Height: 1.88 m (6 ft 2 in)
- Position: Centre back

Team information
- Current team: Spezia (head coach)

Youth career
- Hellas Verona

Senior career*
Years	Team	Apps	(Gls)
2002–2003	→ Chieti (loan)	25	(2)
2003	→ Carrarese (loan)	18	(1)
2004–2007	Verona	62	(7)
2007–2009	Cesena	23	(1)
2008–2009	→ Ancona (loan)	31	(4)
2009–2011	Grosseto	62	(7)
2011–2012	Modena	19	(0)
2015–2016	Lecco	18	(4)
2016–2019	Siracusa	83	(6)

Managerial career
- 2024–2026: Siracusa
- 2026–: Spezia
- * Club domestic league appearances and goals

Marco Turati (born 15 May 1982) is an Italian football manager and a former centre back who is the head coach of Serie C Group B club Spezia.

== Career ==
On 1 September 2008, he was loaned to Ancona.

== Management career ==
At the end of the 2018–19 season, Turati hung up his boots and joined the technical staff of Spezia as a technical collaborator of Vincenzo Italiano. He successively followed Italiano at Fiorentina until 2024, when he took on his first head coaching role at Serie D club Siracusa, a former team of his as a player.

With Siracusa, he won the Group I title by the end of the 2024–25 Serie D season, thus guiding the Sicilians back to Serie C.

== Honours ==
=== Manager ===
Siracusa

- Serie D: 2024–25 (Group I)
