= Engelbert König (senior) =

Austrian association football player (1884–1951)

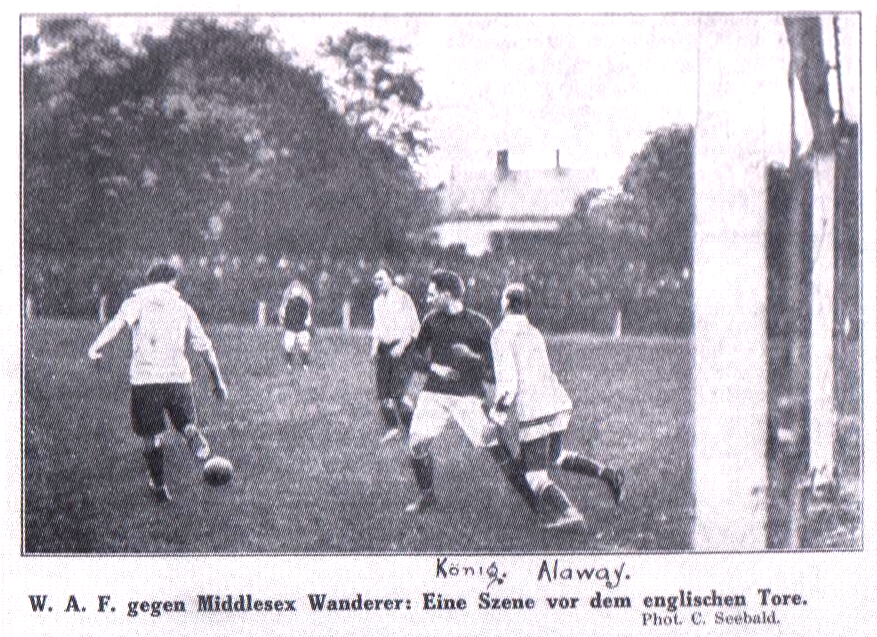

Personal information
- Full name: Engelbert König
- Date of birth: 18 October 1884
- Place of birth: Austria-Hungary
- Date of death: 10 September 1951 (aged 66)
- Position: Forward

Senior career*
Years	Team	Apps	(Gls)
1905–1912	Vienna Cricketer		
1911–1913	SC Germania Schwechat		
1913–1920	Wiener AF		

International career
1905–1912	Austria	5	(0)

Managerial career
- 1928–1931: AC Milan
- 1932: Messina
- 1933–1934: Foggia
- 1934–1935: Bari
- 1936–1937: Vigevano
- 1937–1938: Pavese Luigi Belli
- 1938–1939: Rovigo
- 1939–1940: Messina
- 1941–1942: Grosseto
- 1946: Siracusa
- Foligno
- * Club domestic league appearances and goals

Engelbert König (18 October 1884 – 10 September 1951) was an Austrian football player, and later a manager.

König was a well-built player and was known for playing a very physical game. On October 29, 1911, he was playing for WAF against SK Rapid Wien when he tackled Josef Jech injuring his kneecap, so badly that he had to be transported to the hospital. The Rapid fans invaded the pitch and chased and chased the WAF players into their cabin. On a previous occasion he also injured Viktor Löwenfeld.

== Playing career ==
He played as a forward, beginning his club career with the Vienna Cricket and Football-Club in July 1905. In July 1911 he moved on to Wiener AF, remaining there until June 1913. Then he moved to SC Germania Schwechat, until he retired as a player in 1920.
