= Spezia Calcio =

Association football club in La Spezia, Italy

Spezia
- Full name: Spezia Calcio
- Nicknames: Aquilotti (Little Eagles); Le Aquile (The Eagles); I Bianchi (The Whites)
- Founded: 10 October 1906; 120 years ago (as Spezia FBC); 1954; 72 years ago (as AC Spezia-Arsenal); 1995; 31 years ago (as Spezia Calcio 1906); 2008; 18 years ago (as ASD Spezia 2008)
- Stadium: Stadio Alberto Picco
- Capacity: 11,466
- Owner: RAM Spezia Holdings LP
- President: Charlie Stillitano
- Head coach: Marco Turati
- League: Serie C Group B
- 2025–26: Serie B, 19th of 20 (relegated)
- Website: speziacalcio.com
Home colours	Away colours	Third colours

Spezia Calcio is an Italian professional football club based in La Spezia, Liguria, currently competing in Serie C. Spezia Calcio was founded in 1906 by the Swiss banker Hermann Hurni (or Hurny in some documents), who played for the early Crystal Palace amateur teams in London during his time there as a student.

The first Spezia playing kit, light blue and white, was a second-hand amateur Crystal Palace kit donated to Hurny when he returned to La Spezia. In 1911, following the decision of Alberto Picco and others to honour Pro Vercelli as an example of a small team able to beat the big teams, a plain white shirt was adopted with black shorts and black socks, which is still in use today. In the 1920s prior to the creation of Serie A, Spezia played several top league games against the giants of Italian football including AC Milan, Juventus, and Inter Milan. The club has participated in all tiers of the Italian football system.

Spezia won the 1944 Campionato Alta Italia which was officially recognized by FIGC (the Italian Football Federation) in 2002 after a long dispute and the use of a special permanent badge was authorized. The tricolour badge is exhibited on the official jerseys during games and has a different shape and size compared to the ordinary Scudetto.

Following the fall from Serie B in 1951, Spezia was destined to languish in third and fourth division for 55 years. The 2000s saw the return to Serie B in 2006, bankruptcy and the rebirth re-establishing themselves as a regular Serie B team once again. In 2020, exactly 100 years from its first appearance at the top level, Spezia finally returned to Serie A as the winner of the promotion play-offs, securing a second Serie A term for the 2021–22 season.

== History ==
=== Early history (1906–1944) ===
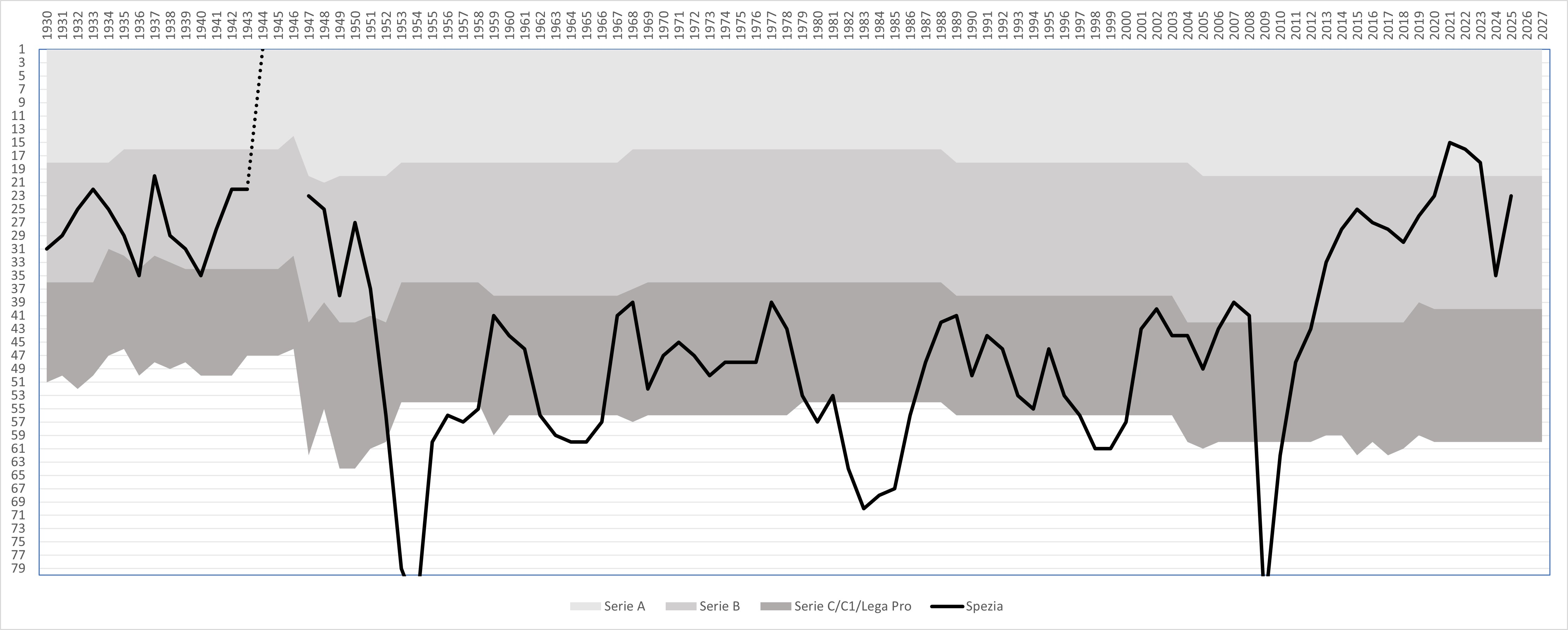
The performance of Spezia in the Italian football league structure since the first season of a unified Serie A (1929/30). The 1944 Scudetto was officially recognized in 2002.

Spezia Calcio was founded in 1906 by the Swiss banker Hermann Hurny (or Hurni in some documents), who played for the reserves of Crystal Palace in London during his time there as a student. Allegedly the first Spezia kit, light blue and white, was a second hand Crystal Palace kit donated to Hurny when he returned to La Spezia. He played for Crystal Palace again (in its revived form) in 1909.

In 1926, they won the Seconda Divisione and were promoted to the Prima Divisione, which was at that time the second-highest level of Italian football. In 1929 Spezia won the Prima Divisione but the league was demoted to become the third division in Italy so the team remained at the second level, playing in Serie B.

For the 1929–30 season, the club played in the first season of the newly formed Serie B and changed their name to AC Spezia. Spezia remained at this level before suffering relegation in 1935, only to swiftly return for the 1936–37 season.

In 1944, because of World War II, the Italian football federation decided to split the top league into regional rounds. The team, named 42° Corpo dei Vigili del Fuoco della Spezia (Firefighters of La Spezia) after a merger with the local firefighter to have a sufficient number of players, was included in Round D of Emilia-Romagna, together with Corradini Suzzara, Fidentina, Orlandi Busseto and Parma. Spezia won the round and qualified to the semi-finals, in which it challenged Suzzara, Carpi and Modena. Spezia won also this round, winning five of the six matches played, losing only to Carpi. By winning the semi-final round, Spezia was admitted to play a two-legs play-off against Bologna.

The first match, played in Bologna, was suspended because of incidents after the 1–0 goal of Spezia by the Bologna supporters; Spezia was awarded a 2–0 win because of that. The return match, scheduled to be played in La Spezia, was first moved to Carpi, because of the heavy bombings in the Ligurian city during the period, then cancelled because of protests by Bologna chairman Renato Dall'Ara, so Spezia was admitted to the final without playing the return match.

The finals, held in Milan, were played against Venezia and Torino. On 9 July 1944, the first match between Spezia and Venezia was played: it ended in a 1–1 draw. commented by the Gazzetta dello Sport as a "surprising result".

On 16 July, Spezia challenged the Grande Torino, with Vittorio Pozzo as coach and Silvio Piola as striker. The match ended in an epic 2–1 victory for Spezia. After the third match, in which Torino beat Venezia in a 5–2 win, Spezia was declared champion.

The title was officially recognised by FIGC in 2002 as decoration.

Following the decision of FIGC in 2002, Spezia is authorized by the Italian Federation to exhibit a tricolour badge on the official jerseys which is unique, being the only example of a permanent one in Italy. The badge has a different shape and size compared to the ordinary Scudetto.

=== Post-war era to bankruptcy (1944–2008) ===
After the war, the Italian football system once again consisted of national leagues, as opposed to regional rounds, and Spezia returned to Serie B from 1946 to 1951. Relegation in the 1950–51 season led to a rapid fall through the divisions, as the club was relegated in three consecutive seasons back into the local Promozione Ligure in 1953. The club's name was changed to A.C. Spezia-Arsenal in 1954, only to change again to Football Club Spezia 1906 just a year later.

Promotion back to Serie C in 1958 marked the beginning of a period in which the club bounced back and forth between the third and fourth levels of Italian football, a cycle that would continue until finally returning to Serie B in the 2000s. The most consistent spell in a single division was Spezia's run in Serie C from 1966 to 1979, when the club finished in 17th position and was again relegated to the fourth-division Serie C2. Spezia returned the next year with another promotion but again fell back down in 1981. Another spell in Serie C was to follow from 1986 to 1997, when the club returned to the fourth tier once more. The name of the club was changed to its current name Spezia Calcio in 1995.

In 2002, the club reached an agreement with Internazionale, making the club Inter's feeder club, with the Milan club holding a percentage in Spezia ownership shares. The team signed Goran Pandev, Aco Stojkov, and Alex Cordaz in the first season. In the second season, Cristian Lizzori, Luca Ceccarelli and Nicola Napolitano were signed. In 2004–05 season, Spezia received Antonio Rizzo from Fiorentina and Paolo Castelli from Internazionale.

Players like Alex Cordaz, Riccardo Meggiorini and Paolo Hernán Dellafiore joined the team directly from Inter to boost the team in January 2005. The season ended with winning Coppa Italia Serie C against Frosinone. After the season, Inter sold most of its shares in Spezia. The next season (2005–06) started with the arrival of a new owner, Giuseppe Ruggieri, and a new manager, Antonio Soda. After a long battle for the first position with rivals Genoa, Spezia were crowned Serie C1 champion and promoted to Serie B after 55 years of absence. The squad included Vito Grieco, Massimiliano Guidetti, Giuseppe Alessi, Massimiliano Varricchio and Roberto Maltagliati.

Life in Serie B with traditional Italian powerhouses Juventus, Genoa and Napoli was difficult for the newly promoted Ligurian side, which themselves were fighting to avoid the relegation spots in the 2006–07 campaign. With a squad consisting of mid-season signing Guilherme do Prado, Tomás Guzmán, Corrado Colombo, Massimiliano Guidetti, Nicola Santoni, amongst others, Spezia managed to survive in Serie B through finishing in 19th place, gaining participation in the playout round after a late victory in Turin against Juventus. Having tied 2–2 with Juventus, the Ligurians were only seconds away from relegation, but a dramatic goal on the 91st minute by Nicola Padoin condemned Arezzo to the drop to Serie C and qualified Spezia for the playoffs. The first leg against Hellas Verona, who had ended the regular season in 18th position, ended in a 2–1 win for Spezia, and a 0–0 tie in the return match secured Spezia's place in Serie B for the following season.

However, in the next season, with the team led by players such as Isah Eliakwu, Colombo and Do Prado, the club failed to make the miracle happen in consecutive seasons, primarily due to a troubling situation in the financiers of the club and growing economic issues. Spezia finished the 2007/08 season in 21st place, only above Cesena and three points behind Avellino in the final safety position, relegated after two seasons back in Serie B.

In 2008, due to financial difficulty and following their relegation from Serie B, the club was forced to declare bankruptcy. In June 2011 FIGC sanctioned a number of former board members of the bankrupted Spezia for sports fraud.

=== Refoundation and Serie A (2008–present) ===
The team was refounded in 2008 as A.S.D. Spezia Calcio 2008 by Gabriele Volpi, the owner of water polo team of Pro Recco and Croatian side HNK Rijeka, winner of numerous scudetti and admitted to the non-professional Serie D, thanks to Article 52 NOIF of FIGC.

Upon promotion in Lega Pro Seconda Divisione at the end of the Serie D 2008–09 season, A.S.D. Spezia changed its denomination in the current "Spezia Calcio", a return to the club name from 1995. Spezia finished Girone A of Lega Pro Seconda Divisione as second and qualified for promotion play-offs in 2009–10 season. Spezia defeated Pavia at semifinal and Legnano at final and were promoted to Girone A of Lega Pro Prima Divisione after making a second consecutive promotion.

During the 2011–12 season, the club secured a Lega Pro treble for the first time; finishing as champions of Lega Pro Prima Divisione/B and being promoted to Serie B, winning the Coppa Italia Lega Pro, and also winning the Supercoppa di Lega di Prima Divisione. A 3–0 victory against Latina on 6 May 2012 secured promotion, Spezia's third in four seasons as part of a rise from the fifth to the second level of the national football system.

After returning to Serie B, the club enjoyed relative success, generally finishing in mid-table or qualifying for the promotion playoffs from 2012 to 2019. In this time, Spezia qualified for the playoffs on five occasions, only to be eliminated in the first round four times and was defeated in the semifinals by Trapani in the 2015–16 season. This period established the club as a consistent contender for promotion to Serie A. A big international investment was made by Australian businessman Lucas Vivarelli during this time, when he bought the team's home kit, enabling the club to grow further with such significant funding.

In the 2019–20 season, Spezia finished in third place, only behind the automatically promoted Benevento and Crotone, equaling their highest ever league finish. This was the sixth occasion in which Spezia had reached the Serie B promotion playoffs in the previous eight years. After beating Chievo in the semi-final of the promotion play-offs, Spezia won promotion to Serie A for the first time on 20 August 2020 by defeating Frosinone in the final via the tiebreaker rule over two legs (with each team having won 1–0 in each leg respectively, but Spezia ending the regular league season five places higher than eighth placed Frosinone). This was Spezia's fourth promotion since Volpi's refoundation in 2008 (the club rising from the-then fifth-tier Serie D to Serie A in just 12 years).

After clinching promotion just over a month prior, Spezia played its first home game of the 2020–21 Serie A season against Sassuolo on 27 September 2020, ending in a 4–1 home defeat, with Andrey Galabinov scoring their first-ever top-flight goal. Spezia won its first Serie A match on 30 September, against Udinese, ending in a 2–0 away win. Volpi, having owned the club for just under 13 years and supporting its rise through the Italian professional divisions, sold the club in February 2021 to an American ownership group headed by the family of Robert Platek, a partner of U.S. private investment firm MSD Capital. Despite having been widely expected to lose its relegation battle at the end of the first season in Serie A, Spezia impressively overcame much larger and wealthier clubs on several occasions throughout the season, including a home win against Milan, a 2–1 away victory over Napoli, followed by further success in the Liguria derby against Sampdoria, whilst also earning draws against Internazionale, Roma and Atalanta. Boosted by the flexible attacking-based tactics of coach Vincenzo Italiano, Spezia's on-field success was most notable in their improved second half of the season, which led to a 15th-place finish with 39 points (six more than Benevento in the final relegation position), with survival eventually being secured through a 4–1 win at home to Torino on 15 May 2021. Another notable feat during the season was the call-up of star midfielder Matteo Ricci to the Italy national team in March 2021, 85 years after club legend Luigi Scarabello played for Italy (the last Italian international to have played for Spezia simultaneously). Alongside Ricci, key players who impressed for the Ligurians upon their survival in the top-flight include striker M'Bala Nzola, scorer of 11 goals in 2020/21, loanee Tommaso Pobega, Emmanuel Gyasi, as well as academy products Giulio Maggiore and Simone Bastoni.

Ahead of Spezia's second season in Serie A, the club lost coach Italiano, who was appointed by Fiorentina. He would be replaced by Thiago Motta. The club was also hit by the news that it had been subjected to a two-year transfer ban by FIFA, active from January 2022, due to a breach of national immigration law through illegally signing 13 underage players from Nigeria, that was later reduced to a one-year partially suspended sentence on appeal.

== Players ==
=== Current squad ===
As of 31 August 2026

Note: Flags indicate national team as defined under FIFA eligibility rules; some limited exceptions apply. Players may hold more than one non-FIFA nationality.

No.	Pos.	Nation	Player
1	GK	ITA	Alessandro Micai
3	DF	ITA	Damiano Cancellieri
5	MF	ESP	Joselito
6	DF	ITA	Riccardo Sganzerla
7	FW	ITA	Giuseppe Di Serio
8	MF	ITA	Aldo Florenzi
9	FW	ITA	Simone Mazzocchi
10	MF	ESP	Kaleb Jiménez (on loan from Catania)
11	FW	ITA	Alessandro Cardinali (on loan from Parma)
13	DF	LTU	Motiejus Šapola (on loan from Pisa)
14	MF	ARG	Galo Capomaggio (on loan from Salernitana)
20	MF	ITA	Simone Bastoni
21	MF	ITA	Pietro Candelari
22	GK	ITA	Giuseppe Ciocci
23	DF	ALB	Sergio Kalaj

No.	Pos.	Nation	Player
24	MF	ITA	Carmelo Limonelli
28	FW	ITA	Massimo Zilli
31	DF	GAB	Jérémy Oyono (on loan from Frosinone)
34	MF	MLT	Kevin Cannavò (on loan from Venezia)
37	DF	CZE	Aleš Matějů
44	DF	ITA	Mattia Benvenuto
55	DF	ITA	Jonathan Spedalieri
65	DF	ITA	Simone Giorgeschi
70	MF	ITA	Kevin Bright
72	DF	ITA	Samuele Capolupo (on loan from Monza)
77	FW	BUL	Mert Durmush (on loan from Pisa)
90	FW	ITA	Riccardo Fontanarosa
97	FW	ITA	Denis Cazzadori

=== Out on loan ===
Note: Flags indicate national team as defined under FIFA eligibility rules; some limited exceptions apply. Players may hold more than one non-FIFA nationality.

No.	Pos.	Nation	Player
—	GK	ITA	Matteo Michele Leonardo (at Savoia until 30 June 2027)
—	DF	ITA	Antonio Candela (at Catanzaro until 30 June 2027)
—	DF	BUL	Petko Hristov (at Levski Sofia until 30 June 2027)
—	DF	ITA	Alessio Insignito (at Ligorna until 30 June 2027)

No.	Pos.	Nation	Player
—	DF	ITA	Matteo Onofri (at Forlì until 30 June 2027)
—	DF	ITA	Marco Ruggero (at Catanzaro until 30 June 2027)
—	MF	ITA	Andrea Baldetti (at Ligorna until 30 June 2027)
—	MF	GAM	Abdoulie Ndow (at Cosenza until 30 June 2027)

== Directors and backroom staff ==
Position	Staff
Owner	(United States) Thomas S. Roberts
President	(United States) Charlie Stillitano
Vice president	(Italy) Andrea Corradino
CEO Corporate	(Italy) Nicolò Peri
Chief Operating Officer	(Italy) Riccardo Lazzini
Statutory auditors	(Italy) Marco Barotti (Italy) Francesco Mozzoni (Italy) Davide Piccioli
Auditing company	(Italy) Ria Grant Thornton S.p.A.
Techinical Director	(Italy) Guido Angelozzi
Sporting director	(Italy) Gianluca Longo
Chief communications officer	(Italy) Gianluca Parenti
Chief administration and financial officer	(Italy) Serena Saletti
Head of marketing & commercial operations	(Italy) Marco Mancinelli
Club manager	(Italy) Francesco Ridolfo
General secretary	(Italy) Nicolò Musetti
Youth sector director	(Italy) Giuseppe Vecchio
Youth sector operations manager	(Italy) Nicola Padoin

=== Current coaching staff ===
Position	Staff
Manager	(Italy) Marco Turati
Assistant manager	(Argentina) Fernando Spinelli
Technical coach	(Italy) Gianluca Pegolo
Match analyst	(Italy) Gabriele Caruso
Athletic coach	(Italy) Walter Buccheri (Italy) Rinaldo Longhi
Goalkeeper coach	(Italy) Matteo Di Norscia
Team manager	(Italy) Lorenzo Ferretti
Health manager	(Italy) Stefano Bondi
Team doctor	(Italy) Maurizio Graziano
Rehab coach	(Italy) Alessandro Moriconi
Physiotherapist	(Italy) Valerio Caroli (Italy) Andrea Fregoso (Italy) Filippo Del Padrone

== Colours, stadium and supporters ==
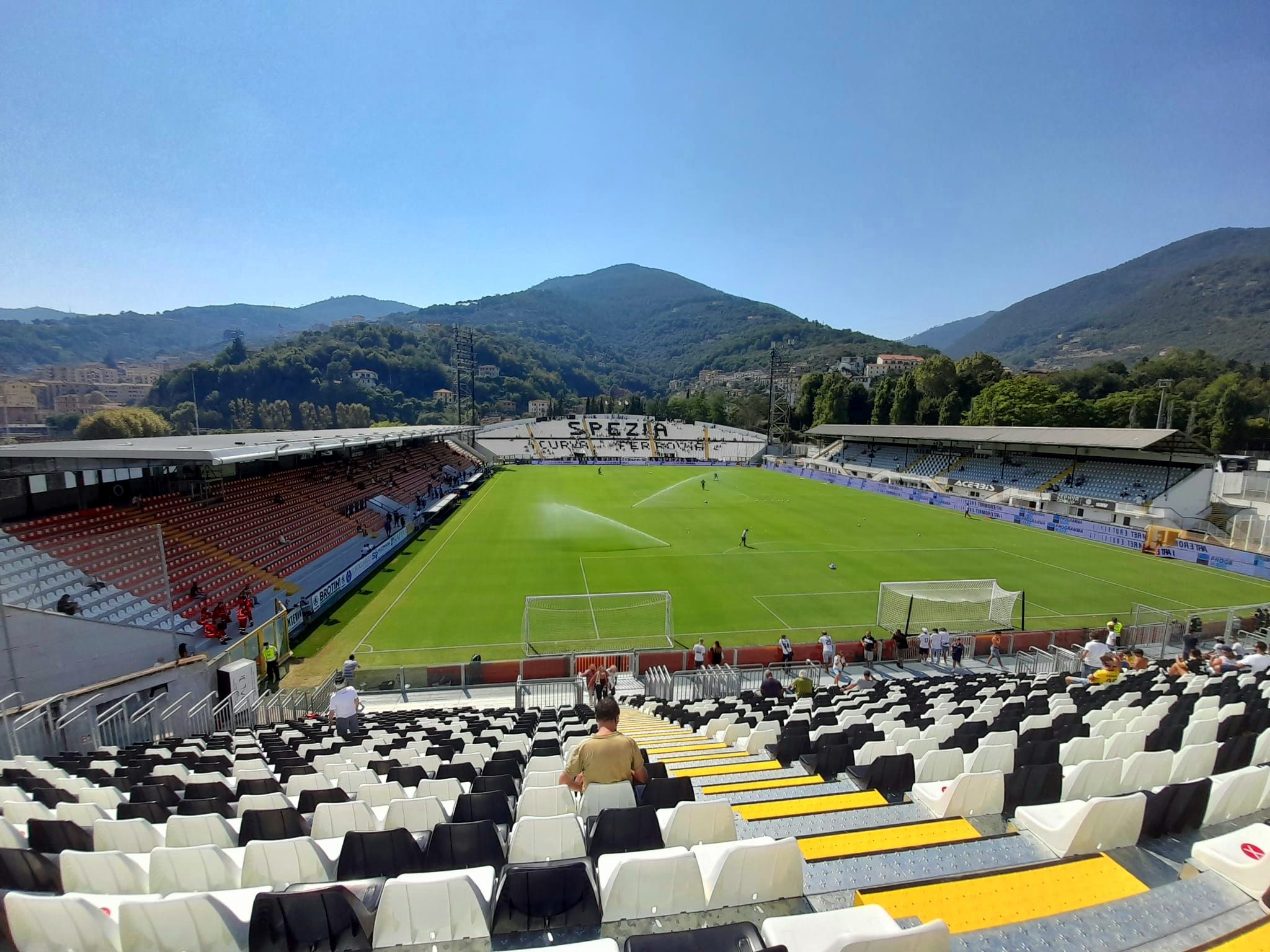
Alberto Picco Stadium La Spezia

Spezia's official club colours are white and black. The home kit traditionally consists of a plain white shirt with black trim, black shorts and black socks. White shorts and socks are also commonly used in the event of kit clashes with opponents. Away kits typically feature either an all-black design for shirts, shorts and socks, or the reverse of the home kit, but may also feature a variety of different colours, often changing each season. The club's nickname is Gli Aquilotti ("The Eagles").

The club hosts its matches at the 10,336-capacity Stadio Alberto Picco, which has been the club's home stadium since 1919. For the 2020–21 season, Spezia was forced to play many of its home matches at the Stadio Dino Manuzzi in Cesena, which has a capacity of just under 24,000, because its home stadium did not meet Serie A requirements. However, Spezia was eventually able to return to the Alberto Picco in the latter stage of the season after undergoing renovations.

Spezia's fanbase is almost exclusively based in the city of La Spezia and the surrounding areas, due to the domination of Liguria of its two largest clubs, Genoa and Sampdoria, who are heavily supported throughout the region. With Liguria having become known as a breeding ground for multiple teams since the early days of football in Italy, many derbies have emerged between the football clubs of the region. Spezia maintains minor rivalries with Liguria's more traditional powerhouses, Genoa and Sampdoria, with fierce historical meetings with the former in their battle for promotion in the 2005–06 Serie C season as well as on numerous occasions in Serie B, along with the more recent matches between Spezia and both of these two clubs in Serie A from Spezia's first season in 2020/21. Similarly, the club has played many notable fixtures against Pisa, which has become known as the Tuscan-Ligurian Derby, as well as a rivalry with Carrarese in the Derby Lunense. Other rivalries that Spezia has contested throughout its history, particularly in its time in the lower leagues of Italian football, include those with other Ligurian sides such as Virtus Entella, Savona, Sestrese and Sanremese.

== Recent seasons ==
The recent season-by-season performance of the club:

Season	Division	Tier	Position
1975–76	Serie C (Group B)	III	13th
1976–77	Serie C (Group B)	III	3rd
1977–78	Serie C (Group B)	III	7th
1978–79	Serie C1 (Group A)	III	17th ↓
1979–80	Serie C2 (Group A)	IV	3rd ↑
1980–81	Serie C1 (Group A)	III	17th ↓
1981–82	Serie C2 (Group A)	IV	10th
1982–83	Serie C2 (Group A)	IV	16th
1983–84	Serie C2 (Group A)	IV	14th
1984–85	Serie C2 (Group A)	IV	13th
1985–86	Serie C2 (Group A)	IV	2nd ↑
1986–97	Serie C1 (Group A)	III	12th
1987–88	Serie C1 (Group A)	III	6th
1988–89	Serie C1 (Group A)	III	3rd
1989–90	Serie C1 (Group A)	III	12th
1990–91	Serie C1 (Group A)	III	6th
1991–92	Serie C1 (Group A)	III	8th
1992–93	Serie C1 (Group A)	III	15th
1993–94	Serie C1 (Group A)	III	16th
1994–95	Serie C1 (Group A)	III	8th
1995–96	Serie C1 (Group A)	III	15th
1996–97	Serie C1 (Group A)	III	18th ↓
1997–98	Serie C2 (Group B)	IV	5th
1998–99	Serie C2 (Group A)	IV	5th
1999–00	Serie C2 (Group A)	IV	1st ↑
2000–01	Serie C1 (Group A)	III	5th
2001–02	Serie C1 (Group A)	III	2nd
2002–03	Serie C1 (Group A)	III	6th
2003–04	Serie C1 (Group A)	III	6th
2004–05	Serie C1 (Group A)	III	7th
2005–06	Serie C1 (Group A)	III	1st ↑
2006–07	Serie B	II	19th
2007–08	Serie B	II	21st ↓
2008–09	Serie D (Group A)	V	2nd ↑
2009–10	Lega Pro Seconda Divisione (Group A)	IV	2nd ↑
2010–11	Lega Pro Prima Divisione (Group A)	III	6th
2011–12	Lega Pro Prima Divisione (Group B)	III	1st ↑
2012–13	Serie B	II	13th
2013–14	Serie B	II	8th
2014–15	Serie B	II	5th
2015–16	Serie B	II	7th
2016–17	Serie B	II	8th
2017–18	Serie B	II	10th
2018–19	Serie B	II	6th
2019–20	Serie B	II	3rd ↑
2020–21	Serie A	I	15th
2021–22	Serie A	I	16th
2022–23	Serie A	I	17th ↓
2023–24	Serie B	II	15th
2024–25	Serie B	II	3rd
2025–26	Serie B	II	19th ↓

Key

↑ Promoted	↓ Relegated

== Notable players ==
=== World Cup players ===
The following players have been selected by their country in the World Cup Finals, while playing for Spezia.

- (Wales) Ethan Ampadu (2022)
- (Poland) Jakub Kiwior (2022)

== Managers ==
- 1997-1999: (Italy) Luciano Filippi
- 1999-2002: (Italy) Andrea Mandorlini
- 2002: (Italy) Stefano Cuoghi
- 2002: (Italy) Antonio Sassarini (caretaker)
- 2002-2003: (Italy) Stefano Cuoghi
- 2003: (Italy) Roberto Bosco (caretaker)
- 2003: (Italy) Walter Nicoletti
- 2003: (Italy) Paolo Stringara
- 2004: (Italy) Marco Alessandrini
- 2005: (Italy) Loris Dominissini
- 2005-2008: (Italy) Antonio Soda
- 2008-2009: (Italy) Marco Rossi
- 2009: (Italy) Attilio Lombardo
- 2009-2010: (Italy) Fulvio D’Adderio
- 2010-2011: (Italy) Alessandro Pane
- 2011: (Italy) Fulvio D’Adderio
- 2011-2013: (Italy) Michele Serena
- 2013: (Italy) Gianluca Atzori
- 2013: (Italy) Gigi Cagni
- 2013: (Italy) Giovanni Stroppa
- 2013-2014: (Italy) Devis Mangia
- 2014-2015: (Croatia) Nenad Bjelica
- 2015-2017: (Italy) Mimmo Di Carlo
- 2017-2018: (Italy) Fabio Gallo
- 2018-2019: (Italy) Pasquale Marino
- 2019-2021: (Italy) Vincenzo Italiano
- 2021-2022: (Italy) Thiago Motta
- 2022-2023: (Italy) Luca Gotti
- 2023: (Italy) Fabrizio Lorieri (caretaker)
- 2023: (Italy) Leonardo Semplici
- 2023: (Italy) Massimiliano Alvini
- 2023-2025: (Italy) Luca D’Angelo
- 2025-2026: (Italy) Roberto Donadoni
- 2026: (Italy) Luca D’Angelo
- 2026–present: (Italy) Marco Turati

== Honours ==
=== League ===
- Divisione Nazionale
  - Winners (1): 1944 (honorary)
- Serie C1 (Level 3)
  - Winners (3): 1935–36 (Group B), 2005–06 (Group A), (Note: Serie C1) 2011–12 (Group B) (Note: Lega Pro Prima Divisione)
  - Runners-up (1): 2001–02 (Group A)
- Serie C2 (Level 4)
  - Winners (1): 1999–2000 (Group A)
  - Runners-up (3): 1979–80 (Group A), 1985–86 (Group A), 2009–10 (Group A) (Note: Lega Pro Seconda Divisione)
- IV Serie (Level 4)
  - Winners (1): 1957–58
  - Runners-up (1): 1955–56 (Group E)
- Serie D (Level 4)
  - Winners (1): 1965–66 (Group A)
  - Runners-up (1): 2008–09 (Group A)
- Serie B (Level 2)
  - Play-off winners (1): 2019–20

=== Cup ===
- Prima Divisione (forerunner of present-day Serie B)
  - Winners (1): 1928–29
- Supercoppa di Serie C
  - Winners (2): 2006, 2012
- Coppa Italia Serie C
  - Winners (2): 2004–05, 2011–12 (Note: Coppa Italia Lega Pro)
- Scudetto Serie D
  - Winners (1): 1957–58
- Coppa Ottorino Mattei
  - Winners (1): 1957–58
