= Toni Markić =

Bosnian-Herzegovinian football player (born 1990)

Personal information
- Date of birth: 25 October 1990 (age 36)
- Place of birth: Ljubuški, Yugoslavia
- Height: 1.90 m (6 ft 3 in)
- Position: Defender

Team information
- Current team: Ancona

Youth career
- –2009: Zagreb

Senior career*
Years	Team	Apps	(Gls)
2009	Borac Banja Luka	10	(0)
2010	Široki Brijeg	13	(0)
2011–2013	Zrinjski Mostar	46	(1)
2013	Olimpik	7	(0)
2014–2016	KuPS	56	(5)
2016	Zawisza Bydgoszcz	8	(0)
2017	Cibalia	5	(0)
2017–2019	Bisceglie	68	(2)
2019–2021	Viterbese	39	(1)
2021–2023	Foggia	7	(0)
2023–2024	Siracusa	15	(0)
2024–2025	Scafatese	19	(2)
2026–	Ancona	1	(0)

International career
2008–2009	Bosnia and Herzegovina U19	13	(0)
2011–2012	Bosnia and Herzegovina U21	12	(0)
- * Club domestic league appearances and goals as of 1 March 2026

Toni Markić (born 25 October 1990) is a Bosnian footballer who plays as a defender for Italian Serie D club Ancona.

== Club career ==
He made his Veikkausliiga debut for KuPS on 12 April 2014 in a game against HJK.

On 26 July 2019, he signed with Viterbese.

On 7 August 2021 he joined Foggia on a two-year contract.

== International career ==
Markić was a youth international for Bosnia and Herzegovina U19 and Bosnia and Herzegovina U21.

== Career statistics ==
As of 27 November 2024.

Appearances and goals by club, season and competition
Club	Season	League			Cup (Note: Includes Bosnian Cup, Suomen Cup, Polish Cup and Coppa Italia)		League cup (Note: Includes Finnish League Cup, Coppa Italia Serie C and Coppa Italia Serie D)		Europe		Total	
Club	Season	Division	Apps	Goals	Apps	Goals	Apps	Goals	Apps	Goals	Apps	Goals
Borac Banja Luka	2009–10	Bosnian Premier League	10	0	–		–		–		10	0
Široki Brijeg	2009–10	Bosnian Premier League	10	0	–		–		–		10	0
Široki Brijeg	2010–11	Bosnian Premier League	3	0	1	0	–		1 (Note: Appearance(s) in UEFA Europa League)	0	5	0
Široki Brijeg	Total		13	0	1	0	0	0	1	0	15	0
Zrinjski Mostar	2010–11	Bosnian Premier League	12	0	–		–		–		12	0
Zrinjski Mostar	2011–12	Bosnian Premier League	20	1	0	0	–		–		20	1
Zrinjski Mostar	2012–13	Bosnian Premier League	13	0	3	0	–		–		16	0
Zrinjski Mostar	Total		45	1	3	0	0	0	0	0	48	1
Olimpik	2012–13	Bosnian Premier League	7	0	–		–		–		7	0
KuPS	2014	Veikkausliiga	29	3	3	1	3	0	–		35	4
KuPS	2015	Veikkausliiga	27	2	4	0	3	0	–		34	2
KuPS	Total		56	5	7	1	6	0	0	0	69	6
Zawisza Bydgoszcz	2015–16	I liga	8	0	2	0	–		–		10	0
Cibalia	2016–17	1. HNL	5	0	–		–		–		5	0
Bisceglie	2017–18	Serie C	30	1	–		2	0	–		32	1
Bisceglie	2018–19	Serie C	37	1	–		1	0	–		38	1
Bisceglie	Total		67	2	0	0	3	0	0	0	70	2
Viterbese	2019–20	Serie C	20	0	1	0	–		–		21	0
Viterbese	2020–21	Serie C	19	1	–		–		–		19	1
Viterbese	Total		39	1	1	0	0	0	0	0	40	1
Foggia	2021–22	Serie C	5	0	–		1	0	–		6	0
Foggia	2022–23	Serie C	4	1	–		0	0	–		4	1
Foggia	Total		9	1	0	0	1	0	0	0	10	1
Siracusa	2023–24	Serie D	15	0	–		1	0	–		16	0
Scafatese	2024–25	Serie D	11	1	–		1	0	–		12	1
Career total			285	11	14	1	12	0	1	0	312	12
