= Orazio Sorbello =

Italian footballer

Personal information
- Date of birth: 10 August 1959 (age 67)
- Place of birth: Acireale, Italy
- Positions: Midfielder; striker

Youth career
- 1970–1978: Acireale

Senior career*
Years	Team	Apps	(Gls)
1978–1980	Acireale	53	(11)
1980–1984	Campania Ponticelli	123	(46)
1984–1985	Padova	35	(7)
1985–1986	Palermo	31	(9)
1986–1987	Catania	30	(7)
1987–1989	Modena	54	(11)
1989–1991	Avellino	68	(18)
1991–1992	Pescara	22	(4)
1992–1995	Acireale	80	(21)
1995–1996	Atletico Catania	26	(1)
1996-1998	Ħamrun Spartans	30	(5)
Total		552	(140)

Managerial career
- 1996-1997: Ħamrun Spartans (player/man.)
- 1998-1999: Siracusa
- 2004-2005: Acireale
- * Club domestic league appearances and goals

Orazio Sorbello (born 10 August 1959 in Italy) is an Italian retired football player and manager.

Sorbelo was replaced by Patrick Curmi as manager of Maltese top-tier side Ħamrun Spartans in 1997.
