= AS Siracusa =

Association football club in Italy

Siracusa
- Full name: Associazione Sportiva Siracusa S.r.l.
- Nicknames: Azzurri (All-Blues); Aretusei
- Founded: 1937
- Dissolved: 1995
- Ground: Stadio Nicola De Simone

Associazione Sportiva Siracusa was an Italian football club founded in 1937. In 1995 the first team of the club was withdrawn from the professional leagues. A phoenix youth academy lasted until circa 2005, as a new company A.S. Siracusa Calcio 1924 S.r.l., with an illigimate foundation year.

== History ==
=== The forerunners ===
The earliest clubs representing the city of Syracuse were brought to the city by English sailors. The earliest of which were named Ortigia 1907; as the name suggests that club was founded in 1907, Esperia and Insuperabile. However, cycling remained the most popular sport by far during this time so these clubs did not reach much prominence. Gruppo Sportivo Tommaso Gargallo was founded on 1 April 1924, by two men who were part of the military, the lieutenant of the 75° infantry Genisio Pioletti and his advanced captain Luigi Santuccio.

=== A.S. Siracusa ===
Associazione Sportiva Siracusa was founded in 1937. The club soon were entered into the Italian Serie C league.

In 1945–46, Siracusa was admitted to Serie B, where he played for seven consecutive seasons. After a relegation to the amateur leagues, Siracusa returned to Serie C in 1970–71, after two playoffs against Fincantieri, a team from Palermo, both ended in a tie: then, Siracusa won a tie-breaking coin toss and was awarded promotion.

In 1979 the club won Coppa Italia Serie C, defeating Biellese in the final. That same year, Siracusa promoted to Serie C1, where he played for two seasons. In the 1970s the club also briefly used the name Siracusa Calcio. In 1985 the club went bankrupted, but the sports title was transferred to another company backed by new investors.

Siracusa played Serie C2 until 1988, when, under coach Paolo Lombardo, the Sicilian club gained promotion to Serie C1. In 1994–95, despite serious financial troubles, Siracusa almost reached promotion to Serie B under head coach Giuliano Sonzogni, losing on playoffs to Avellino. Successively, the team was not able to go on financially, and Siracusa was consequently expelled from professional league, by the decision of Italian Football Federation's Commissione di Vigilanza sulle Società di Calcio (Co.Vi.So.C.). The last financial filing of A.S. Siracusa S.r.l. (P.IVA 00822900890), dated 1993–94 season, shown the club had a net equity of minus 1,511,222,632 lire. The old club/company, last known as A.S. Siracusa Calcio S.r.l. [sic] , was officially declared bankrupted by the Court of Syracuse on 6 February 1996. Associazione Amici del Siracusa, a cultural association, currently owned the rights to use the logo and the name of the club. Paolo Giuliano, the general manager of Messina, was the president of the association. However, no football club submitted any tender to use the logo for 2014–15 season.

== Stadium ==
Their first stadium was Campo Coloniale from their inception until it was demolished in 1932. The present stadium, Stadio Nicola De Simone can hold 5,946.

== Phoenix clubs ==
=== A.S. Siracusa Calcio 1924 ===
However, the phoenix youth section of the club was survived, as A.S. Siracusa Calcio 1924, which the membership of the that youth academy in FIGC was finally cancelled circa 2006 (FIGC registration number: 910391). The club also had to follow the naming conversion of amateur football club, which became A.S.D. Siracusa Calcio 1924 in 2004–05 season, the final season of the club in the football field.

In the last season, 2004–05, their under-17 team finished as the second from the bottom of Siracusa Provincial Allievi League Group B, only higher than a team that withdrew in mid-season; the under-15 team finished as the runner-up in Siracusa Provincial Giovanissimi League Group C. In 2005–06 season, A.S. Siracusa Calcio 1924 withdrew their youth teams. It was replaced by U.S. Siracusa's under-14 team in the provincial giovanissimi league; U.S. Siracusa under-15 team was in National Giovanissimi League – Serie D Division.

=== Other ===
Football team from Siracusa that participated in adult football league:

- U.S. Siracusa: 1995–2012
- A.S.D. Città di Siracusa: 2012–13
- A.S.D. Sport Club Siracusa / A.S.D. Città di Siracusa / Siracusa Calcio S.r.l.: 2013–

== Honours ==
- Serie C:
  - Winner (1): 1940–41 (group stage)
  - Promoted (1): 1945–46
- Coppa Italia Serie C:
  - Winners (1): 1978–79
- Serie C2:
  - Runners-up (2): 1978–79; 1988–89
- Serie D / I Divisione:
  - Winner (1): 1970–71 (group stage)
  - Promoted (1): 1937–38; 1970–71
