= Phoenix club =

Phoenix club or Phoenix Club may refer to:

- Phoenix club (sports), a sports team formed as a successor to a defunct club
- Phoenix Club, a traditional gentlemen's club and historic building in Cincinnati, Ohio
- The Phoenix Club, a fictional working men's club in Farnworth, Greater Manchester, the setting for Peter Kay's Phoenix Nights
- Phoenix Cricket Club, a cricket club in Dublin, Ireland
- The Phoenix – S K Club, an undergraduate organization at Harvard College
- Phoenix F.C. Navan Road, a football club in Dublin, Ireland
- Phoenix SC, a soccer team in Feasterville, Pennsylvania
- Phoenix Club (Terre Haute, Indiana), a clubhouse building listed on the National Register of Historic Places
