= Fabio Sonzogni =

Italian actor and theatre director

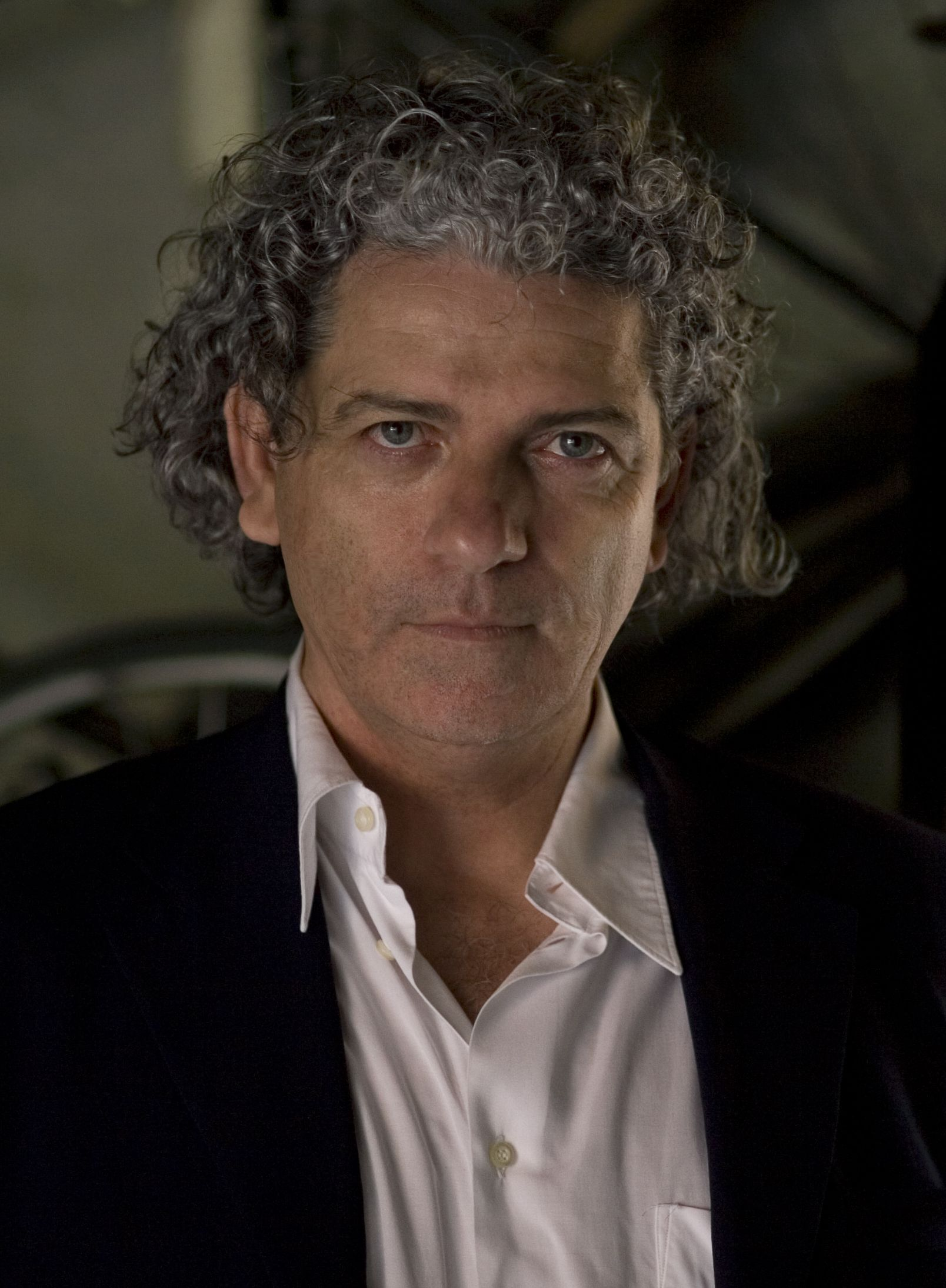
- Born: Fabio Sonzogni; 1963 (age 62–63); Bergamo, Italy
- Occupations: Film director, theatre director, actor
- Years active: 2000–present

Fabio Sonzogni (born 1963) is an Italian film and theatre director and actor.

== Life and career ==
He has worked as an actor for fifteen years with directors: Luca Ronconi, Dario Fo, Gabriele Lavia, Mario Martone, Antonio Syxty, Antonio Latella. Since 2000 he has been working as a director. On February 21, 2014 in Florence, Teatro Cantiere Florida, he is performing and directing Sunset Limited, by Cormac McCarthy. In July 2014 he is taking part to the Festival of Gibellina-Orestiadi, with his new play Come pietra paziente, acting Nabhia Akkari.In November 2014, he will perform Cormac McCarthy's The Road. He is now working on his next short film, Reborn Baby, as well as the play The Face of Maria, a monologue for voice and body of a woman situated in London. In July he will be the artistic manager of the Siloe Film Festival, in Tuscany.

His short film Concrete Leaves, inspired by one of Mc Ewan’s short story, has participated in 35 international festivals and winning 7 of them, such as: Rotterdam Film Fest, Dresda Film Festival, Cork Film Festival, Genova Film Festival, Cinecittà Roma Festival and inviting to international reviews in New York, London, Paris, Madrid and Dresda .

== Theatre productions ==
- The Sunset Limited, by Cormac McCarthy, with Fausto Iheme Caroli and Fabio Sonzogni. Elsinor - 2013
- Orgia, by Pier Paolo Pasolini, with Sabrina Colle (Sara Bertelà), Giovanni Franzoni (Fabio Sonzogni) and Silvia Pernarella. (Teatro Out-Off) Teatro Sala Fontana, Milano - 2011–2012
- Antigone, by Sofocle, with Cristina Spina e Gabriele Parrillo. Regione Puglia - 2010
- Le Baccanti, by Euripide, with Giovanni Franzoni, Gabriele Parrillo, Teresa Saponangelo. Regione Puglia - 2009
- C'era una nave..., by many authors, with Franco Branciaroli, Festival DeSidera - 2008
- Ogni cosa era più antica dell'uomo e vibrava di mistero, (from The road by Cormac McCarthy), with Laura Marinoni, Festival DeSidera - 2008
- Medea, by Euripide, with Caterina Deregibus, prod. Teatro Stabile di Firenze - 2007
- Edipo re, by Sofocle, with Franco Pistoni, Compagnia Elsinor - 2006
- Misura per misura, by William Shakespeare, with Gabriele Parrillo, Giovanni Franzoni and Cristina Spina, Compagnia Elsinor - 2005
- Cantiere: Misura per misura, by William Shakespeare, with Gabriele Parrillo, Giovanni Franzoni and Cristina Spina, SiparioFilmProduction and Fabrica, Ex Italcementi di Alzano Lombardo (Bg) - 2004
- Doppio sogno, by Arthur Schnitzler, with Gabriele Parrillo and Camilla Frontini, Teatro Stabile di Firenze - 2000
