= Giuliano Sonzogni =

Italian football manager (born 1949)

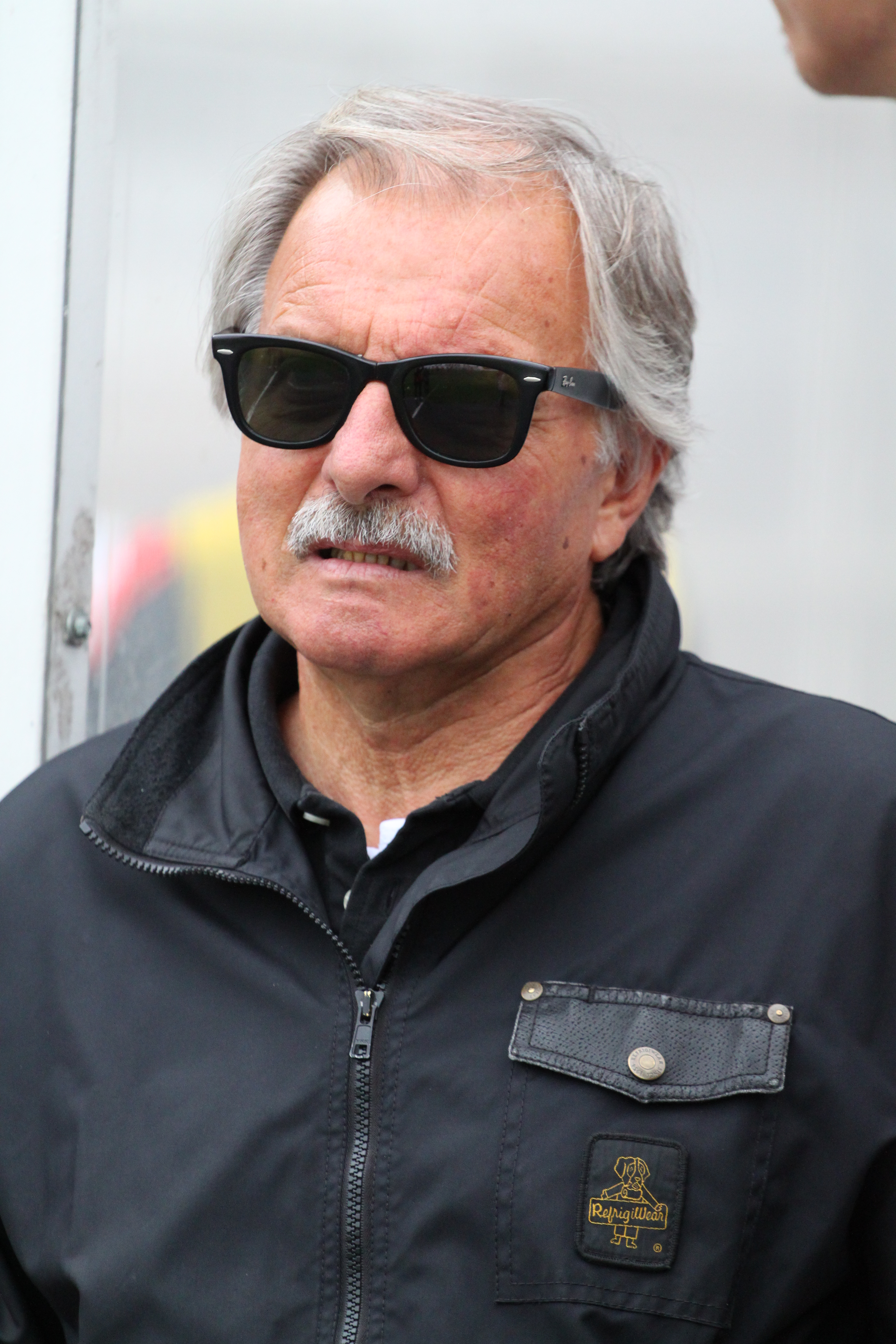

Personal information
- Date of birth: 2 February 1949 (age 77)
- Place of birth: Zogno, Italy

Managerial career
- Years: Team
- 1978–1988: Pontisola
- 1988–1990: Virescit Boccaleone
- 1990–1991: Verona
- 1991–1992: Licata
- 1992–1993: Salernitana
- 1993–1995: A.S. Siracusa
- 1995–1996: Fidelis Andria
- 1996–1997: Gualdo
- 1997–1999: Cosenza
- 1999–2000: Lugano
- 2000–2001: Palermo
- 2001–2002: Avellino
- 2002–2004: Real Spal
- 2005–2007: Monza
- 2008–2009: Monza
- 2009–2010: U.S. Siracusa
- 2011–2012: Alessandria
- 2012: Botev Vratsa
- 2014: Ciliverghe Mazzano

Giuliano Sonzogni (born 2 February 1949) is an Italian football manager. He has managed the Bulgarian football club Botev Vratsa, among others.
