= US Siracusa =

Association football club in Italy

Siracusa
- Full name: Unione Sportiva Siracusa S.r.l.
- Nicknames: Azzurri (All-Blues); Aretusei
- Founded: 1956 (as Aldo Marcozzi); 1996 (rename)
- Dissolved: 2012 (first team); 2014 (youth teams)
- Ground: Stadio Nicola De Simone, Syracuse
- Capacity: 5,946

Unione Sportiva Siracusa, commonly referred to as simply Siracusa, was an Italian association football club located in Syracuse, Sicily.

The club withdrew from professional football in 2012. An illegitimate phoenix club, was promoted to Lega Pro in 2016 as Siracusa Calcio (known as A.S.D. Città di Siracusa from 2014 to 2016 and Sport Club Siracusa from 2013 to 2014). Another illegitimate phoenix club, also known as A.S.D. Città di Siracusa, lasted for only one season from 2012 to 2013.

U.S. Siracusa itself was an illegitimate phoenix club of A.S. Siracusa, which was an illegitimate phoenix club of C.S. Tommaso Gargallo.

== History ==
U.S. Siracusa was an illegitimate heir of A.S. Siracusa, which focused on youth football from 1995, until folded circa 2006.

=== U.S. Siracusa ===
Unione Sportiva Aldo Marcozzi 1956 was a team from Syracuse. Circa 1991 the team became a S.r.l. with a P.IVA 01007200890. The team played in 1995–96 Promozione Sicily (7-tier at that time). In 1996 the club switched the name to Unione Sportiva Dilettanti Siracusa S.r.l., as the major team representing the city in senior football, after the expel of A.S. Siracusa from the professional league in 1995. However, one of the affiliated youth club of U.S. Siracusa, was remained to use the name Aldo Marcozzi at least until 2004–05 season. That season, Aldo Marcozzi finished as the fourth of Group B of Siracusa Provincial Allievi League, while A.S. Siracusa finished as the eighth. U.S. Siracusa's under-17 team was played in National Allievi League – Serie D Division that season.

The team reached Serie D in 1999 (fifth tier at that time), but quickly relegated back to Eccellenza Sicily. Siracusa returned to play Serie D in 2002; since then, the Sicilian team unsuccessfully tried to reach a spot into professional football until 2009, when they dominated the Group I of Serie D, getting finally promoted back to Lega Pro Seconda Divisione (ex-Serie C2) in advance of six weeks, after a 2–0 home win to Rosarno in front of 5,000 local supporters. After the promotion the club dropped the word "amateur" (Italian: dilettanti) from the denomination, to become Unione Sportiva Siracusa S.r.l..

In their first season back into professionalism, Siracusa have re-appointed Giuliano Sonzogni as head coach; fan favourite Sonzogni had already served as head coach in what then proved to be the most successful season in the club history, in 1994–95 (as A.S. Siracusa).

During the 2011–12 season, headed by coach Andrea Sottil, at his first season into professional football, Siracusa actually won the Lega Pro Prima Divisione by earning more points than any other team in that year. However, due to financial troubles again, instead of being directly promoted to Serie B, U.S. Siracusa was inflicted a penalty of 5 points in the same season, which caused the relegation of the club to a final third position. Losing then the play-off semifinal to Lanciano did not help with their promotion to Serie B after almost six decades.

After the end of the 2011–12 season, U.S. Siracusa did not appeal against the exclusion by the federal council of Italian Football Federation (FIGC) and it is excluded by the Italian professional football.

However, U.S. Siracusa's youth teams were still allowed to play in 2012–13 season, as well as retaining the registration number of the club: 79957. Their Giovanissimi team relegated from Sicilian Giovanissimi League directly; while their Allievi team finished as the fourth of Group H of Sicilian Allievi League . In the next season the Allievi team finished as the 11th of Group E. However, 2 positions higher than the illegitimate heir, Sport Club Siracusa. U.S. Siracusa also applied a dormant status by withdraw the youth teams from the league from 2014 onward.

== Legacy ==
On 31 August 2012, an illegitimate phoenix club was restarted from Terza Categoria – Syracuse Province as A.S.D. Città di Siracusa (registration number: 936289). The club was dissolved in 2013, and S.C. Siracusa / A.S.D. Città di Siracusa / Siracusa Calcio (registration number: 917156) took over as the main football club of the city.

== Colours and badge ==
The colours of the team are sky blue and white.

== Stadium ==
U.S. Siracusa's first team played in Stadio Nicola De Simone which can hold 5,946 people.

== Honours ==
- Serie D:
  - Promoted (1): 2008–09
- Eccellenza Sicily:
  - Winners (1): 1997–98
  - Promoted (1): 2001–02
- Promozione Sicily:
  - Promoted (1): 1995–96
