= Stadio Nicola De Simone =

Football stadium in Syracuse, Sicily

Coordinates: 37.0743°N 15.2913°E

Stadio Nicola de Simone
- Fossa dei Leoni
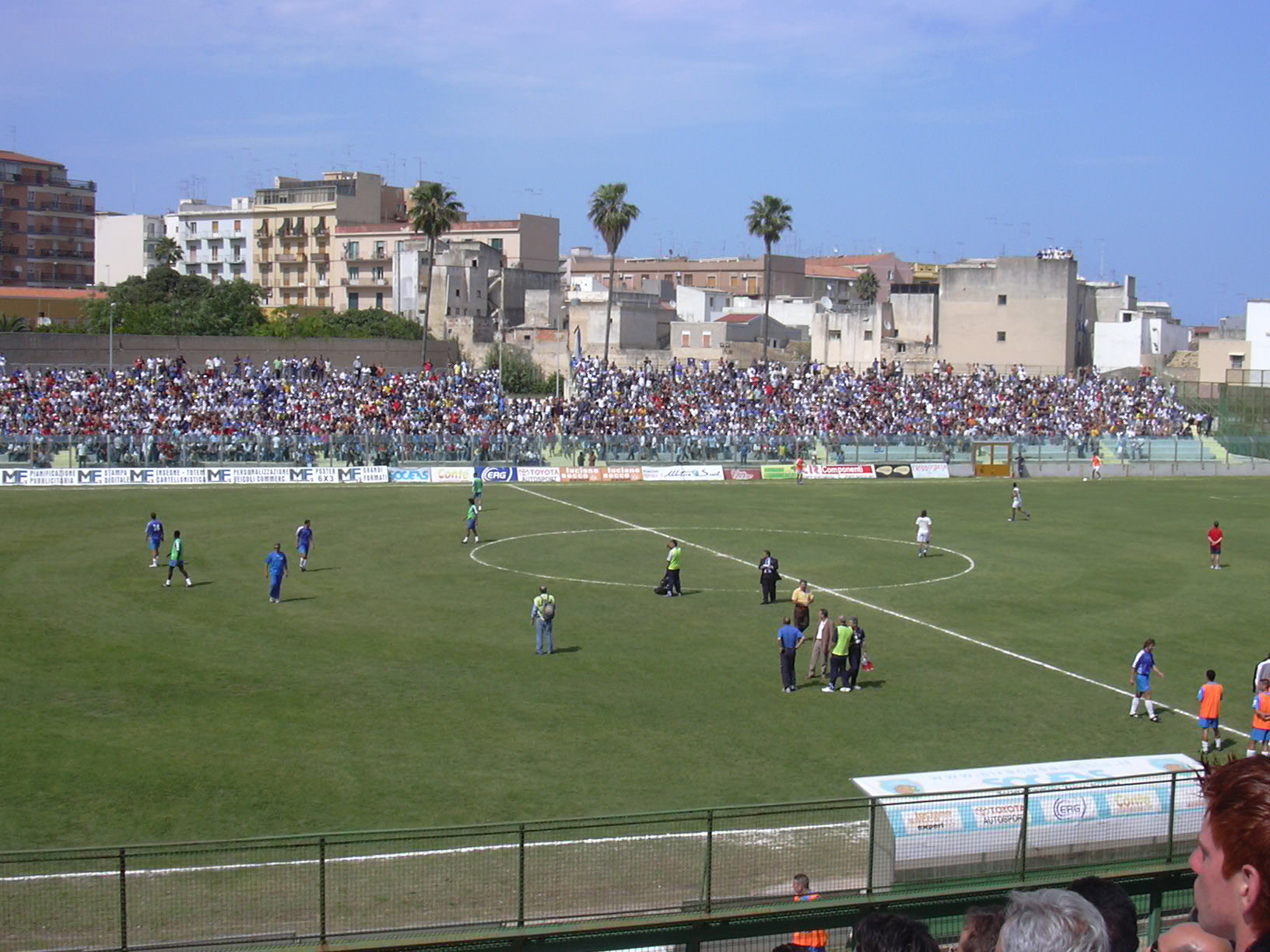
- The stadium on a matchday
- Interactive map of Stadio Nicola de Simone
- Full name: Stadio Comunale Nicola de Simone
- Location: Syracuse, Sicily
- Operator: City of Syracuse
- Capacity: 5,946
- Surface: Grass
- Field size: 105 x 65 m

Construction
- Built: 1930
- Opened: 1932
- Renovated: 2001, 2006
- Architect: Raffaele Leone

Tenants
- A.S. Siracusa (–1996); U.S. Siracusa (1996–2012); A.S.D. Città di Siracusa (2012–2013); Siracusa Calcio (2013–)

Stadio Nicola de Simone (commonly known as La Fossa dei Leoni) is a football stadium in Syracuse, Sicily. It is the home of Siracusa football team and has a capacity of 5,946 spectators.

The stadium was built in 1930 and was inaugurated in 1932. It was originally named the Stadio Vittorio Emanuele III, after the King of Italy, but it was re-named in honour of Nicola de Simone, a Siracusa player who died as a result of an accidental kick to the side of the head he had received during a game against Palma Campania on 13 May 1979.

The stadium is located in the Piazza Luigi Leone Cuella in central Siracusa's historic Santa Lucia district, near the Basilica of Santa Lucia and the Shrine of Our Lady of Tears.

== History ==
Stadio Nicola de Simone was originally built in 1930, during the years of fascism in Italy, as can be seen in symbols which are still visible in the architecture of the stadium's main entrance. The original name for many years was Stadio Vittorio Emanuele III, which is also visible on the stadium's main entrance. Its original capacity was around 8,000 spectators, although this was later brought down to its current capacity after numerous anti-violence laws were passed in Sicily. Despite this, after the club moved up to Serie C in 1988, it reached a maximum capacity of 12,000 spectators.

During the season of 1994–95, a metal security fence was built between the playing field and the spectators. This drastically reduced its capacity, as well as its visibility, especially in the sector of the South Curve, which was previously occupied by the home club's most devoted fans, who since then no longer occupy that sector. The South Curve was then reserved for the visiting team's fans and for this reason a security cage was built to space the steps and the curve itself (now called East Curve), further reducing overall capacity. As a result, the local fans were forced to find a place in the new West Curve, today known as “ Curva Anna “.

The stadium underwent minor renovations to its locker rooms and stands in 2001, which included the installation of a field watering system and of 700 blue seats (to match Siracusa's colors) in the grandstand. During this renovation, the stadium also added a west curve of seats, which restored the capacity back up to its current number.

In 2006, the stadium underwent further renovations, including the installation of better lights, the installation of a sound system, and the installation of new grass. Along with the renovation, a synthetic turf field was built nearby for practices and the youth squad, named after former Siracusa manager Paul Quattropani.

In 2007, the grandstand was named after a young Siracusa striker, Corrado Siringo, who died in a car accident earlier that year.

In December 2008, the canopy roof over the Central Tribune grandstand was demolished after the local Municipal authority had declared it unsafe for the public.

During 2009, further structural interventions were carried out, as requested by the Lega Pro inspector and which concerned the installation of plexiglass fences in all sectors of the stadium; the construction of the security room where CCTV cameras connected to the Police Headquarters are installed; the resizing of the pitch according to the parameters required by the professional championships; the extension of the West Curve; the expansion of the Guest Sector in the East Curve to 500 seats, and finally the creation of new emergency exits. After 2010, other decorative interventions were carried out to give a definitive image to the historic stadium, such as the reconstruction of a new canopy roof over the Central Tribune, rebuilt according to the parameters of the previous structure at the behest of the Superintendence which judged it to be of historical architectural importance.
