= 2023–24 SS Arezzo season =

SS Arezzo
2023–24 season
- Manager: Paolo Indiani
- Stadium: Stadio Città di Arezzo
- Serie C: Ongoing
- Coppa Italia Serie C: Pre-season

The 2023–24 season is SS Arezzo's 101st season in existence and first one back in the Serie C. They are also competing in the Coppa Italia Serie C.

== Players ==
=== First-team squad ===
As of 6 September 2023

Note: Flags indicate national team as defined under FIFA eligibility rules; some limited exceptions apply. Players may hold more than one non-FIFA nationality.

No.	Pos.	Nation	Player
1	GK	ITA	Luca Trombini
2	DF	ITA	Alberto Montini
4	DF	ITA	Giacomo Risaliti
5	MF	ITA	Sebastiano Bianchi
6	DF	ITA	Lorenzo Polvani
7	DF	ITA	Filippo Guccione
8	MF	ITA	Andrea Settembrini
9	FW	CZE	Libor Kozák
10	FW	ITA	Emiliano Pattarello
11	FW	ITA	Mattia Gaddini
12	GK	ITA	Jacopo Ermini
13	DF	ITA	Marco Chiosa
14	MF	ITA	Alessandro Renzi (on loan from Empoli)

No.	Pos.	Nation	Player
16	MF	GHA	Shaka Mawuli (on loan from Südtirol)
17	DF	ITA	Mirko Lazzarini
18	MF	ITA	Mattia Damiani
19	MF	ITA	Mattia Iori
20	DF	ITA	Samuele Zona
21	MF	ITA	Luca Castiglia
22	GK	ITA	Daniele Borra
23	DF	ITA	Andrea Poggesi
24	MF	ITA	Fabio Foglia
25	DF	ITA	Lorenzo Masetti
26	FW	ARG	Juan Facundo Crisafi
27	DF	ITA	Lorenzo Coccia (on loan from Modena)
28	FW	ITA	Niccolò Gucci

=== Out on loan ===
Note: Flags indicate national team as defined under FIFA eligibility rules; some limited exceptions apply. Players may hold more than one non-FIFA nationality.

No.	Pos.	Nation	Player
—	GK	ARG	Marco Fecit (at Reggina until 30 June 2024)
—	GK	ITA	Lorenzo Viti (at Carpi until 30 June 2024)
—	DF	ITA	Davide Di Pasquale (at Pescara until 30 June 2024)
—	DF	ITA	Omar Giubbolini (at San Donato until 30 June 2024)
—	DF	ITA	Rajan Maloku (at Aglianese until 30 June 2024)

No.	Pos.	Nation	Player
—	DF	ITA	Gianmarco Pericolini (at Flaminia until 30 June 2024)
—	MF	ITA	Giulio Dema (at Figline until 30 June 2024)
—	MF	ITA	Simone Fiore (at Romana until 30 June 2024)
—	MF	ITA	Matteo Nannini (at Romana until 30 June 2024)
—	FW	ALB	Alessandro Zhupa (at Figline until 30 June 2024)

== Pre-season and friendlies ==
Win Draw Loss Fixtures

13 September 2023 Friendly	Bologna	1–0	Arezzo	Casteldebole
	Zirkzee 57'	Report		Stadium: centro sportivo rossoblu Referee: Prontera

== Competitions ==
=== Overall record ===
Competition	First match	Last match	Starting round	Final position	Record							
Competition	First match	Last match	Starting round	Final position	Pld	W	D	L	GF	GA	GD	Win %
Serie C	September 2023	28 April 2024	Matchday 1		37	13	11	13	44	43	+1	35.14
Promotion play-offs	4 May 2024		First round		0	0	0	0	0	0	+0	—
Coppa Italia Serie C	3 October 2023		First round	First round	1	0	0	1	3	4	−1	0.00
Total					38	13	11	14	47	47	+0	34.21

Last updated: 21 April 2024
Source: Soccerway

=== Serie C ===
==== League table ====
Pos	Team	Pld	W	D	L	GF	GA	GD	Pts	Qualification
6	Pescara	38	16	7	15	60	55	+5	55	Group play-offs 1st round
7	Juventus Next Gen	38	15	9	14	50	44	+6	54	Group play-offs 1st round
8	Arezzo	38	14	11	13	46	44	+2	53	Group play-offs 1st round
9	Pontedera	38	14	10	14	53	54	−1	52	Group play-offs 1st round
10	Rimini	38	14	8	16	52	54	−2	50	Group play-offs 1st round

Updated to match(es) played on 28 April 2024. Source: Lega Pro, Soccerway (in English)
Rules for classification: 1) Points; 2) Head-to-head points; 3) Head-to-head goal difference; 4) Goal difference; 5) Goals scored; 6) Lower goals against; 7) Wins; 8) Lower losses; 9) Away wins; 10) Lower home losses.
(Note: Head-to-head record is used only after all the matches between the teams in question have been played)

==== Results summary ====
Overall								Home						Away					
Pld	W	D	L	GF	GA	GD	Pts	W	D	L	GF	GA	GD	W	D	L	GF	GA	GD
19	6	5	8	23	28	−5	23	3	3	3	11	11	0	3	2	5	12	17	−5

Last updated: 23 December 2023.
Source: Worldfootball

==== Results by round ====
Round	1	2	3	4	5	6	7	8	9	10	11	12	13	14	15	16	17	18	19	20
Ground	A	H	A	H	A	H	H	A	H	A	H	A	H	A	A	H	A	H	A	H
Result	W	L	L	D	W	D	L	L	W	L	W	D	L	W	L	D	L	W	D	
Position	4	10	14	12	10	8	10	14	11	15	11	12	13	12	13	13	13	10		

Updated to match(es) played on 23 December 2023. Source: Worldfootball
A = Away; H = Home; W = Win; D = Draw; L = Loss

==== Matches ====
The league fixtures were unveiled on 7 August 2023.

18 December 2023 18	Arezzo	2–0	Perugia	Arezzo
CET (UTC+1)				Stadium: Stadio Città di Arezzo

23 December 2023 19	Sestri Levante	0–0	Arezzo	Vercelli
CET (UTC+1)				Stadium: Stadio Silvio Piola

6 January 2024 20	Arezzo	v	Rimini	Arezzo
16:15 CET (UTC+1)				Stadium: Stadio Città di Arezzo
