= Settembrini =

Settembrini is a surname. Notable people with the surname include:

- Andrea Settembrini (born 1991), Italian footballer
- Luigi Settembrini (1813–1877), Italian man of letters and politician
- Lodovico Settembrini, a fictional character in Thomas Mann's novel The Magic Mountain
