= Playmaker =

Playing role in association football

In association football, a playmaker is a footballer who controls the flow of the team's play, and is often involved in offensive and defensive passing moves which lead to goals, through their vision, technique, ball control, creativity and passing ability. They are sometimes called the "number 10" of the team, as they often wear the number 10 jersey.

In English football, the term overlaps somewhat with an attacking midfielder, although playmakers are not necessarily constrained to a single position. Several playmakers can also operate on the wings or as a creative, supporting striker; some can also function in a more central midfield role, alternating between playing in more offensive roles and participating in the build-up plays in the midfield. Other players still function as deep-lying playmakers, in a free role, behind the midfield line. Playmakers are not usually known for their defensive capabilities, which is why they are often supported by a defensive midfielder. As many midfielders and forwards have the aforementioned creative and technical attributes, they tend to be the playmakers of a team.

== Advanced playmakers ==
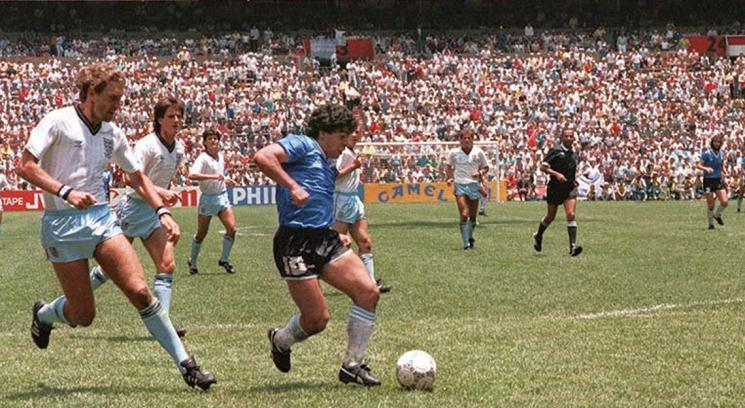
Attacking midfielder Diego Maradona (shirt number 10) right before scoring the "Goal of the Century" for Argentina against England in the quarter-finals of the 1986 World Cup in Mexico

The most complete and versatile playmakers are often known as advanced playmakers, or free-role playmakers, as they can operate both in central, attacking midfield positions, and in wider positions on the wings. The attacking playmakers are sometimes called the "number 10" of the team, as they often wear the number 10 jersey. The attacking midfield playmaker will sit in a free role between the midfield and the forwards, either in the centre of the pitch or on either flank. These offensive playmakers will often make incisive passes to the wingers or forwards, seeing them through on goal or to deliver killer crosses, as well as scoring goals themselves. They are also usually quick, agile, and highly technical players with good vision, shooting, passing, crossing and dribbling ability; they are known for scoring goals as well as providing assists, through-balls, and initiating attacking plays. In Italian football, as creative, technical, advanced playmakers are known not to be reserved to a single position, they are often described as the "fantasista" or "trequartista". In Brazil, the offensive playmaker is known as the "meia atacante", whereas in Argentina, it is known as the "enganche". In the English language, this position is sometimes colloquially referred to as playing "in the hole", as these playmakers often link the midfield and attack by essentially operating in the gap between the opposition's midfield and defence. Diego Maradona, Zico, Michel Platini, Marta, Pelé, Zinedine Zidane, Kaká, Lionel Messi, Roberto Baggio, Rui Costa, Michael Laudrup, Gheorghe Hagi, Jay-Jay Okocha, Shunsuke Nakamura, Juan Román Riquelme and Francesco Totti are some examples of footballers who have been fielded as advanced midfield playmakers throughout their career.

== Deep-lying playmakers ==
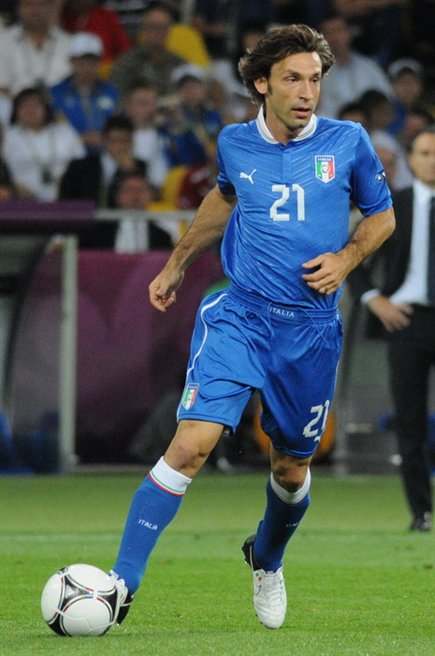
Deep-lying playmaker Andrea Pirlo playing for Italy against England in the quarter-finals of Euro 2012

Deep-lying playmakers, who often wear jersey numbers 8, 6 or 5 (particularly in South American football), operate from a deep position, in or even behind the main midfield line in a seemingly central or defensive midfield role, where they can use space and time on the ball to dictate the tempo of their team's play and orchestrate the moves of the whole team, not just attacks on goal. Deep-lying playmakers are often known for their vision, technique and passing. Many are also known for their ability to switch the play or provide long passes that pick out players making attacking runs, as well as their striking ability from distance. Although several deep-lying playmakers are not known for their tackling, work-rate, or defensive skills, it has become more common for a box-to-box midfielder with good passing, technique, vision and ball-winning ability, such as Yaya Touré, to play in this role, since it is in a similar position to that of a defensive midfielder, and the role allows them to break down plays and subsequently create scoring opportunities themselves after winning back possession. In a 2013 article for The Guardian, writer Jonathan Wilson described this unique creative holding midfield role as that of a "creator," citing Xabi Alonso as a typical example of player who operated in this position, noting that: "Xabi Alonso, although capable of making tackles, focused on keeping the ball moving, occasionally raking long passes out to the flanks to change the angle of attack like an old-style regista."

In Italy, the deep-lying playmaker is known as a "regista", whereas in Brazil, it is known as a "meia-armador". In Italy, the role of the regista developed from the centre half-back or centromediano metodista position in Vittorio Pozzo's metodo system (a precursor of the central or holding midfield position in the 2–3–2–3 formation), as the metodista's responsibilities were not entirely defensive but also creative; as such, the metodista was not solely tasked with breaking down possession, but also with starting attacking plays after winning back the ball. Fernando Redondo, Xavi, Andrea Pirlo, Toni Kroos, Luka Modrić, Michael Carrick, Paul Scholes, Miralem Pjanić, Jorginho, Marcos Senna, Sunday Oliseh, and Pep Guardiola are some more examples of players who operated as deep-lying playmakers throughout their careers.

== Other variants ==
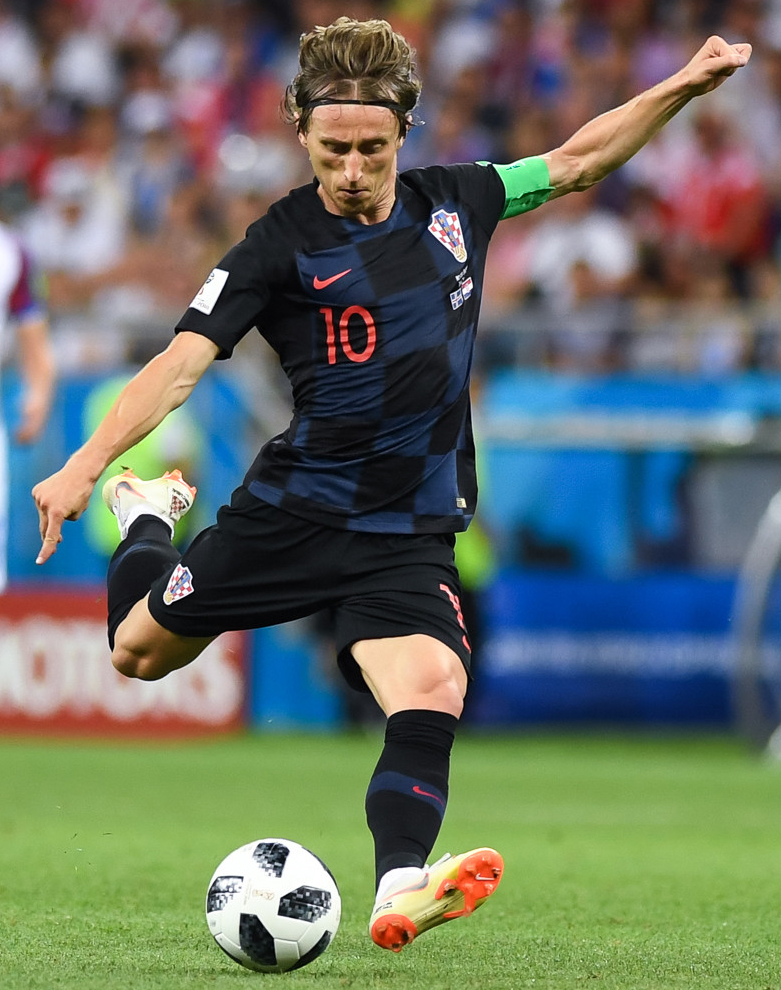
Luka Modrić is known for his ability to blend advanced playmaking with box-to-box play and deep-lying positioning.

Playmakers are not necessarily constrained to a single position; many attacking playmakers in modern football play a combination of these different attacking roles, often operating in a free position. Some playmakers can also function in a more central midfield role, or can even be given the freedom to alternate between playing in more offensive creative roles and participating in the build-up plays and controlling the team's tempo in a deeper midfield position, such as Zinedine Zidane, Nécib, or Juan Román Riquelme. Creativity, skill, vision, technique, tactical awareness and good passing ability are the true requirements of a good playmaker. With the increasing physical and athletic demands of modern football, it has also become increasingly common for midfield playmakers, in particular those who are known for their dynamism, ability to read the game, and work-rate off the ball, to play in deeper roles and be given more defensive responsibilities, in addition to their creative duties: midfielders such as Bastian Schweinsteiger, Toni Kroos, and Paul Pogba often play in the centre of the pitch and occupy multiple roles, functioning both as box-to-box midfielders and creators, usually dropping back and helping to press opponents and win back possession, and then subsequently either carrying the ball forward, or dictating play and starting an attack with their vision, technique, and passing.

According to Jonathan Wilson, Luka Modrić is another example of a midfielder who occupies multiple roles on the pitch; although he initially started out as an attacking midfielder at Dinamo Zagreb, he was moved into a deeper central midfield playmaking role during his time with Tottenham, which enabled him to conduct the attack and create chances for teammates. He continued to play in a deeper midfield role in Real Madrid's 4–2–3–1 system. However, Wilson has noted that, although Modrić seemingly plays as a holding midfielder, he is "neither entirely destructive or creative", but a "carrier" who is "capable of making late runs or carrying the ball at his feet", but in his case "with a hint of regista".

=== Winger ===
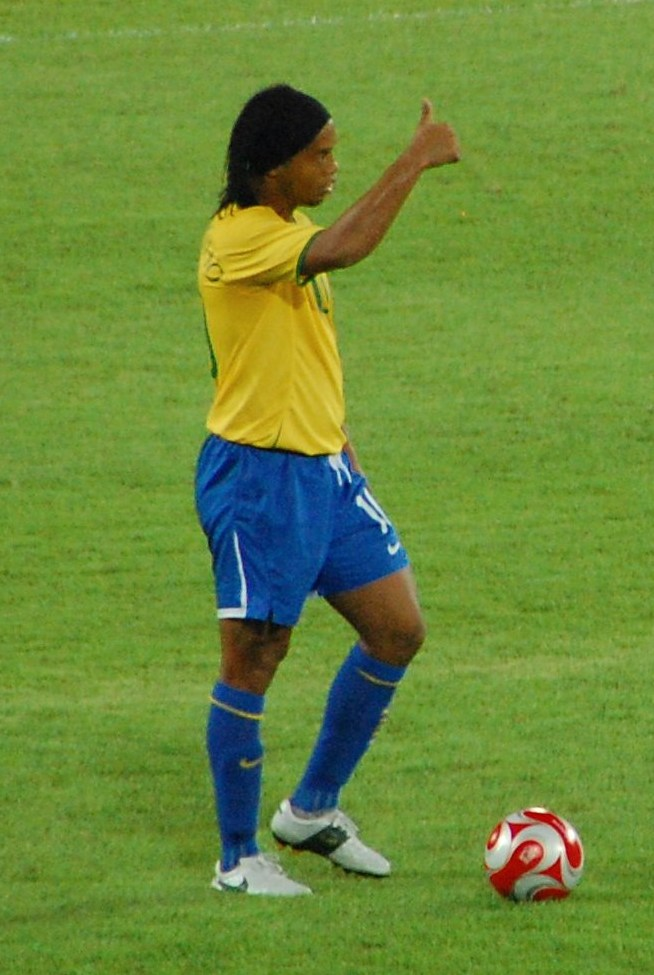
Ronaldinho – pictured with Brazil at the 2008 Summer Olympics – occasionally played as an inverted winger throughout his career.

Advanced playmakers can also operate on the wings, in more of a wide offensive position, as a half-winger, inverted winger, or also as an outside forward, in a 4–3–3 or a 4–2–3–1 formation. This position has become more common for offensive playmakers to carry out in recent years, as formations that employ a purely attacking playmaker, such as the 4–3–1–2/4–1–2–1–2, can often cause teams defensive problems when possession is lost, as attacking midfielders are not usually renowned for their defensive contribution, although modern playmakers are often more tactically responsible in this respect than classical playmakers. This position also allows players to take on defenders in one on one situations along the flank, cut inside to the centre of the pitch with the ball, and either shoot on goal with their stronger foot, or provide in-swinging lobbed passes or crosses. Lionel Messi, for example, who is naturally left-footed, was initially deployed in this position on the right under his former Barcelona manager Frank Rijkaard, alongside the right-footed Ronaldinho on the left side of the pitch. Some playmakers, such as David Beckham, even operate as a wide midfielder in a 4–4–2, using their vision to find teammates making runs, to whom they can then deliver long passes and curling crosses, although this position of a "pure winger" has become less common in modern formations.

=== Nine and a half ===
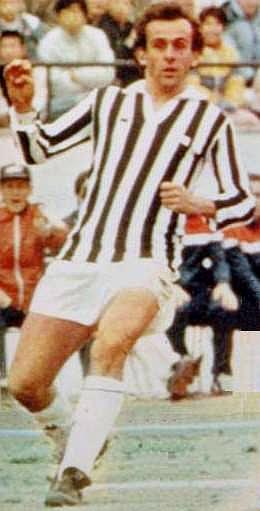
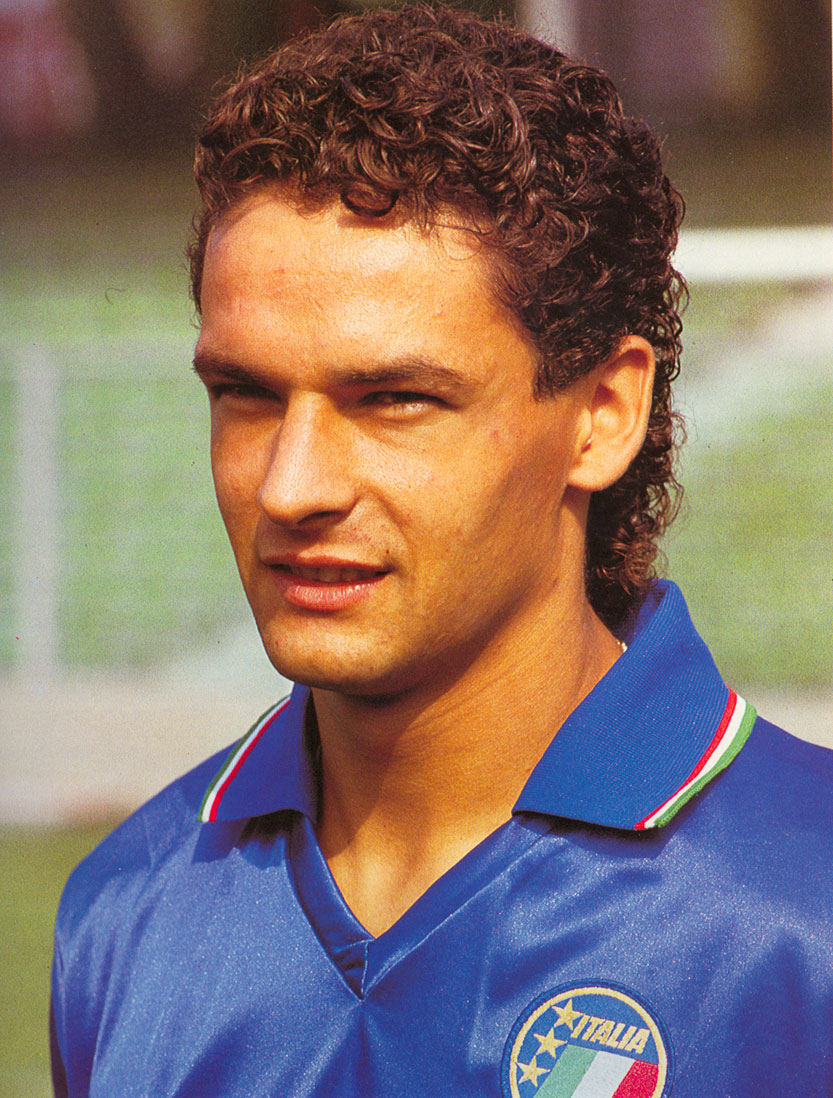
Michel Platini (left), who played as an advanced playmaker himself, later coined the term "nine and a half" to describe the playing style of his successor in Juventus colours, Roberto Baggio (right).

There are also other similar variants upon the advanced playmaking role. Other advanced playmakers seemingly operate as a free, creative second striker, or inside-forward, often playing on the wing, alongside a main striker, or even down the centre of the pitch, and then falling back into a deeper role to link up the midfield and the attack. Attacking midfielder/playmaker Michel Platini would describe this more advanced creative role (exemplified by Roberto Baggio) as a nine and a half ("nove e mezzo", in Italian), as it was halfway between the role of a goalscoring forward (shirt number 9) and a playmaking attacking midfielder (shirt number 10).

This free position allowed these mobile, creative, and technical players, who were also often gifted with an eye for goal as well as good vision, acceleration, and ball skills, the freedom to burst forward suddenly and make dribbling runs, drop deep to lose their markers and pick up the ball, link-up with teammates, and score many goals themselves as well as assisting them. Unlike a pure number ten playmaker, however, the nine and a half/supporting forward does not usually participate in the build-up play as much as an attacking midfielder would. Their role is primarily that of an assist-provider, who can play one-twos as well as hold up and lay-off the ball for more offensive teammates. As the supporting forward initially originated from free-role attacking midfielders adapting to a more advanced position in the tactically rigorous 4–4–2 formations of the 1990s, in which they were often paired up with a more physically gifted out-and-out striker, their defensive contribution is also usually higher than that of a pure number ten playmaker.

In Italy, this role is known as a "rifinitore" or "seconda punta", whereas in Brazil, it is known as a "segundo atacante" or "ponta-de-lança".

=== False nine ===
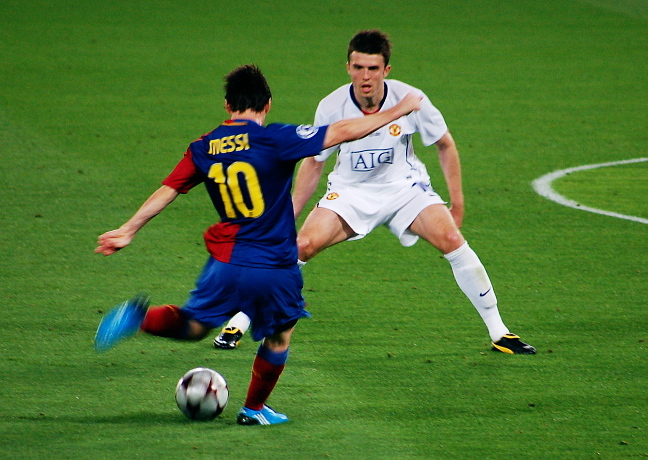
Lionel Messi (left, 10) has been a leading exponent of the false 9 position.

A variation upon the deep-lying forward, more commonly known as a "false 9" also shares some similarities with the attacking midfielder role, although the false-9 player appears to be playing as a centre forward rather than as an attacking midfielder. A false-9 is often a quick, nimble, diminutive, creative, and technical player, with good vision, movement, positioning, and passing ability, as well as a penchant for scoring goals. The false-9, seemingly playing as a lone striker, will drop deep into the midfield number 10 role, drawing defenders with them, and creating space for other teammates to make attacking runs. This allows the false-9 space to dribble with the ball and score, or to provide other players running into the space they created with assists. Examples of false-9s are Lionel Messi under Pep Guardiola, Tito Vilanova and Gerardo Martino at Barcelona, Cesc Fàbregas with Spain under Vicente del Bosque, Francesco Totti at Roma under Luciano Spalletti and Rudi Garcia, and Roberto Firmino under Jurgen Klopp. This position is most common in a 4–6–0 formation disguised as a 4–3–3 or 4–2–3–1 formation. In Italian football jargon, this role is known as the "centravanti di manovra" (which literally translates to "manoeuvring centre-forward").

=== False ten ===
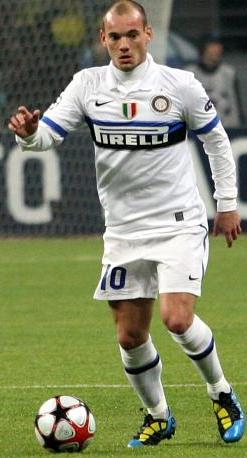
Wesley Sneijder – pictured playing for Inter Milan in 2010 – has been deployed as a false 10 on occasion.

In addition to their creative responsibilities while in possession, in the modern game, advanced playmakers are also given more duties off the ball than in the past, and are also required to have a higher defensive work-rate; as such, the role of the number 10 has changed in recent years, and formations that utilise a traditional advanced playmaker have become less common. In formations that still do employ an attacking midfielder, however, the number 10 role has instead been described as the "false 10" role (or sometimes it is even described as that of a "central winger"). The false-10 also shares similar attributes to a false-9, and is often used in a 4–2–3–1 formation. A false-10 is also usually a quick, offensive, technical and creative player, who is apparently playing in deeper role than a false-9 however, usually starting in the attacking midfielder position behind the striker, or occasionally as a winger, as the role is often interpreted by players who naturally play in these positions. As such, the false-10 is often a more dynamic rather than static player, who is tasked with pulling opponents out of position with their movement; indeed, the false-10 will often surprise defenders by moving out of position, drifting out wide, onto the wing, creating space for other players, in particular the full-backs and midfielders, to make attacking runs, either by overloading the flanks, or by drawing opponents out of position. The false 10 will then advance along the flank and provide deliveries into the box for teammates, or pass the ball to a free teammate who is exploiting the newly created space, either on the wing or in the centre. Defensively, they will often participate in their team's pressing game in order to help win back possession; they may also be tasked with finding gaps in the opposing defence and making late runs into the penalty box themselves.

The false-10 can also function alongside a false-9 on occasion, in a 4–3–3 (4–6–0) formation, or in a 4–2–3–1 formation. When other forwards or false-9s draw defenders away from the false-10s, creating space in the middle of the pitch, the false-10 will then also surprise defenders by moving out of position once again, often undertaking offensive dribbling runs forward, or running on to passes from false-9s, leading to goals and assists. This role was effectively demonstrated by Wesley Sneijder and Mesut Özil during the 2010 FIFA World Cup.

=== False attacking midfielder ===
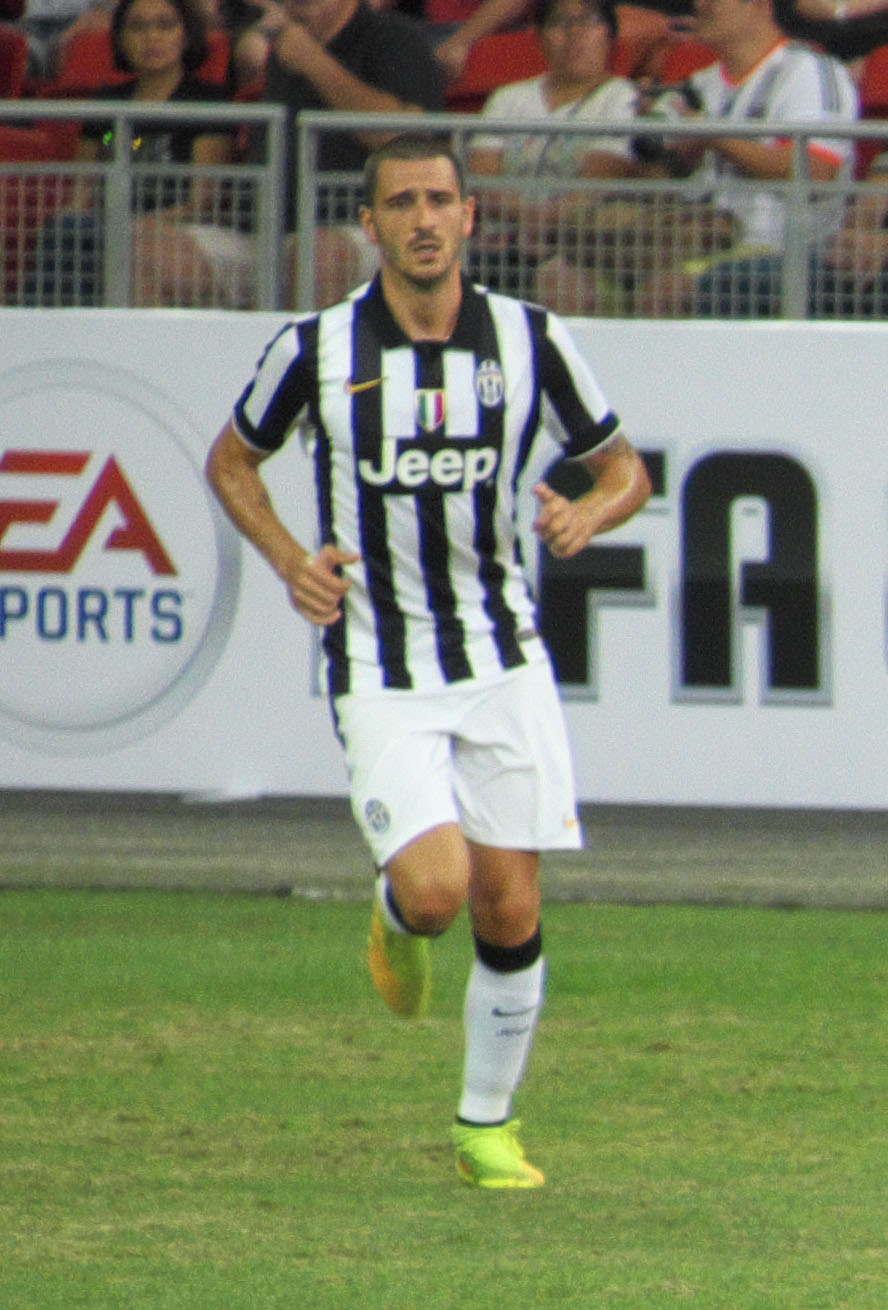
Leonardo Bonucci has often functioned as a ball-playing centre-back throughout his career.

The false-10 (or false attacking midfielder) description has also been used in a slightly different manner in Italian football. The false attacking-midfielder is therefore usually a technical, mobile, and creative player with good vision, positioning, ball control and long passing ability, as well as being a player with respectable defensive attributes, and good long distance shooting ability. The false-10 performs in a similar manner to the false-9, although seemingly playing in the number 10 role, but still drawing opposition players back into the midfield. The false-10 will eventually sit in a central midfield role and function as a deep-lying playmaker, creating space for other players to make attacking runs and receive long passes from the midfield playmakers. In addition to their creative duties, the false attacking midfielder is also often tasked with dropping deep into midfield to assist their team defensively and help retrieved possession.

=== False winger ===
The "false winger" or "seven–and–a–half" is instead a label which has been used to describe a creative type of player who normally plays centrally, but who instead is deployed out wide on paper; during the course of a match, however, they will move inside and operate in the centre of the pitch, in order to drag defenders out of position, congest the midfield and give their team a numerical advantage in this area, so that they can dictate play with their passing, dominate possession in the middle of the pitch, and create chances for their attacking teammates; this position also leaves space for full-backs to make overlapping attacking runs up the flank. Samir Nasri, who has been deployed in this role, once described it as that of a "non-axial playmaker".

=== Playmaking in other positions ===
==== Sweeper ====
It is also possible for a sweeper (or "libero", in Italian) to operate as a team's secondary playmaker; this position is often associated with former central defenders, such as Franz Beckenbauer, Franco Baresi, Ronald Koeman, Fernando Hierro, Aldair and Gaetano Scirea, who possessed good ball skills, vision, and long passing ability. Although this position has become largely obsolete in modern football formations, due to the use of zonal marking, players such as Daniele De Rossi, Jérôme Boateng, Mats Hummels, Leonardo Bonucci, and David Luiz have played a similar role as a ball-playing centre-back in a three-man back-line. Their technique and ball-playing ability allow them to advance into midfield and function as a secondary playmaker for the team, in order to create goal-scoring chances when their team's primary deep-lying midfield playmaker is being heavily marked by the opposition.

==== Sweeper-keeper ====
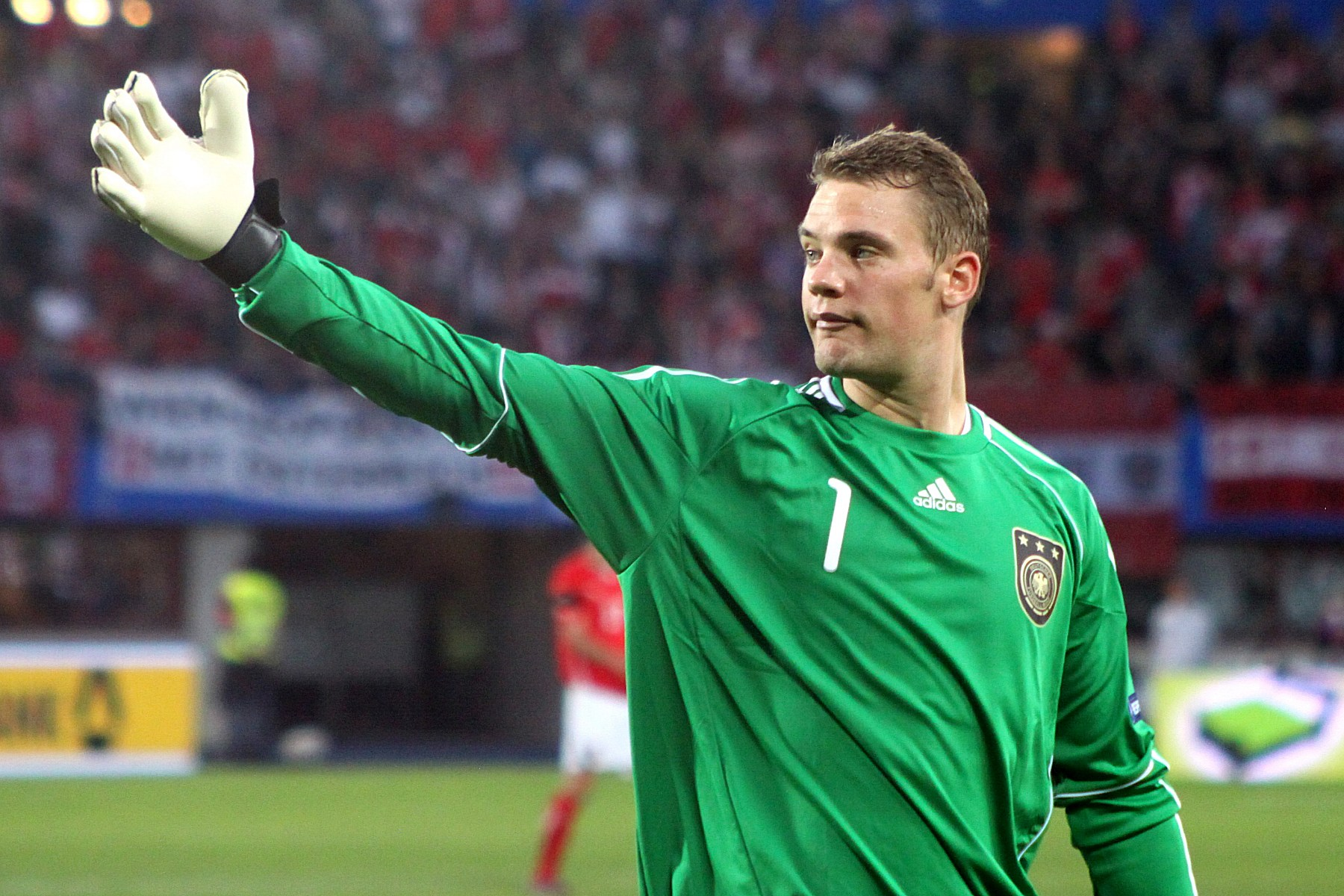
German goalkeeper Manuel Neuer is known for his distribution.

To some limited extent, it is also possible for goalkeepers with good ball skills, vision, passing, long-throwing, and kicking ability to launch counter-attacks and create scoring opportunities; goalkeepers such as René Higuita, Fabien Barthez, Edwin van der Sar and most recently Manuel Neuer, Claudio Bravo, Marc-André ter Stegen, Alisson Becker and Ederson Moraes for example, among others, are known for their adeptness with the ball at their feet, and their long passing accuracy from goal kicks; their playing style has led several pundits to dub them as "sweeper-keepers" or playmakers.

== Qualities of a good playmaker ==
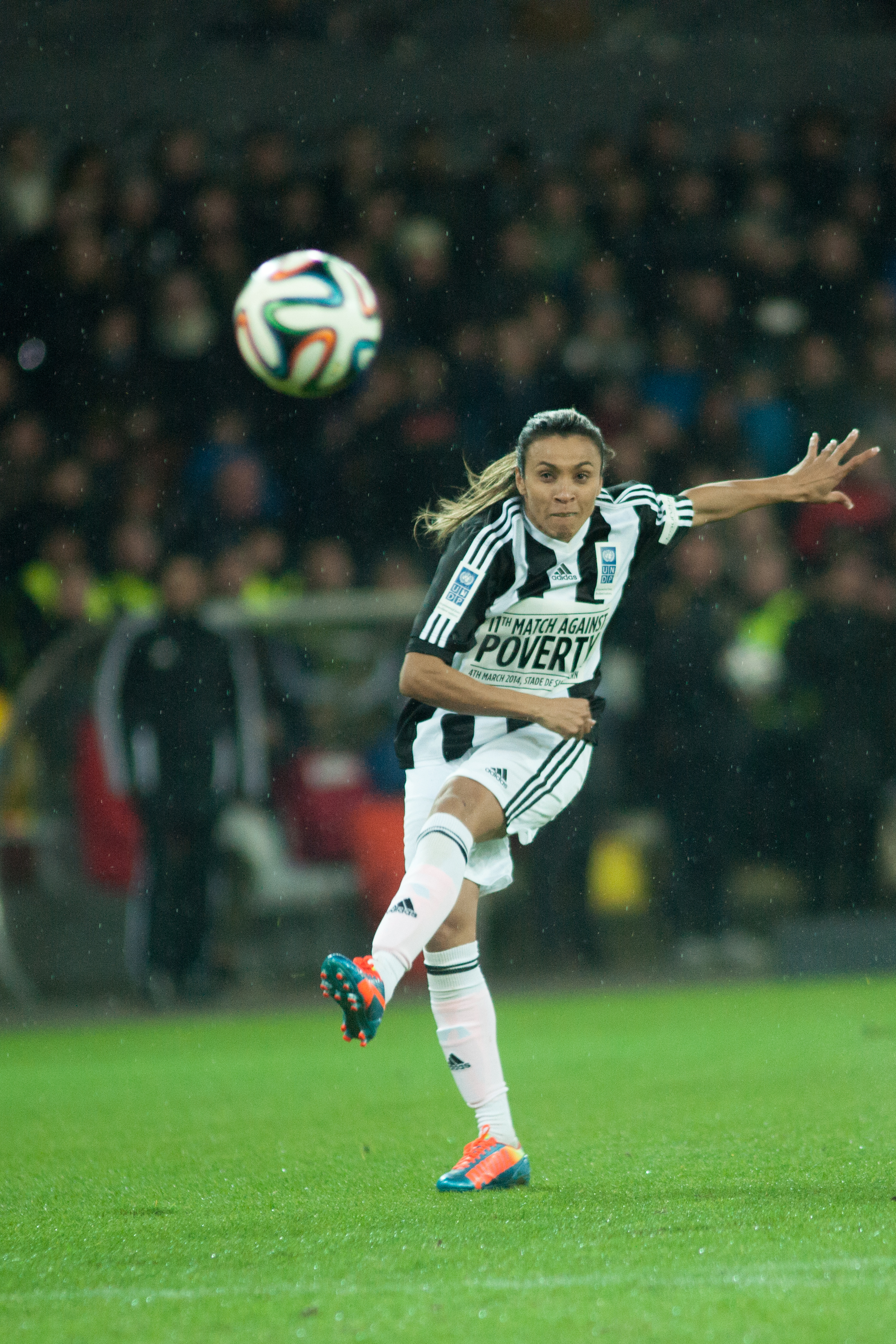
Brazilian playmaker Marta is known for her technical skills in addition to her ability to score goals and create chances for teammates.

Perhaps the most important quality of a playmaker is the vision and ability to read the game, and to get into good positions making for effective reception and distribution of the ball. Intuition and creativity are other key elements of a playmaker's game, as they need to know where different players are at different times, without taking too long to dwell on the ball. A good playmaker possesses good ball control, balance, technical ability, and dribbling skills, and will often hold possession, allowing other team members to make attacking runs. The ostensible role of the playmaker is to then provide or facilitate the final pass which leads to a goal. In football terminology, this is often known as a killer ball or the final ball, and is officially recorded as an assist.

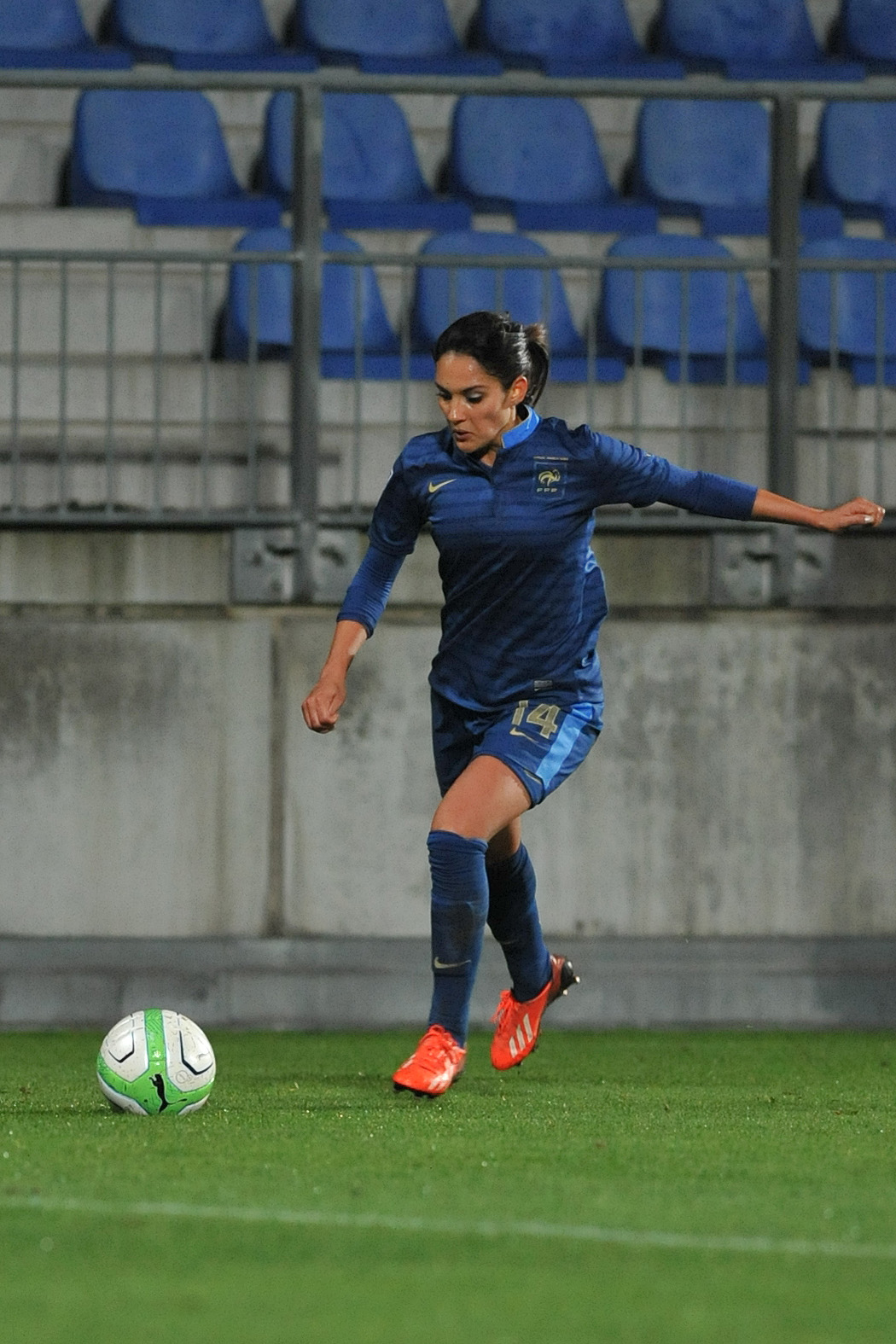
Nécib – pictured playing for France in a match against Austria in 2013 – has drawn praise in the media for her elegance on the ball, as well as her vision and passing ability.

Advanced playmakers are often known for their ability to score goals as well as their technical skills, passing, and chance creation ability. They are often – but not always – quick, agile, and mobile players, with good tactical intelligence; their movement off the ball is just as important as their movement on the ball, as they must create space for further attacking plays. Many playmakers are also free-kick, penalty, and dead-ball specialists, who are also capable of curling the ball into the box from set pieces, providing further deliveries for teammates, although this is not necessarily a trait that is required to be a playmaker.

== Tactics ==
=== English football ===
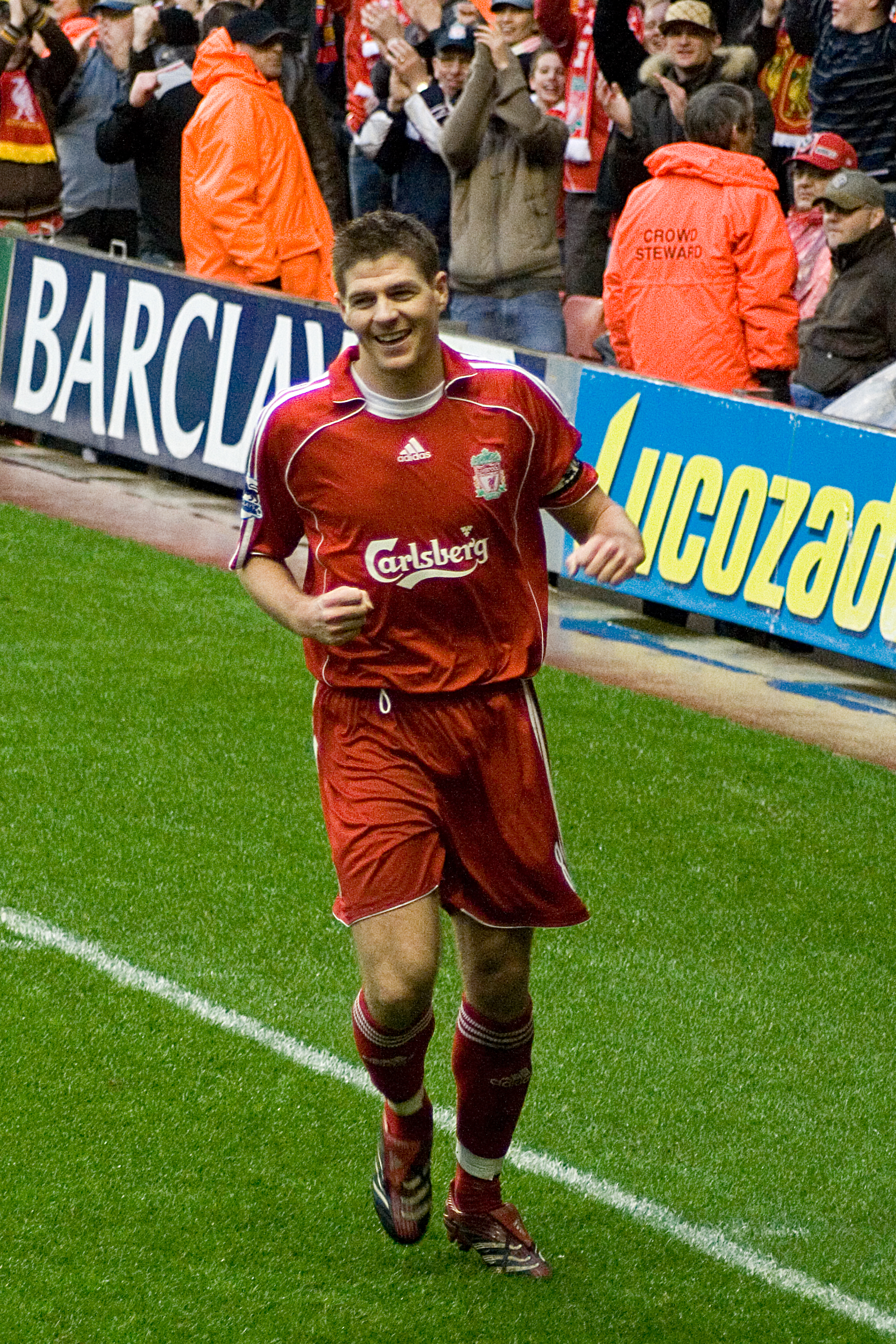
English midfielder Steven Gerrard – pictured playing for Liverpool during the 2006–07 season – played in a number of midfield roles throughout his career, including that of a playmaker.

Classical number 10 and deep-lying playmakers are not often renowned for their tackling or defensive capabilities, hence English commentators have often seen them as a luxury in a football team, but they retain their places due to their ability to change games. Because of this, it became common in the past for box-to-box midfielders with good vision, tackling, tactical intelligence, passing and technical ability to play in the playmaker role in England, as shown by various coaches employing players such as Paul Scholes, Steven Gerrard, Frank Lampard, Yaya Touré and Xabi Alonso in this position. In a 4–4–2 formation, a playmaker will usually play alongside a defensive midfield player to ensure that the team is not vulnerable to attack. With different formations, however, a team may play with multiple playmakers. Most English teams usually use only one playmaker to minimize defensive frailties and also because using more than one may inhibit each playmaker's playing style. The downside to this approach is that a team lacks the necessary creativity when faced with a defensive opponent. Some contemporary teams using formations such as 4–2–3–1, 4–4–1–1, 4–5–1, and 4–1–2–1–2/4–3–1–2, have multiple playmakers. Some examples of the few notable English players in this position are Paul Gascoigne and Glenn Hoddle, while most playmakers have tended to be foreigners in the Premier League.

=== Italian football ===
Carlo Mazzone and Carlo Ancelotti were known for having been able to adopt their formations to allow them to implement various playmakers into their starting formation. At Brescia, Mazzone moved Andrea Pirlo, originally an attacking midfielder, into the deep-lying role behind the midfield, whilst Roberto Baggio played the attacking midfielder role. For Milan, Ancelotti made a similar move, also employing Pirlo as a deep-lying playmaker, allowing Rivaldo or Rui Costa, and later Kaká, to play as an attacking midfielder, whilst Clarence Seedorf and either Gennaro Gattuso or Massimo Ambrosini protected them defensively in Ancelotti's 4–4–2 midfield diamond formation. Due to the strength of Milan's midfield during his tenure with the club, Ancelotti was able to win several domestic and international titles. Marcello Lippi also utilised two playmakers during Italy's victorious 2006 FIFA World Cup campaign, fielding Francesco Totti in the advanced creative role behind the forwards, and Pirlo in the deep-lying playmaking role. The two playmakers were supported defensively by box-to-box midfielders, such as Daniele De Rossi, Gennaro Gattuso and Simone Perrotta; both Pirlo and Totti finished as two of the joint top-assist providers of the tournament.

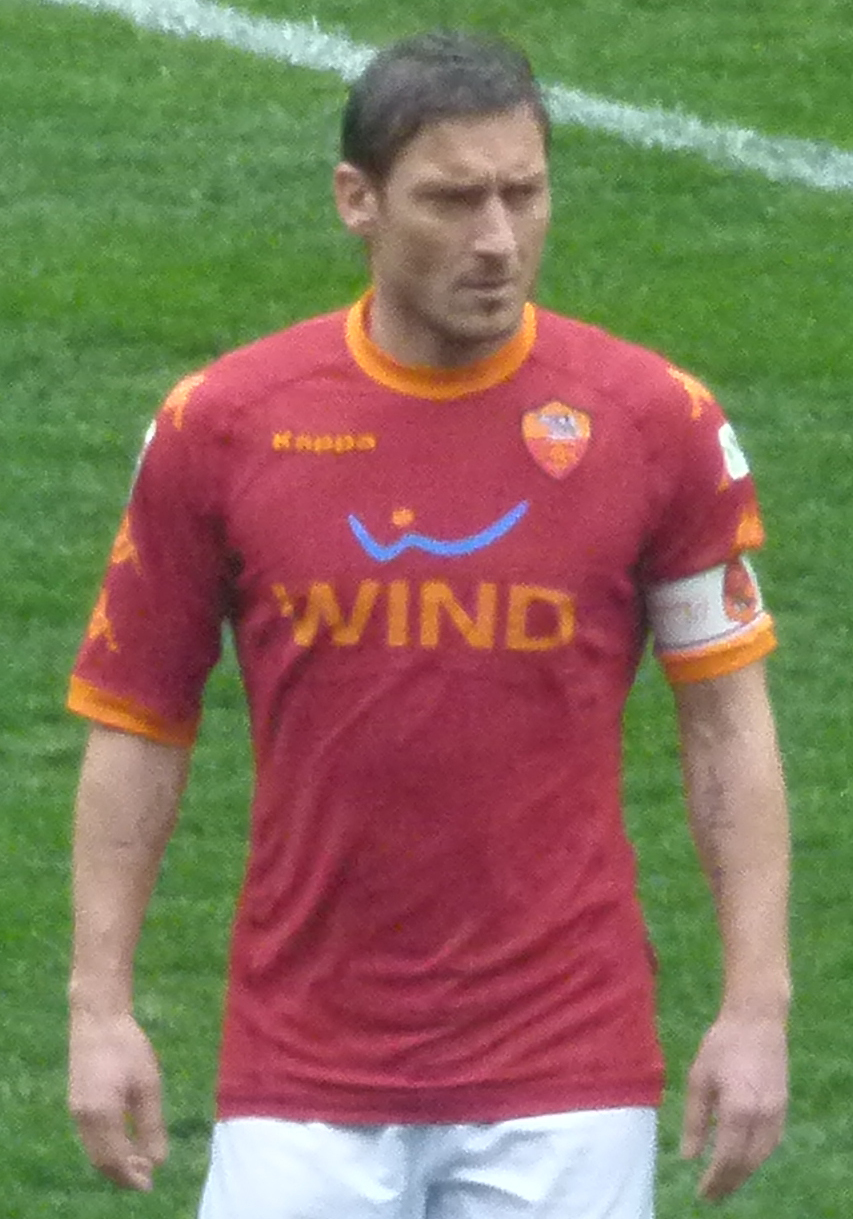
Italian attacking midfield playmaker Francesco Totti spent his entire career with Roma, also serving as the team's captain.

Former Italy manager Ferruccio Valcareggi, however, devised a different strategy altogether, which allowed him to use two playmakers during his run to the 1970 World Cup final, where Italy was ultimately heavily defeated by Brazil. Due to his focus on defensive stability, as well as the presence of two pure, prolific goalscoring strikers, Gigi Riva and Roberto Boninsegna, Valcareggi felt that it would not be possible to field Italy's two most revered advanced playmakers at the time, Gianni Rivera, and Sandro Mazzola, alongside each other. He believed the two creative players to be incompatible with each other, due to the rivalry between their respective clubs, and as he felt that deploying both players alongside the forwards would offset the balance within the starting line-up, in particular as Rivera, unlike Mazzola, was not renowned for his athleticism or defensive work-rate. He therefore conceived the infamous "staffetta" (relay) game-plan, which essentially consisted of Mazzola playing the first half of each match, whilst Rivera would play the second half; during Valcareggi's eight-year tenure with Italy, the national side only lost six matches. Despite Italy's victory at UEFA Euro 1968 and their second-place finish at the 1970 World Cup, the tactic was widely criticised by the media, in particular due to Italy's poor performance during the group-stage and in the final, despite demonstrating their ability to successfully apply a more offensive, exciting style of play with Rivera in the semi-final against West Germany. During the 1998 World Cup, Italy manager Cesare Maldini underwent similar widespread media criticism for employing a strategy reminiscent of the 1970 "staffetta" between Roberto Baggio and Alessandro Del Piero, who alternated occupying the creative second striker role, alongside an out-and-out striker or centre-forward (usually Christian Vieri or occasionally Filippo Inzaghi) in a 4–4–2 formation; manager Giovanni Trapattoni was also initially criticised for not fielding playmakers Francesco Totti and Del Piero alongside each other during the 2002 World Cup.

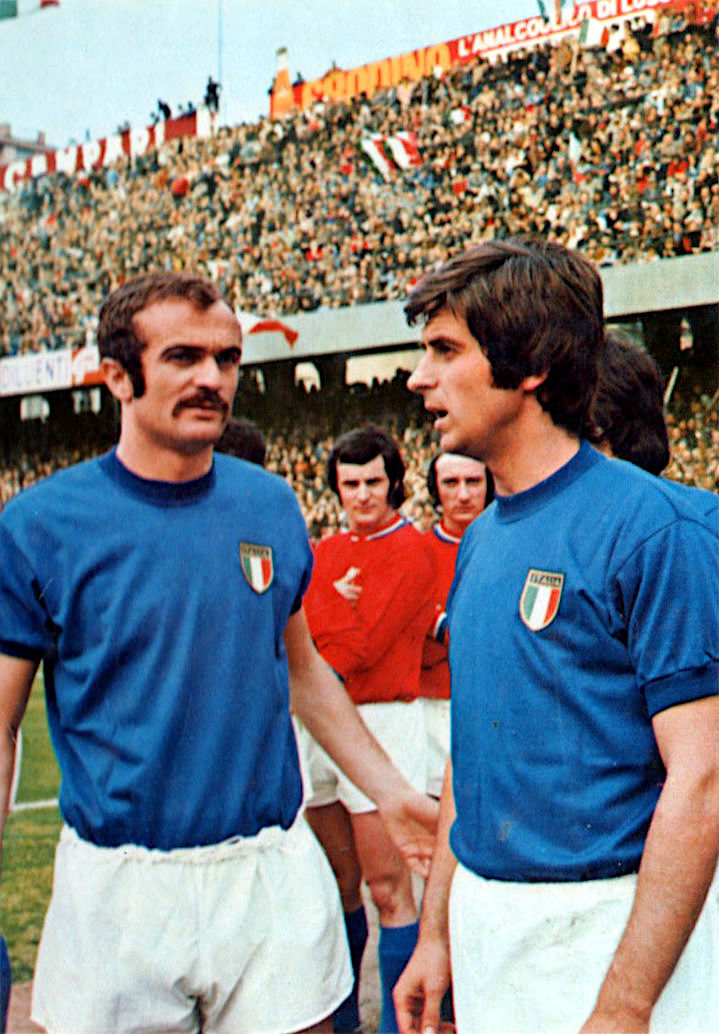
Sandro Mazzola (left) playing for Italy alongside Gianni Rivera (right); the two playmakers would be involved in manager Ferruccio Valcareggi's infamous staffetta policy at the 1970 World Cup.

During his run to the Euro 2012 final and the 2013 FIFA Confederations Cup semi-finals, the former Italy coach Cesare Prandelli also used several playmakers in his squad; he often deployed either Riccardo Montolivo, Alberto Aquilani, Daniele De Rossi, Antonio Nocerino or Thiago Motta in the false 10 playmaking role, as well as in other midfield positions, in his 4–3–1–2 formation; this formation was devoid of an authentic attacking midfielder, and was centred on the midfielders constantly switching positions. Prandelli's midfield was focussed on the creative playmaking of Andrea Pirlo and Montolivo in their deep-lying playmaker and false attacking midfield roles, with Pirlo seemingly being deployed as a defensive midfielder in front of the defense, in order to be left with more time on the ball, in an "inverted" midfield diamond (4–1–3–2). Pirlo was supported defensively by dynamic box-to-box midfielders, such as Claudio Marchisio and De Rossi, due to his lack of pace or notable defensive ability. The space created by the movement of Montolivo as the false 10 allowed quicker, more offensive minded midfielders, such as Marchisio, to make attacking runs in order to receive Pirlo and Montolivo's long passes from the midfield, whilst the second striker Antonio Cassano would drop out wide onto the wing or into the attacking midfielder position to link up the play between the attack and midfield. As well as functioning as a playmaker, and creating space, in the false 10 role, Montolivo was also able to alleviate the pressure placed upon Pirlo in the deep lying playmaker role, by supporting him defensively and providing Pirlo and the team with a secondary creative option.

Although Helenio Herrera's famous catenaccio tactics during the years of "La Grande Inter" in the 1960s were primarily thought to be associated with defensive yet effective football, creative playmakers played a fundamental part in Inter Milan's success during this period. Herrera and former Grande Inter players, including Mazzola and Facchetti, would state that they felt the Grande Inter side to be more offensive than it was often made out to be, and that imitators of Herrera's catenaccio tactics had often replicated his pragmatic style of football imperfectly. Luis Suárez (formerly an offensive playmaker who had first flourished under Herrera's more fluid, offensive tactics at Barcelona) was the primary creative force of Herrera's Inter side, functioning as a deep-lying playmaker, due to his ball skills, vision and passing range. Sandro Mazzola, in the role of a winger, attacking midfielder, inside-right or supporting striker, and Armando Picchi in the Libero or sweeper position, would also function as secondary playmakers at times, as well as left-winger Mario Corso. Aside from the strength of the almost impenetrable defence, some of the key elements of Herrera's Inter side were the use of vertical football and very quick, efficient and spectacular counter-attacks, which would lead to goals being scored with very few touches and passes. This was made possible due to Herrera's use of very quick, energetic, offensive, two-way full-backs to launch counter-attacks, such as Giacinto Facchetti, and Tarcisio Burgnich.

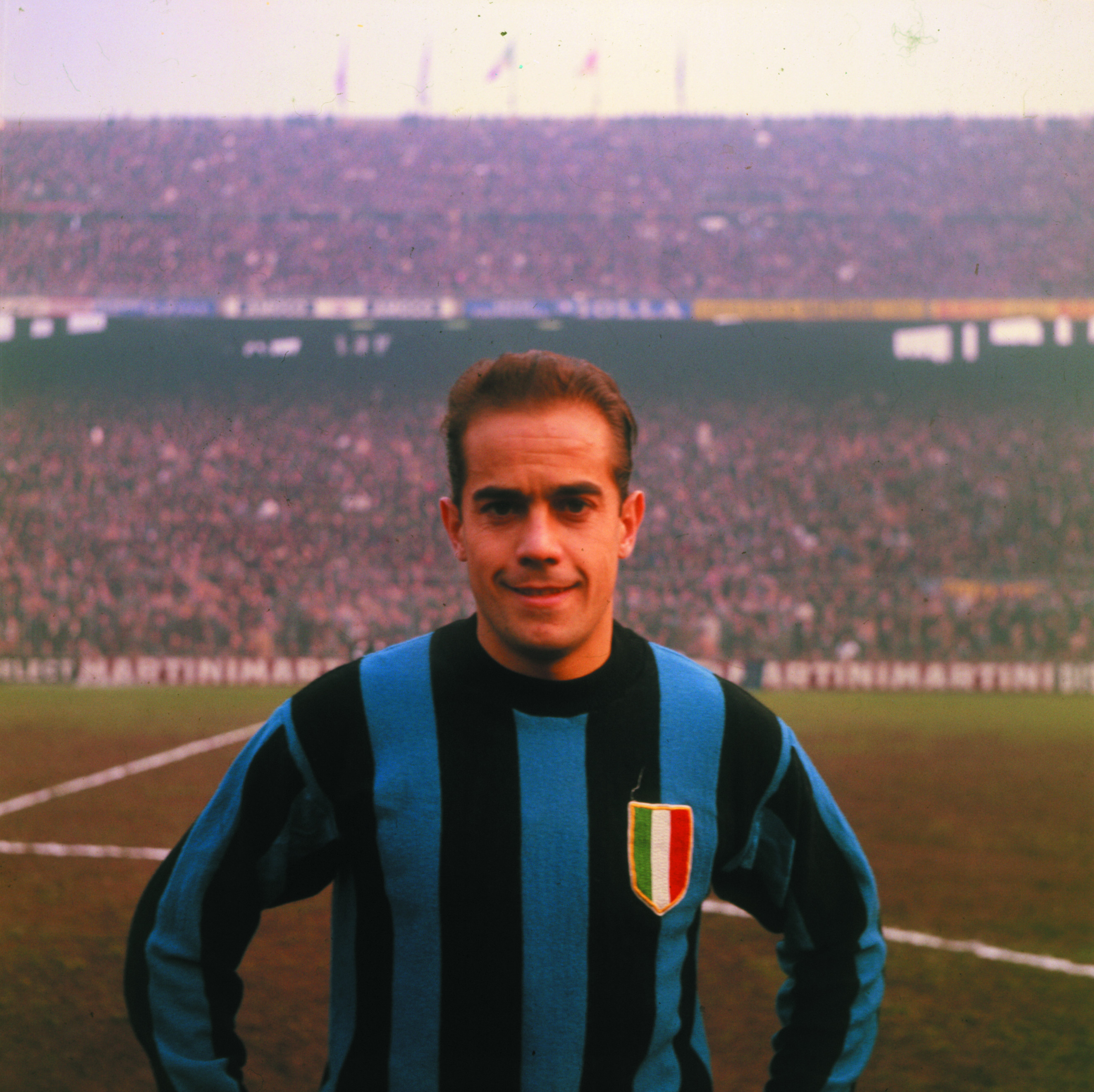
Spanish midfielder Luis Suárez was the main playmaker of the Grande Inter side of the 1960s under manager Helenio Herrera.

The quick, energetic technical wingers (Jair da Costa and Mario Corso) and offensive midfielder/supporting striker (Mazzola), would also occasionally move into deeper positions to support the midfield creatively and defensively, leaving the fullbacks with space to attack, which frequently caught the opposing teams by surprise. In Herrera's flexible 5–3–2 formation at Inter, four man-marking defenders were tightly assigned to each opposing attacker while an extra sweeper would recover loose balls and double mark when necessary. Under Herrera, most frequently during away matches in Europe, the highly organised and disciplined Inter players would usually defend by sitting patiently behind the ball, often leading to very closely contested victories. Upon winning back possession, Picchi, usually a traditional and defensive minded sweeper, would often advance into the midfield, and occasionally play long balls to the forwards, or, more frequently, carry the ball and play it towards Luis Suárez, whose playmaking ability played a crucial role in Inter's adeptness at counter-attacking football. Due to Suárez's outstanding vision and passing ability, he could quickly launch the forwards or full-backs on counter-attacks with quick long passes once he had received the ball, usually allowing the fullbacks to advance towards goal and score, or to help create goal-scoring chances. Under Herrera, Inter won three Serie A titles (two of them won consecutively), two consecutive European Cups and two consecutive Intercontinental Cups, and he was given the nickname "Il Mago" due to his success and tactical prowess.

=== Spanish football ===
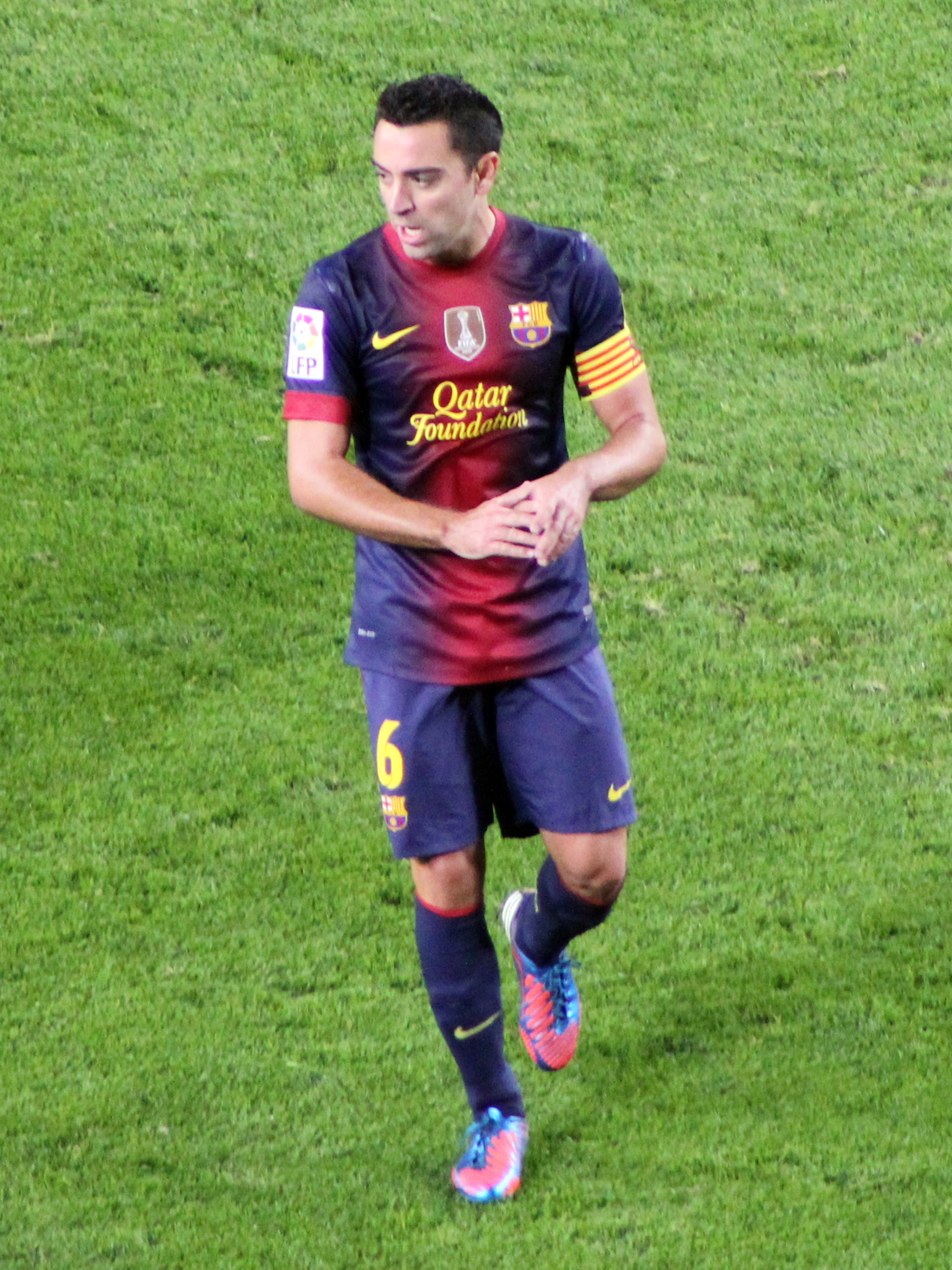
Spanish playmaker Xavi playing for Barcelona in 2012

During his highly successful spell as the head coach of Barcelona, Pep Guardiola was able to incorporate several skillful players with playmaker qualities into his team, such as Xavi, Andrés Iniesta, Sergio Busquets, Cesc Fàbregas and Lionel Messi, through the use of his personal variation on tiki-taka tactics, allowing the team to move the ball around, switch positions, create space by making attacking runs, and retain possession. His use of heavy pressing in his 4–3–3 formation gave each player defensive responsibilities when possession was lost. Guardiola also frequently deployed Messi in the false-9 role, which was particularly effective due to the frequency of attacking runs made by the Barcelona players, as well as their disciplined positioning, team-work, vision, technical skills, creativity, and passing ability, which allowed Messi to create and score several goals.

Vicente del Bosque also incorporated similar tactics (such as the use of tiki-taka, heavy pressing and the false-9 in a 4–3–3 or 4–6–0 formation) during his successful run of reaching three consecutive international finals as Spain's manager, between 2010 and 2013, winning the 2010 World Cup and UEFA Euro 2012. His tactics allowed several playmaking midfielders, such as Xabi Alonso, Sergio Busquets, Xavi, Andrés Iniesta, David Silva, Juan Mata and Cesc Fàbregas, to function together effectively.

== See also ==
- Association football positions
- Formation
- Forward
- Midfielder
- Defender
- Goalkeeper
- Point guard, a basketball position with a similar role to the association football playmaker, and actually translated "playmaker" in several European languages
- Quarterback, an American football position with a similar role to the association football deep-lying playmaker
- IFFHS World's Best Playmaker Award
- IFFHS World's Best Woman Playmaker Award
