= Ferruccio Valcareggi =

Italian footballer (1919–2005)

Personal information
- Date of birth: 12 February 1919
- Place of birth: Trieste, Italy
- Date of death: 2 November 2005 (aged 86)
- Place of death: Florence, Italy
- Position: Midfielder

Senior career*
Years	Team	Apps	(Gls)
1937–1940	Triestina		
1940–1943	Fiorentina		
1944	Milan		
1944–1947	Bologna		
1947–1948	Fiorentina		
1948–1949	Vicenza		
1949–1951	Lucchese		
1951–1952	Brescia		
1952–1954	Piombino		

Managerial career
- 1952–1954: Piombino
- 1954–1959: Prato
- 1959–1962: Atalanta
- 1962–1964: Fiorentina
- 1964–1965: Atalanta
- 1966–1974: Italy
- 1975–1978: Hellas Verona
- 1979–1980: Roma
- 1979–1984: Italy B
- 1985: Fiorentina
Medal record
Men's football
Representing Italy (as Manager)
UEFA European Championship
Winner	1968 Italy
FIFA World Cup
Runner-up	1970 Mexico
- * Club domestic league appearances and goals

Ferruccio Valcareggi (Italian pronunciation: [ferˈruttʃo valkaˈreddʒi]; 12 February 1919 – 2 November 2005) was an Italian football player and coach, who played as a midfielder.

== Playing career ==
Valcareggi was born in Trieste, on 12 February 1919. A right–sided, offensive–minded, central midfielder – known as a mezzala in Italian football jargon –, he had a successful playing career, playing for nine different teams, including clubs such as Fiorentina, A.C. Milan, Bologna, and his home-town club Triestina, with whom he began his career in 1937, ending his playing career in 1954 with Piombino. He won the Coppa Alta Italia with Bologna in 1946. He scored 73 goals in 403 matches, 59 of which came in Serie A, in 270 appearances. He was never capped at international level, however.

== Managerial career ==
Valcareggi is widely remembered for his success as a coach, in particular with Italy national football team. He began his coaching career as a player–manager with Piombino in 1952; after managing several Italian club sides (including Prato, helping the club to the 1956–57 Serie C title and Serie B promotion, as well as Atalanta and Fiorentina), he was named the Italian team's coach, replacing manager Edmondo Fabbri – under whom he served as an assistant – initially alongside Helenio Herrera, and later independently. He was in charge of the Italy national side between 1966 and 1974, guiding them to victory in the 1968 European Championship on home soil, and to the final in the 1970 FIFA World Cup in Mexico. Under Valcareggi, Italy lost only six games in eight years.

Despite his success with the national side, Valcareggi is also remembered for devising the infamous "staffetta" (relay) match strategy during the 1970 World Cup. Due to his focus on defensive stability, as well as the presence of two pure, prolific goalscoring strikers, Riva and Boninsegna, Valcareggi felt that it would not be possible to field Italy's two most revered advanced playmakers at the time, Gianni Rivera, and Sandro Mazzola, alongside each other. He believed the two creative players to be incompatible with each other, due to the rivalry between their respective clubs, and as he felt that deploying both players alongside the forwards would offset the balance within the starting line-up, in particular as Rivera, unlike Mazzola, was not renowned for his athleticism or defensive work-rate. When Mazzola had come down with a stomach flu, which affected his fitness, he therefore conceived the plan, which essentially consisted of Mazzola playing the first half of each match, whilst Rivera would play the second half when the opponents would begin to tire and offer him more space. Despite Italy's victory at the 1968 European Championship and their second-place finish at the 1970 World Cup, the tactic was widely criticised by the media, in particular due to Italy's negative performance during the group-stage and in the final defeat to Brazil, despite demonstrating their ability to successfully apply a more offensive, exciting style of play with Rivera in the semi-final against West Germany. The two players only played together briefly in the final, when Rivera came on for Boninsegna for the last six minutes of the match.

Valcareggi also helped Italy to qualify for the 1974 FIFA World Cup; although they were considered among the favourites to win the title, they were knocked out in the first round of the tournament, which led to Valcareggi stepping down from his position as Italy's head coach; during the tournament, he had an infamous falling out with Giorgio Chinaglia, who insulted Valcareggi upon being substituted. Following his international career, Valcareggi worked as a club coach in Italy with Hellas Verona and Roma, as well as the Italian youth B Team; he also briefly served as a pundit. He later also worked for Fiorentina's technical sector; he was inducted into the Fiorentina Hall of Fame in 2013.

== Style of management ==
With the Italy national team, Valcareggi's rigid tactics were largely inspired by the Italian catenaccio system that had been popularised by Inter manager Herrera during the 1960s, as demonstrated by his use of a sweeper behind two man–marking central defenders and a full-back, and his use of a strategy based on heavy defending and stability. Italy were known for their ability to grind out results successfully under his tenure, and defend narrow leads after scoring, due their ability to concede few goals, which led to criticism in the Italian media over the team's lack of goals and dull gameplay, but also proved to be an effective strategy. Despite the team's more defensive playing style, they also demonstrated their offensive capabilities under Valcareggi during the 1970 World Cup; due to the altitude, his team favoured a slower gameplay, avoiding excessive sprints, which highlighted the technical ability of his players. Valcareggi was also known for this infamous staffetta policy, which involved him using his two star, talented, and skilful playmakers – Mazzola and Rivera – for one half each during matches, so as not to offset the balance within the team. The more athletic, dynamic, and direct Mazzola would start matches, while the more creative but less mobile and hard-working Rivera would come on when the opponents would begin to tire, which would allow him to dictate the game in midfield with his passing. His team adopted a more attractive playing style leading up to the 1974 World Cup, but struggled in the final tournament, and suffered a disappointing first–round elimination, which Valcareggi attributed to a lack of a united team in the dressing room, and his own inability to manage the group of players he was coaching at the time effectively. In addition to his tactical intelligence and coaching ability, he was known for his ability to instill a sense of calm in his team, and for developing a close relationship with his players, despite his reserved character; he was also known for his fair-play approach and honesty, as well as his elegant attire.

== Personal life ==
In September 1943, Valcareggi married Anna Peruzzi, with whom he had three children.

== Death ==
Valcareggi died in Florence on 2 November 2005, at the age of 86.

== Honours ==
=== Player ===
Bologna

- Coppa Alta Italia: 1945–46

=== Coach ===
Prato

- Serie C: 1956–57

Italy

- UEFA European Championship: 1968
- FIFA World Cup runner-up: 1970

=== Individual ===
- Seminatore d'oro: 1956–57, 1972–73
- Italian Football Hall of Fame: 2011
- Fiorentina Hall of Fame
