= 2018–19 Empoli FC season =

Empoli
2018–19 season
- President: Fabrizio Corsi
- Manager: Aurelio Andreazzoli (until 5 November 2018); Giuseppe Iachini (from 6 November 2018 until 13 March 2019); Aurelio Andreazzoli (from 13 March 2019)
- Stadium: Stadio Carlo Castellani
- Serie A: 18th (relegated)
- Coppa Italia: Third round
- Top goalscorer: League: Francesco Caputo (14); All: Francesco Caputo (14)
Home colours	Away colours	Third colours

The 2018–19 season was Empoli Football Club's 83rd in existence and 13th season in Serie A. It was the club's first season back in the top-flight after suffering relegation at the end of the 2016–17 season.

== Players ==
=== Squad information ===
As of 22 February 2019
Appearances include league matches only

No.	Name	Nat	Position(s)	Date of birth (age)	Signed from	Signed in	Contract ends	Apps.	Goals	Notes
Goalkeepers
1	Ivan Provedel	(Italy)	GK	6 October 1991 (age 34)	(Italy) Chievo	2017	2021	38	0	
21	Filippo Perucchini	(Italy)	GK	19 August 1997 (age 28)	(Italy) Ascoli	2019	2020	0	0	
69	Bartłomiej Drągowski	(Poland)	GK	19 August 1997 (age 28)	(Italy) Fiorentina	2019	2019	2	0	Loan
Defenders
2	Giovanni Di Lorenzo	(Italy)	RB	4 August 1993 (age 32)	(Italy) Matera	2017	2022	60	2	
5	Frédéric Veseli	(Albania)	CB / RB / LB	20 November 1992 (age 33)	(Switzerland) Lugano	2016	2021	67	0	
13	Luca Antonelli	(Italy)	LB	11 February 1987 (age 39)	(Italy) Milan	2018	2021	10	0	
15	Lorenzo Polvani	(Italy)	CB	26 July 1994 (age 31)	(Italy) SPAL	2017	2020	7	0	
22	Domenico Maietta	(Italy)	CB	3 August 1982 (age 43)	(Italy) Bologna	2018	2019	31	1	
23	Manuel Pasqual	(Italy)	LB	13 March 1982 (age 44)	(Italy) Fiorentina	2016	2019	86	7	Captain
26	Matías Silvestre	(Argentina)	CB	25 September 1984 (age 41)	(Italy) Sampdoria	2018	2019	25	2	
32	Jacob Rasmussen	(Denmark)	CB / DM	28 May 1997 (age 29)	(Norway) Rosenborg	2018	2022	11	0	
34	Kevin Diks	(Netherlands)	RB / CB / LB	6 October 1996 (age 29)	(Italy) Fiorentina	2019	2020	0	0	
39	Cristian Dell'Orco	(Italy)	LB	10 February 1994 (age 32)	(Italy) Sassuolo	2019	2019	3	0	Loan
43	Dimitris Nikolaou	(Greece)	CB / LB	13 August 1998 (age 27)	(Greece) Olympiacos	2019	2019	0	0	Loan
Midfielders
4	Matteo Brighi	(Italy)	CM	14 February 1981 (age 45)	(Italy) Perugia	2018	2019	18	1	
6	Marko Pajač	(Croatia)	LB / CM / LM	11 May 1993 (age 33)	(Italy) Cagliari	2019	2019	1	0	Loan
8	Hamed Junior Traorè	(Ivory Coast)	AM	16 February 2000 (age 26)	(Italy) Youth Sector	2017	2022	30	0	
10	Ismaël Bennacer	(Algeria)	CM	1 December 1997 (age 28)	(England) Arsenal	2017	2021	63	2	
18	Afriyie Acquah	(Ghana)	CM	5 January 1992 (age 34)	(Italy) Torino	2018	2019	19	1	
28	Leonardo Capezzi	(Italy)	DM / CM	28 March 1995 (age 31)	(Italy) Sampdoria	2018	2019	9	0	Loan
33	Rade Krunić	(Bosnia and Herzegovina)	CM / AM	7 October 1993 (age 32)	(Serbia) Borac Čačak	2015	2021	105	12	
48	Salih Uçan	(Turkey)	CM / AM	6 January 1994 (age 32)	(Turkey) Fenerbahçe	2018	2019	8	1	Loan
Forwards
7	Levan Mchedlidze	(Georgia (country))	CF	24 March 1990 (age 36)	(Italy) Youth Sector	2008	2019	152	17	
11	Francesco Caputo	(Italy)	CF	6 August 1987 (age 38)	(Italy) Virtus Entella	2017	2021	66	38	
17	Diego Farias	(Brazil)	SS / RW / LW	10 May 1990 (age 36)	(Italy) Cagliari	2019	2019	4	1	Loan
20	Antonino La Gumina	(Italy)	CF	6 March 1996 (age 30)	(Italy) Palermo	2018	2023	21	2	
37	Dimitri Oberlin	(Switzerland)	CF / LW / SS	27 September 1997 (age 28)	(Switzerland) Basel	2019	2019	2	0	Loan
Players transferred during the season
6	Miha Zajc	(Slovenia)	AM	1 July 1994 (age 31)	(Slovenia) Olimpija Ljubljana	2017	2022	66	12	
9	Alejandro Rodríguez	(Spain)	CF / RW / LW	3 July 1991 (age 34)	(Italy) Chievo	2018	2019	6	4	Loan
17	Lorenzo Lollo	(Italy)	CM	8 December 1990 (age 35)	(Italy) Carpi	2017	2021	24	1	
19	Arnel Jakupović	(Austria)	CF / AM	29 May 1998 (age 27)	(Italy) Youth Sector	2017	2021	5	0	
21	Pietro Terracciano	(Italy)	GK	8 March 1990 (age 36)	(Italy) Catania	2017	2020	11	0	
27	Joel Untersee	(South Africa)	RB	11 February 1994 (age 32)	(Italy) Juventus	2017	2021	18	0	
29	Michał Marcjanik	(Poland)	CB	15 December 1994 (age 31)	(Poland) Arka Gdynia	2018	2021	0	0	
66	Samuel Mráz	(Slovakia)	CF / RW / LW	13 May 1997 (age 29)	(Slovakia) Žilina	2018	2022	6	1	
99	Andrea Fulignati	(Italy)	GK	31 October 1994 (age 31)	(Italy) Cesena	2018	2021	0	0	

== Transfers ==
=== In ===
Date	Pos.	Player	Age	Moving from	Fee	Notes	Source
1 July 2018	DF	(Italy) Simone Romagnoli	28	(Italy) Bologna	Free	Loan return	
6 August 2018	DF	(Argentina) Matías Silvestre	33	(Italy) Sampdoria	Undisclosed		
17 August 2018	MF	(Ghana) Afriyie Acquah	26	(Italy) Torino	€900,000		

==== Loans in ====
Date	Pos.	Player	Age	Moving from	Fee	Notes	Source
3 August 2018	MF	(Italy) Leonardo Capezzi	23	(Italy) Sampdoria	Loan	Loan with an option to buy and counter-option	

=== Out ===
Date	Pos.	Player	Age	Moving to	Fee	Notes	Source

==== Loans out ====
Date	Pos.	Player	Age	Moving to	Fee	Notes	Source

== Competitions ==
=== Serie A ===
==== League table ====
Pos	Team	Pld	W	D	L	GF	GA	GD	Pts	Qualification or relegation
16	Fiorentina	38	8	17	13	47	45	+2	41 (Note: Positions determined by head-to-head points: Parma: 9 pts; Cagliari: 7 pts; Fiorentina: 1 pt.)	
17	Genoa	38	8	14	16	39	57	−18	38 (Note: Genoa finished ahead of Empoli on head-to-head points: Genoa 2–1 Empoli, Empoli 1–3 Genoa.)	
18	Empoli (R)	38	10	8	20	51	70	−19	38	Relegation to Serie B
19	Frosinone (R)	38	5	10	23	29	69	−40	25	Relegation to Serie B
20	Chievo (R)	38	2	14	22	25	75	−50	17 (Note: Chievo were deducted 3 points after being found guilty of false accounting.)	Relegation to Serie B

Source: Serie A, Soccerway
Rules for classification: 1) Points; 2) Head-to-head points; 3) Head-to-head goal difference; 4) Goal difference; 5) Goals scored; 6) Draw. (Note: Head-to-head record is used only after all the matches between the teams in question have been played).
(R) Relegated

==== Results summary ====
Overall								Home						Away					
Pld	W	D	L	GF	GA	GD	Pts	W	D	L	GF	GA	GD	W	D	L	GF	GA	GD
38	10	8	20	51	70	−19	38	9	3	7	33	30	+3	1	5	13	18	40	−22

Last updated: 26 May 2019.
Source: Competitive matches

==== Results by round ====
Round	1	2	3	4	5	6	7	8	9	10	11	12	13	14	15	16	17	18	19	20	21	22	23	24	25	26	27	28	29	30	31	32	33	34	35	36	37	38
Ground	H	A	A	H	A	H	A	H	A	H	A	H	H	A	H	A	H	A	H	A	H	H	A	H	A	H	A	H	A	H	A	A	H	A	H	A	H	A
Result	W	L	D	L	L	D	L	L	D	L	L	W	W	D	W	L	L	L	L	D	L	D	L	W	L	D	L	W	L	W	L	D	L	L	W	W	W	L
Position	2	10	8	16	17	17	18	18	18	18	18	18	17	17	14	14	15	16	17	17	17	17	18	17	17	17	17	17	18	17	18	18	18	18	18	18	17	18

Updated to match(es) played on 26 May 2019. Source: Competitive matches
A = Away; H = Home; W = Win; D = Draw; L = Loss

==== Matches ====
19 August 2018 1	Empoli	2–0	Cagliari	Empoli
20:30 CEST (UTC+02:00)	Krunić 14'; Antonelli (yellow card) 28'; Caputo 51'; Capezzi (yellow card) 66'; Rasmussen (yellow card) 90'	Report	Romagna (yellow card) 44'; Barella (yellow card) 76'; Pisacane (yellow card) 90+2'	Stadium: Stadio Carlo Castellani; Attendance: 7,335; Referee: Daniele Chiffi

26 August 2018 2	Genoa	2–1	Empoli	Genoa
20:30 CEST (UTC+02:00)	Piątek 6'; Kouamé 18'; Spolli (yellow card) 45'; Criscito (yellow card) 52'; Zukanović (yellow card) 59'	Report	Silvestre (yellow card) 85'; Krunić (yellow card) 90+2'; Mráz 90+4'	Stadium: Stadio Luigi Ferraris; Attendance: 19,493; Referee: Livio Marinelli

2 September 2018 3	Chievo	0–0	Empoli	Verona
20:30 CEST (UTC+02:00)	Rigoni (yellow card) 55'	Report	Di Lorenzo (yellow card) 90+3'	Stadium: Stadio Marc'Antonio Bentegodi; Attendance: 9,000; Referee: Piero Giacomelli

16 September 2018 4	Empoli	0–1	Lazio	Empoli
18:00 CEST (UTC+02:00)	Silvestre (yellow card) 7'; Bennacer (yellow card) 34'	Report	Parolo (yellow card) 42', (goal) 47'; Durmisi (yellow card) 80'; Marušić (yellow card) 87'	Stadium: Stadio Carlo Castellani; Attendance: 10,832; Referee: Daniele Orsato

21 September 2018 5	Sassuolo	3–1	Empoli	Reggio Emilia
20:30 CEST (UTC+02:00)	Boateng 13'; Di Francesco (yellow card) 31', (goal) 85'; Ferrari 57'	Report	Caputo 1'; Capezzi (yellow card) 6'; Krunić (yellow card) 11'; Zajc (yellow card) 45+1' (yellow-red card) 71'	Stadium: Mapei Stadium – Città del Tricolore; Attendance: 10,183; Referee: Federico La Penna

27 September 2018 6	Empoli	1–1	Milan	Empoli
21:00 CEST (UTC+2)	Maietta (yellow card) 53'; Capezzi (yellow card) 55'; Caputo 71' (pen.)	Report	Capezzi 10' (o.g.); Calabria (yellow card) 45+1'; Laxalt (yellow card) 84'	Stadium: Stadio Carlo Castellani; Attendance: 13,890; Referee: Michael Fabbri

30 September 2018 7	Parma	1–0	Empoli	Parma
18:00 CEST (UTC+02:00)	Gervinho 33'; Iacoponi (yellow card) 35'; Barillà (yellow card) 82'	Report	Rasmussen (yellow card) 23'; Di Lorenzo (yellow card) 31'; Traorè (yellow card) 87'	Stadium: Stadio Ennio Tardini; Attendance: 14,584; Referee: Luca Pairetto

6 October 2018 8	Empoli	0–2	Roma	Empoli
20:30 CEST (UTC+02:00)	Bennacer (yellow card) 35'; Silvestre (yellow card) 83'	Report	Nzonzi 36'; Lu. Pellegrini (yellow card) 49'; Džeko 85'	Stadium: Stadio Carlo Castellani; Attendance: 10,670; Referee: Paolo Mazzoleni

21 October 2018 9	Frosinone	3–3	Empoli	Frosinone
12:30 CEST (UTC+02:00)	Silvestre 8' (o.g.); Ciofani 54' (pen.), 63'; Molinaro (yellow card) 88'; Ciano (yellow card) 90+1'	Report	Zajc (yellow card) 6', (goal) 32'; Silvestre 48'; Maietta (yellow card) 69'; Uçan 79'; Bennacer (yellow card) 86'	Stadium: Stadio Benito Stirpe; Attendance: 12,287; Referee: Daniele Orsato

27 October 2018 10	Empoli	1–2	Juventus	Empoli
18:00 CEST (UTC+02:00)	Caputo 28'; Traorè (yellow card) 58'; Uçan (yellow card) 90+1'	Report	Bernardeschi (yellow card) 43'; Bentancur (yellow card) 45+3'; Ronaldo 54' (pen.), 70'; Dybala (yellow card) 78'	Stadium: Stadio Carlo Castellani; Attendance: 15,889; Referee: Gianpaolo Calvarese

2 November 2018 11	Napoli	5–1	Empoli	Naples
20:30 CET (UTC+01:00)	Insigne 9'; Mertens 38', 64', 90+3'; Milik 90'	Report	Bennacer (yellow card) 42'; Caputo 58'; Di Lorenzo (yellow card) 86'	Stadium: Stadio San Paolo; Attendance: 31,370; Referee: Luca Pairetto

11 November 2018 12	Empoli	2–1	Udinese	Empoli
15:00 CET (UTC+01:00)	Di Lorenzo (yellow card) 21'; Zajc 41'; Krunić (yellow card) 45+1'; Caputo 51'	Report	Mandragora (yellow card) 25'; Fofana (yellow card) 40'; Pussetto 81'	Stadium: Stadio Carlo Castellani; Attendance: 7,553; Referee: Piero Giacomelli

25 November 2018 13	Empoli	3–2	Atalanta	Empoli
15:00 CET (UTC+01:00)	Veseli (yellow card) 24'; La Gumina 42'; Maietta (yellow card) 67'; Masiello 77' (o.g.); Silvestre 90+2'	Report	Freuler 33'; Masiello (yellow card) 38'; Hateboer 40'; Gosens (yellow card) 69'; Iličić (yellow card) 84' (red card) 84'	Stadium: Stadio Carlo Castellani; Attendance: 8,736; Referee: Gianluca Manganiello

1 December 2018 14	SPAL	2–2	Empoli	Ferrara
15:00 CET (UTC+01:00)	Kurtić 5', 67', (yellow card) 54'; Felipe (yellow card) 34'; Schiattarella (yellow card) 45+2'; Cionek (red card) 49'	Report	Maietta (yellow card) 15'; Caputo 24'; Krunić 43', (yellow card) 45'; Mchedlidze (yellow card) 90'	Stadium: Stadio Paolo Mazza; Attendance: 12,622; Referee: Paolo Mazzoleni

9 December 2018 15	Empoli	2–1	Bologna	Empoli
15:00 CET (UTC+01:00)	Caputo 10'; Veseli (yellow card) 35'; Capezzi (yellow card) 45+2'; La Gumina 80'	Report	Poli (yellow card) 23', (goal) 41'; Džemaili (yellow card) 87'	Stadium: Stadio Carlo Castellani; Attendance: 8,379; Referee: Paolo Valeri
Note: Leonardo Capezzi was cautioned for dissent while a substitute.

16 December 2018 16	Fiorentina	3–1	Empoli	Florence
15:00 CET (UTC+01:00)	Mirallas 40'; Benassi (yellow card) 53'; Simeone 59'; Gerson (yellow card) 65'; Dabo 78'	Report	Krunić 24', (yellow card) 55'	Stadium: Stadio Artemio Franchi; Attendance: 28,918; Referee: Piero Giacomelli

22 December 2018 17	Empoli	2–4	Sampdoria	Empoli
15:00 CET (UTC+01:00)	Pasqual 11' (pen.); Acquah (yellow card) 33'; Caputo (yellow card) 34', (goal) 75'; La Gumina (yellow card) 85'	Report	Andersen (yellow card) 18'; Ramírez 41'; Quagliarella 69', (yellow card) 71'; Ekdal (yellow card) 82'; Caprari 87', 90+1', (yellow card) 88'	Stadium: Stadio Carlo Castellani; Attendance: 8,815; Referee: Gianpaolo Calvarese

26 December 2018 18	Torino	3–0	Empoli	Turin
18:00 CET (UTC+01:00)	Rincón (yellow card) 19'; Nkoulou 44'; De Silvestri 49'; Falque 75'	Report	Veseli (yellow card) 42'; Silvestre (yellow card) 56'; Di Lorenzo (yellow card) 71'; Krunić (red card) 89'	Stadium: Stadio Olimpico Grande Torino; Attendance: 20,047; Referee: Fabio Maresca

29 December 2018 19	Empoli	0–1	Internazionale	Empoli
15:00 CET (UTC+01:00)	Bennacer (yellow card) 74'	Report	Martínez (yellow card) 68'; Keita 72'	Stadium: Stadio Carlo Castellani; Attendance: 10,393; Referee: Federico La Penna

20 January 2019 20	Cagliari	2–2	Empoli	Cagliari
18:00 CET (UTC+01:00)	Pavoletti 36'; Farias 90+1'	Report	Di Lorenzo 70'; Zajc 81'	Stadium: Sardegna Arena; Attendance: 13,836; Referee: Fabrizio Pasqua

28 January 2019 21	Empoli	1–3	Genoa	Empoli
20:30 CET (UTC+01:00)	Rasmussen (yellow card) 61'; Di Lorenzo 63'	Report	Kouamé 18'; Bessa (yellow card) 39'; Rolón (yellow card) 58'; Lazović 70'; Sanabria 73'	Stadium: Stadio Carlo Castellani; Attendance: 7,675; Referee: Federico La Penna

2 February 2019 22	Empoli	2–2	Chievo	Empoli
15:00 CET (UTC+01:00)	Caputo 45+2', 52'	Report	Jaroszyński (yellow card) 25'; Giaccherini 31'; Stępiński 45+1'; Barba (yellow card) 90+2'	Stadium: Stadio Carlo Castellani; Attendance: 7,030; Referee: Marco Di Bello

7 February 2019 23	Lazio	1–0	Empoli	Rome
20:30 CET (UTC+01:00)	Caicedo 42' (pen.); Neto (yellow card) 90+4'	Report	Acquah (yellow card) 89'	Stadium: Stadio Olimpico; Attendance: 23,000; Referee: Daniele Chiffi

17 February 2019 24	Empoli	3–0	Sassuolo	Empoli
15:00 CET (UTC+01:00)	Krunić 34'; Acquah 37'; Farias 60'; Pasqual (yellow card) 71'	Report	Sensi (yellow card) 57'; Berardi (yellow card) 65'; Bourabia (yellow card) 84'	Stadium: Stadio Carlo Castellani; Attendance: 7,192; Referee: Maurizio Mariani

22 February 2019 25	Milan	3–0	Empoli	Milan
20:30 CET (UTC+01:00)	Piątek 49'; Kessié 51'; Castillejo 67'; Çalhanoğlu (yellow card) 71'	Report	Di Lorenzo (yellow card) 55'	Stadium: San Siro; Attendance: 47,866; Referee: Piero Giacomelli

2 March 2019 26	Empoli	3–3	Parma	Empoli
15:00 CET (UTC+01:00)	Drągowski (yellow card) 13'; Dell'Orco 19'; Caputo 59' (pen.); Alves 90+1' (o.g.)	Report	Gervinho 13', (yellow card) 79'; Rigoni 45+1'; Kucka (yellow card) 62'; Alves 82'; Iacoponi (yellow card) 90+7'	Stadium: Stadio Carlo Castellani; Attendance: 8,404; Referee: Marco Di Bello

11 March 2019 27	Roma	2–1	Empoli	Rome
20:30 CET (UTC+01:00)	El Shaarawy 9', (yellow card) 62'; Florenzi (yellow card) 13' (yellow-red card) 80'; Cristante (yellow card) 13'; Schick 33'	Report	Juan Jesus 12' (o.g.); Acquah (yellow card) 37'	Stadium: Stadio Olimpico; Attendance: 34,508; Referee: Fabio Maresca

17 March 2019 28	Empoli	2–1	Frosinone	Empoli
15:00 CET (UTC+01:00)	Caputo 20' (pen.); Pajač 38'; Pasqual (yellow card) 78'; Drągowski (yellow card) 90+4'; Acquah (yellow card) 90+5'; Silvestre (yellow card) 90+6'	Report	Valzania (yellow card) 68', (goal) 70'; Goldaniga (yellow card) 75'	Stadium: Stadio Carlo Castellani; Attendance: 7,828; Referee: Davide Massa

30 March 2019 29	Juventus	1–0	Empoli	Turin
18:00 CET (UTC+01:00)	Kean 72'	Report		Stadium: Allianz Stadium; Attendance: 39,290; Referee: Federico La Penna

3 April 2019 30	Empoli	2–1	Napoli	Empoli
19:00 CEST (UTC+02:00)	Farias 28'; Traorè (yellow card) 50'; Di Lorenzo 53'; Pajač (yellow card) 60'	Report	Koulibaly (yellow card) 33'; Zieliński 44'; Milik (yellow card) 47'	Stadium: Stadio Carlo Castellani; Attendance: 10,911; Referee: Daniele Doveri

7 April 2019 31	Udinese	3–2	Empoli	Udine
15:00 CEST (UTC+02:00)	Samir (yellow card) 10'; De Paul 15', 41' (pen.); Mandragora 45', (yellow card) 87'; Zeegelaar (yellow card) 58' (yellow-red card) 63'	Report	Caputo 11', (yellow card) 90+2'; Pajač (yellow card) 18'; Krunić 24'; Maietta (yellow card) 40'; Silvestre (yellow card) 44'	Stadium: Dacia Arena; Attendance: 22,537; Referee: Daniele Orsato

15 April 2019 32	Atalanta	0–0	Empoli	Bergamo
20:30 CEST (UTC+02:00)	Palomino (yellow card) 19'	Report	Dell'Orco (yellow card) 29'; Bennacer (yellow card) 45+2'; Veseli (yellow card) 61'	Stadium: Stadio Atleti Azzurri d'Italia; Attendance: 19,229; Referee: Gianluca Manganiello

20 April 2019 33	Empoli	2–4	SPAL	Empoli
15:00 CEST (UTC+02:00)	Caputo 22'; Traorè 47', (yellow card) 52'; Brighi (yellow card) 76'; Krunić (yellow card) 90+1'	Report	Lazzari (yellow card) 30'; Petagna 38' (pen.), 60', (yellow card) 62'; Cionek (yellow card) 40'; Floccari 44'; Missiroli (yellow card) 71'; Murgia (yellow card) 82'; Antenucci 88'	Stadium: Stadio Carlo Castellani; Attendance: 10,444; Referee: Gianluca Rocchi

27 April 2019 34	Bologna	3–1	Empoli	Bologna
15:00 CEST (UTC+02:00)	Mbaye (yellow card) 25'; Orsolini (yellow card) 35', (goal) 83'; Soriano 52', (yellow card) 79'; Sansone 90+5'	Report	Pajač (yellow card) 7', (goal) 17'; Krunić (yellow card) 54'	Stadium: Stadio Renato Dall'Ara; Attendance: 25,189; Referee: Paolo Valeri

5 May 2019 35	Empoli	1–0	Fiorentina	Empoli
12:30 CEST (UTC+02:00)	Pajač (yellow card) 24'; Farias 54'; Bennacer (yellow card) 65'; Di Lorenzo (yellow card) 79'	Report	Fernandes (yellow card) 23'	Stadium: Stadio Carlo Castellani; Attendance: 8,285; Referee: Massimiliano Irrati

12 May 2019 36	Sampdoria	1–2	Empoli	Genoa
15:00 CEST (UTC+02:00)	Ekdal (yellow card) 30'; Tonelli (yellow card) 74'; Quagliarella 90+2' (pen.)	Report	Di Lorenzo (yellow card) 17', (goal) 75'; Farias 56'	Stadium: Stadio Luigi Ferraris; Attendance: 19,034; Referee: Daniele Doveri

19 May 2019 37	Empoli	4–1	Torino	Empoli
15:00 CEST (UTC+02:00)	Acquah 27'; Brighi 65'; Di Lorenzo 70'; Farias (yellow card) 71'; Caputo 89'	Report	Falque 56'; Berenguer (yellow card) 84'	Stadium: Stadio Carlo Castellani; Attendance: 10,344; Referee: Paolo Mazzoleni

26 May 2019 38	Internazionale	2–1	Empoli	Milan
20:30 CEST (UTC+02:00)	Keita 51', (yellow card) 52' (yellow-red card) 90+7'; Perišić (yellow card) 72'; Nainggolan 81'; D'Ambrosio (yellow card) 90+9'	Report	Pajač (yellow card) 64'; Traorè 76'; Caputo (yellow card) 90+5'; Perucchini (red card) 90+8'	Stadium: San Siro; Attendance: 68,051; Referee: Luca Banti

=== Coppa Italia ===
12 August 2018 Third round	Empoli	0–3	Cittadella	Empoli
20:30 CEST (UTC+02:00)		Report	Scappini 16', 54'; Proia (yellow card) 30' (yellow-red card) 67'; Finotto 65'	Stadium: Stadio Carlo Castellani; Attendance: 3,000; Referee: Juan Luca Sacchi

== Statistics ==
=== Appearances and goals ===
No.	Pos	Nat	Player	Total		Serie A		Coppa Italia	
No.	Pos	Nat	Player	Apps	Goals	Apps	Goals	Apps	Goals
Goalkeepers
1	GK	(Italy) ITA	Ivan Provedel	16	0	16	0	0	0
21	GK	(Italy) ITA	Filippo Perucchini	0	0	0	0	0	0
40	GK	(Italy) ITA	Gianluca Saro	0	0	0	0	0	0
69	GK	(Poland) POL	Bartłomiej Drągowski	7	0	7	0	0	0
Defenders
2	DF	(Italy) ITA	Giovanni Di Lorenzo	31	3	30	3	1	0
5	DF	(Albania) ALB	Frédéric Veseli	25	0	23+2	0	0	0
13	DF	(Italy) ITA	Luca Antonelli	12	0	9+3	0	0	0
15	DF	(Italy) ITA	Lorenzo Polvani	0	0	0	0	0	0
22	DF	(Italy) ITA	Domenico Maietta	19	0	18	0	1	0
23	DF	(Italy) ITA	Manuel Pasqual	21	1	13+7	1	1	0
26	DF	(Argentina) ARG	Matías Silvestre	31	2	30	2	1	0
32	DF	(Denmark) DEN	Jacob Rasmussen	12	0	9+2	0	1	0
34	DF	(Netherlands) NED	Kevin Diks	0	0	0	0	0	0
39	DF	(Italy) ITA	Cristian Dell'Orco	7	1	7	1	0	0
43	DF	(Greece) GRE	Dimitris Nikolaou	0	0	0	0	0	0
Midfielders
4	MF	(Italy) ITA	Matteo Brighi	6	0	1+5	0	0	0
6	MF	(Croatia) CRO	Marko Pajač	5	1	4+1	1	0	0
8	MF	(Ivory Coast) CIV	Hamed Traorè	26	0	19+6	0	0+1	0
10	MF	(Algeria) ALG	Ismaël Bennacer	31	0	25+5	0	1	0
18	MF	(Ghana) GHA	Afriyie Acquah	23	1	17+6	1	0	0
28	MF	(Italy) ITA	Leonardo Capezzi	10	0	8+1	0	0+1	0
33	MF	(Bosnia and Herzegovina) BIH	Rade Krunić	29	5	28	5	1	0
48	MF	(Turkey) TUR	Salih Uçan	12	1	1+11	1	0	0
77	MF	(Liechtenstein) LIE	Marcel Büchel	0	0	0	0	0	0
Forwards
7	FW	(Georgia (country)) GEO	Levan Mchedlidze	10	0	0+9	0	0+1	0
11	FW	(Italy) ITA	Francesco Caputo	32	14	31	14	1	0
17	FW	(Brazil) BRA	Diego Farias	10	2	10	2	0	0
20	FW	(Italy) ITA	Antonino La Gumina	23	2	12+10	2	1	0
37	FW	(Switzerland) SUI	Dimitri Oberlin	4	0	0+4	0	0	0
Players transferred out during the season
6	MF	(Slovenia) SVN	Miha Zajc	21	3	12+8	3	1	0
9	FW	(Spain) ESP	Alejandro Rodríguez	1	0	0+1	0	0	0
21	GK	(Italy) ITA	Pietro Terracciano	9	0	8	0	1	0
27	DF	(South Africa) RSA	Joel Untersee	3	0	1+2	0	0	0
66	FW	(Slovakia) SVK	Samuel Mráz	6	1	2+4	1	0	0
99	GK	(Italy) ITA	Andrea Fulignati	0	0	0	0	0	0

Last updated: 7 April 2019
Source: Competitions

=== Goalscorers ===
Rank	No.	Pos	Nat	Name	Serie A	Coppa Italia	Total
1	11	FW	(Italy)	Francesco Caputo	14	0	14
2	33	MF	(Bosnia and Herzegovina)	Rade Krunić	5	0	5
3	2	DF	(Italy)	Giovanni Di Lorenzo	3	0	3
3	6	MF	(Slovenia)	Miha Zajc	3	0	3
5	17	FW	(Brazil)	Diego Farias	2	0	2
5	20	FW	(Italy)	Antonino La Gumina	2	0	2
5	26	DF	(Argentina)	Matías Silvestre	2	0	2
8	6	MF	(Croatia)	Marko Pajač	1	0	1
8	18	MF	(Ghana)	Afriyie Acquah	1	0	1
8	23	DF	(Italy)	Manuel Pasqual	1	0	1
8	39	DF	(Italy)	Cristian Dell'Orco	1	0	1
8	48	MF	(Turkey)	Salih Uçan	1	0	1
8	66	FW	(Slovakia)	Samuel Mráz	1	0	1
Own goal					3	0	3
Totals					40	0	40

Last updated: 7 April 2019

=== Clean sheets ===
Rank	No.	Pos	Nat	Name	Serie A	Coppa Italia	Total
1	21	GK	(Italy)	Pietro Terracciano	2	0	2
2	69	GK	(Italy)	Bartłomiej Drągowski	1	0	1
Totals					3	0	3

Last updated: 7 April 2019

=== Disciplinary record ===
No.	Pos	Nat	Name	Serie A			Coppa Italia			Total		
No.	Pos	Nat	Name	Booked	(yellow card) (yellow-red card)	Sent off (straight red)	Booked	(yellow card) (yellow-red card)	Sent off (straight red)	Booked	(yellow card) (yellow-red card)	Sent off (straight red)
69	DF	(Poland)	Bartłomiej Drągowski	2	0	0	0	0	0	2	0	0
2	DF	(Italy)	Giovanni Di Lorenzo	6	0	0	0	0	0	6	0	0
5	DF	(Albania)	Frédéric Veseli	3	0	0	0	0	0	3	0	0
13	DF	(Italy)	Luca Antonelli	1	0	0	0	0	0	1	0	0
22	DF	(Italy)	Domenico Maietta	5	0	0	0	0	0	5	0	0
23	DF	(Italy)	Manuel Pasqual	2	0	0	0	0	0	2	0	0
26	DF	(Argentina)	Matías Silvestre	6	0	0	0	0	0	6	0	0
32	DF	(Denmark)	Jacob Rasmussen	3	0	0	0	0	0	3	0	0
6	MF	(Croatia)	Marko Pajač	2	0	0	0	0	0	2	0	0
6	MF	(Slovenia)	Miha Zajc	1	1	0	0	0	0	1	1	0
8	MF	(Ivory Coast)	Hamed Traorè	3	0	0	0	0	0	3	0	0
10	MF	(Algeria)	Ismaël Bennacer	5	0	0	0	0	0	5	0	0
18	MF	(Ghana)	Afriyie Acquah	4	0	0	0	0	0	4	0	0
28	MF	(Italy)	Leonardo Capezzi	4	0	0	0	0	0	4	0	0
33	MF	(Bosnia and Herzegovina)	Rade Krunić	5	0	1	0	0	0	5	0	1
48	MF	(Turkey)	Salih Uçan	1	0	0	0	0	0	1	0	0
7	FW	(Georgia (country))	Levan Mchedlidze	1	0	0	0	0	0	1	0	0
11	FW	(Italy)	Francesco Caputo	2	0	0	0	0	0	2	0	0
20	FW	(Italy)	Antonino La Gumina	1	0	0	0	0	0	1	0	0
Totals				57	1	1	0	0	0	57	1	1

Last updated: 7 April 2019
