= 1956–57 Serie C =

Italian football league season

The 1956–57 Serie C was the nineteenth edition of Serie C, the third highest league in the Italian football league system.

There were only three relegations because of the reform of the IV Serie.

== Final classification ==
Pos	Team	Pld	W	D	L	GF	GA	GD	Pts	Promotion or relegation
1	Prato	34	19	10	5	50	20	+30	48	Promoted to Serie B
2	Lecco	34	16	13	5	43	23	+20	45	Promoted to Serie B
3	Salernitana	34	18	8	8	47	27	+20	44	
4	Reggiana	34	14	10	10	39	31	+8	38	
5	Cremonese	34	14	9	11	38	37	+1	37	
6	Mestre	34	11	14	9	47	44	+3	36	
7	Biellese	34	12	10	12	43	47	−4	34	
8	Pavia (Note: The club went bankrupt on September 11, 1957. It was relegated to the regional leagues.)	34	11	11	12	34	39	−5	33	Relegated
9	Reggina	34	12	8	14	33	29	+4	32	
10	Siena	34	11	10	13	40	42	−2	32	
11	Carbosarda	34	13	6	15	46	49	−3	32	
12	Livorno	34	11	9	14	36	36	0	31	
13	Sanremese	34	11	9	14	38	44	−6	31	
14	Catanzaro	34	11	9	14	22	29	−7	31	
15	Vigevano	34	12	7	15	45	55	−10	31	
16	Siracusa (Note: Relegated and later readmitted in place of A.C. Pavia.)	34	9	11	14	28	43	−15	29	
17	Treviso	34	8	10	16	33	49	−16	26	Relegated to IV Serie
18	Molfetta	34	8	6	20	35	53	−18	22	Relegated to IV Serie
