= Samuel Mráz =

Slovak footballer (born 1997)

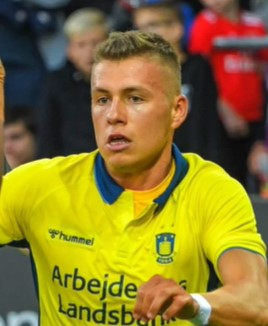
- Mráz with Brøndby in 2019

Personal information
- Date of birth: 13 May 1997 (age 29)
- Place of birth: Malacky, Slovakia
- Height: 1.83 m (6 ft 0 in)
- Position: Forward

Team information
- Current team: Servette
- Number: 90

Youth career
- 2003–2007: ŠK Malacky
- 2007–2009: TJ Záhoran Kostolište
- 2009–2014: Senica

Senior career*
Years	Team	Apps	(Gls)
2014–2016	Senica	63	(5)
2017–2018	Žilina	45	(23)
2018–2021	Empoli	6	(1)
2019	→ Crotone (loan)	5	(1)
2019–2020	→ Brøndby (loan)	22	(4)
2020–2021	→ Zagłębie Lubin (loan)	27	(2)
2021–2023	Spezia	2	(0)
2021–2022	→ Slovan Bratislava (loan)	19	(7)
2022–2023	→ Mirandés (loan)	11	(0)
2023	→ Anorthosis (loan)	19	(6)
2023	Volos	3	(0)
2024–2025	Motor Lublin	50	(22)
2025–	Servette	42	(11)

International career^{‡}
- Slovakia U16
2013	Slovakia U17	3	(0)
2015–2016	Slovakia U19	6	(1)
2017–2018	Slovakia U21	6	(4)
2018–	Slovakia	12	(1)
- * Club domestic league appearances and goals as of 28 September 2026 ‡ National team caps and goals as of 22:40, 31 March 2026 (UTC)

Samuel Mráz (born 13 May 1997) is a Slovak professional footballer who plays as a forward for Swiss Super League club Servette and the Slovakia national team. He has played professionally in eight countries.

Mráz began his career at Senica and joined Žilina in 2017, winning the Slovak First Football League in his first half-season and finishing the next as the division's top scorer with 21 goals, for which he was named its player of the year. He signed for Empoli in 2018 and became the first Slovak to score on his Serie A debut, but started regularly for neither Empoli nor Spezia, whom he joined in 2021, and spent much of the following four years on loan at Crotone, Brøndby, Zagłębie Lubin, Slovan Bratislava, Mirandés and Anorthosis Famagusta, winning a second Slovak title with Slovan in 2021–22. After three appearances in five months at Volos in Greece, he joined Motor Lublin in February 2024 and helped the club win promotion to the Ekstraklasa for the first time in 32 years, before scoring 16 league goals in its first season back in the top division. He moved to Servette in 2025.

Mráz represented Slovakia from under-16 to under-21 level and was the Slovak First Football League's leading scorer when he made his senior debut in October 2018, as a substitute in a friendly draw with Sweden. He has won 12 caps, scoring once, against Jordan in 2019.

== Club career ==
=== Senica ===
Mráz started his football career at hometown club ŠK Malacky, before first moving to TJ Záhoran Kostolište and later to the youth academy of Senica. In July 2013, Scottish club Celtic showed their interest in him, but in the end he chose to stay in Senica. In February 2014, he won a poll for Best Athlete in the City of Senica in 2013 in the collective category of under-17s.

Mráz made his professional debut for Senica against AS Trenčín on 12 April 2014 as a starter, before being substituted in the 62nd minute. That year, he was in the starting lineup eight times under head coach Pavel Hapal. On 30 June 2014, he signed a new contract with the team until the end of the 2016–17 season. He scored his first goal for Senica that season in a league match 28 November 2014; a regional derby against Spartak Trnava, which ended in a 1–1 draw. On 25 February 2015, was awarded Best Athlete in the City of 2014 in the under-19 collective category. He made 15 appearances that year.

=== Empoli ===
On 19 July 2018, Mráz joined newly promoted Serie A team Empoli. Empoli's coach Aurelio Andreazzoli fielded Mráz for his first league fixture on 26 August 2018, against Genoa in a 2-1 defeat. Mráz came on in 77th minute for Antonino La Gumina. He also became the first Slovak to score in his Serie A debut, when he scored against Federico Marchetti in the 94th minute, after a cross from Giovanni Di Lorenzo.

On 30 September 2018, he was selected in the starting XI of a game in Italy for the first time. He played 60 minutes of the game against Parma, which Empoli lost 0-1.

==== Loan to Crotone ====
On 30 January 2019, Mráz joined Serie B club Crotone on loan until 30 June 2019. On 10 February, he made his debut in a home match against Verona while scoring his first goal for I Rossoblu two weeks later in a 3–0 home win over Palermo.

==== Loan to Brøndby ====
In August 2019, Mráz moved to Danish Superliga club Brøndby IF on a one-season loan while his new club secured an option to sign him on a permanent basis. On 1 September 2019, he made his Superliga debut for Brøndby as a substitute in a 0–1 loss against FC Midtjylland. Mostly a substitute through the fall of the 2019–20 season, Mráz made two subsequent starts during regular forward Kamil Wilczek's two-match suspension. In the second fixture, a league match against Esbjerg fB, Mráz scored a brace to secure a 2–1 home win and thereby helped consolidate Brøndby's third position in the league table.

After Wilczek left in January 2020, Mráz made more appearances and scored his first goal of the new decade on 23 January in a 2–3 loss to AaB. On 30 June 2020, Mráz and teammate Simon Hedlund tested positive for SARS-CoV-2 during the COVID-19 pandemic, ruling them out for at least a week. He left the club at the end of the season with 23 appearances and five goals to his name, as his loan deal expired.

==== Loan to Zagłębie Lubin ====
On 13 August 2020, Mráz joined Polish Ekstraklasa club Zagłębie Lubin on a season-long loan with an option to buy. He made his debut as a starter on 21 August in 2–1 home win over Lech Poznań, before being substituted in the 67th minute for Rok Sirk. On 7 December, he scored his first goal for the club in a 1–1 home draw against Piast Gliwice.

=== Spezia ===
On 9 August 2021, after his loan at Zagłębie Lubin ended, Mráz signed permanently for Serie A club Spezia on a three-year contract. He made his debut on 13 August in a Coppa Italia match against Pordenone. On 23 August, he made his first league appearance, coming on in the 69th minute for Emmanuel Gyasi in a 2–2 draw against Cagliari.

==== Loans ====
On 2 September 2021, less than a month after joining Spezia, Mráz moved to Slovan Bratislava on a one-year loan with an option for a permanent transfer. Slovan signed him to add competition in attack ahead of the Europa Conference League group stage and domestic matches.

On 1 September 2022, Mráz joined Spanish club Mirandés on a season-long loan. He debuted two days later, replacing Roberto López in the 81st minute of a 3–0 league defeat to Villarreal B. The loan was terminated early on 24 January 2023.

On the same day as he left Mirandés, 24 January 2023, Mráz was loaned to Cypriot First Division club Anorthosis Famagusta. He made 19 league appearances for the club over the remainder of the season.

=== Volos ===
Mráz signed for Super League Greece club Volos on 7 July 2023, but the move was unsuccessful: he made three league appearances, totalling fewer than 160 minutes and no goals, and on 30 November the club announced that his contract had been terminated by mutual consent.

=== Motor Lublin ===
On 12 February 2024, Mráz returned to Poland with I liga club Motor Lublin, signing until the end of the season with an option for a further year. He scored six goals in 16 league matches as Motor won promotion through the 2023–24 I liga play-offs, taking the club back to the Ekstraklasa after 32 years, and the option on his contract was taken up on 6 June 2024.

He was the outstanding player of Motor's first season back in the top flight, scoring 16 goals and providing four assists in 34 league appearances, a total that made him the promoted club's leading scorer. Negotiations over a new contract failed, and he left on the expiry of his deal at the end of June 2025 having scored 22 goals in 50 matches for the club.

=== Servette ===
Mráz joined Swiss club Servette on a free transfer, announced on 28 May 2025, on a contract to 2027. Servette had finished as Swiss runners-up and entered the UEFA Champions League qualifying rounds, and he scored in that competition as well as appearing in the Europa League and Conference League during the season. He scored ten goals in 35 league appearances in 2025–26.

== International career ==
Mráz has played for every national team youth team from the U15 team through the U21 team.

Mráz was first called up to Slovakia's senior national team on 2 October 2018 by the coach Ján Kozák for matches against Czech Republic (a part of 2018–19 UEFA Nations League) and a friendly against Sweden later in October. However, Mráz was also an alternate for friendly games against the Netherlands, Morocco, Denmark and Slovakia's first UEFA Nations League match against Ukraine. Nonetheless Kozák faced questions from the press and criticism from the fans on social media for not calling Mráz up earlier in the year, especially for May/June fixture, as Mráz became the top scorer in the finishing Fortuna Liga season.

Mráz, however, did not debut under Kozák. Slovakia's most successful coach resigned on 14 October 2018 after a 1–2 derby match loss to Czech Republic. Nonetheless, he debuted on 16 October 2018 in a 1–1 draw in Solna against Sweden, in a game managed by caretaker manager Štefan Tarkovič, coming on as a substitute for Adam Nemec in the 71st minute.

== Career statistics ==
=== Club ===
As of match played 22 March 2026

Appearances and goals by club, season and competition
Club	Season	League			National cup (Note: Includes Slovak Cup, Danish Cup, Polish Cup, Coppa Italia, Copa del Rey, Cypriot Cup)		Europe		Other		Total	
Club	Season	Division	Apps	Goals	Apps	Goals	Apps	Goals	Apps	Goals	Apps	Goals
Senica	2013–14	Fortuna Liga	8	0	—		—		—		8	0
Senica	2014–15	Fortuna Liga	15	1	2	0	—		—		17	1
Senica	2015–16	Fortuna Liga	21	2	1	0	—		—		22	2
Senica	2016–17	Fortuna Liga	19	2	1	1	—		—		20	3
Senica	Total		63	5	4	1	—		—		67	6
Žilina	2016–17	Fortuna Liga	11	2	1	2	—		—		12	4
Žilina	2017–18	Fortuna Liga	34	21	5	0	1 (Note: Appearance in UEFA Champions League)	0	—		40	21
Žilina	Total		45	23	6	2	1	0	—		52	25
Empoli	2018–19	Serie A	6	1	0	0	—		—		6	1
Crotone (loan)	2018–19	Serie B	5	1	—		—		—		5	1
Brøndby (loan)	2019–20	Superliga	22	4	2	1	—		—		24	5
Zagłębie Lubin (loan)	2020–21	Ekstraklasa	27	2	2	1	—		—		29	3
Spezia	2021–22	Serie A	2	0	1	0	—		—		3	0
Slovan Bratislava (loan)	2021–22	Fortuna Liga	19	7	3	1	6 (Note: Appearances in UEFA Europa Conference League)	1	—		28	9
Mirandés (loan)	2022–23	Segunda División	11	0	2	0	—		—		13	0
Anorthosis (loan)	2022–23	Cypriot First Division	19	6	2	0	—		—		21	6
Volos	2023–24	Super League Greece	3	0	0	0	—		—		3	0
Motor Lublin	2023–24	I liga	14	6	—		—		2 (Note: Appearances in I liga promotion play-offs)	0	16	6
Motor Lublin	2024–25	Ekstraklasa	34	16	0	0	—		—		34	16
Motor Lublin	Total		48	22	0	0	—		2	0	50	22
Servette	2025–26	Swiss Super League	29	9	1	0	4 (Note: Two appearances in UEFA Champions League, two appearances and one goal in UEFA Conference League)	1	—		34	10
Career total			299	80	23	6	11	2	2	0	335	88

=== International ===
As of match played 31 March 2026

Appearances and goals by national team and year
National team	Year	Apps	Goals
Slovakia
Slovakia	2018	1	0
Slovakia	2019	2	1
Slovakia	2020	1	0
Slovakia	2022	2	0
Slovakia	2025	4	0
Slovakia	2026	2	0
Total		12	1

Scores and results list Slovakia's goal tally first, score column indicates score after each Mráz goal.''

List of international goals scored by Samuel Mráz
No.	Date	Venue	Opponent	Score	Result	Competition
1	7 June 2019	Štadión Antona Malatinského, Trnava, Slovakia	Jordan	4–1	5–1	Friendly

== Honours ==
Žilina

- Slovak First Football League: 2016–17

Slovan Bratislava

- Slovak First Football League: 2021–22

Individual

- Slovak First Football League Player of the Year: 2017–18
- Slovak First Football League top scorer: 2017–18
- Ekstraklasa Player of the Month: November 2024
