= AC Prato =

Association football club in Italy

- Full name: Associazione Calcio Prato S.p.A.
- Nicknames: Lanieri (Woolworkers), Biancazzurri (White-blues), Fiordalisi (Cornflowers)
- Founded: 1908; 118 years ago
- Ground: Stadio Lungobisenzio, Prato, Italy
- Capacity: 6,750
- Chairman: Asmaa Gacem
- Manager: Luca Saudati
- League: Serie D
- 2023–24: Serie D Group D, 7th
- Website: acprato.it
Home colours	Away colours	Third colours

Associazione Calcio Prato is an Italian association football club, based in Prato, Tuscany.

Prato currently plays in Serie D/E, having last been in Serie B in 1964.

== History ==
The club was founded in 1908.

In season 2010–11 the team played in Lega Pro Seconda Divisione ranking 3rd and was beaten from Carrarese in the final of the play-off, but it was later admitted to Lega Pro Prima Divisione to fill vacancies.

== Colors and badge ==
The team's colors are blue, white and gold (like the cornflower).

== Famous players and managers ==
Notable former players include Christian Vieri, Alessandro Diamanti (2nd place at Euro 2012), Vittorio Rossi (Paolo Rossi's father), Massimo Maccarone, Massimo Oddo (World Champion in 2006), Alessandro Matri, Paolo Cecconi & Carlo Cudicini. Notable former managers include Giovanni Ferrari (World Champion in 1934 & 1938), Ferruccio Valcareggi & Enzo Bearzot (World Champion in 1982).

== Current squad ==
As of 30 December 2025

Note: Flags indicate national team as defined under FIFA eligibility rules; some limited exceptions apply. Players may hold more than one non-FIFA nationality.

No.	Pos.	Nation	Player
1	GK	ITA	Gian Marco Fantoni
12	GK	ITA	Gabriel Furghieri
4	DF	ITA	Giacomo Risaliti
9	FW	ITA	Bryan Gioè
16	DF	ITA	Lorenzo Polvani
13	DF	ITA	Mattia Drappelli
15	DF	ITA	Filippo Boccardi
11	LB	ITA	Luca Zanon
2	RB	ITA	Riccardo Iacoponi
24	RB	ITA	Roberto Berizzi
14	MF	ITA	Yusuf Cela
30	MF	ITA	Jacopo Azteni

No.	Pos.	Nation	Player
8	MF	ITA	Andrea Settembrini
18	MF	ITA	Francesco d'Orsi
21	MF	ITA	Isaia Lattarullo
6	MF	ITA	Gabriele Colzi
20	DF	ITA	Alessio Sarpa
7	LW	ITA	Francesco Limberti
25	CAM	ITA	Manuel Cesari
10	CAM	ITA	Damiano Rinaldini
23	CAM	ITA	Nicola Andreoli
28	FW	ITA	Simone Rossetti
19	MF	ITA	Francesco Verde

=== Out on loan ===
Note: Flags indicate national team as defined under FIFA eligibility rules; some limited exceptions apply. Players may hold more than one non-FIFA nationality.

No.	Pos.	Nation	Player

== Honours ==
=== League ===
- Serie C
  - Winners: 1940–41 (group E), 1945–46 (group A), 1948–49 (group C), 1956–57, 1959–60 (group B), 1962–63 (group B)
- Serie C2
  - Winners: 1979–80 (group A), 1982–83 (group A), 2001–02 (group A)
- Serie D
  - Winners: 1953–54 (group E), 1976–77 (group E)

=== Cups ===
- Coppa Italia Serie C
  - Winners: 2000–01
