= Fabio Foglia =

Italian footballer, midfielder

Personal information
- Date of birth: 5 June 1989 (age 37)
- Place of birth: Giulianova, Italy
- Height: 1.72 m (5 ft 8 in)
- Position: Midfielder

Youth career
- 2007–2008: Pescara
- 2008–2012: Piacenza

Senior career*
Years	Team	Apps	(Gls)
2008–2012	Piacenza	30	(4)
2010–2011	→ Sangiovannese (loan)	28	(3)
2012–2013	Teramo	28	(5)
2013–2015	Torres	54	(2)
2015–2016	Maceratese	33	(6)
2016–2021	Arezzo	146	(10)
2021	→ Lecco (loan)	14	(0)
2021–2022	Viterbese	14	(0)
2022	Pontedera	15	(1)
2022–2024	Arezzo	45	(0)
- * Club domestic league appearances and goals

Fabio Foglia (born 5 June 1989) is an Italian former footballer who played as a midfielder.

== Club career ==
Foglia made his fourth-tier debut at Sangiovannese, where he played on loan from Piacenza. He made his professional, Lega Pro debut in the latter team in the first round of 2011–12 Lega Pro, on 4 September 2011 against Südtirol, playing 88 minutes, he scored the winner goal in the 71st minute. He played in fourth-tier Teramo and Torres, spent a year in Maceratese, before he signed to Arezzo in 2016.

On 7 January 2021, he joined Lecco on loan.

On 26 August 2021, he signed with Viterbese for a term of one year with an option to extend. On 29 January 2022, he moved to Pontedera.

On 29 November 2022, Foglia returned to Arezzo.

On 5 July 2023, he extended his contract with the club. On 18 July 2024, Foglia announced his retirement from playing, moving to the position of the co-director of the youth sector with Arezzo.
