= 1957–58 Serie B =

Italian football league season

Serie B
- Season: 1957–58
- Champions: Triestina; 1st title

Serie B 1957-58 team distribution

The Serie B 1957–58 was the twenty-sixth tournament of this competition played in Italy since its creation.

== Teams ==
Prato and Lecco had been promoted from Serie C, while Triestina and Palermo had been relegated from Serie A.

== Events ==
Relegations were cancelled in March by new Football League’s chairman Giuseppe Pasquale in order to expand the number of participants from 18 to 20. Moreover, Bari, the second ranked team, had to play a qualification match with Verona, that ranked 17th in 1957–58 Serie A.

== Final classification ==
| Pos | Team | Pld | W | D | L | GF | GA | GR | Pts | Promotion |
|---|---|---|---|---|---|---|---|---|---|---|
| 1 | Triestina (P) | 34 | 20 | 7 | 7 | 64 | 29 | 2.207 | 47 | Promotion to Serie A |
| 2 | Bari (P) | 34 | 17 | 11 | 6 | 47 | 28 | 1.679 | 45 | Promotion play-offs |
| 3 | Venezia | 34 | 16 | 9 | 9 | 42 | 30 | 1.400 | 41 | |
| 4 | Marzotto | 34 | 16 | 7 | 11 | 50 | 40 | 1.250 | 39 | |
| 4 | Simmenthal-Monza | 34 | 15 | 9 | 10 | 47 | 39 | 1.205 | 39 | |
| 6 | Palermo | 34 | 12 | 13 | 9 | 36 | 35 | 1.029 | 37 | |
| 7 | Zenit Modena | 34 | 11 | 14 | 9 | 50 | 46 | 1.087 | 36 | |
| 8 | Brescia | 34 | 14 | 7 | 13 | 45 | 36 | 1.250 | 35 | |
| 8 | Como | 34 | 11 | 13 | 10 | 30 | 23 | 1.304 | 35 | |
| 10 | Prato | 34 | 12 | 10 | 12 | 34 | 40 | 0.850 | 34 | |
| 11 | Novara | 34 | 9 | 12 | 13 | 42 | 39 | 1.077 | 30 | |
| 11 | Taranto | 34 | 10 | 10 | 14 | 25 | 31 | 0.806 | 30 | |
| 11 | Catania | 34 | 8 | 14 | 12 | 29 | 36 | 0.806 | 30 | |
| 14 | Lecco | 34 | 8 | 13 | 13 | 28 | 44 | 0.636 | 29 | |
| 15 | Sambenedettese | 34 | 8 | 12 | 14 | 25 | 44 | 0.568 | 28 | |
| 16 | Messina | 34 | 8 | 11 | 15 | 23 | 40 | 0.575 | 27 | |
| 17 | Cagliari | 34 | 8 | 10 | 16 | 31 | 44 | 0.705 | 26 | |
| 18 | Parma | 34 | 5 | 14 | 15 | 25 | 49 | 0.510 | 24 | |

Source: Panini
(P) Promoted

== Results ==
| Home \ Away | BAR | BRE | CAG | CTN | COM | LCO | MAR | MES | NOV | PAL | PAR | PRA | SBN | SMN | TAR | TRI | VEN | ZMO |
|---|---|---|---|---|---|---|---|---|---|---|---|---|---|---|---|---|---|---|
| Bari | | 1–1 | 1–1 | 0–0 | 1–0 | 1–0 | 2–0 | 0–0 | 3–0 | 2–1 | 1–0 | 3–0 | 1–0 | 1–0 | 2–1 | 1–2 | 0–2 | 0–0 |
| Brescia | 1–3 | | 5–0 | 1–0 | 1–1 | 0–1 | 1–0 | 2–1 | 1–0 | 3–0 | 3–1 | 0–1 | 4–0 | 2–3 | 0–1 | 2–0 | 1–1 | 4–1 |
| Cagliari | 1–2 | 4–0 | | 2–2 | 1–0 | 2–1 | 2–0 | 5–0 | 1–1 | 1–0 | 2–0 | 1–1 | 2–2 | 0–2 | 0–0 | 1–3 | 0–1 | 0–0 |
| Catania | 2–0 | 0–2 | 2–0 | | 0–0 | 3–1 | 2–1 | 1–0 | 0–0 | 0–0 | 2–2 | 1–0 | 0–0 | 0–1 | 2–0 | 0–0 | 1–1 | 2–2 |
| Como | 2–1 | 1–0 | 0–1 | 3–1 | | 1–1 | 3–0 | 2–0 | 3–0 | 0–0 | 2–0 | 3–1 | 1–1 | 0–1 | 1–0 | 2–0 | 0–2 | 0–0 |
| Lecco | 0–3 | 0–4 | 1–0 | 1–1 | 0–0 | | 1–1 | 1–0 | 0–0 | 2–1 | 1–1 | 1–0 | 0–0 | 1–0 | 2–0 | 1–1 | 0–0 | 5–2 |
| Marzotto | 1–1 | 4–1 | 3–0 | 2–1 | 1–0 | 3–1 | | 4–0 | 2–1 | 1–0 | 1–0 | 1–1 | 6–0 | 3–2 | 2–1 | 2–0 | 3–4 | 1–0 |
| Messina | 0–3 | 0–1 | 3–0 | 0–2 | 2–1 | 2–1 | 0–1 | | 2–1 | 0–0 | 0–0 | 1–0 | 1–0 | 1–1 | 0–0 | 0–2 | 2–0 | 0–2 |
| Novara | 1–1 | 1–1 | 1–0 | 3–0 | 0–0 | 4–2 | 3–0 | 1–1 | | 5–2 | 5–0 | 2–0 | 1–1 | 0–1 | 0–1 | 0–1 | 0–1 | 2–2 |
| Palermo | 3–0 | 2–0 | 3–1 | 1–1 | 0–0 | 0–0 | 2–2 | 1–1 | 3–1 | | 1–1 | 1–0 | 0–0 | 1–0 | 2–0 | 3–2 | 0–0 | 1–0 |
| Parma | 1–1 | 2–1 | 1–1 | 0–0 | 1–1 | 1–1 | 3–0 | 0–0 | 0–2 | 0–2 | | 0–3 | 0–0 | 1–1 | 1–0 | 2–1 | 1–0 | 2–2 |
| Prato | 0–3 | 2–0 | 1–0 | 1–0 | 0–0 | 3–0 | 2–1 | 0–0 | 3–3 | 1–0 | 1–0 | | 1–0 | 3–2 | 0–0 | 3–0 | 0–0 | 2–2 |
| Sambenedettese | 2–3 | 0–0 | 1–0 | 2–0 | 0–2 | 2–1 | 2–0 | 2–1 | 0–0 | 0–0 | 3–0 | 0–0 | | 1–1 | 1–0 | 1–5 | 0–1 | 2–1 |
| Simm.-Monza | 2–2 | 1–1 | 1–0 | 2–0 | 2–1 | 3–0 | 1–1 | 0–0 | 1–0 | 3–1 | 2–1 | 1–0 | 4–0 | | 1–1 | 0–1 | 2–0 | 3–7 |
| Taranto | 1–1 | 2–0 | 0–0 | 1–0 | 0–0 | 1–1 | 0–1 | 1–2 | 2–0 | 1–1 | 2–0 | 2–1 | 1–0 | 3–1 | | 0–1 | 0–0 | 3–2 |
| Triestina | 0–0 | 0–0 | 3–1 | 4–1 | 3–0 | 2–0 | 1–0 | 0–0 | 0–0 | 5–0 | 4–1 | 6–1 | 2–0 | 4–1 | 3–0 | | 3–1 | 2–0 |
| Venezia | 0–1 | 1–2 | 3–1 | 1–0 | 0–0 | 2–0 | 1–1 | 3–2 | 3–1 | 1–2 | 1–0 | 4–0 | 3–2 | 1–0 | 2–0 | 2–2 | | 0–1 |
| Zenit Modena | 3–2 | 1–0 | 0–0 | 2–2 | 2–0 | 0–0 | 1–1 | 2–1 | 1–3 | 1–2 | 2–2 | 2–2 | 2–0 | 1–1 | 1–0 | 3–1 | 2–0 | |

Source: Almanacco Illustrato del Calcio - La Storia 1898-2004, Panini Edizioni, Modena, September 2005 (in Italian)
Legend: Blue = home team win; Yellow = draw; Red = away team win.

== Serie A qualification play-off ==
Bari had to play a qualification match against the team that ranked 17th in Serie A.

| Team 1 | Agg. | Team 2 | 1st leg | 2nd leg |
|---|---|---|---|---|
| Bari (Italy) | 3-0 | (Italy) Verona | 1-0 | 2-0 |

Bari promoted to Serie A.

== References and sources ==
- Almanacco Illustrato del Calcio - La Storia 1898-2004, Panini Edizioni, Modena, September 2005
