= Andrea Settembrini =

Italian footballer (born 1991)

Personal information
- Date of birth: 10 December 1991 (age 34)
- Place of birth: Arezzo, Italy
- Height: 1.76 m (5 ft 9 in)
- Position: Midfielder

Team information
- Current team: Sansovino

Senior career*
Years	Team	Apps	(Gls)
2008–2010	Sansovino	30	(1)
2010–2011	Pianese	21	(0)
2011–2013	Poggibonsi	59	(1)
2013–2015	Pontedera	63	(3)
2015–2017	Feralpisalò	66	(4)
2017–2019	Cittadella	65	(0)
2019–2021	Entella	44	(0)
2021–2022	Padova	18	(0)
2022–2025	Arezzo	82	(3)
2025–2026	Prato	2	(0)
2026–	Sansovino		

International career
2013	Italy B	1	(0)
- * Club domestic league appearances and goals as of 4 January 2026

Andrea Settembrini (born 10 December 1991) is an Italian professional footballer who plays as a midfielder for Eccellenza club Sansovino.

== Club career ==
After two successful seasons at Pontedera, Settembrini signed a two-year contract with Lega Pro club Feralpisalò in July 2015.

On 26 July 2019, he signed with Entella.

On 22 July 2021, he joined Serie C club Padova.

On 27 June 2022, Settembrini moved to Arezzo in Serie D.

== International career ==
Settembrini represented Italy at the 2013 Summer Universiade. He received a red card in their opening fixture against Malaysia on 5 July and was forced to sit out their match against Great Britain three days later.

== Personal life ==
He lives in the small town of Desenzano del Garda on the southwestern shore of Lake Garda in northern Italy. In September 2016, Settembrini graduated from the University of Perugia with a degree in sports medicine.
