= Lorenzo Polvani =

Italian footballer

Personal information
- Date of birth: 26 July 1994 (age 32)
- Place of birth: Pistoia, Italy
- Height: 1.88 m (6 ft 2 in)
- Position: Centre back

Team information
- Current team: Prato

Senior career*
Years	Team	Apps	(Gls)
2011–2012	Pistoiese	3	(0)
2012–2014	Fortis Juventus	61	(1)
2014–2017	Pontedera	61	(1)
2017	SPAL	0	(0)
2017–2020	Empoli	7	(0)
2020	Pianese	0	(0)
2020–2021	San Donato	19	(1)
2021–2022	Ravenna	30	(1)
2022–2024	Arezzo	41	(0)
2024–2025	Pistoiese	31	(1)
2025–	Prato	15	(2)
- * Club domestic league appearances and goals as of 1 March 2026

Lorenzo Polvani (born 26 July 1994) is an Italian professional footballer who plays as a defender for Serie D club Prato.

== Club career ==
Polvani made his Serie C debut for Pontedera on 31 August 2014 in a game against SPAL.

On 31 January 2020, he signed with Pianese. After making no appearances for Pianese, Polvani left the club on 23 October 2020 to join Serie D club San Donato.

On 7 August 2021 he joined Ravenna, newly relegated to Serie D.

On 15 June 2022 he joined Arezzo. On 25 May 2023 he extended his contract for the club until 2025.
