= 2019–20 Coppa Italia =

Tournament details
- Country: Italy
- Dates: 3 August 2019 – 17 June 2020
- Teams: 78

Final positions
- Champions: Napoli (6th title)
- Runners-up: Juventus

Tournament statistics
- Matches played: 79
- Goals scored: 254 (3.22 per match)
- Top goal scorer(s): Gianluca Scamacca; Michele Vano (4 goals each)

The 2019–20 Coppa Italia (branded as the Coppa Italia Coca-Cola for sponsorship reasons during the final) was the 73rd edition of the national cup in Italian football.

Lazio were the defending champions having won their seventh cup title in May 2019 against Atalanta, but were eliminated by Napoli in the quarter-finals. Due to the COVID-19 pandemic in Italy, both the second legs of the semi-finals and the final itself were postponed to June.

Napoli won the competition by defeating Juventus 4–2 on penalties in the final after a goalless draw, winning their sixth cup title, having won their fifth cup title in 2014.

== Participating teams ==
Locations and phase of entrance of the 2019–20 Coppa Italia teams:
First round; Second round; Third round; Final phase.

=== Serie A (20 teams) ===
- Atalanta (round of 16)
- Bologna
- Brescia
- Cagliari
- Fiorentina
- Genoa
- Hellas Verona
- Internazionale (round of 16)
- Juventus (round of 16)
- Lazio (round of 16)
- Lecce
- Milan (round of 16)
- Napoli (round of 16)
- Parma
- Roma (round of 16)
- Sampdoria
- Sassuolo
- SPAL
- Torino (round of 16)
- Udinese

=== Serie B (20 teams) ===
- Ascoli
- Benevento
- Chievo
- Cittadella
- Cosenza
- Cremonese
- Crotone
- Empoli
- Frosinone
- Juve Stabia
- Livorno
- Perugia
- Pescara
- Pisa
- Pordenone
- Salernitana
- Spezia
- Trapani
- Venezia
- Virtus Entella

=== Serie C (29 teams) ===
- Alessandria
- Arezzo
- Carpi (second round)
- Carrarese
- Casertana
- Catania
- Catanzaro
- Cavese
- FeralpiSalò
- Fermana
- Francavilla
- Imolese
- Monopoli
- Monza
- Novara
- Padova (second round)
- Piacenza
- Potenza
- Pro Patria
- Pro Vercelli
- Ravenna
- Reggina
- Rende
- Sambenedettese
- Siena
- Südtirol
- Triestina
- Vicenza
- Viterbese Castrense

=== Serie D (9 teams) ===
- Adriese
- Fanfulla
- Fasano
- Lanusei
- Mantova
- Matelica
- Ponsacco
- Sanremese
- Turris

== Format and seeding ==
Teams entered the competition at various stages, as follows:

- First phase (one-legged fixtures)
  - First round: 27 teams from Serie C and the nine Serie D teams started the tournament
  - Second round: the eighteen winners from the previous round were joined by the twenty Serie B teams and two teams from Serie C
  - Third round: the twenty winners from the second round met the twelve Serie A sides seeded 9–20
  - Fourth round: the sixteen winners faced each other
- Second phase
  - Round of 16 (one-legged): the eight fourth round winners were inserted into a bracket with the Serie A clubs seeded 1–8
  - Quarter-finals (one-legged)
  - Semi-finals (two-legged)
- Final (one-legged)

== Round dates ==
The schedule of each round was announced by the organization in July 2019, but then modified in March 2020 as follows:

| Phase | Round | First leg | Second leg |
|---|---|---|---|
| First stage | First round | 3 August 2019 | |
| First stage | Second round | 10 August 2019 | |
| First stage | Third round | 18 August 2019 | |
| First stage | Fourth round | 3 December 2019 | |
| Final stage | Round of 16 | 9–16 January 2020 | |
| Final stage | Quarter-finals | 21–29 January 2020 | |
| Final stage | Semi-finals | 12–13 February 2020 | 12–13 June 2020 |
| Final stage | Final | 17 June 2020 | |

== First stage ==
=== First round ===
A total of 36 teams from Serie C and Serie D competed in this round, eighteen of which advanced to the second round.

| 3 August 2019 | Virtus Francavilla (3) | 2–1 | Novara (3) | Francavilla Fontana |
| 17:30 CEST (UTC+2) | Vázquez 9'; Nunzella 78' | Report | Bellich 20'; Peralta (red card) 86' | Stadium: Stadio Giovanni Paolo II; Referee: Mattia Pascarella |

| 3 August 2019 | Pro Vercelli (3) | 2–0 (a.e.t.) | Rende (3) | Vercelli |
| 18:30 CEST (UTC+2) | Victor Volpe 110'; Paulo 114' | Report | Loviso (red card) 111' | Stadium: Stadio Silvio Piola; Attendance: 504; Referee: Paride Tremolada |

| 4 August 2019 | Südtirol (3) | 4–2 | Fasano (4) | Bolzano |
| 16:00 CEST (UTC+2) | Morosini 9'; Romero 54'; Ierardi 74'; Mazzocchi 89' | Report | Corvino 63', 83' | Stadium: Stadio Druso; Referee: Sajmir Kumara |

| 4 August 2019 | Adriese (4) | 0–1 | Feralpisalò (3) | Adria |
| 17:30 CEST (UTC+2) | | Report | Scarsella 53' | Stadium: Stadio Luigi Bettinazzi; Referee: Giuseppe Emanuele Repace |

| 4 August 2019 | Carrarese (3) | 1–1 (5–4 p) | Fermana (3) | Carrara |
| 17:30 CEST (UTC+2) | Valente 63' | Report | Cognigni 24' (pen.) | Stadium: Stadio dei Marmi; Attendance: 837; Referee: Francesco Luciani |
| | Penalties |
| | Bentivegna (penalty missed); Valente (penalty scored); Biasci (penalty scored); Pasciuti (penalty scored); Murolo (penalty scored); Cardoselli (penalty scored) | | (penalty scored) Cognigni; (penalty missed) Ricciardi; (penalty scored) Zerbo; (penalty scored) Isacco; (penalty scored) Liguori; (penalty missed) Manetta |

| 4 August 2019 | Ravenna (3) | 1–0 | Sanremese (4) | Ravenna |
| 17:30 CEST (UTC+2) | Raffini 8' | Report | | Stadium: Stadio Bruno Benelli |

| 4 August 2019 | Piacenza (3) | 1–1 (3–2 p) | Viterbese (3) | Piacenza |
| 18:00 CEST (UTC+2) | Sylla 97' | Report | Svidercoschi 94' | Stadium: Stadio Leonardo Garilli; Attendance: 759; Referee: Enrico Maggio |
| | Penalties |
| | Bolis (penalty scored); Paponi (penalty missed); Giandonato (penalty scored); Cattaneo (penalty missed); Marotta (penalty scored) | | (penalty missed) Vandeputte; (penalty missed) Antezza; (penalty scored) Svidercoschi; (penalty scored) Markić; (penalty missed) Ricci |

| 4 August 2019 | Monza (3) | 2–0 | Alessandria (3) | Monza |
| 18:30 CEST (UTC+2) | Iocolano 6'; Brighenti 33' | Report | | Stadium: Stadio Brianteo |

| 4 August 2019 | Pro Patria (3) | 1–0 | Matelica (4) | Busto Arsizio |
| 18:30 CEST (UTC+2) | Defendi 72'; Colombo (yellow card) 31' (yellow-red card) 81' | Report | | Stadium: Stadio Carlo Speroni |

| 4 August 2019 | Catanzaro (3) | 4–1 (a.e.t.) | Casertana (3) | Catanzaro |
| 19:00 CEST (UTC+2) | Calì 48'; Nicastro 94', 109'; Kanoute 103' | Report | Cavallini 84' | Stadium: Stadio Nicola Ceravolo |

| 4 August 2019 | Triestina (3) | 3–1 | Cavese (3) | Trieste |
| 20:00 CEST (UTC+2) | Granoche 8', 17' (pen.); Ferretti 86' | Report | El Ouazni 43' | Stadium: Stadio Nereo Rocco |

| 4 August 2019 | Catania (3) | 3–0 | Fanfulla (4) | Catania |
| 20:30 CEST (UTC+2) | Di Piazza 13'; Sarno 42'; Curiale 79' | Report | | Stadium: Stadio Angelo Massimino |

| 4 August 2019 | Imolese (3) | 3–3 (4–3 p) | Sambenedettese (3) | Imola |
| 20:30 CEST (UTC+2) | Tentoni 51'; Padovan 59'; Latte Lath 102' | Report | Cernigoi 26', 113' (pen.); Rapisarda 64' | Stadium: Stadio Romeo Galli; Attendance: 584; Referee: Alessandro Di Graci |
| | Penalties |
| | Boccardi (penalty scored); Marcucci (penalty missed); D'Alena (penalty scored); Latte Lath (penalty scored); Valeau (penalty scored) | | (penalty scored) Cernigoi; (penalty missed) Brunetti; (penalty missed) Miceli; (penalty scored) Orlando; (penalty scored) Rapisarda |

| 4 August 2019 | Monopoli (3) | 4–1 | Ponsacco (4) | Monopoli |
| 20:30 CEST (UTC+2) | De Franco 3'; Donnarumma 8', 35'; Cuppone 77' | Report | Olawale 20' | Stadium: Stadio Vito Simone Veneziani |

| 4 August 2019 | Siena (3) | 0–2 | Mantova (4) | Siena |
| 20:30 CEST (UTC+2) | | Report | Scotto 40' (pen.); Guccione 55' | Stadium: Stadio Artemio Franchi – Montepaschi Arena |

| 4 August 2019 | Arezzo (3) | 1–0 | Turris (4) | Arezzo |
| 20:45 CEST (UTC+2) | Belloni 56' | Report | | Stadium: Stadio Città di Arezzo |

| 4 August 2019 | Potenza (3) | 2–0 | Lanusei (4) | Potenza |
| 21:00 CEST (UTC+2) | Longo 60'; Ferri Marini 81' | Report | | Stadium: Stadio Alfredo Viviani |

| 6 August 2019 | Reggina (3) | 3–2 | Vicenza (3) | Reggio Calabria |
| 20:30 CEST (UTC+2) | Sounas 35'; Reginaldo 54' (pen.), 72' | Report | Marotta 7'; Giacomelli 77' (pen.) | Stadium: Stadio Oreste Granillo |

=== Second round ===
A total of forty teams from the first round and Serie B competed in the second round, twenty of which advanced to join twelve teams from Serie A in the third round.

| 10 August 2019 | Ascoli (2) | 5–1 | Pro Vercelli (3) | Ascoli Piceno |
| 18:30 CEST (UTC+2) | Brosco 7'; Da Cruz 20'; Ardemagni 54' (pen.); Scamacca 72', 87' | Report | Azzi 33' | Stadium: Stadio Cino e Lillo Del Duca; Referee: Giovanni Ayroldi |

| 11 August 2019 | Spezia (2) | 5–0 | Pro Patria (3) | La Spezia |
| 18:00 CEST (UTC+2) | Gyasi 15'; Guðjohnsen 25'; F. Ricci 53'; M. Ricci 64'; Burgzorg 90+2' | | | Stadium: Stadio Alberto Picco |

| 11 August 2019 | Perugia (2) | 1–0 | Triestina (3) | Perugia |
| CEST (UTC+2) | Sgarbi 28' | | | Stadium: Stadio Renato Curi |

| 11 August 2019 | Cremonese (2) | 4–0 | Virtus Francavilla (3) | Cremona |
| CEST (UTC+2) | Claiton 41'; Deli 44'; Palombi 58', 66' | | | Stadium: Stadio Giovanni Zini |

| 11 August 2019 | Empoli (2) | 2–1 | Reggina (3) | Empoli |
| CEST (UTC+2) | Mancuso 22'; Antonelli 72' | | Corazza 28' | Stadium: Stadio Carlo Castellani |

| 11 August 2019 | Pescara (2) | 3–2 | Mantova (4) | Pescara |
| CEST (UTC+2) | Tumminello 13' (pen.); Di Grazia 79'; Ventola | | Guccione 50'; Tremolada 90' | Stadium: Stadio Adriatico – Giovanni Cornacchia |

| 11 August 2019 | Benevento (2) | 3–4 | Monza (3) | Benevento |
| CEST (UTC+2) | Tello 51', 83'; Viola 90+4' (pen.) | | Bellusci 4'; Finotto 17', 88'; Iocolano 49' | Stadium: Stadio Ciro Vigorito |

| 11 August 2019 | Livorno (2) | 0–1 | Carpi (3) | Livorno |
| CEST (UTC+2) | | | Vano 69' | Stadium: Stadio Armando Picchi |

| 11 August 2019 | Cittadella (2) | 3–0 | Padova (3) | Cittadella |
| CEST (UTC+2) | Iori 23' (pen.); Diaw 26'; Celar 87' | | | Stadium: Stadio Pier Cesare Tombolato |

| 11 August 2019 | Chievo (2) | 1–1 (a.e.t.) (3–1 p) | Ravenna (3) | Verona |
| CEST (UTC+2) | Meggiorini 23' | | Raffini 62' | Stadium: Stadio Marc'Antonio Bentegodi |
| | Penalties |
| | Karamoko (penalty scored); Leverbe (penalty scored); Esposito (penalty missed); Rodríguez (penalty scored) | | (penalty scored) Ronchi; (penalty missed) Ricchi; (penalty missed) Pellizzari; (penalty missed) Fyda |

| 11 August 2019 | Crotone (2) | 4–3 | Arezzo (3) | Crotone |
| CEST (UTC+2) | Barberis 2'; Simy 7'; Golemić 33'; Ruggiero 75' | | Borghini 10'; Belloni 17' (pen.); Zini | Stadium: Stadio Ezio Scida |

| 11 August 2019 | Pordenone (2) | 1–2 | Feralpisalò (3) | Pordenone |
| CEST (UTC+2) | Pobega 44' | | Ceccarelli 30'; Scarsella 50' | Stadium: Stadio Ottavio Bottecchia |

| 11 August 2019 | Juve Stabia (2) | 1–1 (a.e.t.) (2–3 p) | Imolese (3) | Castellammare di Stabia |
| 19:45 CEST (UTC+2) | Carlini 60' (pen.) | | Vuthaj 66' | Stadium: Stadio Romeo Menti; Attendance: 3,000; Referee: Federico Dionisi |
| | Penalties |
| | Di Gennaro (penalty scored); Carlini (penalty missed); Torromino (penalty missed); Canotto (penalty scored); Calò (penalty missed) | | (penalty scored) Boccardi; (penalty scored) Latte Lath; (penalty missed) Vuthaj; (penalty missed) Marcucci; (penalty scored) Maniero |

| 11 August 2019 | Trapani (2) | 3–1 | Piacenza (3) | Trapani |
| CEST (UTC+2) | Evacuo 44', 59'; Nzola 82' | | Cacia 12' | Stadium: Stadio Polisportivo Provinciale |

| 11 August 2019 | Venezia (2) | 2–1 | Catania (3) | Venice |
| 19:00 CEST (UTC+2) | Aramu 3'; Zuculini 56' | | Silvestri 41' | Stadium: Stadio Pier Luigi Penzo |

| 11 August 2019 | Frosinone (2) | 4–0 | Carrarese (3) | Frosinone |
| 20:30 CEST (UTC+2) | Cian0 10'; Paganini 43'; Ariaudo 49'; Tribuzzi 81' | | | Stadium: Stadio Benito Stirpe |

| 11 August 2019 | Monopoli (3) | 1–0 | Cosenza (2) | Monopoli |
| 20:30 CEST (UTC+2) | Mendicino 89' (pen.) | | | Stadium: Stadio Vito Simone Veneziani |

| 11 August 2019 | Virtus Entella (2) | 1–2 | Südtirol (3) | Chiavari |
| 20:30 CEST (UTC+2) | Paolucci 26' | | Casiraghi 8'; Morosini 84' | Stadium: Stadio Comunale |

| 11 August 2019 | Pisa (2) | 3–0 | Potenza (3) | Pisa |
| 20:45 CEST (UTC+2) | Marconi 43'; Masucci 53'; Aya 71' | | | Stadium: Arena Garibaldi – Stadio Romeo Anconetani |

| 11 August 2019 | Salernitana (2) | 3–1 | Catanzaro (3) | Salerno |
| 20:45 CEST (UTC+2) | Kiyine 22' (pen.); Giannetti 45', 73' | | Mangni 79' | Stadium: Stadio Arechi |

=== Third round ===
A total of 32 teams from the second round and Serie A (clubs seeded 9–20) competed in the third round, sixteen of which advanced to the fourth round.

| 16 August 2019 | Genoa (1) | 4–1 | Imolese (3) | Chiavari |
| 20:30 CEST (UTC+2) | Criscito 2' (pen.); Saponara 24'; Ghiglione 28'; Schöne 74' | Report | Alimi 53' | Stadium: Stadio Comunale di Chiavari; Attendance: 5,500; Referee: Luca Pairetto |

| 17 August 2019 | Parma (1) | 3–1 | Venezia (2) | Parma |
| 18:00 CEST (UTC+2) | Gervinho 10', 72'; Iacoponi 22' | Report | Aramu 24' (pen.) | Stadium: Stadio Ennio Tardini; Attendance: 5,449; Referee: Paolo Valeri |

| 18 August 2019 | Perugia (2) | 2–1 (a.e.t.) | Brescia (1) | Perugia |
| 18:00 CEST (UTC+2) | Melchiorri 90+3'; Buonaiuto 98' | | Donnarumma 43' | Stadium: Stadio Renato Curi; Attendance: 4,478; Referee: Marco Piccinini |

| 18 August 2019 | Fiorentina (1) | 3–1 | Monza (3) | Florence |
| 18:15 CEST (UTC+2) | Vlahović 80', 86'; Chiesa 89' | Report | Brighenti 34' | Stadium: Stadio Artemio Franchi; Attendance: 15,000; Referee: Fabrizio Pasqua |

| 18 August 2019 | Sassuolo (1) | 1–0 | Spezia (2) | Reggio Emilia |
| 20:45 CEST (UTC+2) | Traorè 9' | Report | | Stadium: Mapei Stadium – Città del Tricolore; Attendance: 2,930; Referee: Rosario Abisso |

| 18 August 2019 | Hellas Verona (1) | 1–2 (a.e.t.) | Cremonese (2) | Verona |
| 20:30 CEST (UTC+2) | Empereur 7' | Report | Castagnetti 90+3'; Deli 102' | Stadium: Stadio Marc'Antonio Bentegodi; Attendance: 8,211; Referee: Gianluca Manganiello |

| 18 August 2019 | Empoli (2) | 2–1 (a.e.t.) | Pescara (2) | Empoli |
| 20:30 CEST (UTC+2) | Dezi 27'; Moreo 103' | Report | Tumminello 6' | Stadium: Stadio Carlo Castellani; Attendance: 2,170; Referee: Maurizio Mariani |

| 18 August 2019 | Cittadella (2) | 3–3 (a.e.t.) (5–4 p) | Carpi (3) | Cittadella |
| CEST (UTC+2) | Diaw 25' (pen.); Celar 71'; Proia 103' | Report | Vano 43' (pen.), 90+1', 94' | Stadium: Stadio Pier Cesare Tombolato; Referee: Manuel Volpi |

| 18 August 2019 | Cagliari (1) | 2–1 | Chievo (2) | Cagliari |
| 20:30 CEST (UTC+2) | João Pedro 7'; Rog 17' | Report | Pucciarelli 43' | Stadium: Sardegna Arena; Attendance: 12,007; Referee: Antonio Giua |

| 18 August 2019 | Crotone (2) | 1–3 | Sampdoria (1) | Crotone |
| CEST (UTC+2) | Molina 8' | | Caprari 37'; Quagliarella 42' (pen.); Maroni 60' | Stadium: Stadio Ezio Scida; Attendance: 8,068; Referee: Juan Luca Sacchi |

| 18 August 2019 | SPAL (1) | 3–1 | Feralpisalò (3) | Ferrara |
| 20:45 CEST (UTC+2) | Di Francesco 3'; Valoti 16', 32' | | Maiorino 1' | Stadium: Stadio Paolo Mazza; Attendance: 5,374; Referee: Daniele Chiffi |

| 18 August 2019 | Lecce (1) | 4–0 | Salernitana (2) | Lecce |
| 20:45 CEST (UTC+2) | Lapadula 4', 76'; Falco 61'; Majer 81' | Report | | Stadium: Stadio Via del Mare; Attendance: 15,956; Referee: Eugenio Abbattista |

| 18 August 2019 | Ascoli (2) | 2–0 | Trapani (2) | Ascoli Piceno |
| 20:30 CEST (UTC+2) | Scamacca 48', 80' | Report | | Stadium: Stadio Cino e Lillo Del Duca; Attendance: 4,248; Referee: Gianpaolo Calvarese |

| 18 August 2019 | Frosinone (2) | 5–1 | Monopoli (3) | Frosinone |
| 20:30 CEST (UTC+2) | Trotta 31', 36'; Ciano 57'; Citro 67'; Brighenti 75' | Report | Ferrara 82' | Stadium: Stadio Benito Stirpe; Attendance: 4,109; Referee: Fabio Maresca |

| 18 August 2019 | Udinese (1) | 3–1 | Südtirol (3) | Udine |
| 20:30 CEST (UTC+2) | Lasagna 49'; Mandragora 70', 88' | | Morosini 66' | Stadium: Dacia Arena; Attendance: 5,252; Referee: Gianluca Aureliano |

| 18 August 2019 | Pisa (2) | 0–3 | Bologna (1) | Pisa |
| 20:45 CEST (UTC+2) | | | Poli 21'; Orsolini 61'; Palacio 64' | Stadium: Arena Garibaldi; Attendance: 7,141; Referee: Federico La Penna |

=== Fourth round ===
A total of sixteen teams from the third round competed in the fourth round, eight of which advanced to the round of 16.

| 3 December 2019 | Cremonese (2) | 1–0 | Empoli (2) | Cremona |
| 15:00 CET (UTC+1) | Claiton 35' | Report | | Stadium: Stadio Giovanni Zini; Attendance: 1,359; Referee: Daniel Amabile |

| 3 December 2019 | Genoa (1) | 3–2 | Ascoli (2) | Genoa |
| 18:00 CET (UTC+1) | Pinamonti 14', 79'; Criscito 72' | Report | Beretta 48'; Criscito 68' (o.g.) | Stadium: Stadio Luigi Ferraris; Attendance: 1,825; Referee: Giovanni Ayroldi |

| 3 December 2019 | Fiorentina (1) | 2–0 | Cittadella (2) | Florence |
| 21:00 CET (UTC+1) | Benassi 21', 53'; Venuti (red card) 27' | Report | | Stadium: Stadio Artemio Franchi; Attendance: 8,988; Referee: Ivano Pezzuto |

| 4 December 2019 | Sassuolo (1) | 1–2 | Perugia (2) | Reggio Emilia |
| 15:00 CET (UTC+1) | Bourabia 82' | Report | Mazzocchi 10'; Nicolussi 17' | Stadium: Mapei Stadium – Città del Tricolore; Attendance: 1,215; Referee: Simone Sozza |

| 4 December 2019 | SPAL (1) | 5–1 | Lecce (1) | Ferrara |
| 18:00 CET (UTC+1) | Igor 18'; Paloschi 24'; Murgia 31'; Cionek 45'; Floccari 83' | Report | Imbula 55' | Stadium: Stadio Paolo Mazza; Attendance: 4,947; Referee: Antonio Giua |

| 4 December 2019 | Udinese (1) | 4–0 | Bologna (1) | Udine |
| 21:00 CET (UTC+1) | Barák 24'; De Maio 42'; Mandragora 77'; Lasagna 90+2' | Report | | Stadium: Dacia Arena; Attendance: 3,066; Referee: Marco Piccinini |

| 5 December 2019 | Parma (1) | 2–1 | Frosinone (2) | Parma |
| 18:00 CET (UTC+1) | Siligardi 20'; Hernani 90+2' (pen.) | Report | Trotta 71' | Stadium: Stadio Ennio Tardini; Attendance: 1,190; Referee: Federico Dionisi |

| 5 December 2019 | Cagliari (1) | 2–1 | Sampdoria (1) | Cagliari |
| 21:00 CET (UTC+1) | Cerri 7'; Ragatzu 48' | Report | Gabbiadini 87' | Stadium: Sardegna Arena; Attendance: 11,781; Referee: Gianluca Manganiello |

== Final stage ==
=== Bracket ===
Round of 16
Internazionale | 4
Cagliari | 1
Fiorentina | 2
Atalanta | 1
Napoli | 2
Perugia | 0
Lazio | 4
Cremonese | 0
Milan | 3
SPAL | 0
Torino (p) | 1 (5)
Genoa | 1 (3)
Juventus | 4
Udinese | 0
Parma | 0
Roma | 2

Quarter-finals
Internazionale | 2
Fiorentina | 1
Napoli | 1
Lazio | 0
Milan (a.e.t.) | 4
Torino | 2
Juventus | 3
Roma | 1

Semi-finals
Internazionale | 0 | 1 | 1
Napoli | 1 | 1 | 2
Milan | 1 | 0 | 1
Juventus (a) | 1 | 0 | 1

Final
Napoli (p) | 0 (4)
Juventus | 0 (2)

=== Round of 16 ===
The Round of 16 matches were played between clubs seeded 1–8 in 2018–19 Serie A and clubs advancing from the fourth round. For teams meeting from the same division, home field advantage was determined by a draw, not seed number. This rule also applied in the quarter-finals and semi-finals, although in the semi-finals, the draw only determined the home team in the second leg. The Round of 16 matches were played on 9, 14, 15, and 16 January.

| 9 January 2020 | Torino (1) | 1–1 (a.e.t.) (5–3 p) | Genoa (1) | Turin |
| 21:15 CET (UTC+1) | De Silvestri 23' | Report | Favilli 14' | Stadium: Stadio Olimpico Grande Torino; Attendance: 3,975; Referee: Juan Luca Sacchi |
| | Penalties |
| | Belotti (penalty scored); Millico (penalty scored); Rincón (penalty scored); Aina (penalty scored); Berenguer (penalty scored) | | (penalty scored) Destro; (penalty scored) Favilli; (penalty scored) Cassata; (penalty missed) Radovanović |

| 14 January 2020 | Napoli (1) | 2–0 | Perugia (2) | Naples |
| 15:00 CET (UTC+1) | Insigne 26' (pen.), 38' (pen.) | Report | | Stadium: Stadio San Paolo; Referee: Luca Massimi |

| 14 January 2020 | Lazio (1) | 4–0 | Cremonese (2) | Rome |
| 18:00 CET (UTC+1) | Patric 10'; Parolo 26'; Immobile 58' (pen.); Bastos 89' | Report | | Stadium: Stadio Olimpico; Attendance: 7,789; Referee: Lorenzo Maggioni |

| 14 January 2020 | Internazionale (1) | 4–1 | Cagliari (1) | Milan |
| 20:45 CET (UTC+1) | Lukaku 1', 49'; Valero 22'; Ranocchia 81' | Report | Oliva 73' | Stadium: San Siro; Attendance: 28,914; Referee: Daniele Chiffi |

| 15 January 2020 | Fiorentina (1) | 2–1 | Atalanta (1) | Florence |
| 15:00 CET (UTC+1) | Cutrone 11'; Lirola 84' | Report | Iličić 67' | Stadium: Stadio Artemio Franchi; Attendance: 13,395; Referee: Gianluca Manganiello |

| 15 January 2020 | Milan (1) | 3–0 | SPAL (1) | Milan |
| 18:00 CET (UTC+1) | Piątek 20'; Castillejo 44'; Hernandez 66' | Report | | Stadium: San Siro; Attendance: 32,093; Referee: Davide Ghersini |

| 15 January 2020 | Juventus (1) | 4–0 | Udinese (1) | Turin |
| 20:45 CET (UTC+1) | Higuaín 16'; Dybala 26' (pen.), 58'; Douglas Costa 61' (pen.) | Report | | Stadium: Allianz Stadium; Attendance: 39,524; Referee: Gianluca Aureliano |

| 16 January 2020 | Parma (1) | 0–2 | Roma (1) | Parma |
| 21:15 CET (UTC+1) | | Report | Pellegrini 49', 76' (pen.) | Stadium: Stadio Ennio Tardini; Attendance: 3,604; Referee: Luca Pairetto |

=== Quarter-finals ===
The quarter-final matches were played on 21, 22, 28, and 29 January. The results of the draw that determined the home team were published on 10 December 2019.

| 21 January 2020 | Napoli (1) | 1–0 | Lazio (1) | Naples |
| 20:45 CET (UTC+1) | Insigne 2' | Report | | Stadium: Stadio San Paolo; Attendance: 24,377; Referee: Davide Massa |

| 22 January 2020 | Juventus (1) | 3–1 | Roma (1) | Turin |
| 20:45 CET (UTC+1) | Ronaldo 26'; Bentancur 38'; Bonucci 45+2' | Report | Buffon 50' (o.g.) | Stadium: Allianz Stadium; Attendance: 40,791; Referee: Gianluca Rocchi |

| 28 January 2020 | Milan (1) | 4–2 (a.e.t.) | Torino (1) | Milan |
| 20:45 CET (UTC+1) | Bonaventura 12'; Çalhanoğlu 90+1', 106'; Ibrahimović 109' | Report | Bremer 34', 71' | Stadium: San Siro; Attendance: 36,462; Referee: Fabrizio Pasqua |

| 29 January 2020 | Internazionale (1) | 2–1 | Fiorentina (1) | Milan |
| 20:45 CET (UTC+1) | Candreva 44'; Barella 67' | Report | Cáceres 60' | Stadium: San Siro; Attendance: 51,431; Referee: Daniele Doveri |

=== Semi-finals ===
The first legs of the semi-final matches were played on 12 and 13 February. The second leg matches were scheduled to be played on 4 and 5 March, but were postponed to 12 and 13 June due to the coronavirus pandemic in Italy.

==== First leg ====
| 12 February 2020 | Internazionale (1) | 0–1 | Napoli (1) | Milan |
| 20:45 CET (UTC+1) | | Report | Fabián 57' | Stadium: San Siro; Attendance: 59,601; Referee: Gianpaolo Calvarese |

| 13 February 2020 | Milan (1) | 1–1 | Juventus (1) | Milan |
| 20:45 CET (UTC+1) | Rebić 61' | Report | Ronaldo 90+1' (pen.) | Stadium: San Siro; Attendance: 72,738; Referee: Paolo Valeri |

==== Second leg ====
| 12 June 2020 | Juventus (1) | 0–0 (1 (a) –1 agg.) | Milan (1) | Turin |
| 21:00 CEST (UTC+2) | | Report | | Stadium: Allianz Stadium; Attendance: 0 Referee: Daniele Orsato |
Note: Match postponed to 12 June from its original date of 4 March due to concerns over the coronavirus pandemic.

| 13 June 2020 | Napoli (1) | 1–1 (2–1 agg.) | Internazionale (1) | Naples |
| 21:00 CEST (UTC+2) | Mertens 41' | Report | Eriksen 2' | Stadium: Stadio San Paolo; Attendance: 0 Referee: Gianluca Rocchi |
Note: Match postponed to 13 June from its original date of 5 March due to concerns over the coronavirus pandemic.

== Final ==
17 June 2020
21:00 CEST (UTC+2)

| Napoli | 0–0 | Juventus |
|---|---|---|
| | Report |
Penalties
| Insigne (penalty scored); Politano (penalty scored); Maksimović (penalty scored); Milik (penalty scored) | 4–2 | (penalty missed) Dybala; (penalty missed) Danilo; (penalty scored) Bonucci; (penalty scored) Ramsey |

Stadio Olimpico, Rome
Attendance: 0 (Note: The final was played behind closed doors due to the COVID-19 pandemic in Italy.)
Referee: Daniele Doveri

== Top goalscorers ==
| Rank | Player | Club | Goals |
|---|---|---|---|
| 1 | (Italy) Gianluca Scamacca | Ascoli | 4 |
| 1 | (Italy) Michele Vano | Carpi | 4 |
| 3 | (Italy) Lorenzo Insigne | Napoli | 3 |
| 3 | (Italy) Rolando Mandragora | Udinese | 3 |
| 3 | (Italy) Tommaso Morosini | Südtirol | 3 |
| 3 | (Italy) Marcello Trotta | Frosinone | 3 |
| 7 | 40 players | | 2 |
