= List of Italian football transfers winter 2020–21 =

The 2020–21 winter transfer window for Italian football transfers opened on 2 January and closed on 31 January 2021. Additionally, players without a club could join at any time. This list includes transfers featuring at least one Serie A or Serie B club which were completed after the end of the summer 2020 transfer window on 5 October 2020 and before the end of the 2020–21 winter window.

== Transfers ==
Legend

- Those clubs in Italic indicate that the player already left the team on loan on this or the previous season or new signing that immediately left the club.

Date	Name	Moving from	Moving to	Fee
6 October 2020	(Portugal) João Mário	Inter Milan	(Portugal) Sporting CP	Loan
6 October 2020	(The Gambia) Musa Juwara	Bologna	(Portugal) Boavista	Loan
6 October 2020	Armando Anastasio	Monza	(Croatia) Rijeka	Loan
6 October 2020	(Portugal) Jorge Silva	Lazio	(Portugal) Boavista	Loan
7 October 2020	(Senegal) Yves Baraye	Parma	(Portugal) Gil Vicente	Undisclosed (Note: The player already played for his new club in the 2019–20 season; the deal turned from temporary to definitive.)
7 October 2020	(France) M'Bala Nzola	Trapani	Spezia	Free
8 October 2020	(Ghana) Emmanuel Besea	Frosinone	Viterbese	Free
13 October 2020	(Albania) Elhan Kastrati	Unattached	Cittadella	Free
14 October 2020	(Colombia) Juan Manuel Valencia	Bologna	(Russia) Baltika	Loan
16 October 2020	(Portugal) Alexandre Pimenta	Venezia	(Portugal) Pedras Rubras	Loan
18 October 2020	(Brazil) Felipe Vizeu	Udinese	(Brazil) Ceará	Loan
20 October 2020	Mirko Albertazzi	Unattached	Virtus Entella	Free
21 October 2020	Francesco Margiotta	Unattached	Chievo	Free
9 November 2020	(Brazil) Alan Empereur	Hellas Verona	(Brazil) Palmeiras	Loan
7 December 2020	Mario Balotelli	Unattached	Monza	Free
9 December 2020	(Brazil) Pedro	Fiorentina	(Brazil) Flamengo	Undisclosed (Note: The player already played for his new club in the first half of the 2020–21 season; the deal turned from temporary to definitive.)
10 December 2020	(Spain) Cristo González	Udinese	(Spain) Mirandés	Loan
11 December 2020	Stefano Minelli	Unattached	SPAL	Free
22 December 2020	(France) Axel Bakayoko	Inter Milan	(Serbia) Red Star Belgrade	Undisclosed
4 January 2021	(Denmark) Joakim Mæhle	(Belgium) Genk	Atalanta	Undisclosed
4 January 2021	(Finland) Lauri Ala-Myllymäki	(Finland) Ilves	Venezia	Free
4 January 2021	(Belgium) Radja Nainggolan	Inter Milan	Cagliari	Loan
4 January 2021	Vincenzo Millico	Torino	Frosinone	Loan
5 January 2021	Riccardo Saponara	Fiorentina	Spezia	Loan
5 January 2021	Michele Vano	Hellas Verona	Perugia	Loan
5 January 2021	Marco Carnesecchi	Atalanta	Cremonese	Loan
5 January 2021	Matteo Scozzarella	Parma	Monza	Undisclosed
6 January 2021	Giuseppe Carriero	Parma	Avellino	Undisclosed
7 January 2021	(Ivory Coast) Muhamed Olawale	Parma	(Finland) Mariehamn	Loan
7 January 2021	(Ivory Coast) Moussa Kone	Parma	(Finland) Mariehamn	Loan
7 January 2021	(Netherlands) Stefano Denswil	Bologna	(Belgium) Club Brugge	Loan
7 January 2021	(Senegal) Joel Baraye	Salernitana	Avellino	Loan
7 January 2021	Mirko Bruccini	Cosenza	Alessandria	Undisclosed
7 January 2021	Luca Germoni	Reggiana	Como	Loan
7 January 2021	Patrick Cutrone	Fiorentina	(England) Wolverhampton	Loan return
7 January 2021	(Ivory Coast) Amad	Atalanta	(England) Manchester United	Undisclosed
8 January 2021	(Senegal) Mamadou Coulibaly	Udinese	Salernitana	Loan
8 January 2021	Francesco Mezzoni	Napoli	Pro Vercelli	Loan
8 January 2021	Tommaso Farabegoli	Sampdoria	Feralpisalò	Loan
9 January 2021	(Poland) Bartosz Salamon	SPAL	(Poland) Lech Poznań	Loan
9 January 2021	(The Gambia) Musa Juwara	(Portugal) Boavista	Bologna	Loan return
10 January 2021	(France) Adama Soumaoro	(France) Lille	Bologna	Loan
11 January 2021	(Argentina) Julián Illanes	Fiorentina	Avellino	Loan
11 January 2021	Paolo Bartolomei	Spezia	Cremonese	Undisclosed
11 January 2021	Simone Pinna	Cagliari	Ascoli	Loan
11 January 2021	(Brazil) Léo Duarte	AC Milan	(Turkey) İstanbul Başakşehir	18-month loan
12 January 2021	Ernesto Torregrossa	Brescia	Sampdoria	Loan
12 January 2021	(Northern Ireland) Kyle Lafferty	Reggina	Unattached	Released
12 January 2021	(Romania) Claudiu Micovschi	Genoa	Reggina	Loan
12 January 2021	(Romania) Adrian Stoian	(Romania) Viitorul Constanța	Ascoli	Free
12 January 2021	Christian Scorza	Ascoli	Piacenza	18-month loan
12 January 2021	Christian Ventola	Pescara	Arezzo	Undisclosed
12 January 2021	Luca Rossettini	Lecce	Padova	Undisclosed
12 January 2021	Filippo Serena	Venezia	Gubbio	Undisclosed
12 January 2021	Matteo Ardemagni	Frosinone	Reggiana	Loan
12 January 2021	(Spain) Pol Lirola	Fiorentina	(France) Marseille	Loan
12 January 2021	Federico Ricci	Sassuolo	Monza	Loan
12 January 2021	(Croatia) Fran Karačić	(Croatia) Dinamo Zagreb	Brescia	Undisclosed
13 January 2021	Simone Guerra	Vicenza	Feralpisalò	Undisclosed
13 January 2021	Luca Tremolada	Pordenone	Cosenza	Loan
13 January 2021	(Netherlands) Hidde ter Avest	Udinese	(Netherlands) Utrecht	Undisclosed
14 January 2021	(Netherlands) Kevin Strootman	(France) Marseille	Genoa	Loan
14 January 2021	(Morocco) Hachim Mastour	Reggina	Carpi	Loan
14 January 2021	(Brazil) Nícolas Andrade	Udinese	Reggina	Undisclosed
14 January 2021	(Ivory Coast) Yao Eloge Koffi	Unattached	Reggiana	Free
14 January 2021	Lorenzo Del Pinto	Benevento	Reggiana	Undisclosed
14 January 2021	(Morocco) Soufiane Bidaoui	Unattached	Ascoli	Free
14 January 2021	Ivan De Santis	Virtus Entella	Modena	Loan
15 January 2021	Mattia Zennaro	Genoa	Lucchese	Loan
15 January 2021	(France) Soualiho Meïté	Torino	AC Milan	Loan
15 January 2021	Davide Marsura	Livorno	Pisa	Undisclosed
15 January 2021	Stefano Gori	Juventus	Pisa	Loan
15 January 2021	Sebastiano Esposito	Inter Milan	Venezia	Loan
15 January 2021	(Croatia) Petar Brlek	Genoa	(Croatia) Osijek	Undisclosed
15 January 2021	Mattia Mustacchio	Crotone	Alessandria	Undisclosed
15 January 2021	Giuseppe Borello	Crotone	Cesena	Loan
15 January 2021	Giacomo Satalino	Sassuolo	Monopoli	Loan
16 January 2021	(Denmark) Morten Hjulmand	(Austria) Admira Wacker	Lecce	Undisclosed
16 January 2021	(Equatorial Guinea) José Machín	Monza	Pescara	Loan
16 January 2021	Davide Agazzi	Livorno	Vicenza	Undisclosed
16 January 2021	(Romania) Raul Șteau	Sassuolo	Monopoli	Loan
17 January 2021	(Ghana) Alfred Duncan	Fiorentina	Cagliari	Loan
18 January 2021	Elia Giani	Pisa	Pontedera	Loan
18 January 2021	Armando Anastasio	(Croatia) Rijeka	Monza	Loan return
18 January 2021	(Croatia) Tomislav Gomelt	Crotone	(Netherlands) ADO Den Haag	Undisclosed
19 January 2021	Alessandro Capello	Venezia	Virtus Entella	Undisclosed
19 January 2021	(Croatia) Mario Mandžukić	Unattached	AC Milan	Free
19 January 2021	(North Macedonia) Boban Nikolov	(Hungary) Fehérvár	Lecce	Undisclosed
19 January 2021	Fabio Pisacane	Cagliari	Lecce	Undisclosed
19 January 2021	(France) Sanasi Sy	(France) Amiens	Salernitana	Undisclosed
19 January 2021	(Serbia) Ivan Lakićević	Genoa	Reggina	Free
20 January 2021	(Nigeria) Theophilus Awua	Spezia	Pro Vercelli	Loan
20 January 2021	Giovanni Crociata	Crotone	Empoli	Loan
20 January 2021	Manuel Pucciarelli	Chievo	(United Arab Emirates) Dibba Al-Fujairah	Loan
20 January 2021	Nicola Bizzotto	Vicenza	Monopoli	Undisclosed
20 January 2021	(Denmark) Frederik Sørensen	(Germany) 1. FC Köln	Pescara	Free
20 January 2021	Gennaro Borrelli	Cosenza	Juve Stabia	Loan
21 January 2021	Andrea Conti	AC Milan	Parma	Loan
21 January 2021	(Poland) Arkadiusz Milik	Napoli	(France) Marseille	18-month loan
21 January 2021	(Argentina) Nahuel Valentini	Padova	Vicenza	Loan
21 January 2021	Youssef Maleh	Venezia	Fiorentina	Undisclosed
21 January 2021	Youssef Maleh	Fiorentina	Venezia	Loan
22 January 2021	Arturo Calabresi	Bologna	Cagliari	Loan
22 January 2021	Christian Dalle Mura	Fiorentina	Reggina	Loan
22 January 2021	Luca Mora	Spezia	SPAL	Undisclosed
22 January 2021	Marco Tumminello	Atalanta	SPAL	Loan
22 January 2021	(Denmark) Riza Durmisi	Lazio	Salernitana	Undisclosed
22 January 2021	(Denmark) Jens Odgaard	Sassuolo	Pescara	Loan
22 January 2021	(England) Fikayo Tomori	(England) Chelsea	AC Milan	Loan
22 January 2021	(Greece) Vasilis Zagaritis	(Greece) Panathinaikos	Parma	Undisclosed
22 January 2021	(Uruguay) Edgar Elizalde	Pescara	Juve Stabia	Loan
23 January 2021	Andrea Adorante	Parma	Virtus Francavilla	Loan
23 January 2021	Stefano Sturaro	Genoa	Hellas Verona	Loan
23 January 2021	Marcello Trotta	Frosinone	Cosenza	Loan
24 January 2021	Federico Dionisi	Frosinone	Ascoli	Undisclosed
26 January 2021	(Croatia) Antonio Marin	Monza	(Croatia) Dinamo Zagreb	Loan return
26 January 2021	Alberto Gerbo	Ascoli	Cosenza	Undisclosed
26 January 2021	Andrea Danzi	Hellas Verona	Ascoli	Loan
26 January 2021	(Romania) Vlad Dragomir	Perugia	Virtus Entella	Undisclosed
26 January 2021	Lorenzo Colombo	AC Milan	Cremonese	Loan
26 January 2021	Luca Coccolo	Juventus	Cremonese	Loan
26 January 2021	Kevin Lasagna	Udinese	Hellas Verona	18-month loan
26 January 2021	(Tunisia) Karim Laribi	Hellas Verona	Reggiana	Loan
26 January 2021	(Argentina) Alejandro Gómez	Atalanta	(Argentina) Sevilla	Loan
26 January 2021	Giovanni Di Noia	Chievo	Perugia	Loan
26 January 2021	Fabio Depaoli	Sampdoria	Benevento	Loan
26 January 2021	Adriano Montalto	Bari	Reggina	Undisclosed
27 January 2021	(Argentina) Mateo Musacchio	AC Milan	Lazio	Undisclosed
27 January 2021	(Russia) Aleksandr Kokorin	(Russia) Spartak Moscow	Fiorentina	Undisclosed
27 January 2021	Marco D'Alessandro	SPAL	Monza	Undisclosed
27 January 2021	Nicola Rigoni	Monza	Pescara	Loan
27 January 2021	Luca Antei	Pescara	Benevento	Loan return
27 January 2021	Simone Sini	Ascoli	Alessandria	Undisclosed
27 January 2021	(Spain) Fernando Llorente	Napoli	Udinese	Undisclosed
28 January 2021	(France) Kévin Malcuit	Napoli	Fiorentina	Loan
28 January 2021	(Netherlands) Bobby Adekanye	Lazio	(Netherlands) ADO Den Haag	Loan
28 January 2021	(Morocco) Sofian Kiyine	Lazio	Salernitana	Loan
28 January 2021	Luca Lombardi	Monza	Teramo	Loan
28 January 2021	Samuel Di Carmine	Hellas Verona	Crotone	Loan
28 January 2021	(The Gambia) Fallou Njie	Genoa	(Albania) Skënderbeu	Loan
29 January 2021	Davide Diaw	Pordenone	Monza	Undisclosed
29 January 2021	Alessandro Deiola	Spezia	Cagliari	Loan return
29 January 2021	Paolo Faragò	Cagliari	Bologna	Loan
29 January 2021	Nicolò Rovella	Genoa	Juventus	€18M
29 January 2021	Nicolò Rovella	Juventus	Genoa	18-month loan
29 January 2021	Elia Petrelli	Juventus	Genoa	€8M
29 January 2021	Manolo Portanova	Juventus	Genoa	€10M
29 January 2021	(Romania) Dennis Man	(Romania) FCSB	Parma	Loan
29 January 2021	Pietro Rovaglia	Chievo	Pistoiese	Loan
30 January 2021	Luca Siligardi	Parma	Reggiana	Loan
30 January 2021	Giacomo Ricci	Parma	Venezia	Loan
30 January 2021	Riccardo Gatti	Reggiana	Catanzaro	Loan
30 January 2021	(Spain) Gerard Deulofeu	(England) Watford	Udinese	Undisclosed
30 January 2021	Stephan El Shaarawy	(China) Shanghai Shenhua	Roma	Free
30 January 2021	(Cyprus) Andreas Karo	Lazio	(Portugal) Marítimo	Undisclosed
30 January 2021	Simone Edera	Torino	Reggina	Loan
30 January 2021	(Argentina) Adolfo Gaich	(Russia) CSKA Moscow	Benevento	Loan
30 January 2021	Stefano Minelli	SPAL	Perugia	Loan
31 January 2021	Davide Di Gennaro	Lazio	Cesena	Undisclosed
31 January 2021	(Belgium) Silvio Proto	Lazio	Unattached	Released
31 January 2021	Pietro Iemmello	Benevento	Frosinone	Undisclosed
31 January 2021	Andrea Beghetto	Frosinone	Pisa	Loan
31 January 2021	(Paraguay) Antonio Sanabria	(Spain) Betis	Torino	Undisclosed
31 January 2021	Elia Petrelli	Genoa	Reggina	Loan
1 February 2021	Franco Lepore	Monza	Triestina	Undisclosed
1 February 2021	Mattia Finotto	Monza	Pordenone	Loan
1 February 2021	Nicola Mosti	Monza	Ascoli	Loan
1 February 2021	Federico Del Frate	Monza	Pro Sesto	Undisclosed
1 February 2021	(Slovakia) Denis Vavro	Lazio	(Spain) Huesca	Loan
1 February 2021	Luigi Vitale	Hellas Verona	Frosinone	Undisclosed
1 February 2021	Thomas Vettorel	Unattached	Frosinone	Free
1 February 2021	Enrico Brignola	Sassuolo	Frosinone	Loan
1 February 2021	Pietro Giordani	Frosinone	Fiorentina	Loan
1 February 2021	Michele Volpe	Frosinone	Catania	Loan
1 February 2021	Andrea Tabanelli	Frosinone	Pescara	Loan
1 February 2021	(Poland) Kacper Urbański	(Poland) Lechia Gdańsk	Bologna	Loan
1 February 2021	(Argentina) Nehuén Paz	Bologna	(Turkey) Kayserispor	Loan
1 February 2021	(Nigeria) Kingsley Michael	Bologna	Reggina	Loan
1 February 2021	(Nigeria) Orji Okwonkwo	Bologna	Reggina	Loan
1 February 2021	(Bulgaria) Valentin Antov	(Bulgaria) CSKA Sofia	Bologna	Loan
1 February 2021	Daniele Rugani	Juventus	Cagliari	Loan
1 February 2021	Rolando Mandragora	Juventus	Torino	Loan
1 February 2021	Mattia Bani	Genoa	Parma	Loan
1 February 2021	(Denmark) Lukas Lerager	Genoa	(Denmark) Copenhagen	Loan
1 February 2021	(Netherlands) Joshua Zirkzee	(Germany) Bayern Munich	Parma	Loan
1 February 2021	Jacopo Dezi	Parma	Venezia	Undisclosed
1 February 2021	(Netherlands) Jayden Braaf	(England) Manchester City	Udinese	Loan
1 February 2021	(Lithuania) Edgaras Dubickas	Lecce	Livorno	Loan
1 February 2021	(Turkey) Güven Yalçın	(Turkey) Beşiktaş	Lecce	Loan
1 February 2021	Christian Maggio	Benevento	Lecce	Free
1 February 2021	Roberto Pierno	Lecce	Catanzaro	Loan
1 February 2021	Davide Lanzafame	(Turkey) Adana Demirspor	Vicenza	Free
1 February 2021	Alessandro Marotta	Vicenza	Juve Stabia	Undisclosed
1 February 2021	(Croatia) Marko Pajač	Cagliari	Brescia	Undisclosed
1 February 2021	(Uruguay) Christian Oliva	Cagliari	(Spain) Valencia	Loan
1 February 2021	Fabrizio Caligara	Cagliari	Ascoli	Loan
1 February 2021	(Poland) Jakub Sangowski	(Poland) Zagłębie Sosnowiec	Cagliari	Loan
1 February 2021	Antonio Di Gaudio	Hellas Verona	Chievo	Loan
1 February 2021	Jacopo Segre	Torino	SPAL	Loan
1 February 2021	Antonio Rosati	Torino	Fiorentina	Undisclosed
1 February 2021	(Algeria) Adam Ounas	Napoli	Crotone	Loan
1 February 2021	Francesco Rodio	Crotone	Fano	Loan
1 February 2021	Zak Ruggiero	Crotone	Pro Sesto	Loan
1 February 2021	Federico Panza	Crotone	Biancavilla	Loan
1 February 2021	(France) Gabriel Charpentier	Genoa	Ascoli	Loan
1 February 2021	Cosimo Chiricò	Ascoli	Padova	Loan
1 February 2021	(Serbia) Nikola Ninković	Ascoli	Brescia	Free
1 February 2021	(Czech Republic) Jaromír Zmrhal	Brescia	(Czech Republic) Mladá Boleslav	Loan
1 February 2021	Daniele Dessena	Brescia	Pescara	Undisclosed
1 February 2021	Niccolò Giannetti	Salernitana	Pescara	Loan
1 February 2021	(Poland) Paweł Jaroszyński	Pescara	Salernitana	Loan
1 February 2021	(Spain) Raúl Asencio	Genoa	SPAL	Loan
1 February 2021	(Ukraine) Viktor Kovalenko	(Ukraine) Shakhtar Donetsk	Atalanta	Loan
1 February 2021	Vittorio Parigini	Genoa	Ascoli	Loan
1 February 2021	Alessandro Farroni	Reggina	Juve Stabia	Loan
1 February 2021	Paolo Marchi	Reggina	Piacenza	Loan
1 February 2021	Luca Chierico	Genoa	Reggina	Loan
2 February 2021	(Norway) Julian Kristoffersen	Unattached	Salernitana	Free
3 February 2021	(Ghana) Kwadwo Asamoah	Unattached	Cagliari	Free
5 February 2021	Graziano Pellè	Unattached	Parma	Free
8 February 2021	(Sweden) Jonathan Morsay	Chievo	(Romania) Dinamo București	Loan
8 February 2021	(Serbia) Strahinja Tanasijević	Chievo	(Serbia) Čukarički	Undisclosed
9 February 2021	(Austria) Lukas Spendlhofer	Ascoli	(Israel) Bnei Sakhnin	Loan
10 February 2021	Ľubomír Tupta	Hellas Verona	(Switzerland) Sion	Loan
11 February 2021	Marco Fossati	Monza	(Croatia) Hajduk Split	Loan
12 February 2021	Vincenzo Venditti	Unattached	Ascoli	Free
15 February 2021	(Switzerland) Darian Males	Inter Milan	(Switzerland) Basel	Loan
15 February 2021	(Croatia) Ante Ćorić	Roma	(Slovenia) Olimpija Ljubljana	Loan
15 February 2021	(Finland) Niki Mäenpää	Unattached	Venezia	Free
16 February 2021	(Switzerland) Nicky Beloko	Fiorentina	(Switzerland) Neuchâtel Xamax	Loan
