= Maniero =

Maniero is an Italian surname. Notable people with the surname include:

- Alvise Maniero (born 1985), Italian politician
- Enrico Maniero (born 1960), Italian football midfielder
- Felice Maniero (born 1954), Italian crime boss
- Filippo Maniero (born 1972), Italian footballer
- Francesca Maniero (born 1999), Italian roller hockey player
- Luca Maniero (disambiguation), multiple people
- Riccardo Maniero (born 1987), Italian football forward
