= 2020–21 Serie C =

Serie C
- Season: 2020–21
- Dates: Regular season: 26 September 2020 – 2 May 2021; Play-offs and play-outs: 9 May 2021 – 17 June 2021
- Promoted: Como; Perugia; Ternana; Alessandria (via play-off)
- Relegated: Novara (excluded); Livorno; Sambenedettese (excluded); Carpi (excluded); Fano; Ravenna; Arezzo; Casertana (excluded); Bisceglie; Cavese; Trapani (excluded)
- Matches: 1,102
- Goals: 2,604 (2.36 per match)
- Top goalscorer: Jacopo Manconi (15+3 goals); Anthony Partipilo (18 goals)
- Biggest home win: Piacenza 6–0 Pro Sesto; Juventus U23 6–0 Livorno; Padova 6–0 Carpi
- Biggest away win: Mantova 0–6 Padova
- Highest scoring: Lucchese 4–5 AlbinoLeffe; Ternana 7–2 Cavese
- Longest winning run: 11 matches Ternana
- Longest unbeaten run: 24 matches Ternana
- Longest winless run: 18 matches Ravenna; Vibonese
- Longest losing run: 10 matches Cavese; Imolese

The 2020–21 Serie C was the 62nd season of the Serie C, the third tier of the Italian football league system, organized by the Lega Pro.

== Teams ==
The league was initially to be contested by 60 teams, but was reduced to 59 following the exclusion of Trapani.

=== Relegated from Serie B ===
- Perugia
- Trapani (subsequently excluded)
- Juve Stabia
- Livorno

=== Promoted from Serie D ===
- Lucchese (Girone A winners)
- Pro Sesto (Girone B winners)
- Legnago (Girone C runners-up) (Note: Promoted due to Campodarsego renouncing promotion.)
- Mantova (Girone D winners)
- Grosseto (Girone E winners)
- Matelica (Girone F winners)
- Turris (Girone G winners)
- Foggia (Girone H winners) (Note: Bitonto was deducted five points because of match-fixing.)
- Palermo (Girone I winners)

=== Readmissions ===
Following the disbandment of Sicula Leonzio and Siena, two relegated clubs were readmitted as members of Serie C.

- Giana Erminio
- Ravenna

=== During the season ===
On 4 October 2020, Trapani was excluded from the league after failing to play two consecutive matches.

== Stadia and locations ==
=== Group A (North & Central West) ===
8 teams from Lombardy, 6 teams from Tuscany, 4 teams from Piedmont, 1 team from Emilia-Romagna and 1 team from Sardinia.

Location of teams in Serie C (Group A) 2020–21
Location of teams in 2020–21 Serie C (Group A) (Lombardy)

Club	City	Stadium	Capacity
AlbinoLeffe	Albino and Leffe	Città di Gorgonzola (Gorgonzola)	3,766
Alessandria	Alessandria	Giuseppe Moccagatta	5,926
Carrarese	Carrara	Dei Marmi	9,500
Como	Como	Giuseppe Sinigaglia	13,602
Giana Erminio	Gorgonzola	Città di Gorgonzola	3,766
Grosseto	Grosseto	Olimpico Carlo Zecchini	9,988
Juventus U23	Turin	Giuseppe Moccagatta (Alessandria)	5,926
Lecco	Lecco	Rigamonti-Ceppi	4,997
Livorno	Livorno	Armando Picchi	14,267
Lucchese	Lucca	Porta Elisa	12,800
Novara	Novara	Silvio Piola (Novara)	17,875
Olbia	Olbia	Bruno Nespoli	4,000
Pergolettese	Crema	Giuseppe Voltini	4,095
Piacenza	Piacenza	Leonardo Garilli	21,668
Pistoiese	Pistoia	Marcello Melani	13,195
Pontedera	Pontedera	Ettore Mannucci	2,700
Pro Patria	Busto Arsizio	Carlo Speroni	5,000
Pro Sesto	Sesto San Giovanni	Breda	4,501
Pro Vercelli	Vercelli	Silvio Piola (Vercelli)	5,500
Renate	Renate	Città di Meda (Meda)	2,500

=== Group B (North & Central East) ===
5 teams from Emilia-Romagna, 5 teams from Marche, 3 teams from Veneto, 2 teams from Lombardy, 2 teams from Umbria, 1 team from Friuli-Venezia Giulia, 1 team from Trentino-Alto Adige/Südtirol and 1 team from Tuscany.

Location of teams in Serie C (Group B) 2020–21

Club	City	Stadium	Capacity
Arezzo	Arezzo	Città di Arezzo	13,128
Carpi	Carpi	Sandro Cabassi	5,510
Cesena	Cesena	Dino Manuzzi	20,194
Fano	Fano	Raffaele Mancini	8,880
FeralpiSalò	Salò and Lonato del Garda	Lino Turina (Salò)	2,364
Fermana	Fermo	Bruno Recchioni	8,920
Gubbio	Gubbio	Pietro Barbetti	4,939
Imolese	Imola	Mario Gavagnin-Sinibaldo Nocini (Verona); Romeo Galli	1,500; 4,000
Legnago	Legnago	Mario Sandrini	2,152
Mantova	Mantua	Danilo Martelli	14,884
Matelica	Matelica	Helvia Recina (Macerata)	4,315
Modena	Modena	Alberto Braglia	21,092
Padova	Padua	Euganeo	32,420
Perugia	Perugia	Renato Curi	23,625
Ravenna	Ravenna	Bruno Benelli	12,020
Sambenedettese	San Benedetto del Tronto	Riviera delle Palme	22,000
Südtirol	Bolzano	Lino Turina (Salò); Druso	2,364; 3,000
Triestina	Trieste	Nereo Rocco	26,500
Virtus Verona	Verona	Mario Gavagnin-Sinibaldo Nocini	1,500
Vis Pesaro	Pesaro	Tonino Benelli	4,898

=== Group C (Centre & South) ===
6 teams from Campania, 5 teams from Apulia, 3 teams from Sicily, 2 teams from Calabria, 1 team from Abruzzo, 1 team from Basilicata, 1 team from Lazio and 1 from Umbria.

Location of teams in Serie C (Group C) 2020–21

Club	City	Stadium	Capacity
Avellino	Avellino	Partenio-Adriano Lombardi	26,308
Bari	Bari	San Nicola	58,270
Bisceglie	Bisceglie	Gustavo Ventura	3,200
Casertana	Caserta	Alberto Pinto	12,000
Catania	Catania	Angelo Massimino	20,016
Catanzaro	Catanzaro	Nicola Ceravolo	14,650
Cavese	Cava de' Tirreni	Simonetta Lamberti	5,200
Foggia	Foggia	Pino Zaccheria	25,085
Juve Stabia	Castellammare di Stabia	Romeo Menti	7,642
Monopoli	Monopoli	Vito Simone Veneziani	6,880
Paganese	Pagani	Marcello Torre	5,093
Palermo	Palermo	Renzo Barbera	36,365
Potenza	Potenza	Alfredo Viviani	4,977
Teramo	Teramo	Gaetano Bonolis	7,498
Ternana	Terni	Libero Liberati	22,000
Trapani	Trapani	Polisportivo Provinciale (Erice)	7,608
Turris	Torre del Greco	Amerigo Liguori	3,566
Vibonese	Vibo Valentia	Luigi Razza	5,000
Virtus Francavilla	Francavilla Fontana	Giovanni Paolo II	2,137
Viterbese	Viterbo	Enrico Rocchi	5,460

== League tables ==
=== Group A (North & Central West) ===
Pos	Team	Pld	W	D	L	GF	GA	GD	Pts	Qualification
1	Como (C, P)	38	23	6	9	59	44	+15	75	Promotion to Serie B. Qualification for the Supercoppa di Serie C
2	Alessandria (O, P)	38	20	8	10	48	29	+19	68	Qualification to the promotion play-offs
3	Renate	38	19	8	11	47	36	+11	65	Qualification to the promotion play-offs
4	Pro Vercelli	38	17	12	9	48	35	+13	63	Qualification to the promotion play-offs
5	Pro Patria	38	16	13	9	37	28	+9	61	Qualification to the promotion play-offs
6	Lecco	38	16	12	10	50	36	+14	60	Qualification to the promotion play-offs
7	AlbinoLeffe	38	14	15	9	43	36	+7	57	Qualification to the promotion play-offs
8	Pontedera	38	14	13	11	47	40	+7	55	Qualification to the promotion play-offs
9	Grosseto	38	14	12	12	43	41	+2	54	Qualification to the promotion play-offs
10	Juventus U23	38	14	10	14	52	50	+2	52	Qualification to the promotion play-offs
11	Novara (D, R)	38	12	13	13	48	49	−1	49 (Note: Novara finished ahead of Piacenza on head-to-head points: Piacenza 3–3 Novara, Novara 2–0 Piacenza.)	Excluded and relegated to Serie D
12	Piacenza	38	12	13	13	47	48	−1	49	
13	Olbia	38	10	17	11	47	47	0	47	
14	Giana Erminio	38	11	11	16	36	45	−9	44 (Note: Giana Erminio and Pergolettese finished ahead of Carrarese on head-to-head points: Giana Erminio 7, Pergolettese 7, Carrarese 3. Giana Erminio finished ahead of Pergolettese on head-to-head points: Giana Erminio 2–0 Pergolettese, Pergolettese 0–0 Giana Erminio.)	
15	Pergolettese	38	12	8	18	45	52	−7	44	
16	Carrarese (Note: Since Carrarese finished more than 8 points ahead of Lucchese, the relegation play-out was not played and Lucchese were originally relegated directly.)	38	11	11	16	34	40	−6	44	
17	Pro Sesto (Note: Since Pro Sesto finished more than 8 points ahead of Pistoiese, the relegation play-out was not played and Pistoiese were originally relegated directly.)	38	10	13	15	31	45	−14	43	
18	Pistoiese	38	8	7	23	27	52	−25	31 (Note: Pistoiese finished ahead of Lucchese on head-to-head goal difference: Pistoiese 2–0 Lucchese, Lucchese 1–0 Pistoiese.)	Readmitted
19	Lucchese	38	6	13	19	36	60	−24	31	Readmitted
20	Livorno (Note: Livorno have 5 points deducted due to financial irregularities) (R)	38	7	13	18	41	53	−12	29	Relegated and disbanded

Source: Lega Pro (in Italian), Soccerway (in English)
Rules for classification: 1) Points; 2) Head-to-head points; 3) Head-to-head goal difference; 4) Goal difference; 5) Goals scored; 6) Lower goals against; 7) Wins; 8) Lower losses; 9) Away wins; 10) Lower home losses.
(C) Champions; (D) Disqualified; (O) Play-off winners; (P) Promoted; (R) Relegated

=== Group B (North & Central East) ===
Pos	Team	Pld	W	D	L	GF	GA	GD	Pts	Qualification
1	Perugia (C, P)	38	23	10	5	67	30	+37	79 (Note: Perugia finished ahead of Padova on head-to-head goal difference: Perugia 3–0 Padova, Padova 1–0 Perugia.)	Promotion to Serie B. Qualification for the Supercoppa di Serie C
2	Padova	38	24	7	7	68	26	+42	79	Qualification to the promotion play-offs
3	Südtirol	38	21	12	5	66	29	+37	75	Qualification to the promotion play-offs
4	Modena (Note: Virtus Verona qualified to the Promotion play-offs since Modena was the best fourth-placed team based on points per game: Modena 1.842, Bari 1.750, Pro Vercelli 1.657.)	38	21	7	10	51	28	+23	70	Qualification to the promotion play-offs
5	Feralpisalò	38	17	9	12	54	46	+8	60	Qualification to the promotion play-offs
6	Triestina	38	15	14	9	48	40	+8	59	Qualification to the promotion play-offs
7	Cesena	38	15	12	11	51	42	+9	57	Qualification to the promotion play-offs
8	Matelica	38	16	8	14	59	62	−3	56	Qualification to the promotion play-offs
9	Sambenedettese (Note: Sambenedettese have 4 points deducted due to financial irregularities.) (D, R)	38	14	12	12	43	43	0	50	Excluded and relegated to Serie D
10	Mantova	38	12	13	13	47	49	−2	49 (Note: Mantova finished ahead of Virtus Verona on head-to-head points: Virtus Verona 1–1 Mantova, Mantova 3–2 Virtus Verona.)	Qualification to the promotion play-offs
11	Virtus Verona	38	11	16	11	43	44	−1	49	Qualification to the promotion play-offs
12	Gubbio	38	12	12	14	40	45	−5	48	
13	Fermana	38	9	15	14	31	44	−13	42	
14	Vis Pesaro	38	11	8	19	41	57	−16	41 (Note: Vis Pesaro finished ahead of Carpi on head-to-head points: Vis Pesaro 3–2 Carpi, Carpi 0–2 Vis Pesaro.)	
15	Carpi (D, R)	38	10	11	17	45	62	−17	41	Excluded and relegated to Serie D
16	Legnago (O)	38	8	14	16	35	47	−12	38	Qualification to the relegation play-outs
17	Imolese (O)	38	9	8	21	34	55	−21	35	Qualification to the relegation play-outs
18	Fano (R)	38	5	18	15	32	47	−15	33	Qualification to the relegation play-outs
19	Ravenna (R)	38	6	12	20	32	62	−30	30	Qualification to the relegation play-outs
20	Arezzo (R)	38	5	14	19	37	66	−29	29	Relegation to Serie D

Source: Lega Pro (in Italian), Soccerway (in English)
Rules for classification: 1) Points; 2) Head-to-head points; 3) Head-to-head goal difference; 4) Goal difference; 5) Goals scored; 6) Lower goals against; 7) Wins; 8) Lower losses; 9) Away wins; 10) Lower home losses.
(C) Champions; (D) Disqualified; (O) Play-off winners; (P) Promoted; (R) Relegated

=== Group C (Centre & South) ===
Pos	Team	Pld	W	D	L	GF	GA	GD	Pts	Qualification
1	Ternana (C, P)	36	28	6	2	95	32	+63	90	Promotion to Serie B. Qualification for the Supercoppa di Serie C
2	Catanzaro	36	19	11	6	44	29	+15	68 (Note: Catanzaro finished ahead of Avellino on head-to-head goal difference: Avellino 1–3 Catanzaro, Catanzaro 0–1 Avellino.)	Qualification to the promotion play-offs
3	Avellino	36	20	8	8	53	33	+20	68	Qualification to the promotion play-offs
4	Bari	36	18	9	9	52	34	+18	63	Qualification to the promotion play-offs
5	Juve Stabia	36	18	7	11	51	39	+12	61	Qualification to the promotion play-offs
6	Catania (Note: Catania have 2 points deducted due to financial irregularities.)	36	17	10	9	50	38	+12	59	Qualification to the promotion play-offs
7	Palermo	36	14	11	11	44	40	+4	53	Qualification to the promotion play-offs
8	Teramo	36	13	13	10	38	34	+4	52	Qualification to the promotion play-offs
9	Foggia	36	14	9	13	36	39	−3	51	Qualification to the promotion play-offs
10	Casertana (D, R)	36	13	6	17	47	59	−12	45	Excluded and relegated to Serie D
11	Monopoli	36	10	11	15	43	51	−8	41	
12	Viterbese	36	9	13	14	36	42	−6	40	
13	Potenza	36	10	9	17	38	52	−14	39 (Note: Potenza finished ahead of Turris on head-to-head points: Turris 0–2 Potenza, Potenza 2–1 Turris.)	
14	Turris	36	9	12	15	40	56	−16	39	
15	Virtus Francavilla	36	9	11	16	32	44	−12	38	
16	Vibonese (Note: Since Vibonese finished more than 8 points ahead of Cavese, the relegation play-out was not played and Cavese were relegated directly.)	36	6	18	12	34	37	−3	36	
17	Paganese (O)	36	7	11	18	26	49	−23	32	Qualification to the relegation play-outs
18	Bisceglie (R)	36	7	9	20	28	51	−23	30	Qualification to the relegation play-outs
19	Cavese (R)	36	5	8	23	27	55	−28	23	Relegation to Serie D
20	Trapani (Note: Trapani had 1 point deducted for deserting home match against Casertana, then they were excluded from league after failing to attend a second consecutive match.) (D)	0	0	0	0	0	0	0	−1	Excluded and disbanded

Source: Lega Pro (in Italian), Soccerway (in English)
Rules for classification: 1) Points; 2) Head-to-head points; 3) Head-to-head goal difference; 4) Goal difference; 5) Goals scored; 6) Lower goals against; 7) Wins; 8) Lower losses; 9) Away wins; 10) Lower home losses.
(C) Champions; (D) Disqualified; (O) Play-off winners; (P) Promoted; (R) Relegated

== Promotion play-offs ==
A total of 28 teams qualified for the promotion play-offs. The winner of the play-offs earns promotion to Serie B.

=== First preliminary round ===
The fixtures pair the 5th vs 10th, 6th vs 9th and 7th vs 8th-placed teams. In the group with the best 4th-placed team, the 5th placed team advances automatically to the second preliminary round and the revised fixtures are 6th vs 11th, 7th vs 10th and 8th vs 9th. If teams are tied after regular time, the higher-placed team advances.

Matches were played on 9 May 2021. The Triestina vs Virtus Verona game, originally scheduled to be played on 9 May 2021, was delayed due to eight cases of COVID-19 infection involving the latter club. Match was later played on 16 May 2021.

Team 1	Score	Team 2
Pro Patria	1–3	Juventus U23
Lecco	1–4	Grosseto
AlbinoLeffe	1–0	Pontedera
Triestina	0–1	Virtus Verona
Cesena	2–1	Mantova
Matelica	3–1	Sambenedettese
Juve Stabia	1–1	Casertana
Catania	1–3	Foggia
Palermo	2–0	Teramo

=== Second preliminary round ===
The fixtures pair the 4th-placed team vs the worst-placed team and the best-placed team vs the 2nd best-placed team from the first preliminary round. The best 4th-placed team in regular season advances automatically to the first national round and their berth is transferred to the 5th-placed team of the same group. If teams are tied after regular time, the higher-placed team advances.

Matches were played on 19 May 2021.

Team 1	Score	Team 2
Pro Vercelli	1–0	Juventus U23
AlbinoLeffe	2–1	Grosseto
Feralpisalò	1–1	Virtus Verona
Cesena	2–3	Matelica
Bari	3–1	Foggia
Juve Stabia	0–2	Palermo

=== First national round ===
The three 3rd-placed teams, the best 4th-placed team and the best-placed team from the second preliminary round (Bari) are seeded and host the second leg. No away goal rule applies. If teams are tied on aggregate, the seeded team advances.

The draw for the first national round was held on 20 May 2021, 11:00 CEST (UTC+2). The first legs were played on 23 May 2021 and the second legs were played on 26 May 2021.

Team 1	Agg.	Team 2	1st leg	2nd leg
Matelica	2–2	Renate	1–1	1–1
Pro Vercelli	3–3	Südtirol	2–1	1–2
Palermo	1–1	Avellino	1–0	0–1
AlbinoLeffe	2–1	Modena	0–1	2–0
Feralpisalò	1–0	Bari	1–0	0–0

=== Second national round ===
The three 2nd-placed teams and the best-placed team from the first national round (Südtirol) are seeded and host the second leg. No away goal rule applies. If teams are tied on aggregate, the seeded team advances.

The draw for the second national round was held on 27 May 2021, 11:00 CEST (UTC+2). The first legs were played on 30 May 2021 and the second legs were played on 2 June 2021.

Team 1	Agg.	Team 2	1st leg	2nd leg
Feralpisalò	1–1	Alessandria	1–0	0–1
Renate	4–4	Padova	1–3	3–1
AlbinoLeffe	2–1	Catanzaro	1–1	1–0
Avellino	2–1	Südtirol	2–0	0–1

=== Final Four ===
No away goal rule applies. If teams are tied on aggregate, the winner is decided by extra-time and a penalty shootout if required.

The draw for Final Four was held on 27 May 2021, 11:00 CEST (UTC+2), after the second national round draw. The semi-finals legs were played on 6 and 9 June 2021 and the final legs were played on 13 and 17 June 2021.

Semi-finals
Padova	1	1	2
Avellino	1	0	1
AlbinoLeffe	1	2	3
Alessandria (a.e.t.)	2	2	4

Final
Padova	0	0	0 (4)
Alessandria (p)	0	0	0 (5)

Alessandria promoted to Serie B.

== Relegation play-outs ==
A total of 6 teams qualified for the relegation play-outs. The fixtures pair the 16th vs 19th and 17th vs 18th-placed teams, with higher-placed team playing at home for second leg. No away goal rule applies. If teams are tied on aggregate, the lower-placed team is relegated to Serie D.

The first legs were played on 15 May 2021 and the second legs were played on 22 May 2021. The Fano vs Imolese game was postponed due to a cluster of confirmed COVID-19 cases involving the former team. Match was played on 22 May 2021, whilst the second leg was played on 29 May 2021.

Team 1	Agg.	Team 2	1st leg	2nd leg
Ravenna	0–4	Legnago	0–1	0–3
Fano	1–1	Imolese	0–0	1–1
Bisceglie	4–4	Paganese	2–1	2–3

== Top goalscorers ==
Rank	Player	Club	Goals
1	(Italy) Jacopo Manconi^{3}	AlbinoLeffe	18
1	(Italy) Anthony Partipilo	Ternana	18
3	(Italy) Daniele Casiraghi^{3}	Südtirol	17
3	(Uruguay) César Falletti	Ternana	17
5	(Italy) Mattia Bortolussi	Cesena	16
6	(Italy) Filippo Guccione	Mantova	15
7	(Italy) Mirco Antenucci	Bari	14
7	(Italy) Luigi Cuppone	Casertana	14
7	(Italy) Alessio Curcio^{1}	Foggia	14
7	(Italy) Massimiliano Gatto	Como	14
7	(Italy) Andrea Magrassi	Pontedera	14
7	(Italy) Daniele Ragatzu	Olbia	14
7	(Italy) Fabio Scarsella^{1}	Feralpisalò	14
7	(Italy) Emilio Volpicelli	Matelica	14

Note

^{1} Player scored 1 goal in the play-offs.
^{3} Player scored 3 goals in the play-offs.

== Supercup ==
Perugia |2–1 |Como |Stadio Renato Curi, Perugia

Como |0–3 |Ternana |Stadio Giuseppe Sinigaglia, Como

Ternana |1–0 |Perugia |Stadio Libero Liberati, Terni

Ternana won with 6 points at the top of the group
