= Dalena =

Dalena is a surname. Notable people with the surname include:

- Kiri Dalena (born 1975), Filipino artist, filmmaker, and human rights activist
- Pete Dalena (born 1960), American baseball player

== See also ==
- Antonio D'Alena (born 1998), Italian footballer
