= Antonio D'Alena =

Italian footballer (born 1998)

Personal information
- Date of birth: 24 February 1998 (age 28)
- Place of birth: Mottola, Italy
- Height: 1.75 m (5 ft 9 in)
- Position: Midfielder

Team information
- Current team: Cosenza

Youth career
- –2012: Lecce
- 2012–2016: Roma
- 2016: → Frosinone (loan)
- 2016–2018: Torino

Senior career*
Years	Team	Apps	(Gls)
2018–2019	Torino	0	(0)
2018–2019	→ Renate (loan)	2	(0)
2019–2022	Imolese	62	(1)
2022–2023	Lucchese	29	(0)
2023–2026	Casarano	78	(1)
2026–	Cosenza	0	(0)
- * Club domestic league appearances and goals as of 1 May 2026

Antonio D'Alena (born 24 February 1998) is an Italian professional footballer who plays as a midfielder for Serie C Group C club Cosenza.

== Club career ==
=== Torino ===
==== Loan to Renate ====
On 17 July 2018, D'Alena was loaned to Serie C club Renate on a season-long loan deal. On 29 July he made his debut for Renate as a substitute replacing Andrea Doninelli in the 63rd minute of a 2–0 home defeat against A.C.Rezzato in the first round of Coppa Italia. On 16 September he made his Serie C debut for Renate as a substitute replacing Lorenzo Simonetti in the 79th minute of a 2–0 away win over Sambenedettese. In October 2018, D'Alena suffered an anterior cruciate ligament injury, he was in recovery until July 2019. D'Alena ended his loan to Renate with only 3 appearances, all as a substitute.

=== Imolese ===
On 24 July 2019, D'Alena signed for Serie C club Imolese on an undisclosed fee and a 3-year contract with a buy-buck option in favour of Torino. On 4 August he made his debut for the club in a match won 4–3 at penalties after a 3–3 home draw against Sambenedettese in the first round of Coppa Italia, he played the entire match. Three weeks later, on 25 September, he made his league debut for Imolese as a substitute replacing Andrea Marcucci in the 61st minute of a 2–1 away defeat against Rimini. However, in September 2019, he has to undergo a meniscus cleaning operation. He returned in June 2020 as a substitute replacing Gabriele Ingrosso in the 80th minute of a 2–1 away win over Arzignano Valchiampo. On 21 October, D'Alena played his first match as a starter for the club in Serie C, a 1–1 home draw against Sambenedettese, he was replaced by Lorenzo Alboni after 66 minutes.

=== Lucchese ===
On 9 August 2022, D'Alena signed a one-year contract, with an option to extend, with Lucchese.

== Career statistics ==
=== Club ===
As of 31 October 2020

Club	Season	League			Cup		Europe		Other		Total	
Club	Season	League	Apps	Goals	Apps	Goals	Apps	Goals	Apps	Goals	Apps	Goals
Renate (loan)	2018–19	Serie C	2	0	1	0	—		—		3	0
Imolese	2019–20	Serie C	1	0	2	0	—		2 (Note: All appearance(s) in Serie C play-out.)	0	5	0
Imolese	2020–21	Serie C	3	0	0	0	—		—		3	0
Career total			6	0	3	0	—		2	0	11	0

== Honours ==
=== Club ===
Torino Primavera

- Campionato Nazionale Primavera: 2015–16
