= Francesco Rodio =

Italian footballer

Personal information
- Date of birth: 5 April 2001 (age 25)
- Place of birth: Crotone, Italy
- Height: 1.70 m (5 ft 7 in)
- Position: Midfielder

Team information
- Current team: Poggibonsi
- Number: 15

Youth career
- –2020: Crotone

Senior career*
Years	Team	Apps	(Gls)
2020–2021	Crotone	1	(0)
2020–2021	→ Pro Vercelli (loan)	1	(1)
2021	→ Fano (loan)	11	(0)
2021–2024	Pro Vercelli	29	(1)
2021–2022	→ Fermana (loan)	23	(0)
2022–2023	→ Viterbese (loan)	21	(0)
2024–2025	Acireale	24	(2)
2025–	Poggibonsi	16	(0)
- * Club domestic league appearances and goals as of 22 February 2026

Francesco Rodio (born 5 April 2001) is an Italian footballer who plays as a midfielder for Serie D club Poggibonsi.

== Club career ==
On 17 September 2020 he joined Pro Vercelli on loan. On 1 February 2021 he was sent on a new loan to Fano.

On 5 July 2021, he returned to Pro Vercelli on a permanent basis. On 31 August 2021, he was loaned to Fermana. On 1 September 2022, Rodio moved on a new loan to Viterbese.

== Club statistics ==
=== Club ===
As of match played 19 December 2021

Club	Season	League			Cup		Other		Total	
Club	Season	Division	Apps	Goals	Apps	Goals	Apps	Goals	Apps	Goals
Crotone	2019–20	Serie B	1	0	0	0	-		1	0
Crotone	2020–21	Serie A	0	0	0	0	-		0	0
Crotone	Total		1	0	0	0	0	0	1	0
Pro Vercelli (loan)	2020–21	Serie B	1	1	0	0	-		1	1
Fano (loan)	2020–21	Serie C	11	0	-		2 (Note: Appearance(s) in Relegation Playoffs)	0	13	0
Pro Vercelli	2021–22	Serie C	0	0	-		-		0	0
Fermana (loan)	2021–22	Serie C	12	0	-		-		12	0
Career total			25	1	0	0	2	0	27	1
