= Andrea Marcucci (footballer) =

Italian footballer (born 1999)

Personal information
- Date of birth: 7 February 1999 (age 27)
- Place of birth: Rome, Italy
- Height: 1.73 m (5 ft 8 in)
- Position: Midfielder

Team information
- Current team: Real Monterotondo

Youth career
- –2019: Roma

Senior career*
| Years | Team | Apps | (Gls) |
| 2018–2019 | Roma | 0 | (0) |
| 2019 | Foggia | 1 | (0) |
| 2019–2020 | Imolese | 26 | (0) |
| 2020–2022 | Reggina | 0 | (0) |
| 2021 | → Virtus Entella (loan) | 6 | (0) |
| 2021–2022 | → Latina (loan) | 10 | (0) |
| 2022 | → Pistoiese (loan) | 15 | (0) |
| 2022–2023 | Montevarchi | 18 | (0) |
| 2023–2024 | Portici | 30 | (2) |
| 2024 | L'Aquila | 0 | (0) |
| 2024 | Chieri | 3 | (1) |
| 2024–2025 | Trestina | 14 | (1) |
| 2025– | Real Monterotondo | 14 | (0) |

International career^{‡}
| 2014 | Italy U15 | 5 | (0) |
| 2014–2015 | Italy U16 | 15 | (0) |
| 2015–2016 | Italy U17 | 18 | (0) |
| 2016–2017 | Italy U18 | 7 | (1) |
| 2017–2018 | Italy U19 | 14 | (1) |
| 2018–2019 | Italy U20 | 5 | (0) |
- * Club domestic league appearances and goals as of 1 March 2026 ‡ National team caps and goals as of 27 March 2019

Andrea Marcucci (born 7 February 1999) is an Italian footballer who plays as a midfielder for Serie D club Real Monterotondo.

== Club career ==
=== Roma ===
He is a product of Rome youth teams and represented the squad in the 2016–17 UEFA Youth League and 2017–18 UEFA Youth League.

He made his debut for Roma's senior squad on 11 July 2017 in a pre-season friendly against Pinzolo Van Rendena.

He also appeared on the bench for Roma on two occasions in the 2017–18 Serie A and 2018–19 Serie A seasons.

=== Foggia ===
On 31 January 2019, he signed with Serie B club Foggia.

He made his Serie B debut for Foggia on 1 March 2019 in a game against Cosenza, as a 62nd-minute substitute for Cristian Galano.

=== Imolese ===
On 24 July 2019, he signed a one-year contract with Serie C club Imolese.

=== Reggina ===
On 5 October 2020, he moved to Serie B club Reggina on a three-year contract. He did not appear for Reggina in the first half of the 2020–21 season, remaining on the bench. On 29 January 2021, he joined Virtus Entella on loan until June 2022. On 12 August 2021, Virtus Entella reached an agreement with Latina on a sub-loan of Marcucci, with the agreement of Reggina. On 31 January 2022, Reggina arranged a new loan for Marcussi to Pistoiese. On 31 August 2022, Marcucci's contract with Reggina was terminated by mutual consent.

=== Montevarchi ===
On 31 August 2022, Marcucci signed with Montevarchi in Serie C.

== International career ==
He was first called up to represent his country with the Under-15 squad in March 2014 and subsequently represented Italy at every age level up to Under-20 team.

He participated in the 2016 UEFA European Under-17 Championship with the Under-17 team (Italy did not advance from the group stage).

He played in the 2018 UEFA European Under-19 Championship, where Italy was the runners-up to Portugal. He provided the assist in extra time in the final to Gianluca Scamacca's equalizing goal, but Portugal scored again later to win the game 4–3.
