= Simone Raffini =

Italian footballer

Personal information
- Date of birth: 28 December 1996 (age 29)
- Place of birth: Castel San Pietro Terme, Italy
- Height: 1.85 m (6 ft 1 in)
- Position: Forward

Team information
- Current team: Piacenza
- Number: 9

Youth career
- –2012: Imolese
- 2012–2013: → Cesena (loan)
- 2013–2015: Cesena

Senior career*
Years	Team	Apps	(Gls)
2015–2016	Cesena	1	(0)
2016–2018	Pordenone	15	(0)
2017	→ Lucchese (loan)	20	(1)
2018	→ Pontedera (loan)	13	(1)
2018–2020	Ravenna	55	(5)
2020–2021	Fermana	16	(0)
2021	→ Paganese (loan)	17	(1)
2021–2022	Athletic Carpi	37	(12)
2022–2023	Roma City	42	(12)
2023–2025	Imolese	51	(19)
2025–2026	Vado	34	(16)
2026–	Piacenza	0	(0)
- * Club domestic league appearances and goals as of 25 June 2026

Simone Raffini (born 28 December 1996) is an Italian football player who plays for Serie D club Piacenza.

== Club career ==
He made his Serie B debut for Cesena on 11 October 2015 in a game against Cagliari.

On 11 September 2020 he signed a 2-year contract with Fermana. On 27 January 2021, he joined Paganese on loan. On 24 August 2021, his contract with Fermana was terminated by mutual consent. He subsequently joined Athletic Carpi in Serie D.
