= Lorenzo Valeau =

Italian footballer

Personal information
- Date of birth: 5 March 1999 (age 27)
- Place of birth: Rome, Italy
- Height: 1.80 m (5 ft 11 in)
- Positions: Left-back; midfielder

Youth career
- 2014–2018: Roma

Senior career*
Years	Team	Apps	(Gls)
2017–2021	Roma	0	(0)
2018–2019	→ Ascoli (loan)	0	(0)
2019	→ Catania (loan)	6	(0)
2019–2020	→ Imolese (loan)	27	(1)
2020–2021	→ Casertana (loan)	6	(0)
2021	→ Fano (loan)	7	(1)
2021–2022	Seregno	19	(1)
2022–2023	Chiasso	2	(1)

International career^{‡}
2015	Italy U16	4	(0)
2016	Italy U18	2	(0)
2017–2018	Italy U19	3	(0)
2018	Italy U20	1	(1)
- * Club domestic league appearances and goals as of 24 September 2022 ‡ National team caps and goals as of 8 August 2018

Lorenzo Valeau (born 5 March 1999) is an Italian footballer who plays as a left-back or midfielder.

== Club career ==
=== Roma ===
He is a product of Roma youth teams and started playing for their Under-19 squad in the 2016–17 season.

He made several appearances for the senior squad in summer 2017 in pre-season friendlies.

==== Loan to Ascoli ====
On 18 July 2018 he joined Serie B club Ascoli on a season-long loan with an option to buy. Early in his loan term, he suffered tibia fracture that took several months to heal. He was recalled from loan on 31 January 2019 without appearing on the field for Ascoli.

==== Loan to Catania ====
On 1 February 2019, he moved on another loan to Serie C club Catania.

He made his professional Serie C debut for Catania on 17 March 2019 in a game against Juve Stabia. He substituted Francesco Lodi in the 81st minute. He made his first (and only) starting lineup appearance on 3 April 2019 in a game against Viterbese. He finished his loan with 6 appearances.

==== Loan to Imolese ====
On 17 July 2019, he moved on another Serie C loan, to Imolese. He established himself as a starter for Imolese early in the season. He finished the loan with 31 appearances in all competitions.

==== Loan to Casertana ====
On 20 August 2020, he joined Casertana on loan, again in Serie C.

==== Loan to Fano ====
On 29 January 2021, he moved on loan to Fano.

=== Seregno ===
On 14 August 2021, he signed with Serie C club Seregno.

=== Chiasso ===
On 1 September 2022, Valeau joined Chiasso in the third-tier Swiss Promotion League.

== International ==
He was first called up to represent his country in 2015 for Under-16 squad friendlies.

He subsequently appeared in friendlies on the Under-18, Under-19 and Under-20 level.
