= Niccolò Belloni =

Italian footballer

Personal information
- Date of birth: 10 July 1994 (age 32)
- Place of birth: Carrara, Italy
- Height: 1.76 m (5 ft 9 1/2 in)
- Position: Midfielder

Team information
- Current team: Carrarese
- Number: 7

Youth career
- –2008: Spezia
- 2008–2013: Inter Milan

Senior career*
| Years | Team | Apps | (Gls) |
| 2013 | Inter Milan | 0 | (0) |
| 2013–2014 | Modena | 7 | (1) |
| 2014–2018 | Inter Milan | 0 | (0) |
| 2014–2015 | → Pro Vercelli (loan) | 35 | (2) |
| 2015–2016 | → Ternana (loan) | 20 | (2) |
| 2016–2017 | → Avellino (loan) | 30 | (1) |
| 2017–2018 | → Carpi (loan) | 11 | (0) |
| 2018–2021 | Arezzo | 60 | (7) |
| 2021–2022 | Lucchese | 33 | (6) |
| 2022–2023 | Siena | 34 | (3) |
| 2023– | Carrarese | 76 | (1) |

International career^{‡}
| 2012–2013 | Italy U19 | 6 | (1) |
| 2013 | Italy U20 | 1 | (0) |
- * Club domestic league appearances and goals as of 13 May 2026 ‡ National team caps and goals as of 27 May 2018

Niccolò Belloni (born 10 July 1994) is an Italian footballer who plays as a midfielder for Carrarese.

== Club career ==
=== Inter ===
Born in Carrara, Tuscany, Belloni played for nearby (35 km) team Spezia prior to joining Serie A club Inter Milan in 2008.

On 17 April 2013, Belloni came on as a late substitute replacing Andrea Ranocchia in the 87th minute in 2012–13 Coppa Italia semi-final loss against Roma to make his debut.

=== Modena ===
On 23 July 2013 he joined Serie B club Modena in a co-ownership deal. On 24 September he made his debut for Modena in Serie B in a match against Crotone, he enter as a substitute replacing Salvatore Molina in the 51st minute, after only 3 minute Belloni score his first and only goal for Modena in a 3–1 away defeat.

=== Return to Inter ===
In June 2014 Inter bought back Belloni.

==== Loan to Pro Vercelli ====
On 21 July 2014, Belloni was signed by Serie B club Pro Vercelli on loan. Belloni made his debut on 17 August in the second round of Coppa Italia, he was replaced by Abdouramane Coly in the 59th minute of a 2–1 away defeat against Brescia. He made his Serie B debut on 30 August, as a substitute, replacing Gianni Fabiano in the 66th minute in a 1–0 away defeat against Avellino. On 7 September he score his first goal for Pro Vercelli in the 72nd minute of a 3–2 home win over Catania. On 20 September, Belloni played his first entire match for Pro Vercelli, a 4–0 home win against Varese. On 13 December, Belloni score his second goal for the club and the winning goal in the 86th minute of a 1–0 away win against Crotone. Belloni ended his season-long loan to Pro Vercelli with 36 appearances, 2 goals and 1 assist.

==== Loan to Ternana ====
On 13 August 2015, Belloni was loaned to Serie B club Ternana with a season-long loan. On 21 September, Belloni made his debut, as a starter, and score his first goal with Ternana on in the 31st minute of a 3–2 home defeat against Livorno, he was replaced by Cesar Falletti in the 82nd minute. On 17 October, Belloni play his 50th professional match and score his second goal for Ternana in the 25th minute of a 3–0 win over Bari. Belloni ended his season-long loan to Ternana with 20 appearances and scoring 2 goals, but he never play an entire 90 minute match.

==== Loan to Avellino ====
On 1 July 2016, Belloni signed for Serie B club Avellino with a season-long loan. On 27 August, Belloni made his debut for Avellino, he was replaced by Daniele Verde in the 75th minute of a 1–1 away draw against Brescia. On 4 September, Belloni played his first full match for Avellino, a 2–0 away defeat against Virus Entella. On 17 September he score his first and only goal for Avellino in 3–1 away defeat against Hellas Verona. On 24 December, Belloni was sent off with a double yellow card in the 68th minute of a 3–2 home win over Salernitana. Belloni ended his loan to Avellino with 30 appearances, 1 goal and 1 assist.

==== Loan to Carpi ====
On 31 August 2017 he signed with Serie B club Carpi with a season-long loan. On 19 September, Belloni made his debut for Carpi, as a starter, in a 3–1 home defeat against Foggia in Serie B, he was replaced by Fabio Concas in the 51st minute. Belloni ended his loan to Carpi with only 11 appearances, all in the first part of the season and he never played an entire match in this loan.

=== Arezzo ===
On 21 August 2018, Belloni moved to Serie C club Arezzo on permanent deal.

=== Lucchese ===
On 30 August 2021, he joined Lucchese on a one-year deal.

=== Siena ===
On 21 July 2022, Belloni signed a multi-year contract with Siena.

== International career ==
Belloni represented Italy at Under 19 and Under 20 level, he collect a total of 7 caps at young level. On 13 September 2012 he made his U19 debut in an international friendly against Portugal U19 in a 1–1 away draw, he was replacing by Roberto Inglese in the 46th minute. On 12 October 2012, Belloni score his first and only international goal in a 3–0 win over Albania U19 during the UEFA European U19 Championship qualification. On 20 November 2013, Belloni made his U20 debut in an international friendly, he replaced Matteo Ricci in the 74th minute in a 5–0 win over Iran U20.

== Career Statistics ==
=== Club ===
As of match played 20 February 2022

Appearances and goals by club, season and competition
| Club | Season | League | | | National cup | | League cup | | Other | | Total | |
| Club | Season | League | Apps | Goals | Apps | Goals | Apps | Goals | Apps | Goals | Apps | Goals |
|---|---|---|---|---|---|---|---|---|---|---|---|---|
| Internazionale | 2012–13 | Serie A | 0 | 0 | 1 | 0 | — | | — | | 1 | 0 |
| Modena | 2013–14 | Serie B | 7 | 1 | 0 | 0 | — | | 1 (Note: Appearance(s) in Promotion Playoffs) | 0 | 8 | 1 |
| Pro Vercelli (loan) | 2014–15 | Serie B | 35 | 2 | 1 | 0 | — | | — | | 36 | 2 |
| Ternana (loan) | 2015–16 | Serie B | 20 | 2 | 0 | 0 | — | | — | | 20 | 2 |
| Avellino (loan) | 2016–17 | Sreie B | 30 | 1 | 0 | 0 | — | | — | | 30 | 1 |
| Carpi (loan) | 2017–18 | Serie B | 11 | 0 | 0 | 0 | — | | — | | 11 | 0 |
| Arezzo | 2018–19 | Serie C | 19 | 0 | 0 | 0 | — | | 4 | 1 | 23 | 1 |
| Arezzo | 2019–20 | Serie C | 25 | 4 | 2 | 2 | 1 | 0 | — | | 28 | 6 |
| Arezzo | 2020–21 | Serie C | 16 | 3 | 1 | 1 | — | | — | | 17 | 4 |
| Arezzo | Club total | | 60 | 7 | 3 | 3 | 1 | 0 | 4 | 1 | 68 | 11 |
| Lucchese | 2021–22 | Serie C | 23 | 3 | — | | — | | — | | 23 | 3 |
| Career total | | | 186 | 16 | 5 | 3 | 1 | 0 | 5 | 1 | 197 | 20 |
