= Luca Maniero =

Luca Maniero is the name of:

- Luca Maniero (footballer, born 1995), Italian football goalkeeper
- Luca Maniero (footballer, born 1998), Italian football midfielder
