= Cassio Cardoselli =

Italian football player (born 1998)

Personal information
- Date of birth: 26 July 1998 (age 28)
- Place of birth: Rome, Italy
- Height: 1.78 m (5 ft 10 in)
- Position: Midfielder

Team information
- Current team: Poggibonsi
- Number: 18

Youth career
- –2017: Lazio

Senior career*
Years	Team	Apps	(Gls)
2017–2020	Carrarese	81	(7)
2020–2022	Entella	15	(1)
2021–2022	→ Siena (loan)	34	(3)
2022–2024	Virtus Francavilla	24	(3)
2024	Sorrento	0	(0)
2024	Cassino		
2024–2026	Albalonga	15	(2)
2026–	Poggibonsi	2	(0)
- * Club domestic league appearances and goals as of 22 February 2026

Cassio Cardoselli (born 26 July 1998) is an Italian footballer who plays as a midfielder for Serie D club Poggibonsi.

== Club career ==
=== Carrarese ===
On 3 September 2017, Cardoselli made his professional debut as a substitute replacing Francesco Tavano in the 89th minute of a 1–0 home win over Pro Piacenza. On 17 September, Cardoselli played his first match as a starter, a 3–0 home win over Olbia, he was replaced by Daniel Kofi Agyei in the 82nd minute. On 26 November he played his first entire match for Carrarese, a 4–1 home win over Pontedera. On 24 March 2018, Cardoselli scored his first professional goal, as a substitute, in the 92nd minute of a 2–0 away win over Pisa. Cardoselli ended his first professional season with 30 appearances, 1 goal and 2 assists.

=== Entella ===
On 20 August 2020 he signed for Serie B side Virtus Entella. On 12 August 2021, he was loaned to Siena.

=== Virtus Francavilla ===
On 1 September 2022, Cardoselli joined Virtus Francavilla.

=== Sorrento ===
On 9 August 2024, Cardoselli moved to Sorrento.

== Career statistics ==
=== Club ===
As of match played 3 April 2022

Club	Season	League			Cup		Europe		Other		Total	
Club	Season	League	Apps	Goals	Apps	Goals	Apps	Goals	Apps	Goals	Apps	Goals
Carrarese	2017–18	Serie C	28	1	0	0	—		2 (Note: Appearance(s) in Promotion Playoffs)	0	30	1
Carrarese	2018–19	Serie C	26	0	0	0	—		4	1	30	1
Carrarese	2019–20	Serie C	27	6	2	0	—		2	0	31	6
Carrarese	Total		81	7	2	0	—		8	1	91	8
Entella	2020–21	Serie B	15	1	3	1	—		—		18	2
Siena (loan)	2021–22	Serie C	31	3	—		—		—		31	3
Career total			127	11	5	1	—		8	1	140	13
