= Andrea Di Grazia =

Italian footballer (born 1996)

Personal information
- Full name: Francesco Andrea Di Grazia
- Date of birth: 8 May 1996 (age 30)
- Place of birth: Catania, Italy
- Height: 1.75 m (5 ft 9 in)
- Position: Winger

Team information
- Current team: Nissa
- Number: 19

Youth career
- 2013–2015: Catania

Senior career*
Years	Team	Apps	(Gls)
2015–2019	Catania	70	(12)
2015–2016	→ Akragas (loan)	16	(4)
2019–2022	Pescara	12	(0)
2021	→ Arezzo (loan)	11	(1)
2021–2022	→ Foggia (loan)	9	(0)
2022–2024	Potenza	60	(10)
2024–2025	Siracusa	25	(5)
2025–2026	Reggina	33	(5)
2026–	Nissa	0	(0)
- * Club domestic league appearances and goals as of 30 September 2026

Francesco Andrea Di Grazia (born 8 May 1996) is an Italian footballer who plays as a winger for Serie D club Nissa.

== Career ==
Coming through the youth teams and impressing at youth level during the 2014–2015 season scoring 17 goals in 28 games, he was promoted to the first team for the 2015–2016 season. At the age of 19, he was loaned out to Italian club Akragas. Di Grazia impressed in his first professional season whilst at the Sicilian club netting 4 goals and 2 assists in 16 games despite the majority of his playing time coming from the bench. In the 2016–2017 season, Di Grazia established himself as a regular for Catania and as one of the hottest prospects in the lower leagues of Italian football. He repaid the faith shown in him by the team by contributing 8 goals and 4 assists in 32 games.

In 2019 he joined Pescara.

On 13 January 2021 he went to Arezzo on loan.

On 31 August 2021 he joined Foggia on a new loan.
