= Mirko Miceli =

Italian footballer (born 1991)

Personal information
- Date of birth: 16 June 1991 (age 35)
- Place of birth: Cosenza, Italy
- Height: 1.86 m (6 ft 1 in)
- Position: Defender

Team information
- Current team: Novara
- Number: 58

Youth career
- –2009: Catania
- 2009–2010: Union SG
- 2010–2011: Varese
- 2012–2013: Varese

Senior career*
Years	Team	Apps	(Gls)
2010–2011	Varese	1	(0)
2011–2012	Alessandria	5	(0)
2012	→ Carrarese (loan)	0	(0)
2012–2014	Varese	0	(0)
2013	→ Valle d'Aosta (loan)	14	(1)
2014	RapalloBogliasco	14	(2)
2014–2017	Olbia	64	(5)
2017	Viterbese	13	(1)
2017–2020	Sambenedettese	79	(6)
2020–2021	Avellino	30	(0)
2021–2023	Virtus Francavilla	49	(1)
2023–2024	Turris	27	(0)
2024	→ Taranto (loan)	16	(0)
2024	Taranto	0	(0)
2024–2026	Monopoli	51	(3)
2026	Catania	13	(0)
2026–	Novara	1	(0)
- * Club domestic league appearances and goals as of 22 August 2026

Mirko Miceli (born 16 June 1991) is an Italian professional footballer who plays as a defender for Serie C Group A club Novara.

== Club career ==
He made his Serie B debut for Varese on 2 April 2011 in a game against Cittadella.

On 27 August 2020 he signed a 2-year contract with Avellino.

On 18 August 2021 he joined Virtus Francavilla.

On 10 January 2023, Miceli moved to Turris. On 16 January 2024, he was loaned by Taranto, with an option to buy. At the end of the loan, Taranto exercised the option and signed a two-year contract with Miceli.
