= Michele Vano =

Italian footballer

Personal information
- Date of birth: 5 October 1991 (age 35)
- Place of birth: Rome, Italy
- Height: 1.90 m (6 ft 3 in)
- Position: Forward

Team information
- Current team: Turris

Senior career*
Years	Team	Apps	(Gls)
2009–2011	Astrea	33	(3)
2011	Luco	14	(0)
2011–2012	Isernia	15	(2)
2012–2013	Ceccano		(14)
2013–2014	Terracina	29	(7)
2014–2015	Chieti	8	(2)
2015–2017	Ostia Mare	54	(20)
2017–2018	Arzachena	32	(8)
2018–2020	Carpi	37	(10)
2020–2021	Hellas Verona	0	(0)
2020–2021	→ Mantova (loan)	13	(0)
2021	→ Perugia (loan)	11	(1)
2021–2023	Perugia	0	(0)
2021–2022	→ Pistoiese (loan)	35	(11)
2022–2023	→ Rimini (loan)	33	(4)
2023–2024	Monterosi	30	(9)
2024–2025	Avellino	12	(1)
2025–2026	Casertana	43	(5)
2026–	Turris	0	(0)
- * Club domestic league appearances and goals as of 1 May 2026

Michele Vano (born 5 October 1991) is an Italian professional footballer who plays as a forward for Serie D club Turris.

== Club career ==
Vano spent the first eight seasons of his career in the fourth and fifth tier teams (Serie D and Eccellenza).

On 15 July 2017, he joined Arzachena, which was just promoted into the third-tier Serie C. He made his Serie C debut for Arzachena on 3 September 2017 in a game against Viterbese. He came on as a substitute in 28th minute for Giancarlo Lisai and scored his first goal on fully professional level just four minutes later.

On 19 June 2018, he went up another level, joining Serie B club Carpi on a three-year contract.

On 5 October 2020, Carpi sold his rights to Hellas Verona, who immediately loaned him to Mantova.

On 5 January 2021, he moved to Perugia on loan with a conditional obligation to buy. The condition for the purchase obligation was fulfilled and Perugia purchased his rights.

On 28 August 2021 he joined Pistoiese on loan from Perugia. On 27 August 2022, Vano was loaned to Rimini.

On 24 July 2024, Vano signed with Avellino for one season, with a conditional option to extend.

== Honours ==
=== Individual ===
- 2019–20 Coppa Italia Top goal scorers: four goals, shared with Gianluca Scamacca
