= Luca Maniero (footballer, born 1998) =

Italian footballer

Personal information
- Date of birth: 11 July 1998 (age 28)
- Place of birth: Padua, Italy
- Height: 1.76 m (5 ft 9 in)
- Position: Midfielder

Youth career
- Cittadella

Senior career*
Years	Team	Apps	(Gls)
2016–2021	Cittadella	7	(0)
2019–2020	→ Imolese (loan)	16	(0)
2021–2024	Adriese	106	(11)
2024–2025	Union Clodiense	15	(0)
- * Club domestic league appearances and goals as of 4 January 2025

Luca Maniero (born 11 July 1998) is an Italian footballer who plays as a midfielder.

== Club career ==
He made his professional debut in the Serie B for Cittadella on 3 September 2016 in a game against Ternana.

On 3 August 2019, he joined Imolese on loan.
