= Gianluca Scamacca =

Italian footballer (born 1999)

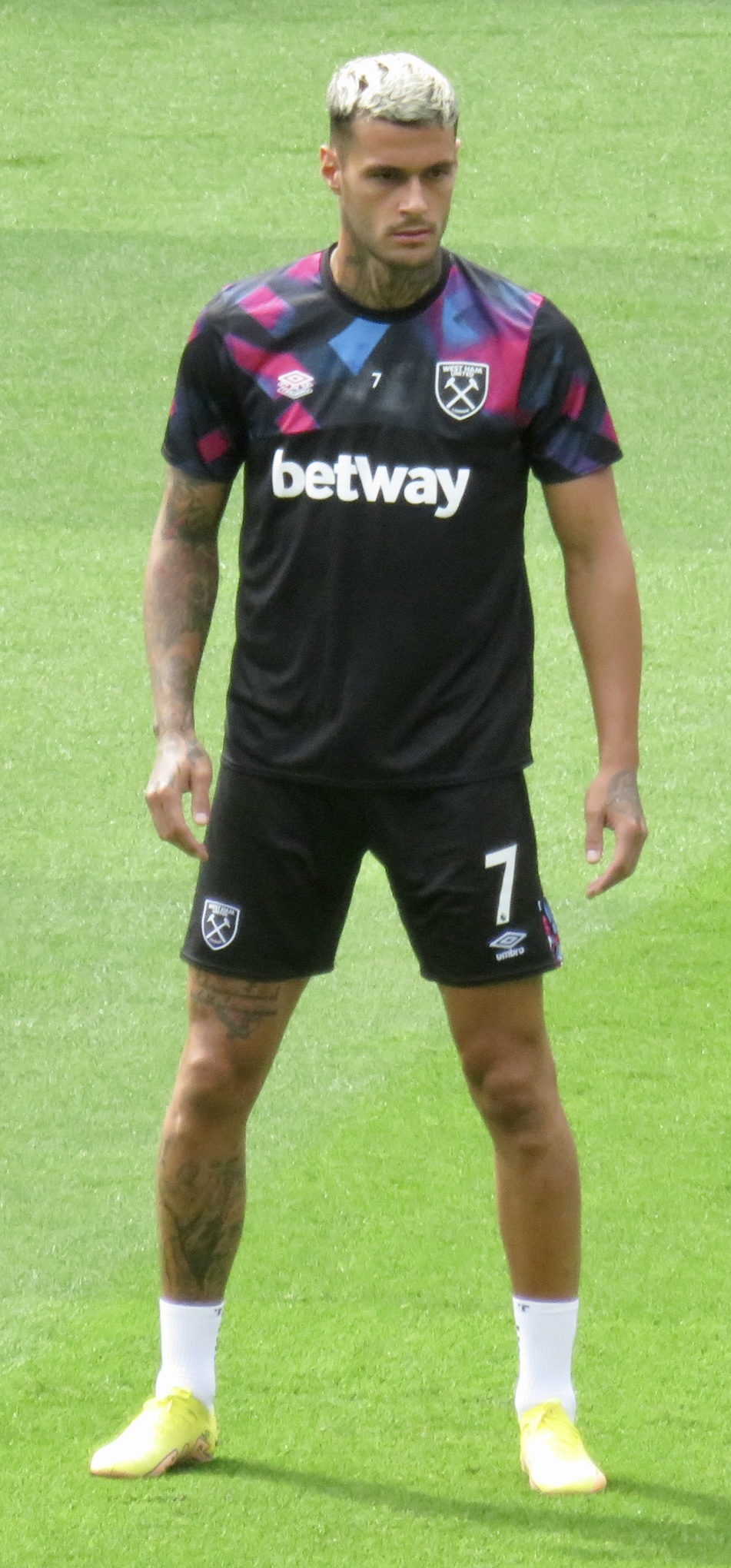
- Scamacca with West Ham United in 2022

Personal information
- Full name: Gianluca Scamacca
- Date of birth: 1 January 1999 (age 27)
- Place of birth: Rome, Italy
- Height: 1.96 m (6 ft 5 in)
- Position: Striker

Team information
- Current team: Atalanta
- Number: 9

Youth career
- 2009–2012: Lazio
- 2012–2015: Roma
- 2015–2017: PSV

Senior career*
Years	Team	Apps	(Gls)
2016–2017	Jong PSV	3	(0)
2017–2022	Sassuolo	39	(16)
2018	→ Cremonese (loan)	14	(1)
2018–2019	→ PEC Zwolle (loan)	8	(0)
2019–2020	→ Ascoli (loan)	33	(9)
2020–2021	→ Genoa (loan)	26	(8)
2022–2023	West Ham United	16	(3)
2023–	Atalanta	59	(23)

International career^{‡}
2014–2016	Italy U17	28	(6)
2016–2017	Italy U18	4	(3)
2017–2018	Italy U19	11	(8)
2018–2019	Italy U20	12	(5)
2018–2021	Italy U21	15	(9)
2021–	Italy	26	(2)
Medal record
Men's football
Representing Italy
CONMEBOL–UEFA Cup of Champions
Runner-up	2022 England
UEFA European Under-19 Championship
Runner-up	2018 Finland
- * Club domestic league appearances and goals as of 21:06, 15 October 2026 (UTC) ‡ National team caps and goals as of 22:45, 12 November 2026 (UTC)

Gianluca Scamacca (born 1 January 1999) is an Italian professional footballer who plays as a striker for Serie A club Atalanta and the Italy national team.

Scamacca previously played for Jong PSV, Sassuolo and West Ham United, with loans at Cremonese, PEC Zwolle, Ascoli and Genoa. He made his senior international debut for Italy in 2021.

== Club career ==
=== Early career ===
A product of the youth academies of Lazio and Roma, Scamacca joined PSV Eindhoven in January 2015. He made his professional debut in Eerste Divisie as a Jong PSV player on 22 January 2016, aged 17, in a 2–1 away win against VVV-Venlo, replacing Steven Bergwijn after 61 minutes.

=== Sassuolo ===
In January 2017, he was signed by Italian club Sassuolo on a four-and-a-half-year deal. On 29 October, at age 18, he made his Serie A debut in a 3–1 loss against Napoli at the Stadio San Paolo, coming on as a substitute for Diego Falcinelli in the 85th minute.

==== Loans to Cremonese, PEC Zwolle, Ascoli and Genoa ====
In January 2018, Scamacca joined Serie B club Cremonese on loan. He scored his first professional goal on 14 April 2018, in the league match against Palermo.

On 31 August 2018, Scamacca joined Eredivisie club PEC Zwolle on loan. He made his debut on 2 September 2018 in the away league match won 1–0 against Groningen.

On 13 July 2019, he joined Serie B club Ascoli on loan.

On 2 October 2020, Scamacca joined Genoa in the Serie A on a season-long loan.

==== Return to Sassuolo ====
In summer 2021, Scamacca returned to Sassuolo, coached by Alessio Dionisi. On 17 October, he scored his first goals with the neroverdi, scoring a brace in an away game against his former team, Genoa, helping his side draw 2–2. During the 2021–22 season, he played as a starter alongside Domenico Berardi and Giacomo Raspadori in attack, and ended the season with 16 league goals. He made his last appearance to the club on 22 May 2022 in a 3–0 loss to AC Milan.

=== West Ham United ===
On 26 July 2022, Scamacca signed for Premier League club West Ham United on a five-year contract with an option for a further year. The transfer fee paid to Sassuolo was reportedly of £30.5 million, with an additional £5 million in add-ons. A 10% sell-on clause for the Italian team was also reportedly included in the deal.

Scamacca made his West Ham and Premier League debut coming on as a second-half substitute for Michail Antonio in a 2–0 home defeat to Manchester City on 7 August 2022. His first goal for West Ham came in his third game, on 18 August, in the play-off round of the UEFA Conference League against Viborg; he scored the first goal of an eventual 3–1 win. He scored his first league goal for the club in a 2–0 home win over Wolverhampton Wanderers on 1 October 2022. He scored only three Premier League goals and, due to a knee injury which required surgery, did not feature for the club after March 2023, thus missing their 2023 UEFA Europa Conference League final win. He spent only a single season at West Ham, scoring eight goals in 27 appearances, including five in West Ham's run to win the UEFA Europa Conference League.

=== Atalanta ===
Scamacca joined Atalanta on a permanent deal on 7 August 2023. The reported fee was an initial £22.5 million plus a further £4.3 million in add-ons. On 2 September, he scored a brace in a 3–0 victory over Monza, his first goals for the club. On 11 April 2024, in Atlanta's 3–0 Europa League quarter-final first leg victory, Scamacca became the first Italian to score a brace against Liverpool at Anfield. On 24 April, Scamacca scored a goal and set-up another (in addition to having a second goal disallowed) to help overturn a 1–0 deficit from the first leg of the Coppa Italia semi-finals, eventually beating out Fiorentina 4–2 on aggregate to advance to the final against Juventus. On 2 May, he scored the opening goal in a 1–1 away draw against Marseille in the first leg of the Europa League semi-finals. On 22 May, Scamacca started in Atalanta's 3–0 victory over Bayer Leverkusen in the 2024 Europa League final at the Dublin Arena, setting up Ademola Lookman's third goal of the match.

In early August 2024, he sustained a serious ACL injury which would sideline him for months.

== International career ==
=== Youth ===
As a member of the Italy U17 side, Scamacca took part at the 2015 and 2016 editions of the UEFA European Under-17 Championship.

With Italy U19, Scamacca took part in the 2018 UEFA European Under-19 Championship, and scored two goals in the tournament, including one in the 4–3 final loss against Portugal after extra time. The following year he took part at the 2019 FIFA U-20 World Cup with the Italy U20 squad, finishing in fourth place.

On 25 May 2018, Scamacca made his debut with the Italy U21 team in a friendly match lost 3–2 against Portugal. He scored his first goal with the Italy U21 team on 6 September 2019, in a friendly match won 4–0 against Moldova. He took part in the 2021 UEFA European Under-21 Championship, where he scored two goals.

=== Senior ===
He received his first call up to the senior Italy squad for the team's 2022 FIFA World Cup qualifiers in September 2021. He made his senior debut on 8 September, in a 5–0 home win over Lithuania, coming on as a second–half substitute for Federico Bernardeschi.

Scamacca scored his first senior international goal on 17 October 2023, in Italy's 3–1 UEFA Euro 2024 qualifying loss to England at Wembley Stadium.

== Style of play ==
Scamacca is a tall, right-footed centre-forward, with an eye for goal, who is known for his explosive physical strength, and powerful shot, which allows him to score goals from both inside and outside the penalty area, even from acrobatic first–time shots. Despite his size, he is a technical player, who possesses flair and a good first touch, and is known for his tendency to drop deep, move freely about the attacking third, and link-up with his teammates, which sees him operate almost as a second striker at times, rather than as a traditional striker who mainly operates inside the box. As such, he has occasionally been used in a role which is known as the centravanti di manovra in Italian football jargon, which is comparable to the modern false nine role, with Scamacca seemingly playing as a lone striker, but often dropping deep to participate in the build-up of attacking plays. While effective in the air and at holding up the ball, due to his height and powerful physique, his aerial game has been cited as being in need of improvement by pundits, something which Scamacca himself has admitted, as he prefers to play the ball on the ground; he was able to improve his aerial game during his time at Atalanta under manager Gian Piero Gasperini. Although he is not gifted with significant pace, he is mobile for a player of his size. Scamacca has cited former strikers Zlatan Ibrahimović and Gabriel Batistuta as some of his inspirations, and has even been compared to the former player by pundits due to his physique and playing style. Once considered to be a promising player in the media, in 2016, he was named one of the "60 of the best young talents in world football" by The Guardian in 2016.

== Career statistics ==
=== Club ===
As of match played 15 October 2026

Appearances and goals by club, season and competition
Club	Season	League			National cup (Note: Includes Coppa Italia, KNVB Cup, FA Cup)		League cup (Note: Includes EFL Cup)		Europe		Other		Total	
Club	Season	Division	Apps	Goals	Apps	Goals	Apps	Goals	Apps	Goals	Apps	Goals	Apps	Goals
Jong PSV	2015–16	Eerste Divisie	2	0	—		—		—		—		2	0
Jong PSV	2016–17	Eerste Divisie	1	0	—		—		—		—		1	0
Jong PSV	Total		3	0	—		—		—		—		3	0
Sassuolo	2017–18	Serie A	3	0	—		—		—		—		3	0
Sassuolo	2021–22	Serie A	36	16	2	0	—		—		—		38	16
Sassuolo	Total		39	16	2	0	—		—		—		41	16
Cremonese (loan)	2017–18	Serie B	14	1	—		—		—		—		14	1
PEC Zwolle (loan)	2018–19	Eredivisie	8	0	2	0	—		—		—		10	0
Ascoli (loan)	2019–20	Serie B	33	9	2	4	—		—		—		35	13
Genoa (loan)	2020–21	Serie A	26	8	3	4	—		—		—		29	12
West Ham United	2022–23	Premier League	16	3	1	0	1	0	9 (Note: Appearances in UEFA (Europa) Conference League)	5	—		27	8
Atalanta	2023–24	Serie A	29	12	4	1	—		11 (Note: Appearances in UEFA Europa League)	6	—		44	19
Atalanta	2024–25	Serie A	1	0	0	0	—		0	0	0	0	1	0
Atalanta	2025–26	Serie A	24	10	4	1	—		10 (Note: Appearances in UEFA Champions League)	3	—		38	14
Atalanta	2026–27	Serie A	5	1	0	0	—		3	2	—		8	3
Atalanta	Total		59	23	8	2	—		24	11	0	0	91	36
Career total			198	60	18	10	1	0	33	16	0	0	250	86

=== International ===
As of match played 12 November 2026

Appearances and goals by national team and year
National team	Year	Apps	Goals
Italy	2021	2	0
Italy	2022	7	0
Italy	2023	6	1
Italy	2024	5	0
Italy	2025	2	0
Italy	2026	4	1
Total		26	2

Italy score listed first, score column indicates score after each Scamacca goal.

List of international goals scored by Gianluca Scamacca
No.	Date	Venue	Cap	Opponent	Score	Result	Competition	Ref.
1	17 October 2023	Wembley Stadium, London, England	13	England	1–0	1–3	UEFA Euro 2024 qualifying	
2	5 October 2026	Stadio Renato Dall'Ara, Bologna, Italy	25	Turkey	1–0	3–1	2026–27 UEFA Nations League A	

== Honours ==
West Ham United

- UEFA Europa Conference League: 2022–23

Atalanta

- UEFA Europa League: 2023–24

Italy U19

- UEFA European Under-19 Championship runner-up: 2018

Individual

- Coppa Italia top goalscorer: 2019–20 (4 goals, shared with Michele Vano), 2020–21 (4 goals)
- Serie A Goal of the Month: October 2023
