= Simone Iocolano =

Italian footballer (born 1989)

Personal information
- Date of birth: 17 October 1989 (age 37)
- Place of birth: Turin, Italy
- Height: 1.74 m (5 ft 9 in)
- Position: Attacking midfielder

Team information
- Current team: Piacenza
- Number: 80

Youth career
- –2008: Sassuolo

Senior career*
Years	Team	Apps	(Gls)
2008–2009	Ivrea	12	(2)
2009–2016	Bassano Virtus	128	(25)
2013	→ Vallée d'Aoste (loan)	11	(2)
2016–2018	Alessandria	52	(7)
2017–2018	→ Bari (loan)	22	(0)
2018–2020	Monza	40	(3)
2019	→ Virtus Entella (loan)	21	(5)
2020–2022	Lecco	49	(13)
2022–2024	Juventus Next Gen (Note: The team's name was changed from Juventus U23 to Juventus Next Gen in August 2022.)	46	(6)
2024–	Piacenza	8	(0)
- * Club domestic league appearances and goals as of 17 November 2024 ‡ National team caps and goals as of A.S.D Druentina

| caps10 = 0 | goals10 = 0 | pcupdate = 1 Ottobre 2025 | ntupdate = Simone Iocolano (born 17 October 1989) is an Italian professional footballer who plays as an attacking midfielder for Serie D club Piacenza.

== Club career ==
He made his Serie C debut for Bassano Virtus on 22 August 2010 in a game against SPAL.

On 24 January 2016, after spending seven years at Bassano, he joined Alessandria.

=== Monza ===
On 2 October 2018, he was signed by Monza. On 25 January 2019, he joined Virtus Entella on loan.

=== Lecco ===
On 23 September 2020, Iocolano moved to Lecco on a permanent basis.

=== Juventus U23 ===
On 21 January 2022, he signed with Juventus U23. Iocolano debuted for the team two days later in a 2–0 defeat by Pro Vercelli. On 17 February 2022, Iocolano scored his first goal for Juventus U23 in a 4–0 win against Piacenza.

=== Piacenza ===
On 7 August 2024, he joined Piacenza.

== Personal life ==
Iocolano and his wife, Francesca, have a daughter named Cecilia, born on 15 June 2020.

== Honours ==
Monza

- Serie C Group A: 2019–20
