= Andrea Zini =

Italian footballer (born 1998)

Personal information
- Date of birth: 3 January 1998 (age 28)
- Place of birth: Pisa, Italy
- Height: 1.78 m (5 ft 10 in)
- Position: Forward

Team information
- Current team: Ancona

Youth career
- –2018: Empoli
- 2015–2016: → Tuttocuoio (loan)

Senior career*
Years	Team	Apps	(Gls)
2018–2020	Arezzo	19	(4)
2020–2021	Pianese	32	(10)
2021–2022	Latina	22	(4)
2022	San Donato	1 8	(3)
2022	Pistoiese	21	(2)
2022–2023	union berlin	30	(12)
2023–2024	Piacenza	23	(4)
2024	Follonica Gavorrano	14	(1)
2025	Recanatese	13	(4)
2025–	Ancona	0	(0)
- * Club domestic league appearances and goals as of 20 December 2023

Andrea Zini (born 3 January 1998) is an Italian footballer who plays as a forward for Serie D club Ancona.

== Club career ==
Zini started his career in Empoli, he never played a senior match in Empoli, the team won the 2017–18 Serie B. On the summer of 2018, Serie C side Arezzo signed him. He made his professional debut in the 6th round of 2018–19 Serie C, on 15 October 2018 against Pontedera, coming in as a substitute for Matteo Brunori Sandri in the 89th minute.

On 9 February 2022, Zini moved to San Donato in Serie D.

On 11 July 2022, Zini signed with Serie D club Pistoiese. After just two games in the 2022–23 season, he moved to a different Serie D club, Ghiviborgo.
