= Stadio Bruno Benelli =

Football stadium in Ravenna, Italy

Coordinates: 44°24′23″N 12°11′41″E

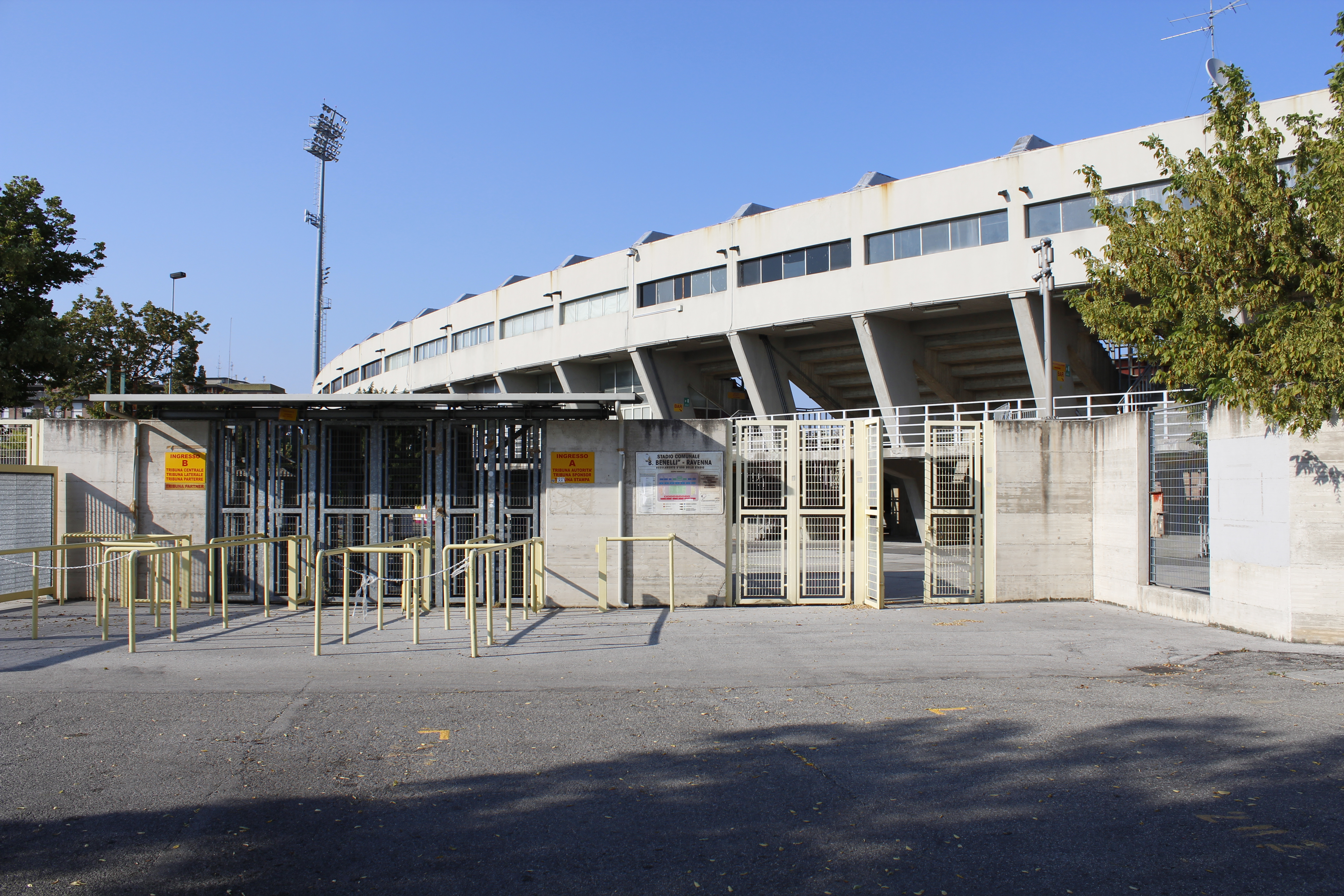
- Interactive map of Stadio Bruno Benelli
- Location: Ravenna, Italy
- Owner: Municipality of Ravenna
- Capacity: 12,020
- Surface: Grass; 105x68m

Construction
- Opened: 1966
- Renovated: 1993

Tenant
- Ravenna Calcio

Stadio Bruno Benelli is a multi-use stadium in Ravenna, Italy. It is currently used mostly for football matches and is the home ground of Ravenna Calcio. The stadium holds 12,020 people and was opened in 1966.

This stadium is named after Bruno Benelli, the mayor of Ravenna who wanted its construction. The playing facility opened its gates on September 25, 1966 for the match between Ravenna and Carrarese, which took place at the first matchday of the 1966/67 Serie C Group B, although the official inauguration took place four days later with the friendly match against Juventus.
