= Fabio Scarsella =

Italian footballer

Personal information
- Date of birth: 19 July 1989 (age 37)
- Place of birth: Alatri, Italy
- Height: 1.85 m (6 ft 1 in)
- Position: Midfielder

Team information
- Current team: Giulianova
- Number: 23

Youth career
- –2009: Frosinone

Senior career*
| Years | Team | Apps | (Gls) |
| 2009 | Frosinone | 1 | (0) |
| 2009–2010 | Sangiustese | 28 | (1) |
| 2010–2012 | Melfi | 57 | (3) |
| 2012–2013 | Martina Franca | 29 | (3) |
| 2013–2015 | Vigor Lamezia | 68 | (14) |
| 2015–2016 | Catania | 18 | (3) |
| 2016–2018 | Cremonese | 44 | (10) |
| 2018 | → Trapani (loan) | 17 | (4) |
| 2018–2021 | Feralpisalò | 94 | (33) |
| 2021–2022 | Modena | 34 | (13) |
| 2022–2024 | Vicenza | 25 | (4) |
| 2024 | Monterosi | 11 | (1) |
| 2024–2025 | Pergolettese | 30 | (2) |
| 2025– | Giulianova | 10 | (1) |
- * Club domestic league appearances and goals as of 4 January 2026

Fabio Scarsella (born 19 July 1989) is an Italian footballer who plays as a midfielder for Serie D club Giulianova.

== Club career ==
He made his Serie B debut for Frosinone on 30 May 2009 in a game against Grosseto.

On 3 July 2021, he signed a two-year contract with Modena.

On 28 July 2022, Scarsella moved to Vicenza on a two-year deal. On 30 January 2024, Scarsella left Vicenza by mutual consent.

On 26 July 2024, Scarsella signed a two-season contract with Pergolettese.

During his play, in Italy, he was compared to Fabio Quagliarella like his similar sense of goal.

== Honours ==
=== Club ===
Cremonese

- Lega Pro: 2016–17
