= Zak Ruggiero =

English-born Italian footballer

Personal information
- Date of birth: 9 January 2001 (age 25)
- Place of birth: Bishop Auckland, England
- Height: 1.74 m (5 ft 9 in)
- Position: Forward

Team information
- Current team: Crotone
- Number: 83

Youth career
- –2019: Crotone

Senior career*
Years	Team	Apps	(Gls)
2019–2022	Crotone	2	(0)
2020–2021	→ Pro Vercelli (loan)	0	(0)
2021	→ Pro Sesto (loan)	7	(0)
2021–2022	→ Lucchese (loan)	9	(1)
2022–2025	Cerignola	79	(5)
2025–2026	Trapani	13	(1)
2025–2026	→ Cerignola (loan)	28	(3)
2026–	Crotone	2	(0)
- * Club domestic league appearances and goals as of 29 August 2026

Zak Ruggiero (born 9 January 2001) is an English-Italian professional footballer who plays as a forward for Serie C Group C club Crotone.

== Career ==
On 11 September 2019, Ruggiero signed his first professional contract with Crotone for a term of 5 years.

He made his Serie B debut for Crotone on 29 December 2019, in a game against Trapani. He came on in place of Junior Messias who was substituted in the 85th minute.

On 25 September 2020, Ruggiero was loaned to Serie C club Pro Vercelli. On 1 February 2021, he was sent on another loan to fellow Serie C side Pro Sesto.

On 31 August 2021, Ruggiero was loaned to Lucchese, again in Serie C.

On 26 July 2022, he signed for Cerignola.

== Personal life ==
His father, Giorgio Ruggiero, is Italian and his mother English. He was born in England but moved to Crotone a few months later.
