= Filippo Guccione =

Italian footballer

Personal information
- Date of birth: 8 November 1992 (age 34)
- Place of birth: Ostiglia, Italy
- Height: 1.78 m (5 ft 10 in)
- Position: Winger

Team information
- Current team: Pescara

Senior career*
Years	Team	Apps	(Gls)
2010–2012	Cerea	31+	(12)
2012–2013	Casale	16	(2)
2013–2014	Bassano	16	(1)
2014–2015	Delta Porto Tolle	7	(0)
2015	AC Oppeano	?	(6)
2015–2017	AC Vigasio	29+	(27)
2017–2019	Pro Sesto	63	(26)
2019–2023	Mantova	125	(42)
2023–2026	Arezzo	100	(15)
2026–	Pescara	0	(0)
- * Club domestic league appearances and goals as of 26 April 2026

Filippo Guccione (born 8 November 1992) is an Italian professional footballer who plays as a winger for Serie C Group B club Pescara.

== Club career ==
Guccione started his career in Cerea. He played two Serie C season, for Casale and Bassano. Between 2014 and 2020 he played on Serie D, winning the promotion with Delta Porto Tolle on 2014–15 season.

On 12 July 2019, he joined to Mantova. He was named captain of the team.

In June 2023, Guccione signed a two-year contract with Arezzo.
