= Cristian Ventola =

Italian footballer (born 1997)

Personal information
- Date of birth: 15 May 1997 (age 29)
- Place of birth: Ortona, Italy
- Height: 1.70 m (5 ft 7 in)
- Position: Defender

Team information
- Current team: Chieti

Youth career
- –2016: Pescara

Senior career*
Years	Team	Apps	(Gls)
2015–2021	Pescara	7	(0)
2016–2017	→ Maceratese (loan)	37	(2)
2017–2018	→ Teramo (loan)	27	(2)
2018–2019	→ Teramo (loan)	31	(1)
2019–2020	→ Cittadella (loan)	3	(0)
2021	Arezzo	12	(0)
2021–	Chieti	1	(0)
- * Club domestic league appearances and goals as of 7 November 2021

Cristian Ventola (born 15 May 1997) is an Italian football player. He plays for Chieti.

== Club career ==
=== Pescara ===
On 8 April 2016, Ventola made his debut for Pescara, in Serie B, as a starter and played the full match, in a 3–1 away win over Avellino.

==== Loan to Maceratese ====
On 17 July 2016, Ventola was signed by Serie C side Maceratese on a season-long loan deal. On 30 July he made his debut for Maceratese, as a starter in the first round of Coppa Italia, in a match won at penalties 7–6 after a 3–3 draw against Campodarsego. On 3 September, Ventola made his Serie C debut for Maceratese, he was replaced by Karba Bangoura in the 80th minute of 2–1 home defeat against Sambenedettese, one week later he played his first full match in Serie C, a 0–0 away draw against Modena. On 24 September, Ventola scored his first professional goal in the 52nd minute of a 4–2 home defeat against Pordenone. On 26 November he scored his second goal in the 54th minute of a 1–1 home draw against Forlì. On 23 December he was sent off with a double yellow card in the 87th minute of a 0–0 home draw against AlbinoLeffe. Ventola ended his loan to Maceratese with 39 appearances, including 35 as a starter, and 2 goals.

==== Loan to Teramo ====
On 10 July 2017, Ventola was loaned by Serie C side Teramo on a season-long loan deal. On 27 August he made his debut in Serie C for Teramo, as a starter and playing the entire match in a 1–1 away draw against Mestre. On 8 November, Ventola scored his first goal for Teramo in the third minute of a 1–1 away draw against Triestina. On 9 December he scored his second goal in the 30th minute of a 2–1 home win over Fano. Ventola ended his season-long loan to Teramo with 27 appearances, all as a starter, 2 goals and 1 assist, all in Serie C.

On 21 August 2018, Ventola returned to Teramo with a new season-long loan. On 17 September he started his second season at Teramo with a 1–0 away defeat against Südtirol, he played the entire match. On 8 December he was sent-off with a red card in the 44th minute of a 1–1 away draw against Vicenza Virtus. On 20 April 2019, Ventola scored his first goal of the season in the 71st minute of a 2–1 home win over Vis Pesaro. Ventola ended his second season on loan at Teramo with 31 appearances, 1 goal and 2 assists.

==== Loan to Cittadella ====
After having played in the second and in the third round of Coppa Italia and scored 1 goal against Mantova, and played 1 match as a substitute in Serie B for Pescara against Salernitana, on 2 September 2019, Ventola joined Serie B club Cittadella on a season-long loan.

=== Arezzo ===
On 13 January 2021 he went to Arezzo.

=== Serie D ===
On 4 November 2021, he joined Chieti in Serie D.

== Career statistics ==
=== Club ===
As of 17 November 2019

Club	Season	League			Cup		Europe		Other		Total	
Club	Season	League	Apps	Goals	Apps	Goals	Apps	Goals	Apps	Goals	Apps	Goals
Pescara	2015–16	Serie B	1	0	0	0	—		—		1	0
Maceratese (loan)	2016–17	Serie C	37	2	2	0	—		—		39	2
Teramo (loan)	2017–18	Serie C	27	2	0	0	—		—		27	2
Teramo (loan)	2018–19	Serie C	31	1	0	0	—		—		31	1
Pescara	2019–20	Serie B	1	0	2	1	—		—		3	1
Cittadella (loan)	2019–20	Serie B	0	0	0	0	—		—		0	0
Career total			97	5	4	1	—		—		101	6
