= Imolese Calcio 1919 =

Italian football club

Imolese
- Full name: Imolese Calcio 1919
- Founded: 1919; 107 years ago
- Ground: Romeo Galli, Imola, Italy
- Capacity: 4,000
- Chairman: Giovanni Tarantino
- Manager: Gianni D'Amore
- League: Eccellenza Emilia-Romagna Group B
- 2025–26: Serie D Group D, 15th of 18 (relegated via play-out)
| Home colours | Away colours |

Imolese Calcio 1919 is a professional football club based in Imola, Emilia-Romagna, that currently plays in Eccellenza Emilia-Romagna. Their home pitch, Romeo Galli Stadium, is located inside the Autodromo Enzo e Dino Ferrari to the left of the curving frontstretch before the Variante Tamburello.

== History ==
=== Foundation ===
The club was founded in 1919 and would join the Italian Football Federation six years later. In 1929, it achieved promotion to the second division. In 1934, the club achieved promotion to the top flight. In 1936, just one year after promotion to the top division, the club refounded and began participation in Serie D.

For the next 40 or so years the club yoyoed between the third and fifth divisions. In the 1989–90 season, they achieved promotion to Serie C2 (fourth division), but they were unable to promote due to financial difficulties.

In 2005, A.C. Imolese S.r.l. was expelled from 2005–06 Serie C2 due to financial irregularities. The club was refounded under the name Imolese Calcio 1919 S.s.d a r.l and was admitted to Eccellenza Emilia-Romagna (fifth tier). In the 2005–06 season Imolese was relegated to Promozione after finishing sixteenth in Emilia–Romagna Group B. The following season Imolese won the Promozione, and then returned to Eccellenza.

In the 2012–13 season, it won promotion to Serie D, winning against Giulianova in the play-off semi-final and San Colombano in the final. In the 2017–18 season the club achieved promotion to Serie C. That season they shortened their name to just Imolese Calcio 1919. In the 2018–19 season the club finished third in Serie C and qualified to the promotion playoffs but lost the playoff semi-final. However less than five years later the club was relegated back to Serie D.

== Colors and badge ==
The team's colors are red and blue, copied from those of the Imola commune.
