= List of Italian football transfers summer 2020 =

The 2020 Italian football summer transfer window ran from 1 September to 5 October 2020, due to the effects of the COVID-19 pandemic on the football calendar. This list includes transfers featuring at least one club from either Serie A or Serie B that were completed after the end of the winter 2019–20 transfer window on 31 January and before the end of the 2020 summer window on 5 October.

== Transfers ==
Legend

- Those clubs in Italic indicate that the player already left the team on loan on this or the previous season or a new signing that immediately left the club.

Date	Name	Moving from	Moving to	Fee
6 February 2020	(Denmark) Mikkel Damsgaard	(Denmark) Nordsjælland	Sampdoria	Undisclosed
6 February 2020	Luca Magnino	FeralpiSalò	Pordenone	Free
18 February 2020	(Germany) Emre Can	Juventus	(Germany) Borussia Dortmund	€25m (Note: The player already played for his new club in 2019–20 season, the deal turned from temporary to definitive.)
28 February 2020	(Spain) Carles Pérez	(Spain) Barcelona	Roma	€11m
28 February 2020	(France) Jordan Veretout	Fiorentina	Roma	Undisclosed
28 February 2020	Gianluca Mancini	Atalanta	Roma	Undisclosed
13 March 2020	(Poland) Adam Chrzanowski	(Poland) Lechia Gdańsk	Pordenone	Undisclosed
31 May 2020	(Argentina) Mauro Icardi	Internazionale	(France) Paris Saint-Germain	Undisclosed
9 June 2020	Andrea Barberis	Crotone	Monza	Undisclosed
11 June 2020	(Croatia) Adrian Šemper	(Croatia) Dinamo Zagreb	Chievo	Undisclosed
15 June 2020	(Netherlands) Delano Burgzorg	Spezia	(Netherlands) Heracles Almelo	Undisclosed
17 June 2020	Stefano Pettinari	Lecce	Trapani	Undisclosed
22 June 2020	(Croatia) Mario Pašalić	(England) Chelsea	Atalanta	Undisclosed
22 June 2020	(Greece) Giorgos Kyriakopoulos	(Greece) Asteras Tripolis	Sassuolo	Undisclosed
23 June 2020	(France) Jérémy Ménez	(France) Paris FC	Reggina	Free
28 June 2020	Stefano Gori	Pisa	Juventus U23	Undisclosed
28 June 2020	Leonardo Loria	Juventus U23	Pisa	Undisclosed
29 June 2020	Simone Muratore	Juventus U23	Atalanta	€7m
29 June 2020	(Bosnia and Herzegovina) Miralem Pjanić	Juventus	(Spain) Barcelona	€60m
29 June 2020	(Brazil) Arthur Melo	(Spain) Barcelona	Juventus	€72m
30 June 2020	(Spain) Pablo Moreno	Juventus	(England) Manchester City	€10.5m
30 June 2020	(Portugal) Félix Correia	(England) Manchester City	Juventus	€10.5m
30 June 2020	(Argentina) Facundo Colidio	Internazionale	(Belgium) Sint-Truidense	Loan
1 July 2020	(Belgium) Alexis Saelemaekers	(Belgium) Anderlecht	Milan	Undisclosed
1 July 2020	(Costa Rica) Joel Campbell	Frosinone	(Mexico) León	Undisclosed
2 July 2020	(Morocco) Achraf Hakimi	(Spain) Real Madrid	Internazionale	Undisclosed
6 July 2020	Luca Giudici	Monza	Lecco	Undisclosed
7 July 2020	(Belgium) Senna Miangué	Cagliari	(Belgium) Eupen	Loan
9 July 2020	(Kosovo) Valon Berisha	Lazio	(France) Reims	Undisclosed
15 July 2020	(Denmark) Simon Kjær	(Spain) Sevilla	Milan	Undisclosed
15 July 2020	Riccardo Meggiorini	Chievo	Vicenza	Free
20 July 2020	(Spain) Suso	Milan	(Spain) Sevilla	Undisclosed
21 July 2020	(Denmark) Jacob Rasmussen	Fiorentina	(Netherlands) Vitesse	Loan
22 July 2020	(Austria) Arnel Jakupović	Empoli	(Slovenia) Domžale	Undisclosed
22 July 2020	(Kosovo) Lirim Kastrati	Bologna	(Hungary) Újpest	Undisclosed
22 July 2020	(Denmark) Christian Gytkjær	(Poland) Lech Poznań	Monza	Undisclosed
24 July 2020	(Northern Ireland) Kyle Lafferty	(England) Sunderland	Reggina	Free
24 July 2020	(Slovakia) Filip Vasko	Udinese	(Slovakia) Zemplín Michalovce	Undisclosed
31 July 2020	(Nigeria) Victor Osimhen	(France) Lille	Napoli	Undisclosed
1 August 2020	(Czech Republic) David Heidenreich	Atalanta	(Czech Republic) Teplice	Loan
2 August 2020	(Slovakia) Dávid Hancko	Fiorentina	(Czech Republic) Sparta Prague	Loan
4 August 2020	(Czech Republic) Ladislav Krejčí	Bologna	(Czech Republic) Sparta Prague	Undisclosed
5 August 2020	(France) William Bianda	Roma	(Belgium) Zulte Waregem	Loan
5 August 2020	Stefano Parodi	Roma	Pontedera	Undisclosed
5 August 2020	Leonardo Stanzani	Bologna	Pontedera	Loan
5 August 2020	(France) Pierre Kalulu	(France) Lyon	Milan	Free
6 August 2020	(Chile) Alexis Sánchez	(England) Manchester United	Internazionale	Free
7 August 2020	(Croatia) Andrija Balić	Udinese	(Slovakia) Dunajská Streda	Undisclosed
7 August 2020	Andrea Boffelli	Atalanta	Pro Patria	Undisclosed
7 August 2020	Manuel Nocciolini	Parma	Sambenedettese	Loan
8 August 2020	(Belgium) Xian Emmers	Internazionale	(Netherlands) Almere City	Loan
8 August 2020	Aimone Calì	Atalanta	Viterbese	Undisclosed
9 August 2020	(Poland) Michał Marcjanik	Empoli	(Poland) Arka Gdynia	Undisclosed
11 August 2020	(Poland) Kamil Glik	Monaco	Benevento	Undisclosed
11 August 2020	(France) Maxime Gonalons	Roma	(Spain) Granada	Undisclosed
11 August 2020	Hamza El Kaouakibi	Bologna	Südtirol	Loan
11 August 2020	(Croatia) Mirko Marić	(Croatia) Osijek	Monza	Undisclosed
11 August 2020	Giacomo Tomaselli	Monza	AlbinoLeffe	Undisclosed
11 August 2020	(Brazil) Leandrinho	Napoli	(Brazil) Red Bull Bragantino	Undisclosed
11 August 2020	Vincenzo Silvestro	Hellas Verona	Mantova	Undisclosed
12 August 2020	Giulio Donati	Lecce	Monza	Undisclosed
12 August 2020	Ettore Marchi	Monza	Vis Pesaro	Undisclosed
12 August 2020	Camillo Tavernelli	Gubbio	Cittadella	Free
12 August 2020	(Slovenia) Žan Celar	Roma	Cremonese	Loan
13 August 2020	(England) Luis Binks	(Canada) Montreal Impact	Bologna	Undisclosed
13 August 2020	(England) Luis Binks	Bologna	(Canada) Montreal Impact	Loan
13 August 2020	(France) Blaise Matuidi	Juventus	(United States) Inter Miami	Free
13 August 2020	Valerio Mastrantonio	Monterosi	Cittadella	Undisclosed
13 August 2020	Luca Palesi	Monza	Pro Sesto	Undisclosed
13 August 2020	(Slovakia) Samuel Mráz	Empoli	(Poland) Zagłębie Lubin	Loan
14 August 2020	Matteo Rover	Internazionale	Südtirol	Undisclosed
14 August 2020	(Ghana) Bright Gyamfi	Benevento	Reggiana	Undisclosed
14 August 2020	Tommaso Merletti	Milan	Renate	Undisclosed
14 August 2020	(Sweden) Emil Roback	(Sweden) Hammarby	Milan	Undisclosed
16 August 2020	(Turkey) Kaan Ayhan	(Germany) Fortuna Düsseldorf	Sassuolo	Undisclosed
16 August 2020	(Netherlands) Reda Boultam	Cremonese	Triestina	Free
16 August 2020	(Greece) Georgios Vrakas	Napoli	(Greece) PAOK	Undisclosed
17 August 2020	Matteo Figoli	Spezia	Pergolettese	Loan
17 August 2020	Matteo Pinton	Hellas Verona	Mantova	Undisclosed
18 August 2020	Luca Germoni	Juve Stabia	Reggiana	Undisclosed
18 August 2020	Marco Curto	Empoli	Südtirol	Undisclosed
18 August 2020	(Ivory Coast) Seko Fofana	Udinese	(France) Lens	Undisclosed
18 August 2020	Emanuele Torrasi	Milan	Imolese	Undisclosed
18 August 2020	Matteo Gerbaudo	Juventus	Mantova	Undisclosed
18 August 2020	Gianmaria Zanandrea	Juventus	Mantova	Undisclosed
18 August 2020	Claudio Zappa	Juventus	Mantova	Undisclosed
18 August 2020	Mario Ierardi	Südtirol	Vicenza	Undisclosed
19 August 2020	(Switzerland) Ricardo Rodríguez	Milan	Torino	Undisclosed
19 August 2020	(Germany) Sinan Gümüş	Genoa	(Turkey) Fenerbahçe	Undisclosed
19 August 2020	(Croatia) Lorenco Šimić	Sampdoria	(Poland) Zagłębie Lubin	Undisclosed
19 August 2020	Lorenzo Crisetig	(Spain) Mirandés	Reggina	Free
19 August 2020	Nicolò Cambiaghi	Atalanta	Reggiana	Loan
19 August 2020	Lorenzo Migliorelli	Atalanta	Gubbio	Undisclosed
19 August 2020	Tommaso Cucchietti	Torino	Gubbio	Undisclosed
19 August 2020	Antonio Esposito	Frosinone	Renate	Undisclosed
19 August 2020	Leonardo Mazza	Bologna	Mantova	Loan
19 August 2020	Riccardo Tosi	Hellas Verona	Mantova	Undisclosed
19 August 2020	Paolo Cannistrà	SPAL	Cavese	Loan
19 August 2020	(Brazil) Daniel Fuzato	Roma	(Portugal) Gil Vicente	Loan
20 August 2020	Lorenzo Valeau	Roma	Casertana	Loan
20 August 2020	(Netherlands) Vicente Besuijen	Roma	(Netherlands) ADO Den Haag	Undisclosed
20 August 2020	Michele Cerofolini	Fiorentina	Reggiana	Loan
20 August 2020	Lorenzo Peli	Atalanta	Reggina	Loan
20 August 2020	Pasquale Giannotti	Crotone	Virtus Francavilla	Loan
20 August 2020	Alessio Militari	Bologna	Mantova	Undisclosed
20 August 2020	(Moldova) Artur Ioniță	Cagliari	Benevento	Undisclosed
20 August 2020	Cassio Cardoselli	Carrarese	Virtus Entella	Free
20 August 2020	Nicolas Oliveto	Juventus	Monopoli	Undisclosed
20 August 2020	Pietro Beruatto	Juventus	Vicenza	Loan
20 August 2020	Ivan Marconi	Monza	Palermo	Undisclosed
20 August 2020	Alfonso Pepe	Sampdoria	Paganese	Undisclosed
20 August 2020	(Austria) Michael Svoboda	(Austria) WSG Tirol	Venezia	Undisclosed
20 August 2020	(Austria) Valentino Lazaro	Internazionale	(Germany) Borussia Mönchengladbach	Undisclosed
21 August 2020	Kevin Cannavò	Empoli	Vis Pesaro	Loan
21 August 2020	Paolo Grillo	Sicula Leonzio	Cittadella	Free
22 August 2020	Andrea Colpani	Atalanta	Monza	2-year loan
22 August 2020	Luca Castiglia	Salernitana	Modena	Loan
22 August 2020	Tiziano Tulissi	Atalanta	Modena	Undisclosed
23 August 2020	Giuseppe Sibilli	AlbinoLeffe	Pisa	Undisclosed
23 August 2020	Pietro Ceccaroni	Spezia	Venezia	Undisclosed
24 August 2020	(Turkey) Mert Çetin	Roma	Hellas Verona	Loan
24 August 2020	Alessandro Crescenzi	Hellas Verona	Cremonese	Undisclosed
24 August 2020	(Greece) Dimitrios Stavropoulos	(Greece) Panionios	Reggina	Undisclosed
24 August 2020	(Belgium) Daam Foulon	(Belgium) Waasland-Beveren	Benevento	Undisclosed
24 August 2020	(Albania) Frédéric Veseli	Empoli	Salernitana	Undisclosed
24 August 2020	Matteo Brunori	Juventus	Virtus Entella	Loan
24 August 2020	Luca Gemello	Torino	Renate	Loan
24 August 2020	Salvatore Pezzella	Roma	Reggiana	Loan
24 August 2020	Giuseppe Zampano	Cesena	Reggiana	Free
25 August 2020	(Norway) Dennis Johnsen	(Netherlands) Ajax	Venezia	Undisclosed
25 August 2020	Gabriele Ferrarini	Fiorentina	Venezia	Loan
25 August 2020	Eyob Zambataro	Atalanta	Monopoli	Loan
25 August 2020	(Spain) Pedro	(England) Chelsea	Roma	Free
25 August 2020	Giorgio Galli	Monza	Lecco	Undisclosed
25 August 2020	Antonino Barillà	Parma	Monza	Undisclosed
25 August 2020	(Denmark) Nikolai Frederiksen	Juventus	(Austria) WSG Tirol	Loan
25 August 2020	Alessandro Rossi	Lazio	Viterbese	Loan
26 August 2020	Genny Rondinella	Savoia	Chievo	Undisclosed
26 August 2020	Giorgio Altare	Genoa	Olbia	Loan
26 August 2020	(Poland) Karol Linetty	Sampdoria	Torino	Undisclosed
26 August 2020	(Poland) Marcin Listkowski	(Poland) Pogoń Szczecin	Lecce	Undisclosed
26 August 2020	Massimo Coda	Benevento	Lecce	Free
26 August 2020	Matteo Salvi	Atalanta	Pistoiese	Loan
26 August 2020	Alessandro Siano	Juventus	Imolese	Undisclosed
26 August 2020	Enrico Alfonso	Brescia	Cremonese	Free
26 August 2020	(Albania) Aristidi Kolaj	Sassuolo	Pro Patria	Loan
26 August 2020	Clemente Crisci	Oasi San Feliciana	Salernitana	Loan
27 August 2020	Luigi Canotto	Juve Stabia	Chievo	Free
27 August 2020	Gianmarco Vannucchi	Salernitana	Padova	Undisclosed
27 August 2020	Emilio Volpicelli	Salernitana	Matelica	Undisclosed
27 August 2020	(Honduras) Rigoberto Rivas	Internazionale	Reggina	Loan
27 August 2020	(Portugal) Nuno Pina	Chievo	(Switzerland) Grasshopper	Loan
27 August 2020	(Spain) Pepe Reina	Milan	Lazio	Free
27 August 2020	Michele Di Gregorio	Internazionale	Monza	Loan
27 August 2020	(France) Anthony Taugourdeau	Trapani	Venezia	Undisclosed
27 August 2020	(Kosovo) Mërgim Vojvoda	(Belgium) Standard Liège	Torino	Undisclosed
28 August 2020	(Ghana) Nicholas Opoku	Udinese	(France) Amiens	Loan
28 August 2020	Luca Marrone	Hellas Verona	Crotone	Undisclosed
28 August 2020	(Switzerland) Kevin Rüegg	(Switzerland) Zürich	Hellas Verona	Undisclosed
28 August 2020	(Brazil) Carlos Augusto	(Brazil) Corinthians	Monza	Undisclosed
28 August 2020	Nunzio Lella	Cagliari	Olbia	Loan
28 August 2020	Roberto Biancu	Cagliari	Olbia	Loan
28 August 2020	Tommaso Farabegoli	Sampdoria	Vis Pesaro	Loan
28 August 2020	Andrea Tessiore	Sampdoria	Vis Pesaro	Loan
28 August 2020	Leonardo Benedetti	Sampdoria	Vis Pesaro	Loan
28 August 2020	Lorenzo Babbi	Atalanta	Piacenza	Loan
28 August 2020	Lorenzo Gavioli	Internazionale	FeralpiSalò	Loan
29 August 2020	(United States) Weston McKennie	(Germany) Schalke 04	Juventus	Loan
29 August 2020	Alessandro Russo	Sassuolo	Virtus Entella	Loan
29 August 2020	Marco Brescianini	Milan	Virtus Entella	Loan
29 August 2020	Wladimiro Falcone	Sampdoria	Cosenza	Loan
29 August 2020	Danilo Giacinto Ventola	Ascoli	Imolese	Loan
29 August 2020	Tommaso Cassandro	Bologna	Cittadella	Undisclosed
29 August 2020	Stefano Mazzini	Atalanta	Carrarese	Loan
29 August 2020	Marco Imperiale	Empoli	Carrarese	Loan
30 August 2020	Alessandro Bruno	Pescara	Casarano	Free
31 August 2020	Gabriel Lunetta	Atalanta	Reggiana	Loan
31 August 2020	Alessandro Eleuteri	Atalanta	Vis Pesaro	Undisclosed
31 August 2020	Matteo Pedrini	Atalanta	Grosseto	Loan
31 August 2020	(Brazil) Gabriel Brazão	Internazionale	(Spain) Oviedo	Loan
31 August 2020	Edoardo Pierozzi	Fiorentina	Pistoiese	Loan
31 August 2020	Federico Simonti	Fiorentina	Pistoiese	Loan
31 August 2020	(Netherlands) Kevin Diks	Fiorentina	(Denmark) AGF	Loan
31 August 2020	(Croatia) Ivor Pandur	(Croatia) Rijeka	Hellas Verona	Loan
31 August 2020	(Romania) Răzvan Marin	(Netherlands) Ajax	Cagliari	Loan
31 August 2020	(Armenia) Henrikh Mkhitaryan	(England) Arsenal	Roma	Free
1 September 2020	Guido Guerrieri	Lazio	Salernitana	Loan
1 September 2020	(Croatia) Karlo Butić	Torino	Pordenone	Undisclosed
1 September 2020	Matteo Rossetti	Torino	Pordenone	Undisclosed
1 September 2020	Luca Zanimacchia	Juventus	(Spain) Real Zaragoza	Loan
1 September 2020	Luca Ravanelli	Sassuolo	Cremonese	Loan
1 September 2020	Nicola Ravaglia	Cremonese	Sampdoria	Free
1 September 2020	Gabriele Gori	Fiorentina	Vicenza	Loan
1 September 2020	(Poland) Szymon Żurkowski	Fiorentina	Empoli	Loan
1 September 2020	(Serbia) Aleksa Terzić	Fiorentina	Empoli	Loan
1 September 2020	Marco Spina	SPAL	Vibonese	Undisclosed
1 September 2020	Federico Ermacora	Udinese	Carrarese	Loan
1 September 2020	Giorgio Losa	Atalanta	Piacenza	Undisclosed
1 September 2020	Nunzio Brandi	Hellas Verona	Turris	Loan
1 September 2020	Umberto Eusepi	Pisa	Alessandria	Undisclosed
1 September 2020	(Senegal) Franck Kanouté	Pescara	(Belgium) Cercle Brugge	Undisclosed
1 September 2020	Gianluca Barba	Monza	Pontedera	Undisclosed
1 September 2020	Giacomo Satalino	Sassuolo	Cesena	Loan
1 September 2020	Giuseppe Aurelio	Sassuolo	Cesena	Loan
2 September 2020	Giangiacomo Magnani	Sassuolo	Hellas Verona	Loan
2 September 2020	(Germany) Koray Günter	Genoa	Hellas Verona	Undisclosed
2 September 2020	Salvatore Caturano	Virtus Entella	Cesena	Undisclosed
2 September 2020	Gianluca Lapadula	Genoa	Benevento	Undisclosed
2 September 2020	Davide Voltan	Vis Pesaro	Reggiana	Undisclosed
2 September 2020	Andrea Brighenti	Monza	Juventus U23	Undisclosed
2 September 2020	Michele Franco	Monza	Pro Sesto	Undisclosed
2 September 2020	Filippo Perucchini	Empoli	Pistoiese	Undisclosed
3 September 2020	(France) Adrien Tameze	(France) Nice	Hellas Verona	Undisclosed
3 September 2020	(Serbia) Vladan Đekić	Pisa	Casertana	Loan
3 September 2020	Simone Muratore	Atalanta	Reggiana	Loan
3 September 2020	Matteo Rubin	Reggina	Alessandria	Loan
3 September 2020	Simone Corazza	Reggina	Alessandria	Undisclosed
3 September 2020	Antonio Candela	Genoa	Pergolettese	Loan
3 September 2020	Niccolò Corrado	Internazionale	Palermo	Loan
3 September 2020	(Argentina) Lisandro Magallán	(Netherlands) Ajax	Crotone	Loan
3 September 2020	Michael D'Eramo	Spezia	Vis Pesaro	Undisclosed
3 September 2020	(Senegal) Khouma Babacar	Sassuolo	(Turkey) Alanyaspor	2-year loan
3 September 2020	(Belgium) Timothy Castagne	Atalanta	(England) Leicester City	Undisclosed
3 September 2020	(Germany) Idrissa Touré	Juventus	(Netherlands) Vitesse	Loan
3 September 2020	(Netherlands) Thomas Ouwejan	(Netherlands) AZ Alkmaar	Udinese	Loan
3 September 2020	Marco Pinato	Sassuolo	Cremonese	Loan
4 September 2020	Cristian Buonaiuto	Perugia	Cremonese	Undisclosed
4 September 2020	(Russia) Aleksei Miranchuk	(Russia) Lokomotiv Moscow	Atalanta	Undisclosed
4 September 2020	(Austria) Markus Pavic	(Croatia) Istra	Virtus Entella	Free
4 September 2020	(Spain) Brahim Díaz	(Spain) Real Madrid	Milan	Loan
4 September 2020	(Greece) Orestis Karnezis	Napoli	(France) Lille	Undisclosed
4 September 2020	(France) Gabriel Charpentier	(Latvia) Spartaks	Genoa	Undisclosed
4 September 2020	Mattia Perin	Juventus	Genoa	Loan
4 September 2020	Gianluca Caprari	Sampdoria	Benevento	Loan
4 September 2020	(Senegal) Khadim Ndiaye	Atalanta	Ascoli	Loan
4 September 2020	Alessandro Mallamo	Atalanta	Pordenone	Loan
5 September 2020	Luca Valzania	Atalanta	Cremonese	Loan
5 September 2020	Andrea Palazzi	Monza	Palermo	Loan
5 September 2020	Jacopo Sala	SPAL	Calcio	Free
5 September 2020	(France) Ihsan Sacko	(France) Nice	Cosenza	Loan
5 September 2020	(Argentina) Cristian Romero	Juventus	Atalanta	2-year loan
5 September 2020	(Brazil) Allan	Napoli	(England) Everton	Undisclosed
5 September 2020	(Serbia) Miloš Vulić	(Serbia) Red Star Belgrade	Crotone	Undisclosed
6 September 2020	Mattia Trovato	Fiorentina	AlbinoLeffe	Loan
6 September 2020	(Sweden) Lukas Björklund	(Sweden) Malmö	Milan	Undisclosed
7 September 2020	Mattia Destro	Bologna	Genoa	Free
7 September 2020	(Croatia) Stipe Perica	Udinese	(England) Watford	Undisclosed
7 September 2020	Matteo Di Gennaro	Livorno	Reggiana	Free
7 September 2020	Luca Paganini	Frosinone	Lecce	Free
7 September 2020	Davide Bertolini	Empoli	Prato	Loan
7 September 2020	Gianlorenzo Lupi	Empoli	Poggibonsi	Loan
7 September 2020	Niccolò Vivoli	Empoli	Pistoiese	Loan
7 September 2020	Alex Sposito	Empoli	Taranto	Loan
8 September 2020	Mirko Valdifiori	SPAL	Pescara	Free
8 September 2020	Alessandro Arlotti	Monaco	Pescara	Free
8 September 2020	(Colombia) Damir Ceter	Cagliari	Pescara	Loan
8 September 2020	Gabriele Zappa	Pescara	Cagliari	Loan
8 September 2020	Alessio Riccardi	Roma	Pescara	Loan
8 September 2020	(Serbia) Aleksandar Kolarov	Roma	Internazionale	€1.5m
8 September 2020	(Czech Republic) Patrik Schick	Roma	(Germany) Bayer Leverkusen	€26.5m
8 September 2020	Nicola Dalmonte	Genoa	Vicenza	Loan
8 September 2020	Francesco Golfo	Parma	Juve Stabia	Loan
8 September 2020	Fernando Forestieri	(England) Sheffield Wednesday	Udinese	Free
8 September 2020	Luca Cigarini	Cagliari	Crotone	Free
8 September 2020	Andrea Rispoli	Lecce	Crotone	Undisclosed
8 September 2020	(Netherlands) Jeroen Zoet	(Netherlands) PSV Eindhoven	Spezia	Undisclosed
8 September 2020	(Nigeria) Theophilus Awua	Spezia Calcio	Cittadella	Loan
9 September 2020	Sandro Tonali	Brescia	Milan	Loan
9 September 2020	Cristiano Piccini	(Spain) Valencia	Atalanta	Loan
9 September 2020	(Germany) Lennart Czyborra	Atalanta	Genoa	2-year loan
9 September 2020	(Chile) Francisco Sierralta	Udinese	(England) Watford	Undisclosed
9 September 2020	(Serbia) Ivan Ilić	(England) Manchester City	Hellas Verona	Loan
9 September 2020	Federico Dimarco	Internazionale	Hellas Verona	Loan
9 September 2020	Marco Olivieri	Juventus	Empoli	Loan
9 September 2020	Luca Gagliano	Cagliari	Olbia	Loan
9 September 2020	Salvatore Burrai	Pordenone	Perugia	Undisclosed
9 September 2020	Nicola Falasco	Perugia	Pordenone	Undisclosed
10 September 2020	(Chile) Luis Rojas	Universidad de Chile	Crotone	Undisclosed
10 September 2020	(Brazil) Eduardo	(Portugal) Sporting CP	Crotone	Loan
10 September 2020	Emanuele Valeri	Cesena	Cremonese	Undisclosed
10 September 2020	Luca Vido	Atalanta	Pisa	Loan
10 September 2020	Marco Varnier	Atalanta	Pisa	Loan
10 September 2020	Riccardo Sottil	Fiorentina	Cagliari	Loan
10 September 2020	Giacomo Bonaventura	Milan	Fiorentina	Free
10 September 2020	(Portugal) André Silva	Milan	(Germany) Eintracht Frankfurt	Undisclosed
10 September 2020	(Hungary) András Schäfer	Genoa	(Slovakia) Dunajská Streda	Undisclosed
10 September 2020	(Belgium) Stéphane Oméonga	Genoa	Pescara	Undisclosed
11 September 2020	(Brazil) Felipe Estrella	(Brazil) Ferroviária	Genoa	Undisclosed
11 September 2020	Alessandro Florenzi	Roma	(France) Paris Saint-Germain	Loan
11 September 2020	(Nigeria) Ola Aina	Torino	(England) Fulham	Loan
11 September 2020	Federico Marigosu	Cagliari	Olbia	Loan
11 September 2020	Cristian Dell'Orco	Sassuolo	Spezia	Loan
11 September 2020	Riccardo Marchizza	Sassuolo	Spezia	Loan
11 September 2020	Luca Sparandeo	Benevento	Virtus Francavilla	Loan
11 September 2020	Marco Cuccurullo	Benevento	Cavese	Loan
11 September 2020	(Scotland) Liam Henderson	Hellas Verona	Lecce	Undisclosed
11 September 2020	(Slovenia) Jure Balkovec	Hellas Verona	(Turkey) Fatih Karagümrük	Free
11 September 2020	Enrico Del Prato	Hellas Verona	Reggina	Undisclosed
11 September 2020	Davide Diaw	Cittadella	Pordenone	Undisclosed
11 September 2020	Raffaele Celia	Sassuolo	Alessandria	Loan
11 September 2020	Jacopo Pellegrini	Sassuolo	Gubbio	Loan
11 September 2020	(Uruguay) Emiliano Gómez	Sassuolo	(Spain) Albacete Balompié	Loan
11 September 2020	(Norway) Rafik Zekhnini	Fiorentina	(Switzerland) Lausanne-Sport	Loan
11 September 2020	(Martinique) Emmanuel Rivière	Cosenza	Crotone	Free
11 September 2020	(Bosnia and Herzegovina) Dario Šarić	Carpi	Ascoli	Undisclosed
11 September 2020	Simone Mazzocchi	Südtirol	Reggiana	Loan
11 September 2020	Marco Meneghetti	SPAL	Südtirol	Loan
11 September 2020	Davide Bettella	Atalanta	Monza	2-year loan
12 September 2020	(Croatia) Ante Rebić	(Germany) Eintracht Frankfurt	Milan	Undisclosed
12 September 2020	(Romania) Ciprian Tătărușanu	(France) Lyon	Milan	Undisclosed
12 September 2020	(Montenegro) Cristian Hadžiosmanović	Sampdoria	Casertana	Loan
12 September 2020	(Slovakia) Norbert Gyömbér	Perugia	Salernitana	Undisclosed
12 September 2020	(Cyprus) Grigoris Kastanos	Juventus	Frosinone	Loan
12 September 2020	Gianmarco Ingrosso	Pisa	Cosenza	Loan
12 September 2020	Erdis Kraja	Atalanta	Grosseto	Loan
12 September 2020	Sergio Kalaj	Lazio	Grosseto	Loan
12 September 2020	Marco Benassi	Fiorentina	Hellas Verona	Loan
13 September 2020	(Slovenia) Miha Zajc	(Turkey) Fenerbahçe	Genoa	Loan
13 September 2020	(Iceland) Sveinn Aron Guðjohnsen	Spezia	(Denmark) OB	Loan
13 September 2020	(North Macedonia) Leonard Zuta	(Sweden) Häcken	Lecce	Undisclosed
14 September 2020	(Bulgaria) Radoslav Tsonev	Lecce	(Bulgaria) Levski Sofia	Undisclosed
14 September 2020	(Netherlands) Tom van de Looi	(Netherlands) Groningen	Brescia	Undisclosed
14 September 2020	(Albania) Ardian Ismajli	(Croatia) Hajduk Split	Spezia	Undisclosed
14 September 2020	(Latvia) Aleksejs Saveljevs	Hellas Verona	Mantova	Undisclosed
14 September 2020	(Uruguay) César Falletti	Bologna	Ternana	2-year loan
14 September 2020	Alessandro Sala	Milan	Cesena	Loan
14 September 2020	Fabio Maistro	Lazio	Pescara	Loan
14 September 2020	Giuseppe Caso	Arezzo	Genoa	Undisclosed
14 September 2020	Davide Grassini	Internazionale	Carrarese	Loan
14 September 2020	Thomas Schirò	Internazionale	Carrarese	Loan
15 September 2020	Roberto Piccoli	Atalanta	Spezia	Loan
15 September 2020	Federico Mattiello	Atalanta	Spezia	Loan
15 September 2020	(Romania) Denis Drăguș	(Belgium) Standard Liège	Crotone	Loan
15 September 2020	Giacomo Pozzer	Internazionale	Monopoli	Loan
15 September 2020	(Argentina) Nahuel Molina	(Argentina) Boca Juniors	Udinese	Free
15 September 2020	(Burkina Faso) Bryan Dabo	Fiorentina	Benevento	Undisclosed
15 September 2020	(Kosovo) Vedat Muriqi	(Turkey) Fenerbahçe	Lazio	Undisclosed
15 September 2020	(Ivory Coast) Ben Lhassine Kone	Torino	Cosenza	Loan
15 September 2020	(Moldova) Vitalie Damașcan	Torino	(Netherlands) Waalwijk	Loan
15 September 2020	(Senegal) Fallou Sarr	Bologna	Ascoli	Loan
15 September 2020	(Poland) Tomasz Kupisz	Bari	Salernitana	Loan
15 September 2020	Mattia Del Favero	Juventus	Pescara	Loan
15 September 2020	Niccolò Monti	Parma	Fano	Loan
16 September 2020	Davide Frattesi	Sassuolo	Monza	Loan
16 September 2020	Stefano Negro	Monza	Perugia	Loan
16 September 2020	Stefano Scappini	Reggiana	Modena	Loan
16 September 2020	(Sweden) Joel Asoro	(England) Swansea	Genoa	Loan
16 September 2020	(Croatia) Milan Badelj	Lazio	Genoa	Undisclosed
16 September 2020	Edoardo Goldaniga	Sassuolo	Genoa	Loan
16 September 2020	Filippo Melegoni	Atalanta	Genoa	Loan
16 September 2020	(Colombia) Kevin Agudelo	Genoa	Spezia	Loan
16 September 2020	Giacomo Calò	Genoa	Pordenone	Loan
16 September 2020	(Greece) Christos Donis	(Greece) Panathinaikos	Ascoli	Loan
16 September 2020	(Morocco) Ermin Ghazoini	Frosinone	Ascoli	Undisclosed
16 September 2020	(Liechtenstein) Marcel Büchel	Juve Stabia	Ascoli	Free
16 September 2020	(Spain) Borja Valero	Internazionale	Fiorentina	Free
16 September 2020	(Colombia) Jeison Murillo	Sampdoria	(Spain) Celta	Loan
16 September 2020	Michael Folorunsho	Napoli	Reggina	Loan
16 September 2020	(Switzerland) Darian Males	(Switzerland) Luzern	Internazionale	Undisclosed
16 September 2020	Michael Ntube	Internazionale	Pro Sesto	Loan
16 September 2020	Jacopo Gianelli	Internazionale	Pro Sesto	Loan
16 September 2020	(Senegal) Ricardo Faty	(Turkey) Ankaragücü	Reggina	Free
16 September 2020	Luigi Carillo	Genoa	Casertana	Loan
16 September 2020	Aniello Viscovo	Crotone	Fano	Loan
17 September 2020	Leonardo Raggio	Genoa	Lecco	Loan
17 September 2020	Alberto De Francesco	Reggina	Avellino	Undisclosed
17 September 2020	Edoardo Vergani	Internazionale	Bologna	Loan
17 September 2020	(Czech Republic) Antonín Barák	Udinese	Hellas Verona	Loan
17 September 2020	Filippo Romagna	Cagliari	Sassuolo	Undisclosed
17 September 2020	Alessandro Tripaldelli	Sassuolo	Cagliari	Undisclosed
17 September 2020	(Brazil) Rafael	Cagliari	Spezia	Free
17 September 2020	(France) Gabriel Charpentier	Genoa	Reggina	Loan
17 September 2020	(Brazil) Reginaldo	Reggina	Catania	Undisclosed
17 September 2020	Alessandro Di Munno	Monza	Pro Sesto	Loan
17 September 2020	(Croatia) Marko Brkic	(Croatia) Dinamo Zagreb	Empoli	Loan
17 September 2020	Francesco Rodio	Crotone	Pro Vercelli	Loan
17 September 2020	Luca Verna	Pisa	Catanzaro	Undisclosed
17 September 2020	Axel Campeol	Sampdoria	Grosseto	Loan
17 September 2020	Nicola Murru	Sampdoria	Torino	Loan
17 September 2020	Lorenzo De Silvestri	Torino	Bologna	Free
17 September 2020	(Albania) Marash Kumbulla	Hellas Verona	Roma	Loan
17 September 2020	Matteo Cancellieri	Roma	Hellas Verona	Loan
17 September 2020	Aboudramane Diaby	Roma	Hellas Verona	Loan
17 September 2020	Giulio Favale	Reggiana	Cesena	Loan
18 September 2020	(Germany) Tolgay Arslan	(Turkey) Fenerbahçe	Udinese	Free
18 September 2020	(Poland) Jakub Łabojko	(Poland) Śląsk Wrocław	Brescia	Undisclosed
18 September 2020	Frank Tsadjout	Milan	Cittadella	Loan
18 September 2020	Filippo Costa	Napoli	Virtus Entella	Loan
18 September 2020	Gianluca Gaetano	Napoli	Cremonese	Loan
18 September 2020	(Argentina) Gonzalo Higuaín	Juventus	(United States) Inter Miami	Free
18 September 2020	Mirco Lipari	Juventus	Empoli	Loan
18 September 2020	Leonardo Manfredi	Atalanta	Empoli	Loan
18 September 2020	Andrea Favilli	Genoa	Hellas Verona	Loan
18 September 2020	(Ivory Coast) Jean-Daniel Akpa Akpro	Salernitana	Lazio	Undisclosed
18 September 2020	(Argentina) Tiago Casasola	Lazio	Salernitana	Loan
18 September 2020	(Cyprus) Andreas Karo	Lazio	Salernitana	Loan
18 September 2020	Cristiano Lombardi	Lazio	Salernitana	Loan
18 September 2020	(Dominican Republic) Antonio Santurro	Bologna	Catania	Loan
18 September 2020	Andrea Pinamonti	Genoa	Internazionale	Undisclosed
18 September 2020	(Albania) Isnik Alimi	Juventus	(Croatia) Šibenik	Loan
19 September 2020	(Mali) Aly Mallé	Udinese	Ascoli	Undisclosed
19 September 2020	Gabriele Corbo	Bologna	Ascoli	Loan
19 September 2020	Leonardo Candellone	Napoli	Bari	2-year loan
19 September 2020	Gianmarco Zigoni	Venezia	Novara	Loan
19 September 2020	(Bosnia and Herzegovina) Mirza Hasanbegovic	(Bulgaria) Lokomotiv Plovdiv	Venezia	Undisclosed
19 September 2020	(Ukraine) Yevhen Shakhov	Lecce	(Greece) AEK Athens	Undisclosed
19 September 2020	Davide Zappacosta	(England) Chelsea	Genoa	Loan
19 September 2020	(Croatia) Marko Pjaca	Juventus	Genoa	Loan
19 September 2020	Simone Icardi	Virtus Entella	Casertana	Undisclosed
20 September 2020	(Turkey) Cengiz Ünder	Roma	(England) Leicester City	Loan
21 September 2020	Tommaso Morosini	Monza	Feralpisalò	Loan
21 September 2020	Andrea Cambiaso	Genoa	Empoli	Loan
21 September 2020	(Argentina) Lucas Boyé	Torino	(Spain) Elche	Loan
21 September 2020	(France) Abdou Doumbia	Reggina	Carrarese	Undisclosed
21 September 2020	(Argentina) Nahuel Estévez	(Argentina) Estudiantes	Spezia	Loan
21 September 2020	(Greece) Tasos Avlonitis	(Austria) Sturm Graz	Ascoli	Undisclosed
21 September 2020	Federico Del Frate	Monza	Pro Sesto	Loan
21 September 2020	Federico Marchesi	Monza	Pro Sesto	Undisclosed
21 September 2020	(Portugal) Pedro Pereira	(Portugal) Benfica	Crotone	Loan
22 September 2020	(Netherlands) Sam Lammers	(Netherlands) PSV Eindhoven	Atalanta	Loan
22 September 2020	(Albania) Dean Liço	Lazio	Ascoli	Undisclosed
22 September 2020	Davide Di Francesco	Ascoli	Teramo	Loan
22 September 2020	Edoardo Blondett	Reggina	Alessandria	Undisclosed
22 September 2020	(Denmark) Matti Lund Nielsen	Reggina	Pro Vercelli	Undisclosed
22 September 2020	Fabiano Parisi	Avellino	Empoli	Undisclosed
22 September 2020	Filippo Nardi	Novara	Cremonese	Loan
22 September 2020	Lorenzo Colombini	Spezia	Novara	Loan
22 September 2020	(Paraguay) Kevin Parzajuk	(Paraguay) Club Olimpia	Brescia	Loan
22 September 2020	(Poland) Paweł Jaroszyński	Genoa	Pescara	Loan
22 September 2020	(Colombia) Johan Mojica	(Spain) Girona	Atalanta	Loan
22 September 2020	(Spain) Álvaro Morata	(Spain) Atlético Madrid	Juventus	Loan
22 September 2020	(Chile) Arturo Vidal	(Spain) Barcelona	Internazionale	Free
22 September 2020	(Spain) Jony Rodríguez	Lazio	(Spain) Osasuna	Loan
22 September 2020	(France) Jean-Claude Billong	Benevento	(Turkey) Hatayspor	Undisclosed
22 September 2020	Manuel De Luca	Torino	Chievo	Undisclosed
22 September 2020	Daniele Sarzi Puttini	Carpi	Ascoli	Undisclosed
23 September 2020	Cosimo Chiricò	Monza	Ascoli	Undisclosed
23 September 2020	Simone Iocolano	Monza	Lecco	Undisclosed
23 September 2020	Giuseppe Montaperto	Empoli	Cavese	Loan
23 September 2020	Nicola Nanni	Crotone	Cesena	Undisclosed
23 September 2020	Andrea Schiavone	Bari	Salernitana	Loan
23 September 2020	Emanuele Cigagna	Venezia	Paganese	Loan
23 September 2020	Matteo Stoppa	Sampdoria	Pistoiese	Loan
23 September 2020	(France) Mohamed Bahlouli	Sampdoria	Cosenza	Loan
23 September 2020	(Argentina) Julián Illanes	Fiorentina	Chievo	Loan
23 September 2020	(Brazil) Diego Farias	Cagliari	Spezia	Loan
23 September 2020	Alessandro Deiola	Cagliari	Spezia	Loan
23 September 2020	Tommaso Pobega	Milan	Spezia	Loan
23 September 2020	Alessandro Bordin	Spezia	Casertana	Loan
23 September 2020	Francesco Forte	Juve Stabia	Venezia	Undisclosed
23 September 2020	Pasquale Mazzocchi	Perugia	Venezia	Undisclosed
23 September 2020	(France) Mattéo Tramoni	(France) Ajaccio	Cagliari	Undisclosed
23 September 2020	(France) Lisandru Tramoni	(France) Ajaccio	Cagliari	Undisclosed
23 September 2020	(Angola) Zito Luvumbo	(Angola) Primeiro de Agosto	Cagliari	Undisclosed
23 September 2020	(Senegal) Adama Sane	Hellas Verona	Arezzo	Undisclosed
23 September 2020	Alessio Santese	Roma	Ascoli	Undisclosed
23 September 2020	Gianluca Di Chiara	Perugia	Reggina	2-year loan
23 September 2020	(The Gambia) Ebrima Colley	Atalanta	Hellas Verona	Loan
23 September 2020	(Sweden) Svante Ingelsson	Udinese	(Germany) SC Paderborn 07	Loan
23 September 2020	Emanuele Cicerelli	Lazio	Salernitana	Loan
24 September 2020	(Germany) Jeff Chabot	Sampdoria	Spezia	Loan
24 September 2020	(France) Lucien Agoumé	Internazionale	Spezia	Loan
24 September 2020	(Switzerland) Arlind Ajeti	(Denmark) Vejle Boldklub	Reggiana	Undisclosed
24 September 2020	Gianluca Bassano	Prato	Cittadella	Undisclosed
24 September 2020	(Scotland) Aaron Hickey	(Scotland) Hearts	Bologna	Undisclosed
24 September 2020	Gianmarco Cangiano	Bologna	Ascoli	Loan
24 September 2020	(Greece) Apostolos Vellios	(Greece) Atromitos	Ascoli	Undisclosed
24 September 2020	Ettore Gliozzi	Monza	Cosenza	Loan
24 September 2020	Claud Adjapong	Sassuolo	Lecce	Loan
24 September 2020	(Greece) Matic Kotnik	(Greece) Panionios	Brescia	Free
24 September 2020	Raoul Bellanova	Atalanta	Pescara	Loan
24 September 2020	Christian Capone	Atalanta	Pescara	Loan
24 September 2020	Christian Mora	Atalanta	Alessandria	2-year loan
24 September 2020	Leonardo Ballarini	Pro Patria	Cremonese	Loan
24 September 2020	Giacomo Manzari	Sassuolo	Carrarese	Loan
24 September 2020	Giuseppe Fella	Monopoli	Salernitana	Undisclosed
24 September 2020	Simone Palombi	Lazio	Pisa	Loan
24 September 2020	Nicola Tintori	Internazionale	Pro Vercelli	Undisclosed
24 September 2020	(Uruguay) Diego Godín	Internazionale	Cagliari	Undisclosed
24 September 2020	(Romania) Vasile Mogoș	Cremonese	Chievo	Undisclosed
24 September 2020	(Morocco) Jawad El Yamiq	Genoa	(Spain) Real Valladolid	Undisclosed
24 September 2020	(Bosnia and Herzegovina) Riad Bajić	Udinese	Ascoli	Loan
24 September 2020	Simone Sini	Ternana	Ascoli	Undisclosed
24 September 2020	Lorenzo Laverone	Ascoli	Ternana	Undisclosed
24 September 2020	Luigi Cuppone	Pisa	Casertana	Undisclosed
24 September 2020	(Albania) Arlind Ajeti	(Denmark) Vejle Boldklub	Reggiana	Undisclosed
24 September 2020	Nunzio Zizzania	Ascoli	Fermana	Undisclosed
25 September 2020	(Switzerland) Darian Males	Internazionale	Genoa	Loan
25 September 2020	(France) Andreaw Gravillon	Internazionale	(France) Lorient	Loan
25 September 2020	Antonio Candreva	Internazionale	Sampdoria	Loan
25 September 2020	Eddie Salcedo	Internazionale	Hellas Verona	Loan
25 September 2020	(Switzerland) Nicolas Haas	Atalanta	Empoli	Loan
25 September 2020	(Switzerland) Arkadiusz Reca	Atalanta	Crotone	Loan
25 September 2020	Zak Ruggiero	Crotone	Pro Vercelli	Loan
25 September 2020	Luca Mazzitelli	Sassuolo	Pisa	Loan
25 September 2020	Jérémie Broh	Sassuolo	Palermo	Undisclosed
25 September 2020	Luca Palmiero	Chievo	Napoli	Loan
25 September 2020	Kevin Bonifazi	SPAL	Udinese	Loan
25 September 2020	Enrico Brignola	Sassuolo	SPAL	Loan
25 September 2020	Leonardo Sernicola	Sassuolo	SPAL	Loan
25 September 2020	Caleb Okoli	Atalanta	SPAL	Loan
25 September 2020	Luca Ranieri	Fiorentina	SPAL	Loan
25 September 2020	Riccardo Gatti	Atalanta	Reggiana	Undisclosed
25 September 2020	Salvatore Elia	Atalanta	Perugia	Loan
25 September 2020	Andrea Zaccagno	Torino	Cremonese	Undisclosed
25 September 2020	Alessandro Fiordaliso	Torino	Cremonese	Undisclosed
25 September 2020	Francesco Rillo	Benevento	Fano	Loan
26 September 2020	Marco Sala	Sassuolo	SPAL	Loan
26 September 2020	Daniele Verde	(Greece) AEK Athens	Spezia	Loan
26 September 2020	Luca Pellegrini	Juventus	Genoa	Loan
26 September 2020	(Denmark) Peter Ankersen	Genoa	(Denmark) Copenhagen	Undisclosed
26 September 2020	(Argentina) Lautaro Valenti	Lanús	Parma	Loan
26 September 2020	Paolo Marchi	Reggina	Ravenna	Loan
26 September 2020	Mario Prezioso	Napoli	Modena	Loan
28 September 2020	Simone Andrea Ganz	Ascoli	Mantova	Loan
28 September 2020	(Germany) Abdelhamid Sabiri	(Germany) SC Paderborn 07	Ascoli	Undisclosed
28 September 2020	(Argentina) Roberto Pereyra	(England) Watford	Udinese	Undisclosed
28 September 2020	(Poland) Thiago Cionek	SPAL	Reggina	Free
28 September 2020	(Greece) Dimitris Sounas	Reggina	Perugia	Undisclosed
28 September 2020	(Montenegro) Ognjen Stijepović	Sampdoria	Alessandria	Loan
28 September 2020	Nicola Rauti	Torino	Palermo	Loan
28 September 2020	(Ghana) Kevin-Prince Boateng	Fiorentina	Monza	Free
28 September 2020	(Netherlands) Leandro Fernandes	Juventus	Pescara	Loan
28 September 2020	(Spain) Raúl Asencio	Genoa	Pescara	Loan
28 September 2020	Pietro Perina	Cosenza	Vicenza	Free
29 September 2020	Desiderio Garufo	Reggina	Catanzaro	Loan
29 September 2020	(Spain) Iago Falque	Torino	Benevento	Loan
29 September 2020	Leonardo Capezzi	Sampdoria	Salernitana	Undisclosed
29 September 2020	Salvatore Bocchetti	Hellas Verona	Pescara	Loan
29 September 2020	(Slovenia) Luka Krajnc	Frosinone	(Germany) Fortuna Düsseldorf	Undisclosed
29 September 2020	(Poland) Piotr Parzyszek	(Poland) Piast Gliwice	Frosinone	Undisclosed
29 September 2020	Lorenzo Lollo	Venezia	Bari	Undisclosed
29 September 2020	Daniel Semenzato	Pordenone	Bari	Undisclosed
29 September 2020	Filippo Berra	Bari	Pordenone	Loan
29 September 2020	Manuel Scavone	Bari	Pordenone	Loan
29 September 2020	Alfredo Bifulco	Napoli	Padova	Undisclosed
29 September 2020	(Sierra Leone) Augustus Kargbo	Crotone	Reggiana	Loan
29 September 2020	(Nigeria) William Troost-Ekong	Udinese	(England) Watford	Undisclosed
30 September 2020	(Brazil) Lucas Paquetá	Milan	(France) Lyon	Undisclosed
30 September 2020	(Brazil) Wallace	Lazio	(Turkey) Yeni Malatyaspor	Undisclosed
30 September 2020	(Slovenia) Maj Rorič	Internazionale	(Slovenia) Celje	Undisclosed
30 September 2020	(Senegal) Keita Baldé	Monaco	Sampdoria	Undisclosed
30 September 2020	Leonardo Zarpellon	Vicenza	Virtus Verona	Loan
30 September 2020	(The Gambia) Lamin Jallow	Salernitana	Vicenza	Undisclosed
30 September 2020	(Spain) Pablo Rodríguez	(Spain) Real Madrid	Lecce	Undisclosed
30 September 2020	Davide Riccardi	Lecce	Catanzaro	Loan
30 September 2020	Filippo Lora	Monza	Lecco	Undisclosed
30 September 2020	Davide Bertoncini	Reggina	Como	Undisclosed
30 September 2020	Francesco Orlando	Salernitana	Juve Stabia	Loan
1 October 2020	(Croatia) Antonio Marin	(Croatia) Dinamo Zagreb	Monza	Loan
1 October 2020	(Norway) Jens Petter Hauge	(Norway) Bodø/Glimt	Milan	Undisclosed
1 October 2020	Antonino Ragusa	Hellas Verona	Brescia	Loan
1 October 2020	Alessandro Lovisa	Fiorentina	Gubbio	Loan
1 October 2020	Francesco Stanco	Cittadella	Imolese	Undisclosed
1 October 2020	(Greece) Georgios Vagiannidis	Internazionale	(Belgium) Sint-Truidense	Loan
1 October 2020	(Poland) Sebastian Musiolik	(Poland) Raków Częstochowa	Pordenone	Loan
1 October 2020	(Slovenia) Domen Zajšek	(Slovenia) Maribor	Roma	Undisclosed
1 October 2020	(Brazil) Gabriel Pereira	Monaco	Lazio	Loan
1 October 2020	(Algeria) Mohamed Farès	SPAL	Lazio	Undisclosed
1 October 2020	(Slovenia) Rok Vodišek	Genoa	(Slovenia) Triglav Kranj	Loan
1 October 2020	(Ghana) Godfred Donsah	Bologna	(Turkey) Çaykur Rizespor	Loan
1 October 2020	(Romania) Gabriel Borbei	(Romania) Politehnica Timișoara	Lecce	Undisclosed
1 October 2020	Jacopo Petriccione	Lecce	Crotone	Undisclosed
1 October 2020	Leonardo Morosini	Brescia	Virtus Entella	Undisclosed
1 October 2020	Felice D'Amico	Sampdoria	Chievo	Loan
1 October 2020	(Czech Republic) Martin Graiciar	Fiorentina	(Czech Republic) Mladá Boleslav	Loan
1 October 2020	(France) Zinédine Machach	Napoli	(Netherlands) VVV-Venlo	Loan
2 October 2020	Marco Frediani	Parma	Alessandria	Undisclosed
2 October 2020	(Spain) Álex Berenguer	Torino	(Spain) Athletic Bilbao	Undisclosed
2 October 2020	(Argentina) Marcos Curado	Genoa	Frosinone	Loan
2 October 2020	(Poland) Mariusz Stępiński	Hellas Verona	Lecce	Loan
2 October 2020	Fabio Depaoli	Sampdoria	Atalanta	Loan
2 October 2020	Gianluca Scamacca	Sassuolo	Genoa	Loan
2 October 2020	(Denmark) Jens Odgaard	Sassuolo	(Switzerland) Lugano	Loan
2 October 2020	(Sweden) Nikola Vasić	(Sweden) Akropolis	Reggina	Undisclosed
2 October 2020	(Brazil) Andreas Pereira	(England) Manchester United	Lazio	Loan
2 October 2020	(Guinea) Karamoko Cissé	Hellas Verona	Cittadella	Undisclosed
2 October 2020	Daniele Altobelli	Salernitana	Catanzaro	Undisclosed
2 October 2020	Mario De Marino	Venezia	Bisceglie	Undisclosed
2 October 2020	Devid Bouah	Roma	Cosenza	Loan
2 October 2020	Genny Rondinella	Chievo	Pistoiese	Loan
2 October 2020	(Croatia) Ante Ćorić	Roma	(Netherlands) VVV-Venlo	Loan
2 October 2020	Dario Del Fabro	Juventus	(Netherlands) ADO Den Haag	Loan
2 October 2020	(Senegal) Abdou Diakhaté	Parma	(Slovenia) Gorica	Undisclosed
2 October 2020	(Austria) Lukas Spendlhofer	(Austria) Sturm Graz	Ascoli	Undisclosed
2 October 2020	Luca Falbo	Lazio	Viterbese	Loan
3 October 2020	(Argentina) Juan Brunetta	(Argentina) Godoy Cruz	Parma	Loan
3 October 2020	(Brazil) Dalbert	Internazionale	(France) Rennes	Loan
3 October 2020	Daniele Rugani	Juventus	(France) Rennes	Loan
3 October 2020	(Netherlands) Alessio Da Cruz	Parma	(Netherlands) Groningen	Loan
3 October 2020	Alberto Paleari	Cittadella	Genoa	Loan
3 October 2020	Gabriele Bellodi	Milan	Alessandria	Loan
3 October 2020	Michele Fornasier	Parma	Cremonese	Undisclosed
3 October 2020	(Argentina) Franco Ferrari	Napoli	Como	Loan
3 October 2020	(Germany) Amin Younes	Napoli	(Germany) Eintracht Frankfurt	Loan
3 October 2020	(Argentina) Bruno Amione	(Argentina) Belgrano	Hellas Verona	Undisclosed
3 October 2020	(Portugal) Ronaldo Vieira	Sampdoria	Hellas Verona	Loan
3 October 2020	Nicolò Casale	Hellas Verona	Empoli	Loan
3 October 2020	Duccio Toccafondi	Prato	Empoli	Loan
3 October 2020	Alessandro Garattoni	Crotone	Juve Stabia	Undisclosed
3 October 2020	Rolando Mandragora	Udinese	Juventus	€10,7m
3 October 2020	Rolando Mandragora	Juventus	Udinese	Loan
3 October 2020	(Romania) Adrian Petre	(Romania) FCSB	Cosenza	Loan
3 October 2020	(Croatia) Mario Šitum	(Turkey) Kayserispor	Reggina	Undisclosed
3 October 2020	(Portugal) Adrien Silva	(England) Leicester City	Sampdoria	Undisclosed
4 October 2020	(Switzerland) Simon Sohma	(Switzerland) Zürich	Parma	Undisclosed
4 October 2020	(Portugal) Diogo Dalot	(England) Manchester United	Milan	Loan
4 October 2020	(Sweden) John Björkengren	(England) Falkenberg	Lecce	Undisclosed
4 October 2020	(Uzbekistan) Eldor Shomurodov	(Russia) Rostov	Genoa	Undisclosed
4 October 2020	(France) Abou Ba	(France) Nantes	Cosenza	Loan
4 October 2020	(Brazil) Ryder Matos	Udinese	Empoli	Loan
4 October 2020	Pietro Iemmello	Benevento	(Spain) Las Palmas	Loan
4 October 2020	Davide Mazzocco	SPAL	Virtus Entella	Loan
4 October 2020	Marco Migliorini	Salernitana	Novara	Undisclosed
4 October 2020	Marco Firenze	Salernitana	Novara	Loan
4 October 2020	Filippo D'Andrea	Atletico Terme Fiuggi	Salernitana	Loan
5 October 2020	(Romania) Valentin Mihăilă	(Romania) CSU Craiova	Parma	Undisclosed
5 October 2020	(France) Wylan Cyprien	(France) Nice	Parma	Loan
5 October 2020	Hans Nicolussi Caviglia	Juventus	Parma	Loan
5 October 2020	Matteo Darmian	Parma	Internazionale	Loan
5 October 2020	(Albania) Kastriot Dermaku	Parma	Lecce	Loan
5 October 2020	Mattia De Sciglio	Juventus	(France) Lyon	Loan
5 October 2020	Marcello Trotta	Frosinone	(Portugal) Famalicão	Loan
5 October 2020	(Colombia) Brayan Vera	Lecce	Cosenza	Loan
5 October 2020	Gennaro Borrelli	Pescara	Cosenza	Loan
5 October 2020	Nicolas Izzillo	Pisa	Casertana	Loan
5 October 2020	Davide Petrucci	Ascoli	Cosenza	Undisclosed
5 October 2020	(Slovenia) Kristjan Matoševič	Triestina	Cosenza	Undisclosed
5 October 2020	Riccardo Moreo	Cosenza	Lucchese	Loan
5 October 2020	Gianluca Litteri	Cosenza	Triestina	Undisclosed
5 October 2020	Mattia Bani	Bologna	Genoa	Loan
5 October 2020	Kevin Piscopo	Empoli	Carrarese	Loan
5 October 2020	Davide Merola	Empoli	Arezzo	Loan
5 October 2020	(Senegal) Mouhamadou Sakho	Empoli	Arezzo	Loan
5 October 2020	Jacopo Furlan	Catania	Empoli	Undisclosed
5 October 2020	Nicholas Pierini	Sassuolo	Ascoli	Loan
5 October 2020	(Portugal) Diogo Pinto	Ascoli	Potenza	Loan
5 October 2020	(Ivory Coast) Koffi Djidji	Torino	Crotone	Loan
5 October 2020	Samuele Mulattieri	Internazionale	(Netherlands) Volendam	Loan
5 October 2020	Lorenzo Pirola	Internazionale	Monza	Loan
5 October 2020	(Brazil) Douglas Costa	Juventus	Bayern Munich	Loan
5 October 2020	Iacopo Cernigoi	Salernitana	Juve Stabia	Loan
5 October 2020	Mirko Antonucci	Roma	Salernitana	Loan
5 October 2020	(Netherlands) Justin Kluivert	Roma	(Germany) RB Leipzig	Loan
5 October 2020	(Argentina) Diego Perotti	Roma	(Turkey) Fenerbahçe	Loan
5 October 2020	(France) Guillaume Gigliotti	Crotone	Chievo	Loan
5 October 2020	Amato Ciciretti	Napoli	Chievo	Loan
5 October 2020	Simone Magnaghi	Pordenone	Südtirol	Loan
5 October 2020	(Brazil) Lucas Felippe	Hellas Verona	Mantova	Loan
5 October 2020	Luca Antei	Benevento	Pescara	Loan
5 October 2020	(Slovenia) Dejan Vokić	Benevento	Pescara	Loan
5 October 2020	(Argentina) Nicolás Schiappacasse	(Spain) Atlético Madrid B	Sassuolo	Undisclosed
5 October 2020	(Argentina) Ignacio Pussetto	(England) Watford	Udinese	Loan
5 October 2020	Antonio Barreca	Monaco	Fiorentina	Loan
5 October 2020	(Argentina) Lucas Martínez Quarta	(Argentina) River Plate	Fiorentina	Loan
5 October 2020	Federico Chiesa	Fiorentina	Juventus	Loan
5 October 2020	Federico Ceccherini	Fiorentina	Hellas Verona	Loan
5 October 2020	Federico Bonazzoli	Sampdoria	Torino	Loan
5 October 2020	Roberto Zammarini	Pisa	Pordenone	Loan
5 October 2020	Samuele Longo	Internazionale	Vicenza	Undisclosed
5 October 2020	Mattia Viviani	Brescia	Chievo	Undisclosed
5 October 2020	Alessandro Favalli	Reggiana	Perugia	Loan
5 October 2020	Marco Pompetti	Internazionale	Cavese	Loan
5 October 2020	Sebastiano Luperto	Napoli	Crotone	Loan
5 October 2020	(France) Tiémoué Bakayoko	(England) Chelsea	Napoli	Loan
5 October 2020	Samuele Perisan	Udinese	Pordenone	Undisclosed
5 October 2020	Ivan Provedel	Empoli	Spezia	Undisclosed
5 October 2020	(Lithuania) Augustinas Klimavičius	Genoa	Empoli	Loan
5 October 2020	Tommaso Fantacci	Empoli	Juve Stabia	Undisclosed
5 October 2020	(Slovakia) Ľubomír Tupta	Hellas Verona	Ascoli	Loan
5 October 2020	(Croatia) Nikola Kalinić	(Spain) Atlético Madrid	Hellas Verona	Undisclosed
5 October 2020	Nicholas Pierini	Sassuolo	Ascoli	Loan
5 October 2020	Andrea Ghion	Sassuolo	Carpi	Loan
5 October 2020	(France) Maxime Lopez	(France) Olympique Marseille	Sassuolo	Loan
5 October 2020	(France) Jean-Victor Makengo	(France) Nice	Udinese	Undisclosed
5 October 2020	Marco Ballarini	Udinese	Piacenza	Loan
5 October 2020	(Poland) Łukasz Teodorczyk	Udinese	(Belgium) Charleroi	Loan
5 October 2020	(Spain) Gerard Deulofeu	(England) Watford	Udinese	Loan
5 October 2020	(France) Jean-Victor Makengo	(France) Nice	Udinese	Undisclosed
5 October 2020	(Canada) Axel Desjardins	Spezia	Novara	Loan
5 October 2020	Riccardo Ladinetti	Cagliari	Olbia	Loan
5 October 2020	(Bulgaria) Kiril Despodov	Cagliari	(Bulgaria) Ludogorets Razgrad	Loan
5 October 2020	(Algeria) Adam Ounas	Napoli	Cagliari	Loan
5 October 2020	(Venezuela) Yordan Osorio	(Portugal) Porto	Parma	Undisclosed
5 October 2020	(Belgium) Maxime Busi	(Belgium) Charleroi	Parma	Undisclosed
5 October 2020	(Spain) José Callejón	Napoli	Fiorentina	Free
5 October 2020	Marco Carraro	Atalanta	Frosinone	Loan
5 October 2020	Luca Siligardi	Parma	Crotone	Loan
5 October 2020	Simone Calvano	Hellas Verona	Triestina	Undisclosed
5 October 2020	Pierluigi Cappelluzzo	Hellas Verona	Viterbese	Undisclosed
5 October 2020	(England) Chris Smalling	(England) Manchester United	Roma	€15m
5 October 2020	(Netherlands) Bobby Adekanye	Lazio	(Spain) Cádiz	Loan
5 October 2020	(Netherlands) Wesley Hoedt	(England) Southampton	Lazio	Loan
5 October 2020	(Belgium) Jordan Lukaku	Lazio	(Belgium) Antwerp	Loan
5 October 2020	(Lithuania) Marius Adamonis	Lazio	Salernitana	Loan
5 October 2020	(Poland) Patryk Dziczek	Lazio	Salernitana	Loan
5 October 2020	(Brazil) André Anderson	Lazio	Salernitana	Loan
5 October 2020	(Germany) Oliver Kragl	Benevento	Ascoli	Loan
5 October 2020	(Uruguay) Diego Laxalt	Milan	(Scotland) Celtic	Loan
5 October 2020	(Croatia) Karlo Letica	(Belgium) Club Brugge	Sampdoria	Loan
5 October 2020	(Sweden) Robin Olsen	Roma	(England) Everton	Loan
5 October 2020	Mattia Minesso	Pisa	Perugia	Loan
5 October 2020	Alessandro Confente	Chievo	Catania	Loan
5 October 2020	(Iceland) Hólmbert Friðjónsson	(Norway) Aalesunds	Brescia	Undisclosed
5 October 2020	(Poland) Filip Jagiełło	Genoa	Brescia	Loan
5 October 2020	Andrea Marcucci	Imolese	Reggina	Undisclosed
5 October 2020	Jacopo Da Riva	Atalanta	Vicenza	Loan
5 October 2020	Adriano Montalto	Cremonese	Bari	Undisclosed
5 October 2020	Nicola Citro	Frosinone	Bari	Undisclosed
5 October 2020	Giuseppe Fella	Salernitana	Avellino	Loan
5 October 2020	(Brazil) Felipe Curcio	Salernitana	Padova	Loan
5 October 2020	(Senegal) Joel Baraye	Padova	Salernitana	Loan
5 October 2020	(Croatia) Amer Gojak	(Croatia) Dinamo Zagreb	Torino	Loan
5 October 2020	Lorenzo Rosseti	Ascoli	Como	Undisclosed
5 October 2020	Matteo D'Agostino	Ascoli	Olbia	Loan
5 October 2020	Francesco Intinacelli	Ascoli	Fermana	Loan
5 October 2020	(Portugal) Diogo Pinto	Ascoli	Potenza	Loan
5 October 2020	Francesco Semeraro	Ascoli	Cavese	Loan
5 October 2020	Erik Gerbi	Sampdoria	Teramo	Loan
5 October 2020	Cristian Bunino	Pescara	Teramo	Loan
