= 2025–26 FC Crotone season =

Football season

FC Crotone
2025–26 season
- Manager: Emilio Longo
- Stadium: Stadio Ezio Scida
- Serie C Group C: 7th
- Coppa Italia Serie C: Second round
- Top goalscorer: League: Guido Gómez (5); All: Guido Gómez (5)

The 2025–26 season was the 116th in the history of Football Club Crotone and the club's fourth consecutive season in Serie C. In addition to the domestic league, Crotone competed in the Coppa Italia Serie C. The season began on 17 August 2025.

== Squad ==
=== Transfers In ===
Pos.	Player	Transferred from	Fee	Date	Source
MF	(Bulgaria) Dimitar Kostadinov	(Italy) Clodiense	Loan return	30 June 2025	
DF	(Switzerland) Daniel Leo	(Italy) Perugia	Loan return	30 June 2025	
MF	(Albania) Aristidi Kolaj	(Italy) Renate	Loan return	30 June 2025	
MF	(Italy) Eugenio D'Ursi	(Italy) Gubbio	Loan return	30 June 2025	
MF	(Croatia) Jurica Jurčec	(Croatia) NK Sesvete	Loan return	30 June 2025	
MF	(Italy) Marco Zunno	(Italy) Cremonese	Free	1 July 2025	
MF	(Italy) Mattia Sandri	(Italy) Milan Futuro	Undisclosed	23 July 2025	
MF	(Italy) Fabrizio Marazzotti	(Italy) Roma U20	Undisclosed	12 August 2025	
FW	(Italy) Mario Perlingieri	(Italy) Benevento	Loan	1 September 2025	
MF	(Italy) Simone Calvano	(Italy) Monopoli	Loan	1 September 2025	
DF	(Italy) Filippo Berra	(Italy) Benevento	Undisclosed	1 September 2025	

=== Transfers Out ===
Pos.	Player	Transferred to	Fee	Date	Source
MF	(Brazil) Jonathan Silva	(Italy) Torino	Loan return	30 June 2025	
FW	(Italy) Mario Vilardi	(Italy) Napoli U20	Loan return	30 June 2025	
MF	(Bulgaria) Dimitar Kostadinov	(Bulgaria) Chernomorets 1919	Free	1 July 2025	
DF	(France) Maxime Giron	(Italy) Trapani	Undisclosed	3 July 2025	
MF	(Albania) Aristidi Kolaj	(Italy) Renate	Free	17 July 2025	
MF	(Italy) Eugenio D'Ursi	(Italy) Sorrento		1 August 2025	
MF	(Croatia) Jurica Jurčec	(Croatia) NK Rudar Dubrava Zabočka	Contract terminated	1 August 2025	
MF	(Italy) Mario Aprea		Contract terminated	1 August 2025	
FW	(Italy) Gesualdo Napolitano	(Italy) Lumezzane	Loan	20 August 2025	
MF	(Italy) Thomas Schirò	(Italy) Pro Patria	Undisclosed	30 August 2025	
GK	(Italy) Francesco D'Alterio	(Italy) Ternana	Undisclosed	1 September 2025	
DF	(Italy) Nicolò Armini	(Italy) Campobasso	Loan	1 September 2025	
FW	(Italy) Marco Tumminello	(Italy) Benevento	Undisclosed	1 September 2025	
FW	(Italy) Raffaele Cantisani	(Italy) Benevento	Undisclosed	1 September 2025	

== Friendlies ==
20 July 2025	Crotone	6–1	Rocca di Neto	Sila
17:00	Gallo 6'; Leo 47'; Napolitano 52'; Guerra 58'; Rispoli 65'; Vrenna 75'	Report	Maesano 62'

== Competitions ==
=== Overall record ===
Competition	First match	Last match	Starting round	Record							
Competition	First match	Last match	Starting round	Pld	W	D	L	GF	GA	GD	Win %
Serie C	25 August 2025	26 April 2026	Matchday 1	5	2	2	1	10	5	+5	40.00
Coppa Italia Serie C	17 August 2025		First round	1	1	0	0	1	0	+1	100.00
Total				6	3	2	1	11	5	+6	50.00

Last updated: 20 September 2025
Source: Competitions

=== Serie C ===
Group C

==== Results summary ====
Overall								Home						Away					
Pld	W	D	L	GF	GA	GD	Pts	W	D	L	GF	GA	GD	W	D	L	GF	GA	GD
5	2	2	1	10	5	+5	8	1	1	1	3	2	+1	1	1	0	7	3	+4

Last updated: 20 September 2025.

==== Results by round ====
Round	1	2	3	4	5
Ground	H	A	H	A	H
Result	L	W	D	D	W
Position	15	7	7	7	

Updated to match(es) played on 20 September 2025. Source:
A = Away; H = Home; W = Win; D = Draw; L = Loss

==== Matches ====
The competition draw was held on 28 July 2025.

25 August 2025 1	Crotone	1–2	Benevento	Crotone
21:00 UTC+2	Gómez 62'		Salvemini 10'; Lamesta 13'	Stadium: Stadio Ezio Scida; Attendance: 5,470; Referee: Gianluca Renzi

31 August 2025 2	Team Altamura	0–4	Crotone	Altamura
18:00 UTC+2			Gómez 5'; Maggio 27', 46'; Murano 32'	Stadium: Stadio Antonio D'Angelo; Attendance: 1,500; Referee: Fabio Rosario Luongo

7 September 2025 3	Crotone	0–0	Cosenza	Crotone
17:30 UTC+2				Stadium: Stadio Ezio Scida; Referee: Edoardo Gianquinto

12 September 2025 4	Potenza	3–3	Crotone	Potenza
20:30 UTC+2	D'Auria 40', 54'; Novella 72'		Gómez 22', 46'; Zunno 29'	Stadium: Stadio Alfredo Viviani; Attendance: 2,999; Referee: Roberto Lovison

20 September 2025 5	Crotone	2–0	Siracusa	Crotone
17:30 UTC+2				Stadium: Stadio Ezio Scida; Referee: Lorenzo Maccarini

=== Coppa Italia Serie C ===
17 August 2025 First round	Crotone	1–0	Catania	Crotone
21:00 UTC+2	Murano 9'			Stadium: Stadio Ezio Scida; Attendance: 4,660; Referee: Stefano Striamo

28 October 2025 Second round	Crotone	v	Foggia
20:30 UTC+2
