= 2020–21 Udinese Calcio season =

Udinese
2020–21 season
- Owner: Giampaolo Pozzo
- President: Franco Soldati
- Manager: Luca Gotti
- Stadium: Stadio Friuli
- Serie A: 14th
- Coppa Italia: Fourth round
- Top goalscorer: League: Rodrigo De Paul (9); All: Rodrigo De Paul (9)
Home colours	Away colours	Third colours

The 2020–21 season was the 124th season in the existence of Udinese Calcio and its 26th consecutive season in the top flight of Italian football. In addition to the domestic league, Udinese participated in this season's edition of the Coppa Italia. The season covered the period from 3 August 2020 to 30 June 2021.

== Players ==
=== First-team squad ===
As of 4 February 2021

Note: Flags indicate national team as defined under FIFA eligibility rules; some limited exceptions apply. Players may hold more than one non-FIFA nationality.

No.	Pos.	Nation	Player
1	GK	ARG	Juan Musso
3	DF	BRA	Samir (vice-captain)
4	DF	AUT	Sebastian Prödl
5	DF	NED	Thomas Ouwejan (on loan from AZ)
6	MF	FRA	Jean-Victor Makengo
7	FW	ITA	Stefano Okaka
8	MF	BIH	Mato Jajalo
9	FW	ESP	Gerard Deulofeu
10	MF	ARG	Rodrigo De Paul (captain)
11	MF	BRA	Walace
14	DF	ITA	Kevin Bonifazi (on loan from SPAL)
16	DF	ARG	Nahuel Molina
17	DF	NED	Bram Nuytinck
19	DF	DEN	Jens Stryger Larsen
22	MF	GER	Tolgay Arslan

No.	Pos.	Nation	Player
23	FW	ARG	Ignacio Pussetto (on loan from Watford)
29	MF	SRB	Petar Mićin
30	FW	MKD	Ilija Nestorovski
31	GK	ITA	Manuel Gasparini
32	FW	ESP	Fernando Llorente
37	MF	ARG	Roberto Pereyra
45	FW	ITA	Fernando Forestieri
50	DF	BRA	Rodrigo Becão
64	MF	NOR	Martin Palumbo
87	DF	FRA	Sebastien De Maio
90	DF	NED	Marvin Zeegelaar
96	GK	ITA	Simone Scuffet
—	FW	BRA	Ewandro
—	FW	NED	Jayden Braaf (on loan from Manchester City)

=== On loan ===
As of 4 February 2021

Note: Flags indicate national team as defined under FIFA eligibility rules; some limited exceptions apply. Players may hold more than one non-FIFA nationality.

No.	Pos.	Nation	Player
—	GK	GRE	Giannis Sourdis (at Cjarlins Muzane until 30 June 2021)
—	DF	ITA	Federico Ermacora (at Carrarese until 30 June 2021)
—	DF	GHA	Nicholas Opoku (at (France) Amiens until 30 June 2021)
—	MF	ITA	Marco Ballarini (at Piacenza until 30 June 2021)
—	MF	CZE	Antonín Barák (at Hellas Verona until 30 June 2021)
—	MF	ITA	Mattia Compagnon (at Juventus U23 until 30 June 2021)
—	MF	SEN	Mamadou Coulibaly (at Salernitana until 30 June 2021)

No.	Pos.	Nation	Player
—	MF	SWE	Svante Ingelsson (at (Germany) SC Paderborn until 30 June 2021)
—	MF	CZE	Jan Kubala (at (Czech Republic) FC Slavoj Vyšehrad until 30 June 2021)
—	FW	BIH	Riad Bajić (at Ascoli until 30 June 2021)
—	FW	ESP	Cristo González (at (Spain) Mirandés until 30 June 2021)
—	FW	ITA	Kevin Lasagna (at Hellas Verona until 30 June 2021)
—	FW	BRA	Ryder Matos (at Empoli until 30 June 2021)
—	FW	POL	Łukasz Teodorczyk (at (Belgium) Charleroi until 30 June 2021)
—	FW	BRA	Felipe Vizeu (at (Brazil) Ceará until 30 June 2021)

== Pre-season and friendlies ==
Win Draw Loss Fixtures

29 August 2020 Friendly	Udinese (Italy)	3–2	(Italy) Vicenza	Manzano, Italy
19:00 CEST (UTC+2)				Stadium: Stadio Comunale Giuseppe Morigi; Attendance: 0

3 September 2020 Friendly	Udinese (Italy)	3–0	(Italy) Legnago Salus	Manzano, Italy
19:00 CEST (UTC+2)				Stadium: Stadio Comunale Giuseppe Morigi; Attendance: 0

13 September 2020 Friendly	Udinese (Italy)	0–1	(Italy) Venezia	Manzano, Italy
19:00 CEST (UTC+2)				Stadium: Stadio Comunale Giuseppe Morigi; Attendance: 0

19 September 2020 Friendly	Udinese (Italy)	0–1	(Italy) SPAL	Premariacco, Italy
14:30 CEST (UTC+2)				Stadium: Centro Sportivo Premariacco; Attendance: 0

== Competitions ==
=== Overview ===
Competition	First match	Last match	Starting round	Final position	Record							
Competition	First match	Last match	Starting round	Final position	Pld	W	D	L	GF	GA	GD	Win %
Serie A	27 September 2020	23 May 2021	Matchday 1	14th	38	10	10	18	42	58	−16	26.32
Coppa Italia	28 October 2020	25 November 2020	Third round	Fourth round	2	1	0	1	3	2	+1	50.00
Total					40	11	10	19	45	60	−15	27.50

Last updated: 23 May 2021
Source: Soccerway

=== Serie A ===
==== League table ====
Pos	Team	Pld	W	D	L	GF	GA	GD	Pts
12	Bologna	38	10	11	17	51	65	−14	41
13	Fiorentina	38	9	13	16	47	59	−12	40
14	Udinese	38	10	10	18	42	58	−16	40
15	Spezia	38	9	12	17	52	72	−20	39
16	Cagliari	38	9	10	19	43	59	−16	37

Source: Serie A, Soccerway
Rules for classification: 1) Points; 2) Head-to-head points; 3) Head-to-head goal difference; 4) Goal difference; 5) Goals scored; 6) Draw. (Note: Head-to-head record is used only after all the matches between the teams in question have been played)

==== Results summary ====
Overall								Home						Away					
Pld	W	D	L	GF	GA	GD	Pts	W	D	L	GF	GA	GD	W	D	L	GF	GA	GD
38	10	10	18	42	58	−16	40	5	5	9	14	19	−5	5	5	9	28	39	−11

Last updated: 23 May 2021.
Source: Serie A

==== Results by round ====
Round	1	2	3	4	5	6	7	8	9	10	11	12	13	14	15	16	17	18	19	20	21	22	23	24	25	26	27	28	29	30	31	32	33	34	35	36	37	38
Ground	H	A	H	H	A	H	A	H	A	H	A	H	A	H	A	A	H	A	H	A	H	A	A	H	A	H	A	H	A	H	A	H	A	H	H	A	H	A
Result	L	L	L	W	L	L	D	W	W	D	W	D	D	L	L	D	L	L	D	W	W	L	D	W	D	W	D	L	L	L	W	L	W	L	D	L	L	L
Position	14	17	20	17	18	18	19	16	13	14	10	10	11	12	13	13	15	15	14	13	11	14	13	12	11	11	10	12	12	12	12	12	11	11	11	12	12	14

Updated to match(es) played on 23 May 2021. Source: Serie A
A = Away; H = Home; W = Win; D = Draw; L = Loss

==== Matches ====
The league fixtures were announced on 2 September 2020.

27 September 2020 2	Hellas Verona	1–0	Udinese	Verona
15:00 CEST (UTC+2)	Favilli (yellow card) 51', (goal) 57'	Report		Stadium: Stadio Marcantonio Bentegodi; Referee: Manuel Volpi

30 September 2020 1	Udinese	0–2	Spezia	Udine
18:00 CEST (UTC+2)		Report	Galabinov 29', 90+4'; Terzi (yellow card) 39' (yellow-red card) 66'; Ferrer (yellow card) 79'; Ramos (yellow card) 86'; Farias (yellow card) 90+4'	Stadium: Stadio Friuli; Referee: Alessandro Prontera
Note: The match was originally scheduled for 20 September 2020, but was postponed due to Spezia's involvement in the Serie B promotion play-offs.

3 October 2020 3	Udinese	0–1	Roma	Udine
20:45 CEST (UTC+2)	Samir (yellow card) 79'	Report	Pedro 55'	Stadium: Stadio Friuli; Referee: Rosario Abisso

18 October 2020 4	Udinese	3–2	Parma	Udine
18:00 CEST (UTC+2)	Samir 28'; Becão (yellow card) 32'; Arslan (yellow card) 45'; Iacoponi 52' (o.g.); Pussetto 88'; Makengo (yellow card) 90+1'	Report	Hernani 26'; Brugman (yellow card) 57'; Karamoh 70'; Iacoponi (yellow card) 73'	Stadium: Stadio Friuli; Referee: Michael Fabbri

25 October 2020 5	Fiorentina	3–2	Udinese	Florence
18:00 CET (UTC+1)	Castrovilli 11', 51', (yellow card) 63'; Milenković 21'	Report	Arslan (yellow card) 41'; Okaka 43', 86'; Pussetto (yellow card) 66'; Becão (yellow card) 85'	Stadium: Stadio Artemio Franchi; Referee: Francesco Fourneau

1 November 2020 6	Udinese	1–2	Milan	Udine
12:30 CET (UTC+1)	Becão (yellow card) 24'; Arslan (yellow card) 39'; De Paul 48' (pen.)	Report	Hernandez (yellow card) 13'; Kessié 18'; G. Donnarumma (yellow card) 49'; Ibrahimović 83'	Stadium: Stadio Friuli; Attendance: 0 Referee: Marco Di Bello

6 November 2020 7	Sassuolo	0–0	Udinese	Reggio Emilia
20:45 CET (UTC+1)	Traorè (yellow card) 31'; Ferrari (yellow card) 43'	Report	Pussetto (yellow card) 9'; Nuytinck (yellow card) 16'	Stadium: Mapei Stadium; Attendance: 0 Referee: Eugenio Abbattista

22 November 2020 8	Udinese	1–0	Genoa	Udine
18:00 CET (UTC+1)	De Paul 34'; Arslan (yellow card) 65'; Musso (yellow card) 76'	Report	Masiello (yellow card) 31'; Badelj (yellow card) 63'; Scamacca (yellow card) 90+5'; Perin (red card) 90+7'	Stadium: Stadio Friuli; Attendance: 0 Referee: Gianpaolo Calvarese

29 November 2020 9	Lazio	1–3	Udinese	Rome
12:30 CET (UTC+1)	Farès (yellow card) 45'; Immobile 74' (pen.); Lucas (yellow card) 77'; Akpa Akpro (yellow card) 90+3'	Report	Arslan 18', (yellow card) 32'; Pereyra (yellow card) 45'; Samir (yellow card) 45+3'; Pussetto 45+3'; Forestieri 71'; Musso (yellow card) 73'	Stadium: Stadio Olimpico; Attendance: 0 Referee: Gianluca Aureliano

12 December 2020 11	Torino	2–3	Udinese	Turin
18:00 CET (UTC+1)	Lyanco (yellow card) 37'; Vojvoda (yellow card) 51'; Belotti 66'; Bonazzoli 67'; Lukić (yellow card) 88'	Report	Pussetto 24'; Pereyra (yellow card) 37'; De Paul 54'; Nestorovski 69'; Musso (yellow card) 76'; Becão (yellow card) 81'	Stadium: Stadio Olimpico Grande Torino; Attendance: 0 Referee: Davide Massa

15 December 2020 12	Udinese	0–0	Crotone	Udine
18:30 CET (UTC+1)	Samir (yellow card) 8'	Report	Messias (yellow card) 28'; Petriccione (yellow card) 39'; Eduardo (yellow card) 77'; Drăguș (yellow card) 87'	Stadium: Stadio Friuli; Attendance: 0 Referee: Antonio Di Martino

20 December 2020 13	Cagliari	1–1	Udinese	Cagliari
15:00 CET (UTC+1)	Lykogiannis 27'; Pavoletti (yellow card) 45'; Nández (yellow card) 70'	Report	Lasagna 57'; Pereyra (yellow card) 75'	Stadium: Sardegna Arena; Attendance: 0 Referee: Marco Piccinini

23 December 2020 14	Udinese	0–2	Benevento	Udine
20:45 CET (UTC+1)	Becão (yellow card) 20'	Report	Insigne (yellow card) 8'; Caprari 9'; Tuia (yellow card) 45'; Letizia 77'	Stadium: Stadio Friuli; Attendance: 0 Referee: Manuel Volpi

3 January 2021 15	Juventus	4–1	Udinese	Turin
20:45 CET (UTC+1)	Chiesa (yellow card) 7', (goal) 49'; Ronaldo 31', 70'; McKennie (yellow card) 33'; De Ligt (yellow card) 64'; Dybala 90+4'	Report	Zeegelaar 90'	Stadium: Allianz Stadium; Attendance: 0 Referee: Piero Giacomelli

6 January 2021 16	Bologna	2–2	Udinese	Bologna
15:00 CET (UTC+1)	Tomiyasu 19'; Svanberg (yellow card) 36' (yellow-red card) 47', (goal) 40'; Schouten (yellow card) 60'; Da Costa (yellow card) 86'	Report	Walace (yellow card) 21'; Samir (yellow card) 26'; Pereyra 34'; Lasagna (yellow card) 78'; Arslan 90+2'	Stadium: Stadio Renato Dall'Ara; Attendance: 0 Referee: Giovanni Ayroldi

10 January 2021 17	Udinese	1–2	Napoli	Udine
15:00 CET (UTC+1)	Lasagna 27'; Arslan (yellow card) 44'; Samir (yellow card) 67'; Zeegelaar (yellow card) 86'	Report	Insigne 15' (pen.); Di Lorenzo (yellow card) 37'; Bakayoko 90'	Stadium: Stadio Friuli; Attendance: 0 Referee: Fabrizio Pasqua

16 January 2021 18	Sampdoria	2–1	Udinese	Genoa
20:45 CET (UTC+1)	Candreva 67' (pen.); Torregrossa 81'; Askildsen (yellow card) 86'	Report	De Paul 55'; Zeegelaar (yellow card) 62'	Stadium: Stadio Luigi Ferraris; Attendance: 0 Referee: Juan Luca Sacchi

20 January 2021 10	Udinese	1–1	Atalanta	Udine
15:00 CET (UTC+1)	Pereyra 1', (yellow card) 11'; Zeegelaar (yellow card) 75'; Bonifazi (yellow card) 90+2'	Report	Muriel 44'; Freuler (yellow card) 83'; Romero (yellow card) 90+3'	Stadium: Stadio Friuli; Attendance: 0 Referee: Gianpaolo Calvarese
Note: The match was originally scheduled for 6 December 2020, but was postponed due to a waterlogged pitch.

23 January 2021 19	Udinese	0–0	Internazionale	Udine
18:00 CET (UTC+1)	Arslan (yellow card) 10'; Samir (yellow card) 37'; Zeegelaar (yellow card) 78'	Report	Bastoni (yellow card) 66'; Sensi (yellow card) 83'	Stadium: Stadio Friuli; Attendance: 0 Referee: Fabio Maresca

31 January 2021 20	Spezia	0–1	Udinese	La Spezia
12:30 CET (UTC+1)	Pobega (yellow card) 23'; Vignali (yellow card) 39'; Bastoni (yellow card) 66'; Acampora (yellow card) 68'; Saponara (yellow card) 81' (yellow-red card) 86'	Report	Bonifazi (yellow card) 16'; De Paul 52' (pen.), (yellow card) 71' (yellow-red card) 75'; De Maio (yellow card) 89'	Stadium: Stadio Alberto Picco; Attendance: 0 Referee: Antonio Di Martino

7 February 2021 21	Udinese	2–0	Hellas Verona	Udine
15:00 CET (UTC+1)	Llorente (yellow card) 25'; Arslan (yellow card) 31'; Silvestri 83' (o.g.); Deulofeu 90+1'	Report	Tameze (yellow card) 18'; Dawidowicz (yellow card) 24'; Zaccagni (yellow card) 35'; Faraoni (yellow card) 86'	Stadium: Stadio Friuli; Attendance: 0 Referee: Alberto Santoro

14 February 2021 22	Roma	3–0	Udinese	Rome
12:30 CET (UTC+1)	Veretout 5', 25' (pen.), (yellow card) 71'; Pellegrini (yellow card) 56'; Pedro 90+3'	Report		Stadium: Stadio Olimpico; Attendance: 0 Referee: Piero Giacomelli

21 February 2021 23	Parma	2–2	Udinese	Parma
12:30 CET (UTC+1)	Cornelius 3', (yellow card) 19'; Brugman (yellow card) 10'; Bani (yellow card) 29'; Kucka 32' (pen.); Mihăilă (yellow card) 37'; Hernani (yellow card) 59'; Conti (yellow card) 78'; Man (yellow card) 83'	Report	Zeegelaar (yellow card) 25'; Musso (yellow card) 37'; Okaka 64'; Nuytinck 80'; De Paul (yellow card) 81'; Pereyra (yellow card) 90+4'	Stadium: Stadio Ennio Tardini; Attendance: 0 Referee: Massimiliano Irrati

28 February 2021 24	Udinese	1–0	Fiorentina	Udine
15:00 CET (UTC+1)	Llorente (yellow card) 73'; Nestorovski 86'	Report	Martínez Quarta (yellow card) 64'; Kokorin (yellow card) 90+2'	Stadium: Stadio Friuli; Attendance: 0 Referee: Manuel Volpi

3 March 2021 25	Milan	1–1	Udinese	Milan
20:45 CET (UTC+1)	Rebić (yellow card) 24'; Hernandez (yellow card) 32'; Romagnoli (yellow card) 90+2'; Kessié (yellow card) 90+4', (goal) 90+7' (pen.)	Report	Zeegelaar (yellow card) 54'; Becão 68'	Stadium: San Siro; Attendance: 0 Referee: Davide Massa

6 March 2021 26	Udinese	2–0	Sassuolo	Udine
18:00 CET (UTC+1)	Llorente 42'; De Paul (yellow card) 53'; Pereyra 90+3'	Report		Stadium: Stadio Friuli; Attendance: 0 Referee: Lorenzo Maggioni

13 March 2021 27	Genoa	1–1	Udinese	Genoa
20:45 CET (UTC+1)	Pandev 8', (yellow card) 10'; Criscito (yellow card) 28'; Badelj (yellow card) 74'	Report	De Paul 30' (pen.); Nestorovski (yellow card) 90'	Stadium: Stadio Luigi Ferraris; Attendance: 0 Referee: Giacomo Camplone

21 March 2021 28	Udinese	0–1	Lazio	Udine
15:00 CET (UTC+1)	Molina (yellow card) 58'	Report	Marušić 37'; Patric (yellow card) 82'; Musacchio (yellow card) 87'; Pereira (yellow card) 90+2'	Stadium: Stadio Friuli; Attendance: 0 Referee: Fabio Maresca

3 April 2021 29	Atalanta	3–2	Udinese	Bergamo
15:00 CEST (UTC+2)	Muriel 19', 43'; Zapata 61'	Report	Pereyra 45', (yellow card) 58'; Stryger Larsen 71'; Samir (yellow card) 90'	Stadium: Gewiss Stadium; Attendance: 0 Referee: Gianluca Manganiello

10 April 2021 30	Udinese	0–1	Torino	Udine
20:45 CEST (UTC+2)		Report	Mandragora (yellow card) 40'; Buongiorno (yellow card) 49'; Belotti 61' (pen.); Zaza (yellow card) 90+2'	Stadium: Stadio Friuli; Attendance: 0 Referee: Daniele Doveri

17 April 2021 31	Crotone	1–2	Udinese	Crotone
15:00 CEST (UTC+2)	Simy 68' (pen.)	Report	De Paul 41', 74', (red card) 90+1'; Pereyra (yellow card) 48'; Forestieri (yellow card) 90+4'	Stadium: Stadio Ezio Scida; Attendance: 0 Referee: Luca Massimi

21 April 2021 32	Udinese	0–1	Cagliari	Udine
20:45 CEST (UTC+2)		Report	Pavoletti (yellow card) 45'; João Pedro 55' (pen.); Nainggolan (yellow card) 59'	Stadium: Stadio Friuli; Attendance: 0 Referee: Marco Guida

25 April 2021 33	Benevento	2–4	Udinese	Benevento
12:30 CEST (UTC+2)	Viola 34' (pen.); Schiattarella (yellow card) 81'; Lapadula 83'	Report	Molina 4'; Arslan 31'; Musso (yellow card) 33'; Stryger Larsen 49'; Walace (yellow card) 72'; Braaf 73'	Stadium: Stadio Ciro Vigorito; Attendance: 0 Referee: Maurizio Mariani

2 May 2021 34	Udinese	1–2	Juventus	Udine
18:00 CEST (UTC+2)	Molina 10'; Arslan (yellow card) 44'; Pereyra (yellow card) 55'; De Paul (yellow card) 83'	Report	Ronaldo 83' (pen.), 89'	Stadium: Stadio Friuli; Attendance: 0 Referee: Daniele Chiffi

8 May 2021 35	Udinese	1–1	Bologna	Udine
15:00 CEST (UTC+2)	De Paul 23'; Walace (yellow card) 66'	Report	Schouten (yellow card) 30'; Orsolini 82' (pen.)	Stadium: Stadio Friuli; Attendance: 0 Referee: Alberto Santoro

11 May 2021 36	Napoli	5–1	Udinese	Naples
20:45 CEST (UTC+2)	Zieliński 28'; Fabián 31'; Lozano 56'; Di Lorenzo 66'; Insigne 90+1'	Report	Okaka 41'; Bonifazi (yellow card) 54'	Stadium: Stadio San Paolo; Attendance: 0 Referee: Gianpaolo Calvarese

16 May 2021 37	Udinese	0–1	Sampdoria	Udine
15:00 CEST (UTC+2)	Okaka (yellow card) 67'; Walace (yellow card) 69'; Bonifazi (yellow card) 86'	Report	Thorsby (yellow card) 52'; Quagliarella 88' (pen.)	Stadium: Stadio Friuli; Attendance: 0 Referee: Matteo Gariglio

23 May 2021 38	Internazionale	5–1	Udinese	Milan
15:00 CEST (UTC+2)	Young 8'; Martínez (yellow card) 26', (goal) 55' (pen.); Eriksen 44'; Perišić 64'; Lukaku 71'	Report	Pereyra 79' (pen.)	Stadium: San Siro; Attendance: 0 Referee: Manuel Volpi

=== Coppa Italia ===
28 October 2020 Third round	Udinese	3–1	Vicenza	Udine
18:00 CET (UTC+1)	Forestieri 21', (yellow card) 90+5'; Deulofeu 60'; Pussetto 64'	Report	Barlocco (yellow card) 19'; Fantoni (yellow card) 74'; Zonta (yellow card) 75'; Gori 88'; Bizzotto (yellow card) 90+3'	Stadium: Dacia Arena; Referee: Antonio Rapuano

25 November 2020 Fourth round	Udinese	0–1 (a.e.t.)	Fiorentina	Udine
17:30 CET (UTC+1)	Samir (yellow card) 60'; Makengo (yellow card) 88'; Jajalo (yellow card) 99'	Report	Pulgar (yellow card) 34'; Cáceres (yellow card) 56'; Biraghi (yellow card) 90+2'; Montiel 112'	Stadium: Dacia Arena; Referee: Marco Serra

== Statistics ==
=== Appearances and goals ===
No.	Pos	Nat	Player	Total		Serie A		Coppa Italia	
No.	Pos	Nat	Player	Apps	Goals	Apps	Goals	Apps	Goals
Goalkeepers
1	GK	(Argentina) ARG	Juan Musso	36	0	35	0	1	0
31	GK	(Italy) ITA	Manuel Gasparini	1	0	0+1	0	0	0
96	GK	(Italy) ITA	Simone Scuffet	2	0	1	0	1	0
Defenders
3	DF	(Brazil) BRA	Samir	32	1	24+6	1	2	0
4	DF	(Austria) AUT	Sebastian Prödl	0	0	0	0	0	0
5	DF	(Netherlands) NED	Thomas Ouwejan	15	0	3+12	0	0	0
14	DF	(Italy) ITA	Kevin Bonifazi	32	0	28+2	0	2	0
16	DF	(Argentina) ARG	Nahuel Molina	31	2	18+11	2	1+1	0
17	DF	(Netherlands) NED	Bram Nuytinck	21	1	19+1	1	1	0
19	DF	(Denmark) DEN	Jens Stryger Larsen	35	2	30+3	2	1+1	0
50	DF	(Brazil) BRA	Rodrigo Becão	36	1	32+3	1	0+1	0
90	DF	(Netherlands) NED	Marvin Zeegelaar	25	1	23+1	1	1	0
87	DF	(France) FRA	Sebastian De Maio	16	0	9+6	0	0+1	0
Midfielders
6	MF	(France) FRA	Jean-Victor Makengo	19	0	5+12	0	2	0
8	MF	(Bosnia and Herzegovina) BIH	Mato Jajalo	2	0	0+1	0	0+1	0
11	MF	(Brazil) BRA	Walace	30	0	23+7	0	0	0
22	MF	(Germany) GER	Tolgay Arslan	31	3	25+5	3	0+1	0
29	MF	(Serbia) SRB	Petar Mićin	1	0	0+1	0	0	0
37	MF	(Argentina) ARG	Roberto Pereyra	35	5	34	5	1	0
64	MF	(Norway) NOR	Martin Palumbo	3	0	1+2	0	0	0
Forwards
7	FW	(Italy) ITA	Stefano Okaka	23	4	17+5	4	0+1	0
9	FW	(Spain) ESP	Gerard Deulofeu	15	2	7+6	1	2	1
10	FW	(Argentina) ARG	Rodrigo De Paul	38	9	36	9	2	0
21	FW	(Netherlands) NED	Jayden Braaf	4	1	1+3	1	0	0
23	FW	(Argentina) ARG	Ignacio Pussetto	13	4	9+2	3	1+1	1
30	FW	(North Macedonia) MKD	Ilija Nestorovski	23	2	4+18	2	1	0
32	FW	(Spain) ESP	Fernando Llorente	14	1	8+6	1	0	0
45	FW	(Italy) ITA	Fernando Forestieri	21	2	3+16	1	2	1
Players transferred out during the season
15	FW	(Italy) ITA	Kevin Lasagna	18	2	12+5	2	1	0
18	DF	(Netherlands) NED	Hidde ter Avest	6	0	4+2	0	0	0
38	MF	(Italy) ITA	Rolando Mandragora	10	0	3+7	0	0	0
88	GK	(Brazil) BRA	Nícolas	2	0	2	0	0	0
99	MF	(Senegal) SEN	Mamadou Coulibaly	4	0	2+1	0	0+1	0

Last updated: 23 May 2021
Source: Competitions

=== Goalscorers ===
As of 31 January 2021

Rank	No.	Pos	Nat	Name	Serie A	Coppa Italia	Total
1	10	MF	(Argentina)	Rodrigo De Paul	5	0	5
2	23	FW	(Argentina)	Ignacio Pussetto	3	1	4
3	7	FW	(Italy)	Stefano Okaka	2	0	2
3	15	FW	(Italy)	Kevin Lasagna	2	0	2
3	22	MF	(Germany)	Tolgay Arslan	2	0	2
3	37	MF	(Argentina)	Roberto Pereyra	2	0	2
3	45	FW	(Italy)	Fernando Forestieri	1	1	2
8	3	DF	(Brazil)	Samir	1	0	1
8	9	FW	(Spain)	Gerard Deulofeu	0	1	1
8	30	FW	(North Macedonia)	Ilija Nestorovski	1	0	1
8	90	DF	(Netherlands)	Marvin Zeegelaar	1	0	1
Own goal					1	0	1
Totals					21	3	24
