= Tisci =

Tisci is an Italian surname. Notable people with the surname include:

- Ivan Tisci (born 1974), Italian footballer
- Riccardo Tisci (born 1974), Italian fashion designer
