= Luca Petrungaro =

Italian footballer

Personal information
- Date of birth: 30 January 2000 (age 26)
- Place of birth: Rome, Italy
- Height: 1.74 m (5 ft 9 in)
- Position: Forward

Team information
- Current team: Potenza
- Number: 30

Youth career
- –2018: Roma
- 2018–2019: Torino

Senior career*
Years	Team	Apps	(Gls)
2019–2023	AlbinoLeffe	82	(2)
2023–2024	Pro Sesto	12	(0)
2024	→ Fermana (loan)	16	(2)
2024–2025	Messina	20	(4)
2025–	Potenza	46	(7)

International career^{‡}
2016	Italy U17	1	(0)
- * Club domestic league appearances and goals as of 1 May 2026 ‡ National team caps and goals as of 7 March 2020

Luca Petrungaro (born 30 January 2000) is an Italian professional footballer who plays as a forward for Serie C Group C club Potenza.

== Career ==
=== Early career ===
In February 2017, reported interest was shown in Petrungaro by Manchester City and Red Bull Salzburg, although a move never materialized. In September 2018, Petrungaro moved to Torino's youth system after falling out of favor in Rome.

=== AlbinoLeffe ===
Prior to the 2019–20 season, Petrungaro moved to Serie C club AlbinoLeffe, with Torino incorporating a buy-back clause into the contract. He made his league debut for the club on 29 September 2019, coming on as a 77th-minute substitute for Francesco Gelli in a 1–0 away defeat to Novara.
