= Nicolò Bruschi =

Italian footballer

Personal information
- Date of birth: 12 August 1998 (age 28)
- Place of birth: Parma, Italy
- Height: 1.78 m (5 ft 10 in)
- Position: Winger

Team information
- Current team: Potenza
- Number: 92

Youth career
- –2015: Parma
- 2015–2018: Sassuolo

Senior career*
Years	Team	Apps	(Gls)
2017–2018	→ Santarcangelo (loan)	5	(0)
2018	→ Cuneo (loan)	13	(1)
2018–2019	Arezzo	9	(0)
2019	→ Gozzano (loan)	10	(0)
2019	Chieti	13	(1)
2019–2020	Vado	12	(4)
2020–2021	Fiorenzuola	33	(30)
2021–2022	Pisa	0	(0)
2021–2022	→ Fiorenzuola (loan)	31	(3)
2022–2024	Pro Sesto	52	(16)
2024–2025	Monopoli	33	(5)
2025–	Potenza	13	(2)
- * Club domestic league appearances and goals as of 1 May 2026

Nicolò Bruschi (born 12 August 1998) is an Italian professional footballer who plays as a winger for Serie C Group C club Potenza.

== Club career ==
Bruschi scored 15 goals in 33 appearances for Fiorenzuola on 2020–21 Serie D season, the club won the Group and was promoted to Serie C. After the campaign, Bruschi was signed by Pisa, and loaned to Fiorenzuola for the 2021–2022 season.

On 22 July 2022, Bruschi signed with Pro Sesto.

On 27 July 2024, Bruschi joined Monopoli on a two-year contract.
