= Tommaso Cucchietti =

Italian football player

Personal information
- Date of birth: 24 January 1998 (age 28)
- Place of birth: Turin, Italy
- Height: 1.89 m (6 ft 2 1/2 in)
- Position: Goalkeeper

Team information
- Current team: Potenza
- Number: 24

Youth career
- –2017: Torino

Senior career*
Years	Team	Apps	(Gls)
2016–2020	Torino	0	(0)
2017–2018	→ Reggina (loan)	34	(0)
2018–2019	→ Alessandria (loan)	31	(0)
2019–2020	→ Südtirol (loan)	20	(0)
2020–2021	Gubbio	18	(0)
2021–2023	Lucchese	36	(0)
2023–2024	Foggia	0	(0)
2024–	Potenza	28	(0)

International career
2014	Italy U16	4	(0)
2014–2015	Italy U17	9	(0)
2015–2016	Italy U18	4	(0)
2016	Italy U19	3	(0)
- * Club domestic league appearances and goals as of 1 May 2026

Tommaso Cucchietti (born 24 January 1998) is an Italian professional footballer who plays as a goalkeeper for Serie C Group C club Potenza.

== Club career ==
=== Torino ===
Cucchetti is a youth product of Torino youth team. He made several appearances on the bench for almost the entire 2016–17 season, but he never appear on the field.

==== Loan to Reggina ====
On 13 July 2017, Cucchietti was loaned to Serie C club Reggina on a season-long loan deal. On 2 September he made his professional debut for Reggina in Serie C in a 1–0 away defeat against Catanzaro. On 23 September he kept his first clean sheet for the team in a 1–0 away win over Fondi. Three weeks later, on 14 October, he kept his second clean sheet for the club in a 2–0 home win over Fidelis Andria and, three more weeks later, on 4 November, he kept his third clean sheet in a 0–0 away draw against Casertana. On 26 March 2018, Cucchietti kept his 10th clean sheet of the season for Reggina in a 0–0 away draw against Siracusa. Cucchietti ended his loan to Reggina with 34 appearances, 11 clean sheets and 36 goals conceded.

==== Loan to Alessandria ====
On 28 July 2018, Cucchietti was signed by Serie C side Alessandria on a season-long loan. One day later, on 29 July, he made his debut for the club in a 1–0 home defeat against Giana Erminio in the first round of Coppa Italia. On 16 September he made his Serie C debut for Alessandria in a 2–1 away win over Juventus U23. Two weeks later, on 30 September, Cucchietti kept his first clean sheet in a 0–0 home draw against Lucchese. One more week later, on 7 October, he kept his second consecutive clean sheet, a 0–0 away draw against Pisa and, ten days later, on 17 October, he kept his third clean sheet, another 0–0 draw against Olbia. Cucchietti ended his loan to Alessandria with 32 appearances, 42 goals conceded and 8 clean sheets.

==== Loan to Südtirol ====
On 26 July 2019, Cuccchietti was loaned to Serie C club Südtirol on a season-long loan deal. One week later, on 4 August, he made his debut for the club in a 4–2 home win over Città di Fasano in the first round of Coppa Italia. On 25 August, Cucchietti made his league debut in a 2–1 away win over Vis Pesaro. On 21 September he kept his first clean sheet for the club in a 1–0 away win against Arzignano Valchiampo. Four days later, on 25 September, he kept his second clean sheet in a 3–0 home win over Fermana and four more days later, on 29 September, his third consecutive in a 2–0 away win over Alma Juventus Fano. Cucchietti ended his season-long loan to Südtirol with 24 appearances, 26 goals conceded and 9 clean sheet.

=== Gubbio ===
On 19 August 2020, Cucchietti joined to Serie C club Gubbio on an undisclosed fee and he signed a 2-year contract. Five weeks later, on 27 September, he made his debut for the club as a starter in a 2–0 home defeat against Modena. One month later, on 25 October he kept his first clean sheet for the club in a 0–0 home draw over Legnago Salus. On 21 November, Cucchietti kept his second clean sheet for Gubbio in a 0–0 away draw against Perugia and two days later his third in a 1–0 home win over Triestina.

=== Lucchese ===
On 11 August 2021, he signed a two-year contract with Lucchese. He started the 2020–21 season as a back-up to Jacopo Coletta, appearing only once in the first 15 games of the season and allowing 3 goals in that game.

=== Foggia ===
On 4 August 2023, Cucchietti joined Foggia on a one-year deal.

== International career ==
Cucchietti represented Italy from Under-16 to Under-19 level. On 11 March 2014 he made his debut at Under-16 level in a 2–1 away win over Croatia U-16, one month later he kept his first clean sheet at this level in a 3–0 home win over Poland U-16. On 27 August 2014, Cucchietti made his debut and kept his clean sheet at Under-17 level in a 0–0 away draw against Portugal U-17. Cucchetti, with Italy U-17, played also 2 matches in the 2015 UEFA European Under-17 Championship qualification against Slovakia U-17 and Germany U-17. On 16 September 2015 he made his debut at U-18 level in a 3–2 away defeat against Czech Republic U-18. On 11 August 2016, Cucchietti made his debut at U-19 level, as a substitute replacing Mattia Del Favero in a 1–0 away defeat against Croatia U-19.

== Career statistics ==
=== Club ===
As of match played 25 September 2021

Club	Season	League			National cup		League cup		Other		Total	
Club	Season	League	Apps	Goals	Apps	Goals	Apps	Goals	Apps	Goals	Apps	Goals
Reggina (loan)	2017–18	Serie C	34	0	0	0	1	0	—		35	0
Alessandria (loan)	2018–19	Serie C	31	0	1	0	—		—		32	0
Südtirol (loan)	2019–20	Serie C	20	0	3	0	—		1 (Note: All appearance(s) in Serie C play-off.)	0	24	0
Gubbio	2020–21	Serie C	18	0	0	0	—		—		18	0
Lucchese	2021–22	Serie C	1	0	0	0	—		—		1	0
Career total			104	0	4	0	1	0	1	0	110	0

== Honours ==
=== Club ===
Torino Primavera

- Supercoppa Primavera: 2015
