= Jacopo Murano =

Italian footballer

Personal information
- Full name: Jacopo Pietro Murano
- Date of birth: 14 February 1990 (age 36)
- Place of birth: Potenza, Italy
- Height: 1.86 m (6 ft 1 in)
- Position: Striker

Team information
- Current team: Potenza
- Number: 9

Senior career*
Years	Team	Apps	(Gls)
2008–2009	Sporting Genzano	28	(4)
2009–2010	Campobasso	28	(4)
2010–2011	Taranto	1	(0)
2011	→ San Marino (loan)	7	(1)
2011–2012	Montichiari	19	(3)
2012–2013	Brindisi	0	(0)
2013–2014	Potenza		(7)
2014–2015	Monopoli	29	(4)
2015	Grosseto	10	(2)
2015–2016	Recanatese	16	(9)
2016–2017	Savona	33	(2)
2017–2019	SPAL	0	(0)
2017–2018	→ Trapani (loan)	33	(10)
2019–2020	Potenza	32	(9)
2020–2022	Perugia	45	(12)
2022–2023	Avellino	28	(2)
2023	→ Potenza (loan)	13	(3)
2023–2024	Picerno	36	(20)
2024–2025	Foggia	21	(3)
2025	→ Crotone (loan)	12	(5)
2025–2026	Crotone	18	(4)
2026–	Potenza	13	(0)
- * Club domestic league appearances and goals as of 1 May 2026

Jacopo Pietro Murano (born 14 February 1990) is an Italian professional footballer who plays as a striker for Serie C Group C club Potenza.

== Career ==
On 17 January 2019, he was released from his contract with SPAL by mutual consent.

On 22 February 2019, he joined Serie C club Potenza. He has previously helped the club get promoted in the 2013–14 season from the fifth-tier Eccellenza to Serie D by scoring 37 goals in the league (with 5 additional in Coppa Italia).

On 17 September 2020 he signed with Perugia.

On 22 January 2022 he joined Avellino. On 26 January 2023, Murano returned to Potenza on loan.

On 23 August 2024, Murano signed a two-season contract with Foggia.
