= Pro Sesto 1913 =

Italian football club

Pro Sesto
- Full name: Pro Sesto Calcio s.r.l.
- Founded: 1913; 113 years ago 1927; 99 years ago , 1945; 81 years ago , 2010; 16 years ago (refounded)
- Ground: Stadio Breda, Sesto San Giovanni, Italy
- Capacity: 4,500
- Owners: Professional Football Investments ltd
- Chairman: Gabriele Albertini
- Manager: Daniele Angellotti
- League: Serie D
- 2023–24: Serie C Group A, 19th of 20 (relegated)
Home colours	Away colours

Pro Sesto 1913 S.r.l. (formerly Associazione Sportiva Dilettantistica Nuova Pro Sesto and initially Associazione Calcio Pro Sesto) is an association football club, based in Sesto San Giovanni, Lombardy, Italy. Pro Sesto currently plays in Serie D, having last been in Serie B in 1950.

== History ==
=== Foundation and beginnings (1913–1915) ===
In the early twentieth century, football made its appearance in the Milanese hinterland, parallel to the birth of large heavy industry.

In 1913, thanks to the economic effort of some fans of this new sport, the Società Ginnico Sportiva Pro Sesto (en: Pro Sesto Gymnastic Society) was born.

At the helm of the newborn association is placed Iginio Trasi who in addition to the function of president also carries out the role of coach, teaching the principles of this sport to young people recruited in the streets of the city.

Financial problems pushed managers to save on game uniforms: to insert the light blue on the white shirts, the players were forced to sew a horizontal band of fabric.

Pro Sesto joined the Italian Football Federation in 1914 by enrolling in the Third Category Regional Championship organized by the Lombardy Regional Committee, obtaining a flattering 3rd place for a novice club.

The first official match, certified by the Federation, played by Pro Sesto is dated January 17, 1915, when the Sestesi faced the Lombard National Team; the match ended 2–1 in favor of the biancocelesti.

=== The First World War and the first dissolution (1915–1922) ===
With the outbreak of the First World War, it was interrupted all types of sporting activities from 1915 until 1919 when, thanks to the commitment of the new president Guido Tozzi, Pro Sesto re-entered in the Lombard championships, participating in the Group B of Promozione 1919/20 and immediately being promoted to the First Category, the highest level of the archaic Italian football championship.

For the club, the financial commitment is too high and, once the championship was over, the club doesn't continue sporting activity after the 1921/22 season; all football players were almost equally divided between the two other teams remained in activity of the city: Gruppo Sportivo Marelli and Gruppo Sportivo Breda.

=== The first refoundation and the second dissolution (1927–1928) ===
The club was reconstituted at the beginning of the 1927/1928 season, thanks to the support of over two hundred members, with the name of Unione Sportiva Pro Sesto, starting from the Fourth Division in the last season in which the Lombardy Regional Directorate had to organize it before its definitive deletion.

The season, however, went very badly, with sixth place in the standings out of eight teams; at the end of the season, the Fascist regime imposed the merger with Gruppo Sportivo Breda, disappearing from the national football scene.

=== After the Second World War and the second refoundation, Serie B and decline (1945–1963) ===
Eraldo Monzeglio in 1934 with Italy National Team shirt

From the ashes of the two local club: Giovani Calciatori Sestesi and Dopolavoro Acciaierie Falck with two consecutive mergers, the club reborns again with the name Unione Sportiva Pro Sesto. It acquires the sports rights from Dopolavoro Acciaierie Falck and it was admitted to the mixed Serie B/C Championship.

In the 1946/47 season, under the guidance of coach Eraldo Monzeglio, the team finished in the eleventh place, obtaining a prestigious success against Como and winning all the Milanese derbies within the friendly walls, except for the match against Seregno (Lombardy), lost 1-0.

In the following season (1947/48), the Federation re-dimensioned the cadres: from three groups of 18 teams to a single group of 22 teams; to be saved, was necessary to reach seventh place; Pro Sesto reaches the last place available to remain in the cadet championship but in cohabitation with Crema. The two teams met in Melzo on 4 July 1948 and Pro Sesto won 2–1.

The 1948/49 season was their best ever in Serie B; at the end of an over the top championship, the Biancocelesti finished in seventh position, behind Legnano, Spal, Alessandria and Hellas Verona; it was an exceptional result for the bigger blazon of the opponents.

Subsequently, within three years, Pro Sesto will return to the regional promotion championship.

In 1963, following the merger with AC Sestese, the team took the name of Associazione Calcio Pro Sesto.

=== Amateurism and return to professionalism (1963–1990) ===
The Peduzzi, Pasini and Fontana era began in 1985, a presidential triad that with the coach Alfredo Spada, in 1987, won promotion to Serie C2 and Pro Sesto returned to the professionals. The strength of the Peduzzi/Pasini tandem allows the Biancocelesti to reach another important milestone: in 1990, with Gianfranco Motta as coach, the Biancocelesti conquer the Serie C1 and return to play with high-ranking opponents such as Bologna, Como, Monza, Empoli, Venezia and Vicenza. A period characterized by great satisfactions, including participation in Coppa Italia of Lega Nazionale Professionisti.

=== 20 years of professionalism and a third dissolution (1990–2010) ===
Pro Sesto regularly participates in the professional championship, alternating between Serie C1 and Serie C2.

At the beginning of the new millennium, the team relegated to Serie C2; Serie C1 is regained on the pitch at the end of the 2004/05 championship.

In the following tournament, however, after a good start, it ends up in the play-outs and, losing them, he immediately returns to C2; the president Luca Pasini thinks not to enroll the team, fortunately the entry of the municipality of Sesto San Giovanni within the association allows the continuation of the adventure. Pasini therefore prepares the documents for the repechage in the third series; strong of the first place in the merit rankings, Pro Sesto therefore remains in C1.

In 2006/07, Pro Sesto did a championship with ups and downs characterized by a strong leveling down brings Pro Sesto back to the play-out, against Ivrea. The Lombards do not make mistakes like the year before and with the double result of 0-0, 1-0 push the Ivrea players to C2 conquering a tiring salvation.

In the 2007/08 championship, the biancocelesti start well with the victory at home against Foggia and a draw in Verona with Hellas, but they pass from a black period of 5 consecutive defeats blocked by 2–1 at home with Padova, the team after Robert Maah's injury gets a series of ups and downs that will lead her to fight for salvation.

However, the relegation to Lega Pro Second Division, formerly Serie C2, comes the following year when Pro Sesto is ranked 14th and loses the play-outs against Venice; in the 2009/10 season it's relegated to Serie D; the club went bankrupt and its affiliation with the FIGC was revoked.

=== The third refoundation and the return to professionals (2010–2024) ===
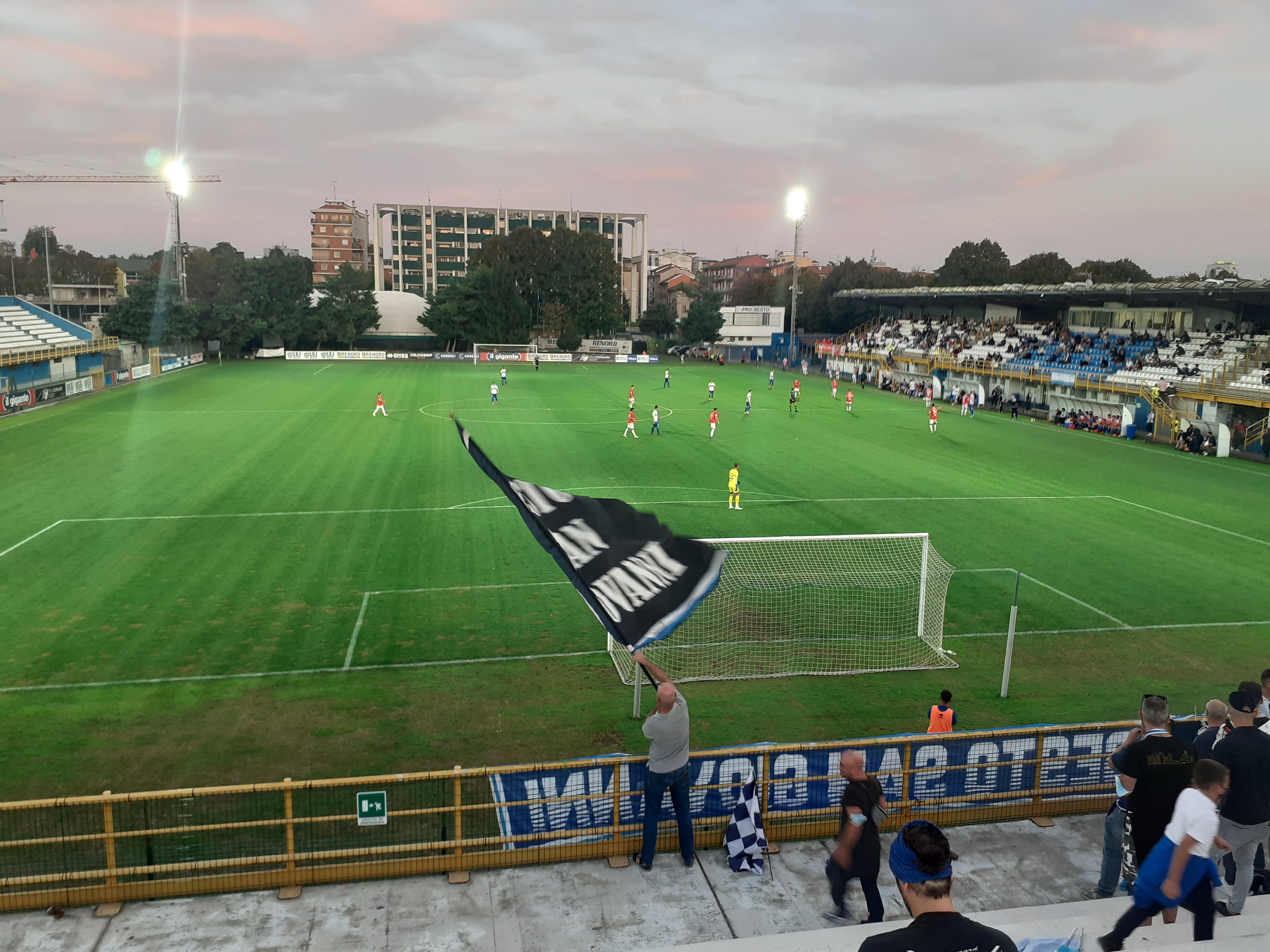
Pro Sesto-Triestina in 2021, view from Curva Vito Porro

In the summer 2010 after the relegation from Lega Pro Seconda Divisione the former club went bankrupt.

The club was refounded in 2010 as Associazione Sportiva Dilettantistica Nuova Pro Sesto coming immediately promoted from Promozione Lombardy/C to Eccellenza Lombardy.

In the summer 2011 it has changed its denomination in the current. In this season it was promoted from Eccellenza Lombardy/A to Serie D.

In 2020 Pro Sesto won Group B of Serie D Championship which ended prematurely due to covid emergency with the direct clash with Legnano won 3–2 and was promoted to Serie C.

With the return to professional football, the club is renamed Pro Sesto 1913 S.r.l.; the season ended with the team who remain in Serie C for the season 2021/22, arrived at the 17th place.

In the 2021/22 season, Pro Sesto ended the championship again at 17th place, but it remained in Serie C thanks to the win of Playout against Seregno (Lombardy).

== Colors and badge ==
The team's colors are white and blue.

== Current squad ==
As of 16 July 2024.

Note: Flags indicate national team as defined under FIFA eligibility rules; some limited exceptions apply. Players may hold more than one non-FIFA nationality.

No.	Pos.	Nation	Player
3	DF	ITA	Emanuele Maurizii
7	MF	ITA	Alessandro Sala
10	MF	FRA	Mohamed Bahlouli
11	FW	NOR	Julian Kristoffersen
12	GK	ITA	Simone Formosa
16	MF	ITA	Andrea Poli
21	MF	ITA	Andrea Bussaglia

No.	Pos.	Nation	Player
25	MF	ITA	Riccardo Boscolo Chio
26	MF	ITA	Lorenzo Ferro
33	DF	ITA	Andrea Poggesi
50	DF	ITA	Luca Iotti
98	FW	ITA	Nicolò Bruschi
—	MF	ITA	Luca Petrungaro
—	DF	ITA	Alessandro Santambrogio

== Notable former players ==
International

- (The Gambia) Simon Barjie
- (Philippines) Simone Rota
- (Dominican Republic) Andrea Bosco
- (Algeria) Abdelkader Ghezzal
- (Slovenia) Matjaž Florijančič

Notable

- (Italy) Mauro Boerchio
- (Italy) Filippo Galli
- (Italy) Fulvio Saini
- (Italy) Stefano Eranio

== Youth section ==
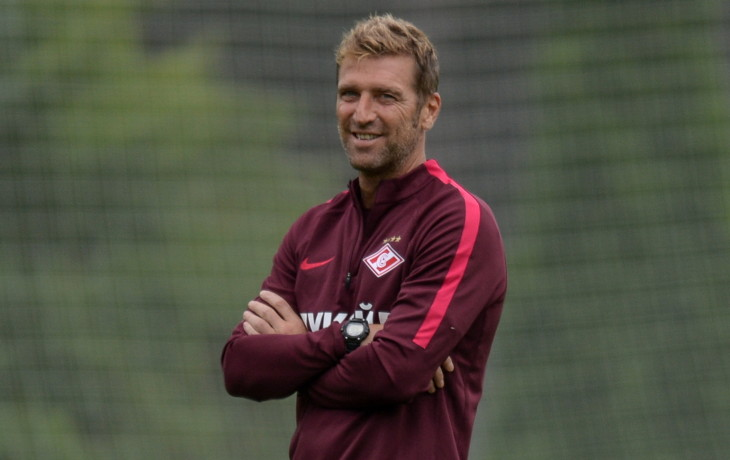
Massimo Carrera in 2016

Two youth teams of Pro Sesto have won the title of Champion of Italy in their respective category.

In the 1989/1990 season, the Allievi Nazionali won the championship reserved for the youth teams of Serie C1 and Serie C2.

In the 2007/2008 season it was the turn of the Berretti team, who won in the final against Pescara (victory 4-0 in the first leg and defeat 3-1 in the second leg) after eliminating Monza in the semifinals.

From the 2015/2016 season, Pro Sesto youth sector includes the Scuola Calcio and Primi Calci, Pulcini, Esordienti (Regional and National Youths), Allievi (Regional and National) and Juniores.

In Pro Sesto's youth sector played the entrepreneur Urbano Cairo and the former Formula 1 racing driver Ivan Capelli; players such as Cristian Brocchi, Francesco Parravicini, Fabio Macellari and Massimo Carrera came out of youth sector.
