= Francesco Intinacelli =

Italian footballer

Personal information
- Date of birth: 12 November 2001 (age 25)
- Place of birth: Chieti, Italy
- Height: 1.73 m (5 ft 8 in)
- Position: Forward

Team information
- Current team: Savoia
- Number: 32

Youth career
- 2016–2020: Ascoli

Senior career*
Years	Team	Apps	(Gls)
2020–2022	Ascoli	1	(0)
2020–2021	→ Fermana (loan)	1	(0)
2021–2022	→ Montevarchi (loan)	18	(1)
2022	Casale	8	(1)
2022–2023	Gravina	20	(0)
2023–2024	Notaresco	5	(0)
2024	Sarnese	7	(0)
2024–	Savoia	1	(0)
- * Club domestic league appearances and goals as of 17 November 2024

Francesco Intinacelli (born 12 November 2001) is an Italian footballer who plays for Serie D club Savoia.

== Club career ==
He made his Serie B debut for Ascoli on 17 June 2020 in a game against Cremonese.

On 5 October 2020 he joined Serie C club Fermana on loan. He only made one substitute appearance for Fermana in the first half of the season, and on 8 January 2021 his loan was terminated and he returned to Ascoli, where he was assigned to the Under-19 squad.

On 27 August 2021 he extended his contract for Ascoli until 2023; on the same day he went to Montevarchi on loan.

On 9 September 2022, Intinacelli moved to Casale in Serie D.

== Club statistics ==
=== Club ===
As of match played 23 February 2022

Club	Season	League			Cup		Other		Total	
Club	Season	Division	Apps	Goals	Apps	Goals	Apps	Goals	Apps	Goals
Ascoli	2019–20	Serie B	1	0	0	0	0	0	1	0
Fermana (loan)	2020–21	Serie C	1	0	0	0	0	0	1	0
Montevarchi (loan)	2021–22	Serie C	17	1	0	0	0	0	17	1
Career total			19	1	0	0	0	0	19	1
