= Ivan Tisci =

Italian footballer

Personal information
- Date of birth: 22 March 1974 (age 52)
- Place of birth: Genoa, Italy
- Height: 1.75 m (5 ft 9 in)
- Position: Midfielder

Team information
- Current team: Potenza (head coach)

Senior career*
Years	Team	Apps	(Gls)
1993–1994	Genoa	1	(0)
1994–1995	Cosenza	3	(0)
1995	Ospitaletto	10	(1)
1995–1996	Savoia	28	(2)
1996–1997	Sora	30	(1)
1997–2002	Pescara	81	(8)
1999	→ Vicenza (loan)	6	(0)
1999–2000	→ Savoia (loan)	18	(1)
2002–2003	Lanciano	29	(5)
2003–2004	Avellino	45	(8)
2004–2007	Modena	85	(5)
2007	Crotone	13	(1)
2007–2008	Foggia	21	(4)
2008	Paganese	12	(4)
2009	Lanciano	15	(4)
2009–2010	Avellino	13	(0)
2010	Sambonifacese	13	(0)

Managerial career
- 2022: Bisceglie
- 2022–2023: Fasano
- 2023–2024: Audace Cerignola
- 2024–2026: Pineto
- 2026–: Potenza
- * Club domestic league appearances and goals

Ivan Tisci (born 22 March 1974) is an Italian football coach and former midfielder. He is the head coach of Serie C Group C club Potenza.

Tisci played for nine seasons in Serie B and briefly also played in Serie A.

== Playing career ==
In June 2004, Tisci joined Modena on free transfer.

After the relegation of Crotone from Serie B, he joined Foggia of Serie C1 on a 1-year contract.

In August 2009, he was signed by Avellino which recently relegated to Serie D.

== Coaching career ==
After a couple experiences as a technical collaborator for Benevento and Empoli, on 11 April 2022 Tisci took on his first head coaching role at Serie D relegation-struggling club Bisceglie. After failing to save Bisceglie from relegation to Eccellenza, Tisci signed for fellow Apulian Serie D club Fasano.

After a successful season at Fasano, Tisci was subsequently hired by Serie C club Audace Cerignola for the 2023–24 season. He was dismissed on 11 March 2024.

On 10 October 2024, Tisci was appointed as the new head coach of Serie C club Pineto, replacing Mirko Cudini.

In July 2026, Tisci was appointed head coach of Potenza Calcio.
