= Jan Kubala =

Czech footballer

Personal information
- Date of birth: 5 May 2000 (age 26)
- Place of birth: Frýdek-Místek, Czech Republic
- Height: 1.83 m (6 ft 0 in)
- Position: Left wing-back

Youth career
- ???–2016: Frýdek-Místek
- 2016–2017: Baník Ostrava
- 2017–2020: Udinese

Senior career*
Years	Team	Apps	(Gls)
2019–2022	Udinese	0	(0)
2020	→ Slavoj Vyšehrad (loan)	9	(0)
2022	Baník Ostrava	0	(0)
2022	→ Vyškov (loan)	7	(0)
Total		16	(0)
- * Club domestic league appearances and goals

Jan Kubala (born 5 May 2000) is a former Czech footballer who played as a left wing-back.

== Club career ==
Born in Frýdek-Místek, Kubala started playing football at his local club, where he won the Nike Premier Cup in 2015. The following year, he joined Baník Ostrava's youth sector, where he played for one year before signing for Serie A side Udinese in 2017.

Although he primarily featured for the Under-19 squad, Kubala also received several call-ups to the Italian club's first team: however, he never made his senior debut for Udinese.

In 2020, the player was sent on loan to Czech National Football League side Slavoj Vyšehrad.

After playing one more season for Udinese's Under-19s as an over-age player, on 16 June 2022 Kubala officially returned to Baník Ostrava, where he signed a one-year contract with an option for another year.

In November 2022, after he spent the autumn on loan in MFK Vyškov, Kubala decided to end his professional career and go to study.

== International career ==
Kubala has been a youth international for the Czech Republic, having represented his country at under-17 and under-18 levels.
