= Gianluca D'Auria =

Italian footballer (born 1996)

Personal information
- Date of birth: 28 October 1996 (age 30)
- Place of birth: Naples, Italy
- Height: 1.72 m (5 ft 8 in)
- Position: Winger

Team information
- Current team: Potenza
- Number: 10

Youth career
- –2014: Inter
- 2012–2014: → Napoli (loan)
- 2014–2015: Napoli

Senior career*
Years	Team	Apps	(Gls)
2014–2015	→ Neapolis (loan)	26	(1)
2015–2016	Francavilla	34	(9)
2016–2017	Monopoli	12	(1)
2017	→ Lucchese (loan)	5	(0)
2017–2018	Juve Stabia	9	(0)
2018–2019	Francavilla	32	(12)
2019–2020	Siena	19	(5)
2020–2023	Carrarese	46	(4)
2023	Imolese	15	(1)
2023–2024	Turris	29	(6)
2024–	Potenza	47	(15)
- * Club domestic league appearances and goals as of 1 May 2026

Gianluca D'Auria (born 28 October 1996) is an Italian professional footballer who plays as a winger for Serie C Group C club Potenza.

== Club career ==
On 12 January 2023, D'Auria joined Imolese.

On 18 July 2023, D'Auria signed a two-year contract with Turris.

On 16 July 2024, Prezioso moved to Potenza.
