= Davide Di Francesco =

Italian footballer (born 2001)

Personal information
- Date of birth: 19 January 2001 (age 25)
- Place of birth: Sant'Omero, Italy
- Height: 1.79 m (5 ft 10 in)
- Position: Winger

Team information
- Current team: Monterosi
- Number: 8

Youth career
- –2020: Ascoli
- 2018–2019: → Juventus (loan)

Senior career*
| Years | Team | Apps | (Gls) |
| 2019–2022 | Ascoli | 0 | (0) |
| 2019–2020 | → Alma Juventus Fano (loan) | 16 | (1) |
| 2020–2021 | → Teramo (loan) | 22 | (2) |
| 2021–2022 | → Campobasso (loan) | 19 | (4) |
| 2022– | Monterosi | 30 | (2) |

International career^{‡}
| 2017 | Italy U17 | 2 | (1) |
| 2018–2019 | Italy U18 | 2 | (1) |
- * Club domestic league appearances and goals as of 6 May 2024 ‡ National team caps and goals as of 20 February 2019

Davide Di Francesco (born 19 January 2001) is an Italian professional footballer who plays as a winger for Monterosi.

== Club career ==
On 21 July 2022, Di Francesco signed with Monterosi.

== Career statistics ==
As of match played 24 April 2022

Appearances and goals by club, season and competition
| Club | Season | League | | | National Cup | | Other | | Total | |
| Club | Season | Division | Apps | Goals | Apps | Goals | Apps | Goals | Apps | Goals |
|---|---|---|---|---|---|---|---|---|---|---|
| Ascoli | 2019–20 | Serie B | 0 | 0 | 0 | 0 | — | | 0 | 0 |
| Alma Juventus Fano(loan) | 2019–20 | Serie C | 16 | 1 | 0 | 0 | — | | 16 | 1 |
| Teramo(loan) | 2020–21 | Serie C | 22 | 2 | 1 | 0 | — | | 23 | 2 |
| Campobasso (loan) | 2021–22 | Serie C | 20 | 4 | 0 | 0 | — | | 20 | 4 |
| Career total | | | 58 | 7 | 1 | 0 | 0 | 0 | 59 | 7 |
