= Stadio Alfredo Viviani =

Multi-use stadium in Potenza, Italy

Coordinates: 40°38′02.88″N 15°48′15.54″E

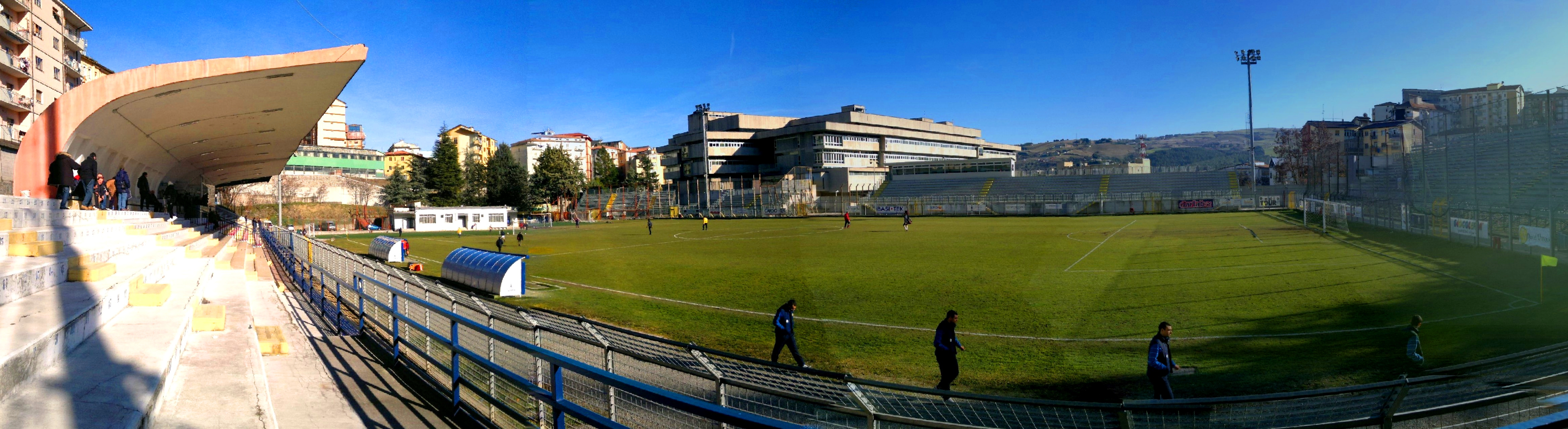
- Interactive map of Stadio Alfredo Viviani
- Location: Potenza, Italy
- Owner: Municipality of Potenza
- Capacity: 6,000
- Surface: Grass; 110x70m

Tenants
- Potenza S.C. (?–2011); Città di Potenza S.S. (2012–2013); Potenza Calcio (since 2013)

Stadio Alfredo Viviani is a multi-use stadium in Potenza, Italy. It is used mostly for association football matches and is the home ground of Potenza Calcio. The stadium holds 6,000 people.
