= Matteo Pedrini =

Italian footballer

Personal information
- Date of birth: 16 January 2000 (age 26)
- Place of birth: Bergamo, Italy
- Height: 1.80 m (5 ft 11 in)
- Position: Forward

Team information
- Current team: Atletico Ascoli

Youth career
- –2015: Renate
- 2015–2018: Atalanta

Senior career*
Years	Team	Apps	(Gls)
2018–2022	Atalanta	0	(0)
2018–2019	→ Rezzato (loan)	21	(2)
2019–2020	→ Giana Erminio (loan)	15	(1)
2020–2021	→ Grosseto (loan)	13	(1)
2021	→ Bisceglie (loan)	9	(0)
2021–2022	→ Mantova (loan)	14	(0)
2022–2023	Mantova	1	(0)
2023	Virtus	12	(3)
2023	Tivoli	8	(0)
2023–	Atletico Ascoli	2	(0)
- * Club domestic league appearances and goals as of 20 December 2023

Matteo Pedrini (born 16 January 2000) is an Italian footballer who plays as a forward for Serie D club Atletico Ascoli.

== Club career ==
He played in the 2018–19 season in Serie D for Rezzato.

On 17 July 2019, he joined Serie C club Giana Erminio on a season-long loan.

He made his professional Serie C debut for Giana Erminio on 25 August 2019 in a game against Renate. He started the game and played 73 minutes. He scored his first professional goal in the next game on 1 September 2019 against Olbia.

On 31 August 2020, he joined Grosseto on loan. On 13 January 2021, he moved on a new loan to Bisceglie. On 13 July 2021, he was loaned to Mantova.
