= Federico Ermacora =

Italian footballer (born 2000)

Personal information
- Date of birth: 6 March 2000 (age 26)
- Place of birth: Udine, Italy
- Height: 1.79 m (5 ft 10 in)
- Position: Defender

Youth career
- –2019: Udinese

Senior career*
| Years | Team | Apps | (Gls) |
| 2019–2021 | Udinese | 0 | (0) |
| 2019–2020 | → Triestina (loan) | 7 | (0) |
| 2020–2021 | → Carrarese (loan) | 26 | (0) |
| 2021–2023 | Renate | 49 | (1) |

International career^{‡}
| 2015 | Italy U15 | 3 | (0) |
| 2015–2016 | Italy U16 | 6 | (0) |
| 2016 | Italy U17 | 1 | (0) |
| 2017 | Italy U18 | 1 | (0) |
- * Club domestic league appearances and goals as of 22 April 2023 ‡ National team caps and goals as of 9 August 2017

Federico Ermacora (born 6 March 2000) is an Italian footballer who plays as a defender.

== Club career ==
He is a product of Udinese youth system and started playing for their Under-19 squad in the 2016–17 season.

On 15 July 2019, he joined Serie C club Triestina on a season-long loan. He made his professional Serie C debut for Triestina on 24 November 2019 in a game against Südtirol. He started the game and played a complete match.

On 1 September 2020, he joined Carrarese on loan.

On 21 July 2021, he left Udinese and signed for Serie C club Renate.

== International career ==
He was first called up to represent his country in 2015 for the Under-15 squad. He subsequently appeared for the national teams in the next 3 age brackets, all in friendlies.
