= Potenza Calcio =

Italian football club

Potenza
- Full name: Potenza Calcio S.r.l.
- Nicknames: Rossoblù (Red-Blues); Leoni (Lions)
- Founded: 1920 (Potenza S.C.); 1986 as Potenza Calcio; 1994 as UC Potenza; 2012 (merger)
- Ground: Stadio Alfredo Viviani, Potenza, Italy
- Capacity: 5,500
- Chairman: Donato Macchia
- Manager: Ivan Tisci
- League: Serie C Group C
- 2025–26: Serie C Group C, 10th of 20
- Website: www.potenzacalcio.eu
| Home colours | Away colours | Third colours |

Potenza Calcio S.r.l., formerly A.S.D. Rossoblù Potenza F.C. or just Potenza F.C., is an Italian football club based in Potenza, Basilicata. It currently plays in the Serie C.

Potenza Calcio was founded in June 2012 as F.C.D. Rossoblu Potenza, by a merger of two amateur teams Controsenso Potenza and Atella Monticchio. The club had claimed as a phoenix club of Potenza S.C., which was first founded in 2004, adopting an explicit logo after reaching the professional status in 2018. Potenza S.C.was de-registered from Italian Football Federation in April 2012 after played their last season in 2010–11 Eccellenza Basilicata. From 2011–12 to 2012–13 season, another team, Città di Potenza (formerly: Atletico Potenza, P3F Potenza Giocoleria, Lucania Team Giocoleria) was briefly acted as the major successor of Potenza S.C.

== Predecessors ==
In the 21st century there have been numerous changes in the football teams in the city of Potenza.

=== F.C. Potenza / Potenza S.C. ===
Potenza S.C. was the historical team of the city which under many merger and reformation. The club was expelled from 2009–10 Lega Pro Prima Divisione in the mid-season. The club was re-admitted to 2010–11 Eccellenza Basilicata. In April 2012 the membership of the club in Italian Football Federation was officially cancelled.

After the 2010 exclusion, Città di Potenza and F.C.D. Rossoblu Potenza became the successors of the club.

=== Lucania / Città di Potenza ===
In 2000 A.C. Lucania Team was founded, starting in the Terza Categoria in the 2000–01 season. The team was then known as A.D. A.C. Lucania Team Giocoleria and then A.S.D. A.C. Parco Tre Fontane Giocoleria, A.S.D. P3F Potenza Giocoleria.

In 2009, the team changed its name again to A.S.D. Atletico Potenza, then won the 2011–12 Eccellenza Basilicata leading to promotion into 2012–13 Serie D.

In 2012 its name changed again to Città di Potenza S.S. a r.l.d.. However, in summer 2013 the club was relegated, but wasn't able to enter 2013–14 Eccellenza; it was therefore liquidated. The club was also fined €2,500 for an incident during 2012–13 season.

The team played at the Stadio Alfredo Viviani, in Potenza, Italy with a capacity of 5,500 places. Its team colors were red and blue.

Honours

- Eccellenza Basilicata:
  - Winner (1): 2011–12 (as Atletico Potenza)
- Prima Categoria Basilicata:
  - Winner (1): 2009–10 (as Atletico Potenza)
- Regional Coppa Italia Basilicata:
  - Winner (1): 2011–12 (as Atletico Potenza)

Timeline of Città di Potenza
- 2000–01 - Founded as A.C. Lucania Team.
- 2001–2006 - ?
- 2006–07 - 10th in Prima Categoria Basilicata Group B
- 2007–08 - 14th in Prima Categoria Basilicata Group B; Name changed to P3F Potenza Giocoleria
- 2008–09 - 3rd in Prima Categoria Basilicata Group A;
- 2009–10 - 1st in Prima Categoria Basilicata Group A (▲ promoted); Name changed to Atletico Potenza
- 2010–11 - 2nd in Promozione Basilicata (▲ promoted)
- 2011–12 - 1st in Eccellenza Basilicata (▲ promoted)
- 2012–13 - 18th in Serie D/H (▼ relegated); Name changed to Città di Potenza

== History ==
=== Atella Monticchio ===
A.S.D. Atella Monticchio Vulture, formerly known as Polisportiva Atella Monticchio was a team from Atella, a town in the Province of Potenza. The team itself was a merger of Polisportiva Monticchio, based in Rionero in Vulture, and Polisportiva Atella, based in Atella. The new team participated in 2001–02 Promozione Basilicata. The team entered the promotion playoffs of 2006–07 and 2007–08 Eccellenza Basilicata, Italian 6th highest level at that time. The team finished as the losing semi-finalists and losing finalists respectively. The team also entered the first round of the promotion playoffs of 2010–11 Eccellenza, against Adrano of Sicily region.

In June 2012 the club merged with Controsenso Potenza from Promozione Basilicata, Italian 7th highest level at that time. Controsenso Potenza finished as the 11th in 2011–12 Promozione Basilicata, while Atella Monticchio finished as the 6th in 2011–12 Eccellenza Basilicata. Since Atella Monticchio had a higher league position than Controsenso Potenza, the new team F.C.D. Rossoblù Potenza inherited the position of Atella Monticchio in 2012–13 Eccellenza Basilicata, but relocated to Potenza as one of the illegitimate successor of Potenza S.C. Another illegitimate successor, Città di Potenza, competed in 2012–13 Serie D.

=== Controsenso Potenza ===
U.S.D. Controsenso Potenza was a football team founded in 2010 by the merger of "A.S.D. Futura Potenza" and "A.S.D. Real Zara", both from Potenza. They participated in Prima Categoria Basilicata and Terza Categoria Potenza Province respectively in 2009–10 season. That season, as well as 2008–09 season, there were local derbies between the two future successors of Potenza S.C., as Futura Potenza and Atletico Potenza (ex-P3F Potenza) were in the same group: Group A.

The new team at first participated in 2010–11 Prima Categoria Basilicata and won the league in the first season.

Futura Potenza was formerly known as U.S. Potenza Mondo di Biagione and A.S. Geotek Mondo di Biagione. Futura Potenza had also participated in 2002–03 and 2007–08 Promozione Basilicata, and lower division(s) between the two seasons. In June 2008 it was relegated to aforementioned 2008–09 Prima Categoria Basilicata.

Real Zara was founded in mid-2008. They participated in Terza Categoria in their 2 years of history.

=== Rossoblù Potenza / Potenza Calcio ===
F.C.D. Rossoblù Potenza was founded in June 2012 after the merger of "A.S.D. Atella Monticchio Vulture", based in Atella and "U.S.D. Controsenso Potenza", based in Potenza.

In June 2014 it was promoted from Eccellenza Basilicata to 2014–15 Serie D.

In summer 2014 the club was renamed A.S.D. Rossoblù Potenza F.C..

In summer 2015 the club was again renamed to Potenza Calcio S.S.D. a r.l..

The club won the group stage of 2017–18 Serie D and promoted to Serie C.

== Colors and badge ==
The team's colors are red and blue.

== Current squad ==
As of 1 September 2026

Note: Flags indicate national team as defined under FIFA eligibility rules; some limited exceptions apply. Players may hold more than one non-FIFA nationality.

| No. | Pos. | Nation | Player |
|---|---|---|---|
| 2 | DF | ITA | Nicolò Verza |
| 3 | DF | ITA | Luca Russo |
| 4 | MF | ITA | Lorenzo Ferro |
| 6 | DF | ITA | Giuseppe Loiacono |
| 7 | FW | ITA | Nicolò Bruschi |
| 8 | MF | ITA | Manuele Castorani |
| 9 | FW | ITA | Jacopo Murano |
| 10 | MF | ITA | Gianluca D'Auria |
| 11 | FW | ITA | Luca Mazzeo |
| 14 | MF | ITA | Andrea Franzolini |
| 17 | GK | ITA | Tommaso Cucchietti |
| 21 | MF | ITA | Matteo Manfredonia |
| 22 | GK | ITA | Denis Franchi |

| No. | Pos. | Nation | Player |
|---|---|---|---|
| 23 | MF | ITA | Antonino De Marco |
| 24 | MF | ITA | Augusto Bando (on loan from Ascoli) |
| 25 | DF | MDA | Cornelius Staver |
| 26 | DF | NZL | Niko Kirwan |
| 30 | FW | ITA | Luca Petrungaro |
| 32 | MF | ITA | Vincenzo Galletta |
| 35 | DF | ITA | Davide Giannini (on loan from Pescara) |
| 47 | DF | ITA | Raul Alessandro Bura |
| 70 | FW | ITA | Gabriele Selleri |
| 77 | MF | ITA | Matteo Ghisolfi |
| 80 | FW | BRA | Matheus dos Santos (on loan from Juve Stabia) |
| 98 | DF | ITA | Claud Adjapong |

=== Out on loan ===
Note: Flags indicate national team as defined under FIFA eligibility rules; some limited exceptions apply. Players may hold more than one non-FIFA nationality.

| No. / Pos. / Nation / Player; — / Giovanni Guiotto / ITA / GK (at Luparense until 30 June 2027) | No. / Pos. / Nation / Player; — / Lucas Felippe / BRA / MF (at Virtus Entella until 30 June 2027) |

== Managers ==
- Pino Camelia (2014?)
- Nicola Ragno (2017–2018)
- Giuseppe Raffaele (2018–2020)

== Honours ==
Controsenso Potenza

- Prima Categoria Basilicata: 2010–11

Potenza Calcio

- Serie D Group H 2017–18 (as S.S.D. Potenza Calcio)
- Eccellenza Basilicata: 2013–14 (as Rossoblù Potenza)
- Coppa Italia Serie C 2025–26
