= Aristidi Kolaj =

Albanian footballer (born 1999)

Personal information
- Date of birth: 9 April 1999 (age 27)
- Place of birth: Marino, Italy
- Height: 1.81 m (5 ft 11 in)
- Positions: Forward; winger

Team information
- Current team: Teuta
- Number: 20

Youth career
- –2017: Como
- 2017–2019: Sassuolo

Senior career*
Years	Team	Apps	(Gls)
2017–2021	Sassuolo	0	(0)
2019–2021	→ Pro Patria (loan)	54	(8)
2021–2022	Alessandria	20	(1)
2022–2024	Pescara	32	(2)
2023–2024	→ Lumezzane (loan)	8	(0)
2024	→ Sorrento (loan)	10	(0)
2024–2025	Crotone	5	(0)
2025	→ Renate (loan)	8	(1)
2025–2026	Renate	16	(2)
2026–	Teuta	2	(0)

International career
2018–2020	Albania U21	8	(0)
- * Club domestic league appearances and goals as of 13 May 2026

Aristidi Kolaj (born 9 April 1999) is a professional footballer who plays for Teuta. Born in Italy, he has represented Albania at youth level.

== Club career ==
=== Como ===
He spent most of his youth career at Lega Pro club Como. He was called up to the senior squad in early 2017, but didn't make any appearances.

=== Sassuolo ===
In July 2017 he was transferred to Serie A club Sassuolo, where he played for their Under-19 squad in the 2017–18 and 2018–19 seasons. He was called up to the senior squad once for a Coppa Italia game, but remained on the bench.

==== Loan to Pro Patria ====
On 2 September 2019 he joined Serie C club Pro Patria on loan.

He made his professional Serie C debut for Pro Patria on 22 September 2019 in a game against Siena. He substituted Giuseppe Le Noci in the 89th minute and scored the only goal of the game in added time.

The loan was renewed for the 2020–21 season on 26 August 2020.

=== Alessandria ===
On 15 July 2021, he signed with Alessandria.

=== Pescara ===
On 12 August 2022, he joined Pescara.

On 1 September 2023, Kolaj moved to Lumezzane on loan with an option to buy. On 17 January 2024, he was loaned to Sorrento.

=== Crotone ===
On 13 August 2024, Kolaj moved to Crotone on a three-year contract.
