= List of Italian football transfers summer 2017 =

This is a list of Italian football transfers featuring at least one Serie A or Serie B club which were completed from 1 July to 31 August 2017, the date which the summer transfer window closed. Free agents could join any club at any time.

== Transfers ==
Legend

- Those clubs in Italic indicate that the player already left the team on loan on this or the previous season or new signing that immediately left the club

=== February–May ===
| Date | Name | Moving from | Moving to | Fee |
|---|---|---|---|---|
| 1 February 2017 | (Serbia) Vanja Milinković-Savić | (Poland) Lechia Gdańsk | Torino | Undisclosed |
| 2 February 2017 | (Sweden) Pontus Jansson | Torino | (England) Leeds United | Undisclosed (Note: The player already played for his new club in 2016–17 season, the deal turned from temporary to definitive.) |
| 4 February 2017 | (Czech Republic) Antonín Barák | (Czech Republic) Slavia Prague | Udinese | Undisclosed |
| 29 March 2017 | (Brazil) Lyanco | (Brazil) São Paulo | Torino | Undisclosed |
| 10 April 2017 | (Italy) Simone Zaza | Juventus | (Spain) Valencia | €16M |
| 21 April 2017 | (Uruguay) Rodrigo Bentancur | (Argentina) Boca Juniors | Juventus | €9,5M |
| 27 April 2017 | (France) Kingsley Coman | Juventus | (Germany) Bayern Munich | €21M |
| 2 May 2017 | (Denmark) Andreas Cornelius | (Denmark) Copenhagen | Atalanta | Undisclosed |
| 9 May 2017 | (Switzerland) Blerim Džemaili | Bologna | (Canada) Montreal Impact | 6-month loan |
| 12 May 2017 | (Morocco) Medhi Benatia | (Germany) Bayern Munich | Juventus | €17M |
| 22 May 2017 | (Colombia) Juan Cuadrado | (England) Chelsea | Juventus | €20M |
| 23 May 2017 | (Spain) Diego López | Milan | (Spain) Espanyol | Undisclosed |
| 30 May 2017 | (Argentina) Mateo Musacchio | (Spain) Villarreal | Milan | Undisclosed |
| 31 May 2017 | (Portugal) Bruno Alves | Cagliari | (Scotland) Rangers | Free |

=== June ===
| Date | Name | Moving from | Moving to | Fee |
|---|---|---|---|---|
| 2 June 2017 | (Germany) Robin Gosens | (Netherlands) Heracles | Atalanta | Undisclosed |
| 2 June 2017 | (Mali) Aly Mallé | (Spain) Granada | Udinese | Undisclosed |
| 2 June 2017 | (Ivory Coast) Franck Kessié | Atalanta | Milan | 2-year loan (Note: This is a deal with an obligation to automatically buy the player at the end of the loan) |
| 5 June 2017 | (Brazil) Vitor Hugo | (Brazil) Palmeiras | Fiorentina | Undisclosed |
| 6 June 2017 | (Denmark) Simon Makienok | Palermo | (Netherlands) Utrecht | Undisclosed |
| 7 June 2017 | (Turkey) Caner Erkin | Inter | (Turkey) Beşiktaş | €750K |
| 8 June 2017 | (Switzerland) Nicolas Haas | (Switzerland) Luzern | Atalanta | Free |
| 8 June 2017 | (Switzerland) Ricardo Rodríguez | (Germany) VfL Wolfsburg | Milan | Undisclosed |
| 9 June 2017 | Simone Rizzato | Trapani | Avellino | Free |
| 10 June 2017 | Simone Colombi | Cagliari | Carpi | Undisclosed |
| 10 June 2017 | Marco Ezio Fossati | Cagliari | Verona | Undisclosed |
| 12 June 2017 | (Portugal) André Silva | (Portugal) Porto | Milan | Undisclosed |
| 12 June 2017 | Nicolò Cherubin | Bologna | Verona | Undisclosed |
| 12 June 2017 | (Sweden) Filip Helander | Verona | Bologna | Undisclosed |
| 13 June 2017 | (Mexico) Héctor Moreno | (Netherlands) PSV | Roma | Undisclosed |
| 13 June 2017 | (Bulgaria) Antonio Vutov | Udinese | (Bulgaria) Levski Sofia | Loan |
| 14 June 2017 | (Croatia) Tomislav Gomelt | Bari | (Croatia) HNK Rijeka | Undisclosed |
| 15 June 2017 | (Brazil) Bruno Henrique | Palermo | (Brazil) Palmeiras | Undisclosed |
| 15 June 2017 | (Brazil) Guilherme | Udinese | (Spain) Deportivo de La Coruña | Undisclosed |
| 16 June 2017 | (Serbia) Nikola Milenković | (Serbia) Partizan | Fiorentina | Undisclosed |
| 19 June 2017 | Mirko Albertazzi | Bologna | Virtus Francavilla | Loan |
| 19 June 2017 | Gianluca Di Chiara | Catanzaro | Perugia | Undisclosed |
| 19 June 2017 | Andrea Favilli | Livorno | Ascoli | €3M |
| 19 June 2017 | Antonino Barillà | Trapani | Parma | Free |
| 19 June 2017 | Marco Frediani | Roma | Parma | Undisclosed |
| 19 June 2017 | Francesco Galuppini | Ciliverghe Mazzano | Parma | Free |
| 19 June 2017 | (Portugal) Bruno Gaspar | (Portugal) Vitória de Guimarães | Fiorentina | Undisclosed |
| 19 June 2017 | (Croatia) Damjan Đoković | Spezia | (Croatia) HNK Rijeka | Undisclosed |
| 19 June 2017 | Andrea Isufaj | Arezzo | Chievo | Undisclosed |
| 20 June 2017 | (Switzerland) Philippe Koch | Novara | (Switzerland) St. Gallen | Undisclosed |
| 20 June 2017 | Luca Iotti | Ascoli | Olbia | Undisclosed |
| 21 June 2017 | (Ghana) Bright Gyamfi | Inter | Benevento | Undisclosed |
| 21 June 2017 | Luciano Arciello | Altovicentino | Avellino | Undisclosed |
| 21 June 2017 | Lorenzo Laverone | Salernitana | Avellino | Undisclosed |
| 21 June 2017 | (Ghana) Raman Chibsah | Sassuolo | Benevento | Undisclosed |
| 21 June 2017 | Andrea Arrighini | Avellino | Cittadella | Undisclosed |
| 21 June 2017 | Simone Pecorini | Virtus Entella | Avellino | Undisclosed |
| 21 June 2017 | Matthias Solerio | Giana Erminio | Avellino | Undisclosed |
| 21 June 2017 | (Albania) Etrit Berisha | Lazio | Atalanta | Undisclosed |
| 21 June 2017 | (Ivory Coast) Christian Kouamé | Prato | Cittadella | Undisclosed |
| 21 June 2017 | Mattia Sprocati | Pro Vercelli | Salernitana | Undisclosed |
| 21 June 2017 | Dimitri Bisoli | Fidelis Andria | Brescia | Undisclosed |
| 21 June 2017 | Salvatore Caturano | Bari | Lecce | Undisclosed |
| 22 June 2017 | (Costa Rica) Giancarlo González | Palermo | Bologna | Undisclosed |
| 22 June 2017 | Elio Calderini | Fondi | Foggia | Undisclosed |
| 22 June 2017 | Francesco Deli | Paganese | Foggia | Undisclosed |
| 22 June 2017 | Enrico Pezzi | Benevento | Cittadella | Free |
| 22 June 2017 | (Guinea) Alhassane Soumah | Juventus | (Switzerland) Chiasso | Loan |
| 22 June 2017 | (Albania) Erion Beqiri | Lazio | (Switzerland) Chiasso | Loan |
| 23 June 2017 | Enrico Guarna | Bari | Foggia | Undisclosed |
| 23 June 2017 | Fabrizio Brignani | Cremonese | Bologna | Undisclosed |
| 23 June 2017 | Alessandro Celli | Lupa Roma | Foggia | Undisclosed |
| 23 June 2017 | Thomas Fantoni | Bassano | Bologna | Undisclosed |
| 24 June 2017 | Filippo Frison | Bassano | Fiorentina | Undisclosed |
| 24 June 2017 | (Argentina) Albano Bizzarri | Pescara | Udinese | Free |
| 25 June 2017 | Gianmarco De Feo | Siena | Ascoli | Undisclosed |
| 25 June 2017 | Claudio Santini | Pontedera | Ascoli | Undisclosed |
| 26 June 2017 | Simone Paolini | Ascoli | Pontedera | Loan |
| 26 June 2017 | (Switzerland) David Da Costa | Novara | (Switzerland) Lugano | Undisclosed |
| 26 June 2017 | Marco Chiosa | Torino | Novara | Undisclosed |
| 27 June 2017 | Francesco Di Tacchio | Pisa | Avellino | Undisclosed |
| 27 June 2017 | Salvatore Sirigu | (France) Paris Saint-Germain | Torino | Undisclosed |
| 27 June 2017 | Sebastian De Maio | (Belgium) Anderlecht | Bologna | Undisclosed |
| 27 June 2017 | (Portugal) Bruno Fernandes | Sampdoria | (Portugal) Sporting CP | €8,5M |
| 27 June 2017 | (Argentina) Éver Banega | Inter | (Spain) Sevilla | Undisclosed |
| 28 June 2017 | (Brazil) Lucas Evangelista | Udinese | (Portugal) Estoril | Loan |
| 28 June 2017 | Agostino Camigliano | Udinese | Cittadella | Loan |
| 28 June 2017 | (Netherlands) Rick Karsdorp | (Netherlands) Feyenoord | Roma | €14+5M |
| 28 June 2017 | (Belgium) Pierre-Yves Ngawa | (Belgium) OH Leuven | Avellino | Undisclosed |
| 28 June 2017 | Luigi Carillo | Pescara | Pisa | Loan |
| 28 June 2017 | Andrea Signorini | Fondi | Ternana | Undisclosed |
| 28 June 2017 | Daniele Marino | Fondi | Ternana | Undisclosed |
| 28 June 2017 | Luca Giannone | Fondi | Ternana | Undisclosed |
| 28 June 2017 | Filippo Tiscione | Fondi | Ternana | Undisclosed |
| 28 June 2017 | Stefano Beltrame | Juventus | (Netherlands) Go Ahead Eagles | Loan |
| 29 June 2017 | Nicola Falasco | Roma | Avellino | Loan |
| 29 June 2017 | Michele Rigione | Cesena | Chievo | Undisclosed |
| 29 June 2017 | (Poland) Tomasz Kupisz | Chievo | Cesena | Undisclosed |
| 29 June 2017 | (The Gambia) Lamin Jallow | Chievo | Cesena | Loan |
| 29 June 2017 | (Spain) Alejandro Rodríguez | Cesena | Chievo | Undisclosed |
| 29 June 2017 | Luca Garritano | Cesena | Chievo | Undisclosed |
| 29 June 2017 | (Morocco) Younes Bnou Marzouk | Juventus | (Switzerland) Lugano | Undisclosed |
| 29 June 2017 | (Argentina) José Luis Palomino | (Bulgaria) Ludogorets | Atalanta | Undisclosed |
| 30 June 2017 | Christian Capone | Atalanta | Pescara | Loan |
| 30 June 2017 | (Ivory Coast) Emmanuel Latte Lath | Atalanta | Pescara | Loan |
| 30 June 2017 | Lorenzo Pellegrini | Sassuolo | Roma | €10M |
| 30 June 2017 | Federico Ricci | Roma | Sassuolo | Undisclosed |
| 30 June 2017 | (Greece) Panagiotis Tachtsidis | Torino | (Greece) Olympiacos | Undisclosed |
| 30 June 2017 | (Brazil) Caio Rangel | Cagliari | (Portugal) Estoril | Undisclosed |
| 30 June 2017 | (Belgium) Senna Miangue | Inter | Cagliari | Undisclosed |
| 30 June 2017 | Marco Bleve | Lecce | Ternana | Undisclosed |
| 30 June 2017 | Gianluca Caprari | Inter | Sampdoria | Undisclosed |
| 30 June 2017 | Federico Dimarco | Inter | (Switzerland) Sion | Undisclosed |
| 30 June 2017 | Giuseppe Pezzella | Palermo | Udinese | Undisclosed |
| 30 June 2017 | Fabio Eguelfi | Inter | Atalanta | Undisclosed |
| 30 June 2017 | (Germany) Gianluca Gaudino | (Germany) Bayern Munich | Chievo | Undisclosed |
| 30 June 2017 | Leonardo Mancuso | Sambenedettese | Pescara | Undisclosed |
| 30 June 2017 | Luca Cigarini | Sampdoria | Cagliari | Undisclosed |
| 30 June 2017 | Nicola Murru | Cagliari | Sampdoria | Undisclosed |
| 30 June 2017 | Mattia Proietti | Bassano | Pescara | Undisclosed |
| 30 June 2017 | (Ivory Coast) Seydou Doumbia | Roma | (Portugal) Sporting CP | Loan |
| 30 June 2017 | (Guadeloupe) Andreaw Gravillon | Inter | Benevento | Undisclosed |
| 30 June 2017 | Edoardo Soleri | Roma | Spezia | Loan |
| 30 June 2017 | Fabio Borini | (England) Sunderland | Milan | Loan |

=== July ===
| Date | Name | Moving from | Moving to | Fee |
|---|---|---|---|---|
| 1 July 2017 | (Sweden) Svante Ingelsson | (Sweden) Kalmar | Udinese | Undisclosed |
| 1 July 2017 | (Greece) Anastasios Donis | Juventus | (Germany) VfB Stuttgart | Undisclosed |
| 1 July 2017 | Marco Calderoni | Chievo | Novara | Undisclosed |
| 1 July 2017 | (Argentina) Leandro Paredes | Roma | (Russia) Zenit | €23+4M |
| 1 July 2017 | (Montenegro) Christian Hadžiosmanović | Milan | Sampdoria | Free |
| 1 July 2017 | (Croatia) Ivan Vujčić | Hajduk | Sampdoria | Free |
| 1 July 2017 | Massimo Coda | Salernitana | Benevento | Undisclosed |
| 1 July 2017 | Luca Vido | Milan | Atalanta | Undisclosed |
| 1 July 2017 | (Montenegro) Adam Marušić | (Belgium) Oostende | Lazio | Undisclosed |
| 1 July 2017 | (Georgia (country)) Irakli Shekiladze | Tuttocuoio | Spezia | Free |
| 1 July 2017 | Andrea Poli | Milan | Bologna | Undisclosed |
| 3 July 2017 | Daniele Padelli | Torino | Inter | Free |
| 3 July 2017 | (Greece) Marios Oikonomou | Bologna | S.P.A.L. | Loan |
| 3 July 2017 | Christian D'Urso | Roma | Ascoli | Loan |
| 3 July 2017 | Andrea Settembrini | FeralpiSalò | Cittadella | Free |
| 3 July 2017 | (France) Maxime Gonalons | (France) Lyon | Roma | €5M |
| 3 July 2017 | Felipe dal Belo | Udinese | S.P.A.L. | Undisclosed |
| 3 July 2017 | Federico Mattiello | Juventus | S.P.A.L. | Loan |
| 3 July 2017 | Luca Rizzo | Bologna | S.P.A.L. | Loan |
| 3 July 2017 | Alessio Vita | Sassuolo | Cesena | Undisclosed |
| 3 July 2017 | (Turkey) Hakan Çalhanoğlu | (Germany) Bayer Leverkusen | Milan | Undisclosed |
| 3 July 2017 | Ernesto Torregrossa | Verona | Brescia | Loan |
| 3 July 2017 | Luca Checchin | Verona | Brescia | Loan |
| 3 July 2017 | Filippo Perucchini | Bologna | Lecce | Loan |
| 3 July 2017 | (Algeria) Adam Ounas | (France) Bordeaux | Napoli | Undisclosed |
| 4 July 2017 | (Democratic Republic of the Congo) Paul-José M'Poku | Chievo | (Belgium) Standard Liège | Undisclosed |
| 4 July 2017 | (Germany) Oliver Kragl | Frosinone | Crotone | Undisclosed |
| 4 July 2017 | (Uruguay) Ignacio Lores Varela | Pisa | Ascoli | Undisclosed |
| 4 July 2017 | Marco Carraro | Inter | Pescara | Loan |
| 4 July 2017 | Andrea Palazzi | Inter | Pescara | Loan |
| 4 July 2017 | (Netherlands) Kevin Diks | Fiorentina | (Netherlands) Feyenoord | Loan |
| 4 July 2017 | (Slovakia) Jakub Hromada | Sampdoria | (Czech Republic) Slavia Prague | Undisclosed |
| 4 July 2017 | Wladimiro Falcone | Sampdoria | Bassano | Loan |
| 4 July 2017 | (Serbia) Uroš Ćosić | Empoli | (Greece) AEK Athens | Undisclosed |
| 4 July 2017 | Alessandro Plizzari | Milan | Ternana | Loan |
| 4 July 2017 | (Netherlands) Alessio Da Cruz | (Netherlands) Twente | Novara | Undisclosed |
| 5 July 2017 | (Slovenia) Josip Iličić | Fiorentina | Atalanta | Undisclosed |
| 5 July 2017 | (Croatia) Ante Budimir | Sampdoria | Crotone | Loan |
| 5 July 2017 | Nicolò Zaniolo | Virtus Entella | Inter | Undisclosed |
| 5 July 2017 | (Denmark) Jens Odgaard | (Denmark) Lyngby Boldklub | Inter | Undisclosed |
| 5 July 2017 | Michele Cavion | Juventus | Cremonese | Free |
| 5 July 2017 | Pierluigi Cappelluzzo | Verona | Pescara | Loan |
| 5 July 2017 | Andrea Beghetto | Genoa | Frosinone | Loan |
| 5 July 2017 | Matteo Bruscagin | Latina | Venezia | Free |
| 5 July 2017 | Marco Pinato | Latina | Venezia | Free |
| 6 July 2017 | Mario Pugliese | Atalanta | Pro Vercelli | Loan |
| 6 July 2017 | Dario Bergamelli | Catania | Pro Vercelli | Undisclosed |
| 6 July 2017 | Tommaso Nobile | Lucchese | Pro Vercelli | Undisclosed |
| 6 July 2017 | Lorenzo Grossi | Roma | Pro Vercelli | Undisclosed |
| 6 July 2017 | Alessandro Bordin | Roma | Ternana | Loan |
| 6 July 2017 | Andrea Ingegneri | Pordenone | Palermo | Undisclosed |
| 6 July 2017 | Francesco Giorno | Casertana | Parma | Free |
| 6 July 2017 | Francesco Bombagi | Fondi | Ternana | Undisclosed |
| 6 July 2017 | Giuseppe Gambino | Fondi | Ternana | Undisclosed |
| 6 July 2017 | Stefano D'Agostino | Fondi | Ternana | Undisclosed |
| 7 July 2017 | (Slovakia) Milan Škriniar | Sampdoria | Inter | Undisclosed |
| 7 July 2017 | Massimiliano Busellato | Salernitana | Bari | Undisclosed |
| 7 July 2017 | Matteo Pessina | Milan | Atalanta | Undisclosed |
| 7 July 2017 | Andrea Conti | Atalanta | Milan | Undisclosed |
| 7 July 2017 | Emanuele Rovini | Udinese | Pro Vercelli | Loan |
| 7 July 2017 | (Slovenia) Jan Mlakar | Fiorentina | Venezia | Loan |
| 7 July 2017 | (Belgium) Timothy Castagne | (Belgium) Genk | Atalanta | Undisclosed |
| 7 July 2017 | Alberto Paloschi | Atalanta | S.P.A.L. | Loan |
| 7 July 2017 | Arturo Calabresi | Roma | Spezia | Loan |
| 7 July 2017 | (Poland) Igor Łasicki | Napoli | (Poland) Wisła Płock | Loan |
| 7 July 2017 | (Romania) George Pușcaș | Inter | Benevento | Loan |
| 7 July 2017 | Lorenzo Venuti | Fiorentina | Benevento | Loan |
| 7 July 2017 | Federico Viviani | Verona | S.P.A.L. | Loan |
| 7 July 2017 | (Bulgaria) Andrey Galabinov | Novara | Genoa | Free |
| 7 July 2017 | (Argentina) Lucas Orbán | Genoa | (Argentina) Racing Club | Free |
| 7 July 2017 | Stefano Antezza | Spezia | Renate | Loan |
| 7 July 2017 | Gaetano Letizia | Carpi | Benevento | Undisclosed |
| 7 July 2017 | (Slovenia) Vid Belec | Carpi | Benevento | Undisclosed |
| 7 July 2017 | Nicola Borghetto | Belluno | Verona | Loan |
| 7 July 2017 | (Croatia) Karlo Lulić | Sampdoria | (Croatia) NK Rudeš | Undisclosed |
| 7 July 2017 | (Serbia) David Milinković | Genoa | Foggia | Loan |
| 7 July 2017 | Davide Agazzi | Atalanta | Foggia | Loan |
| 7 July 2017 | Daniele Verde | Roma | Verona | Loan |
| 7 July 2017 | (Brazil) Neto | Juventus | (Spain) Valencia | €6+1M |
| 7 July 2017 | (Senegal) Mouhamadou Sarr | Bologna | Prato | Loan |
| 7 July 2017 | Marco Andreolli | Inter | Cagliari | Free |
| 7 July 2017 | (Honduras) Rigoberto Rivas | Prato | Inter | Undisclosed |
| 7 July 2017 | (Slovakia) Juraj Kucka | Milan | (Turkey) Trabzonspor | Undisclosed |
| 7 July 2017 | Andrea Paolucci | Cittadella | Ternana | Free |
| 7 July 2017 | (Romania) Ionuț Pop | Roma | Alessandria | Undisclosed |
| 7 July 2017 | (Uruguay) Juan Manuel Ramos | Casertana | Parma | Free |
| 8 July 2017 | Emil Audero | Juventus | Venezia | Loan |
| 8 July 2017 | Luca Zanon | Fiorentina | Ternana | Loan |
| 8 July 2017 | (Brazil) João Schmidt | (Brazil) São Paulo | Atalanta | Free |
| 8 July 2017 | Stefano Gori | Bari | Pro Piacenza | Loan |
| 8 July 2017 | Alfred Gomis | Torino | S.P.A.L. | Loan |
| 8 July 2017 | (Australia) Panos Armenakas | Udinese | (Belgium) Tubize | Loan |
| 8 July 2017 | Michele Nardi | Santarcangelo | Parma | Free |
| 8 July 2017 | (Equatorial Guinea) José Machín | Roma | Brescia | Loan |
| 8 July 2017 | Simone Franchini | Sassuolo | Ternana | Loan |
| 9 July 2017 | Davide Faraoni | Udinese | Crotone | Loan |
| 9 July 2017 | (Germany) Antonio Rüdiger | Roma | (England) Chelsea | €35M |
| 9 July 2017 | (Argentina) Nicolás Spolli | Chievo | Genoa | Free |
| 9 July 2017 | Filippo Bandinelli | Latina | Sassuolo | Free |
| 10 July 2017 | (Senegal) Mamadou Coulibaly | Pescara | Udinese | Undisclosed |
| 10 July 2017 | (Senegal) Mamadou Coulibaly | Udinese | Pescara | Undisclosed |
| 10 July 2017 | Marco Firenze | Crotone | Pro Vercelli | Loan |
| 10 July 2017 | Luca Lezzerini | Fiorentina | Avellino | Undisclosed |
| 10 July 2017 | Matthias Solerio | Avellino | Reggina | Loan |
| 10 July 2017 | (Brazil) Carlão | Torino | (Cyprus) APOEL | Loan |
| 10 July 2017 | (France) Maxime Giron | Avellino | Bisceglie | Undisclosed |
| 10 July 2017 | Antonio Cassano | Unattached | Verona | Free |
| 10 July 2017 | Alessio Cerci | (Spain) Atlético Madrid | Verona | Free |
| 10 July 2017 | Davide Bassi | Unattached | Spezia | Free |
| 10 July 2017 | (Argentina) Ezequiel Ponce | Roma | (France) Lille OSC | Loan |
| 10 July 2017 | Camillo Ciano | Cesena | Frosinone | Undisclosed |
| 10 July 2017 | Alessandro Favalli | Padova | Ternana | Free |
| 10 July 2017 | Alessandro Di Paolantonio | Teramo | Ternana | Undisclosed |
| 11 July 2017 | (Spain) Borja Valero | Fiorentina | Inter | Undisclosed |
| 11 July 2017 | Gaetano Castrovilli | Fiorentina | Cremonese | Loan |
| 11 July 2017 | Gabriele Rolando | Sampdoria | Palermo | Loan |
| 11 July 2017 | (Colombia) Luis Muriel | Sampdoria | (Spain) Sevilla | Undisclosed |
| 11 July 2017 | (France) Axel Mohamed Bakayoko | Inter | (France) Sochaux | Loan |
| 11 July 2017 | Elio Capradossi | Roma | Bari | Loan |
| 11 July 2017 | Alberto Masi | Ternana | Bari | Free |
| 11 July 2017 | Victor De Lucia | Catanzaro | Bari | Free |
| 11 July 2017 | Riccardo Improta | Genoa | Bari | Loan |
| 11 July 2017 | Filippo Berardi | Torino | Juve Stabia | Loan |
| 11 July 2017 | Mattia Bonetto | Inter | Prato | Loan |
| 11 July 2017 | Matteo Procopio | Torino | Cremonese | Loan |
| 11 July 2017 | (Poland) Dawid Kownacki | (Poland) Lech Poznań | Sampdoria | Undisclosed |
| 11 July 2017 | (Argentina) Bruno Zuculini | (England) Manchester City | Verona | Undisclosed |
| 11 July 2017 | (Brazil) Ronaldo Pompeu | Lazio | Novara | Undisclosed |
| 11 July 2017 | Raffaele Maiello | Napoli | Frosinone | Undisclosed |
| 11 July 2017 | Nicholas Giani | S.P.A.L. | Spezia | Free |
| 11 July 2017 | Ivan Provedel | Chievo | Empoli | Undisclosed |
| 11 July 2017 | Manuel Pucciarelli | Empoli | Chievo | 2-year loan |
| 11 July 2017 | (Brazil) Igor Coronado | Trapani | Palermo | Undisclosed |
| 11 July 2017 | Pietro Terracciano | Catania | Empoli | Undisclosed |
| 11 July 2017 | (Dominican Republic) Antonio Santurro | Siracusa | Bologna | Free |
| 11 July 2017 | Davide Facchin | Venezia | Reggiana | Loan |
| 11 July 2017 | Alfredo Donnarumma | Salernitana | Empoli | Undisclosed |
| 11 July 2017 | Raffaele Pucino | Chievo | Salernitana | Loan |
| 11 July 2017 | Samuele Massolo | Sanremese | Virtus Entella | Undisclosed |
| 11 July 2017 | Michele Currarino | Lavagnese | Virtus Entella | Undisclosed |
| 11 July 2017 | (Portugal) Mário Rui | Roma | Napoli | Loan |
| 11 July 2017 | Luca Cattaneo | Pordenone | Brescia | Undisclosed |
| 11 July 2017 | Nicolò Casale | Verona | Perugia | Loan |
| 11 July 2017 | Matteo Di Piazza | Foggia | Lecce | Loan |
| 11 July 2017 | (Spain) Jon Errasti | Spezia | (Spain) Alcorcón | Free |
| 11 July 2017 | Matteo Grandi | Cesena | Bassano | Loan |
| 12 July 2017 | Roberto Ogunseye | Inter | Olbia | Undisclosed |
| 12 July 2017 | Francesco Forte | Inter | Spezia | Loan |
| 12 July 2017 | Raffaele Di Gennaro | Inter | Spezia | Loan |
| 12 July 2017 | Alberto Almici | Atalanta | Cremonese | Loan |
| 12 July 2017 | Simone Andrea Ganz | Juventus | Pescara | Undisclosed |
| 12 July 2017 | Antonio Donnarumma | (Greece) Asteras Tripolis | Milan | Undisclosed |
| 12 July 2017 | (Bosnia and Herzegovina) Ervin Zukanović | Roma | Genoa | Loan |
| 12 July 2017 | Francesco Fedato | Sampdoria | Foggia | Undisclosed |
| 12 July 2017 | Francesco Renzetti | Genoa | Cremonese | Loan |
| 12 July 2017 | Christian Ventola | Pescara | Teramo | Loan |
| 12 July 2017 | Michele Di Gregorio | Inter | Renate | Loan |
| 12 July 2017 | Alessandro Mattioli | Inter | Renate | Loan |
| 12 July 2017 | (Brazil) Dani Alves | Juventus | (France) Paris Saint-Germain | Free |
| 12 July 2017 | Francesco Karkalis | Pescara | Bassano | Loan |
| 12 July 2017 | (Brazil) Douglas Costa | (Germany) Bayern Munich | Juventus | Loan |
| 12 July 2017 | Alex Ferrari | Bologna | Verona | Loan |
| 12 July 2017 | (Argentina) Franco Zuculini | Bologna | Verona | Undisclosed |
| 12 July 2017 | Federico Proia | Spezia | Bassano | Loan |
| 12 July 2017 | (France) Thomas Heurtaux | Udinese | Verona | Loan |
| 12 July 2017 | (Czech Republic) Martin Graiciar | (Czech Republic) Slovan Liberec | Fiorentina | Undisclosed |
| 12 July 2017 | Michele Castagnetti | S.P.A.L. | Empoli | Loan |
| 12 July 2017 | Danilo Russo | Juve Stabia | Venezia | Loan |
| 12 July 2017 | Caleb Ekuban | Chievo | (England) Leeds United | Undisclosed |
| 12 July 2017 | Alberto Boniotti | Brescia | Pordenone | Loan |
| 12 July 2017 | Alessandro Capello | Cagliari | Padova | Loan |
| 12 July 2017 | Diego Albadoro | Fondi | Ternana | Undisclosed |
| 12 July 2017 | Giovanni Sbrissa | Sassuolo | Cesena | Loan |
| 12 July 2017 | Ettore Gliozzi | Sassuolo | Cesena | Loan |
| 13 July 2017 | Tommaso Cucchietti | Torino | Reggina | Loan |
| 13 July 2017 | Simone Auriletto | Torino | Reggina | Loan |
| 13 July 2017 | Antonio Floro Flores | Chievo | Bari | Loan |
| 13 July 2017 | (Brazil) Nenê | Spezia | Bari | Free |
| 13 July 2017 | (Senegal) Layousse Diallo | Avellino | Bisceglie | Loan |
| 13 July 2017 | (Albania) Berat Djimsiti | Atalanta | Benevento | Loan |
| 13 July 2017 | Giacomo Sciacca | Inter | Alessandria | Undisclosed |
| 13 July 2017 | Andrea Romanò | Inter | Monza | Loan |
| 13 July 2017 | Andrea Costa | Empoli | Benevento | Undisclosed |
| 13 July 2017 | Daniele Buzzegoli | Benevento | Ascoli | Undisclosed |
| 13 July 2017 | Luca Matarese | Genoa | Frosinone | Undisclosed |
| 13 July 2017 | Giuseppe Caccavallo | Venezia | Cosenza | Loan |
| 13 July 2017 | Davide Frattesi | Roma | Sassuolo | Undisclosed |
| 13 July 2017 | Riccardo Marchizza | Roma | Sassuolo | Undisclosed |
| 13 July 2017 | (Argentina) Tiago Casasola | Roma | Alessandria | Undisclosed |
| 14 July 2017 | (Kosovo) Samir Ujkani | Genoa | Cremonese | Loan |
| 14 July 2017 | Daniele Croce | Empoli | Cremonese | Loan |
| 14 July 2017 | (Spain) Raúl Asencio | Genoa | Avellino | Loan |
| 14 July 2017 | Riccardo Orsolini | Juventus | Atalanta | 2-year loan |
| 14 July 2017 | Leonardo Bonucci | Juventus | Milan | €42M |
| 14 July 2017 | (Uruguay) Leandro Cabrera | (Spain) Zaragoza | Crotone | Free |
| 14 July 2017 | Tommaso Polo | Chievo | Prato | Loan |
| 14 July 2017 | Nicholas Siega | Vicenza | Cittadella | Undisclosed |
| 14 July 2017 | Paolo Pellicanò | Venezia | AlbinoLeffe | Loan |
| 14 July 2017 | (Portugal) Roberto | (Portugal) Arouca | Salernitana | Free |
| 14 July 2017 | (France) Sofiane Ahmed-Kadi | Lanusei | Salernitana | Free |
| 14 July 2017 | (Portugal) Alex | (Portugal) Vitória | Salernitana | Undisclosed |
| 14 July 2017 | (North Korea) Song Hyok Choe | Unattached | Perugia | Free |
| 14 July 2017 | (Liechtenstein) Yanik Frick | (Austria) Altach | Perugia | Free |
| 14 July 2017 | Ivan Pelizzoli | Piacenza | Foggia | Free |
| 15 July 2017 | (Croatia) Anton Krešić | Atalanta | Avellino | Loan |
| 15 July 2017 | (Romania) Ionuț Radu | Inter | Avellino | Loan |
| 15 July 2017 | Luca Valzania | Atalanta | Pescara | Loan |
| 15 July 2017 | Gianluca Di Chiara | Perugia | Benevento | Undisclosed |
| 15 July 2017 | (Argentina) Federico Fazio | (England) Tottenham | Roma | Undisclosed |
| 15 July 2017 | Andrea Bertolacci | Milan | Genoa | Loan |
| 15 July 2017 | Marco Martin | Cittadella | FeralpiSalò | Undisclosed |
| 15 July 2017 | Mirko Carretta | Matera | Ternana | Undisclosed |
| 15 July 2017 | Matteo Ricci | Roma | Salernitana | Loan |
| 15 July 2017 | Luca Siligardi | Verona | Parma | Free |
| 15 July 2017 | Eros De Santis | Roma | Virtus Entella | Loan |
| 15 July 2017 | Antonio Narciso | Foggia | Sicula Leonzio | Loan |
| 16 July 2017 | (Turkey) Cengiz Ünder | (Turkey) İstanbul Başakşehir | Roma | €13,4M |
| 16 July 2017 | (Argentina) Lucas Biglia | Lazio | Milan | Undisclosed |
| 17 July 2017 | Francesco Bardi | Inter | Frosinone | Loan |
| 17 July 2017 | Filippo Sgarbi | Inter | Südtirol | Loan |
| 17 July 2017 | Gian Filippo Felicioli | Milan | Verona | 2-year loan |
| 17 July 2017 | (Norway) Rafik Zekhnini | (Norway) Odd | Fiorentina | Undisclosed |
| 17 July 2017 | (Bulgaria) Petko Hristov | (Bulgaria) Slavia Sofia | Fiorentina | Undisclosed |
| 17 July 2017 | Luca Germoni | Lazio | Parma | Loan |
| 17 July 2017 | Daniel Bezziccheri | Lazio | Reggina | Loan |
| 17 July 2017 | (Ecuador) Bryan Cabezas | Atalanta | (Greece) Panathinaikos | Loan |
| 17 July 2017 | Nicolò Fazzi | Atalanta | Cesena | Loan |
| 18 July 2017 | Davide Adorni | Santarcangelo | Cittadella | Undisclosed |
| 18 July 2017 | (Spain) Álex Berenguer | (Spain) Osasuna | Torino | Undisclosed |
| 18 July 2017 | Marco D'Alessandro | Atalanta | Benevento | Loan |
| 18 July 2017 | (Brazil) Lucas Leiva | (England) Liverpool | Lazio | Undisclosed |
| 18 July 2017 | Davide Riccardi | Verona | Lecce | Loan |
| 18 July 2017 | (Ivory Coast) Eddy Gnahoré | Napoli | Palermo | Loan |
| 18 July 2017 | Gianluca Lapadula | Milan | Genoa | Loan |
| 18 July 2017 | Giuseppe De Luca | Atalanta | Virtus Entella | Loan |
| 18 July 2017 | (Portugal) Aníbal Capela | (Portugal) Rio Ave | Carpi | Free |
| 18 July 2017 | (Serbia) Lazar Petković | Carpi | Pisa | Loan |
| 18 July 2017 | Antonio Romano | Napoli | Carpi | Loan |
| 18 July 2017 | Armando Anastasio | Napoli | Carpi | Loan |
| 18 July 2017 | Matteo Solini | Chievo | Carpi | Loan |
| 18 July 2017 | Giovanni Boggian | Savona | Carpi | Undisclosed |
| 18 July 2017 | Giovanni Boggian | Carpi | Pistoiese | Loan |
| 18 July 2017 | Federico Palmieri | Carpi | Santarcangelo | Loan |
| 18 July 2017 | Giancarlo Malcore | Manfredonia | Carpi | Loan |
| 18 July 2017 | (Poland) Paweł Jaroszyński | (Poland) Cracovia | Chievo | Undisclosed |
| 18 July 2017 | Luigi Luciani | Venezia | Santarcangelo | Loan |
| 18 July 2017 | (Colombia) Andrés Tello | Juventus | Bari | Loan |
| 18 July 2017 | Daniel Offredi | Avellino | Südtirol | Undisclosed |
| 18 July 2017 | Matteo Gasperoni | Atalanta | Cesena | Undisclosed |
| 19 July 2017 | (Poland) Wojciech Szczęsny | (England) Arsenal | Juventus | €12,2M |
| 19 July 2017 | Marco Silvestri | (England) Leeds United | Verona | Undisclosed |
| 19 July 2017 | Danilo Cataldi | Lazio | Benevento | Loan |
| 19 July 2017 | (Uruguay) Cesar Falletti | (Paraguay) Sportivo Luqueño | Bologna | Undisclosed |
| 19 July 2017 | Alberto Dossena | Atalanta | Perugia | Loan |
| 19 July 2017 | Ignazio Battista | Ternana | Matera | Loan |
| 19 July 2017 | Luca Barlocco | Juventus | Pro Vercelli | Loan |
| 19 July 2017 | Paolo Ghiglione | Genoa | Pro Vercelli | Loan |
| 20 July 2017 | Mattia De Sciglio | Milan | Juventus | €12M |
| 20 July 2017 | (France) Grégoire Defrel | Sassuolo | Roma | €5+15M |
| 20 July 2017 | Simone Minelli | Fiorentina | Trapani | Loan |
| 20 July 2017 | Vincenzo Silvestro | Bologna | Pordenone | Loan |
| 20 July 2017 | (Romania) Deian Boldor | Bologna | (Canada) Montreal Impact | Loan |
| 20 July 2017 | Simone Romagnoli | Carpi | Empoli | Loan |
| 20 July 2017 | Andrea Esposito | Vicenza | Cesena | Undisclosed |
| 20 July 2017 | Cristian Pasquato | Juventus | (Poland) Legia Warsaw | Undisclosed |
| 21 July 2017 | Mattia Trovato | Fiorentina | Cosenza | Loan |
| 21 July 2017 | Davide Di Gennaro | Cagliari | Lazio | Free |
| 21 July 2017 | (Finland) Sauli Väisänen | (Sweden) AIK | S.P.A.L. | Undisclosed |
| 21 July 2017 | (Romania) Alexandru Mitriță | Pescara | (Romania) CSU Craiova | Loan |
| 21 July 2017 | Francesco Orlando | Vicenza | Lazio | Undisclosed |
| 21 July 2017 | Francesco Cassata | Juventus | Sassuolo | Undisclosed |
| 21 July 2017 | (Chile) Mauricio Isla | Cagliari | (Turkey) Fenerbahçe | Free |
| 21 July 2017 | (Chile) Mauricio Pinilla | Genoa | Universidad de Chile | Undisclosed |
| 21 July 2017 | (Argentina) Leonel Vangioni | Milan | (Mexico) Monterrey | Undisclosed |
| 21 July 2017 | (Brazil) Victor da Silva | Chievo | Fermana | Loan |
| 21 July 2017 | Alessandro Roma | Chievo | Fermana | Loan |
| 21 July 2017 | (Bulgaria) Radoslav Kirilov | Chievo | (Bulgaria) Pirin | Loan |
| 21 July 2017 | (Brazil) Claiton | Crotone | Cremonese | Undisclosed |
| 22 July 2017 | (Lithuania) Marius Adamonis | Lazio | Salernitana | Loan |
| 22 July 2017 | (Democratic Republic of the Congo) Luzayadio Bangu | Fiorentina | Vicenza | Loan |
| 22 July 2017 | (North Macedonia) Isnik Alimi | Atalanta | Vicenza | Loan |
| 22 July 2017 | Luca Milesi | Atalanta | Vicenza | Loan |
| 22 July 2017 | Marcello Trotta | Sassuolo | Crotone | Loan |
| 22 July 2017 | Fabio Tito | Foggia | Modena | Loan |
| 22 July 2017 | Stefan Dimitrijevic | Bassano | Bologna | Undisclosed |
| 22 July 2017 | (Venezuela) Franco Signorelli | Spezia | Salernitana | Undisclosed |
| 23 July 2017 | (Argentina) Mariano Julio Izco | Chievo | Crotone | Free |
| 23 July 2017 | (Croatia) Hrvoje Milić | Fiorentina | (Greece) Olympiacos | Undisclosed |
| 24 July 2017 | Francesco Orlando | Lazio | Salernitana | Loan |
| 24 July 2017 | (Austria) Marcel Büchel | Empoli | Verona | Loan |
| 24 July 2017 | Federico Bachis | Torres | Parma | Free |
| 24 July 2017 | Fabio Eguelfi | Atalanta | Cesena | Loan |
| 24 July 2017 | (Ghana) Isaac Donkor | Inter | Cesena | Undisclosed |
| 24 July 2017 | Damiano Zanon | Ternana | Perugia | Free |
| 24 July 2017 | Alberto Cerri | Juventus | Perugia | Loan |
| 24 July 2017 | Federico Bernardeschi | Fiorentina | Juventus | €40M |
| 24 July 2017 | Emanuele Suagher | Atalanta | Avellino | Loan |
| 24 July 2017 | Tommaso Augello | Giana Erminio | Spezia | Undisclosed |
| 24 July 2017 | (Poland) Radosław Murawski | (Poland) Piast Gliwice | Palermo | Undisclosed |
| 25 July 2017 | (France) Jordan Veretout | (England) Aston Villa | Fiorentina | Undisclosed |
| 25 July 2017 | Federico Barba | Empoli | (Spain) Sporting Gijón | Undisclosed |
| 25 July 2017 | Riccardo Santovito | Latina | Parma | Free |
| 25 July 2017 | Jacopo Dezi | Napoli | Parma | Loan |
| 25 July 2017 | Roberto Insigne | Napoli | Parma | Loan |
| 25 July 2017 | Simone Emmanuello | Atalanta | Perugia | Loan |
| 25 July 2017 | (Colombia) Víctor Ibarbo | Cagliari | (Japan) Sagan Tosu | Undisclosed |
| 25 July 2017 | (Democratic Republic of the Congo) Benjamin Mokulu | Avellino | Cremonese | Loan |
| 25 July 2017 | Salvatore D'Elia | Vicenza | Bari | Undisclosed |
| 25 July 2017 | Simone Farelli | Trapani | Novara | Undisclosed |
| 25 July 2017 | Francesco Pacini | Novara | Trapani | Loan |
| 26 July 2017 | Antonio Di Gaudio | Carpi | Parma | Undisclosed |
| 26 July 2017 | Federico Serraiocco | Brescia | Carpi | Free |
| 26 July 2017 | Mario Prezioso | Napoli | Carpi | Loan |
| 26 July 2017 | (Slovenia) Luka Krajnc | Cagliari | Frosinone | Loan |
| 26 July 2017 | (Croatia) Ricardo Bagadur | Fiorentina | Brescia | Undisclosed |
| 26 July 2017 | Enzo Di Santantonio | Mantova | Brescia | Free |
| 26 July 2017 | (Spain) Miguel Angel Maza | Foggia | Pordenone | Loan |
| 26 July 2017 | Enrico Baldini | Inter | Ascoli | Undisclosed |
| 26 July 2017 | (Lithuania) Vykintas Slivka | Juventus | (Scotland) Hibernian | Undisclosed |
| 26 July 2017 | Giacomo Beretta | Milan | Foggia | Undisclosed |
| 26 July 2017 | Andrea Badan | Verona | Prato | Loan |
| 26 July 2017 | Nicola Guglielmelli | Verona | Prato | Loan |
| 26 July 2017 | (Ghana) Carlos Buxton Opoku | Verona | Paganese | Loan |
| 26 July 2017 | Edoardo Pavan | Verona | Paganese | Loan |
| 27 July 2017 | Fausto Coppola | Entella | AlbinoLeffe | Undisclosed |
| 27 July 2017 | Riccardo Baroni | Fiorentina | Lucchese | Loan |
| 27 July 2017 | Alessio Militari | Fiorentina | Cesena | Undisclosed |
| 27 July 2017 | (Romania) Ciprian Tătărușanu | Fiorentina | (France) Nantes | Undisclosed |
| 27 July 2017 | (Senegal) Moustapha Seck | Roma | Empoli | Loan |
| 27 July 2017 | Alex Valentini | Spezia | Vicenza | Undisclosed |
| 27 July 2017 | (Senegal) Abou Diop | Torino | Bassano | Loan |
| 27 July 2017 | Nicola Leali | Juventus | (Belgium) Zulte Waregem | Loan |
| 27 July 2017 | (Sweden) Pa Konate | (Sweden) Malmö | S.P.A.L. | Loan |
| 27 July 2017 | Alberto Grassi | Napoli | S.P.A.L. | Loan |
| 28 July 2017 | (Ghana) Amidu Salifu | Fiorentina | Vicenza | Loan |
| 28 July 2017 | (Latvia) Kristaps Zommers | Parma | Pordenone | Loan |
| 28 July 2017 | Sebastiano Longo | Messina | Parma | Free |
| 28 July 2017 | Dario Del Fabro | Cagliari | Juventus | Undisclosed |
| 28 July 2017 | Filippo Romagna | Juventus | Cagliari | Undisclosed |
| 28 July 2017 | Marcello Quinto | Foggia | Fidelis Andria | Undisclosed |
| 28 July 2017 | (Slovenia) Siniša Anđelković | Palermo | Venezia | Free |
| 28 July 2017 | Cristian Riggio | Crotone | Catanzaro | Loan |
| 28 July 2017 | Ibrahima Mbaye | Crotone | Viterbese | Loan |
| 28 July 2017 | Luca Bruno | Crotone | Pro Vercelli | Loan |
| 28 July 2017 | Andrea Tripicchio | Crotone | Casertana | Loan |
| 28 July 2017 | Alessandro Sbaffo | Avellino | AlbinoLeffe | Undisclosed |
| 28 July 2017 | Alex Pederzoli | Venezia | Piacenza | Loan |
| 28 July 2017 | Daniele Capelli | Cesena | Spezia | Free |
| 28 July 2017 | Jacopo Ciarmela | Ascoli | Fermana | Loan |
| 29 July 2017 | Riccardo Gagliolo | Carpi | Parma | Undisclosed |
| 29 July 2017 | Edoardo Goldaniga | Palermo | Sassuolo | Undisclosed |
| 29 July 2017 | Leonardo Marson | Palermo | Sassuolo | Loan |
| 31 July 2017 | Gabriel Montaperto | Cagliari | Fondi | Loan |
| 31 July 2017 | Filippo Bandinelli | Sassuolo | Perugia | Loan |
| 31 July 2017 | Riccardo Bocalon | Alessandria | Salernitana | Undisclosed |

=== August ===
| Date | Name | Moving from | Moving to | Fee |
|---|---|---|---|---|
| 1 August 2017 | (Brazil) Rodrigo Ely | Milan | (Spain) Alavés | Undisclosed |
| 1 August 2017 | Andrea Tabanelli | Cesena | Padova | Undisclosed |
| 1 August 2017 | Alex Meret | Udinese | S.P.A.L. | Loan |
| 1 August 2017 | Andrea Dini | San Marino | Parma | Free |
| 2 August 2017 | (Uruguay) Matías Vecino | Fiorentina | Inter | Undisclosed |
| 2 August 2017 | Carmine Setola | Cesena | Palermo | Undisclosed |
| 2 August 2017 | Carmine Setola | Palermo | Cesena | Loan |
| 2 August 2017 | Andrea Fulignati | Palermo | Cesena | Undisclosed |
| 2 August 2017 | (Guinea) Gaston Camara | Inter | (Portugal) Gil Vicente | Loan |
| 2 August 2017 | (The Gambia) Ali Sowe | Chievo | (Albania) Skënderbeu | Loan |
| 2 August 2017 | (Croatia) Antonio Lukanović | Novara | Catanzaro | Loan |
| 2 August 2017 | Hicham Kanis | Novara | Catanzaro | Loan |
| 2 August 2017 | Johad Ferretti | Cremonese | Ternana | Undisclosed |
| 2 August 2017 | (Ecuador) Felipe Caicedo | (Spain) Espanyol | Lazio | Undisclosed |
| 2 August 2017 | (Senegal) Ameth Lo | Lazio | (Malta) Naxxar Lions | Undisclosed |
| 2 August 2017 | Salvatore Molina | Atalanta | Avellino | Loan |
| 2 August 2017 | Federico Varano | Cesena | Fano | Loan |
| 2 August 2017 | Alessandro Gazzi | Palermo | Alessandria | Free |
| 2 August 2017 | Luca Verna | Pisa | Carpi | Loan |
| 2 August 2017 | Saber Hraiech | Piacenza | Carpi | Undisclosed |
| 2 August 2017 | Daniele Sarzi Puttini | Carpi | Piacenza | Loan |
| 2 August 2017 | Simone Della Latta | Carpi | Piacenza | Undisclosed |
| 2 August 2017 | Giovanni Crociata | Milan | Crotone | Loan |
| 2 August 2017 | (Poland) Przemysław Szymiński | (Poland) Wisła Płock | Palermo | Undisclosed |
| 2 August 2017 | Giuseppe Bellusci | (England) Leeds United | Palermo | Free |
| 2 August 2017 | Ivan De Santis | Milan | Ascoli | Undisclosed |
| 3 August 2017 | (Hungary) Krisztián Adorján | Novara | (Albania) Partizani Tirana | Loan |
| 3 August 2017 | Loris Tortori | Venezia | Viterbese | Loan |
| 3 August 2017 | (Romania) Sergiu Suciu | Pordenone | Venezia | Loan |
| 3 August 2017 | Sebastiano Luperto | Napoli | Empoli | Loan |
| 3 August 2017 | Giovanni Pinto | Monopoli | Parma | Free |
| 4 August 2017 | Matteo Cotali | Cagliari | Olbia | Loan |
| 4 August 2017 | Alessio Murgia | Cagliari | Olbia | Loan |
| 4 August 2017 | Simone Pinna | Cagliari | Olbia | Loan |
| 4 August 2017 | Nicola Manca | Cagliari | Olbia | Loan |
| 4 August 2017 | Roberto Biancu | Cagliari | Olbia | Loan |
| 4 August 2017 | Raffaele Bianco | Carpi | Perugia | Undisclosed |
| 4 August 2017 | (Uruguay) Gastón Ramírez | (England) Middlesbrough | Sampdoria | Undisclosed |
| 4 August 2017 | Adriano Montalto | Juve Stabia | Ternana | Free |
| 4 August 2017 | Matteo Capitani | Unattached | Ternana | Free |
| 4 August 2017 | Riccardo Maniero | Bari | Novara | Undisclosed |
| 4 August 2017 | Gian Marco Ferrari | Sassuolo | Sampdoria | Loan |
| 4 August 2017 | (France) Kylian Ramè | (France) Stade Bordelais | Foggia | Loan |
| 4 August 2017 | Dario Del Fabro | Juventus | Novara | Loan |
| 4 August 2017 | Andrea Zaccagno | Torino | Pistoiese | Loan |
| 4 August 2017 | Alessio Benedetti | Torino | Carrarese | Loan |
| 4 August 2017 | Gianluca Piccoli | Torino | Ravenna | Loan |
| 4 August 2017 | Matteo Rossetti | Torino | Alessandria | Loan |
| 4 August 2017 | Patrick Ciurria | Spezia | Pordenone | Loan |
| 4 August 2017 | (Bosnia and Herzegovina) Riad Bajić | (Turkey) Konyaspor | Udinese | Undisclosed |
| 4 August 2017 | (Tunisia) Karim Laribi | Sassuolo | Cesena | Undisclosed |
| 4 August 2017 | (Poland) Paweł Dawidowicz | (Portugal) Benfica | Palermo | Loan |
| 4 August 2017 | (Uruguay) Martín Cáceres | (England) Southampton | Verona | Free |
| 4 August 2017 | Mauro Vigorito | Vicenza | Frosinone | Free |
| 5 August 2017 | (Cameroon) Nicolas Nkoulou | (France) Lyon | Torino | Loan |
| 5 August 2017 | Rolando Mandragora | Juventus | Crotone | Loan |
| 5 August 2017 | Alberto Toscano | Palermo | Siracusa | Loan |
| 5 August 2017 | (Albania) Shaqir Tafa | Palermo | Monopoli | Loan |
| 5 August 2017 | Marco Romizi | Bari | Vicenza | Undisclosed |
| 5 August 2017 | Nicola Turi | Bari | Vicenza | Loan |
| 7 August 2017 | Mirko Bizzi | Cagliari | Varese | Loan |
| 7 August 2017 | (France) M'Bala Nzola | Virtus Francavilla | Carpi | Undisclosed |
| 7 August 2017 | (Croatia) Marko Pajač | Cagliari | Perugia | Loan |
| 7 August 2017 | (North Korea) Han Kwang-song | Cagliari | Perugia | Loan |
| 7 August 2017 | (Argentina) Santiago Colombatto | Cagliari | Perugia | Loan |
| 7 August 2017 | Alberto Pomini | Sassuolo | Palermo | Undisclosed |
| 7 August 2017 | (France) Jonathan Biabiany | Inter | (Czech Republic) Sparta Prague | Loan |
| 7 August 2017 | Mattia Finotto | S.P.A.L. | Ternana | Loan |
| 8 August 2017 | Leonardo Candellone | Torino | Ternana | Loan |
| 8 August 2017 | (Gabon) Mario Lemina | Juventus | (England) Southampton | €17+3M |
| 8 August 2017 | William Jidayi | Avellino | Pro Vercelli | Undisclosed |
| 8 August 2017 | Fabrizio Alastra | Palermo | Prato | Loan |
| 8 August 2017 | Cristian Bunino | Juventus | Alessandria | Loan |
| 8 August 2017 | Alberto Brignoli | Juventus | Benevento | Loan |
| 8 August 2017 | (Argentina) Ezequiel Muñoz | Genoa | (Spain) Leganés | Undisclosed |
| 8 August 2017 | Riccardo Fiamozzi | Genoa | Bari | Loan |
| 8 August 2017 | Davide Luppi | Verona | Virtus Entella | Loan |
| 9 August 2017 | Daniele Giorico | Modena | Carpi | Undisclosed |
| 9 August 2017 | Marco Benassi | Torino | Fiorentina | Undisclosed |
| 9 August 2017 | (France) Valentin Eysseric | (France) Nice | Fiorentina | Undisclosed |
| 9 August 2017 | (Brazil) Dalbert Henrique | (France) Nice | Inter | Undisclosed |
| 9 August 2017 | Nicola Ferrari | Venezia | Vicenza | Undisclosed |
| 9 August 2017 | Mariano Arini | S.P.A.L. | Cremonese | Undisclosed |
| 9 August 2017 | Giovanni Foresta | Crotone | Carrarese | Loan |
| 10 August 2017 | Loris Bacchetti | Pro Vercelli | Monopoli | Undisclosed |
| 10 August 2017 | (Brazil) Gabriel Silva | Udinese | (France) Saint-Étienne | Undisclosed |
| 10 August 2017 | Giovanni Cappiello | Salernitana | Monopoli | Loan |
| 10 August 2017 | Gianmarco Zigoni | Milan | Venezia | Loan |
| 11 August 2017 | (Venezuela) Tomás Rincón | Juventus | Torino | Loan |
| 11 August 2017 | Simone Iocolano | Alessandria | Bari | Undisclosed |
| 11 August 2017 | (Chile) Francisco Sierralta | Udinese | Parma | Loan |
| 11 August 2017 | (Senegal) Maodo Malick Mbaye | Chievo | Carpi | Loan |
| 11 August 2017 | (Guinea) Moussa Souaré | Inter | Monopoli | Loan |
| 11 August 2017 | Davide Costa | Inter | Gubbio | Loan |
| 11 August 2017 | Lorenzo Lollo | Carpi | Empoli | Loan |
| 11 August 2017 | (Uruguay) Walter Alberto López | Benevento | Spezia | Undisclosed |
| 11 August 2017 | (Belgium) Stephane Omeonga | Avellino | Genoa | Undisclosed |
| 11 August 2017 | (Netherlands) Marten de Roon | (England) Middlesbrough | Atalanta | Undisclosed |
| 11 August 2017 | (Argentina) Ricardo Centurión | (Brazil) São Paulo | Genoa | Undisclosed |
| 11 August 2017 | Luca Clemenza | Juventus | Ascoli | Loan |
| 11 August 2017 | (Cameroon) Joseph Minala | Lazio | Salernitana | Loan |
| 11 August 2017 | (Slovenia) Damir Bartulovič | Chievo | (Slovenia) NK Aluminij | Loan |
| 11 August 2017 | (Ghana) Bismarck Ngissah | Chievo | Viterbese | Loan |
| 11 August 2017 | Matteo Brunelli | Chievo | Carpi | Loan |
| 11 August 2017 | Francesco Giorno | Parma | Modena | Loan |
| 11 August 2017 | Giacomo Satalino | Fiorentina | Sassuolo | Undisclosed |
| 12 August 2017 | Andrea La Mantia | Pro Vercelli | Virtus Entella | Undisclosed |
| 14 August 2017 | Alfredo Bifulco | Napoli | Pro Vercelli | Loan |
| 15 August 2017 | (Portugal) Gil Dias | (France) Monaco | Fiorentina | Loan |
| 15 August 2017 | Cristiano Biraghi | Pescara | Fiorentina | Loan |
| 15 August 2017 | (Serbia) Saša Lukić | Torino | (Spain) Levante | Loan |
| 16 August 2017 | (Ghana) Patrick Asmah | Atalanta | Salernitana | Loan |
| 16 August 2017 | (Serbia) Boris Radunović | Atalanta | Salernitana | Loan |
| 16 August 2017 | Leonardo Gatto | Atalanta | Salernitana | Undisclosed |
| 16 August 2017 | Emanuele Padella | Benevento | Ascoli | Free |
| 16 August 2017 | (Croatia) Lorenco Šimić | Sampdoria | Empoli | Loan |
| 16 August 2017 | (Nigeria) Umar Sadiq | Roma | Torino | Loan |
| 16 August 2017 | (Colombia) Carlos Bacca | Milan | (Spain) Villarreal | Loan |
| 16 August 2017 | (Argentina) Giovanni Simeone | Genoa | Fiorentina | Undisclosed |
| 16 August 2017 | Emmanuel Gyasi | Spezia | Südtirol | Loan |
| 16 August 2017 | (Switzerland) Valon Behrami | (England) Watford | Udinese | Undisclosed |
| 17 August 2017 | Francesco Migliore | Spezia | Genoa | Undisclosed |
| 17 August 2017 | Alessandro Polidori | Pescara | Pro Vercelli | Undisclosed |
| 17 August 2017 | (Switzerland) Matteo Fedele | Carpi | Foggia | Undisclosed |
| 17 August 2017 | Michele Troiani | Chievo | Triestina | Loan |
| 17 August 2017 | Matteo Bertollo | Bassano | Bologna | Undisclosed |
| 17 August 2017 | (Argentina) Rodrigo Palacio | Inter | Bologna | Free |
| 18 August 2017 | Alessandro Rossi | Lazio | Salernitana | Loan |
| 18 August 2017 | Cristiano Del Grosso | Atalanta | Venezia | Undisclosed |
| 18 August 2017 | Luca Rossettini | Torino | Genoa | Undisclosed |
| 18 August 2017 | Leonardo Morosini | Genoa | Avellino | Loan |
| 18 August 2017 | Lorenzo Rosseti | Juventus | Ascoli | Undisclosed |
| 18 August 2017 | (France) Blaise Matuidi | (France) Paris Saint-Germain | Juventus | €20+10,5M |
| 18 August 2017 | Luca Maniero | Crotone | Palermo | Undisclosed |
| 18 August 2017 | Francesco Caputo | Virtus Entella | Empoli | Undisclosed |
| 18 August 2017 | (Colombia) Jeison Murillo | Inter | (Spain) Valencia | 2-year loan |
| 18 August 2017 | (Argentina) Germán Pezzella | (Spain) Real Betis | Fiorentina | Loan |
| 18 August 2017 | Federico Angiulli | Pisa | Ternana | Undisclosed |
| 18 August 2017 | Marco Borriello | Cagliari | S.P.A.L. | Undisclosed |
| 18 August 2017 | (Poland) Bartosz Salamon | Cagliari | S.P.A.L. | Loan |
| 18 August 2017 | (Ivory Coast) Yao Eloge Koffi | Inter | (Switzerland) Lugano | Undisclosed |
| 19 August 2017 | Luca Giannone | Ternana | Pisa | Undisclosed |
| 19 August 2017 | (Montenegro) Christian Hadžiosmanović | Sampdoria | Livorno | Loan |
| 22 August 2017 | (The Gambia) Lamin Jawo | Carpi | FeralpiSalò | Loan |
| 20 August 2017 | (Argentina) Facundo Lescano | Parma | Siena | Loan |
| 21 August 2017 | (Uruguay) Jaime Báez | Fiorentina | Pescara | Loan |
| 21 August 2017 | Jacopo Furlan | Bari | Trapani | Loan |
| 21 August 2017 | Biagio Meccariello | Ternana | Brescia | Undisclosed |
| 21 August 2017 | Mattia Aramu | Torino | Virtus Entella | Loan |
| 21 August 2017 | (Paraguay) Juan Iturbe | Roma | (Mexico) Club Tijuana | Loan |
| 21 August 2017 | (Algeria) Ismaël Bennacer | (England) Arsenal | Empoli | Undisclosed |
| 22 August 2017 | Eric Lanini | Juventus | Vicenza | Loan |
| 22 August 2017 | (Brazil) Renato Barbosa Vischi | Vicenza | S.P.A.L. | Loan |
| 22 August 2017 | Gianmario Comi | Pro Vercelli | Vicenza | Loan |
| 22 August 2017 | Roberto Vitiello | Palermo | Ternana | Free |
| 22 August 2017 | (France) Geoffrey Kondogbia | Inter | (Spain) Valencia | Loan |
| 22 August 2017 | (Portugal) João Cancelo | (Spain) Valencia | Inter | Loan |
| 22 August 2017 | Federico Bonazzoli | Sampdoria | S.P.A.L. | Loan |
| 22 August 2017 | Alessandro Berardi | Messina | Bari | Free |
| 22 August 2017 | (Croatia) Nikola Kalinić | Fiorentina | Milan | Loan |
| 22 August 2017 | (Netherlands) Wesley Hoedt | Lazio | (England) Southampton | Undisclosed |
| 22 August 2017 | Jacopo Pagnini | Spezia | Lucchese | Loan |
| 22 August 2017 | Matteo Solini | Carpi | Modena | Loan |
| 22 August 2017 | (Albania) Entonjo Elezaj | Perugia | Fondi | Loan |
| 23 August 2017 | Alessandro Longhi | Pisa | Brescia | Undisclosed |
| 23 August 2017 | Leonardo Nunzella | Parma | Pordenone | Undisclosed |
| 23 August 2017 | Samuele Longo | Inter | (Spain) Tenerife | Loan |
| 23 August 2017 | Nicola Citro | Trapani | Frosinone | Loan |
| 23 August 2017 | Marco Crocchianti | Spezia | Reggiana | Loan |
| 23 August 2017 | Nicolò Sperotto | Carpi | Fermana | Loan |
| 23 August 2017 | Samuele Maurizi | Carpi | Fermana | Loan |
| 23 August 2017 | (Brazil) Paulinho | (Qatar) Al-Arabi | Cremonese | Free |
| 24 August 2017 | Riccardo Marchizza | Sassuolo | Avellino | Loan |
| 24 August 2017 | Daniele Gasparetto | S.P.A.L. | Ternana | Undisclosed |
| 24 August 2017 | (Denmark) Jens Stryger Larsen | Austria Wien | Udinese | Undisclosed |
| 24 August 2017 | (Croatia) Petar Brlek | (Poland) Wisła Kraków | Genoa | Undisclosed |
| 25 August 2017 | Luca Bittante | Empoli | Carpi | Loan |
| 25 August 2017 | Alberto Aquilani | Pescara | (Spain) Las Palmas | Free |
| 25 August 2017 | Matteo Pessina | Atalanta | Spezia | Loan |
| 25 August 2017 | (Brazil) Rogério | Juventus | Sassuolo | Loan |
| 25 August 2017 | Lorenzo Polvani | S.P.A.L. | Empoli | Undisclosed |
| 25 August 2017 | Andrea Gemignani | Empoli | S.P.A.L. | Undisclosed |
| 25 August 2017 | Andrea Gemignani | S.P.A.L. | Gavorrano | Loan |
| 25 August 2017 | Daniele Gastaldello | Bologna | Brescia | Undisclosed |
| 25 August 2017 | (Spain) Pol García | Juventus | Cremonese | Loan |
| 25 August 2017 | Antonio Cinelli | Chievo | Cremonese | Loan |
| 25 August 2017 | (Switzerland) Joel Untersee | Juventus | Empoli | Loan |
| 25 August 2017 | Leonardo Sernicola | Ternana | Matera | Loan |
| 25 August 2017 | Pasquale Di Sabatino | Ternana | Matera | Loan |
| 25 August 2017 | Luca Tremolada | Virtus Entella | Ternana | Loan |
| 25 August 2017 | (Denmark) Joachim Andersen | (Netherlands) Twente | Sampdoria | Undisclosed |
| 25 August 2017 | Francesco Di Nolfo | Perugia | Prato | Loan |
| 25 August 2017 | (Morocco) Omar El Kaddouri | Empoli | (Greece) PAOK | Undisclosed |
| 25 August 2017 | (Netherlands) Gregory van der Wiel | (Turkey) Fenerbahçe | Cagliari | Undisclosed |
| 26 August 2017 | (Uruguay) Andrés Schetino | Fiorentina | (Denmark) Esbjerg | Loan |
| 28 August 2017 | (France) Vincent Laurini | Empoli | Fiorentina | Loan |
| 28 August 2017 | Timothy Nocchi | Juventus | Perugia | Loan |
| 28 August 2017 | (Albania) Ledian Memushaj | Pescara | Benevento | Loan |
| 28 August 2017 | Enrico De Micheli | Inter | Renate | Undisclosed |
| 29 August 2017 | (Montenegro) Stevan Jovetić | Inter | (France) Monaco | Undisclosed |
| 29 August 2017 | (Uruguay) Felipe Avenatti | (Paraguay) Sportivo Luqueño | Bologna | Loan |
| 29 August 2017 | Filippo Falco | Bologna | Perugia | Loan |
| 29 August 2017 | Riccardo Brosco | Verona | Carpi | Loan |
| 29 August 2017 | (Nigeria) Kingsley Michael | (Nigeria) Abuja | Bologna | Free |
| 29 August 2017 | Nicolò Gigli | Fiorentina | Ternana | Undisclosed |
| 29 August 2017 | (Czech Republic) Libor Kozák | (England) Aston Villa | Bari | Free |
| 29 August 2017 | (Senegal) Keita Baldé | Lazio | (France) Monaco | Undisclosed |
| 29 August 2017 | Mirko Eramo | Benevento | Virtus Entella | Undisclosed |
| 29 August 2017 | Francesco Nicastro | Pescara | Foggia | Loan |
| 29 August 2017 | (Czech Republic) Patrik Schick | Sampdoria | Roma | Loan |
| 30 August 2017 | Fabio Castellano | Atalanta | Ascoli | Undisclosed |
| 30 August 2017 | (Brazil) Ítalo | Inter | (Portugal) Olhanense | Loan |
| 30 August 2017 | (Albania) Rey Manaj | Inter | (Spain) Granada | Loan |
| 30 August 2017 | Fabio Della Giovanna | Inter | S.P.A.L. | Undisclosed |
| 30 August 2017 | Giovanni Di Lorenzo | Matera | Empoli | Undisclosed |
| 30 August 2017 | (Nigeria) Stanley Amuzie | Sampdoria | (Switzerland) Lugano | Loan |
| 30 August 2017 | (Sweden) Samuel Armenteros | (Netherlands) Heracles Almelo | Benevento | Undisclosed |
| 30 August 2017 | (Germany) Benedikt Höwedes | (Germany) Schalke 04 | Juventus | Loan |
| 30 August 2017 | (Portugal) Roberto | Salernitana | (Portugal) Arouca | Loan |
| 30 August 2017 | Fabio Gerli | Virtus Entella | Siena | Loan |
| 30 August 2017 | Alessandro De Vitis | Sampdoria | Pisa | Undisclosed |
| 30 August 2017 | (Belgium) Noë Dussenne | Crotone | (Belgium) Gent | Loan |
| 30 August 2017 | (Ghana) Boadu Maxwell Acosty | Crotone | (Croatia) HNK Rijeka | Loan |
| 30 August 2017 | Antonio Balzano | Cagliari | Pescara | Undisclosed |
| 30 August 2017 | Leonardo Pavoletti | Napoli | Cagliari | Loan |
| 30 August 2017 | Michele Rigione | Chievo | Cesena | Loan |
| 31 August 2017 | (Ivory Coast) Christopher Kone | Bassano | Torino | Loan |
| 30 August 2017 | (Togo) Serge Gakpé | Genoa | (France) Amiens | Free |
| 30 August 2017 | (Brazil) Gabriel Barbosa | (Brazil) Palmeiras | S.P.A.L. 2013 | Loan |
| 31 August 2017 | Guido Marilungo | Atalanta | Spezia | Loan |
| 31 August 2017 | Alessandro Bastoni | Atalanta | Inter | Undisclosed |
| 31 August 2017 | Alessandro Bastoni | Inter | Atalanta | 2-year loan |
| 31 August 2017 | (Brazil) Rodrigo Guth | (Brazil) Coritiba | Atalanta | Undisclosed |
| 31 August 2017 | Richard Marcone | Trapani | Pro Vercelli | Undisclosed |
| 31 August 2017 | (Greece) Panagiotis Kone | Udinese | (Greece) AEK Athens | Loan |
| 31 August 2017 | Michele Rocca | Sampdoria | Pro Vercelli | Loan |
| 31 August 2017 | (Montenegro) Filip Raičević | Bari | Pro Vercelli | Loan |
| 31 August 2017 | Iacopo Galli | Crotone | Casertana | Undisclosed |
| 31 August 2017 | Michele Camporese | Benevento | Foggia | Loan |
| 31 August 2017 | Niccolò Belloni | Inter | Carpi | Loan |
| 31 August 2017 | Davide Zappacosta | Torino | (England) Chelsea | Undisclosed |
| 31 August 2017 | (Serbia) Nikola Ninković | Genoa | Empoli | Loan |
| 31 August 2017 | (Albania) Kastriot Dermaku | Empoli | Cosenza | Free |
| 31 August 2017 | Federico Ricci | Sassuolo | Genoa | Loan |
| 31 August 2017 | (Argentina) Nicolás Burdisso | Genoa | Torino | Free |
| 31 August 2017 | Lorenzo Tassi | Inter | Vicenza | Loan |
| 31 August 2017 | (South Korea) Lee Seung-woo | (Spain) Barcelona B | Verona | Undisclosed |
| 31 August 2017 | (France) Cheick Keita | (England) Birmingham | Bologna | Loan |
| 31 August 2017 | (Brazil) Gabriel Barbosa | Inter | (Portugal) Benfica | Loan |
| 31 August 2017 | (Brazil) Danilo Avelar | Torino | (France) Amiens | Loan |
| 31 August 2017 | (Argentina) Cristian Ansaldi | Inter | Torino | 2-year loan |
| 31 August 2017 | (France) M'Baye Niang | Milan | Torino | Loan |
| 31 August 2017 | Vittorio Parigini | Torino | Benevento | Loan |
| 31 August 2017 | (France) Yann Karamoh | (France) Caen | Inter | 2-year loan |
| 31 August 2017 | (Argentina) Maxi López | Torino | Udinese | Undisclosed |
| 31 August 2017 | (France) Anthony Mounier | Bologna | (Greece) Panathinaikos | Loan |
| 31 August 2017 | Alberto Pelagotti | Empoli | Brescia | Undisclosed |
| 31 August 2017 | Nunzio Di Roberto | Crotone | Salernitana | Undisclosed |
| 31 August 2017 | Fabio Ceravolo | Benevento | Parma | Loan |
| 31 August 2017 | Jacopo Petriccione | Fiorentina | Bari | Undisclosed |
| 31 August 2017 | (Slovakia) Martin Valjent | Ternana | Chievo | Undisclosed |
| 31 August 2017 | (Slovakia) Martin Valjent | Chievo | Ternana | Loan |
| 31 August 2017 | (Croatia) Ivan Strinić | Napoli | Sampdoria | Undisclosed |
| 31 August 2017 | Cristiano Lombardi | Lazio | Benevento | Loan |
| 31 August 2017 | (Morocco) Achraf Lazaar | (England) Newcastle | Benevento | Loan |
| 31 August 2017 | (Colombia) Duván Zapata | Napoli | Sampdoria | Loan |
| 31 August 2017 | Gaetano Monachello | Atalanta | Palermo | Loan |
| 31 August 2017 | Marco Berardi | Fiorentina | Südtirol | Loan |
| 31 August 2017 | (France) Cyril Théréau | Udinese | Fiorentina | Undisclosed |
| 31 August 2017 | Simone Lo Faso | Palermo | Fiorentina | Loan |
| 31 August 2017 | (Morocco) Sofian Kiyine | Chievo | Salernitana | Loan |
| 31 August 2017 | (Spain) Alejandro Rodríguez | Chievo | Salernitana | Loan |
| 31 August 2017 | (Portugal) Nani | (Spain) Valencia | Lazio | Loan |
| 31 August 2017 | (Croatia) Ante Rebić | Fiorentina | (Germany) Eintracht Frankfurt | Loan |
| 31 August 2017 | (Serbia) Nenad Tomović | Fiorentina | Chievo | Loan |
| 31 August 2017 | Pietro Iemmello | Sassuolo | Benevento | Loan |
| 31 August 2017 | Luca Antei | Sassuolo | Benevento | Loan |
| 31 August 2017 | Gennaro Scognamiglio | Novara | Cesena | Undisclosed |
| 31 August 2017 | (Netherlands) Ricardo Kishna | Lazio | (Netherlands) ADO Den Haag | Loan |
| 31 August 2017 | Jacopo Manconi | Novara | Carpi | Loan |
| 31 August 2017 | (England) Ravel Morrison | Lazio | (Mexico) Club Atlas | Loan |
| 31 August 2017 | (Serbia) Petar Golubović | Roma | Novara | Undisclosed |
| 31 August 2017 | Stefano Guberti | Perugia | Siena | Undisclosed |
| 31 August 2017 | (Romania) Dan Berci | Juve Stabia | Perugia | Undisclosed |
| 31 August 2017 | Simone Simeri | Novara | Juve Stabia | Loan |
| 31 August 2017 | Marco Moscati | Livorno | Novara | Loan |
| 31 August 2017 | Davide Brivio | Genoa | Virtus Entella | Loan |
| 31 August 2017 | (Sweden) Oscar Hiljemark | Genoa | (Greece) Panathinaikos | Loan |
| 31 August 2017 | (Mali) Alassane També | Genoa | Unattached | Released |
| 31 August 2017 | Marco Crimi | Cesena | Virtus Entella | Undisclosed |
| 31 August 2017 | Daniele Sciaudone | Spezia | Novara | Undisclosed |
| 31 August 2017 | Francesco Bolzoni | Novara | Spezia | Undisclosed |
| 31 August 2017 | Luca Coccolo | Juventus | Perugia | Loan |
| 31 August 2017 | Giovanni Pinto | Parma | Ascoli | Loan |
| 31 August 2017 | Alberto Masi | Bari | Spezia | Loan |
| 31 August 2017 | (Czech Republic) Stefan Simić | Milan | Crotone | Loan |
| 31 August 2017 | Marco Tumminello | Roma | Crotone | Loan |
| 31 August 2017 | (Venezuela) Aristóteles Romero | (Venezuela) Mineros | Crotone | Undisclosed |
| 31 August 2017 | (Switzerland) Daniel Pavlović | Sampdoria | Crotone | Undisclosed |
| 31 August 2017 | Luigi Giorgi | Ascoli | Spezia | Free |
| 31 August 2017 | Antonio Piccolo | Spezia | Cremonese | Undisclosed |
| 31 August 2017 | Simone Bastoni | Spezia | Trapani | Loan |
| 31 August 2017 | (Nigeria) Theophilus Awua | Spezia | Juve Stabia | Loan |
| 31 August 2017 | (Croatia) Božo Mikulić | (Croatia) RNK Split | Sampdoria | Undisclosed |
| 31 August 2017 | Alessandro Ligi | Cesena | Carpi | Undisclosed |
| 31 August 2017 | (Switzerland) Alessandro Martinelli | Sampdoria | Brescia | Undisclosed |
| 31 August 2017 | (Senegal) Racine Coly | Brescia | (France) Nice | Undisclosed |
| 31 August 2017 | Riccardo Gagno | Brescia | Mestre | Loan |
| 31 August 2017 | Gennaro Ruggiero | Palermo | Torino | Loan |
| 31 August 2017 | Felice D'Amico | Palermo | Inter | Loan |
| 31 August 2017 | (Switzerland) Cephas Malele | Palermo | (Portugal) Varzim | Undisclosed |
| 31 August 2017 | (Honduras) Rigoberto Rivas | Inter | Brescia | Loan |
| 31 August 2017 | (Senegal) Lamine N'Diaye | Renate | Brescia | Loan |
| 31 August 2017 | (Croatia) Duje Čop | Cagliari | (Belgium) Standard Liège | Undisclosed |
| 31 August 2017 | (Brazil) Matheus Pereira | Juventus | (France) Bordeaux | Loan |
| 31 August 2017 | (Poland) Mariusz Stępiński | (France) Nantes | Chievo | Loan |
| 31 August 2017 | Roberto Inglese | Chievo | Napoli | Undisclosed |
| 31 August 2017 | Roberto Inglese | Napoli | Chievo | Loan |
| 31 August 2017 | Felice Evacuo | Parma | Trapani | Undisclosed |
| 31 August 2017 | Francesco Signori | Vicenza | Venezia | Free |
| 31 August 2017 | Andrea Bandini | Inter | Brescia | Loan |
| 31 August 2017 | (Slovakia) Norbert Gyömbér | Roma | Bari | Loan |
| 31 August 2017 | (Greece) Vangelis Moras | Bari | (Greece) Panetolikos | Loan |
| 31 August 2017 | Andrea De Falco | Benevento | Matera | Loan |
| 31 August 2017 | (North Macedonia) Nikola Jakimovski | Benevento | Unattached | Released |
| 31 August 2017 | (Guinea) Karamoko Cissé | Benevento | Bari | Undisclosed |
| 31 August 2017 | (Ghana) Daniel Kofi Agyei | Benevento | Carrarese | Undisclosed |
| 31 August 2017 | Moise Kean | Juventus | Verona | Loan |
| 31 August 2017 | (Senegal) Adama Sane | Verona | Juventus | Loan |
| 31 August 2017 | (Mali) Molla Wagué | Udinese | (England) Watford | Loan |
| 31 August 2017 | (Greece) Orestis Karnezis | Udinese | (England) Watford | Loan |

=== September ===
| Date | Name | Moving from | Moving to | Fee |
|---|---|---|---|---|
| 1 September 2017 | (Argentina) Franco Vivas | (Argentina) Banfield | Pro Vercelli | Free |
| 4 September 2017 | (Chile) Matías Fernández | Fiorentina | (Mexico) Club Necaxa | Free |
| 6 September 2017 | Giuseppe Rizzo | Perugia | Salernitana | Free |
| 7 September 2017 | (Netherlands) Djavan Anderson | Unattached | Bari | Free |
| 8 September 2017 | (Argentina) José Sosa | Milan | (Turkey) Trabzonspor | Loan |
| 14 September 2017 | Pier Graziano Gori | Unattached | Venezia | Free |
