= Di Sabatino =

Di Sabatino is an Italian surname. Notable people with the surname include:

- Benoît Di Sabatino, CEO of television production company Banijay Kids & Family
- Pasquale Di Sabatino (born 1988), Italian racing driver
- Pasquale Di Sabatino (footballer) (born 1997), Italian footballer
- Marisa Di Sabatino (born 1977), Italian metallurgist and professor in Norway
