= Cappiello (surname) =

Cappiello is a surname. Notable people with the surname include:

- David Cappiello (born 1968), American politician
- Giovanni Cappiello (born 1997), Italian association football player
- Juan Cappiello (born 1992), Argentine rugby union player
- Katie Cappiello, American dramatist
- Leonetto Cappiello (1875–1942), Italian and French painter
- Rosa Cappiello (1942–2008), Italian writer
- Steve Cappiello (1923–2013), American police officer and politician
