= Giannone =

Giannone is a surname. Notable people with the surname include:

- Karin Giannone (born 1974), British journalist
- Luca Giannone (born 1989), Italian footballer
- Pietro Giannone (1676–1748), Italian historian
- Salvatore Giannone (born 1936), Italian sprinter
