= Gabriel Montaperto =

Italian footballer (born 1997)

Personal information
- Date of birth: 6 September 1997 (age 29)
- Place of birth: Lodi, Italy
- Height: 1.90 m (6 ft 3 in)
- Position: Goalkeeper

Youth career
- –2016: Pergolettese
- 2015–2016: → Cagliari (loan)
- 2016: Cagliari

Senior career*
Years	Team	Apps	(Gls)
2014–2015	Pergolettese	34	(0)
2016–2018	Cagliari	0	(0)
2016–2017	→ Olbia (loan)	9	(0)
2017	→ Südtirol (loan)	1	(0)
2017–2018	→ Fondi (loan)	0	(0)
- * Club domestic league appearances and goals as of 11 November 2017

Gabriel Montaperto (born 6 September 1997) is an Italian footballer who plays as a goalkeeper.

== Club career ==
He made his Serie C debut for Olbia on 27 August 2016 in a game against Renate.

On 31 July 2017, he joined Fondi on loan.
