= Roberto Biancu =

Italian football player (born 2000)

Personal information
- Date of birth: 19 January 2000 (age 26)
- Place of birth: Sassari, Italy
- Height: 1.76 m (5 ft 9 in)
- Position: Midfielder

Team information
- Current team: Olbia
- Number: 21

Youth career
- Cagliari

Senior career*
Years	Team	Apps	(Gls)
2017–2022	Cagliari	1	(0)
2017–2022	→ Olbia (loan)	144	(15)
2022–	Olbia	102	(5)

International career^{‡}
2016	Italy U16	5	(1)
2016–2017	Italy U17	14	(1)
2017–2018	Italy U18	8	(0)
- * Club domestic league appearances and goals as of 20 March 2026 ‡ National team caps and goals as of 9 July 2020

Roberto Biancu (born 19 January 2000) is an Italian football player who plays as midfielder for Serie D club Olbia.

== Club career ==
=== Cagliari ===
On 30 November 2016, at 16, Biancu made his professional debut for Cagliari as a substitute replacing Illia Briukhov in the 77th minute of a 3–0 away defeat against Sampdoria in the fourth round of Coppa Italia. On 28 March 2017 he made his Serie A debut as a substitute replacing Alessandro Deiola in the 80th minute of a 2–1 home win over Milan.

=== Olbia ===
On 16 August 2017, Biancu was signed by Serie C side Olbia on a season-long loan deal. On 15 October he made his Serie C debut for Olbia as a substitute replacing Alessio Murgia in the 83rd minute of a 1–0 away win over Arezzo. On 22 October he played his first entire match for Olbia, a 4–1 home win over Cuneo. On 7 April 2018, Biancu scored his first professional goal in the 90th minute of a 4–2 home win over Livorno. On 10 April he scored his second goal in the 17th minute of a 3–2 home defeat against Arezzo. Biancu ended his season-long loan to Olbia with 23 appearances, 2 goals and 3 assists.

On 17 July 2018, after extended his contract until 2023, his loan to Olbia was extended for another season. On 19 September he played his first match of his second season at Olbia, a 3–2 away win over Albissola, he was replaced after 86 minutes by Antonio Martiniello. On 16 December he played his first entire match of the season, a 4–0 away defeat against Novara. On 17 February 2019, Bianco scored his first goal of the season in the 48th minute of a 3–1 home win over Carrarese. Biancu ended his second season on loan at Olbia with 31 appearances, 1 goal and 1 assist.

On 8 August 2019, Biancu returned for the third season on loan at Olbia. On 25 August, Biancu played his first match of the new season, a 2–1 away win over Robur Siena, he played the entire match. Two weeks later, on 8 September, he scored his first goal of the season in the 11th minute of a 3–2 away defeat against Pontedera. On 26 September he scored his second goal in the 54th minute of a 4–2 away defeat against Carrarese.

On 28 August 2020, the loan was renewed for yet another season.

On 18 August 2021, the loan was renewed once again for the 2021–22 season.

On 3 July 2022, Biancu moved to Olbia on a permanent basis with a contract until June 2024.

On 21 January 2025, Biancu come back to Olbia Calcio 1905 with a two-year contract.

== International career ==
Biancu represented Italy at Under-16, Under-17 and Under-18 levels. On 9 March 2016 he made his debut at U-16 level as a 55th-minute substitute replacing Fabrizio Caligara in a 1–0 away win over Netherlands U-16, two months later he scored his first goal at this level in the 66th minute of a 3–0 away win over Croatia U-16. On 24 August 2016, Biancu made his debut at U-17 level in a 2–0 home win over Bosnia and Herzegovina U-17, he was replaced by Giuseppe Iglio after 72 minutes. On 31 October 2016 he scored his first goal at U-17 level in a 2–0 win over Serbia U-17. Biancu played 5 matches in the 2017 UEFA European Under-17 Championship qualification, he was also in the team who played the 2017 UEFA European Under-17 Championship, however Italy U-17 was eliminated at group stage. On 9 September 2017 he made his debut at Under-18 level in a 3–3 away draw against Slovenia U-18.

== Career statistics ==
=== Club ===
As of match played 20 March 2026

Appearances and goals by club, season and competition
Club	Season	League			Cup		Other		Total	
Club	Season	League	Apps	Goals	Apps	Goals	Apps	Goals	Apps	Goals
Cagliari	2016–17	Serie A	1	0	1	0	—		2	0
Olbia (loan)	2017–18	Serie C	23	2	0	0	—		23	2
Olbia (loan)	2018–19	Serie C	31	1	0	0	—		31	1
Olbia (loan)	2019–20	Serie C	25	3	0	0	—		25	3
Olbia (loan)	2020–21	Serie C	31	5	0	0	—		31	5
Olbia (loan)	2021–22	Serie C	35	4	0	0	1 (Note: Appearance in 2021-22 Serie C playoffs)	0	35	4
Olbia	2022–23	Serie C	35	1	0	0	—		35	1
Olbia	2023–24	Serie C	33	0	0	0	—		33	0
Olbia	2024–25	Serie D	11	0	0	0	—		0	0
Olbia	2025–26	Serie D	23	4	0	0	—		4	4
Olbia	Total Olbia		246	20	0	0	1	0	217	20
Career total			247	20	1	0	1	0	219	20
