= Entonjo Elezaj =

Albanian footballer (born 1996)

Personal information
- Date of birth: 14 July 1996 (age 30)
- Place of birth: Turin, Italy
- Height: 1.95 m (6 ft 5 in)
- Position: Goalkeeper

Team information
- Current team: Nissa
- Number: 1

Youth career
- –2003: Torino
- 2003–2014: Juventus
- 2014: → Virtus Lanciano (loan)
- 2014–2015: Pro Vercelli

Senior career*
Years	Team	Apps	(Gls)
2014–2016	Pro Vercelli	0	(0)
2015–2016	→ Sliema Wanderers (loan)	8	(0)
2016–2018	Perugia	2	(0)
2017–2018	→ Racing Fondi (loan)	37	(0)
2018–2019	Catanzaro	5	(0)
2019–2020	Sliema Wanderers	7	(0)
2020–2021	Kukësi	0	(0)
2021	Sirens	2	(0)
2021–2022	Lanciano		
2022–2023	Akragas		
2023–	Nissa	8	(0)

International career
2012	Albania U17	3	(0)
2013–2014	Albania U19	3	(0)
2014	Albania U21	1	(0)
- * Club domestic league appearances and goals as of 17 November 2024

Entonjo Elezaj (born 14 July 1996) is a professional footballer who plays as a goalkeeper for Italian Serie D club Nissa. Born in Italy, he has represented Albania at youth level.

== Club career ==
=== Early career ===
Elezaj was born in Turin, Italy, to Albanian parents originally from Vlorë. He started his youth career at Torino academies and at age of 6 he was invited for a trial at Juventus in 2003 which he successfully passed and was transferred there. On 1 July 2013, he did well at Primavera team and was included in the Juventus 2013–14 UEFA Youth League squad in which he served as a second choice behind Emil Audero.

In January 2014, he was loaned out to Virtus Lanciano until the end of the 2014–15 season and played with Primavera side in total 11 matches.

=== Pro Vercelli ===
After return from loan, he was sold to Pro Vercelli for a fee of £375k. At Pro vercelli he became part of the first team, as he was trained with coach Cristiano Scazzola, but played as a first choice with primavera team in total 14 matches where he kept 3 clean-sheets. Elezaj participated with the first team in the 2015–16 Coppa Italia match against Alessandria on 9 August 2015, in which he was an unused substitute.

==== Loan to Sliema Wanderers ====
On 15 August 2015, Elezaj was loaned out to Maltese side Sliema Wanderers to gain more professional experience. He made it his debut on 21 August 2015, in the opening match against Tarxien Rainbows coming on as a substitute in the 74th minute in place of the midfielder Peter Xuereb after first choice goalkeeper Glenn Zammit was sent-off as he received a Red card. In the continuation, he had a poor playing space serving mostly as a second choice but also a third choice playing in just two occasions in October. Then in April would come his time as he played the full 90-minutes match against Pembroke Athleta on 2 April 2016, where he managed to keep the clean-sheet as his side won 2–0. During the month, he played in 5 out 6 matches, kept clean-sheets in 2 matches and helped his side to win all 5 matches in which he played, including also the 2015–16 Maltese FA Trophy - Quarter-final one against St. Andrews, where Sliema won 2–1 to qualify for the semi-finals. Into the semi-finals Sliema beat Birkirkara 1–0, where Elezaj played the full 90-minutes to help Sliema reach the grand final. In the final, Sliema played against Balzan, and Elezaj was in the starting line-up. Elezaj kept the clean-sheet for the full 120-minutes match, including extra-time, and then the match directed to Penalty shoot-out, in which Elezaj saved a penalty of opponent and his side won 5–4 to be declared the champions of the 2015–16 Maltese FA Trophy.

Elezaj concluded the 2015–16 season with 8 league appearances, only 1 as a substitute and 3 domestic cup matches.

=== Perugia ===
On 30 July 2016 he signed with Serie B side Perugia a 2-years contract with renewing option.

Elezaj made his professional debut on 1 December 2016 in the 2015–16 Coppa Italia match against Genoa under coach Christian Bucchi. The regular 90-minutes finished in the 2–2 draw and advanced in the Extra time where Genoa won 4–3. Despite conceding 4 goals in total of 120 minutes Elezaj was rated highly with 7 after making several saves against the Argentinian duo Giovanni Simeone & Lucas Ocampos.

=== Catanzaro ===
He joined Serie C club Catanzaro on 18 August 2018.

== International career ==
=== Albania U17 ===
Elezaj was invited at the Albania national under-17 football team by coach Dzemal Mustedanagić to participate in the 2013 UEFA European Under-17 Championship qualifying round from 18 to 23 October 2012. He played every minute during this round's 3 matches ahead of Elhan Kastrati but Albania U17 got eliminated after losing both first games 1–0 to Italy U17 and Hungary U17 and despite beating hard Liechtenstein U17 6–0 in the closing match.

=== Albania U19 ===
Elezaj advanced at the Albania national under-19 football team as he was called up by coach Foto Strakosha to participate in the 2014 UEFA European Under-19 Championship qualifying round from 12 to 17 November 2013. During the tournament he served as a second choice behind Thomas Strakosha for all matches.

He was re-invited to the Albania U19 by a new coach Altin Lala to participate in the 2015 UEFA European Under-19 Championship qualifying round. Under coach Altin Lala he played every minute of this round as Albania U19 was eliminated.

=== Albania U21 ===
Elezaj debuted with Albania national under-21 football team on 6 May 2014 against Italy U21 playing the full 90-minutes match under coach Skënder Gega. He made several notable saves but conceded a penalty goal and the match ended as a 1–0 loss.

== Personal life ==
His inspirations are fellow Goalkeepers, Gianluigi Buffon and Joe Hart where he had the chance to train with them, Buffon during the time that he was trained with the first team of Juventus and with Hart during the time he had a trial at English giants Manchester City.

== Career statistics ==
=== Club ===
As of 21 January 2018

Club statistics
Club	Season	League			Cup		Europe (Note: Including continental competitions, such as UEFA Champions League and UEFA Europa League)		Other (Note: Including other competitions, such as 2016–17 Serie B Play-off)		Total	
Club	Season	Division	Apps	Goals	Apps	Goals	Apps	Goals	Apps	Goals	Apps	Goals
Pro Vercelli	2015–16	Serie B	—		0	0	—		—		0	0
Sliema Wanderers	2015–16	Maltese Premier League	8	0	3	0	—		—		11	0
Perugia	2016–17	Serie B	2	0	1	0	—		0	0	3	0
Perugia	2017–18	Serie B	—		0	0	—		—		0	0
Perugia	Total		2	0	1	0	—		0	0	3	0
Racing Fondi	2017–18	Serie C	21	0	—		—		—		21	0
Career total			31	0	4	0	—		—		35	0

== Honours ==
=== Club ===
Sliema Wanderers

- Maltese FA Trophy: 2015–16
