= Filippo Tiscione =

Italian footballer

Personal information
- Date of birth: 9 December 1985 (age 40)
- Place of birth: Palermo, Italy
- Height: 1.68 m (5 ft 6 in)
- Position: Forward

Team information
- Current team: Licata
- Number: 10

Senior career*
Years	Team	Apps	(Gls)
2003	Siracusa	15	(0)
2004	Cosenza	20	(2)
2004–2005	Vibonese	14	(6)
2005	Trapani	5	(0)
2006	Cosenza	11	(0)
2006–2007	Nissa	18	(16)
2007–2009	Nocerina	44	(11)
2008	→ Trapani (loan)	10	(0)
2010	Melitese		
2010–2011	Valle Grecanica	36	(14)
2011–2012	Licata	31	(23)
2012–2013	Città di Messina	30	(13)
2013–2014	Savoia	30	(8)
2014	Agropoli	12	(4)
2014–2015	Akragas	17	(6)
2015–2017	Racing Fondi	65	(20)
2017–2018	Ternana	14	(0)
2018	→ Matera (loan)	14	(2)
2018	Latina	8	(0)
2018–2019	Siracusa	15	(3)
2019	Casarano	7	(2)
2019–2023	Città di Sant'Agata		
- * Club domestic league appearances and goals as of 20:37, 14 April 2020 (UTC) ‡ National team caps and goals as of clubs23 = Palermo

Filippo Tiscione (born 9 December 1985) is an Italian football player who plays for SSD Academy Palermo Calcio .

== Club career ==
Filippo made his Serie C debut for Racing Fondi on 28 August 2016 in a game against Reggina.

On 16 December 2018, he signed with Siracusa. After a short stint with Casarano, Tiscione joined Eccellenza club ACD Città di Sant'Agata.
