= Mirko Albertazzi =

Italian footballer (born 1997)

Personal information
- Date of birth: 28 June 1997 (age 29)
- Place of birth: Bologna, Italy
- Height: 1.80 m (5 ft 11 in)
- Position: Goalkeeper

Team information
- Current team: Monopoli
- Number: 1

Youth career
- –2015: Bologna

Senior career*
Years	Team	Apps	(Gls)
2015–2018	Bologna	0	(0)
2015–2018	→ Virtus Francavilla (loan)	92	(0)
2018–2020	Vicenza	5	(0)
2020–2021	Entella	0	(0)
2021–2023	Picerno	35	(0)
2023–2024	Brindisi	10	(0)
2024–2025	Sorrento	5	(0)
2025–	Monopoli	19	(0)
- * Club domestic league appearances and goals as of 1 May 2026

Mirko Albertazzi (born 28 June 1997) is an Italian professional footballer who plays as a goalkeeper for Serie C Group C club Monopoli.

== Club career ==
He made his Serie C debut for Virtus Francavilla on 4 September 2016 in a game against Catanzaro.

On 18 August 2020, he signed a 2-year contract with Picerno. However, Picerno was relegated into Serie D due to irregularities, their appeal against the decision was denied, and the contract was cancelled.

On 20 October 2020, he joined Entella in Serie B.

On 7 August 2021 he returned to Picerno, now back to Serie C.
