= Luca Giannone =

Italian footballer

Personal information
- Date of birth: 2 July 1989 (age 37)
- Place of birth: Pomigliano d'Arco, Italy
- Height: 1.74 m (5 ft 9 in)
- Position: Attacking midfielder

Team information
- Current team: Nocerina
- Number: 10

Youth career
- Napoli

Senior career*
Years	Team	Apps	(Gls)
2009–2011	Napoli	0	(0)
2009–2010	→ Lecco (loan)	16	(0)
2010–2011	→ Matera (loan)	25	(10)
2011–2014	Pro Patria	85	(31)
2014	→ Crotone (loan)	14	(3)
2014–2016	Reggiana	26	(5)
2014–2015	→ Bologna (loan)	8	(0)
2016	Casertana	30	(7)
2017	Unicusano Fondi	17	(3)
2017	Ternana	0	(0)
2017–2018	Pisa	27	(2)
2018–2020	Catanzaro	50	(7)
2020–2025	Turris	118	(27)
2025–	Nocerina	29	(5)
- * Club domestic league appearances and goals as of 22 Juny 2026

Luca Giannone (born 2 July 1989) is an Italian footballer who plays as an attacking midfielder for Serie D club Nocerina.

== Career ==
On 18 July 2014, Giannone joined Lega Pro club Reggiana on a two-year contract. On 24 July 2014, he was signed by Serie B club Bologna. He returned to Reggiana on 9 January 2015, having played eight times in the league (Serie B) for Bologna.

Giannone injured his knee in August 2015. He returned to the squad in late September. On 26 January 2016, he left for Casertana.

On 21 January 2017, was sold to Unicusano Fondi.

On 31 August 2020, he joined Turris, newly promoted into Serie C.

== Personal life ==
Giannone has a son Lucas, born in 2015.
