= Giovanni Boggian =

Italian football player

Personal information
- Date of birth: 24 July 1996 (age 30)
- Place of birth: Monza, Italy
- Height: 1.91 m (6 ft 3 in)
- Position: Forward

Team information
- Current team: Imperia

Youth career
- Varese
- –2013: Monza
- 2013–2015: Brescia

Senior career*
Years	Team	Apps	(Gls)
2015–2017	Savona	29	(6)
2016	→ Caravaggio (loan)	12	(0)
2017–2018	Carpi	0	(0)
2017–2018	→ Pistoiese (loan)	4	(0)
2018	→ Paganese (loan)	8	(0)
2018–2019	St. Georgen	21	(2)
2019–	Imperia	7	(2)
- * Club domestic league appearances and goals as of 22:50, 21 December 2019 (UTC)

Giovanni Boggian (born 24 July 1996) is an Italian football player. He plays for A.S.D. Imperia.

== Club career ==
He made his Serie C debut for Savona on 10 October 2015 in a game against L'Aquila.

On 15 September 2018, he joined St. Georgen in Serie D. In the following season, he joined A.S.D. Imperia.
