= Samuele Maurizi =

Italian footballer

Personal information
- Date of birth: 8 September 1995 (age 31)
- Place of birth: Rome, Italy
- Height: 1.83 m (6 ft 0 in)
- Position: Forward

Team information
- Current team: Follonica Gavorrano

Senior career*
Years	Team	Apps	(Gls)
2012–2015	Astrea	41	(6)
2015–2017	Audace Sanvito		(14)
2017–2021	Carpi	38	(4)
2017–2019	→ Fermana (loan)	53	(3)
2021	Pistoiese	17	(1)
2021–2023	Montespaccato	44	(8)
2023–2024	Tivoli	27	(9)
2024–2025	Guidonia	14	(3)
2025–	Follonica Gavorrano	0	(0)
- * Club domestic league appearances and goals as of 4 May 2025

Samuele Maurizi (born 8 September 1995) is an Italian football player who plays for Serie D club Follonica Gavorrano.

== Club career ==
He made his Serie C debut for Fermana on 10 September 2017 in a game against Südtirol.

On 29 January 2021, he moved to Pistoiese.

On 2 July 2021, he joined Serie D club Montespaccato.
