= Marisa Di Sabatino =

Italian metallurgist (born 1977)

Marisa Di Sabatino Lundberg (born 1977) is an Italian physical metallurgist who works in Norway as professor in physical metallurgy in the Department of Materials Science and Engineering of the Norwegian University of Science and Technology (NTNU). Her research concerns the casting, crystallization, and solidification of light metals including crystalline silicon, especially for solar cells, and aluminum alloys.

== Education and career ==
Di Sabatino earned a laurea (the equivalent of a master's degree) from Marche Polytechnic University in Ancona, Italy in 2002. She came to Norway for doctoral study in metallurgy at NTNU, and completed her Ph.D. there in 2005, including also visiting study in the United States at the Worcester Polytechnic Institute.

After working as a researcher for SINTEF from 2007 to 2010, she returned to NTNU as an associate professor in 2010. She has been a full professor since 2017.

== Recognition ==
Di Sabatino is a member of the Royal Norwegian Society of Sciences and Letters, elected in 2019. She was the 2024 recipient of the NTNU Sustainability Award.
