= Simone Paolini =

Italian footballer

Personal information
- Date of birth: 2 April 1997 (age 29)
- Place of birth: San Benedetto del Tronto, Italy
- Height: 1.92 m (6 ft 4 in)
- Position: Midfielder

Team information
- Current team: Santegidiese

Youth career
- Ascoli

Senior career*
Years	Team	Apps	(Gls)
2016–2019	Ascoli	2	(0)
2017–2018	→ Pontedera (loan)	14	(0)
2018–2019	→ Cuneo (loan)	28	(1)
2019–2021	Fano	56	(2)
2022	Pistoiese	10	(0)
2022–2023	Fidelis Andria	26	(3)
2023–2026	Sambenedettese	36	(1)
2026–	Santegidiese	0	(0)
- * Club domestic league appearances and goals as of 26 April 2026

Simone Paolini (born 2 April 1997) is an Italian footballer who plays as a midfielder for Serie D club Santegidiese.

== Club career ==
He made his professional debut in the Serie B for Ascoli on 3 December 2016 in a game against Avellino.

On 26 July 2019, he signed a 2-year contract with Serie C club Fano.

On 31 January 2022, Paolini signed with Pistoiese.

On 24 August 2022, Paolini joined Fidelis Andria.
