= Vincenzo Silvestro =

Italian footballer

Personal information
- Date of birth: 31 July 1998 (age 28)
- Place of birth: Bologna, Italy
- Height: 1.75 m (5 ft 9 in)
- Position: Midfielder

Team information
- Current team: Aglianese

Youth career
- –2017: Bologna

Senior career*
Years	Team	Apps	(Gls)
2017–2018	Bologna	0	(0)
2017–2018	→ Pordenone (loan)	6	(0)
2018–2019	Mantova	34	(2)
2019–2020	Hellas Verona	0	(0)
2019–2020	→ Rimini (loan)	26	(1)
2020–2023	Mantova	79	(1)
2023	Pistoiese	9	(0)
2023–	Aglianese	0	(0)
- * Club domestic league appearances and goals as of 20 December 2023

Vincenzo Silvestro (born 31 July 1998) is an Italian football player who plays as a midfielder for Serie D club Aglianese.

== Club career ==
=== Bologna ===
==== Loan to Pordenone ====
On 19 July 2017, Silvestro was signed by Serie C side Pordenone on a season-long loan deal. On 30 July he made his professional debut as a substitute replacing Sergio Sincu in the 48th minute of a 2–0 home win over Matelica in the first round of Coppa Italia. One week later, on 6 August, he played in the second round in a 2–1 away win over Venezia. On 3 September he made his Serie C debut for Pordenone as a substitute replacing Luca Lulli in the 81st minute of a 3–1 home win over Südtirol. On 5 November he was sent off, as a substitute, with a red card in the 90th minute of a 4–2 home defeat against Triestina. Silvestro ended his season-long loan to Pordenone with only 8 appearances, all as a substitute.

=== Mantova ===
On 11 July 2018, Sivestro joined Serie D side Mantova for an undisclosed fee.

=== Verona ===
==== Loan to Rimini ====
On 12 July 2019 he was bought by Serie A club Verona and immediately loaned to Serie C side Rimini.

=== Return to Mantova ===
On 11 August 2020 he returned to Mantova.

=== Pistoiese ===
On 3 August 2023, Silvestro signed with Pistoiese in Serie D.

== Career statistics ==
=== Club ===
As of match played 3 October 2021

Appearances and goals by club, season and competition
Club	Season	League			National Cup		Other		Total	
Club	Season	Division	Apps	Goals	Apps	Goals	Apps	Goals	Apps	Goals
Pordenone (loan)	2017–18	Serie C	6	0	2	0	1 (Note: Appearance(s) in Coppa Italia Serie C)	0	9	0
Mantova	2018–19	Serie D	34	2	—		5 (Note: Three appearances in Coppa Italia Serie D, two appearances in Promotion Playoffs)	0	39	2
Rimini (loan)	2019–20	Serie C	26	1	—		2	0	28	1
Mantova	2020–21	Serie C	24	0	—		1 (Note: Appearance(s) in Promotion Playoffs)	0	25	0
Mantova	2021–22	Serie C	2	0	—		1	0	3	0
Mantova	Total		26	0	0	0	2	0	28	0
Career total			92	3	2	0	10	0	104	3
