= Dario Del Fabro =

Italian footballer (born 1995)

Personal information
- Date of birth: 24 March 1995 (age 31)
- Place of birth: Alghero, Italy
- Height: 1.90 m (6 ft 3 in)
- Position: Centre-back

Team information
- Current team: Picerno
- Number: 29

Youth career
- 2008–2012: Cagliari

Senior career*
Years	Team	Apps	(Gls)
2012–2017	Cagliari	6	(0)
2014	→ Pescara (loan)	0	(0)
2014–2015	→ Leeds United (loan)	0	(0)
2015–2016	→ Ascoli (loan)	10	(0)
2016–2017	→ Pisa (loan)	33	(0)
2017–2022	Juventus	0	(0)
2017–2018	→ Novara (loan)	19	(0)
2018–2019	→ Cremonese (loan)	3	(1)
2019	Juventus U23	1	(0)
2019–2020	→ Kilmarnock (loan)	22	(1)
2020–2021	→ ADO Den Haag (loan)	19	(0)
2021–2022	→ Seraing (loan)	14	(1)
2022–2023	Cittadella	24	(0)
2023–2024	Yverdon-Sport	31	(0)
2024–2025	Arezzo	11	(0)
2025	→ Catania (loan)	7	(0)
2025–2026	Giugliano	11	(0)
2026–	Picerno	10	(1)

International career
2010–2011	Italy U16	6	(1)
2012	Italy U17	6	(0)
2012–2013	Italy U18	4	(0)
2013–2014	Italy U19	3	(1)
- * Club domestic league appearances and goals as of 1 May 2026

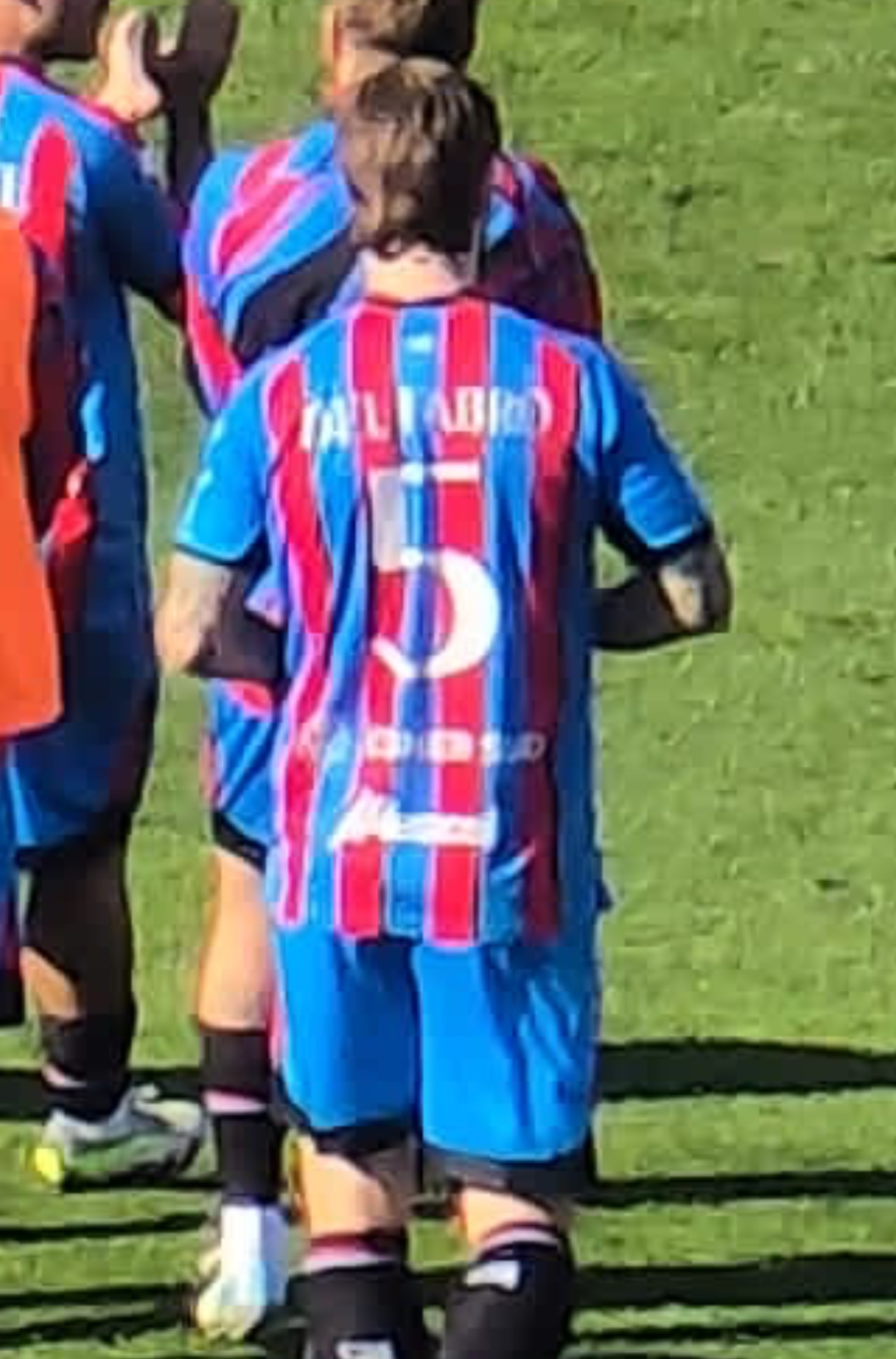

Dario Del Fabro (born 24 March 1995) is an Italian professional footballer who plays as a centre-back for Serie C Group C club Picerno.

== Club career ==
=== Cagliari and loans ===
Del Fabro was born in Alghero and grew up in Sassari, to an Italian father and a Polish mother. He started his career at Cagliari after being spotted by the head of the academy Gianfranco Matteoli. He made his debut in the Coppa Italia on 5 November 2012 against Pescara, playing the full 90 minutes. He made his Serie A league debut on 21 December 2012 against Juventus, coming on for Marco Sau in the 67th minute. In two years he played 8 games between Serie A and Coppa Italia with the Sardinian Club

On 3 August 2014, Del Fabro joined Serie B side Pescara on a season-long loan. The move was later terminated so that he could join Leeds United instead.

On 31 August, Del Fabro signed for former Cagliari owner Massimo Cellino at Leeds United on a season-long loan with the option of a permanent move. He was given the number 35 shirt for the 2014–15 season. On 4 January 2015, he made his début for the club in a 1–0 defeat away to Sunderland in the FA Cup.

On 20 September 2015, Del Fabro was loaned out to Serie B side Ascoli. He debuted on 23 November 2015, in a 3–0 away loss against Cagliari, coming on as a substitute for Michele Canini after 5 minutes of the first half. He ended the campaign with a total of 10 appearances.

On 10 July 2016, Del Fabro completed the loan to another Serie B team, Pisa. At the new team, managed by Gennaro Gattuso, he became one of the starting central defenders for the team from Tuscany, appearing in 32 league and 2 Coppa Italia matches.

=== Juventus ===
On 28 July 2017, Del Fabro joined Juventus for €4.5 million, signing a contract until 2023.

He was loaned to Novara for the 2017–18 season. During this season he played 19 games.

On 31 July 2018, Del Fabro joined Serie B club Cremonese on loan until 30 June 2019. It was a difficult season for the central defender that didn’t play regularly, but he scored his first professional goal in the draw 1–1 against Venice.

On 29 August 2019, Del Fabro moved to Scottish Premiership club Kilmarnock on a season-long loan deal along with fellow Juventus team-mate Laurențiu Brănescu. During his time in Ayrshire, Del Fabro became a regular in central defence with 24 appearances in all competitions and scoring one goal, a 93rd minute equaliser in a 2–2 draw with Hibernian.

On 3 October 2020, Del Fabro signed for Dutch club ADO Den Haag on a one-year loan.

On 26 August 2021, Del Fabbro signed for Belgian side Seraing on a one-year loan.

=== Cittadella ===
On 31 January 2022, Del Fabro returned to Italy and signed with Cittadella.

=== Arezzo ===
On 12 July 2024, Del Fabro signed a two-year contract with Arezzo.

== International career ==
In 2010, Del Fabro was capped by Italy under-16s where he captained the side, before graduating in 2011 to Italy under-17, and then on to Italy under-18s in 2012. In 2013, Del Fabro made his debut for Italy under-19s and scored his first goal in the "Azzurri" shirt.

== Personal life ==
He was born in Alghero to an Italian father and a Polish mother. Aside from his native Italian, he also speaks Polish, and received Polish citizenship in 2019. As a child, he supported Polish clubs Raków Częstochowa and Wisła Kraków.

== Career statistics ==
As of match played 6 August 2023

Appearances and goals by club, season and competition
Club	Season	League			National cup (Note: Includes Coppa Italia, FA Cup, Coppa Italia Serie C, Scottish Cup, KNVB Cup, Belgian Cup)		Other		Total	
Club	Season	Division	Apps	Goals	Apps	Goals	Apps	Goals	Apps	Goals
Cagliari	2012–13	Serie A	3	0	2	0	—		5	0
Cagliari	2013–14	Serie A	3	0	0	0	—		3	0
Cagliari	Total		6	0	2	0	—		8	0
Pescara (loan)	2014–15	Serie B	0	0	1	0	—		1	0
Leeds United (loan)	2014–15	Championship	0	0	1	0	0	0	1	0
Ascoli (loan)	2015–16	Serie B	10	0	0	0	—		10	0
Pisa (loan)	2016–17	Serie B	33	0	2	0	—		35	0
Novara (loan)	2017–18	Serie B	19	0	0	0	—		35	0
Cremonese (loan)	2018–19	Serie B	3	1	0	0	—		3	1
Juventus U23	2019–20	Serie C	1	0	2	0	—		3	0
Kilmarnock (loan)	2019–20	Premiership	22	1	1	0	1	0	24	1
ADO Den Haag (loan)	2020–21	Eredivisie	19	0	2	0	—		0	0
Seraing (loan)	2021–22	Jupiler Pro League	14	1	3	0	—		17	1
Cittadella	2021–22	Serie B	14	0	—		—		14	0
Cittadella	2022–23	Serie B	10	0	1	0	—		11	0
Cittadella	Total		24	0	1	0	—		25	0
Yverdon-Sport	2023–24	Swiss Super League	3	0	0	0	—		3	0
Career total			154	3	15	0	1	0	170	3
