= Marco Crocchianti =

Italian football player

Personal information
- Date of birth: 18 February 1996 (age 30)
- Place of birth: Marino, Italy
- Height: 1.85 m (6 ft 1 in)
- Position: Centre-back

Team information
- Current team: Spoleto

Youth career
- –2013: Tor Tre Teste
- 2013–2015: Spezia

Senior career*
Years	Team	Apps	(Gls)
2015–2020	Spezia	1	(0)
2017–2018	→ Reggiana (loan)	28	(0)
2018–2020	→ Südtirol (loan)	0	(0)
2020–2021	Siena	5	(0)
2021–2022	Ravenna	4	(0)
2022–2023	Ladispoli		
2023–	Spoleto		
- * Club domestic league appearances and goals as of 18:17, 20 September 2023 (UTC)

Marco Crocchianti (born 18 February 1996) is an Italian football player who plays for Spoleto.

== Club career ==
He made his professional debut in the Serie B for Spezia on 2 April 2016 in a game against Cagliari.

On 18 November 2021 he joined Ravenna in Serie D.
