= Sofiane Ahmed-Kadi =

French footballer (born 1997)

Personal information
- Full name: Sofiane Eddy Ahmed-Kadi
- Date of birth: 18 April 1997 (age 29)
- Place of birth: Lyon, France
- Height: 1.77 m (5 ft 10 in)
- Position: Forward

Team information
- Current team: GOAL Futsal Club

Youth career
- –2016: Virtus Entella

Senior career*
| Years | Team | Apps | (Gls) |
| 2016–2017 | Lanusei | 28 | (9) |
| 2017–2020 | Salernitana | 0 | (0) |
| 2018 | → Alessandria (loan) | 7 | (0) |
| 2018 | → Pro Piacenza (loan) | 8 | (0) |
| 2019 | → Foggia (loan) | 1 | (0) |
| 2019–2020 | → Muravera Calcio (loan) | 17 | (2) |

International career^{‡}
| 2023– | Algeria | 1 | (3) |
- * Club domestic league appearances and goals as of 1 March 2020 ‡ National team caps and goals as of 15 December 2023

Sofiane Eddy Ahmed-Kadi (born 18 April 1997) is a football and Futsal Player who plays for GOAL FC and the Algeria national futsal team.

== Club career ==
He started his senior club career at the Serie D club Lanusei.

On 14 July 2017, he signed a 3-year contract with the Serie B club Salernitana.

He did not make any on-field appearances for Salernitana in the first half of the 2017–18 Serie B season, and on 26 January 2018, he joined Serie C club Alessandria on loan for the remainder of the season. He made his Serie C debut for Alessandria on 18 February 2018 in a game against Monza as an 86th-minute substitute for Pablo Andrés González. He finished the loan with 7 appearances for Alessandria, three of them in the starting lineup.

On 25 August 2018, he joined Serie C club Pro Piacenza on a season-long loan. The loan was terminated in January 2019, but he was not registered for Salernitana and didn't play for any team in the second half of the 2018–19 season.

On 10 August 2019, he joined Serie D club Foggia on loan. However, the loan deal was terminated one month later and he joined Muravera Calcio on loan for the rest of the season instead.
