= Rosa Cappiello =

Italian novelist

- Born: Rosa Raffaella Cappiello; 1942 Naples, Italy
- Died: 4 September 2008 (aged 65–66) Italy
- Notable works: Oh Lucky Country, aka Paese Fortunato: Romanzo
- Notable awards: Premio Calabria Prize, 1981; NSW Multicultural Award, New South Wales Premier's Literary Awards, 1985

Rosa Raffaella Cappiello (1942 – 4 September 2008) was an Italian writer, best known for Oh Lucky Country, which won the 1981 Premio Calabria Prize and the 1985 NSW Premier's Literary Awards' Multicultural NSW Award.

== Early life ==
Born in Naples, Italy in 1942, Cappiello migrated to Australia in 1971. Arriving in Sydney as an unskilled worker with no English, Cappiello found work in clothing factories, where she experienced discrimination and exploitation.

== Career ==
Cappiello's first book, I Semi Neri, was published in Italy in 1977, but was mostly written prior to moving to Australia.

Her second book, Paese Fortunato: Romanzo, was published in Italy in 1981 by Feltrinelli, and won the Premio Calabria Prize the same year. Within a month of publication, it had sold 70,000 copies. Cappiello spent a year as writer-in-residence at the University of Wollongong and worked on the English translation with Gaetano Rando. It was published as Oh Lucky Country in Australia by the University of Queensland Press in 1984. When she wrote her book, she was unaware of Donald Horne's The Lucky Country.

She won the NSW Multicultural Award (then known as the Ethnic Affairs Commission Award) at the 1985 New South Wales Premier's Literary Awards for Oh Lucky Country.

Cappiello died in Italy on 4 September 2008.

== Works ==
- I Semi Neri, Edizioni delle donne, Rome, 1977
- Paese Fortunato: Romanzo, Feltrinelli, Milan, 1981
  - Oh Lucky Country, translated by Gaetano Rando, UQP, 1984
