= Enzo Di Santantonio =

French footballer (born 1995)

Personal information
- Date of birth: 11 July 1995 (age 31)
- Place of birth: Toulon, France
- Height: 1.77 m (5 ft 10 in)
- Position: Midfielder

Youth career
- –2013: Sedan
- 2013–2014: Genoa

Senior career*
Years	Team	Apps	(Gls)
2013	Sedan II	1	(0)
2014–2015	Genoa	0	(0)
2014–2015	→ Mantova (loan)	29	(1)
2015–2017	Mantova	55	(3)
2017–2018	Brescia	5	(0)
2018	Santarcangelo	12	(3)
2018–2020	FC Bastia-Borgo	2	(0)
2020–2021	Toulon	5	(0)
- * Club domestic league appearances and goals as of 09:04, 2 February 2022 (UTC)

Enzo Di Santantonio (born 11 July 1995) is a French professional footballer who most recently played as a midfielder for Sporting Club Toulon.

== Career ==
Di Santantonio made his Serie C debut for Mantova on 10 September 2014 in a game against Lumezzane.

== Personal life ==
He is of Italian descent.
