= AZ Picerno =

Italian football club

Picerno
- Full name: Polisportiva AZ Picerno s.r.l.
- Founded: 1973
- Ground: Stadio Donato Curcio, Picerno, Italy
- Capacity: 2,000
- Chairman: Donato Curcio
- Manager: Claudio De Luca
- League: Serie C Group C
- 2025–26: Serie C Group C, 15th of 20
Home colours	Away colours

AZ Picerno, or simply Picerno, is an Italian association football club, representing the town of Picerno, Province of Potenza, Basilicata. It is currently playing in Serie C.

== History ==
Founded in 1973, AZ Picerno mostly languished as an amateur club in the minor league of the Italian football system throughout its history.

The club turned its fortunes thanks to Donato Curcio, a local native who emigrated to the United States in the 1950s who first donated 1 million Euro for a new football stadium (named after him) in Picerno, and then starting investing directly into the club in the later years.

On 18 April 2019, Picerno mathematically ensured their first historical promotion to Serie C after a 0–0 draw with Taranto guaranteed them first place in the Round H of Serie D.

Due to restrictions to the local football stadium "Comunale Donato Curcio", which is unsuitable for professional league games, Picerno played its home games in the 2019–20 Serie C season at the Stadio Alfredo Viviani in neighbouring Potenza. The season ended with Picerno being immediately relegated back to Serie D.

After completing the 2020–21 Serie D season in second place, Picerno was readmitted to Serie C to fill a vacancy for the 2021–22 season.

== Current squad ==
As of 1 September 2026.

Note: Flags indicate national team as defined under FIFA eligibility rules; some limited exceptions apply. Players may hold more than one non-FIFA nationality.

No.	Pos.	Nation	Player
1	GK	ITA	Elia Summa
2	DF	ITA	Marco Perri
4	DF	ITA	Gabriele Bellodi
6	MF	ITA	Andrea Marino
7	FW	SEN	Mamadou Kanouté
8	MF	ITA	Paolo Virgilio
10	MF	ITA	Pasquale Maiorino
11	FW	ITA	Emmanuele Esposito
14	FW	ITA	Destiny Egharevba
16	MF	ITA	Sebastiano Bianchi
17	FW	ITA	Luca Nocerino
19	DF	ITA	Francesco Pistolesi
21	DF	ITA	Giuseppe Salvo
22	GK	ITA	Simone Cortese
23	DF	ITA	Francesco Rillo

No.	Pos.	Nation	Player
26	DF	ITA	Alessandro Bassoli
29	DF	ITA	Dario Del Fabro
30	DF	ITA	Andrea Gemignani
33	GK	ITA	Richard Marcone
34	MF	ITA	Sergio Maselli
44	MF	ITA	Daniele Franco
50	DF	ITA	Antonio Granata
52	MF	ITA	Vittorio Graziani
70	FW	ITA	Andrea Oliviero (on loan from Catanzaro)
72	FW	ITA	Giuseppe Coppola
90	FW	POR	Léo Abreu
92	MF	ITA	Maurizio Scravaglieri
99	MF	ITA	Samuel Pugliese
—	MF	ITA	Simone Cecere

=== Out on loan ===
Note: Flags indicate national team as defined under FIFA eligibility rules; some limited exceptions apply. Players may hold more than one non-FIFA nationality.

No.	Pos.	Nation	Player
—	DF	ITA	Salvatore Torma (at Athletic Club Palermo until 30 June 2027)
