= Layousse Diallo =

Senegalese footballer

Personal information
- Date of birth: 10 January 1997 (age 29)
- Place of birth: Rufisque, Senegal
- Height: 1.80 m (5 ft 11 in)
- Position: Defender

Team information
- Current team: PDHA
- Number: 94

Youth career
- 2009–2014: Tallas Foot Académie
- 2014–2015: Este
- 2015–2016: Fiorentina

Senior career*
Years	Team	Apps	(Gls)
2016–2018	Avellino	8	(0)
2017	→ Casertana (loan)	4	(0)
2017–2018	→ Bisceglie (loan)	7	(0)
2019–2020	Bisceglie	17	(0)
2020–2021	Molfetta	21	(2)
2021	San Luca	6	(0)
2021	Levico Terme	3	(0)
2021–2022	Delta PT	14	(0)
2022–2023	Ragusa	3	(0)
2023–	PDHA	1	(0)
- * Club domestic league appearances and goals as of 24 September 2023

Layousse Diallo (born 10 January 1997) is a Senegalese footballer who plays for Italian Serie D club PDHA.

== Club career ==
After not playing in the 2018–19 season, on 13 August 2019 he returned to Bisceglie.
