= Andrea Gemignani =

Italian footballer (born 1996)

Personal information
- Date of birth: 13 February 1996 (age 30)
- Place of birth: Lucca, Italy
- Height: 1.79 m (5 ft 10 in)
- Position: Right-back

Team information
- Current team: Picerno
- Number: 30

Youth career
- –2015: Empoli

Senior career*
Years	Team	Apps	(Gls)
2015–2017	Empoli	0	(0)
2015–2017	→ Pontedera (loan)	60	(2)
2017–2018	SPAL	0	(0)
2017–2018	→ Gavorrano (loan)	33	(2)
2018–2020	Sambenedettese	36	(0)
2019	→ Alessandria (loan)	18	(1)
2020–2021	Livorno	29	(0)
2021–2022	Seregno	33	(2)
2022–2024	Arzignano	54	(1)
2024–2025	Lucchese	32	(2)
2025–	Picerno	22	(0)

International career
2014	Italy U-18	6	(0)
2014–2015	Italy U-19	7	(0)
- * Club domestic league appearances and goals as of 1 May 2026

Andrea Gemignani (born 13 February 1996) is an Italian professional footballer who plays as a right-back for Serie C Group C club Picerno.

== Club career ==
Gemignani made his Serie C debut for Pontedera on 12 September 2015, in a game against Tuttocuoio.

On 6 November 2020, he joined Livorno as a free agent.

On 4 August 2021, Gemignani signed for Seregno.

On 7 September 2022, he moved to Arzignano on a two-year contract.
