= Tommaso Polo =

Italian footballer

Personal information
- Date of birth: 16 February 1998 (age 28)
- Place of birth: Verona, Italy
- Height: 1.80 m (5 ft 11 in)
- Position: Right-back

Team information
- Current team: Clivense
- Number: 46

Youth career
- –2017: Chievo

Senior career*
Years	Team	Apps	(Gls)
2017–2019	Chievo	0	(0)
2017–2018	→ Prato (loan)	9	(0)
2019–2020	Villafranca	14	(0)
2020–2021	Città di Varese	28	(1)
2021–2022	San Martino Speme	25	(1)
2022–	Clivense	11	(1)
- * Club domestic league appearances and goals as of 20 December 2023

Tommaso Polo (born 16 February 1998) is an Italian professional footballer who plays as a right-back for Serie D club Clivense.

== Club career ==
=== ChievoVerona ===
==== Loan to Prato ====
On 14 July 2017, Polo was signed by Serie C side Prato on a season-long loan deal. On 27 August he made his Serie C debut for Prato on in a 3–1 away defeat against Viterbese Castrense, he played the entire match. On 9 November he suffered an injury and was out for the rest of the season. Polo ended his season-long loan with only 9 appearances, all as a starter, all in the first part of the season, and Prato was also relegated in Serie D.

== Career statistics ==
=== Club ===
As of 29 May 2018

Club	Season	League			Cup		Europe		Other		Total	
Club	Season	League	Apps	Goals	Apps	Goals	Apps	Goals	Apps	Goals	Apps	Goals
Prato (loan)	2017–18	Serie C	9	0	0	0	—		—		9	0
Career total			9	0	0	0	—		—		9	0
