= Jacopo Ciarmela =

Italian footballer

Personal information
- Date of birth: 11 January 1998 (age 28)
- Place of birth: Ascoli Piceno, Italy
- Height: 1.85 m (6 ft 1 in)
- Position: Midfielder

Team information
- Current team: Montegiorgio

Youth career
- Borgo Solestà
- –2012: Ascoli
- 2012–2016: Juventus
- 2015–2016: → Cesena (loan)
- 2016–2017: Ascoli

Senior career*
Years	Team	Apps	(Gls)
2017–2018	Ascoli	0	(0)
2017–2018	→ Fermana (loan)	5	(0)
2018–	Montegiorgio		
- * Club domestic league appearances and goals as of 6 May 2018

Jacopo Ciarmela (born 11 January 1998) is an Italian football player. He plays for Montegiorgio in the Serie D.

== Club career ==
He made his Serie C debut for Fermana on 24 September 2017 in a game against Santarcangelo.
