= Paolo Pellicanò =

Italian footballer

Personal information
- Date of birth: 27 November 1995 (age 30)
- Place of birth: Feltre, Italy
- Height: 1.84 m (6 ft 1/2 in)
- Position: Centre-back

Team information
- Current team: Vittorio Falmec

Youth career
- Feltreseprealpi

Senior career*
Years	Team	Apps	(Gls)
2011–2014	Feltreseprealpi		
2014–2016	Belluno	48	(0)
2016–2018	Venezia	7	(0)
2017–2018	→ AlbinoLeffe (loan)	5	(0)
2018–2019	Belluno	16	(0)
2019–2020	Trento		
2020–2021	Union S. Giorgio Sedico	6	(0)
2021–2022	Fiori Barp Mas		
2022–	Vittorio Falmec		
- * Club domestic league appearances and goals as of 15:47, 27 December 2022 (UTC)

Paolo Pellicanò (born 27 November 1995) is an Italian football player. He plays for Vittorio Falmec.

== Club career ==
He made his Serie C debut for Venezia on 17 September 2016 in a game against Ancona.

On 31 July 2019 it was confirmed, that Pellicanò had joined Trento. In June 2020, Pellicanó moved to newly promoted Serie D club Union San Giorgio Sedico. A year later, in June 2021, he joined Promozione club Fiori Barp Mas. In July 2022, he moved to Eccellenza side Vittorio Falmec.
