= Pasquale Di Sabatino (footballer) =

Italian footballer

Personal information
- Date of birth: 26 February 1997 (age 29)
- Place of birth: Atri, Italy
- Height: 1.87 m (6 ft 1 1/2 in)
- Position: Defender

Youth career
- –2015: Pescara

Senior career*
| Years | Team | Apps | (Gls) |
| 2015–2017 | Pescara | 0 | (0) |
| 2015–2016 | → Ancona (loan) | 3 | (0) |
| 2016 | → Maceratese (loan) | 0 | (0) |
| 2016–2017 | → Fondi (loan) | 4 | (0) |
| 2017–2018 | Ternana | 0 | (0) |
| 2017–2018 | → Matera (loan) | 9 | (0) |
| 2018–2019 | Siracusa | 30 | (1) |
| 2019–2021 | Fano | 33 | (2) |
| 2021–2022 | Vis Pesaro | 25 | (0) |
- * Club domestic league appearances and goals as of 23 April 2022

Pasquale Di Sabatino (born 26 February 1997) is an Italian footballer who plays as a defender.

== Club career ==
He made his Serie C debut for Ancona on 10 October 2015 in a game against Maceratese.

On 3 August 2019, he signed a 1-year contract with Fano.

On 13 January 2021, he joined Vis Pesaro on a 1.5-year contract.
