= Luigi Luciani (footballer) =

Italian footballer

Personal information
- Date of birth: 30 January 1996 (age 30)
- Place of birth: San Severo, Italy
- Height: 1.82 m (5 ft 11 1/2 in)
- Position: Centre back

Team information
- Current team: Fenegrò Calcio

Youth career
- –2015: Sampdoria
- 2014: → Spezia (loan)

Senior career*
Years	Team	Apps	(Gls)
2015–2018	Venezia	26	(3)
2017	→ Arezzo (loan)	2	(0)
2017	→ Santarcangelo (loan)	4	(0)
2018	→ Gavorrano (loan)	0	(0)
2018–2019	OltrepòVoghera	26	(0)
2019	Nardò	0	(0)
2019–	Fenegrò Calcio	13	(0)

International career
2011–2012	Italy U-16	8	(0)
2012–2013	Italy U-17	12	(0)
- * Club domestic league appearances and goals as of 6 July 2018

Luigi Luciani (born 30 January 1996) is an Italian football player. He plays for Fenegrò Calcio.

== Club career ==
He made his Serie C debut for Venezia on 24 September 2016 in a game against Lumezzane.

On 11 September 2018, he joined Serie D club OltrepòVoghera. In the summer 2019, he joined A.C.D. Nardò. He played one game for the club in the Coppa Italia Serie D, before he left the club again to join Fenegrò Calcio only one month after his arrival.
