= Matthias Solerio =

Italian footballer

Personal information
- Date of birth: 1 November 1992 (age 34)
- Place of birth: Cernusco sul Naviglio, Italy
- Height: 1.85 m (6 ft 1 in)
- Position: Defender

Team information
- Current team: Piacenza

Youth career
- Giuxa
- Bussero

Senior career*
Years	Team	Apps	(Gls)
2012–2017	Giana Erminio	86	(4)
2017	→ Avellino (loan)	4	(0)
2017–2018	Avellino	0	(0)
2017–2018	→ Reggina (loan)	19	(0)
2018	→ AlbinoLeffe (loan)	12	(0)
2018–2019	Vicenza	12	(1)
2019–2020	Giana Erminio	25	(2)
2020–2021	Pistoiese	25	(2)
2022	Crema	15	(1)
2022–2023	Luparense	28	(3)
2023–2024	Sangiuliano	0	(0)
2024–	Piacenza	0	(0)
- * Club domestic league appearances and goals as of 2 May 2021

Matthias Solerio (born 1 November 1992) is an Italian footballer who plays as a defender for Serie D Group B club Piacenza.

== Club career ==
He made his professional debut in the Lega Pro (Serie C) for Giana Erminio on 5 September 2014 in a game against Lumezzane. On 31 January 2017 Solerio was signed by Avellino on loan, with an obligation to sign him outright at the end of season. He signed a 2-year contract in June 2017. On 10 July 2017 Solerio left for Reggina.

On 13 July 2018 Solerio was signed by re-established Serie C club Vicenza. He was released from his Vicenza contract by mutual consent on 31 January 2019.

On 21 February 2019, he returned to Giana Erminio until the end of the 2018–19 season.

On 16 September 2020, he signed a one-year contract with Pistoiese.

On 12 July 2023 he joined Sangiuliano.
