= Giovanni Cappiello =

Italian footballer

Personal information
- Date of birth: 26 March 1997 (age 29)
- Place of birth: Salerno, Italy
- Height: 1.85 m (6 ft 1 in)
- Position: Forward

Team information
- Current team: Sanseverinese

Youth career
- –2016: Salernitana

Senior career*
Years	Team	Apps	(Gls)
2015–2019	Salernitana	2	(0)
2016–2017	→ Gelbison (loan)	30	(10)
2017–2018	→ Monopoli (loan)	4	(0)
2018	→ Fidelis Andria (loan)	8	(0)
2018–2019	→ Paganese (loan)	19	(2)
2019	Nola	6	(2)
2019– 2020	Agropoli	3	(0)
2022 – 2023	Sorrento		
2023	Nuova Florida		
2024 – 2025	Costa d'Amalfi	68	(26)
2025 – 2026	Ebolitana	34	(17)
2026 –	Sanseverinese	3	(1)
- * Club domestic league appearances and goals as of 09:34, 14 May 2026 (UTC)

Giovanni Cappiello (born 26 March 1997) is an Italian football player who plays for Sanseverinese

== Club career ==
He made his Serie C debut for Salernitana on 16 May 2015 in a game against Novara.

On 23 July 2019, he joined Serie D club Nola.

In 2025, after various career stints between Costa d'Amalfi, Sorrento and other teams, he moved to Ebolitana Calcio, a team currently in the excellence championship group B

In 2026, he was hired by Ebolitana in Eccellenza Campania Group B. He scored 17 goals and led the Eboli team to Serie D.In the 26/27 season he moved to Sanseverinese in Eccellenza Campania B

== Career statistics ==
As of end of the 2022–23 season

Appearances and goals by club, season and competition (Note: Appearances in Coppa Italia, Coppa Italia Serie C and Coppa Italia Serie D are not available in the source.)
Club	Season	League			National cup (Note: Coppa Italia)		League cup (Note: Includes Coppa Italia Serie C and Coppa Italia Serie D)		Other		Total	
Club	Season	Division	Apps	Goals	Apps	Goals	Apps	Goals	Apps	Goals	Apps	Goals
Salernitana	2014–15	Lega Pro	0	0	—		—		1 (Note: Appearance in the Supercoppa di Lega Pro)	0	1	0
Salernitana	2015–16	Serie B	0	0	—		—		—		0	0
Salernitana	2016–17	Serie B	0	0	—		—		—		0	0
Salernitana	2017–18	Serie B	0	0	—		—		—		0	0
Salernitana	2018–19	Serie B	0	0	—		—		—		0	0
Salernitana	Total		0	0	—		—		1	0	1	0
Gelbison (loan)	2016–17	Serie D	30	10	—		—		—		30	10
Monopoli (loan)	2017–18	Serie C	4	0	—		—		—		4	0
Fidelis Andria (loan)	2017–18	Serie C	8	0	—		—		—		8	0
Paganese (loan)	2018–19	Serie C	19	2	—		—		—		19	2
Nola	2019–20	Serie D	6	2	—		—		—		6	2
Agropoli	2019–20	Serie D	3	0	—		—		—		3	0
Francavilla	2020–21	Serie D	10	1	—		—		—		10	1
Molfetta	2021–22	Serie D	23	2	—		—		—		23	2
Sorrento	2022–23	Serie D	1	0	—		—		—		1	0
Nuova Florida	2022–23	Serie D	10	2	—		—		—		10	2
Career total			114	19	—		—		1	0	115	19
