= Alessio Murgia =

Italian footballer (born 1997)

Personal information
- Date of birth: 1 June 1997 (age 29)
- Place of birth: San Gavino Monreale, Italy
- Height: 1.66 m (5 ft 5 1/2 in)
- Position: Midfielder

Team information
- Current team: Licata
- Number: 8

Youth career
- Circolo Santa Teresa
- Monreale
- –2014: Cagliari

Senior career*
Years	Team	Apps	(Gls)
2014–2018	Cagliari	0	(0)
2014–2016	→ Budoni (loan)	6	(0)
2016–2018	→ Olbia (loan)	41	(0)
2018–2020	Budoni	55	(3)
2020–2021	Sanremese	29	(1)
2021–2022	Carbonia	33	(4)
2022–2023	Aprilia	34	(5)
2023–	Licata	17	(1)
- * Club domestic league appearances and goals as of 20 December 2023

Alessio Murgia (born 1 June 1997) is an Italian football player who plays for Serie D club Licata.

== Club career ==
He made his Serie C debut for Olbia on 27 August 2016 in a game against Renate.
