= SS Racing Club Fondi =

Italian football club

Racing Fondi
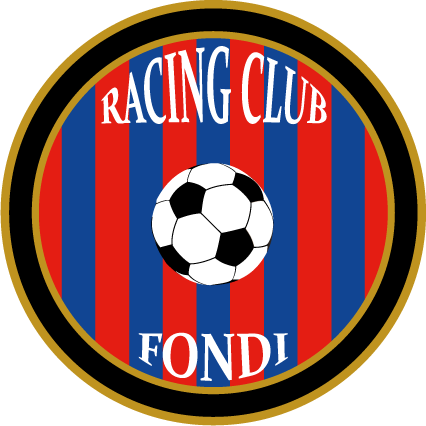
- Full name: S.S. Racing Club Fondi
- Founded: 1922
- Dissolved: 2018
- Ground: Stadio Domenico Purificato
- Capacity: 3,022
- Chairman: Antonio Pezone
- League: N/A
- 2017–18: Serie C Group C, 18th
- Website: http://www.racingfondi.it
Home colours	Away colours

S.S. Racing Club Fondi was an Italian football club, based in Fondi, Lazio. The club previously known as Unicusano Fondi and Fondi Calcio. In 2018, the club merged with F.C. Aprilia.

== History ==
Former logo.

On 15 August 1922 Associazione Sportiva Fondana was founded by engineer Boriello, director of the railway station in the town, who gave birth to this new partnership, mixing all the football fans of Lazio town and bringing them together in a single sport project. Then, on 16 August of that year, the next day, Fondi played its first official game at the old municipal stadium against Lenola, in which it was defeated with score 0–2. The squad was: Calves, Santella, L . Vitelli, Santella, L. Forte, Purificato, D'Alessandro, R. Forte, Amante, Velletri, Fiorillo, Ferrazzoli, Magnarella and Boriello on the bench.

On 1 October 1923 the new company elected Luigi Forte as president, Ottorino Fabiani as secretary and Erasmo Di Russo as cashier.

The colors of the team, initially, were red and blue, then in the championship of Promozione in 1952–1953 season, when the club took the name as Unione Sportiva Fondana, changed to amaranth and sky, but when it relegated to Prima Categoria Lazio in 1960–1961 returned to the original ones.

In 2008, Fondi Calcio was incorporated as a s.s.d. a r.l.

In the 2009–2010 season in Serie D reached the first historic promotion to the professional championship of Lega Pro Seconda Divisione with a day in advance after drawing at home 2–2 against Boville Ernica in front of nearly 2,000 spectators. So it finished first in the Group G of Serie D and was promoted to Lega Pro Seconda Divisione.

The last two seasons in Lega Pro Seconda Divisione Fondi retained its spot in the category.

In October 2014, the team was purchased by Università degli Studi Niccolò Cusano.

In 2017, chairman of S.S. Racing Club Roma, Antonio Pezone, bought the Fondi Calcio, renaming into S.S. Racing Club Fondi.

In May 2018, Fondi was relegated to Serie D after a 4–3 loss to Paganese Calcio 1926 in the Serie C Group C relegation play out.

== Chairmen ==
- Stefano Ranucci (2014–2017)
- Antonio Pezone (2017–2018)

== Colors ==
The team's colors are red and blue.

== Honors ==
- Coppa Italia Serie D
  - Champions: 2015–16
