= List of Italian football transfers summer 2018 =

This is a list of Italian football transfers from the summer of 2018 that featured at least one Serie A or Serie B club. The transfer window of Serie A was opened from 1 July to 17 August 2018, despite some contracts which were already signed before the window. Moreover, the international incoming transfer window stayed open from 1 July until 25 August. Free agents could join any club at any time.

== Transfers ==
Legend

- Those clubs in Italic indicate that the player already left the team on loan on this or the previous season or new signing that immediately left the club

=== February–May ===
Date	Name	Moving from	Moving to	Fee
5 February 2018	(Venezuela) Tomás Rincón	Juventus	Torino	€6M (Note: The player already played for his new club in 2017–18 season, the deal turned from temporary to definitive.)
7 February 2018	(Brazil) Felipe Vizeu	(Brazil) Flamengo	Udinese	Undisclosed
10 April 2018	Michael Fabbro	Bassano	Chievo	Free
23 May 2018	(Netherlands) Mitchell Dijks	(Netherlands) Ajax	Bologna	Free
23 May 2018	(Slovenia) Rok Vodišek	(Slovenia) Olimpija Ljubljana	Genoa	Free
24 May 2018	(France) Geoffrey Kondogbia	Inter	(Spain) Valencia	Undisclosed
28 May 2018	(Poland) Mariusz Stępiński	(France) Nantes	Chievo	Undisclosed
28 May 2018	(Croatia) Ante Ćorić	(Croatia) Dinamo Zagreb	Roma	€6M
30 May 2018	(Argentina) Germán Pezzella	(Spain) Real Betis	Fiorentina	Undisclosed
30 May 2018	(Latvia) Aleksejs Saveļjevs	(Latvia) Svyturys	Verona	Undisclosed
31 May 2018	(Netherlands) Thom Haye	(Netherlands) Willem II	Lecce	Undisclosed
31 May 2018	(Spain) Iván Marcano	(Portugal) Porto	Roma	Undisclosed

=== June ===
Date	Name	Moving from	Moving to	Fee
4 June 2018 (Note: Effective on 1 July 2018)	Domenico Criscito	(Russia) Zenit Saint Petersburg	Genoa	Free
5 June 2018	(Switzerland) Stephan Lichtsteiner	Juventus	(England) Arsenal	Free
5 June 2018	(Poland) Arkadiusz Reca	(Poland) Wisła Płock	Atalanta	Undisclosed
5 June 2018	(France) Lorenzo Callegari	(France) Paris Saint-Germain	Genoa	Free
7 June 2018	(Brazil) Douglas Costa	(Germany) Bayern Munich	Juventus	€40M
7 June 2018	Tino Parisi	Siracusa	Livorno	Undisclosed
7 June 2018	Fabio Borini	(England) Sunderland	Milan	Undisclosed
8 June 2018	Bryan Cristante	Atalanta	Roma	Loan, €5M
8 June 2018	Mattia Perin	Genoa	Juventus	€12+3M
8 June 2018	(Poland) Krzysztof Piątek	(Poland) Cracovia	Genoa	Undisclosed
8 June 2018	(Serbia) Ivan Lakićević	(Serbia) Vojvodina	Genoa	Free
9 June 2018	Pierluigi Gollini	(England) Aston Villa	Atalanta	Undisclosed
11 June 2018	Simone Verdi	Bologna	Napoli	Undisclosed
11 June 2018	(Brazil) Ryder Matos	Udinese	Verona	Loan
13 June 2018	(Bosnia and Herzegovina) Riad Bajić	Udinese	(Turkey) İstanbul Başakşehir	Loan
13 June 2018	(Serbia) Filip Đorđević	Lazio	Chievo	Free
13 June 2018	Alex Ferrari	Bologna	Sampdoria	Loan
14 June 2018	(Slovakia) Dávid Hancko	(Slovakia) Žilina	Fiorentina	Undisclosed
14 June 2018	(Serbia) Strahinja Tanasijević	Rad	Chievo	Undisclosed
14 June 2018	(Belgium) Samuel Bastien	Chievo	(Belgium) Standard Liège	Undisclosed
14 June 2018	(Brazil) Carlao	Torino	(Cyprus) APOEL	Loan
15 June 2018	(Netherlands) Hidde ter Avest	(Netherlands) Twente	Udinese	Free
15 June 2018	Andrea Favilli	Ascoli	Juventus	€7,5M
15 June 2018	(Croatia) Božo Mikulić	Sampdoria	(Croatia) Hajduk	Undisclosed
15 June 2018	(Serbia) Nenad Tomović	Fiorentina	Chievo	Undisclosed
15 June 2018	(Spain) Christian Montiel Rodrìguez	(Spain) Mallorca	Fiorentina	Free
16 June 2018	(Scotland) Harvey St Clair	(England) Chelsea	Venezia	Free
16 June 2018	(France) Christian Loic Koffi	(France) Monaco	Fiorentina	Free
18 June 2018	(Algeria) Mohamed Fares	Verona	S.P.A.L.	Loan
18 June 2018	(Guinea) Karamoko Cissé	Bari	Verona	Undisclosed
18 June 2018	Federico Viviani	Verona	S.P.A.L.	Undisclosed
18 June 2018	(Switzerland) Nicky Medja	(Switzerland) Sion	Fiorentina	Free
19 June 2018	Paolo Frascatore	Südtirol	Carpi	Undisclosed
19 June 2018	Giammario Piscitella	Roma	Carpi	Undisclosed
19 June 2018	Michele Vano	Arzachena	Carpi	Undisclosed
19 June 2018	(Libya) Ahmad Benali	Pescara	Crotone	€1,5M
19 June 2018	(Germany) Oliver Kragl	Crotone	Foggia	Undisclosed
19 June 2018	(Slovenia) Vid Belec	Benevento	Sampdoria	Undisclosed
19 June 2018	(The Gambia) Omar Colley	(Belgium) Genk	Sampdoria	Undisclosed
19 June 2018	(Ghana) Raman Chibsah	Benevento	Frosinone	Undisclosed
20 June 2018	Davide Riccardi	Verona	Lecce	Undisclosed
20 June 2018	(Senegal) Alfred Gomis	Torino	S.P.A.L.	Undisclosed
20 June 2018	Alberto Paloschi	Atalanta	S.P.A.L.	Undisclosed
20 June 2018	(Slovenia) Jasmin Kurtić	Atalanta	S.P.A.L.	Undisclosed
20 June 2018	(Poland) Bartosz Salamon	Cagliari	S.P.A.L.	Undisclosed
20 June 2018	(Slovenia) Luka Krajnc	Cagliari	Frosinone	Undisclosed
21 June 2018	Arturo Calabresi	Roma	Bologna	Undisclosed
21 June 2018	Gianluca Frabotta	Bologna	Renate	Loan
21 June 2018	Emiliano Pattarello	Bologna	Renate	Loan
21 June 2018	(Paraguay) Federico Santander	(Denmark) Copenhagen	Bologna	€6M
22 June 2018	(Serbia) Filip Đuričić	Sampdoria	Sassuolo	Free
22 June 2018	Antonio Mirante	Bologna	Roma	€4M
22 June 2018	(Poland) Łukasz Skorupski	Roma	Bologna	€9+0,5M
22 June 2018	(Denmark) Riza Durmisi	(Spain) Real Betis	Lazio	Undisclosed
22 June 2018	(Netherlands) Justin Kluivert	(Netherlands) Ajax	Roma	€17,25+1,5M
22 June 2018	Emiliano Viviano	Sampdoria	(Portugal) Sporting CP	Free
22 June 2018	(Croatia) Darijo Srna	(Ukraine) Shakhtar Donetsk	Cagliari	Free
22 June 2018	Marco Tumminello	Roma	Atalanta	€5M
26 June 2018	(Belgium) Radja Nainggolan	Roma	Inter	Undisclosed
26 June 2018	Davide Santon	Inter	Roma	€9,5M
26 June 2018	Nicolò Zaniolo	Inter	Roma	€4,5M
26 June 2018	(Argentina) Javier Pastore	(France) Paris Saint-Germain	Roma	€24,7M
27 June 2018	Leonardo Sernicola	Ternana	Sassuolo	Undisclosed
27 June 2018	(Portugal) João Cancelo	(Spain) Valencia	Juventus	€40,4M
28 June 2018	Lorenzo Dickmann	Novara	S.P.A.L.	Loan
28 June 2018	(Belgium) Aron Katuma	Novara	S.P.A.L.	Undisclosed
28 June 2018	Stefano Pettinari	Pescara	Lecce	Undisclosed
28 June 2018	(Colombia) Damir Ceter	Cagliari	Olbia	Loan
28 June 2018	Alberto Almici	Atalanta	Verona	Loan
28 June 2018	(Belgium) Senna Miangue	Cagliari	(Belgium) Standard Liège	2-year loan
28 June 2018	(Belgium) William Bianda	(France) Lens	Roma	€6+5M
29 June 2018	Michele Somma	Brescia	Bari	Undisclosed
29 June 2018	Alessandro Turrin	Atalanta	Virtus Francavilla	Loan
29 June 2018	Stefano Sabelli	Bari	Brescia	Undisclosed
29 June 2018	Davide Bettella	Inter	Atalanta	Undisclosed
29 June 2018	(Romania) Ionuț Radu	Inter	Genoa	Loan
29 June 2018	Federico Valietti	Inter	Genoa	Undisclosed
29 June 2018	Mattia Sprocati	Salernitana	Lazio	Undisclosed
29 June 2018	(Uruguay) Mauricio Lemos	(Spain) Las Palmas	Sassuolo	Loan
30 June 2018	Simone Aresti	Olbia	Cagliari	Undisclosed
30 June 2018	(Ghana) Joseph Tetteh	Cagliari	Olbia	Undisclosed
30 June 2018	(Slovenia) Leo Štulac	Venezia	Parma	Undisclosed
30 June 2018	Stefano Ciavattini	Roma	Reggina	Undisclosed
30 June 2018	Marco Carraro	Inter	Atalanta	Undisclosed
30 June 2018	(Japan) Yuto Nagatomo	Inter	(Turkey) Galatasaray	Undisclosed
30 June 2018	(Albania) Rey Manaj	Inter	(Spain) Albacete	Loan
30 June 2018	(Argentina) Lucas Castro	Chievo	Cagliari	Undisclosed
30 June 2018	(Denmark) Jens Odgaard	Inter	Sassuolo	Undisclosed
30 June 2018	Matteo Politano	Sassuolo	Inter	Loan

=== July ===
Date	Name	Moving from	Moving to	Fee
1 July 2018	Nicola Falasco	Roma	Avellino	Undisclosed
1 July 2018	Riccardo Improta	Genoa	Benevento	Undisclosed
1 July 2018	Nicola Bellomo	Sambenedettese	Salernitana	Free
2 July 2018	Giangiacomo Magnani	Perugia	Juventus	Undisclosed
2 July 2018	Michele Castagnetti	S.P.A.L.	Cremonese	Undisclosed
2 July 2018	Guido Variola	Udinese	Rimini	Free
2 July 2018	(Spain) Pepe Reina	Napoli	Milan	Free
2 July 2018	(Croatia) Ivan Strinić	Sampdoria	Milan	Free
2 July 2018	(Algeria) Idir Boutrif	(Belgium) Standard Liège	Sampdoria	Undisclosed
2 July 2018	(Ghana) Kwadwo Asamoah	Juventus	Inter	Free
2 July 2018	(Netherlands) Stefan de Vrij	Lazio	Inter	Free
2 July 2018	(France) Alban Lafont	(France) Toulouse	Fiorentina	Undisclosed
2 July 2018	Filippo Sgarbi	Inter	Perugia	Loan
2 July 2018	Marco Varnier	Cittadella	Atalanta	Loan
2 July 2018	Daniele Capelli	Spezia	Padova	Undisclosed
2 July 2018	Federico Marchetti	Lazio	Genoa	Free
2 July 2018	(Poland) Michał Marcjanik	(Poland) Arka Gdynia	Empoli	Undisclosed
3 July 2018	Adam Masina	Bologna	(England) Watford	Undisclosed
3 July 2018	(Spain) Mamadou Tounkara	Lazio	(Switzerland) Schaffhausen	Loan
3 July 2018	Luca Maniero	Palermo	Cittadella	Loan
3 July 2018	Mattia Minesso	Bassano	Padova	Free
3 July 2018	Simone Perilli	Pordenone	Perugia	Loan
3 July 2018	Pietro Ceccaroni	Spezia	Padova	Loan
3 July 2018	(Kosovo) Valon Berisha	(Austria) Red Bull Salzburg	Lazio	Undisclosed
3 July 2018	(Slovakia) Samuel Mráz	(Slovakia) Žilina	Empoli	Undisclosed
3 July 2018	(Netherlands) Dennis van der Heijden	(Netherlands) Almere	Carpi	Free
3 July 2018	Alessandro Tuia	Salernitana	Benevento	Free
3 July 2018	(Brazil) Sandro	(Turkey) Antalyaspor	Benevento	Undisclosed
3 July 2018	(Brazil) Sandro	Benevento	Genoa	Undisclosed
3 July 2018	Andrea Petrucci	Fermana	Carpi	Undisclosed
3 July 2018	Mirko Drudi	Trapani	Cittadella	Undisclosed
3 July 2018	Domenico Frare	Pontedera	Cittadella	Undisclosed
3 July 2018	(Greece) Marios Oikonomou	Bologna	(Greece) AEK Athens	Loan
4 July 2018	Salvatore Molinaro	Palmese	Avellino	Free
4 July 2018	Filippo Falco	Bologna	Lecce	Undisclosed
4 July 2018	Michele Di Gregorio	Inter	Avellino	Loan
4 July 2018	(Guinea) Mohamed Soumarè	Avellino	(Luxembourg) Dudelange	Undisclosed
4 July 2018	(Argentina) Lautaro Martínez	(Argentina) Racing	Inter	Undisclosed
4 July 2018	Federico Di Francesco	Bologna	Sassuolo	Undisclosed
4 July 2018	Diego Falcinelli	Sassuolo	Bologna	Undisclosed
4 July 2018	Domenico Frare	Pontedera	Cittadella	Undisclosed
4 July 2018	Emanuele Giaccherini	Napoli	Chievo	Undisclosed
4 July 2018	Armando Izzo	Genoa	Torino	Undisclosed
4 July 2018	(Belgium) Silvio Proto	(Greece) Olympiacos	Lazio	Free
4 July 2018	(Cameroon) Pa Konate	(France) Lyon	Torino	Undisclosed
4 July 2018	(Germany) Max Barnofsky	(Germany) Hallescher FC	Carpi	Free
5 July 2018	(Switzerland) Jonathan Rossini	Sassuolo	Albissola	Undisclosed
5 July 2018	Samuele Longo	Inter	(Spain) Huesca	Loan
5 July 2018	Andrea Bussaglia	Santarcangelo	Cittadella	Undisclosed
5 July 2018	(Sweden) Mattias Svanberg	(Sweden) Malmö	Bologna	Undisclosed
5 July 2018	(Uruguay) Leandro Cabrera	Crotone	(Spain) Getafe	Undisclosed
5 July 2018	(Ghana) Kevin-Prince Boateng	(Germany) Eintracht Frankfurt	Sassuolo	Free
5 July 2018	(Nigeria) Theophilus Awua	Spezia	Rende	Loan
5 July 2018	(Belgium) Daouda Peeters	(Belgium) Club Brugge	Sampdoria	Undisclosed
5 July 2018	(Denmark) Jacob Rasmussen	(Denmark) Rosenborg	Empoli	Undisclosed
5 July 2018	Andrea Boffelli	Atalanta	Pro Patria	Loan
5 July 2018	Christian Mora	Atalanta	Pro Patria	Loan
6 July 2018	Alberto Alari	Atalanta	Carrarese	Loan
6 July 2018	Nicolò Casale	Verona	Südtirol	Loan
6 July 2018	(Romania) Deian Boldor	Bologna	Verona	Undisclosed
6 July 2018	(Portugal) Alex	Salernitana	(Portugal) Vitória	Loan
6 July 2018	Antonio Palumbo	Sampdoria	Salernitana	Loan
6 July 2018	Luca Castiglia	Pro Vercelli	Salernitana	Undisclosed
6 July 2018	Emilio Volpicelli	Virtus Francavilla	Salernitana	Free
6 July 2018	Andrea Mazzarani	Unattached	Salernitana	Free
6 July 2018	Mattia Valoti	Verona	S.P.A.L.	Loan
6 July 2018	Andrea Palazzi	Inter	Pescara	Loan
6 July 2018	Simone Branca	(Denmark) Vejle Boldklub	Cittadella	Free
6 July 2018	Matteo Di Piazza	Foggia	Cosenza	Undisclosed
6 July 2018	Pier Graziano Gori	Venezia	Benevento	Free
6 July 2018	Antonio Nocerino	Unattached	Benevento	Free
6 July 2018	Christian Maggio	Napoli	Benevento	Free
6 July 2018	Marco Sportiello	Atalanta	Frosinone	Loan
6 July 2018	Antonino La Gumina	Palermo	Empoli	Undisclosed
6 July 2018	Marco Moscati	Novara	Perugia	Undisclosed
6 July 2018	(Senegal) Mouhamadou Sarr	Bologna	Carrarese	Loan
6 July 2018	(Serbia) Vanja Milinković-Savić	Torino	S.P.A.L.	Loan
6 July 2018	Alex Meret	Udinese	Napoli	Undisclosed
6 July 2018	(Greece) Orestis Karnezis	Udinese	Napoli	Undisclosed
6 July 2018	(Spain) Fabián Ruiz	(Spain) Real Betis	Napoli	Undisclosed
6 July 2018	Francesco Golfo	Pianese	Parma	Free
6 July 2018	Emmanuele Matino	Nocerina	Parma	Free
6 July 2018	Lorenzo Adorni	Parma	Monza	Loan
6 July 2018	Luca Mazzitelli	Sassuolo	Genoa	Loan
6 July 2018	(Czech Republic) Jakub Jankto	Udinese	Sampdoria	Loan
6 July 2018	Mauro Coppolaro	Udinese	Venezia	Loan
7 July 2018	(Sweden) Samuel Gustafson	Torino	Verona	Loan
7 July 2018	Alberto Tentardini	Padova	Monza	Undisclosed
7 July 2018	Daniele Celiento	Viterbese	Pescara	Undisclosed
7 July 2018	Alessandro Celli	Fidelis Andria	Pescara	Undisclosed
7 July 2018	(Equatorial Guinea) Jose Machín	Roma	Pescara	Undisclosed
7 July 2018	(Croatia) Josip Posavec	Palermo	(Croatia) Hajduk	Loan
7 July 2018	(Croatia) Alen Halilović	(Germany) Hamburger SV	Milan	Free
7 July 2018	Jacopo Segre	Torino	Venezia	Loan
8 July 2018	(Guinea-Bissau) Zé Turbo	Inter	(Argentina) Newell's Old Boys	Undisclosed
9 July 2018	Simone Palombi	Lazio	Lecce	Loan
9 July 2018	Cristian Cauz	Real Forte Querceta	Parma	Undisclosed
9 July 2018	Cristian Cauz	Parma	Piacenza	Loan
9 July 2018	Alessio Donnarumma	Benevento	Vibonese	Loan
9 July 2018	(Albania) Ledian Memushaj	Benevento	Pescara	Undisclosed
9 July 2018	(Serbia) David Milinković	Genoa	(England) Hull City	Undisclosed
9 July 2018	(Brazil) João Schmidt	Atalanta	(Portugal) Rio Ave	Loan
9 July 2018	Lorenzo Migliorelli	Atalanta	Venezia	2-year loan
9 July 2018	Pasquale Mazzocchi	Parma	Perugia	Undisclosed
9 July 2018	Luigi Sepe	Napoli	Parma	Loan
9 July 2018	Stefano Scappini	Cremonese	Cittadella	Free
9 July 2018	(Brazil) Daniel Fuzato	(Brazil) Palmeiras	Roma	Undisclosed
9 July 2018	Daniele Altobelli	Pro Vercelli	Salernitana	Free
9 July 2018	Cosimo Chiricò	Cesena	Lecce	Free
9 July 2018	Giuseppe Torromino	Unattached	Lecce	Free
9 July 2018	Alessandro Confente	Chievo	Reggina	Loan
9 July 2018	Cesare Pogliano	Chievo	Reggina	Loan
9 July 2018	Giacomo Vrioni	Sampdoria	Venezia	Loan
10 July 2018	(France) Soualiho Meïté	Monaco	Torino	Undisclosed
10 July 2018	Antonio Barreca	Torino	Monaco	Undisclosed
10 July 2018	(Portugal) Cristiano Ronaldo	(Spain) Real Madrid	Juventus	€112M
10 July 2018	Giacomo Piccardo	Sampdoria	Albissola	Loan
10 July 2018	Samuele Perisan	Udinese	Padova	Loan
10 July 2018	Tommaso Brignoli	Inter	Monza	Loan
10 July 2018	Marco Crocchianti	Spezia	Südtirol	Loan
10 July 2018	Stefano Antezza	Spezia	Südtirol	Loan
10 July 2018	Nicholas Pierini	Sassuolo	Spezia	Loan
10 July 2018	(Croatia) Martin Erlic	Sassuolo	Spezia	Loan
10 July 2018	(Canada) Joakim Milli	Casarano	Lecce	Free
10 July 2018	(Uruguay) Lucas Torreira	Sampdoria	(England) Arsenal	Undisclosed
10 July 2018	Alessandro Piu	Empoli	Carpi	Loan
10 July 2018	Lorenzo Crisetig	Bologna	Frosinone	Loan
10 July 2018	(Brazil) Gleison Bremer	(Brazil) Atlético Mineiro	Torino	Loan
10 July 2018	Edoardo Sbampato	Chievo	Alessandria	Loan
10 July 2018	Fabrizio Danese	Chievo	Arezzo	Undisclosed
10 July 2018	Andrea Magrini	Chievo	Pontedera	Loan
10 July 2018	Lorenzo Sarini	Chievo	Imolese	Loan
10 July 2018	Luca Miracoli	Sambenedettese	Brescia	Free
10 July 2018	Ivan Rondanini	Siena	Brescia	Free
10 July 2018	Enrico Alfonso	Cittadella	Brescia	Free
10 July 2018	(Nigeria) Umar Sadiq	Roma	(Scotland) Rangers	Loan
11 July 2018	Filippo Oliana	Sampdoria	Albissola	Loan
11 July 2018	Alex Cossalter	Feltre	Bologna	Undisclosed
11 July 2018	Francesco Acerbi	Sassuolo	Lazio	Undisclosed
11 July 2018	Marco Pissardo	Inter	Monopoli	Loan
11 July 2018	Manuel Lombardoni	Inter	Pro Patria	Loan
11 July 2018	(Argentina) Juan Musso	(Argentina) Racing	Udinese	Undisclosed
11 July 2018	Federico Melchiorri	Cagliari	Perugia	Undisclosed
11 July 2018	Leonardo Morosini	Genoa	Brescia	Undisclosed
12 July 2018	(Colombia) Duván Zapata	Sampdoria	Atalanta	2-year loan
12 July 2018	(Switzerland) Silvan Widmer	Udinese	(Switzerland) Basel	€4,5M
12 July 2018	(Czech Republic) Aleš Matějů	(England) Brighton	Brescia	Loan
12 July 2018	Andrea Caracciolo	Brescia	FeralpiSalò	Free
12 July 2018	Marco Marozzi	Fiorentina	Fermana	Loan
12 July 2018	Doudou Mangni	Atalanta	Monopoli	Undisclosed
12 July 2018	(Portugal) Bruno Alves	(Scotland) Rangers	Parma	Free
12 July 2018	Mattia Bonetto	Inter	Reggina	Undisclosed
12 July 2018	Antonio Mazzotta	Pescara	Palermo	Free
12 July 2018	Jacopo Giuliani	Spezia	Pontedera	Loan
12 July 2018	Eugenio Lamanna	Genoa	Spezia	Undisclosed
12 July 2018	Simone Ciancio	Lecce	Catania	Undisclosed
12 July 2018	Antonio Rosati	Perugia	Torino	Free
12 July 2018	Nicola Danieli	Chievo	Virtus Verona	Loan
12 July 2018	(Senegal) Ansoumana Sané	Chievo	Pro Patria	Loan
12 July 2018	Alberto Cerri	Juventusi	Cagliari	Loan
12 July 2018	Marco Marozzi	Fiorentina	Fermana	Loan
13 July 2018	Alberto Corasaniti	Cittadella	Feltre	Loan
13 July 2018	(Albania) Armand Rada	Inter	Renate	Undisclosed
13 July 2018	Eder	Inter	(China) Jiangsu Suning	Undisclosed
13 July 2018	Laurens Serpe	Genoa	Inter	Loan
13 July 2018	Federico Ceccherini	Crotone	Fiorentina	Undisclosed
13 July 2018	Michele Cerofolini	Fiorentina	Cosenza	Loan
13 July 2018	Luca Mosti	Fiorentina	Arezzo	Loan
13 July 2018	Alessandro Diamanti	Perugia	Livorno	Free
13 July 2018	Davide Agazzi	Atalanta	Livorno	Loan
13 July 2018	Matteo Di Gennaro	Renate	Livorno	Undisclosed
13 July 2018	Michele Rocca	Sampdoria	Livorno	2-year loan
13 July 2018	(Ghana) Nicholas Opoku	(Tunisia) Club Africain	Udinese	Undisclosed
13 July 2018	Paolo Bartolomei	Cittadella	Spezia	Undisclosed
13 July 2018	Federico Proia	Spezia	Cittadella	Undisclosed
13 July 2018	(Croatia) Luka Dumančić	Albalonga	Lecce	Free
13 July 2018	(Spain) Ibourahima Baldé	Sampdoria	Vis Pesaro	Loan
13 July 2018	(North Korea) Choe Song-hyok	Perugia	Arezzo	Undisclosed
13 July 2018	Davide Merelli	Atalanta	Padova	Undisclosed
13 July 2018	Eyob Zambataro	Atalanta	Padova	Loan
13 July 2018	(Croatia) Anton Krešić	Atalanta	Cremonese	Loan
13 July 2018	(Ivory Coast) Christian Kouamé	Cittadella	Genoa	Undisclosed
13 July 2018	Alfredo Donnarumma	Empoli	Brescia	Undisclosed
13 July 2018	Giuseppe Picchi	Empoli	Cremonese	Loan
13 July 2018	Alberto Panico	Genoa	Cittadella	Undisclosed
13 July 2018	Manuel Marras	Trapani	Pescara	Undisclosed
13 July 2018	Lorenzo Montipò	Novara	Benevento	Loan
13 July 2018	(Colombia) Andrés Tello	Juventus	Benevento	Undisclosed
13 July 2018	Michele Troiani	Chievo	Piacenza	Loan
13 July 2018	Alessandro Lombardi	Juventus	Cagliari	Undisclosed
13 July 2018	Alessandro Capello	Cagliari	Padova	Loan
13 July 2018	Federico Ceccherini	Crotone	Fiorentina	Undisclosed
13 July 2018	Nicola Lancini	Brescia	Virtus Verona	Undisclosed
14 July 2018	Jorginho	Napoli	(England) Chelsea	Undisclosed
14 July 2018	Alessandro Bastoni	Atalanta	Inter	Loan return
14 July 2018	Massimo Gobbi	Chievo	Parma	Free
14 July 2018	Mattia Persano	Lecce	Arezzo	Loan
14 July 2018	Federico Bonazzoli	Sampdoria	Padova	Loan
14 July 2018	(Portugal) Aníbal Capela	Carpi	Cosenza	Undisclosed
14 July 2018	Simone Pinna	Cagliari	Olbia	Loan
14 July 2018	Andrea Vassallo	Bologna	Catania	Loan
15 July 2018	Edoardo Goldaniga	Sassuolo	Frosinone	Loan
15 July 2018	(Brazil) Felipe Anderson	Lazio	(England) West Ham	Undisclosed
15 July 2018	Carlo Romei	Sampdoria	Vis Pesaro	Loan
15 July 2018	Alessandro Gabbani	Sampdoria	Vis Pesaro	Loan
15 July 2018	(Spain) Álex Pastor	Sampdoria	Vis Pesaro	Loan
16 July 2018	Dario Dainelli	Chievo	Livorno	Free
16 July 2018	(Czech Republic) Libor Kozák	Bari	Livorno	Free
16 July 2018	(Argentina) Albano Bizzarri	Unattached	Foggia	Free
16 July 2018	Gabriele Gori	Fiorentina	Foggia	Loan
16 July 2018	Luca Ranieri	Fiorentina	Foggia	Loan
16 July 2018	Giuseppe Rizzo	Salernitana	Catania	Undisclosed
16 July 2018	(France) Guillaume Gigliotti	Ascoli	Salernitana	Undisclosed
16 July 2018	(Brazil) Júnior Tavares	(Brazil) São Paulo	Sampdoria	Loan
16 July 2018	(Ghana) Amidu Salifu	Fiorentina	Arezzo	Loan
16 July 2018	Pierluigi Pinto	Fiorentina	Arezzo	Loan
16 July 2018	(Argentina) Albano Bizzarri	Udinese	Foggia Calcio	Free
16 July 2018	(Brazil) Bruno Peres	Roma	(Brazil) São Paulo	Loan
16 July 2018	(Brazil) Igor Coronado	Palermo	(United Arab Emirates) Sharjah	Undisclosed
16 July 2018	Giuseppe Rizzo	Salernitana	Catania	Undisclosed
17 July 2018	Eddie Salcedo	Genoa	Inter	Loan
17 July 2018	Samuele Mulattieri	Spezia	Inter	Undisclosed
17 July 2018	Vincenzo Tommasone	Inter	Rieti	Loan
17 July 2018	Davide Costa	Inter	Rieti	Undisclosed
17 July 2018	(France) Axel Mohamed Bakayoko	Inter	(Switzerland) St. Gallen	Loan
17 July 2018	(Argentina) Agustín Vuletich	(Colombia) Rionegro Águilas	Salernitana	Undisclosed
17 July 2018	Antonio Di Nardo	Sampdoria	Vis Pesaro	Loan
17 July 2018	Domenico Cuomo	Sampdoria	Vis Pesaro	Loan
17 July 2018	Luca Calapai	Carpi	Catania	Undisclosed
17 July 2018	Emil Audero	Juventus	Sampdoria	Loan
17 July 2018	(Brazil) Rogério	Juventus	Sassuolo	Loan
17 July 2018	Paolo Ghiglione	Genoa	Frosinone	Loan
17 July 2018	(Uruguay) Kevin Méndez	Roma	(Ukraine) Karpaty Lviv	Undisclosed
17 July 2018	Cristiano Del Grosso	Venezia	Pescara	Free
17 July 2018	Luca Crosta	Cagliari	Olbia	Loan
17 July 2018	Roberto Biancu	Cagliari	Olbia	Loan
17 July 2018	(Argentina) Julian Illanes	Fiorentina	(Argentina) Argentinos Juniors	Loan
17 July 2018	Luca Calapai	Carpi	Catania	Undisclosed
17 July 2018	Luca Tremolada	Virtus Entella	Brescia	Loan
17 July 2018	Mel Taufer	Inter	Arzachena	Undisclosed
17 July 2018	Nicholas Pennington	Cagliari	Olbia	Undisclosed
17 July 2018	Lorenzo Saporetti	Parma	Renate	Loan
17 July 2018	Lorenzo Simonetti	Parma	Renate	Loan
17 July 2018	Michele Nardi	Parma	Siena	Loan
18 July 2018	Marco Calderoni	Novara	Lecce	Undisclosed
18 July 2018	Fabio Eguelfi	Atalanta	Verona	Loan
18 July 2018	Gaetano Monachello	Atalanta	Pescara	Loan
18 July 2018	Andrea Rizzo Pinna	Atalanta	Inter	Loan
18 July 2018	Alessandro Salvi	Cittadella	Palermo	Undisclosed
18 July 2018	Emmanuele Matino	Parma	Potenza	Loan
18 July 2018	Giacomo Ricci	Parma	Carrarese	Loan
18 July 2018	Luca Rigoni	Genoa	Parma	Free
18 July 2018	(Croatia) Stipe Perica	Udinese	Frosinone	Loan
18 July 2018	(Moldova) Vitalie Damașcan	(Moldova) Sheriff	Torino	Undisclosed
18 July 2018	(Venezuela) Darwin Machís	(Spain) Granada	Udinese	Undisclosed
18 July 2018	Filippo Porcari	Cremonese	Piacenza	Undisclosed
18 July 2018	(Montenegro) Stefan Bajic	Cremonese	Pro Piacenza	Undisclosed
18 July 2018	Matteo Cotali	Cagliari	Olbia	Loan
18 July 2018	Mattia Pitzalis	Cagliari	Olbia	Loan
18 July 2018	Antonio Narciso	Foggia	Sicula Leonzio	Undisclosed
18 July 2018	Andrea Cisco	Sassuolo	Padova	Loan
18 July 2018	Luca Ravanelli	Sassuolo	Padova	Loan
18 July 2018	Jérémie Broh	Sassuolo	Padova	Loan
19 July 2018	(Argentina) Ignacio Pussetto	(Argentina) Huracán	Udinese	Undisclosed
19 July 2018	Andrea Petagna	Atalanta	S.P.A.L.	Loan
19 July 2018	(France) Mehdi Bourabia	(Turkey) Konyaspor	Sassuolo	Undisclosed
19 July 2018	(Uruguay) Walter López	Spezia	Ternana	Undisclosed
19 July 2018	Mattia Trovato	Fiorentina	Cosenza	Loan
19 July 2018	Michele Collocolo	Cosenza	Francavilla	Loan
19 July 2018	Michele Cavion	Cremonese	Ascoli	Undisclosed
19 July 2018	(Romania) Vasile Mogos	Ascoli	Cremonese	Undisclosed
19 July 2018	Alessio Milillo	Pescara	Viterbese	Undisclosed
19 July 2018	(Denmark) Christian Nørgaard	(Denmark) Brøndby	Fiorentina	Undisclosed
19 July 2018	Danilo Russo	Venezia	Casertana	Undisclosed
19 July 2018	(Argentina) Ezequiel Ponce	Roma	(Greece) AEK Athens	Loan
19 July 2018	(Brazil) Alisson Becker	Roma	(England) Liverpool	€62,5+10M
19 July 2018	Luca Lezzerini	Avellino	Venezia	Undisclosed
20 July 2018	Federico Mattiello	Atalanta	Bologna	Loan
20 July 2018	Francesco Orlando	Lazio	Salernitana	Undisclosed
20 July 2018	Fabio Lucioni	Benevento	Lecce	Undisclosed
20 July 2018	Lorenzo Tassi	Inter	Arezzo	2-year loan
20 July 2018	Francesco Galuppini	Parma	Ravenna	Loan
20 July 2018	(Argentina) Lucas Boyé	Torino	(Greece) AEK Athens	Loan
20 July 2018	Elio Capradossi	Roma	Spezia	Loan
20 July 2018	Enrico Bearzotti	Verona	Cosenza	Loan
20 July 2018	(Senegal) Moustapha Seck	Roma	(Netherlands) Almere	Loan
20 July 2018	Mirko Antonucci	Roma	Pescara	Loan
20 July 2018	(Brazil) Gerson	Roma	Fiorentina	Loan
20 July 2018	Francesco Posocco	S.P.A.L.	Catanzaro	Undisclosed
20 July 2018	Giuseppe Figliomeni	Foggia	Catanzaro	Undisclosed
20 July 2018	Elio Calderini	Foggia	Sambenedettese	Undisclosed
20 July 2018	(France) Luka Bogdan	Catania	Livorno	Undisclosed
20 July 2018	(Germany) Koray Günter	(Turkey) Galatasaray	Genoa	Free
21 July 2018	Gennaro Tutino	Napoli	Carpi	Loan
21 July 2018	(France) Zinédine Machach	Napoli	Carpi	Loan
21 July 2018	(Switzerland) Johan Djourou	(Turkey) Antalyaspor	S.P.A.L.	Free
21 July 2018	(Honduras) Rigoberto Rivas	Inter	Ternana	Loan
21 July 2018	(Ivory Coast) Jérémie Boga	(England) Chelsea	Sassuolo	Undisclosed
21 July 2018	Giacomo Beretta	Foggia	Ascoli	Undisclosed
21 July 2018	Roberto Insigne	Napoli	Benevento	Loan
22 July 2018	Andrea Tessiore	Sampdoria	Vis Pesaro	Loan
22 July 2018	(Brazil) Rafael Cabral	Napoli	Sampdoria	Free
22 July 2018	Riccardo Brosco	Verona	Ascoli	Undisclosed
22 July 2018	Riccardo Gagno	Brescia	Ternana	Undisclosed
23 July 2018	Marco Carraro	Atalanta	Foggia	Loan
23 July 2018	Matteo Salvi	Atalanta	S.P.A.L.	Loan
23 July 2018	Federico Giraudo	Torino	Ternana	Loan
23 July 2018	Filippo Berardi	Torino	Monopoli	Loan
23 July 2018	Daniele Altobelli	Salernitana	Ternana	Loan
23 July 2018	(Montenegro) Cristian Hadžiosmanović	Sampdoria	Vis Pesaro	Loan
23 July 2018	(Brazil) Leandrinho	Napoli	(Brazil) Atlético Mineiro || Loan	
24 July 2018	Massimo Volta	Perugia	Benevento	Loan
24 July 2018	(Sweden) Robin Olsen	(Denmark) Copenhagen	Roma	Loan
24 July 2018	Luca Palmiero	Napoli	Cosenza	Loan
24 July 2018	Armando Anastasio	Napoli	Cosenza	Loan
24 July 2018	(Belgium) Yordy Gillekens	(Belgium) Leuven	Fiorentina	Loan
24 July 2018	Mattia Finotto	S.P.A.L.	Cittadella	Loan
24 July 2018	Tommaso Farabegoli	Cesena	Sampdoria	Free
25 July 2018	Samuel Di Carmine	Perugia	Verona	Loan
25 July 2018	(Croatia) Mario Pašalić	(England) Chelsea	Atalanta	Loan
25 July 2018	(Ecuador) Bryan Cabezas	Atalanta	(Brazil) Fluminense	Loan
25 July 2018	(Switzerland) Nicolas Haas	Atalanta	Palermo	Loan
25 July 2018	Alberto Brignoli	Juventus	Palermo	Undisclosed
25 July 2018	Danilo Ambro	Palermo	FeralpiSalò	Loan
25 July 2018	Carmine Setola	Palermo	Fano	Loan
25 July 2018	Gianluca Piccoli	Torino	Giana Erminio	Loan
25 July 2018	Antonio D'Alena	Torino	Renate	Loan
25 July 2018	Matteo Rossetti	Torino	Renate	Loan
25 July 2018	Riccardo Marchizza	Sassuolo	Crotone	Loan
25 July 2018	Alessandro Garattoni	Cesena	Crotone	Free
25 July 2018	Alessandro Crescenzi	Pescara	Verona	Undisclosed
25 July 2018	Romano Perticone	Cesena	Salernitana	Free
25 July 2018	Andrea Tiritiello	Fidelis Andria	Cosenza	Undisclosed
25 July 2018	Edoardo Soleri	Roma	(Netherlands) Almere	Loan
25 July 2018	Nicholas Battaiola	Cremonese	Gubbio	Loan
25 July 2018	(Kosovo) Samir Ujkani	Cremonese	(Turkey) Çaykur Rizespor	Undisclosed
25 July 2018	Andrea Petrucci	Carpi	Vis Pesaro	Loan
25 July 2018	Gabriele Moncini	Cesena	S.P.A.L.	Free
25 July 2018	(Ghana) Shaka Mawuli Eklu	S.P.A.L.	Catanzaro	Loan
25 July 2018	(Sweden) Melker Hallberg	Udinese	(Denmark) Vejle Boldklub	Undisclosed
26 July 2018	(France) Eddy Gnahoré	Palermo	(France) Amiens	Loan
26 July 2018	Amato Ciciretti	Napoli	Parma	Loan
26 July 2018	Alessandro Giacomel	Empoli	Virtus Verona	Loan
26 July 2018	Niccolò Giannetti	Cagliari	Livorno	Loan
26 July 2018	(Iceland) Sveinn Aron Guðjohnsen	(Iceland) Breiðablik	Spezia	Undisclosed
26 July 2018	Daniele Celiento	Pescara	Catanzaro	Undisclosed
26 July 2018	Gennaro Scognamiglio	Cesena	Pescara	Free
26 July 2018	(Senegal) Maurice Gomis	S.P.A.L.	Siracusa	Loan
27 July 2018	Andrea Fulignati	Cesena	Empoli	Free
27 July 2018	Luca Vido	Atalanta	Perugia	Loan
27 July 2018	Giangiacomo Magnani	Juventus	Sassuolo	Undisclosed
27 July 2018	(Brazil) Lucas Evangelista	Udinese	(France) Nantes	Undisclosed
27 July 2018	(Venezuela) Andrés Ponce	Sampdoria	(Russia) Anzhi	Undisclosed
27 July 2018	Lorenzo Carissoni	Torino	Carrarese	Loan
27 July 2018	Manuel De Luca	Torino	Alessandria	Loan
27 July 2018	Tommaso Cucchietti	Torino	Alessandria	Loan
27 July 2018	(France) Grégoire Defrel	Roma	Sampdoria	Loan
27 July 2018	Ivan Varone	Ternana	Cosenza	Loan
27 July 2018	Andrea Gemignani	S.P.A.L.	Sambenedettese	Undisclosed
27 July 2018	Filippo Damian	Chievo	Siena	Undisclosed
27 July 2018	(Ghana) Bismark Ngissah	Chievo	Viterbese	Loan
27 July 2018	Francesco Forte	Inter	(Belgium) Waasland-Beveren	Undisclosed
28 July 2018	Rolando Mandragora	Juventus	Udinese	€20M
28 July 2018	(Poland) Tomasz Kupisz	Cesena	Ascoli	Free
28 July 2018	(Greece) Giorgos Antzoulas	(Greece) Asteras Tripolis	Fiorentina	Loan
28 July 2018	(France) Mohamed Bahlouli	(France) Lyon	Sampdoria	Undisclosed
30 July 2018	(Czech Republic) Lukáš Zima	Genoa	Livorno	Loan
30 July 2018	Thomas Saloni	Spezia	Monopoli	Loan
30 July 2018	Giovanni Sbrissa	Sassuolo	Siena	Loan
30 July 2018	Ettore Gliozzi	Sassuolo	Siena	Loan
30 July 2018	Pietro Cianci	Sassuolo	Siena	Loan
31 July 2018	(Tunisia) Karim Laribi	Cesena	Verona	Free
31 July 2018	Leonardo Benedetti	Spezia	Sampdoria	2-year loan
31 July 2018	Matteo Ricci	Roma	Spezia	Undisclosed
31 July 2018	(Serbia) Boris Radunović	Atalanta	Cremonese	Loan
31 July 2018	Dario Del Fabro	Juventus	Cremonese	Loan
31 July 2018	Mauro Vigorito	Frosinone	Lecce	Undisclosed
31 July 2018	(Slovenia) Vitja Valencić	Fiorentina	(Slovenia) Olimpija Ljubljana	Undisclosed
31 July 2018	Leonardo Candellone	Torino	Pordenone	Loan
31 July 2018	Giuseppe Caccavallo	Venezia	Carrarese	Loan
31 July 2018	(Brazil) Nícolas Andrade	Verona	Udinese	Loan
31 July 2018	Gian Filippo Felicioli	Milan	Perugia	Loan
31 July 2018	(Iceland) Emil Hallfreðsson	Udinese	Frosinone	Undisclosed

=== August ===
Date	Name	Moving from	Moving to	Fee
1 August 2018	Gianmarco Vannucchi	Alessandria	Salernitana	Undisclosed
1 August 2018	Roberto Crivello	Frosinone	Spezia	Free
1 August 2018	(Croatia) Milan Badelj	Fiorentina	Lazio	Free
1 August 2018	(Argentina) Joaquín Correa	(Spain) Sevilla	Lazio	Undisclosed
1 August 2018	(Croatia) Šime Vrsaljko	(Spain) Atlético Madrid	Inter	Loan
1 August 2018	(Slovakia) Martin Bukata	(Poland) Piast Gliwice	Benevento	Free
1 August 2018	Youssef Maleh	Cesena	Venezia	Free
1 August 2018	Youssef Maleh	Venezia	Ravenna	Loan
2 August 2018	(Argentina) Gonzalo Higuaín	Juventus	Milan	Loan
2 August 2018	Leonardo Bonucci	Milan	Juventus	€35M
2 August 2018	Mattia Caldara	Juventus	Milan	€35M
2 August 2018	Alessandro Bellemo	S.P.A.L.	Pro Vercelli	Loan
2 August 2018	(Denmark) Oliver Urso	Cesena	Salernitana	Free
2 August 2018	Alessandro Micai	Bari	Salernitana	Free
2 August 2018	Gennaro Tutino	Carpi	Cosenza	Loan
2 August 2018	Filippo Bandinelli	Sassuolo	Benevento	Loan
2 August 2018	Federico Ricci	Sassuolo	Benevento	Loan
2 August 2018	(Brazil) Victor da Silva	Chievo	Fermana	Loan
2 August 2018	(Senegal) Maodo Malick Mbaye	Chievo	Carpi	Loan
2 August 2018	Enrico Brignola	Benevento	Sassuolo	Undisclosed
2 August 2018	(Morocco) Shady Oukhadda	Torino	Albissola	Loan
3 August 2018	(Netherlands) Djavan Anderson	Bari	Lazio	Free
3 August 2018	Andrea Tozzo	Sampdoria	Verona	Loan
3 August 2018	Leonardo Capezzi	Sampdoria	Empoli	Loan
3 August 2018	(England) Ronaldo Vieira	(England) Leeds United	Sampdoria	Undisclosed
3 August 2018	Marco Sala	Inter	Arezzo	2-year loan
3 August 2018	(Serbia) Lazar Nikolić	(Serbia) OFK Beograd	S.P.A.L.	Undisclosed
3 August 2018	Jacopo Petriccione	Bari	Lecce	Free
3 August 2018	(Croatia) Filip Bradarić	(Croatia) HNK Rijeka	Cagliari	Undisclosed
3 August 2018	Emanuele Suagher	Atalanta	Carpi	Loan
3 August 2018	Cristian Galano	Bari	Parma	Free
3 August 2018	(Brazil) Leandro Castán	Roma	(Brazil) Vasco da Gama	Free
3 August 2018	Luca Marrone	Juventus	Verona	Loan
3 August 2018	(Slovenia) Jure Balkovec	Bari	Verona	Free
3 August 2018	(Scotland) Liam Henderson	Bari	Verona	Free
3 August 2018	Antonino Ragusa	Sassuolo	Verona	Loan
3 August 2018	Michelangelo Albertazzi	Unattached	Livorno	Free
4 August 2018	(Belgium) Kevin Mirallas	(England) Everton	Fiorentina	Loan
4 August 2018	(Poland) Paweł Dawidowicz	(Portugal) Benfica B	Verona	Loan
4 August 2018	Francesco Giorno	Parma	Monza	Loan
4 August 2018	Massimiliano Busellato	Bari	Foggia	Free
4 August 2018	(Belgium) Maecky Ngombo	(Netherlands) Roda	Ascoli	Undisclosed
4 August 2018	(Paraguay) Gustavo Gómez	Milan	(Brazil) Palmeiras	Loan
6 August 2018	(Sweden) Pa Konate	S.P.A.L.	(United States) Cincinnati	Loan
6 August 2018	(Slovenia) Damir Bartulovič	Chievo	Albissola	Loan
6 August 2018	(The Gambia) Yusupha Bobb	Chievo	Cuneo	Loan
6 August 2018	(Croatia) Bruno Petković	Bologna	(Croatia) Dinamo Zagreb	Undisclosed
6 August 2018	Fabrizio Brignani	Bologna	Pisa	Loan
6 August 2018	Gabriele Corbo	Spezia	Bologna	Undisclosed
6 August 2018	(Slovakia) Denis Baumgartner	Sampdoria	(Slovakia) Dunajská Streda	Loan
6 August 2018	(Argentina) Matías Silvestre	Sampdoria	Empoli	Undisclosed
6 August 2018	(Guinea-Bissau) Joao Claudio Gomes Ricciulli	Sampdoria	(Portugal) Braga	Loan
6 August 2018	(Spain) Raúl Asencio	Genoa	Benevento	Loan
7 August 2018	Giovanni Di Noia	Bari	Chievo	Free
7 August 2018	Giovanni Di Noia	Chievo	Carpi	Loan
7 August 2018	Luca Crecco	Lazio	Pescara	Undisclosed
7 August 2018	Alberto Acquadro	Venezia	Fano	Undisclosed
7 August 2018	(France) Jonathan Biabiany	Inter	Parma	Undisclosed
7 August 2018	Alessandro Bastoni	Inter	Parma	Loan
7 August 2018	Federico Dimarco	Inter	Parma	Loan
7 August 2018	(Chile) Francisco Sierralta	Udinese	Parma	Loan
7 August 2018	Tommaso Cancellotti	Brescia	Cittadella	Undisclosed
7 August 2018	(Ghana) Patrick Asmah	Atalanta	(Slovakia) Senica	Loan
7 August 2018	(Romania) Vlad Dragomir	(England) Arsenal	Perugia	Free
7 August 2018	(Croatia) Marko Pjaca	Juventus	Fiorentina	Loan
7 August 2018	Alessandro Iacobucci	Virtus Entella	Frosinone	Free
7 August 2018	Luigi Dinielli	Foggia	Matera	Undisclosed
7 August 2018	(Switzerland) Matteo Fedele	Foggia	(Romania) U Craiova	Loan
7 August 2018	(Ivory Coast) Pierre Zebli	(Belgium) Genk	Ascoli	Loan
7 August 2018	(Poland) Paweł Bochniewicz	Udinese	(Poland) Górnik Zabrze	Loan
7 August 2018	(Brazil) Ewandro	Udinese	FK Austria Wien	Loan
7 August 2018	(Albania) Shaqir Tafa	Palermo	Cuneo	Loan
7 August 2018	Davide Borsellini	Udinese	Rende	Undisclosed
7 August 2018	Alex Rolfini	Carpi	Gozzano	Loan
7 August 2018	(Guinea-Bissau) Eduardo Bubacar Baldé	Sampdoria	Empoli	Undisclosed
7 August 2018	(Serbia) Vladimir Golemić	(Switzerland) Lugano	Crotone	Undisclosed
8 August 2018	Luca Rossettini	Genoa	Chievo	Loan
8 August 2018	Francesco Golfo	Parma	Trapani	Loan
8 August 2018	Salvatore Molina	Atalanta	Crotone	Undisclosed
8 August 2018	(Romania) George Pușcaș	Inter	Palermo	Undisclosed
8 August 2018	Daniele Verde	Roma	(Spain) Valladolid	Loan
8 August 2018	(Slovakia) Michal Tomič	Sampdoria	(Slovakia) Žilina	Loan
8 August 2018	(France) Kévin Malcuit	(France) Lille	Napoli	Undisclosed
8 August 2018	(Argentina) Lisandro López	(Portugal) Benfica	Genoa	Loan
9 August 2018	(Croatia) Adrian Šemper	(Croatia) Zagreb	Chievo	Loan
9 August 2018	(United States) Joshua Pérez	Fiorentina	(United States) Los Angeles	Undisclosed
9 August 2018	Marco Frediani	Parma	Ternana	Loan
9 August 2018	Filippo Perucchini	Bologna	Ascoli	Undisclosed
9 August 2018	(Sweden) Emil Krafth	Bologna	(France) Amiens	Loan
9 August 2018	(Croatia) Nikola Kalinić	Milan	(Spain) Atlético Madrid	Undisclosed
9 August 2018	Enrico Pezzi	Cittadella	Carpi	Undisclosed
9 August 2018	Andrea Arrighini	Cittadella	Carpi	Undisclosed
9 August 2018	Giancarlo Malcore	Carpi	Cittadella	Undisclosed
9 August 2018	Francesco Di Tacchio	Avellino	Salernitana	Free
9 August 2018	(Colombia) Carlos Sánchez	Fiorentina	(England) West Ham	Undisclosed
9 August 2018	(Poland) Bartosz Salamon	S.P.A.L.	Frosinone	Loan
9 August 2018	Salvatore D'Elia	Bari	Ascoli	Free
9 August 2018	(Ivory Coast) Moussa Koné	Frosinone	(Turkey) Erzurumspor	Undisclosed
9 August 2018	(Uruguay) Jaime Báez	Fiorentina	Cosenza	Loan
9 August 2018	(Uruguay) Andrés Schetino	Fiorentina	Cosenza	Loan
9 August 2018	(Belgium) Pierre-Yves Ngawa	Avellino	Perugia	Free
9 August 2018	Nicola Falasco	Avellino	Perugia	Free
10 August 2018	Marco Crimi	Virtus Entella	Spezia	Loan
10 August 2018	Axel Campeol	Milan	Sampdoria	Undisclosed
10 August 2018	(Latvia) Edgaras Dubickas	(Latvia) Svyturys	Lecce	Undisclosed
10 August 2018	Andrea Buongiorno	Torino	Carpi	Loan
10 August 2018	Andrea Zaccagno	Torino	Pro Piacenza	Loan
10 August 2018	(Bosnia and Herzegovina) Milan Đurić	(England) Bristol City	Salernitana	Undisclosed
10 August 2018	Filippo Melegoni	Atalanta	Pescara	Loan
10 August 2018	(Guinea) Brem Soumaoro	(Netherlands) Go Ahead Eagles	Livorno	Undisclosed
10 August 2018	Andrea Favilli	Juventus	Genoa	Loan
10 August 2018	(England) Cy Goddard	(England) Tottenham	Benevento	Free
10 August 2018	(Argentina) Marcos Curado	Genoa	Crotone	Loan
10 August 2018	Eric Lanini	Juventus	Imolese	Loan
11 August 2018	(Nigeria) Joel Obi	Torino	Chievo	Undisclosed
11 August 2018	(Portugal) André Silva	Milan	(Spain) Sevilla	Loan
11 August 2018	Riccardo Forte	Milan	Pistoiese	Loan
11 August 2018	Andrés Llamas	Milan	Pistoiese	Loan
11 August 2018	Luca Antonelli	Milan	Empoli	Free
12 August 2018	Stefano Sturaro	Juventus	(Portugal) Sporting CP	Loan
12 August 2018	Kristaps Zommers	Parma	Imolese	Loan
13 August 2018	Pietro Iemmello	Benevento	Foggia	Loan
13 August 2018	Cristian Mutton	Inter	Giana Erminio	Undisclosed
13 August 2018	(Uruguay) César Falletti	Bologna	Palermo	Loan
13 August 2018	(Senegal) Keita Baldé	(France) Monaco	Inter	Loan
13 August 2018	Manuel Locatelli	Milan	Sassuolo	Loan
13 August 2018	Federico Valietti	Genoa	Crotone	Loan
13 August 2018	(Switzerland) Edimilson Fernandes	(England) West Ham	Fiorentina	Loan
14 August 2018	Federico Barba	(Spain) Gijón	Chievo	Undisclosed
14 August 2018	Raffaele Alcibiade	Pro Vercelli	Juventus	Undisclosed
14 August 2018	(Nigeria) Ola Aina	(England) Chelsea	Torino	Loan
14 August 2018	(France) Tiémoué Bakayoko	(England) Chelsea	Milan	Loan
14 August 2018	(Brazil) André Anderson	(Brazil) Santos	Lazio	Undisclosed
14 August 2018	Roberto Inglese	Napoli	Parma	Loan
14 August 2018	Alberto Grassi	Napoli	Parma	Loan
14 August 2018	(Democratic Republic of the Congo) Benjamin Mokulu	Avellino	Carpi	Free
14 August 2018	(The Gambia) Lamin Jallow	Chievo	Salernitana	Loan
14 August 2018	Matteo Arena	Bari	Foggia	Free
14 August 2018	(France) Steven Nzonzi	(Spain) Sevilla	Roma	€26,6+4M
14 August 2018	Michele Cremonesi	S.P.A.L.	Perugia	Loan
14 August 2018	(Slovakia) Norbert Gyömbér	Roma	Perugia	Undisclosed
14 August 2018	(Argentina) Facundo Lescano	Parma	(Netherlands) Telstar	Undisclosed
14 August 2018	(Argentina) Claudio Spinelli	Genoa	Crotone	Loan
15 August 2018	(North Korea) Han Kwang-song	Cagliari	Perugia	Loan
15 August 2018	(Nigeria) Kingsley Michael	Bologna	Perugia	Loan
15 August 2018	(Netherlands) Rai Vloet	(Switzerland) Chiasso	Frosinone	Loan
16 August 2018	(Brazil) Danilo Larangeira	Udinese	Bologna	Loan
16 August 2018	Filippo Pavoni	Chievo	Fermana	Loan
16 August 2018	Fabrizio Caligara	Cagliari	Olbia	Loan
16 August 2018	(Argentina) Santiago Colombatto	Cagliari	Verona	Loan
16 August 2018	(Croatia) Lorenco Šimić	Sampdoria	S.P.A.L.	Loan
16 August 2018	Matteo Ciofani	Frosinone	Pescara	Undisclosed
16 August 2018	Francesco Zampano	Pescara	Frosinone	Loan
16 August 2018	Andrea La Mantia	Virtus Entella	Lecce	Undisclosed
16 August 2018	Salvatore Caturano	Lecce	Virtus Entella	Loan
16 August 2018	Marco Pinato	Venezia	Sassuolo	Undisclosed
16 August 2018	Marco Pinato	Sassuolo	Venezia	Loan
16 August 2018	Davide Frattesi	Sassuolo	Ascoli	Loan
16 August 2018	(Brazil) Marlon Santos	(Spain) Barcelona	Sassuolo	Undisclosed
16 August 2018	Manuel Scavone	Parma	Lecce	Loan
16 August 2018	(Sweden) Albin Ekdal	(Germany) Hamburger SV	Sampdoria	Undisclosed
16 August 2018	Kevin Bonifazi	Torino	S.P.A.L.	Loan
16 August 2018	(France) M'Bala Nzola	Carpi	Trapani	Loan
16 August 2018	Matteo Ardemagni	Avellino	Ascoli	Free
16 August 2018	Giacomo Bindi	Padova	Pordenone	Undisclosed
16 August 2018	(Bulgaria) Petko Hristov	Fiorentina	Ternana	Loan
16 August 2018	(Argentina) Nahuel Valentini	(Spain) Real Oviedo	Ascoli	Free
17 August 2018	(Iraq) Ali Adnan	Udinese	Atalanta	Loan
17 August 2018	(Argentina) Emiliano Rigoni	(Russia) Zenit	Atalanta	Loan
17 August 2018	(Estonia) Ragnar Klavan	(England) Liverpool	Cagliari	€2M
17 August 2018	(Colombia) Jherson Vergara	Milan	Cagliari	Undisclosed
17 August 2018	(Colombia) Jherson Vergara	Cagliari	Olbia	Loan
17 August 2018	(Argentina) Mauro Burruchaga	(Argentina) River Plate	Chievo	Undisclosed
17 August 2018	Luca Rizzo	Bologna	Foggia	Loan
17 August 2018	Marco Capuano	Cagliari	Frosinone	Undisclosed
17 August 2018	Gabriele Morelli	Livorno	Juventus	Loan
17 August 2018	Nicolò Fazzi	Atalanta	Livorno	Loan
17 August 2018	Alessandro Deiola	Cagliari	Parma	Loan
17 August 2018	Mattia Sprocati	Lazio	Parma	Loan
17 August 2018	Christian Capone	Atalanta	Pescara	Loan
17 August 2018	Luca Milesi	Atalanta	Pro Vercelli	Undisclosed
17 August 2018	Marco D'Alessandro	Atalanta	Udinese	Loan
17 August 2018	(Colombia) David Ospina	(England) Arsenal	Napoli	Loan
17 August 2018	(Uruguay) Diego Laxalt	Genoa	Milan	Undisclosed
17 August 2018	Gianluca Lapadula	Milan	Genoa	Undisclosed
17 August 2018	(Colombia) Carlos Bacca	Milan	(Spain) Villarreal	Undisclosed
17 August 2018	(Spain) Samu Castillejo	(Spain) Villarreal	Milan	Undisclosed
17 August 2018	Gabriele Bellodi	Milan	Olbia	Loan
17 August 2018	Giacomo Ferrazzo	Sampdoria	Juve Stabia	Loan
17 August 2018	(Slovakia) Dávid Ivan	Sampdoria	Vis Pesaro	Loan
17 August 2018	Valerio Verre	Sampdoria	Perugia	Loan
17 August 2018	Lorenzo Tonelli	Napoli	Sampdoria	Loan
17 August 2018	Riccardo Saponara	Fiorentina	Sampdoria	Loan
17 August 2018	(Belgium) Xian Emmers	Inter	Cremonese	Loan
17 August 2018	(Algeria) Mouhamed Belkheir	Inter	Brescia	Undisclosed
17 August 2018	Andrea Pinamonti	Inter	Frosinone	Loan
17 August 2018	Roberto Soriano	(Spain) Villarreal	Torino	Loan
17 August 2018	Simone Zaza	(Spain) Valencia	Torino	Loan
17 August 2018	Biagio Meccariello	Brescia	Lecce	Loan
17 August 2018	(Croatia) Luka Dumančić	Lecce	Juve Stabia	Undisclosed
17 August 2018	Mirko Valdifiori	Torino	S.P.A.L.	Undisclosed
17 August 2018	(Ivory Coast) Koffi Djidji	(France) Nantes	Torino	Loan
17 August 2018	Simone Missiroli	Sassuolo	S.P.A.L.	Undisclosed
17 August 2018	(Ghana) Afriyie Acquah	Torino	Empoli	Undisclosed
17 August 2018	(Netherlands) Djavan Anderson	Lazio	Salernitana	Loan
17 August 2018	(Brazil) André Anderson	Lazio	Salernitana	Loan
17 August 2018	Giorgio Spizzichino	Lazio	Cuneo	Loan
17 August 2018	Davide Di Gennaro	Lazio	Salernitana	Loan
17 August 2018	(Brazil) Alan Empereur	Foggia	Verona	Undisclosed
17 August 2018	(Romania) Deian Boldor	Verona	Foggia	Loan
17 August 2018	(Netherlands) Timo Letschert	Sassuolo	(Netherlands) Utrecht	Loan
17 August 2018	Francesco Cassata	Sassuolo	Frosinone	Loan
17 August 2018	Matteo Legittimo	Lecce	Cosenza	Undisclosed
17 August 2018	Lorenzo Venuti	Fiorentina	Lecce	Loan
17 August 2018	Tommaso Fantacci	Empoli	Carpi	Undisclosed
17 August 2018	Emanuele Terranova	Frosinone	Cremonese	Undisclosed
17 August 2018	Emanuele Cicerelli	Salernitana	Foggia	Loan
17 August 2018	Nunzio Di Roberto	Salernitana	Juve Stabia	Undisclosed
17 August 2018	Antonio Zito	Salernitana	Casertana	Undisclosed
17 August 2018	(Costa Rica) Joel Campbell	(England) Arsenal	Frosinone	Undisclosed
17 August 2018	Alexis Ferrante	Brescia	Pescara	Undisclosed
17 August 2018	Luigi Carillo	Genoa	Brescia	Loan
17 August 2018	Simone Romagnoli	Empoli	Brescia	Loan
17 August 2018	(Brazil) Lucas Chiaretti	Cittadella	Foggia	Undisclosed
17 August 2018	Cristian Galano	Parma	Foggia	Loan
17 August 2018	(Finland) Sauli Väisänen	S.P.A.L.	Crotone	Loan
17 August 2018	(Bulgaria) Andrey Galabinov	Genoa	Spezia	Undisclosed
17 August 2018	(Nigeria) William Troost-Ekong	(Turkey) Bursaspor	Udinese	Undisclosed
17 August 2018	Luca Garritano	Chievo	Cosenza	Loan
17 August 2018	(Turkey) Salih Uçan	(Turkey) Fenerbahçe	Empoli	Loan
17 August 2018	Riccardo Baroni	Fiorentina	Virtus Entella	Undisclosed
17 August 2018	(Uruguay) Joaquín Ardaiz	(Switzerland) Chiasso	Frosinone	Loan
17 August 2018	(Ivory Coast) Gervinho	(China) Hebei Fortune	Parma	Free
17 August 2018	(England) Stephy Mavididi	(England) Arsenal	Juventus	Undisclosed
17 August 2018	Cristian Buonaiuto	Perugia	Benevento	Loan
17 August 2018	(Senegal) Mamadou Kanouté	Benevento	Catanzaro	Undisclosed
17 August 2018	Nicola Citro	Frosinone	Venezia	Loan
17 August 2018	(Bulgaria) Antonio Vutov	Udinese	(Bulgaria) Botev Plovdiv	Undisclosed
17 August 2018	(Poland) Łukasz Teodorczyk	(Belgium) Anderlecht	Udinese	Undisclosed
17 August 2018	(France) Samuel Souprayen	Verona	(France) Auxerre	Undisclosed
17 August 2018	(Morocco) Jawad El Yamiq	Genoa	Perugia	Loan
17 August 2018	(Brazil) Gabriel	Milan	Perugia	Free
17 August 2018	Alessandro Bordin	Roma	Perugia	Loan
17 August 2018	Ettore Mendicino	Cosenza	Monopoli	Loan
17 August 2018	Luca Verna	Pisa	Cosenza	Loan
17 August 2018	Riccardo Maniero	Novara	Cosenza	Loan
17 August 2018	Cristian Bunino	Pescara	Juventus	Loan
17 August 2018	Ferdinando Del Sole	Juventus	Pescara	Loan
17 August 2018	Federico Casarini	Novara	Ascoli	Loan
17 August 2018	Maurizio Cosentino	Picerno	Ascoli	Undisclosed
17 August 2018	Danilo Ventola	Ascoli	Genoa	Undisclosed
17 August 2018	(Serbia) Nikola Ninković	Genoa	Ascoli	2-year loan
17 August 2018	(Senegal) Keba Coly	Roma	Ascoli	Loan
17 August 2018	Gianmarco Ingrosso	Pisa	Ascoli	Loan
17 August 2018	Andrea D'Egidio	Ascoli	Pisa	Undisclosed
17 August 2018	Tommaso Bianchi	Ascoli	Novara	Undisclosed
17 August 2018	Alessandro Vogliacco	Juventus	Padova	Loan
17 August 2018	Luca Clemenza	Juventus	Padova	Loan
17 August 2018	(Belgium) Noë Dussenne	Crotone	(Belgium) Mouscron	Undisclosed
18 August 2018	(France) Thomas Heurtaux	Udinese	(Turkey) Ankaragücü	Undisclosed
19 August 2018	Cristian Carletti	Carpi	Gozzano	Loan
20 August 2018	(Morocco) Soufiane Bidaoui	Avellino	Spezia	Free
20 August 2018	Alessandro Mattioli	Inter	Cuneo	Loan
20 August 2018	(France) Maxime Gonalons	Roma	(Spain) Sevilla	Loan
20 August 2018	(Slovakia) Martin Valjent	Chievo	(Spain) Mallorca	Loan
21 August 2018	Niccolò Belloni	Inter	Arezzo	Undisclosed
21 August 2018	Matteo Rover	Inter	Vicenza Virtus	Loan
21 August 2018	(Portugal) Pedro Costa Ferreira	Lecce	Trapani	Loan
21 August 2018	Andrea Isufaj	Chievo	Lucchese	Loan
22 August 2018	(Spain) Miguel Angel Maza	Foggia	Sicula Leonzio	Undisclosed
22 August 2018	Andrea De Falco	Benevento	Vicenza Virtus	Undisclosed
22 August 2018	Salvatore Tazza	Benevento	Paganese	Loan
22 August 2018	(Hungary) Norbert Balogh	Palermo	(Cyprus) APOEL	Loan
22 August 2018	(Uruguay) Felipe Avenatti	Bologna	(Belgium) Kortrijk	Loan
22 August 2018	Emilio Volpicelli	Salernitana	Pro Piacenza	Loan
22 August 2018	Eros De Santis	Roma	Siena	Undisclosed
23 August 2018	Wladimiro Falcone	Sampdoria	Lucchese	Loan
23 August 2018	Giovanni Nuti	Chievo	Gubbio	Loan
23 August 2018	Michael Fabbro	Chievo	Siena	Loan
23 August 2018	Tommaso Pobega	Milan	Ternana	Loan
24 August 2018	Paolo Grillo	Palermo	Pro Vercelli	Undisclosed
24 August 2018	(France) Lorenzo Callegari	Genoa	Ternana	Loan
24 August 2018	Nicola Mosti	Juventus	Imolese	Loan
24 August 2018	Francesco Signori	Venezia	Sambenedettese	Undisclosed
24 August 2018	Andrea Bandini	Inter	Rimini	Loan
24 August 2018	(Ghana) Stephen Danso	Inter	Rimini	Loan
24 August 2018	Michele Di Gregorio	Inter	Novara	Loan
24 August 2018	Davide Cinaglia	Cremonese	Novara	Undisclosed
24 August 2018	Filippo Marricchi	Juventus	Novara	2-year loan
24 August 2018	Alessandro Mallamo	Atalanta	Novara	Loan
24 August 2018	Luca Baldassin	Chievo	Viterbese	Undisclosed
24 August 2018	Luca Germoni	Lazio	Virtus Entella	Undisclosed
24 August 2018	Giuseppe Maimone	Lecce	Monopoli	Loan
25 August 2018	Luca Zanon	Fiorentina	Siena	Loan
25 August 2018	Leonardo Marson	Palermo	Olbia	Undisclosed
26 August 2018	Accursio Bentivegna	Palermo	Carrarese	Undisclosed
26 August 2018	Rosario Maddaloni	Palermo	Rende	Loan
27 August 2018	(Croatia) Karlo Butić	Torino	Ternana	Loan
28 August 2018	(Netherlands) Kevin Strootman	Roma	(France) Olympique de Marseille	€25+3M
30 August 2018	(Belgium) Corentin Fiore	Palermo	Imolese	Loan
30 August 2018	Andrea Romanò	Inter	Cuneo	Loan
30 August 2018	Alessandro Fiordaliso	Torino	Teramo	Loan
31 August 2018	Alessandro Tripaldelli	Sassuolo	(Netherlands) PEC Zwolle	Loan
31 August 2018	Gianluca Scamacca	Sassuolo	(Netherlands) PEC Zwolle	Loan
31 August 2018	(Denmark) Andreas Cornelius	Atalanta	(France) Bordeaux	Loan
31 August 2018	Mattia Aramu	Torino	Siena	Undisclosed
31 August 2018	(Serbia) Adem Ljajić	Torino	(Turkey) Beşiktaş	Loan
31 August 2018	(Senegal) M'Baye Niang	Torino	(France) Rennais	Loan
31 August 2018	(France) Yann Karamoh	Inter	(France) Bordeaux	Loan
31 August 2018	Michele Russo	Padova	Siena	Undisclosed

=== September ===
Date	Name	Moving from	Moving to	Fee
1 September 2018	(Brazil) Raphael Martinho	Ascoli	Virtus Entella	Free
4 September 2018	Lorenzo Laverone	Avellino	Ascoli	Free
5 September 2018	Michele Troiano	Virtus Entella	Ascoli	Free
12 September 2018	Cesare Bovo	Unattached	Lecce	Free
13 September 2018	Matteo Bachini	Juve Stabia	Spezia	Free
