= 2019–20 AC ChievoVerona season =

Chievo
2019–20 season
- President: Luca Campedelli
- Head coach: Michele Marcolini
- Stadium: Stadio Marc'Antonio Bentegodi
- Serie B: 6th
- Coppa Italia: Third round
- Top goalscorer: League: Filip Đorđević (10); All: Filip Đorđević (11)
- Biggest win: Chievo 4–1 Cittadella
- Biggest defeat: Frosinone 2–0 Chievo; Chievo 1–3 Spezia; Spezia 3–1 Chievo
Home colours	Away colours	Third colours

The 2019–20 season was the 91st season in the existence of A.C. ChievoVerona and the club's first season back in the second division of Italian football. In addition to the domestic league, Chievo participated in this season's edition of the Coppa Italia.

== Players ==
=== First-team squad ===
As of 31 January 2020

Note: Flags indicate national team as defined under FIFA eligibility rules; some limited exceptions apply. Players may hold more than one non-FIFA nationality.

No.	Pos.	Nation	Player
1	GK	CRO	Adrian Šemper (on loan from Dinamo Zagreb)
2	DF	ITA	Michele Troiani
3	DF	ITA	Matteo Cotali
4	MF	NGR	Joel Obi
5	DF	SLO	Bostjan Cesar (Vice-captain)
6	MF	ITA	Salvatore Esposito (on loan from SPAL)
7	MF	SVK	Dávid Ivan
8	MF	ITA	Jacopo Segre (on loan from Torino)
11	MF	FRA	Hervin Ongenda
13	DF	ITA	Francesco Renzetti
14	DF	FIN	Sauli Väisänen
15	DF	FRA	Maxime Leverbe
16	MF	ITA	Luca Garritano
17	MF	ITA	Emanuele Giaccherini
18	MF	FRA	Ibrahim Karamoko
19	DF	SLO	Daniel Pavlev
21	DF	FRA	Nicolas Frey

No.	Pos.	Nation	Player
22	GK	ITA	Filippo Pavoni
23	FW	SRB	Filip Đorđević
24	FW	ITA	Riccardo Meggiorini (Captain)
25	FW	ITA	Emanuel Vignato (on loan from Bologna)
26	MF	SWE	Jonathan Morsay
27	FW	COL	Damir Ceter (on loan from Cagliari)
29	FW	ITA	Pietro Rovaglia
32	GK	ITA	Michele Nardi
33	DF	ITA	Michele Rigione
34	DF	MNE	Sergej Grubač
36	MF	ITA	Emanuele Zuelli
37	DF	SWE	Joseph Colley
38	FW	ITA	Andrea Isufaj
39	DF	SUI	Marin Čavar
40	MF	ITA	Giovanni Di Noia
41	DF	ITA	Lorenzo Dickmann (on loan from SPAL)
42	MF	SEN	Malick Mbaye

=== Other players under contract ===
As of 2 September 2019

Note: Flags indicate national team as defined under FIFA eligibility rules; some limited exceptions apply. Players may hold more than one non-FIFA nationality.

No.	Pos.	Nation	Player
—	DF	SEN	Ansoumana Sané

=== On loan ===
As of 31 January 2020

Note: Flags indicate national team as defined under FIFA eligibility rules; some limited exceptions apply. Players may hold more than one non-FIFA nationality.

No.	Pos.	Nation	Player
—	GK	ITA	Andrea Seculin (at Sampdoria until 30 June 2020)
—	GK	ITA	Alessandro Confente (at Robur Siena until 30 June 2020)
—	GK	ITA	Lorenzo Sarini (at Pianese until 30 June 2020)
—	DF	ITA	Federico Barba (at Benevento until 30 June 2020, obligation to buy)
—	DF	ITA	Giovanni Nuti (at San Roque de Lepe until 30 June 2020)
—	DF	SRB	Nenad Tomović (at SPAL until 30 June 2020)
—	DF	SRB	Strahinja Tanasijević (at Paris FC until 30 June 2020)
—	MF	ITA	Nicola Andreoli (at Robur Siena until 30 June 2020)
—	MF	ITA	Massimo Bertagnoli (at Fermana until 30 June 2020)

No.	Pos.	Nation	Player
—	MF	ITA	Nicola Danieli (at Virtus Verona until 30 June 2020)
—	MF	POR	Nuno Pina (at Belenenses SAD until 30 June 2021)
—	MF	ITA	Andrea Magrini (at Carpi until 30 June 2020)
—	FW	ITA	Michael Fabbro (at Pisa until 30 June 2020)
—	FW	GHA	Bismark Ngissah (at Vis Pesaro until 30 June 2020)
—	FW	ITA	Manuel Pucciarelli (at Pescara until 30 June 2020)
—	FW	ESP	Alejandro Rodríguez (at Virtus Entella until 30 June 2021)
—	FW	POL	Mariusz Stępiński (at Verona until 30 June 2020)

== Competitions ==
=== Overview ===
Competition	First match	Last match	Starting round	Final position	Record							
Competition	First match	Last match	Starting round	Final position	Pld	W	D	L	GF	GA	GD	Win %
Serie B	25 August 2019	31 July 2020	Matchday 1	6th	38	14	14	10	48	38	+10	36.84
Serie B promotion play-offs	4 August 2020	11 August 2020	Preliminary round	Semi-finals	3	1	1	1	4	4	+0	33.33
Coppa Italia	11 August 2019	18 August 2019	Second round	Third round	2	0	1	1	2	3	−1	0.00
Total					43	15	16	12	54	45	+9	34.88

Source: Soccerway

=== Serie B ===
==== League table ====
Pos	Team	Pld	W	D	L	GF	GA	GD	Pts	Promotion, qualification or relegation
4	Pordenone	38	16	10	12	48	46	+2	58 (Note: Pordenone finished ahead of Cittadella on head-to-head points: Pordenone 0–0 Cittadella, Cittadella 0–2 Pordenone.)	Qualification for promotion play-offs semi-finals
5	Cittadella	38	17	7	14	49	49	0	58	Qualification for promotion play-offs preliminary round
6	Chievo	38	14	14	10	48	38	+10	56	Qualification for promotion play-offs preliminary round
7	Empoli	38	14	12	12	47	48	−1	54 (Note: Head-to-head points: Empoli 9, Frosinone 5, Pisa 2.)	Qualification for promotion play-offs preliminary round
8	Frosinone	38	14	12	12	41	38	+3	54	Qualification for promotion play-offs preliminary round

Source: Lega Serie B (in Italian) SOCCERWAY (in English)
Rules for classification: 1) Points; 2) Head-to-head points; 3) Head-to-head goal difference; 4) Goal difference; 5) Goals scored; 6) Draw.

==== Results summary ====
Overall								Home						Away					
Pld	W	D	L	GF	GA	GD	Pts	W	D	L	GF	GA	GD	W	D	L	GF	GA	GD
38	14	14	10	48	38	+10	56	10	4	5	29	18	+11	4	10	5	19	20	−1

==== Results by round ====
Round	1	2	3	4	5	6	7	8	9	10	11	12	13	14	15	16	17	18	19	20	21	22	23	24	25	26	27	28	29	30	31	32	33	34	35	36	37	38
Ground	A	H	A	H	A	H	A	H	A	H	A	A	H	A	H	H	A	H	A	H	A	H	A	H	A	H	A	H	A	H	H	A	H	A	A	H	A	H
Result	L	D	W	D	D	D	W	W	D	W	D	L	W	L	W	L	D	L	D	W	D	L	D	W	W	L	D	W	D	L	W	D	D	L	L	W	W	W
Position	13	15	11	11	13	13	10	6	7	3	4	7	4	7	4	7	7	11	11	6	7	11	11	9	7	8	9	8	8	8	7	8	8	9	10	10	7	6

A = Away; H = Home; W = Win; D = Draw; L = Loss

==== Matches ====
25 August 2019 1	Perugia	2–1	Chievo	Perugia
CEST (UTC+2)				Stadium: Stadio Renato Curi

30 August 2019 2	Chievo	1–1	Empoli	Verona
CEST (UTC+2)				Stadium: Marcantonio Bentegodi

14 September 2019 3	Venezia	0–2	Chievo	Venice
CEST (UTC+2)				Stadium: Pier Luigi Penzo Stadium

21 September 2019 4	Chievo	2–2	Pisa	Verona
CEST (UTC+2)				Stadium: Marcantonio Bentegodi

25 September 2019 5	Salernitana	1–1	Chievo	Salerno
CEST (UTC+2)				Stadium: Stadio Arechi

29 September 2019 6	Chievo	1–1	Pordenone	Verona
CEST (UTC+2)				Stadium: Marcantonio Bentegodi

5 October 2019 7	Livorno	3–4	Chievo	Livorno
CEST (UTC+2)				Stadium: Armando Picchi Stadium

20 October 2019 8	Chievo	2–0	Ascoli	Verona
CEST (UTC+2)				Stadium: Marcantonio Bentegodi

26 October 2019 9	Cosenza	1–1	Chievo	Cosenza
CEST (UTC+2)				Stadium: Stadium Gigi Marulla

29 October 2019 10	Chievo	2–1	Crotone	Verona
CET (UTC+1)				Stadium: Marcantonio Bentegodi

1 November 2019 11	Spezia	0–0	Chievo	La Spezia
CET (UTC+1)				Stadium: Alberto Picco

10 November 2019 12	Frosinone	2–0	Chievo	Frosinone
CET (UTC+1)				Stadium: Stadio Benito Stirpe

25 November 2019 13	Chievo	2–1	Virtus Entella	Verona
CET (UTC+1)				Stadium: Marcantonio Bentegodi

1 December 2019 14	Trapani	1–0	Chievo	Trapani
CET (UTC+1)				Stadium: Stadio Polisportivo Provinciale

7 December 2019 15	Chievo	1–0	Cremonese	Verona
CET (UTC+1)				Stadium: Marcantonio Bentegodi

13 December 2019 16	Chievo	2–3	Juve Stabia	Verona
CET (UTC+1)				Stadium: Marcantonio Bentegodi

21 December 2019 17	Cittadella	1–1	Chievo	Cittadella
CET (UTC+1)				Stadium: Stadio Pier Cesare Tombolato

26 December 2019 18	Chievo	1–2	Benevento	Verona
CET (UTC+1)				Stadium: Marcantonio Bentegodi

29 December 2019 19	Pescara	0–0	Chievo	Pescara
CET (UTC+1)				Stadium: Stadio Adriatico – Giovanni Cornacchia

18 January 2020 20	Chievo	2–0	Perugia	Verona
CET (UTC+1)				Stadium: Marcantonio Bentegodi

24 January 2020 21	Empoli	1–1	Chievo	Empoli
CET (UTC+1)				Stadium: Stadio Carlo Castellani

2 February 2020 22	Chievo	0–1	Venezia	Verona
CET (UTC+1)				Stadium: Marcantonio Bentegodi

9 February 2020 23	Pisa	1–1	Chievo	Pisa
CET (UTC+1)				Stadium: Arena Garibaldi – Stadio Romeo Anconetani

17 February 2020 24	Chievo	2–0	Salernitana	Verona
CET (UTC+1)				Stadium: Marcantonio Bentegodi

23 February 2020 25	Pordenone	0–1	Chievo	Udine
CET (UTC+1)				Stadium: Stadio Friuli

29 February 2020 26	Chievo	0–1	Livorno	Verona
CET (UTC+1)				Stadium: Marcantonio Bentegodi

4 March 2020 27	Ascoli	1–1	Chievo	Ascoli Piceno
CET (UTC+1)				Stadium: Stadio Cino e Lillo Del Duca

9 March 2020 28	Chievo	2–0	Cosenza	Verona
CET (UTC+1)				Stadium: Marcantonio Bentegodi

20 June 2020 29	Crotone	1–1	Chievo	Crotone
CEST (UTC+2)				Stadium: Stadio Ezio Scida

26 June 2020 30	Chievo	1–3	Spezia	Verona
CEST (UTC+2)				Stadium: Marcantonio Bentegodi

29 June 2020 31	Chievo	2–0	Frosinone	Verona
CEST (UTC+2)				Stadium: Marcantonio Bentegodi

3 July 2020 32	Virtus Entella	1–1	Chievo	Chiavari
CEST (UTC+2)				Stadium: Stadio Comunale

10 July 2020 33	Chievo	1–1	Trapani	Verona
CEST (UTC+2)				Stadium: Marcantonio Bentegodi

13 July 2020 34	Cremonese	1–0	Chievo	Cremona
CEST (UTC+2)				Stadium: Stadio Giovanni Zini

17 July 2020 35	Juve Stabia	3–2	Chievo	Castellammare di Stabia
CEST (UTC+2)				Stadium: Stadio Romeo Menti

24 July 2020 36	Chievo	4–1	Cittadella	Verona
CEST (UTC+2)				Stadium: Marcantonio Bentegodi

27 July 2020 37	Benevento	0–1	Chievo	Benevento
CEST (UTC+2)				Stadium: Stadio Ciro Vigorito

31 July 2020 38	Chievo	1–0	Pescara	Verona
CEST (UTC+2)				Stadium: Marcantonio Bentegodi

==== Promotion play-offs ====
4 August 2020 Preliminary round	Chievo	1–1 (a.e.t.)	Empoli	Verona
21:00 CEST (UTC+2)	Garritano 97'		Tutino 110'	Stadium: Marcantonio Bentegodi; Attendance: 0 Referee: Davide Ghersini

8 August 2020 Semi-finals; First leg	Chievo	2–0	Spezia	Verona
21:00 CEST (UTC+2)	Đorđević 2'; Segre 9'			Stadium: Marcantonio Bentegodi; Attendance: 0 Referee: Riccardo Ros

11 August 2020 Semi-finals; Second leg	Spezia	3–1 (3–3 agg.)	Chievo	La Spezia
21:00 CEST (UTC+2)	Galabinov 2'; Maggiore 50'; Nzola 53'		Leverbe 90+3' (pen.)	Stadium: Alberto Picco; Attendance: 0 Referee: Eugenio Abbattista

=== Coppa Italia ===
11 August 2019 Second round	Chievo	1–1 (a.e.t.) (3–1 p)	Ravenna	Verona
CEST (UTC+2)				Stadium: Marcantonio Bentegodi

18 August 2019 Third round	Cagliari	2–1	Chievo	Cagliari
20:30 CEST (UTC+2)				Stadium: Sardegna Arena
