= Matteo Calcagno =

Italian footballer, defender

Personal information
- Date of birth: 4 February 2000 (age 26)
- Place of birth: Genoa, Italy
- Height: 1.85 m (6 ft 1 in)
- Position: Defender

Youth career
- Genoa

Senior career*
Years	Team	Apps	(Gls)
2017–2018	Genoa	0	(0)
2017–2018	→ Albissola (loan)	34	(0)
2018–2019	Albissola	31	(0)
2019–2021	Virtus Francavilla	19	(0)
2020	→ Arzignano (loan)	0	(0)
2021	Ancona-Matelica	0	(0)
2021–2022	Ligorna	34	(0)
2022	Genova Calcio		
- * Club domestic league appearances and goals as of 18:58, 24 September 2023 (UTC)

Matteo Calcagno (born 4 February 2000) is an Italian footballer who plays as a defender.

== Club career ==
Calcagno started his career in Genoa, on the summer of 2017, he was loaned to Serie D side Albissola to the 2017–18. The team promoted to Serie C, they made Gulli's signing permanent on the summer of 2018. He made his professional debut in the 6th round of 2018–19 season, playing 90 minutes in the 1–1 home won against Piacenza.

On 16 July 2019, he signed with Virtus Francavilla. On 31 January 2020, he was loaned to Arzignano until the end of the 2019–20 season.

On 18 August 2021, he signed with Ancona-Matelica in Serie C. Just two weeks later, his contract was terminated by mutual consent for family reasons.

On 18 September 2021, he joined Serie D club Ligorna.

== Sources ==
- Matteo Calcagno at TuttoCalciatori.net (in Italian)
- Matteo Calcagno at Soccerway (archived)
