= Boffelli =

Boffelli is an Italian surname. Notable people with the surname include:

- Andrea Boffelli (born 1997), Italian footballer
- Emiliano Boffelli (born 1995), Argentine rugby player
