= Alessandro Gabbani =

Italian footballer (born 1999)

Personal information
- Date of birth: 13 July 1999 (age 27)
- Place of birth: Rome, Italy
- Height: 1.80 m (5 ft 11 in)
- Position: Midfielder

Team information
- Current team: Stetson Hatters
- Number: 29

Youth career
- –2018: Sampdoria

College career
Years	Team	Apps	(Gls)
2021–	Stetson Hatters	13	(0)

Senior career*
Years	Team	Apps	(Gls)
2018–2020	Sampdoria	0	(0)
2018–2020	→ Vis Pesaro (loan)	12	(0)
2020–2021	Arzignano	19	(0)
- * Club domestic league appearances and goals as of 14 July 2022

Alessandro Gabbani (born 13 July 1999) is an Italian footballer who plays as a midfielder for Stetson Hatters.

== Club career ==
=== Sampdoria ===
He is a product of Sampdoria youth teams and started playing for their Under-19 squad in the 2016–17 season.

==== Loan to Vis Pesaro ====
On 15 July 2018, Gabbani joined Serie C club Vis Pesaro on a season-long loan. On 4 November he made his professional debut Serie C for Vis Pesaro in a 2–0 away win over Virtus Verona as an 88th-minute substitute for Álex Pastor. On 22 December, Gabbani played his first match as a starter for the team, a 1–1 away draw against Rimini, he was replaced by Ibourahima Baldè in the 54th minute. Gabbani ended his season-long loan to Vis Pesaro with only 5 appearances, including 2 as a starter.

=== Arzignano ===
On 24 September 2020, he signed with Arzignano.

=== College career ===
In September 2021, he joined Stetson Hatters, Stetson University in the United States.

== Career statistics ==
=== Club ===
As of match played 30 May 2021

Club	Season	League			Cup		Europe		Other		Total	
Club	Season	League	Apps	Goals	Apps	Goals	Apps	Goals	Apps	Goals	Apps	Goals
Vis Pesaro (loan)	2018–19	Serie C	5	0	0	0	—		—		5	0
Vis Pesaro (loan)	2019–20	Serie C	7	0	0	0	—		—		7	0
Vis Pesaro (loan)	Total		12	0	0	0	—		—		12	0
Arzignano	2020–21	Serie D	19	0	0	0	—		—		19	0
Career total			31	0	0	0	—		—		19	0
