= Gianmarco Vannucchi =

Italian footballer (born 1995)

Personal information
- Date of birth: 30 July 1995 (age 31)
- Place of birth: Santa Lucia, Prato, Italy
- Height: 1.84 m (6 ft 0 in)
- Position: Goalkeeper

Team information
- Current team: Benevento
- Number: 26

Youth career
- 2011–2015: Juventus
- 2012–2013: → Pro Vercelli (loan)
- 2014–2015: → Renate (loan)

Senior career*
Years	Team	Apps	(Gls)
2015–2018	Alessandria	88	(0)
2018–2020	Salernitana	4	(0)
2020–2022	Padova	33	(0)
2022–2024	Taranto	71	(0)
2024–2025	Ternana	35	(0)
2025–	Benevento	36	(0)
- * Club domestic league appearances and goals as of 1 May 2026

Gianmarco Vannucchi (born 30 July 1995) is an Italian professional footballer who plays as a goalkeeper for Serie B club Benevento.

== Club career ==
As a product of Juventus, Vannuchi never made his first team debut, the Turin club loaned him to Pro Vercelli, and later Renate. In 2015, Lega Pro side Alessandria signed him, he made his professional debut on 11 July 2015, in the 10th round of 2015–16 season against Pro Patria, he became the constant member of the starting team for the rest of the season. In the summer of 2018, Serie B side Salernitana signed him for an undisclosed fee.

On 27 August 2020 he became a new Padova player.

From September 2022 is a new Taranto player, a team in which he made his debut on 18 September 2022 in the match against Fidelis Andria which ended with the score of 2–1.

On 29 August 2024, Vannucchi signed a two-season contract with Ternana.

On 9 July 2025, Vannucchi signs a contract with Benevento.
