= Michele Pini =

Italian footballer

Personal information
- Date of birth: 23 August 1986
- Place of birth: Italy
- Position(s): Defender, Midfielder

Senior career*
Years	Team	Apps	(Gls)
-2005	U.S. Pergolettese 1932		
2005-2006	A.C. Rodengo Saiano		
2006/2007	U.S. Cremonese		
2006/07-2012	F.C. Lumezzane V.G.Z. A.S.D.	136	(1)
2012-2014	F.C. Castiglione	58	(0)
2014-2015	F.C. Lumezzane V.G.Z. A.S.D.	20	(0)
- *Club domestic league appearances and goals

Michele Pini (born 23 August 1986 in Italy) is an Italian footballer.

== Career ==
In 2015, at the age of 28, Pini retired from football, leaving Lumezzane to work at a factory because the latter earned more money.
