= Andrea D'Egidio =

Italian footballer (born 1996)

Personal information
- Date of birth: 30 June 1996 (age 30)
- Place of birth: Sant'Omero, Italy
- Height: 1.86 m (6 ft 1 in)
- Position: Goalkeeper

Youth career
- –2014: Ascoli

Senior career*
Years	Team	Apps	(Gls)
2014–2018	Ascoli	0	(0)
2016–2017	→ Matera (loan)	5	(0)
2017–2018	→ Südtirol (loan)	0	(0)
2018–2020	Pisa	1	(0)
2020–2021	Teramo	55	(0)
2022	Teramo	0	(0)
2022–2023	Pineto	1	(10)
- * Club domestic league appearances and goals as of 7 May 2023

Andrea D'Egidio (born 30 June 1996) is an Italian professional footballer who plays as a goalkeeper.

== Career ==
=== Club ===
Growing up in Ascoli's youth sector, he was in the 2014/2015 season the least beaten goalkeeper of all rounds of the "Berretti" national championship defending the bianconeri posts of the Marche-based formation. He was promoted to the first team at the age of 18 before being sold on loan to Matera in 2016. He made his debut in the league match against Akragas in October. At the end of the season he returned to base, only to be sold again on loan, this time to Südtirol.

At the end of the 2017/2018 season, his contract with Ascoli expires and he moves to Pisa on a zero-parameter basis, staying in Serie C. He makes his debut with the Nerazzurri jersey in the Coppa Italia Serie C match against Viterbese in the quarterfinals. At the end of the season he was promoted to Serie B and renewed his contract for another year. Pisa came close to making the play-offs to go to Serie A, finishing tied on points with Frosinone, but without qualifying.

D'Egidio remains untied and settles in with Teramo until 2022, when he signs with Pineto in Serie D and immediately wins the championship, clinching promotion to Serie C thanks to 1st place in Group F.

=== National team ===
He has been a member of the roster of the Italian National Pro League Under-18 team.
