= Andrea Petrucci =

Italian footballer (born 1991)

Personal information
- Date of birth: 16 June 1991 (age 35)
- Place of birth: Arquata del Tronto, Italy
- Height: 1.80 m (5 ft 11 in)
- Position: Forward

Team information
- Current team: Forlì
- Number: 10

Youth career
- –2011: Ascoli

Senior career*
Years	Team	Apps	(Gls)
2008–2011	Ascoli	0	(0)
2008–2009	→ Atletico Piceno (loan)	32	(8)
2009–2010	→ Fermana (loan)	33	(8)
2011	→ Maceratese (loan)	12	(2)
2011–2012	San Marco Servigliano	21	(8)
2012–2013	Grottammare	28	(1)
2013–2014	Folgore Veregra	26	(6)
2014	Porto D'Ascoli	11	(0)
2014–2016	Monticelli	46	(11)
2016–2018	Fermana	62	(15)
2018–2019	Carpi	0	(0)
2018–2019	→ Vis Pesaro (loan)	33	(4)
2019–2020	Fermana	16	(2)
2020–2021	Feralpisalò	21	(1)
2021–	Forlì	0	(21)
- * Club domestic league appearances and goals as of 2 June 2021

Andrea Petrucci (born 16 June 1991) is an Italian football player. He plays for Forlì F.C.

== Club career ==
He made his Serie C debut for Fermana on 27 August 2017 in a game against Ravenna.

On 1 August 2019 he returned to Fermana for the third stint with the club.

On 3 August 2020 he signed a 2-year contract with Feralpisalò.

On 10 August 2021, he joined to Forlì F.C.
