= Alessio Milillo =

Italian footballer (born 1997)

Personal information
- Date of birth: 31 March 1997 (age 29)
- Place of birth: Ortona, Italy
- Height: 1.99 m (6 ft 6 in)
- Position: Defender

Team information
- Current team: Arzignano
- Number: 57

Youth career
- –2016: Pescara

Senior career*
| Years | Team | Apps | (Gls) |
| 2015–2018 | Pescara | 0 | (0) |
| 2016–2017 | → San Nicolò (loan) | 31 | (0) |
| 2017–2018 | → Teramo (loan) | 17 | (0) |
| 2018–2020 | Viterbese | 12 | (0) |
| 2020 | Lecco | 2 | (0) |
| 2020–2022 | Mantova | 55 | (3) |
| 2022–2023 | Fidelis Andria | 15 | (0) |
| 2023– | Arzignano | 102 | (7) |
- * Club domestic league appearances and goals as of 30 April 2026

Alessio Milillo (born 31 March 1997) is an Italian professional footballer who plays as a defender for Serie C Group A club Arzignano.

== Club career ==
He made his Serie C debut for Teramo on 29 October 2017 in a game against AlbinoLeffe.

On 15 January 2020 he joined Lecco. On 12 August 2020 he moved to Mantova.

On 18 August 2022, Milillo signed with Fidelis Andria.

On 25 January 2023, Milillo moved to Arzignano until the end of the 2022–23 season.
