= Andrea Boffelli =

Italian football player (born 1997)

Personal information
- Date of birth: 14 March 1997 (age 29)
- Place of birth: Sarnico, Italy
- Height: 1.77 m (5 ft 10 in)
- Position: Defender

Team information
- Current team: Lumezzane
- Number: 30

Youth career
- –2016: Atalanta

Senior career*
Years	Team	Apps	(Gls)
2016–2020	Atalanta	0	(0)
2016–2017	→ Pontisola (loan)	29	(4)
2017–2018	→ Mestre (loan)	12	(0)
2018–2020	→ Pro Patria (loan)	47	(1)
2020–2023	Pro Patria	101	(3)
2023–2026	Arzignano	86	(6)
2026–	Lumezzane	5	(0)
- * Club domestic league appearances and goals as of 26 September 2026

Andrea Boffelli (born 14 March 1997) is an Italian professional footballer who plays as a defender for Serie C Group A club Lumezzane.

== Club career ==
He made his Serie C debut for Mestre on 27 August 2017 in a game against Teramo.

After playing for Pro Patria on loan for two years, on 7 August 2020 he signed a 3-year contract with the club.

On 16 October 2023, Boffelli joined Arzignano.
