= Lorenzo Migliorelli =

Italian footballer

Personal information
- Date of birth: 3 May 1998 (age 28)
- Place of birth: Brescia, Italy
- Height: 1.82 m (6 ft 0 in)
- Position: Defender

Youth career
- –2017: FeralpiSalò
- 2015–2017: → Atalanta (loan)
- 2017–2018: Atalanta

Senior career*
| Years | Team | Apps | (Gls) |
| 2018–2020 | Atalanta | 0 | (0) |
| 2018–2019 | → Venezia (loan) | 0 | (0) |
| 2019 | → Virtus Entella (loan) | 6 | (0) |
| 2019–2020 | → Siena (loan) | 25 | (0) |
| 2020–2022 | Gubbio | 8 | (0) |
- * Club domestic league appearances and goals as of 22 December 2021

Lorenzo Migliorelli (born 3 May 1998) is an Italian football player.

== Club career ==
=== Atalanta ===
==== Loan to Venezia ====
On 9 July 2018, he joined Serie B club Venezia on a two-year loan. He did not make any appearances for Venezia in the first half of the 2018–19 season, and the loan was terminated early on 25 January 2019.

==== Loan to Virtus Entella ====
On the same day, he joined Virtus Entella on loan. He made his Serie C debut for Virtus on 27 January 2019 in a game against Cuneo, as a 64th-minute substitute for Carlo Crialese.

==== Loan to Siena ====
On 11 July 2019, he joined Siena on loan.

=== Gubbio ===
On 19 August 2020 he joined Gubbio. On 13 January 2022, his contract was terminated by mutual consent.
