= Nicholas Battaiola =

Italian footballer

Personal information
- Date of birth: 21 August 1996 (age 30)
- Place of birth: Cremona, Italy
- Height: 1.85 m (6 ft 1 in)
- Position: Goalkeeper

Youth career
- 2012–2014: Cremonese

Senior career*
Years	Team	Apps	(Gls)
2014–2019	Cremonese	8	(0)
2015–2016	→ Ciliverghe Mazzano (loan)	37	(0)
2016–2017	→ Monza (loan)	33	(0)
2017–2018	→ Virtus Francavilla (loan)	1	(0)
2018–2019	→ Gubbio (loan)	1	(0)
2019–2023	Fiorenzuola	128	(0)
- * Club domestic league appearances and goals as of 23 April 2023

Nicholas Battaiola (born 21 August 1996) is an Italian footballer who plays as a goalkeeper.

== Club career ==
On 1 July 2019, he signed with Fiorenzuola.

== Honours ==
=== Club ===
Monza

- Serie D: 2016–17
- Scudetto Dilettanti: 2016–17

Fiorenzuola

- Serie D: 2020–21
