= Michele Troiani =

Italian footballer

Personal information
- Date of birth: 21 July 1996 (age 30)
- Place of birth: Verona, Italy
- Height: 1.81 m (5 ft 11 in)
- Position: Right-back

Youth career
- –2016: Chievo
- 2014–2015: → Torino (loan)

Senior career*
| Years | Team | Apps | (Gls) |
| 2014–2020 | Chievo | 0 | (0) |
| 2015–2016 | → Benevento (loan) | 19 | (1) |
| 2017–2018 | → Triestina (loan) | 17 | (2) |
| 2018–2019 | → Piacenza (loan) | 15 | (2) |
| 2021–2024 | Lumezzane | 25 | (1) |

International career
| 2014 | Italy U-18 | 5 | (0) |
| 2014–2015 | Italy U-19 | 10 | (0) |
| 2015–2016 | Italy U-20 | 6 | (0) |
- * Club domestic league appearances and goals as of 28 April 2024

Michele Troiani (born 21 July 1996) is an Italian football player.

== Club career ==
=== ChievoVerona ===
==== Loan to Benevento ====
On 26 August 2015, Troiani was loaned to Serie C side Benevento on a season-long loan deal. On 13 September he made his professional debut in Serie C for Benevento as a substitute replacing Francesco Mazzarani in the 80th minute of a 1–1 away draw against Lupa Castelli Romani. On 23 September he played his first entire match for Benevento, a 0–0 home draw against Messina. On 2 April 2016 he scored his first professional goal in 62nd minute of a 3–2 home win over Ischia. Troiani ended his season-long loan to Benevento with 19 appearances and 1 goal, he also helps the team to win the Serie C title.

==== Loan to Triestina ====
After spend all the 2016–17 as an unused substitute for ChievoVerona, on 17 August 2017, Troiani was signed by Serie C club Triestina on a season-long loan deal. On 3 September he made his debut for Triestina in Serie C in a 1–1 home draw against Reggiana, he played the entire match. On 5 November he scored his first goal for Triestina in the 50th minute and the second after 22 minutes, in the 72nd minute of a 4–2 away win over Pordenone. Troiani ended his season-long loan to Triestina win 17 appearances, 12 as a starter and 2 goals.

==== Loan to Piacenza ====
On 13 July 2018, Troiani was loaned to Serie C club Piacenza on a season-long loan deal. On 29 July he made his debut for Piacenza as a substitute replacing Cristian Cauz in the 91st minute, but he was sent off with a double yellow card in the 107th minute of a match loss 5–3 at penalties after a 1–1 away draw against Monopoli in the first round of Coppa Italia. On 26 September he made his Serie C debut for Piacenza in a 4–3 away win over Gozzano, he played the entire match. On 17 October, Troiani was sent-off for the second time this season with a double yellow card in the 58th minute of a 2–1 home win over Carrarese. On 5 November he played his first entire match for Piacenza in Serie C, 2–0 away win over Juventus U23. One week later he scored his first goal in the 15th minute of a 3–1 home win over Pro Piacenza. On 9 December he scored his second goal in the 67th minute of a 3–1 home win over Arzachena.

== Career statistics ==
=== Club ===
As of 13 December 2018

| Club | Season | League | | | Cup | | Europe | | Other | | Total | |
| Club | Season | League | Apps | Goals | Apps | Goals | Apps | Goals | Apps | Goals | Apps | Goals |
|---|---|---|---|---|---|---|---|---|---|---|---|---|
| Benevento (loan) | 2015–16 | Serie C | 19 | 1 | 0 | 0 | — | | — | | 19 | 1 |
| ChievoVerona | 2016–17 | Serie A | 0 | 0 | 0 | 0 | — | | — | | 0 | 0 |
| Triestina (loan) | 2017–18 | Serie C | 17 | 2 | 0 | 0 | — | | — | | 17 | 2 |
| Piacenza (loan) | 2018–19 | Serie C | 11 | 2 | 1 | 0 | — | | — | | 12 | 2 |
| Career total | | | 47 | 5 | 1 | 0 | — | | — | | 48 | 5 |

== Honours ==
=== Club ===
ChievoVerona Primavera

- Campionato Nazionale Primavera: 2013–14

Torino Primavera

- Campionato Nazionale Primavera: 2014–15

Benevento

- Serie C: 2015–16
