= Luigi Dinielli =

Italian football player

Personal information
- Date of birth: 6 October 1996 (age 30)
- Place of birth: Bari, Italy
- Height: 1.86 m (6 ft 1 in)
- Position: Defender

Team information
- Current team: Fidelis Andria

Youth career
- –2015: Foggia

Senior career*
Years	Team	Apps	(Gls)
2015–2018	Foggia	1	(0)
2014–2015	→ Brindisi (loan)	3	(0)
2015	→ Altamura (loan)		
2016	→ Fondi (loan)	9	(0)
2017–2018	→ Paganese (loan)	7	(0)
2018–	Fidelis Andria	3	(0)
- * Club domestic league appearances and goals as of 2 October 2018

Luigi Dinielli (born 6 October 1996) is an Italian football player. He plays for Fidelis Andria.

== Club career ==
He made his Serie C debut for Foggia on 29 December 2016 in a game against Siracusa.
