= Alessandro Turrin =

Italian footballer (born 1997)

Personal information
- Date of birth: 10 March 1997 (age 29)
- Place of birth: San Vito al Tagliamento, Italy
- Height: 1.89 m (6 ft 2 1/2 in)
- Position: Goalkeeper

Youth career
- –2014: Atalanta

Senior career*
Years	Team	Apps	(Gls)
2016–2019	Atalanta	0	(0)
2016–2017	→ Forlì (loan)	40	(0)
2017	→ Gubbio (loan)	0	(0)
2017–2018	→ Reggina (loan)	0	(0)
2018–2019	→ Virtus Francavilla (loan)	4	(0)
2019	→ Imolese (loan)	0	(0)
- * Club domestic league appearances and goals as of 2 June 2019

Alessandro Turrin (born 10 March 1997) is an Italian football player.

== Club career ==
He made his Serie C debut for Forlì on 27 August 2016 in a game against Venezia.

On 29 June 2018, he moved on a season-long loan to Virtus Francavilla. On 10 January 2019, he moved on another loan at Imolese.
