= Matteo Salvi (footballer) =

Italian footballer

Personal information
- Date of birth: 20 March 1999 (age 27)
- Place of birth: Pontedera, Italy
- Height: 1.96 m (6 ft 5 in)
- Position: Defender

Team information
- Current team: Chievo

Youth career
- 2007–2015: Empoli
- 2015–2018: Pisa
- 2017–2018: → Atalanta (loan)
- 2018–2019: Atalanta
- 2018–2019: → SPAL (loan)

Senior career*
| Years | Team | Apps | (Gls) |
| 2016–2017 | Pisa | 0 | (0) |
| 2018–2022 | Atalanta | 0 | (0) |
| 2018–2019 | → SPAL (loan) | 0 | (0) |
| 2019–2020 | → Pontedera (loan) | 2 | (0) |
| 2020–2021 | → Pistoiese (loan) | 17 | (0) |
| 2021–2022 | → Grosseto (loan) | 14 | (1) |
| 2022–2025 | Union Clodiense Chioggia | 57 | (2) |
| 2025–2026 | Treviso | 29 | (4) |
| 2026– | Chievo | 0 | (0) |
- * Club domestic league appearances and goals as of 3 May 2026

Matteo Salvi (born 20 March 1999) is an Italian footballer who plays as a defender for Serie D club Chievo.

== Club career ==
He spent most of his youth career with Empoli youth teams before transferring to Pisa in 2015. During the 2016–17 Serie B season, he received several call-ups to Pisa's senior squad, but did not see any field time. In the summer 2017, he moved to Atalanta youth squads. For the 2018–19 season, he was loaned to SPAL. He played for the youth team there, receiving one call-up to the senior squad for a Coppa Italia game.

On 10 July 2019, he joined Serie C club Pontedera on a season-long loan. He made his professional Serie C debut for Pontedera on 20 October 2019 in a game against Como. He substituted Daniele Mannini in the 83rd minute.

On 26 August 2020 he joined Pistoiese on loan. On 22 July 2021 he was loaned to Grosseto.
