= FC Lumezzane =

Italian association football club

Lumezzane
- Full name: Football Club Lumezzane srl
- Nickname: Lume
- Founded: 1946; 2018 (refounded)
- Ground: Stadio Tullio Saleri
- Capacity: 4,150
- Chairman: Andrea Caracciolo
- Manager: Paolo Sammarco
- League: Serie C Group A
- 2025–26: Serie C Group A, 7th of 20
- Website: www.fclumezzane.it
Home colours	Away colours

F.C. Lumezzane, commonly known just as Lumezzane, is an Italian association football club based in Lumezzane, Lombardy. The club currently competes in Serie C, the third tier of Italian football.

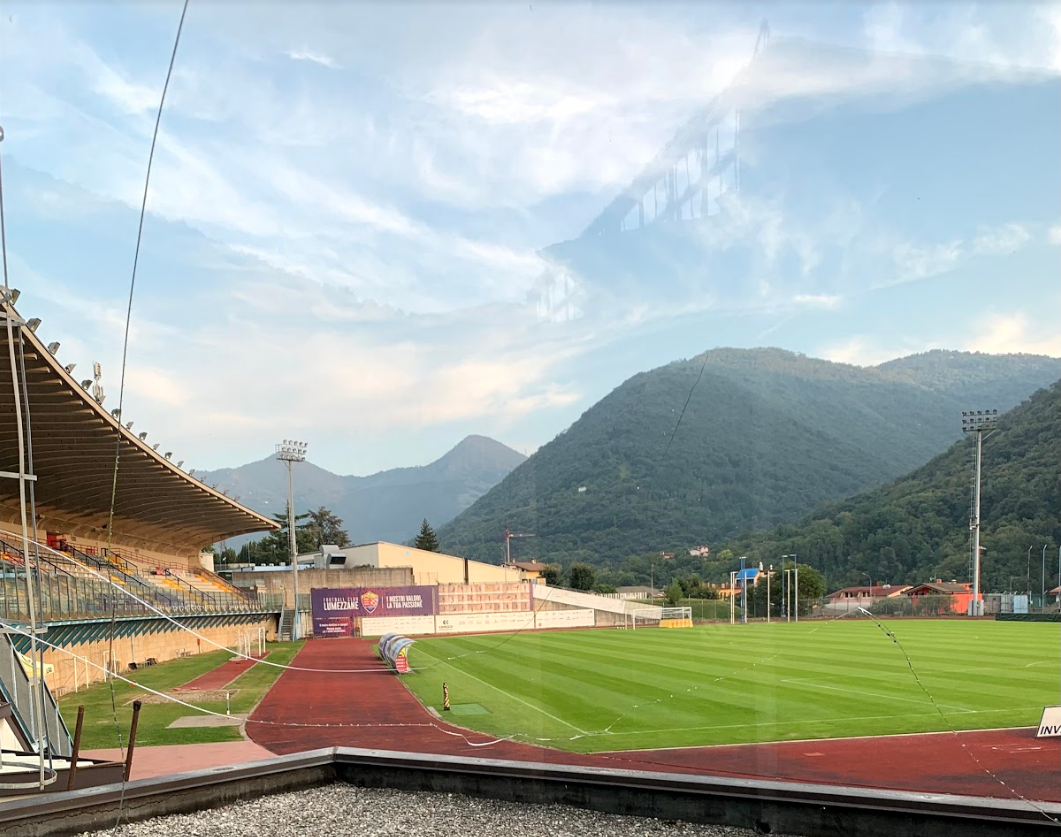
Stadio Tullio Saleri, home venue of FC Lumezzane

== History ==
=== A.C. Lumezzane ===
Lumezzane was founded in 1946.

The club was promoted to Serie C2 in 1993. Since the promotion, the club remained in the divisions Serie C1 (Lega Pro Prima Divisione) and Serie C2 (Lega Pro Seconda Divisione) from 1993 to 2014. The club also participated in 2014–15 Lega Pro season, the first unified Lega Pro/Serie C division since 1978.

In the regular season of 2007–08 Serie C2, Lumezzane finished fourth in the Group A and qualified for the promotional playoffs. The team defeated third-placed Rodengo Saiano in the semi-finals, 2–1 on aggregate. In the finals, it defeated fifth-placed Mezzocorona because it was the higher classified team after the pair ended in a 0–0 aggregate tie, thus winning promotion to the now-called Lega Pro Prima Divisione for the 2008–09 season.

On 26 November 2009, Lumezzane caused an upset in the 2009–10 Coppa Italia, beating Atalanta B.C. (a Serie A team) 3–1 away from home.

=== 2018 refoundation ===
A.C. Lumezzane relegated to Serie D in 2017. The club finished as the 15th of 2017–18 Serie D Group B, which relegated again. In June 2018, the club folded.

At the same time, another club, Associazione Sportiva Dilettantistica ValgobbiaZanano, was renamed to Football Club Lumezzane V.G.Z. Associazione Sportiva Dilettantistica, claiming as an heir of A.C. Lumezzane. V.G.Z. is the acronym of ValgobbiaZanano. The new club also acquired the logo and some assets of A.C. Lumezzane.

ValgobbiaZanano was a football club that finished as the regular season runner-up of Group D of Promozione Lombardy in 2017–18 season. However, the club was the losing side in the promotion play-offs. A.C. ValgobbiaZanano was a merger of "A.C. Valgobbia", a team from Lumezzane and "A.C. Zanano Comisport", a team from Zanano frazione of Sarezzo circa 2003. The prefix of the club was changed to A.S.D. from A.C. in some time later. Val Gobbia itself is a valley of the Lumezzane area.

In 2018–19 season, the new Lumezzane won the promotional playoffs of Group D, thus entered the final stage of the playoffs which compete with other winners from other groups, for the spot to promote to Eccellenza Lombardy in 2019–20 season. Lumezzane, however, lost to Sant'Angelo in aggregate in the first round of the inter-groups playoffs. In the season 2019–20 Lumezzane competed in Eccellenza, the fifth tier of Italian football.

In 2021, the club's name was changed to F.C. Lumezzane S.S.D., thus severing every reference to ValgobbiaZanano. Lumezzane won promotion to Serie D in 2022 and a second consecutive promotion the following year, thus marking the club's return to professionalism after six years of amateur football.

== Current squad ==
As of 19 September 2026

Note: Flags indicate national team as defined under FIFA eligibility rules; some limited exceptions apply. Players may hold more than one non-FIFA nationality.

No.	Pos.	Nation	Player
1	GK	ITA	Stefano Filigheddu
4	MF	ITA	Fabrizio Paghera
5	MF	ITA	Samuele D'Agostino
6	DF	ITA	Nicola Gauli
7	FW	VEN	Ernesto Torregrossa
8	MF	ITA	Michele Rocca
9	FW	ITA	Tommaso Ebone (on loan from Bologna)
10	FW	ITA	Gaetano Monachello
11	FW	ITA	Alessandro Ghillani
12	GK	ITA	Martin Sebastian Busi
13	GK	ITA	Lorenzo Andrenacci
15	DF	SEN	Maissa Ndiaye
16	MF	ITA	Carlo Ghidini
19	FW	ITA	Mattia Rolando
21	DF	ITA	Jacopo Deratti
22	GK	ITA	Francesco Bonardi

No.	Pos.	Nation	Player
25	DF	ITA	Riccardo Alberido
27	MF	ITA	Alessandro Pavanati (on loan from Hellas Verona)
30	DF	ITA	Andrea Boffelli
32	FW	ITA	Gennaro Anatriello (on loan from Bologna)
33	MF	ITA	Yassine Abderma
42	DF	ITA	Davide Baroncioni
44	MF	ITA	Lorenzo Menegazzo (on loan from Bologna)
47	FW	ITA	Edoardo Ferretti
50	DF	ITA	Giuseppe D'Angelo (on loan from Napoli)
70	MF	BEL	Sasha Mancini
72	MF	ITA	Gioele Perina
76	MF	ITA	Francesco Simoncelli
77	DF	ITA	Samuele Diodato
90	MF	ITA	Samuel John Nwachukwu (on loan from Hellas Verona)
99	MF	ITA	Francesco Belvedere

=== Out on loan ===
Note: Flags indicate national team as defined under FIFA eligibility rules; some limited exceptions apply. Players may hold more than one non-FIFA nationality.

No.	Pos.	Nation	Player
—	GK	ITA	Lorenzo Battagliola (at Pro Palazzolo until 30 June 2027)
—	DF	ITA	Nicola Archetti (at Bologna U18 until 30 June 2027)

No.	Pos.	Nation	Player
—	DF	ITA	Filippo Papetti (at Pavonese until 30 June 2027)
—	MF	ITA	Matteo Scanzi (at Real Calepina until 30 June 2027)

== Players of note ==
- (Italy) Michele Pini (2006/07–12, 2014–15) - Made over 100 league appearances
- (Italy) Mario Balotelli (2006–07) - Champions League and Serie A winner of Inter Milan and Premier League and FA Cup winner of Manchester City, he graduated from Lumezzane academy and grew up nearby in Concesio.
- (Italy) Cristian Brocchi (1997–98) - Champions League, Serie A and Coppa Italia winner of AC Milan, he made 30 appearances for Lumezzane on loan during his third professional season.

== Colours and badge ==
The colours of the team are red and blue.

A.C. Lumezzane used a logo that resembled the crest of the comune of Lumezzane. F.C. Lumezzane also used a similar design, with the inclusion of the VGZ design from 2018.

== Honours ==
- Coppa Italia Serie C
  - Winners (1): 2009–10
