= Eros De Santis =

Italian footballer (born 1997)

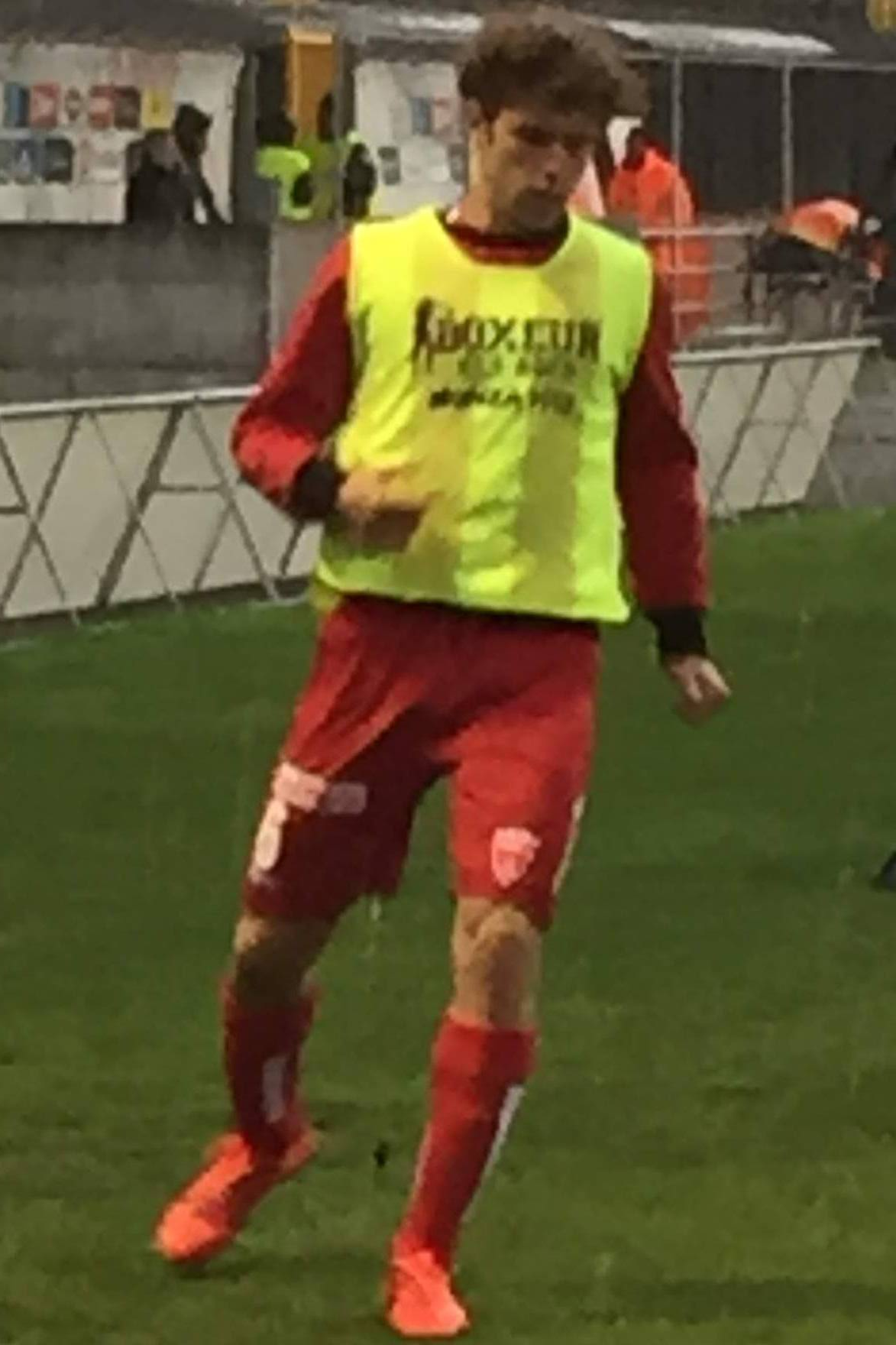
- De Santis with Monza in 2019

Personal information
- Date of birth: 30 October 1997 (age 29)
- Place of birth: Tivoli, Italy
- Height: 1.83 m (6 ft 0 in)
- Position: Right-back

Team information
- Current team: Arzignano
- Number: 31

Youth career
- –2017: Roma

Senior career*
Years	Team	Apps	(Gls)
2017–2018	Roma	0	(0)
2017–2018	→ Virtus Entella (loan)	13	(0)
2018–2020	Siena	10	(0)
2019	→ Monza (loan)	4	(0)
2020–2021	Viterbese	13	(0)
2021–2024	Latina	85	(0)
2024–2025	Team Altamura	32	(1)
2025–2026	Bra	34	(0)
2026–	Arzignano	1	(0)

International career^{‡}
2012	Italy U16	1	(0)
2018	Italy U20	2	(0)
- * Club domestic league appearances and goals as of 22 August 2026 ‡ National team caps and goals as of 25 April 2018

Eros De Santis (born 30 October 1997) is an Italian professional footballer who plays as a right-back for Serie C Group A club Arzignano.

== Club career ==
De Santis made his Serie B debut for Virtus Entella on 24 October 2017, in a game against Cremonese.

On 31 January 2019, Monza announced the signing of De Santis on loan from Siena, with an option to make the deal permanent at the end of the season.

On 16 January 2020, he joined Serie C club Viterbese.

== International career ==
De Santis was a youth international for Italy.
