= Francesco Golfo =

Italian footballer

Personal information
- Full name: Francesco Matteo Golfo
- Date of birth: 5 September 1994 (age 32)
- Place of birth: Palermo, Italy
- Height: 1.65 m (5 ft 5 in)
- Position: Winger

Team information
- Current team: ASD Ragusa Calcio 1949
- Number: 24

Youth career
- Pianese

Senior career*
Years	Team	Apps	(Gls)
2011–2018	Pianese	208	(50)
2018–2022	Parma	0	(0)
2018–2020	→ Trapani (loan)	26	(4)
2020	→ Potenza (loan)	8	(1)
2020–2021	→ Juve Stabia (loan)	11	(1)
2021	→ Catania (loan)	15	(2)
2021–2022	→ Vibonese (loan)	19	(3)
2022–2023	Picerno	26	(4)
2023–2024	Brindisi	9	(0)
2024	Monterosi	3	(0)
2024–2025	Gelbison	31	(2)
2025–2026	Paternò	14	(1)
2026–	ASD Ragusa Calcio 1949	16	(3)
- * Club domestic league appearances and goals as of 27 September 2026

Francesco Matteo Golfo (born 5 September 1994) is an Italian footballer who plays as a winger for Serie D club ASD Ragusa Calcio 1949.

== Club career ==
Golfo spent the first 7 seasons of his career with Pianese in Serie D.

On 6 July 2018, he signed a three-year contract with Serie A club Parma.

On 8 August 2018, he joined Serie C club Trapani on a season-long loan. He made his Serie C debut for Trapani on 18 September 2018 on in a game against Reggina as a starter and scored twice on his debut. The loan was renewed on 29 July 2019.

On 24 January 2020 he joined Serie C club Potenza on loan until the end of the 2019–20 season.

On 8 September 2020 he was loaned to Juve Stabia. On 29 January 2021 he moved on a new loan to Catania.

On 31 August 2021, he joined Vibonese.

On 29 July 2022, Golfo moved to Picerno.
