= Giuseppe Rizzo =

Italian footballer (born 1991)

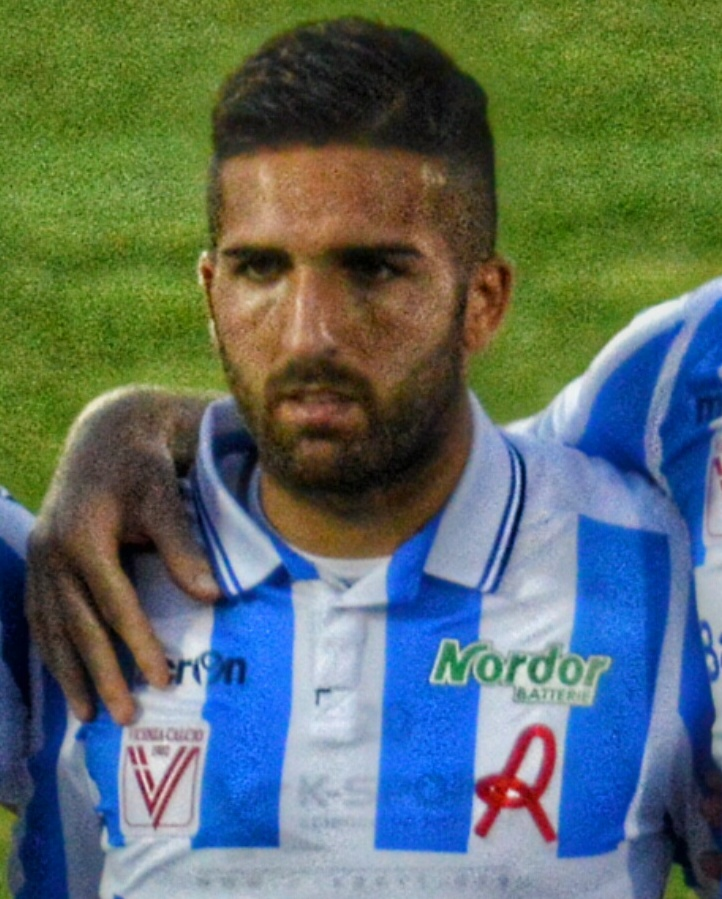

Personal information
- Date of birth: 18 March 1991 (age 35)
- Place of birth: Messina, Italy
- Height: 1.79 m (5 ft 10 1/2 in)
- Position: Defensive midfielder

Team information
- Current team: Locri
- Number: 18

Youth career
- Reggina

Senior career*
Years	Team	Apps	(Gls)
2009–2013	Reggina	91	(3)
2013	→ Pescara (loan)	11	(0)
2013–2014	Pescara	23	(0)
2014–2015	Reggina	14	(0)
2015	→ Perugia (loan)	9	(0)
2015–2017	Perugia	30	(0)
2016–2017	→ Vicenza (loan)	29	(1)
2017–2018	Salernitana	3	(0)
2018	→ Catania (loan)	20	(1)
2018–2020	Catania	43	(0)
2020–2021	Triestina	33	(1)
2021–2022	Pescara	12	(0)
2022	→ ACR Messina (loan)	11	(1)
2022–2024	Catania	36	(3)
2024	Pompei	9	(2)
2024–	Locri	0	(0)

International career
2010–2012	Italy U-21	2	(0)
- * Club domestic league appearances and goals as of 17 November 2024

Giuseppe Rizzo (born 18 March 1991) is an Italian footballer who plays as a midfielder for Serie D club Locri.

== Club career ==
He started his career in Serie B with Reggina, debuted for the club on 26 November 2009, in the Coppa Italia defeat against Palermo. His debut in Serie B was on 19 April 2010, against Crotone. The final result of the match was a win for Reggina. Rizzo made his first goal for the club on the match against Piacenza.

On 10 August 2020, he moved to Triestina on a 2-year contract.

On 31 August 2021 he returned to Pescara. On 29 January 2022, he joined his home town club ACR Messina on loan until the end of the season.

== International career ==
Rizzo was called up for the first time by manager Ciro Ferrara for the Italy U-21 squad in a friendly match against Turkey in November 2010. On 17 November 2010, the match was played at Stadio Bruno Recchioni in Fermo. The final result was 2-1, and Rizzo came off the bench for his debut in the 75th minute.

In the 2011–12 season, he played once for Italy under-21 Serie B representative team, the B team of the U21.
