= Nicola Danieli =

Italian footballer

Personal information
- Date of birth: 26 March 1998 (age 28)
- Place of birth: Sirmione, Italy
- Height: 1.78 m (5 ft 10 in)
- Position: Midfielder

Team information
- Current team: Tropical Coriano

Youth career
- –2018: Chievo

Senior career*
Years	Team	Apps	(Gls)
2018–2020	Chievo	0	(0)
2018–2019	→ Virtus Verona (loan)	19	(1)
2019–2020	→ Virtus Verona (loan)	19	(1)
2020–2022	Virtus Verona	62	(0)
2022–2023	Adriese	24	(1)
2023–2024	Clivense	34	(5)
2024–2025	Chievo	26	(0)
2025–	Tropical Coriano	17	(0)
- * Club domestic league appearances and goals as of 22 February 2026

Nicola Danieli (born 26 March 1998) is an Italian footballer who plays as a midfielder for Serie D club Tropical Coriano.

== Club career ==
=== ChievoVerona ===
Born in Sirmione, Danileli was a youth exponent of ChievoVerona.

==== Loan to Virtus Verona ====
On 13 July 2018, Danieli was signed by Serie C side Virtus Verona on a season-long loan deal. On 16 September he made his Serie C debut for Virtus Verona as a substitute replacing Luca Manarin in the 70th minute of a 2–0 away defeat against Fermana. One week later, on 23 September he played his first match as a starter for Virtus Verona, a 2–0 home defeat against Monza, he was replaced after 46 minutes by Giulio Fasolo. On 1 December he played his first entire match for Virtus Verona, a 2–1 home defeat against Sambenedettese. On 26 December he scored his first professional goal in the 22nd minute of a 3–1 home win over Gubbio. Danieli ended his loan to Virtus Verona with 19 appearances and 1 goal.

On 17 July 2019, Danieli returned to Serie C club Virtus Verona with another season-long loan deal. On 25 August he played his first match of the season as a substitute replacing Filippo Pellacani in the 56th minute of a 3–1 home defeat against Padova. On 22 September, Danieli played his first match of the season as a starter, a 3–2 home win over Triestina, he was replaced after 77 minutes by Manuel Di Paola. One week later, on 29 September, he was sent-off with a double yellow card in the 23rd minute of a 2–1 home defeat against Vicenza Virtus. On 19 October he scored his first goal of the season in the 7th minute of a 2–1 away win over Sambenedettese. Danieli ended his second season on loan to Virus Verona with 19 appearances, 1 goal and 1 assist.

=== Virtus Verona ===
On 31 July 2020, after 2 years on loan, Danieli joined to Virtus Verona on a free-transfer and he signed a 2-year contract.

== Career statistics ==
=== Club ===
As of 11 April 2021

Club	Season	League			Cup		Europe		Other		Total	
Club	Season	League	Apps	Goals	Apps	Goals	Apps	Goals	Apps	Goals	Apps	Goals
Virtus Verona (loan)	2018–19	Serie C	19	1	0	0	—		—		19	1
Virtus Verona (loan)	2019–20	Serie C	19	1	0	0	—		—		19	1
Virtus Verona	2020–21	Serie C	32	0	0	0	—		—		32	0
Career total			70	2	0	0	—		—		70	2
