= Giovanni Di Noia =

Italian footballer

Personal information
- Date of birth: 3 July 1994 (age 32)
- Place of birth: Bari, Italy
- Height: 1.80 m (5 ft 11 in)
- Position: Midfielder

Team information
- Current team: Gubbio
- Number: 47

Youth career
- –2011: Bari
- 2010–2011: → Chieti (loan)

Senior career*
Years	Team	Apps	(Gls)
2011	Bari	0	(0)
2012	Chieti	3	(0)
2012–2014	Pontedera	46	(2)
2014–2018	Bari	19	(0)
2014–2015	→ Matera (loan)	29	(1)
2016–2017	→ Ternana (loan)	31	(4)
2017–2018	→ Cesena (loan)	27	(1)
2018–2021	Chievo	18	(2)
2018–2019	→ Carpi (loan)	22	(2)
2021	→ Perugia (loan)	11	(0)
2021–2022	Perugia	0	(0)
2021–2022	→ Fidelis Andria (loan)	17	(1)
2022	→ Gubbio (loan)	15	(1)
2022–2024	Foggia	53	(3)
2024–2025	Virtus Entella	30	(4)
2025–2026	Trapani	17	(0)
2026	Catania	12	(0)
2026–	Gubbio	1	(0)

International career
2014	Italy U-20	3	(0)
- * Club domestic league appearances and goals as of 22 August 2026

Giovanni Di Noia (born 3 July 1994) is an Italian professional footballer who plays as a midfielder for Serie C Group B club Gubbio.

== Club career ==
He made his professional debut in the Lega Pro for Pontedera on 8 September 2013 in a game against Paganese.

On 7 August 2018, Di Noia signed with Serie A team Chievo for free. After joining on loan to Carpi until 30 June 2019.

On 26 January 2021, he joined Perugia on loan with an obligation to buy. On 28 August 2021, Perugia loaned him to Fidelis Andria. On 15 January 2022, he moved on a new loan to Gubbio.

On 13 July 2022, Di Noia signed a two-year deal with Foggia.

For the 2024–25 season, Di Noia joined Virtus Entella.
