= Giovanni Nuti =

Italian footballer

Personal information
- Date of birth: 6 November 1998 (age 28)
- Place of birth: Gubbio, Italy
- Position: Centre back

Team information
- Current team: Fulgens Foligno

Youth career
- –2016: Gubbio
- 2015–2016: → Genoa (loan)
- 2016: Genoa
- 2016–2017: Chievo

Senior career*
| Years | Team | Apps | (Gls) |
| 2014 | Gubbio | 1 | (0) |
| 2017–2021 | Chievo | 0 | (0) |
| 2017–2018 | → Mosta (loan) | 5 | (0) |
| 2018–2019 | → Gubbio (loan) | 0 | (0) |
| 2019–2020 | → San Roque de Lepe (loan) | 2 | (0) |
| 2020–2021 | → Foligno (loan) | 27 | (1) |
| 2021 | PDHAE | 9 | (0) |
| 2022 | Jeunesse Canach | 1 | (0) |
| 2022–2023 | Sansepolcro | | |
| 2023– | Fulgens Foligno | 10 | (0) |
- * Club domestic league appearances and goals as of 16 November 2024

Giovanni Nuti (born 6 November 1998) is an Italian football player who plays for Serie D club Fulgens Foligno.

== Club career ==
He made his Serie C debut for Gubbio on 13 April 2014 in a game against Paganese.

On 30 August 2019, he was sent on a season-long loan to San Roque de Lepe.
