= Andrea Magrini =

Italian footballer (born 1997)

Personal information
- Date of birth: 26 August 1997 (age 29)
- Place of birth: Forlì, Italy
- Height: 1.90 m (6 ft 3 in)
- Position: Midfielder

Youth career
- –2015: Cesena
- 2015–2016: Chievo
- 2015–2016: → Cesena (loan)

Senior career*
Years	Team	Apps	(Gls)
2016–2020	Chievo	0	(0)
2016–2017	→ Romagna Centro (loan)	37	(1)
2017–2018	→ Ravenna (loan)	31	(1)
2018–2019	→ Pontedera (loan)	26	(0)
2020	→ Carpi (loan)	0	(0)
2020–2021	Como	5	(1)
- * Club domestic league appearances and goals as of 31 January 2021

Andrea Magrini (born 26 August 1997) is an Italian football player.

== Club career ==
He made his Serie C debut for Ravenna on 17 September 2017 in a game against Teramo.

On 31 January 2020, he joined Carpi on loan.

On 5 October 2020 he signed a one-season contract with Como. On 1 February 2021, his contract was terminated by mutual consent.
