= Andrea Isufaj =

Italian footballer (born 1999)

Personal information
- Date of birth: 21 November 1999 (age 26)
- Place of birth: Brixen, Italy
- Height: 1.83 m (6 ft 0 in)
- Position: Forward

Youth career
- Inter Club Bressanone
- –2013: ASV Vahrn
- 2013–2015: SSV Brixen
- 2015–2017: Arezzo
- 2016–2017: → Chievo (loan)
- 2017–2018: Chievo

Senior career*
Years	Team	Apps	(Gls)
2018–2020	Chievo	0	(0)
2018–2019	→ Lucchese (loan)	29	(2)
2020–2021	Paganese	10	(0)
2021–	Ambrosiana	0	(0)
- * Club domestic league appearances and goals as of 30 January 2021

Andrea Isufaj (born 21 November 1999) is an Italian football player of Albanian descent.

== Club career ==
He made his Serie C debut for Lucchese on 16 September 2018 in a game against Arezzo.

On 11 September 2020 he signed a 2-year contract with Paganese. His Paganese contract was terminated by mutual consent on 1 February 2021.

On 10 February 2021, he joined Serie D club Ambrosiana.
