= FC Arzignano Valchiampo =

Italian football club

- Full name: Football Club; Arzignano Valchiampo srl
- Founded: 2011; 15 years ago
- Ground: Tommaso Dal Molin Stadium, Arzignano, Italy
- Capacity: 2,000
- Chairman: Lino Chilese
- Manager: Daniele Di Donato
- League: Serie C Group A
- 2025–26: Serie C Group A, 9th of 20
Home colours	Away colours

Football Club Arzignano Valchiampo is a football club based in Arzignano, Veneto, Italy, that competes in Serie C.

== History ==
The club was founded in 2011 after the merger between U.S.D Chiampo founded in 1963 and U.S.D. G.M. Arzignano. This last club was founded in 2005 with the merger between A.C. Arzignano and U.S.D Garcia Moreno.

The team was promoted to Serie D after the victory with Catania San Pio X in the play-off between the two semi-finalists of Coppa Italia Dilettanti. This was followed by the club winning promotion to Serie C as Serie D league champions in the 2018–19 season, under the guidance of Daniele Di Donato. They were successively relegated back to Serie D after only one season, then winning promotion back to the Italian third tier on their second attempt in 2021–22.

== Colors and badge ==
The team's colors are yellow and light blue.

== Current squad ==
As of 11 September 2026

Note: Flags indicate national team as defined under FIFA eligibility rules; some limited exceptions apply. Players may hold more than one non-FIFA nationality.

No.	Pos.	Nation	Player
1	GK	ITA	Tommaso Vannucchi (on loan from Fiorentina)
2	MF	ITA	Michael Fosu
5	DF	ITA	Elia Campesan
6	MF	ALB	Erald Lakti
7	MF	ITA	Eddy Lanzi
9	FW	ITA	Andrea Mattioli
10	FW	ITA	Jacopo Romio (on loan from Vicenza)
11	MF	ITA	Mattia Penta (on loan from Padova)
13	MF	ITA	Fabio Cariolato
15	DF	ITA	Stefan Gostimirovic
16	MF	ITA	Mirco Moretti
17	MF	ITA	Luigi Castegnaro (on loan from Padova)
19	DF	ITA	Francesco Toniolo

No.	Pos.	Nation	Player
20	FW	ITA	Andrea Preto
21	DF	ITA	Davide Finizio
22	GK	ITA	Filippo Manfrin
23	DF	ITA	Edoardo Bernardi
24	DF	ITA	Francesco Rizzo
26	DF	ITA	Vittorio Gambardella (on loan from Avellino)
27	DF	ITA	Alessandro Nenna
28	MF	SRB	Filip Marković
30	MF	ITA	Christian Gatti
31	DF	ITA	Eros De Santis
32	FW	SMR	Nicola Nanni
57	DF	ITA	Alessio Milillo
75	DF	ITA	Matteo Bassi

=== Out on loan ===
Note: Flags indicate national team as defined under FIFA eligibility rules; some limited exceptions apply. Players may hold more than one non-FIFA nationality.

No.	Pos.	Nation	Player
—	GK	ITA	Riccardo Lotto (at Union Clodiense Chioggia until 30 June 2027)
—	DF	ITA	Noè Jamali (at Rovato until 30 June 2027)
—	MF	ITA	Alessandro Eco (at K-Sport Montecchio until 30 June 2027)

No.	Pos.	Nation	Player
—	MF	ITA	Mattia Signoroni (at Pro Palazzolo until 30 June 2027)
—	FW	ITA	Alberto Basso Ricci (at Brian Lignano until 30 June 2027)
