= 2020–21 AC ChievoVerona season =

Chievo
2020–21 season
- President: Luca Campedelli
- Head coach: Alfredo Aglietti
- Stadium: Stadio Marc'Antonio Bentegodi
- Serie B: 8th (excluded)
- Coppa Italia: Second round
Home colours	Away colours	Third colours

The 2020–21 season was the 92nd season in the existence of AC ChievoVerona and the club's second consecutive in the second division of Italian football. In addition to the domestic league, Chievo participated in this season's edition of the Coppa Italia.

== Players ==
=== First-team squad ===
As of 8 February 2021

Note: Flags indicate national team as defined under FIFA eligibility rules; some limited exceptions apply. Players may hold more than one non-FIFA nationality.

No.	Pos.	Nation	Player
1	GK	ITA	Andrea Seculin
3	DF	SWE	Joseph Colley
5	DF	ITA	Michele Rigione
6	DF	FRA	Maxime Leverbe
7	MF	SVK	Dávid Ivan
8	MF	ITA	Emanuele Zuelli
9	FW	ITA	Michael Fabbro
10	MF	NGR	Joel Obi
11	FW	ITA	Antonio Di Gaudio
12	GK	ITA	Michele Bragantini
13	DF	ITA	Francesco Renzetti
14	MF	ITA	Luca Palmiero (on loan from Napoli)
15	DF	FIN	Sauli Väisänen
16	MF	ITA	Luca Garritano
17	MF	ITA	Emanuele Giaccherini
18	FW	ITA	Luigi Canotto
20	FW	MNE	Sergej Grubač

No.	Pos.	Nation	Player
21	DF	SLO	Daniel Pavlev
23	FW	SRB	Filip Đorđević
24	MF	ITA	Mattia Viviani
26	MF	ITA	Massimo Bertagnoli
27	DF	ITA	Matteo Cotali
32	DF	ROU	Vasile Mogoș
33	GK	CRO	Adrian Šemper
39	DF	SUI	Marin Cavar
40	DF	GHA	Elimelech Enyan
41	FW	TUN	Nabil Makni
43	FW	ITA	Filippo Tuzzo
89	DF	FRA	Guillaume Gigliotti
93	FW	ITA	Francesco Margiotta
95	MF	ITA	Luca Munaretti
98	FW	ITA	Manuel De Luca
99	MF	ITA	Amato Ciciretti (on loan from Napoli)

=== Other players under contract ===
As of 10 September 2020

Note: Flags indicate national team as defined under FIFA eligibility rules; some limited exceptions apply. Players may hold more than one non-FIFA nationality.

No.	Pos.	Nation	Player
—	GK	ITA	Lorenzo Sarini

=== On loan ===
As of 29 January 2021

Note: Flags indicate national team as defined under FIFA eligibility rules; some limited exceptions apply. Players may hold more than one non-FIFA nationality.

No.	Pos.	Nation	Player
—	GK	ITA	Alessandro Confente (at Catania until 30 June 2021)
—	GK	ITA	Filippo Pavoni (at Legnago Salus until 30 June 2021)
—	DF	ITA	Alberto Drudi (at Boca Gibraltar until 30 June 2021)
—	DF	ITA	Daniele Grieco (at Boca Gibraltar until 30 June 2021)
—	DF	ITA	Giovanni Nuti (at Foligno until 30 June 2021)
—	DF	ITA	Genny Rondinella (at Pistoiese until 30 June 2021)
—	MF	ITA	Giovanni Di Noia (at Perugia until 30 June 2021, obligation to buy)

No.	Pos.	Nation	Player
—	MF	POR	Nuno Pina (at Grasshoppers until 30 June 2021)
—	MF	ITA	Enrico Manconi (at Ambrosiana until 30 June 2021)
—	MF	SWE	Jonathan Morsay (at Dinamo București until 30 June 2021)
—	FW	ITA	Manuel Pucciarelli (at Dibba Al-Fujairah until 30 June 2021)
—	FW	ESP	Alejandro Rodríguez (at Virtus Entella until 30 June 2021)
—	FW	ITA	Pietro Rovaglia (at Pistoiese until 30 June 2021)

== Competitions ==
=== Overview ===
Competition	First match	Last match	Starting round	Final position	Record							
Competition	First match	Last match	Starting round	Final position	Pld	W	D	L	GF	GA	GD	Win %
Serie B	26 September 2020	10 May 2021	Matchday 1	8th	38	14	14	10	50	37	+13	36.84
Serie B promotion play-offs	13 May 2021		Preliminary round	Preliminary round	1	0	0	1	2	3	−1	0.00
Coppa Italia	30 September 2020		Second round	Second round	1	0	1	0	1	1	+0	0.00
Total					40	14	15	11	53	41	+12	35.00

Source: Soccerway

=== Serie B ===
==== League table ====
Pos	Team	Pld	W	D	L	GF	GA	GD	Pts	Promotion, qualification or relegation
6	Cittadella	38	15	12	11	48	35	+13	57	Qualification for promotion play-offs preliminary round
7	Brescia	38	15	11	12	61	53	+8	56 (Note: Head-to-head points: Brescia 9, Chievo 5, SPAL 2.)	Qualification for promotion play-offs preliminary round
8	Chievo (D, R)	38	14	14	10	50	37	+13	56	Bankruptcy
9	SPAL	38	14	14	10	44	42	+2	56	
10	Frosinone	38	12	14	12	38	42	−4	50 (Note: Frosinone finished ahead of Reggina on head-to-head points: Frosinone 1–1 Reggina, Reggina 0–4 Frosinone.)	

Source: Lega Serie B (in Italian), Soccerway (in English)
Rules for classification: 1) Points; 2) Head-to-head points; 3) Head-to-head goal difference; 4) Goal difference; 5) Goals scored; 6) Draw.
(D) Disqualified; (R) Relegated

==== Results summary ====
Overall								Home						Away					
Pld	W	D	L	GF	GA	GD	Pts	W	D	L	GF	GA	GD	W	D	L	GF	GA	GD
38	14	14	10	50	37	+13	56	10	5	4	29	14	+15	4	9	6	21	23	−2

Source: Serie B

==== Results by round ====
Round	1	2	3	4	5	6	7	8	9	10	11	12	13	14	15	16	17	18	19	20	21	22	23	24	25	26	27	28	29	30	31	32	33	34	35	36	37	38
Ground	A	H	A	H	A	H	A	H	A	H	A	H	A	H	A	H	A	A	H	H	A	H	A	H	A	H	H	A	H	A	H	H	A	A	A	H	A	H
Result	D	L	W	W	W	W	D	L	L	W	D	D	D	D	W	W	D	D	W	W	D	W	L	L	L	W	L	L	D	D	D	W	L	D	L	D	W	W
Position	10	14	8	5	5	2	2	6	8	8	8	9	9	9	9	9	9	7	6	3	3	2	2	5	7	6	6	7	7	8	8	8	8	8	8	7	7	8

Updated to match(es) played on 10 May 2021. Source: Serie B
A = Away; H = Home; W = Win; D = Draw; L = Loss

==== Matches ====
The league fixtures were announced on 9 September 2020.

26 September 2020 1	Pescara	0–0	Chievo	Pescara
14:00 CET		Report	Palmiero (yellow card) 82'	Stadium: Stadio Adriatico – Giovanni Cornacchia; Attendance: 1,000; Referee: Antonio Rapuano

3 October 2020 2	Chievo	1–2	Salernitana	Verona
14:15 CET	Mogoș (yellow card) 20' (goal) 24'; Rigione (yellow card) 89'; Obi (yellow card) 90+5' (red card) 90+5'	Report	López (yellow card) 20'; Tutino 34'; Đurić 64'; Aya (yellow card) 89'	Stadium: Stadio Marcantonio Bentegodi; Attendance: 1,000; Referee: Luca Massimi

17 October 2020 3	Reggiana	0–1	Chievo	Reggio nell'Emilia
14:00 CET	Gyamfi (yellow card) 25'; Muratore (yellow card) 65'; Kirwan (yellow card) 82'; Martinelli (yellow card) 90+1'	Report	Garritano 25' (yellow card) 37'; Šemper (yellow card) 87'; Mogoș (yellow card) 90+2'	Stadium: Mapei Stadium – Città del Tricolore; Attendance: 998; Referee: Daniele Chiffi

20 October 2020 4	Chievo	1–0	Brescia	Verona
21:00 CET	Garritano 35'; De Luca (yellow card) 76'	Report	Sabelli (yellow card) 44'; Papetti (yellow card) 84'	Stadium: Stadio Marcantonio Bentegodi; Attendance: 1,000; Referee: Valerio Marini

24 October 2020 5	Monza	1–2	Chievo	Monza
14:00 CET	Dany Mota (yellow card) 26'; Boateng 29' (pen.); Barillà (yellow card) 35' (yellow-red card) 43'	Report	Đorđević 49' 64'; Viviani (red card) 83'	Stadium: U-Power Stadium; Attendance: 670; Referee: Rosario Abisso

31 October 2020 6	Chievo	2–0	Cosenza	Verona
16:00 CET	Leverbe 42' (pen.) (yellow card) 76'; Palmiero (yellow card) 79'; Garritano 84'	Report	Sciaudone (yellow card) 41'; Kone (yellow card) 61'; Borrelli (yellow card) 86'; Bahlouli (yellow card) 90+5'	Stadium: Stadio Marcantonio Bentegodi; Attendance: 0 Referee: Gianluca Manganiello

7 November 2020 7	Pordenone	1–1	Chievo	Lignano Sabbiadoro
14:00 CET	Butić (yellow card) 26'; Calò (yellow card) 32'; Camporese (yellow card) 71'; Bassoli (yellow card) 73'; Musiolik 90+2'	Report	Viviani (yellow card) 44'; Leverbe (yellow card) 53'; Fabbro 61'	Stadium: Stadio Guido Teghil; Attendance: 0 Referee: Alessandro Prontera

27 November 2020 9	Chievo	1–2	Chievo	Verona
21:00 CET	Garritano 22'; Fabbro (yellow card) 29'; Cotali (yellow card) 36'	Report	Stępiński 20'; Henderson (yellow card) 32'; Calderoni (yellow card) 49'; Paganini (yellow card) 66'; Lucioni (yellow card) 77'; Falco 90+3'	Stadium: Stadio Marcantonio Bentegodi; Attendance: 0 Referee: Simone Sozza

5 December 2020 10	Frosinone	3–2	Chievo	Frosinone
14:00 CET	Rohdén (yellow card) 28'; Ciano 39'; Novakovich 52' 79'; Zampano (yellow card) 90+2'	Report	Canotto 18' (yellow card) 90+4'; Margiotta 32'	Stadium: Stadio Benito Stirpe; Attendance: 0 Referee: Piero Giacomelli

11 December 2020 11	Chievo	3–0	Reggina	Verona
21:00 CET	Margiotta 25' 57'; Palmiero (yellow card) 37'; Cotali (yellow card) 69' (yellow-red card) 90+2'; Rigione 76'	Report	Bellomo (yellow card) 29'; Del Prato (yellow card) 45+1'; Lafferty (yellow card) 56'; Rivas (yellow card) 63'	Stadium: Stadio Marcantonio Bentegodi; Attendance: 0 Referee: Giovanni Ayroldi

15 December 2020 12	SPAL	0–0	Chievo	Ferrara
21:00 CET	Gabriel Espeto (yellow card) 9' (yellow-red card) 42'; Tomović (yellow card) 32'	Report	Obi (yellow card) 5'; Canotto (yellow card) 61'	Stadium: Stadio Paolo Mazza; Attendance: 0 Referee: Marco Guida

19 December 2020 13	Chievo	1–1	Empoli	Verona
14:00 CET	Obi 18'; Renzetti (yellow card) 22' (yellow-red card) 69'; Margiotta (yellow card) 84'	Report	La Mantia 60'	Stadium: Stadio Marcantonio Bentegodi; Attendance: 0 Referee: Livio Marinelli

22 December 2020 14	Pisa	2–2	Chievo	Pisa
19:00 CET	Mazzitelli (yellow card) 7' (goal) 49'; Gucher 16'; Siega (yellow card) 76' (yellow-red card) 81'	Report	Cotali (yellow card) 40'; Obi (yellow card) 61'; Đorđević 76'; Ciciretti 90'	Stadium: Arena Garibaldi – Stadio Romeo Anconetani; Attendance: 0 Referee: Antonio Santoro

30 December 2020 16	Chievo	1–1	Venezia	Verona
21:00 CET	Palmiero (yellow card) 25'; Gigliotti 90+3'	Report	Forte 10'; Črnigoj (yellow card) 35'; Svoboda (yellow card) 74'; Bocalon (yellow card) 90+3'	Stadium: Stadio Marcantonio Bentegodi; Attendance: 0 Referee: Massimiliano Irrati

4 January 2021 17	Cremonese	0–2	Chievo	Cremona
17:00 CET	Zaccagno (yellow card) 21'; Valzania (yellow card) 34'; Castagnetti (yellow card) 72'	Report	Giaccherini 22' (pen.); Palmiero (yellow card) 34'; Bertagnoli 81' (yellow card) 82'	Stadium: Stadio Giovanni Zini; Attendance: 0 Referee: Alessandro Prontera

15 January 2021 18	Chievo	2–1	Virtus Entella	Verona
18:00 CET	Ciciretti 49'; De Luca 53'	Report	Koutsoupias (yellow card) 40'; Brunori 76'; Chiosa (yellow card) 90+2'	Stadium: Stadio Marcantonio Bentegodi; Attendance: 0 Referee: Daniele Paterna

19 January 2021 8	Vicenza	1–1	Chievo	Vicenza
18:00 CET	Bruscagin (yellow card) 38'; Gori 45'; Jallow (yellow card) 53'; Pasini (yellow card) 84'; Marotta (yellow card) 90+3'	Report	Palmiero (yellow card) 44'; Margiotta 74'	Stadium: Stadio Romeo Menti; Attendance: 0 Referee: Alessandro Prontera

23 January 2021 19	Ascoli	0–0	Chievo	Ascoli Piceno
13:00 CET	Gerbo (yellow card) 21'; Cangiano (yellow card) 50'; Eramo (yellow card) 66'	Report	Gigliotti (yellow card) 30'; Obi (yellow card) 41'; Fabbro (yellow card) 59'	Stadium: Stadio Cino e Lillo Del Duca; Attendance: 0 Referee: Andrea Rapuano

27 January 2021 15	Chievo	2–1	Cittadella	Verona
18:00 CET	De Luca 31' (yellow card) 58'; Bertagnoli 74'	Report	Vita (yellow card) 28'; Benedetti (yellow card) 33'; Adorni (yellow card) 77'; Pavan 80'; Camigliano (yellow card) 90+3'; Ghiringhelli (yellow card) 90+4'	Stadium: Stadio Marcantonio Bentegodi; Attendance: 0 Referee: Eugenio Abbattista

31 January 2021 20	Chievo	3–1	Pescara	Verona
14:00 CET	Palmiero 5'; Mogoș 46'; Viviani (yellow card) 74'; De Luca 76'	Report	Maistro 24'; Bocchetti (yellow card) 79'	Stadium: Stadio Marcantonio Bentegodi; Attendance: 0 Referee: Antonio Santoro

6 February 2021 21	Salernitana	1–1	Chievo	Salerno
14:00 CET	Tutino 23'; Coulibaly (yellow card) 41'; Belec (yellow card) 51'; Gyömbér (yellow card) 79'	Report	De Luca 50'; Viviani (yellow card) 90+1'	Stadium: Stadio Arechi; Attendance: 0 Referee: Simone Sozza

10 February 2021 22	Chievo	1–0	Reggiana	Verona
21:00 CET	Mogoș (yellow card) 84'; Obi 90+1'	Report	Zamparo (yellow card) 66'	Stadium: Stadio Marcantonio Bentegodi; Attendance: 0 Referee: Valerio Marini

14 February 2021 23	Brescia	1–0	Chievo	Brescia
18:00 CET	Ayé 35'; Pajač (yellow card) 71'	Report	Cotali (yellow card) 76'; Renzetti (yellow card) 90+1'	Stadium: Stadio Mario Rigamonti; Attendance: 0 Referee: Antonio Di Martino

20 February 2021 24	Chievo	0–1	Monza	Verona
16:00 CET	Gigliotti (red card) 62'; Leverbe (yellow card) 73'; Rigione (yellow card) 90+4'	Report	Bellusci (yellow card) 29'; D'Alessandro (yellow card) 47'; Balotelli 60'; Diaw (yellow card) 90+4'	Stadium: Stadio Marcantonio Bentegodi; Attendance: 0 Referee: Juan Luca Sacchi

27 February 2021 25	Cosenza	1–0	Chievo	Cosenza
14:00 CET	Gliozzi 11'; Corsi (yellow card) 53'; Sciaudone (yellow card) 79'	Report		Stadium: Stadio San Vito-Gigi Marulla; Attendance: 0 Referee: Maurizio Mariani

2 March 2021 26	Chievo	3–0	Pordenone	Verona
CET (UTC+1)				Stadium: Stadio Marcantonio Bentegodi

8 March 2021 27	Chievo	1–2	Vicenza	Verona
CET (UTC+1)				Stadium: Stadio Marcantonio Bentegodi

13 March 2021 28	Lecce	4–2	Chievo	Lecce
CET (UTC+1)				Stadium: Stadio Via del Mare

16 March 2021 29	Chievo	0–0	Frosinone	Verona
CET (UTC+1)				Stadium: Stadio Marcantonio Bentegodi

21 March 2021 30	Reggina	1–1	Chievo	Reggio Calabria
CET (UTC+1)				Stadium: Stadio Oreste Granillo

2 April 2021 31	Chievo	1–1	SPAL	Verona
CEST (UTC+2)				Stadium: Stadio Marcantonio Bentegodi

12 April 2021 33	Chievo	2–0	Pisa	Verona
CEST (UTC+2)				Stadium: Stadio Marcantonio Bentegodi

17 April 2021 34	Cittadella	1–0	Chievo	Cittadella
CEST (UTC+2)				Stadium: Stadio Pier Cesare Tombolato

27 April 2021 32	Empoli	2–2	Chievo	Empoli
CEST (UTC+2)				Stadium: Stadio Carlo Castellani

1 May 2021 35	Venezia	3–1	Chievo	Venice
14:00 CEST (UTC+2)				Stadium: Stadio Pier Luigi Penzo

4 May 2021 36	Chievo	1–1	Cremonese	Verona
14:00 CEST (UTC+2)				Stadium: Stadio Marcantonio Bentegodi

7 May 2021 37	Virtus Entella	1–3	Chievo	Chiavari
14:00 CEST (UTC+2)				Stadium: Stadio Comunale

10 May 2021 38	Chievo	3–0	Ascoli	Verona
14:00 CEST (UTC+2)				Stadium: Stadio Marcantonio Bentegodi

==== Promotion play-offs ====
13 May 2021 Preliminary round	Venezia	3–2 (a.e.t.)	Chievo	Venice
21:00 CEST (UTC+2)	Bertagnoli 60' (o.g.); Maleh 107'; Johnsen 116'	Report	Garritano 10' (pen.); Mogoș 104' (pen.)	Stadium: Stadio Pier Luigi Penzo; Attendance: 0 Referee: Simone Sozza

=== Coppa Italia ===
30 September 2020 Second Round	Chievo	1–1 (6–7 p)	Catanzaro	Verona
18:00 CET	Fabbro (yellow card) 28'; De Luca 43'; Cotali (yellow card) 79' (yellow-red card) 117'	Report	Riggio (yellow card) 18' (yellow-red card) 78'; Martinelli 60'	Stadium: Stadio Marcantonio Bentegodi; Attendance: 0 Referee: Francesco Meraviglia
	Penalties
	Palmiero (penalty missed); De Luca (penalty scored); Morsay (penalty scored); Grubac (penalty scored); Mogoș (penalty scored); Rigione (penalty scored); Zuelli (penalty scored); Illanes (penalty missed)		(penalty scored) Carlini; (penalty scored) Curiale; (penalty missed) Bayeye; (penalty scored) Martinelli; (penalty scored) Pinna; (penalty scored) Garufo; (penalty scored) Casoli; (penalty scored) Verna
