= Michele Rigione =

Italian footballer (born 1991)

Personal information
- Date of birth: 7 March 1991 (age 35)
- Place of birth: Naples, Italy
- Height: 1.85 m (6 ft 1 in)
- Position: Centre-back

Team information
- Current team: Vis Pesaro
- Number: 28

Youth career
- 2001–2007: Chievo
- 2007–2010: Inter

Senior career*
Years	Team	Apps	(Gls)
2010–2013	Inter	0	(0)
2010–2011	→ Foggia (loan)	24	(1)
2011–2012	→ Cremonese (loan)	18	(1)
2012–2013	→ Grosseto (loan)	10	(0)
2013–2015	Catanzaro	62	(3)
2015	Teramo	0	(0)
2015–2016	Lanciano	28	(1)
2016–2017	Cesena	21	(2)
2017–2021	Chievo	45	(4)
2017–2018	→ Cesena (loan)	13	(1)
2018	→ Ternana (loan)	14	(0)
2019	→ Novara (loan)	9	(0)
2021–2023	Cosenza	65	(3)
2023–2026	Avellino	55	(4)
2026	Trento	5	(0)
2026–	Vis Pesaro	0	(0)

International career
2006–2007	Italy U16	15	(0)
2007–2008	Italy U17	6	(0)
2009	Italy U18	2	(0)
2008–2009	Italy U19	2	(0)
2010–2011	Italy U20	3	(0)
- * Club domestic league appearances and goals as of 29 April 2026

Michele Rigione (born 7 March 1991) is an Italian professional footballer who plays as a centre-back for Serie C Group B club Vis Pesaro.

== Club career ==
=== Chievo and Inter ===
Born in Naples, Campania, Rigione had played for Veneto club Chievo since 2001. In August 2007 he joined Inter's under-17 team on loan for €205,000 with an option to co-own the player, and made his debut for Inter's reserves – Primavera in February 2008. He also played 4 times for the first team in club friendlies in 2008–09 and 2009–10 season. In June 2008 he was signed in a co-ownership deal for €350,000.

On 21 July 2010, he was loaned to Lega Pro Prima Divisione club Foggia, as a replacement of departed defenders likes Lorenzo Burzigotti. He became a starting centre-back since round 5 (except round 6), partnering with Simone Romagnoli, Andrea Iozzia or Andrea Torta. He also played 5 matches at 2010–11 Coppa Italia Lega Pro, except the first match as unused bench.

On 22 June 2011 Inter bought the remain rights of Rigione for €500,000 (made Inter registered an additional €150,000 financial cost) and on the same day Chievo also acquired Rincón and youth player Davide Tonani for a nominal fee. Additionally Marco Andreolli returned to Chievo also for €500,000, making the deals were pure player swap.

Rigione went on loan to two more clubs (Cremonese in Lega Pro 1st Division along with Bocalon and Grosseto in Serie B along with Donati) until he was released by Inter on 30 June 2013 as a free agent.

=== Catanzaro ===
In July 2013 he was signed by Catanzaro on a 3-year contract.

On 23 April 2015, Rigione terminated his contract at Catanzaro by a mutual consent, leaving him as a free agent.

=== Teramo & Lanciano ===
In July 2015 he joined Teramo. However, the club was expelled from 2015–16 Serie B due to a match fixing scandal. On 31 August he joined another Serie B club Lanciano.

=== Cesena ===
On 21 July 2016 Rigione was signed by Cesena on a free transfer, signing a 2-year deal.

=== Chievo ===
On 29 June 2017, 1 day before the end of Cesena and Chievo's financial year, Rigione, Garritano, Rodríguez and Daniele Grieco of Cesnea was sold to Chievo for Kupisz, Filippo Zambelli, Pietro Borgogna, Lorenzo Placidi and Carloalberto Tosi. Additionally, Lamin Jallow moved to Cesena on a temporary deal, with an option to purchase at the end of 2017–18 season.

However, on 30 August 2017 Rigione returned to Cesena on loan. On 10 January 2018 he was signed by fellow Serie B club Ternana on another loan.

At the end of 2017–18 season, Cesena was bankrupted, while Rigione failed to find a team for 2018–19 season. He was registered as a youth product of Chievo for the Homegrown Player Rule.

==== Novara (loan) ====
On 30 January 2019, Rigione joined to Novara on loan until 30 June 2019.

=== Cosenza ===
On 13 August 2021, he signed a two-year contract with Cosenza.

=== Avellino ===
On 12 August 2023, Rigione moved to Avellino on a three-year deal. The contract with Avellino was terminated by mutual consent on 2 February 2026.

== Career statistics ==
As of match played on 25 May 2023

Club statistics
Club	Season	League			National Cup		Other		Total	
Club	Season	Division	Apps	Goals	Apps	Goals	Apps	Goals	Apps	Goals
Foggia (loan)	2010–11	Lega Pro Prima Divisione	24	1	0	0	—		24	1
Cremonese (loan)	2011–12	Lega Pro Prima Divisione	18	1	0	0	2 (Note: Appearances in the 2011–12 Lega Pro Prima Divisione Play-offs)	0	20	1
Grosseto (loan)	2012–13	Serie B	10	0	0	0	—		10	0
Catanzaro	2013–14	Lega Pro Prima Divisione	28	0	0	0	2 (Note: One appearance in the 2013–14 Lega Pro Prima Divisione Play-offs and one appearance in the Coppa Italia Lega Pro)	0	30	0
Catanzaro	2014–15	Lega Pro	34	3	2	0	—		36	3
Catanzaro	Totals		62	3	2	0	2	0	66	3
Teramo	2015–16	Lega Pro	0	0	1	0	—		1	0
Virtus Lanciano	2015–16	Serie B	28	1	0	0	1 (Note: Appearance in the 2015–16 Serie B Relegation play-out)	0	29	1
Cesena	2016–17	Serie B	21	2	5	0	—		26	2
Cesena (loan)	2017–18	Serie B	13	1	0	0	—		13	1
Ternana (loan)	2017–18	Serie B	14	0	0	0	—		14	0
Novara (loan)	2018–19	Serie C	9	0	0	0	—		9	0
Chievo	2019–20	Serie B	17	3	2	0	3 (Note: Appearances in the 2019–20 Serie B Promotion play-offs)	0	22	3
Chievo	2020–21	Serie B	28	1	1	0	1 (Note: Appearance in the 2020–21 Serie B#Promotion play-offs)	0	30	1
Chievo	Totals		45	4	3	0	4	0	52	4
Cosenza	2021–22	Serie B	34	1	0	0	2 (Note: Appearances in the 2021–22 Serie B#Relegation play-out)	0	36	1
Cosenza	2022–23	Serie B	27	2	1	0	1	0	29	2
Cosenza	Totals		61	3	1	0	3	0	65	3
Career totals			305	16	12	0	12	0	329	15

== International career ==
Rigione played twice for Italy U19 team, both were friendlies. He also capped twice at 2008 UEFA European Under-17 Football Championship qualification. He received his first call-up from Italy U20, a feeder team of U21, for 2010–11 Four Nations Tournament in November.

According to Internazionale, Rigione was the captain of Italy national under-17 football team.
