= Luca Garritano =

Italian footballer (born 1994)

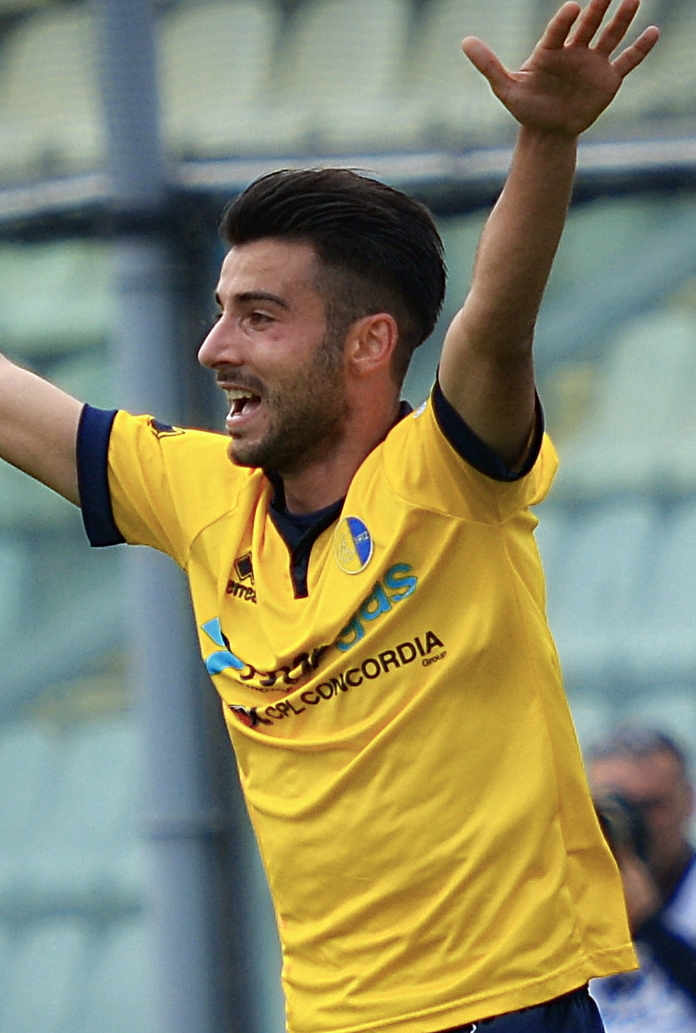
- Garritano in 2015

Personal information
- Date of birth: 11 February 1994 (age 32)
- Place of birth: Cosenza, Italy
- Height: 1.72 m (5 ft 8 in)
- Positions: Midfielder; left winger

Team information
- Current team: Monopoli
- Number: 61

Youth career
- 2008–2011: Inter
- 2011–2012: Cesena
- 2011–2012: → Inter (loan)

Senior career*
Years	Team	Apps	(Gls)
2012–2017	Cesena	98	(8)
2012–2013	→ Inter (loan)	3	(0)
2015	→ Modena (loan)	21	(3)
2017–2021	Chievo	80	(11)
2018	→ Carpi (loan)	19	(0)
2018–2019	→ Cosenza (loan)	26	(3)
2021–2025	Frosinone	92	(5)
2025–2026	Cosenza	38	(4)
2026–	Monopoli	1	(1)

International career^{‡}
2009–2010	Italy U16	2	(2)
2011–2012	Italy U18	7	(3)
2012–2013	Italy U19	7	(1)
2013–2015	Italy U20	9	(4)
2015–2017	Italy U21	12	(0)
- * Club domestic league appearances and goals as of 29 August 2026 ‡ National team caps and goals as of 27 June 2017

Luca Garritano (born 11 February 1994) is an Italian professional footballer who plays as a midfielder or left winger for Serie C Group C club Monopoli.

== Club career ==
=== Inter ===
Born in Cosenza, Calabria, southern Italy, Garritano played for Inter Milan from their giovanissimi nazionali under-15 team in 2008–09 season to their allievi nazionali U17 team in 2010–11 season.

=== Cesena ===
On 30 June–1 July 2011 Garritano (50% registration rights for €700,000) along with Luca Caldirola (50% registration rights for €2.5M) were left for Cesena in co-ownership deals as part of €10.5 million deal to sign Yuto Nagatomo from Cesena. Garritano signed a 3-year contract, the maximum length an under-18 player could sign. On 1 July 2011 Garritano returned to Inter on a temporary deal, for the U18 team. Garritano scored 10 league goals in the group stage. Garritano also played for Inter U19 team 8 times. After winning the league title for U18 team, Garritano was included in the U19 squad for the playoffs round of Campionato Nazionale Primavera. He played twice, in semi-finals replacing suspended Marko Livaja and again in the final as a substitute for Daniel Bessa. In June 2012 the co-ownership deal between Inter and Cesena was renewed and Garritano remained in Inter U19 team for 2012–13 season.

Garritano made his first team debut on 4 October 2012 in 2012–13 UEFA Europa League. Garritano made his debut in Serie A on 21 April in San Siro verse Parma.

In June 2013 the co-ownership of Garritano was renewed again. In July 2013 Garritano joined the pre-season camp of Cesena. Circa his graduation from the youth system his also signed a new professional contract with Cesena.

Garritano made 25 appearances for Cesena in 2013–14 Serie B; he also played 3 times in for the winner of the promotion playoffs. In June 2014 the co-ownership was renewed again. However, he only played 6 times in 2014–15 Serie A; on 9 January 2015 he was signed by Serie B club Modena in a temporary deal.

In June 2015 Cesena acquired the remaining 50% registration rights of Garritano from Inter, for another €50,000 fee. Inter, their directors Piero Ausilio and Rinaldo Ghelfi were also fined by the Italian Football Federation in July 2016, for the price tags of Caldirola, Garritano and Nagatomo, for a total fine of €90,000. It was accused by the prosecutor that the price tags were inflated, in order to boost the club's financial positions of 2010–11 and 2011–12 financial year.

=== Chievo ===
On 29 June 2017, one day before the end of Cesena and Chievo's financial year, Garritano, Rodríguez, Rigione and Daniele Grieco of Cesena were sold to Chievo for Kupisz, Filippo Zambelli, Pietro Borgogna, Lorenzo Placidi and Carloalberto Tosi to Cesena. Additionally, Lamin Jallow moved to Cesena on a temporary deal, with an option to purchase at the end of 2017–18 season. Chievo bought the 4 players for a total of €15 million fee. However, it was counter-weighed by Cesena bought the 5 players for a total of €14 million transfer fee. The profit did benefited Cesena in 2016–17 financial year, but also created a heavy burden in terms of amortization on the acquisition costs for 2017–18 financial year and beyond.

In July 2018 Garritano returned to Chievo after the expiry of the loan. In the same month Cesena was declared bankrupted as well as Chievo was accused of false accounting on swap deals such as Garritano's deal.

On 17 August 2018, Garritano joined to Serie B side Cosenza on loan until 30 June 2019.

=== Frosinone ===
On 8 July 2021, he signed a three-year contract with Frosinone.

=== Return to Cosenza ===
On 31 January 2025, Garritano returned to Cosenza on a one-and-a-half-year contract.

== Career statistics ==
As of 1 March 2023

Club statistics
Club	Season	League			Cup		League Cup		Other		Total	
Club	Season	Division	Apps	Goals	Apps	Goals	Apps	Goals	Apps	Goals	Apps	Goals
Cesena	2012–13	Serie B	0	0	0	0	0	0	0	0	0	0
Cesena	2013–14	Serie B	25	2	2	1	0	0	0	0	27	3
Cesena	2014–15	Serie A	6	0	0	0	0	0	0	0	6	0
Cesena	2015–16	Serie B	29	3	1	0	0	0	0	0	30	3
Cesena	2016–17	Serie B	38	3	5	1	0	0	0	0	43	4
Cesena	Total		98	8	8	2	0	0	0	0	106	10
Inter Milan (loan)	2012–13	Serie A	3	0	0	0	0	0	2 (Note: Appearances in the UEFA Europa League)	0	5	0
Modena (loan)	2014–15	Serie B	21	3	0	0	0	0	2 (Note: Appearances in the 2014–15 Relegation play-offs)	2	23	5
Chievo	2017–18	Serie A	11	0	2	0	0	0	0	0	13	0
Chievo	2018–19	Serie A	0	0	0	0	0	0	0	0	0	0
Chievo	2019–20	Serie B	31	3	1	0	0	0	3 (Note: Appearances in the 2019–20 Promotion play-offs)	1	35	4
Chievo	2020–21	Serie B	38	8	1	0	0	0	1 (Note: Appearance in the 2020–21 Promotion play-offs)	1	40	9
Chievo	Total		80	11	4	0	0	0	4	2	88	13
Carpi (loan)	2017–18	Serie B	19	0	0	0	0	0	0	0	19	0
Cosenza (loan)	2018–19	Serie B	26	3	0	0	0	0	0	0	26	3
Frosinone	2021–22	Serie B	32	2	0	0	0	0	0	0	32	2
Frosinone	2022–23	Serie B	26	2	1	0	0	0	0	0	27	2
Frosinone	Total		58	4	1	0	0	0	0	0	59	4
Career totals			305	29	13	2	0	0	8	4	326	35

== International career ==
Garritano was a member of the Italy U19 team at the 2013 UEFA European Under-19 Football Championship qualification and elite qualification, in which he made 4 appearances. He also played 3 friendlies for the U19 team, including the first match of the season, against Croatia U19.

On 8 October 2015, he made his debut with the Italy U21 squad, in a 3–0 win against Slovenia.

In June 2017, he was included in the Italy under-21 squad for the 2017 UEFA European Under-21 Championship by manager Luigi Di Biagio. He only played once, coming on as a substitute for former Inter teammate Marco Benassi in Italy's 3–1 defeat to Spain in the semi-finals of the competition on 27 June.

== Honours ==
Inter U19

- Campionato Nazionale Primavera: 2012

Inter U18

- Campionato Nazionale Dante Berretti (wildcard group): 2012
