= 2020–21 LR Vicenza season =

Vicenza
2020–21 season
- Manager: Domenico Di Carlo
- Stadium: Stadio Romeo Menti
- Serie B: 12th
- Coppa Italia: Third round
- Biggest win: Brescia 0–3 Vicenza

In the 2020–21 season, LR Vicenza (until 9 February 2021 was named LR Vicenza Virtus) returned to Serie B after spending three seasons in the third division.

== Transfers ==
=== In ===
| Pos. | Player | Transferred from | Fee | Date | Source |
|---|---|---|---|---|---|
| FW | (Italy) Gabriele Gori | (Italy) Fiorentina | Loan | 1 September 2020 | |
| DF | (Italy) Mario Ierardi | (Italy) Südtirol | | 1 September 2020 | |
| FW | (The Gambia) Lamin Jallow | (Italy) Salernitana | | 30 September 2020 | |
| FW | (Italy) Samuele Longo | (Italy) Internazionale | | 5 October 2020 | |
| DF | (Argentina) Nahuel Valentini | (Italy) Padova | Loan | 21 January 2021 | |
| FW | (Italy) Davide Lanzafame | (Turkey) Adana Demirspor | Free | 1 February 2021 | |

=== Out ===
| Pos. | Player | Transferred to | Fee | Date | Source |
|---|---|---|---|---|---|
| FW | (Italy) Simone Guerra | (Italy) Feralpisalò | Free | 13 January 2021 | |
| FW | (Italy) Alessandro Marotta | (Italy) Juve Stabia | Free | 1 February 2021 | |

== Pre-season and friendlies ==
| 29 August 2020 | Udinese | 3–2 | Vicenza | Manzano |
| 19:00 | | | | Stadium: Stadio Comunale Giuseppe Morigi |

| 4 September 2020 | Lazio | 3–2 | Vicenza |

| 9 September 2020 | Milan | 5–1 | Vicenza |

| 12 September 2020 | Vicenza | 1–1 | Monza |

| 18 September 2020 | Vicenza | 1–0 | Südtirol |

| 19 September 2020 | Vicenza | 4–3 | Legnago Salus |

== Competitions ==
=== Overall record ===
| Competition | First match | Last match | Starting round | Final position | Record | | | | | | | |
| Competition | First match | Last match | Starting round | Final position | Pld | W | D | L | GF | GA | GD | Win % |
|---|---|---|---|---|---|---|---|---|---|---|---|---|
| Serie B | 26 September 2020 | 10 May 2021 | Matchday 1 | 12th | 38 | 11 | 15 | 12 | 48 | 53 | −5 | 28.95 |
| Coppa Italia | 30 September 2020 | 28 October 2020 | Second round | Third round | 2 | 1 | 0 | 1 | 4 | 5 | −1 | 50.00 |
| Total | | | | | 40 | 12 | 15 | 13 | 52 | 58 | −6 | 30.00 |

Source: Competitions

=== Serie B ===
==== League table ====
| Pos | Team | Pld | W | D | L | GF | GA | GD | Pts |
|---|---|---|---|---|---|---|---|---|---|
| 10 | Frosinone | 38 | 12 | 14 | 12 | 38 | 42 | −4 | 50 (Note: Frosinone finished ahead of Reggina on head-to-head points: Frosinone 1–1 Reggina, Reggina 0–4 Frosinone.) |
| 11 | Reggina | 38 | 12 | 14 | 12 | 42 | 45 | −3 | 50 |
| 12 | Vicenza | 38 | 11 | 15 | 12 | 48 | 53 | −5 | 48 (Note: Head-to-head points: Vicenza 8, Cremonese 4, Pisa 3.) |
| 13 | Cremonese | 38 | 12 | 12 | 14 | 46 | 44 | +2 | 48 |
| 14 | Pisa | 38 | 11 | 15 | 12 | 54 | 59 | −5 | 48 |

Source: Lega Serie B (in Italian), Soccerway (in English)
Rules for classification: 1) Points; 2) Head-to-head points; 3) Head-to-head goal difference; 4) Goal difference; 5) Goals scored; 6) Draw.

==== Results summary ====
| Overall | | | | | | | | Home | | | | | | Away | | | | | |
| Pld | W | D | L | GF | GA | GD | Pts | W | D | L | GF | GA | GD | W | D | L | GF | GA | GD |
|---|---|---|---|---|---|---|---|---|---|---|---|---|---|---|---|---|---|---|---|
| 0 | 0 | 0 | 0 | 0 | 0 | 0 | 0 | 0 | 0 | 0 | 0 | 0 | 0 | 0 | 0 | 0 | 0 | 0 | 0 |

==== Results by round ====
| Round | 1 | 2 | 3 | 4 | 5 | 6 | 7 | 8 | 9 | 10 | 11 | 12 | 13 | 14 | 15 | 16 | 17 | 18 | 19 | 20 | 21 | 22 | 23 | 24 | 25 | 26 | 27 | 28 | 29 | 30 | 31 | 32 | 33 | 34 | 35 | 36 | 37 | 38 |
|---|---|---|---|---|---|---|---|---|---|---|---|---|---|---|---|---|---|---|---|---|---|---|---|---|---|---|---|---|---|---|---|---|---|---|---|---|---|---|
| Ground | A | H | A | H | A | H | A | H | A | H | A | A | H | H | A | H | A | H | A | H | A | H | A | H | A | H | A | H | A | H | H | A | A | H | A | H | A | H |
| Result | L | D | D | D | L | D | W | D | D | D | W | L | W | D | L | L | W | D | L | D | W | L | D | D | D | W | W | L | D | W | W | L | L | L | W | L | D | W |
| Position | 19 | 19 | 16 | 17 | 18 | 17 | 14 | 14 | 13 | 14 | 13 | 14 | 13 | 13 | 13 | 14 | 13 | 13 | 13 | 12 | 12 | 13 | 14 | 14 | 15 | 13 | 11 | 14 | 13 | 12 | 10 | 11 | 12 | 14 | 11 | 14 | 13 | 12 |

A = Away; H = Home; W = Win; D = Draw; L = Loss

==== Matches ====
| 26 September 2020 1 | Venezia | 1–0 | Vicenza | Venice |
| | | | | Stadium: Stadio Pier Luigi Penzo |

| 3 October 2020 2 | Vicenza | 1–1 | Pordenone | Vicenza |
| | | | | Stadium: Stadio Romeo Menti |

| 20 October 2020 4 | Vicenza | 1–1 | Salernitana | Vicenza |
| | | | | Stadium: Stadio Romeo Menti |

| 24 October 2020 5 | SPAL | 3–2 | Vicenza | Ferrara |
| | | | | Stadium: Stadio Paolo Mazza |

| 31 October 2020 6 | Vicenza | 4–4 | Pisa | Vicenza |
| | | | | Stadium: Stadio Romeo Menti |

| 7 November 2020 7 | Cremonese | 0–1 | Vicenza | Cremona |
| | | | | Stadium: Stadio Giovanni Zini |

| 28 November 2020 9 | Empoli | 2–2 | Vicenza | Empoli |
| | | | | Stadium: Stadio Carlo Castellani |

| 2 December 2020 3 | Monza | 1–1 | Vicenza | Monza |
| | | | | Stadium: Stadio Brianteo |

| 6 December 2020 10 | Vicenza | 1–1 | Cosenza | Vicenza |
| | | | | Stadium: Stadio Romeo Menti |

| 12 December 2020 11 | Pescara | 2–3 | Vicenza | Pescara |
| | | | | Stadium: Stadio Adriatico |

| 15 December 2020 12 | Cittadella | 3–0 | Vicenza | Cittadella |
| | | | | Stadium: Stadio Pier Cesare Tombolato |

| 19 December 2020 13 | Vicenza | 2–1 | Ascoli | Vicenza |
| | | | | Stadium: Stadio Romeo Menti |

| 22 December 2020 14 | Vicenza | 1–1 | Reggina | Vicenza |
| | | | | Stadium: Stadio Romeo Menti |

| 27 December 2020 15 | Lecce | 2–1 | Vicenza | Lecce |
| | | | | Stadium: Stadio Via del mare |

| 30 December 2020 16 | Vicenza | 0–1 | Virtus Entella | Vicenza |
| | | | | Stadium: Stadio Romeo Menti |

| 4 January 2021 18 | Brescia | 0–3 | Vicenza | Brescia |
| | | | | Stadium: Stadio Mario Rigamonti |

| 15 January 2021 18 | Vicenza | 0–0 | Frosinone | Vicenza |
| | | | | Stadium: Stadio Romeo Menti |

| 19 January 2021 8 | Vicenza | 1–1 | Chievo | Vicenza |
| | | | | Stadium: Stadio Romeo Menti |

| 23 January 2021 19 | Reggiana | 2–1 | Vicenza | Reggio Emilia |
| 14:00 | | | | Stadium: Mapei Stadium – Città del Tricolore; Referee: Alessandro Prontera |

| 29 January 2021 20 | Vicenza | 0–0 | Venezia | Vicenza |
| | | | | Stadium: Stadio Romeo Menti |

| 6 February 2021 21 | Pordenone | 1–2 | Vicenza | Pordenone |

| 9 February 2021 22 | Vicenza | 1–2 | Monza | Vicenza |
| | | | | Stadium: Stadio Romeo Menti |

| 13 February 2021 23 | Salernitana | 1–1 | Vicenza | Salerno |

| 20 February 2021 24 | Vicenza | 2–2 | SPAL | Vicenza |
| | | | | Stadium: Stadio Romeo Menti |

| 27 February 2021 25 | Pisa | 2–2 | Vicenza | Pisa |

| 2 March 2021 26 | Vicenza | 3–1 | Cremonese | Vicenza |
| | | | | Stadium: Stadio Romeo Menti |

| 8 March 2021 27 | Chievo | 1–2 | Vicenza | Verona |

| 13 March 2021 28 | Vicenza | 0–2 | Empoli | Vicenza |
| | | | | Stadium: Stadio Romeo Menti |

| 16 March 2021 29 | Cosenza | 1–1 | Vicenza | Cosenza |

| 20 March 2021 30 | Vicenza | 1–0 | Pescara | Vicenza |
| | | | | Stadium: Stadio Romeo Menti |

| 2 April 2021 31 | Vicenza | 1–0 | Cittadella | Vicenza |
| | | | | Stadium: Stadio Romeo Menti |

| 5 April 2021 32 | Ascoli | 2–1 | Vicenza | Ascoli Piceno |
| | | | | Stadium: Stadio Cino e Lillo Del Duca |

| 11 April 2021 33 | Reggina | 3–0 | Vicenza | Reggio Calabria |
| | | | | Stadium: Stadio Oreste Granillo |

| 17 April 2021 34 | Vicenza | 1–2 | Lecce | Vicenza |
| | | | | Stadium: Stadio Romeo Menti |

| 1 May 2021 35 | Virtus Entella | 1–2 | Vicenza | Chiavari |
| 14:00 | Rodríguez 75' | | Valentini 16'; Cappelletti 79' | Stadium: Stadio Comunale; Referee: Lorenzo Illuzzi |

| 4 May 2021 34 | Vicenza | 0–3 | Brescia | Vicenza |
| 14:00 | | | Bjarnason 38'; Donnarumma 41' (pen.), 50' | Stadium: Stadio Romeo Menti; Referee: Daniele Paterna |

| 7 May 2021 37 | Frosinone | 1–1 | Vicenza | Frosinone |
| 14:00 | Brignola 76' | | Vandeputte 74' | Stadium: Stadio Benito Stirpe; Referee: Lorenzo Maggioni |

| 10 May 2021 38 | Vicenza | 2–1 | Reggiana | Vicenza |
| 14:00 | Giacomelli 13'; Jallow 90+1' | | Yao 37' | Stadium: Stadio Romeo Menti; Referee: Luca Zufferli |

=== Coppa Italia ===
| 30 September 2020 Second round | Vicenza | 3–2 (a.e.t.) | Pro Patria | Vicenza |
| 17:00 | Giacomelli 45+1' (pen.); Ierardi (yellow card) 69'; Bertoni (yellow card) 84'; Marotta 93' (pen.); Scoppa (yellow card) 97'; Vandeputte 110' | Report | Kolaj (yellow card) 14'; Parker 32'; Boffelli (yellow card) 39' (yellow-red card); Latte Lath 118' | Stadium: Stadio Romeo Menti; Referee: Giovanni Ayroldi |

| 28 October 2020 Third round | Udinese | 3–1 | Vicenza | Udine |
| 18:00 | Forestieri 21', (yellow card) 90+4'; Deulofeu 61'; Pussetto 64' | Report | Barlocco (yellow card) 20'; Da Riva (yellow card) 73'; Fantoni (yellow card) 76'; Gori 88'; Bizzotto (yellow card) 90+3' | Stadium: Stadio Friuli; Referee: Andrea Rapuano |
