= 2012–13 US Grosseto FC season =

U.S. Grosseto F.C.
2012–13 season
- President: Piero Camilli
- Head coach: Francesco Moriero; Lamberto Magrini; Luigi Consonni; Leonardo Menichini
- Stadium: Stadio Olimpico Carlo Zecchini
- Serie B: 22nd (relegated)
- Coppa Italia: Second round
Home colours	Away colours	Third colours

The 2012–13 season was the 86th season in the history of U.S. Grosseto F.C. and the club's sixth consecutive season in the second division. The club participated in Serie B and the Coppa Italia.

== Players ==
Note: Flags indicate national team as defined under FIFA eligibility rules; some limited exceptions apply. Players may hold more than one non-FIFA nationality.

No.	Pos.	Nation	Player
2	DF	ITA	Giovanni Formiconi
3	DF	ITA	Samuele Olivi (captain)
4	DF	VEN	Rolf Feltscher (on loan from Parma)
5	MF	GHA	Yaw Asante
6	MF	ITA	Marco Crimi
7	MF	ITA	Nicola Mancino
8	DF	CMR	Thomas Som
9	FW	ITA	Arturo Lupoli
10	MF	MAR	Abderrazzak Jadid
11	FW	ITA	Federico Piovaccari (on loan from Sampdoria)
12	GK	ITA	Ivan Lanni
13	MF	NGA	Kenneth Obodo
14	DF	ITA	Angelo Iorio
15	DF	ITA	Davide Biraschi
16	MF	ITA	Simone Esposito
17	FW	ITA	Henry Damián Giménez (on loan from Bologna)
18	FW	ITA	Marco Giovio

No.	Pos.	Nation	Player
19	DF	ITA	Federico Barba (on loan from Roma)
20	MF	ITA	Matteo Mandorlini (on loan from Brescia)
21	MF	ITA	Daniele Quadrini
22	GK	ITA	Nunzio Franza
23	DF	CRO	Vedran Celjak (on loan from Sampdoria)
24	MF	ITA	Danilo Soddimo (on loan from Pescara)
27	DF	ITA	Marco Calderoni
28	MF	URU	Gastón Brugman (on loan from Pescara)
29	DF	ITA	Emanuele Padella
30	DF	ITA	Giulio Donati (on loan from Inter)
31	MF	ITA	Marcello Falzerano
32	DF	ITA	Francesco Cosenza (on loan from Pro Vercelli)
33	DF	ITA	Michele Rigione
34	MF	ITA	Valerio Foglio
35	MF	ITA	Gennaro Delvecchio
36	FW	CIV	Souleymane Coulibaly (on loan from (England) Tottenham Hotspur)

=== Out on loan ===
Note: Flags indicate national team as defined under FIFA eligibility rules; some limited exceptions apply. Players may hold more than one non-FIFA nationality.

No.	Pos.	Nation	Player
1	GK	URU	Nicolás Bremec (at Vicenza)
17	MF	ITA	Marco Guidone (at Fondi)

No.	Pos.	Nation	Player
24	MF	ITA	Filippo Tajani (at Fondi)
—	DF	ITA	Simone Barigelli (at Borgo a Buggiano)

== Competitions ==
=== Overall record ===
Competition	First match	Last match	Starting round	Final position	Record							
Competition	First match	Last match	Starting round	Final position	Pld	W	D	L	GF	GA	GD	Win %
Serie B	25 August 2012	18 May 2013	Matchday 1	22nd	42	7	13	22	44	72	−28	16.67
Coppa Italia	12 August 2022		Second round	Second round	1	0	0	1	1	3	−2	0.00
Total					43	7	13	23	45	75	−30	16.28

Source: Competitions

=== Serie B ===
==== League table ====
Pos	Team	Pld	W	D	L	GF	GA	GD	Pts	Promotion or relegation
18	Virtus Lanciano (Note: No relegation playoffs will be held as Virtus Lanciano is more than 4 points clear of 4th-last place.)	42	9	21	12	50	60	−10	48	
19	Vicenza (R)	42	10	12	20	41	58	−17	42	Relegation to Lega Pro Prima Divisione
20	Ascoli (Note: Ascoli and Varese were docked 1 point due to the 2011 Italian football scandal.) (R)	42	11	9	22	48	67	−19	41	Relegation to Lega Pro Prima Divisione
21	Pro Vercelli (R)	42	8	9	25	37	67	−30	33	Relegation to Lega Pro Prima Divisione
22	Grosseto (R)	42	7	13	22	44	72	−28	28 (Note: Grosseto was docked 6 points due to the 2011 Italian football scandal.)	Relegation to Lega Pro Prima Divisione

Source: Serie B
Rules for classification: 1) points; 2) head-to-head points; 3) head-to-head goal difference; 4) head-to-head goals scored; 5) goal difference; 6) number of goals scored.
(R) Relegated

==== Results summary ====
Overall								Home						Away					
Pld	W	D	L	GF	GA	GD	Pts	W	D	L	GF	GA	GD	W	D	L	GF	GA	GD
0	0	0	0	0	0	0	0	0	0	0	0	0	0	0	0	0	0	0	0

Source: Serie B

==== Results by round ====
Round	1	2	3	4	5	6	7	8	9	10	11	12	13	14	15	16	17	18	19	20	21	22	23	24	25	26	27	28	29	30	31	32	33	34	35	36	37	38	39	40	41	42
Ground	H	A	A	H	A	H	A	H	A	A	H	A	H	H	A	H	A	H	A	H	A	A	H	H	A	H	A	H	A	H	H	A	H	A	A	H	A	H	A	H	A	H
Result	D	L	D	W	D	D	L	L	L	D	D	L	W	D	L	D	L	W	L	L	L	L	W	D	L	D	L	L	W	L	W	D	L	L	L	L	L	L	D	D	L	W
Position	22	22	22	22	22	22	22	22	22	22	22	22	22	22	22	22	22	22	22	22	22	22	22	22	22	22	22	22	22	22	22	22	22	22	22	22	22	22	22	22	22	22

Source: Serie B
A = Away; H = Home; W = Win; D = Draw; L = Loss

==== Matches ====
25 August 2012 1	Grosseto	1–1	Novara	Grosseto
19:45 CEST (UTC+2)				Stadium: Stadio Olimpico Carlo Zecchini

1 September 2012 2	Cittadella	2–1	Grosseto	Cittadella
19:45 CEST (UTC+2)				Stadium: Stadio Pier Cesare Tombolato

15 September 2012 4	Grosseto	1–0	Crotone	Grosseto
14:00 CEST (UTC+2)				Stadium: Stadio Olimpico Carlo Zecchini

25 September 2012 6	Grosseto	2–2	Juve Stabia	Grosseto
19:45 CEST (UTC+2)				Stadium: Stadio Olimpico Carlo Zecchini

6 October 2012 8	Grosseto	1–2	Sassuolo	Grosseto
14:00 CEST (UTC+2)				Stadium: Stadio Olimpico Carlo Zecchini

20 October 2012 10	Modena	0–0	Grosseto	Modena
14:00 CEST (UTC+2)				Stadium: Stadio Alberto Braglia

27 October 2012 11	Grosseto	1–1	Ternana	Grosseto
14:00 CEST (UTC+2)				Stadium: Stadio Olimpico Carlo Zecchini

30 October 2012 12	Cesena	3–2	Grosseto	Cesena
19:45 CET (UTC+1)				Stadium: Stadio Dino Manuzzi

3 November 2012 13	Grosseto	3–2	Ascoli	Grosseto
14:00 CET (UTC+1)				Stadium: Stadio Olimpico Carlo Zecchini

9 November 2012 14	Grosseto	1–1	Spezia	Grosseto
19:45 CET (UTC+1)				Stadium: Stadio Olimpico Carlo Zecchini

24 November 2012 16	Grosseto	2–2	Brescia	Grosseto
14:00 CET (UTC+1)				Stadium: Stadio Olimpico Carlo Zecchini

8 December 2012 18	Grosseto	3–0	Pro Vercelli	Grosseto
14:00 CET (UTC+1)				Stadium: Stadio Olimpico Carlo Zecchini

23 December 2012 20	Grosseto	0–1	Reggina	Grosseto
14:00 CET (UTC+1)				Stadium: Stadio Olimpico Carlo Zecchini

26 January 2013 23	Grosseto	3–1	Cittadella	Grosseto
14:00 CET (UTC+1)				Stadium: Stadio Olimpico Carlo Zecchini

2 February 2013 24	Grosseto	1–1	Padova	Grosseto
14:00 CET (UTC+1)				Stadium: Stadio Olimpico Carlo Zecchini

16 February 2013 26	Grosseto	2–2	Virtus Lanciano	Grosseto
14:00 CET (UTC+1)				Stadium: Stadio Olimpico Carlo Zecchini

26 February 2013 28	Grosseto	1–2	Vicenza	Grosseto
19:45 CET (UTC+1)				Stadium: Stadio Olimpico Carlo Zecchini

9 March 2013 30	Grosseto	0–2	Hellas Verona	Grosseto
14:00 CET (UTC+1)				Stadium: Stadio Olimpico Carlo Zecchini

16 March 2013 31	Grosseto	2–0	Modena	Grosseto
14:00 CET (UTC+1)				Stadium: Stadio Olimpico Carlo Zecchini

23 March 2013 33	Grosseto	1–2	Cesena	Grosseto
17:00 CET (UTC+1)				Stadium: Stadio Olimpico Carlo Zecchini

12 April 2013 36	Grosseto	0–1	Empoli	Grosseto
18:00 CEST (UTC+2)				Stadium: Stadio Olimpico Carlo Zecchini

16 April 2013 37	Brescia	3–1	Grosseto	Brescia
19:45 CEST (UTC+2)				Stadium: Stadio Mario Rigamonti

20 April 2013 38	Grosseto	0–3	Livorno	Grosseto
14:00 CEST (UTC+2)				Stadium: Stadio Olimpico Carlo Zecchini

27 April 2013 39	Pro Vercelli	0–0	Grosseto	Vercelli
14:00 CEST (UTC+2)				Stadium: Stadio Silvio Piola

4 May 2013 40	Grosseto	2–2	Varese	Grosseto
14:00 CEST (UTC+2)				Stadium: Stadio Olimpico Carlo Zecchini

11 May 2013 41	Reggina	1–0	Grosseto	Reggio Calabria
14:00 CEST (UTC+2)				Stadium: Stadio Oreste Granillo

18 May 2013 42	Grosseto	4–3	Bari	Grosseto
13:30 CEST (UTC+2)				Stadium: Stadio Olimpico Carlo Zecchini

=== Coppa Italia ===
12 August 2012 Second round	Grosseto	1–3	Carpi	Grosseto
20:45 CEST (UTC+2)	Sforzini 1'		Kabine 52'; De Bode 65'; Di Gaudio 90'	Stadium: Stadio Olimpico Carlo Zecchini; Attendance: 632; Referee: Claudio Gavillucci
