= Joel Obi =

Nigerian footballer (born 1991)

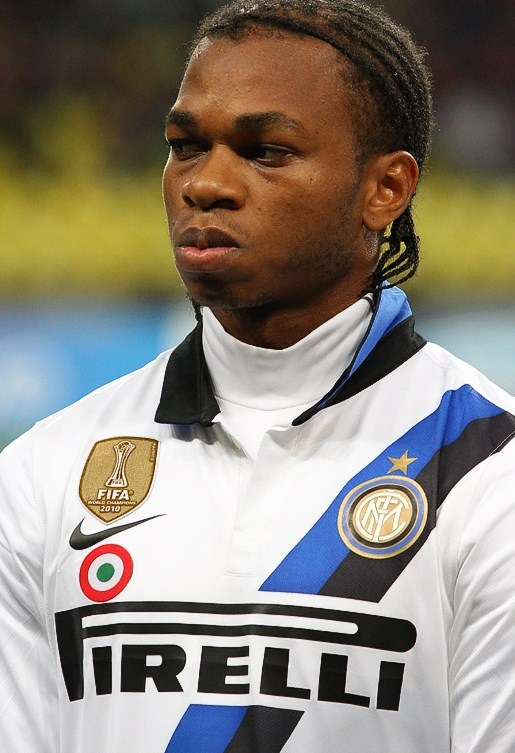
- Obi with Inter in 2011

Personal information
- Full name: Joel Chukwuma Obi
- Date of birth: 22 May 1991 (age 35)
- Place of birth: Lagos, Nigeria
- Height: 1.77 m (5 ft 10 in)
- Position: Midfielder

Youth career
- 2005–2010: Inter Milan

Senior career*
Years	Team	Apps	(Gls)
2010–2015	Inter Milan	50	(1)
2013–2014	→ Parma (loan)	8	(0)
2015–2018	Torino	52	(6)
2018–2021	Chievo	71	(6)
2019	→ Alanyaspor (loan)	2	(0)
2021–2022	Salernitana	21	(0)
2022–2023	Reggina	1	(0)
2024–2025	Vis Pesaro	17	(0)

International career^{‡}
2011–2018	Nigeria	17	(0)
- * Club domestic league appearances and goals as of 27 April 2025 ‡ National team caps and goals as of 14 September 2019

Joel Chukwuma Obi (born 22 May 1991) is a Nigerian former professional footballer who played as a midfielder.

== Club career ==
=== Inter ===
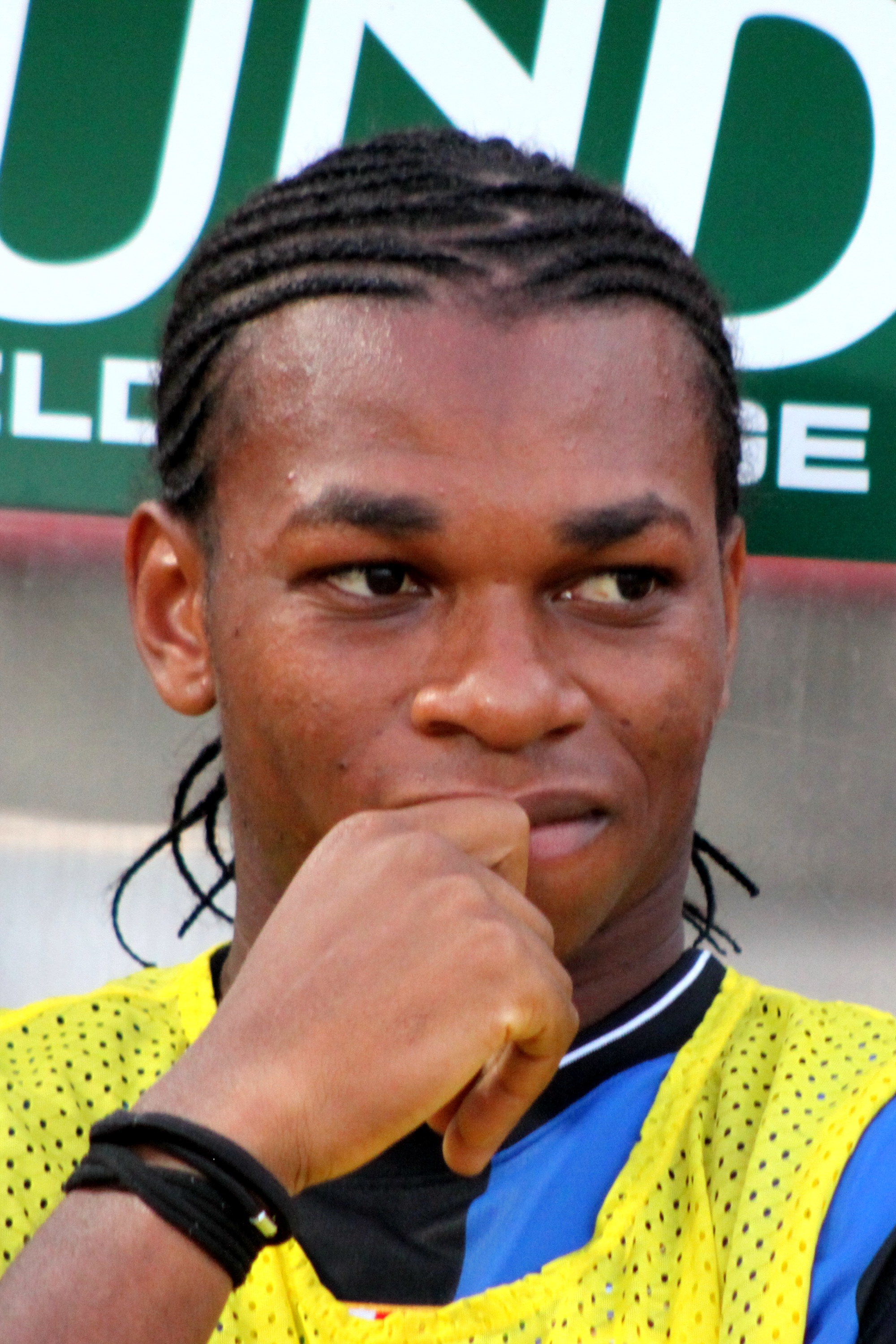
Joel Obi with Inter

After winning the "Allievi Nazionali" Under-17 championship in 2008 under the guidance of Daniele Bernazzani, Obi moved to the Primavera formation, where he collected over 40 appearances and six goals in just under three years.

In 2009, he was noticed by José Mourinho and led occasionally to the first-team of Inter. In 2010, even if without playing, he was registered to the club's 'A' list of players, who won the Champions League in the final against Bayern Munich.

In the summer 2010, Rafael Benítez definitively moved him with the first-team. Obi made his debut for Inter on 29 September 2010 in a UEFA Champions League group stage game against Werder Bremen. He played the final ten minutes of the match after coming on as a substitute in the 80th minute for fellow midfielder Dejan Stanković. Inter went on to defeat Werder Bremen in a 4–0 shutout.

Obi made his Serie A debut on 17 October 2010 against Cagliari when he replaced Philippe Coutinho in the 66th minute. The game ended 1–0 with a goal from Samuel Eto'o.

Obi started the "Milan Derby" at Beijing for the Supercoppa Italiana on 14 November but had to be substituted after only 35 minutes because of injury, he was replaced by Coutinho. In January 2011, Obi and Nwankwo Obiora were sold in co-ownership to Parma for just €750 and €300,000 respectively . However, Obi remained at Inter for the rest of the season, collecting 10 appearances in the league, two in Coppa Italia and one in the Champions League. In the league he was a starter under both Gian Piero Gasperini and the new coach, Claudio Ranieri. On 27 September he got his first start in the Champions League, and on 1 October, was sent for the first time in his career after a second yellow card at home to Napoli. On 17 January 2012 Parma sold their 50% share of Obi back to Inter for €3.2 million (€1.7 million plus Crisetig) and his salary was raised to a reported €600,000 per year. On 29 April, Obi scored his first goal in Serie A against Cesena, the momentary equaliser 1–1, in an eventual 2–1 victory. He concluded the 2011–12 season with 27 appearances in Serie A, two in Coppa Italia and seven in the Champions League, plus one in the final of Supercoppa Italiana. However, his season was cut short by a bad injury that restricted him to a long period of rest.

Remaining at a standstill due to injury, he returned to the field in 2012–13 season, exactly on 4 October, in the victory away from home 1–3 against Neftchi Baku in the Europa League scoring the goal of 0–2, which was the 500th goal in UEFA competition for Inter. He concluded the season with two appearances in the league, one in the Coppa Italia and one in the Europa League.

==== Parma (loan) ====
On 2 September 2013, he was loaned to Parma, in an away match against Catania, substituting Marco Parolo. After only eight appearances he returned to Inter.

=== Return to Inter ===
On 28 August 2014, he returned to play for Inter in a home match won 6–0 in the Europa League against Stjarnan. Obi continuously played as a winger in Walter Mazzarri's 3-5-2 formation due to the numerous injuries of his teammates. On 23 November, he played as the starter in the Milan derby, scoring the equaliser (1–1), in his first goal of the season, celebrating with somersaults. He returned to the field as a starter in the home match lost 0–1 against Torino on 25 January 2015, playing as a fullback. He concluded the season with 17 appearances and one goal. Overall for Inter he made 71 appearances and scored three goals.

=== Torino ===
On 2 July 2015, Obi transferred to Torino for a €2.2 million fee and signed a 4-year contract. At the beginning of the season he quickly suffered two injuries, the last of which, constraint him to missing the first half of the 2015–16 season. He returned to the field, playing as a starter in the match against Chievo Verona on 7 February 2016, replaced by Alexander Farnerud in the second half. On 26 August 2017, he made his 24th appearance for Torino against Sassuolo and scored his second goal and first of the season in the 88th minute. The match ended 3–0 in favour of Torino at home.

=== Chievo Verona ===
On 11 August 2018, Obi signed with Serie A club Chievo Verona on a three-year contract with an option for another season. Obi was loaned to Turkish club Alanyaspor in January 2019 for the second half of the 2018–19 campaign.

During the 2020–21 season, the midfielder scored four goals in 31 Serie B games for Chievo.

=== Salernitana ===
On 21 July 2021, Obi signed with newly promoted Serie A club U.S. Salernitana 1919 on a free transfer. Obi agreed to a one-year contract with the option of an extension.

=== Reggina ===
On 20 July 2022, Obi joined Reggina on a two-year contract.

=== Vis Pesaro ===
In January 2024, Obi joined Serie C Group B club Vis Pesaro on a two-year contract.

== International career ==
Obi made his international debut for the Nigeria national team on 9 February 2011 in a friendly game with Sierra Leone in Lagos. He started the next 11 games in a row for the Eagles before getting injured near the end of 2012. He was named in the preliminary squad for the 2014 World Cup.

In June 2018 he was named in Nigeria's 23-man squad for the 2018 FIFA World Cup in Russia.

== Career statistics ==
=== Club ===
As of 22 May 2022

Appearances and goals by club, season and competition
Club	Season	League			National Cup		Continental		Other		Total	
Club	Season	Division	Apps	Goals	Apps	Goals	Apps	Goals	Apps	Goals	Apps	Goals
Internazionale	2010–11	Serie A	10	0	2	0	1 (Note: Appearances in UEFA Champions League)	0	0	0	13	0
Internazionale	2011–12	Serie A	27	0	2	0	7	0	1 (Note: Appearance in Supercoppa Italiana)	0	37	0
Internazionale	2012–13	Serie A	2	0	1	0	1 (Note: Appearances in UEFA Europa League)	1	—		4	1
Internazionale	2014–15	Serie A	11	1	1	0	3	0	—		15	1
Internazionale	Total		50	1	6	0	12	1	1	0	69	2
Parma (loan)	2013–14	Serie A	8	0	0	0	—		—		8	0
Torino	2015–16	Serie A	10	1	1	0	—		—		11	1
Torino	2016–17	Serie A	20	0	3	0	—		—		23	0
Torino	2017–18	Serie A	22	5	3	1	—		—		25	6
Torino	Total		52	6	7	1	—		—		59	7
Chievo	2018–19	Serie A	11	1	0	0	—		—		11	1
Chievo	2019–20	Serie A	29	1	0	0	—		—		29	1
Chievo	2020–21	Serie B	31	4	1	0	—		—		32	4
Chievo	Total		71	6	1	0	—		—		72	6
Alanyaspor (loan)	2018–19	Süper Lig	2	0	0	0	—		—		2	0
Salernitana	2021–22	Serie A	21	0	2	0	—		—		23	0
Career total			204	13	16	1	12	1	1	0	233	15

=== International ===
As of 22 June 2018

Appearances and goals by national team and year
National team	Year	Apps	Goals
Nigeria	2011	11	0
Nigeria	2012	0	0
Nigeria	2013	0	0
Nigeria	2014	1	0
Nigeria	2015	0	0
Nigeria	2016	0	0
Nigeria	2017	0	0
Nigeria	2018	4	0
Total		16	0

== Honours ==
Internazionale

- Coppa Italia: 2010–11
- Supercoppa Italiana: 2010
- FIFA Club World Cup: 2010
