= Manuel De Luca =

Italian footballer (born 1998)

Personal information
- Date of birth: 17 July 1998 (age 28)
- Place of birth: Bolzano, Italy
- Height: 1.92 m (6 ft 4 in)
- Position: Forward

Team information
- Current team: Cremonese

Youth career
- –2015: Südtirol
- 2013–2014: → Inter Milan (loan)
- 2014–2015: → Torino (loan)
- 2015–2017: Torino

Senior career*
Years	Team	Apps	(Gls)
2017–2020	Torino	0	(0)
2018	→ Renate (loan)	13	(3)
2018–2019	→ Alessandria (loan)	35	(10)
2019–2020	→ Virtus Entella (loan)	19	(3)
2020–2021	Chievo	32	(6)
2021–2024	Sampdoria	34	(10)
2021–2022	→ Perugia (loan)	34	(10)
2024–	Cremonese	36	(9)
2026	→ Modena (loan)	20	(3)

International career
2013	Italy U16	4	(0)
- * Club domestic league appearances and goals as of 10 May 2026

Manuel De Luca (born 17 July 1998) is an Italian professional footballer who plays as a forward for Serie B club Cremonese.

== Club career ==
=== Torino ===
De Luca made his first-team debut for Torino on 3 January 2018 in a 2017–18 Coppa Italia quarterfinal against Juventus, coming on as a late substitute as Torino lost 0–2.

==== Loan to Renate ====
On 16 January 2018, De Luca was loaned to Serie C side Renate on a 6-month loan deal. On 22 January he made his Serie C debut for Renate as a substitute replacing Antonio Palma in the 58th minute of a 2–0 away defeat against AlbinoLeffe. On 3 February, De Luca played his first entire match for Renate and he scored his first professional goal in the 71st minute of a 2–1 away defeat against Reggiana. On 31 March he received his first red card, as a substitute, in the 79th minute of a 1–1 home draw against Mestre. On 22 April he scored his second goal in the 55th minute of a 1–0 away win over Santarcangelo. On 6 May he scored his third goal, as a substitute, in the 82nd minute of a 1–1 away draw against Pordenone. De Luca ended his loan to Renate with 14 appearances, 3 goals and 1 assist.

==== Loan to Alessandria ====
On 28 July 2018, De Luca was signed by Serie C side Alessandria on a season-long loan deal. On 29 July he made his debut for Alessandria in a 1–0 home defeat against Giana Erminio in the first round of Coppa Italia, he was replaced by Michele Marconi in the 56th minute. On 16 September he made his Serie C debut for Alessandria and he scored his first goal for the team in the 60th minute of a 2–1 away win over Juventus U23, he was replaced by Erik Panizzi after 82 minutes. One week later, on 23 September, he played his first entire match for Alessandria, a 3–1 home defeat against Pro Piacenza. On 14 October he scored his second goal in the 39th minute of a 1–1 home draw against Robur Siena. One week later he scored his third goal in the 79th minute of a 1–0 away win over Arzachena. On 28 October he was sent off with a red card in the 80th minute of a 1–1 home draw against Gozzano. De Luca ended his loan to Alessandria with 37 appearances, 11 goals and 1 assist.

==== Loan to Virtus Entella ====
On 17 July 2019, De Luca was loaned to newly Serie B promoted club Virtus Entella on a season-long loan deal. On 14 September he made his Serie B debut for the club as a substitute replacing Claudio Morra in the 62nd minute of a 1–0 home win over Frosinone. Ten days later, on 24 September, De Luca he played his first match as a starter for Virtus Entella, a 2–0 home defeat against Venezia, he was replaced after 62 minutes by Matteo Mancosu. On 14 December he played his first entire match and he also scored his first goal in Serie B for the club in the 40th minute of a 2–0 home win over Empoli. Two weeks later he scored his second goal, as a substitute, in the 90th minute of a 3–1 away win over Cittadella. On 31 July 2020 he scored his third goal for the club in the 49th minute of a 3–2 home defeat against Cittadella. De Luca ended his loan to Virtus Entella with 19 appearances, including 11 of them as a starter, 3 goals and 1 assist.

=== ChievoVerona ===
On 22 September 2020, De Luca moved to ChievoVerona. Four days later, on 26 September, he made his debut for the club as a substitute replacing Michael Fabbro for the last 17 minutes of a 0–0 away draw against Pescara. Four more days later, on 30 September, De Luca scored his first goal for Chievo in the 43rd minute of a 1–1 draw against Catanzaro in the second round of Coppa Italia, however Chievo lost 7–6 at penalties, he played the entire match. On 11 December he played his first match as a starter in the league for Chievo, a 3–0 home win over Reggina, he was replaced by Filip Đorđević in the 67th minute.

=== Sampdoria ===
On 12 August 2021, De Luca signed a four-year contract with Sampdoria.

==== Loan to Perugia ====
On 26 August 2021, De Luca joined Perugia on a season-long loan.

=== Modena ===
On 6 January 2026, De Luca was loaned by Modena, with an option to buy and a conditional obligation to buy.

== Career statistics ==
=== Club ===
As of match played 29 August 2025

Appearances and goals by club, season and competition
Club	Season	League			Cup		Europe		Other		Total	
Club	Season	League	Apps	Goals	Apps	Goals	Apps	Goals	Apps	Goals	Apps	Goals
Torino	2017–18	Serie A	0	0	1	0	—		—		1	0
Renate (loan)	2017–18	Serie C	13	3	1 (Note: Appearance(s) in Coppa Italia Serie C)	0	—		1 (Note: Appearance(s) in Serie C play-off)	0	15	3
Alessandria (loan)	2018–19	Serie C	35	10	3 (Note: Two appearances and one goal in Coppa Italia Serie C, one appearance in Coppa Italia)	1	—		1	1	39	12
Virtus Entella (loan)	2019–20	Serie B	19	3	0	0	—		—		19	3
Chievo	2020–21	Serie B	32	6	1	1	—		—		33	7
Perugia (loan)	2020–21	Serie B	33	10	0	0	—		1 (Note: Appearance(s) in Serie B promotion play-off)	0	34	10
Sampdoria	2022–23	Serie A	2	0	1	0	—		—		3	0
Sampdoria	2023–24	Serie B	32	10	2	0	—		1	0	35	10
Sampdoria	Total		34	10	3	0	—		1	0	38	10
Cremonese	2024–25	Serie B	34	8	2	1	—		3	2	39	11
Cremonese	2025–26	Serie A	2	1	1	0	—		—		3	1
Cremonese	Total		36	9	3	1	—		3	2	42	12
Career total			202	51	12	3	—		7	3	221	57
