= Daniel Pavlev =

Slovenian footballer

Personal information
- Date of birth: 11 October 2000 (age 26)
- Place of birth: Šempeter pri Gorici, Slovenia
- Height: 1.79 m (5 ft 10 in)
- Position: Defender

Team information
- Current team: Primorje
- Number: 72

Youth career
- 2014–2015: Gorica
- –2020: Chievo

Senior career*
Years	Team	Apps	(Gls)
2019–2021	Chievo	1	(0)
2021–2023	Viterbese	47	(1)
2023–2025	Triestina	33	(2)
2025–	Primorje	0	(0)

International career^{‡}
2016	Slovenia U16	7	(0)
2016	Slovenia U17	2	(0)
2017	Slovenia U18	1	(0)
2018	Slovenia U19	1	(0)
- * Club domestic league appearances and goals as of 25 April 2025 ‡ National team caps and goals as of 17 November 2018

Daniel Pavlev (born 11 October 2000) is a Slovenian footballer who plays as a defender for Primorje.

== Club career ==
Pavlev was raised in the youth teams of Chievo and started playing for their Under-19 squad in the 2016–17 season. He began receiving call-ups to the senior squad in the summer of 2019.

He made his Serie B debut for Chievo on 26 September 2020 in a game against Pescara. He substituted Luca Palmiero in the 89th minute.

On 10 August 2021, he signed a two-year contract with Viterbese.
