= Vasile Mogoș =

Romanian footballer

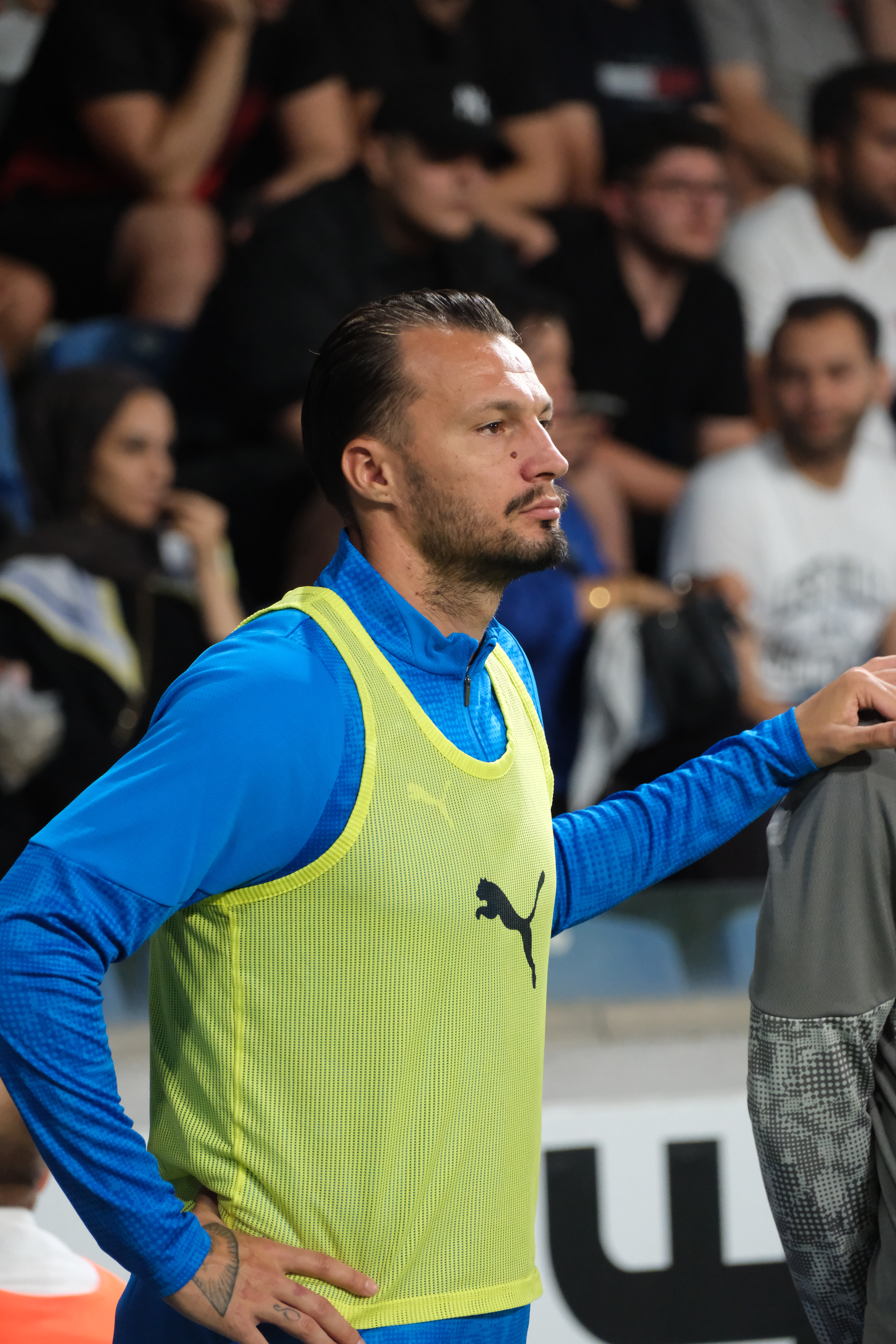
- Mogoș with Universitatea Craiova in 2025

Personal information
- Date of birth: 31 October 1992 (age 34)
- Place of birth: Vaslui, Romania
- Height: 1.86 m (6 ft 1 in)
- Positions: Defender; wing-back

Team information
- Current team: Bari
- Number: 6

Youth career
- 2003–2010: Asti

Senior career*
Years	Team	Apps	(Gls)
2010–2012	Asti	65	(5)
2012–2013	Real Vicenza	36	(4)
2013–2014	Delta Porto Tolle	13	(2)
2014–2015	Lumezzane	29	(4)
2015	Teramo	0	(0)
2015–2017	Reggiana	49	(7)
2017–2018	Ascoli	46	(1)
2018–2020	Cremonese	62	(7)
2020–2021	Chievo	35	(3)
2021–2023	Crotone	41	(4)
2023–2025	CFR Cluj	49	(0)
2025–2026	Universitatea Craiova	25	(1)
2026–	Bari	4	(0)

International career^{‡}
2019–	Romania	8	(0)
- * Club domestic league appearances and goals as of 26 September 2026 ‡ National team caps and goals as of 2 July 2024

Vasile Mogoș (born 31 October 1992) is a Romanian professional footballer who plays as a defender or a wing-back for Serie C Group C club Bari.

== Club career ==
=== Early years ===
Born in Vaslui, Mogoș started his career at Italian Serie D club Asti. Mogoș finished fifth in 2012–13 Serie D Group C with Real Vicenza. The club was invited to play in 2013–14 Lega Pro Seconda Divisione. However, Mogoș was signed by another L.P. 2nd Division club Delta Porto Tolle.

On 26 September 2014 Mogoș was signed by Lega Pro club Lumezzane.

=== Teramo ===
On 2 July 2015 Mogoș was signed by Serie B newcomer Teramo in a two-year deal. However, after the club was compelled to relegate to 2015–16 Lega Pro following a match-fixing scandal, Mogoș left the club. Mogoș appeared once for Teramo in 2015–16 Coppa Italia.

Mogoș was signed by Lega Pro team Reggiana in a two-year deal on 2 September.

=== Chievo ===
On 24 September 2020, he signed with Serie B club Chievo.

=== CFR Cluj ===
On 4 July 2023, Mogoș moved to his native Romania to sign for Liga I club CFR Cluj.

== International career ==
He made his debut for Romania national team on 15 November 2019 in a Euro 2020 qualifier against Sweden. He started the game and played the whole match in a 2–0 loss.

== Career statistics ==
=== Club ===
As of 26 September 2026.

Appearances and goals by club, season and competition
Club	Season	League			National cup (Note: Includes Coppa Italia Serie D, Coppa Italia Serie C, Coppa Italia, Cupa României)		Continental		Other		Total	
Club	Season	Division	Apps	Goals	Apps	Goals	Apps	Goals	Apps	Goals	Apps	Goals
Asti Calcio	2010–11	Serie D	36	1	0	0	—		1 (Note: Appearances in Serie D promotion play-offs)	0	37	1
Asti Calcio	2011–12	Serie D	29	4	0	0	—		—		29	4
Asti Calcio	Total		65	5	0	0	—		1	0	66	5
Real Vicenza	2012–13	Serie D	36	4	2	1	—		2	0	40	5
Delta Porto Tolle	2013–14	Lega Pro Seconda Divisione	13	2	0	0	—		3 (Note: Appearances in Lega Pro Seconda Divisione relegation play-outs)	0	16	2
Lumezzane	2014–15	Lega Pro	29	4	0	0	—		2 (Note: Appearances in Lega Pro relegation play-outs)	0	31	4
Reggiana	2015–16	Lega Pro	32	4	1	0	—		—		33	4
Reggiana	2016–17	Lega Pro	17	3	3 (Note: Two appearances in Coppa Italia, one appearance and one goal in Coppa Italia Lega Pro)	1	—		—		20	4
Reggiana	Total		49	7	4	1	—		0	0	53	8
Ascoli	2016–17	Serie B	7	0	—		—		—		7	0
Ascoli	2017–18	Serie B	39	1	2	0	—		2 (Note: Appearances in Serie B relegation play-outs)	0	43	1
Ascoli	Total		46	1	2	0	—		2	0	50	1
Cremonese	2018–19	Serie B	36	4	1	0	—		—		37	4
Cremonese	2019–20	Serie B	26	3	3	0	—		—		29	3
Cremonese	Total		62	7	4	0	—		0	0	66	7
Chievo Verona	2020–21	Serie B	35	3	1	0	—		1 (Note: Appearances in Serie B promotion play-offs)	1	37	4
Crotone	2021–22	Serie B	24	1	2	0	—		—		26	1
Crotone	2022–23	Serie C	17	3	1 (Note: Appearance in Coppa Italia Serie C)	0	—		2 (Note: Appearances in Serie C promotion play-offs)	0	19	3
Crotone	Total		41	4	3	0	—		2	0	46	4
CFR Cluj	2023–24	Liga I	34	0	4	0	2 (Note: Appearances in UEFA Conference League)	1	—		40	1
CFR Cluj	2024–25	Liga I	15	0	1	1	6	0	—		22	1
CFR Cluj	Total		49	0	5	1	8	1	—		62	2
Universitatea Craiova	2024–25	Liga I	11	1	0	0	—		—		11	1
Universitatea Craiova	2025–26	Liga I	14	0	2	0	7	0	—		23	0
Universitatea Craiova	Total		25	1	2	0	7	0	—		34	1
Bari	2026–27	Serie C	4	0	1	0	—		—		5	0
Career Total			454	38	24	3	15	1	21	2	506	43

=== International ===
As of 2 July 2024

Appearances and goals by national team and year
National team	Year	Apps	Goals
Romania
Romania	2019	1	0
Romania	2020	2	0
Romania	2021	1	0
Romania	2024	4	0
Total		8	0

== Honours ==
Universitatea Craiova

- Liga I: 2025–26
- Cupa României: 2025–26
