= Alejandro Rodríguez (footballer, born 1991) =

Spanish footballer

Personal information
- Full name: Alejandro Rodríguez de Miguel
- Date of birth: 30 July 1991 (age 35)
- Place of birth: Terrassa, Spain
- Height: 1.80 m (5 ft 11 in)
- Position: Forward

Youth career
- Espanyol

Senior career*
Years	Team	Apps	(Gls)
2010–2017	Cesena	81	(22)
2011–2012	→ Pavia (loan)	18	(2)
2015–2016	→ Sampdoria (loan)	6	(0)
2017–2021	Chievo	15	(1)
2017–2018	→ Salernitana (loan)	14	(4)
2018–2019	→ Empoli (loan)	6	(4)
2019	→ Brescia (loan)	6	(0)
2020–2021	→ Virtus Entella (loan)	19	(2)
2022	Lucchese	0	(0)
2022–2023	Mantova	9	(1)
- * Club domestic league appearances and goals as of 22 April 2023

Alejandro Rodríguez de Miguel (born 30 July 1991) is a Spanish professional footballer who plays as a forward.

== Career ==
=== Cesena and early career ===
Born in Terrassa, Barcelona, Catalonia, Rodríguez started his career at local club RCD Espanyol. In the summer of 2010 he joined Italian side Cesena, and made his first-team – and Serie A – debut on 7 November 2010, playing the last 13 minutes of a 1–3 loss at Juventus. He spent the vast majority of the season with the reserves, however.

In July 2011, Rodríguez moved to Pavia in a season-long loan deal. After playing regularly for the side he returned to Cesena, and netted his first goal for the club on 30 October 2012, scoring a last-minute 3–2 winner against Grosseto at Stadio Dino Manuzzi. In 2012–13 season, he was awarded the number 30 shirt which was vacated by Francesco Urso. In 2013, he picked the number 9 shirt which he inherited from Gianluca Lapadula when the latter departed the club.

On 31 August 2015 Rodríguez was signed by Serie A club U.C. Sampdoria on loan.

=== Chievo ===
On 29 June 2017, 1 day before the end of Cesena and Chievo's financial year, Rodríguez, Garritano, Rigione and Daniele Grieco of Cesnea was sold to Chievo, with Kupisz, Filippo Zambelli, Pietro Borgogna, Lorenzo Placidi and Carloalberto Tosi moved to Cesena on the same day. Additionally, Lamin Jallow moved to Cesena on a temporary deal, with an option to purchase at the end of 2017–18 season.

On 31 January 2019, he joined Brescia on loan.

On 31 January 2020, he joined Virtus Entella on loan until 30 June 2021.

=== Lucchese ===
On 4 March 2022, Rodríguez signed with Serie C club Lucchese until the end of the season.

=== Mantova ===
On 26 September 2022, Rodríguez moved to Mantova.
