= Guillaume Gigliotti =

French footballer (born 1989)

Personal information
- Full name: Guillaume René Gigliotti
- Date of birth: 9 November 1989 (age 37)
- Place of birth: Istres, France
- Height: 1.80 m (5 ft 11 in)
- Position: Left back

Team information
- Current team: Gelbison

Youth career
- Monaco

Senior career*
| Years | Team | Apps | (Gls) |
| 2007–2010 | Monaco II | 65 | (9) |
| 2010–2012 | Novara | 14 | (0) |
| 2011–2012 | → Foggia (loan) | 31 | (2) |
| 2012–2013 | Empoli | 1 | (0) |
| 2013–2014 | Badalona | 2 | (0) |
| 2014–2016 | Foggia | 64 | (6) |
| 2016–2018 | Ascoli | 61 | (3) |
| 2018–2019 | Salernitana | 25 | (0) |
| 2019–2020 | Crotone | 20 | (0) |
| 2020–2021 | Chievo | 23 | (2) |
| 2021–2023 | Bari | 24 | (0) |
| 2023–2024 | Crotone | 29 | (2) |
| 2024–2025 | Team Altamura | 11 | (0) |
| 2025– | Gelbison | 0 | (0) |
- * Club domestic league appearances and goals as of 31 January 2025

Guillaume René Gigliotti (born 9 November 1989) is a French footballer who plays as a left back for Italian Serie D club Gelbison.

== Career ==
Born in Istres, Gigliotti finished his formation with Monaco, making his senior debuts with the reserve team in the 2007–08 season. In July 2010, he moved to Italy, signing with Novara. After appearing sparingly with the club, he was loaned to Foggia in August 2011.

After being a regular with Foggia (contributing with 31 appearances and 2 goals), Gigliotti signed with Empoli, with Flavio Lazzari moved to opposite direction. However, he only appeared once with Empoli, playing the last minutes in a 3–1 home win over Varese.

On 3 September 2013 Gigliotti moved to Spain, signing a contract with Badalona on free transfer.

On 2 February 2014 he was signed by Foggia Calcio.

On 16 July 2018 he joined Serie B club Salernitana, signing a 3-year contract.

On 31 July 2019, he signed a 2-year contract with Serie B club Crotone.

On 5 October 2020 he moved to Chievo on a two-year contract.

On 19 January 2023, Gigliotti returned to Crotone and signed a contract until June 2024.

== Personal life ==
Guillaume's brother, David Gigliotti, is also a professional footballer. He is of Argentine descent through his father.

== Honours ==
Bari

- Serie C: 2021–22 (Group C)
