= Matteo Cotali =

Italian footballer

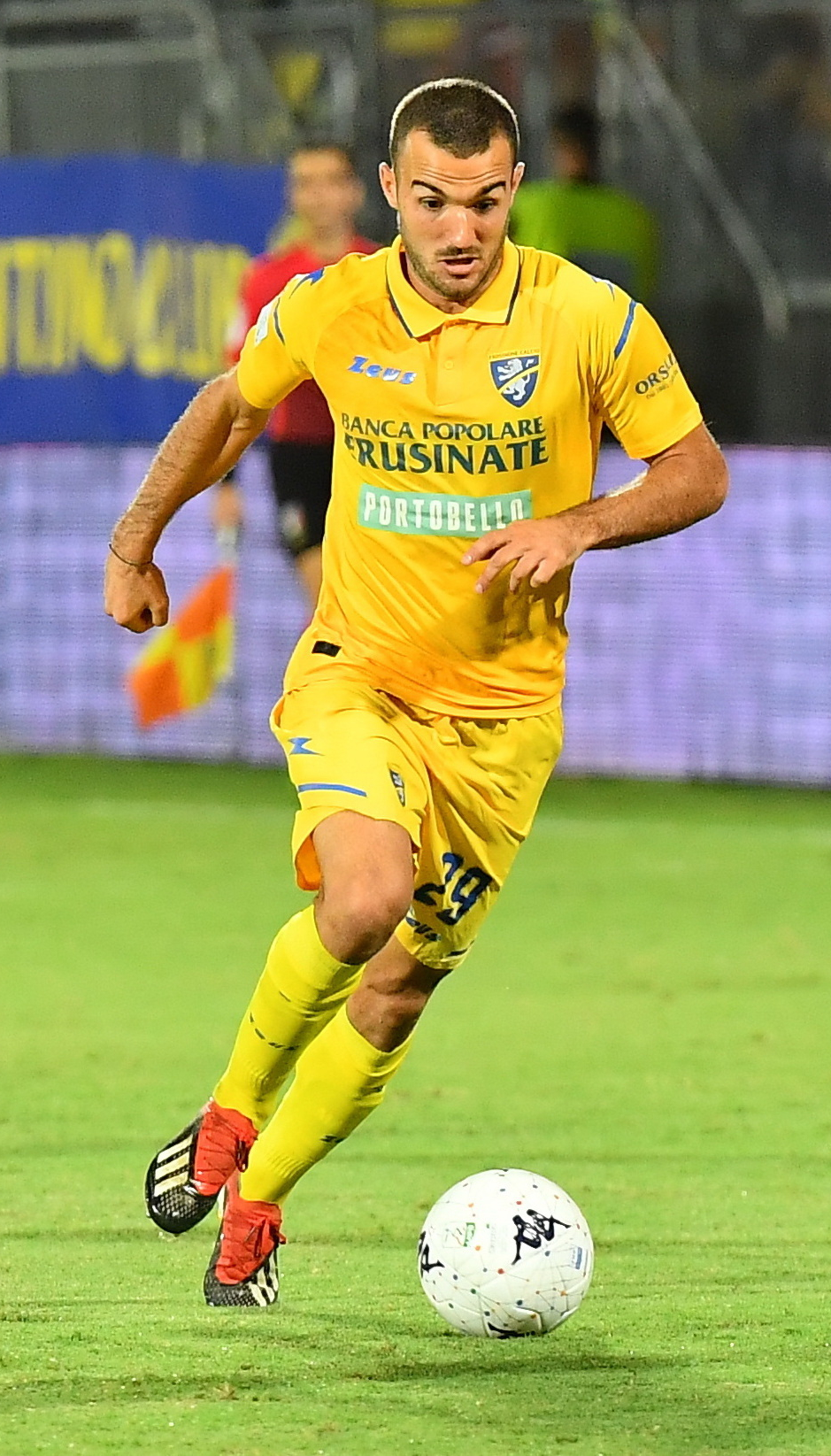

Personal information
- Date of birth: 22 April 1997 (age 29)
- Place of birth: Brescia, Italy
- Height: 1.77 m (5 ft 9 1/2 in)
- Position: Left-back

Youth career
- –2016: Cagliari
- 2016: → Inter (loan)

Senior career*
Years	Team	Apps	(Gls)
2016–2019	Cagliari	0	(0)
2016–2019	→ Olbia (loan)	110	(1)
2019–2021	Chievo	22	(0)
2021–2023	Frosinone	58	(0)
2023–2026	Modena	74	(1)
- * Club domestic league appearances and goals as of 10 May 2026

Matteo Cotali (born 22 April 1997) is an Italian professional footballer who plays as a left-back.

== Club career ==
He made his Serie C debut for Olbia on 27 August 2016 in a game against Renate.

On 3 July 2019, Cotali signed with Serie B club Chievo Verona.

On 6 August 2021, he joined Frosinone.
