= Yaw Asante =

Ghanaian professional footballer

Personal information
- Date of birth: 18 May 1991 (age 35)
- Place of birth: Accra, Ghana
- Height: 1.75 m (5 ft 9 in)
- Position: Midfielder

Team information
- Current team: Città Castello

Youth career
- –2011: Grosseto

Senior career*
Years	Team	Apps	(Gls)
2009–2015	Grosseto	40	(1)
2014	→ Cosenza (loan)	13	(0)
2015	Monza	9	(0)
2016	Gavorrano	11	(0)
2017–	Città Castello	2	(0)
- * Club domestic league appearances and goals as of 5 June 2013

Yaw Asante (born 18 May 1991) is a Ghanaian professional footballer who plays for Italian club Città Castello as a midfielder.

== Career ==
Asante signed for Grosseto before the start of 2009–10 Serie B season, and played for the youth team of Grosseto. Asante made his debut for Grosseto on 20 October 2010 in a 2010–11 Coppa Italia 2–1 defeat to Genoa at the Stadio Luigi Ferraris. He made his Serie B debut for Grosseto on 31 January 2012 in a match against Hellas Verona at the Stadio Marc'Antonio Bentegodi.

On 27 October 2012, he was taken out of the squad from Grosseto Calcio.

== Career statistics ==
As of 5 June 2013

Club performance			League		Cup		Continental		Total	
Season	Club	League	Apps	Goals	Apps	Goals	Apps	Goals	Apps	Goals
Italy			League		Coppa Italia		Europe		Total	
2009–10	Grosseto	Serie B	3	0	0	0	0	0	3	0
2010–11	Grosseto	Serie B	19	0	1	0	0	0	20	0
2011–12	Grosseto	Serie B	11	0	2	0	0	0	13	0
2012–13	Grosseto	Serie B	2	0	1	0	0	0	3	0
			League		Cup		Continental		Total	
Total	Italy		35	0	4	0	0	0	39	0
Career total			35	0	4	0	0	0	39	0
