= Riccardo Martinelli =

Italian footballer (born 1991)

Personal information
- Date of birth: 30 April 1991 (age 35)
- Place of birth: Arezzo, Italy
- Height: 1.87 m (6 ft 2 in)
- Position: Defender

Team information
- Current team: Piacenza

Youth career
- –2010: Cesena

Senior career*
Years	Team	Apps	(Gls)
2010–2014	Cesena	0	(0)
2010–2012	→ Bellaria IM (loan)	43	(0)
2013	→ Bellaria IM (loan)	13	(0)
2013–2014	→ Rimini (loan)	31	(3)
2014–2016	Rimini	45	(1)
2016–2018	Prato	58	(0)
2018–2019	Lucchese	32	(0)
2019–2021	Reggiana	32	(2)
2021–2022	Viterbese	26	(1)
2022–2025	Pontedera	81	(1)
2025–	Piacenza	0	(0)
- * Club domestic league appearances and goals as of 27 April 2025

Riccardo Martinelli (born 30 April 1991) is an Italian professional footballer who plays as a defender for Serie D club Piacenza.

== Club career ==
He played the first ten seasons of his senior career in the lower-tier Serie C and Serie D.

He made his Serie B debut for Reggiana on 27 September 2020 in a game against Pisa, as a starter, and scored a goal in that game.

On 30 August 2021 he signed with Viterbese.

On 31 August 2022, Martinelli moved to Pontedera.
