= Michael Fabbro =

Italian footballer

Personal information
- Date of birth: 10 May 1996 (age 30)
- Place of birth: San Daniele del Friuli, Italy
- Height: 1.73 m (5 ft 8 in)
- Position: Forward

Team information
- Current team: Cittadella

Youth career
- AC Milan

Senior career*
Years	Team	Apps	(Gls)
2015–2018	Bassano	89	(12)
2018–2021	Chievo	32	(2)
2018–2019	→ Siena (loan)	24	(2)
2019–2020	→ Pisa (loan)	20	(1)
2022	Siena	14	(1)
2022–2023	Virtus Verona	29	(3)
2023–2025	Taranto	39	(3)
2025–2026	Virtus Verona	30	(6)
2026–	Cittadella	0	(0)

International career^{‡}
2011–2012	Italy U-16	10	(6)
2012–2013	Italy U-17	5	(1)
2013–2014	Italy U-18	6	(0)
- * Club domestic league appearances and goals as of 30 April 2026 ‡ National team caps and goals as of 14 May 2014

Michael Fabbro (born 10 May 1996) is an Italian professional footballer who plays as a forward for Serie C Group A club Cittadella.

== Club career ==
He made his professional debut in the Lega Pro for Bassano Virtus on 6 September 2015 in a game against Cremonese.

In April 2018, Serie A club Chievo announced the signing of Fabbro, who would become a free agent on 1 July 2018.

On 2 September 2019 he was loaned to Pisa with an option to buy.

On 31 January 2022, Fabbro returned to Siena.

On 18 October 2022, Fabbro signed with Serie C club Virtus Verona until the end of the season.

On 7 September 2023, Fabbro joined Taranto on a one-season contract.

== International career ==
Fabbro represented Italy national under-17 football team at the 2013 FIFA U-17 World Cup.

== Career statistics ==
As of match played 3 April 2022

Club	Season	League	League		Cup		Europe		Other		Total	
Club	Season	League	Apps	Goals	Apps	Goals	Apps	Goals	Apps	Goals	Apps	Goals
Bassano Virtus	2015–16	Lega Pro	25	3	2	0	–		–		27	3
Bassano Virtus	2016–17	Lega Pro	35	6	3	0	–		–		38	6
Bassano Virtus	2017–18	Lega Pro	29	3	1	0	–		–		30	3
Bassano Virtus	Total		89	12	6	0	0	0	0	0	95	12
Chievo	2020–21	Serie B	32	2	1	0	–		–		33	2
Siena (loan)	2018–19	Serie C	27	3	0	0	–		–		27	3
Pisa (loan)	2019–20	Serie B	20	1	0	0	–		–		20	1
Siena	2021–22	Serie C	11	1	0	0	–		–		11	1
Career total			179	19	7	0	0	0	0	0	186	19
