= Luca Palmiero =

Italian footballer

Personal information
- Date of birth: 1 May 1996 (age 30)
- Place of birth: Mugnano di Napoli, Italy
- Height: 1.77 m (5 ft 10 in)
- Position: Midfielder

Team information
- Current team: Avellino
- Number: 6

Youth career
- Marano
- –2015: Napoli

Senior career*
Years	Team	Apps	(Gls)
2015–2022	Napoli	0	(0)
2015–2016	→ Paganese (loan)	14	(2)
2016–2017	→ Akragas (loan)	24	(0)
2017–2018	→ Cosenza (loan)	26	(1)
2018–2019	→ Cosenza (loan)	28	(1)
2019–2020	→ Pescara (loan)	21	(1)
2020–2021	→ Chievo (loan)	37	(1)
2021–2022	→ Cosenza (loan)	30	(0)
2022–2023	Pescara	29	(0)
2023–	Avellino	91	(0)

International career
2012	Italy U16	10	(0)
2012–2013	Italy U17	7	(0)
2013	Italy U18	1	(0)
- * Club domestic league appearances and goals as of 10 May 2026

Luca Palmiero (born 1 May 1996) is an Italian footballer who plays as a midfielder for Serie B club Avellino.

== Club career ==
=== Napoli ===
==== Loan to Paganese ====
On 20 August 2015, Palmiero was signed by Serie C side Paganese on a season-long loan deal. On 20 September e made his Serie C debut for Paganese as a substitute replacing Emanuele Cicirelli in the 93rd minute of a 2–1 home win over Fidelis Andria. On 5 December he played his first entire match for Paganese, a 2–1 away defeat against Matera. On 24 January 2016, Palmiero scored his first professional goal in the 42nd minute of a 3–1 home win over Martina Franca. On 23 March he scored his second goal, as a substitute, in the 93rd minute of a 2–0 away win over Ischia. Palmiero ended his season-long loan to Paganese with 14 appearances and 2 goals, all in Serie C.

==== Loan to Akragas ====
On 1 July 2016, Palmiero was loaned to Serie C side Akragas on a season-long loan deal. On 30 October he made his Serie C debut for Akragas as a substitute replacing German Cochis in the 63rd minute of a 3–1 away defeat against Matera. On 27 November, Palmiero played his first match as a starter for Akragas, a 2–0 away defeat against Paganese, he was replaced by Matteo Zanini in the 60th minute. On 3 December he played his first entire match for Akragas, a 1–0 away win over Casertana. On 30 April 2017 he received a red card in the 55th minute of a 3–1 home defeat against Juve Stabia. Palmiero ended his loan to Akragas with 25 appearances, 21 as a starter and 3 assists, all in Serie C.

==== Loan to Cosenza ====
On 18 July 2017, Palmiero, along with Gennaro Tutino and Luigi Liguori, were signed by Serie C side Cosenza on a season-long loan deal. On 30 July he made his debut for Cosenza, as a starter, in a 3–2 home defeat, after extra-time, against Alessandria in the first round of Coppa Italia, he was replaced by Massimo Loviso in the 63rd minute. On 9 September, Palmiero made his Serie C debut for Cosenza as a starter in a 0–0 away draw against Matera, he was replaced by Matteo Calamai in the 56th minute. On 3 December he played his first entire match for Cosenza, a 0–0 away draw against Rende. On 11 February 2018, Palmiero scored his first goal for Cosenza in the 26th minute of a 2–2 away draw against Catania. Palmiero ended his loan to Cosenza with 36 appearances, 1 goal and he helped Cosenza to reach the promotion in Serie B.

On 24 July 2018, Palmiero returned to Cosenza with a new season-long loan. On 4 August he started his second season with Cosenza in a 2–1 away win, after extra-time, over Trapani in the second round of Coppa Italia, he played the entire match. On 12 August he played in the third round in a 4–0 away defeat against Torino. On 27 August he made his Serie B debut as a substitute replacing Riccardo Maniero in the 60th minute of a 1–1 away draw against Ascoli. On 30 September he played his first entire match of the season, in Serie B, a 1–1 home draw against Perugia. On 5 May 2019, Palmiero scored his first goal of the season in the 90th minute of a 2–1 away win over Salernitana. Palmiero ended his second season on loan at Cosenza with 30 appearances, 1 goal and 1 assist.

==== Loan to Pescara ====
On 23 July 2019, Palmieri joined Serie B side Pescara on loan until 30 June 2020. On 11 August he made his debut for the club in a 3–2 home win against Mantova in the second round of Coppa Italia, he played the entire match. On 1 September he made his league debut and he scored his first goal for the club in the 94th minute of a 4–2 home win over Pordenone, he played the full match.

==== Loan to Chievo ====
On 25 September 2020, he joined Chievo on a season-long loan.

=== Return to Pescara ===
On 1 September 2022, Palmiero returned to Pescara on a permanent basis.

=== Avellino ===
On 14 July 2023, Palmiero signed a two-year contract with Avellino.

== International career ==
Palmiero represented Italy at Under-16, Under-17 and Under-18 level, and he collected a total of 18 caps. On 10 April 2012, Palmiero made his debut at U-16 level as a substitute, replacing Jose Mauri in the 51st minute of a 2–0 away win over Scotland U-16. On 19 December 2012, Palmieri made his debut at Under-17 level as a starter in a 1–0 away defeat against Greece U-17; he was replaced by Mario Pugliese in the 30th minute. On 21 February 2013, he played his first entire match for Italy U-17, a 3–3 away draw against Turkey U-17. On 14 August 2013, he made his first and only appearance for Italy U-18 as a substitute, replacing Gennaro Tutino in the 56th minute of a 2–1 home defeat against Austria U-18.

== Career statistics ==
=== Club ===
As of 15 May 2019

Club	Season	League			Cup		Europe		Other		Total	
Club	Season	League	Apps	Goals	Apps	Goals	Apps	Goals	Apps	Goals	Apps	Goals
Paganese (loan)	2015–16	Serie C	14	2	0	0	—		—		14	2
Akragas (loan)	2016–17	Serie C	24	0	0	0	—		1 (Note: All appearance(s) in Serie C play-out.)	0	25	0
Cosenza (loan)	2017–18	Serie C	26	1	1	0	—		9 (Note: All appearance(s) in Serie C play-off.)	0	36	0
Cosenza (loan)	2018–19	Serie B	28	1	2	0	—		—		30	1
Cosenza (loan)	Total Cosenza		63	2	3	0	—		10	0	66	2
Pescara (loan)	2019–20	Serie B	1	1	1	0	—		—		2	1
Career total			93	5	4	0	—		10	0	107	5
