= Tomasz Kupisz =

Polish footballer (born 1990)

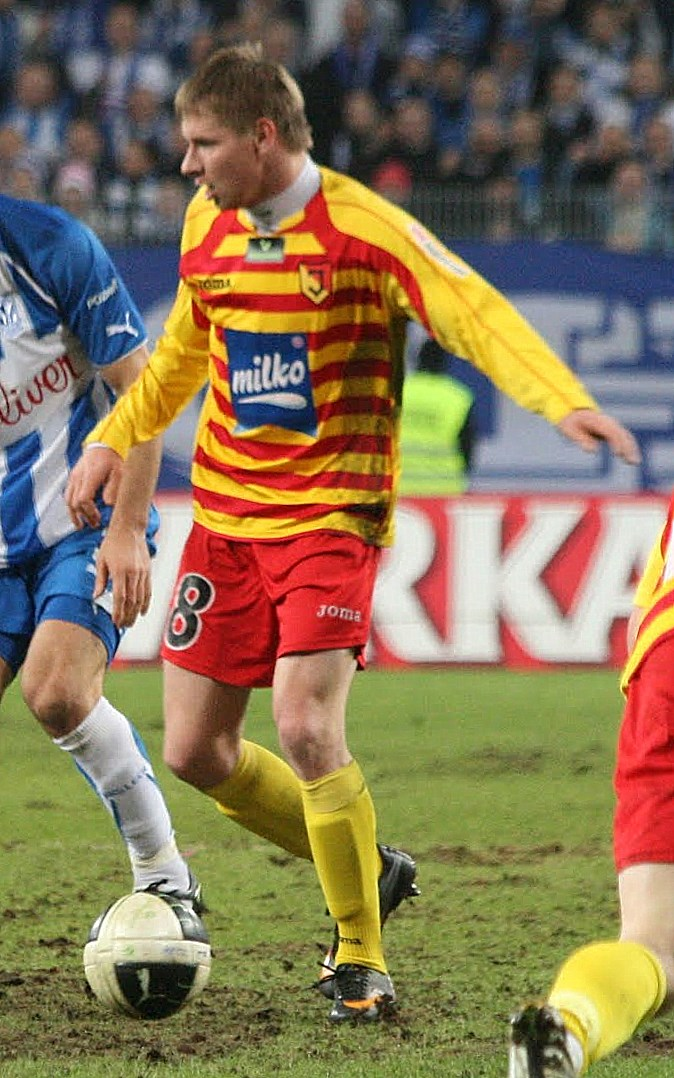
- Kupisz with Jagiellonia Białystok in 2011

Personal information
- Date of birth: 2 January 1990 (age 36)
- Place of birth: Radom, Poland
- Height: 1.80 m (5 ft 11 in)
- Position: Winger

Team information
- Current team: Hutnik Warsaw
- Number: 20

Youth career
- 2003–2004: Junior Radom
- 2004–2006: KS Piaseczno

Senior career*
Years	Team	Apps	(Gls)
2006–2010	Wigan Athletic	0	(0)
2006–2007	→ Oldham Athletic (loan)	3	(0)
2010–2013	Jagiellonia Białystok	95	(11)
2013–2017	Chievo	1	(0)
2014–2015	→ Cittadella (loan)	19	(4)
2015–2016	→ Brescia (loan)	40	(6)
2016–2017	→ Novara (loan)	27	(1)
2017–2018	Cesena	31	(4)
2018–2019	Ascoli	9	(0)
2019	→ Livorno (loan)	9	(0)
2019–2021	Bari	11	(0)
2020	→ Trapani (loan)	18	(1)
2020–2021	→ Salernitana (loan)	31	(3)
2021	Salernitana	0	(0)
2021–2022	Pordenone	9	(0)
2022	→ Reggina (loan)	16	(0)
2022–2024	Jagiellonia Białystok	38	(1)
2023–2024	Jagiellonia Białystok II	5	(1)
2024–	Hutnik Warsaw	48	(11)

International career
- Poland U17
	Poland U19	14	(4)
2010	Poland U20	2	(0)
2010–2012	Poland U21	10	(1)
2010–2013	Poland	4	(0)
- * Club domestic league appearances and goals as of 10:11, 15 June 2026 (UTC)

Tomasz Kupisz (Polish pronunciation: [ˈtɔmaʂ ˈkupiʂ]; born 2 January 1990) is a Polish professional footballer who plays as a winger for IV liga Masovia club Hutnik Warsaw.

== Club career ==
Kupisz joined Wigan Athletic in February 2007 after a successful trial. Previously he played for KS Piaseczno in Poland. He made his Latics debut on 26 August 2008 in a League Cup match against Notts County and scored the final goal in a 4–0 win. Despite the goal, he was not given playing time in any cup matches afterward. This was mainly due to a lengthy injury Tomasz picked up shortly after.

In the 2009–10 season, he finished as the third highest goalscorer in the reserve league, with six goals in thirteen matches, playing primarily on the wing. His goals included ones against Manchester United and Liverpool reserves. However, he did not get any opportunities in the first team and his contract with the club expired in June 2010.

On 2 June 2010, the Polish side Jagiellonia Białystok signed Kupisz, who was a free agent after the end of his contract with Wigan. On 29 July, he made his official debut for Jagiellonia in a Europa League qualifying match against Aris Thessaloniki F.C., his side losing 1–2.

On 5 July 2016, he joined Novara on loan from Chievo for the entire 2016–17 season.

On 29 June 2017, he became a Cesena player.

On 28 July 2018, he joined Serie B club Ascoli on a two-year contract. On 22 January 2019, he moved to Livorno on loan.

On 13 July 2019, he moved to Serie C newcomers Bari on a permanent basis. On 24 January 2020 he joined Serie B club Trapani on loan. On 15 September 2020, he moved on loan to Salernitana with an option to buy.

On 31 January 2022, Kupisz was loaned to Reggina with an option to buy.

On 2 September 2022, shortly after terminating his contract with Pordenone, he left Italy and returned to Jagiellonia on a two-year deal, with an extension option. He made 22 league appearances during Jagiellonia's title-winning 2023–24 season, and was released at its conclusion in June 2024.

On 17 September 2024, Kupisz joined fifth tier club Hutnik Warsaw.

== International career ==
Kupisz has represented Poland at under-19 and under-21 level. In December 2010, he made his senior international debut in a 2–2 draw against Bosnia and Herzegovina.

== Career statistics ==
=== Club ===
As of match played 12 June 2026

Appearances and goals by club, season and competition
Club	Season	League			National cup (Note: Includes Polish Cup, Coppa Italia)		Europe		Other		Total	
Club	Season	Division	Apps	Goals	Apps	Goals	Apps	Goals	Apps	Goals	Apps	Goals
Oldham Athletic (loan)	2006–07	EFL League One	3	0	0	0	—		0	0	3	0
Wigan Athletic	2008–09	Premier League	0	0	0	0	—		1 (Note: Appearance in Football League Cup)	1	1	1
Jagiellonia Białystok	2010–11	Ekstraklasa	30	5	4	0	2 (Note: Appearances in UEFA Europa League)	0	1 (Note: Appearance in Polish Super Cup)	0	37	5
Jagiellonia Białystok	2011–12	Ekstraklasa	29	5	1	1	2	0	—		32	6
Jagiellonia Białystok	2012–13	Ekstraklasa	30	1	4	3	—		—		34	4
Jagiellonia Białystok	2013–14	Ekstraklasa	6	0	1	0	—		—		7	0
Jagiellonia Białystok	Total		95	11	10	4	4	0	1	0	110	15
Chievo	2013–14	Serie A	1	0	0	0	—		—		1	0
Chievo	2014–15	Serie A	0	0	0	0	—		—		0	0
Chievo	Total		1	0	0	0	—		—		1	0
Cittadella (loan)	2014–15	Serie B	19	4	0	0	—		—		19	4
Brescia (loan)	2015–16	Serie B	40	6	2	0	—		—		42	6
Novara (loan)	2016–17	Serie B	27	1	1	0	—		—		28	1
Cesena	2017–18	Serie B	31	4	2	0	—		—		33	4
Ascoli	2018–19	Serie B	9	0	1	0	—		—		10	0
Livorno (loan)	2018–19	Serie B	9	0	—		—		—		9	0
Bari	2019–20	Serie C	11	0	0	0	—		2 (Note: Appearances in Coppa Italia Serie C)	1	13	1
Trapani (loan)	2019–20	Serie B	18	1	—		—		—		18	1
Salernitana (loan)	2020–21	Serie B	31	3	2	0	—		—		33	3
Pordenone	2021–22	Serie B	9	0	1	0	—		—		10	0
Reggina (loan)	2021–22	Serie B	16	0	—		—		—		16	0
Jagiellonia Białystok	2022–23	Ekstraklasa	16	1	0	0	—		—		16	1
Jagiellonia Białystok	2011–12	Ekstraklasa	22	0	5	0	—		—		27	0
Jagiellonia Białystok	Total		38	1	5	0	—		—		43	1
Jagiellonia II	2022–23	III liga, group I	1	0	—		—		—		1	0
Jagiellonia II	2023–24	III liga, gr. I	4	1	—		—		—		4	1
Jagiellonia II	Total		5	1	—		—		—		5	1
Hutnik Warsaw	2024–25	IV liga Masovia	24	7	—		—		—		24	7
Hutnik Warsaw	2025–26	IV liga Masovia	24	4	—		—		—		24	4
Hutnik Warsaw	Total		48	11	—		—		—		48	11
Career total			410	43	24	4	4	0	4	2	442	49

=== International ===
Appearances and goals by national team and year
National team	Year	Apps	Goals
Poland
Poland	2010	1	0
Poland	2011	1	0
Poland	2012	1	0
Poland	2013	1	0
Total		4	0

== Honours ==
Jagiellonia Białystok

- Ekstraklasa: 2023–24
- Polish Super Cup: 2010
