= Lamin Jallow =

Gambian footballer

Personal information
- Date of birth: 22 July 1994 (age 32)
- Place of birth: Banjul, The Gambia
- Height: 1.85 m (6 ft 1 in)
- Positions: Winger; forward

Team information
- Current team: Trapani
- Number: 95

Senior career*
| Years | Team | Apps | (Gls) |
| 2012–2014 | Real de Banjul | | |
| 2014–2019 | Chievo | 2 | (0) |
| 2015–2016 | → Cittadella (loan) | 27 | (6) |
| 2017 | → Trapani (loan) | 15 | (3) |
| 2017–2018 | → Cesena (loan) | 36 | (11) |
| 2018–2019 | → Salernitana (loan) | 35 | (6) |
| 2019–2020 | Salernitana | 22 | (6) |
| 2020–2022 | Vicenza | 22 | (3) |
| 2021 | → Fehérvár (loan) | 7 | (0) |
| 2022–2023 | Adanaspor | 17 | (4) |
| 2023 | Keçiörengücü | 4 | (0) |
| 2023–2024 | CR Belouizdad | 15 | (1) |
| 2024–2025 | Fidelis Andria | 18 | (4) |
| 2025 | Valmontone 1921 | 0 | (0) |
| 2025–2026 | Manfredonia | 25 | (5) |
| 2026– | Trapani | 0 | (0) |

International career
| 2016–2022 | Gambia | 20 | (1) |
- * Club domestic league appearances and goals as of 28 September 2026

Lamin Jallow (born 22 July 1994) is a Gambian professional footballer who plays as a winger for Serie D club Trapani.

== Club career ==
Born in Banjul, Jallow has played for Real de Banjul, Chievo Verona, Cittadella, Trapani and Salernitana.

On 31 January 2019, Salernitana bought out his rights from Chievo Verona, after he played for them on loan in the first half of the 2018–19 season, and he signed a four-and-a-half-year contract.

On 30 September 2020, he signed a three-year contract with Vicenza. On 12 August 2021, he joined Fehérvár in Hungary on loan with an option to buy.

On 11 August 2022, Jallow joined Adanaspor in Turkey on a two-year contract.

On 22 August 2023, he joined Algerian club CR Belouizdad.

On 3 August 2024, he joined Italian club Fidelis Andria 2018.

== International career ==
He made his international debut for Gambia in 2016. He played in the 2021 Africa Cup of Nations, his national team's first continental tournament, where they made the quarter-final.

== Personal life ==
In November 2020 he tested positive for COVID-19.

== Career statistics ==
As of 19 December 2021

| Club | Season | League | | | Cup | | Other | | Total | |
| Club | Season | Division | Apps | Goals | Apps | Goals | Apps | Goals | Apps | Goals |
|---|---|---|---|---|---|---|---|---|---|---|
| Chievo Verona | 2014–15 | Serie A | 0 | 0 | 0 | 0 | 0 | 0 | 0 | 0 |
| Chievo Verona | 2015–16 | Serie A | 0 | 0 | 0 | 0 | 0 | 0 | 0 | 0 |
| Chievo Verona | 2016–17 | Serie A | 2 | 0 | 1 | 0 | 0 | 0 | 3 | 0 |
| Chievo Verona | 2017–18 | Serie A | 0 | 0 | 0 | 0 | 0 | 0 | 0 | 0 |
| Chievo Verona | 2018–19 | Serie A | 0 | 0 | 0 | 0 | 0 | 0 | 0 | 0 |
| Chievo Verona | Total | | 2 | 0 | 1 | 0 | 0 | 0 | 3 | 0 |
| Cittadella (loan) | 2015–16 | Lega Pro | 27 | 6 | 2 | 1 | 0 | 0 | 29 | 7 |
| Trapani (loan) | 2016–17 | Serie B | 15 | 3 | 0 | 0 | 0 | 0 | 15 | 3 |
| Cesena (loan) | 2017–18 | Serie B | 36 | 11 | 2 | 1 | 0 | 0 | 38 | 12 |
| Salernitana (loan) | 2018–19 | Serie B | 35 | 6 | 0 | 0 | 0 | 0 | 35 | 6 |
| Salernitana (loan) | 2019–20 | Serie B | 22 | 6 | 2 | 0 | 0 | 0 | 24 | 6 |
| Salernitana (loan) | Total | | 57 | 12 | 2 | 0 | 0 | 0 | 59 | 12 |
| L.R. Vicenza | 2020–21 | Serie B | 22 | 3 | 1 | 0 | 0 | 0 | 23 | 3 |
| Fehérvár | 2021–22 | Nemzeti Bajnokság I | 7 | 0 | 1 | 2 | 0 | 0 | 8 | 2 |
| Career total | | | 166 | 35 | 9 | 4 | 0 | 0 | 175 | 39 |

=== International ===
As of match played 4 June 2022

Appearances and goals by national team and year
| National team | Year | Apps | Goals |
|---|---|---|---|
| Gambia | 2016 | 3 | 0 |
| Gambia | 2017 | 2 | 0 |
| Gambia | 2018 | 5 | 1 |
| Gambia | 2019 | 4 | 0 |
| Gambia | 2020 | – | |
| Gambia | 2021 | 3 | 0 |
| Gambia | 2022 | 2 | 0 |
| Total | | 19 | 1 |

Scores and results list the Gambia's goal tally first, score column indicates score after each Jallow goal.

List of international goals scored by Lamin Jallow
| No. | Date | Venue | Opponent | Score | Result | Competition |
|---|---|---|---|---|---|---|
| 1 | 17 November 2018 | Independence Stadium, Bakau, Gambia | Benin | 1–1 | 3–1 | 2019 Africa Cup of Nations qualification |
